= List of judges of the Supreme Court of the United Kingdom =

This is a list of justices of the Supreme Court of the United Kingdom since its creation on 1 October 2009 upon the transfer to the Supreme Court of the United Kingdom of the judicial functions of the House of Lords.

The court comprises a president, a deputy president and 10 (puisne) justices, for a total of 12 judges, of which – by convention – nine are from England and Wales, two from Scotland, and one from Northern Ireland. At the court's creation, 10 judges were appointed from the House of Lords, and one was appointed directly to it. The remaining initial vacancy was filled by Lord Dyson six months later.

== List of judges of the Supreme Court ==
Name		Start	End	Duration	Succeeded	Prior judicial office(s)	Notes
1	The Lord Phillips of Worth Matravers	1 October 2009	30 September 2012	3 years and 0 days	Original justice	Senior Lord of Appeal in Ordinary (2008–2009); Lord Chief Justice of England and Wales (2005–2008); Master of the Rolls (2000–2005); Lord of Appeal in Ordinary (1999–2000)	President (2009–2012)
2	The Lord Hope of Craighead	1 October 2009	26 June 2013	3 years and 269 days	Original justice	Second Senior Lord of Appeal in Ordinary (2009); Lord of Appeal in Ordinary (1996–2009); Lord President of the Court of Session (1989–1996)	Deputy President (2009–2013)
3	The Lord Saville of Newdigate	1 October 2009	30 September 2010	1 year and 0 days	Original justice	Lord of Appeal in Ordinary (1997–2009); Lord Justice of Appeal (1994–1997)	
4	The Lord Collins of Mapesbury	1 October 2009	7 May 2011	1 year and 219 days	Original justice	Lord of Appeal in Ordinary (2009); Lord Justice of Appeal (2007–2009)	
5	The Lord Rodger of Earlsferry	1 October 2009	26 June 2011	1 year and 269 days	Original justice	Lord of Appeal in Ordinary (2001–2009); Lord President of the Court of Session (1996–2001); Senator of the College of Justice (1995–1996)	Died in office
6	The Lord Brown of Eaton-under-Heywood	1 October 2009	9 April 2012	2 years and 192 days	Original justice	Lord of Appeal in Ordinary (2004–2009); Lord Justice of Appeal (1992–2004)	
7	The Lord Walker of Gestingthorpe	1 October 2009	17 March 2013	3 years and 174 days	Original justice	Lord of Appeal in Ordinary (2002–2009); Lord Justice of Appeal (1997–2002)	
8	The Lord Clarke of Stone-cum-Ebony	1 October 2009	30 September 2017	8 years and 0 days	Original justice	Master of the Rolls (2005–2009); Lord Justice of Appeal (1998–2005)	First justice directly appointed
9	The Lord Mance	1 October 2009	6 June 2018	8 years and 249 days	Original justice	Lord of Appeal in Ordinary (2005–2009); Lord Justice of Appeal (1999–2005)	Deputy President (2017–2018)
10	The Baroness Hale of Richmond	1 October 2009	31 January 2020	10 years and 102 days	Original justice	Lord of Appeal in Ordinary (2004–2009); Lord Justice of Appeal (1999–2003)	Deputy President (2013–2017); President (2017–2020)
11	The Lord Kerr of Tonaghmore	1 October 2009	30 September 2020	11 years and 0 days	Original justice	Lord of Appeal in Ordinary (2009); Lord Chief Justice of Northern Ireland (2004–2009)	Longest serving original justice
12	Lord Dyson	13 April 2010	1 October 2012	2 years and 172 days	Original justice	Deputy Head of Civil Justice (2003–2006); Lord Justice of Appeal (2001–2010)	First non-life peer appointed to the Court; First justice to stand down to take up another judicial office (Master of the Rolls)
13	Lord Wilson of Culworth	26 May 2011	9 May 2020	8 years and 350 days	The Lord Saville of Newdigate	Lord Justice of Appeal (2005–2011)	
14	Lord Sumption	11 January 2012	9 December 2018	6 years and 333 days	The Lord Collins of Mapesbury	None (Queen's Counsel (1986–2012))	First justice appointed with no prior full-time judicial experience
15	The Lord Reed of Allermuir	6 February 2012	Incumbent	14 years and 250 days	The Lord Rodger of Earlsferry	Senator of the College of Justice (1998–2012)	Deputy President (2018–2020); President (2020–present)
16	Lord Carnwath of Notting Hill	17 April 2012	15 March 2020	7 years and 334 days	The Lord Brown of Eaton-under-Heywood	Lord Justice of Appeal (2002–2012)	
17	The Lord Neuberger of Abbotsbury	1 October 2012	4 September 2017	4 years and 339 days	The Lord Phillips of Worth Matravers	Master of the Rolls (2009–2012); Lord of Appeal in Ordinary (2007–2009); Lord Justice of Appeal (2004–2007)	President (2012–2017)
18	Lord Hughes of Ombersley	9 April 2013	11 August 2018	5 years and 125 days	Lord Dyson	Vice President of the Criminal Division of the Court of Appeal (2009–2013); Lord Justice of Appeal (2006–2013)	
19	Lord Toulson	9 April 2013	22 September 2016	3 years and 167 days	The Lord Walker of Gestingthorpe	Lord Justice of Appeal (2006–2013); Chairman of the Law Commission (2002–2006)	
20	Lord Hodge	1 October 2013	31 December 2025	13 years and 13 days	The Lord Hope of Craighead	Senator of the College of Justice (2005–2013)	Deputy President (2020–2025)
21	Lady Black of Derwent	2 October 2017	10 January 2021	3 years and 101 days	Lord Toulson	Lord Justice of Appeal (2010–2017); Justice of the High Court, FD (1999–2010)	
22	Lord Lloyd-Jones	2 October 2017 (first term) 30 August 2022 (second term)	13 January 2022 (first term); Incumbent (second term)	4 years and 104 days (first term); 4 years and 45 days (second term)	The Lord Clarke of Stone-cum-Ebony; Himself	Lord Justice of Appeal (2012–2017); Justice of the High Court, QBD (2005–2012)	Last Justice to be required to retire at 70 before the judicial retirement age was raised to 75 by the Public Service Pensions and Judicial Offices Act 2022; First Justice to be re-appointed (30 August 2022)
23	Lord Briggs of Westbourne	2 October 2017	Incumbent	9 years and 12 days	The Lord Neuberger of Abbotsbury	Lord Justice of Appeal (2013–2017); Justice of the High Court, CD (2006–2013)	
24	Lady Arden of Heswall	1 October 2018	24 January 2022	3 years and 116 days	The Lord Mance	Lady Justice of Appeal (2000–2018); Justice of the High Court, CD (1993–2000)	
25	Lord Kitchin	1 October 2018	29 September 2023	4 years and 364 days	Lord Hughes of Ombersley	Lord Justice of Appeal (2011–2018); Justice of the High Court, CD (2005–2011)	
26	Lord Sales	11 January 2019	Incumbent	7 years and 276 days	Lord Sumption	Lord Justice of Appeal (2014–2019); Justice of the High Court, CD (2008–2014)	Deputy President (2026–present)
27	Lord Hamblen of Kersey	13 January 2020	Incumbent	6 years and 274 days	The Baroness Hale of Richmond	Lord Justice of Appeal (2016–2020); Justice of the High Court, QBD (2008–2016)	
28	Lord Leggatt	21 April 2020	Incumbent	6 years and 176 days	Lord Carnwath of Notting Hill	Lord Justice of Appeal (2018–2020); Justice of the High Court, QBD (2012–2018)	
29	Lord Burrows	2 June 2020	Incumbent	6 years and 134 days	Lord Wilson of Culworth	None (Queen's Counsel (2003–2020))	Appointed with no prior full-time judicial experience; First to be directly appointed from academia
30	Lord Stephens of Creevyloughgare	1 October 2020	Incumbent	6 years and 13 days	The Lord Kerr of Tonaghmore	Lord Justice of Appeal (NI) (2017–2020); Justice of the High Court (NI) (2007–2017)	
31	Lady Rose of Colmworth	13 April 2021	Incumbent	5 years and 184 days	Lady Black of Derwent	Lady Justice of Appeal (2019–2021); Justice of the High Court, CD (2013–2019)	
32	Lord Richards of Camberwell	3 October 2022	9 June 2026	3 years and 250 days	Lady Arden of Heswall	Lord Justice of Appeal (2015–2021); Justice of the High Court, CD (2003–2015)	
33	Lady Simler	14 November 2023	Incumbent	2 years and 334 days	Lord Kitchin	Lady Justice of Appeal (2019–2023); Justice of the High Court, QBD (2013–2019)	
34	Lord Doherty	12 January 2026	Incumbent	275 days	Lord Hodge	Senator of the College of Justice (2010–2026)	
35	Lord Snowden of Redcar	15 June 2026	Incumbent	121 days	Lord Richards of Camberwell	Lord Justice of Appeal (2021–2026); Justice of the High Court, CD (2015–2021)	

== See also ==
- List of Lords of Appeal in Ordinary
- Supreme Court of the United Kingdom
- Constitutional Reform Act 2005
- Courts of the United Kingdom
