= Judiciaries of the United Kingdom =

Courts of law

The judiciaries of the United Kingdom are the separate judiciaries of the three legal systems in England and Wales, Northern Ireland and Scotland. The judges of the Supreme Court of the United Kingdom, the Special Immigration Appeals Commission, Employment Tribunals, Employment Appeal Tribunal and the UK tribunals system do have a United Kingdom-wide jurisdiction but judgments only apply directly to the jurisdiction from which a case originates as the same case points and principles do not inevitably apply in the other jurisdictions. In employment law, employment tribunals and the Employment Appeal Tribunal have jurisdiction in the whole of Great Britain (i.e., not in Northern Ireland).

There have been multiple calls from both Welsh academics and politicians however for a Welsh justice system.

== Justices of the Supreme Court ==
The judges of the Supreme Court of the United Kingdom are known as Justices of the Supreme Court, and they are also Privy Counsellors. Justices of the Supreme Court are granted the courtesy title Lord or Lady for life.

The Supreme Court is a relatively new Court being established in October 2009 following the Constitutional Reform Act 2005. Formerly, the Highest Court of Appeal in the United Kingdom was the House of Lords Appellate Committee made up of Lords of Appeal in Ordinary, also known as Law Lords, which with other Lord Justices now form the Supreme Court. It also took over devolution cases from the Judicial Committee of the Privy Council. Such Law Lords were allowed to sit in the House of Lords and were members for life.

The Supreme Court serves as the highest court of appeal for all cases in England and Wales and in Northern Ireland, but only for civil cases in Scotland. The High Court of Justiciary remains the court of last resort in Scotland for criminal cases.

The Supreme Court is headed by the President and Deputy President of the Supreme Court and is composed of ten Justices of the Supreme Court.

The Justices do not wear any gowns or wigs in court, but on ceremonial occasions they wear black damask gowns with gold lace without a wig.

== Tribunal Judiciary ==
The UK tribunal system is part of the national system of administrative justice with tribunals classed as non-departmental public bodies (NDPBs). Though it has grown up on an ad hoc basis since the beginning of the twentieth century, from 2007 reforms were put in place to build a unified system with recognised judicial authority, routes of appeal and regulatory supervision, and recognised legally qualified members of tribunals as members of the judiciary who are guaranteed continued judicial independence. The UK tribunal system is headed by the Senior President of Tribunals.

== See also ==
- List of judges of the Supreme Court of the United Kingdom
- Courts of England and Wales / Judiciary of England and Wales
- Courts of Scotland / Judiciary of Scotland
- Courts of Northern Ireland / Judiciary of Northern Ireland
- Law of the United Kingdom
- Election court
- English law
- Scots law
- Northern Ireland law
- Welsh law
