= Supreme Court of the United Kingdom =

Final court of appeal in the UK

- Badge
- Interactive map of Supreme Court of the United Kingdom
- 51°30′01″N 0°07′41″W
- Established: 1 October 2009
- Jurisdiction: United Kingdom
- Location: Middlesex Guildhall, Parliament Square, London, England
- Coordinates: 51°30′01″N 0°07′41″W
- Composition method: Appointed by the Monarch on the advice of the Prime Minister, following approval of a recommendation by the Lord Chancellor based on recommendation from an independent selection commission
- Authorised by: Constitutional Reform Act 2005
- Appeals from: England and Wales Court of Appeal; Scotland Inner House of the Court of Session; High Court of Justiciary (matters relating to human rights compatibility and devolution issues only); Northern Ireland Court of Appeal (Northern Ireland); UK–wide Court Martial Appeal Court
- Judge term length: Mandatory retirement at age 75
- Number of positions: 12
- Website: supremecourt.uk

President
- Currently: The Lord Reed of Allermuir
- Since: 13 January 2020
- Jurist term ends: 7 September 2031

Deputy President
- Currently: Lord Sales
- Since: 12 January 2026

The Supreme Court of the United Kingdom (initialism: UKSC) is the final court of appeal for all civil cases in the United Kingdom and all criminal cases originating in England, Wales and Northern Ireland, as well as some limited criminal cases from Scotland. (Note: Matters relating to devolution, reserved matters and human rights only)

Established on 1 October 2009, per the Constitutional Reform Act 2005, Part 3, Section 23(1), the Court is the United Kingdom's highest appellate court for these matters, and it hears cases of the greatest public or constitutional importance affecting the whole population. Additionally the Supreme Court hears cases on devolution matters from Scotland, Wales and Northern Ireland. As a consequence, the court must include judges from the three distinct legal systems of the United Kingdom – England and Wales, Scotland and Northern Ireland.

The Court usually sits in the Middlesex Guildhall in Westminster, though it can sit elsewhere and has, for example, sat in the Edinburgh City Chambers, the Royal Courts of Justice in Belfast, the Tŷ Hywel Building in Cardiff and the Manchester Civil Justice Centre.

The United Kingdom has a doctrine of parliamentary sovereignty and no entrenched codified constitution, so the Supreme Court is much more limited in its powers of judicial review than the constitutional or supreme courts of some other countries such as India, the United States of America, Canada and Australia. It cannot overturn any primary legislation made by Parliament. However, as with some other courts in the UK, it can overturn secondary legislation if, for example, that legislation is found to be ultra vires to the powers in primary legislation allowing it to be made.

Further, under section 4 of the Human Rights Act 1998, the Supreme Court, like some other courts in the United Kingdom, may make a declaration of incompatibility, indicating that it believes that the legislation subject to the declaration is incompatible with one of the rights in the European Convention on Human Rights. Such a declaration can apply to primary or secondary legislation. The declaration does not overturn the legislation, and neither Parliament nor the government is required to agree with any such declaration. However, if they accept a declaration, ministers can exercise powers under section 10 of the Human Rights Act to amend the legislation by statutory instrument to remove the incompatibility or ask Parliament to amend the legislation.

The Supreme Court of the United Kingdom is a non-ministerial government department of the Government of the United Kingdom. Section 23 of the Constitutional Reform Act limits the number of judges on the Court to 12, though it also allows for this rule to be amended, to further increase the number of judges, if a resolution is passed in both Houses of Parliament. Most cases are decided by a panel of five of the judges (justices); in particularly important cases, the court may use a panel of eleven justices.

The Supreme Court assumed the judicial functions of the House of Lords, which had been exercised by the Lords of Appeal in Ordinary (commonly called "Law Lords"), the 12 judges appointed as members of the House of Lords to carry out its judicial business as the Appellate Committee of the House of Lords. Its jurisdiction over devolution matters had previously been exercised by the Judicial Committee of the Privy Council.

== History ==
=== Creation ===
The creation of a Supreme Court for the United Kingdom was first proposed in a consultation paper published by the Department of Constitutional Affairs in July 2003. Although the paper noted that there had been no criticism of the then-current Law Lords or any indication of an actual bias, it argued that the separation of the judicial functions of the Appellate Committee of the House of Lords from the legislative functions of the House of Lords should be made explicit. The paper noted the following concerns:

1. Whether there was any longer sufficient transparency of independence from the executive and the legislature to give assurance of the independence of the judiciary.
2. The requirement for the appearance of impartiality and independence limited the ability of the Law Lords to contribute to the work of the House itself, thus reducing the value to both them and the House of their membership.
3. It was not always understood by the public that judicial decisions of "the House of Lords" were taken by the Appellate Committee and that non-judicial members were never involved in the judgments. Conversely, it was felt that the extent to which the Law Lords themselves had decided to refrain from getting involved in political issues concerning legislation on which they might later have had to adjudicate was not always appreciated. The first President of the Court, The Lord Phillips of Worth Matravers, claimed that the old system confused people and that the Supreme Court would for the first time be a clear separation of powers among the judiciary, the legislature and the executive.
4. Space within the House of Lords was at a constant premium and a separate supreme court would ease the pressure on the Palace of Westminster.

The main argument against a new Supreme Court was that the previous system had worked well and kept costs down. Reformers expressed concern that this second main example of a mixture of the legislative, judicial and executive might conflict with professed values under the Universal Declaration of Human Rights. Officials who make or execute laws have an interest in court cases that put those laws to the test. When the state invests judicial authority in those officials or even their day-to-day colleagues, it puts the independence and impartiality of the courts at risk. Consequently, it was hypothesised that closely connected decisions of the Law Lords to debates had by friends or on which the Lord Chancellor had expressed a view might be challenged on human-rights grounds on the basis that they had not constituted a fair trial.

The Lord Neuberger of Abbotsbury, later President of the Supreme Court, expressed fear that the new court could make itself more powerful than the House of Lords committee it succeeded, saying that there is a real risk of "judges arrogating to themselves greater power than they have at the moment". The Lord Phillips of Worth Matravers said such an outcome was "a possibility", but was "unlikely".

The reforms were controversial and were brought forward with little consultation but were subsequently extensively debated in Parliament. During 2004, a select committee of the House of Lords scrutinised the arguments for and against setting up a new court. The Government estimated the set-up cost of the Supreme Court at £56.9 million.

=== Significant cases ===
The first case heard by the Supreme Court was HM Treasury v Ahmed, which concerned "the separation of powers", according to Phillips, its inaugural President. At issue was the extent to which Parliament has, by the United Nations Act 1946, delegated to the executive the power to legislate. Resolution of this issue depended upon the approach properly to be adopted by the court in interpreting legislation which may affect fundamental rights at common law or under the European Convention on Human Rights.

One of the most important cases presented to the Supreme Court was the joint cases of R (Miller) v The Prime Minister and Cherry v Advocate General for Scotland, known as Miller/Cherry, on Boris Johnson's unlawful prorogation (suspension) of Parliament, to suppress debate in anticipation of Britain's withdrawal from the European Union, "frustrating or preventing the constitutional role of Parliament in holding the Government to account". It is one of only two cases that involved the presence of 11 judges (the highest number of judges currently allowed to rule on a case). The case carried a large amount of political tension in the context of the process of the United Kingdom leaving the European Union; for some, the ruling "delighted 'Remainers' but appalled 'Leavers'", although some Conservative MPs who sought to withdraw from the EU with an agreement had opposed the prorogation.

In 2022, the Supreme Court ruled on whether the Scottish Parliament had the power to legislate for a second independence referendum. In the case, the five-judge panel unanimously found that Scotland did not have the right to organise a referendum without the permission of Westminster, as questions around independence qualify as "reserved matters" (reserved to the central government) under the Scotland Act 1998. Nicola Sturgeon, the then-leader of the pro-independence Scottish National Party, regarded the decision as "a hard pill for any supporter of independence... to swallow" but reiterated the party's commitment to "find another democratic, lawful means for Scottish people to express their will".

In 2025, the Supreme Court ruled on the meaning on the word 'woman' for the purposes of the Equality Act 2010. The court concluded unanimously that, the word means 'biological woman' and thus that trans women are not women for the purposes of British equality law. Accordingly, where single sex spaces have been provided for men and women respectively (such as toilets, changing rooms and sporting teams for example), trans women thus have no inherent right to access the women's space.

== Jurisdiction and powers ==
From the Supreme Court –

The Supreme Court is the final court of appeal in the UK for civil cases, and for criminal cases from England, Wales and Northern Ireland. It hears cases of the greatest public or constitutional importance affecting the whole population.

The Supreme Court hears appeals (i) in England and Wales, from the Court of Appeal (Civil Division), the Court of Appeal (Criminal Division) and (ii) in Scotland from the Court of Session.

The Supreme Court is the highest court of appeal in relation to Scottish civil cases. However, the High Court of Justiciary is the highest court of appeal in relation to Scottish criminal cases.

The Supreme Court also determines devolution issues (as defined by the Scotland Act 1998, the Northern Ireland Act 1998 and the Government of Wales Act 2006). These are legal proceedings about the powers of the three devolved administrations—the Northern Ireland Executive and Northern Ireland Assembly, the Scottish Government and the Scottish Parliament, the Welsh Government and Senedd. Devolution issues were previously heard by the Judicial Committee of the Privy Council and most are about compliance with rights under the European Convention on Human Rights, brought into national law by the Devolution Acts and the Human Rights Act 1998.

On rare occasions the court may have original jurisdiction, normally in cases relating to contempt of the Supreme Court, such as Proceedings for Contempt: Mr Tim Crosland and its appeal case HM Attorney General v Crosland.

== Panels and sittings ==
The twelve justices do not all hear every case. Unless there are circumstances requiring a larger panel, a case is usually heard by a panel of five justices. More than five justices may sit on a panel where the case is of "high constitutional importance" or "great public importance"; if the case raises "an important point in relation to the European Convention on Human Rights"; if the case involves a conflict of decisions among the House of Lords, Judicial Committee of the Privy Council, or Supreme Court; or if the Court "is being asked to depart, or may decide to depart from" its (or the House of Lords') previous precedent. The composition of panels is ultimately determined by the President.

To avoid a tie, all cases are heard by a panel containing an odd number of justices. Thus, the largest possible panel for a case is 11 justices. To date, there have been only two cases (both involving matters of major constitutional importance) heard by 11 justices: the case of R (Miller) v Secretary of State for Exiting the European Union (argued in 2016 and decided in 2017) and the cases of R (Miller) v The Prime Minister and Cherry v Advocate General for Scotland (argued and decided in 2019).

Although they may wear black damask robes with gold embellishments including the supreme court badge for portraits or ceremonial occasions, the justices have never worn court dress during sittings. In November 2011, The Lord Phillips of Worth Matravers allowed counsel to jointly agree to "dispense with any or all of the traditional elements of court dress" at sittings.

== Administration ==
The Supreme Court has a separate administration from the other courts of England and Wales, Scotland and Northern Ireland, under a Chief Executive who is appointed by the Court's president.

== Judges ==
The court is composed of the President and Deputy President and ten other Justices of the Supreme Court, all with the style of Justice of the Supreme Court under section 23(6) of the Constitutional Reform Act. The President and Deputy President of the court are separately appointed to those roles. The Supreme Court of the United Kingdom is required to have judges who have previously served in the legal systems of England and Wales, Scotland and Northern Ireland, and act as representatives of their respective legal systems in the Supreme Court. The selection commission which selects the judges who sit in the Supreme Court is required to ensure that the court will have knowledge of, and experience of practice in, the legal system of each country of the United Kingdom. As a result of devolution in 1998, in Scotland for instance, the Judicial Appointments Board for Scotland is consulted on each appointment to the Supreme Court, as is the first minister of Scotland, regardless as to whether the judge being nominated is Scottish or not.

The ten Lords of Appeal in Ordinary (Law Lords) holding office on 1 October 2009 became the first judges of the twelve-member Supreme Court. The eleventh place on the Supreme Court was filled by The Lord Clarke of Stone-cum-Ebony (formerly the Master of the Rolls), who was the first justice to be appointed directly to the Supreme Court. One of the former Law Lords, The Lord Neuberger of Abbotsbury, was appointed to replace Clarke as Master of the Rolls, and so did not move to the new court. Lord Dyson became the twelfth and final judge of the Supreme Court on 13 April 2010. In 2010, Queen Elizabeth II granted justices who are not peers use of the title Lord or Lady, by warrant under the royal sign-manual.

The Senior Law Lord on 1 October 2009, The Lord Phillips of Worth Matravers, became the Supreme Court's first President, and the Second Senior Law Lord, The Lord Hope of Craighead, became the first Deputy President.

On 30 September 2010 The Lord Saville of Newdigate became the first justice to retire, followed by The Lord Collins of Mapesbury on 7 May 2011, although the latter remained as an acting judge until the end of July 2011.

In June 2011 The Lord Rodger of Earlsferry became the first justice to die in office, after a short illness.

=== Acting judges ===
In addition to the twelve permanent judges, the President may request other senior judges drawn from two groups to sit as "acting judges" of the Supreme Court.

- The first group are those judges who currently hold 'office as a senior territorial judge': judges of the Court of Appeal of England and Wales, judges of the Court of Appeal of Northern Ireland and judges of the First or Second Division of the Inner House of the Court of Session in Scotland. This has included the former Lord President, Lord Carloway sitting on cases.
- The second group are known as the 'supplementary panel'. The President may approve in writing retired judges' membership of this panel if they are under 75 and are (a) former supreme court justices or (b) former 'senior territorial judges'. A list of those currently appointed is to be found on the Supreme Court website. (The system is similar to senior status in the United States Federal Courts of Appeal, although there are important differences: for example, a judge on the supplementary panel does not receive a salary).

=== Qualification for appointment ===
Section 25 of the Constitutional Reform Act 2005 details the requirements for a person to be eligible for appointment to the Court. A person is qualified for appointment if they have, at any time:

- held high judicial office for at least 2 years or
- been a qualified practitioner for at least 15 years.

To hold high judicial office includes; being a High Court Judge of England and Wales, or of Northern Ireland; a Court of Appeal Judge of England and Wales, or Northern Ireland; or a Judge on the Court of Sessions. A person is a qualified practitioner if they are an advocate in Scotland or a solicitor entitled to appear in the Court of Session and the High Court of Justiciary; or a member of the Bar of Northern Ireland or a solicitor of the Court of Judicature of Northern Ireland.

=== Appointment process ===
The Constitutional Reform Act 2005 makes provision for a new appointment process for Justices of the Supreme Court. An independent selection commission is to be formed when vacancies arise. This is to be composed of the President of the Supreme Court (the chair), another senior UK judge (not a Supreme Court Justice) and a member of the Judicial Appointments Commission of England and Wales, the Judicial Appointments Board for Scotland and the Northern Ireland Judicial Appointments Commission. By law, at least one of these must be a non-lawyer. However, there is a similar but separate commission to appoint the next President of the Supreme Court, which is chaired by one of the non-lawyer members and features another Supreme Court Justice in the place of the President. Both of these commissions are convened by the Lord Chancellor. In October 2007, the Ministry of Justice announced that the appointment process would be adopted voluntarily for appointments of Lords of Appeal in Ordinary.

The commission selects one person for the vacancy and notifies the Lord Chancellor of its choice. The Lord Chancellor then either

- approves the commission's selection
- rejects the commission's selection, or
- asks the commission to reconsider its selection.

If the Lord Chancellor approves the person selected by the commission, the Prime Minister must then recommend that person to the Monarch for appointment.

New judges appointed to the Supreme Court after its creation do not necessarily receive peerages. Following a Royal Warrant dated 10 December 2010, all Justices of the Supreme Court of the United Kingdom not holding a peerage are entitled to the judicial courtesy title of Lord or Lady and retain this style for life.

The President and Deputy President of the Supreme Court are appointed to those roles rather than being the most senior by tenure in office.

=== List of current judges ===
The most recent to join the court is Lord Snowden of Redcar, who joined on 15 June 2026 in place of Lord Richards of Camberwell. In order of seniority, they are as follows:

Name	Born	Higher education	Invested	Mandatory retirement	Prior senior judicial roles
The Lord Reed of Allermuir (President)	7 September 1956 (age 70)	University of Edinburgh School of Law; Balliol College, Oxford	6 February 2012	7 September 2031	Senator of the College of Justice: Inner House (2008–2012); Outer House (1998–2008)
Lord Sales (Deputy President)	11 February 1962 (age 64)	Churchill College, Cambridge; Worcester College, Oxford	11 January 2019	11 February 2037	Lord Justice of Appeal (2014–2018); Justice of the High Court, CD (2008–2014)
Lord Lloyd-Jones	13 January 1952 (age 74)	Downing College, Cambridge	2 October 2017	13 January 2027	Lord Justice of Appeal (2012–2017); Justice of the High Court, QBD (2005–2012)
Lord Briggs of Westbourne	23 December 1954 (age 71)	Magdalen College, Oxford	2 October 2017	23 December 2029	Lord Justice of Appeal (2013–2017); Justice of the High Court, CD (2006–2013)
Lord Hamblen of Kersey	23 September 1957 (age 69)	St John's College, Oxford; Harvard Law School	13 January 2020	23 September 2032	Lord Justice of Appeal (2016–2020); Justice of the High Court, QBD (2008–2016)
Lord Leggatt	12 November 1957 (age 69)	King's College, Cambridge; Harvard University; City Law School	21 April 2020	12 November 2032	Lord Justice of Appeal (2018–2020); Justice of the High Court, QBD (2012–2018)
Lord Burrows	17 April 1957 (age 69)	Brasenose College, Oxford; Harvard Law School	2 June 2020	17 April 2032	None: first Justice to be appointed directly from academia
Lord Stephens of Creevyloughgare	28 December 1954 (age 71)	University of Manchester	1 October 2020	28 December 2029	Lord Justice of Appeal (NI) (2017–2020); Justice of the High Court (NI) (2007–2017)
Lady Rose of Colmworth	13 April 1960 (age 66)	Newnham College, Cambridge; Brasenose College, Oxford	13 April 2021	13 April 2035	Lady Justice of Appeal (2019–2021); Justice of the High Court, CD (2013–2019)
Lady Simler	17 September 1963 (age 63)	Sidney Sussex College, Cambridge; University of Amsterdam	14 September 2023	17 September 2038	Lady Justice of Appeal (2019–2023); Justice of the High Court, QBD (2013–2019)
Lord Doherty	30 January 1958 (age 68)	University of Edinburgh School of Law; Hertford College, Oxford; Harvard University	12 January 2026	30 January 2033	Senator of the College of Justice: Inner House (2020–2026); Outer House (2010–2020)
Lord Snowden of Redcar	22 March 1962 (age 64)	Downing College, Cambridge; Harvard Law School	15 June 2026	22 March 2037	Lord Justice of Appeal (2021–2026); Justice of the High Court, CD (2015–2021)

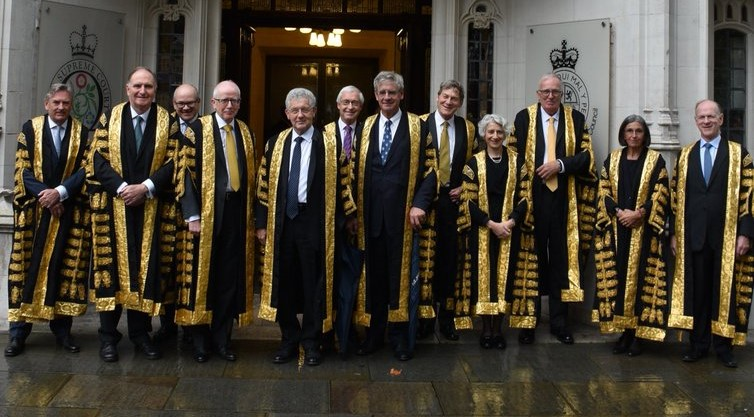
2024 group portrait of the Justices of the United Kingdom Supreme Court enrobed

== Overseas work ==
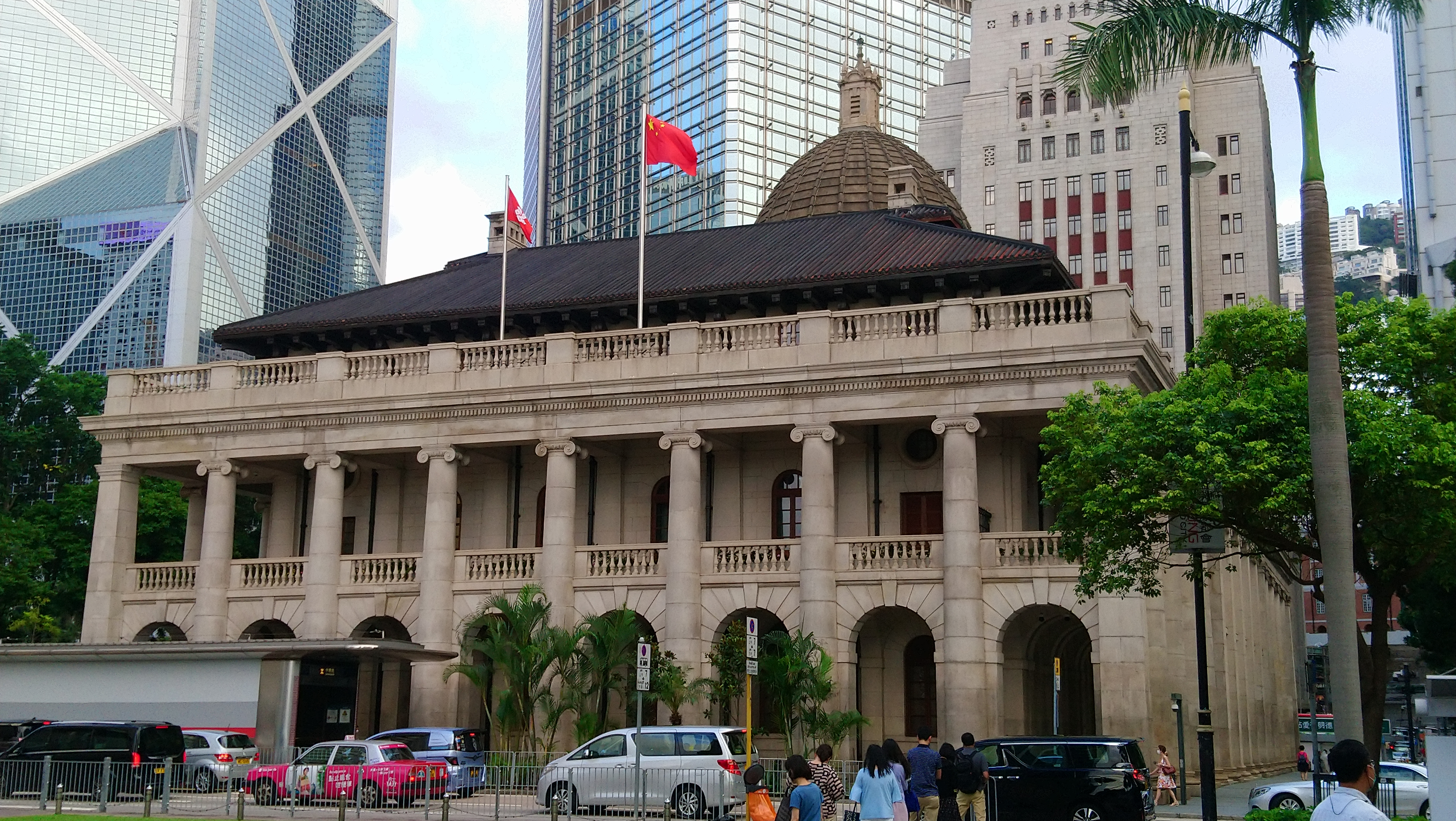
Hong Kong Court of Final Appeal

The UK Supreme Court has, since its inception, sent some of its justices to sit on Hong Kong's highest court, the Court of Final Appeal. This practice was established when the Court of Final Appeal was first set up in 1997 and before the founding of the UK Supreme Court, when the House of Lords was still the final appellate court in the UK. When British justices sit on Hong Kong's Court of Final Appeal, they are required by law to take the judicial oath with the pledge of allegiance to the Hong Kong SAR of the People's Republic of China. Due to this, they are not "overseas judges". They become local Hong Kong judges themselves. Along with their oaths taken to be justices of the UK Supreme Court, these judges owe a double allegiance and serve on the top courts of both jurisdictions at the same time.

The participation of the UK Supreme Court's justices in Hong Kong's judiciary is highly welcomed by the government of Hong Kong because it helps bolster the international reputation of the courts in Hong Kong. However, there have been calls advocating the discontinuation of this practice since the implementation of the controversial national security law in Hong Kong by China in July 2020. More specifically, members from both Houses of Parliament across the political spectrum have on various occasions either called for the termination of this practice or questioned the appropriateness of it.

In June 2021, Baroness Hale of Richmond, former President of the UK Supreme Court, announced her decision not to seek reappointment on the Hong Kong court after the end of her term in July while mentioning the impact of the national security law. She became the first senior British judge to quit Hong Kong's top court after the enactment of the security law. Amid the controversy, in August 2021, The Lord Reed of Allermuir issued a statement certifying that Hong Kong's judiciary "continues to act largely independently of government". However, about three months later, the US-China Commission submitted its annual report to US Congress detailing China's situation. In the report, not only did the Commission explicitly state that the independence of Hong Kong's judiciary existed "in name only", in direct conflict with The Lord Reed of Allermuir's certification, but also questioned whether or not overseas judges, including British judges, serving on Hong Kong's top court could still protect the rule of law in Hong Kong.

In a statement issued on 30 March 2022, the Foreign Secretary announced that the UK Government could no longer endorse British current judges sitting on the Hong Kong Court of Final Appeal, saying to do otherwise "would risk legitimising oppression". Soon after the government's announcement, on the same day, the president and deputy president of the UK Supreme Court, The Lord Reed of Allermuir and Lord Hodge, tendered their resignations as judges of the Hong Kong court. As of 30 March 2022, six retired British justices continue to sit on Hong Kong's top court.

== Building ==
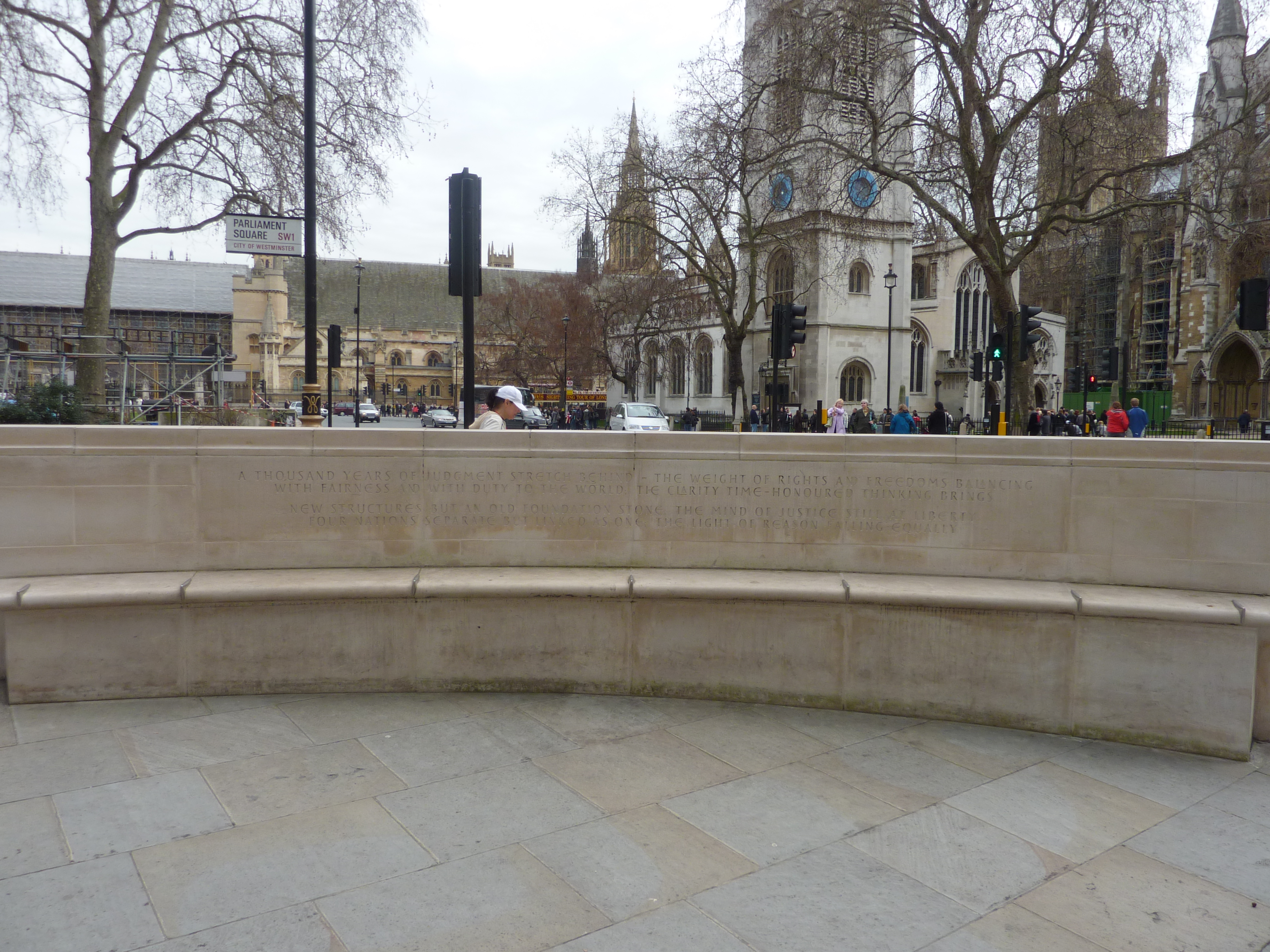
Bench and inscription outside UK Supreme Court, "Lines for the Supreme Court" by Andrew Motion

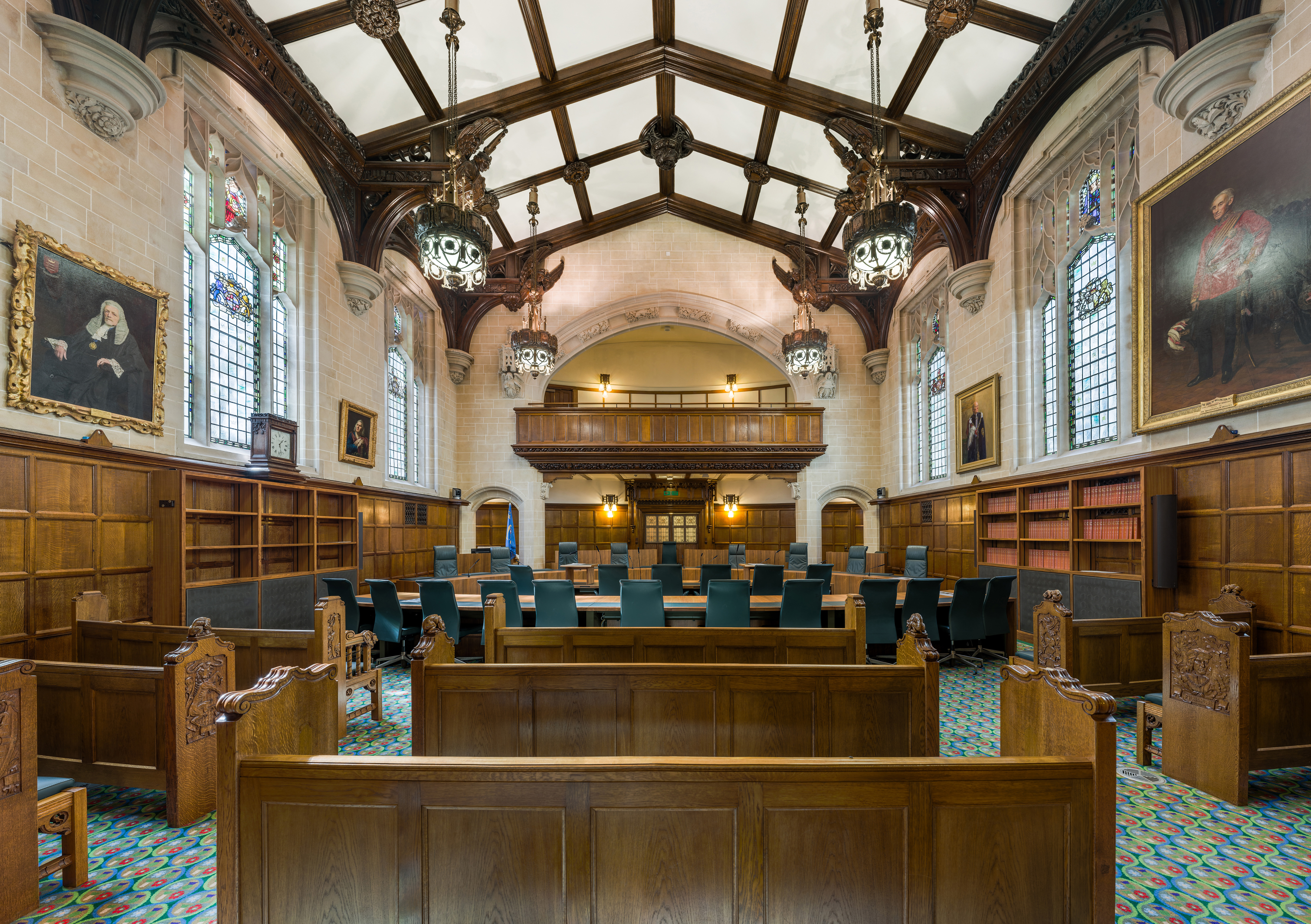
Court 1 in the Supreme Court building

The court is housed in Middlesex Guildhall—which it shares with the Judicial Committee of the Privy Council—in the City of Westminster.

The Constitutional Reform Act 2005 gave time for a suitable building to be found and fitted out before the Law Lords moved out of the Houses of Parliament, where they had previously used a series of rooms in the Palace of Westminster.

After a lengthy survey of suitable sites, including Somerset House, the Government announced that the new court would be at the Middlesex Guildhall, in Parliament Square, Westminster. That decision was examined by the Constitutional Affairs Committee, and the grant of planning permission by Westminster City Council for refurbishment works were challenged in a judicial review by the conservation group Save Britain's Heritage. It was also reported that English Heritage had been put under great pressure to approve the alterations. Feilden + Mawson, supported by Foster & Partners, were the appointed architects, with Kier Group appointed as main contractor.

The building had been used as the Middlesex Quarter Sessions House and the headquarters of the Middlesex County Council. Following the abolition of the council in 1965, its former council chamber became a courtroom, which is now Court One, the principal courtroom. In 1972 the building became a Crown Court centre.

== Symbols ==
The official badge of the Supreme Court was granted by Elizabeth II in October 2008. It comprises both the Greek letter omega (representing finality) and the symbol of Libra (symbolising the scales of justice), in addition to the four floral emblems of the United Kingdom: a Tudor rose, representing England, conjoined with the leaves of a leek, representing Wales; a flax (or 'lint') blossom for Northern Ireland; and a thistle, representing Scotland.

Two adapted versions of its official badge are used by the Supreme Court. One features the words "The Supreme Court" and the letter omega in black (in the official badge granted by the College of Arms, the interior of the Latin and Greek letters are gold and white respectively), and displays a simplified version of the crown (also in black) and larger, stylised versions of the floral emblems; this modified version of the badge is featured on the new Supreme Court website, as well as in the forms that will be used by the Supreme Court. A further variant omits the crown entirely and is featured prominently throughout the building.

Another emblem is formed from a more abstract set of depictions of the four floral emblems and is used in the carpets of the Middlesex Guildhall designed by Sir Peter Blake, creator of such works as the cover of The Beatles' 1967 album, Sgt. Pepper's Lonely Hearts Club Band.

The Supreme Court also has a flag, which is flown under the Union Flag when the court is sitting or delivering a judgment.

More covertly, the arrangement of the judges' bench and the main seating area of the courtroom, when viewed from above, resembles the shape of an eye.

The Blake emblem with stylised depictions of the four floral emblems

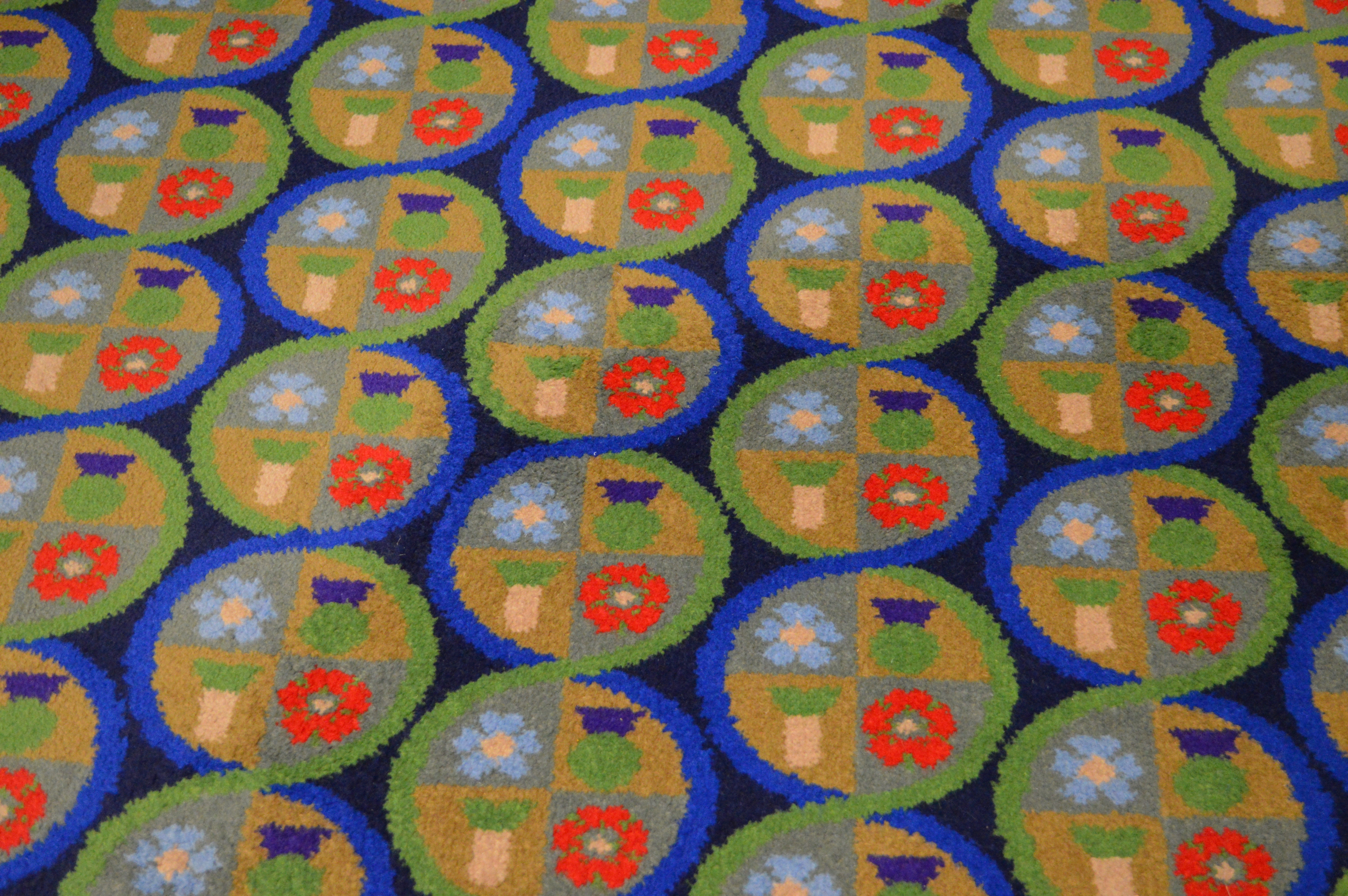
Blake's carpet for the Supreme Court buildings

The judiciary flag of the Supreme Court

=== Courtroom layout ===
The arrangement of the Justices' bench and the main seating area in the Supreme Court's principal courtroom forms an outline resembling an eye when viewed from above.

== Other "supreme courts" in the United Kingdom ==
In Scotland, the High Court of Justiciary, the Court of Session and the Office of the Accountant of Court make up the College of Justice and are known as the Supreme Courts of Scotland. The High Court of Justiciary is the supreme criminal court in Scotland.

Before 1 October 2009, there were two other courts known as "the supreme court". These were the Supreme Court of England and Wales (known as "the Supreme Court of Judicature", before the passing and coming into force of the Senior Courts Act 1981), which was created in the 1870s under the Judicature Acts, and the Supreme Court of Judicature of Northern Ireland. Each consisted of a Court of Appeal, a High Court of Justice and a Crown Court. When the provisions of the Constitutional Reform Act 2005 came into force these became known as the Senior Courts of England and Wales and the Court of Judicature of Northern Ireland respectively.

The Judicial Committee of the Privy Council also retains jurisdiction over certain matters. By section 4 of the Judicial Committee Act 1833, the sovereign may refer any matter whatsoever to the Judicial Committee of the Privy Council to provide advice, although this does not confer judicial authority.

The judicial functions of the House of Lords have all been abolished, other than the trial of impeachments, a procedure which has not been invoked for 200 years.

== See also ==
- Judiciaries of the United Kingdom
  - Courts of England and Wales
  - Courts of Northern Ireland
  - Courts of Scotland
- Judgments of the Supreme Court
- List of courts which publish audio or video of arguments
- List of House of Lords cases
- UKSCblog
