= Lord Reid =

Lord Reid may refer to:

- James Reid, Baron Reid (1890–1975), Scottish Unionist politician and judge
- John Reid, Baron Reid of Cardowan (born 1947), Scottish Labour Party politician and chairman of Celtic F.C.

== See also ==
- Robert Reed, Baron Reed of Allermuir (born 1956), Scottish judge and President of the Supreme Court since 2020
