= Richard Snowden =

Richard Snowden may refer to:

- Richard Snowden (ironmaster) (1688–1763), American ironmaster
- Richard Snowden, Lord Snowden (born 1962), British judge
- Richard Snowden Andrews (1830–1903), American architect and Confederate artillery commander
