= Tony Clarke, Baron Clarke of Stone-cum-Ebony =

British judge (1943–2026)

The Right Honourable The Lord Clarke of Stone-cum-Ebony PC QC
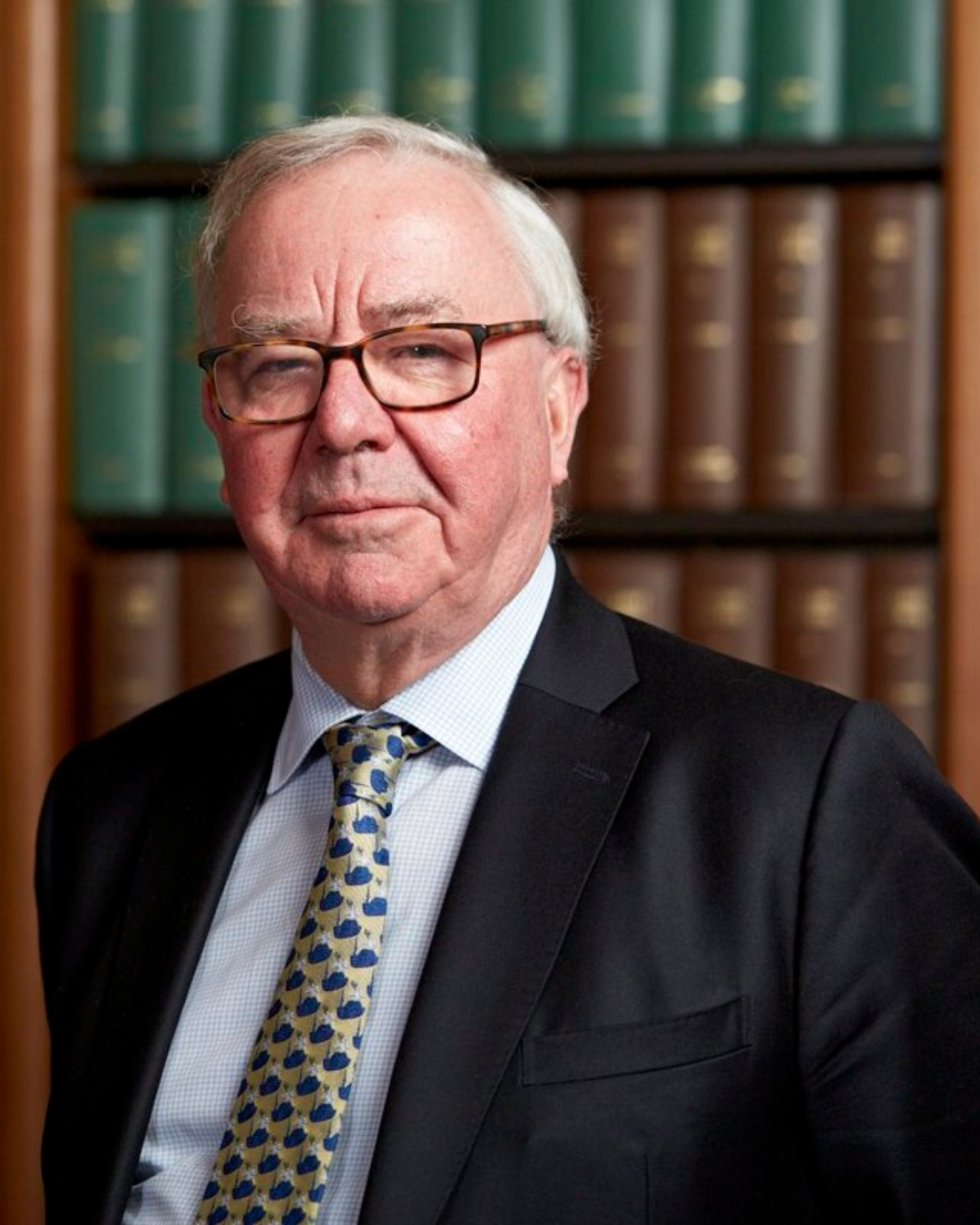
- Official portrait, c. 2016

Justice of the Supreme Court of the United Kingdom
- In office 1 October 2009 – 30 September 2017
- Nominated by: Jack Straw
- Appointed by: Elizabeth II
- Preceded by: Position created
- Succeeded by: Lord Lloyd-Jones

Member of the House of Lords
- Lord Temporal
- Life peerage 29 May 2009 – 14 September 2020

Master of the Rolls
- In office 3 October 2005 – 30 September 2009
- Preceded by: The Lord Phillips of Worth Matravers
- Succeeded by: The Lord Neuberger of Abbotsbury

Lord Justice of Appeal
- In office 1998–2005

High Court Judge
- In office 1993–1998

Personal details
- Born: Anthony Peter Clarke; 13 May 1943 Ayr, Ayrshire, Scotland
- Died: 16 April 2026 (aged 82)
- Spouse(s): Rosemary, Lady Clarke of Stone-cum-Ebony
- Children: 3
- Education: Oakham School
- Alma mater: King's College, Cambridge
- Occupation: Judge
- Profession: Barrister

Anthony Peter Clarke, Baron Clarke of Stone-cum-Ebony, PC QC (13 May 1943 – 16 April 2026) was a British lawyer and senior judge. He was one of the 11 founding Justices of the newly created Supreme Court of the United Kingdom, and was the first to be appointed directly to that court without previously having heard cases, as a Lord of Appeal in Ordinary, in the House of Lords. He retired from the Supreme Court in September 2017 at the age of 74.

Clarke was also a non-permanent judge of the Court of Final Appeal of Hong Kong from 11 April 2011. Clarke was previously Master of the Rolls and Head of Civil Justice in England and Wales.

== Early life and education ==
Clarke was born in Ayr on 13 May 1943, to Harry and Isobel (née Kay) Clarke. The family later moved to Lincolnshire. He was educated at Oakham School. In 1957 the trial of suspected serial killer John Bodkin Adams first made him interested in pursuing a career in the law. He read Economics and Law at King's College, Cambridge.

== Career ==
Clarke was called to the Bar at Middle Temple in 1965. He developed a commercial and maritime law practice.

He became a Queen's Counsel in 1979, and was a Recorder sitting in both criminal and civil courts from 1985 to 1992. In 1993, Clarke became a High Court judge and, as is customary, was appointed a Knight Bachelor. He was allocated to the Queen's Bench Division and, in April 1993, he succeeded Mr Justice Sheen as the Admiralty Judge. He sat in the Admiralty Court, the Commercial Court and the Crown Court, trying commercial and criminal cases respectively.

Clarke was promoted to the Court of Appeal of England and Wales in 1998 and sworn of the privy council. Shortly thereafter, he led the Thames Safety Inquiry and in the following year the judicial inquiry into the Marchioness disaster. He was Master of the Rolls from 2005 until 2009.

On 15 April 2009, it was announced that he would be created a life peer, his appointment was gazetted on 29 May 2009 with the title of Baron Clarke of Stone-cum-Ebony, of Stone-cum-Ebony, in the County of Kent. He took his seat, as a crossbencher, in the House of Lords on 1 June 2009.

It was announced on 20 April 2009 that Clarke was to be appointed to the Supreme Court with effect from 1 October 2009. He retired from the Supreme Court in September 2017. From that point, he was then able to sit in the House of Lords, which he did until his retirement from the House on 14 September 2020.

A member of the Shipwrights' Company, Clarke was an Assistant from 2000 and Prime Warden for 2014–15.

== Personal life and death ==
Clarke lived in Kent and London with his wife, Rosemary, née Adam, whom he married in 1968. They had three children—Ben, Thomas and Sally—and six grandchildren.

Clarke suffered from Alzheimer's disease in his later life. He died on 16 April 2026, at the age of 82.

== Arms ==
Coat of arms of Tony Clarke, Baron Clarke of Stone-cum-Ebony
Crest Emerging from rosemary foliage Proper a griffin's head erased and holding in the beak Gules a key in bend sinister the ward downwards Or. Escutcheon Or on a fess between three griffin's heads erased Gules a lion passant guardant dimidiating the hulk of an ancient ship Or. Motto Festina Lente (Diligently But Not Hurriedly)

== List of decided cases ==
- Pennington v Waine
- OFT v Abbey National plc
- Autoclenz Ltd v Belcher

== See also ==
- Judicial titles in England and Wales

== Notes ==
Legal offices
Preceded by The Lord Phillips of Worth Matravers	Master of the Rolls; 2005–2009	Succeeded by The Lord Neuberger of Abbotsbury
