= Justice of the Supreme Court of the United Kingdom =

British government official

- Style: The Right Honourable; Lord or Lady
- Appointer: The Monarch; on the advice of the Prime Minister following the Lord Chancellor's approval of a recommendation from an independent selection commission
- Term length: Justices are required to retire on becoming 75 years old; (Note: The Judicial Pensions and Retirement Act 1993 imposed a mandatory retirement age of 70 for all judges first appointed to the judiciary after 1995. The Public Service Pensions and Judicial Offices Act 2022 raised this age to 75.) may be removed on the address of both Houses of Parliament
- Formation: 1 October 2009
- Salary: £226,193
- Website: http://www.supremecourt.uk/

Justices of the Supreme Court of the United Kingdom are the judges of the Supreme Court of the United Kingdom other than the president and the deputy president of the court. The Supreme Court is the highest court of the United Kingdom for all civil cases, and for criminal cases from the jurisdictions of England and Wales and Northern Ireland. Judges are appointed by the British monarch on the advice of the prime minister, who receives recommendations from a selection commission.

The number of judges is set by section 23(2) of the Constitutional Reform Act 2005, which established the Supreme Court, but may be increased by Order in Council under section 23(3). There are currently twelve positions on the court: the president, the deputy president, and ten justices. Judges of the Court who are not already peers are granted the judicial courtesy title of Lord or Lady.

The Supreme Court of the United Kingdom is required to have judges with experience of, and practice in, the legal systems of England and Wales, Scotland or Northern Ireland. Once appointed to the Supreme Court, each judge acts as a representative for their distinct legal system in which they practice, whether it be English law, Scots law or Northern Ireland law.

== History ==
Lords of Appeal in Ordinary, colloquially known as law lords, were judges appointed to the House of Lords of the United Kingdom to carry out the House's judicial functions under the Appellate Jurisdiction Act 1876, which included serving as the final court of appeal for most domestic matters.

On 1 October 2009, the Appellate Jurisdiction Act 1876 was repealed by the Constitutional Reform Act 2005, which created the Supreme Court of the United Kingdom. The House of Lords thus lost its judicial functions and the power to create law life peers lapsed, although the validity of extant life peerages created under the Appellate Jurisdiction Act 1876 remains intact. Lords of Appeal in Ordinary who were in office on 1 October 2009 automatically became justices of the Supreme Court of the United Kingdom. At the same time, those Supreme Court justices who already held seats in the House of Lords lost their right to speak and vote there until after retirement as justices of the Supreme Court.

== Qualification ==
The Constitutional Reform Act 2005 sets out the conditions for the appointments of a President, Deputy President or Justice of the Court. That person must have held high judicial office (judge of the Supreme Court, English High Court or Court of Appeal, Northern Irish High Court or Court of Appeal, or Scottish Court of Session) for at least two years, or have held rights of audience at the higher courts of England, Scotland or Northern Ireland for at least fifteen years. This means it is not necessary for someone applying to become a judge of the Supreme Court to have judicial experience (allowing Jonathan Sumption, a leading barrister, to successfully apply for the role in 2011).

== Appointment ==
Judges of the Supreme Court are appointed by the King by the issue of letters patent, on the advice of the Prime Minister, to whom a name is recommended by a special selection commission. The Prime Minister is required by the Constitutional Reform Act to recommend this name to the King and not permitted to nominate anyone else.

=== Selection commission ===
The selection commission is made up of the President of the Court, another senior UK judge (not a Supreme Court Justice), and a member each from the Judicial Appointments Commission, the Judicial Appointments Board for Scotland and the Northern Ireland Judicial Appointments Commission. By law, at least one of these cannot be a lawyer. Should the President's place on the commission be unfilled, that place is to be taken by the next most senior judge of the court, either the Deputy President or, if they are also vacant, the most senior Justice. However, there is a similar but separate commission to appoint the next President, which is chaired by one of the non-lawyer members and features another Supreme Court Justice in the place of the President. Both of these commissions are convened by the Lord Chancellor.

=== Selection procedure ===
Once the commission is formed, there are a number of people it is required to consult. The first group is a set of "senior judges" defined by the Act who do not wish to be considered for nomination. Section 60 of the Act defines "the senior judges" as (a) the other judges of the Supreme Court, (b) the Lord Chief Justice of England and Wales, (c) the Master of the Rolls, (d) the Lord President of the Court of Session, (e) the Lord Chief Justice of Northern Ireland, (f) the Lord Justice Clerk, (g) the President of the King's Bench Division, (h) the President of the Family Division and (i) the Chancellor of the High Court.

In the event that no judge from one of the UK's three jurisdictions has been consulted (e.g. if the Lord President and Lord Justice Clerk, the two most senior judges in Scotland, both wish to be considered for appointment, they will both be excluded from the consultation), the commission must consult the most senior judge in that jurisdiction who is not a member of the commission and does not wish to be considered for appointment. The commission is then also required to consult the Lord Chancellor, the First Minister of Scotland, the First Minister for Wales and the Secretary of State for Northern Ireland.

The selection must be made on merit, in accordance with the qualification criteria of section 25 of the Act (above), of someone not a member of the commission, ensuring that the judges will have between them knowledge and experience of all three of the UK's distinct legal systems, having regard to any guidance given by the Lord Chancellor, and of one person only.

=== Lord Chancellor's role ===
Once the commission has selected a nomination to make, this is to be provided in a report to the Lord Chancellor, who is then required to consult the judges and politicians already consulted by the commission before deciding whether to recommend (in the Act, "notify") a name to the Prime Minister, who in turn advises the King to make the appointment. The Act provides for up to three stages in the Lord Chancellor's consideration of whether to do so:

1. When the selection is first put forward, the Lord Chancellor is entitled to accept the nomination, to reject it, or to ask the commission to reconsider.
2. If the nomination was rejected in Stage One, the commission must put forward a new name for Stage Two. The Lord Chancellor must either accept or ask the commission to reconsider. If instead the Lord Chancellor asked for reconsideration at Stage One, the commission may put forward either the same name or a new one. In either case, the Lord Chancellor must either accept or reject the name. In other words, the Lord Chancellor has one opportunity to reject and one to ask for reconsideration.
3. At Stage Three (i.e. when the Lord Chancellor has both rejected and asked once for reconsideration), the name put forward by the commission must be accepted and forwarded to the Prime Minister, with one caveat: in the event the commission was asked to reconsider a name and then forwarded a new name, the Lord Chancellor may choose to accept the earlier name.

== Original judges ==
The Supreme Court was established on 1 October 2009. It assumed the former judicial functions of the House of Lords, which were removed by the Constitutional Reform Act 2005. The twelve Lords of Appeal in Ordinary became judges of the Supreme Court, except for The Lord Scott of Foscote, who retired the day before the Court began business, and The Lord Neuberger of Abbotsbury, who resigned to become Master of the Rolls. A former Master of the Rolls, The Lord Clarke of Stone-cum-Ebony, became a judge of the Supreme Court on its first day, the first Justice directly appointed to the Court. Sir John Dyson was appointed as the twelfth member on 13 April 2010, the first Justice not to be a peer.

The Senior Law Lord on 1 October 2009, The Lord Phillips of Worth Matravers, became the Court's first President, and the former Second Senior Law Lord, The Lord Hope of Craighead, the first Deputy President. The Court originally had one female Justice, The Baroness Hale of Richmond; two Scottish justices, The Lord Hope of Craighead and The Lord Rodger of Earlsferry; and one Northern Irish Justice, The Lord Kerr of Tonaghmore.

Of the original justices, The Lord Saville of Newdigate was the first to retire, on 30 September 2010, and The Lord Rodger of Earlsferry was the first to die in office, on 26 June 2011. Lord Dyson stood down to become Master of the Rolls on 1 October 2012, the first time a Justice had left the Court to take up another judicial office. The last of the original justices to retire was The Lord Kerr of Tonaghmore on 30 September 2020.

=== List ===
- The Lord Phillips of Worth Matravers, first President (retired 30 September 2012)
- The Lord Hope of Craighead, first Deputy President (retired 26 June 2013)
- The Lord Saville of Newdigate (retired 30 September 2010)
- The Lord Rodger of Earlsferry (died in office 26 June 2011)
- The Lord Walker of Gestingthorpe (retired 17 March 2013)
- The Baroness Hale of Richmond (retired 10 January 2020)
- The Lord Brown of Eaton-under-Heywood (retired 9 April 2012)
- The Lord Mance (retired 6 June 2018)
- The Lord Collins of Mapesbury (retired 7 May 2011)
- The Lord Kerr of Tonaghmore (retired 30 September 2020)
- The Lord Clarke of Stone-cum-Ebony (retired 4 September 2017)

== Current judges ==
The most recent to join the court is Lord Snowden of Redcar, who joined on 15 June 2026 in place of Lord Richards of Camberwell. In order of seniority, they are as follows:

Name	Born	Higher education	Invested	Mandatory retirement	Prior senior judicial roles
The Lord Reed of Allermuir (President)	7 September 1956 (age 70)	University of Edinburgh School of Law; Balliol College, Oxford	6 February 2012	7 September 2031	Senator of the College of Justice: Inner House (2008–2012); Outer House (1998–2008)
Lord Sales (Deputy President)	11 February 1962 (age 64)	Churchill College, Cambridge; Worcester College, Oxford	11 January 2019	11 February 2037	Lord Justice of Appeal (2014–2018); Justice of the High Court, CD (2008–2014)
Lord Lloyd-Jones	13 January 1952 (age 74)	Downing College, Cambridge	2 October 2017	13 January 2027	Lord Justice of Appeal (2012–2017); Justice of the High Court, QBD (2005–2012)
Lord Briggs of Westbourne	23 December 1954 (age 71)	Magdalen College, Oxford	2 October 2017	23 December 2029	Lord Justice of Appeal (2013–2017); Justice of the High Court, CD (2006–2013)
Lord Hamblen of Kersey	23 September 1957 (age 69)	St John's College, Oxford; Harvard Law School	13 January 2020	23 September 2032	Lord Justice of Appeal (2016–2020); Justice of the High Court, QBD (2008–2016)
Lord Leggatt	12 November 1957 (age 68)	King's College, Cambridge; Harvard University; City Law School	21 April 2020	12 November 2032	Lord Justice of Appeal (2018–2020); Justice of the High Court, QBD (2012–2018)
Lord Burrows	17 April 1957 (age 69)	Brasenose College, Oxford; Harvard Law School	2 June 2020	17 April 2032	None: first Justice to be appointed directly from academia
Lord Stephens of Creevyloughgare	28 December 1954 (age 71)	University of Manchester	1 October 2020	28 December 2029	Lord Justice of Appeal (NI) (2017–2020); Justice of the High Court (NI) (2007–2017)
Lady Rose of Colmworth	13 April 1960 (age 66)	Newnham College, Cambridge; Brasenose College, Oxford	13 April 2021	13 April 2035	Lady Justice of Appeal (2019–2021); Justice of the High Court, CD (2013–2019)
Lady Simler	17 September 1963 (age 63)	Sidney Sussex College, Cambridge; University of Amsterdam	14 September 2023	17 September 2038	Lady Justice of Appeal (2019–2023); Justice of the High Court, QBD (2013–2019)
Lord Doherty	30 January 1958 (age 68)	University of Edinburgh School of Law; Hertford College, Oxford; Harvard University	12 January 2026	30 January 2033	Senator of the College of Justice: Inner House (2020–2026); Outer House (2010–2020)
Lord Snowden of Redcar	22 March 1962 (age 64)	Downing College, Cambridge; Harvard Law School	15 June 2026	22 March 2037	Lord Justice of Appeal (2021–2026); Justice of the High Court, CD (2015–2021)

== Acting judges and supplementary panel ==
Under section 38 of the Constitutional Reform Act, the President of the Court is empowered to request the service of additional judges on the Court, drawn from two categories of people: the first is any person serving as a "senior territorial judge", defined by section 38(8) as a judge of the Court of Appeal of England and Wales, the Inner House of the Court of Session, or the Court of Appeal in Northern Ireland (unless the judge holds the latter office only by virtue of being a puisne judge of the High Court in Northern Ireland). The Lord Judge occasionally sat on cases in the Supreme Court when he was Lord Chief Justice of England and Wales, as did Neuberger when he was Master of the Rolls. Both Reed (prior to his appointment to the Supreme Court) and Lord Clarke, judges of the Court of Session, sat on the Supreme Court during Rodger's last illness.

The second category of additional judges is the supplementary panel: approved Supreme Court justices and territorial judges who have retired from judicial service within the past five years and are younger than 75.

As of 2026 the supplementary panel consists of:

- The Lord Burnett of Maldon (former Lord Chief Justice of England and Wales)
- Lord Hodge (former Deputy President of the Supreme Court)
- Lord Kitchin (former Justice of the Supreme Court)
- Sir Declan Morgan (former Lord Chief Justice of Northern Ireland)

== Salary ==
As of 1 October 2019, justices of the Supreme Court, including the deputy president, were in Group 2 of the judicial salary scheme, with an annual salary of £226,193. This is the same group as the chancellor of the High Court, Lord Justice Clerk, president of the Family Division and president of the King's Bench Division. The president of the Supreme Court, Lord Chief Justice of Northern Ireland, Lord President of the Court of Session and Master of the Rolls make up Group 1.1 of the scale on £234,184, below only the Lord Chief Justice of England and Wales, who earns £262,264.

== Style and address ==
Following a Royal Warrant dated 10 December 2010, all justices of the Supreme Court who are not already peers are granted the judicial courtesy title of Lord or Lady followed by a surname, territorial designation or a combination of both, for life. Wives of male Supreme Court justices are styled as if they were wives of peers.

== Dress ==
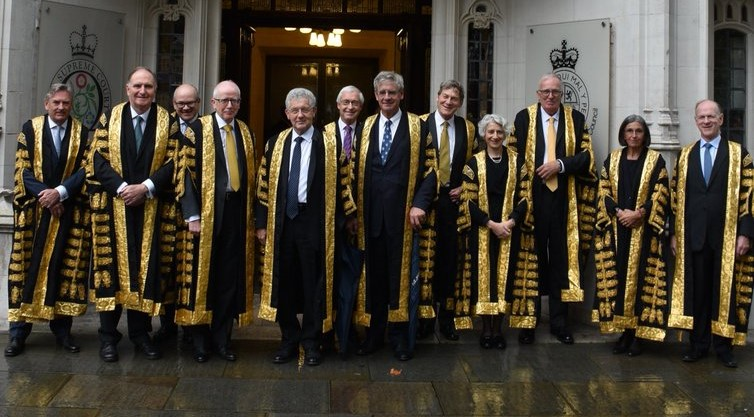
2024 group portrait of the Justices of the United Kingdom Supreme Court wearing ceremonial robes

On ceremonial occasions, such as the State Opening of Parliament, the ceremony at Westminster Abbey to mark the beginning of the judicial year, and at the swearing in of a new member of the Court, the justices wear ceremonial robes of black silk damask trimmed with gold lace and frogs, in the same pattern as the Lord Chancellor's state robes. The robe has no train, and the flap collar and shoulder caps bear the Supreme Court insignia.

The justices do not wear wigs or court dress as others in the legal and official positions do. The Baroness Hale of Richmond took to wearing a black velvet Tudor bonnet with gold cord and tassel which is the common headwear for doctorates in British academical dress. The robes were made by Ede & Ravenscroft with the embroidery by Hand & Lock.

On other occasions, the justices wear day dress. This follows the convention adopted by the Appellate Committee of the House of Lords, which was, technically, not a court but a committee of that House.

== See also ==
- Senator of the College of Justice
- Lord Justice of Appeal
- List of judges of the Court of Appeal of England and Wales
- High Court judge (England and Wales)
- List of High Court judges of England and Wales
- Judicial functions of the House of Lords
- Judicial Committee of the Privy Council
- List of Lords of Appeal in Ordinary
- List of law life peerages
- Nobles of the Robe

== Sources ==
- Chisholm, Hugh, ed. (1911). "Lords of Appeal in Ordinary" . Encyclopædia Britannica. Vol. 17 (11th ed.). Cambridge University Press. p. 6.
- May, Sir Thomas Erskine (1896). Constitutional History of England since the Accession of George the Third (11th ed.). London: Longmans, Green and Co. Archived from the original on 3 March 2004.
