= Nick Phillips, Baron Phillips of Worth Matravers =

British judge

The Right Honourable The Lord Phillips of Worth Matravers KG GBS PC
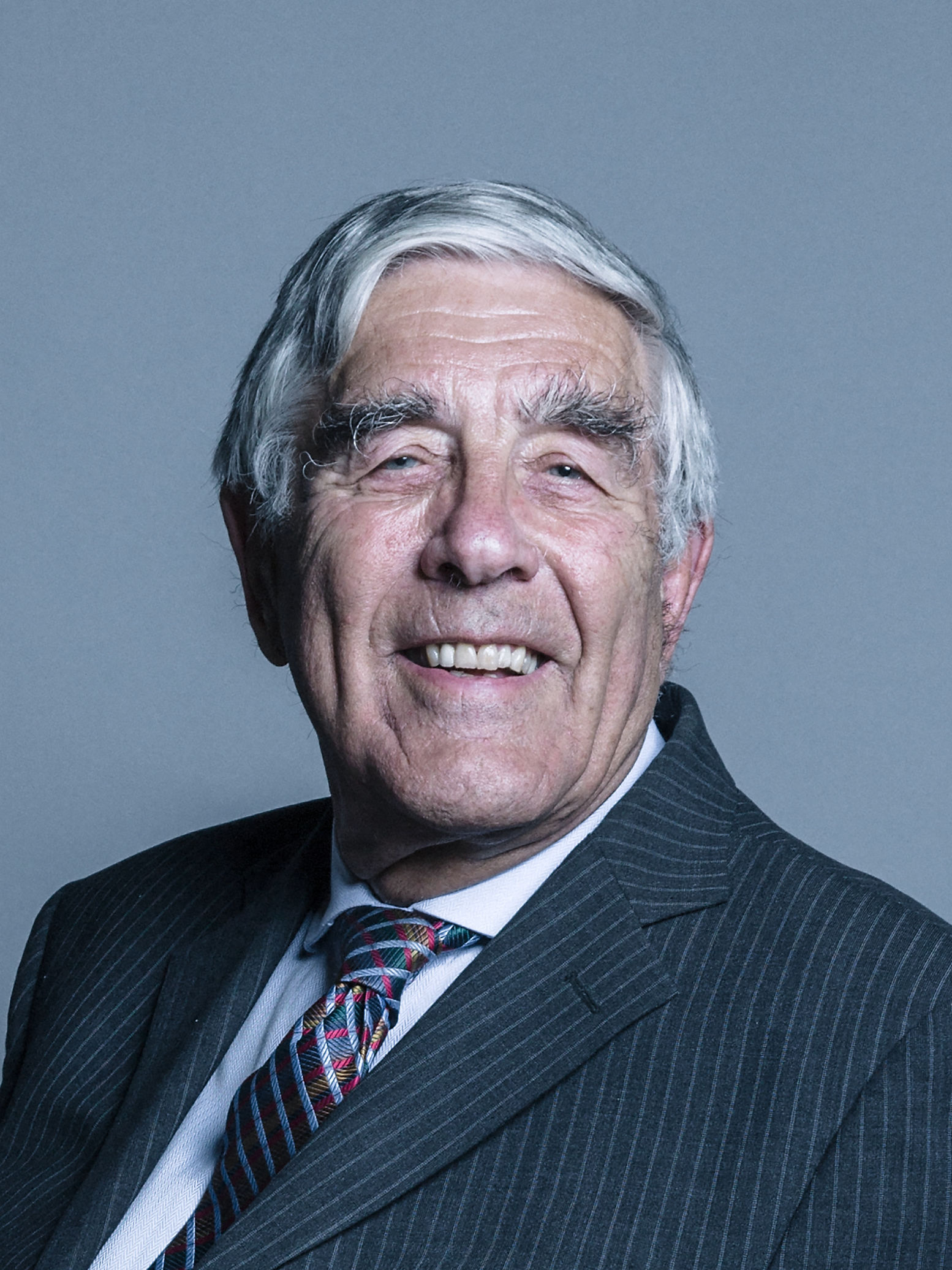
- Phillips in 2018

President of the Supreme Court of the United Kingdom (Note: Senior Lord of Appeal in Ordinary until 30 September 2009)
- In office 1 October 2008 – 30 September 2012
- Nominated by: Jack Straw
- Appointed by: Elizabeth II
- Deputy: The Lord Hoffmann; The Lord Hope of Craighead
- Preceded by: The Lord Bingham of Cornhill
- Succeeded by: The Lord Neuberger of Abbotsbury

Lord Chief Justice of England and Wales
- In office 3 October 2005 – 30 September 2008
- Nominated by: Lord Falconer
- Appointed by: Elizabeth II
- Preceded by: The Lord Woolf
- Succeeded by: The Lord Judge

Master of the Rolls
- In office 6 June 2000 – 3 October 2005
- Preceded by: The Lord Woolf
- Succeeded by: The Lord Clarke of Stone-cum-Ebony

Lord of Appeal in Ordinary
- In office 12 January 1999 – 6 June 2000
- Preceded by: The Lord Lloyd of Berwick
- Succeeded by: The Lord Scott of Foscote

Non-Permanent Judge of the Court of Final Appeal of Hong Kong
- In office 1 October 2012 – 30 September 2024
- Appointed by: Leung Chun-ying

Member of the House of Lords
- Lord Temporal
- Lord of Appeal in Ordinary; 12 January 1999

Personal details
- Born: 21 January 1938 (age 88)
- Spouse: Christylle Marie-Thérèse Rouffiac (died 2026)
- Children: 2, including Marie
- Education: King's College, Cambridge

Chinese name
- Chinese: 范理申
Transcriptions
Yue: Cantonese
- Yale Romanization: Faahn Léih Sān
- Jyutping: Faan^{6} Lei^{5} San^{1}

Nicholas Addison Phillips, Baron Phillips of Worth Matravers (born 21 January 1938) is a British former senior judge.

Phillips was the inaugural President of the Supreme Court of the United Kingdom, holding office between October 2009 and October 2012. He was the last Senior Lord of Appeal in Ordinary and the first Lord Chief Justice of England and Wales to be head of the English judiciary when that function was transferred from the Lord Chancellor in April 2006. Before his chief justiceship, he was Master of the Rolls from 2000 to 2005. He sits as a crossbencher.

== Early life ==
Phillips was born 21 January 1938. He was educated at Bryanston School (he was appointed a governor of the school in 1975, and has been chairman since 1981). He undertook National Service with the Royal Navy and the Royal Naval Volunteer Reserve, being commissioned as an officer.

After two years' military service he went to King's College, Cambridge, where he read law. In 1962, he was called to the Bar at the Middle Temple, where he was a Harmsworth Scholar. He undertook pupillage at 2 Essex Court Chambers (with the Anglo-American QC, Waldo Porges) and subsequently obtained a tenancy there, later moving to 1 Brick Court (now Brick Court Chambers). In 1973, he was appointed as Junior Counsel to the Ministry of Defence and to the Treasury in Maritime and Admiralty matters. On 4 April 1978, he became Queen's Counsel.

== Judicial career ==
In 1982, Phillips was appointed a Recorder and from 1987 was a full-time High Court Judge on the Queen's Bench Division, with the customary knighthood. He took an interest in legal training, and was Chairman of the Council of Legal Education from 1992 to 1997. He presided over several complex fraud trials including those covering the Robert Maxwell pension fund fraud and Barlow Clowes. In 1995, he became a Lord Justice of Appeal and was appointed to the Privy Council.

On 12 January 1999, he was appointed a Lord of Appeal in Ordinary and created a Life Peer under the Appellate Jurisdiction Act 1876 as Baron Phillips of Worth Matravers, of Belsize Park in the London Borough of Camden.

He then succeeded Harry, Lord Woolf as Master of the Rolls on 6 June 2000. He conducted an inquiry into the outbreak of bovine spongiform encephalopathy. He served as Lord Chief Justice of England and Wales from 2005 to 2008, when he was reappointed as a Law Lord.

Since 2008, Phillips was the Senior Lord of Appeal in Ordinary until he became the first president of the Supreme Court of the United Kingdom on 1 October 2009.

Queen Elizabeth II elevated him as a Knight Companion of the Order of the Garter on 23 April 2011.

On 11 October 2011, Phillips announced his retirement on 30 September 2012, almost four months before the mandatory retirement age for British judges at turning 75 on 21 January 2013.

After retiring from the bench, Phillips followed Woolf as president of the Qatar International Court at Doha He served on the court from 2012 to 2018. He also acts as an arbitrator.

In March 2012, the Government of Hong Kong SAR appointed Phillips as a Non-Permanent Judge of the Hong Kong Court of Final Appeal. He also serves as President of the British Maritime Law Association and Chairman of the European Maritime Law Organisation.

On 30 September 2024, Phillips announced that he would step down as a non-permanent judge of Hong Kong Court of Final Appeal after the end of his term on that day, owing to personal reasons.

== Personal life ==
Phillips was married to Christylle Marie-Thérèse Rouffiac until her death in June 2026, and lives in Hampstead, London. One of his two children is novelist Marie Phillips.

He is a member of Brooks's and the Garrick Clubs. He was also appointed the inaugural Distinguished Fellow and visiting professor of The Dickson Poon School of Law, King's College London.

Phillips received honorary degrees of Doctor of Laws (Hon. LLD) from Exeter (1998), Birmingham (2003), London (2004), Wake Forest University (2010), and the International Institute of Maritime Law, and of Doctor of Civil Law (Hon. DCL) from City University, London (2003).

He served as Chancellor of Bournemouth University from 2009 until 2018, being succeeded by broadcaster and author Kate Adie.

== Arms ==
Coat of arms of Nick Phillips, Baron Phillips of Worth Matravers
Coronet Coronet of a Baron Crest On a Rock of Fossil Limestone Proper a Leopard sejant Argent spotted Azure grasping with the dexter forepaw a Curtana Argent hilt pommel and quillons Azure. Escutcheon Azure a Fess Ermine between three Ammonites Argent ribbed Sable. Supporters On either side a Curlew Proper. Orders Garter circlet Banner The banner of the Baron's arms used as Knight Companion of the Garter depicted at St George's Chapel.

== See also ==
Decided cases

- Great Peace Shipping Ltd v Tsavliris (International) Ltd [2003] QB 679
- Shogun Finance Ltd v Hudson [2004] 1 AC 919
- Moore Stephens v Stone Rolls Ltd (in liq) [2009] 1 AC 1391
- R v Gnango [2012] 1 AC 827

== Notes ==
Legal offices
Preceded by The Lord Woolf	Master of the Rolls; 6 June 2000 – 3 October 2005	Succeeded by Sir Tony Clarke
Preceded by The Lord Woolf	Lord Chief Justice; 3 October 2005 – 30 September 2008	Succeeded by The Lord Judge
Preceded by The Lord Bingham of Cornhill	Senior Law Lord; 1 October 2008 – 30 September 2009	Abolished
New creation	President of the Supreme Court of the United Kingdom; 1 October 2009 – 30 September 2012	Succeeded by The Lord Neuberger of Abbotsbury
Preceded by None	Non-Permanent Judge of the Court of Final Appeal of Hong Kong; 2012–present	Incumbent
Academic offices
Preceded by The Lady Digby	Chancellor of the University of Bournemouth; 2009–present	Succeeded by Incumbent
Order of precedence
Preceded by The Lord Collins of Mapesbury; Non-Permanent Judge of the Court of Final Appeal	Hong Kong Order of Precedence; Non-Permanent Judge of the Court of Final Appeal	Succeeded by James Spigelman; Non-Permanent Judge of the Court of Final Appeal
