= Robert Reed, Baron Reed of Allermuir =

Scottish judge (born 1956)

The Right Honourable The Lord Reed of Allermuir PC FRSE
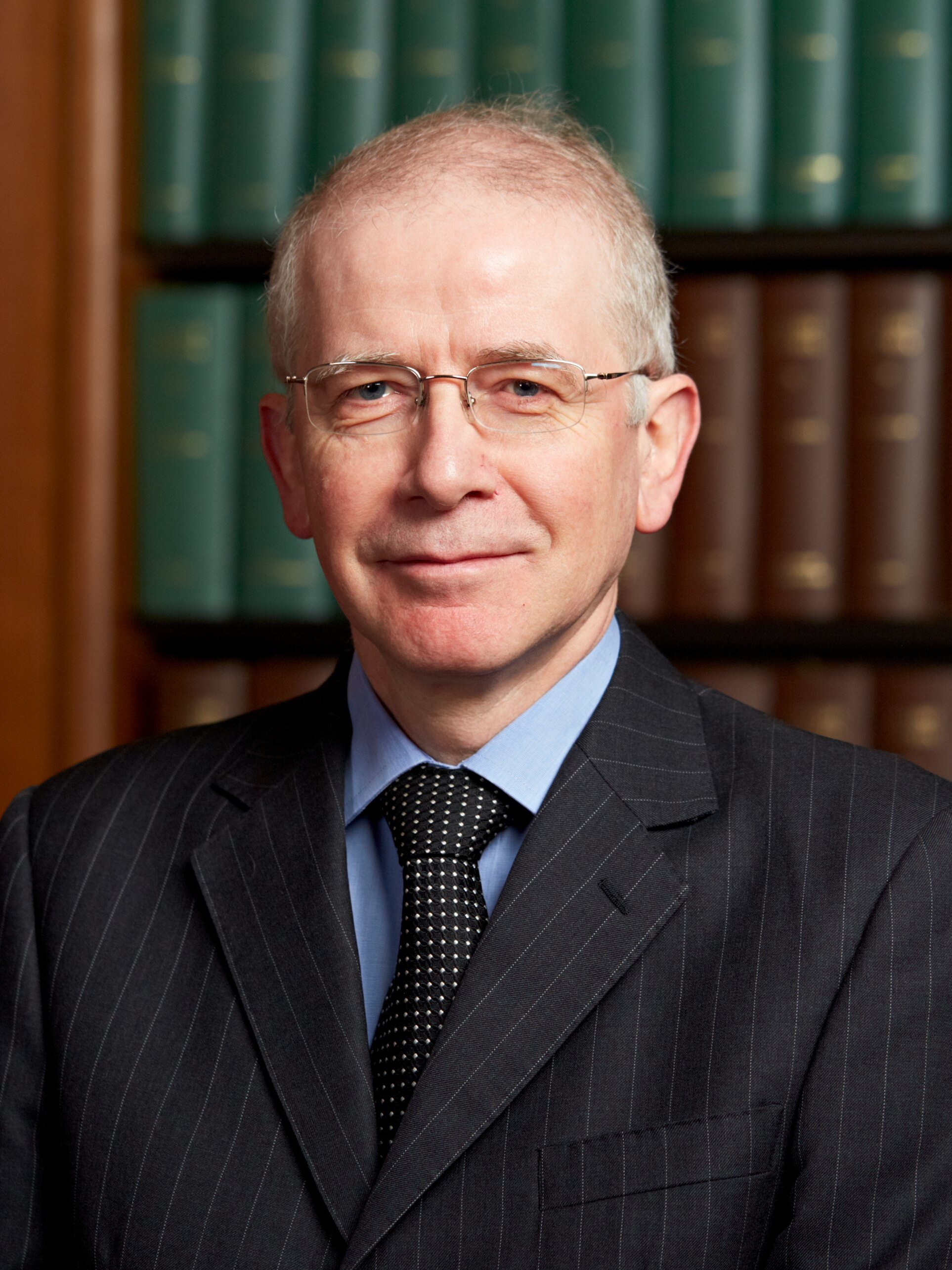
- Official portrait, 2022

President of the Supreme Court of the United Kingdom
- Incumbent
- Assumed office 13 January 2020
- Nominated by: David Gauke
- Monarchs: Elizabeth II; Charles III
- Deputy: Lord Hodge; Lord Sales
- Preceded by: The Baroness Hale of Richmond
- Succeeded by: Michael Briggs, Lord Briggs of Westbourne

Deputy President of the Supreme Court of the United Kingdom
- In office 7 June 2018 – 13 January 2020
- Nominated by: David Gauke
- President: The Baroness Hale of Richmond
- Preceded by: The Lord Mance
- Succeeded by: Lord Hodge

Justice of the Supreme Court of the United Kingdom
- In office 6 February 2012 – 7 June 2018
- Nominated by: Kenneth Clarke
- Monarch: Elizabeth II
- Preceded by: The Lord Rodger of Earlsferry

Senator of the College of Justice
- In office 1998–2012
- Nominated by: Tony Blair
- Monarch: Elizabeth II

Member of the House of Lords
- Lord Temporal
- Life peerage 11 January 2020 (Note: As a serving senior judge, Reed is currently disqualified from sitting in the House of Lords.)

Non-Permanent Judge of the Court of Final Appeal of Hong Kong
- In office 31 May 2017 – 30 March 2022
- Appointed by: Leung Chun-ying

Personal details
- Born: Robert John Reed; 7 September 1956 (age 70) Edinburgh, Scotland
- Spouse(s): Jane Mylne, Lady Reed (m. 1988)
- Children: 2
- Education: George Watson's College; University of Edinburgh (LLB); Balliol College, Oxford (DPhil)

Chinese name
- Chinese: 韋彥德
Transcriptions
Yue: Cantonese
- Yale Romanization: Wàih Yihn Dāk
- Jyutping: Wai^{4} Jin^{6} Dak^{1}

Robert John Reed, Baron Reed of Allermuir (born 7 September 1956), is a Scottish judge who has been President of the Supreme Court of the United Kingdom since January 2020. He has served as a Justice of the Supreme Court since February 2012, and was Deputy President of that Court for the 19 months immediately prior to his appointment as president.

He was the principal judge in the Commercial Court in Scotland before being promoted to the Inner House of the Court of Session in 2008. He is an authority on human rights law in Scotland and elsewhere; he served as one of the UK's ad hoc judges at the European Court of Human Rights. He was also, until 2022, a Non-Permanent Judge of the Court of Final Appeal of Hong Kong. In January 2026, Reed announced that he would retire from the Supreme Court on 10 January 2027.

== Early life ==
Reed was educated at George Watson's College in Edinburgh (where he was dux), and studied at the School of Law of the University of Edinburgh, taking a first-class honours LLB degree and winning a Vans Dunlop Scholarship. He then obtained a DPhil degree at Balliol College, Oxford, with a doctoral thesis on "Legal Control of Government Assistance to Industry", and was admitted to the Faculty of Advocates in 1983.

== Legal career ==
Reed was Standing Junior Counsel to the Scottish Education Department from 1988 to 1989, and to the Scottish Office Home and Health Department from 1989 to 1995. He was appointed Queen's Counsel in 1995, and Advocate Depute in 1996. He was appointed a Senator of the College of Justice, a judge of the Court of Session and High Court of Justiciary, the country's College of Justice, in 1998, with the judicial title Lord Reed. He sat initially as a Judge of the Outer House, becoming Principal Commercial Judge in 2006. He has been one of the United Kingdom's ad hoc judges at the European Court of Human Rights, and sat in the Grand Chamber judgements on the appeals of the killers of James Bulger in 1999.

Between 2002 and 2004, Reed was an expert advisor to the EU/Council of Europe Joint Initiative with Turkey. He was promoted to the Inner House (First Division) in 2008, and appointed to the Privy Council. He sat on the UK Supreme Court during the illness of Lord Rodger of Earlsferry, along with Lord Clarke, and succeeded Lord Rodger.

He has been Chairman of the Franco-British Judicial Co-operation Committee since 2005, and was President of the EU Forum of Judges for the Environment from 2006 to 2008, now serving as vice-president. He was a member of the advisory board of the British Institute for International and Comparative Law from 2001 to 2006, and of the UN Task Force on Access to Justice since 2006. He is Convener of the charity Children in Scotland (since 2006) and Chairman of the University of Edinburgh Centre for Commercial Law (since 2008). He has been an Honorary Professor of Law at Glasgow Caledonian University since 2005, and the School of Law of the University of Glasgow since 2006.

On 20 December 2011, it was announced that Reed would replace the late Lord Rodger of Earlsferry as a Justice of the Supreme Court of the United Kingdom. He was sworn in on 6 February 2012.

Lord Reed was Convener of the Children in Scotland Board from February 2006–March 2012. On 31 May 2017, he assumed office as a Non-Permanent Judge of the Court of Final Appeal of Hong Kong.

Reed was appointed Deputy President of the Supreme Court of the United Kingdom in May 2018, succeeding Lord Mance on his retirement. He was sworn into the new position on 6 June 2018.

On 25 January 2019, he was made an Honorary Fellow of The Academy of Experts in recognition of his contribution and work for Expert Witnesses. On 24 July 2019, the Queen declared her intention to appoint him President of the Supreme Court of the United Kingdom, and to raise him to peerage. He succeeded Baroness Hale of Richmond as president on 11 January 2020 on her retirement, and on the same day was created a life peer as Baron Reed of Allermuir, of Sundridge Park in the London Borough of Bromley. He was sworn in as president on 13 January and introduced to the House of Lords on 16 January.

Writing for the UK Constitutional Law Association, Lewis Graham of the University of Oxford examined the empirical evidence relating to judgments of the Supreme Court under Reed up to April 2022, and found that it has been "more conservative when it comes to public law" compared to previous years.

On 30 March 2022, Reed tendered his resignation from the Court of Final Appeal of Hong Kong, citing concerns about the national security law in Hong Kong.

On 16 January 2026, Reed announced that he would retire from the Supreme Court of the United Kingdom on 10 January 2027.

== Notable judgments ==
Lord Reed's judgments are characterised by an in-depth analysis of the common law. He has handed down judgements on various important topics of the law:

- AXA General Insurance Ltd v Lord Advocate [2011] UKSC 46: On the limits on the Scottish Parliament's powers
- Osborn v The Parole Board [2013] UKSC 61, [2013] 3 WLR 1020: On common law duty of procedural fairness
- Bank Mellat v Her Majesty's Treasury (No. 2) [2013] UKSC 39, [2014] 1 AC 700 (Dissenting)
- AIB Group (UK) plc v Mark Redler & Co Solicitors [2014] UKSC 58, [2014] 3 WLR 1367: On the causation requirement for a breach of trust
- R (Bourgass) v Secretary of State for Justice [2015] UKSC 54, [2016] AC 384
- Hesham Ali (Iraq) v Home Secretary [2016] UKSC 60, [2016] 1 WLR 4799
- R (Miller) v Secretary of State for Exiting the European Union [2017] UKSC 5, [2018] AC 61 (Dissenting): Lord Reed wrote the leading dissenting judgment in the Article 50 litigation, holding that the Government could initiate the UK's withdrawal from the European Union without reference to Parliament
- Investment Trust Companies v Revenue and Customs Commissioners [2017] UKSC 29; [2018] AC 275
- R (UNISON) v Lord Chancellor [2017] UKSC 51, [2017] 3 WLR 409: Declaring employment tribunal fees set by Lord Chancellor unlawful
- Robinson v Chief Constable of West Yorkshire Police [2018] UKSC 4, [2018] AC 736: the duty of care owed by police officers under the common law
- Morris-Garner & Anor v One Step (Support) Ltd [2018] UKSC 20, [2019] AC 649: On the availability of negotiating damages for breach of contract
- Jonathan Lu & Others v Paul Chan Mo-Po & Another [2018] HKCFA 11, (2018) 21 HKCFAR 94: On the concept of malice in the common law of defamation in the context of qualified privilege
- R (Miller) v Prime Minister [2019] UKSC 41, [2020] AC 373: Declaring the prorogation of Prime Minister Boris Johnson as unlawful (joint judgment with Lady Hale)
- WM Morrison Supermarkets plc v Various Claimants [2020] UKSC 12, [2020] 2 WLR 941: On vicarious liability
- Sevilleja v Marex Financial Ltd [2020] UKSC 31, [2021] AC 39: on the rule against reflective loss
- R (Begum) v Special Immigration Appeals Commission & Anor [2021] UKSC 7, [2021] 2 WLR 556: On whether Shamima Begum should be returned to the United Kingdom to challenge the Home Secretary's decision to deprive her nationality
- R (AAA) v Secretary of State for the Home Department [2023] UKSC 42: Declaring the Secretary of State for the Home Department's 'Rwanda policy' to send asylum-seekers in the UK to Rwanda to have their claims processed there instead as unlawful.

== Honours and awards ==
In 2015 Reed was elected a Fellow of the Royal Society of Edinburgh. Lord Reed is High Steward of the University of Oxford and succeeded Lord Rodger as Visitor of Balliol College, Oxford.

== Personal life ==
He married Jane Mylne, Lady Reed in 1988, with whom he has two daughters.

== See also ==
- List of Senators of the College of Justice

== Notes ==
Legal offices
Preceded by The Lord Mance	Deputy President of the Supreme Court of the United Kingdom; 2018–2020	Succeeded by Lord Hodge
Preceded by The Baroness Hale of Richmond	President of the Supreme Court of the United Kingdom; 2020–present	Incumbent
Preceded by None	Non-Permanent Judge of the Court of Final Appeal of Hong Kong; 2017–2022	Succeeded by Not Applicable
Order of precedence in England and Wales
Preceded by The Lord Forsyth of Drumlean as Lord Speaker	Gentlemen as President of the Supreme Court	Succeeded by Ambassadors and High Commissioners to the United Kingdom
