= Richard Snowden, Lord Snowden of Redcar =

British judge

The Right Honourable Lord Snowden of Redcar
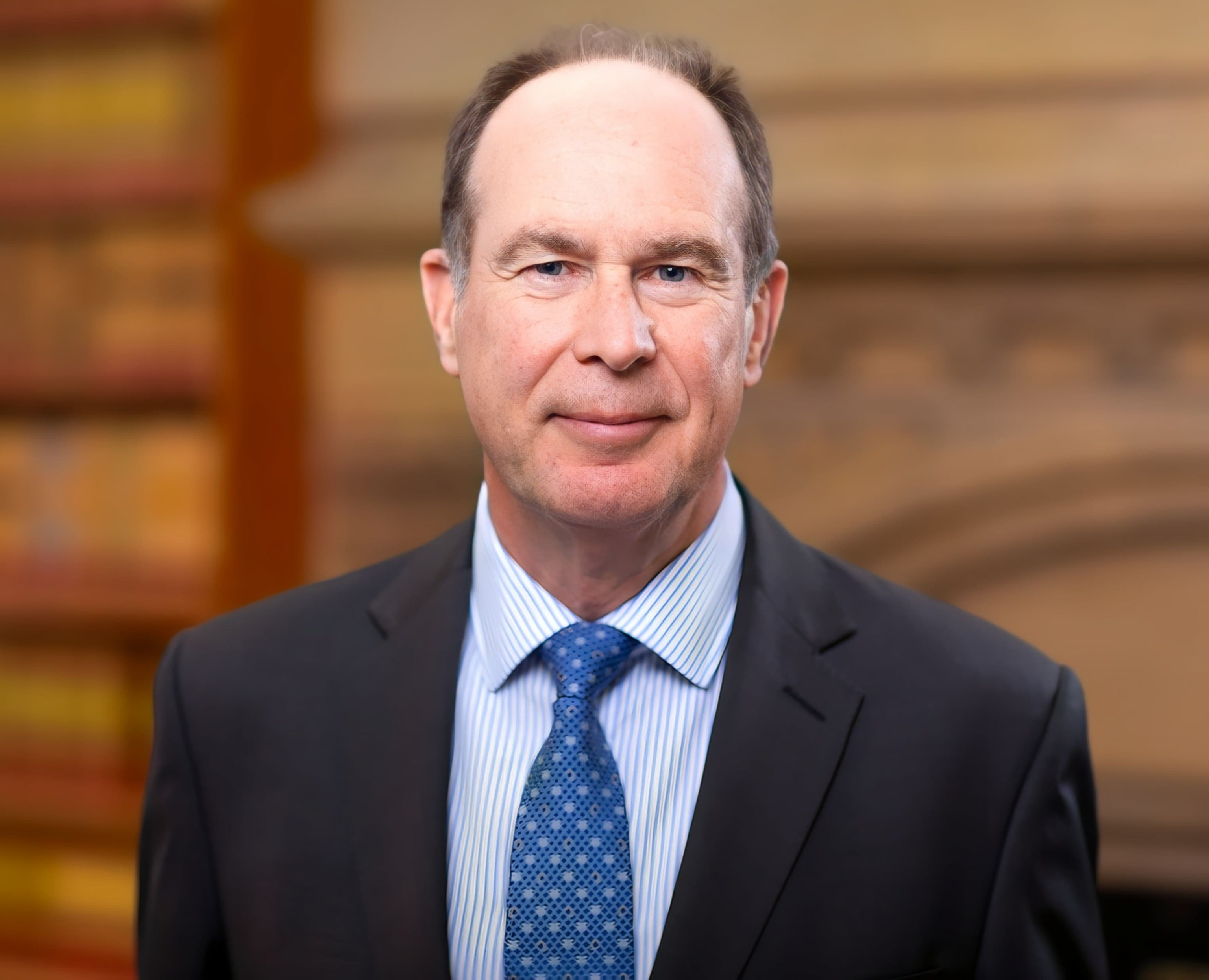

Justice of the Supreme Court of the United Kingdom
- Incumbent
- Assumed office 15 June 2026
- Nominated by: David Lammy
- Appointed by: Charles III

Lord Justice of Appeal
- In office 1 October 2021 – 15 June 2026
- Monarchs: Elizabeth II; Charles III

High Court Judge Chancery Division
- In office 2015–2021

Personal details
- Born: 22 March 1962 (age 64)
- Education: Downing College, Cambridge; Harvard Law School

Richard Andrew Snowden, Lord Snowden of Redcar, PC (born 22 March 1962), is a British judge serving as Justice of the Supreme Court of the United Kingdom. Prior to joining the Supreme Court, Snowden served as a High Court Judge of the Chancery Division and as a Lord Justice of Appeal.

== Biography ==
He grew up in Redcar, England, and was educated at Saltscar Comprehensive and Sir William Turner's Sixth Form College. Then he progressed to Downing College, Cambridge, and Harvard Law School. He was called to the bar at Lincoln's Inn in 1986, and elected a Bencher in 2010. He was appointed a Queen's Counsel in 2003, a Recorder in 2006, and a Deputy High Court Judge in 2008. He was a member of the Insolvency Rules Committee between 2002 and 2012. He also edited several works on company and insolvency law.

Snowden was appointed a Justice of the High Court (Chancery Division) on 30 April 2015, following the elevation of Mr Justice Sales to the Court of Appeal, and received the customary knighthood the same year.

On 19 September 2019, Snowden took on the role of Vice-Chancellor of the County Palatine of Lancaster and became Supervising Judge of the Business and Property Courts for the North and North-Eastern Circuits following Mr Justice Barling's retirement.

On 31 August 2021, it was announced that Snowden would be promoted to the Court of Appeal. He was appointed to the Privy Council on 15 December 2021.

On 30 April 2026, it was announced that Snowden would become a Justice of the Supreme Court of the United Kingdom. His appointment was subsequently confirmed by the Court. He was sworn in on 15 June 2026.

== Arms ==
Coat of arms of Richard Snowden, Lord Snowden of Redcar
Motto Constantia Et Fortitudine
