= Michael Briggs, Lord Briggs of Westbourne =

British judge (born 1954)

The Right Honourable Lord Briggs of Westbourne PC
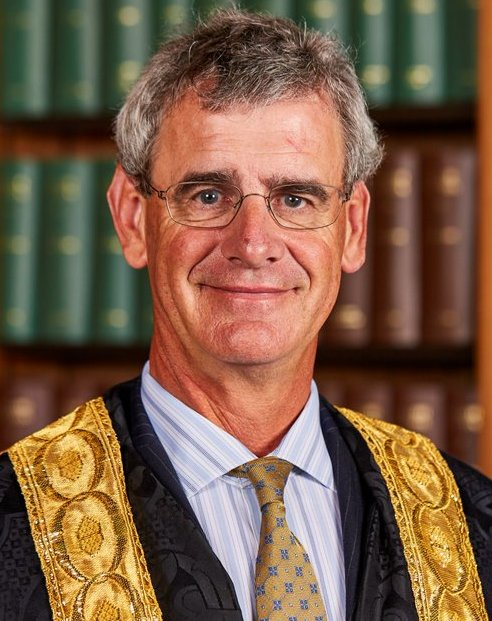

Justice of the Supreme Court of the United Kingdom
- Incumbent
- Assumed office 2 October 2017
- Nominated by: David Lidington
- Appointed by: Elizabeth II
- Preceded by: The Lord Neuberger of Abbotsbury

Lord Justice of Appeal
- In office 9 April 2013 – 2 October 2017

Vice-Chancellor of the County Palatine of Lancaster
- In office 2012–2013

Member of the House of Lords-designate
- Lord Temporal
- Life peerage TBD (Note: As a serving senior judge, Reed is currently disqualified from sitting in the House of Lords.)

Personal details
- Born: Michael Townley Featherstone Briggs; 23 December 1954 (age 71) New Forest, Hampshire, England
- Education: Magdalen College, Oxford (BA)

Michael Townley Featherstone Briggs, Lord Briggs of Westbourne, (born 23 December 1954) is a Justice of the Supreme Court of the United Kingdom. He served earlier as a judge of the Court of Appeal of England and Wales. He is known as one of the foremost active equity judges.

== Early life and education ==
Briggs was born on 23 December 1954 in New Forest, Hampshire, England, to Captain James William Featherstone Briggs, RN and Barbara Nadine Briggs (née Pelham Groom). He was educated at Charterhouse School, then an all-boys independent school in Surrey. He studied history at Magdalen College, Oxford, graduating with a Bachelor of Arts (BA) degree. He was an academical clerk (i.e. choral scholar) and as such sang in the college chapel's choir.

== Legal career ==
Michael Briggs was called to the bar at Lincoln's Inn in 1978 and was the Junior Counsel to Crown Chancery from 1990 to 1994. He became a Queen's Counsel in 1994. He was made a Bencher of Lincoln's Inn in 2001, and was appointed Attorney General of the Duchy of Lancaster on 24 July of that year. He held the post until shortly after his appointment to the High Court.

On 3 July 2006, he was appointed as a Justice of the High Court, receiving the customary knighthood and being assigned to the Chancery Division. From 2012 to 2013, Mr Justice Briggs was Vice-Chancellor of the County Palatine of Lancaster, a Chancery judge appointed by the Chancellor of the Duchy of Lancaster in consultation with the Lord Chancellor to supervise Chancery business and to hear cases in the North and North East.

On 9 April 2013, Briggs was an appointed Lord Justice of Appeal and consequently appointed to the Privy Council.

It was announced on 21 July 2017 that Lord Justice Briggs would become a Justice of the Supreme Court of the United Kingdom. He took office as a Supreme Court Justice on 2 October 2017, taking the judicial courtesy title of Lord Briggs of Westbourne.

Lord Briggs of Westbourne was elected the 517th Treasurer of Lincoln's Inn for 2024.

It was announced on 8 September 2026 that Lord Briggs of Westbourne would become the next President of the Supreme Court of the United Kingdom in January 2027, following the retirement of Lord Reed of Allermuir. As part of this appointment, Briggs will receive a life peerage but will not sit in the House of Lords while in office.

== Briggs report ==
Lord Justice Briggs was appointed as the Judge in charge of the Chancery Modernisation Review in 2013. The report was finally published in July 2016, and came to be referred to as the Briggs report. Part of those recommendations included proposals for a new online court to try and create a more affordable dispute resolution procedure.

== Notable judicial decisions ==
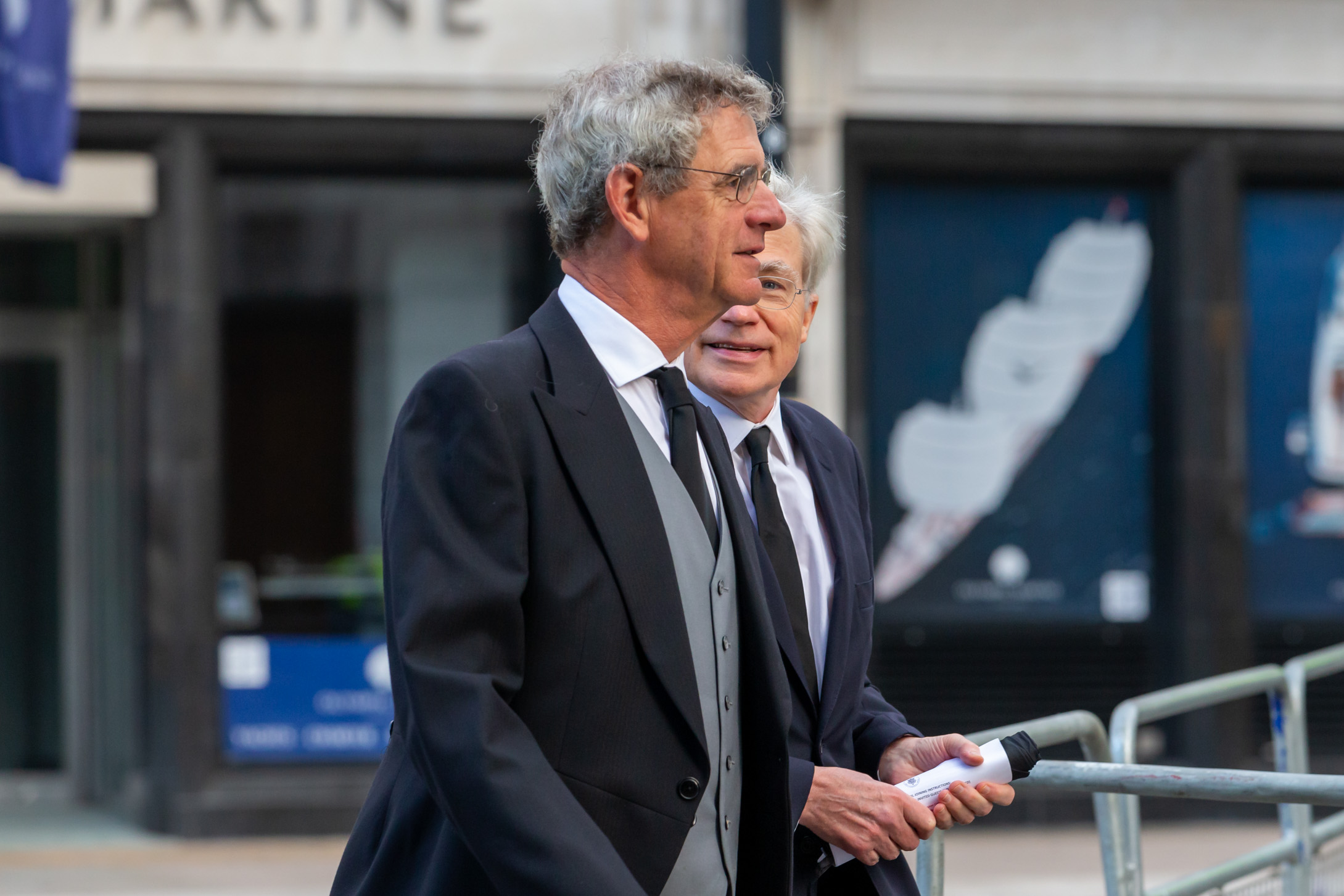
Lord Briggs of Westbourne arrives at the meeting of the Privy Council on 10 September 2022

Notable decisions of Lord Briggs of Westbourne include:

=== High Court ===
- Re Cheyne Finance plc [2008] EWHC 2402 (Ch), [2008] BCC 182, on the statutory definition of insolvency
- Assenagon Asset Management SA v Irish Bank Resolution Corporation Ltd [2012] EWHC 2090 (Ch), invalidating "exit consents" in bond documentation
- Lomas v JFB Firth Rixson Inc [2010] EWHC 3372 (Ch), on the proper construction of the standard form ISDA Master Agreement (upheld by the Court of Appeal on appeal)
- Breakspear v Ackland [2008] EWHC 220 (Ch), on beneficiaries' information rights under a discretionary trust
- Re Fort Gilkicker Ltd [2013] EWHC 348 (Ch) double derivative claims allowed

=== Court of Appeal ===
- Bellis v Challinor [2015] EWCA Civ 59, on Quistclose trusts
- In re Lehman Bros International (Europe) (No 4) [2015] EWCA Civ 485, on the "waterfall of payments" in insolvent liquidation
- Sharp v Leeds City Council [2017] EWCA Civ 33, on fixed costs for pre-action discovery

=== Supreme Court ===
- Guest v Guest [2022] UKSC 27, on remedies to proprietary estoppel and protecting expectations
- Rukhadze v Recovery Partners [2025] UKSC 10, on fiduciary duties

== Arms ==
Coat of arms of Michael Briggs, Lord Briggs of Westbourne
Motto E Colloquiis Sapientia
