= Patrick Hodge, Lord Hodge =

British judge (born 1953)

The Right Honourable Lord Hodge PC
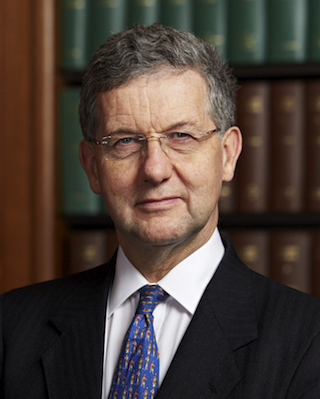
- Hodge, c. 2013

Deputy President of the Supreme Court of the United Kingdom
- In office 27 January 2020 – 31 December 2025
- Nominated by: Robert Buckland
- Appointed by: Elizabeth II
- President: The Lord Reed of Allermuir
- Preceded by: Lord Reed
- Succeeded by: Lord Sales

Justice of the Supreme Court of the United Kingdom
- In office 1 October 2013 – 26 January 2020
- Nominated by: Chris Grayling
- Preceded by: The Lord Hope of Craighead

Non-Permanent Judge of the Court of Final Appeal of Hong Kong
- In office 1 January 2021 – 30 March 2022
- Appointed by: Carrie Lam
- Preceded by: James Spigelman

Senator of the College of Justice
- In office 2005–2013
- Nominated by: Jack McConnell
- Monarch: Elizabeth II

Lord High Commissioner to the General Assembly of the Church of Scotland
- In office 28 February 2022 – 10 March 2024
- Preceded by: The Earl of Strathearn
- Succeeded by: The Duke of Edinburgh

Personal details
- Born: Patrick Stewart Hodge; 19 May 1953 (age 73) Scotland
- Education: Glenalmond College
- Alma mater: Corpus Christi College, Cambridge; University of Edinburgh

Chinese name
- Chinese: 賀知義
Transcriptions
Yue: Cantonese
- Yale Romanization: Hoh Jī Yih
- Jyutping: Ho^{6} Zi^{1} Ji^{6}

Patrick Stewart Hodge, Lord Hodge, PC (born 19 May 1953) is a Scottish retired judge, who served as Deputy President of the Supreme Court of the United Kingdom.

== Early life ==
Hodge was educated at Croftinloan School, a private junior boarding school in Perthshire, and Trinity College, Glenalmond, also in Perthshire. He studied at Corpus Christi College, Cambridge (BA), and the University of Edinburgh School of Law (LLB), and worked as a civil servant at the Scottish Office between 1975 and 1978, before being admitted to the Faculty of Advocates in 1983.

== Legal career ==
Hodge was appointed Standing Junior Counsel to the Department of Energy from 1989 to 1991, and to the Inland Revenue from 1991 to 1996, in which year he became Queen's Counsel. As a QC, his practice was mainly in commercial law, judicial review and property law. He served as a part-time Commissioner on the Scottish Law Commission from 1997 to 2003, and from 2000 to 2005 was a Judge of the Courts of Appeal of Jersey and Guernsey, and Procurator to the General Assembly of the Church of Scotland.

He was appointed a Senator of the College of Justice in 2005, taking the judicial courtesy title Lord Hodge. Like all Scottish judges on the Supreme Court, he has sat in both the Court of Session and High Court of Justiciary, but had particular responsibility as the Exchequer judge in the Court of Session.

Between 2009 and 2011, Hodge chaired the Church of Scotland's Special Commission on Same-sex Relationships and the Ministry.

On 1 October 2013, Hodge succeeded The Lord Hope of Craighead as a Justice of the Supreme Court of the United Kingdom. On 27 January 2020, Hodge was appointed Deputy President of the Supreme Court, succeeding Lord Reed who became president.

Hodge was nominated to Hong Kong's Court of Final Appeal on 5 October 2020, where overseas judges are allowed to serve part-time in addition to appointments in their home jurisdictions. He assumed office on 1 January 2021 to fill the vacancy left by Australian judge James Spigelman who had quit because of the concern over the controversial national security law enacted by China. In a joint letter, a group of 32 lawmakers from both houses of the UK parliament raised concerns about Hodge's appointment.

On 30 March 2022, he tendered his resignation as a Hong Kong judge, citing concerns about the national security law.

The Queen appointed Hodge to represent her as Lord High Commissioner to the Church of Scotland's 2022 General Assembly. King Charles III approved his reappointment in 2023. He was succeeded in this role by The Duke of Edinburgh on 10 March 2024.

On 17 December 2024, Hodge announced his intention to retire from the Supreme Court on 31 December 2025.

Hodge sits on the editorial board of the Current Legal Problems journal.

== Personal life ==
Hodge married Penelope Jane Wigin in 1983, with whom he has two sons and a daughter. His interests include opera and skiing, and he is a member of Bruntsfield Links Golfing Society. He has been a Governor of Merchiston Castle School, Edinburgh, since 1998.

== See also ==
- List of Senators of the College of Justice

Legal offices
Preceded by The Lord Reed of Allermuir	Deputy President of the Supreme Court of the United Kingdom; 2020–2025	Succeeded by Lord Sales
Preceded by The Lord Hope of Craighead	Justice of the Supreme Court of the United Kingdom; 2013–2020	Succeeded by
Preceded by	Senator of the College of Justice; 2005–2013	Succeeded by
Preceded by James Spigelman	Non-Permanent Judge of the Court of Final Appeal of Hong Kong; 2021–2022	Succeeded by Not Applicable
