= President of the Supreme Court of the United Kingdom =

Presiding officer of the Supreme Court of the United Kingdom

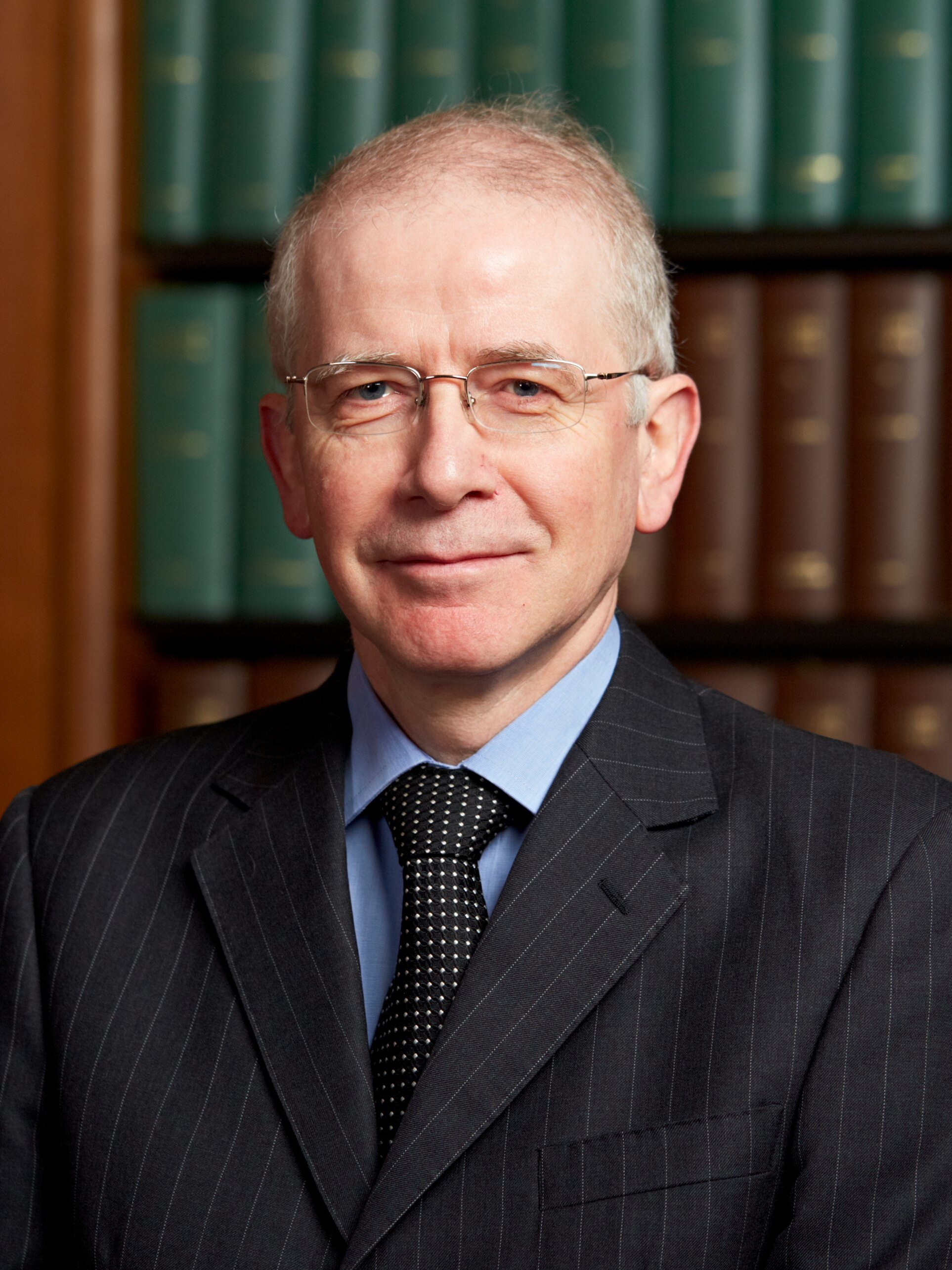
- Incumbent; The Lord Reed of Allermuir since 13 January 2020
- Supreme Court of the United Kingdom
- Style: The Right Honourable; My Lord/Lady (when addressed in court)
- Status: Chief Justice
- Seat: Middlesex Guildhall, London
- Appointer: The Monarch on the advice of the Prime Minister; following the Secretary of State for Justice's approval of a recommendation
- Term length: Life tenure (with a mandatory retirement age (Note: The mandatory retirement age for judicial offices —including the judges of the Supreme Court— is 70, as introduced in the Judicial Pensions and Retirement Act 1993. However, that only applies to judges first appointed to a judicial office after the commencement of the relevant provisions of that Act (31 March 1995). Judges who were appointed before (and have served continuously since) that date have the same mandatory retirement age as was applicable in their office before the Act, which is 75.)); may be removed by Parliament
- Constituting instrument: Constitutional Reform Act 2005, Part 3, Section 23(5)
- Precursor: Senior Lord of Appeal in Ordinary
- Formation: 1 October 2009
- First holder: Lord Reid as Senior Lord of Appeal in Ordinary; Nick Phillips as President of the Supreme Court (1 October 2009)
- Deputy: Deputy President of the Supreme Court
- Salary: £214,165
- Website: www.supremecourt.uk

The president of the Supreme Court of the United Kingdom is the highest-ranking judge in the Supreme Court of the United Kingdom. It is equivalent to the now-defunct position of senior lord of appeal in ordinary, also known as the senior law lord, who was the highest ranking among the Lords of Appeal in Ordinary (the judges who exercised the judicial functions of the House of Lords). The current President is Robert Reed, since 13 January 2020.

== History ==
From 1900 to 1969, when the lord chancellor was not present, a former lord chancellor would preside at judicial sittings of the House of Lords. If no former lord chancellor was present, the most senior lord of appeal in ordinary present would preside, seniority being determined by rank in the peerage. In the years following World War II, it became less common for lord chancellors to have time to gain judicial experience in office, making it anomalous for former holders of the office to take precedence. As a result, on 22 May 1969, the rules were changed such that if the lord chancellor was not present (as was normally the case), the most senior law lord, by appointment as a lord of appeal in ordinary rather than peerage, would preside.

In 1984, the system was amended to provide that judges be appointed as senior and second senior lords of appeal in ordinary, rather than taking the roles by seniority. The purpose of the change was to allow an ailing Lord Diplock to step aside from presiding, yet remain a law lord.

On 1 October 2009, the judicial functions of the House of Lords were transferred to the new Supreme Court under the provisions of the Constitutional Reform Act 2005. The Senior Law Lord, Nick Phillips, and the Second Senior Law Lord became, respectively, the President and the Deputy President of the new court. The same day, the Queen by warrant established a place for the President of the Supreme Court in the order of precedence, immediately after the Lord Speaker (the Speaker of the House of Lords).

== List of Senior Lords of Appeal in Ordinary ==
- James Reid, Baron Reid (1969–1975)
- Richard Wilberforce, Baron Wilberforce (1975–1982)
- Kenneth Diplock, Baron Diplock (1982–1984)
- Ian Fraser, Baron Fraser of Tullybelton (1984–1985)
- Leslie Scarman, Baron Scarman (1985–1986)
- Henry Keith, Baron Keith of Kinkel (1986–1996)
- Robert Goff, Baron Goff of Chieveley (1996–1998)
- Nick Browne-Wilkinson, Baron Browne-Wilkinson (1998–2000)
- Tom Bingham, Baron Bingham of Cornhill (2000–2008)
- Nick Phillips, Baron Phillips of Worth Matravers (2008 – 30 September 2009)

== List of presidents of the Supreme Court ==
#	Image	Name	Born-Died	Alma mater	Presidency started	Presidency ended	Duration	Prior senior judicial roles
1		Nicholas Phillips, Baron Phillips of Worth Matravers	21 January 1938 (age 88)	King's College, Cambridge	1 October 2009	30 September 2012	3 years and 0 days	Senior Lord of Appeal in Ordinary (2008–2009); Lord Chief Justice of England and Wales (2005–2008); Master of the Rolls (2000–2005); Lord of Appeal in Ordinary (1999–2000)
2		David Neuberger, Baron Neuberger of Abbotsbury	10 January 1948 (age 78)	Christ Church, Oxford	1 October 2012	4 September 2017	4 years and 342 days	Master of the Rolls (2009–2012); Lord of Appeal in Ordinary (2007–2009); Lord Justice of Appeal (2004–2007)
3		Brenda Hale, Baroness Hale of Richmond	31 January 1945 (age 81)	Girton College, Cambridge	5 September 2017	10 January 2020	2 years and 128 days	Deputy President of the Supreme Court of the United Kingdom (2013–2017); Justice of the Supreme Court of the United Kingdom (2009–2013); Lord of Appeal in Ordinary (2004–2009); Lord Justice of Appeal (1999–2003); Justice of the High Court, Family Division (1994–1999)
4		Robert Reed, Baron Reed of Allermuir	7 September 1956 (age 70)	University of Edinburgh; Balliol College, Oxford	13 January 2020	Incumbent, (retires 10 January 2027)	6 years and 278 days	Deputy President of the Supreme Court of the United Kingdom (2018–2020); Justice of the Supreme Court of the United Kingdom (2012–2018); Senator of the College of Justice (1998–2012)
5		Michael Briggs, Lord Briggs of Westbourne	23 December 1954 (age 71)	Magdalen College, Oxford	January 2027 (Upcoming)	Presidency not started		Justice of the Supreme Court of the United Kingdom (2017–2027, Incumbent); Lord Justice of Appeal (2013–2017); Vice-Chancellor of the County Palatine of Lancaster (2012–2013)

== See also ==
- Deputy President of the Supreme Court of the United Kingdom
- Justice of the Supreme Court of the United Kingdom
- Senior President of Tribunals
- Lord Chief Justice of England and Wales
- Lord President of the Court of Session
