= Raymond Doherty, Lord Doherty =

Scottish lawyer and judge

The Right Honourable Lord Doherty
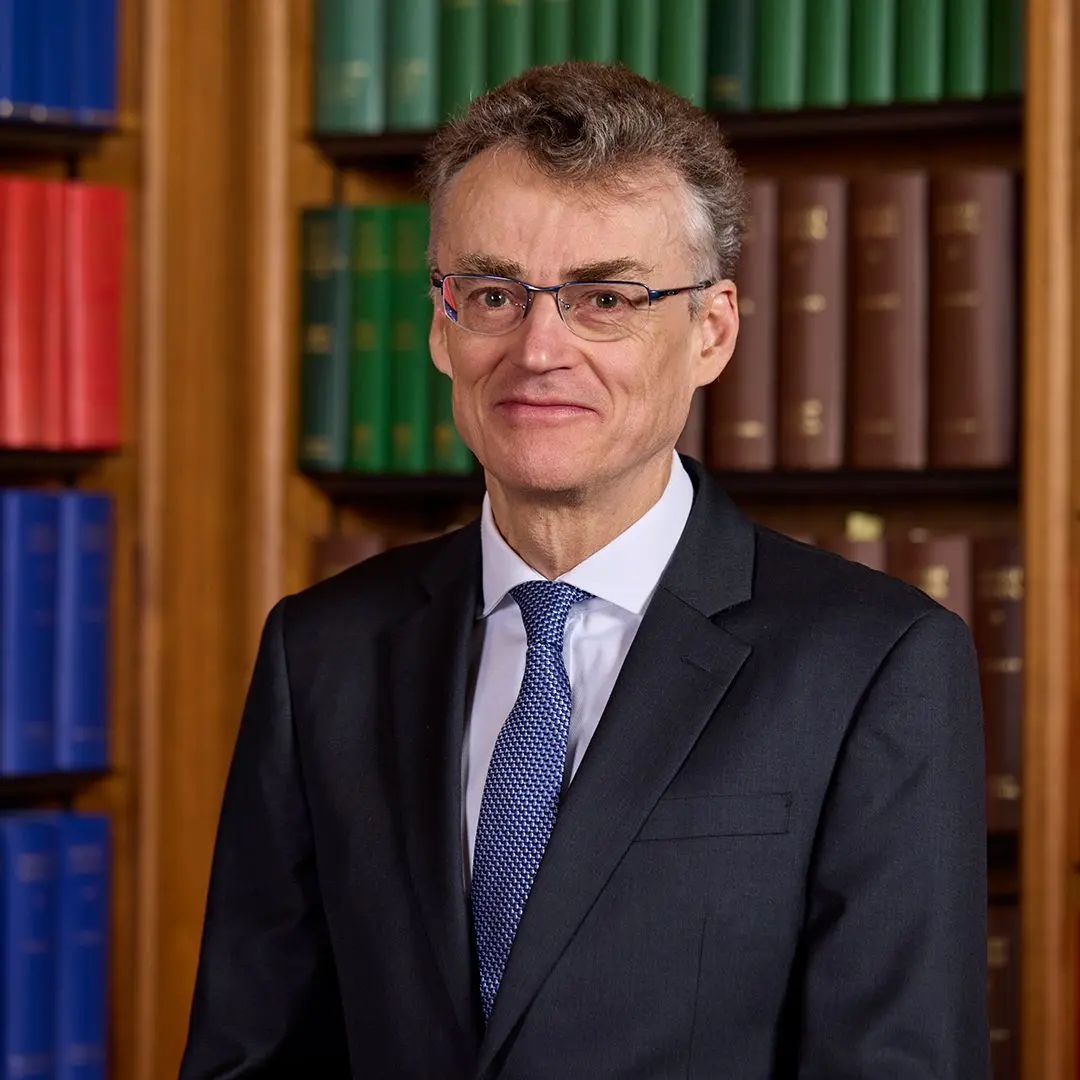
- Doherty in 2026

Justice of the Supreme Court of the United Kingdom
- Incumbent
- Assumed office 12 January 2026
- Nominated by: David Lammy
- Appointed by: Charles III

Senator of the College of Justice
- In office May 2010 – 12 January 2026
- Nominated by: Alex Salmond; As First Minister
- Monarch: Elizabeth II

Personal details
- Born: Joseph Raymond Doherty; 30 January 1958 (age 68)
- Education: University of Edinburgh, University of Oxford, Harvard University
- Profession: Advocate, Judge

Joseph Raymond Doherty, Lord Doherty, PC (born 30 January 1958) is a Scottish judge who currently serves as a Justice of the Supreme Court of the United Kingdom, having previously served as a Senator of the College of Justice, a judge of the Supreme Courts of Scotland.

== Early life ==
Doherty studied at the School of Law of the University of Edinburgh (LLB), Hertford College, Oxford (BCL) and Harvard University (LLM). He was admitted to the Faculty of Advocates in 1984.

== Legal career ==
In 1990, he was elected Clerk of the Faculty, holding that office until 1995. He served as Standing Junior Counsel (legal advisor) to the Ministry of Defence from 1990 to 1991 and to the Industry Department of the Scottish Office from 1991 to 1997, at which time he was appointed Queen's Counsel. From 1998 to 2001, he was an Advocate Depute.

=== The Bench ===
In April 2010, he was appointed a Senator of the College of Justice, a judge of the Court of Session and High Court of Justiciary, the Supreme Courts of Scotland, taking the judicial title Lord Doherty. He heard the case brought by a number of Scottish politicians, including Andy Wightman and Joanna Cherry, which sought an answer to the question on whether the United Kingdom could unilaterally withdraw its notice of its intention to leave the European Union. Lord Doherty refused permission for judicial review, but this decision was overturned by the Inner House of the Court of Session.

It was announced on 17 February 2020 that Lord Doherty had been appointed to the Inner House of the Court of Session with effect from December 2020. He was sworn of Her Majesty's Privy Council on 12 April 2022 allowing him the honorific The Right Honourable.

On 17 November 2025 it was announced that Doherty would become a Justice of the Supreme Court of the United Kingdom, being sworn into office on 12 January 2026.
