= Lawrence Collins, Baron Collins of Mapesbury =

British former judge (born 1941)

The Right Honourable The Lord Collins of Mapesbury PC FBA
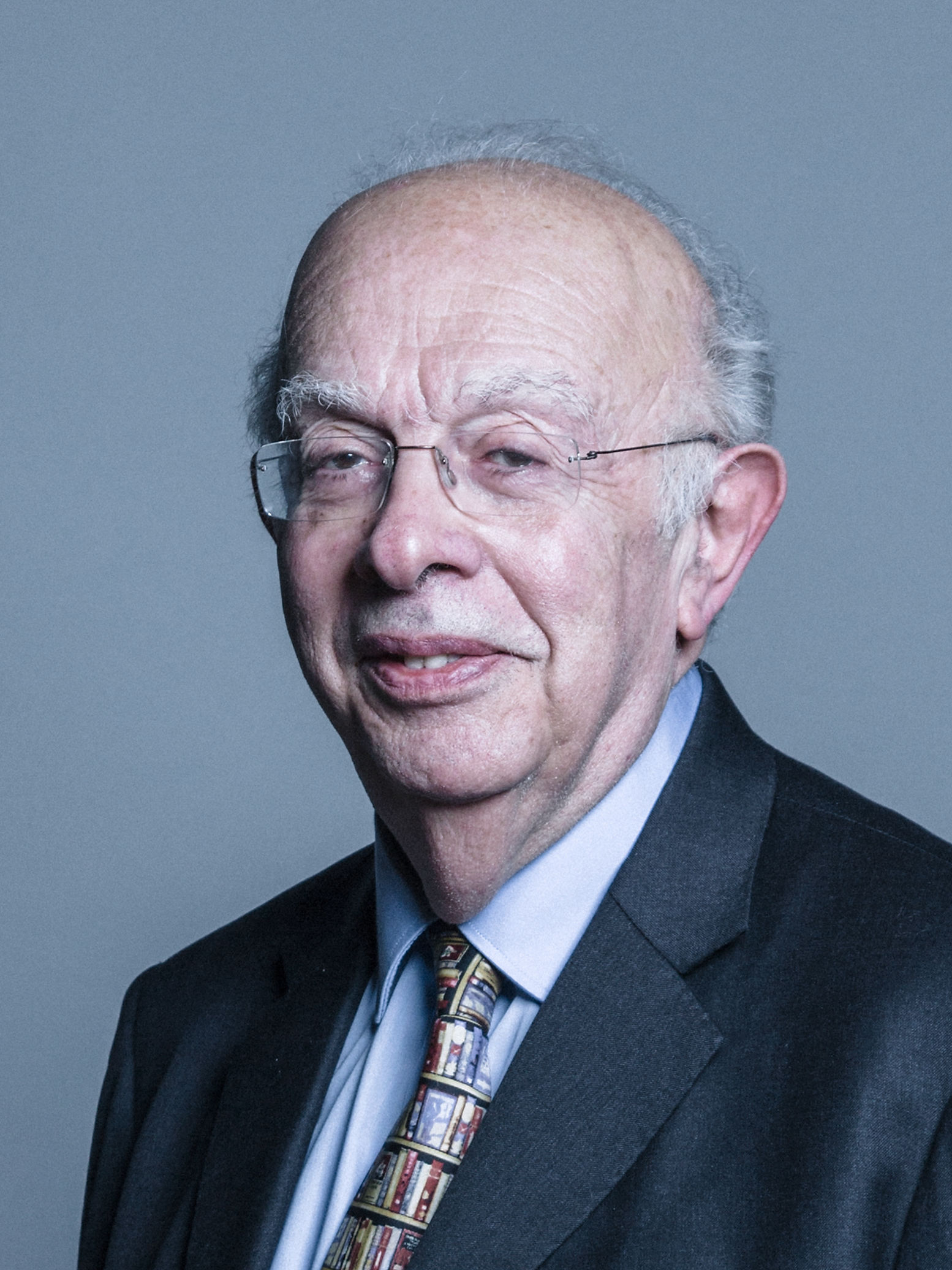

Justice of the Supreme Court of the United Kingdom (Note: Lord of Appeal in Ordinary until 30 September 2009)
- In office 20 April 2009 – 7 May 2011
- Nominated by: Jack Straw
- Appointed by: Elizabeth II
- Preceded by: The Lord Hoffmann
- Succeeded by: Lord Sumption

Lord Justice of Appeal
- In office 2007–2009

High Court Judge
- In office 2000–2007

Non-Permanent Judge of the Court of Final Appeal of Hong Kong
- In office 30 June 2011 – 5 June 2024
- Appointed by: Donald Tsang

Member of the House of Lords
- Lord Temporal
- Lord of Appeal in Ordinary; 21 April 2009 – 18 May 2026

Personal details
- Born: Lawrence Antony Collins; 7 May 1941 (age 85)
- Education: Downing College, Cambridge (BA); Columbia University (LLM)

Chinese name
- Chinese: 郝廉思
Transcriptions
Yue: Cantonese
- Yale Romanization: Kok Lìhm Sī
- Jyutping: Kok^{3} Lim^{4} Si^{1}

Lawrence Antony Collins, Baron Collins of Mapesbury (born 7 May 1941) is a British judge and former Justice of the Supreme Court of the United Kingdom. He was also appointed to the Court of Final Appeal of Hong Kong on 11 April 2011 as a non-permanent judge from other common law jurisdictions. He resigned from the court on 6 June 2024 due to the political situation in Hong Kong.

He was formerly a partner in the British law firm Herbert Smith. He is now a full time international arbitrator, Chair of Laws at UCL Faculty of Laws.

== Early life and education ==
Collins was born on 7 May 1941. He is Jewish. He was educated at the City of London School, and then at Downing College, Cambridge, graduating with a starred first in Law. He received an LL.M. degree from Columbia Law School in New York City and was admitted as a solicitor in 1968, becoming a partner at Herbert Smith in 1971 until his appointment as a judge in 2000.

He served as head of the Litigation and Arbitration Department at Herbert Smith from 1995 to 1998. He and Arthur Marriott were the two first practising solicitors ever to be appointed Queen's Counsel, on 27 March 1997.

As a solicitor-advocate, he appeared before the English Court of Appeal, the Judicial Committee of the House of Lords, and the European Court of Justice. He acted for the Government of Chile in the case to extradite General Pinochet.

== Judiciary ==
In 1997, he was appointed a deputy High Court judge, becoming a full-time judge in the Chancery Division on 28 September 2000, at which time he left Herbert Smith. He was the first solicitor to be appointed as a judge of the High Court direct from private practice, and only the second solicitor to be appointed, after Sir Michael Sachs in 1993, who had previously sat as a circuit judge for nine years. In a landmark case in 2006, he required file sharers who had refused to settle with the British Phonographic Industry to pay damages running into thousands of pounds.

His appointment as a Lord Justice of Appeal (judge of the Court of Appeal) was announced on 11 January 2007, and he was sworn to the Privy Council a month later. On 8 April 2009, it was announced that he would replace Lord Hoffmann as a Lord of Appeal in Ordinary. He is the first solicitor to be appointed to these senior levels of the judiciary. Accordingly, on 21 April 2009, he was created Baron Collins of Mapesbury, of Hampstead Town in the London Borough of Camden, and was introduced in the House of Lords on 28 April 2009. On 1 October 2009, he and nine other Lords of Appeal became Justices of the Supreme Court upon that body's inauguration.

He has been a fellow of Wolfson College, Cambridge, since 1975, became a fellow of the British Academy in 1994, and chair of laws at UCL Faculty of Laws since 2011. He is a member of the Institut de droit international. He has been the general editor of Dicey & Morris, the standard reference work on conflict of laws, since 1987, and it was retitled Dicey, Morris and Collins in its 14th edition, published in 2006. He is also the author of many other books and articles on private international law. He became a bencher of the Inner Temple in 2001. Collins was previously an adjunct professor of law at NYU School of Law.

Collins reached the compulsory retirement age of 70 on 7 May 2011 but stayed on as an acting justice until July. He retired from the House of Lords on 18 May 2026, having sat as both a crossbench and non-affiliated member.

=== Significant judgments ===
- HJ and HT v Home Secretary [2010] UKSC 31: homosexuality in asylum claims
- R v Bentley (Derek) [1999] posthumous overturning of unsafe murder conviction

== Family ==
He has one daughter, Hannah, and one son, Aaron.

== Notes ==
Legal offices
Preceded by None	Non-Permanent Judge of the Court of Final Appeal of Hong Kong; 2011–2024	Succeeded by None
