= Deputy President of the Supreme Court of the United Kingdom =

Deputy presiding officer of the Supreme Court of the United Kingdom

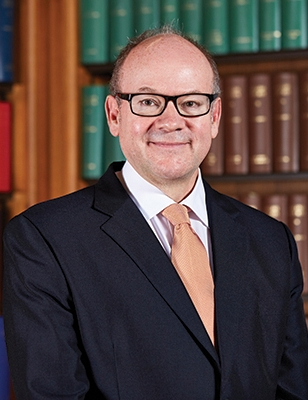
- Incumbent; Lord Sales since 12 January 2026
- Supreme Court of the United Kingdom
- Style: The Right Honourable (within the UK and the Commonwealth); My Lord/Lady (when addressed in court)
- Status: Deputy Chief Justice
- Seat: Middlesex Guildhall, London
- Appointer: The Monarch on the advice of the Prime Minister; following the Secretary of State for Justice's approval of a recommendation
- Term length: Life tenure; may be removed on the address of Parliament
- Constituting instrument: Constitutional Reform Act 2005
- Precursor: Second Senior Lord of Appeal in Ordinary
- Formation: 1 October 2009
- First holder: The Lord Hope of Craighead
- Salary: £206,857
- Website: www.supremecourt.uk

The deputy president of the Supreme Court of the United Kingdom is the second most senior judge of the Supreme Court of the United Kingdom, after the president of the Supreme Court. The office is equivalent to the now-defunct position of second senior lord of appeal in ordinary, also known previously as the second senior law lord, who was the second highest-ranking lord of appeal in ordinary.

By Royal Warrant of Queen Elizabeth II published on 1 October 2009, a place for the deputy president of the Supreme Court in the order of precedence was established: the deputy president of the Supreme Court ranks after the master of the rolls and before the other justices of the Supreme Court.

== List of second senior lords of appeal in ordinary ==
- Robert Goff, Baron Goff of Chieveley (1994–1996)
- Gordon Slynn, Baron Slynn of Hadley (2000–2002)
- Donald Nicholls, Baron Nicholls of Birkenhead (2002–2007)
- Lennie Hoffmann, Baron Hoffmann (2007–2009)
- David Hope, Baron Hope of Craighead (20 April 2009 – 1 October 2009)

== List of deputy presidents of the Supreme Court ==
| No. | Image | Name | Deputy presidency started | Deputy presidency ended | Tenure length | Alma mater | Reason for deputy presidency end |
|---|---|---|---|---|---|---|---|
| 1 | | David Hope, Baron Hope of Craighead | 1 October 2009 | 26 June 2013 | 3 years and 269 days | University of Cambridge University of Edinburgh | Retired |
| 2 | | Brenda Hale, Baroness Hale of Richmond | 28 June 2013 | 4 September 2017 | 4 years and 69 days | University of Cambridge | Appointed President |
| 3 | | Jonathan Mance, Baron Mance | 26 September 2017 | 6 June 2018 | 254 days | University of Oxford | Retired |
| 4 | | Robert Reed, Lord Reed | 7 June 2018 | 13 January 2020 | 1 year and 221 days | University of Edinburgh University of Oxford | Appointed President |
| 5 | | Patrick Hodge, Lord Hodge | 27 January 2020 | 31 December 2025 | 5 years and 338 days | University of Cambridge University of Edinburgh | Retired |
| 6 | | Philip Sales, Lord Sales | 12 January 2026 | incumbent | 308 days | University of Cambridge University of Oxford | — |
