= Philip Sales, Lord Sales =

British judge (born 1962)

The Right Honourable Lord Sales
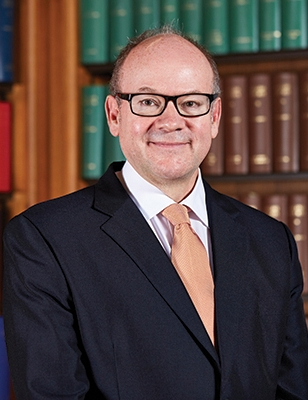

Deputy President of the Supreme Court of the United Kingdom
- Incumbent
- Assumed office 12 January 2026
- Nominated by: David Lammy
- Appointed by: Charles III
- Preceded by: Lord Hodge

Justice of the Supreme Court of the United Kingdom
- In office 11 January 2019 – 11 January 2026
- Nominated by: David Gauke
- Appointed by: Elizabeth II
- Preceded by: Lord Sumption

Lord Justice of Appeal
- In office 2014–2019

Personal details
- Born: 11 February 1962 (age 64)
- Education: Churchill College, Cambridge; Worcester College, Oxford

Philip James Sales, Lord Sales, PC (born 11 February 1962) is an English judge who has served as the Deputy President of the Supreme Court of the United Kingdom since January 2026.

== Early life ==
He was educated at the Royal Grammar School, Guildford, Churchill College, Cambridge (BA, 1983), and Worcester College, Oxford (BCL, 1984).

== Career ==
He was called to the bar at Lincoln's Inn in 1985. In 1997, he was appointed First Junior Treasury Counsel ("Treasury Devil"), a private practitioner barrister who represents the UK government in the civil courts. This caused "consternation" among senior lawyers, according to The Times, due to his young age.

Sales was a practising barrister at 11 King's Bench Walk (11KBW). At the time of the appointment, there was debate over Sales' appointment. According to The Guardian, an anonymous source referred to 11KBW as a "network of old boys and cronies", and that there was "no coincidence that the appointment came from Lord Irvine's and Tony Blair's old chambers". Acting as a barrister Sales defended the New Labour government's decision against holding a public inquiry into the Iraq War in the High Court in 2005.

=== Judicial appointment ===
He was made a QC in 2006, deputy judge of the High Court from 2004 to 2008, and judge of the High Court of Justice (Chancery Division) since 2008. He was a Lord Justice of Appeal from July 2014.

In 2016, Sales, as a member of the Court of Appeal ruled on 12 August 2016 that 130,000 Labour members who joined the party after 12 January 2016 would not be able to vote in the leadership contest, which over-ruled the previous High Court decision to allow the 130,000 disenfranchised Labour Party members to vote in the 2016 Labour Party leadership election.

In October 2016 Sales was one of the three judges forming the divisional court of the High Court in proceedings concerning the use of the royal prerogative for the issue of notification in accordance with Article 50 of the Treaty on European Union, R (Miller) v Secretary of State for Exiting the European Union. His role in this judgment meant that he appeared in an infamous front-cover of the Daily Mail, "Enemies of the People".

=== Supreme Court ===
Lord Justice Sales was appointed as a Justice of the Supreme Court of the United Kingdom on 11 January 2019, taking the judicial courtesy title of Lord Sales. He was appointed Deputy President on 12 January 2026.

== Personal life ==
Sales married Miranda Wolpert in 1988; they have a son and a daughter.

== Arms ==
Coat of arms of Philip Sales, Lord Sales
Crest Statant upon a balance Sable the pans Or an owl guardant also Or beaked and legged Gules holding in the dexter foot a sprig of oak Vert fructed Or. Escutcheon Per chevron Or and Azure in chief two stacks of three closed books Argent bound Azure garnished and in base three bees one and two volant Or. Motto Semper Perstat Sales
