= List of judgments of the Supreme Court of the United Kingdom delivered in 2011 =

This is a list of the judgments given by the Supreme Court of the United Kingdom in the year 2011. They are ordered by Neutral citation.

The table lists judgments made by the court and the opinions of the judges in each case. Judges are treated as having concurred in another's judgment when they either formally attach themselves to the judgment of another or speak only to acknowledge their concurrence with one or more judges. Any judgment which reaches a conclusion which differs from the majority on one or more major points of the appeal has been treated as dissent.

Because every judge in the court is entitled to hand down a judgment, it is not uncommon for 'factions' to be formed who reach the same conclusion in different ways, or for all members of the court to reach the same conclusion in different ways. The table does not reflect this.

== 2011 case summaries ==
Unless otherwise noted, cases were heard by a panel of 5 judges.

Cases involving Scots law are highlighted in orange. Cases involving Northern Irish law are highlighted in green.

Case name	Citation	Date	Legal subject	Summary of decision
R (Coke-Wallis) v Institute of Chartered Accountants	[2011] UKSC 1	19 January 2011	Labour law	
Morge v Hampshire County Council	[2011] UKSC 2	19 January 2011	Planning law	
Yemshaw v Hounslow	[2011] UKSC 3	26 January 2011	Homelessness; Domestic violence	
ZH (Tanzania) v Home Secretary	[2011] UKSC 4	1 February 2011	Children law; Immigration law	
GPS Inc. v Syarikat Takaful Malaysia Berhad	[2011] UKSC 5	1 February 2011	Maritime law	
Manchester CC v Pinnock (No 2)	[2011] UKSC 6	9 February 2011	Article 8, ECHR; Landlord-tenant law	
Brent LBC v Risk Management Partners	[2011] UKSC 7	9 February 2011	Public procurement	
Hounslow LBC v Powell	[2011] UKSC 8	23 February 2011	Article 8, ECHR; Homelessness	
R v Forsyth	[2011] UKSC 9	23 February 2011	Criminal law; International law	
Sienkiewicz v Greif	[2011] UKSC 10	9 March 2011	Negligence	
Patmalniece v Secretary for Work and Pensions	[2011] UKSC 11	16 March 2011	Free movement of workers	
WL (Congo) v Home Secretary	[2011] UKSC 12	23 March 2011	False imprisonment	
Jones v Kaney	[2011] UKSC 13	30 March 2011	Expert witnesses	
Duncombe v Schools Secretary	[2011] UKSC 14	30 March 2011	Labour law	
Communities Secretary v Welwyn Hatfield BC	[2011] UKSC 15	6 April 2011	Planning law	
Farstad Supply v Enviroco	[2011] UKSC 16	6 April 2011	Company law	
Baker v Quantum Clothing Group	[2011] UKSC 17	13 April 2011	Negligence	
R (Adams) v Justice Secretary	[2011] UKSC 18	11 May 2011	Miscarriage of justice	
HMRC v Tower MCashback	[2011] UKSC 19	11 May 2011	Tax law	
McCaughey's Application for Judicial Review	[2011] UKSC 20	18 May 2011	Judicial review	
R (GC) v Commissioner of Police of the Metropolis	[2011] UKSC 21	18 May 2011	DNA evidence, Article 8 ECHR	
FA (Iraq) v Home Secretary	[2011] UKSC 22	25 May 2011	EU law	
SK(Zimbabwe) v Home Secretary	[2011] UKSC 23	25 May 2011	Immigration law	
Fraser v Her Majesty's Advocate	[2011] UKSC 24	25 May 2011	Scots criminal law; Evidence	
Bloomsbury v Sea Fish Industry Authority	[2011] UKSC 25	15 June 2011	Fisheries Act 1981; Free movement of goods	
Parkwood Leisure v Alemo-Herron	[2011] UKSC 26	15 June 2011	TUPE	
Re. E (Children)	[2011] UKSC 27	10 June 2011	Family law	
R (Cart) v The Upper Tribunal	[2011] UKSC 28	22 June 2011	Judicial review	
Eba v Advocate General for Scotland	[2011] UKSC 29	22 June 2011	Judicial review	
R (G) v The Governors of X School	[2011] UKSC 30	29 June 2011	Article 6, ECHR	
NML Capital Ltd v Republic of Argentina	[2011] UKSC 31	6 July 2011	State immunity	
Scottish Widows plc v Commissioners for Her Majesty's Revenue and Customs	[2011] UKSC 32	6 July 2011	Company law	
R (McDonald) v Royal Borough of Kensington and Chelsea	[2011] UKSC 33	6 July 2011	Assisted living	
Al Rawi v The Security Service	[2011] UKSC 34	13 July 2011	Secret trial	
Home Office v Tariq	[2011] UKSC 35	13 July 2011	Secret trial	
Duncombe v Secretary of State for Children, Schools and Families (no. 2)	[2011] UKSC 36	15 July 2011	Labour law	
R v Smith	[2011] UKSC 37	20 July 2011	Criminal law	
Belmont Park Investments PTY Ltd v BNY Corporate Trustee Services Ltd and Lehman Brothers Special Financing Inc	[2011] UKSC 38	27 July 2011	Insolvency law	
Lucasfilm Ltd v Ainsworth	[2011] UKSC 39	27 July 2011	Intellectual property	
Jivraj v Hashwani	[2011] UKSC 40	27 July 2011	Discrimination in employment	
Autoclenz Ltd v Belcher	[2011] UKSC 41	27 July 2011	Labour law	
Houldsworth v Bridge Trustees Ltd and Secretary of State for Work and Pensions	[2011] UKSC 42	27 July 2011	Pensions law	
HM Advocate v Ambrose & Ors	[2011] UKSC 43	6 October 2011	Right to counsel; Article 6, ECHR	
HM Advocate v P	[2011] UKSC 44	6 October 2011	Right to counsel; Article 6, ECHR	
R (Bibi) v Secretary of State for the Home Department	[2011] UKSC 45	12 October 2011	Immigration law; Article 8, ECHR	
AXA General Insurance Ltd v The Lord Advocate	[2011] UKSC 46	12 October 2011	Negligence	
R (Gaines-Cooper) v Commissioners for Her Majesty's Revenue and Customs	[2011] UKSC 47	19 October 2011	Tax law	
Re. Kaupthing Singer & Friedlander Ltd and Re the Insolvency Act 1986	[2011] UKSC 48	19 October 2011	Insolvency law	
Gale v Serious Organised Crime Agency	[2011] UKSC 49	26 October 2011	Criminal law	
Rainy Sky SA v Kookmin Bank	[2011] UKSC 50	2 November 2011	Contract law	
Human Genome Sciences Inc v Eli Lilly & Co.	[2011] UKSC 51	2 November 2011	Intellectual property	
Berrisford v Mexfield Housing Co-operative Ltd	[2011] UKSC 52	9 November 2011	Land law	
Jones v Kernott	[2011] UKSC 53	9 November 2011	Land law	
McGowan v B	[2011] UKSC 54	23 November 2011	Right to counsel; Article 6, ECHR	
Jude v HM Advocate	[2011] UKSC 55	23 November 2011	Right to counsel; Article 6, ECHR	
Aberdeen City Council v Stewart Milne Group Ltd	[2011] UKSC 56	7 December 2011	Land law	
Russell v Transocean International Resources Ltd	[2011] UKSC 57	7 December 2011	Working Time Regulations 1998	
Edwards v Chesterfield Royal Hospital NHS Foundation Trust	[2011] UKSC 58	14 December 2011	Labour law	
R v Gnango	[2011] UKSC 59	14 December 2011	Criminal law	
Secretary of State for Work and Pensions v Payne	[2011] UKSC 60	14 December 2011	Insolvency law	

== 2011 opinions ==
Delivered a judgment (majority)	Concurred in the judgment of another justice (majority)	Delivered a judgment (dissenting)	Concurred in the judgment of another justice (dissent)	Did not participate in the decision

Case name	Citation	Argued	Decided	Phillips of Worth Matravers	Hope of Craighead	Saville of Newdigate	Rodger of Earlsferry	Walker of Gestingthorpe	Hale of Richmond	Brown of Eaton-under-Heywood	Mance	Collins of Mapesbury	Kerr of Tonaghmore	Clarke of Stone-cum-Ebony	Dyson	Judge	Wilson of Culworth
R (Coke-Wallis) v Institute of Chartered Accountants	[2011] UKSC 1	8–9 November 2010	19 January
Morge v Hampshire County Council	[2011] UKSC 2	8 November 2010	19 January
Yemshaw v Hounslow	[2011] UKSC 3	2 December 2010	26 January
ZH (Tanzania) v Home Secretary	[2011] UKSC 4	9–10 November 2010	1 February
GPS Inc. v Syarikat Takaful Malaysia Berhad	[2009] UKSC 5	28–29 July 2010	1 February
Manchester CC v Pinnock (Note: This case was simply a clarification of details of an order made in the previous judgement at [2010] UKSC 45.)	[2011] UKSC 6	5–8 July 2010	9 February
Brent LBC v Risk Management Partners	[2011] UKSC 7	8–9,13 December 2010	9 February
Hounslow LBC v Powell (Note: An augmented panel of 7 judges sat in this case.)	[2011] UKSC 8	23–24 November 2010	23 February
R v Forsyth	[2011] UKSC 9	6 December 2010	23 February
Sienkiewicz v Greif	[2011] UKSC 10	26–28 October 2010	9 March
Patmalniece v Secretary for Work and Pensions	[2011] UKSC 11	29–30 November, 1 December 2010	16 March
WL (Congo) v Home Secretary (Note: An augmented panel of 9 judges sat in this case.)	[2011] UKSC 12	15–18 November 2010	23 March
Jones v Kaney	[2011] UKSC 13	11–12 January	30 March
Duncombe v Schools Secretary	[2011] UKSC 14	17–18 January	30 March
Communities Secretary v Welwyn Hatfield BC	[2011] UKSC 15	7–8 February	6 April
Farstad Supply v Enviroco	[2011] UKSC 16	19–20 January	6 April
Baker v Quantum Clothing Group	[2011] UKSC 17	22–24 November 2010	13 April
R (Adams) v Justice Secretary	[2011] UKSC 18	15–17 February	11 May
HMRC v Tower MCashback	[2011] UKSC 19	21–22 February	11 May
McCaughey's Application for Judicial Review	[2011] UKSC 20	2–3 February	18 May
R (GC) v Commissioner of Police of the Metropolis	[2011] UKSC 21	31 January – 1 February	18 May
FA (Iraq) v Secretary of State for the Home Department	[2011] UKSC 22	23, 24 February	25 May
Shepherd Masimba Kambadzi v Secretary of State for the Home Department	[2011] UKSC 23	10, 11 February	25 May
Fraser v HM Advocate	[2011] UKSC 24	21, 22 March	25 May
Bloomsbury v Sea Fish Industry Authority	[2011] UKSC 25	23, 24 March	15 June
Parkwood Leisure v Alemo-Herron	[2011] UKSC 26	13, 14 April	15 June
Re. E (Children)	[2011] UKSC 27	23, 24 May	10 June
R (on the application of Cart) v The Upper Tribunal	[2011] UKSC 28	14–17 March	22 June
Eba v Advocate General for Scotland	[2011] UKSC 29	14–17 March	22 June
R (on the application of G) v The Governors of X School	[2011] UKSC 30	11, 12 April	29 June
NML Capital Ltd v Republic of Argentina	[2011] UKSC 31	29, 30 March	6 July
Scottish Widows plc v Commissioners for Her Majesty's Revenue and Customs (Note: The Master of the Rolls, Lord Neuberger of Abbotsbury, also sat in on this case and gave a judgment that formed the unanimous majority.)	[2011] UKSC 32	16, 17 May	6 July
R (on the application of McDonald) v Royal Borough of Kensington and Chelsea	[2011] UKSC 33	4, 5 April	6 July
Al Rawi v The Security Service (Note: Lord Rodger died before judgment was given in this case. He indicated that he would join the majority.)	[2011] UKSC 34	24, 25 January	13 July
Home Office v Tariq	[2011] UKSC 35	26, 27 January	13 July
Duncombe v Secretary of State for Children, Schools and Families (no. 2)	[2011] UKSC 36	17, 18 January	15 July
R v Smith (2011)	[2011] UKSC 37	16 June	20 July
Belmont Park Investments PTY Ltd v BNY Corporate Trustee Services Ltd and Lehman Brothers Special Financing Inc	[2011] UKSC 38	1–3 March	27 July
Lucasfilm Ltd v Ainsworth	[2011] UKSC 39	7–9 March	27 July
Jivraj v Hashwani	[2011] UKSC 40	6, 7 April	27 July
Autoclenz Ltd v Belcher	[2011] UKSC 41	11, 12 May	27 July
Houldsworth v Bridge Trustees Ltd and Secretary of State for Work and Pensions	[2011] UKSC 42	20, 21 June	27 July
HM Advocate v Ambrose (Note: Lord Clarke also gave judgment in this case. He agreed with the lead judgment handed down by Lord Hope of Craighead.)	[2011] UKSC 43	28–30 June	6 October
HM Advocate v P	[2011] UKSC 44	28–30 June	6 October
R (on the application of Bibi) v Secretary of State for the Home Department	[2011] UKSC 45	8, 9 June	12 October
AXA General Insurance Ltd v The Lord Advocate (Note: Lord Reed also gave judgment in this case. He delivered the lead judgment alongside Lord Hope of Craighead.)	[2011] UKSC 46	13–15 June	12 October
R (on the application of Gaines-Cooper) v Commissioners for Her Majesty's Revenue and Customs	[2011] UKSC 47	6, 7 July	19 October
Rainy Sky SA v Kookmin Bank	[2011] UKSC 50	27 July	2 November
Human Genome Sciences Inc v Eli Lilly & Co.	[2011] UKSC 51	18–20 July	2 November
Berrisford v Mexfield Housing Co-operative Ltd	[2011] UKSC 52	5, 6 October	9 November
Jones v Kernott	[2011] UKSC 53	4 May	9 November
McGowan v B (Note: Lord Hamilton also sat in on this case. He concurred with the lead judgment of Lord Hope of Craighead.)	[2011] UKSC 54	11, 12 October	23 November
Jude v HM Advocate	[2011] UKSC 55	11, 12 October	23 November
Aberdeen City Council v Stewart Milne Group Ltd	[2011] UKSC 56	10 November	7 December
Russell and others v Transocean International Resources Ltd	[2011] UKSC 57	26, 27 October	7 December
Edwards v Chesterfield Royal Hospital NHS Foundation Trust	[2011] UKSC 58	22, 23 June	14 December
R v Gnango	[2011] UKSC 59	11, 12 July	14 December
Secretary of State for Work and Pensions v Payne	[2011] UKSC 60	3 November	14 December

== Judges ==
- Lord Saville of Newdigate announced his retirement in 2010. His appearance in Baker v Quantum Clothing Group was his last appearance as a Supreme Court justice.
- Lord Rodger of Earlsferry died on 26 June 2011.
- Lord Collins of Mapesbury retired in May 2011 but continued as an acting justice until the end of July.
- Lord Wilson of Culworth became a justice on 26 May 2011.
- Lord Neuberger of Abbotsbury was the Master of the Rolls and was not a full member of the Supreme Court, although was entitled to sit at the court's invitation.
- The other members of the court are listed in order of seniority. Lord Phillips of Worth Matravers and Lord Hope of Craighead were, respectively, the President and Deputy President of the Supreme Court.
