= Jones v Kaney =

2011 UK Supreme Court judgment

- Court: Supreme Court of the United Kingdom
- Full case name: Paul Wynne Jones v Sue Kaney
- Argued: 11–12 January 2011
- Decided: 30 March 2011
- Neutral citation: [2011] UKSC 13

Case history
- Prior history: High Court (Blake J) [2010] EWHC 61 (QB)

Holding
- Expert witnesses are not immune from being sued in tort or contract for their participation in legal proceedings (5:2 majority)

Case opinions
- Majority: Lord Phillips (President); Lord Brown; Lord Collins; Lord Kerr; and Lord Dyson
- Dissent: Lord Hope (Deputy President) and Lady Hale;

Area of law
- Professional negligence; expert witness immunity from suit

Jones v Kaney [2011] UKSC 13 is a 2011 decision of the Supreme Court of the United Kingdom on whether expert witnesses retained by a party in litigation can be sued for professional negligence in England and Wales, or whether they have the benefit of immunity from suit. The case involved a psychologist (Kaney) instructed as an expert witness in a personal injury claim, who was said to have negligently signed a statement of matters agreed with the expert instructed by the opposing side, in which she made a number of concessions that weakened the claim considerably. As a result, according to the injured claimant (Jones), he had to settle the claim for much less than he would have obtained had his expert not been careless. To succeed in the claim, he had to overturn an earlier Court of Appeal decision that had decided that preparation of a joint statement with the other side's expert was covered by immunity from suit. Kaney therefore succeeded in getting the claim struck out before trial on an application heard by Mr Justice Blake in the High Court of Justice. The judge issued a certificate allowing the claimant to "leapfrog" the Court of Appeal and go straight to the Supreme Court to appeal against his decision.

The Supreme Court, by a majority of five to two, decided that expert witnesses were not immune in the law of England and Wales from claims in tort or contract for matters connected with their participation in legal proceedings. This reversed a line of authority dating back 400 years. The case considered the narrow issue, namely whether preparation of a joint statement by experts was immune from suit, and the wider public policy issue of whether litigants should be able to sue experts that they had instructed for breach of duty. There was discussion about whether removing the immunity would have a "chilling effect" on the willingness of experts to participate in court proceedings, although judges on both sides of the decision agreed that there was no empirical evidence on the point. Lord Phillips, a member of the majority, compared the situation of expert witnesses with that of advocates, on the basis that both owed duties to clients and to the court. Advocates' immunity from claims in negligence had been removed in 2001 in Hall v Simons. The change, he said, had not led to an increase in vexatious claims or a reduction in the performance of duties owed by advocates to the court. Lord Hope, in the minority, said that experts and advocates had different functions and so disagreed with the comparison. He also pointed out that English law would now be different from Scots law on this issue.

The judgment has been called a "landmark ruling" by the Law Society Gazette, with lawyers saying that the decision was expected but long overdue. One barrister, Clare Montgomery QC, looked at the implications for other participants in the legal process, commenting that the "process of whittling away the scope of the immunity" that they have "appears to be far from over". Other commentators were concerned that the decision would lead to reduction in the number of expert witnesses prepared to become involved with some particularly sensitive areas, such as child abuse cases. Lady Hale, the other dissenting judge, said that changing the law in this way was "irresponsible" and said that the position should instead be considered by the Law Commission and Parliament.

== Background ==
In 2001, the claimant (Paul Jones) was involved in a road traffic accident and later brought a claim for damages for physical and psychiatric injury. His solicitors instructed the defendant, Dr Sue Kaney (a consultant clinical psychologist), in 2003 to advise and report on the claim. She expressed her initial view was that he was suffering from post traumatic stress disorder (PTSD). However, the view taken by the psychiatrist instructed by the insurers defending the claim was that Jones was exaggerating the effects of his physical injuries, either consciously or unconsciously. The two experts held a discussion in November 2005 to see what if any agreement they could reach. The joint statement signed by both experts after the discussion showed that Kaney had conceded ground on a number of issues, weakening the claim considerably. She agreed that the claimant's psychological reaction was only an adjustment reaction, not PTSD, and she further stated that Jones had been "very deceptive and deceitful in his reporting", suggesting that he might be consciously giving incorrect information to the experts.

Jones's solicitors asked why she had changed her views so completely. According to the allegations made in the subsequent claim for damages against her, she had felt under pressure to agree the wording of the document although it did not represent what she had agreed during the discussion and did not represent her true view, which was that Jones had had PTSD and had only been evasive not deceptive. The personal injury claim was subsequently settled without a trial.

In 2009, Jones brought a claim for damages for professional negligence against Kaney, on the basis that the personal injury claim had had to be settled for considerably less than would have been the case had Kaney not signed a document that apparently did not reflect her views. Kaney applied to strike out the claim before filing a defence, on the basis that the claim could not possibly succeed given the binding authority of the Court of Appeal decision of Stanton v Callaghan in 1998 that expert witnesses could not be sued for negligence when preparing a joint statement with the opposing side's expert witness.

The application succeeded before Mr Justice Blake, sitting in the High Court. He granted a certificate under section 12 of the Administration of Justice Act 1969, allowing the claimant to "leapfrog" the Court of Appeal and proceed directly to the Supreme Court, who (unlike the Court of Appeal) would have power to overrule the decision in Stanton if it was wrong. He took the view that there was a "substantial likelihood" that Stanton would be overturned by the Supreme Court, on the basis that "a policy of blanket immunity for all witnesses, indiscriminately protecting witnesses as to fact and witnesses on the opposing side from expert witnesses retained by a party to advise them before and during the proceedings as to a pertinent issue in those proceedings, may well prove to be too broad to be sustainable and therefore disproportionate."

== Judgment ==
The appeal was heard by seven of the Justices of the Supreme Court: Lord Phillips, the President of the Court; Lord Hope, the Deputy President; Lady Hale; Lord Brown; Lord Collins; Lord Kerr; and Lord Dyson. The decision to allow Jones's appeal against the strike-out order was reached by a majority of five to two, with Lord Hope and Lady Hale dissenting. The Supreme Court normally sits with a panel of five Justices, but may sit with more when the case is of "great public importance".

=== Majority views ===
Lord Phillips said that the appeal raised the "narrow issue" of whether "the act of preparing a joint witness statement is one in respect of which an expert witness enjoys immunity from suit", and the broader issue of whether "public policy justifies conferring on an expert witness any immunity from liability in negligence in relation to the performance of his duties in that capacity." He said that it was surprising that the immunity had simply been accepted in the past and never challenged. He noted that the immunity dated back to Cutler v Dixon in 1585, over 400 years ago, before English tort law developed the modern law of negligence. It was originally a complete protection for witnesses against claims for defamation, before developing to cover protection from other tort claims. He noted that it was difficult to draw the line at present between expert assistance that was immune from claim and that which was not: it might be that the earlier advice was negligent, not the evidence given in court resiling from that earlier advice, even if it was the later developments about which the client complained.

He said that there were three justifications for the immunity given in the caselaw and in argument. Firstly, there was the "chilling effect" of such claims, making witnesses reluctant to give frank evidence or to provide expert evidence at all; secondly, the risk that an expert witness would be reluctant to comply with his paramount duty to the court if to do so involved giving evidence contrary to his client's interest with a risk of being sued for doing so. Thirdly, it was "undesirable" that a court hearing a claim for negligence against an expert witness should have to decide whether the court that decided the claim in which the expert gave evidence reached the correct decision. This argument was not at the forefront of the defendant's arguments, but was one that Lord Phillips said should not be wholly discounted. He noted that a claim based on an alleged wrongful conviction as the result of an expert's negligence would be struck out as an abuse of process unless the conviction had been overturned, under the rule in Hunter v Chief Constable of the West Midlands Police.

Lord Phillips noted that expert witnesses (unlike witnesses giving evidence of facts) had volunteered to give evidence and were doing so for payment. He saw "no justification" for the assumption that experts would be discouraged from providing their services if they could be sued. As for the effect on an expert's willingness to give frank evidence, there was no empirical evidence either way, he said. However, a witness of integrity would concede a change of view where necessary to do so and ought not to be concerned about being sued.

He noted that Lord Hoffmann in Hall v Simons (2001) had said that a witness owed no duty of care in respect of his evidence, only a duty to tell the truth, but he considered that to be incorrect, since it failed to distinguish between witnesses of fact and experts. The expert would have a contract with the client in which he agreed to perform the duties that he owed to the court, and so there was no conflict between the two duties. In this respect, expert witnesses were more like advocates, who owed duties to client and court, than to witnesses of fact. He noted that barristers had long been immune from negligence claims until the decision of the House of Lords in Hall v Simons. Removing their immunity, he said, had not led to any diminution in advocates performing their duty to the court, and it would be "mere conjecture" to assume that this would be any different for expert witnesses. Neither had vexatious claims been a problem for barristers – in any event, the present case was not vexatious and there were other hurdles, both procedural and financial, in the way of an unsuccessful litigant making unmeritorious claims against an expert. As there was no justification for continuing to hold that expert witnesses were "immune from suit in relation to the evidence they give in court or for the views they express in anticipation of court proceedings", he concluded that the immunity for claims for breach of duty (but not defamation) should be abolished.

Lord Brown concurred. He said that "the gains to be derived from denying [expert witnesses] immunity from suit for breach of that duty substantially exceed whatever loss might be thought likely to result from this", since a potential liability would lead to a "sharpened awareness of the risks of pitching their initial views of the merits of their client’s case too high or too inflexibly lest these views come to expose and embarrass them at a later date." He thought that this was a "healthy development". It would also ensure that a client who was caused loss by an expert witness acting in "an egregious manner" would receive a proper remedy; he said that such cases were likely to be "highly exceptional". Lord Collins, agreeing, noted that the result did not affect the position of the expert vis-a-vis the opposing litigant, where there were "wider considerations of policy" against allowing claims. He also remarked that the existing ability to prosecute expert witnesses for perjury or to take disciplinary proceedings against them for unprofessional conduct in preparing or presenting their evidence did not fit with the claim that a liability to their clients for breach of duty would have a chilling effect on experts' willingness to give evidence. Lord Kerr, who also agreed with the decision, said that if "an expert expresses an honestly held view, even if it differs from that which he may have originally expressed, provided it is an opinion which is tenable, he has nothing to fear from a disgruntled party."

=== Minority views ===
Lord Hope said that there was "a formidable body of authority which should not be lightly disregarded" in favour of the immunity. He emphasised that the rule was not there to protect the incompetent expert witness, but ensure that witnesses were not deterred from coming forward and giving evidence without facing allegations afterwards in attempt to obtain damages from them. He was concerned by the lack of evidence either way as to whether an exception to the rule in Watson was needed or the consequences of introducing such an exception, particularly as the effect of the decision of the majority was to remove the immunity with retrospective effect, and there was "no way back" from this without legislation. The "need for certainty" made it necessary to extend the rule to all witnesses, in his view, even though some genuine claims may be barred as a result. He was particularly concerned that an "incautious" removal of the immunity from experts "risks destabilising the protection that is given to witnesses generally", adding that the approach of Lord Phillips contained "seeds... for challenging the whole concept of witness immunity."

Lord Hope disagreed with the principles and analogies relied upon by the majority. Of the principle that "where there is a wrong there must be a remedy", he said that the policy decision to protect witnesses from litigation had been taken some time ago, without anything being said to cast doubt on the policy choice. He also asked how the rule could be altered to allow negligence claims but not defamation claims, since if there was a well-founded defamation claim barred by witness immunity then a wrong would have been done without remedy in that instance. He said that advocates and experts performed different functions and so it could not be assumed that the fact that advocates' immunity had been removed without difficulty would mean that immunity could be removed from experts without any problems. He was more impressed with the difficulties about where to draw the line if the claim was allowed to proceed than the argument that there would be a "chilling effect" on the availability of witnesses, wondering what the impact would be for experts involved in criminal proceedings or family cases involving children. He wondered whether a company director, owing a duty of care to the company, would face removal of the immunity if making an "inexcusable error" when giving evidence on the company's behalf. Overall, he considered that the matter was best left to Parliament and the Law Commission. He furthermore noted that the decision in Watson remained binding in Scots law, in preference to the decision in Jones (since Jones only concerned the law of England and Wales), adding that the issue ought also to be considered by the Scottish Law Commission.

Lady Hale was also concerned about the ramifications of the decision. She asked if a doctor treating a patient after an accident and giving evidence about what happened as well as his opinions as to what would happen would be covered or not, or whether only in part. She noted that the ruling in the case would have to apply to experts dealing with cases before tribunals as well as courts, thus including claims for unfair dismissal before employment tribunals and disputes between landlord and tenants about service charges and rent assessments. She queried whether it ought to extend to psychiatrists assessing patients for tribunal proceedings under the Mental Health Act 1983, or educational psychologists giving evidence about children with special educational needs in tribunal proceedings about their future education. In her view, these are "sensitive and often highly fraught cases in which performing the expert's duty to the tribunal may well be perceived by the client patient or parent as a breach of her duty towards him." In family law cases, she said, there would now be some professional witnesses who had immunity from negligence claims for their evidence and others who did not, with some of the distinctions between the two groups appearing to be "arbitrary". She thought that the decision might make experts more likely to confirm their previous views rather than change them, and could lead to higher insurance premiums for experts, increased fees and the use of exemption clauses in contracts – "in which case we shall be back where we started", she said. Overall, she called the decision to change the law "irresponsible" and, like Lord Hope, considered that the topic was best left to Parliament and the Law Commission.

== Significance ==
The Supreme Court's conclusions were described by newspapers and legal magazines as "a landmark ruling", an "historic decision", and as a "major victory" for the lawyers acting for the claimant. The Lawyer magazine said that the ruling "professionalised the expert witness industry". In similar vein, one legal training consultant said that it "marked the end of the amateur expert", but that "only wimps will withdraw" from giving expert evidence. One of the lawyers involved in the case, Daniel Shapiro, predicted that it would lead to between five and ten claims against experts in the following year.

A solicitor working in the field of professional negligence claims, Ian McConkey, said to insurance magazine Post Online that the result had been "widely expected". McConkey urged the insurance industry to "take stock" of the decision and consider the terms on which cover was offered to experts. Another lawyer was quoted by the Law Society Gazette as saying the decision was long overdue, but unlikely to lead to experts becoming reluctant to take on claims, since they could limit their liability in their terms of engagement.

The barrister Clare Montgomery QC of Matrix Chambers considered the wider implications of the decision, wondering whether it might lead to claims against other participants in the legal process being allowed. She asked rhetorically if a police officer who owed a duty of care to an individual might now be liable when giving evidence or making a statement that was a breach of that duty. "The process of whittling away the scope of the immunity available to protect the participants in judicial processes appears to be far from over", she said. Penny Cooper, a professor at the City Law School in London, was concerned about a "lack of clarity" in the decision about who else apart from experts could be sued as a result, and commented that the witness box had now become "an even more scary place to be".

Some lawyers were concerned about the impact of the ruling on the willingness of experts to act, particularly in court cases involving allegations of child abuse. The chairman of the Expert Witness Institute, James Badenoch QC, told The Independent on Sunday that he was worried about experts being "frightened off" by the prospects of claims against them in such cases. Peter Garsden, a solicitor who is president of the Association of Child Abuse Lawyers, called the decision "horrifying", adding that he already found it difficult to find expert witnesses and the "fear of litigation" could have "a drastic effect" on his firm's work.

Writing in the New Law Journal, Chris Pamplin called the decision "unprincipled" and argued that the decision "threatens the very foundation of witness immunity", based on an out-of-date view of the expert witness as a "hired gun". Pamplin's view was that the majority had "ignored the fundamental difference" between experts and advocates, saying that advocates had no choice but to continue in the legal system whereas experts could continue their ordinary work without needing to carry on as an expert witness. Therefore, experts would be more likely to abandon such work than advocates, making them more vulnerable to vexatious litigation. However, he said it would make "little immediate difference" for many experts, since "conscientious professionals" would have little worry about being found negligent and would have insurance in case they were. The ruling would also help develop a "professional class of expert", making it less likely that people would contribute expertise occasionally, and although a professional expert witness would have a better knowledge of their role and duties, this would be at the expense of "freshness and challenge to dogma".

== See also ==
- 2011 Judgments of the Supreme Court of the United Kingdom

== Notes ==
=== Judgments ===
- Supreme Court decision: Jones v Kaney [2011] UKSC 13 (30 March 2011)
- High Court decision: Jones v Kaney [2010] EWHC 61 (QB) (21 January 2010)
