= R (GC) v Comr of Police of the Metropolis =

R (GC) v Commissioner of Police of the Metropolis
- Court: Supreme Court of the United Kingdom
- Full case name: R (on the application of GC) v The Commissioner of Police of the Metropolis, R (on the application of C) v Commissioner of Police of the Metropolis
- Argued: 31 January, 1 February 2011
- Decided: May 18, 2011
- Neutral citation: [2011] UKSC 21

Case history
- Prior history: [2010] EWHC 2225 (Admin)
- Related actions: S and Marper v United Kingdom (2009) 48 EHRR 50; R (S) v Chief Constable of South Yorkshire [2004] UKHL 39

Holding
- Appeal allowed By 5:2, Blanket retention of DNA evidence was unlawful under the Police and Criminal Evidence Act 1984 as read in conjunction with the Human Rights Act 1998. No specific remedy was granted, pending Parliamentary review of the legislation.

Case opinions
- Majority: Lords Phillips, Judge, Dyson, Kerr & Lady Hale
- Dissent: Lords Rodger & Brown

Area of law
- DNA evidence, Right to privacy

R (on the application of GC) v The Commissioner of Police of the Metropolis [2011] UKSC 21 was a 2011 judgment of the Supreme Court of the United Kingdom. The case concerned the extent of the police's power to indefinitely retain biometric data associated with individuals who are no longer suspected of a criminal offence. In the case, a majority of the Supreme Court, including the Court's President Lord Phillips and the Lord Chief Justice Lord Judge reversed an earlier ruling of the High Court of Justice and found that the police force's policy of retaining DNA evidence in the absence of 'exceptional circumstances' was unlawful and a violation of Article 8 of the European Convention on Human Rights. The court declined to offer any specific relief however, recognising that the policy is expected to be subject to legislative scrutiny as Part 1 of the Protection of Freedoms Bill 2011.

== Facts ==
The case concerned the applications of two individuals (who were granted anonymity) who had been suspected of criminal offences and subsequently been cleared. Both individuals had applied to the police force requesting the destruction of DNA and other biometric data which the police force had retained, the police refused both requests citing an ACPO guideline which permitted the destruction of biometric data only in 'exceptional circumstances'. Both individuals made an application to the High Court asking for judicial review of the police's decision. As the court was bound by a House of Lords precedent - R(S) v Chief Constable of South Yorkshire [2004] UKHL 39 - they refused the application, but gave permission for a leapfrog appeal to the Supreme Court.

== Judgment ==
In the Supreme Court, arguments were heard from the parties to the case and from intervening parties including Liberty, the Equality and Human Rights Commission and the Home Department on hearings on 31 January and 1 February 2011. The court returned judgments on 18 May 2011. Whilst the court was unanimous in overturning the decision in R(S) v Chief Constable of South Yorkshire and affirming the European Court of Human Rights' finding from S and Marper v United Kingdom (2009) 48 EHRR 50 that the police's blanket policy of retaining biometric data from persons who had either been acquitted of an offence, or against whom charges had been dropped was de facto incompatible with Article 8 of the European Convention on Human Rights, members of the court differed on their reasoning.

The majority, led by Lord Dyson felt that the APCO guideline which the police had relied on and which substantially restricted the discretion of police chiefs to destroy retained evidence was not compatible with Article 8. The majority read s64 Police and Criminal Evidence Act 1984 (PACE) in conjunction with provisions of the Human Rights Act 1998 and determined that the APCO guideline was not compatible with the primary legislation and thus unlawful. They therefore allowed the appeal, although they did not pass any order requiring the destruction of any data as it was acknowledged that the legislature is expected to pass an Act in the near future which will limit the police's ability to retain biometric data.

The minority, consisting of Lord Brown and Lord Rodger would have dismissed the appeals. Whilst they agreed in principle that the police policy was not compatible with article 8, they argued that the s64 PACE was itself not compatible with the convention, and that the police had 'no choice' but to retain the relevant data. As the judiciary of England and Wales has no power to review primary legislation such as this Act, they would have issued a declaration of incompatibility with regard to the provisions.
