= Fraser v HM Advocate =

2011 UK legal case

Fraser v Her Majesty's Advocate
- Court: Supreme Court
- Decided: 25 May 2011
- Citation: 2011 SLT 515, 2011 SCL 582, [2011] UKSC 24

Case history
- Prior actions: Fraser v. Her Majesty's Advocate [2009] ScotHC HCJAC 27 (Lord Gill JC, Lord Osborne and Lord Wheatley)
- Subsequent action: Re-trial of the appellant Fraser

Court membership
- Judges sitting: Lord Hope of Craighead (Deputy President), Lord Rodger of Earlsferry, Lord Brown of Eaton-under-Heywood, Lord Kerr of Tonaghmore and Lord Dyson

Case opinions
- Lord Hope of Craighead (Lord Rodger of Earlsferry, Lord Kerr of Tonaghmore and Lord Dyson concurring) and Lord Brown of Eaton-under-Heywood

Keywords
- Fairness, Disclosure Article 6 of ECHR, devolution issues

Fraser v Her Majesty's Advocate (2011) UKSC 24 is a decision of the Supreme Court of the United Kingdom relating to the effect of non-disclosure of evidence to the defence at trial and the role of the Supreme Court of the United Kingdom in Scots criminal law.

== Background and trial ==
On 29 January 2003, Nat Fraser was convicted by a majority verdict at the High Court at Edinburgh, before Lord Mackay of Drumadoon and a jury, of the murder of his wife Arlene. He was duly sentenced to life imprisonment with a punishment part of 25 years. His wife had disappeared in 1998 and he insisted that he was innocent of any involvement in her disappearance and presumed death. The cornerstone of the Crown's case against Fraser was that on 7 May he had returned certain rings from the dead body of his wife, 9 days after she vanished, in order to foster the appearance that she had decided to leave of her own volition. The trial judge directed the jury that they were obliged to acquit Fraser if they were unsure that he had returned the rings to the house.

== Initial appellate proceedings ==
Fraser lodged a note of appeal against conviction and sentence to the Court of Criminal Appeal. The appeal was heard by the Lord Justice Clerk (Lord Gill), Lord Osborne and Lord Johnston. It emerged that two police constables had given witness statements to the Crown before the trial to the effect that they had seen jewellery, including the rings, in the Fraser's house on 28 and 29 April. Fraser's two grounds of appeal were that the new evidence had a vital bearing on the jury's verdict, and that its non-disclosure to the defence had caused a miscarriage of justice. However, the court unanimously refused Fraser's appeal on the grounds, that notwithstanding the fresh evidence and the non-disclosure, the strength of the circumstantial evidence against Fraser was so strong that no miscarriage of justice had occurred.

== Appeal to the Supreme Court ==
Fraser applied to the High Court for leave to appeal to the Judicial Committee of the Privy Council on the grounds that his case involved a devolution issue, namely that his prosecution and conviction had infringed his rights under Article 6 of the European Convention on Human Rights. His application was refused as incompetent by the Appeal Court on 24 March 2009, on the grounds that the issues had already been determined in the earlier appeal proceedings and that Parliament had not intended, in the Scotland Act 1998, to allow the Privy Council to review the merits of decisions of the Appeal Court.

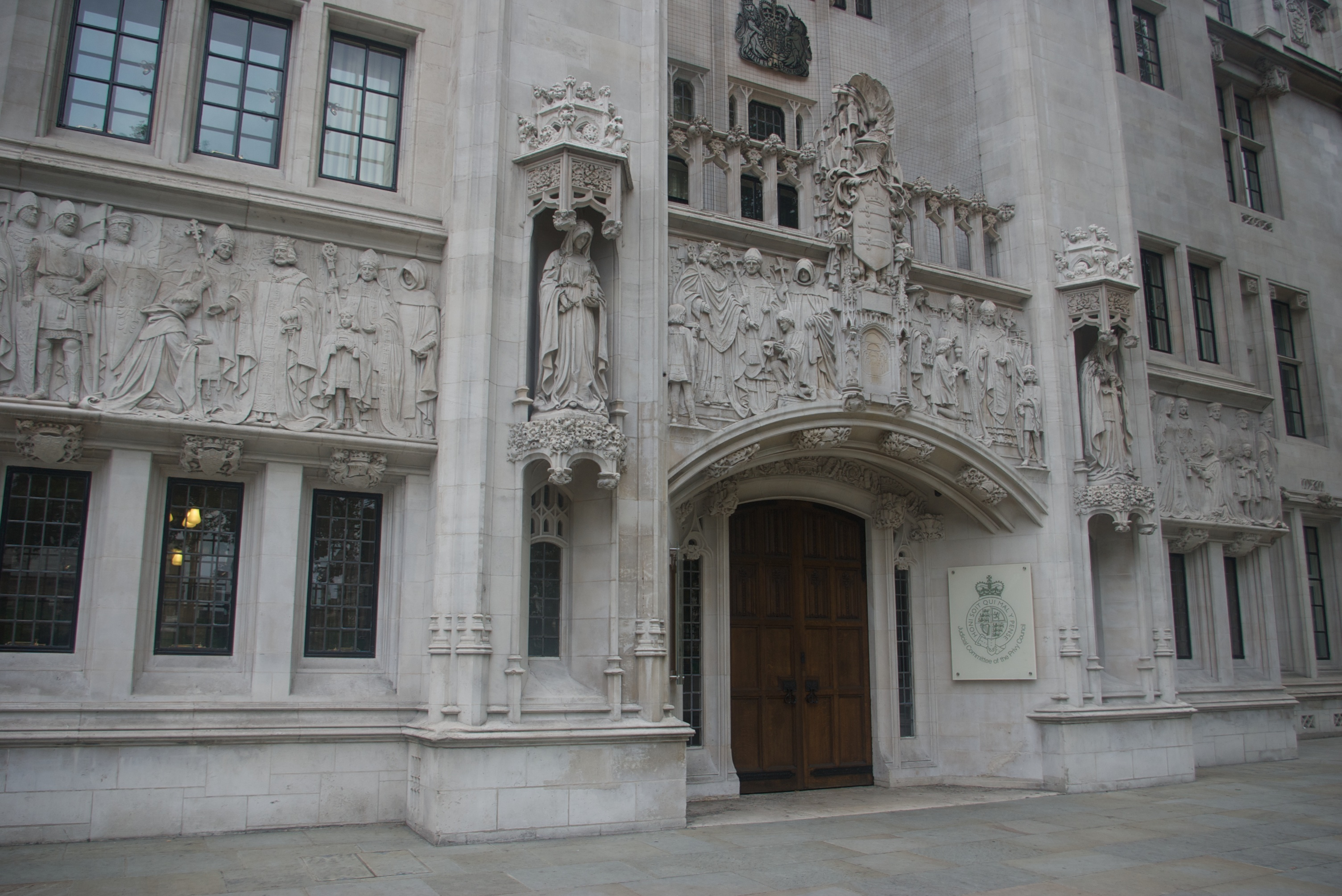
The Middlesex Guildhall, seat of the Supreme Court

Fraser then applied for special leave to appeal to the Privy Council directly. However, the determination of his application was delayed pending the resolution of two other Scottish cases, by which point the jurisdiction of the Privy Council to determine devolution issues under the Scotland Act 1998 had been transferred to the Supreme Court. On 20 May 2011, the Supreme Court granted his application for special leave to appeal.

Lord Hope of Craighead delivered the majority judgment. Reaffirming that the High Court remained the final court of appeal in criminal matters in Scotland and that the Supreme Court had no jurisdiction to review the merits of its decisions made in exercise of that function, he ruled that the Appeal Court had applied the wrong test in law in relation to article 6(1), namely, whether they believed that there had been a miscarriage of justice rather than whether there was 'a real possibility that the jury at this trial would have arrived at a different verdict' which created a miscarriage of justice, based on the precedent of McInnes v Her Majesty's Advocate. He concluded that a real possibility existed, and accordingly allowed the appeal, and remitted the matter to the Appeal Court with a direction to quash Fraser's conviction, once it had decided whether he should be re-tried, in exercise of the court's powers under paragraph 13 of Schedule 6 to the Scotland Act 1998.

Lord Brown of Eaton-under-Heywood agreed that the Appeal Court had applied the wrong test in law and would have allowed the appeal but was inclined to have remitted the whole case to the Appeal Court, absent a direction to quash. He did not, however, carry this view to dissent.

== Aftermath ==
=== Legal consequences ===
On 17 June 2011, in accordance with the order of the Supreme Court, the Appeal Court quashed Fraser's conviction and granted authority to bring a new prosecution. On 23 April 2012, Fraser's retrial began at the High Court at Edinburgh before Lord Bracadale and a jury. On 30 May 2012, Fraser was convicted of the murder of his wife, and was sentenced to life imprisonment with a punishment part of seventeen years.

=== Political consequences ===
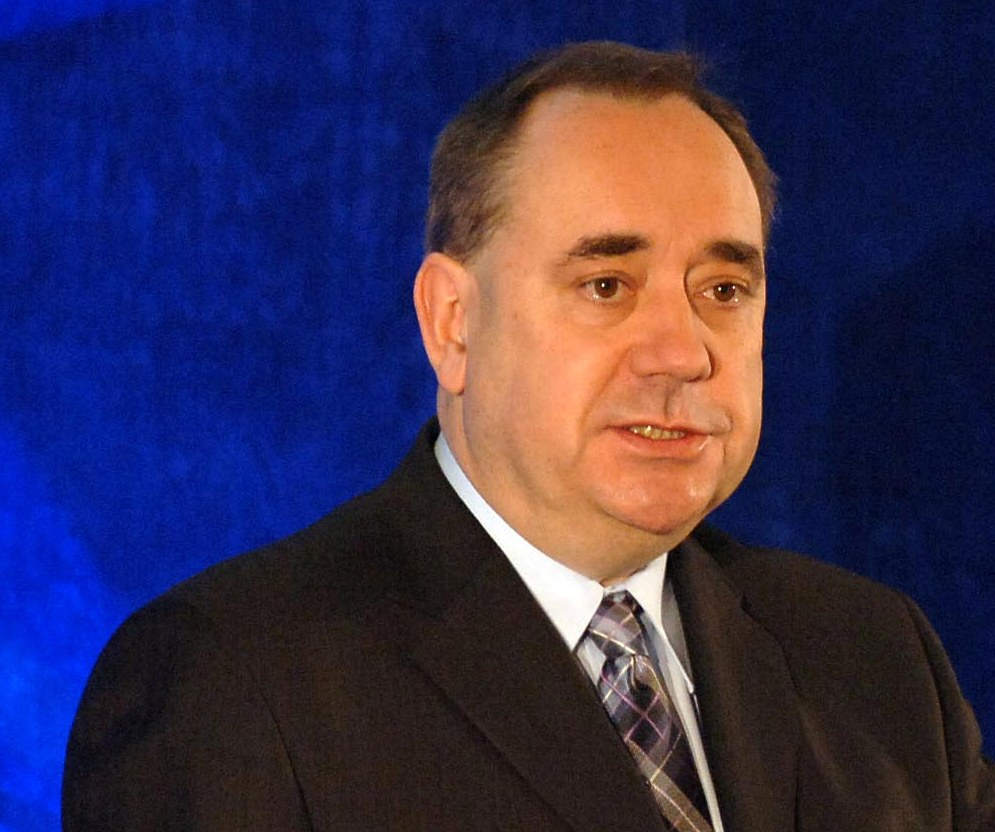
Alex Salmond was accused of "unbelievable ignorance"

The Supreme Court ruling was controversially attacked by Scottish Justice Secretary Kenny MacAskill MSP who threatened to withhold funding for the court on the grounds that it was undermining Scottish judicial independence. In addition, Scottish First Minister Alex Salmond MSP convened an expert group to limit the referral of Scottish cases to the court on human rights grounds.

Both men were accused of "unbelievable ignorance" by former Principal Advocate Depute at the Crown Office, Brian McConnachie and for "interfering in the independence of the judiciary and for making "highly personal" attacks on senior legal figures" by Richard Keen, dean of the Faculty of Advocates, and Cameron Ritchie, president of the Law Society of Scotland. Legal commentator Joshua Rozenberg claimed that Salmond had made an "extraordinary personal attack" against Deputy President Lord Hope of Craighead, as part of a Scottish nationalist agenda.

The Scotland Bill 2011 was amended, partially as a result of the decision in Fraser, to insert new section 98A into the Scotland Act 1998 which would create a statutory right of appeal to the Supreme Court from the Appeal Court in the case of an issue of compatibility with the Convention only.
