= R v Gnango =

British legal case

- Court: Supreme Court of the United Kingdom
- Full case name: Regina (appellant) v Armel Gnango (respondent)
- Decided: 14 December 2011
- Citations: [2011] UKSC 59, [2012] 2 WLR 17, [2012] 1 Cr App R 18

Case history
- Prior actions: R v Gnango [2010] EWCA Crim 1691 (26 July 2010) (Thomas, Hooper, Hughes & Gross LJJ and Hedley J)
- Appealed from: Court of Appeal (Criminal Division)
- Appealed to: Supreme Court
- Subsequent actions: R v Armel Gnango [2012] EWCA Crim 77 (Hughes VP, Treacy & Blair JJ)

Court membership
- Judges sitting: Lord Phillips of Worth Matravers, Lord Brown of Eaton-under-Heywood, Lord Judge, Lord Kerr of Tonaghmore, Lord Clarke of Stone-cum-Ebony, Lord Dyson, Lord Wilson of Culworth

Case opinions
- If (1) D1 and D2 voluntarily engage in fighting each other, each intending to kill or cause grievous bodily harm to the other and each foreseeing that the other has the reciprocal intention, and if (2) D1 mistakenly kills V in the course of the fight, D2 also is guilty of the offence of murdering V.
- Decision by: Lord Phillips of Worth Matravers & Lord Judge, Lord Brown of Eaton-under-Heywood, Lord Clarke of Stone-cum-Ebony and Lord Dyson (Lord Kerr of Tonaghmore dissenting)

Keywords
- Accessories; Affray; Intention; Joint enterprise; Murder; Transferred malice; Victims

Regina v Armel Gnango [2011] UKSC 59 is the leading English criminal law case on the interaction of joint enterprise, transferred malice, and exemption from criminal liability where a party to what would normally be a crime is the victim of it. The Supreme Court held, restoring Gnango's conviction for the murder of Magda Pniewska, that he was guilty of murder notwithstanding the fact that he had not fired the shot which killed Pniewska during the shoot out which led to her death, and that the fatal shot had been fired by his opponent in an attempt to kill him. The judgment of the Supreme Court has been criticised over the alleged extent to which it was designed to mollify public opinion, and in the context of debates over the nature of the doctrine of joint enterprise.

== Background ==
At approximately 6.20 pm on 2 October 2007 a 26-year-old Polish care worker, Magda Pniewska, was making her way home from her place of work at Manley Court, a care home run by Bupa in New Cross in southeast London. While she was talking to her sister in Poland on her mobile telephone she was killed by a single shot to the head. She had been caught in the crossfire between two gunmen in a car park outside Stunnel House in John Williams Close. The two gunmen in question were seventeen-year-old Armel Gnango, a native of Sierra Leone, and "Bandana man". The apparent cause of the gunfight was a debt of less than £100.

Scientific examination showed that "Bandana man", not Gnango, had fired the fatal shot. After Pniewska was shot both Gnango and "Bandana man" fled the scene. The killing was widely reported in the media as an example of a "Wild West" shootout.

== Criminal proceedings ==
The police believed that TC was "Bandana man". He was arrested on suspicion of murder, but there was insufficient evidence to bring charges against him. Gnango was arrested four days after the shooting, and was subsequently charged with the attempted murder of "Bandana man", possession of a firearm with intent to endanger life and the murder of Pniewska.

In May 2008 Gnango stood trial at the Central Criminal Court before Mr Justice Cooke and a jury. He pleaded not guilty to all charges, although he admitted a lesser charge of possession of a firearm. Gnango testified that he had fired into the air with the intention of scaring off "Bandana man", that he had never used a firearm before and that he was in temporary possession of the firearm solely in order to sell it to a friend.

The jury rejected Gnango's evidence and on 22 May 2008 he was convicted of the murder of Pniewska, the attempted murder of "Bandana man" and possessing a firearm with intent to endanger life. As the jury convicted Gnango of the attempted murder of "Bandana man", they must have been sure that he intended to kill him. He was convicted of the murder of Pniewska, even though he did not fire the shot that killed her, under the doctrines of joint enterprise and transferred malice. The Crown Prosecution Service described the verdict as "unprecedented".

On 23 June 2008, at the Crown Court at St Albans, Mr Justice Cooke sentenced Gnango to detention for life for the murder of Pniewska, with a minimum term of twenty years, and imposed concurrent sentences of detention for public protection, with a minimum term of twelve years, for the attempted murder of "Bandana man" and a minimum term of five years for possession of a firearm with intent to endanger life.

== Appeal to the Court of Appeal (Criminal Division) ==
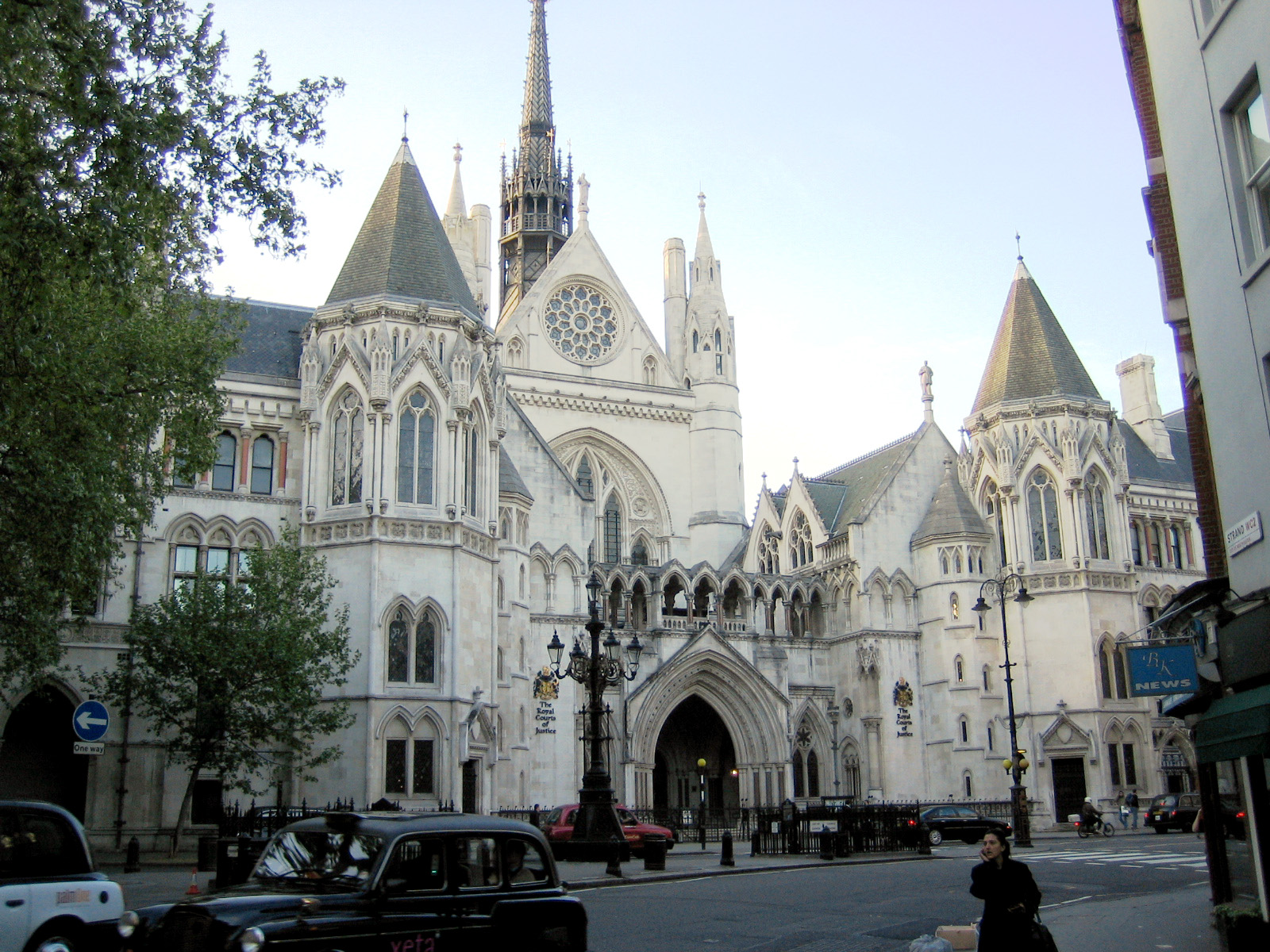
The Court of Appeal, where Gnango's conviction was quashed in 2010

With the leave of a single judge of the Court of Appeal, Gnango appealed against his conviction for the murder of Pniewska and made a renewed application for leave to appeal against the minimum terms of the sentences imposed upon him for the attempted murder of "Bandana man" and possession of a firearm with intent to endanger life. The court was constituted by Thomas, Hooper, Hughes & Gross LJJ and Hedley J and heard the appeal on 14 December 2009. Lord Justice Thomas gave the judgment of the court on 15 July 2010.

The court held that "[t]he jury was never asked to confront the question whether the shared common purpose was not only to shoot, but to be shot at". The court ruled that "[t]he existence of a joint enterprise in committing crime A is ... essential to liability. That joint enterprise can either rest on an agreement or common purpose to commit crime A or simple aiding and abetting crime A". The court considered that "simple participation in the affray with foresight, but without a joint enterprise to commit the affray, w[as ... in]sufficient to sustain the conviction". The court therefore allowed Gnango's appeal and quashed his conviction for the murder of Pniewska.

On 26 July 2010 the court dismissed Gnango's renewed application for leave to appeal against sentence. However, noting that it was a "clear case for a sentence which proclaimed the public abhorrence of the crime being marked by it" and the "very grave" aggravating features of the offending, the court exercised its powers under section 4 of the Criminal Appeal Act 1968 to increase Gnango's sentence for the attempted murder of "Bandana man" to detention for public protection with a minimum term of fifteen years.

== Appeal to the Supreme Court ==
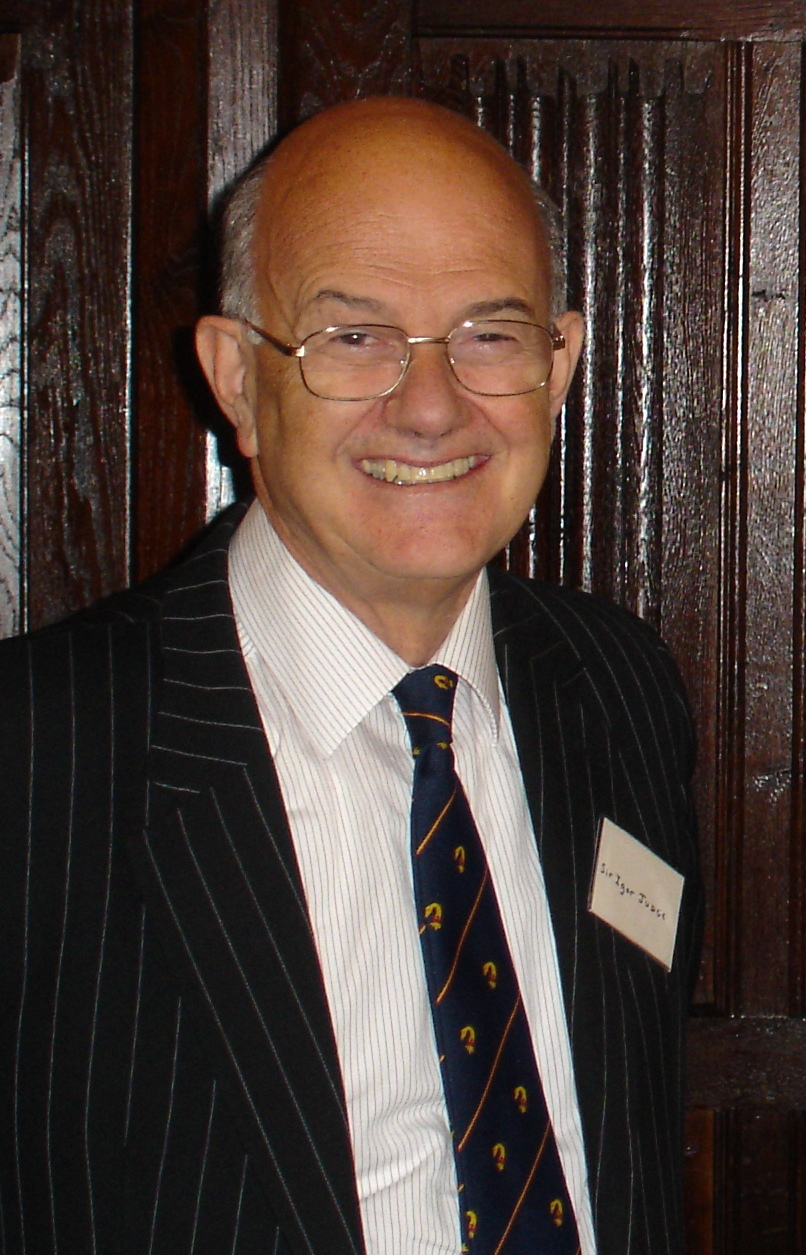
The Lord Chief Justice of England and Wales, Lord Judge co-wrote the controversial leading judgment of the Supreme Court

Under section 33(2) of the Criminal Appeal Act 1968, the Court of Appeal certified that the following point of law of general public importance was involved in its decision.

If (1) D1 and D2 voluntarily engage in fighting each other, each intending to kill or cause grievous bodily harm to the other and each foreseeing that the other has the reciprocal intention, and if (2) D1 mistakenly kills V in the course of the fight, in what circumstances, if any, is D2 guilty of the offence of murdering V?

The Supreme Court subsequently granted the Crown permission to appeal against the judgment of the Court of Appeal, and the appeal was heard before a panel of seven Justices on 11 and 12 July 2011. On 14 December 2011, the Supreme Court handed down its judgment. By a 6–1 majority, the court allowed the Crown's appeal, answered the certified question in the affirmative, and restored Gnango's conviction for the murder of Pniewska.

The President of the Court, Lord Phillips of Worth Matravers and the Lord Chief Justice of England and Wales, Lord Judge, jointly gave the leading judgment, with which Lord Wilson of Culworth agreed. They held that "[i]t is artificial to treat the intention to have an affray as a separate intention from the intention to have a potentially homicidal shooting match." They also held that "there is no common law rule that precludes conviction of a defendant of being party to a crime of which he was the actual or intended victim" and that consequently, under the doctrines of joint enterprise and transferred malice, Gnango was guilty of murder. They also held that it was unnecessary to determine whether Gnango was a principal in the first or second degree, arguing that "the offence is the same offence and the defendant is guilty of it".

Lord Brown of Eaton-under-Heywood concurred, adding that "The general public would be astonished and appalled if in those circumstances the law attached liability for the death only to the gunman who actually fired the fatal shot." He did, however, consider Gnango guilty as a principal. Lord Clarke of Stone-cum-Ebony agreed that Gnango was guilty as a principal. Lord Dyson concurred with the leading judgment and would have restored "the conviction on the basis that the jury must have been satisfied that the respondent aided and abetted the murder of Ms Pniewska by encouraging Bandana Man to shoot at him in the course of the planned shootout". Lord Kerr of Tonaghmore gave the only dissenting judgment. He would have dismissed the Crown's appeal on the basis that "there was no occasion for [the jury] to consider whether the requisite intention on the part of Gnango to found a verdict of guilty on the basis of aiding and abetting was present" and that Gnango could not have been guilty as a joint principal.

=== Consequential orders ===
On 19 January 2012, as a result of the judgment of the Supreme Court, the Court of Appeal (Hughes VP, Treacy & Blair JJ) restored Gnango's sentence of detention for life with a minimum term of twenty years for murder and reversed the Court of Appeal's earlier decision to increase the minimum term imposed for attempted murder.

== Reaction and analysis ==
Writing in The Guardian before the judgment of the Supreme Court was handed down, Anita Davies speculated that the reversal of the Court of Appeal's judgment would further complicate the law of joint enterprise and might "signal approval by English courts for a more American legal policy model for dealing with street violence".

Sir Richard Buxton, a former Lord Justice of Appeal, argued that "The Supreme Court approached the case with a strong propensity to find grounds for convicting G[nango] of murder." He described the reasoning of the court as "uncomfortable", and speculated that the trial judge and the jury would have considered it a "real oddity". He suggested that "Bandana Man" killing Pniewska rather than Gnango had "turned a man who otherwise would have been a suicide into a murderer".

Atli Stannard supported this analysis, suggesting that the prospect of Gnango being prosecuted for his own attempted murder "surely would ... be a farcical spectacle", and that the court's concern for public opinion had led it to make an erroneous decision.

Elaine Freer suggests that "it is very hard to see under what common law rule or legislation Gnango is guilty of murder ... [as] the mens rea for an affray is not the same as for a joint enterprise murder", while Alec Samuels considers that the case must be considered in the context of the "unsatisfactory state of the law and sentencing around murder and manslaughter", and the "[t]he basic problem [of] ... how far association amounts to complicity". Dr Jonathan Rogers, Senior Lecturer in Laws at University College London, suggests that an uncertain (quite obscure) route to finding the facts homicide renders the conviction unsafe and contrary to Article 6 of the European Convention on Human Rights, and that the decision was motivated by a desire to mollify public opinion.

The House of Commons Justice Committee, by contrast, noted only that the "case illustrates the difficulties that can arise for courts and juries considering the cases based on joint enterprise".

Before the Supreme Court had determined the appeal the Law Commission stated that the "case relates to a fairly narrow point" and that it could not offer an opportunity to address broader problems in the law of joint enterprise. The Commission concluded that "Legislative reform is ... needed."
