= Justice Osborne =

Justice Osborne may refer to:

- Charles Osborne (politician) (1760–1817), Justice of the King's Bench for Ireland
- Frank I. Osborne (1853–1920), justice of the United States Court of Private Land Claims
- Kenneth Osborne, Lord Osborne (born 1937), judge of the Supreme Courts of Scotland, on the High Court of Justiciary
