= Corporate Officer of the House of Commons v Information Commissioner =

- Court: High Court of Justice
- Decided: 16 May 2008
- Citations: [2008] EWHC 1084 (Admin), [2009] 3 All ER 403 (DC)

Court membership
- Judges sitting: Latham LJ, Blake J

Corporate Officer of the House of Commons v Information Commissioner [2008] EWHC 1084 (Admin) was the High Court case which resulted from the attempt to prevent the disclosure of the expense claims of Members of Parliament of the United Kingdom under the Freedom of Information Act 2000. The House of Commons lost the case.

== See also ==
- United Kingdom Parliamentary expenses scandal
