= WL (Congo) v Home Secretary =

WL (Congo) v Home Secretary was a 2011 legal case decided by the Supreme Court of the United Kingdom. The case decided that the unlawful imprisonment of foreign prisoners gives rise to the tort of false imprisonment without the need to prove damages even where it is demonstrated that they would have been imprisoned had power been lawfully exercised.

Dyson LJ said:

‘in cases such as these, all that the claimant has to do is to prove that he was detained. The Secretary of State must prove that the detention was justified in law. She cannot do this by showing that, although the decision to detain was tainted by public law error in the sense that I have described, a decision to detain free from error could and would have been made.’

== See also ==
- 2011 Judgments of the Supreme Court of the United Kingdom
