= Duncombe v Secretary of State for Children, Schools and Families =

Duncombe v SS for Children, Schools and Families
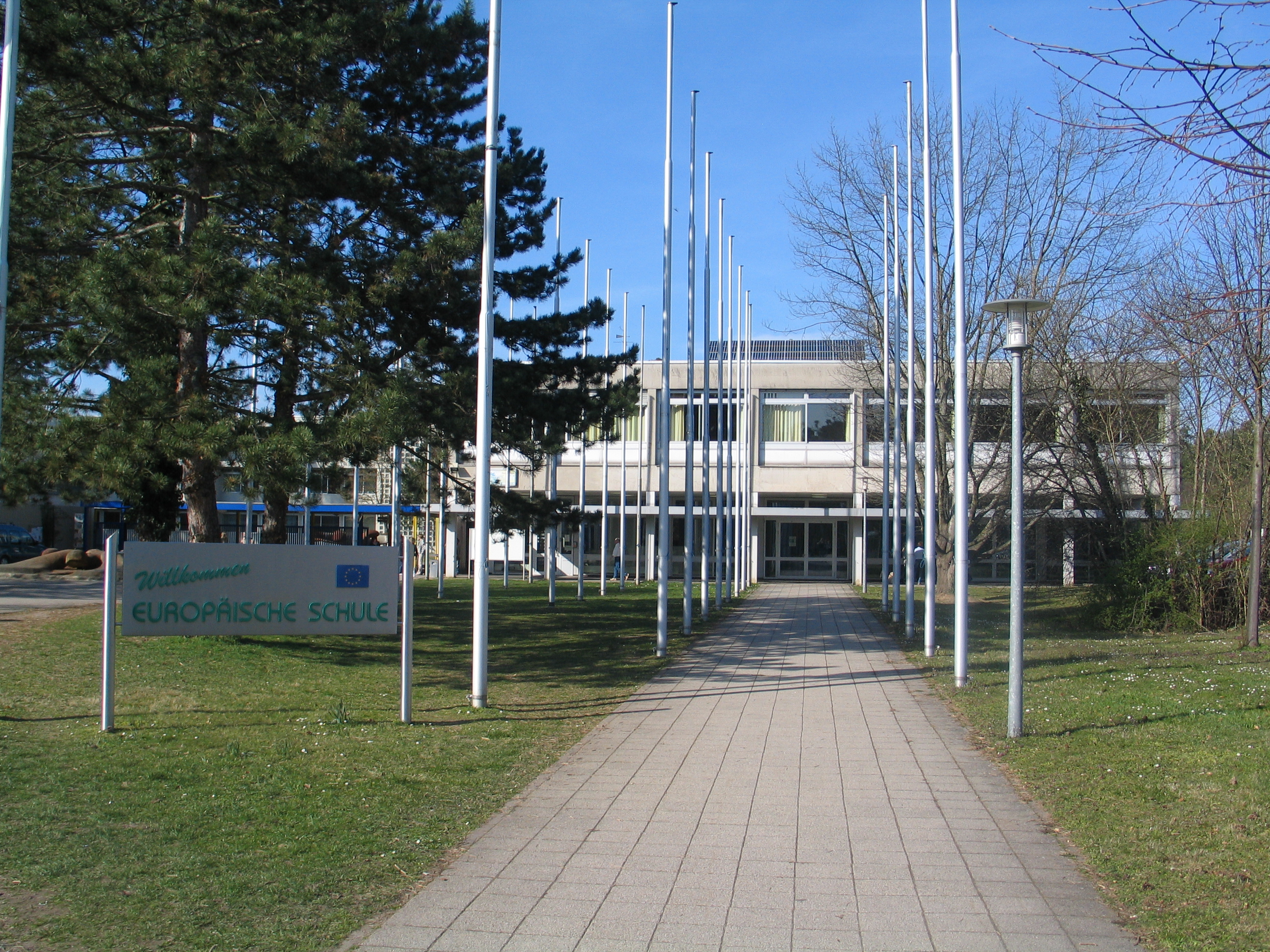
- European School, Karlsruhe
- Court: Supreme Court
- Citations: [2011] UKSC 11 and [2011] UKSC 36, [2011] ICR 495, [2011] IRLR 498

Keywords
- Conflict of laws, employment

Duncombe v Secretary of State for Children, Schools and Families [2011] UKSC 14 and [2011] UKSC 36 is a UK labour law case, concerning the test for when the continued used of a fixed term contract is objectively justified, and when employees are covered by employment rights during work abroad. The case was joined with Secretary of State for Children, Schools and Families v Fletcher.

During consideration of the case, Lord Rodger died. He participated in judgment on the point about fixed term contracts, but not in the judgment on unfair dismissal.

== Facts ==
Duncombe and other teachers were employed by the government to teach in various schools in the EU under the Statute of the European Schools. They taught children of officials and employees of the EU. They were claiming unfair dismissal because there was no objective justification for using fixed term contracts, and they contended they should be regarded as permanent under the Fixed-term Employees (Prevention of Less Favourable Treatment) Regulations 2002 regulation 8. Alternatively, they claimed that they had been unfairly dismissed under the Employment Rights Act 1996 section 94.

Fletcher, had worked at the European School, Culham, Oxfordshire, while Duncombe had worked at the European School, Karlsruhe, Germany. The contracts were limited to nine years, or exceptionally ten years under the Regulations for Members of the Seconded Staff of the European Schools 1996. The Secretary of State claimed it was not for the court of one member state to question the Regulations, or that the nine-year rule was objectively justified. The Secretary of State also contended that Duncombe was not covered because he was outside the UK.

The Court of Appeal held successive fixed-term contracts for work in European schools was not objectively justified.

== Judgment ==
Lady Hale and Lord Rodger decided that use of successive fixed term contracts was objectively justified under the Regulations.

23. The teachers' complaint is not against the three or four periods comprised in the nine year rule but against the nine year rule itself. In other words, they are complaining about the fixed-term nature of their employment rather than about the use of the successive fixed-term contracts which make it up. But that is not the target against which either the Fixed-term Directive or the Regulations is aimed. Had the Secretary of State chosen to offer them all nine year terms and take the risk that the schools would not have kept them for so long, they would have had no complaint. Employing people on single fixed-term contracts does not offend against either the Directive or the Regulations.

24. This is therefore the answer to Mr Giffin's attractive argument: that fixed-term contracts must be limited to work which is only needed for a limited term; and that where the need for the work is unlimited, it should be done on contracts of indefinite duration. This may well be a desirable policy in social and labour relations terms. It may even be the expectation against which the Directive and Framework Agreement were drafted. But it is not the target against which they were aimed, which was discrimination against workers on fixed-term contracts and abuse of successive fixed-term contracts in what was in reality an indefinite employment. It is not suggested that the terms and conditions on which the teachers were employed during their nine year terms were less favourable than those of comparable teachers on indefinite contracts.

25. It follows that the comprehensive demolition by the Employment Tribunal of the arguments for the nine year rule is nothing to the point. It is not that which requires to be justified, but the use of the latest fixed-term contract bringing the total period up to nine years. And that can readily be justified by the existence of the nine year rule. The teachers were employed to do a particular job which could only last for nine years. The Secretary of State could not foist those teachers on the schools for a longer period, no matter how unjustifiable either he or the employment tribunals of this country thought the rule to be. The teachers were not employed to do any alternative work because there was none available for them to do.

Lord Mance, Lord Collins and Lord Clarke agreed. The cross appeal concerned whether UK labour law applied so that there could be an unfair dismissal complaint under ERA 1996 section 94, on which judgment was reserved. Lord Rodger died in the meantime.

On the cross appeal question, Lady Hale held that the teachers were protected by Employment Rights Act 1996 section 94.

3. It is fair to say that had this issue stood alone it is unlikely that permission would have been given to bring an appeal to this Court. It is common ground that the basic principle was laid down by the House of Lords in Lawson v Serco Ltd [2006] UKHL 3, [2006] ICR 250. It is also common ground that these teachers' employment does not fall within either of the specific examples given in Lawson of people employed by British employers to work outside Great Britain who would be protected from unfair dismissal. The question is whether there are other examples of the principle, of which this is one.

[...]

16. In our view, these cases do form another example of an exceptional case where the employment has such an overwhelmingly closer connection with Britain and with British employment law than with any other system of law that it is right to conclude that Parliament must have intended that the employees should enjoy protection from unfair dismissal. This depends upon a combination of factors. First, as a sine qua non, their employer was based in Britain; and not just based here but the Government of the United Kingdom. This is the closest connection with Great Britain that any employer can have, for it cannot be based anywhere else. Second, they were employed under contracts governed by English law; the terms and conditions were either entirely those of English law or a combination of those of English law and the international institutions for which they worked. Although this factor is not mentioned in Lawson v Serco, it must be relevant to the expectation of each party as to the protection which the employees would enjoy. The law of unfair dismissal does not form part of the contractual terms and conditions of employment, but it was devised by Parliament in order to fill a well-known gap in the protection offered by the common law to those whose contracts of employment were ended. Third, they were employed in international enclaves, having no particular connection with the countries in which they happened to be situated and governed by international agreements between the participating states. They did not pay local taxes. The teachers were there because of commitments undertaken by the British government; the husbands, in Wallis and Grocott, were there because of commitments undertaken by the British government; and the wives were there because the British government thought it beneficial to its own undertaking to maximise the employment opportunities of their husbands' dependants. Fourth, it would be anomalous if a teacher who happened to be employed by the British government to work in the European School in England were to enjoy different protection from the teachers who happened to be employed to work in the same sort of school in other countries; just as it would be anomalous if wives employed to work for the British government precisely because their husbands were so employed, and sacked because their husbands ceased to be so employed, would be denied the protection which their husbands would have enjoyed.

== See also ==
- UK labour law
