= Jeremy Cooke =

British judge (born 1949)

Sir Jeremy Cooke
- Royal coat of arms of the United Kingdom

Justice of the High Court
- In office 2001–2016

Personal details
- Born: Jeremy Lionel Cooke; 28 April 1949 (age 77)
- Education: St Edmund Hall, Oxford
- Occupation: Judge

Sir Jeremy Lionel Cooke (born 28 April 1949), styled The Hon. Mr Justice Cooke, is a former judge in the Queen's Bench in the High Court starting from 2001 and was presiding judge for the South Eastern Circuit from 2007 to 2011, and judge in charge of the Commercial Court from 2012 to his retirement in 2016.

== Career ==
Educated at Whitgift School in Croydon and St Edmund Hall, Oxford, he became a solicitor in 1973 and was called to the Bar at Lincoln's Inn in 1976.

He became a QC in 1990, working at 7 King's Bench Walk, where he was noted as a leading "commercial silk" by The Lawyer, who said he specialised in "energy, insurance and reinsurance, professional negligence and shipping and maritime law." He became head of chambers in May 2000, replacing Stephen Tomlinson, who left and became a high court judge. Cooke himself became a judge in 2001, being replaced by Julian Flaux QC and Gavin Kealey QC as head of chambers. He acted as an assistant recorder 1994-8 then as a recorder 1998–2001.

=== High Court ===
Cooke was knighted in 2001, and that October he became a High Court judge, Queen's Bench Division, Commercial. With Mr Justice Bean, he became a presiding judge over the South Eastern Circuit on 1 January 2007. He was succeeded by Mr Justice Sweeney on 1 January 2012. Among the cases he has presided over as judge were the 2007 royal blackmail plot, the trial of Armel Gnango for the murder of Magda Pniewska, the trial of Roshonara Choudhry for stabbing Stephen Timms MP and the 2011 Pakistan cricket spot-fixing scandal.

Between 2013 and 2016, he presided over the case of R v Tom Hayes, which saw him hand the largest ever sentence for white collar crime in the UK. His last case was about the seizure of Hayes's assets, in which he ordered the payment of £878,806. He then retired in 2016. In July 2025, the Supreme Court of the United Kingdom overturned Hayes' conviction on appeal, finding that Cooke had given the jury inaccurate and unfair instructions that prevented Hayes from having a fair trial.

He has also served as a judge for Singapore's International Commercial Court and the Dubai International Financial Centre Court.

== Personal life ==
He was a member of Harlequin F.C. from 1970 to 1975. He has been vice-chairman of LICC Ltd since 1999 and was vice-president of the Lawyers' Christian Fellowship from 2003–2010.

== See also ==
- Stabbing of Stephen Timms
