= Edwards v Chesterfield Royal Hospital NHS Foundation Trust =

UK labour law case

Edwards v Chesterfield Royal Hospital
- Court: Supreme Court of the United Kingdom
- Full case name: Edwards v Chesterfield Royal Hospital NHS Foundation Trust and Botham v Ministry of Defence
- Citation: [2011] UKSC 58

Case history
- Prior action: [2010] EWCA Civ 571, [2010] IRLR 702

Keywords
- Wrongful dismissal

Edwards v Chesterfield Royal Hospital NHS Foundation Trust and Botham v Ministry of Defence [2011] UKSC 58 is a UK labour law case, concerning wrongful dismissal.

== Facts ==
Mr Edwards was dismissed from his surgeon job for ‘gross misconduct’ without having his contractual disciplinary procedure followed for alleged impropriety toward a female patient. The contract also said “the employment is subject to three months’ notice on either side”. The General Medical Council summarily dismissed his appeal. He claimed £3.8m in lost earnings and damage to reputation, arguing that if the procedure were proper, by having a lawyer and someone from his department on the panel, the allegations would not have been established against him, and his career would not have been wrecked. The GMC, however, did not prevent him continuing to work. The judge held that damages could not exceed the earnable income in the notice period, plus the period that a disciplinary procedure would last, and further damages were excluded by Johnson for the manner of the dismissal. The Court of Appeal held Mr Edwards could recover full damages for breach of express contractual disciplinary proceedings, and Johnson v Unisys Ltd only precludes a term being implied at common law for the manner of dismissal. Moore-Bick LJ ‘in cases where the claimant relies on the common law implied term it will sometimes be necessary to determine whether the act relied on formed part of the process of dismissal or preceded it. The need for that inquiry does not arise, however, in a case where the employee relies on an express term of the contract and accordingly in such cases the Johnson exclusion area is not a relevant concept.’ Ward LJ and Lloyd LJ concurred.

The case was joined to Botham v Ministry of Defence. Mr Botham was a youth community worker in Germany till he was dismissed by the MoD for gross misconduct for inappropriate behaviour with two teenage girls in September 2003. He was placed on a list of people unsuitable to work with children under the Protection of Children Act 1999, and not removed until July 2007. He claimed unfair dismissal. The Tribunal found he was unfairly dismissed, and was awarded the maximum, his name removed from the register. He then claimed damages for breach of contract in the High Court. Slade J in the High Court held that he could not recover damages, because it related to the manner of dismissal. Pill LJ approved an appeal, because of the Edwards case, and gave permission to go to the Supreme Court.

== Judgment ==
The Supreme Court held (Lady Hale, Lord Kerr and Lord Wilson dissenting) that neither Mr Edwards, nor Mr Botham, could claim more loss than would be available in an unfair dismissal claim. Breach of a disciplinary rule counted to the fairness of a dismissal in ERA 1996, and that was so during the EA 2002 and EA 2008 amendments. Parliament's enactment of unfair dismissal legislation, which was less generous than the common law, precluded any claim for damages relating to the manner of dismissal, whether formulated as either an express or an implied term. An employee could seek an injunction to halt the threatened breach of contract, however, as it still plainly remained a breach of contract.

Lord Dyson and Lord Walker said the following.

23. As Lord Nicholls said in Eastwood’s case at paras 12 and 13, Parliament has addressed the highly sensitive and controversial issue of what compensation should be paid to employees who are dismissed unfairly. In fixing the limits on the amount of compensatory awards, Parliament has expressed its view “on how the interests of employers and employees, and the social and economic interests of the country as a whole, are best balanced in cases of unfair dismissal”.

[...]

39. It is necessarily to be inferred from this statutory background that, unless they otherwise expressly agree, the parties to an employment contract do not intend that a failure to comply with contractually binding disciplinary procedures will give rise to a common law claim for damages. In these circumstances, I agree entirely with para 66 of Lord Hoffmann's speech.

[...]

43. No example was cited to us of any case decided before the 1971 Act in which an employee was awarded damages for breach of contract for the unfair manner in which he had been dismissed.

44. That is not to say that an employer who starts a disciplinary process in breach of the express terms of the contract of employment is not acting in breach of contract. He plainly is. If that happens, it is open to the employee to seek an injunction to stop the process and/or to seek an appropriate declaration. Miss O'Rourke QC submitted that, if in such a situation there is a breach of contract sufficient to support the grant of an injunction but (for whatever reason) the employee does not obtain an injunction, it is anomalous if the normal common law remedy of damages is in principle not available to him. The short answer to this submission is that an injunction to prevent a threatened unfair dismissal does not cut across the statutory scheme for compensation for unfair dismissal. None of the objections based on the co-existence of inconsistent parallel common law and statutory rights applies. The grant of injunctive or declaratory relief for an actual or threatened breach of contract would not jeopardise the coherence of our employment laws and would not be a recipe for chaos in the way that, as presaged by Lord Millett in Johnson, the recognition of parallel and inconsistent rights to seek compensation for unfair dismissal in the tribunal and damages in the courts would be.

Lord Phillips gave a short speech.

Lady Hale said the following.

110. In my view the Court of Appeal reached the right conclusions for the right reasons and both appeals should be dismissed. As the majority take a different view, I shall be brief. But I should perhaps declare an interest, as the only member of this court to have spent a substantial proportion of her working life as an employee rather than as a self-employed barrister or tenured office holder.

[...]

122. I am uncertain as to how the majority would regard the case of an employee with the contractual right only to be dismissed for cause. Like Lord Kerr, I am puzzled as to how it can be possible for an employee with a contractual right to a particular disciplinary process to enforce that right in advance by injunction but not possible for him to claim damages for its breach after the event. And I am also puzzled why it should make a difference if the right to claim damages is expressly spelled out in the contract.

Lord Mance agreed with Lord Dyson.

Lord Kerr (and Lord Wilson concurring) would have held that Mr Edwards should succeed in his claim, but because Mr Botham's reputational damage was inextricably linked to the manner of his dismissal, he could not have a successful claim.

== See also ==
- UK labour law
