= Transferred intent =

Legal doctrine regarding criminal intention

Transferred intent (or transferred mens rea, or transferred malice, in English law) is a legal doctrine that holds that, when the intention to harm one individual inadvertently causes a second person to be hurt instead, the perpetrator is still held responsible. To be held legally responsible, a court typically must demonstrate that the perpetrator had criminal intent (mens rea), that is, that they knew or should have known that another would be harmed by their actions and wanted this harm to occur. For example, if a murderer intends to kill John, but accidentally kills George instead, the intent is transferred from John to George, and the killer is held to have had criminal intent.

Transferred intent also applies to tort law, in which there are generally five areas where transferred intent is applicable: battery, assault, false imprisonment, trespass to land, and trespass to chattels. Generally, any intent to cause any one of these five torts which results in the completion of any of the five tortious acts will be considered an intentional act, even if the actual target of the tort is one other than the intended target of the original tort.

See cases of Carnes v. Thompson, 48 S.W.2d 903 (Mo. 1932) and Bunyan v. Jordan (1937), 57 C.L.R. 1, 37 S.R.N.S.W. 119 for examples.

== Discussion ==
=== In the United States ===
In United States criminal law, transferred intent is sometimes explained by stating that "the intent follows the bullet". That is, the intent to kill a person by gunshot would still apply even if the bullet kills an unintended victim (see mens rea).

In Ohio law, the doctrine of transferred intent was held to be valid in Bradshaw v. Richey. It cited the 1988 decision in State v. Sowell, which said "if one purposely causes the death of another and the death is the result of a scheme designed to implement the calculated decision to kill someone other than the victim, the offender is guilty of aggravated murder", and concluded that the doctrine was "firmly rooted" in Ohio precedent dating to at least 1874.

A 1960s-era proposal, the Model Penal Code, invited states to adopt a standard where an element of a crime could be established, even though:

- The offender caused the intended harm, but to a different person or item than the one they intended; or
- The offender caused "the same kind of injury or harm" as intended, in a manner that was "not too remote or accidental in its occurrence".

=== In the United Kingdom ===
In the UK the transferred malice doctrine is not without controversy. The House of Lords in Attorney General's Reference No 3 of 1994 reversed the Court of Appeal decision (reported at (1996) 2 WLR 412), holding that the doctrine of transferred malice could not apply to convict an accused of murder when the defendant had stabbed a pregnant woman in the face, back and abdomen. Some days after she was released from hospital in an apparently stable condition, she went into labour and gave birth to a premature child, who died four months later. The child had been wounded in the original attack but the more substantial cause of death was her prematurity. It was argued that the fetus was part of the mother so that any intention to cause grievous bodily harm (GBH) to the mother was also an intent aimed at the fetus. Lord Mustill criticised the doctrine as having no sound intellectual basis, saying that it was related to the original concept of malice, i.e. that a wrongful act displayed a malevolence which could be attached to any adverse consequence, and this had long been out of date. Nevertheless, it would sometimes provide a justification to convict when that was a common sense outcome and so could sensibly be retained. The present case was not a simple "transfer" from mother to uterine child, but sought to create an intention to cause injury to the child after birth. This would be a double transfer: first from the mother to the fetus, and then from the fetus to the child when it was born. Then one would have to apply the fiction which converts an intention to commit GBH into the mens rea of murder. That was too much. But the accused could be convicted of manslaughter.

In R v Gnango, the Supreme Court controversially held that under the doctrines of joint enterprise and transferred malice D2 is guilty of V's murder if D1 and D2 voluntarily engage in fighting each other, each intending to kill or cause grievous bodily harm to the other and each foreseeing that the other has the reciprocal intention, and if D1 mistakenly kills V in the course of the fight.
