= Jivraj v Hashwani =

- Court: Supreme Court of the United Kingdom
- Decided: July 27, 2011
- Citations: [2011] UKSC 40, [2011] WLR 1872

Case history
- Prior action: [2010] EWCA Civ 712

Court membership
- Judges sitting: Lord Phillips, Lord Walker, Lord Mance, Lord Clarke, Lord Dyson

Case opinions
- Lord Clarke

Keywords
- Discrimination, scope, genuine occupational requirement

Jivraj v Hashwani [2011] UKSC 40 is a United Kingdom labour law case concerning the scope of employment. Considering European labour law cases and the purpose of discrimination legislation, it held that it was legitimate to select a person of a particular religion to be an arbitrator, here an Ismaili.

== Facts ==
Jivraj and Hashwani started a property investment joint venture in 1981, with a term that disputes should go to three arbitrators, one appointed by each, and all from the Ismaili community. In 1988 it was terminated, and some assets divided. In 2008, Hashwani’s solicitors wrote claiming more payment and requesting an arbitrator, but identifying a preferred non-Ismaili arbitrator. Jivraj said this was invalid, but Hashwani argued that the Ismaili requirement was contrary to EERBR 2003 r 6(1) and Directive 2000/78/EC art 3.

The Judge held EERBR 2003 did not apply to arbitrators, but even if it did, it would be a genuine occupational requirement under EERBR 2003 r 7. The Court of Appeal, Moore-Bick LJ for Aikens LJ and Buxton LJ, held an arbitrator appointment was a contract for provision of services, and ‘a contract personally to do any work’ which satisfied the definition of ‘employment in EERBR 2003 r 2(3), and that a party appointing an arbitrator was an ‘employer’ under r 6(1). Thus, restricting to Ismaili’s was contrary to r 6(1)(a)(c) and the exception in r 7 did not apply because being Ismaili was unnecessary for discharging an arbitrator’s functions. Because this would make the whole agreement substantially different the arbitration clause as a whole was void under EERBR 2003 Sch 4, para 1(1).

Laurence Rabinowitz QC, Christopher Style QC and Christopher McCrudden intervened for the London Court of International Arbitration. Thomas Linden QC, Toby Landau QC, Paul Key and David Craig intervened for the International Chamber of Commerce. Rabinder Singh QC and Aileen McColgan intervened with written submissions for the His Highness Prince Aga Khan Shia Imami Ismaili International Conciliation and Arbitration Board.

== Judgment ==
Lord Clarke held that an arbitrator’s position could not fall under the EERBR 2003 (now the EA 2010 s 13) because it had to be construed in light of the aim of Directive 2000/78, and the jurisprudence of the ECJ. This drew a clear distinction, beyond the requirement of work for a wage in Lawrie-Blum, between those in a subordinate position, as in Allonby, and independent providers of services. An arbitrator was not subordinate, and not even a contract personally to do work. No part of the agreement was invalid. Percy v Board of National Mission of the Church of Scotland [2006] 2 AC 28, HL(Sc) and the opinion of AG Maduro from Centrum voor Gelijkheid van Kansen en voor Racismebestrijding v Firma Feryn NV (Case C-54/07) [2008] ICR 1390 was considered . If the regulations had been applicable, though, they would have fallen under r 7(3) as a genuine occupational requirement because an Ismaili requirement was indeed genuine and also justifiable.

Lord Phillips, Lord Walker and Lord Dyson concurred.

Lord Mance agreed that an arbitrator would fall outside the Regulations, but did not agree that the exception would be justified if the point arose. On the former consideration he quoted as follow from,

1904 (RGZ 59, 247), the German Reichsgericht identified the particular nature of an arbitral contract, in terms which I think have a relevance to arbitration generally, when it said (in translation):

“It does not seem permissible to treat the arbitrator as equivalent to a representative or an employee or an entrepreneur. His office has … an entirely special character, which distinguishes him from other persons handling the affairs of third parties. He has to decide a legal dispute in the same way as and instead of a judge, identifying the law by matching the relevant facts to the relevant legal provisions. The performance expected from him is the award, which constitutes the goal and outcome of his activity. It is true that the extent of his powers depends on the arbitration agreement, which can to a greater or lesser extent prescribe the way to that goal for him. But, apart from this restriction, his position is entirely free, freer than that of an ordinary judge.”

== See also ==
- UK labour law
