= Baker v Quantum Clothing Group Ltd =

- Court: UK Supreme Court
- Citation: [2011] UKSC 17, [2011] 1 WLR 1003

Baker v Quantum Clothing Group Ltd [2011] UKSC 17 is an English tort law case, concerning breach of the duty of care.

== Facts ==
Mrs Baker claimed she lost her hearing in the knitting factory in Ashfield, Nottinghamshire, from 1971 to 1989 when there was noise levels of 85 to 90 decibels, over 8 hour periods. The factory passed to Quantum Clothing Group Ltd. Others brought similar claims, but were dismissed, and only Mrs Baker was found to suffer hearing loss, but her claim was still dismissed for there being no breach of duty in negligence or the Factories Act 1961 section 29 that ‘every place at which any person has at any time to work... shall, so far as is reasonably practicable, be made and kept safe for any person working there.’

The Court of Appeal allowed Mrs Baker's claim, and parts of the other claims, holding liability arose from 1988 for employers with an average degree of knowledge. Employers were liable under FA 1961 s 29 from 1978, because it was stricter.

== Judgment ==
The Supreme Court allowed the appeal by three to two, holding there was no breach of the duty of care or the Factories Act 1961 section 29.

Lord Mance gave the leading judgment. He quoted approvingly Mustill J, that negligence could consist in ‘an absence of initiative in seeking out knowledge of facts which are not in themselves obvious’ but while employer ‘must keep up to date... the court must be slow to blame him for not ploughing a lone furrow.’ A 1972 Code of Practice published by the Department of Employment, which recommended a noise exposure limit of 90 dB(A)lep. This was fine until the draft European Directive 1986, a 1988 consultative document recommended a lower limit. Under the FA 1961 s 29 the concepts of ‘safe’ and ‘reasonably practicable’ referred to general knowledge and standards of the time, and was not more stringent than common law.

Lord Dyson concurred, and Lord Saville agreed with both.

Lord Kerr and Lord Clarke dissented. They held that the terms of the Code of Practice and other material available by 1976 were such that employers should have been aware that damage to hearing could occur at levels below 90 dB(A)lepd and that certain individuals in the workforce would be particularly vulnerable at those levels.

== See also ==
- English tort law
