= 39 Essex Chambers =

Barristers' chambers in London, England

- Headquarters: Chancery Lane; London, EC4; United Kingdom
- No. of lawyers: At least 154
- Major practice areas: Civil liability, commercial, construction, costs & litigation funding, energy, environmental, planning, property, public, regulatory and disciplinary law.
- Website: www.39essex.com

39 Essex Chambers is a long established barristers' chambers based in London with over 150 barristers, including 58 King's Counsel. The chambers offers expertise in commercial, common, construction, costs, environmental and planning, public and regulatory and disciplinary law.

Members of chambers regularly appear before the UK Supreme Court, Privy Council, Court of Appeal, the European Court of Human Rights and the European Court of Justice, specialist courts, tribunals and planning and other public inquiries, as well as of domestic and international arbitration. It is one of the largest barristers' chambers in the country. The chambers have offices in London, Manchester, Singapore and Kuala Lumpur.

Legal Cheek has rated 39 Essex Chambers as having an "A*" quality of work and legal technology.

== Notable members ==
Notable current and former members include Lord Dyson; Robert Jay KC, lead counsel to the Leveson Inquiry; Sir David Foskett and Dame Justine Thornton. Several members have gone on to join the judiciary.
