= Sienkiewicz v Greif (UK) Ltd =

- Court: UK Supreme Court
- Citation: [2011] UKSC 10, [2011] 2 AC 229

Sienkiewicz v Greif (UK) Ltd [2011] UKSC 10 is an English tort law case, concerning causation between a breach of duty and damage.

== Facts ==
Sienkiewicz was the daughter of Mrs Costello, who had mesothelioma and died after asbestos from Greif Ltd's negligence, but also through environmental exposure. Exposure at work, held the judge, increased the risk of mesothelioma by 18%. Greif Ltd argued Fairchild v Glenhaven Ltd only applied when there was more than one defendant, and causation had to be established by the balance of probabilities when there was just one employer. This required her to show Greif Ltd's negligence had ‘doubled the risk’ from non-tortious factors. It was not established on the facts. Even if Fairchild did apply, Greif said its negligence still had to double the environmental risk to count as material.

The Court of Appeal held the claimant won based on Compensation Act 2006 section 3, which mandated that a material increase in risk would satisfy causation.

== Judgment ==
The Supreme Court held that as long as the defendant's negligence resulted in more than a de minimis exposure, they would be liable for all the damage from mesothelioma. It rejected that a defendant must be shown to have doubled the risk for this to qualify as material.

Lord Phillips said the following:

70. Section 3(1) does not state that the responsible person will be liable in tort if he has materially increased the risk of a victim of mesothelioma. It states that the section applies where the responsible person is liable in tort for materially increasing that risk....

71. Greif contend that the Court should identify an exception to the Fairchild/Barker rule where there has been only one occupational exposure to risk and that, in those circumstances, the Court can and should apply the ‘doubles the risk’ test. Section 3 poses no bar to that contention; it must be considered on its merits....

80. Epidemiology is the study of the occurrence and distribution of events (such as disease) over human populations. It seeks to determine whether statistical associations between these events and supposed determinants can be demonstrated....

107. Liability for mesothelioma falls on anyone who has materially increased the risk of the victim contracting the disease.

Lord Mance said:

That epidemiological evidence used with proper caution, can be admissible and relevant in conjunction with specific evidence related to the individual circumstances and parties is, however, common ground and clearly right... Whether, and if so when, epidemiological evidence can by itself prove a case is a question best considered not in the abstract but in a particular case, when and if that question arises. If it can, I would hope and expect that this would only occur in the rarest of cases.

== See also ==
- English tort law
