= United Kingdom intellectual property law =

Part of English property law

United Kingdom intellectual property law is a part of English property law which concerns the rights of intangible but valuable information or rights. It covers in particular:

- United Kingdom trade mark law
- Copyright law of the United Kingdom
- United Kingdom patent law

== See also ==
- English land law
- English trusts law
