= GPS Inc v Syarikat Takaful Malaysia Berhad =

GPS v Syarikat
- Court: Supreme Court of the United Kingdom
- Decided: 1 February 2011
- Citation: [2011] UKSC 5
- Transcript: press summary

Court membership
- Judges sitting: Lord Mance, Lord Collins, Lord Clarke, Lord Dyson, Lord Saville

GPS Inc. v Syarikat Takaful Malaysia Berhad is a 2011 decision of the Supreme Court of the United Kingdom on marine insurance and the law of carriage of goods by sea. The case addresses issues of "causa proxima" and the extent of any alleged "warranty of seaworthiness of cargo".

The case concerned an oil rig which was being transported by sea on a barge from Galveston, Texas, to Malaysia.. The weather at the time was normal and unexceptional. The rig was a platform with legs some 300 feet long, and when in situ, the legs would reach down to the ocean bed. While on the barge, the legs were extended 300 feet into the air. During the voyage, one leg broke off, and shortly after all the other legs broke too. It was later determined that the loss of the legs resulted from metal fatigue caused by related stress caused by the motion of the waves.

The insurers argued that the proximate cause ("causa proxima") was "Inherent Vice" of the cargo, for which they would not be liable. Lord Diplock's definition of "Inherent Vice" in Soya GmbH Mainz Kommanditgesellschaft v White was acknowledged by both parties. The insurers cited and relied on Mayban General Insurance v Alstom Power Plants. Mayban had held that goods tendered for shipment had to be capable of withstanding the forces that they could ordinarily be expected to encounter during the voyage. The court held that Mayan was wrongly decided as, if it were to stand, it would wrongly reduce the scope of cargo insurance cover to loss through perils of the sea that was "exceptional, unforeseen or unforeseeable".

In summary, the Lords held that the loss was fortuitous, that the causa proxima was not "Inherent Vice", but that the true proximate cause was a "Peril of the Sea". Accordingly, the insurers were liable to indemnify the assured for their loss.

- Since the loss was caused by a peril of the sea, the carriers would not be liable (via their P&I Club) under the Hague or Hague-Visby Rules.
- The full name of GPS Inc is Global Process Systems Inc.
