= S and Marper v United Kingdom =

MarperUnited Kingdom

- Court: European Court of Human Rights
- Decided: 4 December 2008
- Citations: [2008] ECHR 1581; Application nos. 30562/04 and 30566/04

Keywords
- DNA, privacy

S and Marper v United Kingdom [2008] ECHR 1581 is a case decided by the European Court of Human Rights which held that holding DNA samples of individuals arrested but who are later acquitted or have the charges against them dropped is a violation of the right to privacy under the European Convention on Human Rights.

== Facts ==
In England, Wales and Northern Ireland, since 2004, any individual arrested for any recordable offence has had a DNA sample taken and stored as a digital profile in the National DNA Database. Even if the individual was never charged, if criminal proceedings were discontinued, or if the person was later acquitted of any crime, their DNA profile could nevertheless be kept permanently on record. The majority of the Council of Europe member states allow the compulsory taking of fingerprints and DNA samples in the context of criminal proceedings; however the United Kingdom (specifically, England, Wales and Northern Ireland) was the only member state that expressly permitted the systematic and indefinite retention of such DNA profiles. In contrast, DNA samples taken in Scotland when individuals are arrested must be destroyed if the individual is not charged or convicted.

The case involved two claimants from Sheffield, England: Mr. S. and Michael Marper. Mr S. was arrested on 19 January 2001 at the age of eleven and charged with attempted robbery. His fingerprints and DNA samples were taken. He was acquitted on 14 June 2001. Michael Marper was arrested on 13 March 2001 and charged with harassment of his partner. His fingerprints and DNA samples were taken. The charge was not pressed because Marper and his partner became reconciled before a pretrial review had taken place.

=== Procedural history ===
The decision of the European Court of Human Rights overturned judgments favourable to the government from the United Kingdom's House of Lords, Court of Appeal and High Court. Both claimants had asked the Police Chief Constable for the samples of their DNA that had been taken to be destroyed. The Administrative Division of the High Court refused an application for judicial review in 2002 of the decision not to destroy the fingerprints and samples, and this decision was in turn upheld by the Court of Appeal in 2003. That judgment noted that the Police Chief Constable did retain the power to destroy samples in the rare instance in which he was completely satisfied that the individual was free from all suspicion whatsoever, and when the retention of samples had enabled information to be used for the legitimate purpose of combating crime.

On appeal to the House of Lords in 2004, Lord Steyn also observed the considerable value of retained fingerprints and samples, and commented on the Criminal Justice and Police Act 2001, in that it had been enacted to replace the previous law which had provided that DNA samples could be destroyed following the acquittal of an accused. However, in Baroness Hale’s observation, later mentioned by the European Court of Human Rights judgment, retention of both fingerprint and DNA data constituted an interference by the State with a person's right to respect for his private life which attracted the protection of Article 8 of the European Convention on Human Rights, and therefore required justification by the state.

=== Submissions ===
When the matter was before the European Court of Human Rights' Grand Chamber, the non-governmental organizations Liberty and Privacy International were granted permission to file third-party submissions and submitted scientific evidence on the private nature of genetic material and information contained in DNA samples. Liberty stressed that general principles of European human rights law dictated that interference by a member state with an individual's rights under the Convention must be “necessary in a democratic society” and have a legitimate aim to answer a “pressing social need"; even then an identified interference must be proportionate and remains subject to review by the Court (Coster v United Kingdom (2001) 33 EHRR 479)).

The applicants stressed that the nature of DNA samples, which included a myriad highly personal data pertaining to an individual's unique identity, susceptibility to certain medical conditions and was linked to genetic information of their relatives, meant that not only the taking of the data, but its storage, retention and constant automatic corroboration against other samples taken from current criminal investigations, caused them to suffer unwanted stigma and adverse psychological consequences. This was especially so in the case of S, as he was a child at the time of having his samples taken and relied on Article 40 of the UN Convention on the Rights of the Child of 1989, which states that it is the right of every child alleged to have infringed a penal law to be treated in a manner consistent with the promotion of the child's dignity and worth, reinforcing the respect for the child's human rights and fundamental freedoms.

In response, the United Kingdom submitted that the use of the DNA samples was permitted under the Police and Criminal Evidence Act 1984 and did not fall under the scope of Article 8 of the Convention. According to the United Kingdom's government, retention of the data did not impair the physical or psychological integrity of a person, restrict personal development, inhibit ability to establish personal relationships, or the right of self-determination. The DNA profile was merely a sequence of numbers which provided a means of identifying a person against bodily tissue and was not materially intrusive; the retention of data was a legitimate aim because it assisted in the identification of future offenders.

== Judgment ==
In a unanimous verdict, the seventeen-judge bench held that there had been a violation of Article 8 and awarded €42,000 to each of the applicants. The Court did therefore not go on to consider whether the retention of DNA was also a breach of Article 14 (prohibition of discrimination) as the applicants had also argued that they had suffered detrimental treatment on the basis of an acquired status. Notably, another part of the United Kingdom, namely Scotland, had provided an example of a proportionate, more rational approach in regard to DNA retention, in that samples were to be destroyed if an individual was not convicted or was granted an absolute discharge; an exemption however exists for the authorities to retain samples if the individual is suspected of certain sexual or violent offences (Retention Guidelines for Nominal Records on the Police National Computer 2006).

Through this ruling, the European Court of Human Rights has further developed its body of jurisprudence on what measures are likely to fall outside a state's margin of appreciation. The Court determined that where there is no consensus between member states as to how important a matter at stake is, the margin ought to be wider, however as the facts in this instance involved the interference with intimate details of utmost importance to the individual, the margin allowed to the state was narrow and the United Kingdom had not struck the right balance.

== Significance ==
In May 2009, nearly 6 months after the court decision, the Home Office announced a consultation on how to comply with the ruling. The government proposed to continue retaining indefinitely the DNA profiles of anyone convicted of any recordable offence, but to remove other profiles from the database after a number of years. The practice of taking DNA profiles upon arrest is not affected by the decision – for adults arrested but not actually convicted of any crime, it is proposed that their profiles will deleted from the database after 6 years, except for those whose arrest was in connection with a serious violent or sexual crime; their profiles will be stored for 12 years before deletion. Young people arrested but not convicted will have their profiles removed when they turn 18 years of age, as will youths convicted of some less serious offences.

As of January 2011, this consultation remains unimplemented. The Northern Irish High Court has ruled that the regulations Marper declared breached article 8 should be followed despite the Marper decision. They said it was up to the government to change the law. This decision has been criticised, particularly since it was open to the court to declare the blanket DNA retention policy incompatible with the European Convention of Human Rights.

In February 2011 the government announced the Protection of Freedoms Bill to limit the scope of the DNA database and comply with the Marper ruling. Under the new scheme the DNA profiles of those arrested or charged with a minor offence would be destroyed if they are not convicted. The vast majority of the one million people on the DNA database who have been arrested but not convicted of a crime would be removed from it within months of the bill becoming law.

On 18 May 2011 the UK Supreme Court ruled that the ACPO guidelines allowing indefinite retention of DNA profiles were unlawful, in line with the ECHR ruling. However given that Parliament was already legislating on the issue they decided that no further action should be taken.

According to The Independent on 27 July 2011, the UK government "has indicated that destroying the DNA of the innocent would be impossible because the records are mixed up in batches alongside the DNA of the guilty." The "Home Office minister James Brokenshire has revealed that these profiles will be retained by forensic science laboratories. The retained samples will be anonymised."

== See also ==
- United Kingdom National DNA Database
