= Russell v Transocean International Resources Ltd =

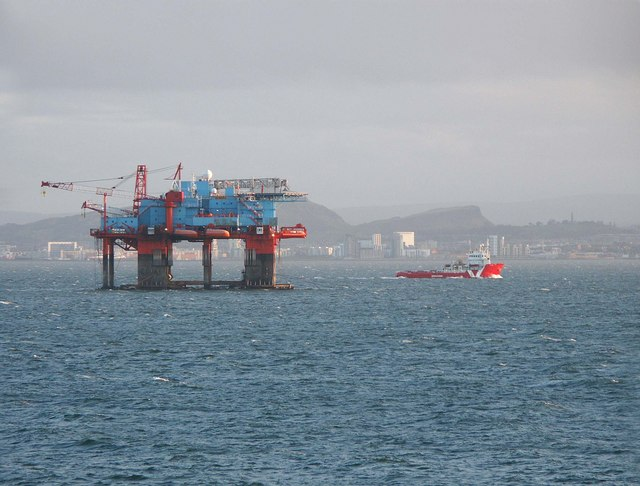
- Offshore oil rig
- Court: UK Supreme Court
- Citation: [2011] UKSC 57

Keywords
- Competition, collusion

Russell v Transocean International Resources Ltd [2011] UKSC 57 is a UK labour law case, concerning the interpretation of the Working Time Directive. It is notable that Lord Hope remarked that the right to paid holidays is probably best interpreted as requiring that workers may take a whole week at a time, rather than individual days.

== Facts ==
Workers on an offshore oil and gas rig claimed paid annual leave for the time they were offshore under the Working Time Directive 2003/88/EC article 7, and the Working Time Regulations 1998 regulation 13. This would effectively double their holiday pay because most of them had shifts where they worked two weeks off shore and two weeks on shore as the ‘field break’, when they were mostly free from work related obligations, but had to do training, medical assessments, and so on. When offshore they did 12-hour shifts every day. The employers argued that they were not entitled, because the field breaks counted as leave, not working.

The parties appealed from the Aberdeen Employment Tribunal and Court of Session to the House of Lords.

== Judgment ==
Lord Hope held that it was plain that the workers were not working when they came back onshore, and this was so obvious as to not require a reference to the ECJ. He noted that the requirement for ‘four weeks’ seemed to mean four week long periods, uninterrupted, but the weeks themselves could be separated. He said the following.

18. Article 7 is headed "Annual leave". As article 17 makes clear, it cannot be derogated from. It is in these terms:

"1. Member states shall take the measures necessary to ensure that every worker is entitled to paid annual leave of at least four weeks in accordance with the conditions for entitlement to, and granting of, such leave laid down by national legislation and/or practice. 2. The minimum period of paid annual leave may not be replaced by an allowance in lieu, except where the employment relationship is terminated."

The words "consecutive" and "uninterrupted" which qualify the periods of daily rest in article 3 and weekly rest in article 5 do not appear here. So article 7 does not require that the weeks of annual leave must be taken consecutively or that those weeks cannot be interrupted.

19. The units of time referred to in recital 5 of the preamble (days, hours and/or fractions thereof) do not include weeks. But the text of articles 5 and 6 shows that the word "weekly", which appears in the heading to those articles, refers to a seven-day period. Article 21 of the WTD, which deals with workers on board seagoing fishing vessels, also refers to a seven-day period, as does article 22. In this context the reference in article 7 to "four weeks", rather than to 28 days, would seem prima facie to mean four uninterrupted seven-day periods, but the conditions of the granting of such leave are left to national legislation and/or practice. As a period of leave is not a period which is working time, as defined in article 2, it must be taken to be what that article defines as a rest period. It is an annual period of rest: see recital 5.

[...]

38. … the respondents are entitled to insist that the appellants must take their paid annual leave during periods when they are onshore on field break. In my opinion this is permitted by regulation 13 of the WTR, read in conformity with article 7 of the WTD.

[...]

43. I am not persuaded that a reference is necessary in this case on any of the questions that have been listed. We must be mindful of our responsibility as a court against whose decisions there is no judicial remedy under national law. But the ruling in Srl CILFIT v Ministry of Health (Case 283/81) [1982] ECR 3415 permits us to decline to make a reference if a decision on the point is not necessary to enable the court to give judgment or the answer to the question is acte clair. I do not think that the meaning to be given to article 7, for the purposes of this judgment, is open to any reasonable doubt. The wording and structure of the WTD plainly favours the respondents' argument, and I can find nothing in any of the judgments of the ECJ to which we were referred that casts doubt on the meaning which I think should be given to it. I would refuse the request for a reference.’

Lord Brown, Lord Mance, Lord Kerr, and Lord Wilson concurred.

== See also ==
- EU competition law
