= Serco Ltd v Lawson =

Lawson v Serco Ltd
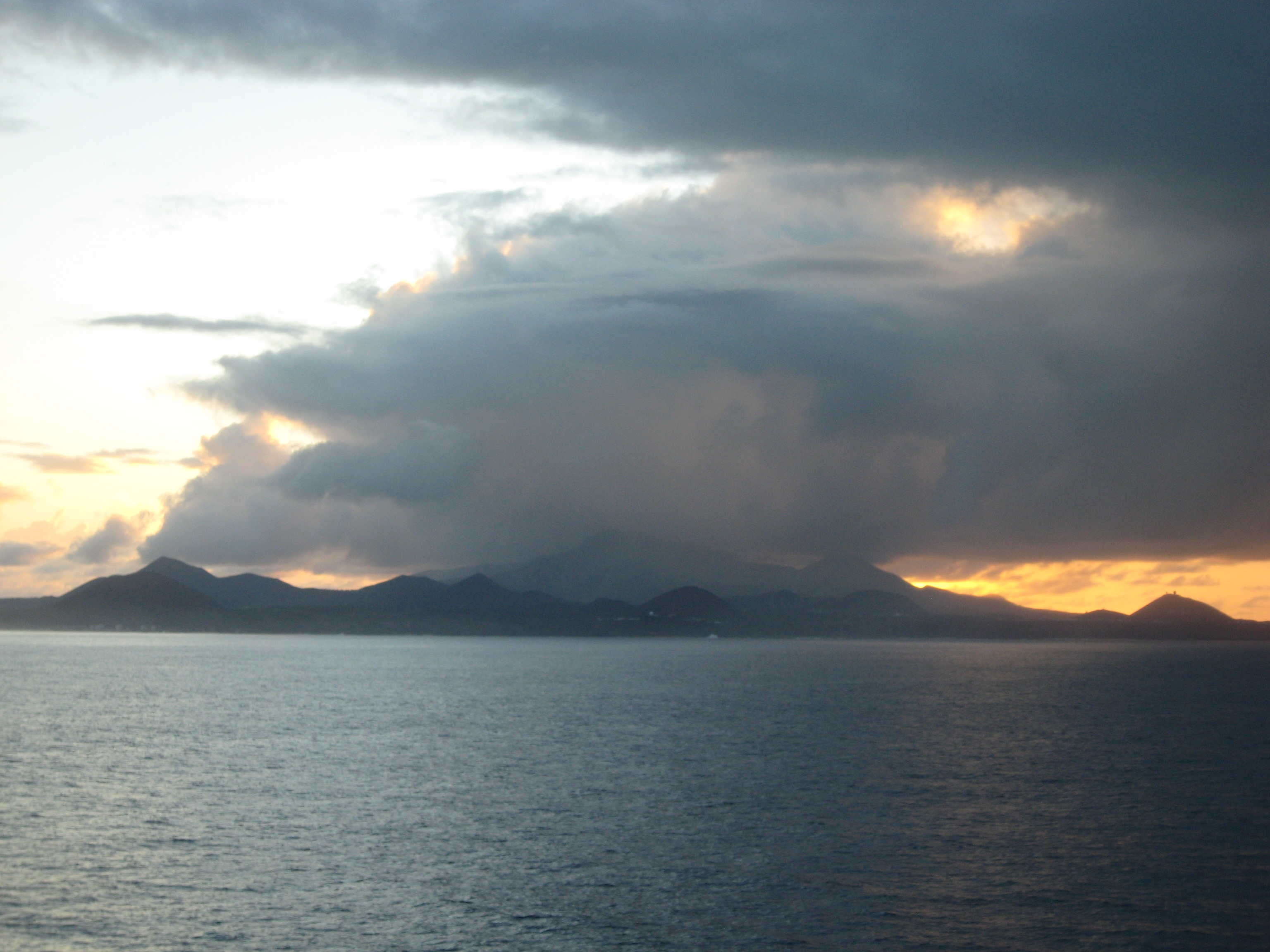
- Court: House of Lords
- Full case name: Lawson v Serco Ltd, Botham v Ministry of Defence, Crofts v Veta Ltd
- Citation: [2006] UKHL 3

Keywords
- Conflict of laws, employment

Lawson v Serco Ltd [2006] UKHL 3 is a UK labour law case, concerning the test for when workers are covered by employment rights when they work abroad.

== Facts ==
Lawson v Serco Ltd involved three joined appeals, where the question was whether the claimants could bring cases for unfair dismissal in the UK within the Employment Rights Act 1996, given that they worked part of their time abroad. However the ERA 1996 had been amended to exclude any reference to territorial scope, and thus left the issue to the courts. The employers were arguing that claims could not be brought because the work was performed outside the UK.

Lawson worked for Serco Ltd as a security guard on Ascension Island. He was an RAF policeman before. He resigned claiming constructive dismissal. Botham worked for the Ministry of Defence as a youth worker, based in the UK, but performing various jobs in German establishments. He was dismissed for gross misconduct, but claimed this was unfair. Crofts and the other claimants worked for Veta Ltd, a Hong Kong company, as pilots. They were based in the UK under a permanent basings policy. Veta Ltd was a wholly owned subsidiary of Cathay Pacific and both companies were based in Hong Kong.

In Lawson the Court of Appeal had held that ERA 1996 section 94 had not applied to Lawson or Botham, because all services were performed by the employees abroad. This was followed by the EAT and Court of Appeal in Botham so that he was not entitled to UK rights either. In Crofts another Court of Appeal, with Lord Phillips MR dissenting, held that ERA 1996 section 94 was applicable to Crofts since under the basings policy he was based in the UK.

== Judgment ==
The House of Lords held that Mr Lawson, Botham and Crofts were probably all entitled to make their claims in the UK, though the cases of Lawson and Botham had to be remitted to tribunal to determine the merits. Lord Hoffmann held that rights were a matter of construction, and it was mistaken to try to formulate an ancillary rule of territorial scope which must then be interpreted and applied, like ERA 1996 section 196 had been. But it was not a matter of discretion, and various principles could be set out.

5. ... Thus in Lawson and Botham, employer and employee both had close connections with Great Britain but all the services were performed abroad. In Crofts the employer was foreign but the employee was resident in Great Britain and although his services were peripatetic, they were based in Great Britain...

9. ... it was submitted that Parliament must have intended to widen the territorial scope of the various provisions to which section 196 had applied. Counsel said that support for this argument could be found in the brief statement of the Minister of State, Department of Trade and Industry (Mr Ian McCartney) when recommending the repeal of section 196 to the House of Commons: see Hansard (HC Debates) 26 July 1999, cols 31-32. It is no criticism of Mr McCartney's moment at the despatch box to say that I have not found his remarks particularly helpful in dealing with problems which he is unlikely to have had in mind... Parliament was content to accept the application of established principles of construction to the substantive rights conferred by the Act, whatever the consequences might be.’

14. ... insofar as section 196(3) prevented rights falling within the Directive from being enjoyed by employees who ordinarily worked outside Great Britain but were temporarily posted here, its repeal was intended to allow the courts to give effect to the Directive by interpreting the relevant substantive provisions as applicable to posted workers. To that extent, the repeal was intended to widen the territorial scope of those provisions... it may be said that by including only the “mandatory nucleus” in the Posted Workers Directive, the European Union has recognised that other rights might legitimately be given a different territorial application. But uniformity of application would certainly be desirable in the interests of simplicity.

23. ... Of course this question should be decided according to established principles of construction, giving effect to what Parliament may reasonably be supposed to have intended and attributing to Parliament a rational scheme. But this involves the application of principles, not the invention of supplementary rules...

24. On the other hand, the fact that we are dealing in principles and not rules does not mean that the decision as to whether section 94(1) applies (and therefore, whether the Employment Tribunal has jurisdiction) is an exercise of discretion. The section either applies to the employment relationship in question or it does not and, as I shall explain later, I think that is a question of law, although involving judgment in the application of the law to the facts....

[Lord Hoffmann referred to Carver v Saudi Arabian Airlines [1999] ICR 991, where a lady could not claim unfair dismissal because her contract was originally contemplating her being in Jeddah, even though she moved around and ended up working in London. Lord Hoffmann said this would be decided differently now.]

27. Since 1971 there has been a radical change in the attitude of Parliament and the courts to the employment relationship and I think that the application of section 94(1) should now depend upon whether the employee was working in Great Britain at the time of his dismissal, rather than upon what was contemplated at the time, perhaps many years earlier, when the contract was made...

29. As I said earlier, I think that we are today more concerned with how the contract was in fact being operated at the time of the dismissal than with the terms of the original contract. But the common sense of treating the base of a peripatetic employee as, for the purposes of the statute, his place of employment, remains valid. It was applied by the Court of Appeal to an airline pilot in Todd v British Midland Airways Ltd [1978] ICR 959, where Lord Denning MR said, at p 964:

‘A man's base is the place where he should be regarded as ordinarily working, even though he may spend days, weeks or months working overseas. I would only make this suggestion. I do not think that the terms of the contract help much in these cases. As a rule, there is no term in the contract about exactly where he is to work. You have to go by the conduct of the parties and the way they have been operating the contract. You have to find at the material time where the man is based.’

30. Lord Denning's opinion was rejected as a misguided obiter dictum by the Court of Appeal in Carver's case and it is true that the language of section 196 and the authorities such as Wilson's case insisted upon more attention being paid to the express or implied terms of the contract. But now that section 196 has been repealed, I think that Lord Denning provides the most helpful guidance.

31. Like the majority in the Court of Appeal, I think that Lord Denning's approach in Todd v British Midland Airways Ltd points the way to the answer in Crofts v Veta Ltd.... Unless, like Lord Phillips of Worth Matravers MR, one regards airline pilots as the flying Dutchmen of labour law, condemned to fly without any jurisdiction in which they can seek redress, I think there is no sensible alternative to asking where they are based. And the same is true of other peripatetic employees...

35. The problem of what I might call the expatriate employees is rather more difficult. The concept of a base, which is useful to locate the workplace of a peripatetic employee, provides no help in the case of an expatriate employee. The Ministry of Defence accepts that Mr Botham fell within the scope of section 94(1), but his base was the base and the base was in Germany.

36. The circumstances would have to be unusual for an employee who works and is based abroad to come within the scope of British labour legislation. But I think that there are some who do. I hesitate to describe such cases as coming within an exception or exceptions to the general rule because that suggests a definition more precise than can be imposed upon the many possible combinations of factors, some of which may be unforeseen. Mr Crow submitted that in principle the test was whether, despite the workplace being abroad, there are other relevant factors so powerful that the employment relationship has a closer connection with Great Britain than with the foreign country where the employee works. This may well be a correct description of the cases in which section 94(1) can exceptionally apply to an employee who works outside Great Britain, but like many accurate statements, it is framed in terms too general to be of practical help. I would also not wish to burden tribunals with inquiry into the systems of labour law of other countries. In my view one should go further and try, without drafting a definition, to identify the characteristics which such exceptional cases will ordinarily have.

37. First, I think that it would be very unlikely that someone working abroad would be within the scope of section 94(1) unless he was working for an employer based in Great Britain. But that would not be enough. Many companies based in Great Britain also carry on business in other countries and employment in those businesses will not attract British law merely on account of British ownership. The fact that the employee also happens to be British or even that he was recruited in Britain, so that the relationship was "rooted and forged" in this country, should not in itself be sufficient to take the case out of the general rule that the place of employment is decisive. Something more is necessary.

38. Something more may be provided by the fact that the employee is posted abroad by a British employer for the purposes of a business carried on in Great Britain. He is not working for a business conducted in a foreign country which belongs to British owners or is a branch of a British business, but as representative of a business conducted at home. I have in mind, for example, a foreign correspondent on the staff of a British newspaper, who is posted to Rome or Peking and may remain for years living in Italy or China but remains nevertheless a permanent employee of the newspaper who could be posted to some other country. He would in my opinion fall within the scope of section 94(1). The distinction is illustrated by Financial Times Ltd v Bishop [2003] UKEAT 0147, a decision of the Employment Appeal Tribunal delivered by Judge Burke QC. Mr Bishop was originally a sales executive working for the Financial Times in London. At the time of his dismissal in 2002 he had been working for three years in San Francisco selling advertising space. The Employment Tribunal accepted jurisdiction on the ground that under European rules it had personal jurisdiction over the Financial Times: see article 19 of Regulation EC 44/2001. But that was not a sufficient ground: the Regulation assumes that the employee has a claim to enforce, whereas the question was whether section 94(1) gave Mr Bishop a substantive claim. Having set aside this decision, the EAT was in my opinion right in saying that the findings of fact were inadequate to enable it to give its own decision. The question was whether Mr Bishop was selling advertising space in San Francisco as a part of the business which the Financial Times conducted in London or whether he was working for a business which the Financial Times or an associated company was conducting in the United States: for example, by selling advertising in the Financial Times American edition. In the latter case, section 94 would not in my view apply. (Compare Jackson v Ghost Ltd [2003] IRLR 824, which was a clear case of employment in a foreign business).

39. Another example is an expatriate employee of a British employer who is operating within what amounts for practical purposes to an extra-territorial British enclave in a foreign country. This was the position of Mr Botham working in a military base in Germany. And I think, although the case is not quite so strong, that the same is true of Mr Lawson at the RAF base on Ascension Island. While it is true that Mr Lawson was there in a support role, employed by a private firm to provide security on the base, I think it would be unrealistic to regard him as having taken up employment in a foreign community in the same way as if Serco Ltd were providing security services for a hospital in Berlin. I have no doubt that Bryant v Foreign and Commonwealth Office [2003] UKEAT 174, in which it was held that section 94(1) did not apply to a British national locally engaged to work in the British Embassy in Rome, was rightly decided. But on Ascension there was no local community. In practice, as opposed to constitutional theory, the base was a British outpost in the South Atlantic. Although there was a local system of law, the connection between the employment relationship and the United Kingdom were overwhelmingly stronger.

40. I have given two examples of cases in which section 94(1) may apply to an expatriate employee: the employee posted abroad to work for a business conducted in Britain and the employee working in a political or social British enclave abroad. I do not say that there may not be others, but I have not been able to think of any and they would have to have equally strong connections with Great Britain and British employment law. For the purposes of these two appeals, the second of these examples is sufficient. It leads to the conclusion that the appeals of both Mr Lawson and Mr Botham should be allowed.

Double claiming

41. Finally I should note that in the case of expatriate employees, it is quite possible that they will be entitled to make claims under both the local law and section 94(1). For example, the foreign correspondent living in Rome would be entitled to rights in Italian law under the Posted Workers Directive and although the Directive does not extend to claims for unfair dismissal, Italian domestic law may nevertheless provide for them. Obviously there cannot be double recovery and any compensation paid under the foreign system would have to be taken into account by an Employment Tribunal.

Lord Woolf, Lord Rodger, Lord Walker, and Baroness Hale concurred.

== See also ==
- UK labour law
