= Administration of Justice Act 1969 =

Act of the Parliament of the United Kingdom

Administration of Justice Act 1969 (Note: Section 36(1).)
- Act of Parliament
- Parliament of the United Kingdom
- Long title: An Act to increase the jurisdiction of county courts and to amend the County Courts Act 1959; to make further provision for appeals from the High Court (whether in England and Wales or in Northern Ireland) to the House of Lords; to enable wills and codicils to be made for mentally disordered persons; to make provision for interim payments to be made where proceedings are pending, and for conferring powers to be exercisable by the court before the commencement of an action, and to make further provision with respect to interest on damages; to enable any jurisdiction of the High Court to be assigned to two or more Divisions concurrently; to enable the Appeal Tribunals under the Patents Act 1949 and the Registered Designs Act 1949 to consist of two or more judges; to change the title and qualification of clerks to registrars of the Chancery Division; to make further provision with respect to miscellaneous matters, that is to say, certain employments in the offices of the Supreme Court, records of grants of probate and grants of administration and the making of second and subsequent grants, admission as a public notary, pension rights and related matters in connection with certain judicial offices, and the stipend and fees of the Chancellor of the County Palatine of Durham; to extend the legislative power of the Parliament of Northern Ireland with respect to grand juries and indictments; and for purposes connected with the matters aforesaid.
- Citation: 1969 c. 58
- Territorial extent: England and Wales (Note: Section 36(2)–(4).)

Dates
- Royal assent: 22 October 1969
- Commencement: 1 December 1969; 1 January 1970 (Note: The Administration of Justice Act 1969 (Commencement No. 1) Order 1969 (SI 1969/1607).); 26 March 1970 (Note: The Administration of Justice Act 1969 (Commencement No. 2) Order 1970 (SI 1970/672).)
Other legislation
Amends	Law Reform (Miscellaneous Provisions) Act 1934
Amended by	Courts Act 1971; Solicitors Act 1974; Administration of Justice Act 1977; Judicature (Northern Ireland) Act 1978; Statute Law (Repeals) Act 1978; Judicial Pensions Act 1981; Senior Courts Act 1981; Mental Health Act 1983; County Courts Act 1984; Statute Law (Repeals) Act 2004; Constitutional Reform Act 2005; Tribunals, Courts and Enforcement Act 2007; Criminal Justice and Courts Act 2015

Status: Amended

Text of statute as originally enacted

Revised text of statute as amended

Text of the Administration of Justice Act 1969 as in force today (including any amendments) within the United Kingdom, from legislation.gov.uk.

The Administration of Justice Act 1969 (c. 31) is an act of the Parliament of the United Kingdom. It has been substantially amended and partially repealed since it was enacted.

Part I of the act related to the county courts and has been completely repealed.

Part II is still in force, as amended, and provides the procedure for leapfrog appeals (that is, appeals directly from the High Court to the Supreme Court).

Part III related to wills made by people under a mental disability. It has been repealed.

Part IV, which is still partially in force, contains various miscellaneous provisions.

== See also ==
- Administration of Justice Act
