= Kenneth Osborne, Lord Osborne =

The Right Honourable Lord Osborne

Senator of the College of Justice
- In office 1990 – 9 May 2011

Personal details
- Born: Kenneth Hilton Osborne; 9 July 1937 (age 89)
- Spouse: Clare Lewis
- Education: University of Edinburgh
- Profession: Advocate

Kenneth Hilton Osborne, Lord Osborne PC was a Senator of the College of Justice, a judge of the Supreme Courts of Scotland, sitting in the High Court of Justiciary and the Inner House of the Court of Session. Appointed in 1990, he was Scotland's longest-serving judge.

== Early life ==
Osborne was educated at Larchfield School in Helensburgh and Merchiston Castle School, Edinburgh, before studying at the University of Edinburgh (M.A., LL.B.).

== Legal career ==
Osborne was admitted to the Faculty of Advocates in 1962, and served as Standing Junior Counsel to the Ministry of Defence from 1974 to 1976, working with the Navy. He took silk in 1976, and served as an Advocate Depute from 1982 to 1984. He served on VAT Tribunals, Medical Appeal Tribunals and the Disciplinary Committee of the Potato Marketing Board. He was a member of the Lands Tribunal for Scotland from 1985 to 1987 and Chairman of the Local Government Boundary Commission for Scotland from 1990 to 2000.

He was appointed a Senator of the College of Justice, a judge of the High Court of Justiciary and Court of Session, Scotland's Supreme Courts, in 1990, taking the judicial title, Lord Osborne. He was appointed to the Inner House in 2001, becoming a member of the Privy Council. He retired in 2011.

== Personal life ==
Lord Osborne married Clare Lewis in 1964, with whom he has a son and daughter. His interests include skiing, fishing, gardening, music and cooking, and he is a member of the New Club. He maintains homes in Edinburgh and in Kirriemuir, Angus.

== See also ==
- List of Senators of the College of Justice
