= Nicholas Blake (judge) =

British judge

Sir Nicholas Blake
- Royal coat of arms of the United Kingdom

High Court Judge
- In office 2007–2017

Personal details
- Born: 21 June 1949 (age 77)
- Education: Magdalene College, Cambridge

Sir Nicholas John Gorrod Blake (born 21 June 1949), styled The Hon. Mr Justice Blake, is a retired judge of the High Court of England and Wales.

He was educated at Cranleigh School and Magdalene College, Cambridge.

He was called to the bar at Middle Temple in 1974 and became a bencher there in 2002. He was made a QC in 1994, specialising in immigration, asylum and free movement and human rights law. He was a founding member of Matrix Chambers and first chair of its management committee. He was appointed as a special advocate and as a Deputy High Court judge in 2002, and judge of the High Court of Justice (Queen's Bench Division) since 2007. From 2004 to 2013 he was a Trustee of the National Portrait Gallery.

From 2010 to 2013 he was President of the newly established Upper Tribunal (Immigration and Asylum Chamber). He represented the judiciary of England and Wales on the International Association of Judges.

Blake retired from the bench on 3 October 2017.

In 2026, he was appointed a judge of the Court of Appeal of Brunei.
