= Leapfrog appeal =

Judicial process

In legal procedure, a leapfrog appeal is a special and relatively rare form of appeal in which a case is appealed directly from a lower court to a higher court, skipping an intermediate appellate court. For example, in England & Wales, an appeal from the High Court to the Supreme Court, thereby skipping the Court of Appeal.

== England and Wales ==
A leapfrog appeal may be brought from the High Court to the Supreme Court (or previously the House of Lords), thereby skipping the Court of Appeal.

The procedure is governed by Part II of the Administration of Justice Act 1969 as amended. In summary, if the High Court judge considers that the relevant conditions are met, and that the case is suitable for a leapfrog appeal, then they may grant a certificate to that effect (section 12(1) of the Act). If a certificate is granted, any of the parties to the proceedings may apply to the Supreme Court for leave to make a leapfrog appeal, which if granted enables the leapfrog appeal to take place (section 13).

The High Court judge may not grant a certificate unless the "relevant conditions" in section 12(3), or the "alternative conditions" in section 12(3A) are met. The "relevant conditions in section 12(3) are that:

a point of law of general public importance is involved in that decision and that that point of law either—

(a) relates wholly or mainly to the construction of an enactment or of a statutory instrument, and has been fully argued in the proceedings and fully considered in the judgment of the judge in the proceedings, or

(b) is one in respect of which the judge is bound by a decision of the Court of Appeal or of the Supreme Court in previous proceedings, and was fully considered in the judgments given by the Court of Appeal or the Supreme Court (as the case may be) in those previous proceedings.

The "alternative conditions" in section 12(3A) are that:

a point of law of general public importance is involved in the decision and that—

(a) the proceedings entail a decision relating to a matter of national importance or consideration of such a matter,

(b) the result of the proceedings is so significant (whether considered on its own or together with other proceedings or likely proceedings) that, in the opinion of the judge, a hearing by the Supreme Court is justified, or

(c) the judge is satisfied that the benefits of earlier consideration by the Supreme Court outweigh the benefits of consideration by the Court of Appeal.

Key contemporary examples include the leapfrog appeals in the Miller case, and the Cherry and Miller joint cases, both major judicial review appeals heard by the Supreme Court en banc.

== Hong Kong ==
Under the Hong Kong Court of Final Appeal Ordinance, certain civil appeals from the Court of First Instance may be made directly to the Court of Final Appeal, skipping the Court of Appeal.

== Ireland ==
Article 35.5.4 of the Constitution of Ireland provides for a leapfrog appeal from the High Court to the Supreme Court, thereby skipping the Court of Appeal.

Under Article 35.5.4, a leapfrog appeal may be brought if the Supreme Court is satisfied that there are exceptional circumstances warranting a direct appeal to it, and either the decision of the High Court involves a matter of general public importance, or the interests of justice require.

== United States ==
The US equivalent of a leapfrog appeal is certiorari before judgment, a procedure under which the Supreme Court is asked to immediately review the decision of a district court without an appeal having been decided by a court of appeals, for the purpose of expediting the proceedings and obtaining a final decision.
