= Simon Brown, Baron Brown of Eaton-under-Heywood =

British judge (1937–2023)

The Right Honourable The Lord Brown of Eaton-under-Heywood PC
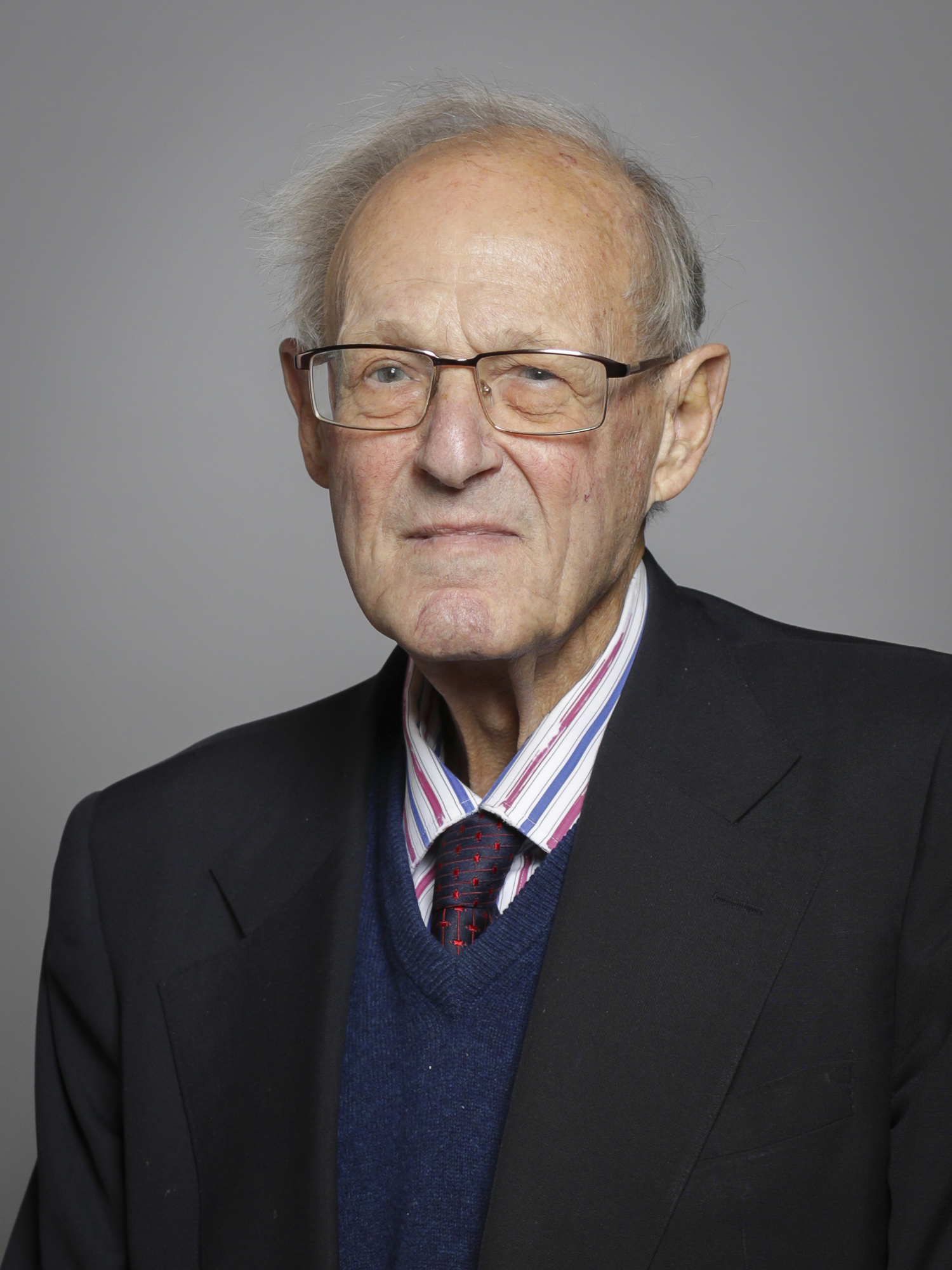
- Official portrait, 2019

Justice of the Supreme Court of the United Kingdom (Note: Lord of Appeal in Ordinary until 30 September 2009)
- In office 13 January 2004 – 9 April 2012
- Nominated by: Jack Straw
- Appointed by: Elizabeth II
- Preceded by: The Lord Hobhouse of Woodborough
- Succeeded by: The Lord Carnwath of Notting Hill

Member of the House of Lords
- Lord Temporal
- Lord of Appeal in Ordinary; 13 January 2004 – 19 June 2023

Lord Justice of Appeal
- In office 1992–2004

High Court Judge
- In office 1984–1992

Personal details
- Born: Simon Denis Brown; 9 April 1937 Sheffield, England
- Died: 7 July 2023 (aged 86)
- Spouse(s): Jennifer Buddicom, Lady Brown (m. 1963)
- Children: 3
- Education: Worcester College, Oxford
- Profession: Barrister; judge

Military service
- Branch/service: British Army
- Years of service: 1955–1957
- Rank: Lieutenant
- Unit: Royal Artillery

Simon Denis Brown, Baron Brown of Eaton-under-Heywood, PC (9 April 1937 – 7 July 2023) was a British barrister and judge. He was a Law Lord, then a Justice of the Supreme Court of the United Kingdom from 2009 to 2012.

== Early life ==
The son of Denis Baer Brown and Edna Elizabeth (Abrahams) Brown, Simon Brown was born in 1937 into a middle class Jewish family from Sheffield. His family moved to Nottinghamshire when he was one year old. His father, a jeweller, fought in Burma during the Second World War. He received his formal education at Stowe School from 1950 to 1955, where he acquired a passion for history, winning the school's top history prize.

Brown had passed his entrance exam to read history at Worcester College, Oxford but he was first required to undertake mandatory National Service (1955–1957). Brown attended eight weeks basic training with the Royal Artillery near Oswestry, followed by officer training near Aldershot, and was commissioned on 24 March 1956 as a second lieutenant, temporarily stationed in Essex.

The following month, Brown embarked for Malta but was diverted to Cyprus at the outbreak of hostilities in Suez. Preparations for engagement in Suez never materialised as British forces became absorbed into conflict against Greek Cypriot right-wing nationalist guerrilla organisation (EOKA) fighting for the unification of Cyprus and Greece.

Brown returned to Essex in the Spring of 1957 and was transferred to the Regular Army Reserves of Officers on 29 July 1957, thereby ending his active service. He decided to take his first long summer vacation in New York, stacking shelves in the basement of a 5th Avenue department store in the day and mixing with the "great and the good" of New York in the evenings.

At the end of the summer break, Brown joined the intake of 1957 to Oxford, which was dominated by students coming out of two years of national service with little or no thought of academic study. Brown had come up to Oxford to read history but by May 1958, he changed to law with his sights set on the Middle Temple. Term time for Brown was devoted to the study of law but the long summer vacations were given over to backpacking around post-war Europe, or earning money as a tour-guide for wealthy (mostly trans-Atlantic) travellers.

After three years, Brown graduated from Oxford, (Note: he was elected an honorary fellow in 1993.) and was called to the bar by the Middle Temple in February 1961.

== Legal career ==
After being called to the bar, Brown did his pupillage in Crown Office Row, with Owen Stable as his pupil master. He eventually became a tenant of 2 Garden Court (now 39 Essex Chambers), where he shared a room with William Macpherson.

From 1979 to 1984, he was a Recorder and First Junior Treasury Counsel (Common Law). From 1980, he was a Master of the Bench of the Middle Temple.

=== Judicial career ===
Brown was appointed a High Court Judge in 1984 and assigned to the Queen's Bench Division, receiving a knighthood on his appointment. He became a Lord Justice of Appeal, a judge of the Court of Appeal of England and Wales, in 1992 and was made a Privy Counsellor in the same year. He was Vice-President of the Civil Division from 2001 to 2003.

On 13 January 2004, he was appointed a Lord of Appeal in Ordinary, and therefore became a life peer with the title Baron Brown of Eaton-under-Heywood, of Eaton-under-Heywood in the County of Shropshire, sitting as a crossbencher. He and nine other Lords of Appeal in Ordinary became Justices of the Supreme Court upon that body's inauguration on 1 October 2009. He retired from the House of Lords on 19 June 2023.

He served as Visitor of St Hugh's College, Oxford from 2011 until his death.

== Personal life and death ==
Brown was married to Jennifer Buddicom from 31 May 1963 until his death. They had two sons and one daughter (Benedict, Daniel and Abigail) and five grandchildren.

Lord Brown died on 7 July 2023, at the age of 86.
