= John Dyson, Lord Dyson =

British judge

The Right Honourable Lord Dyson
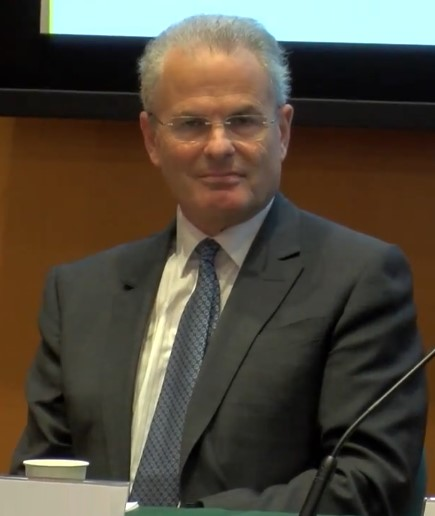
- Lord Dyson in 2013

Master of the Rolls Head of Civil Justice
- In office 1 October 2012 – 2 October 2016
- Appointed by: Elizabeth II
- Preceded by: The Lord Neuberger of Abbotsbury
- Succeeded by: Sir Terence Etherton

Justice of the Supreme Court of the United Kingdom
- In office 12 April 2010 – 1 October 2012
- Nominated by: Jack Straw
- Appointed by: Elizabeth II
- Preceded by: The Lord Neuberger of Abbotsbury
- Succeeded by: Lord Hughes of Ombersley

Lord Justice of Appeal
- In office 11 January 2001 – 12 April 2010
- Preceded by: Sir Martin Nourse

High Court Judge
- In office 30 March 1993 – 11 January 2001

Personal details
- Born: John Anthony Dyson; 31 July 1943 (age 83) Yorkshire, England
- Spouse: Jacqueline Levy (m. 1970)
- Children: 2
- Education: Wadham College, Oxford
- Occupation: Judge
- Profession: Barrister

Johnathan Anthony Dyson, Lord Dyson, PC (born 31 July 1943) is a former British judge and barrister. He was Master of the Rolls and Head of Civil Justice, the second most senior judge in England and Wales, from 2012 to 2016, and a Justice of the Supreme Court of the United Kingdom from 2010 to 2012.

== Early life ==
Dyson has an East European Jewish heritage. His mother was Hungarian, born in Bulgaria, and his paternal grandparents Lithuanian. He was born in Yorkshire and educated at Leeds Grammar School, entering their Junior School in 1951 when 8 years old. He then studied classics at Wadham College, Oxford where he won an Open Scholarship. He was called to the Bar at the Middle Temple in 1968.

== Legal career ==
Dyson took silk in 1982 and was appointed a Recorder in 1986. He became a bencher of Middle Temple Inn in 1990. He was the head of 39 Essex Chambers from 1986 to 1993.

He was appointed a judge of the High Court of Justice on 30 March 1993, and sat in the Queen's Bench Division. He was knighted, as is customary upon this appointment, becoming Sir John Dyson. In 1994, he was appointed chairman of the Equal Treatment Advisory Committee of the Judicial College. Put in charge of the Official Referees’ Court, he renamed it the Technology and Construction Court, a specialist part of the Queen's Bench Division, and became its first Presiding Judge.

On 11 January 2001, Dyson was appointed a Lord Justice of Appeal, a judge of the Court of Appeal of England and Wales, in succession to Lord Justice Nourse, and was appointed to the Privy Council. In 2003, he was promoted to Deputy Head of Civil Justice.

Dyson was appointed a Justice of the Supreme Court of the United Kingdom on 12 April 2010, and was sworn in on 19 April. His appointment brought the Supreme Court up to full strength by filling a vacancy that had existed since the court began work in October 2009.

It was announced in December 2010 that, by Royal Warrant, all members of the Supreme Court, even if they did not hold a peerage, were entitled to the judicial courtesy title of "Lord" for life. Dyson was the first Supreme Court Justice to whom this applied, and he gained the courtesy title Lord Dyson. In his survey of the early years of the Supreme Court, Professor Alan Paterson described Lord Dyson as the most effective “task leader” in bringing other judges to his viewpoint.

Dyson was appointed Master of the Rolls from 1 October 2012 — this was widely expected following the announcement of Neuberger's appointment as President of the Supreme Court of the United Kingdom in July 2012.

According to Standpoint, he was said to have previously come a "close second" to Lord Neuberger of Abbotsbury to succeed Lord Clarke of Stone-cum-Ebony as Master of the Rolls in 2009.

From 2012 to 2016, he was Chairman of the Magna Carta Trust and of the Advisory Council on National Records and Archives. He was chairman of the legal group of the British Friends of the Hebrew University.

Dyson retired and was replaced by Sir Terence Etherton as Master of the Rolls in October 2016. He was Treasurer of Middle Temple in 2017.

In 2018, Lord Dyson published a selection of his lectures and speeches, Justice, Continuity and Change.

In September 2019, Lord Dyson published his autobiography, A Judge's Journey. In a study published in 2024, he is critical of Lord Hope of Craighead in publishing Diaries revealing Lord Hope's account of judicial panel deliberations and confidential conversations between judges.

Since 2016 he has practised as an arbitrator and mediator at 39 Essex Chambers. He is on the List of Arbitrators of the Court of Arbitration for Sport (CAS) and the Judicial Panels of Sports Resolution, the Football Association and the Premier League. Since his retirement, he has been involved in many sports cases.

In 2019, he chaired the panel which imposed sanctions on Saracens for breach of the Premier Rugby League Salary Cap Regulations. In 2024 and 2025, he sat on the panel which decided various challenges by Manchester City FC to the Premier League APT Rules. In 2024, he chaired the CAS Panel which dismissed the Russian Olympic Committee's appeal against its suspension from the Paris Olympic Games.

In 2020, he chaired the Financial Reporting Council's Disciplinary Panel which imposed a then-record fine on Deloitte for auditing failures in relation to the accounts of Autonomy Corporation plc.

In 2021, Lord Dyson was appointed to review Martin Bashir’s BBC Panorama interview with Diana, Princess of Wales and the role of the BBC. Lord Dyson’s report found that Bashir had procured the interview by deceit and the BBC’s internal investigation was “woefully ineffective”. Dyson's report led to the resignation of the Director General, Tony Hall, Baron Hall of Birkenhead, as Chairman of the National Gallery.

== Affiliations ==
In 2013, Dyson was awarded honorary degrees of LLD by Essex University and University College, London. In 2014, he was awarded an honorary degree of LLD by Leeds University. Dyson is a visiting professor of law at Queen Mary, London and University College, London. He is an honorary fellow of Wadham College, Oxford and the Hebrew University, Jerusalem. In 2025 he was appointed an honorary fellow of the American College of Trial Lawyers.

== Personal life ==
He has been married to Jacqueline Levy since 1970. They have a daughter and a son. He has said that being Jewish is a core part of his identity.

Coat of arms of John Dyson, Lord Dyson
| Notes Displayed on a wall at the Middle Temple. Based on a sketch by his grandson Justin, involving "white roses of Yorkshire, stars of David, piano keys and mountains". |

Legal offices
| Preceded by The Lord Neuberger of Abbotsbury | Master of the Rolls; 2012–2016 | Succeeded by Sir Terence Etherton |
