= List of judgments of the Supreme Court of the United Kingdom delivered in 2013 =

This is a list of the 81 judgments given by the Supreme Court of the United Kingdom in the year 2013. They are ordered by neutral citation.

The table lists judgments made by the court and the opinions of the judges in each case. Judges are treated as having concurred in another's judgment when they either formally attach themselves to the judgment of another or speak only to acknowledge their concurrence with one or more judges. Any judgment which reaches a conclusion that differs from the majority on one or more major points of the appeal has been treated as dissent.

All dates are for 2013 unless expressly stated otherwise.

== 2013 case summaries ==
Unless otherwise noted, cases were heard by a panel of 5 judges.

Cases involving Scots law are highlighted in orange. Cases involving Northern Irish law are highlighted in green.

Case name	Citation	Date	Legal subject	Summary of decision
R (Prudential plc) v Special Commissioner of Income Tax	[2013] UKSC 1	23 January 2013	Legal advice privilege	
Zakrzewski v The Regional Court in Lodz, Poland	[2013] UKSC 2	23 January 2013	European arrest warrant	
Lloyds TSB Foundation for Scotland v Lloyds Banking Group Plc	[2013] UKSC 3	23 January 2013	Deed law	
B (Algeria) v Secretary of State for the Home Department	[2013] UKSC 4	30 January 2013	Sentencing	
VTB Capital plc v Nutritek International Corp	[2013] UKSC 5	6 February 2013	Company law	
O'Brien v Ministry of Justice (Formerly the Department for Constitutional Affairs)	[2013] UKSC 6	6 February 2013	Labour law	
Re Digital Satellite Warranty Cover Ltd v Financial Services Authority	[2013] UKSC 7	13 February 2013	Company law	
Re L and B (Children)	[2013] UKSC 8	20 February 2013	Family law	
Re J (Children)	[2013] UKSC 9	20 February 2013	Family law	
Sharif v The London Borough of Camden	[2013] UKSC 10	20 February 2013	Homelessness law	
The Financial Services Authority v Sinaloa Gold plc	[2013] UKSC 11	27 February 2013	Financial Services and Markets Act 2000	
Davies v The Scottish Commission for the Regulation of Care	[2013] UKSC 12	27 February 2013	Care law	
Joint Administrators of Heritable Bank plc v The Winding-Up Board of Landsbanki Islands HF	[2013] UKSC 13	27 February 2013	Insolvency law	
Daejan Investments Ltd v Benson	[2013] UKSC 14	6 March 2013	Landlord-tenant law	
Her Majesty's Revenue and Customs v Aimia Coalition Loyalty UK Ltd (No 1)	[2013] UKSC 15	13 March 2013	Tax law	
Schütz (UK) Ltd v Werit (UK) Ltd	[2013] UKSC 16	13 March 2013	Intellectual property law	
Hayes v Willoughby	[2013] UKSC 17	20 March 2013	Protection from Harassment Act 1997	
Public Relations Consultants Association Ltd v The Newspaper Licensing Agency Ltd	[2013] UKSC 18	17 April 2013	Copyright law	
Jones (by Caldwell) v First Tier Tribunal and Criminal Injuries Compensation Authority	[2013] UKSC 19	17 April 2013	Criminal Injuries Compensation Authority	
Barts and the London NHS Trust v Verma	[2013] UKSC 20	24 April 2013	Labour law	
Uprichard v Scottish Ministers	[2013] UKSC 21	24 April 2013	Planning law	
Salvesen v Riddell	[2013] UKSC 22	24 April 2013	Scottish devolution	
R (Faulkner) v Secretary of State for Justice	[2013] UKSC 23	1 May 2013	Criminal law	
WHA Ltd v Her Majesty's Revenue and Customs	[2013] UKSC 24	1 May 2013	Tax law	
R (ClientEarth) v Secretary of State for the Environment, Food and Rural Affairs	[2013] UKSC 25	1 May 2013	Environmental law	
Futter v The Commissioners for Her Majesty's Revenue and Customs	[2013] UKSC 26	9 May 2013	Trust law	
SL v Westminster City Council	[2013] UKSC 27	9 May 2013	Judicial review; National Assistance Act 1948	
BNY Corporate Trustee Services Ltd v Neuberger Berman Europe Ltd	[2013] UKSC 28	9 May 2013	Insolvency law	
The President of the Methodist Conference v Preston	[2013] UKSC 29	15 May 2013	Labour law	
Commissioners for Her Majesty's Revenue and Customs v Marks and Spencer plc	[2013] UKSC 30	22 May 2013	Company law	
Vestergaard Frandsen v Bestnet Europe Ltd	[2013] UKSC 31	22 May 2013	Breach of confidence	
Public Prosecution Service of Northern Ireland v Elliott	[2013] UKSC 32	22 May 2013	Policing and Crime Act 2009	
Re B (A Child)	[2013] UKSC 33	12 June 2013	Family law	
Prest v Petrodel Resources Ltd	[2013] UKSC 34	12 June 2013	Family law	
Ust-Kamenogorsk Hydropower Plant JSC v AES Ust-Kamenogorstk Hydropower Plant LLP	[2013] UKSC 35	12 June 2013	Jurisdiction	
O'Neill No 2 v Her Majesty's Advocate	[2013] UKSC 36	13 June 2013	Article 6, ECHR	
Apollo Engineering Ltd v James Scott Ltd	[2013] UKSC 37	13 June 2013	Jurisdiction	
Bank Mellat v Her Majesty's Treasury (No. 1)	[2013] UKSC 38	19 June 2013	Closed material procedures	
Bank Mellat v Her Majesty's Treasury (No. 2)	[2013] UKSC 39	19 June 2013	Closed material procedures	
Cusack v London Borough of Harrow	[2013] UKSC 40	19 June 2013	Highways Act 1980	
Smith v The Ministry of Defence	[2013] UKSC 41	19 June 2013	Jurisdiction; Article 2, ECHR; Negligence	
Her Majesty's Revenue and Customs v Aimia Coalition Loyalty UK Ltd (No. 2)	[2013] UKSC 42	20 June 2013	Tax law	
R v Brown	[2013] UKSC 43	26 June 2013	Criminal law of Northern Ireland	
Abela v Baadarani	[2013] UKSC 44	26 June 2013	Civil Procedure Rules	
North v Dumfries and Galloway Council	[2013] UKSC 45	26 June 2013	Labour law	
Virgin Atlantic Airways Ltd v Zodiac Seats UK Ltd	[2013] UKSC 46	3 July 2013	Intellectual property law	
R (Sturnham) v The Parole Board of England and Wales	[2013] UKSC 47	3 July 2013	Criminal law	
Kapri v The Lord Advocate representing The Government of the Republic of Albania	[2013] UKSC 48	10 July 2013	Extradition; Article 6, ECHR	
R (AA) v Secretary of State for the Home Department	[2013] UKSC 49	10 July 2013	Immigration law	
Benedetti v Sawiris	[2013] UKSC 50	17 July 2013	Unjust enrichment	
R (New London College Ltd) v Secretary of State for the Home Department	[2013] UKSC 51	17 July 2013	Immigration law	
Re Nortel Companies	[2013] UKSC 52	24 July 2013	Pensions Act 2004, insolvency law	
R (Modaresi) v Secretary of State for Health	[2013] UKSC 53	24 July 2013	Mental Health Act 1983	
Daejan Investments Ltd v Benson (No. 2)	[2013] UKSC 54	24 July 2013	Landlord-tenant law	
South Lanarkshire Council v The Scottish Information Commissioner	[2013] UKSC 55	29 July 2013	Freedom of information	
R v Hughes	[2013] UKSC 56	31 July 2013	Criminal law	
Teal Assurance Company Ltd v W R Berkley Insurance Ltd	[2013] UKSC 57	31 July 2013	Professional liability insurance	
McGraddie v McGraddie	[2013] UKSC 58	31 July 2013	Findings of fact	
Torfaen County Borough Council v Douglas Willis Ltd	[2013] UKSC 59	31 July 2013	Food Safety Act 1990	
Re A (Children)	[2013] UKSC 60	9 September 2013	Jurisdiction	
Osborn v The Parole Board	[2013] UKSC 61	9 October 2013	Article 5, ECHR	
Secretary of State for the Home Department v Al-Jedda	[2013] UKSC 62	9 October 2013	Immigration law	
McGeoch v The Lord President of the Council	[2013] UKSC 63	16 October 2013	Prisoner voting	
R v Gul	[2013] UKSC 64	23 October 2013	Terrorism Act 2000	
Szepietowski v The National Crime Agency	[2013] UKSC 65	23 October 2013	Proceeds of Crime Act 2002	
Woodland v Essex County Council	[2013] UKSC 66	23 October 2013	Tort law	A school was liable for the failure of a swimming instructor contractor to take care of children, even though pupils and parents have no contract with the school.
Aintree University Hospitals NHS Foundation Trust v James	[2013] UKSC 67	30 October 2013	Medical law	
R (Reilly) v Secretary of State for Work and Pensions	[2013] UKSC 68	30 October 2013	Jobseeker's Allowance	
Cotter v Commissioners For Her Majesty's Revenue & Customs	[2013] UKSC 69	6 November 2013	Tax law	
The Alexandros T	[2013] UKSC 70	6 November 2013	Jurisdiction; Shipping law	
Sakalis v Ministry of Justice, Lithuania	[2013] UKSC 71	20 November 2013	European Arrest Warrant	
Patel v Secretary of State for the Home Department	[2013] UKSC 72	20 November 2013	Immigration law	
Bull v Hall	[2013] UKSC 73	27 November 2013	Equality Act (Sexual Orientation) Regulations	
Zoumbas v Secretary of State for the Home Department	[2013] UKSC 74	27 November 2013	Immigration law	
Re KL (A Child)	[2013] UKSC 75	4 December 2013	Hague Convention on the Civil Aspects of International Child Abduction	
Re an application by Martin Corey for Judicial Review	[2013] UKSC 76	4 December 2013	Northern Irish criminal law	
R (Hodkin) v Registrar-General of Births, Deaths and Marriages	[2013] UKSC 77	11 December 2013	Family law	
R (Edwards) v Environment Agency (No. 2)	[2013] UKSC 78	11 December 2013	Costs	
G v Scottish Ministers	[2013] UKSC 79	18 December 2013	Mental Health (Care and Treatment) (Scotland) Act 2003	
West London Mental Health NHS Trust v Chhabra	[2013] UKSC 80	18 December 2013	Patient confidentiality; Labour law	
AA (Somalia) v Entry Clearance Officer (Addis Ababa)	[2013] UKSC 81	18 December 2013	Immigration law	

== 2013 opinions ==
Delivered a judgment (majority)	Concurred in the judgment of another justice (majority)	Delivered a judgment (dissenting)	Concurred in the judgment of another justice (dissent)	Did not participate in the decision

Case name	Citation	Argued	Decided	Neuberger of Abbotsbury	Hope of Craighead	Walker of Gestingthorpe	Hale of Richmond	Mance	Kerr of Tonaghmore	Clarke of Stone-cum-Ebony	Wilson of Culworth	Sumption	Reed	Carnwath of Notting Hill	Hughes of Ombersley	Toulson	Hodge
R (Prudential plc) v Special Commissioner of Income Tax	[2013] UKSC 1	5–7 November 2012	23 January
Zakrzewski v The Regional Court in Lodz, Poland	[2013] UKSC 2	6 December 2012	23 January
Lloyds TSB Foundation for Scotland v Lloyds Banking Group Plc	[2013] UKSC 3	27–28 November 2012	23 January
B (Algeria) v Secretary of State for the Home Department	[2013] UKSC 4	5 December 2012	30 January
VTB Capital plc v Nutritek International Corp	[2013] UKSC 5	12–14 November 2012	6 February
O'Brien v Ministry of Justice (Formerly the Department for Constitutional Affairs)	[2013] UKSC 6	21–22 November 2012	6 February
Re Digital Satellite Warranty Cover Limited v Financial Services Authority	[2013] UKSC 7	10–11 December 2012	13 February
Re L and B (Children)	[2013] UKSC 8	21 January	20 February
Re J (Children)	[2013] UKSC 9	17–18 December 2012	20 February
Sharif v The London Borough of Camden	[2013] UKSC 10	17 January	20 February
The Financial Services Authority v Sinaloa Gold plc	[2013] UKSC 11	12–13 December 2012	27 February
Davies v The Scottish Commission for the Regulation of Care	[2013] UKSC 12	30 January	27 February
Joint Administrators of Heritable Bank plc v The Winding-Up Board of Landsbanki Islands HF	[2013] UKSC 13	4–5 February	27 February
Daejan Investments Ltd v Benson	[2013] UKSC 14	4 December 2012	6 March
Her Majesty's Revenue and Customs v Aimia Coalition Loyalty UK Ltd (No 1)	[2013] UKSC 15	24–25 October 2012	13 March
Schütz (UK) Ltd v Werit (UK) Ltd	[2013] UKSC 16	15–16 January	13 March
Hayes v Willoughby	[2013] UKSC 17	17 January	20 March
Public Relations Consultants Association Ltd v The Newspaper Licensing Agency Ltd	[2013] UKSC 18	11–12 February	17 April
Jones (by Caldwell) v First Tier Tribunal and Criminal Injuries Compensation Authority	[2013] UKSC 19	28 February	17 April
Barts and the London NHS Trust v Verma	[2013] UKSC 20	27 February	24 April
Uprichard v Scottish Ministers	[2013] UKSC 21	5–6 March	24 April
Salvesen v Riddell	[2013] UKSC 22	12–13 March	24 April
R (Faulkner) v Secretary of State for Justice	[2013] UKSC 23	19–21 November 2012	1 May
WHA Ltd v Her Majesty's Revenue and Customs	[2013] UKSC 24	21–24 January	1 May
R (ClientEarth) v Secretary of State for the Environment, Food and Rural Affairs	[2013] UKSC 25	7 March	1 May
Futter v The Commissioners for Her Majesty's Revenue and Customs	[2013] UKSC 26	12–14 March	9 May
SL v Westminster City Council	[2013] UKSC 27	28–29 January	9 May
BNY Corporate Trustee Services Ltd v Neuberger Berman Europe Ltd	[2013] UKSC 28	25–26 February	9 May
The President of the Methodist Conference v Preston	[2013] UKSC 29	13–14 February	15 May
Commissioners for Her Majesty's Revenue and Customs v Marks and Spencer plc	[2013] UKSC 30	15 April	22 May
Vestergaard Frandsen v Bestnet Europe Ltd	[2013] UKSC 31	24 April	22 May
Public Prosecution Service of Northern Ireland v Elliott	[2013] UKSC 32	22 April	22 May
Re B (A Child)	[2013] UKSC 33	25 February	12 June
Prest v Petrodel Resources Ltd	[2013] UKSC 34	5–6 March	12 June
Ust-Kamenogorsk Hydropower Plant JSC v AES Ust-Kamenogorstk Hydropower Plant LLP	[2013] UKSC 35	1–2 May	12 June
O'Neill No 2 v Her Majesty's Advocate	[2013] UKSC 36	29–30 April	13 June
Apollo Engineering Ltd v James Scott Ltd	[2013] UKSC 37	13 May	13 June
Bank Mellat v Her Majesty's Treasury (No. 1)	[2013] UKSC 38	19–21 March	19 June
Bank Mellat v Her Majesty's Treasury (No. 2)	[2013] UKSC 39	19–21 March	19 June
Cusack v London Borough of Harrow	[2013] UKSC 40	23 April	19 June
Smith v The Ministry of Defence	[2013] UKSC 41	18–21 February	19 June
Her Majesty's Revenue and Customs v Aimia Coalition Loyalty UK Ltd (No. 2)	[2013] UKSC 42	24–25 October 2012	20 June
R v Brown	[2013] UKSC 43	7 March	26 June
Abela v Baadarani	[2013] UKSC 44	10–11 April	26 June
North v Dumfries and Galloway Council	[2013] UKSC 45	20–21 May	26 June
Virgin Atlantic Airways Ltd v Zodiac Seats UK Ltd	[2013] UKSC 46	29–30 April	3 July
R (Sturnham) v The Parole Board of England and Wales (No. 2)	[2013] UKSC 47	9 May	3 July
Kapri v The Lord Advocate representing The Government of the Republic of Albania	[2013] UKSC 48	13 June	10 July
R (AA) v Secretary of State for the Home Department	[2013] UKSC 49	7–8 May	10 July
Benedetti v Sawiris	[2013] UKSC 50	26–28 February	17 July
R (New London College Ltd) v Secretary of State for the Home Department	[2013] UKSC 51	5–6 June	17 July
Re Nortel Companies	[2013] UKSC 52	14–16 May	24 July
R (Modaresi) v Secretary of State for Health	[2013] UKSC 53	19 June	24 July
Daejan Investments Ltd v Benson (No. 2)	[2013] UKSC 54	4 December 2012	24 July
South Lanarkshire Council v The Scottish Information Commissioner	[2013] UKSC 55	8 July	29 July
R v Hughes	[2013] UKSC 56	5 June	31 July
Teal Assurance Company Ltd v W R Berkley Insurance Ltd	[2013] UKSC 57	17–18 June	31 July
McGraddie v McGraddie	[2013] UKSC 58	10 July	31 July
Torfaen County Borough Council v Douglas Willis Ltd	[2013] UKSC 59	9 July	31 July
Re A (Children)	[2013] UKSC 60	22–23 July	9 September
Osborn v The Parole Board	[2013] UKSC 61	16–18 April	9 October
Secretary of State for the Home Department v Al-Jedda	[2013] UKSC 62	27 June	9 October
McGeoch v The Lord President of the Council	[2013] UKSC 63	10–11 June	16 October
R v Gul	[2013] UKSC 64	25–26 June	23 October
Szepietowski v The National Crime Agency	[2013] UKSC 65	15 July	23 October
Woodland v Essex County Council	[2013] UKSC 66	3–4 July	23 October
Aintree University Hospitals NHS Foundation Trust v James	[2013] UKSC 67	24 July	30 October
R (Reilly) v Secretary of State for Work and Pensions	[2013] UKSC 68	29 July	30 October
Cotter v Commissioners For Her Majesty's Revenue & Customs	[2013] UKSC 69	3 October	6 November
The Alexandros T	[2013] UKSC 70	8–9 July	6 November
Sakalis v Ministry of Justice, Lithuania	[2013] UKSC 71	16–17 July	20 November
Patel v Secretary of State for the Home Department	[2013] UKSC 72	3–4 July	20 November
Bull v Hall	[2013] UKSC 73	9–10 October	27 November
Zoumbas v Secretary of State for the Home Department	[2013] UKSC 74	28 October	27 November
Re KL (A Child)	[2013] UKSC 75	18 November	4 December
Re an application by Martin Corey for Judicial Review	[2013] UKSC 76	7 October	4 December
R (Hodkin) v Registrar-General of Births, Deaths and Marriages	[2013] UKSC 77	18 July	11 December
R (Edwards) v Environment Agency (No. 2)	[2013] UKSC 78	22 July	11 December
G v Scottish Ministers	[2013] UKSC 79	7–8 October	18 December
West London Mental Health NHS Trust v Chhabra	[2013] UKSC 80	29 October	18 December
AA (Somalia) v Entry Clearance Officer (Addis Ababa)	[2013] UKSC 81	21 November	18 December

== Judges ==
- Lord Walker of Gestingthorpe served until 17 March 2013.
- Lord Hope of Craighead served until 26 June 2013. Lady Hale of Richmond replaced him as Deputy President of the Supreme Court.
- Lord Hughes of Ombersley became a justice on 9 April 2013. He replaced Lord Dyson, who stepped down to become Master of the Rolls.
- Lord Toulson became a justice on 9 April 2013. He replaced Lord Walker of Gestingthorpe.
- Lord Hodge became a justice on 1 October 2013. He replaced Lord Hope of Craighead.
