= Henry Mance =

Henry Mance may refer to:

- Henry Christopher Mance (1840–1926), British electrical engineer
- Henry Osborne Mance (1875–1966), British Army officer, transportation expert and author
- Henry Mance Author and Journalist
