= Bull v Hall =

UK discrimination and freedom of religious expression legal case

- Court: Supreme Court of the United Kingdom
- Full case name: Bull and another v Hall and another
- Argued: 9–10 October 2013
- Decided: 27 November 2013
- Neutral citation: [2013] UKSC 73

Holding
- Religious beliefs cannot be used to justify discrimination based on sexual orientation

Case opinions
- Majority: Lady Hale (Lord Neuberger, Lord Kerr, Lord Hughes and Lord Toulson concurred)

Area of law
- discrimination, religious freedom

Bull and another v Hall and another [2013] UKSC 73 was a Supreme Court of the United Kingdom discrimination case between Peter and Hazelmary Bull and Martin Hall and Steven Preddy. Hall and Preddy, a homosexual couple, brought the case after the Bulls refused to give them a double room in their guesthouse, citing their religious beliefs. Following appeals, the Supreme Court held the rulings of the lower courts in deciding for Hall and Preddy and against the Bulls. The court said that Preddy and Hall faced discrimination which could not be justified by the Bulls' right to religious belief. It was held that people in the United Kingdom could not justify discrimination against others on the basis of their sexual orientation due to their religious beliefs.

== Background ==
In September 2008, Steven Preddy and Martin Hall, a homosexual couple in a civil partnership, booked a double room at a guesthouse in Marazion, Cornwall over the telephone. When they arrived, the Bulls, who are Christians, refused the couple a double room as they found extramarital sex incompatible with their religious beliefs. Hall and Preddy were offered a two-bed room or two singles, but left and found alternative accommodation. They then filed a complaint of discrimination on the basis of sexual orientation to the County Court which found in their favour and ordered the Bulls to pay £1800 to each of them in damages. The Court of Appeal agreed with the lower court but the Bulls appealed to the Supreme Court.

== Case ==
The Bulls argued that the Court of Appeal had been wrong in their judgement as they had not discriminated on the couple's sexual orientation but rather their marital status, which is allowed in English law. They accepted that this resulted in indirect discrimination for same-sex couples (who could not at the time get married) but maintained that this was justified because of their sincerely held religious beliefs.

== Judgment ==
The appeal was dismissed unanimously, with all judges ruling that the indirect discrimination could not be justified by religion and a majority of three judges holding that it still constituted direct discrimination. Lady Hale wrote and delivered the majority decision, with which Lord Kerr and Lord Toulson agreed. Lord Neuberger and Lord Hughes dissented on the ruling of direct discrimination but concurred with the other justices in a unanimous agreement that the case constituted unlawful indirect discrimination.

== Reaction ==
LGBT rights organisation Stonewall said they were "pleased" that the Court had upheld the rights they had "fought so hard to secure". A statement from the Christian Institute criticised the outcome, saying that "the powers of political correctness have reached all the way to the top of the judicial tree".

== See also ==
- LGBT rights in the United Kingdom
- Same-sex marriage in the United Kingdom
- 2013 Judgments of the Supreme Court of the United Kingdom
