= McDermid v Nash Dredging & Reclamation Co Ltd =

House of Lords case

- Court: House of Lords
- Citation: [1987] AC 906

McDermid v Nash Dredging & Reclamation Co Ltd [1987] AC 906 is an English tort law case, concerning a non-delegable duty of care.

== Facts ==
The plaintiff lost his leg working on The Ina, a tug owned by Stevin, Dutch parent company of Nash Dredging. The plaintiff was employed by Nash Dredging who told him to work on The Ina. He tried to untie The Ina from mooring. Tug master, Captain Sas, moved vessel without waiting for plaintiff to give agreed signal, knocking twice on side of wheelhouse to indicate ropes safely on board. Plaintiff’s leg was caught up in the ropes. Nash Dredging denied that they were vicariously liable for the conduct of another company's employee.

== Judgment ==
The House of Lords held Nash Dredging liable on the grounds that there was no safe system of work in operation. Lord Hailsham said the "plaintiff’s claim... [is] based on the allegation ... of a ‘non-delegable’ duty resting on his employers to take reasonable care to provide a ‘safe system of work’... the defendants had delegated their duty to the plaintiff to Captain Sas, the duty had not been performed, and the defendants must pay for the breach of their ‘non-delegable’ obligation."

Lord Brandon said: "Despite such delegation the employer is liable for the non-performance of the duty... For this failure by Captain Sas to operate the system which he had devised, the defendants, as the plaintiff’s employers, are personally, not vicariously, liable to him."

== See also ==
- English tort law
