= Fearn v Tate Gallery =

2023 English case

- Court: Supreme Court of the United Kingdom
- Full case name: Fearn and others v Board of Trustees of the Tate Gallery
- Decided: 1 February 2023
- Citation: [2023] UKSC 4
- Transcript: Full text of judgment

Case history
- Appealed from: Court of Appeal; [2020] EWCA Civ 104

Court membership
- Judges sitting: Lord Reed; Lord Lloyd-Jones; Lord Kitchin; Lord Sales; Lord Leggatt

Fearn v Tate Gallery [2023] UKSC 4 is a judgment of the Supreme Court of the United Kingdom on the tort of private nuisance.

== Facts ==
Fearn v Tate Gallery concerned a nuisance claim arising from the defendant's operation of a public viewing gallery, which allowed large numbers of visitors to look directly into the claimants' neighbouring flats.

== Judgment ==
Lord Leggatt delivered the majority judgment.

The Supreme Court held that visual intrusion can in principle amount to a nuisance, and on the facts, a narrow 3:2 majority found that the Tate Modern was liable for the operation of a viewing gallery from which the public could see straight into the claimants' luxury flats.
