= Vice-President of the Criminal Division =

The Vice-President of the Criminal Division is a Lord Justice of Appeal who assists the Lord Chief Justice, the President of the Criminal Division of the Court of Appeal of England and Wales. The post was created by Lord Bingham of Cornhill during his tenure as Lord Chief Justice. He appointed Sir Christopher Rose to take up some of the burden of his duties with respect to the Criminal Division, while appointing Sir Paul Kennedy Vice-President of the Queen's Bench Division to do the same regarding that division of the High Court. This allowed Lord Bingham to spend time hearing cases in both divisions as well as the Queen's Bench Divisional Court and the Crown Court. The current holder is Sir Timothy Holroyde.

== Vice-presidents ==
- 1997: Sir Christopher Rose
- 24 April 2006: Sir David Latham
- February 2009: Sir Anthony Hughes
- 2013: Heather Hallett, Baroness Hallett
- October 2019 Sir Adrian Fulford
- October 2022 Sir Timothy Holroyde
- 1 August 2025 Sir Andrew Edis
