= Heather Hallett, Baroness Hallett =

English judge (born 1949)

The Right Honourable The Baroness Hallett DBE PC KC
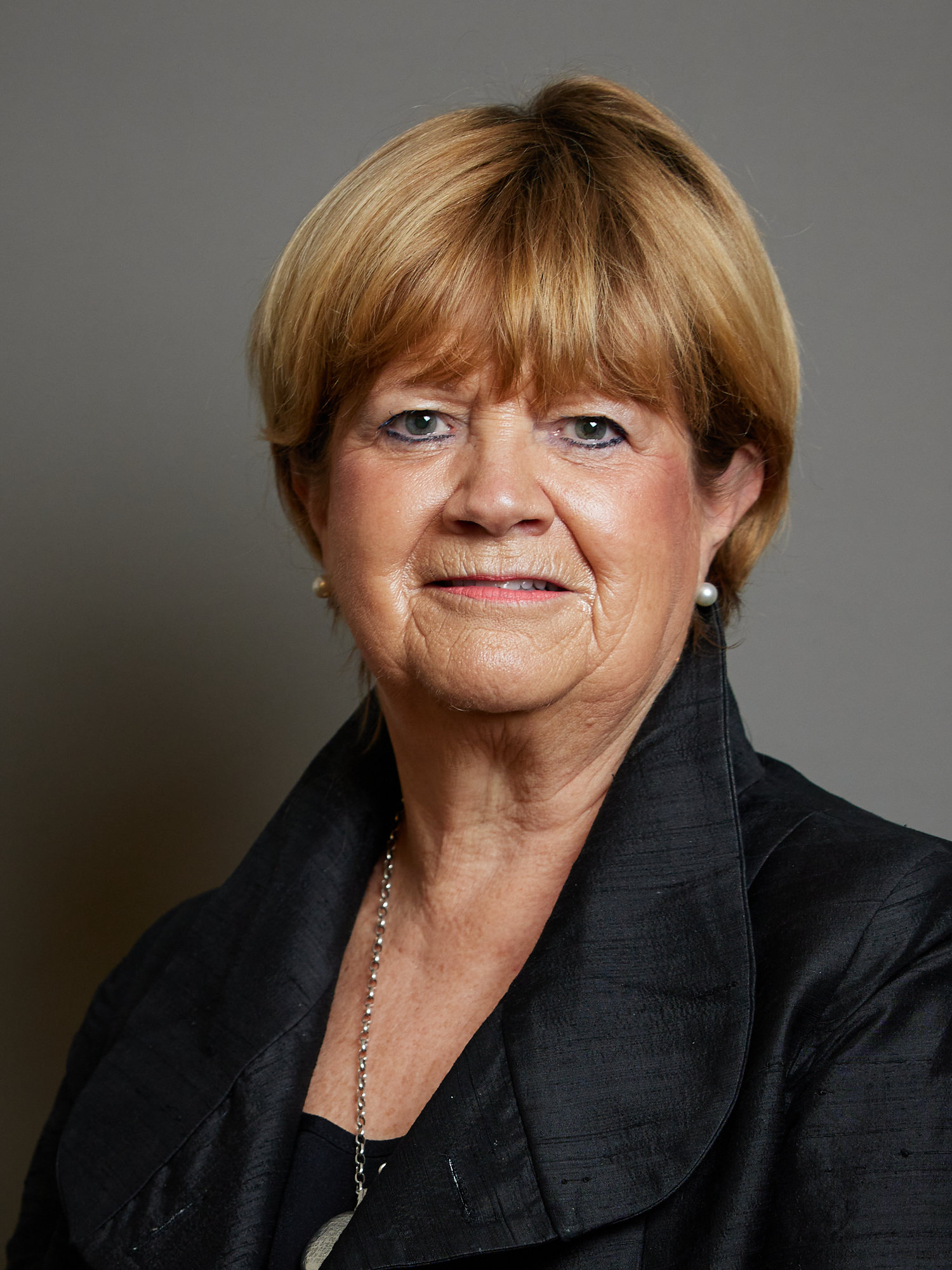
- Official portrait, 2021

Vice-President of the Criminal Division of the Court of Appeal
- In office 8 November 2013 – 21 October 2019
- Preceded by: Sir Anthony Hughes
- Succeeded by: Sir Adrian Fulford

Vice-President of the Queen's Bench Division
- In office 3 October 2011 – 3 March 2014
- Preceded by: Sir John Thomas
- Succeeded by: Sir Nigel Davis

Member of the House of Lords
- Lord Temporal
- Life peerage 11 October 2019

Personal details
- Born: Heather Carol Hallett; 16 December 1949 (age 76) Eastleigh, England
- Party: Crossbench (since 2019)
- Spouse: Nigel Wilkinson (m. 1974)
- Children: 2
- Education: St Hugh's College, Oxford
- Occupation: Judge

Heather Carol Hallett, Baroness Hallett, DBE, PC, KC (born 16 December 1949), is a retired British judge of the Court of Appeal and a crossbench life peer. The first woman to chair the Bar Council and the fifth woman to sit in the Court of Appeal, Hallett led the independent inquest into the 7/7 bombings. In April 2019, she was appointed Chair of the Security Vettings Appeal Panel. In December 2021, she was announced as the chair of the public inquiry into the UK Government's handling of the COVID-19 pandemic. On 29 June 2022, the Government accepted Baroness Hallett's proposed terms of reference for the inquiry, with minor changes suggested by the devolved administrations.

== Early life and education ==
Hallett was born in Eastleigh in 1949 and was the daughter of Hugh Victor Dudley Hallett QPM (1919–1991), a beat policeman who worked his way up to the rank of assistant chief constable and secretary general of the International Police Association. Hallett recalled during BBC Radio 4's Desert Island Discs that one of her early childhood homes was their local police station, which doubled as a custody suite. She was educated at Brockenhurst Grammar School, in the New Forest, and at St Hugh's College, Oxford.

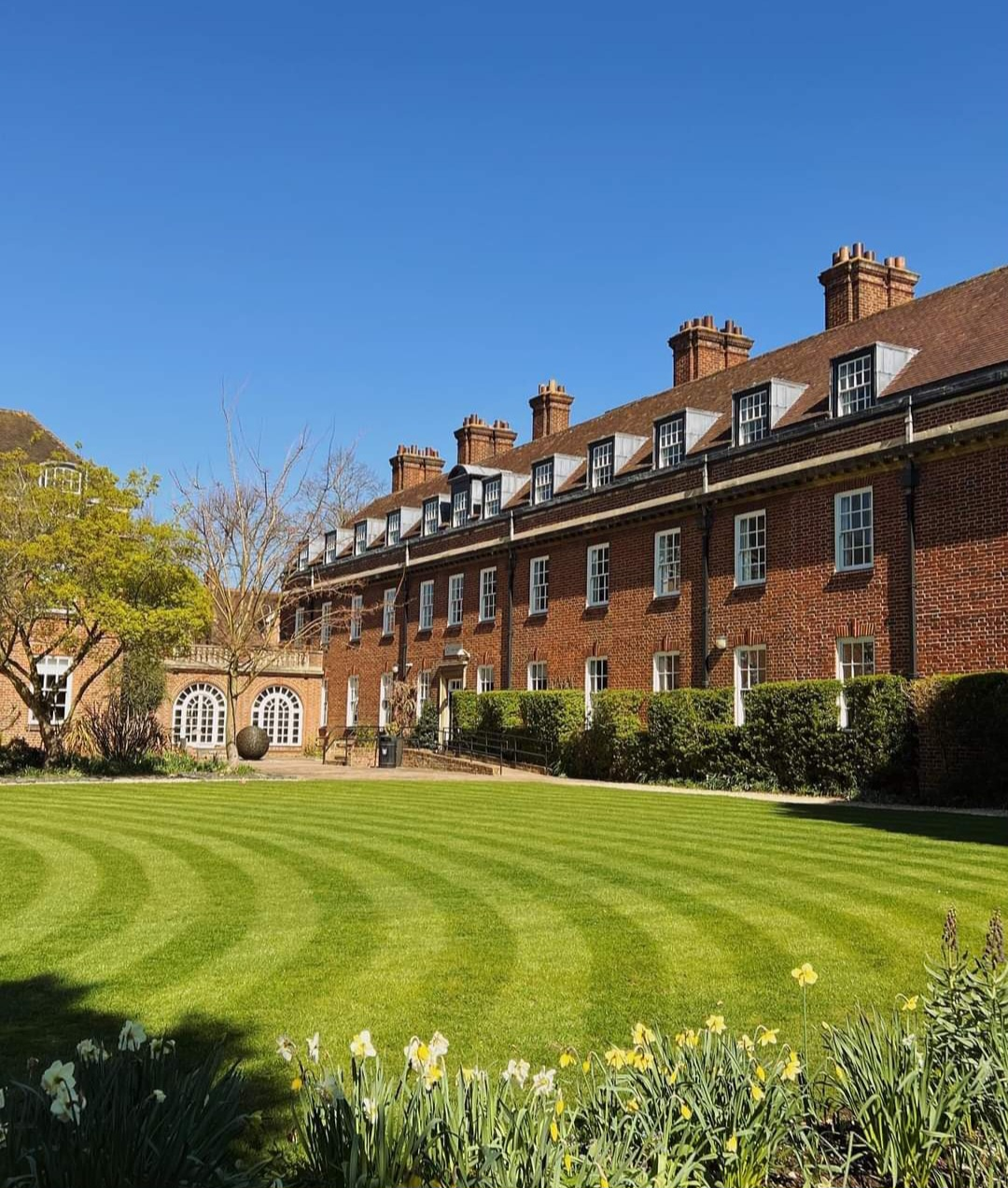
St Hugh's College, Oxford

== Legal career ==
Hallett was called to the Bar by the Inner Temple in 1972, specialising in criminal law. She successfully defended a stepfather wrongly accused of murder in an early "cot death" related trial. She was appointed Queen's Counsel in 1989 and a Bencher of Inner Temple in 1993. She was the first woman to chair the Bar Council, in 1998, having been vice-chair in 1997, and became Treasurer of the Inner Temple in 2011.

Hallett was appointed a Recorder of the Crown Court in 1989, then a deputy High Court judge in 1995, before becoming a full-time judge of the High Court in 1999, assigned to the Queen's Bench Division. As a High Court judge, she received the customary appointment as a Dame Commander of the Order of the British Empire (DBE) on 21 July 1999. She was promoted to the Court of Appeal in 2005. She was appointed a member of the Judicial Appointments Commission in January 2006, as a representative of the judiciary.

Hallett was chosen in 2009 to act as coroner in the inquest of the 52 fatal victims of the 7/7 bombings. She was widely praised for her empathy towards the inquest witnesses. She began a four-year term as Vice-President of the Queen's Bench Division on 3 October 2011, succeeding Baron Thomas of Cwmgiedd. In May 2012 in an appeal hearing she quashed the murder conviction of 24-year-old Sam Hallam as unsafe after he had spent seven years in prison; he was one of the youngest victims of a UK miscarriage of justice.

In February 2013, she was described as the 8th most powerful woman in Britain by Woman's Hour on BBC Radio 4. In November 2013, she was appointed Vice-President of the Criminal Division of the Court of Appeal, succeeding Lord Hughes of Ombersley.

In March 2014, she was appointed by the Secretary of State for Northern Ireland to carry out an independent review of the administrative scheme by which 'letters of assurance' were sent to those known as the 'on the runs'.

In December 2021, she was announced as the chair of the public inquiry into the UK government's handling of the COVID-19 pandemic.

In July 2022, the terms of reference for the public inquiry into the UK government's handling of the COVID-19 pandemic were agreed by Boris Johnson, and he launched the public inquiry.

== Honours and affiliations ==
She was appointed Queen's Counsel (QC) on 4 April 1989.

She was sworn in as a member of Her Majesty's Most Honourable Privy Council in 2005. This entitled her to the honorific prefix "The Right Honourable" and after ennoblement the post-nominal letters "PC" for life.

She was awarded the honorary degree of Doctor of Laws (LL.D.) by the University of Derby in 2000. She was also awarded an honorary doctorate by the Open University in 2004 and the University of Portsmouth in 2013.

On 14 June 2017 she was made an Honorary Fellow of The Academy of Experts in recognition of her contribution to The Academy's Judicial Committee and work for Expert Witnesses.

She is the patron of Women in Criminal Law.

Hallett is an honorary fellow of her alma mater, St Hugh's College, Oxford.

== House of Lords ==
Hallett was nominated for a life peerage in the 2019 Prime Minister's Resignation Honours, and was created Baroness Hallett, of Rye in the County of East Sussex, on 11 October 2019. She sits as a crossbencher in the House of Lords and last voted in 2021.

== Personal life ==
Hallett is married to Nigel Vivian Marshall Wilkinson, a recorder and deputy high court judge. They have two sons.
