= BNY Corporate Trustees Services Ltd v Eurosail-UK 2007-3BL plc =

Decision by supreme court of UK

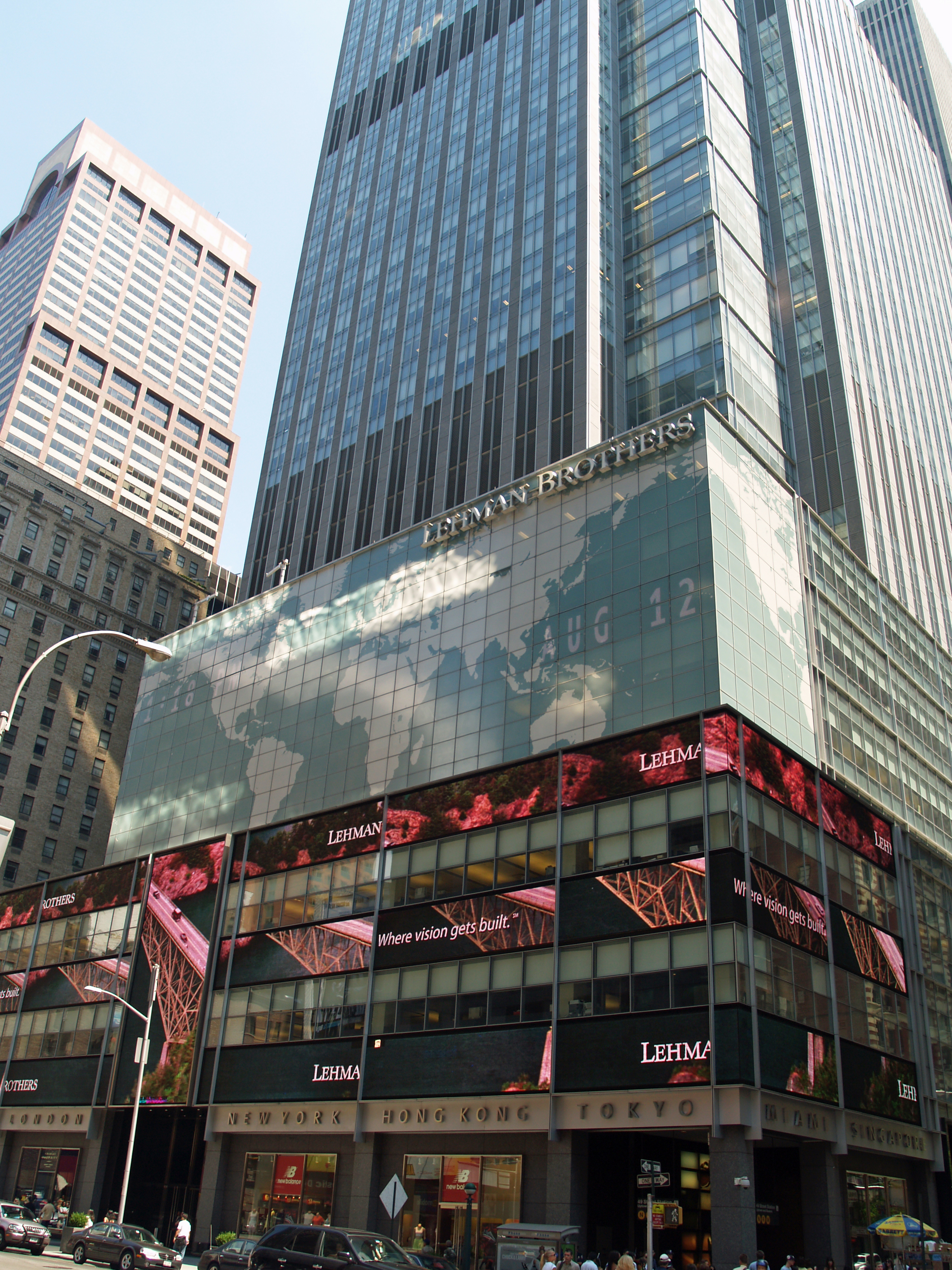
- Lehman Brothers former Time Square headquarters
- Court: Supreme Court
- Decided: 9 May 2013
- Citations: [2013] 1 WLR 1408 [2013] Bus LR 715 [2013] 2 All ER (Comm) 531 [2013] UKSC 28 [2013] 1 BCLC 613 [2013] 3 All ER 271 [2013] BCC 397

Case history
- Appealed from: [2011] EWCA Civ 227 (Court of Appeal) [2010] EWHC 2005 (Ch) (High Court)

Court membership
- Judges sitting: Lord Hope; Lord Walker; Lord Mance; Lord Sumption; Lord Carnwath

Case opinions
- Lord Walker, Lord Hope

Keywords
- Insolvency, balance-sheet test

BNY Corporate Trustees Services Ltd v Eurosail-UK 2007-3BL plc [2013] UKSC 28 (often referred to as simply the Eurosail case) was a decision of the Supreme Court of the United Kingdom in relation to the proper interpretation of section 123(2) of the Insolvency Act 1986 (the so-called "balance-sheet test") as it had been applied in commercial bond documentation. The analysis and reasoning in the case are now commonly referred to as the Eurosail test.

The ruling related to the insolvency of a special purpose company which had issued asset-backed securities as part of a securitisation. However, the collapse of Lehman Brothers meant that certain tranches of the securities were exposed because Lehman Brothers would not be able to meet its obligations under derivative contracts which had been entered into. Although strictly speaking the Court was expressing an opinion on the proper interpretation of an event of default in the bond documentation, the ruling is treated as an authoritative interpretation on section 123(2).

The Supreme Court also rejected the "point of no return" test suggested by the Court of Appeal, and also ruled on the limited efficacy of the post-enforcement call option ("PECO").

== Facts ==
The company, Eurosail-UK 2007-3BL plc, was a single purpose entity which was formed to acquire various mortgage loans as part of a securitisation in 2007.

The transaction was complex, and the documentation was described as "forbiddingly voluminous". The benefit of various mortgage loans were assigned to the company, which then issued various tranches of bonds to investors (then, as normally happens in a securitisation, the proceeds of those bonds was then paid over to the original lenders under the mortgage loans as the purchase price for the loans). The payments under the various tranches of notes were intended to be protected by certain swap transactions which had been entered into the company with Lehman Brothers. But after the notes were issued, Lehman Brothers went into bankruptcy meaning that the company could not expect to receive payment under those swaps. The financial effect of this on the company was that although it could continue to meet its obligations for the time being, it would almost inevitably become unable to do so at a future point (because the company was a single purpose company there was no prospect of it trading out of its financial difficulties). The essential question for the court was whether this inevitable future shortfall means that the company could be treated as insolvent today, or whether it was necessary to wait until either it ran out of funds, or at least came close to doing so.

If it was decided that because the financial track the company was inevitably on meant it should be treated as insolvent now, then this would trigger an event of default under the bond documentation, which would result in an acceleration of the payment of all of the tranches on the notes. On the other hand, if the company was allowed to continue for several more years, the various tranches of the notes which matured sooner would be paid in full, and those tranches of the notes which were due to be repaid later would bear the entire loss caused by the inability of Lehman Brothers to make payments under the swaps.

Essentially the dispute was between the different tranches of noteholders as to how the loss for the collapse of Lehman should be shared between them. The note trustee was not represented at trial, and took a neutral position.

A subsidiary issue which arose in the trial related to the post enforcement call option (PECO). This was a mechanism designated to ensure that the company remained "bankruptcy remote". Essentially if there was a default under any tranche of the notes, each investor had a put option which would allow it to force a related company (Eurosail Options Ltd, referred to as "OptionCo") to buy the notes at face value. Theoretically this would mean that the investors would never take a loss, and OptionCo would then release the company from its obligations to avoid a bankruptcy. The subsidiary question was whether this protection should affect the conclusion whether the company was insolvent or not.

== Decision ==
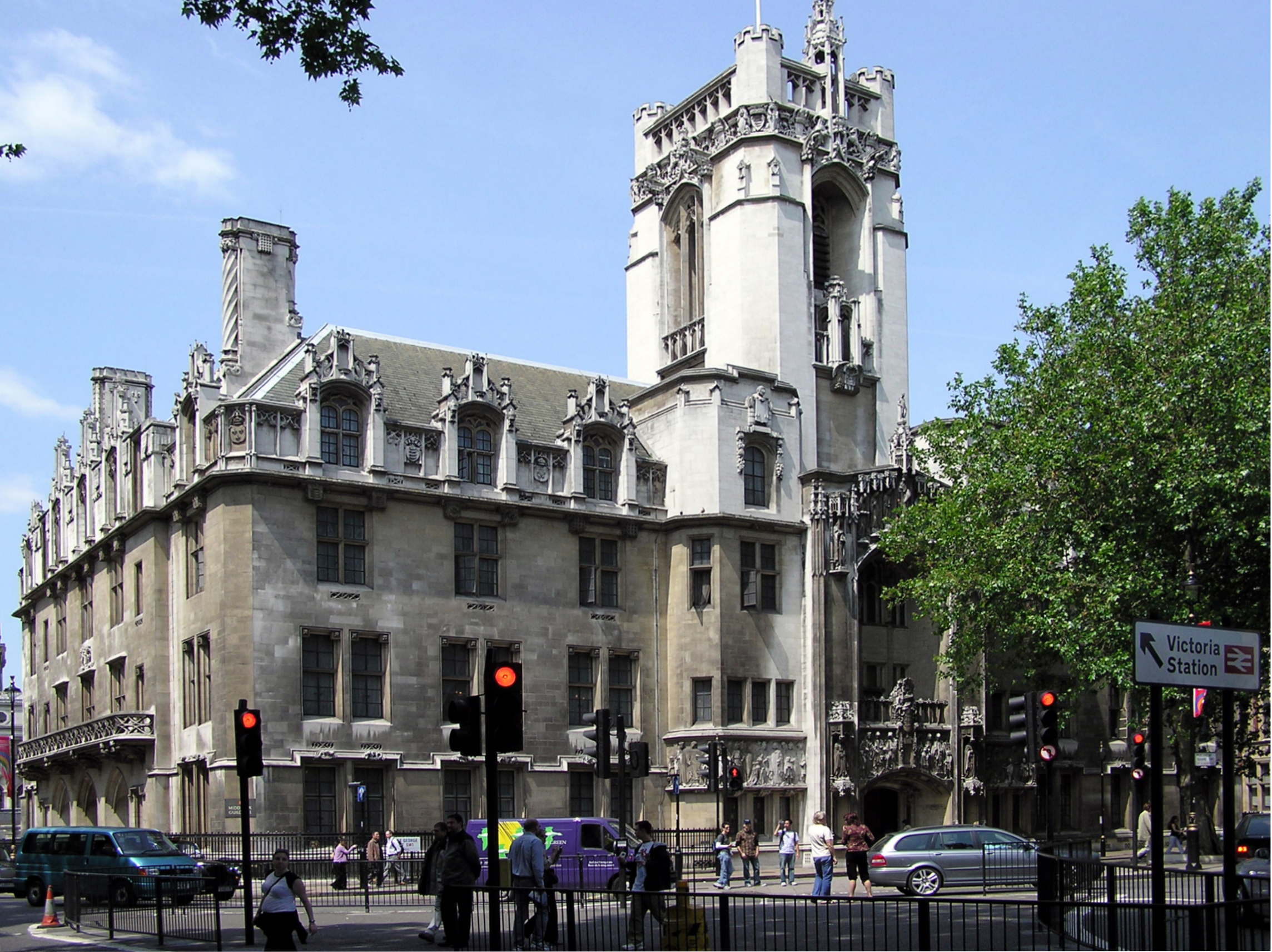
The Supreme Court.

At first instance and in the Court of Appeal it was held that the company was not insolvent, and the Court of Appeal had applied the "point of no return" test in relation to determination of balance sheet solvency. The Supreme Court upheld those decisions, but for different reasons.

=== Lord Walker ===
Lord Walker, with whom all the other judges agreed, gave the main judgment on the insolvency test under English law.

The crux of the decision was how to apply the test in section 123(2) in order to determine whether a company was balance-sheet insolvent. That section provides:

A company is also deemed unable to pay its debts if it is proved to the satisfaction of the court that the value of the company’s assets is less than the amount of its liabilities, taking into account its contingent and prospective liabilities.

The key here was the prospective liabilities. Various tranches of the notes were due for payment at various future dates, the latest of which were 2045 (or thirty years after the date that the case was being heard in the Supreme Court).

Lord Walker restated the basic proposition, that "whether or not the test of balance-sheet solvency is satisfied must depend on the available evidence as to the circumstances of the particular case". He noted that given the specific (ie. non-trading) nature of the company, it was permissible to use its present assets as a guide to the company's ability to meet its long-term liabilities. The insufficiency of assets which caused concern was the inability of Lehman Brothers as swap counterparty to make payments under the swaps. However, Lord Walker noted that there may be no payment due at all under the swap contracts depending upon the movements in currency exchange rates over the periods.

However, he also found that there existed "three imponderable factors", namely:

- the effect of potential currency movements;
- the effect of potential interest rate movements; and
- the state the UK economy and housing market.

He noted that these factors needed to be considered in light of a period of more than 30 years until the final redemption of the notes in 2045. This meant that trying to evaluate balance-sheet insolvency in the context of those contingencies was "a matter of speculation rather than calculation and prediction on any scientific basis". He further noted (but did not enumerate it as a fourth imponderable factor) that the company has a claim in the estate of Lehman Brothers which has a current market value. Accordingly the courts should proceed with the greatest caution before deciding that a company is balance sheet insolvent. On the evidence before the court, he concluded that the company's ability to pay all of its debts (whether present or future) could not be finally determined until much closer to the date for redemption. Accordingly, the company was not balance-sheet insolvent under the test in section 123(2).

He also held that the "point of no return", adopted by the Court of Appeal, should be rejected. He stated that the phrase "should not pass into common usage as a paraphrase of the effect of section 123(2)".

=== Lord Hope ===
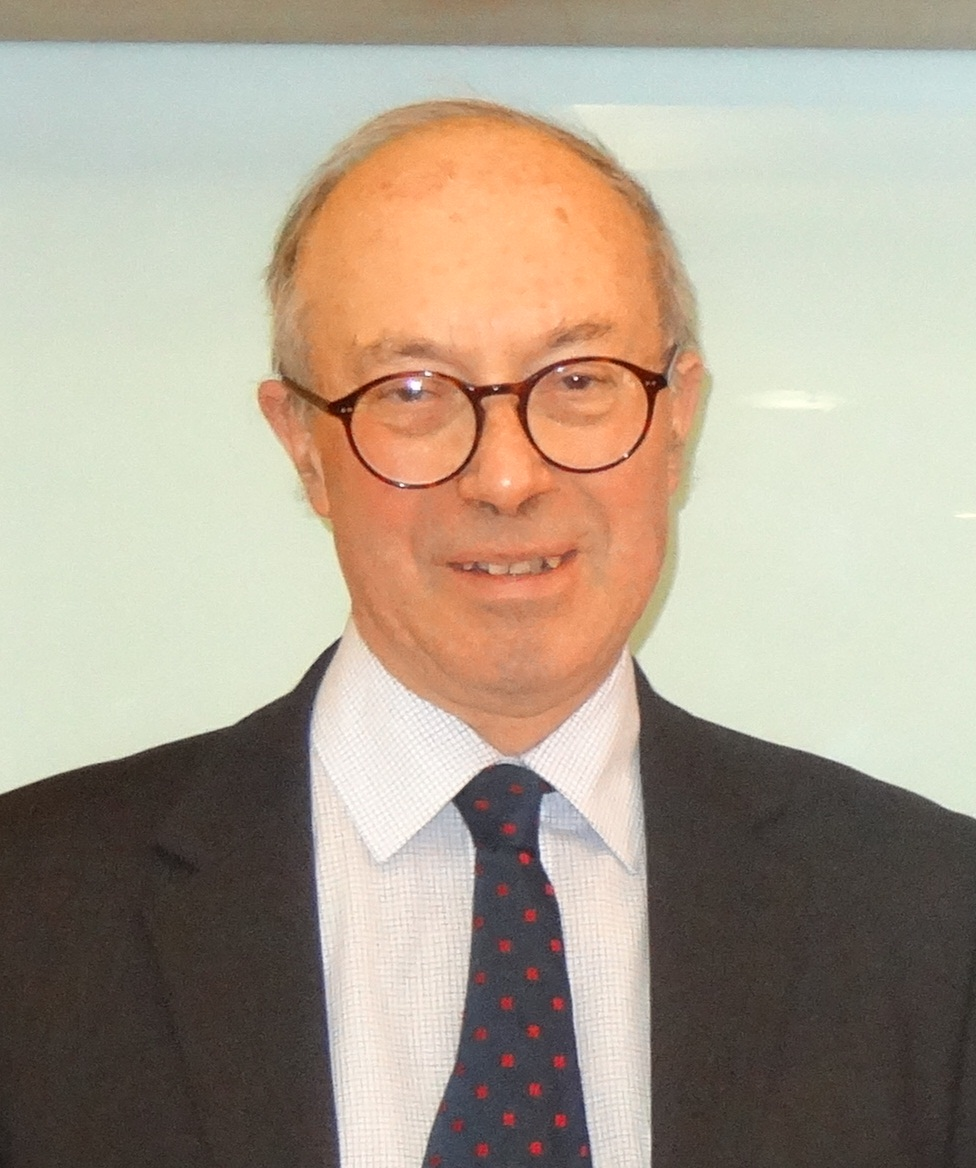
Lord Hope of Craighead.

Lord Hope gave a short concurring judgment in which he agreed with Lord Walker and then went on to consider the PECO. Technically speaking the additional protection afforded by the PECO became irrelevant because of the decision that the company was not insolvent. But Lord Hope noted that "A PECO is widely used in securitisation transactions of the kind that was entered into in this case, and we have been told that the question is of some importance to the securitisation market more generally. So it is appropriate that we should give our reasons", and therefore he expressed his opinion on the issue.

Lord Hope expressed the view that the Supreme Court agreed "with the Chancellor and the Court of Appeal that it has no effect on the way the liability of the Issuer to the Noteholders for the purposes of the default provision". In the courts below the view had been expressed that "[u]nless and until the option holder releases the Issuer from all further liability, which it is under no obligation to do, the liability of the Issuer is unaffected." Accordingly, even though there might be a commercial expectation that the PECO would operate to secure the release of company from its obligations under the notes, for the purpose of applying the insolvent test one should not make that assumption. In this case the liability under the notes would remain the same - it is simply that exercising the PECO would mean that the liability of the company was transferred to the OptionCo.

Some market commentators predicted that this would lead to originators reverting to traditional limited recourse language, particularly as the tax advantages related to PECOs no longer subsisted.

== Other points ==
The Supreme Court cited with approval the decision of Briggs J in Re Cheyne Finance plc [2008] EWHC 2402 (Ch), [2008] BCC 182, in relation to the "element of futurity" inherent in the insolvency test.

All of the barristers who appeared in the case for every party (Gabriel Moss QC, Robin Dicker QC, Richard Fisher, Jeremy Goldring and David Allison) all belonged the same set of chambers.

== Reception ==
Commentary on the decision has been largely positive.

Most commentators broadly concurred that the decision "has clarified that the test in section 123(2) requires the exercise of judgement. Creditors wishing to rely on the balance-sheet test in winding up proceedings will find it harder to successfully establish the subjective threshold of the test."

It has been referred to as a "profound and far-reaching" decision, noting in particular that "the contention that a PECO structure gives effective limited recourse is now discredited." UK based issuers who operate these structures will not be able to rely on the PECO to effectively discount the value of their liabilities to noteholders back to the level of their assets, at least until the conclusion of the transaction. Conversely, it was noted that "[p]ractitioners had been looking to this case to give some guidance on the issue of balance sheet insolvency. Lord Neuberger in the Court of Appeal went some way towards doing this with the adoption of the point of no return test... The Supreme Court decision, however, takes us back to where we were at the outset ... with a petitioner needing to satisfy a court that a company is balance sheet insolvent and that exercise being heavily fact specific."

However, other commentators note that "there are [still] unanswered questions", noting that the case involved "a ‘closed business’ [which] differs greatly from the majority of businesses and the balance-sheet test itself is very dependent on the specific circumstances of the case."

== See also ==
- United Kingdom insolvency law
