= Jonathan Mance, Baron Mance =

British judge (born 1943)

The Right Honourable The Lord Mance PC
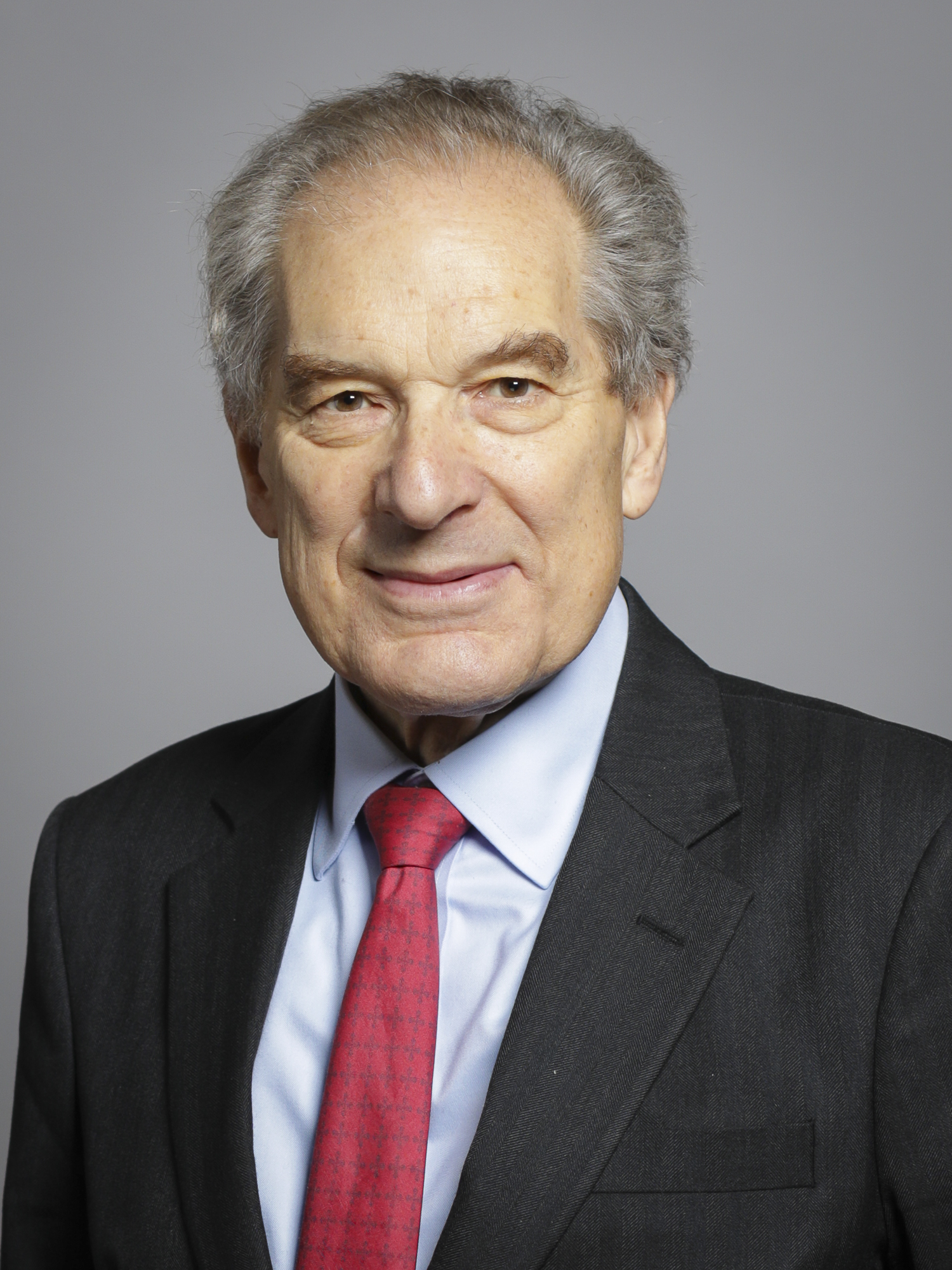
- Mance in 2019

Deputy President of the Supreme Court of the United Kingdom
- In office 26 September 2017 – 6 June 2018
- Nominated by: David Lidington
- Appointed by: Elizabeth II
- President: The Baroness Hale of Richmond
- Preceded by: The Baroness Hale of Richmond
- Succeeded by: Lord Reed

Justice of the Supreme Court of the United Kingdom (Note: Lord of Appeal in Ordinary until 30 September 2009)
- In office 3 October 2005 – 25 September 2017
- Nominated by: Jack Straw
- Appointed by: Elizabeth II
- Preceded by: The Lord Steyn
- Succeeded by: Lady Arden of Heswall

Lord Justice of Appeal
- In office 27 April 1999 – 3 October 2005

High Court Judge
- In office 1993 – 27 April 1999

Member of the House of Lords
- Lord Temporal
- Lord of Appeal in Ordinary; 3 October 2005

Personal details
- Born: Jonathan Hugh Mance; 6 June 1943 (age 83)
- Spouse: Mary Arden (m. 1973)
- Children: 3
- Education: Charterhouse School
- Alma mater: University College, Oxford
- Occupation: Judge
- Profession: Barrister

Jonathan Hugh Mance, Baron Mance, PC (born 6 June 1943) is a retired British judge who was formerly Deputy President of the Supreme Court of the United Kingdom.

== Early life ==
Mance was born on 6 June 1943, one of four children of Sir Henry Stenhouse Mance, one-time chairman of Lloyd's of London, by his wife Joan Erica Robertson Baker. His grandfather, Sir Henry Osborne Mance, was a distinguished soldier and President of the Institute of Transport; his great-grandfather, Sir Henry Christopher Mance, invented the heliograph.

Like his father, he attended Charterhouse School, a boarding school in Godalming, Surrey. He then studied law at University College, Oxford and graduated with a first class degree. He was called to the Bar by the Middle Temple in 1965, becoming a QC in 1982 and a Bencher in 1989.

== Judicial career ==
In 1990, he became a recorder, and on 25 October 1993 was appointed a High Court judge, serving in the Queen's Bench Division, and received the customary knighthood. On 27 April 1999, he was appointed a Lord Justice of Appeal, and appointed to the Privy Council.

On 3 October 2005, he was appointed a Lord of Appeal in Ordinary with a Life Peerage as Baron Mance, of Frognal in the London Borough of Camden. He was introduced in the House of Lords on 12 October 2005. On 1 October 2009, he and nine other Lords of Appeal became Justices of the Supreme Court upon that body's inauguration. In a speech to the Hoge Raad in The Netherlands in 2013, Lord Mance described the creation of the Supreme Court as the consequence of a "back of an envelope plan", which "took some years to straighten out".

He has also served as chairman of the Banking Appeals Tribunal (1992–93), chairman of the Consultative Council of European Judges (2000), president of the British Insurance Law Association (2000–02) and trustee of the European Law Academy (2003).

Mance was appointed Deputy President of the Supreme Court of the United Kingdom in September 2017, succeeding Baroness Hale of Richmond, who became President of the Supreme Court. He was sworn into the new position on 2 October 2017. He retired from the Supreme Court on 6 June 2018.

== Other appointments ==
In October 2012, the Chancellor of the University of Oxford, Chris Patten, appointed Lord Mance as High Steward of the University of Oxford, on the retirement of The Lord Brown of Eaton-under-Heywood. He served in this position until 2018. He is an honorary fellow of University College, and Visitor of St Cross College, Oxford. In 2013 he received an honorary doctorate from Canterbury Christ Church University. He is the former Chief Justice of the Astana International Financial Centre Court, an adjudicative and arbitration centre based in Kazakhstan.

He serves as an international judge on the Singapore International Commercial Court.

== Selected cases ==
- The Public Prosecution Service v William Elliott, Robert McKee [2013] UKSC 32

== Personal life ==
He is married to Lady Arden of Heswall, herself a former Justice of the Supreme Court of the United Kingdom; the two are the first married couple to serve concurrently in the Court of Appeal or consecutively in the Supreme Court. They have two daughters and a son, Henry, who is the chief features writer of the Financial Times. Lord Mance's interests include tennis, languages and music.

== Notes ==
Legal offices
Preceded by The Baroness Hale of Richmond	Deputy President of the Supreme Court of the United Kingdom; 2017–2018	Succeeded by Lord Reed
