= Women in Criminal Law =

Organisation to support women in the legal profession

- Nickname: WICL
- Formation: 2018
- Founder: Katy Thorne QC
- Services: Mentorship
- Treasurer: Perveen Hill
- Secretary: Aileen Colhourn
- Patron: Heather Hallett, Baroness Hallett
- Website: Official website

Women In Criminal Law (WICL) is an organisation founded in 2018 to promote and support women in the legal profession, both defence and prosecution. It was founded by Katy Thorne QC following concerns that too few women reached top appointments in law.

== History ==
WICL was set up by Katy Thorne QC, following concerns that too few women reached top appointments in criminal law. Heather Hallett, then Vice-President of the Court of Appeal Criminal Division, is the patron. Mrs Justice Bobbie Cheema-Grubb joined because "excellent, experienced lawyers are leaving the profession". Other founding members include Alison Saunders.

== Initiatives and events ==
The organisation set up mentoring schemes, where small groups of women are connected with a female judge.

During the COVID-19 pandemic, hearings dropped, many solicitors were furloughed and barristers’ finances reduced. In response, WiCL created an online "Corona-initiative".

At its first anniversary they celebrated the Sex Disqualification (Removal) Act 1919.

== See also ==
- Women in law in the United Kingdom
