= Benedetti v Sawiris =

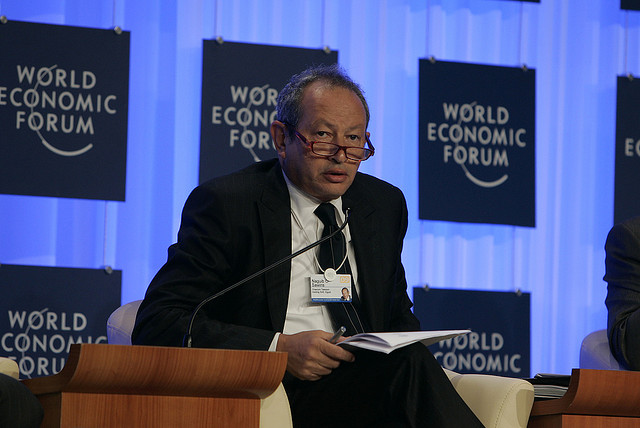
- Naguib Sawiris
- Court: Supreme Court
- Decided: 17 July 2013
- Citations: [2013] UKSC 50 [2013] 2 All ER (Comm) 801 [2014] AC 938 [2013] 3 WLR 351 [2013] WLR(D) 286; 149 Con LR 1 [2013] 4 All ER 253

Case history
- Prior action: [2010] EWCA Civ 1427

Court membership
- Judges sitting: Lord Neuberger; Lord Kerr; Lord Clarke; Lord Wilson; Lord Reed

Case opinions
- Lord Neuberger, Lord Clarke, Lord Reed

Keywords
- Unjust enrichment, quantum meruit

Benedetti v Sawiris [2013] UKSC 50 is an English unjust enrichment law case, concerning the method for determining the amount of a quantum meruit claim. It was decided by the United Kingdom Supreme Court.

== Facts ==
Mr Benedetti helped Mr Naguib Sawiris, as well as his company Cylo Investments Ltd and his family trusts April and OS Holding, to acquire an Italian telecoms company called Wind. On 31 January 2004 they drafted an ‘Acquisition Agreement’, however it contemplated a different way of doing the takeover. Mr Benedetti entered a brokerage agreement (through a company of his) by which he was paid a 0.55%, eventually €67 million. But this was merely for the job of brokering the purchase of shares itself, rather than the more general work of organising the takeover. Another company 60% owned by Benedetti got a €3.4m payment for support and expenses. On the remaining work, he requested a fee in May 2005. Benedetti wished to receive between €200m and €300m. He was told by Mr Sawiris' agent that no such deal was ever contemplated, but he would be offered €75.1m. Mr Benedetti wrote back that he was surprised, and "that in our venture i was a partner not a shity middle man" [sic]. They had further meetings but nothing was agreed, and Mr Benedetti sued for a quantum meruit for a fair value of his services.

== Judgment ==
=== High Court ===
Patten J in the High Court held that Benedetti ought to receive €75.1 million on a quantum meruit, taking into account the rejected offer. The acquisition agreement was disregarded since it was abandoned, and Benedetti was ordered to pay costs on a standard basis, and interest was declined. Benedetti appealed asking the Acquisition Agreement to be taken into account, that the offer should not have been, and asking whether there should be a brokerage fee deduction, OS Holding’s liability, the costs and interest decisions.

=== Court of Appeal ===
The Court of Appeal reduced the award in the High Court to €14.52 million. Arden LJ gave the first judgment. Although prior agreements could be taken into account by a court to determine a quantum meruit, the "Acquisition Agreement" should not because the parties' themselves had disregarded it, and a different acquisition was contemplated by it. Benedetti's services were to be valued the day they were provided, at the market price. The brokerage fee he had received should be deducted, as the Judge had done.

Etherton LJ gave a concurring judgment.

Rimer LJ gave a judgment, concurring with Arden LJ.

=== Supreme Court ===
The Supreme Court held that Mr Benedetti was entitled to be paid at the market value for his services. He was not entitled to a further share of the profits from the takeover deal. Lord Clarke said the following.

21. After the claimant has adduced evidence of the objective value of the benefit which the defendant received, the burden of proof falls upon the defendant to prove that he did not subjectively value the benefit at all, or that he valued it at less than the market price...

[...]

34. [...] in a case of this kind, (i) the starting point for identifying whether a benefit has been conferred on a defendant, and for valuing that benefit, is the market price of the services; (ii) the defendant is entitled to adduce evidence in order subjectively to devalue the benefit, thereby proving either that he in fact received no benefit at all, or that he valued the benefit at less than the market price; but (iii) save perhaps in exceptional circumstances, the principle of subjective revaluation should not be recognised, either for the purpose of identifying a benefit, or for valuing a benefit received.

== See also ==
- English unjust enrichment law
- Britton v. Turner, 6 N.H. 481 (1834) an employee who left work on a farm after six months, but had contracted to be paid $120 at the end of one year, was entitled to receive some payment ($95) even though the contract was not completed.
