= Futter v HM Revenue and Customs =

- Court: Supreme Court
- Full case name: Futter and another (Appellants) v The Commissioners for Her Majesty's Revenue and Customs (Respondents); Pitt and another (Appellants) v The Commissioners for Her Majesty's Revenue and Customs (Respondent)
- Decided: 9 May 2013
- Citation: [2013] UKSC 26

Case history
- Prior actions: [2011] EWCA Civ 197, [2011] 3 WLR 19

Keywords
- Duty of care, relevant matters

Futter v HM Revenue and Customs [2013] UKSC 26 is an English trusts law case, concerning the fiduciary duty to take into account relevant factors, and disregard irrelevant factors. It held that trustees who act on professional advice do not breach this duty, and that even if they do, the failure to have proper regard to relevant matters only ever renders a transaction voidable. For a transaction to be wholly set aside, as in common mistake, a decision by a trustee must be based on a truly "basic" mistake.

== Facts ==
Mrs Pitt's husband, Derek, suffered brain damage in a 1990 car accident, and became a patient under the Court of Protection. She was appointed to be his receiver under the Mental Health Act 1983. They were successful in getting damages for the accident, which were put into an annuity (although paid monthly) trust for his benefit. She settled the money as a discretionary trust, where both claimants and the first defendant were trustees. Neither she, nor advisers, considered liability for inheritance tax when they transferred the assets into a discretionary trust. Tax was charged after the husband's death on the transfer. She made a claim to declare the settlement to be set aside, because she failed to take into account the tax consequences, a material consideration. She would not have done it if she had appreciated the situation. The Deputy judge granted the declaration but would have, in the alternative, refused relief from consequences of the mistake. The Revenue appealed.

In the other case, Mr Mark Futter, the first claimant, settled two discretionary trusts, with himself and another as trustees, where he had a life interest and Mrs Futter, the defendant, had a reversionary life interest. The remainder would eventually go to their three children (the second to fourth defendants). The trustees exercised the power of enlargement so the first claimant became absolutely entitled to the fund, and then the power of advancement was used to give £12,000 to each child. This was to avoid capital gains tax on the settlement. But the legal advisers got the law wrong, and large capital gains tax liability arose. The claimants argued the enlargement and advancements were void, because they failed to take account of the capital gains tax consequences. The Judge granted the declaration and the Revenue appealed.

== Judgment ==
=== Court of Appeal ===
Lloyd LJ held that an act within a trustee's powers, but done in breach of duty (to take into account relevant matters, and leave out irrelevant matters) was not void, but voidable. Taking and acting on professional advice discharged the duty of care and skill, even if the advice was mistaken. Tax was a relevant matter. This applied to all fiduciaries, including a receiver under MHA 1983. Mrs Pitt had acted within the terms of the power, and so her action was neither void, nor voidable. Mr Futter's advancements had been within his powers, and there was similarly no breach of trust because he acted on the solicitors' advice, even though the advice was wrong. So that was not void or voidable either. He explained In re Hastings-Bass [1975] Ch 25 and overruled Mettoy Pension Trustees Ltd v Evans [1990] 1 WLR 1587 and Sieff v Fox [2005] 1 WLR 3811.

Doctrine of Mistake - To invoke the equitable jurisdiction for a voluntary disposition to be set aside there needed to be a mistake on the donor's part either as to the legal effect of the transaction (not as to its tax or other legal consequences) or as to an existing fact that was basic to the transaction proposed by the trustees, of so serious a character as to render it unjust for the donee to retain property, relying on Morgan v Ashcroft [1937] 3 All ER 92, per Lord Greene MR, and Ogilvie v Littleboy (1897) 13 TLR 399, 400. Accordingly, the mistake made were not basic enough.

Longmore LJ and Mummery LJ concurred.

=== Supreme Court ===
The Supreme Court dismissed the appeal from Futter and allowed the appeal from Pitt. The rule in Re Hastings-Bass meant the court could intervene if trustees failed in their decision making functions. A decision made within a trustee's powers was voidable only if there was a breach of duty to take into account all relevant matters, including tax. If trustees acted on proper advice, they were not in breach simply because the advice was wrong. Neither the Futter trustees, nor Mrs Pitt had been in breach of duty, so the court would not interfere with their decisions on grounds of inadequate deliberation.

Doctrine of Mistake - there was an equitable jurisdiction to set aside dispositions on ground of a causative mistake that was so grave that refusing relief would be unconscionable. The mistake differs from inadvertence, misprediction, or mere ignorance. Forgetfulness, inadvertence or ignorance is not, as such, a mistake, but it can lead to a false belief or assumption which the law will recognise as a mistake. The mistake's gravity would be assessed by reference to the facts, and the seriousness of the consequences (including tax). The court would decide whether it would be unconscionable for the mistake to be left uncorrected. On the evidence, the court was entitled to find in Pitt that Mrs Pitt had made a grave mistake in thinking that there would be no adverse tax consequences. The maxim 'equity does nothing in vain' did not bar granting of relief where the only purpose was saving on inheritance tax. The trustee could have complied with Inheritance Tax Act 1984 section 89 without any abuse, and so the trust would be set aside.

== See also ==
- English trusts law
