= Britton v. Turner =

1834 New Hampshire Supreme Court case

- Supreme Court of New Hampshire

Decided July 1, 1834
- Full case name: In the matter of David G. Blanchflower and Sian E. Blanchflower
- Citation(s): 6 N.H. 481 (1834)

Case history
- Prior history: Jury trial awarded $95 to the Plaintiff for services actually performed in pursuit of the contract.

Holding
- A hired laborer is entitled to compensation for work actually performed unless there is an express stipulation to the contrary in the contract.

Court membership
- Chief Justice: William Richardson
- Associate Justices: Samuel Green; Joel Parker; Nathaniel Gookin Upham

Case opinions
- Majority: Parker, joined by Richardson, Green, Upham

Britton v. Turner, 6 N.H. 481 (1834), was a case decided by the Supreme Court of New Hampshire that marked one of the first appearances of the contract law concept of guilty party restitution.

== Factual background ==
The plaintiff made a one-year employment contract with the defendant for labor for one year, from some time in March 1831 to some time in March 1832. The employment contract specified that the plaintiff would be paid $120 at the end of the contract period. The plaintiff voluntarily left his employment on December 27, 1831. The defendant refused to pay the plaintiff, and the jury in the Court of Common Pleas awarded the plaintiff $95. The defendant appealed the jury verdict.

== Decision ==
The Supreme Court of New Hampshire upheld the jury verdict. The Court reasoned that barring the plaintiff from recovering for the work that he had done presented a disproportionate forfeiture. If the Court did not allow restitution, the employer using a similar contract would be motivated to drive away the employee by mistreatment at the end of the employment period to avoid paying anything. The Court determined that such an employment contract should be viewed as accepting part performance day by day and that the employer should compensate for the benefit received.
