= The Public Prosecution Service v William Elliott, Robert McKee =

Public Prosecution Service v William Elliott and Robert McKee
- Court: Supreme Court of the United Kingdom
- Full case name: Public Prosecution Service of Northern Ireland v McKee (Northern Ireland) and Elliott (Northern Ireland)
- Decided: 22 May 2013
- Citation: [2013] UKSC 32
- Transcript: Judgement

Case history
- Prior action: [2011] NICA 61

Court membership
- Judges sitting: Neuberger, Hale, Mance, Kerr, Hughes

Case opinions
- The Supreme Court found that the fingerprint scans obtained by the Livescan electronic fingerprint reader were admissible evidence even though at the time the Livescan unit had not been approved by the Secretary of State as required by Article 61(8)(b) of the Police and Criminal Evidence (Northern Ireland) Order 1989

Keywords
- Digital evidence, Rules of evidence, Admissible evidence

The Public Prosecution Service v William Elliott and Robert McKee [2013] UKSC 32 is a case decided by the Supreme Court of the United Kingdom concerning admissibility of electronic evidence obtained from an electronic fingerprint reader unit that had not been approved by the Secretary of State as required by Article 61(8)(b) of the Police and Criminal Evidence (Northern Ireland) Order 1989.

On 6 October 2007 William Elliott and Robert McKee were arrested and charged for theft of building materials. Elliott’s left thumbprint, which had been recorded by the Livescan electronic fingerprint reader, matched a print that had been found on the packaging of the stolen materials. Both Elliott and McKee were convicted and sentenced to eight months imprisonment. The defendants appealed the ruling on the basis that the fingerprint evidence was not admissible, as the device used to record the fingerprints was not an approved device; they were subsequently acquitted. The Public Prosecution Service appealed the acquittal, which was then reversed by the Court of Appeal.

Elliott and McKee subsequently appealed to the Supreme Court, which concluded that Court of Appeal decision was correct and dismissed the appeal.

== Background ==
This case relates to the question of admissibility of fingerprint evidence obtained by investigating authorities using an electronic fingerprint scanner which at that time had never received the Secretary of State's approval for use, as required by legislation.

The law applicable is English criminal law.

== Facts ==
On 6 October 2007 William Elliott and Robert McKee were arrested and charged for theft of building materials. The defendants were found in a Ford Transit van located near to building materials stacked beside the perimeter fence of Aluminium & Plastic Systems (from where the materials had been removed). The defendants claimed they were in the area innocently.

The police noted grass clippings on clothing located in the van and also noted that the grass of Aluminium & Plastic Systems premises had been recently cut. The defendants were unwilling to account for the grass clippings on the clothing article and were subsequently arrested, and the van was seized along with the clothing article and a pair of wire cutters that had been found in the footwell of the van.

At the Police Service of Northern Ireland Lisburn station, a Livescan electronic fingerprint device reader was used to obtain impressions of the suspects' fingerprints. Elliott’s left thumbprint matched a print that had been found on the packaging of the stolen materials.

At the time of the arrest, the Secretary of State had not approved the Livescan device for use, as required by Article 61(8)(b) of the Police and Criminal Evidence (Northern Ireland) Order 1989 ("The Northern Ireland Order"). Article 61(8)(b) states "Where a person's fingerprints are taken electronically, they must be taken only in such manner, and using such devices, as the Secretary of State has approved for the purposes of electronic fingerprinting."

== Procedural history ==
The defendants were prosecuted at the Magistrates' Court, convicted and sentenced to 8 months imprisonment; critically the prosecuting authorities in making their case relied on the matching fingerprint obtained by the Livescan device.

The defendants, on learning that an unapproved device had been used to obtain their fingerprint impressions, appealed to the Craigavon County Court on the basis that the fingerprint evidence obtained using the Livescan device was inadmissible, as the Secretary of State had not approved the Livescan electronic fingerprint reader as required by the amended Police and Criminal Evidence (Northern Ireland) Order 1989 ("The Amended Order") that had come into effect on 1 March 2007.

Judge Markey QC acquitted the pair; however, the Public Prosecution Service (PPS) requested that the opinion of the Northern Ireland Court of Appeal be sought on the question of the admissibility of evidence in the event of statutory non-compliance.

== Law ==
The Northern Ireland Order is similar but not identical to the Police and Criminal Evidence Act 1984 (PACE) in force for both England and Wales; in both, Article 61 and Section 61 respectively deal with fingerprinting. The Order sets out the conditions under which fingerprints can be taken; namely that they be obtained under consent, or in the course of an investigation during which an arrest has been made for a recordable offence.

The Amended Order amended the Northern Ireland Order, inserting the aforementioned paragraph 8(b) into Article 61, which was then later repealed on 12 January 2010 after which there was no requirement for statutory approval of electronic fingerprint devices in Northern Ireland, England or Wales. However, whilst the amendment was in force, approval was only provided on 29 March 2009, a little over two years after amendment 8(b) came into force.

== Issue ==
Lord Hughes addressed the issue the statutory impact on the admissibility of the evidence obtained through the use of an unapproved device.

Ken McMahon QC for the appellants put forward that the wording of Article 61(8)(b) was clear and unambiguous; that an approved device must be used and therefore that evidence obtained through the use of an unapproved device rendered the evidence inadmissible.

The issue, as Lord Hughes stated, was that there was no specific provision for the consequence of not using an approved device, as there was in other similar acts such as Section 20 of the Road Traffic Offenders Act 1988, and similarly Article 23(1) and 4 of the Road Traffic Offenders (Northern Ireland) Order 1996 where specific provisions of the consequence of not using an approved device were stated.

Lord Hughes in his judgment addressed the admissibility of evidence, particularly when obtained through unlawful means; the intended consequence Parliament had in mind of not using an approved device; and similar provisions (and differences in process) for other devices such as traffic speed gun and breathalyser test devices.

== Admissibility of evidence ==
Under common law practised in the UK, evidence is not necessarily automatically inadmissible if obtained unlawfully. Lord Hughes refers to several precedents in this regard: Privy Council in Kuruma v The Queen [1955] AC 197, House of Lords in R v Sang [1980] AC 402 and in Fox v Chief Constable of Gwent [1986] AC 281

In general, the evidence if relevant would be admissible, even if obtained illegally. In this respect, Hughes cited the summary by Lord Fraser in Fox v Chief Constable of Gwent [1986] that:

It is a well established rule of English law, which was recognised in Reg. v. Sang, that (apart from confessions as to which special considerations apply) any evidence which is relevant is admissible even if it has been obtained illegally.

== Consequences intended by Parliament ==
Contrary to Ken McMahon QC’s claim that Article 61(8)(b) rendered the evidence inadmissible, Lord Hughes suggested the paragraph 8(b) could be interpreted in the following manner:

"the article still meant that a requirement by a policeman of a suspect in custody that he provide his fingerprints on an unapproved device would be one which the suspect was entitled to refuse"

Put another way, Article 61 outlines conditions where consent by the suspect is not required, whereas paragraph 8(b) suggests that consent is required in the event that the device is unapproved (and known by the suspect to be unapproved), and should the suspect therefore refuse on this basis, then the suspect would not "commit the offence of obstructing a police officer".

However, Hughes went on to say that "It is necessary to examine the question what Parliament must have intended to be the consequence of non-approval of Livescan", referencing the now less relevant mandatory and directory distinction and the contemporary focus on the intended consequence of non-compliance. This required exploring similar acts in place for other electronic devices.

== Provisions relating to other measurement devices ==
In doing so, Hughes highlighted a key defining difference between certain electronic devices used in evidence gathering; namely that breathalyser and speed guns capture a measurement of an activity at a point of time that cannot be re-captured again at another point in time. The consequence of using unapproved devices where measurements of an activity cannot be recaptured is that the evidence gathered is inadmissible; whereas in the case of a fingerprint reader, the measurement of the suspect’s fingerprints, if contested, can be retaken at any point of time.

Lord Hughes concluded that the evidence was therefore admissible, and that the appellants' appeal should be dismissed.

that Parliament did not intend, by enacting article 61(8B), that the consequence of an absence of approval should be to render inadmissible any fingerprints produced electronically. The decision of the Court of Appeal that the evidence of Elliott's control fingerprints was admissible was correct. It follows that this appeal must be dismissed

== Commentary ==
This case clarifies that evidence obtained using certain devices at the time lacking approval, even if there is a statutory requirement for them to be approved, is not automatically inadmissible. However, this is predicated on the nature of the activity and measurement being taken, namely that it must be possible to recapture the same measurement of the activity: a fingerprint impression can be recaptured, but not a measurement of the speed of a car, or a measurement with a breathalyser that formed the basis of a prosecution in the first instance. This raises issues in relation to the increasing use of electronic or digital tools in the capture of evidence, in view of the fast pace of change, the proliferation of technologies and procedures, and the fact that certain electronic evidence (e.g. SSD Drives) may not be capable of being recaptured.

== See also ==
- Police and Criminal Evidence Act 1984
- Police and Criminal Evidence (Northern Ireland) Order 1989
- Policing and Crime Act 2009
- Public Prosecution Service
- Director of Public Prosecutions (England and Wales)
- Magistrates' court (England and Wales)

== Notes ==
See Statutory procedures for discussion on mandatory and directory meaning
