= David Kitchin, Lord Kitchin =

British judge (born 1955)

The Right Honourable Lord Kitchin
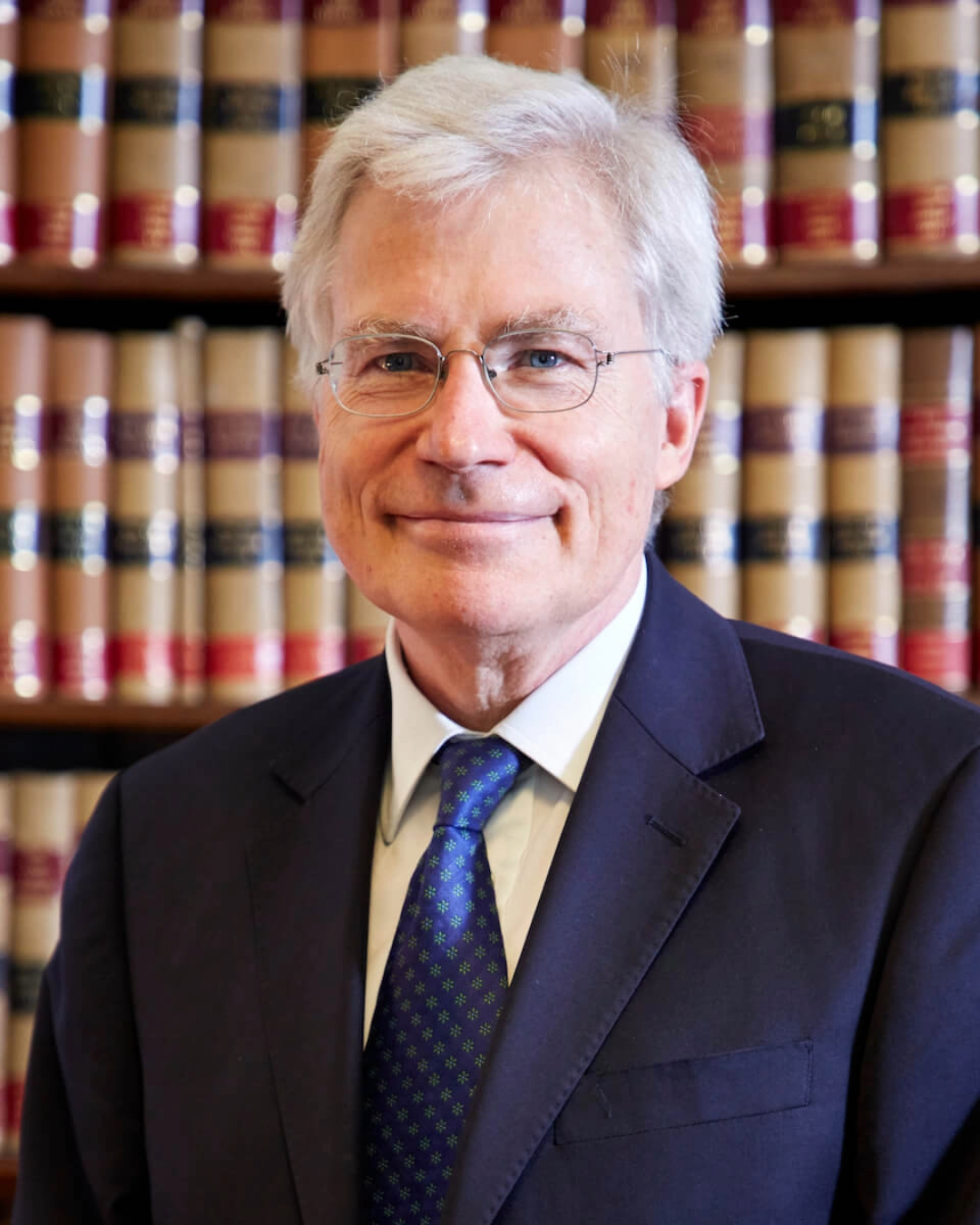

Justice of the Supreme Court of the United Kingdom
- In office 1 October 2018 – 29 September 2023
- Nominated by: David Gauke
- Appointed by: Elizabeth II
- Preceded by: Lord Hughes of Ombersley
- Succeeded by: Lady Simler

Lord Justice of Appeal
- In office 5 October 2011 – 30 September 2018

Personal details
- Born: 30 April 1955 (age 70)
- Education: Oundle School
- Alma mater: Fitzwilliam College, Cambridge

David James Tyson Kitchin, Lord Kitchin, PC (born 30 April 1955) is a British judge who served as a Justice of the Supreme Court of the United Kingdom from 2018 to 2023. He has also served as a Lord Justice of Appeal from 2011 to 2018.

== Career ==
Having attended Oundle School and studied Natural Sciences as an undergraduate at Fitzwilliam College, Cambridge, Kitchin switched to Law in his final year and was called to the Bar (Gray's Inn) in 1977; he has been a bencher since 2003. During his university days, he also coxed the Cambridge team that won the 1975 Boat Race.

Kitchin became a Queen's Counsel in 1994. In 2001, he was appointed a Deputy High Court Judge. He was appointed to the High Court of Justice on 3 October 2005 and assigned to the Chancery Division; he was knighted in the same year. Kitchin has served as Chancery Supervising Judge for the Wales, Western and Midland Circuits since 2009. In 2011, he was appointed a Lord Justice of Appeal effective 5 October 2011, and received the customary appointment to the Privy Council.

Kitchin became a Justice of the Supreme Court of the United Kingdom (UKSC) on 1 October 2018, taking the judicial courtesy title of Lord Kitchin. He served at the UKSC until his retirement on 29 September 2023.
