= Anthony Hughes, Lord Hughes of Ombersley =

English judge (born 1948)

The Right Honourable Lord Hughes of Ombersley PC HonFRS
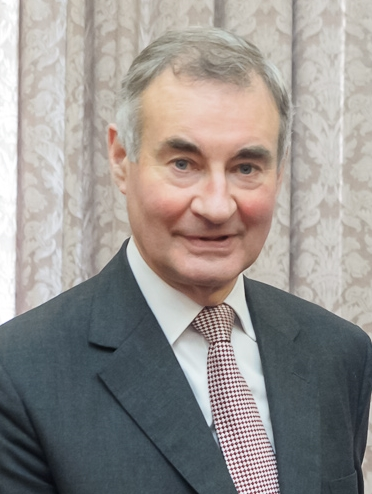

Justice of the Supreme Court of the United Kingdom
- In office 9 April 2013 – 11 August 2018
- Nominated by: Chris Grayling
- Monarch: Elizabeth II
- Preceded by: The Lord Dyson
- Succeeded by: The Lord Kitchin

Vice President of the Criminal Division of the Court of Appeal
- In office 3 February 2009 – 9 April 2013
- Preceded by: Lord Justice Latham
- Succeeded by: Lady Justice Hallett

Lord Justice of Appeal
- In office 24 April 2006 – 9 April 2013

Justice of the High Court
- In office 1997–2006

Personal details
- Born: Anthony Philip Gilson Hughes; 11 August 1948 (age 77) St Albans, Hertfordshire, England
- Education: Tettenhall College
- Alma mater: Van Mildert College, Durham
- Occupation: Judge

Anthony Philip Gilson Hughes, Lord Hughes of Ombersley (born 11 August 1948 in St Albans, Hertfordshire) is a former English judge of the Supreme Court of the United Kingdom. He was previously a Lord Justice of Appeal and Vice-President of the Criminal Division from 2009, following the retirement of Lord Justice Latham, to 9 April 2013.

== Education and early life ==
He was born to Patrick and Patricia Hughes. He was educated at Tettenhall College and obtained a BA degree in law from Van Mildert College, University of Durham. He was made an honorary fellow of the college in 2015.

== Career ==
He was called to the Bar (Inner Temple) in 1970. He was a Crown Court Recorder from 1985 to 1997, being Head of Chambers until 1997 of No.1 Fountain Court Chambers, Birmingham. He was knighted in 1997. He was appointed a Queen's Counsel in 1990, and a judge of the High Court of Justice, Family Division, from 1997 to 2003. He served as Presiding Judge on the Midland Circuit from 2000 to 2003, and transferred to the Queen's Bench Division from 2004 to 2006.

On 9 April 2013, he was appointed a Justice of the Supreme Court of the United Kingdom. By Royal Warrant, all members of the Supreme Court, even if they do not hold a peerage, are entitled to the judicial courtesy title "Lord" for life. Hughes was granted the judicial courtesy title Lord Hughes of Ombersley, referencing Ombersley in Worcestershire. He retired from office on 11 August 2018, upon reaching the age of 70.

== Personal life ==
In 1972, he married Susan March. They have a son and a daughter.

== Selected cases ==
- The Public Prosecution Service v William Elliott and Robert McKee [2013] UKSC 32

== See also ==
- List of judges of the Supreme Court of the United Kingdom
- List of Lord Justices of Appeal
- List of Durham University people
