= David Latham =

British judge

The Right Honourable Sir David Latham

Lord Justice of Appeal
- In office 2000–2009
- Monarch: Queen Elizabeth II

Chairman of the Parole Board for England and Wales
- In office 2009–2012

Personal details
- Born: 18 September 1942 (age 83) Blagdon, Somerset, England
- Occupation: Judge
- Profession: Barrister

Sir David Nicholas Ramsay Latham, PC (born 18 September 1942) is a retired British judge who was Lord Justice of Appeal and Chairman of the Parole Board for England and Wales.

Latham is the son of Robert Latham (1912–1995), editor of the diary of Samuel Pepys, and his first wife, Eileen Ramsay (d. 1969). He was educated at Bryanston School and Queens' College, Cambridge.

Latham was vice-president of the Court of Appeal (Criminal Division) from 2006 until his retirement from the bench in February 2009. He was appointed a Lord Justice of Appeal in 2000, having been a High Court Judge since 1992. He was called to the Bar in 1964 and made a Bencher in 1989. He was appointed Queen's Counsel in 1985.

He was Presiding Judge for the Midland and Oxford Circuit 1995–99, and a Member of the General Council of the Bar 1987–92. He was a Recorder 1983–92, and a member of the Judicial Studies Board 1988–91.

Legal offices
Preceded by Sir Duncan Nichol	Chairman of the Parole Board (England & Wales); 2009–2012	Succeeded by Sir David Calvert-Smith
