= H. Osborne Mance =

British transportation adviser (1875–1966)

Brigadier-General Sir H. Osborne Mance KBE CB CMG DSO
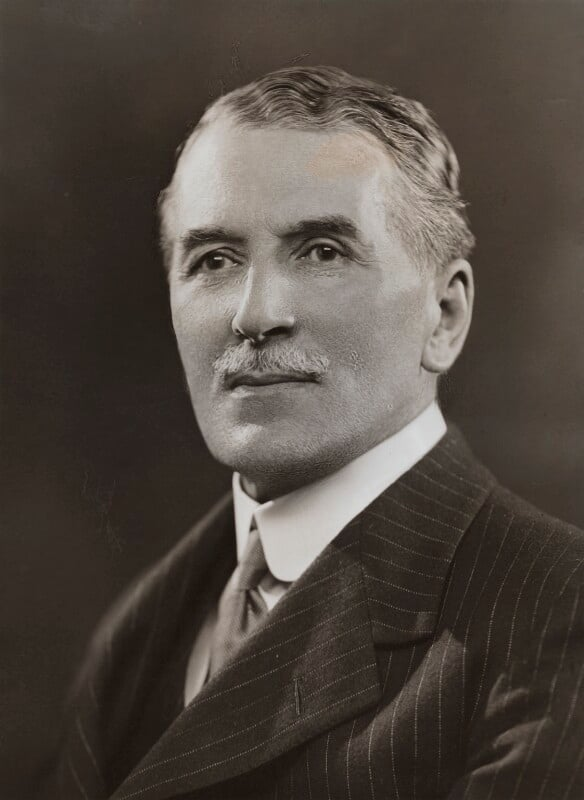
- Mance in 1936
- Born: 2 October 1875; Karachi
- Died: 30 August 1966 (aged 90); London
- Military career
- Allegiance: United Kingdom
- Branch: British Army
- Rank: Brigadier-General
- Unit: Royal Engineers
- Conflicts: Second Boer War, First World War
- Awards: KBE, CB, CMG, DSO

Brigadier-General Sir Harry Osborne Mance, KBE, CB, CMG, DSO (2 October 1875 – 30 August 1966) was a senior British Army officer during the First World War, transportation expert and author.

== Biography ==
Harry Osborne Mance was born in Karachi on 2 October 1875, the son of Henry Christopher Mance, inventor of the heliograph and was educated at Bedford School, between 1884 and 1893, and at the Royal Military Academy, Woolwich.

He received his first commission as a second lieutenant in the Royal Engineers in March 1895, was promoted to lieutenant on 15 March 1898, and served during the Second Boer War, between 1899 and 1902, as Deputy Assistant Director of Railways and Armoured Trains on the Kimberley line. He stayed in South Africa throughout the war, which formally ended in June 1902 after the Peace of Vereeniging, and left Cape Town for home on the SS Britannic in early October that year. For his service in the war, he was appointed a Companion of the Distinguished Service Order (DSO) in the October 1902 South African honours list. He was an engineer during the construction of the Baro-Kano Railway, between 1908 and 1911.

He served during the First World War, between 1914 and 1918, and was Director of Railways, Light Railways and Roads at the War Office, between 1916 and 1920. He was Transportation Adviser to the British Delegation during the Paris Peace Conference, between 1919 and 1920.

He retired from the British Army in 1924, and was appointed British Director of Deutsche Reichsbahn, between 1925 and 1930. He was author of reports on Austrian Federal Railways, in 1933, and on the co-ordination of transportation in East Africa, in 1936. He was Director of Canals at the Ministry of War Transport, between 1941 and 1944, British Representative on the Transport and Communications Commission of the United Nations, between 1946 and 1954, British Delegate on the Central Commission for Navigation on the Rhine, between 1946 and 1957, and was appointed as President of the Institute of Transport in 1949.

Brigadier general Sir Harry Osborne Mance was appointed a Companion of the Distinguished Service Order in 1902, a Companion of the Order of St Michael and St George in 1917, a Companion of the Order of the Bath in 1918, and a Knight Commander of the Order of the British Empire in 1929.

He died in London on 30 August 1966, aged 90. He had married Elsie Stenhouse and had two sons and a daughter. His elder son, Henry Stenhouse Mance, became chairman of Lloyd's of London.

== Publications ==
- The Road and Rail Transport Problem, 1940
- International Telecommunications, 1943
- International Air Transport, 1943
- International River and Canal Transport, 1944
- International Sea Transport, 1945
- International Road Transport and Miscellaneous, 1946
- Frontiers, Peace Treaties and International Organisation for Transport, 1946
