= Henry Christopher Mance =

British electrical engineer

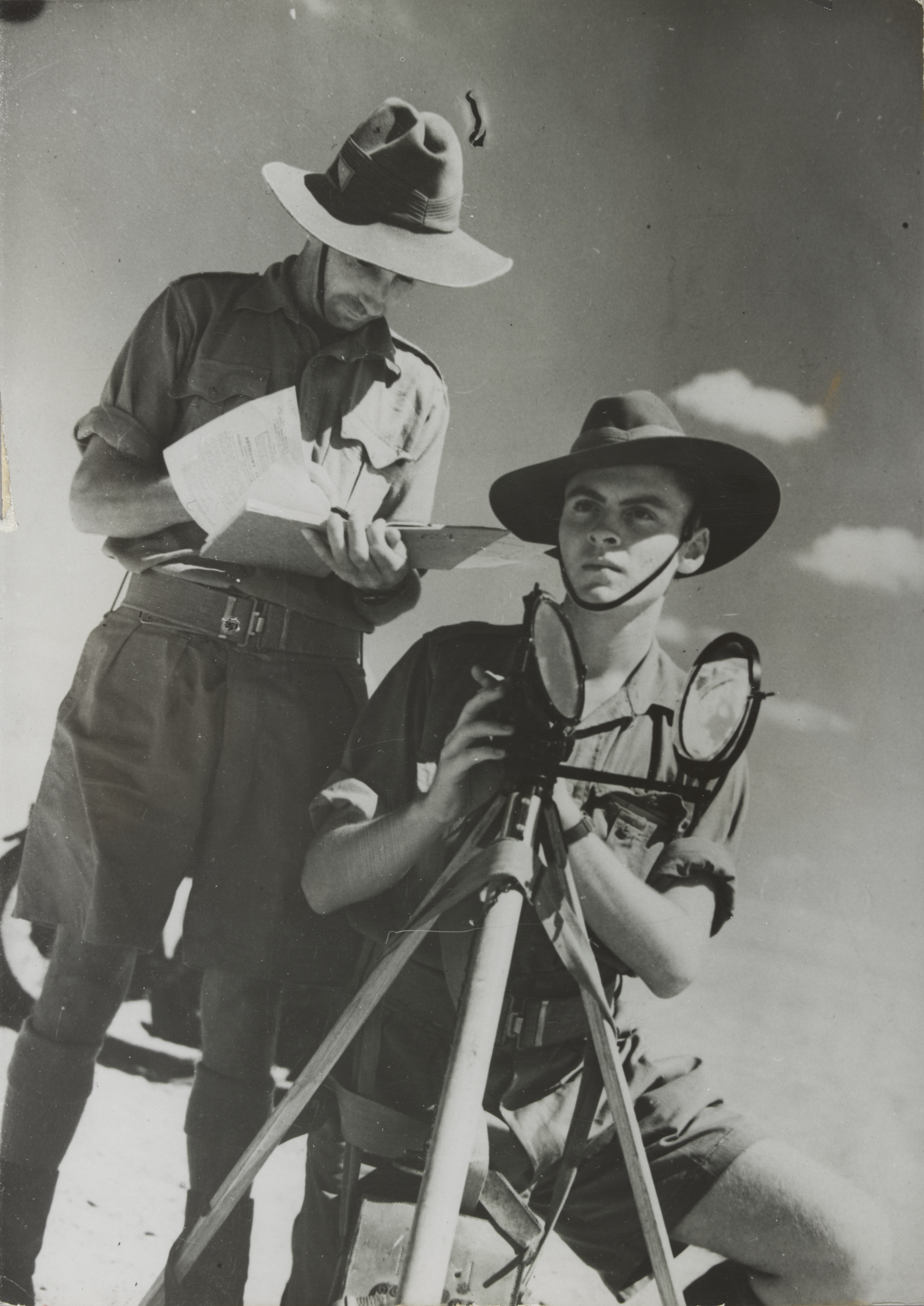
Australian soldiers using a Mance heliograph in 1940

Sir Henry Christopher Mance, CIE (6 September 1840 – 21 April 1926) was a British electrical engineer and a former president of the Institution of Electrical Engineers. He was knighted for developing the heliograph.

== Career ==
Born in Exeter, he was educated privately.

He joined the Persian Gulf Telegraph Department in 1863, and was employed on the laying of the first Persian Gulf submarine communications cable. In 1879, he was appointed electrician to the Department, which position he held throughout his working life. An inventive man, he was responsible for a number of important developments in the field of cable laying, testing and usage.

In 1869 he invented the heliograph, a wireless solar telegraph that signals by flashes of sunlight using Morse code reflected by a mirror. The flashes were produced by momentarily pivoting the mirror. Frustrated by Government lack of interest, he sent a number of his instruments to Lord Roberts for use during the second Afghan War, where the practical value of the invention was realised. It was subsequently adopted by military services worldwide and was still being used in World War II.

He was Vice-President of the Institution of Electrical Engineers from 1892 to 1896 and elected President in 1897. He was also a member of the Institution of Civil Engineers and the Physical Society.

== Later life, death and family ==
He retired in 1885 but continued his interest in Electrical Engineering as Chairman of the Oxford Electric Company and board member of several other electrical companies. Practically blind for the last 10 years of his life, he learned to read Braille.

He died in 1926 and is buried in Wolvercote Cemetery, Oxford. He had married Annie Sayer in 1874, and had three sons and two daughters. One son was Brigadier-General Henry Osborne Mance.

== Recognition ==
He was created a C.I.E. in 1883 and made a Knight Bachelor in 1885.
