= Nondelegable obligation =

Legal obligation which cannot be delegated

A nondelegable obligation (also known as a non-delegable duty) is a legal obligation or duty which cannot legally be delegated or, if delegated, the principal is still liable for said obligation. They are also known as non-assignable duties or obligations. These obligations cannot be delegated due to stipulations of public policy, statute, or common law. Nondelegation can also be written into a contract even when it otherwise would not apply. There are many types of automatically nondelegable obligations, including those involving trained professionals and those with a medical or fiduciary duty. Political duties are also often considered nondelegable. When an obligation is nondelegable, the obligee is entitled to specific performance by the obligor.

== Definition and related legal concepts ==
The specific definition of nondelegable obligations depends on the specific municipality. It is a compound term consisting of two sub-terms: delegate and obligation. To delegate is to "To hand over or assign responsibility to another, such as a subordinate in a business". Obligation is more loosely defined, with several common use and legal definitions. Most broadly, it is "a duty to pay or perform". There are four common types of obligations in law: contractual obligation, current obligation, conditional obligation, or heritable obligation. These are not mutually exclusive and can all potentially apply to the same obligation. Thus, a nondelegable obligation is a duty to pay or perform, the responsibility of which cannot be handed over or assigned to a subordinate, business, or any other third party. The specific definition, as applied in case law, however, differs depending on jurisdiction. For example, the Florida Court of Appeals claims that "a nondelegable duty arises in situations in which for policy reasons the employer is not permitted to shift the responsibility for the proper conduct of the work to the contractor". The Supreme Court of Nebraska claims it means that "an employer of an independent contractor by assigning work consequent to a duty, is not relieved from liability arising from the delegated duties negligently performed".

Since every government, through statute, common law, or general public policy determines exactly which obligations are nondelegable, there is no single, concrete list of all nondelegable obligations. However, there are a few principles which are commonly applied to determine what is and is not delegable, especially within specific professional fields. The fields listed below and the associated nondelegable obligations do not amount to an exhaustive list.

== United States ==
=== Attorneys ===
As legal professionals with a fiduciary duty to their clients, attorneys are responsible for certain legal procedures themselves and cannot delegate responsibility to a third party. One such obligation is service of process, which is defined as the timely filing of proper paperwork and properly informing a client about said process. Courts have ruled this obligation cannot be delegated because "responsibility is so important to the community that the employer should not be permitted to transfer it to another". Some courts in other states, such as Maryland, have disagreed.

=== Businessowners and employers ===
There are some obligations to employees which an employer cannot pass on contractually to a third party. Notably, the responsibility for many Title VII provisions cannot be delegated. For example, an employer has a nondelegable duty of nondiscrimination, hire without regard to sex, and provide a nonhostile environment free of sexual harassment. In general, employers have a nondelegable duty to provide reasonable care in providing a safe working environment for employees. An employer or owner of an establishment also owes a nondelegable duty of care to customers and to maintain a reasonably safe place for said patrons. For example, a carnival owner has a nondelegable obligation to inspect and supervise obligations of a ride. The employer is especially liable under a nondelegable obligation when it is reasonably foreseeable that some harm will result to the employee or customer unless some reasonable precautions are taken. As one example, an owner of a ship has a nondelegable obligation to provide a seaworthy ship to passengers or other customers.

=== General contracts ===
An obligation cannot be delegated to any other party if so specified in a contract. The Uniform Commercial Code states that if one party has a substantial interest in having his original promisor perform or control the acts required by the contract then the obligation cannot be delegated.

=== Insurance ===
Insurers have a duty of good faith when dealing with the insured and this duty cannot be shirked by simply outsourcing claims or other procedures to a third party. This is due to the special nature of the insurer-insured relationship and the requirement of insurance to not be in bad faith.

=== Physicians ===
Surgeons cannot delegate the removal of foreign objects from a patient’s body due to the special relationship inherent surgeon and patient. Prior to a treatment, a surgeon must also positively identify the patient to ensure the correct procedure is done to the correct patient. This duty is also nondelegable as it is considered an inherent duty of the profession. Though it is often determined on a case-by-case basis, there are three general criteria required for a physician to assign a duty to an agent: the individual is trained and qualified for the task, it is an obligation that is permitted by law or custom to be delegated, and the task is directly or indirectly supervised by the physician. Given that what is permitted by law or custom can differ significantly by jurisdiction, what specific tasks can and cannot be delegated can also differ greatly by jurisdiction.

=== Political obligations ===
The doctrine of nondelegation is a principle that one branch of government, typically Congress, cannot delegate powers or responsibilities apportioned to it by the constitution to another branch of government. Similarly, if someone is elected to public office, the responsibilities of said position cannot be contracted to a different party. Voting is also inherently nondelegable.

=== Exceptions ===
The Federal government of the United States cannot be held liable for the negligence of an independent contractor even if an obligation is nondelegable under normal circumstances.

=== Legal implications ===
In general, the implication of a nondelegable obligation is that, should said duty be breached, the principal obligor is still liable for the entire responsibility which cannot be delegated—whether nondelegation is required by statute, common law, or public policy. For independent contractors, however, it may be more complicated. Generally, independent contractors are not held liable when executing a principal’s nondelegable duties as they lack privity to an injured party in the case of a tort. That is unless there is some overlapping obligation of the independent contractor independent of the principal. For example, a nursing home is responsible for death from adverse effects from a medication even if the physician who prescribed the medication also had a nondelegable duty of care. Additionally, the doctrine of strict liability means that, in some cases, independent contractors are not immune from claims of negligence even if some other party breached a non-delegable obligation. This can occur when some other nondelegable duty of the independent contractor which functions toward the same end is also breached. In some cases, a principal who delegated a nondelegable obligation to an independent contractor may still be entitled to compensation for negligence of the independent contractor. This means if a principal hires a subcontractor to perform a nondelegable obligation for a client and the contractor negligently fails to perform, then not only is the principal liable to the client for the negligence, but the subcontractor may be liable for their own negligence to the principal.

== United Kingdom ==
The Court of Appeal established in 2011 that the duty to carry out a risk assessment is a duty which cannot be delegated. A Ministry of Defence (MOD) employee had been injured at an event and sought compensation. At the court hearing the MOD sought to transfer responsibility for completing a suitable and sufficient risk assessment to the contractor who had supplied the event equipment and overseen its use, but the court held that such delegation would only be justifiable if the employer could show that they had satisfied themselves that the contractor had carried out a thorough risk assessment.

In 2013, the Supreme Court ruled that Essex County Council could not delegate its duty of care to one of its pupils to an independent third party. In the case of Woodland v Essex County Council, a child had suffered severe brain damage as a result of an accident which occurred during a swimming lesson provided by a third party. The court ruled that the local authority could be directly liable under a non-delegable duty of care, where it had failed to ensure the safety of the child in the pool. The authority did not own the swimming pool or employ the pool's lifeguard or the swimming teacher, who might (subject to a finding of fact) have been negligent, but the responsibility for ensuring that the child was safe remained in any case with the local authority. The ruling emphasised that non-delegable duties of care did not fit well with a fault-based approach to negligence, which is embodied in English law, and the formation of such duties is therefore exceptional.
