= List of judgments of the Supreme Court of the United Kingdom delivered in 2021 =

This is a list of the judgments given by the Supreme Court of the United Kingdom in the year 2021.

In 2021, Lord Reed of Allermuir was the President of the Supreme Court; Lord Hodge was the Deputy President.

The table lists judgments made by the court and the opinions of the judges in each case. Judges are treated as having concurred in another's judgment when they either formally attach themselves to the judgment of another or speak only to acknowledge their concurrence with one or more judges. Any judgment which reaches a conclusion which differs from the majority on one or more major points of the appeal has been treated as dissent.

All dates are for 2021 unless expressly stated otherwise.

== 2021 case summaries ==
Unless otherwise noted, cases were heard by a panel of 5 judges.

Cases involving Scots law are highlighted in orange. Cases involving Northern Irish law are highlighted in green.

Case name	Citation	Date	Legal subject	Summary of decision
Financial Conduct Authority v Arch Insurance (UK) Ltd & others	[2021] UKSC 1	15 January 2021	Insurance law	Determining that commercial insurance for "business interruption" during the COVID-19 pandemic did respond to the lockdowns.
R (on the application of KBR, Inc) v Director of the Serious Fraud Office	[2021] UKSC 2	5 February 2021	Criminal Law, Fraud	On the scope of extraterritorial application of the Serious Fraud Office, the SFO does not have the power to compel a foreign company to produce documents held outside of the United Kingdom.
Okpabi and others v Royal Dutch Shell Plc and another	[2021] UKSC 3	12 February 2021	Company law, Environmental Law	English courts have jurisdiction over claims by victims of oil leaks from pipelines in the Niger Delta.
T W Logistics Ltd v Essex County Council & another	[2021] UKSC 4	12 February 2021	Land Law	Registration of land as a green does not criminalize pre-existing activities and local people have to exercise their rights over a town or village green in a fair and reasonable way.
Uber BV v Aslam	[2021] UKSC 5	19 February 2021	Labour Law	Drivers for Uber were "workers" within the definition in section 230(3)(b) of the Employment Rights Act 1996, and were thus entitled to the minimum wage and holiday pay.
Evergreen Marine (UK) Limited v Nautical Challenge Ltd	2021 UKSC 6	19 February 2021	Mercantile Law	For ship collision avoidance regulations, the crossing rules ought to be applied wherever possible and strictly enforced because they tend to secure safe navigation.
Begum v Secretary of State for the Home Department	[2021] UKSC 7	26 February 2021	Nationality Law	The Home Secretary appealed an earlier decision by the Court of Appeal in the case of Shamima Begum whose citizenship had been removed and who currently resides in a detainment camp in Syria.
Royal Mencap Society v Tomlinson-Blake	[2021] UKSC 8	19 March 2021	Labour law	Care workers are not entitled to be paid the National Minimum wage for all the time that they were on a 'sleep-in' shift.
G (Appellant) v G (Respondent)	[2021] UKSC 9	19 March 2021	Family Law, Asylum Law	A return order in child abduction proceedings cannot be implemented until the appeal in any asylum claim made by the child or with the child as a dependant has been determined.
Asda Stores v Brierley and others	[2021] UKSC 10	26 March 2021	Labour law, Equal Pay Act 1970	Employees working in Asda's stores can use as comparators employees working in Asda's distribution centres for the purposes of an equal pay claim.
Balhousie Holdings Ltd v Commissioners for Her Majesty's Revenue & Customs (Scotland)	[2021] UKSC 11	31 March 2021	Value-Added Tax, Tax Law	BCL did not dispose of its 'entire interest' in the care home, which meant HMRC was wrong to claw back the benefit of a zero-rating.
Burnett or Grant v International Insurance Company of Hanover Limited	[2021] UKSC 12	23 April 2021	Insurance law	Considered what is meant by 'deliberate acts' in an exclusion clause in a public liability insurance policy.
Rittson-Thomas and others v Oxfordshire County Council	[2021] UKSC 13	23 April 2021	Land Law, Schools Sites Act 1841	Land granted to a county council under the School Sites Act 1841 for use as a school did not cease to be used for that purpose, and therefore did not revert to the donor's estate, when the school moved to a new site and the land was sold with vacant possession, with the intention that the proceeds of sale would be used towards paying off the costs of acquiring the new site.
Zabolotnyi v The Mateszalka District Court, Hungary	[2021] UKSC 14	30 April 2021	Extradition Law, European Convention on Human Rights	There is no heightened test for the admissibility of evidence concerning alleged breaches of assurances given to a third state.
Her Majesty's Attorney General v Timothy Crosland	[2021] UKSC 15	10 May 2021	Contempt of Court	The lawyer committed criminal contempt of court by leaking a draft of the UKSC's judgment backing Heathrow Airport's expansion plans a day before the ruling was officially released.
Hurstwood Properties (A) Ltd and others v Rossendale Borough Council and another	[2021] UKSC 16	14 May 2021	Local Government Finance Act 1988	Local authorities can sue two property developers over unpaid business rates.
Commissioners for Her Majesty's Revenue and Customs v Tooth	[2021] UKSC 17	14 May 2021	Tax Law	There was no deliberate inaccuracy in Tooth's tax return.
R (on the application of Fylde Coast Farms Ltd (formerly Oyston Estates Ltd)) v Fylde Borough Council	[2021] UKSC 18	14 May 2021	Town and Country Planning Act 1990	Oyston's legal challenge was made out of time.
Matthew v Sedman	[2021] UKSC 19	21 May 2021	Limitation periods	In a 'midnight deadline' case, the limitation period starts on the day rather than the following day and thus the appellant's claim was time barred.
Manchester Building Society v Grant Thornton UK LLP	[2021] UKSC 20	18 June 2021	Negligence, scope of duty	The Manchester Building Society could bring a claim for damages against Grant Thornton as a result of negligent accounting advice which ultimately resulted in MBS closing a number of hedges at a loss.
Khan v Meadows	[2021] UKSC 21	18 June 2021	Clinical negligence	
General Dynamics United Kingdom Ltd v State of Libya	[2021] UKSC 22	25 June 2021	State Immunity Act 1978	
Director of Public Prosecutions v Ziegler	[2021] UKSC 23	25 June 2021	Highways Act 1980	
Secretary of State for Health v Servier Laboratories Ltd	[2021] UKSC 24	2 July 2021	Causing loss by unlawful means	
R (on the application of Haworth) v Commissioners for Her Majesty's Revenue and Customs	[2021] UKSC 25	2 July 2021		
R (on the application of SC, CB and 8 children) v Secretary of State for Work and Pensions	[2021] UKSC 26	9 July 2021		
A and B v Criminal Injuries Compensation Authority	[2021] UKSC 27	9 July 2021		
R (on the application of AB) v Secretary of State for Justice	[2021] UKSC 28	9 July 2021		
Triple Point Technology, Inc v PTT Public Company Ltd	[2021] UKSC 29	16 July 2021	Contract law	
Sanambar v Secretary of State for the Home Department	[2021] UKSC 30	16 July 2021		
Test Claimants in the Franked Investment Income Group Litigation & Others (Respondents) v Commissioners of Inland Revenue (Appellant) (1); Test Claimants in the Franked Investment Income Group Litigation & Others (Respondents) v Commissioners of Inland Revenue (Appellant) (2)	[2021] UKSC 31	23 July 2021		
Harcus Sinclair LLP v Your Lawyers Ltd	[2021] UKSC 32	23 July 2021	Contract Law, Non-complete agreement, Restraint of trade	A six-year non competition clause included in a commercial non-disclosure agreement between two law firms was not an unlawful restraint of trade and therefore was enforceable. Solicitors' undertakings provided by limited liability partnerships do not fall within a court's inherent supervisory jurisdiction over solicitors and therefore are not summarily enforceable by the court.
Royal Mail Group Ltd v Efobi	[2021] UKSC 33	23 July 2021	Labour Law, Burden of Proof	The burden of proof in discrimination claims lies with the claimant, in this case the employee, who must provide facts from which a tribunal could draw an inference of discrimination.
X v Kuoni Travel Ltd	[2021] UKSC 34 (Note: The 2021 judgement in X v Kuoni Travel Ltd is a further judgement to the case heard in 2019 (X v Kuoni Travel Ltd (UKSC 34)) following a decision of the Court of Justice of the European Union)	30 July 2021	Contract Law, EU Law, Package Travel, Package Holidays and Package Tours Regulations 1992	The decision of the Court of Justice of the European Union determined that an employee of hotel which is booked through a package travel organiser is not himself a 'supplier of services' but that a travel organiser may still be liable for the acts of the employee if they constitute improper performance under the contract. Following this judgement the supreme court found that the deliberate acts of a hotel employee, in sexually assaulting a guest, constituted an improper performance of the tour operator's obligations and therefore the operator was liable for breach of contract.
In the matter of T (A Child)	[2021] UKSC 35	30 July 2021	Family Law, Liberty, Children Act 1989, Social Services and Well-Being (Wales) Act 2014	The High Court's inherent jurisdiction can be used to authorise the deprivation of liberty in order to keep a child safe from harm where no alternative route for safeguarding the child is available (in this case a lack of resource in the child care system). The court's may cut across relevant provisions of the Children Act 1989 when using their inherent jurisdiction in such cases and in doing so are not in breach of the European Convention on Human Rights.
CPRE (Kent) v Secretary of State for Communities and Local Government	[2021] UKSC 36	30 July 2021	Costs in English law, Civil Procedure Rules, Planning Law	Where defendants and an interested party each incurred costs of preparing acknowledgments of service and summary grounds then there was no general rule in planning cases limiting the number of parties that can recover such costs.
R (on the application of A) v Secretary of State for the Home Department	[2021] UKSC 37	30 July 2021	Sexual offences in the United Kingdom; Gillick competence	Test for a police force, when approached for information regarding a person about whom concerns are raised relating to their contact with children, is obliged in law to seek representations from the person before disclosing any information.
R (on the application of BF (Eritrea)) v Secretary of State for the Home Department	[2021] UKSC 38	30 July 2021	Asylum law	Review of Home Office's regime for determining the age of asylum seekers entering the United Kingdom.
Tinkler v Commissioners for Her Majesty's Revenue and Customs	[2021] UKSC 39	30 July 2021	Tax law	Review when a taxpayer is prevented from challenging the validity of an enquiry into their tax return by HMRC where both parties have proceeded, for nearly a decade, on the mistaken assumption that the enquiry was validly initiated by a letter sent to the taxpayer.
Times Travel (UK) Ltd v Pakistan International Airlines Corp	[2021] UKSC 40	18 August 2021	English contract law	When a party can set aside a contract on the ground that it was entered into as a result of the other party threatening to do a lawful act.
R (on the application of TN (Vietnam)) v Secretary of State for the Home Department	[2021] UKSC 41	22 September 2021	Fast Track Procedure 2005; Asylum law	Determined effect of structural unfairness in the FTA 2005 on individual appeal determinations.
Reference by the Attorney General and the Advocate General for Scotland—European Charter of Local Self-Government (Incorporation) (Scotland) Bill	[2021] UKSC 42	6 October 2021	Scotland Act 1998; Devolution	The UNCRC Bill and ECLSG Bill passed by the Scottish Parliament were outside its legislative competence; the Bills are to return to the Scottish Parliament for further consideration.
Ho v Adelekun	[2021] UKSC 43	6 October 2021	Civil Procedure Rules	Calculation of damages/pre-settlement costs.
Anwar v The Advocate General	[2021] UKSC 44	13 October 2021	Equality Act 2010; EU law	The government did not breach its obligations under the relevant EU directives to provide effective interim protection for successful workplace discrimination and harassment claims.
FS Cairo (Nile Plaza) LLC v Brownlie (as Dependant and Executrix of Professor Sir Ian Brownlie CBE QC)	[2021] UKSC 45	20 October 2021	English tort law; Civil Procedure Rules	The appellant's claims did not satisfy the CPR requirements; its claims are also dependent on Egyptian law.
R (on the application of Majera (formerly SM (Rwanda)) v Secretary of State for the Home Department	[2021] UKSC 46	20 October 2021	Immigration Act 1971	Appellant remains on bail in accordance with the original Bail Order.
Kostal UK Ltd v Dunkley and others	[2021] UKSC 47	27 October 2021	Labour law	Direct offers made to Unite member workers breached the Trade Union and Labour Relations (Consolidation) Act 1992, s145B(2).
Kabab-Ji SAL (Lebanon) v Kout Food Group (Kuwait)	[2021] UKSC 48	27 October 2021	Arbitration agreements	The arbitration agreement is governed by English law; there is no real prospect that the respondent was a party to the arbitrary agreement.
Crown Prosecution Service v Aquila Advisory Ltd	[2021] UKSC 49	3 November 2021	Corporate Crime, Directors' Duties	Where the directors of a company had exploited their position and were in breach of their fiduciary duties to the company of which they were directors (in this case by making a secret profit of $4.55m) then another company to whom the proprietary rights were assigned could seek to recover the funds from the directors. As the directors had acted in breach of their fiduciary duties then the proceeds from their criminal acts were held on constructive trust for the company of which they were directors.
Lloyd v Google LLC	[2021] UKSC 50	10 November 2021	Data privacy	Data Protection Act 1998
Alize 1954 and another v Allianz Elementar Versicherungs AG and others	[2021] UKSC 51	10 November 2021		Duty of seaworthiness
A Local Authority v JB (by his Litigation Friend, the Official Solicitor)	[2021] UKSC 52	24 November 2021		Mental Capacity Act 2005
Fratila v Secretary of State for Work and Pensions	[2021] UKSC 53	1 December 2021		Universal credit, social security rights, EU law and Brexit
R (Association of Independent Meat Suppliers) v Food Standards Agency	[2021] UKSC 54	8 December 2021		EU law, meat products, safety
McQuillan, McGuigan and McKenna, Re Application for Judicial Review	[2021] UKSC 55	15 December 2021		Human rights, and investigating deaths during the Troubles
R (Elan-Cane) v Secretary of State for the Home Department	[2021] UKSC 56	15 December 2021		Private life under ECHR art 8 and gender neutrality in passports
Maduro Board of the Central Bank of Venezuela v Guaido Board of the Central Bank of Venezuela	[2021] UKSC 57	20 December 2021		Foreign act of state doctrine
HM Attorney General v Crosland	[2021] UKSC 58	20 December 2021		Contempt of court
