= R (Kwik-Fit (GB) Ltd) v Central Arbitration Committee =

- Court: Court of Appeal of England and Wales
- Citations: [2002] EWCA Civ 512, [2002] IRLR 395, [2002] ICR 1212

Keywords
- Trade union, collective bargaining

R (Kwik-Fit (GB) Ltd) v Central Arbitration Committee [2002] EWCA Civ 512 is a UK labour law case, concerning collective bargaining and the statutory recognition procedure of Trade Union and Labour Relations (Consolidation) Act 1992, Schedule A1.

== Facts ==
The CAC appealed from a High Court decision that it had drawn the size of the bargaining unit incorrectly. The Transport and General Workers Union argued that the bargaining unit should be two separate units in London, under TULRCA 1992, Schedule A1 para 11(2), that the CAC should determine ‘whether the proposed bargaining unit is appropriate or some other bargaining unit is appropriate’. Kwik Fit argued that the bargaining unit should be company wide. Kwik Fit complained under Schedule A1 para 19B that the bargaining unit, if confined to the M25, would make management difficult.

The CAC, chaired by a non-lawyer, decided that the bargaining unit was workplaces within the M25. The High Court quashed the CAC decision. The CAC appealed.

== Judgment ==
Buxton LJ restored the CAC’s determination that the M25 was appropriate. Under para 11(2) the CAC’s job was to look at the proposal before them from the union. But then, the CAC was obliged to consider the need for the unit to be compatible with effective management under para 19(3)(a) with the matters set out in para 19(4). If the employer objects to the union’s proposed unit, the CAC has to decide whether that makes the unit inappropriate. But the CAC is not obliged to select among the most appropriate proposed to it. Here the CAC was entitled to uphold the union’s unit and reject the employer’s.

Latham LJ and Sir Denis Henry concurred.

== See also ==
- UK labour law
