= Stefanko =

Stefanko (Ukrainian: Стефанко) is a gender-neutral Ukrainian surname. This is a patronymic surname derived from the name Stefan, with the suffix -k and the ending -o, which is typical for the historical formation of Ukrainian surnames in the Ukrainian language. -ko is a common Ukrainian diminutive suffix, that signifies "son of" or "little". For example, a surname like Kovalenko indicates "son of the blacksmith" (koval). Notable people with the surname include:

- Frank Stefanko (born 1946), American photographer
- Olesya Stefanko (born 1988), Ukrainian lawyer and beauty queen

== See also ==
- Stefanko v Doherty and Maritime Hotel Ltd, UK labour law case
