= Royal Mail Group Ltd v Efobi =

UK labour law case

- Court: UK Supreme Court
- Decided: 23 July 2021
- Citation: [2021] UKSC 33

Case history
- Appealed from: [2019] EWCA Civ 18

Court membership
- Judges sitting: Lord Hodge, Lord Briggs, Lady Arden, Lord Hamblen Lord Leggatt

Keywords
- Discrimination, burden of proof

Royal Mail Group Ltd v Efobi [2021] UKSC 33 is a UK labour law case, concerning race discrimination and the burden of proof.

== Facts ==
Mr Efobi, a postman for the Royal Mail from Nigeria, claimed race discrimination after he applied for 30 technical jobs to suit his computing qualification between 2011 and 2015. He said it was direct or indirect discrimination, harassment and victimisation.

The Tribunal dismissed the claims. The EAT allowed an appeal as Equality Act 2010 section 136(2) was not, in its view, properly interpreted. The Court of Appeal reversed the EAT, and found that the changes to the wording between the Equality Act 2010 and prior legislation did not affect the burden of proof.

== Judgment ==
Lord Leggatt held that Mr Efobi had no claim since the Race Relations Act 1976, like the Equality Act 2010 section 136, involved a two-stage test. First the claimant proved facts from which a Tribunal could conclude there was unlawful discrimination. If no such facts were proved, the claim failed. Second if facts were proven from which there could be a conclusion of discrimination, the burden shifted to the employer to explain the reasons, and that race was no part. Mr Efobi’s argument that there was no longer any burden on the claimant to prove anything was wrong. A Tribunal had to consider evidence from all sources, and ignore explanations by the employer for treatment complained of. The claimant must prove, on the balance of probabilities, those matters which he or she wishes the tribunal to find as facts from which (in the absence of any other explanation) an unlawful act of discrimination can be inferred. The Tribunal was not wrong to not draw adverse inferences (that Mr Efobi argued for) from the fact that none of the actual decision-makers gave evidence.

14. The old provisions established a two-stage process for analysing complaints of discrimination. At the first stage, they placed the burden on the claimant to prove, on the balance of probabilities, facts from which the tribunal could conclude, in the absence of an adequate explanation, that an unlawful act of discrimination (or other prohibited conduct) had been committed. If that burden was not discharged, the claim failed. If such facts were proved, the burden moved to the employer to explain the reason(s) for the alleged discriminatory treatment and satisfy the tribunal that the protected characteristic played no part in those reasons. Unless the employer discharged that burden, the claim succeeded.

15. The rationale for placing the burden on the employer at the second stage is that the relevant information about the reasons for treating the claimant less favourably than a comparator is, in its nature, in the employer’s hands. A claimant can seek to draw inferences from outward conduct but cannot give any direct evidence about the employer’s subjective motivation - not least since, as Lord Browne-Wilkinson observed in Glasgow City Council v Zafar [1997] 1 WLR 1659 at 1664: “those who discriminate … do not in general advertise their prejudices: indeed they may not even be aware of them.” On the other hand, it would be unduly onerous to require an employer to disprove a mere assertion of discrimination. The aim of the old provisions was accordingly to strike a fair balance by requiring proof of primary facts from which, in the absence of explanation, an inference of discrimination could be drawn; but then, if that hurdle is surmounted, requiring the employer to prove that there has been no contravention of the law. As Advocate General Mengozzi said in Meister v Speech Design Carrier Systems GmbH (Case C-415/10) [2012] ICR 1006, para 22, in explaining the approach to the burden of proof taken in the European Directives which the old provisions were intended to implement:

“A measure of balance is therefore maintained, enabling the victim to claim his right to equal treatment but preventing proceedings from being brought against the respondent solely on the basis of the victim’s assertions.”

16. Authoritative guidance on the effect of the old provisions was given by the Employment Appeal Tribunal in Barton v Investec Henderson Crosthwaite Securities Ltd [2003] ICR 1205 and approved (with slight adjustment) by the Court of Appeal in Igen Ltd v Wong]] [2005] EWCA Civ 142; [2005] ICR 931. Further guidance was given by the Employment Appeal Tribunal in Laing v Manchester City Council]] [2006] ICR 1519, which was approved by the Court of Appeal in Madarassy v Nomura International plc [2007] EWCA Civ 33; [2007] ICR 867.

== See also ==
- UK labour law
- Stefanko v Doherty and Maritime Hotel Ltd [2019] IRLR 322 (EAT)
