= Royal Mencap Society v Tomlinson-Blake =

- Court: Supreme Court of the United Kingdom
- Citations: [2021] UKSC 8, [2018] EWCA Civ 1641

Keywords
- Minimum wage, sleeping

Royal Mencap Society v Tomlinson-Blake [2021] UKSC 8 is a UK labour law case, concerning the right to be paid when an employer constrains their worker's freedom.

== Facts ==
Mrs. Tomlinson-Blake and another care-worker claimed that they should be paid the minimum wage which included her time while she was asleep and still was required to be at her workplace semi-actively, simultaneously. She cared for two adults in their home, and when she worked at night she could sleep, but had to remain at work, without duties, except to ‘keep a listening ear out’, and to attend to emergencies infrequently. She received an allowance, plus one hour's pay at the rate under the National Minimum Wage Act 1998.

Under the National Minimum Wage Regulations 2015, regulation 32 stated that when a worker is required to be available at, or near an employer's place of business to do ‘time work’, this should be included in time worked, but with the exceptions for; (1) the worker being permitted to sleep during a shift and (2) the worker being at home. The worker is only to be paid when ‘awake for the purpose of working’. Borrowing the courtesy of the aforementioned law, Mrs. Tomlinson-Blake argued that having to "keep a listening ear out" meant she was working, and should be paid the minimum wage.

Tribunal and EAT held that she was actually working through her shift. The Court of Appeal held that there was no right to the minimum wage while sleeping under the NMWR.

== Judgment ==
Supreme Court dismissed the appeals, and held that the Regulations could not be interpreted to mean that people should be paid when sleeping, even with "a listening ear". Lady Arden said the following in her judgment.

12. The first report of the LPC was presented to Parliament in June 1998 (The National Minimum Wage - First Report of the Low Pay Commission (Cm 3976)). It contained a specific recommendation relevant to sleep-in shifts: see paras 4.33 and 4.34. The LPC recommended as the starting point for defining working time all time which a worker had to spend at his employer’s place of work, even if no work was available. This would not include time which a worker had to spend at some other place on standby or on call. A special rule was needed for those required to be on call and to sleep at their employer’s premises, and no distinction was drawn between types of work. The LPC recommended that:

“For hours when workers are paid to sleep on the premises, we recommend that workers and employers should agree their allowance, as they do now. But workers should be entitled to the National Minimum Wage for all times when they are awake and required to be available for work.” (para 4.34)

13. That recommendation was clearly intended to apply to all workers who were paid to sleep on the premises. When the President of the Board of Trade presented the First Report to the House of Commons, she explained the principal recommendations and recorded the government’s acceptance of (among other things) its other recommendations:

“The remaining Low Pay Commission recommendations deal with such technical matters as the composition and reference period for calculating the minimum wage, the handling of benefits in kind and its application to homeworkers and pieceworkers. We fully and carefully considered those recommendations and accept them in principle, subject to consultation on the practicalities and detail of their implementation when formulating the regulations implementing the national minimum wage.” (Hansard (HC Debates), 18 June 1998, vol 314, cols 508-509)

...

44. In my judgment, applying the approach explained above, the special rule for sleep-in workers (regulation 32(2) of the 2015 regulations/regulation 15(1) or, later, regulation 15(1A) of the 1999 regulations) is quite clear. The basic proposition is that they are not doing time work for the purposes of the NMW if they are not awake. However, the regulations go further than that and state that not only are they not doing time work if they are asleep: they are also not doing time work unless they are awake for the purposes of working. So, it is necessary to look at the arrangements between the employer and the worker to see what the worker is required to do when not asleep but within the hours of the sleep-in shift.

...

51. It will be apparent that several previous cases, such as British Nursing, have held that workers who were or might have been on night shifts are performing work (as opposed to being available to work) throughout the shift and that they are therefore outside the special rules in regulations 15(1) (later 15(1A)) of the 1999 regulations and 32(2) of the 2015 regulations.

...

55. I agree with the interpretation given by Underhill LJ in para 77, namely that it was inconsistent with the regulations to say that a person was working during a night shift when he was positively expected to be asleep throughout all or most of the relevant period. This holding represents the culmination of his reasoning process and his interpretation in para 43 of his judgment in terms of logic and grammar alone (which I have summarised in para 52 of this judgment) marks merely a preliminary stage in his reasoning process. This interpretation gives weight to the recommendation on sleep-in shifts in the First Report of the LPC, set out at para 12 above.

56. In consequence, I too, like the Court of Appeal, would overrule Burrow Down (see para 32 above). In addition, I would overrule British Nursing. I have summarised the decision in that case in paras 28 to 30 above. The fundamental feature of the case is that the employment tribunal held that the employees were working, and not merely available for work, throughout their nightshifts even during the periods when they were expected to be sleeping and calls which they had to answer were infrequent. In their concurring judgments on this appeal, Lord Carnwath, with whom Lord Wilson agrees, and Lord Kitchin all consider that it was not open to the employment tribunal to make such a finding and therefore the Court of Appeal was in error in accepting it. I agree. What is less clear, however, is how an appellate tribunal should have dealt with the case, given that regulation 15 contained the home exception. We had little assistance on this in submissions. Lord Carnwath and Lord Wilson do not think it appropriate to be drawn into this area. Lord Kitchin takes the view that the employment tribunal could not rely on regulation 3 (meaning of time work) and conclude that the employees were working throughout the night shift simply because they fell within an exception to regulation 15. I agree. The EAT seems to have thought that if the employees had to be available to take any calls during the night, they would be working as opposed to available for work (para 23), but, as these appeals show, that cannot be the test.

...

67. Mr Jones urges on us that we should take into account the fact that, by performing her sleep-in shift, Mrs Tomlinson-Blake enabled Mencap to perform its contractual obligations to the local authority which in turn was thereby able to discharge its statutory obligations. I would be prepared to accept that there would have been regulatory or other duties on the employer in the context of care provision to continue care provision overnight. In addition, Mr Jones’ argument is supported by an example given in a document entitled National Minimum Wage - Calculating the Minimum Wage issued by the Department for Business, Innovation and Skills in February 2015 (see p 31) as follows:

“A person works in a care home and is required to work overnight shifts where they sleep on the premises. The person’s employer is required by statute to have someone on premises for health and safety purposes. The person would be disciplined if they left the premises at any stage during the night. It is likely that the person would be considered to be ‘working’ for the whole of the overnight shift even when they are sleeping.”

68. However, this document is not an aid to interpretation of the regulations (the 2015 regulations had not then been laid before Parliament), and merely reflects the opinion of the Department at that time. No doubt that opinion was based on the cases which had then been decided. Accordingly, I do not consider that that document assists the Court on these appeals.

...

70. Mr Jones submits that even when asleep Mrs Tomlinson-Blake had to have a “listening ear” but like the Court of Appeal I do not consider that having a listening ear leads to the conclusion that she was working for NMW purposes. A worker must travel from home to the employer’s place of business, but it does not automatically follow that the travelling time falls within the calculation of hours for the purposes of the NMW.

71. Mr Jones also submits that the multifactorial test adumbrated by Simler P should be reinstated to determine whether a worker was working by simply being present, but there is no call to do so under my interpretation of the regulations. That test would introduce a considerable amount of uncertainty into the NMW rights of the sleep-in worker, a point emphasised by Mr David Reade QC on behalf of Mencap and by Ms Anne Redston on behalf of the intervener. That would be undesirable and not in the interests of either party to the arrangement.

Lord Carnwath (with Lord Wilson) agreed, and that British Nursing Association v Inland Revenue should no longer be regarded as an authoritative, but on the ground that the Court of Appeal could not properly have concluded that the employees were working for the whole of their shifts, and that it is unnecessary to consider the treatment of particular activities within that period [82].

Lord Kitchin agreed, and British Nursing Association v Inland Revenue further illustrates how a failure to interpret the relevant regulations as a whole can lead to error.

== See also ==
- UK labour law
