= Financial Conduct Authority v Arch Insurance (UK) Ltd & others =

UK Supreme Court case

- Court: Supreme Court of the United Kingdom
- Decided: 15 January 2021
- Citation: [2021] UKSC 1

Case history
- Prior action: [2020] EWHC 2448 (Comm)

Court membership
- Judges sitting: Robert Reed, Patrick Hodge, Michael Briggs, Nicholas Hamblen, George Leggatt

The Financial Conduct Authority v Arch Insurance (UK) Ltd & others [2021] UKSC 1 is a United Kingdom Supreme Court case determining whether commercial insurance policies for business interruption cover claims due to the COVID-19 pandemic and consequent lockdowns. The case has implications on disputed business interruption claims worth at least £1.2 billion and affecting 370,000 businesses, primarily in the hospitality and entertainment sectors. On 15 January 2021, the Supreme Court found in favour of the claimants.

== Background ==
To prevent the spread of COVID-19, the UK government locked down the country in March 2020, causing businesses to temporarily close, particularly in the hospitality and entertainment sectors. This lockdown resulted in heavy financial losses to businesses. Thousands of businesses submitted claims under insurance policies that covered interruption of business, but insurers denied paying out, saying their policies did not cover the pandemic.

Around 400 companies had submitted complaints to the Financial Ombudsman, claiming that they had been wrongfully denied payouts. Figures from the Association of British Insurers during the first lockdown in March 2020 estimated that the total cost of business interruption claims to be £900 million. Insurance cover varies between providers, with different policy wordings; some insurers stated that they don't cover diseases not explicitly named in the policy, other insurers stated that only local outbreaks were covered.

A test case was brought by the Financial Conduct Authority with the support of eight insurance companies, to test policy wordings in court and to determine what wordings could constitute a valid claim. The case was the first time the Financial Markets Test Case Scheme has been used, which allows bringing a test case to provide legal clarity on issues of general importance.

Discussing this situation in a Chartered Institute of Insurance podcast in May 2020, the Chartered Institute of Insurance president, a director of the NFU Mutual, Nick Turner (at the time sales and agency director, and subsequently CEO) stated that he thought this setting would have a bad impact on affected policyholders's welfare and mental health and said:

Trust is important everywhere in insurance...we have a product which is a promise essentially [I encourage] individuals to think about how they build or destroy trusts. ..I have written little essays about this that so many have found helpful... So many people's lives and businesses have been affected in tragic and possibly permanent ways... if you haven't written a policy wording very precisely to protect the insurance company and bring clarity to the consumer, then that is where the problems lie... we have to work to renew trust with certain customers [who feel they have not been treated fairly], it will be challenging this is going to run and run... we need to work... [to have a] better solution in place if your business has gone into incredibly difficult positions or even administration [because of a problem with cover] nothing is going to put a smile on your face...

== At first instance in the High Court ==
The case was initially heard at the Commercial division of the High Court of Justice. The trial took place over 8 days, between 20 and 30 July 2020 by a court of two judges. The 162-page ruling was given on 15 September 2020. Analysing 21 different types of policy wording, the High Court found substantially in favour of the FCA. The ruling did not find the insurers were automatically liable for all the tested policy wording claims. Instead, the regulator stated that each policy would have to be tested against the judgement to determine coverage.

In response to the judgement, the FCA said the ruling had "substantially found in favour of the arguments we presented on the majority of the key issues". The Association of British Insurers stated in response that business interruption policies "are not generally designed, priced or sold to cover unspecified global pandemics".

== On appeal in the Supreme Court ==
The High Court's decision was appealed directly to the Supreme Court, bypassing the Court of Appeal in a rare process known as a leapfrog appeal. The Supreme Court gave permission to an appeal on 2 November 2020.

=== Arguments ===
The Supreme Court heard four days of arguments, from 16 to 19 November 2020, considering 13 of the 21 types of policy wording considered by the High Court. The parties sought to clarify the interpretation of clauses which cover for business losses in cases of: a "notifiable disease" at or near the business premises; prevention of access to business premises due to public authority intervention; an estimation of business performance had the disruptive event not occurred.

On the disease clauses, the court held that while there was a variation across policies in the wording of these clauses, none of these differences materially altered their interpretation. Insurers argued that business interruption cover only covered local outbreaks of COVID-19. The High Court held that whether the outbreaks were local was relevant because business disruption had been caused locally, as a result of the broader pandemic. The Supreme Court found that the clause covers only occurrences of the effects of the disease, inside the specified geographical area.

Insurers argued that their business interruption policies did not cover unprecedented events or restrictions, such as the March lockdown in the United Kingdom, adding that payouts should be denied in line with strict interpretations of the policy wording. A lawyer for MS Amlin told the court only business loss claims as a result of COVID infections within a local, 25-mile radius of the insured property were covered, specifically excluding claims as a result of a nationwide lockdown.

=== Decision ===
The Supreme Court unanimously found in favour of the claimants on 15 January 2021. Nicholas Hamblen, handing down the decision, said "the FCA's appeal is substantially allowed and the insurers' appeals are dismissed." Michael Briggs, another Supreme Court Justice, said that the insurers' claims seemed, to him, to be "clearly contrary to the spirit and intent of the relevant provisions of the policies in issue", adding "it is clear from the use of the definition of a 'notifiable disease' in most of the relevant clauses[] that Covid-19 [when it appeared] fell squarely within the types of disease for which all the relevant disease and hybrid clauses provided cover."

Although only eight insurers were named parties in the case – including Hiscox, MS Amlin, QBE, Arch, Zurich, and Royal & Sun Alliance – the ruling provides guidance for as many as 700 policies from 60 insurers selling similar products, affecting up to 370,000 businesses. Labelled a "complex ruling", the decision is expected to guide decisions by the Financial Conduct Authority, the Financial Ombudsman, and the insurance sector, on similar insurance claims involving disease clauses, business access to properties, and lost earnings.

== Subsequent legal developments ==
It is widely accepted that the test case would not dispose of all questions of liability with one legal analysis of the cases saying in June 2021:

for a majority of policyholders, the end is not yet in sight... and it was always acknowledged that the Test Case would not be capable of resolving all outstanding issues in relation to Covid-19 BI coverage. For some policyholders, the issue of whether their policy responds at all to losses flowing from the pandemic and the UK government response remains undetermined."

The Association of British Insurers has also stated "[t]he test case does not apply to all business interruption insurance policies" and the Commercial Court is now managing coordinated cases to deal with the unresolved issues.

=== Subsequent legal authorities ===
The position now may be that authority of the test case to be used to decline certain policies is significantly undermined with the Supreme Court, the Arbitration and most recent High Court authority departing from the reasoning in the case at first instance.

This has resulted further litigation.

These have generally been favourable to policyholders and resolved against insurance companies.

==== China Taiping Arbitration ====
In September 2021, an arbitration in The Policyholders Specified in Schedule 1 to the Arbitration Agreement v China Taiping Insurance (UK) Co Ltd took place with Lord Mance as arbitrator. In this arbitration, citing Lord Neuberger in Arnold v Britton [2015] UKSC 36; [2-15] AC 1619:

"commercial common sense is not to be invoked retrospectively. The mere fact that a contractual arrangement, if interpreted according to its natural language, has worked out badly, or even disastrously, for one of the parties is not a reason for departing from the natural language."

and he found that policyholders previously held not to have had contacts that responded were in fact covered.

==== Corbin & King case ====
In February 2022, in the case of Corbin & King Ltd & Ors v AXA Insurance UK Plc (Rev1) [2022] EWHC 409 (Comm), the reasoning of the lower court for parts of the judgement that was not appealed to the Supreme Court was subject to significant judicial criticism and over turned in significantpart. This case cited China Taiping Insurance Arbitration with approval.

==== Greggs case ====
Greggs PLC v Zurich Insurance PLC, CL-2021-000622 had a trail in July 2022. Judgement in this case went in favour of the policyholders. The defendant insurance company therefore settled the claim.

==== Various Eateries ====
Various Eateries Trading Ltd v Allianz had a trial of preliminary issues will take place in the second week of July 2022. Judgement in this case was favourable to the policyholders.

==== London International Exhibition centre v. Allianz ====
The Court of Appeal has ruled against insurance companies in five linked business interruption cases stemming from COVID-19 closures. Upholding a previous judgment, the court confirmed that policies covering notifiable diseases "at the premises" include losses from national lockdowns, similar to policies covering a wider area. They also clarified that "Public Authority" advice includes national government actions. The ruling, delivered on September 6, favours policyholders like London International Exhibition Centre plc and other hospitality businesses.

== Current litigation and Industry and regulatory pressure regarding limitation deadlines ==
Multiple cases are emerging out of the legal landscape associated with this case; they are being handled as linked cases by the Commercial Court.

On 19 December 2025, trade bodies representing 155,000 businesses and legal firm Stewarts issued an open letter to the FCA, alleging that thousands of SMEs face a "gross risk" of being "timed out" by the March 2026 limitation deadline. The letter argues that insurers have benefited from "drifting litigation" and tactical delays, preventing policyholders from receiving compensation until after their legal rights expire. This follows the FCA's July 2025 report on claims handling, which reminded insurers of their obligations under the Consumer Duty to avoid causing foreseeable harm. In response to the mounting crisis there were calls for a dedicated debate in the House of Commons in early 2026, with stakeholders questioning whether the regulator should mandate a two-year extension to the limitation period.

=== NFU Mutual Class Actions ===
NFU Mutual became a notable focus of controversy regarding its handling of COVID-19 business interruption claims. The law firm indicated that once the full claimant group—expected to total approximately 90—is officially added to the action, it will stand as one of the largest, if not the largest, Covid-19 business interruption group claim filed against a single insurer in terms of claimant count.

Initially, NFU Mutual publicly declared it would not cover pandemic-related claims, stating a duty to remain solvent.

This stance, despite the insurer's Head of Reputation claiming to be focused on "empathetic" crisis communication, was widely disputed by policyholders, leading to significant contention.

Public scrutiny, including questioning by the House of Commons Treasury Select Committee, prompted a gradual shift. NFU Mutual eventually admitted it had made a mistake on home and lifestyle policies, and then invited claims for advanced bookings cancellations where it acknowledged some businesses might have been improperly advised.

However, the Professional Association of Self-Caterers criticized the disparity, noting cheaper policies paid out while more expensive ones did not.

Despite the UK Supreme Court's January 2021 ruling and a subsequent FCA "Dear CEO Letter" urging fair claim handling, NFU Mutual continued to dispute liability for many claims. This protracted refusal led to allegations of strategic delays, with critics like RLK Solicitors' Chris Guy claiming insurers were trying to:

Let the company go bust so the claim dies, or stall long enough to make it time barred.

These concerns were echoed in Parliament by MP Helen Morgan in June 2025, six years after the pandemic began, questioning NFU Mutual's progress on FCA recommendations amidst repeated litigation suspensions. Concern about strategic delay in thes matters on the part of NFU Mutual has been repeatedly raised in Parliament; in June 2025, MP Helen Morgan raised concerns in Parliament regarding NFU Mutual's progress in implementing the Financial Conduct Authority's recommendations from its January 22, 2021 "Dear CEOs" letter. Morgan posed a written question to the Chancellor of the Exchequer in the House of Commons, asking HM Treasury to comment on the:

"adequacy of the progress of (a) NFU Mutual and (b) other insurance providers in implementing the recommendations.".

Responding for the government Treasury minister Emma Reynolds MP said:

"Under FCA rules, insurers must treat customers fairly. For example, the FCA’s rules require insurers to handle claims fairly and promptly; provide reasonable guidance to help a policyholder make a claim, and appropriate information on its progress; not reject a claim unreasonably; and settle claims promptly once settlement terms are agreed. The FCA has robust powers to take action against firms that do not comply with its rules."

Morgan requrned to this matters early in 2026 with two furhtre written questionsn, asking:

"what assessment her Department has made of the potential impact of the March 2026 limitation deadline on unresolved Covid-19 Business Interruption claims."

and:

"what steps she is taking to ensure insurers do not use limitation to prevent small business policyholders from making claims."

The enduring dispute, particularly concerning "non-damage denial of access" extensions, has resulted in at least two live class actions against NFU Mutual: South Farm Limited and others (filed July 2024) and Innventure Limited and others (recommenced July 2024).

Policyholders, instructing Penningtons Manches Cooper LLP, allege the insurer is not applying the law correctly. While NFU Mutual claims "only a small number of customers" are involved, reports suggest up to 9,000 policies could be affected, with potential liabilities estimated in the billions of pounds, reflecting significant financial and reputational risk.

The severe impact on policyholders is highlighted by their testimonies, such as one stating, "They have quite happily taken the premiums for the last 15 years but the one time I need it I'm not going to get any help off them. It's disgusting..." Another lamented, "we reached for the comfort and the security of the longstanding relationship with NFU Mutual and it turned to total ash."

NFU Mutual's CEO, Nick Turner, acknowledged early on that the company would face "challenges with its reputation and relationships," accepting that denied payments could impact policyholders' welfare and mental health.

This perspective was echoed by chairman Jim McLaren.

The Financial Reporting Council (FRC) also reviewed NFU Mutual's accounting practices regarding these non-disclosures, underscoring regulatory scrutiny.

The case management was formally structured in late 2025, preceding the Case Management Conference (CCMC) set for 19 December 2025 [205]. Key to this structuring was a Consent Order issued by Mr Justice Jacobs on 21 November 2025. This order set forth an agreement between the parties regarding the submission of costs budgets, which were to be calculated based on the hypothetical scenario of a 3-day Trial of Preliminary Issues. Critically, this conceptual trial was assumed to rely solely on agreed or assumed facts, thereby eliminating the requirements for document disclosure or witness statements. The Court explicitly reserved the right to make the final determination at the CCMC concerning the necessity, scope, and timeline for any such preliminary issues trial.

=== Beazley Group ===
RLK Solicitors is pursuing Beazley in court over unresolved business interruption (BI) claims related to the COVID-19 pandemic, in a case called Daniel Watterson T/A Wottos Ink and others v. Beazley Syndicates 623/2623 at Lloyd's.

Chris Guy, director and head of business interruption litigation at RLK Solicitors, stated that Beazley's handling of these claims has been marked by delays and a lack of clarity, despite the legal landscape shifting in favour of policyholders following the Supreme Court's ruling in the FCA's BI test case in January 2021.

Guy highlighted that some Beazley policies describe coverage for "a public authority incident occurring within a one mile radius of your premises which results in prevention or hindrance of access to the premises," which small businesses interpreted as protection during pandemic closures.

He accused Beazley of deliberately stalling these claims, alleging they exploit time limits on legal claims, hoping businesses fold or give up. Guy stated:

This has been their tactic from day one. Let the company go bust so the claim dies, or stall long enough to make it time barred.

RLK Solicitors, representing all 69 claimants in the group action, is pursuing justice for what they argue is a breach of contract, aiming to hold insurers accountable and prevent small business owners from being forced into financial ruin. Guy further emphasized the severe human impact, with business owners experiencing delayed dreams, homes put at risk, and decades of hard work reduced to legal disputes. He noted that some have lost their livelihoods and, in tragic cases, even their lives due to the stress.

Sukhjeet Bahra, a beauty therapist from Oadby, Leicestershire, is one of 69 business owners participating in a group action against Beazley Syndicates after her claim for lockdown-related business losses was denied. She was informed that her policy did not cover a national pandemic. Similarly, Lauren Halley, owner of the Beauty Room in Eastwood, Nottinghamshire, also had her BI claim denied despite nearly 20 years of paying premiums. Both Bahra and Halley had to take out loans to cover their bills, impacting their financial stability and, in Bahra's case, forcing her to close her salon and operate from home.

The Financial Conduct Authority (FCA) has consistently urged insurers to reassess and promptly pay valid BI claims, cautioning against delays that could worsen financial hardship for businesses. Beazley declined to comment on the ongoing litigation. Guy also noted that some businesses, unable to withstand the financial pressure from delayed or denied payments, have already dissolved, preventing them from joining the litigation. Beazley's standard BI policies have exclusions for permanently closed businesses or those with appointed liquidators, which Guy argues could unfairly penalize firms driven to insolvency by the insurer's actions. The FCA reaffirmed its expectations for insurer conduct in BI cases in May 2025, emphasizing clear communication and fair settlements.

=== Ann Grimes t/a the Cleveland Arms and others v Liberty Mutual ===
In November 2024, a Case Management Conference (CMC) was held in the High Court of Justice (Business and Property Courts of England and Wales) concerning claim number CL-2023-000596, The One Hairdressing Limited and others v. Liberty Mutual Insurance Europe SE, and four other related actions. These linked cases were:

- CL-2023-000597, Miss Elaine Rafferty Trading as No 1 Cob Shop and Others v. Liberty Mutual Insurance Europe SE;
- CL-2023-000604, Mr Paul Wilson t/a Bolton Castle and others v. Liberty Mutual Insurance SE; and
- CL-2023-000733, Lignum Jones Limited and others v. Liberty Mutual Insurance Europe SE.

The claimants in these actions are represented by Barings Law, while the defendants, the Liberty Mutual Insurance entities, are represented by DAC Beachcroft.

Following an agreement reached between the claimant and defendant parties, the court issued an order for the determination of several preliminary legal issues. These issues include:

- The interpretation and application of a clause within the insurance policies that refers to the "discovery of a notifiable human or infectious disease at the Premises."
- Allegations made by the insurers regarding the late notification of claims by the policyholders.

To address these preliminary matters, a four-day hearing has been scheduled to take place in November 2025.

=== Alison Toulson (trading as Kaleidoscope) and 90 other claimants v American International Group UK Ltd ===
In April 2024, a Case Management Conference (CMC) was convened in the High Court of Justice (Business and Property Courts of England and Wales) for claim number CL-2023-000649. Barings Law represents the claimant, a collective of numerous small business owners, while Kennedy's Law LLP acts for the defendant insurer, AIG. The policy wording at the heart of this litigation originated from the broker, Morgan Richardson. The court has been made aware that approximately 50 additional policyholders, holding similar AIG policies with comparable wording and represented by solicitors RLK and Hugh James, also exist.

Drawing from an agreement reached in the related Alison Toulson case, the court had ordered a two-day hearing to address preliminary issues concerning the interpretation of the policy wording. However, the parties in this particular case (CL-2023-000649) have since agreed to a stay of proceedings, and the previously scheduled trial date has been vacated.

== Settled cases ==
Smart Medical Clinics Ltd v Chubb European Group, CL-2021-000472, has settled. Another case that appears to have settled is Altrincham Association Football Club v AXA, CL-2021-000733 (solicitors Fletcher Day for the Claimant, DAC Beachcroft for the Defendant) involves questions as to the effect of cover in respect of disease 'manifesting itself at the [relevant] premises' and what causative effect such cases have to have.

=== Midlands Components Ltd v QBE UK Ltd ===
In May 2024, a Case Management Conference (CMC) took place in the High Court of Justice (Business and Property Courts of England and Wales) concerning claim number CL-2023-000070, with Barings Law representing the claimant and Clyde & Co LLP representing the defendant. During this CMC, directions were established for a forthcoming trial.

The central legal question in this case concerned causation in instances where a business experiences multiple periods of loss within the insurance period. The defendant insurer argued that the policy could potentially respond to more than one instance of loss. However, this was conditional on each loss being demonstrably caused by at least one manifestation of COVID-19 within a 25-mile radius of the insured premises. Furthermore, each such loss would need to be a separate and distinguishable effect from other COVID-19 manifestations within the same radius that had already resulted in an insured loss under the policy.

The trial for this matter had been scheduled for May 2025. However, the parties have since reached a resolution to their dispute, and the previously set trial date has been vacated.

=== Arsenal Football Club and others ===
On October 12, 2023, a Case Management Conference (CMC) was held in a legal action initiated by several Premier League football clubs. The case encompassed a range of legal questions, notably concerning the limits of their insurance policies. Following the CMC, the court issued directions for a trial specifically focused on matters of liability. However, the involved parties ultimately reached a resolution to their dispute before the scheduled trial commenced.

=== Oaxaca / Flat Iron ===
In coordinated proceedings before the court, Case Management Conferences (CMCs) were held on October 11, 2023, for two related actions against QIC Europe Limited: Oaxaca Limited trading as Wahaca v. QIC Europe Limited (CL-2023-000284) and Flat Iron Steak Limited v QIC Europe Ltd (CL-2023-000349). Representatives for the intended claimant in The Fulham Shore Limited v QIC Europe Limited also attended.

The Oaxaca and Flat Iron cases presented a number of analogous legal questions concerning the interpretation of QIC's policy wording, as well as matters of quantum (the amount of damages). Some liability issues in the Oaxaca case were addressed through a summary judgment and interim payment application heard in February 2024 before Cockerill J ([2024] EWHC 394 (Comm)). The court granted summary judgment on certain policy construction points and granted permission to appeal those specific issues. However, the application for an interim payment was unsuccessful.

Following these preliminary steps, directions were issued for a trial to address the remaining issues, including the determination of quantum. Subsequently, the parties involved in both the Oaxaca and Flat Iron litigations have reached a resolution to their respective disputes.

=== PizzaExpress ===
In the PizzaExpress case, a preliminary legal question arose concerning how the "one occurrence" policy limit applied to the sub-limits within their insurance policy. A hearing on this specific issue took place on May 19, 2023, and the judgment was delivered shortly after on May 26, 2023 ([2023] EWHC 1269 (Comm). The Court of Appeal subsequently refused permission to appeal this judgment. Following these legal determinations on the preliminary issue, the case was ultimately settled between the parties.

== Reception ==
Since the issue was originally raised, insurance policies have been amended to explicitly state whether cover is provided for lockdown measures.

In reaction to the Supreme Court's ruling, Huw Evans, director general of the Association of British Insurers, stated that "the insurance industry expects to pay out over £1.8bn in COVID-19 related claims". Hiscox stated that only a third of its policies would have to pay out, at an extra cost of $48 million (equivalent to £35 million) to the company. The law firm Reed Smith declared the judgement "a catastrophic outcome for insurers".
