= British Nursing Association v Inland Revenue =

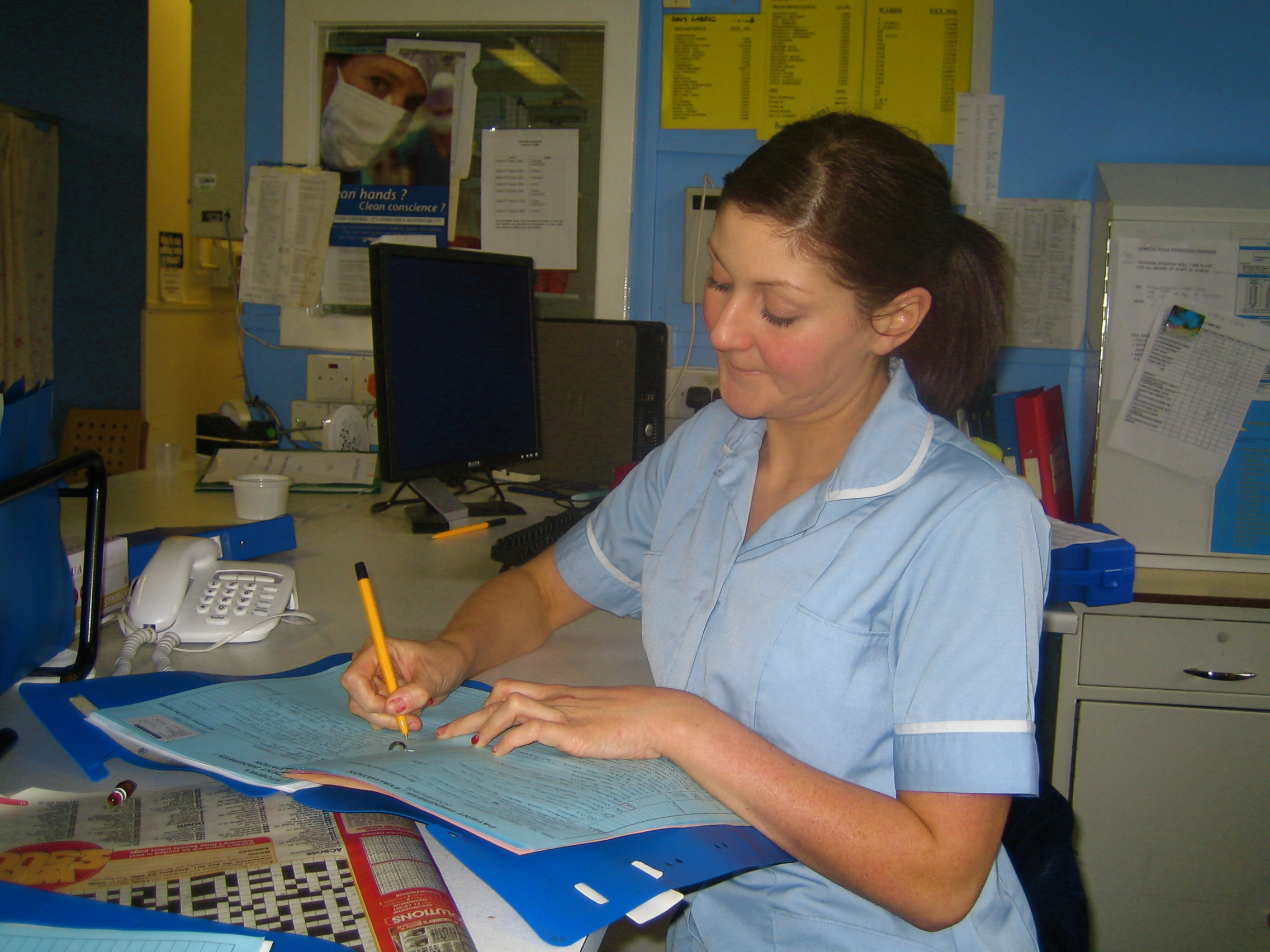
- Court: Court of Appeal
- Decided: 26 March 2002
- Citations: [2002] EWCA Civ 494, [2002] IRLR 480

Court membership
- Judges sitting: Buxton LJ, Peter Gibson LJ, Neuberger J

Case opinions
- Buxton LJ

Keywords
- Minimum wage, worker

British Nursing Association v Inland Revenue [2002] EWCA Civ 494 is a UK labour law case regarding the National Minimum Wage Act 1998.

== Facts ==
Workers were staying at home overnight, and would answer telephone queries. In between they could read or watch television. The employers argued that r 15(1) draws a distinction between work at home and work at an employer’s workplace, so when the worker was not working at home he should not be paid.

== Judgment ==
Buxton LJ held the workers were "working" even when on call, because ‘the alternative that is apparently contended for by the appellant, that the employees are only working when they are actually dealing with phone calls with all the periods spent waiting for calls excluded, would, in my view effectively make a mockery of the whole system of the minimum wage.’ Buxton LJ's judgment read as follows.

14. However, the main argument, raised against those findings, which seem to me at the very lowest entirely open to the Employment Tribunal applying to the facts its understanding and experience of industrial relations, was the argument developed before us by Mr Epstein that, as a matter of law, the Regulations made a distinction between work at the employer's work place and activities carried on - and I will use that expression neutrally for the moment - at the worker's own home. Therefore, the Employment Tribunal had erred in seeing a necessary continuation between the activities at the work place and the activities at the worker's home, and should not have found that the workers were working throughout the period when they were at home in the same way as they would be working throughout the period when they were at the employer's premises. As I have said, that objection could, in my judgement, only be based upon an objection of law in the face of the very strong implications of the facts that I have already endeavoured to set out; and the argument is, I fear, misconceived. It was based entirely on the construction of Regulation 15, which indeed draws a distinction between a worker being available at or near a place of work for the purpose of work, and that same situation when he is at his home, as the wording sets it out. But Regulation 15 only arises in a case where a worker is not in fact working, but is on call waiting to work. In this case, as we have seen, the Tribunal found as a fact that the workers were working throughout the period of their shift. Regulation 15 is therefore irrelevant to these facts; and, moreover, even if that were not the case, it is in my judgement impossible to construe out of Regulation 15 a rule that applies to the whole of these Regulations, that obliged a tribunal to make a different finding in respect of the nature of a person's activities with regard to work just because they were being carried on at the employee's place of residence. I therefore would reject the argument advanced to criticise the Tribunal's principal finding.

15. So far so good. Further difficulties, however, arise in this case from Regulation 15 itself, and the roles it played in the argument and in the statement of issues. As I have already indicated, I find it extremely difficult to say that this Regulation is relevant to this case at all. Once the Tribunal had found that the employees were in fact working throughout their shift, Regulation 15 only applied thereafter to situations of a particular sort in addition to what can be properly characterised as work; and on the Tribunal's findings the situation that they were addressing was not a deemed piece of time work but an actual piece of time work. That indeed was the view of the Tribunal itself, because having been invited to look at certain aspects of Regulation 15, it said this at paragraphs 33 and 34 of its determination:

"33. In the present case, the workers are paid to work at home and their place of work is at home. 34. We therefore conclude that the words in Regulation 15(1) of `available at or near a place of work other than his home' are not relevant to the present situation."

16. But both Tribunals were faced with the difficulty that the parties had agreed at all stages that Regulation 15(1) was indeed the governing provision in this case, and there is, and probably could not be, any cross-appeal as to the limitations on the extent of the employees' "work" that the Employment Appeal Tribunal drew, in the light of those submissions, from the terms of Regulation 15(1). It is however necessary to enter two caveats. First, I do not in this judgment decide anything as to the proper application of Regulation 15(1) in a case such as the present. Second, the difficulty that has been experienced in this case in interpreting Regulation 15(1) springs from what I would see as the artificiality of its applying to the present facts at all.

17. Regulation 15(1) relates to workers who are, in colloquial terms, "on call". When a worker falls into that category, he has to be paid the minimum wage for his waiting hours, unless he is on call at home. I respectfully agree with the very clear analysis of the Employment Appeal Tribunal to that effect in paragraphs 28 to 30 of its judgment. However, if the worker is permitted to sleep when on call, the hours during which he is permitted to sleep and when he is not actually working do not count as the equivalent of time work. The Employment Tribunal held that these provisions apply in the present case, a holding that as we have seen has not been challenged. I cannot conceal my profound doubt as to that conclusion. Regulation 15(1) is arranged as a single provision. The exception that it contains, introduced by the words "except that", is indeed an exception: that is, it presupposes that the case is otherwise covered by the principal rule of the regulation. That principal rule, as we have seen, is confined to cases where the worker is on call other than at his home. So where, as in our case, the workers are asleep at home, they are not covered by the exclusion because they are not in any event covered by the rule from which they appear to be excluded.

18. None of this should have affected the workers in our case, because they do not need the assistance of the Regulation to establish that they are working or deemed to be working. However, as I have said, the structure and history of the proceedings makes it in my view impossible to escape from the limitation imposed by the Employment Tribunal that the workers should not be paid for the hours they are permitted to sleep. On the facts of this case, that presents considerable difficulties of assessment, as set out by the Employment Tribunal in paragraphs 44 to 45 of its determination, which I think I need not take time in citing. Bearing in mind that it is for the employer to establish that the employee was remunerated at the proper rate, I have doubts as to whether the employer in this case will in fact succeed in excluding any period of sleep from the period deemed to work. That is inevitably a question for another day, in respect of which observations made in this court are not in any way conclusive.

19. Having said all that, the alternative that is apparently contended for by the appellant, that the employees are only working when they are actually dealing with phone calls with all the periods spent waiting for calls excluded, would, in my view effectively make a mockery of the whole system of the minimum wage.

20. The Employment Appeal Tribunal was asked to look at the Parliamentary debates in order to establish some sort of congruence between the present provisions and the Working Time Directive and Regulations. Mr Epstein showed good judgement in not pursuing that particular thread of his argument in this court. He did, however, say that the European Court of Justice decision on the Working Time Directive in SIMAP provided some guidance as to the proper approach to the concept of working hours in our present legislation. Quite apart from the different objectives of the different pieces of legislation, I do not agree with that submission. In SIMAP the doctors were on call but at home, a place where, on any view, they did no work at all.

21. For those reasons, therefore, I would dismiss this appeal.

Peter Gibson LJ and Neuberger J agreed.

== See also ==
- UK labour law
