= Animus nocendi =

State of mind of the perpetrator of a crime

In jurisprudence, animus nocendi (from Latin animus 'mind' and noceo 'to harm') is the subjective state of mind of the perpetrator of a crime, with reference to the exact knowledge of illegal content of their behaviour, and of its possible consequences.

In most modern legal systems, the animus nocendi is required as an essential condition to give a penal condemnation.

The animus nocendi is usually demonstrated by the verified presence of these elements:

- knowledge of a law that prohibited the discussed action or conduct (unless there exists a systemic obligation, pending on every citizen, that considers that the law has to be known by every adult — in this case the knowledge is presumed a priori; see also Ignorantia juris non excusat);
- knowledge of the most likely consequences of the perpetrator's action;
- precise intention of breaking the law or of causing the verified effects of the action.

When the author of the crime had no animus nocendi, it is usually considered that the crime still exists, but the author is innocent, unless a responsibility for guilt can be found in the perpetrator's conduct: the typical case of a car accident in which a wrong or even hazardous manoeuvre causes personal injuries to another car driver, is then managed as a crime for the presence of injuries, yet the author will not be prosecuted as the author of the injuries (they did not want to hurt the other driver, thus had no animus nocendi), but simply as the author of a dangerous conduct that indirectly caused said effects, and would be held responsible at a guilt title.

The animus nocendi is often absent in people with mental illness, and in front of such people, a psychiatric expertise is usually required to verify the eventual animus. Minors too are in many systems considered little capable of a correct knowledge about the meaning or the consequences of their actions, and this is the reason for the common reduction of the passive capability of punishment they usually can receive.

A particular case of animus nocendi is the voluntas necandi (from Latin voluntas 'will' and neco 'to kill'), describing the animus nocendi of a person who willfully kills another human being. Establishment of voluntas necandi is necessary to prove murder or voluntary manslaughter as opposed to involuntary manslaughter.

== See also ==
- Mens rea
