= Nicholas Hamblen, Lord Hamblen of Kersey =

British judge (born 1957)

The Right Honourable Lord Hamblen of Kersey
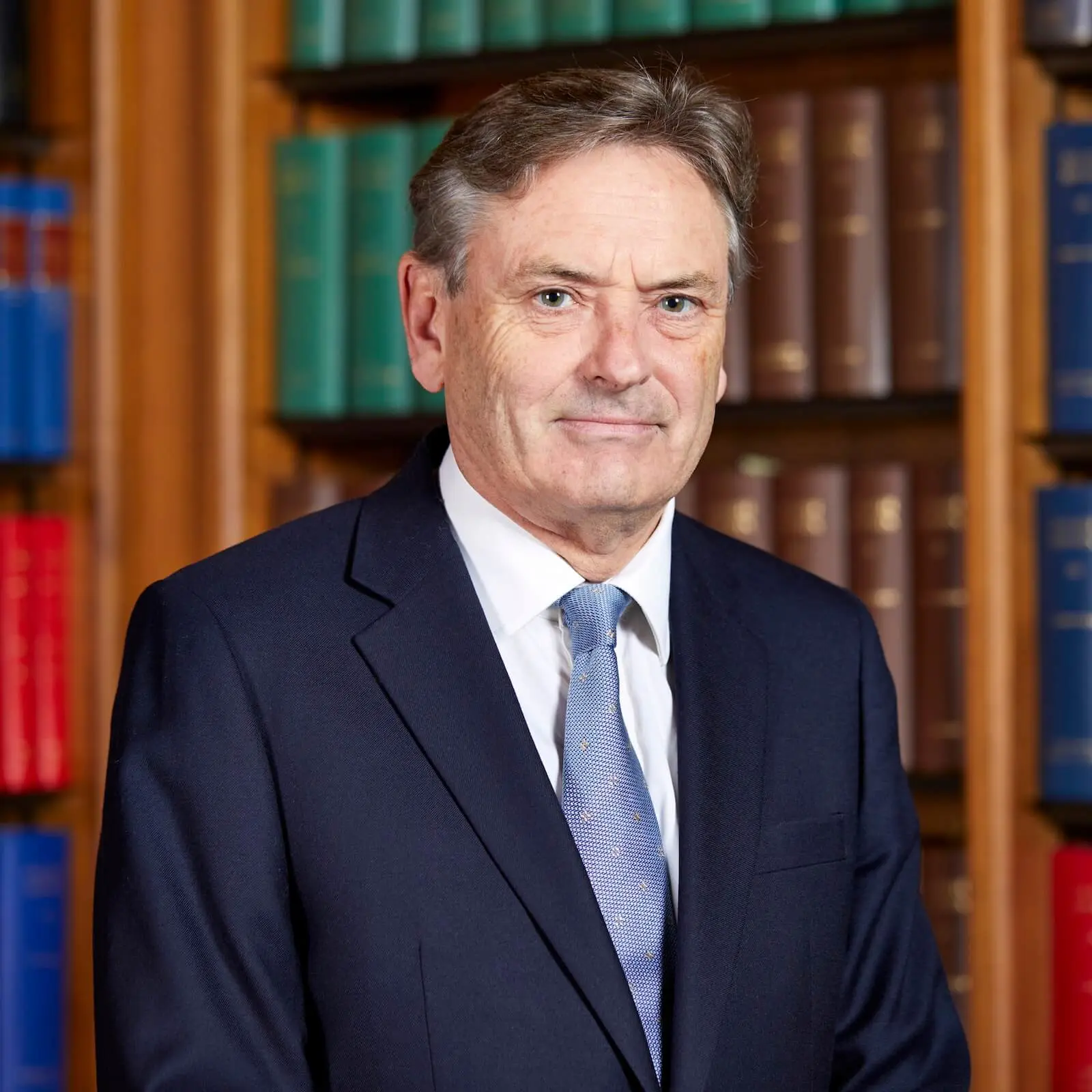

Justice of the Supreme Court of the United Kingdom
- Incumbent
- Assumed office 13 January 2020
- Nominated by: David Gauke
- Appointed by: Elizabeth II
- Preceded by: The Baroness Hale of Richmond

Lord Justice of Appeal
- In office 2016–2020

Justice of the High Court
- In office 2008–2016

Personal details
- Born: 23 September 1957 (age 69)
- Education: St John's College, Oxford; Harvard Law School

Nicholas Archibald Hamblen, Lord Hamblen of Kersey, PC (born 23 September 1957) is a British judge currently serving as a justice of the Supreme Court of the United Kingdom. Prior to his judicial career, Hamblen was a specialist in maritime and commercial law.

== Early life and education ==
Hamblen's maternal grandfather was the General William Duthie Morgan. He was educated at Westminster School and graduated from St John's College, Oxford in 1979, being the top first in law. He later became an Eldon scholar and he sits on the scholarship committee. He was awarded a Kennedy Scholarship to attend Harvard Law School and graduated with an LLM.

== Career ==
He was called to the bar in 1981 and took silk in 1997. As a Queen's Counsel, his principal areas of practice were shipping, insurance and reinsurance, international sale of goods, commodities, conflicts of laws and arbitration. He has appeared in the Court of Appeal, the House of Lords and before various arbitration tribunals. He has also acted as an arbitrator in maritime, insurance and international commercial matters; as well as in ICC, LCIA, LAS, LMAA and general commercial disputes. While at the bar, he was a member of 20 Essex Street.

He became an Assistant Recorder in 1999 and a Recorder in 2000. He was appointed to sit as a Justice in the High Court in 2008.

On 24 July 2015, it was announced that he would be appointed a Lord Justice of Appeal to fill one of the vacancies due to arise in the coming autumn. He was officially appointed a Lord Justice of Appeal in February 2016.

On 8 November 2018, at the annual Donald O'May maritime law lecture held at The Law Society in London's Chancery Lane, Hamblen gave an address on the issue of "Indemnity in time charterparties".

Hamblen was appointed as a Justice of the Supreme Court of the United Kingdom with effect from 13 January 2020, taking the judicial courtesy title of Lord Hamblen of Kersey.

== Arms ==
Coat of arms of Nicholas Hamblen, Lord Hamblen of Kersey
Crest Within a circle of estoiles Azure a demi lion Or grasping between the paws a branch of oak Azure leaves Or. Escutcheon Azure on a bend cotised Argent between two estoiles Or five water bougets bendwise alternate to the sinster and dexter Azure. Motto Sapiens Judicio Constans Consilio
