= DPP v Ziegler =

2021 Supreme Court of the United Kingdom case

- Court: Supreme Court of the United Kingdom
- Full case name: Director of Public Prosecutions v Ziegler and others
- Decided: 25 June 2021
- Citations: [2021] UKSC 23; [2021] 3 WLR 179
- Transcript: Judgment at BAILII

Case history
- Appealed from: [2019] EWHC 71

Director of Public Prosecutions v Ziegler and others [2021] UKSC 23 is a judgment of the Supreme Court of the United Kingdom.

== Facts ==
In 2017, the Defence and Security Equipment International was held at ExCeL London. Four protestors opposed the arms trade and staged a protest to disrupt the fair and deliveries to the fair. The protest involved the appellants lying down in the middle of the road that approached the ExCeL Centre and locking themselves to lock boxes. The police at the scene attempted to persuade the appellants to remove themselves from the road, using a "five stage process". When that failed, the police arrested the appellants, it then took 90 minutes to remove the lock boxes.

The appellants were charged with wilful obstruction of a highway without lawful authority or excuse, contrary to section 137(1) of the Highways Act 1980 (1980 Act), and were acquitted at trial. The district judge at trial took into consideration the appellants' Article 10 and 11 rights under the ECHR and the proportionality of the police's interference with those rights, and found that the prosecution had failed to prove that the obstruction of the highway was unreasonable. The appellants could therefore rely on the defence of lawful excuse. The respondent appealed by way of case stated—a type of appeal that deals with a question of law, not fact.

=== Appeals ===
The High Court—in its appellate function—allowed the appeal and directed that convictions be entered against the appellants. The High Court held that the trial court's assessment of the proportionality of interfering with the appellant's ECHR rights was wrong because the district judge failed to "strike a fair balance" between the interests of the appellants and the public. The High Court refused the appellants' application for permission to appeal but certified two points of law "of general public importance".

The Supreme Court itself granted permission to appeal, and the parties agreed that the issues in the appeal, as certified by the High Court as points of general public importance, were:

- What was the test to be applied by an appellate court to an assessment of the trial court in respect of a statutory defence of lawful excuse when ECHR rights are engaged in a criminal matter?
- Is deliberate physically obstructive conduct capable of constituting a lawful excuse for the purposes of section 137 of the 1980 Act, where the impact of the deliberate obstruction on other highway users is more than de minimis, and prevents, or is capable of preventing them, from passing along the highway?

== Judgment ==
The Supreme Court allowed the appeal and directed the convictions of the appellants be set aside.

=== The appellate test ===
In answering the first certified question, the Supreme Court held that section 137(1) of the 1980 Act must be read so as to comply with the ECHR. This means that the trial court had to consider whether the police's interference with the appellants' Article 10 and 11 rights by arresting them was proportionate. If found to be disproportionate, the appellant would have a defence of lawful excuse to the underlying criminal offence.

The Supreme Court held that the appellate test for the High Court to apply in appeals by way of case stated, including in this case, was whether the court's conclusion was "one which was reasonably open to it", meaning it was not "Wednesbury irrational or perverse". In this approach, a conclusion of fact would be open to challenge only if it is one that no reasonable court could have reached on the facts, or if there was an error of law that was material to the decision. In accordance with that test, where the statutory defence depends on an assessment of proportionality, the Supreme Court held that "an appeal will lie if there is an error or flaw in the reasoning on the face of the case which undermines the cogency of the conclusion on proportionality".

The Supreme Court held that the appellate test to apply in appeals such as this was whether the decision of the trial court was one that no reasonable court would have made or whether there was an error of law material to the decision. Further, where proportionality was concerned, if there were an error in the trial court's reasoning that undermined the cogency of the conclusion on proportionality, an appeal would be allowed.

=== Deliberately obstructive conduct, lawful excuse, and section 137 ===
In answering the second certified question, the Supreme Court reviewed European case law that showed that intentional disruption and obstructive action by protestors benefits from the protections of Article 10 and 11. However, the extent of the disruption and whether it is intentional are factors to consider in assessing proportionality. The Supreme Court set out other factors that were relevant for the trial court to consider when evaluating proportionality, including whether the action was intended to be peaceful, whether it involved the commission of an offence other than the section 137 offence, whether it was carefully targeted at vehicles heading to the ExCeL Centre, and whether it was of limited duration.

As a result, the Supreme Court concluded that the trial court was right to consider those factors when assessing the proportionality of the interference with the appellant's ECHR rights and in finding the interference to be disproportionate. Further, the trial court made no error or flaw in its reasoning such as would undermine the cogency of its conclusion on proportionality in favour of the appellants.

== Significance ==
Following the ruling in Ziegler, several cases were discontinued by the prosecution or given uncontested appeals.

== See also ==
- UK constitutional law
