= Stefanko v Doherty and Maritime Hotel Ltd =

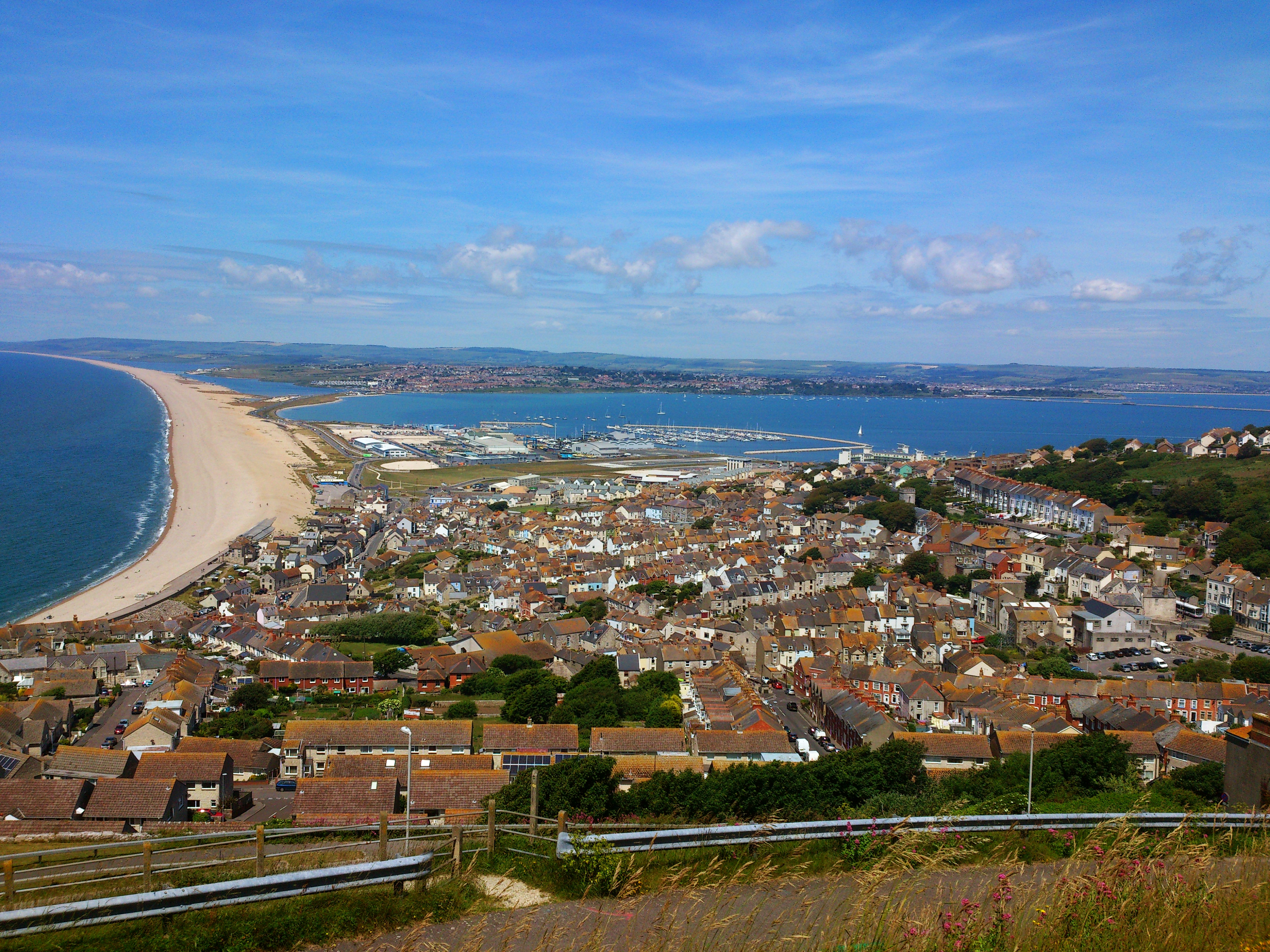
- Weymouth
- Court: Employment Appeal Tribunal
- Citation: [2019] IRLR 322 (EAT)

Keywords
- Discrimination, burden of proof, wages, holiday pay, contracts

Stefanko v Doherty and Maritime Hotel Ltd [2019] IRLR 322 (EAT) is a UK labour law case concerning unfair dismissal and discrimination.

== Facts ==
Stefanko and two other colleagues, Woronowicz and Jonik who were originally from Poland claimed that they were unfairly dismissed, had not been paid wages, not been paid holiday pay, not been given written statements of their employment contracts, and suffered race discrimination from their employers at the Maritime Hotel in Weymouth. Two weeks after the Brexit poll, Woronowicz asked for her wages to be paid correctly and a manager, Mr Nicholas Doherty, told her “Fuck off from my hotel and take your Polish friends with you”. When Jonik and Stefanko subsequently approached Doherty, he mimicked a Polish accent. The claimants then were forced to pack their bags and leave the following morning. The employers argued that there was no dismissal, that it was not unfair, that they had paid wages fully, and that there was no race discrimination. The Employment Tribunal held that there was unfair dismissal, unlawful wage deductions, and failure to pay holiday pay, but not enough evidence of race discrimination.

== Judgment ==
The Employment Appeal Tribunal, with Stacey J giving judgment, held that there was sufficient evidence of race discrimination, and that the burden of proof was on the employer to show otherwise. Stacey J said the following:

6. The Respondents were not present today. The First Respondent is now in creditors' voluntary liquidation as of 19 February 2018 and the liquidator indicated he would not be taking part any further. There was no explanation from the Second Respondent as to why he is not here today, in his written answer to the appeal he seeks to uphold the Tribunal's decision and explains that he is not a racist by any means having employed many ethnic minorities over the years. He has paid the monies ordered by the Tribunal and the appeal is a set up to destroy him and his business. He resists the appeal. I am especially grateful to Dr McGaughey who has provided his services to the Claimants pro bono under the Free Representation Unit scheme.

The Employment Tribunal Judgment

7. The Claimants are of Polish national origin and were employed as waiting staff by the First Respondent, commencing on various dates from 21 April 2016 until their summary dismissal on 7 July 2016, at the First Respondent's hotel in Portland, Dorset. The Second Respondent, who stayed at the hotel was a hands-on manager and co-owner as Shareholder and Director of the First Respondent.

8. The Claimants were provided with accommodation at the hotel. None of them were given a section 1 statement of terms and conditions at any time during the course of their employment or thereafter.

9. It is evident from the Tribunal's Decision that the Claimants were not well treated by their employer and were frequently sworn at by the Second Respondent. When they objected to persistent shortfalls in their wages, late payment and a falsification of their wage slips, they were summarily dismissed on 7 July 2016 (two weeks after the Brexit referendum), told to pack their bags and leave the hotel immediately. They did as they were requested but with nowhere else to go, got into their vehicle and drove to Dover and onwards to Poland.

...

31. In considering an appeal of this nature, it is important to be clear of the distinction between an error of law and facts found by a Tribunal that it has been entitled to reach. Only the former is susceptible to interference by this Appeal Tribunal. It is easy to allege a misapplication of the burden of proof when the real criticism is merely a dislike of the Tribunal's legitimate findings. Where neither of the Respondents has participated much in the appeal it is also worth considering what points could have been made on their behalf.

...

33. I agree with Dr McGaughey's submission that when, as here, there are specific findings that comments have been made which appear on their face to be related to race and amount to less favourable treatment such as mimicking one Claimant's Polish accent and telling another to "Fuck off back to Poland" the Tribunal needed to have explained its reasoning as to how it applied the burden of proof and reached the conclusion that the dismissal had nothing whatsoever to do with race discrimination.

34. The difficulty is compounded by the Tribunal not having referred at all to the burden of proof provisions in its Decision or answered the questions it posed itself in paragraph 3 of its Judgment. Another troubling aspect is that the Claimants' evidence included many other allegations of the use of racial epithets by the Respondents and other race-tainted behaviour which have not been addressed by the Tribunal which did not make relevant findings one way or another on the specific allegations. It is therefore difficult to see how the Tribunal could conclude, as it did in paragraph 24, that "We have to say that we have received no evidence to suggest that the hypothetical comparator in similar circumstances … would have been treated [differently]". They had heard evidence, but it is unsure what they made of it.

35. Hale LJ's (as she then was) observations on the "Porcelli principle" and the useful rule of thumb that the more specific the insult and the injury by reference to a protected characteristic, the more persuasive must be the proof that the behaviour was completely unrelated to a protected characteristic in Pearce v Governing Body of Mayfield Secondary School [2001] EWCA Civ 1347 are apt in this regard. Especially since some of the comments or incidents appear overtly racial.

36. It could perhaps be argued on the Respondents' behalf that the finding at paragraph 21 that the only reason for the Claimants' dismissal is the whistleblowing effectively answers the Claimants' concerns since it makes an explicit finding of a non-racial and exclusive reason for the dismissal that in effect deals comprehensively with the race discrimination allegation. With some hesitation however, I would not have accepted the argument had the Respondents been here to make it. It is certainly a possibility, but without further explanation by the Tribunal it is not sufficient. It is also apparent from the claim form that the Claimants allege discrimination in both the fact of and manner of their dismissal, and the particularly brutal manner of dismissal has not been considered sufficiently by the Tribunal.

37. Overall, I therefore consider that there has been enough shown to me today by Dr McGaughey to say that the Tribunal has erred by failing to consider the burden of proof, failing to reach findings on material evidence and/or failed sufficiently to explain its reasons for its Judgment in order to be Meek-compliant. (Note: In the case of Meek v. City of Birmingham Council (1987), the "overriding rule" was stated, namely that the Tribunal must state the reasons for its decision, so that the parties know why they have won or lost.)

== See also ==
- UK labour law
