= Richard Buxton (judge) =

British judge

The Right Honourable Sir Richard Buxton

Lord Justice of Appeal
- In office 1997–2008

Justice of the High Court
- In office 1994–1997

Personal details
- Born: Richard Joseph Buxton

Sir Richard Joseph Buxton, PC (born 13 July 1938), is a British judge and former Lord Justice of Appeal.

Buxton studied law (BCL, MA) at Exeter College, Oxford, and was called to the Bar at the Inner Temple in 1969. He served as Senior Law Fellow at Exeter College until resigning his fellowship in 1972 to practise at the Bar, and continued to teach in Oxford for a period as a “week-ender”.

He took silk in 1983, and from 1989 to 1993 served as a Commissioner of the Law Commission.

He was appointed to the High Court of Justice on 11 January 1994, serving in the Queen's Bench Division, and was subsequently appointed to the Court of Appeal of England and Wales on 1 October 1997. He retired on 30 September 2008.

From 19 May 1991 to 4 November 1996 he was a director of the Blenheim Court Residents Company (Woodstock), and from 20 September 1993 to 7 July 2008 he served as a director of the Incorporated Council of Law Reporting for England and Wales.

He is an honorary member of the Society of Legal Scholars and an honorary fellow of Exeter College, Oxford.

== Legal cases ==
In April 2011 he ruled on a dispute between the Catholic Church and the parents of Cardinal Vaughan Memorial School. He criticised both parties for failing to resolve the issues between themselves and for bringing a case that was a drain on public resources. In December 2011 he refused an application for appeal from the Daily Telegraph over a libel case involving Sarah Thornton.
