= Chandos Construction Ltd v Deloitte Restructuring Inc =

- Supreme Court of Canada

Hearing: 20 January 2020 Judgment: 2 October 2020
- Full case name: Chandos Construction Ltd v Deloitte Restructuring Inc in its capacity as Trustee in Bankruptcy of Capital Steel Inc, a bankrupt
- Citations: 2020 SCC 25
- Docket No.: 38571
- Prior history: APPEAL from Capital Steel Inc v Chandos Construction Ltd, 2019 ABCA 32 (29 January 2019), setting aside a decision of Nielsen J, Alta. Q.B., Edmonton, No. 24‑2169632, 17 March 2017. Leave to appeal granted, Chandos Construction Ltd v Deloitte Restructuring Inc in its capacity as Trustee in Bankruptcy of Capital Steel Inc, a bankrupt, 2019 CanLII 62565 (11 July 2019), Supreme Court (Canada)
- Ruling: Appeal dismissed, Côté J dissenting

Holding
- Any contract clause by which value is removed from the reach of the insolvent person’s creditors which would otherwise have been available to them, and places that value in the hands of others, is void by virtue of the anti-deprivation rule. This rule has existed in Canadian common law since before federal bankruptcy legislation existed, and has not been eliminated by any decision of the Court or by Parliament.

Court membership
- Chief Justice: Richard Wagner; Puisne Justices: Rosalie Abella, Michael Moldaver, Andromache Karakatsanis, Suzanne Côté, Russell Brown, Malcolm Rowe, Sheilah Martin, Nicholas Kasirer

Reasons given
- Majority: Rowe J, joined by Wagner CJ and Abella, Moldaver, Karakatsanis, Brown, Martin and Kasirer JJ
- Dissent: Côté J

Laws applied
- Bankruptcy and Insolvency Act

Chandos Construction Ltd v Deloitte Restructuring Inc, 2020 SCC 25 is a landmark case of the Supreme Court of Canada concerning the position of the anti-deprivation rule within Canadian insolvency law. It held that, because of differences in Canadian law, the rule has wider application relative to the English rule applied by the UK Supreme Court in Belmont Park Investments Pty Ltd v BNY Corporate Trustee Services Ltd.

== Background ==
Chandos, hired as the general contractor for a condominium project in St. Albert, Alberta, subcontracted Capital Steel to supply steel-related work for it. Before making an assignment in bankruptcy in September 2016, Capital had completed the majority of its work, and Chandos owed it an outstanding balance of $149,618. Chandos had to incur $22,800 of costs on its own account to complete the work, which it was entitled to deduct. The contract also contained another clause, which stated (in relevant part):

In the event the Subcontractor commits any act of insolvency, bankruptcy, winding up or other distribution of assets, or permits a receiver of the Subcontractor's business to be appointed, or ceases to carry on business or closes down its operations, then in any such events:

...

(d) the Subcontractor shall forfeit 10 [percent] of the within Subcontract Agreement price to the Contractor as a fee for the inconvenience of completing the work using alternate means and/or for monitoring the work during the warranty period.

— Clause VII Q

The amount to be forfeited amounted to $137,330, and Chandos argued that it was entitled to offset this against its amount owing, thus resulting in a net $10,512 claim provable in the bankruptcy proceedings. In March 2017, Deloitte, (as the trustee in bankruptcy), applied to the Alberta Court of Queen's Bench, seeking advice and directions on whether Chandos was entitled to rely on that clause.

== The courts below ==
[N]o person possessed of property can reserve that property to himself until he shall become bankrupt, and then provide that, in the event of his becoming bankrupt, it shall pass to another and not to his creditors.

—ABCA, par. 21, citing Whitmore v Mason (1861) 2 J & H 204, 70 ER 1031 at 1034 (18 November 1861)

Nielsen J, acting as chambers judge, found that the clause was a genuine pre-estimate of damages, which imposed liquidated damages and not a penalty. It was therefore not in conflict with the anti-deprivation rule, and Chandos could enforce clause VII Q(d) against Deloitte.

On appeal to the Alberta Court of Appeal, Rowbotham JA, in a 2-1 decision, held that the chambers judge had erred in using the purpose-based approach adopted by the UK Supreme Court in Belmont Park, because the Canadian authorities have generally supported an effects-based approach instead.

Wakeling JA, in a lengthy dissent, asserted that "[t]he fraud-on-the-bankruptcy-law principle (Note: the previous name for the anti-deprivation rule) is not now and likely never has been part of the common law of Canada." In voicing his support for the decision of the chambers judge, he stated:

[124] A corporate bankruptcy ipso facto term is enforceable if its most important feature is the advancement of a reasonable and defensible commercial purpose and its enforcement provides a benefit for the nonbankrupt party that is not significantly greater than is necessary to promote the nonbankrupt party’s legitimate commercial interests.

[125] Section VII Q(d) meets this new common law standard.

Chandos appealed to the Supreme Court of Canada.

== At the Supreme Court of Canada ==
In an 8–1 decision, the appeal was dismissed with costs throughout.

=== Majority ruling ===
The anti-deprivation rule renders void contractual provisions that would prevent property from passing to the trustee and thus frustrate s. 71 and the scheme of the BIA. This maximizes the assets that are available for the trustee to pass to creditors.

—SCC, par. 30

In his judgment, Rowe J held that:

1. If the clause is invalid because of the anti-deprivation rule, it does not matter whether it is or is not because of the penalty rule.
2. The anti-deprivation rule has existed in Canadian common law (Note: appearing in Canadian jurisprudence since at least Watson v Mason, 22 Gr 574 (U.C. Ch. 1876). (before the Parliament of Canada adopted a bankruptcy statute), and Hobbs v Ontario Loan and Debenture Co, 1890 CanLII 10, 18 SCR 483 (when the bankruptcy statute had been repealed)) and has not been eliminated by either this Court or Parliament. Rowbotham JA did not err in considering this issue.
3. That rule operates in light of s. 71 of the Bankruptcy and Insolvency Act, which provides that the property of a bankrupt "passes to and vests in the trustee". "Thus, once a court ascertains that Parliament intended, by virtue of s. 71, that all of the bankrupt’s property is to be collected in the trustee, it is not for the court to substitute a competing goal that would give rise to a different result."
4. It is desirable that the courts should adopt an effects-based approach to the anti-deprivation rule, much as it does for the pari passu rule.
5. There are certain matters that the rule will not capture:

- contract provisions that eliminate property from an estate (but do not eliminate value),
- provisions that are triggered by events other than bankruptcy or insolvency, and
- steps taken where "commercial parties protect themselves against a contracting counterparty’s insolvency by taking security, acquiring insurance, or requiring a third-party guarantee."

With respect to the issue of setoff of debts, Rowe J noted that it only applies to enforceable debts and claims that are not triggered by the bankruptcy. That was not the case here.

=== Côté's dissent ===
While she agreed with Rowe J "that the anti-deprivation rule has a longstanding and strong jurisprudential footing in Canadian law and that it has not been eliminated by this Court or through legislation", Côté J argued that, as in Belmont Park, it should not apply where contractual provisions have a bona fide commercial purpose. There have only been several instances of obiter comments in Supreme Court jurisprudence in that respect, but she argued that there were many instances of that occurring in the lower courts. She also asserted that s. 71 of the BIA is not as clear as Rowe J stated, and thus there is a principled basis for adopting a purpose-based approach such as seen in Belmont Park and British Eagle. As the clause in question in this case had a bona fide purpose, it should be upheld.

== Impact and aftermath ==
Unlike the situation in the United States, where its Bankruptcy Code generally voids ipso facto clauses, (Note: 11 U.S.C. § 365(b)(2), subject to certain specified exceptions under 11 U.S.C. §§ 555–561) Canada has done so only where bankruptcy proposals and notices of intention to do so, consumer proposals and individual bankruptcies have been filed under the Bankruptcy and Insolvency Act, or where proceedings have begun under the Companies' Creditors Arrangement Act. The anti-deprivation rule is therefore relevant only with respect to corporate bankruptcies and receiverships.

Canadian legal commentators have pointed out several consequences of the SCC's decision:

- While the clawback clause was voided, the clause relating to claims for warranty deficiencies was not, so Chandos still has an arguable case for being able to subtract such costs from what it owes Capital Steel.
- Because the right of setoff was noted as being not necessarily incompatible with the anti-deprivation rule, as long as the debt is not triggered by the bankruptcy itself, parties to commercial contracts will need to draft relevant trigger clauses with great care to prevent them from being avoided, but it will be more difficult to do so.
- The Court's observation that the rule does not capture clauses that remove items that do not have value leaves open the question as to whether a party’s insolvency alters responsibility for the operatorship of jointly owned property, especially in the oil-and-gas sector.
- The Court did not consider the potential impact on make-whole or prepayment premium clauses that can be found in many commercial loan agreements, which can be triggered on their early termination.
