= Anti-deprivation rule =

Legal principle in common law

The anti-deprivation rule (also known as fraud upon the bankruptcy law) is a principle applied by the courts in common law jurisdictions (other than the United States) (Note: which has its own statutory rules barring ipso facto clauses in the event of bankruptcy) in which, according to Mellish LJ in Re Jeavons, ex parte Mackay, "a person cannot make it a part of his contract that, in the event of bankruptcy, he is then to get some additional advantage which prevents the property being distributed under the bankruptcy laws." Wood VC had earlier observed (Note: relying on Higinbotham v Holme (1812) 19 Ves Jun 88, 34 ER 451 (6 May 1812)) that "the law is too clearly settled to admit of a shadow of doubt that no person possessed of property can reserve that property to himself until he shall become bankrupt, and then provide that, in the event of his becoming bankrupt, it shall pass to another and not to his creditors."

== General scheme ==
It arises from the general principle (known as the "rule against repugnancy" in property law) that a grantor may not derogate from his own grant by giving an absolute interest in an asset and then providing for it to be clawed back otherwise than for fair value in stated eventualities, including (but not limited to) bankruptcy and winding up. This is considered to consist of several branches:

- General principle
  - Anti-deprivation rule
    - "Contracting out" rule
    - "Insolvency-triggered deprivation" rule
  - Pari passu rule

Belmont Park Investments Pty Ltd v BNY Corporate Trustee Services Ltd and Lehman Brothers Special Financing Inc observed that the general principle consists of two subrules — the anti-deprivation rule and the pari passu rule, which are addressed to different mischiefs — and held that, in borderline cases, a commercially sensible transaction entered into in good faith should not be held to infringe the first rule. The relationship between the two rules was expanded upon later by Longmore LJ in Lomas v JFB Firth Rixson Inc:

96. The relationship between the anti-deprivation principle and the pari passu rule is both dependant and autonomous. The former is concerned with contractual arrangements which have the effect of depriving the bankrupt estate of property which would otherwise have formed part of it. The pari passu rule governs the distribution of assets within the estate following the event of bankruptcy. It therefore invalidates arrangements under which a creditor receives more than his proper share of the available assets or where ... debts due to the company on liquidation were to be dealt with other than in accordance with the statutory regime.

In 2012, the Chancery Division, in assessing the football creditors rule, held that it was valid and did not violate either the anti-deprivation rule or the pari passu rule. In his judgment, Richards J, relying on Belmont Park, declared:

- the anti-deprivation rule applies from the commencement of administration
- the pari passu principle comes into play only if the purpose of the insolvency procedure is to effect a distribution
- if a transaction has the effect of depriving a company of an asset in order to distribute it among some only of the creditors otherwise eligible to participate in a distribution, it offends both principles
- if the deprivation occurs on the company going into administration, only the anti-deprivation principle will be engaged

=== Aspects of the rule ===
With respect to the anti-deprivation rule, Patten LJ has observed that "the individual bankrupt or insolvent company may not contract at any time, either before or after the making of the bankruptcy or winding-up order, for its property subsisting at that date to be disposed of or dealt with otherwise than in accordance with the statute." It is argued that this rule can therefore be subdivided into two branches: the "insolvency-triggered deprivation" rule looks to disposals, and the "contracting out" rule to dealings. These subrules target two distinct strategies that a debtor might pursue:

1. it could favour a nominated party on insolvency could either provide for a specific insolvency-triggered deprivation of its assets in favour of that party (being assets that would otherwise be available for distribution on the debtor's insolvency), or
2. it could agree to more attractive contractual set-offs or netting arrangements, thus avoiding the distribution rules that would otherwise apply to the debtor's property.

All these anti-avoidance rules are, however, subject to the very large exception that creditors remain able to jump up the priority queue, through the creation of a security interest.

=== Scope of application ===
Certain types of arrangements are not considered to offend the rule:

- limited and determinable interests and licences
- preemption provisions in articles of association
- provision for termination on winding up of interest annexed to membership status

Other types are normally considered to offend:

- provision for divestment of ownership of an asset on winding up
- vesting clauses in building contracts (which vest the builder's materials in the building's owner upon the builder's liquidation)
- sale with provision for retransfer on winding up (where the seller did not reserve title until payment)
- increase in a company's contractual obligation on winding up

== Contracting out ==
This case arises infrequently, but it did so notably in British Eagle International Air Lines Ltd v Compaigne Nationale Air France. Several principles arise from it:

1. It is irrelevant that the parties did not intend to achieve an insolvency advantage, or that the arrangement is long-standing, or has always represented the relationship between the parties, or is a static arrangement involving no insolvency trigger which changes the arrangement between the parties.
2. It is crucial that the company is in insolvency proceedings, and that it has assets that need to be dealt with under those proceedings. What is then important is the effect of the impugned arrangement on the treatment of the insolvent's assets on its insolvency.
3. If the impugned arrangement does not determine the distribution of the insolvent's assets, but defines the very asset which is the subject of the insolvency proceedings, then the transaction is generally safe.

In Lomas v JFB Firth Rixson Inc it was argued that certain provisions in standard form ISDA Master Agreement might offend against the rule; specifically that if an Event of Default (as defined) suspended the right of the Defaulting Party to receive payment indefinitely, then that would mean that if the Non-Defaulting Party went into liquidation, the operating effect of the provision was to deprive the company's creditors of assets as a consequence of it going into liquidation. However the Court of Appeal considered the principles outlined in Belmont Park Investments Pty Ltd v BNY Corporate Trustee Services Ltd, and held that "If this is the touchstone then it is difficult to see how Section 2(a)(iii) of the Master Agreement can be said to offend against the anti-deprivation principle. ... There is no suggestion that it was formulated in order to avoid the effect of any insolvency law or to give the non-defaulting party a greater or disproportionate return as a creditor of the bankrupt estate."

== Insolvency deprivation ==
This subrule has been described by Cotton LJ as holding that "there cannot be a valid contract that a man's property shall remain his until his bankruptcy, and on the happening of that event shall go over to someone else, and be taken away from his creditors." This is considered to be a true anti-deprivation rule, and several issues arise from it:

1. It is legitimate for courts to intervene on the grounds of public policy, even in areas primarily governed by statute.
2. If the arrangement breaches the insolvency-deprivation rule, then it is void.
3. the party's insolvency must trigger the deprivation. The rule does not catch arrangements which prevent property ever reaching the insolvent's hands (Note: Such as with effective retention of title agreements, Quistclose trusts, or purchase money security interests.) Equally, deprivations caused by some other event – any other event – are not touched by this rule (Note: In particular, deprivations caused by pre-insolvency disposal of assets, or by deprivation or forfeiture clauses that are not triggered by the party’s own insolvency, are all untouched by the insolvency-deprivation rule, as in Newitt (deprivation triggered by default) and Detmold (deprivation triggered by alienation).)
4. The rule only concerns arrangements entered into by the insolvent.
5. It is irrelevant that the asset being deprived was acquired by way of gift rather than for valuable consideration.
6. As in the "contracting out" cases, it is irrelevant that the provision was "always a term of the contract", rather than a post-acquisition initiative that effected a deprivation triggered by insolvency.

The Canadian courts have extended this further, declaring that termination clauses that are triggered where non-payment of obligations is indirectly caused by the debtor's insolvency should be deemed to have been caused by the insolvency.

== Application in other jurisdictions ==
=== Canada ===
In October 2020, the Supreme Court of Canada upheld a decision of the Alberta Court of Appeal which affirmed that the anti-deprivation rule existed as part of the common law in Canada. The SCC departed from the UK Supreme Court's judgment in Belmont Park, in holding that an effects-based test must be used in applying the rule, as that was a logical consequence of the requirement of Canada's Bankruptcy and Insolvency Act that the bankrupt's property must "immediately pass to and vest in the trustee".
