= Lomas v JFB Firth Rixson Inc =

2012 English series of co-joined appeals

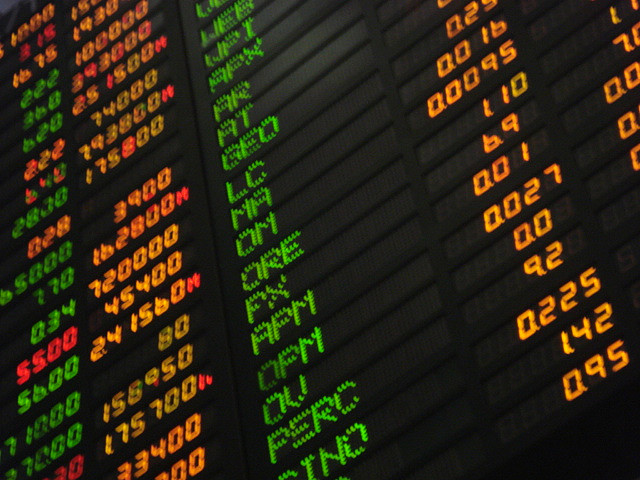
- Court: Court of Appeal
- Full case name: Lomas & Others (as joint administrators of Lehman Brothers International (Europe)) v JFB Firth Rixson Inc & Others
- Decided: 3 April 2012
- Citations: [2012] EWCA Civ 419 [2012] 2 Lloyd's Rep 548 [2012] 2 All ER (Comm) 1076 [2012] 1 CLC 713

Case history
- Appealed from: [2010] EWHC 3372 (Ch) [2011] EWHC 718 (Ch) [2011] EWHC 1692 (Comm) [2011] EWHC 692 (Comm) (co-joined appeals)

Court membership
- Judges sitting: Longmore LJ; Patten LJ; Tomlinson LJ

Case opinions
- Decision by: Longmore LJ

Keywords
- derivatives, netting, anti-deprivation rule

Lomas v JFB Firth Rixson Inc [2012] EWCA Civ 419 (3 April 2012) is the name of a series of co-joined appeals heard by the English Court of Appeal in relation to the efficacy of certain provisions under the standard form ISDA Master Agreement (1992 form). Four appeals were consolidated into a single hearing, and in a comprehensive joint judgment delivered by Lord Justice Longmore the Court attempted to provide definitive resolutions to various issues of interpretation which had given rise to conflicting judgments at first instance. One academic commentator has referred to the case as a "comprehensive judgment [which] masterfully resolved a number of conflicting strands of jurisprudence".

The decision dealt with many of the same issues as the controversial Metavante ruling in the New York courts, although coming to the opposite conclusion under English law.

== Facts ==
The facts varied between the individual appeals, but the common theme in each of them was that an Event of Default (as defined) had occurred under an ISDA Master Agreement, but the Defaulting Party (as defined) was "in the money", in the sense that if the open positions were all to be terminated, the non-Defaulting Party would have had to pay over considerable sums to the Defaulting Party to close out the various positions. However, in each case the relevant Master Agreements had not provided for automatic early termination upon an Event of Default. Accordingly, each non-Defaulting Party could simply elect not to terminate on the basis of the Event of Default and avoid paying the sums otherwise due to the Defaulting Party.

This problem was then compounded by the drafting of the ISDA Master Agreement which stated that non-occurrence of an Event of Default was a "condition precedent" to any payment obligation. In the cases before the court, because the Event of Default was continuing up until the time when the financial contracts would naturally have come due for payment, the non-Defaulting Parties argued that they never had to pay the sums due because the condition precedent was not satisfied; in essence they were entitled to a windfall and could avoid their liabilities under the relevant derivative contracts because of the other party's default.

The need for a comprehensive statement of the law by the Court of Appeal had been driven in part by a decision of Flaux J in Marine Trade SA v Pioneer Freight Futures Co Ltd [2010] Lloyds Rep 631 where the court had taken a position contrary to the orthodox market view in relation to the close-out provisions.

The different appeals had different derivative contracts under consideration, but most of the legal issues which arose were capable of being dealt with on a cojoined basis. The consolidated appeals were:

Summary of co-joined appeals
No.	Litigants	Type of derivative(s)	Automatic Early Termination?
1.	Lomas v JFB Firth Rixson Inc	Multiple interest rate swaps	No AET
2.	Lehman Brothers Special Financing Inc v Carlton Communications Limited	Two linked interest rate swaps	No AET
3.	Pioneer Freight Futures Company Limited (in liquidation) v Cosco Bulk Carrier Company Limited	Eleven forward freight agreements	AET
4.	Bulk Trading SA v Britannia Bulk plc (in liquidation)	Single forward freight agreement	AET

== Judgment ==
In a long and often difficult judgment, the Court of Appeal sought to break the various points into individual issues which it addressed separately.

=== Suspension of payment ===
The Court of Appeal confirmed that because the non-occurrence of an Event of Default was a condition precedent to payment under the Master Agreement, this meant that if an Event of Default was continuing that no party could be under an obligation to make payment even if payment was otherwise due unless the non-Defaulting Party exercised its right to early termination. Effectively, under the contractual terms of the ISDA Master Agreement, the non-Defaulting Party was able to preclude its own liability to pay by relying upon the occurrence of an Event of Default in relation to the other party and simply not exercising the right to terminate. They rejected any argument that there was an implied term on the part of the non-Defaulting Party to terminate within a reasonable period of time or at all after the occurrence of an Event of Default.

=== Extinguishment of underlying right ===
Whilst an Event of Default subsisted any right to payment was effectively suspended. However, it was necessary to distinguish the debt from the obligation to pay; the underlying debt would continue to exist despite the fact that the payment obligation in respect of that debt did not arise under the terms of the Master Agreement.

Accordingly, the Court held, following the decision of the Supreme Court of New South Wales in Enron Australia v TXU Electricity [2003] NSWSC 1169, that the underlying debt remains in existing even though the payment obligation is inoperable. Accordingly, if the provisions preventing the operation of the payment obligation fall away, the "payment obligation will spring up under a pre-existing trade once the relevant condition is satisfied, and in that sense it might be said (with only approximate accuracy) that the payment obligation is 'suspended' while the condition remains unfulfilled."

These issues only arose in the first two appeals because the parties elected not to utilise the automatic early termination (AET) provisions in the Master Agreement. Accordingly, early termination could only by election, and that left the non-Defaulting Parties free to withhold making that election and crystallising their payment obligations. However the underlying analysis would be relevant to issues raised in the second two appeals.

=== Revival of payment right ===
The Court further held that there is no necessary implication that the payment right must inevitably revive at some point, after effluxion of time or otherwise. Arguments to the effect that there should be an implied term in the ISDA Master Agreement to that effect were dismissed. Although it might be administratively inconvenient, the result of the factual situation was that the non-Defaulting Party would remain liable to the Defaulting Party potentially forever, but never be under an obligation to make actual payment with respect to that liability.

=== Maturity of the transaction ===
At first instance it was held that the payment obligation of the non-Defaulting Party was suspended during the currency of the transaction, the suspension ended on maturity whereupon the liability was then extinguished. The court at first instance appeared to feel compelled to so hold, as otherwise the obligation would remain outstanding but not due for payment indefinitely. After considerably analysis of the various issues the Court of Appeal held however that this in fact the result:

We decide therefore that Mr Zacaroli's submissions are correct and that there is no terminus, either by way of extinction or revival, to the condition precedent. It continues in force until the Event of Default is cured. If it is never cured, there continues to be no obligation on the Non-defaulting Party to make payment.

The Court noted that this arguably was an administratively inconvenient result. It meant that one party continued to be indebted to another party, but that other party could never enforce the right to payment. The Court further noted that if the condition precedent was subsequently cured after maturity, then payment could still occur at that time. Ironically, under the defined terms in the agreement that would constitute "early" termination, although the actual termination would occur long after stated maturity.

=== Effect of condition precedent on netting ===
The Court of Appeal also had to consider (in the context of the second appeal) whether the fact that a condition precedent remained unsatisfied would prevent an underlying obligation accruing for the purposes of calculating a net position between the parties. In line with the decisions on the other issues, the Court of Appeal held that the rights may accrue, and may net-out; only the payment obligation is suspended. This followed from the analysis of the earlier points, but the Court was also reinforced in its conclusions by the wording of the netting provisions which used the express words "would otherwise be payable".

=== Anti-deprivation rule ===
In one of the cojoined appeals it was argued that if an Event of Default suspended the right of the Defaulting Party to receive payment indefinitely, then that would be a breach of the anti-deprivation rule. Because in this case the Event of Default was one party going into liquidation, that meant that the operating effect of the provision was to deprive the company's creditors of assets as a consequence of it going into liquidation. The Court referred to the recent decision of the Supreme Court in Belmont Park Investments Pty Ltd v BNY Corporate Trustee Services Ltd [2011] UKSC 38 and held that relevant test was to consider each transaction on its merits to see whether the shift in interests complained of could be justified as a genuine and justifiable commercial response to the consequences of insolvency. The Court of Appeal held that "If this is the touchstone then it is difficult to see how Section 2(a)(iii) of the Master Agreement can be said to offend against the anti-deprivation principle. ... There is no suggestion that it was formulated in order to avoid the effect of any insolvency law or to give the non-defaulting party a greater or disproportionate return as a creditor of the bankrupt estate."

=== Calculation of "Loss" ===
In the fourth appeal the Court of Appeal had to consider a Master Agreement where the parties had selected automatic early termination (AET). They had to therefore consider a separate point raised whereby whether the AET provisions necessarily assumed that all conditions precedent were satisfied (i.e. amongst other things, there was no Event of Default) for the purposes of carrying out the calculation of the amounts payable (defined as "Loss" under the agreement). The Court framed the question thus: "is Bulk as the Non-defaulting Party obliged to calculate its loss by reference to sums which would have become due to Britannia Bulk had Britannia Bulk not remained subject to an Event of Default after Automatic Early Termination?" The Court held not, and upheld the existing line of authority on this point, most notably in the decision of Gloster J in Pioneer Freight Co Ltd v TMT Asia Ltd [2011] 2 Lloyds Rep 96. In line with its decision on the earlier points in the decision, the Court of Appeal held that absence of a condition precedent preventing the payment mechanism working, but it did not otherwise affect the underlying debt accruing and being calculated in accordance with the terms of the agreement.

== Other ==
Although not part of the ratio decidendi of the case, the Court of Appeal made a number of other notable pronouncements in the course of their judgment.

=== Definition of a derivative ===
The Court judicially approved the definition of a derivative adopted by the editors of Firth on Derivatives:

a transaction under which the future obligations of one or more of the parties are linked in some specified way to another asset or index, whether involving the delivery of the asset or the payment of an amount calculated by reference to its value or the value of the index. The transaction is therefore treated as having a value which is separate (although derived) from the values of the underlying asset or index. As a result, the parties’ rights and obligations under the transaction can be treated as if they constituted a separate asset and are typically traded accordingly.

=== Single agreement concept ===
The Court also definitively upheld the "single agreement" concept under the ISDA Master Agreement. Section 1(c) of the Master Agreement provides:

Single Agreement. All Transactions are entered into in reliance on the fact that this Master Agreement and all Confirmations form a single agreement between the parties (collectively referred to as this "Agreement"), and the parties would not otherwise enter into any Transactions.

The Court confirmed that the effect of Section 1(c) is that the parties are agreeing that the obligations contained in "all Transactions ... entered into" are not to be treated as separate and distinct, but rather are made subject to the overarching contractual framework constituted by the Master Agreement. The Court rejected the approach adopted by Flaux J at first instance (whereby all Transactions are not treated in the same way but are treated differently).

== See also ==
- Court of Appeal rules on key provisions of the ISDA Master Agreement
- Section 2(a)(iii) ISDA Master Agreement: Court of Appeal judgment on four appeals
- The ISDA Master Agreement: from here to eternity

== Notes ==
The International Swaps and Derivatives Association (ISDA) appeared as an intervener to argue in favour of a more benign interpretation of the provisions of the Master Agreement, but were largely unsuccessful.

Permission to appeal to the Supreme Court was refused.
