= 2020 reasons of the Supreme Court of Canada =

The table below lists the decisions (known as reasons) delivered from the bench by the Supreme Court of Canada during 2020. The table illustrates what reasons were filed by each justice in each case, and which justices joined each reason.

== Reasons ==
Delivered the Court's reason
Joined the Court's reason
Filed a concurrence
Joined a concurrence
Filed a dissent
Joined a dissent
Filed a concurrence/dissent
Joined a concurrence/dissent
Did not participate in the judgment
Did not participate in the final disposition of the judgment
Not a member of the Court at the time of hearing or delivering
- Decisions that do not note a Justice delivering the Court's reason are per coram.
- Multiple concurrences and dissents within a case are numbered, with joining votes numbered accordingly. Justices occasionally join multiple reasons in a single case; each vote is subdivided accordingly.
- Multiple unnumbered reasons are jointly written or delivered.
- Decisions that are given orally from the bench are denoted by a "V"; per coram decisions delivered orally from the bench only note a "V" on the most senior justice on the panel.
- An asterisk ( * ) in the Court's opinion denotes that it was only a majority in part or a plurality.

| Case name | Argued | Decided | Wagner | Abella | Moldaver | Karakatsanis | Gascon | Côté | Brown | Rowe | Martin | Kasirer |
| Reference re Environmental Management Act, 2020 SCC 1 | January 16, 2020 | January 16, 2020 | V |
| 9354-9186 Québec inc. v. Callidus Capital Corp., 2020 SCC 10 | January 23, 2020 | January 23, 2020 |
| R v Doonanco, 2020 SCC 2 | February 18, 2020 | February 18, 2020 | | | V |
| R v S.H., 2020 SCC 3 | February 19, 2020 | February 19, 2020 | | | V | | | | V |
| Newfoundland and Labrador (Attorney General) v Uashaunnuat (Innu of Uashat and of Mani-Utenam), 2020 SCC 4 | April 24, 2019 | February 21, 2020 |
| Nevsun Resources Ltd v Araya, 2020 SCC 5 | January 23, 2019 | February 28, 2020 |
| MacDonald v. Canada, 2020 SCC 6 | October 17, 2019 | March 13, 2020 |
| R v K.G.K., 2020 SCC 7 | September 25, 2019 | March 20, 2020 |
| R v Chung, 2020 SCC 8 | January 17, 2020 | March 27, 2020 |
| R v Friesen, 2020 SCC 9 | October 16, 2019 | April 2, 2020 |
| Case name | Argued | Decided | Wagner | Abella | Moldaver | Karakatsanis | Gascon | Côté | Brown | Rowe | Martin | Kasirer |
| R v Ahmad, 2020 SCC 11 | October 11, 2019 | May 29, 2020 |
| R v Li, 2020 SCC 12 | June 11, 2020 | June 11, 2020 | | | | | | | | | V |
| Conseil scolaire francophone de la Colombie-Britannique v. British Columbia, 2020 SCC 13 | September 26, 2019 | June 12, 2020 |
| R v Zora, 2020 SCC 14 | December 4, 2019 | June 18, 2020 |
| Uber Technologies Inc v Heller, 2020 SCC 16 | November 6, 2019 | June 26, 2020 |
| Reference re Genetic Non‑Discrimination Act, SCC 2020 17 | October 10, 2019 | July 10, 2020 | | | | * |
| R v Thanabalasingham, 2020 SCC 18 | June 10, 2020 | July 17, 2020 |
| Atlantic Lottery Corporation Inc. v Babstock, 2020 SCC 19 | December 3, 2019 | July 24, 2020 |
| British Columbia (Attorney General) v Provincial Court Judges' Association of British Columbia, 2020 SCC 20 | December 9, 2019 | July 31, 2020 |
| Nova Scotia (Attorney General) v Judges of the Provincial Court and Family Court of Nova Scotia, 2020 SCC 21 | December 9, 2019 | July 31, 2020 |
| Case name | Argued | Decided | Wagner | Abella | Moldaver | Karakatsanis | Gascon | Côté | Brown | Rowe | Martin | Kasirer |
| 1704604 Ontario Ltd. v Pointes Protection Association, 2020 SCC 22 | November 12, 2019 | September 10, 2020 |
| Bent v Platnick, 2020 SCC 23 | November 12, 2019 | September 10, 2020 |
| Chandos Construction Ltd v Deloitte Restructuring Inc, 2020 SCC 25 | January 20, 2020 | October 2, 2020 |
| R v Esseghaier, 2021 SCC 9 | October 7, 2020 | October 7, 2020 |
| R v Chouhan, 2021 SCC 26 | October 7, 2020 | October 7, 2020 | | | * | 1 | | | * | 2 | 1 | 1 |
| Matthews v Ocean Nutrition Canada Ltd., 2020 SCC 26 | October 8, 2019 | October 9, 2020 |
| R v Reilly, 2020 SCC 27 | October 13, 2020 | October 13, 2020 | | | | | | | V |
| Fraser v Canada (Attorney General), 2020 SCC 28 | December 12, 2019 | October 16, 2020 | | | | | | 1 | 2 | 2 |
| Owners, Strata Plan LMS 3905 v. Crystal Square Parking Corp., 2020 SCC 29 | June 9, 2020 | October 23, 2020 |
| Desjardins Financial Services Firm Inc. v Asselin, 2020 SCC 30 | December 5, 2019 | October 30, 2020 |
| Case name | Argued | Decided | Wagner | Abella | Moldaver | Karakatsanis | Gascon | Côté | Brown | Rowe | Martin | Kasirer |
| R v Riley, 2020 SCC 31 | November 3, 2020 | November 3, 2020 | | | | V |
| Quebec (Attorney General) v 9147-0732 Québec inc., 2020 SCC 32 | January 22, 2020 | November 5, 2020 | | 1 | | 1 | | | | | 1 | 2 |
| R v Langan, 2020 SCC 33 | November 5, 2020 | November 5, 2020 | | V |
| R v Kishayinew, 2020 SCC 34 | November 5, 2020 | November 5, 2020 | | | V |
| 1688782 Ontario Inc. v Maple Leaf Foods Inc., 2020 SCC 35 | October 15, 2019 | November 6, 2020 |
| R v Slatter, 2020 SCC 36 | November 6, 2020 | November 6, 2020 | | | V |
| Hydro-Québec v. Matta, 2020 SCC 37 | December 10, 2019 | November 13, 2020 |
| Ontario (Attorney General) v G, 2020 SCC 38 | February 20, 2020 | November 20, 2020 |
| R v Delmas, 2020 SCC 39 | December 2, 2020 | December 2, 2020 | | | V |
| R v Mehari, 2020 SCC 40 | December 4, 2020 | December 4, 2020 | | | | | | | | | V |
| Case name | Argued | Decided | Wagner | Abella | Moldaver | Karakatsanis | Gascon | Côté | Brown | Rowe | Martin | Kasirer |
| Co-Operators General Insurance Co. v. Sollio Groupe Coopératif, 2020 SCC 41 | December 7, 2020 | December 7, 2020 | | | | | | | | | | V |
| R v W.M., 2020 SCC 42 | December 10, 2020 | December 10, 2020 | V |
| Resolute FP Canada Inc. v Hydro‑Québec, 2020 SCC 43 | January 21, 2020 | December 11, 2020 |
| R v Cortes Rivera, 2020 SCC 44 | December 11, 2020 | December 11, 2020 | | V |
| C.M. Callow Inc. v. Zollinger, 2020 SCC 45 | December 6, 2019 | December 18, 2020 |
| Case name | Argued | Decided | Wagner | Abella | Moldaver | Karakatsanis | Gascon | Côté | Brown | Rowe | Martin | Kasirer |
