= William Milbourne James (judge) =

Welsh judge and Lord Justice of Appeal (1807–1881)

The Right Honourable Sir William Milbourne James
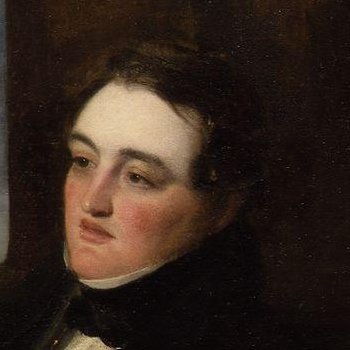
- James as a young man

Vice-Chancellor
- In office 2 January 1869 – 2 July 1870
- Preceded by: Sir George Markham Giffard
- Succeeded by: Sir James Bacon

Lord Justice of Appeal, Court of Appeal in Chancery
- In office 2 July 1870 – 7 June 1881
- Preceded by: Sir Charles Jasper Selwyn

Judicial Committee of the Privy Council
- In office 2 July 1870 – 7 June 1881

Personal details
- Born: 29 June 1807 Merthyr Tydfil, Wales
- Died: 7 June 1881 (aged 73) 47 Wimpole Street, London, England
- Resting place: Highgate Cemetery
- Children: 1 son and 1 daughter
- Relatives: Admiral Sir William Milbourne James (grandson); Charles Herbert James, MP (cousin); William Otter, Bishop of Chichester (father-in-law); Major-General George Salis-Schwabe (son-in-law)
- Education: Glasgow University; Lincoln's Inn
- Occupation: Judge
- Profession: Lawyer

Sir William Milbourne James, PC (29 June 1807 – 7 June 1881) was a Welsh barrister and judge. A Chancery specialist, he was appointed to the Court of Chancery of England in 1869. The next year, he was appointed Lord Justice of Appeal in Chancery (Lord Justice of Appeal from 1877), as well as a member of the Privy Council, serving until his death in 1881.

== Early life and family ==
James was born in Merthyr Tydfil, Wales, in 1807 to Christopher James, a prosperous provision merchant, and his wife, Ann. He was baptised Presbyterian. His cousin was Charles Herbert James, who later became Member of Parliament for Merthyr Tydfil. He was educated privately at the school run by John James of Gellionnen before entering Glasgow University.

In 1836 James was included in the preparations for the record breaking balloon trip funded by Robert Hollond. He was amongst six people included in the commemorative painting which is now in the National Portrait Gallery in London.

In 1846 James married Maria Otter, daughter of William Otter, Bishop of Chichester. The couple had two children, a son and a daughter. Their son, W. C. James, became an officer in the 16th Lancers, and was the father of Admiral Sir William Milbourne James. Their daughter, Mary Jaqueline James, married George Salis-Schwabe, also of the 16th Lancers.

== Career at the bar ==
James was called to the Bar from Lincoln's Inn in 1831. James first practised his legal work around the South Wales circuit, but later switched his activities to his Chancery practice.

During his legal career, he held several government legal positions: Junior Counsel to HM Treasury in Equity, Junior Counsel to the Woods and Forests Department, the Inland Revenue, and the Metropolitan Board of Works. In 1853 he was appointed Queen's Counsel, and Vice-Chancellor of the County Palatine of Lancaster.

James also was appointed to several commissions of inquiry into various subjects, including equity procedure, the Law Commission of India, and the army purchase commission. As a member of the judicature commission, he argued strongly for major reforms, including the abolition of pleadings.

In 1866, he was the Treasurer of Lincoln's Inn.

== Political activity ==
James stood for election twice in the constituency of Derby, as a Liberal. He was also a member of the Reform Club. In 1880, he was considered for the nomination to the Merthyr Tydfil seat when his cousin was elected, but by that time James had lost touch with Welsh affairs and had little interest in the Welsh national movement.

== Judicial career ==
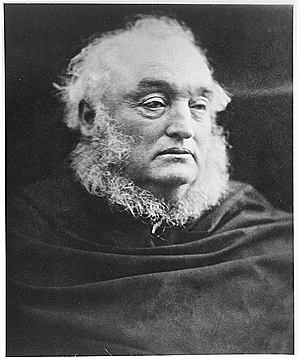
Lord Justice James, photographed by Julia Margaret Cameron

On 2 January, 1869, James was appointed a Vice-Chancellor of the Court of Chancery, receiving the customary knighthood. The next year, 1870, he was appointed a Lord Justice of Appeal of the Court of Appeal in Chancery. He was also sworn to the Privy Council.

He had a reputation as an eminent and shrewd judge, learned in the law, with a talent for concise but clear enunciation of principles. While on the Court of Appeal in Chancery, he decided several cases under the Companies Acts and the Bankruptcy Act 1869 (32 & 33 Vict. c. 71). Lambe v Eames is a leading case on the construction of declarations of trust, and Ex parte Mackay is a foundational case in bankruptcy law. In Tamplin v James he gave the decision concerning the availability of specific performance for a breach of contract induced by mistake.

In 1874, James gave the decision of the Judicial Committee of the Privy Council in a significant constitutional case from Canada, Maher v Town Council of Portland. The case concerned the interpretation of section 93 of the British North America Act 1867 (now the Constitution Act, 1867), dealing with publicly funded religious separate schools, and has been cited by the Canadian courts in subsequent cases dealing with separate schools.

== Interest in India ==
In addition to sitting on the commission relating to Indian legal matters, James had a personal interest in India and its position in the Empire. Prior to his appointment to the bench, he began writing a planned two-volume text on India, but did not complete it due to his judicial workload and ill-health. His daughter, Mary Salis Schwabe, completed the editorial work on the first volume, which was published the year after James's death.

== Later life and death ==
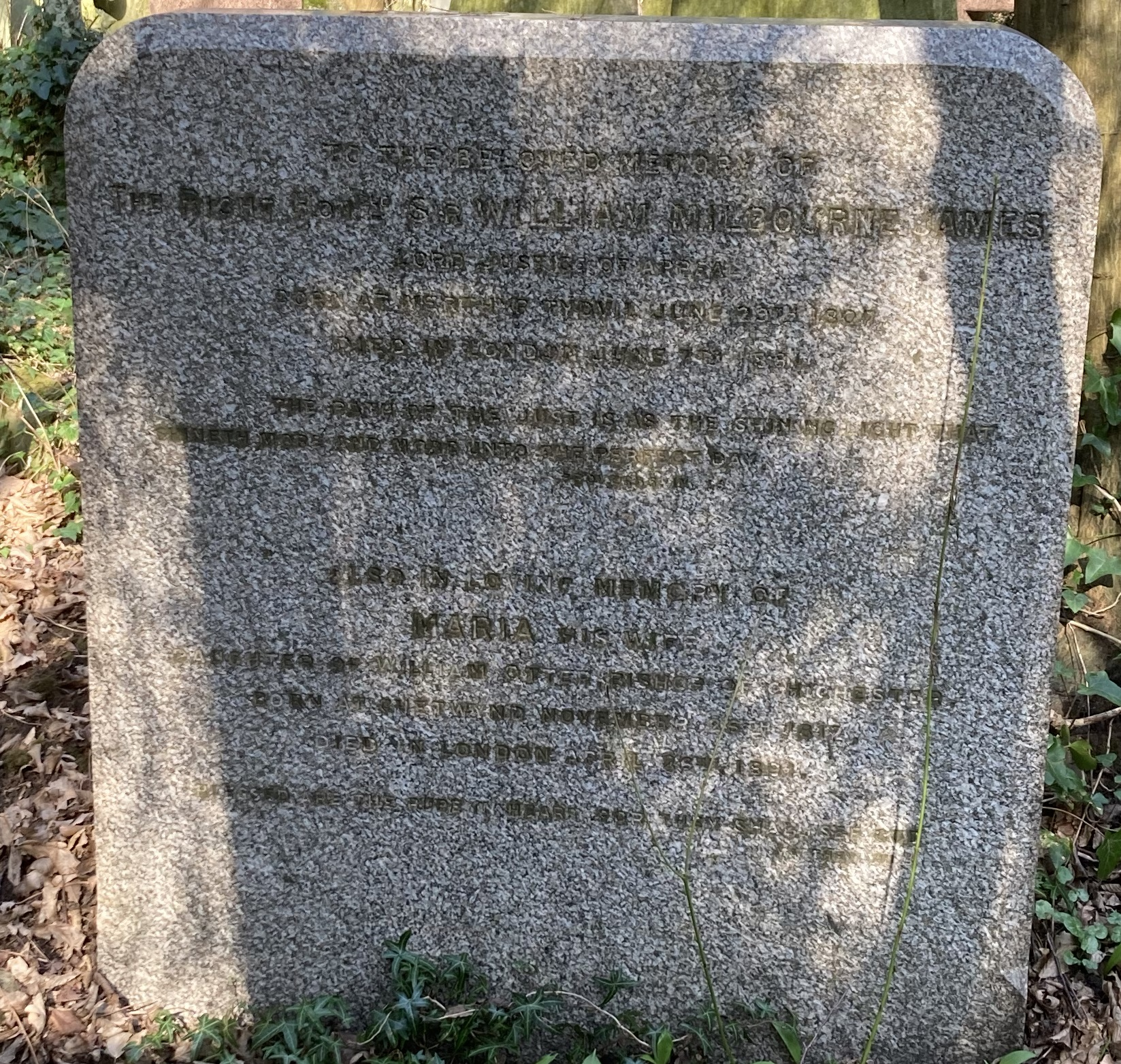
Grave of William Milbourne James in Highgate Cemetery (west side)

James died in 1881 at his London residence, 47 Wimpole Street, and is buried at Highgate Cemetery.

== Judgments ==
- Lambe v Eames (1871) LR 6 Ch App 597
- Ex parte Mackay (1873) LR 8 Ch App 643
- Maher v Town Council of Portland (1874) Wheeler's Confederation Law of Canada (London: Eyre & Spottiswoode, 1896), pp. 362-366
- Tamplin v James (1880) 15 Ch D 215 (CA)

== Publications ==
Sir William Milbourne James, "The British in India" (London: MacMillan and Co., 1882); edited by Mary J. Salis Schwabe.

== Arms ==
Coat of arms of William Milbourne James
Notes Displayed on a wooden panel on the western wall of the Great Hall at Lincoln's Inn. Crest A cock Gules gorged with a collar gemel Or the dexter claw resting on a portcullis chained of the last. Escutcheon Or a chevron Vair between three lions’ heads erased Gules. Motto Gwna A Ddyled Doed A Ddel

== Bibliography ==
- Lloyd, John Edward; Jenkins, R.T. (1958). The Dictionary of Welsh Biography, Down to 1940. Cardiff: William Lewis.
