= R v Friesen =

Supreme Court of Canada 2020 case

- Supreme Court of Canada

Hearing: October 16, 2019 Judgment: October 16, 2019
- Full case name: Her Majesty the Queen v Justyn Kyle Napoleon Friesen
- Citations: 2020 SCC 9
- Docket No.: 38300
- Prior history: Judgment for defendant in the Court of Appeal for Manitoba
- Ruling: Appeal allowed

Court membership
- Chief Justice: Richard Wagner; Puisne Justices: Rosalie Abella, Michael Moldaver, Andromache Karakatsanis, Suzanne Côté, Russell Brown, Malcolm Rowe, Sheilah Martin, Nicholas Kasirer

Reasons given
- Unanimous reasons by: Wagner C.J. and Rowe J

R v Friesen, 2020 SCC 9 is a major decision by the Supreme Court of Canada on sentencing for sexual offences against children and the principle of parity. The Court held that sentences for offences involving the sexual abuse of children should be increased to reflect contemporary social understanding of the harms associated with such conduct, and Parliament's repeated signals to increase sentences through amendments to the Criminal Code. The court also held that the principle of parity, which requires similar sentences to be imposed for similar conduct, must be read in conjunction with the broader principle of proportionality.

== Background ==
The defendant in the case, Justyn Friesen, met the 4 year old victim's mother on an online dating website. When the mother invited Friesen to her residence they engaged in consensual sexual intercourse, eventually Friesen told her to bring the victim to the room at which point he sexually assaulted the child. Her cries awoke the mothers friend who removed her from the room, leading to Friesen threatening to accuse the mother of abusing her 1-year-old son unless she brought the daughter back to the room. The mother's friend confronted Friesen at which he point he fled the residence, he was subsequently charged and pled guilty to sexual interference and attempted extortion.

== In lower courts ==
The trial judge sentenced Friesen to 6 years in prison for both offences concurrent. In reaching his sentence he applied the 4-5 year starting point set by the Manitoba Court of Appeals in R v Sidwell, 2015 MBCA 56 for major sexual assaults committed by adults against young persons while in a position of trust or authority. The Court of Appeals overturned the sentence, finding that no such relationship existed, it then substituted a lower sentence of 4 years and 6 months.

== Judgment ==
The court overturned the sentence by the Court of Appeals, restored the trial judges' sentence, and took the opportunity to review sentencing for child sexual offences. calling for tougher punishment of sexual violence against children. The Court also encouraged an upwards departure from prior precedent.

The Court noted that Parliament had consistently increased the maximum sentences for child sexual offences, most recently with the Tougher Penalties for Child Predators Act, and courts should impose stricter punishments to give effect to Parliament's understanding of the gravity of said offences. The court also opined on the objective seriousness of sexual violence against children, saying "we send a strong message that sexual offences against children are violent crimes that wrongfully exploit children’s vulnerability and cause profound harm to children, families, and communities".

In calling for a departure from prior precedent, the Court also commented on the principle of parity, noting that it is an expression of the broader principle that sentences should be proportionate to the gravity of the offence and the offender's degree of responsibility.

Parity and proportionality do not exist in tension; rather, parity is an expression of proportionality. A consistent application of proportionality will lead to parity. Conversely, an approach that assigns the same sentence to unlike cases can achieve neither parity nor proportionality.

— Supreme Court of Canada, R v Friesen, para 32

=== Friesen factors ===
The court also provided guidance on five factors that could impact sentencing:

==== Likelihood to reoffend ====
The Court noted that the fundamental purpose of sentencing was to protect society, and therefore the protection of children from harm was imperative in any sentence imposed against a child predator. Consequently, it directed sentencing judges to impose longer sentences when the offender presented a heightened risk to re-offend. Ruling that there should be a greater emphasis on separating the offender from society in such a scenario and a smaller emphasis on rehabilitation.

==== Abuse of a position of trust or authority ====
The Court first recognized that relationships of trust can exist in a spectrum, overturning the Court of Appeal's finding that Friesen wasn't in a position of trust towards the victim. It additionally re-affirmed that abuses of trust and authority expose victims to more harm and should warren stricter sentences. It further recognized that grooming can in of itself create a new relationship of trust where none exists before.

==== Duration and frequency ====
The Courts ruled that an increased duration and frequency of abuse is an aggravating factor. It found that multiple sexual assaults risk multiplying the harm to children in the short term. Additionally on a long-term basis a prolonged sexual relationship could lead to a more pronounced psychological effect, and the moral blameworthiness of the offender also rises with each assault they choose to commit.

==== Age of the victim ====
The Court found that the disparity in power between an adult and a child increases the younger the child is, and the low age of the victim can be an aggravating factor. It however cautioned courts not to underestimate the risk of harm to adolescent victims, noting that the demographic was disproportionally victimized, and finding that sentences for the cohort had historically been disproportionately low.

==== Degree of physical interference ====
The Court said that the degree of physical interference was an aggravating factor, but cautioned lower courts to be careful not to create of hierarchies of physical acts. Pointing out such sentencing ranges/starting points set by appellate courts in Alberta, B.C, Manitoba, and Newfoundland, and distinguishing appellate guidance in Ontario as a proper example of assessing degree of physical interference.

==== Victim participation ====
The Court rebuked the notion that victim participation was a mitigating factor, pointing to Parliament's decision to establish an age of consent. It ruled there was no legal basis for 'de facto consent' under the law, and that the onus for not engaging in sexual activity fell wholly on adults. It also gave guidance to lower courts on how victim participation could be a sign of grooming, which would be an aggravating factor for sentencing.

== See also ==
- 2020 reasons of the Supreme Court of Canada
- R v Sharpe
- Child pornography laws in Canada
