= Tamplin v James =

- Court: Court of Appeal
- Decided: 13 July 1879
- Citation: (1880) 15 Ch D 215 (CA)

Court membership
- Judges sitting: James LJ, Brett LJ and Cotton LJ

Keywords
- Contract, sale of land, mistake, specific performance

Tamplin v James (1880) 15 Ch D 215 is an English contract law case concerning the availability of specific performance for a breach of contract induced by mistake. The case established that if a person enters a contract under a mistake that was not induced by the other party to the contract, specific performance may be awarded against the person if no hardship amounting to clear injustice would be inflicted on the person by holding him/her to the contract.

The High Court of Australia has described its proposition as "a party to a contract cannot... escape specific performance by simply swearing that he did not understand it".

== Facts ==
The plaintiffs (James) advertised a lot of land for sale in the following terms:

All that well-accustomed inn, with the brewhouse, outbuildings, and premises known as The Ship, together with the messuage, saddler's shop, and premises adjoining thereto, situate at Newerne, in the same parish, No. 454 and 455 on the said tithe map, and containing by admeasurement twenty perches, more or less, now in the occupation of Mrs. Knowles and Mr. S. Merrick.

This lot is situate close to the Lydney Town station, on the Severn and Wye Railway, and abuts on other premises of the vendors, on the canal, and on lands now or late of the Rev. W. H. Bathurst.

The defendant (Tamplin) signed a contract to purchase the lot for £750.

The defendant did not perform the contract of sale. He deposed to the primary judge (Baggallay LJ) that he expected that two pieces of garden formed part of the lot, when they were in fact held by a railway company and not the vendor. The primary judge found that at the auction for the lot, plans were made available that showed that the gardens were not part of the lot, but that the defendant did not inspect the plans.

The primary judge made a decree for specific performance to compel the defendant's purchase of the land. The defendant appealed to the Court of Appeal.

== Judgment ==
The three presiding judges of the Court of Appeal unanimously dismissed the appeal, upholding the decree for specific performance. The judges were James LJ, Brett LJ and Cotton LJ.

James LJ held that the defence to specific performance for mistake could not generally be sustained where the vendor did nothing to mislead the purchaser and the mistake arose because of the purchaser's lack of reasonable care (here, the failure to inspect the plans). However, James LJ left it open for specific performance to be excused where:

...a hardship amounting to injustice would have been inflicted upon [the purchaser] by holding him to his bargain, and it was unreasonable to hold him to it.

James LJ found that the defendant's mistaken purchase of the lot did not fall within this category of unjust hardship. James LJ agreed with Cotton LJ (in obiter) that where specific performance is not awarded because of a mistake, the court should proceed to award damages to the plaintiff in lieu of specific performance.

Brett LJ agreed to uphold the decree for specific performance, suggesting that a purchaser could not be relieved from specific performance for a mistake that was not of vital importance to the contract and arose from the purchaser's own negligence.

Cotton LJ also agreed to uphold the decree for specific performance, holding that a purchaser could not escape specific performance for a mistake that "he had no right to make". Cotton LJ argued (in obiter) (James LJ agreeing) that where specific performance is not awarded because of a mistake, the court should proceed to award damages to the plaintiff in lieu of specific performance.

== Significance ==
Tamplin v James is a widely cited case on the availability of specific performance. Brett LJ's judgment is cited in Voumard: The Sale of Land for the proposition that:

For the most part the cases where a defendant has escaped [specific performance] on the ground of a mistake not contributed to by the plaintiff, have been cases where a hardship amounting to injustice would have been inflicted upon him by holding him to his bargain, and it was unreasonable to hold him to it.

The case has also been regularly cited by appellate courts as an authority on specific performance. The High Court of Australia has relied on the case for the proposition that "a party to a contract cannot... escape specific performance by simply swearing that he did not understand it".

== See also ==
- Contract
- Specific performance
