= Patricia Rowbotham =

Patricia A. Rowbotham, KC (born Dec. 8, 1953) is a Canadian judge who was a Justice at the Alberta Court of Appeal in Calgary, Alberta, Canada. She served in the Court from 1999 to 2024, when she retired.

== Education and early career ==
She earned an LL.B. in 1981 from the Faculty of Law at the University of Calgary and an LL.M. from Cambridge University in 1984.

After law school, Rowbotham clerked at the Supreme Court of Canada with Ronald Martland and Bertha Wilson. She then was a bencher of the Law Society of Alberta.

Rowbotham became a litigator at Blake, Cassels & Graydon LLP.

== Judicial career ==
She was first appointed to the judiciary as a judge at the Alberta Court of Queen's Bench by Anne McLellan on June 9, 1999. On June 1, 2007, Prime Minister Stephen Harper appointed Madame Justice Patricia Rowbotham to the Alberta Court of Appeal. In addition to being a Justice of the Alberta Court of Appeal, on the recommendation of the Minister of Justice, Patricia Rowbowtham was also appointed Judge of the Court of Appeal of the Northwest Territories, of the Court of Appeal of Nunavut, and member ex-officio of the Alberta Court of Queen's Bench.

In September 2024, Rowbotham retired after over seventeen years with the Court. She was a member of the Court of King’s Bench from 1999 to 2007.

== Professional Activities ==
Rowbotham was on the board of the Legal Education Society of Alberta.

== Honors and awards ==
In 2002, Patricia Rowbotham received Queen Elizabeth II's Golden Jubilee Medal from the Governor General of Canada.

In 2011, Rowbotham received the University of Calgary's Arch Award, in the category of Distinguished Alumni Award.

She received the 2017 Lifetime Achievement Award from the 2017 Women In Law Leadership (WILL) Awards, presented by the Association of Women Lawyers (AWL) and The Counsel Network (TCN).
