= Belmont Park Investments Pty Ltd v BNY Corporate Trustee Services Ltd =

2011 UK legal case

Belmont Park Investments PTY Ltd v BNY Corporate Trustee Services Ltd & Anor
- Court: Supreme Court of the United Kingdom
- Full case name: Belmont Park Investments Pty Ltd v BNY Corporate Trustee Services Ltd and Lehman Brothers Special Financing Inc
- Argued: 1–3 March 2011
- Decided: 27 July 2011
- Neutral citation: [2011] UKSC 38
- Reported at: [2012] 1 All ER 505 [2012] 1 AC 383

Case history
- Prior history: Perpetual Trustee Company Ltd & Anor v BNY Corporate Trustee Services Ltd & Ors [2009] EWCA Civ 1160 (6 November 2009), dismissing appeals from Perpetual Trustee Co Ltd v BNY Corporate Trustee Services Ltd & Anor [2009] EWHC 1912 (Ch) (28 July 2009) and Butters & Ors v BBC Worldwide Ltd & Ors [2009] EWHC 1954 (Ch) (20 August 2009)

Holding
- LBSF's appeal dismissed; the validity of the contractual provisions was upheld

Case opinions
- Majority: Lord Collins (Lord Walker concurring); Lord Mance

Laws applied
- Money Markets International Stockbrokers Ltd v London Stock Exchange Ltd & Anor [2001] EWHC 1052 (Ch) (10 July 2001)

Area of law
- UK insolvency law

Belmont Park Investments PTY Ltd v BNY Corporate Trustee Services Ltd [2011] UKSC 38, [2012] 1 All ER 505, [2012] 1 AC 383 (27 July 2011) is a UK insolvency law case, concerning the general principle that parties cannot contract out of the insolvency legislation. The principle has two key aspects, of which the Supreme Court of the United Kingdom ruled that only the first was relevant on the facts of the case:

1. The anti-deprivation rule, which is aimed at attempts to withdraw an asset on bankruptcy or liquidation or administration, thereby reducing the value of the insolvent estate to the detriment of creditors.
2. The pari passu rule, which reflects the principle that statutory provisions for pro rata distribution may not be excluded by a contract which gives one creditor more than its proper share.

== Facts ==
Lehman Brothers logo

Lehman Brothers, prior to its 2008 filing for bankruptcy protection under Chapter 11 of the United States Bankruptcy Code, created a package of 19 special purpose vehicles (including Lehman Brothers Special Financing Inc) known as the "Dante Programme". They issued 180 series of notes with an aggregate principal amount of $12.5 billion.

The complex documentation relating to the series of transactions included provisions relating to:

- credit default swap agreements,
- consequential reduction of the principal amount upon certain specified "Credit Events"
- claims of LBSF and the Noteholders were limited to the collateral amount, and there was no right of recourse against the issuer
- the respective priorities of LBSF and the Noteholders in the "Event of Default" or otherwise (ie, LBSF had priority in the first case, and the Noteholders would have it in the second, and the clause was referred to as "the Flip")

A group of 29 Australian investors, headed by Belmont, instructed BNY Corporate Trustee Services Ltd, the trustee for several of the notes in question, to have the issuer of the notes cancel the swap agreement. The Belmont group, together with Perpetual Trustee Co Ltd (another noteholder) launched claims against BNY to realise upon the collateral over any priority held by LBSF under the agreement. LBSF was joined as a party to the action.

== The courts below ==
In July 2009, the Chancery Division of the High Court of Justice found that:

- the contractual provisions were effective as a matter of English law and, in particular, did not offend the anti-deprivation rule as stated in British Eagle International Airlines Ltd v Compagnie Nationale Air France;
- alternatively, if the provisions were capable of offending the anti-deprivation rule, the rule was not engaged because an alternative Event of Default (the Chapter 11 filing by LBHI) had occurred prior to the Chapter 11 filing by LBSF, and consequently the Chapter 11 filing did not deprive LBSF of any property

The ruling was upheld by the Court of Appeal of England and Wales in August 2009. In discussing the nature of the anti-deprivation rule, Neuberger MR (as he then was) observed:

1. the rule is based on public policy, but only to the extent that one cannot contract out of the insolvency legislation
2. where the rule is invoked, it is essential to begin from the elementary proposition that insolvency law is statutory and primacy must be given to the relevant statutory text
3. when considering whether the rule applies to a particular provision, there is, at least in principle, no difference between cases where the provision is expressed to apply on insolvency or liquidation and those where it is not so expressed
4. the courts should not extend the rule beyond its present limits, especially following the passage of the Insolvency Act 1986, save where logic or practicality otherwise require
5. judicial decisions in the insolvency field should ensure that the law is clear and consistent

The Supreme Court granted permission to appeal.

== At the Supreme Court ==
The Court of Appeal's decision was upheld by the Supreme Court. In so doing, Lord Collins in his speech discussed how the anti-deprivation and pari passu rules were designed to address different mischiefs, and how the first rule does possess limits in its application:

1. in borderline cases, a commercially sensible transaction entered into in good faith should not be held to infringe the rule
2. it does not apply if the deprivation takes place for reasons other than bankruptcy
3. there is a distinction between a "flawed asset" (where an interest is always subject to the condition of the counterparty not going into insolvency) and an interest which is granted outright and then forfeited at the onset of bankruptcy, but it remains unclear where the line between the two is or ought to be drawn, and there is no case where the rule can be said to be generally applicable to either instance
4. the rule only applies where the bankrupt's own property is in issue

While all justices agreed that the appeal should be dismissed, Lord Mance did not rely on the "flawed asset" theory, instead finding that, prior to an event of default under the swap, neither the Noteholders nor LBSF had priority over the collateral proceeds. Once the event occurred, the priority would be determined under the swap's terms, and the Flip did not contravene the rule.

In discussing applicable principles, Lord Mance observed that the pari passu rule addresses what happens in bankruptcy, and the anti-deprivation rule addresses what happens on bankruptcy. While conceptually distinct, they are quite closely allied. He also provided a three-part test in order to determine what might constitute deprivation:

161. The existence of a contractual scheme, which is said to create the relevant property interest, but at the same time to include provisions providing for its illegitimate deprivation on bankruptcy, raises several questions: First, how far did the scheme confer any property interest on the subsequently bankrupt party? Second, how far did it deprive him of any such property on bankruptcy? Third, in so far as it did deprive him of any such property on bankruptcy, did this amount to an illegitimate evasion of the anti-deprivation principle?...

== Impact ==
The Court of Appeal believed that the current statutory régime embodied in the 1986 Act provided a comprehensive scheme, and the purpose of the common law could only be to reinforce and back up the statutory rules. The Supreme Court disagreed, holding that the anti-deprivation rule still had a valid place in English jurisprudence. As Lord Collins noted:

102. It would go well beyond the proper province of the judicial function to discard 200 years of authority, and to attempt to re-write the case law in the light of modern statutory developments. The anti-deprivation rule is too well-established to be discarded despite the detailed provisions set out in modern insolvency legislation, all of which must be taken to have been enacted against the background of the rule.

The Court also expressed its preference for objective analysis of what is the actual content of commercial arrangements that have been entered into:

104. ...The policy behind the anti-deprivation rule is clear, that the parties cannot, on bankruptcy, deprive the bankrupt of property which would otherwise be available for creditors. It is possible to give that policy a common sense application which prevents its application to bona fide commercial transactions which do not have as their predominant purpose, or one of their main purposes, the deprivation of the property of one of the parties on bankruptcy. 105. Except in the case of well-established categories such as leases and licences, it is the substance rather than the form which should be determinant....

The point that commercially sensible transactions entered into in good faith should not be lightly set aside is consistent with recent decisions of the Supreme Court and its predecessor the House of Lords concerning taking a purposive interpretation of contracts in order to uphold the parties’ intentions as far as possible. Other notable cases in that regard include Chartbrook Ltd v Persimmon Homes Ltd and Re Sigma Finance Corporation.

Belmont Park was closely watched by The Football League, as it had great implications concerning the validity of its football creditors rule which requires that debts to other clubs or players are prioritised and must be paid in full before the club is eligible to compete again in the League. The Football Association Premier League Limited intervened in the Belmont Park appeal for that reason, and had postponed its own litigation in that regard until the disposition of that case.

In 2012, the Chancery Division ruled that the football creditor rule was valid, and did not violate either the anti-deprivation rule or the pari passu rule. In his judgment, Richards J, relying on Belmont Park, declared:

- the anti-deprivation rule applies from the commencement of administration
- the pari passu principle comes into play only if the purpose of the insolvency procedure is to effect a distribution
- if a transaction has the effect of depriving a company of an asset in order to distribute it among some only of the creditors otherwise eligible to participate in a distribution, it offends both principles
- if the deprivation occurs on the company going into administration, only the anti-deprivation principle will be engaged

== See also ==
- UK insolvency law
