= Andrew Longmore =

British judge

Sir Andrew Centlivres Longmore (born 25 August 1944) is a British lawyer and retired judge.

Educated at Winchester College and Lincoln College, Oxford, he was called to the Bar at the Middle Temple in 1966 and was appointed a QC in 1983. A Justice of the High Court from 1993, he was appointed Lord Justice of Appeal in 2001. He retired in 2019.

== Judgments ==
Key judgments of Lord Justice Longmore include:

- Lomas v JFB Firth Rixson Inc [2012] EWCA 419
- Collier v P & MJ Wright (Holdings) Ltd [2007] EWCA Civ 1329, [2008] 1 WLR 643 - English contract law concerning the doctrine of consideration and promissory estoppel in relation to "alteration promises".
- Three Rivers District Council v Governor and Company of the Bank of England (No. 5) [2003] QB 1556 – Legal professional privilege holding that the client for the purposes of legal advice privilege when large corporations are concerned must have been specifically tasked with obtaining legal advice.
