= Re Jeavons, ex p Mackay =

Re Jeavons, ex parte Mackay
- Court: Court of Appeal
- Citation: (1873) LR 8 Ch App 643

Court membership
- Judges sitting: Sir W.M. James LJ and Sir G. Mellish LJ

Keywords
- Priority, avoidance, insolvency

Re Jeavons, ex parte Mackay (1873) LR 8 Ch App 643 is a UK insolvency law case. It decided that a creditor could not reserve an obligation to himself in priority of other creditors if a company were to go into liquidation.

== Facts ==
Mr Joshua Jeavons had an iron manufacturing business (Joshua Jeavons & Company) at the Millwall Ironworks. Jeavons sold one John Brown & Co. Ltd a patent for improving armour plates manufacture. In return Brown would pay Jeavons royalties of 15s per ton of plates produced. Brown also lent Jeavons £12,500, and agreed that half Jeavons' royalties would go to paying back that loan. It was further agreed that if Jeavons went insolvent, or made an arrangement with creditors, Brown could keep all the royalties to satisfy the debt.

== Judgment ==
The Chancery Division of the Court of Appeal held that Brown had a lien on one half of the royalties only. The agreement that Brown could retain all royalties if Jeavons went bankrupt was a fraud on the bankruptcy laws and void.

;Sir W.M James LJ

It appears to me that this case is reasonably clear upon both points. I entertain no doubt that there is a good charge upon one moiety of the royalties, because they are part of the property and effects of the bankrupt. But, on the other hand, it is equally clear to me that the charge cannot extend to the other moiety. If it were to be permitted that one creditor should obtain a preference in this way by some particular security, I confess I do not see why it might not be done in every case—why, in fact, every article sold to a bankrupt should not be sold under the stipulation that the price should be doubled in the event of his becoming bankrupt.

It is contended that a creditor has a right to sell on these terms; but in my opinion a man is not allowed, by stipulation with a creditor, to provide for a different distribution of his effects in the event of bankruptcy from that which the law provides. It appears to me that this is a clear attempt to evade the operation of the bankruptcy laws. The result is that the order will be varied so as to declare that there is a security on one moiety only.

Sir G. Mellish LJ

I am of the same opinion. The case comes directly within what Lord Eldon says in Higginbotham v. Holme 19 Ves. 88, 92. There His Lordship says:

“This settlement looks forward to a change of intention, to the purpose of becoming a trader, and looks forward expressly to the possible consequences of that purpose; and so looking forward to such a change of purpose, and to such consequences, it is a limitation by the effect of which the estate would go to the creditors; that change being adopted with the express object of taking the case out of reach of the bankrupt laws; and as to the consideration from the covenant of the father, which, though it may perhaps prove worth little or nothing, is to be regarded as a consideration with reference to all the provisions of the settlement, though undoubtedly an annuity, might have been provided by the settlement for the wife in all events, yet it is not competent to a party giving a consideration for a contract that is a direct fraud upon the bankrupt laws to have the benefit of it.”

That is to say, as I understand it, a person cannot make it a part of his contract that, in the event of bankruptcy, he is then to get some additional advantage which prevents the property being distributed under the bankruptcy laws.

It is certainly remarkable that there is apparently no reported case in which this has been decided with reference to a creditor in an ordinary mercantile transaction; but that seems to me an à fortiori case. In the simple case of a man lending a sum of money on mere personal security, and making a bargain that, in the event of his debtor becoming bankrupt, he should then have a security upon a certain portion of his property, it would really be an absurd contention that he should be allowed to have the benefit of the security under the bankruptcy law.

Mr. Fry, Q.C., and Mr. Henderson, then argued in support of the second appeal:—

We have a valid agreement for a bill of sale of the chattels on the premises at Millwall . We applied to the debtor, before the liquidation, to give us a bill of sale in accordance with the agreement, but he refused. We now rely upon the agreement as an equitable assignment, which does not require to be registered under the Bills of Sale Act (17 & 18 Vict. c. 36), but gives us a right in equity to the chattels comprised in it: Smale v. Burr Law Rep. 8 C. P. 64; Ex parte Homan, Law Rep. 12 Eq. 598.

Mr. De Gex, Q.C., and Mr. Finlay Knight, for the trustee, were not called on.

;Sir W.M. James LJ

It appears to me that this contention is most unreasonable. It either is or is not an assurance of the goods. It is admitted that it is not an assurance at law, but it is contended that it is an assurance in equity; that is to say, that the creditors have acquired an equitable right to the goods. If it is an equitable assurance of the goods, it requires registration. I am of opinion, therefore, this contention entirely fails, and that the appeal ought to be dismissed with costs.

Sir G. Mellish LJ

I am of the same opinion. I do not think we are stretching the words of the Act at all beyond what they properly mean. As far as I can discover, this is the first case in which the question has arisen whether the argreement to execute a bill of sale upon certain specific chattels without being registered can be relied on as a valid transfer and assurance of the goods in equity. The only real question is, whether the expression “bill of sale” is confined to a bill of sale which passes property at law—whether it includes a document which is a purely equitable assurance without passing the property at law. The words of the 7th section of the Bills of Sale Act are these: “The expression ‘bill of sale’ shall include bills of sale, assignments, transfers, declarations of trust without transfer, and other assurances of personal chattels.” I agree that this is not a declaration of trust without transfer; but still the words shew that equitable assurances were in the contemplation of the Legislature as well as legal assurances. And then come these general words, “other assurances of personal chattels,” and the question is, ought they to include an assurance of personal chattels in equity as well as an assurance of personal chattels at law? It is very difficult to say, unless it was to include a security of that description, why these general words were added. In my opinion the case is plainly within the mischief of the Act, and I think it is fairly within the words of the Act. No doubt, quâ agreement, it does not require registration; but in my opinion we ought to hold that an agreement to execute a bill of sale cannot be relied upon as being equivalent to an actual bill of sale in equity without involving the consequence that that brings it within the Bills of Sale Act, and that, if it is not registered, the Court will look upon it as invalid.

== See also ==
- UK company law
