= British Eagle International Airlines Ltd v Compagnie Nationale Air France =

British Eagle Ltd v Air France
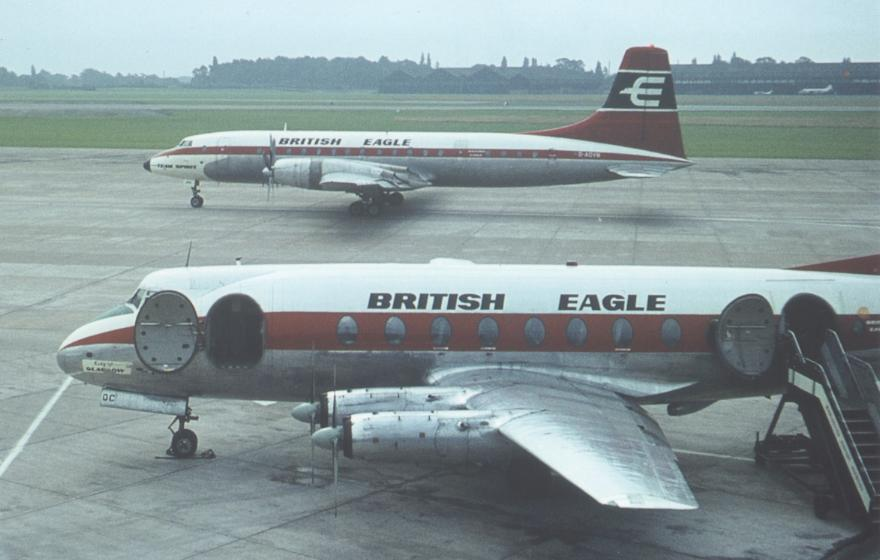
- Court: House of Lords
- Full case name: British Eagle International Airlines Ltd v Compagnie Nationale Air France
- Citation: [1975] 1 WLR 758

Case opinions
- Lord Cross, Lord Morris

Keywords
- Security interest; pari passu

British Eagle International Air Lines Ltd v Cie Nationale Air France [1975] 1 WLR 758 is a UK insolvency law case, concerning priority of creditors in a company winding up.

== Facts ==
A number of airlines agreed to set up a clearing house to manage debt and credit accounts among themselves. Each airline in the group owed multiple and changing debts to one another, so to make settlements easier, participants were not meant to claim against one another, but simply enter their transactions in the clearing house, and then settle the balance at the end of each month. The clearing house fell under the authority of the International Air Transport Association, or IATA. British Eagle went into liquidation, and owed money to the clearing house overall, but was a creditor to Air France. The liquidator attempted to recover the money from Air France and Air France argued it was bound by the clearing house scheme, and could only collect money after netting out the claims of creditors of British Eagle in IATA. So the liquidator challenged the legality of the scheme, as it purported to sidestep the mandatory rules on pari passu distribution.

== Judgment ==
The majority of the House of Lords (Lord Cross of Chelsea, Lord Diplock and Lord Edmund-Davies) held that the clearing house scheme could not put Air France in a better position than it would be, and could not have the effect of avoiding the insolvency priority rules, which would be against public policy. It was unlawful to attempt to contract out of (what is now) the Insolvency Act 1986, section 107. Therefore, the majority in the House of Lords ruled in favour of the liquidators of British Eagle.

Lord Cross gave the leading opinion.

...the parties to the “clearing house” arrangements did not intend to give one another charges on some of each other's future book debts. The documents were not drawn so as to create charges but simply so as to set up by simple contract a method of settling each other's mutual indebtedness at monthly intervals. Moreover, if the documents had purported to create such charges. The charges — as the judge saw (see [1973] 1 Lloyd's Rep. 433) — would have been unenforceable against the liquidator for want of registration under section 95 of the Companies Act 1948 [now Companies Act 2006, section 874]. The “clearing house” creditors are clearly not secured creditors. They are claiming nevertheless that they ought not to be treated in the liquidation as ordinary unsecured creditors but that they have achieved by the medium of the “clearing house” agreement a position analogous to that of secured creditors without the need for the creation and registration of charges on the book debts in question. The respondents argue that the position which, according to them, the clearing house creditors have achieved, though it may be anomalous and unfair to the general body of unsecured creditors, is not forbidden by any provision in the Companies Act, and that the power of the court to go behind agreements, the results of which are repugnant to our insolvency legislation, is confined to cases in which the parties' dominant purpose was to evade its operation. I cannot accept this argument. In Ex parte Mackay, 8 Ch App 643, the charge on this second half of the royalties was — so to say — an animal known to the law which on its face put the charge in the position of a secured creditor. The court could only go behind it if it was satisfied — as was indeed obvious in that case — that it had been created deliberately in order to provide for a different distribution of the insolvent's property on his bankruptcy from that prescribed by the law. But what the respondents are saying here is that the parties to the “clearing house” arrangements by agreeing that simple contract debts are to be satisfied in a particular way have succeeded in “contracting out” of the provisions contained in section 302 for the payment of unsecured debts “pari passu.” In such a context it is to my mind irrelevant that the parties to the “clearing house” arrangements had good business reasons for entering into them and did not direct their minds to the question how the arrangements might be affected by the insolvency of one or more of the parties. Such a “contracting out” must, to my mind, be contrary to public policy. The question is, in essence, whether what was called in argument the “mini liquidation” flowing from the clearing house arrangements is to yield to or to prevail over the general liquidation. I cannot doubt, that on principle the rules of the general liquidation should prevail. I would therefore hold that notwithstanding the clearing house arrangements. British Eagle on its liquidation became entitled to recover payment of the sums payable to it by other airlines for services rendered by it during that period and that airlines which had rendered services to it during that period became on the liquidation entitled to prove for the sums payable to them. So, while dismissing the appeal so far as concerns the September clearance, I would allow it so far as concerns the period from October 1 to November 6.

Lord Morris of Borth-Y-Gest and Lord Simon of Glaisdale gave dissenting judgments.

== See also ==
- UK insolvency law
- Re Jeavons, ex parte Mackay (1873) LR 8 Ch App 643
