= Nicholas Patten =

British jurist (born 1950)

The Right Honourable Sir Nicholas Patten

Lord Justice of Appeal
- In office 9 July 2009 – 8 August 2020
- Preceded by: Lord Justice Collins

Personal details
- Born: 7 August 1950 (age 75)

Sir Nicholas John Patten (born 7 August 1950) is a former member of the Court of Appeal of England and Wales.

== Education ==
Tulse Hill Comprehensive School for boys; Christ Church, Oxford.

== Career ==
Patten was called to the bar (Lincoln's Inn) in 1974 and made a Bencher in 1997. He became a Queen's Counsel in 1988. He was appointed a Deputy High Court judge in 1998. On 2 October 2000, he was appointed to the High Court of Justice, receiving the customary knighthood, and was assigned to the Chancery Division. He served as Vice-Chancellor of the County Palatine of Lancaster from 2005 to 2008. On 8 June 2009, Patten became a Lord Justice of Appeal, and received the customary appointment to the Privy Council the same year. He retired on 8 August 2020, having reached the statutory retirement age for judges.

== See also ==
- List of Lords Justices of Appeal
