= List of Privy Counsellors (1952–2022) =

List of Privy Council members appointed by Elizabeth II

This is a list of members of the Privy Council of the United Kingdom appointed during the reign of Elizabeth II, from 1952 to 2022.

Eight privy counsellors resigned during Queen Elizabeth's reign—John Profumo (1963) after misleading the House of Commons, and four others upon criminal conviction carrying a sentence of imprisonment, John Stonehouse (1976), Jonathan Aitken (1997) Chris Huhne (2013) and Denis MacShane (2013); one, Elliot Morley (2011) was expelled (the first expulsion since 1921). Additionally, Lord Prescott, the former deputy prime minister, resigned in 2013 in protest over politicisation of handling of a press complaints charter being considered by the Council. Sir Seamus Treacy, a lord justice of appeal in Northern Ireland, resigned shortly after his appointment in 2018. Percival Patterson resigned in 2022 noting a national consensus that Jamaica should become a republic.

Peter Mandelson, appointed by Queen Elizabeth in 1998, was expelled in 2026 during the reign of King Charles III. Jeffrey Donaldson, appointed by Queen Elizabeth in 2007, resigned in 2026 during the reign of King Charles III.

== Elizabeth II ==
=== 1952 ===
- The Earl Alexander of Tunis (1891–1969)
- The Earl Fortescue (1888–1958)
- Eric Harrison (1892–1974)
- Henry Hopkinson (1902–1996)
- The Earl of Scarbrough (1896–1969)
- Sir Charles MacAndrew (1888–1979)
- John Maclay (1905–1992)
- Iain Macleod (1913–1970)

=== 1953 ===
- Sir Michael Adeane (1910–1984)
- Sir Edward Bridges (1892–1969)
- Sir Norman Brook (1902–1967)
- John Edwards (1904–1959)
- Thomas Galbraith (1891–1985)
- Derick Heathcoat-Amory (1899–1981)
- Harold Holt (1908–1967)
- The Lord Keith of Avonholm (1886–1964)
- John McEwen (1900–1980)
- The Marquess of Reading (1889–1960)
- Lucien Macull Dominic de Silva (1893–1962)
- Sir Patrick Spens (1885–1973)

=== 1954 ===
- Sir Harold Barrowclough (1894–1972)
- John Boyd-Carpenter (1908–1998)
- Arthur Deakin (1890–1955)
- Sir Lionel Heald (1897–1981)
- Keith Holyoake (1904–1983)
- Sir John Kotelawala (1895–1980)
- Toby Low (1914–2000)
- Sir Reginald Manningham-Buller (1905–1980)
- The Earl of Munster (1906–1975)
- Anthony Nutting (1920–1999)
- Sir Hubert Parker (1900–1972)

=== 1955 ===
- Nigel Birch (1906–1981)
- Henry Brooke (1903–1984)
- Aubrey Jones (1911–2003)
- The Hon. John Hare (1911–1982)
- Edward Heath (1916–2005)
- Charles Hill (1904–1989)
- William Milligan (1898–1975)
- Reginald Maudling (1917–1979)
- The Earl of Selkirk (1906–1994)
- Robin Turton (1903–1994)
- Harold Watkinson (1910–1995)

=== 1956 ===
- Henry Montgomery Campbell (1887–1970)
- The Viscount Hailsham (1907–2001)
- Hugh Molson (1903–1991)
- Allan Noble (1908–1982)
- Michael Ramsey (1904–1988)

=== 1957 ===
- John Diefenbaker (1895–1979)
- Sir Harry Hylton-Foster (1905–1965)
- Ernest Marples (1907–1978)
- Sir Percy Mills, Bt (1890–1968)
- Sir Benjamin Ormerod (1890–1974)
- The Hon. David Ormsby-Gore (1918–1985)
- Sir Edward Pearce (1901–1990)
- The Earl of Perth (1907–2002)
- Sir Frederic Sellers (1893–1979)
- Sir Robert Clarkson Tredgold (1899–1977)
- Dennis Vosper (1916–1968)
- Derek Walker-Smith (1910–1992)
- The Hon. George Ward (1907–1988)

=== 1958 ===
- William Grant (1909–1972)
- Christopher Soames (1920–1987)
- Sir Godfrey Thomas, Bt (1889–1968)
- Sir Gordon Willmer (1899–1983)

=== 1959 ===
- Reginald Bevins (1908–1996)
- The Lord Carrington (1919–2018)
- Cameron Cobbold (1904–1987)
- The Earl of Dundee (1902–1983)
- Sir Charles Harman (1894–1970)
- Sir Malcolm Hilbery (1883–1965)
- Lord John Hope (1912–1996)
- Patricia Hornsby-Smith (1914–1985)
- Sir Philip McBride (1892–1982)
- Kwame Nkrumah (1909–1972)
- Martin Redmayne (1910–1983)
- The Earl St Aldwyn (1912–1992)
- Gordon Touche (1895–1972)
- Richard Wood (1920–2002)

=== 1960 ===
- Cuthbert Alport (1912–1998)
- Julian Amery (1919–1996)
- Chief Nnamdi Azikiwe (1904–1996)
- The Lord Brecon (1905–1976)
- Sir Patrick Devlin (1905–1992)
- Sir Terence Donovan (1898–1971)
- Frederick Erroll (1914–2000)
- Enoch Powell (1912–1998)
- John Profumo (1915–2006) (resigned 1963)
- Sir Gerald Upjohn (1903–1971)
- Sir Roy Welensky (1907–1991)

=== 1961 ===
- Sir Abubakar Tafawa Balewa (1912–1966)
- Donald Coggan (1909–2000)
- The Lord Craigton (1904–1993)
- Sir Harold Danckwerts (1888–1978)
- Sir Arthian Davies (1901–1979)
- Sir Kenneth Diplock (1907–1985)
- Jo Grimond (1913–1993)
- The Lord Guest (1901–1984)
- Sir Milton Margai (1895–1964)
- Sir Colin Pearson (1899–1980)
- Sir Jocelyn Simon (1911–2006)
- Robert Stopford (1901–1976)
- Sir John Vaughan-Morgan, Bt. (1905–1995)

=== 1962 ===
- Sir William Anstruther-Gray, Bt (1905–1985)
- Herbert Bowden (1905–1994)
- Sir Edward Boyle, Bt (1923–1981)
- Bill Deedes (1913–2007)
- The Hon. Hugh Fraser (1918–1984)
- Sir Keith Joseph, Bt (1918–1994)
- Sir Frank Lee (1903–1971)
- Niall Macpherson (1908–1987)
- Michael Noble (1913–1984)
- Sir Richard Nugent, Bt (1907–1994)
- The Lord Rea (1900–1981)
- David Renton (1908–2007)
- Geoffrey Rippon (1924–1997)
- Sir Roland Robinson (1907–1989)
- Sir Charles Russell (1908–1986)
- Ian Shearer (1914–1996)
- Sir John Smyth, Bt (1893–1983)

=== 1963 ===
- Sir Adetokunbo Ademola (1906–1993)
- Anthony Barber (1920–2005)
- Sir David Campbell (1891–1963)
- Robert Carr (1916–2012)
- Sir John Clayden (1904–1986)
- Joseph Godber (1914–1980)
- Sir Kenneth Gresson (1891–1974)
- Sir John Hobson (1912–1967)
- The Earl Jellicoe (1918–2007)
- Sir Frank Kitto (1903–1994)
- Sir Edward McTiernan (1892–1990)
- Sir Douglas Menzies (1907–1974)
- Sir William Owen (1899–1972)
- Lester B. Pearson (1897–1972)
- The Lord Poole (1911–1993)
- James Ramsden (1923–2020)
- Sir Alan Taylor (1901–1969)
- Georges Vanier (1888–1967)
- Sir Victor Windeyer (1900–1987)

=== 1964 ===
- Sir Garfield Barwick (1903–1997)
- Sir Hugh Beadle (1905–1980)
- Tony Benn (1925–2014)
- Sir Alexander Bustamante (1884–1977)
- James Callaghan (1912–2005)
- Barbara Castle (1910–2002)
- The Lord Chalfont (1919–2020)
- The Lord Chesham (1916–1989)
- Frank Cousins (1904–1986)
- Richard Crossman (1907–1974)
- Edward du Cann (1924–2017)
- The Duke of Devonshire (1920–2004)
- Tom Fraser (1911–1988)
- The Lord Gardiner (1900–1990)
- Anthony Greenwood (1911–1982)
- Ray Gunter (1909–1977)
- Denis Healey (1917–2015)
- Peggy Herbison (1907–1996)
- Douglas Houghton (1898–1996)
- Roy Jenkins (1920–2003)
- Sir Elwyn Jones (1909–1989)
- The Marquess of Lansdowne (1912–1999)
- Frederick Lee (1906–1984)
- The Lord Merthyr (1901–1977)
- Fred Mulley (1918–1995)
- Charles Pannell (1902–1980)
- Fred Peart (1914–1988)
- Sir Kenneth Pickthorn, Bt (1892–1975)
- Kenneth Robinson (1911–1996)
- Sir Peter Rawlinson (1919–2006)
- Willie Ross (1911–1988)
- Sir Cyril Salmon (1903–1991)
- Edward Short (1912–2012)
- Michael Stewart (1906–1990)
- Gordon Stott (1909–1999)
- Peter Thomas (1920–2008)
- The Duke of Westminster (1907–1967)
- George Wigg (1900–1983)
- The Lord Wilberforce (1907–2003)
- Frederick Willey (1910–1987)
- Eric Williams (1911–1981)

=== 1965 ===
- Anthony Crosland (1918–1977)
- John Diamond (1907–2004)
- Horace King (1901–1986)
- The Lord Ritchie of Dundee (1902–1978)
- The Lord Shepherd (1918–2001)
- Sir Wintringham Stable (1888–1977)
- Sir Rodger Winn (1903–1972)

=== 1966 ===
- Charles Adermann (1896–1979)
- Alice Bacon (1909–1993)
- The Earl of Cromer (1918–1991)
- George Darling (1905–1985)
- Sir Edmund Davies (1906–1992)
- John Freeman (1915–2014)
- Paul Hasluck (1905–1993)
- Cledwyn Hughes (1916–2001)
- Jennie Lee (1904–1988)
- William McMahon (1908–1988)
- Richard Marsh (1928–2011)
- Jack Marshall (1912–1988)
- Sir Alfred North (1900–1981)
- Reg Prentice (1923–2001)
- Sir Eric Sachs (1898–1979)
- The Lord Shackleton (1911–1994)
- The Hon. John Silkin (1923–1987)
- Sir William Spooner (1897–1966)
- George Thomson (1921–2008)
- Sir Richard Wild (1912–1978)
- Sir Hugh Wooding (1904–1974)

=== 1967 ===
- The Lord Champion (1897–1985)
- Arthur Calwell (1896–1973)
- The Viscount Cobham (1909–1977)
- Sir Geoffrey de Freitas (1913–1982)
- Sir Dingle Foot (1905–1978)
- Judith Hart (1924–1991)
- Sir Seymour Karminski (1902–1974)
- Bob Mellish (1913–1998)
- Peter Shore (1924–2001)
- Jeremy Thorpe (1929–2014)
- William Whitelaw (1918–1999)
- George Willis (1903–1987)
- Henry Wilson (1916–1997)
- George Woodcock (1904–1979)

=== 1968 ===
- Sir Fenton Atkinson (1906–1980)
- The Lord Beswick (1911–1987)
- The Lord Caradon (1907–1990)
- John Gorton (1911–2002)
- Sir Morrice James (1916–1989)
- Sir Thaddeus McCarthy (1907–2001)
- Roy Mason (1924–2015)
- Sir Henry Phillimore (1910–1974)
- Gerry Reynolds (1927–1969)
- Goronwy Roberts (1913–1981)
- John Stonehouse (1925–1988) (resigned 1976)
- George Thomas (1909–1997)
- Sir Alexander Turner (1901–1993)
- Sir John Widgery (1911–1981)

=== 1969 ===
- Errol Barrow (1920–1987)
- Sir Geoffrey Cross (1904–1989)
- Harold Davies (1904–1985)
- The Lord Delacourt-Smith (1917–1972)
- Sir Humphrey Gibbs (1902–1990)
- James Hoy (1909–1976)
- Sydney Irving (1918–1989)
- Harold Lever (1914–1995)
- Sir John Megaw (1909–1997)
- The Lord Rhodes (1895–1987)
- Hugh Shearer (1923–2004)
- The Lord Stonham (1903–1971)
- Stephen Swingler (1915–1969)

=== 1970 ===
- The Lord Brown (1908–1985)
- The Hon. Sir Denys Buckley (1906–1998)
- Sir David Cairns (1902–1987)
- Gordon Campbell (1921–2005)
- Christopher Chataway (1931–2014)
- Frederick Corfield (1915–2005)
- John Davies (1916–1979)
- Edmund Dell (1921–1999)
- David Ennals (1922–1995)
- Ernest Fernyhough (1908–1993)
- The Lord Hughes (1911–1999)
- Sir Arthur Irvine (1909–1978)
- John Morris (1931–2023)
- Sir Leslie O'Brien (1908–1995)
- John Peyton (1919–2006)
- James Prior (1927–2016)
- Francis Pym (1922–2008)
- Margaret Thatcher (1925–2013)
- Peter Walker (1932–2010)
- Norman Wylie (1923–2005)

=== 1971 ===
- Doug Anthony (1929–2020)
- Sir George Baker (1910–1984)
- Sir Robert Grant-Ferris (1907–1997)
- The Lord Kilbrandon (1906–1989)
- The Lord Maclean (1916–1990)
- Sir Alan Stewart Orr (1911–1991)
- Sir Seewoosagur Ramgoolam (1900–1985)
- Sir Eustace Roskill (1911–1996)
- Sir Blanshard Stamp (1905–1984)
- Sir John Stephenson (1910–1998)
- The Lord Tryon (1906–1976)
- Sir Cyril Walsh (1909–1973)

=== 1972 ===
- Lord Balniel (1927–2023)
- The Lord Byers (1915–1984)
- The Hon. Martin Charteris (1913–1999)
- Sir John Eden, Bt (1925–2020)
- Lord Emslie (1919–2002)
- Sir Harry Gibbs (1917–2005)
- Sir Geoffrey Howe (1926–2015)
- Sir Frederick Lawton (1911–2001)
- Maurice Macmillan (1921–1984)
- Graham Page (1911–1981)
- Billy Snedden (1926–1987)
- Sir Burke Trend (1914–1987)

=== 1973 ===
- Sir William Armstrong (1915–1980)
- Humphrey Atkins (1922–1996)
- Gerald Ellison (1910–1992)
- Ian Gilmour (1926–2007)
- Sir Arthur James (1916–1976)
- Patrick Jenkin (1926–2016)
- Norman Kirk (1923–1974)
- Sir Kamisese Mara (1920–2004)
- The Duke of Northumberland (1914–1988)
- Sir Clifford Richmond (1914–1997)
- Sir Leslie Scarman (1911–2004)
- Sir Melford Stevenson (1902–1987)
- Anthony Stodart (1916–2003)
- The Lord Windlesham (1932–2010)

=== 1974 ===
- The Lord Aberdare (1919–2005)
- Betty Harvie Anderson (1913–1979)
- Sir Patrick Browne (1907–1996)
- Michael Foot (1913–2010)
- Lord Fraser (1911–1989)
- David Gibson-Watt (1918–2002)
- Sir Robert Lowry (1919–1999)
- Ronald King Murray (1922–2016)
- Stanley Orme (1923–2005)
- Sir Roger Ormrod (1911–1992)
- Sir John Pennycuick (1899–1982)
- Merlyn Rees (1920–2006)
- Bill Rowling (1927–1995)
- The Hon. Samuel Silkin (1918–1988)
- The Baroness Tweedsmuir of Belhelvie (1915–1978)
- Eric Varley (1932–2008)
- Hugh Watt (1912–1980)
- Shirley Williams (1930–2021)
- Sir Owen Woodhouse (1916–2014)

=== 1975 ===
- Stuart Blanch (1918–1994)
- Sir Nigel Bridge (1917–2007)
- Sir Maurice Gibson (1913–1987)
- Joel Barnett (1923–2014)
- Sir Reginald Goff (1907–1980)
- Roy Hattersley (1932–2026)
- Sir Geoffrey Lane (1918–2005)
- The Baroness Llewelyn-Davies of Hastoe (1915–1997)
- Sir Ambrose McGonigal (1917–1979)
- Brian O'Malley (1930–1976)
- Bruce Millan (1927–2013)
- William Rodgers (b. 1928)
- Sir Sebag Shaw (1906–1982)

=== 1976 ===
- Albert Booth (1928–2010)
- Michael Cocks (1929–2001)
- Malcolm Fraser (1930–2015)
- Reg Freeson (1926–2006)
- Denis Howell (1923–1998)
- Lord Keith (1922–2002)
- Robert Muldoon (1921–1992)
- Len Murray (1922–2004)
- Oscar Murton (1914–2009)
- David Owen (b. 1938)
- Lynden Pindling (1930–2000)
- Gordon Richardson (1915–2010)
- Sir George Waller (1911–1999)

=== 1977 ===
- Tom Adams (1931–1985)
- Peter Archer (1926–2012)
- Edward Bishop (1920–1984)
- Sir Robin Cooke (1926–2006)
- The Hon. Sir Roualeyn Cumming-Bruce (1912–2000)
- Sir William Douglas (1921–2003)
- Sir Edward Eveleigh (1917−2014)
- Eric Gairy (1922–1997)
- Walter Harrison (1921–2012)
- Sir Michael Havers (1923–1992)
- Sir John Kerr (1914–1991)
- Phillip Lynch (1933–1984)
- Dickson Mabon (1925–2008)
- Gregor Mackenzie (1927–1992)
- Sir Philip Moore (1921–2009)
- Robert Sheldon (1923–2020)
- Ian Sinclair (b. 1929)
- Michael Somare (1936–2021)
- David Steel (b. 1938)
- Donald Stewart (1920–1992)
- Brian Talboys (1921–2012)
- Charles, Prince of Wales (b. 1948)
- Alan Williams (1930−2014)
- Reg Withers (1924–2014)

=== 1978 ===
- Sir Henry Brandon (1920–1999)
- Don Concannon (1930–2003)
- Denzil Davies (1938–2018)
- Sir Ronald Davison (1920–2015)
- John Gilbert (1927–2013)
- Peter Gordon (1921–1991)
- Gerald Kaufman (1930–2017)
- Charles Morris (1926–2012)
- Roland Moyle (1928–2017)
- Sir Robert Megarry (1910–2006)
- Ivor Richardson (1930–2014)
- John Smith (1938–1994)
- Sir Sydney Templeman (1920–2014)

=== 1979 ===
- Ernest Armstrong (1915–1996)
- Sir John Arnold (1915–2004)
- Jack Ashley (1922–2012)
- John Biffen (1930–2007)
- Sir John Brightman (1911–2006)
- Mark Carlisle (1929–2005)
- Sir John Donaldson (1920–2005)
- Nicholas Edwards (1934–2018)
- Norman Fowler (b. 1938)
- Michael Heseltine (b. 1933)
- Terence Higgins (1928–2025)
- David Howell (b. 1936)
- Michael Jopling (b. 1930)
- Alec Jones (1924–1983)
- Sir Edward Warburton Jones (1912–1993)
- Peter Kenilorea (1943–2016)
- Tom King (b. 1933)
- Jules Léger (1913–1980)
- Toaripi Lauti (1928–2014)
- The Lord Mackay of Clashfern (1927–2026)
- Angus Maude (1912–1993)
- Alf Morris (1928–2012)
- John Nott (1932–2024)
- Turlough O'Donnell (1924–2017)
- Gordon Oakes (1931–2005)
- Sally Oppenheim-Barnes (1930–2025)
- Norman St John-Stevas (1929–2012)
- Sir Ninian Stephen (1923–2017)
- Thomas Urwin (1912–1985)
- The Hon. George Younger (1931–2003)
- Harold Walker (1927–2003)

=== 1980 ===
- Sir Desmond Ackner (1920–2006)
- Lance Adams-Schneider (1919–1995)
- Paul Channon (1935–2007)
- Sir Antony Duff (1920–2000)
- Sir Robin Dunn (1918–2014)
- Sir Hugh Griffiths (1923–2015)
- Duncan McIntyre (1915–2001)
- Duncan McMullin (1927–2017)
- Sir Patrick O'Connor (1914–2001)
- Sir Peter Oliver (1921–2007)
- Robert Runcie (1921–2000)
- Sir Tasker Watkins (1918–2007)
- Bernard Weatherill (1920–2007)

=== 1981 ===
- Michael Alison (1926–2004)
- Leon Brittan (1939–2015)
- Alick Buchanan-Smith (1932–1991)
- Milton Cato (1915–1997)
- Sir Julius Chan (1939–2025)
- Sir Zelman Cowen (1919–2011)
- The Lord Denham (1927–2021)
- Sir Michael Fox (1921–2007)
- Sir Michael Kerr (1921–2002)
- Nigel Lawson (1932–2023)
- Graham Leonard (1921–2010)
- Allan Louisy (1916–2011)
- Neil Marten (1916–1985)
- Cecil Parkinson (1931–2016)
- Edward Seaga (1930–2019)
- Edward Somers (1928–2002)
- David Thomson (1915–1999)
- Norman Tebbit (1931–2025)
- The Baroness Young (1926–2002)

=== 1982 ===
- Vere Bird (1910–1999)
- Sir Brian Dillon (1925–2003)
- The Earl Ferrers (1929–2012)
- Sir Robert Goff (1926–2016)
- Hamish Gray (1927–2006)
- The Hon. Douglas Hurd (b. 1930)
- Godman Irvine (1909–1992)
- Sir John May (1923–1997)
- Sir Patrick Nairne (1921–2013)
- George Cadle Price (1919–2011)
- Sir Tomasi Puapua (b. 1938)
- Sir Francis Purchas (1919–2003)
- Timothy Raison (1929–2011)
- Sir Christopher Slade (1927–2022)

=== 1983 ===
- The Lord Belstead (1932–2005)
- Peter Blaker (1922–2009)
- Sir Stephen Brown (1924–2025)
- Sir Nicolas Browne-Wilkinson (1930–2018)
- John Compton (1925–2007)
- Sir Frank Cooper (1922–2002)
- John Habgood (1927–2019)
- Neil Kinnock (b. 1942)
- James Molyneaux (1920–2015)
- Sir Michael Palliser (1922–2012)
- Sir Roger Parker (1923–2011)
- Sir Ian Percival (1921–1998)
- Sir Lynden Pindling (1930–2000)
- Peter Rees (1926–2008)
- The Hon. Nicholas Ridley (1929–1993)
- John Wakeham (b. 1932)

=== 1984 ===
- The Earl of Airlie (1926–2023)
- Kenneth Baker (b. 1934)
- The Hon. Adam Butler (1931–2008)
- The Lord Cameron of Lochbroom (1931–2025)
- Kenneth Clarke (b. 1940)
- Sir David Croom-Johnson (1914–2000)
- The Earl of Gowrie (1939–2021)
- Sir Basil Kelly (1920–2008)
- David Lange (1942–2005)
- Sir Anthony Lloyd (1929–2024)
- Kennedy Simmonds (b. 1936)
- John Stanley (1942–2025)
- The Lord Young of Graffham (1932–2022)

=== 1985 ===
- Sir John Balcombe (1925–2000)
- Sir Frederic Bennett (1918–2002)
- Sir Bernard Braine (1914–2000)
- James Fitz-Allen Mitchell (1931–2021)
- Barney Hayhoe (1925–2013)
- Sir Ralph Gibson (1922–2003)
- Sir Iain Glidewell (1924–2016)
- John Gummer (b. 1939)
- John MacGregor (b. 1937)
- Sir Michael Mustill (1931–2015)
- Sir Brian Neill (1923–2017)
- Sir Martin Nourse (1932–2017)
- Lord Ross (1927–2025)
- The Baroness Seear (1913–1997)

=== 1986 ===
- Sir Thomas Bingham (1933–2010)
- Herbert Blaize (1918–1989)
- Maurice Casey (1923–2012)
- Fraser Colman (1925–2008)
- Manuel Esquivel (1940–2022)
- Philip Telford Georges (1923–2005)
- Sir William Heseltine (1930–2026)
- Norman Lamont (b. 1942)
- Sir John Latey (1914–1999)
- Richard Luce (b. 1936)
- Sir Patrick Mayhew (1929–2016)
- John Moore (1937–2019)
- Sir Donald Nicholls (1933–2019)
- Geoffrey Palmer (b. 1942)
- Malcolm Rifkind (b. 1946)
- Sir John Stocker (1918–1996)
- Bob Tizard (1924–2016)
- Sir Harry Woolf (b. 1933)

=== 1987 ===
- Gordon Bisson (1918–2010)
- Sir Rhodes Boyson (1925–2012)
- Lynda Chalker (b. 1942)
- Anerood Jugnauth (1930–2021)
- Robin Leigh-Pemberton (1927–2013)
- The Hon. Sir John MacDermott (1927–2022)
- John Major (b. 1943)
- Frank O'Flynn (1918–2003)
- Sir Geoffrey Pattie (1936–2024)
- Sir Patrick Russell (1926–2002)
- David Waddington (1929–2017)
- Paias Wingti (b. 1951)

=== 1988 ===
- Ezekiel Alebua (1947–2022)
- The Hon. Peter Brooke (1934–2023)
- Dame Elizabeth Butler-Sloss (b. 1933)
- John Cope (b. 1937)
- Sir Brian Hutton (1932–2020)
- The Lord Jauncey of Tullichettle (1925–2007)
- Sir Michael Mann (1930–1998)
- The Hon. Peter Morrison (1944–1995)
- Tony Newton (1937–2012)
- Cranley Onslow (1926–2001)
- Sir Christopher Staughton (1933–2014)
- Sir Murray Stuart-Smith (1927–2025)
- Sir Peter Taylor (1930–1997)

=== 1989 ===
- Paddy Ashdown (1941–2018)
- Sir Roy Beldam (1925–2020)
- Sir Thomas Eichelbaum (1931–2018)
- Sir Donald Farquharson (1928–2011)
- The Lord Fraser of Carmyllie (1945–2013)
- Michael Hardie Boys (1931–2023)
- Lord Hope (b. 1938)
- Jonathan Hunt (1938–2024)
- Sir Anthony McCowan (1928–2003)
- Michael Manley (1924–1997)
- Sir Donald Murray (1923–2018)
- Rabbie Namaliu (1947–2023)
- Chris Patten (b. 1944)
- Tim Renton (1932–2020)
- Lloyd Erskine Sandiford (1937–2023)
- Nicholas Scott (1933–2005)
- Ian Stewart (1935–2018)
- The Lord Trefgarne (b. 1941)

=== 1990 ===
- The Earl of Caithness (b. 1948)
- Helen Clark (b. 1950)
- Sir William Clark (1917–2004)
- Sir Robert Fellowes (1941–2024)
- Michael Howard (b. 1941)
- David Hunt (b. 1942)
- Ian Lang (b. 1940)
- Sir Andrew Leggatt (1930–2020)
- Peter Lilley (b. 1943)
- Sir Nicholas Lyell (1938–2010)
- David Mellor (b. 1949)
- Mike Moore (1949–2020)
- John Patten (b. 1945)
- Richard Ryder (b. 1949)
- The Hon. William Waldegrave (b. 1946)

=== 1991 ===
- Jim Bolger (1935–2025)
- Nicholas Brathwaite (1925–2016)
- George Carey (b. 1935)
- The Hon. Alan Clark (1928–1999)
- Sir Paul Dean (1924–2009)
- The Hon. Archie Hamilton (b. 1941)
- David Hope (b. 1940)
- The Lord Hesketh (b. 1950)
- Sir Michael Nolan (1928–2007)
- Bikenibeu Paeniu (b. 1956)
- Sir Wyn Roberts (1930–2013)
- Angela Rumbold (1932–2010)
- Sir Richard Scott (b. 1934)

=== 1992 ===
- Alan Beith (b. 1943)
- Bill Birch (1934–2026)
- Betty Boothroyd (1929–2023)
- The Hon. Robert Boscawen (1923–2013)
- Virginia Bottomley (b. 1948)
- Sir Simon Brown (1937–2023)
- Sir Anthony Evans (1934–2026)
- Sir Vincent Floissac (1928–2010)
- Tristan Garel-Jones (1941–2020)
- Thomas Gault (1938–2015)
- Alastair Goodlad (b. 1943)
- Sir David Hirst (1925–2011)
- Sir Leonard Hoffmann (b. 1934)
- The Hon. Douglas Hogg (b. 1945)
- Sir Paul Kennedy (b. 1935)
- The Hon. Francis Maude (b. 1953)
- Ian McKay (1929–2014)
- Don McKinnon (b. 1939)
- Michael Portillo (b. 1953)
- The Lord Rodger of Earlsferry (1944–2011)
- Sir Christopher Rose (b. 1937)
- The Hon. Tim Sainsbury (b. 1932)
- The Lord Slynn of Hadley (1930–2009)
- Gillian Shephard (b. 1940)
- Sir Johan Steyn (1932–2017)
- The Baroness Trumpington (1922–2018)
- Edward Zacca (1931–2019)

=== 1993 ===
- Margaret Beckett (b. 1943)
- The Baroness Blatch (1937–2005)
- Sir Robert Carswell (1934–2023)
- Sir Percy Cradock (1923–2010)
- Jack Cunningham (b. 1939)
- Sir Peter Emery (1926–2004)
- Derek Foster (1937–2019)
- Roger Freeman (1942–2025)
- Sir Peter Gibson (b. 1934)
- Sir Denis Henry (1931–2010)
- Sir John Hobhouse (1932–2004)
- Sir Peter Hordern (1929–2024)
- Hubert Ingraham (b. 1947)
- P. J. Patterson (b. 1935) (resigned 2022)
- John Redwood (b. 1951)
- The Lord Richard (1932–2018)
- Sir John Roch (1934-2021)
- Sir John Waite (b. 1932)
- Sir John Wheeler (b. 1940)
- Sir George Young, Bt (b. 1941)

=== 1994 ===
- Jonathan Aitken (b. 1942) (resigned 1997)
- Tony Blair (b. 1953)
- Viscount Cranborne (b. 1946)
- Stephen Dorrell (b. 1952)
- Jeremy Hanley (1945–2026)
- Peter Lloyd (b. 1937)
- Brian Mawhinney (1940–2019)
- Sir Peter Millett (1932–2021)
- Michael Morris (b. 1936)
- Sir Andrew Morritt (b. 1938)
- Richard Needham (b. 1942)
- John Prescott (1938–2024) (resigned 2013)
- Sir Christopher Prout (1942–2009)
- Sir Mark Saville (b. 1936)
- Sir Swinton Thomas (1931–2016)
- The Viscount Ullswater (b. 1942)

=== 1995 ===
- Sir William Aldous (1936–2018)
- The Lord Ampthill (1921–2011)
- Owen Arthur (1949–2020)
- Robert Atkins (b. 1946)
- Sir Robin Auld (b. 1937)
- Richard Chartres (b. 1947)
- Tim Eggar (b. 1951)
- Michael Forsyth (b. 1954)
- Sir Marcus Fox (1927–2002)
- William Hague (b. 1961)
- Sir Michael Hutchison (1933–2017)
- Greg Knight (b. 1949)
- David Maclean (b. 1953)
- Hector Monro (1922–2006)
- Sir Michael Nicholson (1933–2023)
- Sir Philip Otton (1933–2026)
- Sir Nicholas Phillips (b. 1938)
- Sir Malcolm Pill (b. 1938)
- Sir Konrad Schiemann (b. 1937)
- The Lord Strathclyde (b. 1960)
- Sir Mathew Thorpe (b. 1938)
- Sir Alan Ward (b. 1938)

=== 1996 ===
- Michael Ancram (1945–2024)
- The Hon. Sir Henry Brooke (1936–2018)
- Gordon Brown (b. 1951)
- The Lord Clyde (1932–2009)
- Robin Cook (1946–2005)
- David Curry (b. 1944)
- Donald Dewar (1937–2000)
- Don Dixon (1929–2017)
- Lord James Douglas-Hamilton (1942–2023)
- David Heathcoat-Amory (b. 1949)
- John Henry (1932–2026)
- Sir Igor Judge (1941–2023)
- Kamuta Latasi (b. 1936)
- The Lord MacKay of Ardbrecknish (1938–2001)
- The Lord Mackay of Drumadoon (1946–2018)
- Sir John Mummery (b. 1938)
- Sir Mark Potter (b. 1937)
- Sir Geoffrey Johnson Smith (1924–2010)
- Ted Thomas (b. 1934)
- Sir Mark Waller (b. 1940)

=== 1997 ===
- David Blunkett (b. 1947)
- Nick Brown (b. 1950)
- Sir Richard Buxton (b. 1938)
- The Lord Carter (1932–2006)
- The Lord Camoys (1940–2023)
- Sir John Chadwick (b. 1941)
- David Clark (b. 1939)
- Tom Clarke (b. 1941)
- Lord Cullen (b. 1935)
- Alistair Darling (1953–2023)
- Ron Davies (b. 1946)
- David Davis (b. 1948)
- Frank Dobson (1940–2019)
- Frank Field (1942–2024)
- Eric Forth (1944–2006)
- The Lord Hardie (b. 1946)
- Harriet Harman (b. 1950)
- The Lord Irvine of Lairg (b. 1940)
- Michael Jack (b. 1946)
- Sir Liam McCollum (1933–2023)
- Robert Maclennan (1936–2020)
- Sir Charles Mantell (1937–2010)
- Michael Meacher (1939–2015)
- Mo Mowlam (1949–2005)
- The Hon. Sir Angus Ogilvy (1928–2004)
- George Robertson (b. 1946)
- Clare Short (b. 1946)
- Andrew Smith (b. 1951)
- Chris Smith (b. 1951)
- Gavin Strang (b. 1943)
- Jack Straw (b. 1946)
- Ann Taylor (b. 1947)
- Sir Robert Walker (1938–2023)
- Ann Widdecombe (1947–2026)
- Dafydd Wigley (b. 1943)

=== 1998 ===
- James Arbuthnot (b. 1952)
- Peter Blanchard (b. 1942)
- Stephen Byers (b. 1953)
- Sir Anthony Clarke (b. 1943)
- The Lord Clinton-Davis (1928–2023)
- The Baroness Dean of Thornton-le-Fylde (1943–2018)
- Paul East (1946–2023)
- Doug Graham (b. 1942)
- The Lord Graham of Edmonton (1925–2020)
- The Lord Harris of Greenwich (1930–2001)
- Adam Ingram (b. 1947)
- Sir Robin Janvrin (b. 1946)
- The Baroness Jay of Paddington (b. 1939)
- Tessa Jowell (1947–2018)
- Sir Kenneth Keith (1937–2026)
- Helen Liddell (b. 1950)
- Andrew MacKay (b. 1949)
- Peter Mandelson (b. 1953) (expelled 2026)
- Sir Anthony May (1940–2024)
- Alun Michael (b. 1943)
- Alan Milburn (b. 1958)
- Winston Peters (b. 1945)
- Joyce Quin (b. 1944)
- John Reid (b. 1947)
- Jenny Shipley (b. 1952)
- Andrew Tipping (b. 1942)
- David Trimble (1944–2022)
- Sir Simon Tuckey (b. 1941)

=== 1999 ===
- Hilary Armstrong (b. 1945)
- Paul Boateng (b. 1951)
- Richard Caborn (b. 1943)
- Sir Anthony Campbell (b. 1936)
- Menzies Campbell (1941–2025)
- Wyatt Creech (b. 1946)
- Terry Davis (1938–2024)
- Dame Sian Elias (b. 1949)
- Derek Fatchett (1945–1999)
- Edward George (1938–2009)
- Dame Brenda Hale (b. 1945)
- Sir Alan Haselhurst (b. 1937)
- The Baroness Hollis of Heigham (1941–2018)
- Geoff Hoon (b. 1953)
- Barry Jones (b. 1938)
- Charles Kennedy (1959–2015)
- Sir John Laws (1945–2020)
- Ian McCartney (b. 1951)
- The Lord Macdonald of Tradeston (b. 1940)
- Sir Jonathan Mance (b. 1943)
- Estelle Morris (b. 1952)
- Paul Murphy (b. 1948)
- Giles Radice (1936–2022)
- Jeff Rooker (b. 1941)
- Sir Stephen Sedley (b. 1939)
- Simon Upton (b. 1958)
- The Lord Williams of Mostyn (1941–2003)

=== 2000 ===
- Donald Anderson (b. 1939)
- Dame Mary Arden (b. 1947)
- Colin Boyd (b. 1953)
- Lord Coulsfield (1934–2016)
- John Denham (b. 1953)
- Bruce George (1942–2020)
- The Baroness Hayman (b. 1949)
- The Lord Holme of Cheltenham (1936–2008)
- Alan Howarth (1944–2025)
- Sir John Kay (1943–2004)
- Sir David Keene (b. 1941)
- Archy Kirkwood (b. 1946)
- Sir David Latham (b. 1942)
- Henry McLeish (b. 1948)
- Michael Martin (1945−2018)
- Lord Milligan (1934–2005)
- Rhodri Morgan (1939–2017)
- Sir Jonathan Parker (b. 1937)
- Tom Pendry (1934–2023)
- Lord Prosser (1934–2015)
- Sir Bernard Rix (b. 1944)
- Lord Sutherland (1932–2025)
- Jim Wallace (1954–2026)

=== 2001 ===
- Kevin Barron (b. 1946)
- The Baroness Blackstone (b. 1942)
- Keith Bradley (b. 1950)
- Charles Clarke (b. 1950)
- Iain Duncan Smith (b. 1954)
- Sir John Dyson (b. 1943)
- Peter Hain (b. 1950)
- Patricia Hewitt (b. 1948)
- John Hutton (b. 1955)
- Sir Andrew Longmore (b. 1944)
- Lord MacLean (b. 1938)
- Jack McConnell (b. 1960)
- The Lord McIntosh of Haringey (1933–2010)
- Lord Marnoch (b. 1938)
- Sir Mekere Morauta (1946–2020)
- Lord Osborne (b. 1937)
- Lord Penrose (1938–2025)
- Nick Raynsford (b. 1945)
- The Baroness Scotland of Asthal (b. 1955)
- John Spellar (b. 1947)
- The Baroness Symons of Vernham Dean (b. 1951)

=== 2002 ===
- Sir Scott Baker (b. 1937)
- John Battle (b. 1951)
- Sir Robert Carnwath (b. 1945)
- George Foulkes (b. 1942)
- Lord Gill (b. 1942)
- The Lord Goldsmith (b. 1950)
- The Lord Grocott (b. 1940)
- Lord Hamilton (b. 1942)
- Oliver Letwin (b. 1956)
- Lord Macfadyen (1945–2008)
- Dawn Primarolo (b. 1954)
- Dame Janet Smith (b. 1940)
- Rowan Williams (b. 1950)

=== 2003 ===
- The Baroness Amos (b. 1954)
- Hilary Benn (b. 1953)
- Jean Corston (b. 1942)
- Lady Cosgrove (b. 1946)
- The Lord Falconer of Thoroton (b. 1951)
- Keith Hill (b. 1943)
- Margaret Hodge (b. 1944)
- Alan Johnson (b. 1950)
- Jane Kennedy (b. 1958)
- Tommy McAvoy (1943–2024)
- Theresa May (b. 1956)
- Jacqui Smith (b. 1962)
- Sir John Thomas (b. 1947)
- Brian Wilson (b. 1948)

=== 2004 ===
- The Lord Butler of Brockwell (b. 1938)
- Sir Dennis Byron (b. 1943)
- Sir John Chilcot (1939–2021)
- Perry Christie (b. 1943)
- Ann Clwyd (1937–2023)
- Michael de la Bastide (1937–2024)
- The Lord Elis-Thomas (1946–2025)
- Sir William Gage (1938–2023)
- Sir Anthony Hooper (b. 1937)
- Beverley Hughes (b. 1950)
- The Lord Inge (1935–2022)
- Sir Robin Jacob (b. 1941)
- Sir Maurice Kay (b. 1942)
- Ruth Kelly (b. 1968)
- Sir Brian Kerr (1948–2020)
- John McFall (b. 1944)
- Michael Mates (b. 1934)
- Keith Mitchell (b. 1946)
- Sir David Neuberger (b. 1948)
- George Reid (1939–2025)
- Dame Joan Sawyer (b. 1940)
- Sir Nicholas Wall (1945–2017)

=== 2005 ===
- Lord Abernethy (b. 1938)
- Bob Ainsworth (b. 1952)
- Douglas Alexander (b. 1967)
- Hazel Blears (b. 1956)
- Des Browne (b. 1952)
- David Cameron (b. 1966)
- Sir David Edward (b. 1934)
- Dame Heather Hallett (b. 1949)
- George Howarth (1949–2026)
- Francis Jacobs (b. 1939)
- Lord Johnston (1942–2008)
- Sir Timothy Lloyd (b. 1946)
- Denis MacShane (b. 1948) (resigned 2013)
- Patrick McLoughlin (b. 1957)
- The Lord McNally (b. 1943)
- David Miliband (b. 1965)
- Sir Martin Moore-Bick (b. 1946)
- Sir Alan Moses (b. 1945)
- Said Musa (b. 1944)
- Lord Nimmo Smith (b. 1942)
- Ian Paisley (1926–2014)
- Lord Philip (b. 1942)
- Sir Stephen Richards (b. 1950)
- The Lord Roper (1935–2016)
- John Sentamu (b. 1949)
- Sir John Sheil (b. 1938)
- The Lord Whitty (b. 1943)
- Sir Nicholas Wilson (b. 1945)

=== 2006 ===
- Elish Angiolini (b. 1960)
- The Baroness Ashton of Upholland (b. 1956)
- Malcolm Bruce (b. 1944)
- The Lord Davies of Oldham (1939–2026)
- Sir Anthony Hughes (b. 1948)
- Lord Kingarth (b. 1949)
- Sir Brian Leveson (b. 1949)
- The Earl Peel (b. 1947)
- Stephen Timms (b. 1955)
- Keith Vaz (b. 1956)
- The Lord Warner (b. 1940)
- Rosie Winterton (b. 1958)

=== 2007 ===
- Ed Balls (b. 1967)
- Andy Burnham (b. 1970)
- Sir Lawrence Collins (b. 1941)
- Yvette Cooper (b. 1969)
- Jeffrey Donaldson (b. 1962) (expelled 2026)
- Christopher Geidt (b. 1961)
- Sir Paul Girvan (b. 1948)
- David Hanson (b. 1957)
- Sir Malachy Higgins (b. 1944)
- Tony McNulty (b. 1958)
- The Lord Malloch-Brown (b. 1953)
- Ed Miliband (b. 1969)
- Elliot Morley (b. 1952) (expelled 2011)
- Lady Paton (b. 1952)
- Sir Nicholas Pumfrey (1951–2007)
- James Purnell (b. 1970)
- Sir Colin Rimer (b. 1944)
- Peter Robinson (b. 1948)
- Alex Salmond (1954–2024)
- Sir Roger Toulson (1946–2017)
- Lord Wheatley (b. 1941)
- The Lord Williamson of Horton (1934–2015)
- Shaun Woodward (b. 1958)

=== 2008 ===
- Sir Richard Aikens (b. 1948)
- Sir Stanley Burnton (b. 1942)
- Liam Byrne (b. 1970)
- Lord Carloway (b. 1954)
- Nick Clegg (b. 1967)
- The Lord Drayson (b. 1960)
- Sir Terence Etherton (1951–2025)
- Caroline Flint (b. 1961)
- Sir John Goldring (b. 1944)
- John Healey (b. 1960)
- Sir Rupert Jackson (b. 1948)
- Jim Knight (b. 1965)
- David Lammy (b. 1972)
- Pat McFadden (b. 1965)
- Anne McGuire (b. 1949)
- Jim Murphy (b. 1967)
- Lord Reed (b. 1956)
- The Baroness Royall of Blaisdon (b. 1955)
- Malcolm Wicks (1947–2012)
- Michael Wills (b. 1952)

=== 2009 ===
- The Lord Adonis (b. 1963)
- The Baroness Anelay of St Johns (b. 1947)
- The Lord Bassam of Brighton (b. 1953)
- John Bercow (b. 1963)
- Ben Bradshaw (b. 1960)
- Sir Patrick Coghlin (b. 1945)
- The Lord Darzi of Denham (b. 1960)
- The Baroness D'Souza (b. 1944)
- Sir Patrick Elias (b. 1947)
- Sir Lawrence Freedman (b. 1948)
- Sir Martin Gilbert (1936–2015)
- Paul Goggins (1953–2014)
- Kim Howells (b. 1946)
- The Lord Hunt of Kings Heath (b. 1949)
- Sir Roderic Lyne (b. 1948)
- Sadiq Khan (b. 1970)
- Sir Declan Morgan (b. 1952)
- Sir James Munby (1948–2026)
- Mike O'Brien (b. 1954)
- Sir Nicholas Patten (b. 1950)
- The Lord Paul (1931–2025)
- The Baroness Prashar (b. 1948)
- The Lord Shutt of Greetland (1942–2020)
- Angela Smith (b. 1959)
- Sir Jeremy Sullivan (b. 1945)
- The Baroness Vadera (b. 1962)

=== 2010 ===
- Danny Alexander (b. 1972)
- Lord Bonomy (b. 1946)
- Vince Cable (b. 1943)
- Alistair Carmichael (b. 1965)
- Greg Clark (b. 1967)
- The Lord Dholakia (b. 1937)
- Nigel Dodds (b. 1958)
- Alan Duncan (b. 1957)
- Don Foster (b. 1947)
- Liam Fox (b. 1961)
- Mark Francois (b. 1965)
- Alex Fergusson (1949–2018)
- Cheryl Gillan (1952–2021)
- Michael Gove (b. 1967)
- Chris Grayling (b. 1962)
- Dominic Grieve (b. 1956)
- Philip Hammond (b. 1955)
- Nick Herbert (b. 1963)
- Chris Huhne (b. 1954) (resigned 2013)
- Simon Hughes (b. 1951)
- Jeremy Hunt (b. 1966)
- Carwyn Jones (b. 1967)
- Andrew Lansley (b. 1956)
- David Laws (b. 1965)
- David Lidington (b. 1956)
- Andrew Mitchell (b. 1956)
- Michael Moore (b. 1965)
- David Mundell (b. 1962)
- The Baroness Neville-Jones (b. 1939)
- George Osborne (b. 1971)
- James Paice (b. 1949)
- Dame Janet Paraskeva (b. 1946)
- Owen Paterson (b. 1956)
- Eric Pickles (b. 1952)
- Sir Christopher Pitchford (1947–2017)
- John Randall (b. 1955)
- Peter Riddell (b. 1948)
- Andrew Robathan (b. 1951)
- Joan Ruddock (b. 1943)
- Grant Shapps (b. 1968)
- Caroline Spelman (b. 1958)
- Hugo Swire (b. 1959)
- Theresa Villiers (b. 1968)
- The Baroness Warsi (b. 1971)
- The Lord West of Spithead (b. 1948)
- David Willetts (b. 1956)

=== 2011 ===
- Dame Jill Black (b. 1954)
- Tom Brake (b. 1962)
- Simon Burns (b. 1952)
- Sir Nigel Davis (b. 1951)
- Sir Desmond de Silva (1939–2018)
- Denzil Douglas (b. 1953)
- Lord Emslie (b. 1947)
- Justine Greening (b. 1969)
- Sir Peter Gross (b. 1952)
- Sir David Kitchin (b. 1955)
- Sir Kim Lewison (b. 1952)
- Elfyn Llwyd (b. 1951)
- Sir Andrew McFarlane (b. 1954)
- Frank Mulholland (b. 1959)
- Dame Anne Rafferty (b. 1950)
- The Hon. Nicholas Soames (b. 1948)
- Jonathan Sumption (b. 1948)
- Desmond Swayne (b. 1956)
- Sir Peter Tapsell (1930–2018)
- Sir Stephen Tomlinson (b. 1952)

=== 2012 ===
- The Lord Ashcroft (b. 1946)
- Gregory Barker (b. 1966)
- Paul Burstow (b. 1962)
- Edward Davey (b. 1965)
- Michael Fallon (b. 1952)
- Damian Green (b. 1952)
- David Jones (b. 1952)
- Sir David Lloyd Jones (b. 1952)
- Tricia Marwick (b. 1953)
- Sir Richard McCombe (b. 1952)
- Lord Menzies (b. 1953)
- Maria Miller (b. 1964)
- Hugh Robertson (b. 1962)
- Andrew Stunell (1942–2024)
- Sir Colman Treacy (b. 1949)
- The Lord Wallace of Saltaire (b. 1941)

=== 2013 ===
- Sir Tony Baldry (b.1950)
- Sir Jack Beatson (b. 1948)
- The Lord Brabazon of Tara (b. 1946)
- Lord Bracadale (b. 1949)
- Sir Michael Briggs (b. 1954)
- Lord Brodie (b. 1950)
- Alistair Burt (b. 1955)
- The Baroness Clark of Calton (b. 1949)
- Sir Christopher Clarke (b. 1947)
- Lady Dorrian (b. 1957)
- Lord Drummond Young (b. 1950)
- Sir Christopher Floyd (b. 1951)
- Sir Adrian Fulford (b. 1953)
- Dame Elizabeth Gloster (b. 1949)
- John Hayes (b. 1958)
- The Lord Henley (b. 1953)
- The Lord Hill of Oareford (b. 1960)
- Lord Hodge (b. 1953)
- The Earl Howe (b. 1951)
- The Hon. Lindsay Hoyle (b. 1957)
- Dame Julia Macur (b. 1957)
- Stephen O'Brien (b. 1957)
- Richard Ottaway (b. 1945)
- Sir Ernest Ryder (b. 1957)
- The Hon. Dame Victoria Sharp (b. 1956)
- Lady Smith (b. 1955)
- The Lord Spicer (1943–2019)
- Sir Nicholas Underhill (b. 1952)
- Justin Welby (b. 1956)
- The Lord Williams of Elvel (1933–2019)
- Sir Geoffrey Vos (b. 1955)

=== 2014 ===
- Norman Baker (b. 1957)
- Sir David Bean (b. 1954)
- Annette Brooke (1947–2025)
- Sir Ian Burnett (b. 1958)
- Alan Campbell (b. 1957)
- Stephen Crabb (b. 1973)
- Lynne Featherstone (b. 1951)
- Sir John Gillen (b. 1947)
- Matthew Hancock (b. 1978)
- Greg Hands (b. 1965)
- Sajid Javid (b. 1969)
- The Lord Kakkar (b. 1964)
- Dame Eleanor King (b. 1957)
- The Baroness Kramer (b. 1950)
- Norman Lamb (b. 1957)
- The Lord Laming (1936–2026)
- Esther McVey (b. 1967)
- Nicky Morgan (b. 1972)
- The Lord Newby (b. 1953)
- Mike Penning (b. 1957)
- Sir Philip Sales (b. 1962)
- Mark Simmonds (b. 1964)
- The Baroness Stowell of Beeston (b. 1967)
- Freundel Stuart (b. 1951)
- Nicola Sturgeon (b. 1970)
- The Lord Taylor of Holbeach (b. 1943)
- The Viscount Thurso (b. 1953)
- Liz Truss (b. 1975)
- The Lord Tyler (b. 1941)
- Steve Webb (b. 1965)
- Jenny Willott (b. 1974)
- Jeremy Wright (b. 1972)

=== 2015 ===
- The Lord Astor of Hever (b. 1946)
- The Lord Bates (b. 1961)
- James Brokenshire (1968–2021)
- Jeremy Corbyn (b. 1949)
- David Evennett (1949–2026)
- The Lord Feldman of Elstree (b. 1966)
- Mark Field (b. 1964)
- The Lord Freud (b. 1950)
- The Baroness Garden of Frognal (b. 1944)
- Sir Edward Garnier (b. 1952)
- Robert Halfon (b. 1969)
- Mark Harper (b. 1970)
- David Heath (b. 1954)
- Charles Hendry (b. 1959)
- Julian Lewis (b. 1951)
- Edward Llewellyn (b. 1965)
- Fiona Mactaggart (b. 1953)
- Lord Malcolm (b. 1953)
- Anne Milton (b. 1955)
- The Baroness Northover (b. 1954)
- Priti Patel (b. 1972)
- Angus Robertson (b. 1969)
- Amber Rudd (b. 1963)
- Sir Peregrine Simon (b. 1950)
- Keith Simpson (b. 1949)
- Anna Soubry (b. 1956)
- Gisela Stuart (b. 1955)
- Andrew Tyrie (b. 1957)
- John Whittingdale (b. 1959)
- Gavin Williamson (b. 1976)

=== 2016 ===
- Dean Barrow (b. 1951)
- Karen Bradley (b. 1970)
- Alun Cairns (b. 1970)
- Prince William, Duke of Cambridge (b. 1982)
- The Duchess of Cornwall (b. 1947)
- Ruth Davidson (b. 1978)
- The Baroness Evans of Bowes Park (b. 1975)
- Arlene Foster (b. 1970)
- David Gauke (b. 1971)
- Nick Gibb (b. 1960)
- Lord Glennie (b. 1950)
- Ben Gummer (b. 1978)
- Sir Nicholas Hamblen (b. 1957)
- Sir Oliver Heald (b. 1954)
- The Hon. Sir Launcelot Henderson (b. 1951)
- Sir Stephen Irwin (b. 1953)
- Boris Johnson (b. 1964)
- Andrea Leadsom (b. 1963)
- Brandon Lewis (b. 1971)
- Sir Keith Lindblom (b. 1956)
- John McDonnell (b. 1951)
- Ken Macintosh (b. 1962)
- Sir David Richards (b. 1951)
- Lord Turnbull
- Ed Vaizey (b. 1968)
- Sir Ronald Weatherup (b. 1947)
- Sir Reginald Weir (b. 1947)
- James Wolffe (b. 1962)

=== 2017 ===
- Diane Abbott (b. 1953)
- Dame Sarah Asplin (b. 1959)
- Gavin Barwell (b. 1972)
- Richard Benyon (b. 1960)
- Ian Blackford (b. 1961)
- Sir Donnell Deeny (b. 1950)
- Tobias Ellwood (b. 1966)
- Sir Julian Flaux (b. 1955)
- Sir Gary Hickinbottom (b. 1955)
- Sir Timothy Holroyde (b. 1955)
- The Hon. Nick Hurd (b. 1962)
- Sir Peter Jackson (b. 1955)
- The Lord Keen of Elie (b. 1954)
- Eleanor Laing (b. 1958)
- Mark Lancaster (b. 1970)
- Penny Mordaunt (b. 1973)
- Sir Andrew Moylan (b. 1953)
- Sir Guy Newey (b. 1959)
- Sir Rabinder Singh (b. 1964)
- Julian Smith (b. 1971)
- Sir Keir Starmer (b. 1962)
- Sir Ben Stephens (b. 1954)
- Mel Stride (b. 1961)
- Dame Kathryn Thirlwall (b. 1957)
- Emily Thornberry (b. 1960)
- Ben Wallace (b. 1970)
- Sammy Wilson (b. 1953)
- Edward Young (b. 1966)

=== 2018 ===
- Sir Jonathan Baker (b. 1955)
- Steve Barclay (b. 1972)
- The Baroness Chakrabarti (b. 1969)
- Sir Peter Coulson (b. 1958)
- Geoffrey Cox (b. 1960)
- Dame Nicola Davies (b. 1953)
- Robert Goodwill (b. 1956)
- Sir Nicholas Green (b. 1958)
- Sir Charles Haddon-Cave (b. 1956)
- Damian Hinds (b. 1969)
- Kevan Jones (b. 1964)
- Sir George Leggatt (b.1957)
- Dame Sarah Mullally (b. 1962)
- Caroline Nokes (b. 1972)
- Claire Perry (b. 1964)
- Christopher Pincher (b. 1969)
- Dominic Raab (b. 1974)
- Enele Sopoaga (b. 1956)
- Mark Tami (b. 1962)
- Sir Seamus Treacy (b. 1956) (resigned 2018)

=== 2019 ===
- Sir Richard Arnold (b. 1961)
- The Lord Ashton of Hyde (b. 1958)
- Jake Berry (b. 1978)
- Robert Buckland (b. 1968)
- Conor Burns (b. 1972)
- James Cleverly (b. 1969)
- Thérèse Coffey (b. 1971)
- Sir James Dingemans (b. 1964)
- Oliver Dowden (b. 1978)
- Mark Drakeford (b. 1954)
- Philip Dunne (b. 1958)
- Michael Ellis (b. 1967)
- Sir Roger Gale (b. 1943)
- Zac Goldsmith (b. 1975)
- Simon Hart (b. 1963)
- Alister Jack (b. 1963)
- Robert Jenrick (b. 1982)
- Joseph Johnson (b. 1971)
- Kwasi Kwarteng (b. 1975)
- Sir Edward Leigh (b. 1950)
- Sir Stephen Males (b. 1955)
- Sir Bernard McCloskey (b. 1956)
- Andrew Murrison (b. 1961)
- Jesse Norman (b. 1962)
- Sir Andrew Popplewell (b. 1959)
- Jacob Rees-Mogg (b. 1969)
- Dame Vivien Rose (b. 1960)
- Liz Saville Roberts (b. 1964)
- Alok Sharma (b. 1967)
- Alec Shelbrooke (b. 1976)
- Dame Ingrid Simler (b. 1963)
- Chris Skidmore (b. 1981)
- Mark Spencer (b. 1970)
- Rory Stewart (b. 1973)
- Rishi Sunak (b. 1980)
- Valerie Vaz (b. 1954)

=== 2020 ===
- Dame Geraldine Andrews (b. 1959)
- Suella Braverman (b. 1980)
- Andrew Burrows (b. 1957)
- Dame Sue Carr (b. 1964)
- Stephen Cottrell (b. 1958)
- Sir James Dingemans (b. 1964)
- George Eustice (b. 1971)
- Dame Elisabeth Laing (b. 1956)
- Sir Clive Lewis (b. 1960)
- Amanda Milling (b. 1975)
- Sir Christopher Nugee (b. 1959)
- Lord Pentland (b. 1957)
- Sir Stephen Phillips (b. 1961)
- Sir Andrew Popplewell (b. 1959)
- Sir Jeremy Stuart Smith (b. 1955)
- Anne-Marie Trevelyan (b. 1969)
- Lord Woolman (b. 1953)

=== 2021 ===
- Nigel Adams (b. 1966)
- Stuart Andrew (b. 1971)
- Jonathan Ashworth (b. 1978)
- Dorothy Bain (b. 1964)
- Sir Colin Birss (b. 1964)
- Simon Clarke (b. 1984)
- Sir William Davis (1954–2025)
- Michelle Donelan (b. 1984)
- Nadine Dorries (b. 1957)
- Sir Andrew Edis (b. 1957)
- Nigel Evans (b. 1957)
- Lucy Frazer (b. 1972)
- The Lord Frost (b. 1965)
- Andrew Holness (b. 1972)
- Stewart Hosie (b. 1963)
- Dame Diana Johnson (b. 1966)
- Dame Siobhan Keegan
- Sir Paul Maguire (b. 1952)
- Kit Malthouse (b. 1966)
- The Lord Parker of Minsmere (b. 1962)
- Mark Pritchard (b. 1966)
- Angela Rayner (b. 1980)
- Sir Richard Snowden (b. 1962)
- Bob Stewart (b. 1949)
- Nick Thomas-Symonds (b. 1980)
- The Lord Udny-Lister (b. 1949)
- Sir Mark Warby (b. 1958)
- Dame Philippa Whipple (b. 1966)
- Nadhim Zahawi (b. 1967)

=== 2022 ===
- Lord Doherty (b. 1958)
- Chris Heaton-Harris (b. 1967)
- Alison Johnstone (b. 1965)
- Elin Jones (b. 1966)
- Lord Matthews (b. 1953)
- Johnny Mercer (b. 1981)
- Andrew Stephenson (b. 1981)
- Lord Tyre (b. 1956)
- Shailesh Vara (b. 1960)
- The Baroness Williams of Trafford (b. 1967)
- Lady Wise (b. 1963)
