= List of Northern Ireland members of the Privy Council of the United Kingdom =

This is a list of Members of the Privy Council of the United Kingdom who were born, live or lived in Northern Ireland. It is not to be confused with the now redundant Privy Council of Northern Ireland.

== Current members by year of appointment ==
- Sir Michael Nicholson (1995)
- Sir Liam McCollum (1997)
- Sir Anthony Campbell (1999)
- Ruth Kelly (2004)
- Sir John Sheil (2005)
- Sir Jeffrey Donaldson (2007)
- Peter Robinson (2007)
- Sir Paul Girvan (2007)
- Sir Malachy Higgins (2007)
- Sir Patrick Coghlin (2009)
- Sir Declan Morgan, Lord Chief Justice of Northern Ireland (2009)
- Lord Dodds of Duncairn (2010)
- Sir John Gillen (2014)
- Sir Ronald Weatherup (2016)
- Sir Reginald Weir (2016)
- Baroness Foster of Aghadrumsee (2016)
- Sir Bernard McCloskey (2019)
- Sir Paul Maguire (2021)
- Dame Siobhan Keegan (2021)
- Gavin Robinson MP (2024)

== See also ==
- Privy Council of Ireland
- Category:Members of the Privy Council of Northern Ireland 1922 to 1972.
- Category:Members of the Privy Council of Ireland to 1922.
