= John Gillen (judge) =

Judge; from 2014 to 2017, one of the Lords Justices of Appeal of Northern Ireland

The Right Honourable Sir John Gillen

Lord Justice of Appeal
- In office September 2014 – November 2017
- Monarch: Elizabeth II

Personal details
- Born: John Gillen; 18 November 1947 (age 78)
- Education: Queen's College, Oxford
- Occupation: Solicitor, High Court judge

Sir John Gillen, PC (born 18 November 1947), previously known as The Rt Hon Lord Justice Gillen, and before that as Mr Justice Gillen, is a Privy Councillor and was one of the Lords Justices of Appeal of Northern Ireland, from September 2014-November 2017.

== Education ==
Gillen attended Cregagh Primary School, then the Methodist College, Belfast, and Queen's College, Oxford.

== Career ==
He was called to the bar in 1970 and became Queen's Counsel in 1983.

He was appointed as a High Court judge in Belfast, replacing Lord Justice MacDermott, on the latter's retirement. Gillen was sworn in before the then Lord Chief Justice, Sir Robert Carswell, on 6 January 1999. He was awarded the customary knighthood upon his appointment to the High Court.

He was appointed to Her Majesty's Most Honourable Privy Council in November 2014.

In 2016, an off-duty police officer who was representing himself in a house repossession case against Santander that Gillen was hearing tried to arrest him. The officer was himself arrested, on suspicion of common assault, but was released without charge. The police officer was nevertheless sentenced, by Lord Chief Justice Sir Declan Morgan, to three months jail for contempt of court, with the possibility of release after 28 days if he apologised.

From 2015 to 2017, he conducted a review of Civil and Family Justice in Northern Ireland.

== Personal life ==
Gillan is married and has two daughters.
