= List of lords justices of appeal of Northern Ireland =

The Northern Ireland Court of Appeal sits in the Royal Courts of Justice in Belfast, hearing appeals on points of law in criminal and civil cases from all courts. It is the highest court in Northern Ireland, subject to review only by the Supreme Court of the United Kingdom. The Judges who sit in this court are known as Lords Justices of Appeal.

== Current Lords Justices ==
- Sir Adrian Colton, appointed 23 October 2025
- Dame Denise McBride, appointed 4 September 2026

== Living Former Lords Justices ==
this list is incomplete

- Sir Liam McCollum (appointed January 1997)
- Sir Anthony Campbell (September 1998-August 2008)
- Sir John Sheil (September 2004-January 2007)
- Sir Malachy Higgins (January 2007-June 2014)
- Sir Paul Girvan (appointed January 2007)
- Sir Patrick Coghlin (appointed September 2008)
- Sir John Gillen (September 2014-November 2017)
- Sir Ronald Weatherup (appointed September 2015)
- Sir Reginald Weir (appointed September 2015)
- Sir Donnell Deeny (appointed September 2017)
- The Lord Stephens of Creevyloughgare (appointed September 2017-October 2020)
- Sir Paul Maguire (appointed 8 January 2021)
- Sir Mark Horner, appointed 5 September 2022 - retired October 2025
- Sir Seamus Treacy, appointed November 2017
- Sir Bernard McCloskey, appointed 5 September 2019

== See also ==
- Lord Chief Justice of Northern Ireland
- List of High Court judges of Northern Ireland
