= 2013 Special Honours =

British government recognitions

The Special Honours are issued at the Queen's pleasure at any given time. The Special Honours refer the award of the Order of the Garter, Order of the Thistle, Order of Merit, Royal Victorian Order and the Order of St John.

† indicates an award given posthumously.

== Life Peer ==
=== Conservative Party ===
- Richard Andrew Balfe, to be Baron Balfe, of Dulwich in the London Borough of Southwark – 19 September 2013
- Sir Anthony Bamford, to be Baron Bamford, of Daylesford in the County of Gloucestershire and of Wootton in the County of Staffordshire – 7 October 2013
- Nicholas Henry Bourne, to be Baron Bourne of Aberystwyth, of Aberystwyth in the County of Ceredigion and of Wethersfield in the County of Essex – 9 September 2013
- Matthew Hadrian Marshall Carrington, to be Baron Carrington of Fulham, of Fulham in the London Borough of Hammersmith and Fulham – 11 September 2013
- Daniel William Finkelstein, O.B.E., to be Baron Finkelstein, of Pinner in the County of Middlesex – 11 September 2013
- Annabel Goldie, to be Baroness Goldie, of Bishopton in the County of Renfrewshire – 7 October 2013
- Lady (Fiona) Hodgson to be Baroness Hodgson of Abinger, of Abinger in the County of Surrey – 16 September 2013
- Christopher Holmes, M.B.E., to be Baron Holmes of Richmond, of Richmond in the London Borough of Richmond upon Thames – 13 September 2013
- John Rhodes Horam, to be Baron Horam of Grimsargh in the County of Lancashire – 4 September 2013
- Howard Darryl Leigh to be Baron Leigh of Hurley, of Hurley in the Royal County of Berkshire – 16 September 2013
- Dame Lucy Jeanne Neville-Rolfe, D.B.E., C.M.G., to be Baroness Neville-Rolfe, of Chilmark in the County of Wiltshire – 10 September 2013
- Sir Stephen Ashley Sherbourne, Knight, C.B.E., to be Baron Sherbourne of Didsbury, of Didsbury in the City of Manchester – 12 September 2013
- Michael John Whitby to be Baron Whitby, of Harborne in the City of Birmingham – 10 September 2013
- Susan Frances Maria Williams, to be Baroness Williams of Trafford, of Hale in the County of Greater Manchester – 25 September 2013

=== Green Party ===
- Jennifer Helen Jones, to be Baroness Jones of Moulsecoomb, of Moulsecoomb in the County of East Sussex – 20 September 2013

=== Labour Party ===
- Sir Charles Lamb Allen, CBE, to be Baron Allen of Kensington, of Kensington in the Royal Borough of Kensington and Chelsea – 4 October 2013
- Sir William Haughey, Knight, O.B.E., to be Baron Haughey, of Hutchesontown in the City of Glasgow – 18 September 2013
- Alicia Pamela Kennedy, to be Baroness Kennedy of Cradley, of Cradley in the Metropolitan Borough of Dudley – 19 September 2013
- Doreen Delceita Lawrence, O.B.E., to be Baroness Lawrence of Clarendon, of Clarendon in the Commonwealth Realm of Jamaica – 6 September 2013
- Jonathan Neil Mendelsohn, to be Baron Mendelsohn, of Finchley in the London Borough of Barnet – 5 September 2013

=== Liberal Democrat Party ===
- Catherine Mary Bakewell, M.B.E., to be Baroness Bakewell of Hardington Mandeville, of Hardington Mandeville in the County of Somerset– 9 September 2013
- Rosalind Mary Grender, to be Baroness Grender, of Kingston upon Thames in the London Borough of Kingston upon Thames – 4 September 2013
- Christine Mary Humphreys, to be Baroness Humphreys, of Llanrwst in the County of Conwy – 18 September 2013
- Zahida Parveen Manzoor, C.B.E., to be Baroness Manzoor, of Knightsbridge in the Royal Borough of Kensington and Chelsea – 6 September 2013
- Brian Leonard Paddick, to be Baron Paddick, of Brixton in the London Borough of Lambeth – 12 September 2013
- The Hon. James Palumbo, to be Baron Palumbo of Southwark, of Southwark in the London Borough of Southwark – 4 October 2013
- Jeremy Purvis to be Baron Purvis of Tweed, of East March in the Scottish Borders – 13 September 2013
- Mike Storey, CBE, to be Baron Storey, of Childwall in the City of Liverpool – 14 October 2013
- Alison Mary Suttie, to be Baroness Suttie, of Hawick in the Scottish Borders – 19 September 2013
- Rumi Verjee C.B.E., to be Baron Verjee, of Portobello in the Royal Borough of Kensington and Chelsea – 19 September 2013
- Sir Ian William Wrigglesworth, Knight, to be Baron Wrigglesworth, of Norton on Tees in the County of Durham – 5 September 2013

=== Crossbench ===
- The Rt Hon. Sir Roger John Laugharne Thomas, QC, to be Baron Thomas of Cwmgiedd, of Cwmgiedd in the County of Powys – 7 October 2013

== Victoria Cross ==
- Lance Corporal James Thomas Duane Ashworth † – 22 March 2013

== Most Noble Order of the Garter ==
=== Knight Companion of the Order of the Garter (KG) ===
- Air Chief Marshal The Rt. Hon. The Lord Stirrup GCB AFC ADC – 26 April 2013

== Order of the Companions of Honour ==
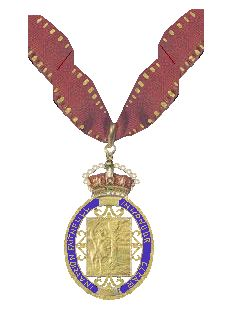
The riband and badge of the "Companions of Honour"

=== Member of the Order of the Companions of Honour (CH) ===
- The Rt. Hon. The Lord Strathclyde PC – 1 March 2013

== Knight Bachelor ==
- The Hon. Mr Justice Thomas Mark Horner – 22 February 2013
- The Hon. Mr Justice George Andrew Midsomer Leggatt – 22 February 2013
- The Hon. Mr Justice Paul Richard Maguire – 22 February 2013
- The Hon. Mr Justice Stephen Martin Males – 22 February 2013
- The Hon. Mr Justice Jeremy Hugh Stuart-Smith – 22 February 2013
- The Hon. Mr Justice Jeremy Russell Baker
- The Hon. Mr Justice Colin Ian Birss
- The Hon. Mr Justice Stephen William Scott Cobb
- The Hon. Mr Justice Robert Maurice Jay
- The Hon. Mr Justice Michael Joseph Keehan
- The Hon. Mr Justice John Ailbe O'Hara
- The Hon. Mr Justice Stephen Paul Stewart
- The Hon. Mr Justice Mark George Turner
- The Rt. Hon. Greg Knight MP – 25 October 2013
- The Rt. Hon. John Randall MP – 25 October 2013

== Most Honourable Order of the Bath ==
=== Knight / Dame Grand Cross of the Order of the Bath (GCB) ===
Honorary

- Park Geun-hye, President of the Republic of Korea

== Most Distinguished Order of St Michael and St George ==
=== Knight / Dame Grand Cross of the Order of St Michael and St George (GCMG) ===
- Her Excellency Cécile Ellen Fleurette La Grenade OBE, Governor-General of Grenada – 14 May 2013
- His Excellency Sir Edmund Wickham Lawrence KCMG OBE, Governor-General of Saint Christopher and Nevis – 7 June 2013

=== Knight Commander of the Order of St Michael and St George (KCMG) ===
Honorary

- Count Jacques Rogge, For services to the London 2012 Olympic Games and British and international sport
- His Highness Abdullah bin Zayed Al Nahyan of the United Arab Emirates, Minister of Foreign Affairs
- Yun Byung-se, Minister of Foreign Affairs

=== Companion of the Order of St Michael and St George (CMG) ===
Honorary

- Dr Anwar Mohammed Gargash, Minister of State for Foreign Affairs

== Royal Victorian Chain ==
- The Most Rev. and Rt. Hon. Rowan Williams PC FBA FRSL FLSW, retired Archbishop of Canterbury – 15 January 2013

== The Royal Victorian Order ==
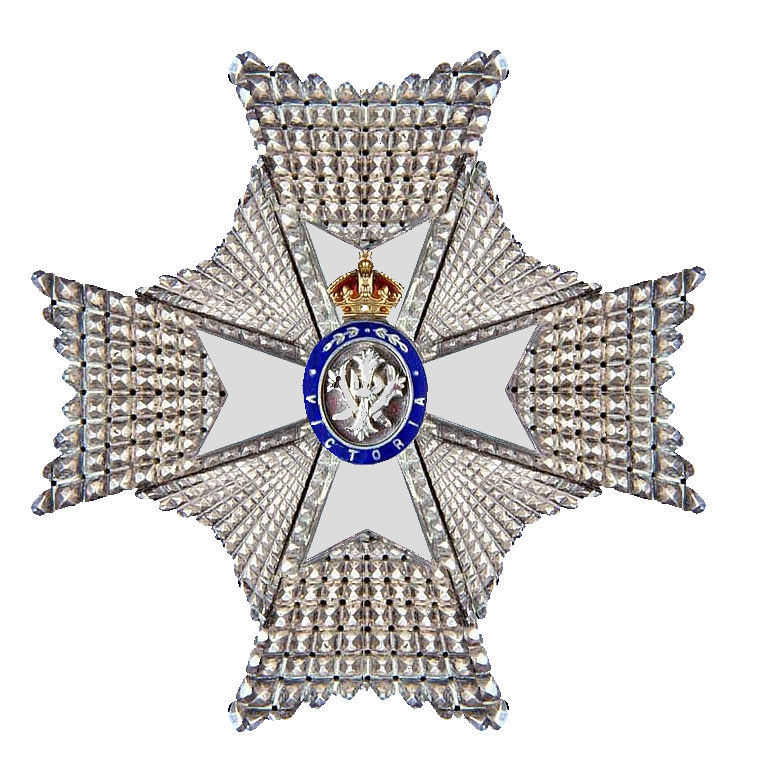
Insignia of a Knight / Dames Commander of the Royal Victorian Order

=== Dame Commander of the Royal Victorian Order (DCVO) ===
- The Honourable Priscilla Jane Stephanie, Lady Roberts CVO, on retirement as Librarian and Curator of the Print Room, Windsor Castle – 30 July 2013

=== Knight Commander of the Royal Victorian Order (KCVO) ===
- Nigel McCulloch, on retirement as Lord High Almoner – 8 March 2013
- Major General George Norton CBE, on relinquishing the appointment of Major General Commanding the Household Division – 12 July 2013
- John Cairns, on retirement as Dean of the Chapel Royal in Scotland – 12 July 2013
- Paul Robert Virgo Clarke CVO, on retirement as Clerk of the Council, Duchy of Lancaster – 30 July 2013

Honorary

- His Excellency Lim Sung-nam, Ambassador to the United Kingdom of Great Britain and Northern Ireland

=== Commander of the Royal Victorian Order (CVO) ===
Honorary

- Abdul Rahman Ghanem Al Mutaiwee, UAE Ambassador to the United Kingdom
- Chul-ki, Senior Secretary to the President for Foreign Affairs and National Security
- Cho Won-dong, Senior Secretary to the President for Economic Affairs
- Lee Jung-hyun, Senior Secretary to the President for Public Relations

=== Lieutenant of the Royal Victorian Order (LVO) ===
- Richard Frederick Griffin MVO, For services to Royalty Protection – 5 April 2013
- Robert Andrew Ball MVO, on retirement as Senior Horological Conservator, Royal Household – 9 April 2013
- Alan Peter Ryan MVO, on retirement as Assistant Property Manager, Buckingham Palace – 30 July 2013
- John Charles Rodger Gray CMG, On the relinquishment of his appointment as Marshal of the Diplomatic Corps – 17 December 2013

Honorary

- Kim Hyoung-zhin, Secretary to the President for Foreign Affairs (honorary)
- Amb Choe Jong-hyun, Deputy Minister for Protocol Affairs (Chief of Protocol) (honorary)
- Ha Tae-Youk, Director-General for European Affairs, Ministry of Foreign Affairs (honorary)
- Seokhee Kang, Counsellor, South Korean Embassy, London (honorary)

=== Member of the Royal Victorian Order (MVO) ===
- Joseph Geoffrey Last RVM BEM, on retirement as Head Chauffeur, Royal Household – 22 February 2013
- Captain Devendra Ale, The Queen's Own Gurkha Logistic Regiment – on relinquishment of his appointment as Queen's Gurkha Orderly Officer – 26 July 2013
- Captain Trilochan Hurung, The Royal Gurkha Rifles – on relinquishment of his appointment as Queen's Gurkha Orderly Officer – 26 July 2013
- Daniel Martell RVM BEM, on retirement as Deputy Head Chauffeur, Royal Household – 30 July 2013
- Squadron Leader Dale Alexander White, On relinquishment of his appointment as Equerry to The Duke of Edinburgh – 18 October 2013
- Michael Robert Sykes RVM, On retirement as Chief Carpet Planner, Royal Household – 15 November 2013

Honorary

- Hyon Du Kim, First Secretary, South Korean Embassy, London

== Royal Victorian Medal (RVM) ==
=== Royal Victorian Medal (Silver) & Bar ===
- Elizabeth Maud Wilkinson RVM, on retirement as Groom, the Royal Studs, Hampton Court – 12 March 2013
- Janet Margaret Doel RVM, on retirement as The Queen's Housemaid, Windsor Castle – 12 March 2013
- Keith Andrew Rembridge RVM, On retirement as Telegraph Clerk, Court Post Office, Buckingham Palace – 30 July 2013

=== Royal Victorian Medal (Gold) ===
- Patrick Joseph Carroll RVM, For services as a State Porter, Royal Household – 31 May 2013
- John Trodden Kerr RVM, On retirement as Leading Palace Attendant, Windsor Castle – 30 July 2013
- Keith Howard GRIFFITHS RVM, On retirement as Courier, Royal Household – 17 December 2013

=== Royal Victorian Medal (Silver) ===
- Warrant Officer Class 1 Derek William James Potter, The Royal Scots Dragoon Guards, on relinquishment of his appointment as The Queen's Piper – 11 January 2013

== Most Excellent Order of the British Empire ==
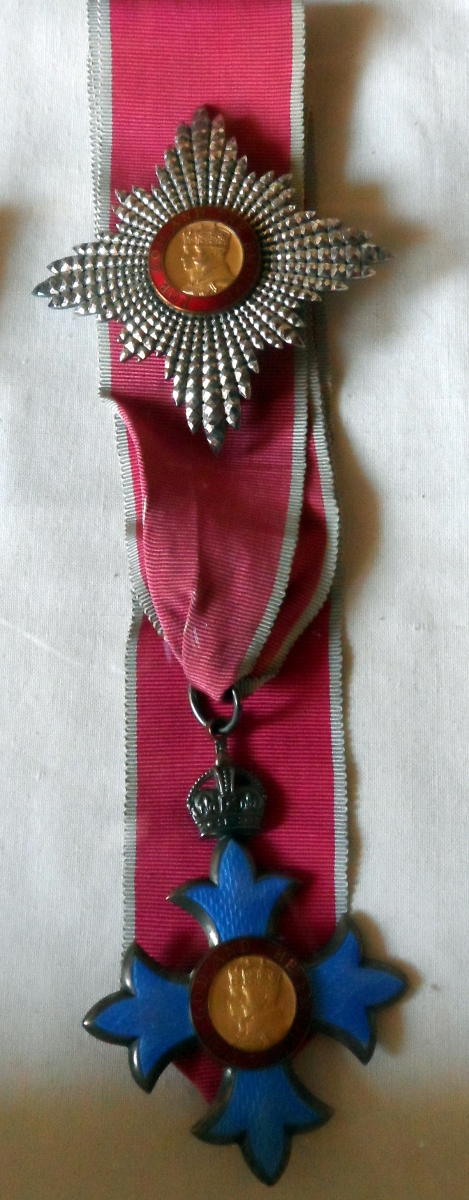
Insignia of a Knight Commander of the Order of the British Empire

=== Dame Commander of the Order of the British Empire (DBE) ===
- The Hon. Mrs. Justice Sarah Jane Asplin – 5 March 2013
- The Hon. Mrs. Justice Janice Mesadis Pereira, Chief Justice of the Eastern Caribbean Supreme Court – 7 May 2013
- The Hon. Mrs. Justice Vivien Judith Rose – 22 October 2013

Honorary

- Angela Ahrendts, For services to business
- Melinda Gates, For services to philanthropy and international development

=== Knight Commander of the Order of the British Empire (KBE) ===
Honorary

- Hisashi Hieda, For services to UK/Japan cultural and media relations
- Richard Lugar, For services to UK-US defence relations and international security
- Minoru Makihara, For services to UK/Japan business and trade relations
- His Highness Mansour bin Zayed Al Nahyan, Deputy Prime Minister, Minister of Presidential Affairs
- His Highness Hamed bin Zayed Al Nahyan, Chairman of the Abu Dhabi Crown Prince's Court
- His Highness Ahmed bin Saeed Al Maktoum, President of the Department of Civil Aviation
- Her Excellency Lubna bint Khaled Al Qasimi, Minister of International Cooperation and Development
- Choi Mun-kee, Minister of Science, ICT and Future Planning
- Yoon Sang-jick, Minister of Trade, Industry and Energy

=== Commander of the Order of the British Empire (CBE) ===
Honorary

- Camila Batmanghelidjh, For services to children and young people
- His Grace The Duke of Rohan, For services to UK/French relations
- Jacques Gounon, For services to UK transport
- Duncan L. Niederauer, For services to the Northern Ireland economy
- Jin Park, For services to strengthening UK/Republic of Korea bilateral relations
- Adam Simon Posen, For services to the economy
- Antoine Jan Macgiel Valk, For services to British public transport and strengthening the Anglo-Dutch Commercial relationship
- Hans Wijers, For services to British industry
- Ahmed Juma Al Zaabi, Deputy Minister of Presidential Affairs
- Khaldoon Khalifa Al Mubarak, Chairman of the Abu Dhabi Executive Affairs Authority
- Zaki Anwar Nusseibeh, Adviser, Ministry of Presidential Affairs
- Dr Sultan Ahmed Sultan al Jaber, Minister of State and member of the Cabinet
- Major General Essa Saif Mohammed Al Mazrouei, Deputy Chief of Staff, UAE Armed Forces

=== Officer of the Order of the British Empire (OBE) ===
Ribbon bar of the Order of the British Empire (Military)

Military division

- Commander Nicholas Geoffrey Dunn, RN – 8 January 2013

Honorary

- General Luis Alejandre Sintes, For services to British/Spanish relations and cultural ties
- Hoda Ibrahim Alkhamis-Kanoo, For services to arts and cultural exchange between the UK and UAE
- Khalid Rashid Shaikh Abdulrahman Al Zayani, For services to UK business overseas and UK/Bahraini relations
- Douglas Burns Arnot, For services to the London 2012 Olympic and Paralympic Games
- Michel Claude Joseph Dubarry, For services to the promotion of Rolls-Royce and wider UK interests in France
- Professor David Frank Ford, For services to theological scholarship and inter-faith relations
- Ehab Abdalla Attia Gaddis, For services to the British community and British Embassy in Egypt
- Professor Eileen Harkin-Jones, For services to higher education in Northern Ireland
- Doctor Eva Henriëtte Reina Renée Lloyd-Reichling, For services to education
- Malachy Stephen McAleer, For services to education and young people in Northern Ireland
- Professor Andrea Mary Nolan, For services to veterinary science and higher education
- Judith L O’Rourke, For services to the communities of Syracuse and Lockerbie following the attack on Pan Am 103 in 1988
- Shunichi Sugioka, For services to UK relations in the fields of commerce and cultural exchange
- Mario Eduardo Testino, For services to photography and charity
- Jean-Paul Pierre Villain, For services to British education and inward investment to the UK
- Susan Janet Wade, For services to criminal justice reform and to the community in Winchester, Hampshire

=== Member of the Order of the British Empire (MBE) ===
Honorary

- Walid Mohmed Al Fagih, For services to the British Embassy, Tripoli
- Farouk Al Najah, For services to the British Embassy, Tripoli
- Shaker Mohamed Ben Milad, For services to the British Embassy, Tripoli
- Stéphane Bern, For services to UK/French cultural relations
- Maria Magdalena Cremaschi, For services to the arts and UK/Spain cultural relations
- Professor Keith Scott Delaplane, For services to beekeeping
- Mary Teresa Doherty, For services to the Labour Party and to the community in Dulwich, London Borough of Southwark
- Desiree Allison Downes, For services to legislative drafting in the Turks and Caicos Islands
- Natalie du Toit, For services to Paralympic sport
- Michel Euxibie, For services to UK/France relations and British veterans
- Doctor Anna Gedeon, For services to the British Embassy in Hungary
- Sandra Joan Hamilton, For services to cancer sufferers
- Tuan Jainudeen Ishak Ismail, For services to protecting British interests in Sri Lanka
- Gareth Paul Mc Callion, For services to the London 2012 Olympic and Paralympic Games
- Shari Lynn McGraw, For services to British interests in the USA
- Antonio Millozzi, For services to charity
- Clarence Hendry October, For services to the community of Tristan de Cunha
- June Antoinette O’Sullivan, For services to young people in London
- Bernadette Edel Porter. For services to nursing
- Pedro Antonio Serra Bauza, For services to the local British resident community in Mallorca, Spain
- Hassen Amer Shebani, For services to the British Embassy, Tripoli
- Eileen Mary Strevens, For services to the rights of disabled children and children with special educational needs
- Brian Neville Tarpey, For services to British war graves in Malta
- Dijana Zrilic, For services to UK/Croatia defence relations
- Jamal Ahmed Al Muhairi, Presidential Protocol

== British Empire Medal ==
Honorary

- Senor Jacques Jean Pierre Coudry, For services to the British interests in Brazil
- Jawaahir Daahir, For services to the Somali community in Leicester
- Titus Anno Sjoerd Vogt, For services to the community in Faringdon, Oxfordshire

== Order of St John ==
=== Bailiff / Dame Grand Cross of the Order of St John ===
- Professor Jonathan Simon Christopher Riley-Smith
- Judith Ann Hoban
- Stuart James Shilson LVO

=== Knight / Dame of the Order of St John ===
- Alderman Michael Roger Gifford
- Lawson Rennie
- Ian William John Wallace
- Willem van der Westhuizen Louw
- Tessa Elnora, Mrs van Antwerpen
- Professor Beverley Joy Wilson
- Elliott Belgrave KCMG , Governor-General of Barbados
- Chen Sze Hua
- Lim Chye Huat
- Brigadier-General Epeli Nailatikau CF LVO OBE CSM MSD, President of Fiji
- Royston Clive Rooke
- Mark Sean Sisk
- Patricia Staples Horne Dresser
- Victoria Mary Sheffield
- Richard Denis Blundell
- Paul Ndiritu Ndungu
- Ian John Rae
- Andries William de Villiers
- Rex Bertie Wheeler
- Colonel Kevin Thomas Williams, SD SM MMM
- Peter Damian Wood
- Shirley Marion Hennessy
- Jillian, Mrs Mludek
- Rear Admiral Frederick Brian Goodson CB OBE
- Peter John Field
- William Arthur Spence
- Susan Elizabeth Pyper
- Alderman Mrs Fiona Catherine Woolfe CBE
