= Sacred Heart Grammar School =

Location
- 10 Ashgrove Avenue; Newry, County Down, BT34 1PR; Northern Ireland; 54.1887°N 6.3277°W

Information
- Type: Grammar School
- Motto: Deus Meus et Omnia (My God and my all)
- Religious affiliation: Roman Catholic
- Established: 1930
- Founders: Sisters of St. Clare
- Local authority: Education Authority (Southern)
- Principal: Shane Comer
- Gender: Girls
- Age: 11 to 18
- Enrolment: 855
- Colours: Dark green, light green & gold
- Website: http://www.shsnewry.com/

Sacred Heart Grammar School, Newry, County Down, Northern Ireland, is a grammar school with 855 students and 51 full-time teachers. Established in 1930 by the Sisters of St. Clare. It is one of Northern Ireland’s top grammar schools.

== Brief history ==
The school was established in 1930 by the Sisters of St. Clare on a site adjacent to the Poor Clare Convent in Castle Street, Newry. Due to steady expansion of student numbers the school rapidly outgrew the original six classrooms and by the 1980s teaching required over 30 mobile classrooms.

The school relocated to a new state-of-the-art complex at Ashgrove, Newry in 1985. It now occupies a 17-acre (69,000 m^{2}) site on the Northern side of the city and has views of the Mourne Mountains to the East. It was formally opened by Mr J. Parkes, the then Permanent Secretary to the Department of Education. A further Science and Technology Block was opened in 1997 by Mr J. Smith, Assistant Secretary to the Department.

== Academics ==
The school offers instruction in a full range of subjects through to A-level. 84.2% of its students who sat the A-level exams in 2017/18 were awarded three A*-C grades. In 2018 it was ranked 19th in Northern Ireland for its GCSE performance with 98.4% of its entrants receiving five or more GCSEs at grades A* to C, including the core subjects English and Maths.

== Musicals and Operas ==
There is a strong tradition of musicals within Sacred Heart dating back to 1956; recent productions have been:

- (2018) - Guys and Dolls (musical)
- (2016) - Cats (musical)
- (2014) - Crazy for You
- (2012) - The Boy Friend
- (2010) - Joseph and the Amazing Technicolor Dreamcoat
- (2008) - My Fair Lady
- (2006) - Oklahoma!
- (2004) - Anything Goes
- (2002) - The Mikado
- (2000) - The King and I
- (1998) - Crazy for You
- (1996) - The Pirates of Penzance
- (1994) - Guys and Dolls
- (1992) - Oliver!
- (1990) - My Fair Lady
- (1988) - The Merry Widow
- (1986) - The Student Prince
- (1984) - The Gondoliers
- (1982) - The Gypsy Princess
- (1980) - Lilac Time
- (1978) - Pink Champagne
- (1976) - Viva Mexico
- (1974) - The King and I
- (1972) - The Bird Seller
- (1970) - The Maid of the Mountains
- (1968) - Her Ladyship
- (1966) - Patience
- (1964) - The Gondoliers
- (1956) - Amos

== Principals ==
No.	Name	Tenure
1	Angela Chambers	1930–1932
2	Sr. Marie Celine Turley	1932–1954
3	Sr. Teresa Mary Fitzpatrick	1954–1961
4	Sr. Imelda Fahy	1961-1965
5	Sr. Máire O'Hara	1965-1972
6	Sr. Anne Thérèse O'Shea	1972-1977
7	Sr. Mark Hollywood	1977-1989
8	Sr. Patricia Rogers	1989-2000
9	Sr. Julie McGoldrick	2000-2017
10	Paul Kane	2017-2022
11	Shane Comer	2022–present

== Notable former pupils ==
- Dame Siobhan Keegan (born 1971), Lady Chief Justice of Northern Ireland
- Aislín McGuckin (born 1974), actress
- Caroline O'Hanlon (born 1984), netball player and ladies' Gaelic footballer
- Valene Kane (born 1987), actress
- Megan Fearon (born 1991), former Sinn Féin MLA for Newry and Armagh
- Liz Kimmins (born 1991), Minister for Infrastructure and Sinn Féin MLA for Newry and Armagh
