= List of people removed from a Privy Council =

This is a list of people removed from the Privy Council of England, of Ireland, of Great Britain, and of the United Kingdom.

Membership of a Privy Council, once given, normally lasts for life, but it is possible for Privy Counsellors to be expelled from membership or to be removed at their own request. In either circumstance it is possible to be restored to membership.

Individual	Appointed	Removed	Restored	Notes
Lord Churchill	14 February 1689	23 June 1692	19 June 1698	Both struck out of the list as being suspected of intrigues with the deposed former King James II.
Earl of Shrewsbury	14 February 1689	23 June 1692	4 March 1694	Both struck out of the list as being suspected of intrigues with the deposed former King James II.
Duke of Ormonde	6 April 1696	September 1714		Struck out of the list after the accession of King George I. Subsequently attainted 20 August 1715.
Earl Coningsby	13 April 1693	7 November 1724		Struck out of the list as a result of a petition from the Leominster corporation arising from his "tyranny and injustice" as a landowner there.
Earl of Macclesfield	30 March 1710	31 May 1725		Struck out of the list after being convicted of corruption and fined £30,000.
William Pulteney	6 July 1716	1 July 1731	20 February 1742	Struck out of the list after writing an offensive pamphlet against both Robert Walpole and King George II.
Lord George Sackville	27 January 1758	25 April 1760	20 December 1765.	Struck out of the list after failing to obey orders to bring up the cavalry at the Battle of Minden. Restored 20 December 1765.
Henry Flood	20 September 1776	1781		Struck out of the list "by the King's own hand".
Charles James Fox	30 March 1782	9 May 1798	5 February 1806	Struck out of the list after making a toast to the sovereignty of the people.
Viscount Melville	31 July 1782	9 May 1805	8 April 1807	Requested to be removed on 11 June 1805, after criticism in the Tenth Report of the Naval Commissioners of Inquiry.
Sir Edgar Speyer, Bt.	22 November 1909	13 December 1921		Struck out of the list after an inquiry found he had shown himself "to be disaffected and disloyal to His Majesty".
John Profumo	8 February 1960	26 June 1963		Requested to be removed after admitting giving a false statement to Parliament.
John Stonehouse	28 June 1968	17 August 1976		Requested to be removed after conviction for theft and false pretences, and being sentenced to seven years' imprisonment.
Jonathan Aitken	21 July 1994	26 June 1997		Requested to be removed after withdrawing from a libel case; police had begun investigating him for perjury.
Elliot Morley	19 December 2006	8 June 2011		Struck out of the list after pleading guilty to false accounting, and being sentenced to imprisonment for 16 months.
Chris Huhne	13 May 2010	13 March 2013		Requested to be removed after pleading guilty to perverting the course of justice.
Denis MacShane	22 June 2005	9 October 2013		Requested to be removed after being charged with false accounting.
Lord Prescott	27 July 1994	6 November 2013		Requested to be removed in protest at the delay in granting the Royal Charter on self-regulation of the press.
Sir Seamus Treacy	12 January 2018	24 April 2018		Requested to be removed.
Percival Patterson	1993	13 April 2022		Requested to be removed in recognition of a consensus in Jamaica that there should be a locally chosen head of state.
Peter Mandelson	29 July 1998	10 March 2026		Struck out of the list on the advice of Prime Minister Keir Starmer following revelations of his continued ties to convicted sex offender Jeffrey Epstein.
Jeffrey Donaldson	15 May 2007	8 July 2026		Requested to be removed following conviction for multiple sexual offences.
Craig Williams	15 November 2023	8 July 2026		Requested to be removed following conviction for insider betting on the date of the general election.
