= Brian Hutton =

Brian Hutton may refer to:

- Brian G. Hutton (1935–2014), American actor and director
- Brian Hutton, Baron Hutton (1932–2020), Northern Irish judge and peer
