= Lord Hutton =

Lord Hutton may refer to:

- Brian Hutton, Baron Hutton (1932–2020), British former judge and Lord of Appeal
- John Hutton, Baron Hutton of Furness (born 1955), former British Labour politician
