= Justice Jay =

Justice Jay may refer to:

- John Jay (1745–1829), first chief justice of the United States and second Governor of New York
- Robert Jay (born 1959), English high court judge
