= Stephen Stewart (judge) =

British Jurist

Sir Stephen Paul Stewart (born 9 October 1953) was a Justice of the High Court of Justice of England and Wales.

== Career ==
Stewart was called to the bar at Middle Temple, where he was a Harmsworth major exhibitioner and scholar, in 1975. He was appointed an Assistant Recorder in 1995 and a Recorder in 1999. He was a deputy judge of the Technology and Construction Court from 2000 to 2003. He was appointed a senior circuit judge (Northern Circuit) in 2003. On 7 May 2013, Stewart was appointed a High Court judge, assigned to the Queen's Bench Division, and received the customary knighthood in the 2013 Special Honours.
