= Brian Kerr, Baron Kerr of Tonaghmore =

Northern Irish judge (1948–2020)

The Right Honourable The Lord Kerr of Tonaghmore PC
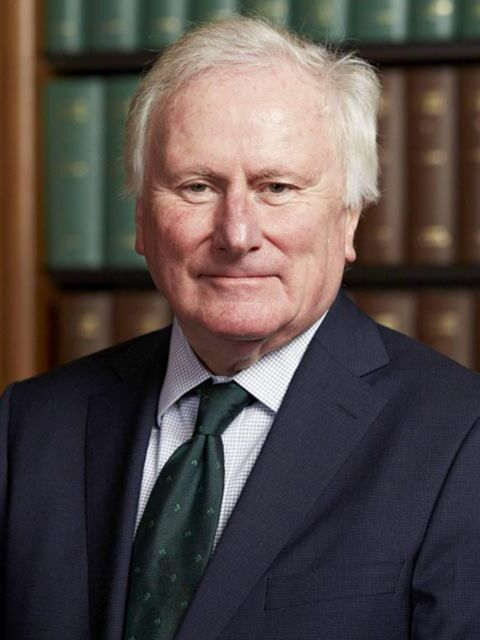
- Kerr in 2016

Justice of the Supreme Court of the United Kingdom (Note: Lord of Appeal in Ordinary until 30 September 2009)
- In office 1 July 2009 – 30 September 2020
- Nominated by: Jack Straw
- Appointed by: Elizabeth II
- Preceded by: The Lord Carswell
- Succeeded by: The Lord Stephens of Creevyloughgare

Member of the House of Lords
- Lord Temporal
- Lord of Appeal in Ordinary; 29 June 2009 – 1 December 2020

Lord Chief Justice of Northern Ireland
- In office 2004–2009
- Nominated by: Tony Blair
- Appointed by: Elizabeth II
- Preceded by: Sir Robert Carswell
- Succeeded by: Sir Declan Morgan

Personal details
- Born: 23 February 1949 Lurgan, County Armagh, Northern Ireland
- Died: 1 December 2020 (aged 72)
- Spouse: Gillian Widdowson (m. 1970)
- Children: 2
- Education: Queen's University Belfast

Brian Francis Kerr, Baron Kerr of Tonaghmore (/kɜːr/; 22 February 1948 – 1 December 2020), was a Northern Irish barrister and a senior judge. He held office as Lord Chief Justice of Northern Ireland and then as a justice of the Supreme Court of the United Kingdom. In 2009, he was the last person to receive a law life peerage under the Appellate Jurisdiction Act 1876. At the time of his retirement on 30 September 2020, he was the longest-serving justice of the Supreme Court and the court's last original member.

== Early life ==
Kerr was born on 22 February 1948 to James William Kerr and Kathleen Rose Kerr (née Murray) of Lurgan in County Armagh.

He was educated at St Colman's College, Newry, and read law at Queen's University Belfast. He was called to the Bar of Northern Ireland in 1970 and to the Bar of England and Wales at Gray's Inn in 1975. He became a Queen's Counsel in 1983 and became a member of the Bar of Ireland in 1990, and an honorary bencher of Gray's Inn in 1997 and the King's Inns in 2004. He served as Junior Crown Counsel (Common Law) from 1978 to 1983 and senior Crown counsel from 1988 to 1993.

== Judicial career ==
=== Northern Ireland ===
In 1993, Kerr was appointed a judge of the High Court and knighted. In 2004, he was appointed Lord Chief Justice of Northern Ireland, only the second Roman Catholic to hold the position, and sworn of the Privy Council.

Kerr regarded the introduction in 1971 of internment without trial in Northern Ireland as having been "calamitous for the rule of law". However, he assessed his Troubles-era experience of the non-jury Diplock courts, introduced to prevent intimidation by paramilitaries, as broadly positive. Citing the "distinguished civil libertarian", Sir Louis Blom-Cooper, he proposed that the non-jury system (in which there was an automatic right of appeal) "was in some senses superior to the jury trial".

As was usual for the Lord Chief Justice of Northern Ireland, he succeeded Lord Carswell as the Northern Irish Lord of Appeal in Ordinary upon the latter's retirement.

=== United Kingdom Supreme Court ===
On 29 June 2009, he was created Baron Kerr of Tonaghmore, of Tonaghmore in the County of Down, and was introduced to the House of Lords the same day. He was the last person to be appointed a Lord of Appeal in Ordinary. On 1 October 2009, he became one of the inaugural Justices of the new Supreme Court of the United Kingdom. He was the youngest member, at age 61. He was succeeded as Lord Chief Justice of Northern Ireland on 3 July 2009 by Sir Declan Morgan.

Lord Kerr dissented from the controversial judgment of the Supreme Court in R v Gnango, in which the court held that a person could be an accessory to his own murder in the context of his accessory fatally shooting a bystander.

In the 2016 Article 50 "Brexit", and 2019 prorogation of Parliament, cases before the Supreme Court, Kerr was a "close questioner of the government submissions".

Asked to specify which had been his most important case, Kerr opted for the 2018 legal challenge to Northern Ireland abortion law brought by the Northern Ireland Human Rights Commission. The law prohibited abortion, even in cases of rape, incest and fatal foetal abnormality, and four of the seven justices, including Kerr, ruled that this made the law in Northern Ireland incompatible with human rights legislation. "One only has to read the dreadful circumstances of the young women who were courageous enough to give … an account of their experiences in order to be struck how dreadful those experiences were... It was an extremely important case and one which I was very pleased to be part of".

In 2014, Ulster University awarded Kerr an honorary doctorate in law.

In August 2020, it was announced that he would retire on 30 September 2020.

== Defence of judicial review ==
Following his retirement, Kerr defended the practice of judicial review and the £56m cost of creating the Supreme Court in Parliament Square. He could understand that ministers might be "irritated by legal challenges which may appear to them to be frivolous or misconceived", but

if we are operating a healthy democracy, what the judiciary provides is a vouching or checking mechanism for the validity [of] laws that parliament has enacted or the appropriate international treaties to which we have subscribed... the last thing we want is for government to have access to unbridled power.

== Personal life ==
Kerr married Gillian Widdowson in 1970, and the couple had two sons. He was a Roman Catholic.

He died in the early hours of 1 December 2020, aged 72. Lady Kerr of Tonaghmore died in July 2022.

== Arms ==
Coat of arms of Brian Kerr, Baron Kerr of Tonaghmore
Crest A hare sejant Sable supporting with the dexter forefoot a harp Or. Escutcheon Paly of six Sable and Argent four swords interlaced in fret the points of two in chief and the points of two in base Or. Supporters On both sides a sea horse Argent finned maned and gorged with plain collar attached thereto a chain reflexed over the back terminating in a ring Or. Motto Familia Semper Amicitia

== See also ==
- List of Northern Ireland Members of the House of Lords
- List of Northern Ireland members of the Privy Council
- The Public Prosecution Service v William Elliott, Robert McKee
- R (Miller) v Secretary of State for Exiting the European Union
- R (Miller) v The Prime Minister and Cherry v Advocate General for Scotland

== Notes ==
Legal offices
Preceded by Sir Robert Carswell	Lord Chief Justice of Northern Ireland; 2004–2009	Succeeded by Sir Declan Morgan
