= Jeremy Baker =

British judge

Sir Jeremy Russell Baker (born 9 February 1958) is a British judge of the Court of Appeal of England and Wales. He is styled Lord Justice Jeremy Baker.

== Career ==
Baker was called to the bar at Middle Temple in 1979. He was appointed an Assistant Recorder in 1996. In 1999, he became a Queen's Counsel. He was appointed a Recorder in 2000 and a circuit judge in 2010. On 25 March 2013, he was appointed a Justice of the High Court, and was assigned to the Queen's Bench Division. He received the customary knighthood in the 2013 Special Honours. Baker was appointed a Judge of the Court of Appeal of England and Wales on 1 October 2024.

== Notable cases ==
- In May 2022, he jailed Imran Ahmad Khan for 18 months after he was convicted of sexual assault of a 15-year-old boy. Khan had been an MP before his conviction.

== See also ==
- Manchester Arena bombing
