= Donald Murray (judge) =

Northern Irish Supreme Judge (1923-2018)

The Right Honourable Sir Donald Murray

Personal details
- Born: 24 January 1923 Belfast, Northern Ireland
- Died: 20 February 2018 (aged 95)
- Spouse: Lady Murray
- Children: 3
- Education: Trinity College Dublin
- Profession: Judge

Sir Donald Bruce Murray PC (24 January 1923 – 20 February 2018) was a Lord Justice of Appeal of the Supreme Court of Northern Ireland.

== Education ==
Born in Belfast, Northern Ireland, he was educated at Belfast Royal Academy and the Queen's University, Belfast as well as Trinity College Dublin. He died in Royal Victoria Hospital, Belfast on 20 February 2018.

== Career ==
Murray was Called to the Bar at Gray's Inn in 1945, the same year he became assistant parliamentary draftsman to the Government of Northern Ireland, a post he held until becoming assistant lecturer in Law at Queen's University in 1951.

In 1953, Murray was called to the Northern Ireland Bar, and twelve years later he was admitted to the province's Inner Bar, becoming a bencher of the Inn of Court in 1971. Between 1972 and 1975 he chaired the General Council of the Bar of Northern Ireland, and from 1976 to 1984 he was deputy chairman of the country's Boundary Commission.

Having been appointed a Justice of the High Court of Northern Ireland in 1975, Murray was made a judge of the Restrictive Practices Court in 1987, receiving a knighthood the following year. In 1989, he was appointed to the province's Court of Appeal, and was admitted to the Privy Council.

For many years Sir Donald was a member of the Board of Governors of Belfast Royal Academy and served as the Warden (Chairman) in 1985.

== Personal life ==
He and Lady Murray, whom he married in 1953, have three grown up children.

Murray retired in 1993, and three years later received the honorary degree of Doctor of Laws from his alma mater Queen's University.
