= Mark Turner (judge) =

British judge (born 1959)

Sir Mark George Turner (born 27 August 1959), styled The Hon. Mr Justice Turner, is a British judge of the High Court of England and Wales.

== Legal career ==
Turner was called to the bar at Gray's Inn in 1981. In 1998, he was appointed a Queen's Counsel. Turner became a Recorder in 2000, and was appointed to sit as a deputy High Court judge. On 28 January 2013, he was appointed a Justice of the High Court, receiving the customary knighthood in the 2013 Special Honours, and was assigned to the Queen's Bench Division. Prior to becoming a member of the judiciary, Turner practised from Crown Office Chambers and was also the head of Dean's Court Chambers.

== Personal life ==
He lives with his family in Hazel Grove. His wife Caroline is a Justice of the Peace and was a former solicitor and they have three daughters who were all educated at Stockport Grammar School.
