= Michael Keehan =

British judge

Sir Michael Joseph Keehan (born 31 March 1960), styled The Hon. Mr Justice Keehan, is a British judge of the High Court of Justice of the Courts of England and Wales.

== Career ==
Keehan was called to the bar at Middle Temple in 1982. He was appointed a Queen's Counsel in 2000. He was appointed a Recorder in 2000 and was approved to sit as a deputy High Court judge. On 13 May 2013, he was appointed a High Court judge, assigned to the Family Division, receiving the customary knighthood in the 2013 Special Honours.
