= Stephen Richards (judge) =

Welsh judge (b.1950)

Sir Stephen Price Richards (born 8 December 1950) is a former Lord Justice of Appeal.

== Biography ==
Stephen Price Richards was born in Wales on 8 December 1950. He was educated at King's College School and St John's College, Oxford (BA, MA).

Having been called to the Bar at Gray's Inn in 1975, Richards was Second Junior Counsel to the Director General of Fair Trading 1987–89 and Standing Counsel 1989–91. He was Junior Counsel to the Crown 1990–91, and First Junior Treasury Counsel 1992–97 (elected as a Bencher of Gray's Inn on taking up the latter appointment).

The First Junior Treasury Counsel is known colloquially as the "Treasury Devil" and represents Her Majesty's Government in the civil courts. Traditionally the First Junior Treasury Counsel is not appointed Queen's Counsel but it is nonetheless one of the most prestigious of legal appointments and almost inevitably leads to appointment as a High Court Judge.

In 1997, Richards was appointed a Judge of the High Court of Justice (Queen's Bench Division), having been appointed a Recorder of the Crown Court the previous year. He was automatically appointed Knight Bachelor. From 2000 until 2003, he served as Presiding Judge for Wales.

On 4 November 2005, Queen Elizabeth II approved his appointment as a Lord Justice of Appeal and a member of the Privy Council. Since becoming a Lord Justice of Appeal he has heard several high-profile appeals, including those concerning Jean Charles de Menezes, an innocent man mistaken for a terrorist and shot dead by the police at Stockwell underground station in 2007 and by Mr and Mrs Ian Gay.

On 1 November 2012, he was appointed Deputy Head of Civil Justice and took up his post on 1 January 2013. Richards retired on 17 February 2016.

In 2018, Richards took up the post of a Justice at the Astana International Financial Centre Court in Astana, Kazakhstan.

== Trial and acquittal ==
In June 2007, Richards was tried at the City of Westminster Magistrates' Court on two charges of indecent exposure on trains in 2006. He said that it was a case of mistaken identity, and was acquitted on both charges.

== Sources and further information ==
- 10 Downing Street's website – accessed Nov 2006
- Her Majesty's Courts Service website – accessed Nov 2006
- Judge cleared of rush-hour flashing (subscription required)
- Frances Gibb, 'Judge and magistrates will hear flashing case', The Times 9 June 2007 (subscription required)
- Debrett's People of Today (12th edn, London, 1999), p. 1648
