= Mark Horner =

Sir Thomas Mark Horner, PC (born 1956) is a Northern Irish barrister and judge. He has been a Lord Justice of Appeal for Northern Ireland since 2022.

Horner was called to the Northern Irish bar in 1979 and became a Queen's Counsel in 1996. He was appointed to the High Court of Northern Ireland in 2012, receiving the customary knighthood.

He was sworn of the Privy Council in 2022.

He is husband to Karin Horner and father to three children, Thomas, Katie and Matthew.
