= Stephen Males =

British judge (born 1955)

The Right Honourable Lord Justice Males
- Royal coat of arms of the United Kingdom

Lord Justice of Appeal
- Incumbent
- Assumed office 2019

Justice of the High Court
- In office 2012–2019

Personal details
- Born: Stephen Martin Males; 24 November 1955 (age 70)
- Education: The Skinners' School
- Alma mater: St John's College, Cambridge
- Occupation: Court of Appeal judge
- Profession: Judge

Sir Stephen Martin Males (born 24 November 1955), styled The Rt. Hon. Lord Justice Males is a British judge of the Court of Appeal of England and Wales.

Males attended The Skinners' School and St John's College, Cambridge, where he was awarded a MA degree in law in 1977.

Males was called to the bar (Middle Temple) in 1978 and became a Queen's Counsel in 1998. He was appointed a Recorder in 1999 and was a Deputy High Court Judge until his promotion to the High Court, assigned to the Queen's Bench Division, on 1 October 2012, receiving the customary knighthood in the 2013 Special Honours. He was promoted to the Court of Appeal in 2019, receiving the customary appointment to the Privy Council of the United Kingdom, allowing him the honorific title "The Right Honourable".

In 2025 he was appointed President of Tribunals for the Church of England under the Clergy Discipline Measure 2003.
