= Eileen Harkin-Jones =

Professor of Composites Engineering

Eileen Harkin-Jones OBE FREng FIMechE FIChemE
- Born: Eileen M. A. Harkin-Jones
- Education: University College Dublin (BEng); Queen's University Belfast (PhD)
- Scientific career
- Fields: Polymers; Polycaprolactone; Nanocomposites; Composite materials
- Workplaces: Queen's University Belfast; Ulster University
- Thesis: Rotational moulding of reactive plastics (1992)
- Website: ulster.ac.uk/staff/e-harkin-jones

Eileen M. A. Harkin-Jones is the Bombardier Aerospace-Royal Academy of Engineering professor of composites engineering at the Ulster University.

== Education ==
Harkin-Jones studied mechanical engineering at University College Dublin, and received first class honours in 1983. She completed her PhD at Queen's University Belfast working on materials for rotational moulding in 1992.

== Research and career ==
Harkin-Jones was appointed a lecturer at Queen's in 1993. In 1999 Harkin-Jones became the first woman to be appointed an engineering professor in Ireland. Her research is on polymer processing and the development of materials. In 2015, she was appointed the Bombardier-Royal Academy of Engineering professor of composite engineering at Ulster University. At Ulster University she focuses on aerospace composites and sustainable plastic manufacture. Using injection moulding, thermoforming and additive manufacture, Harkin-Jones is exploring advanced thermoplastic composite materials for medical devices and aerospace. She has published over 200 peer reviewed papers, and secured funding over £12 million.

She is a member of the Royal Academy of Engineering Higher Education committee and Deputy Chair of the Northern Ireland Higher Education Authority. She is campaigning for gender equality in science, technology, engineering, and mathematics (STEM) at a national level. She is a member of the All-Party Parliamentary Group for Manufacturing.

=== Awards and honours ===
In 2017, she was appointed a Fellow of the Irish Academy of Engineering. She was elected a Fellow of the Royal Academy of Engineering (FREng) in 2011. In 2013, she was appointed Order of the British Empire (OBE) for services to higher education.
