= John MacDermott (judge) =

Northern Irish barrister and judge (1927–2022)

Sir John Clarke MacDermott, PC (9 May 1927 – 13 December 2022) was a Northern Ireland barrister and judge.

== Biography ==
MacDermott was born on 9 May 1927, as the son of the judge John MacDermott, Baron MacDermott and Louise Palmer Johnston, oldest daughter of the Rev. J. C. Johnston, DD. He was educated at Campbell College, Belfast, Trinity Hall, Cambridge (BA), and Queen's University Belfast.

MacDermott was called to English Bar by the Inner Temple and the Bar of Northern Ireland in 1949 and became a Northern Irish Queen's Counsel in 1964. He was appointed a Justice of the High Court of Northern Ireland in 1973. In 1987, he was made a Lord Justice of Appeal, and was knighted and sworn of the Privy Council. He retired from the bench in 1998.

McDermott died on 13 December 2022, at the age of 95.

== Sources ==
- Judge's retiring breaks long link, irishtimes.com. Accessed 25 January 2023.
