= Malachy Higgins =

Sir Malachy Joseph Higgins KC (born 30 October 1944) is a retired Northern Ireland Lord Justice of Appeal.

== Education ==
He was educated at St MacNissi's College, Garron Tower; Queen's University Belfast (LLB) and Middle Temple (BL).

== Legal background ==
- Called to the Northern Ireland Bar, 1969 (Bencher, 1993)
- Called to the Irish Bar, 1978
- Named QC (Northern Ireland), 1985
- Served as County Court Judge, 1988–1993
- Served as Recorder of Londonderry, 1990 to 1993
- Served as County Court Judge for County Armagh, 1993.
- Judge in Residence, QUB, 1999–present

== Privy Council ==
On 25 January 2007, Higgins was "sworn of Her Majesty’s most honourable Privy Council on his appointment as a Lord Justice of Appeal in Northern Ireland."

== Queen's University Belfast ==
Sir Malachy Higgins was Chairman of the Queen's University Belfast's Board of Visitors from 2008 to 2013.
