= Robert Jay =

British judge

The Honourable Mr Justice Jay
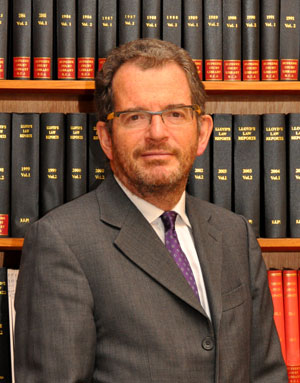
- Jay in 2015

Justice of the High Court
- Incumbent
- Assumed office 4 June 2013
- Monarchs: Elizabeth II; Charles III

Personal details
- Born: 20 September 1959 (age 67) United Kingdom
- Education: New College, Oxford

Sir Robert Maurice Jay (born 20 September 1959), styled The Hon. Mr Justice Jay, is a judge of the High Court of Justice of the Courts of England and Wales. He was counsel to the Leveson Inquiry.

== Early life ==
Jay was born on 20 September 1959. His parents were Professor Barrie Samuel Jay, a consultant surgeon at Moorfields Eye Hospital, and Marcelle Ruby Jay, née Byre, a geneticist.

He was educated at King's College School, a private fee paying school for boys in Wimbledon in South West London. He won an Open Scholarship to New College, Oxford, where he obtained a first in jurisprudence. He was a contemporary of the later actor and film star Hugh Grant. He undertook pupillage with Simon D. Brown (later Baron Brown of Eaton-Under-Heywood).

== Life and career ==
Jay was called to the Bar at Middle Temple in 1981. From 1989 to 1998 he was one of the Junior Counsel to the Crown (Common Law). He was appointed Queen's Counsel in 1998. He was a recorder from 2000 to 2013 and was approved to sit as a deputy High Court judge. He was counsel to the Leveson Inquiry into phone-hacking and media ethics, when he came to public attention due to televising and other reporting. On 4 June 2013, he was appointed a High Court judge, receiving the customary knighthood in the 2013 Special Honours, and was assigned to the Queen's Bench Division.

During the Leveson Inquiry, Jay became publicly known for his use of rarely used words – such as condign, pellucidly and adumbrate – for highlighting apparent discrepancies in witnesses' emailed descriptions of events, and possible collusion between witnesses, as "light refracted through two intermediate prisms", and for asides such as "I’m beginning to sound irritated, but I am". At one point, he was seen to mouth to colleagues: "This is such fun".

In 2014 he granted an injunction for harassment against a woman who alleged she was assaulted by convicted rapist Russell Brand on behalf of Brand and his then partner Jemima Goldsmith. This injunction prevented the woman from speaking to the police about the assault and also prevented her from discussing the incident with doctors or therapists, other than exceptions listed in the injunction who were treating her at the time injunction.

In April 2019 Jay was the judge in the fraud trial of four former Barclays bankers (Varley and others) over the bank's Middle Easter fundraising during the 2008 financial crisis. They were accused of paying millions of pounds in secret fees. After months of hearings in the Crown Court at Southwark, Jay made a terminating ruling, discharging the jury.

In May 2019, the Court of Appeal adopted his own terminology, describing one of Jay's own judgments as being hardly "pellucid". As well as levelling this mocking criticism at his legal writing, the Court of Appeal allowed the appeal on every ground raised, including the ground that Jay had been so overbearing, rude, and bullying to the claimant (whose first language was not English but Polish, and who was acting without legal help), that the trial had been unfair. In June 2020, the UK Supreme Court went further and found that Jay had "harassed and intimidated [the claimant] in ways which surely would never have occurred if the claimant had been represented".

Jay is also hearing cases as member of the Special Immigration Appeals Commission.

== Personal life ==
Jay is interested in history, art, classical music (particularly opera, and Wagner's Ring Cycle), and is also keen on chess, cookery, golf, and cycling.

Jay and his wife Deborah, who is an author, have a daughter.
