= Ben Stephens, Lord Stephens of Creevyloughgare =

Northern Ireland judge (born 1954)

The Right Honourable Lord Stephens of Creevyloughgare
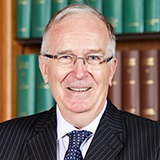

Justice of the Supreme Court of the United Kingdom
- Incumbent
- Assumed office 1 October 2020
- Nominated by: Robert Buckland
- Appointed by: Elizabeth II
- Preceded by: The Lord Kerr of Tonaghmore

Personal details
- Born: 28 December 1954 (age 71)
- Spouse: Nicola Gladys Skrine (m. 1982)
- Education: University of Manchester

William Benjamin Synge Stephens, Lord Stephens of Creevyloughgare, PC (born 28 December 1954) is a British judge who serves as a Justice of the United Kingdom Supreme Court and previously served as a Lord Justice of Appeal on the Northern Ireland Court of Appeal.

== Early life and education ==
He was educated at independent Swanbourne House School and Campbell College. He attended the University of Manchester and graduated with a first-class LLB.

== Career ==
In 1977 he was called to the Bar of Northern Ireland. He was called to the Bar of England and Wales in 1978, and the Bar of Ireland in 1996. He was appointed a QC in 1996. He was appointed a High Court judge in Northern Ireland in 2007, and as such he received the customary knighthood. He was appointed to the Court of Appeal in Northern Ireland in September 2017. As an Appeal Court Judge he was sworn in as a Member of the Privy Council of the United Kingdom in 2017.

On the 1 October 2020 he become a Justice of the United Kingdom Supreme Court, following the retirement of Lord Kerr of Tonaghmore. On assuming office, he took the judicial courtesy title of Lord Stephens of Creevyloughgare. In 2022, he and Lord Hamblen of Kersey gave the ruling in ZXC v Bloomberg that individuals investigated by police have a reasonable expectation of privacy not to be named in the media unless charged with an offence.

== Personal life ==
He married Nicola Gladys Skrine in 1982, with whom he has one son and one daughter.
