= Siobhan Keegan =

Northern Irish judge (born 1971)

The Right Honourable Dame Siobhan Keegan DBE KC HonFBA
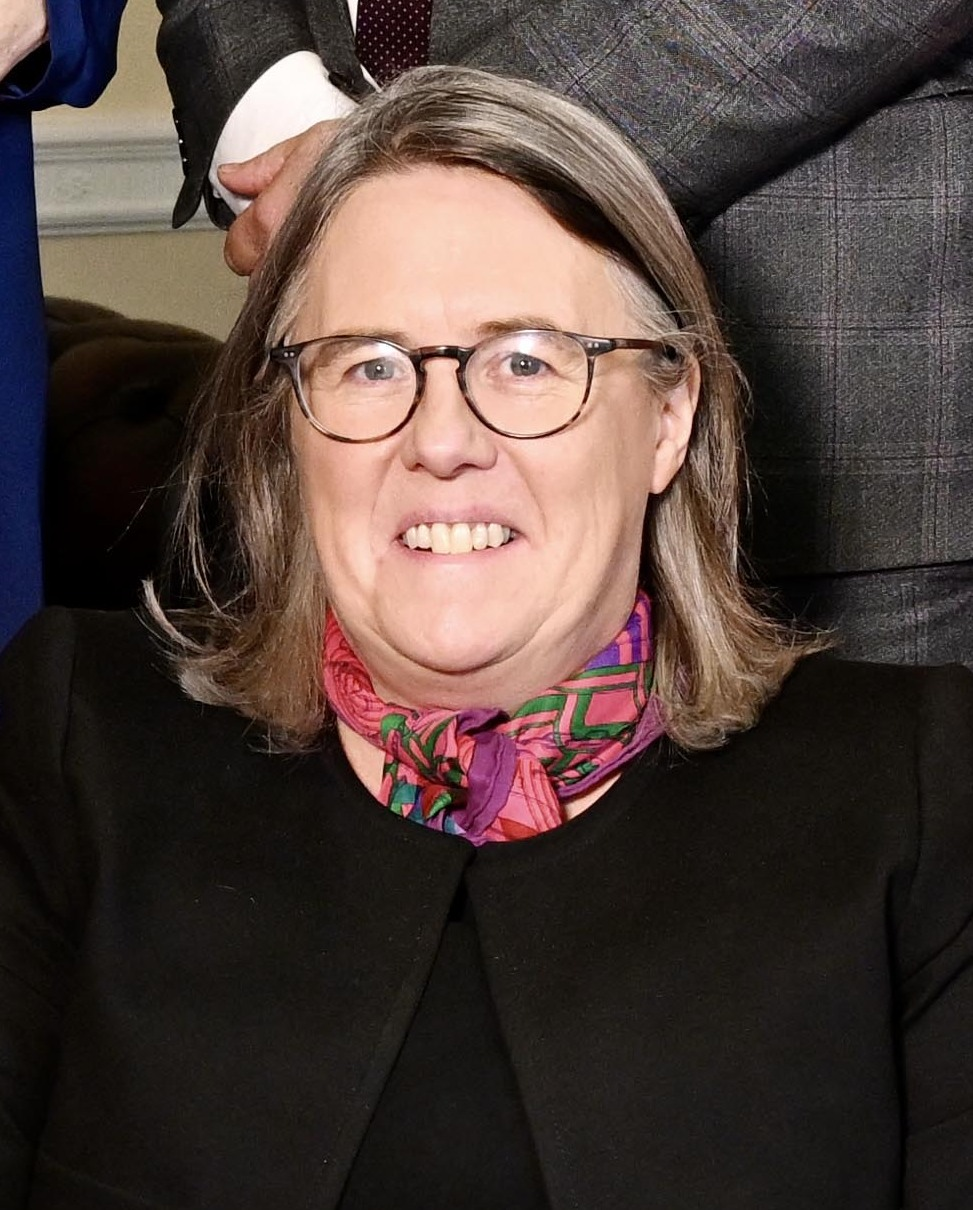
- Keegan in 2024

Lady Chief Justice of Northern Ireland
- Incumbent
- Assumed office 2 September 2021
- Nominated by: Boris Johnson
- Appointed by: Elizabeth II
- Preceded by: Sir Declan Morgan

Justice of the High Court of Northern Ireland
- In office 23 October 2015 – 2 September 2021

Personal details
- Born: June 6, 1971 (age 55)
- Citizenship: United Kingdom
- Education: Sacred Heart Grammar School; Queen's University Belfast
- Occupation: Jurist
- Profession: Law

Dame Siobhan Roisin Keegan DBE KC HonFBA (born 6 June 1971) is a Northern Irish judge who has been Lady Chief Justice of Northern Ireland since 2021. She is the first woman to hold the senior judicial office in any part of the United Kingdom. She was formerly a judge of the High Court of Northern Ireland from October 2015 until her appointment as Lord Chief Justice, prior to which she practised as a barrister specialising in family law.

== Early life ==
Keegan was educated at St. Clare's Primary School and Sacred Heart Grammar School, Newry, County Down, Northern Ireland.

She studied law at Queen's University Belfast and graduated with a Bachelor of Laws (LLB) degree in July 1993. After further study, she was called to the Bar of Northern Ireland in September 1994.

== Legal career ==
Keegan became a barrister when she was called to the Bar of Northern Ireland in September 1994. She specialised in family law but has also had experience in criminal law and judicial review.

She was made a Queen's Counsel (QC) in June 2006. Between 2011 and 2013, she served as Chair of the Family Bar Association. In 2014, she was elected Vice Chair of the Bar Council of Northern Ireland.

For each of the financial years from 2013 to 2015, Keegan was the fourth-highest-earning barrister in Northern Ireland in terms of legal aid, having received £504,177 in 2012/2013, £513,405 in 2013/2014, and £427,632 in 2014/2015.

On 23 October 2015, Keegan was appointed a judge of the High Court of Justice in Northern Ireland. She was sworn into office by Sir Declan Morgan, the Lord Chief Justice of Northern Ireland, at the same time as Denise McBride. This made Keegan and McBride jointly the first female high court judges of Northern Ireland. On 23 November, she was appointed a Dame Commander of the Order of the British Empire (DBE).

On 16 June 2021, Keegan was nominated to be Northern Ireland's first female Lord Chief Justice. Keegan chose to be styled Lady Chief Justice and was sworn-in on 2 September 2021. On 29 September, Keegan was appointed to the Privy Council. On 15 June 2022, Keegan LCJ delivered the lead judgment in the case of In the matter of H-W (Children)[2022] UKSC 17.Re H-W Children [2022] UKSC 17

She was elected an Honorary Fellow of the British Academy (Hon FBA) in 2026.
