= Robert Carswell, Baron Carswell =

British judge (1934–2023)

The Right Honourable The Lord Carswell PC
- Carswell in 2018

Lord of Appeal in Ordinary
- In office 12 September 2004 – 30 June 2009
- Monarch: Elizabeth II
- Preceded by: Brian Hutton
- Succeeded by: Sir Brian Kerr

Member of the House of Lords
- Lord Temporal
- Lord of Appeal in Ordinary; 12 January 2004 – 29 October 2019

Lord Chief Justice of Northern Ireland
- In office 1997–2004
- Preceded by: Sir Brian Hutton
- Succeeded by: Sir Brian Kerr

Lord Justice of Appeal Supreme Court of Judicature Northern Ireland
- In office 1992–1997

High Court of Justice Northern Ireland
- In office 1984–1992

Senior Crown Counsel Northern Ireland
- In office 1979–1984

Personal details
- Born: Robert Douglas Carswell; 28 June 1934
- Died: 4 May 2023 (aged 88)
- Spouse: Romayne Ferris (1961–2023)
- Children: Catherine; Patricia
- Education: Pembroke College, Oxford; University of Chicago Law School
- Occupation: Judge
- Profession: Barrister

Robert Douglas Carswell, Baron Carswell, PC KC, (28 June 1934 – 4 May 2023) was a British barrister and judge who served as Lord Chief Justice of Northern Ireland and a Lord of Appeal in Ordinary.

== Early life and education ==
The son of Alan Carswell and his wife Nance Corlett, Robert Carswell was educated at the Royal Belfast Academical Institution and Pembroke College, Oxford where he received a BA in Classics and Law in 1956 (later converted to an MA). Two years later he graduated from the University of Chicago Law School with a Juris Doctor.

== Legal career ==
Carswell was called to the bar in 1957 and took silk in 1971.

Carswell was Counsel to the Attorney General for Northern Ireland in the years 1969 and 1971, and Senior Crown Counsel in Northern Ireland from 1979 to 1984. In 1984, he became Judge of the High Court of Justice Northern Ireland, a post he held until 1992. He was Lord Justice of Appeal at the Supreme Court of Judicature in Northern Ireland from 1992 to 1997 and further Lord Chief Justice of Northern Ireland from 1997 to 2004. Lord Carswell was made a Queen's Counsel in 1971.

Carswell was knighted in 1988 and became a Privy Counsellor in 1993. He was appointed a Lord of Appeal in Ordinary as Baron Carswell, of Killeen in the County of Down on 12 January 2004. He sat in the House of Lords as a crossbencher until his retirement from the membership of the House on 29 October 2019.

From 2009 to 2010, Lord Carswell chaired an inquiry into the roles of Jersey's Crown Officers (the Bailiff, Deputy Bailiff, Attorney General and Solicitor General), presenting a report recommending reforms to the States of Jersey on 6 December 2010.

== Marriage and children ==
Carswell married Romayne Winifred Ferris in 1961; they had two daughters. Lady Carswell was appointed Lord Lieutenant of Belfast in 2000.

== Death ==
Lord Carswell died on 4 May 2023 at the age of 88.

== See also ==
- List of Northern Ireland Members of the House of Lords

Legal offices
Preceded by Brian Hutton	Lord Chief Justice of Northern Ireland; 1997–2004	Succeeded by Brian Kerr
