= John Sheil =

Northern Irish judge

The Right Honourable Sir John Sheil

Lord Justice of Appeal
- In office September 2004 – December 2006
- Monarch: Elizabeth II

Personal details
- Born: 19 June 1938 (age 88)
- Education: Trinity College Dublin
- Occupation: Judge
- Profession: Law

Sir John Joseph Sheil (born 19 June 1938) is a retired Northern Irish judge. He was a High Court Judge of Northern Ireland from 1989 to 2004, and a Lord Justice of Appeal of Northern Ireland from 2004 to 2007.

== Early life and education ==
Sheil was born on 19 June 1938. He was educated at Clongowes Wood College, an all-boys voluntary secondary school in County Kildare, Ireland where his twin brother, Fr. Michael Sheil SJ, is currently rector. He then studied at Queen's University Belfast and Trinity College Dublin.

== Career ==
In 1964, Sheil was called to the bar of Northern Ireland and began practising as a barrister. He was made a Queen's Counsel (QC) in 1975. #he was Chairman of the Mental Health Review Tribunal from 1985 to 1987, and was a member of the Fair Employment Appeals Board from 1986 to 1989.

In 1989, Sheil was made a High Court Judge of Northern Ireland. He served as a Lord Justice of Appeal in Northern Ireland from September 2004 to 31 December 2006. He retired from the judiciary at the end of 2006.

Since 1 September 2010, Sheil has been a Surveillance Commissioner. As this position has a three-year term, he was reappointed on 1 September 2013, and again on 1 September 2016.

== Honours ==
In 1989, Sheil was knighted as a Knight Bachelor. On 5 Nov 1996, he was elected an Honorary Bencher of Gray's Inn. On 16 May 2005, he was elected an Honorary Bencher of Middle Temple. In 2005, he was appointed a Privy Counsellor.
