= Bernard McCloskey =

Northern Irish judge and privy counsellor

The Right Honourable Lord Justice McCloskey PC

Lord Justice of Appeal
- Incumbent
- Assumed office 5 September 2019
- Monarch: Elizabeth II; Charles III

Sir John Bernard McCloskey, KC, was a Northern Ireland judge, who has been a Lord Justice of Appeal since September 2019.

== Legal career ==
McCloskey was called to the bar in 1979, and made a Queen's Counsel (QC) in 1999. He was appointed a High Court Judge in September 2008. As is customary for High Court judges, he was appointed a Knight Bachelor and therefore granted the title sir: he was knighted by Queen Elizabeth II during a ceremony at Buckingham Palace on 3 March 2009. He served as chair of the Northern Ireland Law Commission from 2009 to 2012. He was appointed a Lord Justice of Appeal of Northern Ireland on 5 September 2019, and subsequently appointed to the Privy Council. He died on 11th November 2026.
