= Lord Chief Justice of Northern Ireland =

Head of the judiciary of Northern Ireland

Lady Chief Justice of Northern Ireland
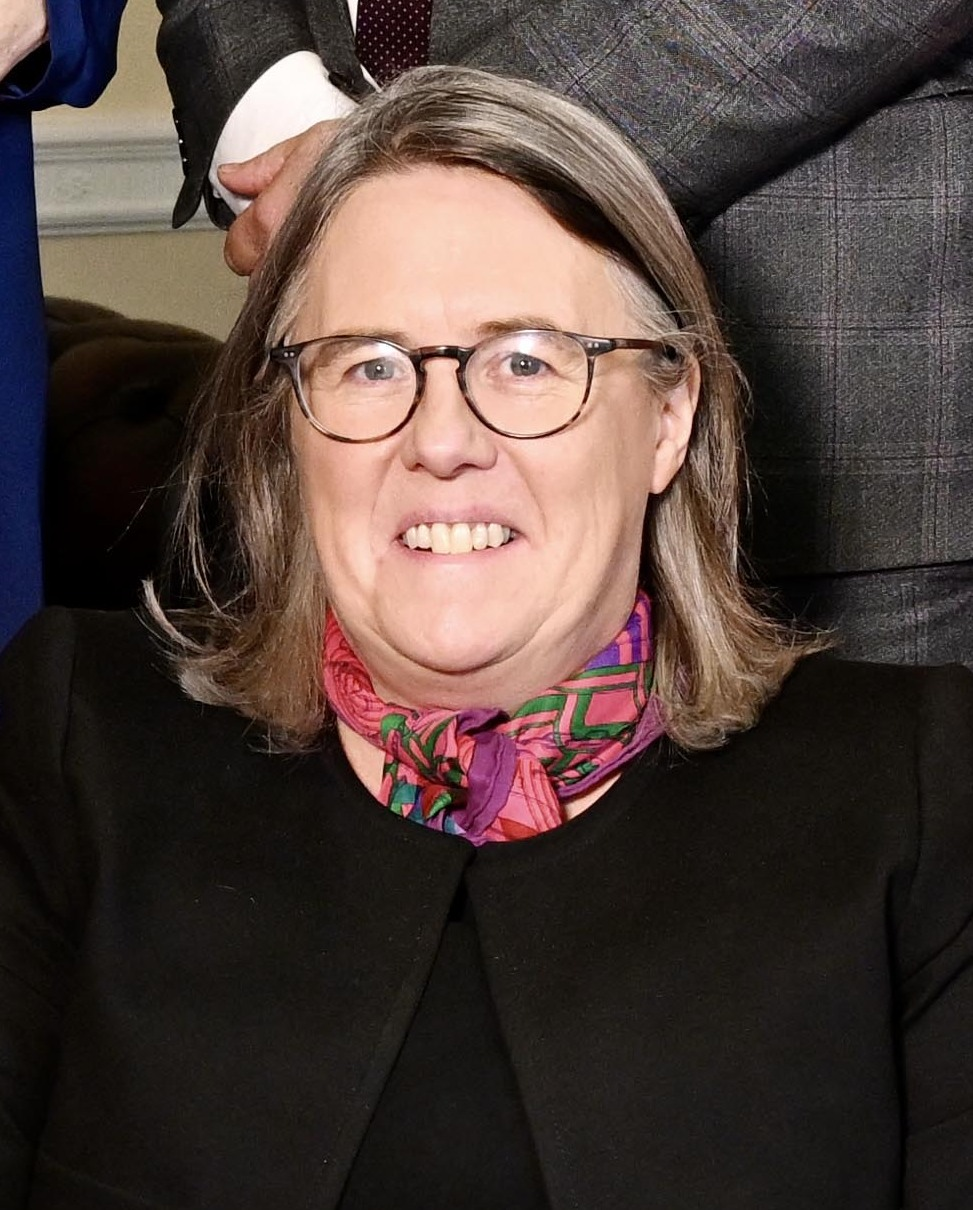
- Incumbent; Dame Siobhan Keegan since 2 September 2021
- Judiciary of Northern Ireland
- Style: The Right Honourable
- Nominator: Prime Minister (in consultation with the Lord Chief Justice and the Northern Ireland Judicial Appointments Commission)
- Appointer: The Monarch
- Term length: Mandatory retirement at 75
- Constituting instrument: Judicature (Northern Ireland) Act 1978
- Precursor: Lord Chief Justice of Ireland
- Inaugural holder: Sir Denis Henry, Bt
- Formation: 1922
- Salary: £238,868
- Website: www.judiciaryni.uk

The Lord or Lady Chief Justice of Northern Ireland (Note: The correct legal name of the post remains Lord Chief Justice even when the holder is a woman, although the holder may choose to be styled as Lady Chief Justice.) is the head of the judiciary of Northern Ireland and the president of the courts of Northern Ireland. The position was established with the creation of Northern Ireland in 1922, and was preceded by the position of Lord Chief Justice of Ireland prior to the partition of Ireland. The equivalent office in England and Wales is the Lord Chief Justice of England and Wales, and in Scotland it is the Lord President of the Court of Session. The current Lady Chief Justice is Dame Siobhan Keegan, the first woman to hold the office.

== Background ==
The office of Lord Chief Justice was originally established as one of two successor offices of the position of Lord Chief Justice of Ireland, underneath the Lord Chancellor of Ireland, who was president of the courts. The Lord Chief Justice replaced the Lord Chancellor as president of the courts by statute in 1978.

== Role and responsibilities ==
The Lord Chief Justice of Northern Ireland holds the office of president of the courts of Northern Ireland and is head of the judiciary of Northern Ireland.The Lord Chief Justice is responsible for representing the views of the judiciary of Northern Ireland to government, for the maintenance of appropriate arrangements for the welfare, training and guidance of the judiciary of Northern Ireland, and for the maintenance of appropriate arrangements for the deployment of the judiciary of Northern Ireland and the allocation of work within the courts.The Lord Chief Justice is president of the Court of Appeal, the High Court, the Crown Court, the county courts and the magistrates' courts of Northern Ireland. The Lord Chief Justice is entitled to sit on any of those courts, but routinely sits on the Court of Appeal.

== List of lord chief justices of Northern Ireland ==
- Sir Denis Henry, 1st Baronet, (1922–1925)
- Sir William Moore, 1st Baronet (1925–1937)
- Sir James Andrews, 1st Baronet (1937–1951)
- John MacDermott, Baron MacDermott (1951–1971)
- Robert Lynd Erskine Lowry (1971–1989)
- Brian Hutton, Baron Hutton (1989–1997)
- Robert Carswell, Baron Carswell (1997–2004)
- Sir Brian Kerr (2004–2009)
- Sir Declan Morgan (2009–2021)
- Dame Siobhan Keegan (2021–)

== See also ==
- Lord Chief Justice of Ireland
- Lord Chief Justice of Southern Ireland
- Chief Justice of Ireland
- List of lords justices of appeal of Northern Ireland
- List of High Court judges of Northern Ireland

== Sources ==
- N.C. Fleming and Alan O'Day, The Longman Handbook of Modern Irish History since 1800, N.C. Fleming and Alan O'Day, p. 420; ISBN 0-582-08102-5
