= Patrick Coghlin =

Sir Patrick Coghlin, PC (born 7 November 1945), is a retired member of the Court of Appeal of Northern Ireland.

Educated at Christ's College, Cambridge, Coghlin was called to the Bar in Northern Ireland in 1970; England and Wales (Gray's Inn) in 1975; and the Republic of Ireland and New South Wales, Australia, in 1993. He became Junior Crown Counsel in 1983, serving until 1985, when he was made a Queen's Counsel. He served as a deputy County Court judge from 1983 to 1994, and as Senior Crown Counsel for Northern Ireland 1993–97. He was appointed a judge of the High Court of Justice of Northern Ireland on 7 April 1997, receiving the customary knighthood.

He was promoted to be a Lord Justice of Appeal of Northern Ireland on 5 September 2008. That year, he was also appointed to a five-year term as a judicial member of the Northern Ireland Judicial Appointments Commission. In consequence of his promotion, he was appointed to the Privy Council in 2009. He retired in 2015.

Coghlin was appointed President of the Lands Tribunal for Northern Ireland in 1999, and has been a member of the Council of the Association of European Competition Law Judges since 2002. He was elected an honorary bencher of Gray's Inn in 2000.

He served in the following roles:

- Vice-chairman Mental Health Review Tribunal for Northern Ireland, 1986–1997
- Member of Northern Ireland's Law Reform Advisory Committee, 1989–1993
- Vice-President of the Value Added Tax Tribunal for Northern Ireland, 1990–1993
- Chairman of the Executive Council of the Bar of Northern Ireland, 1991–1993
- Deputy Chair of the Boundary Commission for Northern Ireland, 1999–2002
