= Paul Girvan (judge) =

Sir Frederick Paul Girvan PC (born 20 October 1948) is a retired Northern Irish judge. He was educated at Larne Grammar School, Belfast Royal Academy, Clare College, Cambridge (BA) and Queen's University, Belfast.

He was knighted on his appointment as a Justice of the High Court of Northern Ireland, 1995. Sworn of Her Majesty's Most Honourable Privy Council on 25 January 2007 on his appointment as a Lord Justice of Appeal of the Court of Judicature of Northern Ireland.

In July 2006 he delivered a judgment in Downes (Re), Application for Judicial Review, criticising the appointment of Mrs Bertha McDougall as Interim Victims Commissioner. The judgment was criticised by the former Secretary for State for Northern Ireland, Peter Hain, in his memoir Outside In. In March 2012 the Attorney-General of Northern Ireland began proceedings against Hain and the publishers alleging contempt of court, alleging contempt of court, although these were subsequently dropped.

He retired in 2015.

== Background ==
- Called to the Bar: NI, 1971
- Junior Crown Counsel, NI, 1979–1982
- Queen's Counsel (NI), 1982
- Chancellor, Diocese of Armagh (Church of Ireland), 1999–present
- Chairman: Council of Law Reporting for NI, 1994–2001
- Law Reform Advisory Committee for NI, 1997–2004 (Member since 1994)
- Hon. Bencher, Gray's Inn, 1999.
