= Brian Hutton, Baron Hutton =

UK law lord and barrister (1931–2020)

The Right Honourable The Lord Hutton PC

Lord Chief Justice of Northern Ireland
- In office 1989–1997
- Appointed by: Elizabeth II
- Preceded by: Lord Lowry
- Succeeded by: Lord Carswell

Member of the House of Lords
- Lord Temporal
- Lord of Appeal in Ordinary; 6 January 1997 – 23 April 2018

Lord of Appeal in Ordinary
- In office 6 January 1997 – 11 September 2004
- Appointed by: Elizabeth II
- Preceded by: The Lord Woolf
- Succeeded by: Lord Carswell

Personal details
- Born: James Brian Edward Hutton; 29 June 1931 Belfast, United Kingdom
- Died: 14 July 2020 (aged 89)
- Spouses: Mary Murland (m. 1975; died 2000) Lindy Nickols (m. 2001)
- Children: 5 (3 stepchildren)
- Education: Balliol College, Oxford

James Brian Edward Hutton, Baron Hutton, PC (29 June 1931 – 14 July 2020) was a British Lord Chief Justice of Northern Ireland and Lord of Appeal in Ordinary.

== Background ==
Hutton was born in Belfast in 1931, the son of a railways executive. He won a scholarship to Shrewsbury School and Balliol College, Oxford (BA jurisprudence, 1953) before returning to Belfast to become a barrister (after study at Queen's University Belfast), being called to the Bar of Northern Ireland in 1954. He began working as junior counsel to the Attorney General for Northern Ireland in 1969.

He became a Queen's Counsel in 1970. From 1979 to 1989, he was (as Sir Brian Hutton) a High Court judge. In 1989, he became Lord Chief Justice of Northern Ireland, becoming a member of the Privy Council, before moving to England to become a Lord of Appeal in Ordinary 6 January 1997. He was consequently granted a life peerage as Baron Hutton, of Bresagh in the County of Down.

== Judge ==
On 30 March 1994, as Lord Chief Justice of Northern Ireland, he dismissed Private Lee Clegg's appeal against his controversial murder conviction. On 21 March 2002 Lord Hutton was one of four Law Lords to reject David Shayler's application to use a "public interest" defence as defined in section 1 of the Official Secrets Act 1989 at his trial.

Lord Hutton represented the Ministry of Defence at the inquest into the killing of 14 civil rights marchers on Bloody Sunday. Later, he publicly reprimanded Major Hubert O'Neil, the coroner presiding over the inquest, when O'Neil accused the soldiers who opened fire during the incident of murder, as this contradicted the findings of the Widgery Tribunal.

Hutton also came to public attention in 1999 during the extradition proceedings of former Chilean dictator General Augusto Pinochet. Pinochet had been arrested in London on torture allegations by request of a Spanish judge. Five Law Lords, the UK's highest court, decided by a 3–2 majority that Pinochet was to be extradited to Spain. The verdict was then overturned by a panel of seven Law Lords, including Lord Hutton on the grounds that Lord Hoffmann, one of the five Law Lords, had links to human rights group Amnesty International which had campaigned for Pinochet's extradition.

In 1978, he defended the UK at the European Court of Human Rights (ECHR) in the case of Ireland v United Kingdom, when the ECHR decided that the five techniques used in Northern Ireland were "inhuman and degrading" and breached the European Convention on Human Rights, but did not amount to torture. The ECHR also found that the practice of internment in Northern Ireland had not breached the convention. He sentenced 10 men to 1,001 years in prison on the word of "supergrass" informer Robert Quigley, who was granted immunity in 1984.

Lord Hutton was appointed by Tony Blair's government to chair the inquiry on the circumstances surrounding the death of scientist David Kelly. The inquiry commenced on 11 August 2003. Many observers were surprised when he delivered his report on 28 January 2004 and cleared the British government in large part. His criticism of the BBC was regarded by some as unduly harsh; one critic commented that he had given the "benefit of judgement to virtually everyone in the government and no-one in the BBC.". In response to the verdict, the front page of The Independent newspaper consisted of one word, "Whitewash?"

Peter Oborne wrote in The Spectator in January 2004: "Legal opinion in Northern Ireland, where Lord Hutton practised for most of his career, emphasises the caution of his judgments. He is said to have been habitually chary of making precedents. But few people seriously doubt Hutton's fairness or independence. Though [he is] a dour Presbyterian, there were spectacular acquittals of some very grisly IRA terrorist suspects when he was a judge in the Diplock era."

Lord Hutton retired as a Law Lord on 11 January 2004. He remained a member of the House of Lords until retiring under the House of Lords Reform Act 2014 on 23 April 2018.

He died on 14 July 2020 at the age of 88.

== Styles ==
- Mr James Brian Edward Hutton (1932–1969)
- Mr James Brian Edward Hutton, QC (1970–1978)
- Sir James Brian Edward Hutton (1979–1989)
- The Rt. Hon. Sir James Brian Edward Hutton (1989–1997)
- The Rt. Hon. Lord Hutton, PC (1997–2020)

== See also ==
- Judicial functions of the House of Lords
- List of jurists
- List of current members of the British Privy Council
- List of Northern Ireland Members of the House of Lords
- List of Northern Ireland members of the Privy Council

Legal offices
Preceded by Robert Lowry	Lord Chief Justice of Northern Ireland; 1988–1997	Succeeded by Robert Carswell
