= Paul Maguire (judge) =

Barrister and politician, later judge, from Northern Ireland

Sir Paul Maguire PC

Member of the Northern Ireland Assembly for North Belfast
- In office 20 October 1982 – 1986

Personal details
- Born: 10 November 1952; Belfast, Northern Ireland
- Political party: Alliance Party

Sir Paul Richard Maguire PC (born 10 November 1952), styled The Rt. Hon. Lord. Justice Maguire, was an Appeal Court judge in Northern Ireland until his retirement in 2022. Prior to that he was a barrister and a politician.

== Background ==
Maguire was called to the Bar in 1978 and became Queen's Counsel in 2006. He lectured at Queen's University Belfast, and served as a part-time Chairman of the Employment Tribunals.

Maguire unsuccessfully stood for election to Belfast City Council for the Alliance Party of Northern Ireland in 1981. He was then elected at the 1982 Northern Ireland Assembly election for North Belfast.

He stood for the Alliance party in the equivalent Westminster constituency of North Belfast at the 1983 general election, taking 9.1% of the vote, then again at the Belfast North by-election in 1986, when he increased his vote share to 16.7%.

In the mid-1980s, Maguire left politics and focused on his legal career, rising to become Queen's Counsel in 2006, and representing the Government in a number of high-profile cases.

In 2010, he was appointed to head an inquiry into Peter Robinson's knowledge of his wife's improper financial affairs. He was a member of the human rights advisory committee of the Bar Council.

In 2012, he was named a judge of the High Court of Northern Ireland. At his High Court swearing in ceremony in May 2012 the Lord Chief Justice, Sir Declan Morgan, said that Mr. Justice Maguire had a distinguished career at the Bar and as senior Crown Counsel and that he would be " an invaluable and honourable addition to our High Court bench" . He was knighted in the 2013 Special Honours.

In January 2021, he was elevated to the Court of Appeal, which is the highest court in Northern Ireland.

Northern Ireland Assembly (1982)
New assembly	MPA for North Belfast; 1982–1986	Assembly abolished
