= Declan Morgan =

Northern Irish judge

The Right Honourable Sir Declan Morgan PC
- Royal coat of arms of the United Kingdom

Lord Chief Justice of Northern Ireland
- In office 3 July 2009 – 30 June 2021
- Nominated by: Gordon Brown
- Appointed by: Elizabeth II
- Preceded by: Sir Brian Kerr
- Succeeded by: Dame Siobhan Keegan

Personal details
- Born: Charles Declan Morgan; January 14, 1951 (age 75) Derry, Northern Ireland
- Spouse: Adrienne Morgan
- Children: 3
- Education: Peterhouse, Cambridge; Queen's University, Belfast
- Profession: Barrister

Sir Charles Declan Morgan (born 14 January 1951) is a judge from Northern Ireland. He was Lord Chief Justice of Northern Ireland from 2009 to 2021 and was appointed to the supplementary panel of the Supreme Court in September 2021.

== Early life ==
Morgan was born in 1951 and was educated at St Columb's College in Derry. He then was educated at Peterhouse, Cambridge, and Queen's University, Belfast. He was called to the Bar of Northern Ireland in 1976 and became a Queen's Counsel in 1994. Between 2002 and 2004, he was Senior Crown Counsel for Northern Ireland. He also served for a time as Judge-In-Residence at the School of Law of Queen's University Belfast.

== Judicial career ==
In 2004, Morgan was appointed a judge of the High Court and knighted. He became Chairman of the Law Reform Advisory Committee for Northern Ireland that same year and in 2007 was appointed Chairman of the Northern Ireland Law Commission. In 2007, he was appointed to the Family Division of the Court, and in 2008 moved to hearing cases for judicial review.

On 18 June 2009, it was announced that Mr Justice Morgan would succeed Sir Brian Kerr as Lord Chief Justice following the latter's appointment as a Lord of Appeal in Ordinary. He was sworn into office on 3 July 2009.

On 10 February 2010, Morgan was sworn of Her Majesty's Most Honourable Privy Council. Morgan retired as lord chief justice in June 2021. He was appointed to the supplementary panel of the Supreme Court, on which he had served while lord chief justice, in September 2021.

In May 2024, Morgan became chief commissioner of the Independent Commission for Reconciliation and Information Recovery (ICRIR).

== Personal life ==
Sir Declan is married with three children.

Legal offices
Preceded by Sir Brian Kerr	Lord Chief Justice of Northern Ireland; 2009–2021	Succeeded by Dame Siobhan Keegan, DBE
