= Seamus Treacy =

Northern Irish judge

Sir Seamus Treacy is a Lord Justice of Appeal in the Northern Ireland Court of Appeal.

== Education ==
He studied at Queen's University, Belfast and was called to the bar in 1979.

== Career ==
He initially practised as a barrister after passing the bar.

Two decades later, in 1999, he was appointed Queen's Counsel, and the following year was called to the Bar Council of Ireland.

In 2007, he was made a High Court Judge.

In 2017 he was sworn in as a Lord Justice of Appeal in the Northern Ireland Court of Appeal.

Along with Barry MacDonald, Treacy challenged the ruling that barristers must swear allegiance to the Queen, arguing successfully that lawyers who held nationalist views should be exempt from this requirement.

== Personal life ==
In 2009, following the discovery of a pipe bomb nearby, Treacy moved from his Belfast home due to security concerns.

In 2018, he resigned from the Privy Council, only a few months after his appointment.
