= Letters patent (United Kingdom) =

Legal instruments issued by the monarch

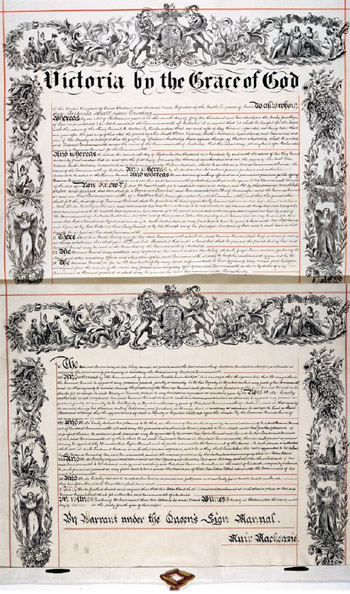
Letters patent issued by Queen Victoria in 1900, creating the office of Governor-General of Australia as part of the process of federation

Letters patent (always in the plural; abbreviated to LsP by the Crown Office), in the United Kingdom, are legal instruments generally issued by the monarch granting an office, right, title (in the peerage and baronetage), or status to a person (and sometimes in regards to corporations and cities). Letters patent have also been used for the creation of corporations or offices, for granting city status, for granting coat of arms, and for granting royal assent.

Patents are prepared by the Crown Office; the name of the Clerk of the Crown in Chancery is subscribed/printed at the end of all documents as a way of authentication of their having passed through the Crown Office.

The form of letters patent have been disclosed by the Crown Office as pro forma texts, and have been compiled here. The Ministry of Justice has said in the past that there are 92 unique types of letters. The text of letters patent can be altered for specification in certain situations, though the following texts are the general basis for draft.

== Terminology ==
In appointing a person to an office through letters patent, there are three documents involved:

- The warrant – This contains the monarch's instructions to the Lord Chancellor to prepare letters patent. The Lord Chancellor delivers the said instructions to the Crown Office, who under the guidance of the Clerk of the Crown prepare the patent.
- Letters patent (sometimes called the patent) – the document which actually makes the appointment; it is sealed by either the Great Seal or its wafer form, and is typed or handwritten on vellum.
- The patent roll entry – this is a record of the warrant. The patent roll entries are bound together at the end of each regnal year and are sent to The National Archives, together with the warrants for permanent retention and storage.

These documents are not always given to the appointee. Letters patent come at a cost for an appointee who elects to receive an illustrated document prepared by the scribes at the Crown Office, but is otherwise entitled to receive a text-only version for nothing. The patent roll entry is exclusively held by The National Archives and is not given to the appointee.

Patents, most notably before the 20th century, were granted with special conditions. The following methods were mainly used in regards to the appointment of individuals to offices, whose purpose was to allow the holder to pick his successor.

- Grant in reversion – granted to a person after the demise of the current holders (or sometimes after the demise of multiple future holders)
- Grant in survivorship – granted to two persons who hold the office collectively; upon the death of one of the parties the remaining assumes the office alone

== Types of letters patent ==
=== Removal from office ===
Persons may be removed of an office through letters patent, though this process is reserved for offices that were granted through patents in the first place. Modern patents, instead of requiring this form be issued, state that the grantee shall replace the present holder of the office in question.

Letters patent removing an individual from office

Charles the Third by the Grace of God of the United Kingdom of Great Britain and Northern Ireland and of Our other Realms and Territories King Head of the Commonwealth Defender of the Faith To all to whom these Presents shall come Greeting Whereas on the XX day of XX two thousand and XX We of Our especial grace and favour conferred XX upon XX as a XX Now Know Ye that We of Our certain knowledge and mere motion do hereby cancel and annul the XX conferred upon the said XX as a XX together with all rights precedences privileges and advantages to the same degree title honour and dignity belonging or appertaining thereto In Witness whereof We have caused these Our Letters to be made Patent Witness Ourself at Westminster the XX day of XX in the XX year of Our Reign

=== Peerage and baronetage ===
Peerages: Peerages may be created for individuals for life, or as hereditary peerages. The ranks of the peerage are, in descending order, duke and duchess, marquess and marchioness, earl and countess, viscount and viscountess, and baron and baroness.

Letters patent conferring hereditary peerages

| Duke | Duchess | Marquess | Marchioness | Earl | Countess | Viscount | Viscountess | Baron | Baroness |
|---|---|---|---|---|---|---|---|---|---|
Charles the Third by the Grace of God of the United Kingdom of Great Britain and Northern Ireland and of Our other Realms and Territories King Head of the Commonwealth Defender of the Faith To all Lords Spiritual and Temporal and all other Our Subjects whatsoever to whom these Presents shall come Greeting Know Ye that We of Our especial grace certain knowledge and mere motion do by these Presents advance create and prefer Our XX to the state degree style dignity title and honour of
| Duke of XX | Duchess of XX | Marquess of XX | Marchioness of XX | Earl [XX/XX of XX/of XX] | Countess [XX/XX of XX/of XX] | Viscount XX [of XX] of XX in XX | Viscountess XX [of XX] of XX in XX | Baron XX [of XX] of XX in XX | Baroness XX [of XX] of XX in XX |
And for Us Our heirs and successors do appoint give and grant unto [him/her] the said name state degree style dignity title and honour of
| Duke of XX | Duchess of XX | Marquess of XX | Marchioness of XX | Earl [XX/XX of XX/of XX] | Countess [XX/XX of XX/of XX] | Viscount XX [of XX] | Viscountess XX [of XX] | Baron XX [of XX] | Baroness XX [of XX] |
| and by these Presents do dignify invest and ennoble him by girding him with a sword and putting a cap of honour and a coronet of gold on his head and by giving into his hand a rod of gold | and by these Presents do dignify invest and really ennoble her with such name state degree title and honour of Duchess of XX | and by these Presents do dignify invest and ennoble him by girding him with a sword and putting a cap of honour and a coronet of gold on his head and by giving into his hand a rod of gold | and by these Presents do dignify invest and really ennoble her with such name state degree title and honour of Marchioness of XX | and by these Presents do dignify invest and ennoble him by girding him with a sword and putting a cap of honour and a coronet of gold on his head | and by these Presents do dignify invest and really ennoble her with such name state degree title and honour of Countess [XX/XX of XX/of XX] | | | | |
to have and to hold
| the said name state degree style dignity title and honour of | | | | the said name degree style dignity title and honour of | | | | | |
| Duke of XX | Duchess of XX | Marquess of XX | Marchioness of XX | Earl [XX/XX of XX/of XX] | Countess [XX/XX of XX/of XX] | | | | |
unto [him/her] and the heirs male of [his/her] body lawfully begotten and to be begotten Willing and by these Presents granting for Us Our heirs and successors that [he/she] and [his/her] heirs male aforesaid and every of them successively may enjoy and use all the rights privileges pre-eminences immunities and advantages to the degree of a
| Duke | | Marquess | | Earl | | Viscount | | Baron | |
duly and of right belonging which
| Dukes | | Marquesses | | Earls | | Viscounts | | Barons | |
of Our United Kingdom do at present use and enjoy In Witness whereof We have caused these Our Letters to be made Patent Witness Ourself at Westminster the XX day of XX in the XX year of Our Reign

Letters patent conferring life peerages
Charles the Third by the Grace of God of the United Kingdom of Great Britain and Northern Ireland and of Our other Realms and Territories King Head of the Commonwealth Defender of the Faith To all Lords Spiritual and Temporal and all other Our Subjects whatsoever to whom these Presents shall come Greeting Know Ye that We of Our especial grace certain knowledge and mere motion in pursuance of the Life Peerages Act 1958 and of all other powers in that behalf Us enabling do by these Presents advance create and prefer Our trusty and well beloved [Counsellor] XX to the state degree style dignity title and honour of [Baron/Baroness] XX [of XX] of XX in XX And for Us Our heirs and successors do appoint give and grant unto [him/her] the said name state degree style dignity title and honour of [Baron/Baroness] XX [of X] to have and to hold unto [him/her] for [his/her] life Willing and by these Presents granting of Us Our heirs and successors that [he/she] may have hold and possess a seat place and voice in the Parliaments and Public Assemblies and Councils of Us Our heirs and successors within Our United Kingdom amongst the Barons And also that he may enjoy and use all the rights privileges pre-eminences immunities and advantages to the degree of a Baron duly and rights belonging which Barons of Our United Kingdom have heretofore used and enjoyed as they do at present use and enjoy In Witness whereof We have caused these Our Letters to be made Patent Witness Ourself at Westminster the XX day of XX in the XX year of Our Reign

Baronetcies: Baronets and baronetesses are not part of the peerage but hold the styles of "sir" and "dame" as applicable. They rank immediately below the barons and baronesses but above knights and dames of the various orders of chivalry within the United Kingdom and the Commonwealth.

Letters patent conferring baronetcies
Charles the Third by the Grace of God of the United Kingdom of Great Britain and Northern Ireland and of Our other Realms and Territories King Head of the Commonwealth Defender of the Faith To all to whom these Presents shall come Greeting Know Ye that We of Our especial grace certain knowledge and mere motion do by these Presents erect appoint and create Our XX to the dignity state and degree of a Baronet And for Us Our heirs and successors do appoint give and grant unto him the said name state degree style dignity title and honour of Baronet unto him and the heirs male of his body lawfully begotten and to be begotten Willing and by these Presents granting for Us Our heirs and successors that he and his heirs male aforesaid may enjoy and use all the rights privileges precedences and advantages to the degree of a Baronet duly and right belonging which Baronets of Our United Kingdom do at present use and enjoy In Witness whereof We have caused these Our Letters to be made Patent Witness Ourself at Westminster the XX day of XX in the XX year of Our Reign

=== HM Government ===
Commissioners of the Great Seal: The Great Seal Act 1688 provided for the office of Lord Chancellor to be put in commission, and since the office held custody of the Great Seal of the Realm, the said custody had to be vested upon Lord Commissioners.

Letters patent would be issued on an ad hoc basis for commissioners to take custody of the Great Seal during any overseas visit by the Lord Chancellor or for when the Lord Chancellor would otherwise be unable to exercise his functions. In 1980 letters patent were issued providing for the delegation of the functions of the Lord Chancellor to commissioners whenever the Lord Chancellor was abroad. Additional letters patent were issued in 1989 expanding the purview of the 1980 letters patent.

1989 letters patent appointing Lord Commissioners of the Great Seal

ELIZABETH THE SECOND by the Grace of God of the United Kingdom of Great Britain and Northern Ireland and of Our other Realms and Territories Queen Head of the Commonwealth Defender of the Faith

To the Commissioners more particularly described hereinafter and all other Our faithful Subjects whatsoever to whom these Presents shall come, Greeting:

WHEREAS Our right trusty and well beloved Counsellor James Peter Hymers Baron Mackay of Clashfern, Our Chancellor of Great Britain, hath humbly besought Us to grant to him and his successors in office (the holder for the time being of the said office being hereafter called Our Chancellor) leave to be absent from Our United Kingdom from time to time during Our Pleasure, and We are graciously please to assent to his request;

AND WHEREAS We deem it expedient to commit to the Commissioners constituted by and for the purposes of these Presents (hereinafter called Our Commissioners) the custody of Our Great Seal of Our Realm (hereinafter called Our Great Seal) during any such absence of Our Chancellor, save when it is in Our custody;

AND WHEREAS We further deem it expedient, if at any time and for so long as Our Chancellor is by reason of ill-health or for any other reason temporarily incapable of exercising the powers, duties and functions of his office, to commit to Our Commissioners both the custody of Our Great Seal (save when it is in Our custody) and also all other his powers, duties and functions;

AND WHEREAS We further deem it expedient to commit to Our Commissioners during any vacancy that may in future occur in the office of Our Chancellor both the custody of Our Great Seal (save when it is in Our custody) and also all other his powers, duties and functions;

NOW YE THAT We do hereby grant leave to Our Chancellor to be absent from Our United Kingdom from time to time during Our Pleasure, until We give further order or direction to the contrary, to the intent that such leave shall not determine by the return of Our Chancellor to Our United Kingdom, but shall endure and be a continuing leave to Our Chancellor to be absent from Our United Kingdom from time to time;

AND THAT We do hereby constitute as Our Commissioners for the purposes of these Presents the holders for the time being of the following offices, that is to say:-

The Lord President of Our Privy Council
The Keeper of Our Privy Seal
The Chairman of Committees of Our House of Lords
The Lord Chief Justice of England
The Master of the Rolls
The Lord Chief Justice of Northern Ireland
The President of the Family Division of Our High Court of Justice
The Vice-Chancellor of the Chancery Division of Our High Court of Justice
The Lords Justice of Our Court of Appeal
The Justices of Our High Court of Justice

AND THAT We do hereby commit to Our said Commissioners:-

during any absence of Our Chancellor from Our United Kingdom in pursuance of Our leave hereinbefore granted, the custody of Our Great Seal and the responsibility for passing under it all such things as have ordinarily been used to be sealed with it, and during any time when Our Chancellor is, whether by reason of ill-health or for any other reason, temporarily incapable of exercising the powers, duties and functions of his office, such incapacity to be certified under instrument under the hand of Our Prime Minister, until such time and Our Prime Minister shall be like instrument certify that Our Chancellor is again able to exercise his powers, duties and functions, or during any vacancy that may occur in the office of Our Chancellor, both the custody of Our Great Seal as aforesaid and also all other powers, duties and functions of Our Chancellor except those appertaining to his office as Speaker of Our House of Lords;

PROVIDED THAT:-

upon the return of Our Chancellor to Our United Kingdom after any absence therefrom in pursuance of Our leave hereinbefore granted, or upon receiving an instrument under the hand of Our Prime Minister certifying that Our Chancellor, after a period of temporary incapacity, is again able to exercise the powers, duties and functions of his office, Our Commissioners shall immediately recommit to Our Chancellor the custody or Our Great Seal without any further Commission, warrant or authority in that respect;

this Our Commission shall not be determined by the return of Our Chancellor to Our United Kingdom, or by the recommitment to him of Our Great Seal, or by its commitment after a vacancy in the office of Our Chancellor to a new holder of that office but, until We give further order or direction to the contrary, this Our Commission shall endure and be a continuing Commission operating during any further absence of Our Chancellor from Our United Kingdom, during any further temporary incapacity of Our Chancellor and during any further vacancy that may occur in his office; save, however, that

nothing in this Commission shall operate to commit the custody of Our Great Seal, or any other power, duty or function of Our Chancellor, to Our Commissioners, during any time when Our Great Seal is in Our custody;

AND WE do hereby declare that:-

during any period when, by virtue of these Presents, the custody of Our Great Seal stands committed to Our Commissioners, any two of Our Commissioners may pass or cause to be passed under Our Great Seal any thing which ought so to pass; and

during any period when, by virtue of these Presents, other powers, duties and functions of Our Chancellor stand committed to Our Commissioners, those powers, duties and functions may be exercised by any three Commissioners being the holders of the following offices, that is to say:-

The Lord President of Our Privy Council
The Keeper of Our Privy Seal
The Lord Chief Justice of England
The Master of the Rolls
The Lord Chief Justice of Northern Ireland
The President of the Family Division of Our High Court of Justice

The Vice-Chancellor of the Chancery Division of Our High Court of Justice provided that the Lord Chief Justice of England or the Master of the Rolls may represent Our Chancellor where he is required to countersign a Royal Warrant of Appointment, or where any person appointed as a Lord Justice of Appeal or Puisne Judge of Our High Court, or as a Circuit Judge, is required to take the oath of allegiance and the judicial oath in his presence or before him; In Witness whereof We have caused these Our Letters to be made Patent Witness Ourself at Westminster the thirty-first day of January in the thirty-seventh year of Our Reign

Lords Commissioners of the Treasury: The Lords Commissioners of His Majesty's Treasury are nowadays appointed through letters patent as a group, with the first person named within the patent being the First Lord of the Treasury, and the second being the Second Lord of the Treasury; the rest of the persons named assume office as junior Lords. There used to be different patents for the First, Second and Junior Lords of the Treasury.

Letters patent appointing Lords Commissioners of the Treasury
Charles the Third by the Grace of God of the United Kingdom of Great Britain and Northern Ireland and of Our other Realms and Territories King Head of the Commonwealth Defender of the Faith To Our right trusty and well beloved Counsellors XX (Note: The Prime Minister.) and XX (Note: The Chancellor of the Exchequer.) Our trusty and well beloved XX (Note: Four or more junior Government Whips.) Greeting Whereas We did by Our Letters Patent under the Great Seal of Our Realm bearing date at Westminster the XX day of XX in the XX year of Our Reign constitute and appoint the persons therein named to be during Our pleasure Commissioners of Our Treasury of Our United Kingdom as therein mentioned Now Know Ye that We Do by these Presents revoke the said Letters Patent And Further Know Ye that We trusting in your wisdom and fidelity of Our especial grace Do constitute and appoint you to be during Our pleasure Commissioners of Our Treasury of Our United Kingdom and to do and perform all things whatsoever which might have heretofore been done and performed by the late Commissioners of Our Treasury of Our United Kingdom And to that end and purpose We Do by these Presents Give and Grant unto you Our said Commissioners full power and authority immediately from henceforth from time to time during the vacancy of the Office of Lord High Treasurer of Our United Kingdom to confirm and approve of all those Orders and Warrants which have been already signed by the late Commissioners of Our Treasury of Our United Kingdom and which are remaining unexecuted And which unto you shall seem reasonable and for Our Service and to cause the same to be duly executed And also to perform and execute all acts and things whatsoever which heretofore might or ought to have been performed by the late Commissioners of Our Treasury of Our United Kingdom in as ample manner and as fully and effectually to all intents and purposes as such Commissioners heretofore have done or might have done by virtue of any power or authority to them belonging or of any Act of Parliament Law Usage or Custom And We Do Hereby Require And Authorise Our Lord High Chancellor of Great Britain or Our Keeper of the Great Seal of Our Realm or Our Commissioners for the Custody of the Great Seal of Our Realm and all other officers and persons whatsoever for the time being whom these Presents shall or may in anywise concern to give full allowance of all things to be done by your Our said Commissioners or any two or more of you according to Our pleasure hereinbefore declared In Witness whereof We have caused these Our Letters to be made Patent Witness Ourself at Westminster the XX day of XX in the XX year of Our Reign

Attorney General for England and Wales:

Letters patent appointing the Attorney General for England and Wales
Charles the Third by the Grace of God of the United Kingdom of Great Britain and Northern Ireland and of Our other Realms and Territories King Head of the Commonwealth Defender of the Faith To all to whom these Presents shall come Greeting Whereas We did on the XX day of XX in the XX year of Our Reign constitute and appoint Our right trusty and well beloved XX to be Our Attorney General during Our Pleasure and by Our Letters Patent under the Great Seal of Our Realm bearing date at Westminster the XX day of XX in the XX year of Our Reign did confirm the said appointment And Whereas on the XX day of XX in the XX year of Our Reign We of Our especial grace did constitute and appoint Our right trusty and well beloved XX to be Our Attorney General in the place of the said XX during Our Pleasure together with all salaries fees authorities and advantages due and of right belonging thereto Now Therefore Know Ye that We by these Presents do hereby confirm the appointment of the said XX to be Our Attorney General In Witness whereof We have caused these Our Letters to be made Patent Witness Ourself at Westminster the XX day of XX in the XX year of Our Reign

Solicitor General for England and Wales:

Letters patent appointing the Solicitor General for England and Wales
Charles the Third by the Grace of God of the United Kingdom of Great Britain and Northern Ireland and of Our other Realms and Territories King Head of the Commonwealth Defender of the Faith To all whom these Presents shall come Greeting Whereas We did on the XX day of XX in the XX year of Our reign constitute and appoint Our right trusty and well beloved XX to be Our Solicitor General during Our Pleasure and by Our Letters Patent under the Great Seal of Our Realm bearing date at Westminster the XX day of XX in the XX year of Our Reign did confirm and the said appointment And Whereas on the XX day of XX in the XX year of Our Reign We of Our especial grace did constitute and appoint Our right trusty and well beloved XX to be Our Solicitor General in the place of the said XX during Our Pleasure together with all salaries fees authorities and advantages due and of right belonging thereto Now Therefore Know Ye that We by these Presents do hereby confirm the appointment of the said XX to be Our Solicitor General In Witness whereof We have caused these our Letters to be made Patent Witness Ourself at Westminster the XX day of XX in the XX year of Our Reign.

Registrar General for England and Wales:

Letters patent appointing the Registrar General for England and Wales
Charles the Third by the Grace of God of the United Kingdom of Great Britain and Northern Ireland and of Our other Realms and Territories King Head of the Commonwealth Defender of the Faith To all to whom these Presents shall come Greeting Whereas by the Registration Service Act 1953 as amended by the Statistics and Registration Service Act 2007 it is lawful for Us from time to time under the Great Seal of Our Realm to appoint a Registrar General for England and Wales And Wales And Whereas by Our Letters Patent under the said Great Seal We did appoint Our trusty and well beloved XX to be such Registrar General And Whereas the said XX has resigned from that Office and the same is now vacant Now Know Ye that We by virtue of the powers vested in Us by the said Acts have nominated and appointed and by these Presents do nominate and appoint Our trusty and well beloved XX to be Registrar General for England and Wales To have hold enjoy exercise and occupy the said Office for and during Our Pleasure the same to be used and exercised according to the provisions of the aforesaid Act of Parliament together with all profits privileges and advantages whatsoever to the same Office in anywise belonging or appertaining In Witness whereof We have caused these Our Letters to be made Patent Witness Ourself at Westminster the XX day of XX in the XX year of Our Reign

Lord Chancellor's pension:

Letters patent granting the Lord Chancellor a pension
Not yet transcribed.

==== Investigatory Powers Tribunal ====
- Interception of Communications (President)
- Interception of Communications (President) (re-appointment)
- Interception of Communications (Vice - President)

==== Devolved nations ====
First Minister of Scotland: as the leader of the Scottish Government, the First Minister chairs the Scottish Cabinet and serves as the Keeper of the Great Seal of Scotland. The First Minister is nominated by the Scottish Parliament from among its members, and is formally appointed by the monarch.

Commission appointing the First Minister of Scotland (Note: While some sources call this document a "Royal Warrant", National Records of Scotland calls it a "Commission".)
Charles the Third by the Grace of God of the United Kingdom of Great Britain and Northern Ireland and of Our other Realms and Territories King Head of the Commonwealth Defender of the Faith to Our trusty and Well Beloved XX Greeting! WHEREAS the said XX has been nominated by the Scottish Parliament from among the members of the Parliament to be the First Minister of the Scottish Government; NOW, therefore, We, in accordance with the provisions of section 45(1) of the Scotland Act 1998, hereby appoint the said XX to the Office of First Minister of the Scottish Government during Our pleasure; IN WITNESS WHEREOF We have ordered the Seal appointed by the Treaty of Union to be kept and made of in place of the Great Seal of Scotland to be appended hereto. Given at Our Court at Buckingham Palace this XX day of XX Two thousand and XX in the XX Year of Our Reign.

PER SIGNATURAM MANU SDN REGIS SUPRA SCRIPTAM (Note: This text translates to "By the Sign Manual of our sovereign lord the King written above" and it's unique to Scottish instruments. It is analogous to "By Warrant under The King's Sign Manual" which is used for many instruments under the Great Seal of the United Kingdom.)

- Heath Service Commissioner – England
- Heath Service Commissioner – Wales

=== Church of England ===
Archbishop of Canterbury:

Letters patent giving Royal Assent to the selection of an Archbishop of Canterbury and for confirming the election
Charles the Third by the Grace of God of the United Kingdom of Great Britain and Northern Ireland and of Our other Realms and Territories King Head of the Commonwealth Defender of the Faith To the Most Reverend Father in God Our right trusty and well beloved Counsellor XX by Divine Providence Lord Archbishop of York Primate of England and Metropolitan the Right Reverend Father in God Our right trusty and well beloved Counsellor XX by Divine Permission Lord Bishop of London the Right Reverend Fathers in God Our right trusty and well beloved XX by Divine Permission Lord Bishop of Winchester XX by Divine Permission Lord Bishop of Salisbury XX by Divine Permission Lord Bishop of Worcester XX by Divine Permission Lord Bishop of Rochester XX by Divine Permission Lord Bishop of Lincoln XX by Divine Permission Lord Bishop of Leicester XX by Divine Permission Lord Bishop of Norwich or to any four or more of you Greeting Whereas the Archiepiscopal See of Canterbury being vacant by the resignation of the Right Reverend Father in God Our right trusty and well beloved Counsellor XX lately Archbishop thereof Upon the humble Petition of the College of Canons of Our Cathedral and Metropolitical Church of Christ Canterbury We have by Our Letters Patent granted them Our leave and licence to choose another Archbishop and Pastor And the said College of Canons by virtue of Our said leave and licence have chosen for themselves and the said Church the Right Reverend Father in God Our right trusty and well beloved XX by Divine Providence Lord Bishop of XX to be their Archbishop and Pastor as by their Letters sealed with their Seal directed to Us thereupon does more fully appear We accepting of such Election have given Our Royal Assent thereto and this We signify unto you by these Presents Requiring and Commanding you by the faith and allegiance by which you stand bound to Us that you or any four or more of you do confirm the aforesaid Election and that you do perform and execute with diligence favour and effect all and singular other things which belong to your Pastoral Office according to the Laws and Statutes of England in this behalf made and provided In Witness whereof We have caused these Our Letters to be made Patent Witness Ourself at Westminster the XX day of XX in the XX year of Our Reign

Archbishop of York:

Letters patent giving Royal Assent to the selection of an Archbishop of York and for confirming the election
Charles the Third by the Grace of God of the United Kingdom of Great Britain and Northern Ireland and of Our other Realms and Territories King Head of the Commonwealth Defender of the Faith To the Most Reverend Our right trusty and well beloved Counsellor XX by Divine Providence Lord Archbishop of Canterbury Primate of All England and Metropolitan the Right Reverends Our right trusty and well beloved Counsellor XX by Divine Permission Lord Bishop of London Our right trusty and well beloved XX by Divine Permission Lord Bishop of Winchester XX by Divine Providence Lord Bishop of Durham XX by Divine Permission Lord Bishop of Carlisle XX by Divine Permission Lord Bishop of Blackburn XX by Divine Permission Lord Bishop of Manchester or to any four or more of you Greeting Whereas the Archiepiscopal See of York being lately vacant by the resignation of the Most Reverend Our right trusty and well beloved Counsellor XX lately Archbishop thereof Upon the humble petition of the College of Canons of Our Cathedral and Metropolitical Church of St Peter in York We have by Our Letters Patent granted them Our leave and licence to choose another Archbishop and Pastor And the said College of Canons by virtue of Our said leave and licence have chosen for themselves and the said Church the Right Reverend Our right trusty and well beloved XX by Divine Permission Lord Bishop of XX to be their Archbishop and Pastor as by their Letters sealed with their Seal directed to Us thereupon does more fully appear We accepting of such Election have given Our Royal Assent thereto and this We signify unto you by these Presents Requiring and Commanding you by the faith and allegiance by which you stand bound to Us that you or any four or more of you do confirm the aforesaid Election and that you do perform and execute with diligence favour and effect all and singular other things which belong to your pastoral office according to the Laws and Statutes of England in this behalf made and provided In Witness whereof We have caused these Our Letters to be made Patent Witness Ourself at Westminster the XX day of XX in the XX year of Our Reign

Congé d'élire:

Letters patent giving authority to a college of canons for electing a bishop

Charles the Third by the Grace of God of the United Kingdom of Great Britain and Northern Ireland and of Our other Realms and Territories King Head of the Commonwealth Defender of the Faith To Our trusty and well beloved the College of Canons of XX Greeting Supplication having been humbly made to Us on your part that whereas the See of XX is now void and destitute of the solace of a Pastor by the resignation of the Right Reverend XX lately Bishop thereof We would be graciously pleased to grant you Our fundatorial leave and licence to elect another Bishop and Pastor of the said See We being favourably inclined to your prayers in this behalf have thought fit by virtue of these Presents to grant you such leave and licence Requiring and Commanding you by the faith and allegiance by which you stand bound to Us that you elect such a person for your Bishop and Pastor as may be devoted to God and useful and faithful to Us and Our Kingdom In Witness whereof We have caused these Our Letters to be made Patent Witness Ourself at Westminster the XX day of XX in the XX year of Our Reign

Rector

Letters patent appointing a rector
Charles the Third by the Grace of God of the United Kingdom of Great Britain and Northern Ireland and of Our other Realms and Territories King Head of the Commonwealth Defender of the Faith To the Right Reverend Father in God Our right trusty and well beloved XX by Divine Permission Bishop of XX or in his absence to his Vicar-General in Spirituals or to any other person or persons having or that shall have sufficient authority in this behalf Greeting We present unto you by these Presents Our beloved in XX Clerk in Holy Orders to the Rectory of XX and in your Diocese now legally void by the resignation of the last Incumbent thereof and to Our presentation in full right Commanding and Requiring you so far as relates to you to admit the said XX to the Rectory of XX aforesaid and him there to institute induct and invest with all and every the rights members and appurtenances thereunto belonging and to do all and singular other matters and things in anywise touching or concerning the admission institution and induction aforesaid which to your pastoral office belongeth or appertaineth In Testimony whereof We cause these Our Letters to be made Patent Witness Ourself at Westminster the XX day of XX in the XX year of Our Reign

- Canon (amending)
- Bishop
- Bishop Suffragan
- Canon
- Dean
- Dean of Jersey

=== Judiciary ===
Lord Chief Justice of England and Wales:

Letters patent appointing the Lord Chief Justice of England and Wales

Charles the Third by the Grace of God of the United Kingdom of Great Britain and Northern Ireland and of Our other Realms and Territories King Head of the Commonwealth Defender of the Faith To all to whom these Presents shall come Greeting Know Ye that We of Our especial grace have given and granted and by these Presents do give and grant to XX the Office of Lord Chief Justice of England and Wales To hold the same so long as he shall well behave himself therein with all wages profits and advantages due and of right belonging thereto In Witness whereof We have caused these Our Letters to be made Patent Witness Ourselves at Westminster the XX day of XX in the XX year of Our Reign

Master of the Rolls:

Letters patent appointing the Master of the Rolls

Charles the Third by the Grace of God of the United Kingdom of Great Britain and Northern Ireland and of Our other Realms and Territories King Head of the Commonwealth Defender of the Faith To all to whom these Presents shall come Greeting Know Ye that We of Our especial grace have given and granted and by these Presents do give and grant to XX the Office of Keeper or Master of the Rolls and Records of Our Chancery of England To hold the same so long as he shall well behave himself therein with all wages profits and advantages due and of right belonging thereto In Witness whereof We have caused these Our Letters to be made Patent Witness Ourselves at Westminster the XX day of XX in the XX year of Our Reign

President of the King's Bench Division:

Letters patent appointing the President of the King's Bench Division

Charles the Third by the Grace of God of the United Kingdom of Great Britain and Northern Ireland and of Our other Realms and Territories King Head of the Commonwealth Defender of the Faith To all to whom these Presents shall come Greeting Know Ye that We of Our especial grace have given and granted and by these Presents do give and grant to XX the Office of President of the King's Bench Division To hold the same so long as he shall well behave himself therein with all wages profits and advantages due and of right belonging thereto In Witness whereof We have caused these Our Letters to be made Patent Witness Ourselves at Westminster the XX day of XX in the XX year of Our Reign

President of the Supreme Court:

Letters patent appointing the President of the Supreme Court

Charles the Third by the Grace of God of the United Kingdom of Great Britain and Northern Ireland and of Our other Realms and Territories King Head of the Commonwealth Defender of the Faith To all to whom these Presents shall come Greeting Know Ye that We of Our especial grace have in pursuance of the Constitutional Reform Act 2005 nominated and appointed and by these Presents do nominate and appoint XX to be President of the Supreme Court of Our United Kingdom To hold the said Office so long as he shall well behave himself therein subject to the provisions in the said Act mentioned with all emoluments privileges rank and precedence whatsoever to the said Office belonging or in anywise appertaining In Witness whereof We have caused these Our Letters to be made Patent Witness Ourselves at Westminster the XX day of XX in the XX year of Our Reign

Deputy President of the Supreme Court:

Letters patent appointing the Deputy President of the Supreme Court

Charles the Third by the Grace of God of the United Kingdom of Great Britain and Northern Ireland and of Our other Realms and Territories King Head of the Commonwealth Defender of the Faith To all to whom these Presents shall come Greeting Know Ye that We of Our especial grace have in pursuance of the Constitutional Reform Act 2005 nominated and appointed and by these Presents do nominate and appoint XX to be Deputy President of the Supreme Court of Our United Kingdom To hold the said Office so long as he shall well behave himself therein subject to the provisions in the said Act mentioned with all emoluments privileges rank and precedence whatsoever to the said Office belonging or in anywise appertaining In Witness whereof We have caused these Our Letters to be made Patent Witness Ourselves at Westminster the XX day of XX in the XX year of Our Reign

Justice of the Supreme Court:

Letters patent appointing a Justice of the Supreme Court

Charles the Third by the Grace of God of the United Kingdom of Great Britain and Northern Ireland and of Our other Realms and Territories King Head of the Commonwealth Defender of the Faith To all to whom these Presents shall come Greeting Whereas XX has resigned his Office as a Judge of the Supreme Court and the same is now vacant Now Know Ye that We of Our especial grace have in pursuance of the Constitutional Reform Act 2005 nominated and appointed and by these Presents Do nominate and appoint XX to be one of Our Judges of the Supreme Court of Our United Kingdom To hold the said Office so long as he shall well behave himself therein subject to the provisions in the said Act mentioned with all emoluments privileges rank and precedence whatsoever to the said Office belonging or in anywise appertaining In Witness whereof We have caused these Our Letters to be made Patent Witness Ourselves at Westminster the XX day of XX in the XX year of Our Reign

Lord of Appeal in Ordinary:

Letters patent appointing a Lord of Appeal in Ordinary

Elizabeth the Second by the Grace of God of the United Kingdom of Great Britain and Northern Ireland and of Our other Realms and Territories Queen Head of the Commonwealth Defender of the Faith To all to whom these Presents shall come Greeting Whereas XX has resigned his Office of a Lord of Appeal in Ordinary and the same is now vacant Now Know Ye that We of Our especial grace have in pursuance of the Appellate Jurisdiction Act 1876 as amended by subsequent enactments nominated and appointed and by these Presents Do nominate and appoint XX to be a Lord of Appeal in Ordinary by the style of Baron XX To hold the said Office so long as he shall well behave himself therein subject to the provisions in the said Act mentioned with all wages profits privileges rank and precedence whatsoever to the said Office belonging or in anywise appertaining and to hold the said style of Baron unto him the said XX during his life In Witness whereof We have caused these Our Letters to be made Patent Witness Ourself at Westminster the XX day of XX in the XX year of Our Reign

Lord Justice of Appeal:

Letters patent appointing a Lord Justice of Appeal

Charles the Third by the Grace of God of the United Kingdom of Great Britain and Northern Ireland and of Our other Realms and Territories King Head of the Commonwealth Defender of the Faith To all to whom these Presents shall come Greeting Know Ye that We of Our especial grace have given and granted and by these Presents do give and grant to XX the Office of one of Our Ordinary Judges of the Court of Appeal To hold the same so long as he shall well behave himself therein with all wages profits and advantages due and of right belonging thereto In Witness whereof We have caused these Our Letters to be made Patent Witness Ourselves at Westminster the XX day of XX in the XX year of Our Reign

Justice of the High Court:

Letters patent appointing a Justice of the High Court
Charles the Third by the Grace of God of the United Kingdom of Great Britain and Northern Ireland and of Our other Realms and Territories King Head of the Commonwealth Defender of the Faith To all to whom these Presents shall come Greeting Know Ye that We of Our especial grace have given and granted and by these Presents do give and grant to XX the Office of one of the Justices of Our High Court To hold the same so long as he shall well behave himself therein with all wages profits and advantages due and of right belonging thereto In Witness whereof We have caused these Our Letters to be made Patent Witness Ourselves at Westminster the XX day of XX in the XX year of Our Reign

King's Counsel learned in the Law:

Letters patent appointing King's Counsel
Charles the Third by the Grace of God of the United Kingdom of Great Britain and Northern Ireland and of Our other Realms and Territories King Head of the Commonwealth Defender of the Faith To all to whom these Presents shall come Greeting Know Ye that We of Our especial grace have constituted ordained and appointed XX one of Our Counsel learned in the Law And We have given and granted unto him as one of Our Counsel aforesaid place precedence and preaudience next after XX in Our Courts And We also will and grant to the said XX full power and sufficient authority to perform do and fulfil all and every the things which any other of Our Counsel learned in the Law as one of Our said Counsel may do and fulfil We Will that this Our grant shall not lessen any Office by Us or by Our Ancestors heretofore given or granted In Witness whereof We have caused these Our Letters to be made Patent Witness Ourselves at Westminster the XX day of XX in the XX year of Our Reign

Honorary King's Counsel:

Letters patent appointing King's Counsel honoris causa
Charles the Third by the Grace of God of the United Kingdom of Great Britain and Northern Ireland and of Our other Realms and Territories King Head of the Commonwealth Defender of the Faith To all to whom these Presents shall come Greeting Know ye that We of Our especial grace have constituted ordained and appointed XX one of Our Counsel learned in the Law honoris causa And We have also given and granted unto him as one of Our Counsel aforesaid precedence at Law in accordance with that Office We Will that this Our Grant shall not lessen any Office by Us or by Our Ancestors heretofore given or granted In Witness whereof We have caused these Our Letters to be made Patent Witness Ourselves at Westminster the XX day of XX in the XX year of Our Reign

- Chancellor of the High Court
- President of the Family Division

=== Crown dependencies ===
- Land Entitlement in the Channel Islands

==== Isle of Man ====
Attorney General of the Isle of Man:

Letters patent appointing the Attorney General of the Isle of Man

Charles the Third by the Grace of God of the United Kingdom of Great Britain and Northern Ireland and of Our other Realms and Territories King Head of the Commonwealth Defender of the Faith To all to whom these Presents shall come Greeting Whereas We did by Our Letters Patent under the Great Seal bearing date at Westminster the XX day of XX in the XX year of Our Reign grant unto XX the Office and place of Our Attorney-General of and in all Our Courts of Justice within Our Island of Man Now Know Ye that We do by these Presents revoke and determine the recited Letters Patent and every clause article and thing therein contained And further Know Ye that We do make ordain and constitute and do by these Presents appoint XX to be Attorney-General of and in all Our Courts of Justice within Our Island of Man for a further period with effect from the XX day of XX XX To have and enjoy during good behaviour the said Office of Our Attorney-General within Our Island for and during Our Pleasure Provided Always and Our Will and Pleasure is that he the said XX shall cease to be Attorney-General of Our said Island of Man and these Our Letters shall cease to have effect on the XX day of XX XX We have also given and granted and by these Presents do give and grant unto the said XX full power and authority to make ordain and depute such Clerks and Officers unto him in every Our Courts within the aforesaid Island in as full and ample manner and form as any other person formerly having or occupying the said Office of Our Attorney-General within Our said Island hath had made ordained or deputed or could or was used to have made ordained or deputed and We do give and grant to the said XX full power and authority to receive all fees fines casualties profits and commodities heretofore received and taken to the said Office belonging or appertaining for which he shall from time to time duly account to the Department entitled thereto and which he shall pay over to such Department Provided also and Our Will and Pleasure is that the said Office shall be held by the said XX upon such terms and conditions as the said Office was held by any former Attorney-General in Our said Island and in accordance with any instructions which may be given from time to time by one of Our Principal Secretaries of State Provided lastly and We will and by these Presents firmly enjoining do command that the said XX do and shall be resident within Our said Island and that he shall execute the said Office in his own proper person except in case of his sickness or any other incapacity or when absent from duty with the permission of Our Lieutenant Governor In Witness whereof We have caused these Our Letters to be made Patent Witness Ourselves at Westminster the XX day of XX in the XX year of Our Reign

==== Island of Guernsey ====
- Bailiff of the Island of Guernsey
- Bailiff of the Island of Guernsey (Deputy)

==== Island of Jersey ====
- Advocate General of Jersey
- Procurator-General of Jersey
- Bailiff of the Island of Jersey
- Bailiff of the Island of Jersey (Deputy)

=== Local government ===
City status: this honour is granted to a select group of communities, although it carries no special rights outside of the prestige and pride that comes along with it.

Letters patent granting city status
Charles the Third by the Grace of God of the United Kingdom of Great Britain and Northern Ireland and of Our other Realms and Territories King Head of the Commonwealth Defender of the Faith To all to whom these Presents shall come Greeting Whereas We for divers good causes and considerations Us thereunto moving are graciously pleased to confer on the Town of XX in Our County of the status of a City Now Therefore Know Ye that We of Our especial grace and favour and mere motion do by these Presents ordain declare and direct that the Town of XX shall henceforth have the status of a City and shall have all such rank liberties privileges and immunities as are incident to a City In Witness whereof We have caused these Our Letters to be made Patent Witness Ourself at Westminster the XX day of XX in the XX year of Our Reign

- City and mayor
- Lord mayoralty
- London Lieutenancy
- Lieutenancy

Lord-Lieutenant: This office is mainly awarded to notable individuals who have retired.

Letters patent granting office of Lord-Lieutenant
Charles the Third by the Grace of God of the United Kingdom of Great Britain and Northern Ireland and of Our other Realms and Territories King Head of the Commonwealth Defender of the Faith to Our trusty and well beloved XX Greeting Whereas by the Lieutenancies Act 1997 it is {amongst other things} enacted that it shall be lawful for Us from time to time to appoint a Lord-Lieutenant for each County in England and Wales and for Greater London Now Know Ye that We by virtue of the said Act have nominated and appointed and by these Presents do nominate and appoint you the said XX {subject to the limit of age hereinafter mentioned} to be Our Lord-Lieutenant of and in Our County of XX for and during Our Pleasure And We do by these Presents give and grant unto you full power and authority to do execute transfer and perform all and singular the matters and things which to a Lord-Lieutenant to be nominated and appointed by Us for the said County of XX do by force of any law in anywise belong to be done executed transacted or performed And therefore We do hereby command you that according to the tenor of these Our Letters you said XX shall cease to be Our Lord-Lieutenant of and in Our County of XX and these Presents shall cease to have effect on the XX day of XX in the year of Our Lord Two thousand and XX being the day when you the said XX attain the age of seventy-five years In Witness whereof We have caused these Our Letters to be made Patent Witness Ourself at Westminster the XX day of XX in the XX year of Our Reign

- Governor and Captain of the Isle of Wight

=== Parliament ===
Clerk of the Parliaments

Letters patent appointing the Clerk of the Parliaments
Charles the Third by the Grace of God of the United Kingdom of Great Britain and Northern Ireland and of Our other Realms and Territories King Head of the Commonwealth Defender of the Faith To all to whom these Presents shall come Greeting Whereas the Office of Clerk of the Parliaments of Us Our heirs and successors has become vacant by the resignation of Our trusty and well beloved XX Now Know Ye that We of Our especial grace Do constitute and appoint Our trusty and well beloved XX to be Clerk of the Parliaments of Us Our heirs and successors on the place of the said XX to hold and exercise the said Office during his good behaviour therein for a period of three years from the date hereof Together with all privileges profits advantages and emoluments due and of right belonging to the said Office And that he the said XX shall be eligible for re-appointment thereafter And We do declare that the duties of the said Office shall be executed by the said XX in person and that he shall be removable by Us Our heirs and successors upon an Address of the House of Lords to Us Our heirs and successors for that purpose In Witness whereof We have caused these Our Letters to be made Patent Witness Ourself at Westminster the XX day of XX in the XX year of Our Reign

Under Clerk of the Parliaments:

Letters patent appointing the Under Clerk of the Parliaments

Charles the Third by the Grace of God of the United Kingdom of Great Britain and Northern Ireland and of Our other Realms and Territories King Head of the Commonwealth Defender of the Faith To all to whom these Presents shall come Greeting Whereas the Office of Under Clerk of the Parliaments of Us Our heirs and successors has become vacant by the resignation of XX Now Know Ye that We of Our especial grace Do give and grant unto XX the Office of Under Clerk of the Parliaments of Us Our heirs and successors vacant by the resignation of the said XX And We will and grant that the said XX may be the Under Clerk of the Parliaments and every of them of Us Our heirs and successors to attend upon the Commons of Our United Kingdom of Great Britain and Northern Ireland called and to be called to the Parliaments of Us Our heirs and successors To hold and exercise the said Office unto the said XX during his natural life Together with all profits privileges and advantages due and of right belonging thereto In Witness whereof We have caused these Our Letters to be made Patent Witness Ourselves at Westminster the XX day of XX in the XX year of Our Reign

- Parliamentary Commissioner for Administration
- Serjeant at Arms in Ordinary
- Serjeant at Arms in Ordinary (Commons)

Comptroller and Auditor General:

Letters patent appointing the Comptroller and Auditor General
Charles the Third by the Grace of God of the United Kingdom of Great Britain and Northern Ireland and of Our other Realms and Territories King Head of the Commonwealth Defender of the Faith To all to whom these Presents shall come Greeting Whereas we did by Letters Patent under the Great Seal bearing date at Westminster the XX day of XX in the XX year of Our Reign nominate and appoint Our trusty and well beloved XX to be Comptroller General of the Receipt and Issue of Our Exchequer and Auditor General of Public Accounts And Whereas the said XX has retired and an address has been presented to Us by Our House of Commons praying that We appoint Our trusty and well beloved XX to the said Office Now Know Ye that We trusting in the wisdom and fidelity of the said XX Do by these Presents nominate and appoint him to be Our Comptroller General of the Receipt and Issue of Our Exchequer and Auditor General of Public Accounts To have and to hold the said Office of Comptroller and Auditor General together with the powers authorities and duties belonging thereto during good behaviour in accordance with and subject to the provisions of the Statutes in this behalf made and provided In Witness whereof We have caused these Our Letters to be made Patent Witness Ourself at Westminster the XX day of XX in the XX year of Our Reign

=== Royal Family ===
Counsellors of State

Letters patent appointing Counsellors of State
Charles the Third by the Grace of God of the United Kingdom of Great Britain and Northern Ireland and of Our other Realms and Territories King Head of the Commonwealth Defender of the Faith To all Archbishops Dukes Marquesses Earls Viscounts Bishops Barons Baronets Knights Citizens and Burgesses and all other Our faithful Subjects whatsoever to who these Presents shall come Greeting WHEREAS it is Our intention to be absent from Our United Kingdom for the purpose of visiting XX AND WHEREAS by the enactments known as the Regency Acts 1937 to 1953 it is (amongst other things) enacted that in the event of Our absence or intended absence from Our United Kingdom We may in order to prevent delay or difficulty in the despatch of public business by Letters Patent under the Great Seal delegate to Our Counsellors of State such of Our Royal functions (except the power to grant any rank title or dignity the peerage) as may be specified in the Letters Patent AND WHEREAS the persons described by the said enactments as the Counsellors of State to be named in such Letters Patent are as follows that is to say Our most dearly beloved Wife and most faithful Counsellor Camilla Queen Consort Our most dearly beloved Son and most faithful Counsellor William Arthur Philip Louis Prince of Wales Knight of Our Most Noble Order of the Garter Knight of Our Most Ancient and Most Noble Order of the Thistle Our most dearly beloved Son Prince Henry Charles Albert David Duke of Sussex Our most dearly beloved Brother Prince Andrew Albert Christian Edward Duke of York Knight of Our Most Noble Order of the Garter Knight Grand Cross of Our Royal Victorian Order and Our most dearly beloved Niece Princess Beatrice Mrs Edoardo Mapelli Mozzi subject however to the provisions enabling Us by the Letters Patent to except from among the number of those Counsellors any person who is absent from Our United Kingdom or intends to be so absent during the period of Our absence KNOW YE that by virtue of the said enactments We do hereby delegate for the period of Our absence to the said Counsellors of State (except during their absence from Our United Kingdom those who are or intend to be so absent) the Royal functions specified in the First Schedule annexed hereto to be exercised jointly by not less than two of their number subject to the following exceptions and conditions namely – That they the said Counsellors of State shall not have power to grant any rank title or dignity of the peerage That they shall not receive any homage required to be done to Ourself That they shall not approve or sign any warrant fiat submission or other document for which Our approval or signature is required for or in connection with any of the matters described in the Second Schedule annexed hereto and That if We signify or it appears to them that they should not act in any matter or for any purpose without Our previous special approval they shall not act in that matter or for that purpose without that approval Commanding all and singular Archbishops Dukes Marquesses Earls Viscounts Bishops Barons Baronets Knights Citizens and Burgesses and all other Our Officers Ministers and Subjects that in everything appertaining to the matters aforesaid they be attendant counselling and helping the said Counsellors of State as it behoves them In Witness whereof We have caused these Our Letters to be made Patent Witness Ourself at Westminster the XX day of XX in the XX year of Our Reign

Principality of Wales: this title is held by the eldest son of the Monarch, who is in turn heir-apparent to the throne; the Prince supports The King in discharging his royal duties. The title has, since 1301, been held in conjunction with that of Earl of Chester.

Letters patent granting the Principality of Wales and the Earldom of Chester
Charles the Third by the Grace of God of the United Kingdom of Great Britain and Northern Ireland and of Our other Realms and Territories King Head of the Commonwealth Defender of the Faith To all Lords Temporal and all other Our subjects whatsoever to whom these presents shall come Greeting Know ye that We have made and created and by these Our Letters Do make and create Our most dear Son XX Prince of the United Kingdom of Great Britain and Northern Ireland Duke of Cornwall and Rothesay Earl of Carrick Baron of Renfrew Lord of the Isles and Great Steward of Scotland Prince of Wales and Earl of Chester And to the same Our most dear XX Have given and granted and by this Our present Charter Do give grant and confirm the name style title dignity and honour of the same Principality and Earldom And him Our most dear Son XX as has been accustomed We do ennoble him and invest with the said Principality by girding him with a Sword and by putting a Coronet on his head and a Gold Ring on his finger and also by delivering a Gold Rod into his hand that he may preside there and may direct and defend those parts To hold to him and his heirs Kings of the United Kingdom of Great Britain and Northern Ireland and of Our other Realms and Territories Heads of the Commonwealth forever Wherefore We will and strictly command for Us Our heirs and successors that Our most dear Son XX may have the name style title state dignity and honour of the Principality of Wales and Earldom of Chester aforesaid unto him and his heirs Kings of the United Kingdom of Great Britain and Northern Ireland and of Our other Realms and Territories Heads of the Commonwealth as is above mentioned In Witness whereof We have caused these Our Letters to be made Patent Witness Ourself at Westminster the XX day of XX in the XX year of Our Reign

=== Royal Household ===
Master of the Horse:

Astronomer Royal:

Letters patent appointing the Astronomer Royal
Charles the Third by the Grace of God of the United Kingdom of Great Britain and Northern Ireland and of Our other Realms and Territories King Head of the Commonwealth Defender of the Faith To all to whom these presents shall come Greeting Whereas the Office of Astronomer Royal is now vacant Now Know Ye that We of Our especial grace certain knowledge and mere motion have given and granted an by these Presents do give and grant unto Our trusty and well beloved XX the Office and Place of Astronomer Royal Granting unto him the said XX the Office and Place of Astronomer Royal aforesaid To have hold and exercise the said Office during Our Pleasure together with all Privileges and Advantages thereunto belonging or appertaining In Witness whereof We have caused these Our Letters to be made Patent Witness Ourself at Westminster the XX day of XX in the XX year of Our Reign

Queen's Printer of Acts of Parliament:

Letters patent appointing the Queen's Printer of Acts of Parliament
Charles the Third by the Grace of God of the United Kingdom of Great Britain and Northern Ireland and of Our other Realms and Territories King Head of the Commonwealth Defender of the Faith To all to whom these Presents shall come Greeting Whereas We did by Our Letters patent under the Great Seal bearing date the XX day of XX in the XX year of Our Reign and in the year of Our Lord XX XX XX and XX grant unto Our trusty and well beloved XX the Office of Printer to Us of all Acts of Parliament and did thereby appoint XX to hold and exercise all rights and privileges in connection with copyrights the property of Us during Our pleasure Know ye that We do hereby revoke the said Letters Patent And Further Know Ye that We of Our especial grace Do by these Presents grant unto Our right trusty and well beloved XX the Office of Printer to Us of all and singular Acts of Parliament heretofore printed by the Royal Typographers for the time being or hereafter to be printed or purporting so to be by the command or authority of Us or of the Parliament of Our United Kingdom To Hold and exercise the said Office with all privileges thereto belonging during Our pleasure and We do appoint the said XX to hold and exercise during Our pleasure on behalf of Us Our heirs and successors all rights and privileges in connection with such copyrights and database rights as now are or maybe from time to time become the property of Us Our heirs and successors as fully as if such copyrights and database rights were the property of the said XX In Witness whereof We have caused these Our Letters to be made Patent Witness Ourself at Westminster on the XX day of XX in the XX year of Our Reign

Letters patent appointing the Controller of HM Stationery Office as Queen's Printer
Charles the Third by the Grace of God of the United Kingdom of Great Britain and Northern Ireland and of Our other Realms and Territories King Head of the Commonwealth Defender of the Faith To all to whom these Presents shall come Greeting Whereas We did by Our Letters Patent under the Great Seal bearing date the XX day of XX in the XX year of Our Reign and in the year of Our Lord Two thousand and XX grant unto Our trusty and well beloved XX then Controller of Our Stationery Office the Office of Printer to Us of all Acts of Parliament and did thereby appoint him to hold and exercise all rights and privileges in connection with copyrights property of Us during Our pleasure Now Know Ye that We do hereby revoke the said Letters Patent And Further Know Ye that We of Our especial grace Do by these Presents grant unto Our trusty and well beloved XX Keeper of Public Records the Office of Printer to Us of all and singular Acts of Parliament heretofore printed by the Royal Typographers for the time being or hereafter to be printed or purporting so to be by the command or authority of Us or of the Parliament of Our United Kingdom To Hold and exercise the said Office with all privileges thereto belonging during Our pleasure And We do appoint the said XX to hold and exercise during Our pleasure on behalf of Us Our heirs and successors all rights and privileges in connection with such copyrights and databse rights as now are or maybe from time to time become the property of Us Our heirs and successors as fully as if such copyrights and database rights were the property of the said XX In Witness whereof We have caused these Our Letters to be made Patent Witness Ourself at Westminster on the XX day of XX in the XX year of Our Reign

Lord High Almoner:

Letters patent appointing the Lord High Almoner
Charles the Third by the Grace of God of the United Kingdom of Great Britain and Northern Ireland and of Our other Realms and Territories King Head of the Commonwealth Defender of the Faith To all to whom these Presents shall come Greeting Know Ye that We of Our especial grace certain knowledge and mere motion have given and granted and by these Presents Do give and grant unto XX the Office of Our High Almoner void by the resignation of XX To hold the same during Our Pleasure together with all rights duties privileges and advantages appertaining thereto In Witness whereof We have caused these Our Letters to be made Patent Witness Ourself at Westminster on the XX day of XX in the XX year of Our Reign

==== College of Arms ====
Garter Principal King of Arms: Garter is the senior King of Arms and the senior Officer of Arms of the College of Arms. Garter is responsible for running the college and has the duty of announcing the new monarch after the death of the current one.

Letters patent appointing the Garter Principal King of Arms
Charles the Third by the Grace of God of the United Kingdom of Great Britain and Northern Ireland and of Our other Realms and Territories King Head of the Commonwealth Defender of the Faith To all to whom these Presents shall come Greetings Whereas it hath been of ancient times accustomed that amongst other Officers and Ministers whom it is meet should be attendant upon the persons of Princes suitable to their high dignity and glory these should be more especially proper Officers to whom the care and office of Arms both in times of War and Peace may be committed And Whereas the Office of Gater Principal King of Arms has become vacant by the death of XX Know Ye Therefore that We for divers good causes and considerations Us hereunto especially moving of Our especial grace certain knowledge and mere motion have advanced made constituted ordained created and crowned And by these Presents for Us Our heirs and successors do advance make constitute ordain create and crown XX the Principal King of English Arms and Principal Officer of Arms of Our Most Noble Order of the Garter And We do by these Presents for Us Our heirs and successors give and grant unto the said XX that Office which is commonly called Garter and the name Garter with the style title liberties pre-eminences and commodities suitable agreeable and belonging and anciently accustomed to the same Office And him the said XX We do by these Presents really invest therewith To have enjoy occupy and exercise that Office and the name style title liberties pre-eminences and commodities aforesaid unto the said XX by himself or his sufficient deputy (such deputy being one of the Kings of Arms and Principal Heralds of England of Us Our heirs and successors or one of the Heralds of Arms of Us Our heirs and successors and none other) during his good behaviour in the said Office Together with all liveries rights fees profits adnantages commodities and emoluments whatsoever to the said Office howsoever belonging and appertaining except such ancient and customary fees are due to the said Office of Gater Principal King of Arms on and as incident to the creation of dignities Provided always and Our Will and Pleasure if that he the said XX shall on the attainment of sixty-five years of age offer to retire from the said Office such offer to retire to be addressed in writing under his hand to the Earl Marshal of England for the time being and these Our Letters shall cease to have affect upon Our acceptance of such offer Giving moreover and by these Presents for Us our heirs and successors granting to the said XX all and singular other things which are incumbent upon the said Office of Garter Principal King of Arms or are known to be appertaining of right or by customs in the times past to be done transacted and executed And further of Our more abundant grace We do give and by virtue of these Presents for Us Our heirs and successors do grant unto the said XX by the name of Garter authority power and license with the consent of the Earl Marshal of England for the time being in writing under his hand and seal from time to time first given or signified of granting and appointing to eminent men Letters Parent of Arms and Crests jointly and together with Clarenceux and Norroy and Ulster King of Arms or one of them or by himself alone without them the will and pleasure of the Earl Marshal of England for the time being according to the ordinances and statutes from time to time respectively issued or to be issued in that behalf and not otherwise nor in any other manner so that if the said XX shall act in any of the premises to the contrary this Our present grant shall cease and be of no effect Moreover We have given and granted by these Presents for Us Our heirs and successors do give and grant unto the said XX advanced a Principal King of English Arms as aforesaid forty-nine pounds and seven pence of lawful money of Great Britain by the year by reason and in consideration of the same Office and for exercise thereof To have and receive the said sum of forty-nine pounds and seven pence by the year to him and said XX at the Office of the Lord Chamberlain of Our Household for the time being yearly and every year (to wit) the first payment thereof to begin and be computed by the day according to the rate of forty-nine pounds and seven pence by the year from the XX day of XX ultimo being the day of retirement of the said XX and paid at and for the XX day of XX now next ensuing and the subsequent payments to be made annually on the XX day of XX for so long as he shall hold the said Office And We do hereby declare that the Earl Marshal of England for the time being may by Warrant under his hand from time to time appoint one of the Kings of Arms and Principal Heralds of England of Us Our heirs and successors or one of the Heralds of Arms of England of Us Our heirs and successors to be Deputy of the said XX in the said Office of Garter Principal King of Arms for such time as shall be specified in the Warrant And that any Deputy so appointed shall receive as remuneration for acting as such Deputy such part of the emoluments accruing by virtue of these Presents to the said XX as the Earl Marshal may assign in the said Warrant and upon the appointment of any such Deputy the powers and duties of any Deputy appointed by the said XX under the powers upon him in these Letters Patent hereinbefore conferred shall cease and determine In Witness whereof We have caused these Our Letters to be made Patent Witness Ourself at Westminster the XX day of XX in the XX year of Our Reign

King of Arms (Clarenceux and Norroy and Ulster):

Letters patent appointing the Norroy and Ulster King of Arms
Charles the Third by the Grace of God of the United Kingdom of Great Britain and Northern Ireland and of Our other Realms and Territories King Head of the Commonwealth Defender of the Faith To all to whom these Presents shall come Greeting Whereas it hath been of ancient times accustomed that amongst other Officers and Ministers whom it is meet should be attendant upon the persons of Princes suitable to their high dignity and glory there should be more especially proper Officers to whom the case and Office of Arms both in times of war and peace may be committed And Whereas the Office of XX King of Arms and Principal Herald of XX is become vacant by the retirement of XX Know Ye therefore that We of Our especial grace certain knowledge and mere motion and for divers other good causes and considerations Us hereunto especially moving by these Presents for Us Our heirs and successors Do advance make ordain constitute and create XX a King of Arms and Principal Herald of XX And We do by these Presents Do give unto him the name XX which We do give and grant unto the said XX with the style title liberties per-eminences and commodities suitable agreeable and belonging and anciently accustomed to the said Office And him We have really crowned and invested and by these Presents Do crown and invest therewith To have enjoy occupy and exercise the said Office and the name style title pre-eminences and commodities aforesaid unto him the said XX during his good behaviour in the said Office with all rights profits commodities and emoluments whatsoever to the same Office in anywise belonging and appertaining Provided always and Our Will and Pleasure is that he the said XX shall on the attainment of seventy years of age offer to retire from the said Office such offer to retire to be addressed in writing under his hand to the Earl Marshal of England for the time being and these Our Letters shall cease to have effect upon Our acceptance of such offer Giving moreover and granting unto the said Office of XX

King of Arms or are known to be appertaining of right or by custom in times past to be done transacted and executed except such ancient and customary fees as are due to the said Office on the creation of dignities And further of Our more abundant grace We do give and by virtue of these Presents grant unto the said XX authority power and licence with the consent of the Earl Marshal of England or his Deputy for the time being in writing under their hands and seals from time to time first given or signified of granting and appointing to eminent men Letters Patent of Arms and Crests jointly and together with XX and XX Kings of Arms or one of them or by himself alone without them at the will and pleasure of the Earl Marshal or his Deputy for the time being according to their Ordinances or Statues from time to time issued or to be issued respectively in that behalf and not otherwise nor in other manner So that if the said XX shall act in any of the premises to the contrary this Our present grant and all things herein contained shall cease and be utterly and altogether void and of none effect or force whatsoever Moreover We have given and granted and by these Presents for Us Our heirs and successors Do give and grant unto the said XX advanced by Us a King of Arms and Principal Herald of XX as aforesaid twenty pounds and twenty-five pence by the year by reason and in consideration of the same Office and for the exercise thereof To have and receive the same unto him the said XX yearly and every year during his good behaviour in the same Office at the Office of the Lord Chamberlain of Our Household for the time being the same to commence on and from the XX day of XX in the year of Our Lord XX thousand and XX being the day immediately following the retirement of the said XX and be computed and paid by the day after the rate of twenty pounds and twenty-five pence by the year unto and for the XX day of XX now next ensuing and the subsequent payments thereof to be made annually on the XX day of XX Together with such liveries and clothing as and in the same manner and form as any other person being a King of Arms or Herald of Arms in XX aforesaid had and received in the time of Edward the Third Our Progenitor heretofore King of England or afterwards to have and receive such liveries and clothing unto him the said XX yearly during his good behaviour in the said Office at the Great Wardrobe of Us Our heirs and successors by the hands of the Keeper of the same Wardrobe of Us Our heirs and successors for the time being In Witness whereof We have caused these Our Letters to be made Patent Witness Ourself at Westminster the XX day of XX in the XX year of Our Reign

Heralds of Arms (Richmond, Chester, York):

Letters patent appointing Heralds of Arms in Ordinary
Charles the Third by the Grace of God of the United Kingdom of Great Britain and Northern Ireland and of Our other Realms and Territories King Head of the Commonwealth Defender of the Faith To all to whom these Presents shall come Greeting Whereas the Office of XX Herald of Arms has become vacant by the promotion of XX to the Office of XX Now Know Ye that We for divers causes and considerations Us hereunto especially moving of Our especial grace certain knowledge and mere motion have made ordained created advanced constituted and invested and by these Presents for Us Our heirs and successors do make ordain create advance constitute and invest XX one of Our Heralds of Arms and have given and by these Presents do give unto him the name commonly called XX And by these Presents for Us Our heirs and successors do give and grant unto him the style title liberty and pre-eminence suitable and agreeable and anciently accustomed to the said Office To have enjoy occupy and exercise that Office and the name style title liberty and pre-eminence aforesaid during his good behaviour in the same Office Provided always and Our Will and Pleasure is that he the said XX otherwise XX shall on the attainment of seventy years of age offer to retire from the said Office such offer to retire to be addressed in writing under his hand to the Earl Marshal of England for the time being and these Our Letters shall cease to have effect upon Our acceptance of such offer And We have further given and granted and by these Presents for Us Our heirs and successors do give and grant unto the said XX otherwise XX for the exercise of the said Office an annuity or yearly salary of Seventeen pounds and eighty pence of good and lawful money of Great Britain To have and yearly to receive the same at the Office of the Lord Chamberlain of Our Household the first payment thereof to commence from the XX day of XX XX thousand and XX being the date of the promotion of the said XX to be computed by the day after the yearly rate aforesaid and made unto and for the XX day of XX now next ensuing and the subsequent payments thereof to be made yearly on the XX day of XX Together with all other fees rights profits perquisites privileges pre-eminences advantages and emoluments whatsoever incident or belonging to the said Office except such ancient and customary fees as are due to the said Office on the creation of dignities In Witness whereof We have caused these Our Letters to be made Patent Witness Ourself at Westminster the XX day of XX in the XX year of Our Reign

Pursuivants of Arms (Bluemantle, Portcullis, Rouge Croix, Rouge Dragon):

Letters patent appointing Pursuivants of Arms in Ordinary
Charles the Third by the Grace of God of the United Kingdom of Great Britain and Northern Ireland and of Our other Realms and Territories King Head of the Commonwealth Defender of the Faith To all to whom these Presents shall come Greeting Whereas the Office of XX Pursuivant of Arms has become vacant by the promotion of XX to the Office of XX Now Know Ye that We for divers causes and considerations Us hereunto especially moving of Our especial grace certain knowledge and mere motion have made ordained created advanced constituted and invested and by these Presents for Us Our heirs and successors do make ordain create advance constitute and invest XX one of Our Pursuivants of Arms and have given and by these Presents do give unto him the name commonly called XX And by these Presents for Us Our heirs and successors do give and grant unto him the style title liberty and pre-eminence suitable and agreeable and anciently accustomed to the said Office To have enjoy occupy and exercise that Office and the name style title liberty and pre-eminence aforesaid during his good behaviour in the same Office Provided always and Our Will and Pleasure is that he the said XX otherwise XX shall on the attainment of seventy years of age offer to retire from the said Office such offer to retire to be addressed in writing under his hand to the Earl Marshal of England for the time being and these Our Letters shall cease to have effect upon Our acceptance of such offer And We have further given and granted and by these Presents for Us Our heirs and successors do give and grant unto the said XX otherwise XX for the exercise of the said Office an annuity or yearly salary of Thirteen pounds and ninety-five pence of good and lawful money of Great Britain To have and yearly to receive the same at the Office of the Lord Chamberlain of Our Household the first payment thereof to commence from the XX day of XX XX thousand and XX being the date of the promotion of the said XX to be computed by the day after the yearly rate aforesaid and made unto and for the XX day of XX now next ensuing and the subsequent payments thereof to be made yearly on the XX day of XX Together with all other fees rights profits perquisites privileges pre-eminences advantages and emoluments whatsoever incident or belonging to the said Office except such ancient and customary fees as are due to the said Office on the creation of dignities In Witness whereof We have caused these Our Letters to be made Patent Witness Ourself at Westminster the XX day of XX in the XX year of Our Reign

==== Royal palaces ====
Constable of the Tower of London:

Letters patent appointing the Constable of the Tower of London

Charles the Third by the Grace of God of the United Kingdom of Great Britain and Northern Ireland and of Our other Realms and Territories King Head of the Commonwealth Defender of the Faith To all to whom these Presents shall come Greeting Know Ye that We of Our especial grace certain knowledge and mere motion have given and granted and by these Presents Do give and grant unto XX the Office and place of Constable of Our Tower of London together with the title and ceremonial duties and such other duties as shall be signified through Our Secretary of State for Culture Media and Sport with power and authority subject as aforesaid to constitute Yeoman Warders and other subordinate officers in Our Tower with the agreement of Our Secretary of State Commanding and requiring that in performing the duties thereof XX shall be obedient unto such commands orders or directions as We Our heirs or successors may from time to time signify to him XX through Our Secretary of State To have hold exercise and enjoy the said Office of Constable of Our Tower of London unto XX during Our pleasure (but subject to a maximum tenure from the XX day of XX XX to the XX day of XX XX) In Witness whereof We have caused these Our Letters to be made Patent Witness Ourselves at Westminster the XX day of XX in the XX year of Our Reign

Lieutenant of the Tower of London:

Letters patent appointing the Lieutenant of the Tower of London

Charles the Third by the Grace of God of the United Kingdom of Great Britain and Northern Ireland and of Our other Realms and Territories King Head of the Commonwealth Defender of the Faith To all to whom these Presents shall come Greeting Know Ye that We reposing great trust and confidence in the care and fidelity of XX of Our especial grace certain knowledge and mere motion Do by these Presents give and grant unto the said XX the Office or Place of Lieutenant of Our Tower of London To have hold exercise and enjoy the said Office or Place of Lieutenant of Our Tower of London during Our Pleasure (but subject to a maximum tenure from the XX day of XX XX to the XX day of XX XX) To be subordinate to Our Constable of Our said Tower of London now and for the time being in all things touching the execution of the said Office of Constable and in his absence during such time as the said Office of Constable shall be vacant to exercise and perform all powers and authorities matters and things whatsoever relating to the Office in as full and ample manner as the Constable might or could do if he were personally present Provided always that the said XX shall hold the Office of Lieutenant of Our Tower of London subject to the conditions relating to the same contained any Warrant under Our Sign Manual in force from time to time relating to the pay appointment promotion and non-effective pay of Our Army and to exercise the same in person according to the powers and authorities given by Us or otherwise from time to time In Witness whereof We have caused these Our Letters to be made Patent Witness Ourselves at Westminster the XX day of XX in the XX year of Our Reign

Governor and Constable of Windsor Castle:

Letters patent appointing the Constable and Governor of Windsor Castle

Charles the Third by the Grace of God of the United Kingdom of Great Britain and Northern Ireland and of Our other Realms and Territories King Head of the Commonwealth Defender of the Faith To all to whom these Presents shall come Greeting Know Ye that We reposing especial trust and confidence in the care fidelity and circumspection of XX of Our especial Grace certain knowledge and mere motion Have given and granted And by these Presents Do give and grant unto the said XX the Offices of Governor and Constable of Our Castle of Windsor in Our Royal County of Berkshire and of all other places whatsoever belonging or appertaining to the said Offices or either of them or being parcel thereof And him the said XX Governor and Constable of Our said Castle of Windsor and of all other places belonging or appertaining to the said Offices or either of them or being parcel thereof We do make ordain and constitute and by these Presents with effect from the eighteenth day of December Two thousand and twenty-two To have hold exercise and enjoy the said Offices to be unto the said XX during Our Pleasure the duties of the said Offices to be executed by the said XX in person with all salaries privileges and pre-eminences belonging or appertaining to the said Offices or either of them Provided always and We do exclude out of this Our grant the custody or the Officer of Keeper of Our Park adjoining to Our Castle aforesaid called The Little Park and of the Stables built near Eton and by Charles Earl of Carlisle formerly used and enjoyed and also the Officer of Keeper of all Our Forests Parks and Warrens of Windsor in Our said Royal County of Berkshire and of all other places whatsoever to the Office of Keeper of the same belonging and also the Office of Lieutenant of Our said Forest of Windsor Provided also and by these Presents We will that if Our said Governor and Constable of Our said Castle of Windsor should appoint any person or persons to be Ranger or Rangers of that part of Our said Forest commonly called by the name or description of Swinley Rails or of that part of Our said Forest commonly called by the name or description of Swinley Lodge or of that part of Our said Forest commonly called by the name or description of Swinley Walk except such person or persons as it shall please Us from time to time to command or direct under Our Royal Sign Manual or in any other manner as to Us shall seem expedient then these Our Letters Patent shall be void and of none effect anything in these Presents contained to the contrary thereof in anywise notwithstanding And We do hereby strictly charge and command all and singular Mayors Bailiffs Constables and other Our Officers Ministers and Subjects whatsoever inhabiting or who shall inhabit in or about Our said Castle of Windsor or the Towns thereunto adjacent or the Liberties Precincts or Territories thereof that they and every of them be from time to time aiding helping and assisting unto the said XX during Our Pleasure in all things for or concerning the due execution of the said Offices or the safeguard of Our said Castle of Windsor as they tender Our Pleasure and will answer the contrary at their utmost peril In Witness whereof We have caused these Our Letters to be made Patent Witness Ourselves at Westminster the XX day of XX in the XX year of Our Reign

=== British Armed Forces ===
- Defence Council
- Judge Advocate General

==== Royal Navy ====
Lord High Admiral: one of the Great Officers of State, the Lord High Admiral is the ceremonial head of the Royal Navy. The office has been held by various members of the Royal Family, and before the establishment of the Defence Council, by the Admiralty in commission: there would be a First Lord of the Admiralty with all other members being referred to as Lord Commissioners of the Admiralty.

Letters patent appointing the Commissioners for executing the Office of Lord High Admiral
Charles the Third by the Grace of God of the United Kingdom of Great Britain and Northern Ireland and of Our other Realms and Territories King Head of the Commonwealth Defender of the Faith To XX Greeting Whereas We did by Our Letters Patent under the Great Seal of Our United Kingdom bearing date at XX the XX day of XX in the XX year of Our Reign constitute and appoint the persons therein named to be Our Commissioners for executing the office of Our High Admiral as therein mentioned during Our pleasure Now Know Ye that We do by these presents revoke the said Letters Patent And further know ye that We trusting in your wisdom and fidelity of Our especial grace do by these presents constitute and appoint you to be Our Commissioners for executing the office of Our High Admiral of Our United Kingdom and of the Territories thereunto belonging and of Our High Admiral of Our Colonies and other dominions whatsoever during Our pleasure Granting unto you or any two or more of you full power and authority to do everything which belongs to the office of Our High Admiral as Well in and touching those things which concern Our Navy and Shipping as in and touching those which concern the rights and jurisdictions appertaining to the office of Our High Admiral And We do grant unto you or any two or more of you full power and authority to make orders for building repairing preserving fitting furnishing arming victualling and setting forth such Ships Vessels and Fleets with all things belonging to them as to you or any two or more of you according to your best discretion shall seem fit; and also to establish and direct such entertainments wages and rewards for and unto all such persons as are employed in any of Our services under you or in anything appertaining thereunto and to give such discharges for those services or any of them as to you or any two or more of you with the consent of the Commissioners of Our Treasury in all cases where such consent has heretofore been required shall seem fit And We do command all Our Officers of Our Navy and all others in any Department of Our Naval Service that they be from time to time attendant to you and do observe and execute all such orders as you or any two or more of you give touching Our Naval Service And Our will and pleasure is that you or any two or more of you do from time to time propound unto Us such ways and means for the establishing such orders and instructions for regulating Our Navy as shall be found agreeable to Our Service and as may increase Our power and forces by sea and remove such defects and abuses as may prejudice the same and especially may keep the Mariners in good order and obedience to the end that thereupon We may take speedy and effectual course for the supplying of all defects and reforming of all abuses And whereas all wrecks of the sea goods and ships taken from pirates and divers rights duties and privileges have been by express words or otherwise heretofore granted to Our High Admirals for their own benefit as duties appertaining to the office of Our High Admiral It is Our will and pleasure that all casual duties and profits be taken and received in all places where they shall happen by the officers of the Admiralty or other proper officers appointed as by law required in that behalf in such sort as they formerly Were or ought to have been taken and received when there was a High Admiral or as they now are or ought to be taken and received; and the officers so taking or receiving the same shall account for the same and every part thereof to the proper officers appointed in that behalf and the same shall be applied in such manner as the law directs And whereas all offices places and employments belonging to the Navy or Admiralty are properly in the trust and disposal of Our High Admiral and Our High Admirals have constituted Vice-Admirals under them Now Our will and pleasure is that all such officers places and employments as shall become or be made void during the vacancy of the office of Our High Admiral shall be given and disposed of by you or any two or more of you And you or any two or more of you may constitute Vice-Admirals for such places where Vice-Admirals have been usually appointed by Our High Admiral for the time being or where you may in your discretion from time to time think fit And know ye further that We do grant unto you full power and authority from time to time by warrants under the hands of any two or more of you and the seal of the office of Admiralty to appoint such officers for conducting the business of the Civil Departments of Our Naval Service and for superintending Our Naval Arsenals Dockyards Victualling Establishments and Naval Hospitals within Our United Kingdom or elsewhere as to you shall seem necessary and from time to time as you shall see fitting to revoke the appointments of any such officers and appoint others in their stead strictly enjoining all such officers and all others whom it may concern to be obedient to you in all things as becometh And moreover We grant unto you or any two or more of you full power and authority to make or cause to be made on Our behalf all requisite contracts for the hire of vessels and for the supply of Naval Medical and Chirurgical Stores and of victuals provisions and other necessaries for Our Fleets and Naval Service and for the performance of works in relation thereto and for any other services as in your discretion shall be from time to time found necessary for the better carrying on of Our Naval Service; and generally to execute and do every power and thing which formerly did in any respect appertain to the office or duties of Principal Officers and Commissioners of the Navy and of Commissioners for Victualling the Navy and for the care of sick and wounded seamen in the Service or which they or any of them collectively or individually as such officers and Commissioners could have lawfully executed or done In Witness whereof We have caused these Our Letters to be made Patent Witness Ourself at Westminster the XX day of XX in the XX year of Our Reign

Vice Admiral: is a flag officer rank of the Royal Navy, immediately superior to the rear admiral rank and subordinate to the admiral rank.

Rear Admiral: is a flag officer rank of the Royal Navy, immediately superior to commodore and subordinate to vice admiral.

=== Knighthoods ===
Powers to confer knighthood – General: Knighthoods are usually conferred for public service, and entitle the grantee to the prefix "Sir" to their forenames, and their wives to the prefix "Lady" to their surnames.

Letters patent conferring a knighthood
Charles the Third by the Grace of God of the United Kingdom of Great Britain and Northern Ireland and of Our other Realms and Territories King Head of the Commonwealth Defender of the Faith To all to whom these Presents shall come Greeting Now Know Ye that by these Presents We have been pleased to nominate and appoint Our trusty and well beloved XX to the degree title honour and dignity of a Knight Bachelor together with all right precedences privileges and advantages to the same degree title honour and dignity belonging or appertaining In Witness whereof We have caused these Our Letters to be made Patent Witness Ourself at Westminster on the XX day of XX in the XX year of Our Reign

Powers to confer knighthood – Double: The King, during any absence from the United Kingdom or otherwise absence from a particular investiture, may delegate the powers to confer knighthoods to a Counsellor of State, and these letters patent are issued for that purpose, as applicable.

Letters patent granting powers to confer a knighthood
Charles the Third by the Grace of God of the United Kingdom of Great Britain and Northern Ireland and of Our other Realms and Territories King Head of the Commonwealth Defender of the Faith To XX Greeting Whereas We are desirous of conferring upon you XX certain powers to act on Our behalf on the XX and XX days of XX and the XX and XX days of XX when We cannot Ourself conveniently be personally present Know Ye that We by these Presents Do direct and empower you XX to confer on the aforesaid days in Our Name and on Our behalf in as full and ample a manner as if the same had been conferred by Us in person the title degree and honour of a Knight Bachelor upon such persons as We have signified at the date of these Presents Our intention of promoting or appointing to be Members of the First or Second Class of Our Most Honourable Order of the Bath or of Our Most Distinguished Order of Saint Michael and Saint George or of Our Royal Victorian Order or of Our Most Excellent Order of the British Empire and as under special Warrant issued under the Seal of any of the said Orders you XX have been empowered to invest with the insignia of the First or Second Class of that Order And also to confer in Our Name and on Our behalf upon such persons as We have been pleased to approve the title degree and honour of a Knight Bachelor together with all rights privileges and precedences appertaining thereto in as full and ample a manner as if the same had been conferred by Us in person In Witness whereof We have caused these Our Letters to be made Patent Witness Ourself at Westminster on the XX day of XX in the XX year of Our Reign

Removal of a knighthood: Knighthoods may be removed if the grantee has committed a crime or has otherwise defamed the very reason he was knighted in the first place. This procedure is similar to the one used when removing membership to an order of chivalry.

Letters patent removing a knighthood
Charles the Third by the Grace of God of the United Kingdom of Great Britain and Northern Ireland and of Our other Realms and Territories King Head of the Commonwealth Defender of the Faith To all who to these Presents shall come Whereas on the XX day of XX Two thousand and XX We of Our especial grace and favour conferred the honour of Knighthood upon XX as a Knight Bachelor Now Know Ye that We of Our certain knowledge and mere motion do hereby cancel and annul the Knighthood conferred upon the said XX as a Knight Bachelor together with all rights precedences privileges and advantages to the same degree title honour and dignity belonging or appertaining thereto In Witness whereof We have caused these Our Letters to be made Patent Witness Ourself at Westminster on the XX day of XX in the XX year of Our Reign

Powers to confer knighthood on individuals whilst overseas: The King may confer on an individual the power to knight an individual whilst overseas.

Letters patent conferring the power to knight an individual overseas
Charles the Third by the Grace of God of the United Kingdom of Great Britain and Northern Ireland and of Our other Realms and Territories King Head of the Commonwealth Defender of the Faith To [person being empowered] Greeting Know Ye that We do by these Presents direct and empower you Our said [person being empowered] on the [day] day of [month] [year] in [country] to confer in Our name and upon Our behalf in as full and ample a manner as if the same had been conferred by Us in person the title degree and honour of a [the rank of honour being conferred, e.g. knight bachelor, knight commander of the Order of the British Empire, etc] upon [person being knighted] together with all rights precedences privileges and advantages appertaining thereto In Witness whereof We have caused these Our Letters to be made Patent Witness Ourself at Westminster on the [day] day of [month] in the [regnal year] year of Our Reign

- Powers to confer knighthood – High Court judge

=== Universities ===
- Professor of the Greek Tongue
- Regius Professor of Ecclesiastical History

==== Cambridge ====
- Master of Churchill College
- Master of Trinity College
- Regius Professor of Civil Law
- Regius Professor of Physic
- Regius Professor of Hebrew

==== Oxford ====
- Professor or Reader of Civil Law
- Regius Professor of Medicine
- Regius Professor of Divinity

Regius Professor of Hebrew

Letters patent appointing the Regius Professor of Hebrew (Oxford)
Charles the Third by the Grace of God of the United Kingdom of Great Britain and Northern Ireland and of Our other Realms and Territories King Head of the Commonwealth Defender of the Faith To all to whom these Presents shall come Greeting Know Ye that We of Our especial grace certain knowledge and mere motion have given and granted and by these Presents for Us Our heirs and successors Do give and grant unto Our trusty and well beloved XX the Office and Place of Regius Professor of Hebrew Tongue in Our University of Oxford being void by the resignation of Our trusty and well beloved XX and in Our Gift in full right To have and to hold the Office of Regius Professor aforesaid unto him the said XX for and during Our Pleasure together with all and singular the right and advantages whatsoever to the same Office belonging or appertaining subject nevertheless to all such statutes decrees ordinances rules regulations touching or concerning the said Office and the duties thereof In Witness whereof We have caused these Our Letters to be made Patent Witness Ourself at Westminster on the XX day of XX in the XX year of Our Reign
