= Elizabeth Butler-Sloss, Baroness Butler-Sloss =

English judge (born 1933)

The Right Honourable The Baroness Butler-Sloss GBE, PC
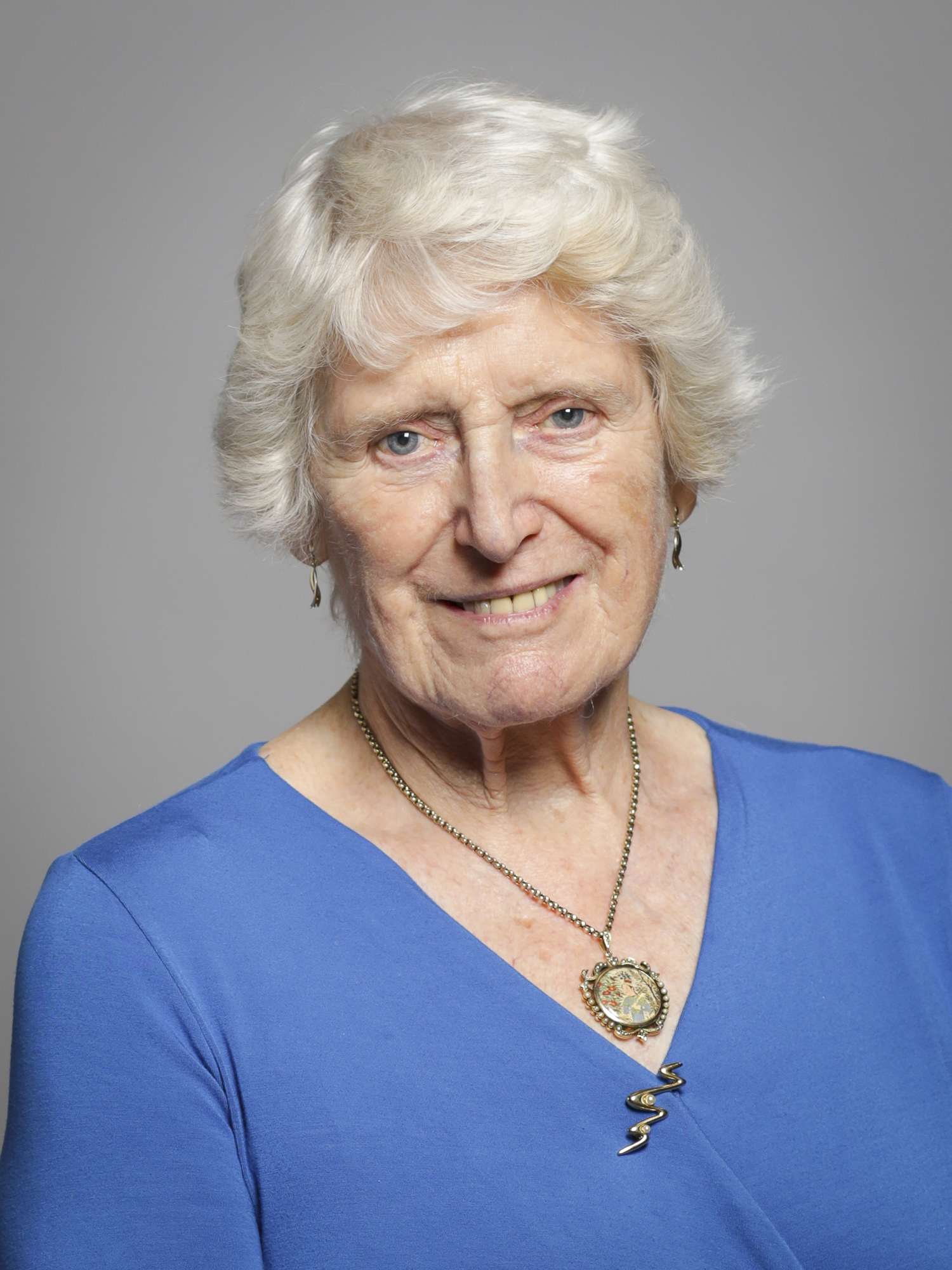
- Official portrait, 2019

Member of the House of Lords
- Lord Temporal
- Life peerage 13 June 2006

President of the Family Division
- In office 1999 – April 2005

Lord Justice of Appeal
- In office 1988–1999
- Succeeded by: Sir Mark Potter

Judge of the High Court
- In office 1979–1988

Personal details
- Born: Ann Elizabeth Oldfield Havers; 10 August 1933 (age 93) Buckinghamshire, England
- Party: None (crossbencher)
- Other political affiliations: Conservative Party (1950s)
- Spouse: Joseph William Alexander Butler-Sloss (m. 1958)
- Relations: Lord Havers (brother); Nigel Havers (nephew)
- Children: 3
- Parent: Sir Cecil Havers (father)

Ann Elizabeth Oldfield Butler-Sloss, Baroness Butler-Sloss, (née Havers; born 10 August 1933) is a retired English judge. She was the first female Lord Justice of Appeal and was the highest-ranking female judge in the United Kingdom until 2004, when Baroness Hale was appointed to the House of Lords. Until June 2007, she chaired the inquests into the deaths of Diana, Princess of Wales, and Dodi Fayed. She stood down from that task with effect from that date, and the inquest was conducted by Lord Justice Scott Baker.

== Early life ==
Butler-Sloss was born on 10 August 1933 to Sir Cecil Havers, a barrister (later a judge), and Enid Flo Havers (née Snelling). She was sister to Michael Havers, Baron Havers, a Conservative Lord Chancellor, and is aunt to his sons, the actor Nigel Havers and the barrister Philip Havers KC. She was educated at Broomfield House School in Kew, in West London, and Wycombe Abbey School, an all-girls independent boarding school in High Wycombe in Buckinghamshire. This was followed by a year at the University of Lausanne. She passed the bar without a university degree.

Butler-Sloss stood as the Conservative candidate for Vauxhall in the 1958 London County Council election, and the equivalent constituency in the 1959 general election, where she won 38% of the vote, but was defeated by the Labour MP George Strauss.

== Career ==
=== Legal career ===
Butler-Sloss was called to the Bar from the Inner Temple in February 1955. In 1970 she was appointed a Registrar of the Principal Probate Registry (the predecessor to the Principal Registry of the Family Division). In 1979, she became the fourth woman to be appointed a High Court judge, after Elizabeth Lane, Rose Heilbron, and Margaret Booth. As were all previous female High Court judges, she was assigned to the Family Division. As per tradition, she was also made a Dame Commander of the Order of the British Empire (DBE).

In 1988, Butler-Sloss became the first woman appointed as a Lord Justice of Appeal (judge of the Court of Appeal), having chaired the Cleveland child abuse inquiry in the previous year. In 1999, she became President of the Family Division of the High Court of Justice, the first woman to hold this position and the highest-ranking woman judge in the United Kingdom until Brenda Hale became the first female Lord of Appeal in Ordinary, in January 2004. She was known officially as "Lord Justice Butler-Sloss" until Bingham MR issued a practice direction in 1994 to refer to her informally as "Lady Justice Butler-Sloss"; the official title in s2(3) of the Senior Courts Act 1981 was amended by the Courts Act 2003.

Butler-Sloss was advanced to the rank of Dame Grand Cross of the Most Excellent Order of the British Empire (GBE) in the 2005 New Year Honours. On 12 January 2005, it was announced that she was retiring, being replaced as President of the Family Division by Sir Mark Potter, then a Lord Justice of Appeal.

On 4 August 2006, Butler-Sloss was appointed to the Court of Ecclesiastical Causes Reserved for a period of five years.

On 7 September 2006, Butler-Sloss was appointed as Deputy Coroner of the Queen's Household and Assistant Deputy Coroner for Surrey for the purpose of hearing the inquest into the death of Diana, Princess of Wales. On 2 March 2007, she was appointed as Assistant Deputy Coroner for Inner West London for the purpose of transferring the jurisdiction of the inquest to Inner West London so that the proceedings may sit in the Royal Courts of Justice. On 24 April 2007, she announced she was stepping down in June 2007, saying she lacked the experience required to deal with an inquest with a jury. The role of coroner for the inquests was transferred to Lord Justice Scott Baker. This had been preceded by the overturning by the High Court of her earlier decision to hold the inquest without a jury.

On 8 July 2014, it was announced that Butler-Sloss would chair the forthcoming large-scale inquiry into cases of child sex abuse in previous decades. She stood down on 14 July after mounting pressure from victims' groups and MPs over her suitability regarding the fact that her brother was the Attorney General at the time of some of the abuses in question and her perceived unwillingness to include mention of former Anglican bishop Peter Ball.

=== House of Lords ===
On 3 May 2006, it was announced by the House of Lords Appointments Commission that Butler-Sloss would be one of seven new life peers – so-called "people's peers". She was created Baroness Butler-Sloss, of Marsh Green in the County of Devon, on 13 June 2006. She sits in the House of Lords as a crossbencher. She made her maiden speech on 21 November 2006 during the Debate on the Address on that year's Queen's Speech.

Butler-Sloss has been active in the House of Lords, and served as a member of a number of committees. She was formerly a member of the Merits of Statutory Instruments Committee (2007–2012). She has been a member of the Ecclesiastical Committee, a Joint committee of the Parliament of the United Kingdom, since 2010 and has served as its chair since June 2020. She has been a member of the Procedure and Privileges Committee, a select committee of the House of Lords since January 2023.

=== Other work ===
Butler-Sloss became Chancellor of the University of the West of England in 1993 and an honorary fellow of St Hilda's College, Oxford, Peterhouse, Cambridge, Corpus Christi College, Cambridge, King's College London, the Royal College of Physicians, the Royal College of Psychiatrists and the Royal College of Paediatrics and Child Health. She sits on the Selection Panel for King's Counsel. In December 2004, she was awarded an Honorary Doctor of Laws degree from the University of Bath and in June 2005 she was awarded an honorary degree from The Open University as Doctor of the University. She was Chairman of the Security Commission prior to its abolition in 2010.

== Personal life ==
Butler-Sloss married her husband, Joseph William Alexander Butler-Sloss, in 1958. The marriage produced three children.

Butler-Sloss is a church-going Anglican. In 2002, she chaired the Crown Appointments Committee charged with the selection of a new Archbishop of Canterbury. She was Chairman of the Advisory Council of St Paul's Cathedral from 2000 to 2009 and currently serves as Chair for the Commission on Religion and Belief in British Public Life. As of 2015, she lives in East Devon.

== Notable judgments ==
- Joyce v Sengupta and Another: CA 31 Jul [1992] – Newspaper can be sued for malicious falsehood
- Re T (Consent to Medical Treatment)(Adult Patient) [1993] Fam. 95
- Re W, Re A, Re B (Change of Name) [1999] EWCA Civ 2030
- Re J (Specific Issue Orders: Child's Religious Upbringing and Circumcision) [2000] 1 FLR 571 CA
- An NHS Trust A v M and An NHS Trust B v H [2001] Fam 348
- Re B (Consent to Treatment: Capacity) [2002] EWHC 429

== Arms ==
Coat of arms of Elizabeth Butler-Sloss, Baroness Butler-Sloss
Escutcheon Sable a pelican in her piety Or vulned Gules between three chess rooks Or. Motto Try To Anticipate

Baroness Butler-Sloss' arms are a version of the arms borne by her brother, Michael Havers, Baron Havers.

== See also ==
- Ms B v An NHS Hospital Trust

Academic offices
Preceded by	Chancellor of the University of the West of England; 1993–2011	Succeeded by Sir Ian Carruthers
Legal offices
Preceded by Sir Stephen Brown	President of the Family Division; 1999–2005	Succeeded by Sir Mark Potter
