= Court for Divorce and Matrimonial Causes =

UK court for marital disputes (1857–1875)

In the history of the courts of England and Wales, the Court for Divorce and Matrimonial Causes was created by the Matrimonial Causes Act 1857, which transferred the jurisdiction of the ecclesiastical courts in matters matrimonial to the new court so created.

The Judge Ordinary of the Court for Divorce and Matrimonial Causes also presided over the Court of Probate, but the two courts remained separate entities.

On 1 November 1875, under the Supreme Court of Judicature Act 1873 and the Supreme Court of Judicature Act 1875, the Judge Ordinary of the Court for Divorce and Matrimonial Causes was transferred, as its President, to the Probate, Divorce and Admiralty Division of the High Court of Justice.

== Judges ordinary of the Court for Divorce and Matrimonial Causes ==
- 11 January 1858: Sir Cresswell Cresswell
- 3 September 1863: Sir James Plaisted Wilde (ennobled as Lord Penzance from 6 April 1869)
- 20 November 1872: Sir James Hannen
