= Professor of Greek =

Professor of Greek may refer to any university professor in ancient Greek, including the holders of the following professorial chairs:

- Gladstone Professor of Greek, at the University of Liverpool
- MacDowell Professor of Greek, at the University of Glasgow
- Professor of Greek (University College London), at University College London
- Professor of Greek at the University of Edinburgh, position abolished and merged into the Professor of Classics (Edinburgh) in 1987
- Regius Professor of Greek (Cambridge), at the University of Cambridge
- Regius Professor of Greek (Oxford), at the University of Oxford
- Regius Professor of Greek (Dublin), at Trinity College Dublin
- Regius Professor of Greek at the University of Aberdeen, position abolished and merged with the Regius Professor of Humanity in 1979

== See also ==
- Regius Professor of Greek (disambiguation)
