= James Hannen, Baron Hannen =

English judge and vegetarian (1821–1894)

The Right Honourable The Lord Hannen PC FRS
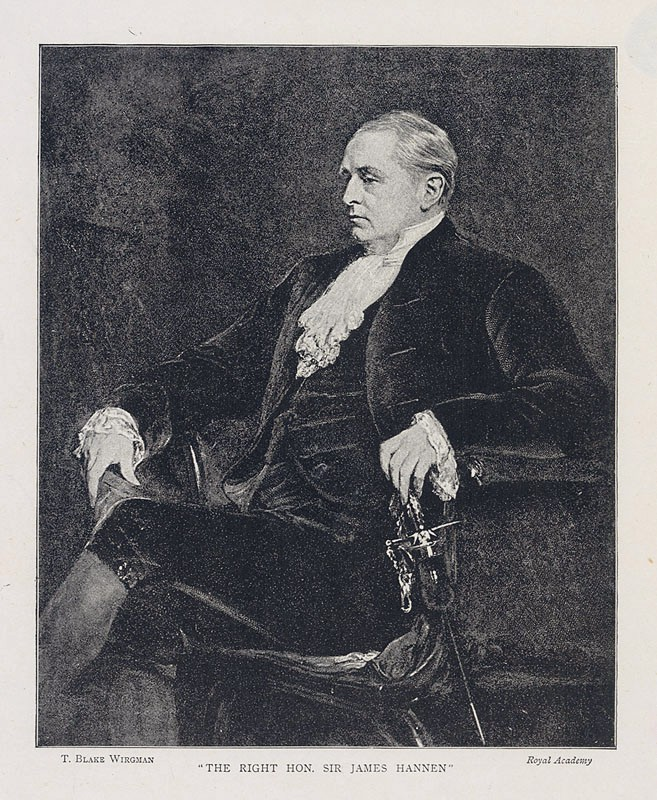

Lord of Appeal in Ordinary
- In office 28 January 1891 – 15 August 1893

President of the Probate, Divorce and Admiralty Division
- In office 1 November 1875 – 28 January 1891
- Preceded by: Office created
- Succeeded by: Sir Charles Butt

Judge of the Court of Probate and Judge Ordinary of the Court for Divorce and Matrimonial Causes
- In office 20 November 1872 – 1 November 1875

Justice of the Queen's Bench
- In office 25 February 1868 – 20 November 1872
- Born: 19 March 1821; Peckham, London
- Died: 29 March 1894 (aged 73)
- Resting place: West Norwood Cemetery
- Education: St Paul's School
- Alma mater: Heidelberg University
- Relatives: Nicholas Hannen (brother); Nicholas Hannen (nephew)

James Hannen, Baron Hannen, PC, FRS (19 March 1821 – 29 March 1894) was an English barrister and judge.

== Biography ==
Son of a London merchant, he was born at Peckham. He was educated at St Paul's School and at Heidelberg University, which was famous as a school of law. Called to the bar at the Middle Temple in 1848, he joined the home circuit. At this time, he also wrote for the press, and supplied special reports for the Morning Chronicle. Though not eloquent in speech, he was clear, accurate and painstaking, and soon advanced in his profession, passing many more brilliant competitors. He appeared for the claimant in the Shrewsbury peerage case in 1858, when Henry Chetwynd-Talbot, 3rd Earl Talbot was declared to be entitled to the earldom of Shrewsbury as the descendant of John Talbot, 2nd Earl of Shrewsbury; was principal agent for the United Kingdom on the mixed British and American commission for the settlement of outstanding claims, 1853–1855; and assisted in the prosecution of the Fenian prisoners at Manchester.

In 1868, Hannen was appointed a judge of the Court of Queen's Bench. In many cases he took a strong position of his own, notably in that of Farrar v. Close (1869), which materially affected the legal status of trade unions and was regarded by unionists as a severe blow to their interests. Hannen became judge of the Court of Probate and Court for Divorce and Matrimonial Causes in 1872. By virtue of being the Probate Judge, he became President of the Probate, Divorce and Admiralty Division by operation of the Judicature Acts when three courts became part of the new High Court of Justice. Here he showed himself a worthy successor to Cresswell Cresswell and Lord Penzance.

Many important causes came before him, but he will chiefly be remembered for the manner in which he presided over the Parnell special commission. His influence pervaded the whole proceedings, and it is understood that he personally penned a large part of the voluminous report. Hannen's last public service was in connection with the Bering Sea inquiry at Paris, when he acted as one of the British arbitrators. In January 1891 he was appointed a Lord of Appeal in Ordinary with the dignity of a life peerage as Baron Hannen, of Burdock in the County of Sussex, but in that capacity he had few opportunities for displaying his powers, and he retired at the close of the session of 1893.

== Personal life ==
He was elected a Fellow of the Royal Society in March 1891. He died in London, after a prolonged illness, on 29 March 1894 and is interred in the catacombs of West Norwood Cemetery

He was the elder brother of Sir Nicholas John Hannen who was Chief Justice of the British Supreme Court for China and Japan from 1891 to 1900 and concurrently British Consul General at Shanghai from 1891 to 1898. Nicholas Hannen also served as the Judge of the British Court for Japan from 1881 to 1891. His son Henry Arthur, born 1861, was formally educated and became a justice of the peace lived in Smiths Hall in West Farleigh & was married.

Hannen had a bladder stone removed and suffered from hyperuricemia. He was advised by his surgeon to take up a vegetarian diet which he did for the rest of his life. Hannen was Vice-President of the London Vegetarian Society.
