= George Baker (judge) =

British judge (1910–1984)

Sir George Gillespie Baker, OBE, PC (25 April 1910 – 13 June 1984) was President of the Family Division (formerly of the Probate, Divorce and Admiralty Division) of the High Court of Justice from 1971 to 1979 and a Judge in the Division from 1961 to 1979.

He also served as Assistant Adjutant General on the British War Crimes Executive at the Nuremberg Trials from 1945 to 1946.

== Biography ==
George Gillespie Baker was educated at Glasgow Academy; Strathallan School, Perthshire and Brasenose College, Oxford (Hon. Scholarship; Senator Hulme Scholar), where he later became an Honorary Fellow. He received a Call to the bar by the Middle Temple in 1932 and would in later life become Treasurer of the Inn in 1976. At the beginning of the Second World War Baker joined the army and after a brief spell in the Queen's Own Royal West Kent Regiment he was commissioned in the Cameronians (Scottish Rifles) in 1940.

Baker served as Deputy Assistant Adjutant General at the War Office 1941–1942, Assistant Adjutant General with the Allied Force Headquarters 1942–44, Colonel 'A' 15th Army Group, 1945 and Assistant Adjutant General on the British War Crimes Executive at the Nuremberg Trials in 1945–1946. In 1945 he unsuccessfully contested the Southall (UK Parliament constituency) in the 1945 United Kingdom general election as a Conservative candidate.

After the war Baker resumed his career at the Bar, mostly on the then Oxford Circuit. He was Recorder in turn of Bridgnorth (1946-1951), Smethwick (1951-1952) and Wolverhampton (1952-1961). Appointed a Queen's Counsel in 1952, Deputy Chairman of the Shropshire Quarter Sessions from 1954 until 1971 and Leader of the Oxford Circuit for seven years until his promotion to a High Court Judge in 1961. Baker's deep personal integrity was founded on his staunch Presbyterian faith.

== Honours/Awards ==
- Appointed an Officer of the Most Excellent Order of the British Empire, 1945.
- Appointed a Knight Bachelor in 1961.
- Appointed a Privy Counsellor of the Privy Council of the United Kingdom in 1971.
- Honorary Member Canadian Bar Association.
- Freedom of the City of London, 1981.

Legal offices
Preceded by Sir Jocelyn Simon	President of the Family Division; 1971–1979	Succeeded by Sir John Arnold
