= Mark Potter (judge) =

English judge

The Right Honourable Sir Mark Potter FKC

President of the Family Division
- In office 7 April 2005 – 5 April 2010
- Nominated by: Gordon Brown
- Appointed by: Elizabeth II
- Preceded by: Dame Elizabeth Butler-Sloss
- Succeeded by: Sir Nicholas Wall

Personal details
- Born: 27 August 1937 (age 89)
- Education: University of Cambridge

Sir Mark Howard Potter, PC FKC (born 27 August 1937) is a retired English judge who was President of the Family Division and Head of Family Justice for England and Wales from 2005 to 2010.

Now retired, he remains a Fellow of King's College London.

== Education ==
A son of Professor Harold Potter, an academic lawyer, Potter attended The Perse School, Cambridge, and then read law at Gonville and Caius College, Cambridge. He is now an Honorary Fellow of Caius.

== Legal career ==
Potter was called to the bar in 1961 and practised in commercial law in the chambers of Alan Orr QC then at 2, Crown Office Row, later relocated to become Fountain Court Chambers. He took silk in 1980.

From 1988 to 1996 he was a judge of the High Court of Justice, Queen's Bench Division and from 1991 to 1994 he was a Presiding Judge on the Northern Circuit. Potter was appointed a Lord Justice of Appeal in 1996 and became President of the Family Division in April 2005. Throughout his judicial career, Potter sat on various committees overseeing the direction of the Bar. He was Chairman of the Lord Chancellor's Advisory Committee on Legal Education and Conduct (1998–1999) and Chairman of the Legal Services Consultative Panel.

Potter was elected Treasurer of Gray's Inn for the year 2004/05.

Potter retired as a judge of the Court of Appeal, President of the High Court Family Division and President of the Court of Protection in April 2010. He returned to the field of commercial Law as an arbitrator at Fountain Court chambers, with appointments in areas such as insurance, international share purchase agreements including Bermuda form and energy disputes.

== Cases and administration ==
In July 2006, Potter ruled against Celia Kitzinger and Sue Wilkinson, a lesbian couple who had married in Canada, in their case to have their same-sex partnership recognised as marriage under English law.

Potter held that, in withholding from same-sex partnerships the title and status of marriage, Parliament had not interfered with or failed to recognise the right of same-sex couples to respect for their private or family life; nor had it discriminated against same-sex couples in declining to alter the deep-rooted and almost universal recognition of marriage as a union between a man and woman. He granted permission to appeal; but no appeal was brought.

In 2009, following a government consultation on increasing transparency in the family courts system, Potter presided over the implementation of new rules allowing media access to family proceedings, hitherto private and confidential, subject to certain restrictions.

== Life ==
Potter was a Trustee of Somerset House in London, and also of Great Ormond Street Hospital for children. He is married and has two sons.

Legal offices
Preceded by Dame Elizabeth Butler-Sloss	President of the Family Division; 2005–2010	Succeeded by Sir Nicholas Wall
