= Nicholas Wall (judge) =

English judge (1945-2017)

The Right Honourable Sir Nicholas Wall
- Wall in 2012

President of the Family Division
- In office 13 April 2010 – 1 December 2012
- Nominated by: Gordon Brown
- Appointed by: Elizabeth II
- Preceded by: Sir Mark Potter
- Succeeded by: Sir James Munby

Personal details
- Born: Nicholas Peter Rathbone Wall; 14 March 1945
- Died: 17 February 2017 (aged 71)
- Education: Trinity College, Cambridge

Sir Nicholas Peter Rathbone Wall, PC (14 March 1945 – 17 February 2017) was an English judge who was President of the Family Division and Head of Family Justice for England and Wales.

== Early life ==
Nicholas Wall was born in Clapham on 14 March 1945, the son of Frederick, a director of Stanley Gibbons, and Mimi (née Woods). He won a London County Council scholarship to Dulwich College, an independent day and boarding school for boys in Dulwich in South London, followed by an Exhibition to Trinity College, Cambridge, where he read English and then Law and was president of the Union.

== Legal career ==
Wall was called to the bar (Gray's Inn) in 1969 and was made a Bencher in 1993. He became a Queen's Counsel and was appointed an Assistant Recorder in 1988. He became a Recorder in 1990. He was appointed to the Family Division of the High Court on 20 April 1993, receiving the customary knighthood. Wall was a Judge of the Employment Appeal Tribunal (2001–2003) and the Administrative Court (2003–2004). He was promoted to the Court of Appeal on 12 January 2004 and consequently made a Privy Counsellor.

Wall was nominated to be President of the Family Division by the appointments panel, but the Lord Chancellor, Jack Straw, asked them to reconsider. The panel once again put Wall forward, and he was subsequently appointed to the position on 13 April 2010. Wall retired on 1 December 2012 for health reasons.

According to Straw, he "simply judged that he would not be competent to do the job", based on his own experience with him.

== Death ==
Wall died on 17 February 2017. His family stated that he had recently been diagnosed with frontotemporal dementia, and had taken his own life.
