= John Arnold (judge) =

Sir John Lewis Arnold (May 6, 1915 – October 9, 2004) was a British judge. He was President of the Family Division of the High Court of Justice from 1979 to 1988.

== Biography ==
Arnold was educated Wellington College and University of Würzburg. He was called to the Bar by the Middle Temple in 1937. He became a tenant of Wilfred Hunt's chambers shortly before the outbreak of the Second World War, when he joined the Royal Artillery as a gunner. He was later commissioned and served in northwest Europe as an intelligence officer with 11th Armoured Division, then the 52nd Division Headquarters. He was severely wounded in Bremen in 1945. The same year, he was mentioned in despatches.

After the war, Arnold practiced at the Chancery bar. He became a Queen's Counsel in 1958.

Legal offices
Preceded by Sir George Baker	President of the Family Division; 1979–1988	Succeeded by Sir Stephen Brown
