= Marsh Green =

Marsh Green may refer to:

- Marsh Green, Devon, in England
- Marsh Green, Kent, in England
- Marsh Green, East Sussex, in England
- Marsh Green, Isle of Wight, in England
- Marsh Green, Wigan, in England
