= Stephen Brown (judge) =

British judge (1924–2025)

The Right Honourable Sir Stephen Brown GBE

President of the Family Division
- In office 1988–1999
- Preceded by: Sir John Arnold
- Succeeded by: Dame Elizabeth Butler-Sloss

Personal details
- Born: 3 October 1924 Staffordshire, England
- Died: 1 October 2025 (aged 100)
- Spouse: Patricia Ann Good (m. 1951)
- Children: 5
- Education: Queens' College, Cambridge
- Occupation: Judge

Military service
- Allegiance: United Kingdom
- Branch: Royal Navy
- Service years: 1943–1946
- Rank: Lieutenant
- Unit: Royal Navy Volunteer Reserve

Sir Stephen Brown (3 October 1924 – 1 October 2025) was a British judge. He was a Lord Justice of Appeal and the President of the Family Division of the High Court of England and Wales.

== Early life and education ==
Brown was born in Staffordshire, England, on 3 October 1924 to Wilfrid Brown and Nora Elizabeth Brown of Longdon Green. He was educated at Malvern College and Queens' College, Cambridge.

== Career ==
From 1943 to 1946 Brown served in the Royal Navy Volunteer Reserve as a lieutenant.

Brown became a barrister at the Inner Temple in 1949, became a bencher in 1974, and became Treasurer in 1994. He was Deputy Chairman of Staffordshire Quarter Sessions from 1963 to 1971, and Recorder of West Bromwich from 1965 to 1971. He was appointed Queen's Counsel in 1966. He was a Recorder, and Honorary Recorder of West Bromwich from 1972 to 1975, was a High Court judge, in the Family Division, from 1975 to 1977, and in the Queen's Bench Division from 1977 to 1983, and was Presiding Judge of the Midland and Oxford Circuit from 1977 to 1981.

Brown became a Privy Counsellor in 1983 and was appointed a Lord Justice of Appeal (1983–88) and finally became President of the Family Division (1988–99) of the High Court of England and Wales. On 19 November 1992, he delivered the landmark ruling that doctors treating Tony Bland, who had been in a persistent vegetative state since suffering serious brain damage in the Hillsborough disaster more than three years earlier, could withdraw food and treatment keeping him alive. Treatment was ultimately withdrawn on 22 February 1993, after the House of Lords rejected an appeal by the Official Solicitor, and Mr Bland died on 3 March 1993.

He was a member of the Parole Board of England and Wales from 1967 to 1971, of the Butler Committee on mentally abnormal offenders from 1972 to 1975, and of the Advisory Council on Penal System in 1977. He was chairman of the Advisory Committee on Conscientious Objectors from 1971 to 1975. He was chairman of the Council of Malvern College from 1976 to 1994.

As of 10 January 2009, he was also a member of the Advisory Committee of Children's Rights International.

== Personal life and death ==
In 1951, Brown married Patricia Ann Good, daughter of Richard Good from Tenbury Wells, Worcestershire. They had twin sons and three daughters. They lived in Harborne, Birmingham, until Patricia died in January 2020. Brown died on 1 October 2025, at the age of 100.

== Honours and decorations ==
Brown was knighted in 1975. Brown was appointed a Knight Grand Cross of the Order of the British Empire (GBE) in the 1999 Birthday Honours "for services to the Family Court System."

He received an honorary fellowship and several honorary degrees:

- Honorary Fellow: Queens' College, Cambridge, 1984
- Honorary LLD: University of Birmingham, 1985
- Honorary LLD: University of Leicester, 1997
- Honorary LLD, Honorary FRC Psychology: University of the West of England, 2000.

Legal offices
| Preceded by Sir John Arnold | President of the Family Division; 1988–1999 | Succeeded by Dame Elizabeth Butler-Sloss |
