= James Munby =

English judge (1948–2026)

The Right Honourable Sir James Munby
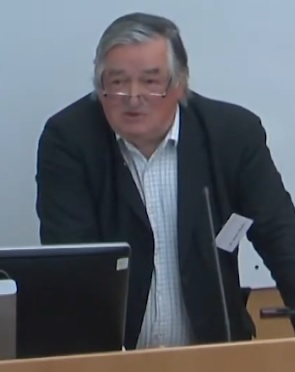
- Munby in 2019

President of the Family Division
- In office 11 January 2013 – 27 July 2018
- Preceded by: Sir Nicholas Wall
- Succeeded by: Sir Andrew McFarlane

Lord Justice of Appeal
- In office 12 October 2009 – 11 January 2013
- Nominated by: Gordon Brown, as Prime Minister
- Appointed by: Elizabeth II

Personal details
- Born: James Lawrence Munby; 27 July 1948 Oxford, England
- Died: 1 January 2026 (aged 77)
- Education: Magdalen College School
- Alma mater: Wadham College, Oxford

Sir James Lawrence Munby (27 July 1948 – 1 January 2026) was an English judge who was President of the Family Division of the High Court of England and Wales. He was replaced by Sir Andrew McFarlane on reaching the mandatory retirement age.

== Early life ==
Munby was born in Oxford on 27 July 1948. He was educated at Magdalen College School, Oxford and Wadham College, Oxford, where he was an Honorary Fellow. He was also an Eldon Scholarship winner.

== Legal career ==
Munby was called to the bar at Middle Temple in 1971 and practised as a barrister at New Square Chambers. He was appointed Queen's Counsel in 1988 and as a High Court Judge on 2 October 2000, assigned to the Family Division and authorised to sit in the Administrative Court.

He was appointed Chairman of the Law Commission on 1 August 2009, replacing Lord Justice Etherton.

On 12 October of that year, he was appointed a Lord Justice of Appeal, receiving the customary appointment to the Privy Council. His term as Chairman of the Law Commission expired in August 2012. On 11 January 2013, he succeeded Sir Nicholas Wall as President of the Family Division.

Munby was the presiding judge when Charles Spencer, 9th Earl Spencer divorced his second wife, Carolyn Freud. The Earl's barrister Nicholas Mostyn advised his client that the case could be heard in private, which Munby rejected. The Earl was upset at the final settlement and unsuccessfully sued Mostyn.

He instituted procedural changes which from January 2016 led to hearings in the Court of Protection being open to the public, save where a judge decides otherwise.

== Death ==
Munby died from a heart attack on 1 January 2026, aged 77.
