= Andrew McFarlane (judge) =

British judge

The Right Honourable Sir Andrew McFarlane
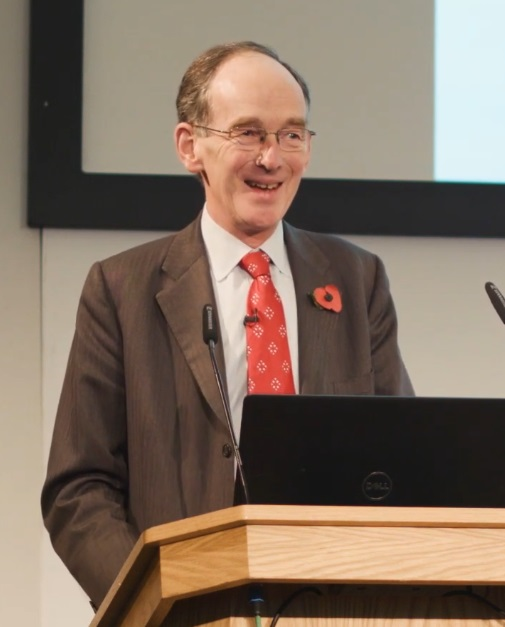
- McFarlane in 2018

President of the Family Division
- In office 27 July 2018 – 13 April 2026
- Monarchs: Elizabeth II; Charles III
- Preceded by: Sir James Munby
- Succeeded by: Sir Stephen Cobb

Lord Justice of Appeal
- In office 28 July 2011 – 27 July 2018

Personal details
- Born: 20 June 1954 (age 72)
- Education: Collingwood College, Durham University

Sir Andrew Ewart McFarlane PC (born 20 June 1954) is a British retired judge who served as President of the Family Division from 2018 to 2026. He was previously a Lord Justice of Appeal in England and Wales from 2011 to 2018.

== Early life and education ==
McFarlane was brought up in Solihull, West Midlands, before moving to Crosby, Merseyside. He was educated at Shrewsbury School and studied law at Collingwood College, Durham, and graduated in 1975. He was an early member of Durham University Sensible Thespians (later renamed The Durham Revue), a sketch comedy group founded in 1973.

== Legal career ==
McFarlane was called to the bar at Gray's Inn in 1977 and has been a Bencher since 2003. He began his pupillage in London at chancery chambers before moving to 2 Fountain Court in Birmingham (now St Philips Chambers). While there, he and David Hershman wrote Hershman and McFarlane: Children Law and Practice. He then moved to 1 King's Bench Walk in Temple, London in 1994. In 1998, he became a Queen's Counsel.

He was appointed an Assistant Recorder in 1995, a Recorder in 1999 and a deputy High Court Judge in 2000. He was appointed as a judge of the High Court of Justice on 18 April 2005 and assigned to the Family Division, receiving the customary knighthood. McFarlane was the Family Division Liaison Judge for the Midland Circuit from 2006 until his appointment as a Lord Justice of Appeal on 28 July 2011, whereupon he received the customary appointment to the Privy Council. On 28 July 2018, he was appointed President of the Family Division.

He was, until January 2019, the President of Tribunals and Chair of the Clergy Discipline Commission of the Church of England under the Clergy Discipline Measure 2003.

In 2021, McFarlane ordered that the will of Prince Philip, Duke of Edinburgh would be sealed for at least 90 years. The original will and its envelope, alongside at least thirty others belonging to various members of the Royal Family now deceased, are stored in a safe and retained in the custody of the President of the Family Division.
