= Stephen Cobb (judge) =

British judge

The Right Honourable Sir Stephen Cobb
- Royal coat of arms of the United Kingdom

President of the Family Division
- Incumbent
- Assumed office 23 April 2026
- Monarch: Charles III
- Preceded by: Sir Andrew McFarlane

Lord Justice of Appeal
- In office 1 July 2025 – 23 April 2026

Justice of the High Court
- In office 11 January 2013 – 30 June 2025

Personal details
- Born: 12 April 1962 (age 64)
- Education: Winchester College
- Alma mater: University of Liverpool

Sir Stephen William Scott Cobb (born 12 April 1962) is an English judge who has served as the President of the Family Division since 2026. He was a High Court judge from 2013 to 2025 and a Lord Justice of Appeal from 2025 to 2026.

== Career ==
Cobb is the son of the former High Court judge Sir John Francis Scott Cobb. He was educated at Winchester College and graduated from the University of Liverpool with a degree in law in 1984. He received an honorary doctorate from his alma mater in 2019.

He was called to the bar at the Inner Temple in 1985. In 2003, he was appointed Queen's Counsel and in 2004 was appointed a Recorder. In December 2012, he was appointed a High Court judge with effect from 11 January 2013. He was assigned to the Family Division and received the customary knighthood in the 2013 Special Honours.

Cobb was appointed a Lord Justice of Appeal on 12 June 2024, and took his place in July 2025. He was appointed to the Privy Council on 12 November 2025.

He was appointed President of the Family Division in May 2026.

Cobb was the Chairman of the Family Law Bar Association for two years from 2010 to 2011. In 2012 he was awarded the Family Law QC (as it then was) of the year prize at the Jordan Publishing's Family Law Awards.

== Notable judgments ==
In 2015, sitting in the Court of Protection, he ruled that a woman with six children and an IQ of 70 should be sterilized because another pregnancy would be a "significantly life-threatening event" for her and the foetus due to her having a very thin uterus.
