= Ms B v An NHS Hospital Trust =

English legal case concerning end of life

Ms B v An NHS Hospital Trust [2002] EWHC 429 (Fam) is a decision of the English High Court of Justice which ruled that if a patient is mentally competent, they have the right to refuse life saving medical treatment.

== Facts ==
The case arose from a challenge by 'Ms B', who had become paralysed from the neck down after a spinal haemorrhage, to the hospital caring for her after doctors refused her requests to be taken off the ventilator that was keeping her alive. Ms B had previously suffered a haemorrhage on her spine, for which she was successfully rehabilitated, and was advised that any future haemorrhaging would likely cause severe disability. Because of that advice, Ms B took out a living will stating that if she were to ever be unable to give instructions, she would want any medical treatment withdrawn in the case of a life-threatening illness, permanent mental impairment or permanent unconsciousness. Despite the existence of the living will, Ms B's doctors denied her request to be removed from ventilation claiming the living will was too vague, after which she made a formal request through her solicitor. Before acting on the formal request, the hospital organised two independent psychiatric assessments of Ms B. She eventually underwent multiple assessments over five months due to the conflicting opinions of psychiatrists. After finally being declared mentally competent, Ms B was not granted her wish to be removed from ventilation but was instead given two alternative options: slow weaning from the ventilator without pain relief or being sent to a hospice, both of which she refused. Ms B's request was then taken to the High Court of Justice's Family Division for a decision. Following the court's decision in her favour, Ms B was moved to a hospital that removed her from ventilation, where she died on 29 April 2002.

== Judgement ==
In her judgement, Elizabeth Butler-Sloss ruled that she was 'entirely satisfied that Ms B is competent to make all relevant decisions about her medical treatment including the decision whether to seek to withdraw from artificial ventilation. Her mental competence is commensurate with the gravity of the decision she may wish to make.' She also ruled that Ms B had been treated unlawfully by the hospital since the time she had been assessed as mentally competent. The judgement cited contributing factors to unlawful treatment were the inability of hospital staff to consider Ms B's request objectively; offering her treatments that prioritised doctors and clinicians over Ms B; the Hospital Trust not providing guidance for staff for deciding ethical issues.

== Other cases ==
The announcement of Ms B's death came on the same day a woman paralysed from the neck down from advanced motor neuron disease, Diane Pretty, lost a legal battle in the European Court of Human Rights for the right to die with the help of her husband. Despite the difference between Ms B seeking removal of treatment and Diane Pretty seeking assisted suicide, the similarities between the cases sparked public debate about inconsistencies in the law regarding the right to die.
