= Court of Probate =

UK court for disputes over wills and testaments (1857–1875)

In the history of the courts of England and Wales, the Court of Probate was created by the Court of Probate Act 1857, which transferred the jurisdiction of the ecclesiastical courts in testamentary matters to the new court so created.

The Judge of the Court of Probate also presided over the Court for Divorce and Matrimonial Causes, but the two courts remained separate entities.

On 1 November 1875, under the Supreme Court of Judicature Act 1873 and the Supreme Court of Judicature Act 1875, the Judge of the Court of Probate was transferred, as its President, to the Probate, Divorce and Admiralty Division of the High Court of Justice.

== Judges of the Court of Probate ==
- 11 January 1858: Sir Cresswell Cresswell
- 3 September 1863: Sir James Plaisted Wilde (from 6 April 1869, Lord Penzance)
- 20 November 1872: Sir James Hannen
