= Regius Professor of Greek =

Regius Professor of Greek may refer to:

- Regius Professor of Greek (Cambridge), at the University of Cambridge (founded 1540)
- Regius Professor of Greek (Oxford), at the University of Oxford (founded 1546)
- Regius Professor of Greek (Dublin), at Trinity College Dublin (founded 1761)
- Regius Professor of Greek at the University of Aberdeen, position abolished and merged with the Regius Professor of Humanity in 1979
