= Marsh Green, Devon =

Village in Devon, England

Marsh Green
- Village
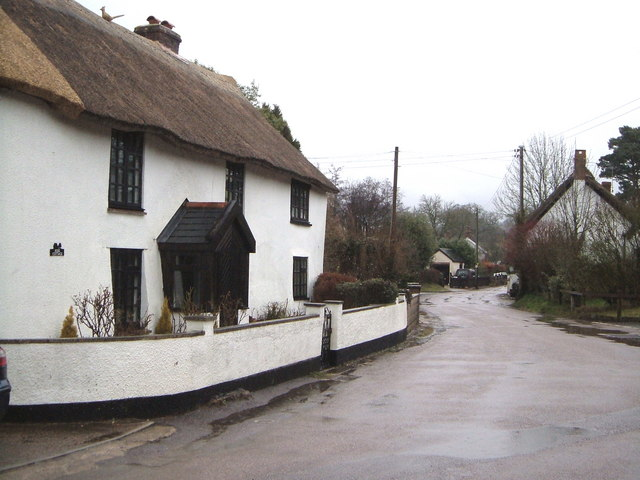

- Location within Devon Location within the United Kingdom
- Coordinates: 50.735°N 3.359°W
- Country: England
- County: Devon
- Time zone: UTC+0:00 (GST)

Marsh Green is a small rural community in East Devon, England. Following a protracted battle, planning permission for a 60,000-panel solar farm in Marsh Green was approved by the Planning Inspectorate in November 2023.
