= President of the Family Division =

Member of the High Court of Justice of England and Wales

The President of the Family Division is the head of the Family Division of the High Court of Justice in England and Wales and head of Family Justice. The Family Division was created in 1971 when Admiralty and contentious probate cases were removed from its predecessor, the Probate, Divorce and Admiralty Division.

The current President is Sir Stephen Cobb.

== Presidents of the Probate, Divorce and Admiralty Division ==
- 1 November 1875: Sir James Hannen (Note: As the Judge of the Court of Probate, Hannen became the president of the division by virtue of section 31 of the Supreme Court of Judicature Act 1873 on 1 November 1875.)
- 29 January 1891: Sir Charles Butt (Note: Under the Judicature Acts as then in effect, Butt, as the senior judge in the Division, automatically became President of the Division when Hannen was appointed a Lord of Appeal in Ordinary on 29 January. The law was changed by the Supreme Court of Judicature Act 1891, which made the office one appointed by the Crown.)
- 2 June 1892: Sir Francis Jeune
- 30 January 1905: Sir Gorell Barnes
- 10 February 1909: Sir John Bigham
- 9 March 1910: Sir Samuel Evans
- 18 October 1918: Sir William Pickford (The Lord Sterndale from November 1918)
- 31 October 1919: Sir Henry Duke (The Lord Merrivale from 1925)
- 2 October 1933: Sir Boyd Merriman (The Lord Merriman from 1941)
- 8 February 1962: Sir Jocelyn Simon (The Lord Simon of Glaisdale from February 1971)
- 20 April 1971: Sir George Baker (President of the Family Division after the relevant provisions of the Administration of Justice Act 1970 came into force on 1 October 1971)

== Presidents of the Family Division ==
- 1 October 1971: Sir George Baker (President of the Probate, Divorce and Admiralty Division before the relevant provisions of the Administration of Justice Act 1970 came into force on 1 October 1971)
- 28 September 1979: Sir John Arnold
- 11 January 1988: Sir Stephen Brown
- 1 October 1999: Dame Elizabeth Butler-Sloss
- 7 April 2005: Sir Mark Potter
- 13 April 2010: Sir Nicholas Wall (Retired 1 December 2012)
- 11 January 2013: Sir James Munby
- 28 July 2018: Sir Andrew McFarlane (Retired 13 April 2026)
- 23 April 2026: Sir Stephen Cobb

== Legal significance ==
When someone died intestate (that is, without having made a valid will), their property used to legally vest with the President of the Family Division until a grant of administration was made in favour of the deceased's personal representatives. Since 1994 the property instead vests with the Public Trustee until the grant is made.

== See also ==
- Lord Chief Justice
- Master of the Rolls
- President of the King's Bench Division
- Chancellor of the High Court
