= High Court of Justice =

One of the Senior Courts of England and Wales

High Court of Justice in London
- Royal coat of arms of the United Kingdom
- Established: 1 November 1875; 151 years ago
- Jurisdiction: England and Wales
- Location: Strand, London, WC2
- Authorised by: Statute: Supreme Court of Judicature Act 1873; Supreme Court of Judicature Act 1875; Supreme Court of Judicature Act 1877; Supreme Court of Judicature Act 1891; Criminal Appeal Act 1907; Supreme Court of Judicature (Consolidation) Act 1925; Supreme Court of Judicature (Amendment) Act 1935; Supreme Court of Judicature (Amendment) Act 1938; Supreme Court of Judicature (Amendment) Act 1944; Supreme Court of Judicature (Amendment) Act 1959; Senior Courts Act 1981; Constitutional Reform Act 2005
- Appeals to: Court of Appeal; Supreme Court; Judicial Committee of the Privy Council
- Website: judiciary.uk/highcourt

The High Court of Justice (Welsh: Uchel Lys Cyfiawnder), formally known as His Majesty's High Court of Justice in England, together with the Court of Appeal and the Crown Court, is one of the Senior Courts of England and Wales. Its name is abbreviated as EWHC (England and Wales High Court) for legal citation purposes.

The High Court deals at first instance with all high-value and high-importance civil law (non-criminal) cases; it also has a supervisory jurisdiction over all subordinate courts and tribunals, with a few statutory exceptions, though there are debates as to whether these exceptions are effective.

The High Court consists of three divisions: the King's Bench Division, the Business and Property Division (formerly the Chancery Division) and the Family Division. Their jurisdictions overlap in some cases, and cases started in one division may be transferred by court order to another where appropriate. The differences of procedure and practice between divisions are partly historical, derived from the separate courts which were merged into the single High Court by the 19th-century Judicature Acts, but are mainly driven by the usual nature of their work, for example, conflicting evidence of fact is quite commonly given in person in the King's Bench Division, but evidence by affidavit is more usual in the Chancery Division which is primarily concerned with points of law.

Most High Court proceedings are heard by a single judge, but certain kinds of proceedings, especially in the King's Bench Division, are assigned to a divisional court—a bench of two or more judges. Exceptionally the court may sit with a jury, but in practice normally only in defamation cases or cases against the police. Litigants are normally represented by counsel but may be represented by solicitors qualified to hold a right of audience, or they may act in person.

In principle, the High Court is bound by its own previous decisions, but there are conflicting authorities as to what extent this is so. Appeal from the High Court in civil matters normally lies to the Court of Appeal, and thence in cases of importance to the Supreme Court (the House of Lords before 2009); in some cases a "leapfrog" appeal may be made directly to the Supreme Court. In criminal matters, appeals from the King's Bench Divisional Court are made directly to the Supreme Court.

The High Court is based at the Royal Courts of Justice on the Strand in the City of Westminster, London. It has district registries across England and Wales; almost all High Court proceedings may be issued and heard at a district registry.

== History ==
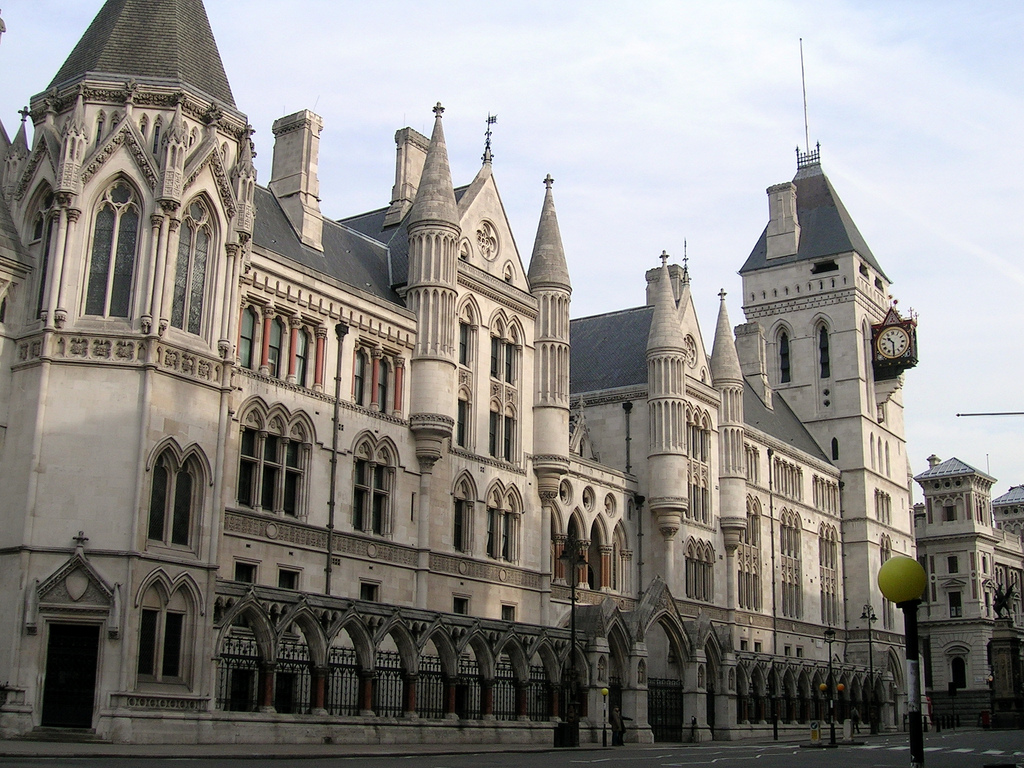
The Royal Courts of Justice on the Strand in the City of Westminster

The High Court of Justice was established in 1875 by the Supreme Court of Judicature Act 1873. The Act merged eight existing English courts – the Court of Chancery, the Court of King's Bench, the Court of Common Pleas, the Court of Exchequer, the High Court of Admiralty, the Court of Probate, the Court for Divorce and Matrimonial Causes, and the London Court of Bankruptcy – into a new Supreme Court of Judicature (now known as the Senior Courts of England and Wales). The new Supreme Court was divided into the Court of Appeal, which exercised appellate jurisdiction, and the High Court, which exercised original jurisdiction.

== Divisions ==
Originally, the High Court consisted of five divisions, the King's Bench, Common Pleas, Exchequer, Chancery, and Probate, Divorce and Admiralty divisions. In 1880, the Common Pleas and Exchequer divisions were abolished, leaving three divisions. The Probate, Divorce and Admiralty Division was renamed to the Family Division by the Administration of Justice Act 1970, and its jurisdiction reorganised accordingly. The High Court is now organised into three divisions: the King's Bench Division, the Chancery Division, and the Family Division. A list of hearings in the High Court's divisions is published daily.

=== King's Bench Division ===
The King's Bench Division (KBD) – or Queen's Bench Division when the monarch is female – hears a wide range of common law cases and also has special responsibility as a supervisory court. It includes subdivisions such as the Administrative Court, the Commercial Court, the Technology and Construction Court, and the Admiralty Court.

A Royal Commission was appointed in 1934 in order to address concerns about delays within the King's Bench Division and to determine whether any reforms would help to alleviate the problems then being experienced. Its chair was Lord Peel.

Until 2005, the Lord Chief Justice of England and Wales was the head of the Division. The Constitutional Reform Act 2005 created a President of the Queen's Bench Division.

=== Chancery Division ===
The Chancery Division (housed in the Rolls Building) deals with business law, trusts law, probate law, insolvency, and land law in relation to issues of equity. It has specialist courts (the Patents Court and the Companies Court) which deal with patents and registered designs and company law matters respectively. All tax appeals are assigned to the Chancery Division.

Until 2005, the Lord Chancellor was the de jure head of the Chancery Division, but appointed a Vice-Chancellor who nominally acted as his deputy. The Constitutional Reform Act 2005 renamed the Vice-Chancellor to Chancellor of the High Court and made him the head of the Division.

Cases heard before the Chancery Division are reported in the Chancery Division law reports. In practice, there is some overlap of jurisdiction with the KBD.

From October 2015, the Chancery Division and the Commercial Court have maintained the Financial List for cases which would benefit from being heard by judges with suitable expertise and experience in the financial markets or which raise issues of general importance to the financial markets. The procedure was introduced to enable fast, efficient and high quality dispute resolution of claims related to the financial markets.

It was announced on 2 June 2026 that the Chancery Division would be replaced by the Business and Property Division, and the title of Chancellor of the High Court would be renamed the President of the Business and Property Division. The Business and Property Division came into effect on 1 October 2026.

==== Business and Property Courts ====
The formation within the High Court of the Business and Property Courts of England and Wales was announced in March 2017, and launched in London in July 2017. The courts would in future administer the specialist jurisdictions previously administered in the King's Bench Division under the names of the Admiralty Court, the Commercial Court, and the Technology and Construction Court, and in the Chancery Division under the lists for business, company and insolvency law, competition, finance, intellectual property, revenue, and trusts and probate. These courts are located at the Rolls Building in central London, and in District Registries located in Birmingham, Bristol, Cardiff, Manchester, Liverpool, Leeds and Newcastle.

The change was intended to enable judges who have suitable expertise and experience in the specialist business and property jurisdictions to be cross-deployed to sit in the specialist courts, while continuing existing practices for cases that proceed in them.

The renamed Business and Property Division will comprise all the specialist jurisdictions currently comprised in the Business and Property Courts.

=== Family Division ===
The Family Division deals with personal human matters such as divorce, children, probate and medical treatment. Its decisions are often of great importance only to the parties, but may concern life and death and are perhaps inevitably regarded as controversial. For example, it permitted a hospital to separate conjoined twins without the parents' consent. In 2002 it made a landmark judgement in the case of Ms B v An NHS Hospital Trust regarding the right of mentally competent patients to withdraw from life-saving treatment. The Family Division exercises jurisdiction to hear all cases relating to children's welfare, and has an exclusive jurisdiction in wardship cases. Its head is the President of the Family Division, currently vacant since the retirement of Sir Andrew McFarlane on 16 April 2026. High Court Judges of the Family Division sit at the Royal Courts of Justice, Strand, London, while District Judges of the Family Division sit at First Avenue House, Holborn, London.

The Family Division is comparatively modern. The Judicature Acts first combined the Court of Probate, the Court for Divorce and Matrimonial Causes and the High Court of Admiralty into the then Probate, Divorce and Admiralty Division of the High Court, or The Court of Wills, Wives and Wrecks, as it was informally called. That was renamed the Family Division in 1971 when the admiralty and contentious probate business were transferred elsewhere.

The Family Division has faced criticism by allowing allegedly abusive partners to cross-examine their former partners; a procedure already banned in criminal procedure. Peter Kyle, MP for Hove, claimed this amounted to "abuse and brutalisation", and called for the system to be changed. Liz Truss, when she was Lord Chancellor, announced plans to end this practice, and proposals were contained in Clause 47 of the Prisons and Courts Bill before Parliament was prorogued for the 2017 general election. This practice, with the passing of the Domestic Abuse Act 2021, was officially prohibited in 2022 for both family and civil proceedings, under which section 65 of the act amended the Matrimonial and Family Proceedings Act 1984 to prohibit the cross-examination of victims of parties in a family proceeding, whether they be witnesses or parties of the proceeding.

== Sittings ==
The High Court only operates within four traditional periods in the year, known as sittings:

- Michaelmas: 1 October to 21 December
- Hilary: 11 January to the Wednesday before Easter
- Easter: the second Tuesday after Easter to the Friday before the Spring bank holiday (last Monday in May)
- Trinity: the second Tuesday after the spring holiday to 31 July

== Judges ==
The Justices of His Majesty's High Court of Justice are informally known as High Court judges, and in judicial matters are formally styled "The Honourable Mr(s) Justice (Forename) Surname", abbreviated in writing to "Surname J". In court, they are properly addressed as My Lord or My Lady. Since by convention they are knighted upon appointment, socially they are addressed as Sir Forename or Dame Forename. High Court judges are sometimes referred to as red judges after the colour of their formal robes, in contrast to the junior circuit judges who are referred to as purple judges for the same reason.

Masters (also judges in the High Court) are addressed as 'Master', regardless of gender, or 'Judge' and they wear dark blue gowns with pink tabs echoing the red of the High Court justices' robes. Within the Chancery Division of the High Court, there are also Insolvency and Companies Court Judges, who hear the majority of High Court insolvency (both personal and corporate) and company law cases and trials, together with some appeals from the County Court. They too wear dark blue gowns with pink tabs and are addressed as 'Judge' in court.

Justices of the High Court, Insolvency and Companies Court Judges and Masters are appointed by the King on the recommendation of Judicial Appointments Commission, from qualified lawyers. The Lord Chancellor, and all government ministers, are statutorily required to "uphold the continued independence of the judiciary", and both Houses of Parliament have standing orders to similar effect. High Court justices may be removed before their statutory retirement age only by a procedure requiring the approval of both Houses of Parliament.

In addition to full High Court justices, other qualified persons such as retired judges, circuit judges from the County Court, and barristers are appointed to sit as deputy judges of the High Court to hear particular cases, and while sitting are addressed as though they were full High Court judges. Trials in London are also conducted by Insolvency and Companies Court Judges and Masters, who have almost identical trial jurisdiction to full High Court judges but who do not hear committals to prison, criminal cases, or judicial review and do not travel 'on circuit' to outlying courts.

High Court justices (usually from the King's Bench Division) also sit in the Crown Court, which try the more significant criminal cases, but High Court Judges only hear the most serious and important cases, with circuit judges and recorders hearing the majority.

== Circuits and district registries ==
Historically the ultimate source of all justice in England was the monarch. All judges sit in judgment on the monarch's behalf (hence they have the royal coat of arms displayed behind them) and criminal prosecutions are generally made in the monarch's name. Historically, local magnates administered justice in manorial courts and other ways. Inevitably, the justice administered was patchy and appeals were made direct to the monarch. The monarch's travelling representatives (whose primary purpose was tax collection) acted on behalf of the monarch to make the administration of justice more even.

The tradition continues of judges travelling around the country in set 'circuits', where they hear cases in the 'district registries' of the High Court. The 'main' High Court (in the City of Westminster, London) is not itself a High Court district registry.

The High Court previously divided England and Wales into six circuits namely the Midlands, Northern England, North Eastern England, South Eastern England, Wales (including Cheshire), and Western England. Since 2005, the High Court has used seven circuits, listed below, which are identical to the Crown Court regions.

- London, consisting of the Greater London region.
- Midlands, consisting of the East Midlands and West Midlands regions, plus North East Lincolnshire and North Lincolnshire.
- North East England, consisting of the North East England and Yorkshire and the Humber regions, minus North East Lincolnshire and North Lincolnshire.
- North West England, consisting of the North West England region.
- South East England, consisting of the East of England and South East England regions, minus Hampshire and the Isle of Wight.
- South West England, consisting of the South West England region, plus Hampshire and the Isle of Wight.
- Wales, consisting of all of Wales.

== Costs Office ==
The Senior Courts Costs Office, which quantifies legal costs pursuant to orders for costs, serves all divisions. The Costs Office is part of the High Court, so generally all detailed assessment proceedings commenced in the Costs Office are subject to provisional assessment. Exceptions from provisional assessment are detailed assessment proceedings in which the costs claimed are large (greater than £75,000) or in which the potential paying party does not respond to the notice of assessment.

== See also ==
- High Court enforcement officer

== Bibliography ==
- Williams, Glanville Llewellyn; Smith, A.T.H. (27 July 2010). Learning the Law. Sweet & Maxwell. ISBN 978-0-414-04173-8.
