= 2014 Special Honours =

British government recognitions

As part of the British honours system, the Special Honours are issued at the Queen's pleasure at any given time. The Special Honours refer to the awards of the Order of the Garter, Order of the Thistle, Order of Merit, Royal Victorian Order and the Order of St John. Life Peerages are at times also awarded as special honours.

== Life Peer ==
=== Conservative Party ===
- Michael Farmer, to be Baron Farmer, of Bishopsgate in the City of London – 5 September 2014
- Ranbir Singh Suri, to be Baron Suri, of Ealing in the London Borough of Ealing – 11 September 2014
- Natalie Jessica Evans, to be Baroness Evans of Bowes Park, of Bowes Park in the London Borough of Haringey – 12 September 2014
- The Hon. Diana Mary Harding, to be Baroness Harding of Winscombe, of Nether Compton in the County of Dorset – 15 September 2014
- The Hon. Caroline Elizabeth Chisholm, to be Baroness Chisholm of Owlpen, of Owlpen in the County of Gloucestershire – 16 September 2014
- Joanna Shields, OBE to be Baroness Shields, of Maida Vale in the City of Westminster – 16 September 2014
- Sir Stuart Rose, to be Baron Rose of Monewden, of Monewden in the County of Suffolk – 17 September 2014
- Andrew Timothy Cooper, to be Baron Cooper of Windrush, of Chipping Norton in the County of Oxfordshire – 17 September 2014
- Nosheena Shaheen Mobarik, CBE to be Baroness Mobarik, of Mearns in the County of Renfrewshire – 23 September 2014
- Arminka Helic, to be Baroness Helic, of Millbank in the City of Westminster – 23 September 2014
- Karren Brady, CBE to be Baroness Brady, of Knightsbridge in the City of Westminster – 25 September 2014
- Martin Callanan, to be Baron Callanan, of Low Fell in the County of Tyne and Wear – 26 September 2014

=== Labour Party ===
- Dame Gail Rebuck, DBE to be Baroness Rebuck, of Bloomsbury in the London Borough of Camden – 23 September 2014
- Christopher John Lennie, to be Baron Lennie, of Longsands Tynemouth in the County of Tyne and Wear – 25 September 2014
- Michael Cashman, CBE to be Baron Cashman, of Limehouse in the London Borough of Tower Hamlets – 26 September 2014

=== Liberal Democrat Party ===
- Christopher Francis Fox, to be Baron Fox, of Leominster in the County of Herefordshire – 11 September 2014
- Julie Smith, to be Baroness Smith of Newnham, of Crosby in the County of Merseyside – 12 September 2014
- David Goddard, to be Baron Goddard of Stockport, of Stockport in the County of Greater Manchester – 15 September 2014
- Paul Scriven, to be Baron Scriven, of Mearns in the County of Renfrewshire – 23 September 2014
- Barbara Lilian Janke, to be Baroness Janke, of Clifton in the City and County of Bristol – 26 September 2014
- Kathryn Mary Pinnock, to be Baroness Pinnock, of Cleckheaton in the County of West Yorkshire – 26 September 2014

=== Democratic Unionist Party ===
- William Hay, to be Baron Hay of Ballyore, of Ballyore in the City of Londonderry – 18 December 2014

=== Crossbench ===
- General Sir David Richards, GCB CBE DSO ADC Gen to be Baron Richards of Herstmonceux, of Emsworth in the County of Hampshire – 24 February 2014
- Sir Andrew Green, KCMG to be Baron Green of Deddington, of Deddington in the County of Oxfordshire – 2 December 2014
- Sir Jonathan Evans, KCB to be Baron Evans of Weardale, of Toys Hill in the County of Kent – 5 December 2014
- Alison Wolf, CBE to be Baroness Wolf of Dulwich, of Dulwich in the London Borough of Southwark – 5 December 2014
- Sir Robert Rogers, KCB to be Baron Lisvane, of Blakemere in the County of Herefordshire and of Lisvane in the City and County of Cardiff – 15 December 2014

== Most Noble Order of the Garter ==
Order of the Garter ribbon

=== Knight Companion of the Order of the Garter (KG) ===
- The Rt Hon. The Lord King of Lothbury, GBE FBA – 23 April 2014

=== Lady Companion of the Order of the Garter (LG) ===
- The Rt Hon. The Baroness Manningham-Buller, DCB – 23 April 2014

== Order of the Companions of Honour ==
Order of the Companions of Honour ribbon

=== Member of the Order of the Companions of Honour (CH) ===
- The Rt Hon. Kenneth Clarke, QC MP – 8 August 2014

== Knight Bachelor ==
Knight's Bachelor ribbon

- Sir Richard William Ground, OBE – 20 January 2014
- The Hon. Mr Justice James Michael Dingemans – 18 February 2014
- The Hon. Mr Justice Nicholas Nigel Green – 18 February 2014
- The Hon. Mr Justice Anthony Hayden – 18 February 2014
- The Hon. Mr Justice Clive Buckland Lewis – 18 February 2014
- The Hon. Mr Justice Christopher George Nugee – 18 February 2014
- The Hon. Mr Justice Stephen Edmund Phillips – 18 February 2014
- Oliver Heald, QC, MP – 8 August 2014
- The Hon. Mr Justice William Easthope Davis – 4 November 2014
- The Hon. Mr Justice Ian William Dove – 4 November 2014
- The Hon. Mr Justice Andrew Jeremy Coulter Edis – 4 November 2014
- The Hon. Mr Justice James Richard William Goss – 4 November 2014
- The Hon. Mr Justice Robin St.John Knowles – 4 November 2014
- The Hon. Mr Justice Roderick Brian Newton – 4 November 2014
- The Hon. Mr Justice Mark David John Warby – 4 November 2014

== Most Honourable Order of the Bath ==
Order of the Bath ribbon

=== Knight Grand Cross of the Order of the Bath (GCB) ===
Honorary

- François Hollande, President of France – 5 June 2014
- Tony Tan, President of Singapore – 24 October 2014

== Most Distinguished Order of St Michael and St George ==
Order of St Michael and St George ribbon

=== Knight/Dame Grand Cross of the Order of St Michael and St George (GCMG) ===
- Dame Marguerite Matilda Pindling, DCMG, Governor-General of The Bahamas – 7 October 2014
- Rodney Errey Lawrence Williams, Governor General of Antigua and Barbuda – 17 October 2014

Honorary

- Manuel Valls, Prime Minister of France – 5 June 2014

=== Knight Commander of the Order of St Michael and St George (KCMG) ===
- The Rt Hon. Alan Duncan, MP – 22 July 2014
- The Rt Hon. Hugh Robertson, MP – 22 July 2014

Honorary

- Laurent Fabius, Minister of Foreign Affairs of France – 5 June 2014
- Laurent Stefanini, Ambassador, Chief of Protocol to President François Hollande – 5 June 2014

=== Dame Commander of the Order of St Michael and St George (DCMG) ===
Honorary

- Angelina Jolie, For services to UK foreign policy and the campaign to end warzone sexual violence – 14 June 2014
- Grace Fu, Minister, Prime Minister’s Office, Second Minister for the Environment and Water Resources and Second Minister for Foreign Affairs of Singapore – 21 October 2024

=== Companion of the Order of St Michael and St George (CMG) ===
Honorary

- Despina Zernioti, For services to UK/Greek relations and to the Order of St Michael and St George – 1 April 2014
- Paul Jean Ortiz, Diplomatic Advisor to the President of France – 5 June 2014
- Pierre Sellal, Secretary General, Ministry of Foreign Affairs of France – 5 June 2014
- Philippe Leglise-Costa, Deputy Diplomatic Advisor to the President of France – 5 June 2014
- Jonathan Lacote, Deputy Head of Mission, French Embassy, London – 5 June 2014
- Simon Wong, Deputy Secretary, Ministry of Foreign Affairs of Singapore – 21 October 2024
- Dominic Goh, Director-General, Ministry of Foreign Affairs of Singapore – 21 October 2024
- Michael Tan, Chief of Protocol of Singapore – 21 October 2024

== Royal Victorian Order ==
Royal Victorian Order ribbon

=== Knight Grand Cross of the Royal Victorian Order (GCVO) ===
- Sir Peter Ricketts GCMG – 30 June 2014

=== Knight Commander of the Royal Victorian Order (KCVO) ===
- Julian King CMG, CVO – 4 July 2014
- The Very Rev Gilleasbuig Macmillan CVO, on retirement as Chaplain to The Queen in Scotland and Dean of the Order of the Thistle. – 11 July 2014
- Prof. John Cunningham CVO – on retirement as Head of the Medical Household and Physician to The Queen. – 5 August 2014
- Air Marshal Ian Macfadyen CB, OBE – on relinquishment of the appointment of Constable and Governor, Windsor Castle. – 5 August 2014
- The Rt Rev. Christopher Hill – on relinquishing the role of Clerk of the Closet and Head of Her Majesty's College of Chaplains. – 18 November 2014

=== Commander of the Royal Victorian Order (CVO) ===
- Brigadier John Edward Bruce Smedley LVO – on retirement as Private Secretary to The Earl and Countess of Wessex. – 18 March 2014
- Rebecca Lucy Kitteridge – on relinquishing the role of Secretary of the Cabinet and Clerk of the Executive Council in New Zealand. – 31 March 2014
- Sir Paul John James Britton, CB – on retirement as the Prime Minister's Appointments Secretary. – 8 May 2014
- Philip Brian Everett, LVO – on relinquishment of his appointment as Deputy Ranger, Windsor Great Park. – 17 June 2014
- Kara Justine Owen – 30 June 2014
- Euan Werran McDonald Curnow LVO – on retirement as Veterinary Surgeon to the Royal Studs. – 5 August 2014
- George Hassall LVO – on retirement as Director, Royal and Diplomatic Affairs, Jaguar Land Rover. – 5 August 2014
- Major David Rankin-Hunt LVO, MBE, TD – on retirement as Administrator and Assistant to the Surveyors, Royal Collection Trust. – 5 August 2014
- The Rt Hon. Commander The Earl of Rosslyn, QPM – on relinquishing his appointment as Head of Royalty & Specialist Protection Department. – 29 September 2014
- The Reverend Prebendary William Sievwright Scott – on relinquishing the role of Sub-Dean of Her Majesty's Chapels Royal, Sub-Dean and Domestic Chaplain of the Ecclesiastical Household, Deputy Clerk of the Closet and Sub-Almoner.

=== Lieutenant of the Royal Victorian Order (LVO) ===
- Mark Thomas Fraser, OAM, Deputy Official Secretary to the Governor-General of Australia – 26 January 2014
- Sophie Abigail Guelff – 30 June 2014
- Samuel Fitzsimons MVO – 4 July 2014
- Michael Alan Ebbage MVO – on retirement as Accountant, Sandringham Estate. – 11 July 2014
- Jill Elizabeth Kelsey MVO – on relinquishing the role of Deputy Archivist, Royal Archives. – 14 November 2014

=== Member of the Royal Victorian Order (MVO) ===
- William James Frecklington, OAM. For coach building services to The Queen.
- Claire-Anne Haines – 30 June 2014
- Matthew Hallett – 30 June 2014
- Alys Marguerite O'Connor – 30 June 2014
- Captain Shuresh Kumar Thapa, The Royal Gurkha Rifles, on relinquishment of his appointment as Queen's Gurkha Orderly Officer
- Captain Kumar Gurung, 10 Queen's Own Gurkha Logistic Regiment RLC, on relinquishment of his appointment as Queen's Gurkha Orderly Officer
- Sharon Kathleen Gaddes-Croasdale, on relinquishing the role of Florist, Royal Household. – 5 August 2014

== Most Excellent Order of the British Empire ==
Order of the British Empire (Military division) ribbon

Order of the British Empire (Civil division) ribbon

=== Knight Grand Cross of the Order of the British Empire (GBE) ===
Honorary

- Ratan Tata, KBE, For services to UK/India relations, inward investment to the UK and philanthropy

=== Dame Commander of the Order of the British Empire (DBE) ===
- The Hon. Mrs. Justice Geraldine Mary Andrews – 18 February 2014
- The Hon. Mrs. Justice Sue Lascelles Carr – 18 February 2014
- The Hon. Mrs. Justice Frances Silvia Patterson – 18 February 2014
- The Hon. Mrs. Justice Ingrid Ann Simler – 18 February 2014
- The Hon. Mrs. Justice Elisabeth Mary Caroline Laing – 4 November 2014
- The Hon. Mrs. Justice Maura Patricia McGowan – 4 November 2014
- The Hon. Mrs. Justice Jennifer Mary Roberts – 4 November 2014
- The Hon. Mrs. Justice Alison Hunter Russell – 4 November 2014

=== Knight Commander of the Order of the British Empire (KBE) ===
Honorary

- Haruo Naito, For services to Japanese investment in the UK and to Anglo-Japanese relations
- Admiral Édouard Guillaud, For services to the Lancaster House Treaty and UK/France military relations
- Michael Bloomberg, for his "prodigious entrepreneurial and philanthropic endeavors, and the many ways in which they have benefited the United Kingdom and the U.K.-U.S. special relationship."
- John Franklyn Mars, for services to British business and the economy.

=== Commander of the Order of the British Empire (CBE) ===
- Brigadier Duncan Francis Capps
- Brigadier Rupert Timothy Herbert Jones, MBE
- Colonel Robert James Rider
- Brigadier Maurice John Sheen, QVRM TD
- Acting Air Commodore Christopher Edward John Brazier
- Air Commodore Philip James Beach, MBE
- Air Commodore John Drew Maas

Honorary

- Tadakazu Kimura, For services to international sponsorship and Anglo-Japanese cultural understanding
- Heesun Chun, For services to promoting British education in South Korea.
- Michael Ilan Yoel Federmann, For services to UK/Israel business cooperation and UK prosperity.
- Tadakazu Kimura, For services to international sponsorship and Anglo-Japanese cultural understanding.
- Alain Jacques Richard Minc, For services UK/French relations.
- Dervilla Mitchell, For services to engineering.
- Yahya Mohammed Nasib, For services to UK commercial interests in Oman.
- Eli Papouchado, For services to UK/Israel business cooperation and British prosperity.
- Gennady Nikolayevitch Rozhdestvensky, For services to music
- Jose Ignacio Sanchez Galan, For services to the UK energy sector and UK/Spain trade and investment links.
- Dong-bin ShinN, For services to British prosperity.

=== Officer of the Order of the British Empire (OBE) ===
- Surgeon Commander Joanna Mary Elizabeth Leason
- Acting Colonel Simon John Scott, Royal Marines
- Lieutenant Colonel Thomas Howard Bewick, MBE
- Lieutenant Colonel Jason Richard Kerr
- Lieutenant Colonel Jonathan Swift
- Commander Irvine Graham Lindsay

=== Member of the Order of the British Empire (MBE) ===
- Major Richard Charles Morris, Royal Marines
- Acting Major Ross Thomas Boyd
- Major Kieth Anthony Bryan Child
- Major Stephen Philip Dallard
- Captain James Jackson Dear
- Acting Lieutenant Colonel Christopher John Fisher
- Staff Sergeant James Forster
- Captain Euan James Grant
- Major James Andrew Hadfield
- Warrant Officer Class 2 Alan Fraser Hamilton
- Major Rupert Edward Charles Kitching
- Major Gary Robertson
- Major James Samuel Skelton
- Reverend (Wing Commander) Giles Leslie Legood
- Lieutenant Commander Camilla Simpson Meek
- Warrant Officer 2 Engineering Technician (Marine Engineering) Christopher Mullan, QGM
- Wing Commander Graham Ifor August

== Conspicuous Gallantry Cross (CGC) ==
Conspicuous Gallantry Cross ribbon

- Corporal Anthony Stazicker
- Lance Corporal Simon George Moloney, Royal Marines

== Military Cross (MC) ==
Military Cross ribbon

- Major Geoffrey Richard Brocklehurst
- Warrant Officer Class 1 Patrick Hyde
- Private Wesley Robert Masters
- Corporal William Joseph Mills
- Captain Alexander Ryland Pickthall
- Corporal James Richard Lawrence Walker

== Distinguished Flying Cross (DFC) ==
Distinguished Flying Cross ribbon

- Flight Lieutenant Charles Peter Lockyear

== Royal Red Cross ==
Royal Red Cross ribbon

=== Associate of the Royal Red Cross (ARRC) ===
- Major Kerry Jane McFadden-Newman

== Queen's Gallantry Medal (QGM) ==
Queen's Gallantry Medal ribbon

- Captain Michael Robert John Kennedy
- Sergeant Kevin Marc Wright

== Imperial Service Medal (ISM) ==
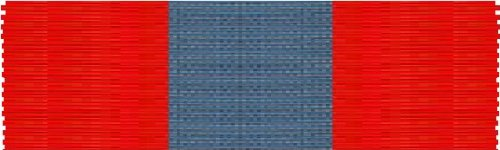
Imperial Service Medal ribbon

- Blazey, Mr Stephen Kevin
- Devoy, Mr Samuel James Donnan
- Doran, Mr Eric
- Drain, Mr Michael Richard
- Foster, Mr Kevin
- Grimason, Mr Albert
- Holt, Mr John Frederick
- Huggins, Mr David Edward
- Kelsall, Mr Richard John
- Lowe, Miss Dionne Kathleen
- Machen, Mr Roger Michael
- Owen, Mr Michael Joseph
- Pink, Mr Dennis Christopher
- Roper, Mrs Sara Anne
- Rowley, Mr George Oliver
- Shelley, Mr Arnot Oswald
- Smith, Mr Ian William
- Smith, Mrs Jean Best
- Van Der Pol, Mrs Christine Muriel
- Waller, Mr Gary
- Doak MBE, Miss Rosalind Wendy
- Aregbesola, Mrs Tolulope
- Frodin, Mrs Carolin
- Lawer, Mr Martyn John
- Oldroyd, Mr Hugh
- Oliver, Mr Roger Graham
- Reay, Mr John
- Stoddart, Mrs Catherine
- Veal, Mrs Joan
- Wilcock, Mrs Helen
- Burke, Mrs Lesley
- Mitchell, Mrs Margaret
- Pugh, Mrs Lynne
- Simpson, Mrs Betty
- Stubbins, Mrs Maria

== Mention in Despatches ==
- Acting Corporal Jonathan Robert McNair, Royal Marines
- Corporal Craig Tucker, Royal Marines
- Acting Corporal Donald Boadu Amoah
- Major Thomas James Armitage
- Sergeant Matthew Lee Baldwin
- Rifleman Rajeev Bhoyraz
- Guardsman Ronan Boyce
- Corporal of Horse Alexander James Cawley
- Major Andrew John Child
- Acting Major Adrian Paul Thomas Clayton
- Lieutenant Alexander Edward Floyd
- Trooper Jake John Foster
- Acting Lance Corporal Christopher James Harris
- Private Alexander Francis Hoar
- Sergeant Richard Charles Kerry
- Sapper James Ieuan McDermott
- Corporal Jonathan Kevin Richards
- Lance Corporal of Horse Kevin John Sedgwick
- Flight Lieutenant Jason Andrew Hunt
- Master Aircrew Robert Sean Sunderland

== Queen's Commendation for Bravery ==
- Corporal Neil Bowness
- Sapper Sean Alexander Alan Cameron
- Lance Corporal Sinead Dodds
- Corporal Conner Ryan Grant
- Lance Corporal Neil Meyer
- Sergeant Saiasi Nuku Vono
- Chief Petty Officer Marine Engineering Mechanic (M) Neil Andrew Halsey
- Leading Seaman (Diver) John Pearson

== Queen's Commendation for Valuable Service ==
Queen's Commendation for Valuable Service insignia

- Lieutenant Commander Lawrence John Dunne, RD
- Staff Sergeant Christopher Anderson
- Lieutenant Colonel Stephen Archer, ARRC
- Lieutenant Colonel Edward Graham St John Brockman
- Captain Kempley McKnight Alexander Buchan-Smith
- Acting Lieutenant Colonel Douglas John Scott Cochran
- Captain Rachael Joanne Cull
- Major Timothy James Jonathan Draper
- Captain Maria Elizabeth Eegan
- Lieutenant Colonel Michael Richard Elviss, MBE
- Captain Jonathan Robert Frankling
- Warrant Officer Class 2 Kevin Stuart Anthony Gahgan
- Corporal Mark Gerald Harris
- Lieutenant Colonel Timothy David How
- Captain Thomas William Johnston-Burt
- Staff Sergeant Adam Landers Marshall
- Major Edward David Lionel Maskell-Pedersen
- Major Gary Allen McGown, MBE
- Colonel Stephen Christopher McMahon, MBE
- Warrant Officer Class 1 Colin Lee Nufer
- Lieutenant Colonel David Robert Orr Ewing, OBE
- Sapper Adam Robert Oxley
- Major Jonathan Anthony Evett Palmer, MBE
- Colonel Andrew William Phillips
- Corporal Aaron Michael Rennie
- Staff Sergeant Clinton Sherratt
- Lieutenant Colonel Paul Terence Tedman
- Lieutenant Colonel Jason Michael Williams
- Lance Corporal Alexander Edwin William Price
- Mrs Lisa Pamela Gardner
- Miss Penny Hughes
- Inspector Danny Johnston May
- Major Grant Paul Abbott, Royal Marines
- Commodore Simon James Ancona
- Lieutenant Karl Ashton
- Chief Petty Officer Air Engineering Technician (M) Derek Ashurst
- Commander Christopher Anthony Godwin
- Chief Petty Officer Engineering Technician (Marine Engineering) David Alan Kennedy
- Lieutenant Commander John Peter Ryan
- Commander Mark Adrian Hudson Wooller
- Major Alexandra Emily Caroline Benn, MBE
- Brigadier Richard Friedrich Patrick Felton, CBE
- Major (now Acting Lieutenant Colonel) Phillip John Fox, MBE
- Captain Harriet Louise Haslam-Greene
- Captain Paul Harvey Keymer
- Lieutenant Colonel Matthew James Patrick Murphy
- Wing Commander Andrew Philip Challen
- Flight Lieutenant David John Clemens
- Wing Commander Charles Scott Donald

== Order of St John ==
Order of St John ribbon

=== Bailiff Grand Cross of the Order of St John ===
- David Patrick Henry Burgess, MBE
- Major General Professor John Hemsley Pearn, AO, RFD
- Low Bin Tick, OBE
- Alfred Marshall Acuff, Jr

=== Knight/Dame of the Order of St John ===
- David Ward Jenkins
- His Excellency General The Honourable Sir Peter Cosgrove, AK, MC
- The Right Honourable The Viscount Brookeborough, Bt DL
- Palmer Clarkson Hamilton
- Norman Kelvin Stoller, CBE DL
- Douglas Lithgow Paul
- Dr Bruce Eldon Spivey
- William Henry Told Jr
- Karen Kay Johnson Pardoe
- Shirley Kingsland Richardson
- Sir John Anthony Swire, CBE
- Sir Henry Egerton Aubrey-Fletcher
- Dr Mok Lai Foo David
- Miss Pamela Jane Willis
- Lieutenant Colonel Clarence Thomas Hogg MBE UD DL
- Major James Richard Kelly
- Alderman Alan Colin Drake Yarrow
- Colonel Christopher John Blunden,
- His Excellency Sir Rodney Williams, GCMG

=== Commander of the Order of St John ===
- Timothy Boughton
- Major Peter John Colyer
- Henry Fetherstonhaugh, OBE
- Robert Stanley Harrison
- Stephen Hughes
- Michael Eric Lambell, JP
- Jonathon Poyner
- Richard Roberts
- Brigadier Iain Gregory Robertson, OBE TD DL
- Mrs Eluned Clifton-Davies
- Mrs Daryl Margaret Perkins
- Mrs Celia Ann Streeter
- Dr Liu Bing-fai
- Dr Sarath Malcolm Samarage
- Dr Don Wilmot Weerasooriya
- John Michael Wright
- Mrs Barbara Taylor
- Dr Nicholas John Astbury
- Nevin Christian Brown
- Julian Victor Brandt III
- Douglas Hayward Evans
- Peter Irving Channing Knowles II
- Walter William Moore II
- Howard Pyle
- George Thomas Williamson
- John Nicholas Woolfe
- David Morris Yudain
- Ms Erika DeWyllie Billick
- Kathryn Spotswood Lines Cox III
- Mary Catherine Metzger Harvey
- Alan Roy Butterfield
- Charles Roderick Spencer Fowler, OBE TD DL
- Norman Gareth Gooding
- Dr Rex Anthony Smith
- David Malcolm Thomas
- John Douglas Wills
- Mrs Pauline Anne Buchanan
- Jennifer Burkett
- Mrs Claire Theresa Hensman
- Miss Patricia Mary Holten
- Mrs Lynn Margaret Mosley
- Raymond Bugeja
- Captain Reuben Lanfranco
- Revd Canon Simon Henry Martin Godfrey
- Lieutenant Colonel Josef Johannes Le Roux, MMM
- Dr Donati Njama
- Miss Margaret Jackson Lee
- Mrs Hazel Jennifer Watson

=== Officer of the Order of St John ===
- Dean Steven Allen
- Major Robert Charles Cole
- Eric Collinson
- Michael Davies
- Paul Victor Dedman, MBE
- Edmund Fitzhugh, OBE DL
- Stuart Fletcher, OBE
- Adam Gosling
- Henry Goulding
- Rhodri Griffiths
- Derek Howell
- Michael King
- David John Leeser
- Kevin Michael Lilwall
- Timothy McVey
- Richard Pearce
- Major Stephen Smedley
- Wayne Warlow
- David Trevor Huxley Williams
- Ernest Woodhall
- Mrs Rosemary Butler
- Mrs Joyce Charlton
- Miss Geraldine Mary Costello
- Miss Valerie Mary Costello
- Mrs Sarah Duss
- Miss Helen Elizabeth Gilbertson
- Mrs Helen Gwilliam
- Mrs Cathrin Hughes
- Mrs Hazel Lewis
- Mrs Anna Winifred Lucas, JP
- Professor Donna Mead, OBE
- Mrs Eleanor Merrills
- Mrs Rachel Needs
- Mrs Irene Joyce Phillips
- Mrs Irene Mary Maude Phillips
- Mrs Josephine Roberts
- Miss Heather Ann Robertson
- Mrs Moya Travis
- Dr Chung Ka-leung
- Wasantha Palinda Edirisinghe
- Godamunne Rathnayaka Mudiyanselage Gedara Muthu Banda Godamunne
- Tuan Farook Jayah
- Mahagamaralalage Sunil Jayaseela
- Nandasena Kananke
- Mohamed Haniffa Mohamed Khaleel
- Watutanthrige Mahiman Prasantha Lal De Alwis
- Lam Hoo-tak
- Lee Wing-tak Patre
- Leung Tai-lin
- Denipitiya Withanage Don Upali Perera
- Prangige Sarath Nanda Kumara Perera
- Tuan Zuheer Raban
- Nihal Indrajith Ramanayake
- Errol Gregory Smith
- Yau Shu-fung
- Ms Chan Kit-har Josephine
- Mrs Ng King-chu
- Gerald John Buddle
- James George Naphambo
- Zunga Siakalima
- Mrs Marilyn Jeanne James
- Miss Julie Walton
- Mrs Cynthia White
- Thomas Pera Alexander
- Damian Sergiu Antonescu
- Carl Grover Berry
- John Garland Pollard Boatwright
- Daryl Glynn Byrd
- Dr James Marvin Campbell
- Sir Thomas Vincent Fean, KCVO
- Guy Wallis Morton
- Fouad Ibrahim El-Najjar
- Mazen Ezzat Qupty
- Dr Sami Rashad Sukhtian
- Anthony Carlton Coe
- Todd Alexander Culbertson
- Dr Michael Thomas Bryan Dennis
- William Patrick Enright
- James Marvin Hutchisson
- Dr Thomas Morgan Hyers
- John Oliver Geoffrey Jenkins
- Martin M. Koffel
- The Reverend Kirk Allan Lee
- Dwain Gregory Jr
- Forrest Edward Mars Jr
- Dr Charles Stebner Mosteller
- Edward Sidney Oppenheimer
- Rowland Andrew Radford Jr
- The Reverend William Lewis Sachs
- Leland Clay Selby
- Dr James Leigh Snyder
- James Arthur Zurn
- Miss Ann Isabel Daugherty
- Mrs Palmer Peebles Garson
- Mrs Elizabeth Susanne Koffel
- Mrs Adrienne Leichtle Maxwell
- Mrs Natalie Thomas Pray
- Ms Maxey Jerome Roberts
- Mrs Elisheva Shaked
- Mrs Virginia Creary Smith Snider
- Mrs Diana Strawbridge Wister
- Cheong Kee Toh
- Chua Ping Ping Nelson
- Liang Chiang Heng
- Doctor Sarvaselan Reuben Emmanuel Sayampanathan
- Terence Robert George Blacktop
- Trevor Anthony Brooks
- Stuart Russell Chalmers
- Dr Kung-Kim Chan
- Robert Hugh Foulkes
- Reverend Richard John Gray
- Richard James Marlow
- Surgeon Rear Admiral Calum James Gibb McArthur, QHP
- Dr Roger Charles Milner
- Charles Albert Myers
- John Lennox Napier
- Jon-Brian Parker
- Derek Stanley Seiver
- Martyn Clive Steers
- David Harding Verity
- Captain Louis Roland Uppiah
- Rev David Alexander Van Oeveren
- Brian Edward Weldon
- Alastair Stuart McGregor Wood
- Mrs Julie Ann Brayne
- Mrs Melanie Anne Buckland
- Mrs Joanne Marie Conroy
- Miss Susan Jane Crowhurst
- Mrs Enid Susan Gathercole
- Mrs Janice Kathryn Houston
- Miss Susan Hunter
- Mrs Deborah Ann Lewis
- Mrs Cicely Mary Napier
- Mrs Dorothy Ruth Tuck
- Mrs Barbara Ann Tyekiff
- Dr Fenella Kate Wrigley
- Mrs Sarah Catherine Mary Shilson, JP
- Christopher Borg Cardona
- Franco Caruana
- Dr Mohamed Farooq Chaudhry
- Brian Philip Cranmer
- Andrew Grech
- Noel Grixti D’Amato
- Jonathan Paul Knight
- Alex Odhiambo Ouma
- Andrew Pizzuto
- Andrico Regardo Stephanus
- Brendan Laurence Voigt
- George Thomas Woods
- Mrs Theresa Debarro
- Dr Zipporah Njeri Gathuya
- Miss Dorothy Lefela Matsho
- Mrs Zulfah Mohamed
