= List of judges of the Court of Appeal of England and Wales =

The ordinary judges of the Court of Appeal of England and Wales are the Lord Justices of Appeal and Lady Justices of Appeal. These judges serve with the ex officio members of the court:

- Lord Chief Justice
- Master of the Rolls
- President of the King's Bench Division
- President of the Family Division
- President of the Business and Property Division
- Supreme Court judges appointed from the Court of Appeal or who were eligible to serve on it when appointed to the Supreme Court

Judges of the Court of Appeal are made members of the Privy Council within months of appointment, enabling them to serve as members of the Judicial Committee of the Privy Council and entitling them to the style The Right Honourable.

The Senior Courts Act 1981 limited in principle the total number of Lord Justices of Appeal and Lady Justices of Appeal; it was raised by one to 39 by The Maximum Number of Judges Order 2015 (the Act allows for such Orders). The Judicial Pensions and Retirement Act 1993 mandated that, along with other senior judges throughout the UK, they retired at 70 years of age (save for judges appointed before 31 March 1995 who had to retire at 75). However, the Public Service Pensions and Judicial Offices Act 2022 amended the 1993 Act to restore the retirement age of 75 for all judges, whenever appointed.

== Ex officio judges ==
These are the ex officio judges of the Court of Appeal excepting the qualifying justices of the Supreme Court (the judges appointed from England and Wales); they are listed at Justice of the Supreme Court of the United Kingdom:

Office	Judge	Alma mater	Mandatory retirement	Date of appointment	Prior roles
Lady Chief Justice of England and Wales	The Baroness Carr of Walton-on-the-Hill	Trinity College, Cambridge	1 September 2039	1 October 2023	Court of Appeal (21 April 2020); Queen's Bench (14 June 2013)
Master of the Rolls	Sir Colin Birss	Downing College, Cambridge	28 January 2039	2 November 2026	Chancellor (3 November 2025) Court of Appeal (25 January 2021); Chancery Division (13 May 2013)
President of the King's Bench Division	Sir Mark Warby	St John's College, Oxford	10 October 2033	1 October 2026	Court of Appeal (3 February 2021); Queens Bench (10 June 2014)
President of the Family Division	Sir Stephen Cobb	University of Liverpool	12 April 2037	23 April 2026	Court of Appeal (1 July 2025); Family Division (11 January 2013)
President of the Business and Property Division	Vacant				

== List of judges of the Court of Appeal ==
As of 1 October 2026 there are 40 Judges on the court: 29 Lord Justices of Appeal and 11 Lady Justices of Appeal.

	Lord/Lady Justice	Alma mater	Mandatory retirement	Date of appointment	High Court appointment	High Court division	Other roles
1	Sir Kim Lewison	Downing College, Cambridge	1 May 2027	3 October 2011	29 April 2003	Chancery	
2	Sir David Bean	Trinity Hall, Cambridge	25 March 2029	1 October 2014	19 July 2004	King's Bench	Vice President of the Civil Division
3	Dame Eleanor King	University of Hull	13 September 2032	1 October 2014	4 April 2008	Family	Chair of the Judicial College
4	Dame Kathryn [Kate] Thirlwall	University of Bristol; Northumbria University	21 November 2032	1 February 2017	13 April 2010	King's Bench	
5	Sir Andrew Moylan	University of Oxford	23 June 2028	29 March 2017	23 February 2007	Family	
6	Sir Peter Jackson	Brasenose College, Oxford	9 December 2030	2 October 2017	1 October 2010	Family	
7	Sir Guy Newey	Queens' College, Cambridge	21 January 2034	2 October 2017	12 January 2010	Chancery	
8	Sir Rabinder Singh	Trinity College, Cambridge; University of California, Berkeley	6 March 2039	2 October 2017	3 October 2011	King's Bench	
9	Dame Sarah Asplin	Fitzwilliam College, Cambridge; St Edmund Hall, Oxford	16 September 2034	2 October 2017	1 October 2012	Chancery	
10	Sir Jonathan Baker	St John's College, Cambridge	5 August 2030	1 October 2018	2 November 2009	Family	
11	Sir Charles Haddon-Cave	Pembroke College, Cambridge	20 March 2031	1 October 2018	31 October 2011	King's Bench	
12	Sir Nicholas Green	University of Leicester; University of Toronto; University of Southampton	14 October 2033	1 October 2018	1 October 2013	King's Bench	
13	Sir Stephen Males	St John's College, Cambridge	23 November 2030	14 January 2019	1 October 2012	King's Bench	
14	Sir Richard Arnold	Magdalen College, Oxford; University of Westminster	23 June 2036	1 October 2019	1 October 2008	Chancery	
15	Sir Andrew Popplewell	Downing College, Cambridge	14 January 2034	19 October 2019	3 October 2011	King's Bench	
16	Sir James Dingemans	Mansfield College, Oxford	25 June 2039	21 October 2019	10 June 2013	King's Bench	Senior President of Tribunals
17	Sir Stephen Phillips	University College, Oxford	10 October 2036	13 January 2020	1 October 2013	King's Bench	
18	Sir Jeremy Stuart-Smith	Corpus Christi College, Cambridge	18 January 2030	1 October 2020	2 October 2012	King's Bench	
19	Sir Clive Lewis	Churchill College, Cambridge	13 June 2035	1 October 2020	13 June 2013	King's Bench	
20	Dame Geraldine Andrews	King's College London	19 April 2034	1 October 2020	1 October 2013	King's Bench	
21	Sir Christopher Nugee	Corpus Christi College, Oxford	23 January 2034	1 October 2020	1 October 2013	Chancery	
22	Dame Elisabeth Laing	Newnham College, Cambridge	19 November 2031	28 October 2020	29 April 2014	King's Bench	
23	Sir Andrew Edis	University College, Oxford	9 November 2032	27 January 2021	1 October 2014	King's Bench	Vice President of the Criminal Division
24	Dame Philippa Whipple	Merton College, Oxford	7 May 2041	15 November 2021	1 October 2015	King's Bench	
25	Dame Sarah Falk	Sidney Sussex College, Cambridge	1 June 2037	2 November 2022	1 October 2018	Chancery	
26	Sir Peter Fraser	St John's College, Cambridge	6 September 2038	15 December 2023	1 October 2015	King's Bench	Chairman of the Law Commission
27	Sir Jeremy Baker		9 February 2033	1 October 2024	25 March 2013	King's Bench	Vice-President of the King's Bench Division
28	Sir David Holgate	Exeter College, Oxford	3 August 2031	1 October 2024	1 December 2014	King's Bench	
29	Sir Antony Zacaroli	Pembroke College, Oxford	10 May 2033	1 October 2024	13 November 2017	Chancery	
30	Dame Amanda Yip	Emmanuel College, Cambridge	23 April 2044	2 October 2025	2 October 2017	King's Bench	Senior Presiding Judge for England and Wales
31	Sir Robert Miles	Christ Church, Oxford	29 November 2037	7 October 2025	21 April 2020	Chancery	
32	Dame Sara Cockerill	St Anne's College, Oxford	7 November 2043	9 October 2025	1 November 2017	King's Bench	Deputy Head Civil Justice
33	Dame Juliet May	Wadham College, Oxford	21 March 2036	13 November 2025	3 December 2015	King's Bench	Chair of the Sentencing Council
34	Sir Ian Dove	St Catherine's College, Oxford	31 December 2038	13 November 2025	1 October 2014	King's Bench	
35	Sir David Foxton	Magdalen College, Oxford	14 October 2040	12 January 2026	13 January 2020	King's Bench	
36	Sir Timothy Fancourt	Gonville and Caius College, Cambridge	30 August 2039	1 October 2026	11 January 2018	Chancery	
37	Sir Christopher Butcher	Magdalen College, Oxford	14 August 2037	1 October 2026	5 March 2018	King's Bench	
38	Dame Nathalie Lieven	Trinity Hall, Cambridge	20 May 2039	1 October 2026	11 January 2019	King's Bench	
39	Sir Richard Meade	University College, Oxford	14 November 2041	1 October 2026	7 September 2020	Chancery	

== See also ==
- Justice of the Supreme Court of the United Kingdom
- List of High Court judges of England and Wales
- Senator of the College of Justice
