= 2020 Special Honours =

British government recognitions

As part of the British honours system, Special Honours are issued at the Monarch's pleasure at any given time. The Special Honours refer to the awards made within royal prerogative, operational honours, political honours and other honours awarded outside the New Year Honours and Birthday Honours.

== Life Peerage ==
=== Conservative Party ===
- The Rt Hon. Nicola Morgan, to be Baroness Morgan of Cotes, of Cotes in the County of Leicestershire. – 6 January 2020
- The Rt Hon. Zac Goldsmith, to be Baron Goldsmith of Richmond Park, of Richmond Park in the London Borough of Richmond upon Thames – 7 January 2020
- Sir Gerry Grimstone, to be Baron Grimstone of Boscobel, of Belgravia in the City of Westminster – 8 April 2020
- Stephen Greenhalgh, to be Baron Greenhalgh, of Fulham in the London Borough of Hammersmith and Fulham – 16 April 2020
- Lorraine Fullbrook, to be Baroness Fullbrook, of Dogmersfield in the County of Hampshire – 31 July
- Sir Edward Udny-Lister, to be Baron Udny-Lister, of Wandsworth in the London Borough of Wandsworth – 31 July
- Daniel Moylan, to be Baron Moylan, of Kensington in the Royal London Borough of Kensington and Chelsea – 31 July
- Andrew Sharpe, OBE, to be Baron Sharpe of Epsom, of Epsom in the County of Surrey – 31 July
- Michael Spencer, to be Baron Spencer of Alresford, of Alresford in the County of Hampshire – 31 July
- Veronica Wadley, CBE, to be Baroness Fleet, of Hampstead in the London Borough of Camden – 31 July
- James Wharton, to be Baron Wharton of Yarm, of Yarm in the County of North Yorkshire – 31 July
- Dame Helena Morrissey, DBE, to be Baroness Morrissey, of Chapel Green in the Royal County of Berkshire – 31 July
- Neil Mendoza, to be Baron Mendoza, of King’s Reach in the City of London – 31 July
- David Frost, CMG, to be Baron Frost, of Allenton in the County of Derbyshire – 12 August 2020
- Keith Stewart, QC, to be Baron Stewart of Dirleton, of Dirleton in the County of East Lothian – 6 November 2020
- The Rt Hon. Richard Benyon, to be Baron Benyon, of Englefield in the Royal County of Berkshire – 22 December
- Peter Cruddas, to be Baron Cruddas, of Shoreditch in the London Borough of Hackney – 22 December
- Dame Jacqueline Foster, DBE, to be Baroness Foster of Oxton, of Oxton in the County of Merseyside – 22 December
- Stephanie Fraser, to be Baroness Fraser of Craigmaddie, of Craigmaddie in the County of Stirlingshire – 22 December
- Dean Godson, to be Baron Godson, of Thorney Island in the City of Westminster – 22 December
- Daniel Hannan, to be Baron Hannan of Kingsclere, of Kingsclere in the County of Hampshire – 22 December
- Syed Kamall, to be Baron Kamall, of Edmonton in the London Borough of Enfield – 22 December
- David Wolfson, QC, to be Baron Wolfson of Tredegar, of Tredegar in the County of Gwent – 30 December 2020

=== Labour ===
- Sue Hayman, to be Baroness Hayman of Ullock, of Ullock in the County of Cumbria – 31 July
- Prem Sikka, to be Baron Sikka, of Kingswood in Basildon in the County of Essex – 31 July
- Anthony Woodley, to be Baron Woodley, of Wallasey in the Metropolitan Borough of Wirral – 31 July
- Cllr Judith Blake, CBE, to be Baroness Blake of Leeds, of Gledhow in the City of Leeds – 31 July
- Jennifer Chapman, to be Baroness Chapman of Darlington, of Darlington in the County of Durham – 22 December
- Vernon Coaker, to be Baron Coaker, of Gedling in the County of Nottinghamshire – 22 December
- Wajid Khan, to be Baron Khan of Burnley, of Burnley in the County of Lancashire – 22 December
- Gillian Merron, to be Baroness Merron, of Lincoln in the County of Lincolnshire – 22 December

=== Non-Affiliated ===
- Claire Fox, to be Baroness Fox of Buckley, of Buckley in the County of Flintshire – 31 July
- Charles Moore, to be Baron Moore of Etchingham, of Etchingham in the County of East Sussex – 31 July

=== Crossbench ===
- The Rt Hon. Lord Reed, PC, to be Baron Reed of Allermuir, of Sundridge Park in the London Borough of Bromley. – 11 January 2020
- Sir Ian Botham, OBE, to be Baron Botham, of Ravensworth in the County of North Yorkshire – 31 July
- Dame Louise Casey, DBE CB, to be Baroness Casey of Blackstock, of Finsbury in the London Borough of Islington – 31 July
- Evgeny Lebedev, to be Baron Lebedev, of Hampton in the London Borough of Richmond upon Thames and of Siberia in the Russian Federation – 31 July
- Dame Minouche Shafik, DBE, to be Baroness Shafik, of Camden in the London Borough of Camden and of Alexandria in the Arab Republic of Egypt – 31 July
- Sir Mark Sedwill, KCMG, to be Baron Sedwill, of Sherborne in the County of Dorset – 11 September 2020
- The Rt Hon. Sir Terence Etherton, PC, to be Baron Etherton, of Marylebone in the City of Westminster – 23 December
- Sir Simon McDonald, KCMG KCVO, to be Baron McDonald of Salford, of Pendleton in the City of Salford – 22 December
- Sir Andrew Parker, KCB, to be Baron Parker of Minsmere, of Minsmere in the County of Suffolk – 22 December
- The Rt Revd. and Rt Hon. Dr John Sentamu, to be Baron Sentamu, of Lindisfarne in the County of Northumberland and of Masooli in the Republic of Uganda – 22 December

== Lord Lieutenant ==
- James Saunders Watson – to be Lord-Lieutenant of Northamptonshire – 7 January 2020
- The Rt Hon. The Lady Colgrain – to be Lord-Lieutenant of Kent – 8 January 2020
- Major-General The Hon. Seymour Hector Russell Hale Monro, CBE LVO – to be Lord-Lieutenant for Moray – 29 January 2020
- Elizabeth Elaine Grieve – to be Lord-Lieutenant for Orkney – 29 January 2020
- Roberta Louise Fleet – to be Lord-Lieutenant for West Glamorgan – 10 February 2020
- Aileen Brewis – to be Lord-Lieutenant for Wigtown – 13 February 2020
- Lt.-Colonel Richard Callander, LVO OBE TD – to be Lord-Lieutenant for Midlothian – 30 April 2020
- Elizabeth Fothergill, CBE – to be Lord-Lieutenant of the County of Derbyshire – 14 May 2020
- The Rt Hon. The Countess Howe – to be Lord-Lieutenant of the County of Buckinghamshire – 26 June 2020
- Jane Margaret MacLeod – to be Lord-Lieutenant for Argyll and Bute – 14 July 2020
- Jill Williamina Young – to be Lord-Lieutenant of Dunbartonshire – 12 August 2020
- Alastair Macphie – to be Lord-Lieutenant of Kincardineshire – 1 October 2020

== Privy Counsellor ==
- The Hon. Sir Stephen Phillips, QC – 12 February 2020
- The Hon. Sir Richard Arnold, QC – 12 February 2020
- The Hon. Sir Bernard McCloskey, QC – 12 February 2020
- The Hon. Dame Ingrid Simler, DBE, QC – 12 February 2020
- Prof. Andrew Burrows, QC – 12 February 2020
- Suella Braverman, MP – 19 February 2020
- George Eustice, MP – 19 February 2020
- Amanda Milling, MP – 19 February 2020
- Anne-Marie Trevelyan, MP – 19 February 2020
- The Hon. Dame Sue Carr, DBE, QC – 23 June 2020
- The Most Rev. Stephen Cottrell – 21 July 2020
- The Hon. Lord Pentland, QC – 20 August 2020
- The Hon. Lord Woolman, QC – 20 August 2020
- The Hon. Dame Geraldine Andrews, DBE, QC – 11 November 2020
- The Hon. Sir Clive Lewis, QC – 11 November 2020
- The Hon. Sir Christopher Nugee, QC – 11 November 2020
- The Hon. Sir Jeremy Stuart-Smith, QC – 11 November 2020
- The Hon. Dame Elisabeth Laing, DBE, QC – 16 December 2020

== Knight Bachelor ==
Knight Bachelor ribbon

- Captain Thomas Moore – For charitable services to the National Health Service. – 20 May 2020

== Most Distinguished Order of St Michael and St George ==
Order of St Michael and St George ribbon

=== Dame Grand Cross of the Order of St Michael and St George (GCMG) ===
- Her Excellency Susan Dougan, OBE – Governor-General of Saint Vincent and the Grenadines – 29 January 2020

== Royal Victorian Order ==
Royal Victorian Order ribbon

=== Knight Commander of the Royal Victorian Order (KCVO) ===
- Michael Charles William Norreys Jephson, CVO – upon relinquishment of his appointment as Secretary of the Master of the Household’s Department, Royal Household – 16 December 2020.

=== Commander of the Royal Victorian Order (CVO) ===
- Lady Elizabeth Georgiana Shakerley – for her service to The Queen – 31 March 2020

=== Member of the Royal Victorian Order (MVO) ===
- Lieutenant Colonel Nana Kofi Twumasi-Ankrah – upon relinquishing his appointment as Equerry to The Queen – 27 November 2020

== Most Excellent Order of the British Empire ==
Ribbon bar of the Order of the British Empire (Military)

Ribbon bar of the Order of the British Empire (Civil)

=== Knight Commander of the Order of the British Empire (KBE) ===
Civil division
Honorary

- Esa-Pekka Salonen – Principal Conductor and Artistic Advisor for the Philharmonia Orchestra. For services to music and UK-Finland relations.

Military division
Honorary

- Joseph Dunford – Retired General and Former Chairman of the Joint Chiefs of Staff, US Military. For services to the support of the UK military.

=== Commander of the Order of the British Empire (CBE) ===
Civil division
Honorary

- Shaun Timothy Kelly – Former Global Chief Operating Officer for KPMG International. For services to economic development in Northern Ireland.
- Pia Randbo Jepson Wilkes – Chief Executive, Vehicle Certification Agency. For services to motor transport.

Military division

- Air Commodore Justin Stuart Reuter, Royal Air Force – 27 March 2020
- Colonel Marcus James Mudd – 27 November 2020

=== Officer of the Order of the British Empire (OBE) ===
Military division

- Commander William Robert Charles King, Royal Navy – 27 March 2020
- Colonel Andrew Timothy David Jackson – 27 March 2020
- Wing Commander Neil Campbell Sefton, Royal Air Force – 27 March 2020
- Captain Robert George Anders, Royal Fleet Auxiliary – 27 March 2020
- Commander Suzy Helen Conway, Royal Navy – 27 November 2020
- Commander Richard Paul Hewitt, Royal Navy – 27 November 2020
- Colonel John Leslie Baynham – 27 November 2020

Civil division
Honorary

- Nadim Abboud – Honorary Legal Adviser to the British Embassy in Beirut. For services to British interests in Lebanon.
- Eduardo Eurnekian – President, Corporación América. For services to UK/Argentina relations.
- Florence Garabedian – Chair, Self-Directed Support Scotland and Chief Executive, Lothian Centre for Inclusive Living. For services to the independent living movement.
- Haruki Hayashi – Regional Chief Executive Officer, Mitsubishi Corporation, Europe and Africa and Chief Executive Officer, Mitsubishi Corporation International (Europe) plc. For services to UK/Japan commercial and cultural relations
- Rowaida Abdulmajid Saeed Khulaidi – Country Director, British Council Yemen. For services to UK/Yemen cultural relations.
- John Curt Mingé – Former President, BP America. For services to British business in the US.
- Christos Psaltis – Senior Political Officer, British Embassy, Athens. For services to UK/Greece relations.
- Zaza Purtseladze – Director, British Council, South Caucasus. For services to UK/Georgia cultural relations.
- Renata Leal da Silva Ramalhosa – Department for International Trade Foreign Direct Investment Latin America and Deputy Consul General, Sao Paulo. For services to Her Majesty’s Government overseas.
- Gerald Arthur Rolph – Owner of Allerton Castle. For services to historic preservation and conservation.
- Peter Slosse – Director of Tourism, Ypres. For services to UK commemorations.
- André Franciszek Spitzman Jordan – World Fellow of and volunteer for the Duke of Edinburgh’s International Award Foundation. For services to the Duke of Edinburgh’s International Award.
- Hazel Elizabeth Winning – Lead Allied Health Professions Officer, Department of Health, Northern Ireland Executive. For services to health and social care.

=== Member of the Order of the British Empire (MBE) ===
Military division

- Acting Major (now Captain) Patrick Francis Bryan Keating, The Rifles – 27 March 2020
- Lieutenant Commander Ben Russell Martin, Royal Navy – 27 November 2020
- Major (now Acting Lieutenant Colonel) Philip O’Callaghan, Royal Marines – 27 November 2020
- Lance Corporal Elham Sedeqi, The Parachute Regiment – 27 November 2020
- Staff Sergeant Jason Peter Wilcox, Intelligence Corps – 27 November 2020

Civil division
Honorary

- Daphine Aikens – Founder and Chief Executive, Hammersmith and Fulham Foodbank. For services to the community in Hammersmith and Fulham.
- Lisa Sophie Bechner – Chairwoman of Kindertransport Organisation Germany. For services to UK-German relations and the British commemoration of the Kindertransport rescue effort prior to the Second World War.
- Maria Alice Buckley O’Carroll – Director of Midwifery, Women and Children, Royal Free London NHS Foundation Trust. For services to midwifery.
- Suzanne Bridget Cheasty-Higgins – Lead Volunteer, Our Lady Help of Christians RC Church, Kentish Town, London. For voluntary and charitable services to homeless people in the London Borough of Camden.
- Daniel Cordier – Second World War Resistance Fighter. For services to the United Kingdom in the Second World War.
- Izabella Maria Cwetsch – British Vice Consul, British Embassy, Warsaw, Poland. For services British nationals in Poland.
- Werner Fenner – Transport and Logistics Officer, British Embassy, Brasilia. For services to UK interests in Brazil.
- Alfredo Emilio Fierro Gonfiotti – Director, Department for International Trade Argentina, British Embassy, Buenos Aires. For services to international trade.
- Mark Darren Fitzgerald – Technical Supervisor, Commonwealth War Graves Commission, Malta. For services to Commonwealth war graves.
- Hubert Germain – Second World War Resistance Fighter. For services to the United Kingdom in the Second World War.
- The Reverend Canon Faez Jerjes – Parish Priest, St George's Episcopal Anglican Church, Baghdad. For services to the Anglican, Christian and local community in Baghdad.
- Maria Leonor Ribeiro da Fonseca Calixto Machado de Sousa – Retired Professor. Founder and Head, Anglo-Portuguese Studies Department, FCSH, Universidade Nova de Lisboa, Portugal. First Female Head of the National Library. For services to UK/Portuguese Studies and academic relations.
- John Níall Gearoid McLaughlin – Architect. For services to architecture.
- Mohammed Rasool Mohibzada – Resources Officer, British Council, Afghanistan. For services to the security & communications of the British Council in Afghanistan.
- Eva Maria Prada – Director of the British Chamber of Commerce in Spain. For services to British business in Spain.
- Tanazzeena Qureshi – International Pension Service Officer, British High Commission, Dhaka, Bangladesh. For services to Her Majesty’s Government service delivery overseas.
- Francisco Rodilla Benito – Spanish Technical Director, member of Secondary SMT and teacher of Philosophy, Religion and History. For services to the development of bilingual education and UK-Spanish relations.
- Pierre Simonet – Second World War Resistance Fighter. For services to the United Kingdom in the Second World War.
- Angela Marie Tanzillo-Swarts – Forensic DNA Specialist, Health Services Authority, Cayman Islands. For services to the COVID 19 Response in the Cayman Islands
- Edgard Tupët-Thomé – Second World War Resistance Fighter. For services to the United Kingdom in the Second World War.
- Erwin Ureel – Vice Chairman, Friends of the Passchendaele Museum and Events Organiser. For services to commemorations of the British contribution to the defence of Belgium in the First World War.
- Martin Henderson Wells – President, the British Hospital, Montevideo. For services to the British community in Uruguay.

== British Empire Medal (BEM) ==
Ribbon bar of the British Empire Medal (Civil)

Honorary

- Pa Assan Badjan – Emergency Services Porter, Royal London Hospital Emergency Department. For services to the NHS
- Haluk Metin Çekirdek – Protocol and Customs Officer, British Embassy, Ankara. For services to the British Embassy, Ankara.
- Onyinye Aureola Enwezor – Shared Governance Clinical Educator, Nottingham University Hospitals NHS Trust. For services to the NHS
- Linus Prodip Gomes – Head Bearer/Butler, British High Commissioner’s residence, Dhaka. For services to the UK/Bangladesh relations.
- Ashraf Hamido Desouki – Chair, A Better Tomorrow community group. For service to supporting refugees and asylum seekers in Halton Borough during the COVID-19 Pandemic
- Dušan Mihajilović – Head of Political and Public Diplomacy, British Embassy, Belgrade. For services to British Interests in Serbia and Commemoration of the First World War.
- Bukola Muhydeen Olamijuwon – Welfare Secretary, Nasrul-Lahi-L-Faith Society (Nasfat) Millwall Branch. For services to Nasfat UK and Ireland during COVID-19
- Patricia Simoyi – Nurse, Birmingham Community Healthcare NHS Foundation Trust. For services to chronic kidney disease.

== Royal Victorian Medal (RVM) ==
Royal Victorian Medal ribbon

Silver Medal

- Ferris Ash – Gentleman of the Chapel Royal Choir, Windsor Great Park – 17 April 2020

Bar to Silver Medal

- Gary Philip Jones, RVM – On the relinquishment of his appointment as Fendersmith, Windsor Castle – 17 January 2020

== Mentioned in Despatches ==
Palm of the Mentioned in Despatches

- Flight Lieutenant Aaron Mark Kerry, Royal Air Force – 27 March 2020

== Queen's Commendation for Bravery ==
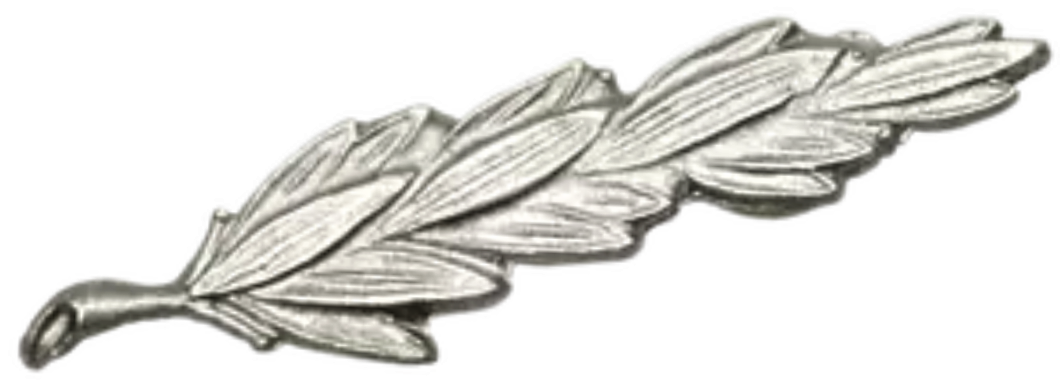
Queen's Commendation for Bravery

- Staff Sergeant Steven Wayne Cockburn, The Royal Logistic Corps – 27 November 2020
- Captain Karl Anthony Williams, The Royal Logistic Corps – 27 November 2020

== Queen's Commendation for Valuable Service ==
Palm of the Queen's Commendation for Valuable Service

- Acting Captain (now Commander) Manson John Carnie, Royal Navy – 27 March 2020
- Lieutenant Commander Samuel Nightingale, Royal Navy – 27 March 2020
- Lieutenant Commander Jamie Vaughan, Royal Navy – 27 March 2020
- Major (now Acting Lieutenant Colonel) Nigel Robert Campbell, The Royal Irish Regiment – 27 March 2020
- Acting Major (now Major) Luke Denby-Hollis, Royal Regiment of Artillery – 27 March 2020
- Lieutenant Colonel (now Acting Colonel) Matthew Thomas Ketterer, Adjutant General’s Corps (Educational and Training Services Branch) – 27 March 2020
- Lieutenant Colonel Huw Charles Ewan Law, Army Air Corps – 27 March 2020
- Acting Sergeant (now Corporal) Samantha Jane Lumb, Intelligence Corps – 27 March 2020
- Warrant Officer Class 2 Benjamin James Medus, The Princess of Wales’s Royal Regiment – 27 March 2020
- Corporal (now Acting Sergeant) Martins Idoko Ushie, Royal Army Medical Corps – 27 March 2020
- Lieutenant William Fraser Wheeler, The Rifles – 27 March 2020
- Flight Lieutenant Philip Dawe, Royal Air Force – 27 March 2020
- Wing Commander Matthew David Hoare, Royal Air Force – 27 March 2020
- Flight Lieutenant (now Squadron Leader) Matthew Turl, Royal Air Force – 27 March 2020
- Commander Benjamin Charles Keith, Royal Navy – 27 November 2020
- Lieutenant (now Lieutenant Commander) Alexander Antony Szweda, Royal Navy – 27 November 2020
- Corporal Louise Lillian Cooper, Adjutant General’s Corps (Staff and Personnel Support Branch) – 27 November 2020
- Captain Alun Huw Morris, Corps of Royal Electrical and Mechanical Engineers – 27 November 2020
- Colonel Roderick Miles Less – 27 November 2020
- Lance Corporal Hannah Richardson, Royal Army Medical Corps – 27 November 2020
- Sergeant (now Staff Sergeant) Ashley Jade Roylance, Intelligence Corps – 27 November 2020
- Major Kerry Anne Schultz, The Royal Logistic Corps – 27 November 2020
- Lieutenant Colonel Matthew James Edney Smith, Corps of Royal Engineers – 27 November 2020
- Corporal Samuel David George Butler, Royal Air Force – 27 November 2020
- Squadron Leader John Michael Plenty, Royal Air Force – 27 November 2020

== Order of St John ==
Order of St John ribbon

=== Bailiff of the Order of St John ===
- Hon Major (Rtd) Marsden Madoka

=== Dame of the Order of St John ===
- Dr. Gillian Elisabeth Willmore
- Dame Cécile Ellen La Grenade, GCMG, OBE

=== Knight of the Order of St John ===
- The Very Reverend Dr. Nicholas Arthur Frayling
- John Percy Gill
- Nigel Graham Heath
- The Reverend Canon Barnabas John William Hunt
- Fra’ John Timothy Dunlap
- Oliver Mathias Patrick Ehinger
- Dr. Frederik Paulsen, OBE
- John Henry Whitehead
- Kenneth Ivan Williamson
- John Douglas Wills
- Lazaro Akunga Kimang’a
- Sir Andrew John Cash, OBE

=== Dame of the Order of St John ===
- Lorna Jury Gladstone
- Michelle Phyllis Anne Corkindale
- Joy Elizabeth Jackson, MBE

=== Commander of the Order of St John ===
- Edmund John Seward Anderson
- Barrie George Davies, MBE
- Andrew Jackson Coombe
- Sir Charles James Hoare, 9th Baronet
- Ian Dunlop Phipps
- Andrew Barry Wapling
- Janet Wilson
- Susan Margaret Winfield, OBE
- Fiona Woodrow
- Fenella Anne Woolams
- Carl Grover Berry
- John Garland Pollard Boatwright
- Daryl Glynn Byrd
- Dr. James Marvin Campbell
- Lieutenant Commander John Curtiss Glynn Jr
- Dr. Gary Paul Kearney
- James Howard Wells
- Dr. Patricia Kavanagh
- Adrienne Leichtle Maxwell
- The Honorable Mary Moncure Matthews Raether
- Lynne Androus Smith
- Geraldine Mary Costello
- Valerie Mary Costello
- Susan Jane Winter
- Colonel Sir Brian Walter de Stopham Barttelot, 3rd Baronet, OBE, DL
- Peter Sherlaw Coulson
- Simon Patrick Pollock
- Robert Andrew Voss, CBE
- Danielle Louise Gillespie
- Brenda Joy Hynes
- Bruce John MacDonald
- Kerry Daniel Mitchell
- Most Rev. Sir David John Moxon KNZM
- Andrew Zhu

=== Officer of the Order of St John ===
- Colonel Adrian Matthew Donaldson, MBE
- Philip Ridley Hall, OBE
- Dr. Androulla Christodoulidoy
- Jules Lockett
- Christopher Hugh McCall, QC
- Natalie Elaine Miller
- Sandra Lorraine SCOTT
- Dr. Nicola Jane Shaw
- His Honour Simon Crompton Darwall - Smith
- John Percy Gill
- Dr. Jeremy Peter Warren
- Thomas Stephen Webster

=== Member of the Order of St John ===
- Andrea Covre
- Dr. David Smyth McKee Jr
- Thomas June Melton III
- Dr. David Ng
- William Robert Nunery
