= Archie Battersbee case =

Legal dispute about life support for a boy in England

Hollie Dance and Paul Battersbee -v- Barts Health NHS Trust and another
- Court: High Court of Justice (Family Division)
- Decided: 1 August 2022 (Court of Appeal)
- Citation: "Hollie Dance and Paul Battersbee -v- Barts Health NHS Trust and another". Her Majesty's Courts and Tribunals Service. 2 August 2022.

Court membership
- Judges sitting: Sir Andrew McFarlane, President of the Family Division, Lady Justice King and Lord Justice Moylan

Hollie Dance and Paul Battersbee vs Barts Health NHS Trust and another was a legal case in the United Kingdom that was the subject of several court hearings between April and August 2022. The case centred around whether or not to withdraw the life support of 12-year-old Archie Battersbee, who was found unconscious and subsequently considered to have suffered brainstem death.

The courts ruled in favour of Barts Health NHS Trust, and against his parents, and allowed his life support to be withdrawn. Battersbee died on 6 August 2022 shortly after his life support was ended, four months after he was first found unconscious. His cause of death was later ruled to be "catastrophic hypoxic ischemic brain injury, secondary to strangulation" as a result of an accident due to a failed prank or experiment. Early claims of a link to the TikTok "blackout challenge" were later dismissed due to a lack of evidence.

== Incident ==
On 7 April 2022, a 12-year-old boy, Archie Battersbee, from Southend, Essex, England, was found unconscious by his mother, Hollie Dance, with a dressing gown cord around his neck. Dance performed CPR, and called for an ambulance. The paramedics who attended found that Archie Battersbee had suffered a cardiac arrest and his Glasgow Coma Scale score was three, the lowest possible, indicating "no eye-opening, verbal or motor response". CPR was continued and he was taken to Southend University Hospital in Southend-on-Sea, Essex.

On arrival at the hospital, he had no pulse, before regaining spontaneous circulation around 40 minutes after his mother had found him unconscious. It was believed that Battersbee sustained brain damage during this cardiac arrest, due to a lack of oxygen and blood supply to the brain, and for a sustained period. He was transferred the next day to the Royal London Hospital in Whitechapel, London.

Dance stated that she believed Battersbee was taking part in a dangerous TikTok phenomenon known as the "blackout challenge". This claim of a link to TikTok was broadcast on ITV's This Morning, but ITV subsequently apologised, claiming there was no evidence that Battersbee viewed this particular challenge via TikTok and also noting that TikTok does act to remove dangerous content. On 8 November 2022, during a pre-inquest hearing, the Essex senior coroner Lincoln Brookes said there was no evidence that Battersbee had been taking part in an online challenge.

== Legal cases ==
Battersbee's parents had refused permission for the hospital to perform brainstem testing. On 26 April, the Barts Health NHS Trust made two applications to the High Court of Justice: one for a Specific Issue Order, under section 8 of the Children Act 1989, that it was lawful for Battersbee to undergo brainstem testing, in accordance with the Academy of Medical Royal Colleges' 2008 Code of Practice for the Diagnosis and Confirmation of Death, to establish whether he was brainstem dead. The other application, should the first fail, was for the Court to consider whether it was in Battersbee's 'best interests' to continue receiving ventilation assistance. Both requests were opposed by the parents, who had the support of the Christian Legal Centre. A further party introduced to proceedings was Battersbee himself, represented by a guardian appointed by the Children and Family Court Advisory and Support Service (CAFCASS). Subsequent appeals made by the family were heard by the Court of Appeal, and finally by the Supreme Court.

The NHS Trust argued that Battersbee's treatment should discontinue as he was considered 'brainstem dead', and thus had no hope of recovery. Battersbee's parents had argued that he "needed more time to heal", and that his own religious beliefs should be taken into account, his mother saying that "it is for God to decide what should happen to Archie, including if, when and how he should die." Battersbee's family also requested the interventions of the United Nations' Committee on the Rights of Persons with Disabilities, which appeared to have no jurisdiction over the case, as well as the European Court of Human Rights (ECtHR), which subsequently declined to hear the case.

The English courts, repeatedly ruled that Battersbee's treatment should end on the basis that the Children Act 1989 requires decisions at all stages of a case to be made with the child's welfare as a factor of paramount importance. All appeals made by the family against the courts' rulings were denied, with the exception of one that declared Battersbee was not already legally 'dead'. His life-supporting equipment, including mechanical ventilation, was finally withdrawn on 6 August 2022 and Battersbee was pronounced dead shortly afterwards at 12:15 BST.

== Inquest ==
On 12 August 2022 at Essex Coroner's Court, the inquest was opened into Battersbee's death by Lincoln Brookes, the senior coroner for Essex. It was confirmed that the cause of death was "catastrophic hypoxic ischemic brain injury, secondary to strangulation". The court heard that Battersbee had sustained the brain injury whilst at home. A full inquest was scheduled for 7 February 2023.

On 8 November 2022 a pre-inquest review heard from the Brookes that there was "no evidence" that Battersbee was taking part in an online challenge at the time of his death. Police concurred with the coroner's statement that "it's low mood we're looking at here, very low mood." The pre-inquest review confirmed that the full inquest would consider Battersbee's "state of mind and his intentions". On 8 February 2023 Brookes concluded that Battersbee "had not intended to harm himself but had done inadvertently during a prank or experiment that went wrong".

== Timeline ==
=== April 2022 ===
- 7 April – Battersbee was found unconscious at home and subsequently taken to Southend University Hospital.
- 8 April – Battersbee was transferred from Southend University Hospital to The Royal London Hospital, where he remained until his death.
- 26 April – The NHS Trust began High Court proceedings to allow them to perform brainstem testing on Battersbee, due to his parents having refused consent.
- 28 April – High Court directions hearing: Battersbee joined as a party to the case and a guardian was appointed to represent him. A Reporting Restriction Order (RRO) was granted, prohibiting any of the parties in the case from being identified.

=== May 2022 ===
- 4 May – High Court directions hearing: Reporting Restriction Order (RRO) was granted, prohibiting professionals and parties involved in the case from being identified outside of the courtroom.
- 13 May – Public High Court hearing: Mrs Justice Arbuthnot ruled that brainstem tests should be carried out; reporting restrictions continue to apply in relation to the medical staff involved in the case.
- 16 May – Battersbee 'did not respond to peripheral nerve stimulation tests', a precursor to brainstem tests'.
- 25 May – A hearing was held to decide whether MRI scans should be performed. Battersbee's parents objected to this request on the basis that moving him could harm him.
- 27 May – The court approved the undertaking of MRI scans, which took place on 31 May.
- 31 May – After multiple MRI scans, Battersbee was declared to be suffering from brainstem death.

=== June 2022 ===
- 6–8 June – A 3-day hearing was held to decide whether Battersbee's life-support mechanisms should be continued.
- 13 June – The High Court ruled that, based on evidence from the MRI scan results, Battersbee should be considered 'dead' and that treatment could be withdrawn.
- 20 June – The Court of Appeal received an appeal from Battersbee's family requesting that they reconsider the case.
- 29 June – The Court of Appeal ruled that a new hearing should take place to determine Battersbee's 'best interests'.

=== July 2022 ===
- 11 July – A new hearing took place in the High Court, before Mr Justice Hayden.
- 15 July – It was ruled that Battersbee's life-support treatment should end, with Mr Justice Hayden stating that a continuation of this would be "futile".
- 25 July – The most recent High Court ruling was endorsed by three Court of Appeal judges.
- 27 July – Archie's father, Paul Battersbee, was admitted to hospital following a suspected heart attack or stroke. His condition was said to be "stable".
- 28 July – The Supreme Court supported the Court of Appeal's ruling, and ruled out any interventions in the case. Paul Battersbee was released from hospital.
- 29 July – The family made an application to the United Nations' Committee on the Rights of Persons with Disabilities (UNCRPD).
- 30 July – UNCRPD requested a delay to the withdrawal of Battersbee's life-support treatment to allow time for it to consider the case.

=== August 2022 ===
- 1 August – The Court of Appeal (Sir Andrew McFarlane, Lady Justice King and Lord Justice Moylan) ruled that withdrawal of life support should not be postponed beyond 12:00 BST on 2 August; the UNCRPD request was dismissed as 'non-binding'.
- 2 August – Shortly after 12:00 BST, the family submitted an urgent application for permission to appeal to the Supreme Court. The Court confirmed receipt of the application and stated that three justices would consider the application. The application was ultimately rejected the same day by the Court, with "a heavy heart".
- 3 August – The family announced that they would submit an application to the European Court of Human Rights (ECHR), and were given until 09:00 BST to prepare their case, with the Trust saying that treatment would stop at 11:00 BST should the application not be made in time. The Christian Legal Centre submitted the application on time on the family's behalf. This application was turned down by the ECHR, stating that they would not interfere with the UK Court's rulings.
- 4 August – After exhausting all 'legal avenues' of appeal, the family sought legal permission to move Battersbee to a hospice, despite doctors declaring this a significantly risky operation with a high chance of Battersbee's condition deteriorating, even in a short journey by ambulance, and with full intensive care equipment and staff on board. No changes were to be made to his care whilst legal processes were ongoing, the Trust said.
- 5 August – The High Court ruled that Battersbee must not be moved to a hospice and instead must spend his final days at the hospital. Hollie Dance claimed that the hospital would withdraw treatment the next day, and that all 'legal avenues' to continue treatment had been exhausted.
- 6 August – Battersbee's life-support apparatus was withdrawn and soon after he was pronounced dead.
- 7 August – Batterbee's family called for a public inquiry into the actions of the NHS and the High Court's Family Division, and requested changes to their procedures.
- 12 August – The formal inquest into Battersbee's death was opened at Essex Coroner's Court.

=== September 2022 ===
- 13 September – Battersbee's funeral is held in Prittlewell, Southend.

=== November 2022 ===
- 8 November – At a pre-inquest review the chief coroner says there is "no evidence" that Battersbee was taking part in an online challenge at the time of his death. Police concurred that evidence pointed to a "very low mood" before the incident took place.

=== February 2023 ===
- 8 February – the coroner ruled Battersbee's death an accident.

== Summary of judgments ==
Court	Judge(s)	Judgment	Date
High (Family)	Mrs Justice Arbuthnot	Brainstem test should take place.	13 May
High (Family)	Mrs Justice Arbuthnot	Battersbee is declared 'brainstem dead', and deemed to have died at noon on 31 May 2022; withdrawal of treatment ordered.	13 June
Appeal (Civil)	Sir Geoffrey Vos (MR); Sir Andrew McFarlane (PFD); Lady Justice King	Appeal succeeds on one count and Battersbee no longer deemed 'brainstem dead'; direction to return case to High Court to determine 'best interest'.	6 July
High (Family)	Mr Justice Hayden	"Treatment is futile."	15 July
Appeal (Civil)	Sir Andrew McFarlane (PFD); Lady Justice King; Lord Justice Peter Jackson	Appeal is refused, treatment can end.	25 July
Appeal (Civil)	Sir Andrew McFarlane (PFD); Lady Justice King; Lord Justice Moylan	UN Convention is not law. Stay against best interests.	1 August
Supreme	Lord Hodge; Lord Kitchin; Lord Stephens of Creevyloughgare	Permission to appeal is refused, treatment can end.	2 August
ECHR		Complaints inadmissible.	3 August
High (Family)	Mrs Justice Theis	Permission to move Battersbee to a hospice refused	5 August

== Third party involvement and media analysis ==
=== Christian Legal Centre ===
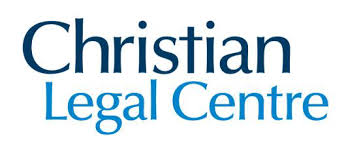
Christian Legal Centre logo

Lawyers from the Christian Legal Centre represented Battersbee's family in the case. In some court hearings, the family was represented by CLC consultant Pavel Stroilov. During his work on the Alfie Evans case, a judge described Stroilov as a "fanatical and deluded young man" whose "malign hand" was "inconsistent with the real interests of the parents' case."

Neena Modi, professor of neonatal medicine at Imperial College London, raised concerns over exploitation with openDemocracy and said that the Christian Legal Centre "preys upon [families like Archie's] when they are absolutely at their most vulnerable." Professor Modi added that:

These third parties coming in are behaving appallingly, reprehensibly, unethically, and very damagingly. They add to the grief and distress of families because they try and break down the trust that should exist between the medical team and the family – and which usually does exist.

In August 2022, The Guardian ran analysis on how third parties can further complicate tragic life support cases in the context of the Archie Battersbee case. Legal affairs correspondent, Haroon Siddique, noted that: "recent years have brought increasing intervention by religious groups purporting to support parents but who have also been accused of inflaming tensions." Siddique's analysis concluded that "The involvement of such third-party ideologues presents a significant obstacle to the laudable aim of resolving such sensitive cases in a less adversarial manner."

=== MP's letter for treatment abroad ===
During court proceedings, a judge was told that James Duddridge, MP for the family's constituency, had written on their behalf to the Royal London Hospital on August 3. The letter lobbied for treatment abroad despite there being "no detail as to what is actually sought and where." A consultant paediatric neurologist told the court (via a written statement) that they were unaware of any treatment that could reverse the condition of Battersbee's brain. Duddridge has not confirmed if he is the author of the letter.

Speaking via the Science Media Centre, Professor Dominic Wilkinson, Professor of Medical Ethics and Consultant Neonatologist, University of Oxford stated that "there are no treatments in Japan or Italy or anywhere else that offer any prospect of helping Archie" adding that:

All the treatments overseas would do, would be to keep his physical body alive, while offering no possibility of him recovering. That is something the UK courts have carefully considered already and ruled out on the basis that this would be harmful to Battersbee, and not in his best interests.

=== GoFundMe page ===
In June 2022, Conservative MP for Southend West Anna Firth asked her Twitter followers to donate to a GoFundMe page connected to the case in a tweet that read, "The whole House is behind Archie and his family." Firth had also donated to the fundraiser. The fundraiser was launched by a Southend resident, although an update on the page stated that administrative control was given to Archie's sister-in-law. The fundraiser made clear that funds would be used for anything needed by the family and did not rule out donations to third parties.

On August 11, 2022, a statement from Christian Legal Centre's director, Andrea Minichiello Williams, stated that:

None of the GoFundMe donations have been or will be given to us. [...] The family, Christian Concern and the Christian Legal Centre have in no way made money from this legal case, nor have we received major funding from external groups or donors.

== Family campaigns ==
In August 2022, Hollie Dance called for unspecified legal changes and a public inquiry in the aftermath of her son's death. Dance also sought a meeting with UK Health Secretary, Steve Barclay, to discuss the perceived implications of the case. The content of her letter was released by Christian Concern.

== See also ==
- Charlie Gard case – cited in the 13 June and 1 August decisions
