= Robin Tolson =

English family court judge

His Honour Judge Robin Tolson KC

Family Court Judge
- Incumbent
- Assumed office 2015

Circuit Judge
- In office November 2014 – 2015

Personal details
- Spouse: Carol Tolson (d.2011)

Robin Stewart Tolson KC (born 1959) is a Family Court Judge sitting at the Central Family Court in London.

He was called to the bar in 1980. He took silk in 2001, practising at St John's Chambers in Bristol, and was a recorder from 2000 to 2014.

He was appointed a Circuit Judge on the South Eastern Circuit in 2014. In 2015, he was appointed to the Family Court sitting at the Central Family Court, Holborn, London.

== Notable cases ==
As the senior Family Court judge in central London, Tolson has presided over a number of celebrity divorce cases including that of Petra Ecclestone.

In 2016, Judge Tolson refused an application for divorce (‘Owens v Owens’) on the basis that the applicant, Mrs Tini Owens, had not demonstrated sufficient grounds for marital breakdown. His decision was upheld at appeal.

In 2019, Judge Tolson ruled that a litigant complaining of domestic rape had not been raped as she had not physically resisted her partner, despite having refused consent to sex. His judgment was overturned at appeal by Ms Justice Russell. Judge Tolson's outdated interpretation of the law on consent was widely criticised by victims' advocates including Dame Vera Baird, Nicole Jacobs, the Domestic Abuse Commissioner and Claire Waxman, the London Victims' Commissioner.

== Personal life ==
Tolson's wife Carol died in a skiing accident in 2011. There are two daughters.

In 2017, Judge Tolson was assaulted by an aggrieved litigant, Kevin Robinson.
