= Justice Newton =

Justice Newton may refer to:

- John E. Newton (judge) (1904–1984), justice of the Nebraska Supreme Court
- Richard Newton (justice) (died 1448), English chief justice of the Common Pleas
- Roderick Newton (born 1958), justice of the High Court of England and Wales
