= Jennifer Roberts =

Jennifer Roberts may refer to:

- Jennifer Roberts (judge) (1953–2024), judge of the High Court of England and Wales
- Jennifer Roberts (politician), American politician, businesswoman and diplomat
- Jennifer Roberts (art historian) (born 1969), American art historian
