= Lucy Theis =

British high court judge

The Honourable Mrs Justice Theis
- Royal coat of arms of the United Kingdom

Justice of the High Court
- Incumbent
- Assumed office 15 November 2010
- Appointed by: Elizabeth II

Personal details
- Born: 6 November 1960 (age 65)
- Education: University of Birmingham

Dame Lucy Morgan Theis DBE KC (born 6 November 1960), styled The Hon. Mrs. Justice Theis, is a judge of the High Court of England and Wales.

She was educated at the University of Birmingham (LLB, 1981). She was called to the Bar by Gray's Inn in 1982 and took Silk in 2003. She was appointed a Recorder in 2000 and was approved to sit as a deputy High Court Judge.

Between 2005 and 2010 she was the head of Field Court Chambers in London and was Chair of the Family Law Bar Association in 2008 until 2009. Theis was appointed to be a High Court Judge in 2010 and in 2011 she was appointed a Family Division Liaison Judge on the South Eastern Circuit, in this role There had responsibility for Kent, Surrey and Sussex and later for London and Thames Valley.

Since 2018 she has chaired the Family Procedure Rules Committee and the Family Justice Council and is the lead judge in relation to applications under the Human Fertilisation and Embryology Act 2008.

Mrs Justice Theis was appointed as the Senior Family Liaison Judge for a four-year period from October 2018.

== Notable cases ==
In August 2022, Theis heard one of the cases regarding Archie Battersbee and the withdrawal of his life support.
