= Alfie Evans case =

2018 UK legal case

Alfie Evans
- Born: Alfie James Evans; 9 May 2016; Toxteth, Liverpool, England, Alder Hey Children's Hospital
- Died: 28 April 2018 (aged 1 year 11 months); West Derby, Liverpool, England
- Parents: Thomas Evans (father); Kate James (mother)

Alfie James Evans (9 May 2016 – 28 April 2018), was an infant boy from Liverpool with an undiagnosed neurodegenerative disorder, later revealed to be GABA-transaminase deficiency. The medical team and the child's parents disagreed about whether to maintain his life support or to withdraw it, resulting in a legal battle. Alder Hey Children's NHS Foundation Trust sought a declaration that continued mechanical ventilation was "unkind and inhumane", and not in the child's best interests. Alfie's parents, Kate James and Thomas Evans, contested the application.

The ventilatory support was removed on 23 April 2018 following a series of unsuccessful appeals from Alfie's family. Alfie continued to breathe naturally for five days after the removal of his breathing tube. He died at 2:30 a.m. on 28 April 2018.

== Treatment ==
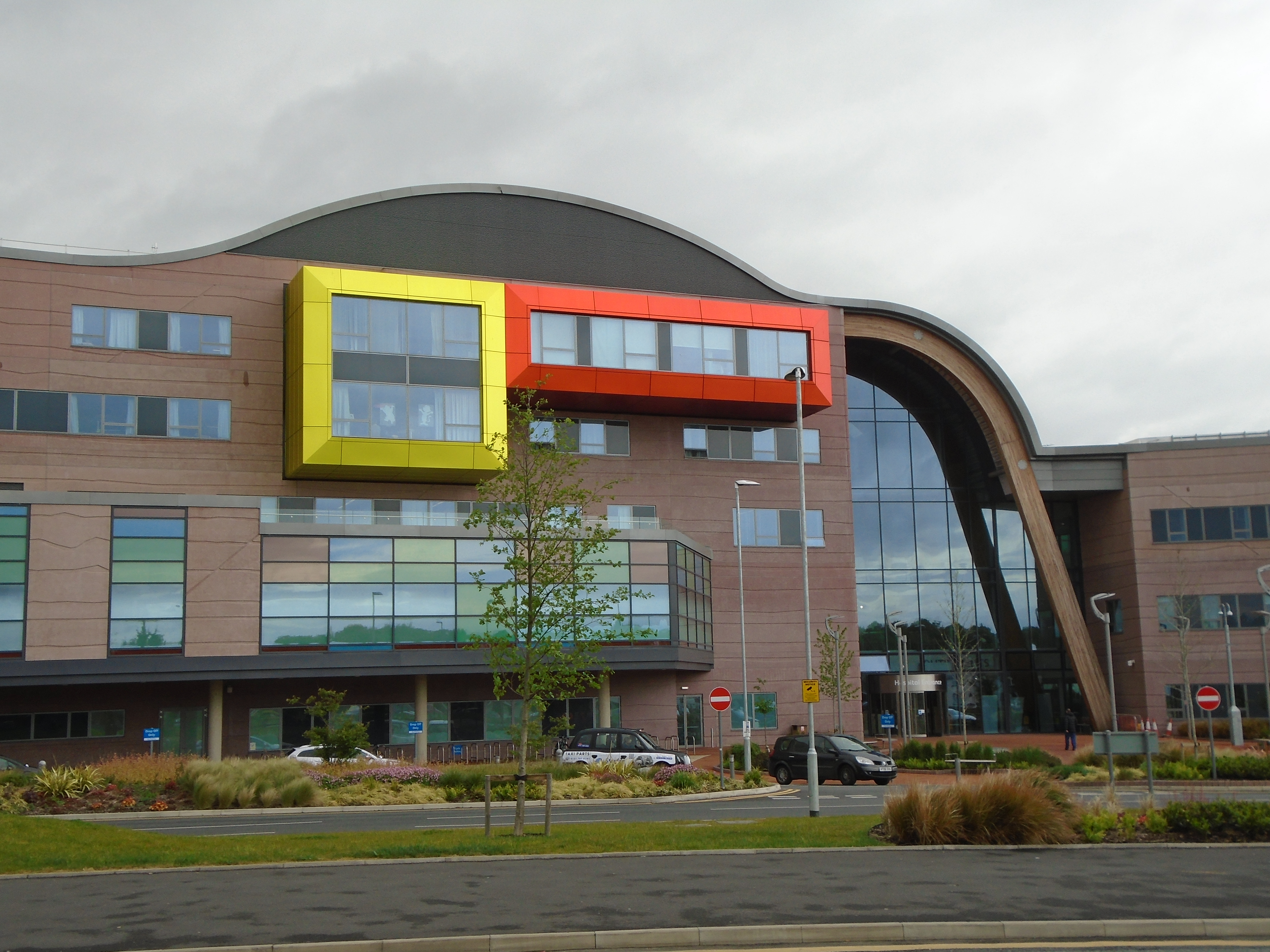
Alder Hey Children's Hospital, where Alfie Evans was treated from December 2016 until his death.

In November 2016, at six months of age, Alfie Evans was reviewed at the general pediatric outpatient clinic at Alder Hey Children's Hospital. He was found to be functioning in a range appropriate for a 6-week to 2-month-old infant. On 14 December 2016, Alfie was admitted to Alder Hey Accident and Emergency Department with a history of coughing, high temperature, and a reported episode of rhythmic jerking of his jaw and all four limbs. On 15 December, he showed sudden unprovoked movements compatible with infantile/epileptic spasms. An EEG performed on 16 December 2016 confirmed hypsarrhythmia. A further EEG was taken in January 2017 and "was markedly different, showing attenuation with little in the way of reactive response for protracted periods of time. Changes only really occurred when Alfie had an epileptic seizure."

Alfie's parents wished to remove him from Alder Hey and seek further care at the Bambino Gesù Hospital in Rome. In September 2017, Italian doctors from Bambino Gesù Hospital produced an assessment report on the possibility of transferring Alfie to Italy. According to their report on the case, they could offer prolonged ventilator support, with a surgical tracheostomy and would remove a nasogastric tube, replacing it with a gastrostomy. During assessment, Alfie suffered "epileptic seizures induced by proprioceptive stimuli", and the report warned that "with similar stimulations related to the transportation and flight, those seizures might induce further damage to the brain, [putting] the whole procedure of transportation at risk." Alfie remained in Alder Hey Hospital for the duration of 2017, with no improvement in his condition. At the end of the year, the hospital applied to have life support switched off.

== Publicity and public reaction ==
Alfie Evans' case drew significant public attention in the United Kingdom and overseas, with his parents establishing "Alfie's Army", an online campaign group dedicated to seeking further treatment and opposing the withdrawal of life support. Supporters established a petition on change.org, calling on Alder Hey Hospital to allow Alfie Evans to be transferred to a hospital of his parents' choice. His parents also approached Dr. Michio Hirano, a US-based neurologist who had offered treatment in the case of Charlie Gard. Alfie's parents claimed a parental right to make decisions about their son's care, arguing that the hospital itself should not be able to make care-decisions for their son without their consent.

Large protests emerged outside Alder Hey Hospital on 12 April after his family insisted on their right to take him home. On 16 April, Merseyside Police launched an investigation into "instances of verbal abuse and acts of intimidation" with judges raising concerns about threatening conduct by protesters towards hospital staff. Alfie's parents apologised, saying they did not intend to "harm or cause conflict or upset". Merseyside Police Chief Inspector Chris Gibson released a statement regarding social media posts regarding the Alder Hey Hospital and Alfie Evans's situation: "malicious communications and threatening behaviour will be investigated and, where necessary, will be acted upon."

=== Reactions from religious groups ===
On 18 April 2018 Alfie's father flew to Rome for a 20-minute meeting with Pope Francis. The case was commented on by the Pope via Twitter, who stated his "sincere hope that everything necessary may be done in order to continue compassionately accompanying little Alfie Evans, and that the deep suffering of his parents may be heard." He restated his support after the removal of life support, saying "Moved by the prayers and immense solidarity shown little Alfie Evans, I renew my appeal that the suffering of his parents may be heard and that their desire to seek new forms of treatment may be granted." Cardinal Pietro Parolin, Cardinal Secretary of State of the Holy See, criticized the decision to refuse the transfer of Evans to Italy, calling it "uncomprehensible".

Conversely, Cardinal Vincent Nichols, Archbishop of Westminster, defended the Hospital's decision, stating that the Church "says very clearly we do not have a moral obligation to continue a severe therapy when it’s having no effect, while the church’s catechism also teaches that palliative care, which isn’t a denial of help, can be an act of mercy". Nichols also criticized those who “used the situation for political aims”. The Cardinal's position received strong criticism, and Conservative MP Nadine Dorries stated that "bishops should hang their heads in shame”.

In October 2018, following an ad limina visit to the Vatican City, Archbishop Malcolm McMahon of Liverpool told The Tablet that Catholic Bishops of England and Wales had clarified their position to the Holy See.

The Church of England declined to comment on the issue.

=== Overseas support ===
The President of Poland Andrzej Duda also expressed his support. On 23 April, Alfie was granted Italian citizenship under the request of Brothers of Italy's leader Giorgia Meloni. The Italian Ministry of Foreign Affairs said it hoped Alfie would be allowed "immediate transfer to Italy".

== Legal proceedings ==
Alder Hey NHS Trust -v- Evans
- Court: High Court of Justice (Family Division)
- Decided: 20 February 2018 (High Court), 6 March 2018 (Court of Appeal)

On 19 December 2017, Alder Hey applied to the High Court to withdraw parental rights from Alfie's parents and to withdraw treatment by ventilation. The case was heard in public in the Family Division of the High Court in London. Alder Hey claimed that continuing life-support treatment would not be in the best interests of Alfie and sought declaration that it "is not lawful that such treatment continue". Lawyers acting on the hospital's behalf further claimed that further treatment for Alfie would be "unkind and inhumane". A doctor treating Alfie stated that there was "no hope" for the child, and that he was in a persistent vegetative state from a degenerative neurological condition that medics had not been able definitively to identify. The parents denied this, with Alfie's father claiming that his son "looks him in the eye" and "wants help".

The High Court ruled in favour of the hospital on 20 February 2018. In his judgement, the High Court judge stated that an MRI scan taken in February 2018 revealed that "[Alfie's] brain [was] entirely beyond recovery" and that "the brain was now only able to generate seizure" with "progressive destruction of the white matter of the brain which Dr R interpreted as now appearing almost identical to water and cerebrospinal fluid (CSF)." The court observed that the medical consensus, including of doctors asked to testify by the parents, was that Alfie had a fatal and untreatable condition, but they differed over the best course of action concerning his end-of-life care. Mr Justice Hayden concluded that "I am satisfied that continued ventilatory support is no longer in Alfie's best interest".

=== Appeals ===
Alfie's parents appealed against the decision in late February. On 6 March 2018, the Court of Appeal upheld the earlier ruling of the High Court. They stated that the High Court judge was "meticulous and thorough", and that medical evidence showed Alfie was "deeply comatose" and "to all intents and purposes unaware of his surroundings". The parents applied to the Supreme Court of the United Kingdom on 20 March 2018, which refused permission for another appeal. On 28 March 2018 the European Court of Human Rights ruled the case inadmissible, finding no arguable violation of human rights.

In a High Court judgement of 11 April 2018, the judge remarked that "by the end of February the connective pathways within the white matter of the brain which facilitate rudimentary sensation — hearing, touch, taste and sight, had been obliterated. They were no longer even identifiable on the MRI scan". The High Court backed an end-of-life care plan drawn up by medical specialists attached to Alfie Evans's case.

Alfie's father said that Alfie was wrongly "detained" at Alder Hey. Mr Justice Hayden dismissed that complaint, and appeal judges upheld his decision. On 17 April 2018 Tom Evans and Kate James asked the Supreme Court to consider their case again. Their application to appeal was refused on 20 April 2018. The justices wrote, "Alfie looks like a normal baby, but the unanimous opinion of the doctors who have examined him and the scans of his brain is that almost all of his brain has been destroyed. No-one knows why. But that it has happened and is continuing to happen cannot be denied. [...] there is no hope of his ever getting better." The European Court of Human Rights again determined their appeal on these grounds to be inadmissible.

The case concerned the family's argument that prevention of Alfie's transfer from Alder Hey Hospital constituted deprivation of liberty and a violation of Article 5 (right to liberty and security) of the European Convention on Human Rights. The decision resulted in a protest of at least 200 people taking place outside of Alder Hey hospital.

=== Withdrawal of life support ===
On 23 April, it was reported that Alfie's life support had been withdrawn. Alfie continued to breathe after the removal of his breathing tube, although his parents gave conflicting reports, at one time claiming they needed to perform mouth-to-mouth resuscitation. Other than a post on social media, no evidence of mouth-to-mouth ever being performed has ever been made public. Alfie's father stated to the media the next morning that Alfie had been breathing unassisted since shortly after life-support had been withdrawn, and that life-support should be reinstated. The evening of the same day, Mr Justice Hayden rejected the parents' appeal for permission to fly their son to a hospital in Italy. The judge concluded how previously he had come, "the consensus of every doctor from every country who had ever evaluated Alfie's condition, to the inevitable conclusion (following 7 days of evidence) that Alfie's brain had been so corroded by his Neurodegenerative Brain Disorder that there was simply no prospect of recovery. By the time I requested the updated MRI scan in February, the signal intensity was so bright that it revealed a brain that had been almost entirely wiped out. In simple terms the brain consisted only of water and CSF. [...] All that could be offered by the Bambino Gesu Hospital in Rome was an alternative palliative care plan." According to the Liverpool Echo, Alfie's father told reporters later that evening that the court had said it could set aside three judges that evening to hear his case again. On 25 April, the appeal was rejected.

Alfie's father sought to issue a private prosecution alleging "conspiracy to murder" against several staff members at Alder Hey. A statement had been prepared by Pavel Stroilov of the Christian Legal Centre but was rejected by a district judge. On 26 April, Tom Evans issued a statement, thanking supporters and staff at Alder Hey Hospital. He stated the family wished to "form a relationship, build a bridge and walk across it" with the hospital where their son has been treated and work with the treating team on a "plan that provides our boy with the dignity and comfort that he needs".

== Outcome ==
Alfie died at 2:30 a.m. on 28 April 2018. Later that day his father, Tom Evans, released a statement on Facebook announcing his death: "My gladiator lay down his shield and gained his wings... absolutely heartbroken."

== Summary of judgments ==
Court	Judge(s)	Opinion	Date
EWHC (Fam) (England) (Wales)	Mr Justice Hayden	Alfie needs palliative care, no hope of survival.	20 February
EWCA (Civ) (England) (Wales)	Lady Justice King; Lord Justice McFarlane; Lord Justice McCombe	Appeal dismissed.	6 March
UKSC (United Kingdom)	The Baroness Hale of Richmond (P); The Lord Kerr of Tonaghmore; Lord Wilson of Culworth	Permission to appeal refused.	20 March
ECHR (Europe)		Appeal inadmissible.	28 March
EWHC (Fam) (England) (Wales)	Mr Justice Hayden	Death is in Alfie's best interests. Father's hopes are unrealistic.	11 April
EWCA (Civ) (England) (Wales)	Lord Justice Davis; Lady Justice King; Lord Justice Moylan	Appeal dismissed.	16 April
ECHR (Europe)		Appeal inadmissible.	23 April
EWCA (Civ) (England) (Wales)	Lord Justice McFarlane; Lady Justice King; Lord Justice Coulson	Appeal dismissed.	25 April
