= Clive Lewis =

Clive Lewis may refer to:

- C. S. Lewis (Clive Staples Lewis, 1898–1963), British writer
- Clive 'Crash' Lewis, musician in Goteki and Sneaky Bat Machine
- Clive Derby-Lewis (1936–2016), South African politician
- Clive Lewis (judge) (born 1960), judge of the High Court of England and Wales
- Clive Lewis (footballer) in FA Youth Cup Finals of the 1950s
- Clive Lewis (politician) (born 1971), British Member of Parliament
- Clive Lewis (business psychologist) (born 1969)

== See also ==
- Lewis Clive (1910–1938), British rower
