= Dervilla Mitchell =

Irish engineer (born 1958)

Dame Dervilla Mitchell DBE FREng FIEI
- Born: August 1958 (age 67–68); Ireland
- Education: University College Dublin, Trinity College Dublin
- Known for: Project management of London Heathrow Airport's Terminal 5
- Awards: FREng (2005); Honorary CBE (2014); RAEng President's Medal (2020)
- Scientific career
- Fields: Civil engineering
- Workplaces: Arup UK

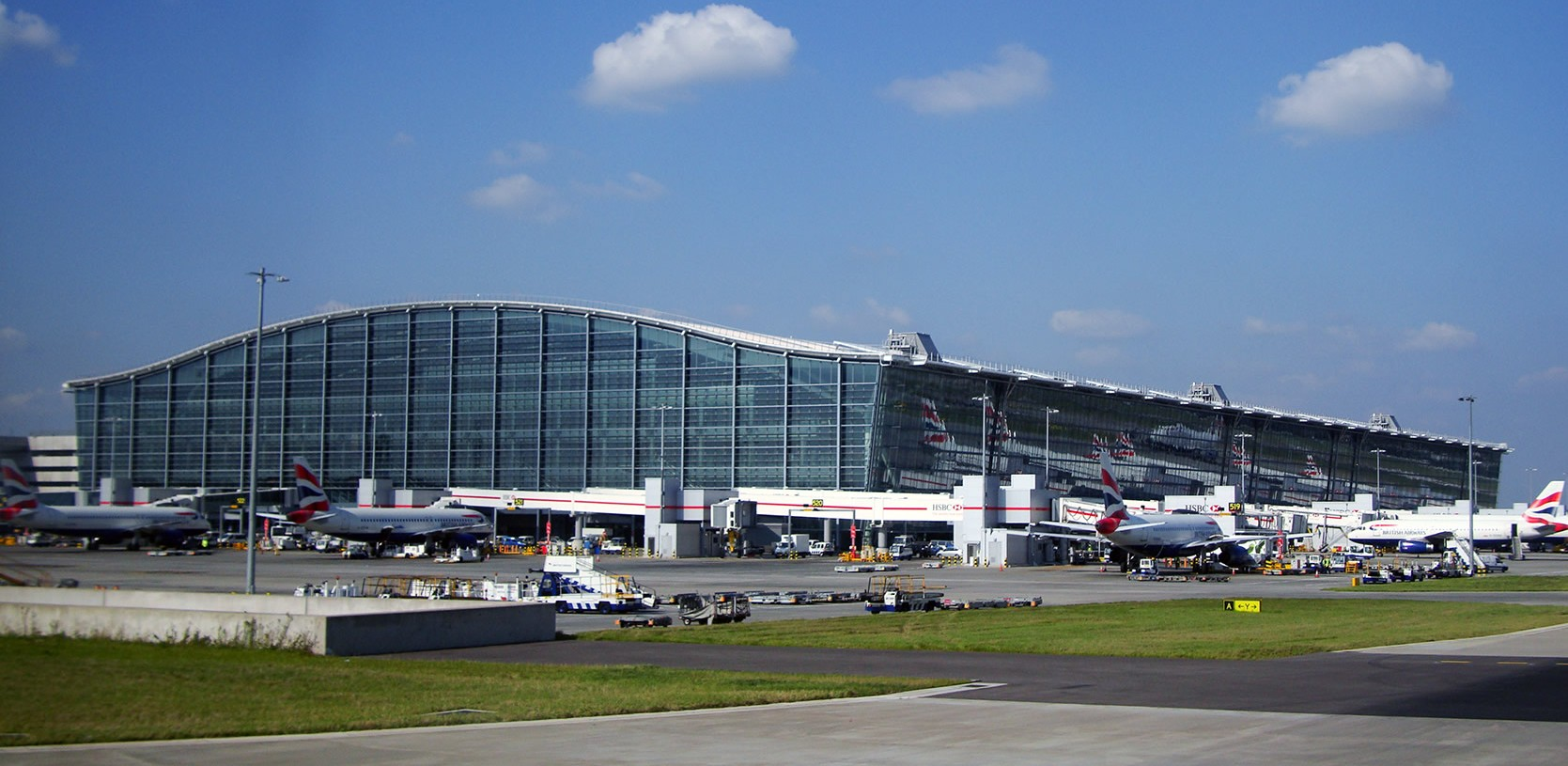
Heathrow Terminal 5, one of Mitchell's major projects

Dame Dervilla Mary Mitchell DBE FREng FIEI (born August 1958) is an Irish engineer and a director and joint deputy chair of Arup Group. She led the management of the design for London Heathrow Airport's Terminal 5, and as of 2019 was project director for Arup for a 2-billion dollar airport terminal development in Abu Dhabi. She is a Fellow of two national engineering academies, and the holder of an Honorary CBE.

== Early life and education ==
Mitchell was born in August 1958 and grew up in Dublin, Ireland. Her father Thomas Austin was an architect, and her grandfather Tony Woods and three of her uncles were engineers. She was educated at Pembroke School and St Conleth's College. She gained a degree in Civil Engineering from University College Dublin in 1980, and later a Diploma in Project Management from Trinity College Dublin.

== Career ==
Mitchell joined Arup Group in Dublin after graduating. She moved to Massachusetts in 1984 to work with Weidlinger Associates and then returned to Arup's London office in 1986. She has worked on projects including Portcullis House at Westminster, Action Stations for the Portsmouth Historic Dockyard, the London 2012 Olympic Village, and Heathrow Terminal 5 where she was Head of Design Management for the project. Mitchell joined the board of Arup in 2014 and was then described as "the most senior female in the business". In 2017 she became Chair of Arup's UK, India, Middle East and Africa (UKIMEA) Region, and in 2021 joint deputy chair of Arup Group.

== Recognition ==
Mitchell is a Fellow of the Royal Academy of Engineering, a Fellow of the Institution of Engineers of Ireland, and a Fellow of the Irish Academy of Engineering. In 2014, she was appointed an Honorary Commander of the Order of the British Empire (CBE) - honorary because she is not a British or Commonwealth citizen. In 2016, University College Dublin awarded her an honorary Doctorate of Science. In 2020, she was awarded the RAEng President's medal.

== Personal life ==
Mitchell is married and has three children, has been a local school governor, and enjoys cycling. She lives in Fulham.
