= Laurent Stefanini =

French diplomat

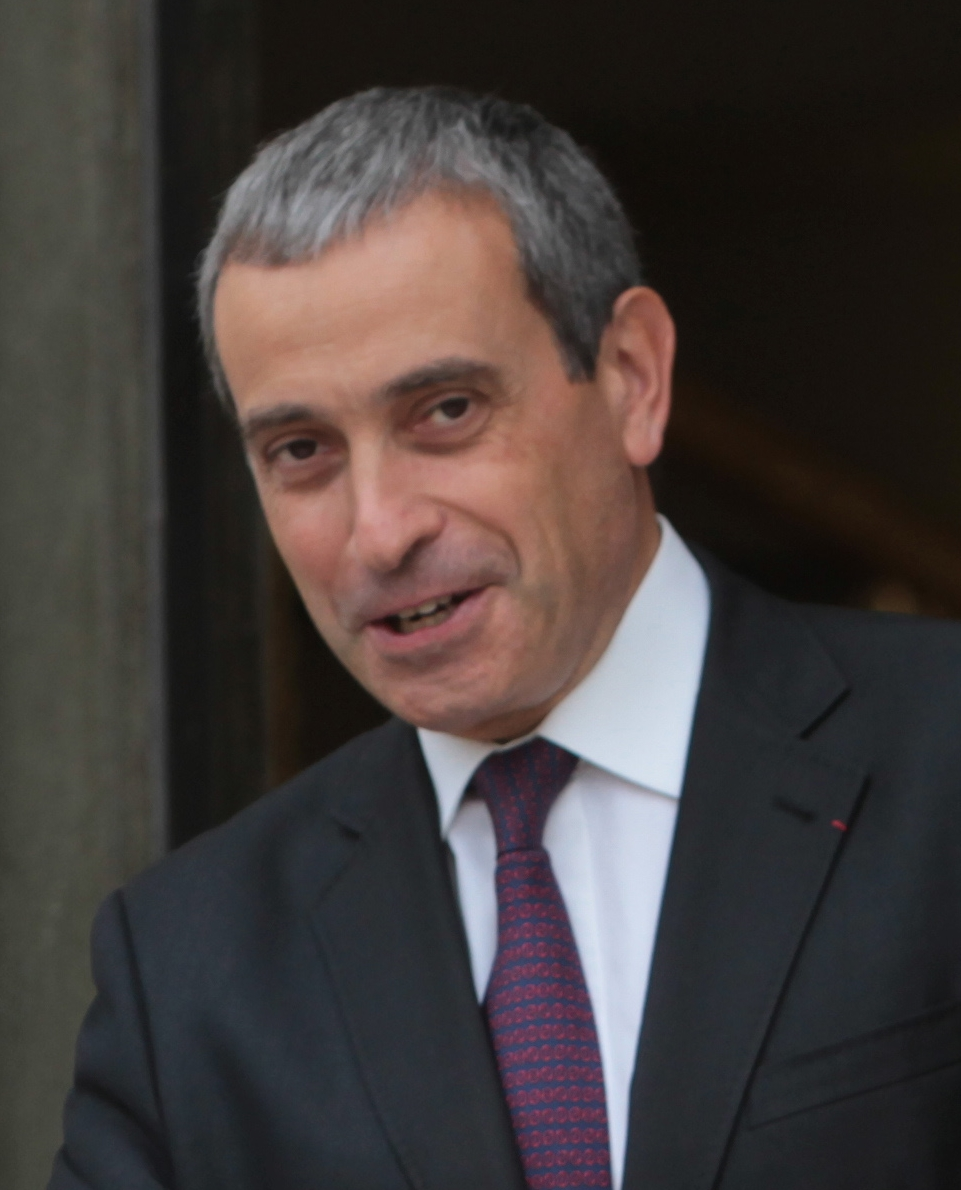

Ambassador of France to Monaco
- In office 2019 – 2023

Personal details
- Born: August 15, 1960 (age 66)
- Education: Paris Institute of Political Studies

Laurent Stefanini (born August 15, 1960) is a French diplomat who has served as Ambassador of France to Monaco.

== Biography ==
=== Early life ===
The son of a lawyer working in the chemical industry and housewife from Aubusson, Stefanini grew up in Saint-Germain-en-Laye.

He studied at the Institute of Political Studies in Paris and the Institute of American Studies in New York, and later graduated from the National School of Administration in France in 1985.

After 4 years directing judicial affairs (human rights and disarmament, maritime and Antarctic law) and then as the general secretary of the French Ministry of Foreign Affairs, in 1989 he became the first secretary to the permanent mission of France to the United Nations, dealing with questions of military disarmament.

=== Career ===
1992 to 1996: He was the assistant director of Economic and Financial Affairs of Quai d'Orsay on questions of the environment, transportation, telecommunication, and energy.

1996 to 2001: He served as Deputy Chief of Protocol.

2001 to 2005: He was the Counselor Minister at the French Embassy to the Holy See, and on his departure was made Commander with a plaque of the Order of Saint George the Great by Pope John Paul II.

March 2005 to October 2006: Stefanini was the counsellor for religious affairs to the minister of foreign affairs. From October 2006 to April 2010, he was the French ambassador for questions of the environment, responsible for international negotiations in this domain, in particular ocean biodiversity. From May 2010 to April 2016, he was the Chief of Protocol for the French Republic and also responsible for the travel of the Prime Minister abroad, as well as coordinating travel of foreign heads of state when visiting France and diplomatic summits held in France. As such, he was the secretary general of the French presidency of the G20 and the G8.

Fall 2015: In October, Stefanini was refused his appointment to the French Embassy in the Vatican. Some suggest this is due to the French government's failure to comply with the correct procedures; others claim he was denied the post because of his sexual orientation. Instead, he continued his role as the Chief of Protocol and preparing the Courget COP 21 (climate change) from November–December 2015.

April 2016: He took up his duties as a permanent delegate of France to UNESCO, replacing Philipe Lalliot.

October 2016: He voted that France abstain from the controversial decision around holy places in Jerusalem.

August 6, 2019: He was appointed Ambassador of France to Monaco.

== Works ==
In October 2016, Laurent Stefanini published a book to tell 500 years of French history through great meals, titled At the table with diplomats.

== Distinctions ==
=== French ===
- Officer of the National Order of Merit
- Commander of the Academic Palms
- Commandeur and member of the Council of the Order of Arts and Letters
- Agricultural Merit Officer
- Maritime Merit Officer
- National Defense Medal

=== Foreign ===
Laurent Stéfanini holds numerous foreign orders:

- Commander with the Plaque of the Order of Saint Gregory the Great (February 11, 2005 by Pope John Paul II)
- Commander of the Order of Merit of the Italian Republic (2012)
- Commander of the Polish Renaissance Order (March 2013))
- Officer of the Order of Grimaldi (November 22, 2013)
- Grand Officer of the Order of the Star of Italy (2013)
- Honorary Knight Commander of the Order of St Michael and St George (2014)

== Notes ==
This article was translated from the same article on French Wikipedia.
