= Stephen Phillips (judge) =

British judge

The Right Honourable Lord Justice Phillips
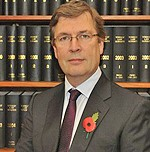

Lord Justice of Appeal
- Incumbent
- Assumed office 2020
- Monarchs: Elizabeth II; Charles III

Justice of the High Court
- In office 2013–2020

Personal details
- Born: 10 October 1961 (age 65)
- Education: University College, Oxford

Sir Stephen Edmund Phillips (born 10 October 1961), styled The Rt Hon Lord Justice Stephen Phillips, is a judge of the Court of Appeal having previously served as a judge of the High Court of England and Wales.

He was educated at The King's School, Chester, and University College, Oxford.

He was called to the bar by Gray's Inn in 1984 and became a bencher there in 2006. He was made a QC in 2002, served as a deputy judge of the High Court from 2008 to 2013, and was appointed a judge of the High Court of Justice (Queen's Bench Division) in 2013, receiving the customary knighthood in the 2014 Special Honours. He was appointed a Lord Justice of Appeal on 13 January 2020 and sworn in as a member of the Privy Council of the United Kingdom.

On 1 August 1998, at St Mark's Church in Worsley, Lancashire Phillips married Sonia Tolaney KC, a barrister of Middle Temple and One Essex Court. She is 13 years his junior. Her parents were GPs in Lancashire and she has a sister called Sapna. They have two children.
