= Alison Russell =

British judge (born 1958)

Dame Alison Russell DBE
- Royal coat of arms of the United Kingdom

Justice of the High Court
- In office 13 January 2014 – 2 October 2024
- Monarch: Charles III

Personal details
- Born: Alison Hunter Russell; 17 June 1958 (age 68) Harrogate, England
- Education: Polytechnic of the South Bank
- Occupation: Judge
- Profession: Barrister

Dame Alison Hunter Russell, DBE (born 17 June 1958), is a retired judge of the High Court of England and Wales.

== Early life and education ==
Russell was born in 1958 in Harrogate to a Scottish family. She was educated at Wellington School, Ayr and the Polytechnic of the South Bank.

== Career ==
Russell was called to the bar at Gray's Inn in 1983. She was appointed a recorder in 2004.

Russell became a King's Counsel in 2008. She practised at 1GC Family Law in London, specialising in family law and human rights.

Russell was appointed as a judge of the High Court of Justice on 13 January 2014, assigned to the Family Division. She became the first judge to be formally addressed as "Ms Justice".

Russell was made a Dame Commander of the Order of the British Empire in February 2014. She is a member of the Family Justice Council.

In April 2017, the Court of Appeal held that Russell had committed a series of "gross and obvious" irregularities in the way in which she had dealt with alleged contempt of court in a case about the alleged abduction of a child. Russell had imprisoned the father of the child for 18 months, holding that he had been in breach of an order which she had not in fact made, and did not have power to make. In doing so, she had made various serious procedural errors. The Court of Appeal awarded damages for wrongful imprisonment against the Lord Chancellor under the Human Rights Act 1998.

In May 2017, Russell allowed an appeal from a relocation decision of Her Honour Judge Owens in the Family Court at Oxford. However, in December 2017, the Court of Appeal held that Russell's decision was 'both wrong and unjust because of serious procedural irregularity', because the 'main basis on which the appeal was allowed by Russell J arose from a legal argument that had not been raised in the grounds of appeal, had not been addressed by either party, and was in any event incorrect'.

In 2020, Russell defamed a fellow judge, His Honour Judge Tolson QC, by falsely accusing him of endorsing the view that it is acceptable for sexual penetration to continue after the other party has said no.

In 2024, the Court of Appeal condemned Russell for her "blatantly unfair conduct of a hearing."

Russell retired on 2 October 2024.

== Personal life ==
Russell lives with her partner Julian Francis in South London.
