= Anthony Hayden =

The Honourable Mr Justice Hayden
- Coat of arms of the United Kingdom

Justice of the High Court
- Incumbent
- Assumed office 2013

Personal details
- Born: Anthony Paul Hayden; 24 June 1961 (age 65)

Sir Anthony Paul Hayden (born 24 June 1961), styled The Hon. Mr Justice Hayden, is a judge of the High Court of England and Wales and former barrister appointed to the High Court.

He was called to the bar at Middle Temple in 1987 and was appointed a Queen's Counsel (QC) in 2002. On 31 July 2013, he was appointed a judge of the High Court of Justice (Family Division) and invested with the customary knighthood in 2014.

In 2018 he presided the Alfie Evans case over the legal challenge by the parents of Alfie Evans against Alder Hey Children's Hospital.

In 2022, he was one of the judges to hear the Archie Battersbee case.
