= Pierre Sellal =

French diplomat (born 1952)

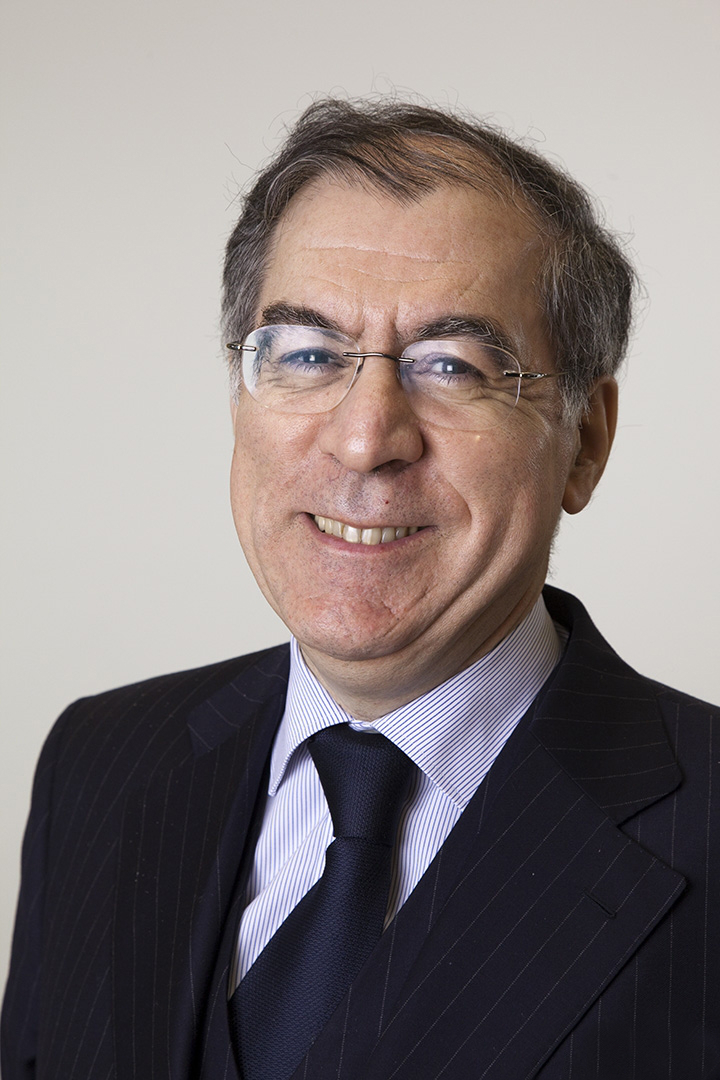

Permanent Representative of France to the European Union
- In office 2002–2009
- Preceded by: Pierre Vimont
- Succeeded by: Philippe Etienne
- In office 2014–2017
- Preceded by: Philippe Etienne
- Succeeded by: Philippe Léglise-Costa

Personal details
- Born: February 13, 1952 (age 74) Mulhouse

Pierre Sellal (born 13 February 1952) is a French diplomat.

== Biography ==
=== Early and personal life ===
Sellal was born on 13 February 1952.

After studying law at the University of Strasbourg, he passed the entrance exam for the École nationale d’administration (ENA) in 1973.

=== Career ===
After leaving the ENA, he joined the Ministry for Europe and Foreign Affairs. The first position he held concerned international economic relations in the UN. In 1981, he joined the Permanent Representation of France to the European Communities in Brussels.

In the summer of 2002, Sellal took up the post of Permanent Representative of France to the European Union for a second time. In the summer of 2014, Sellal took up the post for the second time.

He has been senior counsel at the August-Debouzy law firm since 31 January 2018.
