= Family Justice Council =

The Family Justice Council, established in 2004, is an advisory, non-statutory, non-departmental public body sponsored by the Judicial Office of England and Wales. It provides independent expert advice, from an inter-disciplinary perspective, on the operation and reform of the family justice system to the Family Justice Board (jointly chaired by ministers from the Ministry of Justice and Department for Education) and Government. It is chaired by the President of the Family Division and as of 2025, the chair is Sir Andrew McFarlane.

== History ==
In March 2002, the Lord Chancellor's office published a consultation titled "“Promoting Inter-Agency Working in the Family Justice System”. This consultation recommended that a council be established to improve interdisciplinary collaboration and best practice, whilst advising the government on matters impacting the family justice system. This recommendation was approved in 2003 and the Family Justice Council started to function in 2004.

In November 2011, a family justice review report was published. This highlighted a report previously written by the Family Justice Council, that raised concerns regarding the quality and qualifications of expert witnesses used within the family justice system. Further changes were recommended to the structure of the Family Justice Council within this report, with the Family Justice Council responding by subsequently making changes to their structure and how they function.

== Guidance ==
Guidance issued has included subjects such as neurodiversity, aiming to improve inclusion within the family justice system and hopes to assist neurodivergent people in gaining better access to justice, through improved best practice and guidance on tackling parental alienation increasingly being a counter allegation in response to claims of domestic violence, within the family justice system.

In 2025, guidance was issued on the subject of covert recordings in family court cases, which involve children and how admissible these are in such court cases. Upon publishing this guidance in May 2025, Sir Andrew McFarlane said "Whilst some covert recordings have been found to have evidential value, the secret nature of covert recordings can intrude on the privacy of parents, children and professionals, causing harm and often leading to concerns about the accuracy of the recording. It is hoped that this guidance will encourage professional bodies and organisations in the Family Justice System to consider developing their own guidance on the use of covert and overt recordings.”
