= Ian Dove =

British judge

The Right Honourable Lord Justice Dove

Lord Justice of Appeal
- Incumbent
- Assumed office 13 November 2025

High Court Judge King's Bench Division
- In office 2014–2025

Personal details
- Born: 31 December 1963 (age 62)
- Education: St Catherine's College, Oxford

Sir Ian William Dove (born 31 December 1963), styled The Rt Hon. Lord Justice Dove, is a judge of the Court of Appeal of England and Wales.

He was educated at Northampton School for Boys and St Catherine's College, Oxford.

He was called to the bar at Inner Temple in 1986. He was a judge of the High Court of Justice (King's Bench Division) from 2014 to 2025. From 2018 to 2021 he was a Presiding Judge on the Northern Circuit.

Dove was a practising barrister at No5 Barristers' Chambers before being appointed High Court Judge. He joined Chambers as a pupil in 1986 and was appointed Queen's Counsel in 2003. He was a barrister in the Planning & Environmental & Public Law fields during his time at No5.

In December 2018 he presided over a challenge made against the Government by Friends of the Earth that the National Planning Policy Framework (NPPF) document issued in July 2018 was unlawful because it should have been reviewed for its impacts on the environment.

On 2 October 2022, Sir Ian was appointed as President of the Immigration and Asylum Chamber in the Upper Tribunal.

Dove is a Bencher at the Inner Temple and from 2013 to 2014 was an Honorary Professor of Law at the University of Birmingham. In September 2016 he was made an Honorary Fellow of St Catherine's College, Oxford.

He was appointed a Lord Justice of Appeal and sworn of the Privy Council in December 2025.
