= Jennifer Roberts (judge) =

British judge (1953–2024)

The Honourable Mrs Justice Roberts
- Royal coat of arms of the United Kingdom

Justice of the High Court
- In office 3 June 2014 – 10 June 2024

Personal details
- Born: 3 March 1953 Southampton, England
- Died: 10 June 2024 (aged 71)
- Education: University of Southampton
- Occupation: Judge

Dame Jennifer Mary Roberts, DBE (née Halden; 3 March 1953 – 10 June 2024), styled The Hon. Mrs Justice Roberts, was a judge of the High Court of England and Wales.

Jennifer Mary Halden was born in Southampton on 3 March 1953. She was educated at the University of Southampton (LLB). She was called to the bar at Inner Temple in 1988. She was a judge of the High Court of Justice (Family Division) in 2014.

Roberts died of cancer on 10 June 2024, at the age of 71.
