= Andrew Moylan =

The Right Honourable Lord Justice Moylan

Lord Justice of Appeal
- Incumbent
- Assumed office 29 March 2017
- Monarchs: Elizabeth II; Charles III

Personal details
- Born: Andrew John Gregory Moylan; 23 June 1953 (age 73)
- Education: University of Oxford
- Occupation: Judge
- Profession: Law

Sir Andrew John Gregory Moylan (born 23 June 1953), is a British Court of Appeal of England and Wales judge.

== See also ==
- List of High Court judges of England and Wales
