= Eleanor King (judge) =

British judge (born 1957)

The Right Honourable Lady Justice King DBE
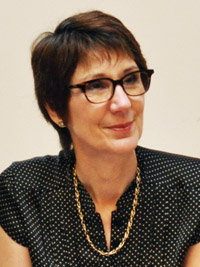
- King in 2014

Lady Justice of Appeal
- Incumbent
- Assumed office 2014

Justice of the High Court
- In office 2008–2014

Personal details
- Born: Eleanor Warwick Hamilton; 13 September 1957 (age 69) United Kingdom
- Education: Hull University

Dame Eleanor Warwick King DBE (née Hamilton; born 13 September 1957) is a British judge of the Court of Appeal of England and Wales.

== Biography ==
Born as Eleanor Warwick Hamilton (and known by her maiden name until being appointed as a judge), she was educated at Queen Margaret's School, York until 1973 and later at Hull University (LLB). She was called to the Bar, Inner Temple in 1979. She was an Assistant Recorder from 1996 to 2000.

She took silk in 1999 and was appointed as a deputy High Court judge and recorder. She was appointed as a High Court judge, assigned to the Family Division on 4 April 2008. In 2011 she was awarded an honorary PhD from Hull University in recognition of her work in the Law.

In 2014, she was appointed a Lady Justice of Appeal.

In 2021 Hull University invited her back as their most prestigious legal alumni to open a mock court room to be used by their law students. The university named the new room in her honour.

== Family ==
Lady Justice King's husband, Tom King, is also a Hull University law graduate (1973–1976). The couple have four daughters who also attended her former school.

== Affiliations ==
- Fellow of the International Academy of Matrimonial Lawyers
