= Roderick Newton =

Judge of High court of England and Wales

The Honourable Mr Justice Newton
- Royal coat of arms of the United Kingdom

High Court Judge Family Division
- Incumbent
- Assumed office 2014

Personal details
- Born: 15 April 1958 (age 68)
- Education: City of London Polytechnic

Sir Roderick Brian Newton (born 15 April 1958), styled The Hon. Mr Justice Newton, is a judge of the High Court of England and Wales.

He was educated at City of London Polytechnic.

He was called to the bar at Middle Temple in 1982. He has been a judge of the High Court of Justice (Family Division) since 2014.
