= Peter Jackson (judge) =

British judge

The Right Honourable Lord Justice Peter Jackson
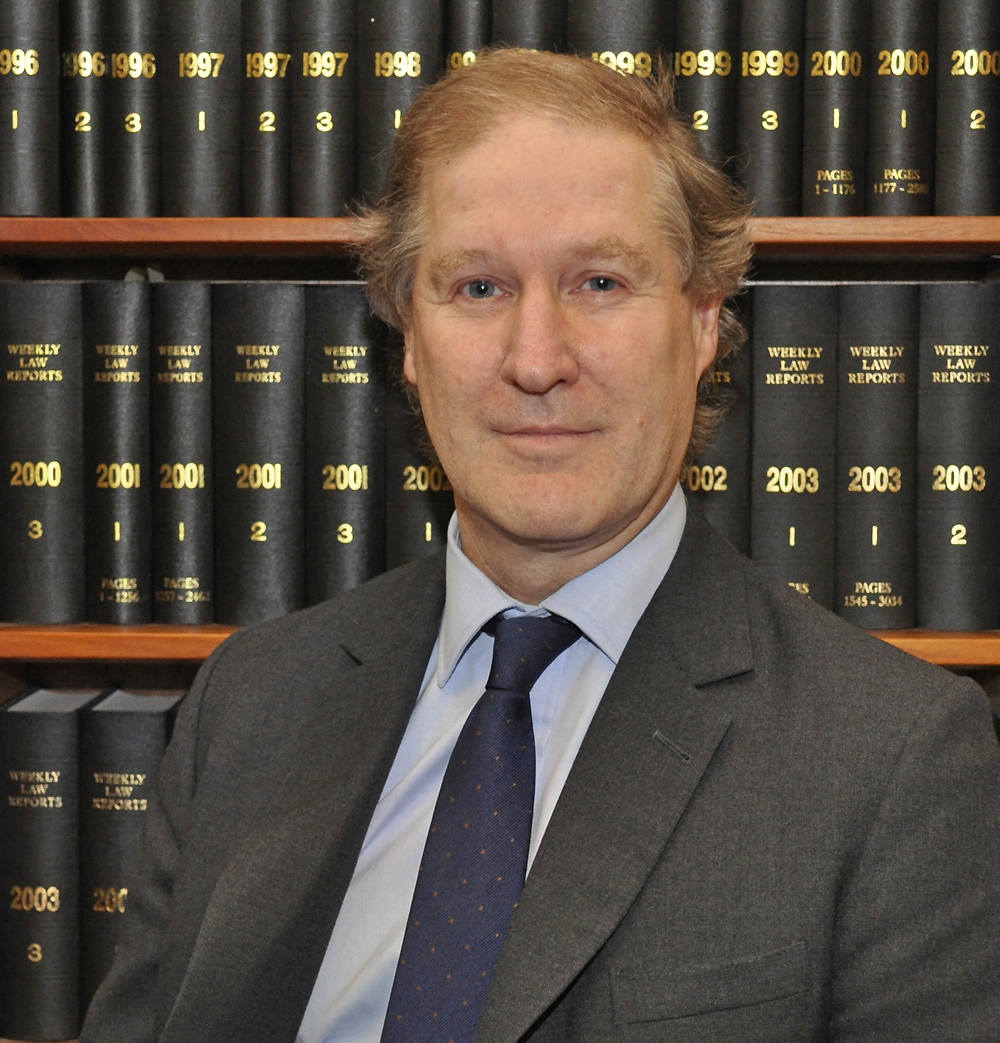
- Jackson in 2013

Lord Justice of Appeal
- Incumbent
- Assumed office 2017
- Monarchs: Elizabeth II; Charles III

High Court Judge Family Division
- In office 2010–2017

Personal details
- Born: 9 December 1955 (age 70) United Kingdom
- Education: Brasenose College, Oxford

Sir Peter Arthur Brian Jackson, PC (born 9 December 1955), styled The Rt Hon Lord Justice Peter Jackson, is an English Appeal Court judge. Previously he was a High Court Judge assigned to the Family Division.

== Career ==
Jackson was called to the Bar by the Inner Temple in 1978 and became a Queen's Counsel in 2000. He was subsequently appointed as a Recorder in 1998, a Deputy High Court Judge in 2003 and a High Court Judge with effect from 1 October 2010. Referring to his work as a barrister (not as a judge), Chambers & Partners described Jackson as a "master tactician [who] stalks his prey in a very subtle, understated manner... He plays to win and does so more often than not," while Legal 500 called him "one of the most authoritative children silks around."

=== Court of Protection ===
In February 2011, Jackson made a landmark ruling allowing journalists to attend hearings in the Court of Protection in a case about an autistic man who had been kept away from his home and family by a local authority, the London Borough of Hillingdon. He agreed to allow the news media to identify all parties in the case. Previously, the court had been widely criticised in the media for being able to make crucial rulings without public scrutiny.

=== Poppi Worthington case ===
In January 2016, Peter Jackson LJ issued a ruling which appeared at variance with the findings of police investigation which had resulted in no prosecution. Although there had been no prosecution the Judge found that the father had on the balance of probabilities abused the baby before her death. He criticised the Police and Social Services.

=== Judgment in plain English ===
In September 2016 Jackson was praised for rephrasing the entire judgement in the case of Lancashire County Council v M and Others into a 17-page document using simple phrases and emojis with the intention that the children involved would be able to read and comprehend it themselves. The ruling is thought to be the first in English legal history to incorporate an emoji, or web symbol, or to explain a point of evidence.

=== Cryonically frozen girl ===
In October 2016 Lord Justice Peter Jackson ruled on the case of a 14-year-old girl (referred to in the judgment as JS) dying of cancer. The judgment was technically that the mother should be allowed to decide about disposal of her body on death. Jackson visited the girl in hospital, at her request, shortly before her death.

=== Parental access to Haredi Jewish children ===
Jackson ruled 'with real regret' that the Court could not order parental access for a transgender parent of Haredi Jewish children.

=== Judgment in form of letter to a child ===
In July 2017, Jackson delivered a judgment in a case about the residence and citizenship of a teenage boy. He presented it in the form of a letter written directly to the boy, explaining how and why he had reached his decision in the case.
