= Clive Lewis (judge) =

British judge

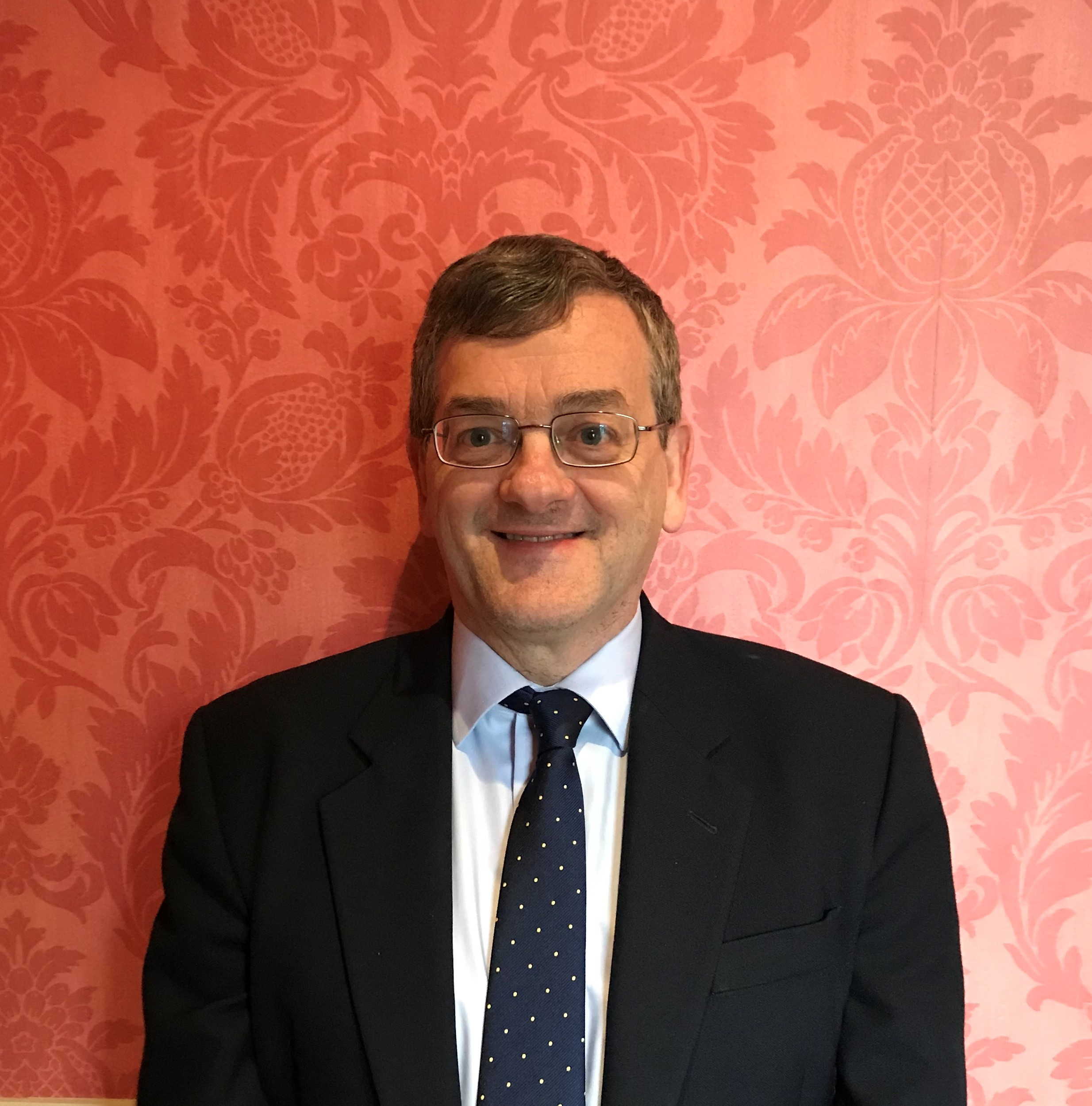
Lewis in 2020

Sir Clive Buckland Lewis FLSW (born 13 June 1960), styled The Rt Hon. Lord Justice Lewis, is a judge of the Court of Appeal of England and Wales, one of the Senior Courts of England and Wales.

He was educated at Cwmtawe Community School, Churchill College, Cambridge (BA, 1981) and Dalhousie University (LLM, 1983).

Lewis was a lecturer at the University of East Anglia and at University of Cambridge, where he was a fellow of Selwyn College, before being called to the bar at Middle Temple in 1987. He was appointed a Recorder in 2003 and was approved to sit as a deputy High Court judge in 2013. In 2006, he became a Queen's Counsel. On 13 June 2013, he was appointed a High Court judge, receiving the customary knighthood in the 2014 Special Honours, and assigned to the Queen's Bench Division. He was a Presiding Judge, Wales from 2016-2019. He also served as Deputy Chairman of the Boundary Commission for Wales.

In 2018, he was elected a Fellow of the Learned Society of Wales.

He was appointed a Lord Justice of Appeal in October 2020.

He is the author of Judicial Remedies in Public Law (6th. Ed.).

He is a member of the Athenaeum Club and the Royal Automobile Club.
