= Geraldine Andrews =

British High Court judge

The Right Honourable Lady Justice Andrews DBE, PC
- Royal coat of arms of the United Kingdom

Lady Justice of Appeal
- Incumbent
- Assumed office 1 October 2020
- Monarchs: Elizabeth II; Charles III

High Court Judge Queen's Bench Division
- In office 2013–2020

Personal details
- Born: 19 April 1959 (age 67)
- Education: King's College London

Dame Geraldine Mary Andrews, DBE, PC (born 19 April 1959), styled The Rt. Hon. Lady Justice Andrews, is a Lady Justice of Appeal of the Court of Appeal of England and Wales.

She was educated at King's College London (LLB with First-class honours, 1980; LLM, 1982; AKC). She was called to the bar at Gray's Inn in 1981 and practiced as a commercial barrister from Essex Court Chambers specialising in shipping and international trade. She became a bencher in 2004 and was appointed as Vice Treasurer at the Inn from 2024 before taking up role as Treasurer in 2025. She was made a QC in 2001, and a Recorder on the Midland Circuit from 2001, deputy judge of the High Court from 2006 to 2013, and judge of the High Court of Justice (Queen's Bench Division) since 2013.

She was appointed a Lady Justice of Appeal in October 2020. She sits in both criminal and civil appeals as well as in the Divisional Court. She is the co-author of Law of Guarantees (7th ed 2015).

Coat of arms of Geraldine Andrews

Notes
Displayed on a painted panel at Gray's Inn.
Escutcheon
On a lozenge Per saltire Sable and Gules a Griffin segreant holding with the forefeet a Harp Or between in pale two Stradivari Violin Bridges also Or and in fess two Chef’s Hats Argent issuant from the band of each a Shamrock slipped Vert.
Motto
Per Legere Ad Legem
