= Elisabeth Laing =

British judge

The Right Honourable Lady Justice Elisabeth Laing DBE
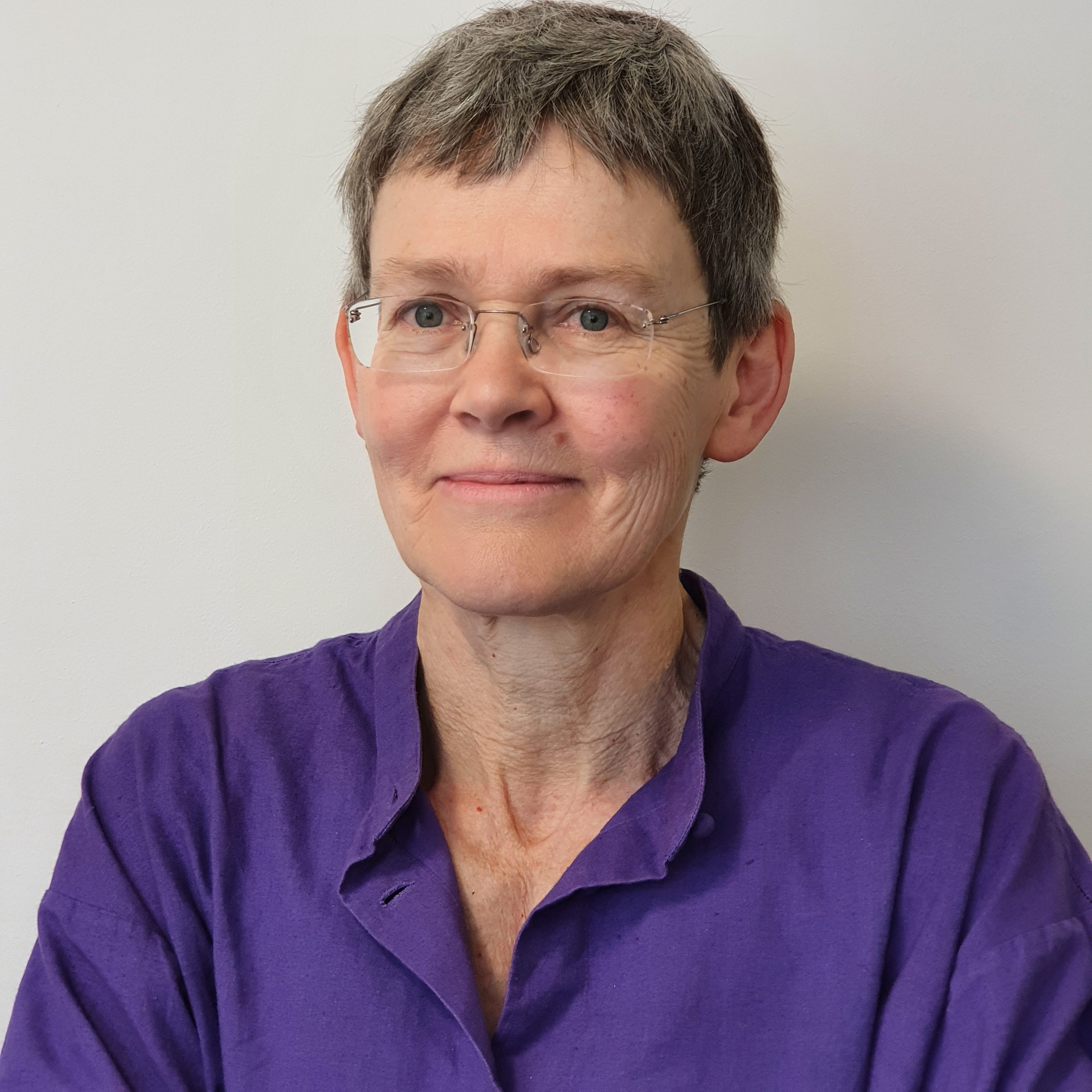
- Laing in 2021

Lady Justice of Appeal
- Incumbent
- Assumed office 28 October 2020
- Monarchs: Elizabeth II; Charles III

High Court Judge Queen's Bench Division
- In office 2014–2020

Personal details
- Born: Elisabeth Mary Caroline Laing; 19 November 1956 (age 69)

Dame Elisabeth Mary Caroline Laing, DBE (born 19 November 1956), styled The Rt. Hon. Lady Justice Elisabeth Laing, is a Lady Justice of Appeal of the Court of Appeal of England and Wales.

She was called to the bar at Middle Temple in 1980. A Recorder, and a former member of the Attorney General's Panel, she took Silk in 2008, and was appointed a Deputy High Court Judge in 2010. She was appointed to the Welsh Government's Panel of Queen's Counsel in 2012.

She has contributed to Halsbury's Laws, and to Supperstone, Goudie and Walker's Judicial Review. She was on the editorial board of Local Government Reports, and was a member of the BSB's Standards Committee and of the Committee of the BBA.

She has been a judge of the High Court of Justice (assigned to the Queen's Bench Division) since 2014. In January 2017, she was appointed Chairman of the Special Immigration Appeals Commission, the Pathogens Access Appeal Commission, and the Proscribed Organisations Appeal Commission. She was appointed to the Court of Appeal on 28 October 2020.

Lady Justice Elisabeth Laing served as a judge in the Court of Appeal for a Windrush case of Hubert Howard in July 2022.
