= Cocker Bar railway station =

Former railway station in England

Cocker Bar
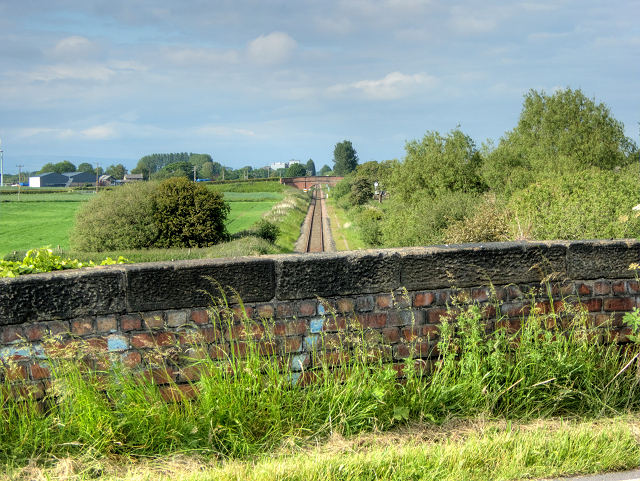
- Site of the station (2015)

General information
- Location: Ulnes Walton, Chorley; England
- Coordinates: 53.6902°N 2.7564°W
- Grid reference: SD501218

Other information
- Status: Disused

History
- Original company: East Lancashire Railway
- Pre-grouping: Lancashire and Yorkshire Railway

Key dates
- c 1849: Opened
- October 1859: Closed on the opening of Midge Hall
Location

Cocker Bar railway station was located in what is still open country where Cocker Bar Road (B5248) crosses what is now the Ormskirk Branch Line.

The station was closed when Midge Hall station opened 47 chains (0.95 km) further north in 1859, shortly after the line was taken over by the Lancashire and Yorkshire Railway.

== History ==
The railway line between Preston and Walton was proposed by the Liverpool, Ormskirk and Preston Railway (LO&PJ) and authorised in 1846; later that year the LO&PJ was amalgamated with the East Lancashire Railway (ELR), which opened the line in 1849.

In August 1859 the ELR was amalgamated with the Lancashire and Yorkshire Railway (LYR), and in October that year, the station at Midge Hall was opened. It was 23 1/4 miles (37.4 km) from Liverpool (Tithebarn Street), and replaced Cocker Bar. Sources differ slightly on distances. Marshall gives Midge Hall as 23 miles (37.0 km) from Liverpool and Cocker Bar quarter of a mile less. The Engineers' Line Reference data for line FCO separates the sites by 47 chains. Looking at the maps it would appear that Marshall's figure is rounded.

== Reopening proposals ==
There have been talks amongst the local community for the possible reopening of Midge Hall station, which was closed in 1961. Cocker Bar's site is green field, on a locally well connected B road and near Wymott and Garth prisons.

Preceding station	Disused railways	Following station
Preston; Line and station open	Lancashire and Yorkshire Railway; Ormskirk Branch Line	Croston; Line and station open
Lostock Hall; Line closed, station open	Lancashire and Yorkshire Railway; Ormskirk Branch Line	Croston; Line and station open
