= Andrew Edis =

British barrister and judge (born 1957)

The Right Honourable Lord Justice Edis
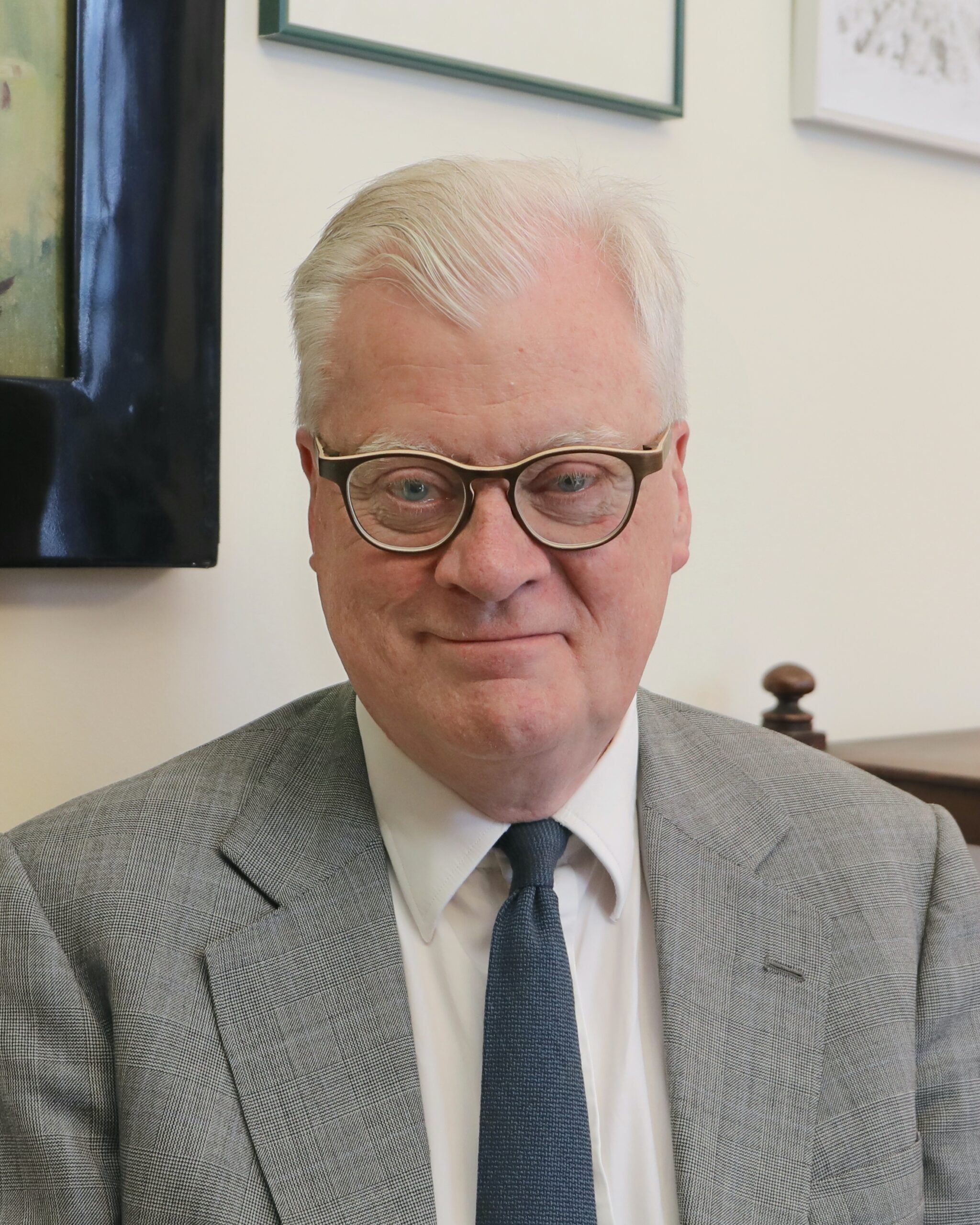

Senior Presiding Judge
- In office 1 October 2022 – 1 October 2024
- Preceded by: Sir Charles Haddon-Cave
- Succeeded by: Sir Nicholas Green

Lord Justice of Appeal
- Incumbent
- Assumed office 27 January 2021
- Monarchs: Elizabeth II; Charles III

High Court judge Queen's Bench Division
- In office 1 October 2014 – 27 January 2021
- Monarch: Elizabeth II

Personal details
- Born: 9 June 1957 (age 69)
- Education: University College, Oxford
- Occupation: Barrister, judge

Sir Andrew Jeremy Coulter Edis PC (born 9 June 1957), styled The Rt Hon. Lord Justice Edis, is a Lord Justice of Appeal, who served as the Senior Presiding Judge having previously served as a High Court Judge.

== Early life and education ==
Edis studied at Liverpool College and University College, Oxford.

== Legal career ==
He was called to the Bar in 1980. He became an Assistant Recorder in 1994, a Deputy High Court Judge in 2001, Bencher of Middle Temple in 2004 and Senior Treasury Counsel in 2008.

Edis has been ranked by Chambers and Partners and The Legal 500 as a top advocate in crime.

His work has included high-profile cases that have been featured in national newspapers such as The Independent and by the BBC. For example, he defended in the 2005 Lady in the Lake trial. He has also undertaken book reviewing for the Times Higher Education Supplement.

Edis was counsel for the ultimately successful prosecution in R v Huhne, the trial of former British Secretary of State for Energy and Climate Change Chris Huhne MP and his former wife, Vicky Pryce for perverting the course of justice in relation to a 2003 speeding case. In May 2013, Edis was lead prosecutor in the trial of Jiervon Bartlett and Nayed Hoque, who were accused of the murder of Paula Castle after allegedly mugging her in Greenford; they later pleaded guilty to manslaughter. In late 2013, Edis was the lead prosecutor in the News of the World newspaper phone-hacking scandal trial, R v Brooks, Coulson and six others.

Edis was appointed a Justice of the High Court on 1 October 2014 and knighted. He became a Lord Justice of Appeal on 27 January 2021.

In his spare time, Edis is a cricketer and was one of the founding members of the Liverpool Bar Cricket Club, once taking career figures of 7–12 in their annual fixture against the Inn at Whitewell.

=== Notable cases ===
- 2015 Shoreham Airshow crash
- Essex lorry deaths
- Joseph McCann (criminal)
- Killing of Andrew Harper
- Lady in the Lake trial
- Murder of Dorothy Woolmer
- Murder of Shafilea Ahmed
- News International phone hacking scandal
- R v Huhne
