= Gordon Park =

Gordon Park may refer to:

== Places ==
- Gordon Park, Cleveland, a city park located on the lakefront
- Gordon Park, Milwaukee, a county park in Milwaukee, Wisconsin, USA
- Gordon Park, Queensland, a suburb of Brisbane, Australia
- Gordon Park, Zimbabwe

== People ==
- Lady in the Lake trial, a 1976 murder and 2005 trial in which Gordon Park (1944–2010) was convicted of murder and jailed for life
- Gordon L. Park (1937–2010), petroleum engineer, geologist and politician in Wyoming

== See also ==
- Gordon Parks (1912–2006), American photographer
