= Lord Green =

Lord Green may refer to:

- Andrew Green, Baron Green of Deddington (born 1941), British diplomat
- Stephen Green, Baron Green of Hurstpierpoint (born 1948), British politician, banker and priest

== See also ==
- Lord Greene (disambiguation)
- Nicholas Green (judge), Lord Justice Green
