= Amanda Yip =

British judge

The Right Honourable Lady Justice Yip DBE
- Royal coat of arms of the United Kingdom

Lady Justice of Appeal
- Incumbent
- Assumed office 2 October 2025
- Monarch: Charles III

High Court Judge King's Bench Division
- In office 2017–2025
- Monarchs: Elizabeth II; Charles III

Personal details
- Born: Amanda Louise Kay Liverpool, England
- Parent: John Kay (father)
- Relatives: Ben Kay (brother)
- Education: Merchant Taylors' Girls' School
- Alma mater: Emmanuel College, Cambridge
- Occupation: Lawyer, judge

Dame Amanda Louise Yip DBE (née Kay) is a Lady Justice of Appeal of the Court of Appeal of England and Wales. Born in Liverpool, she is the daughter of Sir John Kay, a Lord Justice of Appeal.

She was educated at Merchant Taylors' Girls' School and Emmanuel College, Cambridge, where she studied law and graduated with a Bachelor of Arts degree in 1990. She was called to the bar by Gray's Inn in 1991 and practised at Exchange Chambers in Liverpool, specialising in personal injury and clinical negligence work. She was appointed a recorder in 2009, Queen's Counsel in 2011, and a deputy High Court judge in 2013.

Yip was appointed a justice of the High Court in 2017, on the retirement of Mr Justice Wyn Williams, and assigned to the Queen's Bench Division. She received the customary appointment as a Dame Commander of the Order of the British Empire the same year. This appointment was published in The London Gazette on 1 December 2017.

She was appointed an Ordinary Judge of the Court of Appeal on 2 October 2025.

On 14 April 2026, it was announced that Yip had been appointed Senior Presiding Judge for England and Wales from 1 October 2026 for a 2 year term, succeeding Lord Justice Green.

== Notable cases ==
Cases heard by Yip include:

- R v Cashman (Murder of Olivia Pratt-Korbel)
- R v Jenkinson and Ratcliffe (Murder of Brianna Ghey)
