= Crown Court Bench Division =

Proposed tier of the Judiciary of England and Wales

The Crown Court Bench Division (CCBD) is a proposed tier of the Judiciary of England and Wales. It would stand above magistrates' courts but below Crown Court.

The creation of the tier was proposed by Brian Leveson in July 2025 as part of his proposals to reduce the backlog of cases facing the Crown Court. In November 2025 it formed part of plans circulated in an internal government briefing for government departments.

The tier would see defendants tried before judges without a jury in cases in which a sentence below five years is expected.

== Reception ==
The proposal was rejected by the chair of the Criminal Bar Association, Riel Karmy-Jones KC, who said that it was not a 'magic pill' and that the consequences would be to "destroy a criminal justice system that has been the pride of this country for centuries, and to destroy justice as we know it. Juries are not the cause of the backlog. The cause is the systematic underfunding and neglect that has been perpetrated by this government and its predecessors for years". The Leader of the Opposition Kemi Badenoch described it as a "short term decision that risks fairness, undermines public trust, and erodes the very foundation of our justice system".
