= Investigatory Powers Commissioner =

United Kingdom survailance watchdog

- Incumbent; The Lord Leveson of Liverpool since October 2019
- Investigatory Powers Commissioner's Office
- Abbreviation: IPC
- Appointer: Prime Minister
- Term length: 3 years, renewable
- Constituting instrument: Investigatory Powers Act 2016
- Formation: 3 March 2017
- Deputy: Deputy Investigatory Powers Commissioner
- Website: https://www.ipco.org.uk/

The investigatory powers commissioner (IPC) is an "arms-length" public official in the United Kingdom who oversees the use of investigatory powers of public authorities such as police and law enforcement agencies, intelligence services, local councils and prisons. They lead the Investigatory Powers Commissioner's Office (IPCO) and are assisted in their functions by judicial commissioners, who are all required to have held high judicial office.

Since 2019 the investigatory powers commissioner has been Lord Brian Leveson.

== Formation ==
The role of the investigatory powers commissioner was created in the Investigatory Powers Act 2016 in order to provide independent oversight of the use of investigatory powers. It merged the previous offices of the Office of the Surveillance Commissioners, the Interception of Communications Commissioner’s Office and the Intelligence Service Commissioner’s Office into one office with oversight over these areas along with the Office for Communications Data Authorisations. The first IPC, Sir Adrian Fulford, was appointed in 2017.

== Role ==
The investigatory powers commissioner is appointed by the prime minister for a term of 3 years, which can be renewed, they are typically a former or current senior judge.

The investigatory powers commissioner and their office carry out their functions of ensuring the use of investigatory powers used by public authorities are lawful and necessary, independently of the Government and although it works closely with it is not part of the Home Office. However, funding for IPCO is made available by the home secretary. The commissioners annual report is submitted directly to the prime minister.

As part of the oversight powers of the IPC and their office, they have the power to inspect the use of investigatory powers of public bodies authorised to use them. Each inspection team is heading by a chief inspector.

Agencies wishing to use certain intrusive investigatory powers such as targeted interception and intrusive surveillance require the authorisation of a judicial commissioner of the IPCO, this is known as the "double-lock" and ensures a check and balance on the use of intrusive investigatory powers.

Any warrant issued by a secretary of state, minister or chief officer authorising the surveillance or interception of information must be approved by a judicial commissioner from the IPCO, and must meet the criteria necessary to authorise the warrant.

Their remit extends to the oversight of investigatory powers of over 600 UK public bodies including:

- Security Service (MI5)
- Government Communications Headquarters (GCHQ)
- Secret Intelligence Service (MI6)
- National Crime Agency (NCA)
- Counter-Terrorism Policing
- Territorial Police Forces (England and Wales)
- His Majesty’s Revenue and Customs (HMRC)
- Police Service Northern Ireland
- Police Scotland
- Metropolitan Police Service
- Ministry of Defence
- His Majesty's Prison Service
- Local Authorities

Other public bodies the IPCO oversee include various other Police, Law Enforcement Agencies and public authorities.

== Judicial commissioners ==
The investigatory powers commissioner is assisted in their role by judicial commissioners, to be appointed as a judicial commissioner a person must have held judicial high office, as outlined under the Constitutional Reform Act 2005. There are currently 14 judicial commissioners in the IPCO.

The IPC may appoint no more than two judicial commissioners to serve as deputy investigatory powers commissioner, while being DIPC they continue to be a judicial commissioner.

The current DIPC is Sir John Goldring

== List of investigatory powers commissioners ==
Portrait	Name	Term	Prime Minister (who appointed)	Experience
	Sir Adrian Fulford	3 March 2017 – 21 October 2019	Theresa May	High Court judge; Judge of the ICC; Lord Justice of Appeal
	Sir Brian Leveson	21 October 2019 - Present	Boris Johnson Liz Truss	Lord Justice of Appeal; President of the QBD; Head of Criminal Justice; Senior Presiding Judge
