= Brian Leveson =

British retired judge (born 1949)

The Right Honourable The Lord Leveson of Liverpool PC
- Official portrait, 2026

Investigatory Powers Commissioner
- Incumbent
- Assumed office 21 October 2019
- Appointed by: Boris Johnson
- Preceded by: Sir Adrian Fulford

Head of Criminal Justice
- In office 18 October 2017 – 23 June 2019
- Preceded by: Sir Ian Burnett (As Lord Chief Justice)
- Succeeded by: Dame Victoria Sharp

President of the Queen's Bench Division
- In office 1 October 2013 – 23 June 2019
- Deputy: Dame Heather Hallett
- Preceded by: Sir John Thomas
- Succeeded by: Dame Victoria Sharp

Lord Justice of Appeal
- In office 2 October 2006 – 1 October 2013

Senior Presiding Judge for England and Wales
- In office 1 January 2007 – 31 December 2009
- Deputy: Lord Justice Goldring
- Preceded by: Lord Justice Thomas
- Succeeded by: Lord Justice Goldring

5th Chancellor of Liverpool John Moores University
- In office 20 May 2013 – 1 January 2022
- Vice-Chancellor: Nigel Weatherill
- Preceded by: Brian May, CBE
- Succeeded by: Nisha Katona, MBE

Member of the House of Lords
- Lord Temporal
- Life peerage 25 August 2026

Personal details
- Born: Brian Henry Leveson; 22 June 1949 (age 77) Liverpool, England
- Party: Crossbench
- Spouse: Lynne née Fishel
- Children: 3
- Education: Merton College, Oxford
- Occupation: Judge
- Profession: Barrister

Brian Henry Leveson, Baron Leveson of Liverpool (/ˈlɛvɪsən/ LEV-iss-ən; born 22 June 1949) is an English retired senior judge who is the current Investigatory Powers Commissioner, having previously served as the President of the Queen's Bench Division and Head of Criminal Justice.

Leveson chaired the public inquiry into the culture, practices and ethics of the British press, prompted by the News of the World phone hacking affair.

== Early life ==
Leveson was born in Liverpool on 22 June 1949 to a Jewish family. He was educated at Liverpool College, a then public school in Mossley Hill, Liverpool. He studied at Merton College, Oxford and was President of the Oxford Law Society.

== Legal career ==
Leveson was called to the Bar at Middle Temple in 1970. He initially practised in Liverpool and became Queen's Counsel in 1986. Leveson became a bencher in 1995, acted as a Recorder between 1988 and 2000, and as a Deputy High Court Judge between 1998 and 2000. In 2000, Leveson was appointed as a Judge of the High Court, Queen's Bench Division, and served as a Presiding Judge of the Northern Circuit between 2002 and 2005.

In 2006, Leveson was appointed to the new position of Deputy Senior Presiding Judge and, on 2 October 2006, he was appointed a Lord Justice of Appeal. He was promoted to Senior Presiding Judge with effect from 1 January 2007.

On 1 October 2013, Leveson was appointed President of the Queen's Bench Division, succeeding Sir John Thomas.

He was Treasurer of Middle Temple in 2020.

=== Notable cases ===
==== R v West (Rosemary Pauline) ====
Leveson was the lead prosecution counsel during the trial of Rosemary West (Regina v West), who went on to be convicted for the murders of ten young women, including her own eldest daughter, in November 1995. West was sentenced to Life in Prison with a whole life order imposed.

==== Lord Justice of Appeal ====
In November 2007, the Criminal Division of the Court of Appeal, constituted by the Lord Chief Justice of England and Wales, Lord Phillips of Worth Matravers, Leveson and Mr Justice Simon, quashed the conviction of Barry George and ordered a retrial in relation to the murder in 2001 of BBC presenter Jill Dando.

He was one of three judges who heard an appeal in 2013 by several men who had admitted terrorist offences. One of them, Usman Khan, whose sentence was as a result changed from an "indeterminate sentence" to a "determinate term" of 16 years imprisonment, later committed the 2019 London Bridge stabbing.

==== Prosecution of comedian Ken Dodd for tax evasion ====
In 1989 Leveson was the lead prosecution counsel at the trial of comedian Ken Dodd. Dodd was charged with tax evasion, but was subsequently acquitted at Liverpool Crown Court, despite seemingly strong evidence.

==== Other notable cases ====
While sitting with Lord Justice Mantell In the Court of Appeal in 2002 under the Lord Chief Justice, Lord Woolf, he upheld the murder conviction of James Hanratty. He also presided over the trial of ex-US Marine Toby Studebaker for charges relating to child grooming over the internet. He sentenced 100-year-old Bernard Heginbotham, who was found guilty of manslaughter of his wife of 67 years, 87-year-old Ida, to a 12-month rehabilitation order. He also presided over the trial of two men who were found guilty in 2005 of murdering Anthony Walker with an axe. He was one of the judges in the appeal of Ruth Ellis in 2003 who said that the appeal was without merit.

==== Press ethics inquiry and News International phone hacking scandal ====
It was announced on 13 July 2011 that Leveson would lead the public inquiry into issues of British press culture, practices and ethics raised by the News International phone hacking scandal. On 20 July, Prime Minister David Cameron announced that the scope of the inquiry had widened to include the BBC and social media.

The hearings began on Monday 14 November 2011. The full report was published on 29 November 2012 and is available online.

== Later career ==
In 2013 Leveson was appointed as Chancellor of Liverpool John Moores University, taking over from Brian May, who stepped down at the end of his term.

In 2019, Leveson was appointed as the Investigatory Powers Commissioner, re-appointed for a further three-year term in October 2022, and again for a further three-year term in October 2025.

In December 2024, Leveson was appointed by the Lord Chancellor to carry out an independent review of the criminal courts. Part 1 of the report, covering reform of the courts, was published in July 2025, and part 2, covering efficiency, was published in February 2026.

== Personal life ==
Leveson has a wife, Lynne (daughter of Aubrey Fishel, also from Liverpool). The couple have three children.

== Honours ==
In 1986, Leveson took silk and was appointed Queen's Counsel granting him the Suffix of 'QC', upon appointment as a Judge the suffix was no longer used.

Leveson was appointed a Knight Bachelor in 2001, by Queen Elizabeth II granting him the title of 'Sir'. In 2006 Leveson was sworn as a Privy Counsellor which grants him the Style 'The Right Honourable' for life.

The Prime Minister's Office announced on 16 July 2026 that Leveson was to be made a crossbench peer. He was created as Baron Leveson of Liverpool, of Liverpool in the County of Merseyside on 25 August 2026.
