= Listed buildings in Ulnes Walton =

Ulnes Walton is a civil parish in the Borough of Chorley, Lancashire, England. It contains five buildings that are recorded in the National Heritage List for England as designated listed buildings, all of which are listed at Grade II. This grade is the lowest of the three gradings given to listed buildings and is applied to "buildings of national importance and special interest". The parish is almost entirely rural, and the listed buildings consist of farmhouses and farm buildings, and a boundary stone.

== Buildings ==
Name and location	Photograph	Date	Notes
Barn, Littlewood Hall Farm; 53.67206°N 2.76437°W	—	Late 16th or early 17th century	The barn was originally timber-framed, this being later replaced by brick. There is a sandstone plinth and a slate roof. The barn has five bays, opposing wagon entrances, and exposed roof timbers in the north gable. Inside there are timber-framed partitions.
Gradwell's Farmhouse; 53.66554°N 2.75157°W	—	17th century	The former farmhouse was altered in 1878. It is in brick with stone quoins and a stone-slate roof. There are two storeys and three bays, with a rear outshut. On the front is a two-storey gabled porch and 19th-century sash windows. In the left gable end is another porch, this being in Gothic style.
Roecroft Farmhouse; 53.66419°N 2.74287°W	—	Early 18th century	The farmhouse was extended in the 19th century. It is in brick on a sandstone plinth, with stone quoins and a stone-slate roof. The house has two storeys with an attic and a cellar, and a symmetrical two-bay front, with a single-storey extension on the left. The windows contain altered glazing, and there is a central half-dormer. Inside are timber-framed partitions, and an upper cruck roof truss.
Norris Farmhouse and barn 53.67924°N 2.73792°W	—	1757	The farmhouse and attached barn are in brick with stone-slate roofs. The house has two storeys with an attic, and a two-bay front. The doorway is towards the left, and has a large lintel with a datestone above. The windows are casements. The barn has wagon entrances, doorways, windows, and ventilation holes in diamond patterns.
Boundary stone 53.66422°N 2.75198°W	—	Early to mid 19th century	The stone marks the boundary between the parishes of Croston and Ulnes Walton. It is in sandstone, and measures 0.7 metres (2 ft 4 in) high by 0.6 metres (2 ft 0 in) wide and is 0.25 metres (9.8 in) thick. It has two chamfered faces, each inscribed with the names of the parishes, and on the rounded upper part is the word "BOUNDARY" and an Ordnance Survey bench mark.
