= John Kay (judge) =

British judge

The Right Honourable Sir John Kay
- Royal coat of arms of the United Kingdom

Lord Justice of Appeal
- In office 2000–2004
- Monarch: Elizabeth II

Justice of the High Court
- In office 1992–2000

Personal details
- Born: 13 September 1943 Sidcup, Middlesex, England
- Died: 2 July 2004 (aged 60) South Bank, London, England
- Resting place: Sefton Parish Churchyard, Sefton, Merseyside
- Spouse: Jennifer Ann Kay
- Children: 3 (including Ben Kay and Amanda Yip)
- Education: Christ's College, Cambridge

Sir John William Kay PC (13 September 1943 – 2 July 2004) was a British judge who served as Lord Justice of Appeal, being a member of the Court of Appeal of England and Wales from 2000 until his death.

== Career ==
After being called to the bar in 1968 following a brief stint as a schoolteacher, he became a Queen's Counsel in 1984 and was named to the High Court of Justice of England and Wales in 1992.

On the Court of Appeal he upheld the conviction of mass murderer Jeremy Bamber in 2002, perhaps his most celebrated case. He subsequently overturned the murder conviction of Sally Clark, accused of killing her two young sons, and dismissed the posthumous appeal in the name of the executed Ruth Ellis on largely technical grounds.

== Personal life ==
Growing up near Liverpool, he was educated at Denstone College and subsequently studied mathematics at Christ's College, Cambridge before switching to law. A keen rugby enthusiast he played for Waterloo Rugby Club in his youth and later became club president between 1995 and 1997. He married Jennifer Kay in 1966, when he had two daughters and a son. Ben, who was part of the victorious 2003 Rugby World Cup squad. His daughter Amanda was appointed to the High Court in 2017.

Kay died on 2 July 2004 in London, following a heart attack. He was cremated and buried at Sefton Parish Churchyard in Sefton, Merseyside.
