= Lord Greene =

Lord Greene may refer to:

- Wilfrid Greene, 1st Baron Greene (1883–1952), British judge
- Sidney Greene, Baron Greene of Harrow Weald (1910–2004), British trade union leader

== See also ==
- Lord Green (disambiguation)
