= Ben Kay =

English and British & Irish Lions rugby union footballer

Ben Kay MBE
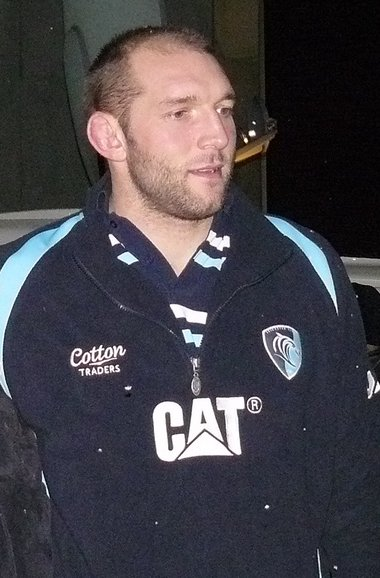
- Born: Benedict James Kay; 14 December 1975 (age 50) Liverpool, England
- Height: 6 ft 6 in (1.98 m)
- Weight: 120 kg (265 lb; 18 st 13 lb)
- School: Merchant Taylors' Boys' School, Crosby
- University: Loughborough University
- Notable relative(s): Sir John Kay (father); Dame Amanda Yip (sister)

Rugby union career
- Position: Second Row
Amateur team(s)
Years	Team	Apps	(Points)
- Loughborough Students RUFC
Senior career
Years	Team	Apps	(Points)
1999–2010	Leicester Tigers	281	(55)
- Correct as of 9 June 2010
International career
Years	Team	Apps	(Points)
2001–2009	England	62	(10)
2005	British & Irish Lions	2	(0)
- Correct as of 14 June 2009

Benedict James Kay MBE (born 14 December 1975) is an English retired international rugby union footballer who played second row forward for Leicester Tigers, England and the British & Irish Lions.

== Background ==
Kay was born in Liverpool, the only son of Lord Justice of Appeal Sir John William Kay (1943–2004), His sister, Dame Amanda Yip, is also a judge. His father's vocation later earned Ben the nickname "M'lud". Kay first started playing rugby for Waterloo minis going on to play for the Waterloo first team.

Kay played for his school (Merchant Taylors' Boys' School, Crosby) and has also played for Queensland University. He represented England in the 1996 Students World Cup in South Africa and at U18, U19 and U21 level. He attended Loughborough University, where he obtained a degree in Sports Science.

== Career ==
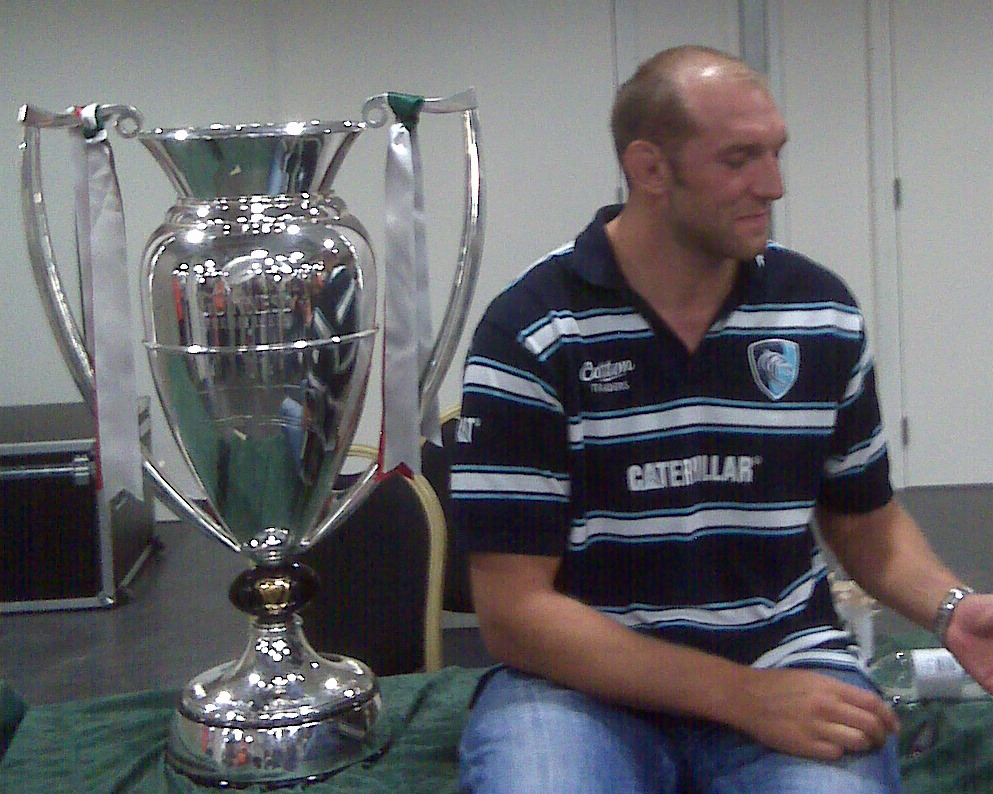
Ben Kay with the Guinness Premiership trophy

Kay joined Leicester Tigers from Waterloo in 1999 and first played during the World Cup, with Tigers' normal Second rows Martin Johnson and Fritz van Heerden away with England and South Africa respectively. With the help of Johnson and van Heerden, he developed his game, becoming a highly rated middle line-out jumper, like van Heerden. He was a member of Tigers' Heineken Cup winning sides in 2001 and 2002 as his international career blossomed.

Having made his England A debut against France A in Blagnac in 2000 Kay led England A to a 23–22 win over France A at Redruth in April 2001, and was called up for England's successful tour of North America and Japan that summer. He made his England debut against Canada on 2 June 2001 displacing Danny Grewcock from the England side.

After another outstanding season he was named as the Tigers Members' Player of the Year 2001/2, and was a nominee for the Zurich Premiership Player of the Year. He was in the starting line-up for all the Six Nations games in 2002, and scored a try against Ireland. After touring with England to Argentina in the summer of 2002, where he scored his second try, Kay went on to compete in both the Autumn internationals and the Six Nations, before touring to New Zealand and Australia in June 2003.

Kay confirmed his status as a core part of the England squad in the World Cup when he played every minute of every England game except the game against Uruguay. His line-out skills came to the fore here, particularly during the games against South Africa, when Kay learned to count in Afrikaans to crack the Springboks' line-out codes. During the final against Australia, Kay famously knocked-on (dropped the ball forwards) in a try-scoring position when a try would have almost certainly meant an England win. England won regardless, partly as a result of Tigers' teammate Lewis Moody winning a line-out Kay himself had called.

Sir Clive Woodward selected him for the 2005 British & Irish Lions tour to New Zealand. Kay came off the bench against Argentina in an official Test prior to the tour. Kay started in the first Test of the series.

He was the only player to play every minute of England's 2007 Rugby World Cup campaign culminating in their narrow loss in the Final. He was one of only four players to have started both the 2003 and 2007 RWC Finals, the other three being Jonny Wilkinson, Jason Robinson and Phil Vickery.

Kay helped Leicester win the Premiership in 2007, starting the final as they defeated Gloucester. He was a used replacement in every game of the 2008 Six Nations.

Kay started both the 2008–09 Heineken Cup final and the Guinness Premiership win the same season. The Tigers won back-to-back Premiership titles the following season, in the 2009–10 Guinness Premiership, by beating Saracens 33–27 at Twickenham, though Kay did not feature in that game. He decided to retire at the end of the 2009–10 season after 11 years with Leicester Tigers. He has since worked as a commentator for ESPN and BT Sport.

He also served as non-executive director on Leicester Tigers' board of directors between 2014 and 2021.

== Personal life ==
Kay is a supporter of Liverpool FC.

In 2002, Kay married long-time girlfriend Virginia, a physiotherapist, and they have four children, Jemima, Walter, Digby and Pippa. His long time Leicester Tigers and England teammate Martin Johnson was an usher at his wedding.

Kay paid his respects to his former sports teacher at Merchant Taylors, Ian 'Robbo' Robinson, who died in a white water rafting incident whilst on a rugby tour with the school.
