= Adrian Fulford =

British judge (born 1953)

The Right Honourable Sir Adrian Fulford
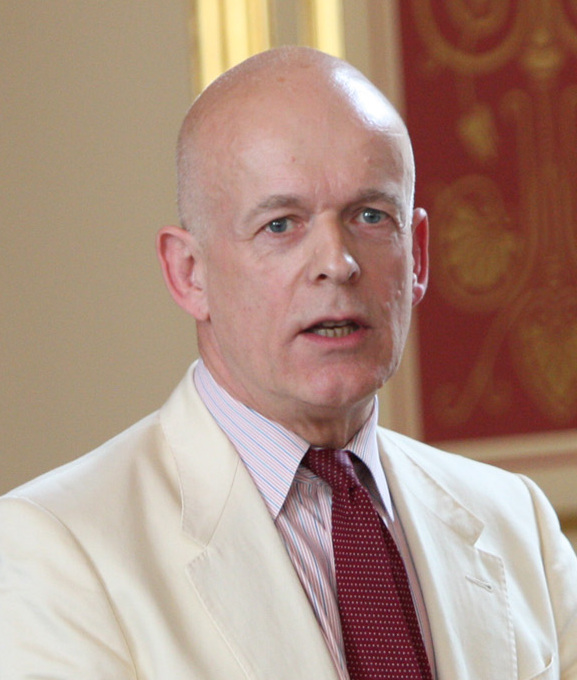

Investigatory Powers Commissioner
- In office 3 March 2017 – October 2019
- Nominated by: The Lord Thomas of Cwmgiedd as Lord Chief Justice
- Appointed by: Theresa May as Prime Minister

Lord Justice of Appeal
- In office 10 May 2013 – 1 October 2022
- Nominated by: David Cameron as Prime Minister
- Appointed by: Elizabeth II

Judge of the International Criminal Court
- In office 11 March 2003 – 31 August 2012
- Nominated by: The Lord Irvine of Lairg as Lord Chancellor
- Appointed by: Assembly of States Parties

High Court judge Queen's Bench Division
- In office 2002–2013
- Appointed by: Elizabeth II

Personal details
- Born: Adrian Bruce Fulford; 8 January 1953 (age 73)
- Education: University of Southampton

Sir Adrian Bruce Fulford PC (born 8 January 1953) is a retired Lord Justice of Appeal. From 2017 to 2019, he was the first Investigatory Powers Commissioner, and was the Vice-President of the Court of Appeal (Criminal Division) in 2019, succeeding Lady Justice Hallett.

Previously, he was a judge of the International Criminal Court in The Hague from 2003–12, the Senior Presiding Judge for England and Wales from January 2016 to March 2017, and former member of the National Council for Civil Liberties (NCCL).

== Early life ==
Fulford was born on 8 January 1953. He was educated at Elizabeth College, Guernsey and went up to the University of Southampton, gaining a LLB. From 1974 to 1975, he served as a housing advisor at Shelter's Housing Aid Service.

== Legal career ==
He was called to the bar at the Middle Temple as a barrister in 1978, and appointed Queen's Counsel in 1994.

One of Fulford’s earliest, and most prominent, cases was serving as counsel to Ronnie Bolden, on trial at the Old Bailey in 1989 charged with armed robbery by the West Midlands Serious Crime Squad (SCS), which was later disbanded.

== Judicial career ==
In 1995, Fulford was made a Recorder of the Crown Court (re-appointed in 2001). His appointment as a High Court judge on 21 November 2002 was only the second such appointment of an openly homosexual QC, and the first to the King's Bench Division (then called the Queen's Bench Division)..

=== High Court ===
Fulford was appointed to what was then the Queen's Bench Division and received the customary knighthood. Though he became a judge of the International Criminal Court in 2003, Fulford continued his work at the High Court, presiding over a number of high-profile cases. Among these were the 21 July 2005 London bombings trial, an extremist Muslim plot to cause deadly explosions similar to those which killed over 50 people on 7 July; the trial of terrorist plotter Saajid Badat; and the trial of PC Simon Harwood for the death of a street newspaper seller Ian Tomlinson in the City of London. Fulford's term on the ICC ended on 11 March 2012.

On 11 May 2012, Fulford imposed a whole life order on David Oakes, who was convicted at the Crown Court at Chelmsford of the premeditated and sadistic murder of his former partner and daughter. Fulford also presided over the trial of Jiervon Barlett and Najed Hoque who were accused of the manslaughter of Paula Castle, a woman mugged in Greenford, West London. He sentenced them to 13 years.

Fulford received the UK Government's nomination, and was subsequently elected in 2003 to serve, as one of 18 judges of the International Criminal Court for a term of nine years, and was assigned to the Trial Division. He was sworn into office on 11 March 2003. Fulford presided over the ICC's first trial, that of Thomas Lubanga, and in that capacity delivered the court's first guilty verdict on 14 March 2012.

=== Court of Appeal ===
On 10 May 2013, Fulford was appointed a Lord Justice of Appeal.

Fulford was appointed as the Deputy Senior Presiding Judge on 1 January 2015, and was promoted to Senior Presiding Judge on 1 January 2016 succeeding Peter Gross. On 31 March 2017, Fulford stood down from this position, to accept appointment as the first Investigatory Powers Commissioner in which role he will be supported by fifteen senior judges appointed under the Investigatory Powers Act 2016.

In 2021, he presided over the sentencing of Metropolitan Police officer Wayne Couzens, who pleaded guilty to the murder of Sarah Everard. Sentencing him at the Old Bailey to a whole-life tariff, Fulford described the case as "devastating, tragic and wholly brutal" and told Couzens he had eroded public confidence in the police.

On 1 October 2022, Fulford retired as a Lord Justice of Appeal.

=== Judge Coroner ===
Fulford was appointed Judge Coroner to conduct the inquests into the victims of the terror attack at Forbury Gardens in Reading on 20 June 2002. The inquests were concluded in April 2024, and found that the murders were avoidable; the perpetrator had extensive contact with mental health services and police, but intelligence sharing between authorities (including counter-terrorist police officers, other police forces, the probation service, and Berkshire Healthcare NHS Foundation Trust) led to "significantly troubling failings" in highlighting him as a high risk. Fulford concluded that if his mental health had been correctly managed, there was a possibility that the attacks would not have happened.

=== Southport Inquiry ===
Fulford was chosen by the Home Secretary to head the Southport Inquiry, which investigates the 2024 Southport stabbings.

== Allegations ==
In March 2014, The Mail on Sunday published allegations that Sir Adrian Fulford had supported the Paedophile Information Exchange (PIE) in the 1970s, citing his involvement with the National Council for Civil Liberties (NCCL), an organisation that PIE was affiliated with at the time. The article alleged that Fulford, as a former NCCL executive member, had links to the group. Fulford categorically denied the allegations, stating that he had "never had any involvement in, or sympathy for, the Paedophile Information Exchange or any of its objectives."

Following the publication, Fulford voluntarily stepped down from hearing criminal cases while an investigation by the Judicial Conduct Investigations Office (JCIO) took place. The inquiry, led by Lord Kerr of Tonaghmore, concluded on 18 June 2014 that the allegations were "without substance" and confirmed that Fulford "was not and had never been a supporter of PIE or its aims." He subsequently resumed his judicial duties.

== Honours ==
- He was appointed as a Queen's Counsel (QC) in 1994.
- He was Knighted as a Knight Bachelor on 16 December 2002. The award was Gazetted on 11 March 2003.
- He was sworn in as a member of Her Majesty's Most Honourable Privy Council in 2013. This allows him the Honorific Title "The Right Honourable" for Life.
- He was awarded the Honorary Degree of Doctor of Laws (LLD) by the University of Southampton in 2011.

== See also ==
- Murder of Sarah Everard
