= Midge Hall =

Village in Lancashire, England

Coordinates: 53.703°N 2.735°W

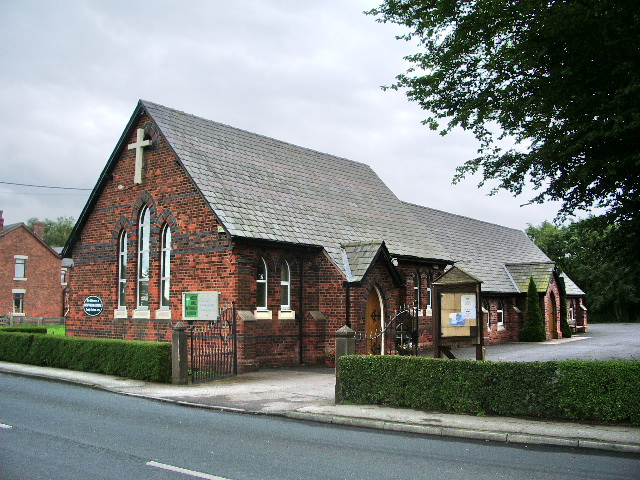
- Midge Hall Methodist Church

- Shown within South Ribble Location within Lancashire
- OS grid reference: SD514232
- District: South Ribble
- Shire county: Lancashire
- Region: North West
- Country: England
- Sovereign state: United Kingdom
- Post town: LEYLAND
- Postcode district: PR26
- Dialling code: 01772
- Police: Lancashire
- Fire: Lancashire
- Ambulance: North West
- UK Parliament: South Ribble

Midge Hall is a small village on the outskirts of Leyland in the borough of South Ribble, Lancashire, England.

Notable features include the Midge Hall pub (formerly The Railway, and adjacent to the level crossing), a mill which produces animal feed and a test track for cars and wagons from the Leyland Trucks factory.

There is a disused railway station which is on the Ormskirk Branch Line.

== Geography ==
Midge Hall lies to the south of New Longton and Whitestake and to the north of Leyland and to the east of Much Hoole, with parts of Leyland on its west also. It has a Methodist church, a small pub and a shop that sells bird seed.
