= Joseph McCann (criminal) =

English serial rapist (born 1985)

- Born: 8 February 1985 (age 41); London, England
- Status: Incarcerated at HM Prison Wymott
- Conviction: 37 charges: False imprisonment (10 counts); Kidnapping (7 counts); Rape (7 counts); Assault by penetration (3 counts); Causing or inciting a child under 13 to engage in sexual activity (3 counts); Causing or inciting a person to engage in sexual activity without consent (2 counts); Committing an offence with intent to commit a sexual offence (2 counts); Rape of a child; Attempted kidnapping; Sexual assault
- Penalty: 33 consecutive life sentences, eligible for parole after 40 years (previously 30 years)

Joseph McCann (born 8 February 1985) is an English serial rapist. In April and May 2019, McCann committed sexual attacks in Hertfordshire, London, Greater Manchester and Cheshire against 11 strangers, ranging in age from an 11-year-old boy to a 71-year-old woman. He evaded police, who suspect that he was sheltered by a "support network" across the country. For these crimes, he was tried at the Old Bailey and in December, he was convicted of 37 offences and given 33 life sentences. McCann had previously been noted as a habitual offender, having been one of the first recipients of an anti-social behaviour order at age 14.

== Early life ==
Joseph McCann was born on 8 February 1985 in North London, to a Scottish builder and a mother with "links" to the Irish traveller community; he was reported as being "one generation removed" from travellers and part of a "large travelling family". By the mid-1990s, the McCanns had moved to a council house on Tyrol Walk in Beswick, a district of Manchester.

== Criminal history before April 2019 ==
Beginning around 1996, McCann and his brothers "ran a campaign of intimidation and crime" in their neighbourhood. McCann first came into contact with the police at the age of 11. His first conviction was for theft, when he was aged 13, and others followed for criminal damage, possession of a knife and handling stolen goods. Other incidents reported by the press included stealing and setting fire to vehicles, carrying out muggings, threatening elderly neighbours and intimidating young children attending a homework club. Following complaints from neighbours, the council filmed the brothers vandalising property, damaging cars and throwing bricks at people. With neighbours and the council gathering evidence against the boys, in 1998 the council evicted the family from their home.

=== 1999 anti-social behaviour order ===
The McCanns moved to Ardwick, also in Manchester, but the boys often returned to their old estate and continued what the Manchester Evening Post called a "campaign of terror". A local police officer told The Guardian that "there was a perception that they [the McCanns] were untouchable. The three boys caused an enormous amount of problems for local people and committed a range of anti-social behaviour". The police continued to gather evidence from neighbours and, in 1999, McCann and his brothers were subject to one of the United Kingdom's first anti-social behaviour orders (ASBO). They were banned from "entering the Beswick area [,] ... using or engaging in any abusive, insulting, offensive, threatening or intimidating language or behaviour in the City of Manchester [,] ... threatening or engaging in violence or damage against people or property in the City ... and encouraging others [to do the same]". The boys were photographed smirking and swearing at journalists after leaving court. Residents of Beswick were said to have been "relieved" by the order; the police reported that crime fell by a third, the burglary rate halved and one supermarket claimed that its revenue rose by £14,000 a week after the ASBO had been imposed.

The brothers appealed against the order, firstly to the Crown Court and then to the High Court. Both failed and they took it to the Court of Appeal in 2001, which also rejected the appeal. In 2002, the House of Lords heard the case, which rested on whether an ASBO constituted civil or criminal proceedings under article 6 of the European Convention on Human Rights. This distinction mattered because hearsay was inadmissible in criminal proceedings; ASBOs had been established to be civil injunctions with criminal penalties, which (as civil proceedings) allowed the hearsay of intimidated people to be admissible rather than demand that they appear as witnesses. If the House of Lords had ruled them to be criminal proceedings, then the ASBO would be "unworkable". In R (McCann & others) v Crown Court at Manchester and another ([2002] UKHL 39), it was ruled that the proceedings were civil and the McCanns' case was therefore dismissed. Because of its wider implications, the ruling was discussed in academic literature.

=== 2008 indefinite sentence ===
After the 1999 ASBO, the McCann family moved away from Manchester. As The Daily Telegraph remarked, the ASBO came as a relief to residents of Beswick but "failed to solve the problem" of the McCanns' offending. The family settled in the south of England, in Aylesbury and Harrow, where the brothers continued to commit crimes, including car theft and damage to property. By 2007, McCann was living in Bedford. He had fathered a young child was not present at the birth because he was in prison. On 27 December, he burgled the house of an elderly man in Cotton End; McCann threatened to stab the man and stole a purse. After McCann was recognised on CCTV, he was arrested, eventually pleaded guilty to aggravated burglary and was sentenced in September 2008 to an imprisonment for public protection (IPP) order with a minimum term of two years and six months in prison. His partner was heavily pregnant with their second child at the time of his sentencing. McCann's IPP was a form of indefinite sentence which meant that his release would only occur after the minimum term and once the Parole Board for England and Wales became satisfied that he would no longer pose a risk to the public; if he were released, it would be on a ten-year licence and if he were convicted of further offences during that period, he would be recalled to prison on his IPP sentence.

While serving his sentence, McCann was assessed by his offender manager as "posing a high risk of serious harm to the public and known adults", as well as a "medium risk" to children, prison staff and prisoners. In 2009, prison staff intercepted letters suggesting that he "posed a risk of sexual harm". Two years later, police alerted his offender managers to intelligence from 2003 indicating that he "might pose a risk of sexual harm and exploitation to teenage girls". McCann remained in prison for over eight years; the Parole Board rejected his applications for parole in 2010, 2012 and 2014. He carried out rehabilitation courses and risk-reduction courses and was finally released on licence in March 2017. While McCann served his sentence, his brother Sean killed himself while serving a two-year sentence for assault and other offences at HMP Peterborough.

=== 2017 release and re-sentencing ===
On his release from prison, McCann was assigned to spend twelve weeks at an Approved Premises in East Anglia. At the end of that period, he went to live with family in Buckinghamshire which was approved as a temporary arrangement. However, in late July and early August 2017 he visited Manchester and began moving between other family addresses in Hertfordshire; as a result of this, his offender manager was unable to make contact with him.

On 18 August 2017, he was arrested for car theft and burglary and was subsequently remanded in custody. In January 2018, he was sentenced to three years and four months in prison for burglary and motor vehicle theft. In sentencing him, the judge remarked that this would run concurrently with his IPP sentence, but his offender management team did not recall him on that sentence; had they done so, he would have had to appear before a parole board before being considered for release. Instead, his sentence was treated as a determinate one which meant that he would be released halfway through on licence.

=== 2019 release on licence ===
In late 2018 and early January 2019, staff at McCann's prison contacted the probation service, who were concerned that McCann had not been recalled on his IPP sentence. The senior probation officer reiterated that his predecessor, who had been responsible for the case at the time of McCann's sentencing, had made the decision not to recall him. The Assistant Chief Officer who headed the probation service in Hertfordshire affirmed the decision in January 2019, out of concern that there was a risk McCann could challenge his recall at that late stage. Soon after, he was released on licence and prohibited from pursuing relationships with women. His offender manager was unable to find him a room at Approved Premises, so he was permitted to return to his family address in Buckinghamshire. At the time of his subsequent offences in April, he was living in Aylesbury.

In early April 2019, McCann applied to his local authority to obtain housing for him and a new female partner. When told that they could not house him, he became rude towards staff, who contacted his offender manager. Because his new relationship put him in breach of licence, he was issued with a warning letter on 10 April by probation services. This was further discussed with him by his offender manager eight days later. On 12 April, his brother Michael was sentenced to six years and 11 months in prison for carrying out a string of handbag thefts, credit card frauds and driving offences in Hertfordshire during 2018.

== Sexual offences and manhunt, April–May 2019 ==
On 21 April 2019, McCann abducted and raped a 21-year-old woman in Watford, Hertfordshire. The abduction took place at 3:30 am, when she was walking home from a night out; McCann forced her into his car at knife-point. He then took her to a house, raped her and released her that morning. Hertfordshire Police identified McCann that day and added him to the national police computer. Police, however, were unable to trace him and, just after midnight on 25 April, he abducted a 25-year-old woman in Walthamstow in north-east London, dragging her into his car; he raped and sexually assaulted her over a 14-hour period. She was still in his car when he abducted another woman (aged 21) in Edgware in north London. He attacked her as well. McCann drove to Watford with them in his car; there, he attempted to book into a hotel before one of the women hit him with a glass bottle, allowing them both to escape. The Metropolitan Police did not link these later two attacks with the earlier one until 28 April. A manhunt followed as police released his name and offered a £20,000 reward for information but he managed to evade police, who suspect that he was sheltered by a "support network" across the country.

On 5 May, he met a woman at a bar in Greater Manchester and convinced her to allow him into her home; there, he tied her up and raped her 17-year-old daughter and 11-year-old son at around 8:00 am. The daughter managed to flee the house, jumping from an upstairs window, and alerted neighbours. As McCann fled, the son untied his mother. At 1:30 pm, McCann abducted a 71-year-old woman outside a supermarket and subsequently raped her; while still holding her, he abducted and sexually assaulted a 13-year-old girl. They escaped at Knutsford Services that evening. McCann then drove to Congleton in Cheshire, where, on the same day at 6:30 pm, he abducted two 14-year-old girls and threatened to kill them. He was spotted by police, who gave chase; in the pursuit, McCann crashed his car and fled on foot, leaving the girls unharmed. He caught a taxi, but the police noticed him at a road block near Congleton. He fled from the vehicle on foot; police caught up with him and he was discovered hiding up a tree down a country lane at around 3:00 am on 6 May. He was then arrested and detained.

== Trial and imprisonment ==
For these crimes, he was tried at the Old Bailey and, on 6 December, convicted of 37 offences. Three days later, he was given 33 life sentences, and ordered to serve a minimum of 30 years before he can be considered for parole. On 11 December 2020, this minimum was raised to 40 years by the Court of Appeal.

== Aftermath and commentary ==
=== Probation services ===
After McCann's trial, BBC News stated that the National Probation Service (NPS) had "not followed the correct procedures" when he was sentenced in 2017; he should have been recalled on his IPP sentence. The report stated that "the failure to do so was hugely significant" because McCann would not have been able to apply for release until the summer of 2019 and would likely have been turned down. The Ministry of Justice carried out a Serious Further Offence Review, a summary of which was released to the public in March 2020. The report concluded that the NPS "did not manage [McCann] effectively or in line with the policies and procedures which set out the expectations for managing offenders who pose a high risk of harm. The standard of practice did vary significantly over time and between individuals". It found that the early management of McCann's case during his IPP sentence was positive, but this was "critically undermined" by later "repeated and various failures". This included the failure to consider historical intelligence about his risk of sexual harm; poor sentence planning; and the repeated decision not to recall McCann to prison on his IPP sentence after August 2017.

The SFO report revealed that McCann's case had been managed by 10 offender managers between September 2008 and his release in February 2019. In 2018, staff turnover was high, caseloads rose and the office relied on temporary workers who were inexperienced with high-risk offenders. The quick handovers between managers meant that "pertinent risk concerns were lost"; it added that "It appears that the pressure on the staff throughout 2018 and the chaotic transfer of the case between numerous offender managers also significantly impacted their ability to comprehensively review [McCann]’s historical record, and therefore to identify the previous references to sexual violence". In December 2019, The Guardian had suggested that austerity policies and budget cuts had reduced the NPS's capacity to deal with McCann's case and "that this failure may be evidence of the impact of austerity on the criminal justice system". The newspaper also pointed out that the NPS had been partly privatised in 2014 and its management restructured; afterwards, inspectors found that probation officers' workload were often significantly over capacity and that this was highest in the regional division which managed McCann (which also experienced staff shortages). McCann's sentencing and these concerns arose several days after the 2019 London Bridge attack, which also prompted political debate about the nature of prison sentences for serious offending in the lead up to the United Kingdom's general election that was held on 12 December.

== See also ==
- List of serial rapists
