= Murder of Olivia Pratt-Korbel =

Fatal shooting of a girl in Liverpool, England

- Family photograph of Olivia Pratt-Korbel
- Location: Dovecot, Liverpool, England
- Date: 22 August 2022 c. 10 pm BST (UTC+01)
- Deaths: 1
- Injuries: 2
- Charges: Murder; Possession of an illegal firearm; Attempted murder; Grievous bodily harm; Assisting an offender (Paul Russell)
- Convicted: Thomas Cashman
- Judge: Mrs Justice Yip

On 22 August 2022, Olivia Pratt-Korbel, a nine-year-old girl, was shot by Thomas Cashman in Liverpool, England, and was pronounced dead the same day at the city's Alder Hey Children's Hospital. The attack took place at the doorstep of the Korbels' family home in Dovecot; the intended target of the attack was Joseph Nee, a 35-year-old gang member who had criminal convictions for drug dealing and burglary. During the attack, Olivia Pratt-Korbel was with her mother. A shot by Cashman passed through her mother's hand and into Olivia Pratt-Korbel's chest. In April 2023 at Manchester Crown Court (Crown Square), Cashman was sentenced to life imprisonment with a minimum term of 42 years.

== Background ==
Olivia Pratt-Korbel was born on 13 June 2013. Her mother, Cheryl Korbel, was aged 46 at the time of the shooting. Olivia had an older brother and sister and lived in Liverpool, North West England.

Thomas Edward Cashman is an English father-of-two born on 4 September 1988 in Liverpool. Prior to being jailed he was living in West Derby, Liverpool. Cashman grew up in Liverpool with four siblings. He left school at the age of 13 before going to work at a fairground in Wales. He then returned to Liverpool to become a drug dealer and sold cannabis at a small-scale. His cannabis dealing scale increased as time went on and at the time of his arrest he was earning between £3,000 and £5,000 a week by selling large quantities. He had 18 previous convictions for 33 offences.

== Killing ==
Around 10 pm on 22 August 2022, Olivia's mother Cheryl Korbel heard a disturbance outside her family home in Kingsheath Avenue, Dovecot, and opened her front door, with Pratt-Korbel behind her. Joseph Nee, a 35-year-old "well-established organised crime group member" and one of two men fleeing from Thomas Cashman, attempted to force himself into her home. While Nee attempted to enter the house, Cashman, who was wearing a balaclava and a black jacket, approached the house and shot four times. One of the bullets went through Cheryl's hand and into Olivia's chest, fatally wounding her.

The inquest heard that a police officer attempted to save Olivia's life after the shooting.

Nee, the intended target of the attack, was a convicted drug dealer and burglar. He had been released on licence in 2021, halfway through his sentence. Pratt-Korbel's siblings were in the house upstairs during the attack. Olivia Pratt-Korbel was later declared deceased at Alder Hey Children's Hospital, Liverpool. Merseyside Police understood that Nee walked away from Pratt-Korbel and her mother to get in an escape vehicle, a black Audi car.

== Investigation ==
The next day, 23 August, Nee was arrested for breaching his licence conditions and would be returned to prison once medical staff had determined his condition stable enough to be dischargeable.

During the late night of 25 August 2022, a 36-year-old man was arrested at his flat in Huyton on suspicion of the murder of Pratt-Korbel and two counts of attempted murder.

On 30 August 2022, both men were released on bail, Nee returning to prison due to breaching his licence conditions. On 1 September, Merseyside Police released CCTV footage of the gunman. On 4 September 2022 one man was arrested on suspicion of murder and attempted murder, and two others detained on suspicion of assisting an offender. On 7 September the suspects were bailed. On 8 September another man was arrested. A ninth man was arrested on 10 September 2022.

On 29 September, police arrested 34-year-old Thomas Cashman on suspicion of murder. On 30 September, a man was arrested on suspicion of assisting an offender. On 1 October, Cashman was charged with the murder, two counts of attempted murder as well as two counts of possession of a firearm with intent to endanger life. 40-year-old Paul Russell was also charged with assisting an offender. The two men appeared at Liverpool Crown Court on 3 October. On 21 December 2022, Cashman appeared at Liverpool Crown Court via videolink from HM Prison Manchester and pleaded not guilty to all five charges.

Cashman had been apprehended after a tip-off from a former partner, who lived nearby and he had visited shortly after the murder. She recounted that he arrived in a panicked state and was asking for a change of clothes. When she originally came forward to the police after hearing about the child murder on the news she was arrested on suspicion of assisting an offender, before police realised she held crucial information and was willingly cooperating. There was independent evidence to corroborate her account, as the clothes she said she gave to Cashman were then recovered hidden inside a pram box in Cashman's sister's home with his DNA on them, and gunshot residue was found on the leg of the tracksuit bottoms. The woman also recounted overhearing Cashman saying something along the lines of "I've done Joey" to Paul Russell, her partner. Russell would later plead guilty to assisting offender Cashman by driving him away from the address and disposing of a bag given to him by Cashman, which he believed contained clothes.

Other evidence against Cashman was the existence of CCTV which showed him circling the area where the attack on Nee would later take place, showing him driving around in his van on multiple occasions and walking around the area on foot. It was believed that Cashman was carrying out reconnaissance of the area to look for Nee and determine whether he had parked his car by an address on that road (which he had). CCTV had shown Cashman had driven his van to the area from his own address at around 3pm, and also that he had repeatedly returned to Mab Lane, where the home of the key female witness who would later testify Cashman rushed to after the killing was located. CCTV of the gunman that night also showed him wearing a pair of tracksuit bottoms that matched the style of and design of those worn by Cashman. When police searched Cashman's home they also found hidden cables from missing CCTV recorders, and also discovered that one of these had last been connected on 25 August, days after the shooting. However, the CCTV recorders themselves were missing.

Cashman acknowledged he had been in the area that day as a 'drug-dealer', but denied that he was the gunman. The attacker had fired two guns that night against Nee, and Cashman was found to have two guns at his address, a 9 mm calibre self-loading pistol and a 0.3" calibre revolver. One of these guns was found by police to have been linked to two previous shootings in the area, one of which involved a previous attempt to kill Nee only two weeks prior to Pratt-Korbel's murder, for which Cashman was already considered a suspect.

== Trial, conviction and sentencing ==
The trial began at Manchester Crown Court on 7 March 2023, before Mrs Justice Amanda Yip. On 30 March 2023, Thomas Cashman was found guilty of the murder of Olivia along with the wounding of Olivia's mother, the attempted murder of his intended target and two counts of possession of a firearm with intent to endanger life. The guns used were a 9 mm calibre self-loading pistol and a 0.3" calibre revolver. Paul Russell had pleaded guilty to assisting an offender in October 2022, but the media were unable to report on it until the conclusion of Cashman's trial. Russell had assisted Cashman by driving him away from an address and disposing of a bag given to him by Cashman, which Russell believed to contain items of clothing.

On 3 April 2023, Thomas Cashman was sentenced to life imprisonment for Olivia's murder, as well as for the attempted murder of his intended target; he was ordered to serve a minimum of 42 years before being considered for parole. He was sentenced to 10 years for the wounding of Olivia's mother, and received two 18 year sentences for both counts of possession of a firearm with intent to endanger life, with all of the sentences to run concurrently. Cashman was not in court to hear his sentence. On 26 April 2023, Paul Russell was sentenced to 22 months' imprisonment.

Cashman was 34 years old at the time of his sentencing. He will become eligible to be considered for parole on 22 March 2064, at which time he will be in his mid-70s.

In late April 2023, it was reported that Cashman was to appeal to have his sentence reduced. In July 2023, he was refused permission to appeal his sentence.

== Reactions ==
Prime Minister Boris Johnson described the killing as a "horrific, senseless shooting". Johnson added: "This is an unimaginable tragedy and we will ensure Merseyside Police get whatever they need to catch those responsible and secure justice for Olivia." Home Secretary Priti Patel visited the site of the shooting and pledged more money for Merseyside Police to reduce weapons and violence.

The then Liverpool F.C. manager Jürgen Klopp called the killing "such a tragedy" and said "If we can help, we will". Former Everton F.C. manager Frank Lampard encouraged people to inform police if they had information about the attack. Liverpool held a tribute for Olivia Pratt-Korbel during their match against Bournemouth, which was their first match since the shooting. In the following month's Merseyside derby, the fans of the two clubs also paid tribute to her at the ninth minute of the match.
