= Kathryn Thirlwall =

English judge (born 1957)

The Right Honourable Lady Justice Thirlwall DBE
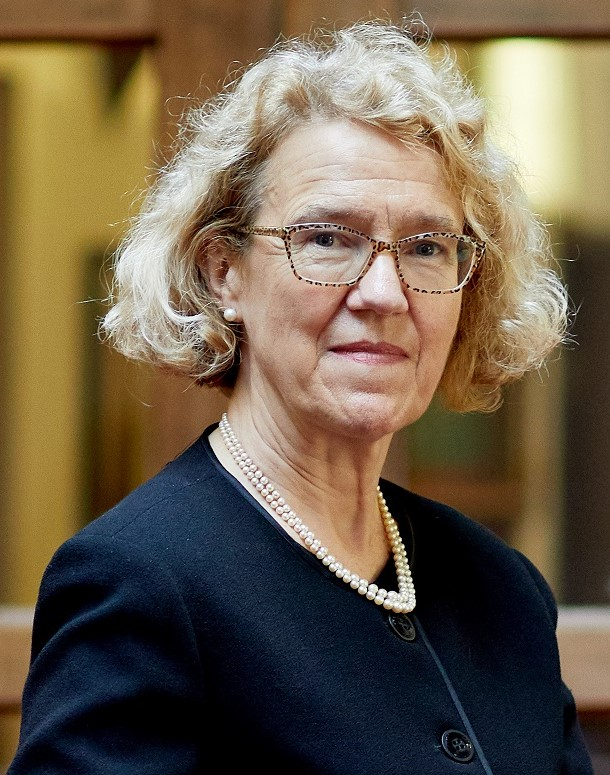

Lady Justice of Appeal
- Incumbent
- Assumed office 2017
- Monarchs: Elizabeth II; Charles III

High Court Judge Queen's Bench Division
- In office 2010–2017
- Succeeded by: Sir Julian Knowles

Personal details
- Born: 21 November 1957 (age 68)
- Education: University of Bristol; Newcastle Polytechnic
- Occupation: Judge

Dame Kathryn Mary Thirlwall, DBE (born 21 November 1957), styled The Rt Hon Lady Justice Thirlwall, is an English judge of the Court of Appeal, and from January 2020 to September 2021 was the Senior Presiding Judge for England and Wales. She practised as a barrister from 1982, was a High Court judge from April 2010, and was promoted to the Court of Appeal of England and Wales in February 2017.

== Early life and education ==
Thirlwall was born on 21 November 1957. She was educated at St Anthony's Girls' Catholic School, a Catholic state school in Sunderland. She then studied at the University of Bristol, graduating with a Bachelor of Arts (BA) degree in 1980. She studied for the Common Professional Examination, a qualification for those without a law degree, at Newcastle Polytechnic; she completed this in 1981.

== Legal career ==
She was called to the bar at Middle Temple in 1982. She specialised in local authority education and abuse litigation. She became a QC in 1999, and served on the Professional Standards Committee of the Bar Council from 1999 to 2005. She became head of chambers at 7 Bedford Row in 2006, and a bencher of Middle Temple in 2008.

Thirlwall was appointed as an assistant recorder in 1998 and then as a recorder in 2000. She was appointed as a High Court judge in April 2010, assigned to the Queen's Bench Division, and received the customary damehood. She was Presiding Judge of the Midlands Circuit from 2011 to 2015. She was promoted to the Court of Appeal of England and Wales in February 2017. She is the Treasurer of Middle Temple for 2025.

== Thirlwall Inquiry ==
In September 2023, the UK government said that she would lead the statutory inquiry into the case of Lucy Letby. In 2025 she said that the enquiry would report in early 2026. It was published on 15 September 2026.
