= Midge Hall railway station =

Former railway station in England

Midge Hall
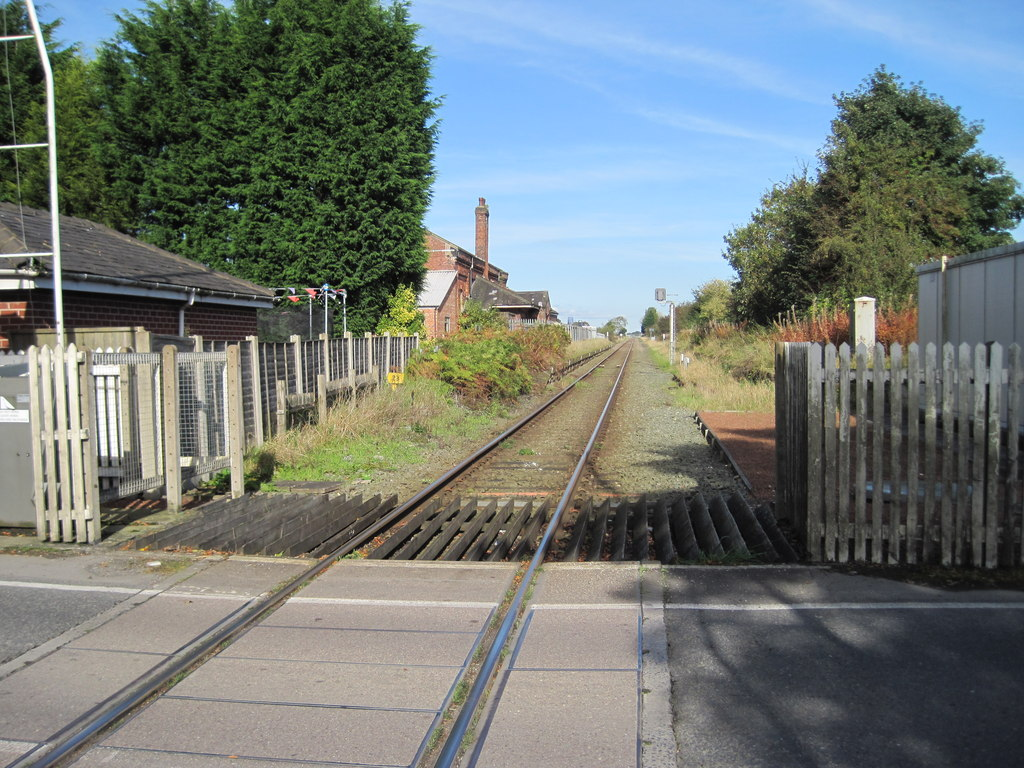
- Site of the former station in 2012, note the stone platform on the left-hand side of the rail, covered in bushes and weeds. The second platform is on the other side, where no rails are, and mostly covered in grass.

General information
- Location: Midge Hall, Lancashire; England
- Coordinates: 53.7031°N 2.7454°W
- Grid reference: SD509231
- Platforms: 2

Other information
- Status: Disused

History
- Original company: Lancashire and Yorkshire Railway
- Pre-grouping: Lancashire and Yorkshire Railway
- Post-grouping: London, Midland and Scottish Railway

Key dates
- October 1859: Opened
- 2 October 1961: Closed
Location

Midge Hall railway station was the railway station for Midge Hall in Leyland, Lancashire. It was opened in 1859 on the railway line between Ormskirk and Preston which later became part of the Lancashire and Yorkshire Railway.

The station closed to passengers in 1961 although the Ormskirk branch line remained open. Since 1991, there have been several calls to reopen the station.

== History ==
The railway line between Preston and Walton was proposed by the Liverpool, Ormskirk and Preston Railway (LO&PJ) and authorised in 1846; later that year the LO&PJ was amalgamated with the East Lancashire Railway (ELR), which opened the line in 1849.

In August 1859 the ELR was amalgamated with the Lancashire and Yorkshire Railway (LYR), and in October that year, the station at Midge Hall was opened. It was 23 1/4 miles (37.4 km) from Liverpool (Tithebarn Street), and replaced an earlier station at Cocker Bar, 23 miles (37.0 km) from Liverpool.

The station was closed by British Railways on 2 October 1961. It retained its original Lancashire and Yorkshire railway signalbox until 1972 until the general Preston area resignalling programme, whereupon the old box was demolished and replaced with a new construction on the opposite side of the level crossing.

Trains still stop at Midge Hall signal box to exchange a token for the single line onward to Rufford - this is a vestige of the 1970s and early 1980s, when the then recently singled branch line retained double track from Midge Hall into Preston. The portion from here north to Farington Curve Junction was also singled in 1983, but the existing combination of track circuit block & key token operation was retained after completion of the work.

== Reopening proposals ==
There have been talks amongst the local community for the possible reopening of the station. A study held in 1991 concluded that there would be a forecasted 7,500 journeys per annum using the station, generating roughly £15,000 in revenue with an average cost of £2 per journey. This was deemed uneconomical due to the high costs of construction (£500,000) coupled with £15,000 in ongoing annual maintenance costs, which would barely be covered by the revenue alone.

A meeting held in 2003 concluded that whilst forecasted passenger numbers will likely be higher than that of the 1991 study (due largely to residential development in recent years), numbers may only be in the region of 10,000 to 30,000 and revenue from these passengers would likely still not cover the costs for reopening and thus remains uneconomical to reopen.

In 2012, the Ormskirk, Preston and Southport Travellers’ Association called talks with Lancashire County Council about the possible reopening of the Midge Hall station as a "key component" of the Council's thinking. In the summer of 2014, Lancashire County Council confirmed that a business case for reopening was being formulated.

Liverpool City Region Combined Authority, Long Term Rail Strategy document of October 2017, page 37, states a review to introduce new Merseyrail battery trains will be undertaken in 2020, in view to put Preston interchange station onto the Merseyrail network by extending the Merseyrail Northern Line from Ormskirk to Preston. The aim is to have Preston one of the terminals of the Northern Line, with Burscough Junction, Rufford and Croston stations brought onto the Merseyrail network. Passengers would have direct trains into Liverpool and Preston. The document states, "The potential use of battery powered Merseyrail units may improve the business case". This will increase the business case to recommission Midge Hall station.

Preceding station	Disused railways	Following station
Preston; Line and station open	Lancashire and Yorkshire Railway; Ormskirk branch line	Croston; Line and station open
Lostock Hall; Line closed, station open	Lancashire and Yorkshire Railway; Ormskirk branch line	Croston; Line and station open
