= Ulnes Walton =

Village in Lancashire, England

Coordinates: 53.662°N 2.733°W

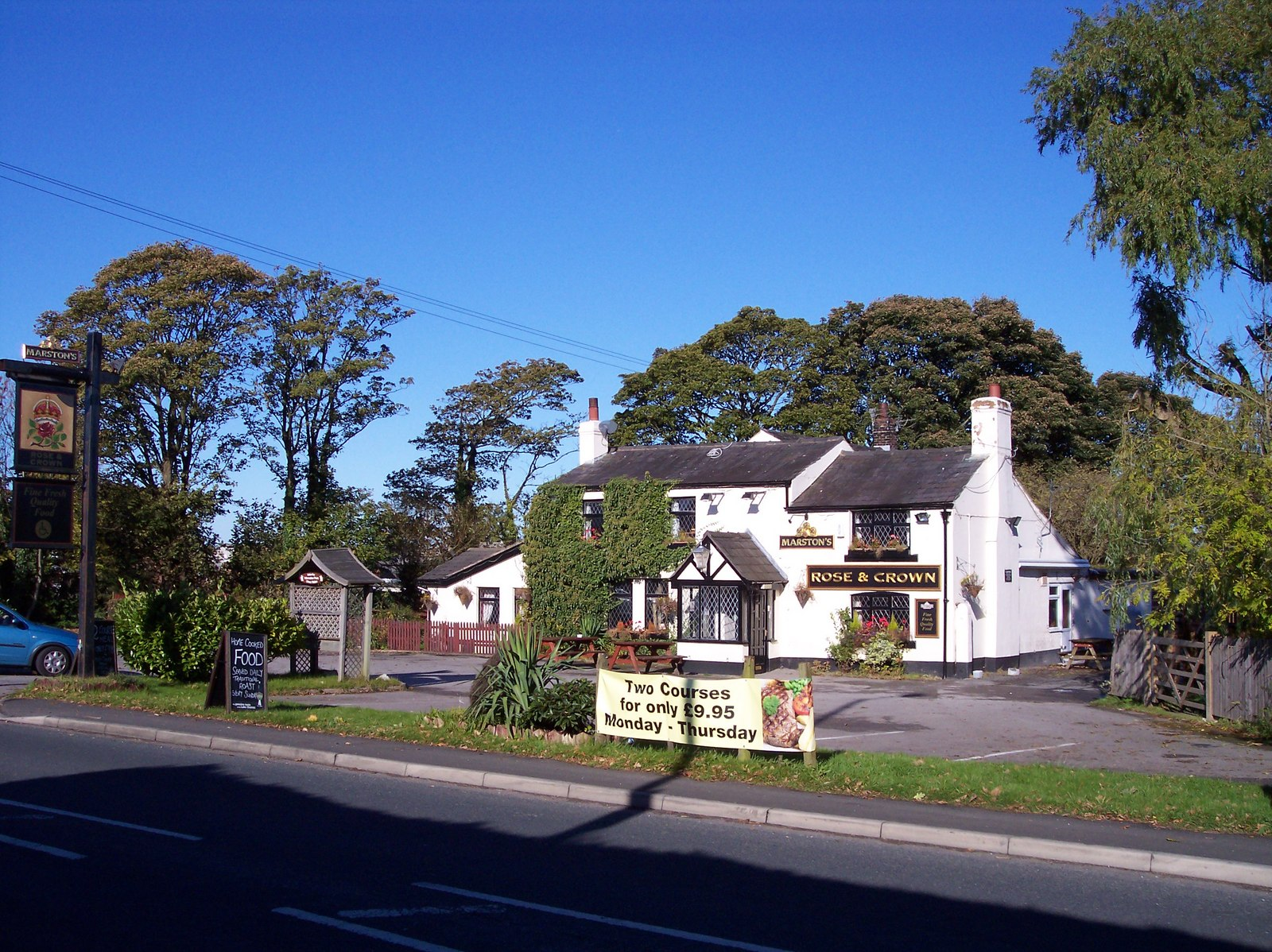
- The Rose and Crown public house

- Shown within Chorley Borough Location within Lancashire
- Population: 2,672 (2011)
- OS grid reference: SD516187
- Civil parish: Ulnes Walton
- District: Chorley
- Shire county: Lancashire
- Region: North West
- Country: England
- Sovereign state: United Kingdom
- Post town: LEYLAND
- Postcode district: PR26
- Dialling code: 01772/01257
- Police: Lancashire
- Fire: Lancashire
- Ambulance: North West
- UK Parliament: Chorley

Ulnes Walton is a village and civil parish of the Borough of Chorley in Lancashire, England. According to the United Kingdom Census 2011 it had a population of 2,672. It is situated about 8 miles (13 km) south west of Preston between Croston and Leyland, with the ecclesiastical parishes of Croston and St James, Leyland, within its boundaries.

The village is the location of two prisons: HM Prison Garth which holds Category B adult males and HM Prison Wymott which holds Category C adult males.

== Origin of the name ==
Ulnes Walton manor was originally a part of the fee or barony of Penwortham. It passed from Bussel to Lacy and then on to the Earlss and Dukes of Lancaster and the Crown. Under the ownership of the lord of Penwortham it was held, by the service of the fifth part of a knight's fee, by a family with the surname Walton. The earliest known member of that family, Ulf de Walton, lived in about 1160. He gave the distinguishing name of Ulf's (Ulnes) to the township. Due to variations in spelling over time, the pronunciation of the name of this village has varied. It is known to have been Oves Walton and Oos Walton.

== History ==
A short distance north of Lostock Bridge, on the eastern side of the road to Leyland, there was until recently a small three-cornered piece of ground enclosed by hedges. This was the pinfold where straying animals were kept in charge of a pinner or pinder, who released them to the owners on payment of one shilling to the overseers of the township. The pinfold is now levelled, the trees bounding it cut down and no trace of it remains.

The bases of two crosses, one behind Lostock Bridge and the Roecroft cross at the junction of Ulnes Walton Lane and Southport Road, are all that remain of praying crosses where coffins were rested on their way to Croston or Eccleston church. There was no church at Moss Side, the west end of Leyland, until 1855.

The story goes that when the Roecroft cross base was moved during road widening it was brought back overnight to its original place. Several times the stone crossed and re-crossed the road until some local lads dressed as ghosts moved it to its present site, and it was not moved again.

There is also Roecroft Farm and Roe Cottage along Ulnes Walton lane, possibly named after the fact there were deer in the area. Over 50 years ago a house which had been roofed by corrugated iron was stripped to reveal the original thatch. Hidden in the thatch was a pair of deer's antlers. Deer poaching brought severe penalties, and this was evidence which could not be destroyed easily; hence the secure hiding place.

Within the boundaries of the township there have been a brickworks and a pottery. The pottery was specialised in the making of glazed earthenware for domestic and garden use.

The oldest established business, which continues to flourish, is that of J.H. Mayor and Sons' saw mills. The firm was established by James Mayor, great-great-grandfather of Henry Mayor, now head of the firm. James Mayor made handloom shuttles and bobbins. His son made bungs for brewers' barrels and clog blocks. The family business progressed and expanded under the next generation, headed by John Henry Mayor with his sons, the eldest of whom, Robert, was the father of the present owner. The firm supplied timber for joiners and wagon builders, as well as smaller items, such as mangle rollers.

Tradition says that Mr J. H. Mayor was able to save a piece of history, for amongst the timber received at the yard was a manger made from a tree trunk, which had been used for feeding horses when Lathom House was besieged by the Parliamentarians in 1645.

There was an old windmill behind the saw mill, described even in 1808 as 'the ruins of a windmill'. It had been used as a malt kiln and had a good well of water, but later fell into disuse, except for storage, and was demolished when the structure became unsafe.

Toll Bar House on Southport Road, no longer standing, was much used when cockle-gatherers passed on their way from Banks to Chorley Market

== See also ==
- Listed buildings in Ulnes Walton
