= Peter Gross (judge) =

British judge

The Right Honourable Sir Peter Gross

Lord Justice of Appeal
- In office 9 July 2010 – 19 October 2019

Personal details
- Born: Peter Henry Gross; 13 February 1952 (age 74) Cape Town, South Africa
- Education: University of Cape Town; Oriel College
- Occupation: Judge and law officer

Sir Peter Henry Gross PC (born 13 February 1952) is a retired judge of the Court of Appeal of England and Wales and judicial commissioner of the Court of Appeal in Brunei.

== Biography ==
=== Early years ===
Born and raised in Cape Town, Gross received his early education there. He received the esteemed Eldon Law Scholarship from the University of Cape Town while studying business sciences there. He then went on to study law at Oriel College in Oxford.

=== Career ===
Gross was called to the Bar in 1977 (Gray's Inn), he practiced business law out of 3 Essex Court, which subsequently changed its name to 20 Essex Street. He became a Queen's Counsel in 1992. Gross was appointed a Recorder in 1995 and a Deputy High Court judge in 1999. In 2001, he was appointed to High Court, receiving the customary knighthood, and was assigned to the Queen's Bench Division. He served as presiding judge on the South East Circuit from 2004 to 2004, and headed the Commercial Court from 2009 to 2010.

On 9 July 2010, Gross became a Lord Justice of Appeal, and was appointed to the Privy Council in 2011. He became Deputy Senior Presiding Judge on 3 October 2011, and was Senior Presiding Judge for England and Wales from 1 January 2013 to 31 December 2015. After retiring in 2019, he went back to work as an arbitrator. In retirement, Gross chaired the Independent Human Rights Act Review, which reported its conclusions in 2021. On 29 October 2023, he was appointed as a Judicial Commissioner of the Court of Appeal in Brunei.

He has served as an international commercial court judge on the DIFC Courts in Dubai.

== Personal life ==
Gross is fond of outdoor activities such as cross-country skiing and sailing.

== Arms ==
Coat of arms of Peter Gross

Notes
Displayed on a painted panel at Gray's Inn.
Crest
In front of an oak tree fructed proper a stag courant guardant between the attires a sword erect proper pommel and hilt Gules.
Escutcheon
Per pale Gules and Azure issuant from each side a demi long-eared spaniel guardant Proper on a chief double enarched reversed per pale Azure and Gules a pair of scales issuant from the top of the escutcheon Or.
Motto
Tenax Nec Labilis

== See also ==
- List of Lords Justices of Appeal
