= Senior Presiding Judge for England and Wales =

The Senior Presiding Judge for England and Wales is a member of the Court of Appeal appointed by the Lord Chief Justice to supervise the Presiding Judges for the various judicial circuits of England and Wales. The Senior Presiding Judge is responsible for deployment and personnel issues for all circuits and acts as a "general point of liaison" for the courts, judiciary and Government.

The post dates to the appointment in 1983 of Sir Tasker Watkins, who remains the longest-serving holder of the office. The arrangement was put on a statutory footing with the enactment of the Courts and Legal Services Act 1990.

== Presiding Judges ==
In each circuit, there are two Presiding Judges appointed by the Lord Chief Justice to preside each of the six circuits in England and Wales, with the exception of the South-Eastern circuit which is supervised by the Lord Chief Justice and two High Court judges. The judge is responsible for the deployment of the judiciary and allocation of cases and for the general supervision of the judiciary in the circuit.

== List of Senior Presiding Judges ==
- 1983: Sir Tasker Watkins VC GBE
- 1991: Sir Anthony McCowan
- 1995: Sir Robin Auld
- 1998: Sir Igor Judge
- 2003: Sir John Thomas
- 1 January 2007: Sir Brian Leveson
- 1 January 2010: Sir John Goldring
- 1 January 2013: Sir Peter Gross
- 1 January 2016: Sir Adrian Fulford
- 3 April 2017: Dame Julia Macur
- 1 January 2020: Dame Kathryn Thirlwall
- 1 October 2021: Sir Charles Haddon-Cave
- 1 October 2022: Sir Andrew Edis
- 1 October 2024: Sir Nicholas Green
- 1 October 2026: Dame Amanda Yip

== Deputy Senior Presiding Judge ==
Following the enactment of the Constitutional Reform Act 2005, increased duties for the Senior Presiding Judge prompted the Lord Chief Justice to appoint a deputy. On four occasions the office has fallen vacant for 21 months or more. Each time was after the incumbent became Senior Presiding Judge.

- 1 January 2006: Sir Brian Leveson
- 1 January 2007: Vacant
- October 2008: Sir John Goldring
- 1 January 2010: Vacant
- 3 October 2011: Sir Peter Gross
- 1 January 2013: Vacant
- 1 January 2015: Sir Adrian Fulford
- 1 January 2016: Dame Julia Macur
- 10 October 2017: Dame Kathryn Thirlwall
- 1 January 2020: Sir Charles Haddon-Cave
- 29 November 2021: Sir Andrew Edis
- 1 October 2022: Vacant
- 1 January 2024: Sir Nicholas Green
- 1 October 2024: Dame Amanda Yip
- 1 October 2026: Sir Jeremy Johnson
