= HM Prison Garth =

Men's prison in Ulnes Walton, England

HMP Garth
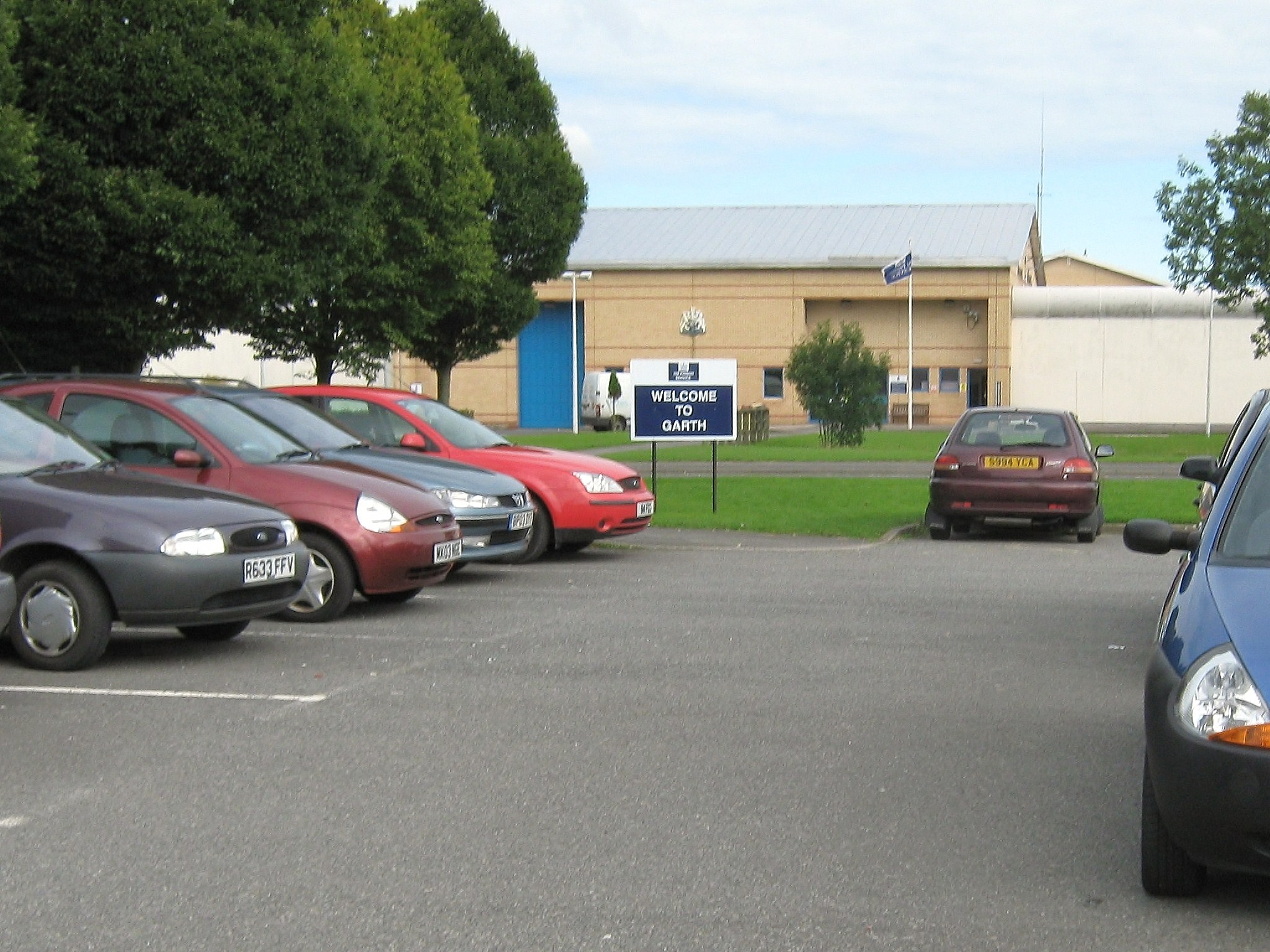

- Location in Chorley Borough Location in Lancashire
- Location: Ulnes Walton, Lancashire; 53°40′49″N 2°45′30″W
- Security class: Adult Male/Category B
- Population: 801 (July 2022)
- Opened: 1988
- Managed by: HM Prison Services
- Governor: Andrew Lund
- Website: Garth at justice.gov.uk

HM Prison Garth is a Category B men's prison, located in the village of Ulnes Walton (near Leyland), in Lancashire, England. Garth is operated by His Majesty's Prison Service, and is situated next to HMP Wymott.

== History ==
Garth Prison was opened in October 1988, and a new residential unit (housing 120 prisoners) opened on 2 July 1997.

In 1998, inmates put out a contract on a police dog called Scooby because of its track record in locating illegal drugs at the jail, requiring home security measures and, once, armed police.

In January 2004, one of Garth's prison chaplains resigned over allegations that she had an affair with a prisoner who worked as a cleaner in the prison chapel. In September 2006 a prison officer from Garth was jailed after it emerged that she had smuggled pills and a mobile phone to an inmate she was having an affair with at the prison.

In August 2007, a report by Her Majesty's Chief Inspector of Prisons praised Garth stating that it was "an essentially safe, respectful prison, with an increased focus on resettlement." However the report also criticised the prison for its race relations and overcrowded accommodation. The prison has since then experienced severe decline.

Further accommodation of 180 places was built at Garth Prison in late 2007 and is notable for being the first prison building to incorporate Interseasonal Heat Transfer.

A fire killed a prisoner on the 24th of September 2025 due to the fire alarm in his cell failing to active after a fire began in his cell.

== The prison today ==
Garth Prison accepts category B prisoners serving sentences of four years or more. Chief Inspector of Prisons, Peter Clarke reported that Garth prison has declined severely during the three years up to 2017. Garth holds 800 male prisoners mostly convicted of serious violent or sexual offences. Garth prison was found to be extremely violent; inspectors said it was the most violent prison they had come across and two-thirds of inmates told inspectors they felt unsafe. There is a big problem with illegal drugs and illegally brewed alcohol, 'hooch'. Many violent incidents are related to drugs, debt and gangs. Many prisoners refuse to leave their cells due to a tense, occasionally threatening atmosphere in the wings. Roughly 85 prisoners additionally to sex offenders are held separately due to fears over their safety. Peter Clarke said, "The prison was one of the most unsafe we have been to in recent times. Violence and drugs dominated the prisoner experience. A new governor and deputy governor were appointed immediately." Conditions at Garth are not exceptional and other prisons are also problematic, a delegation from the European committee for the prevention of torture reported.

Garth provides a range of training, learning and employment opportunities. Programmes on offer include woodwork, motor mechanics, industrial cleaning and light engineering. The prison also offers NVQs in horticulture and textiles, as well as electrical, mechanical and community workshops. A number of basic skills courses are also offered including literacy, numeracy and ESOL. The prison's gym also offers physical education including a YMCA Gym Instructor qualification, as well as recreational gym.

== Notable inmates ==
- Gordon Park
- David Norris
- Joshua Stimpson
