= John Goldring =

British judge (born 1944)

The Right Honourable Sir John Goldring

Deputy Investigatory Powers Commissioner
- Incumbent
- Assumed office 1 September 2017

Intelligence Services Commissioner
- In office 1 January 2017 – 1 September 2017
- Preceded by: Sir Mark Waller

Lord Justice of Appeal
- In office 12 January 2009 – 10 November 2014
- Preceded by: Lord Justice Buxton

Personal details
- Born: John Bernard Goldring; 9 November 1944 (age 81) Leicester, England
- Spouse(s): Wendy, Lady Goldring

Sir John Bernard Goldring (born 9 November 1944) is a British judge. He currently sits as the President of the Cayman Islands Court of Appeal, and serves as the Deputy Investigatory Powers Commissioner. He formerly sat on the Court of Appeal of England and Wales.

== Early life and education ==
John Goldring was born in Leicester and educated at local schools, including Wyggeston Grammar School for Boys. He read law at the University of Exeter, before following a pupillage in the Midlands.

== Career ==
He was called to the bar (Lincoln's Inn) in 1969 and made a Bencher in 1996. He was appointed a Queen's Counsel in 1987. He was a Recorder in the Crown Court from 1987 to 1999, and was appointed a Deputy High Court Judge in 1996. On 1 October 1997, he was appointed to the High Court of Justice and assigned to the Queen's Bench Division; he received the customary knighthood the same year. He was appointed a Lord Justice of Appeal on 12 January 2009, whereupon he was appointed to the Privy Council.

He served as Deputy Senior Presiding Judge from October 2008 until his promotion to Senior Presiding Judge for England and Wales on 1 January 2010. His three-year term ended on 31 December 2012. He also served as a deputy senior judge of the Sovereign Base Areas of Cyprus, a deputy High Court judge, and a judge of the Courts of Appeal of Jersey and Guernsey.

He was appointed as a member of the Judicial Appointments Commission in February 2006, as representative for the judiciary.

It was announced in 2014 that he would be the coroner of fresh inquests for victims of the Hillsborough disaster.
