= Lady in the Lake trial =

2005 murder case involving Gordon and Carol Ann Park

The Lady in the Lake trial was a 2005 murder case in which Gordon Park (25 January 1944 – 25 January 2010) a retired teacher from Leece, near Barrow-in-Furness, Cumbria, England, was jailed for life for the 1976 murder of his first wife, Carol Ann Park.

Carol Park went missing on 17 July 1976, and was never seen alive again by her family. In 1997, her body was discovered by divers in Coniston Water and Gordon Park was arrested on suspicion of murder. Reputedly he said "Oh dear", after being informed they had found her body. The charges were subsequently dropped, but in 2004 Park was arrested again and found guilty of his wife's murder. The trial judge sentenced him to life imprisonment and recommended that he should serve a minimum of 15 years before being considered for parole. He was held at Garth prison, Leyland, Preston. In December 2007, he lodged an appeal against his conviction which was dismissed in November 2008. On 25 January 2010, he was found hanged in his cell, and pronounced dead at the scene.

The details of the murder are unclear. Carol was killed by blunt trauma to her face by means of some instrument; it was discussed in court whether this was an ice axe, the subsequent Appeal Court ruling noted that this was inferred, rather than alleged. She was then bound with rope, using complex knots, weighed down with rocks and lead pipes and thrown overboard from a boat on Coniston Water. The body landed on an underwater ledge where it was later found by amateur divers. Had it been dropped a few metres further from the shore, it would have sunk to the much deeper bottom and probably never have been discovered.

There was a great deal of controversy surrounding the case. Park received much support from his family and friends and maintained his innocence. There was a large amount of local interest in the trial as shown by the sales of the local paper, the North-West Evening Mail. Some claimed that much of the evidence against him could be discounted and there were vigils and petitions in attempts to free Park from prison and clear his name. The case featured prominently in the book No Smoke: The Shocking Truth About British Justice which outlined seven cases the author believed to be examples of innocent people being convicted of murder.

== Case history ==
=== Carol Park vanishes ===
Prior to her disappearance, according to her friends, Carol was feeling depressed. She had talked of tracing her biological parents, as she was adopted. On 17 July 1976, she went missing. Gordon claimed that she had left home for another man, and Carol had left their home in Leece twice before. It was for this reason, Gordon claimed, that he did not report her missing for six weeks. Carol was said to time her periods away from home to coincide with the school holidays. Gordon claimed that it wasn't until she didn't return in time to take up her job as a primary school teacher in September (the start of the school term) that he realised that there was a problem. At this time, he reported her missing via his solicitor, and her family was informed.

On the day she vanished, the family had been due to visit Blackpool on a day trip. However, Carol said she felt unwell and wanted to remain behind in bed. She was never seen alive again by her family. Gordon claimed he returned home to find Carol had left the house, leaving behind her wedding ring, and that there was no sign of a struggle.

A missing persons enquiry was launched, but nothing came of it. This missing persons report was subsequently lost, and it was implied by some that it was because both Gordon and a senior police commander (who, by the time the article was published, had died) involved in the case were freemasons. This was rebutted by Sandra Lean, who, in No Smoke, claimed that Gordon had never been a freemason. At the time, police told Gordon that, should a body be found, he would be the main suspect.

=== Discovery of body and post mortem results ===
On 13 August 1997, amateur divers discovered Carol Park's body, clad only in a nightdress, 75 feet down at the bottom of Coniston Water. She was nicknamed "the Lady in the Lake" by detectives after the 1943 detective novel by Raymond Chandler, The Lady in the Lake. The body had been wrapped in a pinafore dress, a canvas rucksack and plastic bags, tied with several knots, and weighed down with lead piping. Her eyes had been covered by plasters. It was later reported that the body had landed on an underwater ledge, and had it been thrown into the water a few metres farther from the land, it would probably never have been found.

Details of Carol's death were revealed in the post mortem. There were severe injuries to the skull, and it was said that her face had been smashed by multiple blows. It was erroneously described through the media that the court had agreed that the murder weapon had been an ice axe - something which the later Appeal Court hearing corrected. The body was found to be in a foetal position, which suggested that the body had been dealt with within a few hours of death, before rigor mortis could settle in.

It has since been said that the investigators failed to acknowledge that rigor mortis passes in a 24‑ to 48‑hour time period, and that the body could feasibly have been trussed once rigor mortis had passed. Many unusual knots were used to tie the body, and the same knots were said to be used in Gordon Park's house and boat. This was one of the key pieces of evidence used against Gordon in the trial.

=== Gordon Park is arrested, but charges are dropped ===
At the time of the discovery of the body, Gordon and his third wife, Jenny, were on a cycling holiday in France. They heard news of the discovery of the body, and are said to have seen footage of the police searching their house. On 24 August, they arrived home, and Gordon was arrested on suspicion of murder at 8.00am the next morning. He was charged with the murder of Carol Park, and remanded in Preston prison. However, after two weeks, his solicitors managed to persuade the court to grant him bail. On 6 January 1998, the charges against Gordon were dropped due to lack of evidence. The Crown Prosecution Service released a statement saying-

After a conference with leading counsel and the police, a decision was taken, in agreement with all parties, that there was insufficient evidence for a realistic prospect of conviction.

Reportedly he told another inmate that "she deserved it" as he had discovered his wife being unfaithful.

After the charges were dropped, Gordon said that he wished to "try to put all this, including the events of 21 years ago, behind me and try to return to my everyday life". However, the fact that the charges were dropped angered Carol's brother, Ivor Price, who said that he was disgusted by the way that Carol was portrayed in the proceedings, and talked of how Carol was not "someone who [was] cheap or had a string of lovers."

=== Gordon Park's second arrest and trial ===
Gordon was again arrested on 13 January 2004. Police said at the time that the murder file had never been closed, and that the arrest followed new leads. These new leads were later reported to be a confession by Michael Wainwright, who claimed to have been a cellmate of Gordon's during his short prison stay in 1997. The police then revisited the site where the body was discovered, and found a piece of Westmorland green slate, a stone that matched the rocks that made up the wall of the family's bungalow. The case was brought to trial at Manchester Crown Court, and lasted ten weeks.

There was no single piece of evidence that pointed to Gordon indisputably, but the prosecution argued that when the evidence was placed together, it could only point at Park, and not a "mysterious stranger or secret lover". Primarily, the case for the prosecution rested on circumstantial evidence, with the jury being asked to consider knots, rocks used to weight down the body and the ice axe, all linking Gordon Park to the crime. However, the statements of Michael Wainwright, and another of Gordon's cellmates, who had learning difficulties, were also used as evidence by the prosecution. He was sentenced to be jailed for life, and told that he must serve at least 15 years. The judge said that he had taken into account the "terrible concealment" of the body.

Park claimed he and his wife had an open marriage.

The prosecution case suggested that Gordon had first put his hands around Carol's neck to strangle her, but that she had struggled. He then grabbed his ice axe, and brought it down with what was described as "considerable" force on Carol's face, and smashed the front right-hand side of her face, splitting open her head and smashing her teeth. He then did this again – the attack was described as consisting of "two big heavy, crushing blows" by pathologist Dr. Edmund Tapp. Tapp's statements consistently discounted the use of the ice axe itself, although suggested that a similar heavy weapon with both blunt and sharp sides could have been used. After this, Gordon dumped his wife's body in the lake, and went back to his day-to-day life. During the trial, the prosecution speculated that Gordon had "drugged his wife, possibly on or around the 17 July, tied her up and stored her body in a chest freezer before dumping it in Coniston Water".

=== Gordon Park's appeal ===
On 6 December 2007, it was reported that Clarion Solicitors, representing Gordon Park, said that they would launch an appeal. In a public statement, they said:

The appeal is based upon fresh evidence that was not available at the original trial, it is hoped the conviction will be quashed and a retrial ordered... Upon his conviction, Mr Park's family and friends launched a campaign to clear his name, claiming there was no single piece of evidence that pointed indisputably to him.

Representing Park in the appeal was solicitor Rob Rode and Simon Bourne-Arton QC. They did not initially reveal what the new evidence was, only that it was not available at the original trial" and that it was "very strong and significant". Cumbria Constabulary released a statement saying:

Detectives from Cumbria Constabulary carried out a full and thorough investigation and the full facts of the case were presented to the CPS. The case was then tried by a jury, where Gordon Park was found guilty of the murder of Carol Park in 1976.

In October, campaigners in support of Park said "We have in our possession, a signed, witnessed, statement, made this week, by one of the main prosecution witnesses, stating, ‘police officers did put words in my mouth regarding Gordon Park’ and ‘the police told me what to say in court.’" Pastor George Harrison, acting as a spokesperson for the campaigners, also claimed that the appeals process was flawed and "rendered virtually impossible" due to costs.

In November 2008, the appeal bid was rejected by three judges at the Court of Appeal in London. QC Simon Bourne, representing Park, had wanted to call an expert witness to challenge geological evidence used at the trial. Lord Justice Keene said that the new evidence did not raise "a reasonable doubt as to the safety of this conviction", saying that the geological evidence was only a small element of the "strong circumstantial case against the applicant". The new evidence presented by geologist Andrew Moncrief concerned the rock found with the body, said to have been from the wall outside the Parks' house. Moncrief argued that the rock was "indistinguishable" from others in the area, and therefore "meaningless".

=== Gordon Park's death ===
On 25 January 2010, the morning of Park's 66th birthday, he was found hanged and unconscious in his prison cell in Garth Prison, and pronounced dead at the scene later in the morning. It is believed that a ligature was involved, and that Park inflicted the injuries upon himself. Park had not been assessed for the risk of suicide. His son, Jeremy Park, said that "we are all completely devastated and still believe his innocence 100%." Since his death, Carol Park's family has tried to trace her ashes.

=== Review ===
On 26 November 2014, it was confirmed that the Criminal Cases Review Commission (CCRC) was examining the verdict and new DNA evidence had come to light. Carol Park's niece has accused Gordon Park's family of 'clutching at straws' and has argued: "Gordon went to the High Court of Appeal and lost, so what makes them think after all this time they could find any information that could overturn the court's decision?" On 28 October 2018, the CCRC confirmed that they were referring Park's conviction to the court of appeal. The CCRC "considers there is a real possibility that the Court will quash the conviction in light of new evidence". The CCRC released the following findings:

- Evidence undermining the Crown's claim that Park used his mountain climbing axe to murder his wife.
- Evidence undermining the testimony of a prison witness.
- Park was not a contributor to the DNA found on the rope used to tie up his wife's body.
- A rock found in the lake near Mrs Park's remains could not be linked specifically to the rocks found at the Parks' house.

Park's appeal began on 5 November 2019 at the Court of Appeal. On 1 May 2020, his appeal was rejected.

The Court of Appeal noted that the defence had abandoned the argument that the DNA evidence was relevant and concluded that the Crown had not in fact at trial argued the mountain axe recovered from the defendant's home was the murder weapon. It agreed the prison witness and the rock evidence were weakened, but in its view the circumstantial evidence against Park was strong enough for the conviction to be safe. Aside from evidence directly incriminating Park, such as his failure to tell anyone his wife was missing for six weeks or his knowledge of knots, the circumstantial evidence also made it very unlikely that an intruder had committed the crime, or that Mrs. Park had left voluntarily.

== Case controversy ==
=== Support for Park ===
There was much local interest in the matter, as was shown by the sales of the local paper, the North-West Evening Mail, when it ran special editions on the case. Park maintained his innocence, and received much support from his family and friends. His children, Jeremy and Rachael, appointed a new legal team in an attempt to find grounds for appeal. Jeremy also set up a website, www.freegordon.com, in a bid to raise awareness and support of the case for Gordon.

Notable individuals offering support included Tony Benn, who said that there was considerable doubt about Gordon's conviction, and that he would do all he could to help campaign for his freedom. Benn has been quoted as saying the case is a "grave injustice". He is one of over 300 people who have signed the "Gordon Park is Innocent" petition.

A year into Park's life sentence, around forty family members and friends held a vigil at Strangeways Prison in a bid to raise awareness of "the fact that there is an innocent man in prison". Another was held a year later, led by Jenny Park, and a third on the third anniversary of Park's imprisonment. It was due to these vigils, claimed Evangelical Pastor George Harrison, that he was barred from visiting Park once he was transferred to Garth prison, in Lancashire.

Other fronts for the campaign included an offer of £5,000 for anyone providing evidence that led to Gordon's freedom. Included in this were planned adverts in the North-West Evening Mail and leaflets to 20,000 homes in the Furness area. However, this was being organised by Harrison, with whom Gordon and his third wife Jennifer stayed during the trial. Jeremy Park wrote to the North-West Evening Mail to confirm that he wanted nothing to do with the reward, and that Harrison had no right to include his name, contact details or email address, or mention the freegordon website, in the adverts. Subsequently, Harrison claimed to have delivered 6,000 booklets and leaflets in the Furness area.

Not everyone with a link to the family supported Gordon's attempts to clear his name. Vanessa Fisher, Park's adoptive daughter, appeared as a witness for the prosecution at the trial, telling of how her father would hit the children with "a stick or cane" and how he would not discuss his wife's disappearance. She was not in court at the time of Park's sentencing. Ivor Price, Carol's brother, has spoken publicly at various times about his feelings about Gordon, and the Price family even sat away from Park's supporters during the trial itself. In a statement shortly after Park's guilty verdict, he said he had "no doubt" that justice had been done, and added that "Carol was a lovely, bubbly girl who was very clever and intelligent. What has been said about her has been heartbreaking. This was about one thing: justice for Carol."

Around the same time, Price said that although he believed Gordon at the time of Carol's disappearance, upon the news of a body being found in Coniston Water, he "knew it was her, and knew who had done it", expressing his conviction of Park's guilt. More recently, he said that he was "distressed" by the ongoing campaign to free Park. After Park's unsuccessful appeal, Price's daughters, Kay Washford and Claire Gardener spoke to the North-West Evening Mail, their parents having died before the appeal was rejected. Washford said "It is brilliant, an amazing result. Our mum and dad Ivor and Maureen Price fought hard for this justice and now they can rest in peace because justice has been done. We are so thankful for the result and so glad he will be staying in there." She added that "It is finally justice for Carol." The Park family and Cumbria Constabulary did not comment.

=== Claims of flawed investigation ===
The case was reported to be difficult for the prosecution, with the time between the murder and the trial making it extremely difficult to track potential witnesses. Keith Churchman, a police officer involved in the case, said that "the other difficulty was of course the body was taken away from the place where it was killed." However, on top of the difficulties outlined by the police, the freegordon website detailed a number of what Park's supporters claim are holes in the evidence used to convict him.

Bob Woffinden wrote an article for Inside Time, in December 2006, talking about the trial and its controversies. Another similar article, pointing out holes in the evidence, was published in the Sunday Herald, on 23 July 2006.

==== Witnesses ====
The first problem with the evidence is the use of inmate informant evidence, such as that from Michael Wainwright, described as "the most disreputable [form of evidence] of all", despite the fact that it was one of the key pieces of evidence in the trial. Glen Banks, a man with whom Park had briefly shared a cell and who claimed in court that Park had admitted his guilt to him, was described as "highly suggestible", frequently changed his story, and also claimed that Park had admitted to killing Carol while sailing to Blackpool. Wainwright, the other informant, was said to be a heavy cannabis smoker and admitted to hearing voices. He claimed that Gordon had said that he went upstairs, found Carol in bed with another man, and killed her in a fit of rage. This seemed unlikely, as the Parks lived in a bungalow, and the supposed lover has never come forward. Park also claimed to have never actually met Wainwright.

Joan Young, who was the only first-hand witness, is challenged in both articles. She came forward in 2004, claiming that she had seen someone push something over the side of a boat on Coniston Water. This testimony is challenged, because so much time has passed and the fact that her husband saw nothing. However, he claims to have been reading his paper at the time.

Also, it has been said that Young was too far away to identify the person in the boat, and that it couldn't have been Carol Park's body that was being dumped, as the Youngs were positioned so that the location where Carol's body was found would have been visibly blocked by an island. The article even points out that Young described a boat that appeared to be a cruiser yacht. Despite the fact that Gordon did own a large yacht in 1997, in 1976 he owned only a 505 racing dinghy, which he sold later that year.

There are three witnesses who provide direct evidence supporting the idea that Park was innocent. The first, a neighbour, claims that they saw Carol at the bottom of her driveway. A second, another neighbour, claims that they saw an unidentified man in a Volkswagen Beetle in the Parks' drive for twenty minutes. The presence of the unidentified car has never been accounted for. Around 6pm that night, another witness, a woman who knew Carol, saw her at Charnock Richard services. She had mentioned to her husband the fact that Carol had not greeted her, describing her as "snobby".

==== Other evidence ====
The rock supposedly found in the lake, said to be taken from the Parks' garden wall, has been challenged as evidence in multiple places. Both articles say that the police diver had no memory of recovering it, and he claimed that if he had found it, he would have placed it back. Professor Kenneth Pye, a defence witness, said that there was no evidence that the rock had ever been on the lake bed at all. The article in the Sunday Herald also claims that the policeman said to be responsible for finding the rock fainted when it was produced in court, offering no explanation, but still denying that he ever found it.

Two more issues are addressed in the Sunday Herald article. The first is of the knots used to tie up Carol's body – the knots on Carol's body were mostly granny knots, of which there was no evidence that Gordon ever used – indeed during the trial he was specifically asked this, and he responded, "I do not use granny knots". The granny knot is always a mistake, used by someone who should have used a reef knot; those learning knot-tying frequently make this mistake. Gordon Park, an experienced knot-tyer, would likely never use a granny knot, and their frequent appearance on the body of Carol is strong evidence that it was not Gordon who tied them.

The article also claims that the evidence of knots was irrelevant anyway, as climbers and yachtsmen were so common in the area. The other piece of evidence related to another rock taken from the lakebed, which had supposedly come from the Parks' roof. However, the prosecution eventually admitted that Westmorland green slate had been worked in the area for hundreds of years, and could have come from anywhere. The Herald also mentions the fact that the police files from the original missing persons inquiry into Carol Park had gone missing themselves, but does not draw any conclusions from this.

Both articles address the issue of who the killer could alternatively have been, and both of them mention Carol's other lovers, and John Rapson, responsible for murdering Carol's sister. Both of the articles mention that he was in the Barrow area around the time of the murder, but both of them are careful to point out that they are not accusing him of being the murderer.

The Appeal Court itself noted that it was erroneous to conclude that the ice axe was the murder weapon (even though when dismissing the earlier appeal it had, itself, stated this). Indeed, the axe was introduced as evidence by the defence to highlight the variation in its appearance with the description given by Wainwright. Similarly, a wooden axe was also discussed as a potential weapon, but again no direct inference was made. The Appeal Court concluded that the jury would not have felt that the ice axe was hugely relevant to the case.

=== No Smoke ===
On 1 May 2007, No Smoke – The Shocking Truth About British Justice, by Sandra Lean, was published by Exposure Publishing. This book features the stories of seven high-profile convicted murderers, including Park, Luke Mitchell and Sion Jenkins. The book claims that the expert testimonies in the Lady in the Lake trial were flawed, that certain evidence was withheld, and that the sensationalist reporting of the press at the time influenced the court by persuading them that Park was the only person who could have killed his wife.

== Personal life of Gordon Park ==
Gordon Park
- Born: 25 January 1944
- Died: 25 January 2010 (aged 66); HM Prison Garth, Leyland, Lancashire
- Occupation: Retired teacher
- Spouse(s): First – Carol Ann Park, 'The Lady in the Lake'; Second – Catherine Park; Third – Jenny Park
- Children: Vanessa (adopted); Jeremy (mother – Carol); Rachael (mother – Carol)
- Conviction: Murder
- Penalty: Life imprisonment

Park worked as a village primary school teacher, but was retired by the time he was prosecuted for the murder of his first wife, Carol. Park had two children by Carol, Jeremy and Rachael. Gordon and Carol also adopted their niece Vanessa when she was 18 months old after her mother, Christie (who was Carol's sister), was murdered by her boyfriend in 1969, aged 17. This was described as a "rare and appalling coincidence", but has been picked up on by the case for the defence since the trial.

Park remarried twice after Carol was murdered. His second wife was named Catherine, and his third, to whom he remained married until his death, is named Jenny. Park met all of his wives through teaching, Carol was a teacher at Askam Village School when she was killed. When rejecting Park's request for appeal, Lord Justice Keene, Mr Justice Beatson and Mr Justice Macduff noted that both Gordon and Carol had had affairs in the year leading up to Carol's disappearance.

Park's interests included sailing and climbing, which was relevant to the case due to the knots used to tie his wife's body. While in prison, Park spent time practising tai chi, taking a maths degree and keeping fit.

In an exclusive written interview with The Westmorland Gazette nine months into his sentence, Park talked of how he had struggled with prison, saying: "They [other inmates] may smoke incessantly, play loud music, the TV or video games, rifle your drawers, steal, lie etc. There is not a lot you can do about it... I watched a guy "chasing the dragon". It frightened me to death. I had never seen that before." He refused to answer detailed questions about the trial or case, but protested his innocence, saying "If I knew who killed my wife, how, where, why, then I would have said so. I did not know then. I do not know now."
