= HM Prison Wymott =

Men's prison in Lancashire, England

HMP Wymott
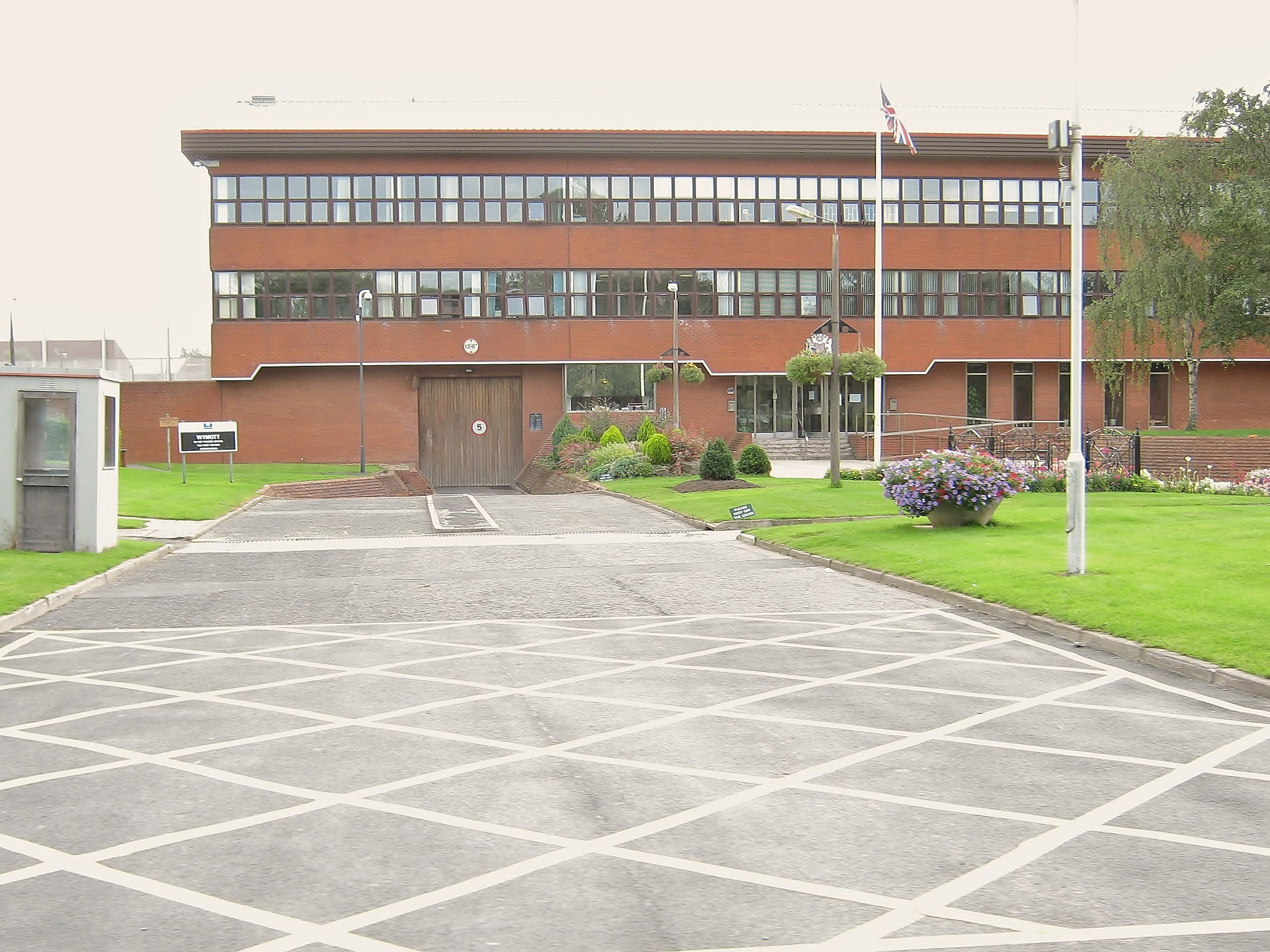
- HM Prison Wymott in August 2010

- Location in Chorley Borough Location in Lancashire
- Location: Ulnes Walton, Lancashire; 53°40′42″N 2°45′01″W
- Security class: Adult Male/Category C
- Population: 1176 (March 2009)
- Opened: 1979
- Managed by: HM Prison Services
- Governor: Steve Pearson
- Website: Wymott at justice.gov.uk

HM Prison Wymott is a Category C men's prison near Leyland, Lancashire, England. Wymott is operated by His Majesty's Prison Service, and is next to HMP Garth. The prison has facilities for housing sex offenders, in addition to inmates sentenced for mainstream offences.

== History ==
Wymott Prison opened in 1979 as short term category C prison. In 1986, there was a large prison riot at Wymott which caused serious damage to the fabric of living units of the jail. In 1993, another major riot left the prison on the brink of total evacuation. Two wings were demolished and replaced with new units as a result of the damage, while the remaining original wings were refurbished and turned into sex offender accommodation.

== Operation ==
Wymott is a Category C prison for adult males. The prison also has facilities for vulnerable prisoners (mainly sex offenders). VPs are housed in units A, B, F, G, & I wings. VPs and Cat C's cook the food for the entire prison and work at tailoring & printing duties, as well as the canteen shop for all local prisons.

The prison works in partnership with Leyland Trucks in training prisoners in key skills in preparation for possible employment such as interview techniques, CV preparation, and aptitude and personality questionnaires. It also has a 70-place Therapeutic Community, which operates independently of the prison itself and aims to help inmates remain drug-free after their release.

== Notable inmates ==
- Ffred Ffransis, Welsh language activist, jailed in September 1986 for direct action around Welsh education rights. The band Llwybr Llaethog released a 7” record inviting listeners to write to him in prison.
- Ched Evans, Welsh international footballer, convicted of rape in 2012 and jailed for five years. Released 17 October 2014.
- Stuart Hall, BBC sports presenter and former It's a Knockout host. Released 16 December 2015.
- Fred Talbot former TV weather man jailed for multiple sexual offences, released in 2019
