= Nicholas Green (judge) =

British judge

The Right Honourable Sir Nicholas Green
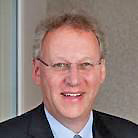

Lord Justice of Appeal
- Incumbent
- Assumed office 2018
- Monarchs: Elizabeth II; Charles III

Justice of the High Court
- In office 2013–2018

Personal details
- Born: Nicholas Nigel Green; 15 October 1958 (age 67)
- Education: University of Leicester; University of Toronto; University of Southampton
- Occupation: Court of Appeal judge
- Profession: Judge

Sir Nicholas Nigel Green (born 15 October 1958) is a judge of the Court of Appeal of England and Wales. He also served as the Chair of the Law Commission of England and Wales between 2018 and 2023. He was appointed Deputy Senior Presiding Judge with effect from January 2024.

He was educated at King Edward VI Camp Hill School for Boys, the University of Leicester (LLB, 1980), the University of Toronto (LLM, 1981) and the University of Southampton (PhD, 1985).

He was called to the bar at Inner Temple in 1986. He was appointed a judge of the High Court of Justice (Queen's Bench Division) in 2013, and was then awarded the customary knighthood in the 2014 Special Honours. In 2018, he was appointed as the Chair of the Law Commission of England and Wales, promoted to the Court of Appeal and received the customary appointment to the Privy Council of the United Kingdom.
