= R (Miller) v The Prime Minister and Cherry v Advocate General for Scotland =

2019 UK Supreme Court constitutional law cases

R (Miller) v The Prime Minister; Cherry v Advocate General for Scotland
- Court: Supreme Court of the United Kingdom
- Full case name: R (on the application of Miller) v The Prime Minister; Cherry and others v Advocate General for Scotland
- Argued: 17–19 September 2019
- Decided: 24 September 2019
- Neutral citation: [2019] UKSC 41

Case history
- Prior history: [2019] EWHC 2381 (QB); [2019] CSIH 49

Holding
- The use of the prerogative power of prorogation is justiciable. The Prime Minister's advice to the Queen, the resulting Order in Council and prorogation were unlawful, void and of no effect because they had "the effect of frustrating or preventing, without reasonable justification, the ability of Parliament to carry out its constitutional functions as a legislature and as the body responsible for the supervision of the executive". Parliament was not prorogued on 9 September 2019 and remained in session.

Court membership
- Judges sitting: Hale, Reed, Kerr, Wilson, Carnwath, Hodge, Black, Lloyd-Jones, Arden, Kitchin, Sales

Case opinions
- Majority: Unanimous

Area of law
- United Kingdom constitutional law; parliamentary sovereignty; royal prerogative

R (Miller) v The Prime Minister and Cherry v Advocate General for Scotland ([2019] UKSC 41), also known as Miller II and Miller/Cherry, are joint landmark constitutional law cases on the limits of the power of royal prerogative to prorogue the Parliament of the United Kingdom. Argued before the Supreme Court of the United Kingdom in September 2019, the case concerned whether the advice given by the prime minister, Boris Johnson, to Queen Elizabeth II that Parliament should be prorogued in the prelude to the United Kingdom's withdrawal from the European Union was lawful.

On 24 September 2019, in a unanimous decision by eleven justices, the court found that the matter was justiciable, and that Johnson's advice was unlawful; this upheld the ruling of the Inner House of the Court of Session in Cherry, and overturned the High Court of Justice's ruling in Miller. As a result, the Order in Council ordering the prorogation was null and of no effect and Parliament had, in fact, not been prorogued.

== Facts ==
Prorogation is a constitutional procedure in the United Kingdom in which the current session of Parliament is terminated so that a new one can be held. The next session is opened during the State Opening of Parliament. While Parliament is out of session, no parliamentary proceedings may take place and any proposed legislation which does not pass prior to prorogation must be re-introduced in the next session of Parliament. Although typically a routine process, there have been several historical cases where prorogation has been controversial.

Comparable contemporary events in other Commonwealth countries that were highly controversial include the 2008 prorogation of the Parliament of Canada, which prevented the prime minister of Canada, Stephen Harper, from losing a vote of no confidence; the 2018 Sri Lankan constitutional crisis, in which the Supreme Court unanimously ruled that President Maithripala Sirisena's attempt to dissolve Parliament was unlawful and void; and "The Dismissal", in which the prime minister of Australia, Gough Whitlam, was dismissed by the Governor-General, John Kerr, and Whitlam's successor, Malcolm Fraser, requested the double dissolution of Parliament in advance of a federal election before the Labor-controlled House of Representatives could reinstate Whitlam.

After the 2017 general election, the government, led by Theresa May, announced that the first session of Parliament after the election would last until 2019—normally, parliamentary sessions last a year—to allow for greater parliamentary scrutiny of their Brexit plans. By May 2019, the session had become the longest to sit since the 1640–60 Long Parliament during the English Civil War. The government's preferred Brexit withdrawal agreement was rejected three times in early 2019, which deepened tensions between opposition politicians, the government, and advocates of a "no-deal Brexit"; Brexit was subsequently delayed until 31 October 2019, and May resigned her leadership of the Conservative Party. May was succeeded in the following party leadership election by Boris Johnson, whose campaign team had floated the possibility of prorogation to force a no-deal Brexit despite Parliament overwhelmingly rejecting the proposition.

Further speculation that Parliament could be prorogued led opposition MPs to successfully amend the Northern Ireland (Executive Formation etc) Bill to make prorogation during late October functionally impossible by requiring the government to report to Parliament its efforts to restore the Northern Ireland Assembly, which Parliament would then sit—even during prorogation—to debate. In late July, the newly appointed Leader of the House of Commons, Jacob Rees-Mogg, said the government viewed prorogation for political purposes as an "archaic mechanism" which would not be used. Despite this, Johnson still planned to have Parliament prorogued, and sought legal advice in mid-August from his Attorney General, Geoffrey Cox, to that effect.

On 28 August 2019, Jacob Rees-Mogg, in the role of Lord President of the Council, convened a small Privy Council meeting with the Queen whilst she was in residence at Balmoral Castle. (Note: In the absence of legislation which provides otherwise, the quorum for a Privy Council meeting is three.) The Queen gave her consent to prorogation, to start between 9 and 12 September, and end with the State Opening of Parliament on 14 October. The prorogation ceremony in Parliament took place in the early hours of 10 September 2019 amidst tense scenes in the House of Commons—its Speaker, John Bercow, described such a long prorogation as an "act of executive fiat"—and opposition boycotts of the ceremony in the House of Lords. The announcement of prorogation led to two cases being immediately filed—one in England by Gina Miller and one in Northern Ireland by Raymond McCord—and for the applicants in a third case in Scotland headed by Joanna Cherry to request their case to be expedited.

=== Miller and McCord ===
Gina Miller (who had previously defeated the government on the use of the royal prerogative in R (Miller) v Secretary of State for Exiting the European Union) in late August, following the government's announcement of the prorogation, made an urgent application for judicial review of the use of prerogative powers at the High Court of Justice for England and Wales in London. Her application to the High Court was in fact heard by a Divisional Court which comprised Lord Burnett (Lord Chief Justice of England and Wales), Sir Terence Etherton (Master of the Rolls) and Dame Victoria Sharp, DBE, (President of the Queen's Bench Division), three senior judges who would normally sit in the Court of Appeal. Victims' rights activist Raymond McCord made an application at the High Court of Northern Ireland in Belfast which alleged breaches of the Good Friday Agreement. Both cases were rejected as non-justiciable: the three judges in the High Court of Justice of England and Wales unanimously rejected Miller's case on 6 September; while the High Court of Northern Ireland did not address the aspects of McCord's case to do with prorogation in its judgment on 12 September since it was already the "centrepiece" of the English and Scottish cases.

=== Cherry ===
At the end of July 2019, a group of 78 parliamentarians, led by Scottish National Party (SNP) justice spokeswoman Joanna Cherry and barrister Jolyon Maugham, had made an application for judicial review to the Outer House of Scotland's highest court, the Court of Session in Edinburgh. (Note: Cherry and Maugham's co-litigants were Jo Swinson, Ian Murray, Geraint Davies, Hywel Williams, Heidi Allen, Angela Smith, Peter Hain, Jenny Jones, Janet Royall, Robert Winston, Stewart Wood, Debbie Abrahams, Rushanara Ali, Tonia Antoniazzi, Hannah Bardell, Roberta Blackman-Woods, Ben Bradshaw, Tom Brake, Karen Buck, Ruth Cadbury, Marsha de Cordova, Ronnie Cowan, Neil Coyle, Stella Creasy, Wayne David, Emma Dent Coad, Stephen Doughty, Rosie Duffield, Jonathan Edwards, Paul Farrelly, James Frith, Ruth George, Stephen Gethins, Preet Kaur Gill, Patrick Grady, Kate Green, Lilian Greenwood, John Grogan, Helen Hayes, Wera Hobhouse, Margaret Hodge, Rupa Huq, Ruth Jones, Ged Killen, Peter Kyle, Ben Lake, David Lammy, Clive Lewis, Kerry McCarthy, Stuart McDonald, Anna McMorrin, Carol Monaghan, Madeleine Moon, Layla Moran, Jess Phillips, Lloyd Russell-Moyle, Liz Saville Roberts, Tommy Sheppard, Andy Slaughter, Owen Smith, Chris Stephens, Jo Stevens, Wes Streeting, Paul Sweeney, Gareth Thomas, Alison Thewliss, Stephen Timms, Anna Turley, Catherine West, Matt Western, Martin Whitfield, Philippa Whitford, Paul Williams, Daniel Zeichner, Caroline Lucas, Rosena Allin-Khan and Luciana Berger. ([2019] CSOH 70)) The application was made to the court in Scotland because it sat during the summer—unlike its English counterpart—and was made in anticipation of a public u-turn on the matter from the government. The litigants sought a ruling that prorogation to avoid parliamentary scrutiny would be unconstitutional and unlawful. The government averred that the petition was "hypothetical and premature" and "that there was no reasonable or even hypothetical apprehension" that the government intended to advise that the Queen prorogue Parliament in order to prevent parliamentary scrutiny of its Brexit plans, and confirmed that averment on 23 August and 27 August. When prorogation was announced on 28 August, the Cherry hearing was expedited to the following week and the applicants made an application for an interim interdict; two days later, Lord Doherty refused the request as he was not satisfied there was a "cogent need" for one.

During the Court of Session hearings on 3 September, the court heard evidence that Johnson had approved negotiations with the Palace on 15 August 2019, by way of signing a handwritten note to his special adviser Nikki da Costa and Dominic Cummings, and made comments about the short sitting of Parliament in September being a "rigmarole" to show MPs were "earning their crust". Aidan O'Neill, who represented the petitioners at the Court of Session, argued that this proved the government misled the court when they described the issue of prorogation as an academic one.

On 4 September, Doherty ruled in the first instance that the matter was non-justiciable; the case was immediately appealed to the Inner House of the Court of Session. On 11 September, the three-judge appellate panel at the Court of Session, consisting of Lords Carloway (Lord President), Brodie, and Drummond Young, unanimously found the prorogation was unlawful. The court found Johnson was motivated by "improper purpose of stymieing Parliament" and had effectively "misled the Queen", and as a result, declared the royal proclamation as "null and of no effect", but did not offer a binding remedy to that effect.

The three appeal judges of the Inner House of the Court of Session noted that O'Neill made "interesting and stirring" remarks about a Scottish tradition of holding the Crown to account; the judges stated O'Neill had "not actually identified any material differences between the applicable Scots law and the corresponding English law" and his argument was "pushing at an open door".

=== Hearing ===
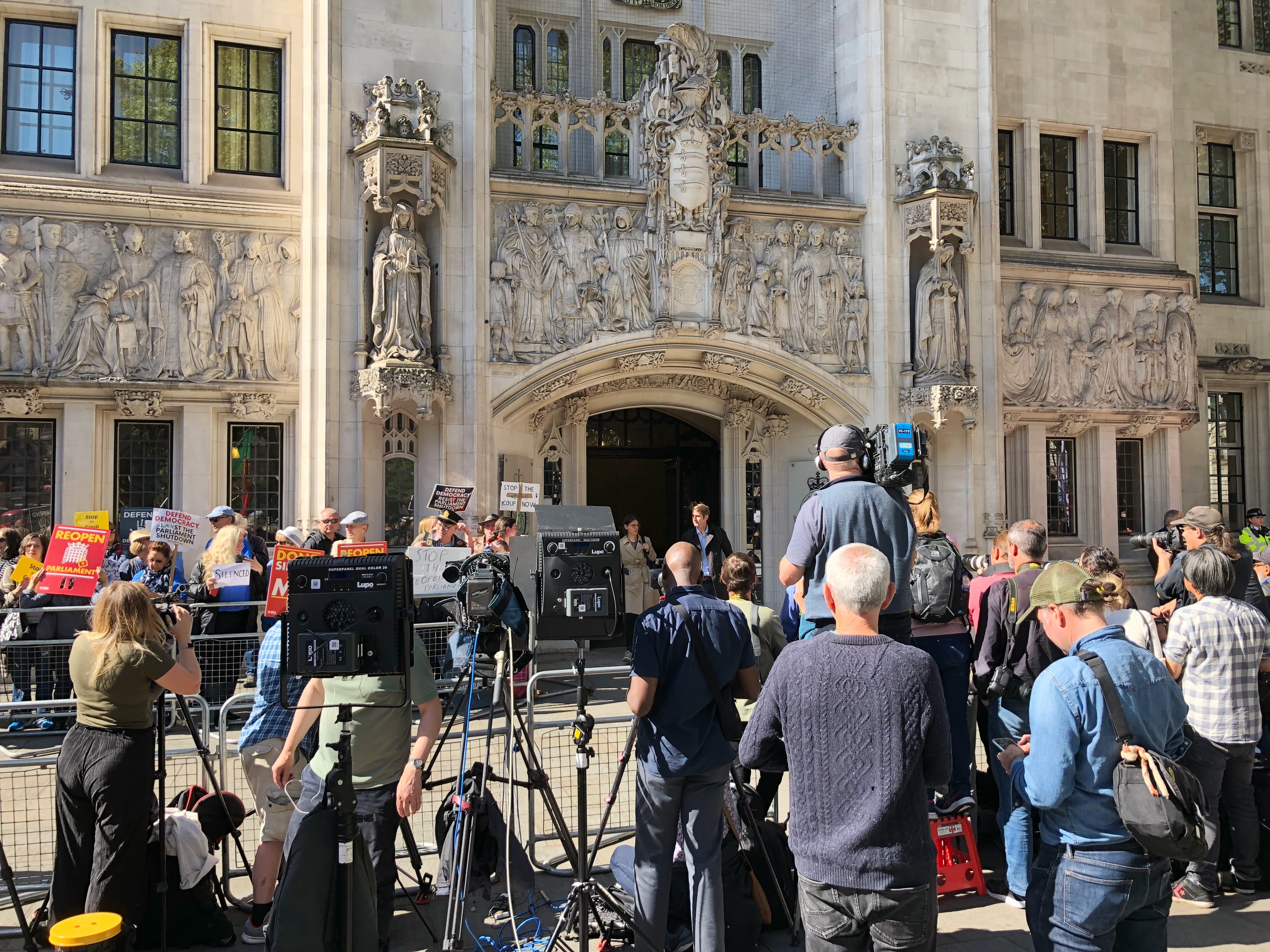
Press and anti-prorogation protesters assemble outside the Supreme Court on 17 September 2019

To resolve the fundamental differences between the senior courts of England and Wales and Scotland, both the Miller and Cherry cases were appealed to the Supreme Court of the United Kingdom; the former skipped the Court of Appeal as a "leapfrog appeal". (Note: It had in fact already been heard by three of the most senior judges who sit in the Court of Appeal: see above.) The Supreme Court began a three-day emergency hearing to consider the appeals on 17 September 2019. Due to the significance of the case, the maximum eleven of the twelve Supreme Court justices sat to hear the appeal, with Lord Briggs not sitting to ensure an odd number of judges. The case was only the second case heard by eleven justices in the Supreme Court's history; the first was R (Miller) v Secretary of State for Exiting the European Union (2017), which delivered an 8–3 verdict that the royal prerogative could not be used to invoke Article 50 of the Treaty on European Union. The court allowed six interveners to make representations over the course of the hearing: Raymond McCord, whose case was not heard alongside Miller and Cherry; the Lord Advocate for Scotland, James Wolffe; the Counsel General for Wales, Jeremy Miles; former prime minister John Major; the Shadow Attorney General, Shami Chakrabarti; and The Public Law Project.

The first day of the hearing heard representations from the challengers of each lower court case. The Advocate General for Scotland, Lord Keen, argued that the government was entitled to prorogue Parliament for political purposes, as Clement Attlee did in 1948 when he called a short pro forma session of Parliament to hasten the passage of the Parliament Act 1949, and that Parliament had adequate recourse to prevent prorogation if it did not wish to be prorogued. He also argued that in declaring the prorogation void, the Court of Session ruled outside its jurisdiction. When asked by the court whether Johnson would prorogue Parliament for a second time, Keen did not answer. Lord Pannick, who responded on Miller's behalf, argued that there was "strong evidence" that the purpose of prorogation was to prevent MPs from "frustrating" the government's Brexit plans, and that the court was entitled and obligated to deliver verdicts on the rule of law.

The second day heard from the victors in each lower court case; the government, represented by James Eadie, argued that prorogation was "a well-established constitutional function exercised by the executive" and that decisions about prorogation were matters of "high policy". Eadie argued that in the absence of legislation that regulated the power of prorogation, it was not appropriate for the judiciary to "design a set of rules" to judge prorogation by; when asked by the justices how prorogation was compatible with parliamentary sovereignty, he answered that prorogation always had the effect of temporarily suspending parliamentary scrutiny, and parliamentarians could continue scrutinising the government once Parliament resumed. Eadie was also questioned why there was no signed witness statement that testified to the reasons for prorogation. O'Neill, who represented the Cherry litigants, argued that the decision to prorogue was "taken in bad faith" and "for an improper purpose" and that the Court of Session opinion offered an outsider perspective "400 miles from Westminster" to that effect. O'Neill agreed with Eadie that it would not be appropriate for the Court to create such rules, but argued that it was nevertheless "the province of the courts" to decide whether prorogation was constitutional.

The final day of the hearing saw interventions from other interested parties: Major's former Solicitor General, Lord Garnier, argued prorogation was "motivated by a desire to prevent Parliament interfering with the Prime Minister's policies during that period"; the Scottish Government, who were represented by the Lord Advocate, argued prorogation had a "profoundly intrusive effect" on Parliament; McCord's advocate Ronan Lavery argued prorogation was designed to "run down the clock" to force a no-deal Brexit, which would in turn result in controls on the border with Ireland; and in a written submission, the Shadow Attorney General, Shami Chakrabarti, said that if the power to prorogue was unchecked, Parliament would be "deprived" of the ability to "perform its constitutional function". The hearing ended with the government and the petitioners summing up their arguments: Keen re-iterated the argument that the courts were constitutionally "not properly equipped" to decide on matters of high policy; and Pannick requested the court make a declaration that prorogation was unlawful and for Parliament to be recalled as a result.

== Judgment ==
For the purposes of the present case, therefore, the relevant limit upon the power to prorogue can be expressed in this way: that a decision to prorogue Parliament (or to advise the monarch to prorogue Parliament) will be unlawful if the prorogation has the effect of frustrating or preventing, without reasonable justification, the ability of Parliament to carry out its constitutional functions as a legislature and as the body responsible for the supervision of the executive. In such a situation, the court will intervene if the effect is sufficiently serious to justify such an exceptional course.

— R (on the application of Miller) v The Prime Minister; Cherry and Others v Advocate General for Scotland [2019] UKSC 41 at para. 50 (24 September 2019)

On 24 September, the eleven-justice panel of the Supreme Court ruled unanimously that the prerogative power of prorogation was justiciable and the ongoing prorogation of Parliament was both unlawful and void. The court utilised a three-prong test in determining the case:

- Was the matter justiciable? The court ruled that it was, as the lawfulness of government actions had been subject to judicial review "for centuries," referring to the 1611 Case of Proclamations which ruled that "the King hath no prerogative but that which the law of the land allows him". The court also found that the use of the prerogative power of prorogation is a use of the royal prerogative that was open to judicial review, as no party in the case argued that the court did not have the jurisdiction to rule on the existence or limits of the power of prorogation.
- What are the limits to that power? Referring to the constitutional principles of Parliamentary sovereignty and Parliamentary accountability, the court ruled "that a decision to prorogue (or advise the monarch to prorogue) will be unlawful if the prorogation has the effect of frustrating or preventing, without reasonable justification, the ability of Parliament to carry out its constitutional functions as a legislature and as the body responsible for the supervision of the executive." The court also ruled that if it did have that effect, there would be no need to rule on whether the motives of the executive were lawful.
- Did it have that effect? Contrary to an ordinary prorogation in preparation for a State Opening of Parliament, which lasts for 4–6 days, Parliament was prorogued for five out of the possible eight weeks from the return from summer recess and the scheduled date for Brexit, which prevented Parliament from carrying out its democratic duty to scrutinize the government, unlike a recess which does not. The court also struck down the only evidence for why it was taken, a memorandum from Nikki da Costa which only addresses the desired date for a State Opening, as insufficient for justifying the necessity for the preceding prorogation against the backdrop of a "fundamental" constitutional change, which had an "extreme" effect on the country's democracy. Consequently, the court ruled that it did have that effect, ruling the prime minister's advice unlawful.
- "What is the legal effect of this finding?" The court disagreed with the government that the prorogation was a "proceeding in Parliament" protected from judicial review; instead, the court ruled the reverse that prorogation is imposed upon from outside and thus not debatable by Parliament, and brings those protected proceedings in Parliament to an end. Consequently, the court agreed with the Inner House of the Court of Session that the resulting prorogation was null and of no effect and quashed the relevant Order in Council, which meant the effect of the royal proclamation of prorogation had the legal effect of "a blank piece of paper". As a result, the court ruled that "Parliament has not been prorogued", and reverted the 2017–2019 parliament into being in session.

== Significance ==
The judgment is significant for its treatment of the principle of justiciability, its interpretation of elements of the British constitution, and its potential implications for the separation of powers. In a Financial Times article published the day after the judgment, Catherine Barnard, a professor of European law at the University of Cambridge, called it "a judgment of huge importance with major implications for our system of government" in which the court set down a ruling to stop constitutional players "who don't play by the rules". Constitutional historian Vernon Bogdanor, professor at King's College, London said that the judgment reaffirmed parliamentary sovereignty. Cambridge professor Mark Elliott, former legal adviser to the House of Lords' Constitution Committee, described the judgment as both "an orthodox application of constitutional principle" and a legal landmark for transforming the principle of parliamentary sovereignty into "hard and novel limits on executive authority".

By contrast, Richard Ekins, an associate professor of law at the University of Oxford, called it "a startling judgment" that was "badly mistaken" and that the court showed "a clear loss of faith in the political process" when it ruled in an area that he and many other lawyers previously thought it did not have jurisdiction to do so. Ekins called for the decision to be reversed by statute in order to protect parliamentary sovereignty.

In the same vein, John Finnis, professor emeritus of law and legal philosophy at the University of Oxford, considered that the Supreme Court had "forayed" into politics, calling the judgment "a historic mistake" and "a misuse of judicial power". According to Finnis, prorogation is ruled by conventions, not by justiciable law, therefore the matters of prorogation have to be dealt with by Parliament itself and the court has no say in them.

The speakers of both the House of Lords and House of Commons stated the ruling had quashed royal assent of the Parliamentary Buildings (Restoration and Renewal) Act 2019—which had royal assent signified during the prorogation ceremony—and therefore royal assent had to be re-signified. Yuan Yi Zhu, a Stipendiary Lecturer in Politics at Pembroke College, Oxford, argued that this was a misunderstanding by parliamentary authorities due to ambiguity in the judgment, ironically implicating the sovereignty of Parliament contrary to Article IX of the Bill of Rights 1689 and the enrolled bill rule; Zhu suggested a short bill should be passed to "reassert Parliamentary sovereignty and minimise the risk of its erosion" by the judiciary.

=== Fixed-term Parliaments Act ===
In evidence to the House of Lords Constitution Committee, Junade Ali—editor of A Federal Constitution for a Federal Britain —argued that as a result of the Fixed-term Parliaments Act 2011, the executive was unable to dissolve Parliament and thus resorted to prorogation. He noted there was an apparent misconception about the composition of Parliament: "It is fundamental within the precepts of the principles of Parliamentary Sovereignty that a chamber of the legislature is not sovereign, it is instead the Queen-in-Parliament which is sovereign." Ali reiterated an argument he made before the judgment in the Oxford University Political Blog that in lieu of dissolution and prorogation, future prime ministers may ask the sovereign to refuse royal assent to any bill until the House of Commons agreed to call an early general election, which he argued would likely cause far greater public outrage than prorogation. Ali invoked an A. V. Dicey argument that—where Parliament is sovereign—dissolution is necessary both for security and harmony between the government and Parliament, and concluded that: "Paradoxically, in its quest to control its own destiny, the House of Commons might achieve the opposite."

Robert Blackburn, a Professor of Constitutional Law at King's College London, argued in a different submission to the same committee that repeal or reform of the Fixed-term Parliaments Act 2011 would potentially provide a convenient opportunity for prorogation to become subject to a vote in both Houses of Parliament on a motion moved by the government – but did not consider the potential impact on the prerogative power of royal assent. Robert Craig of the University of Bristol also argued that powers in the British constitution are fused, and that "the FtPA has upset this delicate balance". Craig argued the Act should accordingly be repealed and replaced, and argued against legislation to make norms in the parliamentary system more rigid by comparing such attempts to "trying to pop a balloon half way."

The Early Parliamentary General Election Act 2019 received royal assent on 31 October 2019 in order to sidestep the need for a two-thirds majority for an early parliamentary general election. In the 2019 United Kingdom general election, the Conservative party won an overall majority. The Conservative election manifesto contained a pledge to reform judicial review such that it "is not abused to conduct politics by another means". The Queen's Speech after the election also announced the government's intention to uphold their manifesto commitment to repeal the Fixed-term Parliaments Act.

=== Political reaction ===
In a statement delivered in person to journalists on College Green—near Parliament and the Supreme Court's seat in the Middlesex Guildhall—Commons Speaker John Bercow announced that Parliament would sit on the following day from 11:30 am. Prime Minister's Questions was not scheduled for its regular Wednesday midday slot, but Bercow said he would allow urgent questions and applications for emergency debates to be heard. Boris Johnson, who was in New York City to give a speech before the United Nations General Assembly, brought forward his speech from the morning of 25 September to the evening of 24 September to allow him to fly back to Britain in time for the parliamentary sitting. Johnson said that he "strongly disagreed" with the ruling, but the government would "respect the judicial process" and not prevent Parliament from meeting; he also stated his preference for a new parliamentary session and Queen's Speech after a lawful prorogation.

After the ruling, Johnson was criticised by opposition leaders: Labour leader Jeremy Corbyn brought forward his conference keynote speech and invited Johnson to "consider his position and become the shortest-serving prime minister there's ever been"; SNP leader Nicola Sturgeon demanded Johnson's resignation and urged Parliament to table a motion of no confidence if he did not resign; Liberal Democrat leader Jo Swinson said that Johnson was not "fit to be Prime Minister"; and Brexit Party leader Nigel Farage called prorogation "the worst political decision ever" and called on Johnson to fire his adviser Dominic Cummings for suggesting the plan.

The first item of debate in Parliament was an urgent question by Cherry to the Attorney General, Geoffrey Cox. Cherry urged Cox to publish the legal advice he gave to Johnson on the subject of prorogation to avoid him being labelled as a scapegoat for the affair; Cox replied that he would consider whether its publication would be in the public interest. He defended the advice he gave to Johnson on the constitutionality of the prorogation as being "in good faith", and that other senior legal professionals and lower courts agreed with the government's arguments. Cox also repeated Johnson's statement from the previous day that the government accepted the ruling, and rebuked comments which attacked the independence of the judiciary; in particular, he disagreed with Jacob Rees-Mogg's description of the judgment as a "constitutional coup" and said that the motives of the judiciary were not to be questioned.

The Dissolution and Calling of Parliament Act 2022 would prevent, in the future, courts from questioning the exercise of the royal prerogative power to dissolve Parliament, though would not affect the ability for courts to question a future prorogation.

=== International application ===
In January 2025, Canadian prime minister Justin Trudeau's prorogation of the House of Commons during a political crisis was challenged in the Federal Court citing Miller II. During arguments, government lawyers argued that Miller II's holding that the constitutional role of Parliament by prorogation could be distinguished because of the unique scenario with the British Parliament's role in relation to an imminently approaching Brexit. Government lawyers also argued that unlike the uncodified Constitution of the United Kingdom, which was silent on required Parliamentary sittings, Section 5 of the Canadian Charter of Rights and Freedoms required annual sittings providing a check on the power. In March 2025, Federal Court Chief Justice Paul Crampton agreed that the advice to prorogue was justiciable, but ultimately declined to adopt Miller II. He concluded the applicants had failed to establish that Trudeau had breached the Charter or any other legal limits on the power, and dismissed the case.

== Summary of judgments ==
Court	Judge	Opinion	Date
CSOH (Scotland)	Lord Doherty	Non-justiciable	4 September
EWHC (QB) (England) (Wales)	The Lord Burnett of Maldon (LCJ)	Non-justiciable	6 September
EWHC (QB) (England) (Wales)	Sir Terence Etherton (MR)	Non-justiciable	6 September
EWHC (QB) (England) (Wales)	Dame Victoria Sharp (PQBD)	Non-justiciable	6 September
CSIH (Scotland)	Lord Carloway (LP)	Unlawful	11 September
CSIH (Scotland)	Lord Brodie	Unlawful	11 September
CSIH (Scotland)	Lord Drummond Young	Unlawful	11 September
NIQB	Lord Justice McCloskey	No comment	12 September
UKSC (United Kingdom)	The Baroness Hale of Richmond (P)	Unlawful	24 September
UKSC (United Kingdom)	Lord Reed (DP)	Unlawful	24 September
UKSC (United Kingdom)	The Lord Kerr of Tonaghmore	Unlawful	24 September
UKSC (United Kingdom)	Lord Wilson of Culworth	Unlawful	24 September
UKSC (United Kingdom)	Lord Carnwath of Notting Hill	Unlawful	24 September
UKSC (United Kingdom)	Lord Hodge	Unlawful	24 September
UKSC (United Kingdom)	Lady Black of Derwent	Unlawful	24 September
UKSC (United Kingdom)	Lord Lloyd-Jones	Unlawful	24 September
UKSC (United Kingdom)	Lady Arden of Heswall	Unlawful	24 September
UKSC (United Kingdom)	Lord Kitchin	Unlawful	24 September
UKSC (United Kingdom)	Lord Sales	Unlawful	24 September

== See also ==
- Entick v Carrington (1758), which held that the executive's power to undertake certain acts was constrained by statutory and common law.
- Marbury v. Madison (1801), a U.S. Supreme Court case which held that the judiciary was entitled and obliged to undertake judicial review of the laws.
- Attorney-General v De Keyser's Royal Hotel Ltd (1920), which held that the royal prerogative could not be used to circumvent statutory law.
- Australian Communist Party v Commonwealth (1951), a High Court of Australia case which held that a law forcefully dissolving the Communist Party of Australia violated the Constitution of Australia's provisions on the separation of powers.
- Burmah Oil Co Ltd v Lord Advocate (1965), which held that the executive cannot exercise prerogative powers so as to deprive people of their property without the payment of compensation.
- Council of Civil Service Unions v Minister for the Civil Service (1984), which held that the royal prerogative was subject to judicial review.
- R v Secretary of State for the Home Department, ex parte Fire Brigades Union (1995), which held that a minister's political accountability to Parliament did not render them immune from legal accountability in the courts.
- R v Chaytor (2010), which held that the protection of parliamentary proceedings under the Bill of Rights 1689 did not give MPs indicted as a result of the parliamentary expenses scandal protection from prosecution for false accounting.
