= R (Miller) v Secretary of State for Exiting the European Union =

UK Supreme Court constitutional law decision

- Court: Supreme Court of the United Kingdom
- Full case name: R (on the application of Miller and another) v Secretary of State for Exiting the European Union; R (on the application of the Attorney General for Northern Ireland) v Secretary of State for Exiting the European Union and the Secretary of State for Northern Ireland, ex parte Agnew and others (Northern Ireland); R (on the application of McCord) v Secretary of State for Exiting the European Union and the Secretary of State for Northern Ireland (Northern Ireland)
- Argued: 5–8 December 2016
- Decided: 24 January 2017
- Neutral citation: [2017] UKSC 5
- Reported at: [2016] EWHC 2768 (Admin); [2016] NIQB 19

Case history
- Prior actions: For the Miller and Dos Santos application only: Divisional Court (Queen's Bench Division) of the High Court (England and Wales) (EWHC (QBD)); Referred from: For the McCord application: Court of Appeal (Northern Ireland) (NICA); For the application by the Attorney General for Northern Ireland: Divisional Court (Queen's Bench Division) of the High Court (Northern Ireland) (NIQB)

Holding
- An invocation of Article 50 of the Treaty on European Union would remove rights enacted through primary legislation, and therefore may not be done by royal prerogative without enabling primary legislation.; The Sewel Convention and other devolution laws do not require the permission of the devolved assemblies of Scotland, Wales and Northern Ireland.

Court membership
- Judges sitting: Neuberger, Hale, Mance, Kerr, Clarke, Wilson, Sumption, Reed, Carnwath, Hughes, Hodge

Case opinions
- Majority: Neuberger, Hale, Mance, Kerr, Clarke, Wilson, Sumption, Hodge
- Concur/dissent: Reed, Carnwath, Hughes (all dissented on royal prerogative point; all concurred on devolution point)

Area of law
- European Union (Notification of Withdrawal) Bill 2017; European Communities Act 1972; European Union Referendum Act 2015; Political Parties, Elections and Referendums Act 2000; Scotland Act 1998; Scotland Act 2012; Scotland Act 2016; Government of Wales Act 1998; Government of Wales Act 2006; Wales Act 2014; Northern Ireland Act 1998; Northern Ireland Act 2006; Northern Ireland Act 2009; Parliamentary sovereignty; Royal prerogative; Treaty on European Union (TEU); Lisbon Treaty; Maastricht Treaty; European Union (EU); European Union (EU) law; Council of the European Union (EU) (Consilium); Scotland; Wales; Northern Ireland; Scotland Office; Northern Ireland Office; Devolution; Sewel Convention; Foreign affairs of the United Kingdom; Secretary of State for Exiting the European Union; Attorney General for England and Wales; Secretary of State for Northern Ireland; The Lord Advocate (HM Advocate); Advocate General for Scotland; Counsel General for Wales; Attorney General for Northern Ireland

R (Miller) v Secretary of State for Exiting the European Union is a United Kingdom constitutional law case decided by the United Kingdom Supreme Court on 24 January 2017, which ruled that the British Government (the executive) could not initiate withdrawal from the European Union by formal notification to the Council of the European Union as prescribed by Article 50 of the Treaty on European Union without an Act of Parliament first being passed to give the government Parliament's permission to do so. Two days later, the government responded by bringing to Parliament the European Union (Notification of Withdrawal) Act 2017 for first reading in the House of Commons on 26 January 2017. The case is informally referred to as "the Miller case" or "Miller I" (to differentiate from Miller's later Brexit-related case against the Government, Miller II).

The Supreme Court's decision was given on appeal from the High Court's ruling that the Crown's foreign affairs prerogative, which is exercised by the government led by the Prime Minister, may not be used to nullify rights that Parliament has enacted through primary legislation. The case was seen as having constitutional significance in deciding the scope of the royal prerogative in foreign affairs. The Supreme Court also ruled that devolved legislatures in Scotland, Wales and Northern Ireland have no legal right to veto the act.

The government's appeal was against the High Court order dated 7 November 2016 that declared: "The Secretary of State does not have power under the Crown's prerogative to give notice pursuant to Article 50 of the Treaty on European Union for the United Kingdom to withdraw from the European Union." The Supreme Court heard the appeal from 5 December 2016 to 8 December 2016, and, by a majority of 8–3, upheld the High Court ruling, finding that authorisation by Parliament was required for the invocation of Article 50.

The case was intervened by the Lord Advocate and the Counsel General for Wales for the Scottish and Welsh governments (respectively as the Scottish and Welsh Ministers), and applicants for judicial review in Northern Ireland also had their three separate applications considered alongside this case, all of whom argued that the Scottish Parliament, the National Assembly for Wales and the Northern Ireland Assembly all had to consent to the invocation of Article 50. In each case this was unanimously rejected by the court.

== Facts ==
Following a referendum held on 23 June 2016, in which 51.9% of votes cast were in favour of leaving the EU, the UK government stated its intention to invoke Article 50 of the Treaty on European Union (the formal procedure for withdrawing) on 29 March 2017. On the Monday following the referendum, three academics (Nick Barber, Tom Hickman and Jeff King) published a blog which argued that an Act of Parliament would be necessary before the Government could give notice to leave the EU. A few days later David Pannick, Baron Pannick, a columnist for The Times, asked whether an Act of Parliament was needed before notification could lawfully be given of the UK's intention to leave, and cited the arguments of Barber, Hickman and King in agreeing with them that an Act of Parliament was required. The government argued that the use of prerogative powers to enact the referendum result was constitutionally proper and consistent with domestic law whereas the opposing view was that the exercise of prerogative powers would undermine the European Communities Act 1972 and would set aside rights previously established by Parliament.

=== Arguments ===
Any Member State may decide to withdraw from the Union in accordance with its own constitutional requirements.

— Article 50(1) of the Treaty on European Union (TEU), as amended (Treaty of Maastricht, as amended by the Treaty of Lisbon)

Gina Miller and other claimants had sought permission to bring an action in the High Court for judicial review on whether the UK government was entitled to notify an intention to leave the European Union under Article 50 of the Treaty on European Union (TEU), as amended (the Maastricht and Lisbon Treaties), without a vote or deliberative debate in Parliament.

David Davis, the Secretary of State for Exiting the European Union, argued that the possibility to trigger Article 50 was based on the royal prerogative and so any consultation of elected members of parliament was unnecessary. Miller contended that, if notification under Article 50 were to be invoked to leave the European Union, it would effectively nullify a series of Acts of Parliament. It was a constitutional principle that Acts of Parliament could not be changed without the consent of Parliament.

The Secretary of State did not contend that the Referendum Act 2015 supplied a statutory power for the Crown to give notice under Article 50. The Court observed that he was right not to do so, because any argument to that effect would have been untenable as a matter of statutory interpretation of the 2015 Act and stated:

... a referendum on any topic can only be advisory for the lawmakers in Parliament unless very clear language to the contrary is in the referendum legislation in question. No such language is used in the 2015 Referendum Act. Further, the 2015 Referendum Act was passed against a background including a clear briefing paper to parliamentarians explaining that the referendum would have advisory effect only.

— Miller and Santos v. Secretary of State [2016] EWHC 2768 (Admin), para. 105–6

== High Court judgment ==
=== Background ===
There was dispute over whether the decision to invoke Article 50 was the prerogative of the government, as the Cameron government argued, or whether it required parliamentary approval. Article 50 states that "Any Member State may decide to withdraw from the Union in accordance with its own constitutional requirements".

As Professor Kenneth Armstrong (Professor of EU law at Cambridge University) points out this is a decision solely for domestic law: whether constitutional requirements have been met is a matter solely for the domestic law of member states. The UK's constitutional requirements for the valid invocation of Article 50 was the entire basis of this litigation, even though this was undertaken without explicit reference to that phrase as in Art 50(1) in the judgments. As will be seen below, it was held that the UK constitutional requirements were that an Act of Parliament need be passed in order to bestow the power on the Secretary of State to invoke Article 50, as the European Communities Act 1972 had displaced the Royal prerogative to take the UK outside of the EU treaties.

The first of the parties to lodge a complaint in the proceedings against the government's intention to trigger Article 50 without a parliamentary vote was Deir Dos Santos, who launched his action four days after the referendum of 23 June. Miller's claim form was served on 29 July 2016. The law firm Mishcon de Reya announced that it had been retained by a group of clients to challenge the constitutionality of invoking Article 50 without Parliament debating it. In the proceedings, all parties accepted that withdrawal from the European Union would have profound consequences in terms of changing domestic law in each of the jurisdictions of the United Kingdom.

At the preliminary hearing on 19 July 2016, Sir Brian Leveson, President of the Queen's Bench Division, stated that the court gave leave to Dos Santos to stay his proceedings and join as an interested party in Miller's case, and others, such as a group of unnamed clients who were separately represented, would have the option to be interested parties in the claim or interveners. At the hearing, lawyers for the government confirmed that the government would not issue an Article 50 notification before the end of 2016. In the court proceedings, the government contended that it would be constitutionally impermissible for the court to make a declaration in terms that the government could not lawfully issue notification under Article 50 unless authorised by an Act of Parliament, and stated that the declaration now being opposed would trespass on proceedings in Parliament.

Questions were also raised over the impartiality of Lord Neuberger by Brexit MPs and The Daily Telegraph, as his wife had made a series of tweets criticising Brexit. These allegations were countered by his spokesman, who said that Neuberger's wife's personal views had no effect on Neuberger's ability to interpret the law.

=== Hearing ===
Judges hearing the case

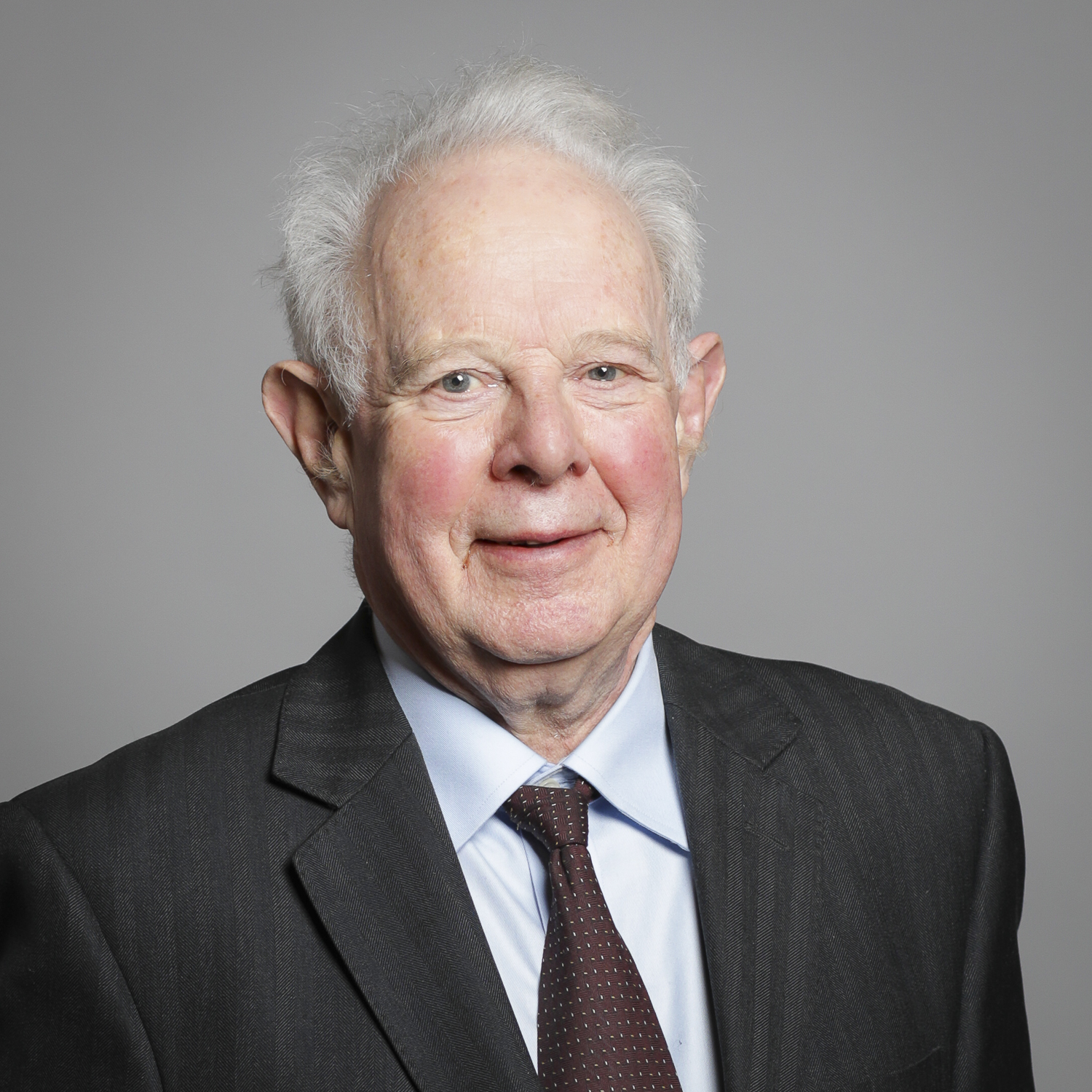
The Lord Thomas of Cwmgiedd
(Lord Chief Justice)

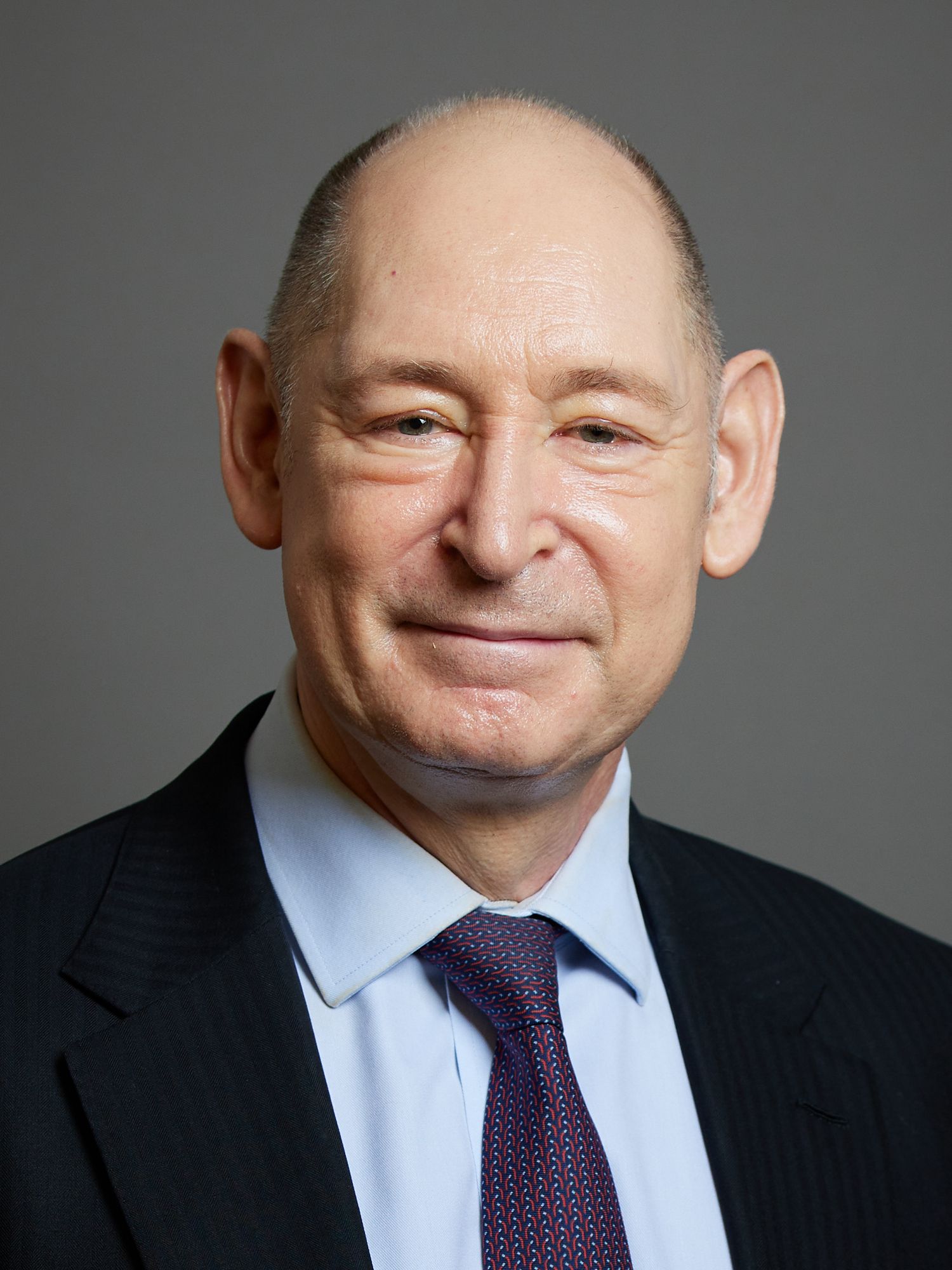
Sir Terence Etherton
(Master of the Rolls)

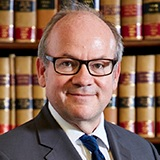
Sir Philip Sales
(Lord Justice of Appeal)

At the full hearing in October, before three judges sitting as a divisional court (the Lord Chief Justice, the Master of the Rolls and Lord Justice Sales), it was argued for the lead claimant (Miller) that notification under Article 50 would commit the UK to the removal of rights existing under the European Communities Act 1972 and later ratification acts, and that it is not open to the government, without Parliament's approval, to use the prerogative power to take action affecting rights which Parliament had recognised in that way. An argument put for the "expat" Interveners at the hearing was that by the 1972 Act, Parliament had conferred a legislative competence on the EU institutions, and in that way had changed the constitutional settlement in the UK.

Responding in the opening submissions for the government, the Attorney-General (Jeremy Wright) outlined how the decision had been reached. In support of the contention that when passing the 2015 Act Parliament well knew of the Article 50 procedure for leaving the European Union if that was voted for in the referendum, he said that Parliament had previously dealt with it when the Lisbon Treaty was included in domestic law by the 2008 Act, and he took the court through the legislation dealing with the European Union and its predecessor, namely:

- European Communities Act 1972 (before the Vienna Convention on the Law of Treaties came into force in 1980)
- European Assembly Elections Act 1978
- European Communities (Greek Accession) Act 1979
- European Assembly Elections Act 1981
- European Communities (Spanish and Portuguese Accession) Act 1985
- European Communities (Amendment) Act 1986
- European Communities (Amendment) Act 1993
- European Union (Accessions) Act 1994
- European Parliamentary Elections Act 2002
- European Union (Accessions) Act 2003
- European Union (Accessions) Act 2006
- European Union (Amendment) Act 2008
- Constitutional Reform and Governance Act 2010
- European Union Act 2011
- European Union (Croatian Accession and Irish Protocol) Act 2013
- European Union Referendum Act 2015.

In further submissions for the government, the lead claimant's primary argument was said by Treasury Counsel (James Eadie) to be that it is not open to the executive to use the prerogative power in such a way as to affect or change current economic law, principally statute law; but the government contended that the leading case Attorney General v De Keyser's Royal Hotel meant that the question about the use of the royal prerogative depended on Parliament's legislative intention. The treaty ratification provisions of the Constitutional Reform and Governance Act 2010 were in force from 11 November 2010, that is, after the Lisbon Treaty, including Article 50, was ratified for UK on 16 July 2008, and had come into force on 1 December 2009. While the Act describes "treaty" as an agreement between states, or between states and international organisations, which is binding under international law, including amendments to a treaty, and defines "ratification" as including acts (such as notification that domestic procedures have been completed) which establish as a matter of international law the United Kingdom's consent to be bound by the treaty, ratification of an amendment to a European Union treaty may involve compliance with the European Union (Amendment) Act 2008, and there are further provisions under the European Union Act 2011. The Lord Chief Justice described the statutory procedure as "of critical importance".

The hearing was concluded on 18 October, when the Lord Chief Justice said the judges would take time to consider the matter and give their judgments as quickly as possible.

In the meantime, the applications of other parties challenging the government in legal proceedings in Northern Ireland's High Court were dismissed on 28 October, but the court was prepared to grant leave to appeal in respect of four out of the five issues.

=== Judgment ===
The court's unanimous judgment was delivered and published on 3 November. The decision was against the government's contention that the Crown's prerogative allowed giving Article 50 notice, and the court would later decide on the form of declaration it would make. The court described the passing of the European Communities Act 1972 as the major step of "switching on the direct effect of EU law in the national legal systems", and reasoned that it is implausible that Parliament's intention was that the Crown should be able to switch it off unilaterally by exercise of its prerogative powers.

The judgment stated that the question for the court's decision involved the constitutional law of the United Kingdom: it was whether the Crown's executive government is entitled to use the Crown's prerogative powers to give notice under Article 50 for the United Kingdom to cease to be a member of the European Union. The court held that the Government had no power to trigger notification under article 50 of the Treaty on European Union (TEU), because it would remove a series of rights created by Acts of Parliament. The principle of parliamentary sovereignty required that only Parliament could take away those rights. This is expressed in the Case of Proclamations (1608), the Bill of Rights 1688 section 1, and continually confirmed since in cases including Burmah Oil Co Ltd v Lord Advocate, and R (Jackson) v Attorney General. The Crown may not alter the domestic law of the UK or modify rights conferred by Parliament.

Three categories of rights were

(i) rights that could be replicated by British law (e.g. 28 days' paid holidays under the Working Time Directive 2003),
(ii) rights of British citizens in other EU member states (e.g. the right to work abroad, or set up a business, under TFEU articles 45 and 49) and
(iii) rights that could not be replicated in British law (e.g. the right to vote in the EU Parliament or petition the EU Commission to enforce competition law or environmental law standards in the UK).

While the Secretary of State accepted that category (iii) rights would be nullified, the High Court also ruled that all rights in categories (i) and (ii) would also be jeopardised in their effectiveness.

The case had come before the court as a "rolled up" hearing, so that both the application for permission to seek judicial review and the substantive merits of the claim were considered at the hearing. Formally, this meant that permission for full judicial review on the substantive merits was granted.

The High Court order dated 7 November 2016 declared: "The Secretary of State does not have power under the Crown's prerogative to give notice pursuant to Article 50 of the Treaty on European Union for the United Kingdom to withdraw from the European Union."

=== Press reaction ===
The front pages of (clockwise from top-right) The Sun, The Daily Telegraph, the Daily Express and the Daily Mail on 4 November 2016, the day after the High Court decision

The High Court decision was met with mixed views in the daily press. The Daily Telegraph commented that the High Court ruling increased the prospect of an early general election, while the Financial Times and The Guardian reported the case as a "blow" or a "setback" to the British government plans. The financial markets reacted by an increasing exchange rate for the pound sterling against the euro and the dollar, on speculation of a delayed or softer Brexit.

Other news media attacked the presiding judges and questioned their impartiality, the Daily Mail calling them "enemies of the people", and on its website describing one judge as "an openly gay ex-Olympic fencer". The Guardian reported that MPs condemned newspaper attacks on the judges after their Brexit ruling.

Shadow Justice Secretary Richard Burgon condemned personal attacks from newspapers on the judges, describing them as "hysterical", and called on Lord Chancellor Liz Truss to speak out and protect them. Former Attorney General Dominic Grieve described the attacks as "entirely unjustified", and said that "[t]here seems to be a paranoid hysteria around that this is being done [to reverse] the referendum. But it's simply that there has to be a process followed if parliament is to give effect to and express the wish of the electorate." Brendan Cox, widower of Jo Cox, also expressed concern. The General Council of the Bar also called on Truss to condemn the attacks.

The oath of office (prescribed by the Constitutional Reform Act 2005) obliges a Lord Chancellor to respect the rule of law and defend the independence of the judiciary. On 5 November 2016, Truss issued a statement in which she said: "The independence of the judiciary is the foundation upon which our rule of law is built and our judiciary is rightly respected the world over for its independence and impartiality." Her statement was in turn criticised as belated and inadequate. The oath of office for judges obliges them to "well and truly serve" the Queen and "do right to all manner of people after the laws and usages" of the realm "without fear or favour, affection or ill will".

The Telegraph, in an editorial on 5 December 2016, expressed its regret that the High Court had heard the application at all, "instead of deciding that it was not the business of the judiciary to get involved in what is essentially a political matter" and its concern that "by upholding the lower court's ruling, the Supreme Court justices could find themselves dictating to Parliament – an inversion of the normal constitutional order, with potential consequences for the notion that Parliament is sovereign and thus supreme". The Guardian commented on 5 December 2016 that the unprecedented number of the panel of eleven justices who would be hearing the appeal and deciding the case was recognition of the constitutional significance and political sensitivity of the appeal.

== Appeal to the Supreme Court ==
The case, involving the government's appeal from the High Court of England and Wales and two references from Northern Ireland, was the first ever to be heard en banc by the full court (eleven justices, there being one vacancy). The Court scheduled the four days between 5 and 8 December 2016 for the hearing. Judgment was delivered on 24 January 2017. By a majority of the justices, the Supreme Court, with three dissenting, dismissed the government's appeal from the High Court, finding that an Act of Parliament was required to invoke Article 50.

=== In advance of appeal hearing ===
For the Scottish government, Scotland's First Minister, Nicola Sturgeon, told the Lord Advocate to apply to join the case. Sturgeon maintained it "simply cannot be right" for EU rights to be "removed by the UK Government on the say-so of a Prime Minister without parliamentary debate, scrutiny or consent". She argued further that "legislation should be required at Westminster and the consent of the Scottish Parliament should be sought before Article 50 is triggered". On 18 November the Supreme Court announced that the Attorney General for Northern Ireland had made a reference to the court regarding devolution issues relating to that jurisdiction and that the court had granted the applications of four interveners to take part in the appeal, namely:

- The Lord Advocate (James Wolffe), Scottish Government
- The Counsel General for Wales (Mick Antoniw), Welsh Government
- The "Expat Interveners" – George Birnie and others
- The Independent Workers' Union of Great Britain.

The BBC reported that the Lord Advocate would be addressing the court on Scots law, and the Welsh Counsel General's submissions would be addressing the court on the rule of law and parliamentary sovereignty.

Speaking on 9 November, Lady Hale, deputy president of the Supreme Court, stated that the issue in the case to be heard on appeal by the Court in December was whether giving Article 50 notification was within the Crown's prerogative powers for the conduct of foreign relations or whether the prerogative cannot be used in a way that undermines an act of the United Kingdom Parliament.

In the appeal the government argued that, while Parliament's enactment of the European Communities Act 1972 was necessary to prevent the UK breaching the EEC treaties when they came into force on 1 January 1973, the 1972 act was a legal precondition neither for the signature nor for the ratification of the Treaty of Accession, nor for the treaty coming into force in respect of the UK.

Intervening for the Scottish government, the Lord Advocate stated as background that the UK "acceded to the constitutional order of the Communities" when joining on 1 January 1973 and argued that "[t]he purported giving of notification under Article 50 TEU by unilateral act of [the British government] would be unlawful" because it would (inter alia)

- be contrary to provisions of the Acts of Union of 1706 and 1708; and
- circumvent the requirements of established constitutional convention.

Before the hearing, the Supreme Court invited the public to view video footage of the entire proceedings, and provided on its website a page headed "Article 50 'Brexit' Appeal" with multiple links, giving a brief explanation of the issues to be considered and other information, and stating that in addition to live video feeds and 'on demand' catch-up video of each court session, transcripts would be available at the website on a half-daily basis (morning session by 4 pm, afternoon session around 7 pm).

The government's written case, prepared in advance of the hearing of the appeal, and subscribed by the Attorney General for England and Wales and the Advocate General for Scotland, included footnotes referring to legal comment, critical of the High Court's judgment, on pages of UK Constitutional Law Association and two other websites:

- footnotes 7 p. 22 and 10, p. 24: John Finnis, Terminating Treaty-based UK Rights, 26 October 2016; and Terminating Treaty-based UK Rights: A Supplementary Note, 2 November 2016.
- footnote 11, p. 25: Adam Tomkins, Brexit, Democracy and the Rule of Law, republished 6 November 2016 at Verfassungsblog.
- footnote 13, p. 26: M. Elliott and H. J. Hooper, Critical reflections on the High Court's judgment, 7 November 2016.
- footnote 14, p. 27: David Feldman, Brexit, the Royal Prerogative, and Parliamentary Sovereignty, 8 November 2016.
- footnote 21, p. 39: John Finnis, 'Intent of Parliament' unsoundly Constructed, Judicial Power Project Blog, 4 November 2016.

The Daily Telegraph commented that ministers had accused the judges of relegating the referendum vote to a footnote, and backing the claim that a vote from the House of Commons and House of Lords was now needed before UK and EU talks began. An opinion stated in a BBC News website article (3 December 2016) was that there was little expectation of the High Court's ruling being reversed by the Supreme Court. Another BBC webpage summed up the Scottish government's contention, against the British government's appeal, as arguing that the triggering of Article 50 will affect Scotland in a way that requires the involvement of the Scottish Parliament in the process.

=== Appeal and references heard together ===
The Supreme Court listed the appeal as R (on the application of Miller and Dos Santos) (Respondents) v Secretary of State for Exiting the European Union (Appellant) to be heard together with Reference by the Attorney General for Northern Ireland – In the matter of an application by Agnew and others for Judicial Review (Northern Ireland) and Reference by the Court of Appeal (Northern Ireland) – In the matter of an application by Raymond McCord for Judicial Review (Northern Ireland). The daily sessions of the hearing began on Monday 5 December.

In the British government's appeal from the High Court, the British law officers and others, acting for the Secretary of State as the appellant, were instructed by the Government Legal Department; and the two respondents, Miller and Dos Santos, were represented by barristers and solicitors acting for them separately. Others listed as participating in the hearing were:

- Attorney General for Northern Ireland
- lawyers acting in NI Reference (Agnew and others)
- lawyers acting in NI Reference (SoS Northern Ireland) instructed by Crown Solicitor's Office
- lawyers acting in NI Reference (McCord)
- 1st interested party, Pigney and others
- 2nd Interested Party, AB and others
- 1st Intervener, Birnie and others
- 2nd Intervener, Lord Advocate instructed by Scottish Government Legal Directorate
- 3rd Intervener, Counsel General of Wales Instructed by Welsh Government Legal Services Department
- 4th Intervener, TWGB (written submissions only)
- 5th Intervener, Lawyers of Britain (written submissions only).

The Court published a table setting out the time allotted for the hearing of the oral arguments of the parties' advocates in the four days, Monday 5 to Thursday 8 December:

- First day, and morning of second day: for the Appellant (Attorney-General, Jeremy Wright; Treasury Counsel, James Eadie; Advocate General for Scotland, Lord Keen of Elie),
- Second day, afternoon: for the NI Attorney General (on reference from NI High Court), followed by for Respondent Miller.
- Third day: for Respondent Miller (continued), followed by for Respondent Dos Santos, followed by for Applicants Agnew and McCord, followed by for the Scottish government.
- Fourth day: for the Scottish government (continued), followed by for the Welsh government, followed by for Interested Parties Grahame Pigney and others, followed by for Interested Parties AB, KK, PR and children, followed by for George Birnie and others, followed by for the Appellant in reply.

=== The hearing ===
Before calling on the Attorney General to open the case for the government as Appellant, the Supreme Court President stated the justices were aware of the strong feelings associated with the many wider political questions surrounding the United Kingdom's departure from the European Union, but the appeal was concerned with the legal issues, and their duty was to consider those issues impartially and decide according to the law. He mentioned that all the parties involved in the proceedings had been asked whether they wished any of the justices to stand down, and each of them had stated that they had no objection to any of the eleven sitting on the appeal.

At the start of the government's oral submissions, the Attorney-General said the claimants had brought High Court proceedings perfectly properly and it was now perfectly proper for the Supreme Court to decide the appeal. The Appellant's submissions, apart from devolution issues to be addressed later by the Advocate General for Scotland, were summed up on the morning of the second day in a series of points:

- As Parliament knows today and knew in 1972, the Crown prerogative to make and unmake or withdraw from treaties exists as a key part of the British constitution.
- Parliament has deliberately regulated some parts of those prerogative powers, expressly and in detail, but it has not touched the power to give Article 50 notice.
- There is no basis for imposing a hidden legislative presumption on Parliament's intention: the rights in question in this case are created on the international plane, and then recognised by British law; EU rights on that plane are altered and removed through the Crown's prerogative powers, and that is a "significant step along the road to finding the intention in relation to withdrawal".
- The courts should be wary of going over the line between interpretation of legislation and judicial legislation, in a way which would impose "a new control of a most serious kind in a highly controversial and, by Parliament, carefully considered area".
- The 2015 Act and the referendum emphatically undermine a suggestion that giving Article 50 notice by use of the prerogative power could be other than consistent with the will of Parliament.

Following on, the Advocate General for Scotland ended his oral submissions for the Appellant by saying that if an exercise of the royal prerogative to take the UK out of the EU were seen as an abuse of power after the 1972 Act, there could be no such abuse after the Referendum Act 2015 and the result of the referendum was known: "It is simply a question of whether it would be proper and appropriate for the executive to exercise the prerogative in particular circumstances, and the circumstances that we have to address are those which exist today in light of the 2015 Act, which is of considerable constitutional importance and the decision made in the referendum, knowing that if Parliament wanted to intervene and limit the exercise of that prerogative right, it is free to do so and has chosen to remain silent."

For the Respondent Miller it was argued that the Court should not accept that the legal limits on ministers' powers are to be left to or influenced by political control, or parliamentary control, short of an act of Parliament. For the Respondent Dos Santos it was submitted that the legislature could easily have said what effect the 2015 referendum was if it wanted to tell us, but it has not told us, and the courts should not try and guess what the legislature intended, but instead leave it to the legislature to decide; and that, as there is no parliamentary authorisation for the loss of rights resulting from withdrawal from the EU, whether under the 2015 Act, or any other legislation which has been passed by Parliament, the government's appeal should be dismissed. The Welsh Government submitted that the British Government's proposed Article 50 notification would be an unlawful dispensation by the Crown of the provisions establishing the competence of the Welsh Assembly.

In response to submissions of parties opposing the appeal and questions put by the Justices, it was said for the government that the question before the court was about "the present state of the division of responsibility between our pillars of state, legislative, executive, and indeed judicial, and that demands a current answer and not a historic one"; and that parliament's legislation was to implement British treaty obligations, not to control the government's exercise of the royal prerogative on the international plane.

Closing the hearing, the Court President said that the appeal raised important constitutional issues, and the Justices would take time to give full consideration to the many arguments presented to them, orally and in writing, and they would do their best to resolve the case as quickly as possible.

=== Judgment ===
The Supreme Court held by eight judges to three that only Parliament could authorise a notification under TEU Article 50 to be given to the European Commission, upholding the decision of the High Court. However, all judges found unanimously that neither the Sewel Convention, nor the Northern Ireland Act 1998 and the Good Friday Agreement, legally required the consent of the Scottish Parliament, the National Assembly for Wales or the Northern Ireland Assembly to trigger article 50. (Note: This rejected the arguments of the Lord Advocate (also known in the Scottish courts as Her Majesty's Advocate or HM Advocate, for the Scottish Government, as the Scottish Ministers), the Counsel General for Wales (for the Welsh Government, as the Welsh Ministers) and the Northern Ireland applicants for judicial review (in Northern Ireland) (Agnew and others (Stephen Agnew, Colum Eastwood, David Ford, John O'Dowd, Dessie Donnelly, Dawn Purvis, Monica Wilson, The Committee on the Administration of Justice, The Human Rights Consortium), and Raymond McCord.)

The majority judgment said the following.

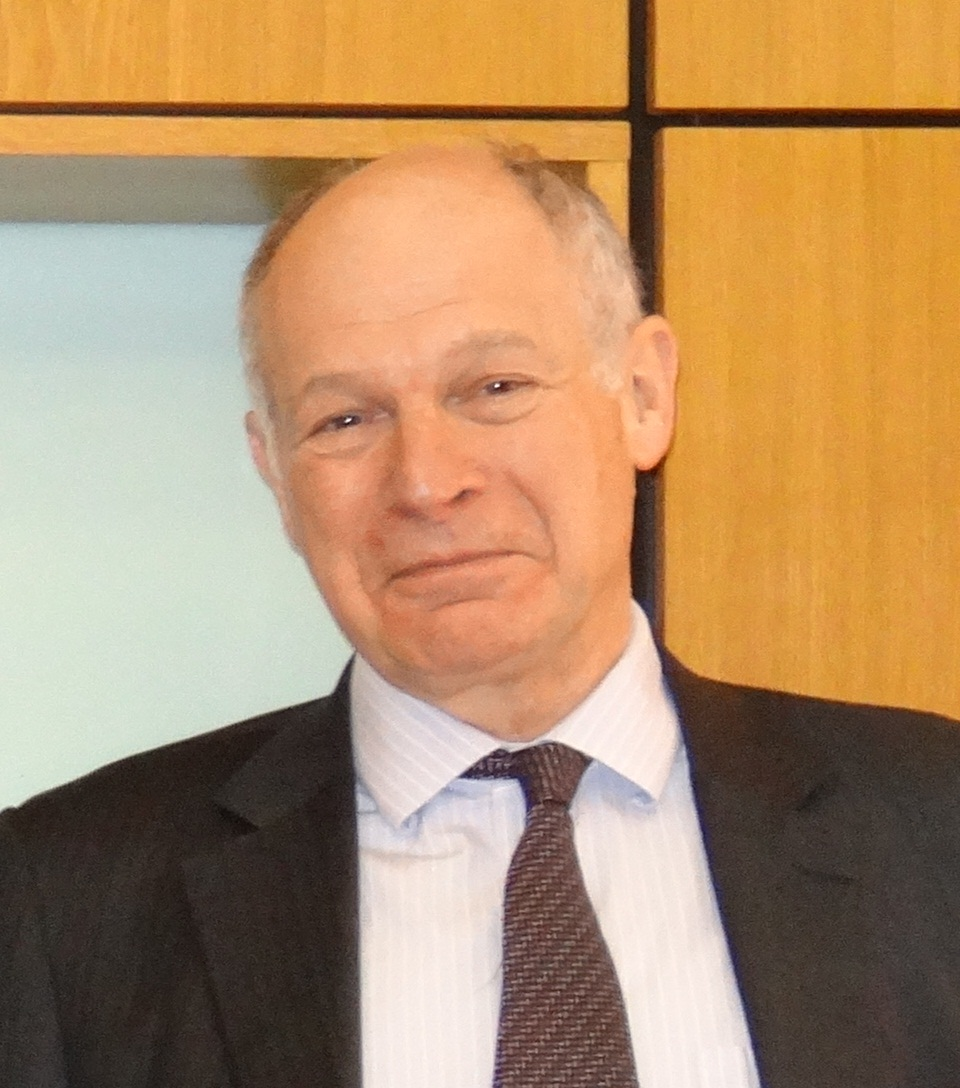
Lord Neuberger, President of the Supreme Court, delivered the majority judgment for Lady Hale, Lord Mance, Lord Kerr, Lord Clarke, Lord Wilson, Lord Sumption and Lord Hodge. Lord Reed, Lord Carnwath and Lord Hughes dissented.

51. ... ministers cannot frustrate the purpose of a statute or a statutory provision, for example by emptying it of content or preventing its effectual operation. Thus, ministers could not exercise prerogative powers at the international level to revoke the designation of Laker Airways under an aviation treaty as that would have rendered a licence granted under a statute useless: Laker Airways Ltd v Department of Trade [1977] QB 643 - see especially at pp 718-719 and 728 per Roskill LJ and Lawton LJ respectively. And in Fire Brigades Union cited above, at pp 551-552, Lord Browne-Wilkinson concluded that ministers could not exercise the prerogative power to set up a scheme of compensation for criminal injuries in such a way as to make a statutory scheme redundant, even though the statute in question was not yet in force. And, as already mentioned in para 35 above, he also stated that it was inappropriate for ministers to base their actions (or to invite the court to make any decision) on the basis of an anticipated repeal of a statutory provision as that would involve ministers (or the court) pre-empting Parliament’s decision whether to enact that repeal.

86. .. the EU Treaties not only concern the international relations of the United Kingdom, they are a source of domestic law, and they are a source of domestic legal rights many of which are inextricably linked with domestic law from other sources. Accordingly, the Royal prerogative to make and unmake treaties, which operates wholly on the international plane, cannot be exercised in relation to the EU Treaties, at least in the absence of domestic sanction in appropriate statutory form. It follows that, rather than the Secretary of State being able to rely on the absence in the 1972 Act of any exclusion of the prerogative power to withdraw from the EU Treaties, the proper analysis is that, unless that Act positively created such a power in relation to those Treaties, it does not exist. And, once one rejects the contention that section 2 accommodates a ministerial power to withdraw from the EU Treaties (as to which see paras 79 and 84 above), it is plain that the 1972 Act did not create such a power of withdrawal, as the Secretary of State properly accepts.

87. We accept, of course, that it would have been open to Parliament to provide expressly that the constitutional arrangements and the EU rights introduced by the 1972 Act should themselves only prevail from time to time and for so long as the UK government did not decide otherwise, and in particular did not decide to withdraw from the EU Treaties. But we cannot accept that the 1972 Act did so provide. As Lord Hoffmann explained in R v Secretary of State for the Home Department, Ex p Simms [2000] 2 AC 115, 131, "the principle of legality means that Parliament must squarely confront what it is doing and accept the political cost", and so "[f]undamental rights cannot be overridden by general … words" in a statute, "because there is too great a risk that the full implications of their unqualified meaning may have passed unnoticed in the democratic process". Had the Bill which became the 1972 Act spelled out that ministers would be free to withdraw the United Kingdom from the EU Treaties, the implications of what Parliament was being asked to endorse would have been clear, and the courts would have so decided. But we must take the legislation as it is, and we cannot accept that, in Part I of the 1972 Act, Parliament "squarely confront[ed]" the notion that it was clothing ministers with the far-reaching and anomalous right to use a treaty-making power to remove an important source of domestic law and important domestic rights.

[...]

89. For these reasons, we disagree with Lloyd LJ’s conclusion in Rees-Mogg in so far as he held that ministers could exercise prerogative powers to withdraw from the EU Treaties....

90. The EU Treaties as implemented pursuant to the 1972 Act were and are unique in their legislative and constitutional implications. In 1972, for the first time in the history of the United Kingdom, a dynamic, international source of law was grafted onto, and above, the well-established existing sources of domestic law: Parliament and the courts. And, as explained in paras 13–15 above, before (i) signing and (ii) ratifying the 1972 Accession Treaty, ministers, acting internationally, waited for Parliament, acting domestically, (i) to give clear, if not legally binding, approval in the form of resolutions, and (ii) to enable the Treaty to be effective by passing the 1972 Act. Bearing in mind this unique history and the constitutional principle of Parliamentary sovereignty, it seems most improbable that those two parties had the intention or expectation that ministers, constitutionally the junior partner in that exercise, could subsequently remove the graft without formal appropriate sanction from the constitutionally senior partner in that exercise, Parliament.

[...]

121. Where, as in this case, implementation of a referendum result requires a change in the law of the land, and statute has not provided for that change, the change in the law must be made in the only way in which the UK constitution permits, namely through Parliamentary legislation.

122. What form such legislation should take is entirely a matter for Parliament. But, in the light of a point made in oral argument, it is right to add that the fact that Parliament may decide to content itself with a very brief statute is nothing to the point. There is no equivalence between the constitutional importance of a statute, or any other document, and its length or complexity. A notice under article 50(2) could no doubt be very short indeed, but that would not undermine its momentous significance. The essential point is that, if, as we consider, what would otherwise be a prerogative act would result in a change in domestic law, the act can only lawfully be carried out with the sanction of primary legislation enacted by the Queen in Parliament.

== Summary of judgments ==
Court	Judge	UK Parliament?	Devolved Parliaments?	Date
Queen's Bench (England) (Wales)	The Lord Thomas of Cwmgiedd (LCJ)	Required	Not required	3 November
Queen's Bench (England) (Wales)	Sir Terence Etherton (MR)	Required	Not required	3 November
Queen's Bench (England) (Wales)	Lord Justice Sales	Required	Not required	3 November
Supreme (United Kingdom)	The Lord Neuberger of Abbotsbury (P)	Required	Not required	24 January
Supreme (United Kingdom)	The Baroness Hale of Richmond (DP)	Required	Not required	24 January
Supreme (United Kingdom)	The Lord Mance	Required	Not required	24 January
Supreme (United Kingdom)	The Lord Kerr of Tonaghmore	Required	Not required	24 January
Supreme (United Kingdom)	The Lord Clarke of Stone-cum-Ebony	Required	Not required	24 January
Supreme (United Kingdom)	Lord Wilson of Culworth	Required	Not required	24 January
Supreme (United Kingdom)	Lord Sumption	Required	Not required	24 January
Supreme (United Kingdom)	Lord Hodge	Required	Not required	24 January
Supreme (United Kingdom)	Lord Reed	Not required	Not required	24 January
Supreme (United Kingdom)	Lord Carnwath of Notting Hill	Not required	Not required	24 January
Supreme (United Kingdom)	Lord Hughes of Ombersley	Not required	Not required	24 January

== Significance ==
After the government's appeal was dismissed, the Secretary of State for Exiting the EU formally introduced in Parliament, on 26 January 2017, a bill that, on 16 March, was enacted without amendment as the European Union (Notification of Withdrawal) Act 2017. The act's long title is To Confer power on the Prime Minister to notify, under Article 50(2) of the Treaty on European Union, the United Kingdom's intention to withdraw from the EU. The act's two sections are to confer on the Prime Minister the power of giving the notice that the Treaty requires to be given when a member state decides to withdraw.

== See also ==
- R (Wilson) v Prime Minister [2018] EWHC 3520 (Admin)
- United Kingdom constitutional law
