= Trevor Allan =

Trevor Allan may refer to:

- Trevor Allan (rugby) (1926–2007), Australian rugby union and rugby league player
- Trevor Allan (legal philosopher) (born 1955), British law professor
- Trevor Allan (tennis) (born 1955), Australian tennis player
