= Parliamentary sovereignty in the United Kingdom =

Constitutional principle of the United Kingdom

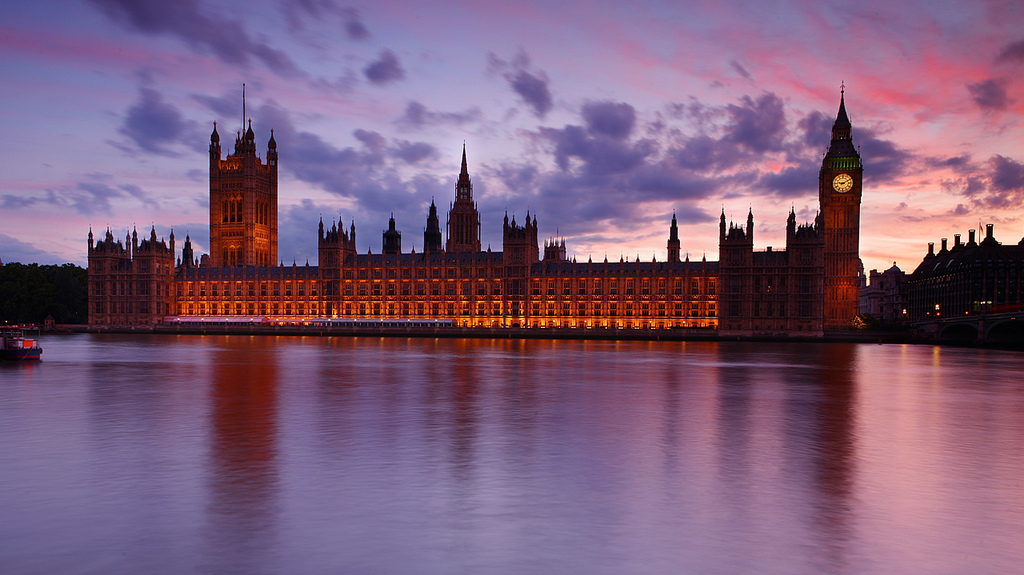
Under section 38 of the European Union (Withdrawal Agreement) Act 2020 "It is recognised that the Parliament of the United Kingdom is sovereign".

Parliamentary sovereignty is a longstanding concept central to the functioning of the constitution of the United Kingdom, but which is also not fully defined and has long been debated. Since the subordination of the monarchy under parliament, and the increasingly democratic methods of parliamentary government, there have been the questions of whether parliament holds a supreme ability to legislate and whether or not it should.

Parliamentary sovereignty is a description of the extent to which the Parliament of the United Kingdom has absolute and unlimited power. It is framed in terms of the extent of authority that parliament holds, and whether there are any sorts of law that it cannot pass. In other countries, a written constitution often binds the parliament to act in a certain way, but there is no codified constitution in the United Kingdom. In the United Kingdom, parliament is central to the institutions of state. The concept is exclusive to the UK Parliament and therefore does not extend to the Scottish Parliament, the Senedd and the Northern Ireland Assembly.

The traditional view put forward by A. V. Dicey is that parliament had the power to make any law except any law that bound its successors. Formally speaking however, the present state that is the UK is descended from the international Treaty of Union between England and Scotland in 1706/7 which led to the creation of the "Kingdom of Great Britain". It is clear that the terms of that Treaty stated that certain of its provisions could not be altered, for example the separate existence of the Scottish legal system, and formally, these restrictions are a continuing limitation on the sovereignty of the UK Parliament. This has also been reconsidered by constitutional theorists including Sir William Wade and Trevor Allan in light of the European Communities Act 1972 and other provisions relating to membership of the European Union, and the position of the Human Rights Act 1998 and any attempts to make this or other legislation entrenched. These issues remain contested, although the United Kingdom has since ceased membership of the European Union and is no longer subject to its treaties.

The terms "parliamentary sovereignty" and "parliamentary supremacy" are often used interchangeably. The term "sovereignty" implies a similarity to the question of national sovereignty. While writer John Austin and others have looked to combine parliamentary and national sovereignty, this view is not universally held. Whichever term is used, it relates to the existence or non-existence of limits on parliament's power in its legislative role. Although the House of Commons' dominance over the other two components of Parliament (the King and the House of Lords) is well attested, "parliamentary sovereignty" refers to their joint power. All legislation receives royal assent from the King, and almost all is passed with the support of the House of Lords.

== History ==
The Statute of Proclamations of 1539 gave the king wide powers to legislate without reference to, or approval from, Parliament. At the same time, it recognised the common law, existing statutory provisions, and excluded the breach of royal proclamations from the death penalty. It was repealed in 1547, but Queen Mary and Queen Elizabeth both relied on royal proclamations. A review by Chief Justice Edward Coke in 1610, the Case of Proclamations, established that Parliament had the sole right to legislate, but the Crown could enforce it. The concept of parliamentary sovereignty was central to the English Civil War: Royalists argued that power was held by the king, and delegated to Parliament, a view which was challenged by the Parliamentarians. The issue of taxation was a significant power struggle between Parliament and the king during the Stuart period. If Parliament had the ability to withhold funds from the monarch, then it could prevail. Direct taxation had been a matter for Parliament from the reign of Edward I, but indirect taxation continued to be a matter for the king.

Royal powers were finally removed by the Bill of Rights 1689. The Bill of Rights also removed the ability of the Crown to dispense with (ignore or suspend) legislation and statutes. Such a right had culminated in James II's Declaration of Indulgence of 1687, which had ushered in the Glorious Revolution. That led the Earl of Shaftesbury to declare in 1689, "The Parliament of England is that supreme and absolute power, which gives life and motion to the English government". The Act of Settlement of 1700 removed royal power over the judiciary and defined a vote of both houses as the sole method of removing a judge.

== Core theory ==
It was the view of A. V. Dicey, writing in the early twentieth century, that Parliament had "the right to make or unmake any law whatever; and, further, that no person or body is recognised by the law of England as having a right to override or set aside the legislation of Parliament". He refers to "England" but his view held for the other nations of the United Kingdom, with slightly different details. This view however side-steps the issue of the limitations formally placed on Parliament when the United Kingdom was first established in 1706/7 and the English and Scottish Parliaments surrendered, or perhaps more correctly pooled, their sovereignty into the new state.

There are at least three suggested sources for this sovereignty. The first is sovereignty by Act of Parliament itself. One response, put forward by John Salmond was to reject this idea: he believed that "no statute can confer this power on Parliament for this would be to assume and act on the very power that is to be conferred". An alternative is to see sovereignty conferred by way of the repeated and unchallenged use of sovereignty through the promulgation of laws by Parliament. The second possible source are the courts, that in enforcing all Acts of Parliament without exception, they have conferred sovereignty upon Parliament. The third alternative is the complex relationship between all parts of government, and their historical development. This is then assumed to be continuous and the basis for the future. However, if sovereignty was built up over time, "freezing" it at the current time seems to run contrary to that.

A group of individuals cannot hold sovereignty, only the institution of Parliament; determining what does and does not constitute an Act of Parliament is important. This is considered a "manner and form" requirement. In the absence of a written constitution, it is a matter for the common law to make this determination. The court does not consider any procedural defects of the bill if they are present; this is called the "enrolled Act" doctrine. For example, the case of Pickin v British Railways Board was dismissed because it relied on the standing order process not having been fulfilled.

However, the status of the Regency Acts is not so clear. In them, a regent acting during the infancy, incapacitation or absence of the monarch can assent to bills but cannot do so if they relate to changing the nature of monarchical inheritance or amending the Protestant Religion and Presbyterian Church Act 1707, which protected that church in Scotland. If a regent did assent to a bill of these kinds, it may not be held to be a valid law even if it gained the approval of both houses and royal assent.

Parliament may also make changes which impact successor parliaments as to their method of election and their constituent parts. For example, the Reform Act 1832 radically altered the distribution of MPs and subsequent parliaments followed the new rules. However, it remains open to any successor to legislate again to change these requirements, protecting its sovereignty. Similarly, only a reconstituted House of Lords could pass a bill reversing the changes of the House of Lords Act 1999 if its consent were required (unless the Parliament Acts were used). However, the whole system of government could be abolished, and the next parliament would not be bound if it were not considered a successor.

== Membership of the European Union (1973–2020) ==
From 1 January 1973 to 31 January 2020, the United Kingdom was a member state of the European Union and its predecessor the three European Communities which was made up principally of the European Economic Community (EEC) which was widely known at the time as the "Common Market", the European Coal and Steel Community (ECSC) which became defunct in 2002 and the European Atomic Energy Community (EAEC or Euratom) which the UK also withdrew from in 2020.

The European Communities Act 1972 gave European Union law (previously Community law) the force of law in the United Kingdom and it also incorporated the obligations of the European Treaties into UK domestic law as well. Section 2(1) reads:

2. General implementation of Treaties

(1) All such rights, powers, liabilities, obligations and restrictions from time to time created or arising by or under the Treaties, and all such remedies and procedures from time to time provided for by or under the Treaties, as in accordance with the Treaties are without further enactment to be given legal effect or used in the United Kingdom shall be recognised and available in law, and be enforced, allowed and followed accordingly ; and the expression "enforceable Community right" and similar expressions shall be read as referring to one to which this subsection applies.

Although not stated specifically (or even directly acknowledged by politicians) in the 1972 Act the principle of EU Law (previously Community Law) having primacy over the domestic laws of the member states also applied to the United Kingdom.

In the run-up to the 1975 United Kingdom European Communities membership referendum the then Labour government led by the then Prime Minister Harold Wilson distributed a pamphlet on behalf of HM Government to every household in Britain and in the pamphlet contained the governments assessment on Parliament's future role on continued membership.

Fact No 3: The British Parliament in Westminister retains the final right to repeal the Act that took us into the Common Market on 1 January 1973. Thus our continued membership will depend on the continuing assent of Parliament

A few days following the outcome of the referendum in which the United Kingdom had confirmed its continued membership "Yes" of the communities in an interview for the Daily Telegraph the then Ulster Unionist (UUP) MP for South Down Enoch Powell confirmed this assessment within the pamphlet on Parliament's role in the future of British EC membership:

Never again by the necessity of an axiom, will an Englishman live for his country or die for his country: The country for which people live and die was obsolete and we have abolished it. Or not quite yet. No, not yet. The referendum is not a 'verdict' after which the prisoner is hanged forthwith. It is no more than provisional: ... This will be so as long Parliament can alter or undo whatever that or any other Parliament has done. Hence those Golden words in the Government's Referendum pamphlet: 'Our continued membership would depend on the continuing assent of Parliament'.

The case of R v. Secretary of State for Transport ex parte Factortame is considered decisive as to the superiority of EU law over British law. It judged that the Merchant Shipping Act 1988 and section 21 of the Crown Proceedings Act 1947 (which prevented an injunction against the Crown) should be disapplied. Alongside R v Employment Secretary, ex parte EOC, these two cases establish that any national legislation, coming into force before or after the European Communities Act 1972, cannot be applied by British courts if it contradicts Community law.

The Factortame case was considered to be revolutionary by Sir William Wade, who cited in particular Lord Bridge's statement that "there is nothing in any way novel in according supremacy to rules of Community law in areas to which they apply and to insist that... national courts must not be prohibited by rules of national law from granting interim relief in appropriate cases is no more than a logical recognition of that supremacy", which Wade characterises a clear statement that parliament can bind its successors and is therefore a very significant break from traditional thinking. Trevor Allan, argued, however, that the change in rule was accepted by the existing order because of strong legal reasons. Since legal reasons existed, the House of Lords had, instead, determined what the current system suggested under new circumstances and so no revolution had occurred.

Section 18 of the European Union Act 2011 declared that EU law is directly applicable only through the European Communities Act or another act fulfilling the same role.

18. Status of EU law dependent on continuing statutory basis

Directly applicable or directly effective EU law (that is, the rights, powers, liabilities, obligations, restrictions, remedies and procedures referred to in section 2(1) of the European Communities Act 1972) falls to be recognised and available in law in the United Kingdom only by virtue of that Act or where it is required to be recognised and available in law by virtue of any other Act.

Parliament legislated in 2018 to repeal the 1972 Act, and in 2020 the United Kingdom ceased to be a member of the EU in accordance with and by virtue of that Act (albeit amended by further legislation of Parliament), demonstrating both that the previous Parliament (of 1972) had not bound its successor with respect to leaving the EU and also confirmed following the Parliamentary deadlock and the outcome of the 2019 general election the late Harold Wilson's government view and Enoch Powell's endorsement that the United Kingdom's membership of the EU was dependent on the continuing assent of Parliament.

All provisions of the 1972 Act were repealed on 31 January 2020 at 2300 GMT although an amendment in the European Union (Withdrawal Agreement) Act 2020 saved the effect of the 1972 Act until the end of the implementation period which came to an end on 31 December 2020 at 2300 GMT.

In 2020, Parliament ratified the Brexit withdrawal agreement and incorporated it into UK law through the European Union (Withdrawal Agreement) Act 2020. Section 18 of the 2011 Act was replaced with section 38 of the 2020 Act, which declares:

38. Parliamentary Sovereignty

(1) It is recognised that the Parliament of the United Kingdom is sovereign.

(2) In particular, its sovereignty subsists notwithstanding—

(a) directly applicable or directly effective EU law continuing to be recognised and available in domestic law by virtue of section 1A or 1B of the European Union (Withdrawal) Act 2018 (savings of existing law for the implementation period),

(b) section 7A of that Act (other directly applicable or directly effective aspects of the withdrawal agreement),

(c) section 7B of that Act (deemed direct applicability or direct effect in relation to the EEA EFTA separation agreement and the Swiss citizens' rights agreement), and

(d) section 7C of that Act (interpretation of law relating to the withdrawal agreement (other than the implementation period), the EEA EFTA separation agreement and the Swiss citizens' rights agreement).

(3) Accordingly, nothing in this Act derogates from the sovereignty of the Parliament of the United Kingdom.

== Application to Scotland ==
Some jurists have suggested that the Acts of Union 1707 place limits on parliamentary sovereignty and its application to Scotland. Although no Scottish court has yet openly questioned the validity of an Act of Parliament, certain judges have raised the possibility. Thus, in MacCormick v. Lord Advocate, the Lord President (Lord Cooper) stated that "the principle of the unlimited sovereignty of Parliament is a distinctively English principle which has no counterpart in Scottish Constitutional Law", and that legislation contrary to the Act of Union would not necessarily be regarded as constitutionally valid. However Cooper's obiter was his own non binding opinion separate from the ruling of the court of session in a hypothetical case where Scotland and England retained separate constitutions after 1707 rather than merging their constitutions into a single British constitution as what actually occurred.

Also, in Gibson v Lord Advocate, Lord Keith was circumspect about how Scottish courts would deal with an Act, which would substantially alter or negate the essential provisions of the 1707 Act, such as the abolition of the Court of Session or the Church of Scotland or the substitution of English law for Scots law.

The establishment of the Scottish Parliament in 1998 has implications for parliamentary supremacy. For example, although nuclear power is not within its competence, the Scottish government successfully blocked the wishes of the UK government to establish new nuclear power stations in Scotland using control over planning applications which is devolved. While it remains theoretically possible to dissolve the Scottish Parliament, in practice such a change would be politically difficult.

== Development ==
=== Parliament Acts ===
As a rule, any bill must be passed by both Houses of Parliament before being granted royal assent unless the Parliament Act procedure has been properly followed. The Parliament Acts create a system of passing a bill without the consent of the Lords. However, the system does not extend to private or local bills, nor to bills extending the length of a parliament beyond five years. Further, despite the granting of the Speaker's Certificate certifying the validity of such an Act passed under the Parliament Acts, it may still be challenged in the courts. In Jackson v Attorney General, the Court said obiter (in a judgement with seven-to-two majority) that an Act extending the life of a parliament would be considered invalid by the courts if it had been passed under the Parliament Act procedure.

=== Human Rights Act ===
The Human Rights Act 1998 confirmed the UK's commitment to the European Convention on Human Rights. In a white paper, the government expressed that "to make provision in the Bill for the courts to set aside Acts of Parliament would confer on the judiciary a general power over the decisions of Parliament which under our present constitutional arrangements they do not possess, and would be likely on occasions to draw the judiciary into serious conflict with Parliament". According to the theory that a parliament cannot bind its successors, any form of a Bill of Rights cannot be entrenched, and a subsequent parliament could repeal the act. In the government's words, "[It is our tradition] to allow any Act of Parliament to be amended or repealed by a subsequent Act of Parliament." However, it would have been possible to apply human rights rules to previous (rather than future) legislation. The government also confirmed that it had no plans to devise a special [entrenchment] arrangement for the bill.

(1) So far as it is possible to do so, primary legislation and subordinate legislation must be read and given effect in a way which is compatible with the Convention rights. — Human Rights Act 1988, s. 3.

Section 3 of the Human Rights Act 1998 requires UK courts to practice "reading down" in order to apply national law consistently with the European Convention on Human Rights. "Reading down" is a practice in law, by which the judge first assumes that a law complies with the constitution, and thereafter finds an interpretation of the law which is "sufficiently narrow" so as to be constitutional. It is usually practised on laws which are written in extremely broad or all-encompassing ways. The principle of reading down aims to preserve parliamentary sovereignty by minimising conflicts between UK law and the ECHR, without allowing the courts to strike down primary legislation. Legislation can be found to be incompatible, if reading down is impossible or would effectively change the legislation itself. In that case, the court will issue a "declaration of incompatibility," which is non-binding upon parliament by the doctrine of parliamentary sovereignty. However, legislation declared incompatible is almost always amended by parliament.

=== Judicial treatment ===
Appellate courts in the United Kingdom including the Supreme Court (and the House of Lords) have had to handle a number of cases that deal with the limits of Parliamentary sovereignty.

In Jackson v Attorney General, the appellants questioned the validity of the Parliament Act 1949. All nine judges accepted that the court had jurisdiction to consider whether the 1949 Act was valid. They looked to distinguish the case from that of Pickin v British Railways Board, where the unequivocal belief of the judges had been that "the courts in this country have no power to declare enacted law to be invalid". The judges believed that whereas Pickin had challenged the inner workings of Parliament, which a court could not do, Jackson questioned the interpretation of a statute.

The Supreme Court had to deal with questions of Parliamentary sovereignty in R v Chaytor, which concerned criminal prosecutions of MPs involved in the parliamentary expenses scandal. The court ruled that submitting expenses did not amount to proceedings in Parliament, and so Parliamentary privilege does not apply.

== See also ==
- History of the constitution of the United Kingdom § Worldwide influence
- Separation of powers in the United Kingdom
- Rule of law in the United Kingdom
