= R (Jackson) v Attorney General =

UK House of Lords case

- Court: House of Lords
- Full case name: Regina (on the application of Jackson and others) v Attorney General
- Decided: 13 October 2005
- Citations: [2005] UKHL 56; [2006] 1 AC 262
- Transcript: House of Lords transcript

Case history
- Prior action: Divisional court ([2005] EWHC 94 (Admin))
- Appealed from: Court of Appeal ([2005] EWCA Civ 126, [2005] QB 579)

Court membership
- Judges sitting: Lord Bingham; Lord Nicholls; Lord Steyn; Lord Hope; Lord Rodger; Lord Walker; Baroness Hale; Lord Carswell; Lord Brown

Case opinions
- The Parliament Act 1911 could be used to pass the Parliament Act 1949; the Hunting Act was therefore validly enacted using the Parliament Acts procedure.

Keywords
- Acts of Parliament; Hunting; Parliament Acts 1911 and 1949; Parliamentary sovereignty; Subordinate legislation

R (Jackson) v Attorney General [2005] UKHL 56 is a House of Lords case noted for containing obiter comments by the judiciary acting in their official capacity (Note: Panara and Varney in Local Government in Europe write: "To date, the only case to have suggested a possible willingness of the courts to find certain legislation passed by Parliament to be unlawful is R. (Jackson) v. Attorney General. The House of Lords found, in an obiter dictum, that one day it might be that the courts could find a piece of legislation to be in breach of the principle of legality.") suggesting that there may be limits to parliamentary sovereignty, the orthodox position being that it is unlimited in the United Kingdom.

The case, brought by John Jackson and two other members of the Countryside Alliance, challenged the use of the Parliament Acts 1911 and 1949 to enact the Hunting Act 2004. The appellants claimed that this Act was invalid as it had been passed using a legislative procedure introduced by the Parliament Act 1949 which allowed Acts of Parliament to be passed without the consent of the House of Lords if they had been delayed by that chamber for a year. This claim was based on the argument that the enactment of the Parliament Act 1949 was itself invalid, as it had been passed using a similar procedure introduced by the Parliament Act 1911.

A divisional court and Court of Appeal both rejected this claim, although the Court of Appeal held that Parliament Acts procedure could not be used to effect "fundamental constitutional changes". The case was appealed again to the House of Lords. In relation to preliminary issues, the court held that it had jurisdiction to examine the validity of the Hunting Act as a question of statutory interpretation (whether the 1911 Act could be used to enact the 1949 Act); standing was not challenged. On the substantive issue, the court ruled there were no limits to the type of legislation that could be passed using the Parliament Acts except for the express limitations contained in the legislation. The Parliament Act 1949 had therefore been validly passed using the 1911 Act and the Hunting Act was consequently also held to be an Act of Parliament. In obiter comments made in the judgment, Lord Steyn, Lord Hope and Baroness Hale suggested that there might be limits to parliamentary sovereignty (although Lord Bingham and Lord Carswell implicitly supported the orthodox view that there are no limits to parliamentary sovereignty).

Jackson prompted debate about the legitimacy of limiting parliamentary sovereignty and the theoretical justifications for the ruling. Alison Young suggests that the opinions could be explained by the Parliament Act 1911 modifying the rule of recognition defining valid legal documents or by the Act redefining Parliament in a manner that binds the courts. Christopher Forsyth argues that the Parliament Acts redefined Parliament to be a bicameral body for all legislation which also has a method of unicamerally legislating (except to extend Parliament beyond five years). Jeffrey Jowell proposes that there are two reasons for limiting parliamentary sovereignty – if the democratic legitimacy of the legislature were undermined by its acts or if the body attempted to remove fundamental rights in a democratic society – and cites support for these arguments from the judgment. The case was also criticised for claims made by Lord Steyn and Lord Hope that the doctrine of parliamentary sovereignty was solely a judicial creation.

== Facts ==
In the United Kingdom, bills are normally presented to the monarch for Royal Assent after they have been passed by both the House of Commons and the House of Lords, at which point they become primary legislation as Acts of Parliament. However, bills can also be passed using the Parliament Acts 1911 and 1949. The Parliament Act 1911 allowed bills to be presented for Royal Assent without the assent of the House of Lords if they had been passed by the House of Commons in three successive parliamentary sessions and there had been a delay of two years. The Parliament Act 1949, passed using the Parliament Act procedure, amended the 1911 Act to reduce the power of delay to two successive sessions and a period of one year. The legislation defines two exceptions in section 2(1) of the Parliament Act 1911: Money Bills can only be delayed for one month and "Bill[s] containing any provision to extend the maximum duration of Parliament beyond five years" are not eligible to use the procedure.

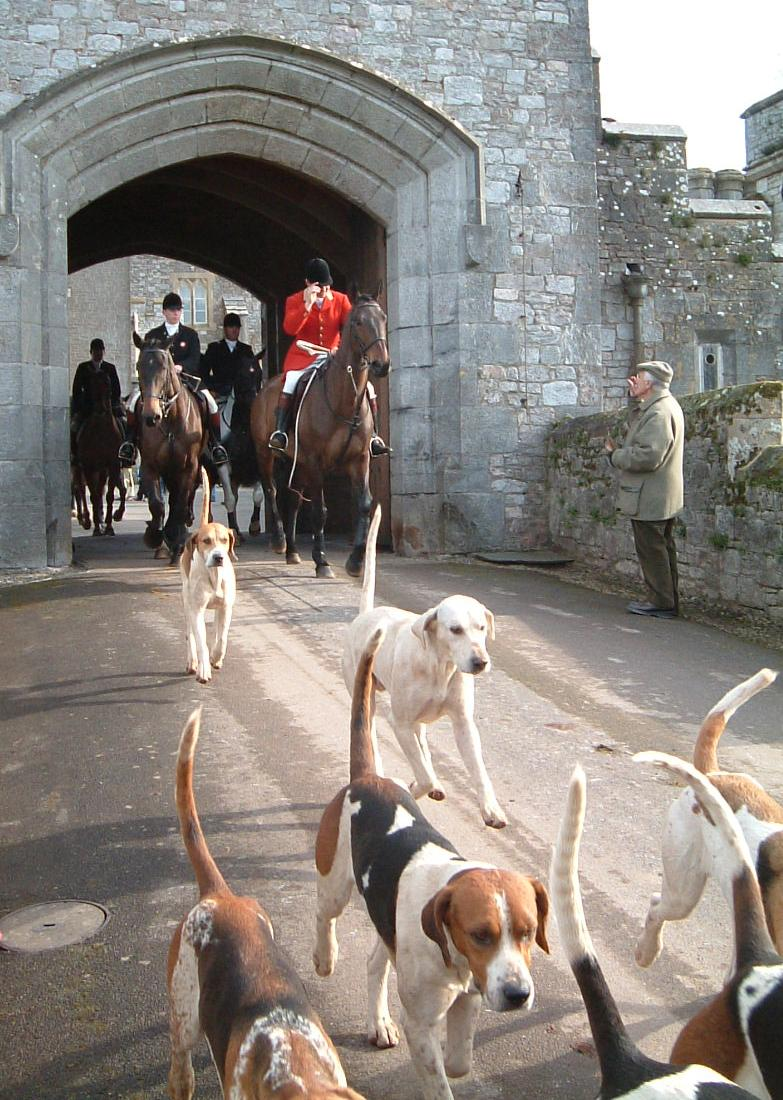
A hunt leaves Powderham Castle on 18 February 2005, the last day the activity was legal following the passage of the Hunting Act.

The Hunting Bill was introduced as part of Labour’s 2001 general election manifesto pledge to hold a free vote on banning fox hunting and would make it illegal to hunt wild animals in England and Wales with dogs except in limited circumstances. The bill was passed by the House of Commons on 3 December 2002 but rejected by the House of Lords. It was reintroduced to, and passed by, the House of Commons on 9 September 2004, but was significantly amended by the House of Lords. The House of Commons rejected the amendments on 18 November and the bill was granted Royal Assent later that day through the use of the Parliament Acts. The Hunting Act was due to come into force on 18 February 2005.

== Judgment ==
=== Divisional court ===
John Jackson, Patrick Martin and Harriet Hughes, all members of the Countryside Alliance, sought judicial review of the use of the Parliament Acts to pass the Hunting Act. They claimed that the 1949 Act had not been lawfully passed either because the 1911 Act could not be used to amend itself or because it provided a method of making delegated or subordinate legislation which could not alter the process of legislating. Consequently, they claimed, the 1949 Act had not reduced the delay specified in the 1911 Act and the Hunting Act, which was passed only in accordance with the requirements as amended by the 1949 Act, was invalid.

The case was heard in a divisional court by Lord Justice Kay and Mr Justice Collins in January 2005. In their judgment, they found that the legislation made using the 1911 Act could modify the Act, as indicated by the reference to "any Public Bill" [emphasis in original] being permitted to use the Parliament Acts (except for a limited number of express exceptions). Furthermore, they ruled that the 1911 Act did not create a method of making delegated legislation, but was instead a redefinition of the relationship between the House of Commons and the House of Lords. Moreover, there was found to be "no established principle applicable to this case which denies a power of amendment of the earlier statute in the absence of the express conferral of one specifically dealing with amendment". The Parliament Act 1949 was therefore found to have been validly passed using the Parliament Act 1911 and the Hunting Act was consequently also held to be an Act of Parliament.

=== Court of Appeal ===
The case was appealed to the Court of Appeal, where it was heard by the Lord Chief Justice, Lord Woolf; the Master of the Rolls, Lord Phillips; and Lord Justice May in February 2005. In addition to acknowledging the limitations stated in the Parliament Act 1911, the court found that "the greater the scale of the constitutional change proposed by any amendment, the more likely it is that it will fall outside the powers contained in the 1911 Act." Fundamental constitutional changes could therefore not be passed using the Parliament Acts, including extending the duration of Parliament and abolishing the House of Lords. However, the Parliament Act 1949, as a "relatively modest and straightforward amendment" to the 1911 Act that did not "extend to making changes of a fundamentally different nature to the relationship between the House of Lords and the Commons", was found to be within the scope of the Parliament Act 1911. The 1949 Act and, consequently, the Hunting Act were therefore held to be valid legislation and the appeal was dismissed.

=== House of Lords ===
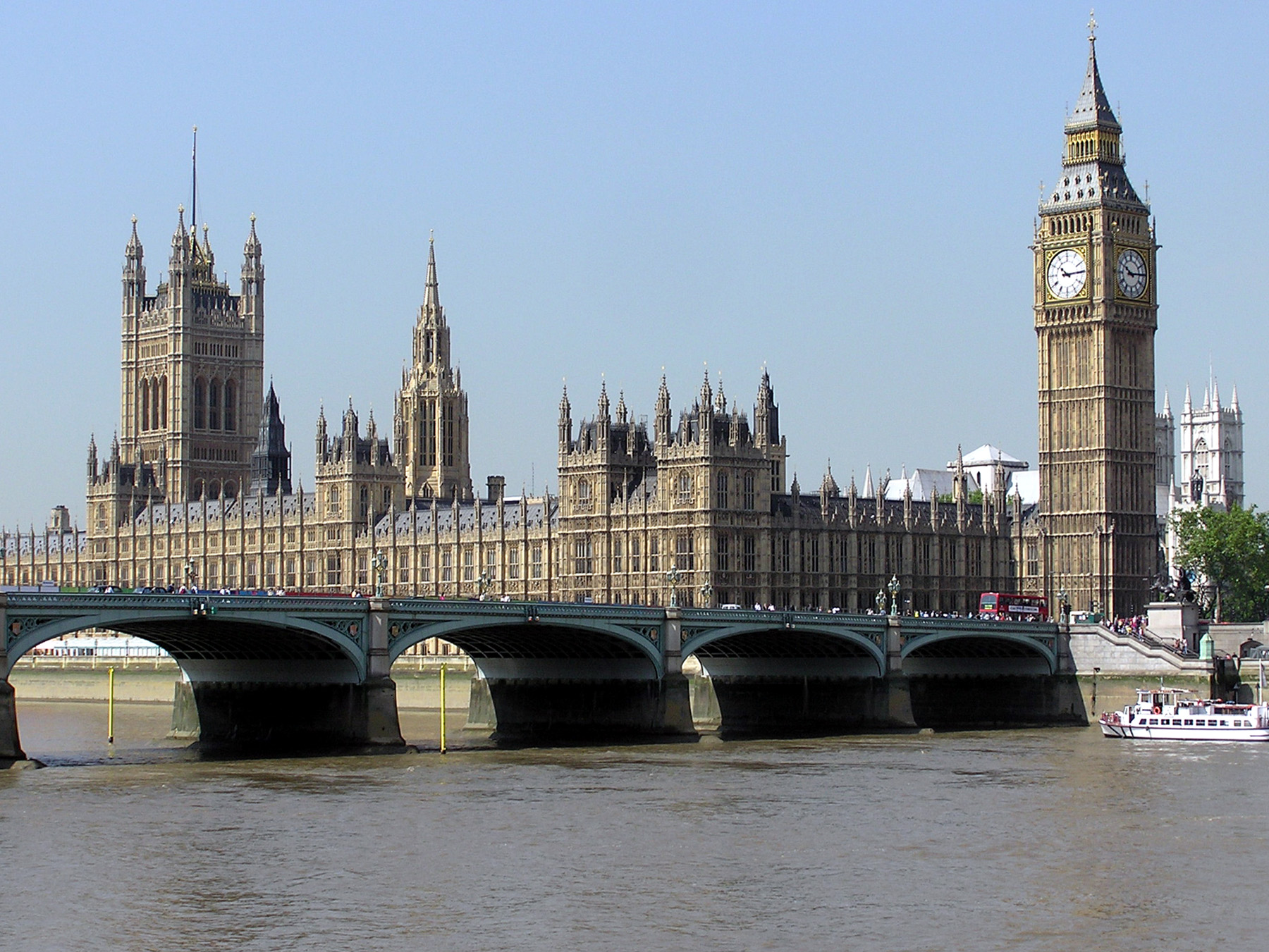
The Palace of Westminster, where the highest court in the United Kingdom, the House of Lords, sat until its judicial functions were transferred to the Supreme Court in 2009.

The case was appealed again to the House of Lords, where it was heard by Lord Bingham, Lord Nicholls, Lord Steyn, Lord Hope, Lord Rodger, Lord Walker, Baroness Hale, Lord Carswell and Lord Brown on 13 and 14 July 2005. Nine judges were selected to hear the appeal, as opposed to the usual number of five, due to the significant constitutional issues the case raised.

==== Appellants' arguments ====
Sir Sydney Kentridge, lead counsel for the appellants, summarised their arguments as follows:

1. Legislation made under the 1911 act is delegated or subordinate, not primary.
2. The legislative power conferred by section 2(1) of the 1911 Act is not unlimited in scope and must be read according to established principles of statutory interpretation.
3. Among these is the principle that powers conferred on a body by an enabling Act may not be enlarged or modified by that body unless there are express words authorising such enlargement or modification.
4. Accordingly, section 2(1) of the 1911 Act does not authorise the Commons to remove, attenuate or modify in any respect any of the conditions on which its law-making power is granted.
5. Even if, contrary to the appellants' case, the Court of Appeal was right to regard section 2(1) of the 1911 Act as wide enough to authorise "modest" amendments of the Commons' law-making powers, the amendments in the 1949 Act were not "modest", but substantial and significant.

If the Parliament Act 1949 were found not to be an Act of Parliament on any of the above grounds, all legislation passed using the Parliament Acts since the introduction of the 1949 Act, including the Hunting Act, would also not be valid Acts of Parliament, being passed only in accordance with the 1949 Act (rejection in two successive sessions and a delay of one year) as opposed to the more onerous requirements of the 1911 Act (rejection in three successive sessions and a delay of two years).

==== Standing ====
The House of Lords' judgment was given on 13 October 2005.

Parties bringing judicial review must have sufficient interest in the challenged subject. Professor Mullen therefore suggests that it is at first glance surprising that standing was not contested: the appellants brought proceedings in their personal capacities, yet had not even been threatened with prosecution. However, he suggests that no challenge was made because the legislation was likely to be challenged at some point and it was more convenient for the Government to have the legal issue decided before the Hunting Act came into force. Moreover, the recent expansion of standing for issues of public interest, such as the validity of an Act of Parliament, would have made a successful challenge more difficult.

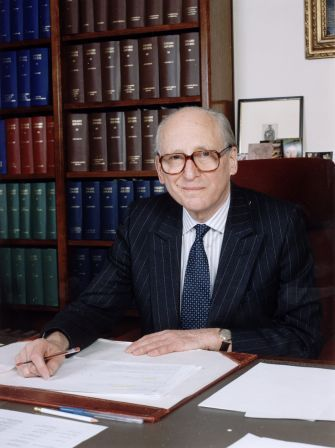
Lord Bingham, who had previously held the posts of Lord Chief Justice and Master of the Rolls, gave the leading judgment in the House of Lords decision.

==== Justiciability ====
Another preliminary issue, that of whether the House of Lords had jurisdiction to challenge the validity of an Act of Parliament, was also not argued by the Attorney General in a move described by Ekins as "an extraordinary concession". The enrolled bill rule, affirmed in Pickin v British Railways Board, had established that the courts could not examine the procedure by which legislation had been passed. Furthermore, the Bill of Rights 1689 prohibits review of parliamentary proceedings outside Parliament and section 3 of the Parliament Act 1911 specifically provides that "any certificate of the Speaker of the House of Commons [certifying that a bill is eligible to use the Parliament Acts procedure] shall not be questioned in any court of law". Lord Bingham therefore wrote that he "[felt] some sense of strangeness at the exercise which the courts have... been invited to undertake in these proceedings".

However, the judges found that the court had jurisdiction because the case brought up a legal issue, that of statutory interpretation (whether the 1911 Act could be used to enact the 1949 Act), rather than being examination of parliamentary proceedings. Lord Bingham noted that the bill was not enacted by both Houses of Parliament, as it was in Pickin, and that "the appellants have raised a question of law which cannot, as such, be resolved by Parliament ... so it seems to me necessary that the courts should resolve it, and that to do so involves no breach of constitutional propriety". Lord Nicholls distinguished Jackson from Pickin as a case examining the correct interpretation of the 1911 Act, an evaluation for the courts rather than Parliament; Lord Hope concurred, noting that there was no absolute prohibition on courts evaluating the validity of Acts of Parliament; and Lord Carswell agreed that the case raised "a question of law which falls within the scope of courts of law carrying out their regular function". All nine judges accepted that the court had jurisdiction to consider whether the 1949 Act was valid.

Mullen suggests that the failure of the Attorney General to challenge either standing or justiciability in the case could have wider implications by lowering the barriers to litigation and also by providing a precedent that people acting in their personal capacities can challenge the validity of primary legislation.

==== Status of legislation passed using the Parliament Act 1911 ====
The appellants' primary argument was that legislation passed using the Parliament Act 1911 is delegated and therefore could not be used to amend the procedure of enactment. However, their Lordships disagreed with this claim on the basis of the clear language in the Act. Lord Bingham found that the phrase "become an Act of Parliament on the Royal Assent being signified" denoted primary legislation. "The meaning of the expression 'Act of Parliament' is not doubtful, ambiguous or obscure ... It is used, and used only, to denote primary legislation ... The 1911 Act did, of course, effect an important constitutional change, but the change lay not in authorising a new form of sub-primary parliamentary legislation but in creating a new way of enacting primary legislation." Lord Nicholls agreed that the 1911 Act provided "a second, parallel route" of making Acts of Parliament and that "it would be inconsistent with [the parliamentary] intention to interpret [the legislation] as subject to an inherent, overarching limitation comparable to that applicable to delegated legislation." Lord Steyn, Lord Hope and Lord Brown concurred in similar terms.

==== Limits of the Parliament Act 1911 ====
The House of Lords rejected the Court of Appeal's finding that there was a distinction between non-fundamental constitutional changes, which could be passed using the Parliament Act 1911, and fundamental constitutional changes, which could not; Lord Bingham argued that "the ... solution finds no support in the language of the Act, in principle or in the historical record". Of the nine judges, only Lord Carswell suggested that there may be implied limits to the use of the Parliament Acts, but acknowledged the difficulty of defining the extent of these restrictions.

However, seven of the judges endorsed the express limitation that a statute extending the life of Parliament beyond five years could not be passed using the Parliament Acts; a further five agreed with Lord Nicholls that the House of Commons could not "do indirectly by two stages what the House [could not] do directly in one stage" by using the Parliament Acts to remove the express limitation and then enact legislation extending the life of Parliament, a restriction that was considered necessary to ensure the effectiveness of the express limitation. Lord Bingham was the only judge to explicitly reject the validity of this implied limitation, arguing that there were no reasons for preventing the alteration of the clause limiting the subject matter of full Acts of Parliament and that "it cannot have been contemplated that if, however improbably, the Houses found themselves in irreconcilable deadlock on this point, the government should have to resort to the creation of peers".

==== Outcome ====
The House of Lords found that the Parliament Act 1911 did not have any limitations that would prevent it being used to enact the Parliament Act 1949. The 1949 Act had therefore validly amended the requirements for a bill to use the Parliament Acts procedure and the Hunting Act, which was passed in accordance with these amended requirements, was consequently also held to be valid; the appellants' appeal was dismissed.

== Significance ==
Cosmo Graham argues that Jackson could be seen as "a constitutional curio, dealing with an obscure point, which is now effectively settled in favour of the Executive"; the case, from this perspective, is of no practical consequences given the limited use of the Parliament Acts and plans to further reduce the power of the House of Lords to delay bills. However, he suggests that Jackson is part of a trend of increased willingness by the judiciary to examine the claimed existence of executive powers and "to push at the borders of traditional techniques of judicial interpretation".

=== Limits to parliamentary sovereignty ===
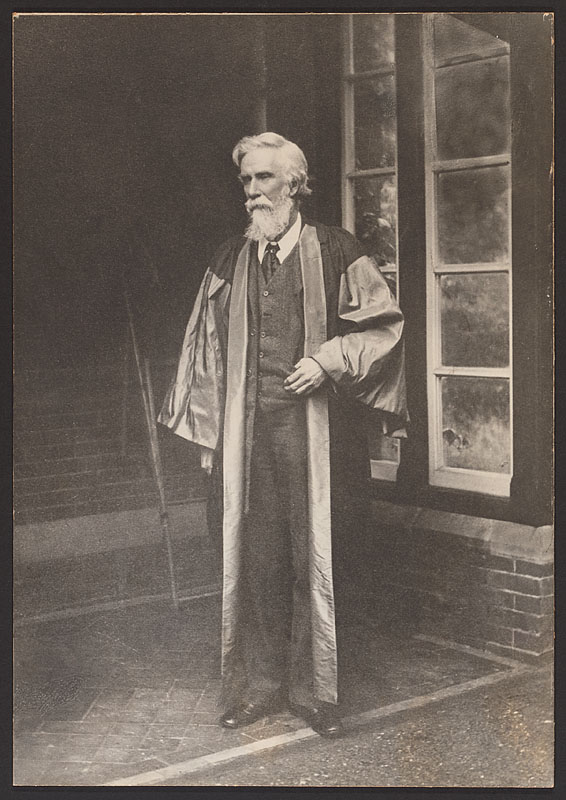
Albert Venn Dicey, whose traditional formulation of parliamentary sovereignty stated that Parliament could legislate on any topic and that no body could make superior legislation or limit Parliament's competences.

Common law constitutionalism, a view that there are fundamental constitutional values that are protected even from interference by Parliament, had become increasingly popular at the time of Jackson. Four recent cases had found that "in the absence of express language or necessary implication to the contrary, the courts [will] presume that even the most general words were intended to be subject to the basic rights of the individual". There had also been extrajudicial comments by serving judges that parliamentary sovereignty may not be absolute: Lord Woolf had written that "if Parliament did the unthinkable, then I would say that courts would also be required to act in a manner which was without precedent" while John Laws had argued that "ultimate sovereignty rests ... not with those who wield governmental power, but in the conditions under which they are permitted to do so. The constitution, not the Parliament, is in this sense sovereign". However, Jackson contained the first express support from judges acting in their official capacity for the proposition that courts might have the authority to strike down an Act of Parliament if it violated fundamental constitutional principles (albeit obiter). This was a significant challenge to the orthodox view of parliamentary sovereignty, expressed by Albert Venn Dicey, that Parliament can make and unmake law on any topic and that no body can make a higher form of law than Parliament or set aside primary legislation.

Lord Steyn,

If that is so, it is not unthinkable that circumstances could arise where the courts may have to qualify a principle established on a different hypothesis of constitutionalism. In exceptional circumstances involving an attempt to abolish judicial review or the ordinary role of the courts, the Appellate Committee of the House of Lords or a new Supreme Court may have to consider whether this is a constitutional fundamental which even a sovereign Parliament acting at the behest of a complaisant House of Commons cannot abolish.

However, Graham suggests that Lord Steyn's comments were limited to the use of the Parliament Acts and would not apply to legislation enacted using the ordinary legislative procedure. He also argues that it would be difficult to explain how courts would refuse to apply legislation unless human rights were involved, citing the example of the removal of judicial review: using fundamental common law principles to interpret legislation is very different from striking down legislation supported by the elected House of Commons, and would be even more contentious if the legislation only substantially modified judicial review procedure.

Lord Hope followed on from Lord Steyn.

Parliamentary sovereignty is no longer, if it ever was, absolute ... It is no longer right to say that its freedom to legislate admits of no qualification whatever. Step by step, gradually but surely, the English principle of the absolute legislative sovereignty of Parliament ... is being qualified ... The rule of law enforced by the courts is the ultimate controlling factor on which our constitution is based. The fact that your Lordships have been willing to hear this appeal and to give judgment upon it is another indication that the courts have a part to play in defining the limits of Parliament's legislative sovereignty.

Lord Hope also argued that Parliament should not be able to pass legislation that "is so absurd or so unacceptable that the populace at large refuses to recognise it as law". Jeffrey Jowell suggests that these comments were influenced by Lord Hope's position as a Law Lord from Scotland, where it is unclear whether Parliamentary sovereignty is recognised following MacCormick v Lord Advocate, in which the doctrine was seen as "a distinctively English principle which has no counterpart in Scottish constitutional law".

Baroness Hale similarly suggested that there may be limits to Parliament's legislative competence.

The courts will, of course, decline to hold that Parliament has interfered with fundamental rights unless it has made its intentions crystal clear. The courts will treat with particular suspicion (and might even reject) any attempt to subvert the rule of law by removing governmental action affecting the rights of the individual from all judicial scrutiny.

Although no judge expressly disapproved the opinions that there were limits to Parliament's legislative capabilities, Mullen suggests that Lord Bingham and Lord Carswell intended to impliedly rebut these suggestions. Lord Bingham affirmed that "the bedrock of the British constitution is ... the supremacy of the Crown in Parliament" while Lord Carswell stated:

I do not, and I have no doubt your Lordships do not, have any wish to expand the role of the judiciary at the expense of any other organ of the State or to seek to frustrate the properly expressed wish of Parliament as contained in legislation. The attribution in certain quarters of such a wish to the judiciary is misconceived and appears to be the product of lack of understanding of the judicial function and the sources of law which the courts are bound to apply.

=== Justifying limits to the 1911 Act ===
Alison Young argues that Jackson entrenched section 2(1) of the Parliament Act 1911 by requiring that it only be overturned by adopting a specific manner and form (approval of the bill changing the 1911 Act by the House of Lords). She suggests that Lord Steyn and Baroness Hale would explain this result using a self-embracing view of sovereignty – that Parliament as a whole is sovereign and can therefore bind later parliaments. The passing of the 1911 Act was from this perspective a redefinition of Parliament that binds the courts. However, she notes that Lord Hope, Lord Nicholls and Lord Carswell provide an alternative explanation for the decision: that the 1911 Act modified the rule of recognition defining valid legal documents. Under this view, the 1911 Parliament did not bind future Parliaments simply by passing the Parliament Act 1911, but by the legislation being recognised, in political fact, as valid; the courts were therefore altering the legal rule of recognition accordingly. This perspective allows the orthodox continuing view of parliamentary sovereignty (that every new parliament is sovereign) to be held while still explaining why future parliaments cannot modify section 2(1) of the 1911 Act.

Christopher Forsyth suggests that the limitations of the 1911 Act could be explained by the common law constitutionalism theory, but argues that "if the judiciary frustrated by the failings of the elected legislature were to assert a power to hold Acts of Parliament invalid it would be stepping from law into politics and the outcome of its efforts impossible to predict". He instead proposes that section 2(1) of the 1911 Act was a redefinition of Parliament: it is a bicameral body for all legislation but also has a method of unicamerally legislating (except to extend Parliament beyond five years) if the requirements of the Parliament Acts have been fulfilled. However, he also notes that a "sufficiently determined elected House, coupled with an executive willing to influence the composition of the House of Lords by the creation of peers ... would in the end get its way. If the government advisors had a sufficiently secure Commons majority, it would in the end be able to extend the life of Parliament."

Jeffrey Jowell proposes two justifications for limiting parliamentary sovereignty: legitimacy and the current hypothesis of constitutionalism. The argument from legitimacy highlights that Parliament's supremacy depends on the democratic and accountable nature of legislature; anything that undermines this status would invalidate the applicability of the doctrine. Jowell suggests that this view was expressly supported by Lord Hope and impliedly supported in other opinions that legislation limiting Parliament's accountability would be challenged by the judiciary. The argument based on the current hypothesis of constitutionalism reasons that no authority should be allowed to violate fundamental rights in a democratic society: they are essential features that cannot be removed, even by a supposedly sovereign Parliament. This view was also expressly endorsed in Jackson by Lord Hope, who regarded Parliament's sovereignty as subject to the rule of law.

=== Parliamentary sovereignty as a judicial creation ===
Richard Ekins criticises as "historically false [and] jurisprudentially absurd" the claim made by Lord Steyn and Lord Hope that parliamentary sovereignty was solely a judicial creation. He argues that the doctrine is fundamental to the UK constitution because it has been accepted by all three branches of government; "while the judges also accept the rule, they did not create it and may not (lawfully) change it". However, Stuart Lakin responds that parliamentary sovereignty does, in practice and in theory, depend on its recognition by the courts.

Given that Parliament derives its powers from law, we have a normative reason to erase the concept of sovereignty from our constitutional landscape ... [This perspective] demands that Parliament may only exercise power in accordance with the principles – whatever they may be – that justify that power.

== See also ==
- United Kingdom constitutional law
- United Kingdom administrative law
