= Rule of law in the United Kingdom =

Common law principles of governance

The rule of law is one of the longest established common law fundamental principles of the governance of the United Kingdom, dating to Magna Carta of 1215, particularly jurisprudence following its late 13th century re-drafting. At a minimum, it subjects an otherwise absolute monarch or executive and all free people within its jurisdictions (i.e. England and Wales, Scotland and Northern Ireland), to legal doctrines known as the general principles of law. It has evolved to work alongside the equal application of the law to all free people, and within the framework of the constitutional monarchy to support the legal doctrine of parliamentary sovereignty. Exactly what it entails beyond this and the way that different aspects of the rule of law principle are applied, depends on the specific situation and era.

Among recognised academics in this field are Albert Dicey, Joseph Raz, Friedrich Hayek, and Trevor Allan, who have proposed contrasting ideas about the scope of the rule of law: specifically, whether the emphasis is on legal form or substantive content and normatively if it should be.

== History ==
The rule of law is emphasised through many separate ideas. Among them are that law and order in contrast to anarchy, the running of government in line with the law, and normative discussion about the rights of the state as compared to the individual. Albert Venn Dicey described the rule of law as acting in three ways: the predominance of regular law as opposed to the influence of arbitrary power; equality before the law; and, that constitutional laws are not the source but the consequence of the rights of individuals.

The specific checking of arbitrary power is its oldest and most definitive concept as a consequence of Magna Carta and its byproduct, the first representative Parliament of England, which denied for the first time from the King the completely unfettered powers formerly exercised by the most powerful absolute monarchs on the throne. The key clause in the document has been consistently translated from identical, though abbreviated, Latin.

To no one will we sell, to no one deny or delay right or justice.

This was by the 14th century interpreted by Parliament as guaranteeing trial by jury. Similarly, in Scotland, a parliament evolved. Before its union with England and Wales in 1707 the Parliament of Scotland was long portrayed as a constitutionally defective body that acted merely as a rubber stamp for royal decisions, but research during the early 21st century has found that it played an active role in Scottish affairs, and was sometimes a thorn in the side of the Scottish crown.

The enforcement of the doctrine of habeas corpus was widely achieved in the 17th century. However, with slavery primarily in the colonies continuing, it was not until the successes of abolitionism in the United Kingdom, the Slave Trade Act 1807 and Slavery Abolition Act 1833, that equality before the law throughout the Empire was in a formal legal sense achieved in this respect.

The Bill of Rights 1689 and the Act of Settlement 1701 imposed constraints on the monarch and it fell to Parliament under the doctrine of parliamentary sovereignty to impose its own constitutional conventions involving the people, the monarch (or Secretaries of State in cabinet and Privy Council) and the court system. All of these three groups of institutions have proven wary of upsetting or offending the others, adopting conventions designed to ensure their long-term integrity and hence self-preservation.

After ordinary executive decisions were delegated, such as to a Prime Minister and cabinet system from the mid 18th century, following on from the Bill of Rights 1689 in the Glorious Revolution, the highest courts laid down jurisprudence entrenching the growing doctrines of the Enrolled bill rule and parliamentary sovereignty. In return, Parliament has acquiesced in the senior courts' ability to declare unlawful new legislation based on older Treaty-based legislation, for instance the Merchant Shipping Act 1988 in the Factortame I and IV decisions; executive action claims in judicial review are now often based on the Human Rights Act 1998 (and in turn the Universal Declaration of Human Rights and International Covenants). These developments have entrenched the doctrine of the rule of law as part of the constitution.

== Jurisprudence ==
=== Substantive and formal debate ===
Substantive versions of the concept of the rule of law, as they apply to the United Kingdom, ask normative questions about what rules the government should be under, rather than merely ensuring it follows those it is under. The rule of law is thus invoked when considering controversial powers of the government that stray from precedent, depart from the European Convention of Human Rights as embodied in the Human Rights Act 1998, or break new legislative ground.

Trevor Allan sees the rule of law as, primarily, a vehicle for the protection of rights against "irresponsible legislative encroachment" in the face of a government with a large authority, backed by a significant majority in the House of Commons. The rule of law is contrasted with rule by men and the arbitrary power one man or government official might exercise over the other. Allan thus supports the idea that there are core features of the rule of law, including government acting within its legal authority. Noting that this is not incompatible with wide discretionary powers on the part of the government, Allan accepts that too wide a definition of the rule of law is to expound a complete social philosophy.

On the other hand, Joseph Raz has argued that the rule of law should be limited to formal values, which include prospective, open and clear laws; relatively stable laws; laws based on stable, open and open and clear rules; the independence of the judiciary; the principles of natural justice (unbiased judiciary); judicial review of implementation; accessible courts; and no perversion of the law by policing discretion, inter alia. He suggests that the rule of law has become a by-word for general political ideals, separate from its actual meaning. Instead, he identifies principles of "open and relatively stable" lawmaking, and laws that the public can live their lives by. This concept is a merely formal one, he identifies, because this could be achieved through dictatorship, democracy, or any other means. Raz drew on similar ideas expressed by Friedrich Hayek, including "stripped of all technicalities, [the rule of law] means that government in all its actions is bound by rules fixed and announced beforehand – rules which make it possible to foresee with fair certainty how the authority will use its coercive powers in given circumstances and to plan one's individual affairs on the basis of this knowledge."

Raz identifies government following the law as a tautology: if the will of those inside the government were expressed outside their legal constraints, they would no longer be acting as the government. He therefore characterises this legal form argument as one of mere obedience to the law — ensuring those in government follow the laws as those outside it should. He rejects that as the sole conception of the rule of law.

=== Purpose ===
Law and order requires the prevention of crime as well as the contribution of authorities. As such, it does not matter by what means these are achieved, or what the characteristics of the law are. This concept of the rule of the law can, therefore, be upheld by even the most tyrannical dictatorship. Such a regime may allow for the normal operation of courts between private parties, and the limited questioning of the government within a dictatorial framework. Whether the rule of law can truly exist without democracy is debated. Freedom of expression and action seems to be what the prevention of crime allows citizens. Therefore, limiting it by autocratic means has been considered incompatible with the rule of law. At the same time, it has been regarded that for democracy to thrive, the rule of law must be observed.

== Case law ==
Public authorities must act within the law assigned to them. Any actions taken outside the law are ultra vires and cannot be sanctioned by the courts. Entick v Carrington was a leading case in terms of the English law where the courts reviewed the powers of government to trespass on private property, with the famous dictum of Camden LJ: "If this is law it would be found in our books, but no such law ever existed in this country". This is identified by Dicey as part of his first conception: "a man may with us be punished for a breach of law, but he can be punished for nothing else".

In the 2008 case of R (Bancoult) v Secretary of State for Foreign and Commonwealth Affairs (No 2), an Order in Council of the British government was found to have no basis in law by a minority of judges on final appeal, which held that additional powers can be granted to actors on behalf of the government only through parliament.

In the United Kingdom, sanctions for departing from these rules come through ordinary court procedure, such as contempt of court. Government departments are directly liable for damage caused by their acts. However, the sovereign retains immunity from prosecution. In M v Home Office, the Home Secretary was found to be liable for contempt of court.

The substantive interpretation of the rule of law is controversial in the United Kingdom. The judiciary has found difficulty in deciding what the specific constitutional or fundamental rights the rule of law should enforce. In A v Home Secretary, the courts ruled that the right not to be held indefinitely without trial was in line with the European Convention. However, it is questionable to what extent such a principle can continue to be deemed appropriate if circumstances changed. In R (Corner House Research), the defendant, a prosecutorial body, was deemed to allow national security considerations to take precedence over a thorough investigation into alleged bribery in certain arms deals, an apparent departure from the principle of completely equal application of the law, which has been perceived as a breach of the modern-day rule of law.

== See also ==
- Constitution of the United Kingdom
- History of the constitution of the United Kingdom § Worldwide influence
- Separation of Powers
- Parliamentary sovereignty in the United Kingdom
- Separation of powers in the United Kingdom
