= Separation of powers in the United Kingdom =

The concept of the separation of powers has been applied to the United Kingdom and the nature of its executive (UK government, Scottish Government, Welsh Government and Northern Ireland Executive), judicial (England and Wales, Scotland and Northern Ireland) and legislative (UK Parliament, Scottish Parliament, Senedd and Northern Ireland Assembly) functions. Historically, the apparent merger of the executive and the legislature, with a powerful Prime Minister drawn from the largest party in parliament and usually with a safe majority, led theorists to contend that the separation of powers is not applicable to the United Kingdom. However, in recent years it does seem to have been adopted as a necessary part of the UK constitution.

The independence of the judiciary has never been questioned as a principle, although application is problematic. Personnel have been increasingly isolated from the other organs of government, no longer sitting in the House of Lords or in the Cabinet. The court's ability to legislate through precedent, its inability to question validly enacted law through legislative supremacy and parliamentary sovereignty, and the role of the Europe-wide institutions to legislate, execute and judge on matters also define the boundaries of the UK system.

== Approach ==
Although the United Kingdom recognises parliamentary sovereignty, writers have stressed the importance of the independence of the judiciary in establishing the rule of law, among them Trevor Allan. The role of the separation of powers has changed with the rise of judicial involvement in the affairs of government. Albert Venn Dicey, writing in 1915 in Introduction to the Study of the Law of the Constitution, described the separation of powers as "the offspring of a double misconception". More recently Sir Ivor Jennings has argued that it is of little relevance, and, faced with the role of the executive within the legislature, some authors describe only the independence of the judiciary as evidence that the model applies to the modern United Kingdom.

Few critics of the applicability of the separation of powers to the United Kingdom question the basic division. The separation of powers has come under the stress of increasing government intervention into social issues outside its former remit dominated by administration and foreign and military policy – the creation of big government. This has been seen by some as having led to a weakening of the concept of government, replaced with the concept of governance. This lends itself to a more flexible approach considering the wide variation in the sorts of things that the "executive" does. A similar approach is to take an approach of public choice theory. The self-interest of political actors, under this theory, bridges the separate sections of government, drawing upon the approach of the Committee on Standards in Public Life which applies the same rules to different organs, although their approach to judges is separate. Either theory would accept that there are wider decision-making processes which are not restricted to a single branch of government. Another important idea is that variations within each separate part of government are as significant as differences in approach between branches, and require similar consideration.

However, Lord Mustill summarised the prevailing modern viewpoint in the 1995 judgment, R. v Home Secretary ex parte Fire Brigades Union:

It is a feature of the peculiarly UK conception of the separation of powers that Parliament, the executive and the courts each have their distinct and largely exclusive domain. Parliament has a legally unchallengeable right to make whatever laws it thinks right. The executive carries on the administration of the country in accordance with the powers conferred on it by law. The courts interpret the laws and see that they are obeyed.

== Division between organs of parliament ==
The UK Parliament creates law through the authority of the King-in-Parliament, securing the support of at least the House of Commons, and usually the House of Lords as well – although since the passing act of the Parliament Act 1911 this has not been necessary. Under the European Communities Act 1972, the organs of the European Communities to legislate for the United Kingdom was recognised, by virtue of that Act. The power to create primary legislation has also been devolved to Scottish and Welsh parliaments and to government ministers and local authorities to create secondary legislation.

The executive comprises all official and public authorities (including local authorities) that govern the UK, from initiating and implementing legislation to the running of local and national services, such as rubbish collections and the police. The civil service remains non-partisan (having little in common with the Cabinet and Prime Minister in that respect). The executive also exercises a number of powers under the Royal Prerogative, including foreign relations; many other actions are taken in the sovereign's name, from whom executive power is derived. The Council and the Commission of the European Union also exercise executive power, as do devolved governments. Within the executive, there is no longer a clear elected–non-elected divide: decision-makers are of both sorts since the widening of the government's remit. The extent to which the Civil Service serves the government, rather than usurping it, is one character of the executive.

The judicial function determines the outcome of disputes and performs minor legislative and administrative functions. It oversees both public and private law through civil and criminal courts and a variety of tribunals. The Human Rights Act 1998 has placed a requirement that courts take into account the jurisprudence of the European Court of Human Rights.

The introduction of a tax is a legislative function; collecting tax is an executive and administrative function; settling tax disputes is a judicial function, as is judicial review of executive decisions. However, such an approach does not in itself enlighten what each role entails: the audit of public expenditure was a judicial function in the fourteenth century; an executive one in the eighteenth; and is now a legislative function. This is not in itself a measure of efficiency or good process, or what the function actually entails.

The separation of powers may require, depending on interpretation, that the membership of the three powers must be separate; that one of the three powers does not control the work of another; or that one organ of government should not exercise the powers of another. Keeping all three roles separate is seen as both theoretically and practically impossible.

== Legislature and executive ==
The legislature and executive have a close relationship in the UK constitution. This led Walter Bagehot to declare the "nearly complete fusion" of the roles in the nineteenth century. Other writers have stressed that the harmonisation of the legislature and executive does not preclude their distinctiveness. By convention, government ministers are drawn from one of the two houses; the weight of democratic responsibility entails that most come from the House of Commons. There is, however, a limit on their number. Most other members of the executive are excluded from holding legislative office, including the Civil Service, the armed forces, and the police, some of whom are prevented from becoming involved in any political affairs. The crossover in personnel is effectively limited to ministers. The Prime Minister wields considerable power on behalf of the executive, as party leader and chief spokesperson for government policy.

When the government has a clear majority it wields a lot of power to push through legislation. A 1978 Select Committee report suggested:

The balance of advantage between Parliament and Government is so weighted in favour of Government that it is inimical to the proper working of our parliamentary democracy.

Between 1979 and 2010, the government had a safe majority which made the scrutiny of the government more difficult, although not impossible. The government could rely on its legislation being passed, although in some cases this did not happen. The Conservative–Liberal Democrat coalition complicated the party structure, since the leader of the Liberal Democrats, Nick Clegg, served as Deputy Prime Minister under a Conservative Prime Minister. However, the legislature can render a government's position untenable through a vote of no confidence, as happened in 1979; on that occasion, as in 1924, a general election was called which the sitting government lost. This was driven by a growth in the political party structure, enforced through party discipline, as increased suffrage meant a far wider remit of government policy platforms.

Secondary legislation – where Parliament passes limited legislative rights to the executive through an Act of Parliament – is also problematic, although necessary for the efficient working of government. Legal rules should be relatable to the Acts of Parliament on which they are based, but this is not always possible. Proper scrutiny of government actions under secondary legislation is needed to prevent abuse.

== Executive and judiciary ==
The Judicial Committee of the Privy Council remains an independent court, despite being organisationally part of the executive. The Lord Chancellor, a member of the Cabinet is no longer a judge since the Constitutional Reform Act 2005. The Attorney General (England and Wales) and the Lord Advocate (Scotland) have "quasi-judicial roles" but are part of the executive.

In terms of control, the independence of the judiciary is confirmed through statute, constitutional convention, and weight of opinion. In England and Wales, judges in superior courts cannot be arbitrarily dismissed by the executive, instead serving whilst in "good behaviour". Those in lower courts have similar protection from dismissal without due cause. Most members of tribunals cannot be dismissed by members of the government department of which they form part. This is important in cases of judicial review and other judicial methods of preventing government abuse of power.

The judiciary undertake minor legislative functions in the form of court procedure, which, whilst the performance of a conflicting power, strengthens their independence. Tribunals are tied, but remain independent from, the executive. Government departments adjudicate on many decisions, and are required to take principles such as fairness and transparency into account in return. The courts provide only one method of dispute resolution, albeit one that is important where the government is one party and independence is necessary. The picture of which decision-making processes should be assigned to which body is complicated. There remain problems with the scope of role of the Home Secretary in the penal system and judicial decisions with regard to sentencing. Nolan LJ, in M v Home Office, noted that:

The proper constitutional relationship of the executive with the courts is that the courts will respect all acts of the executive within its lawful province, and that the executive will respect all decisions of the courts as to what its lawful province is.

In matters such as Extradition of British nationals, courts must first consent and the Home Secretary must agree and sign an Extradition Order or the individual cannot be extradited. A recent example of this is autistic computer-hacker Gary McKinnon being extradited to the United States. The courts decreed that he could be extradited and that it would not harm him. However the Home Secretary announced that she refused to sign the order as she believed it would harm his life rights and could lead to him committing suicide.

== Judiciary and legislature ==
The judges of the Supreme Court do not sit in the House of Lords. Until 2009, the judges appointed as Law Lords formed part of the House of Lords in Parliament. The creation of the Supreme Court ended confusion in name of both capacities. No Member of Parliament may hold a full-time position in the judiciary.

The departure of the judiciary from the House of Lords has led to greater tension between the government, Parliament and the courts, as the senior judges are no longer able to amend and speak on Bills and Peers are no longer able to question the judges and thereby hold them to account.

The legislature retains the right to impeach members of the judiciary by agreement of both houses, but this has only happened once in three hundred years. There are restrictions on the criticism of judges in parliament. Courts are bound to interpret Acts of Parliament, even retrospectively, and legislative supremacy dictates that they cannot declare properly enacted primary legislation invalid. They are not bound by other resolutions of either house. The European Communities Act 1972 placed a legislature-imposed requirement on the judiciary to follow European case law in relevant matters. Although the Human Rights Act 1998 allows the courts to make a declaration of incompatibility, they are required to interpret but may not disapply primary legislation.

Each House of Parliament retains the right to punish offenders within its walls (including exclusive cognisance), with the potential to cause conflict. However, R v Chaytor found that right to be limited in scope, and that it was the court that decided what that scope was. the court thought it very unlikely that "the intention of Parliament" was to protect those guilty of a crime unrelated to parliamentary business in this way. The courts have also exercised a quasi-legislative power through precedent – for example, ending the marital rape exemption in R v R (Rape: marital exemption). There is particular scope for the identification and application of personal liberties, and some cases have shaped the judiciary–legislature relationship.

== See also ==
- European integration
- History of the constitution of the United Kingdom § Worldwide influence
- Parliamentary sovereignty in the United Kingdom
- Rule of law in the United Kingdom
