= Pickin v British Railways Board =

Case of the House of Lords on parliamentary sovereignty

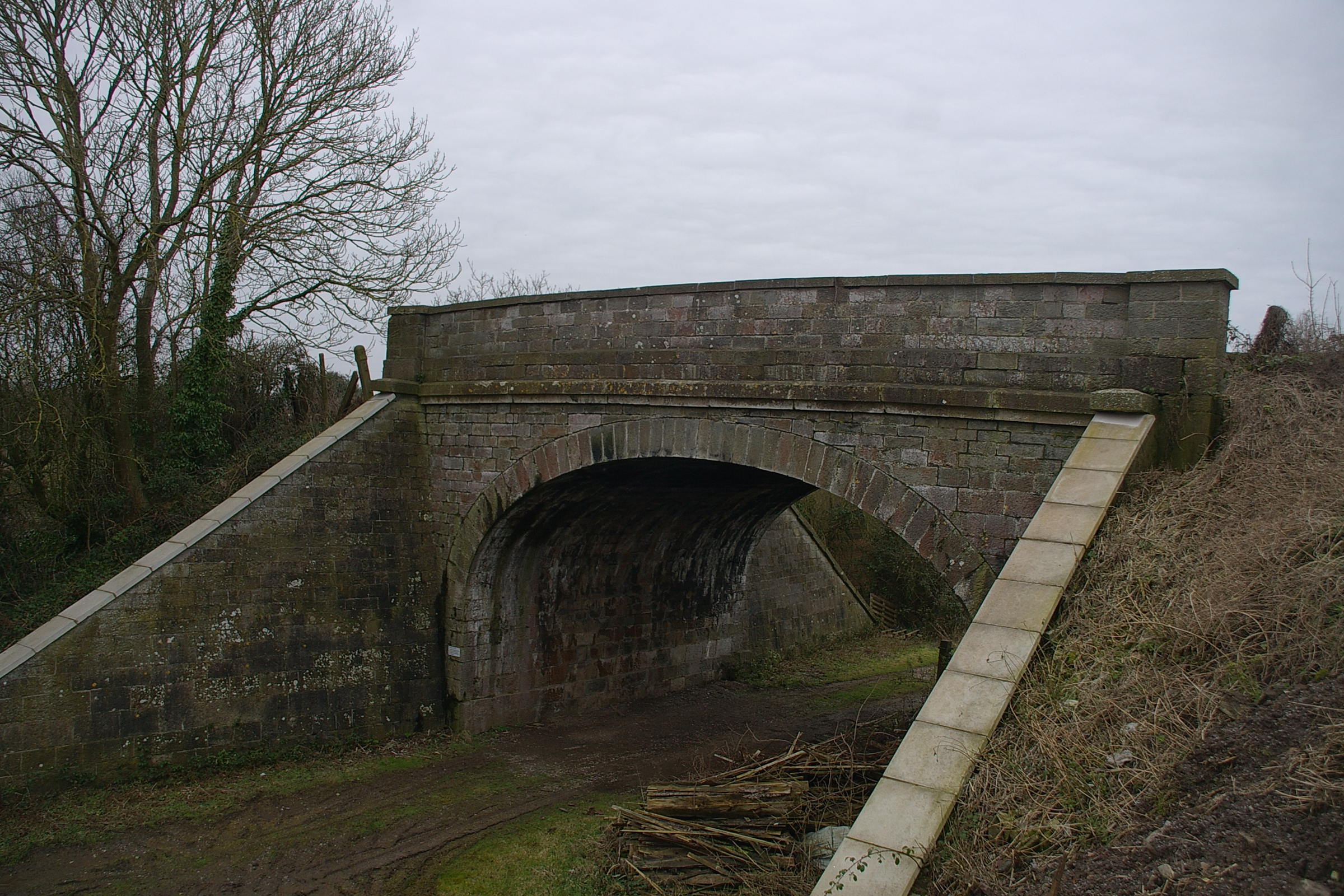
- Clevedon branch line
- Court: House of Lords
- Citations: [1974] UKHL 1, [1974] AC 765

Keywords
- Parliamentary sovereignty

Pickin v British Railways Board [1974] UKHL 1 is a UK constitutional law case, concerning parliamentary sovereignty.

== Facts ==
Pickin claimed that the British Railways Board fraudulently misled Parliament when it passed a local act, the British Railways Act 1968 (c. xxxiv), which abolished a pre-1845 provision which stated that if a railway line were abandoned, the land would vest in the owners of the adjoining land. This provision, in this specific case, came from section 259 of the Bristol and Exeter Railway Act 1836 (6 & 7 Will. 4. c. xxxvi). Pickin was interested in ownership of the railways and so to test the board's right in court, they took advantage of and bought a small piece of land adjoining the railway line in 1969, the Clevedon-Yatton branch line in Somerset. When the railway closed, he claimed he was entitled to a strip of the old line. He argued the board did not comply with standing orders of each House of Parliament that required individual notice to be given to owners affected by private legislation.

== Judgment ==
=== Court of Appeal ===
The Court of Appeal held there was a triable issue. Lord Denning MR said the following:

The rule, as all members of the Bar know is that a charge of fraud is not to be placed on the record without evidence to support it. We are told by Mr. Tackaberry (who appears for Mr. Herrick Collins) that these paragraphs were pleaded by counsel because he had evidence before him to warrant it. He gave us some indications of it today. Suffice it to say that they are such as to warrant the paragraphs being pleaded. I read them as a charge that the board or their advisers consciously misled Parliament and by these means got section 18 enacted as it was. I say nothing as to whether those paragraphs will be proved in fact. But the board say that even though all that is stated in them is true, the paragraphs should be struck out. The master and the judge have so held. They have applied a supposed principle of English law, which was stated by Willes J. in 1871 in Lee v. Bude and Torrington Junction Railway Co. (1871) L.R. 6 C.P. 576 . It had been argued that Parliament was induced by fraudulent recitals to pass the Act which formed the company. Willes J. said, at p. 582:

"I would observe, as to these Acts of Parliament, that they are the law of this land; and we do not sit here as a court of appeal from Parliament. It was once said, - I think in Hobart, - that, if an Act of Parliament were to create a man judge in his own case, the court might disregard it. That dictum, however, stands as a warning, rather than an authority to be followed. We sit here as servants of the Queen and the legislature. Are we to act as regents over what is done by parliament with the consent of the Queen, lords and commons? I deny that any such authority exists. If an Act of Parliament has been obtained improperly, it is for the legislature to correct it by repealing it: but, so long as it exists as law, the courts are bound to obey it."

That passage has been repeatedly quoted in books on constitutional law. Mr. Tackaberry says that that statement – and others like it in the Privy Council – was made without full argument. In particular he says that in all those cases there was no reference to an authority of the House of Lords. It is no doubt an old authority, but it says in terms that if a private Act of Parliament is obtained by fraud, the courts can investigate it. It is M'Kenzie v. Stewart. It was decided in 1752. It came from Scotland. It is fully set out in 9 Mor.Dic. 7443. The Court of Session had by a majority refused to entertain the suggestion that a private Act of Parliament was obtained by fraud. That decision was reversed in the House of Lords by seven to six. There were no reports in those days of the reasons of the House of Lords. But a note was taken of what Lord Hardwicke LC said, at p. 7445:

"The Lord Chancellor, in delivering his opinion, expressed a good deal of indignation at the fraudulent means of obtaining the act; and said, that he never would have consented to such private acts, had he ever entertained a notion that they could be used to cover fraud."

A few years later, Sir William Blackstone in his Commentaries, 14th ed. (1803), Book II, p. 346, speaking of private Acts of Parliament, said:

"A law, thus made, though it binds all parties to the bill, is yet looked upon rather as a private conveyance, than as the solemn act of the legislature. It is not therefore allowed to be a publick, but a mere private statute; it is not printed or published among the other laws of the session; it heath been relieved against, when obtained upon fraudulent suggestions;"

Blackstone refers for that proposition to M'Kenzie v. Stewart.

Counsel for the board submitted to us that those authorities are so old and so out of date that we should not regard them any more. He invited us to give the words of Willes J. their full scope and strike out these two paragraphs in the reply.

I do not think we should pronounce on this point finally or conclusively today. But I must say that there is sufficient material from the lath century for us to allow this plea to remain upon the record. It is quite plain that this action has to go to trial on the issue whether or not this branch line was abandoned before July 26, 1968. We should let it go for trial on the further issue whether this Act of Parliament was improperly obtained. That is a triable issue. It is deserving of investigation by the court. As I have said in the course of the argument, suppose the court were satisfied that this private Act was improperly obtained, it might well be the duty of the court to report that finding to Parliament, so that Parliament itself could take cognisance of it. Parliament could put the matter right, if it thought fit, by passing another Act. In my opinion it is the function of the court to see that the procedure of Parliament itself is not abused and that undue advantage is not taken of it. In so doing the court is not trespassing on the jurisdiction of Parliament itself. It is acting in aid of Parliament, and, I might add, in aid of justice. If it is proved that Parliament was misled, the court can, and should, draw it to the attention of Parliament.

Edmund-Davies LJ and Stephenson LJ agreed.

=== House of Lords ===
The House of Lords held there was no power to disregard an act of Parliament, public or private, or examine proceedings in Parliament to decide whether the act was obtained by irregularity or fraud. It followed that Pickin could not claim that the British Railways Board had fraudulently misled Parliament, so as to vitiate an act. This reversed the judgment of the Court of Appeal.

Lord Morris said the following.

In the courts there may be argument as to the correct interpretation of the enactment: there must be none as to whether it should be on the statute book at all.

...

It must surely be for Parliament to lay down the procedures which are to be followed before a Bill can become an Act. It must be for Parliament to decide whether its decreed procedures have been followed.

== See also ==
- United Kingdom constitutional law
