= Trevor Allan (legal philosopher) =

British legal scholar (born 1955)

Trevor Robert Seaward Allan LLD FBA
- Born: 9 May 1955 (age 71); Luton, England
- Occupation: Legal academic
- Known for: Views on parliamentary sovereignty and rule of law
- Title: Professor of Jurisprudence and Public Law, University of Cambridge

Academic background
- Education: St Albans School
- Alma mater: Worcester College, Oxford

Academic work
- Discipline: Legal academic
- Sub-discipline: constitutional theory, civil liberties, legal and political theory
- Notable works: Law, Liberty and Justice: the legal foundations of British constitutionalism; The Sovereignty of Law: freedom, constitution and common law

Trevor Robert Seaward Allan (born 9 May 1955) is Professor of Jurisprudence and Public Law at the University of Cambridge and a Fellow of Pembroke College. He is known for challenging constitutional orthodoxy in the United Kingdom, particularly in his redefinition of the scope of parliamentary sovereignty.

== Education and career ==
Allan was educated at St Albans School and Worcester College, Oxford, where he received a MA in Jurisprudence and a BCL. He also holds a LLD from Cambridge University. He was called to the London Bar at Middle Temple.

He was a lecturer in law at the University of Nottingham between 1980 and 1985 and joined the University of Cambridge in 1989. He was elected a Fellow of the British Academy in 2016.

His books include Constitutional Justice: A Liberal Theory of the Rule of Law (OUP), Law, Liberty, and Justice: The Legal Foundations of British Constitutionalism (Clarendon Paperback), and the Sovereignty of Law: Freedom, Constitution, and Common Law (OUP).

== Constitutional theory ==
Allan's view is that the rule of law occupies a superior position to parliamentary sovereignty in the constitutional hierarchy. He develops this view in The Sovereignty of Law: Freedom, Constitution and Common Law.
