= HIV Haemophilia Litigation =

Legal action by haemophiliacs infected with HIV through blood products

- Court: Court of Appeal (Civil Division)
- Full case name: AMcG002 v Central Birmingham Health Authority (1),...
- Decided: 20 September 1990
- Citations: [1990] 41 BMLR 171; [1990] 140 NLJR 1349 (CA); [1990] EWCA Civ J0920-1; [1989] E N. 2111

Case history
- Appealed from: High Court of Justice

Court membership
- Judges sitting: Ralph Gibson; Bingham L.JJ.; Sir John Megaw

Keywords
- Haemophilia; Blood products; HIV; AIDS; Contaminated blood; Negligence; Tort; Breach of statutory duty; Class action

The HIV Haemophilia Litigation [1990] 41 BMLR 171, [1990] 140 NLJR 1349 (CA), [1989] E N. 2111, also known as AMcG002, and HHL, was a legal claim by 962 plaintiffs, mainly haemophiliacs (but also their wives, partners and children), who were infected with HIV as a result of having been treated with blood products in the late 1970s and early 1980s. The first central defendants were the then Department of Health, with other defendants being the Licensing Authority of the time, (MCA), the CSM (the Committee on the Safety of Medicines), the CBLA (Central Blood Laboratories Authority), and the regional health authorities of England and Wales. In total, there were 220 defendants in the action.

The litigation commenced around April 1989 and by 7 July 1989, at least 300 plaintiffs had joined the action. Within four months another 300 haemophiliacs had joined the action, however, by this time, (November 1989) 163 haemophiliacs had already developed full-blown AIDS and 107 had died. There was an initial deadline of 2 February 1990 imposed, but this was extended in order to permit 200 haemophiliac children to sign up to the action.

== Principal grounds ==
The plaintiff's principal allegations were that the UK government had been negligent in failing to become sufficient as a country in the supply of blood products at an earlier point, and in delaying the implementation of heat-treatment of clotting factors in order to inactivate HIV. It was further alleged that the defendants did not respond correctly to the AIDS crisis, specifically, in not reacting with urgency to move to banning imported blood products which were derived from paid donors. Another significant ground was breach of duty as provided for in statute, for example, under the National Health Service Act 1977.

== Discovery and public interest immunity ==
On 20 September 1990, the Court of Appeal heard an appeal concerning discovery where an order of 31 July 1990 had been made by Mr Justice Rougier that required the first central defendant, the Department of Health, to surrender some, but not all of 600 files of historic papers spanning 1972 to 1986, on which they were asserting public interest immunity (PII). The appeal had been brought by the plaintiffs and was being considered in conjunction with a cross-appeal by the defendants.

The documents being withheld under public interest fell into a number of categories: submissions and draft submissions to ministers, policy documents, exchanges with ministers, documents revealing the process by which policy decisions were arrived at, documents showing exchanges between senior officials, briefings to ministers, and position papers on the formulation of future policy prepared by civil servants.

Part IV of the Canadian inquiry report by Justice Horace Krever provides a more specific breakdown of the subject matter of the documents which were under consideration during the appeal: documents relating to the drive for self-sufficiency, the allocation of resources, documents on the laboratory (BPL) where blood products were manufactured, on the NBTS, on the screening of donors, on steps to limit the infection with hepatitis, and on heat-treatment of blood products.

No one could doubt the sincerity of the efforts of those in the Department to protect and to assist the plaintiffs as patients in the National Health Service, but on the pleaded case grave errors of judgment were made. Even if there was no grave error of judgment it appears to be not in dispute that there was in fact a failure to protect the plaintiffs from the danger of using blood products, whether imported or supplied in this country, which were infected. (...)

— Ralph Gibson L.J., HIV Haemophiliac Litigation, Court of Appeal, 20 September 1990

The three appellate judges found for the plaintiffs and ordered the PII documents to be disclosed, overturning the ruling of Rougier J of 31 July 1990 and at the same time, the cross-appeal by the Department of Health was dismissed. Lord Justice Bingham recorded in the judgment that he felt "the tragedy was avoidable in the sense that, had different measures been taken in the 1970s and early 1980s, it could, at least in large measure, have been prevented."

== Out-of-court settlement ==
On 26 June 1990, Mr Justice Ognall took the rare initiative of issuing a handwritten note imploring the parties to give anxious consideration to settling the action out of court. He stressed the moral obligation and duty that fell on the UK government toward the HIV-infected haemophiliacs. However, the judge's plea was resisted for several months by the Health Secretary, Mr Kenneth Clarke, and was still being rebutted on 16 October 1990. The Chief Medical Officer, Donald Acheson, was also keen for the government to settle the action. The haemophiliac plaintiffs were developing AIDS and 130 infected haemophiliacs had already died by 9 November 1990. The next month, the action was settled out-of-court by which time the number of plaintiffs on the roll of names (Note: Archaic term for a list of names originating around the time of 1595–1605.) had risen to 1,217.

It was reported on 4 February 2022 in the i newspaper that a Department of Health memo, (Note: National Archives file JA 607/302/1.) unearthed at the National Archives, revealed that senior government officials held the belief in 1995 that the government would have been found negligent and lost the HIV Haemophilia Litigation had the case gone to full trial.

== Deed of undertaking ==
On settlement, the plaintiffs were required to sign a Deed of Undertaking, often referred to as a waiver, undertaking not to pursue any further legal action against the Department of Health or other defendants with respect to infection with any other viruses contracted through contaminated blood products. The waivers effectively served as an indemnity against future legal action against the Department of Health in relation to blood-borne viruses. In 2003, The Guardian reported that the waivers prevented infected haemophiliacs and other plaintiffs from suing specifically if it "was later found that they had hepatitis C as well".

The validity of the waivers has more recently been brought into question in the wording of the group litigation order in Jason Evans & Others [2017], where at 1.4. (Note: Under "Common Issues", paragraph 1.4. states: "Whether any undertakings given by the Claimants or any of them, directly or indirectly, to the Defendant at any time arising out of the HIV Haemophilia Litigation or otherwise are binding upon the Claimants, and in all the circumstances whether it is unconscionable for the Defendant to rely upon such undertaking.") it's suggested that any undertakings given by the claimants in the HIV Haemophilia Litigation may not be binding upon the claimants, due to it now being deemed "unconscionable for the Defendant to rely upon such undertaking".

The decision to implement the waivers was made during the course of the litigation by a high-powered (Note: A & Ors v National Blood Authority & Ors [2001] EWHC QB 446 (26 March 2001) at 11.) government committee, the Advisory Committee on the Virological Safety of Blood (ACVSB). The use of the waivers has been described as controversial by the Haemophilia Society in their first written submission to the Archer Independent Inquiry because it was felt by many haemophiliacs that the government of the time was already aware of the true scale of infection with non-A non-B hepatitis (NANBH) in those who had been treated with blood products.

During the course of a meeting of the AIDS Group of the Haemophilia Centre Directors held on 12 February 1990, a question was posed as to whether hepatitis was likely to become "another item for which haemophiliacs would seek litigation" and whether it was advisable for the Haemophilia Centre Directors to continue to collect data. Later in the same meeting, Dr Simpson confirmed that the Haemophilia Society should not be given hepatitis data.

On 19 May 2022, The Daily Telegraph reported that during the HIV litigation, information had been withheld from litigants and that a requisite undertaking had been inserted into the legal proceedings which served to exclude future legal action if plaintiffs were later found to be infected with hepatitis C.

== Expert witnesses ==
On 10 May 2022, oral evidence was given to the Infected Blood Inquiry by haematologist Dr Andrzej Rejman, a former Senior Medical Officer from March 1989. He admitted that the Department of Health had asked Health Authorities at the time to alter the reports of expert witnesses (Note: According to Chapter 33 of the Krever Inquiry Report, the doctors who had treated haemophiliacs were not named as defendants in the litigation, but were instead asked to become witnesses in support of the government. However, it is also known that certain haemophilia consultants became expert witnesses for the plaintiffs.) called by the defendants in the HIV Haemophilia Litigation. These experts included the late Professor Arthur Bloom, (Note: Professor Arthur Bloom acted as an expert witness for the Health Authorities. He was Personal Chair in haematology in Cardiff in 1976 and chair of the UK Haemophilia Centre Directors Organisation from 1979 to 1985. He was also a senior member of the expert medical advisory panel to the Haemophilia Society and a member of the research and development committee of the Central Blood Laboratories Authority.) and according to Dr Rejman's testimony, this was done in order to tone down certain parts or change the emphasis.

== See also ==
- Advisory Committee on the Virological Safety of Blood
- Contaminated blood scandal in the United Kingdom
