= John Cash (physician) =

Scottish physician

- Born: John David Cash; 3 April 1936
- Died: 8 December 2020 (aged 84)
- Occupation(s): Professor, physician

John David Cash CBE (3 April 1936 – 8 December 2020) was president of the Royal College of Physicians of Edinburgh. He also served as Medical Director at the Scottish National Blood Transfusion Service from 1979 to 1988.

== Career ==
In 1998 Cash published a Government review into the National Blood Authority following a shortage of blood supplies. The review resulted in the sacking of Sir Colin Walker as the then head of the National Blood Authority, shortly after chief executive John Adey was also fired.

Cash gave evidence to the Penrose Inquiry and has been outspoken about Britain's tainted blood scandal in which thousands of haemophiliacs died. Cash was critical of the Inquiry's Final Report, he said it had failed to get to the truth and allowed the responsible executives to avoid giving evidence.

In May 2017 he appeared in BBC Panorama's "Contaminated Blood: The Search for the Truth", stating "If you look at the difference in England and Scotland in terms of the outcomes, you have to conclude that it was not unavoidable, it was avoidable".

In 1974 he was elected a member of the Harveian Society of Edinburgh. In 1992 he was elected a member of the Aesculapian Club.

On the 11 December 2020 the Royal College of Physicians of Edinburgh announced that Cash had died suddenly.
