= Current Law Statutes Annotated =

Current Law Statutes Annotated, published between 1994 and 2004 as Current Law Statutes, contains annotated copies of Acts of the Parliament of the United Kingdom passed since 1947 and Acts of the Scottish Parliament passed since 1999. It is published by Sweet & Maxwell in London and by W Green in Edinburgh. It was formerly also published by Stevens & Sons in London.

In 1982, Glanville Williams said that Current Law Statutes Annotated was "useful" at the first appearance of an Act. It was not, however, regularly kept up to date by reissues or supplements. Williams said this was a "defect". In 1995, Downes called it "the most useful" collection of Acts published yearly.

In 1989, the Law Library Journal said that the annotations in Current Law Statutes Annotated were "not helpful". In 1995, Downes said the commentary on important legislation was "comprehensive".

Publication of Current Law Statutes began in 1948.

Irish Current Law Statutes Annotated is published by Sweet & Maxwell at Dublin. Publication began in 1984. It contains copies of Acts of the Oireachtas proclaimed since the beginning of 1984, in their English dress.

== Current Law Statutes Annotated Reprints ==
Current Law Statutes Annotated Reprints (sometimes called Current Law Statutes Reprints) are annotated texts of individual Acts of Parliament reprinted from the annual volumes of Current Law Statutes Annotated and bound separately. Volumes of reprints include:

- Criminal Law Act 1977, by Edward Griew
- The Housing (Homeless Persons) Act 1977 and the Code of Guidance, by Martin Partington
- The Rent Act 1977 and the Protection from Eviction Act 1977, by Julian T Farrand
- Employment Protection (Consolidation) Act 1978, by Brian Bercusson
- Competition Act 1980, by James Patrick Cunningham and John Tinnion
- Child Care and Foster Children Acts 1980
- British Nationality Act 1981, by Michael David Alan Freeman
- Mental Health Act 1983, by Richard Jones. The Mental Health Act Manual, by the same author, includes an updated version of this reprint.
- Capital Transfer Tax Act 1984, by Ian Ferrier
- Agricultural Holdings Act 1984, by James Muir Watt
- Building Act 1984, by Harold F Baines
- Housing and Building Control Act 1984, by Andrew Arden and Charles Cross
- Police and Criminal Evidence Act 1984, by Michael David Alan Freeman
- Registered Homes Act 1984, by Richard Jones
- Licensed Conveyancing: The New Legislation, by Phillip H Kenny. This book includes the Administration of Justice Act 1985.
- Financial Services Act 1986, by Alan Page and Robert Ferguson
- Income and Corporation Taxes Act 1988, by Barker, Cant, Coombes, Ferrier, Lonsdale and Shock.
- Water Act 1989, by Richard MacRory
