= Advisory Committee on the Virological Safety of Blood =

Defunct UK advisory committee on blood safety

- Abbreviation: ACVSB
- Successor: Microbiological Safety of Blood and Tissues (MSBT)
- Formation: 8 March 1989
- Founder: Dr H. H. Gunson, and DHSS
- Defunct: February 1993
- Type: Advisory
- Purpose: Blood safety, maintaining adequate blood supplies, testing and screening of blood donors
- Key people: Dr E L Harris (chair); Dr J Metters (chair from August 1989)

The Advisory Committee on the Virological Safety of Blood, often abbreviated to ACVSB, was a committee formed in March 1989 in the United Kingdom to devise policy and advise ministers and the Department of Health on the safety of blood with respect to viral infections. The scope of the ACVSB concerned areas of significant policy for the whole of the United Kingdom and operated under the terms of reference: "To advise the Health Departments of the UK on measures to ensure the virological safety of blood, whilst maintaining adequate supplies of appropriate quality for both immediate use and for plasma processing." Of particular emphasis to the remit was the testing of blood donors using surrogate markers for Non-A Non-B hepatitis (NANBH) and later on, HCV-screening of blood donors.

The first meeting took place on 4 April 1989 and was chaired by the (then) Deputy Chief Medical Officer (DCMO), Dr E L Harris. From August 1989, Dr J Metters, also DCMO, sat as chair. The advice to be given by the committee extended to blood products and donor organs as well as blood, and the viral agents to be considered by the group were HIV1 and HIV2, HTLV-I, Non A Non B Hepatitis, CMV, parvovirus and the prion disease Creutzfeldt–Jakob disease (CJD).

== Meetings ==
After the inaugural meeting of 4 April 1989, the advisory committee met a further 13 times, with the fourteenth meeting being held on 29 September 1992. The files and minutes of the committee do not continue beyond February 1993 by which time the ACVSB was considered defunct. Following a memorandum from NHS Management Executive dated 8 February 1993, the ACVSB was replaced by the committee on the Microbiological Safety of Blood and Tissues (MSBT).

Meetings of the ACVSB
Meeting	Date	Topics discussed
First meeting	4 April 1989	Creutzfeldt-Jakob Disease, the EC directive on blood products, HTLV-I testing.
Second meeting	22 May 1989	HTLV-I, Non A Non B hepatitis, Human Growth Hormone, EC directive on blood products, overview on hepatitis, hepatitis B, Non A Non B hepatitis.
Third meeting	3 July 1989	EC directive on blood products, HGH, HTLV-I, Non A Non B hepatitis, action in response to reports of blood/blood product infectivity, effect of gamma irradiation on the Human Immunodeficiency Virus and human coagulation proteins.
Fourth meeting	6 November 1989	Human Growth Hormone, EC directive on blood products, HTLV-I screening, Non A Non B hepatitis, report on UKBTS survey of surrogate testing and Chiron screening.
Fifth meeting	17 January 1990	Human Growth Hormone, EC directive on blood products, HTLV-I screening, Non A Non B hepatitis, combined HIV 1 and HIV2 testing.
Sixth meeting	24 April 1990	EC directive on blood products, HIV 1 and 2 testing, Hepatitis C, anti HCV testing.
Seventh meeting	2 July 1990	Hepatitis C testing, anti-HCV ELISA tests, chimpanzee study of Anti-HCV tested source plasma.
Eighth meeting	21 November 1990	Hepatitis C testing, counselling of HCV positive donors, anti-HBc testing, reinstatement of donors found to be reactive in previously used HIV screening tests, HCV in the community.
Ninth meeting	25 February 1991	Hepatitis C: UKBTS pilot study, NIBSC meeting on Hepatitis C, protocol for HCV Screening and supplementary testing, EC directive on viral safety, EC directive on blood products, hepatitis C: Community transmission, anti-HBc testing of blood donors, hepatitis BsAg confirmatory testing, chronic fatigue syndrome (ME) and blood transfusion, CJD agent/prions in blood donors.
Tenth meeting	21 May 1991	Protocol for hepatitis C screening and supplementary testing, anti-HCV tests on blood donations.
Eleventh meeting	29 October 1991	Hepatitis C, screening of non UK plasma in blood products, results of first HCV testing trials, ALT testing, use of plasma from anti-HBc positive donors with a history of jaundice, re-admittance of donors not confirmed HIV antibody positive, HTLV-I BTS study, possible look-back study.
Twelfth meeting	21 February 1992	Funding anti-HCV screening, chronology of HCV testing, preliminary analysis of HCV testing, evaluation of in-vitro diagnostics by PHLS, non HCV-tested plasma, EC directive on blood products, ALT testing of blood and plasma, HTLV-I testing of blood donations, non-viral infections of blood transfusions including Yersinia, hepatitis A, virally inactivated fresh frozen plasma.
Thirteenth meeting	2 July 1992	Anti-HTLV testing/screening, virus inactivated plasma (VIP), initial screening and alternatives to PCR/RIPA confirmatory tests.
Fourteenth meeting	29 September 1992	Yersinia in blood donors, evaluation of in-vitro diagnostic HCV kits, HCV testing criteria, EC directive on blood products, virally inactivated fresh frozen plasma, HTLV-I testing of blood donations, human pituitary derived gonadotrophins and blood donation, anti hepatitis E testing kits, HbcAb core testing in RTCs and detection of parvovirus B19 in blood products.

== Destruction of files ==
It came to light in 2004 that documentation that fell within the scope of NHS contaminated blood products had gone missing from within the Department of Health and was thought to have been destroyed in the early 1990s. It was claimed by the (then) Minister of State, Lord Warner, that the files in question had been identified by the Department of Health as minutes and background papers of the ACVSB spanning May 1989 to February 1992 and that they were "unfortunately destroyed" having not been properly archived. In May 2006, it was recorded in Hansard that officials became aware of the destruction of the files as early as April 2000, at which point the Department of Health undertook an internal audit. According to a report in The Times of 13 May 2019, there were 17 volumes of papers generated by the advisory committee during the course of its operation. The investigation by the Department's internal auditors conducted in April 2000 found that of the 17 volumes, 14 had been destroyed and only volumes 1-3 survived. A court disclosure list from the Hepatitis C Litigation dated 9 May 2000 also confirms that ACVSB volumes 4-17 of file series "GEB1" were destroyed at various stages between July 1994 and March 1998.

== Key decisions ==
A significant decision made by the committee in November 1990 was to recommend to Ministers that routine anti-HCV screening of blood be introduced. However, the ACVSB decision was not implemented until September 1991 which came under criticism in the Final Report of the Penrose Inquiry for having been delayed by 10 months. In 2001, the role of the ACVSB was referred to in the judgment of A and Others v National Blood Authority in that ministerial approval had been given on 21 January 1991, yet the second generation tests were not introduced in England and Wales until 1 September 1991.

During the HIV Haemophilia Litigation, the ACVSB recommended the use of a waiver, or deed of undertaking, aimed at ensuring that the claimants would not be able to litigate against the government if they were found to have contracted any further viruses. It was recorded in Hansard in 2007 that a number of these deeds of undertaking from 1989 were inadvertently destroyed.

== See also ==
- Contaminated blood scandal in the United Kingdom
- Contaminated haemophilia blood products
- HIV Haemophilia Litigation
- Penrose Inquiry
