= CN v Secretary of State for Health and Social Care =

Judicial review permission appeal challenging non-inclusion of hepatitis B

CN, R. (On the Application Of) v The Secretary of State for Health and Social Care
- Court: Court of Appeal (Civil Division)
- Full case name: The Queen on the application of CN and the Secretary of State for Health and Social Care and the NHS Business Authority
- Decided: 25 January 2022
- Citations: [2022] EWCA Civ 86; [2022] WLR(D) 68, [2022] EWCA Civ 86

Case history
- Prior actions: Permission was initially refused by Spencer J.; permission was refused once more at a hearing by Stacey J.; then Holroyde LJ granted permission to appeal the refusal of Stacey J.
- Appealed from: High Court of Justice

Court membership
- Judges sitting: Sir Geoffrey Vos, Master of the Rolls; Lady Justice King; Lord Justice Dingemans

Case opinions
- Decision by: Sir Geoffrey Vos
- Concurrence: Lady Justice King, Lord Justice Dingemans

Keywords
- Hepatitis B; Contaminated Blood; Blood screening; Permission; Delay; Unreasonableness; Irrationality; Prohibition of discrimination; Article 14; s.15 of the Equality Act 2010; Article 8; Article 1 Protocol 1 (A1P1); Ex gratia; EIBSS; NHSBSA

CN v Secretary of State for Health and Social Care [2022] EWCA Civ 86 was an appeal against the refusal of permission to apply for judicial review to challenge the infected blood support (Note: Some sources state "compensation" scheme. However, EIBSS stands for England Infected Blood Support Scheme and administers payments which have been described as "ex gratia" in nature as opposed to "compensatory".) scheme administered by the NHS Business Services Authority (NHSBSA) for non-inclusion of those infected with chronic Hepatitis B virus. The appeal was based on the grounds that the exclusion of those infected with HBV from the England Infected Blood Support Scheme (EIBSS) was unreasonable and discriminatory, contrary to article 14 when read in conjunction with article 8 and article 1 protocol 1 (A1P1) of the ECHR. The appellant also claimed that there was different treatment and that the failure to include those infected with HBV was unreasonable, and that the original application for review should not have been deemed out of time.

The permission appeal was unanimously dismissed because the application was deemed to be out of time and the claims under article 14 and the one based on unreasonableness and irrationality both failed. The court felt that the support scheme (EIBSS) was a response to a "pressing moral claim" and "an exception to the regime of fault based liability".

== History of 'CN' ==
The appellant, known only as "CN", was infected with the hepatitis B virus which they believe to have contracted around the time of April 1989 at Hammersmith Hospital, where a blood transfusion was required during the course of a bone marrow transplant. Since being infected with HBV, CN experienced a number of serious health issues, including: chronic liver disease, renal failure, a compromised immune system, joint degeneration, Hypertension, short-term memory loss, and breathlessness. CN had been running a successful catering business which had to be relinquished in order to seek medical treatment, and for the last 13 years, CN has had to be sustained by state benefits. In March 1995, CN had initiated litigation in the civil courts with the NHS and the National Blood Authority (NBA) as joint defendants, however the case was eventually discharged following the removal of public funding.

CN claimed to be in a "relevantly similar" position to beneficiaries infected with HIV and HCV who already came within the scope of support offered by the EIBSS, yet the scheme did not include infection with hepatitis B because blood donors were screened for hepatitis B from 1972, which meant that the likelihood of blood being contaminated with hepatitis B in the 1980s was far more remote than for infection with HIV and hepatitis C.

== Detailed grounds ==
The appellant argued the appeal on four grounds:

1. that they were in a relevantly similar position to those infected with HIV and HCV
2. that the different treatment could not be justified by the Secretary of State
3. that it was unreasonable to fail to include those with HBV in the EIBSS scheme
4. that the judge should have extended time for the application to be made

== Judgment ==
In dismissing the appeal, the court stated that it could not be said that CN was in a "relevantly similar position" since the proper comparison would need to be drawn with those who received blood or blood products which had not been screened and as a result were infected with Hepatitis C. Similarly, the other comparator group would be those who acquired HIV who would be unable to claim if the blood or blood products administered to them had been treated.

The Master of the Rolls argued that it was possible for the Secretary of State for Health and Social Care to reasonably justify a differential approach to treatment, especially where "economic policy" and decisions concerning disability were involved. The court maintained that the Secretary of State had to be afforded a broad "ambit of discretion" in setting up an ex gratia scheme such as EIBSS.

Even if there were different treatment of persons in a relevantly similar position, it is not arguable that the Secretary of State is unable to justify that different treatment. A sliding scale of intensity of review is appropriate in this case, which is concerned with judgments of social and economic policy and with disability, but the Secretary of State must nonetheless be given a wide margin of appreciation in creating an ex gratia scheme of this kind.

— Sir Geoffrey Vos, Master of the Rolls, Court of Appeal, 25 January 2022

=== Delay ===
The refusal of permission to apply for judicial review was made on 15 February 2021 by Martin Spencer J on the basis that the application was "manifestly out of time". The non-inclusion of those infected with Hepatitis B was not considered a renewing act but an historic one, which can be pinpointed to the formation and alterations of the support schemes in 2004 and 2017. The court accepted that the limitation clock had started running with the inception of EIBSS on 1 November 2017.

== See also ==
- A and Others v National Blood Authority and Another (Consumer law case involving claimants infected with hepatitis C)
- M.C. and Others v Italy (Right to property case involving bad blood victims)
- R (March) v Secretary of State for Health (UK judicial review quashing a decision on the grounds of material error of fact)
