= Infected blood scandal in the United Kingdom =

Blood contamination scandal and subsequent inquiries in the United Kingdom

Infected blood scandal
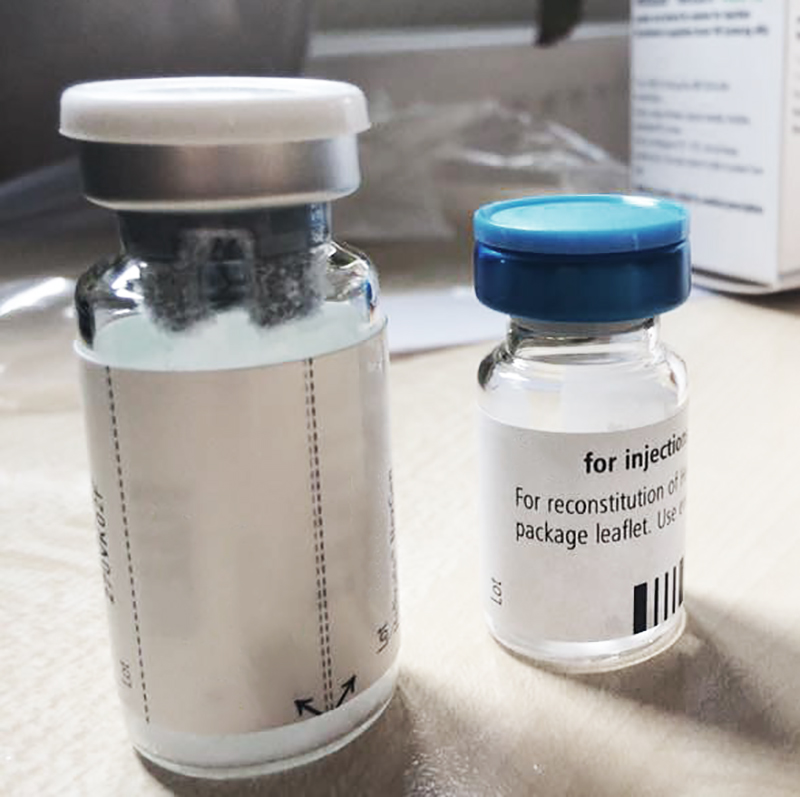
- A bottle of factor VIII, a product used to treat haemophilia
- Date: From the 1970s
- Location: United Kingdom
- Cause: Infected blood and blood products
- Deaths: 3,000+
- Inquiries: Infected Blood Inquiry

From the 1970s to the early 1990s, tens of thousands of people were infected with hepatitis B, hepatitis C and HIV as a result of receiving infected blood or infected clotting factor products in the United Kingdom. Many of the products were imported from the United States, and distributed to patients by the National Health Service. Most recipients had haemophilia, or a bleeding disorder, or had received a blood transfusion following childbirth or surgery. Around 1,250 people with bleeding disorders contracted HIV, an estimate that included approximately 380 children. More than 30,000 patients are estimated to have received contaminated blood, resulting in thousands of deaths. In July 2017, the then Prime Minister Theresa May announced an independent public inquiry into the scandal, after successive governments since the 1980s had refused to do so. The final report was published on 20 May 2024, concluding that the scandal could have been largely avoided and that "doctors, the blood services and successive governments - did not put patient safety first". Patients were knowingly exposed to "unacceptable risks" with the truth hidden from them, including by deliberate concealment.

People with haemophilia were principally infected via the plasma-derived product known as factor VIII, a processed pharmaceutical product sourced from the United States and elsewhere. The creation of these products involved dangerous plasma donation pooling manufacturing processes that led to infected products. Large groups of paid donors were used, as many as 60,000 per batch, and included prisoners and drug addicts. It only required one infected donor to contaminate an entire batch, which would then infect all recipients.

This was at a time when the practice of paying donors for whole blood in the United States had effectively ceased. The UK did not import whole blood from abroad, but it did import large quantities of factor VIII given to those infected. The UK imported these products because it did not produce enough domestically, and efforts to achieve self-sufficiency were inadequately funded. A study published in 1986 showed that 76% of those who received commercial clotting-factor products became infected with HIV, as opposed to none of those who only received the previous treatment – cryoprecipitate.

While then Prime Minister David Cameron apologised on behalf of the British government to those affected, no government, healthcare or pharmaceutical entity in the UK has formally admitted any liability in the scandal. As part of the public inquiry, 3,000 surviving victims were awarded interim compensation payments in August 2022, paid urgently due to the extremely high death rate of survivors.

On 20 May 2024, the six-year-long "Infected Blood Inquiry" was finally reported covering more than 2000 pages and describing the scandal as "the worst treatment disaster in the history of the NHS".

On the following day, 21 May 2024, the Minister for the Cabinet Office, John Glen, announced a new Infected Blood Compensation Authority to administer a new compensation scheme for victims.

== Background ==
Haemophilia is a mostly inherited genetic disorder that impairs the body's ability to clot, a process needed to stop bleeding. This results in people bleeding longer after an injury, easy bruising, and an increased risk of bleeding inside joints or other parts of the body.

Before the development of Factor VIII gene therapy, there was no permanent cure for haemophilia. Treatment and prevention of bleeding episodes is done primarily by replacing the missing blood clotting factors using "synthetic" or "non-human derived" factor products such as recombinant factor VIII. Factor products work by replacing the missing factor proteins, which can take place at home or in hospital. In the 1970s, haemophiliacs began to be treated with "factor concentrates", which were sold as a revolutionary treatment. In the 1980s, it was discovered that many of these concentrates were contaminated by hepatitis viruses and HIV. The concentrates were contaminated as a result of the way plasma was sourced and collected. The creation of these products involved dangerous manufacturing processes. Large groups of paid donors were used, as many as 60,000 per batch, and included prisoners and drug addicts.

Some of the most notorious examples of risky plasma harvesting are those of Luckner Cambronne, who became known as "The Vampire of the Caribbean" for his profiting from the sale of Haitian blood to the West for medical uses, and also Continental Pharma Cryosan Ltd, a company based in Canada that was found guilty of harvesting plasma from the bodies of dead Russians and re-labelling it as originating from Swedish donors.

== Products ==
Plasma donations could be collected using a process called plasmapheresis, before being pooled during the manufacturing process for factor VIII blood products. At the time the scandal occurred, the NHS was purchasing these blood products from commercial manufacturers and producing it themselves via the Blood Products Laboratory:

=== Commercial manufacturers ===
Manufacturers that supplied clotting factor products to the UK during the mid-1970s and 1980s included Abbott (Profilate), Armour Pharmaceuticals (Factorate), Bayer-owned Cutter (Koate), Baxter International-owned Hyland (Hemofil/Interhem), Immuno (Kryobulin) and Speywood (Humanate).

- Abbott: The company was founded in 1888 and its initial public offering was in 1929. They received a license for Profilate in 1975. Abbott divested their Scientific Products Division, which Profilate was a part of, in 1978 to The Green Cross Corporation and Alpha Therapeutic Corporation.
- Armour: In 1977 Armour was purchased by Revlon for $90m. It owned the company until 1985, when it was sold to Rhône-Poulenc which purchased Revlon's drug operation for $690m. Armour and Behringwerke agreed to merge in 1995, and became Centeon. In 1999, Centeon changed its name to Aventis Behring after the parent companies, Rorer and Hoechst AG merged to become Aventis. In 2004, CSL completed its acquisition of Aventis Behring for $925m, today known as CSL Behring.
- Bayer: The company purchased Cutter Laboratories from Miles Laboratories in 1974. In 1978, Bayer also acquired Miles Laboratories. In 2005, a new company called Talecris was created by Cerberus Capital Management and Ampersand, which acquired Bayer's plasma business and assets for $590m. Bayer did not include its recombinant factor VIII "Kogenate" in the sale. "Kogenate" was discontinued in 2022. In 2009, CSL Limited attempted to take over Talecris for $3.1 billion, but was stopped by the Federal Trade Commission which determined that the deal would be illegal. In 2011, Grifols acquired Talecris for $4bn.
- Baxter: They created Travenol Labs in 1949 and acquired Hyland Labs in 1952. In 1993, Baxter was implicated in a lawsuit brought by haemophiliacs infected with HIV in the United States, with company president James Tobin resigning shortly after. In 1996 Baxter settled a lawsuit brought by haemophiliacs in Japan. In 2015, Baxter spun off its haemophilia division to create Baxalta. In 2016, Baxalta merged with Shire plc in a $32bn deal.
- Immuno AG: In 1976 Immuno AG sought "a licence change to allow it to supply a blood product from those paid to donate in the US rather than donors without a financial incentive in Europe". Baxter purchased Immuno AG in 1996 in an effort to keep up with competitors, for $715m.
- Speywood: The company became part of Beaufour Ipsen, with their name later being changed in 1998. Their Chief Scientist, between 1979-1987, provided a statement to the Infected Blood Inquiry in April 2021.

=== Blood Products Laboratory ===
NHS-derived factors were produced by the Blood Products Laboratory (BPL) at Elstree, which manufactured UK blood products. The facility was unsuitable for manufacturing the volume of products needed, there were management problems and it lacked funding. As early as 1974, the Medical Research Council's blood transfusion research committee raised formal concerns that the UK transfusion services were failing to meet the blood product requirements for haemophiliacs. At a March 1979 scientific and technical committee meeting at Elstree, members formally advised the Department of Health that it was "improvident to expect the major BPL plant to continue to function much longer without major breakdown" due to a critical lack of spare production capacity.

During the July 1979 inspection of the facilities, the Medicines Inspectorate recorded that highly compromised plasma was routinely mixed with cleaner batches to "dilute the bug count out", a practice they deemed completely unacceptable. Inspectors noted structural plaster cracking with fragments breaking off into processing rooms, mould growth along the glycol lines, unmonitored cold storage freezers completely lacking temperature recording apparatus, and "openable" windows breaching an aseptic zone designated for sterilising solutions.

Conditions at Elstree continued to degrade over the following years. A follow-up inspection of March 1981 revealed extensive bio-contamination and infrastructure failures throughout the facility. The facility's sterilisation autoclaves had never been validated or commissioned. The inspection recorded that water was dripping from overhead metal panels directly onto active processing areas. Health authorities declared in September 1981 that the plant was "totally unsuitable for the manufacture of sterile products and is incapable of being upgraded to the required standards."

In September 1987, the British Medical Journal published an editorial by John Cash, the National Medical Director of the Scottish National Blood Transfusion Service, who criticised a "remarkable failure of senior civil servants and therefore politicians of all political colours" that led to years of central managerial neglect at BPL Elstree, "made possible by the strict use of crown immunity".

The 2009 Archer Report highlighted the July 1979 Medicines Inspectorate visit to BPL and concluded that if it were a commercial operation, they "would have no hesitation in recommending that manufacture should cease until the facility was upgraded to a minimum acceptable level." Rather than being closed down, the facility was kept open by relying on Crown Immunity to bypass safety regulations. These issues were later highlighted in the House of Lords by Lord Morris of Manchester, who noted from the Archer inquiry findings that "BPL was rescued by Crown Immunity" from an otherwise mandatory legal shutdown.

In 2013 the British government sold an 80% stake in the company to Bain Capital for approximately £230 million. In 2016 BPL was acquired by the Creat Group for £820m; the government stood to receive £164m from its remaining 20% share in BPL.

=== Efficacy and viral inactivation shortfalls ===
The introduction of thermal processing, intended to sanitise plasma pools using early dry-heating protocols, proved highly ineffective against more heat-durable pathogens. This technical shortfall was confirmed by a landmark, international study by Colombo et al. published in The Lancet on 6 July 1985, which tracked the transmission patterns of dry-heated factor VIII concentrates. The trial monitored previously untreated patients, the vast majority of whom were toddlers and infants under the age of fifteen, and revealed that 84% of the participants contracted non-A, non-B hepatitis (hepatitis C) despite utilising products that had undergone commercial heat treatment. These early temperature-related deficiencies failed to achieve complete viral inactivation, resulting in product-related hepatitis transmission incidents and late HIV seroconversions which continued to occur across UK regional cohorts throughout 1987 and 1988 before more intensive, higher-temperature methodologies were universally enforced.

On 21 February 1986, an acute HIV infection in a patient was clinically traced to commercial Armour Pharmaceutical Factorate batch A28306, an un-tested plasma product that had undergone dry-heating at only 60 °C for 30 hours. This specific processing shortfall was subsequently associated with up to twelve cases of late seroconversion across international regional cohorts, with duplicate batches manufactured from the same contaminated source plasma pools actively infecting patients in the United Kingdom, the United States, Holland, and Canada.

The crisis broke in The Guardian in April 1986, when Andrew Veitch revealed that a UK haemophiliac had contracted HIV from heat-treated products, followed ten days later by a front-page exposé, "AIDS threat remains in safe Factor 8", which identified Armour's H.T. Factorate line and exposed months of corporate data concealment before regulators intervened.

On 3 October 1986, Dr Frank Hill, Director of the Birmingham Comprehensive Haemophilia Centre, formally notified Armour that paediatric patients at the Birmingham Children's Hospital had seroconverted to HIV after receiving infusions from batch A28306. Subsequent internal DHSS epidemiological evaluations traced a parallel common vector across the Birmingham cohort to Armour Factorate batch Y83006C, confirming multiple product-related seroconversions before a total market withdrawal was implemented.

== Hepatitis (1974–1984) ==
The dangers of factor concentrates had been raised since their inception. In 1974, American scientist Judith Graham Pool, who previously devised the frozen blood product cryoprecipitate, a safer treatment, described the products as "dangerous" and "unethical", and warned against their use. The World Health Organization also advised the UK not to import blood from countries with a high prevalence of hepatitis, such as the United States.

In April 1975, the New England Journal of Medicine published work by Feinstone et al, that noted that "transfusion-associated hepatitis is caused by other infectious agents, not yet identified". This type of hepatitis later became known as hepatitis C. In May 1975, the World Health Organization passed a widely circulated resolution urging member states to achieve self-sufficiency in blood products through voluntary, non-remunerated donations. The directive called for national legislation to establish regulated blood services and implement explicit safety measures to protect both donors and recipients.

"The general gist of Mr. Gillard's inquiries seems to rest on the premise that the American pharmaceutical industry is sending material to the United Kingdom which is so unsafe as to be unacceptable in the U.S. He was apprised of the following facts, which reflect many of his areas of interest..."

— Dr Theodore Cooper, Letter to UK CMO Dr Henry Yellowlees (25 November 1975)

High-level international correspondence demonstrated that both United States and British health authorities monitored escalating investigative scrutiny by Granada Television regarding the safety vectors of imported plasma supplies. On 25 November 1975, US Assistant Secretary for Health Theodore Cooper sent a formal high-level briefing to UK Chief Medical Officer Dr Henry Yellowlees regarding inquiries by Granada Television journalist Michael Gillard prior to a national television broadcast. Cooper explicitly noted that the investigative inquiries rested on the premise that "the American pharmaceutical industry is sending material to the United Kingdom which is so unsafe as to be unacceptable in the U.S."

On 24 January 1976, amid escalating warnings within the medical establishment regarding the increasingly detailed systemic danger posed by commercial plasma importation, the National Medical Director of the Scottish National Blood Transfusion Service (SNBTS) published an open letter in the British Medical Journal outlining the severe risks of unchecked, increasingly widespread reliance on imported commercial supplies which were "bringing with it a potentially lethal virus into the whole community" in direct reference to hepatitis transmission.

In December 1975, an episode of the World in Action programme highlighted the danger of hepatitis from imported blood products. By the end of 1978, more than 50% of the factor VIII used in England was being imported from abroad. This was because the UK had failed to become self-sufficient in its own supplies.

Internal communications disclosed during the proceedings of the Infected Blood Inquiry demonstrated that medical officers within the DHSS possessed early, explicit awareness regarding the lethal potential of non-A, non-B hepatitis (NANBH). On 15 September 1980, a senior medical officer at the DHSS sent an internal minute warning administrative officials that "90% of all post-transfusion (and blood-product infusion) hepatitis in the USA and elsewhere is caused by non-A, non-B hepatitis viruses" which could not be detected through donor screening. The minute explicitly emphasised that "this form of hepatitis can be rapidly fatal (particularly when acquired by patients with pre-existing liver disease) or can lead to progressive liver damage".

"Although initial production batches may have been tested for infectivity by injecting them into chimpanzees it is unlikely that the manufacturers will be able to guarantee this form of quality control for all future batches. It is therefore very important to find out by studies in human beings to what extent the infectivity of the various concentrates has been reduced. The most clear cut way of doing this is by administering those concentrates to patients requiring treatment who have not been previously exposed to large pool concentrates."

— Dr A.L. Bloom and Dr C.R. Rizza, Circular to all Haemophilia Centre Directors (11 January 1982)

During the public inquiry, an historic circular distributed by the Oxford Haemophilia Centre on behalf of the Hepatitis Working Party, dated 11 January 1982, was disclosed during oral submissions by Lead Counsel Jenni Richards KC. The circular was co-signed by Arthur Bloom and Charles Rizza, and detailed organisational plans to coordinate clinical trials evaluating the transmission vectors of newly introduced, heat-treated commercial factor concentrates. The correspondence noted that because initial safety testing on chimpanzees was insufficient to guarantee quality control for all future production batches, it was important to determine viral transmission rates through "studies in human beings". To establish definitive data, the working party recommended administering these concentrates to a core group of "at risk" individuals, specifically targeting haemophiliac patients who had not been previously exposed to large-pool concentrates.

Technical discussions within regional manufacturing groups highlighted the stark economic and ethical frameworks surrounding these human trial designs. The minutes of a 30 March 1982 meeting of the Factor VIII Study Group in Scotland disclosed that as clinicians evaluated methods to measure product inactivation—such as heat treatment, irradiation, or absorption—the financial constraints of animal testing models were made plain. The panel noted that conducting infectivity studies on chimpanzees would cost "£10,000 per animal test per 6 months" and observed that if human subjects were utilised instead, "it would not be possible to have a 'known positive' control." The minutes went on to record how the compounding technical issues, alongside "the dilemma over the use of chimps (an endangered species), owl monkeys... and humans" became part of a lengthy discussion.

On 17 February 1984, as inter-regional coordination increasingly focused on establishing human trial parameters, the National Medical Director of the Scottish National Blood Transfusion Service (SNBTS) sent a formal briefing to the chair of the UK Haemophilia Centre Directors' Working Party on Hepatitis to evaluate timelines for upcoming wet heat-treated product lines. The correspondence explicitly noted that manufacturing teams were "particularly keen to see part of this product is put into 'virgin haemophiliacs'", a technical clinical trial designation for previously untreated patients, requesting the direct assistance of the working party to coordinate the upcoming clinical studies.

A study published in December 1983 showed that the risk to a haemophiliac of contracting hepatitis C by using untreated commercial clotting-factor products was 100% upon first exposure. Although blood products began to undergo heat treatment in 1984, these early dry-heating regimens suffered from critical temperature-related deficiencies that failed to achieve complete viral inactivation against more heat-durable pathogens.

== HIV (1982–1990) ==
The American Centers for Disease Control and Prevention (CDC) reported in July 1982 that at least three haemophiliacs there had developed Pneumocystis carinii pneumonia. Two had died, and all three had used untreated clotting-factor products, which had all come from different manufacturing batches. In March 1983, the CDC reported on cases of AIDS and the types of people it was impacting, that included haemophilia patients, which they believed blood products were responsible for.

Spence Galbraith, director of the Public Health Laboratory Service Board Communicable Disease Surveillance Centre in England and Wales, sent a paper, titled "Action on AIDS", to Dr Ian Field at the Department of Health and Social Security in London, in May 1983, reporting that a haemophiliac patient in Cardiff had fitted the clinical criteria for AIDS after receiving factor VIII concentrate imported from the United States. The letter noted global epidemiological reports of similar cases in Spain and the United States, leading Galbraith to state: "I have reviewed the literature and come to the conclusion that all blood products made from blood donated in the USA after 1978 should be withdrawn from use until the risk of AIDS transmission by these products has been clarified." He then explained he was enclosing his proposal and concluded that: "I am most surprised that the USA manufacturers of the implicated blood products have not informed their customers of this new hazard. I assume no critical warning has been received in the United Kingdom?". Despite Galbraith's concerns, his recommendations were rejected in July 1983, after being considered by the Committee on the Safety of Medicines.

Behind the scenes, the UK government received direct technical intelligence regarding the transmission vectors and high lethality of the American epidemic. On 28 June 1983, Mike G. Norton, First Secretary (Science) at the British Embassy in Washington, sent a formal briefing to Dr I. T. Field at the Department of Health and Social Security (DHSS) following meetings with the Centres for Disease Control (CDC) and the National Institutes of Health (NIH). The correspondence stated that the US outbreak was following a 'classic exponential growth pattern of a new infectious disease', noting that the mortality rate two years after symptoms was 'still 100%' and that AIDS was a more serious public health matter in terms of deaths than legionnaires' disease and toxic shock syndrome. The accompanying briefing notes explicitly detailed that haemophilia patients were "most at risk" from the virus because commercial Factor VIII concentrates were extracted from large pools of up to 22,000 paid donors, which included individuals "who needed the money to sustain dubious habits".

When responding to a question asked in Parliament, in July 1983, concerning measures the government was taking to prevent the spread of AIDS, Lord Glenarthur responded that "there is no conclusive evidence that AIDS is transmitted by blood or blood products", but suggested that a leaflet may be produced to explain when donations should be avoided. When concerns were raised about importing factor VIII from the United States, he responded that the importations were necessary to "cure" haemophiliacs.

Internal technical records from the same month revealed the operational pressures occurring behind the scenes as manufacturing facilities attempted to adjust to the viral risk and implement viral inactivation measures. On 26 July 1983, Dr R. S. Lane, Director of the Blood Products Laboratory (BPL), issued a progress report noting that manufacturing adaptations for heat-treating concentrates were being advanced with "high priority" to account for the "political sensitivity of AIDS transmission in the UK". The briefing explicitly detailed that to successfully introduce the newly processed batches, the "full co-operation of the haemophilia directors will be required since a non-human primate testing facility is not available to BPL," requiring clinicians to evaluate the infectivity of the products directly within patient groups.

On 2 October 1983, The Mail on Sunday reported on the death of Peter Palmer, a patient under the care of the Bristol Haemophilia Centre who became the first documented individual with haemophilia in the United Kingdom to die of AIDS as a consequence of treatment with contaminated Factor VIII concentrates.

In November 1983, Kenneth Clarke, Secretary of State for Health and Social Care, told Parliament that "there is no conclusive evidence that acquired immune deficiency syndrome (AIDS) is transmitted by blood products", and that haemophilia treatment centres were being given advice about the risks of factor VIII.

1983 MRC Working Party on AIDS

"The special features arising in relation to haemophilia were discussed and the possibility of identifying the role of imported Factor VIII concentrate used for UK patients was outlined... The Working Party sought to identify particular opportunities for research unique or special to the United Kingdom. The fact that the epidemic was lagging some three years behind that in the USA was considered an important factor in enabling the background against which AIDS develops to be delineated... The underlying immunological and virological status of the high risk groups before they encountered the 'AIDS agent' could thus be defined."

— Medical Research Council Working Party on AIDS: Minutes of the First Meeting held on 14 October 1983

On 14 October 1983, the Medical Research Council (MRC) AIDS Working Party convened its inaugural meeting to evaluate the viral risk to the domestic blood supply. An observer for the DHSS was in attendance. The minutes of the session disclosed that the panel sought to identify "opportunities for research unique or special to the United Kingdom," focusing on how the country's transmission timeline lagged approximately three years behind the epidemic in the United States. The working party outlined plans to utilise this latency period to map the underlying immunological and virological baseline profiles of high-risk patient groups before they encountered the active "AIDS agent", rather than recommending immediate restrictions or suspensions on the import of commercial Factor VIII concentrates. The minutes recorded that the working party considered it "inappropriate to recommend a ban on the import of American factor VIII concentrates," concluding that a suspension of imports would cause a severe supply shortage and disrupt ongoing treatment.

Correspondence from Lord Glenarthur in January 1984, said that "It remains the case that there is no conclusive evidence of the transmission of AIDS through blood products, although the circumstantial evidence is strong".

A leaflet "AIDS and how it concerns blood donors" designed for UK blood donors in 1984 stated the answer to the question as to whether AIDS could be transmitted by transfusion of blood or blood products to be "Almost certainly yes".

In December 1984, Kenneth Clarke told parliament that the government was revising the "AIDS and how it concerns blood donors" leaflet to specify which people should not donate, due to being in a high AIDS risk group.

"Of course the maintenance of the life of a haemophiliac is itself expensive, and I am very much afraid that those who are already doomed will generate savings which more than cover the cost of testing blood donations."

— John James, DHSS Finance Division internal circular (5 March 1985)

On 5 March 1985, an internal DHSS finance memo further exposed the stark economic framework of the growing public health emergency, directly weighing the cost implications of introducing universal screening measures alongside data estimating that one-third of the UK haemophilia population had become seropositive. Prompted by an internal warning from official Michael Lloyd that approximately one-third of the UK's estimated 5,000 haemophiliacs were seropositive, with an incidence of 8% annually resulting in up to 40% ultimately developing AIDS, John James calculated that up to 1,200 of this cohort could develop the condition.

Blood donations began to be tested for HIV in October 1985. Media reports highlighted that health officials continued to publicly state "that there was little that could be done," even as universal screening measures for blood donations were delayed until later that year.

In April 1989, the HIV Haemophilia Litigation commenced, marking the first major collective legal action brought against the British government by victims of the contaminated blood scandal. The plaintiffs' case focused on systemic public health failures, asserting that the Department of Health had acted negligently by failing to achieve domestic blood self-sufficiency and by delaying the implementation of viral inactivation using heat treatment. Representing over 1,200 infected individuals, including a significant cohort of child litigants after procedural deadlines were extended to permit 200 haemophiliac children to sign up to the action, the high-profile legal challenge threatened a protracted public disclosure of internal, confidential state documents. During the pre-trial disclosure appeals ordering the release of internal state documents, Lord Justice Bingham recorded in the judgment that "the tragedy was avoidable in the sense that, had different measures been taken in the 1970s and early 1980s, it could, at least in large measure, have been prevented." It culminated in December 1990 with an out-of-court settlement.

== Destroyed-evidence investigation (2000) ==
The Department of Health conducted an internal audit to examine the loss of records relating to hepatitis C litigation. The April 2000 report concluded that "an arbitrary and unjustified decision, most likely taken by an inexperienced member of staff, was responsible for the destruction of a series of files containing the minutes and background papers of the Advisory Committee on the Virological Safety of Blood (ACVSB)".

== The Archer Inquiry (2007-2009) ==
Lord Archer of Sandwell chaired a privately funded independent investigation set up in 2007. The Archer Report was published in 2009 and aimed to uncover the causes of the events that led to thousands of infections and deaths. The inquiry had no legal or official status and was unable to force witnesses to provide evidence or demand the disclosure of documents. Department of Health officials and ministers declined to participate in the inquiry.

It was stated in the inquiry report that transmission of HIV and hepatitis to thousands of haemophiliacs was "a horrific human tragedy" and the report criticised how long the government and scientific authorities took to respond to the dangers of viruses. It was also critical of the amount of time it took England and Wales to become self-sufficient in blood products. In regard to the reliance on importing blood products, where high risk donors were used, the report said that "It is difficult to avoid the conclusion that commercial interests took precedence over public health concerns."

A chapter of the report was dedicated to missing evidence and documents. For example, the ministerial papers of Lord Owen had been destroyed. "We have been unable to ascertain who carried out the destruction of the papers, and who gave the instructions. But the conclusion appears inescapable that some official made a decision which he or she had no authority to make, or that someone was guilty of a serious error of judgement. The consequence is that Lord Owen has done his best to recollect details of events a quarter of a century ago, but both he, and we, have been deprived of the primary sources", Lord Archer reported. Lord Jenkin also voiced his difficulties obtaining documents for the inquiry. Lord Jenkin felt that the destruction of records was deliberate, and done "in order to draw a line under the disaster".

Recommendations from the report included creating a committee to advise the government about the treatment of haemophilia, that haemophilia patients and their partners should be tested for any medical conditions that may have been transmitted to them, improved testing for blood donors, increased support such as prescriptions and counselling, compensation, ensuring that people with haemophilia can get insurance, and that efforts should be made to trace anyone who may have been exposed to infections, that may not be aware that they were infected.

After the report was published, Lord Morris introduced a private members bill, called the Contaminated Blood (Support for Infected and Bereaved Persons) Bill, in order to implement the recommendations of the report, including compensation and support for victims, after the government response to the report was criticised in the Lords. The bill passed through the Lords with widespread support, however it did not progress through the House of Commons.

== Scottish Penrose Inquiry (2008-2015) ==
In 2008, the Scottish government announced a public inquiry into the scandal covering Scotland only, to be chaired by Lord Penrose. The inquiry's terms of reference outlined five deaths that were to be examined, with that subsequently reduced to four deaths. Only one of those victims was a haemophiliac and that person had been infected with hepatitis C in the 1960s as part of their treatment for haemophilia.

Published in 2015, the inquiry concluded that Scottish authorities could not have done more to prevent the infections and made only one recommendation, which was that people in Scotland who received blood transfusions before 1991 should be tested for Hepatitis C, which was accepted by the government. It was described as a whitewash by victims, despite it costing over £12 million) and it failed to apportion any blame, which victims criticised.

The report's failure to address institutional accountability or make substantive recommendations resulted in widespread condemnation on publication day, with devastated campaigners and victims publicly setting fire to copies of the report in the street outside the venue.

== Legal action (2017) ==
In July 2017, a group legal action (Jason Evans & Others v Secretary of State for Health) was brought against the government on behalf of hundreds of people. In September 2017, a court ruling found in favour of the victims, allowing them to launch a High Court action to seek damages.

== Infected Blood Inquiry (2017-2025) ==
Inquiry logo

After years of increasing pressure from campaigners and MPs, Prime Minister Theresa May announced a full UK-wide public inquiry into the scandal in July 2017.

=== Availability of evidence (2018-2019) ===
In June 2018, the Department of Health issued a formal correction regarding the availability of evidence. The Department of Health and Social Care apologised for instances where Ministers had told Parliament that "all documents up to 1995 are available through the National Archives", clarifying that the statement omitted necessary context and only referred to a subset of files previously selected as relevant. In February 2019, it emerged that around 450 files had been taken from the archives by staff from the Department of Health and Social Care, and not returned, sparking concerns among campaigners that the department was attempting a cover-up.

=== Infected Blood Inquiry statistics report (2022) ===
The Infected Blood Inquiry statistics report, published in September 2022, set out to establish the number of people infected and includes David Spiegelhalter among its authors. The report found that around 1,250 people with bleeding disorders were infected with HIV in the UK and that at least a further 2,400 people were infected with Hepatitis C.

The report concluded that around three-quarters of those infected with HIV had died and that at least 700 people infected with Hepatitis C had died. Of the 26,800 people chronically infected with Hepatitis C through blood transfusions, an estimated 8,120 survived for more than 10 years after their transfusion. Circumstances under which people were infected via transfusions are different to factor products. For example, blood for blood transfusion was not imported from the US.

=== Infected Blood Inquiry report (2024) ===
"This disaster was no accident. People put their faith in doctors and in the government to keep them safe and their trust was betrayed... It was unconscionable to treat children with concentrates capable of transmitting serious viruses without explaining those risks clearly to their parents. There were multiple research projects where informed consent for participation was neither sought nor given. That was unethical. It was wrong."

— Sir Brian Langstaff, Chairman's Address at Central Hall Westminster, 20 May 2024

The inquiry report was published in 2024 and highlighted how patients had been exposed to unacceptable risk, with authorities attempting to conceal the scandal whilst victims were repeatedly failed by the NHS, medical professionals and the government. The summary of the report set out how illness, infections and deaths were needlessly caused to people with blood disorders and recipients who received blood transfusions, concluding that clinicians and health services failed those people and how the harm done was exacerbated by how those people were treated by those responsible. The report detailed what occurred at Treloars School, which was a specialist school for children with disabilities hosting an on-site NHS haemophilia centre. The inquiry found the pupils were treated as "objects for research" and used as research subjects in clinical trials without the informed consent of the children or their parents. Out of 122 pupils with haemophilia who attended the school between 1970 and 1987, only around 30 were still alive when the inquiry's final report was published in 2024.

The report detailed how these systematic research paradigms operated on the ground, extensively documenting a May 1979 exchange between Dr John Craske of the Public Health Laboratory Service (PHLS) and Dr Anthony Aronstam, director of the Treloar haemophilia centre. In an outbound letter dated 10 May 1979, Dr Craske requested that clinicians intentionally administer large-pool commercial clotting factor concentrates to mild or previously untreated "virgin" patients during non-urgent procedures, explicitly noting that exposing these low-risk cohorts was "the best way of finding out whether the material is associated with cases of hepatitis." Dr Aronstam, in a written reply of 14 May 1979, rejected the suggestion, stating that he "totally disagree[d] with this concept" and did not wish any of his mild patients "to develop hepatitis in any form," confirming he would maintain a localised policy of using DDAVP or cryoprecipitate instead.

The main recommendation made was for a compensation scheme to be established, with other recommendations including the creation of memorials, ensuring health services learn from failures and to incorporate those lessons into clinical practice, preventing future harm to people, and fostering a safety culture via a duty of candour to dismantle the defensive and dismissive institutional culture. It stated that better safety regulation was required, patient record-keeping systems needed to be upgraded, and measures should be considered to strengthen the accountability of civil servants and ministers. It recommended a number of measures to improve the care of those impacted, including individuals who may be unaware they were exposed to risks, people receiving blood transfusions and haemophilia patients. Recommendations were also made in regards to improving the voice patients have in respect to their care.

This paper trail drew intensive media exposure on 23 August 2015, when a front-page exposé by Caroline Wheeler in the Sunday Express titled "Sick children infected with HIV and used as guinea pigs as NHS said chimps 'too expensive'" laid bare internal administrative records showing that animal infectivity testing models were rejected due to costs of "£10,000 per animal test per 6 months", resulting in the systematic utilisation of untreated paediatric cohorts as human test subjects. Despite this localised hesitation, the Inquiry’s final report concluded that clinical practices across regional centres and special schools continued to treat vulnerable cohorts as "objects for research", routinely administering large-pool commercial concentrates as part of clinical studies on previously untreated patients (PUPs) without having obtained informed parental consent or there having been any disclosure on transmission risks.

The final report's findings of an institutional "defensive culture" and systematic record concealment parallel earlier disclosures concerning the historical manipulation of advisory records. In testimony delivered to the Penrose Inquiry on 23 April 2011, Professor John David Cash disclosed that he resigned from the DHSS Expert Advisory Group on AIDS (EAGA) in 1985 after its chairman, Dr M. E. Abrams, advised him that Cabinet Office officials were actively altering meeting minutes. The 2024 report formally concluded that the response of government over the decades was driven by institutional defensiveness, compounded by "groupthink amongst civil servants and ministers", a lack of transparency and candour, and the repeated use of "indefensible lines to take".

=== Additional Report on Compensation (2025) ===
In July 2025, the inquiry published a further report about the compensation scheme that had been proposed by the government after the inquiry's 2024 report recommendations. The report stated that the inquiry began to be contacted by increasingly concerned victims and their representatives, regarding how the scheme worked, the lack of consultation when creating the scheme, and problems such as delays to receiving payments. The report made a number of additional recommendations, such as changing the type of evidence required to demonstrate severe psychological harm, additional payment awards for people impacted by unethical research and also asked that a cut-off date for bereaved people, who were being denied support payments if a death had occurred after 31 March 2025, be reconsidered.

== Government support ==
Successive governments have been criticised for their actions and responses, limited support schemes and previous refusal to conduct a public inquiry. Some support was provided to selected individuals through charitable trusts on a discretionary basis.

In 1991, the Conservative government made £42 million available to those affected by HIV. In 2017, the Conservatives announced more funds for those with first-stage chronic hepatitis C. This additional money was reportedly to be sourced from funds for other contaminated blood victims, which was criticised. Officials stated that they had made an extra £125 million available, more than any previous government, but critics said this money was simply accounted for as a cost to the NHS, of extending treatments to those with hepatitis C sooner.

In December 2023, an amendment was added to the Victims and Prisoners Bill that would establish a compensation scheme for victims. The Conservative government failed to prevent the amendment in a vote in the House of Commons, despite a three-line whip, in what was seen as a significant blow to the Sunak administration's authority.

In May 2024, Cabinet Office Minister John Glen MP told the House of Commons that the victims of the scandal (or their estates) would receive an interim compensation payment of up to £210,000 within 90 days. On 22 August 2024, regulations for the compensation scheme were laid before the UK Parliament. On 23 August 2024, the government published a policy paper explaining the functioning of the compensation scheme.

After the scheme led to those impacted raising concerns, and the Infected Blood Inquiry making additional recommendations in 2025, the government conducted a 12 week consultation which focused on some of the report's recommendations, before making a number of changes to the scheme, with a fourth set of regulations coming into effect in July 2026, which introduced elements such as a new severity level for those who contracted Hepatitis, additional payments for people infected when they were children and changes to the unethical research award.

== See also ==
- Contaminated blood scandal in France
- Factor 8: The Arkansas Prison Blood Scandal
- HIV trial in Libya after over 400 children were infected with HIV at El-Fatih Children's Hospital in Benghazi, Libya
- M.C. and Others v Italy (right to property case involving bad blood victims)
- Penrose Inquiry, a 2008–2015 inquiry in Scotland into infected blood products
- R (March) v Secretary of State for Health, a 2010 judicial review involving a claimant treated with contaminated blood products
