= Arthur Bloom =

Arthur Bloom may refer to:

- Arthur Bloom (physician) (1930–1992), Welsh physician who focused on haemophilia
- Arthur Bloom (musician), American composer and pianist
