= Geoffrey Vos =

British judge (born 1955)

The Right Honourable Sir Geoffrey Vos
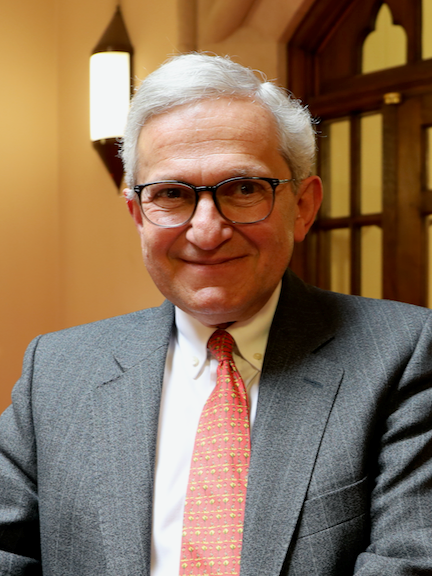
- Vos in 2022

Master of the Rolls
- In office 11 January 2021 – 31 October 2026
- Monarchs: Elizabeth II; Charles III
- Preceded by: Sir Terence Etherton
- Succeeded by: Sir Colin Birss

Chancellor of the High Court
- In office 24 October 2016 – 11 January 2021
- Preceded by: Sir Terence Etherton
- Succeeded by: Sir Julian Flaux

Lord Justice of Appeal
- In office 1 October 2013 – 23 October 2016

Personal details
- Born: 22 April 1955 (age 71) London, England
- Education: Gonville and Caius College, Cambridge

Sir Geoffrey Charles Vos (born 22 April 1955) is a retired judge in England and Wales who served as Master of the Rolls and the Head of Civil Justice from January 2021 to October 2026.

== Early life and education ==
Geoffrey Charles Vos was born on 22 April 1955 to Bernard Vos and Pamela Celeste Rose (née Heilbuth) Vos. He was educated at University College School, London, and Gonville and Caius College, Cambridge.

== Career ==
Vos was called to the bar at Inner Temple in 1977, and practised in commercial and chancery litigation, both domestically and internationally. He took silk in 1993 and served as chair of the Chancery Bar Association from 1999 to 2001 and as chair of the Bar Council in 2007.

=== Judge ===
Sir Geoffrey began his judicial career with appointment as a deputy High Court Judge in 1999. He sat in the Courts of Appeal of Jersey and Guernsey between 2005 and 2009, and in the Court of Appeal of the Cayman Islands between 2008 and 2009. Vos was appointed a High Court Judge in October 2009 and was assigned to the Chancery Division.

Vos was appointed as a Lord Justice of Appeal in 2013. He was President of the European Network of Councils for the Judiciary between 2014 and June 2016. He became Chancellor of the High Court on 24 October 2016.

=== Master of the Rolls ===
Sir Geoffrey Vos was appointed the Master of the Rolls and Head of Civil Justice in England and Wales on 11 January 2021, succeeding Lord Etherton.

In addition to being President of the Court of Appeal's Civil Division, the Master of the Rolls is chair of both the Civil Justice Council and the Civil Procedure Rule Committee. He is chair of the Advisory Council on National Records and Archives and of the Forum on Historical Manuscripts and Academic Research. He is also a member of the LawtechUK Panel and chair of its UK Jurisdiction Taskforce.

In March 2021, Sir Geoffrey disclosed that the Civil Justice Council was "looking at the extent to which litigants should be forced to mediate and if so, in what circumstances". He admitted the idea is "highly controversial".

In April 2021, he called for a greater use of digital technology to accelerate the dispute resolution process. In May 2021, he outlined his vision for digital justice reform in more detail, and the need to reform the overall system, rather than focusing only on the judicial decision-making process. Emphasising the need to focus on the whole picture, he said: "We should not allow the tail, however waggy, to wag the huge dispute resolution dog".

Vos retired from his position as Master of the Rolls and from judicial office on 31 October 2026.

== Affiliations ==
Sir Geoffrey was chairman of the Social Mobility Foundation from 2008 to 2011. He was Treasurer of Lincoln's Inn for 2023, was made an honorary bencher of the King's Inn, Dublin in 2021, and is an honorary fellow of Gonville and Caius College, Cambridge. He was awarded an honorary LLD degree by the University of Hull in January 2023.

He is a member of the Council and Executive of the European Law Institute and of the Steering Group of the Standing International Forum of Commercial Courts.

== Notable decisions ==
Notable judicial decisions of Sir Geoffrey include:

- Singularis Holdings Limited (in liquidation) v Daiwa Capital Markets Europe Limited [2018] EWCA Civ 84 – on the duties of a bank where a person acting fraudulently directs the bank to transfer money out of a company's account.
- Director of the Serious Fraud Office v Eurasian Natural Resources Corp Ltd [2018] EWCA Civ 2006 – on the scope of legal professional privilege.
- Vodafone Ltd v Office of Communications [2020] EWCA Civ 183 – on the unjust enrichment of public authorities.
- R (Officer W80) v Director General of the Independent Office for Police Conduct [2020] EWCA Civ 1301 – on the misconduct of an officer who shot dead a civilian.
- Stanford International Bank Ltd v HSBC Bank Plc [2021] EWCA Civ 535 – on losses sustained by a company in liquidation.
- Broad Idea International Ltd v Convoy Collateral Ltd [2021] UKPC 24 (dissenting) – on the court's power to grant injunctions.
- HRH The Duchess of Sussex v Associated Newspapers Ltd [2021] EWCA Civ 1810 – on claims by the Duchess for misuse of private information and copyright infringements.
- Bell v The Tavistock and Portman NHS Foundation Trust [2021] EWCA Civ 1363[1] – on the prescribing of puberty blockers to under-18s with gender dysphoria.
- Paul v Royal Wolverhampton NHS Trust [2022] EWCA Civ 12 – on the availability of damages for psychiatric injury.
- Barking and Dagenham LBC v Persons Unknown [2022] EWCA Civ 13 – on the granting of final injunctions against persons who were unknown and unidentified.
- R (CN) v Secretary of State for Health and Social Care [2022] EWCA Civ 86 – a refusal to judicially review the infected blood support scheme for non-inclusion of those with chronic hepatitis B.
- R (Counsel General for Wales) v Secretary of State for Business, Energy and Industrial Strategy [2022] EWCA Civ 181 – on the embargo on publication of draft judgments.
- Gemalto Holding BV v Infineon Technologies AG [2022] EWCA Civ 782 – on limitation for cases of discovering deliberately concealed mistakes.
- Barts Health NHS Trust v Dance [2022] EWCA Civ 935 – on end-of-life treatment and the best interests of a child, Archie Battersbee.
- The Executors of HRH Prince Philip, The Duke of Edinburgh (Deceased) v Guardian News and Media [2022] EWCA Civ 1081 – on the sealing of the late Duke's will.
- Belsner v Cam Legal Services Ltd [2022] EWCA Civ 1387 and Karatysz v SGI Legal LLP [2022] EWCA Civ 1388 – on legal costs.
- AG (A Child) v Barnet LBC [2022] EWCA Civ 1505 – on the relationship between diplomatic immunity and article 3 of the European Convention on Human Rights.
- R (Good Law Project) v Prime Minister [2022] EWCA Civ 1580 – on government policy relating to the use of private emails and messaging services when undertaking government business.
- R (Friends of the Earth) v Secretary of State for International Trade [2023] EWCA Civ 14 – whether the UK government acted in breach of the Paris Agreement in financing a liquefied natural gas project in Mozambique.
- Rabot v Hassam; Briggs v Laditan [2023] EWCA Civ 19 (dissenting) – on damages for whiplash injuries.

== Personal life ==
Sir Geoffrey married Vivien Mary Fieldhouse, in 1984.

Sir Geoffrey is a member of the Oxford and Cambridge Club and an honorary member of the Worcestershire Golf Club. He is a member of both the Liberal Jewish Synagogue St John's Wood and the Herefordshire Jewish community.
