= M.C. and Others v Italy =

2013 ECHR case involving charges on property

Decided 3 September 2013
- Full case name: Affaire M. C. et Autres c. Italie
- Case: 5376/11
- ECLI: http://hudoc.echr.coe.int/fre?i=001-126137
- Chamber: Deuxième Section
- Language of proceedings: French
- Nationality of parties: Italian

Ruling
- The Italian Government infringed the principle of the rule of law and the right to a fair hearing. The court required Italy to pay the supplementary compensation allowance with annual uprating.

Court composition
- President; Danutė Jočienė
- Judge Rapporteur; Stanley Naismith
- Judges: Guido Raimondi; Peer Lorenzen; Dragoljub Popović; Işıl Karakaş; Nebojša Vučinić; Paulo Pinto de Albuquerque

Instruments cited
- Legislative Decree No. 78/2010

Keywords
- Abnormal and exorbitant charge; Adjusted supplementary allowances; Annual uprating; Damage to property; Indennità integrativa speciale (IIS); Permanent damage; Violation of Article 1 of Protocol No. 1 (A1P1); Violation of Article 14

M.C. and Others v Italy (also known as Affaire M. C. et Autres c. Italie) is a case decided by the European Court of Human Rights (ECHR) on 3 September 2013 in which Article 1 of Protocol 1 (A1P1) was engaged due to the applicants not being afforded annual uprating which the court deemed damage to their property of a disproportionate character in the form of an exorbitant charge. The Strasbourg ruling sets an important precedent for higher monthly compensation payments to be paid to the 60,000 or so victims of contaminated blood transfusions in Italy. The effect of this ruling increased payments to the applicants by 40%.

== Background ==
The applicants were 162 Italian nationals who had either received blood transfusions or blood products contaminated with various blood-borne viruses. The applicants, all of whom were given anonymity, complained that part of the compensation they received because of the contamination was not being afforded an annual reassessment according to the inflation rate. Following transfusions or the administration of blood derivatives, the applicants were infected with the human immunodeficiency virus (HIV), and/or hepatitis B and/or hepatitis C. Forty of the applicants or their relatives had haemophilia, a condition that requires frequent infusions of blood products. The other applicants were infected through blood transfusions carried out during hospital treatment.

A domestic legislative decree had been adopted in Italy in 2010 which led to a considerable loss in value of the compensation awarded to the applicants for their permanent damage.

The compensation was to include a supplementary indemnity, in Italian "indennità integrativa speciale", abbreviated to "IIS". This indemnity component (IIS) was to be subject to reassessment based on the annual rate of inflation and was intended to prevent or reduce the effects of currency devaluation. However, the Italian government made interventions as to the re-assessment of this supplementary allowance (the IIS) as they believed that it was not possible to uprate the amount in line with inflation. In the absence of the annual revaluation, the monetary value of the IIS was fated to gradually decrease. In addition, the IIS was thought to represent between 90% and 95% of the total amount of the compensation. The applicants presented accountancy expertise demonstrating that those who had a right to the revaluation of the IIS were being deprived every month of around 200 euros.

=== Applicant's situation ===
During the case, the health of several of the applicants deteriorated due to the viruses with which they were infected. The infection with contaminated blood and blood products had led to some developing liver cirrhosis, liver cancer, or a combination of several pathologies, in some, both AIDS and hepatitis. In some cases, this was often accompanied by the underlying condition of haemophilia. One applicant had a nervous breakdown leading to several suicide attempts.

From the point the case application had been communicated to the Italian government, six applicants died. Their heirs were then established in the Court proceedings.

The applicants provided medical certificates and expert medical reports showing the reduced life expectancy of people infected with the hepatitis virus and HIV. The expert evidence made out a strict link between the applicant's prognosis of survival and the beneficial effect of the compensation allowances in question.

The Court considered that they were obligated to take the pathologies of the applicants into account, particularly how during the proceedings, six of them had died. The judges also attached particular importance to the fact that the annual reassessment (the IIS) represented more than 90% of the total amount of the compensation paid to the applicants.

== Relevant law ==
Under Law No. 210/1992, the applicants had already received compensation from the Italian Ministry of Health for the permanent damage they sustained as a result of their contamination.

Law No. 210/1992 stated that additional compensation, "indennizzo ulteriore", is to be granted to persons who have suffered damage as a result of compulsory vaccinations and that this additional compensation should be subject to an annual reassessment based on the rate of inflation. Since February 1992, the entitlement under Law No. 210/1992 to compensation from the state for anyone who had been left with permanent injury from compulsory vaccinations had been extended to those who had been infected with HIV as a result of blood products and/or those with irreversible damage due to post-transfusion hepatitis. The court was unable to identify any disparity in treatment between those who had been affected by post-transfusion hepatitis and those who had sustained permanent damage as a result of compulsory vaccinations.

The applicant's arguments relied on various articles and protocols of the European Convention on Human Rights as follows: Article 6 section 1, Article 13, Article 14, Article 1 of Protocol No. 1 and Article 1 of Protocol No. 12.

== Judgment ==
The judges decided unanimously that the applicants had suffered damage to their property of a disproportionate character due to the adoption by the Italian government of Legislative Decree No. 78/2010. This decree placed an "abnormal and exorbitant charge" ("charge anormale et exorbitante") on the applicants, and in the opinion of the court upset the fair balance between the demands of the general interest and the safeguarding of individual's fundamental rights.

The judges were unanimous in finding that there had been a violation of Article 14 of the Convention along with a declaration that the application was admissible under A1P1 (Article 1 of Protocol No. 1).

By way of remedy, the Italian government was required by the ECHR to set, within 6 months, a time–limit by which the State must undertake to guarantee the payment of the re–assessed IIS to any applicant entitled to the compensation under Law no. 210/1992 and that the payments should be back-dated to the point from which it had been granted to them. The increase would also have to be paid to everyone in a comparable situation where the adjusted supplementary allowances had not been paid.

=== Pilot judgment ===
Having regard to the number of people in Italy who were potentially affected, the Court decided in consequence to apply the pilot judgment procedure, and also noted the urgent need to provide the persons concerned appropriate redress at national level.

— M. C. and Others v Italy (2013)

This ruling was one of a limited number of pilot judgments made by the Court. The potential number of people in Italy who were likely to be systemically affected by the same issue was taken into consideration by the Court and by way of consequence chose to implement the pilot judgment procedure. The respondent state was required to address not only the applicant case but all similar cases. The Court "also noted the urgent need to provide the persons concerned appropriate redress at national level."

=== Just satisfaction ===
In the main proceedings of 3 September 2013, the question of the application of Article 41 of the Convention was reserved and held over in its entirety since the court believed it was not ready to be decided.

On 26 May 2016, the same 162 applicants returned to the ECHR to have their claims concerning "just satisfaction" under Article 41 of the Convention considered. In relation to the question of the application of Article 41, all the applications were struck out of the list because the court had been informed of a "friendly settlement" which had been reached between the Italian Government and the applicants.

== See also ==
- A and Others v National Blood Authority and Another (UK Consumer law case involving claimants infected with hepatitis C)
- CN v Secretary of State for Health and Social Care (Permission appeal challenging non-inclusion of people with hepatitis B)
- Contaminated blood scandal in the United Kingdom
- Contaminated haemophilia blood products (mentions contaminated blood in Italy)
- R (March) v Secretary of State for Health, 2010 judicial review by a claimant treated with contaminated blood products.
