= Arthur Bloom (physician) =

Consultant haematologist (1930–1992)

Arthur Leslie Bloom (1930–1992) was a Welsh physician focused on the field of Haemophilia.

== Career ==
In the 1970s/1980's, he was Chairman of the Haemophilia Centre Directors Organisation.

Bloom served as Director of the Cardiff Haemophilia Centre and had held important positions with the World Federation of Haemophilia.

He was also a senior member of The Haemophilia Society's medical advisory panel and a member of the Central Blood Laboratories Authority (CBLA).

== Personal life and death ==
Bloom died at the age of 62 on Thursday 12 November 1992.

== Controversy ==
Being centrally placed, Bloom was one of the key figures in what would become known as the Tainted Blood Scandal, in which a large number of people were infected with hepatitis C and HIV, as a result of receiving contaminated blood or contaminated clotting factor products. Some of his actions were highlighted in the Penrose Inquiry.

In 2017, an episode of BBC Panorama alleged that Bloom had knowingly downplayed the risks of contracting HIV from Factor VIII blood products. In the following year the allegation was repeated in The Guardian.

On 15 April 2023, The Lancet reported that families testifying at the Infected Blood Inquiry had named Bloom multiple times alleging that he had failed to inform patients of the risks involved with their treatment.

On 20 May 2024, the Inquiry's official report named Bloom as having made critical errors in the care of patients.

== Posthumous ==
The Arthur Bloom Haemophilia Centre which is a part of The University Hospital of Wales was named after him and provides services for people with haemophilia, HIV/AIDS, & hepatitis C and their families.

In August 2019, following a campaign by the families of contaminated blood victims, a bust of the late professor was removed from the haemophilia centre of the University Hospital of Wales. According to The Times, the Cardiff and Vale University Health Board removed the bust so as to "not cause any additional stress or upset to people visiting the centre".
