= Creat Group =

The Creat Group is a Chinese investment firm based in Beijing incorporated in 1992. It has expertise in the plasma industry and invests in healthcare and pharmaceuticals, manufacturing, energy, finance, natural resources, and real estate.

It bought Bio Products Laboratory from Bain Capital in May 2016 for £820 million. In 2017 it took over Biotest, the German blood plasma products maker. It holds a stake in Shanghai RAAS Blood Products.

The company obtains blood plasma from patients in the US and uses it to derive treatments in labs in Elstree.

Iain Duncan Smith referenced the company in 2020 when he complained about "the insertion of Chinese influence in all sorts of areas". BPL issued a statement saying “Since the acquisition, Creat has invested over £100 million in enhancing processes, talent and equipment to support the development of BPL Ltd into one of the world’s leading suppliers of plasma-derived therapies.”
