= Martin Partington =

British academic (born 1944)

Thomas Martin Partington, CBE, KC (Hon), FAcSS (born 5 March 1944) is a British retired legal scholar and barrister. He is Emeritus professor of Law at the University of Bristol.

He has over 45 years' experience as a law teacher, researcher, and writer on a wide variety of legal subjects (including administrative justice, legal education, and the English legal system), a (part-time) legal practitioner, legal policy adviser, and a law reformer. He taught at the Universities of Bristol, Warwick, the London School of Economics, and Brunel University.

He was associated with a wide range of bodies and institutions including, at different stages in his career, and for different lengths of time: the Hillfields Advice Centre in Coventry; the Legal Action Group; the Training Committee of the Institute of Housing; the Management Committees of Citizens' Advice Bureaux in Coventry, Paddington, and Uxbridge; the Education Committee of the Law Society; the Lord Chancellor's Advisory Committee on Legal Aid; the Independent Tribunal Service for Social Security Appeal Tribunals; the Judicial Studies Board (both the main Board and its Tribunals Committee); the Council on Tribunals; the Civil Justice Council (and its sub-committee on Alternative Dispute Resolution); the Committee of Heads of University Law schools; the Socio-Legal Studies Association; and the Socio-Legal Research Users' Forum.

For a number of years he was Training Adviser to the then President of Social Security Appeal Tribunals and also sat as a part-time Social Security Tribunals chairman.

He acted as an expert adviser to the Council of Europe, examining Alternatives to Litigation in Disputes between the Individual and the State. In May 2000, he was appointed expert consultee to the Review of Tribunals, set up by the Lord Chancellor and chaired by Sir Andrew Leggatt. He was a member of the Gaymer Review of Industrial Tribunals, 2002.

From 2001 to 2005, he was a Law Commissioner for England and Wales; he was retained as a Special Consultant to the Commission from 2006 to 2008.

He is currently a member of the Executive Board of JUSTICE and of the Civil Justice Councilworking party on housing dispute resolution. He chairs the Board of the Dispute Service, a company under contract with government to provide tenancy deposit protection and dispute resolution.

== Honours ==
In 2002 he was appointed CBE; in 2006 he was elected as a Bencher of Middle Temple; in 2008 he was appointed QC (Hon). In 2015 he was elected a Fellow of the Academy of Social Sciences, and awarded the Socio-Legal Studies Association's prize for Contributions to the Socio-Legal Community.

== Bibliography ==
- Landlord and Tenant: Cases, Materials and Text (Weidenfeld & Nicolson, 1975; 2nd ed. 1980.)
- Taxing the Brain Drain, Vol.I. "A Proposal" (ed. with J Bhagwati) (North-Holland, 1976)
- Welfare Rights: A Bibliography on Law and the Poor, 1970– 1975 (Frances Pinter, 1976) (with John Hull and Susan Knight)
- Claim in Time: A Study of the Time-Limit Rules for Claiming Social Security Benefits (Frances Pinter, 1978) (2nd ed., published by Legal Action Group, 1989; 3rd ed. 1994)
- Welfare Law and Policy (ed. with Jeffrey Jowell) (Frances Pinter, 1979)
- Quiet Enjoyment (LAG, 1980) (1st ed. 1980 – 6th ed. 2002) (with Andrew Arden QC)
- Housing Law (Sweet & Maxwell, 1983) (with Andrew Arden)
- Bibliography of Social Security Law (Mansell, 1986) (with P. O'Higgins)
- Housing Law, Cases Materials and Commentary (1991, Sweet and Maxwell) (with J Hill)
- Housing Law (2nd ed., 1994, Sweet and Maxwell) (further updating releases annually) (with A Arden QC and C Hunter)
- Council on Tribunals Annual Reports: Annotated Index, 1959–1993 (1st ed. 1994, University of Bristol) (with M Chapman, and M Fletcher)
- Administrative Justice: A Working Bibliography (1st ed, 1996, University of Bristol) (with M Chapman, M Harris, and M Fletcher)
- “United Kingdom” in International Encyclopedia of Laws; Social Security (Kluwer Law International, 1st ed. 1998 – 4th ed. April 2012)
- Administrative Justice in the 21st Century (Hart Publishers, 1999) (with Michael Harris)
- English Legal System: An Introduction to the (1st ed., Oxford UP, 2000 – 11th ed., Oxford UP, 2016)
- Law in the real World: the Nuffield Inquiry on Empirical Research on Law (London, Nuffield Foundation, 2006) (with Hazel Genn and Sally Wheeler)
- Law's Reality: Case Studies in Empirical Research on Law (Editor) (Wiley-Blackwell, 2008) Special Research Issue of the Journal of Law and Society
- Halsbury’s Laws of England Legal aid Volume 65 (Consulting Editor) (2008)
- Halsbury’ Laws of England Courts and Tribunals Volume 24 (Joint Consulting Editor) (2010)
- The Development of Professional Legal and Judicial Education in Qatar, (2012) Qatar International Court and Dispute Resolution Centre, Doha) (with Chloë Smythe)
- Developing Professional Legal Education in Qatar, (Pre-consultation paper and questionnaire) (2013) Qatar International Court and Dispute Resolution Centre, Doha) (with Chloë Smythe)
