= Jason Evans (campaigner) =

British infected blood campaigner

- Born: 1989; Coventry, England
- Occupation: Campaigner
- Known for: Campaigning on the infected blood scandal
- Awards: SMK Campaigner of the Year (2023); Pride of Britain Special Recognition (2024; joint)

Jason Evans (born 1989) is a British campaigner whose work helped to secure the Infected Blood Inquiry into the infected blood scandal in the United Kingdom. He founded the campaign group Factor 8 in 2016 and became the lead claimant in the Contaminated Blood Products Group Litigation, Jason Evans & Others v Secretary of State for Health.

His archival and freedom of information research into the scandal has been reported by national UK media and featured in the ITV Exposure documentary In Cold Blood. He proposed a compensation framework exercise before the Infected Blood Inquiry concluded and campaigned for the study subsequently led by Sir Robert Francis KC.

Evans was awarded Campaigner of the Year by the Sheila McKechnie Foundation in 2023 and was a joint recipient of a Pride of Britain Special Recognition Award in 2024.

Since 2025, Evans has worked as a user consultant at the Infected Blood Compensation Authority (IBCA).

== Background ==
Evans's father, Jonathan Evans, had haemophilia and was infected with HIV and hepatitis C after receiving contaminated Factor VIII blood products. He died in 1993 at the age of 31, when Evans was four years old.

When Evans later sought his father's medical records, he was told they had disappeared, prompting him to connect with other affected families who reported similar missing files and begin archival research into the scandal. He established Factor 8 in 2016 as a campaign group for people infected and affected by contaminated blood products.

== Campaigning and legal action ==
In May 2017, The Independent reported that Evans was bringing legal action against the government alleging negligence in relation to his father's infection and was calling for a public inquiry into the infected blood scandal.

Evans met representatives of Collins Solicitors at an event organised by Andy Burnham in Parliament in January 2017. He subsequently supplied the firm with documentary evidence and became a client. Other affected people joined the action, and the firm applied for a Group Litigation Order in July 2017. The group litigation application and evidence concerning officials' knowledge of infection risks featured on the front page of the Daily Mail on 4 July 2017. The Infected Blood Inquiry's final report subsequently identified this coverage among the developments preceding the government's decision to establish an inquiry, recording that recent media reports had increased pressure on ministers.

On 10 July 2017, Diana Johnson cited the Daily Mail revelations and The Sunday Times coverage of a joint letter from the leaders of six non-government parties when securing an emergency Commons debate on calls for a public inquiry.

The government announced the inquiry on 11 July 2017. During the Commons debate that day, Johnson described Evans as "instrumental in generating recent news coverage", referring to the Daily Mail article and other reporting. Confirming the inquiry, health minister Philip Dunne cited reports of new evidence, allegations of potential criminality and concerns that previous investigations had not provided sufficient answers.

In 2017, the High Court made a Group Litigation Order in Jason Evans & Others v Secretary of State for Health, establishing a register of claims in the Contaminated Blood Products Litigation, in which Evans and other affected individuals and bereaved relatives sued the Department of Health for misfeasance in public office. The litigation was subsequently placed on hold pending the outcome of the Infected Blood Inquiry.

== Research and the Infected Blood Inquiry ==
Evans conducted archival and freedom of information research into government handling of contaminated blood and blood products. In October 2017, Sky News reported on Cabinet papers unearthed by Evans concerning the government's historical response to the scandal.

In February 2019, the chair of the Infected Blood Inquiry, Sir Brian Langstaff, publicly thanked Evans for identifying that NHS England had not circulated the inquiry's request to preserve relevant documents.

In September 2020, The Guardian reported on his attempts to obtain Treasury records relating to contaminated blood. That month, Evans's research and his family's experience featured in the ITV Exposure documentary In Cold Blood.

In June 2021, The Guardian reported on documents located by Evans at the National Archives concerning government knowledge of the possible transmission of AIDS through blood products in 1983. Evans gave oral evidence to the Infected Blood Inquiry on 11 June 2021 and was a core participant in the inquiry.

== Compensation campaigning and later work ==
At an Infected Blood Roundtable meeting at the Cabinet Office on 28 January 2020, Evans proposed that work should begin on a compensation framework before the inquiry concluded. The government initially decided to wait for the inquiry to finish. In evidence to the inquiry in July 2023, former Paymaster General Penny Mordaunt confirmed that she had taken up the proposal after her appointment in February 2020.

Following campaigning by Evans and Factor 8, the government announced on 25 March 2021 that it would commission an independent compensation framework study. On 20 May 2021, it announced the appointment of Sir Robert Francis to undertake the study. His report, published on 7 June 2022, recommended a compensation scheme for eligible infected and affected people, alongside immediate interim payments of at least £100,000 to eligible infected people through the existing support schemes.

In 2022, Evans criticised the exclusion of some bereaved relatives from interim compensation payments. On 24 July 2023, he joined a delegation of bereaved relatives delivering a letter to 10 Downing Street, calling for the establishment of a full compensation scheme and the extension of interim payments to bereaved parents and children.

Writing for LBC in December 2023, Evans described lobbying MPs during the week before a Commons vote on compensation and encouraging other people affected by the scandal to do the same. On 4 December, MPs approved New Clause 27 to the Victims and Prisoners Bill, tabled by Diana Johnson, by 246 votes to 242, defeating Rishi Sunak's government by four votes. The amendment required ministers to establish a body to administer compensation within three months of the Bill becoming law.

The following day, Evans led a demonstration in Westminster calling for implementation of the inquiry's compensation recommendations and delivered a letter to Downing Street with MPs.

In February 2024, Evans continued seeking disclosure of government correspondence about compensation through freedom of information requests, following the Department of Health and Social Care's appeal against a decision requiring disclosure. During the House of Lords debate on the Victims and Prisoners Bill on 26 February, Baroness Featherstone thanked Evans for his campaigning while supporting amendments concerning compensation.

The Bill completed its passage during the parliamentary wash-up before the 2024 general election and received royal assent on 24 May as the Victims and Prisoners Act 2024. The Act established the Infected Blood Compensation Authority (IBCA) and required the government to establish a compensation scheme by regulations within three months. The Autumn Budget 2024 allocated £11.8 billion, approximately £12 billion, for infected blood compensation. In 2025, the Paymaster General described it as the largest compensation scheme in British history.

Following his campaigning for compensation through Factor 8, Evans joined the authority responsible for administering the scheme. IBCA announced his appointment as a user consultant in January 2025. His role includes advising on the design and development of the compensation service.

Evans's memoir, A Son Never Forgets: Exposing the Infected Blood Scandal, is an account of his investigation and campaigning. It is scheduled for publication by Biteback Publishing on 26 November 2026.

== Recognition ==
In Cold Blood, the ITV Exposure documentary featuring Evans's campaigning, won the International Emmy Award for Current Affairs in 2021.

In 2023, Evans received the Sheila McKechnie Foundation's Campaigner of the Year award for his work on the infected blood scandal.

In 2024, Evans was a joint recipient of a Special Recognition Award at the Pride of Britain Awards for campaigning on behalf of people infected and affected by contaminated blood.

On 4 November 2025, Baroness Anderson of Stoke-on-Trent commended Evans and IBCA's other user consultants in the House of Lords for their work in helping the authority respond to the needs of people applying for compensation.
