= Infected Blood Compensation Scheme Regulations 2024 =

Regulations to establish a compensation payment scheme

- Statutory Instrument
- Parliament of the United Kingdom
- Citation: SI 2024/872
- Introduced by: Nick Thomas-Symonds, Minister for the Cabinet Office
- Territorial extent: UK-wide

Dates
- Made: 22 August 2024
- Laid before Parliament: 23 August 2024
- Commencement: 23 August 2024

Other legislation
- Made under: Victims and Prisoners Act 2024
- Revoked by: Infected Blood Compensation Scheme Regulations 2025

Status: Revoked

Text of statute as originally enacted

The Infected Blood Compensation Scheme Regulations 2024 (SI 2024/872) were a statutory instrument (SI) of the United Kingdom Parliament that established the initial framework for a compensation payment scheme for victims of the infected blood scandal as stipulated in the Victims and Prisoners Act 2024.

The regulations enact a compensation scheme to make payments via the "core route" to both the living infected and deceased infected. Eligibility is defined within Part 3 of the regulations as someone living or deceased "who has received NHS treatment, or armed forces treatment overseas, with blood, blood products or tissue known to be capable of transmitting HIV, hepatitis C, or hepatitis B".

A second phase of regulations will be made to enhance this statutory instrument and will expand the scope to cover eligible affected applicants. The next tranche will also deal with legislating for the supplementary route in relation to the claims of the infected and affected communities, depending on their circumstances.

== Core route ==
The core route provides for set tariffs with predefined severity levels in relation to infection with Hepatitis B and Hepatitis C. This route offers the option of receiving compensation as an overall lump sum, or as monthly payments, with further options as to the frequency of the payments over set periods of either 5, 10 or 25 years. This option will attract CPI uprating as a way of offsetting any disadvantage caused by choosing to take the compensation as periodic payments.

Part 4, Chapter 2, makes provision for the following series of awards under the core route:

- Injury impact award (under ¶14)
- Social impact award (under ¶15)
- Autonomy award (under ¶16)
- Basic financial loss award for eligible infected persons (under ¶17)
- Additional financial loss award (under ¶18-20)
- Care award (under ¶21)

In order for an eligible infected person to receive their award under the core route, the IBCA (Note: Part 3 of the Victims and Prisoners Act 2024 establishes a body corporate called the Infected Blood Compensation Authority, "the IBCA".) must first establish that the applicant is no longer registered with an Infected Blood Support Scheme. The applicant's IBSS (Note: Infected Blood Support Schemes (IBSS) replaced the previous ex gratia financial assistance schemes also known as the "Alliance House Organisations". Each administration has their own scheme, EIBSS (England), WIBSS (Wales), SIBSS (Scotland) and IBPS NI (Northern Ireland). Each support scheme also administers the interim compensation payments.) beneficiary status must first be relinquished in order for them to receive their compensation award under this route.

== IBSS route ==
For applicants already registered with an Infected Blood Support Scheme (IBSS), Part 5 of the regulations makes provision for an alternative compensation pathway, the "IBSS route". This allows beneficiaries the option to retain (for their lifetime) any regular support payments which they were receiving under the IBSS entities and from 31 March 2025, these payments will undergo a status change from the historical ex gratia (Note: Historically, the Infected Blood Support Schemes have provided support to people registered with the various schemes on an ex gratia basis.) nature to the support payments being taken into account as compensation payments under the new IBCA scheme. An applicant's future financial loss and future care awards will be combined and assessed to determine the total compensation from these future-calculated components, which together will be used to fund the regular support payments from 1 April 2025.

Under the IBSS route, the IBCA can make the following awards according to Part 5, paragraph 23:

- Injury impact award
- Social impact award
- Autonomy award
- Past financial loss award
- Past care award
- Support scheme top-up award, if required (determined by regulation 27)

As with the core route, the compensation awards under paragraph 5 can be taken as periodic payments spread over prescribed terms of either 5, 10 or 25 years.

== Awards to estates ==
Compensation payments can be claimed by the personal representative of an eligible infected person who is deceased. Under Part 3, section 7 (1), a person is deemed an eligible infected person where paragraph (2), (6), (7) or (8) (of section 7) applies, whether or not that person is deceased.

For the IBCA to process an estate claim, the personal representative must provide documented evidence that under the law amounts to sufficient proof in the form of the following:

- The grant of probate
- Letters of administration for the eligible infected person's estate
- Confirmation of being the eligible infected person's executor

Sadly much of the compensation will be awarded in respect of people who have already died because of their infection. I was told that there has been considerable anxiety about the difficulties arising out of making awards to their estates.

— Sir Robert Francis KC, 16 August 2024

The evidential burden falls on the applicant and the legal standard of proof in relation to any decision under the regulations is the balance of probabilities.

Where an infected person, prior to their death, was a beneficiary of one of the Infected Blood Support Schemes, or one of the Alliance House organisations, their estate will be deemed eligible for compensation through the scheme, but the application may require the provision of further information.

Under the core route, the representative of an estate can claim the following:

- Injury impact award (depending on infection and severity level)
- Social impact award (depending on infection and severity level)
- Autonomy award (depending on infection and severity level)
- Past financial loss award (calculated from date of infection to date of death)
- Basic financial loss award (flat-rate for miscellaneous costs)
- Past care award (at the current commercial rate minus 25%)

Under Part 4, section 8, (4), the overall estate award must be taken as a lump sum since the periodic payment option is only available to living infected applicants.

== Autonomy award ==
The scheme introduces what the Cabinet Office referred to as a novel award. It is intended to afford an element of compensation for the distress suffered as a result of interference with the personal autonomy and private life of the infected.

"It was unethical and wrong that people were not told that they were being tested for HIV or for hepatitis. The failure to tell them was a denial of their personal autonomy."

— The Report, Infected Blood Inquiry, 20 May 2024

The regulations, at 16 (1), cite three specific examples:

1. the loss of marriage or partnership prospects
2. the loss of the opportunity to have children
3. the impact on that person of attacks on that person's home as a consequence of the infection

The background of this category of claim emanates from the Sir Robert Francis KC Recommendations for a Framework which frequently mentions interference in the autonomy of the infected through lack of informed consent or informed choice around the time just prior to infection. It was also borne out of the work of the Infected Blood Inquiry which identified, inter alia, a pattern of a lack of information about the risks of treatment, patients not being provided with sufficient information about their diagnosis, failure by healthcare professionals to be candid with patients and obtain informed consent, and patients having their blood taken or "being tested upon" without them being made aware.

== Reception ==
One campaign group welcomed the regulations as a "massive step forward" with what they felt was a scheme that appeared to be largely "fair overall". The UK Haemophilia Society cautiously welcomed the regulations but expressed concern that the compensation payment levels did not fully reflect the true impact of the financial loss and injury suffered by certain victims. The Hepatitis C Trust welcomed the legislation but admitted to having reservations over the disparities between the infection bandings. Susan Lee, a solicitor for the Trust, said: "We welcome this legislation establishing, at long last, the Infected Blood Compensation Authority ... We are still examining the information released today and awaiting further detail, but remain concerned by the disparities in proposed compensation for people who were given hepatitis C, hepatitis B and HIV."

On 19 March 2025 it was reported in The Independent that a mathematical error in the 2024 regulations had come to light and it meant that the compensation claims already processed by the IBCA were lower in value than they should have been. In a House of Lords debate, Baroness Anderson of Stoke-on-Trent explained that the error was found in the formula used to determine a compensation claimant's financial loss and care award and that the technical mistake had been replaced with a simpler approach in the draft 2025 regulations.

== Legislative scrutiny ==
The regulations and accompanying explanatory memorandum have been criticised by the House of Lords select committee, the Secondary Legislation Scrutiny Committee (SLSC). In their Second Report, published 5 September 2024, they draw instrument 2024/872 to the special attention of the House due to the explanatory memorandum being "of poor quality, using overly technical language and lacking basic information about the policy".

The SLSC focused on five aspects all lacking further detail:

- the application process for the infected including commencement date
- the length of time applications will take to process
- when awards will be paid for claims which have been approved
- how applications will be adjudicated
- further detail on impact, particularly, the budgeted aggregate amount and number of potential applicants

The committee went as far as to express concern over whether the Cabinet Office was "withholding information on the impact and cost of the Regulations".

SI 2024/872 was subject to the made affirmative procedure and requires positive approval of Parliament by 23 October 2024. The government tabled a motion to approve the instrument on 3 September 2024. Following debate in both houses of Parliament, the regulations were approved on 21 October 2024 in the House of Lords and on 23 October 2024 the House of Commons.

=== 2025 Regulations ===
On 12 February 2025, as part of the "second phase" the draft Infected Blood Compensation Scheme Regulations 2025 were laid before both houses. The Secondary Legislation Scrutiny Committee in their 18th Report, published 27 February 2025, referred to the draft 2025 Explanatory Memorandum (EM), specifically they drew attention to the explanation that the 2025 Regulations “restate and expand” the 2024 Regulations. The Committee sought clarification from the Cabinet Office and the reply stated that the 2025 Regulations, in fact, revoke the 2024 Regulations, however, the intention of the wording used in the EM was to show that the policy at the heart of the 2024 Regulations remained unchanged.
