= List of statutory instruments of the United Kingdom, 2024 =

This is a list of statutory instruments made in the United Kingdom in the year 2024.

== 1–100 ==
Number	Title
1 (W. 1)	The A470 Trunk Road (Storey Arms, Powys) (Temporary Part-time 30 mph Speed Limit) Order 2024
2	The Tunbridge Wells (Electoral Changes) Order 2024
3	The Nuneaton & Bedworth (Electoral Changes) Order 2024
4	The Rossendale (Electoral Changes) Order 2024
5 (W. 2)	The A449 & A40 Trunk Roads (Coldra Interchange, Newport to Hardwick Roundabout, Monmouthshire) (Temporary Prohibition of Vehicles, Cyclists and Pedestrians) Order 2024
6 (W. 3)	The M48 Motorway (Junction 23 (Rogiet), Chepstow to (Junction 2 (Newhouse Interchange), Monmouthshire) (Temporary Prohibition of Vehicles and 40 mph Speed limit) Order 2024
7	The Air Navigation (Restriction of Flying) (Leicester) Regulations 2024
8	The Railways and Freight Transport etc. (Revocation) Regulations 2024
9	The Ship’s Report, Importation and Exportation by Sea (Amendment) Regulations 2024
10 (W. 4)	The Agricultural Holdings (Units of Production) (Wales) Order 2024
11	The Rent Officers (Housing Benefit and Universal Credit Functions) (Amendment) Order 2024
12	The Taxation (Cross-border Trade) (Miscellaneous Amendments) Regulations 2024
13 (W. 5)	The Firefighters’ Pension Schemes and Compensation Scheme (Amendment) (Wales) Order 2024
14	The Northampton General Hospital National Health Service Trust (Establishment) (Amendment) Order 2024
15	The National Health Service (Notifiable Reconfigurations and Transitional Provision) Regulations 2024
16	The Local Authority (Public Health, Health and Wellbeing Boards and Health Scrutiny) (Amendment and Saving Provision) Regulations 2024
17 (W. 6)	The Meat Preparations (Amendment and Transitory Modification) (Wales) (Amendment) Regulations 2024
18 (W. 7)	The A48 Trunk Road (Nantycaws to Pensarn, Carmarthenshire) (Temporary Prohibition of Vehicles) Order 2024
19	The Immigration (Age Assessments) Regulations 2024
20	The Official Controls (Extension of Transitional Periods) (Miscellaneous Amendments) Regulations 2024
21	The Air Navigation (Restriction of Flying) (Wimbledon) Regulations 2024
22	The Justification Decision (Scientific Age Imaging) Regulations 2024
23	The Air Navigation (Restriction of Flying) (Old Warden) Regulations 2024
24	The Value Added Tax (Installation of Energy-Saving Materials) Order 2024
25 (W. 8)	The A4042 Trunk Road (Cwmbran Roundabout, Torfaen to Little Mill Junction, Monmouthshire) (Temporary Traffic Prohibitions and Restrictions) Order 2024
26 (W. 9)	The Independent Schools (Provision of Information) (Wales) Regulations 2024
27 (W. 10)	The Independent School Standards (Wales) Regulations 2024
28 (W. 11)	The Independent Schools (Prohibition on Participation in Management) (Wales) Regulations 2024
29	The Council Tax Reduction Schemes (Prescribed Requirements) (England) (Amendment) Regulations 2024
30	The Agricultural Holdings (Units of Production) (England) Order 2024
31 (C. 1)	The Online Safety Act 2023 (Commencement No. 3) Regulations 2024
32	The Energy Act 2023 (Commencement No. 1) Regulations 2024
33	The Dangerous Dogs (Exemption Schemes and Miscellaneous Provisions) (England and Wales) (Amendment) Order 2024
34	The Public Lending Right Scheme 1982 (Commencement of Variation) Order 2024
35 (C. 2)	The Flood and Water Management Act 2010 (Commencement No. 10) Order 2024
36	Not Allocated
37 (W.12)	The Non-Domestic Rating (Miscellaneous and Consequential Amendments to Secondary Legislation) (Wales) Regulations 2024
38 (W. 13)	The Non-Domestic Rating (Heat Networks Relief) (Wales) Regulations 2024
39	The A452 Chester Road and A446 Stonebridge Road (High Speed Two (Phase One)) (Trunking) Order 2024
40 (C. 3)	The Building Safety Act 2022 (Commencement No. 6) Regulations 2024
41	The Higher-Risk Buildings (Keeping and Provision of Information etc.) (England) Regulations 2024
42 (W.14)	The Government of Wales Act 2006 (Budget Motions and Designated Bodies) (Amendment) Order 2024
43	The Representation of the People (Overseas Electors etc.) (Amendment) (Northern Ireland) Regulations 2024
44 (C. 4)	The Environment Act 2021 (Commencement No. 8 and Transitional Provisions) Regulations 2024
45	The Biodiversity Gain Site Register Regulations 2024
46	The Biodiversity Gain Site Register (Financial Penalties and Fees) Regulations 2024
47	The Biodiversity Gain Requirements (Exemptions) Regulations 2024
48	The Biodiversity Gain Requirements (Irreplaceable Habitat) Regulations 2024
49	The Biodiversity Gain (Town and Country Planning) (Consequential Amendments) Regulations 2024
50	The Biodiversity Gain (Town and Country Planning) (Modifications and Amendments) (England) Regulations 2024
51 (W. 15)	The A470 Trunk Road (Brecon Eastern Bypass, Powys) (Temporary Prohibition of Traffic) Order 2024
52	The Sovereign Grant Act 2011 (Change of Percentage) Order 2024
53	The Register of Overseas Entities (Annotation and Removal) Regulations 2024
54	The Registrar (Annotation, Removal and Disclosure Restrictions) Regulations 2024
55	The Immigration (Health Charge) (Amendment) Order 2024
56 (W. 16)	The Council Tax Reduction Schemes (Prescribed Requirements and Default Scheme) (Amendment) (Wales) Regulations 2024
57	Northampton and Lamport Light Railway (Amendment) Order 2024
58	The Criminal Legal Aid (General) (Amendment) Regulations 2024
59	The Police and Firefighters’ Pensions (Remediable Service) (Amendment) Regulations 2024
60	The A12 Chelmsford to A120 Widening Development Consent Order 2024
61 (C. 5)	The Procurement Act 2023 (Commencement No. 1 and Saving Provision) Regulations 2024
62 (L. 1)	The Criminal Procedure (Amendment) Rules 2024
63	The Terrorism Act 2000 (Proscribed Organisations) (Amendment) Order 2024
64	The Digital Government (Disclosure of Information) (Identity Verification Services) Regulations 2024
65	The West Northamptonshire (Electoral Changes) Order 2024
66	The School and Early Years Finance and Childcare (Provision of Information About Young Children) (Amendment) (England) Regulations 2024
67 (W. 17)	The A487 Trunk Road (Dinas Cross, Pembrokeshire) (Temporary Prohibition of Vehicles) Order 2024
68 (W. 18)	The A40/A449 Trunk Roads (West of Glangrwyney, Powys to Raglan, Monmouthshire & Raglan to the Wales/England Border, Monmouthshire) (Temporary Traffic Prohibitions & Restrictions) Order 2024
69	The Money Laundering and Terrorist Financing (High-Risk Countries) (Amendment) Regulations 2024
70	The Drax Power Station Bioenergy with Carbon Capture and Storage Extension Order 2024
71	The Designation of Special Tax Sites (Humber Freeport) Regulations 2024
72 (W. 19)	The A494 Trunk Road (Between Bethel and Glan Yr Afon, Gwynedd) (Temporary Traffic Prohibitions and Restriction) Order 2024
73 (W. 20)	The A40 Trunk Road (Pontargothi, Carmarthenshire) (Temporary Prohibition of Vehicles) Order 2024
74 (W. 21)	The Education Workforce Council (Main Functions) (Wales) (Amendment) Regulations 2024
75	The National Minimum Wage (Amendment) Regulations 2024
76	The Income Tax (Accommodation Allowances of Armed Forces) Regulations 2024
77 (W. 22)	The A4042 Trunk Road (Little Mill, West of Usk to Hardwick Roundabout, Monmouthshire) (Temporary Prohibition of Vehicles) Order 2024
78	The Immigration (Restrictions on Employment and Residential Accommodation) (Codes of Practice) (Amendment) Order 2024
79	The Judicial Pensions (Remediable Service etc.) (Amendment) Regulations 2024
80	The Retained EU Law (Revocation and Reform) Act 2023 (Consequential Provision) Regulations 2024
81	The Immigration Act 2014 (Residential Accommodation) (Maximum Penalty) Order 2024
82	The Immigration (Employment of Adults Subject to Immigration Control) (Maximum Penalty) (Amendment) Order 2024
83 (W. 23)	The Wine (Amendment) (Wales) Regulations 2024
84	The Income Tax (Indexation of Blind Person’s Allowance and Married Couple’s Allowance) Order 2024
85	The Education (Student Fees, Awards and Support) (Amendment) Regulations 2024
86 (W.24)	The Education (Student Finance) (Amounts) (Miscellaneous Amendments) (Wales) Regulations 2024
87	The Child Support (Management of Payments and Arrears and Fees) (Amendment) Regulations 2024
88	The Air Navigation (Restriction of Flying) (Abingdon Air and Country Show) Regulations 2024
89	The Stroud (Electoral Changes) Order 2024
90	The Air Navigation (Restriction of Flying) (Duxford) Regulations 2024
91 (W. 25)	The A470 Trunk Road (South of Upper Boat Junction, Pontypridd, Rhondda Cynon Taf) (Temporary Prohibition of Vehicles) Order 2024
92 (C. 6)	The Levelling-up and Regeneration Act 2023 (Commencement No. 2 and Transitional Provisions) Regulations 2024
93	The Air Navigation (Restriction of Flying) (Plymouth) Regulations 2024
94 (L. 2)	The Employment Tribunals and Employment Appeal Tribunal (Composition of Tribunal) Regulations 2024
95	The Parliamentary Elections and Recall Petition (Welsh Forms) (Amendment) Order 2024
96	The Air Navigation (Restriction of Flying) (Royal Air Force Coningsby) Regulations 2024
97	The Plymouth Hospitals National Health Service Trust (Establishment) (Amendment) Order 2024
98	The Energy Act 2023 (Commencement No. 1) (Amendment) Regulations 2024
99	The Representation of the People (Postal and Proxy Voting etc.) (Amendment) Regulations 2024
100	The Online Safety (List of Overseas Regulators) Regulations 2024

== 101–200 ==
Number	Title
101	The Pension Protection Fund and Occupational Pension Schemes (Levy Ceiling) Order 2024
102	The Securitisation Regulations 2024
103	The Public Interest Merger Reference (Telegraph Media Group Limited) (Pre-emptive Action) Order 2024
104 (C. 7)	The Building Safety Act 2022 (Commencement No. 7 and Transitional Provisions) Regulations 2024
105	The Public Offers and Admissions to Trading Regulations 2024
106 (L. 3)	The Civil Procedure (Amendment) Rules 2024
107	The Data Reporting Services Regulations 2024
108	The Electricity and Gas (Standards of Performance) (Suppliers) (Amendment) Regulations 2024
109	The School Admissions (Admission Arrangements and Co-ordination of Admission Arrangements) (England) (Amendment) Regulations 2024
110	The Building (Registered Building Control Approvers etc.) (England) Regulations 2024
111	The Local Government Finance Act 1988 (Prescription of Non-Domestic Rating Multipliers) (England) Regulations 2024
112 (W. 26)	The Glyn Rhonwy Pumped Storage Generating Station (Amendment) (Wales) Order 2024
113	Not allocated
114	The Financial Services Act 2021 (Overseas Funds Regime and Recognition of Parts of Schemes) (Amendment and Modification) Regulations 2024
115	The Wine (Amendment) (England) Regulations 2024
116	The A57 Link Roads Development Consent (Correction) Order 2024
117	The Hornsea Four Offshore Wind Farm (Correction) Order 2024
118	The Windsor Framework (Democratic Scrutiny) Regulations 2024
119 (W. 27)	The Official Controls (Import of High-Risk Food and Feed of Non-Animal Origin) (Amendment of Commission Implementing Regulation (EU) 2019/1793) (Wales) Regulations 2024
120	The Official Controls (Import of High-Risk Food and Feed of Non-Animal Origin) (Amendment of Commission Implementing Regulation (EU) 2019/1793) (England) Regulations 2024
121	The Statutory Paternity Pay (Amendment) Regulations 2024
122	The Worcester (Electoral Changes) Order 2024
123	The Shropshire (Electoral Changes) Order 2024
124	The Northumberland (Electoral Changes) Order 2024
125	The Independent System Operator and Planner Transfer Scheme Compensation Regulations 2024
126 (W. 28)	The A55 Trunk Road (Junction 34 (Ewloe Interchange) to the Wales/England Border, Flintshire) (Temporary Traffic Prohibitions & Restrictions) Order 2024
127	The Railways (Revocation and Consequential Provision) Regulations 2024
128	The Value Added Tax (Distance Selling) (Amendments) Regulations 2024
129	The M25 Junction 28 Development Consent (Correction) Order 2024
130 (C. 8)	The Finance Act 2021, Section 95 and Schedule 18 (Distance Selling: Northern Ireland) (Appointed Day No. 2) Regulations 2024
131	The Combined Authorities (Mayoral Elections) Order 2017 (Amendment) Regulations 2024
132	The Combined Authorities (Mayors) Filling of Vacancies Order 2017 (Amendment) Regulations 2024
133 (C. 9)	The Finance Act 2009, Sections 101 and 102 (Electronic Sales Suppression) (Appointed Day) Order 2024
134	The Independent System Operator and Planner Transfer Scheme Compensation (Amendment) Regulations 2024
135 (W. 29)	The National Health Service Joint Commissioning Committee (Wales) Regulations 2024
136	The Wireless Telegraphy (Mobile Repeater) (Exemption) (Amendment) Regulations 2024
137	The Sentencing Act 2020 (Amendment of Schedule 21) Regulations 2024
138	The North Tyneside (Electoral Changes) Order 2024
139	The Tandridge (Electoral Changes) Order 2024
140	The Legal Services Act 2007 (Approved Regulator) Order 2024
141	The Town and Country Planning (General Permitted Development) (England) (Amendment) Order 2024
142 (W. 30)	The A465 Trunk Road (Aberdulais Roundabout to Resolven Roundabout, Neath Port Talbot) (Temporary Traffic Prohibitions and Restrictions) Order 2024
143	The Trade Union (Deduction of Union Subscriptions from Wages in the Public Sector) Regulations 2024
144 (W. 31)	The Education (Student Finance) (Fee Limit and Loan Amounts) (Miscellaneous Amendments) (Wales) Regulations 2024
145	The Air Navigation (Restriction of Flying) (Birmingham) Regulations 2024
146	The Road Vehicles (Type-Approval) (Amendment) Regulations 2024
147 (W. 32)	The Port Talbot Harbour (Extension of Limits) Harbour Revision Order 2024
148 (L. 4)	The Supreme Court Fees Order 2024
149	The Social Security (Gibraltar) Order 2024
150	The Communications (Television Licensing) (Amendment) Regulations 2024
151 (W. 33)	The A44 Trunk Road (Llanbadarn Road, Llanbadarn Fawr, Ceredigion) (Temporary Prohibition of Vehicles) Order 2024
152	The Air Navigation (Restriction of Flying) (Download Festival, Leicestershire) Regulations 2024
153	The Registrar of Companies (Fees) (Register of Overseas Entities) Regulations 2024
154	The Air Navigation (Restriction of Flying) (Leicester) (No. 2) Regulations 2024
155	The Registrar of Companies (Fees) (Amendment) Regulations 2024
156	The Dudley (Electoral Changes) Order 2024
157	The North Northamptonshire (Electoral Changes) Order 2024
158	The Air Navigation (Restriction of Flying) (Murrayfield Stadium) Regulations 2024
159	The Universal Credit (Work-Related Requirements) In Work Pilot Scheme (Extension) Order 2024
160	The Air Navigation (Restriction of Flying) (Brighton) Regulations 2024
161 (W. 34)	The M4 Motorway (Junction 44 (Lon Las) to Junction 45 (Ynysforgan), Swansea) (Temporary Prohibition of Vehicles) Order 2024
162	The Offshore Installations (Safety Zones) Order 2024
163	The Windsor Framework (UK Internal Market and Unfettered Access) Regulations 2024
164	The Windsor Framework (Constitutional Status of Northern Ireland) Regulations 2024
165	The Nutrition and Health Claims (England) (Amendment) Regulations 2024
166	The Customs (Preferential Trade Arrangements: Error in Evidence of Origin) Regulations 2024
167	The Income Tax (Digital Requirements) (Amendment) Regulations 2024
168	The Electricity (Criteria for Relevant Electricity Projects) (Transmission) Regulations 2024
169	The Financial Services and Markets Act 2000 (Regulated Activities) (Amendment) Order 2024
170	The Firefighters’ Pension Scheme (England) (Amendment) Regulations 2024
171	The Air Navigation (Restriction of Flying) (Aylestone, Leicestershire) (Emergency) Regulations 2024
172 (S. 1)	The Extradition Appeals (Scotland) Order 2024
173 (W. 35)	The A458 Trunk Road (East of Buttington Cross, Buttington, Powys) (Temporary Traffic Prohibitions) Order 2024
174	The Net Zero Teesside Order 2024
175	The Crime and Courts Act 2013 (Application and Modification of the Extradition Act 2003) (England and Wales) Order 2024
176	The Tax Credits (Miscellaneous Amendments) Regulations 2024
177	The Air Navigation (Restriction of Flying) (Sherburn-in-Elmet Air Race) Regulations 2024
178	The Haiti (Sanctions) (Amendment) Regulations 2024
179	The Air Navigation (Restriction of Flying) (Ascot) Regulations 2024
180 (W. 36)	The Non-Domestic Rating (Multiplier) (Wales) Regulations 2024
181	The Police and Crime Commissioner Elections (Returning Officers’ Accounts) Regulations 2024
182	The Post Office Compensation Schemes and Victims of Overseas Terrorism Compensation Scheme (Tax Exemptions and Relief) Regulations 2024
183	The Non-Domestic Rating (Designated Areas) Regulations 2024
184	The Non-Domestic Rating (Rates Retention and Renewable Energy Projects) (Amendment) Regulations 2024
185 (W. 37)	The Official Statistics (Wales) (Amendment) Order 2024
186	The Police and Crime Commissioner Elections (Designation of Local Authorities and Police Area Returning Officers) Order 2024
187	The Social Security (Contributions) (Amendment) Regulations 2024
188	The Visiting Forces (Designation) Order 2024
189	The Inspectors of Education, Children’s Services and Skills Order 2024
190	The Misuse of Drugs Act 1971 (Amendment) Order 2024
191	The Naval, Military and Air Forces Etc. (Disablement and Death) Service Pensions (Amendment) Order 2024
192	The Greenhouse Gas Emissions Trading Scheme (Amendment) Order 2024
193	The Copyright and Performances (Application to Other Countries) (Amendment) Order 2024
194	The Customs (Miscellaneous Amendments) Regulations 2024
195	The Electricity (Individual Exemption from the Requirement for a Generation Licence) (Slough Multifuel) (England) Order 2024
196	The Air Navigation (Restriction of Flying) (Torbay) Regulations 2024
197	The Air Navigation (Restriction of Flying) (Sywell) Regulations 2024
198	The Air Navigation (Restriction of Flying) (Swansea) Regulations 2024
199	The Pneumoconiosis etc. (Workers' Compensation) (Specified Diseases and Prescribed Occupations) (Amendment) Regulations 2024
200	The Diocese of Derby (Educational Endowments) (Starkholmes Church of England School) Order 2024

== 201–537 ==
Number	Title
201	The Diocese of Salisbury (Educational Endowments) (the former Worton and Marston Church of England Primary School) Order 2024
202	The Diocese of Salisbury (Educational Endowments) (Winterbourne Earls Church of England Primary School) Order 2024
203 (W. 38)	The A40 Trunk Road (Raglan Interchange to the Wales/England Border, Monmouthshire) (Temporary Traffic Prohibitions & Restrictions) Order 2024
204	The Water Industry Act 1991 (Amendment) Order 2024
205	The Water Industry (Special Administration) Regulations 2024
206	The Air Navigation (Restriction of Flying) (Aylestone, Leicestershire) (Emergency) (Amendment) Regulations 2024
207 (W. 39) (C. 10)	The Building Safety Act 2022 (Commencement No. 4, Transitional and Saving Provisions) (Wales) Regulations 2024
208	The School Attendance (Pupil Registration) (England) Regulations 2024
209	The Education (Information About Individual Pupils) (England) (Amendment) Regulations 2024
210	The Education (Penalty Notices) (England) (Amendment) Regulations 2024
211 (W. 40)	The A487 Trunk Road (Trefechan, Aberystwyth, Ceredigion) (Temporary Prohibition of Vehicles) Order 2024
212	The Prison and Young Offender Institution (Adjudication) (Amendment) Rules 2024
213	The Employment Rights (Increase of Limits) Order 2024
214 (W. 41)	The A487 Trunk Road (Great Darkgate Street and Owain Glyndwr Square, Aberystwyth, Ceredigion) (Temporary Traffic Prohibitions) Order 2024
215 (W. 42)	The A48 Trunk Road (East of Nantycaws, Carmarthenshire) (Temporary Prohibition of Right-hand Turn) Order 2024
216 (W. 43)	The A5 Trunk Road (Holyhead Road Roundabout, Bangor, Gwynedd to Mona Road Roundabout, Menai Bridge, Anglesey) (Temporary Prohibition of Vehicles, Cyclists & Pedestrians) Order 2024
217 (W. 44)	The Tertiary Education and Research (Wales) Act 2022 (Commencement No. 2 and Transitory Provision) (Amendment) Order 2024
218	The Russia (Sanctions) (EU Exit) (Amendment) Regulations 2024
219	The Nuclear Decommissioning Authority (Pension Scheme Amendment) Regulations 2024
220	The Personal Injuries (NHS Charges) (Amounts) (Amendment) Regulations 2024
221	The Medical Devices (In Vitro Diagnostic Devices etc.) (Amendment) Regulations 2024
222	The Air Navigation (Restriction of Flying) (Southport) Regulations 2024
223	The Air Navigation (Restriction of Flying) (Royal Air Force Cosford) Regulations 2024
224 (W. 45)	The A483 Trunk Road (West of Cilmery, Powys) (Temporary Prohibition of Traffic) Order 2024
225	The Access to the Countryside (Coastal Margin) (Shotley Gate to Felixstowe Ferry) (No.1) Order 2024
226 (W. 46)	The A477 Trunk Road (St Clears, Carmarthenshire to Pembroke Dock, Pembrokeshire) (Temporary Speed Restrictions & No Overtaking) Order 2024
227 (W. 47)	The A477 Trunk Road (Nash Fingerpost Junction, Pembrokeshire) (Temporary Traffic Restriction & Prohibition) Order 2024
228	The Aviation Security (Air Cargo Agents) Regulations 2024
229	The Water Industry (Special Administration) (England and Wales) Rules 2024
230	The Medworth Energy from Waste Combined Heat and Power Facility Order 2024
231	The Sea Fisheries (Amendment) Regulations 2024
232	The East Midlands Combined County Authority Regulations 2024
233	The Registered Office Address (Rectification of Register) Regulations 2024
234	The Limited Liability Partnerships (Application of Company Law) Regulations 2024
235	The Service Address (Rectification of Register) Regulations 2024
236	The Principal Office Address (Rectification of Register) Regulations 2024
237	The Mesothelioma Lump Sum Payments (Conditions and Amounts) (Amendment) Regulations 2024
238 (W. 48)	The Building (Restricted Activities and Functions) (Wales) Regulations 2024
239	The Misuse of Drugs and Misuse of Drugs (Designation) (England and Wales and Scotland) (Amendment) Regulations 2024 (revoked)
240	The Pneumoconiosis etc. (Workers’ Compensation) (Payment of Claims) (Amendment) Regulations 2024
241	The Oil and Gas Authority (Levy and Fees) Regulations 2024
242	The Social Security Benefits Up-rating Order 2024
243	The Guaranteed Minimum Pensions Increase Order 2024
244 (W. 49)	The Building (Approved Inspectors etc.) (Amendment) (Wales) Regulations 2024
245	The Code of Practice (Picketing) Order 2024
246	The Non-Domestic Rating (Consequential and Other Amendments) (England) Regulations 2024
247	The Tax Credits, Child Benefit and Guardian’s Allowance Up-rating Regulations 2024
248	The Misuse of Drugs and Misuse of Drugs (Designation) (England and Wales and Scotland) (Amendment and Revocation) Regulations 2024
249	The Social Security (Contributions) (Limits and Thresholds, National Insurance Funds Payments and Extension of Veterans Relief) Regulations 2024
250 (C. 11)	The Financial Services and Markets Act 2023 (Commencement No. 5) Regulations 2024
251	The Carer’s Leave Regulations 2024
252	The Bank of England Levy (Amount of Levy Payable) Regulations 2024
253	The Domestic Abuse Protection Orders (County Court: Relevant Proceedings) Regulations 2024
254 (L. 5)	The Magistrates’ Courts (Amendment) Rules 2024
255	The Air Navigation (Restriction of Flying) (Wembley) Regulations 2024
256	The Air Navigation (Restriction of Flying) (Old Buckenham) Regulations 2024
257	The Air Navigation (Restriction of Flying) (Bournemouth) Regulations 2024
258 (L. 6)	The Family Court (Composition and Distribution of Business) (Amendment) Rules 2024
259 (L. 7)	The Crown Court (Amendment) Rules 2024
260	The Designation of Schools Having a Religious Character (England) Order 2024
261	The Air Navigation (Restriction of Flying) (Clacton-on-Sea) Regulations 2024
262	The Human Tissue Act 2004 (Supply of Information about Transplants) Regulations 2024
263	Not Allocated
264	The Maternity Leave, Adoption Leave and Shared Parental Leave (Amendment) Regulations 2024
265 (C. 12)	The Charities Act 2022 (Commencement No. 3, Consequential, Saving and Transitional Provisions) Regulations 2024
266	The Carer's Leave (Consequential Amendments to Subordinate Legislation) Regulations 2024
267 (W. 50)	The A44 Trunk Road (Llanbadarn Fawr, Ceredigion) (Temporary Prohibition of Vehicles) Order 2024
268 (W. 51)	The A4042 Trunk Road (Caerleon Roundabout, Newport to Cwmbran Roundabout, Torfaen) (Temporary Prohibition of Vehicles) Order 2024
269 (C. 13)	The Economic Crime and Corporate Transparency Act 2023 (Commencement No. 2 and Transitional Provision) Regulations 2024
270 (C. 14)	The Small Business, Enterprise and Employment Act 2015 (Commencement No. 8) Regulations 2024
271	The National Health Service (Primary Dental Services and Dental Charges) (Amendment) Regulations 2024
272	The Football Spectators (2024 UEFA European Championship Control Period) Order 2024
273	The Pensions Act 2004 (Codes of Practice) (Revocation) Order 2024
274	The Occupational and Personal Pension Schemes (General Levy) (Amendment) Regulations 2024
275	The Air Navigation (Restriction of Flying) (Aylestone, Leicestershire) (Emergency) (Revocation) Regulations 2024
276	The Air Navigation (Restriction of Flying) (Stonehenge) Regulations 2024
277	The Air Navigation (Restriction of Flying) (Finsbury Park) Regulations 2024
278	Not Allocated
279	The County Durham (Electoral Changes) Order 2024
280	The Merchant Shipping (Special Measures to Enhance Maritime Safety) Regulations 2024
281	The National Health Service Pension Schemes (Amendment) Regulations 2024
282	The Carer’s Assistance (Carer Support Payment) (Scotland) Regulations 2023 (Consequential Amendments) Order 2024
283 (W. 52)	The A40 Trunk Road (Glangrwyney, Powys) (Temporary Prohibition of Traffic) Order 2024
284	The Social Security Revaluation of Earnings Factors Order 2024
285	The Single Trade Window (Establishment, Operation and Information) Regulations 2024
286 (C. 15)	The Finance Act 2024, Schedule 1 (Research and Development) (Appointed Day) Regulations 2024
287	The Income Tax (Exemption of Social Security Benefits) Regulations 2024
288	The Access to the Countryside (Coastal Margin) (Hunstanton to Sutton Bridge) Order 2024
289	The Social Security (Contributions) (Amendment No. 2) Regulations 2024
290	The Public Service Pensions Revaluation Order 2024
291 (W. 53)	The A487 Trunk Road (The New Dyfi Bridge, Machynlleth, Powys / Gwynedd) (30 mph & 50 mph Speed Limit) Order 2024
292 (W. 54)	The A55 Trunk Road (Junction 11 (Llys y Gwynt) to Junction 12 (Tal-y-bont), Gwynedd) (Temporary Prohibition of Vehicles, Cyclists & Pedestrians) Order 2024
293 (W. 55)	The A487 Trunk Road (The Old Dyfi Bridge, Machynlleth, Powys / Gwynedd) (Prohibitions & Waiting Restrictions) Order 2024
294	The National Health Service (Optical Charges and Payments) (Amendment) Regulations 2024
295	The Government Resources and Accounts Act 2000 (Estimates and Accounts) Order 2024
296	The Animal Welfare (Primate Licences) (England) Regulations 2024
297	The Police and Crime Commissioner Elections (Local Returning Officers’ and Police Area Returning Officers’ Charges) Order 2024
298	The Recall Petition (Petition Officers’ Charges) Regulations 2024
299	The Air Navigation (Restriction of Flying) (Finsbury Park) (No. 2) Regulations 2024
300	The Excise Duties (Surcharges or Rebates) (Hydrocarbon Oils etc.) Order 2022 (Continuation) Order 2024
537	The Fair Dealing Obligations (Milk) Regulations 2024

- Rixton and Warburton Bridge Order 2024 (SI 2024/630)

== See also ==
- Infected Blood Compensation Scheme Regulations 2024 – Regulations to establish a compensation payment scheme
