= Victims and Prisoners Act 2024 =

Act of the Parliament of the United Kingdom

Victims and Prisoners Act 2024 (Note: Section 82.)
- Act of Parliament
- Parliament of the United Kingdom
- Long title: An Act to make provision about victims of criminal conduct and others affected by criminal conduct; about the appointment and functions of advocates for victims of major incidents; for an infected blood compensation scheme; about the release of prisoners; about the membership and functions of the Parole Board; to prohibit certain prisoners from forming a marriage or civil partnership; and for connected purposes.
- Citation: 2024 c. 21
- Introduced by: Dominic Raab, Secretary of State for Justice; (Commons); Lord Bellamy, Parliamentary Under-Secretary of State, Ministry of Justice (Lords)
- Territorial extent: England and Wales; Scotland (in part); Northern Ireland (in part); (Note: Section 80.)

Dates
- Royal assent: 24 May 2024
- Commencement: Various (Note: Section 81.)
Other legislation
Amends	House of Commons Disqualification Act 1975; Police Act 1996; Domestic Violence, Crime and Victims Act 2004; Legal Aid, Sentencing and Punishment of Offenders Act 2012; Data Protection Act 2018; Domestic Abuse Act 2021; Police, Crime, Sentencing and Courts Act 2022
Amended by	Victims and Prisoners Act 2024 (Permitted Disclosures) Regulations 2025; Sentencing Act 2026; Victims and Courts Act 2026
Relates to	Infected Blood Compensation Scheme Regulations 2024

Status: Amended

History of passage through Parliament

Text of statute as originally enacted

Revised text of statute as amended

The Victims and Prisoners Act 2024 (c. 21) is an act of the Parliament of the United Kingdom, introduced by the Secretary of State for Justice, Dominic Raab, in March 2023.

The act makes provision for the establishment of an Independent Advocate to support victims of major incidents, and makes changes to the parole system of England and Wales, allowing government ministers to veto the release of some prisoners. Ministers will also have the power to restrict marriage in prisons in England and Wales for those serving whole life orders. The bill was introduced into Parliament on 29 March 2023. It was one of the last pieces of legislation passed into law by the parliament elected in 2019 before it was dissolved prior to the 2024 general election.

In December 2023, an amendment was added to the legislation to establish a compensation scheme for victims of the contaminated haemophilia blood products scandal. The government failed to prevent the amendment in a vote in the House of Commons, despite a three-line whip, in what was seen as a significant blow to the Sunak administration's authority. Provision relating to inflected blood compensation is set out in Part 3 of the act.

A further (but unsuccessful) amendment, put forward with the support of the Catholic Church and the Church of England, would have made provision for a central collection of data covering "the number of primary carers in prison and the number and age of their children".

Section 34(2) provides for significant incidents to be declared as "major incidents" and for the Independent Public Advocate (IPA) to be called upon to support victims of the incident in partnership with relevant authorities.

One of its first times the provision of the act were used was in August 2024, in order to prevent the serial killer Levi Bellfield from entering into a civil partnership with his girlfriend.
