= Civil Justice Council =

UK non-departmental public body

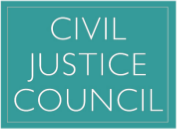

The Civil Justice Council is a UK non-departmental public body that advises the Lord Chancellor on civil justice and civil procedure in England and Wales. It was established in 1998 under section 6 of the Civil Procedure Act 1997 and is sponsored by the Ministry of Justice. It is chaired by the Master of the Rolls.

== Composition ==
The Council must include:

- Members of the judiciary;
- Members of the legal professions;
- Civil servants concerned with the administration of the courts;
- Persons experienced in consumer affairs;
- Persons experienced in lay advice; and
- Representatives of particular kinds of litigants, for example, businesses or employees.
- Chair: Master of the Rolls and Head of Civil Justice, Sir Geoffrey Vos;
- 24 members;
- Ex officio members:
  - Deputy Head of Civil Justice;

== Functions ==
The Council's functions are to:

- Keep the civil justice system under review;
- Consider how to make the civil justice system more accessible, fair and efficient;
- Advise the Lord Chancellor and the judiciary on the development of the civil justice system;
- Refer proposals for changes in the civil justice system to the Lord Chancellor and the Civil Procedure Rules Committee; and
- Make proposals for research.

Subcommittees include:

- Access to justice committee;
- Costs committee; (whose Chair is Mr Justice Foskett QC and members include Senior Costs Judge Peter Hurst, Simon Brown QC, John Windsor (Marks and Spencer) Chris Warner (Which?) Murray Heining, Helen Buczynksky (Unison) HHJ Hodge QC, District Judge Marshall Philips, Peter Causton (solicitor representing defendant solicitors), David Marshall (solicitor representing claimant solicitors) David Greene (solicitor representing commercial litigation solicitors) Robert Wright and Adrian Jaggard). The purpose of the costs committee is to advise the Master of The Rolls as to Guideline Hourly rates to be referred to in summary assessment of costs, based upon evidence.
- Alternative Dispute Resolution committee;
- Experts committee.

In February 2008, the Ministry of Justice announced a study of the work of the Council to:

- Review the role and performance of the Civil Justice Council and make recommendations;
- Evaluate the continuing need for body to perform the role and functions of the Council 1997 Act;
- Review whether a non-departmental body remains the most appropriate institution;
- Assess the past effectiveness of the Council; and
- Consider ways in which the Council could be made more effective.
