= A and Others v National Blood Authority and Another =

Consumer law case involving claimants infected with hepatitis C

A & Ors v National Blood Authority & Ors
- Court: High Court of Justice
- Full case name: A and Others v National Blood Authority and Another
- Decided: 26 March 2001
- Citation: [2001] EWHC QB 446

Court membership
- Judge sitting: Mr Justice Burton

Keywords
- Safety level; Blood as a defective product; Screening for HCV; Surrogate testing; Product liability; Non-standard product; Legitimate expectation; Comparative law

A and Others v National Blood Authority and Another, also known as the Hepatitis C Litigation, was a landmark product liability case of 2001 primarily concerning blood transfusions but also blood products or transplanted organs, all of which were infected with hepatitis C, where liability was established under the Consumer Protection Act 1987 and the Product Liability Directive (85/374/EEC) even in the absence of the ability to test to ascertain which blood transfusions were defective. The claimants were 114 individuals, six of whom were considered lead plaintiffs and given close consideration by the judge, Mr Justice Burton. Several of the claimants were minors who had become infected with Hepatitis C in the course of their treatment for leukaemia. The defendants were the National Blood Authority (NBA) and in respect of Wales, the Velindre NHS Trust, Cardiff. The court found that the UK government should have implemented measures to screen donated blood for HCV by March 1990, rather than September 1991, and that surrogate testing should have been introduced within the United Kingdom no later than 1 March 1988.

== Blood as a product ==
This case demonstrated that blood for transfusion and organs for transplantation could be considered natural substances under Section 45 (1) of the Consumer Protection Act 1987, and as such, blood infected with hepatitis C would count as a defective product. Burton J accepted that the hepatitis C–infected blood bags were non–standard products that would be at variance with the producer's intended use. It was not accepted, however, that all blood products were likely to be considered similarly defective. The Defendants did not agree that blood was a non–standard product and claimed that all blood, even though it was processed to a certain degree, carried an inherent risk—by virtue of being derived from a ″natural raw material″.

Burton J was satisfied that the problem of infected blood was not known to the consumer, nor did the consumer expect the bag of blood they were being given to be defective. After taking into account all circumstances as per the Product Liability Directive 85/374/EEC, the blood which had been infected with hepatitis C on and after 1 March 1988 failed to provide the expected level of safety and as such, was deemed to be a defective product within the meaning of Article 6.

== Circumstances under Article 6 ==
The court looked to the EU Product Liability Directive rather than the Consumer Protection Act 1987. The wording of Article 6 of the Directive states that when all circumstances are taken into account, and the product does not provide the safety that someone is entitled to expect, that product is rendered defective.

Conclusions on Article 6

I do not consider it to be arguable that the consumer had an actual expectation that blood being supplied to him was not 100% clean, nor do I conclude that he had knowledge that it was, or was likely to be, infected with Hepatitis C.

— Mr Justice Burton

The Defendant's argued that the wording under Article 6 as to how ″all circumstances″ should be taken into account in establishing the level of safety, meant that the court had to consider what steps could reasonably have been expected of the producer, the National Blood Authority, in trying to avoid viral transmission. However, Burton J held that avoidability was not one of the circumstances that needed to be taken into account under Article 6.

The circumstances under Article 6 which should be taken into account include:

1. the way the product is presented, for example, the price or any warnings displayed;
2. the reasonable expected or foreseeable use of the product; (Note: An unexpected use of a non–dangerous product would not necessarily render the product defective. For products where the expected use is considered dangerous, a different 'dangerousness' can still be claimed.)
3. the time when the product was put into circulation, for example, whether the product was stale or out of date.

Under Article 6(2), if a newer version of a product was to come into circulation, it would not render the older version defective simply because there was a better version available.

== NANBH and precautions ==
In the HIV Haemophilia Litigation, one of two legal issues cited in paragraph 20 of the Advice on Settlement document posed the question as to whether the defendants were negligent in exposing the plaintiffs to the risk of infection historically from hepatitis and whether this would extend to the Department of Health being held liable should the plaintiffs be found to be infected with an unforeseen virus, which in this case, was HIV.

The question came about from material which had been produced by the plaintiff's legal advisors during the proceedings and more specifically from the defendant's discovery which Mr Justice Ognall had permitted the use of in the pending Hepatitis Litigation (A and Others v National Blood Authority and Another), where non-A non-B hepatitis (NANBH) was to become the focus over which precautions should have been taken historically, rather than the "proxy" as it had been in the HIV Haemophilia Litigation.

== Significance ==
The late Lord Morris of Manchester, then president of the UK Haemophilia Society, said that the case represented a ″landmark judgement″ that would be of considerable interest to several thousand others who had been infected with hepatitis C as a result of NHS–supplied blood products. The ruling, which found in favour of the claimants, was significant in that it was the first of its kind where there was a finding of liability in medical circumstances under consumer law, without the need for a finding of fault, in particular, without needing to prove fault on the part of the National Blood Authority who had supplied the defective product. It was also the first group action under the Consumer Protection Act 1987. The case was able to proceed by drawing legal comparisons between differing legal systems, particularly involving European law.

== Government response ==
In a House of Lords debate on 23 March 2001, Lord Hunt of Kings Heath, in his role as Parliamentary Under-Secretary of State for Health at the Department of Health, said that careful consideration would have to be given to the implications of the judgment which he described as the first of its kind in relation to the NHS under the Consumer Protection Act. In the same debate, Lord Clement-Jones made the claim that officials of the Parliamentary Under–Secretary of State at the Department of Health had been discretely warning journalists as to the possible implications of the judgment and that it had been reported in The Independent that the NHS could see claims in the region of hundreds of millions if similarly injured consumers were to follow the precedent of this case.

== See also ==
- Advisory Committee on the Virological Safety of Blood (ACVSB)
- HIV Haemophilia Litigation
- M.C. and Others v Italy (Right to property case involving bad blood victims)
- R (March) v Secretary of State for Health (2010 judicial review by a claimant treated with contaminated blood products)
