= George William Penrose, Lord Penrose =

Scottish judge (1938–2025)

The Right Honourable Lord Penrose PC

Personal details
- Born: George William Penrose; 2 June 1938 Port Glasgow, Scotland
- Died: 1 May 2025 (aged 86) Edinburgh, Scotland
- Occupation: Judge
- Profession: Advocate

George William Penrose, Lord Penrose, PC (2 June 1938 – 1 May 2025) was a Scottish judge and member of the Privy Council who sat in the Court of Session, the supreme civil court.

Penrose qualified as a chartered accountant, was admitted to the bar as an advocate and was made Senior Counsel in 1978. Between 1988 and 1990, he worked in Crown Office, the prosecution service for Scotland. He was made Scotland's first commercial judge in 1994 and was acknowledged as an expert in commercial law. He chaired two major independent inquiries, establishing in each case complex authoritative narratives of events.

== Background ==
Penrose was born on 2 June 1938. He had a son and two daughters. Penrose died on 1 May 2025, at the age of 86.

== 2004 Equitable Life inquiry ==
Lord Penrose chaired the public inquiry that produced The Penrose Report into the near-collapse of the mutual life assurance company Equitable Life. In 2001, Lord Penrose was asked by the Treasury to investigate the history of the company. His 818-page report was published on 8 March 2004. The Report cost £2.5 million and was non-statutory, meaning in particular that it did not have powers to compel attendance. His conclusions (Chapter 19) drew attention, amongst other things, to the inadequately skilled membership of the Board and to the problem that regulatory focus on solvency did not appropriately focus on PRE (policyholders' reasonable expectations) as to final bonus. The Report detailed the history of the fund. It highlighted the long-term underlying weakness of a fund where the capital assets were unfairly held so as to benefit crystallised maturities disproportionately (Chapter 20). This inclusion of PRE as an operative part of the business that required to be supervised formed thereafter a baseline for a European Parliament report published in 2007 into lessons to be learned at the wider European level. In consequence, the 2007 Report demanded that terminal payments and liabilities across the entire European Union must be the subject of regulatory supervision and anticipatory provision. This proved to be the wider legacy of the Penrose Report.

== 2015 contaminated blood inquiry (Scotland) ==
Lord Penrose also headed the Penrose Inquiry into Hepatitis C and HIV infections acquired from NHS Scotland treatment with blood and blood products such as Factor VIII. The Report was described to the House of Commons in Westminster as providing "the first authoritative narrative" of the events in question. The House was also informed that Lord Penrose had taken 150 statements from witnesses and relatives and had considered over 118,000 documents.
