= Bio Products Laboratory =

Blood plasma product manufacturing laboratory

Bio Products Laboratory Limited
- Company type: Subsidiary
- Industry: Health care
- Founded: 1954; 72 years ago
- Headquarters: Elstree, Hertfordshire, England, UK
- Products: Blood plasma
- Owner: PRUK (2010–13); BPL Holdings (2013–16)
- Parent: UK Government (1954–2016); Bain Capital (2013–16); Creat Group (2016–22); Permira (2022–present); Marcucci family (2022–present)
- Subsidiaries: BPL Therapeutics; BPL Plasma
- Website: bplgroup.com

Bio Products Laboratory Limited (BPL) is a company involved in the manufacture of human blood plasma products, located in Elstree, Hertfordshire, England. It is run as a commercial business and supplies plasma derived products to the National Health Service in the UK as well as to markets in over 45 countries.

BPL was a state owned organization and it was part of the U.K. National Health Service for most of its existence. On 1 September 2022, Permira and the Marcucci family acquired BPL and announced that their operations will be merged with another company acquired by the duo, Kedrion.

== History ==
The Blood Products Laboratory was established in 1954 as part of the Lister Institute of Preventive Medicine and initially run by the Medical Research Council until its transfer to the National Health Service (NHS) in 1978. BPL's predecessor organisation was established in 1943. Lister purchased the Elstree site in 1902 and operated on the site until 1978.

During this time, Professor R. A.Kekwick, working at the Lister Institute undertook experimental and production work with A.S. McFarlane. The two scientists devised a process to clarify outdated blood plasma to render it suitable for transfusion. Laboratory testing was undertaken in the historic Queensbury Lodge, the site of Joseph Lister's laboratory.

In 1943, Kekwick was appointed Head of the Lister's Biophysics Division, Kekiwick established the Blood Filtration Unit and he and his team worked on methods of freeze-drying plasma and then of separating out proteins in blood plasma. These early products were used to meet the needs of the Armed Services and civilian establishments. In 1948 the Blood Filtration Unit came under the joint management of the Medical Research Council (MRC) and the Lister Institute, and the name was changed to the Blood Products Research Unit and it occupied the newly built laboratories (or 'Building 25'). The aim of the Unit was directed towards the preparation of plasma fractions for clinical use

During the 1940s, Brinkhous and McFarlane discovered that transfusions using whole blood or plasma provided a means of FVIII replacement. Applications using this early discover were limited due to naturally low concentrations of this anti-haemophilic factor in blood and plasma and volume constraints in the circulatory system.

In 1954, the Government wished to establish a site for increased production of blood products. This followed on from the importance of blood in therapeutic medicine, the need for blood products during the Second World War (particularly the use of albumin) and the formation on 26 September 1946 of the National Blood Transfusion Service. It had also been discovered that a second form of haemophilia (Haemophilia B) existed, which was treatable with blood protein called Factor IX. An agreement was reached between the Government, MRC and the Lister Institute and the Blood Products Laboratory was established with funding from the Ministry of Health. Enlarged facilities for plasma fractionation and freeze-drying were established.

During the 1970s and early 1980s it became apparent that Factor VIII products produced at the BPL site (and other products from other companies) may have infected haemophiliacs with life-threatening viruses. Bigger risks to the patient population arose from U.S.imported products, a practice required since the UK was not self-sufficient in plasma products.

In 1991 it was renamed the Bio Products Laboratory to reflect the internal market in the National Health Service and in 1993 it became part of the National Blood Authority. BPL began cross-charging NHS hospitals for its products and limited competition in the international blood plasma market was permitted.

In 1998 the BPL began sourcing its plasma from the United States due to concerns over vCJD in the UK. In 2002 the Department of Health (DoH) formed DCI Biologicals Inc to purchase US company Life Resources Inc to supply all of the BPL's plasma.

BPL became an operating division within new special health authority, NHS Blood and Transplant, in 2005. This placed BPL alongside the National Blood Service and the organ transplant division, a strategic partnership to safeguard blood, tissues and blood products.

On 31 December 2010 the BPL was vested into a limited company, Bio Products Laboratory Ltd, and ownership transferred to the DoH, with BPL Ltd and DCI Biologicals Inc brought under the same DoH holding company, Plasma Resources UK Ltd.

On 18 July 2013 it was announced by Business Secretary Vince Cable that Bain Capital had bought 80% of Plasma Resources UK (PRUK) from the DoH for £230m, which included both BPL and DCI Biologicals.

The company was subsequently renamed BPL Holdings, with the original BPL site now called BPL Therapeutics and DCI named BPL Plasma. In 2018, when it was the sole owner, the Chinese group Creat had announced that it planned to integrate BPL's operations with German plasma product manufacturer Biotest. In 2022, Creat was required to dispose of its U.S. plasma centers which necessitated a sale of BPL as a whole. The sale was made to Kedrion BioPharma and BPL became a subsidiary of the Kedrion Group.

== Ownership ==
In 2013, Bain Capital acquired an 80% controlling interest in BPL, previously wholly owned by the UK Government. Three years later, the shareholders decided to sell BPL Holdings to Creat, an investment company based in Beijing that owns part of a plasma fractionator in China.

In 2022, Permira and Marcucci entered into an agreement to acquire and merge BPL and Kedrion operations into one venture. As a result, the new company would inherit the shareholders of the companies involved, requiring the support of its co-investors.

In this case, FSI, CDP Equity and the other Kedrion shareholders had their shares transferred to the new company. In turn, to complete the agreement, the family group received the support of its co-investors, Ampersand Capital Partners and a wholly owned subsidiary of Abu Dhabi Investment Authority (ADIA).

In 2023, the BPL site became known as Kedrion Elstree although its product portfolio continued to be marketed as 'BPL'.

== See also ==
- National Blood Service
- NHS Blood and Transplant
