= Penrose Inquiry =

2008–15 Scottish inquiry into tainted blood

The Penrose Inquiry was the public inquiry into hepatitis C and HIV infections from NHS Scotland treatment with blood and blood products such as factor VIII, often used by people with haemophilia. The event is often called the "tainted blood scandal" or "contaminated blood scandal".

It was not in the terms of reference of the inquiry to examine events in England, and a statutory public inquiry has never been held in England. The Penrose Inquiry was set up by Scottish Government under the Inquiries Act 2005 and cost £12,123,754. It was announced by Nicola Sturgeon on 23 April 2008. George William Penrose, Lord Penrose was the chairman of the inquiry. Andrea Summers was the solicitor for the inquiry and following this inquiry was appointed to the Scottish Child Abuse Inquiry.

The inquiry took six years and the victims branded it a "total whitewash".

== Publication ==
Lord Penrose did not attend the launch of the final report which was held on 25 March 2015 in Edinburgh. He was reported to have been too ill to attend.

== Criticism ==
The final report of the Penrose Inquiry was widely branded a whitewash after it made only one recommendation, that steps should be taken to offer blood tests to anyone in Scotland who had a blood transfusion before 1991 and who has not already been tested for hepatitis C. The inquiry did not apportion blame. Andrea Summers, solicitor to the inquiry, attended a press conference to deliver the report and members of audience shouted 'whitewash' and 'cover up' as the audience walked out.

Professor John Cash who was a former director of the Scottish National Blood Transfusion Service said the executives responsible were able to avoid giving evidence. "Did Lord Penrose get to speak to the people with the real answers? No, he didn't. –– He tried but through no fault of his own he couldn't get to the truth. He ran into serious problems because the Inquiries Act meant there was a whole area he could not address".

Five deaths were examined as outlined in the inquiry's terms of reference; these were David Black, Eileen O'Hara, Alexander Black Laing, Neil Mullen and Victor Tamburrini. Out of these 5 cases, only 1 of the victims was a haemophiliac. The 1 haemophilia case was a hepatitis C infection that occurred in the 1960s, before factor concentrates were in use, meaning that the case did not relate to the relevant period which is regarded at the mid-1970s–1980s. None of these examined cases involved HIV infection.

== Aftermath ==
Following the publication of the Penrose Inquiry, David Cameron became the first British prime minister to offer a formal apology for the scandal.

No damages were paid during or following the inquiry; indeed, compensation was not mentioned within the terms of reference of the Penrose Inquiry. Damages have, however, been paid in Ireland. On 17 August 2022, the UK government announced that victims of the infected blood scandal across England, Wales, Scotland and Northern Ireland will each receive an interim compensation payment of £100,000.

== See also ==
- Contaminated blood scandal in the United Kingdom
- Contaminated haemophilia blood products
