= Peter Bouckaert =

Peter Bouckaert may refer to:

- Peter Bouckaert (activist), human rights activist
- Peter Bouckaert (producer), Belgian film and television producer.
