= Fereydoun Ala =

Iranian physician and academician

- Born: 17 March 1931 (age 95); Paris, France
- Spouse: Yekta Fazeli
- Children: Arjan (deceased) (from marriage to Ann Pelham Sealy); Souren (from marriage to Ann Pelham Sealy); Tour (from marriage to Ann Pelham Sealy)
- Parent(s): Hossein Ala and Fatemeh Gharagozlou
- Awards: Fellow of the Royal College of Physicians (FRCP) (1970), Fellow of the Royal College of Pathologists (FRCPath) (1991)
- Scientific career
- Fields: Internal Medicine, Haematology, Blood transfusion and Haemostasis, History of Iran

Fereydoun Ala (born 17 March 1931 in Paris, France) is an Iranian physician and academician, specialised in internal medicine, haematology, blood transfusion and haemostasis, who established the first Clinical Haematology Department, and the first Haemophilia Centre in Iran at the Tehran University Medical Faculty. He was the founder of the Iranian National Blood Transfusion Service (INBTS), a centralised, state-funded organisation, established in 1974, for the recruitment of healthy, voluntary, non-remunerated blood donors.

== Family antecedents ==
Dr. Fereydoun Ala's father, Hossein Ala (1883–1964), was a career diplomat, cabinet minister, Minister Plenipotentiary in both Britain and France (ambassadorial status was not established until the 1940s), and twice Iranian envoy to the US (Minister in 1921, and Ambassador in 1945). He played a crucial role in defending Iran's rights as his country's representative at the UN Security Council meetings, during the 'Azarbaijan Crisis' of 1946. Having foiled Soviet-fostered separatist aspirations, he ensured through UN auspices Iran's independence and territorial integrity. In aggregate, he spent twelve years as Minister of the Imperial Court to Mohammad Reza Shah Pahlavi, and was twice appointed Prime Minister.

Hossein Ala's father, Prince Mohammad-Ali Ala' os-Saltaneh (1838–1917), Prime Minister, Foreign Minister and diplomat, was married to Homa Khanom Azemat od-Dowleh, the daughter of the renowned intellectual, Majd ol-Molk Sinaki, four of whose grandsons were to become Prime Ministers: Qavam os-Saltaneh, Vosuq od-Dowleh, Hossein Ala and Ali Amini. Fereydoun Ala's mother Fatemeh, was the only daughter of Abolqasem Khan Gharagozlou Naser ol-Molk (1856–1927), the first Iranian Oxonian (Balliol College, Oxford), sometime Prime Minister and later Regent (1910–1914) while the future Ahmad Shah Qajar was still a minor. He had been raised by his grandfather, Mahmoud Khan Naser ol-Molk Qaragozlou Farmanfarma, who married the daughter of Crown Prince Abbas Mirza, the combative son of Fath-Ali Shah Qajar. During his retirement in Paris, Abolqasem Khan translated two of Shakespeare's plays (Othello and The Merchant of Venice) into lapidary Persian – the first time works of the famous Bard of Avon had been rendered in that language.

== Education ==
Dr. Ala's elementary education was at the Dabestane Nezami primary school (Persian), the Lazariste St. Louis School (French) and the Community School (English), all in Tehran. He went on to begin his secondary education at Harrow School near London towards the end of World War II, which was completed at Milton Academy, near Boston. His college under-graduate studies were at Harvard University, Cambridge, Massachusetts, where he obtained his BA degree in history.

=== Medical education ===
He was then admitted to the University of Edinburgh Medical School in Scotland, and qualified with an MB ChB in 1960. Internship was at the Edinburgh Royal Infirmary, followed by a year as Senior House Officer; and he received a Wellcome Trust research grant under Professor Ronald Girdwood, when he investigated megaloblastic anaemias associated with gastrointestinal malabsorption. He passed the examination for Membership of the Royal College of Physicians (MRCP) in both Internal Medicine and Haematology in 1964, and spent a further year taking the diploma course in 'Practical Haematology' with Professor Sir John Dacie at the Royal Postgraduate Medical School in London. Ala was elected Fellow of the Royal College of Physicians (FRCP) in 1970, and Fellow of the Royal College of Pathologists (FRCPath) in 1991.

== Medical career ==
=== Researcher into haematology ===
Fereydoun Ala definitively returned to Iran in 1965, soon after his father, Hossein Ala, died. He was appointed assistant professor at the Tehran University School of Medicine, Pahlavi (now Khomeini) Hospital in 1965, and was instrumental in establishing the first Clinical Haematology Department in Iran, equipped with its own modern laboratories, thanks to a personal research grant from the Wellcome Trust.

He also established a haemostasis laboratory for the hitherto undiagnosed inherited blood coagulation disorders, such as the haemophilias and von Willebrands Disease. The only available treatment for these potentially crippling bleeding diseases at the time, was frozen fresh plasma and the newly discovered cryoprecipitated Factor VIII concentrate (Judith Pool in 1967), as industrial concentrates were not yet being marketed. Replacement therapy with this primitive, home-made plasma fraction, allowed major orthopaedic, abdominal and thoracic surgery to be carried out with success. Another first was the introduction of hepatitis B surface antigen testing, first described by Baruch Blumberg in 1965. Hepatitis B was a common cause of chronic liver disease in Iran, most particularly among haemophiliacs. In 1971, Ala organised the VIIth Congress of the World Federation of Haemophilia (WFH) in Tehran, the first such meeting held outside Europe or America and Canada. The Proceedings of the meeting, edited by F. Ala and KWE Denson were published by Elseviers, Excerpta Medica (Amsterdam) in 1973. Soon after, the Haemophilia Centre at the Pahlavi (now Emam Khomeini) Hospital was designated an International Haemophilia Treatment Centre (IHTC) by the WFH, one of only a handful of such centres at the time. He was also appointed Medical Secretary WFH, in 1970, as well as a Member of the WFH Medical and Scientific Advisory Committee in 1978.

The dangerously primitive, fragmented state of blood transfusion in Iran, with its exclusive reliance upon blood bought from often addicted and diseased professional donors, drawn from the most deprived sectors of society, spurred Dr. Ala in 1972, to propose the creation of a centralised, state-funded national blood service for the recruitment of healthy, voluntary, non-remunerated donors, and the subsequent collection, testing, processing and distribution of blood and blood products to hospitals free-of-charge, in accordance with modern technical and ethical standards. The object was to take these vital services out of the commercialism of the market-place, and bring them into the realm of altruism and science.

In 1974, a Parliamentary decree established the Iranian National Blood Transfusion Service (INBTS) as an independent legal entity; the Plan Organisation provided funding, and a High Council was appointed, chaired by the HIM Farah, Shahbanu of Iran.

The first step, after procuring a suitable building, purchasing all the myriad items of equipment required, and selecting and training qualified medical, technical and administrative staff, was conducting widespread publicity and blood donor recruitment campaigns, to alter public attitudes towards voluntary donation, and draw public attention to the dangers of current transfusion practice – a significant societal shift. Within a few years, the INBTS became self-sufficient in Tehran, as voluntary donors from every walk of life, provided for the needs of hospitals in the capital. In addition, complementary services, such as blood components, clinical immunology, histocompatibility testing to support the first organ transplant programmes, special and antenatal serology, frozen red cells, and plasma fractionation were added to the spectrum of activities.

Obtaining official support for merging the entirely separate, poorly developed military blood services with the INBTS was a highly significant policy initiative (virtually unique in the Middle East, but for Israel), which provided access to armed forces personnel throughout the country. Ultimately, the Red Lion and Sun Society (latterly renamed the Red Crescent Society) blood centres were also merged with the INBTS.

Following the success of the INBTS in Tehran, regional centres in other major cities, such as Shiraz, Mashhad, Ahvaz, Sari and Hamadan were also established, providing much the same range of services available in the capital, although Tehran fulfilled the role of a national reference and training centre and arbiter of quality.

=== Further career in the United Kingdom (1981 to 1999) ===
In 1981, Fereydoun Ala moved from Iran to the UK, and was appointed medical director of the National Blood Service, West Midlands Region, Senior Lecturer at the Birmingham University Medical Faculty, and Consultant Haematologist at the Queen Elizabeth Hospital. During his tenure, the centre was designated as a 'WHO Collaborating Centre for Training and Development in Blood Transfusion'. His further activities during this period included: Membership of the UK National Blood Transfusion Service Management Committee (1989); Chair of the UKBTS/NIBSC Standing Advisory Committee on Transfusion-Transmitted Infection (1993); his appointment as Councillor to the International Society of Blood Transfusion (ISBT) was renewed in 1998; finally, he was co-editor of 'Transfusion Today' the ISBT Journal.

During this period, he acted as WHO Short-Term consultant in Blood Transfusion to Byelorussia, Cyprus, Djibouti, Egypt, India, Jordan, Kazakhstan, Kyrgyzstan, Lebanon, Pakistan, Syria, Tajikistan, Taiwan, Tunis, United Arab Emirates and Uzbekistan.

== Leading research physician in Iran ==
In 1999, Dr. Ala returned to Iran to organise the biennial WHO Eastern Mediterranean Blood Transfusion Directors' Meeting in Tehran, and thereafter, he has spent a significant part of the year working at the new-found Iranian Comprehensive Haemophilia Care Centre (ICHCC) in Tehran as Honorary President. The ICHCC is a non-governmental, non-profit centre established by the Iranian Hemophilia Society in 2001, dedicated to the diagnosis and management of inherited bleeding and thrombotic disease, and affiliated to the World Federation of Hemophilia. Both the phenotypic and genotypic laboratories participate with success, in the specific external quality control exercises (NEQAS) organised at Sheffield University in the UK, and the Centre effectively acts as a national Reference Centre for haemostatic disorders. The ICHCC offers specialised clinics in dental care, physiotherapy, orthopaedic surgery, gynaecology, psychiatry and hepatology.

The UK-registered Arjan Ala Charitable Trust (AACT) in London, was established by Dr. Ala in 2001 to support the ICHCC with educational grants, as well as to purchase and dispatch laboratory reagents and equipment.

== Personal life ==
Fereydoun Ala married Ann (née Sealy) and they had three sons; one, Arjan died in 1998, following a paragliding accident in Arizona. Ann also died soon after. Fereydoun later married his second wife Yekta Fazeli, only daughter of Lieutenant General Mohammad Fazeli.

== Publications ==
Fereydoun Ala has published some 127 articles and abstracts, as well as a number of chapters and books germane to the fields of blood transfusion and haemostasis.
