= Joe Rosenthal (sculptor) =

Canadian artist

- Born: Joseph Rosenthal; 1921; Chișinău, Romania (now Moldova)
- Died: July 1, 2018 (aged 97)
- Education: Ontario College of Art
- Known for: illustrator, painter, sculptor
- Movement: figurative sculptures

Joe Rosenthal RCA (1921 – July 1, 2018) was a Canadian illustrator, painter and sculptor. He was a member of the Royal Canadian Academy of Arts and the Ontario Society of Artists.

== History ==
Rosenthal was born in 1921 in Romania (now Moldova). He emigrated along with his family to Canada in 1927 at the age of six. By 1935, he was enrolled in the arts program of Toronto’s Central Technical School.

From 1942 to 1945, he served in the Canadian Army, but continued his interest in art throughout his service, producing wartime sketches, posters, and wooden carvings out of gun stocks. In 1943, Rosenthal placed first in an army art exhibition. After his military service, Rosenthal continued his studies at the Ontario College of Art, where he studied printmaking, drawing, painting and sculpture

After finishing his studies, Rosenthal would go on to travel and sketch around the world, visiting the Northwest Territories, Mexico, Cuba, England, the Netherlands, France, Italy, Spain, Greece, Jordan, Israel, and Egypt. Eventually returning to Toronto to begin a career as a freelance illustrator.

In 1969, the Canada Council awarded Rosenthal a grant to go on a three-month tour across Canada where he would go on to produce over 600 drawings of First Nation communities.

== Legacy ==
Many of Rosenthal's bronze sculptures are still installed in public spaces around Canada today. He was awarded recognition by the Art Gallery of Ontario, the Canada Council, and the Toronto Outdoor Exhibition.

He won first prize in the National Open Sculpture Competition for his Monument of Dr. Sun Yat Sen in 1983 and was awarded The Rabin International Presentation Sculpture at Los Angeles in 1996. He latterly lived in Toronto, Ontario, Canada and died in July 2018 at the age of 97 at the Sunnybrook Veterans Centre.

== Family ==
Rosenthal was the brother-in-law of Ross Dowson and was a member of the Revolutionary Workers' Party until the early 1950s when he was part of a split concerning the group's orientation towards the Co-operative Commonwealth Federation. His wife, Joyce Rosenthal (1919-2015), Ross Dowson's sister, was a long-time socialist and an activist in the women's movement, particularly around abortion rights. She co-founded the Ontario chapter of the Canadian Hemophilia Society after discovering that their son, Ron (1950-1982), was a hemophiliac. Their daughter, Susan Rosenthal (born 1949), is a retired physician, psychotherapist, and writer. In 2014, she sued her father over being forced to model for him in the nude when she was a child and adolescent. He was found liable for battery and breach of fiduciary duty and Susan Rosenthal was awarded non-pecuniary damages totalling of $180,000 and pecuniary damages totalling $495,000.

== Works ==
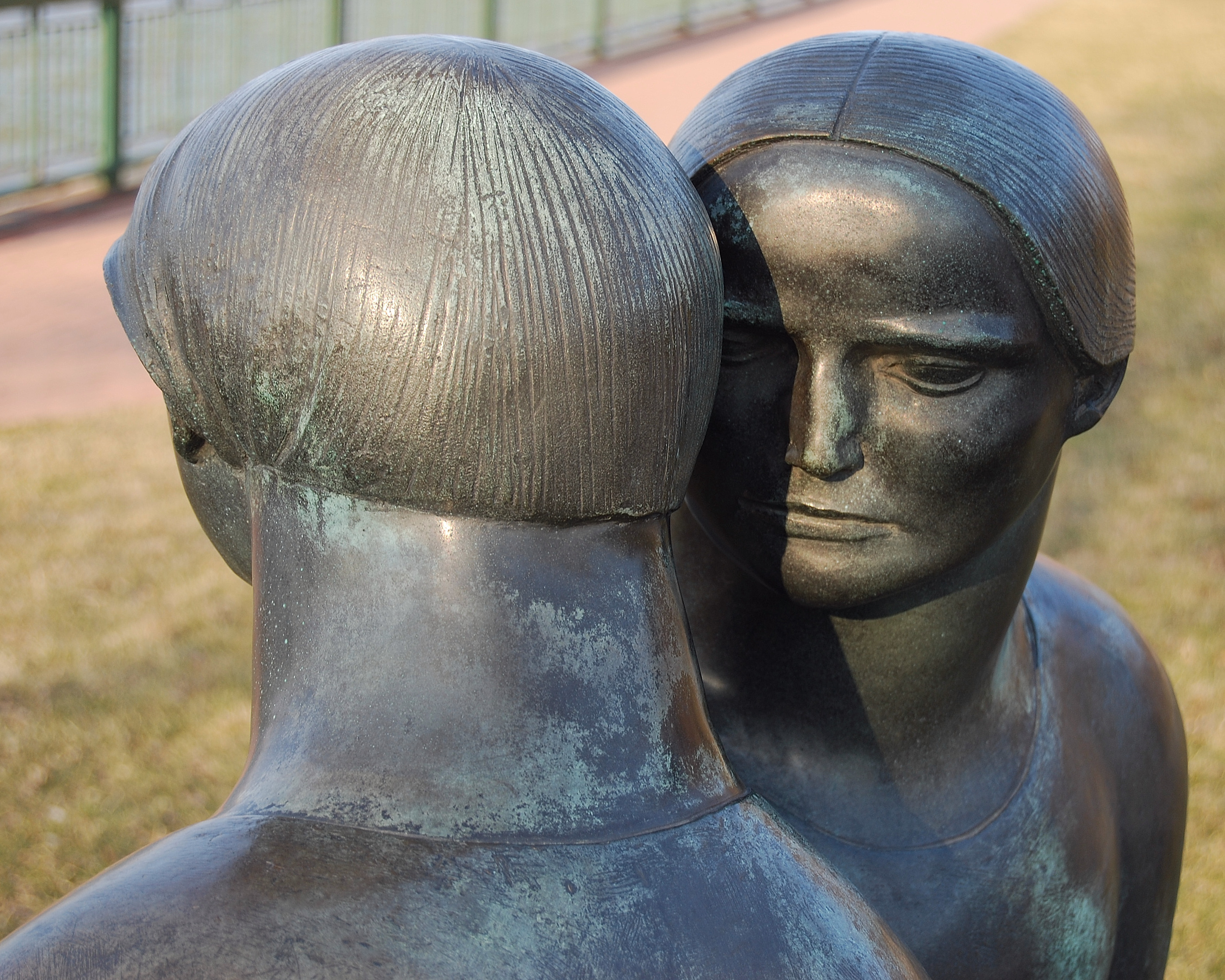
Consolation (detail) in Odette Sculpture Park - Windsor, Ontario/Canada

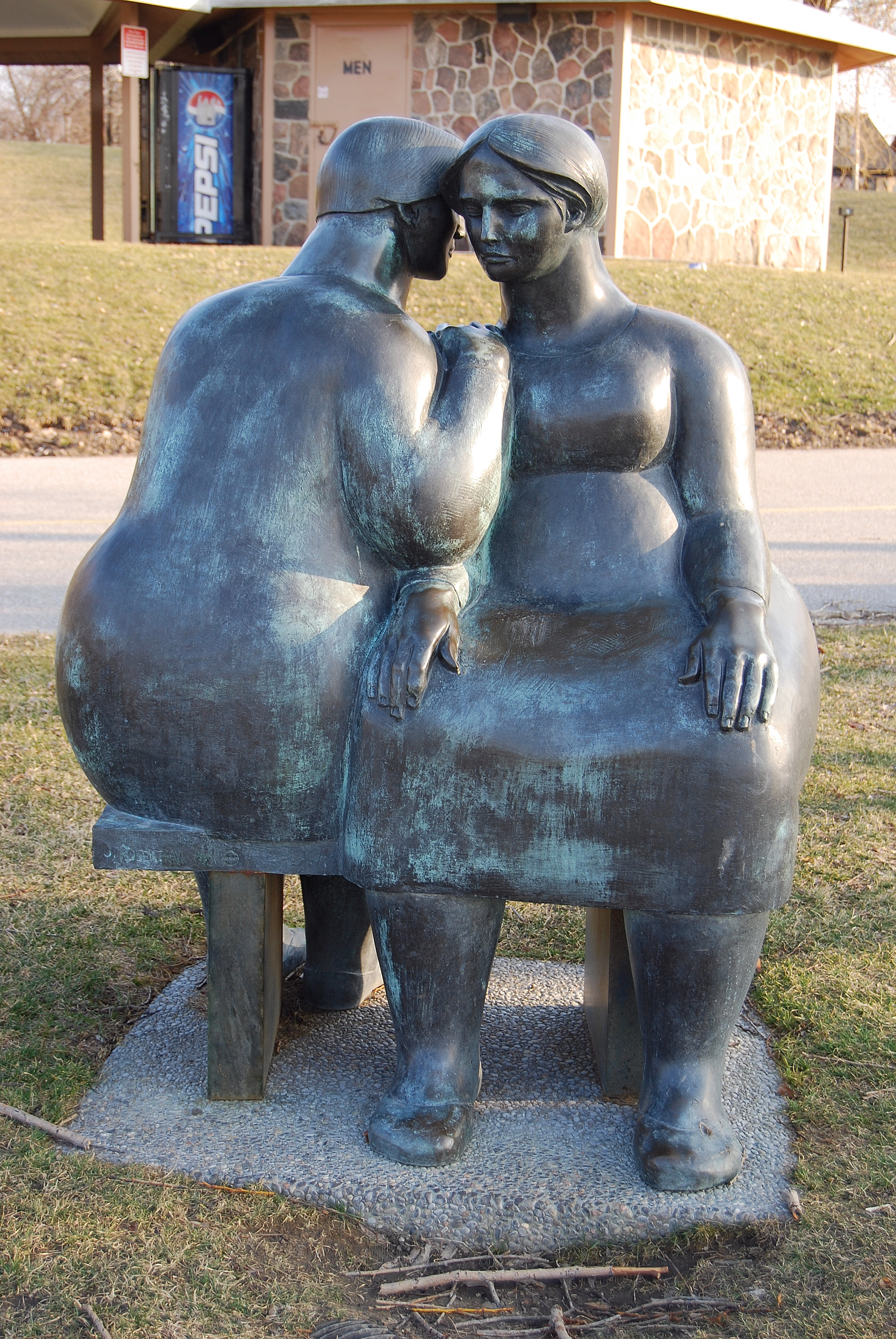
Consolation in Odette Sculpture Park - Windsor, Ontario/Canada

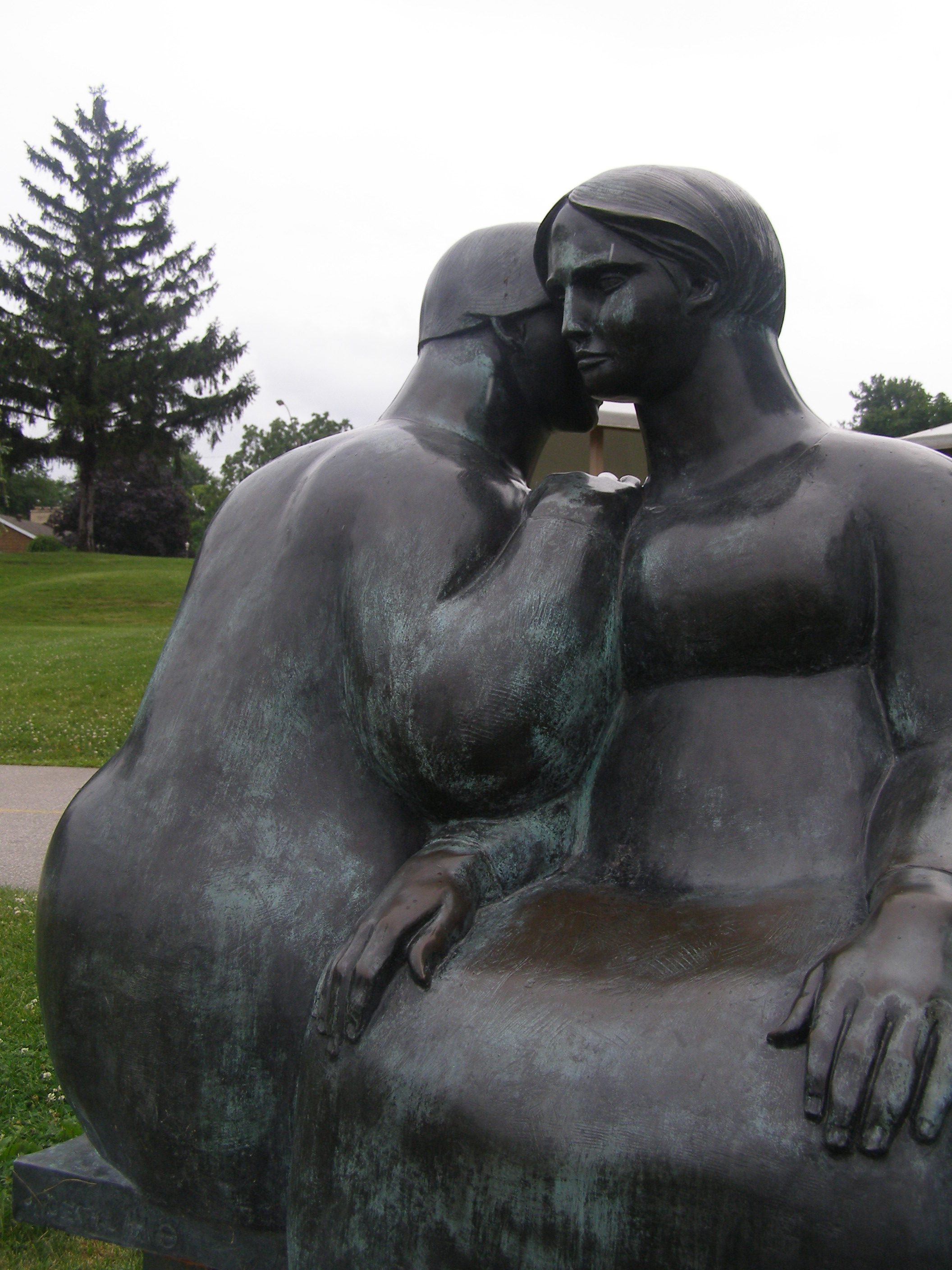
Consolation in Odette Sculpture Park - Windsor, Ontario/Canada

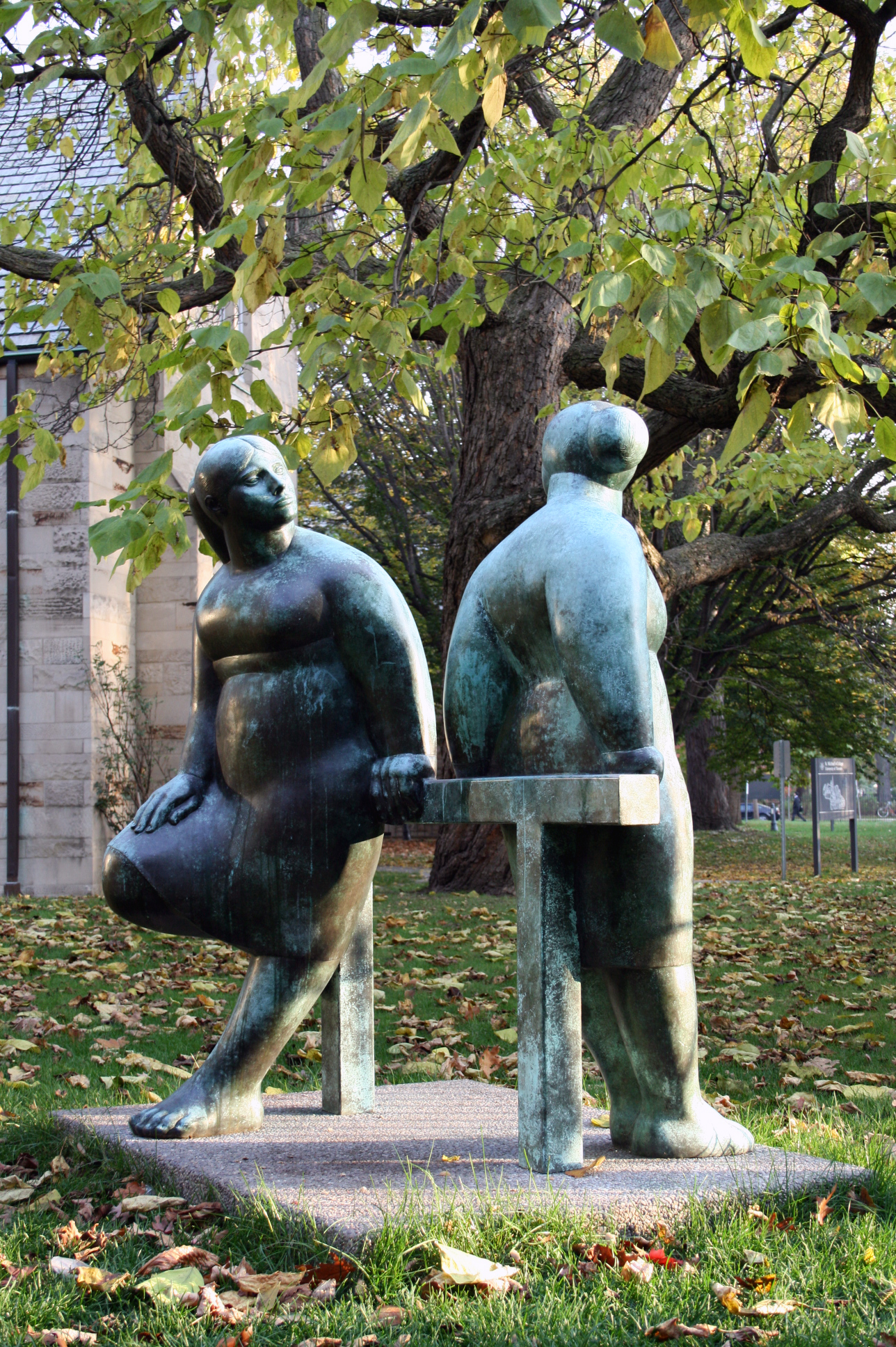
Neighbours at St. Michael's College, University of Toronto

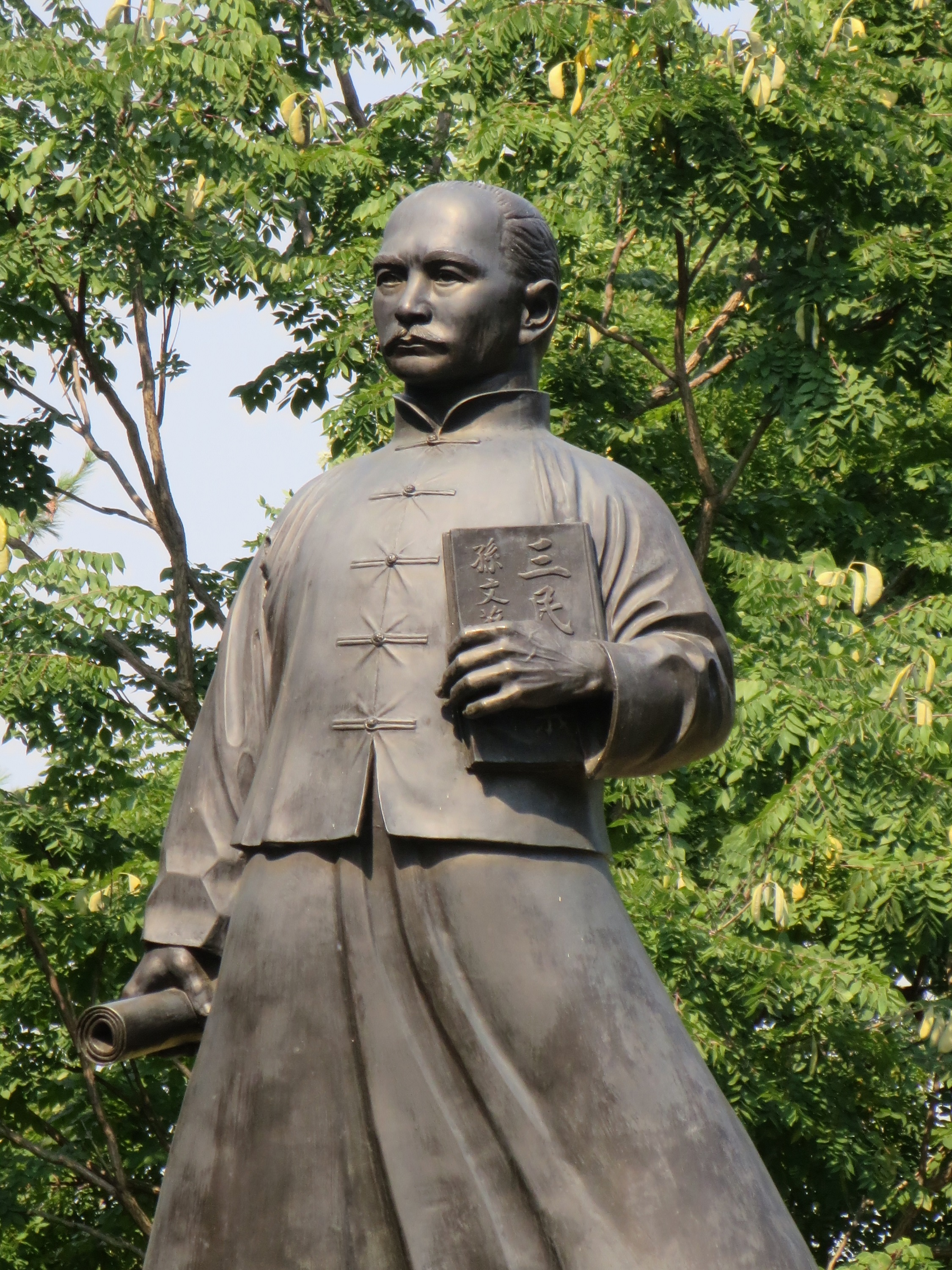
Statue of Sun Yat-sen at Riverdale Park East, Toronto
