= Health Management Associates =

Health Management Associates may refer to one of two unrelated companies:

- Health Management Associates (Florida company), a defunct Florida-based company that operates hospitals and other health care facilities in the southern United States.
- Health Management Associates (Arkansas company), a defunct Arkansas-based company involved in a blood-management scandal during the 1980s.
