= WFH (disambiguation) =

WFH is an initialism for "working from home", also known as remote work.

WFH may also refer to:

- World Federation of Hemophilia, international non-profit organization
- Work for hire, work subject to copyright that is created by an employee as part of their job
- WFH, the Amtrak station code for Whitefish station, Montana, United States
- WFH, the National Rail station code for Watford High Street railway station, Hertfordshire, England
