= Royal Commission of Inquiry on the Blood System in Canada =

Royal commission of inquiry into the tainted blood scandal in Canada

Krever Commission
- Part of Contaminated haemophilia blood products
- Date: late 1970s – 1980s
- Location: Canada
- Also known as: Tainted blood scandal
- Type: public health crisis and scandal
- Outcome: creation of Héma-Québec and Canadian Blood Services
- Deaths: 8,000
- Inquiries: Commission of Inquiry on the Blood System in Canada
- Inquiry report: Final report of the Krever Inquiry
- Infections: 30,000 Canadians infected with hepatitis C; 2,000 Canadians infected with HIV

The Commission of Inquiry on the Blood System in Canada, more commonly referred to as the Krever Commission or Krever Inquiry, was a royal commission of inquiry into the tainted blood scandal, investigating how the Canadian Red Cross and the provincial and federal governments allowed contaminated blood into the healthcare system.

The blood scandal, was a Canadian public health crisis in the 1980s in which thousands of people were exposed to HIV and hepatitis C through contaminated blood products. It became apparent that inadequately-screened blood, often coming from high-risk populations, was entering the system through blood transfusions. It is now considered to be the largest single (preventable) public health disaster in the history of Canada.

Established by the Canadian Government in October 1993 and headed by Justice Horace Krever, the Krever Commission is one of the most high-profile public inquiries in Canadian history and is seen as bringing the scandal into the public eye.

Over 30,000 Canadians were infected with hepatitis C between 1980 and 1990 and approximately 2,000 Canadians were infected with HIV between 1980 and 1985. Around 8,000 of those who received tainted blood died or are expected to die as a result. Some blood products were also sent abroad, infecting people in Japan, Germany, and Britain.

== Background and crisis ==
Since the 1940s, blood supply in Canada had largely been the responsibility of the Canadian Red Cross Society. This independent charitable body supplied donated blood to hospitals or, if the blood was past its expiry date, gave it to Connaught Laboratories, the major producer of blood products in Canada. Connaught had initially been a non-profit company operated by the University of Toronto; by the 1980s it had been sold into the private sector. The Canadian Red Cross set the standards for health and safety in the collection, testing, storage, and distribution of blood and its components until 1989.

In 1981, the Canadian Blood Committee was created by the provincial ministers of health and funded the Red Cross's blood transfusion service.

In 1984, some major blood banks in the United States began to use a new test, called surrogate testing, to screen blood for hepatitis B, an indicator of HIV. However, the Canadian Red Cross did not follow suit. It was not until 1985 that the Red Cross began screening and testing donated blood for HIV; meantime, another virus made its way into the blood system: Hepatitis C.

In November 1985, the Canadian Red Cross Society began testing all donated blood for the presence of the antibody associated with HIV. In 1986 and 1987, though Factor VIII concentrate was heat-treated to kill HIV, the treatment was faulty and seven children were infected. The Canadian Hemophilia Society demanded the product be pulled, but the Red Cross refused. According to one estimate, about 133 cases of HIV transmission via blood products took place between March and November 1985. Moreover, a test to screen blood for hepatitis C was made available in 1986, but the Red Cross did not begin using it on donated blood until 1990. As of December 1989, around 1,250 Canadians, many of them hemophiliacs, were known to have contracted HIV through blood products.

Once the extent of infection was known, the Red Cross failed to track down those who had received tainted blood so that they could receive treatment and avoid passing on the viruses to others.

== Inquiry ==
In November 1992, a parliamentary committee called the Commons Sub-Committee on Health Issues began to examine the tainted blood scandal. In May 1993, having heard from over 30 witnesses, the Committee recommended a full-scale inquiry. Likewise, on 16 September 1993, the federal, provincial, and territorial ministers of health, except for the Minister of Health of Quebec, recommended that a public inquiry be established. That month, the Government of Canada announced a full-scale, CA$2.5-million inquiry into the tainted-blood crisis.

Order in Council PC 1993-1879 was issued on 4 October 1993, and the Commission of Inquiry on the Blood System in Canada was issued on October 27, appointing Justice Horace Krever as chair.

The goal of the inquiry was "to review and report on the mandate, organization, management, operations, financing and regulation of all activities of the blood system in Canada, including the events surrounding the contamination of the blood system in Canada in the early 1980s." This was to be achieved by examining "the organization and effectiveness of past and current systems designed to supply blood and blood products in Canada; the roles, views, and ideas of relevant interest groups; and the structures and experiences of other countries, especially those with comparable federal systems."

The Commission would end up fighting various pitched legal battles with federal government, mainly over its right to name publicly those who had failed in their duties. In the process, the Commission redefined the role of public inquiries in Canada.

=== Hearings ===
Preliminary and public hearings in the inquiry took over 2 years. The Commission heard from 474 people and 89 written submissions.

Organizational hearings were held in Ottawa, Ontario, on 22 and 23 November 1993. At those hearings the following parties received standing:

- the Red Cross;
- the Canadian Blood Agency;
- the governments of Canada, nine provinces, and the territories;
- Connaught Laboratories;
- Miles Canada Inc. (later Bayer Inc.); and
- nine organizations, including the Canadian Hemophilia Society and the Canadian AIDS Society, that represented persons who had been infected with HIV or hepatitis C by blood, blood components, or blood products, and other persons interested in the contamination of the blood supply in the 1980s.

The first phase of public hearings was conducted between February and December 1994 in every province except Prince Edward Island, for which evidence was heard in Halifax, Nova Scotia. In addition to infected persons or members of their families, those who testified in this phase included employees of local Red Cross blood centres, provincial government officials, and representatives of community and AIDS-related organizations; in total, 315 witnesses testified during the first phase of public hearings.

The second phase of public hearings addressed broader national concerns regarding the historical actions and relationships of the participants in the Canadian blood system. These hearings took place in Toronto, Ontario, between March and November 1995, equating to over 100 days of hearings with 84 witnesses testifying in total.

The third phase of public hearings addressed the organization of the blood system current to the time. In this phase, which took place in Toronto during November and December 1995, round-table discussions were held on issues affecting the blood system; case studies were conducted with the cooperation of the major organizations in the system (the Canadian Red Cross Society, the Canadian Blood Agency, the Government of Canada, the Canadian Hemophilia Society, and the Association of Hemophilia Clinic Directors of Canada) to examine what changes had been made to their decision-making processes since the 1980s; and presentations were made by the major organizations regarding the current blood system.

== Report and fallout ==
In 1989, the Government of Canada provided CA$120,000 in "humanitarian assistance" to victims of tainted blood in exchange for a guarantee that they would not sue. In 1993, the provinces extended the compensation plan, offering $30,000 annually to all those who had contracted the AIDS virus from blood.

In April 1996, the provincial and federal ministers of health met to begin the reform of the Canadian blood system, agreeing that a safe, integrated, accountable, and transparent national blood system was needed.

The Krever Commission tabled its report in the House of Commons on 26 November 1997. It estimated that 85% of the 30,000 hepatitis C infections from blood transfusions between 1986 and 1990 could have been prevented. Krever concluded that the Canadian government failed to take precautionary screening and testing measures to protect Canada's blood supply. The inquiry also uncovered cost-cutting attempts, which favoured for-profit paid-plasma schemes; cover-ups; and widespread political interference; as well as negligent importation of blood collected from high-risk American donors.

The Report suggested that the Canadian blood system should be governed by 5 principles:

- blood is a public resource;
- no one should be paid to donate blood or plasma;
- Canada should collect enough blood and components to satisfy its own needs;
- citizens should have free and universal access to blood components and products; and
- safety of the blood supply is paramount.

The new system, Canadian Blood Services, began operations in September 1998, replacing the Canadian Blood Agency (formerly the Canadian Blood Commission), which was disbanded as result of the inquiry. However, the province of Quebec did not agree to be part of a national blood system. Instead, it set up its own parallel provincial service, Héma-Québec. Both agencies would operate at arm's length from the federal government.

The Report also made recommendations regarding no-fault compensation for persons who had received contaminated blood. On 27 March 1998, Health Minister Allan Rock held a press conference to release details about the federal government’s compensation package, only offering compensation to victims who were infected between 1986 and 1990.

The fallout from the scandal also led to the restructuring of the Bureau of Biologics, the division of Health Canada that was responsible for monitoring blood safety.

In April 2001, the Supreme Court of Canada found the Canadian Red Cross guilty of negligence for failing to screen blood donors effectively for HIV infection.

Less than a month after the Krever Report was released, the RCMP launched a five-year investigation into the tainted blood disaster. In 2002, the RCMP laid 32 charges in total against two senior bureaucrats at Health Canada, the head of the Red Cross' blood program, and a vice-president of Armour Pharmaceutical, a New Jersey company that manufactures Factor VIII concentrate for use by hemophiliacs. The company itself was also charged, as was the Canadian Red Cross Society.

On 30 May 2005, the Red Cross pleaded guilty to violating the Food and Drug Regulation Act by distributing an adulterated or contaminated drug. It was fined $5,000, which was the maximum penalty for the offence under the Act. The criminal charges were dropped.

On 25 July 2006, the Canadian government announced a nearly $1-billion compensation package for 5,500 people—the "forgotten victims" who contracted hepatitis C before January 1, 1986 and after July 1, 1990.

The crisis and subsequent scandal have led to nearly $10 billion in legal claims.

== See also ==
- Unspeakable — an 8-episode CBC Television drama series on the tainted blood scandal.
- Contaminated haemophilia blood products
- Health Management Associates scandal
- Factor 8: The Arkansas Prison Blood Scandal
- Contaminated blood scandal in the United Kingdom
