= Infected blood scandal in France =

Medical scandal in France

In April 1991, the doctor and journalist Anne-Marie Casteret published an article in the French weekly magazine the L'Événement du jeudi showing that the Centre National de Transfusion Sanguine knowingly distributed blood products contaminated with HIV to haemophiliacs in 1984 and 1985, leading to an outbreak of HIV/AIDS and hepatitis C in numerous countries. It is estimated that 6,000 to 10,000 haemophiliacs were infected in the United States alone. In France, 4,700 people were infected, and over 300 died. Other impacted countries include Canada, Iran, Iraq, Ireland, Italy, Japan, Portugal, and the United Kingdom.

== Background ==
On January 8, 1985, multi-national health care company Abbott Laboratories sought authorisation to sell equipment needed for blood testing. Response to the demand was delayed as the government was waiting for a rival French test to be released. So they continued to use the old unheated product in 1985, while the heated stock was available. In 1992, Anne-Marie Casteret published a book Blood scandal (L'affaire du sang) which refuted the argument that nobody was aware in 1985 that the heating of blood made the virus inactive. The book included evidence that as early as 1983, researchers had put forth this assumption.

== Lawsuits ==
In 1999, the former socialist Prime Minister Laurent Fabius, former Social Affairs Minister Georgina Dufoix and former Health Minister Edmond Hervé were charged with "manslaughter". The Cour de Justice de la République found Edmond Hervé guilty, and acquitted Fabius and Dufoix. Although Hervé was found guilty, he received no sentence.

Dr M. Garretta, the director of National Blood Center (central national de transfusion sanguine), however, was sentenced a four year prison; and became known as the symbol of Blood Scandal among the French.

== Precautionary measures ==
After the blood scandal, neither scientists, nor governors were fully trusted. Measures have been taken in order to bring back public trust, such as forcing regulators to replace a Consensus model of making decisions with a new model named deliberately-transparent one, in Europe. This new model includes new ingredients: to encourage a greater public participation in policy-making decisions. It requires regulators to be more transparent, and also to take more precautionary measures in European countries, even in unlikely hazards like the risk of mobile radiations.

== See also ==
- Contaminated haemophilia blood products, which discusses the scandal on a global scale
- Contaminated blood scandal in the United Kingdom
- Bad Blood: A Cautionary Tale
