= Factor 8: The Arkansas Prison Blood Scandal =

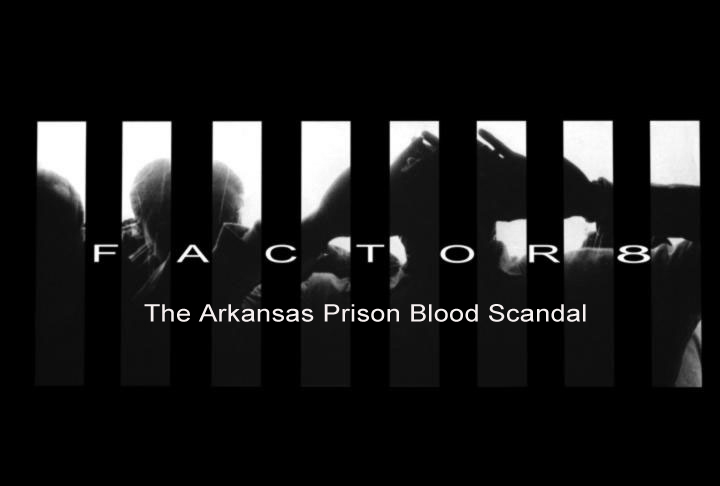
- Directed by: Kelly Duda
- Produced by: Kelly Duda
- Starring: Edwin Barron Jr. John Byus; Kelly Duda; Hezile Earl; Francis ′Bud′ Henderson; Rolf Kaestel; Mark Kennedy; James Kreppner; Jim Lovel; Randal Morgan; John Schock
- Narrated by: Kelly Duda
- Cinematography: Kelly Duda, Clinton Steeds, Jon Ruffiner
- Edited by: Kelly Duda
- Music by: Nick Devlin; The Salty Dogs
- Distributed by: Concrete Films USA
- Release date: 2005
- Running time: 91 minutes
- Country: United States of America
- Language: English

Factor 8: The Arkansas Prison Blood Scandal is a feature-length documentary by Arkansas filmmaker and investigative journalist, Kelly Duda, released in 2005. Through interviews and the presentation of documents and footage, Duda alleged that in the 1970s and 1980s, the Arkansas prison system profited from selling blood plasma from inmates infected with viral hepatitis and HIV. The documentary contends that thousands of victims who received transfusions of blood products derived from these plasma products, Factor VIII, died as a result.

== Summary ==
Factor 8 examines a prison blood-harvesting scheme run by Arkansas prisons for profit. The blood was sold by blood companies for millions of dollars. The harvested plasma was then shipped around the world, where it infected haemophilia patients. This is shown with interviews of former prisoners and employees and the presentation of documents and footage. The film demonstrates how leaders in the prison system falsified prisoners’ medical records, and nothing was done even though needles were shared by the prisoners. A deputy director of the department of corrections from 1981 to 1996 is quoted as saying that Bill Clinton must have known that the plasma programme was experiencing problems.

== Release ==
Factor 8: The Arkansas Prison Blood Scandal was screened at Slamdance 2005 and at the American Film Institute′s Los Angeles Film Festival in November 2005. It won a special mention award at AFI and received a commendable review from critic John Anderson in the industry newspaper Variety.

A screening of the film was held in Soho, London on May 5, 2006. On May 9, 2006, AIDS victims demonstrated against former US president Bill Clinton, who had been Governor of Arkansas when the blood factor sales had taken place, during his visit to Glasgow. The British premiere of Factor 8 was held on September 29, 2006, as part of the 14th Raindance Film Festival in Piccadilly Circus, London.

== Reception and impact ==
Prison Legal News called it a "straight-for-the-throat film". Variety called Factor 8 "hard-headed journalism practiced by a filmmaker who sometimes seems like a pit bull with a bureaucratic bone. He follows subjects fearlessly and ventures into hostile environs but comes away, most of the time, with the information he wants to get."

An assistant warden at the Cummins Unit, who talked to Canadian reporters about the blood program was later shot by an "escaped" prisoner.

After Cummins Unit prisoner Rolf Kaestel had given testimony in Duda’s documentary, state corrections officials relocated him to Utah. Duda alleged that this was in retribution for his comments, calling Kaestel a, "political prisoner", and an Arkansas Assistant Attorney General admitted this was in retaliation. Kaestel was paroled in 2021 after serving 40 years of his life imprisonment without parole sentence for robbing a taco hut with a water pistol of $264 in Fort Smith, Arkansas, in 1981. The victim, Dennis Schluterman, who was not harmed in the crime, had said for years that Kaestel should be freed. Kaestel also had a contingent of high profile supporters that includes actress and MeToo activist Rose McGowan, CNN commentator Van Jones, music executive Jason Flom, and GOP fundraiser Jack Oliver.

On November 3, 2005, Carolyn Leckie, Member of Scottish Parliament (MSP), submitted a motion recognizing the need for a wide audience for Factor 8: The Arkansas Prison Blood Scandal, which 22 MSPs signed. The motion also called for a full independent public inquiry into what led to the infections and what the response should be. In May 2007, they announced an impending inquiry into tainted blood.

On July 11, 2007, Duda testified at the Lord Archer Inquiry on Contaminated Blood in Westminster, United Kingdom. Duda spoke on the United States' (and Arkansas's) role in the events. He also met with UK investigators and submitted written testimony in 2020 to the Infected Blood Inquiry—a five-year public investigation into the UK’s tainted blood scandal—which ultimately recommended compensation for the victims.

== See also ==
- Bad Blood: A Cautionary Tale
- Contaminated haemophilia blood products
- Health Management Associates (Arkansas company)
- Royal Commission of Inquiry on the Blood System in Canada
