= Ross Kauffman =

American film producer

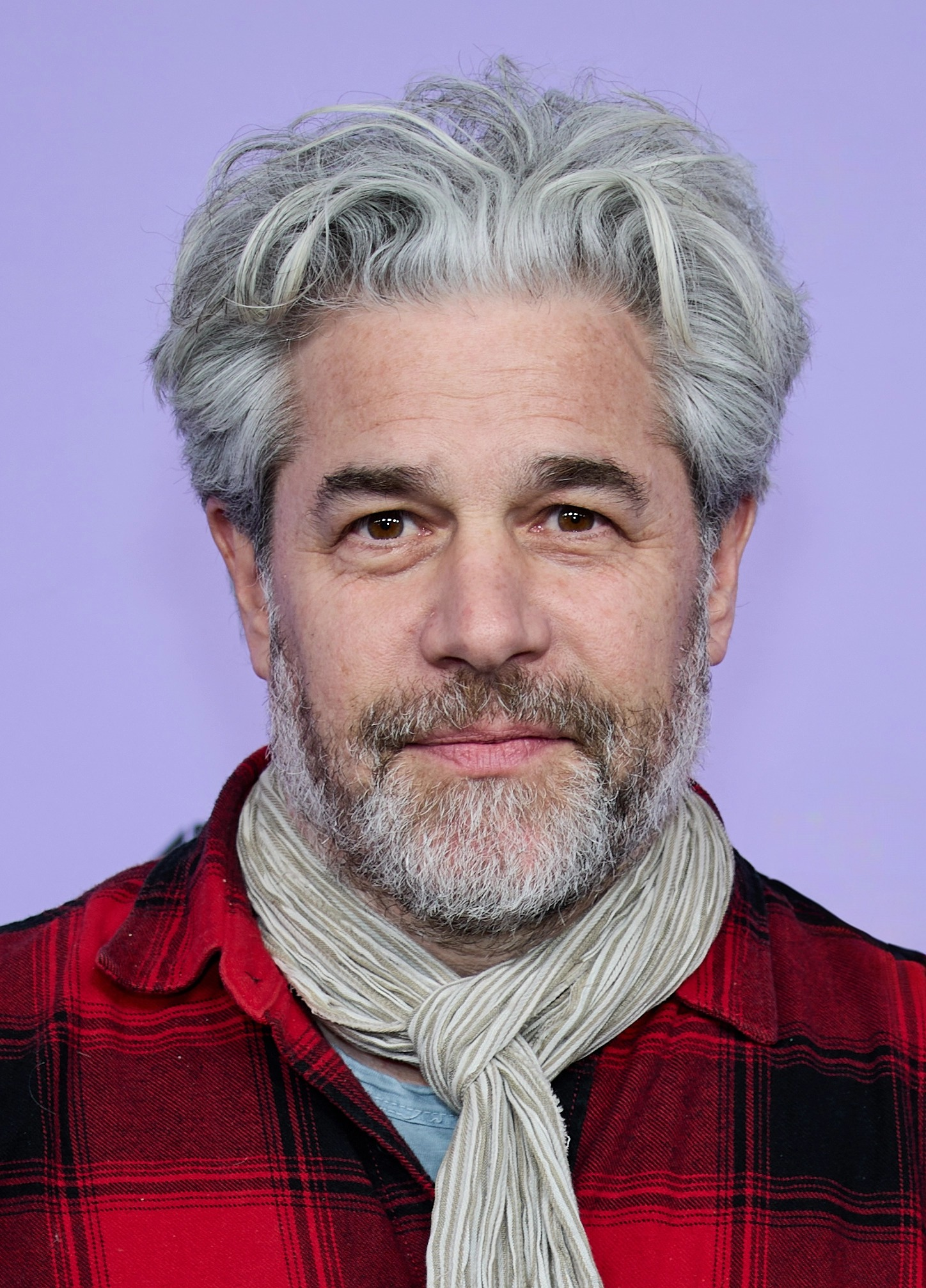
- Ross Kauffman at Sundance Film Festival 2024
- Occupations: Film director, producer, cinematographer

Ross Kauffman is an American film director, producer, and cinematographer. He has directed Born into Brothels (2004), which won the Academy Award for Best Documentary Feature Film, E-Team (2014), Of Medicine and Miracles (2022) and Wild Wild Space (2024).

== Career ==
In 2004, Kauffman co-directed alongside Zana Briski, edited, and served as cinematographer on Born into Brothels, which had its world premiere at the 2004 Sundance Film Festival in January 2004, and was released by ThinkFilm and HBO Documentary Films in December 2004. The film went onto win Academy Award for Best Documentary Feature Film.

In 2014, Kauffman directed, produced, and served as cinematographer on E-Team alongside Katy Chevigny, which had its world premiere at the 2014 Sundance Film Festival and was acquired by Netflix.

In 2019, Kauffman directed, produced, and served as cinematographer on Tigerland produced by Fisher Stevens, for Discovery Channel. In 2021, Kauffman directed the short film What Would Sophia Loren Do? for Netflix.

In 2022, Kauffman directed Of Medicine and Miracles which had its world premiere at the Tribeca Festival in June 2022. In 2024, Kauffman directed Wild Wild Space for HBO.

Kauffman has also directed the short films Still Plays with Trains, Waterproof, and Winding Path.
