= Canadian Hemophilia Society =

Canadian non-profit organization

- Founded: 1953
- Founder: Frank Schnabel, Joyce Rosenthal
- Type: Health Advocacy Group
- Location: Montreal, Quebec, Canada
- Region served: Canada
- Revenue: Non-Profit Organization
- Website: http://www.hemophilia.ca

The Canadian Hemophilia Society (CHS) also known as Bleeding Disorders Canada (BDC) is a non-profit organization whose stated mission is to lead the fight against inherited bleeding disorders by helping people affected live healthy lives while simultaneously raising public awareness and funding research. The organization consists of chapters in every province in Canada. It was originally named for the blood disease hemophilia.

== History ==
The organization was founded in 1953 in Montreal, Canada by Frank Schnabel as a support group between physicians and hemophiliacs. The organization grew quickly within the next decade, with the founding of the Ontario chapter in 1957 by Joyce Rosenthal, followed by the Quebec chapter in 1959. By 1969, all Canadian Provinces had an active CHS chapter

With the improvement of Hemophilia treatment by the 1990s, CHS branched out to focus on more genetically inherited blood diseases such as von Willebrand disease, platelet function disorders and rare factor deficiencies. In February 2026, CEO Sarah Ford announced that the parent organization would be renamed to Bleeding Disorders Canada in order to represent a larger range of bleeding disorders.

== Organization ==
The organization has its national headquarters in Montreal Canada, with 10 chapters managed by their own board of directors on a provincial level. There are approximately 300 active volunteers throughout the organization across Canada. The CHS is closely affiliated with the World Federation of Hemophilia.

As of 2026, the current president of the board of directors is Emil Wijnker

== Activities ==
CHS was active during the 1980s tainted blood scandal, criticizing the failure of the Canadian Red Cross Society to properly test donated blood. Later during the 1993 Krever Inquiry that followed, CHS was one of nine organizations that represented persons who had been infected with HIV by contamination of blood or blood products, seeking legal compensation.

The organization has additionally been actively involved in funding and supporting research programs focused on developing treatments and potential cures for bleeding disorders though grants.

- CHS Dream of a Cure Research Program
- CHS – Pfizer Care until Cure Research Program
- CHS – Novo Nordisk Canada Psychosocial Research Program
- CHS – Bayer – ADVANCE Canada Research Program

CHS also offers multiple academic scholarships for Canadians with inherited bleeding disorders

== See also ==
- World Federation of Hemophilia
