= Wild Wild Space =

2024 documentary film

- Release poster
- Directed by: Ross Kauffman
- Produced by: Jaye Callahan; Ashlee Vance; Adam McKay; Todd Schulman; Justin Falvey; Darryl Frank; Christopher Collins; Lydia Tenaglia; Craig H. Shepherd
- Cinematography: Ed David; Ross Kauffman; Jonathan Furmanski
- Edited by: Hypatia Porter
- Music by: Gil Talmi
- Production companies: HBO Documentary Films; Amblin Documentaries; Hyperobject Industries; Zero Point Zero Production
- Distributed by: HBO
- Release dates: June 14, 2024 (DC/DOX); July 17, 2024 (United States)
- Running time: 95 minutes
- Country: United States
- Language: English

Wild Wild Space is a 2024 American documentary film, directed by Ross Kauffman. Inspired by the book When the Heavens Went on Sale by Ashlee Vance, it follows the quests of three rocket and satellite companies Astra Space, Rocket Lab, and Planet Labs.

It had its world premiere at DC/DOX Film Festival on June 14, 2024, and was released on July 17, 2024, by HBO.

== Premise ==
Explores the quests of the rocket and satellite companies Astra Space, Rocket Lab, and Planet Labs.

== Production ==
After reading the book When Heavens Went on Sale by Ashlee Vance and enjoying its tone, Ross Kauffman wanted to make a documentary. Adam McKay serves as a producer under his Hyperobject Industries banner.

== Release ==
It had its world premiere at DC/DOX Film Festival on June 14, 2024. It was released on July 17, 2024 on HBO Max.

== Reception ==
On the review aggregator website Rotten Tomatoes, 88% of 8 critics' reviews are positive, with an average rating of 6.5/10.

Richard Roeper of Chicago Sun-Times gave the film three out of four stars, writing: "At times it’s a bit murky in presentation and we get bogged down in all the geek talk, but on balance, this is a timely and informative work."
