= The Easy Kind =

2024 American drama film

- Theatrical release poster
- Directed by: Katy Chevigny
- Written by: Katy Chevigny
- Produced by: Katy Chevigny; Peter Gilbert; Nikhil Melnechuk; Natalie Farrey
- Starring: Elizabeth Cook; Melissa Jackson; Zebedee Row; Donal Brophy; Catherine Curtin; Susie Essman; David Letterman; Karen Allen; Charles Esten
- Cinematography: Emily Topper
- Edited by: Curtis Grout; Rodrigo Brazão
- Production companies: Big Mouth Productions; Forager Films; Mystic Entertainment; Love Today Productions
- Distributed by: Persimmon
- Release dates: August 30, 2024 (Telluride); June 3, 2026 (United States)
- Running time: 94 minutes
- Country: United States
- Language: English
- Box office: $14,789

The Easy Kind is an 2024 American drama film written, directed, and produced by Katy Chevigny. It stars Elizabeth Cook, Melissa Jackson, Zebedee Row, Donal Brophy, Catherine Curtin, Susie Essman, David Letterman, Karen Allen and Charles Esten.

It had its world premiere at the 51st Telluride Film Festival on August 30, 2024, and is scheduled to be released on June 3, 2026, by Persimmon.

== Premise ==
EC, a singer-songwriter, navigates the personal and professional complexities of midlife.

== Cast ==
- Elizabeth Cook as EC
- Melissa Jackson as Ricky
- Zebedee Row as Clay
- Donal Brophy as Charlie
- Catherine Curtin as Meg
- Susie Essman as Janice
- David Letterman as Dave
- Karen Allen as Kathy
- Charles Esten as Tye

== Production ==
Principal photography took place in Georgia, Nashville, and New York. It received support from the Catapult Film Fund.

== Release ==
It had its world premiere at the 51st Telluride Film Festival on August 30, 2024. It also screened at the RiverRun International Film Festival, and the Woods Hole Film Festival. In April 2026, Persimmon acquired distribution rights to the film, and set it for a June 3, 2026, release, prior to video on demand in August.
