= Charm City (film) =

Crime documentary film

- Directed by: Marilyn Ness
- Produced by: Marilyn Ness; Katy Chevigny
- Cinematography: Andre Lambertson; John Benam
- Edited by: Don Bernier
- Music by: Todd Griffin
- Release date: 2018

Charm City is a 2018 crime documentary film directed by Marilyn Ness. The film follows a community in Baltimore, Maryland, over the span of three years of high violence. The film primarily focuses on two threads: the governmental response to the violence—both by the police and the city council—and the citizens' response and the community groups they form.

The film debuted at the 2018 Tribeca Film Festival and Maryland Film Festival before a wider release.

== Cast ==
- Clayton "Mr. C" Guyton
- Alex Long
- Major Monique Brown
- Officer Eric Winston
- Officer John Gregorio
- Councilman Brandon Scott

== Release ==
=== Critical response ===
On the review aggregator Rotten Tomatoes, the film holds an approval rating of 100% based on 16 reviews, with an average rating of 8.06/10. Metacritic, which uses a weighted average, assigned the film a score of 85 out of 100, based on five critics, indicating "universal acclaim". The film was on the short list for the Academy Award for Best Documentary Feature.

Ben Kenigsberg writing for the New York Times wrote, "The film captures up close the way violence transforms neighborhoods and families with an immediacy that transcends headlines or sensationalism."
