= Cour de justice de la République =

Special French court established to try cases of ministerial misconduct

Coordinates: 48°51′34″N 2°18′53″E

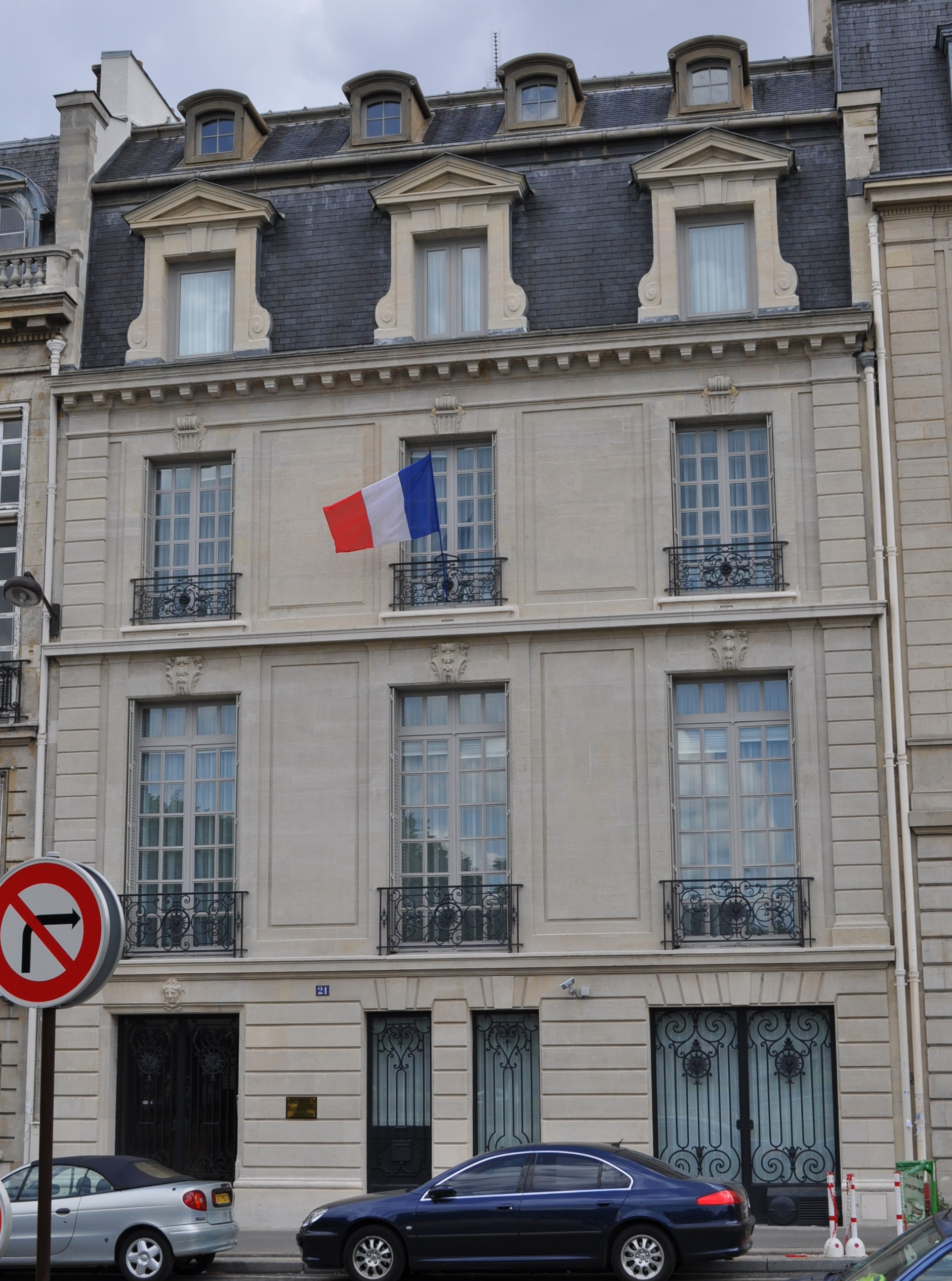
Building of the Cour de Justice in Paris

The Cour de justice de la République (CJR, "Court of Justice of the Republic") is a special French court established to try cases of ministerial misconduct. Its remit only extends to government ministers (or former ministers) concerning offences committed in the exercise of their functions. It was instituted by President François Mitterrand on 27 July 1993 following the infected blood scandal, which saw three ministers, including then-Prime Minister Laurent Fabius, charged with manslaughter. Before that, ministers in France benefitted from a degree of judicial immunity. As of 2020, the court has formally charged ten ministers since it was established; five were found guilty.

French ministers can still be tried in a regular French court, if the alleged offence is not related to their ministerial duties. Notably, Interior Minister Brice Hortefeux was fined in 2010 for making racial slurs. On 3 July 2017 President Emmanuel Macron announced his intention to abolish the court to have ministers tried by a regular Paris court, criticising the composition of the CJR. For the same reasons, in 2022, a public consultation on the French justice system (États généraux de la Justice) led to the recommendation to abolish the CJR.

== Composition ==
Ministers tried before the CJR are heard by a fifteen-judge panel made up of three justices of the Court of Cassation and twelve parliamentarians: six each from the National Assembly and Senate.

The tribunal's composition has been criticised on grounds of partiality, since the twelve parliamentarians are likely to be colleagues, or at least acquaintances, of the ministers on trial. Even one of the court's former presidents, Henri-Claude Le Gall (2000–2011), has commented: "Very often the judges, whether senators or assemblymen, know the ministers they are passing judgement on very well, so they have a lot of trouble remaining detached and judging objectively."

== Proceedings ==
Complaints against ministers or former ministers are lodged with the CJR's Petitions Commission, made up of seven justices drawn from the Supreme Court, the Council of State, and the Court of Audit. Anyone can lodge a complaint.

If the Petitions Commission considers the case worth pursuing, the case moves to another body called the Inquest Commission, consisting of three Supreme Court justices who then conduct an inquest into the circumstances of the alleged offence. After investigation, the case is either dismissed or the minister is called before the court.

However, in practice it is rare for a minister to go to trial. Of more than 1,000 complaints lodged since the CJR was created in 1993, only 38 were passed on to the Inquest Commission, and only six of those ever went to trial. Three guilty verdicts have been handed down.

== Cases ==
Two cases are currently under investigation by the CJR. The first concerns Éric Wœrth, who is being investigated for "unlawful conflict of interests" over the sale of a racecourse while he was budget minister. Then on 4 August 2011, the Petitions Commission said they would also greenlight an investigation into former finance minister Christine Lagarde over concerns about her part in a long-running scandal connected to the French tycoon Bernard Tapie. Other significant cases are:

- In 1999, the CJR tried former prime minister Laurent Fabius, former social affairs minister Georgina Dufoix, and former health secretary Edmond Hervé for their role in the ‘infected blood’ scandal. Fabius and Dufoix were found not guilty; Hervé was convicted but not given any punishment.
- In 2000, Ségolène Royal was acquitted of libel charges.
- In July 2004, former minister for disabilities Michel Gillibert was given a three-year suspended prison sentence for fraud.
- In April 2011, former minister of the interior Charles Pasqua was given a one-year suspended prison sentence for fraud over his part in the Sofremi affair.

== See also ==
- National Court (Iceland)
- Judiciary of France
