= Health Management Associates (Arkansas company) =

Health Management Associates is a defunct Arkansas-based company involved in a blood-management scandal during the 1980s.

== History ==
HMA was founded by Francis M. Henderson, a pediatrician from Pine Bluff, Arkansas.

HMA was contracted by the state of Arkansas to provide prison healthcare in the early to mid-1980s. This arrangement allowed HMA to collect blood from the prisoners at the Cummins Unit in Grady, Arkansas. HMA paid the prisoners seven dollars and sold it for fifty dollars at a profit, though some of it was proven to be infected with HIV and hepatitis C. In 1982, Henderson contracted with a Canadian company named Continental Pharma Cryosan, Limited, which turned the blood into clotting factor and sold it to the Red Cross. In 1983, Canadian officials discovered the source of the blood, and canceled the contracts.

In 1985 an investigation of HMA was called by then Arkansas Governor Bill Clinton. HMA was cleared of criminal wrongdoing. A later CEO of HMA was Leonard Dunn. Dunn was a Pine Bluff banker close friend of Bill Clinton and managed to keep HMA in business. Dunn later chaired Clinton's gubernatorial campaign. He was appointed by Clinton to the Arkansas Industrial Development Commission.

In 1985, the Arkansas Board of Corrections hired an independent California firm, which concluded that HMA had violated its contract in forty areas, and put much of the responsibility on Art Lockhart, Arkansas state prisons chief, director of the Arkansas Department of Corrections. Clinton did not ask for Lockharts resignation. Lockhart also was protected by Arkansas state Senator Knox Nelson. However HMA lost its contract and it closed in 1986.

== Legacy ==
HMA is at the heart of the Arkansas Prison Plasma Scandal. Though HMA closed the Arkansas prisoner blood business continued -until 1994. Arkansas was the last US state to prohibit selling plasma extracted from prisoners.

=== The Krever Report ===
The Health Management Associates Scandal refers to the sale of tainted blood from HMA to Canadian blood banks. In 1993, Justice Horace Krever led a Royal Commission (public inquiry) which uncovered the Arkansas prison blood scheme, as he reported in 1997. The primary purpose of the report was to work on ways of improving the Canadian blood system to avoid similar problems in the future. Also, the report made mention of similar problems with prisoner blood collection practices in Florida, Louisiana, and Mississippi, as well as concerns about blood in general from San Francisco.

== See also ==
- Contaminated haemophilia blood products
- Factor 8: The Arkansas Prison Blood Scandal
- Royal Commission of Inquiry on the Blood System in Canada
