= Dick Johnson Is Dead =

2020 documentary film by Kirsten Johnson

- Promotional poster
- Directed by: Kirsten Johnson
- Written by: Nels Bangerter; Kirsten Johnson
- Produced by: Katy Chevigny; Marilyn Ness
- Cinematography: Kirsten Johnson
- Edited by: Nels Bangerter
- Production companies: Big Mouth Productions; Chicken & Egg Pictures; Rooftop Films
- Distributed by: Netflix
- Release dates: January 25, 2020 (Sundance); October 2, 2020 (United States)
- Running time: 89 minutes
- Country: United States
- Language: English

Dick Johnson Is Dead is a 2020 American documentary film directed by Kirsten Johnson and co-written by Johnson and Nels Bangerter. The story focuses on Johnson's father Richard, who has dementia, portraying different ways—some of them violent "accidents"—in which he could ultimately die. In each scenario, the elderly Johnson plays along with his daughter's black humor and imaginative fantasies. The film premiered at the 2020 Sundance Film Festival, where it won the Special Jury Award for Innovation in Non-fiction Storytelling. It was released on Netflix on October 2, 2020.

== Synopsis ==
Richard Johnson (referred to as "Dick") is a retired clinical psychiatrist who is suffering from dementia. His daughter Kirsten Johnson involves him in a series of imaginative enactments of his impending death, some of them violent "accidents" such as "falling down a flight of stairs, [or] being struck in the neck and bleeding out". She also has him act out his own funeral and fantasizes about him entering the gates of heaven. Dick amiably plays along with her black humor; in one scene he proposes, "You can euthanize me".

== Cast ==
- Kirsten Johnson
- Charles Richard "Dick" Johnson

== Development ==
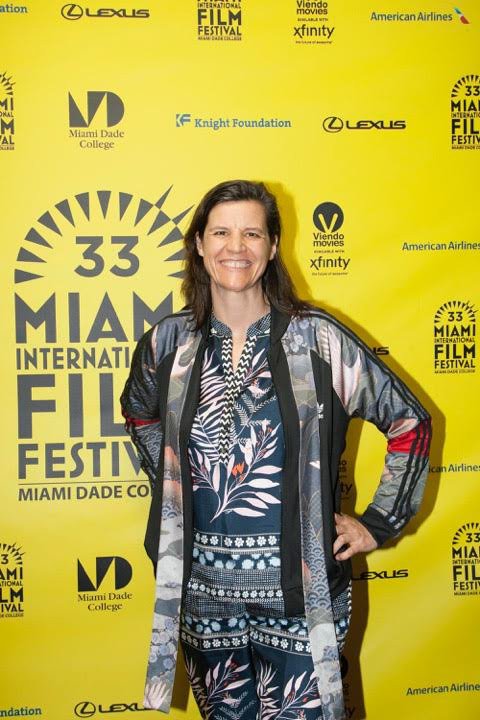
Director Kirsten Johnson at the Miami Film Festival

Kirsten Johnson was inspired to make the film after having a dream in which "there was a man in a casket and he sat up and said, 'I'm Dick Johnson and I'm not dead yet'". When she pitched the idea to her father, she asked him, "Dad, what if we make a movie where we kill you over and over again until you really die? And he laughed".

The film incorporates Johnson family photographs and home movies, including that of Richard Johnson's wife who died from Alzheimer's disease in 2007.

== Release ==
The film premiered on January 25, 2020, at the 2020 Sundance Film Festival. It was released on October 2, 2020, via Netflix. It was released in the Criterion Collection in January 2022.

=== Critical response ===
On the review aggregator website Rotten Tomatoes, the film holds an approval rating of 100%, based on 90 reviews, with an average rating of 8.7/10. The critics consensus reads "Dick Johnson Is Dead celebrates a life with bittersweet humor and grace, offering a deeply resonant perspective on mortality in the bargain." Metacritic assigned the film a weighted average score of 89 out of 100, based on 28 critics, indicating "universal acclaim".

Guy Lodge, writing for Variety, said: "At once a celebration and a lament, simultaneously jubilant and ineffably sad, it's a film worth sticking around to see". Todd McCarthy of The Hollywood Reporter called the film "one of the craftiest and funniest love letters ever composed". He continued: "Technically, this is a valentine, but it's also a serious attempt on a child's part to not only share some meaningful final moments with her father but to delay the inevitable by repeatedly imagining and even enacting it for the camera". Eric Kohn writing for IndieWire pinpointed that the title of the film "doesn't lie, but it's not exactly truthful, either". He further explained that "Dick Johnson dies many times in his daughter Kirsten's poignant and personal documentary, starting with the opening credits. And yet he's very much alive the whole time, playacting in an elaborate form of cinematic therapy with his filmmaker offspring as she wrestles with the anxiety of losing him".

Nick Allen of RogerEbert.com also remarked on Johnson's "playfulness" as she stages her father's death scenes, as well as her "transparency": "And every time she abruptly cuts to a Dick death scene (BOOM! An air conditioner just fell on his head), the movie shows us the film set, the Dick stunt doubles, and Kirsten directing all of it". He concludes: "The film is not just about having these images of Johnson, but the process of it—so much that it leaves you wondering if there's more to be said about how these experimental recreations draw different lines of sensitivity for Kirsten and Dick". Alissa Wilkinson of Vox wrote: "American culture fears death, hides it, tries to forget it's going to happen, and goes to great lengths to stave it off. But Dick Johnson Is Dead suggests that learning to confront reminders of death, to even conjure them for yourself and examine them closely, takes some of the sting out of death and replaces it with love".

David Leitner of Filmmaker magazine wrote: "For humor this dark, all one can say is, like father, like daughter". Brianna Zigler of Little White Lies wrote: "Love, laughter and death are not mutually exclusive: after all, to mourn someone is to have loved them and to have known them, which is a beautiful thing – something the film illustrates quite elegantly". Jordan Raup of The Film Stage wrote: "Dick Johnson Is Dead might be one of the most universal films ever made. Providing levity and comfort to ideas of mortality, Kirsten Johnson has illuminated the sweet embrace of death".

In June 2025, IndieWire ranked the film at number 78 on its list of "The 100 Best Movies of the 2020s (So Far)."

=== Accolades ===
Award	Date of ceremony	Category	Recipient(s)	Result	Ref.
Sundance Film Festival	February 1, 2020	U.S. Documentary Special Jury Award for Innovation in Nonfiction Storytelling	Kirsten Johnson	Won	
Critics' Choice Documentary Awards	November 16, 2020	Best Documentary Feature	Dick Johnson Is Dead	Won	
Critics' Choice Documentary Awards	November 16, 2020	Best Director	Kirsten Johnson	Won	
Critics' Choice Documentary Awards	November 16, 2020	Best Cinematography	Kirsten Johnson	Nominated	
Critics' Choice Documentary Awards	November 16, 2020	Best Narration	Kirsten Johnson	Nominated	
Critics' Choice Documentary Awards	November 16, 2020	Most Compelling Living Subjects of a Documentary	Dick Johnson	Won	
Chicago Film Critics Association Awards	December 21, 2020	Best Documentary	Dick Johnson Is Dead	Won	
Florida Film Critics Circle Awards	December 21, 2020	Best Documentary Film	Dick Johnson Is Dead	Runner-up	
International Documentary Association Awards	January 16, 2021	Best Editing	Nels Bangerter	Won	
International Documentary Association Awards	January 16, 2021	Best Writing	Nels Bangerter and Kirsten Johnson	Won	
Cinema Eye Honors Documentary Awards	March 9, 2021	Outstanding Nonfiction Feature	Kirsten Johnson, Katy Chevigny, Marilyn Ness	Nominated	
Cinema Eye Honors Documentary Awards	March 9, 2021	Outstanding Direction	Kirsten Johnson	Won	
Cinema Eye Honors Documentary Awards	March 9, 2021	Audience Choice Prize	Kirsten Johnson	Nominated	
Cinema Eye Honors Documentary Awards	March 9, 2021	The Unforgettables	Dick Johnson	Won	
Producers Guild of America Awards	March 24, 2021	Outstanding Producer of Documentary Theatrical Motion Pictures	Dick Johnson Is Dead	Nominated	
American Cinema Editors Awards	April 17, 2021	Best Edited Documentary (Feature)	Nels Bangerter	Nominated	
Independent Spirit Awards	April 22, 2021	Best Documentary Feature	Dick Johnson Is Dead	Nominated	
Detroit Film Critics Society Awards		Detroit Film Critics Society Award for Best Documentary	Dick Johnson Is Dead	Won	
Primetime Emmy Awards	September 18, 2021	Exceptional Merit in Documentary Filmmaking	Kirsten Johnson, Katy Chevigny and Marilyn Ness	Nominated	
Primetime Emmy Awards	September 18, 2021	Outstanding Directing for a Documentary/Nonfiction Program	Kirsten Johnson	Won	
Primetime Emmy Awards	September 18, 2021	Outstanding Cinematography for Nonfiction Program	Kirsten Johnson	Nominated	
