= Peter Bouckaert (activist) =

Belgian human rights activist

- Born: Pellenberg, Belgium
- Education: University of California, Santa Barbara; Stanford University Law School
- Known for: Human Rights advocacy

Peter Bouckaert is a human rights activist who served as emergency director for Human Rights Watch from 1997 until 2017. He has investigated human rights abuses in Chechnya, Sierra Leone, Iraq, Afghanistan, Libya, and the Central African Republic. He now works for Blue Ventures, a marine conservation group.

He is the subject of the 2014 documentary E-Team, a documentary about the atrocities in Syria and Libya.

He has been based in Madagascar since 2019, where he manages a farming project in Andasibe, Moramanga.

== Early life and education ==
Bouckaert was born in Pellenberg, Belgium, in 1970, and grew up on a farm. He spent part of his youth in the United States.

He graduated from the University of California, Santa Barbara, in 1993, and from Stanford University Law School in 1997.

== Career ==
Bouckaert began work for Human Rights Watch immediately after law school. He was involved in early efforts to investigate and publicize atrocities carried out by the Serbian government in the Kosovo region in the late 1990s. This work is credited with having inspired the Clinton Administration to support the NATO intervention in Kosovo.

Bouckaert helped to create the emergency program for Human Rights Watch to increase the ability of the organization to respond rapidly to major human rights crises. In addition to his work in Kosovo, he was involved in human rights investigations in Chechnya, Sierra Leone, Iraq, Afghanistan, Libya, and the Central African Republic. The film E-Team documents his investigative work in Libya during the NATO intervention in 2011.

Bouckaert serves on the board of directors for The New Humanitarian and is employed by Blue Ventures conservation organisation.

== Awards and honors ==
In 2012, he was won the Distinguished Alumni Award from the University of California, Santa Barbara. He was awarded an honorary doctorate from the University of Leuven in 2016.

== Selected publications ==
- Peter Bouckaert and Fred Abrahams, Federal Republic of Yugoslavia : a week of terror in Drenica: humanitarian law violations in Kosovo New York, 1999, Human Rights Watch
- Peter Bouckaert, Center of the storm: a case study of human rights abuses in Hebron district, 2001, Human Rights Watch
- Peter Bouckaert, The Unravelling: Journey Through the Central African Republic Crisis, 2014 Human Rights Watch
