= Katy Chevigny =

American documentary filmmaker (b.1968/1969)

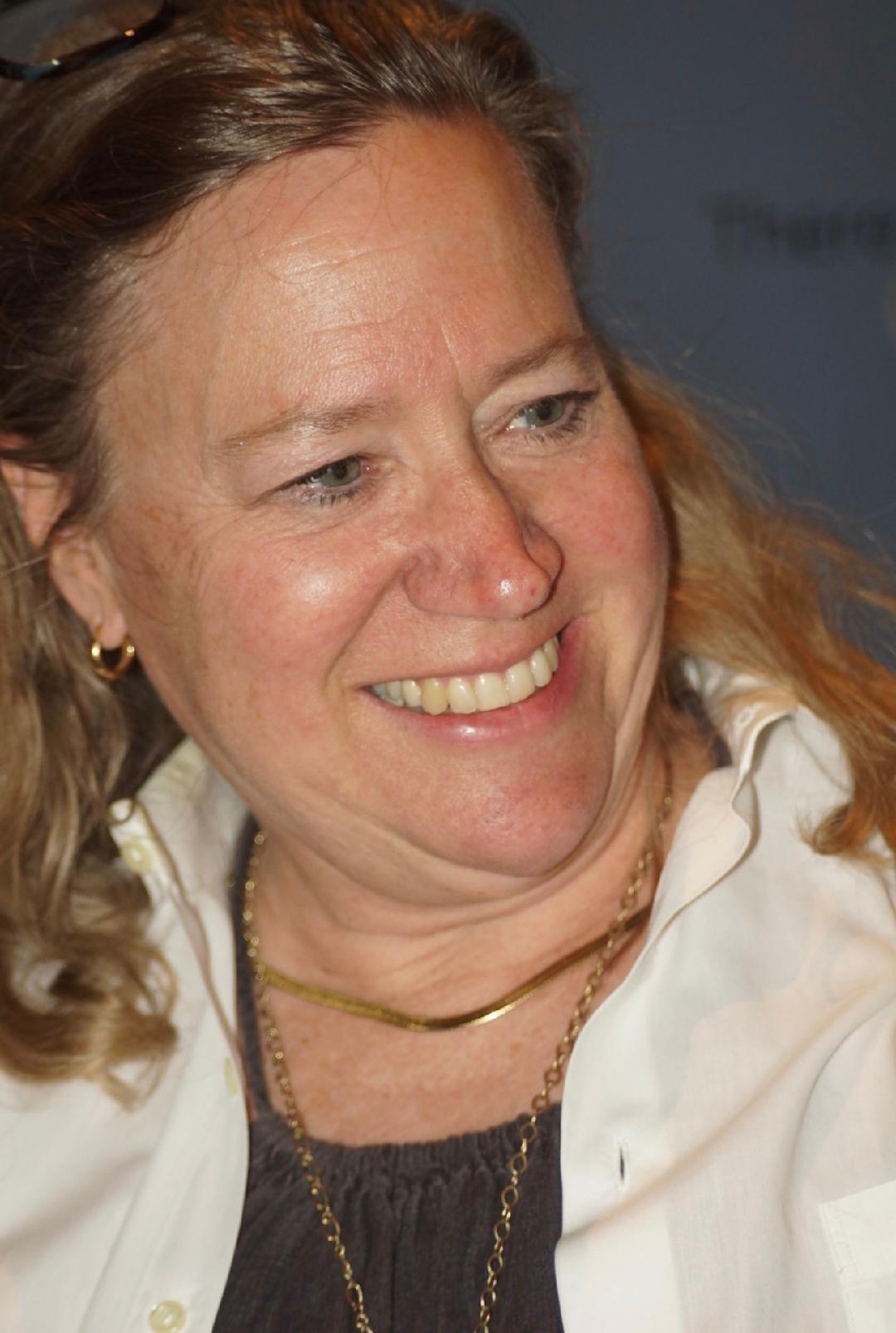
- Born: Katy Gale Chevigny; New York
- Education: Yale University (BA)
- Occupation: Documentary filmmaker
- Years active: 1997–present
- Notable work: Deadline (2004), E-Team (2014), Dark Money (2018)
- Spouses: Jonathan Michael Chen (m. 2001, divorced) Jack Smith (m. 2011)
- Children: 1
- Awards: Thurgood Marshall Journalism Award (for Deadline)

Katy Gale Chevigny is an American documentary filmmaker. She has produced or directed more than 30 documentary films and won a number of awards for her work.

== Early life and education ==
Chevigny was born to Bell Gale Chevigny and Paul G. Chevigny. Her father was a law professor emeritus at NYU Law, where he headed its human rights clinic. Her mother is a literature professor emeritus at Purchase College and edited Doing Time: 25 Years of Prison Writing (1999). Chevigny graduated cum laude from Yale University.

== Career ==
Chevigny was employed as a social worker in Chicago, and developed an interest in film. After deciding to change careers, she moved to New York City to start Big Mouth Productions in 1997 with a friend from college, Julia Pimsleur. Pimsleur left the company in 2002. As of 2004 Chevigny's partner in the company was Dallas Brennan. By 2022, Marilyn Ness had joined the company.

With Kirsten Johnson she co-directed Deadline (2004), which won a Thurgood Marshall Journalism Award. The film, an examination of Illinois governor George Ryan's decision to commute the death sentences of everyone awaiting execution in the state, was purchased and broadcast on Dateline NBC, a rare example of a major commercial network acquiring an independent documentary. (Note: A partial transcript of the film is available online.)

Chevigny directed Election Day which premiered at the South By Southwest Film Festival in 2007 and was broadcast on POV in 2008.

She co-directed with Ross Kauffman the feature-length documentary E-Team, which won Best Cinematography at the 2014 Sundance Film Festival and was released as a Netflix Original in October 2014. She produced the 2014 documentary 1971.

She directed one of six segments of Hard Earned, which aired on Al Jazeera America in 2015 and won an Alfred I. duPont Award.

With Kimberly Reed, Chevigny co-produced Dark Money (2018). PBS purchased distribution rights to the film, planning to include it in the docu-series POV.

In 2024, Chevigny directed the narrative film The Easy Kind revolving around a musician, which had its world premiere at the 51st Telluride Film Festival and released in June 2026, by Persimmon.

== Recognition ==
Chevigny received a MacDowell Fellowship in 2008.

Two films she co-produced have been nominated for an Emmy, in 2020 Becoming and in 2021 Dick Johnson Is Dead, which also won the Special Jury Award for Innovation in Nonfiction Storytelling at Sundance in 2020.

== Film work ==
- Brother Born Again (2001)
- Innocent Until Proven Guilty (2001)
- Journey to the West: Chinese Medicine Today (2001)
- Nuyorican Dream (2001)
- Outside Looking In: Transracial Adoption in America (2001)
- Deadline (2004)
- Arctic Son (2006)
- Election Day (2007)
- The Teacher (2009)
- Camp Victory, Afghanistan (2010)
- (A)sexual (2011)
- Pushing the Elephant (2011)
- The Internet Must Go (2013)
- 1971 (2014)
- E-Team (2014)
- Cameraperson (2016)
- Hard Earned, episode 2 (2016)
- Trapped (2016)
- Sasaba (2017)
- Charm City (2018)
- Dark Money (2018)
- Don't Be Nice (2018)
- Becoming (2020)
- Dick Johnson Is Dead (2021)
- The First Step (2021)
- My Two Months in Harlem (2022)
- The Easy Kind (2024)

== Television work ==
- Great Performances
- Independent Lens
- POV

== Personal life ==
Chevigny married Dr. Jonathan Michael Chen in 2001; they later divorced.

In July 2011, she married Jack Smith, a prosecutor working for the U.S. Department of Justice. They have a daughter. The couple lived in the Netherlands from 2018 until 2022, where Smith was working in The Hague, before they moved to Washington, D.C.
