= Kelly Duda =

American film director

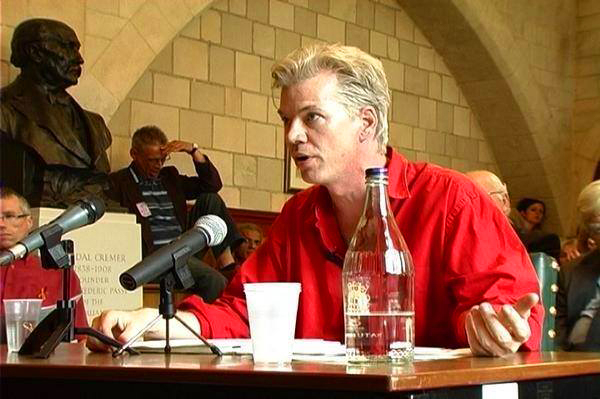
- Kelly Duda testifying in Parliament in the UK before the Lord Archer Inquiry in 2007
- Born: Little Rock, Arkansas, U.S.
- Occupation(s): filmmaker and activist

Kelly Duda is an American filmmaker, investigative journalist and activist from Arkansas best known for the 2005 documentary, Factor 8: The Arkansas Prison Blood Scandal.

== Career ==
Duda contributed to the Fuji Television documentary, The Hepatitis C Epidemic: A 15-Year Government Cover-up. The program won a Peabody Award in 2003 and was reportedly watched by more than 12 million viewers in Japan.

After 8 years of research and 5 years of filming, Duda released Factor 8: The Arkansas Prison Blood Scandal in 2005, a feature-length documentary, which alleges that in the 1970s and 1980s, the Arkansas prison system profited from selling blood plasma from inmates infected with viral hepatitis and HIV. The documentary contends that thousands of victims who received transfusions of a blood product derived from these plasma products, Factor VIII, died as a result. The premiere of the film was delayed due to a legal dispute about the film's ownership. Duda experienced negative responses in Arkansas as a result of his investigation, including death threats, his tires being slashed, break-ins, and files being stolen.

As a result of the documentary, on July 11, 2007, Duda testified at the Lord Archer Inquiry on Contaminated Blood in the Parliament of the United Kingdom overseen by Peter Archer, Baron Archer of Sandwell. The British inquiry aimed to investigate the British government's culpability in the National Health Service's use of tainted blood. Duda gave evidence as to the United States' role in the events. He also met with UK investigators and submitted written testimony in 2020 for the Infected Blood Inquiry, a full public inquiry lasting five years that recommended compensation for tainted blood victims.

On December 4, 2017, Duda testified in a criminal trial in Naples, Italy against Duilio Poggiolini, and 10 representatives of the Marcucci Group, who have been charged with manslaughter for supplying blood products (including factor 8) to Italian patients, including hemophiliacs. 2,605 Italians have been infected with HIV and hepatitis from contaminated blood products.

In 2012, Kelly accompanied actor and activist George Takei to the Rohwer War Relocation Center site and cemetery, marking the 70th anniversary of Executive Order 9066. He was also a photographer on the 2014 documentary To Be Takei.

== Activism ==
On September 20, 2007, Kelly Duda traveled to Jena, Louisiana with students from the University of Central Arkansas to participate in the Jena 6 march for justice, along with Martin Luther King III.

Duda was co-founder, along with Lanette Grate, and president of the short-lived West Memphis Three Injustice Project. Originally named the West Memphis Three Innocence Project, the 501(c)(3) organization, was renamed after a cease and desist order for unauthorized and illegal use of the Innocence Project's name. The mission of the West Memphis Three Injustice Project was to help exonerate Arkansas prisoners Jason Baldwin, Jessie Misskelley and Damien Echols, otherwise known as the West Memphis Three.

In 2015, Duda wrote an editorial and spoke at a committee hearing on ending Robert E. Lee Day as a state holiday in Arkansas, which at the time was celebrated on Martin Luther King Jr. Day. After two separate bills were drafted to end the holiday, the proposed law failed four times to make it out of the Republican controlled committee. In December 2016, Duda supported a resolution from the City of Little Rock urging lawmakers to eliminate Lee Day as a holiday in favor of MLK Day. Duda wrote an opinion piece on the matter in 2017, and later that year SB519 eliminated Lee Day as a state holiday, instead establishing a memorial day for Lee in October by gubernatorial proclamation and allowing MLK Day, the federal holiday to stand on its own.

In 2021, Duda launched a public campaign to free Rolf Kaestel, an inmate whistleblower who appeared in Duda's "Factor 8". Kaestel was serving a life sentence for robbing a taco hut of $264 (equivalent to $913 in 2024) with a water pistol in Fort Smith, Arkansas, in 1981. After serving 40 years, Kaestel was freed when Governor Asa Hutchinson commuted his sentence.
