= Neighbours (sculpture) =

Public artwork in Toronto, Ontario, Canada

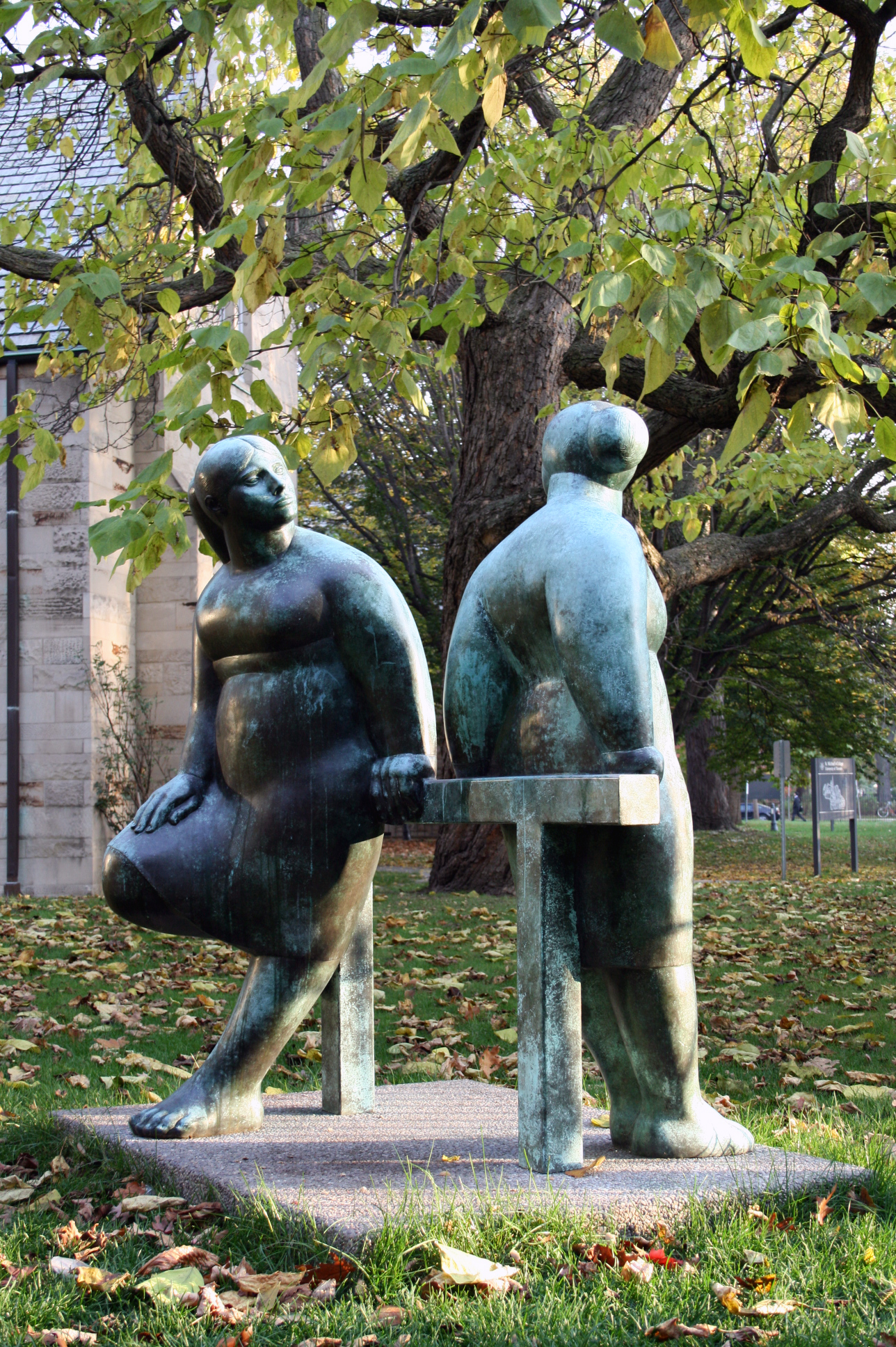
- The sculpture in 2007
- Dimensions: 169 cm × 122 cm × 153 cm (67 in × 48 in × 60 in)
- Location: Toronto, Ontario, Canada
- 43°39′57.1″N 79°23′28.9″W

Neighbours is a sculpture by Canadian artist Joe Rosenthal. Made of bronze, it depicts two figures leaning on a railing and gazing at each other. It was installed within the St. Michael’s College campus of the University of Toronto in 2001

== Reception ==
Jonathan Pinto of CBC News called the sculpture "iconic", and NowToronto.com has called the work "Rubenesque" and "weirdly hypnotizing".
