= Marilyn Ness =

Film producer and director

Marilyn Ness is a documentary film producer and director based in New York City who made the social justice documentaries Bad Blood: A Cautionary Tale (2010), Cameraperson (2016), and Charm City (2018). More recent projects include the Netflix Original documentary Becoming with Michelle Obama, which was nominated for four Primetime Emmy awards and Netflix Original documentary Dick Johnson is Dead, which was on the Academy Award Shortlist for Best Documentary in 2021. She is as of 2021 an adjunct assistant professor at Columbia University.

== Career ==
Marilyn Ness has worked for over twenty years in the film industry as a producer and a director. She has been nominated for six Emmy Awards, has won a Peabody Award, and several of her projects have been shortlisted for an Academy Award. Marilyn Ness is a co-founder of Big Mouth Productions, which she established with producing partner, Katy Chevigny, in 1997. Based in New York City and Nashville, USA, Big Mouth Productions is an independent film production company with a growing collection of feature-length documentaries to its name.

=== Dick Johnson is Dead ===
Dick Johnson is Dead is a 2020 Netflix Original documentary directed by Kirsten Johnson and produced by Marilyn Ness. It is a story about coming to terms with the loss of a parent first to Alzheimer's disease and then again in death. The film chronicles the journey of father and daughter saying goodbye to each other and Dick Johnson moving into his final season of life. Dick Johnson is Dead has received multiple awards including the Special Jury Prize for Innovation in Non-Fiction Filmmaking at the Sundance Film Festival in 2020, the Critics’ Choice Award for Best Documentary Feature and Best Director 2020, as well as Best Editing and Best Writing IDA Documentary Awards 2020.

=== Becoming ===
Becoming provides an inside look at the life of former First Lady Michelle Obama. As the former First Lady embarks on a 34-city tour to promote her book of the same title, the film takes viewers to events that highlight the power of community, show discussions between the former First Lady and her public about how to bridge our divides as a nation, and reveals the spirit of connection that Michelle Obama has become famous for fostering with everyone she meets. It was nominated for a number of honors including a 2020 Primetime Emmy award.

=== Charm City ===
At a moment fraught with increased violence, pervasive fear and a deepening divide, Charm City follows a community in Baltimore, USA over the span of three years in the cinema verite style. The film focuses on the impact of violence in Baltimore, as well as death of Freddie Gray. Centered around the police and the community in Baltimore, the film focuses on quality of life and community support in the midst of violence.

In April 2019, Charm City was released first in the Tribeca Film Festival, and later on PBS as part of Independent Lens. The film was on the shortlist for the Academy Award for Best Documentary Feature.

=== Bad Blood ===
Bad Blood: A Cautionary Tale was directed and produced by Marilyn Ness and released in 2011 on PBS. The social justice documentary film campaigns for change in the US blood donation policies. The film is set in the 1980s, and focuses on hemophiliacs diagnosed with HIV after receiving treatment.

=== Cameraperson ===
Produced by Marilyn ness, Cameraperson documents the career and life of the director, Kirsten Johnson. The film premiered in 2016 at the Sundance Film Festival. After its release, the film made the shortlist for the Academy Awards in 2017.

=== Trapped ===
Marilyn Ness produced the film Trapped (2016 American film) which premiered in the Sundance Film Festival in 2016. The social justice documentary film centres around doctors performing abortions in the USA in states with anti-abortion laws. The film was awarded the Jury Prize for Social Impact Filmmaking. The film also received a Peabody Award.

=== E-Team ===
Produced by Marilyn Ness in 2014, E-Team was released in the Sundance Film Festival. It was later purchased by Netflix originals, and the film received two Emmy Award nominations.

== Filmography ==
Year	Work	Credited as	Awards & Nominations
2020	Dick Johnson is Dead	Producer	Special Jury Prize for Innovation in Non-Fiction Filmmaking at the Sundance Film Festival 2020 Best Editing and Best Writing IDA Documentary Award 2020 Producer’s Guild Award Nominee for Outstanding Producer of Documentary Motion Picture 2020 Chicago Indie Critics (CIC) Award Nominee
2020	Becoming	Producer	Primetime Emmy Awards Nominee
2019	Untitled Jamie Boyle Project	Producer	
2015-2019	Independent Lens	Producer - 3 episodes	
2018	Charm City	Producer	
2016	Cameraperson	Producer	International Documentary Association (IDA) Award Nominee
2016	Trapped (2016 American film)	Producer	
2015	The Above	Producer	International Documentary Association (IDA) Award Nominee
2014	1971	Producer	
2014	E-Team	Producer	
2011	Bad Blood: A Cautionary Tale	Producer/Director	
