= E-Team =

2014 film

- Sundance release poster
- Directed by: Katy Chevigny; Ross Kauffman
- Produced by: Katy Chevigny; Ross Kauffman; Marilyn Ness
- Cinematography: Rachel Beth Anderson; Ross Kauffman
- Edited by: David Teague
- Music by: T. Griffin
- Production companies: Big Mouth Productions; Red Light Films
- Distributed by: Netflix
- Release date: January 18, 2014 (Sundance)
- Running time: 90 minutes
- Country: United States
- Language: English

E-Team is a 2014 American documentary film co-directed and produced by Katy Chevigny and Ross Kauffman. The film premiered in the competition category of U.S. Documentary Competition program at the 2014 Sundance Film Festival on January 18, 2014. Rachel Beth Anderson and Ross Kauffman won the Cinematography Award: U.S. Documentary at the festival, as well as the Candescent Award.

== Synopsis ==
The film narrates the story of four members of the Human Rights Watch Emergencies Team, investigating and reporting the human rights abuse across the globe.

== Reception ==
Rob Nelson in his review for Variety said that "The valiant and vital work of four globetrotting human rights activists is expertly illuminated in 'E-Team', a dynamic and immersive piece of you-are-there verite." Duane Byrge of The Hollywood Reporter gave the film a positive review and said that "In this spellbinding story, filmmakers Katy Chevigny and Ross Kauffman thrust us into the red-alert lives of four E-Team members. It's a comprehensive portrayal of these people's personal and professional lives. We see what makes them tick. Are they adrenaline junkies? Thrill-seekers? Not at all." Carlos Aguilar from Indiewire in his review said that "Powerful and shocking but with enough humanity from its subjects to add tender moments of hope, the "E-Team" is a fascinating look at how information can be the most effective tool to avoid indifference."
