= Bad Blood: A Cautionary Tale =

- Directed by: Marilyn Ness
- Written by: Marilyn Ness; Sheila Curran Bernard
- Produced by: Marilyn Ness
- Cinematography: David Ford
- Edited by: Marion Sears Hunter
- Music by: Joel Goodman; David Bramfitt
- Release date: June 28, 2010
- Running time: 83 minutes
- Country: United States
- Language: English
- Budget: $300,000

Bad Blood: A Cautionary Tale is a documentary film about contaminated hemophilia blood products. The film was co-written by Marilyn Ness and Sheila Curran Bernard, produced and directed by Marilyn Ness, with cinematography by David Ford, editing by Marion Sears Hunter, and original music score by Joel Goodman and David Bramfitt. The film premiered on July 28, 2010 in New York City.
