= Contaminated haemophilia blood products =

Health crisis in the late 1970s up to 1985

Contaminated haemophilia blood products were a serious public health problem in the late 1970s up to 1985.

Hemophilia A causes a deficiency in Factor VIII, a protein required for blood clotting. Factor VIII injections are a common treatment to prevent or stop bleeding in people with hemophilia A.

Contamination of these and other products caused large numbers of hemophiliacs to become infected with HIV and hepatitis C. The companies involved included Alpha Therapeutic Corporation, Institut Mérieux (which then became Rhone-Poulenc Rorer Inc., and is now part of Sanofi), Bayer Corporation and its Cutter Biological division, and Baxter International and its Hyland Pharmaceutical division. Estimates for HIV infections in the United States alone range from 6,000 to 10,000, with another 4,000 in France, 2,000 in Canada and 1,200 in the United Kingdom, and many more worldwide.

== Initial concerns ==
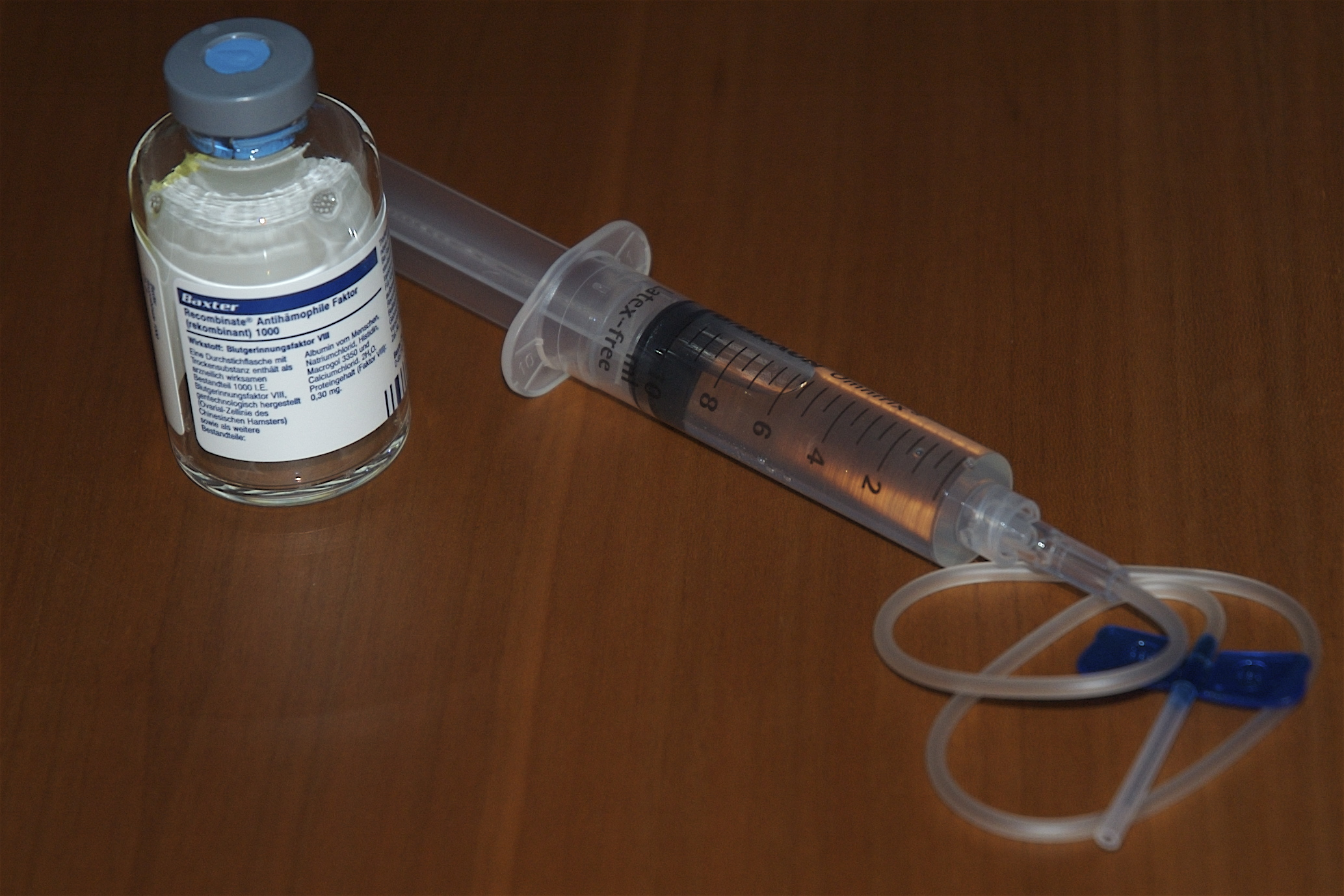
Concentrated form of Factor VIII

In 1981 concern was growing over an unidentified infectious disease associated with immune system collapse that would later become known as AIDS. In the U.S. it was found mostly in homosexual men and intravenous drug users, while in France a more diverse group of patients was affected. On July 16, 1982, the United States Centers for Disease Control and Prevention (CDC) reported that three hemophiliacs had acquired the disease. Epidemiologists started to believe that the disease was being spread through blood products, with grave implications for hemophiliacs who had routinely been treated with concentrate made from large pools of donated plasma, much of which was collected by commercial paid-donor plasmapheresis prior to routine HIV testing, often in U.S. cities that had large numbers of homosexuals and intravenous drug users and in some U.S. prisons and underdeveloped countries during the four or five years of the late 1970s through early 1980s before AIDS was discovered and recognized as a public health concern.

In January 1983, the manager of plasma procurement for Bayer's Cutter Biological division acknowledged in a letter that "There is strong evidence to suggest that AIDS is passed on to other people through ... plasma products." In March 1983, the CDC warned that blood products "appear responsible for AIDS among hemophilia patients." By May 1983, a Cutter rival began making a heat-treated concentrate and France decided to halt all imports of clotting factor concentrates.

Cutter feared losing customers, so according to an internal memo, Cutter "want[ed] to give the impression that [they were] continuously improving our product without telling them [they expected] soon to also have a heat-treated" concentrate. The process rendered the virus "undetectable" in the product, according to a government study.

By June 1983, a Cutter letter to distributors in France and 20 other countries said that "AIDS has become the center of irrational response in many countries" and that "This is of particular concern to us because of unsubstantiated speculations that this syndrome may be transmitted by certain blood products."

== Continued sales ==
On February 29, 1984, Cutter became the last of the four major blood product companies to get US approval to sell heated concentrate. Even after Cutter began selling the new product, for several months, until August 1984, the company continued making the old medicine. One reason was that the company had several fixed-price contracts and believed that the old product would be cheaper to produce.

Bayer officials (responding on behalf of Cutter) issued a statement, stating that Cutter continued to sell the old medicine, "because some customers doubted the new drug's effectiveness", and because some countries were slow to approve its sale. The company also said that a shortage of plasma, used to make the medicine, had kept Cutter from manufacturing more of the new product." Bayer officials also claimed that an overall plasma shortage in 1985 kept Cutter from making more heat treated medicine; however, because Cutter was using some of its limited plasma to continue making the old product, they may have contributed to the shortage. While Bayer said that "procedural requirements" imposed by Taiwan slowed down their ability to sell the new product, according to The New York Times, Hsu Chien-wen, an official at Taiwan's health department, said in 2003 that Cutter had not applied for permission to sell the heated medicine until July 1985, a year and a half after doing so in the United States. Cindy Lai, assistant director of Hong Kong's health department, said that Cutter needed only to get an import license in the 1980s to sell the newer product, and that the process would normally take one week.

While the new product was selling well, a Cutter company meeting noted that "There is excess nonheated inventory", which resulted in the company deciding to "review international markets again to determine if more of this product can be sold." Cutter decided to sell millions of dollars' worth of the older medicine to Asia and Latin America while selling the new, safer product in the West, where the nonheated product was proving increasingly unmarketable.

In late 1984, when a Hong Kong distributor asked Cutter about the newer product, records show that Cutter asked the distributor to "use up stocks" of the old medicine before switching to its "safer, better" product. Several months later, once hemophiliacs in Hong Kong began testing positive for HIV, some local doctors began to question whether Cutter was dumping "AIDS tainted" medicine into less-developed countries. Cutter denied the allegation, claiming that the unheated product posed "no severe hazard" and was in fact the "same fine product we have supplied for years." By May 1985, when the Hong Kong distributor told of an impending medical emergency, asking for the newer product, Cutter replied that most of the new medicine was going to the US and Europe and there wasn't enough for Hong Kong, except for a small amount for the "most vocal patients."

The United States Food and Drug Administration (FDA) helped to keep the news out of the public eye. In May 1985, the FDA's regulator of blood products, Harry M. Meyer Jr., believing the companies had broken a voluntary agreement to withdraw the old medicine from the market, called together officials of the companies and ordered them to comply. Cutter's notes from the meeting indicate that Meyer asked that the issue be "quietly solved without alerting the Congress, the medical community and the public" while another company noted that the FDA wanted the matter solved "quickly and quietly."

At the same time, a Cutter official wrote that "It appears there are no longer any markets in the Far East where we can expect to sell substantial quantities of nonheat-treated [medicine]" and stopped shipping unheated concentrate in July 1985.

According to The New York Times, doctors and patients contacted overseas said they had not known of the contents of the Cutter documents. The number of affected patients is unknown. Since many records are unavailable and because an HIV test was not available at the time, one cannot know whether foreign hemophiliacs were infected with HIV before Cutter began selling its safer medicine or afterward.

The New York Times found these largely unnoticed documents ("internal memorandums, minutes of company marketing meetings and telexes to foreign distributors") as part of the production in connection with the American hemophiliacs lawsuits described below. Sidney M. Wolfe, director of the Public Citizen Health Research Group, which has been investigating the industry's practices for three decades, called them "the most incriminating internal pharmaceutical industry documents I have ever seen."

On August 22, 2003, MSNBC's Scarborough Country had Bayer on their "Rat of the Week" segment. Speaking with Mike Papantonio, a legal advisor to the show, they discussed the 2003 The New York Times article referenced above, saying that the product (known by Bayer to bear the risk of contamination) was "dropped ... in Japan, Spain and France."

As of 2003, the United States Justice Department had yet to investigate any corporate executives.

== Specifics by country ==
The sale of contaminated blood products led to court cases in many countries.

=== Canada ===
In Canada, by the time blood tests began in late 1985, about 2,000 people had been infected with HIV and up to 60,000 with Hepatitis C. Three suits were brought against the Canadian Red Cross by people who had received tainted blood products. In April 2001, the Supreme Court of Canada found the Canadian Red Cross guilty of negligence for failing to screen blood donors effectively for HIV infection. The Canadian Red Cross pleaded guilty to criminal charges related to distributing tainted blood products and infecting Canadians with HIV and hepatitis C. As of 2003, the Royal Canadian Mounted Police blood task force had an ongoing investigation into the Arkansas blood sells.

In July, 2006 the federal government approved a $1 billion compensation package for the so-called "forgotten victims" of tainted blood.

=== France ===
In France, an estimated 4,000 people, many of whom were hemophiliacs, were given blood infected with HIV. France continued using older style, untreated concentrate through August 1983. A former Health Minister was convicted for failing to adequately screen the blood, leading to the deaths of five people from AIDS, and the infection of two others during a key period in 1985. Two other government officials that continued to use the old unheated stock in 1985, when a heated product was available, received prison sentences. Allegedly, all three politicians delayed the introduction of United States blood-screening tests in France until a rival French product was ready to be sold on the market.

=== Iran ===
In Iran, as of 2001, the former head of Iran's blood transfusion centre, Dr. Farhadi, went on trial along with two other doctors, facing charges including negligence for importing HIV-tainted supplies from France after patients contracted HIV. The case followed complaints by families of around 170 people, many of them children, who had hemophilia or thalassaemia.

Approximately 300 Iranians were infected by the tainted blood products, according to Iran's Ministry of Health. Iran is the only country that has not received compensation from France, according to Fars News. When the French Prime Minister Laurent Fabius visited Iran after the Iran nuclear deal there was renewed controversy and protests, partly due to the infected blood scandal.

=== Iraq ===
In 1986, officials from Saddam Hussein's Health Ministry had determined that at least 115 Iraqi hemophiliacs had contracted AIDS from clotting agents imported from France and Austria. According to Said I. Hakki, the director of the Iraqi Red Crescent Society, 189 hemophiliacs, from 6 months to 18 years old, contracted HIV from blood products that Institut Mérieux and Immuno sold to Iraq from 1982 to 1986; undetected, the virus later spread to at least a further 50 Iraqis, through sexual intercourse, childbirth or breast-feeding.

In August 2005, the 35 or so survivors, along with the families of the ones who died, and the Iraqi Red Crescent Society sued the Health Ministry and Institut Mérieux of France and Immuno AG of Austria, two corporations who either acquired or succeeded the companies that sold tainted blood products to Iraq. Institut Mérieux is now part of Sanofi-Aventis, while Immuno AG was acquired by Baxter International in 1996.

Several of the infected hemophiliacs spoke with The New York Times in 2006 about life under Hussein's rule. They were forced to "sign a pledge vowing not to work, marry, attend school, use public swimming pools or barbershops, visit a doctor's office or tell anyone about their condition", punishable by death. The families' homes had warnings painted on them, telling neighbours to stay away because the house was contaminated with HIV and even uninfected siblings were not allowed to marry. As of 2006, the infected hemophiliacs receive about $35 a month in government assistance, but no HIV medication.

=== Ireland ===
The Lindsay Tribunal was set up in Ireland in 1999 to investigate the infection of hemophiliacs with HIV and Hepatitis C from contaminated blood products supplied by the Blood Transfusion Service Board.

According to the tribunal a 'minimal figure' of 250 hemophiliacs were infected with HIV or Hepatitis C while receiving treatment from the BTSB before 1985.

=== Italy ===
Angelo Magrini, the head of a hemophiliacs' association, said that as of 2001, 1,300 people, including almost 150 children, had died in Italy from infected blood infusions since 1985.

In June 2001, an Italian court in Rome ordered the Health Ministry to pay damages to 351 people who had contracted HIV and Hepatitis C through blood transfusions; the court said that the ministry was too slow to introduce measures to prevent the virus being spread by donated blood, and did not establish proper checks on plasma and plasma-derived products. Although almost 100 of the victims had already died, the court ruled that their families were still entitled to compensation.

=== Japan ===
In Japan, the Health Ministry did not ban unheated products until December 1985, despite knowing that they were contaminated. As a result, over 1,400 Japanese hemophiliacs were exposed to HIV, and more than 500 were believed to have died by 2001.

In November 1995, a case involving Japanese hemophiliacs was settled, with compensation of $420,000 for each victim, $235,000 coming from the companies involved and the rest from the Japanese government. This was much higher than the results being discussed in the United States cases.

In February 2000, three former drug company executives accused of selling blood products tainted with HIV were given prison terms.

However, in March 2001, a Tokyo court cleared the former top AIDS expert of professional negligence over the scandal.

=== Portugal ===
In Portugal, more than 100 Portuguese hemophiliacs were infected with HIV after receiving transfusions of contaminated plasma that had been imported and distributed by the public health service. In 2001, Leonor Beleza, a former health minister, was indicted for propagating a contagious disease during her time in office during the 1980s.

=== United Kingdom ===
In the 1970s and 1980s, a large number of people in the United Kingdom – most of whom had haemophilia – were infected with hepatitis C and HIV as a result of receiving contaminated clotting factor products. In the United Kingdom, these were supplied by the National Health Service, with many of the products being imported from the US.

The Infected Blood Inquiry statistics report, published in September 2022, set out to establish the true numbers of those infected. The report found that around 1,250 people with bleeding disorders were infected with HIV in the UK and that at least a further 2,400 people were infected with Hepatitis C. The report concluded that around three-quarters of those infected with HIV, and at least 700 people infected with Hepatitis C, had died. The report also found that 8,120 people were chronically infected with Hepatitis C ten years or more after contaminated blood transfusions. Circumstances under which people were infected via transfusions were different to factor products. For example, blood for blood transfusion was not imported from the US.

=== United States ===
In 1993, top executives of three companies (Baxter International, Rhône-Poulenc and Alpha Therapeutic) met with leaders of the hemophilia community to outline the terms of a $125 million offer. Rejecting the offer, David Shrager, a plaintiffs' lawyer, filed a class action lawsuit with Jonathan Wadleigh as lead plaintiff on behalf of American hemophiliacs. Shrager had previously negotiated a favourable settlement on behalf of Canadian hemophiliacs and then established a panel of claimants, led by Wadleigh, to advise him and other lawyers. In early 1995, the United States Court of Appeals for the Seventh Circuit in Chicago decertified the lawsuit, saying it might bankrupt the industry.

While Wadleigh and Corey Dubin (another named plaintiff) favoured appealing the Seventh Circuit decision to the Supreme Court of the United States, to protect the rights of all affected hemophiliacs, not just those who had already sued, Shrager wanted to pursue the separate federal proceeding that had consolidated hundreds of individual lawsuits that had been filed against the producers. By June 1996, the differing groups reconciled, seeking industry settlement proposals.

Meanwhile, the clotting producers were quietly settling many claims. Individual lawsuits continued to fail because most states had laws shielding blood products from traditional product liability claims. However, discovery was producing damaging documents contending that the companies had collected blood from high-risk donors like homosexuals and prisoners, intensifying informal settlement negotiations. James and Matthews, using the address data of the clinics where plasma was sourced, and a spatial/demographic model of illicit drug markets, showed that during the period from 1980 to 1995, these clinics were over-represented in so-called "underclass" or extreme-poverty areas and active illicit drug markets.

In 1997, Bayer and the other three manufacturers agreed to pay $660 million to settle cases on behalf of more than 6,000 hemophiliacs infected in United States in the early 1980s, paying an estimated $100,000 net to each infected hemophiliac. The settlement consent decree denied attorney contingent fees and provided a $40 million fund to pay attorneys as ordered by the court.

Soon after the settlement, because the New York state statute of limitations required people to file a lawsuit within three years of discovering an illness, New York Governor George Pataki signed a bill allowing people infected by blood products, or their survivors, two years to bring product liability suits against the manufacturers. While the settled class members are barred from filing suits against the companies, the bill allowed an estimated additional 75 eligible persons to file suits.

The plaintiffs alleged that the companies manufactured and sold blood factor products as beneficial "medicines" that were, in fact, contaminated with HIV and/or HCV and resulted in the mass infection and/or deaths of thousands of hemophiliacs worldwide. The companies' failure to follow US federal law and conduct tests against viral hepatitis increased the risk of plasma containing HIV entering plasma pools.

== See also ==
- Ryan White, an American youth who was infected with HIV from using tainted blood from the plasma product factor VIII
- Bad Blood: A Cautionary Tale, a documentary about the crisis in the United States and other countries.
- Factor 8: The Arkansas Prison Blood Scandal, a documentary about the crisis in the United States using contaminated blood from prisoners.
- Plasma Economy, A plasmapheresis campaign in China where they exchanged blood plasma for money and resulted in contamination.
- Tainted blood scandal (United Kingdom)
- M.C. and Others v Italy (Right to property case involving bad blood victims)
- R (March) v Secretary of State for Health, 2010 judicial review by a claimant treated with contaminated blood products.
