= World Federation of Hemophilia =

International non-profit organization

- Founded: 1963; 63 years ago
- Founder: Frank Schnabel
- Location: Montreal, Quebec, Canada
- Region served: Worldwide
- Method: Therapy, Aid, and Education
- Members: 152 National Member Organizations
- Key people: President Cesar Garrido
- Website: wfh.org

The World Federation of Hemophilia (WFH) is an international non-profit organization dedicated to improving the lives of people with hemophilia (also spelled haemophilia) and other inherited bleeding disorders. It educates people with bleeding disorders and lobbies for improved medical treatment. 75% of people in the world with bleeding disorders do not know it and do not receive care.

The WFH was established by Frank Schnabel in 1963 and has its headquarters in Montreal, Canada. It has member organizations in 152 countries and official recognition from the World Health Organization. The current President is Cesar Garrido.

== World Hemophilia Day ==
World Hemophilia Day is held annually on April 17 by the WFH. It is an awareness day for hemophilia and other bleeding disorders, which also serves to raise funds and attract volunteers for the WFH. It was started in 1989; April 17 was chosen in honor of Frank Schnabel's birthday.

=== Themes by year ===
- 2025: “Access for all: Women and girls bleed too”
- 2024: “Equitable access for all: recognizing all bleeding disorders”
- 2023: "Access for All: Prevention of bleeds as the global standard of care"
- 2022: "Access for All: Partnership. Policy. Progress. Engaging your government, integrating inherited bleeding disorders into national policy"
- 2021: "Adapting to Change, Sustaining care in a new world"
- 2020: "Get+Involved"
- 2019: "Reaching Out: The First Step to Care"
- 2018: "Sharing Knowledge Makes Us Stronger"
- 2017: "Hear their voices"
- 2016: "Treatment for All, The Vision of All"
- 2015: "Building a Family of Hemophilia"
- 2014: "Global Hemophilia Care: A Shared Responsibility"
- 2013: "50 Years of Advancing Treatment for All"
- 2012: "Close the Gap"
- 2011: "Be inspired, Get involved"
- 2010: "The Many Faces of Bleeding Disorders – United to Achieve Treatment for All"
- 2009: "Together, We Care"
- 2008: "Count Me In"
- 2007: "Improve Your Life!"
