= Jonathan Sumption, Lord Sumption =

English lawyer and judge

The Right Honourable Lord Sumption OBE PC FSA FRHistS FRSL
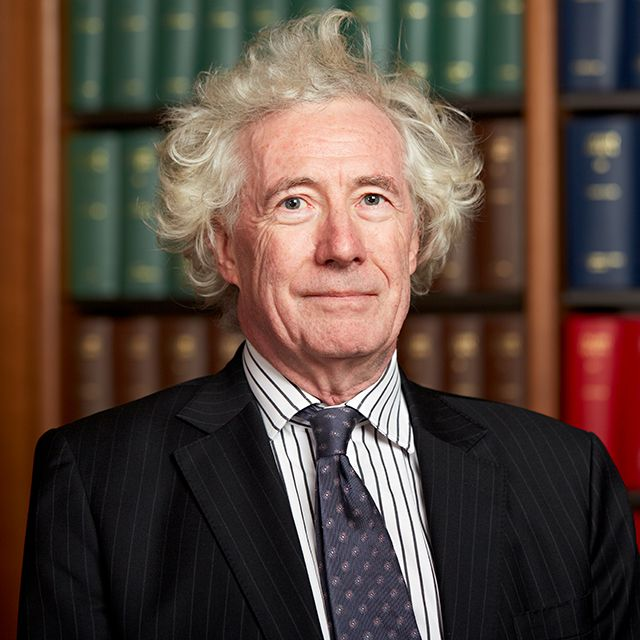

Justice of the Supreme Court of the United Kingdom
- In office 11 January 2012 – 9 December 2018
- Nominated by: Kenneth Clarke
- Appointed by: Elizabeth II
- Preceded by: The Lord Collins of Mapesbury
- Succeeded by: Lord Sales

Non-Permanent Judge of the Court of Final Appeal of Hong Kong
- In office 18 December 2019 – 4 June 2024
- Appointed by: Carrie Lam

Personal details
- Born: 9 December 1948 (age 77)
- Spouse(s): Teresa Sumption, née Whelan
- Children: 2 daughters; 1 son
- Parent(s): Anthony Sumption; Hilda Hedigan
- Education: Eton College, Magdalen College, Oxford
- Occupation: Barrister; judge
- Profession: Law

Chinese name
- Chinese: 岑耀信
Transcriptions
Yue: Cantonese
- Yale Romanization: Sàhm Yiuh Seun
- Jyutping: Sam^{4} Jiu^{6} Seon^{3}

OBE ribbon

Jonathan Philip Chadwick Sumption, Lord Sumption, OBE, PC, FSA, FRHistS, FRSL (born 9 December 1948), is a British author, medieval historian, barrister and former senior judge who sat on the Supreme Court of the United Kingdom between 2012 and 2018 and on the Hong Kong Court of Final Appeal between 2019 and 2024.

Sumption was sworn in as a Justice of the Supreme Court on 11 January 2012, succeeding Lawrence Collins, Baron Collins of Mapesbury. Exceptionally, he was appointed to the Supreme Court directly from the practising bar, without having been a full-time judge. He retired from the Supreme Court on 9 December 2018 upon reaching the mandatory retirement age of 70.

Sumption is well known for his role as a barrister in many legal cases. They include appearances in the Hutton Inquiry on HM Government's behalf, in the Three Rivers case, his representation of former Cabinet Minister Stephen Byers and the Department for Transport in the Railtrack private shareholders' action against the British Government in 2005, for defending HM Government in an appeal hearing brought by Binyam Mohamed, and for successfully defending Russian billionaire Roman Abramovich in a private lawsuit brought by Boris Berezovsky.

A former academic, Sumption wrote a substantial narrative history of the Hundred Years' War in five volumes. He was appointed an Officer of the Order of the British Empire (OBE) in the 2003 New Year Honours and was elected a Fellow of the Royal Historical Society (FRHistS) and a Fellow of the Society of Antiquaries of London (FSA). In 2019, he was appointed a Fellow of the Society of Writers to His Majesty's Signet (FWS). He was elected a Fellow of the Royal Society of Literature (FRSL) in 2025.

== Early life and education ==
Jonathan Sumption was born on 9 December 1948. He is the eldest of the four children of Anthony Sumption, a decorated naval officer and barrister, and Hilda Hedigan; their marriage was dissolved in 1979. He was educated at Eton College, where at 15 he was at the bottom of his class. He studied Medieval History at Magdalen College, Oxford, from 1967 to 1970, graduating with a first. He was elected a fellow of Magdalen College, teaching and writing books on medieval history from 1971 to 1975 before leaving to pursue a career in law. Called to the bar at the Inner Temple in 1975, he then pursued a successful legal practice in commercial law.

In the 1970s, Sumption served as an adviser to the Conservative MP and Cabinet Minister Sir Keith Joseph. In 1974, Joseph together with Margaret Thatcher, founded the Centre for Policy Studies to act as a think tank for the Conservative Party. Sumption became one of its earliest employees, working as a speechwriter for Joseph. Sumption and Joseph co-wrote a 1979 book, Equality, seeking to show that "no convincing arguments for an equal society have ever been advanced" and that "no such society has ever been successfully created".

In the late 1970s, Sumption was a regular contributor to The Sunday Telegraph.

== Legal career ==
Sumption joined Brick Court Chambers in 1975, where he remained for the entirety of his commercial legal career as a barrister. He was appointed Queen's Counsel (QC) in 1986 at the relatively young age of 38, and elected a bencher of the Inner Temple in 1991. He has served as a Deputy High Court Judge in the Chancery Division, and a Judge of the Court of Appeal of Jersey and the Guernsey Court of Appeal. In 2005, Sumption became joint head of Brick Court Chambers. He was a member of the Judicial Appointments Commission until his appointment to the Supreme Court.

On 30 November 2007, when a practising barrister, Sumption successfully represented himself before Mr Justice Collins in a judicial review application in the Administrative Court concerning proposed development near his home at Greenwich.

=== Earnings as a barrister ===
The Guardian once described him as being a member of the "million-a-year club", the elite group of barristers earning over a million pounds a year. In a letter to The Guardian in 2001, he compared his "puny £1.6 million a year" to the vastly larger amounts that comparable individuals in business, sports and entertainment are paid.

For a four-week trial (and all the preparatory work) in the UK in 2005 he charged £800,000 to represent HM Government in the largest class action in the UK, brought by 49,500 private shareholders of the collapsed national railway infrastructure company Railtrack.

Sumption earned £7.8 million for his defence of Roman Abramovich in the 2012 case Berezovsky v Abramovich. This is believed to be the highest fee ever earned in British legal history.

== Judicial career ==
On 4 May 2011, Sumption's appointment as a Justice of the Supreme Court was announced. Upon his subsequent swearing-in on 11 January 2012, he assumed the judicial courtesy title of Lord Sumption pursuant to a royal warrant (by which all members of the Supreme Court, even if they do not hold a peerage title, are accorded the style of "lord" for life).

Sumption was sworn of the Privy Council on 14 December 2011 in advance of his joining the Court, whose Justices also serve as members of the Judicial Committee of the Privy Council. He retired from the Supreme Court on 9 December 2018.

Sumption is the first lawyer appointed to the Supreme Court without previously serving as a full-time judge since its inception in 2009. There were only five such appointments as Law Lords to the Court's predecessor, the Appellate Committee of the House of Lords. Two were Scots lawyers: Lord Macmillan in 1930 and Lord Reid in 1948; the others were Lord Macnaghten (1887), Lord Carson (1921) and Lord Radcliffe (1949).

After his retirement, Sumption sat on the Supplementary Panel of the Supreme Court from 13 December 2018 to 30 January 2021. He voluntarily retired in 2021 because he considered it inappropriate to serve on the panel in view of his public criticisms of the government.

On 13 December 2019, Sumption was appointed as a Non-Permanent Judge of the Court of Final Appeal in Hong Kong by Hong Kong Chief Executive Carrie Lam. After making his pledge of allegiance to the Hong Kong SAR of the People's Republic of China as part of the judicial oath, Lord Sumption officially commenced his office as a Hong Kong judge on 18 December 2019. He had previously appeared as counsel in the Court of Final Appeal in a number of cases. (Note: For example, Akai Holdings Ltd v Thanakharn Kasikorn Thai Chamkat FACV 16/2009, reported at (2010) 13 HKCFAR 479, and Goldlion Properties Limited v Regent National Enterprises Limited FACV 10/2008, reported at (2009) 12 HKCFAR 512) On 6 June 2024, Lord Sumption resigned as a Non-Permanent Judge together with Lord Collins of Mapesbury, citing the political situation.. He later penned an op-ed on the Financial Times saying Hong Kong is "slowly becoming a totalitarian state," but was criticized.

== Historian ==
=== The Hundred Years' War ===
Sumption's narrative history of the Hundred Years' War between England and France (published in five volumes between 1990 and 2023) has been widely praised as "earning a place alongside Steven Runciman's A History of the Crusades" according to Frederic Raphael, and as a work that "deploys an enormous variety of documentary material ... and interprets it with imaginative and intelligent sympathy" and is "elegantly written" (Rosamond McKitterick, Evening Standard); for Allan Massie it is "An enterprise on a truly Victorian scale ... What is most impressive about this work, apart from the author's mastery of his material and his deployment of it, is his political intelligence". (Note: Quotations from the selection of reviews displayed on the back of The Hundred Years War III: Divided Houses) Volume I (covering the years from the funeral of Charles IV of France in 1329 to the Surrender of Calais in 1347) was first published in 1990. Volume II (covering the years from 1347 to 1369) was published in 1999. Volume III (covering the years from 1369 to 1399) appeared in 2009. Volume IV (covering the years from 1399 to 1422) appeared in 2015, the 600th anniversary of the Battle of Agincourt. Volume V (covering the years from 1422 to 1453) was published in 2023.

Sumption has been praised for a clipped and polished prose style, which he credits to his unwillingness to employ cliché. He admires Edward Gibbon but points out that "if anybody wrote like him today they'd be dismissed as a pompous fart".

== Views ==
Sumption has been described as a "conservative neo-liberal and libertarian." In 1974, he worked with Conservative MP Sir Keith Joseph at the Centre for Policy Studies, an economically liberal think-tank. However, he was a Labour supporter at the time and later voted for Tony Blair.

He has said that an attempt to rapidly achieve gender equality in the Supreme Court through quotas or positive discrimination could end up discouraging the best applicants, as they would no longer believe that the process would select on merit, and "have appalling consequences for justice". He has criticised the judicial appointments process in the United States, where politicians quiz judicial appointees on their views, as "discreditable" and described former Attorney General for England and Wales Sir Geoffrey Cox's proposal for a similar system as, "one of the most ill-thought-out ideas ever to emerge from a resentful government frustrated by its inability to do whatever it likes".

He has criticised the historical curriculum in English schools as "appallingly narrow", warning that by forcing English schoolchildren to study 1918–1945 in isolation they "are being taught about Germany and Europe during its most aberrant period". He believes that history should not be apologised for once perpetrators of injustices are no longer alive, describing apologies for events such as the Irish Famine and the Armenian genocide as "morally worthless", although saying that, "we have a duty to understand why things happened as they did" and there are "lessons to be learned". In the wake of the Black Lives Matter protests following the murder of George Floyd in May 2020 in Minneapolis, the United States, Sumption criticised the removal of monuments, arguing that people of the past did not share the values of the present and calling it "an irrational and absurd thing to do".

In 2023, the New Statesman named him as the 47th most influential right-wing figure in British politics.

=== Brexit ===
He voted to remain in the European Union in the 2016 referendum, describing the decision to leave as, "a serious mistake that will do lasting damage to our economy" and that, "Britain will be dominated by the European Union whether we belong to it or not". Nevertheless, he believed there were strong arguments for Brexit on the grounds of national sovereignty and identity. He said that leavers, "were not mad. They are not irrational, not naive and have not been deceived". He wrote that, "All of these patronising explanations of their decision seems to me to be mere attempts to evade unpalatable truths."

=== Judicial review and politics ===
Sumption has written in detail about his concerns regarding the relationship between the judiciary and politics in several lectures and books, most notably his books Trials of the State: Law and the Decline of Politics (2019) and Law in a Time of Crisis (2021). He argues that since the 1960s, but particularly in recent years, the courts have undermined the political processes and institutions of parliament by judging issues that should be decided by elected politicians and ministers. He specifically critiques the expansion of judicial review, saying that, "It has tended to intrude into areas that belong to parliament and ministers answerable to parliament", and has criticised the interpretative powers conferred by the Human Rights Act 1998. He argues that political figures are more democratically accountable to the public for decisions they make, unlike judges who are unelected and difficult to remove from office. He has criticised the European Court of Human Rights (ECHR), which interprets and adjudicates on the European Convention on Human Rights. He has compared the values of the ECHR and those of the post-war dictatorships of eastern Europe, stating that "they both employ the concept of democracy as a generalised term of approval for a set of political values". He describes the text of the convention as "wholly admirable" but argues that the Strasbourg court has interpreted and developed the rights very broadly to go beyond their original meaning and to the extent that the rights cover issues which are properly the remit of elected legislatures. He has criticised the "living instrument" doctrine, particularly regarding Article 8 of the convention, which he describes as, "the most striking example of this kind of mission creep." He has said that if there was no significant change in the approach of the Strasbourg court then he would support withdrawing from the convention.

=== COVID-19 pandemic ===
Sumption has been highly critical of the British government's lockdowns during the COVID-19 pandemic on civil libertarian grounds, seeing them as a slippery slope, while also criticising the legal basis for their enactment and the enforceability of COVID-19 control measures. He has also questioned whether the virus is serious enough to justify restrictive measures, while also arguing that the effects of lockdowns may be worse than the effects of the actual virus, attracting controversy and debate in British media outlets.

On 17 January 2021, Sumption appeared on The Big Questions to discuss the question of whether the lockdown was "punishing too many for the greater good", and said (with reference to the medical concept of quality-adjusted life years) that "I don't accept that all lives are of equal value. My children's and my grandchildren's life is worth much more than mine because they've got a lot more of it ahead". When a cancer patient taking part in the debate said that he was saying that her life was "not valuable", Sumption interrupted her, saying: "I didn't say your life was not valuable, I said it was less valuable." Health experts have criticised his views, stating that the concept of "quality adjusted life years" is primarily useful for debates on the allocation of scarce healthcare resources, and may not be useful for discussion of a nationwide lockdown.

In July 2021, Full Fact concluded in a fact-checking article that Sumption had "made several mistakes with Covid-19 data when talking about the disease" on BBC Radio 4's Today programme. This included incorrect statements that many recorded COVID-19 deaths were people who had the virus but had died of unrelated causes, that people who had died of COVID-19 "would probably have died within a year after" (on average, British COVID-19 victims lost around a decade of life), and that only "hundreds" of people without pre-existing medical conditions in the UK had died of COVID-19 (the true figure, up to the end of March 2021, was 15,883 in England and Wales alone).

Professor of Health and Law John Coggon critiqued Sumption's philosophical and legal arguments against COVID-19 restrictions in the Journal of Medical Ethics; he also contrasted Sumption's libertarian arguments against such restrictions with arguments he himself had made against the right to die when giving his judgment in R (Nicklinson) v Ministry of Justice, when he argued that the moral principle of sanctity of life should be protected in law.

=== Israel/Palestine ===
In February 2025, Sumption told the Guardian that he thought there was an arguable case that Israel’s conduct in Gaza was genocidal. He also said he was concerned about moves to suppress freedom of speech for supporters of Palestine, particularly in Germany.

In May 2025, Sumption was one of more than 800 signatories to a letter to Keir Starmer saying that the UK should sanction the Israeli government for "war crimes, crimes against humanity and serious violations of international humanitarian law" which they said are being committed in Palestine.

== Personal life ==
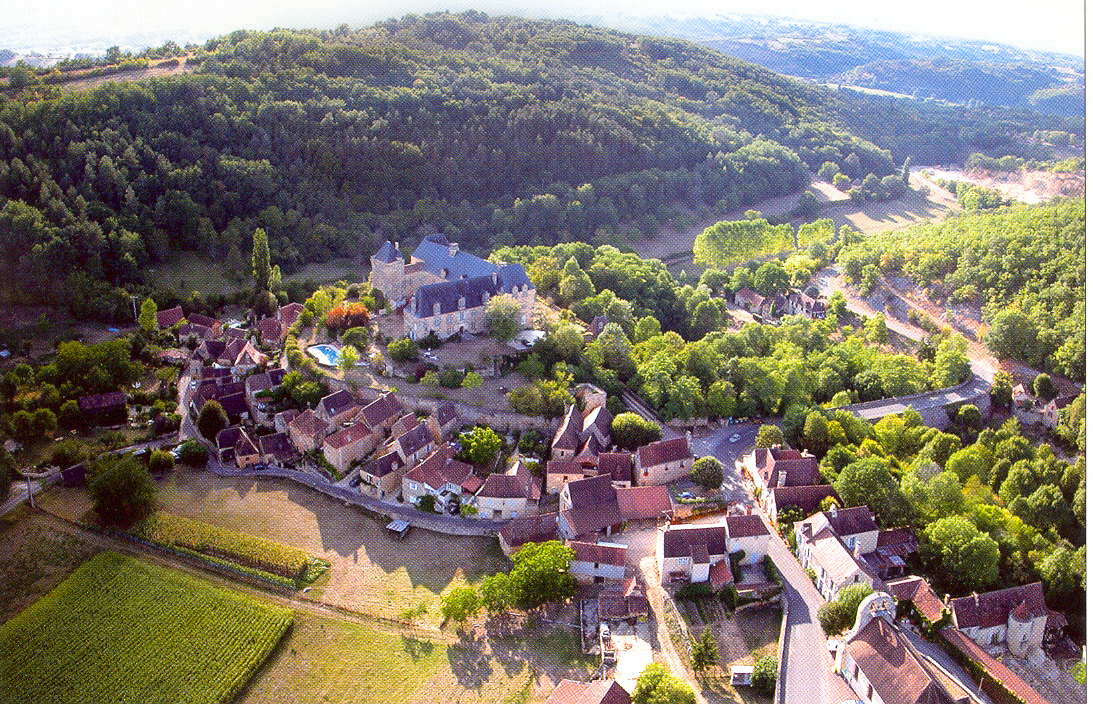
Sumption’s walled chateau in Berbiguières dominates the village

Sumption married Teresa Whelan and they have two daughters, one son, and five grandchildren. He lives in Greenwich and has a second home, a chateau in the village of Berbiguières in the Dordogne in the south of France which he describes as "hard to miss [...] about the size of the rest of the village combined." The Greenwich home is on Crooms Hill opposite billionaire hedge fund manager Chris Rokos.

Sumption speaks French and Italian fluently, and reads Spanish, Dutch, Portuguese, Catalan and Latin. He "rarely learned them using guides, instead I preferred to muddle on through a text with a dictionary by my side."

An opera lover, he is a director of the English National Opera and a governor of the Royal Academy of Music.

== Full style ==
- The Rt Hon Lord Sumption, OBE, FRHistS, FSA, KC, PC

== Notable cases ==
=== As counsel ===
- Lipkin Gorman v Karpnale Ltd [1987] 1 WLR 987
- R v Panel on Takeovers and Mergers Ex parte Datafin Plc [1987] QB 815
- Powdrill v Watson [1995] 2 AC 394
- Re Goldcorp Exchange Ltd [1995] 1 AC 74
- Target Holdings Ltd v Redferns [1996] AC 421
- Westdeutsche Landesbank Girozentrale v Islington LBC [1996] AC 669
- Smith New Court Securities Ltd v Citibank NA [1997] AC 254 (fraud, misrepresentation)
- South Australia Asset Management Corp v York Montague Ltd [1997] AC 191
- Bristol & West Building Society v Mothew [1998] Ch 1
- Investors Compensation Scheme Ltd v West Bromwich Building Society [1998] 1 WLR 896
- Royal Bank of Scotland plc v Etridge (No 2) [2001] UKHL 44
- Dubai Aluminium Co Ltd v Salaam [2002] UKHL 48
- HIH Casualty & General Insurance Ltd v Chase Manhattan Bank [2003] UKHL 6
- Wilson v First County Trust [2003] UKHL 40
- Three Rivers District Council v Bank of England [2004] 3 WLR 1274 (about the collapse of the Bank of Credit and Commerce International)
- Office of Fair Trading v Abbey National plc [2009] UKSC 6, won, representing the Barclays Bank plc.
- Stone & Rolls v Moore Stephens [2009] UKHL 39, won, representing the accountants

=== As judge ===
Two books are dedicated to Sumption's contribution to private and public law, respectively. The following cases are an excerpt of his contribution to the law:

- Kelly v Fraser [2012] UKPC 25 [15], [2013] 1 AC 450 – on apparent authority based on an agent's misrepresentation that the principal had approved the transaction
- Prest v Petrodel Resources Ltd & Ors [2013] UKSC 34, [2013] 2 AC 415 – on piercing the corporate veil
- Bank Mellat v Her Majesty's Treasury (No. 2) [2013] UKSC 39, [2014] 1 AC 700 – On the test of proportionality and the lawfulness of the UK government's sanctions of Bank Mellat
- Virgin Atlantic Airways Ltd v Premium Aircraft Interiors UK Ltd [2013] UKSC 46, [2014] AC 160 – on the rule of res judicata
- Williams v Central Bank of Nigeria [2014] UKSC 10, [2014] AC 1189 – on the correct construction of the Limitation Act 1980 with important remarks on the nature of constructive trust and a claim of knowing receipt
- Coventry v Lawrence [2014] UKSC 13
- R (Nicklinson) v Ministry of Justice [2014] UKSC 38, [2015] AC 657 – On the compatibility of the prohibition of assisting suicide with the European Convention on Human Rights
- R (Lord Carlile of Berriew) v Secretary of State for the Home Department [2014] UKSC 60, [2015] AC 945 – the role of the courts when applying the proportionality test in cases concerning interferences with qualified human rights
- Pham v Secretary of State for the Home Department [2015] UKSC 19, [2015] 1 WLR 1591 – on the development of the common law test of unreasonableness and its relationship with the proportionality test
- Bilta (UK) Ltd v Nazir (No 2) [2015] UKSC 23, [2016] AC 1 – on the rules of attribution in company law
- Papadimitriou v Crédit Agricole Corpn and Investment Bank [2015] UKPC 13, [2015] 1 WLR 4265 – On the fault requirement necessary for liability in knowing receipt
- Bunge SA v Nidera BV [2015] UKSC 43, [2015] 3 All ER 1082 – on the proper assessment date of contractual damages
- Cavendish Square Holding BV v Talal El Makdessi (Rev 3) [2015] UKSC 67, [2016] AC 1172 – on the law of penalty and liquidated damages clause
- Angove's Pty Ltd v Bailey [2016] UKSC 47, [2016] 1 WLR 3179 – on proprietary restitution
- Patel v Mirza [2016] UKSC 42, [2017] AC 467 – dissenting judgment on illegal contracts
- JSC BTA Bank v Ablyazov and another (No 14) [2018] UKSC 19, [2020] AC 727 – on tort of economic loss (joint judgment with Lord Lloyd-Jones)
- Rock Advertising Ltd v MWB Business Exchange Centres Ltd [2018] UKSC 24, [2019] AC 119 – on the effect of a No Oral Modification clause in a contract

== Books ==
- Pilgrimage: An Image of Medieval Religion. Faber & Faber. 1975. ISBN 0-571-10339-1.; re-issued as The Age of Pilgrimage: The Medieval Journey to God. Paulist Press. 2003. ISBN 1-58768-025-4.
- The Albigensian Crusade. Faber. 1978. ISBN 0-571-11064-9.
- Equality. J. Murray. 1979. ISBN 0-7195-3651-0. with Sir Keith Joseph
- The Hundred Years War:
  - The Hundred Years War I: Trial by Battle. Faber & Faber. 1990. ISBN 0-571-13895-0.; paperback (1999) ISBN 978-0-571-20095-5.
  - The Hundred Years War II: Trial by Fire. University of Pennsylvania Press. 1999. ISBN 0-571-13896-9.; paperback (2001) ISBN 0-571-20737-5.
  - The Hundred Years War III: Divided Houses. University of Pennsylvania Press. 2009. ISBN 978-0-571-13897-5.
  - The Hundred Years War IV: Cursed Kings. University of Pennsylvania Press. 2015. ISBN 978-0-571-27454-3.
  - The Hundred Years War V: Triumph and Illusion. Faber & Faber. 2023. ISBN 978-0-571-27457-4.
- Edward III: A Heroic Failure. National Geographic Books. 2016. ISBN 978-0-241-18420-2.
- Trials of the State: Law and the Decline of Politics. Profile Books Limited. 2019. ISBN 978-1-788-16372-9.
- Law in a Time of Crisis. Profile Books Limited. 2021. ISBN 9781788167116.
- The Challenges of Democracy: And The Rule of Law. 2025. ISBN 978-1-805-22250-7.

Legal offices
Preceded by None	Non-Permanent Judge of the Court of Final Appeal of Hong Kong; 2019–2024	Succeeded by None
