= Huang v Home Secretary =

- Court: House of Lords
- Decided: 21 March 2007
- Citation: [2007] UKHL 11

Keywords
- Judicial review; Constitutional Law; Article 8 of ECHR; Immigration Appeal Tribunal (IAT); Article 8 and Immigration Removal; Proportionality

Huang v Secretary of State for the Home Department [2007] UKHL 11 is a UK constitutional law case, concerning judicial review.

== Judgment ==
The House of Lords held Huang and Kashmiri’s cases succeeded. The claimants’ rights needed to be read purposively and in context. An appellate authority, faced with questions under ECHR art 8, had to decide itself whether refusal was lawful, and was not a secondary reviewing body exercising deference where irrationality or something else had to be established. Lord Bingham said the following:

13. In the course of his justly-celebrated and much-quoted opinion in R (Daly) v Secretary of State for the Home Department [2001] UKHL 26, [2001] 2 AC 532, paras 26-28, Lord Steyn pointed out that neither the traditional approach to judicial review formulated in Associated Provincial Picture Houses Ltd v Wednesbury Corporation [1948] 1 KB 223 nor the heightened scrutiny approach adopted in R v Ministry of Defence, Ex p Smith [1996] QB 517 had provided adequate protection of Convention rights, as held by the Strasbourg court in Smith and Grady v United Kingdom (1999) 29 EHRR 493. Having referred to a material difference between the Wednesbury and Smith approach on the one hand and the proportionality approach applicable where Convention rights are at stake on the other, he said (para 28): "This does not mean that there has been a shift to merits review". This statement has, it seems, given rise to some misunderstanding. The policy attacked in Daly was held to be ultra vires the Prison Act 1952 (para 21) and also a breach of article 8. With both those conclusions Lord Steyn agreed (para 24). They depended on questions of pure legal principle, on which the House ruled. Ex p Smith was different. It raised a rationality challenge to the recruitment policy adopted by the Ministry of Defence which both the Divisional Court and the Court of Appeal felt themselves bound to dismiss. The point which, as we understand, Lord Steyn wished to make was that, although the Convention calls for a more exacting standard of review, it remains the case that the judge is not the primary decision-maker. It is not for him to decide what the recruitment policy for the armed forces should be. In proceedings under the Human Rights Act, of course, the court would have to scrutinise the policy and any justification advanced for it to see whether there was sufficient justification for the discriminatory treatment. By contrast, the appellate immigration authority, deciding an appeal under section 65, is not reviewing the decision of another decision-maker. It is deciding whether or not it is unlawful to refuse leave to enter or remain, and it is doing so on the basis of up to date facts.

The task of the appellate immigration authority

14. Much argument was directed on the hearing of these appeals, and much authority cited, on the appellate immigration authority's proper approach to its task, due deference, discretionary areas of judgment, the margin of appreciation, democratic accountability, relative institutional competence, a distinction drawn by the Court of Appeal between decisions based on policy and decisions not so based, and so on. We think, with respect, that there has been a tendency, both in the arguments addressed to the courts and in the judgments of the courts, to complicate and mystify what is not, in principle, a hard task to define, however difficult the task is, in practice, to perform. In describing it, we continue to assume that the applicant does not qualify for leave to enter or remain under the Rules, and that reliance is placed on the family life component of article 8.

15. The first task of the appellate immigration authority is to establish the relevant facts. These may well have changed since the original decision was made. In any event, particularly where the applicant has not been interviewed, the authority will be much better placed to investigate the facts, test the evidence, assess the sincerity of the applicant's evidence and the genuineness of his or her concerns and evaluate the nature and strength of the family bond in the particular case. It is important that the facts are explored, and summarised in the decision, with care, since they will always be important and often decisive.

16. The authority will wish to consider and weigh all that tells in favour of the refusal of leave which is challenged, with particular reference to justification under article 8(2). There will, in almost any case, be certain general considerations to bear in mind: the general administrative desirability of applying known rules if a system of immigration control is to be workable, predictable, consistent and fair as between one applicant and another; the damage to good administration and effective control if a system is perceived by applicants internationally to be unduly porous, unpredictable or perfunctory; the need to discourage non-nationals admitted to the country temporarily from believing that they can commit serious crimes and yet be allowed to remain; the need to discourage fraud, deception and deliberate breaches of the law; and so on. In some cases much more particular reasons will be relied on to justify refusal, as in Samaroo v Secretary of State for the Home Department [2001] EWCA Civ 1139, [2002] INLR 55 where attention was paid to the Secretary of State's judgment that deportation was a valuable deterrent to actual or prospective drug traffickers, or R (Farrakhan) v Secretary of State for the Home Department [2002] EWCA Civ 606, [2002] QB 1391, an article 10 case, in which note was taken of the Home Secretary's judgment that the applicant posed a threat to community relations between Muslims and Jews and a potential threat to public order for that reason. The giving of weight to factors such as these is not, in our opinion, aptly described as deference: it is performance of the ordinary judicial task of weighing up the competing considerations on each side and according appropriate weight to the judgment of a person with responsibility for a given subject matter and access to special sources of knowledge and advice. That is how any rational judicial decision-maker is likely to proceed. It is to be noted that both Samaroo and Farrakhan (cases on which the Secretary of State seeks to place especial reliance as examples of the court attaching very considerable weight to decisions of his taken in an immigration context) were not merely challenges by way of judicial review rather than appeals but cases where Parliament had specifically excluded any right of appeal.

17. Counsel for the Secretary of State nevertheless put his case much higher even than that. She relied by analogy on the decision of the House in Kay v Lambeth London Borough Council [2006] UKHL 10, [2006] 2 AC 465, where the House considered the article 8 right to respect for the home. It held that the right of a public authority landlord to enforce a claim for possession under domestic law against an occupier whose right to occupy (if any) had ended and who was entitled to no protection in domestic law would in most cases automatically supply the justification required by article 8(2), and the courts would assume that domestic law struck the proper balance, at any rate unless the contrary were shown. So here, it was said, the appellate immigration authority should assume that the Immigration Rules and supplementary instructions, made by the responsible minister and laid before Parliament, had the imprimatur of democratic approval and should be taken to strike the right balance between the interests of the individual and those of the community. The analogy is unpersuasive. Domestic housing policy has been a continuing subject of discussion and debate in Parliament over very many years, with the competing interests of landlords and tenants fully represented, as also the public interest in securing accommodation for the indigent, averting homelessness and making the best use of finite public resources. The outcome, changed from time to time, may truly be said to represent a considered democratic compromise. This cannot be said in the same way of the Immigration Rules and supplementary instructions, which are not the product of active debate in Parliament, where non-nationals seeking leave to enter or remain are not in any event represented. It must be remembered that if an applicant qualifies for the grant of leave to enter or remain under the Rules and is refused leave, the immigration appeal authority must allow such applicant's appeal by virtue of paragraph 21(1)(a) of Part III of Schedule 4 to the 1999 Act. It is a premise of the statutory scheme enacted by Parliament that an applicant may fail to qualify under the Rules and yet may have a valid claim by virtue of article 8.

18. The authority must of course take account, as enjoined by section 2 of the 1998 Act, of Strasbourg jurisprudence on the meaning and effect of article 8. While the case law of the Strasbourg court is not strictly binding, it has been held that domestic courts and tribunals should, in the absence of special circumstances, follow the clear and constant jurisprudence of that court: R (Alconbury Developments Ltd) v Secretary of State for the Environment, Transport and the Regions [2001] UKHL 23, [2003] 2 AC 295, para 26; R (Ullah) v Special Adjudicator [2004] UKHL 26, [2004] 2 AC 323, para 20. It is unnecessary for present purposes to attempt to summarise the Convention jurisprudence on article 8, save to record that the article imposes on member states not only a negative duty to refrain from unjustified interference with a person's right to respect for his or her family but also a positive duty to show respect for it. The reported cases are of value in showing where, in many different factual situations, the Strasbourg court, as the ultimate guardian of Convention rights, has drawn the line, thus guiding national authorities in making their own decisions. But the main importance of the case law is in illuminating the core value which article 8 exists to protect. This is not, perhaps, hard to recognise. Human beings are social animals. They depend on others. Their family, or extended family, is the group on which many people most heavily depend, socially, emotionally and often financially. There comes a point at which, for some, prolonged and unavoidable separation from this group seriously inhibits their ability to live full and fulfilling lives. Matters such as the age, health and vulnerability of the applicant, the closeness and previous history of the family, the applicant's dependence on the financial and emotional support of the family, the prevailing cultural tradition and conditions in the country of origin and many other factors may all be relevant. The Strasbourg court has repeatedly recognised the general right of states to control the entry and residence of non-nationals, and repeatedly acknowledged that the Convention confers no right on individuals or families to choose where they prefer to live. In most cases where the applicants complain of a violation of their article 8 rights, in a case where the impugned decision is authorised by law for a legitimate object and the interference (or lack of respect) is of sufficient seriousness to engage the operation of article 8, the crucial question is likely to be whether the interference (or lack of respect) complained of is proportionate to the legitimate end sought to be achieved. Proportionality is a subject of such importance as to require separate treatment.

Proportionality

19. In de Freitas v Permanent Secretary of Ministry of Agriculture, Fisheries, Lands and Housing [1999] 1 AC 69, 80, the Privy Council, drawing on South African, Canadian and Zimbabwean authority, defined the questions generally to be asked in deciding whether a measure is proportionate:

"whether: (i) the legislative objective is sufficiently important to justify limiting a fundamental right; (ii) the measures designed to meet the legislative objective are rationally connected to it; and (iii) the means used to impair the right or freedom are no more than is necessary to accomplish the objective."

This formulation has been widely cited and applied. But counsel for the applicants (with the support of Liberty, in a valuable written intervention) suggested that the formulation was deficient in omitting reference to an overriding requirement which featured in the judgment of Dickson CJ in R v Oakes [1986] 1 SCR 103, from which this approach to proportionality derives. This feature is (p 139) the need to balance the interests of society with those of individuals and groups. This is indeed an aspect which should never be overlooked or discounted. The House recognised as much in R (Razgar) v Secretary of State for the Home Department [2004] UKHL 27, [2004] 2 AC 368, paras 17-20, 26, 27, 60, 77, when, having suggested a series of questions which an adjudicator would have to ask and answer in deciding a Convention question, it said that the judgment on proportionality

"must always involve the striking of a fair balance between the rights of the individual and the interests of the community which is inherent in the whole of the Convention. The severity and consequences of the interference will call for careful assessment at this stage" (see para 20).

If, as counsel suggest, insufficient attention has been paid to this requirement, the failure should be made good.

20. In an article 8 case where this question is reached, the ultimate question for the appellate immigration authority is whether the refusal of leave to enter or remain, in circumstances where the life of the family cannot reasonably be expected to be enjoyed elsewhere, taking full account of all considerations weighing in favour of the refusal, prejudices the family life of the applicant in a manner sufficiently serious to amount to a breach of the fundamental right protected by article 8. If the answer to this question is affirmative, the refusal is unlawful and the authority must so decide. It is not necessary that the appellate immigration authority, directing itself along the lines indicated in this opinion, need ask in addition whether the case meets a test of exceptionality. The suggestion that it should is based on an observation of Lord Bingham in Razgar above, para 20. He was there expressing an expectation, shared with the Immigration Appeal Tribunal, that the number of claimants not covered by the Rules and supplementary directions but entitled to succeed under article 8 would be a very small minority. That is still his expectation. But he was not purporting to lay down a legal test.

Disposal

21. Mrs Huang was successful in her appeal to an adjudicator, but that decision was reversed on the Secretary of State's appeal to the Immigration Appeal Tribunal. Mr Kashmiri was unsuccessful before both the adjudicator and the Immigration Appeal Tribunal. The Court of Appeal ([2006] QB 1, para 63) found the decisions of the Tribunal in each case to be legally defective, since both, following the approach laid down in M (Croatia) v Secretary of State for the Home Department [2004] INLR 327, adopted a review approach incorrectly based on deference to the Secretary of State's view of proportionality. In the case of Mrs Huang, the Court of Appeal considered that a tribunal might, properly directing itself, find that she had a valid claim under article 8 although she could not qualify under the Rules. It therefore allowed her appeal and remitted her case to the Immigration Appeal Tribunal. In the case of Mr Kashmiri the Court of Appeal was of opinion that a tribunal properly directing itself could not have upheld his claim. It therefore dismissed his appeal.

22. As already indicated, we agree with the Court of Appeal's criticism of the standard of review applied by the Immigration Appeal Tribunal in these two cases. We would accordingly dismiss the Secretary of State's appeal in Mrs Huang's case, and uphold the Court of Appeal's order. In Mr Kashmiri's case, the Secretary of State did not seek to uphold the Court of Appeal's order if the House should find that the Immigration Appeal Tribunal had misdirected itself, fairly accepting that Mr Kashmiri was entitled to a decision by a properly directed tribunal. We would accordingly allow his appeal, and remit his case also to the tribunal. Both cases, therefore, are now remitted to be heard before the unified appellate body, the Asylum and Immigration Tribunal. In Mrs Huang's case, the costs order made by the Court of Appeal will stand. The Secretary of State must pay her costs of this appeal to the House. The Secretary of State must pay Mr Kashmiri's costs in the Court of Appeal and the House.

Lord Hoffmann, Baroness Hale, Lord Carswell and Lord Brown agreed.

== See also ==
- UK constitutional law
- E v Secretary of State for the Home Department (Appeal involving the Immigration Appeal Tribunal (IAT) and new evidence)
