= James Holman (disambiguation) =

James Holman (1786–1857) was a British adventurer and author.

James Holman may also refer to:

- James Holman (judge) (born 1947), British judge
- James Sanders Holman (1804–1867), mayor of Houston, Texas
- J. Martin Holman (James Martin Holman, Jr., born 1957), literary translator, professor, puppeteer
- Cliff Holman (James Clifton Holman, Jr., 1929–2008), Birmingham, Alabama, television personality
- James Holman (racing driver), see 2014 Legend SuperCup season
