= Abrogation in public law =

Abrogation in UK public law

In United Kingdom public law, abrogation refers to the repealing, annulment, or overriding of a law, legal right, or constitutional value. The term is also used in administrative litigation to describe the proposing away of a right, power or value, when a public body unlawfully delegates its power or fails to execute its mandatory responsibilities or duties. The abrogation of such a responsibility or duty, unless required by primary legislation would amount to an unlawful delegation of power or a fettering of public discretion, and can in international cases involve an unconstitutional delegation of power to a foreign government or other sovereign power. Abrogation is a conceptual framework frequently used by the courts to evaluate the lawful limits of state power.

It is a protected value at Common Law that Parliament has legislative supremacy (Note: According to Laws J in R (Misick) v Secretary of State for Foreign and Commonwealth Affairs [2009] EWCA Civ 1549 at [12], ″Parliament's power to make any law of its choosing is unconfined.″) even to the point that the sovereign power extends to the breaking of treaties, if need be. Although Parliament has the authority to alter or limit the ambit of judicial review, it cannot abrogate the court review process entirely or preclude the interpretation of the law completely from the work of the courts.

== Delegation of responsibility ==
In the judicial review R (on the application of Andrew Michael March) v Secretary of State for Health which challenged the UK Department of Health's decision not to implement Recommendation 6(h) of the Archer Independent Inquiry, there was reference to abrogation in the 2009 legal papers of both the defendant and the claimant which led up to the hearing the following year. The claim form, dated 18 August 2009, originally included the additional ground that Government took into account irrelevant considerations. The claimant suggested that Government had abrogated their responsibility: "In basing the Decision on its own assessment of fault the Government has taken an irrelevant consideration into account and thereby abrogated its responsibility to the victims to compensate them adequately for living with HIV and/or Hepatitis C."

In contrast, the Defendant's Summary Grounds of Defence claimed that implementing Recommendation 6(h) would be impractical and unworkable, and asserted that: "...It would require the Defendant to abrogate decision-making responsibility for the level of ex gratia payments in the UK and defer to the resourcing decisions by the government of another sovereign state operating under different fiscal constraints and policy circumstances. This would itself be irrational and would constitute an unconstitutional delegation of power to a foreign government."

=== Presumption against implied abrogation ===
In UK administrative law, courts operate under a strict structural presumption against the implied abrogation of public responsibilities or statutory protections. As noted by S.A. de Smith in the foundational first edition of Judicial Review of Administrative Action (1959), this includes a robust common law "presumption against implied abrogation of the disqualifications" regarding official bias and interest. Consequently, a public authority's core discretionary or judicial functions cannot be implicitly set aside or carved away through vague subordinate measures or unauthorised delegations; Parliament must instead use clear, explicit, and unambiguous statutory language.

This exact requirement for explicit parliamentary authorisation was firmly demonstrated in Vine v National Dock Labour Board (1956), where the House of Lords ruled that a statutory body cannot delegate its core disciplinary or quasi-judicial functions to an unauthorised sub-committee in the absence of an express legislative provision.

Similarly, in Barnard v National Dock Labour Board (1953), the Court of Appeal held that where a statutory scheme assigns disciplinary suspension powers to a specific local board, those functions are quasi-judicial and cannot be validly delegated to a port manager; any such purported executive action is an absolute nullity.

=== Statutory exclusion and judicial review ===
The presumption against implied abrogation applies not only to the shifting of duties between administrative bodies, but also to statutory attempts to exclude judicial oversight from the administrative process. When public responsibilities are statutory or delegated to specialised tribunals, legislation may include ouster clauses, which are legal provisions explicitly designed to preclude the courts from reviewing those administrative actions. Judicial evaluation of statutory abrogation forms a central component of the overarching constitutional framework used by the courts to determine the lawful limits of state power.

In the landmark case Anisminic Ltd v Foreign Compensation Commission 2 AC 147, the House of Lords encountered a statutory provision stating that determinations made by the Commission "shall not be called into question in any court of law." The judiciary interpreted this clause with strict narrowness. The court ruled that an ultra vires or legally flawed decision was a nullity, and therefore did not constitute a true "determination" under the Act. As noted by Sir John Laws, courts operate under a strict baseline assumption that Parliament does not intend the core principles of judicial review to be abrogated via general ouster clauses, meaning that a total exclusion of review requires an extraordinary threshold of clarity. By refusing to let general statutory language shield an unlawful administrative act, the court firmly established that Parliament cannot implicitly abrogate the judiciary's constitutional function to review executive legality.

== Constitutionality ==
The fundamental right of the British people to be governed by an elected legislature and the executive of the United Kingdom should not be violated by anything more than a vesting of law-making responsibility in a delegate power through an Act of Parliament. Parliamentary governing power and the responsibility for law-making should not be abrogated by the transfer of responsibility away from the United Kingdom.

In McWhirter & Anor, R (on the application of) v Secretary of State for Foreign and Commonwealth Affairs [2003], at [17], Lady Justice Arden suggested that the principle that it was not permissible to transfer responsibility for law making and government away from the United Kingdom did not necessarily vitiate Parliamentary supremacy. The reasoning given for the dismissal of this application suggests that abrogation of power (Note: Parliament′s responsibility for law making and government.) may be permissible in certain situations. A possible scenario may arise where Parliament may choose to implement prospective legislation that may not be fully in accordance with existing statute; such as the European Communities Act 1972 or the European Communities (Amendment) Act 2002, and as such, Parliament's unfettered law–making power will not have fully transferred all rights to European bodies under the respective statutes.

=== Scope of constitutional right ===
Within the United Kingdom, the notion of a constitutional right exists despite there being no written constitution. The scope of such a constitutional right is particularly narrow and the State cannot abrogate their power except where a specific piece of legislation or regulation specifically provides for the power to abrogate. As observed in Witham, R (on the application of) v Lord Chancellor [1997], Laws J made it clear that ″General words will not suffice.″ This was applied in Cullen v Chief Constable of the Royal Ulster Constabulary [2003]. This narrow construction was reinforced in R v Secretary of State for the Home Department, ex parte Simms (2000), where the House of Lords ruled that general statutory wording cannot authorise the executive to abrogate fundamental human rights. This protective boundary was heavily reinforced in R (Bancoult) v Foreign and Commonwealth Secretary (2001), where the High Court explicitly relied upon the Simms principle of legality to confirm that fundamental constitutional rights cannot be overridden by general or ambiguous words, as the democratic process requires Parliament to squarely confront the political cost of any such abrogation.

=== Principle of legality ===
The common law principle of legality dictates that general or ambiguous statutory words cannot be interpreted as granting the power to abrogate core constitutional metrics, such as access to justice or human rights. Parliament must not abrogate fundamental rights or values at common law by using ″general or ambiguous words″ and it cannot bestow power upon another body to abrogate such rights or values using similarly nonspecific words. The right to vote, as mentioned in Watkins v Home Office & Ors [2006], is an accepted example of a ′constitutional right′, and as such, in explicating legislation where such a right may have been ″proposed away″ it follows that the principle of legality would become engaged. The Supreme Court extended this protective metric in AXA General Insurance Ltd v Lord Advocate (2011), confirming that the principle of legality prevents subordinate authorities from abrogating common law values through ambiguous clauses.

=== Prerogative powers and abrogation ===
In United Kingdom constitutional law, a major intersection between statute and state power occurs when an Act of Parliament addresses matters previously governed by the Royal Prerogative. Under the principles of parliamentary sovereignty, where a statute covers the same ground as a residual prerogative power, the statute abrogates or displaces that prerogative. This principle was definitively established by the House of Lords in Attorney General v De Keyser's Royal Hotel Ltd [1920] AC 508, where Lord Atkinson noted that when a statute is passed, the executive cannot choose to act under the prerogative to bypass statutory restrictions, as the prerogative power is effectively abated or suspended by the supreme legislative authority. Consequently, the executive branch must operate strictly within the boundaries and duties laid down by Parliament, rather than relying on historical executive privileges.

″However, while acknowledging the force of Lord Reed′s powerful judgment, we do not accept that it follows from this that the 1972 Act either contemplates or accommodates the abrogation of EU law upon the United Kingdom’s withdrawal from the EU Treaties by prerogative act without prior Parliamentary authorisation.″

— UKSC judgment in Miller

In R (Miller) v Secretary of State for Exiting the European Union [2017], it was held that an Act of Parliament would need to be in place before triggering the UK's exit from the EU under Article 50 of the Treaty on European Union. There would needed to have been specific, clear wording for any exiting legislation to be interpreted as affording ministers the authority to withdraw from the EU under section 2 of the European Communities Act 1972 (UK). The abrogation of powers came up in the UKSC′s reasoning since the government were not at liberty to use prerogative powers to change domestic law, nor were they able to use such powers to undermine any existing rights enshrined in primary legislation. If UK statute had been altered as a result of withdrawing from European Union, it would most likely have caused a fundamental change to the constitutional arrangements of the United Kingdom.

=== Executive modification of rights ===
The requirement for explicit legislative authorisation to abrogate rights was heavily reinforced by the United Kingdom Supreme Court in Miller 1 (2017). In that case, the majority held that the executive could not exercise its foreign affairs prerogative to trigger Article 50 of the Treaty on European Union because doing so would inevitably lead to the abrogation of domestic statutory rights established under the European Communities Act 1972. The court confirmed that far-reaching constitutional modifications—including the removal of a primary source of law or the slicing away of existing protections—cannot be implicitly achieved via executive discretion; they strictly demand express language on the face of an Act of Parliament.

The constitutional threshold for executive intervention was further heightened in R (on the application of UNISON) v Lord Chancellor (2017), where the Supreme Court held that the executive cannot utilise broad, general regulatory powers to introduce fees that effectively abrogate the core constitutional right of access to the courts.

== See also ==
- Unconstitutional actions (Constitutionality)
- R (March) v Secretary of State for Health
- R (Miller) v Secretary of State for Exiting the European Union
- Westphalian sovereignty (exclusive state sovereignty)
- Parliamentary sovereignty (a concept in the constitutional law of some parliamentary democracies)
