= Abrogation =

Abrogation may refer to:

- Abrogatio, the Latin term for legal annulment under Roman law
- Abrogation of Old Covenant laws, the ending or setting aside of Old Testament stipulations for the New Testament
- Abrogation doctrine, a doctrine in United States constitutional law
- Naskh (tafsir) (Arabic for abrogation), a genre of Islamic exegesis dealing with morality in Islamic law
- Abrogation in public law, the overriding of a legal right or constitutional value

== See also ==
- Adrogation, a form of adoption in Ancient Rome
- Obrogation, the enacting of a contrary law that is a revocation of a previous law
