= E v Secretary of State for the Home Department =

Court case

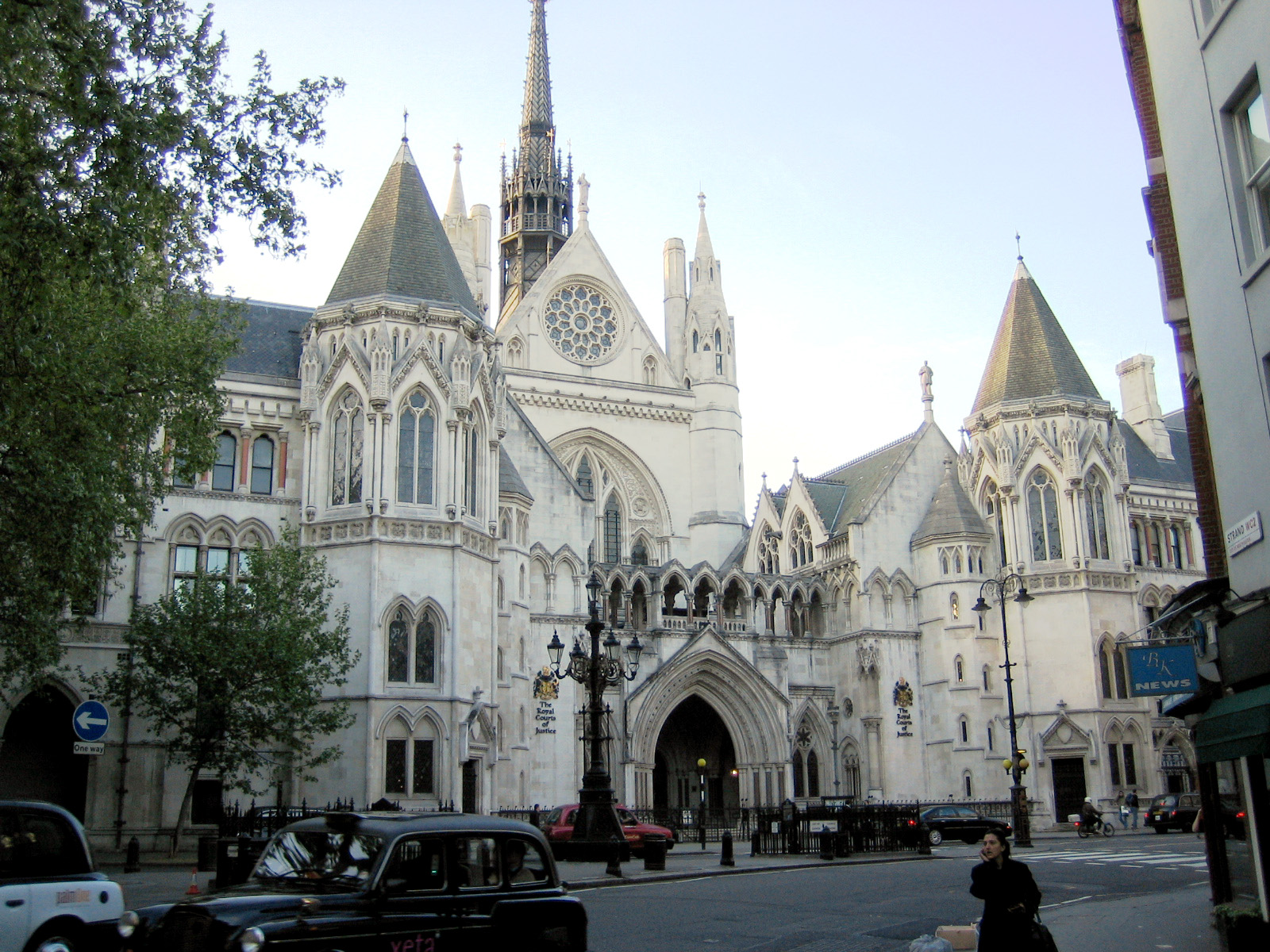
- Court: Court of Appeal (civil division)
- Decided: 2 February 2004
- Citations: E v Secretary of State for the Home Department [2004] EWCA Civ 49 (2 February 2004), Court of Appeal (England and Wales)

Case history
- Appealed from: Immigration Appeal Tribunal

Court membership
- Judges sitting: Lord Phillips of Worth Matravers; Lord Justice Mantell; Lord Justice Carnwath

Case opinions
- Whether new evidence, if admitted, would demonstrate an error of law; New evidence produced after the hearing but before the decision date; Failure to consider new evidence in the context of the power to direct a rehearing

Keywords
- New evidence; Mistake of fact; Material; Statutory appeal on point of law; Power to reopen; Unfairness; Immigration and Asylum; Nationality, Immigration and Asylum Act 2002

E v Secretary of State for the Home Department was a landmark Court of Appeal case of 2004 which significantly developed the doctrine of error of fact as a distinct ground which was taken in conjunction with the question of new evidence (or the most recent decision) being considered in order to establish the error. The case laid out in definitive terms the criteria for the court to review a finding of mistake of fact leading to unfairness. In establishing an error of fact according to the requirements, a duty was identified to consider a decision; in particular, the duty to reopen a matter or direct a rehearing. The question of new evidence produced after the hearing but before the decision date was considered within the context of the power of the Immigration Appeal Tribunal (IAT) to direct a rehearing.

== Facts ==
Two appellants, who had separately claimed asylum in the United Kingdom, were heard jointly in the Court of Appeal. They were known only as ′E′ and ′R′.

=== History of ′E′ ===
′E′ was an Egyptian national who came to the UK from Bangladesh in April 2001 and claimed asylum. ′E′ was considered to be sympathetic to the Muslim Brotherhood, particularly since his father was a member of the society. ′E′ had fled Bangladesh claiming the Egyptian authorities were pursuing him. He needed to renew his passport but could not do so without returning to Egypt. If he were to return, he claimed he would be detained and tortured.

The Home Secretary rejected his claim for asylum and on appeal, this refusal was affirmed by the Adjudicator and the IAT. There was a period of over 5 months between the IAT hearing of 22 October 2002 and the issuing of a decision on 4 April 2003. The tribunal accepted that there was evidence that members of the Muslim Brotherhood were, in fact, being imprisoned and subjected to torture, however, the IAT believed that this was not an ongoing situation, and that this had been short-term detentions due largely to the elections held in Egypt during the year 2000. The tribunal found that the Adjudicator was correct in not deeming the claim made by ′E′ to be especially persuasive and that being a member of the Muslim Brotherhood would not necessarily mean that he would be subject to persecution. The tribunal and Adjudicator did not feel that there was any new evidence before them that ′E′ was in any way part of organisations involved in conflict around the world.

′E′ sought permission to appeal the decision, challenging the narrow aspect of the timing of the arrests; in particular, the finding of the link to the year 2000 elections. He was reliant on what was being described as "subsequent objective evidence" – namely the two reports which had emerged after the hearing, but prior to the promulgation of the decision.

=== History of ′R′ ===
′R′ was an Afghan national who came to the UK in August 2001 and claimed asylum. The grounds for asylum were that ′R′ had converted from Islam to Christianity and, if made to return, would most likely be subject to severe persecution. The IAT rejected the appeal of ′R′, even though the evidence per se was not in dispute. ′R′ applied to the Court of Appeal for permission to appeal on 1 September 2003. New evidence, in the form of an additional Country Information and Policy Unit (CIPU) report of April 2003 was put forward to help substantiate the seriousness of the risk of persecution. Anyone suspected or even accused of conversion to Christianity could face severe punishment and in all likelihood, could be put to death.

Permission to appeal was refused by the IAT because they felt the appeal grounds were inadequate as the CIPU report arrived after the hearing, and they could only decide an appeal on the evidence before them at the time.

== Decision ==
The appeal was allowed on the specific ground that in both the cases of ′E′ and ′R′, the IAT was wrong in failing to consider the new evidence in the context of the tribunal′s discretion to direct a rehearing, and that this evidence was credible and capable, had it been admitted, of demonstrating that there had been an error of law.

The prior position that appeals could only proceed on a matter of law was modified, as the court felt that adhering to this rigidly might lead to unfairness and that a mistake of fact could constitute an error of law. This was considered particularly important in cases where there is a statutory context and the parties are intent on co-operation, even in the absence of a duty to work together.

=== Finding of unfairness ===
The applicants relied on Lord Slynn′s statement as to what represented the law in R v Criminal Injuries Compensation Board, ex parte A (1999). The CICB case engendered the following prerequisites for a finding of unfairness:

- There must have been a mistake as to an existing fact, including a mistake as to the availability of evidence on a particular matter;
- Secondly, the fact or evidence must have been established, in the sense that it was uncontentious and objectively verifiable;
- Thirdly, the appellant (or his advisers) must not have been responsible for the mistake;
- Fourthly, the mistake must have played a material (not necessarily decisive) part in the Tribunal′s reasoning.

== See also ==
- Ladd v Marshall (1954 case about the admissibility of fresh evidence)
- R (Alconbury Developments Ltd) v Secretary of State for the Environment
- R (March) v Secretary of State for Health
- R v Secretary of State for the Home Department, ex parte Simms
- Watkins v Home Office and others
