= R (Corner House Research) v Director of the Serious Fraud Office =

2008 House of Lords case on rule of law

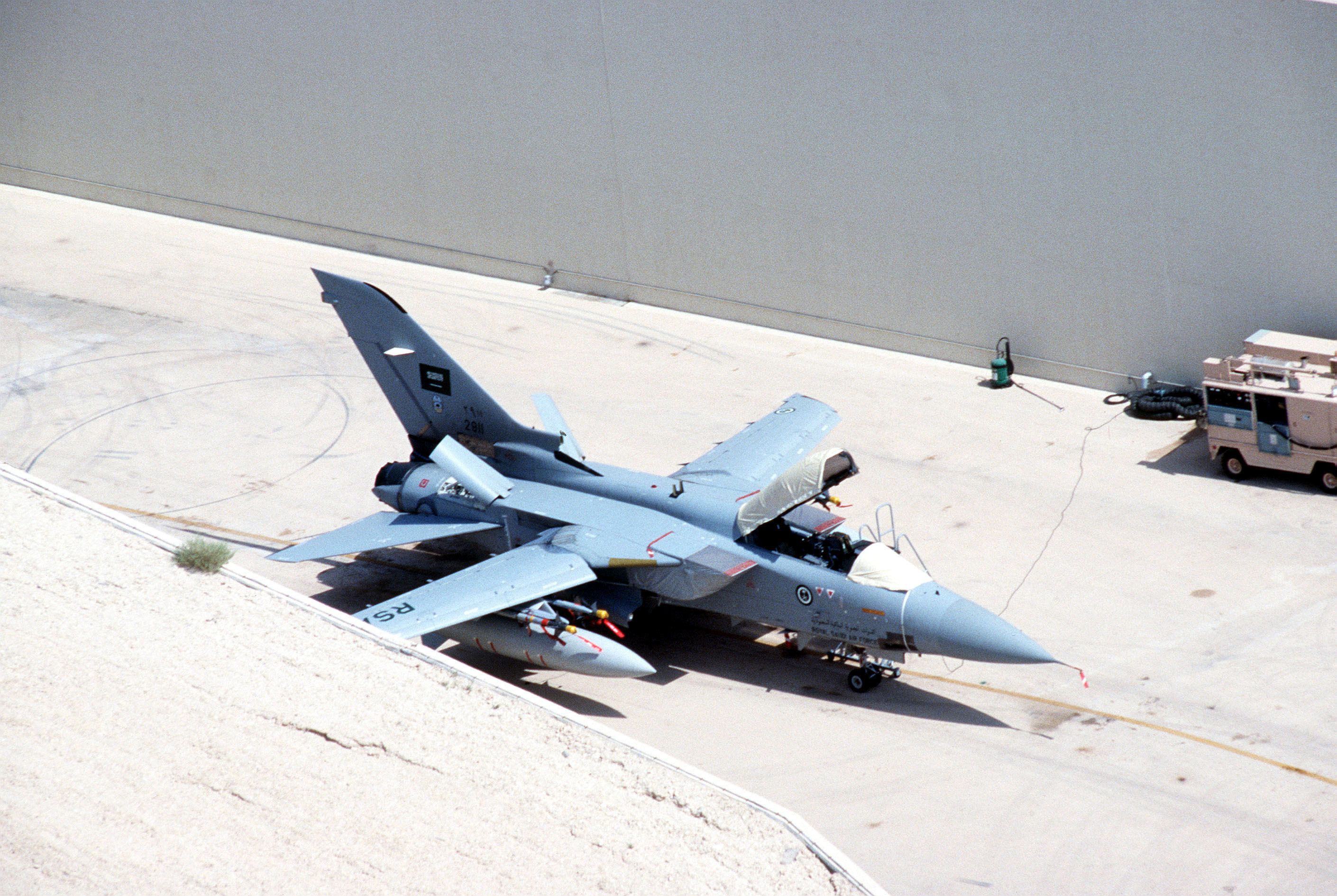
- Saudi Tornado fighters
- Court: House of Lords
- Full case name: R (on the application of Corner House Research and others) v Director of the Serious Fraud Office
- Citation: [2008] UKHL 60

Keywords
- Rule of law

R (Corner House Research) v Director of the Serious Fraud Office [2008] UKHL 60 is a UK constitutional law case, concerning the rule of law.

== Facts ==
Corner House Research is a non-governmental organization involved in the Campaign Against Arms Trade coalition. The Corner House applied for judicial review of the Serious Fraud Office (SFO) decision to stop investigating BAE Systems. The SFO director decided to halt a criminal investigation into alleged bribery in relation to an arms supply contract between BAE Systems and the Saudi Arabian authorities, known as the Al-Yamamah arms deal. The UK government gave arms in return for 600,000 barrels (95,000 cubic metres) of crude oil per day. The first sales were in September 1985, and more recently 72 Eurofighter Typhoons in August 2006. In August 2005 CEO Mike Turner said BAE earned £43bn and could earn £40bn more. In 2010, BAE pleaded guilty to charges in the US of false accounting and making misleading statements. The Serious Fraud Office began to investigate. Saudi Arabia had threatened to take action that would damage UK security if the investigation continued. The SFO dropped the investigation.

== Judgment ==
=== Divisional Court ===
Moses LJ and Sullivan J held the Director of the Serious Fraud Office violated the rule of law by dropping investigation into bribery charges against BAE Systems. In his judgment he said the following.

68. No revolutionary principle needs to be created … we can deploy well-settled principles of public law...

[...]

99. The principle we have identified is that submission to a threat is lawful only when it is demonstrated to a court that there was no alternative course open to the decision-maker.

=== House of Lords ===
The House of Lords held the possible consequences that might flow from pursuing the investigation were considered to be sufficiently serious to persuade the House that the Director’s decision was lawful. Lord Bingham said the following.

39. The decision of the then Attorney General to release Leila Khalid to avert a threat by the PLO to execute Swiss and German hostages was described as "clearly defensible" in Edwards, The Attorney General, Politics and the Public Interest (1984), p 325, and is not criticised by the Divisional Court. It is perhaps the only occasion on which a British public prosecutor has been deflected from what would otherwise have been his duty by a foreign threat. But the case is not easily distinguished. It is true that the threat to the hostages was more direct and immediate than that to the British public in the present case. But the Ambassador did not give the Director to understand that the contingency of which he warned was remote or improbable, the potential loss of life in the present case was much greater and the threat here was to those whose safety it is the primary duty of the British authorities to protect. 41. The Director was confronted by an ugly and obviously unwelcome threat. He had to decide what, if anything, he should do. He did not surrender his discretionary power of decision to any third party, although he did consult the most expert source available to him in the person of the Ambassador and he did, as he was entitled if not bound to do, consult the Attorney General who, however, properly left the decision to him. The issue in these proceedings is not whether his decision was right or wrong, nor whether the Divisional Court or the House agrees with it, but whether it was a decision which the Director was lawfully entitled to make. Such an approach involves no affront to the rule of law, to which the principles of judicial review give effect (see R (Alconbury Developments Ltd) v Secretary of State for the Environment, Transport and the Regions [2001] UKHL 23, [2003] 2 AC 295, para 73, per Lord Hoffmann).

Lord Hoffmann and Lord Rodger agreed.

Baroness Hale said the following.

52. I confess that I would have liked to be able to uphold the decision (if not every aspect of the reasoning) of the Divisional Court. It is extremely distasteful that an independent public official should feel himself obliged to give way to threats of any sort. The Director clearly felt the same for he resisted the extreme pressure under which he was put for as long as he could. The great British public may still believe that it was the risk to British commercial interests which caused him to give way, but the evidence is quite clear that this was not so. He only gave way when he was convinced that the threat of withdrawal of Saudi security co-operation was real and that the consequences would be an equally real risk to “British lives on British streets”. The only question is whether it was lawful for him to take this into account.

53. Put like that, it is difficult to reach any other conclusion than that it was indeed lawful for him to take this into account. But it is not quite as simple as that....

54. ... Eventually, he has to rely on the assurances of others that despite their best endeavours the threats are real and the risks are real.

55. ... He had to weigh the seriousness of the risk, in every sense, against the other public interest considerations. These include the importance of upholding the rule of law and the principle that no-one, including powerful British companies who do business for powerful foreign countries, is above the law.

[...]

57. For these reasons, although I would wish that the world were a better place where honest and conscientious public servants were not put in impossible situations such as this, I agree that his decision was lawful and this appeal must be allowed.

Lord Brown gave a concurring opinion.

58. As Lord Bingham has explained, the Director (and the Attorney General to whose superintendence he was subject) gave prolonged and profound thought to the implications for the rule of law in suspending this investigation in response to the Saudi Arabian threat. It is, indeed, some indication of the Director's recognition of the extreme undesirability of doing so that he stood out for so long. In the end, however, the reality and the gravity of the threat having become ever more apparent to him, he concluded that there was no alternative...

== See also ==
- United Kingdom constitutional law
