= R (March) v Secretary of State for Health =

UK judicial review quashing a decision on the grounds of material error of fact

- Court: High Court of Justice
- Full case name: The Queen (on the application of Andrew Michael March) v The Secretary of State for Health
- Decided: 16 April 2010
- Citations: [2010] EWHC 765 (Admin) [2010] Med LR 271 (2010) 116 BMLR 57

Court membership
- Judge sitting: Mr Justice Holman

Keywords
- Material error of fact; Relevance of Hansard; Ex gratia payments; Contaminated blood products

R (March) v Secretary of State for Health was a 2010 judicial review which challenged the UK Department of Health's decision not to implement Recommendation 6(h) of the Archer Independent Inquiry. The case was important in developing the doctrine of error of fact in public law which previously had not readily been the subject of judicial intervention.

== Facts ==
Andrew Michael March, a haemophiliac, along with several thousand other patients was treated with contaminated blood products in the 1970s and 1980s.

The contaminated blood and blood products disaster also occurred in the Republic of Ireland and various compensation schemes and statutory provisions were put in place between 1991 and 2002 on compassionate grounds, without legal liability on the part of the state. However, the level of payments made to similarly infected and affected people in the Republic of Ireland was considerably greater than payments made to victims in the United Kingdom. In the UK, the Department of Health had consistently refused to increase the ex gratia support payments to be on a par with the more generous levels of payments made in the Republic of Ireland, arguing that liability in the UK had never been established, whilst they claimed in Ireland there had been findings of fault. This was found to be incorrect since the basis behind the Irish scheme was compassion, not fault.

According to the Order handed down by the court, the decision at the centre of the judicial review could be found within a document entitled ″Government Response to Lord Archer’s Independent Report on NHS Supplied Contaminated Blood and Blood Products″. The ministerial decision hinged on the refusal to adopt a key recommendation of the independent, non-statutory Archer Inquiry. In particular, Recommendation 6(h). The rejected recommendation read as follows: ″We suggest that payments should be at least the equivalent of those payable under the scheme which applies at any time in Ireland.″

== Judgment ==
The judgment was handed down in Court 49 of the High Court by Mr Justice Holman on Friday, 16 April 2010, the eve of World Haemophilia Day 2010.

=== Material error of fact ===
I am satisfied that the government′s approach to recommendation 6 (h) has been, and remains, infected by an error.

— Mr Justice Holman

The March case demonstrates that the jurisdiction of the court extends to quashing a decision if the published reasons for the decision contain an error which is considered capable of making a material difference to the outcome of the decision – had the error in question not been made. The sequence of events in Ireland were critical to this case. The Irish government had decided to make payments at a substantial level, very much like compensation, but strictly speaking ex gratia in nature, and they decided to do this before there was any finding of fault. It was the Westminster government's stance on this that propagated the error.

There are a number of conditions which need to be met in order for the court to intervene:

- There must be a demonstrable error to an existing fact;
- The error needs to be sufficiently established;
- The claimant and their legal advisors must not have been party to the error;
- The error of fact needs to be ″material″; in that there could have been an alternative decision ″but for the error″.

=== Admissibility of evidence ===
The thrust of the case on behalf of the claimant is that the answers given by the minister on 23 June and 1 July, when considered separately or cumulatively, reveal a material error of fact on the part of the government as to the situation in Ireland; that that error undermines the reasoning process of the government in their decision to reject recommendation 6 (h); and, accordingly, that the government should be required to reconsider their response to recommendation 6 (h).

— Mr Justice Holman

There was considerable scrutiny over the quality and type of evidence deemed admissible. The use of hansard was permitted by the court due to specific circumstances relating to the decision under review; in particular, the government's reasoning behind their decision. Justice Holman made a clear statement that the court could not go beyond the scope of what was reviewable and could not come to any conclusions about the proceedings of Parliament and whether they were in any way inadequate or inaccurate.

Two answers were issued by the Minister of State at the Department of Health which were considered in turn by the court. A distinction was made out between the two due to the degree of preparation the minister was likely to have had. The first was merely an oral answer given "on the hoof" to a question on 23 June 2009 and thus could not be fully relied on. The second ministerial answer was given on 1 July 2009 as part of a topic–specific debate, so the court felt that this could be relied on by the claimant.

As part of the prepared answer, the Minister of State for the Department of Health, stated:

I stand by the points that I made. Furthermore, a judicial inquiry in Ireland found failures of responsibility by the Irish blood transfusion service and concluded that wrongful acts had been committed. As a result, the Government of the Republic of Ireland decided to make significant payments to those infected...

Since the Minister chose to expand on the published reasons for the decision in responding to questions in Parliament, the court was left with an obligation to examine the government's reasoning, provided it did not trespass on issues such as allocation of resources or political matters. It was the Minister's use of the words ″as a result″ that Holman J pointed to as being factually incorrect, since those words suggested, erroneously, that the significant payments made in the Republic of Ireland were because of findings of wrongful acts and failures of responsibility.

== Significance ==
On the morning the judgment was handed down, the late Lord Morris of Manchester described how he felt the decision was historic for the haemophilia community and how he expected it would be welcomed by the community of some 5,000 people who were infected en masse with HIV and Hepatitis C through contaminated blood and blood products. Lord Morris went on to expand as follows:

…1,974 have died in direct consequence of the NHS treatment. Yet until today the legal road to redress was blocked, just as unbreakably as any prospect of securing justice by legislative means. Now with today’s historic breakthrough in the High Court and the huge public backing for my Contaminated Blood Support for Infected and Bereaved Persons Bill, both roads are open. Our determination to ensure that ′right is done′ is totally vindicated and a just outcome is now in sight.

Following certiorari, the defendant had until 4pm on Monday 7 June 2010 to apply to the Court of Appeal for permission to appeal. By 2 June 2010, the new coalition government had chosen not to appeal the decision of the High Court. There was a period of vacuum following the quashing order, where the government was required by the court to revisit the matter and remake the decision – de novo.

In May 2024, the case was referred to in volume one of The Report of the Infected Blood Inquiry which reaffirmed the conclusion that the Irish government had commenced payment absent any acceptance of being at fault.

== Bibliography ==
- Fordham, Michael (2012). Judicial Review Handbook (6th ed.). Hart Publishing Ltd. ISBN 9781849461597.
- Clements, Richard (2015). Public Law—Blackstone′s questions & answers (Eighth ed.). Oxford University Press. ISBN 9780198715733.
- Endicott, Timothy (2011). Administrative Law (Second ed.). Oxford University Press. ISBN 9780199601752.
- Farrell, Anne-Maree (2012). The Politics of Blood: Ethics, Innovation and the Regulation of Risk. Cambridge University Press. ISBN 9780521193184.

== See also ==
- A and Others v National Blood Authority and Another (Consumer law case involving claimants infected with hepatitis C)
- Abrogation in public law
- CN v Secretary of State for Health and Social Care (Permission appeal challenging non-inclusion of those infected with hepatitis B)
- Contaminated blood scandal in the United Kingdom
- E v Secretary of State for the Home Department – Court case
- M.C. and Others v Italy (Right to property case involving bad blood victims)
