= R v Criminal Injuries Compensation Board, ex parte A =

1999 English House of Lords case

- Court: House of Lords
- Full case name: Regina v Criminal Injuries Compensation Board, ex parte A (A.P.)
- Decided: 25 March 1999
- Citation: [1999] 2 AC 330, [1999] UKHL 21, [1999] 2 WLR 974
- Transcript

Case history
- Prior action: [1999] 2 AC 330; [1999] 2 WLR 974
- Appealed from: Court of Appeal

Court membership
- Judges sitting: Lord Slynn of Hadley; Lord Mackay of Clashfern; Lord Nolan; Lord Clyde; Lord Hobhouse of Woodborough

Keywords
- Quashing a decision on the basis of mistake; Misunderstanding or ignorance of an established and relevant fact; Breach of natural justice; Error of fact; Review on a procedural point; Undue delay; Supreme Court Act 1981 (31)

R v Criminal Injuries Compensation Board, ex parte A was a 1999 case in the United Kingdom where a decision by the Criminal Injuries Compensation Board (CICB) not to award compensation was quashed by the House of Lords as it was deemed to be a breach of the rules of natural justice. The case reaffirmed the principle of "misunderstanding or ignorance of an established and relevant fact" and further developed the doctrine of error of fact, in that a decision could be quashed on the basis of it having taken into account a factual mistake. The case also dealt with the issue of undue delay and guiding principles were laid out.

== Facts ==
On 25 May 1991, a woman, known only as ′A′, was seriously sexually assaulted by two men during a burglary at her home. In November, some six months later, she sought compensation through the Criminal Injuries Compensation Board. A's application to the CICB was refused verbally on 31 August 1993, and subsequently in writing by the end of 1993.

Five days after the burglary, ′A′ had been examined by a police doctor who had confirmed that the findings of the examination were consistent with the allegation of buggery. ′A′ was told that she did not need to ask for police statements as they would be produced by the police. When A's claim was heard by the CICB, the report by the police doctor was not included, which led to the Board taking the view that the police witnesses believed that no medical evidence was available to support her claim.

== Undue delay ==
When ′A′ made the application for judicial review, she was considerably out of time as the application had not been made within the 3-month period from the date the grounds arose.

The question of leave had been dealt with by the High Court even though A′s application fell outside the time period provided for in Order 53, rule 4, of the Rules of the Supreme Court. The order was granted on 14 February 1995 by Carnwath J. and was described as ″unambiguous″ by Lord Slynn of Hadley, who went on to say that the Court of Appeal did not have jurisdiction to reconsider the question of an extension of time.

=== Effect of the two provisions ===
Lord Slynn cited two provisions as being relevant to the issue of delay: Order 53, rule 4, of the Rules of the Supreme Court (pertaining to good reason for an extension of time) and Section 31 of the Supreme Court Act 1981 (which deals with hardship, prejudice, detriment, and the justification for a refusal of leave). A six–point list was set out in order to help elucidate on the effect of the two provisions:

- When an application for judicial review is made on an ex parte basis, leave can be refused, deferred to the substantive hearing, or granted.
- If good reason can be shown for extending the period, the court has the power to grant leave. On an ex parte application, it is expected that the demonstration of good reason would be from the position of the applicant.
- If leave is granted, an application to set it aside may be made, although the Court of Appeal have stressed that this should not be encouraged.
- Unless set aside, there is no application for leave to apply for judicial review at the substantive hearing since leave will have already been given. The question of leave will not be re–opened at the substantive hearing on the basis that there is no ground for extending time under Order 53, rule 4(1).
- Unless the court sets aside the initial grant without a separate application having been made for that to be done, there is no power to refuse to grant leave at the substantive hearing on the basis of hardship or prejudice or detriment to good administration, as the court would have already granted leave. In effect, it would be too late to refuse leave. The court does, however, have jurisdiction under section 31(6) to refuse to grant relief.
- The questions that fall under the two provisions (good reason for an extension of time) and (hardship, prejudice, detriment, justifying a refusal of leave) may be determined if the application is adjourned to the substantive hearing.

The House of Lords overruled the Court of Appeal's reconsideration because the issue of whether it had been demonstrated that there was good reason for an extension of the time period had already been concluded at the point of A′s application for review and no good reason had been shown for extending the period within the meaning of Order 53, r. 4(1).

== Judgment ==
The Law Lords unanimously allowed the appeal, accepting that there was jurisdiction to quash the Board's decision on the ground of taking into account a mistaken fact leading to a breach of the rules of natural justice, which in turn amounted to ″unfairness″. The Lords preferred to base their decision to quash on the ground of unfairness and left the question of review as to error of fact—an area of law in a state of flux—to be considered at a later time.

Lord Hobhouse of Woodborough in his closing comments said that the decision would be remitted to the Criminal Injuries Compensation Board.

== See also ==
- E v Secretary of State for the Home Department – Court case
- R (March) v Secretary of State for Health – judicial review quashing a decision on the grounds of material error of fact
- R v Secretary of State for the Home Department, ex parte Fire Brigades Union
