= Trials of the State =

2020 book by Jonathan Sumption

Trials of the State: Law and the Decline of Politics
- First edition
- Author: Jonathan Sumption
- Language: English
- Subject: Politics
- Publisher: Profile Books, London
- Publication date: 29 August 2019
- Publication place: United Kingdom
- Media type: Print (hardback and paperback)
- Pages: 128
- ISBN: 1-788-16372-9
- Dewey Decimal: 340.115

Trials of the State: Law and the Decline of Politics is a 2019 book by UK author, historian, former Justice of the UK Supreme Court, and former Non-Permanent Judge of the Hong Kong Court of Final Appeal Jonathan Sumption, Lord Sumption, in which the content of his BBC's Reith Lectures have been published in book form. Sumption's lectures were delivered in front of a studio audience and were followed by question and answer sessions. Sumption used transcriptions of these lectures (with some notable changes) to prepare the book.

The central thesis of the book is Sumption's argument that in recent years, judicial law has undermined legislation and political process. This is because he argues that in political realms, rather than in courts, there is more accountability, especially from the public.

In the book, Sumption expresses his concern that judges can be allowed to circumvent parliamentary legislation and can review the merits of policy decisions, and the trouble with giving judges this power is they are not constitutionally accountable to anyone for what they do. In his view, this is particularly problematic when it comes to human rights laws, which "transforms controversial political issues into questions of law for the Courts. In this way it takes critical decision-making powers out of the political process’.
