= R v Secretary of State for the Home Department, ex parte Fire Brigades Union =

- Court: House of Lords
- Decided: 5 April 1995
- Citation: [1995] 2 AC 513, [1995] 2 All ER 244, [1995] 2 WLR 464
- Transcript

Case history
- Prior action: [1995] 1 All ER 888
- Appealed from: Court of Appeal
- Subsequent action: None

Court membership
- Judges sitting: Lord Keith of Kinkel, Lord Browne-Wilkinson, Lord Mustill, Lord Lloyd of Berwick, Lord Nicholls of Birkenhead

Keywords
- Judicial review

R v Secretary of State for the Home Department, ex parte Fire Brigades Union [1995] UKHL 3 is a House of Lords case concerning the awarding of compensation under the Criminal Injuries Compensation Scheme. The case is considered significant in constitutional terms for its ruling on the extent of ministerial prerogative powers.

== Facts ==
The Fire Brigades Union, representing members who had been victims of violent crimes, claimed that the Secretary of State (meaning in this case the Home Secretary, Michael Howard) had a statutory duty to bring a new Criminal Injuries Compensation Scheme into force. The Criminal Justice Act 1988 provided compensation to violent crime victims, calculated on the same basis as actions in tort, but under Section 171, would only come into force "on such day as the Secretary of State may ... appoint". The Secretary of State had not appointed a day, and in 1993 said they would not. A compensation scheme had been running since 1964 under the Crown's prerogative power, but instead of moving to a statutory scheme, the Secretary of State said that a new non-statutory tariff scheme would be introduced with compensation fixed according to tariffs, that were less beneficial than the common law.

In July 1994, the House of Commons, by the Appropriation Act 1994, approved the supply of money for these tariffs for the criminal injury compensation scheme. The FBU argued the Secretary of State had:

- acted unlawfully under the Criminal Justice Act by failing or refusing to bring the scheme into force, and
- abused his prerogative powers.

The Court of Appeal ruled that there was no enforceable duty on the Home Secretary to bring the legislation into force at any particular time. The Home Secretary was held to have the discretion to implement the legislation when he felt it was appropriate and to compel the Home Secretary to act would be to interfere with the legislative process. However, it would be an abuse of power to not implement the legislation as the Home Secretary was under a duty to keep the question of when the legislation should be implemented under review.

== Judgment ==
The House of Lords held by a majority that Section 107 of the Criminal Justice Act 1988 imposed a continuing duty on the Secretary of State to consider whether to bring the statutory scheme into force under Sections 108–117, and that he could not lawfully bind himself to not exercise the discretion that was conferred on him. The tariff scheme was also held to be inconsistent with the statutory scheme. This meant the Secretary of State's decision to not bring Sections 108–117 into force and introduce the tariff scheme had been unlawful. However, Section 171(1) did not impose a legally enforceable duty on the Secretary of State to bring Sections 108–117 into force at any particular time.

== See also ==
- UK constitutional law
- R v Criminal Injuries Compensation Board, ex parte A
