= Delegata potestas non potest delegari =

Legal phrase

Delegata potestas non potest delegari is a principle in constitutional and administrative law that means in Latin that "no delegated powers can be further delegated". Alternatively, it can be stated delegatus non potest delegare ("one to whom power is delegated cannot himself further delegate that power").

The principle is present in several jurisdictions such as that of the United States, the United Kingdom and India as well as in Catholic canon law.

== Australia ==
In Australia the maxim has been largely superseded by statute and common law. There is a long line of authorities applying the Carltona principles to Australia.

However, courts have found that where a statute expressly requires a personal action, such delegation is not possible.

In Dooney the High Court of Australia (Callinan J), observed that "No permanent head of a department in the Public Service is expected to discharge personally all the duties which are performed in his name and for which he is accountable to the responsible Minister."

This case law has been backed up by legislation. Section 34AA and 34AAB of the federal government's Acts Interpretation Act 1901 clearly create a statutory power to delegate, contrary to the maxim. The federal legislation is echoed in some state legislation.

Section 34AB(1)(b), however, prohibits a delegate to further delegate; consequently a Minister delegating to a Secretary does not allow the Secretary to delegate to an Assistant Secretary. Vestiges of the maxim have therefore been preserved by the Act.

== Canada ==
The principle was summarised in Canada in 1943, in an article in the Canadian Bar Review by John Willis. While it is acknowledged as "the seminal articulation of the law governing the subdelegation of statutory and discretionary powers" and it is still often cited, it has not achieved the rigid standing that was originally intended. The maxim has had some success as an operating principle in the restriction of delegation of legislative and judicial powers, but the demands of modern governmental regulatory practices have inhibited its application in the delegation of administrative powers. Exceptions are rare and dependent on the statute conferring power.

== India ==
In Indian jurisprudence, the principle is applied across both private commercial law and public administrative law:

- Statutory and Administrative Law: The Supreme Court of India established the constitutional boundaries of delegated legislation in the foundational advisory opinion In re Delhi Laws Act (1951), ruling that while ancillary machinery can be delegated, essential legislative functions and policy decisions cannot be shifted away from the legislature. Following this principle the landmark case A K Roy v State of Punjab (1986) reaffirmed that sub-delegation of an essential statutory power is invalid and ultra vires unless the parent Act explicitly or by necessary implication authorises it.
- Contract and Agency Law: The principle is statutory codified under Section 190 of the Indian Contract Act, 1872. It dictates that an ordinary commercial agent cannot lawfully delegate acts they have expressly or impliedly undertaken to perform personally, unless allowed by trade custom or by the essential nature of the agency.

== United Kingdom ==
In the United Kingdom, the concept has been used to question the validity of the Parliament Act 1949, because that Act expanded the power of the House of Commons but was passed solely by that House (under the terms of the Parliament Act 1911) without the consent of the House of Lords.

In English administrative law, a landmark application of this principle occurred in the House of Lords case Vine v National Dock Labour Board [1957] AC 488. The court ruled that a public statutory body, which had been explicitly entrusted by Parliament with disciplinary and quasi-judicial powers to terminate workers' employment, could not validly sub-delegate those responsibilities to an executive subcommittee. Any administrative action or disciplinary decision taken under an unauthorised delegation of power is deemed ab initio ultra vires and void. While the judgment serves as a foundational precedent for the delegata potestas rule, the Law Lords primarily expressed the principle in English terms, emphasising that the ability to delegate turns entirely on the specific construction and nature of the statutory duty.

== United States ==
In the United States, one of the earliest mentions of the principle occurred when it was cited by counsel for one of the litigants before the Supreme Court of Pennsylvania in 1794, in M'Intire v. Cunningham, 1 Yeates 363 (Pa. 1794). The summary of the case reports, "Mr. Wilson had given no power to Noarth to transact his business; but if he even had, it is a maxim, that delegata potestas non potest delegari."

The maxim was first cited by the Supreme Court of the United States in United States v. Sav. Bank, 104 U.S. 728 (1881) in which the case summary reports that one of the litigants argued, "The duty imposed by statute on the commissioner cannot be delegated to a collector. Delegata potestas non potest delegari."

== Catholic canon law ==
Canon 137 of the 1983 Code of Canon Law states:

- § 1 Ordinary executive power can be delegated either for an individual case or for all cases, unless the law expressly provides otherwise.
- § 2 Executive power delegated by the Apostolic See can be subdelegated, either for an individual case or for all cases, unless the delegation was deliberately given to the individual alone, or unless subdelegation was expressly prohibited.
- § 3 Executive power delegated by another authority having ordinary power, if delegated for all cases, can be subdelegated only for individual cases; if delegated for a determinate act or acts, it cannot be subdelegated, except by the express grant of the person delegating.
- § 4 No subdelegated power can again be subdelegated, unless this was expressly granted by the person delegating.
