= Vine v National Dock Labour Board =

1956 UK administrative law case

- Court: House of Lords
- Decided: 7 December 1956
- Citation: [1957] AC 488, [1956] 3 All ER 939

Case history
- Prior actions: Dismissal upheld by local disciplinary committee and appeal tribunal; Ormerod J granted declaration and damages at first instance; Court of Appeal (Jenkins LJ dissenting) struck out the declaration.

Court membership
- Judges sitting: Viscount Simonds, Lord Kilmuir LC, Lord Cohen, Lord Keith of Avonholm, Lord Somervell of Harrow

Case opinions
- A statutory body entrusted with public disciplinary or quasi-judicial functions cannot delegate those powers to a sub-committee or officer without explicit statutory authorisation; action taken without such power is void ab initio.

Laws applied
- Dock Workers (Regulation of Employment) Order 1947

Keywords
- Delegation; Administrative law; Void ab initio; Delegata potestas non potest delegari

Vine v National Dock Labour Board [1957] AC 488 was a foundational English public law case heard by the House of Lords, where it was established that a public body completely abdicates its statutory duty when it improperly hands off its core quasi-judicial or disciplinary functions to a subordinate official or sub-committee. It serves as a definitive authority on unlawful delegation.

== Facts ==
The plaintiff, Mr. Vine, was a registered dock worker in the "reserve pool" employed under a dock labour decasualisation scheme established by the Dock Workers (Regulation of Employment) Order 1947. The National Dock Labour Board was responsible for administering the scheme, which included the power to discipline or dismiss workers for non-compliance with work orders. The National Board was authorised to delegate its geographic powers to local dock labour boards.

Following a complaint regarding Mr. Vine's refusal to carry out a specific work order at the port of Poole, the South Coast Local Dock Labour Board purported to delegate its disciplinary functions to a smaller sub-committee. This sub-committee heard the case, found against Mr. Vine, and issued a notice terminating his employment.

Mr. Vine brought an action against the Board, seeking damages for wrongful dismissal and a declaration that his dismissal was illegal, ultra vires, and void. At first instance, Ormerod J awarded both damages and the declaration. The Court of Appeal struck out the declaration, ruling that damages were an adequate remedy for a contract of personal service. Mr. Vine appealed to the House of Lords.

The statutory scheme created a special employment status rather than an ordinary master-servant relationship, which meant the power to terminate that status was a judicial function too important to delegate and required distinct authority.

== Judgment ==
The Judicial Committee of the House of Lords unanimously allowed the appeal and restored the original declaration, ruling that the dismissal was entirely void.

A sharp line was drawn between purely administrative duties and disciplinary or judicial functions, holding that personal disciplinary powers, in particular, the power to dismiss a worker, cannot be implicitly handed off to a sub-committee.

The Law Lords held that the National Board's statutory disciplinary powers were quasi-judicial in nature and deeply tied to the status of the individual worker. Consequently, the court ruled that the local board had no legal authority to delegate its disciplinary functions to a sub-committee in the absence of express statutory provision.

Lord Somervell of Harrow famously observed that the improper delegation of a public duty or discretionary power is not a minor procedural error, but rather an act that "goes to the root of the jurisdiction," rendering the subsequent decision completely invalid from the outset.

Because an act by an unauthorised delegate is a jurisdictional nullity, the House of Lords demonstrated that public law remedies can fundamentally alter or restore legal status where an ordinary private law contract would only yield damages.

=== Distinction from agency and ratification ===
In UK administrative law, unlawful delegation is strictly distinguished from the private law concept of agency. Under the foundational common law presumption of statutory interpretation—commonly known as the principle of delegata potestas non potest delegari (or delegatus non potest delegare)—when a function is entrusted to a specific public body, it must be executed by that authority alone and cannot be validly sub-delegated to another entity. The House of Lords distinguished the relationship between a statutory body and its committees from a standard principal-agent relationship, holding that while an ordinary commercial principal can generally ratify the unauthorised acts of an agent, this cannot apply to a body entrusted with public duties. While the judgment serves as a foundational precedent for the application of the maxim, the Law Lords primarily expressed the principle in English terms, emphasising that the ability to delegate turns entirely on the specific construction and nature of the statutory duty.

However, following the principles reinforced in Vine and the preceding Court of Appeal decision in Barnard v National Dock Labour Board (1953), an unauthorised disciplinary act by an administrative delegate cannot be validly ratified by the delegating public authority after the fact unless express statutory authority allows it. Because an invalid delegation goes to the root of the body's jurisdiction, the original decision is void ab initio and cannot be cured retrospectively.

== See also ==
- Abrogation in public law
- Delegata potestas non potest delegari
