= Delegation (law) =

Passing an obligation to another person

In contract law and administrative law, delegation (Latin intercessio) is the act of giving another person the responsibility of carrying out the performance agreed to in a contract. Three parties are concerned with this act: the party who had incurred the obligation to perform under the contract is called the delegator; the party who assumes the responsibility of performing this duty is called the delegate; and the party to whom this performance is owed is called the obligee.

== Contract law ==
=== Delegable contracts ===
A delegation will be null and void if it poses any threat to the commercially reasonable expectations of the obligee. For example, a task requiring specialized skills or based on the unique characteristics of the promisee can not be delegated. If a specific celebrity was hired to make a speech, they could not delegate the task to another person, even if the other person would give the same speech, word for word. However, a delegation of performance that does not pose such a threat will be held to be valid. In such a case, the obligee will be under an affirmative duty to cooperate with the delegatee to the extent necessary for the fulfillment of the delegator's obligations

=== Breach of a delegated contract ===
If the delegatee fails to perform satisfactorily, the obligee may elect to treat this failure as a breach of the original contract by the delegator or may assert himself as a third party beneficiary of the contract between the delegator and the delegatee, and can claim all remedies due to a third party beneficiary.

If the delegation is without consideration, the delegator remains liable for nonperformance, while the delegatee will not be liable to anyone for anything. Unlike an assignment, a delegation is virtually always for consideration, and never donative - few people are going to accept the charitable offer to perform a task contracted to someone else.

=== Compare: assignment ===
A parallel concept to delegation is assignment, which occurs when one party transfers his present rights to receive the benefits accruing to the assignor under that contract. A delegation and an assignment can be accomplished at the same time, although the right to sue for nonpayment always stays with delegator. Under the common law, a contract clause prohibiting assignment also prohibits delegation. Another common law rule requires that a party to a contract can not delegate performance that involves special skills or reputation (although it is possible to have a novation under such circumstances).

== Administrative law ==
In Administrative Law (the law that controls government action and decisions) a delegation is the process of handing some administrative action or decision to a subordinate. It is achieved through two mechanisms:

1. Where a statute or Delegated legislation appoints an "authorized person" to manage the power for a minister or CEO. Here the delegate acts in their own name, and the delegation is a position that does not cease with the appointment of a new delegate.
2. In some circumstances a person in whom some power is vested can authorize another person to exercise that power on their behalf. Here the underling is appointed to act as if they were the authorized person, usually for the Administrative necessity of managing huge work loads in a government department. Here the delegate acts in person of the authorized person rather than in their own name, and the delegator can still exercise the powers as necessary even though much of the day-to-day operations are enacted by subordinates.

Concerns often arise when law-making powers are delegated to agencies in administrative law because of agency heads are not elected by the people. However, there are many times when delegating law-making authority to an agency is appropriate, especially when the legislature lacks the capacity or expertise to handle a randomly evolving issue that affects multiple jurisdictions

== See also ==
- Regulatory law
- Delegated legislation
- Delegated legislation in the United Kingdom
- Abrogation in public law
