= Ladd v Marshall =

- Court: Court of Appeal
- Decided: 29 November 1954
- Citation: [1954] 1 WLR 1489; [1954] 3 All ER 745; [1954] EWCA Civ 1

Court membership
- Judges sitting: Denning LJ, Hodson LJ, Parker LJ

Case opinions
- Denning LJ, Hodson LJ and Parker LJ

Keywords
- evidence, appeal

Ladd v Marshall [1954] 1 WLR 1489; [1954] 3 All ER 745 is an English Court of Appeal judgment, which established the criteria for the Court to accept fresh evidence in a case on which a judgment has already been delivered.

== Facts ==
Mr Marshall, the defendant, owned a piece of land in Ashford, Middlesex, consisting of a bungalow attached to a pig holding. The bungalow had been built under a licence from the local authority, who had imposed a condition that the maximum price for which Marshall could sell the bungalow was approximately £1,500. In 1952, despite the licence condition, Marshall offered the property for sale with an asking price of £3,600, and Mr Ladd, the plaintiff, expressed an interest in buying it.

Marshall told Ladd that the sale price was limited to £2,500 (presumably £1,500 for the bungalow and £1,000 for the land, although Marshall did not make this explicit), and a document was drawn up for a sale at this price, with a £50 deposit. However, according to Ladd, he also paid Marshall an additional £1,000 in cash to make up the full sale price. This cash was allegedly counted out "under the table" (as Denning LJ put it – indeed, according to Ladd's testimony, the cash was literally counted out on the carpet rather than on the table where the deposit was handed over) at the bungalow in the presence of Ladd, a friend of his (Mr Warren), Marshall, and Mrs Marshall, Marshall's wife. Marshall did not give Ladd a receipt for the extra £1,000.

On 11 June 1952, Marshall's solicitors informed Ladd that Marshall no longer wanted to proceed with the sale of the property.

== First-instance trial ==
The sale having fallen through, Ladd was under no obligation to pay Marshall the "legitimate" price of £2,500. However, he issued proceedings against Marshall to recover the £1,000 that he claimed to have paid. Marshall denied that there was any such arrangement and that any cash (apart from the £50 deposit) had been handed over. At the trial, in addition to his own testimony, Ladd called Mr Warren and Mrs Marshall as witnesses. Mrs Marshall was reluctant to give evidence against her husband – she would have been able to refuse to do so in a criminal trial, but, in a civil trial, she had no such immunity – and, although she confirmed that a transaction had taken place, she claimed not to remember any details of it whatsoever. Ladd's counsel did not apply for Mrs Marshall to be treated as a hostile witness so that she could be cross-examined, and the first-instance judge (Glyn-Jones J), who did not accept the unsupported testimony of Ladd and Warren, dismissed the case.

Ladd did not appeal against the judgment initially. However, in May 1954, Mr and Mrs Marshall were divorced, and Mrs Marshall contacted Ladd's solicitors to inform them that her earlier testimony had been false, and she was now prepared to state in court that the £1000 had been handed over. Ladd applied to the Court of Appeal for Glyn-Jones J's judgement to be overturned, and for Mrs Marshall's new evidence to be considered by the court.

== Judgment on appeal ==
The Court of Appeal, consisting of Denning LJ, Hodson LJ and Parker LJ, allowed Ladd's appeal to be heard, but refused to admit the testimony of Mrs Marshall. Lord Denning laid down the definitive rule for the admissibility of new evidence:

In order to justify the reception of fresh evidence or a new trial, three conditions must be fulfilled: first, it must be shown that the evidence could not have been obtained with reasonable diligence for use at the trial: second, the evidence must be such that, if given, it would probably have an important influence on the result of the case, though it need not be decisive: thirdly, the evidence must be such as is presumably to be believed, or in other words, it must be apparently credible, though it need not be incontrovertible.

— Lord Justice Denning, [1954] EWCA Civ 1

Mrs Marshall's new evidence failed the "apparently credible" test, as, according to Lord Denning, "a confessed liar cannot usually be accepted as being credible", and there was no satisfactory evidence that Mrs Marshall had been coerced by her husband to lie at the first-instance trial, and no other good reason for her doing so. Hodson and Parker LJJ agreed with Lord Denning on this issue, citing the earlier case of Brown v Dean [1910] AC 373, where Lord Loreburn had stated the principle as: "[new evidence] must at least be such as is presumably to be believed, and if believed would be conclusive." Their Lordships considered that "conclusive", in Lord Loreburn's statement, was too strong a word; Lord Denning's formulation of the principle ("an important influence on the result") was adopted by the courts in all future cases.

The basic principle that guides all such decisions is expressed by the Legal Latin maxim interest reipublicae ut sit finis litium – "It is in the interests of the state that there be an end to litigation".

== Subsequent cases ==
The Civil Procedure Rules (Rule 52.21 para 2b) state "Unless it orders otherwise, the appeal court will not receive evidence which was not before the lower court." The grounds on which the Court will make such an order are still based on Ladd v Marshall. In the case of Muscat v Health Professions Council [2009] EWCA Civ 1090, Smith LJ stated "The Ladd v Marshall principles were indeed at the heart of the exercise of discretion [to admit new evidence]."

== See also ==
- E v Secretary of State for the Home Department (2004 appeal involving new evidence produced after the hearing but before the decision date)
