= Three Rivers DC v Governor of the Bank of England =

Three Rivers District Council v Governor of the Bank of England
- Court: House of Lords
- Full case name: Three Rivers District Council v Governor and Company of The Bank of England
- Citation: [2000] 3 CMLR 205
- Transcript: Full text of decision from BAILII.org

Court membership
- Judges sitting: Lord Steyn; Lord Hope of Craighead; Lord Hutton; Lord Hobhouse of Wood-borough; Lord Millett

Keywords
- Preliminary ruling; Foresight; Foreseeablility; Bad faith; Recklessly indifferent; Hansard statutory interpretation; Misfeasance in public office

Three Rivers District Council v Governor of the Bank of England [2001] UKHL 16 is a UK banking law and EU law case concerning government liability for the protection of depositors and the preliminary ruling procedure in the European Union.

== Facts ==
Depositors in the UK branch of Bank of Credit and Commerce International (BCCI) sought damages from the Bank of England for failing in its supervisory duties. The Bank had granted BCCI authorisation in a way that breached the First Banking Directive 77/780. The government argued that the Directive was not intended to give rights to individual depositors.

Justice Clarke dismissed the action, and the Court of Appeal by a majority (Lord Justices Hirst and Robert Walker, Lord Justice Auld dissenting) dismissed the appeal.

The depositors had to base their claim on the intentional tort of misfeasance in public office because in English law, it was not possible for the regulatory authority to be held liable for negligence in the exercise of its supervisory functions.

== Judgment ==
The House of Lords held that the Directive was only a first step toward mutual recognition of authorisations of member states to credit institutions, and individual depositor protection was not an objective of the Directive. There was no need to refer to the ECJ. The delays and costs of making a reference were great, given the very small likelihood that they would have made a wrong interpretation.

Lord Hope said the Directive did not define a depositor and so did not define the class of persons who might have rights. Article 3(1) obliged member states to require credit institutions to have authority to operate, but BCCI had commenced before the Directive. Articles 6 and 7 did not impose any duty of supervision on national authorities.

== See also ==
- European Union law
- UK banking law
- Watkins v Home Office and others (House of Lords appeal with important implications for the tort of misfeasance in public office)

== Notes ==
This case essentially establishes that the Hansard can be used as an external aid to statutory interpretation.
