= Watkins v Home Office and others =

UKHL appeal with important implications for the tort of misfeasance in public office

- Court: House of Lords
- Decided: 29 March 2006
- Citation: [2006] 2 All ER 353, [2006] 1 Prison LR 268, [2006] 2 WLR 807, [2006] 2 AC 395, [2006] UKHL 17
- Transcript: Full text of decision from BAILII.org

Case history
- Prior action: EWCA Civ 966

Court membership
- Judges sitting: Lord Bingham of Cornhill; Lord Hope of Craighead; Lord Rodger of Earlsferry; Lord Walker of Gestingthorpe; Lord Carswell

Keywords
- Tort of misfeasance in public office; Intention; Financial loss; Proof of damage; Special damages; Material damage; Physical injury; Mental injury; Prison Rules 1999 (Rule 39); Constitutional right; Prisoner′s legal correspondence; Illicit enclosure; Bad faith; Malicious intent; Confidentiality

Watkins v Home Office and others [2006] UKHL 17 was a United Kingdom legal case heard by the House of Lords where the Home Office made an appeal as to whether the tort of misfeasance in public office was actionable in the absence of proof of pecuniary losses or injury of a mental or physical nature. The appeal was upheld, ruling that the tort of misfeasance in public office is never actionable without proof of material damage as defined by Lord Bingham of Cornhill.

== Facts ==
The respondent, Mr Watkins, was a convicted prisoner serving a life sentence and was imprisoned at all times material to the action. As a result of being involved with legal proceedings, he had brought about correspondence with his legal advisors, the courts and other bodies. Mr Watkins was held at two prisons, Wakefield Prison and subsequently, Frankland Prison. He raised a number of complaints that his mail had been opened and read at both prisons, breaching the prison rules; in particular, breaching the protection of confidentiality of his legal correspondence under the provisions of Rule 37A of the Prison Rules 1964 and Rule 39 of the Prison Rules 1999. The rules provided that a prisoner′s legal correspondence could only be opened and read if the governor had reasonable cause to believe that the mail contained an ′illicit enclosure′.

Mr Watkins issued proceedings against the Home Office and fourteen named prison officers, claiming damages for misfeasance in public office. He claimed that the officer′s interference with his mail had been deliberate and malicious and that this established the necessary element of intent for the tort of misfeasance in public office to apply.

The action was first heard on 15 July 2003 at Leeds County Court before Judge Ibbotson who found in favour of the defendants, despite finding that three of the fourteen prison officers had acted in bad faith when dealing with the claimant′s legal correspondence. For the tort of misfeasance in public office to be actionable, the claimant would have to show that he had suffered loss or damage, since damage is at the heart of the tort and material damage must be alleged. The claim was dismissed from the County Court as Mr Watkins failed to make representations that he had suffered any injury, loss or damage as a result of the instances of interference with his legal mail.

On 20 July 2004, the case went to appeal before Lord Justices Laws, Brooke and Clarke in the Civil Division of the Court of Appeal where the appeal was unanimously allowed, although the Home Office was given leave to appeal to the House of Lords. A nominal award of £5 in general damages was entered against the three defendants. The court was not convinced by the arguments that suggested the ′floodgates′ would open if the claimant was to seek adequate redress. Lord Justice Brooke stated: "It is now well established that a prisoner does not lose his right of access to a court when he goes through the prison gate." The Court of Appeal felt that the question of an award of exemplary damages should be remitted to Judge Ibbotson at the County Court as they did not have sufficient information to make the determination.

== Judgment ==
In February 2006, the appeal was heard before the Appellate Committee of the House of Lords and the judgment was handed down on 29 March 2006. The question before the House was whether the grounds on which the Court of Appeal had permitted the appeal were correct. The Appeal Court had allowed the appeal on the grounds that the public officer′s interference with the respondent′s right to proper unhampered access to the courts and legal advice had infringed a "constitutional right" and this negated the need to demonstrate actual losses or proof of damage, leading to the tort of misfeasance in public office being actionable.

It was established that Watkins had not suffered any "material damage" and this made his action challenging. Therefore, the House of Lords ruled that the tort of misfeasance in public office was never actionable without proof of material damage. However, Lord Walker of Gestingthorpe was decisive in saying that the deliberate abuse of public office directed at an individual citizen called for an effective sanction which that citizen could on to be enforced as of right: "Exemplary damages, even if anomalous, have a part to play in discouraging abuses of power in a democratic society".

These authorities present a remarkably consistent body of law on the point now at issue. The proving of special damage has either been expressly recognised as an essential ingredient, or it has been assumed. None of these cases (and no authority, judicial or academic, cited to the House) lends support to the proposition that the tort of misfeasance in public office is actionable per se. Ashby v White, as I have suggested, is not reliable authority for that proposition. I would be very reluctant to disturb a rule which has been understood to represent the law for over 300 years, and which has been adopted elsewhere, unless there were compelling grounds for doing so.

— — Lord Bingham of Cornhill

=== Tort of misfeasance in public office ===
In 2003, the House of Lords held in Three Rivers District Council and Others v Governor and Company of the Bank of England (No 3) [2001] UKHL 16 that for the tort of misfeasance in public office to be actionable there had to be the essential ingredient of bad faith.

== See also ==
- R v Secretary of State for the Home Department, ex parte Simms
- E v Secretary of State for the Home Department
