= Berbiguières =

- Commune
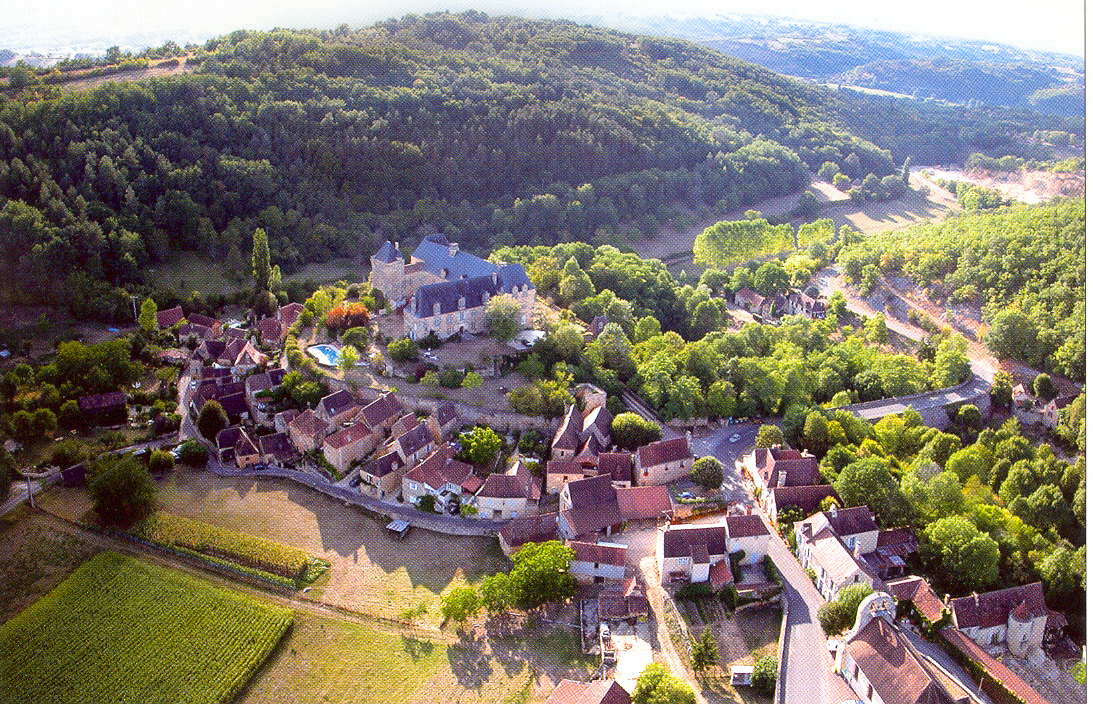
- A general view of Berbiguières

- Coat of arms
- Location of Berbiguières
- Location within France Location within Nouvelle-Aquitaine
- Coordinates: 44°50′08″N 1°02′36″E
- Country: France
- Region: Nouvelle-Aquitaine
- Department: Dordogne
- Arrondissement: Sarlat-la-Canéda
- Canton: Vallée Dordogne
- Intercommunality: Vallée de la Dordogne et Forêt Bessède

Government
  - Mayor (2021–2026): Yves Lombart
- Area^{1}: 5.35 km^{2} (2.07 sq mi)
- Elevation: 100 m (330 ft)
- Highest elevation: 250 m (820 ft)
- Lowest elevation: 55 m (180 ft)
- Population (2023): 177
  - Density: 33.1/km^{2} (85.7/sq mi)
- Time zone: UTC+01:00 (CET)
  - Summer (DST): UTC+02:00 (CEST)
- INSEE/Postal code: 24036 /24220
- ^{1} French Land Register data, which excludes lakes, ponds, glaciers > 1 km^{2} (0.386 sq mi or 247 acres) and river estuaries.

Berbiguières (French pronunciation: [bɛʁbigjɛʁ]; Occitan: Berbiguièras) is a commune in the southwestern French department of Dordogne. In Occitan, the town is called Berbiguièras.

== Population ==
Historical population
Year	Pop.	±% p.a.
1968	159	—
1975	160	+0.09%
1982	173	+1.12%
1990	181	+0.57%
1999	177	−0.25%
2007	177	+0.00%
2012	172	−0.57%
2017	182	+1.14%
2023	177	−0.46%
Source: INSEE

== See also ==
- Communes of the Dordogne department
