= James Holman (judge) =

British judge

Sir Edward James Holman (born 21 August 1947) is a retired British judge of the High Court of England and Wales, assigned to the Family Division. He was the Commodore of the Royal Yacht Squadron from 2021 to 2025.

== Legal career ==
Holman was called to the bar (Middle Temple) in 1971 and was elected a bencher in 1995. He acted for the Queen's Proctor from 1980 to 1991 and legal assessor for the Central Council for Nursing, Midwifery and Health Visiting (now the Nursing and Midwifery Council) from 1983 to 1995. Holman has served as an officer of the Family Law Bar Association, as secretary 1988–92 and chairman 1992–95.

In 1991, he was appointed a Queen's Counsel and a Crown Court Recorder in 1993. He was a member of the Family Proceedings Rules Committee from 1991 and of the Supreme Court (now the Senior Courts) Procedure Committee from 1992, leaving both committees in 1995.

On 18 March 1995, he was appointed a High Court judge, receiving the customary knighthood, and assigned to the Family Division.

He was Family Division Liaison Judge for the Western Circuit from 1995 to 2002.

He retired from the High Court on 27 June 2022.

== Other work ==
Sir James Holman was the Commodore of the Royal Yacht Squadron from 2021 until 2025.

== Family ==
Sir James Holman is the brother of political media personality and author Christine Hamilton.
