= R (Alconbury Developments Ltd) v Secretary of State for the Environment =

R (Alconbury Developments Ltd) v Secretary of State for the Environment, Transport and the Regions
- Court: House of Lords
- Decided: 9 May 2001
- Citation: [2001] UKHL 23

Court membership
- Judges sitting: Lord Slynn of Hadley; Lord Nolan; Lord Hoffmann; Lord Hutton; Lord Clyde

Keywords
- Judicial review; Principle of proportionality; Planning policy; Planning appeals; Human rights; ECHR Art 6(1)

R (Alconbury Developments Ltd) v Secretary of State for the Environment, Transport and the Regions [2001] UKHL 23 is a UK constitutional law case, concerning judicial review.

== Facts ==
Alconbury Developments Ltd and others challenged (1) the Minister's power to determine planning appeals, rather than an inspector, (2) a Minister's power to approve compulsory purchase orders under the Highway Act 1980, and (3) a new rail link approved under the Transport and Works Act 1992.

The claimants argued that (1) the decisions affected their civil rights, (2) under the ECHR art 6(1) those questions should be decided by an independent and impartial tribunal, with court review, not a Minister, (3) there was insufficient judicial control for ECHR art 6(1) because the statutory appeals did not allow for a rehearing on the merits.

== Judgment ==
The House of Lords held that, although civil rights were affected and there should be independent oversight, ECHR art 6(1) did not require a court to rehear the merits of a decision. Statutory appeals to the High Court were sufficient review of legality.

Lord Slynn said proportionality should be recognised as a general principle of English law:

48. The adoption of planning policy and its application to particular facts is quite different from the judicial function. It is for elected Members of Parliament and ministers to decide what are the objectives of planning policy, objectives which may be of national, environmental, social or political significance and for these objectives to be set out in legislation, primary and secondary, in ministerial directions and in planning policy guidelines. Local authorities, inspectors and the Secretary of State are all required to have regard to policy in taking particular planning decisions and it is easy to overstate the difference between the application of a policy in decisions taken by the Secretary of State and his inspector. As to the making of policy, Wade & Forsyth Administrative Law, 8th ed (2000) p 464:
  "It is self-evident that ministerial or departmental policy cannot be regarded as disqualifying bias. One of the commonest administrative mechanisms is to give a minister power to make or confirm an order after hearing objections to it. The procedure for the hearing of objections is subject to the rules of natural justice in so far as they require a fair hearing and fair procedure generally. But the minister's decision cannot be impugned on the ground that he has advocated the scheme or that he is known to support it as a matter of policy. The whole object of putting the power into his hands is that he may exercise it according to government policy."
  As Mr Gregory Jones put it pithily in argument it is not right to say that a policy maker cannot be a decision maker or that the final decision maker cannot be a democratically elected person or body.
49. Accepting this method of proceeding, the question as the European court has shown, is whether there is a sufficient judicial control to ensure a determination by an independent and impartial tribunal subsequently. The judgments to which I have referred do not require that this should constitute a rehearing on an application by an appeal on the merits. It would be surprising if it had required this in view of the difference of function between the minister exercising his statutory powers, for the policy of which he is answerable to the legislature and ultimately to the electorate, and the court. What is required on the part of the latter is that there should be a sufficient review of the legality of the decisions and of the procedures followed. The common law has developed specific grounds of review of administrative acts and these have been reflected in the statutory provisions for judicial review such as are provided for in the present cases. See as relatively straightforward examples: Ashbridge Investments Ltd v Minister of Housing and Local Government [1965] 1 WLR 1320 and Stringer v Minister of Housing and Local Government [1970] 1 WLR 1281.
50. It has long been established that if the Secretary of State misinterprets the legislation under which he purports to act, or if he takes into account matters irrelevant to his decision or refuses or fails to take account of matters relevant to his decision, or reaches a perverse decision, the court may set his decision aside. Even if he fails to follow necessary procedural steps—failing to give notice of a hearing or to allow an opportunity for evidence to be called or cross-examined, or for representations to be made or to take any step which fairness and natural justice requires, the court may interfere. The legality of the decision and the procedural steps must be subject to sufficient judicial control. But none of the judgments before the European Court of Human Rights requires that the court should have "full jurisdiction" to review policy or the overall merits of a planning decision. This approach is reflected in the powers of the European Court of Justice to review executive acts under article 230 of the European Community Treaty.
  "It shall for this purpose have jurisdiction in actions brought by a Member State, the Council or the Commission on grounds of lack of competence, infringement of an essential procedural requirement, infringement of this Treaty or of any rule of law relating to its application, or misuse of powers."
51. The European Court of Justice does of course apply the principle of proportionality when examining such acts and national judges must apply the same principle when dealing with Community law issues. There is a difference between that principle and the approach of the English courts in Associated Provincial Picture Houses Ltd v Wednesbury Corporation [1948] 1 KB 223. But the difference in practice is not as great as is sometimes supposed. The cautious approach of the European Court of Justice in applying the principle is shown inter alia by the margin of appreciation it accords to the institutions of the Community in making economic assessments. I consider that even without reference to the Human Rights Act the time has come to recognise that this principle is part of English administrative law, not only when judges are dealing with Community acts but also when they are dealing with acts subject to domestic law. Trying to keep the Wednesbury principle and proportionality in separate compartments seems to me to be unnecessary and confusing. Reference to the Human Rights Act however makes it necessary that the court should ask whether what is done is compatible with Convention rights. That will often require that the question should be asked whether the principle of proportionality has been satisfied: see R v Secretary of State for the Home Department, Ex p Turgut [2000] Imm LR 306; R v Secretary of State for the Home Department, Ex p Mahmood. The Times, 9 January 2001
52. This principle does not go as far as to provide for a complete rehearing on the merits of the decision. Judicial control does not need to go so far. It should not do so unless Parliament specifically authorises it in particular areas.
53. In R v Criminal Injuries Compensation Board, Ex p A [1999] 2 AC 330, 344 I accepted that the court had jurisdiction to quash for a misunderstanding or ignorance of an established and relevant fact. I remain of that view...

Lord Nolan said this:

60. The first, which reflects the obvious unsuitability of the courts as the arbiters in planning and related matters, is that the decision to be made, as explained by Lord Greene M R in B Johnson & Co (Builders) Ltd v Minister of Health [1947] 2 All ER 395, 399 is an administrative and not a judicial decision. In the relatively small and populous island which we occupy, the decisions made by the Secretary of State will often have acute social, economic and environmental implications. A degree of central control is essential to the orderly use and development of town and country. Parliament has entrusted the requisite degree of control to the Secretary of State, and it is to Parliament which he must account for his exercise of it. To substitute for the Secretary of State an independent and impartial body with no central electoral accountability would not only be a recipe for chaos: it would be profoundly undemocratic.
61. Electoral accountability alone is, of course, plainly insufficient to satisfy the rule of law. Are then the rights of the subject in planning and related matters adequately protected by the statutory provisions for appeal to the courts and by the process of judicial review? It is said that these remedies fail to meet the article 6(1) criterion because they do not permit a review of the decision of the Secretary of State on its merits. If this criticism is limited to the absence of a review of the decision on its planning merits it is indisputable. But a review of the merits of the decision-making process is fundamental to the courts' jurisdiction. The power of review may even extend to a decision on a question of fact. As long ago as 1955 your Lordships' House, in Edwards v Bairstow [1956] AC 14, a case in which an appeal (from general commissioners of income tax) could only be brought on a question of law, upheld the right and duty of the appellate court to reverse a finding of fact which had no justifiable basis.

Lord Hoffmann said the following:

70. There is no conflict between human rights and the democratic principle. Respect for human rights requires that certain basic rights of individuals should not be capable in any circumstances of being overridden by the majority, even if they think that the public interest so requires. Other rights should be capable of being overridden only in very restricted circumstances. These are rights which belong to individuals simply by virtue of their humanity, independently of any utilitarian calculation. The protection of these basic rights from majority decision requires that independent and impartial tribunals should have the power to decide whether legislation infringes them and either (as in the United States) to declare such legislation invalid or (as in the United Kingdom) to declare that it is incompatible with the governing human rights instrument. But outside these basic rights, there are many decisions which have to be made every day (for example, about the allocation of resources) in which the only fair method of decision is by some person or body accountable to the electorate.

Lord Clyde said this:

139. We are concerned with an administrative process and an administrative decision. Planning is a matter for the formation and application of policy. The policy is not a matter for the courts but for the executive.

== See also ==
- United Kingdom constitutional law
