= R v Secretary of State for the Home Department, ex parte Simms =

UK constitutional law case concerning parliamentary sovereignty

- Court: House of Lords
- Citations: [1999] UKHL 33, [2000] 2 AC 115

Court membership
- Judges sitting: Lord Browne–Wilkinson; Lord Steyn; Lord Hoffmann; Lord Hobhouse of Wood–borough; Lord Millett

Keywords
- Parliamentary sovereignty; Ultra vires order; Prisoners′ rights; Constitutional principle

R v Secretary of State for the Home Department, ex parte Simms [1999] UKHL 33 is a UK constitutional law case, concerning parliamentary sovereignty.

== Facts ==
Simms and another prisoner, both serving life sentences for murder, brought judicial review proceedings against the Home Secretary’s contention that they could not have oral interviews with journalists unless no part would be published. Under the Prison Act 1952 section 47(1) the Home Secretary had passed Prison Service Standing Order 5, paragraph 37-A which restricted oral interviews with journalists. The prisoners contended this impinged upon the right of journalists to free speech under the European Convention on Human Rights article 10, because practically the opportunity for any investigation into their convictions would be inhibited by not allowing them to speak. The prisoners could, however, engage in written correspondence.

Latham J held that the prisoners should be able to do oral interviews. The Court of Appeal held the prisoners could not do oral interviews.

== Judgment ==
The House of Lords allowed the appeal. Lord Steyn gave the leading judgment.

Lord Hoffmann agreed with Lord Steyn and said the following. (Note: [2000] 2 AC 115, 131)

Parliamentary sovereignty means that Parliament can, if it chooses, legislate contrary to fundamental principles of human rights.

...

The constraints upon its exercise by Parliament are ultimately political, not legal. But the principle of legality means that Parliament must squarely confront what it is doing and accept the political cost. Fundamental rights cannot be overridden by general or ambiguous words. This is because there is too great a risk that the full implications of their unqualified meaning may have passed unnoticed in the democratic process. In the absence of express language or necessary implication to the contrary, the courts therefore presume that even the most general words were intended to be subject to the basic rights of the individual. In this way the courts of the United Kingdom, though acknowledging the sovereignty of Parliament, apply principles of constitutionality little different from those which exist in countries where the power of the legislature is expressly limited by a constitutional document.

Lord Hobhouse gave a concurring opinion. Lord Browne-Wilkinson agreed with Lord Steyn. Lord Millett agreed with Lord Steyn and Lord Hobhouse.

== See also ==
- United Kingdom constitutional law
- Watkins v Home Office and others
