= Lord Malcolm =

Lord Malcolm may refer to:

- John Malcolm, 1st Baron Malcolm (1833-1902), Scottish soldier and politician.
- Colin Campbell, Lord Malcolm (b. 1953), Scottish lawyer and Senator of the College of Justice.
