= List of current members of the British Privy Council =

This is a list of the members of the Privy Council of the United Kingdom, along with the roles they fulfil and the date when they were sworn of the council. As of November 2026, there are 738 members on the council. The prefix The Rt Hon. is omitted here, because every counsellor bears it, as is the postnominal PC, as every counsellor who is also a peer uses it.

The council is composed mostly of politicians (both members of the UK government and parliament, and members of the devolved governments and legislatures) and civil servants, both serving and retired (since membership is for life). Among those politicians generally sworn of the council are ministers of the Crown, the few most senior figures of the Loyal Opposition, the UK parliamentary leader of the third-largest party, the first ministers of the devolved governments (including, in the case of Northern Ireland, the deputy first minister), and the speakers or presiding officers of the UK parliament and the devolved legislatures. Besides these, the council includes a few members of the Royal family (usually the consort and heir apparent only), more than two hundred senior UK judges (the Supreme Court justices, the senior judges of England and Wales, as well as the senators of the College of Justice of the Inner House and Lord Advocate in Scotland) and a few clergy (the three most senior Church of England bishops, namely the Archbishop of Canterbury, the Archbishop of York and the Bishop of London).

== Summary table ==
Category	Category Total	Type	Type Total
Non-partisan	237	Royal Family/Household	10
Non-partisan	237	Civil Service	5
Non-partisan	237	Clergy	8
Non-partisan	237	HM judiciary	206
Non-partisan	237	Commonwealth judiciary	8
Partisan	501	Conservative politician	235
Partisan	501	Labour politician	160
Partisan	501	Lib. Dem. politician	30
Partisan	501	Commonwealth politician	23
Partisan	501	Other politician	53

== List of counsellors ==
Type	Name	Start (Note: Members may be appointed "by order" or "by command". In the former case, two orders are recorded: one for the appointment and one reflecting the person has taken the oath (or affirmation). Members appointed by command are appointed at the meetings at which they are sworn, generating an order only for the oath. Where there is one date listed noted with "App.", the person has been appointed by order but not sworn. Where only one date is shown (from October 2000) forward it means the person was appointed by command. Full dates before October 2000 are gleaned from Leigh Rayment's list of Privy Counsellors 1969–present, and bare years from the Privy Council's list of current members. It is not clear whether these are dates of appointment or oath.)	Position(s)
Labour politician	Diane Abbott	15 February 2017	Shadow Home Secretary (2016–2020)
HM judiciary	John Cameron, Lord Abernethy	22 March 2005	Senator of the College of Justice, Inner House (2005–2007)
Conservative politician	Nigel Adams	29 September 2021; 15 December 2021	Minister of State at the Cabinet Office (2021–2022)
Labour politician	Andrew Adonis, Baron Adonis	10 June 2009	Secretary of State for Transport (2009–2010)
HM judiciary	Richard Aikens	10 December 2008; 18 March 2009	Lord Justice of Appeal (2008–2015)
Labour politician	Bob Ainsworth	22 March 2005	Government Deputy Chief Whip in the Commons and Treasurer of the Household (2003–2007); Minister of State for the Armed Forces (2007–2009); Secretary of State for Defence (2009–2010)
Royal Family/ Household	Clive Alderton	13 September 2022	Private Secretary to the Sovereign (2022–present)
Lib. Dem. politician	Danny Alexander	13 May 2010	Secretary of State for Scotland (2010); Chief Secretary to the Treasury (2010–2015)
Labour politician	Douglas Alexander	10 May 2005; 7 June 2005	Minister of State for Europe (2005–2006); Secretary of State for Scotland and Secretary of State for Transport (2006–2007); Secretary of State for International Development (2007–2010); Shadow Foreign Secretary (2011–2015); Minister of State for Trade Policy and Economic Security (2024–2025); Secretary of State for Scotland (2025–present)
Labour politician	Heidi Alexander	4 December 2024	Transport Secretary (2024–present)
Labour politician	Valerie Amos, Baroness Amos	13 May 2003	Leader of the House of Lords and Lord President of the Council (2003–2007); High Commissioner to Australia (2009–2010); United Nations Under-Secretary-General for Humanitarian Affairs and Emergency Relief Coordinator (2010–2015)
Labour politician	Donald Anderson, Baron Anderson of Swansea	30 November 2000; 14 February 2001	Long-serving MP (1966–1970 and 1974–2005)
Conservative politician	Stuart Andrew	10 March 2021; 26 May 2021	Government Deputy Chief Whip in the Commons and Treasurer of the Household (2020–2022); Minister of State for Housing (2022); Minister of State for Prisons and Probation (2022); Parliamentary Under-Secretary of State for Sport, Tourism and Civil Society (2022–2024); Parliamentary Under-Secretary of State for Equalities (2022–2024); Chief Whip of the Conservative Party (2024); Shadow Secretary of State for Culture, Media and Sport (2024–2025); Shadow Secretary of State for Health and Social Care (2025–2026)
HM judiciary	Geraldine Andrews	11 November 2020; 26 May 2021	Lady Justice of Appeal (2020–present)
Conservative politician	Joyce Anelay, Baroness Anelay of St Johns	8 July 2009; 15 October 2009	Opposition Chief Whip in the Lords (2007–2010); Government Chief Whip in the Lords and Captain of the Gentlemen-at-Arms (2010–2014); Minister of State for Foreign and Commonwealth Affairs (2014–2017); Minister for Exiting the European Union (2017)
HM judiciary	Elish Angiolini	14 November 2006	Lord Advocate (2006–2011); Lord Clerk Register (2023–present)
Other politician	Rhun ap Iorwerth	8 July 2026	First Minister of Wales (2026–present)
Conservative politician	James Arbuthnot, Baron Arbuthnot of Edrom	11 February 1998	Minister for Defence Procurement (1995–1997); Opposition Chief Whip in the Commons (1997–2001); Shadow Secretary of State for Trade and Industry and for Work and Pensions (2003–2005); Chair of the House of Commons Defence Select Committee (2005–2014)
HM judiciary	Mary Arden, Lady Arden of Heswall	15 November 2000; 14 February 2001	Lady Justice of Appeal (2000–2018); Justice of the Supreme Court of the United Kingdom (2018–2022)
Conservative politician	Edward Argar	13 September 2022; 12 October 2022	Minister for the Cabinet Office and Paymaster General (2022); Chief Secretary to the Treasury (2022); Minister of State for Victims and Sentencing (2022–2023); Minister of State for Prisons, Parole and Probation (2023–2024); Shadow Secretary of State for Justice (2024); Shadow Secretary of State for Health and Social Care (2024–2025)
HM judiciary	Iain Armstrong, Lord Armstrong	10 April 2024	Senator of the College of Justice, Inner House (2023–present)
Labour politician	Hilary Armstrong, Baroness Armstrong of Hill Top	10 March 1999	Minister of State for Local Government and Housing (1997–2001); Government Chief Whip in the Commons and Parliamentary Secretary to the Treasury (2001–2006); Chancellor of the Duchy of Lancaster, Minister for the Cabinet Office and Minister for Social Exclusion (2006–2007)
HM judiciary	Richard Arnold	17 December 2019; 12 February 2020	Lord Justice of Appeal (2019–present)
HM judiciary	Paul Arthurson, Lord Arthurson	3 June 2026	Senator of the College of Justice, Inner House (2026–present)
Conservative politician	Michael Ashcroft, Baron Ashcroft	10 September 2012; 7 November 2012	Deputy Chair of the Conservative Party (2005–2010)
Conservative politician	Henry Ashton, 4th Baron Ashton of Hyde	28 August 2019; 6 November 2019	Government Chief Whip in the Lords and Captain of the Gentlemen-at-Arms (2019–2022)
Labour politician	Catherine Ashton, Baroness Ashton of Upholland	24 May 2006	Parliamentary Under-Secretary in the Department for Constitutional Affairs (2004–2007); Parliamentary Under-Secretary at the Ministry of Justice (2007); Leader of the House of Lords and Lord President of the Council (2007–2008); European Commissioner for Trade (2008–2009); High Representative of the Union for Foreign Affairs and Security Policy (2009–2014); First Vice President of the European Commission (2010–2014)
Labour politician	Jonathan Ashworth	10 March 2021; 26 May 2021	Shadow Secretary of State for Health and Social Care (2018–2021); Shadow Secretary of State for Work and Pensions (2021–2023); Shadow Paymaster General (2023–2024)
HM judiciary	Sarah Asplin	15 November 2017; 8 February 2018	Lady Justice of Appeal (2017–present)
Conservative politician	John Astor, 3rd Baron Astor of Hever (Note: Sworn as Privy Counsellor on leaving government)	14 May 2015	Parliamentary Under-Secretary of State at Ministry of Defence (2010–2015)
Conservative politician	Robert Atkins	28 June 1995	Minister of State for the Environment and the Countryside (1994–1995)
Conservative politician	Victoria Atkins	15 November 2023	Secretary of State for Health and Social Care (2023–2024); Shadow Secretary of State for Health and Social Care (2024); Shadow Secretary of State for Environment, Food and Rural Affairs (2024–present)
HM judiciary	Robin Auld	8 February 1995	Lord Justice of Appeal (1995–2007); Senior Presiding Judge for England and Wales (1995–1998)
Conservative politician	Kemi Badenoch	13 September 2022	Secretary of State for International Trade (2022–2023); President of the Board of Trade (2022–2024); Minister for Women and Equalities (2022–2024); Secretary of State for Business and Trade (2023–2024); Shadow Secretary of State for Housing, Communities and Local Government (2024); Leader of the Opposition (2024–present)
HM judiciary	Dorothy Bain	10 November 2021; 15 December 2021	Lord Advocate (2021–2026)
HM judiciary	Jeremy Baker	6 November 2024	Lord Justice of Appeal (2024–present)
HM judiciary	Jonathan Baker	7 November 2018	Lord Justice of Appeal (2018–present)
Conservative politician	Kenneth Baker, Baron Baker of Dorking	8 February 1984	Minister of State for Industry and Information Technology (1981–1984); Minister of State for Local Government (1984–1985); Secretary of State for the Environment (1985–1986); Secretary of State for Education and Science (1986–1989); Chair of the Conservative Party and Chancellor of the Duchy of Lancaster (1989–1990); Home Secretary (1990–1992)
Lib. Dem. politician	Norman Baker	16 July 2014	Minister of State for Crime Prevention (2013–2014)
HM judiciary	Scott Baker	5 November 2002; 20 November 2002	Lord Justice of Appeal (2002–2010)
Conservative politician	Steve Baker	15 November 2023	Minister of State for Northern Ireland (2022–2024); Minister of State at the Cabinet Office (2024)
Conservative politician	Tony Baldry	11 December 2013; 11 February 2014	Long-serving MP (1983–2015); Second Church Estates Commissioner (2010–2015)
Labour politician	Ed Balls	28 June 2007	Secretary of State for Children, Schools and Families (2007–2010); Shadow Home Secretary (2010–2011); Shadow Chancellor of the Exchequer (2011–2015)
Conservative politician	Steve Barclay	20 November 2018	Secretary of State for Exiting the European Union (2018–2020); Chief Secretary to the Treasury (2020–2021); Chancellor of the Duchy of Lancaster and Minister for the Cabinet Office (2021–2022); Secretary of State for Health and Social Care (2022, 2022–2023); Secretary of State for Environment, Food and Rural Affairs (2023–2024); Shadow Secretary of State for Environment, Food and Rural Affairs (2024)
Conservative politician	Greg Barker, Baron Barker of Battle	10 September 2012; 17 October 2012	Minister of State for Climate Change (2010–2014)
Labour politician	Kevin Barron	19 September 2001; 31 October 2001	Member of the Intelligence and Security Committee (1997–2005); Lord Commissioner (2006–2007); Minister of State for Apprenticeships and Consumer Affairs (2009–2010); Chair of the House of Commons Select Committee on Standards (2010–2018)
Commonwealth politician	Dean Barrow	15 March 2016 (app.)	Prime Minister of Belize (2008–2020)
Conservative politician	Gavin Barwell, Baron Barwell	3 May 2017; 14 June 2017	Minister of State for Housing (2016–2017); Downing Street Chief of Staff (2017–2019)
Labour politician	Steve Bassam, Baron Bassam of Brighton	8 July 2009	Government Chief Whip in the Lords and Captain of the Gentlemen-at-Arms (2008–2010); Opposition Chief Whip in the Lords (2010–2018)
Conservative politician	Michael Bates, Baron Bates	14 May 2015	Minister of State at the Home Office (2015–2016); Minister of State at the Department for International Development (2016–2019)
Labour politician	John Battle	22 October 2002; 20 November 2002	Member of the International Development Committee (2001–2010)
Labour politician	Kevan Jones, Baron Beamish	24 April 2018; 23 May 2018	Long-serving MP (2001–2024); Parliamentary Under-Secretary of State for Veterans (2008–2010); Shadow Minister for the Armed Forces (2010–2016); Chair of the Intelligence and Security Committee (2024–present)
HM judiciary	David Bean	10 December 2014; 19 March 2015	Lord Justice of Appeal (2014–present)
HM judiciary	Jack Beatson	12 February 2013; 15 May 2013	Lord Justice of Appeal (2013–2018)
HM judiciary	John Beckett, Lord Beckett	10 April 2024; 22 May 2024	Senator of the College of Justice, Inner House (2023–2025); Lord Justice Clerk (2025–present)
Labour politician	Margaret Beckett, Baroness Beckett	10 March 1993; 29 July 1998	Deputy Leader of the Opposition (1992–1994); Leader of the Opposition (1994); Shadow Secretary of State for Health (1994–1995); Shadow Secretary of State for Trade and Industry (1995–1997); Secretary of State for Trade and Industry (1997–1998); Leader of the House of Commons and Lord President of the Council (1998–2001); Secretary of State for Environment, Food and Rural Affairs (2001–2006); Foreign Secretary (2006–2007); Chair of the Intelligence and Security Committee (2008); Minister of State for Housing and Planning (2008–2009); Chair of the National Security Strategy Joint Select Committee (2010–2019)
Lib. Dem. politician	Alan Beith, Baron Beith	15 July 1992	Deputy Leader of the Liberal Democrats (1992–2003); Liberal Democrat Spokesman for Home Affairs (1994–1999); Liberal Democrat Shadow Leader of the House of Commons (1999–2003); Chair of the Commons Justice Select Committee (2007–2015)
Labour politician	Hilary Benn	8 October 2003; 14 October 2003	Secretary of State for International Development (2003–2007); Secretary of State for Environment, Food and Rural Affairs (2007–2010); Shadow Leader of the House of Commons (2010–2011); Shadow Secretary of State for Communities and Local Government (2011–2015); Shadow Foreign Secretary (2015–2016); Chair of the Committee on the Future Relationship with the European Union (2016–2021); Shadow Secretary of State for Northern Ireland (2023–2024); Secretary of State for Northern Ireland (2024–2026)
Royal Family/ Household	Richard Benyon, Baron Benyon	15 February 2017	MP for Newbury (2005–2019); Minister for Rural Affairs (2021–2022); Minister of State for International Environment (2022); Minister of State for Biosecurity, Marine and Rural Affairs (2022–2023); Minister of State for Climate, Environment and Energy (2023–2024); Lord Chamberlain of the Household (2024–present)
Other politician	John Bercow	8 July 2009	Speaker of the House of Commons (2009–2019)
Other politician	Jake Berry	25 July 2019; 8 October 2019	Minister of State for the Northern Powerhouse and Local Growth (2017–2020); Minister without Portfolio and Chair of the Conservative Party (2022)
HM judiciary	Colin Birss	28 April 2021; 29 September 2021	Lord Justice of Appeal (2021–2025); Chancellor of the High Court/President of the Business and Property Division (2025–2026); Master of the Rolls (2026–present)
HM judiciary	Jill Black, Lady Black of Derwent	16 March 2011; 10 May 2011	Lady Justice of Appeal (2010–2017); Justice of the Supreme Court of the United Kingdom (2017–2021)
Other politician	Ian Blackford	19 July 2017; 11 October 2017	Leader of the SNP group in the House of Commons (2017–2022)
Labour politician	Tessa Blackstone, Baroness Blackstone	7 February 2001; 14 March 2001	Minister for the Arts (2001–2003)
Labour politician	Tony Blair	27 July 1994	Leader of the Opposition (1994–1997); Prime Minister of the United Kingdom (1997–2007); Special Envoy of the Quartet on the Middle East (2007–2015)
Commonwealth judiciary	Peter Blanchard	21 May 1998; 17 May 2000	Judge of the Court of Appeal of New Zealand (1996–2004); Justice of the Supreme Court of New Zealand (2004–2012)
Labour politician	Hazel Blears	10 May 2005; 7 June 2005	Minister of State at the Home Office (2003–2006); Chair of the Labour Party and Minister without Portfolio (2006–2007); Secretary of State for Communities and Local Government (2007–2009)
Conservative politician	David Maclean, Baron Blencathra	28 June 1995	Minister of State for the Home Office (1993–1997); Opposition Chief Whip in the Commons (2001–2005); Shadow Minister for Environment, Food and Rural Affairs (2024–present)
Labour politician	David Blunkett, Baron Blunkett	1997	Secretary of State for Education and Employment (1997–2001); Home Secretary (2001–2004); Secretary of State for Work and Pensions (2005)
Labour politician	Paul Boateng, Baron Boateng	30 July 1999	Minister of State for Home Affairs (1998–2001); Financial Secretary to the Treasury (2001–2002); Chief Secretary to the Treasury (2002–2005); High Commissioner to South Africa (2005–2009)
HM judiciary	Iain Bonomy, Lord Bonomy	13 October 2010; 9 February 2011	Senator of the College of Justice, Inner House (2010–2012)
Conservative politician	Virginia Bottomley, Baroness Bottomley of Nettlestone	13 April 1992	Secretary of State for Health (1992–1995); Secretary of State for National Heritage (1995–1997)
HM judiciary	Colin Boyd, Baron Boyd of Duncansby	19 April 2000; 17 May 2000	Solicitor General for Scotland (1997–2000); Lord Advocate (2000–2006); Senator of the College of Justice, Inner House (2012–2024)
Conservative politician	Ivon Moore-Brabazon, 3rd Baron Brabazon of Tara	9 January 2013; 13 March 2013	Chair of Committees (2002–2012)
HM judiciary	Alastair Campbell, Lord Bracadale	9 April 2013; 15 May 2013	Senator of the College of Justice, Inner House (2013–2017)
Conservative politician	Karen Bradley	15 July 2016	Secretary of State for Culture, Media and Sport (2016–2018); Secretary of State for Northern Ireland (2018–2019)
Labour politician	Keith Bradley, Baron Bradley	7 February 2001; 14 March 2001	Treasurer of the Household and Government Deputy Chief Whip in the Commons (1998–2001); Minister of State for Criminal Justice, Sentencing, and Law Reform (2001–2002)
Labour politician	Ben Bradshaw	10 June 2009	Minister of State for Health (2007–2009); Secretary of State for Culture, Media and Sport (2009–2010); Shadow Secretary of State for Digital, Culture, Media and Sport (2010)
Conservative politician	Graham Brady, Baron Brady of Altrincham	15 November 2023	Chair of the 1922 Committee (2010–2024)
HM judiciary	Peter Braid, Lord Braid	8 July 2026	Senator of the College of Justice, Inner House (2026–present)
Lib. Dem. politician	Tom Brake	13 July 2011	Deputy Leader of the House of Commons (2012–2015); Foreign Affairs Spokesperson for the Liberal Democrats (2016–2017); Liberal Democrats Shadow First Secretary of State and spokesperson for Exiting the European Union (2017–2019)
Other politician	Suella Braverman	19 February 2020	Attorney General for England and Wales (2020–2022); Home Secretary (2022, 2022–2023)
HM judiciary	Michael Briggs, Lord Briggs of Westbourne	15 May 2013; 13 June 2013	Lord Justice of Appeal (2013–2017); Justice of the Supreme Court of the United Kingdom (2017–present)
HM judiciary	Philip Brodie, Lord Brodie	12 February 2013; 9 October 2013	Senator of the College of Justice, Inner House (2012–2020)
Labour politician	Gordon Brown	26 June 1996; 23 July 1996	Shadow Chancellor of the Exchequer (1992–1997); Chancellor of the Exchequer (1997–2007); Prime Minister of the United Kingdom (2007–2010); UK Special Envoy on Global Finance and Cooperation (2026–present)
Other politician	Nick Brown	1997; 29 July 1998	Government Chief Whip in the Commons and Parliamentary Secretary to the Treasury (1997–1998 and 2008–2010); Minister of Agriculture, Fisheries and Food (1998–2001); Minister of Work (2001–2003); Treasurer of the Household, Government Deputy Chief Whip in the Commons and Minister for the North East (2007–2008); Opposition Chief Whip in the House of Commons (2016–2021)
Labour politician	Des Browne, Baron Browne of Ladyton	7 May 2005; 10 May 2005	Chief Secretary to the Treasury (2005–2006); Secretary of State for Defence (2006–2008); Secretary of State for Scotland (2007–2008)
Lib. Dem. politician	Malcolm Bruce, Baron Bruce of Bennachie	19 July 2006	Leader of the Scottish Liberal Democrats (1988–1992); Chair of the International Development Committee (2005–2015); Deputy Leader of the Liberal Democrats (2014–2015); Liberal Democrat Scotland spokesperson in the Lords (2024–present)
Labour politician	Chris Bryant	21 July 2026	Secretary of State for Northern Ireland (2026–present)
Conservative politician	Robert Buckland	25 July 2019	Lord Chancellor and Secretary of State for Justice (2019–2021); Secretary of State for Wales (2022); Third Church Estates Commissioner (2025–present)
HM judiciary	Ian Burnett, Baron Burnett of Maldon	10 December 2014; 19 March 2015	Lord Justice of Appeal (2014–2017); Lord Chief Justice of England and Wales (2017–2023)
Labour politician	Andy Burnham	28 June 2007	Chief Secretary to the Treasury (2007–2008); Secretary of State for Culture, Media and Sport (2008–2009); Secretary of State for Health (2009–2010); Shadow Secretary of State for Education (2010–2011); Shadow Secretary of State for Health (2011–2015); Shadow Home Secretary (2015–2016); Mayor of Greater Manchester (2017–2026); Prime Minister of the United Kingdom (2026–present)
Conservative politician	Conor Burns	8 October 2019; 6 November 2019	Minister of State for Trade Policy (2019–2020 and 2022); Minister of State for Northern Ireland (2021–2022)
Conservative politician	Simon Burns	9 February 2011; 16 March 2011	Minister of State for Health Services (2010–2012); Minister of State for Transport (2012–2013)
HM judiciary	Stanley Burnton	11 June 2008	Lord Justice of Appeal (2008–2012)
HM judiciary	Andrew Burrows, Lord Burrows	12 February 2020; 11 March 2020	Justice of the Supreme Court of the United Kingdom (2020–present)
Lib. Dem. politician	Paul Burstow	10 September 2012; 7 November 2012	Minister of State for Care Services (2010–2012)
Conservative politician	Alistair Burt	6 November 2013	Parliamentary Under Secretary of State for Foreign and Commonwealth Affairs (2010–2013); Minister of State for Care and Support (2015–2016); Minister at the Department for International Development (2017–2019); Minister at the Foreign and Commonwealth Office (2017–2019); UK Envoy for Complex Consular Detentions (2026–present)
Civil Service	Robin Butler, Baron Butler of Brockwell	11 February 2004	Chair of the Butler Review Committee (2004)
HM judiciary	Elizabeth Butler-Sloss, Baroness Butler-Sloss	17 February 1988	Lord Justice of Appeal (1988–1999); President of the Family Division of the High Court of Justice (1999–2005); Deputy Coroner of the Queen's Household (2006–2007)
HM judiciary	Richard Buxton	30 October 1997; 26 November 1997	Lord Justice of Appeal (1997–2008)
Labour politician	Stephen Byers	29 July 1998	Chief Secretary to the Treasury (1998); Secretary of State for Trade and Industry (1998–2001); Secretary of State for Transport, Local Government and the Regions (2001–2002)
Labour politician	Liam Byrne	9 October 2008	Minister for the Cabinet Office and Chancellor of the Duchy of Lancaster (2008–2009); Chief Secretary to the Treasury (2009–2010); Shadow Minister for the Cabinet Office (2010–2011); Shadow Secretary of State for Work and Pensions (2011–2013); Shadow Minister for Digital Economy (2017–2020)
Commonwealth judiciary	Dennis Byron	27 July 2004; 9 February 2005	Chief Justice of the Eastern Caribbean Supreme Court (1996–2004); President of the Caribbean Court of Justice (2011–2018)
Lib. Dem. politician	Vince Cable	13 May 2010	Secretary of State for Business, Innovation and Skills (2010–2015); Leader of the Liberal Democrats (2017–2019)
Labour politician	Richard Caborn	10 March 1999	Minister of State at the Department of Trade and Industry (1999–2001); Minister for Sport (2001–2007)
Conservative politician	Alun Cairns	22 March 2016	Secretary of State for Wales (2016–2019)
Conservative politician	Malcolm Sinclair, 20th Earl of Caithness	1990	Paymaster General (1989–1990); Minister of State at the Foreign Office (1990–1992); Minister of State at the Department of Transport (1992–1994)
Conservative politician	David Cameron, Baron Cameron of Chipping Norton	14 December 2005; 8 March 2006	Leader of the Opposition (2005–2010); Prime Minister of the United Kingdom (2010–2016); Foreign Secretary (2023–2024)
Royal Family/ Household	Queen Camilla	9 June 2016	Consort to the Prince of Wales (2005–2022); Queen consort (2022–present)
Labour politician	Alan Campbell	5 March 2014	Lord Commissioner of the Treasury (2006–2008); Deputy Labour Chief Whip in the House of Commons (2010–2021); Labour Chief Whip in the House of Commons (2021–2025); Parliamentary Secretary to the Treasury (2024–2025); Lord President of the Council and Leader of the House of Commons (2025–present)
HM judiciary	Anthony Campbell	10 February 1999	Lord Justice of Appeal, Northern Ireland (1998–2008)
Clergy	George Carey, Baron Carey of Clifton	1991	Archbishop of Canterbury (1991–2002)
HM judiciary	Colin Sutherland, Lord Carloway	9 October 2008	Senator of the College of Justice, Inner House (2008–2012); Lord Justice Clerk (2012–2015); Lord President of the Court of Session and Lord Justice General (2015–2025)
HM judiciary	Ailsa Carmichael, Lady Carmichael	11 June 2025	Senator of the College of Justice, Inner House (2025–present)
Lib. Dem. politician	Alistair Carmichael	15 December 2010; 9 February 2011	Government Deputy Chief Whip in the House of Commons (2010–2013); Secretary of State for Scotland (2013–2015); Liberal Democrat Home Affairs spokesman (2015–2016, 2020–2024); Chief Whip of the Liberal Democrats (2017–2020); Liberal Democrat Spokesman for Northern Ireland (2017–2024); Liberal Democrat Spokesman for Foreign and Commonwealth Affairs (2020); Liberal Democrat Spokesman for Justice (2022–2024); Chair of the Environment, Food and Rural Affairs Select Committee (2024–present)
HM judiciary	Robert Carnwath, Lord Carnwath of Notting Hill	12 February 2002; 22 May 2002	Lord Justice of Appeal (2002–2012); Senior President of Tribunals (2007–2012); Justice of the Supreme Court of the United Kingdom (2012–2020)
HM judiciary	Sue Carr, Baroness Carr of Walton-on-the-Hill	23 June 2020; 28 April 2021	Lady Justice of Appeal (2020–2023); Lady Chief Justice of England and Wales (2023–present)
Civil Service	Simon Case, Baron Case	13 September 2022; 12 October 2022	Cabinet Secretary and Head of the Home Civil Service (2020–2024)
HM judiciary	John Chadwick	30 October 1997	Lord Justice of Appeal (1997–2007)
Labour politician	Shami Chakrabarti, Baroness Chakrabarti	23 May 2018; 27 June 2018	Shadow Attorney General for England and Wales (2016–2020)
Conservative politician	Alex Chalk	26 April 2023	Lord Chancellor and Secretary of State for Justice (2023–2024)
Conservative politician	Lynda Chalker, Baroness Chalker of Wallasey	1987	Minister for Europe (1986–1989); Minister of State for Overseas Development in the Foreign Office (1989–1997)
Labour politician	Jenny Chapman, Baroness Chapman of Darlington	6 May 2025	Minister of State for International Development, Latin America and Caribbean (2025–2026)
HM judiciary	Ruth Charteris	14 October 2026	Lord Advocate (2026–present)
Clergy	Richard Chartres, Baron Chartres	13 December 1995; 14 February 1996	Bishop of London (1995–2017)
Commonwealth politician	Perry Christie	10 March 2004 (app.)	Prime Minister of the Bahamas (2002–2007 and 2012–2017)
HM judiciary	Alistair Clark, Lord Clark	6 November 2024	Senator of the College of Justice, Inner House (2024–present)
Labour politician	David Clark, Baron Clark of Windermere	1997	Minister for the Cabinet Office and Chancellor of the Duchy of Lancaster (1997–1998)
Conservative politician	Greg Clark	9 June 2010	Minister of State at the Department for Communities and Local Government (2010–2012); Financial Secretary to the Treasury (2012–2013); Minister of State for Cities and Constitution (2013–2014); Minister for Universities, Science and Cities (2014–2015); Secretary of State for Communities and Local Government (2015–2016); Secretary of State for Business, Energy and Industrial Strategy (2016–2019); Secretary of State for Levelling Up, Housing and Communities (2022)
Commonwealth politician	Helen Clark	9 February 1990	Deputy Prime Minister of New Zealand (1989–1990); Deputy Leader of the Opposition (1990–1993); Leader of the Opposition (1993–1999); Prime Minister of New Zealand (1999–2008)
HM judiciary	Lynda Clark, Baroness Clark of Calton	6 November 2013; 11 February 2014	Senator of the College of Justice, Inner House (2013–2019)
Labour politician	Charles Clarke	18 July 2001	Minister without Portfolio and Chair of the Labour Party (2001–2002); Secretary of State for Education and Skills (2002–2004); Home Secretary (2004–2006)
HM judiciary	Christopher Clarke	6 November 2013; 11 February 2014	Lord Justice of Appeal (2013–2017)
Conservative politician	Kenneth Clarke, Baron Clarke of Nottingham	1984	Minister for Health (1982–1985); Paymaster General and Minister for Employment (1985–1987); Chancellor of the Duchy of Lancaster and Minister at the DTI (1987–1988); Secretary of State for Health (1988–1990); Secretary of State for Education and Science (1990–1992); Home Secretary (1992–1993); Chancellor of the Exchequer (1993–1997); Shadow Secretary of State for Business, Enterprise and Regulatory Reform (2009–2010); Lord Chancellor and Secretary of State for Justice (2010–2012); Minister without portfolio (2012–2014); Father of the House of Commons (2017–2019)
HM judiciary	Matthew Clarke, Lord Clarke	9 October 2008; 11 February 2009	Senator of the College of Justice, Inner House (2008–2016)
Conservative politician	Simon Clarke	20 September 2021; 15 December 2021	Chief Secretary to the Treasury (2021–2022); Secretary of State for Levelling Up, Housing and Communities (2022)
Labour politician	Tom Clarke	20 May 1997	Minister for Film and Tourism (1997–1998)
Lib. Dem. politician	Nick Clegg	30 January 2008; 12 March 2008	Leader of the Liberal Democrats (2007–2015); Deputy Prime Minister and Lord President of the Council (2010–2015)
Conservative politician	James Cleverly	28 August 2019; 8 October 2019	Chair of the Conservative Party and Minister without portfolio (2019–2020); Minister for International Development (2020); Minister of State for Middle East and North Africa (2020–2022); Minister of State for Europe and North America (2022); Secretary of State for Education (2022); Foreign Secretary (2022–2023); Home Secretary (2023–2024); Shadow Home Secretary (2024); Shadow Secretary of State for Housing, Communities and Local Government (2025–2026)
HM judiciary	Stephen Cobb	12 November 2025	Lord Justice of Appeal (2025–2026); President of the Family Division (2026–present)
HM judiciary	Sara Cockerill	10 March 2026	Lord Justice of Appeal (2025–present)
Conservative politician	Thérèse Coffey, Baroness Coffey	8 October 2019	Secretary of State for Work and Pensions (2019–2022); Deputy Prime Minister and Secretary of State for Health and Social Care (2022); Secretary of State for Environment, Food and Rural Affairs (2022–2023)
HM judiciary	Patrick Coghlin	11 February 2009; 18 March 2009	Lord Justice of Appeal, Northern Ireland (2008–2015)
HM judiciary	Lawrence Collins, Baron Collins of Mapesbury	7 February 2007; 21 March 2007	Lord Justice of Appeal (2007–2009); Lord of Appeal in Ordinary (2009); Justice of the Supreme Court of the United Kingdom (2009–2011)
HM judiciary	Adrian Colton	10 December 2025	Lord Justice of Appeal, Northern Ireland (2025–present)
Labour politician	Yvette Cooper	10 October 2007; 14 November 2007	Minister for Housing and Planning (2007–2008); Chief Secretary to the Treasury (2008–2009); Secretary of State for Work and Pensions (2009–2010); Shadow Foreign Secretary (2010–2011); Shadow Home Secretary (2011–2015 and 2021–2024); Chair of the Home Affairs Select Committee (2016–2021); Home Secretary (2024–2025); Foreign Secretary (2025–2026); Secretary of State for Health and Social Care (2026-present)
Conservative politician	John Cope, Baron Cope of Berkeley	1988	Treasurer of the Household and Government Deputy Chief Whip in the Commons (1983–1987); Paymaster General (1992–1994); Opposition Chief Whip in the Lords (2001–2007)
Other politician	Jeremy Corbyn	11 November 2015	Leader of the Opposition, Leader of the Labour Party (2015–2020); Parliamentary Leader of Your Party (2026–present)
Labour politician	Jean Corston, Baroness Corston	26 June 2003	Chair of the Parliamentary Labour Party (2001–2005)
HM judiciary	Hazel Cosgrove, Lady Cosgrove	27 February 2003; 8 May 2003	Senator of the College of Justice, Inner House (2003–2006)
Clergy	Stephen Cottrell	21 July 2020; 23 June 2021	Archbishop of York (2020–present)
HM judiciary	Peter Coulson	24 April 2018; 23 May 2018	Lord Justice of Appeal (2018–present)
Conservative politician	Claire Coutinho	15 September 2023	Secretary of State for Energy Security and Net Zero (2023–2024); Shadow Secretary of State for Energy Security and Net Zero (2024–2026); Shadow Minister for Equalities (2024–2026); Shadow Secretary of State for Business, Innovation, Science and Trade (2026–present)
Conservative politician	Geoffrey Cox	11 July 2018	Attorney General for England and Wales (2018–2020)
Conservative politician	Stephen Crabb	16 July 2014	Secretary of State for Wales (2014–2016); Secretary of State for Work and Pensions (2016)
Commonwealth politician	Wyatt Creech	24 November 1999	Deputy Prime Minister of New Zealand (1998–1999); Deputy Leader of the Opposition (1999–2001)
HM judiciary	William Cullen, Baron Cullen of Whitekirk	12 February 1997	Lord Justice Clerk (1997–2001); Lord President of the Court of Session and Lord Justice General (2001–2005)
Labour politician	Jack Cunningham, Baron Cunningham of Felling	1993; 29 July 1998	Shadow Foreign Secretary (1992–1994); Minister of Agriculture, Fisheries and Food (1997–1998); Chancellor of the Duchy of Lancaster and Minister for the Cabinet Office (1998–1999)
Conservative politician	David Curry	26 June 1996	Minister of State at the Department for Environment (1993–1997); Shadow Minister of Agriculture, Fisheries and Food (1997); Secretary of State for Local and Devolved Government (2003–2004)
Other politician	Frances D'Souza, Baroness D'Souza	8 July 2009	Convener of the Crossbench peers (2007–2011); Lord Speaker (2011–2016)
Labour politician	Ara Darzi, Baron Darzi of Denham	8 July 2009; 15 October 2009	Minister for Health (House of Lords) (2007–2009)
Lib. Dem. politician	Ed Davey	8 February 2012	Secretary of State for Energy and Climate Change (2012–2015); Leader of the Liberal Democrats (2020–present)
Conservative politician	Ruth Davidson, Baroness Davidson of Lundin Links	15 July 2016; 12 October 2016	Leader of the Scottish Conservatives (2011–2019)
Conservative politician	David T. C. Davies	27 October 2022	Secretary of State for Wales (2022–2024); Chief of Staff to the Welsh Conservatives (2024–present)
HM judiciary	Nicola Davies	7 November 2018	Lady Justice of Appeal (2018–present)
Other politician	Ron Davies	1997	Shadow Secretary of State for Wales (1992–1997); Secretary of State for Wales (1997–1998)
Conservative politician	David Davis	12 February 1997	Minister of State for Europe (1994–1997); Chair of the Commons Public Accounts Committee (1997–2001); Chair of the Conservative Party (2001–2002); Shadow Secretary of State for the Office of the Deputy Prime Minister (2002–2003); Shadow Home Secretary (2003–2008); Secretary of State for Exiting the European Union (2016–2018)
HM judiciary	Nigel Davis	16 November 2011; 15 February 2012	Lord Justice of Appeal (2011–2021)
Conservative politician	John Gummer, Baron Deben	1985	Chair of the Conservative Party (1983–1985); Paymaster General (1984–1985); Minister of Agriculture, Fisheries and Food (1989–1993); Secretary of State for the Environment (1993–1997)
HM judiciary	Donnell Deeny	11 October 2017; 15 November 2017	Lord Justice of Appeal, Northern Ireland (2017–2019)
Labour politician	John Denham	19 April 2000; 14 June 2000	Minister at the Department of Health (1999–2001); Minister for Policing (2001–2003); Secretary of State for Innovation, Universities and Skills (2007–2009); Secretary of State for Communities and Local Government (2009–2010); Parliamentary Private Secretary to the Leader of the Opposition (2011–2013)
Lib. Dem. politician	Navnit Dholakia, Baron Dholakia	15 December 2010; 16 March 2011	Deputy Leader of the Liberal Democrats in the House of Lords (2004–present)
HM judiciary	James Dingemans	17 December 2019; 11 March 2020	Lord Justice of Appeal (2019–present); Senior President of Tribunals (2025–present)
Labour politician	Anneliese Dodds	10 July 2024	Minister of State for Development (2024–2025); Minister of State for Women and Equalities (2024–2025)
Other politician	Nigel Dodds, Baron Dodds of Duncairn	9 June 2010; 13 October 2010	Deputy Leader of the Democratic Unionist Party (2008–2021); Leader of the Democratic Unionist Party in the House of Commons (2010–2019); Leader of the Democratic Unionist Party in the House of Lords (2021–present)
HM judiciary	Raymond Doherty, Lord Doherty	13 April 2022	Senator of the College of Justice, Inner House (2020–2026); Justice of the Supreme Court of the United Kingdom (2026–present)
Conservative politician	Michelle Donelan	20 September 2021; 10 November 2021	Minister of State for Higher and Further Education (2020–2022); Secretary of State for Education (2022); Secretary of State for Digital, Culture, Media and Sport (2022–2023); Secretary of State for Science, Innovation and Technology (2023–2024)
Lib. Dem. politician	Stephen Dorrell	1994	Secretary of State for National Heritage (1994–1995); Secretary of State for Health (1995–1997)
HM judiciary	Leeona Dorrian, Lady Dorrian	12 February 2013; 9 October 2013	Senator of the College of Justice, Inner House (2012–2016); Lord Justice Clerk (2016–2025)
Other politician	Nadine Dorries	20 September 2021	Secretary of State for Digital, Culture, Media and Sport (2021–2022)
Commonwealth politician	Denzil Douglas	16 November 2011; 15 February 2012	Prime Minister of Saint Kitts and Nevis (1995–2015)
HM judiciary	Ian Dove	10 December 2025	Lord Justice of Appeal (2025–present)
Conservative politician	Oliver Dowden	25 July 2019; 8 October 2019	Minister for the Cabinet Office and Paymaster General (2019–2021); Chair of the Conservative Party and Minister without Portfolio (2021–2022); Chancellor of the Duchy of Lancaster (2022–2024); Secretary of State in the Cabinet Office (2023–2024); Deputy Prime Minister (2023–2024); Shadow Deputy Prime Minister of the United Kingdom and Shadow Chancellor of the Duchy of Lancaster (2024)
Labour politician	Mark Drakeford	13 February 2019	First Minister of Wales (2018–2024); Cabinet Secretary for Health and Social Care in the Welsh Government (2024); Cabinet Secretary for Finance and Welsh Language in the Welsh Government (2024–2026)
Labour politician	Paul Drayson, Baron Drayson	9 October 2008; 5 November 2008	Minister for Science and Innovation (2008–2010); Minister of State for Strategic Defence Acquisition Reform (2009–2010)
HM judiciary	James Drummond Young, Lord Drummond Young	9 October 2013; 6 November 2013	Senator of the College of Justice, Inner House (2013–2020)
Conservative politician	Alan Duncan	9 June 2010	Minister for International Development (2010–2014); Minister for Europe and the Americas (2016–2019)
Conservative politician	Iain Duncan Smith	19 September 2001; 31 October 2001	Leader of the Opposition (2001–2003); Secretary of State for Work and Pensions (2010–2016)
Conservative politician	Philip Dunne	13 February 2019	MP (2005–2024)
HM judiciary	John Dyson, Lord Dyson	14 March 2001	Lord Justice of Appeal (2001–2010); Justice of the Supreme Court of the United Kingdom (2010–2012); Master of the Rolls (2012–2016)
Labour politician	Dame Angela Eagle	21 July 2026	Secretary of State for Environment, Food and Rural Affairs (2026–present)
Labour politician	Maria Eagle	15 February 2023; 8 March 2023	Member of the Intelligence and Security Committee of Parliament (2022–2024); Minister of State for Defence Procurement and Industry (2024–2025)
HM judiciary	Ronald Mackay, Lord Eassie	14 November 2006; 7 February 2007	Senator of the College of Justice, Inner House (2006–2015)
HM judiciary	Sir Andrew Edis	10 March 2021; 26 May 2021	Lord Justice of Appeal (2021–present); Senior Presiding Judge for England and Wales (2022–2024)
HM judiciary	Sir David Edward	14 December 2005; 14 February 2006	Judge at the European Court of Justice (1992–2004); Temporary Judge at the Court of Session (2005–2009)
Conservative politician	Timothy Eggar	8 February 1995; 15 March 1995	Minister for Energy in the Department of Trade and Industry (1992–1996)
HM judiciary	Patrick Elias	18 March 2009; 13 May 2009	Lord Justice of Appeal (2009–2017)
Commonwealth judiciary	Sian Elias	24 November 1999; 6 May 2004	Chief Justice of New Zealand (1999–2019)
Conservative politician	Michael Ellis	8 October 2019; 12 February 2020	Solicitor General for England and Wales (2019–2021); Attorney General for England and Wales (2021); Paymaster General (2021–2022); Minister for the Cabinet Office (2022); Attorney General for England and Wales (2022)
Conservative politician	Tobias Ellwood	12 April 2017; 3 May 2017	Minister at the Foreign Office (2014–2017); Parliamentary Under-Secretary of State for Defence Veterans, Reserves and Personnel (2017–2019); Chair of the Defence Select Committee (2020–2024)
HM judiciary	Nigel Emslie, Lord Emslie	7 April 2011; 10 May 2011	Senator of the College of Justice, Inner House (2010–2012)
HM judiciary	Andrew Stewart, Lord Ericht	11 June 2025	Senator of the College of Justice, Inner House (2025–present)
Conservative politician	George Eustice	19 February 2020	Secretary of State for Environment, Food and Rural Affairs (2020–2022)
Conservative politician	Nigel Evans	10 March 2021; 26 May 2021	Deputy Speaker of the House of Commons and Second Deputy Chairman of Ways and Means (2020–2024)
Conservative politician	Natalie Evans, Baroness Evans of Bowes Park	15 July 2016	Leader of the House of Lords and Lord Privy Seal (2016–2022)
Labour politician	Miatta Fahnbulleh	21 July 2026	Secretary of State for Energy Security and Net Zero (2026–present)
Labour politician	Charles Falconer, Baron Falconer of Thoroton	12 June 2003	Lord Chancellor (2003–2007); Secretary of State for Constitutional Affairs (2003–2007); Secretary of State for Justice (2007); Shadow Justice Secretary and Shadow Lord Chancellor (2015–2016); Shadow Attorney General for England and Wales (2020–2021); Shadow Advocate General for Northern Ireland (2020–2021); Shadow Advocate General for Scotland (2021); Shadow Minister for Scotland (2021)
Labour politician	Hamish Falconer	21 July 2026	Minister for Intergovernmental Relations and European Relations (2026–present)
HM judiciary	Sarah Falk	14 December 2022; 15 February 2023	Lady Justice of Appeal (2022–present)
Conservative politician	Michael Fallon	10 September 2012; 17 October 2012	Minister of State for Business and Enterprise (2012–2014); Minister of State at the Department of Energy and Climate Change (2013–2014); Secretary of State for Defence (2014–2017)
Lib. Dem. politician	Lynne Featherstone, Baroness Featherstone	16 July 2014	Parliamentary Under-Secretary of State for International Development (2012–2014); Minister of State at the Home Office (2014–2015); Liberal Democrat Spokesperson for Energy and Climate Change (2015–2019)
Conservative politician	Andrew Feldman, Baron Feldman of Elstree	14 May 2015	Chair of the Conservative Party (2010–2016)
Conservative politician	Mark Field	19 March 2015	Minister of State for Asia and the Pacific (2017–2019)
HM judiciary	Julian Flaux	15 February 2017	Lord Justice of Appeal (2016–2021); Chancellor of the High Court (2021–2025)
Labour politician	Caroline Flint	30 January 2008; 12 March 2008	Minister for Europe (2008–2009); Shadow Secretary of State for Communities and Local Government (2010–2011); Shadow Secretary of State for Energy and Climate Change (2011–2015)
HM judiciary	Christopher Floyd	15 May 2013; 9 October 2013	Lord Justice of Appeal (2013–2021)
Other politician	Stephen Flynn	10 April 2024; 22 May 2024	Leader of the SNP group in the House of Commons (2022–2026); Cabinet Secretary for Economy, Transport and Tourism in the Scottish Government (2026–present)
Conservative politician	Vicky Ford	13 September 2022; 9 November 2022	Minister of State for Development (2022)
Other politician	Michael Forsyth, Baron Forsyth of Drumlean	8 February 1995	Secretary of State for Scotland (1995–1997); Chair of the Lords Economic Affairs Committee (2017–2022); Lord Speaker (2026–present)
Other politician	Arlene Foster, Baroness Foster of Aghadrumsee	15 July 2016; 12 October 2016	First Minister of Northern Ireland (2016–2021); Leader of the Democratic Unionist Party (2015–2021)
Lib. Dem. politician	Don Foster, Baron Foster of Bath	15 December 2010; 16 March 2011	Long-serving MP (1992–2015); Parliamentary Under Secretary at the Department for Communities and Local Government (2012–2013); Comptroller of the Household (2013–2015); Liberal Democrat Spokesperson for Business, Energy and Industrial Strategy (2016–2017)
Labour politician	George Foulkes, Baron Foulkes of Cumnock	26 June 2002; 16 July 2002	Minister for Scotland (2001–2002)
Other politician	Norman Fowler, Baron Fowler	1979	Secretary of State for Transport (1979–1981); Secretary of State for Social Services (1981–1987); Secretary of State for Employment (1987–1990); Chair of the Conservative Party (1992–1994); Shadow Secretary of State for Environment, Transport and the Regions (1997–1998); Shadow Home Secretary (1998–1999); Lord Speaker (2016–2021)
Conservative politician	Liam Fox	13 May 2010	Secretary of State for Defence (2010–2011); Secretary of State for International Trade (2016–2019)
HM judiciary	David Foxton	10 March 2026	Lord Justice of Appeal (2026–present)
Conservative politician	Mark Francois	9 June 2010	Vice Chamberlain of the Household (2010–2012); Minister at the Ministry of Defence (2012–2015); Minister of State for Communities and Resilience (2015–2016); Minister for Portsmouth (2015–2016); Shadow Defence Minister (2024–present)
HM judiciary	Peter Fraser	22 May 2024	Lord Justice of Appeal (2023–present)
Conservative politician	Lucy Frazer	10 March 2021; 21 July 2021	Solicitor General for England and Wales (2019, 2021); Financial Secretary to the Treasury (2021–2022); Minister of State for Transport (2022); Minister of State for Housing and Planning (2022–2023); Secretary of State for Culture, Media and Sport (2023–2024)
Labour politician	Lawrence Freedman	8 July 2009; 17 November 2009	Key foreign policy advisor to Tony Blair (c. 1997–2007); Member of the Iraq Inquiry
Conservative politician	David Freud, Baron Freud	14 May 2015	Minister for Welfare Reform (2015–2016)
Conservative politician	David Frost, Baron Frost	10 March 2021; 10 November 2021	Minister of State for the Cabinet Office (2021)
HM judiciary	Adrian Fulford	13 June 2013; 9 October 2013	Lord Justice of Appeal (2013–present); Senior Presiding Judge for England and Wales (2016–2017); Investigatory Powers Commissioner (2017–2019)
Conservative politician	Roger Gale	13 February 2019	Long-serving MP (1983–present)
Lib. Dem. politician	Susan Garden, Baroness Garden of Frognal	19 March 2015; 30 March 2015	Baroness-in-waiting (2010–2013 and 2014–2015); Deputy Speaker of the House of Lords (2018–present)
Conservative politician	Edward Garnier, Baron Garnier	19 March 2015; 30 March 2015	Long-serving MP (1992–2017)
Conservative politician	David Gauke	15 July 2016; 12 October 2016	Financial Secretary to the Treasury (2014–2016); Chief Secretary to the Treasury (2016–2017); Secretary of State for Work and Pensions (2017–2018); Lord Chancellor and Secretary of State for Justice (2018–2019)
Royal Family/ Household	Christopher Geidt, Baron Geidt	25 July 2007	Private Secretary to the Queen (2007–2017)
Labour politician	Vaughan Gething	10 April 2024	First Minister of Wales (2024)
Conservative politician	Nick Gibb	16 November 2016; 15 February 2017	Minister of State for School Standards (2010–2012 and 2015–2021); Minister of State for School Reform (2014–2015); Minister of State for Schools (2022–2023)
HM judiciary	Peter Gibson	1993	Lord Justice of Appeal (1993–2005); Intelligence Services Commissioner (2006–2010); Chair of the Torture inquiry (2010–2013)
HM judiciary	Brian Gill, Lord Gill	26 March 2002	Lord Justice Clerk (2001–2012); Lord President of the Court of Session and Lord Justice General (2012–2015)
HM judiciary	John Gillen	10 December 2014; 19 March 2015	Lord Justice of Appeal, Northern Ireland (2014–2017)
HM judiciary	Paul Girvan	7 February 2007	Lord Justice of Appeal, Northern Ireland (2007–2015)
Conservative politician	John Glen	27 October 2022; 9 November 2022	Chief Secretary to the Treasury (2022–2023); Minister for the Cabinet Office and Paymaster General (2023–2024); Shadow Paymaster General (2024); Parliamentary Private Secretary to the Leader of the Opposition (2025–present)
HM judiciary	Angus Glennie, Lord Glennie	13 July 2016; 12 October 2016	Senator of the College of Justice (2005–2020)
HM judiciary	Elizabeth Gloster	15 May 2013; 13 June 2013	Lady Justice of Appeal (2013–2018)
HM judiciary	John Goldring	5 November 2008; 11 February 2009	Lord Justice of Appeal (2009–2014); Senior Presiding Judge for England and Wales (2010–2012); Intelligence Services Commissioner (2017)
Labour politician	Peter Goldsmith, Baron Goldsmith	26 March 2002; 22 May 2002	Attorney General for England and Wales (2001–2007)
Conservative politician	Zac Goldsmith, Baron Goldsmith of Richmond Park	8 October 2019; 6 November 2019	Minister of State for the International Environment (2019–2020); Minister of State for the Pacific and the Environment (2019–2022); Minister of State for Overseas Territories, Commonwealth, Energy, Climate and Environment (2022–2023)
Conservative politician	Alastair Goodlad, Baron Goodlad	1992	Treasurer of the Household and Government Deputy Chief Whip in the Commons (1990–1992); Minister of State at the Foreign and Commonwealth Office (1992–1995); Government Chief Whip in the Commons and Parliamentary Secretary to the Treasury (1995–1997); Shadow Leader of the House of Commons and Opposition Chief Whip in the Commons (1997); Shadow Secretary of State for International Development (1997–1998); High Commissioner to Australia (2000–2005)
Conservative politician	Robert Goodwill	24 April 2018; 23 May 2018	Minister for Agriculture, Fisheries and Food (2019)
Conservative politician	Michael Gove, Baron Gove	13 May 2010	Secretary of State for Education (2010–2014); Parliamentary Secretary to the Treasury and Government Chief Whip (2014–2015); Lord Chancellor and Secretary of State for Justice (2015–2016); Secretary of State for Environment, Food and Rural Affairs (2017–2019); Chancellor of the Duchy of Lancaster (2019–2021); Minister for the Cabinet Office (2020–2021); Secretary of State for Levelling Up, Housing and Communities (2021–2022, 2022–2024); Minister for Intergovernmental Relations (2021–2022, 2022–2024)
Commonwealth politician	Doug Graham	21 May 1998	New Zealand Minister of Justice (1990–1999); Attorney-General of New Zealand (1997–1999)
Conservative politician	Chris Grayling, Baron Grayling	9 June 2010; 21 July 2010	Minister at the Department for Work and Pensions (2010–2012); Lord Chancellor and Secretary of State for Justice (2012–2015); Lord President of the Council and Leader of the House of Commons (2015–2016); Secretary of State for Transport (2016–2019)
Conservative politician	Damian Green	10 September 2012; 17 October 2012	Minister for Policing and Criminal Justice (2012–2014); Secretary of State for Work and Pensions (2016–2017); First Secretary of State and Minister for the Cabinet Office (2017)
HM judiciary	Nicholas Green	7 November 2018	Lord Justice of Appeal (2018–present); Senior Presiding Judge for England and Wales (2024–present)
Conservative politician	Justine Greening	17 October 2011	Secretary of State for Transport (2011–2012); Secretary of State for International Development (2012–2016); Secretary of State for Education (2016–2018)
Other politician	Dominic Grieve	9 June 2010	Attorney General for England and Wales (2010–2014); Chair of the Intelligence and Security Committee (2015–2019)
Labour politician	Bruce Grocott, Baron Grocott	5 November 2002; 20 November 2002	Government Chief Whip in the Lords (2002–2008)
HM judiciary	Peter Gross	16 March 2011; 10 May 2011	Lord Justice of Appeal (2010–2019); Senior Presiding Judge for England and Wales (2013–2015)
Conservative politician	Ben Gummer	15 July 2016; 12 October 2016	Minister for the Cabinet Office and Paymaster General (2016–2017)
HM judiciary	Charles Haddon-Cave	7 November 2018	Lord Justice of Appeal (2018–present); Senior Presiding Judge for England and Wales (2021–2022)
Conservative politician	William Hague, Baron Hague of Richmond	10 July 1995	Secretary of State for Wales (1995–1997); Leader of the Opposition (1997–2001); Shadow Foreign Secretary and Senior Member of the Shadow Cabinet (2005–2010); Foreign Secretary and First Secretary of State (2010–2014); Leader of the House of Commons and First Secretary of State (2014–2015)
Labour politician	Louise Haigh	10 July 2024	Secretary of State for Transport (2024); First Secretary of State, Chancellor of the Duchy of Lancaster and Minister for the Cabinet Office (2026–present)
Conservative politician	Douglas Hogg, 3rd Viscount Hailsham	1992	Minister of State for Indo-Pacific (1992–1995); Minister of Agriculture, Fisheries and Food (1995–1997)
Labour politician	Peter Hain, Baron Hain	18 July 2001	Minister of State for Europe (2000–2002); Secretary of State for Wales (2002–2008, 2009–2010); Lord Privy Seal and Leader of the House of Commons (2003–2005); Secretary of State for Northern Ireland (2005–2007); Secretary of State for Work and Pensions (2007–2008); Shadow Secretary of State for Wales (2010–2012)
HM judiciary	Brenda Hale, Baroness Hale of Richmond	24 November 1999	Lord Justice of Appeal (1999–2004); Lord of Appeal in Ordinary (2004–2009); Justice of the Supreme Court of the United Kingdom (2009–2013); Deputy President of the Supreme Court (2013–2017); President of the Supreme Court (2017–2020)
Conservative politician	Robert Halfon	14 May 2015	Minister without Portfolio, attending Cabinet (2015–2016); Deputy Chair of the Conservative Party (2015–2016); Minister of State for Skills (2016–2017); Minister of State for Skills, Apprenticeships and Higher Education (2022–2024)
HM judiciary	Heather Hallett, Baroness Hallett	15 November 2005	Lady Justice of Appeal (2005–2019)
HM judiciary	Nicholas Hamblen, Lord Hamblen	12 April 2016; 8 June 2016	Lord Justice of Appeal (2015–2020); Justice of the Supreme Court of the United Kingdom (2020–present)
HM judiciary	Arthur Hamilton, Lord Hamilton	26 March 2002	Senator of the College of Justice, Inner House (2002–2005); Lord President of the Court of Session and Lord Justice General (2005–2012)
Conservative politician	Archie Hamilton, Baron Hamilton of Epsom	1991	Minister of State for the Armed Forces (1986–1993); Chair of the 1922 Committee (1997–2001)
Conservative politician	Philip Hammond, Baron Hammond of Runnymede	13 May 2010	Secretary of State for Transport (2010–2011); Secretary of State for Defence (2011–2014); Foreign Secretary (2014–2016); Chancellor of the Exchequer (2016–2019)
Conservative politician	Matthew Hancock	16 July 2014	Minister of State for Skills and Enterprise (2014–2015); Minister for the Cabinet Office and Paymaster General (2015–2016); Minister for Digital and Culture (2016–2018); Secretary of State for Digital, Culture, Media and Sport (2018); Secretary of State for Health and Social Care (2018–2021)
Conservative politician	Greg Hands	5 March 2014	Deputy Conservative Chief Whip in the House of Commons (2013–2015); Chief Secretary to the Treasury (2015–2016); Minister of State for Trade Policy (2016–2018, 2020–2021, 2022–2023 and 2023–2024); Minister for London (2017–2018 and 2023–2024); Minister of State for Business, Energy and Clean Growth (2021–2022); Chair of the Conservative Party and Minister without Portfolio (2023)
Labour politician	David Hanson, Baron Hanson of Flint	6 March 2007	Minister of State for Justice (2007–2009); Minister of State for Security, Counter-Terrorism, Crime and Policing (2009–2010); Shadow Financial Secretary to the Treasury (2010–2011); Shadow Minister at the Home Office (2011–2015); Minister of State at the Home Office (2024–present)
HM judiciary	Andrew Hardie, Baron Hardie	20 May 1997	Lord Advocate (1997–2000); Senator of the College of Justice, Inner House (2010–2012)
Labour politician	Harriet Harman, Baroness Harman	1997	Secretary of State for Social Security (1997–1998); Minister for Women and Equality (1997–1998 and 2007–2010); Solicitor General (2001–2005); Minister of State for Constitutional Affairs (2005–2007); Minister of State for Justice (2007); Deputy Leader and Chair of the Labour Party (2007–2015); Leader of the House of Commons and Lord Privy Seal (2007–2010); Leader of the Labour Party and Leader of the Opposition (2010 and 2015)
Conservative politician	Mark Harper, Baron Harper	14 May 2015	Government Chief Whip in the Commons and Parliamentary Secretary to the Treasury (2015–2016); Secretary of State for Transport (2022–2024)
Conservative politician	Simon Hart, Baron Hart of Tenby	17 December 2019	Secretary of State for Wales (2019–2022); Government Chief Whip in the Commons and Parliamentary Secretary to the Treasury (2022–2024)
Conservative politician	John Hayes	9 April 2013; 15 May 2013	Minister without portfolio at the Cabinet Office (2013–2014); Minister of State for Transport (2014–2015 and 2016–2018); Minister of State for Security (2015–2016)
Other politician	Helene Hayman, Baroness Hayman	30 November 2000; 14 February 2001	Minister of State for Agriculture, Fisheries and Food (1999–2001); Lord Speaker (2006–2011)
Conservative politician	Oliver Heald	12 October 2016; 16 November 2016	Minister of State for Courts and Justice (2016–2017)
Labour politician	John Healey	5 November 2008	Minister of State for Local Government (2007–2009); Minister of State for Housing and Planning (2009–2010); Shadow Secretary of State for Health (2010–2011); Shadow Secretary of State for Housing (2016–2020); Shadow Secretary of State for Defence (2020–2024); Secretary of State for Defence (2024–2026); Chancellor of the Exchequer (2026–present)
Conservative politician	James Heappey	13 September 2022; 9 November 2022	Minister of State for the Armed Forces (2020–2024)
Lib. Dem. politician	David Heath	19 March 2015	Long-serving MP (1997–2015)
Conservative politician	David Heathcoat-Amory	14 February 1996	Paymaster General (1994–1996); Shadow Chief Secretary to the Treasury (1997–2000); Shadow Secretary of State for Trade and Industry (2000–2001)
Conservative politician	Chris Heaton-Harris	16 February 2022	Government Chief Whip in the Commons and Parliamentary Secretary to the Treasury (2022); Secretary of State for Northern Ireland (2022–2024)
HM judiciary	Launcelot Henderson	14 December 2016; 15 February 2017	Lord Justice of Appeal (2016–2021)
Conservative politician	Charles Hendry	19 March 2015	Long-serving MP (1992–1997, 2001–2015)
Conservative politician	Oliver Eden, 8th Baron Henley	9 January 2013; 13 March 2013	Parliamentary Under-Secretary of State for Resource Management, the Local Environment and Environmental Science (2010–2012); Minister of State at the Home Office (2011–2012); Lord-in-waiting (2016–2017); Parliamentary Under-Secretary for Work and Pensions (2016–2017); Parliamentary Under-Secretary at the Department for Business, Energy and Industrial Strategy (2017–2019)
Conservative politician	Nick Herbert, Baron Herbert of South Downs	9 June 2010; 21 July 2010	Minister for Policing and Criminal Justice (2010–2012)
Labour politician	Richard Hermer, Baron Hermer	10 July 2024	Attorney General for England and Wales (2024–2026)
Conservative politician	Michael Heseltine, Baron Heseltine	1979	Secretary of State for the Environment (1979–1983 and 1990–1992); Secretary of State for Defence (1983–1986); President of the Board of Trade (1992–1995); Deputy Prime Minister and First Secretary of State (1995–1997)
Conservative politician	Alexander Fermor-Hesketh, 3rd Baron Hesketh	1991	Government Chief Whip in the Lords and Captain of the Gentlemen-at-Arms (1991–1993)
Labour politician	Patricia Hewitt	9 June 2001	Secretary of State for Trade and Industry, and Minister for Women (2001–2005); Secretary of State for Health (2005–2007)
HM judiciary	Gary Hickinbottom	3 May 2017	Lord Justice of Appeal (2017–2021)
HM judiciary	Malachy Higgins	7 February 2007	Lord Justice of Appeal, Northern Ireland (2007–2014)
Conservative politician	Jonathan Hill, Baron Hill of Oareford	9 January 2013	Leader of the House of Lords and Chancellor of the Duchy of Lancaster (2013–2014); European Commissioner for Financial Stability Financial Services and Capital Markets Union (2014–2016)
Labour politician	Keith Hill	26 June 2003	Minister for London (1999–2001); Deputy Chief Whip and Treasurer of the Household (2001–2003); Minister for Housing and Planning (2003–2005); Parliamentary Private Secretary to the Prime Minister (2005–2007)
Conservative politician	Damian Hinds	11 January 2018	Secretary of State for Education (2018–2019); Minister of State for Prisons, Parole and Probation (2022–2023); Minister of State for Schools (2023–2024); Shadow Secretary of State for Education (2024); Shadow Secretary of State for Health and Social Care (2026–present)
Labour politician	Margaret Hodge, Baroness Hodge of Barking	26 June 2003	Minister for Children (2003–2005); Minister of State for Work (2005–2006); Minister at the Department of Trade and Industry (2006–2007); Minister for Culture, Creative Industries and Tourism (2007–2008); Minister for Department for Culture, Media and Sport (2009–2010); Chair of the Commons Public Accounts Committee (2010–2015)
HM judiciary	Patrick Hodge, Lord Hodge	15 May 2013; 13 June 2013	Justice of the Supreme Court of the United Kingdom (2013–2020); Deputy President of the Supreme Court (2020–2025)
HM judiciary	Leonard Hoffmann, Baron Hoffmann	1992	Lord Justice of Appeal (1992–1995); Lord of Appeal in Ordinary (1995–2009)
Conservative politician	Richard Holden	13 December 2023	Minister without Portfolio and Chair of the Conservative Party (2023–2024); Shadow Paymaster General (2024–2025); Shadow Secretary of State for Transport (2025–present)
HM judiciary	David Holgate	6 November 2024	Lord Justice of Appeal (2024–present)
Commonwealth politician	Andrew Holness	26 May 2021 (app.)	Prime Minister of Jamaica (2016–present)
HM judiciary	Timothy Holroyde	15 November 2017; 8 February 2018	Lord Justice of Appeal (2017–present)
Labour politician	Geoff Hoon	12 October 1999	Secretary of State for Defence (1999–2005); Leader of the House of Commons and Lord Privy Seal (2005–2006); Minister of State for Europe (2006–2007); Government Chief Whip in the Commons and Parliamentary Secretary to the Treasury (2007–2008); Secretary of State for Transport (2008–2009)
HM judiciary	Anthony Hooper	6 May 2004; 10 June 2004	Lord Justice of Appeal (2004–2012)
HM judiciary	David Hope, Baron Hope of Craighead	1989	Lord President of the Court of Session and Lord Justice General (1989–1996); Lord of Appeal in Ordinary (1996–2009); Deputy President of the Supreme Court (2009–2013); Convener of the Crossbench peers (2015–2019)
Clergy	David Hope, Baron Hope of Thornes	1991	Bishop of London (1991–1995); Archbishop of York (1995–2005)
HM judiciary	Mark Horner	19 October 2022; 9 November 2022	Lord Justice of Appeal, Northern Ireland (2022–present)
Other politician	Stewart Hosie	10 March 2021; 29 September 2021	SNP Shadow Chancellor of the Duchy of Lancaster and Shadow Minister for the Cabinet Office (2021–2022); SNP Spokesperson on the Economy (2022–2023)
Conservative politician	Michael Howard, Baron Howard of Lympne	1990	Secretary of State for Employment (1990–1992); Secretary of State for the Environment (1992–1993); Home Secretary (1993–1997); Shadow Foreign Secretary (1997–1999); Shadow Chancellor of the Exchequer (2001–2003); Leader of the Opposition (2003–2005)
Conservative politician	Frederick Curzon, 7th Earl Howe	9 January 2013; 12 February 2013	Parliamentary Under-Secretary of State at the Department of Health (2010–2015); Minister of State for Defence (2015–2019); Deputy Leader of the House of Lords (2015–2024); Shadow Deputy Leader of the House of Lords (2024–2026)
Conservative politician	David Howell, Baron Howell of Guildford	1979	Secretary of State for Energy (1979–1981); Secretary of State for Transport (1981–1983); Shadow Deputy Leader of the House of Lords (2005–2010); Shadow Minister for Foreign Affairs (2007–2010); Minister at the Foreign and Commonwealth Office (2010–2012)
Labour politician	Kim Howells	11 February 2009; 18 March 2009	Long serving MP (1989–2010); Chair of the Intelligence and Security Committee (2008–2010)
Other politician	Lindsay Hoyle	12 February 2013	Chairman of Ways and Means (2010–2019); Speaker of the House of Commons (2019–present)
HM judiciary	Anthony Hughes, Lord Hughes of Ombersley	19 July 2006	Lord Justice of Appeal (2006–2013); Justice of the Supreme Court of the United Kingdom (2013–2018)
Labour politician	Beverley Hughes, Baroness Hughes of Stretford	11 February 2004	Minister for Immigration and Counter-Terrorism (2002–2004); Minister of State for Children (2005–2009); Minister for the North West (2007–2009)
Lib. Dem. politician	Simon Hughes	15 December 2010; 9 February 2011	Deputy Leader of the Liberal Democrats (2010–2014); Minister at the Ministry of Justice (2013–2015)
Conservative politician	David Hunt, Baron Hunt of Wirral	1990	Secretary of State for Wales (1990–1993 and 1995); Secretary of State for Employment (1993–1994); Chancellor of the Duchy of Lancaster (1994–1995); Shadow Minister for Business and Trade (2025–present)
Conservative politician	Jeremy Hunt	13 May 2010	Secretary of State for Culture, Olympics, Media and Sport (2010–2012); Secretary of State for Health (2012–2018); Foreign Secretary (2018–2019); Chancellor of the Exchequer (2022–2024); Shadow Chancellor of the Exchequer (2024)
Labour politician	Philip Hunt, Baron Hunt of Kings Heath	8 July 2009	Deputy Leader of the House of Lords (2008–2010); Shadow Deputy Leader of the House of Lords (2010–2011); Minister of State for Energy Security and Net Zero (2024–2025)
Conservative politician	Nick Hurd	13 December 2017; 8 February 2018	Minister of State for Policing and the Fire Service (2017–2019); Minister for London (2018–2019); Minister of State for Northern Ireland (2019)
Conservative politician	Douglas Hurd, Baron Hurd of Westwell	1982	Minister of State for Europe (1979–1983); Minister at the Home Office (1983–1984); Secretary of State for Northern Ireland (1984–1985); Home Secretary (1985–1989); Foreign Secretary (1989–1995)
Labour politician	John Hutton, Baron Hutton of Furness	18 July 2001	Minister for Health (2001–2005); Chancellor of the Duchy of Lancaster and Minister for the Cabinet Office (2005); Secretary of State for Work and Pensions (2005–2007); Secretary of State for Business, Enterprise and Regulatory Reform (2007–2008); Secretary of State for Defence (2008–2009)
Commonwealth politician	Hubert Ingraham	1993	Prime Minister of the Bahamas (1992–2002 and 2007–2012)
Labour politician	Adam Ingram	10 February 1999	Junior Minister at the Northern Ireland Office (1997–2001); Armed Forces Minister at the Ministry of Defence (2001–2007)
HM judiciary	Derry Irvine, Baron Irvine of Lairg	1997	Lord Chancellor (1997–2003)
HM judiciary	Stephen Irwin	16 November 2016; 8 March 2017	Lord Justice of Appeal (2016–2020)
Conservative politician	Alister Jack, Baron Jack of Courance	25 July 2019	Secretary of State for Scotland (2019–2024)
Conservative politician	Michael Jack	12 February 1997	Financial Secretary to the Treasury (1995–1997); Shadow Agriculture Minister (1997–1998)
HM judiciary	Peter Jackson	15 November 2017; 8 February 2018	Lord Justice of Appeal (2017–present)
HM judiciary	Rupert Jackson	5 November 2008; 11 February 2009	Lord Justice of Appeal (2008–2018)
HM judiciary	Robin Jacob	11 February 2004	Lord Justice of Appeal (2003–2011)
HM judiciary	Francis Jacobs	14 December 2005; 14 February 2006	Advocate General in the European Court of Justice (1988–2006)
Royal Family/ Household	Robin Janvrin, Baron Janvrin	16 December 1998	Deputy Private Secretary to the Queen (1996–1999); Private Secretary to the Queen (1999–2007)
Labour politician	Dan Jarvis	15 June 2026	Secretary of State for Defence (2026); Minister of State for Security (2026–present)
Conservative politician	Sajid Javid	15 April 2014	Secretary of State for Culture, Media and Sport (2014–2015); Secretary of State for Business, Innovation and Skills (2015–2016); Secretary of State for Communities and Local Government (2016–2018); Home Secretary (2018–2019); Chancellor of the Exchequer (2019–2020); Secretary of State for Health and Social Care (2021–2022)
Labour politician	Margaret Jay, Baroness Jay of Paddington	29 July 1998	Leader of the House of Lords (1998–2001)
Conservative politician	Ranil Jayawardena	13 September 2022	Secretary of State for Environment, Food and Rural Affairs (2022)
Other politician	Robert Jenrick	25 July 2019	Secretary of State for Housing, Communities and Local Government (2019–2021); Minister of State at the Department of Health and Social Care (2022); Minister of State for Immigration (2022–2023); Shadow Secretary of State for Justice and Shadow Lord Chancellor (2024–2026)
Labour politician	Alan Johnson	8 October 2003	Minister for Higher Education (2003–2004); Secretary of State for Work and Pensions (2004–2005); Secretary of State for Trade and Industry and President of the Board of Trade (2005–2006); Secretary of State for Education and Skills (2006–2007); Health Secretary (2007–2009); Home Secretary (2009–2010)
Conservative politician	Boris Johnson	15 July 2016	Mayor of London (2008–2016); Foreign Secretary (2016–2018); Prime Minister of the United Kingdom (2019–2022)
Labour politician	Diana Johnson	10 March 2021; 21 July 2021	Long-serving MP (2005–present); Chair of the Home Affairs Select Committee (2021–2024); Minister of State for Policing, Fire and Crime Prevention (2024–2025); Minister of State for Employment (2025–present)
Conservative politician	Jo Johnson, Baron Johnson of Marylebone	25 July 2019; 8 October 2019	Minister of State for Universities, Science, Research and Innovation (2019)
Other politician	Alison Johnstone	16 March 2022	Presiding Officer of the Scottish Parliament (2021–2026)
Labour politician	Barry Jones, Baron Jones	22 June 1999; 21 July 1999	Intelligence and Security Committee (1994–2001)
Labour politician	Carwyn Jones, Baron Jones of Penybont	9 June 2010; 21 July 2010	First Minister of Wales (2009–2018)
Labour politician	Darren Jones	10 July 2024	Chief Secretary to the Treasury (2024–2025); Chief Secretary to the Prime Minister (2025–2026); Chancellor of the Duchy of Lancaster and Minister for Intergovernmental Relations (2025–2026)
Other politician	David Jones	10 September 2012	Secretary of State for Wales (2012–2014); Minister of State for Exiting the European Union (2016–2017)
Other politician	Elin Jones	16 March 2022	Llywydd of the Senedd/Presiding Officer of the National Assembly for Wales (2016–2026); Cabinet Secretary for Finance in the Welsh Government (2026–present)
Conservative politician	Marcus Jones	8 March 2023	Government Deputy Chief Whip and Treasurer of the Household (2022–2024)
Conservative politician	Michael Jopling, Baron Jopling	1979	Government Chief Whip in the Commons and Parliamentary Secretary to the Treasury (1979–1983); Minister of Agriculture, Fisheries and Food (1983–1987)
Other politician	Ajay Kakkar, Baron Kakkar	10 December 2014	Chair of the House of Lords Appointments Commission (2013–2018); Chair of the Judicial Appointments Commission (2016–2022)
HM judiciary	Maurice Kay	11 February 2004; 6 May 2004	Lord Justice of Appeal (2004–2014)
Conservative politician	Gillian Keegan	27 October 2022	Secretary of State for Education (2022–2024)
HM judiciary	Siobhan Keegan	29 September 2021; 10 November 2021	Lady Chief Justice of Northern Ireland (2021–present)
Conservative politician	Richard Keen, Baron Keen of Elie	11 October 2017; 15 November 2017	Advocate General for Scotland (2015–2020); Shadow Advocate General for Scotland (2024–present); Shadow Minister for Justice (2024–present)
HM judiciary	David Keene	30 November 2000; 14 February 2001	Lord Justice of Appeal (2000–2009)
Other politician	Ruth Kelly	16 December 2004	Secretary of State for Education and Skills (2004–2006); Secretary of State for Communities and Local Government and Minister for Women and Equality (2006–2007); Secretary of State for Transport (2007–2008)
Labour politician	Liz Kendall	6 July 2024	Secretary of State for Work and Pensions (2024–2025); Secretary of State for Science, Innovation and Technology (2025–2026)
Other politician	Jane Kennedy	8 October 2003; 13 November 2003	Minister for Education and Employment in Northern Ireland (2002–2004); Minister at the Department for Work and Pensions (2004–2005); Minister at the Department of Health (2005–2006); Financial Secretary to the Treasury (2007–2008); Minister for Farming and the Environment (2008–2009); Merseyside Police and Crime Commissioner (2012–2021)
HM judiciary	Paul Kennedy	1992	Lord Justice of Appeal (1992–2005); Vice President of the Queen's Bench Division (1997–2002)
Labour politician	Roy Kennedy, Baron Kennedy of Southwark	9 November 2022; 14 December 2022	Opposition Chief Whip in the Lords (2021–2024); Government Chief Whip in the Lords and Captain of the Gentlemen-at-Arms (2024–present)
Labour politician	Sadiq Khan, Baron Khan of Tooting	12 June 2009; 8 July 2009	Minister of State for Transport (2009–2010); Shadow Secretary of State for Transport (2010); Shadow Secretary of State for Justice (2010–2015); Shadow Lord Chancellor (2010–2015); Mayor of London (2016–present)
HM judiciary	Eleanor King	10 December 2014; 19 March 2015	Lady Justice of Appeal (2014–present)
Conservative politician	Tom King, Baron King of Bridgwater	1979	Minister at the Department of the Environment (1979–1983); Secretary of State for the Environment (1983); Secretary of State for Transport (1983); Secretary of State for Employment (1983–1985); Secretary of State for Northern Ireland (1985–1989); Secretary of State for Defence (1989–1992); Chair of the Intelligence and Security Committee (1994–2001)
HM judiciary	Derek Emslie, Lord Kingarth	8 March 2006; 9 May 2006	Senator of the College of Justice, Inner House (2005–2010)
Labour politician	Neil Kinnock, Baron Kinnock	1983	Leader of the Opposition (1983–1992); European Commissioner for Transport (1995–1999); Vice President of the European Commission (1999–2004)
Labour politician	Stephen Kinnock	21 July 2026	Secretary of State for Wales (2026–present)
Lib. Dem. politician	Archy Kirkwood, Baron Kirkwood of Kirkhope	19 April 2000; 17 May 2000	Liberal Democrat Chief Whip in the Lords (1992–1997)
HM judiciary	David Kitchin, Lord Kitchin	16 November 2011	Lord Justice of Appeal (2011–2018); Justice of the Supreme Court of the United Kingdom (2018–2023)
Conservative politician	Greg Knight	10 July 1995	Government Deputy Chief Whip in the Commons (1993–1996); Minister for Industry (1996–1997); Vice Chamberlain of the Household (2012–2013)
Labour politician	Jim Knight, Baron Knight of Weymouth	5 November 2008; 11 February 2009	Minister for Schools and Learners (2007–2009); Minister for Employment and Welfare Reform (2009–2010)
Lib. Dem. politician	Susan Kramer, Baroness Kramer	10 December 2014	Minister of State for Transport (2013–2015); Liberal Democrat Treasury spokesman (2015–2019); Liberal Democrat Treasury and Economy spokesperson in the Lords (2024–present)
Conservative politician	Kwasi Kwarteng	25 July 2019; 8 October 2019	Minister of State for Energy (2019–2021); Secretary of State for Business, Energy and Industrial Strategy (2021–2022); Chancellor of the Exchequer (2022)
Labour politician	Peter Kyle	10 July 2024	Secretary of State for Science, Innovation and Technology (2024–2025); Secretary of State for Business and Trade and President of the Board of Trade (2025–2026)
Conservative politician	Eleanor Laing, Baroness Laing of Elderslie	13 December 2017; 8 February 2018	First Deputy Chairman of Ways and Means (2013–2019); Chairman of Ways and Means (2020–2024)
HM judiciary	Elisabeth Laing	16 December 2020; 29 September 2021	Lady Justice of Appeal (2020–present)
Other politician	Norman Lamb	16 July 2014	Minister at the Department of Health (2012–2015)
Labour politician	David Lammy	5 November 2008	Minister for Higher Education and Intellectual Property (2008–2010); Shadow Secretary of State for Justice and Shadow Lord Chancellor (2020–2021); Shadow Foreign Secretary (2021–2024); Foreign Secretary (2024–2025); Deputy Prime Minister of the United Kingdom (2025–2026); Secretary of State for Justice and Lord Chancellor (2025–2026)
Conservative politician	Norman Lamont, Baron Lamont of Lerwick	1986	Financial Secretary to the Treasury (1986–1989); Chief Secretary to the Treasury (1989–1990); Chancellor of the Exchequer (1990–1993)
Conservative politician	Mark Lancaster, Baron Lancaster of Kimbolton	13 December 2017; 14 March 2018	Minister of State for the Armed Forces (2017–2019)
Conservative politician	Ian Lang, Baron Lang of Monkton	1990	Secretary of State for Scotland (1990–1995); President of the Board of Trade and Secretary of State for Trade and Industry (1995–1997)
Conservative politician	Andrew Lansley, Baron Lansley	13 May 2010	Secretary of State for Health (2010–2012); Leader of the House of Commons and Lord Privy Seal (2012–2014)
Commonwealth politician	Kamuta Latasi	26 June 1996; 3 January 2008	Prime Minister of Tuvalu (1993–1996); Speaker of the Parliament of Tuvalu (2006–2014)
HM judiciary	David Latham	19 April 2000; 17 May 2000	Lord Justice of Appeal (2000–2009)
Lib. Dem. politician	David Laws	13 May 2010	Chief Secretary to the Treasury (2010); Minister of State at the Cabinet Office (2012–2015)
Conservative politician	Andrea Leadsom	15 July 2016	Secretary of State for Environment, Food and Rural Affairs (2016–2017); Lord President of the Council and Leader of the House of Commons (2017–2019); Secretary of State for Business, Energy and Industrial Strategy (2019–2020); Parliamentary Under-Secretary of State for Public Health, Start for Life and Primary Care (2023–2024)
HM judiciary	George Leggatt, Lord Leggatt	24 April 2018; 23 May 2018	Lord Justice of Appeal (2018–2020); Justice of the Supreme Court of the United Kingdom (2020–present)
Conservative politician	Edward Leigh	13 February 2019	Long-serving MP (1983–present)
Conservative politician	Oliver Letwin	26 June 2002; 22 October 2002	Shadow Home Secretary (2001–2003); Shadow Chancellor of the Exchequer (2003–2005); Shadow Secretary of State for Environment, Food and Rural Affairs (2005); Chair of the Policy Review and Chair of the Conservative Research Department (2005–2010); Minister at the Cabinet Office (2010–2015); Chancellor of the Duchy of Lancaster (2014–2016)
HM judiciary	Brian Leveson, Baron Leveson of Liverpool	14 November 2006	Lord Justice of Appeal (2006–2013); Senior Presiding Judge for England and Wales (2007–2009); President of the Queen's Bench Division (2013–2019); Investigatory Powers Commissioner (2019–present)
Conservative politician	Brandon Lewis	12 October 2016; 16 November 2016	Minister of State for Policing, Fire and Criminal Justice (2016–2017); Minister of State for Immigration (2017–2018); Chair of the Conservative Party (2018–2019); Minister without Portfolio (2018–2019); Secretary of State for Northern Ireland (2020–2022); Secretary of State for Justice and Lord Chancellor (2022)
HM judiciary	Clive Lewis	11 November 2020; 28 April 2021	Lord Justice of Appeal (2020–present)
Conservative politician	Julian Lewis	19 March 2015; 30 March 2015	Long-serving MP (1997–present); Chair of the Defence Select Committee (2015–2019); Chair of the Intelligence and Security Committee (2020–2024)
HM judiciary	Kim Lewison	16 November 2011	Lord Justice of Appeal (2011–present)
Labour politician	Helen Liddell, Baroness Liddell of Coatdyke	29 October 1998; 16 December 1998	Economic Secretary to the Treasury (1997–1998); Secretary of State for Scotland (2001–2003); High Commissioner to Australia (2005–2009)
Conservative politician	David Lidington	15 December 2010; 9 February 2011	Minister for Europe (2010–2016); Lord President of the Council and Leader of the House of Commons (2016–2017); Lord Chancellor and Secretary of State for Justice (2017–2018); Chancellor of the Duchy of Lancaster (2018–2019); Minister for the Cabinet Office (2018–2019)
Conservative politician	Peter Lilley, Baron Lilley	1990	Secretary of State for Trade and Industry and President of the Board of Trade (1990–1992); Secretary of State for Social Security (1992–1997); Shadow Chancellor of the Exchequer (1997–1998); Deputy Leader of the Conservative Party (1998–1999)
HM judiciary	Keith Lindblom	4 May 2016; 8 June 2016	Lord Justice of Appeal (2015–2025); Senior President of Tribunals (2020–2025)
Conservative politician	Edward Llewellyn, Baron Llewellyn of Steep	14 May 2015	Downing Street Chief of Staff (2010–2016)
Conservative politician	Peter Lloyd	8 February 1994	Minister at the Home Office (1992–1994)
HM judiciary	Timothy Lloyd	7 June 2005	Lord Justice of Appeal (2005–2013)
HM judiciary	David Lloyd Jones, Lord Lloyd-Jones	7 November 2012; 12 February 2013	Lord Justice of Appeal (2012–2017); Justice of the Supreme Court of the United Kingdom (2017–present)
Other politician	Elfyn Llwyd	9 February 2011; 16 March 2011	Leader of Plaid Cymru in the UK Parliament (2001–2015)
HM judiciary	Andrew Longmore	14 March 2001	Lord Justice of Appeal (2001–2019)
Royal Family/ Household	Richard Luce, Baron Luce	1986	Minister for the Arts (1985–1990); Governor of Gibraltar (1997–2000); Lord Chamberlain (2000–2006)
Civil Service	Roderic Lyne	8 July 2009; 17 November 2009	Member of the Iraq inquiry (2009–2011)
Labour politician	Ian McCartney	10 March 1999	Minister at the Cabinet Office (1999–2001); Minister for Pensions (2001–2003); Minister without portfolio and Chair of the Labour Party (2003–2006); Minister of State for Trade (2006–2007)
HM judiciary	Bernard McCloskey	8 October 2019; 12 February 2020	Lord Justice of Appeal, Northern Ireland (2019–present)
HM judiciary	Richard McCombe	12 December 2012; 12 February 2013	Lord Justice of Appeal (2012–2021)
Labour politician	Jack McConnell, Baron McConnell of Glenscorrodale	11 December 2001; 12 February 2002	First Minister of Scotland (2001–2007); Leader of the Scottish Labour Party (2001–2007)
Labour politician	Gus Macdonald, Baron Macdonald of Tradeston	30 July 1999; 16 October 1999	Minister of State for Transport (1999–2001); Minister for the Cabinet Office and Chancellor of the Duchy of Lancaster (2001–2003)
Labour politician	John McDonnell	12 October 2016; 16 November 2016	Shadow Chancellor of the Exchequer (2015–2020)
Labour politician	Pat McFadden	5 November 2008	Minister for Employment Relations and Postal Affairs (2007–2009); Minister at the Department for Business, Innovation and Skills (2009–2010); Shadow Minister for Europe (2014–2016); Shadow Economic Secretary to the Treasury (2020–2021); Shadow Chief Secretary to the Treasury (2021–2023); Shadow Chancellor of the Duchy of Lancaster (2023–2024); Chancellor of the Duchy of Lancaster and Minister for Intergovernmental Relations (2024–2025); Secretary of State for Work and Pensions (2025–present)
Other politician	John McFall, Baron McFall of Alcluith	10 June 2004; 27 July 2004	Chair of the Treasury Select Committee (2001–2010); Senior Deputy Speaker of the House of Lords (2016–2021); Lord Speaker (2021–2026)
HM judiciary	Andrew McFarlane	12 October 2011; 16 November 2011	Lord Justice of Appeal (2011–2018); President of the Family Division (2018–2026)
Conservative politician	John MacGregor, Baron MacGregor of Pulham Market	1985	Chief Secretary to the Treasury (1985–1987); Minister of Agriculture, Fisheries and Food (1987–1989); Secretary of State for Education and Science (1989–1990); Lord President of the Council and Leader of the House of Commons (1990–1992); Secretary of State for Transport (1992–1994)
Labour politician	Anne McGuire	5 November 2008; 11 February 2009	Assistant Government Whip (1998–2001); Lord Commissioner of the Treasury (2001–2002); Parliamentary Under-Secretary of State for Scotland (2002–2005); Parliamentary Under-Secretary of State for Disabled People (2005–2008); Parliamentary Private Secretary to the Leader of the Opposition (2010–2011); Shadow Minister for Disabled People (2011–2013)
Labour politician	Ken Macintosh, Baron Macintosh of Eastwood	16 November 2016	Presiding Officer of the Scottish Parliament (2016–2021)
Conservative politician	Andrew MacKay	11 February 1998	Treasurer of the Household and Deputy Government Chief Whip in the Commons (1996–1997); Shadow Secretary of State for Northern Ireland (1997–2001)
Commonwealth politician	Don McKinnon	8 April 1992	Deputy Prime Minister of New Zealand (1990–1996); Minister of Foreign Affairs (1990–1999); Commonwealth Secretary-General (2000–2008)
HM judiciary	Ranald MacLean, Lord MacLean	31 October 2001	Senator of the College of Justice, Inner House (2001–2005)
Labour politician	Henry McLeish	15 November 2000; 14 November 2001	Minister of State for Scotland (1997–1999); Minister for Enterprise and Lifelong Learning (1999–2000); First Minister of Scotland (2000–2001)
Conservative politician	Patrick McLoughlin, Baron McLoughlin	22 June 2005	Opposition Chief Whip in the Commons (2005–2010); Government Chief Whip in the Commons and Parliamentary Secretary to the Treasury (2010–2012); Secretary of State for Transport (2012–2016); Chancellor of the Duchy of Lancaster (2016–2018); Chair of the Conservative Party (2016–2018)
Lib. Dem. politician	Tom McNally, Baron McNally	16 December 2004; 9 February 2005	Liberal Democrat Leader in the House of Lords (2004–2013); Minister at the Ministry of Justice (2010–2013)
Labour politician	Tony McNulty	25 July 2007	Lord Commissioner of the Treasury (2001–2002); Parliamentary Under-Secretary of State for Transport (2003–2004); Minister of State for Immigration, Citizenship and Nationality (2005–2006); Minister for Security, Counter-Terrorism, Crime and Policing (2006–2008); Minister for Employment and Welfare Reform (2008–2009); Minister for London (2008–2009)
Conservative politician	Stephen McPartland	13 September 2022; 12 October 2022	
Labour politician	Fiona Mactaggart	19 March 2015; 30 March 2015	Long-serving MP (1997–2017)
Conservative politician	Esther McVey	5 March 2014; 7 May 2014	Minister at the Department for Work and Pensions (2013–2015); Treasurer of the Household and Government Deputy Chief Whip in the Commons (2017–2018); Secretary of State for Work and Pensions (2018); Minister of State for Housing and Planning (2019–2020); Minister without Portfolio at the Cabinet Office (2023–2024)
HM judiciary	Julia Macur	9 October 2013; 6 November 2013	Lord Justice of Appeal (2013–present); Senior Presiding Judge for England and Wales (2017–2019)
HM judiciary	Paul Maguire	10 March 2021; 10 November 2021	Lord Justice of Appeal, Northern Ireland (2021–2022)
Labour politician	Shabana Mahmood	6 July 2024	Lord Chancellor and Secretary of State for Justice (2024–2025); Home Secretary (2025–present)
Conservative politician	John Major	1987	Chief Secretary to the Treasury (1987–1989); Foreign Secretary (1989); Chancellor of the Exchequer (1989–1990); Prime Minister of the United Kingdom (1990–1997); Leader of the Opposition and Shadow Foreign Secretary (1997)
HM judiciary	Colin Campbell, Lord Malcolm	11 February 2015; 19 March 2015	Senator of the College of Justice, Inner House (2014–present)
HM judiciary	Stephen Males	13 February 2019; 13 March 2019	Lord Justice of Appeal (2019–present)
Other politician	Mark Malloch Brown, Baron Malloch-Brown	25 July 2007	Minister for Africa, Asia and the United Nations (2007–2009)
Conservative politician	Kit Malthouse	20 September 2021; 10 November 2021	Minister of State for Crime and Policing (2019–2022); Chancellor of the Duchy of Lancaster (2022); Secretary of State for Education (2022)
HM judiciary	Jonathan Mance, Baron Mance	2 June 1999; 21 July 1999	Lord Justice of Appeal (1999–2005); Lord of Appeal in Ordinary (2005–2009); Justice of the Supreme Court of the United Kingdom (2009–2017); Deputy President of the Supreme Court (2017–2018)
HM judiciary	Michael Bruce, Lord Marnoch	18 July 2001; 31 October 2001	Senator of the College of Justice, Inner House (2001–2005)
Other politician	Tricia Marwick	17 October 2012; 7 November 2012	Presiding Officer of the Scottish Parliament (2011–2016)
Conservative politician	Michael Mates	11 February 2004	Butler Review Committee (2004)
HM judiciary	Hugh Matthews, Lord Matthews	19 July 2022; 9 November 2022	Senator of the College of Justice, Inner House (2021–present)
Conservative politician	Francis Maude, Baron Maude of Horsham	1992	Financial Secretary to the Treasury (1990–1992); Shadow Secretary of State for Culture, Media and Sport (1997–1998); Shadow Chancellor of the Exchequer (1998–2000); Shadow Foreign Secretary (2000–2001); Chair of the Conservative Party (2005–2007); Shadow Chancellor of the Duchy of Lancaster and Shadow Minister for the Cabinet Office (2007–2010); Minister for the Cabinet Office and Paymaster General (2010–2015); Minister for Trade and Investment (2015–2016)
HM judiciary	Juliet May	10 December 2025	Lady Justice of Appeal (2025–present)
Conservative politician	Theresa May, Baroness May of Maidenhead	17 July 2003	Chair of the Conservative Party (2002–2003); Shadow Secretary of State for Environment and Transport (2003–2004); Shadow Secretary of State for the Family (2004–2005); Shadow Secretary of State for Culture, Media and Sport (2005); Shadow Leader of the House of Commons (2005–2009); Shadow Secretary of State for Work and Pensions (2009–2010); Minister for Women and Equalities (2010–2012); Home Secretary (2010–2016); Prime Minister of the United Kingdom (2016–2019)
Other politician	David Mellor	1990	Chief Secretary to the Treasury (1990–1992); Secretary of State for National Heritage (1992)
HM judiciary	Duncan Menzies, Lord Menzies	14 March 2012	Senator of the College of Justice, Inner House (2012–2021)
Conservative politician	Johnny Mercer	19 July 2022; 12 October 2022	Minister of State for Veterans' Affairs (2022, 2022–2024)
Labour politician	Alun Michael	29 October 1998	Deputy Home Secretary and Minister for Home Affairs (1997–1998); Secretary of State for Wales (1998–1999); First Secretary for Wales and Leader of Welsh Labour (1999–2000); Minister of State for Rural Affairs (2001–2005); Minister of State for Industry and the Regions (2005–2006); South Wales Police and Crime Commissioner (2012–2024)
Labour politician	Anneliese Midgley	21 July 2026	Labour Chief Whip in the House of Commons (2026–present); Parliamentary Secretary to the Treasury (2026–present)
Labour politician	Alan Milburn	29 October 1998	Chief Secretary to the Treasury (1998–1999); Secretary of State for Health (1999–2003); Chancellor of the Duchy of Lancaster and Minister for the Cabinet Office (2004–2005); Chair of the Social Mobility Commission (2012–2017); Chancellor of Lancaster University (2015–present)
HM judiciary	Robert Miles	10 March 2026	Lord Justice of Appeal (2025–present)
Labour politician	David Miliband	7 May 2005	Minister of State for Communities and Local Government (2005–2006); Secretary of State for Environment, Food and Rural Affairs (2006–2007); Foreign Secretary (2007–2010)
Labour politician	Ed Miliband	29 June 2007	Minister for the Cabinet Office and Chancellor of the Duchy of Lancaster (2007–2008); Secretary of State for Energy and Climate Change (2008–2010); Leader of the Opposition, Leader of the Labour Party (2010–2015); Shadow Secretary of State for Business, Energy and Industrial Strategy (2020–2021); Shadow President for COP26 (2021–2022); Shadow Secretary of State for Climate Change and Net Zero (2021–2024); Secretary of State for Energy Security and Net Zero (2024–2026); Foreign Secretary (2026–present)
Conservative politician	Maria Miller	10 September 2012	Secretary of State for Culture, Media and Sport (2012–2014); Minister for Women and Equalities (2012–2014)
Conservative politician	Amanda Milling	19 February 2020	Chair of the Conservative Party and Minister without Portfolio (2020–2021); Minister of State for Asia (2021–2022); Lord Commissioner of the Treasury (2023–2024)
Conservative politician	Anne Milton	19 March 2015	Vice Chamberlain of the Household (2014–2015); Deputy Chief Whip and Treasurer of the Household (2015–2017); Minister of State for Skills (2017–2019)
Conservative politician	Andrew Mitchell	13 May 2010	Secretary of State for International Development (2010–2012); Government Chief Whip in the Commons and Parliamentary Secretary to the Treasury (2012); Minister of State for Development and Africa (2022–2024); Deputy Foreign Secretary (2024); Shadow Secretary of State for Foreign, Commonwealth and Development Affairs (2024)
Commonwealth politician	Keith Mitchell	10 March 2004 (app.)	Prime Minister of Grenada (1995–2008 and 2013–2022)
Lib. Dem. politician	Michael Moore	9 June 2010	Secretary of State for Scotland (2010–2013)
HM judiciary	Martin Moore-Bick	7 June 2005; 22 June 2005	Lord Justice of Appeal (2005–2016)
Conservative politician	Penny Mordaunt	15 November 2017	Secretary of State for International Development (2017–2019); Secretary of State for Defence (2019); Paymaster General (2020–2021); Minister of State for Trade (2021–2022); Lord President of the Council and Leader of the House of Commons (2022–2024)
HM judiciary	Declan Morgan	9 December 2009; 10 February 2010	Lord Chief Justice of Northern Ireland (2009–2021)
Conservative politician	Nicky Morgan, Baroness Morgan of Cotes	15 April 2014; 27 May 2014	Minister for Women and Equalities (2014–2016); Secretary of State for Education (2014–2016); Chair of the Treasury Select Committee (2017–2019); Secretary of State for Digital, Culture, Media and Sport (2019–2020)
Labour politician	Eluned Morgan, Baroness Morgan of Ely	2 October 2024	First Minister of Wales (2024–2026)
Labour politician	Estelle Morris, Baroness Morris of Yardley	12 October 1999	Minister in the Department for Education and Employment (1997–2001); Secretary of State for Education and Skills (2001–2002); Minister for the Arts (2003–2005)
HM judiciary	Andrew Morritt	2 November 1994; 24 November 1994	Lord Justice of Appeal (1994–2000); Vice Chancellor (2000–2005); Chancellor of the High Court (2005–2013)
Conservative politician	Wendy Morton	13 September 2022	Government Chief Whip in the Commons and Parliamentary Secretary to the Treasury (2022); Shadow Cabinet Minister for International Development (2024–present)
HM judiciary	Alan Moses	15 November 2005	Lord Justice of Appeal (2005–2014)
HM judiciary	Andrew Moylan	11 October 2017; 15 November 2017	Lord Justice of Appeal (2017–present)
HM judiciary	Frank Mulholland, Lord Mulholland	13 July 2011; 12 October 2011	Lord Advocate (2011–2016)
Clergy	Sarah Mullally	14 March 2018	Bishop of London (2018–2026); Archbishop of Canterbury (2026–present)
HM judiciary	John Mummery	15 October 1996; 19 December 1996	Lord Justice of Appeal (1996–2013)
Conservative politician	David Mundell	9 June 2010; 21 July 2010	Parliamentary Under-Secretary of State at the Scotland Office (2010–2015); Secretary of State for Scotland (2015–2019)
Labour politician	Jim Murphy	9 October 2008	Secretary of State for Scotland (2008–2010); Shadow Secretary of State for Defence (2010–2013); Shadow Secretary of State for International Development (2013–2014); Leader of the Scottish Labour Party (2014–2015)
Labour politician	Paul Murphy, Baron Murphy of Torfaen	10 February 1999	Secretary of State for Wales (1999–2002 and 2008–2009); Secretary of State for Northern Ireland (2002–2005); Chair of the Intelligence and Security Committee (2005–2008)
Conservative politician	Andrew Murrison	22 May 2019	Minister of State for the Middle East and for International Development (2019–2020); Parliamentary Under Secretary of State for Defence People and Families (2022–2024)
Labour politician	Ian Murray	10 July 2024	Secretary of State for Scotland (2024–2025); Minister of State for Creative Industries, Media and Arts (2025–present); Minister of State for Digital Government and Data (2025–present)
Labour politician	James Murray	10 September 2025	Chief Secretary to the Treasury (2025–2026); Secretary of State for Health and Social Care (2026); Financial Secretary to the Treasury and Paymaster General (2026–present)
Commonwealth politician	Said Musa	12 October 2005 (app.)	Prime Minister of Belize (1998–2008)
Labour politician	Lisa Nandy	6 July 2024	Secretary of State for Digital, Culture, Media and Sport (2024–present)
Labour politician	Kanishka Narayan	21 July 2026	Minister for Artificial Intelligence (2026–present)
Conservative politician	Michael Morris, Baron Naseby	1994	Chairman of Ways and Means (1992–1997)
Conservative politician	Richard Needham, 6th Earl of Kilmorey	1994	Minister of State for Trade (1992–1995)
HM judiciary	David Neuberger, Baron Neuberger of Abbotsbury	11 February 2004; 6 May 2004	Lord Justice of Appeal (2004–2007); Lord of Appeal in Ordinary (2007–2009); Master of the Rolls (2009–2012); President of the Supreme Court (2012–2017)
Conservative politician	Pauline Neville-Jones, Baroness Neville-Jones	9 June 2010	Minister for Security (2010–2011)
Lib. Dem. politician	Richard Newby, Baron Newby	5 March 2014	Liberal Democrats Chief Whip in the House of Lords (2012–2016); Leader of the Liberal Democrats in the House of Lords (2016–present)
HM judiciary	Guy Newey	15 November 2017; 14 March 2018	Lord Justice of Appeal (2017–present)
HM judiciary	William Nimmo Smith, Lord Nimmo Smith	7 June 2005	Senator of the College of Justice, Inner House (2005–2009)
Conservative politician	Caroline Nokes	11 January 2018; 14 March 2018	Minister of State for Immigration (2018–2019); Deputy Speaker of the House of Commons (2024–present)
Conservative politician	Jesse Norman	6 November 2019; 12 February 2020	Financial Secretary to the Treasury (2019–2021); Minister of State for the Americas (2022); Minister of State for Decarbonisation and Technology (2022–2023); Shadow Leader of the House of Commons (2024–present)
Labour politician	Alex Norris	21 July 2026	Lord Chancellor and Secretary of State for Justice (2026–present)
Lib. Dem. politician	Lindsay Northover, Baroness Northover	19 March 2015; 30 March 2015	Parliamentary Under-Secretary of State for International Development (2014–2015)
HM judiciary	Christopher Nugee	11 November 2020; 28 April 2021	High Court Judge (2013–2020); Lord Justice of Appeal (2020–present)
Labour politician	Mike O'Brien	12 June 2009; 8 July 2009	Parliamentary Under-Secretary of State for Immigration (1997–2001); Parliamentary Under-Secretary of State for Foreign Affairs (2002–2003); Minister of State for Trade (2003–2004); Minister of State for Trade and Industry (2004–2005); Solicitor General for England and Wales (2005–2007); Minister of State for Pensions (2007–2008); Minister of State for Energy and Climate Change (2008–2009); Minister of State for Health Services (2009–2010)
Conservative politician	Stephen O'Brien	13 March 2013; 15 May 2013	Parliamentary Under-Secretary of State at the Department for International Development (2010–2012); United Nations Under-Secretary-General for Humanitarian Affairs and Emergency Relief Coordinator (2015–2017)
Conservative politician	George Osborne	13 May 2010	Chancellor of the Exchequer (2010–2016)
HM judiciary	Kenneth Osborne, Lord Osborne	18 July 2001; 31 October 2001	Senator of the College of Justice, Inner House (2001–2011)
Conservative politician	Richard Ottaway	9 October 2013; 6 November 2013	Long-serving MP (1983–1987 and 1992–2015)
Other politician	David Owen, Baron Owen	1976	Minister of State at the Foreign Office (1976–1977); Foreign Secretary (1979–1979); Leader of the Social Democratic Party (1983–1987); Leader of the 'continuing' Social Democratic Party (1988–1990)
Commonwealth politician	Bikenibeu Paeniu	1991	Prime Minister of Tuvalu (1989–1993 and 1996–1999)
Conservative politician	Jim Paice	15 December 2010; 16 March 2011	Minister of State for Agriculture and Food (2010–2012)
Commonwealth politician	Geoffrey Palmer	23 December 1985	Deputy Prime Minister of New Zealand (1984–1989); Prime Minister of New Zealand (1989–1990)
Civil Service	Janet Paraskeva	21 July 2010; 10 November 2010	Member of the Torture inquiry (2010–2013)
HM judiciary	Jonathan Parker	11 September 2000; 15 November 2000	Lord Justice of Appeal (2000–2007)
Royal Family/ Household	Andrew Parker, Baron Parker of Minsmere	28 April 2021; 16 February 2022	Lord Chamberlain (2021–2024)
Conservative politician	Priti Patel	14 May 2015	Minister for Employment (2015–2016); Secretary of State for International Development (2016–2017); Home Secretary (2019–2022); Shadow Foreign Secretary (2024–2026)
Conservative politician	Owen Paterson	13 May 2010	Secretary of State for Northern Ireland (2010–2012); Secretary of State for Environment, Food and Rural Affairs (2012–2014)
HM judiciary	Ann Paton, Lady Paton	10 October 2007	Senator of the College of Justice, Inner House (2007–present)
Conservative politician	Chris Patten, Baron Patten of Barnes	1989	Secretary of State for the Environment (1989–1990); Chancellor of the Duchy of Lancaster (1990–1992); Governor of Hong Kong (1992–1997); European Commissioner for External Relations (1999–2004)
Conservative politician	John Patten, Baron Patten	1990	Parliamentary Under-Secretary of State for Home Affairs (1987–1992); Secretary of State for Education (1992–1994)
HM judiciary	Nicholas Patten	8 July 2009; 17 November 2009	Lord Justice of Appeal (2009–2020)
Royal Family/ Household	William Peel, 3rd Earl Peel	14 November 2006	Lord Chamberlain (2006–2021)
Conservative politician	Mike Penning	5 March 2014	Minister of State at the Department for Work and Pensions (2013–2014); Minister of State at the Ministry of Justice (2014–2016); Minister of State for the Armed Forces (2016–2017)
Labour politician	Matthew Pennycook	21 July 2026	Minister of State for Housing and Planning (2024–present)
HM judiciary	Paul Cullen, Lord Pentland	2 September 2020; 28 April 2021	Senator of the College of Justice, Inner House (2020–2025); Lord President of the Court of Session and Lord Justice General (2025–present)
Commonwealth judiciary	Janice Pereira	2 October 2024 (app.)	Chief Justice of the Eastern Caribbean Supreme Court (2012–2024)
Other politician	Claire Perry O'Neill	11 January 2018; 14 March 2018	Minister of State for Energy and Clean Growth (2017–2019)
Commonwealth politician	Winston Peters	21 May 1998	Deputy Prime Minister of New Zealand (1996–1998, 2017–2020 and 2023–2025); Treasurer of New Zealand (1996–1998); Minister of Foreign Affairs (2005–2008, 2017–2020 and 2023–present)
HM judiciary	Alexander Philip, Lord Philip	15 November 2005; 14 February 2006	Senator of the College of Justice, Inner House (2005–2007)
Conservative politician	Chris Philp	13 September 2022; 12 October 2022	Chief Secretary to the Treasury (2022); Minister for the Cabinet Office and Paymaster General (2022); Minister of State for Crime, Policing and Fire (2022–2024); Shadow Leader of the House of Commons (2024); Shadow Home Secretary (2024–present)
HM judiciary	Stephen Phillips	12 February 2020; 11 March 2020	Lord Justice of Appeal (2020–present)
HM judiciary	Nicholas Phillips, Baron Phillips of Worth Matravers	23 November 1995	Lord Justice of Appeal (1995–1999); Lord of Appeal in Ordinary (1999–2000); Master of the Rolls (2000–2005); Lord Chief Justice of England and Wales (2005–2008); Senior Lord of Appeal in Ordinary (2008–2009); President of the Supreme Court (2009–2012)
Labour politician	Bridget Phillipson	10 July 2024	Secretary of State for Education (2024–2026); Minister for Women and Equalities (2024–present); Chair of the Labour Party (2026–present)
Conservative politician	Eric Pickles, Baron Pickles	13 May 2010	Secretary of State for Communities and Local Government (2010–2015)
HM judiciary	Malcolm Pill	8 February 1995	Lord Justice of Appeal (1995–2013)
Conservative politician	Chris Pincher	12 December 2018; 13 February 2019	Treasurer of the Household and Government Deputy Chief Whip in the Commons (2018–2019 and 2022); Minister of State for Europe and the Americas (2019–2020); Minister of State for Housing (2020–2022)
HM judiciary	Andrew Popplewell	17 December 2019; 11 March 2020	Lord Justice of Appeal (2019–present)
Conservative politician	Michael Portillo	1992	Chief Secretary to the Treasury (1992–1994); Secretary of State for Employment (1994–1995); Secretary of State for Defence (1995–1997); Shadow Chancellor of the Exchequer (2000–2001)
HM judiciary	Mark Potter	26 June 1996; 23 July 1996	Lord Justice of Appeal (1996–2005); President of the Family Division (2005–2010)
Labour politician	Lucy Powell	6 July 2024	Lord President of the Council and Leader of the House of Commons (2024–2025); Deputy Leader of the Labour Party (2025–present); Secretary of State for Education (2026–present)
Other politician	Usha Prashar, Baroness Prashar	8 July 2009; 15 October 2009	Member of the Iraq Inquiry; Chair of the Judicial Appointments Commission (2006–2011)
Conservative politician	Victoria Prentis, Baroness Prentis of Banbury	27 October 2022; 14 December 2022	Attorney General for England and Wales (2022–2024)
Labour politician	Dawn Primarolo, Baroness Primarolo	26 June 2002; 16 July 2002	Paymaster General (1999–2007); Minister for Public Health (2007–2009); Minister for Children, Young People and Families (2009–2010); Deputy Speaker of the House of Commons (2010–2015)
Conservative politician	Mark Pritchard	10 March 2021; 21 July 2021	Long-serving MP (2005–present)
Commonwealth politician	Tomasi Puapua	1982	Prime Minister of Tuvalu (1981–1989); Governor-General of Tuvalu (1998–2003)
Labour politician	James Purnell	28 June 2007	Secretary of State for Culture, Media and Sport (2007–2008); Secretary of State for Work and Pensions (2008–2009)
Conservative politician	Jeremy Quin	27 October 2022; 9 November 2022	Minister for the Cabinet Office and Paymaster General (2022–2023)
Labour politician	Joyce Quin, Baroness Quin	29 October 1998; 16 December 1998	Minister of State for Europe (1998–1999)
Conservative politician	Dominic Raab	11 July 2018	Secretary of State for Exiting the European Union (2018); Foreign Secretary and First Secretary of State (2019–2021); Deputy Prime Minister, Lord Chancellor and Secretary of State for Justice (2021–2022, 2022–2023)
HM judiciary	Anne Rafferty	12 October 2011; 16 November 2011	Lady Justice of Appeal (2011–2020)
Conservative politician	John Randall, Baron Randall of Uxbridge	9 June 2010; 13 October 2010	Treasurer of the Household and Deputy Chief Whip (2010–2013)
Labour politician	Angela Rayner	10 March 2021; 21 July 2021	Chair of the Labour Party (2020–2021); Deputy Leader of the Labour Party (2020–2025); Shadow First Secretary of State and Deputy Leader of the Opposition (2020–2024); Shadow Secretary of State for Levelling Up, Housing and Communities (2023–2024); Shadow Deputy Prime Minister of the United Kingdom (2023–2024); Deputy Prime Minister of the United Kingdom (2024–2025); Secretary of State for Housing, Communities and Local Government (2024–2025, 2026–present)
Labour politician	Nick Raynsford	7 February 2001; 14 March 2001	Minister for Local Government (2001–2005); Minister for London (2001–2003); Minister in the Deputy Prime Minister's Office (2002–2005)
Conservative politician	John Redwood, Baron Redwood	1993	Secretary of State for Wales (1993–1995); Shadow Secretary of State for Trade and Industry (1997–1999); Shadow Secretary of State for the Environment, Transport and the Regions (1999–2000); Shadow Secretary of State for Deregulation (2005)
HM judiciary	Robert Reed, Baron Reed of Allermuir	30 January 2008; 12 February 2008	Senator of the College of Justice, Inner House (2008–2012); Justice of the Supreme Court of the United Kingdom (2012–2018); Deputy President of the Supreme Court (2018–2020); President of the Supreme Court (2020–present)
Labour politician	Steve Reed	10 July 2024	Secretary of State for Environment, Food and Rural Affairs (2024–2025); Secretary of State for Housing, Communities and Local Government (2025–2026)
Conservative politician	Jacob Rees-Mogg	25 July 2019	Lord President of the Council and Leader of the House of Commons (2019–2022); Minister of State for Brexit Opportunities and Government Efficiency (2022); Secretary of State for Business, Energy and Industrial Strategy (2022)
Labour politician	Ellie Reeves	2 April 2025; 6 May 2025	Chair of the Labour Party and Minister without Portfolio (2024–2025); Solicitor General for England and Wales (2025–2026); Attorney General for England and Wales (2026–present)
Labour politician	Rachel Reeves	9 November 2022; 14 December 2022	Shadow Chancellor of the Exchequer (2021–2024); Chancellor of the Exchequer (2024–2026)
Labour politician	John Reid, Baron Reid of Cardowan	29 July 1998	Minister of State for Transport (1998–1999); Secretary of State for Scotland (1999–2001); Secretary of State for Northern Ireland (2001–2002); Minister without portfolio and Chair of the Labour Party (2002–2003); Leader of the House of Commons and Lord President of the Council (2003); Secretary of State for Health (2003–2005); Secretary of State for Defence (2005–2006); Home Secretary (2006–2007)
Labour politician	Emma Reynolds	10 September 2025	Secretary of State for Environment, Food and Rural Affairs (2025–2026); Chief Secretary to the Treasury (2026–present)
Labour politician	Jonathan Reynolds	10 July 2024	Secretary of State for Business, Innovation, Science and Trade and President of the Board of Trade (2024–2025, 2026–present); Labour Chief Whip in the House of Commons (2025–2026); Parliamentary Secretary to the Treasury (2025–2026)
HM judiciary	David Richards, Lord Richards of Camberwell	4 May 2016; 13 July 2016	Lord Justice of Appeal (2015–2021); Justice of the Supreme Court of the United Kingdom (2022–present)
HM judiciary	Stephen Richards	15 November 2005	Lord Justice of Appeal (2005–2016)
Civil Service	Peter Riddell	21 July 2010; 10 November 2010	Member of the Detainee Inquiry (2010–2011)
Conservative politician	Malcolm Rifkind	1986	Secretary of State for Scotland (1986–1990); Secretary of State for Transport (1990–1992); Secretary of State for Defence (1992–1995); Foreign Secretary (1995–1997); Shadow Secretary of State for Work and Pensions (2005); Chair of the Intelligence and Security Committee (2010–2015)
Labour politician	Lucy Rigby	8 July 2026	Chief Secretary to the Treasury (2026); Economic Secretary to the Treasury and City Minister (2026–present)
HM judiciary	Colin Rimer	14 November 2007	Lord Justice of Appeal (2007–2014)
HM judiciary	Bernard Rix	14 June 2000; 12 July 2000	Lord Justice of Appeal (2000–2013)
Conservative politician	Andrew Robathan, Baron Robathan	15 December 2010; 9 February 2011	Parliamentary Under-Secretary of State at the Ministry of Defence (2010–2012); Minister of State for the Armed Forces (2012–2013); Minister at the Northern Ireland Office (2013–2014)
Other politician	Angus Robertson	10 September 2015; 8 October 2015	SNP Westminster Group Leader (2007–2017); Depute Leader of the SNP (2016–2018); Cabinet Secretary for the Constitution, External Affairs and Culture in the Scottish Government (2021–2026)
Labour politician	George Robertson, Baron Robertson of Port Ellen	1997	Secretary of State for Defence (1997–1999); Secretary General of NATO (1999–2003)
Conservative politician	Hugh Robertson	10 September 2012; 17 October 2012	Minister of State for Sport (2010–2013); Minister of State at the Foreign and Commonwealth Office (2013–2014)
Other politician	Gavin Robinson	10 April 2024; 22 May 2024	Deputy Leader of the Democratic Unionist Party (2023–2024); Leader of the Democratic Unionist Party in the House of Commons (2024–present); Leader of the Democratic Unionist Party (2024–present)
Other politician	Peter Robinson	15 May 2007	Deputy Leader of the Democratic Unionist Party (1980–2008); First Minister of Northern Ireland (2008–2016); Leader of the Democratic Unionist Party (2008–2015)
Lib. Dem. politician	Bill Rodgers, Baron Rodgers of Quarry Bank	1975	Secretary of State for Transport (1976–1979); Shadow Secretary of State for Defence (1979–1980); Leader of the Liberal Democrats in the House of Lords (1997–2001)
Labour politician	Jeff Rooker, Baron Rooker	24 November 1999	Minister at the Ministry of Agriculture, Fisheries and Food (1997–1999); Minister at the Department of Social Security (1999–2001); Minister of State for Immigration (2001–2002); Minister of State for Housing and Planning (2002–2003); Minister for Children in Northern Ireland (2005–2006); Minister at the Department for Environment, Food and Rural Affairs (2006–2008)
HM judiciary	Christopher Rose	1992	Lord Justice of Appeal (1992–2006); Chief Surveillance Commissioner (2006–2015)
HM judiciary	Vivien Rose, Lady Rose of Colmworth	13 February 2019; 13 March 2019	Lady Justice of Appeal (2018–2021); Justice of the Supreme Court of the United Kingdom (2021–present)
Labour politician	Janet Royall, Baroness Royall of Blaisdon	30 January 2008; 12 March 2008	Government Chief Whip in the Lords and Captain of the Gentlemen-at-Arms (2008); Leader of the House of Lords (2008–2010); Lord President of the Council (2008–2009); Chancellor of the Duchy of Lancaster (2009–2010); Leader of the Opposition in the House of Lords (2010–2015)
Conservative politician	Amber Rudd	14 May 2015	Secretary of State for Energy and Climate Change (2015–2016); Home Secretary (2016–2018); Secretary of State for Work and Pensions (2018–2019)
Labour politician	Joan Ruddock	9 June 2010; 13 October 2010	Minister of State for Energy (2009–2010)
Other politician	Joan Ryan	25 July 2007	Special Representative to Cyprus (2007–2008)
HM judiciary	Ernest Ryder	15 May 2013; 13 June 2013	Lord Justice of Appeal (2013–2020); Senior President of Tribunals (2015–2020)
Conservative politician	Richard Ryder, Baron Ryder of Wensum	1990	Government Chief Whip in the Commons and Parliamentary Secretary to the Treasury (1990–1995)
Conservative politician	Tim Sainsbury	1992	Minister of State for Trade (1990–1992); Minister for Industry (1992–1994)
HM judiciary	Philip Sales, Lord Sales	10 December 2014; 19 March 2015	Lord Justice of Appeal (2014–2019); Justice of the Supreme Court of the United Kingdom (2019–present)
Conservative politician	Robert Gascoyne-Cecil, 7th Marquess of Salisbury	1994	Leader of the House of Lords and Lord Privy Seal (1994–1997); Leader of the Opposition in the House of Lords (1997–1998)
HM judiciary	Mark Saville, Baron Saville of Newdigate	1994	Lord Justice of Appeal (1994–1997); Lord of Appeal in Ordinary (1997–2009); Justice of the Supreme Court of the United Kingdom (2009–2010); Bloody Sunday Inquiry (1998–2010)
Other politician	Liz Saville Roberts	13 March 2019	Leader of Plaid Cymru in the House of Commons (2017–present)
Commonwealth judiciary	Joan Sawyer	27 July 2004; 12 October 2005	President of the Court of Appeal of the Bahamas (2001–2010)
HM judiciary	Konrad Schiemann	17 May 1995	Lord Justice of Appeal (1995–2003); Judge at the European Court of Justice (2004–2012)
Labour politician	Patricia Scotland, Baroness Scotland of Asthal	18 July 2001	Attorney General (2004–2010); Commonwealth Secretary-General (2016–2025)
HM judiciary	Richard Scott, Baron Scott of Foscote	1991	Lord Justice of Appeal (1991–1994); Vice Chancellor (1994–2000); Lord of Appeal in Ordinary (2000–2009)
HM judiciary	Stephen Sedley	10 February 1999	Lord Justice of Appeal (1999–2011)
Clergy	John Sentamu, Baron Sentamu	15 November 2005	Archbishop of York (2005–2020)
Conservative politician	Grant Shapps	9 June 2010; 21 July 2010	Minister of State for Housing and Local Government (2010–2012); Minister without Portfolio and Chair of the Conservative Party (2012–2015); Minister of State at both DfID and FCO (2015); Secretary of State for Transport (2019–2022); Home Secretary (2022); Secretary of State for Business, Energy and Industrial Strategy (2022–2023); Secretary of State for Energy Security and Net Zero (2023); Secretary of State for Defence (2023–2024)
Conservative politician	Alok Sharma, Baron Sharma	25 July 2019	Secretary of State for International Development (2019–2020); Secretary of State for Business, Energy and Industrial Strategy (2020–2021); President for COP26 (2021–2022)
HM judiciary	Victoria Sharp	6 November 2013; 11 February 2014	Lady Justice of Appeal (2013–2019); President of the King's Bench Division (2019–present)
HM judiciary	John Sheil	16 December 2004; 9 February 2005	Lord Justice of Appeal, Northern Ireland (2004–2006)
Conservative politician	Alec Shelbrooke	8 October 2019; 6 November 2019	MP (2010–present); Minister of State for Defence Procurement (2022); Shadow Minister for Transport (2024)
Conservative politician	Gillian Shephard, Baroness Shephard of Northwold	1992	Secretary of State for Employment (1992–1993); Minister of Agriculture, Fisheries and Food (1993–1994); Secretary of State for Education (1994–1997); Shadow Leader of the House of Commons (1997–1998); Shadow Secretary of State for Environment, Transport and the Regions (1998–1999)
Commonwealth politician	Jenny Shipley	21 May 1998	Prime Minister of New Zealand (1997–1999); Leader of the Opposition (1999–2001)
Labour politician	Clare Short	1997	Secretary of State for International Development (1997–2003)
HM judiciary	Ingrid Simler, Lady Simler	10 July 2019; 12 February 2020	Lady Justice of Appeal (2019–2023); Justice of the Supreme Court of the United Kingdom (2023–present)
Commonwealth politician	Kennedy Simmonds	1984	Prime Minister of Saint Kitts and Nevis (1983–1995)
Conservative politician	Mark Simmonds	10 December 2014	Parliamentary Under Secretary of State for Foreign and Commonwealth Affairs (2012–2014)
HM judiciary	Peregrine Simon	11 November 2015	Lord Justice of Appeal (2015–2020)
Conservative politician	Keith Simpson	19 March 2015	Long-serving MP (1997–2019)
Commonwealth politician	Ian Sinclair	1977	Australian government minister (1965–1972 and 1975–1983)
HM judiciary	Rabinder Singh	15 November 2017; 14 March 2018	Lord Justice of Appeal (2017–present)
Conservative politician	Chris Skidmore	8 October 2019; 6 November 2019	Minister of State for Universities, Science, Research and Innovation (2019–2020)
Commonwealth judiciary	Anthony Smellie	5 February 2025; 9 July 2025	Justice of Appeal of the Court of Appeal of Bermuda (2018–present); Justice of Appeal of the Court of Appeal of the Cayman Islands (2023–present)
Labour politician	Andrew Smith	20 May 1997	Minister for Employment (1997–1999); Chief Secretary to the Treasury (1999–2002); Secretary of State for Work and Pensions (2002–2004)
Labour politician	Angela Smith, Baroness Smith of Basildon	12 June 2009; 8 July 2009	Parliamentary Secretary at the Cabinet Office (2009–2010); Opposition Deputy Chief Whip in House of Lords (2012–2015); Leader of the Opposition in the House of Lords (2015–2024); Leader of the House of Lords and Lord Privy Seal (2024–present)
HM judiciary	Anne Smith, Lady Smith	12 February 2013; 13 June 2013	Senator of the College of Justice, Inner House (2012–present)
Conservative politician	Chloe Smith	13 September 2022	Secretary of State for Work and Pensions (2022); Acting Secretary of State for Science, Innovation and Technology (2023)
Labour politician	Chris Smith, Baron Smith of Finsbury	1997	Secretary of State for Culture, Media and Sport (1997–2001)
Labour politician	Jacqui Smith, Baroness Smith of Malvern	8 October 2003; 11 February 2004	Deputy Minister for Women (2003–2005); Minister of State for Schools (2005–2006); Government Chief Whip in the Commons and Parliamentary Secretary to the Treasury (2006–2007); Home Secretary (2007–2009); Minister of State for Skills (2024–present); Minister of State for Women and Equalities (2025–2026)
HM judiciary	Janet Smith	17 December 2002; 27 February 2003	Lady Justice of Appeal (2002–2011)
Conservative politician	Julian Smith	6 November 2017; 15 November 2017	Government Chief Whip in the Commons and Parliamentary Secretary to the Treasury (2017–2019); Secretary of State for Northern Ireland (2019–2020)
HM judiciary	Richard Snowden, Lord Snowden of Redcar	15 December 2021; 16 February 2022	Lord Justice of Appeal (2021–2026); Justice of the Supreme Court of the United Kingdom (2026–present)
Conservative politician	Nicholas Soames, Baron Soames of Fletching	13 July 2011	Parliamentary Secretary at the Ministry of Agriculture, Fisheries and Food (1992–1994); Minister of State for the Armed Forces (1994–1997); Shadow Secretary of State for Defence (2003–2005)
Commonwealth politician	Enele Sopoaga	14 March 2018 (app.)	Prime Minister of Tuvalu (2013–2019)
Other politician	Anna Soubry	14 May 2015	Minister for Small Business (2015–2016)
Labour politician	John Spellar, Baron Spellar	18 July 2001	Minister of State for Transport (2001–2003); Minister of State at the Northern Ireland Office (2003–2005); Government Deputy Chief Whip in the House of Commons (2008–2010); Shadow Minister at the Foreign and Commonwealth Office (2010–2015)
Conservative politician	Caroline Spelman	13 May 2010	Secretary of State for Environment, Food and Rural Affairs (2010–2012); Second Church Estates Commissioner (2015–2019)
Conservative politician	Mark Spencer	25 July 2019; 8 October 2019	Government Chief Whip in the Commons and Parliamentary Secretary to the Treasury (2019–2022); Lord President of the Council and Leader of the House of Commons (2022); Minister of State for Food, Farming and Fisheries (2022–2024)
Labour politician	Keir Starmer	19 July 2017	Shadow Secretary of State for Exiting the European Union (2016–2020); Leader of the Opposition (2020–2024); Prime Minister of the United Kingdom (2024–2026)
Other politician	David Steel, Baron Steel of Aikwood	1977	Leader of the Liberal Party (1976–1988); Leader of the Liberal Democrats (1988); Presiding Officer of the Scottish Parliament (1999–2003)
HM judiciary	Ben Stephens, Lord Stephens of Creevyloughgare	11 October 2017; 15 November 2017	Lord Justice of Appeal, Northern Ireland (2017–2020); Justice of the Supreme Court of the United Kingdom (2020–present)
Conservative politician	Andrew Stephenson	8 July 2022; 19 July 2022	Chair of the Conservative Party and Minister without portfolio (2022); Parliamentary Under-Secretary of State for Housing and Rough Sleeping (2022); Lord Commissioner of the Treasury (2022–2023); Minister of State for Health and Secondary Care (2023–2024)
Labour politician	Jo Stevens	10 July 2024	Secretary of State for Wales (2024–2026)
Conservative politician	Bob Stewart	10 March 2021; 15 December 2021	MP (2010–present)
Other politician	Rory Stewart	3 May 2019	Secretary of State for International Development (2019)
Conservative politician	Tina Stowell, Baroness Stowell of Beeston	16 July 2014	Leader of the House of Lords and Lord Privy Seal (2014–2016)
Labour politician	Gavin Strang	1997	Minister of State for Transport (1997–1998)
Conservative politician	Thomas Galbraith, 2nd Baron Strathclyde	28 June 1995	Government Chief Whip in the Lords (1995–1997); Opposition Chief Whip in the Lords (1997–1998); Leader of the Opposition in the Lords (1998–2010); Leader of the House of Lords and Chancellor of the Duchy of Lancaster (2010–2013)
Labour politician	Jack Straw	1997	Home Secretary (1997–2001); Foreign Secretary (2001–2006); Leader of the House of Commons (2006–2007); Lord Chancellor and Secretary of State for Justice (2007–2010); Acting Shadow Deputy Prime Minister, Shadow Lord Chancellor and Shadow Secretary of State for Justice (2010)
Labour politician	Wes Streeting	10 July 2024	Secretary of State for Health and Social Care (2024–2026); Secretary of State for Defence (2026–present)
Conservative politician	Mel Stride	3 May 2017; 14 June 2017	Financial Secretary to the Treasury and Paymaster General (2017–2019); Lord President of the Council and Leader of the House of Commons (2019); Chair of the Treasury Select Committee (2019–2022); Secretary of State for Work and Pensions (2022–2024); Shadow Secretary of State for Work and Pensions (2024); Shadow Chancellor of the Exchequer (2024–2026)
Commonwealth politician	Freundel Stuart	11 December 2013 (app.)	Prime Minister of Barbados (2010–2018)
Other politician	Gisela Stuart, Baroness Stuart of Edgbaston	10 September 2015; 8 October 2015	Long-serving MP (1997–2017)
Conservative politician	Graham Stuart	13 September 2022; 12 October 2022	Minister of State for Energy and Climate (2022–2024)
HM judiciary	Jeremy Stuart-Smith	11 November 2020; 23 June 2021	Lord Justice of Appeal (2020–present)
Other politician	Nicola Sturgeon	10 December 2014	First Minister of Scotland (2014–2023)
HM judiciary	Jeremy Sullivan	11 February 2009; 18 March 2009	Lord Justice of Appeal (2009–2015); Senior President of Tribunals (2012–2015)
HM judiciary	Jonathan Sumption, Lord Sumption	14 December 2011; 15 February 2012	Justice of the Supreme Court of the United Kingdom (2012–2018)
Conservative politician	Rishi Sunak	25 July 2019; 6 November 2019	Chief Secretary to the Treasury (2019–2020); Chancellor of the Exchequer (2020–2022); Prime Minister of the United Kingdom (2022–2024); Leader of the Opposition (2024)
Conservative politician	Desmond Swayne	13 July 2011	Parliamentary Private Secretary to the Prime Minister (2010–2012); Lord Commissioner of HM Treasury (2012–2013); Vice Chamberlain of the Household (2013–2014); Minister for International Development (2014–2016)
Other politician	John Swinney	10 July 2024; 2 October 2024	First Minister of Scotland (2024–present)
Conservative politician	Hugo Swire, Baron Swire	15 December 2010; 9 February 2011	Minister of State at the Northern Ireland Office (2010–2012); Minister of State at the Foreign and Commonwealth Office (2012–2016)
Labour politician	Elizabeth Symons, Baroness Symons of Vernham Dean	7 February 2001; 14 March 2001	Minister of State for Trade (2001–2003); Minister of State at the Foreign Office (2003–2005); Deputy Leader of the House of Lords (2003–2005)
Labour politician	Mark Tami	12 December 2018; 13 February 2019	Long-serving MP (2001–present); Opposition Pairing Whip (2010–2023); Opposition Deputy Chief Whip (2023–2024); Government Deputy Chief Whip in the Commons and Treasurer of the Household (2024–present)
Labour politician	Ann Taylor, Baroness Taylor of Bolton	1997	Leader of the House of Commons and Lord President of the Council (1997–1998); Government Chief Whip in the Commons and Parliamentary Secretary to the Treasury (1998–2001); Chair of the Intelligence and Security Committee (2001–2005); Minister for Defence Equipment, Support and Technology (2007–2008); Minister for International Defence and Security (2008–2010)
Conservative politician	John Taylor, Baron Taylor of Holbeach	10 December 2014	Government Chief Whip in the Lords and Captain of the Gentlemen-at-Arms (2014–2019)
HM judiciary	Kathryn Thirlwall	12 April 2017; 3 May 2017	Lady Justice of Appeal (2017–present); Senior Presiding Judge for England and Wales (2020–2021)
Commonwealth judiciary	Ted Thomas	19 November 1996	Justice of the Court of Appeal of New Zealand (1995–2001)
HM judiciary	John Thomas, Baron Thomas of Cwmgiedd	8 October 2003; 11 February 2004	Lord Justice of Appeal (2003–2011); Senior Presiding Judge for England and Wales (2003–2006); President of the Queen's Bench Division (2011–2013); Lord Chief Justice of England and Wales (2013–2017)
Labour politician	Nick Thomas-Symonds	10 March 2021; 10 November 2021	Shadow Home Secretary (2020–2021); Shadow Secretary of State for International Trade (2021–2023); Shadow Minister without Portfolio in the Cabinet Office (2023–2024); Paymaster General (2024–2026); Minister for the Constitution and European Union Relations (2024–2026)
Other politician	Owen Thompson	10 April 2024	Member of the Intelligence and Security Committee of Parliament (2023–2024)
Labour politician	Emily Thornberry	15 February 2017	Shadow Foreign Secretary (2016–2020); Shadow First Secretary of State (2017–2020); Shadow Secretary of State for International Trade (2020–2021); Shadow Attorney General for England and Wales (2021–2024); Chair of the Foreign Affairs Select Committee (2024–present)
HM judiciary	Mathew Thorpe	23 November 1995	Lord Justice of Appeal (1995–2013)
Lib. Dem. politician	John Sinclair, 3rd Viscount Thurso	16 July 2014	Long-serving MP (2001–15); Chair of the Finance and Services Committee (2010–2015)
Labour politician	Stephen Timms	9 May 2006	Financial Secretary to the Treasury (1999–2001, 2004–2005 and 2008–2010); Chief Secretary to the Treasury (2006–2007); Minister of State for Competitiveness (2007–2010); Shadow Minister for Employment (2010–2015); Shadow Secretary of State for Work and Pensions (2015); Minister of State for Social Security and Disability (2024–present)
Commonwealth judiciary	Andrew Tipping	21 May 1998; 22 May 2002	Justice of the Court of Appeal of New Zealand (1997–2004); Justice of the Supreme Court of New Zealand (2004–2012)
Conservative politician	Kelly Tolhurst	8 March 2023	MP for Rochester and Strood (2015–2024); Government Deputy Chief Whip and Treasurer of the Household (2022); Minister of State for Schools and Childhood (2022)
Conservative politician	Michael Tomlinson	21 February 2024	Minister of State for Countering Illegal Migration (2023–2024)
HM judiciary	Stephen Tomlinson	16 March 2011; 10 May 2011	Lord Justice of Appeal (2010–2017)
Labour politician	Don Touhig, Baron Touhig	19 July 2006	Parliamentary Under-Secretary of State at the Ministry of Defence (2005–2006)
HM judiciary	Colman Treacy	7 November 2012; 12 February 2013	Lord Justice of Appeal (2012–2018)
Conservative politician	David Trefgarne, 2nd Baron Trefgarne	1989	Minister for Trade and Industry (1989–1990); Longest-serving member in the House of Lords (2021–present)
Conservative politician	Anne-Marie Trevelyan	19 February 2020	Secretary of State for International Development (2020); Minister of State for Business, Energy and Clean Growth (2021); Secretary of State for International Trade and President of the Board of Trade (2021–2022); Secretary of State for Transport (2022); Minister of State for Indo-Pacific (2022–2024)
Conservative politician	Laura Trott	13 December 2023	Chief Secretary to the Treasury (2023–2024); Shadow Chief Secretary to the Treasury (2024); Shadow Secretary of State for Education (2024–present)
Conservative politician	Nicholas True, Baron True	13 September 2022	Leader of the House of Lords and Lord Privy Seal (2022–2024); Shadow Leader of the House of Lords (2024–present)
Conservative politician	Liz Truss	16 July 2014	Secretary of State for Environment, Food and Rural Affairs (2014–2016); Lord Chancellor and Secretary of State for Justice (2016–2017); Chief Secretary to the Treasury (2017–2019); Secretary of State for International Trade and President of the Board of Trade (2019–2021); Secretary of State for Foreign, Commonwealth and Development Affairs (2021–2022); Prime Minister of the United Kingdom (2022)
HM judiciary	Simon Tuckey	21 October 1998; 17 November 1998	Lord Justice of Appeal (1998–2008)
Conservative politician	Tom Tugendhat	13 September 2022; 12 October 2022	Minister of State for Security (2022–2024); Shadow Minister for Security (2024); Shadow Foreign Secretary (2026–present)
Labour politician	Anna Turley	10 September 2025	Chair of the Labour Party and Minister without Portfolio (2025–2026); Minister of State at the Home Office (2026–present)
HM judiciary	Alan Turnbull, Lord Turnbull	12 October 2016; 16 November 2016	Senator of the College of Justice (2006–present)
Lib. Dem. politician	Paul Tyler, Baron Tyler	5 March 2014	Long-serving MP (1974 and 1992–2005) and member of the House of Lords (2005–2021)
HM judiciary	Colin Tyre, Lord Tyre	13 April 2022; 11 May 2022	Senator of the College of Justice, Inner House (2021–present)
Conservative politician	Andrew Tyrie, Baron Tyrie	16 July 2014	Chair of the Treasury Select Committee (2010–2017)
Conservative politician	Edward Lister, Baron Udny-Lister	10 March 2021; 21 July 2021	Prime Minister's Chief Strategic Advisor (2019–2020)
Conservative politician	Nicholas Lowther, 2nd Viscount Ullswater	1994	Minister for the Department of the Environment
HM judiciary	Nicholas Underhill	15 May 2013; 13 June 2013	Lord Justice of Appeal (2013–present)
Commonwealth politician	Simon Upton	14 December 1999; 14 November 2001	New Zealand Minister of Health (1990–1993); Minister for the Environment (1990–1999); Minister of Research, Science and Technology (1990–1996); Parliamentary Commissioner for the Environment (2017–present)
Labour politician	Shriti Vadera, Baroness Vadera	8 July 2009; 15 October 2009	Parliamentary Under-Secretary in the Department for International Development (2007–2008); Parliamentary Under-Secretary in the Department for Business, Enterprise and Regulatory Reform (2007–2009); Parliamentary Under-Secretary in the Cabinet Office (2008–2009)
Conservative politician	Ed Vaizey, Baron Vaizey of Didcot	15 July 2016; 12 October 2016	Minister of State for Culture, Communications and Creative Industries (2010–2016)
Conservative politician	Shailesh Vara	8 July 2022	Secretary of State for Northern Ireland (2022)
Other politician	Keith Vaz	19 July 2006; 10 October 2006	Minister for Europe (1999–2001)
Labour politician	Valerie Vaz	8 October 2019; 12 February 2020	Shadow Leader of the House of Commons (2016–2021)
Conservative politician	Theresa Villiers	9 June 2010; 21 July 2010	Minister of State for Transport (2010–2012); Secretary of State for Northern Ireland (2012–2016); Secretary of State for Environment, Food and Rural Affairs (2019–2020)
HM judiciary	Geoffrey Vos	6 November 2013; 11 February 2014	Lord Justice of Appeal (2013–2016); Chancellor of the High Court (2016–2021); Master of the Rolls (2021–present)
HM judiciary	John Waite	1993	Lord Justice of Appeal (1993–1997)
Conservative politician	John Wakeham, Baron Wakeham	1983	Government Chief Whip in the Commons and Parliamentary Secretary to the Treasury (1983–1987); Leader of the House of Commons (1987–1989); Lord Privy Seal (1987–1988); Lord President of the Council (1988–1989); Secretary of State for Energy (1989–1992); Leader of the House of Lords and Lord Privy Seal (1992–1994)
Conservative politician	William Waldegrave, Baron Waldegrave of North Hill	1990	Secretary of State for Health (1990–1992); Chancellor of the Duchy of Lancaster (1992–1994); Minister of Agriculture, Fisheries and Food (1994–1995); Chief Secretary to the Treasury (1995–1997)
Royal Family/ Household	William, Prince of Wales	9 June 2016	Second in line to the throne (1982–2022); Heir apparent to the throne (2022–present)
Conservative politician	Ben Wallace	12 April 2017; 3 May 2017	Minister of State for Security and Economic Crime (2016–2019); Secretary of State for Defence (2019–2023)
Lib. Dem. politician	William Wallace, Baron Wallace of Saltaire	10 September 2012; 7 November 2012	Lord-in-waiting (2010–2015)
HM judiciary	Mark Waller	15 October 1996; 19 November 1996	Lord Justice of Appeal (1996–2010); Intelligence Services Commissioner (2011–2016)
HM judiciary	Mark Warby	10 March 2021; 29 September 2021	Lord Justice of Appeal (2021–present)
HM judiciary	Alan Ward	15 March 1995	Lord Justice of Appeal (1995–2013)
Other politician	Norman Warner, Baron Warner	19 July 2006	Minister of State for National Health Services Delivery (2005–2007)
Conservative politician	Sayeeda Warsi, Baroness Warsi	13 May 2010	Minister without Portfolio and Chair of the Conservative Party (2010–2012); Senior Minister of State for Foreign and Commonwealth Affairs (2012–2014)
HM judiciary	Ronald Weatherup	10 February 2016	Lord Justice of Appeal, Northern Ireland (2015–2017)
Lib. Dem. politician	Steve Webb	16 July 2014	Minister of State for Pensions (2010–2015)
HM judiciary	Reginald Weir	10 February 2016	Lord Justice of Appeal, Northern Ireland (2015–2017)
Clergy	Justin Welby	12 February 2013; 13 March 2013	Archbishop of Canterbury (2013–2025)
Labour politician	Alan West, Baron West of Spithead	9 June 2010; 13 October 2010	Parliamentary Under-Secretary of State for Security and Counter-Terrorism (2007–2010)
HM judiciary	John Wheatley, Lord Wheatley	6 March 2007; 2 May 2007	Senator of the College of Justice, Inner House (2007–2011)
Conservative politician	John Wheeler	1993	Minister for Security, Northern Ireland Office (1993–1997)
HM judiciary	Philippa Whipple	15 December 2021; 16 February 2022	Lady Justice of Appeal (2021–present)
Conservative politician	Craig Whittaker	8 March 2023	Government Deputy Chief Whip and Treasurer of the Household (2022)
Conservative politician	John Whittingdale	14 May 2015	Secretary of State for Culture, Media and Sport (2015–2016); Minister of State for Media and Data (2020–2021); Acting Minister of State for Media, Tourism and Creative Industries (2023); Acting Minister of State for Data and Digital Infrastructure (2023)
Labour politician	Larry Whitty, Baron Whitty	12 October 2005	General Secretary of the Labour Party (1985–1994); Lord-in-waiting (1997–1998); Parliamentary Under-Secretary of State for Roads (1998–2001); Parliamentary Under-Secretary of State for Farming, Food and Sustainable Energy (2001–2005)
Other politician	Dafydd Wigley, Baron Wigley	30 October 1997	Long-serving MP (1974–2001); Welsh Assembly Member (1999–2003); Leader of Plaid Cymru (1981–1984 and 1991–2000)
Conservative politician	David Willetts, Baron Willetts	9 June 2010	Minister of State for Universities and Science (2010–2014)
Clergy	Rowan Williams, Baron Williams of Oystermouth	20 November 2002; 17 December 2002	Archbishop of Canterbury (2002–2012)
Conservative politician	Susan Williams, Baroness Williams of Trafford	16 March 2022	Minister of State for Home Affairs (2016–2022); Government Chief Whip in the Lords and Captain of the Gentlemen-at-Arms (2022–2024); Opposition Chief Whip in the Lords (2024–present); Deputy Speaker of the House of Lords (2024–present)
Conservative politician	Gavin Williamson	14 May 2015	Parliamentary Private Secretary to the Prime Minister (2013–2016); Government Chief Whip in the Commons and Parliamentary Secretary to the Treasury (2016–2017); Secretary of State for Defence (2017–2019); Secretary of State for Education (2019–2021); Minister of State without Portfolio (2022)
Lib. Dem. politician	Jenny Willott	10 December 2014	Parliamentary Under-Secretary of State for Employment Relations, Consumer and Postal Affairs (2013–2014)
Labour politician	Michael Wills, Baron Wills	5 November 2008	Minister of State for Justice (2007–2010)
Labour politician	Brian Wilson	17 July 2003	Special Representative on Overseas Trade (2003–2005)
HM judiciary	Nicholas Wilson, Lord Wilson of Culworth	15 November 2005	Lord Justice of Appeal (2005–2011); Justice of the Supreme Court of the United Kingdom (2011–2020)
Other politician	Sammy Wilson	13 December 2017; 8 February 2018	MP (2005–present); Democratic Unionist Party Chief Whip in the House of Commons (2019–2024 and 2024–present)
Commonwealth politician	Paias Wingti	1987	Prime Minister of Papua New Guinea (1985–1988 and 1992–1994)
Labour politician	Rosie Winterton, Baroness Winterton of Doncaster	19 July 2006	Minister of State for Health Services (2003–2007); Minister of State for Transport (2007–2008); Minister of State for Pensions (2008–2009); Minister for Yorkshire and the Humber (2008–2010); Minister for Regional Economic Development and Co-ordination (2009–2010); Shadow Leader of the House of Commons (2010); Opposition Chief Whip in the Commons (2010–2016); Deputy Speaker of the House of Commons (2017–2019); First Deputy Chairman of Ways and Means (2020–2024); Parliamentary Under-Secretary of State for Indo-Pacific (2026–present)
HM judiciary	Morag Wise, Lady Wise	13 April 2022	Senator of the College of Justice, Inner House (2022–present)
HM judiciary	James Wolffe	12 October 2016; 16 November 2016	Lord Advocate (2016–2021)
Labour politician	Shaun Woodward	28 June 2007	Secretary of State for Northern Ireland (2007–2010); Shadow Secretary of State for Northern Ireland (2010–2011)
HM judiciary	Harry Woolf, Baron Woolf	1986	Lord Justice of Appeal (1986–1992); Lord of Appeal in Ordinary (1992–1996); Master of the Rolls (1996–2000); Lord Chief Justice of England and Wales (2000–2005)
HM judiciary	Stephen Woolman, Lord Woolman	2 September 2020; 28 April 2021	Senator of the College of Justice, Inner House (2020–2023)
Conservative politician	Jeremy Wright	16 July 2014	Attorney General for England and Wales (2014–2018); Secretary of State for Digital, Culture, Media and Sport (2018–2019); Shadow Attorney General (2024)
HM judiciary	Amanda Yip	10 March 2026	Lord Justice of Appeal (2025–present)
Conservative politician	George Young, Baron Young of Cookham	1993	Financial Secretary to the Treasury (1994–1995); Secretary of State for Transport (1995–1997); Shadow Leader of the House of Commons (2009–2010); Leader of the House of Commons and Lord Privy Seal (2010–2012); Parliamentary Secretary to the Treasury and Government Chief Whip (2012–2014); Lord-in-waiting (2016–2019)
Royal Family/ Household	Edward Young, Baron Young of Old Windsor	11 October 2017	Private Secretary to the Sovereign (2017–2023)
Other politician	Humza Yousaf	17 May 2023	First Minister of Scotland (2023–2024)
HM judiciary	Antony Zacaroli	6 November 2024; 18 December 2024	Lord Justice of Appeal (2024–present)
Other politician	Nadhim Zahawi	20 September 2021	Secretary of State for Education (2021–2022); Chancellor of the Exchequer (2022); Chancellor of the Duchy of Lancaster and Minister for Intergovernmental Relations (2022); Minister for Equalities (2022); Chair of the Conservative Party and Minister without Portfolio (2022–2023)

== See also ==
- List of Royal members of the Privy Council
- Privy Council (United Kingdom)
- List of Commonwealth heads of government
