= List of current members of the Privy Council =

List of current members of the Privy Council may refer to:

- List of current members of the British Privy Council
- List of current members of the King's Privy Council for Canada
