= Alastair Cameron, Lord Abernethy =

Scottish lawyer

The Right Honourable Lord Abernethy PC

Senator of the College of Justice
- In office 1992–2007
- Nominated by: John Major; As Prime Minister
- Appointed by: Elizabeth II
- Succeeded by: Lord Malcolm

Personal details
- Born: John Alastair Cameron; 1 February 1938 (age 88)
- Spouse: Elspeth Miller
- Education: Pembroke College, Oxford
- Profession: Advocate

John Alastair Cameron, Lord Abernethy, PC (born 1 February 1938) is a Scottish lawyer, and a former Senator of the College of Justice, a judge of the country's Supreme Courts, serving from 1992 to 2007, when he retired. He was a member of the English Bar before moving to the Scottish Faculty of Advocates, where he served as vice-dean from 1983 to 1992.

== Early life ==
Cameron was educated at the Clergy School, Khartoum, St. Mary's School, Melrose, and Trinity College, Glenalmond. He undertook National Service as a Second Lieutenant with the Royal Army Service Corps from 1956 to 1958, and then studied at Pembroke College, Oxford.

== Legal career ==
Cameron was called to the Bar at the Inner Temple in 1963, but moved to the Faculty of Advocates in 1966. He served as an Advocate Depute from 1972 to 1975, Standing Junior Counsel to the Department of Energy from 1976 to 1979 and Standing Junior Counsel to the Scottish Development Department from 1978 to 1979. He was appointed Queen's Counsel in 1979, and the same year became Director of Faculty Services Limited, the services branch of the Faculty of Advocates, and was its chairman from 1983 to 1989. He was Legal Chairman of the Pensions Appeal Tribunals from 1979 to 1992, serving in addition as President of the Tribunal from 1985. He was elected Vice-Dean of the Faculty of Advocates in 1983, serving until his appointment to the Bench.

In 1992, he was appointed a Senator of the College of Justice, a judge of the Court of Session and High Court of Justiciary, Scotland's Supreme Courts, with the judicial title, Lord Abernethy, and promoted to the Inner House of the Court of Session in 2005, being appointed to the Privy Council. He was one of the four judges in the original Pan Am Flight 103 bombing trial.

He was vice-chairman of the Judges' Forum of the International Bar Association from 1993 to 1994, and chairman from 1994 to 1998. He then became a member of the Council of the IBA's Section on Legal Practice from 1998 to 2002, and of the Council of its Human Rights Institute from 1998 to 2000 and 2002 to 2005. He was the first President of the Scottish Medico-Legal Society, serving from 1996 to 2000. He is also the author of Medical Negligence: An Introduction (ISBN 978-0902023116).

Lord Abernethy resigned as a judge in 2007, being succeeded in the Inner House by Lord Wheatley, whose seat in the Outer House was filled by the appointment of Colin Campbell, Lord Malcolm, former Dean of the Faculty of Advocates.

== Personal life ==
Cameron married Elspeth Miller in 1968. They have three sons. His interests include travel, sport, nature conservation and Africana. He is an Honorary Fellow of Pembroke College, Oxford.

== See also ==
- List of Senators of the College of Justice
