= Colin Campbell, Lord Malcolm =

Scottish lawyer and judge

The Right Honourable Lord Malcolm

Senator of the College of Justice
- Incumbent
- Assumed office 2007
- Nominated by: Jack McConnell; As First Minister
- Appointed by: Elizabeth II

Personal details
- Born: Colin Malcolm Campbell; 1 October 1953 (age 72)
- Education: University of Dundee
- Profession: Advocate

Colin Malcolm Campbell, Lord Malcolm PC (born 1953) is a Scottish lawyer, and a Senator of the College of Justice, a judge of the country's Supreme Courts.

== Early life ==
Campbell was educated at Grove Academy, a state school in Broughty Ferry, Dundee, and at the School of Law of the University of Dundee (LL.B. Hons.). He was admitted to the Faculty of Advocates in 1977, and was a lecturer in the School of Law of the University of Edinburgh from 1977 to 1979.

== Legal career ==
Campbell was appointed Standing Junior Counsel to the Scottish Development Department in 1984, serving there until 1990, in which year he was appointed Queen's Counsel. He was elected Vice-Dean of the Faculty of Advocates in 1997 and Dean of Faculty in 2001 until 2004. He was a part-time member of the Mental Welfare Commission for Scotland from 1997 to 2001, and was one of the first members of the Judicial Appointments Board for Scotland on its establishment in 2002, serving until 2005.

Campbell was appointed to the Bench of the Supreme Courts of Scotland in 2007, succeeding Lord Wheatley in the Outer House of the Court of Session upon the latter's promotion to the Inner House in succession to Lord Abernethy, who retired. He took the judicial title, Lord Malcolm.

Lord Malcolm has served as a judge of the Commercial Court of the Court of Session. On 1 July 2014, he was appointed to the Second Division of the Inner House. On 20 January 2015, he was appointed a member of the Privy Council of the United Kingdom, and was sworn a member of the council on 19 March 2015.

== Personal life ==
In 1977, Campbell married Fiona Anderson. They live in Edinburgh.

== See also ==
- List of Senators of the College of Justice
