= First-tier Tribunal =

First-instance general tribunal in the United Kingdom

First-Tier Tribunal
- Royal coat of arms of the United Kingdom as used in England and Wales
- Established: 2007
- Jurisdiction: United Kingdom
- Location: Multiple
- Authorised by: Tribunals, Courts and Enforcement Act 2007
- Appeals to: Upper Tribunal
- Website: www.judiciary.uk

The First-tier Tribunal is a first-instance general tribunal in the United Kingdom.

It was created in 2008 as part of a programme, enacted in the Tribunals, Courts and Enforcement Act 2007, to rationalise the tribunal system, and has since taken on the functions of 20 previously existing tribunals. It is administered by His Majesty's Courts and Tribunals Service.

Appeals from it lie to the Upper Tribunal, the second part of the 'two-tier system'.

== Chambers and jurisdiction ==
The tribunal currently consists of seven chambers, structured around subject areas (although the General Regulatory Chamber has a very broad remit). The chambers may be divided into sections, mirroring the jurisdictions inherited from the tribunals which have been merged into the First-tier Tribunal. Different jurisdictions have been transferred into the tribunal in a programme which began in 2008 and is continuing.

Chamber/Section	Jurisdiction	Date Established/Transferred
General Regulatory Chamber		1 September 2009
Alternative Business Structures	Hears appeals against decisions made by the Council for Licensed Conveyancers	12 September 2011
Charity	Hears appeals against the decisions of the Charity Commission, applications for review of decisions of the Commission and considers references from the Attorney General or the Charity Commission on points of law.	1 September 2009
Claims Management Services	Hears appeals from businesses providing services such as personal injury or criminal injuries compensation claims management against refusal of authorisation or imposition of sanctions by the Claims Management Regulator.	18 January 2010
Consumer Credit	Hears appeals against decisions of the Office of Fair Trading relating to consumer credit licences, including the imposition of requirements or a civil penalties on licensees and the refusal to register, cancellation of registration, or imposition of a penalty under the Money Laundering Regulations 2007.	1 September 2009
Environment	Hears appeals against environment civil sanctions issued by the Environment Agency and Natural England.	6 April 2010
Estate Agents	Hears appeals against decisions made by the Office of Fair Trading prohibiting a person from acting as an estate agent or issuing a warning to an estate agent.	1 September 2009
Examination Boards	Hears appeals by examination boards against fines imposed by the Office of Qualifications and Examinations Regulation or the Welsh Government	1 May 2012
Gambling Appeals	Hears appeals against the decisions of the Gambling Commission regarding operating licences for companies, as well as personal functional and personal management licences to people in key management positions.	18 January 2010
Immigration Services	Hears appeals against decisions made by the Office of the Immigration Services Commissioner and considers disciplinary charges brought against immigration advisors by the Commissioner.	18 January 2010
Information Rights	Hears appeals from notices issued by the Information Commissioner regarding breaches of the law on Freedom of Information, Data Protection, and the Privacy and Electronic Communications Regulations 2003.	18 January 2010
Local Government Standards	Hears references and appeals about the conduct of members of English local authorities, and appeals against the decisions of local standards committees.	18 January 2010
Transport	Hears appeals against decisions of the Registrar of Approved Driving Instructors and against decisions of Transport for London regarding London bus service permits, and resolves disputes between postal service providers and carriers.	1 September 2009
Social Entitlement Chamber		3 November 2008
Asylum Support	Hears appeals from decisions made by the UK Border Agency to refuse or terminate support for asylum seekers, such as the provision of accommodation and cash for essential needs.	3 November 2008
Social Security and Child Support	Deals with disputes about Universal Credit, Income Support, Jobseeker's Allowance, Incapacity Benefit, Employment and Support Allowance, Disability Living Allowance, Attendance Allowance, Child Support, Tax Credits, the State Pension, statutory sick pay and maternity pay, Compensation Recovery Scheme/ Road Traffic (NHS) charges, Vaccine Damage Compensation and decisions on Housing Benefit and Council Tax Benefit.	3 November 2008
Criminal Injuries Compensation	Hears appeals against decisions of the Criminal Injuries Compensation Authority regarding financial compensation for victims of violent crime.	3 November 2008
Health, Education and Social Care Chamber		3 November 2008
Care Standards	Hears appeals against decisions of the Secretary of State to restrict or bar an individual from working with children or vulnerable adults and decisions to cancel, vary or refuse registration of certain health, childcare and social care provision.	3 November 2008
Mental Health	Hears applications and references for people detained under the Mental Health Act 1983 as amended by the Mental Health Act 2007, and directs the discharge of patients where the statutory criteria for discharge is satisfied. In practice still often referred to as a Mental Health Tribunal.	3 November 2008
Special Educational Needs & Disability	Hears appeals against decisions made by Local Education Authorities in England about the education of children with special educational needs.	3 November 2008
Primary Health Lists	Hears appeals/applications resulting from decisions made by primary care trusts as part of the local management of lists of General Practitioners, Dentists, Optometrists and some Pharmacists who are able to provide NHS services.	18 January 2010
Tax Chamber		1 April 2009
Tax	Hears appeals against decisions relating to tax made by HM Revenue and Customs (and by the Serious Organised Crime Agency when general revenue functions have vested in SOCA under Part 6 Proceeds of Crime Act 2002 where income or gains are suspected to have arisen as a result of criminal conduct).	1 April 2009
MPs' Expenses	Hears appeals against decisions of the Compliance Officer for the Independent Parliamentary Standards Authority relating to claims for expenses by Members of Parliament.	27 July 2010 which brought into force section 6A and Schedule 4 of the Parliamentary Standards Act 2009 as inserted by the Constitutional Reform and Governance Act 2010, section 31.
War Pensions and Armed Forces Compensation Chamber	Hears appeals from former members of the Armed Forces who have had their claims for a War Pension rejected by the Secretary of State for Defence.	3 November 2008
Immigration and Asylum Chamber	Hears appeals against decisions made by the Home Secretary in immigration, asylum and nationality matters, namely refusal of a protection claim, refusal of a human rights claim or revocation of protection status. The tribunal also hears appeals against refusal of leave under the EU settlement scheme and appeals against revocation of British Citizenship (unless there are national security implications which are heard by SIAC)	15 February 2010
Property Chamber	Hears appeals regarding Land Registration and Agricultural Land & Drainage, and exercises (in England only) the jurisdiction over various disputes between landlords and tenants which was formerly the responsibility of the Leasehold Valuation Tribunal.	1 July 2013

== Judiciary ==
The judiciary of the First-tier Tribunal comprises tribunal judges and other members. Legally qualified members of the former tribunals became Tribunal Judges of the First-tier Tribunal when their jurisdiction was transferred, whilst the lay members (often with expertise in the subject matter of the former tribunal) became other members. New judges and members are appointed by the Judicial Appointments Commission.

In addition, the following may also sit as Judges of the First-tier Tribunal:

- Judges of the Upper Tribunal
- Court of Appeal judges
- Court of Session judges
- High Court judges
- Circuit judges and sheriffs
- District judges and district judges (magistrates' courts)

The First-tier Tribunal is presided over by the Senior President of Tribunals, since 19 September 2020 Sir Keith Lindblom. Each chamber of the First-tier Tribunal is headed by a chamber president, and within each chamber each section or jurisdiction is headed by a principal judge.

In most cases, decisions are made by a judge and two other members, although this can vary between chambers and sections, and also depending on the case concerned.

Judges may be permanent office holders, known as salaried judges, or part time, known as fee paid judges.

== Appeal ==
In most cases, appeals against decisions of the First-tier Tribunal can be made to the Upper Tribunal, but only with the permission of the First-tier Tribunal or the Upper Tribunal. Before deciding whether to grant permission to Appeal to the Upper Tribunal, the First Tier Tribunal must consider whether to subject its own decision to 'Reconsideration'. In the case of Criminal Injuries Compensation and Asylum Support cases, there is technically no right of appeal, but a decision may be reviewed by way of an application to the Upper Tribunal for judicial review of the First-tier Tribunal's decision.
