= Keith Lindblom =

The Right Honourable Sir Keith Lindblom
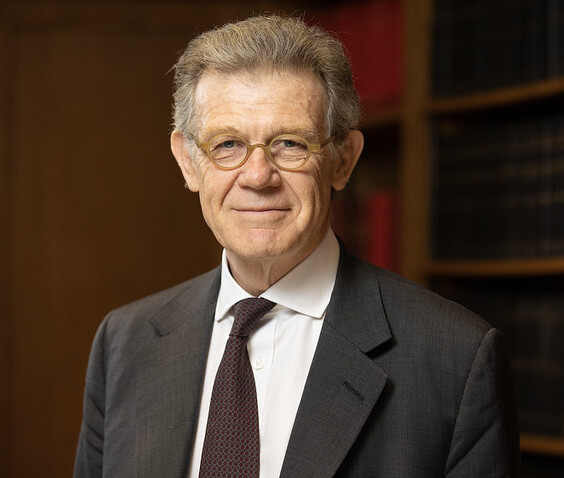
- Lindblom in 2024

Senior President of Tribunals
- In office 19 September 2020 – 1 August 2025
- Monarchs: Elizabeth II; Charles III
- Preceded by: Sir Ernest Ryder
- Succeeded by: James Dingemans

Lord Justice of Appeal
- In office 2 November 2015 – 18 September 2020
- Monarchs: Elizabeth II; Charles III
- Preceded by: Lord Justice Aikens

High Court Judge Queen's Bench Division
- In office 2010–2015

Personal details
- Born: 20 September 1956 (age 70)
- Education: St John's College, Oxford

Sir Keith John Lindblom, PC (born 20 September 1956), styled The Rt Hon Sir Keith Lindblom, is a King's Counsel and former Lord Justice of Appeal in the Court of Appeal.

== Career ==
He was educated at Whitgift School and St John's College, Oxford. He was subsequently called to the Bar in 1980 and touched cloth in 1996 to become a Queen's Counsel. He was appointed as a Recorder in 2001 and a deputy High Court Judge in 2009.

He was approved as a Justice of the High Court in 2010 and assigned to the Queen's Bench Division, being awarded the customary knighthood. He heard the first instance proceedings concerning legality of the Occupy London movement outside St. Paul's Cathedral.

Lindblom was appointed as President of the Upper Tribunal Lands Chamber on 1 January 2013. He was appointed as a Lord Justice of Appeal on 2 November 2015. He was appointed to the Privy Council of the United Kingdom in 2016.

Lord Justice Lindblom was appointed as Senior President of Tribunals effective from 19 September 2020 following the retirement of Sir Ernest Ryder.

== See also ==
- List of High Court judges of England and Wales
