= Yeginsu =

Yeginsu is a surname. Notable people with the surname include:

- Can Yeğinsu (born 1980), Turkish-British barrister and international attorney
- Ceylan Yeğinsu (born 1986), Turkish-British journalist, sister of Can
