= Uddin v The Secretary of State for the Home Department =

2020 British legal case

- Court: Court of Appeal
- Full case name: Asfar Uddin (Appellant) v The Secretary of State for the Home Department (Respondent)
- Decided: 12 March 2020
- Citation: [2020] EWCA Civ 338

Court membership
- Judges sitting: The Senior President of Tribunals (Sir Ernest Ryder); Lord Justice Bean; Lady Justice King

Keywords
- Immigration; right to family life

Uddin v The Secretary of State for the Home Department [2020] EWCA 338 is a Court of Appeal case about immigration and the right to a family life.

== Facts ==
Asfar Uddin was a Bangladeshi boy who came to the UK as a child. He was abandoned in London on 20 February 2013 when he was 13 years old. The Local Authority treated him as a trafficked child and placed him with foster carers. He applied for asylum on 27 February 2013. Asylum was refused, but Uddin was granted leave to remain as an unaccompanied asylum-seeking child until June 2017. In May 2017, he applied for asylum again. This was refused in both the First Tier Tribunal and the Upper Tier Tribunal, and permission to appeal was initially refused.

On 7 June 2019 Asplin LJ granted leave to appeal under Article 8 of the European Convention on Human Rights. By this time Uddin had bonded into his foster family. Uddin's foster mother treated him very much as she treated her natural children; her natural children treated Uddin as a sibling; and the local authority assessed Uddin as having a close attachment to her. He had no contact with any family in Bangladesh.

== Courts below ==
The tribunals found that Uddin would not be at risk of serious harm if returned to Bangladesh. They found that he had lived there for thirteen years, he could understand and make himself understood in Bengali, and he would be able to reintegrate into the society there.

The tribunals found Uddin's evidence about his life in Bangladesh unreliable, and saw some of his claims about that time as unlikely. They also found that his relationship with his foster family did not amount to a family life, and that because the foster family were paid maintenance by the Local Authority, Uddin's relationship with them was a fundamentally commercial one.

== Law ==
The case turned on whether the foster family relationship amounted to a family life for the purposes of Article 8 of the European Convention on Human Rights. The Secretary of State's case was that foster care is a special case where the appelant should have to prove that a family life exists.

== Judgment ==
The Court of Appeal unanimously disagreed with the Secretary of State and allowed the appeal. The case was referred back to a different constitution of the First Tier Tribunal to be re-decided.

== Significance ==
The right to a family life is about the substance of the family relationship, not its form. A foster family that provides real, committed, or effective support is a family in law.

Whether a real family life exists is fact-sensitive. Any application that relies on Article 8 needs to show that a family life exists, and there is no presumption either way.
