= Via XX Settembre =

Via XX Settembre may refer to:

== Streets and boulevards in Italy ==
- Via XX Settembre (Bergamo)
- Via XX Settembre (Cagliari)
- Via XX Settembre (Conegliano)
- Via XX Settembre (Ferrara)
- Via XX Settembre (Florence)
- Via XX Settembre (Genoa)
- Via XX Settembre (L'Aquila)
- Via XX Settembre (Lodi)
- Via XX Settembre (Milan)
- Via XX Settembre (Monza)
- Via XX Settembre (Rome)
- Via XX Settembre (Turin)

== Other ==
- Via XX Settembre, by metonymy, can refer to the Ministry of Economy and Finance of Italy
- Via XX Settembre (novel), a 2013 novel by Simonetta Agnello Hornby
