= Nicholas Lavender =

British judge

The Honourable Mr Justice Lavender KC
- Royal coat of arms of the United Kingdom

High Court Judge King's Bench Division
- Incumbent
- Assumed office 3 October 2016
- Monarchs: Elizabeth II; Charles III

Personal details
- Born: Nicholas Lavender; 7 August 1964 (age 62) Barnsley, Yorkshire, England
- Spouse: HHJ Anuja Dhir KC
- Children: 2 sons, 1 daughter
- Education: Corpus Christi College, Cambridge
- Awards: Knight Bachelor

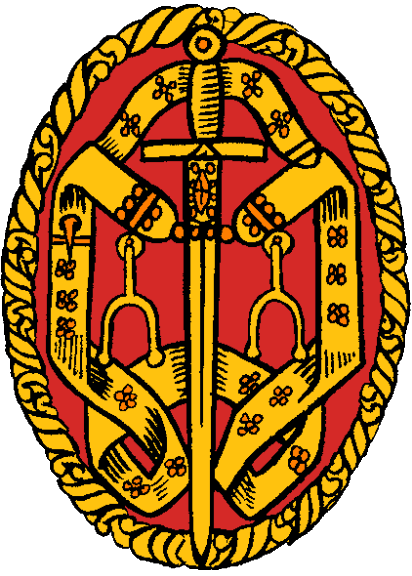
Insignia of a Knight Bachelor

Sir Nicholas Lavender, styled The Honourable Mr Justice Lavender (born 7 August 1964), is a Justice of the High Court of England and Wales.

== Education ==
Born at Barnsley in Yorkshire, Lavender was educated at Queen Elizabeth Grammar School, Wakefield, before going up to read Law at Corpus Christi College, Cambridge, graduating in 1987 as BA (proceeding MA). He then pursued further studies in jurisprudence at Oriel College, Oxford, taking a BCL.

== Career ==
Lavender was called to the Bar at the Inner Temple in 1986 and practised as a barrister in commercial law from Serle Court Chambers, taking silk in 2008. He served as a Recorder 2010–16, Deputy High Court Judge 2013–16, then Chairman of the Bar Council 2014–15.

Appointed a High Court Judge and assigned to the Queen's (now King's) Bench Division on 3 October 2016, Lavender was appointed a Knight Bachelor. He was Presiding Judge for the North Eastern Circuit 2019–2022.

On 3 October 2025, Sir Lavender was appointed President of the Immigration and Asylum Chamber in the Upper Tribunal.

== Family ==
In 2002, he married HHJ Anuja Dhir KC (Circuit Judge and Judicial Commissioner), by whom he has two sons and one daughter.

== See also ==
- List of High Court Judges of England and Wales
