= Daniel Wilsher =

Daniel Wilsher has been Professor in Law at The City Law School in London since 2014. In 2006 he was appointed a part-time Immigration Judge in the First Tier Immigration and Asylum Chamber, a position which he has held for the ensuing decade and a half.

He studied law and economics at King's College, Cambridge for his first degree and subsequently trained as a solicitor.

His doctorate was awarded to him in 2009 by the Centre for Migration Law at Radboud University in Nijmegen in 2009.
