= Upper Tribunal =

Superior general tribunal in the United Kingdom

- Royal coat of arms of the United Kingdom as used in England and Wales
- Established: 3 November 2008; 17 years ago
- Jurisdiction: United Kingdom
- Authorised by: Tribunals, Courts and Enforcement Act 2007
- Appeals to: Court of Appeal (England and Wales); Court of Session (Scotland); Court of Appeal (Northern Ireland)
- Appeals from: First-tier Tribunal
- Website: www.judiciary.uk

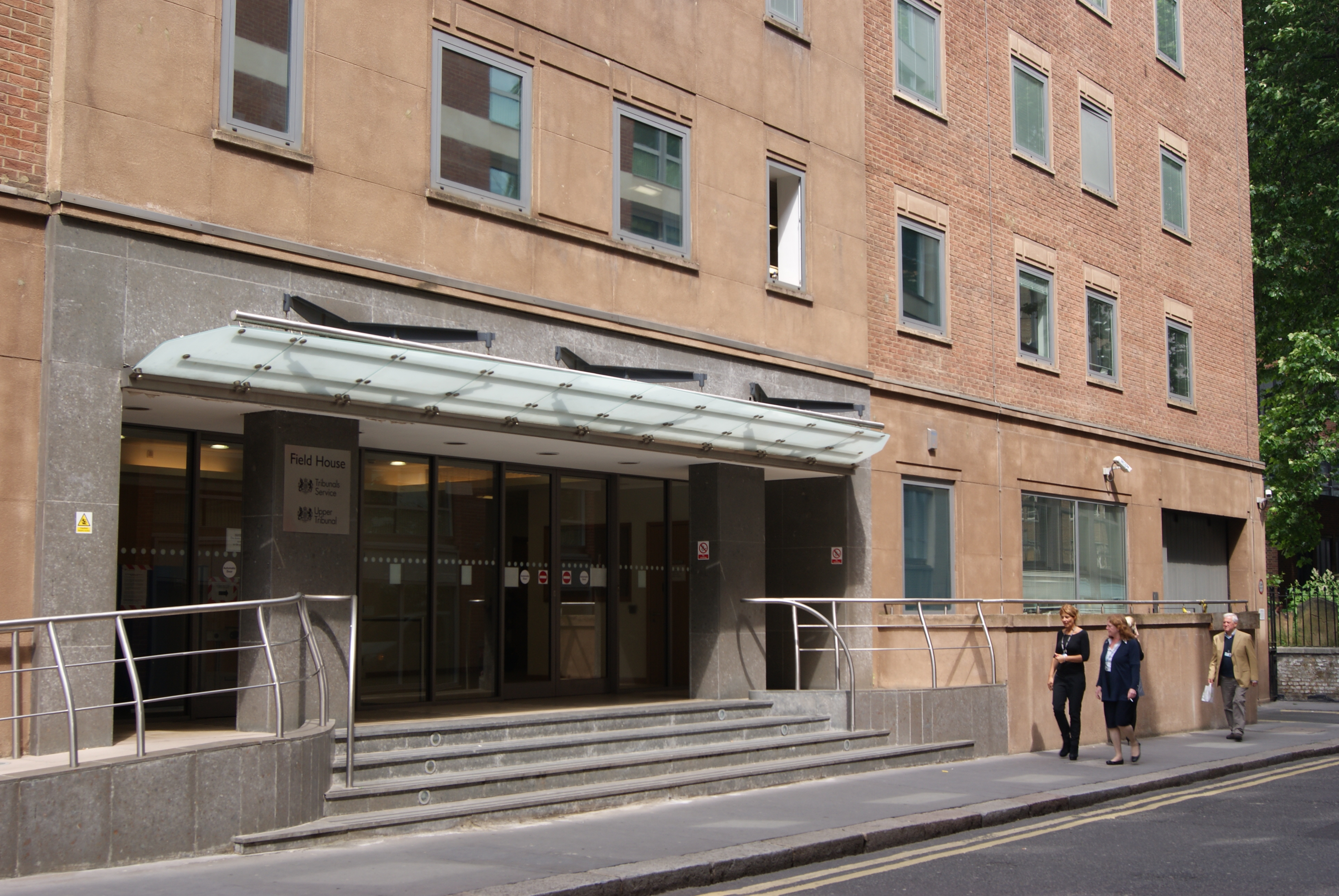
Field House at 15 Bream's Buildings, London, where the Upper Tribunal is based

The Upper Tribunal is a superior court of record and general tribunal in the United Kingdom.

It was created in 2008 as part of a programme, set out in the Tribunals, Courts and Enforcement Act 2007, to rationalise the tribunal system, and to provide a common means of handling appeals against the decisions of lower tribunals. It is administered by His Majesty's Courts and Tribunals Service.

The Upper Tribunal is a superior court of record, giving it equivalent status to the High Court and meaning that it can both set precedents and can enforce its decisions (and those of the First-tier Tribunal) without the need to ask the High Court or the Court of Session to intervene. It is also the first (and only) tribunal to have the power of judicial review.

== Chambers and jurisdiction ==
The tribunal currently consists of four chambers, structured around subject areas (although the Administrative Appeals Chamber has a broad remit). Different jurisdictions have been transferred into the tribunal in a programme which began in 2008 and is continuing.

=== Administrative Appeals Chamber ===
The Administrative Appeals Chamber hears appeals against decisions of the General Regulatory Chamber (except in Charity cases), the Health, Education and Social Care Chamber, the Social Entitlement Chamber, and the War Pensions and Armed Forces Compensation Chamber of the First-tier Tribunal, and applications for judicial review of First-tier Tribunal decisions in Criminal Injuries Compensation cases. The chamber may also deal with judicial review cases transferred to the Upper Tribunal from the High Court.

The chamber also hears appeals about decisions of the Disclosure and Barring Service (DBS) to prevent someone from working with children or vulnerable adults, and decisions of the Traffic Commissioners concerning operators of heavy goods vehicles and public service vehicles, and premises used as operating centres.

=== Tax and Chancery Chamber ===
The Tax and Chancery Chamber hears appeals against decisions of the First-tier Tribunal in tax or charity cases, and appeals against decision notices issued by the Financial Conduct Authority (for example, regarding authorisation and permission, penalties for market abuse, or disciplinary matters) and the Pensions Regulator.

The chamber may also hear applications for judicial review of some decisions made by HM Revenue and Customs, the Pensions Regulator, the Charity Commission, the Financial Services Authority and the Bank of England, decisions relation to banking regulations and to the assessment of compensation or consideration under the Banking (Special Provisions) Act 2008, and certain cases relating to the proceeds of crime.

=== Lands Chamber ===
The Lands Chamber decides disputes concerning land, including the purchase of land blighted by the proposals of a public authority, compensation for land compulsorily purchased and or the value of which has been affected by public works (such noise from an airport), and compensation for coal mining subsidence, coast protection works, reservoirs, and land drainage works.

The chamber also hears appeals from decisions of HM Revenue and Customs in which the value of land is disputed, from valuation tribunals concerning the value of land for non-domestic rates purposes, from leasehold valuation tribunals and residential property tribunals.

Finally, the chamber also hears applications to discharge or modify restrictions on the use of land (restrictive covenants) and applications for notices relating to the right to light.

=== Immigration and Asylum Chamber ===
This chamber hears appeals against decisions made by the First-tier Tribunal in matters of immigration, asylum and nationality. It also hears judicial reviews relating to immigration decisions of the Home Secretary which do not carry a right of appeal.

== Judiciary ==
The judiciary of the Upper Tribunal comprises judges and other members. Senior legally qualified members of former tribunals (now abolished and transferred into the First-tier and Upper Tribunals) became judges of the Upper Tribunal when their jurisdiction was transferred, whilst some lay members (generally experts in the subject matter of the former tribunal) became other members. New judges and members are appointed by the Judicial Appointments Commission.

In addition, the following may also sit as judges of the Upper Tribunal:

- Chamber President or a Deputy Chamber President of the First-tier Tribunal
- Court of Appeal judges
- Court of Session judges
- High Court judges
- circuit judges and sheriffs
- district judges and district judges (magistrates' courts)

The Senior President of Tribunals is currently Lord Justice Dingemans, who is the fifth to hold this role.

Each chamber of the Upper Tribunal is headed by a chamber president.

In most cases, decisions are made by a judge (or in the case of the Lands Chamber, a member) sitting alone, although in cases involving complex issues of law or expertise, a larger bench consisting of more than one judge, or a judge and one or more members, may hear the case.

== Appeals ==
Appeals against decisions of the Upper Tribunal can be made to the Court of Appeal (in England and Wales), or the Court of Appeal (in Northern Ireland) or the Court of Session (in Scotland).
