= Jeremy Sullivan =

British judge (born 1945)

The Right Honourable Sir Jeremy Sullivan

Senior President of Tribunals
- In office 25 June 2012 – 17 September 2015
- Preceded by: Lord Carnwath of Notting Hill
- Succeeded by: Sir Ernest Ryder

Lord Justice of Appeal
- In office January 2009 – 17 September 2015

Justice of the High Court
- In office 1997–2009

Personal details
- Born: 17 September 1945 (age 81)
- Education: King's College London

Sir Jeremy Mirth Sullivan PC (born 17 September 1945) became a Lord Justice of Appeal in January 2009 and was appointed Senior President of Tribunals in 2012. He retired from both positions on 17 September 2015. On 25 October 2016 the Transport Secretary announced that Sullivan would oversee the consultation which will follow his announcement recommending a third runway at Heathrow.

== Biography ==
He was educated at Framlingham College and King's College London (LLB, LLM) and was called to the Bar at Inner Temple in 1968 where he became a bencher in 1993.

By 1976 Sullivan was Counsel for the Department of Environment's M25 motorway public inquiry Other clients he represented included the London Borough Councils of Hammersmith and Haringey as well as the Attorney General; while he has worked closely with Harry Woolf in matters of Planning Law. By 1979 his Court of Appeal work included advocating the legalizing of uncompleted development work.

Sullivan was made a QC in 1982, recorder from 1989 to 1997, deputy judge of the High Court from 1993 to 1997, and judge of the High Court of Justice (Queen's Bench Division) 1997–2009. Between 1994 and 1997 he served as attorney-general to the Prince of Wales.

As a judge, Sullivan presided over the 2006 Afghan hijackers case, ruling that it was unlawful under the 1971 Immigration Act to restrict the Highjackers' leave to remain in the United Kingdom, and ordered that they be granted "discretionary leave to remain", which entitled them to work in the United Kingdom.

His rulings include the February 2007 judgment that the government's 2006 Energy Review had been "misleading" and "unlawful" in its handling of the UK nuclear energy debate, and a 2008 decision in favour of the Government and rejecting a judicial review which sought to reduce night flights at Heathrow.
