= Simonetta Agnello Hornby =

Italian novelist and food writer

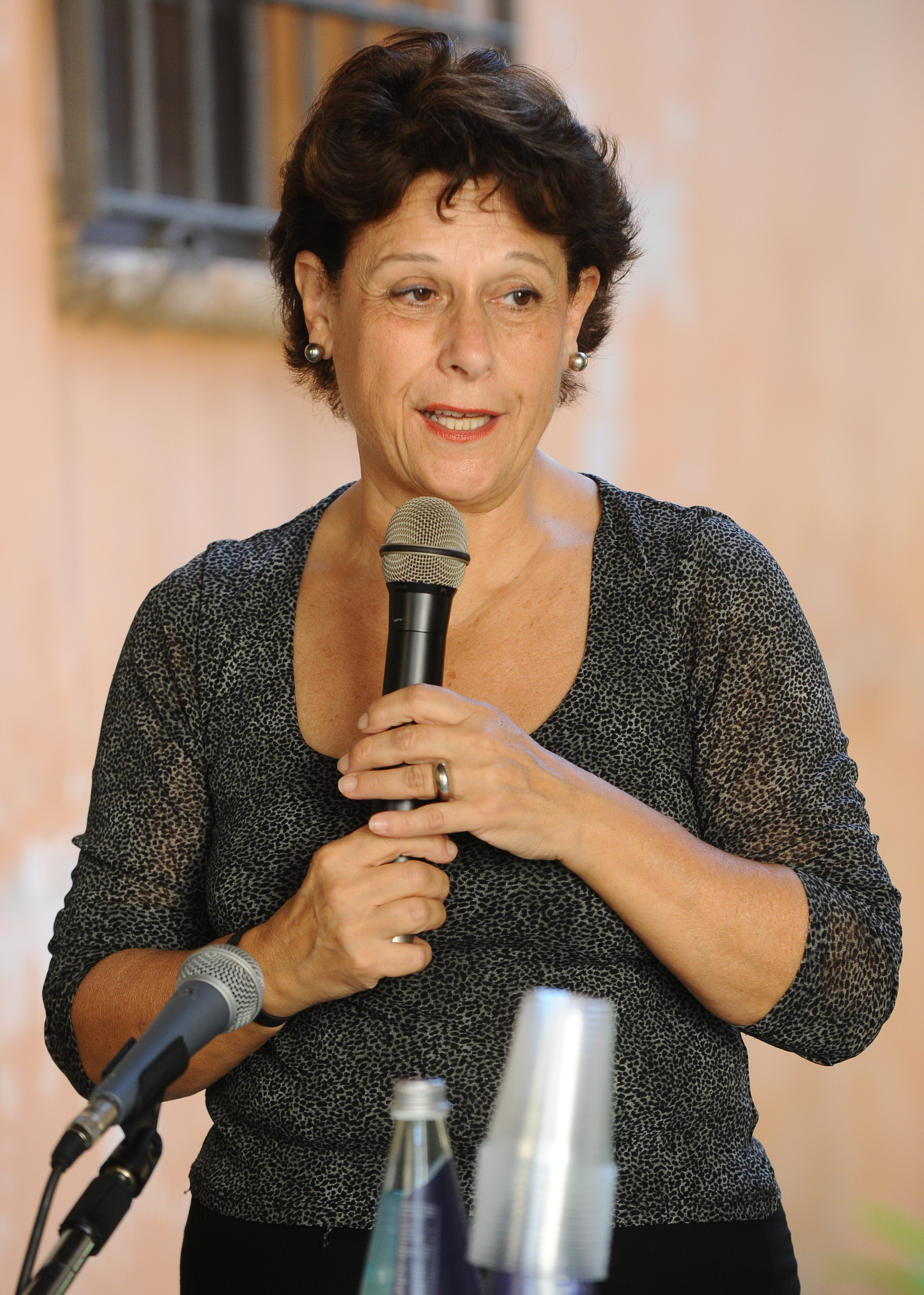
Simonetta Agnello Hornby (2012)

Simonetta Agnello Hornby is an Italian novelist and food writer. Her novels are international bestsellers, translated into more than twenty languages.

== Biography ==
Born in Palermo, Sicily, in 1945, Simonetta Agnello Hornby has spent most of her adult life in England where she worked as a solicitor for a community legal aid firm specialized in domestic violence that she co-founded in 1979. She has been lecturing for many years, and was a part-time judge at the Special Educational Needs and Disability Tribunal for eight years.

Her debut novel La Mennulara (The Almond Picker) was published in Italy in 2002 by Feltrinelli, and was awarded the Forte Village Literary Prize, The Stresa Prize for Fiction, and the "Alassio 100 Libri - An Author for Europe" Prize in 2003. Translated into more than ten languages, it became an international bestseller.

In the following decade, Hornby wrote six more novels: La zia Marchesa (The Marchesa), Boccamurata, Vento Scomposto, La Monaca (The Nun, winner of the Italian Pen Prize), and Il veleno dell'Oleandro. She has also published memoirs (Via XX settembre, La mia Londra), a collection of short stories (Il male che si deve raccontare), and books of recipes and etiquette Un filo d'olio, (La cucina del buon gusto). Her last book, Il pranzo di Mosè, was published in Italy in 2014. She lives in London.

She was awarded the Order of the Star of Italy in the rank of Grand Officer by the President of Italy on 2 June 2016.

She married Martin Hornby. They have two sons, George and Nicholas.

== Works ==
=== Translated into English ===
- The Almond Picker. Penguin Books Ltd. 2006. ISBN 9780141019093.
- The Marchesa. Penguin Books Ltd. 2007. ISBN 9780141023700.
- The Nun. Europa Editions UK. 2012. ISBN 9781609459109.

=== In Italian ===
- La Mennulara (The Almond Picker), Collana I Narratori, Milano, Feltrinelli, 2002, ISBN 88-07-01619-2; New extended edition, Collana I Narratori, Milano, Feltrinelli, 2019, ISBN 978-88-070-3302-5.
- La zia marchesa (The Marchesa), Collana I Narratori, Milano, Feltrinelli, 2004. ISBN 88-07-01659-1.
- Boccamurata, Collana I Narratori, Milano, Feltrinelli, 2007. ISBN 978-88-07-01712-4.
- Vento scomposto, Collana I Narratori, Milano, Feltrinelli, 2009. ISBN 978-88-07-01772-8.
- Camera oscura, Collana Art Stories, Milano, Skira, 2010. ISBN 978-88-572-0612-7.
- La monaca (The Nun), Collana I Narratori, Milano, Feltrinelli, 2010. ISBN 978-88-07-01823-7.
- Un filo d'olio, Collana La memoria, Palermo, Sellerio, 2011. ISBN 88-389-2549-6.
- La cucina del buon gusto, with Maria Rosario Lazzati, Collana Varia, Milano, Feltrinelli, 2012. ISBN 978-88-07-49120-7.
- La pecora di Pasqua, with Chiara Agnello, Bra, Slow Food, 2012. ISBN 978-88-8499-290-1.
- Il veleno dell'oleandro, Collana I Narratori, Milano, Feltrinelli, 2013. ISBN 978-88-07-01941-8.
- Il male che si deve raccontare per cancellare la violenza domestica, Simonetta Agnello Hornby e Marina Calloni, Milano, Feltrinelli, 2013. ISBN 978-88-07-49150-4.
- Via XX Settembre, Collana I Narratori, Milano, Feltrinelli, 2013. ISBN 978-88-07-03062-8.
- La mia Londra, Collana Scrittori, Firenze, Giunti, 2014. ISBN 978-88-09-78683-7.
- Il pranzo di Mosè, Collana Scrittori, Firenze, Giunti, 2014. ISBN 978-88-09-80254-4.
- Caffè amaro, Collana I Narratori, Milano, Feltrinelli, 2016. ISBN 978-88-07-03183-0.
- Nessuno può volare, Collana I Narratori, Milano, Feltrinelli, 2017. ISBN 978-88-07-03253-0.
- Rosie e gli scoiattoli di St. James, Simonetta Agnello Hornby e George Hornby, Illustrazioni di Mariolina Camilleri, Collana Biblioteca Junior, Firenze, Giunti, 2018, ISBN 978-88-098-6717-8.
- Marzo (multiple authors), Un anno in giallo, Palermo, Sellerio, 2017, ISBN 978-88-38-93712-5.
- La mennulara: Graphic novel, with Massimo Fenati, Milano, Feltrinelli, 2018, ISBN 978-88-07-55012-6.
- Siamo Palermo, with Mimmo Cuticchio, Collana Strade blu, Milano, Mondadori, 2019, ISBN 978-88-047-1325-8.
- Piano nobile, Collana I Narratori, Milano, Feltrinelli, 2020, ISBN 978-88-0703413-8
- Punto pieno, Collana I Narratori, Milano, Feltrinelli, 2021. ISBN 978-8807034626
- La cuntintizza, with Costanza Gravina, Mondadori, 2022. ISBN 9788804746607
- Era un bravo ragazzo, Collana Scrittori italiani e stranieri, Mondadori, 2023.
