= Anuja Dhir =

British circuit judge

Her Honour Judge Anuja Dhir KC
- Royal coat of arms of the United Kingdom

Circuit Judge
- Incumbent
- Assumed office 2012
- Monarchs: Elizabeth II; Charles III

Personal details
- Born: Anuja Ravindra Dhir; 19 January 1968 (age 58) Dundee, Scotland
- Spouse: Sir Nicholas Lavender KC (m. 2002; div. 2023)
- Children: 2 sons Daughter
- Parent: Prof. Ravindra Kumar Dhir OBE (father)
- Education: University of Dundee
- Occupation: Circuit Judge
- Profession: Lawyer

Styles of HHJ Anuja Dhir
- Reference style: Her Honour Judge
- Spoken style: Your Ladyship or My Lady
- Alternative style: Lady Lavender (courtesy title by marriage)

Anuja Ravindra Dhir,, KC (born 19 January 1968) is a British lawyer and circuit judge. She was the first non-white English judge to be appointed to sit full-time at the Old Bailey.

== Early life ==
Born in Dundee in 1968 of Indian heritage, Dhir was educated at Harris Academy before reading Law at Dundee University, graduating as LLB in 1988. A Gray's Inn Scholar, she was called to the Bar at Gray's Inn in 1989.

In 2018, Dhir received an honorary doctorate (Hon. LLD) from Dundee University.

== Career ==
Dhir practised as a barrister for 23 years, as counsel for both prosecution and defence for serious criminal cases as well as those involving national security and human rights.

Previously a member of various Bar Council Committees including the Equality Committee, the Professional Conduct Committee and Law Reform Committee, Dhir has been heavily involved in advocacy training in the UK and abroad: she was head of teacher training for Gray's Inn and has led training in India, Sri Lanka, Jamaica (death row cases), Bermuda, Bhutan, Malaysia, Singapore (for the AG), Zimbabwe and South Africa.

Elected a Bencher of Gray's Inn in 2009, she also took silk and was appointed Recorder, before promotion as a Circuit Judge in 2012. In February 2017, at the age of 49, Dhir became a Judge at the Old Bailey. Since 2015, she has been a tutor judge at the Judicial College. In November 2018 she made the headlines after sentencing an 18 year-old youth, who had threatened a motorist with a knife, already with a previous conviction for robbery with a knife, to a suspended sentence of imprisonment.

in 2018, Dhir was authorised to sit as a Judge in the Court of Appeal Criminal Division as well as being appointed to the Judicial Appointments Commission as a Judicial Commissioner.

A Governor of the Hackney City Academy School since 2016, she also serves as a Court Assistant of the Haberdashers' Company.

== Personal life ==
Married from 2002 to the Hon. Mr Justice Lavender KC, until 2023, she and Sir Nicholas have two sons and a daughter.
