= Special education in the United Kingdom =

Education of children with disabilities

Special education in the United Kingdom, as an aspect of education, is a devolved matter, with each of the countries of the United Kingdom having separate systems under separate governments. The UK Government is responsible for England, whilst the Scottish Government, the Welsh Government and the Northern Ireland Executive are responsible for Scotland, Wales and Northern Ireland, respectively.

Special education in Scotland is formally known as Additional Support Needs (ASN) or Additional Support for Learning (ASL) whereas in England it is usually referred to as 'Special educational needs' ('SEN'), or 'special educational needs and disabilities' ('SEND').

== Meaning ==
The meaning of SEN is set out in the Education Act 1996 and was amended in the Special Educational Needs and Disability Bill of 2001. Currently, a child or young person is considered to have SEN if they have a disability or learning difficulty that means they need special educational provision. Special educational provision means that the child needs support that would not generally be provided to a child of the same age in a mainstream school.

Some examples of SEN include:

- A condition which affects behaviour or social skills, such as ADHD or autism
- A condition that affects the ability to read and write, such as dyslexia or another specific learning difficulty
- A condition which affects the ability to learn, such as a learning disability
- A physical impairment, including a visual impairment, hearing impairment, a chronic health condition or poor mobility.

== Support available ==
There are numerous types of support available depending on the child or young person's disability. Some support offered includes:

- Following a different learning programme from the rest of the class
- Extra help from a teaching assistant or the class teacher
- Extra supervision in the classroom or at break time
- Working in a smaller group
- Support to communicate with other pupils
- Help with personal care (such as eating or using the toilet)
- Encouragement to complete tasks the pupil struggles with

=== Public examinations ===
Some support available for children with SEN include:

- Extra time to complete examinations
- Rest breaks
- Alternative formats for exam papers
- Use of a reader
- Use of a scribe
- Use of a live speaker for exams that include audio recordings
- Use of a prompter
- Use of a communication professional (a person who can translate questions into British Sign Language or International Sign Language)
- Use of a practical assistant
- Use of a word processor
- Completing examinations in a separate room or venue from other candidates at the school
- Exemption from certain parts of qualifications.

== SEN legal regulations ==
The SEN systems vary in each country of the United Kingdom.

=== England ===
The current regulations for SEN are set out in the Children and Families Act 2014. Different levels of support are given to children depending on how much support is required. Most children with SEN are given school-level support, known as SEN support. An Education, Health and Care Plan (EHCP) is given to children and young people who are considered to have complex needs. They can be used for children and young people aged 2–25. Children and young people with an EHCP are entitled to a personal budget. Every school must have a Special Educational Needs Co-Ordinator (SENCO), who is responsible for overseeing the support of pupils with SEN. Children with SEN in the UK can attend mainstream or special schools, but legally, local authorities are obliged to educate children in mainstream schools where possible. If a family feels that their child is not receiving sufficient support, they may take their local authority to the Special Educational Needs and Disability Tribunal to appeal any decisions the local authority has made on a child's support. Approximately one in five children receive support for special education needs.

==== Local offer ====
A Local Offer (or LO) is a statement detailing the pattern of support which a local authority expects to be available for children and young people with special educational needs (SEN) and/or disabilities within their area. It must include information about education, health and care provision. It should also tell families about training, employment and independent living options available for young people with special educational needs and/or disabilities. In accordance with the SEND Code of Practice, every local authority must publish a Local Offer. The Local Offer or LO should

- provide clear, comprehensive, accessible and up-to-date information about the available provision and how to access it,
- make provision more responsive to local needs and aspirations by directly involving disabled children and those with SEN and their parents, and disabled young people and those with SEN, and service providers in its development and review.

=== Scotland ===
In Scotland, the term additional support needs is used instead of SEN. As well as children with disabilities, this also encompasses children who may need support for reasons other than disability, such as children who are being bullied or who are in foster care. The Education (Additional Support for Learning) (Scotland) Act 2004 redefined the law relating to the provision of special education to children with additional needs by establishing a framework for the policies of inclusion and generally practicing the "presumption of mainstreaming" in education. Children with complex needs who require support from external organisations are given a co-ordinated support plan. Families who are not satisfied with the support given are entitled to take the education authority to the Additional Support Needs for Scotland Tribunal.

=== Northern Ireland ===
Regulations for SEN in Northern Ireland are currently governed by the Special Educational Needs and Disability Act (Northern Ireland) 2016. In Northern Ireland, there are five stages of SEN support. Stages 1 to 3 are known as school-based stages. Stage 1 is when concerns are first raised about a child having SEN, and support is given within the classroom, such as differentiated work or different teaching strategies. If the child's difficulties improve at this stage, the child is no longer classed as having SEN. However, if they do not improve, the child will be moved to stage 2. At stage 2, advice from the child's GP or the school doctor is sought and an education plan is drawn up by the SENCO, which describes the difficulties the child has and the support they need. If the child does not make good progress at stage 2, they move on to stage 3. At stage 3, external specialists, such as educational psychologists are involved in the child's support. If a child does not make progress while on stage 3, they are referred to stage 4. Stage 4 is also known as Statutory Assessment. Children who have very significant disabilities are referred straight to Statutory Assessment without having to go through the school-based stages. Stage 5 is when a SEN statement is issued. The SEN statement sets out the child's difficulties and the support they require, as well as which school the child should attend (this can be a mainstream or special school).

== History ==
Local authorities became responsible for the education of Deaf children and blind children in 1893. The education of children with disabilities became mandatory in the Education Act 1918. The prevailing attitude at the time was that disabled children should be sent to residential schools rather than attending mainstream schools. The Education Act 1944 created provision for children with disabilities to receive "special educational treatment" in special schools. Children were required to have a medical assessment to be eligible for this. Some children were classified as uneducable, and were not required to attend school. The 1970 Education (Handicapped Children) Act removed uneducable category, which allowed all disabled children to receive an education. SEN statements were introduced in 1978 and parents of children with disabilities were given the right to appeal decisions made by local authorities about decisions on their child's education The 1981 Education Act stated that children should be taught in mainstream schools whenever possible. The role of the Special Needs Coordinator emerged in 1982 to audit mainstream special provision, raise the expectations of fellow teachers and advocate for disabled people even during educational cutbacks. The 1993 Education Act made SENCOs mandatory for all schools and set out guidelines for identifying pupils with SEN and assessing their needs. The 2001 Special Educational Needs and Disability Act outlawed discrimination against disabled pupils in schools, colleges and other education settings. It also introduced the Special Educational Needs and Disability Tribunal.

Prior to the Children and Families Act 2014, there were three levels of support in England and Wales:

- school action- for pupils with relatively low-level needs who can be supported with additional support provided within school, such as the use of specialist teaching materials in lessons.
- school action plus- for pupils who need additional support from an external support service. For example, a speech and language therapist or an educational psychologist.
- SEN statement-for pupils with more complex needs.

In the English law case of Skipper v Calderdale Metropolitan Borough School (2006) EWCA Civ 238, the Court of Appeal allowed the appellant could claim against her former school for failing to diagnose and treat her dyslexia.

== Criticisms ==
=== Underfunding ===
Funding provision for pupils with Special Education Needs and Disabilities, (SEND) has been criticised as inadequate. Some councils claimed to be unable to carry out their statutory duties towards SEND children due to lack of funding from the central government. Educators also complained that they cannot educate SEND pupils as effectively as they would like due to lack of funding.

In 2019 the Education Select Committee of the House of Commons published a report stating reforms introduced in 2014 had been badly implemented damaging many SEND pupils. Children had to do without support they needed, which affected their mental health as well as their education, children experienced anxiety, depression and self-harm, and children as young as nine had attempted suicide. Children's families had to try and cope with a bureaucracy. The report also criticised a funding shortfall and called for greater accountability in the system. More rigorous inspection systems were called for together with clear consequences following failure. Parents and schools should be able to appeal directly to the DfE if Local Authorities did not meet their legal obligations. School inspections should focus more on SEND, social care ombudsmen and Local Authorities should have greater powers. Robert Halfon MP said, "The DfE cannot continue with a piecemeal and reactive approach to supporting children with Send. Rather than making do with sticking plasters, what is needed is a transformation, a more strategic oversight and fundamental change to ensure a generation of children is no longer let down." Kevin Courtney of the National Education Union said, "Schools and local authorities want to provide the best possible support for SEND pupils, but the tools needed are generally no longer available due to cuts to local services." The Local Government Association stated, "Councils support the reforms set out in the Children and Families Act in 2014, but we were clear at the time that the cost of implementing them had been underestimated by the government." In some cases parents withdrew their children from school resulting in action from authorities to force attendance. A group of parents mounted a legal challenge to this.

In 2024, the National Audit Office issued a reporting which found that the SEND system was "financially unsustainable" and "in urgent need of reform", noting that although funding had risen by 58% over the previous decade, families had lost confidence in the system.

By 2026, the financial pressure on the SEND system had become a focus of the proposed reform in England. The government proposed a new system in which more children would receive support through mainstream settings and individual support plans.

=== Exclusions and off-rolling ===
Children with SEN are much more likely to be formally excluded from school or off-rolled. Off-rolling is where a pupil is removed from a school's register, often shortly before GCSEs are due to be taken, which can cause the child's education to be discontinued. There have been claims that children with SEN who are unlikely to achieve the national target of five GCSEs at grades 4 to 9 are being excluded or off-rolled to raise a school's position in league tables. Anne Longfield, the children's commissioner, said "I have become more and more convinced that some schools are seeking to improve their overall exam results by removing vulnerable children from the school roll...sadly this can include children with Send, who have no option but to go into inappropriate alternative provision or home education."

=== Over-identification ===
There have been claims that affluent families will push for their child to be identified as having SEN so that the child can access additional support when the child may not genuinely have any disability. The number of children identified as having SEN has increased. Figures published in 2009 showed that 17.8% of pupils in English schools have SEN an increase from 14.9% in 2005, leading to claims that schools are labelling too many children as having SEN. Lorraine Petersen, the former chief executive of the National Association of Special Educational Needs, has said "they [parents] feel a label will give the child and perhaps the family additional support that they may not get without it; access to benefits, for instance, or support with exams or a place in a specialist setting." In other cases, schools have been accused of identifying non-disabled children as having SEN to hide poor teaching standards.

=== Under-identification ===
Conversely, some people argue that there is a problem with children with disabilities not being identified as needing additional support. This is said to be especially difficult for low-income families, who may not be able to afford private diagnostic assessments for conditions such as dyslexia. Bernadette John, the SEN director of The Good Schools Guide, says: "There's a good reason why middle-class parents are better able to get a special needs diagnosis for their child: cash. There is a dire shortage of educational psychologists in local authorities, and children can expect a wait of at least a year to see one for a diagnosis."

== See also ==
- Disability Discrimination Act 1995 (UK)
- Disabled Student's Allowance for university students with a disability
- Education (Additional Support for Learning) (Scotland) Act 2004
- Inclusion (disability rights)
- Learning disabilities in special education
- Learning theory (education)
- Qualified specialist dyslexia teachers
- Special education
- Teaching and Learning Research Programme
- Lamb Inquiry
