= Occupy London =

Social justice movement in London

- Part of the Occupy movement
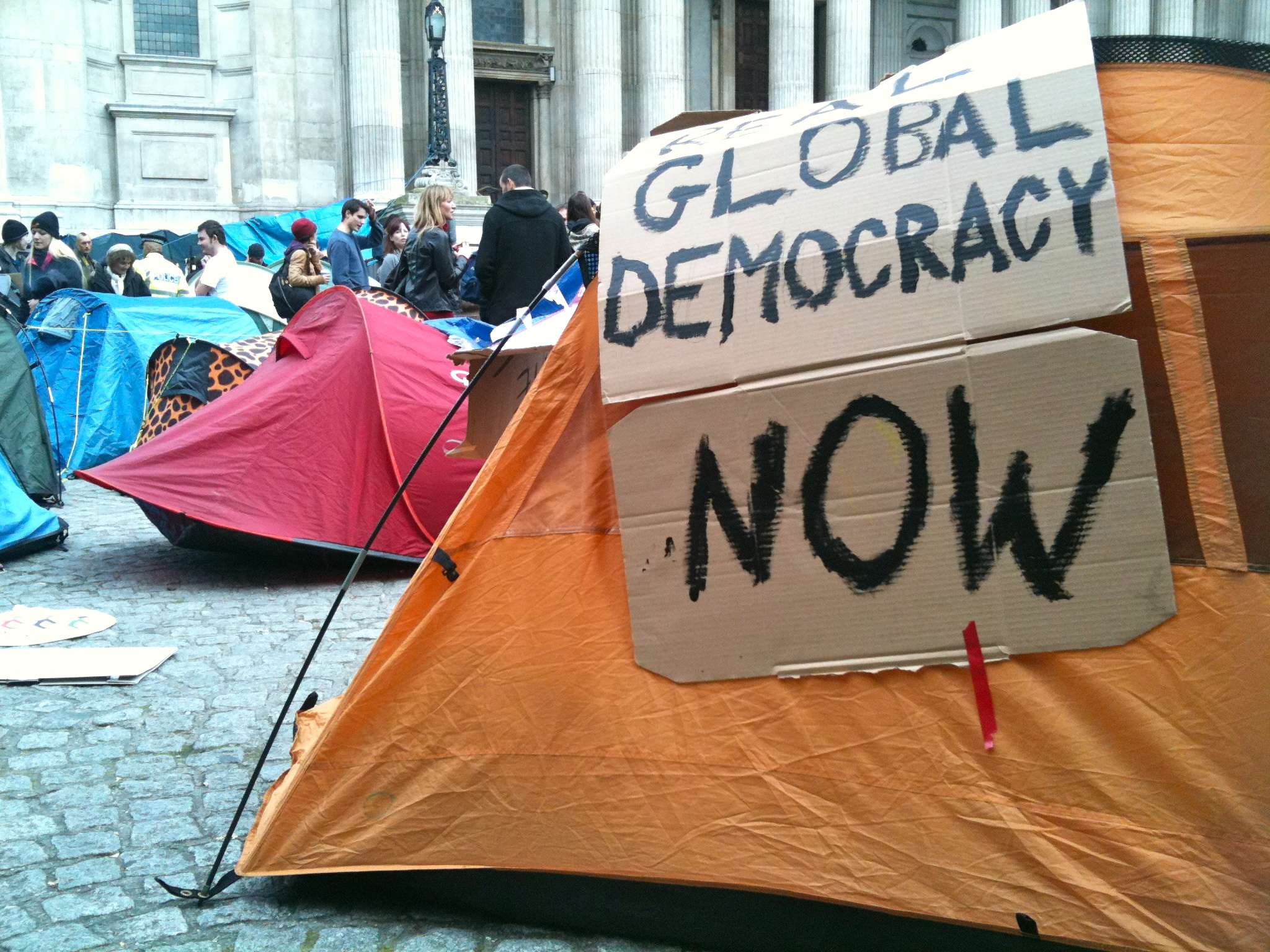
- Occupy London Tent
- Date: 15 October 2011 – 14 June 2012
- Location: London, England, United Kingdom
- Caused by: Economic inequality, corporate influence over government, inter alia.
- Methods: Demonstration, occupation, protest, street protesters
- Status: Ended

Number
- Thousands (at peak in Oct & Nov 2011)

Occupy London was a political movement in London, England, and part of the international Occupy movement. While some media described it as an "anti-capitalist" movement, in the statement written and endorsed by consensus by the Occupy assembly in the first two days of the occupation, occupiers defined themselves as a movement working to create alternatives to an "unjust and undemocratic" system. A second statement endorsed the following day called for "real global democracy". Due to a pre-emptive injunction, the protesters were prevented from their original aim to camp outside the London Stock Exchange. A camp was set up nearby next to St Paul's Cathedral. On 18 January 2012, Mr Justice Lindblom granted an injunction against continuation of the protest but the protesters remained in place pending an appeal. The appeal was refused on 22 February, and just past midnight on 28 February, bailiffs supported by City of London Police began to remove the tents.

The protests began in solidarity with the Occupy Wall Street protests in New York, United States, and with support from tax avoidance protest group UK Uncut and the London-based contingent of the Spanish 15M movement. In October protesters established a second encampments in Finsbury Square just to the north of the City of London. In November, a third site was opened in a disused office complex owned by UBS. Named by protesters as the Bank of Ideas, the site was located in Hackney and was evicted in late January 2012.

A fourth site was established in late December, at the disused premises of Old Street Magistrates Court in east London. The site's owners objected to its proposed long-term use by occupiers, and agreement was reached for the building to be vacated by the end of January 2012. In February 2012, occupiers were evicted from their main camp at St Paul's, and from the Bank of Ideas, leaving Finsbury Square as the last London site to remain occupied. The Finsbury Square camp was cleared by authorities in June 2012.

== Chronology ==
=== 2011 events ===
==== October ====
On 10 October 2011, a campaign was launched on Facebook for protests to take place at the London Stock Exchange on 15 October in solidarity with the Occupy Wall Street protests in New York and with multiple other protests planned worldwide for that day.

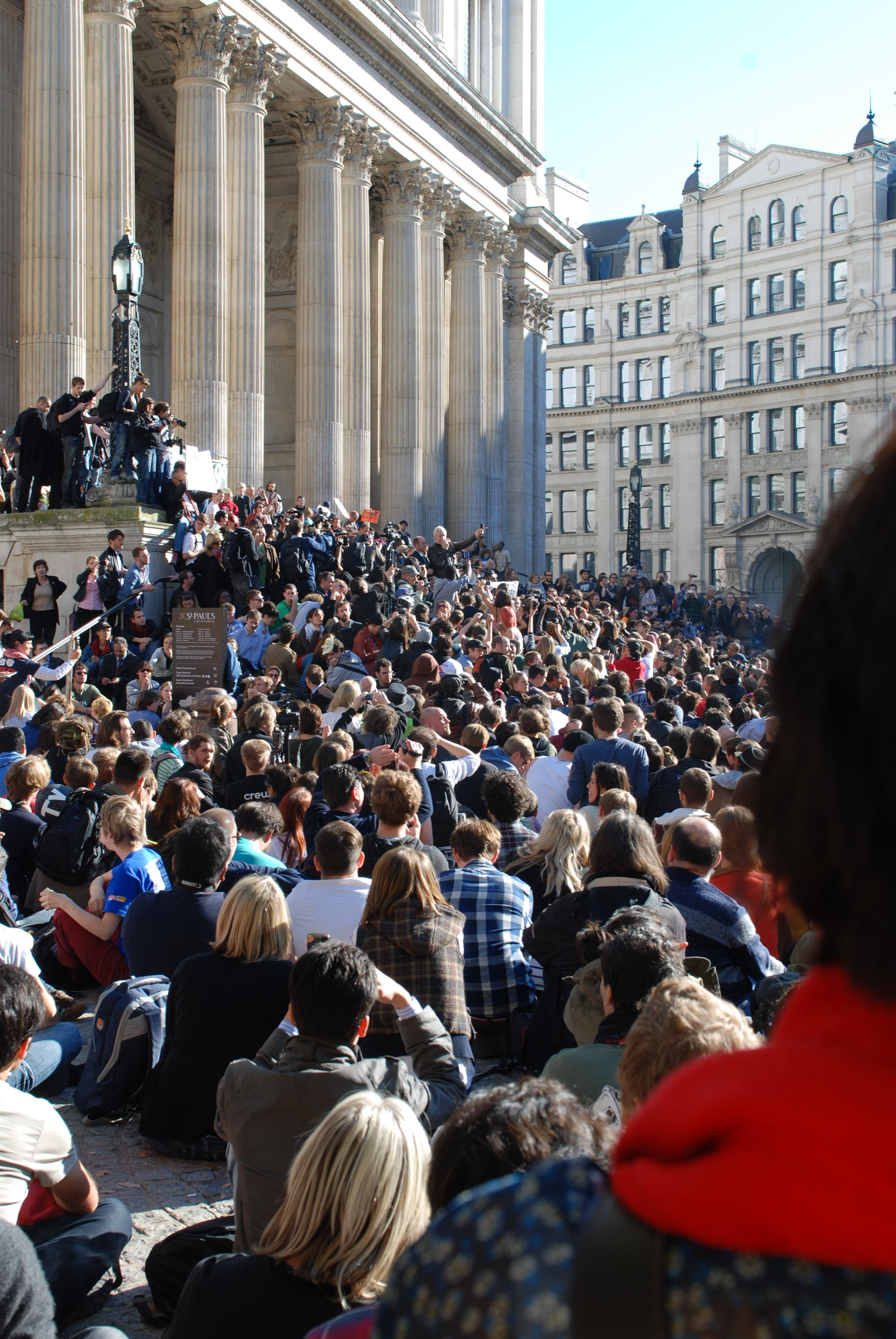
Assange speaks at the Occupy London outside the cathedral in the City of London.

The London Stock Exchange in Paternoster Square was the initial target for the protesters on 15 October. However, the police blocked access to the square, enforcing a High Court injunction against public access. 2,500–3,000 people gathered nearby outside St Paul's Cathedral, with around 250 camping overnight. During the afternoon of 15 October Julian Assange, the founder of WikiLeaks, gave an impromptu speech to the protesters on the topic of anonymity after he was challenged by police for wearing a mask as he walked to the protest. On the Sunday morning a canon of St. Paul's, Giles Fraser, asked the police to leave the cathedral steps, saying he was happy for people to "exercise their right to protest peacefully" outside the cathedral.

On 16 October, a gathering of over 500 Occupy London protesters collectively agreed upon and issued the following 'Initial Statement':

1. The current system is unsustainable. It is undemocratic and unjust. We need alternatives; this is where we work towards them.
2. We are of all ethnicities, backgrounds, genders, generations, sexualities, dis/abilities and faiths. We stand together with occupations all over the world.
3. We refuse to pay for the banks' crisis.
4. We do not accept the cuts as either necessary or inevitable. We demand an end to global tax injustice and our democracy representing corporations instead of the people.
5. We want regulators to be genuinely independent of the industries they regulate.
6. We support the strike on 30 November and the student action on 9 November, and actions to defend our health services, welfare, education and employment, and to stop wars and arms dealing.
7. We want structural change towards authentic global equality. The world's resources must go towards caring for people and the planet, not the military, corporate profits or the rich.
8. The present economic system pollutes land, sea and air, is causing massive loss of natural species and environments, and is accelerating humanity towards irreversible climate change. We call for a positive, sustainable economic system that benefits present and future generations.
9. We stand in solidarity with the global oppressed and we call for an end to the actions of our government and others in causing this oppression.

— occupylsx (Occupy London), Statement issued from the assembly on the steps of St Paul's Cathedral, reported in The Guardian and The Daily Telegraph

By 17 October, an encampment of around 150 tents together with makeshift tarpaulin shelters was clustered around the west side of St Paul's Cathedral.

On 21 October, the Dean of St Paul's announced that the cathedral would be closing until further notice as a result of the Occupy London camp pitched outside, and asked the protesters to leave the vicinity of the building "so that the cathedral can reopen as soon as possible". On the evening of the 21st it was reported that the protesters had decided that they would remain in their encampment outside the cathedral, and that they believed that they could not be lawfully removed from the site without a court order.

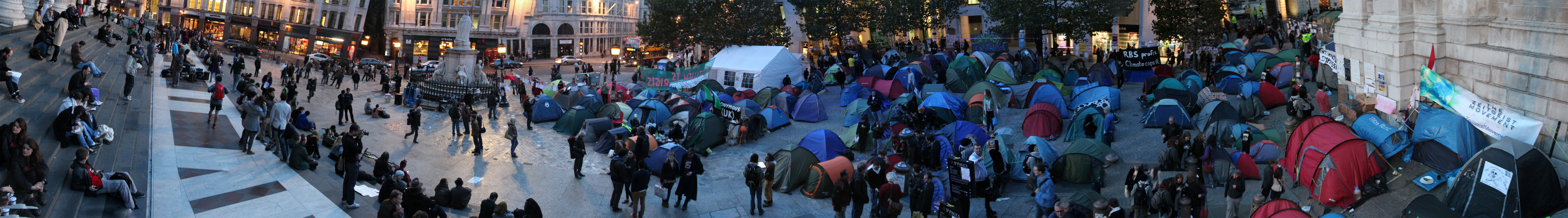
A panorama of the protest outside St Paul's Cathedral

On 22 October, the protesters established a second camp in Finsbury Square, just north of the City of London in the London Borough of Islington.

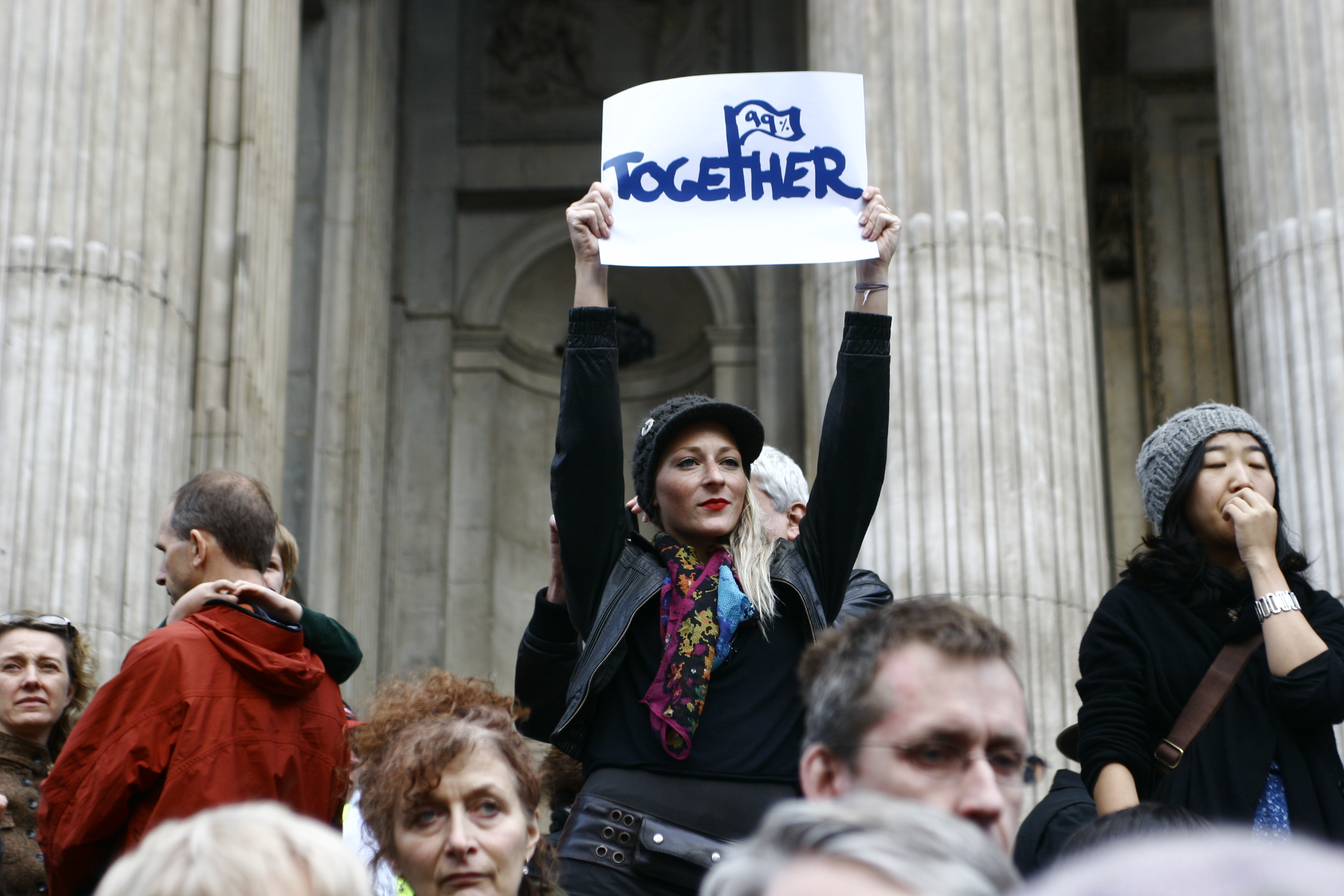
Solidarity poster referencing the We are the 99% slogan.

On 26 October it was reported that the Dean of St Paul's had decided that the cathedral would reopen on 28 October, following the resolution of all health and safety concerns. The move was described as an "embarrassing U-turn" by the British national newspaper The Daily Telegraph.

On 27 October, Giles Fraser resigned as Canon Chancellor of St Paul's over disagreements on the handling of the demonstrators, saying "I resigned because I believe that the chapter has set on a course of action that could mean there will be violence in the name of the church."

On 28 October, the movement's first set of demands, "Democratise The City of London Corporation", was published.

==== November ====
On 1 November Graeme Knowles, the dean of St Paul's, resigned following the backlash against his Chapter's resolution to forcibly evict the Occupy London protesters from outside the cathedral. The City of London Corporation proceeded to take legal action against the camp at St Pauls, without support from the cathedral. Canary Wharf Group took legal action on 3 November to prevent Occupy London protesters from setting up camp in London's Docklands.

On 18 November, protesters took over a disused office complex owned by the bank UBS, located in the London Borough of Hackney. The site was opened to the public the following day as the Bank of Ideas, and claimed to provide free services including a library, seminars and various discussion related events. On 28 November protesters at the Hackney site said they would contest attempts by lawyers to have them evicted.

==== December ====
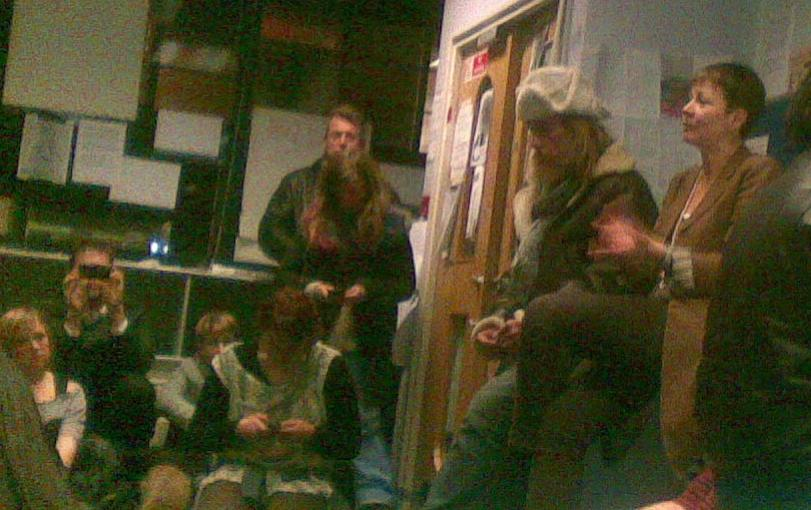
Caroline Lucas, at the time leader of the Green party, discussing green economics with occupiers at the Bank of Ideas on 6 December 2011.

In early December, the City of London Police made reference to Occupy London in a letter warning businesses about potential terrorist threats. It stated that: "It is likely that activists aspire to identify other locations to occupy, especially those they identify with capitalism. City of London Police has received a number of hostile reconnaissance reports concerning individuals who would fit the anti-capitalist profile. All are asked to be vigilant regarding suspected reconnaissance, particularly around empty buildings." By late December, consensus among occupiers at the main camp in St Paul's had seemed to coalesce round a view that is would be better to leave voluntarily as long as they can be allowed to keep a small presence, and negotiations were started to see if agreement could be reached with the cathedral. Also, in late December, a fourth site was established in east London at an unused court and police complex. Occupiers announced plans to use the new site to host a symbolic "trial of the 1%"

=== 2012 events ===
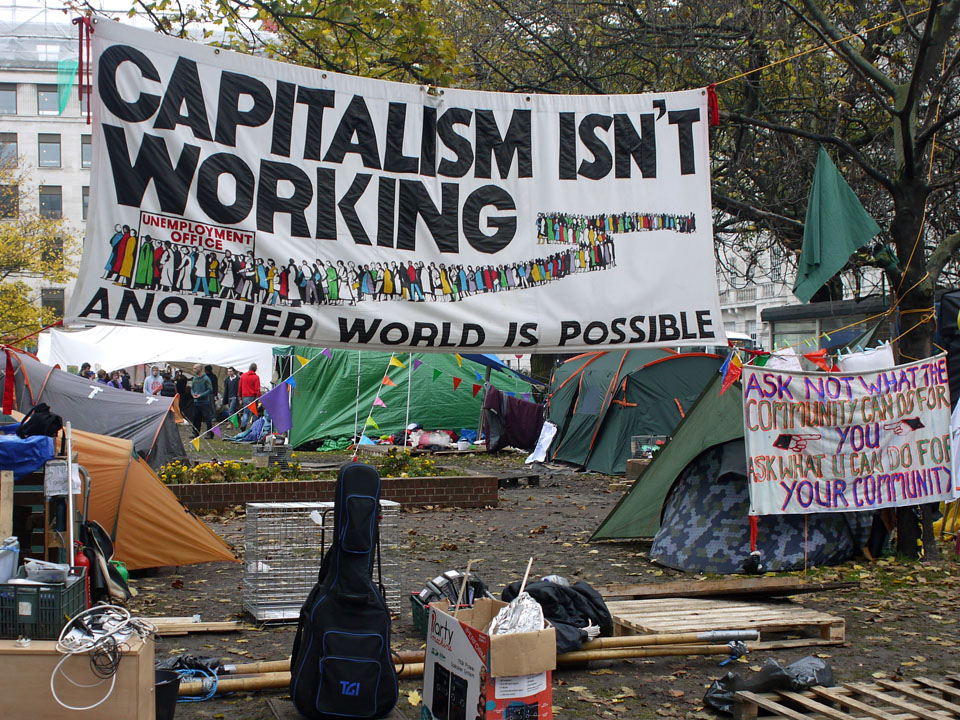
A view of the camp at Finsbury Square – by late February 2012 this was Occupy London's last remaining site, until it too was cleared in mid June.

On 18 January, the High Court ruled in favour of the City of London Corporation, giving them the power to order the eviction of occupiers from the St Paul's Camp. A spokesperson for the City said they would not further pursue eviction until 20 January, to give the occupiers a chance to appeal against the ruling. The appeal date was later set to 13 February 2012. Comparing the St Paul's camp as it was in January 2012 with its first few weeks, journalists such as Sid Ryan, Brendan O'Neill and Laurie Penny noted a change of character, with energy being diverted from political activism into caring for homeless and mentally ill people attracted by the companionship and shelter. Ryan has argued that despite caring for the homeless being a worthwhile cause, it may help the movement achieve change in the wider world if the camp is evicted.

On 30 January, occupiers were evicted from the site where they had set up their Bank of Ideas, by bailiffs acting on behalf of UBS, who owned the premises.

In mid February, Occupy London took over an abandoned school in Islington, which they called the School of Ideas. They were evicted two weeks later, with authorities arranging for the school to be bulldozed on 28 February. Also on 28 February, occupiers and their tents were removed from the area surrounding St. Paul's Cathedral, by a team of bailiffs supported by riot police. The St Paul's site had been the last surviving high-profile camp of the worldwide Occupy movement. At the time of its eviction it was also the largest one remaining. According to the Financial Times, Occupy activists insisted that their campaigning would continue, with some displaying banners announcing that the protests so far were "just the beginning."

In April, Bloomberg reported that the St Paul's camp cost London authorities just over a million pounds in monitoring and legal fees, while the Finsbury Square camp had so far cost about £10,000.

In December 2012, the Corporation of the City of London acquiesced to one of the Occupy London demands, releasing information about a previously secret bank account called City's Cash. This fund had existed for hundreds of years and proved to contain more than £1.319bn. With an income of £145m per annum, 29% of this comes from school fees, with a further eight per cent coming from rents and nine per cent coming from grants, reimbursements, and contributions. However, the largest source of revenue was 52 per cent from investments.

== See also ==
Occupy articles

- List of global Occupy movement protest locations
- "Occupy" protests
- Timeline of Occupy Wall Street
- We are the 99%

Other protests

- 15 October 2011 global protests
- 2011 United Kingdom anti-austerity protests
- 2010 UK student protests
- 2011 United States public employee protests
- 2011 Wisconsin protests

Related articles

- Arab Spring
- Corruption Perceptions Index
- Deterritorial Support Group
- Economic inequality
- Grassroots movement
- Plutocracy

Related portals:
