= 2006 Afghan hijackers case =

2000 aircraft hijacking

Ariana Afghan Airlines Flight 805
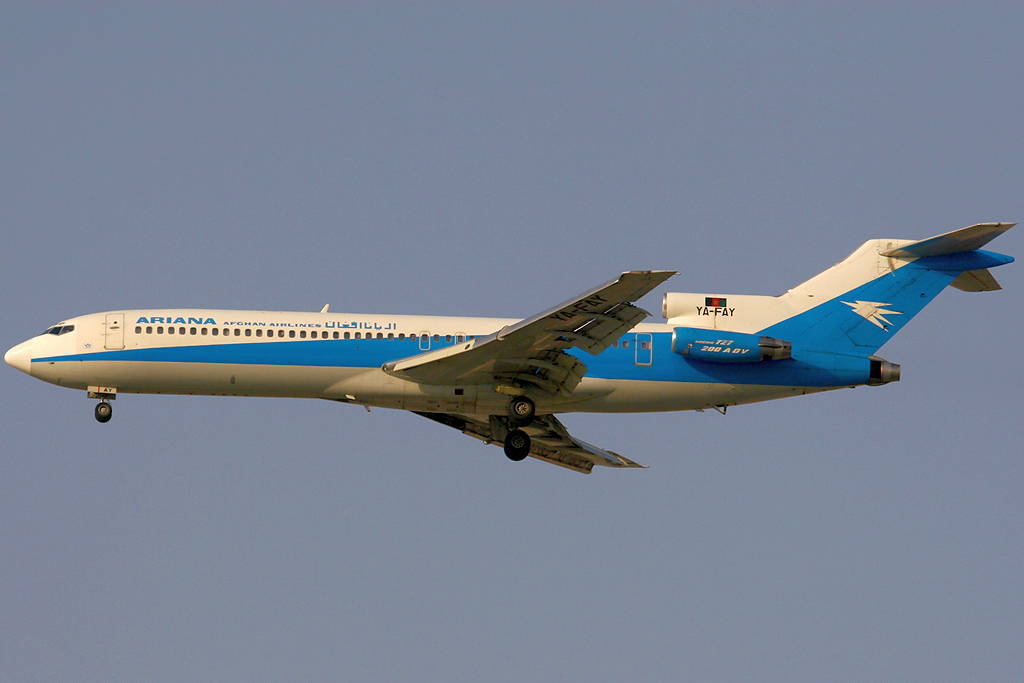
- YA-FAY, the aircraft involved, in 2007

Hijacking
- Date: 6 February 2000
- Summary: Hijacking
- Site: en route

Aircraft
- Aircraft type: Boeing 727-228
- Operator: Ariana Afghan Airlines
- IATA flight No.: FG805
- ICAO flight No.: AFG805
- Call sign: ARIANA 805
- Registration: YA-FAY
- Flight origin: Kabul International Airport, Kabul, Afghanistan
- Destination: Mawlana Jalaluddin Mohammad Balkhi International Airport, Mazar-i-Sharif, Afghanistan
- Occupants: 187
- Passengers: 180
- Crew: 7
- Fatalities: 0
- Injuries: 0
- Survivors: 187

The Afghan hijackers case was a series of United Kingdom judicial rulings in 2006 in which it was ruled a group of nine Afghan men, who had hijacked an aircraft to escape the Taliban, had the right to remain in the UK. The case provoked widespread political controversy and was questioned by large sections of the media, causing widespread condemnation by many newspapers (most notably The Sun), and the leaders of both the Labour Party and the Conservative Party. Prime Minister of the United Kingdom Tony Blair called the ruling "an abuse of common sense", while the Conservative Party leader David Cameron pledged to reform British human rights legislation to prevent a recurrence of such situations.

== Timeline of the case ==
On 6 February 2000, a group of nine Afghan men led by brothers Ali Safi and Mohammed Safi fleeing the Taliban regime hijacked Ariana Afghan Airlines flight 805 a Boeing 727 aircraft registration YA-FAY with 180 passengers and seven crew. Flight 805 was a domestic flight from Kabul to Mazar-i-Sharif Airport. The hijackers forced the crew to fly to Stansted Airport in Essex, England after stopovers in Tashkent, Aktobe and Moscow. The siege of the aircraft lasted until 10 February. They were convicted of hijacking and false imprisonment in 2001 and sentenced to five years imprisonment, but their convictions were quashed by the Court of Appeal in 2003, because the trial judge's summing up made an error in law which might have misdirected the jury. The judge had advised that the defence of duress was only applicable if the defendants were under an actual objective threat, whereas the Court of Appeal ruled that in law the perception of a threat can be enough for the defendants to present duress as a defence.

In 2004, a panel of adjudicators ruled that returning the men to Afghanistan would breach their human rights in accordance with the Human Rights Act 1998. Home Secretary Charles Clarke granted the men only temporary leave to remain in the United Kingdom. This would have placed restrictions on them, including not being able to work or obtain travel documents and being told where to live.

In 2006, Mr Justice Sullivan of the High Court, in S and Others v Secretary of State for the Home Department, ruled that it was unlawful under the 1971 Immigration Act to restrict the men's leave to remain in the United Kingdom, and ordered that they be granted "discretionary leave to remain", which entitled them to work in the United Kingdom. The Home Secretary, John Reid, challenged the ruling in the Court of Appeal, arguing that the Home Office "should have the power to grant only temporary admission to failed asylum seekers who are only allowed to stay in the UK due to their human rights". The Court dismissed the appeal on 4 August 2006.

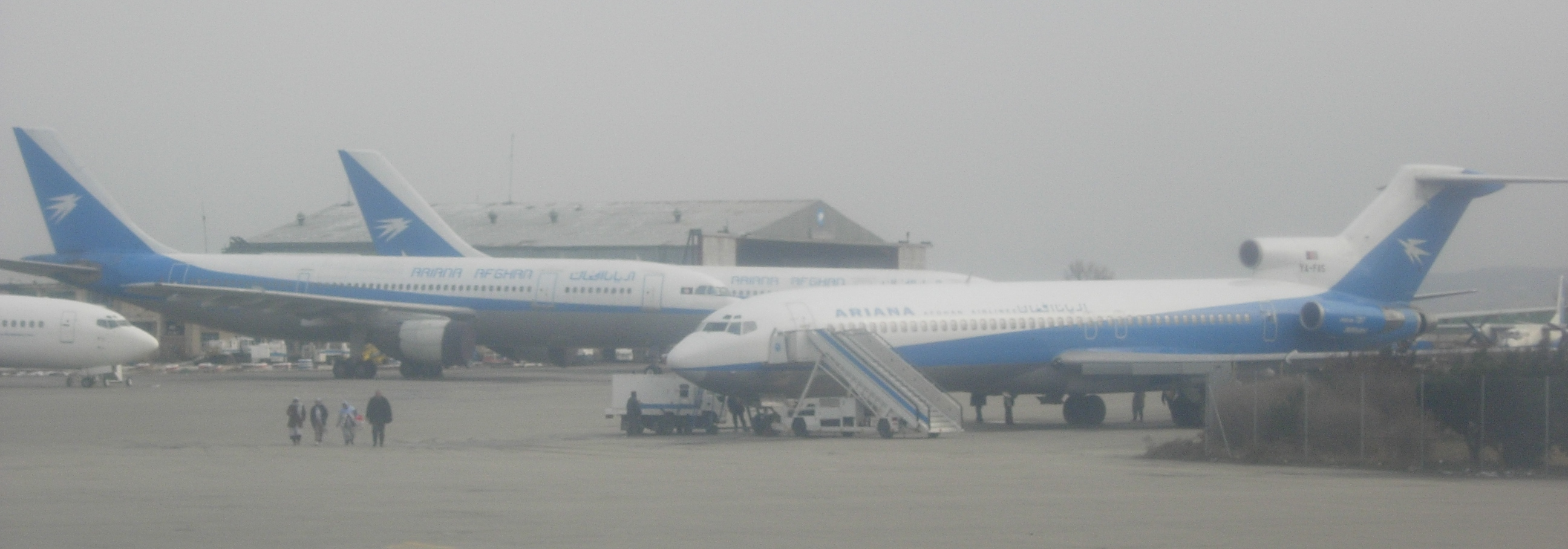
Ariana Afghan Airlines aircraft at Kabul International Airport, Afghanistan. (2007) One of them is a Boeing 727, similar to the aircraft involved.

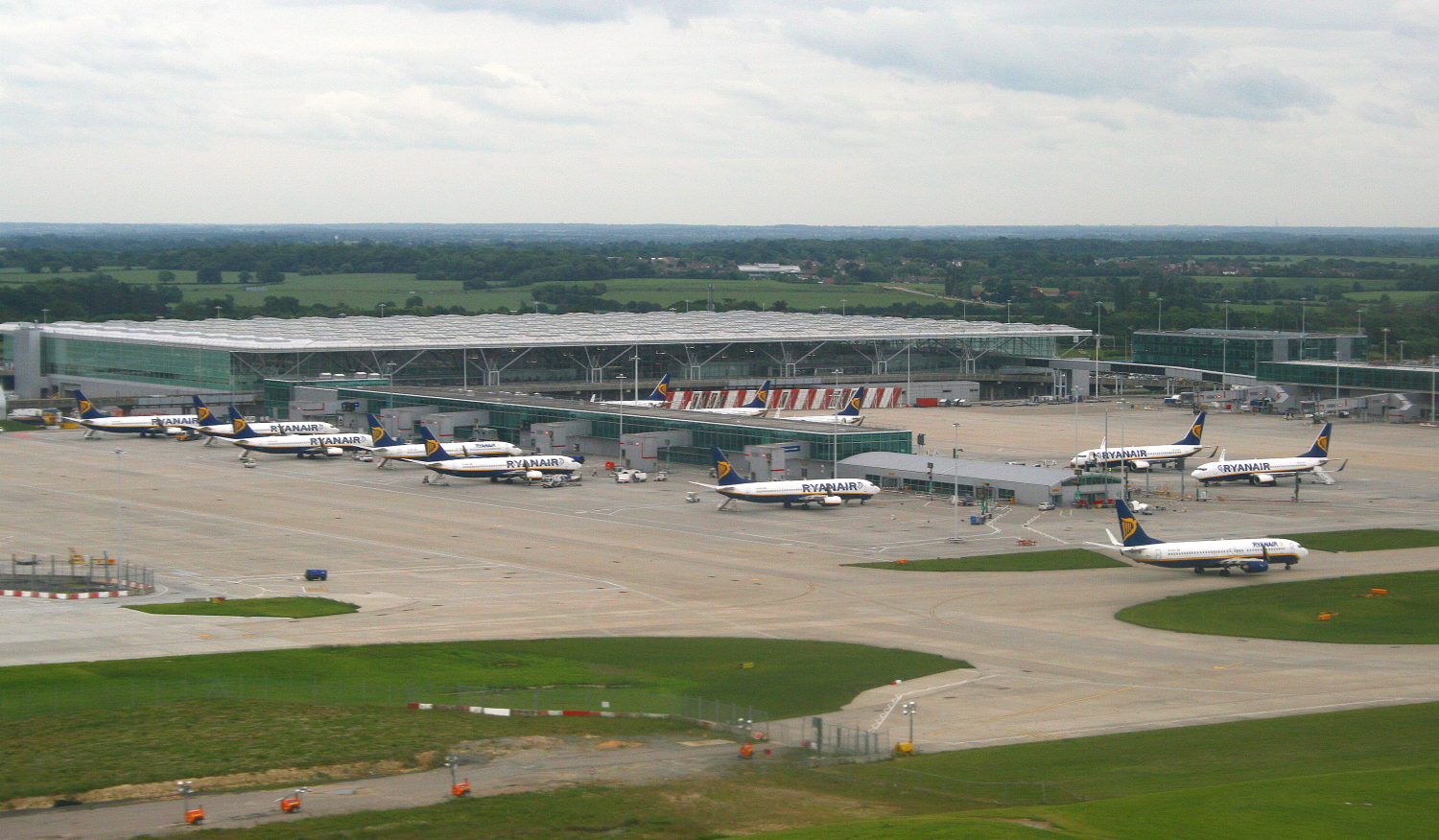
The main terminal building and satellite building three at London Stansted Airport

== Controversy ==
Both major British political parties condemned the ruling. Shadow Home Secretary David Davis said "these hijackers committed serious crimes which should make them incompatible with refugee status" and argued that the problem was of the Labour government's "own creation" due to their introduction of the Human Rights Act 1998.

== See also ==
- Human Rights Act 1998
- Secretary of State for the Home Department
- Political asylum
- Refugee
- Afghan refugees
