= Lamb Inquiry =

British special education inquiry

The Lamb Inquiry (2009) was established as part of the UK government’s response to the House of Commons Education and Skills Committee Report Special Educational Needs: Assessment and Funding. The inquiry was led by Brian Lamb, the chair of the Special Educational Consortium (SEC), who was tasked by the Department of Children’s, Schools, and Families (DCSF) to explore a range of ways in which parental confidence in the Special Educational Needs (SEN) assessment process might be enhanced.

== Aim ==
The main purpose of this inquiry was to look at better ways of including parents, giving them increased access to information and support in their child’s education, along with developing better home/school collaboration around learning. The inquiry looked at the Special Educational Needs System (SEN) and its impact on parental confidence, and collected opinions from a wide range of sample size, including children, parents, teachers and other professionals involved in delivering and managing services.

== Findings ==
Although the Lamb Inquiry found the Special Educational Needs (SEN) Framework to be thorough, it found mixed reviews of that of parental experience. The findings showed while some parents were very positive about the framework, others had experienced countless problems.

== Enactment ==
In order to challenge these issues, The Lamb Inquiry made 51 recommendations to the government to which an implementation plan has been derived. As well as focusing on improving skills and practices within the workforce and specifically on children's outcomes, the plan also focuses heavily on strengthening engagement with parents, ensuring a strategic local approach is made. The implementation plan also includes:

- A clear focus on outcomes
- Strengthening the voice of parents
- Local systems in tune with children’s needs
- Building accountability around children’s progress
- A responsive national framework.

== Statutory changes ==
The Lamb Inquiry (2009) includes two legal amendments: One to provide a right of appeal for parents if a local authority decides not to amend a statement after a review; and the other to place a specific duty on Ofsted to report on the quality of the education provided for disabled children and children with Special Educational Needs (SEN).
