= Tom Cross (barrister) =

British lawyer, podcaster and King's Counsel member

- Citizenship: British
- Education: Birkenhead School; The Queen’s College, Oxford
- Occupations: Barrister; King's Counsel; Podcaster; Judicial Appointments Commissioner
- Years active: 2007-present
- Era: Modern era
- Employer: 11KBW
- Known for: Administrative law
- Notable work: The Protections for Religious Rights, Oxford University Press, 2013. (co-author)
- Website: Official biography

Tom Cross is a British Barrister who is a King's Counsel and serves on the Judicial Appointments Commission. He practises at at 11KBW, London and presents the Cross Examination podcast.

== Early life ==
Cross was born in Liverpool in 1983 and is the eldest of three children. His mother was a PE teacher, and his father was a solicitor. He attended Birkenhead School and studied French and Spanish at The Queen’s College, Oxford. He later completed the law conversion and Bar courses at BPP University, London.

== Career ==
He was called to the Bar in 2007 and was a pupil at Francis Taylor Building, which predominantly practices planning law. He has full rights of audience, and Lincoln's Inn is his Inn of Court. In 2009, he became one of the first judicial assistants at the Supreme Court of the United Kingdom.

He worked alongside Lord Collins of Mapesbury at the nascent Supreme Court, whom he would later describe as "a real lawyers’ lawyer". Writing about his judicial assistant experience in The Times, Cross claimed, "It has confirmed what any aspiring advocate should believe: that the art of advocacy can, and does, make a difference to the results of cases and the development of the law."

He was a research visitor at the Bonavero Institute of Human Rights at the University of Oxford's Faculty of Law during the Michaelmas term of 2021. His work focused on free and compelled speech in the United Kingdom's education system, the efficacy of human rights law in regulating social media activity, and the relationship between the state and the family from a rights perspective.

He works as a barrister at 11KBW, London; practising administrative law, public law, human rights and employment law.

Cross believes that lawyers are duty-bound to explain the law to everyone and presents the Cross Examination podcast, which features a varied range of guests discussing current ethical, social and cultural issues.

Speaking to The Times, he described some barristers' refusal to prosecute peaceful climate change protesters as contrary to the traditional cab rank rule.

Cross was appointed to the King's Counsel on 24 March 2025.

On 1 July 2024, Charles III appointed Cross to the Judicial Appointments Commission for a term of three years.

== Notable cases ==
=== His Majesty's Government ===
Cross was part of the legal team which defended rules precluding long-standing British expatriates living in other European Union countries from voting in the 2016 United Kingdom European Union membership referendum.

He represented Theresa May's government in R (Miller) v Secretary of State for Exiting the European Union, which was heard in the UK's Divisional Court in late 2016 and in the Supreme Court in 2017.

He represented the Secretary of State for Communities and Local Government in Poshteh v Kensington and Chelsea Royal London Borough Council, [2017] which held that duties owed by local authorities under Part VII of the Housing Act 1996 do not constitute civil rights under Article 6 of the European Convention on Human Rights. The Supreme Court dismissed an appeal concerning the refusal of a final accommodation offer.

He acted for the Parole Board for England and Wales in a judicial review of its decision to release John Worboys in 2018.
He represented the Government again in 2021, when the Court of Appeal held that regulations imposing Covid-19 lockdown restrictions were not ultra vires.

In 2017, he represented the Secretary of State for Education in Regina (Interim Executive Board of Al-Hijrah School) v HM Chief Inspector of Education, Children’s Services and Skills. The Secretary of State believed that "separate but equal" sex segregation at Al-Hijrah school, a mixed Orthodox Muslim school, contravened the Equality Act 2010.

He represented the Lord Chancellor, in a claim brought by Lucy Letby’s defence team about whether Letby's defence could have an extra junior advocate. On the day of the hearing, the Lord Chancellor agreed that, given the case's complexity, the United Kingdom's legal aid regulations could allow for an extra junior.

Cross represented the Ministry of Justice in opposition to Stephen Yaxley-Lennon's legal challenge to his segregation from other prisoners at HMP Woodhill. Cross argued that the segregation was fair due to intelligence that indicated a credible threat to the prisoner's safety.

=== Other notable cases ===
He acted for the Royal Borough of Kensington and Chelsea in 2010 in a claim that automated decision-making in the calculation of community care budgets was unlawful. The Court of Appeal decided that local authorities could assess an individual’s needs in that way as the starting point when calculating personal budgets under the Chronically Sick and Disabled Persons Act 1970.

Cross represented West Coast Railways, owners of the Hogwarts Express and the Flying Scotsman in challenging the Office of Rail and Road's refusal to grant an exemption from its central locking train door requirement. West Coast Railways, an operator of heritage trains, often uses Mark 1 coaches that feature the de rigueur hinged or slam doors. A High Court judgment by Mrs Justice Thornton rejected the company's claim that its existing safety procedures were sufficient.

In 2022, he acted for the Attorney-General of Bermuda in a challenge to the constitutionality of a prohibition on same-sex marriage in the territory. The Privy Council found that excluding same-sex marriage under the Domestic Partnership Act 2018 did not breach freedom of conscience or constitutional protections and that Bermuda’s constitution does not prohibit legislation enacted for religious reasons.

In 2024, he acted for Deliveroo when it claimed that its delivery workers did not have a human right to collective bargaining with the food delivery company. The case determined that Deliveroo riders were not in an employment relationship with the organisation. Therefore, they were not entitled to trade union recognition.

Cross represented two claimants who believed that the Care Quality Commission acted irrationally when it registered a private gender clinic for under 18s. In addition to concerns about safeguarding measures, he argued that the commission failed to consider the Cass Review when it registered the clinic.

He represented Sex Matters, which brought a case against The City of London, concerning the segregated swimming facilities at Hampstead Heathh. The gender-critical campaign group claimed that a decision to allow transgender people to choose to swim in the Kenwood Ladies or the Kenwood Men's ponds, depending on how they identified, amounted to sex discrimination. Cross argued that the policy treated women less favourably than men due to a "greater risk of suffering the detriment of her privacy, dignity or safety being compromised".

=== Assisted dying opposition ===
Cross is on the panel of counsel of the Equality and Human Rights Commission. In 2025, he authored a legal opinion for the Christian Institute. The report advised on whether England and Wales' Terminally Ill Adults (End of Life) Bill was compatible with the European Convention on Human Rights.

The fourteen-page document highlighted research published in The Journal of Clinical Psychiatry and The Lancet Psychiatry, which found that thirty to sixty per cent of people with bipolar disorder will attempt suicide at least once and that fifteen to twenty per cent will be successful. It also quoted research into rates of suicidal ideation among people with depression and autism.

The legal opinion expressed the view that a version of the Terminally Ill Adults (End of Life) Bill would, if passed, be incompatible with the rights of certain disabled people under the European Convention on Human Rights.

The Opinion has been relied on by opponents of the Bill in the House of Lords during the terminally ill adults end of life debates.
Cross argued that Article 14 of the European Convention on Human Rights grants special protections to people with disabilities, including protection against discrimination and the right to life. Therefore, the rates of suicidal ideation among people with depression, autism and bipolar disorder place them in a "significantly different situation".

Cross concluded that the member's bill promoted by the Labour MP Kim Leadbetter was not compatible with the European Convention on Human Rights. "That is because, without justification, it contains no adequate safeguard protecting the position of those with disabilities where suicidal ideation is more likely, and who are, because of that feature of their disability, more likely to express a wish to die,"

== Publications ==
The Protections for Religious Rights, Oxford University Press, 2013. (co-author)
