= Special Educational Needs and Disability Act 2001 =

Act of the Parliament of the United Kingdom

Special Educational Needs and Disability Act 2001 (Note: Section 43(1).)
- Act of Parliament
- Parliament of the United Kingdom
- Long title: An Act to amend Part 4 of the Education Act 1996; to make further provision against discrimination, on grounds of disability, in schools and other educational establishments; and for connected purposes.
- Citation: 2001 c. 10
- Territorial extent: England and Wales; Scotland; Northern Ireland (except parts 2 and 3); (Note: Section 43(11)–(12).)

Dates
- Royal assent: 11 May 2001
- Commencement: Various (Note: Section 43(3)–(10).)
Other legislation
Amends	Education Act 1996

Status: Amended

Text of statute as originally enacted

Revised text of statute as amended

The Special Educational Needs and Disability Act 2001 (c. 10), also known as SENDA, is an act of the Parliament of the United Kingdom.

== Background ==
The Disability Discrimination Act 1995 had specifically excluded educational institutions.

== Provisions ==
The act required schools, colleges, universities, adult education providers, statutory youth service and local education authorities to make 'reasonable provisions' to ensure people with disabilities or special needs were provided with the same opportunities as those who were not disabled.

The act stated that discrimination occurred when the educational establishment/body either fails to make reasonable adjustments to accommodate individuals with special needs or a disability, or when they give them less favourable treatment.

The act required educational establishments to make physical modifications to buildings in order to improve accessibility from 2003.

== Further developments ==
The Equality Act 2010 extended the act to encompass neglected indirect discrimination.

== See also ==
- Special Educational Needs and Disability Tribunal
