= Qualified specialist dyslexia teachers =

United Kingdom teachers with specialist SpLD (dyslexia) qualifications

Qualified specialist dyslexia teachers are teachers in the United Kingdom with specialist SpLD (dyslexia) qualifications who are recognised by the Department for Children, Schools and Families as being able to assess and diagnose dyslexia. This was recently confirmed by the Government’s research report (the Rose report in June 2009) on the teaching of children with dyslexia in schools in the UK. The National Health Service also advises assessment by a specialist dyslexia teacher for a diagnosis.

Diplomas and certificates can be obtained through examination boards such as the Oxford, Cambridge and RSA Examinations board (OCR) or university post-graduate qualifications in special educational needs (SpLD).

The training includes the causes of dyslexia, testing and assessment methods for dyslexia, and assessment for examination modifications. Specialist courses also include studying teaching and learning strategies involving practical work with additional research through written assignments. The Rose report also recommended that specialist teachers and or courses have an Associate Membership of the British Dyslexia Association (AMBDA) accreditation to show an approved level of competency in assessing and teaching children with dyslexia.
