= Robert Carnwath, Lord Carnwath of Notting Hill =

English judge

The Right Honourable Lord Carnwath of Notting Hill CVO PC
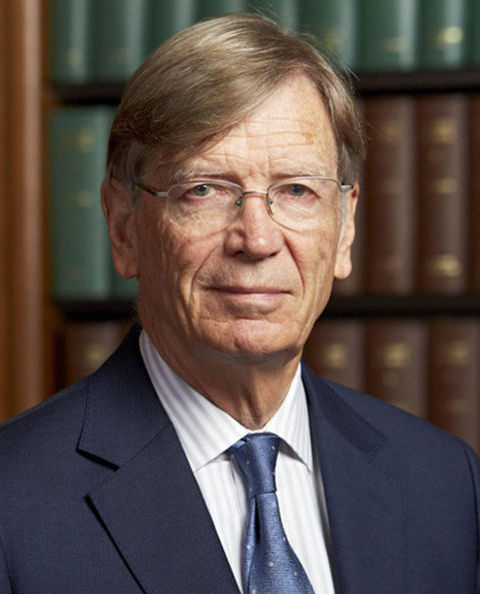

Justice of the Supreme Court of the United Kingdom
- In office 17 April 2012 – 6 March 2020
- Nominated by: Kenneth Clarke
- Appointed by: Elizabeth II
- Preceded by: The Lord Brown of Eaton-under-Heywood
- Succeeded by: Lord Leggatt

Senior President of Tribunals
- In office 12 November 2007 – 17 April 2012
- Preceded by: Inaugural
- Succeeded by: Lord Justice Sullivan

Lord Justice of Appeal
- In office 15 January 2002 – 17 April 2012

Chairman of the Law Commission of England and Wales
- In office 1998 – July 2002
- Preceded by: Lady Justice Arden
- Succeeded by: Lord Justice Toulson

Personal details
- Born: Robert John Anderson Carnwath; 15 March 1945 (age 81)
- Education: Eton College
- Alma mater: Trinity College, Cambridge

Robert John Anderson Carnwath, Lord Carnwath of Notting Hill (born 15 March 1945), is a former British Supreme Court judge.

The son of Sir Andrew Carnwath KCVO, Robert Carnwath was educated at Eton College, where he won the Newcastle Scholarship, and Trinity College, Cambridge.

Carnwath was called to the Bar at Middle Temple in 1968. He practised in parliamentary law, planning and local government, revenue law, and administrative law. He held the appointment of junior counsel to the Inland Revenue (Common Law) from 1980 to 1985, succeeded by Alan Moses, later Lord Justice Moses. He became a Queen's Counsel in 1985, and was Attorney General to the Prince of Wales from 1988 to 1994.

He was appointed as a High Court judge on 3 October 1994, assigned to the Chancery Division, and received the customary knighthood. He served as chairman of the Law Commission from 1999 to July 2002. He was promoted to the Court of Appeal on 15 January 2002 and, as is customary, became a member of the Privy Council. He was sworn in as the first Senior President of Tribunals on 12 November 2007.

On 20 December 2011, Carnwath was announced as an appointee to the Supreme Court of the United Kingdom. By Royal Warrant, all members of the Supreme Court, even if they do not hold a peerage, are entitled to the judicial courtesy title "Lord" for life. Carnwath was granted the judicial courtesy title Lord Carnwath of Notting Hill.

Carnwath is the chairman of the advisory council for the Institute of Advanced Legal Studies. He plays the piano and viola, as well as singing in the Bach Choir.

Lord Carnwath is an honorary professor of law at University College London, an Honorary Fellow of Trinity College, Cambridge and a visiting professor in practice at the Grantham Research Institute at the London School of Economics. He is also currently a Yorke Distinguished Visiting Fellow at the University of Cambridge. Outside the law, he is a keen amateur musician. He is a former governor of the Royal Academy of Music (Hon FRAM) and former chairman of the Britten-Pears Foundation.

== Bibliography ==
- The Court of Appeal from HM Courts Service
- Senior Judiciary List
- Judicial Appointments from 10 Downing Street, 11 September 2001
- Appointments to the Supreme Court from Supreme Court of the United Kingdom, 20 December 2011
