= Lynne Brindley =

British professional librarian (born 1950)

Dame Lynne Brindley DBE FRSA HonFBA
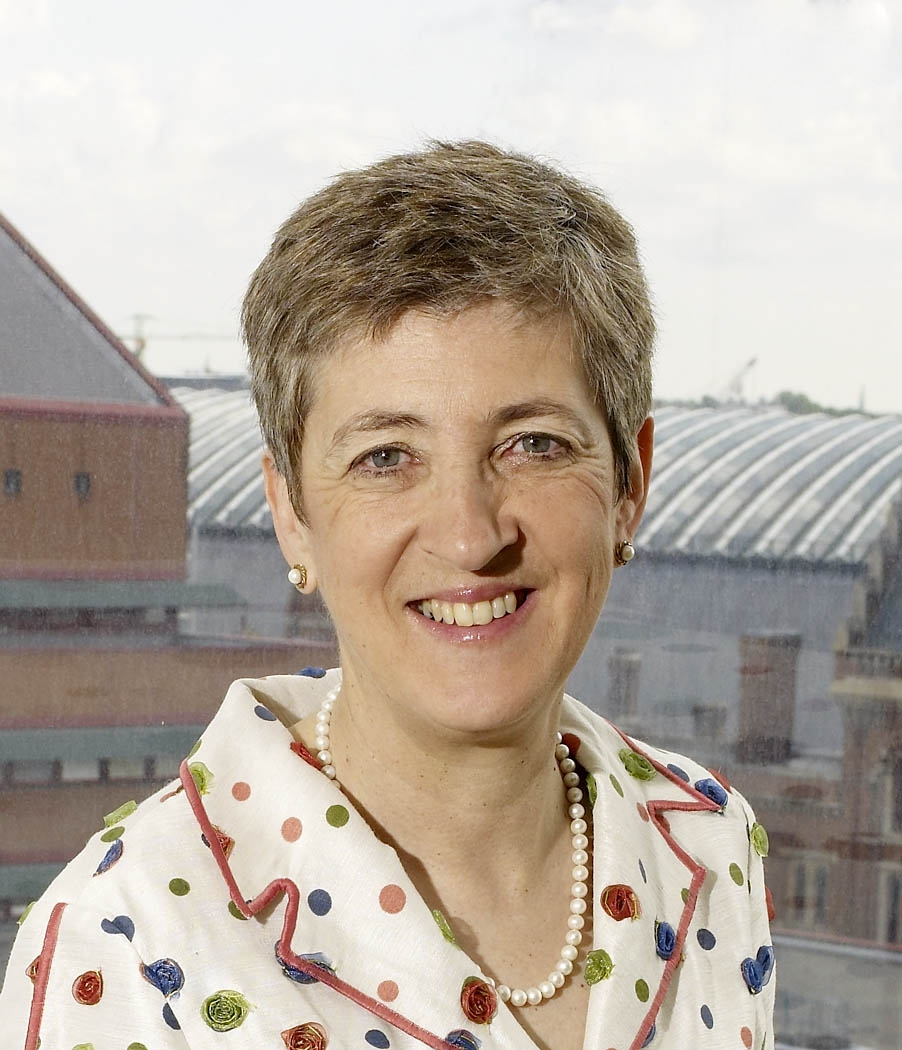
- Brindley in 2008
- Born: 2 July 1950 (age 76)
- Education: University of Reading; University College London
- Awards: DBE (2008); FRSA; HonFBA (2015)

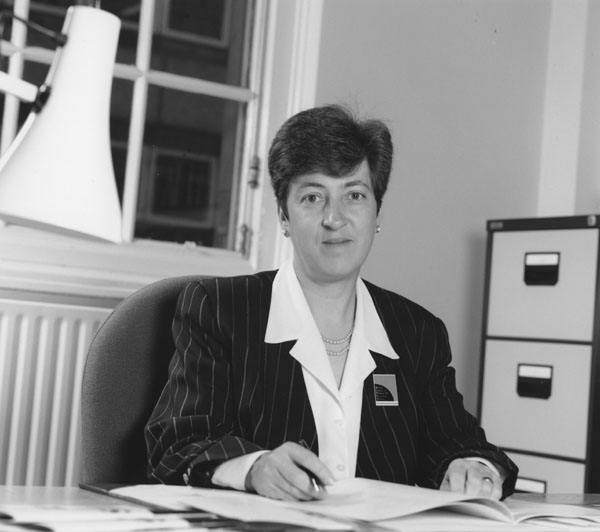
Brindley in the 1990s

Dame Lynne Janie Brindley (born 2 July 1950) is the former Master of Pembroke College, Oxford, a post she held until June 2020. Prior to this appointment she was a professional librarian, and served as the first female chief executive of the British Library, the United Kingdom's national library, from 2000 to 2012.

== Early life and education ==
Brindley gained a first-class degree in music at the University of Reading around 1975 and then began her professional career as a library trainee at the Bodleian Library, University of Oxford. She studied librarianship at the School of Librarianship, University College London, where she was awarded the Sir John MacAlister Medal as top student on her course.

== Career ==
Brindley first worked for the British Library in 1979, in the Bibliographic Services Division and by 1983 she led the chief executive's office. She moved on to be director of library services at the University of Aston, and spent some time as a consultant for KPMG. She was librarian of the British Library of Political and Economic Science at the London School of Economics (LSE), before moving to the University of Leeds as Librarian and Keeper of the Brotherton Collection, and later as Pro Vice-Chancellor.

She became the first female chief executive of the British Library, the United Kingdom's national library, in July 2000 and was founding chair of the Digital Preservation Coalition. She was also a member of the Ofcom board.

On 17 November 2011, Brindley announced that she would be stepping down from her post as Chief Executive at the British Library at the end of July 2012. Brindley became the Master of Pembroke College, Oxford, from 1 August 2013 until June 2020.

In 2021–2022, Brindley served as Prime Warden of the Worshipful Company of Goldsmiths.

=== Context of change ===
A switch from print to digital publishing by the year 2020 was anticipated, which implied that readers would have diminishing physical contact with books. In this context of change, Brindley was committed to ensuring that the Library did not become little more than "a book museum".

Brindley explained:

"Most people are aware that a national switch to digital broadcasting is expected by the end of this decade. Less well known is the fact that a similar trend is underway in the world of publishing: by the year 2020, 40% of UK research monographs will be available in electronic format only, while a further 50% will be produced in both print and digital. A mere 10% of new titles will be available in print alone by 2020."

== Book preservation ==
Brindley's British Library has long been the conservator of historic print collections and regarded as a place of quiet study; but with the explosion of the internet and electronic publishing, users are increasingly turning their backs on libraries as a physical space, using them as virtual, digital environments instead. In this context, the British Library's role in warehousing large book collections is at risk.

== Research ==
Brindley accords special priority to the needs of researchers and believes that libraries should also play a key role in helping to teach information literacy skills. In this context, Brindley observed:

"[That t]he younger generation is technologically more literate but not more information literate is a challenge that must be tackled by libraries and education more widely. Students who simply want to use Google and take what it says as gospel do a real disservice to the skills people will increasingly need to survive in the digital economy. Libraries add a degree of sophistication, support and richness of content, all of which will encourage creativity, quality research and participation of the citizen in the global digital world that we are in."

== Academic awards ==
Brindley has received honorary degrees of D.Litt. from the University of Leicester on 11 July 2002, the University of Reading in 2004 and the University of Leeds on 14 July 2006. In April 2006 she was awarded an honorary degree from The Open University as Doctor of the University for "Public services and exceptional contribution to the educational or cultural well-being of society".

A full list follows:

- UCL – Hon. Fellow 2002
- Nottingham Trent – Hon. D.Litt. 2001
- Oxford – Hon. D.Litt. 2002
- Leicester – Hon. D.Litt. 2002
- London Guildhall – Hon. D.Litt. 2002
- Reading – 2004
- Sheffield – 2004
- City – Hon. D.Sc. 2005
- Leeds – Hon. D.Litt. 2006
- Open University – Hon. D.Litt. 2006
- University of Wales, Aberystwyth – Hon. Fellow 2007
- Aston University – Hon. D.Litt. 2008
- University of Manchester – Hon. D.Litt. 2011

== Honours ==
Brindley is a Fellow of the Royal Society of Arts (FRSA). She was appointed a Dame Commander of the Order of the British Empire (DBE) in the 2008 New Year Honours List for services to education. On 16 July 2015, she was elected an honorary fellow of the British Academy (HonFBA). In 2009, she won the National Information Standards Organization (NISO)'s Miles Conrad Award.

== Sources ==
- Brindley, Lynne. "Comment: All this for the price of a latte and a muffin...; We cannot allow the British Library's peerless collection to be put at risk by potential funding" The Guardian. 23 September 2007
- Christiansen, Rupert. "A fine collection of headaches; Rupert Christiansen looks at the ups and downs of the British Library" Telegraph (London). 30 August 2006
- Curtis, Polly. "MPs push for online research library" The Guardian (Manchester). 9 July 2002
- Davies, Gareth Huw. "Bringing Bill Gates to book: A week in the life of Lynne Brindley", timesonline.co.uk, 4 March 2007
- Day, Julia. "British Library seeks marketing head", Guardian.co.uk, 16 February 2001.
- Deeble, Sandra. "My work space: Lynne Brindley is the first woman – and the first librarian – to head up the British Library. She talks to Sandra Deeble about the places that inspire her" The Guardian (Manchester). 14 August 2004
- English, Shirley. "Library's archive fund gets £6.5m" The Times (London). 3 March 2004
- Ezard, John. "Anger grows after British Library junks rare books" The Guardian (Manchester). 12 August 2000.
- Ezard, John. "British Library halts dumping of newspapers" The Guardian (Manchester). 24 November 2000
- Brindley, Lynne. Response – "Letter: Open book" The Guardian (Manchester). 27 November 2000
- McKie, David. "Library brought to book; The British Library is destroying thousands of books because it is short of space. But, asks David McKie, who decides which ones?" Guardian (Manchester). 14 August 2000
- Hunt, Tristram. "Comment: Scholarly squeeze; Allowing undergraduates into the British Library's reading rooms has led to exclusion, not inclusion" The Guardian (Manchester). 29 May 2006
- Brindley, Lynne. Response – "Letters: The 'undergraduate masses' have not squeezed out our readers; The British Library has turned its back on elitism and can cope with its new influx, says Lynne Brindley" The Guardian (Manchester). 1 June 2006
- McLeod, Donald. "British Library puts sound archive online" The Guardian (Manchester). 16 April 2004
- McLeod, Donald. "Websites get legal place in national archive" The Guardian (Manchester). 4 November 2003
- Reynolds, Nigel. "Library to halt sale of historic journals" The Telegraph (London). 6 December 2000
- Reynolds, Nigel. "Staff culled as the British Library goes digital" The Telegraph (London). 24 November 2000
- Secher, Benjamin. "My week: Lynne Brindley, Chief executive, British Library; Inside the day-to-day life of Britain's cultural movers and shakers" The Telegraph (London). 27 September 2004
- Tran, Mark. "Microsoft teams up with British Library to digitise books" The Guardian (Manchester). 4 November 2005
- "Woman to head British Library" The Guardian (Manchester). 9 February 2000
- Young, Ken. "Reading between the lines: The British Library is working fast to upgrade its research services in the midst of a worldwide debate over open source publishing" The Guardian (Manchester). 16 December 2004

Academic offices
Preceded by Giles Henderson	Master of Pembroke College, Oxford; 2013–2020	Succeeded by Ernest Ryder
