= Ceylan Yeğinsu =

Turkish-British journalist

Ceylan Yeğinsu (born 14 February 1986) is a Turkish-British journalist and currently a staff reporter for The New York Times.

== Early life and background ==
Yeğinsu was born in Istanbul, Turkey and is bi-lingual in English and Turkish. She was educated at Woldingham School, Rugby School, and the University of Leeds. Her brother is the international lawyer and barrister Prof. Can Yeğinsu.

== Career ==
Yeğinsu began her journalism career in 2008 as a reporter and editor for Hurriyet Daily News, where she covered politics, culture, business and sport. She also ran a weekly column on issues of gender equality in Turkey. In 2011, she received a master's degree in Digital Media at the Columbia University Graduate School of Journalism and was awarded the Brigid O'Hara-Forster Fellowship. As a freelance reporter and multimedia journalist in New York and Istanbul, she worked for publications including The Atlantic, The Economist, Huffington Post, International Business Times.

In 2013, Yeğinsu joined the New York Times' Istanbul Bureau. In September 2014, she ran a front-page story on ISIL's recruitment of Turks in the Hacıbayram neighborhood of Ankara. Her report was heavily criticized by President Recep Tayyip Erdoğan, who called the story "shameless, ignoble, treason." Yeğinsu was subsequently attacked by the newspaper Star and other pro-government media, and received multiple death threats. The resulting intimidation campaign against Yeğinsu forced her to temporarily leave the country. The directors of Reporters Without Borders, Article 19 and the English PEN published an open letter, reminding President Erdoğan of journalists significant role in a democracy and their protection in both Turkish and international law. The U.S. State Department criticized Turkey for these attempts of intimidation and threat.

Yeğinsu has since worked in the London bureau as an international correspondent and in 2020 joined the travel desk as a staff reporter.
