= James Dingemans =

British judge

The Right Honourable Lord Justice Dingemans

Lord Justice of Appeal
- Incumbent
- Assumed office 21 October 2019
- Monarchs: Elizabeth II; Charles III

Justice of the High Court
- In office 10 June 2013 – 21 October 2019

Personal details
- Born: 25 June 1964 (age 61)

Sir James Michael Dingemans (born 25 June 1964), styled The Rt Hon Lord Justice Dingemans, is a judge of the Court of Appeal, having previously served as a High Court judge. He was appointed Senior President of Tribunals for a five-year period from 1 August 2025.

== Legal career ==
Dingemans was called to the bar at Inner Temple in 1987. He practised from Chambers at 3 Hare Court. He became a Queen's Counsel and a Recorder in 2002 and was approved to sit as a deputy High Court judge from 2010.

On 10 June 2013, he was appointed a High Court judge, receiving the customary knighthood in 2014, and assigned to the Queen's Bench Division.

On 13 November 2015, he presided over the sentencing for the murder of Becky Watts. Nathan Matthews was sentenced to life imprisonment with a minimum term of 33 years for murder, while Shauna Hoare was sentenced to 17 years imprisonment for manslaughter. At the end of the sentencing hearing, Dingemans wept as he paid tribute to the Watts' family for their courage and dignity.

On 21 October 2019, he was appointed to the Court of Appeal as a Lord Justice of Appeal and has since 5 February 2020 been vice-president of the King's Bench Division.

He is the co-author, with Can Yeğinsu, Tom Cross (barrister), and Hafsah Masood of a leading textbook The Protections for Religious Rights: Law and Practice, published by Oxford University Press.
