= Can Yeğinsu =

Barrister and international lawyer (born 1980)

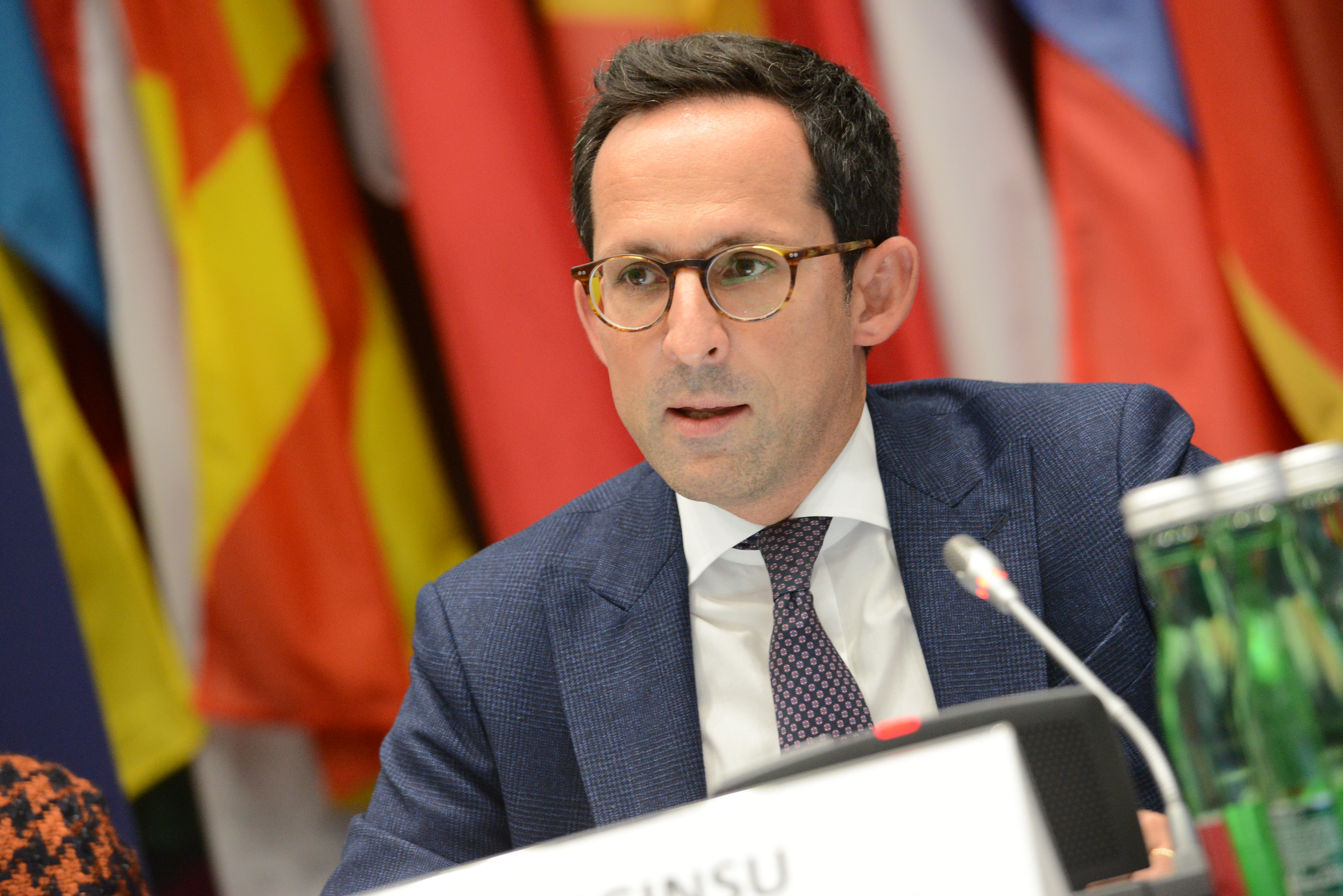
- Yeğinsu at the OSCE in 2023
- Born: Vedat Can Yeğinsu; 12 November 1980 (age 45); Istanbul, Turkey
- Citizenship: United Kingdom; Turkey
- Education: University College, Oxford; Princeton University; Harvard Law School
- Occupation(s): Barrister, Academic, Lawyer.
- Employer: 3 Verulam Buildings
- Organization: The High Level Panel of Legal Experts on Media Freedom
- Known for: Expertise in commercial law, international law, international arbitration, human rights and civil liberties
- Title: Deputy Chair of the High Level Panel of Legal Experts on Media Freedom
- Predecessor: Amal Clooney

Vedat Can Yeğinsu (born 12 November 1980) is an English barrister and international lawyer who practises from 3 Verulam Buildings Chambers in London and specialises in commercial law, international arbitration, human rights, and international law. He is also a member of the faculty at Columbia Law School, Georgetown University Law Center, and Koç University Law School, where he teaches courses on international law, international arbitration, human rights, and international dispute settlement.

Yeğinsu appears as an advocate in cases before the English Courts, as well before international courts and tribunals. He has represented several high-profile clients, including the Wikimedia Foundation, Nobel Peace Laureate Maria Ressa, the broadcaster Radio Free Europe/Radio Liberty, the UN High Commissioner for Human Rights, and the Egyptian human rights activist Alaa Abd El-Fattah.

In 2022, Yeğinsu was appointed by Lord Neuberger of Abbotsbury as Deputy Chair of the High Level Panel of Legal Experts on Media Freedom, taking over the role from Amal Clooney. He is an executive council member of the American Society of International Law, and sits as a trustee of English PEN, Reporters Without Borders, and the Thomson Reuters Foundation.

== Early life and education ==
Yeğinsu was born in Istanbul, Turkey. His sister Ceylan Yeğinsu is The New York Times international correspondent. He was educated at King's College School in Wimbledon, where his classmates included the actors Khalid Abdalla, Ben Barnes, and Tom Basden.

Yeğinsu then read English Language and Literature at University College, Oxford, where he was a College Scholar and recipient of the Stephen Boyd Memorial Prize for the top first in finals. In 2002 he graduated from Oxford with a double first-class degree and was awarded the Jane Eliza Procter Fellowship to Princeton University, where he studied and taught the works of William Shakespeare, John Milton, and became acquainted with Turkish Nobel Laureate Orhan Pamuk.

After a period of writing and working as a management consultant, Yeğinsu retrained as a lawyer, graduating with the top first class Bachelor of Laws degree from City, University of London, before enrolling at Harvard Law School to study for a Master of Laws. At Harvard Law School, Yeğinsu was an editor of the Harvard International Law Journal and in 2008 became the first student of Turkish origin to give the Harvard Law School commencement speech.

== Legal and academic career ==
In 2007, Yeğinsu was called to the Bar at Inner Temple, where he received a Princess Royal Scholarship. After a short period of working at the Permanent Mission of Turkey to the United Nations, he undertook pupillage and started legal practice in 2009 from 4 New Square Chambers in Lincoln's Inn, a commercial set of chambers headed by Sue Carr, Baroness Carr of Walton-on-the-Hill. In 2022, he moved his practice to 3 Verulam Buildings in Gray's Inn.

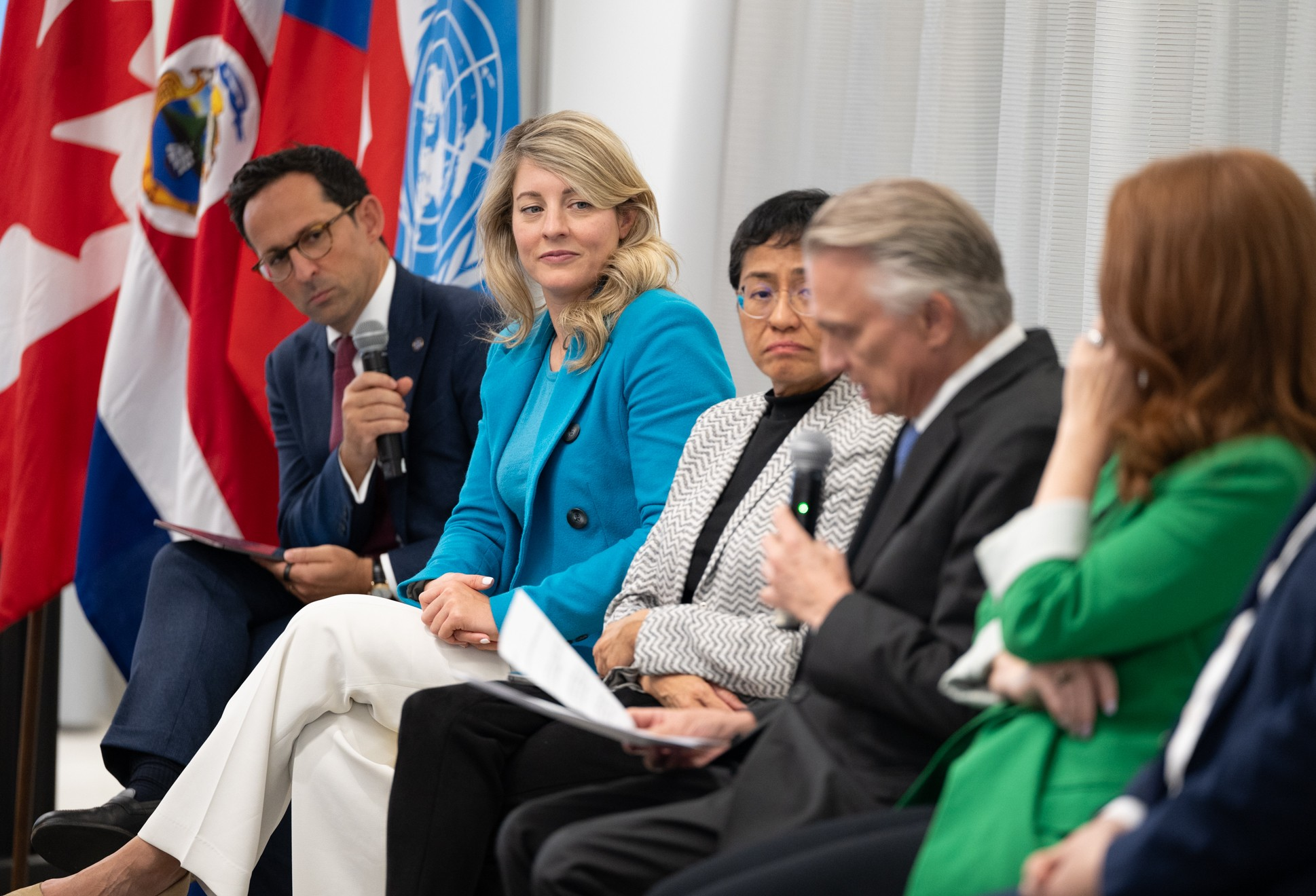
Yeğinsu (left) with Canadian foreign minister Mélanie Joly, Nobel Peace Laureate Maria Ressa, and Costa Rican foreign minister Arnoldo André Tinoco at the United Nations in New York in 2024.

Yeğinsu has appeared as counsel before all levels of the English Courts. In 2010, he became the first barrister of Turkish origin to appear before the UK Supreme Court, and has since appeared in that court as well as in matters before the Court of Appeal (England and Wales), the European Court of Human Rights, the Inter-American Court of Human Rights, the ECOWAS Court, as well as before various United Nations bodies and international arbitral bodies.

As a barrister, Yeğinsu has acted for multinational corporations, financial services companies and UN states, as well as media companies, international organizations, non-governmental organizations, and individuals (including human rights defenders and journalists). High-profile clients include the Wikimedia Foundation, Nobel Peace Laureate Maria Ressa, the broadcaster Radio Free Europe/Radio Liberty, the UN High Commissioner for Human Rights, and the Egyptian human rights activist Alaa Abd El-Fattah. He is recognised and has won a number of awards for his work in international arbitration and international law.

As an academic, Yeğinsu teaches courses in international investment law and ICSID arbitration at Georgetown University Law Center, as well as a course on human rights and international arbitration with European Court of Human Rights President Róbert Ragnar Spanó. At Columbia Law School, he teaches international human rights law, is a senior fellow of the law school's Human Rights Institute, is a Fellow of the law school's International Claims and Reparations Project, and serves as an expert at Columbia University's Global Freedom of Expression. Yeğinsu is also a long-standing member of the law faculty at Koç University in Istanbul where he teaches public international law, and is a fellow at the Lauterpacht Centre for International Law at University of Cambridge.

== International law ==
Yeğinsu has engaged in advisory work for numerous national governments and international organisations on matters of international law. He has addressed the Media Freedom Coalition of States, the Council of Europe, the Organization for Security and Co-operation in Europe, UNESCO, and participated as a speaker at sessions of the United Nations.

In 2022, Yeğinsu was appointed by Lord Neuberger of Abbotsbury as Deputy Chair of the High Level Panel of Legal Experts on Media Freedom, taking over the role from Amal Clooney.

== Published works ==
Yeğinsu is an occasional contributor to The Financial Times, The New York Review of Books, The Times Literary Supplement, and Just Security, as well as to Turkey's Radikal newspaper. His academic works include:

- The Protections for Religious Rights: Law and Practice, author with Sir James Dingemans (Oxford University Press, 2013).
- The General International Law in International Investment Law: A Commentary, contributor (Oxford University Press, 2024).
- Jervis on Coroners, contributor (Sweet & Maxwell, 2019, 2024).
- The Investment Treaty Arbitration Review, contributor (2018, 2019, 2020, 2021, 2022, 2023, 2024).
- Reflections on International Arbitration: Essays in Honour of Professor George Bermann, contributor (Juris, 2022).

== See also ==
- List of British Turks
