= Special Educational Needs and Disability Tribunal =

The Special Educational Needs and Disability Tribunal is a first-tier tribunal that is part of His Majesty's Courts and Tribunals Service, an executive agency of the Ministry of Justice of the United Kingdom.

It provides a route to appeal decisions made by local authorities regarding children's special educational needs and disability accommodation.

== See also ==
- Special Educational Needs and Disability Act 2001
