= Judicial Appointments Commission =

Body selecting judicial candidates in England and Wales

The Judicial Appointments Commission (JAC) is an independent commission that selects candidates for judicial office in courts and tribunals in England and Wales and for some tribunals whose jurisdiction extends to Scotland or Northern Ireland.

== Synopsis ==
The JAC recommends candidates for appointment as judges of the High Court and to all judicial offices listed in Schedule 14 of the Constitutional Reform Act 2005. It also provides support for selections to fill judicial posts that lie outside its responsibilities under Schedule 14. For example, the JAC convenes panels that recommend candidates for appointment to senior posts such as the Lord Chief Justice of England and Wales, Master of the Rolls, President of the King's Bench Division, President of the Family Division, Chancellor of the High Court and Lords Justices of Appeal. The JAC is not responsible for selecting justices of the Supreme Court of the United Kingdom although a lay Commissioner does sit on the selection panel. Additionally, the Lord Chancellor may request the JAC's assistance in connection with other appointments that the Lord Chancellor considers appropriate.

The JAC is a non-departmental public body which was created on 3 April 2006 through the Constitutional Reform Act 2005. It took over a responsibility previously held by the Lord Chancellor and the Department for Constitutional Affairs (previously the Lord Chancellor's Department), although the Lord Chancellor retains responsibility for appointing some selected candidates. In other cases the Lord Chief Justice or the Senior President of Tribunals makes the final appointments.

The Appropriate Authority (either the Lord Chancellor, Lord Chief Justice or Senior President of Tribunals) can accept or reject a JAC recommendation, or ask the Commission to reconsider it. If the Appropriate Authority rejects a recommendation or asks for reconsideration they must provide written reasons to the JAC.

Under the Constitutional Reform Act, the Lord Chancellor also lost his other judicial functions, including the right to sit as a judge in the House of Lords. The Act also established the Lord Chief Justice as head of the judiciary of England and Wales. The Act has since been amended by the Crime and Courts Act 2013.

Under the Constitutional Reform Act Parliament gave the JAC the following statutory duties:

- to select candidates solely on merit;
- to select only people of good character; and
- to have regard to the need to encourage diversity in the range of persons available for judicial selection.

== Members ==
The Judicial Appointments Commission comprises 15 commissioners. Twelve, including the Chairman, are appointed through open competition, with the other three selected by the Judges' Council (two senior members of the courts judiciary) or the Tribunal Judges' Council (one senior member of the tribunals judiciary).

The Chairman of the Commission must always be a lay member. Of the 14 other Commissioners:

- 6 must be judicial members (of which two must be tribunal judges)
- 2 must be professional members (each of whom must hold a qualification listed below but must not hold the same qualification as each other*)
- 5 must be lay members
- 1 must be a non-legally qualified judicial member

The legal qualifications referred to are:

- Barrister in England and Wales;
- Solicitor of the Senior Courts of England and Wales; or
- Fellow of the Chartered Institute of Legal Executives

The members of the Commission (as at 1 June 2023) are:

Chairman:

- Vacant

Vice Chairman:

- Rt. Hon. Lord Justice Warby (senior judicial; appt. 1 June 2023)

Professional members:

- Brie Stevens-Hoare, KC (appt. 9 Apr 2018, re-appt. 9 Apr 2021)
- Sarah Lee (solicitor) (appt. 9 Apr 2018, re-appt. 9 Apr 2021)

Judicial members:

- Tan Ikram (appt. 14 December 2023)
- Judge Anuja Dhir (appt. 9 June 2018, re-appt. 9 June 2021)
- District Judge Mathu Asokan (appt. 1 Sep 2017, re-appt. 1 Sep 2020)
- Mr. Justice Adam Johnson

of which Tribunal members:

- Greg Sinfield (appt. 9 June 2020)
- Christa Christensen (appt. 6 July 2020)

Lay justice:

- Emir Khan Feisal, JP (appt. 1 Sep 2017, re-appt. 1 Sep 2020)

Lay members:

- Jane Furniss CBE (appt. 1 Sep 2017, re-appt. 1 Sep 2020)
- Sue Hoyle (appt. 1 Aug 2019)
- Andrew Kennon (appt. 1 Sep 2017, re-appt. 1 Sep 2020)
- Professor Sir Simon Wessely (appt. 1 Sep 2017, re-appt. 1 Sep 2020)
- (Former archbishop) Barry Morgan (appt. 6 July 2020)

== Staff ==
The JAC has a staff of around 50 public servants.

The Chief Executive is Alex McMurtrie, with Jessica Prandle as Deputy Chief Executive and Rob Aldridge as Head of Operations and Digital.

== Related bodies ==
The Judicial Appointments Commission is separate from the Commission for Judicial Appointments (CJA). The CJA was established in March 2001 to review the procedures for the appointment of judges and QCs, and to investigate complaints into those procedures. It closed on 31 March 2006 with the establishment of the Judicial Appointments Commission and the Judicial Appointments and Conduct Ombudsman (JACO). A separate Judicial Appointments Board for Scotland and Northern Ireland Judicial Appointments Commission undertake similar functions for Scotland and Northern Ireland, respectively.

== Criticism ==
The Judicial Appointments Commission has been criticised for having too much power over judicial appointments at the expense of ministers. Robert Hazell and Timothy Foot have argued that the JAC's set-up means that any ministerial discretion in the choice of judges is purely nominal, with the JAC being the final appointer. Richard Ekins and Graham Gee have proposed amending the Constitutional Reform Act 2005 to restore a meaningful choice over judicial candidates to the Lord Chancellor.

== See also ==
- Appointment process for the Supreme Court of the United Kingdom
