= Ernest Ryder =

British judge (born 1957)

The Right Honourable Sir Ernest Ryder TD DL
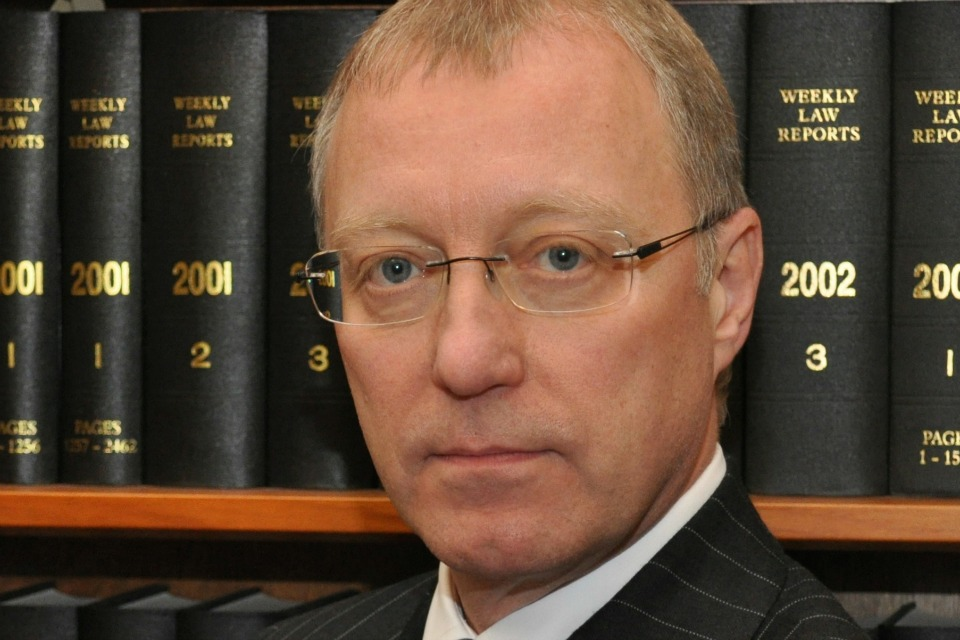
- Lord Justice Ryder in 2013

Master of Pembroke College, Oxford
- Incumbent
- Assumed office July 2020
- Preceded by: Lynne Brindley

Sir Ernest Nigel Ryder, TD, PC, DL (born 9 December 1957) became a Lord Justice of Appeal in April 2013 and was appointed Senior President of Tribunals in September 2015. In July 2020, Ryder became the Master of Pembroke College, Oxford.

== Education and family life ==
Ryder was educated at Bolton School and Peterhouse, Cambridge, and worked for the merchant bank, Grindley Brandt & Co 1979–81, before qualifying as a barrister.

He married Janette Martin in 1990, and they have one daughter.

== Career ==
=== Legal career ===
Ryder was called to the Bar in 1981 and was appointed Queen's Counsel in 1997. He became a Recorder in 2000, and a Deputy High Court Judge in 2001. Ryder was appointed a High Court judge in 2004, receiving the customary knighthood, and was allocated to the Family Division. On 9 April 2013, he was promoted Lord Justice of Appeal, consequently being sworn of the Privy Council.

Ryder was appointed to the post of Judge in Charge of Modernisation of Family Justice in November 2011, and under his stewardship published the Judicial Proposals for the modernisation of family justice in July 2012. Many of the recommendations were implemented by the Children and Families Act 2014, including a 26-week time limit for determination of care and supervision proceedings.

In July 2015 it was announced that Ryder had been appointed Senior President of Tribunals with effect from 18 September 2015. He retired from that role on 19 September 2020.

Ryder has been involved in a number of notable cases. He was lead counsel for a respondent mother in the leading domestic violence child contact order case, Re LVNH (Children) (Contact: Domestic Violence) [2001]. He was Counsel to the North Wales Tribunal of Inquiry 1996–99.

=== Academic career ===
He was appointed as a Trustee of the Nuffield Foundation in September 2014.

In January 2014, he was installed as Chancellor of the University of Bolton.

In January 2020, he was elected as the next master of Pembroke College, Oxford. He took up the post in July 2020, in succession to Dame Lynne Brindley.

=== Military service ===
Ryder has served as a Territorial Army officer in the Duke of Lancaster's Own Yeomanry (later Royal Mercian and Lancastrian Yeomanry) and received the Territorial Decoration in 1996.

== Honours ==
He received a Deputy Lieutenant of Oxfordshire Commission on 26 May 2023.

Academic offices
Preceded by Lynne Brindley	Master of Pembroke College, Oxford; 2020–	Succeeded by incumbent
