= Senior President of Tribunals =

Senior British judge who presides over the UK tribunal system

- The Judiciary of England and Wales
- Incumbent; Sir James Dingemans since 1 August 2025
- Style: The Right Honourable
- Nominator: Judicial Appointments Commission
- Appointer: Monarch of the United Kingdom, on the recommendation of the Prime Minister and Lord Chancellor
- Inaugural holder: Lord Justice Carnwarth
- Formation: 19 July 2007
- Website: https://www.judiciary.uk/about-the-judiciary/lord-chief-justice/

The Senior President of Tribunals is a senior judge in the United Kingdom who presides over the UK tribunal system. The Senior President is appointed by the monarch of the United Kingdom on the advice of the Lord Chancellor following the recommendation of an independent selection panel under the auspices of the Judicial Appointments Commission. Lord Justice Carnwath was appointed as the first holder of the post on 12 November 2007. The Senior President must satisfy the judicial-appointment eligibility condition on a seven-year basis, or have had similar experience in Scotland or Northern Ireland. The Senior President must have regard to the need for the following:

- Tribunals to be accessible
- Proceedings before tribunals to be fair and handled quickly and efficiently
- Members of tribunals to be experts in the subject-matter of, or the law to be applied in, cases in which they decide matters—and the need to develop innovative methods of resolving disputes that are of a type that may be brought before tribunals.

The Senior President of Tribunals can make representations to the Parliament of the United Kingdom about tribunal members and the administration of justice by tribunals. The Senior President can also represent the views of tribunal members to Parliament, the Lord Chancellor and government ministers.

== List of Senior Presidents ==
- 12 November 2007: Sir Robert Carnwath
- 25 June 2012: Sir Jeremy Sullivan
- 18 September 2015: Sir Ernest Ryder
- 19 September 2020: Sir Keith Lindblom
- 1 August 2025: Sir James Dingemans

== See also ==
- President of the Supreme Court of the United Kingdom
