= Theresa May =

Prime Minister of the United Kingdom from 2016 to 2019

The Right Honourable The Baroness May of Maidenhead PC
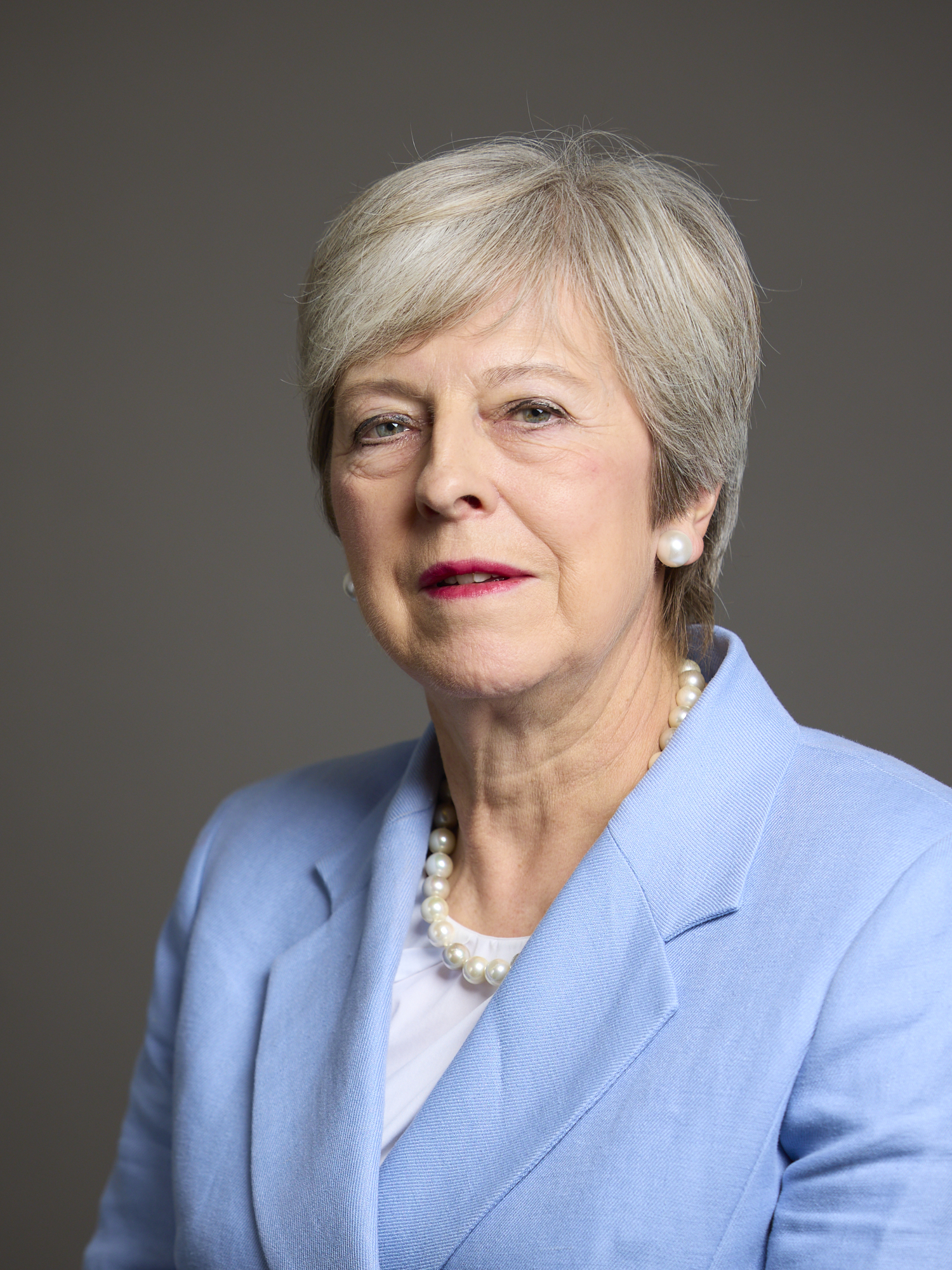
- Official portrait, 2024

Prime Minister of the United Kingdom
- In office 13 July 2016 – 24 July 2019
- Monarch: Elizabeth II
- First Secretary: Damian Green (2017)
- Preceded by: David Cameron
- Succeeded by: Boris Johnson
Ministerial offices
Home Secretary
In office 12 May 2010 – 13 July 2016
Prime Minister	David Cameron
Preceded by	Alan Johnson
Succeeded by	Amber Rudd
Minister for Women and Equalities
In office 12 May 2010 – 4 September 2012
Prime Minister	David Cameron
Preceded by	Harriet Harman
Succeeded by	Maria Miller
Party political offices
Leader of the Conservative Party
In office 11 July 2016 – 23 July 2019^{[nb]}
Preceded by	David Cameron
Succeeded by	Boris Johnson
Chairman of the Conservative Party
In office 23 July 2002 – 6 November 2003
Leader	Iain Duncan Smith
Preceded by	David Davis
Succeeded by	Liam Fox; The Lord Saatchi
Shadow cabinet portfolios
1999–2001	Education and Employment; Women
2001–2002	Transport, Local Government and the Regions
2003–2004	Environment, Food and Rural Affairs
2004–2005	Family
2005	Culture, Media and Sport
2005–2009	Leader of the House of Commons
2007–2010	Women and Equality
2009–2010	Work and Pensions

Member of the House of Lords
- Lord Temporal
- Life peerage 21 August 2024

Member of Parliament for Maidenhead
- In office 1 May 1997 – 30 May 2024
- Preceded by: Constituency established
- Succeeded by: Joshua Reynolds

Personal details
- Born: Theresa Mary Brasier; 1 October 1956 (age 70) Eastbourne, East Sussex, England
- Party: Conservative
- Spouse: Philip May (m. 1980)
- Relatives: Alistair Strathern (first cousin once removed)
- Education: St Hugh's College, Oxford (BA)
- Website: Official website
- Theresa May's voice May's speech after the 2017 general election Recorded 9 June 2017
- Note: Acting: 7 June – 23 July 2019

Theresa Mary May, Baroness May of Maidenhead (/təˈriːzə/; née Brasier; born 1 October 1956), is a British politician who served as Prime Minister of the United Kingdom and Leader of the Conservative Party from 2016 to 2019. She previously served as Home Secretary from 2010 to 2016. She was Member of Parliament (MP) for Maidenhead from 1997 to 2024, and has been a member of the House of Lords since August 2024. May was the second female British prime minister, after Margaret Thatcher, and the first woman to have held two of the Great Offices of State. May is a one-nation conservative.

May grew up in Oxfordshire and attended St Hugh's College, Oxford. After graduating in 1977, she worked at the Bank of England and the Association for Payment Clearing Services. She also served as a councillor on Merton London Borough Council. After two unsuccessful attempts to be elected to the House of Commons, she was elected MP for Maidenhead at the 1997 general election. From 1999 to 2010, May held several roles in shadow cabinets and was Chairman of the Conservative Party from 2002 to 2003. Following the formation of the coalition government after the 2010 general election, May was appointed home secretary and minister for women and equalities, giving up the latter role in 2012. Reappointed after the Conservatives won the 2015 general election, she became the longest-serving home secretary in more than 60 years. During her tenure as home secretary, she pursued reform of the Police Federation, implemented a harder line on drugs policy and further restricted immigration. She oversaw the introduction of elected police and crime commissioners, the deportation of Abu Qatada and the creation of the College of Policing and the National Crime Agency. Although she supported the Remain campaign, May supported Brexit following the outcome of the 2016 referendum. She was elected and appointed prime minister unopposed, succeeding David Cameron.

As prime minister, May began the process of withdrawing the UK from the EU, triggering Article 50 in March 2017. In April, she announced a snap general election, with the aim of strengthening her hand in Brexit negotiations and highlighting her "strong and stable" leadership. This resulted in a hung parliament with the number of Conservative seats reduced to 317 from 330, despite the highest vote share since 1983 and the largest increase in electoral support enjoyed by a governing party since 1832. The loss of an overall majority prompted her to enter a confidence-and-supply arrangement with the Democratic Unionist Party (DUP). Following the 2017 election, May's premiership continued to be dominated by Brexit, in particular by her government's negotiations with the EU, adhering to the Chequers plan, which led to a draft Brexit withdrawal agreement. Other events that occurred during May's premiership included terrorist attacks in Westminster, the Manchester Arena and London Bridge, and the Grenfell Tower fire and Windrush scandal. Her government announced the NHS Long Term Plan and was responsible for negotiating and approving the near-entirety of the UK's terms of exit from the EU. May was also a prominent figure in leading the international condemnation and response to Russia over the poisoning of Sergei and Yulia Skripal in March 2018. May survived two votes of no confidence in December 2018 and in January 2019, but after versions of her draft withdrawal agreement were rejected by Parliament three times and her party's poor performance in the 2019 European Parliament election, she left office in July and was succeeded by Boris Johnson, her former foreign secretary.

May remained in the House of Commons as a backbencher until she stood down at the 2024 general election. She was elevated to the House of Lords later that year as Baroness May of Maidenhead.

== Early life and education ==
Theresa May was born Theresa Mary Brasier on 1 October 1956 in Eastbourne, East Sussex. She is the only child of Zaidee Mary (née Barnes) and Hubert Brasier. Her father was a Church of England clergyman (and an Anglo-Catholic) who was chaplain of an Eastbourne hospital. He later became vicar of Enstone with Heythrop and finally of St Mary's at Wheatley, to the east of Oxford. May's mother was a supporter of the Conservative Party. Her father died in 1981, from injuries sustained in a car accident, and her mother of multiple sclerosis the following year. May later stated she was "sorry they [her parents] never saw me elected as a Member of Parliament".

May initially attended Heythrop Primary School, a state school in Heythrop, followed by St. Juliana's Convent School for Girls, a Roman Catholic independent school in Begbroke, which closed in 1984.

At the age of 13, May won a place at the former Holton Park Girls' Grammar School, a state school in Wheatley. During her time as a pupil, the Oxfordshire education system was reorganised, and the school became the new Wheatley Park Comprehensive School. May attended the University of Oxford, read geography at St Hugh's College, and graduated with a second class BA degree in 1977. She was taught political geography at St Hugh's by John Patten, Baron Patten, a future Conservative Secretary of State for Education under John Major. At St Hugh's, May's contemporaries included the barrister Alicia Collinson, wife of May's future deputy Damian Green; businesswoman Louise Patten; and Emma Hood, wife of former Oxford University Vice-Chancellor John Hood.

May worked at a bakery on Saturdays to earn pocket money and was a "tall, fashion-conscious young woman who from an early age spoke of her ambition to be the first woman prime minister," according to those who knew her. A university friend, Pat Frankland, said, "I cannot remember a time when she did not have political ambitions."

== Early career ==
Between 1977 and 1983, May worked at the Bank of England. From 1985 to 1997, she was a financial consultant at the Association for Payment Clearing Services (APACS). She served as Head of the European Affairs Unit from 1989 to 1996 and Senior Adviser on International Affairs from 1996 to 1997 in the organisation.

May served as a councillor for Durnsford ward on the Borough Council of the London Borough of Merton from 1986 to 1994, where she was Chairman of Education (1988–1990) and Deputy Group Leader and Housing Spokesman (1992–1994).

In the 1992 general election May was the Conservative Party candidate for the safe Labour seat of North West Durham, placing second to incumbent MP Hilary Armstrong, with future Liberal Democrat leader Tim Farron placing third. May then stood at the 1994 Barking by-election, which was prompted by the death of Labour MP Jo Richardson. The seat had been continuously held by Labour since it was created in 1945, and Labour candidate Margaret Hodge was expected to win easily, which she did. May placed a distant third.

=== Election ===
Around 18 months ahead of the 1997 general election, May was selected as the Conservative candidate for Maidenhead, a new seat which was created from parts of the safe seats of Windsor and Maidenhead and Wokingham. She was elected comfortably with 25,344 votes (49.8%), almost double the total of second-placed Andrew Terence Ketteringham of the Liberal Democrats, who took 13,363 votes (26.3%). Despite this, her party suffered their worst defeat nationally in over 150 years.

=== Early parliamentary career ===
Having entered Parliament, May became a member of William Hague's front-bench Opposition team, as Shadow Spokesman for Schools, Disabled People and Women (1998–1999). She became the first of the 1997 MPs to enter the Shadow Cabinet when in 1999 she was appointed Shadow Education and Employment Secretary. After the 2001 election the new Conservative leader Iain Duncan Smith kept her in the Shadow Cabinet, moving her to the Transport portfolio.

May was appointed the first female Chairman of the Conservative Party in July 2002. During her speech at the 2002 Conservative Party Conference, she explained why, in her view, her party must change: "You know what people call us? The Nasty Party. In recent years a number of politicians have behaved disgracefully and then compounded their offences by trying to evade responsibility. We all know who they are. Let's face it, some of them have stood on this platform." She accused some unnamed colleagues of trying to "make political capital out of demonising minorities", and charged others with indulging themselves "in petty feuding or sniping instead of getting behind a leader who is doing an enormous amount to change a party which has suffered two landslide defeats". She admitted that constituency selection committees seemed to prefer candidates they would "be happy to have a drink with on a Sunday morning", continuing to say, "At the last general election 38 new Tory MPs were elected. Of that total, only one was a woman and none was from an ethnic minority. Is that fair? Is one half of the population entitled to only one place out of 38?"

In 2003, after Michael Howard's election as Conservative Party and Opposition Leader in November that year, May was appointed Shadow Secretary of State for Transport and the Environment.

In June 2004, she was moved to become Shadow Secretary of State for the Family. Following the 2005 general election she was also made Shadow Secretary of State for Culture, Media and Sport. After David Cameron's election as Conservative Party and Opposition Leader, he appointed May as Shadow Leader of the House of Commons in December 2005 and as Shadow Minister for Women and Equality in July 2007. In January 2009, May was made Shadow Secretary of State for Work and Pensions.

On 6 May 2010, May was re-elected MP for Maidenhead with an increased majority of 16,769 – 60% of the vote. This followed an earlier failed attempt by the Liberal Democrats to unseat her in 2005, as one of that party's leading "decapitation-strategy" targets.

== Home Secretary ==
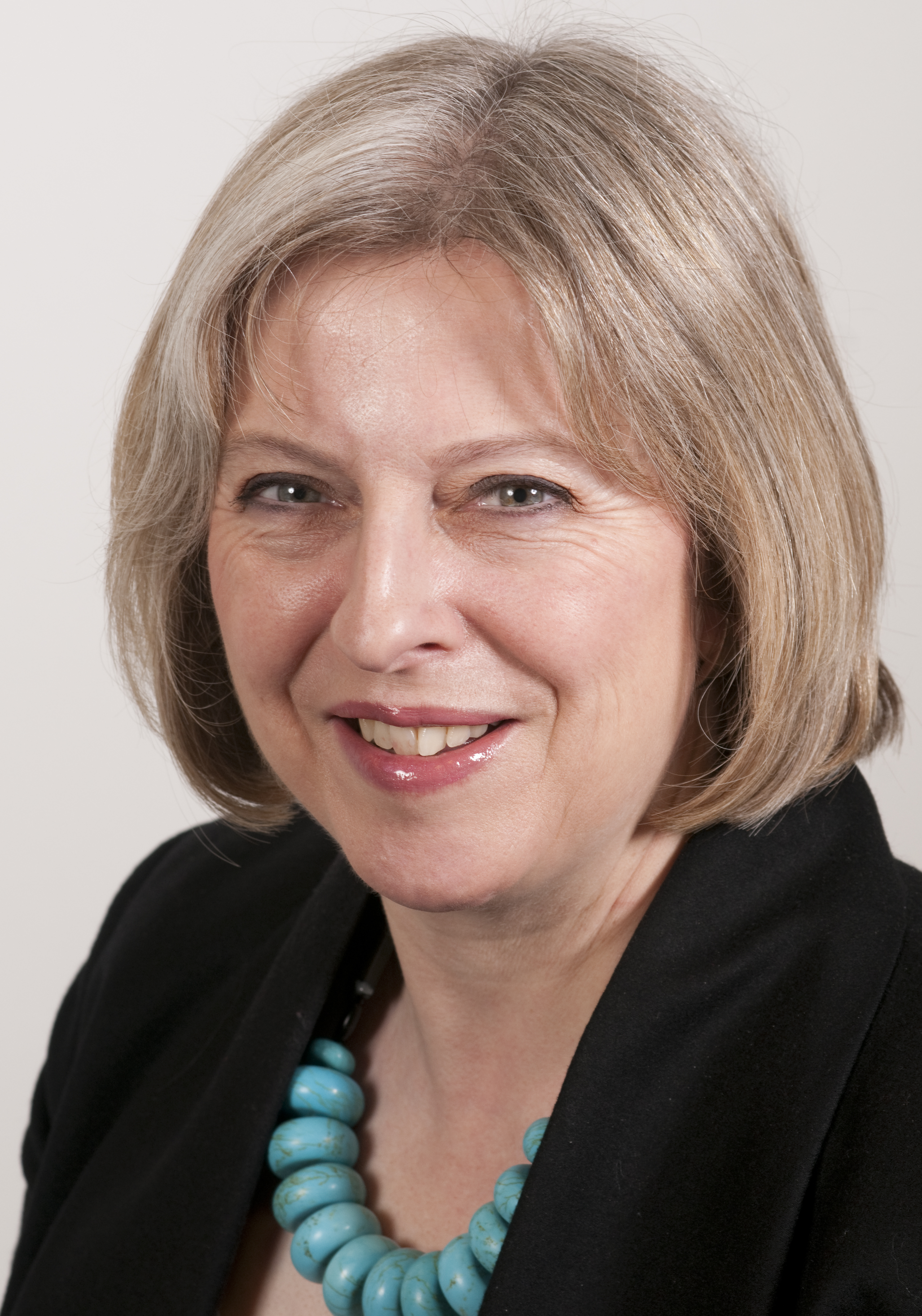
May's portrait as Home Secretary, 2010

Following the formation of the coalition government after the 2010 general election on 12 May 2010, May was appointed Home Secretary and Minister for Women and Equalities by Prime Minister David Cameron as part of his first Cabinet. She became the fourth woman to hold one of the British Great Offices of State, after Margaret Thatcher (Prime Minister), Margaret Beckett (Foreign Secretary) and Jacqui Smith (Home Secretary). As home secretary, May was also a member of the National Security Council. She was the longest-serving Home Secretary for over 60 years, since James Chuter Ede who served over six years and two months from August 1945 to October 1951. May's appointment as Home Secretary was somewhat unexpected, with Chris Grayling having served as shadow Home Secretary in opposition.

May's debut as home secretary involved overturning several of the previous Labour government's measures on data collection and surveillance in England and Wales. By way of a government bill which became the Identity Documents Act 2010, she brought about the abolition of the Labour government's National Identity Card and database scheme and reformed the regulations on the retention of DNA samples for suspects and controls on the use of CCTV cameras. In May 2010, May announced the adjournment of the deportation to the United States of alleged computer hacker Gary McKinnon. She also suspended the registration scheme for carers of children and vulnerable people, with May saying that the measures were "draconian. You were assumed to be guilty until you were proven innocent, and told you were able to work with children." On 4 August 2010, it was reported that May was scrapping the former Labour government's proposed "go orders" scheme to protect women from domestic violence by banning abusers from the victim's home.

In June 2010, May faced her first major national security incident as home secretary with the Cumbria shootings. She delivered her first major speech in the House of Commons as Home Secretary in a statement on this incident, later visiting the victims with the prime minister. Also in June 2010, May banned the Indian Muslim preacher Zakir Naik from entering the United Kingdom.

According to The Daily Telegraph, a Home Office official who disagreed with this decision was suspended. In late June 2010, May announced plans for a temporary cap on UK visas for non-EU migrants. The move raised concerns about the impact on the British economy.

In August 2013, May supported the detention of David Miranda, partner of Guardian journalist Glenn Greenwald, under the Terrorism Act 2000, saying that critics of the Metropolitan Police action needed to "think about what they are condoning". Lib Dem peer and former director of public prosecutions Ken Macdonald accused May of an "ugly and unhelpful" attempt to implicate those who were concerned about the police action of "condoning terrorism". The High Court subsequently acknowledged there were "indirect implications for press freedom" but ruled the detention legal. A 2016 ruling by the Court of Appeal found that the provision of the Terrorism Act used for Miranda's detention was "incompatible with the European convention on human rights", but that the detention itself was lawful.

May also championed legislation popularly dubbed the Snooper's Charter, requiring internet and mobile service providers to keep records of internet usage, voice calls, messages and email for up to a year in case police requested access to the records while investigating a crime. The Liberal Democrats had blocked the first attempt, but after the Conservative Party obtained a majority in the 2015 general election May announced a new Draft Investigatory Powers Bill similar to the Draft Communications Data Bill, although with more limited powers and additional oversight.

=== Police and crime ===
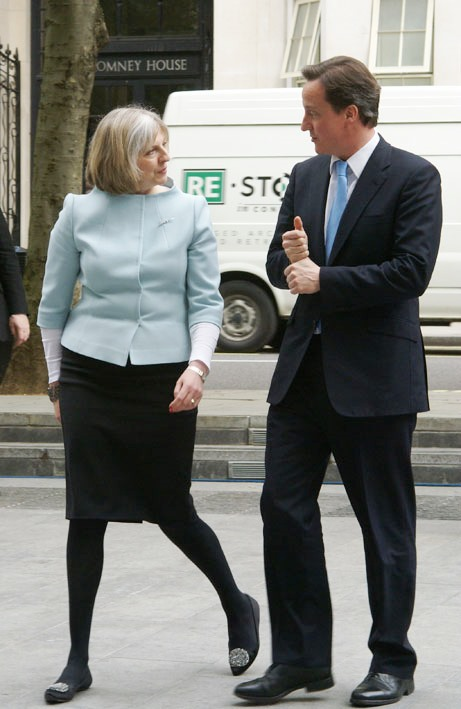
May with her then-leader David Cameron, May 2010

Speaking at the Association of Chief Police Officers (ACPO) conference in June 2010, May announced radical cuts to the Home Office budget, likely to lead to a reduction in police numbers. In July 2010, May presented the House of Commons with proposals for a fundamental review of the previous Labour government's security and counter-terrorism legislation, including "stop and search" powers, and her intention to review the 28-day limit on detaining terrorist suspects without charge.

In July 2010, May announced a package of reforms to policing in England and Wales in the House of Commons. The previous Labour Government's central crime agency, Soca (Serious Organised Crime Agency), was to be replaced by a new National Crime Agency. In common with the Conservative Party 2010 general election manifesto's flagship proposal for a "Big Society" based on voluntary action, May also proposed increasing the role of civilian "reservists" for crime control. The reforms were rejected by the Opposition Labour Party.

Following the actions of some members of Black Bloc in vandalising allegedly tax-avoiding shops and businesses on the day of the March 2011 TUC march, the home secretary unveiled reforms curbing the right to protest, including giving police extra powers to remove masked individuals and to police social networking sites to prevent illegal protest without police consent or notification.

In 2012, despite inquiries by both Scotland Yard and the Independent Police Complaints Commission ruling that there was no new evidence to warrant further investigation, after discussions with Doreen Lawrence, May commissioned Mark Ellison to review Scotland Yard's investigations into alleged police corruption. The report was presented to Parliament by May on 6 March 2014. Sir Bernard Hogan-Howe, Commissioner of the Metropolitan Police said the report, which has prompted an inquiry into undercover policing, was "devastating".

In July 2013, May welcomed the fact that crime had fallen by more than 10% under the coalition government, while still being able to make savings. She said that this was partly due to the government removing red tape and scrapping targets to allow the police to concentrate on crime-fighting.

In 2014, May delivered a speech to the Police Federation, in which she criticised aspects of the culture of the police force. In the speech, she said:

When you remember the list of recent revelations about police misconduct, it is not enough to mouth platitudes about "a few bad apples". The problem might lie with a minority of officers, but it is still a significant problem and a problem that needs to be addressed ... according to one survey carried out recently, only 42% of black people from a Caribbean background trust the police. That is simply not sustainable ... I will soon publish proposals to strengthen the protections available to whistleblowers in the police. I am creating a new criminal offence of police corruption. And I am determined that the use of stop and search must come down, become more targeted and lead to more arrests.

On 9 December 2010, in the wake of violent student demonstrations in central London against increases to higher-education tuition fees, May praised the actions of the police in controlling the demonstrations but was described by The Daily Telegraph as "under growing political pressure" due to her handling of the protests.

In December 2010, May declared that deployment of water cannon by police forces in mainland Britain was an operational decision which had been "resisted until now by senior police officers." She rejected their use following the widespread rioting in summer 2011 and said: "the way we police in Britain is not through use of water cannon. The way we police in Britain is through consent of communities." May said: "I condemn utterly the violence in Tottenham... Such disregard for public safety and property will not be tolerated, and the Metropolitan Police have my full support in restoring order."

In the aftermath of the riots May urged the identification of as many as possible of the young criminals involved. She said: "when I was in Manchester last week, the issue was raised to me about the anonymity of juveniles who are found guilty of crimes of this sort. The Crown Prosecution Service is to order prosecutors to apply for anonymity to be lifted in any youth case they think is in the public interest. The law currently protects the identity of any suspect under the age of 18, even if they are convicted, but it also allows for an application to have such restrictions lifted, if deemed appropriate." May added that "what I've asked for is that CPS guidance should go to prosecutors to say that where possible, they should be asking for the anonymity of juveniles who are found guilty of criminal activity to be lifted".

==== Anti-social behaviour ====
In July 2010, May proposed to review the previous Labour Government's anti-social behaviour legislation signalling the abolition of the "Anti-Social Behaviour Order" (ASBO). She identified the policy's high level of failure with almost half of ASBOs breached between 2000 and 2008, leading to "fast-track" criminal convictions. May proposed a less punitive, community-based approach to tackling social disorder. May suggested that anti-social behaviour policy "must be turned on its head", reversing the ASBO's role as the flagship crime control policy legislation under Labour. Former Labour Home Secretaries David Blunkett (who introduced ASBOs) and Alan Johnson expressed their disapproval of the proposals.

==== Drug policy ====
In July 2013, May decided to ban the stimulant khat, against the advice of the Advisory Council on the Misuse of Drugs (ACMD). The council reached the conclusion that there was "insufficient evidence" it caused health problems. Explaining the change in the classification May said: "The decision to bring khat under control is finely balanced and takes into account the expert scientific advice and these broader concerns", and pointed out that the product had already been banned in the majority of other EU member states, as well as most of the G8 countries including Canada and the US. A report on khat use by the ACMD published in January 2013 had noted the product had been associated with "acute psychotic episodes", "chronic liver disease" and family breakdown. However, it concluded that there is no risk of harm for most users, and recommended that khat remain uncontrolled due to lack of evidence for these associations.

Liberal Democrat minister Norman Baker accused May of suppressing proposals to treat rather than prosecute minor drug offenders from a report into drug policy commissioned by the Home Office. The Home Office denied that its officials had considered this as part of their strategy. Baker cited difficulties in working with May as the reason for his resignation from the Home Office in the run-up to the 2015 general election.

=== Immigration ===
In 2010, May promised to bring the level of net migration down to less than 100,000. The Independent reported in February 2015, "The Office for National Statistics (ONS) announced a net flow of 298,000 migrants to the UK in the 12 months to September 2014—up from 210,000 in the previous year." In total, 624,000 people migrated to the UK in the year ending September 2014 and 327,000 left in the same period. Statistics showed "significant increases in migration among both non-EU citizens—up 49,000 to 292,000—and EU citizens, which rose by 43,000 to 251,000."

In May 2012 she told The Daily Telegraph of her intention "to create here in Britain a really hostile environment for illegal migration".

May rejected the European Union's proposal of compulsory refugee quotas. She said that it was important to help people living in war-zone regions and refugee camps but "not the ones who are strong and rich enough to come to Europe". In May 2016, The Daily Telegraph reported that she had tried to save £4m by rejecting an intelligence project to use aircraft surveillance to detect illegal immigrant boats.

==== Family migration ====
In June 2012, May announced that new restrictions would be introduced to reduce the number of non-European Economic Area family migrants. The changes were mostly intended to apply to new applicants after 9 July 2012.

The newly introduced rules came into effect on 9 July 2012 allowing only those British citizens earning more than £18,600 to bring their spouses or their children to live with them in the UK. This figure would rise significantly in cases where visa applications are also made for children. They also increased the current two-year probationary period for partners to 5 years. The rules also prevent any adult and elderly dependents from settling in the UK unless they can demonstrate that, as a result of age, illness or disability, they require a level of long-term personal care that can only be provided by a relative in the UK.

The House of Lords was concerned about the immigration issue and therefore addressed the PM in Parliament as to whether she had examined the impact on communities and families on modest incomes, but it received no direct response. The human rights group Liberty concluded that the new rules showed scant regard to the impact they would have on genuine families. The All-Party Parliamentary Group on Migration conducted an evidence based inquiry into the impact of the rules and concluded in their report that the rules were causing very young children to be separated from their parents and could exile British citizens from the UK.

==== Deportation decisions ====
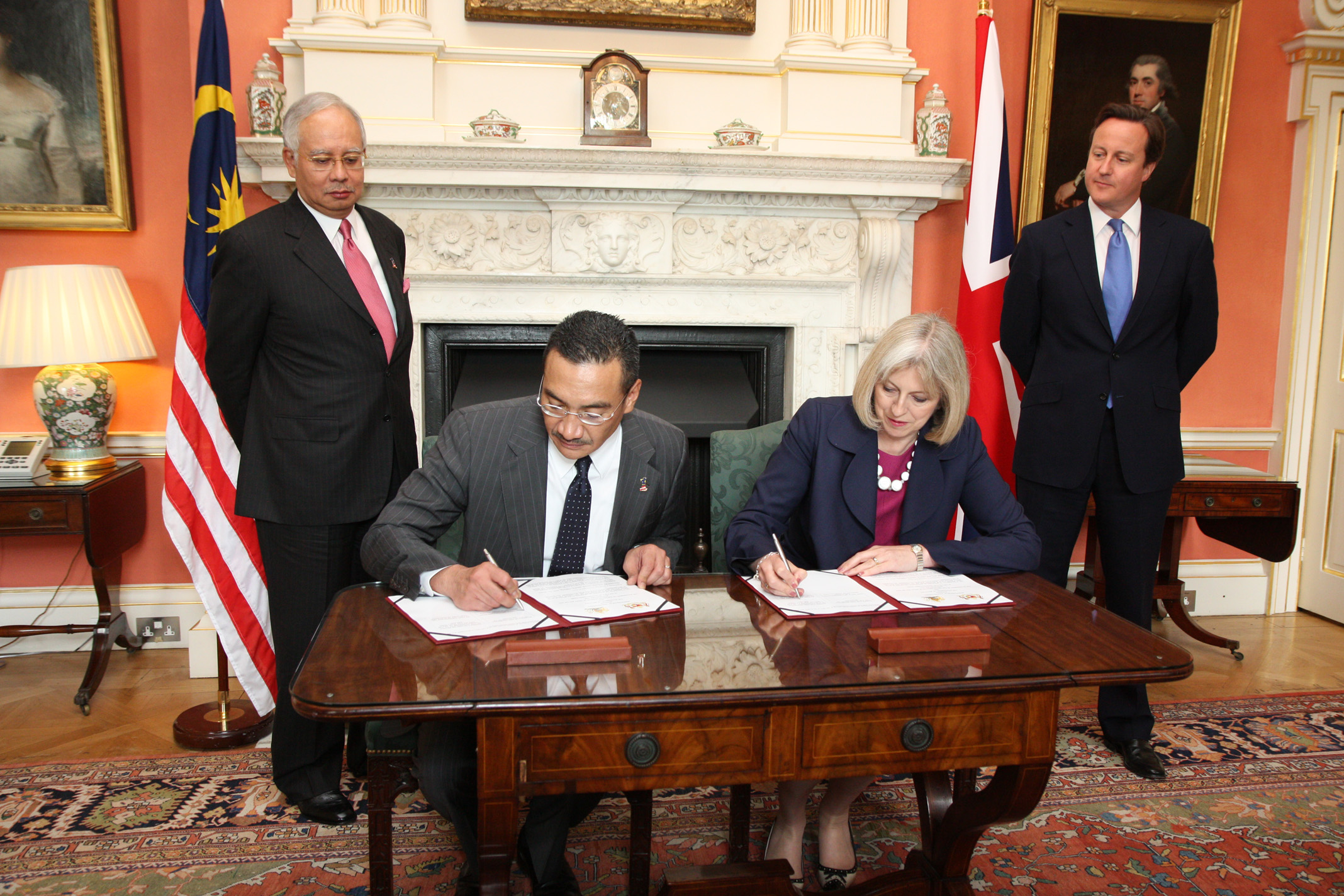
May, David Cameron and Najib Razak, 14 July 2011

At the Conservative Party Conference in October 2011, while arguing that the Human Rights Act needed to be amended, May gave the example of a foreign national who the Courts ruled was allowed to remain in the UK, "because—and I am not making this up—he had a pet cat". In response, the Royal Courts of Justice issued a statement, denying that this was the reason for the tribunal's decision in that case, and stating that the real reason was that he was in a genuine relationship with a British partner, and owning a pet cat was simply one of many pieces of evidence given to show that the relationship was "genuine". The Home Office had failed to apply its own rules for dealing with unmarried partners of people settled in the UK. Amnesty International said May's comments only fuelled "myths and misconceptions" about the Human Rights Act and Justice Secretary Kenneth Clarke subsequently called May's comments "laughable and childlike."

In June 2012, May was found in contempt of court by Judge Barry Cotter, and stood accused of "totally unacceptable and regrettable behaviour", being said to have shown complete disregard for a legal agreement to free an Algerian from a UK Immigration Detention Centre. As she eventually allowed the prisoner to be freed, May avoided further sanctions including fines or imprisonment.

May responded to a Supreme Court decision in November 2013 to overturn her predecessor Jacqui Smith's revocation of Iraqi-born terror suspect Al Jedda's British citizenship by ordering it to be revoked for a second time, making him the first person to be stripped twice of British citizenship.

May was accused by Lord Roberts of Llandudno of being willing to allow someone to die "to score a political point" over the deportation of mentally ill Nigerian man Isa Muazu. According to Muazu's solicitor, May had arranged for the asylum seeker, who was said to be "near death" after a 100-day hunger strike, to be deported by a chartered private jet. To strengthen the Home Office's tough stance, an "end of life" plan was reportedly offered to Muazu, who was one of a number of hunger strikers at the Harmondsworth Immigration Removal Centre.

==== Abu Qatada deportation ====
In July 2013, Abu Qatada, a radical cleric arrested in 2002, was deported to Jordan after a decade-long battle that had cost the nation £1.7 million in legal fees, and several prior Home Secretaries had not resolved. The deportation was the result of a treaty negotiated by May in April 2013, under which Jordan agreed to give Qatada a fair trial, by not using evidence that may have been obtained against him through torture.

May pointed to Qatada's deportation as a triumph, guaranteeing in September 2013 that "he will not be returning to the UK", and declaring in her 2016 leadership campaign announcement that she was told that she "couldn't deport Abu Qatada" but that she "flew to Jordan and negotiated the treaty that got him out of Britain for good". The Qatada deportation also shaped May's views on the European Convention on Human Rights and European Court of Human Rights, saying that they had "moved the goalposts" and had a "crazy interpretation of our human rights laws", as a result, May has since campaigned against the institutions, saying that British withdrawal from them should be considered.

==== "Go Home" advertisements ====
In August 2013, the Home Office engaged in an advertising campaign directed at illegal immigrants. The advertisements, in the form of mobile advertising hoardings on the back of lorries, told illegal immigrants to "go home or face arrest", with an image of a person in handcuffs, and were deployed in six London boroughs with substantial ethnic minority populations. They were widely criticised as creating a hostile atmosphere for members of ethnic minority groups. The shadow Home Secretary, Yvette Cooper, described their language as being reminiscent of that used by the National Front in the 1970s. An adjudication by the Advertising Standards Authority (ASA) said that "the claim [that 106 arrests were made last week] was misleading and had not been substantiated" was followed by the advertisements being withdrawn after being banned by the ASA.

==== Passport backlog ====
In mid 2014, the Passport Office faced a backlog in developing processing passport applications, with around 30,000 applications hit by delays. David Cameron suggested this had come about due to the Passport Office's receiving an "above normal" 300,000-rise in applications. It was revealed, however, that May had been warned the year before, in July 2013, that a surge of 350,000 extra applications could occur owing to the closure of processing overseas under Chancellor Osborne's programme of cuts. Around £674,000 was paid to staff who helped clear the backlog.

==== Windrush scandal ====
In April 2018, May's hostile environment policy became the focus of British politics in what came to be known as the Windrush scandal, in which members of the Windrush generation of Afro-Caribbean Britons were threatened with deportation by the Home Office and in at least 83 cases, illegally deported from the UK. The policy also affected the lives of many thousands of people who were in the United Kingdom legally by causing them to be sacked from employment, preventing access to health care, illegally demanding money, exiling them and preventing their return to the UK, and leaving them destitute. The scandal led to the resignation of May's successor Amber Rudd as home secretary, and her replacement by Sajid Javid. Responding to questions in Parliament on the Windrush scandal on 25 April, May maintained that the hostile environment policy would remain government policy.

=== Birmingham schools row ===
In June 2014, an inflamed public argument arose between Home Office and Education Ministers about responsibility for alleged extremism in Birmingham schools. Prime Minister David Cameron intervened to resolve the row, insisting that May sack her Special Advisor Fiona Cunningham (now Hill) for releasing on May's website a confidential letter to May's colleagues, and that Michael Gove, the Education Secretary, apologise to the Home Office's head of Security and Counter-Terrorism, Charles Farr, for uncomplimentary briefings of him appearing on the front page of The Times.

=== Minister for Women and Equalities ===
May held the office of Minister for Women and Equalities in parallel to her office of Home Secretary from 2010 to September 2012, when this role was taken over by Maria Miller.

May's appointment as Minister for Women and Equalities was controversial, and was met with criticism by many in the LGBT community due to May's record of consistently opposing LGBT rights from 1997 to 2004: she voted against equalising the age of consent in 1998, she spoke in favour of Section 28 in 2001, and she spoke against greater adoption rights for homosexuals in 2002. May later stated, during an appearance on the BBC's Question Time in 2010, that she had "changed her mind" on gay adoption. Writing for PinkNews in June 2010, May detailed proposals for improving LGBT rights including measures to tackle homophobia in sport, advocating British society's need for "cultural change".

In July 2010, May stated she would be supporting the previous Labour Government's Anti-Discrimination Laws enshrined in the Equality Act 2010 despite having previously opposed it. The Equality Act came into effect in England, Wales and Scotland on 1 October 2010. She did however announce that a clause she dubbed "Harman's Law" which would have required public bodies to consider how they can reduce socio-economic inequalities when making decisions about spending and services would be scrapped on the grounds that it was "unworkable".

=== Leadership bid ===
In June 2016, May announced her candidacy for the leadership of the Conservative Party to succeed David Cameron, who resigned following the outcome of the European Union membership referendum in which 52 per cent of voters voted in favour of leaving the EU. May emphasised the need for unity within the party regardless of positions on leaving the EU, saying she could bring "strong leadership" and a "positive vision" for the country's future. Despite having backed a vote to remain in the EU, she insisted that there would be no second referendum, saying: "The campaign was fought... and the public gave their verdict. There must be no attempts to remain inside the EU, no attempts to rejoin it through the back door... Brexit means Brexit". An opinion poll that day found 47 per cent of people choosing May as their preferred candidate to be prime minister.

May's supporters included a number of Cabinet ministers, such as Amber Rudd, Chris Grayling, Justine Greening, Jeremy Hunt, Michael Fallon and Patrick McLoughlin. She received the most votes in the first round of voting on 5 July, receiving support from 165 MPs, with rivals Andrea Leadsom receiving 66 votes and Michael Gove 48. The two candidates with the fewest votes, Liam Fox and Stephen Crabb, immediately announced their support for May. May came in first place in the second ballot on 7 July with an overwhelming majority of 199 MPs, compared with 84 for Leadsom and 46 for Gove, who was eliminated. Afterwards, May stated that she was delighted with her support among MPs, and she progressed to a vote of the Conservative Party membership against Leadsom.

In July, Leadsom announced her withdrawal from the leadership contest hours after May had made her first official campaign speech, saying her lack of support amongst Conservative MPs compared to May would be too great a hindrance to becoming a credible prime minister. As the sole remaining candidate, May was formally declared Leader of the Conservative Party that evening.

== Premiership (2016–2019) ==
=== Appointment ===
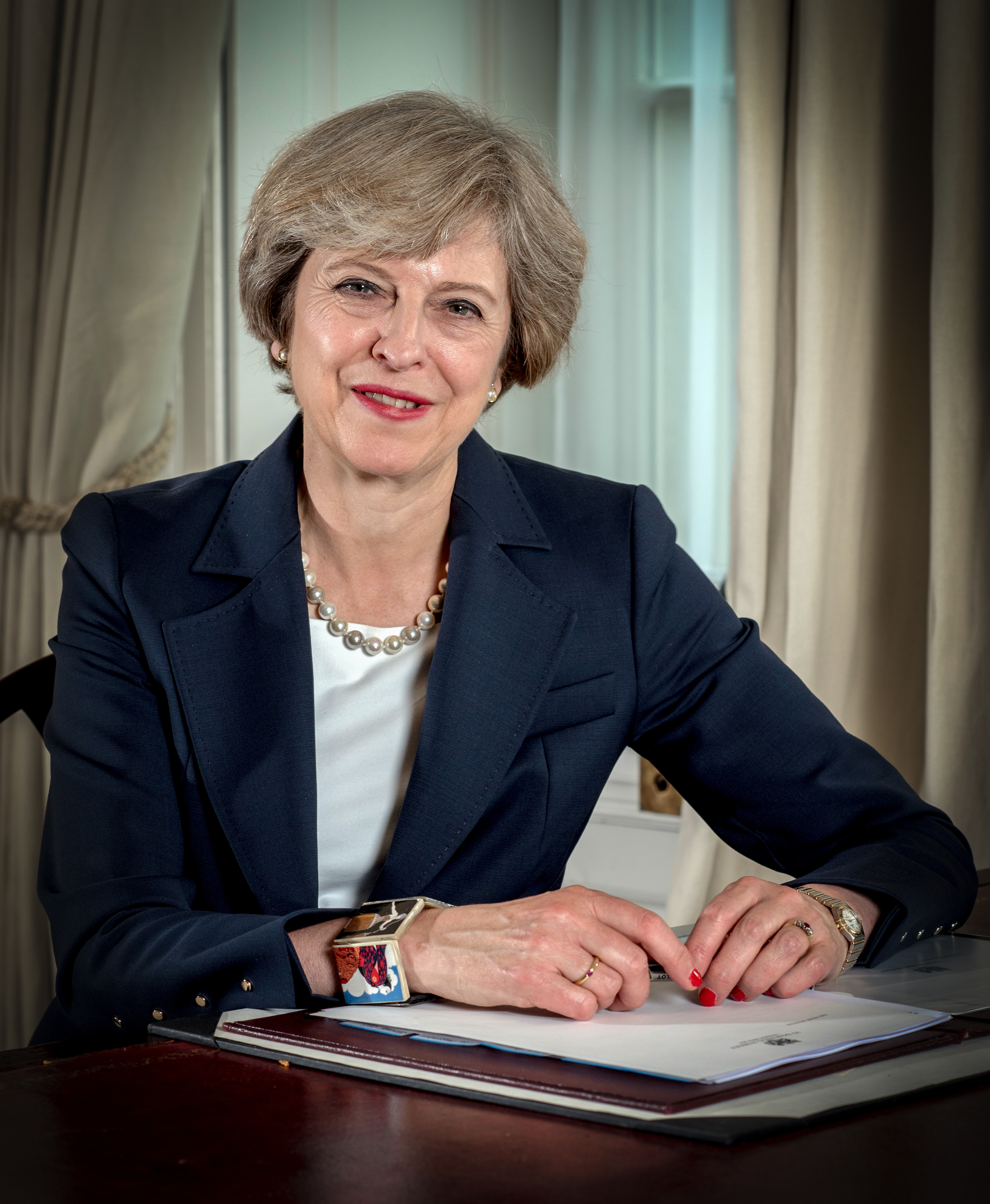
Official portrait, 2016

On 13 July 2016, two days after becoming Leader of the Conservative Party, May was appointed prime minister by Queen Elizabeth II, becoming the second female British prime minister after Margaret Thatcher. Addressing the world's media outside 10 Downing Street, May said that she was "honoured and humbled" to become prime minister. On becoming prime minister, May became the first woman to have held two of the Great Offices of State.

Responding to some calls for an early general election, "sources close to Mrs May" said there was no need for such an election. In a speech after her appointment, May emphasised the term "Unionist" in the name of the Conservative Party, reminding all of "the precious, precious bond between England, Scotland, Wales and Northern Ireland." By 15 July, May had travelled to Edinburgh to meet with First Minister Nicola Sturgeon to reinforce the bond between Scotland and the rest of the United Kingdom. "I'm coming here to show my commitment to preserving this special union that has endured for centuries," she explained.

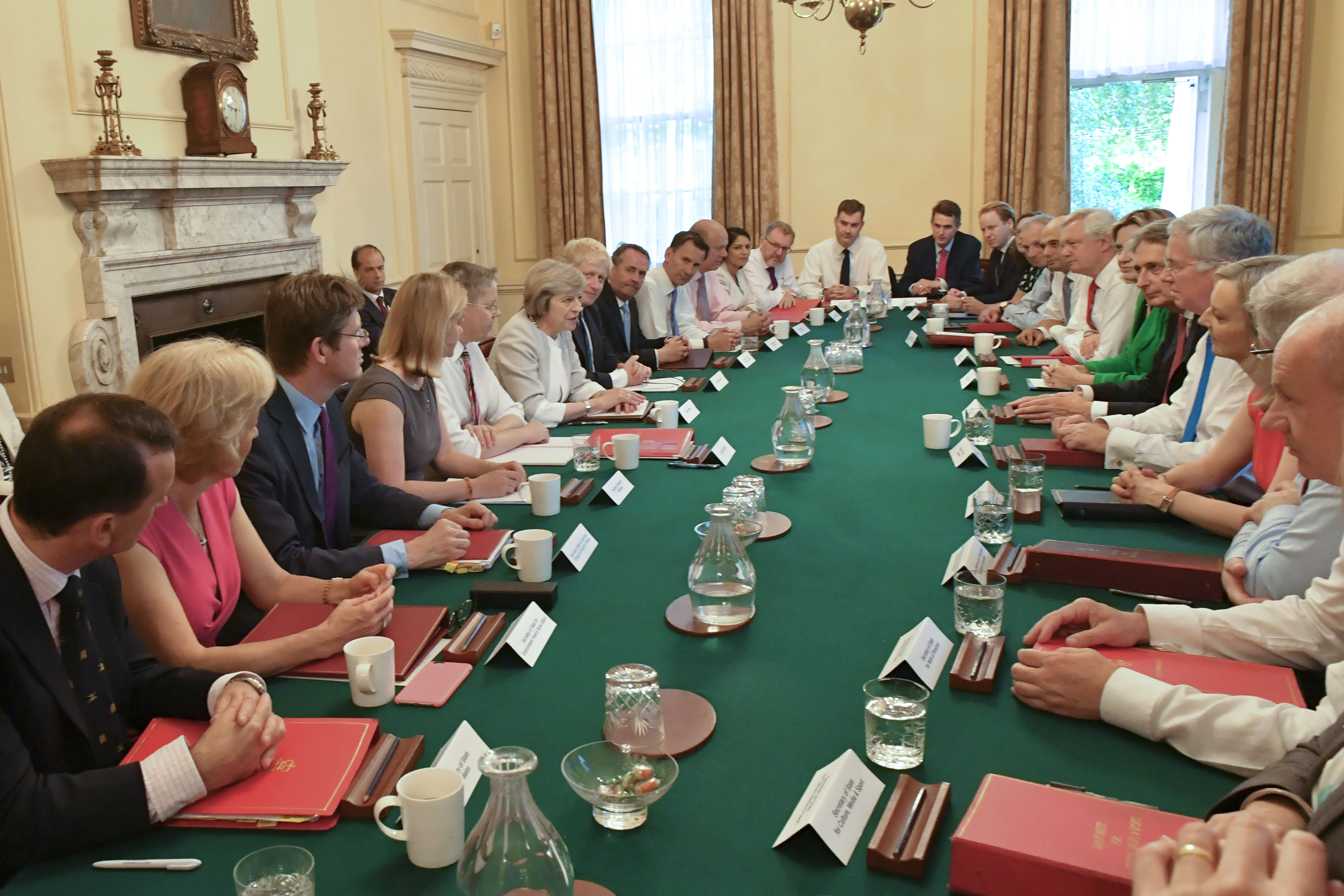
May chairing her first cabinet meeting

=== Cabinet changes ===
May's first Cabinet appointment was described by Reuters as "one of the most sweeping government reshuffles for decades", and called "a brutal cull" by The Daily Telegraph. Nine of Cameron's ministers, including several prominent members, were sacked or resigned from their posts. The early appointments were interpreted both as an effort to reunite the Conservative Party in the wake of the UK's vote to leave the EU and as "a shift to the right," according to The Guardian. ITV's Political Editor Robert Peston commented: "Her rhetoric is more left-wing than Cameron's was, her cabinet is more right-wing than his was." Although May had supported remaining in the EU, she appointed several of the most prominent advocates of Brexit to key Cabinet positions responsible for negotiating the United Kingdom withdrawal from the European Union, including Boris Johnson as Foreign Secretary, David Davis as Brexit Secretary, and Liam Fox as International Trade Secretary, the latter two being new positions. Other key appointees included Amber Rudd as Home Secretary and Philip Hammond as Chancellor of the Exchequer.

=== First term (2016–2017) ===
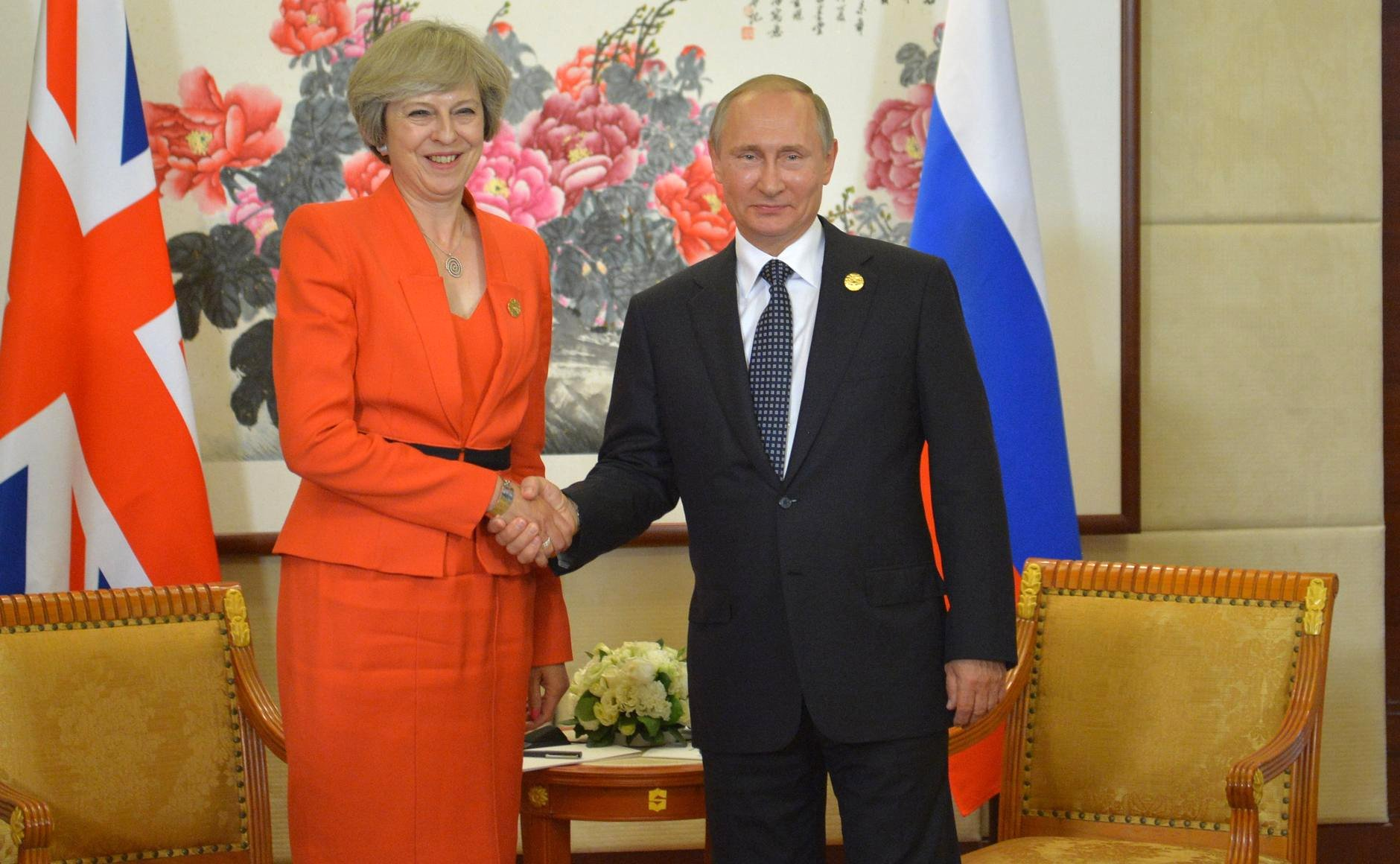
May and Vladimir Putin during the G20 summit in Hangzhou

The First May ministry delayed the final approval for the Hinkley Point C nuclear power station in July 2016, a project which May had objected to when she was home secretary. Her political adviser Nick Timothy wrote an article in 2015 to oppose China's involvement in sensitive sectors. He said that the government was "selling our national security to China" without rational concerns and "the Government seems intent on ignoring the evidence and presumably the advice of the security and intelligence agencies".

In July 2016, when George Kerevan asked her whether she would be prepared to authorise the killing of a hundred thousand innocent persons by a nuclear strike; during the "Trident debate" inside the House of Commons, May said "Yes. And I have to say to the honourable gentleman: the whole point of a deterrent is that our enemies need to know that we would be prepared to use it. Unlike some suggestions that we could have a nuclear deterrent but not actually be willing to use it, which come from the Labour Party frontbench."

On 20 July, May attended her first Prime Minister's Questions since taking office, then afterwards made her first overseas trip as prime minister, visiting Berlin for talks with German chancellor Angela Merkel. During the visit, May said that she would not trigger Article 50 of the Treaty of Lisbon—the process for withdrawing from the European Union—before 2017, suggesting it would take time for the UK to negotiate a "sensible and orderly departure" from the EU. However, although Merkel said it was right for the UK to "take a moment" before beginning the process, she urged May to provide more clarity on a timetable for negotiations. Shortly before travelling to Berlin, May had also announced that in the wake of the referendum, Britain would relinquish the presidency of the Council of the European Union, which passes between member states every six months on a rotation basis, and that the UK had been scheduled to hold in the second half of 2017.

May supported the Saudi Arabian-led intervention in Yemen and defended selling arms to Saudi Arabia, which is accused of committing war crimes in Yemen, insisting that Britain's close relationship with Saudi Arabia was "helping keep people on the streets of Britain safe".

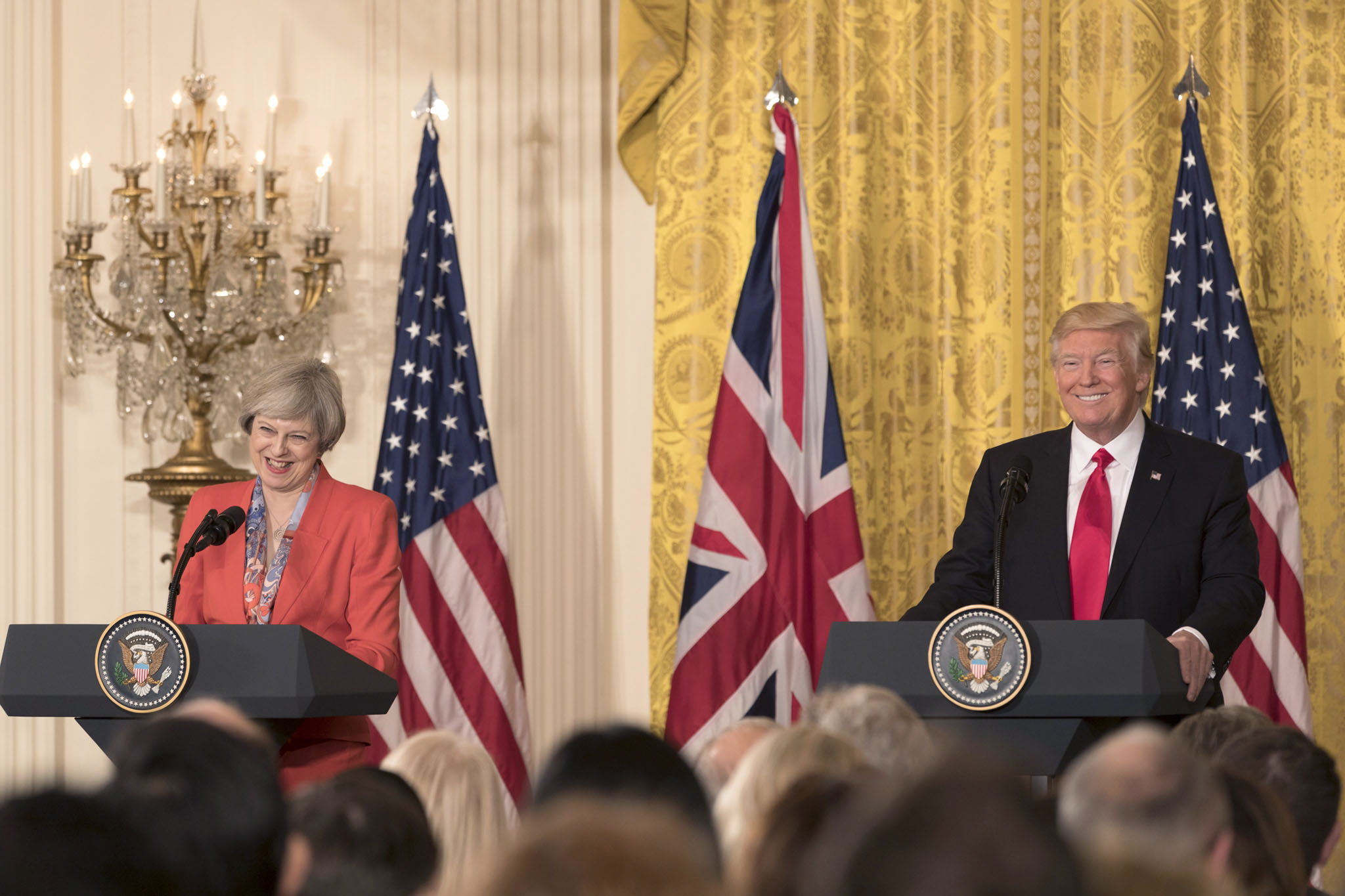
May and Donald Trump in Washington, D.C., January 2017

On 21 January 2017, following the inauguration of Donald Trump as US president, the White House announced that May would meet the president on 27 January, making her the first foreign leader to meet Trump since he took office on 20 January. In a joint press conference, May indicated an interest in increased trade between the United States and the United Kingdom. She also affirmed a desire to maintain an American involvement in NATO. May was criticised by members of major parties, including her own, for refusing to condemn Trump's Executive Order 13769, as well as for inviting Trump to a state visit with Queen Elizabeth II. May attended a Republican Party meeting in Philadelphia and praised the 'special relationship' with the US.After meeting with President Donald Trump in Washington D.C. The Guardian asked May to defund Britain against Trump's dangerous despotism.

In January 2017, when it came to light that a Trident test had malfunctioned in June 2016, May refused to confirm whether she knew about the incident when she addressed parliament.

May's chancellor, Philip Hammond, continued government policies of freezing benefits in his 2017 budget.

=== 2017 general election ===
In May announced that she would call a parliamentary vote to hold an early general election on 8 June, saying that it was the "only way to guarantee certainty and security for years ahead". May had previously ruled out an early election on five occasions over nine months. The election was the first snap election held under the Fixed-term Parliaments Act 2011 after MPs gave May the two-thirds super-majority required.

Unveiling the Conservative manifesto in Halifax on 18 May, May promised a "mainstream government that would deliver for mainstream Britain". It proposed to balance the budget by 2025, raise spending on the NHS by £8bn per annum and on schools by £4bn per annum by 2022, remove the ban on new grammar schools, means-test the winter fuel allowance, replace the state pension "triple lock" with a "double lock" and require executive pay to be approved by a vote of shareholders. It also contained May's previously announced flagship energy reform of a cap on gas and electricity bills for households on standard variable tariffs. It dropped the 2015 pledge to not raise income tax or national insurance contributions but maintained a commitment to freeze VAT. New sovereign wealth funds for infrastructure, rules to prevent foreign takeovers of "critical national infrastructure" and institutes of technology were also proposed. The manifesto was noted for its intervention in industry, lack of tax cuts and increased spending commitments on public services. On Brexit it committed to leaving the single market and customs union while seeking a "deep and special partnership" and promised a vote in parliament on the final agreement.

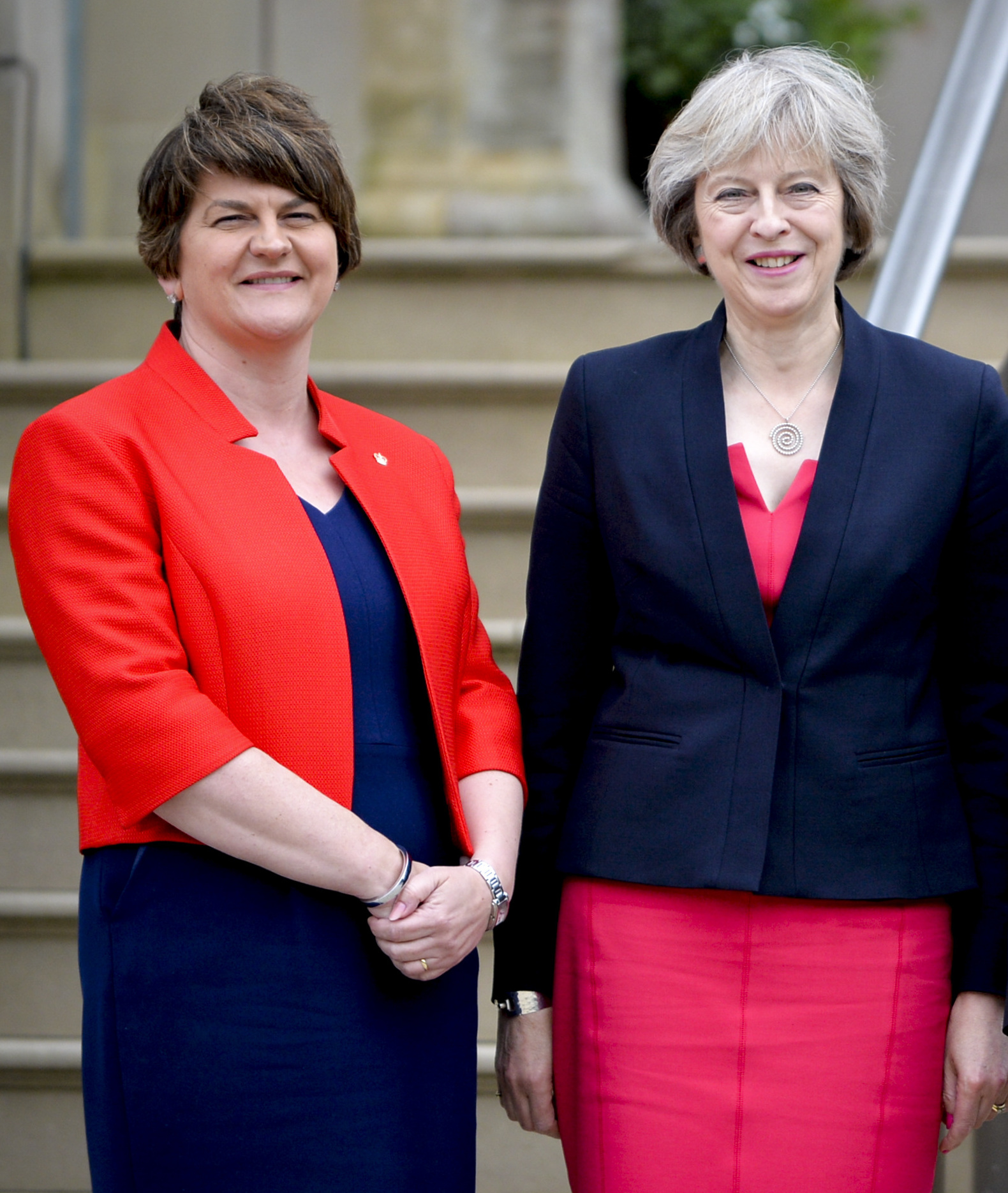
May with Democratic Unionist Party (DUP) leader Arlene Foster

The manifesto also proposed reforms to social care in England that would raise the threshold for free care from £23,250 to £100,000 while including property in the means test and permitting deferred payment after death. After attracting substantial media attention, four days after the manifesto launch May stated that the proposed social care reforms would now include an "absolute limit" on costs in contrast to the rejection of a cap in the manifesto. She criticised the "fake" portrayal of the policy in recent days by Labour and other critics who had termed it a "dementia tax". Evening Standard editor George Osborne called the policy change a "U-turn". The Financial Times contrasted her "Strong and Stable" leadership slogan with her own record of nine rapid U-turns claiming she was "making a habit of retreating from policies."

The general election in June resulted in a hung parliament, prompting her to broker a deal with Northern Ireland's Democratic Unionist Party (DUP), involving £1 billion of additional public funding for Northern Ireland.

=== Second term (2017–2019) ===
Less than two weeks after the 2017 State Opening of Parliament, May ordered a full public inquiry into the contaminated blood scandal. For this she was widely praised as successive governments going back to the 1980s had refused such an inquiry, some though speculated that May had simply been forced to announce the inquiry after a group legal action and news of fresh evidence were brought by Jason Evans. Additionally, Andy Burnham had threatened to take evidence to the police if an inquiry were not announced. With over 1,000 core participants, the Infected Blood Inquiry is the biggest public inquiry ever held in the UK.

==== Myanmar ====
May is the first British prime minister to visit Buenos Aires after the Falklands War. In November 2017, May said the actions of Myanmar Army and police against the Rohingya Muslim minority in Myanmar "looks like ethnic cleansing". According to May, "it is something for which the Burmese authorities – and especially the military – must take full responsibility." From the 2017 general election to December 2017, May suffered no defeats in whipped votes in the House of Commons. On 13 December 2017, May lost a vote on the EU Withdrawal Bill by 309 votes to 305, due to 11 Conservatives voting against the government, including Stephen Hammond who was then vice-chairman of the Conservative Party.

==== Russia ====
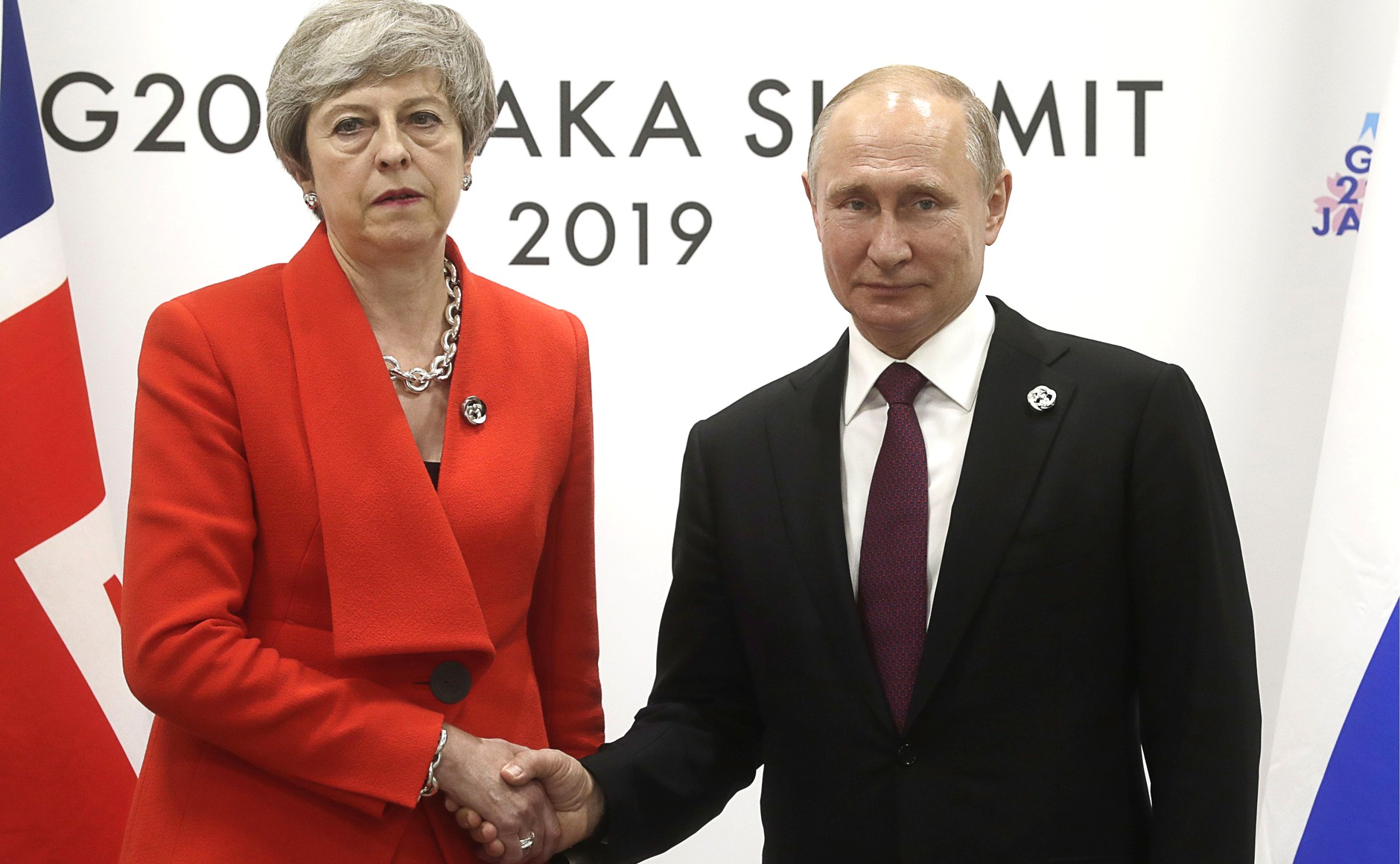
May with Putin in Osaka, 2019

May accused Russia of "threatening the international order", "seeking to weaponise information" and "deploying its state-run media organisations to plant fake stories". She further suggested the country had been meddling in the 2017 German federal election in contradiction of German government officials and security experts, who had dismissed the possibility.

May's government accused Russia for orchestrating the poisoning of Sergei and Yulia Skripal. The UK's official assessment of this incident was supported by 28 other countries, who expelled an unprecedented total of 153 Russian diplomats. May said in the House of Commons on 12 March:

It is now clear that Mr Skripal and his daughter were poisoned with a military-grade nerve agent of a type developed by Russia. This is part of a group of nerve agents known as 'Novichok'. Based on the positive identification of this chemical agent by world-leading experts at the Defence Science and Technology Laboratory at Porton Down; our knowledge that Russia has previously produced this agent and would still be capable of doing so; Russia's record of conducting state-sponsored assassinations; and our assessment that Russia views some defectors as legitimate targets for assassinations; the Government has concluded that it is highly likely that Russia was responsible for the act against Sergei and Yulia Skripal. Mr Speaker, there are therefore only two plausible explanations for what happened in Salisbury on 4 March. Either this was a direct act by the Russian State against our country. Or the Russian government lost control of this potentially catastrophically damaging nerve agent and allowed it to get into the hands of others.

==== China ====
May promised to confront China on human rights but was praised in Communist Party-controlled media for "sidestepping" human rights in China during her first official visit to the country. The Global Times said: "For the Prime Minister, the losses outweigh the gains if she appeases the British media at the cost of the visit's friendly atmosphere."

==== Assassination plot ====
In 2017, Islamic State terrorist Naa'imur Zakariyah Rahman was foiled in a plot to assassinate May at Downing Street.

==== Turkey ====
In May 2018, during a three-day state visit to the UK by Turkish president Recep Tayyip Erdoğan, May declared that Britain is a "true friend" of Turkey, but she added that "It is important that in defence of democracy, which has been facing extraordinary pressures from the failed coup, instability across the border from Syria and from Kurdish terrorism, Turkey does not lose sight of the values it is seeking to defend."

==== Contempt of Parliament ====
On 4 December 2018, on a motion passed by MPs by 311 to 293 votes, the May Government was found in contempt of Parliament; the first government to be found in contempt in history. The vote was triggered by the government failing to lay before Parliament any legal advice on the proposed withdrawal agreement on the terms of the UK's departure from the European Union, after a humble address for a return was unanimously agreed to by the House of Commons on 13 November 2018. The government then agreed to publish the full legal advice for Brexit that was given to the Prime Minister by the Attorney General during negotiations with the European Union.

==== Vote of confidence (Conservative Party) ====
In December 2018, May faced a vote of confidence in her leadership of the Conservative Party over opposition to her negotiated Brexit deal, after the number of Conservative MPs exceeded the 48 no-confidence letter threshold that the 1922 Committee Chairman, Sir Graham Brady required for the vote of confidence to be held. May won the vote with 200 Conservative MPs voting for her, compared to 117 voting against. As part of her speech to the Parliamentary Conservative Party before the confidence vote was opened, it was reported that May conceded that she would step down as prime minister after delivering Brexit and would not lead the Conservative Party into the next general election in exchange for Conservative MPs voting to have confidence in her leadership so that she would be able to keep the party, Parliament and the UK stable during the final stages of Brexit. May later confirmed this to BBC News political editor, Laura Kuenssberg after meeting EU leaders, including Jean-Claude Juncker in Brussels.

==== Vote of no confidence (House of Commons) ====
On 17 December 2018 in the House of Commons, the Leader of the Opposition and Labour Party Leader, Jeremy Corbyn, tabled a motion of no confidence in May's premiership, citing May's refusal to set the date for the meaningful vote on her Brexit deal before Christmas, and instead pushing it back to mid-January. The following day the government refused to allow time for the motion to be debated. John Bercow, Speaker of the House of Commons, confirmed that they were under no obligation to do so. Following the defeat of May's Brexit deal on 15 January 2019, Corbyn tabled a motion of no confidence in the Government, to be voted on by parliament the following evening. The motion was defeated by 325 votes to 306; a majority of 19.

==== Brexit deal defeats ====
In January 2019, May's government was defeated in the House of Commons by a margin of 230 votes (202 in favour and 432 opposed) in a vote on her deal to leave the European Union ("first meaningful vote"). It was the largest majority against a United Kingdom government in history.

In March, May was again defeated in the Commons by 149 votes (242 in favour and 391 against) on her latest deal after she secured last-minute concessions from the EU ("second meaningful vote"). May was then again defeated by 58 votes in the Commons (286 in favour and 344 against) on the withdrawal deal but not the political declaration ("third meaningful vote").

==== Resignation ====
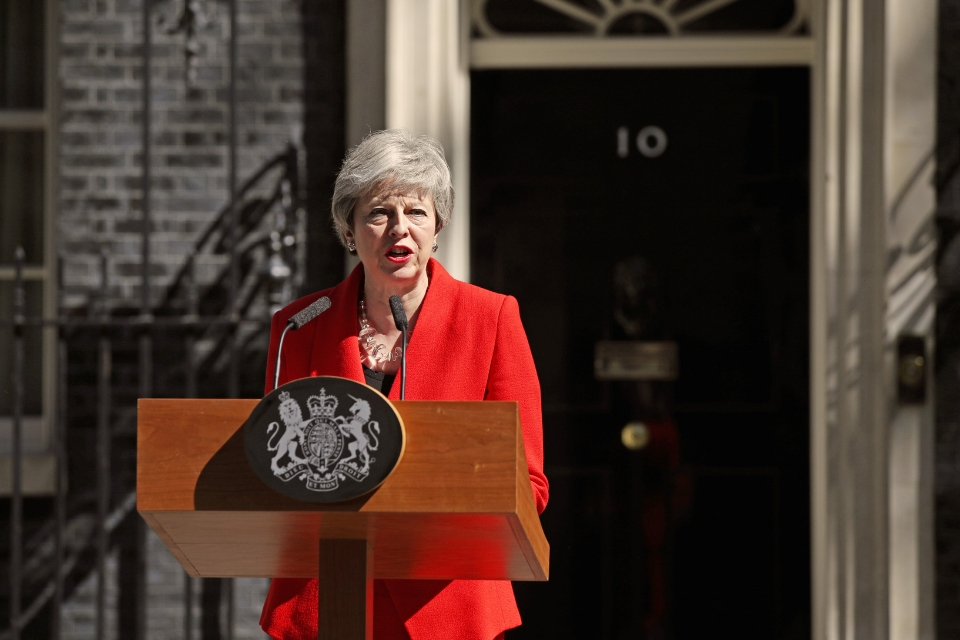
May announces her resignation outside 10 Downing Street on 24 May 2019

I will shortly leave the job that it has been the honour of my life to hold – the second female Prime Minister but certainly not the last. I do so with no ill-will, but with enormous and enduring gratitude to have had the opportunity to serve the country I love.

— Theresa May's resignation statement, 24 May 2019

On 27 March 2019 at a meeting of the 1922 Committee, May confirmed that she would "not lead the UK in the next stage of Brexit negotiations", meaning she was expected to resign after the third meaningful vote, if it had passed successfully. However, no date was stated, and her reported wording was ambiguous and thus carried no binding force. On 29 March, the third meaningful vote was defeated, and while May did not state anything in regards to standing down, Corbyn stated that if May could not find an alternative to her deal "she must go, not at an indeterminate date in the future but now."

On 22 April it was announced that the leaders of 70 Conservative Associations had signed a petition calling for a vote of no confidence. Under party rules an Extraordinary General Meeting must be convened if one is demanded by 65 associations. The non-binding vote, to be determined by 800 of the party's senior officials, would have been the first time such an instance had occurred. On 24 April, the party's 1922 Committee ruled out changing the leadership challenge rules, but its chair, Graham Brady, asked for clarity on when May would step down from office.

On 24 May she confirmed that she would resign as Conservative Party leader on 7 June, stating, "it is now clear to me that it is in the best interests of the country for a new prime minister to lead that effort." She continued to serve as prime minister until she tendered her resignation to the Queen on 24 July. This coincided with the arrival of Boris Johnson as prime minister, who was elected by the Conservative Party membership. By constitutional convention May did not step down until she assured the Queen that Johnson would be able to command the confidence of the House of Commons.

On 24 July 2019, May ended her continuous service at the frontbench since 1998 when she had been appointed Shadow Spokesman for Schools, Disabled People and Women. Mick Davis, who was the chairman of the British Conservative Party when it selected her as leader, exited that post along with May.

=== Ministerial resignations ===
May's premiership had 51 resignations with 33 relating to Brexit. These included 12 departures from the Cabinet. The pace and number of resignations have been described as 'unprecedented' by the Institute for Government, with resignations impacting the functioning of the government. In less than three years, May received more resignations than Thatcher (11 years) or Blair (10 years). The Chief Whip Julian Smith described May's Cabinet as exhibiting the 'worst cabinet ill-discipline in history'.

=== Public opinion ===
May had a high approval rating during her first week as prime minister. The results of an Ipsos MORI survey released in July 2016 indicated that 55% of those surveyed believed that May was a suitable PM while only 23% believed that the Labour Leader Jeremy Corbyn would make a good prime minister.

A ComRes poll taken in September 2016 after her election suggested May was seen as substantially more "in touch with ordinary British people" than her predecessor David Cameron and a majority of voters saw her as "the right person to unite the country".

At the beginning of 2017, nearly six months after becoming prime minister, a ComRes found May was the most popular UK politician with a net rating of +9 which was described as the longest honeymoon period enjoyed by any sitting Conservative prime minister since the end of the Second World War.

The Conservative Party had a 21-point lead over Labour in a poll released the day before May announced a snap election but this lead narrowed substantially. In mid-June, following the election, a YouGov poll showed that May's popularity had dropped to a rating of −34. In April 2018, May had a higher approval rating than Corbyn for the first time since the general election, leading him by −13 to −23.

Plans to reform social care came to dominate the Conservative election campaign during the 2017 snap election, with some arguing it ultimately cost May her majority. May's promised green paper on the future of adult social care was plagued by frequent delays, ultimately never materialising during her premiership. A December 2019 poll by learning disabilities charity Hft found that 59% of social care providers in England believed that the situation in social care worsened under May's premiership, compared to just 3% who said it was slightly better.

== Political positions ==
May has identified herself with the one-nation conservative position within her party.

Since coming into prominence as a front-bench politician, May's public image has divided media opinion, especially from some in the traditionalist right-wing press. Commenting on May's debut as home secretary, Anne Perkins of The Guardian observed that "she'll be nobody's stooge", while Cristina Odone of The Daily Telegraph predicted her to be "the rising star" of the Coalition Government. Allegra Stratton, then with The Guardian, praised May as showing managerial acumen.

Describing her as a liberal Conservative, the Financial Times characterised May as a "non-ideological politician with a ruthless streak who gets on with the job", in doing so comparing her to German chancellor Angela Merkel. Conversely, in The Independent, Rebecca Glover of the Policy Innovation Research Unit contrasted May to Boris Johnson, claiming that she was "staunchly more conservative, more anti-immigration, and more isolationist" than he was.

During her leadership campaign, May said that "We need an economy that works for everyone", pledging to crack down on executive pay by making shareholders' votes binding rather than advisory and to put workers onto company boards (although she later claimed that the last pledge was not to be mandatory), policies that The Guardian describes as going further than the Labour Party's 2015 general election manifesto.

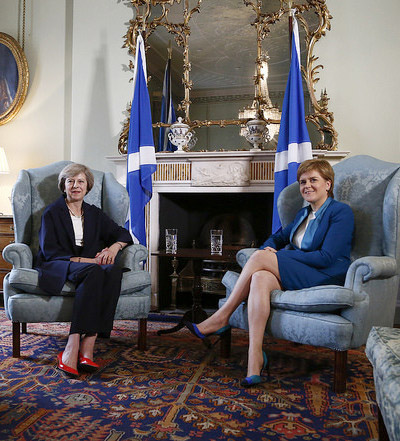
May's first visit since becoming prime minister with First Minister of Scotland, Nicola Sturgeon, at Bute House, Edinburgh

After she became prime minister, May's first speech espoused the left, with a promise to combat the "burning injustice" in British society and to create a union "between all of our citizens" and promising to be an advocate for the "ordinary working-class family" and not for the affluent in the UK. "The government I lead will be driven not by the interests of the privileged few but by yours. We will do everything we can to give you more control over your lives ... When we take the big calls, we'll think not of the powerful, but you. When we pass new laws we'll listen not to the mighty, but to you. When it comes to taxes we'll prioritise not the wealthy but you."

May has described herself as a personal supporter of fox hunting with hounds, saying that foxes' numbers had to be controlled and that hunting them with dogs was the most humane way to do it. The Conservative manifesto for the 2017 election included a pledge to hold a parliamentary vote to repeal the Hunting Act 2004, which prohibits a range of hunting activities.

After the Conservatives' manifesto for the 2017 election was released, some people, including Fraser Nelson of The Spectator, called her a "red Tory", saying that she had moved her party to the left in politics. Politico called her policies "Mayism", saying that Mayism was "a working-class conservatism openly critical of the "cult of individualism" and globalization".

May praised the former prime minister Winston Churchill and has a portrait of Churchill on the wall of her study. May's spokesman said: "The prime minister has quoted and referenced Sir Winston Churchill on many occasion and acknowledged him as one of the great prime ministers of the 20th century."

May welcomed the arrest of WikiLeaks founder Julian Assange, saying that "no one is above the law." Assange had fled to the Ecuadorian embassy in London in 2012 after being accused of sexual assault in Sweden. He is also wanted by the US for "conspiracy to commit computer intrusion" relating to the Wikileaks release of classified material in 2010, including footage of US soldiers killing civilians in Iraq.

=== Foreign policy ===
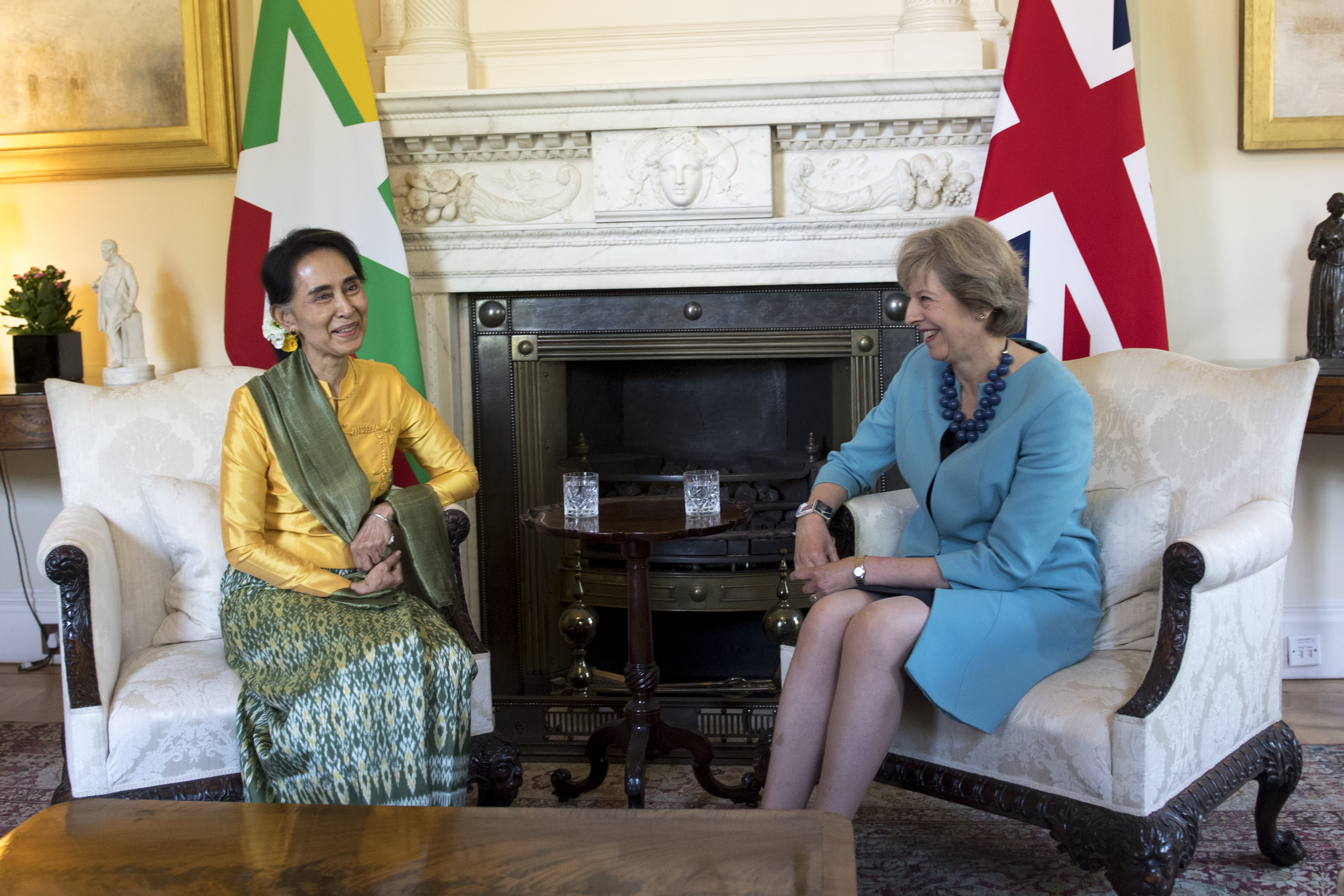
May meeting with State Counsellor of Myanmar and Nobel Peace Prize laureate Aung San Suu Kyi in September 2016

In 2003, May voted to approve the invasion of Iraq and in 2013 voted in favour of British military intervention in the Syrian civil war.

The May Ministry delayed the final approval for the Hinkley Point C nuclear power station in July 2016, a project which May had objected to when she was home secretary. Her political adviser Nick Timothy wrote an article in 2015 to oppose People's Republic of China's involvement in sensitive sectors. He said that the government was "selling our national security to China" without rational concerns and "the Government seems intent on ignoring the evidence and presumably the advice of the security and intelligence agencies."

Politicians and human rights activists urged Theresa May's government to vote against Saudi Arabian retention of the membership of the UN Human Rights Council. Amnesty International's UK Foreign Policy Programme Director Polly Truscott said: "Rather than turning a blind eye to Saudi Arabia's continuing bully tactics, the UK should publicly hold the Saudi authorities to account for its appalling human rights record and the ongoing war crimes in Yemen and should stop selling weapons to Saudi as a matter of urgency." May defended selling arms to Saudi Arabia stating that close ties with the country "keep people on the streets of Britain safe".

=== Economic policy ===
Prior to her premiership, May outlined plans to backtrack on the longstanding government plan to achieve a surplus by 2020, following the UK's withdrawal from the European Union. With uncertainty surrounding the economic outlook, Chancellor of the Exchequer Philip Hammond has suggested that the government's Autumn Statement may be used to "reset" economic policy.

In 2015, while May was home secretary, an 18% funding cut in the police force had taken place with the loss of around 20,000 police officers. Before the Manchester Arena bombing and after the Paris attacks, she was warned by a Manchester senior police officer that the cuts in the force and community policing risked terror attacks in the city due to the lack of resources to undertake proper intelligence and anti-terrorist measures.

In May and Hammond's 2017 budget, continued government policies were confirmed regarding freezing benefits.

May's government published a Green Paper in November 2016 which considered forcing companies to reveal the difference between what their CEOs are paid and what their ordinary workers are paid. On 1 January 2019 new regulations came into force for UK listed companies with over 250 employees to annually disclose the ratio of their CEO's pay to the median, lower quartile, and upper quartile pay of their UK employees.

=== Workers' representatives ===
Before her premiership began, May said that she planned to have workers represented on company boards, saying "If I'm prime minister ... we're going to have not just consumers represented on company boards, but workers as well." May aimed to put workers' and consumers' representatives on boards to make them more accountable. Nils Pratley, a journalist at The Guardian, wrote in July "Fundamental principles of Britain's boardroom governance are being rethought. It is a very welcome development. In the more enlightened quarters of the UK corporate world, they can see that boardroom pay has eroded trust in business." Workers' representatives, it appeared, would have made UK companies more like those in Germany and France. May was accused of backtracking in November 2016 when she said that firms would not be forced to adopt the proposal, saying "there are a number of ways in which that can be achieved".

=== Environmental policy ===
Following the impact of Blue Planet II in 2017, the May administration outlined plans to approve further green policy. A particular focus has been on plastic and its impact on the environment. Her government's "25 Year Environment Plan" was published in January 2018: targets were set for achievement of a number of environmental benefits with dates ranging from 2025 to 2060. In March 2018, May announced plans for a plastic deposit scheme modelled on a similar policy in Norway to boost recycling.

=== EU and Brexit ===
May publicly stated her support for the UK remaining in the EU during the 2016 referendum campaign, but did not campaign extensively in the referendum and criticised aspects of the EU in a speech. It was speculated by political journalists that May had sought to minimise her involvement in the debate to strengthen her position as a future candidate for the Conservative party leadership. Some in David Cameron's ministry likened May to a "submarine" on the issue of Brexit due to her perceived indifference towards the referendum and the EU.

In a leaked recording prior to the Brexit referendum, May stated:

I think the economic arguments are clear. I think being part of a 500-million trading bloc is significant for us. I think, as I was saying to you a little earlier, that one of the issues is that a lot of people will invest here in the UK because it is the UK in Europe. If we were not in Europe, I think there would be firms and companies who would be looking to say, do they need to develop a mainland Europe presence rather than a UK presence? So I think there are definite benefits for us in economic terms.

May also said Britain was more secure as part of the EU due to the European arrest warrant and Europe-wide information sharing among other factors. She said, "There are definitely things we can do as members of the European Union that I think keep us more safe".

May's public reticence during the referendum campaign resulted in tensions with David Cameron and his pro-EU team. Following the referendum and her election as party leader, May signalled that she would support full withdrawal from the EU and prioritise immigration controls over remaining within the single market, leading some to contrast this with her earlier remarks on the earlier economic arguments. She later went on to say before the 2017 United Kingdom general election that she would be willing to leave the EU without a deal, saying that "no deal is better than a bad deal. We have to be prepared to walk out". The Lib Dem leader, Tim Farron, said it was "disappointing that Theresa May lacked the political courage to warn the public as she did a bunch of bankers in private about the devastating economic effects of Brexit. More disappointing is that now she is supposedly in charge, she is blithely ignoring her own warnings and is prepared to inflict an act of monumental self-harm on the UK economy by pulling Britain out of the single market." Phil Wilson for the Open Britain group said, "It's good to know that privately Theresa May thinks what many of us have been saying publicly for a long time, leaving the single market would be bad for businesses and for our economy. Now she is prime minister, Theresa May is in an unrivalled position to act on her previous concerns, starting by putting membership of the single market at the heart of her government's negotiating position."

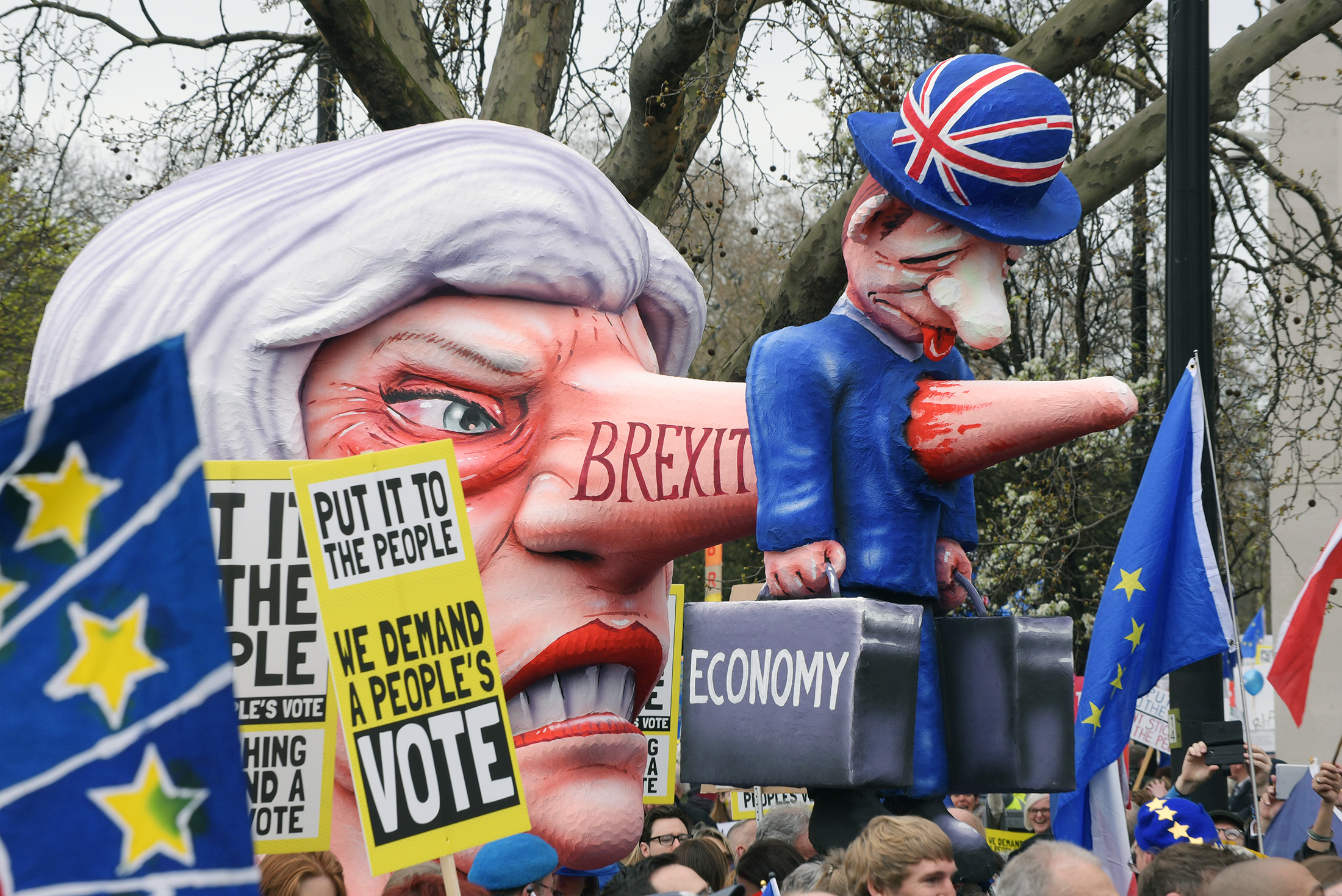
Parade float created by Jacques Tilly at a 2019 protest against leaving the EU

On 22 September 2017, May officially made public the details of her Brexit proposal during a speech in Florence, urging the European Union to maintain a transitional period of two years after Brexit during which trade terms remain unaltered. During this period, the UK would also continue to honour its budget commitments of about €10 billion per annum, and accept immigration from Europe. Her speech was criticised by leading Eurosceptic Nigel Farage. The European Union's Brexit negotiator Michel Barnier welcomed May's proposal as "constructive," but said it also "must be translated into negotiating positions to make meaningful progress."

May did not initially wish to give MPs a vote on withdrawal from the European Union. Nicky Morgan stated "in 2016 MPs aren't asking for a veto but they do want a say and we hope the Prime Minister will remember her earlier words". Anna Soubry and Nick Clegg also called for more parliamentary involvement. In November 2016, the High Court ruled in R (Miller) v Secretary of State for Exiting the European Union that parliament must vote on the decision to leave the EU but May appealed to the Supreme Court. Nicola Sturgeon, Scottish First Minister has joined the case as did representatives from Wales and Northern Ireland. Sturgeon felt that the Scottish Parliament should also consent to the UK triggering of Article 50. She said she was not seeking to prevent England and Wales leaving but wanted to preserve Scotland's place in the EU. In the end the Supreme Court required a vote in the UK parliament.

May was accused of not having a plan if Brexit talks broke down. There were fears that if talks failed Britain could be left trading under WTO rules which it was feared by some analysts would seriously damage jobs and livelihoods in Britain and Europe. May's ministers repeatedly promised to walk away from a bad final deal but, it was argued by some commentators, had no plans for how to manage without a deal. Ivan Rogers described May's Brexit strategy as "an accident waiting to happen". He said completing Brexit was "guaranteed" to take a decade and alleged May's hopes of a trade deal made to order meant that instability in the next few months was "quite likely".

In late October 2018, the National Audit Office claimed that it was already too late to prepare the necessary Irish border security checks in the event of a No-deal scenario—a weakness that could be exploited by criminals.

On 5 February 2019, May gave a speech to business leaders in Belfast to address Brexit stating the United Kingdom's relationship with Ireland was closer than the 26 other members of the EU. She affirmed the government's "absolute" commitment to the Good Friday Agreement and stated that Britain would seek to have no hard border in Northern Ireland.

It was reported in 2020 that former MI6 operative Christopher Steele accused May, while Boris Johnson was foreign secretary, of ignoring claims that Russia may have secretly funded Brexit. Steele accuses May's government of selling British interests short by not taking matters further: "In this case, political considerations seemed to outweigh national security interests. If so, in my view, HMG made a serious mistake in balancing matters of strategic importance to our country."

In July 2020 the Intelligence and Security Committee report on Russia was released. It stated that the British government and intelligence agencies failed to conduct any assessment of Russian attempts to interfere with the 2016 Brexit referendum. It stated the government "had not seen or sought evidence of successful interference in UK democratic processes". Stewart Hosie, SNP member said "The report reveals that no one in government knew if Russia interfered in or sought to influence the referendum because they did not want to know". However, the report stated no firm conclusion could be ascertained on whether the Kremlin had or had not successfully interfered in the referendum.

=== Feminism ===
In 2005, May co-founded the mentoring and pressure group Women2Win. This group and May's personal efforts have been credited with increasing the number of Conservative women MPs and with supporting them. In government she lobbied for improvements to maternity leave, and as home secretary she acted on FGM and introduced a law on coercive control. However, she has been criticised for the financial cuts made by her government, which have been claimed to have had the greatest impact on poor and vulnerable women.

=== Same-sex relationships ===
In 1998, May voted against lowering the age of consent for homosexual acts. May was also a supporter of Section 28, calling a failed repeal in 2000 to be "a victory for commonsense". She was absent for the vote when it was successfully repealed in 2003. She also voted against the Adoption and Children Act 2002 that allowed same-sex couples to adopt.

Beginning in 2012, however, May expressed support for the introduction of same-sex marriage by recording a video for the Out4Marriage campaign, in which she stated "I believe if two people care for each other, if they love each other, if they want to commit to each other... then they should be able to get married and marriage should be for everyone". In May 2013, May voted in favour of the Marriage (Same Sex Couples) Bill, which legalised same-sex marriage in England and Wales. In 2017, May apologised for her past votes while taking credit for helping advance LGBT rights within her party.

== Post-premiership (2019–present) ==
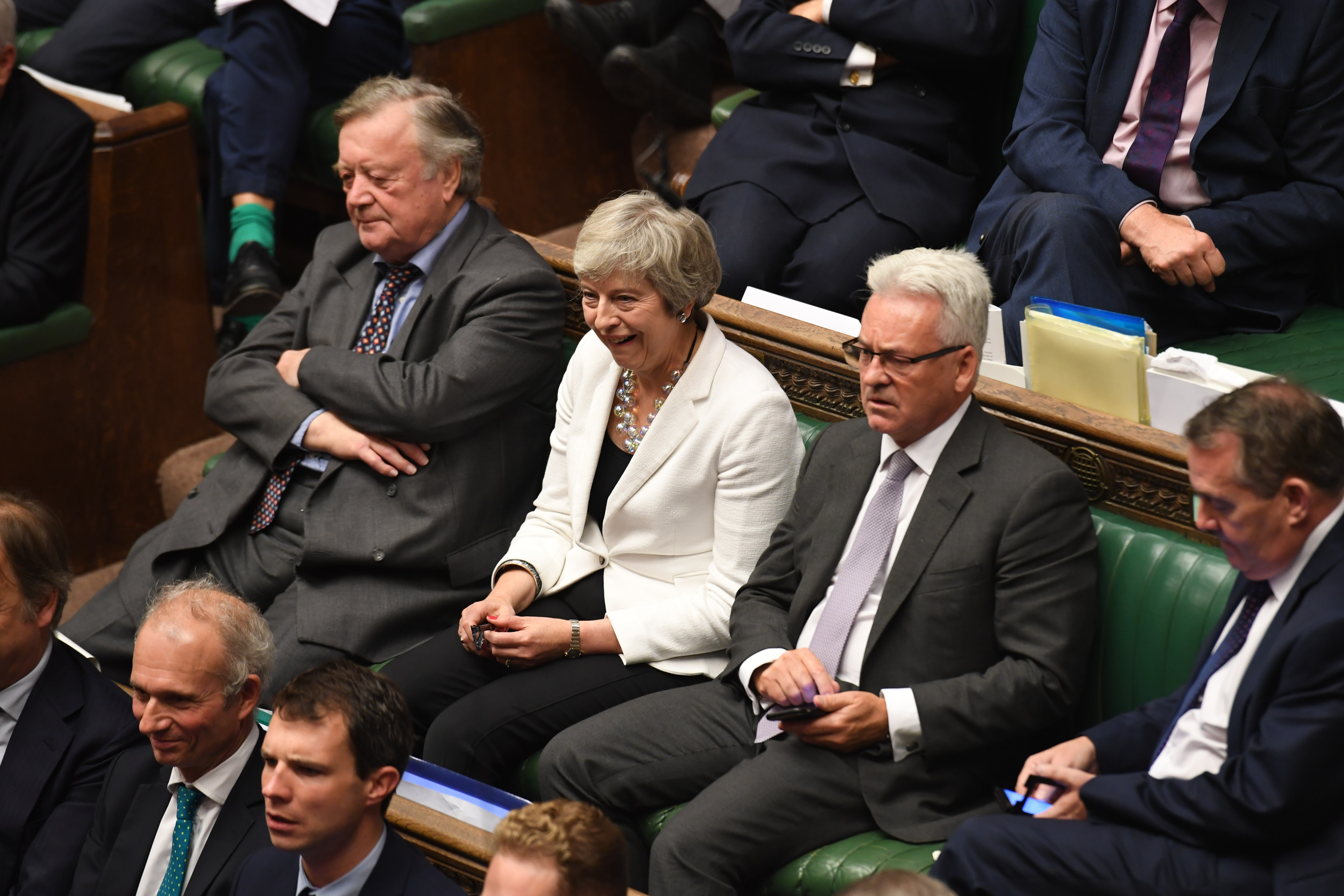
On the backbench between Kenneth Clarke and Sir Alan Duncan in October 2019

After leaving 10 Downing Street, May took her place on the backbenches, remaining an MP to "devote her full time" to her constituency of Maidenhead, Berkshire. In the 2019 general election she was re-elected as the constituency's MP.

In May 2020, May criticised Dominic Cummings when he broke lockdown rules during the COVID-19 pandemic. She abstained in the vote on the second lockdown in Parliament.

On 13 July 2021, May was one of 24 Conservative MPs who voted against their party, defying the whip for the first time in 24 years, over the government's proposal to cut its foreign aid budget. She criticised the government, saying in an address to Parliament, "We made a promise to the poorest people in the world. The Government have broken that promise."

Amid the Partygate scandal, May was critical of Boris Johnson after the publication of the summary of the Sue Gray report, stating "either my right honourable friend had not read the rules or didn't understand what they meant and others around him, or they didn't think the rules applied to Number 10. Which was it?"

On 16 March 2022, after the 2022 Russian invasion of Ukraine, Russia banned May from visiting the country.

In September 2023, the House of Commons official portrait of May by artist Saied Dai was unveiled. In a radio interview with Nick Robinson she said that her Brexit deal would have been better and that she regretted saying "nothing has changed". Also in that month, May's book titled The Abuse of Power - Confronting Injustice in Public Life was published. In October 2023, May appeared as the guest star in 2 episodes of The Rest Is Politics: Leading, hosted by Alastair Campbell, and a former minister in her government, Rory Stewart.

In March 2023, May was reselected as the Conservative candidate for Maidenhead at the 2024 general election, however in March 2024, May announced that she would not seek re-election as an MP at the general election, joining a record number of Conservative MPs standing down at the election. May said she is spending much of her time on causes "close to my heart": "These causes have been taking an increasing amount of my time. Because of this, after much careful thought and consideration, I have realised that, looking ahead, I would no longer be able to do my job as an MP in the way I believe is right and my constituents deserve." Prime Minister Rishi Sunak called May a "relentless campaigner" who had been "fiercely loyal" to Maidenhead, and added that she "defines what it means to be a public servant". Her predecessor David Cameron called her "a brilliant public servant" who could "hold her head high", and said she had done much to "modernise the Conservative Party and promote women in public life". Leader of the Opposition Keir Starmer thanked May for her service, saying that she had "served this House and her constituents with a real sense of duty" and added that her "unwavering commitment to ending modern slavery is commended by all of us." She was succeeded as MP for Maidenhead by Liberal Democrat Joshua Reynolds, the first Liberal MP to be elected to represent this constituency in over 100 years.

May had been mentioned as a possible candidate to replace NATO secretary-general Jens Stoltenberg following his retirement. In June 2021, British Secretary of State for Defence Ben Wallace expressed support for a potential May candidacy, saying "she would be an excellent candidate."

In autumn 2024, May was named the inaugural Blue Senior Fellow at the Blue Center for Global Strategic Assessment, housed in the Jackson School of Global Affairs at Yale University. She served in this role at the university during spring 2025. In September 2025, May was appointed president of Chatham House, the international affairs think tank. In November 2026, May was announced as the first visiting fellow at University of California, Berkeley’s new Nancy Pelosi Institute.

=== Peerage ===
May was nominated for a life peerage in Rishi Sunak's 2024 Dissolution Honours. She was created Baroness May of Maidenhead, of Sonning in the Royal County of Berkshire, on 21 August 2024 and introduced to the House of Lords on 12 September 2024.

== Personal life ==
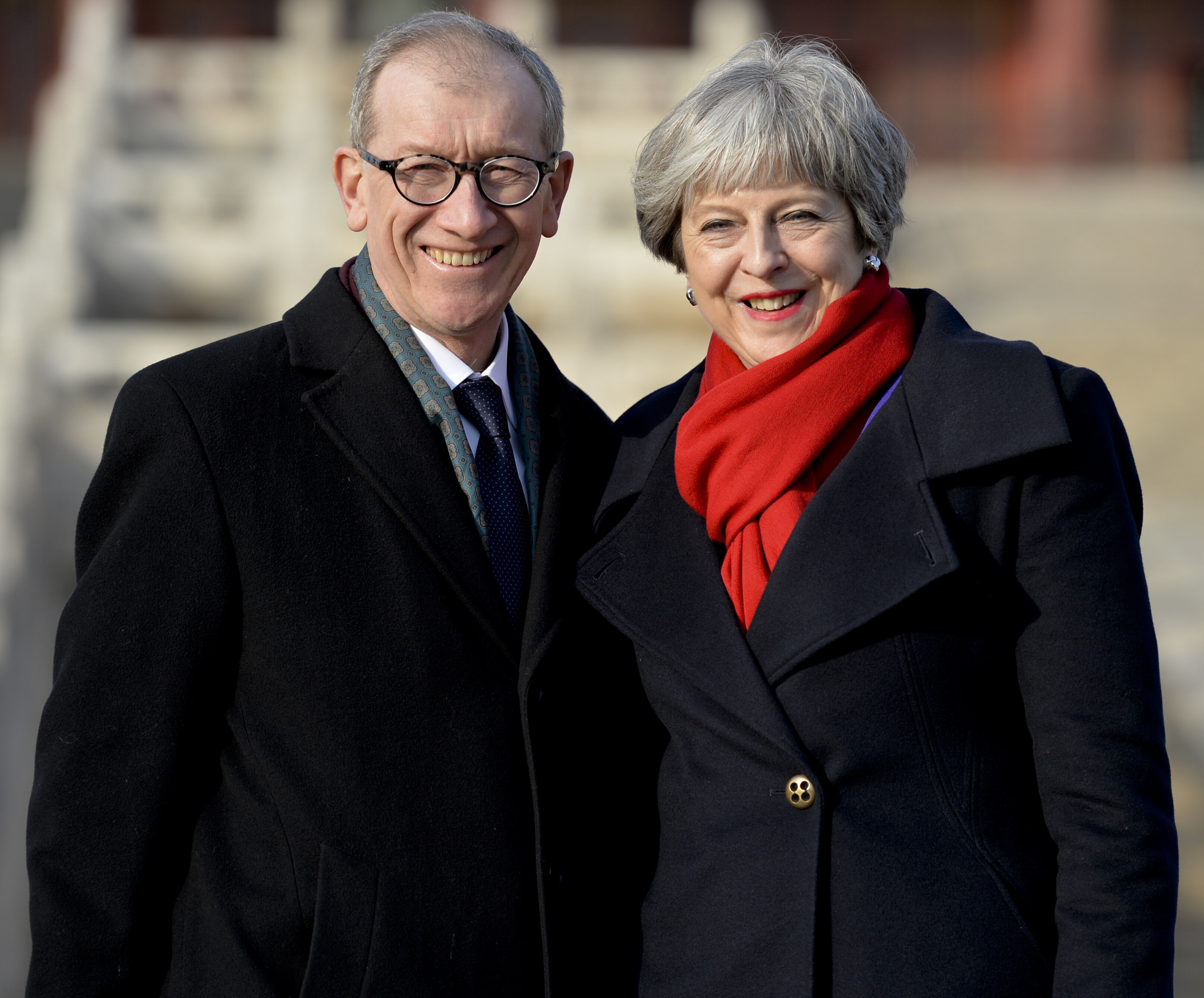
May with her husband Philip at the Forbidden City, Beijing, in 2018

May has been married to Sir Philip May, an investment relationship manager, since 6 September 1980. It has been reported that former prime minister of Pakistan Benazir Bhutto introduced the two during their time at Oxford. May credits future Australian prime minister Malcolm Turnbull for encouraging Philip to propose to her. May has expressed regret that she and her husband did not have children. The Mays are passionate walkers, and they regularly spend their holidays hiking in the Swiss Alps. May is also a cricket fan, stating that Sir Geoffrey Boycott was one of her sporting heroes. She also enjoys cooking, and has said that she owns 100 cookery books. Philip has said that she "is a very good cook".

May and her husband reside in the Thames village of Sonning which is within her former constituency. She is the first cousin once removed of the Labour MP Alistair Strathern.

May is a member of the Church of England and regularly worships at church (usually at St Andrew's, Sonning) on Sundays. The daughter of an Anglican priest, Hubert Brasier, May has said that her Christian faith "is part of me. It is part of who I am and therefore how I approach things". She was raised in the Anglo-Catholic or High Church tradition of Anglicanism, of which her Mirfield-trained father was a proponent.

May is known for a love of fashion, and in particular of distinctive shoes; she wore leopard-print shoes at her 'Nasty Party' speech in 2002, as well as her final Cabinet meeting as home secretary in 2016. On Desert Island Discs in 2014, she chose a subscription to Vogue as her luxury item. However, she has been critical of the media focusing on her fashion instead of her achievements as a politician.

May was diagnosed with diabetes mellitus type 1 in November 2012. She is treated with daily insulin injections.

== Honours and arms ==
=== Commonwealth honours ===
Country	Date	Appointment	Post-nominal letters
United Kingdom	2003 – present	Member of Her Majesty's Most Honourable Privy Council	PC

=== Foreign honours ===
Country	Date	Appointment	Post-nominal letters
Saudi Arabia	2017 – present	Order of King Abdulaziz (Special Class)	
San Marino	2020	Dame of the Grand Cross of the Equestrian Order of Saint Agatha	

=== Scholastic ===
University degrees

Location	Date	School	Degree
England	1977	St Hugh's College, Oxford	Second Class Honours Bachelor of Arts (BA) in Geography

Chancellor, visitor, governor, and fellowships

Location	Date	School	Position
England		University of Reading Conservative Association	Patron

=== Honorary degrees ===
Location	Date	School	Degree	Gave Commencement Address
India	30 November 2014	World Sikh University	Doctorate	Yes

=== Freedom of the City ===
- 30 August 2018: Abuja, Nigeria.

=== Memberships and Fellowships ===
Location	Date	Institution	Position
England		Rotary Club of Maidenhead Thames	Honorary Member
England	November 2021 – present	Clergy Support Trust	Honorary Vice President

=== Awards ===
Prior to and since her appointment to Government, May has actively supported a variety of campaigns on policy issues in her constituency and at national level. She has spoken at the Fawcett Society promoting the cross-party issue of gender equality. She is the Patron of Reading University Conservative Association, in Berkshire (the county of her Maidenhead constituency). Her activism has earned her a number of awards.

She was nominated as one of the society's Inspiring Women of 2006. In February 2013, BBC Radio 4's Woman's Hour described her as Britain's second-most powerful woman after Queen Elizabeth II; May was Home Secretary at the time, and the most senior woman in that government.

In 2001 she was made a Liveryman of the Worshipful Company of Marketors.

In September 2017, she was listed by Forbes as the second most powerful woman in the world, behind Angela Merkel.

=== Arms ===
Coat of arms of Theresa May
Notes Baroness May is not armigerous in her own right, but is entitled to use her husband's shield with a mascle for difference. Coronet that of a Baroness Escutcheon Per fess vert and or three pallets between four roundels in bend counter changed.

== See also ==
- Electoral history of Theresa May

Parliament of the United Kingdom
New constituency	Member of Parliament for Maidenhead; 1997–2024	Succeeded by Joshua Reynolds
Political offices
Preceded by David Willetts	Shadow Secretary of State for Education and Employment; 1999–2001	Succeeded by Damian Green as Shadow Secretary of State for Education and Skills
Preceded by David Willetts	Shadow Secretary of State for Education and Employment; 1999–2001	Succeeded by David Willetts as Shadow Secretary of State for Work and Pensions
Preceded by Gillian Shephard	Shadow Minister for Women; 1999–2001	Succeeded by Caroline Spelman
Preceded by Archie Norman as Shadow Secretary of State for Environment, Transport and the Regions	Shadow Secretary of State for Transport, Local Government and the Regions; 2001–2002	Succeeded by Herself as Shadow Secretary of State for Transport
Preceded by Archie Norman as Shadow Secretary of State for Environment, Transport and the Regions	Shadow Secretary of State for Transport, Local Government and the Regions; 2001–2002	Succeeded by Eric Pickles as Shadow Secretary of State for Local Government and the Regions
Preceded by Herself as Shadow Secretary of State for Transport, Local Government and the Regions	Shadow Secretary of State for Transport; 2002	Succeeded by Tim Collins
Preceded by David Lidington as Shadow Secretary of State for Environment, Food and Rural Affairs	Shadow Secretary of State for Environment and Transport; 2003–2004	Succeeded by Tim Yeo
Preceded by Tim Collins as Shadow Secretary of State for Transport	Shadow Secretary of State for Environment and Transport; 2003–2004	Succeeded by Tim Yeo
New office	Shadow Secretary of State for the Family; 2004–2005	Position abolished
Preceded by John Whittingdale	Shadow Secretary of State for Culture, Media and Sport; 2005	Succeeded by Hugo Swire
Preceded by Chris Grayling	Shadow Leader of the House of Commons; 2005–2009	Succeeded by Alan Duncan
Preceded by Eleanor Laing	Shadow Minister for Women and Equality; 2007–2010	Succeeded by Yvette Cooper
Preceded by Chris Grayling	Shadow Secretary of State for Work and Pensions; 2009–2010	Succeeded by Yvette Cooper
Preceded by Harriet Harman as Minister for Women and Equality	Minister for Women and Equalities; 2010–2012	Succeeded by Maria Miller
Preceded by Alan Johnson	Home Secretary; 2010–2016	Succeeded by Amber Rudd
Preceded by David Cameron	Prime Minister of the United Kingdom; 2016–2019	Succeeded by Boris Johnson
Preceded by David Cameron	Minister for the Civil Service; 2016–2019	Succeeded by Boris Johnson
Preceded by David Cameron	First Lord of the Treasury; 2016–2019	Succeeded by Boris Johnson
Party political offices
Preceded by David Davis	Chairman of the Conservative Party; 2002–2003	Succeeded by Liam Fox
Preceded by David Davis	Chairman of the Conservative Party; 2002–2003	Succeeded by The Lord Saatchi
Preceded by David Cameron	Leader of the Conservative Party; 2016–2019	Succeeded by Boris Johnson
Diplomatic posts
Preceded by Joseph Muscat	Commonwealth Chair-in-Office; 2018–2019	Succeeded by Boris Johnson
