= Electoral history of Theresa May =

Elections featuring UK Prime Minister

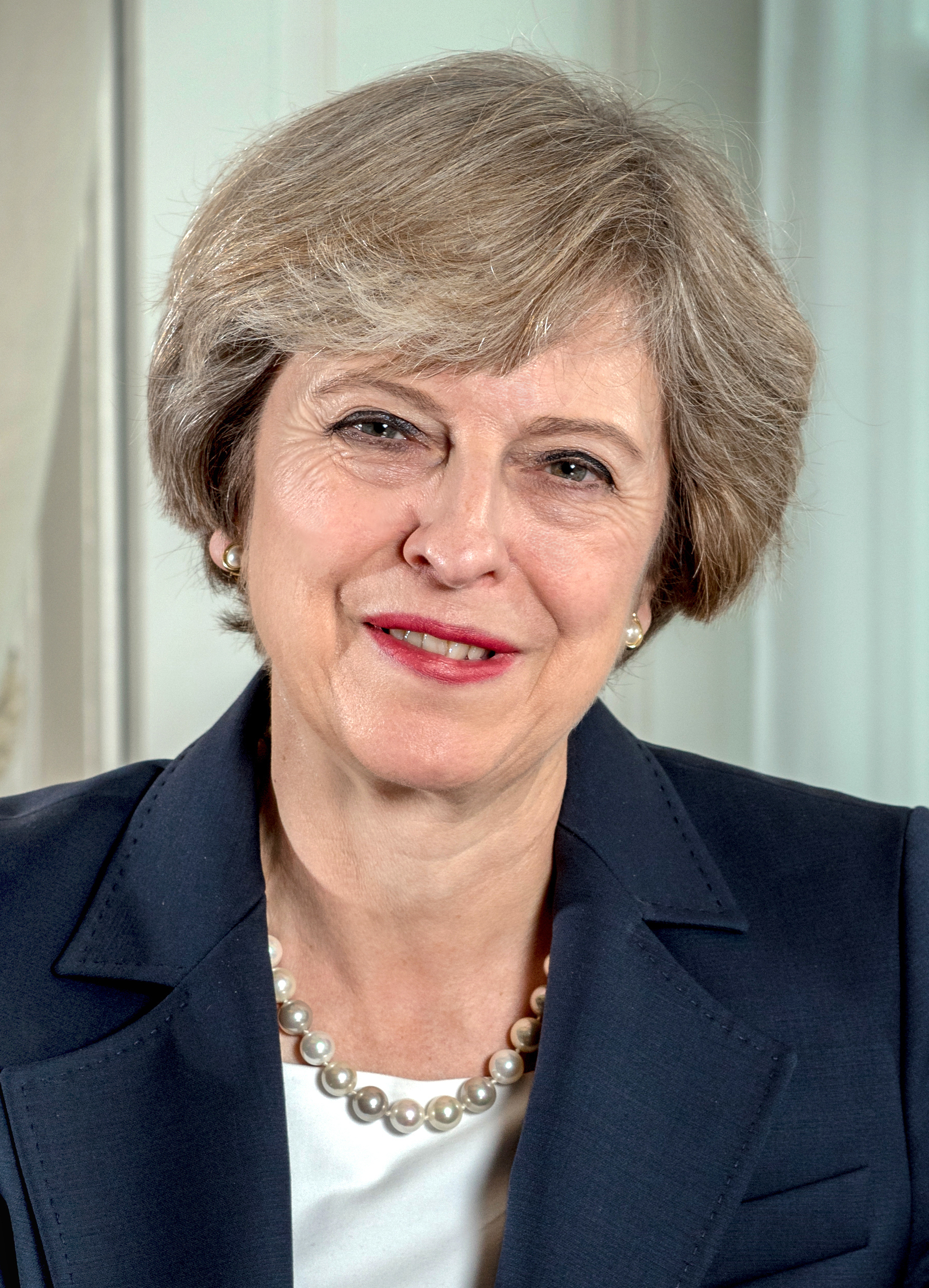

This is a summary of the electoral history of Theresa May, who served as Prime Minister of the United Kingdom and Leader of the Conservative Party from 2016 to 2019. She was the member of parliament (MP) for Maidenhead from 1997 to 2024.

== Council elections ==
=== 1986 Merton London Borough Council election, Durnsford ===
Durnsford (2)
Party	Candidate	Votes	%	±%
Conservative	Geoffrey Gill	857	36.7%	
Conservative	Theresa May	818		
Labour	Arthur Kennedy	734	32.1%	
Liberal	Susan Knibbs	731	31.2%	
Labour	Anthony J. Colman	730		
Liberal	Richard Barraclough	692		
Turnout		4,562		
Conservative hold		Swing		
Conservative hold		Swing		

=== 1990 Merton London Borough Council election, Durnsford ===
Durnsford (2)
Party	Candidate	Votes	%
Conservative	Theresa May*	1,063	43.87
Conservative	Barry Edwards	1,049	
Labour	Arthur Kennedy	913	36.64
Labour	Nina Scowen	852	
Liberal Democrats	Susan Knibbs	317	11.72
Liberal Democrats	Philip Rumney	246	
Green	Keith Parke	187	7.77
Registered electors		4,065	
Turnout		2,424	59.63
Rejected ballots		3	0.12
Conservative hold			
Conservative hold			

== Parliamentary elections ==
=== 1992 general election, North West Durham ===
General election 1992: North West Durham
Party	Candidate	Votes	%	±%
Labour	Hilary Armstrong	26,734	57.8	+6.9
Conservative	Theresa May	12,747	27.6	−0.8
Liberal Democrats	Tim Farron	6,728	14.6	−6.1
Majority		13,987	30.2	+7.7
Turnout		46,209	75.5	+2.0
Labour hold		Swing	+3.4	

=== 1994 by-election, Barking ===
1994 Barking by-election
Party	Candidate	Votes	%	±%
Labour	Margaret Hodge	13,704	72.1	+20.5
Liberal Democrats	Gary White	2,290	12.0	−2.5
Conservative	Theresa May	1,976	10.4	−23.5
National Front	Gary Needs	551	2.9	N/A
UKIP	Gerard Batten	406	2.1	N/A
Natural Law	Heather Butensky	90	0.5	N/A
Majority		11,414	60.0	+42.3
Turnout		19,017	38.3	−31.7
Registered electors		49,635		
Labour hold		Swing	+11.5	

=== 1997 general election, Maidenhead ===
General election 1997: Maidenhead
Party	Candidate	Votes	%	±%
Conservative	Theresa May	25,344	49.8	−11.8
Liberal Democrats	Andrew Ketteringham	13,363	26.3	−3.5
Labour	Denise Robson	9,205	18.1	+9.5
Referendum	Charles Taverner	1,638	3.2	N/A
Liberal	David Munkley	896	1.8	N/A
UKIP	Neil Spiers	277	0.5	N/A
Glow Bowling Party	Kristian Ardley	166	0.3	N/A
Majority		11,981	23.5	
Turnout		50,889	75.6	
Conservative win (new seat)				

=== 2001 general election, Maidenhead ===
General election 2001: Maidenhead
Party	Candidate	Votes	%	±%
Conservative	Theresa May	19,506	45.0	−4.8
Liberal Democrats	Kathryn Newbound	16,222	37.4	+11.1
Labour	John O'Farrell	6,577	15.2	−2.9
UKIP	Dennis Cooper	741	1.7	+1.2
Monster Raving Loony	Lloyd Clarke	272	0.6	N/A
Majority		3,284	7.6	−15.9
Turnout		43,318	62.0	−13.6
Conservative hold		Swing	−8.0	

=== 2005 general election, Maidenhead ===
General election 2005: Maidenhead
Party	Candidate	Votes	%	±%
Conservative	Theresa May	23,312	50.8	+5.8
Liberal Democrats	Kathryn Newbound	17,081	37.3	−0.1
Labour	Janet Pritchard	4,144	9.0	−6.2
BNP	Tim Rait	704	1.5	N/A
UKIP	Douglas Lewis	609	1.3	−0.4
Majority		6,231	13.5	+5.9
Turnout		45,850	71.7	+9.7
Conservative hold		Swing	+3.0	

=== 2010 general election, Maidenhead ===
General election 2010: Maidenhead
Party	Candidate	Votes	%	±%
Conservative	Theresa May	31,937	59.5	+7.6
Liberal Democrats	Tony Hill	15,168	28.2	−8.0
Labour	Patrick McDonald	3,795	7.1	−2.1
UKIP	Kenneth Wright	1,243	2.3	+0.9
BNP	Tim Rait	825	1.5	+0.1
Green	Peter Forbes	482	0.9	N/A
Freedom and Responsibility	Peter Prior	270	0.5	N/A
Majority		16,769	31.3	+18.6
Turnout		53,720	73.7	+3.4
Conservative hold		Swing	+7.8	

=== 2015 general election, Maidenhead ===
General election 2015: Maidenhead
Party	Candidate	Votes	%	±%
Conservative	Theresa May	35,453	65.8	+6.3
Labour	Charlie Smith	6,394	11.9	+4.8
Liberal Democrats	Tony Hill	5,337	9.9	−18.3
UKIP	Herbie Crossman	4,539	8.4	+6.1
Green	Emily Blyth	1,915	3.6	+2.7
Independent	Ian Taplin	162	0.3	N/A
Class War	Joe Wilcox	55	0.1	N/A
Majority		29,059	53.9	+22.6
Turnout		53,855	72.6	−1.1
Conservative hold		Swing		

=== 2017 general election, Maidenhead ===
General election 2017: Maidenhead
Party	Candidate	Votes	%	±%
Conservative	Theresa May	37,718	64.8	−1.0
Labour	Patrick McDonald	11,261	19.3	+7.4
Liberal Democrats	Tony Hill	6,540	11.2	+1.3
Green	Derek Wall	907	1.6	−2.0
UKIP	Gerard Batten	871	1.5	−6.9
Animal Welfare	Andrew Knight	282	0.5	N/A
No label	Lord Buckethead	249	0.4	N/A
Independent	Grant Smith	152	0.3	N/A
Monster Raving Loony	Howling Laud Hope	119	0.2	N/A
CPA	Edmonds Victor	69	0.1	N/A
The Just Political Party	Julian Reid	52	0.1	N/A
Independent	Yemi Hailemariam	16	0.0	N/A
No label	Bobby Smith	3	0.0	N/A
Majority		26,457	45.5	−8.6
Turnout		58,239	76.4	+3.8
Conservative hold		Swing	−4.2	

=== 2019 general election, Maidenhead ===
General election 2019: Maidenhead
Party	Candidate	Votes	%	±%
Conservative	Theresa May	32,620	57.7	−6.9
Liberal Democrats	Joshua Reynolds	13,774	24.4	+13.2
Labour	Patrick McDonald	7,882	14.0	−5.3
Green	Emily Tomalin	2,216	3.9	+2.3
Majority		18,846	33.3	−12.2
Turnout		56,492	73.7	−2.7
Conservative hold		Swing	−10.1	

== 2016 Conservative Party leadership election ==
Candidate	First ballot: 5 July 2016		Second ballot: 7 July 2016		Members' vote (Cancelled)	
Candidate	Votes	%	Votes	%	Votes	%
Theresa May	165	50.2	199	60.5	Unopposed	
Andrea Leadsom	66	20.1	84	25.5	Withdrew	
Michael Gove	48	14.6	46	14.0	Eliminated	
Stephen Crabb	34	10.3	Withdrew, endorsed May			
Liam Fox	16	4.9	Eliminated, endorsed May			
Turnout	329	99.7	329	99.7	—N/a	
Theresa May unopposed

View source data.

== 2017 United Kingdom general election ==
Results of the June 2017 House of Commons of the United Kingdom results
Political party	Leader	MPs						Votes		
Political party	Leader	Candidates	Total	Gained	Lost	Net	Of total (%)	Total	Of total (%)	Change (%)
Conservative	Theresa May	638	317	20	33	−13	48.8	13,636,684	42.3	+5.5
Labour	Jeremy Corbyn	631 (Note: Includes 52 Co-operative Party candidates, as part of the Labour-Co-op alliance)	262 (Note: Includes 38 Co-operative Party MPs, as part of the Labour-Co-op alliance)	36 (Note: Includes 14 Co-operative Party MPs, as part of the Labour-Co-op alliance)	6	+30 (Note: Includes +14 Co-operative Party MPs, as part of the Labour-Co-op alliance)	40.3 (Note: Includes 5.8% for the Co-operative Party, as part of the Labour-Co-op alliance)	12,877,918 (Note: Includes 1,350,007 for the Co-operative Party, as part of the Labour-Co-op alliance)	40.0 (Note: Includes 4.2% for the Co-operative Party, as part of the Labour-Co-op alliance)	+9.6 (Note: Includes +1.4% for the Co-operative Party, as part of the Labour-Co-op alliance)
Liberal Democrats	Tim Farron	629	12	8	4	+4	1.8	2,371,861	7.4	−0.5
SNP	Nicola Sturgeon	59	35	0	21	−21	5.4	977,568	3.0	−1.7
UKIP	Paul Nuttall	378	0	0	1	−1	0	594,068	1.8	−10.8
Green Party of England and Wales	Caroline Lucas and Jonathan Bartley	457	1	0	0	0	0.2	512,327	1.6	−2.0
DUP	Arlene Foster	17	10	2	0	+2	1.5	292,316	0.9	+0.3
Sinn Féin	Gerry Adams	18	7	3	0	+3	1.1	238,915	0.7	+0.1
Plaid Cymru	Leanne Wood	40	4	1	0	+1	0.6	164,466	0.5	−0.1
Independent		187	1	0	0	0	0.2	151,471	0.5	+0.2
SDLP	Colum Eastwood	18	0	0	3	−3	0	95,419	0.3	0.0
UUP	Robin Swann	14	0	0	2	−2	0	83,280	0.3	−0.1
Alliance	Naomi Long	18	0	0	0	0	0	64,553	0.2	0.0
Speaker	John Bercow	1	1	0	0	0	0.2	34,299	0.1	0.0
Yorkshire	Stewart Arnold	21	0	0	0	0	0	20,958	0.1	+0.1
NHA	Alex Ashman	5	0	0	0	0	0	16,119	0.1	−0.1
Green Party Northern Ireland	Steven Agnew	7	0	0	0	0	0	7,452	0.0	0.0
Scottish Green Party	Patrick Harvie and Maggie Chapman	3	0	0	0	0	0	5,886	0.0	−0.1
CPA	Sidney Cordle	31	0	0	0	0	0	5,869	0.0	0.0
People Before Profit	Eamonn McCann	2	0	0	0	0	0	5,509	0.0	0.0
Ashfield Independents		1	0	0	0	0	0	4,612	0.0	0.0
BNP	Adam Walker	10	0	0	0	0	0	4,580	0.0	0.0
Monster Raving Loony	Alan Hope	12	0	0	0	0	0	3,890	0.0	0.0
Liberal	Steve Radford	4	0	0	0	0	0	3,672	0.0	0.0
Women's Equality	Sophie Walker	7	0	0	0	0	0	3,580	0.0	0.0
TUV	Jim Allister	1	0	0	0	0	0	3,282	0.0	−0.1
North East Party	Mary Cartwright	1	0	0	0	0	0	2,355	0.0	0.0
Pirate	David A Elston	10	0	0	0	0	0	2,321	0.0	0.0
English Democrat	Robin Tilbrook	7	0	0	0	0	0	1,913	0.0	0.0
Christian	Jeff Green	2	0	0	0	0	0	1,720	0.0	0.0
Independent Save Withybush Save Lives		1	0	0	0	0	0	1,209	0.0	0.0
Socialist Labour	Arthur Scargill	3	0	0	0	0	0	1,154	0.0	0.0
Animal Welfare	Vanessa Hudson	4	0	0	0	0	0	955	0.0	0.0
JAC		2	0	0	0	0	0	842	0.0	0.0
Southampton Independents		1	0	0	0	0	0	816	0.0	0.0
Workers Revolutionary	Sheila Torrance	5	0	0	0	0	0	771	0.0	0.0
Workers' Party		2	0	0	0	0	0	708	0.0	0.0
Something New		2	0	0	0	0	0	552	0.0	0.0
Demos Direct Initiative Party		1	0	0	0	0	0	551	0.0	0.0
Libertarian	Adam Brown	4	0	0	0	0	0	524	0.0	0.0
SDP	Peter Johnson	6	0	0	0	0	0	469	0.0	0.0
Peace	John Morris	2	0	0	0	0	0	468	0.0	0.0
Friends Party		3	0	0	0	0	0	435	0.0	0.0
Better for Bradford		1	0	0	0	0	0	420	0.0	0.0
All other parties		38	0	0	0	0	0	5,447	0.0	0.0
Total		3,304	650					32,204,184		
