= Shadow Secretary of State for the Family =

2004–2005 position within the UK Conservative shadow cabinet

- Incumbent; Abolished since 6 December 2005
- Appointer: Leader of the Opposition
- Inaugural holder: Theresa May
- Formation: 15 June 2004
- Abolished: 6 December 2005

The Shadow Secretary of State for the Family was a short-lived position in the British Shadow Cabinet. It was created in 2004 by then Conservative Party leader, and Leader of the Opposition, Michael Howard. It was an unusual Shadow Cabinet role in that it did not shadow a specific department or Secretary of State, rather it shadowed various responsibilities of other departments such as the Department for Education and Skills.

The role was held by only one person, Theresa May, who for much of her tenure held it in conjunction with the job of Shadow Secretary of State for Culture, Media and Sport.

The position was abolished by David Cameron when he was elected Leader of the Conservative Party and Leader of the Opposition on 6 December 2005.

== List of Shadow Secretaries of State for the Family ==
- Theresa May MP (15 June 2004 - 6 December 2005)
