= List of guests at the coronation of Charles III and Camilla =

Countries from which at least one representative attended the coronation of Charles III and Camilla on 6 May 2023.

The coronation of Charles III and Camilla as king and queen of the United Kingdom and the other Commonwealth realms took place on 6 May 2023. Approximately 2,200 people were invited to attend the event, including members of the royal family, representatives of the Church of England and other Christian denominations, prominent politicians from the United Kingdom and the Commonwealth of Nations, foreign royalty, heads of state and heads of government, and British and foreign celebrities.

Guests from 203 countries were invited to attend the service. Representatives from at least 158 countries, including 154 UN member states, two UN observer states and Kosovo (Note: Kosovo's declaration of independence is recognised by the United Kingdom.) attended. These representatives included 16 monarchs, 70 heads of state, and 20 prime ministers, which was one of the largest gathering of statesmen and world leaders in history. Many of these guests also attended the coronation reception on 5 May and the coronation concert on 7 May.

== British royal family and relatives ==
=== House of Windsor ===
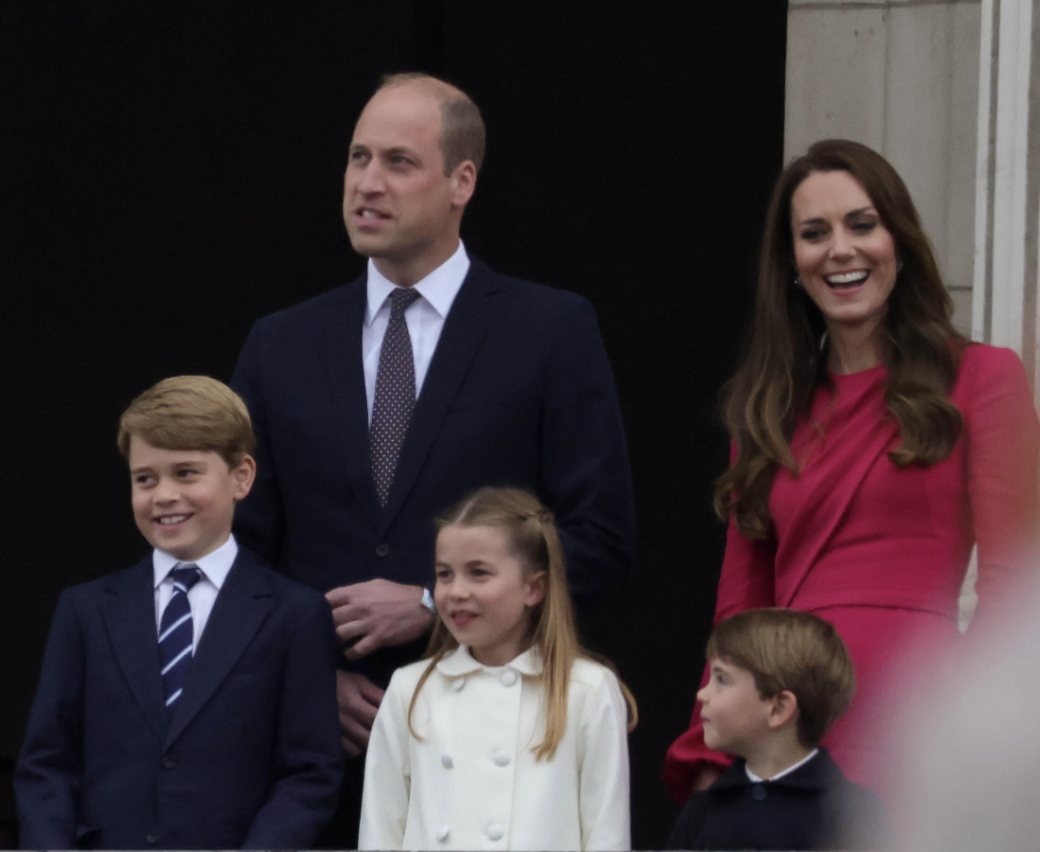
The Prince and Princess of Wales, along with their children Prince George, Princess Charlotte, and Prince Louis (shown on the balcony of Buckingham Palace during the Platinum Jubilee of Elizabeth II), attended the coronation.

- The Prince and Princess of Wales, the King's son and daughter-in-law
  - Prince George of Wales, the King's grandson (page of honour to the King)
  - Princess Charlotte of Wales, the King's granddaughter
  - Prince Louis of Wales, the King's grandson
- The Duke of Sussex, the King's son
- The Princess Royal (gold-stick-in-waiting to the King) and Vice Admiral Sir Timothy Laurence, the King's sister and brother-in-law
  - Peter Phillips, the King's nephew
  - Zara and Michael Tindall, the King's niece and her husband
- The Duke of York, the King's brother
  - Princess Beatrice and Edoardo Mapelli Mozzi, the King's niece and her husband
  - Princess Eugenie and Jack Brooksbank, the King's niece and her husband
- The Duke and Duchess of Edinburgh, the King's brother and sister-in-law
  - Lady Louise Mountbatten-Windsor, the King's niece
  - Earl of Wessex, the King's nephew
- The Princess Margaret, Countess of Snowdon's family:
  - The Earl of Snowdon, the King's first cousin
    - Viscount Linley, the King's first cousin once removed
    - Lady Margarita Armstrong-Jones, the King's first cousin once removed
  - Lady Sarah and Daniel Chatto, the King's first cousin and her husband
    - Samuel Chatto, the King's first cousin once removed

Other descendants of the King's maternal great-grandfather King George V and their families:

- The Duke and Duchess of Gloucester, the King's first cousin once removed and his wife
  - Earl of Ulster, the King's second cousin
  - Lady Davina Windsor, the King's second cousin
  - Lady Rose Gilman, the King's second cousin
- The Duke of Kent, the King's first cousin once removed
  - Earl of St Andrews, the King's second cousin
  - Lady Helen Taylor, the King's second cousin
  - Lord Nicholas Windsor, the King's second cousin
- Princess Alexandra, The Hon. Lady Ogilvy, the King's first cousin once removed
  - James Ogilvy, the King's second cousin
  - Marina Ogilvy, the King's second cousin
- Prince and Princess Michael of Kent, the King's first cousin once removed and his wife
  - Lord Frederick Windsor, the King's second cousin
  - Lady Gabriella Kingston, the King's second cousin

=== Bowes-Lyon family ===
- Sir Simon and Lady Bowes-Lyon, the King's first cousin once removed and his wife

=== Mountbatten family ===
- The Countess Mountbatten of Burma, wife of the King's second cousin

=== Parker Bowles family ===
- Andrew Parker Bowles, the Queen's ex-husband
  - Thomas and Sara Parker Bowles, the Queen's son (also the King's godson) and ex-daughter-in-law
    - Lola Parker Bowles, the Queen's granddaughter
    - Frederick Parker Bowles, the Queen's grandson (page of honour to the Queen)
  - Laura and Harry Lopes, the Queen's daughter and son-in-law
    - Eliza Lopes, the Queen's granddaughter
    - Louis Lopes, the Queen's grandson (page of honour to the Queen)
    - Gus Lopes, the Queen's grandson (page of honour to the Queen)

=== Shand family ===
- Annabel Elliot, the Queen's sister (lady-in-attendance)
  - Benjamin and Mary-Clare Elliot, the Queen's nephew and niece-in-law
    - Arthur Elliot, the Queen's great-nephew (page of honour to the Queen)
    - Ike Elliot, the Queen's great-nephew
  - Alice and Luke Irwin, the Queen's niece and nephew-in-law
    - Otis Irwin, the Queen's great-nephew
    - Violet Irwin, the Queen's great-niece
  - Catherine Elliot and Younes Zrikem, the Queen's niece and her partner
- Ayesha Shand, the Queen's niece (via Mark Shand)

=== Cubitt family ===
- The Dowager Lady Ashcombe, widow of the Queen's maternal uncle and godfather

=== Middleton family ===
- Michael and Carole Middleton, the Princess of Wales's parents
  - Philippa Matthews, the Princess of Wales's sister
  - James Middleton, the Princess of Wales's brother

== United Kingdom ==
=== Prime Ministers ===
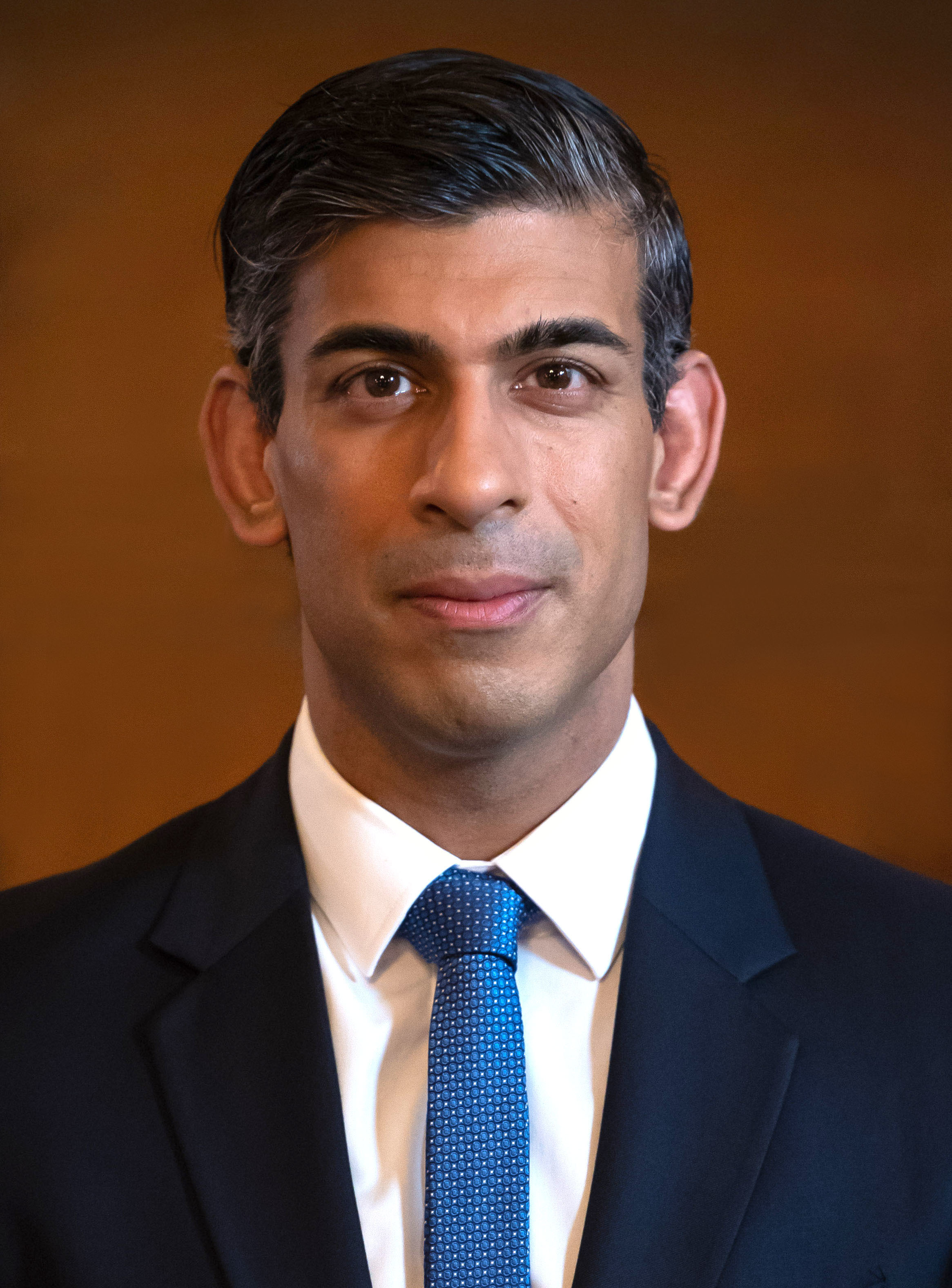
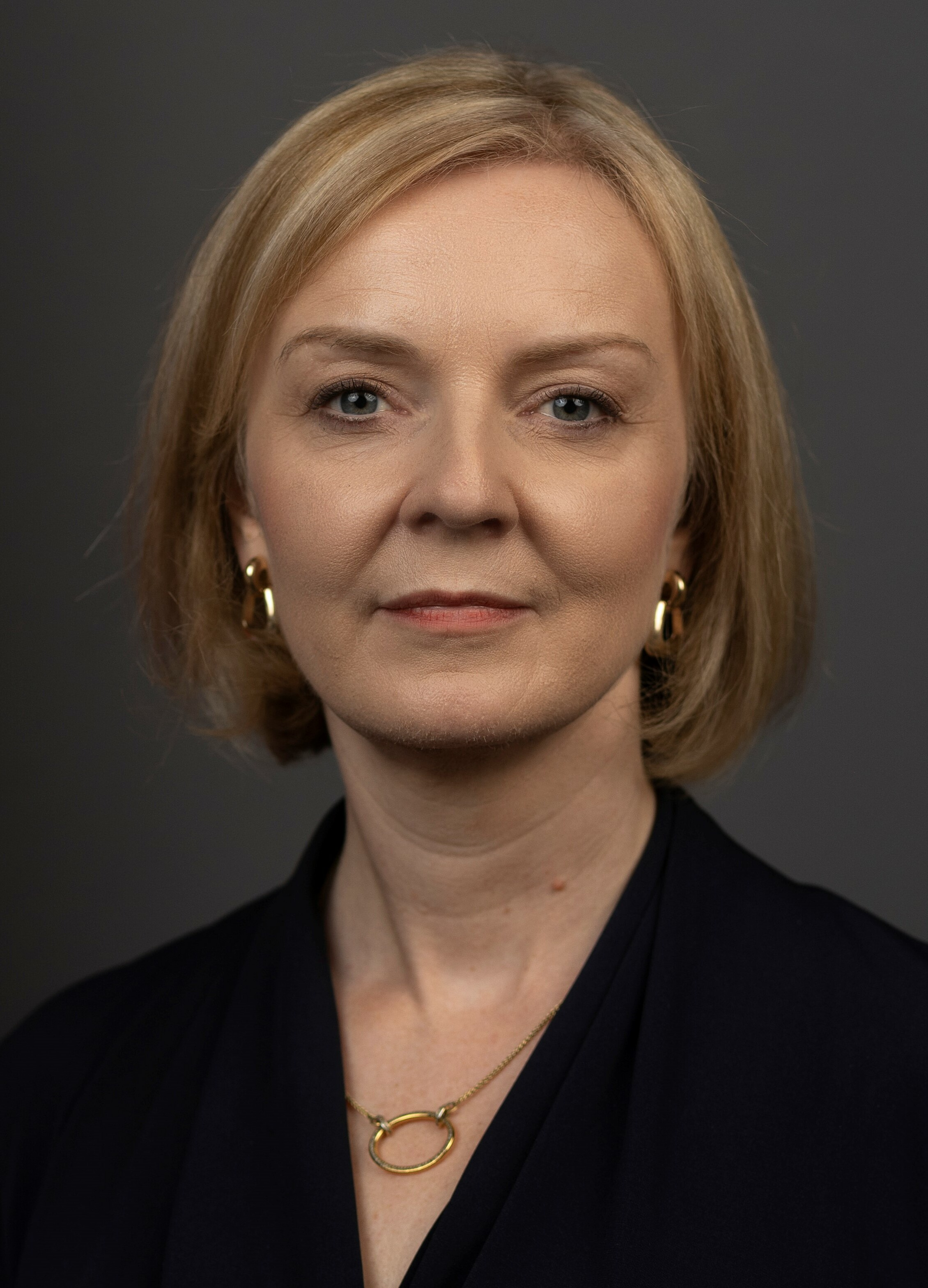
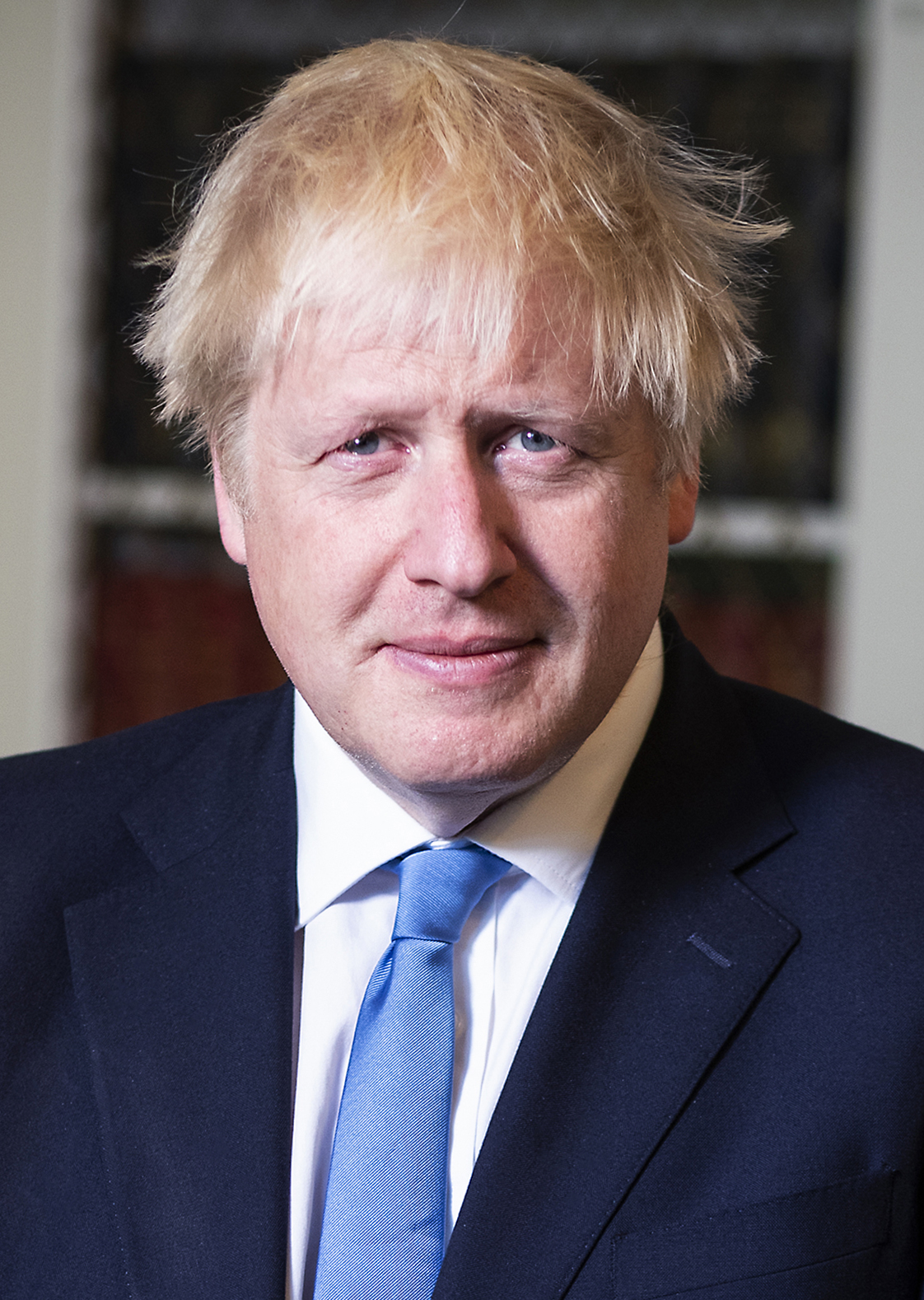
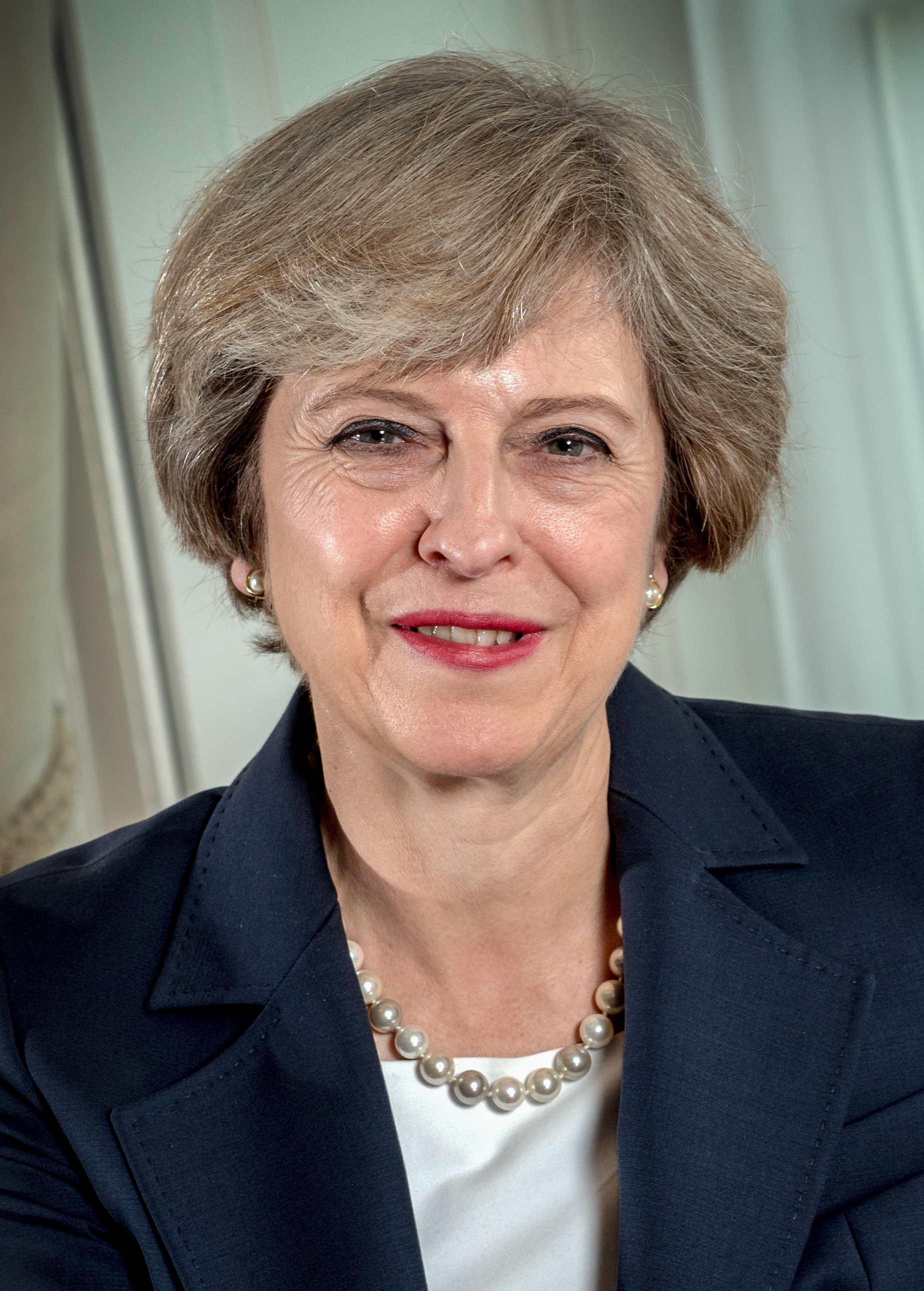
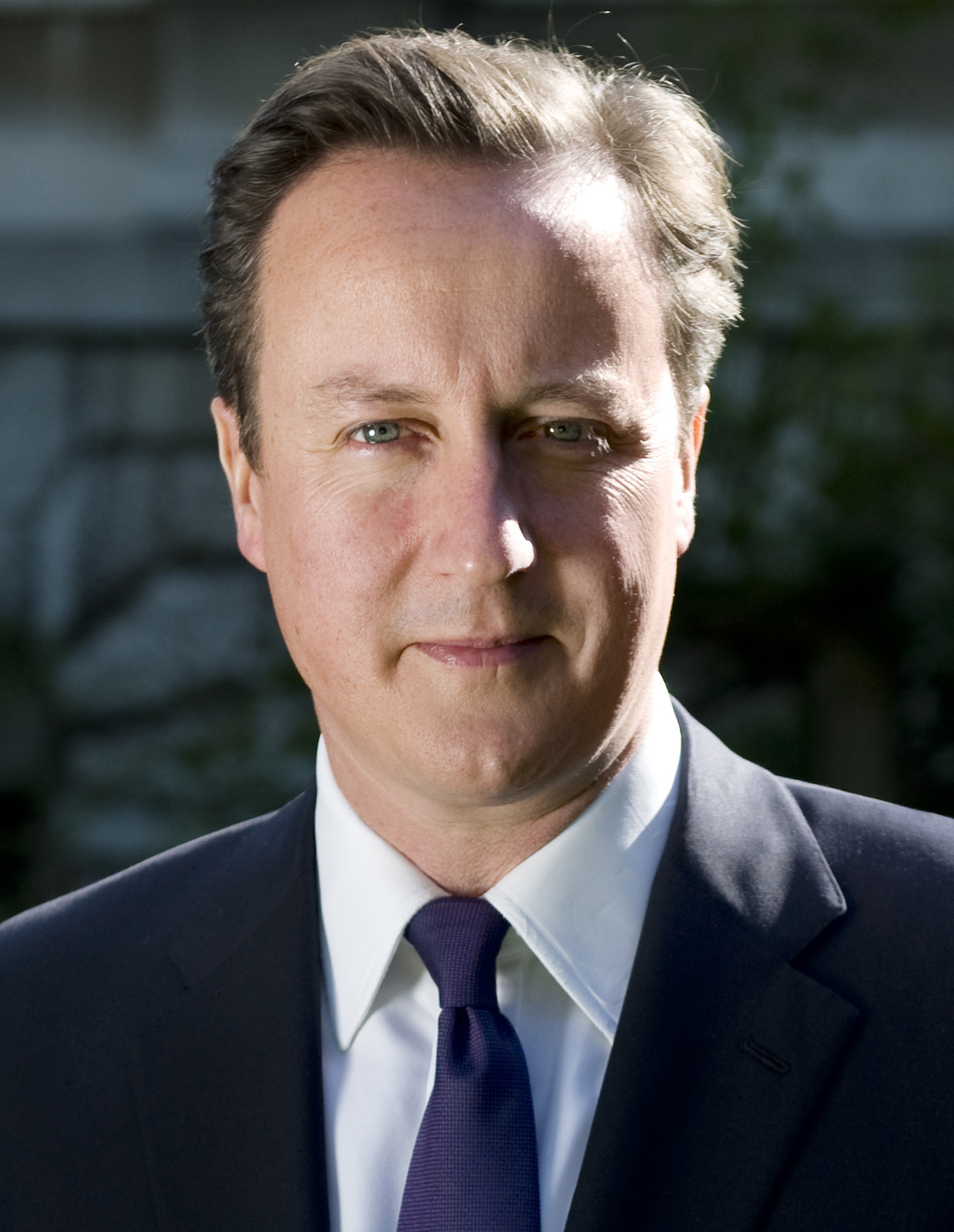
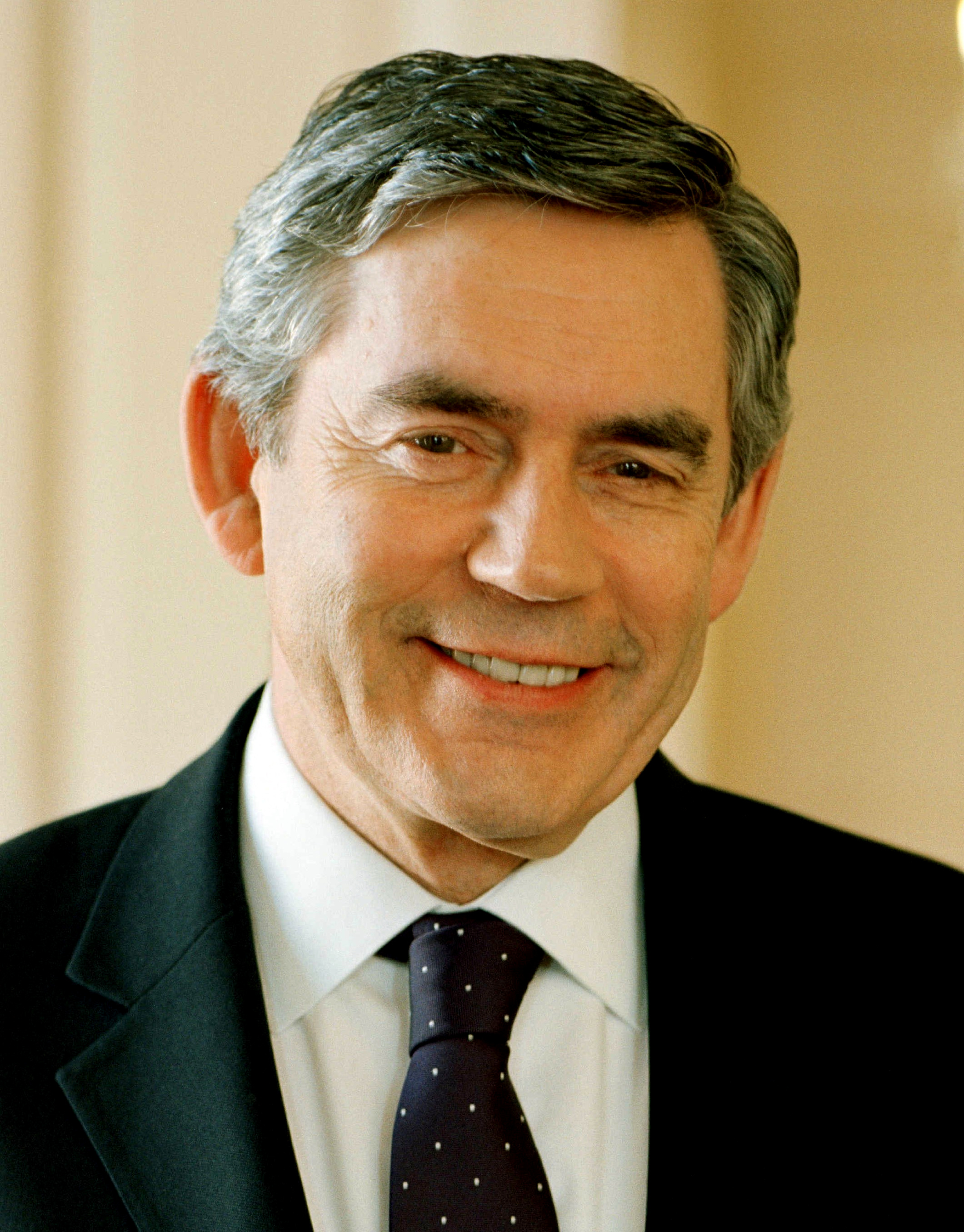
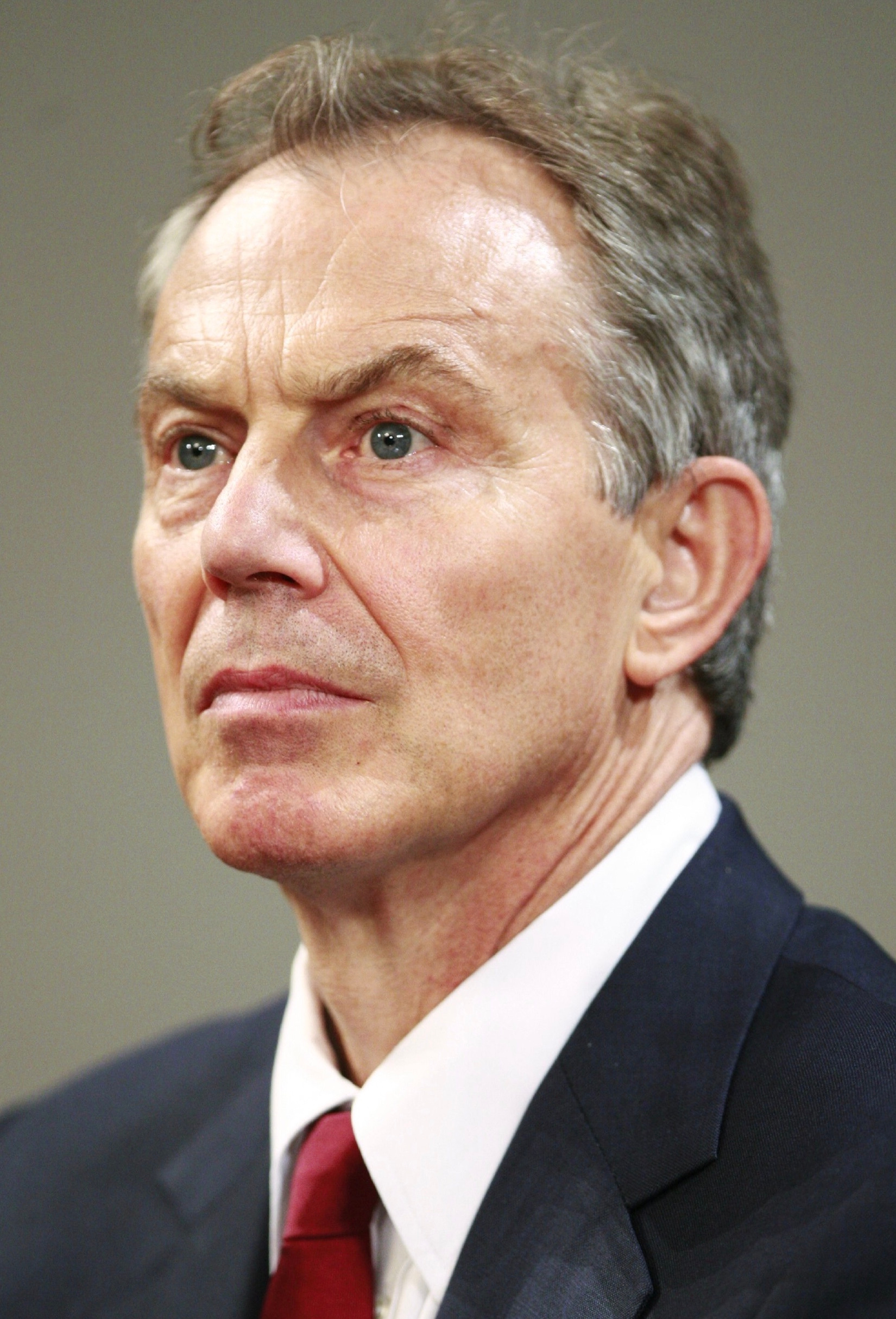
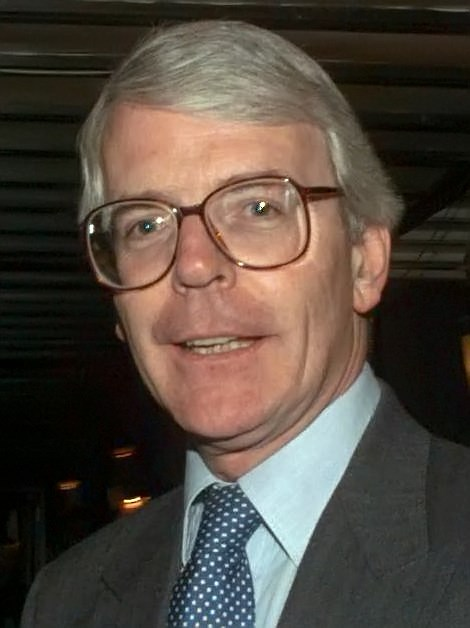
The incumbent British prime minister, Rishi Sunak (top left), along with all seven living former British prime ministers, attended the coronation
- Rishi Sunak, Prime Minister of the United Kingdom, and his wife Akshata Murty
  - Sir John Major, former Prime Minister of the United Kingdom (1990–1997)
  - Sir Tony Blair, former Prime Minister of the United Kingdom (1997–2007), and his wife Lady (Cherie) Blair
  - Gordon Brown, former Prime Minister of the United Kingdom (2007–2010), and his wife Sarah Brown
  - David Cameron, former Prime Minister of the United Kingdom (2010–2016), and his wife Samantha Cameron
  - Lady (Theresa) May, former Prime Minister of the United Kingdom (2016–2019), and her husband Sir Philip May
  - Boris Johnson, former Prime Minister of the United Kingdom (2019–2022), and his wife Carrie Johnson
  - Liz Truss, former Prime Minister of the United Kingdom (2022), and her husband Hugh O'Leary

=== Great Officers of State ===
==== England ====
- General Sir Gordon Messenger, Lord High Steward of England
- Alex Chalk, Lord High Chancellor of Great Britain and Secretary of State for Justice
- Penny Mordaunt, Lord President of the Council and Leader of the House of Commons, bearing the Sword of State
- Nicholas True, Baron True, Lord Keeper of the Privy Seal and Leader of the House of Lords
- Rupert Carington, 7th Baron Carrington, Lord Great Chamberlain, presenting the Golden Spurs
- Admiral Sir Tony Radakin, Lord High Constable of England and Chief of the Defence Staff
- Edward Fitzalan-Howard, 18th Duke of Norfolk, Earl Marshal

==== Scotland ====
- Anthony Lindsay, 30th Earl of Crawford, Deputy to the Great Steward of Scotland
- Merlin Hay, 24th Earl of Erroll, Lord High Constable of Scotland

=== Officers of arms ===
Information from this section taken from the official order of service.

==== England ====
- David White, Garter Principal King of Arms
- Timothy Duke, Clarenceux King of Arms
- Robert Noel, Norroy and Ulster King of Arms
- Clive Cheesman, Richmond Herald
- Peter O'Donoghue, York Herald
- Christopher Fletcher-Vane, Chester Herald
- John Allen-Petrie, Windsor Herald
- John Martin Robinson, Maltravers Herald Extraordinary
- David Rankin-Hunt, Norfolk Herald Extraordinary
- Thomas Lloyd, Wales Herald Extraordinary
- Professor Anne Curry, Arundel Herald Extraordinary
- Adam Tuck, Rouge Dragon Pursuivant
- Mark Scott, Bluemantle Pursuivant
- Dominic Ingram, Portcullis Pursuivant
- Thomas Johnston, Rouge Croix Pursuivant

==== Scotland ====
- Joseph Morrow, Lord Lyon King of Arms
- Adam Bruce, Marchmont Herald
- Liam Devlin, Rothesay Herald
- Sir Crispin Agnew of Lochnaw, Albany Herald Extraordinary
- George Way of Plean, Carrick Pursuivant
- John Stirling, Ormond Pursuivant
- Roderick Alexander Macpherson, Unicorn Pursuivant
- Colin Russell, Falkland Pursuivant Extraordinary
- Professor Gillian Black, Linlithgow Pursuivant Extraordinary
- Philip Tibbetts, March Pursuivant Extraordinary

=== Members of the Cabinet ===
- Oliver Dowden, Deputy Prime Minister of the United Kingdom and Chancellor of the Duchy of Lancaster
- Jeremy Hunt, Chancellor of the Exchequer
- James Cleverly, Secretary of State for Foreign, Commonwealth and Development Affairs
- Suella Braverman, Secretary of State for the Home Department
- Ben Wallace, Secretary of State for Defence
- Grant Shapps, Secretary of State for Energy Security and Net Zero
- Michelle Donelan, Secretary of State for Science, Innovation and Technology
- Michael Gove, Secretary of State for Levelling Up, Housing and Communities
- Chloe Smith, Secretary of State for Science, Innovation and Technology (maternity cover)
- Steve Barclay, Secretary of State for Health and Social Care
- Kemi Badenoch, Secretary of State for Business and Trade
- Thérèse Coffey, Secretary of State for Environment, Food and Rural Affairs
- Mel Stride, Secretary of State for Work and Pensions
- Gillian Keegan, Secretary of State for Education
- Mark Harper, Secretary of State for Transport
- Lucy Frazer, Secretary of State for Culture, Media and Sport
- Gregory Hands, Minister without Portfolio at the Cabinet Office
- Chris Heaton-Harris, Secretary of State for Northern Ireland
- Alister Jack, Secretary of State for Scotland
- David TC Davies, Secretary of State for Wales
- Simon Hart, Chief Whip and Parliamentary Secretary to the Treasury
- John Glen, Chief Secretary to the Treasury

=== Other Government Ministers in the House of Commons ===
- Robert Jenrick, Minister of State for Immigration
- Victoria Prentis, His Majesty's Attorney General for England and Wales
- Jeremy Quin, Paymaster General and Minister for the Cabinet Office
- Tom Tugendhat, Minister of State for Security
- Andrew Mitchell, Minister of State for Development and Africa
- Johnny Mercer, Minister of State for Veterans' Affairs

=== Leaders of other UK political parties ===
- Sir Keir Starmer, Leader of His Majesty's Loyal Opposition and Leader of the Labour Party
- Sir Ed Davey, Leader of the Liberal Democrats
- Sir Jeffrey Donaldson, Leader of the Democratic Unionist Party
- Stephen Flynn, Leader of the Scottish National Party in the House of Commons

=== Members of Parliament ===
- Sir Lindsay Hoyle, Speaker of the House of Commons and MP for Chorley
- Nigel Adams, MP for Selby and Ainsty
- Stuart Andrew, MP for Pudsey and Parliamentary Under-Secretary of State for Sport, Tourism and Civil Society
- Steve Baker, MP for Wycombe and Minister of State for Northern Ireland
- Simon Baynes, MP for Clwyd South
- Ian Blackford, MP for Ross, Skye and Lochaber
- Sir Graham Brady, MP for Altrincham and Sale West and Chairman of the 1922 Committee
- Sir Conor Burns, MP for Bournemouth West
- Alan Campbell, MP for Tynemouth and Labour Party Chief Whip
- Andy Carter, MP for Warrington South
- Ashley Dalton, MP for West Lancashire
- Samantha Dixon, MP for City of Chester
- Julie Elliott, MP for Sunderland Central
- Sir Michael Ellis, MP for Northampton North
- Chris Elmore, MP for Ogmore
- Laura Farris, MP for West Berkshire
- Sir Roger Gale, MP for North Thanet and Deputy Speaker of the House of Commons
- Sarah Green, MP for Chesham and Amersham
- Andrew Gwynne, MP for Denton and Reddish and Shadow Minister for Public Health
- Harriet Harman, MP for Camberwell and Peckham and Mother of the House
- Simon Hoare, MP for North Dorset
- Richard Holden, MP for North West Durham
- Nigel Huddleston, MP for Mid Worcestershire and Minister of State for International Trade
- Fay Jones, MP for and Brecon and Radnorshire Assistant Government Whip
- Sarah Jones, MP for Croydon Central and Shadow Minister for Policing and the Fire Service
- Barbara Keeley, MP for Worsley and Eccles South and Shadow Minister for Arts and Civil Society
- Dame Andrea Leadsom, MP for South Northamptonshire
- Jerome Mayhew, MP for Broadland
- Jim McMahon, MP for Oldham West and Royton and Shadow Secretary of State for Environment, Food and Rural Affairs
- Angus Brendan MacNeil, MP for Na h-Eileanan an Iar
- Carol Monaghan, MP for Glasgow North West
- Joy Morrissey, MP for Beaconsfield and Assistant Government Whip
- Caroline Nokes, MP for Romsey and Southampton North
- Brendan O'Hara, MP for Argyll and Bute
- John Penrose, MP for Weston-super-Mare
- Andrew Percy, MP for Brigg and Goole
- Virendra Sharma, MP for Ealing Southall
- Barry Sheerman, MP for Huddersfield
- Tanmanjeet Singh Dhesi, MP for Slough and Shadow Exchequer Secretary to the Treasury
- Cat Smith, MP for Lancaster and Fleetwood
- Julian Smith, MP for Skipton and Ripon
- Mark Spencer, MP for Sherwood and Minister of State for Food, Farming and Fisheries
- Wes Streeting, MP for Ilford North and Shadow Secretary of State for Health and Social Care
- Kelly Tolhurst, MP for Rochester and Strood
- Laura Trott, MP for Sevenoaks and Parliamentary Under-Secretary of State for Pensions
- Sir Charles Walker, MP for Broxbourne
- Giles Watling, MP for Clacton
- Catherine West, MP for Hornsey and Wood Green and Shadow Minister for Asia and the Pacific
- Helen Whately, MP for Faversham and Mid Kent and Minister of State for Social Care
- Craig Williams, MP for Montgomeryshire and Parliamentary Private Secretary to the Prime Minister
- Sir Gavin Williamson, MP for South Staffordshire
- Jacob Young, MP for Redcar and Assistant Government Whip

=== First ministers of devolved governments ===
- Humza Yousaf, First Minister of Scotland and Keeper of the Great Seal of Scotland, and his wife, Cllr Nadia El-Nakla
- Mark Drakeford, First Minister of Wales and Keeper of the Welsh Seal, and his sister-in-law, Penelope Saitch
- Michelle O'Neill, First Minister-designate of Northern Ireland

=== Leaders of other political parties in devolved countries ===
- Jim Allister, Leader of the Traditional Unionist Voice
- Doug Beattie, Leader of the Ulster Unionist Party
- Alex Cole-Hamilton, Leader of the Scottish Liberal Democrats
- Colum Eastwood, Leader of the Social Democratic and Labour Party
- Naomi Long, Leader of the Alliance Party
- Douglas Ross, Leader of the Scottish Conservative and Unionist Party
- Anas Sarwar, Leader of the Scottish Labour Party
- Andrew R. T. Davies, Leader of the Welsh Conservative Party

=== Members of devolved parliaments ===
- Alison Johnstone, Presiding Officer of the Scottish Parliament
- Alex Maskey, Speaker of the Northern Ireland Assembly
- David Rees, Deputy Presiding Officer of the Senedd
- Mick Antoniw, MS for Pontypridd and Counsel General for Wales

=== Other peers of the realm ===
- The Duke of Argyll
- The Duke of Buccleuch and Queensberry, carrying the Sceptre with Cross, and Lord Lieutenant of Roxburgh, Ettrick and Lauderdale
- The Duke of Devonshire
- The Duke of Hamilton and Brandon
- The Duke and Duchess of Northumberland, Lord Lieutenant of Northumberland
- The Duke of Wellington, carrying Queen Mary's Crown
- The Duke of Westminster, the King's godson, carrying the standard of the Royal Arms of England
- The Marquess of Anglesey, carrying the standard of the Principality of Wales
- The Marquess and Marchioness of Cholmondeley, Lord-in-Waiting and former Lord Great Chamberlain of England and his wife
  - Lord Oliver Cholmondeley (page of honour to the King)
- The Marquess of Huntly
- The Marquess of Lansdowne
- The Marquess and Marchioness of Salisbury
- The Earl and Countess of Antrim
- The Earl of Derby, Vice Admiral of Lancashire
- The Earl of Loudoun, bearing the Golden Spurs
- The Earl of Dalhousie, Deputy Captain General of the King's Body Guard for Scotland
- The Earl and Countess of Airlie, former Lord Chamberlain and his wife, a former Lady-in-Waiting to Queen Elizabeth II
  - Lord Ogilvy
- The Earl of Dundee, bearer of the Royal Banner of Scotland
- The Earl of Courtown, Captain of the Yeomen of the Guard
- The Earl of Caledon, carrying the Standard of the Royal Arms of Northern Ireland, and Lord Lieutenant of County Armagh, and Countess of Caledon
- The Earl Howe, Deputy Leader of the House of Lords, and Countess Howe, Lord Lieutenant of Buckinghamshire
- The Earl of Kilmorey, former Minister of State for Trade
- The Earl of Kinnoull, Convenor of the Crossbench Peers
- The Earl and Countess Peel, former Lord Chamberlain and his wife
- The Earl and Countess of Rosslyn, Lord Steward of the Royal Household and his wife
- The Earl and Countess of Halifax
- The Viscount Brookeborough, Lord Lieutenant of County Fermanagh
- The Viscount Colville of Culross
- The Viscount Hereford
- The Viscount Thurso, Lord Lieutenant of Caithness
- The Lord Hastings, bearing the Golden Spurs
- The Lord de Mauley, Master of the Horse
- The Lord and Lady Cavendish of Furness, former Lord-in-Waiting and his wife
- The Lord Hope of Craighead, representing the Most Ancient and Most Noble Order of the Thistle
- The Lord Eames, representing the Order of Merit
- The Lord and Lady Lloyd-Webber, composer of the coronation anthem "Make a Joyful Noise" and his wife
- The Baroness Amos, participating in the act of recognition of His Majesty
- The Baroness Kennedy of The Shaws, carrying The Queen's rod
- The Lord Patel, presenting the ring
- The Baroness Ashton of Upholland, representing the Most Distinguished Order of St Michael and St George
- The Lord Coe, representing the Order of Companions of Honour
- The Lord Darzi of Denham, carrying the armills
- The Baroness Manningham-Buller, carrying St Edward's staff
- The Baroness Benjamin, carrying the sceptre with the dove
- The Lord Singh of Wimbledon, presenting the coronation glove
- The Baroness Williams of Trafford, captain of the Honourable Corps of Gentlemen-at-Arms
- General The Lord Richards of Herstmonceux, carrying the Sword of Spiritual Justice
- The Lord Chartres, carrying the Queen's ring and presenting The Queen's sceptre with cross
- General The Lord Houghton of Richmond, carrying the Sword of Temporal Justice
- The Lord Kamall, presenting the Armills
- The Baroness Merron, presenting the Robe Royal
- The Lord Parker of Minsmere, Lord Chamberlain
- The Lord Peach, carrying the Sword of Mercy
- The Lord McFall of Alcluith, Lord Speaker
- The Lord Gardiner of Kimble, Senior Deputy Speaker of the House of Lords
- The Baroness Fookes, Deputy Speaker of the House of Lords
- The Lord Haskel, Deputy Speaker of the House of Lords
- The Lord Rogan, Deputy Speaker of the House of Lords and Leader of the Ulster Unionist Party in the House of Lords
- The Baroness Smith of Basildon, Leader of the Opposition in the House of Lords
- The Lord Newby, Leader of the Liberal Democrats in the House of Lords
- The Lord Dodds of Duncairn, Leader of the Democratic Unionist Party in the House of Lords
- The Lord Ahmad of Wimbledon, Minister of State for the Middle East, North Africa, South Asia and the United Nations
- The Lord Stewart of Dirleton, His Majesty's Advocate General for Scotland
- The Baroness Vere of Norbiton, Parliamentary Under-Secretary of State for Aviation, Maritime and Security
- The Baroness Bloomfield of Hinton Waldrist, Baroness-in-Waiting
- The Lord Caine, Lord-in-Waiting
- The Lord Davies of Gower, Lord-in-Waiting
- The Lord Evans of Rainow, Lord-in-Waiting
- The Lord Harlech, Lord-in-Waiting
- The Lord Reed of Allermuir, President of the Supreme Court
- The Lord Burnett of Maldon, Lord Chief Justice of England and Wales
- The Lord Addington
- The Lord Anderson of Ipswich
- The Lord Astor of Hever
- The Lord and Lady Bamford
- The Baroness Barran
- The Lord Blencathra
- The Lord Boateng
- The Baroness Bull
- The Lord Butler of Brockwell, former Cabinet Secretary
- The Lord Carey of Clifton, former Archbishop of Canterbury
- The Lord Collins of Highbury, Shadow Deputy Leader of the House of Lords
- The Baroness Crawley
- The Lord Darling of Roulanish, former Chancellor of the Exchequer
- The Lord Davies of Brixton
- The Lord Dholakia
- The Baroness Drake
- The Lord Elis-Thomas, former Presiding Officer of the National Assembly for Wales
- The Baroness Evans of Bowes Park, former Leader of the House of Lords
- The Lord Faulks
- The Lord Forsyth of Drumlean, Chairman of the Association of Conservative Peers
- The Lord Gadhia
- The Baroness Grey-Thompson
- The Baroness Harding of Winscombe
- The Baroness Hayman, former Lord Speaker
- The Baroness Hayter of Kentish Town, former Shadow Deputy Leader of the House of Lords
- The Lord Hendy
- The Lord Henley
- The Lord Hintze
- The Baroness Hoey
- The Baroness Hollins
- The Lord Hope of Thornes, former Archbishop of York
- The Lord Howard of Rising
- The Lord Janvrin, former Private Secretary to Queen Elizabeth II
- The Lord Kennedy of Southwark, Labour Chief Whip in the House of Lords
- The Baroness Lawrence of Clarendon
- The Lord Luce, former Lord Chamberlain
- The Lord Mandelson
- The Lord McDonald of Salford
- The Lord McInnes of Kilwinning
- The Lord McNally, former Leader of the Liberal Democrats in the House of Lords
- The Lord Morris of Aberavon, former Attorney General for England and Wales
- The Lord Mowbray, Segrave and Stourton
- The Lord Murphy of Torfaen, former Secretary of State for Wales
- The Baroness Nicholson of Winterbourne
- The Baroness Parminter, Deputy Leader of the Liberal Democrats in the House of Lords
- The Lord Robathan
- The Baroness Rock
- The Lord Rothschild
- The Baroness Royall of Blaisdon
- The Baroness Scotland of Asthal, Secretary General of the Commonwealth, and Richard Mawhinney
- The Lord Sentamu, former Archbishop of York
- The Lord Sinclair, Lord Lieutenant of Kirkcudbright
- The Lord Soames of Fletching
- Marshal of the Royal Air Force the Lord Stirrup, former Chief of the Defence Staff
- The Lord Stoneham of Droxford, Chief Whip of the Liberal Democrats in the House of Lords
- The Baroness Stuart of Edgbaston
- The Lord Thomas of Gresford
- The Lord Touhig
- The Baroness Tyler of Enfield
- The Baroness Vere of Norbiton, Parliamentary Under-Secretary of State for Aviation, Maritime and Security
- The Baroness Walmsley, Co-Deputy Leader of the Liberal Democrats in the House of Lords
- The Lord Warner, former Minister of State for National Health Services Delivery
- The Baroness Wheeler
- The Lord Williams of Oystermouth, former Archbishop of Canterbury
- The Lord Woolley of Woodford
- The Baroness Wyld

=== Other politicians ===
- Cllr Hamza Taouzzale, Lord Mayor of Westminster
- Alderman Nicholas Lyons, Lord Mayor of London
- Sadiq Khan, Mayor of London
- Dan Norris, Mayor of the West of England
- Andy Street, Mayor of the West Midlands
- Tracy Brabin, Mayor of West Yorkshire
- Ben Houchen, Mayor of the Tees Valley
- Oliver Coppard, Mayor of South Yorkshire
- Andy Burnham, Mayor of Greater Manchester
- Cllr David Cameron, Lord Provost and Lord Lieutenant of Aberdeen
- Cllr Bill Campbell, Lord Provost and Lord Lieutenant of Dundee
- Cllr Robert Aldridge, Lord Provost and Lord Lieutenant of Edinburgh
- Cllr Jacqueline McLaren, Lord Provost and Lord Lieutenant of Glasgow
- Cllr Andrew Morgan, Leader of the Welsh Local Government Association

=== Other judiciary ===
==== England and Wales ====
- Sir Geoffrey Vos, Master of the Rolls
- Dame Victoria Sharpe, President of the King's Bench
- Sir Timothy Holroyde (Lord Justice Holroyde), Lord Justice of Appeal
- Sir Peter Jackson (Lord Justice Jackson), Lord Justice of Appeal
- Sir Christopher Nugee (Lord Justice Nugee), Lord Justice of Appeal

==== Northern Ireland ====
- Dame Siobhan Keegan, Lord Chief Justice of Northern Ireland

==== Scotland ====
- Lord Carloway, Lord President of the Court of Session Lord Justice General
- Lady Dorrian, Lord Justice Clerk
- Lord Mulholland, Senator of the College of Justice and former Lord Advocate

=== Other Privy Counsellors ===
- Lady Arden of Heswall, former Justice of the Supreme Court
- Dame Margaret Beckett, former Secretary of State for Foreign and Commonwealth Affairs
- Lord Bonomy, former Senator of the College of Justice
- Lord Bracadale, former Senator of the College of Justice
- Lord Carnwath of Notting Hill, former Justice of the Supreme Court
- Simon Case, Cabinet Secretary and Head of the Home Civil Service
- Sir Nick Clegg, former Deputy Prime Minister
- Ann Clwyd, former Chair of the Parliamentary Labour Party
- Nadine Dorries, former Secretary of State for Digital, Culture, Media and Sport
- Sir Patrick Elias, former Lord Justice of Appeal
- Sir Maurice Kay, former Lord Justice of Appeal
- Sir David Keene, former Lord Justice of Appeal
- Sir David Lidington, former Chancellor of the Duchy of Lancaster
- Sir Timothy Lloyd, former Lord Justice of Appeal
- Sir Andrew Longmore, former Lord Justice of Appeal
- Sir Declan Morgan, former Lord Chief Justice of Northern Ireland
- Sir Philip Otton, former Lord Justice of Appeal
- Sir George Reid, former Presiding Officer of the Scottish Parliament
- Rory Stewart, former Secretary of State for International Development, and his wife Shoshana Clark

=== Civil servants ===
- Simon Burton, Clerk of the Parliaments
- Sir John Benger, Clerk of the House of Commons
- Antonia Romeo, Clerk of the Crown in Chancery in Great Britain
- Thomas Callagher, Head of Strategy and Protocol Team, Cabinet Office
- Richard Tilbrook, Clerk of the Privy Council
- Susanna McGibbon, His Majesty's Procurator General and Solicitor for the Affairs of His Majesty's Treasury
- David Williams, Permanent Secretary of the Ministry of Defence
- Sir Chris Wormald, Permanent Secretary of the Department of Health
- Tamara Finkelstein, Permanent Secretary of the Department of the Environment, Food and Rural Affairs
- Andrew Bailey, Governor of the Bank of England
- Sir Chris Whitty, Chief Medical Officer for England
- Jayne Brady, Head of the Northern Ireland Civil Service
- Lesley Hogg, Chief Executive of the Northern Ireland Assembly
- Dorothy Bain, His Majesty's Lord Advocate
- David McGill, Chief Executive of the Scottish Parliament
- John-Paul Marks, Permanent Secretary, Scottish Government
- Sir Gregor Smith, Chief Medical Officer, Scottish Government
- Jason Leitch, National Clinical Director, Scottish Government
- Alyson Stafford, Director General, Scottish Exchequer, Scottish Government
- Elaine Lorimer, Chief Executive, Revenue Scotland, Scottish Government
- Professor Graeme Roy, Chair, Scottish Fiscal Commission, Scottish Government
- Teresa Medhurst, Chief Executive, Scottish Prison Service
- James Hynd, Head of Cabinet, Parliament and Governance, Scottish Government
- Mark Dennis, former Ross Herald of Arms Extraordinary, Court of the Lord Lyon
- Susan Felstead, Scottish Government
- Dr Andrew Goodall, Permanent Secretary, Welsh Government
- Dr Manon Antoniazzi, Clerk to the Senedd
- Judith Paget, Chief Executive Officer of NHS Wales

=== Lord Lieutenants ===
- Edmund Anderson, Lord Lieutenant of West Yorkshire
- George Asher, Lord Lieutenant of Nairn
- Brigadier Robert Aitken, Lord Lieutenant of Gwent
- Nigel Atkinson, Lord Lieutenant of Hampshire
- Robert Balfour, Lord Lieutenant of Fife
- Edmund Bailey, Lord Lieutenant of Gwynedd
- Lady Emma Barnard, Lord Lieutenant of West Sussex
- Andrew Blackman, Lord Lieutenant of East Sussex
- Colonel Edward Bolitho, Lord Lieutenant of Cornwall
- Aileen Brewis, Lord Lieutenant of Wigtown
- Lieutenant Colonel Richard Callander, Lord Lieutenant of Midlothian
- Angus Campbell, Lord Lieutenant of Dorset
- Dame Hilary Chapman, Lord Lieutenant of West Yorkshire
- The Lady Colgrain, Lord Lieutenant of Kent
- Timothy Cox, Lord Lieutenant of Warwickshire
- Sir John Crabtree, Lord Lieutenant of West Midlands
- Ian Crowe, Lord Lieutenant of the County Borough of Londonderry
- The Lady Dannatt, Lord Lieutenant of Norfolk
- Roger Deeks, Vice Lord Lieutenant of Gloucestershire
- Toby Dennis, Lord Lieutenant of Lincolnshire
- James Dick, Lord Lieutenant of the East Riding of Yorkshire
- Ian Dudson, Lord Lieutenant of Staffordshire
- Sara Edwards, Lord Lieutenant of Dyfed
- Henry Fetherstonhaugh, Lord Lieutenant of Clwyd
- Louise Fleet, Lord Lieutenant of West Glamorgan
- Elizabeth Fothergill, Lord Lieutenant of Derbyshire
- Dr Sarah Furness, Lord Lieutenant of Rutland
- David Fursdon, Lord Lieutenant of Devon
- Marjorie Glasgow, Lord Lieutenant of Oxfordshire
- Peaches Golding, Lord Lieutenant of the City and County of Bristol
- Beatrice Grant, Lord Lieutenant of Worcestershire
- Elaine Grieve, Lord Lieutenant of Orkney
- Edward Harley, Lord Lieutenant of Herefordshire
- The Lady Haughey, Lord Lieutenant of Lanarkshire
- Diane Hawkins, Lord Lieutenant of Greater Manchester
- Claire Hensman, Lord Lieutenant of Cumbria
- Bobby Hunter, Lord Lieutenant of Shetland
- Tia Jones, Lord Lieutenant of Powys
- Michael Kapur, Lord Lieutenant of Leicestershire
- Stephen Leckie, Lord Lieutenant of Perth and Kinross
- Dr Alan Logan, Lord Lieutenant of the County Borough of Belfast
- Susan Lousada, Lord Lieutenant of Bedfordshire
- Iain Macaulay, Lord Lieutenant of the Western Isles
- Colonel Peter McCarthy, Lord Lieutenant of Renfrewshire
- David McCorkell, Lord Lieutenant of County Antrim
- Sheriff Iona McDonald, Lord Lieutenant of Ayrshire and Arran
- Lady MacGregor, Lord Lieutenant of Dumfries
- Jane MacLeod, Lord Lieutenant of Argyll and Bute
- Alastair Macphie, Lord Lieutenant of Kincardineshire
- Alexander Manson, Lord Lieutenant of Aberdeenshire
- Major General Patrick Marriott, Lord Lieutenant of Sutherland
- Morfudd Meredith, Lord Lieutenant of South Glamorgan
- Alison Millar, Lord Lieutenant of County Londonderry
- Major General The Hon Seymour Monro, Lord Lieutenant of Moray
- Michael More-Molyneux, Lord Lieutenant of Surrey
- Robert Owen, Vice Lord Lieutenant of Merseyside
- Sir John Peace, Lord Lieutenant of Nottinghamshire
- James Puxley, Lord Lieutenant of Berkshire
- Lady Redmond, Lord Lieutenant of Cheshire
- Johanna Ropner, Lord Lieutenant of North Yorkshire
- Robert Rous, Vice Lord Lieutenant of Suffolk
- Gawn Rowan Hamilton, Lord Lieutenant of County Down
- Mohammed Saddiq, Lord Lieutenant of Somerset
- James Saunders Watson, Lord Lieutenant of Northamptonshire
- Robert Scott, Lord Lieutenant of County Tyrone
- Susie Sheldon, Lord Lieutenant of the Isle of Wight
- Alan Simpson, Lord Lieutenant of Stirling and Falkirk
- Andrew Simpson, Lord Lieutenant of Banffshire
- Susan Snowdon, Lord Lieutenant of County Durham
- Julie Spence, Lord Lieutenant of Cambridgeshire
- Lieutenant Colonel John Stewart, Lord Lieutenant of Clackmannanshire
- Professor Sir Hew Strachan, Lord Lieutenant of Tweeddale
- Jeanna Swan, Lord Lieutenant of Berwickshire
- Malcolm Taylor, Vice Lord Lieutenant of Angus
- Jennifer Tolhurst, Lord Lieutenant of Essex
- Andrew Try, Lord Lieutenant of Berkshire
- Anna Turner, Lord Lieutenant of Shropshire
- Roderick Urquhart, Lord Lieutenant of East Lothian
- Peter Vaughan, Lord Lieutenant of Mid Glamorgan
- Robert Voss, Lord Lieutenant of Hertfordshire
- Joanie Whiteford, Lord Lieutenant of Ross and Cromarty
- James Wotherspoon, Lord Lieutenant of Inverness
- Lucy Winskell, Lord Lieutenant of Tyne and Wear
- Jill Young, Lord Lieutenant of Dunbartonshire

=== Armed Forces ===
- General Gwyn Jenkins, Vice-Chief of the Defence Staff
- Admiral Sir Ben Key, First Sea Lord and Chief of the Naval Staff
- General Sir Patrick Sanders, Chief of the General Staff, carrying the Queen's sceptre
- Air Chief Marshal Sir Michael Wigston, Chief of the Air Staff
- General Sir Adrian Bradshaw, Governor of the Royal Hospital Chelsea
- Lance-Corporal of Horse Christopher Finney, chair of the Victoria Cross and George Cross Association
- Petty Officer Amy Taylor, bearing the Jewelled Sword of Offering

Cadet Forces

- Cadet Warrant Officer Elliott Tyson-Lee, bearing the Union Flag

=== Emergency Services ===
- Sir Mark Rowley, Commissioner of the Metropolitan Police
- Lucy D'Orsi, Chief Constable of British Transport Police
- Sir lain Livingstone, Chief Constable, Police Scotland
- Ross Haqqart, Chief Fire Officer, Fire Scotland
- Pauline Howie, Chief Executive, Scottish Ambulance Service
- Dr Richard Lewis, Chief Constable, Dyfed Powys Police
- Dawn Docx, Chief Fire Officer, North Wales Fire and Rescue Service
- Jason Killens, Chief Executive, Welsh Ambulance Service Trust

=== Orders of chivalry and gallantry award holders ===
Some representatives are listed elsewhere.

- Sir Andrew Ford, Royal Victorian Order
- Mark Compton, Order of St John
- Sir Gary Hickinbottom, Knights Bachelor
- Dame Susan Ion, Order of the British Empire
- Sir Stephen Dalton, Order of the Bath
- Lady Mary Peters, Order of the Garter
- Dominic Troulan, George Cross

=== Crown Dependencies ===
- Richard Cripwell, Lieutenant Governor of Guernsey
  - Richard McMahon, Bailiff of Guernsey
- Vice Admiral Jeremy Kyd, Lieutenant Governor of Jersey
  - Sir Timothy Le Cocq, Bailiff of Jersey
- Sir John Lorimer, Lieutenant Governor of the Isle of Man
  - Alfred Cannan, Chief Minister of the Isle of Man

=== British Overseas Territories ===
- Dileeni Daniel-Selvaratnam, Governor of Anguilla
  - Ellis Webster, Premier of Anguilla
- Paul Candler, Commissioner for the British Antarctic Territory and the British Indian Ocean Territory
- Rena Lalgie, Governor of Bermuda
  - Edward David Burt, Premier of Bermuda
- Jane Owen, Governor of the Cayman Islands
  - Wayne Panton, Premier of the Cayman Islands
- Alison Blake, Governor of the Falkland Islands and Commissioner of South Georgia and the South Sandwich Islands
  - Teslyn Barkman, Member of the Legislative Assembly of the Falkland Islands
- Sir David Steel, Governor of Gibraltar
  - Fabian Picardo, Chief Minister of Gibraltar
- Sarah Tucker, Governor of Montserrat
  - Easton Taylor-Farrell, Premier of Montserrat
- Iona Thomas, Governor of Pitcairn
  - Simon Young, Mayor of Pitcairn
- Nigel Phillips, Governor of Saint Helena, Ascension and Tristan da Cunha
  - Julie Thomas, Chief Minister of Saint Helena
  - James Glass, Chief Islander of Tristan da Cunha
- Anya Williams, Deputy Governor of the Turks and Caicos Islands
  - Charles Washington Misick, Premier of the Turks and Caicos Islands
- John Rankin, Governor of the British Virgin Islands
  - Natalio Wheatley, Premier and Finance Minister of the British Virgin Islands

== Other Commonwealth realms ==
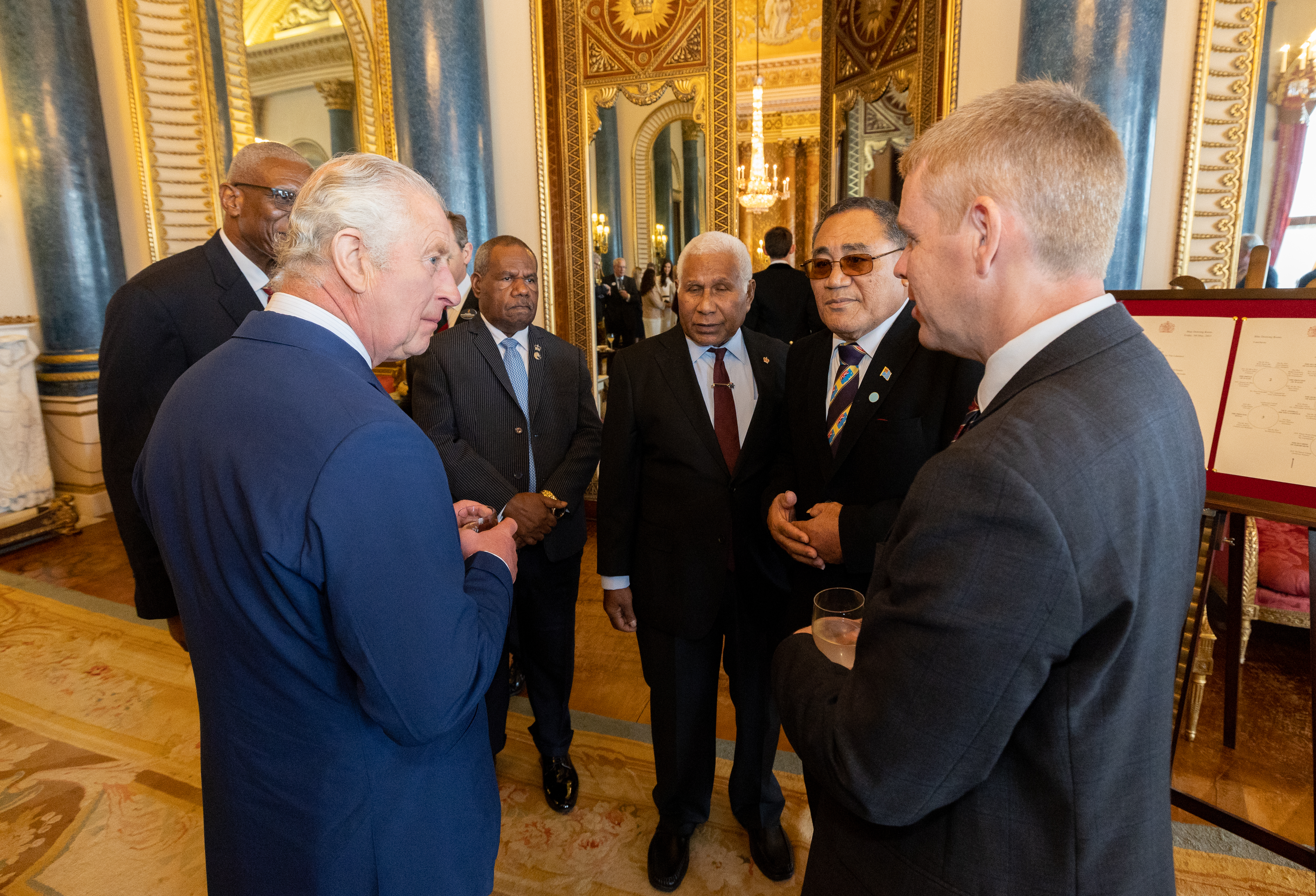
All fourteen governors-general and eight other realm prime ministers (pictured, left to right: Sir Rodney Williams, Sir Bob Dadae, Sir David Vunagi, Sir Tofiga Vaevalu Falani and Chris Hipkins) attended the coronation.

=== Antigua and Barbuda ===
- Sir Rodney Williams, Governor-General of Antigua and Barbuda, and Lady Sandra Williams
- Gaston Browne, Prime Minister of Antigua and Barbuda, and Maria Bird-Browne
- Karen-Mae Hill, High Commissioner of Antigua and Barbuda to the United Kingdom
- Paula Frederick-Hunte, permanent secretary in the Office of the Governor-General
- Atlee Rodney, Commissioner of Police of the Royal Police Force of Antigua and Barbuda
- Dale Mercury, aide-de-camp to the Governor-General and Assistant Superintendent of Police
- Ickford Roberts, accountant general
- Laurie Freeland Roberts, registrar in the Civil Registry
- Bernard Warner, field officer at the Rehabilitation Centre for Persons with Disabilities
- Kiz Johnson, senator, bearing the flag of Antigua and Barbuda

=== Australia ===
- General David Hurley, Governor-General of Australia, and Linda Hurley
- Anthony Albanese, Prime Minister of Australia, and Jodie Haydon
- Stephen Smith, High Commissioner of Australia to the United Kingdom, and Jane Seymour
- Margaret Beazley, Governor of New South Wales
- Linda Dessau, Governor of Victoria
- Jeannette Young, Governor of Queensland
- Christopher Dawson, Governor of Western Australia
- Frances Adamson, Governor of South Australia
- Barbara Baker, Governor of Tasmania
- Julie Bishop, Chair of the Prince's Trust Australia and former Minister for Foreign Affairs
- Leanne Benjamin, principal ballet dancer for the Royal Ballet for 21 years
- Nicholas Cave, singer, songwriter, actor, novelist and screenwriter
- Jasmine Coe, artist and the creator and curator of Coe Gallery
- Adam Hills, comedian, presenter, writer and disability rights advocate
- Daniel Nour, founder of Street Side Medics
- Yasmin Poole, public speaker, board director and youth advocate
- Emily Regan, London-based nurse who worked for the NHS
- Minette Salmon, studying a PhD in Genomic Medicine and Statistics
- Claire Spencer, arts leader and the inaugural CEO of the Barbican Centre
- Merryn Voysey, Associate Professor of Statistics in Vaccinology at the Oxford Vaccine Group
- Corporal Daniel Keighran, recipient of the Victoria Cross for Australia
- Corporal Mark Donaldson, recipient of the Victoria Cross for Australia
- Warrant Officer Class Two Keith Payne, recipient of the Victoria Cross
- Richard Joyes, recipient of the Australian Cross of Valour
- Yvonne Kenny, soprano
- Samantha Kerr, football player, bearing the flag of Australia

=== The Bahamas ===
- Sir Cornelius A. Smith, Governor-General of The Bahamas, and Lady Smith
  - Dame Marguerite Pindling, former Governor-General of The Bahamas
- Philip Davis, Prime Minister of The Bahamas, and Ann Marie Davis
  - Hubert Ingraham, former Prime Minister of The Bahamas (1992–2002; 2007–2012)
  - Perry Christie, former Prime Minister of The Bahamas (2002–2005; 2005–2007; 2012–2017)
  - Hubert Minnis, former Prime Minister of The Bahamas (2017–2021)
- Paul Andy Gomez, High Commissioner of The Bahamas to the United Kingdom
- Michael Pintard, Leader of the Opposition, and Berlice Pintard

=== Belize ===
- Dame Froyla Tzalam, Governor-General of Belize, and Daniel Mendez
- Francis Fonseca, Minister of Education, Culture, Science and Technology
- Stuart Leslie, Cabinet Secretary
- Therese Rath, High Commissioner of Belize to the United Kingdom, and Anthony Rath
- Cameron Gegg, finance professional, bearing the flag of Belize

=== Canada ===
- Mary Simon, Governor General of Canada, and Whit Fraser
- Justin Trudeau, Prime Minister of Canada, and Sophie Grégoire Trudeau
- Ralph Goodale, Canadian High Commissioner to the United Kingdom, and Pamela Kendel Goodale
- Janice Charette, Clerk to the Privy Council of Canada and Secretary to the Cabinet
- RoseAnne Archibald, National Chief of the Assembly of First Nations
- Natan Obed, President of the Inuit Tapiriit Kanatami
- Cassidy Caron, President of the Métis National Council
- Sarah Mazhero, member of the Prime Minister's Youth Council
- Christina Caouette, CEO of Young Diplomats of Canada
- Rebeccah Raphael, founder of Halifax Helpers
- Marguerite Tölgyesi, President of the French-Canadian Youth Federation
- Maryam Tsegaye, winner of the Breakthrough Junior Challenge
- Jennifer Sidey-Gibbons, Canadian Space Agency astronaut
- Margaret MacMillan, member of the Order of Merit and companion of the Order of Canada
- Leslie Arthur Palmer, recipient of the Cross of Valour
- Colonel Jeremy Hansen, Canadian Space Agency astronaut, bearing the flag of Canada

=== Grenada ===
- Dame Cécile La Grenade, Governor-General of Grenada
- Dickon Mitchell, Prime Minister of Grenada
- Kisha Abba Grant, High Commissioner for Grenada to the United Kingdom
- Sergeant Major Johnson Beharry, Victoria Cross recipient
- Afy Fletcher, athlete
- Lindon Victor, athlete
- Lance Sergeant Chen Charles, bearing the flag of Grenada

=== Jamaica ===
- Sir Patrick Allen, Governor-General of Jamaica, and Lady Allen
- Patrice Laird Brown, Acting High Commissioner for Jamaica to the United Kingdom
- David Salmon, 2023 Rhodes scholar, bearing the flag of Jamaica

=== New Zealand ===
- Dame Cindy Kiro, Governor-General of New Zealand, and Richard Davies
- Chris Hipkins, Prime Minister of New Zealand
- Phil Goff, New Zealand High Commissioner to the United Kingdom, and Mary Goff
- Christopher Luxon, Leader of the Opposition
- Sir Tom Marsters, King's Representative in the Cook Islands, and Lady Marsters
- Richie McCaw, Order of New Zealand representative
- Willie Apiata, Victoria Cross for New Zealand representative
- Abdul Aziz, New Zealand Cross representative
- Dame Naida Glavish and Lorraine Toki
- Ben Appleton, kaiāwhina and director of Ngāti Rānana
- Sarah Smart, UK general manager of The Dairy Collective
- Craig Fenton, 2023 UK New Zealander of the Year
- Rebecca Scown, former Olympic rower and CEO of Youth Experience in Sport
- Rhieve Grey, graduate student and 2021 Rhodes scholar
- Sergeant Hayden Smith, bearing the flag of New Zealand

=== Papua New Guinea ===
- Sir Bob Dadae, Governor-General of Papua New Guinea, and Lady Dadae
- Justin Tkatchenko, Minister for Foreign Affairs (representing Prime Minister James Marape)
  - Savannah Tkatchenko, daughter of the Minister of Foreign Affairs
- Koni Iguan, Deputy Speaker of the National Parliament of Papua New Guinea
- Rainbo Paita, Minister for Finance and National Planning
- Taies Sansan, secretary for the Department of Personnel Management
- Gisuwat Mangere Siniwin, former Vice Minister of Education and MP for Nawae
- Noel Leana, acting Chief of State Protocol, bearing the flag of Papua New Guinea

=== Saint Kitts and Nevis ===
- Dame Marcella Liburd, Governor-General of Saint Kitts and Nevis
- Terrance Drew, Prime Minister of Saint Kitts and Nevis
- Hyleta Liburd, Deputy Governor-General for Nevis
- Mark Brantley, Premier of Nevis
- Denzil Douglas, Minister of Foreign Affairs and former Prime Minister of Saint Kitts and Nevis
- Naeemah Hazelle, permanent secretary in the Prime Minister's Office
- Christine Walwyn, diaspora ambassador
- Thouvia France, protocol foreign service officer in the Ministry of Foreign Affairs

=== Saint Lucia ===
- Errol Charles, acting Governor-General of Saint Lucia

=== Saint Vincent and the Grenadines ===
- Dame Susan Dougan, Governor-General of Saint Vincent and the Grenadines, and Hugh Dougan
- Ralph Gonsalves, Prime Minister of Saint Vincent and the Grenadines, and Eloise Gonsalves
- Sub-Lieutenant Adaiah Providence-Culzac, bearing the flag of Saint Vincent and the Grenadines

=== Solomon Islands ===
- Sir David Vunagi, Governor-General of Solomon Islands, and Lady Vunagi
- Moses Kouni Mose, High Commissioner for Solomon Islands to the United Kingdom
- Jeremiah Manele, Minister of Foreign Affairs and External Trade

=== Tuvalu ===
- Sir Tofiga Vaevalu Falani, Governor-General of Tuvalu

== Other Commonwealth countries ==
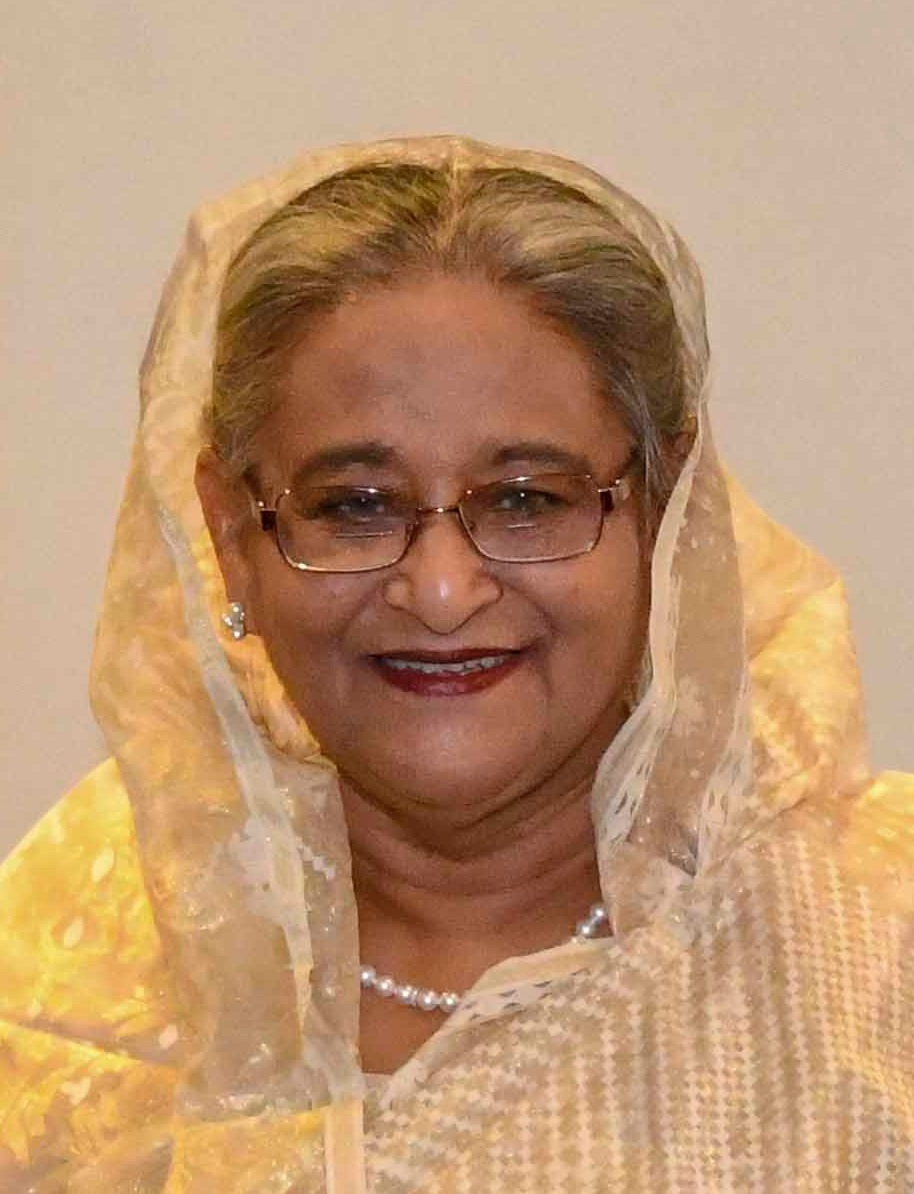
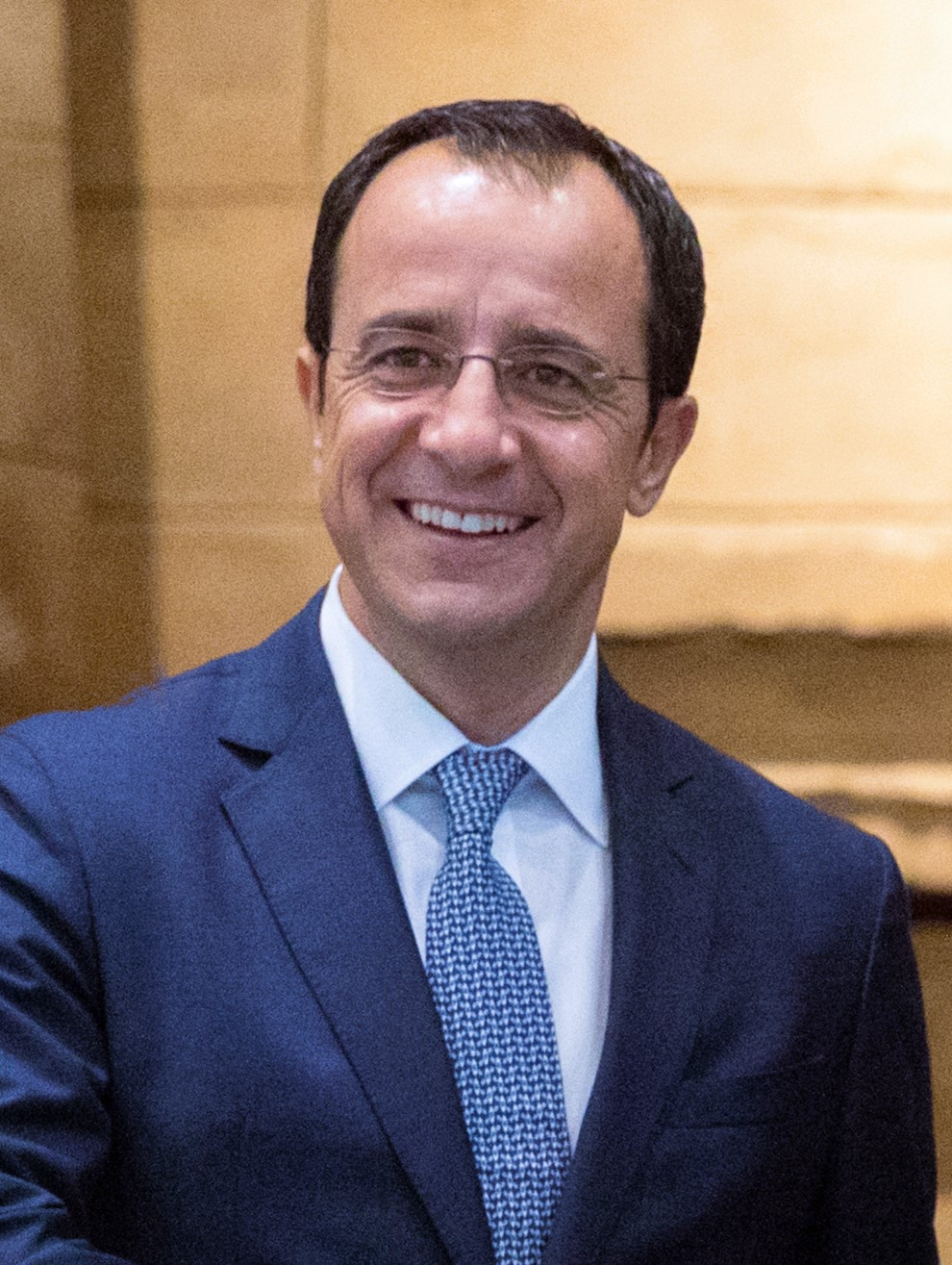
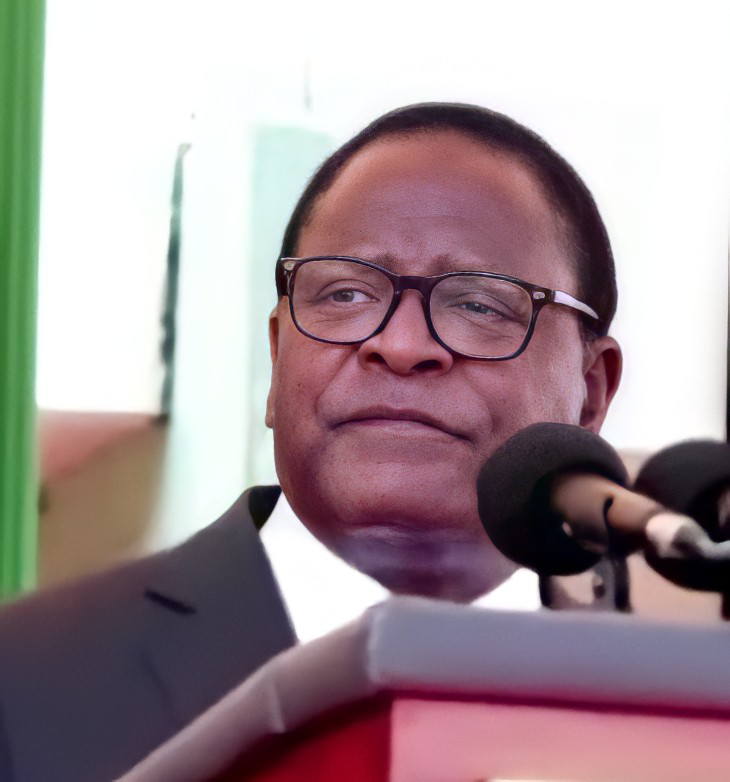
The Prime Minister of Bangladesh, Sheikh Hasina (left), the President of Cyprus, Nikos Christodoulides (middle), and the President of Malawi, Lazarus Chakwera (right), attended.
- Sheikh Hasina, Prime Minister of Bangladesh
  - Saida Muna Tasneem, Bangladeshi High Commissioner to the United Kingdom
- Dame Sandra Mason, President and former Governor-General of Barbados
  - Milton Inniss, Barbadian High Commissioner to the United Kingdom
- Mokgweetsi Masisi, President of Botswana
  - Dr Lemogang Kwape, Minister of Foreign Affairs of Botswana
- Joseph Dion Ngute, Prime Minister of Cameroon (representing the President of Cameroon), and Felicité Dion Ngute
- Nikos Christodoulides, President of Cyprus, and First Lady Philippa Karsera
- Charles Savarin, President of Dominica, and Clara Josephine Savarin
- Wiliame Katonivere, President of Fiji, and First Lady Filomena Katonivere
- Ali Bongo Ondimba, President of Gabon, and First Lady Sylvia Bongo Ondimba
- Mohammed B.S Jallow, Vice President of The Gambia
  - Mamadou Tangara, Minister of Foreign Affairs of The Gambia
- Nana Akufo-Addo, President of Ghana, and First Lady Rebecca Akufo-Addo
- Irfaan Ali, President of Guyana
  - Dr Rajendra Singh, Guyanan High Commissioner to the United Kingdom
- Jagdeep Dhankhar, Vice President of India (representing the President of India), and Sudesh Dhankhar
- William Ruto, President of Kenya, and First Lady Rachel Ruto
- Teuea Toatu, Vice President of Kiribati, and Brucetta Toatu
- Lazarus Chakwera, President of Malawi
  - Nancy Tembo, Minister of Foreign Affairs of Malawi
- Ibrahim Mohamed Solih, President of Maldives, and First Lady Fazna Ahmed
- George Vella, President of Malta, and First Lady Miriam Vella
- Prithvirajsing Roopun, President of Mauritius
- Filipe Nyusi, President of Mozambique, and First Lady Isaura Nyusi
- Saara Kuugongelwa-Amadhila, Prime Minister of Namibia
  - Linda Scott, Namibian High Commissioner to the United Kingdom
- Russ Kun, President of Nauru, and First Lady Simina Kun
- Muhammadu Buhari, President of Nigeria
  - Geoffrey Onyeama, Minister of Foreign Affairs of Nigeria
- Shehbaz Sharif, Prime Minister of Pakistan, and Zainab Suleman
- Paul Kagame, President of Rwanda, and First Lady Jeannette Kagame
- Tuimalealiʻifano Vaʻaletoʻa Sualauvi II, O le Ao o le Malo of Samoa, and Masiofo Faʻamausili Leinafo
  - Fatumanava Dr Pao Luteru, Samoan Ambassador to Belgium
- Wavel Ramkalawan, President of Seychelles, and First Lady Linda Ramkalawan
- Julius Maada Bio, President of Sierra Leone, and First Lady Fatima Bio
- Halimah Yacob, President of Singapore and First Gentleman Mohammed Abdullah Alhabshee
- Naledi Pandor, Minister of International Relations and Cooperation of South Africa (representing the President of South Africa)
- Ranil Wickremesinghe, President of Sri Lanka, and First Lady Maithree Wickremesinghe
- Asha-Rose Migiro, High Commissioner of Tanzania in London (representing the President of Tanzania)
- Faure Gnassingbé, President of Togo
- General Jeje Odongo, Minister of Foreign Affairs of Uganda
- Hakainde Hichilema, President of Zambia, and First Lady Mutinta Hichilema

== Foreign royalty ==
Traditionally, foreign sovereign monarchs have not attended British coronations and are instead represented by other members of their ruling families; however sixteen foreign reigning monarchs attended the coronation.

=== Members of reigning royal houses ===
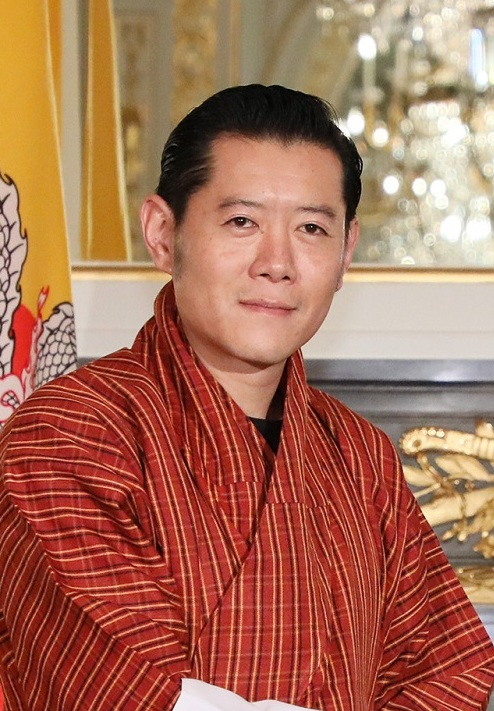
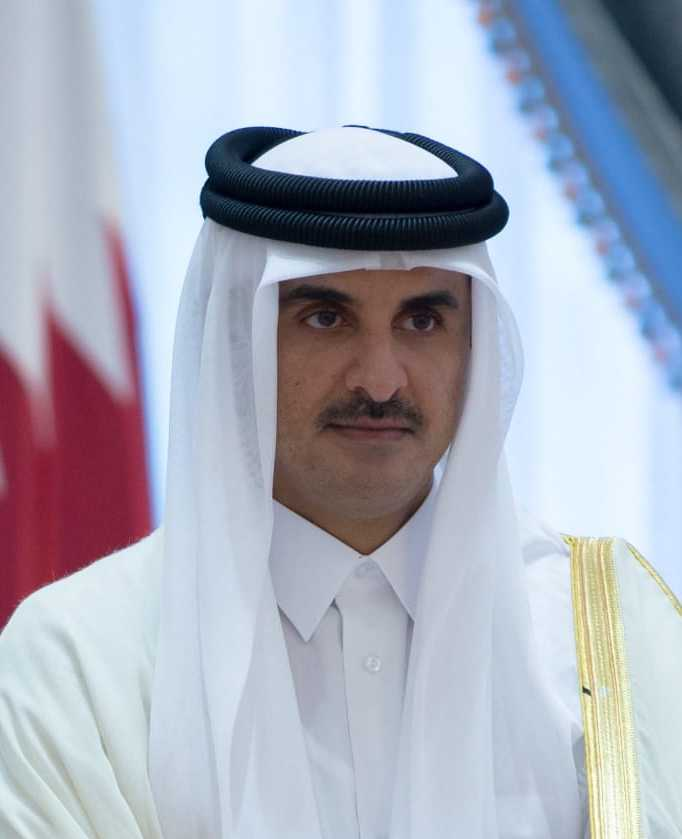
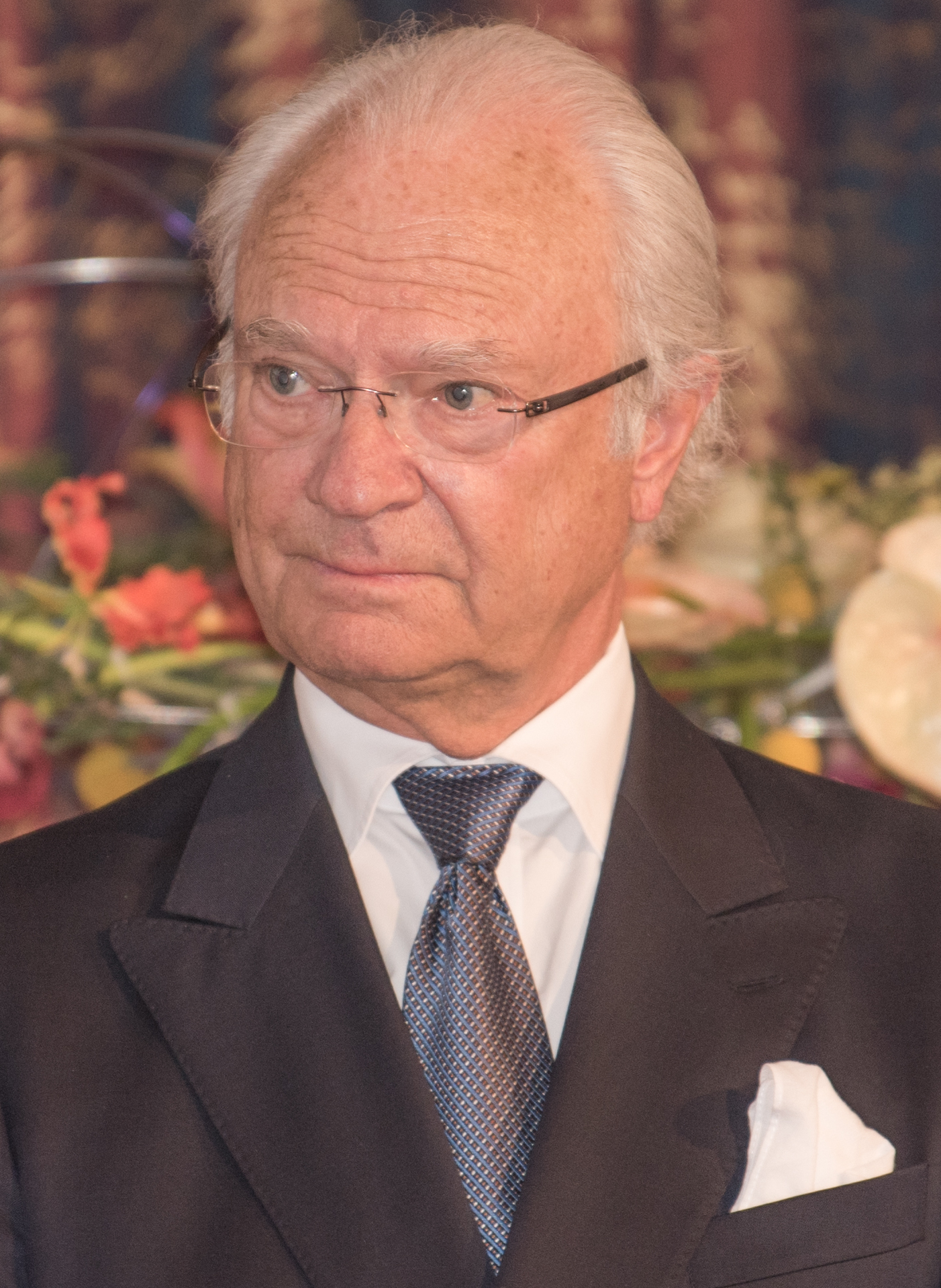
Sixteen foreign reigning monarchs, including the King of Bhutan (left), the Emir of Qatar (middle) and the King of Sweden (right), attended the coronation.

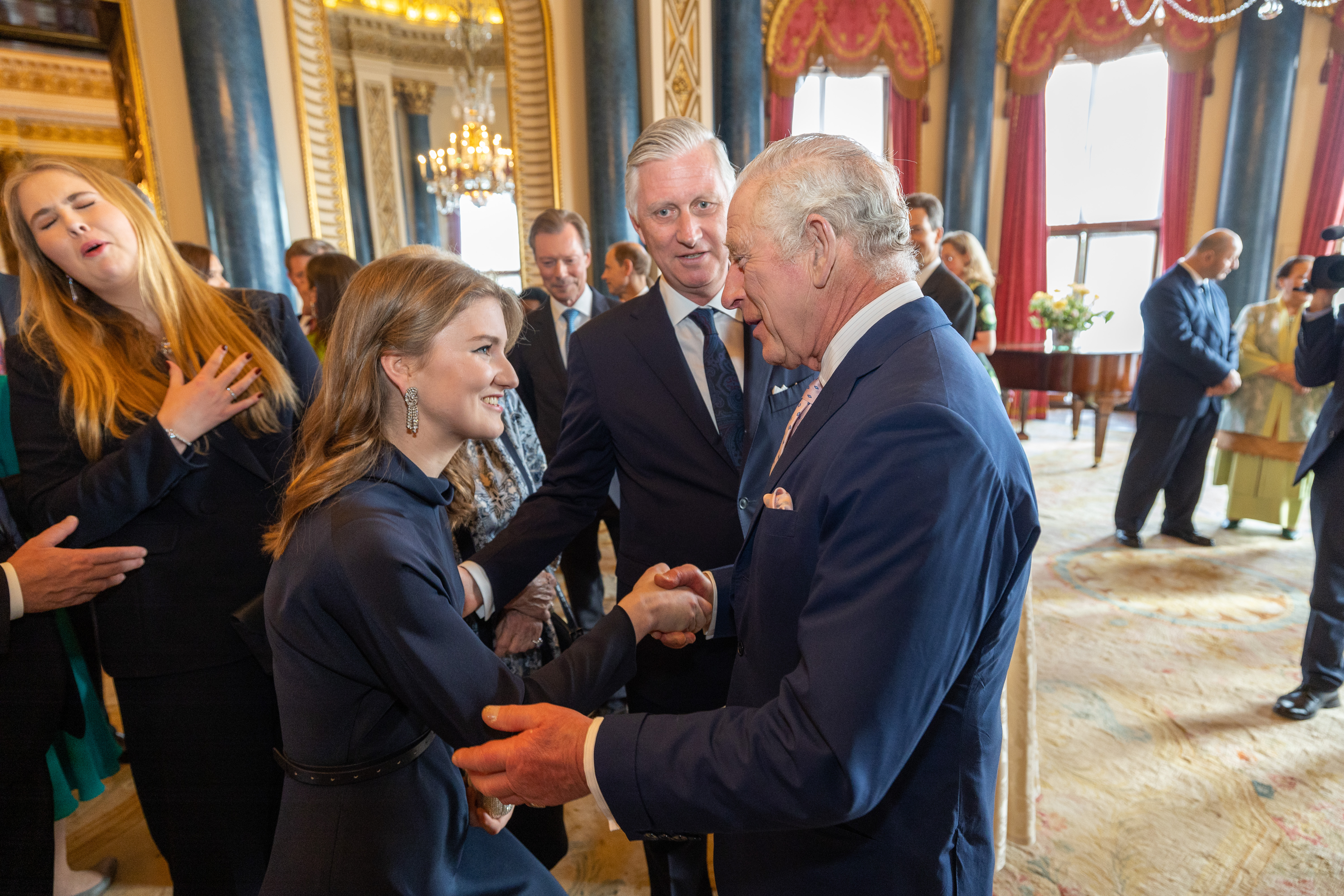
Princess Elisabeth, Duchess of Brabant meets King Charles III at the reception at Buckingham Palace. Watching on is her father King Philippe

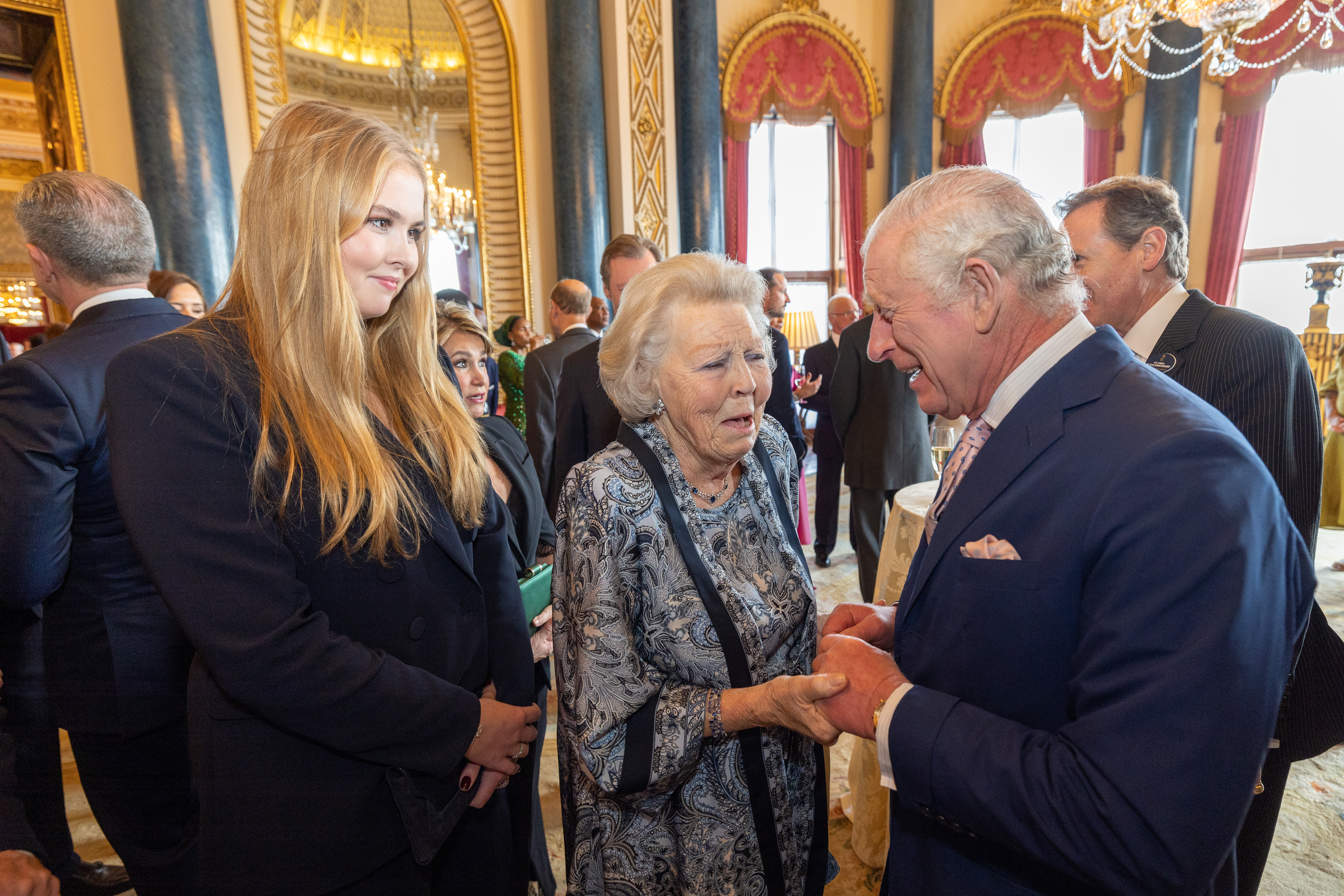
The Princess of Orange and Princess Beatrix meeting with King Charles III

- The King of Bahrain (Note: Present at both the coronation and the reception hosted by the King on 5 May.)
  - The Crown Prince and Prime Minister of Bahrain
- (Belgium) The King and Queen of the Belgians (Note: The Duchess of Brabant was present at the reception instead of the Queen of the Belgians.)
- The King and Queen of Bhutan
- The Sultan of Brunei (Note: Reigning sovereign of a member state within the Commonwealth of Nations.)
  - Prince Abdul Mateen of Brunei
- The Crown Prince and Crown Princess of Denmark (representing the Queen of Denmark)
- The King and Queen of Eswatini
- The Crown Prince and Crown Princess of Japan (representing the Emperor of Japan)
- The King and Queen of Jordan
- The Crown Prince of Kuwait (representing the Emir of Kuwait)
  - Salem Abdullah Al-Jaber Al-Sabah, Minister of Foreign Affairs of Kuwait
- The King and Queen of Lesotho
- The Hereditary Prince and Hereditary Princess of Liechtenstein (representing the Prince of Liechtenstein)
- The Grand Duke and Grand Duchess of Luxembourg
- The Yang di-Pertuan Agong and Raja Permaisuri Agong of Malaysia
- The Prince and Princess of Monaco
- Princess Lalla Meryem of Morocco (representing the King of Morocco)
- The King and Queen of the Netherlands (Note: Princess Beatrix of the Netherlands and the Princess of Orange represented Netherlands at the reception.)
- The Crown Prince and Crown Princess of Norway (representing the King of Norway)
- The Crown Prince of Oman (representing the Sultan of Oman)
- The Emir and Sheikha Jawaher bint Hamad of Qatar
  - Sheikh Hamad bin Abdullah Al Thani and Sheikha Amna bint Mohammed Al Thani
- Prince Turki bin Mohammed Al Saud of Saudi Arabia, Minister of State and Member of the Council of Ministers of Saudi Arabia (representing the King of Saudi Arabia)
- The King and Queen of Spain
- The King of Sweden
  - The Crown Princess of Sweden
- The King and Queen of Thailand
- The King and Queen of Tonga

=== Members of non-reigning royal houses ===
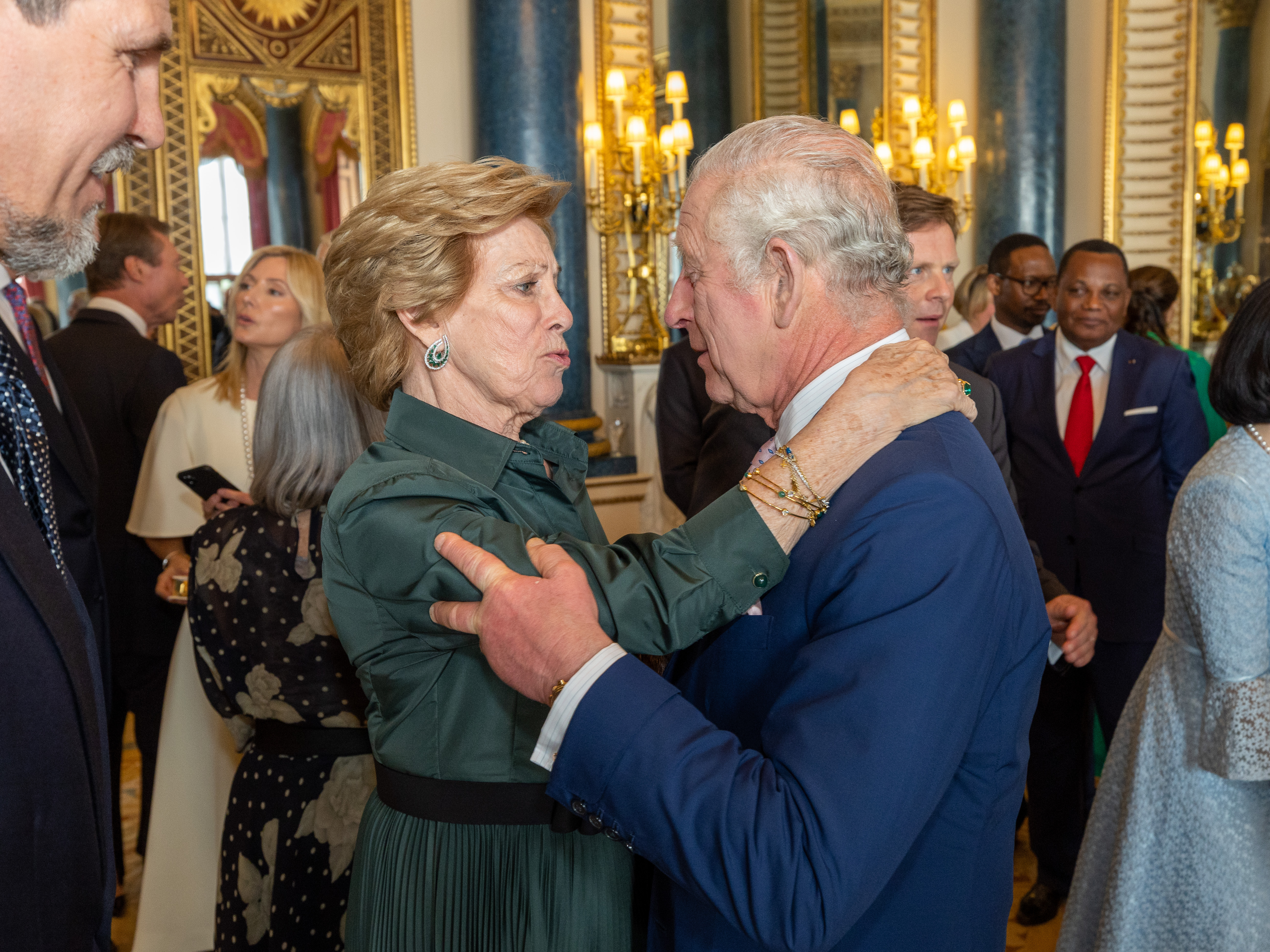
Queen Anne-Marie of the Hellenes (pictured, on the left, at the coronation reception) was the first non-reigning royal to announce her attendance.

- The Margrave and Margravine of Baden, the King's first cousin once removed and his wife
- Tsar Simeon II and Tsaritsa Margarita of Bulgaria, the King's fourth cousin twice removed and his wife
- Queen Anne-Marie of the Hellenes, the King's third cousin (and widow of the King's second cousin)
  - Crown Prince Pavlos and Crown Princess Marie-Chantal of Greece, the King's second cousin once removed and his wife
- The Landgrave of Hesse, the King's fourth cousin
- The Prince and Princess of Hohenlohe-Langenburg, the King's first cousin once removed and his wife
- The Custodian of the Crown of Romania and Prince Radu, the King's second cousin once removed and her husband
- Crown Prince Alexander and Crown Princess Katherine of Serbia, the King's second cousin once removed and his wife

=== Ceremonial monarchs ===
- The Asantehene and Princess Consort of Asante
- The Māori King and Māori Queen (Note: Attending the coronation as a part of the New Zealand delegation.)

== Foreign dignitaries ==
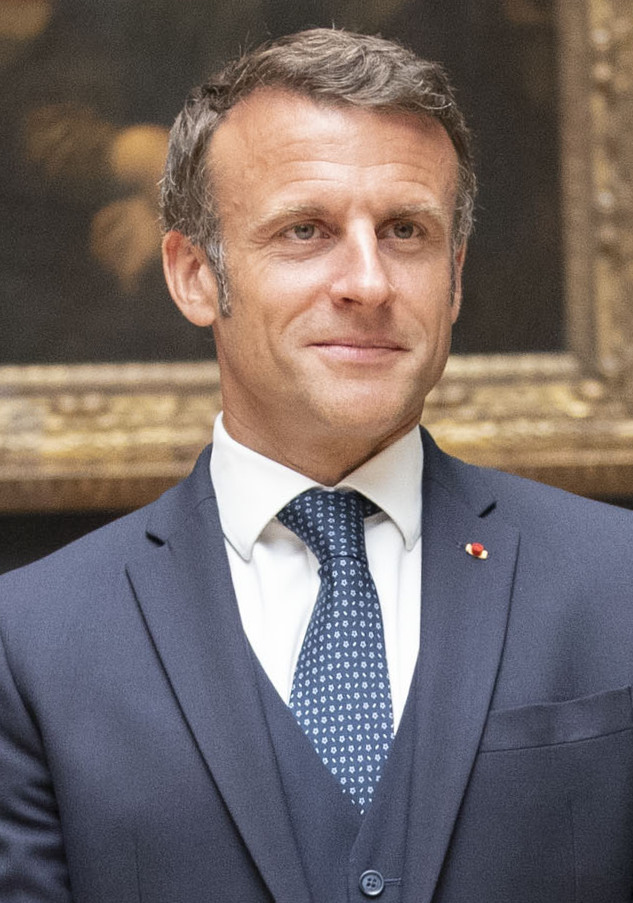
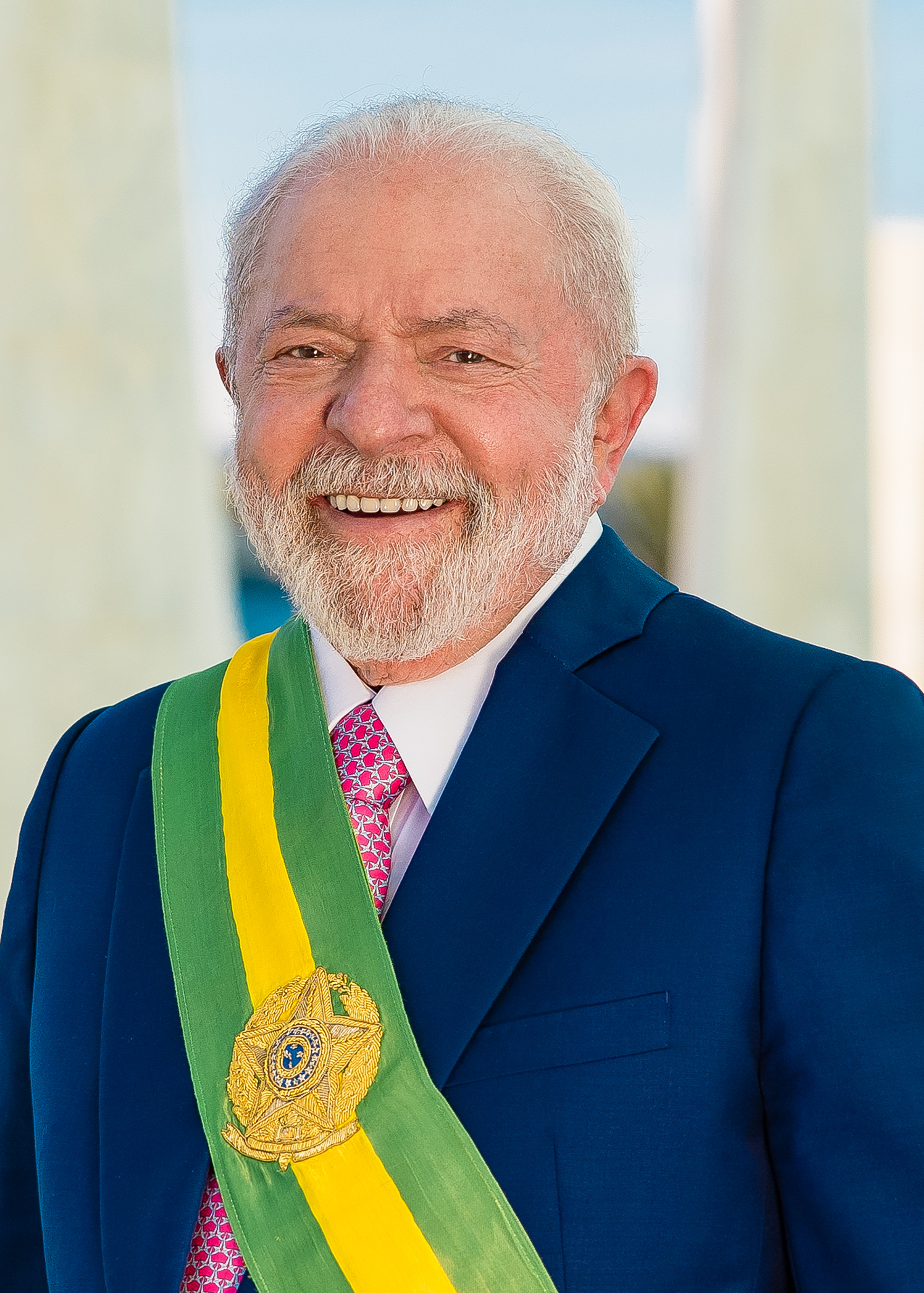
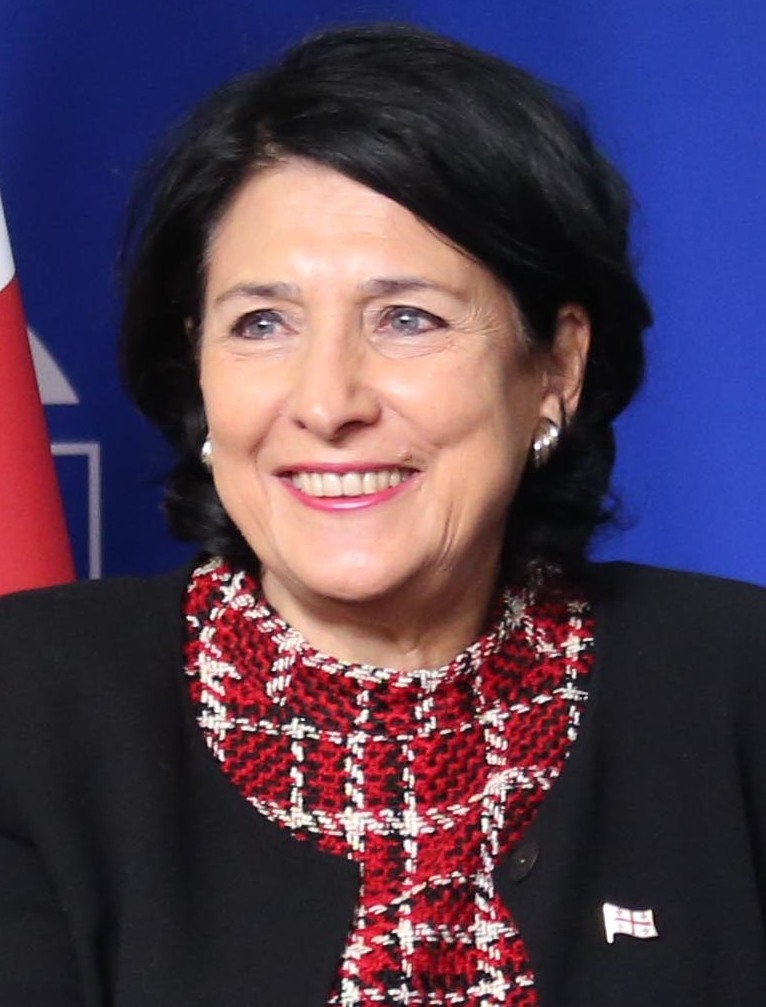
The President of France and Co-Prince of Principality of Andorra, Emmanuel Macron (left), the President of Brazil, Luiz Inácio Lula da Silva (middle), and the President of Georgia, Salome Zourabichvili (right), attended the coronation.

=== Heads of state and government ===
- Bajram Begaj, President of Albania, and First Lady Armanda Begaj
- João Lourenço, President of Angola, and First Lady Ana Dias Lourenço
- Archbishop Joan Enric Vives i Sicília, Co-Prince of Andorra
- Vahagn Khachaturyan, President of Armenia
- Alexander van der Bellen, President of Austria, and First Lady Doris Schmidauer
- Borjana Krišto, Chairwoman of the Council of Ministers of Bosnia and Herzegovina
- Luiz Inácio Lula da Silva, President of Brazil, and First Lady Rosângela Lula da Silva
- Galab Donev, Prime Minister of Bulgaria
  - Gabriella Doneva, daughter of the Prime Minister of Bulgaria
- Azali Assoumani, President of Comoros, and First Lady Ambari Assoumani (Note: Assoumani was also the concurrent Chairperson of the African Union.)
- Petr Pavel, President of the Czech Republic, and First Lady Eva Pavlová
- Ismaïl Omar Guelleh, President of Djibouti
- Luis Abinader, President of the Dominican Republic, and First Lady Raquel Arbaje
- Mostafa Madbouly, Prime Minister of Egypt
- Manuela Roka Botey, Prime Minister of Equatorial Guinea
- Alar Karis, President of Estonia, and First Lady Sirje Karis
- Sauli Niinistö, President of Finland, and First Lady Jenni Haukio
- Emmanuel Macron, President of France and Co-Prince of Andorra, and Brigitte Macron
- Salome Zourabichvili, President of Georgia
- Frank-Walter Steinmeier, President of Germany, and First Lady Elke Büdenbender
- Katerina Sakellaropoulou, President of Greece, and Pavlos Kotsonis
- Bernard Goumou, Prime Minister of Guinea, and Christelle Méniane Doré
- General Umaro Sissoco Embalo, President of Guinea-Bissau
- Katalin Novák, President of Hungary, and First Gentleman István Attila Veres
- Guðni Th. Jóhannesson, President of Iceland, and First Lady Eliza Reid
- Abdul Latif Rashid, President of Iraq, and First Lady Shanaz Ibrahim Ahmed
- Michael D. Higgins, President of Ireland, and Sabina Higgins
  - Leo Varadkar, Taoiseach of Ireland, and Matthew Barrett
- Isaac Herzog, President of Israel, and First Lady Michal Herzog

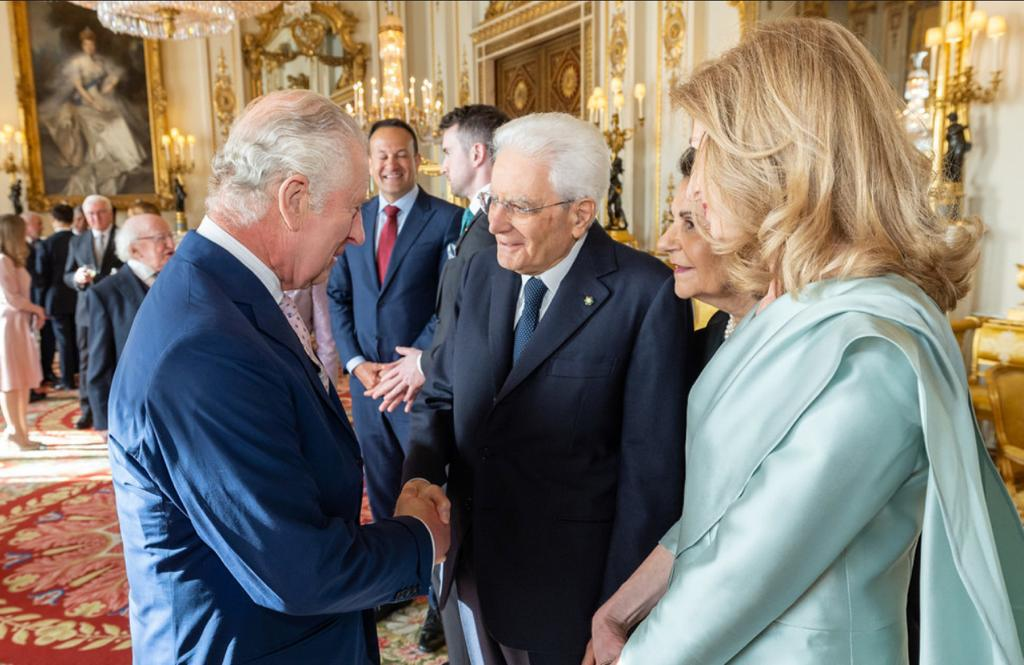
Charles III with Italian president Sergio Mattarella before the coronation

- Sergio Mattarella, President of Italy
  - Laura Mattarella, de facto First Lady of Italy
- Han Duck-soo, Prime Minister of South Korea
- Vjosa Osmani, President of Kosovo, and Lt Col Prindon Sadriu
- Egils Levits, President of Latvia, and First Lady Andra Levite
- Najib Mikati, Prime Minister of Lebanon, and May Mikati
- George Weah, President of Liberia, and First Lady Clar Weah
- Mohamed al-Menfi, Chairman of the Presidential Council of Libya
- Gitanas Nausėda, President of Lithuania, and First Lady Diana Nausėdienė
- David Kabua, President of the Marshall Islands, and First Lady Ginger Shoniber Kabua
- Mohamed Ould Ghazouani, President of Mauritania
- Maia Sandu, President of Moldova
- Ukhnaagiin Khürelsükh, President of Mongolia, and First Lady Luvsandorjiin Bolortsetseg
- Milo Đukanović, President of Montenegro, and First Lady Lidija Đukanović
- Mohamed Bazoum, President of Niger
- Stevo Pendarovski, President of North Macedonia, and First Lady Elizabeta Gjorgievska
- Mario Abdo Benítez, President of Paraguay, and First Lady Silvana López Moreira
- Bongbong Marcos, President of the Philippines, and First Lady Liza Araneta Marcos
- Andrzej Duda, President of Poland, and First Lady Agata Kornhauser-Duda
- Marcelo Rebelo de Sousa, President of Portugal
- Klaus Iohannis, President of Romania, and First Lady Carmen Iohannis
- Alessandro Scarano and Adele Tonnini, Captains Regent of San Marino
- Patrice Trovoada, Prime Minister of Sāo Tomé and Principe, and Nana Travoada
- Macky Sall, President of Senegal
- Zuzana Čaputová, President of Slovakia, and Juraj Rizman
- Nataša Pirc Musar, President of Slovenia, and First Gentleman Aleš Musar
- Alain Berset, President of the Swiss Confederation, and Muriel Zeender
- Serdar Berdimuhamedow, President of Turkmenistan
- Denys Shmyhal, Prime Minister of Ukraine
- Võ Văn Thưởng, President of Vietnam
- Emmerson Mnangagwa, President of Zimbabwe

=== Governmental representatives ===
- Ahmed Attaf, Minister of Foreign Affairs of Algeria (representing the President of Algeria)
- Sahiba Gafarova, Speaker of the National Assembly of Azerbaijan
- Rui Alberto de Figueiredo Soares, Minister of Foreign Affairs of Cape Verde
- Mahamat Saleh Annadif, Minister of Foreign Affairs of Chad
- Verónica Alcocer, First Lady of Colombia (representing the President of Colombia)
  - Álvaro Leyva, Minister of Foreign Affairs of Colombia
- Han Zheng, Vice President of the People's Republic of China (representing the President of the People's Republic of China)
- Jean-Claude Gakosso, Minister of Foreign Affairs of the Republic of Congo
- Christophe Mboso N'Kodia Pwanga, President of the National Assembly of the Democratic Republic of the Congo (representing the President of the Democratic Republic of the Congo)
- Arnoldo André Tinoco, Minister of Foreign Affairs of Costa Rica (representing the President of Costa Rica), and Adriana Jiménez Beeche
- Gordan Grlić-Radman, Minister of Foreign Affairs of Croatia, and Marijana Grlić-Radman
- Salvador Valdés Mesa, Vice President of Cuba
- Gustavo Manrique, Minister of Foreign Affairs of Ecuador (representing the President of Ecuador), and Daniela Maria Cañarte Freile
- Félix Ulloa, Vice President of El Salvador
- Renato Florentino, Vice President of Honduras (representing the President of Honduras)
- Tiémoko Meyliet Koné, Vice President of Ivory Coast (representing the President of Ivory Coast)
- Erlan Qoşanov, Head of the Majilis of the Parliament of Kazakhstan
- Edil Baisalov, Deputy Prime Minister of Kyrgyzstan
- Yvette Sylla, Minister of Foreign Affairs of Madagascar
- Narayan Prakash Saud, Minister of Foreign Affairs of Nepal (representing the President of Nepal), and Jyotshna Adhikari Saud
- Hassoumi Massaoudou, Minister of Foreign Affairs of Niger
- Badr bin Hamad Al Busaidi, Minister of Foreign Affairs of Oman
- Riyad al-Maliki, Minister of Foreign Affairs and Expatriates of the State of Palestine
- Janaina Tewaney, Minister of Foreign Affairs of Panama, and Amid Anil Lala
- Aïssata Tall Sall, Minister of Foreign Affairs of Senegal
- Barnaba Marial Benjamin, Minister of Presidential Affairs of South Sudan (representing President Salva Kiir)
- Adaljiza Magno, Minister of Foreign Affairs of Timor-Leste, and Rosentino dos Anjos Amado Ribeiro Hei
- Nabil Ammar, Minister of Foreign Affairs of Tunisia (representing the President of Tunisia)
- Fuat Oktay, Vice President of Turkey (representing the President of Turkey), and Havva Hümeyra Sahin Oktay
- Olena Zelenska, First Lady of Ukraine (representing the President of Ukraine)
- Mohamed bin Hadi Al Hussaini, Minister of State for Financial Affairs of the United Arab Emirates (representing the President of the United Arab Emirates) (Note: Sheikh Mansour bin Zayed Al Nahyan represented the United Arab Emirates at the reception.)
- Jill Biden, First Lady of the United States (representing the President of the United States)
  - John Kerry, Special Presidential Envoy for Climate
- Frederick Shava, Minister of Foreign Affairs of Zimbabwe
- Mthuli Ncube, Minister of Finance of Zimbabwe
- Cardinal Pietro Parolin, Cardinal Secretary of State (representing the Pope)

=== Diplomats ===
- Lounès Magramane, Algerian Ambassador to the United Kingdom
- Carles Jordana Madero, Andorran Ambassador to the United Kingdom
- Javier Esteban Figueroa, Argentinian Ambassador to the United Kingdom, and Alessandra Viggiano Marra
- Varuzhan Nersesyan, Armenian Ambassador to the United Kingdom
- Elin Suleymanov, Azerbaijani Ambassador to the United Kingdom
- Jean Pierre Uwitonze, Burundian Chargé d'Affaires in the United Kingdom, and Scholastique Nigena
- Kan Pharidh, Cambodian Ambassador to the United Kingdom
- Susana Herrera Quezada, Chilean Ambassador to the United Kingdom, and Kassian Obkircher
- Teferi Melesse Desta, Ethiopian Ambassador to the United Kingdom
- José Alberto Briz Gutiérrez, Guatemalan Ambassador to the United Kingdom
- Euvrard Saint Amand, Haitian Ambassador to the United Kingdom, and Wilmide Saint Amand
- Iván Romero Martínez, Honduran Ambassador to the United Kingdom
- Desra Percaya, Indonesian Ambassador to the United Kingdom, and Diana Mawarsari Percaya
- Magzhan Ilyassov, Kazakh Ambassador to the United Kingdom
- Choe Il, North Korean Ambassador to the United Kingdom (Note: The governments of North Korea and Nicaragua were permitted to be represented only at the ambassadorial level.)
- Ulan Djusupov, Kyrgyz Ambassador to the United Kingdom
- Douangmany Gnotsyoudom, Laotian Ambassador, and Soudalack Phounsavath
- Khaled Jweda, Libyan Chargé d'Affairs in the United Kingdom
- Sidya Elhadj, Mauritanian Ambassador to the United Kingdom
- Josefa González Blanco Ortiz Mena, Mexican Ambassador to the United Kingdom
- Hakim Hajoui, Moroccan Ambassador to the United Kingdom
- Guisell Morales-Echaverry, Nicaraguan Ambassador to the United Kingdom
- Ilana Seid, Palaun Ambassador to the United Nations
- Husam Zomlot, Head of the Palestinian Mission to the United Kingdom
- Juan Carlos Gamarra Skeels, Peruvian Ambassador to the United Kingdom, and Désirée von Preussen de Gamarra
- Nuno Brito, Portuguese Ambassador to the United Kingdom
- Aleksandra Joksimović, Serbian Ambassador to the United Kingdom, and Siniša Krajčinović
- Khalid M A Hassan, Sudanese Chargé d'affaires to the United Kingdom
- Amwidhker Jethu-Ramkrishan, Surinamese Honorary Consul in the United Kingdom, and Anjali Jethu-Ramkrishan
- Rukhshona Emomali, Tajik Ambassador to the United Kingdom, and Shamsullo Sakhibov
- Mansoor Abulhoul, Emirati Ambassador to the United Kingdom
- Yassin Saeed Noman Ahmed, Yemeni Ambassador to the United Kingdom, and Nadhihah Sowileh

=== International organisations ===
- Charles Michel, President of the European Council
- Ursula von der Leyen, President of the European Commission, and Heiko von der Leyen
- Roberta Metsola, President of the European Parliament, and Ukko Metsola
- Jürgen Rigterink, Vice-President of the European Bank for Reconstruction and Development, and Joanna Brazier
- Kitack Lim, Secretary-General of the International Maritime Organisation, and Jung Ae Do
- Jens Stoltenberg, Secretary General of NATO, and Ingrid Schulerud
- Mathias Cormann, Secretary General of the OECD, and Hayley Cormann
- Amina Jane Mohammed, Deputy Secretary-General of the United Nations (representing the Secretary-General of the United Nations)

== Religious leaders ==
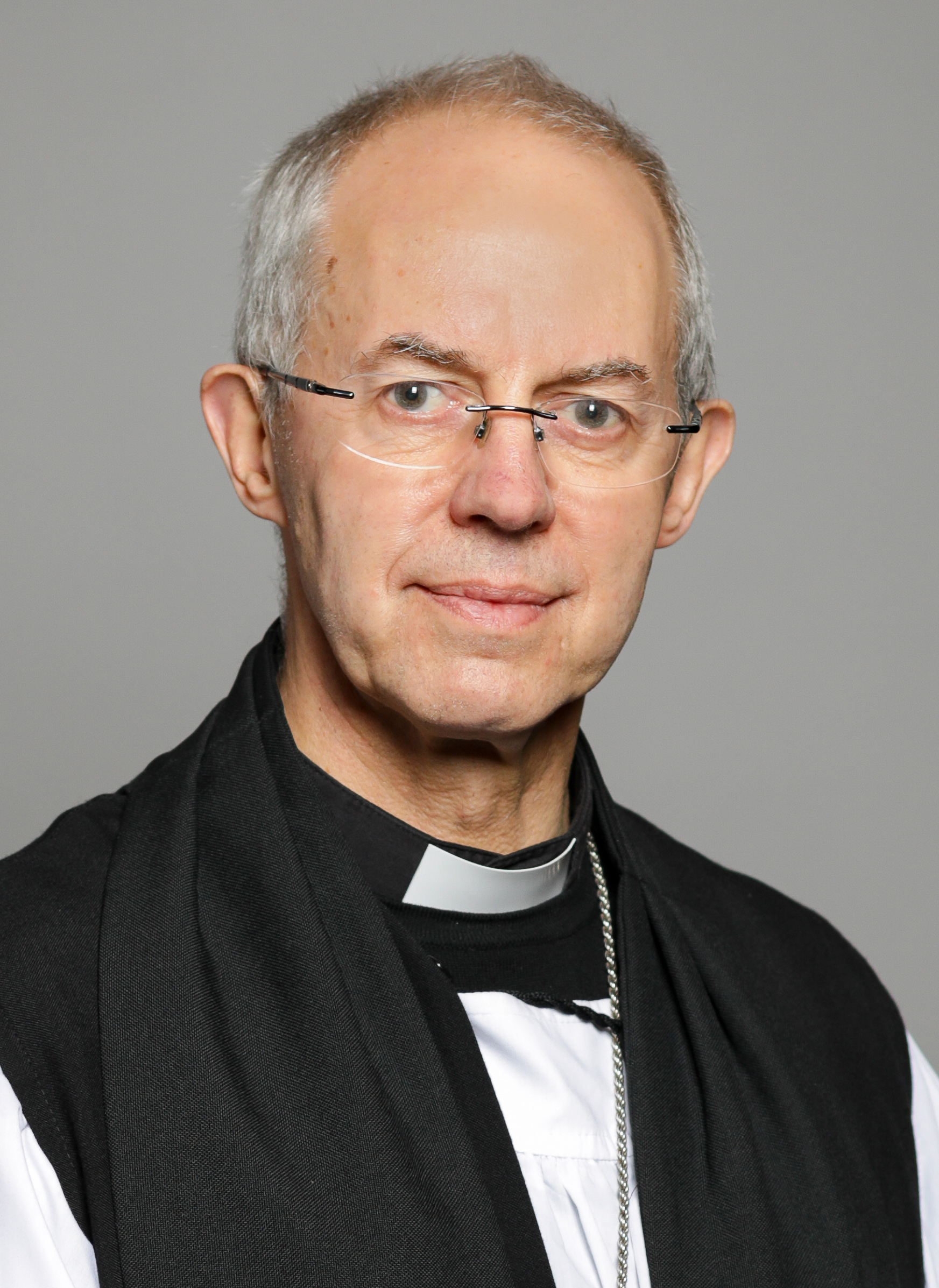
Archbishop Justin Welby presided over the coronation

=== Christian ===
==== Church of England ====
- Justin Welby, Archbishop of Canterbury and Primate of All England
  - Tosin Oladipo, Chaplain to the Archbishop of Canterbury and bearer of the Primatial Cross of Canterbury
  - Adrian Daffern, Chaplain Extraordinary to the Archbishop of Canterbury
- Stephen Cottrell, Archbishop of York and Primate of England
  - Dr Jenny Wright, Chaplain to The Archbishop of York and bearer of the Primatial Cross of York
- Dame Sarah Mullally, Bishop of London and Dean of His Majesty's Chapels Royal
- Rose Hudson-Wilkin, Bishop of Dover, presenting The Queen Consort's Rod
- Paul Butler, Bishop of Durham
- Michael Beasley, Bishop of Bath and Wells
- Graham Usher, Bishop of Norwich
- Richard Jackson, Bishop of Hereford
- David Hoyle MBE, Dean of Westminster
  - David Stanton, Sub-Dean and Canon Treasurer
  - Anthony Ball, Canon Rector
  - Dr James Hawkey, Canon Theologian and Almoner
  - Tricia Hillas, Canon Steward and Archdeacon of Westminster, and Chaplain to the Speaker of the House of Commons
  - Mark Birch MVO, minor canon and precentor
  - Robert Latham, minor canon and sacrist
  - Ralph Godsall, acting minor canon
  - Paul Baumann CBE, Receiver General of Westminster Abbey
  - Sir Kenneth Olisa OBE, High Bailiff and Searcher of the Sanctuary of Westminster Abbey
- Canon Paul Wright LVO, Sub-Dean of His Majesty's Chapels Royal
- Professor David Fergusson OBE, Dean of the Chapel Royal in Scotland and Dean of the Thistle
- David Conner KCVO, Dean of Windsor

==== Church of Ireland ====
- John McDowell, Archbishop of Armagh and Primate of All Ireland, presenting the Sovereign's Orb

==== Church of Scotland ====
- Iain Greenshields, Moderator of the General Assembly of the Church of Scotland, presenting the Bible

==== Scottish Episcopal Church ====
- Mark Strange, Bishop of Moray, Ross and Caithness and Primus of the Scottish Episcopal Church, presenting the Sceptre with Cross
- John Armes, Bishop of Edinburgh, Usher of the White Rod

==== Church in Wales ====
- Andrew John, Archbishop of Wales and Bishop of Bangor, presenting the Sceptre with Dove

==== Roman Catholic Church ====
- Cardinal Vincent Nichols, the Archbishop of Westminster
- Eamon Martin, Archbishop of Armagh and Primate of All Ireland
- Mark O'Toole, Archbishop of Cardiff
- Hugh Gilbert OSB, Bishop of Aberdeen and President of Bishops' Conference of Scotland

==== Other Christian denominations ====
- Nikitas Loulias, the Greek Orthodox Archbishop of Thyateira and Great Britain
- Hosam Naoum, the Anglican Bishop in Jerusalem
- Helen Cameron, Moderator of the Free Churches Group
- Bishop Mike Royal, General Secretary of Churches Together in England

=== Other religions ===
- Rabbi Sir Ephraim Mirvis, Chief Rabbi of the United Hebrew Congregations of Great Britain and the Commonwealth
- Marie van der Zyl, president of the Board of Deputies of British Jews
- Ven Bogoda Seelawimala Thera, Head Priest of the London Buddhist Vihara and Chief Sangha Nayaka of Great Britain
- Malcolm Deboo, President, Zoroastrian Trust Funds of Europe

== Royal Household ==
=== The King's household ===
- Sir Anthony Johnstone-Burt, Master of the Household
- Lieutenant-Colonel Michael Vernon, Comptroller of the Lord Chamberlain's Office
- Jo Churchill, Vice Chamberlain of the Household
- Marcus Jones, Treasurer of the Household
- Rebecca Harris, Comptroller of the Household
- James Newcome, Clerk of the Closet (also Bishop of Carlisle)
- Dr John Inge, Lord High Almoner (also Bishop of Worcester)
- Lieutenant Colonel Jonathan Thompson, Groom of the Robes
- Sir Michael Stevens, Keeper of the Privy Purse and Treasurer to His Majesty
- Sir Edward Young, Joint Principal Private Secretary to The King
- Sir Clive Alderton, Principal Private Secretary to The King and Queen
- John Sorabji, Deputy Private Secretary to The King
- Matthew Magee, Deputy Private Secretary to The King
- Tim Knox, Director of the Royal Collection
- Lieutenant Colonel Stephen Segrave, Secretary of the Central Chancery of the Orders of Knighthood
- Sarah Clarke, Lady Usher of the Black Rod
- Paul Whybrew, Sergeant at Arms
- Richard Thompson, Sergeant at Arms
- Francis Dymoke, The Honourable The King's Champion and bearer of the Royal Standard
- Viscount Maitland, representing the Earl of Lauderdale, Bearer of the National Flag of Scotland
- Brigadier Andrew Jackson, Resident Governor of the Tower of London and Keeper of the Jewel House
- Master Ralph Tollemache, son of Edward Tollemache, the King's godson (page of honour)
- Eva Omaghomi, Director of Community Engagement to the King
- Dame Judith Weir, Master of the King's Music and composer of "Brighter visions shine afar"
- John Warren, Racing Manager to the King
- Sir Stephen Lamport, former Private Secretary to the former Prince of Wales
- Sir Michael Peat, former Private Secretary to the former Prince of Wales
- Mark Leishman, former Private Secretary to the former Prince of Wales
- Scott Furssedonn-Wood, former Deputy Private Secretary to the former Prince of Wales
- Patrick Harverson, former Communications Secretary to the former Prince of Wales

=== The Queen's household ===
- Sophie Densham, Private Secretary to The Queen
- Major Oliver Plunket, Groom of the Robes to the Queen
- The Marchioness of Lansdowne, Queen's companion (Lady in Attendance)
- The Baroness Chisholm of Owlpen, Queen's companion
- Lady Sarah Keswick, Queen's companion
- The Hon. Lady Brooke, Queen's companion and Sir Francis Brooke 4th Bt, His Majesty's Representative at Ascot
- Sarah Troughton, Lord Lieutenant of Wiltshire and Queen's companion (the King's second cousin), and Peter Troughton
  - Master Nicholas Barclay, grandson of Sarah Troughton (page of honour to the King)
- Jane von Westenholz, Queen's companion

=== The Prince and Princess of Wales's Household ===
- Lieutenant Commander Robert Dixon, Equerry

=== Elizabeth II's household ===
- The Dowager Lady Glenconner, maid of honour at the coronation of Elizabeth II in 1953 and family friend of the King and Queen
- The Lady Hussey of North Bradley, Woman of the Bedchamber to Queen Elizabeth II

== Performers ==
- Andrew Nethsingha, Organist and Master of the Choristers, Westminster Abbey
- Peter Holder, Sub-Organist, Westminster Abbey
- Matthew Jorysz, Assistant Organist, Westminster Abbey
- Sir Antonio Pappano, conductor of the Coronation Orchestra
- Sir John Eliot Gardiner, conductor of the Monteverdi Choir and English Baroque Soloists
- Joseph McHardy, Director of Music, His Majesty's Chapel Royal, St James's Palace
- Ruth McCartney, Director of Music, Methodist College, Belfast
- Christopher Gray, Director of Music (until April 2023), Truro Cathedral Choir
- Trumpet Major Julian Sandford, State Trumpeter of the Household Cavalry
- Wing Commander Piers Morrell, Principal Director of Music, Royal Air Force
- Tim Garrard, Director of Music, The King's Scholars of Westminster School
- Abimbola Amoako-Gyampah, Director, the Ascension Choir
- Dr Alexander Lingas, Director, the Byzantine Chant Ensemble
- Alis Huws, harpist, "Crossing the Stone/Tros y Garre"
- Samuel Strachan, Child of His Majesty's Chapel Royal, St James's Palace
- Sir Bryn Terfel, soloist, Coronation Kyrie eleison
- Jason Edwards, trumpter
- Matthew Williams, trumpter
- Roderick Williams, soloist, "Confortare"
- Pretty Yende, soloist, "Sacred Fire"

== Other guests ==
- Jay Blades, The Prince's Foundation ambassador
- Anthony "Ant" McPartlin, Goodwill Ambassador for The Prince's Trust
- Declan "Dec" Donnelly, Goodwill Ambassador for The Prince's Trust
- Edward Enninful, Global Ambassador for The Prince's Trust
- Lionel Richie, Chairman of the Global Ambassador Group for The Prince's Trust
- Katy Perry, ambassador for the British Asian Trust
- Sir Karl Jenkins, composer of "Tros y Garreg", written for the coronation
- Sarah Class, composer of "Sacred Fire", written for the coronation
- Ozwald Boateng
- Gyles Brandreth
- Dame Julia Cleverdon
- Dame Sally Davies, Master of Trinity College, Cambridge
- Jonathan Dimbleby
- Amelia Fawcett, Lady Usher of the Purple Rod
- Dame Katherine Grainger
- Loyd Grossman
- Dame Laura Lee, Chief Executive of Maggie's Centres
- Don McCullin
- Sir Michael and Lady Morpurgo
- Tony Juniper
- Sir Peter Ratcliffe
- Sir Nicholas Serota
- Sir William Shawcross
- Carole Souter
- Debbie Wiseman, composer of "Alleluia Alleluia", written for the coronation
- Joan Armatrading
- Rowan Atkinson
- Finnegan Biden, granddaughter of the President of the United States
- Sir Kenneth Branagh
- Tim Davie, Director-General of the British Broadcasting Corporation
- Dame Judi Dench
- Sir Lloyd Dorfman
- Joseph Dweck
- Dynamo
- Edward Fox
- Stephen Fry
- Dame Kelly Holmes
- Kelly Jones
- Dame Joanna Lumley
- Neil MacGregor
- Sir Roger Penrose
- Santa Montefiore
- Simon Sebag Montefiore
- Dame Maggie Smith
- Sir Tom Stoppard
- Sir Bryn Terfel
- Dame Emma Thompson and Greg Wise

== Citizenry ==
Invitations were extended to 450 British Empire Medal recipients to join the congregation at Westminster Abbey in recognition of their services and support to their local communities, especially during the COVID-19 pandemic. Another 400 representatives from charitable organisations were also invited to watch the coronation and procession at St Margaret's, Westminster, with 200 individuals being selected by the King and Queen from the Prince's Trust and its international subsidiaries, the Prince's Foundation, Barnardo's, the National Literacy Trust, Ebony Horse Club, and the Circular Bioeconomy Alliance. The other 200 were nominated by His Majesty's Government in recognition of their contributions to the coronation day and include people from the Scout Association, Girlguiding, St John Ambulance, and the National Citizen Service.

== Absences ==
- The president of Croatia, Zoran Milanović, was invited, but was unable to attend due to a defect on the government's plane.
- The president of Serbia, Aleksandar Vučić, was invited to the coronation, but cancelled his attendance following the Belgrade school shooting.
- The president of Turkey, Recep Tayyip Erdoğan, declined his invitation, as he did to Elizabeth II's funeral, due to the forthcoming presidential election.

== Uninvited states ==
The governments in six countries not invited to the state funeral of Elizabeth II—Afghanistan, Belarus, Myanmar, Russia, Syria and Venezuela—were also not invited to the coronation. Additionally, Iran was also uninvited.

== See also ==
- List of people present at the Accession Council of Charles III
