= Clerk to the Northern Ireland Assembly =

Clerical role in Parliament of the UK

Clerk to the Assembly
- Incumbent; Lesley Hogg since 27 June 2016
- Northern Ireland Assembly
- Status: Principal constitutional adviser to the Assembly
- Appointer: Northern Ireland Assembly Commission (de jure)
- Inaugural holder: Paul Grice
- Formation: 1999 first temporary appointment

The clerk to the Assembly is the chief executive of the Northern Ireland Assembly.

== Appointment ==
The clerk is appointed by the Northern Ireland Assembly Commission.

== Duties ==
The role of the clerk has three main duties: "First, as Clerk she is responsible for the provision of procedural advice to the Speaker and Members of the Assembly. Second, as Chief Executive she is responsible to the Assembly Commission for the management of the administrative support services to the Assembly. Third, the Clerk/Chief Executive is the Accounting Officer for the Assembly's budget."

== Incumbent ==
As of June 2016, the office is currently held by Lesley Hogg.
