= Lesley Hogg =

British civil servant

Lesley Hogg is a British civil servant. She has served as the Clerk and Chief Executive of the Northern Ireland Assembly since 27 June 2016.

== Career ==
Before joining the Northern Ireland Assembly, Lesley served as the Director of Finance and Corporate Affairs for Agri-Food and Biosciences Institute (AFBI).

She also served as the chief executive officer of Premier Power Ltd.
