= List of people present at the Accession Council of Charles III =

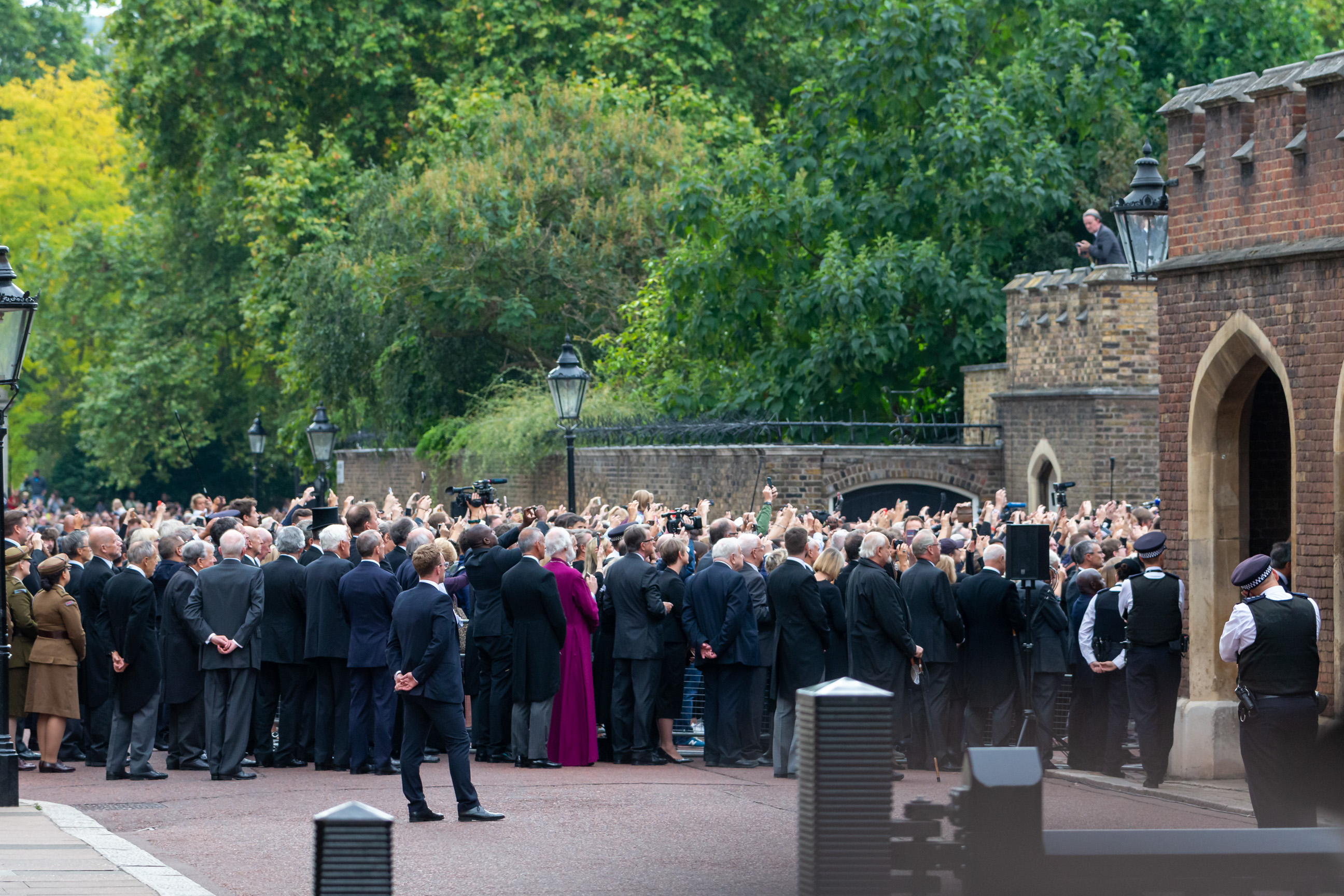
Members of the public and members of the Accession Council watching the proclamation of the new king in Friary Court at St James's Palace.

The Accession Council is a ceremonial body which assembles in St James's Palace in London upon the death of a monarch to make formal proclamation of the accession of the successor to the throne. Under the terms of the Act of Settlement 1701, a new monarch succeeds automatically (demise of the Crown).

The Accession Council of Charles III occurred on 10 September 2022 at 10:00am BST at St James's Palace in London. Even though all 700 members of the Privy Council were eligible to attend the Accession Council, only 200 were summoned due to limitations of space.

Out of the King's presence, the Lord President of the Council had the clerk of the Council read the Accession Proclamation. The proclamation was signed by Queen Camilla, the new queen consort; Prince William, the new Prince of Wales; Justin Welby, the archbishop of Canterbury; Brandon Lewis, the lord chancellor; Stephen Cottrell, the archbishop of York; the Duke of Norfolk, the earl marshal; Penny Mordaunt, the lord president; and Liz Truss, the prime minister. The lord president then read the orders of council on issues dealing with the public proclamations and gun salutes at Hyde Park and the Tower of London.

== Participants ==
- King Charles III
- Queen Camilla
- William, Prince of Wales
- Liz Truss, Prime Minister of the United Kingdom
- Penny Mordaunt, Lord President of the Council
- Justin Welby, Archbishop of Canterbury
- Stephen Cottrell, Archbishop of York
- Richard Tilbrook, Clerk of the Privy Council
- Edward Fitzalan-Howard, 18th Duke of Norfolk, Earl Marshal
- Brandon Lewis, Lord Chancellor

== Attendees ==
=== Cabinet members ===
- Edward Argar, Minister for the Cabinet Office
- Kemi Badenoch, president of the Board of Trade
- Jake Berry, Minister without Portfolio.
- Suella Braverman, Home Secretary
- Sir Robert Buckland, Secretary of State for Wales
- James Cleverly, Foreign Secretary
- Thérèse Coffey, Deputy Prime Minister of the United Kingdom
- Michelle Donelan, Secretary of State for Digital, Culture, Media and Sport
- Michael Ellis, Attorney General for England and Wales
- Chris Heaton-Harris, Secretary of State for Northern Ireland
- Alister Jack, Secretary of State for Scotland
- Ranil Jayawardena, Secretary of State for Environment, Food and Rural Affairs
- Kwasi Kwarteng, Chancellor of the Exchequer
- Kit Malthouse, Secretary of State for Education
- Wendy Morton, Chief Whip
- Chris Philp, Chief Secretary to the Treasury
- Jacob Rees-Mogg, Secretary of State for Business, Energy and Industrial Strategy
- Alok Sharma, President for COP26
- Chloe Smith, Secretary of State for Work and Pensions
- Anne-Marie Trevelyan, Secretary of State for Transport
- Nicholas True, Baron True, Leader of the House of Lords
- Ben Wallace, Secretary of State for Defence
- Nadhim Zahawi, Chancellor of the Duchy of Lancaster

=== City of London ===
- Alison Gowman, Sheriff of the City of London
- Vincent Keaveny, Lord Mayor of London
- Nicholas Lyons, Sheriff of the City of London
- Mark Lucraft, Recorder of London

=== Civil servants ===
- Sir Philip Barton, Permanent Under-Secretary of the Foreign Office
- Simon Case, Cabinet Secretary
- Ceri King, Deputy Clerk of the Privy Council

=== Commonwealth realms ===
- Shannon Austin, Acting High Commissioner of New Zealand to the United Kingdom
- Ralph Goodale, High Commissioner of Canada to the United Kingdom
- Kisha Abba Grant, High Commissioner of Grenada to the United Kingdom
- Patrice Laird Grant, Acting High Commissioner of Jamaica to the United Kingdom
- Ellison Greenslade, High Commissioner of The Bahamas to the United Kingdom
- Karen-Mae Hill, High Commissioner for Antigua and Barbuda to the United Kingdom
- Kevin Isaac, High Commissioner of Saint Kitts and Nevis to the United Kingdom
- Cenio Lewis, High Commissioner of St Vincent & the Grenadines to the United Kingdom
- Therese Rath, High Commissioner of Belize to the United Kingdom
- Patricia Scotland, Baroness Scotland, Secretary-General of the Commonwealth
- Anthony Severin, High Commissioner of Saint Lucia to the United Kingdom
- Joseph Varo, Acting High Commissioner of Papua New Guinea to the United Kingdom
- Lynette Wood, Acting High Commissioner of Australia to the United Kingdom

=== Devolved governments ===
- Mark Drakeford, First Minister of Wales
- Dame Arlene Foster, former First Minister of Northern Ireland
- Alison Johnstone, Presiding Officer of the Scottish Parliament
- Elin Jones, Llywydd of the Senedd
- Peter Robinson, former First Minister of Northern Ireland
- Alex Salmond, former First Minister of Scotland
- Nicola Sturgeon, First Minister of Scotland
- Lord Wallace of Tankerness, former Deputy First Minister of Scotland

=== Judiciary ===
==== Judges of the Court of Appeal of England and Wales ====
- Lord Justice Richard Arnold
- Lord Justice Jonathan Baker
- Lord Justice David Bean
- Lord Justice Colin Birss
- Lady Justice Sue Carr, Baroness Carr of Walton-on-the-Hill
- Lord Justice Peter Coulson
- Lady Justice Nicola Davies
- Lord Justice William Davis
- Lord Justice James Dingemans
- Lord Justice Nicholas Green
- Lord Justice Charles Haddon-Cave
- Lord Justice Timothy Holroyde
- Lady Justice Eleanor King
- Lady Justice Elisabeth Laing
- Lord Justice Clive Lewis
- Lord Justice Kim Lewison
- Lord Justice Keith Lindblom
- Lord Justice Andrew Moylan
- Lord Justice Christopher Nugee
- Lord Justice Stephen Phillips
- Lord Justice Andrew Popplewell
- Lord Justice Rabinder Singh
- Lord Justice Richard Snowden
- Lady Justice Kathryn Thirlwall
- Lord Justice Nicholas Underhill
- Lord Justice Mark Warby
- Lady Justice Philippa Whipple

==== Other ====
- Mary Arden, Lady Arden of Heswall, former justice of the Supreme Court of the United Kingdom
- Dorothy Bain, Lord Advocate (Scotland)
- Sir Scott Baker, former judge of the Court of Appeal of England and Wales
- Michael Briggs, Lord Briggs of Westbourne, justice of the Supreme Court of the United Kingdom
- Colin Sutherland, Lord Carloway, Lord President of the Court of Session (Scotland)
- Lady Justice Leeona Dorrian, Lady Dorrian, Lord Justice Clerk (Scotland)
- Terence Etherton, Baron Etherton, former Master of the Rolls
- Lord Justice Julian Flaux, Chancellor of the High Court
- Patrick Hodge, Lord Hodge, Deputy President of the Supreme Court of the United Kingdom
- Lord Justice Rupert Jackson, former judge of the Court of Appeal of England and Wales
- Sir Francis Jacobs, former Advocate General at the European Court of Justice
- Lady Chief Justice Siobhan Keegan, Lord Chief Justice of Northern Ireland
- David Kitchin, Lord Kitchin, justice of the Supreme Court of the United Kingdom
- Lord Justice George Leggatt, justice of the Supreme Court of the United Kingdom
- Sir Andrew Macfarlane, President of the Family Division
- Nick Phillips, Baron Phillips of Worth Matravers, former President of the Supreme Court of the United Kingdom
- Dame Anne Rafferty, former judge of the Court of Appeal of England and Wales
- Robert Reed, Baron Reed of Allermuir, President of the Supreme Court of the United Kingdom
- Philip Sales, Lord Sales, justice of the Supreme Court of the United Kingdom
- Dame Victoria Sharp, President of the King's Bench Division
- Lady Justice Ingrid Simler, Lady Simler, justice of the Supreme Court of the United Kingdom
- Ben Stephens, Lord Stephens of Creevyloughgare, justice of the Supreme Court of the United Kingdom
- Sir Stephen Tomlinson, former judge of the Court of Appeal of England and Wales
- Sir Geoffrey Vos, Master of the Rolls
- Nicholas Wilson, Lord Wilson of Culworth, former justice of the Supreme Court of the United Kingdom
- Walter Wolffe, former Lord Advocate (Scotland)

=== Politicians ===
- Valerie Amos, Baroness Amos, former leader of the House of Lords
- Catherine Ashton, Baroness Ashton of Upholland, former Lord President of the Council
- Jonathan Ashworth, Labour politician
- Sir Robert Atkins, Conservative politician
- Norman Baker, Liberal Democrat politician
- Stephen Barclay, Conservative politician
- Dame Margaret Beckett, former Foreign Secretary
- Ian Blackford, Leader of the Scottish National Party in the House of Commons
- Baroness Blackstone, Labour politician
- Sir Tony Blair, former Prime Minister of the UK
- Gordon Brown, former prime minister of the UK
- Sir Vince Cable, former Leader of the Liberal Democrats
- David Cameron, former prime minister of the UK
- Menzies Campbell, Lord Campbell of Pittenweem, former Leader of the Liberal Democrats
- Sir Alan Campbell, Labour politician
- Alistair Carmichael, former Secretary of State for Scotland
- Sir Nicholas Clegg, former Deputy Prime Minister of the United Kingdom
- Yvette Cooper, Labour politician
- Ara Darzi, Baron Darzi of Denham, Labour politician
- Sir Edward Davey, Leader of the Liberal Democrats
- Nigel Dodds, Lord Dodds of Duncairn, Democratic Unionist politician
- Sir Jeffrey Donaldson, Leader of the Democratic Unionist Party
- Nigel Evans, Deputy Speaker of the House of Commons
- Vicky Ford, Conservative politician
- George Foulkes, Baron Foulkes of Cumnock, Labour politician
- Susan Garden, Baroness Garden of Frognal, Deputy Speaker of the House of Lords
- Christopher Grayling, former Lord President of the Council
- William Hague, Baron Hague of Richmond former Leader of the Opposition
- Harriet Harman, former Lord Keeper of the Privy Seal
- Alan Haselhurst, Baron Haselhurst, Conservative politician
- John Healey, Labour politician
- James Heappey, Conservative politician
- David Heathcoat-Amory, Conservative politician
- Michael Howard, Baron Howard of Lympne, former Leader of the Opposition
- Sir Lindsay Hoyle, Speaker of the House of Commons
- Boris Johnson, former prime minister
- Sadiq Khan, Mayor of London
- Neil Kinnock, Baron Kinnock, former Leader of the Opposition
- Dame Eleanor Laing, Deputy Speaker of the House of Commons
- David Lammy, Labour politician
- Dame Andrea Leadsom, Conservative politician
- Sir David Lidington, former Chancellor of the Duchy of Lancaster
- John MacGregor, Baron MacGregor of Pulham Market, former Lord President of the Council
- Sir John Major, former prime minister
- Peter Mandelson, Lord Mandelson, former Lord President of the Council
- Theresa May, former prime minister
- Pat McFadden, Labour politician
- John McFall, Baron McFall of Alcluith, Lord Speaker of the House of Lords
- Tom McNally, Baron McNally, Liberal Democrat politician
- Edward Miliband, former Leader of the Opposition
- Andrew Murrison, Conservative politician
- Richard Newby, Baron Newby, Liberal Democrat politician
- Jesse Norman, Conservative politician
- Dominic Raab, former deputy Prime Minister
- Angela Rayner, Deputy Leader of the Labour Party
- Sir Hugh Robertson, Conservative politician
- Janet Royall, Baroness Royall of Blaisdon, Labour politician
- Elizabeth Saville Roberts, Plaid Cymru politician
- Chris Skidmore, Conservative politician
- Sir Iain Duncan Smith, former leader of the opposition
- Angela Smith, Baroness Smith of Basildon, Leader of the Opposition in the Lords
- Mark Spencer, former Lord President of the Council
- Sir Keir Starmer, Leader of the Opposition
- Melvyn Stride, Conservative politician
- Graham Stuart, Conservative politician
- Sir Desmond Swayne, Conservative politician.
- Ann Taylor, Baroness Taylor of Bolton, former Lord President of the Council
- Nicklaus Thomas-Symonds, Labour politician
- Emily Thornberry, Labour politician
- Thomas Tugendhat, Conservative politician
- Theresa Villiers, Conservative politician
- John Wakeham, Baron Wakeham, former Lord President of the Council
- Dame Rosie Winterton, Deputy Speaker of the House of Commons

=== Religious leaders ===
- George Carey, Baron Carey of Clifton, former archbishop of Canterbury
- Richard Chartres, Baron Chartres, former bishop of London
- David Hope, Baron Hope of Thornes, former archbishop of York
- Dame Sarah Mullally, Bishop of London
- John Sentamu, Baron Sentamu, former archbishop of York
- Rowan Williams, Baron Williams of Oystermouth, former archbishop of Canterbury

=== Royal household ===
- Sir Clive Alderton, Private Secretary to the Sovereign
- Rupert Carington, 7th Baron Carrington, Lord Great Chamberlain
- Alistair Harrison, Marshal of the Diplomatic Corps
- Vice-Admiral Sir Tony Johnstone-Burt, Master of the Household
- Joseph Morrow, Lord Lyon King of Arms
- Andrew Parker, Baron Parker of Minsmere, Lord Chamberlain of the Household
- David White, Garter Principal King of Arms
- Sir Edward Young, Private Secretary to the Sovereign

== See also ==
- List of guests at the coronation of Charles III and Camilla
