= Colin Derrick =

Politician in Antigua and Barbuda

Member of the Senate of Antigua and Barbuda
- In office 23 March 2004 – 26 April 2014; Government senator

Personal details
- Party: United Progressive Party

Colin V. A. Derrick is a United Progressive Party politician, who was appointed to the Senate of Antigua and Barbuda for the government on 23 March 2004.

== Early life and education ==
Colin V. A. Derrick was educated abroad and graduated from the Middle Temple Inn in the United Kingdom with a Bachelor of Laws (LLB) and a Barrister-at-Law.

== Career ==
He works as an attorney. Derrick is a founding member of UPP. He played a key role in uniting three political parties into a coalition that would ultimately end decades of power by the Antigua Barbuda Labour Party.

He was a UPP candidate in the 1999, 2004, 2009 and 2014 general elections for the St. John's City West constituency but ran always unsuccessfully against ABLP candidate Gaston Browne.

He served as determined and respected senator from 2004 to 2009.

He was appointed Minister of Social Transformation (2004-2005), Minister of justice (2005-2007), Minister of Justice and Public Safety (2007-2009) and Minister of State in the Ministry of National Security (2009-2014).

On 9 January 2020 Derrick was appointed by the Government of Gaston Browne as chairman of the Public Service Board of Appeal.

== Personal life ==
Derrick is a member of the Harmonites International Steel Orchestra, the Spring Gardens Moravian Church, the Antigua and Barbuda Cricket Association, and the Antigua and Barbuda Bar Association. He has two children, Zahra and Kareem Derrick, and is married to Maureen, a Grenada native.

== See also ==
- Gaston Browne
- Ronald Sanders
- Walton Alfonso Webson
- Antigua.news
