= Claudius Cornelius Thomas =

Eastern Caribbean ciplomat (1928–1987)

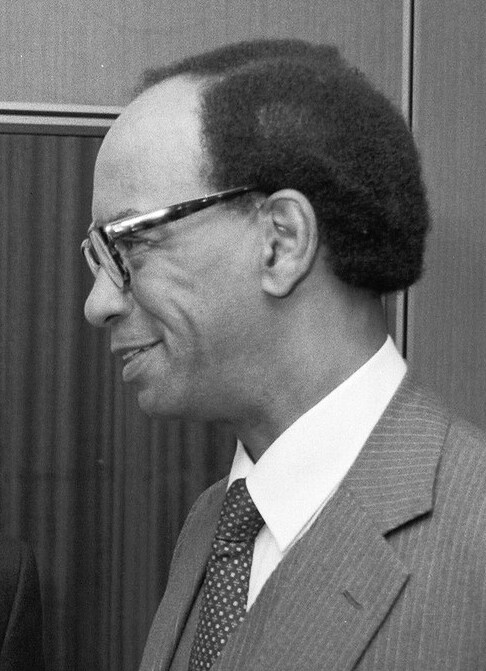

Commissioner for the Eastern Caribbean Governments in the United Kingdom
- In office 1975–1981

High Commissioner for St. Vincent and the Grenadines to the United Kingdom
- In office 27 October 1979 – 1983
- Succeeded by: 1984-2001: Carlyle Dougan Queen's Counsel; Cenio Elwin Lewis

High Commissioner for Antigua and Barbuda to the United Kingdom
- In office 1981–1983
- Succeeded by: Ronald Sanders

High Commissioner for Saint Kitts and Nevis to the United Kingdom
- In office 1983–1985
- Succeeded by: 12 January 2011: Kevin Isaac

Personal details
- Born: 1 October 1928
- Died: 6 April 1987 (aged 58)
- Parents: Charles Malin Thomas (father); Ada Thomas (nee Dyer) (mother)
- Education: Castries Intermediate School
- Alma mater: Gray's Inn, London: Barrister-at-Law; Bachelor of Laws University of London; Doctorat en Droit of the University of Strasbourg

Claudius Cornelius Thomas (1 October 1928 – 8 April 1987) was an Eastern Caribbean diplomat.

== Career ==
- From 1961 to 1962 he was Cadet Officer at the Commission for the West Indies in London.
- In 1962 he was translator at the European Economic Community in Brussels.
- From 1962 to 1963 he was Attaché to the International Institute of Administrative Sciences
- From 1963 to 1972 he was Wissenschaftlicher Assistent at the Free University of Berlin
- From 1972 to 1975 he was Assistant professor of International and Comparative law at the Free University of Berlin.
- Beginning in 1975 he was Commissioner for the Eastern Caribbean Governments in London.
- In 1979 he was commissioned as High Commissioner for St. Vincent and the Grenadines in London.
- In 1981 he was commissioned as High Commissioner for Antigua and Barbuda in London.
- In 1983 he was commissioned as High Commissioner for Saint Kitts and Nevis in London.
- From 21 February 1984 to 21 February 1994 he was Ambassador of the Organisation of Eastern Caribbean States to the European Union.

== See also ==
- Carl Roberts (diplomat)
- Antigua.news
