= List of ambassadors of Antigua and Barbuda to the United States =

Coordinates: 38.933208°N 77.085918°W

Ambassador of Antigua and Barbuda to United States
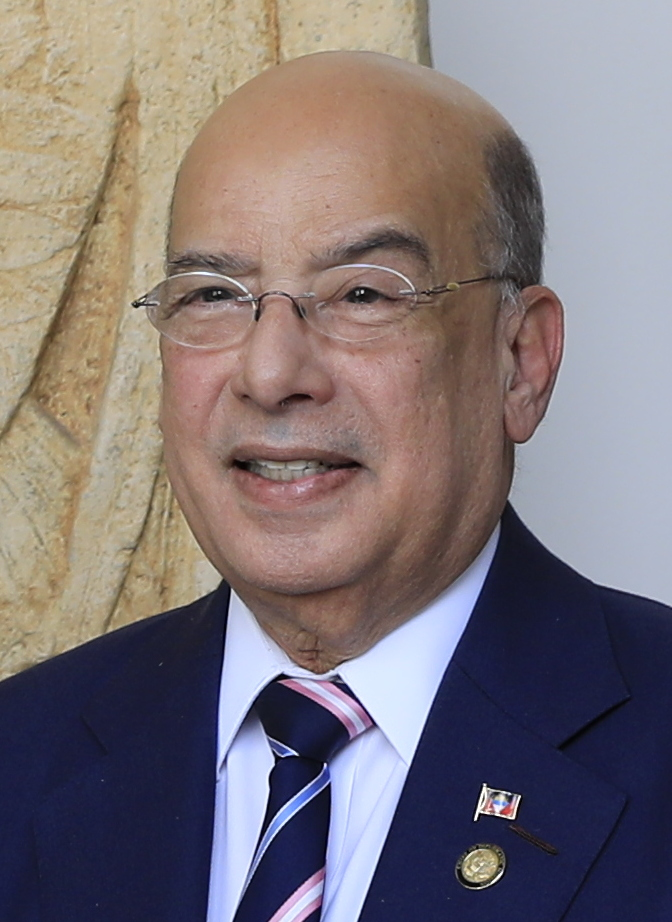
- Incumbent; Sir Ronald Sanders since September 17, 2015
- Inaugural holder: Edmund Hawkins Lake
- Formation: April 12, 1982

The Antiguan Barbudan ambassador in Washington, D. C. is the official representative of the Government in St. John's, Antigua and Barbuda to the Government of the United States and Permanent Representative to the Organization of American States.

== List of representatives ==
Diplomatic agrément	Diplomatic accreditation	Ambassador	Observations	Prime Minister of Antigua and Barbuda	List of presidents of the United States	Term end
March 31, 1982	April 12, 1982	Edmund Hawkins Lake	(St. John's City, South) Since October 30, 1982 OBE, 1982 to 1990: Permanent Representative and Chairman of the Permanent Council of the OAS	Vere Cornwall Bird	Ronald Reagan	
June 17, 1991	August 6, 1991	Patrick Albert Lewis	(Born 27 November 1938 in St. John's, Antigua) married two children, 1991-1994 Washington 1994- 2004 Permanent Representative next the Headquarters of the United Nations, 2003: minister of state of Antigua and Barbados	Vere Cornwall Bird	George H. W. Bush	
May 22, 1996	July 29, 1996	Lionel Alexander Hurst		Lester Bird	Bill Clinton	
March 4, 2005	March 8, 2005	Deborah-Mae Lovell	1. November 2010: Order of the Nation (Antigua and Barbuda) : Dame Commander of the Most Distinguished Order of the Nation – DCN	Winston Baldwin Spencer	George W. Bush	
August 6, 2015	September 17, 2015	Sir Ronald Sanders		Gaston Browne	Barack Obama	

- Antigua and Barbuda–United States relations
