= Skerritt =

Skerritt is an Irish surname of Norman origin and was one of 14 members of the Tribes of Galway a group of merchant families that dominated the city during the Middle Ages. Notable people with the surname include:

- Anton Skerritt (born 1964), Trinidadian/Canadian sprinter and soccer player
- Ellen Skerritt (born 1994), Australian racing cyclist
- Paddy Skerritt (1926–2001), Irish golfer
- Ricky Skerritt (born 1956), Saint Kitts and Nevis politician
- Tom Skerritt (born 1933), American actor

== See also ==
- Shirley Skerrit-Andrew, Saint Kitts economist and diploma
- Skerrit
