= Carl Roberts (diplomat) =

Antiguan and Barbudan diplomat

Carl Bertrand Westerby Roberts

High Commissioner for Antigua and Barbuda to the United Kingdom
- In office October 3, 2004 – 2014
- Preceded by: Ronald Sanders (diplomat)
- Succeeded by: Althea Allison Vanderpoole Banahene

Personal details
- Born: October 13, 1948 (age 77) St. John's, Antigua and Barbuda
- Spouse: m 1974, Pauline Margaret A.
- Education: Antigua Grammar School
- Alma mater: 1982: Bachelor of Engineering Hons magna cum laude of the Northeastern University Boston; 1995 Master of Business Administration of the University of the West Indies, Barbados.; 2004: Doctor of Business Administration of the University of Bradford.

Carl Bertrand Westerby Roberts CMG (born October 13, 1948) was an Antiguan and Barbudan diplomat and was the former High Commissioner of Antigua and Barbuda to the United Kingdom, with concurrent accreditations as Ambassador of Antigua and Barbuda to France, Germany, Italy and Spain.

== Career ==
- In 1967 he joined the Cable & Wireless (WI) Ltd.
- From 1995 to 1997 he was General Manager of Cable & Wireless (WI) Ltd. in Montserrat.
- From 1997 to 2002 he was Chief Executive of Cable & Wireless (WI) Ltd. in Dominica.
- From 2002 to 2004 he was Chief Executive of Cable & Wireless (WI) Ltd. in Saint Kitts and Nevis.
- On October 3, 2004 he was commissioned High Commissioner to London.
- On 8 December 2004 Roberts presented his Letters of Credence to Queen Elizabeth II.
- From 2004 to 2014 he was High Commissioner to London and concurrently Ambassador to Berlin, Madrid, Moscow, Rome, Paris, where he was Permanent Representative to the UNESCO and in Geneva he was Deputy Permanent Representative to the World Trade Organization.
- In the 2012 New Year Honours, Roberts was appointed Companion of the Order of St Michael and St George (CMG)

== See also ==
- Claudius Cornelius Thomas
- Karen-Mae Hill
- Walton Alfonso Webson
