= Yamina Karitanyi =

Yamina Claris Karitsnyi is the High Commissioner to the United Kingdom from Rwanda and non-resident Ambassador to Ireland. She presented her credentials January 9, 2016.

== Career ==
Before being posted in London, Karitanyi was in charge of the Tourism and Conservation portfolios at the Rwanda Development Board (RDB). She became High Commissioner to Kenya in 2012.

== Biography ==
From Buffalo State College in New York, in 1998 Karitanyi earned a Bachelor of Science Degree in Business Studies. Her MBA is from the Rochester Institute of Technology.
