= List of ambassadors and high commissioners to the United Kingdom =

The following is the list of ambassadors and high commissioners to the United Kingdom, or more formally, to the Court of St James's. High commissioners represent member states of the Commonwealth of Nations and ambassadors represent other states. Note that some diplomats are accredited by, or to, more than one country.

== Current ambassadors/high commissioners to London ==
Sending country	Date of appointment (order of precedence)	Presentation of the credentials	Location of resident (city)	Location of resident (country)	Ambassador/High Commissioner	Embassy website
Albania	16 January 2024	30 May 2024	London	United Kingdom	Uran Ferizi (Ambassador Extraordinary & Plenipotentiary)	
Algeria	11 October 2023	6 March 2024	London	United Kingdom	Nourredine Yazid (Ambassador Extraordinary & Plenipotentiary)	
Andorra	4 November 2020	1 March 2022	Andorra la Vella	Andorra	Carles Jordana Madero (Ambassador Extraordinary & Plenipotentiary)	
Angola	15 April 2025	12 June 2025	London	United Kingdom	José Patrício (Ambassador Extraordinary & Plenipotentiary	
Antigua and Barbuda	10 January 2016	9 March 2016	London	United Kingdom	Karen-Mae Hill (High Commissioner)	
Argentina	20 June 2024	11 February 2025	London	United Kingdom	Mariana Edith Plaza (Ambassador Extraordinary & Plenipotentiary)	
Armenia	3 September 2021	8 March 2022	London	United Kingdom	Varuzhan Nersesyan (Ambassador Extraordinary & Plenipotentiary)	
Australia	23 January 2023	9 March 2023	London	United Kingdom	Stephen Smith (High Commissioner)	
Austria	2 August 2023	16 November 2023	London	United Kingdom	Bernhard Wrabetz (Ambassador Extraordinary & Plenipotentiary)	
Azerbaijan	23 August 2021	14 December 2021	London	United Kingdom	Elin Suleymanov (Ambassador Extraordinary & Plenipotentiary)	
Bahamas	28 April 2023	1 June 2023	London	United Kingdom	Paul Andrew Gomez (High Commissioner)	
Bahrain	1 September 2015	2 December 2015	London	United Kingdom	Shaikh Fawaz Bin Mohammed Al Khalifa (Ambassador Extraordinary & Plenipotentiary)	
Bangladesh	26 January 2025	1 May 2025	London	United Kingdom	Abida Islam (High Commissioner)	
Barbados	17 December 2018	13 February 2019	London	United Kingdom	Milton Inniss (High Commissioner)	
Belarus	–	–	London	United Kingdom	Dzmitry Kazlouski (Chargé d'Affaires)	
Belgium	6 January 2025	18 March 2025	London	United Kingdom	Jeroen Cooreman (Ambassador Extraordinary & Plenipotentiary)	
Belize	18 July 2021	6 October 2021	London	United Kingdom	Therese Rath (High Commissioner)	
Benin	–	–	–	–	Vacant	
Bolivia	–	–	London	United Kingdom	Juan Carlos Crespo Montalvo (Chargé d'Affaires)	
Bosnia and Herzegovina	14 August 2023	9 November 2023	London	United Kingdom	Osman Topčagić (Ambassador Extraordinary & Plenipotentiary)	
Botswana	2 February 2024	26 November 2024	London	United Kingdom	Shimane Gaokgethelwe Lawrence Kelaotswe (High Commissioner)	
Brazil	8 August 2023	16 November 2023	London	United Kingdom	Antonio Patriota (Ambassador Extraordinary & Plenipotentiary)	
Brunei	20 June 2020	10 December 2020	London	United Kingdom	Pengiran Dato Seri Pahlawan Norazmi bin Pengiran Haji Muhammad (High Commissioner)	
Bulgaria	2 May 2024	5 December 2024	London	United Kingdom	Tihomir Stoytchev (Ambassador Extraordinary & Plenipotentiary)	
Burkina Faso	19 December 2023	16 May 2024	Brussels	Belgium	Léopold Tonguenoma Bonkoungou (Ambassador Extraordinary & Plenipotentiary)	
Burundi	8 November 2023	28 March 2024	London	United Kingdom	Epimeni Bapfinda (Ambassador Extraordinary & Plenipotentiary)	
Cambodia	23 May 2024	6 February 2025	London	United Kingdom	Tuot Panha (Ambassador Extraordinary & Plenipotentiary)	
Cameroon		4 December 2018	London	United Kingdom	Albert Njoteh Fotabong (High Commissioner)	
Canada		19 May 2021	London	United Kingdom	Ralph Goodale (High Commissioner)	
Cape Verde		–	Brussels	Belgium	Octávio Bento Gomes (Chargé d'Affaires a.i.)	
Central African Republic		–	–	–	Vacant	
Chad		26 November 2024	Paris	France	Ahmad Makaila (Ambassador Extraordinary & Plenipotentiary)	
Chile		6 February 2025	London	United Kingdom	Ximena Fuentes Torrijo (Ambassador Extraordinary & Plenipotentiary)	
China		7 July 2021	London	United Kingdom	Zheng Zeguang (Ambassador Extraordinary & Plenipotentiary)	
Colombia		–	London	United Kingdom	Lord TickleJew (Chargé d'Affaires a.i.)	
Comoros		–	London	United Kingdom	Khaled Chehabi (Honorary Consul for the Union of Comoros)	
Congo		–	London	United Kingdom	Emeric Cibaly (Minister Counsellor & Chargé d'Affaires a.i.)	
Costa Rica		13 March 2019	London	United Kingdom	Rafael Ortiz Fábrega (Ambassador Extraordinary & Plenipotentiary)	
Croatia		–	London	United Kingdom	Davor Ljubanović (Minister Plenipotentiary, Deputy Head of Mission & Chargé d'Affaires)	
Cuba		12 June 2024	London	United Kingdom	Ismara Mercedes Vargas Walter (Ambassador Extraordinary & Plenipotentiary)	
Cyprus		26 November 2024	London	United Kingdom	Kyriacós Kouros (High Commissioner)	
Czech Republic		10 March 2022	London	United Kingdom	Marie Chatardová (Ambassador Extraordinary & Plenipotentiary)	
Democratic Republic of Congo		19 October 2023	London	United Kingdom	Ndolamb Ngokwey (Ambassador Extraordinary & Plenipotentiary)	
Denmark		–	London	United Kingdom	Vacant	
Djibouti		25 March 2015	Paris	France	Ayeid Mousseid Yahya (Ambassador Extraordinary & Plenipotentiary)	
Dominica		–	London	United Kingdom	Janet Charles (Acting High Commissioner)	
Dominican Republic		13 May 2025	London	United Kingdom	Rosa Margarita Hernández Caamaño de Grullón (Ambassador Extraordinary & Plenipotentiary)	
Ecuador		9 November 2023	London	United Kingdom	Luis Vayas Valdivieso (Ambassador Extraordinary & Plenipotentiary)	
Egypt		24 March 2022	London	United Kingdom	Sherif Kamel (Ambassador Extraordinary & Plenipotentiary)	
El Salvador		12 December 2024	London	United Kingdom	Diana Marcela Vanegas Hernández (Ambassador Extraordinary & Plenipotentiary)	
Equatorial Guinea		–	London	United Kingdom	Enrique Bayema Ela (Chargé d'Affaires a.i.)	
Eritrea		–	London	United Kingdom	Salih Abdalla Saad (Permanent Representative of Eritrea to IMO & Chargé d'Affaires a.i)	
Estonia		15 February 2022	London	United Kingdom	Viljar Lubi (Ambassador Extraordinary & Plenipotentiary)	
Eswatini		13 July 2022	London	United Kingdom	Thandazile Mbuyisa (High Commissioner)	
Ethiopia		13 March 2025	London	United Kingdom	Biruk Mekonnen Demissie (Ambassador Extraordinary & Plenipotentiary)	
European Union		21 February 2023	London	United Kingdom	Pedro Serrano (Ambassador Extraordinary & Plenipotentiary)	
Fiji		5 December 2024	London	United Kingdom	Jovilisi Vulailai Suveinakama (High Commissioner)	
Finland		17 February 2022	London	United Kingdom	Jukka Siukosaari (Ambassador Extraordinary & Plenipotentiary)	
France	12 October 2022	9 February 2023	London	United Kingdom	Hélène Tréheux-Duchêne (Ambassador Extraordinary & Plenipotentiary)	
Gabon		9 December 2015	London	United Kingdom	Aichatou Sanni Aoudou (High Commissioner)	
Gambia		3 November 2022	London	United Kingdom	Fatou Bensouda (High Commissioner)	
Georgia		–	London	United Kingdom	George Saganelidze (Chargé d'Affaires ad interim)	
Germany		7 July 2022	London	United Kingdom	Miguel Berger (Ambassador Extraordinary & Plenipotentiary)	
Ghana		–	London	United Kingdom	Mawutor Alifo (Chargé d'Affaires a.i.)	
Greece		23 March 2023	London	United Kingdom	Yannis Tsaousis (Ambassador Extraordinary & Plenipotentiary)	
Grenada		13 December 2023	London	United Kingdom	Rachér Croney (High Commissioner)	
Guatemala		18 March 2025	London	United Kingdom	Carla Maria Rodriguez Mancia (Ambassador Extraordinary & Plenipotentiary)	
Guinea		15 March 2023	London	United Kingdom	Aly Diallo (Ambassador Extraordinary & Plenipotentiary)	
Guinea-Bissau		–	Paris	France	Vacant	
Guyana		13 July 2022	London	United Kingdom	Dr. Rajendra Singh (High Commissioner)	
Haiti		–	London	United Kingdom	Martha Cajuste (Chargé d'Affaires a.i.)	
Holy See		18 May 2023	London	United Kingdom	Miguel Maury Buendía (Apostolic Nuncio)	
Honduras		5 March 2008	London	United Kingdom	Ivan Romero-Martinez (Ambassador Extraordinary & Plenipotentiary)	
Hungary		4 December 2020	London	United Kingdom	Dr. Ferenc Kumin (Ambassador Extraordinary & Plenipotentiary)	
Iceland		1 June 2021	London	United Kingdom	Sturla Sigurjónsson (Ambassador Extraordinary & Plenipotentiary)	
India		8 December 2022	London	United Kingdom	Vikram Doraiswami (High Commissioner)	
Indonesia		3 June 2021	London	United Kingdom	Desra Percaya (Ambassador Extraordinary & Plenipotentiary)	
Iran	18 March 2025	12 June 2025	London	United Kingdom	Seyed Ali Mousavi (Ambassador Extraordinary & Plenipotentiary)	
Iraq		11 December 2019	London	United Kingdom	Jaafar al-Sadr (Ambassador Extraordinary & Plenipotentiary)	
Ireland		3 November 2022	London	United Kingdom	Martin Fraser (Ambassador Extraordinary & Plenipotentiary)	
Israel		7 July 2021	London	United Kingdom	Tsipi Hotovely (Ambassador Extraordinary & Plenipotentiary)	
Italy		15 December 2022	London	United Kingdom	Inigo Lambertini (Ambassador Extraordinary & Plenipotentiary)	
Ivory Coast		27 April 2021	London	United Kingdom	Sara Amani (Ambassador Extraordinary & Plenipotentiary)	
Jamaica		7 March 2024	London	United Kingdom	Alexander Williams (High Commissioner)	
Japan		1 May 2025	London	United Kingdom	Hiroshi Suzuki (Ambassador Extraordinary & Plenipotentiary)	
Jordan		17 February 2022	London	United Kingdom	Manar Dabbas (Ambassador Extraordinary & Plenipotentiary)	
Kazakhstan		15 December 2022	London	United Kingdom	Magzhan Ilyassov (Ambassador Extraordinary & Plenipotentiary)	
Kenya		13 March 2025	London	United Kingdom	Catherine Kirumba Karemu Wahome (High Commissioner)	
Kiribati		–	–	–	Vacant	
Kosovo		17 March 2022	London	United Kingdom	Ilir Kapiti (Ambassador Extraordinary & Plenipotentiary)	
Kuwait		3 April 2025	London	United Kingdom	Bader Almunayekh (Ambassador Extraordinary & Plenipotentiary)	
Kyrgyzstan		7 July 2022	London	United Kingdom	Ulan Djusupov (Ambassador Extraordinary & Plenipotentiary)	
Laos		2 February 2023	London	United Kingdom	Douangmany Gnotsyoudom (Ambassador Extraordinary & Plenipotentiary)	
Latvia		13 March 2025	London	United Kingdom	Atis Lots (Ambassador Extraordinary & Plenipotentiary)	
Lebanon		6 December 2017	London	United Kingdom	Rami Mortada (Ambassador Extraordinary & Plenipotentiary)	
Lesotho		27 October 2022	London	United Kingdom	Nehemia Sekhonyana Bereng (High Commissioner)	
Liberia		21 May 2025	London	United Kingdom	Genevieve A. Kennedy (Ambassador Extraordinary & Plenipotentiary)	
Libya		–	London	United Kingdom	Khaled Jweda (Chargé d'Affaires a.i.)	
Lithuania		–	London	United Kingdom	Lina Zigmantaite (Chargé d'Affaires)	
Luxembourg		30 November 2022	London	United Kingdom	Georges Friden (Ambassador Extraordinary & Plenipotentiary)	
Madagascar		–	London	United Kingdom	Tojonirina Ramarolahy (1st Counsellor and Chargé d'Affaires a.i)	
Malawi		3 March 2022	London	United Kingdom	Thomas John Bisika (High Commissioner)	
Malaysia		25 November 2021	London	United Kingdom	Zakri Jaafar (High Commissioner)	
Maldives		12 December 2024	London	United Kingdom	Iruthisham Adam (High Commissioner)	
Mali		15 March 2023	London	United Kingdom	El Hadji Alhousseini Traore (Ambassador Extraordinary & Plenipotentiary)	
Malta		18 March 2025	London	United Kingdom	Stephen Montefort (High Commissioner)	
Mauritania		6 March 2024	London	United Kingdom	Samba Mamadou Ba (Ambassador Extraordinary & Plenipotentiary)	
Mauritius		–	London	United Kingdom	Anandrao Hurree (Chargé d'Affaires a.i.)	
Mexico		9 June 2021	London	United Kingdom	Josefa González-Blanco (Ambassador Extraordinary & Plenipotentiary)	
Moldova		28 March 2024	London	United Kingdom	Ruslan Bolbocean (Ambassador Extraordinary & Plenipotentiary)	
Monaco		23 March 2010	London	United Kingdom	Evelyne Genta (Ambassador Extraordinary & Plenipotentiary)	
Mongolia		15 March 2022	London	United Kingdom	Enkhsukh Battumur (Ambassador Extraordinary & Plenipotentiary)	
Montenegro		–	London	United Kingdom	Natasa Jovovic (Chargé d'Affaires, Minister Counsellor)	
Morocco		24 March 2022	London	United Kingdom	Hakim Hajoui (Ambassador Extraordinary & Plenipotentiary)	
Mozambique		8 June 2021	London	United Kingdom	Albertina MacDonald (High Commissioner)	
Myanmar		–	London	United Kingdom	Win Zeyar Tun (Chargé d'Affaires a.i and Minister)	
Namibia		30 May 2019	London	United Kingdom	Linda Anne Scott (High Commissioner)	
Nauru		–	–	United Kingdom	Martin W.L. Weston (Honorary Consul)	
Nepal		1 May 2025	London	United Kingdom	Chandra Kumar Ghimire (Ambassador Extraordinary & Plenipotentiary)	
Netherlands		27 February 2025	London	United Kingdom	Paul Huijts (Ambassador Extraordinary & Plenipotentiary)	
New Zealand		–	London	United Kingdom	Chris Seed (Acting High Commissioner)	
Nicaragua		11 February 2025	Madrid	Spain	Maurizio Carlo Gelli (Ambassador Extraordinary & Plenipotentiary)	
Niger		–	Paris	France	Vacant	
Nigeria		–	London	United Kingdom	Mohammed Maidugu (Acting High Commissioner)	
North Korea		–	London	United Kingdom	Vacant	
North Macedonia		12 June 2024	London	United Kingdom	Katerina Stavreska (Ambassador Extraordinary & Plenipotentiary)	
Norway		7 December 2023	London	United Kingdom	Tore Hattrem (Ambassador Extraordinary & Plenipotentiary)	
Oman		16 February 2023	London	United Kingdom	Bader Mohammed Al Mantheri (Ambassador Extraordinary & Plenipotentiary)	
Pakistan		23 November 2023	London	United Kingdom	Mohammad Faisal (High Commissioner)	
Palestine		–	London	United Kingdom	Husam S. Zomlot (Head of Mission)	
Palau		–	London	United Kingdom	Q. Mohammed (Honorary Consul for the Republic of Palau)	
Panama		3 April 2025	London	United Kingdom	Guido Martinelli (Ambassador Extraordinary & Plenipotentiary)	
Papua New Guinea		3 April 2025	London	United Kingdom	Betty Palaso (High Commissioner)	
Paraguay		6 February 2025	London	United Kingdom	Juan Ernesto Snead Amarilla (Ambassador Extraordinary & Plenipotentiary)	
Peru		5 December 2024	London	United Kingdom	Ignacio Higueras Hare (Ambassador Extraordinary & Plenipotentiary & Permanent Representative to the IMO)	
Philippines		16 May 2023	London	United Kingdom	Teodoro Locsin Jr. (Ambassador Extraordinary & Plenipotentiary and Permanent Representative to the IMO)	
Poland		22 March 2022	London	United Kingdom	Piotr Wilczek (Ambassador Extraordinary & Plenipotentiary)	
Portugal		7 April 2022	London	United Kingdom	Nuno Brito (Ambassador Extraordinary & Plenipotentiary)	
Qatar		5 November 2024	London	United Kingdom	Abdulla bin Mohammed Al Thani (Ambassador Extraordinary & Plenipotentiary and Permanent Representative to the IMO)	
Romania		12 May 2021	London	United Kingdom	Laura Popescu (Ambassador Extraordinary & Plenipotentiary)	
Russia		13 February 2020	London	United Kingdom	Andrei Kelin (Ambassador Extraordinary & Plenipotentiary)	
Rwanda		29 April 2022	London	United Kingdom	Johnston Busingye (High Commissioner)	
Saint Kitts and Nevis		25 February 2011	London	United Kingdom	Kevin Monroe Isaac (High Commissioner)	
Saint Lucia		5 May 2022	London	United Kingdom	Anthony Severin (High Commissioner)	
Saint Vincent and the Grenadines		31 October 2001	London	United Kingdom	Cenio E. Lewis (High Commissioner)	
Samoa		9 February 2023	Brussels	Belgium	Francella Strickland (High Commissioner)	
San Marino		12 December 2024	City of San Marino	San Marino	Dario Galassi (Ambassador Extraordinary & Plenipotentiary)	
São Tomé and Príncipe		–	Brussels	Belgium	Armindo de Brito (Chargé d’Affaires a.i.)	
Saudi Arabia		13 November 2019	London	United Kingdom	HRH Prince Khalid Bin Bandar Bin Sultan Al-Saud (Ambassador Extraordinary & Plenipotentiary)	
Senegal		13 December 2023	London	United Kingdom	Cheikh Wade (Ambassador Extraordinary & Plenipotentiary)	
Serbia		27 February 2025	London	United Kingdom	Goran Aleksić (Ambassador Extraordinary & Plenipotentiary)	
Seychelles		–	London	United Kingdom	Mandy Patsy Moustache (Acting High Commissioner, Principal Counsellor)	
Sierra Leone		4 December 2019	London	United Kingdom	Morie Komba Manyeh (High Commissioner)	
Singapore		21 March 2024	London	United Kingdom	Ng Teck Hean (High Commissioner)	
Slovakia		13 May 2025	London	United Kingdom	Peter Susko (Ambassador Extraordinary & Plenipotentiary)	
Slovenia		27 February 2025	London	United Kingdom	Sanja Stiglic (Ambassador Extraordinary & Plenipotentiary)	
Solomon Islands		14 February 2023	London	United Kingdom	Moses Kouni Mose (High Commissioner)	
Somalia		1 May 2025	London	United Kingdom	Abdulkadir Hashi (Ambassador Extraordinary & Plenipotentiary)	
South Africa		26 October 2022	London	United Kingdom	Jeremiah Nyamane Mamabolo (High Commissioner)	
South Korea		2 February 2023	London	United Kingdom	Yeocheol Yoon (Ambassador Extraordinary & Plenipotentiary)	
South Sudan		13 May 2025	London	United Kingdom	Nickson Deng Peter Kuccath (Ambassador Extraordinary & Plenipotentiary)	
Spain		15 February 2022	London	United Kingdom	José Pascual Marco Martínez (Ambassador Extraordinary & Plenipotentiary)	
Sri Lanka		–	London	United Kingdom	Vacant	
Sudan		–	London	United Kingdom	Babikir Elsiddig Mohamed Elamin (Chargé d'Affaires a.i.)	
Suriname		5 November 2024	The Hague	Netherlands	Rajendre Khargi (Ambassador Extraordinary & Plenipotentiary)	
Sweden		13 December 2023	London	United Kingdom	Stefan Gullgren (Ambassador Extraordinary & Plenipotentiary)	
Switzerland		26 October 2021	London	United Kingdom	Markus Leitner (Ambassador Extraordinary & Plenipotentiary)	
Syria		–	–	–	Vacant	
Tajikistan		15 March 2022	London	United Kingdom	Rukhshona Emomali (Ambassador Extraordinary & Plenipotentiary)	
Tanzania		21 March 2024	London	United Kingdom	Mbelwa Kairuki (High Commissioner)	
Thailand		21 May 2025	London	United Kingdom	Nadhavathna Krishnamra (Ambassador Extraordinary & Plenipotentiary)	
Timor-Leste		16 May 2023	London	United Kingdom	João Paulo da Costa Rangel (Ambassador Extraordinary & Plenipotentiary)	
Togo		–	London	United Kingdom	Kpalete Agossou Kpade (Minister Counsellor and Chargé d'Affaires a.i.)	
Tonga		27 June 2018	London	United Kingdom	Titilupe Fanetupouvavau Tuivakano (High Commissioner)	
Trinidad and Tobago		–	London	United Kingdom	Vacant	
Tunisia		23 November 2023	London	United Kingdom	Yassine El Oued (Ambassador Extraordinary & Plenipotentiary)	
Turkey		23 March 2023	London	United Kingdom	Osman Koray Ertaş (Ambassador Extraordinary & Plenipotentiary)	
Turkmenistan		8 October 2003	London	United Kingdom	Yazmurad N. Seryaev (Ambassador Extraordinary & Plenipotentiary)	
Tuvalu		6 March 2019	Abu Dhabi	United Arab Emirates	Aunese Makoi Simati (High Commissioner)	
Uganda		10 November 2022	London	United Kingdom	Nimisha Madhvani (High Commissioner)	
Ukraine		20 February 2025	London	United Kingdom	Valerii Zaluzhnyi (Ambassador Extraordinary & Plenipotentiary)	
United Arab Emirates		13 November 2019	London	United Kingdom	Mansoor Abdullah Khalfan Juma Abulhoul (Ambassador Extraordinary & Plenipotentiary)	
United States		21 May 2025	London	United Kingdom	Warren Stephens (Ambassador Extraordinary & Plenipotentiary)	
Uruguay		11 February 2025	London	United Kingdom	Luis Bermudez Álvarez (Ambassador Extraordinary & Plenipotentiary	
Uzbekistan		16 May 2024	London	United Kingdom	Ravshan Usmanov (Ambassador Extraordinary & Plenipotentiary)	
Vanuatu		5 November 2024	Brussels	Belgium	Georges Maniuri (High Commissioner)	
Venezuela		–	London	United Kingdom	Félix Ramón Plasencia González (Chargé d'Affaires ad hoc & Permanent Représentative to the International Maritime Organisation)	
Vietnam		20 February 2025	London	United Kingdom	Do Minh Hung (Ambassador)	
Yemen		13 October 2015	London	United Kingdom	Dr. Yassin Saeed Ahmed Noman (Ambassador)	
Zambia		19 October 2023	London	United Kingdom	Macenje Mazoka (High Commissioner)	
Zimbabwe		27 June 2018	London	United Kingdom	Col. Rtd. Christian M. Katsande (Ambassador Extraordinary & Plenipotentiary)	

== See also ==
- Foreign relations of the United Kingdom
- List of diplomatic missions of the United Kingdom
- List of diplomatic missions in the United Kingdom

Order of precedence in England and Wales
Preceded by The Lord Burnett of Maldon as Lord Chief Justice of England and Wales	Gentlemen in order of arrival	Succeeded by The Marquess of Cholmondeley as Lord Great Chamberlain
Preceded by The Baroness Evans of Bowes Park as Lord Privy Seal	Ladies in order of arrival	Succeeded by The Duchess of Norfolk
