= Antigua and Barbuda–United States relations =

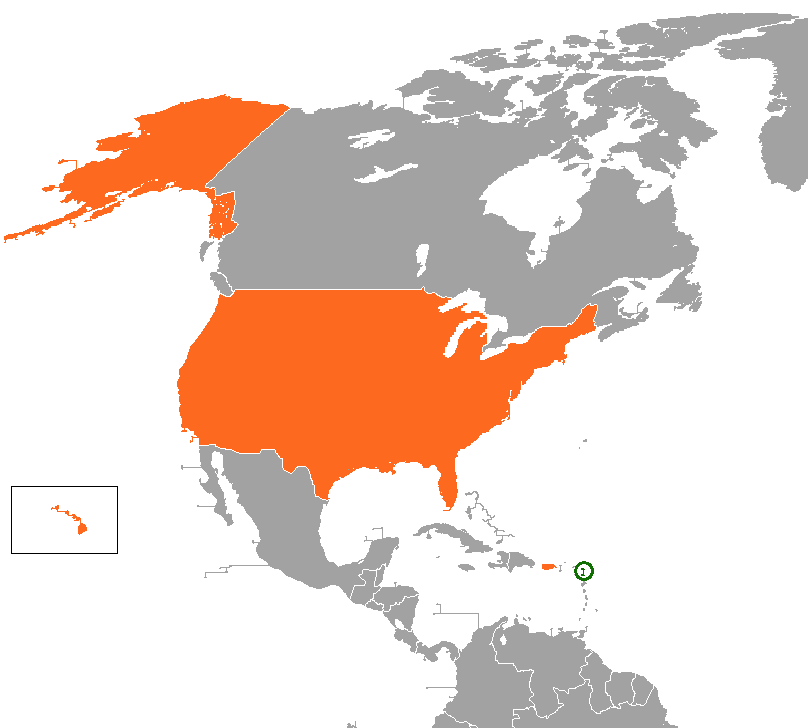

- Antigua and Barbuda: United States

Envoy
- Antiguan and Barbudan Ambassador to the United States Sir Ronald Sanders: "Chargé d'affaires" Karin B. Sullivan

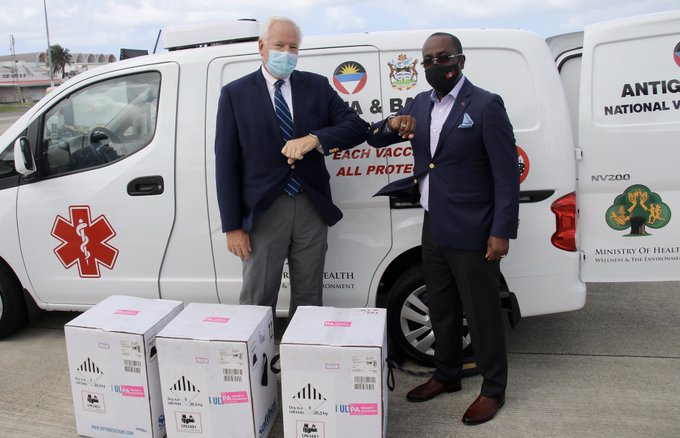
The US delivers coronavirus vaccines to Antigua and Barbuda as part of the COVAX program in 2021

Relations between Antigua and Barbuda and the United States have been friendly since Antigua and Barbuda's independence from the United Kingdom in 1981.

The United States has supported the government of Antigua and Barbuda's effort to expand its economic base and to improve its citizens' standard of living. However, concerns over the lack of adequate regulation of the financial services sector prompted the U.S. Government to issue a financial advisory for Antigua and Barbuda in 1999. The advisory was lifted in 2001, but the U.S. Government continues to monitor the Government of Antigua and Barbuda's regulation of financial services.

The United States also has been active in supporting post-hurricane disaster assistance and rehabilitation through the U.S. Agency for International Development's (USAID) Office of Foreign Disaster Assistance and the Peace Corps. U.S. assistance is primarily channeled through multilateral agencies such as the World Bank and the Caribbean Development Bank (CDB), as well as through the USAID office in Bridgetown, Barbados.

Antigua and Barbuda is strategically situated in the Leeward Islands near maritime transport lanes of major importance to the United States. Antigua has long hosted a U.S. military presence. A former U.S. Navy support facility, turned over to the government of Antigua and Barbuda in 1995, is now being developed as a regional Coast Guard training facility.

Antigua and Barbuda's location close to the U.S. Virgin Islands and Puerto Rico makes it an attractive transshipment point for narcotics traffickers. To address these problems, the United States and Antigua and Barbuda have signed a series of counter-narcotic and counter-crime treaties and agreements, including a maritime law enforcement agreement (1995), subsequently amended to include overflight and order-to-land provisions (1996); a bilateral extradition treaty (1996); and a mutual legal assistance treaty (1996). In addition, Antigua and Barbuda receives counter-narcotics assistance and benefits from U.S. military exercise-related and humanitarian civic assistance construction projects.

In 2005, Antigua and Barbuda had 239,804 stay-over visitors, with nearly 28% of Antigua and Barbuda's visitors coming from the United States. It is estimated that 4,500 Americans reside in the country.

In 2005, both countries disputed a World Trade Organization ruling over gambling law. In 2007, relations were strained when Antigua and Barbuda demanded sanctions worth $3.4bn imposed on the US for its failure to obey the WTO gambling ruling, stating that "while we realise this is a significant step for Antigua and Barbuda to take, we feel we have no choice in the matter". Nevertheless, relations between the two countries are still strong.

== U.S. embassy officials ==
- Ambassador - Roger F. Nyhus
- Deputy Chief of Mission - Joaquin F. Monserrate

== Embassies ==
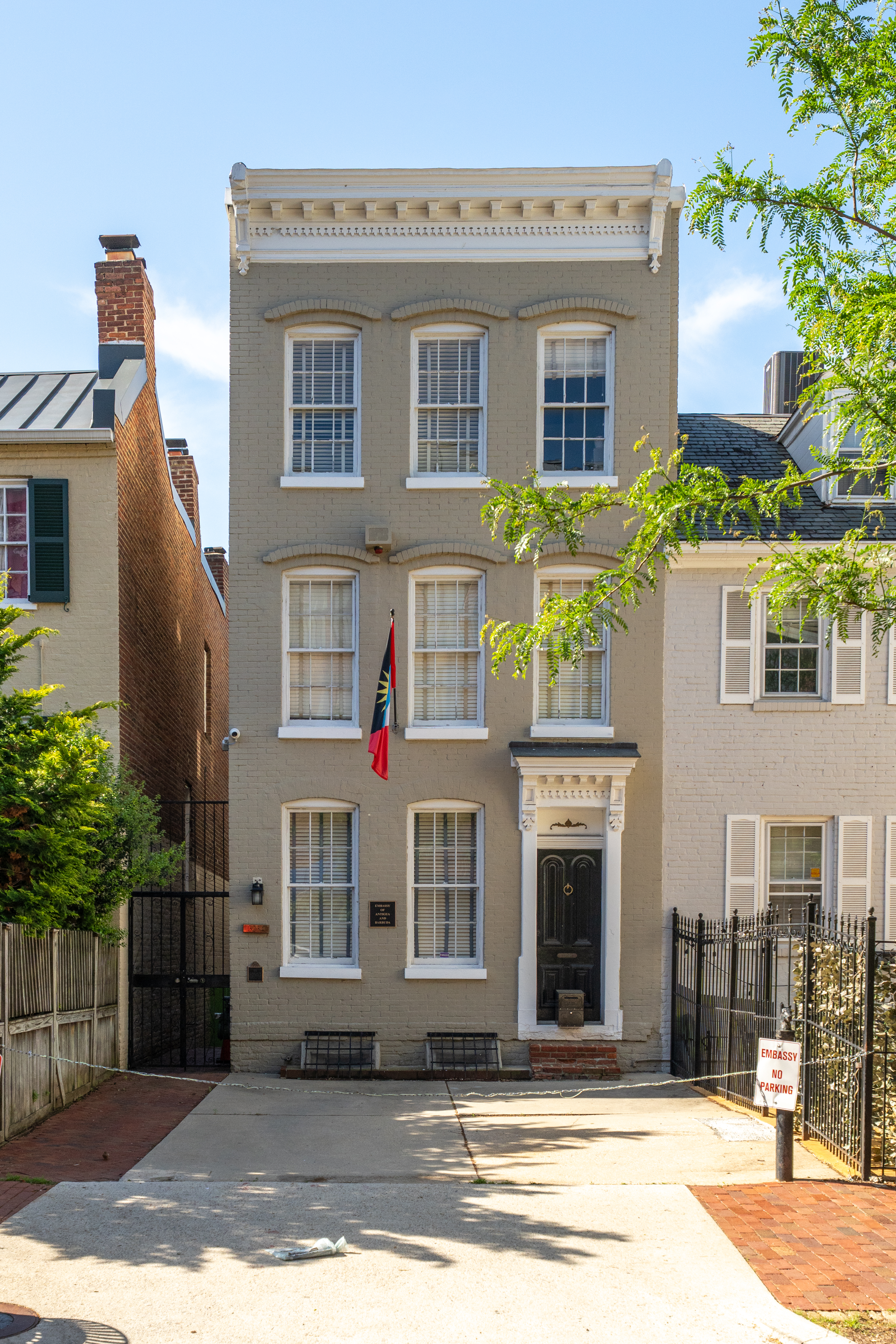
Embassy in Washington, D.C.

The United States maintains no official presence in Antigua. The Ambassador and embassy officers are resident in Barbados and travel to Antigua frequently. However, a U.S. consular agent resident in Antigua assists U.S. citizens in Antigua and Barbuda. The U.S. Embassy in Barbados is located in the Wildey Business Park, Wildey, St. Michael. Antigua and Barbuda has an embassy in Washington, D.C. located in the Georgetown neighborhood.

== See also ==
- North American Union
- North American Free Trade Agreement
- Free Trade Area of the Americas
- Third Border Initiative
- Caribbean Community
- Caribbean Basin Initiative (CBI)
- Caribbean Basin Trade Partnership Act
- Western Hemisphere Travel Initiative
- Foreign relations of the United States
- Foreign relations of Antigua and Barbuda
