= Skerrit =

Skerrit may refer to:

- Melissa Poponne Skerrit, Dominican politician
- Roosevelt Skerrit (born 1972), Dominican politician
- Shirley Skerrit-Andrew, Saint Kitts and Nevis economist and diplomat
- Skerrit (Dungeons & Dragons), a fictional deity of centaurs in the Dungeons and Dragons worlds

== See also ==
- Skerritt
