= Anthony Severin =

Saint Lucian diplomat

His Excellency Anthony Severin OBE SLC
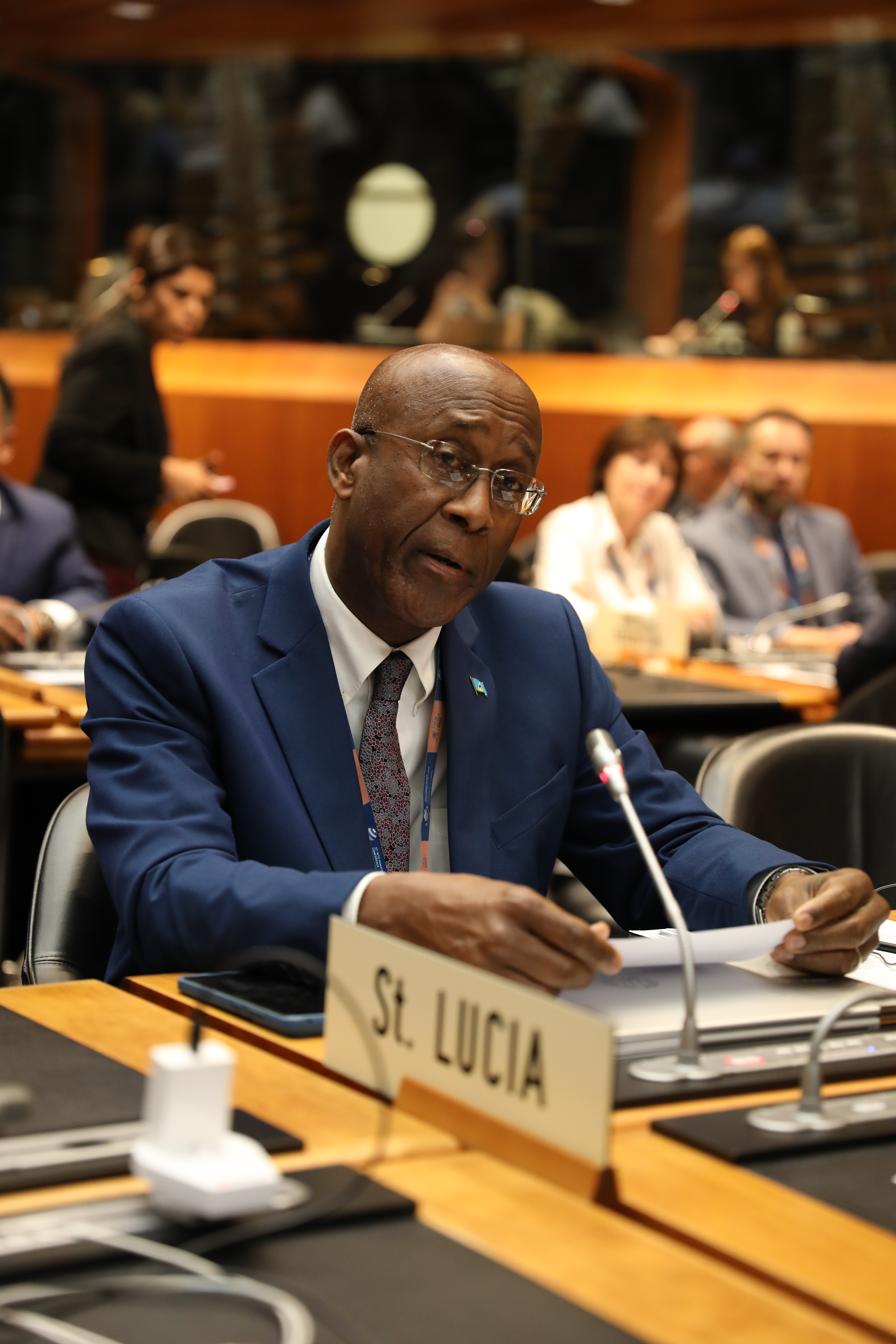

High Commissioner of Saint Lucia to the United Kingdom
- Incumbent
- Assumed office 2022

Personal details
- Education: University of the West Indies; University of Bradford

Anthony Bryan Severin is a Saint Lucian diplomat. He currently serves as the High Commissioner of Saint Lucia to the United Kingdom. He previously served as the Ambassador and Permanent Representative of Saint Lucia to the United Nations and the Caribbean Community.

== Education ==
Severin completed an economics and history degree at the University of the West Indies and then a master's degree in national development and public planning from the University of Bradford.

== Civil service career ==
In 1980, Severin joined the Saint Lucia Public Service. In 1994, he was made Cabinet Secretary and Permanent Secretary to the Office of the Prime Minister. In January 2002, Severin became Saint Lucia's ambassador to the Caribbean Community (CARICOM).

From August 2003 to November 2004, Severin was the Saint Lucia Permanent Representative to the United Nations. He was again appointed to the role in August 2006. In the 2012 Birthday Honours, Severin was appointed an Officer of the Order of the British Empire (OBE) "for his contribution to public and regional service." In the 2010s, Severin worked at the Organisation of Eastern Caribbean States (OECS) Commission as Head of International Relations, and was described in September 2020 as having "recently retired" from the role.

Since 2022, Severin has served as Saint Lucia's High Commissioner to the United Kingdom. He is also Saint Lucia's representative to the World Trade Organization, Food and Agriculture Organization, International Maritime Organization, Organisation for the Prohibition of Chemical Weapons, and the Bureau International des Expositions. In August 2022, Severin also became non-resident ambassador to France.

In March 2024, Severin received the Saint Lucia Cross for "Distinguished Service in the Field of Government, Public Service, Foreign Service and the Diplomatic Core."

== Awards ==
- Officer of the Order of the British Empire (OBE), 2012
- Saint Lucia Cross (SLC), 2024
