= Walton Alfonso Webson =

Antiguan diplomat

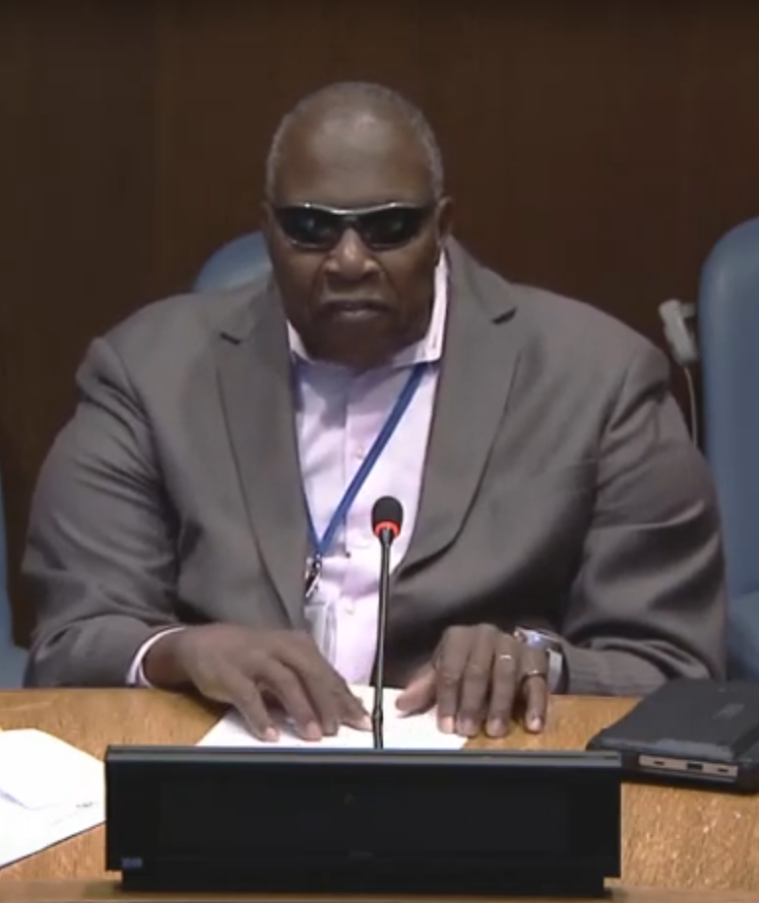

Permanent Representative from Antigua and Barbuda to the United Nations
- Incumbent
- Assumed office 17 December 2014

Personal details
- Education: The New School (BS, MS); Case Western Reserve University (PhD)

Walton Alfonso Webson is an Antiguan diplomat. He has served as the Permanent Representative to the United Nations in New York of Antigua and Barbuda since 2014. He was President of the UNICEF Executive Board at the international level in 2017.

== Biography ==
He holds a Bachelor of Science degree and a Master of Science in management of non-profit organizations from The New School for Social Research and a PhD in management from Case Western Reserve University. He worked for Perkins International from 1992 to 2014, and was the organization's Director from 2011.

He has also served as Chair of the Alliance of Small Island States (AOSIS) from 2021 to 2022.

== See also ==
- Ronald Sanders
- Claudius Cornelius Thomas
- Antigua.news
