= Linda Anne Scott =

Namibian diplomat

High Commissioner to the United Kingdom
- Incumbent
- Assumed office December 2018
- President: Hage Geingob
- Prime Minister: Saara Kuugongelwa-Amadhila

Deputy Permanent Representative at the United Nations
- In office 2016–2021
- Succeeded by: Neville Gertze

Director of Multilateral Relations and Cooperation
- In office 2014–2016

Personal details
- Born: 9 April 1964 (age 62) Windhoek, Namibia
- Children: 2
- Education: University of Cape Town, University of the Free State

Linda Anne Scott (born 9 April 1964) is a Namibian diplomat. She is High Commissioner to the United Kingdom. She was a delegate to the United Nations.

== Life ==
Linda Scott's involvement in anti-apartheid activities with the church led to her studying politics and anthropology at university, after which she taught English for a year.

Scott joined the Namibian Ministry of Foreign Affairs in 1990. She was posted to London and then to Cuba. In 1995 she was Personal Assistant to Netumbo Nandi-Ndaitwah, then the Deputy Minister of Foreign Affairs, who was Rapporteur to the World Conference on Women in Beijing. Subsequent postings saw her in Sweden, Belgium, Botswana, Nigeria, and Ethiopia. After time as Director of Multilateral Affairs in Namibia, she was appointed Deputy Permanent Representative at the United Nations. She was appointed High Commissioner to the United Kingdom in December 2018. She is simultaneously High Commissioner to Malta, and in August 2020 negotiated a donation of 500 tonnes of potatoes to the people of Namibia by the government of Malta.
