= Karen-Mae Hill =

Diplomat, High Commissioner for Antigua and Barbuda to the United Kingdom

Karen-Mae Hill OBE
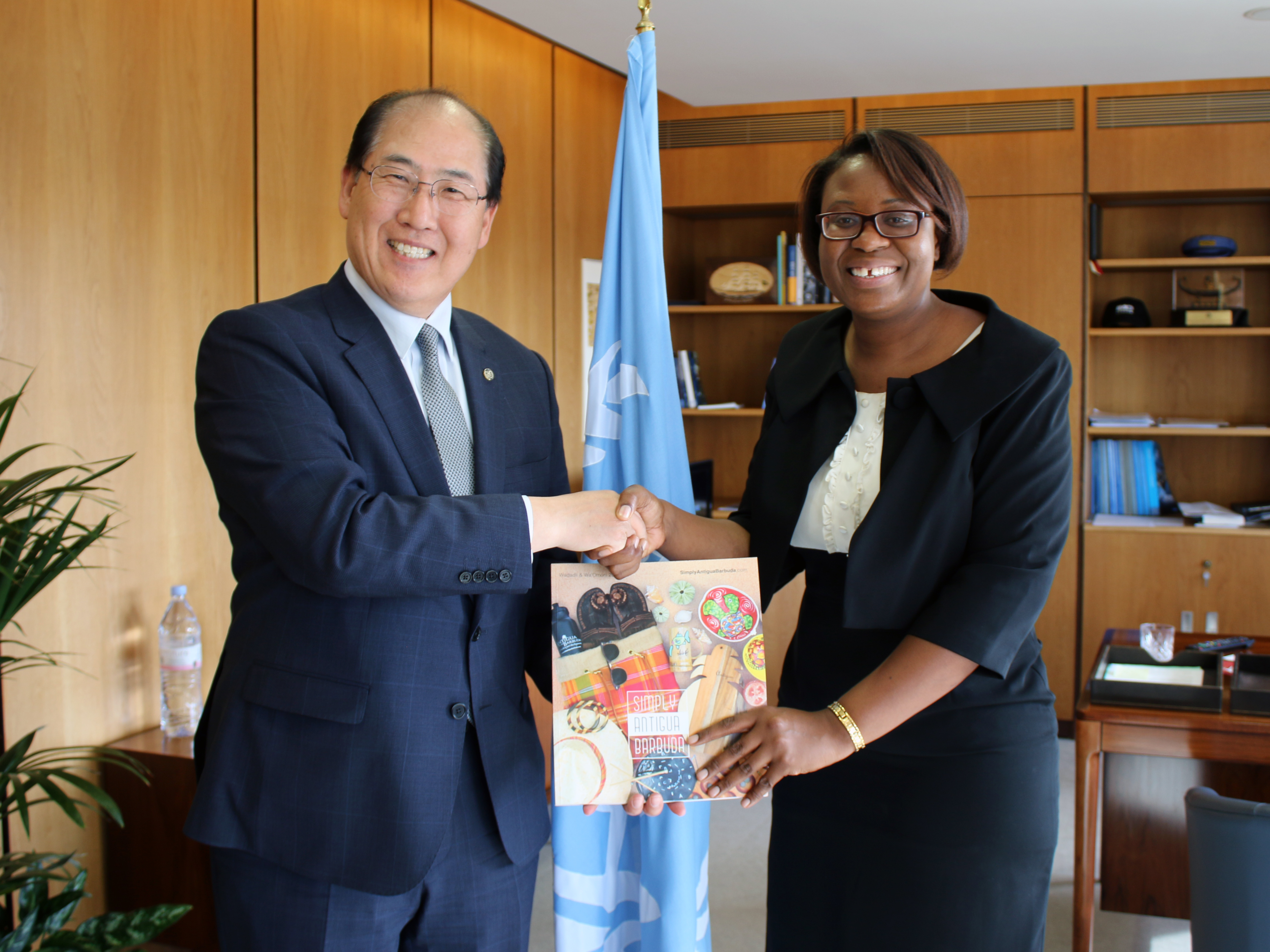

High Commissioner of Antigua and Barbuda to the United Kingdom | Ambassador Extraordinary and Plenipotentiary of Antigua and Barbuda to the Republic of Estonia
- Incumbent
- Assumed office November 2015
- Prime Minister: Gaston Browne

Personal details
- Education: University of Oxford, University of Leicester

Karen-Mae Hill, OBE is the High Commissioner for Antigua and Barbuda to the United Kingdom and member of the Commonwealth's Board of Governors. Hill is also the Ambassador Extraordinary and Plenipotentiary of Antigua and Barbuda to the Republic of Estonia, Non-resident Ambassador to Ireland, the Federal Republic of Germany and Lithuania.

She won a scholarships to study French and law at the University of Leicester in the United Kingdom before becoming the first Antiguan to win a Rhodes Scholarship to Oxford. Hill is a qualified Barrister in English law. She is the founder of the Antigua and Barbuda Youth Symphony Orchestra, co-founder and music director at the Potters Youth Group and an advocate for green technology.

== Education ==
Hill received a Bachelor of Law with French Law and Language (LLB) degree from the University of Leicester, UK. She received a MPhil in Development Studies from the University of Oxford, England.

== Career ==
After receiving her degrees, Hill served as a lawyer in England, Wales, and the Eastern Caribbean. She also worked in banking in Antigua.

Hill was appointed High Commissioner in November 2015. As High Commissioner, she signed the Multilateral Convention on Mutual Administrative Assistance in Tax Matters in 2018, making Antigua and Barbuda the 125th jurisdiction to do so. Also in 2018, Hill met with officials from the Home Office's Windrush Task Force.

In 2021, Hill signed the Joint Communiqué that established of diplomatic relations between the Republic of Kyrgyzstan and Antigua and Barbuda.

In 2022, Hill was appointed as Ordinary Officer of the Civil Division of the Order of the British Empire, OBE for services to Youth and Community Development. Also in 2022, Hill visited Jersey in the Channel Islands to visit catering venues that have hired Caribbean workers to fill labour shortages.

In 2023, Hillwas elected President of Administration and Budget Committee at 173rd Bureau International des Expositions (BIE) General Assembly in Paris.

== See also ==
- Ronald Sanders
- Carl Roberts (diplomat)
- Claudius Cornelius Thomas
- Antigua.news
