= High Commissioner for Antigua and Barbuda to the United Kingdom =

Coordinates: 51.518912°N 0.165146°W

The High Commissioner for Antigua and Barbuda to the United Kingdom is the official representative of the Government of Antigua and Barbuda to the Government of the United Kingdom. The High Commission is located in London. As of 2024, the title of High Commissioner is held by Karen-Mae Hill.

== History ==
The islands achieved independence from the United Kingdom in 1981.

Commissioned/ Accredited	High Commissioner (Commonwealth)	Observations	Prime Minister of Antigua and Barbuda	Prime Minister of the United Kingdom	Term end
1975	Claudius Cornelius Thomas		George Walter	Harold Wilson	1983
1984	Ronald Michael Sanders	(* January 26, 1948) Kt, KCMG. KCN, MA	Vere Cornwall Bird	Margaret Thatcher	1987
May 1987	James Alphaeus Emanuel Thomas		Vere Cornwall Bird	Margaret Thatcher	1995
December 4, 1995	Ronald Michael Sanders		Lester Bird	John Major	2004
December 8, 2004October 3, 2004	Carl Roberts (diplomat)		Baldwin Spencer	Tony Blair	2014
2015	Althea Allison Vanderpoole Banahene	Chargé d'affaires	Gaston Browne	David Cameron	2016
January 10, 2016	Karen-Mae Hill		Gaston Browne	David Cameron	
