= Elisa Ruiz Díaz =

Paraguayan diplomat (1964–2021)

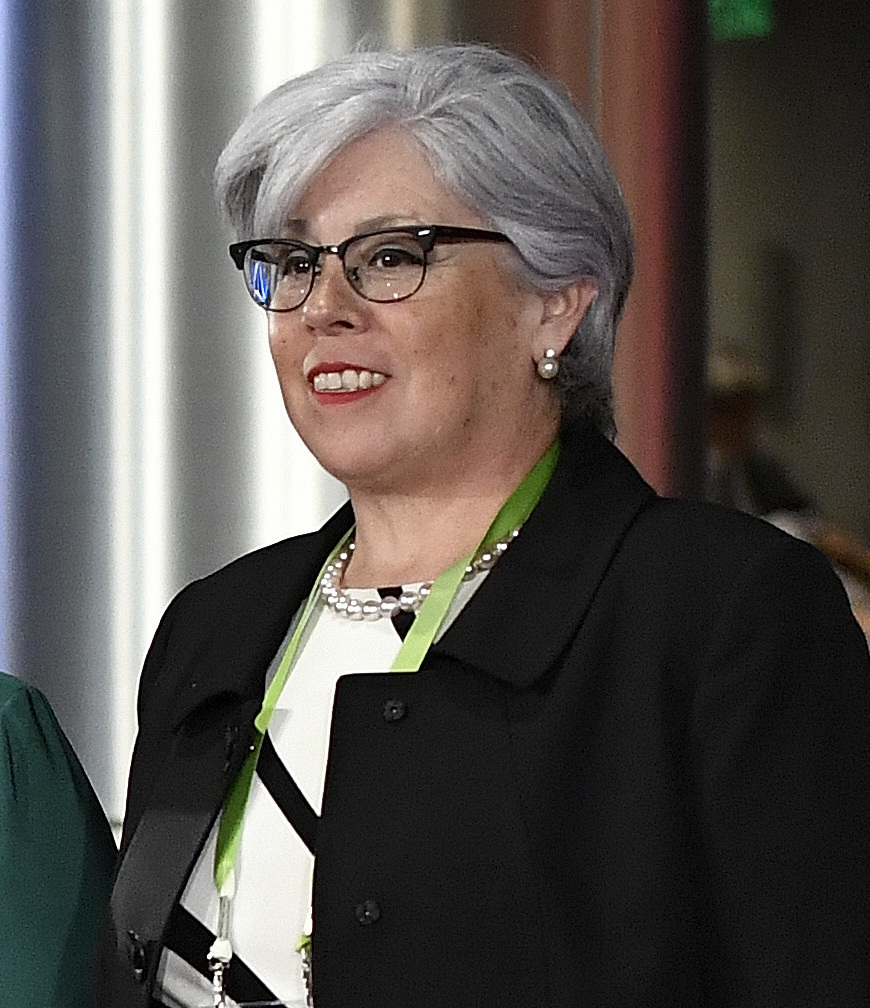
- Ruiz Díaz in 2018

Chair of the OAS Permanent Council
- In office 6 April 2021 – 19 May 2021

Ambassador of Paraguay to the OAS
- In office 2013–2021

Personal details
- Born: 16 October 1964 Paraguay
- Died: 19 May 2021 (aged 56) Washington, D.C., U.S.
- Party: ANR–PC

Elisa Mercedes Ruiz Díaz Bareiro (16 October 1964 – 19 May 2021) was a Paraguayan lawyer and diplomat. She was the Permanent Representative of Paraguay to the Organization of American States (OAS) from 2013 until her death. She served as the Chair of the OAS Permanent Council from 6 April 2021 to 19 May 2021.

== Early career ==
Ruiz Díaz was born on 16 October 1964. She studied law at the Universidad Nacional de Asunción. Joining the Colorado Party, she served as a member of the party's Electoral Tribunal as well as its Governing Board. Ruiz Díaz was elected as a Colorado candidate to the Constitutional Assembly in 1991, which was tasked with promulgating a new constitution. Twenty-one female delegates were elected, out of 198 in total. She later stood in the 1993 general election.

After 1999, Ruiz Díaz worked as a notary public for several firms such as Garden Automotores SA, La Consolidada SA de Seguros, and Visión Banco.

== Government ==
In the government, Ruiz Díaz served as Minister of the Permanent Mission of Paraguay to the Organization of American States (OAS), Advisory Minister of Communication of the Presidency of the Republic, General Director of the Post Office, and Chief of Cabinet of the Vice-Presidency of the Republic.

Ruiz Díaz was appointed as the Permanent Representative of Paraguay to the OAS in 2013. She represented Paraguay at the plenary of the 7th Summit of the Americas. On 6 April 2021, she became the chair of the OAS Permanent Council for a three-month term. The OAS member countries hold this position in rotation, and Paraguay's previous turn was in 2013. As chair, Ruiz Díaz pressed for equitable distribution of COVID-19 vaccines among the countries of the Americas.

== Death ==
Ruiz Díaz died on 19 May 2021 in Washington, D.C. The Inter-American Commission on Human Rights said that she had been ill for a year prior. She was the longest currently-serving Permanent Representative to the OAS. The Vice Chair of the OAS Permanent Council, Ronald Sanders from Antigua and Barbuda, completed her term as chair.

In December 2021, the OAS dedicated a conference room in her honor at its headquarters in Washington, D.C.
