= Ambassador of the Organisation of Eastern Caribbean States to the European Union =

Coordinates: 50.829815°N 4.359408°E

Ambassador of Organisation of Eastern Caribbean States to European Union
- Inaugural holder: Claudius Cornelius Thomas
- Formation: February 21, 1984

The Ambassador of the Organisation of Eastern Caribbean States to the European Union is the official representative of the governments of the Organisation of Eastern Caribbean States to the governments of the European Union.

== List of representatives ==
Diplomatic agrément/Diplomatic accreditation	ambassador	Observations	Secretary of the Organisation of Eastern Caribbean States	President of the European Commission	Term end
February 21, 1984	Claudius Cornelius Thomas		Vaughan Lewis	José Manuel Barroso	
February 21, 1994	Edwin P. J. Laurent	OBE is Head of the International Trade and Regional Co-operation Section at the Commonwealth Secretariat. His career started in Saint Lucia becoming Principal Assistant Secretary - Ministry of Finance then Permanent Secretary of the Ministry of Trade Industry and Tourism. Later he held various diplomatic posts including, Ambassador to the WTO, EU, France, Germany and to Belgium	Vaughan Lewis	José Manuel Barroso	
April 20, 2009	Shirley Skerritt-Andrew		Len Monica Ishmael	José Manuel Barroso	
July 23, 2014	Len Monica Ishmael		Didacus Jules	José Manuel Barroso	February 2017
December 3, 2021	H.E Malgorzata Wasilewska				

- Foreign relations of Saint Lucia
- Foreign relations of the European Union
