= Len Ishmael =

Saint Lucain scholar

Len Ishmael is a St. Lucian development planner and geographer who was the Director General of the Organisation of Eastern Caribbean States from 12 May 2003 until the end of December 2013. She was appointed Ambassador of the Organisation of Eastern Caribbean States to the European Union in 2013, succeeding Shirley Skerrit-Andrew.

She holds a first degree in geography and economics from the University of the West Indies, Mona campus, and a doctorate in urban planning and development economics from the University of Pennsylvania.
