= Carles Jordana Madero =

Andorran politician

Carles Jordana Madero (born December 2, 1977 (age 48)) is an Andorran politician, diplomat and lawyer and former member of the Andorran General Council, for the Democrats for Andorra. He was elected in 2015. Jordana is currently non-resident Ambassador to the United Kingdom of Great Britain and Northern Ireland and the Republic of Ireland.

== Education ==
In 2003, he received a Master's degree in business law at the Toulouse (I) University Capitole and a postgraduate degree in Andorran Law from the University of Andorra in 2006.
