= Deborah-Mae Lovell =

Antiguan and Barbudan diplomat

Deborah-Mae Lovell DCN
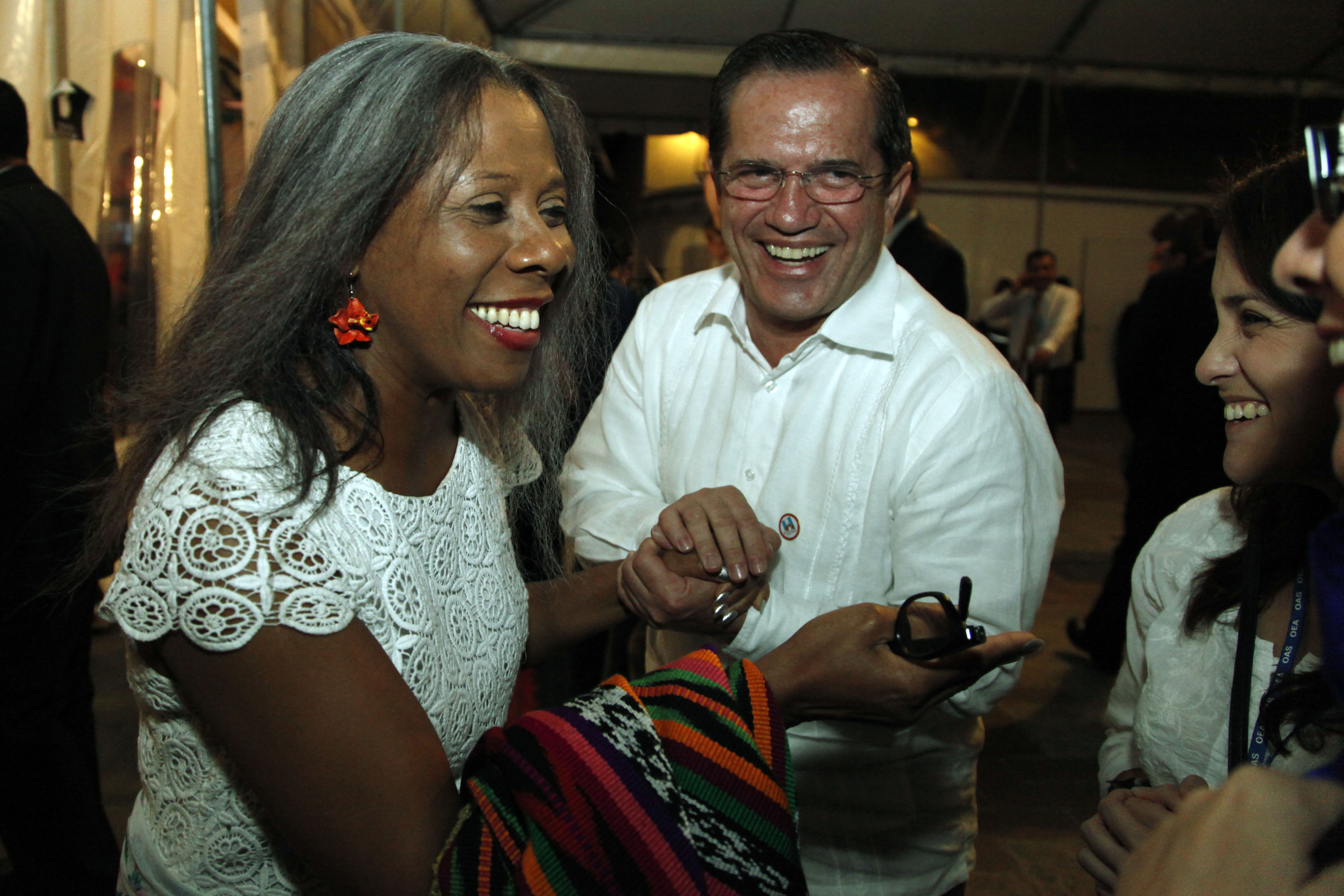
- Antigua (Guatemala), June 6, 2013. The Permanent Representative of Antigua and Barbuda to the OAS, Deborah-Mae Lovell, with the Foreign Minister of Ecuador, Ricardo Patiño. Photo: Fernanda LeMarie - Foreign Ministry of Ecuador.
- Occupation: Ambassador
- Honours: Dame Commander of the Most Distinguished Order of the Nation

Dame Deborah Mae Lovell, DCN, is an Antiguan and Barbudan woman who served as Ambassador to the U.S. and the Organization of American States (OAS).

== Career ==
Lovell has been in the foreign service for over 25 years, starting in 1983 as a Third Secretary in the High Commission for Eastern Caribbean States in London. In addition to London, she has worked in Ottawa, Canada; Washington, D.C., the United Nations in New York, N.Y.

Lovell was appointed to the OAS September 17, 2004. During her tenure there, Antigua and Barbuda led adoption the Inter-American Convention against Racism, Racial Discrimination and Related Forms of Intolerance (2013) and the Inter-American Convention against All Forms of Discrimination and Intolerance (2013). When she was the chair of the Permanent Council, the General Assembly passed the Youth and Democratic Values declaration, highlighting her focus on youth empowerment. She was also known for her work promoting women entrepreneurship and against domestic violence.

Lovell presented her credentials to become the Antiguan and Barbudan ambassador to the U.S. on August 8, 2005.

== Awards and recognitions ==
Lovell was given her knighthood on August 4, 2011, with the title Dame Commander of the Most Distinguished Order of the Nation (DCN) for services as a civil servant and career diplomat.

When she became a Dame (the woman's equivalent of “Sir”), she was the only person knighted that year and one of a very small number of Antiguan and Barbudan women ever to receive such an honor.

Lovell retired from foreign service on December 1, 2014.

== See also ==
- Ronald Sanders
