= Keeper of the Privy Seal =

Keeper of the Privy Seal may refer to:

- Keeper of the Privy Seal of Ireland
- Keeper of the Privy Seal of Scotland
- Lord Keeper of the Privy Seal of Japan
- Lord Privy Seal, Lord Keeper of the Privy Seal of the United Kingdom

== See also ==
- "Lord Privy Seal" (term)
- Privy seal
