= Shirley Skerrit-Andrew =

Economist and diplomat

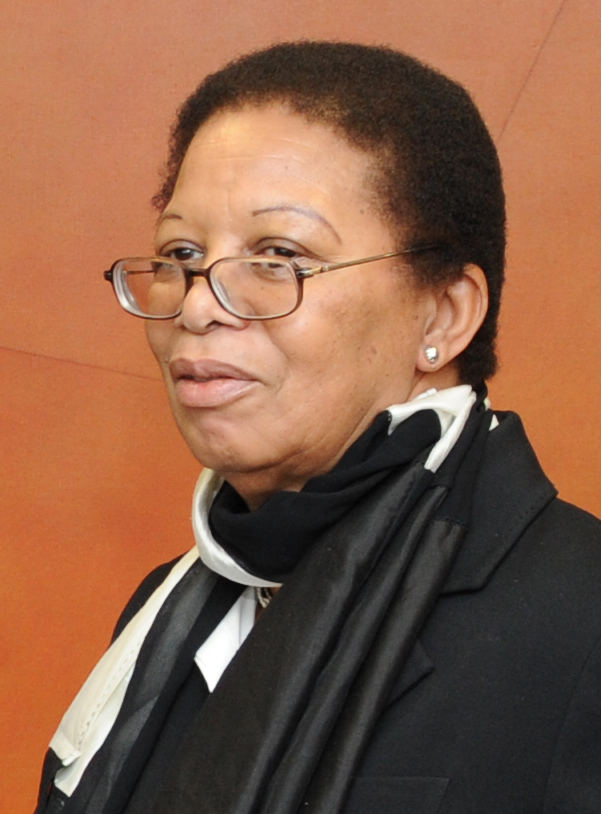
Skerritt-Andrew in 2009

Shirley Skerrit-Andrew is an economist and diplomat from St Kitts, who was appointed Ambassador of the Organisation of Eastern Caribbean States to the European Union on 30 October 2008. At her appointment she became the federation's first non-resident woman ambassador. She held the appointment until 2013, when she was succeeded by Len Ishmael.

As the first appointment to a newly created role, she took up her post as High Commissioner to Canada in 2016, with a brief to focus on renewable energy technologies. She was succeeded in the role by Sherry Tross, who was appointed in 2018.

In 2016 she was listed as one of St Kitts and Nevis' '40 Most Powerful Women'.
