= Organisation of Eastern Caribbean States =

Intergovernmental organisation

Organisation of Eastern Caribbean States Organisation des États de la Caraïbe orientale (French)
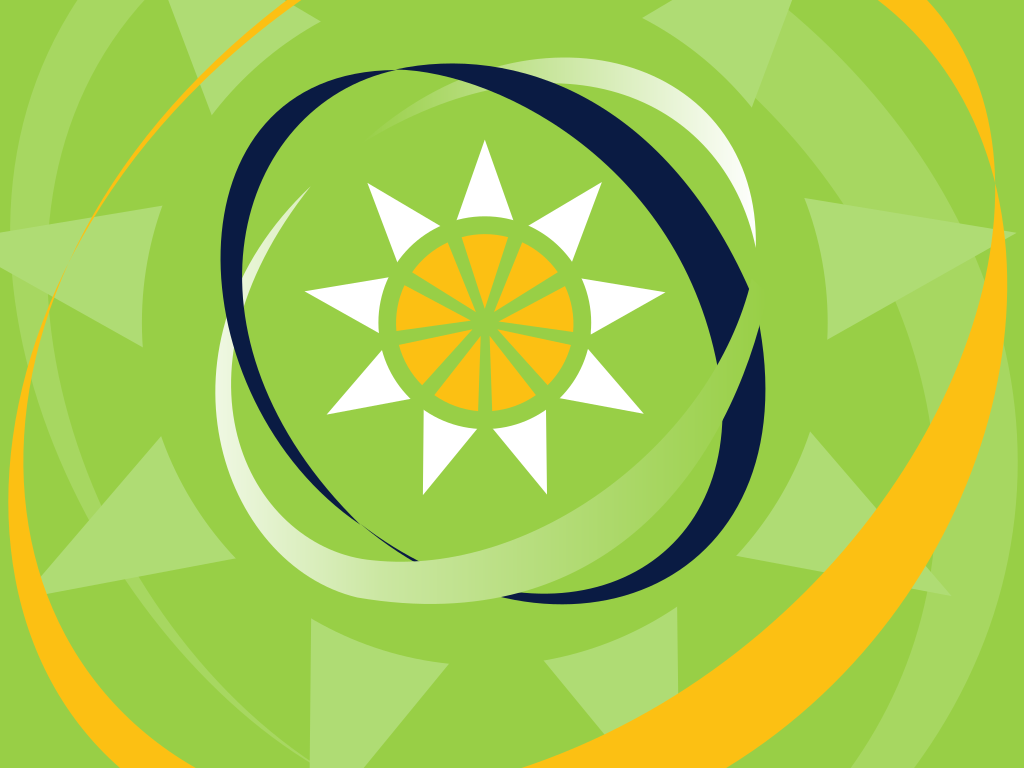
- Flag Logo

- Protocol member Associate member
- Commission: Castries
- Working languages: English; French
- Type: Political and economic union within the Caribbean Community
- Membership: 7 protocol: Antigua and Barbuda; Dominica; Grenada; Montserrat; Saint Kitts and Nevis; Saint Lucia; Saint Vincent and the Grenadines; 5 associate: Anguilla; British Virgin Islands; Guadeloupe; Martinique; Saint Martin

Leaders
  - Chairman: Gaston Browne
  - Director-General: Didacus Jules

Establishment
  - Treaty of Basseterre: 18 June 1981
  - Revised Treaty of Basseterre: 21 January 2011

Area
  - Total: 2,709 km^{2} (1,046 sq mi)
  - Including Associate Members: 5,910 km^{2} (2,280 sq mi)

Population
  - 2017 estimate: ▲615,724
  - Including Associate Members: 1,465,689
  - Density: 215.6/km^{2} (558.4/sq mi)
- GDP (nominal): 2017 estimate
  - Total: $6.7 billion; $29.6 billion (Including Associate Members)
  - Per capita: $10,879; $20,622 (Including Associate Members)
- Currency: 3 currencies: East Caribbean Dollar (Protocol members and Anguilla); US Dollar (British Virgin Islands); Euro (Guadeloupe, Martinique)
- Time zone: UTC-4 (AST)
- Internet TLD: 10 TLDs: (Anguilla) .ai; (Antigua and Barbuda) .ag; (British Virgin Islands) .vg; (Dominica) .dm; (Grenada) .gd; (Guadeloupe) .gp; (Martinique) .mq/.fr; (Montserrat) .ms; (Saint Kitts and Nevis) .kn; (Saint Lucia) .lc; (Saint Vincent and the Grenadines) .vc
- Website www.oecs.org
Preceded by
East Caribbean Common Market; Caribbean Community

The Organisation of Eastern Caribbean States (OECS; French: Organisation des États de la Caraïbe orientale, OECO) is an inter-governmental organisation dedicated to economic harmonisation and integration, protection of human and legal rights, and the encouragement of good governance between countries and territories in the Eastern Caribbean. It also performs the role of spreading responsibility and liability in the event of natural disaster.

The administrative body of the OECS is the Commission, which is headquartered in Castries, the capital of Saint Lucia.

OECS operates an economic union within the larger CARICOM economic union. Eight members operate as a currency union - the Eastern Caribbean Currency Union, using the Eastern Caribbean dollar.

== History ==
OECS was created on 18 June 1981, with the Treaty of Basseterre, which was named after the capital city of St. Kitts and Nevis. OECS is the successor of the Leewards Islands' political organisation known as the West Indies Associated States (WISA).

One prominent aspect of OECS economic bloc has been the accelerated pace of trans-national integration among its member states.

The seven protocol members of the OECS, as well as two of the five associate members—Anguilla and the British Virgin Islands—are either full or associate members of the Caribbean Community (CARICOM) and were among the second group of countries that joined the CARICOM Single Market and Economy (CSME). Martinique is currently negotiating to become an associate member of the Caribbean Community.

== Projects ==
=== Passport ===
A common OECS Passport was originally planned for 1 January 2003 but its introduction was delayed. At the 38th OECS Authority Meeting in January 2004, the Secretariat was mandated to have the two companies expressing an interest in producing the common passport (De La Rue Identity Systems and the Canadian Banknote Company) make presentations at the next (39th) Authority Meeting. At the 39th Meeting the critical issue of the relationship between the OECS passport and the CARICOM passport was discussed and at the 40th OECS Authority Meeting in November 2004, the OECS Heads of Government agreed to give CARICOM a further 6 months (until May 2005) to introduce a CARICOM Passport. Failure to introduce the CARICOM Passport by that time would have resulted in the OECS moving ahead with its plans to introduce the OECS Passport. As the CARICOM Passport was first introduced in January 2005 (by Suriname) then the idea of the OECS Passport was abandoned. Had the passport been introduced however it would not have been issued to Economic Citizens within the OECS states.

It would also be unknown if the islands under British sovereignty would join the scheme.

=== Economic union ===
The decision to establish an economic union was taken by OECS Heads of Government at the 34th meeting of the Authority held in Dominica in July 2001. At the 35th meeting of the Authority in Anguilla in January 2002, the main elements of an economic union implementation project were endorsed. The project was expected to be implemented over a two-year period with seven of the nine OECS member states (i.e. Antigua and Barbuda, Dominica, Grenada, Montserrat, St. Kitts and Nevis, St. Lucia and St. Vincent and the Grenadines) participating in the economic union initiative. The remaining two member states, Anguilla and the British Virgin Islands, would not have participated immediately, but would have requested time to consider the issue further. In 2003, work had been initiated on the central issue of the creation of new Treaty arrangements to replace the Treaty of Basseterre which established the OECS. Among the elements of the project was the creation of a technical committee for a draft OECS Economic Union Treaty. This technical committee was inaugurated on 4 May 2004 and began designing the draft Treaty.

==== OECS Economic Treaty ====
The new OECS Economic Union Treaty was finally presented at the 43rd OECS Meeting in St. Kitts on 21 June 2006. The Authority requested changes to allow a role for national parliamentary representatives (both government and opposition) of the Member States in the form of a regional Assembly of Parliamentarians. This body, it was felt, was necessary to act as a legislative filter to the Authority in its law making capacity. The Heads further directed that the Treaty be reviewed by a meeting of members of the Task Force, Attorneys General, the draftsperson for the Treaty and representatives of the OECS Secretariat.

The presentation of the Treaty at the Meeting was followed by the signing of a Declaration of Intent to implement the Treaty by the Heads of Government or their representatives (except that of the British Virgin Islands). It was agreed in the Declaration, that implementation of the Treaty would occur only after a year of public consultation, through a mass national and regional education programme with strong political leadership and direction. According to the Declaration, the Treaty was to be signed, and the Economic Union was to be established by 1 July 2007.

==== Revised treaty ====
This intended deadline was missed, however, and after the signing of the Revised Treaty of Basseterre Establishing the Organisation of Eastern Caribbean States Economic Union on 18 June 2010, the newest target date of 21 January 2011 was met when five of the six independent signatory Member States ratified the Treaty. These were Antigua and Barbuda (30 December 2010), St. Vincent and the Grenadines (12 January 2011), St. Kitts and Nevis (20 January 2011), Grenada (20 January 2011) and Dominica (21 January 2011). In order for the Treaty to have entered into force at least four of the independent Member States must have ratified it by 21 January 2011. Montserrat had received entrustments from the United Kingdom to sign the Treaty but is unlikely to be in a position ratify the Treaty before a new constitution comes into force in the territory. Following the need of the Eastern Caribbean Central Bank to temporarily assume control of two indigenous commercial banks in Anguilla, the Chief Minister of Anguilla, Hubert Hughes, announced on 12 August 2013 that Anguilla will seek to join the OECS Economic Union as soon possible in order to fully participate in the strategy of growth conceived by the Eastern Caribbean Currency Union (which was crafted within the context of the Economic Union). He was supported in his position by St. Lucia's Prime Minister, Dr. Kenny Anthony, who also called on Anguilla to join the Economic Union to complement its membership of the Currency Union.

==== Provisions of the Treaty ====
The provisions of the Economic Union Treaty prior to its ratification were expected to include:

- The free circulation of goods and trade in services within the OECS
- Free movement of labour by December 2007
- The free movement of capital (via support of the money and capital market programme of the Eastern Caribbean Central Bank)
- A regional Assembly of Parliamentarians
- A common external tariff

Some of these provisions would already have been covered to some extent by the CSME, but some, such as the Assembly of Parliamentarians, would be unique to the OECS. Although some of the provisions would seem to duplicate efforts by the CSME, the Declaration of Intent and statements by some OECS leaders, acknowledge the CSME and give assurance that the OECS Economic Union would not run counter to CARICOM integration but that it would become seamlessly integrated into the CSME. To this end, the OECS Heads of Government agreed that steps should be taken to ensure that the OECS Economic Union Treaty would be recognised under the Revised Treaty of Chaguaramas, just as the original Treaty of Chaguaramas had recognised the Treaty of Basseterre.

This was achieved in 2013 at the Twenty-Fourth Inter-Sessional Meeting of the Conference of Heads of Government of CARICOM held in Port-au-Prince, Haiti, from 18–19 February 2013. At that conference CARICOM leaders adopted the OECS’ Revised Treaty of Basseterre into CARICOM’s Revised Treaty of Chaguaramas, which St. Vincent and the Grenadines Prime Minister, Ralph Gonsalves said would effectively give CARICOM member states the opportunity of integrating initially with the OECS and taking a seemingly quicker path to integration. In order to achieve this the Conference agreed that the Inter-Governmental Task Force (IGTF) revising the Treaty of Chaguaramas would recognise the provisions of the Treaty establishing the Economic Union of the Organisation of Eastern Caribbean States (OECS). The IGTF was mandated to refer back to the Conference at its next meeting on this issue.

The Economic Union Treaty's provisions are now expected to establish a Single Financial and Economic Space within which goods, people and capital move freely; harmonize monetary and fiscal policies Member States are expected continue to adopt a common approach to trade, health, education and environment, as well as to the development of such critical sectors as agriculture, tourism and energy. The Economic Union Treaty (or Revised Treaty as it is sometimes known) will also create two new organs for governing the OCES; The Regional Assembly (consisting of members of parliaments/legislatures) and The Commission (a strengthened Secretariat). The free movement of OECS nationals within the subregion is expected to commence in August 2011 after a commitment towards that goal by the Heads of Government at their meeting in May 2011.

This was achieved on schedule with the six independent OECS members and later Montserrat with nationals being allowed to enter the participating Member States without hindrance and remain for an indefinite period in order to work, establish businesses; provide services or to reside. The free movement of OECS nationals throughout the Economic Union is underpinned by legislation and is facilitated by administrative mechanisms This is achieved by OECS nationals entering the special immigration lines for CARICOM nationals when traveling throughout the Economic Union and presenting a valid photo ID and completed Entry/Departure form whereupon the immigration officer shall grant the national entry for an indefinite period save where the national presents a security risk or where there exists some other legal basis for prohibiting entry.

== Membership ==
OECS currently has twelve members which together form a continuous archipelago across the Leeward Islands and Windward Islands. Anguilla, the British Virgin Islands, Guadeloupe and Martinique are only associate members of OECS. Diplomatic missions of the OECS do not represent the associate members. For all other purposes, associate members are treated as equals of full members.

Six of the members were formerly colonies of the United Kingdom. Three others, Anguilla, the British Virgin Islands, and Montserrat remain overseas territories of the UK while Martinique and Guadeloupe are French departments and regions of France, and Saint-Martin is a French overseas collectivity. Eight of the twelve members are constitutional monarchies with King Charles III as their current monarch (Dominica is a republic with a President). There is no requirement for the members to have been British colonies; however, the close historical, cultural and economic relationship fostered by almost all of them having been British colonies is as much a factor in the membership of the OECS as their geographical proximity.

All seven full members are also the founding members of the OECS, having been a part of the organisation since its founding on 18 June 1981. The British Virgin Islands was the first associate member, joining on 22 November 1984 and Anguilla was the second, joining in 1995. Martinique became an associate member on 12 April 2016 becoming the first non-British or formerly British territory to join the OECS. Guadeloupe joined as an associate member of the OECS on 14 March 2019 at a Special Meeting of the OECS Authority held on that island on 14–15 March 2019. In 2019 the OECS Authority agreed to approve the transition of Saint-Martin from observer status to associate membership by the end of December 2019.

The list of full and associate members of the OECS is as follows:

State	Status	Capital	Joined	Pop.^{(2017)}	Area^{(km²)}	GDP^{(Nominal) (millions of US$)}	GDP^{(Nominal) per cap.}	HDI^{(2023)}	Curr.	Official Language(s)
Antigua and Barbuda	Member	St. John's	Founder	91,244	443	1,524	$16,702	0.851	EC$	None
Commonwealth of Dominica	Member	Roseau	Founder	70,693	751	557	$7,879	0.761	EC$	English
Grenada	Member	St. George's	Founder	107,541	344	1,119	$10,405	0.791	EC$	English
Montserrat	Member	Brades	Founder	4,417	102	63	$12,301	–	EC$	English
Saint Kitts and Nevis	Member	Basseterre	Founder	55,411	261	964	$17,397	0.840	EC$	English
Saint Lucia	Member	Castries	Founder	175,498	617	1,684	$9,607	0.748	EC$	English
Saint Vincent and the Grenadines	Member	Kingstown	Founder	110,185	389	785	$7,124	0.798	EC$	English
Anguilla	Associate Member	The Valley	1995	15,253	96	337	$22,090	–	EC$	English
British Virgin Islands	Associate Member	Road Town	1984	35,015	151	1,164	$33,233	–	US$	English
Guadeloupe	Associate Member	Basse-Terre	2019	393,640	1,628	10,946	$27,808	–	Euro	French
Martinique	Associate Member	Fort-de-France	2015	374,780	1,128	10,438	$27,851	–	Euro	French

Anguilla, the British Virgin Islands, and Montserrat are British Overseas Territories. Thus, foreign relations are the responsibility of the UK government. Guadeloupe and Martinique are French Overseas departments and regions. Thusly foreign relations are the responsibility of the French government.

=== Possible future memberships ===
Although almost all of the current full and associate members are past or present British dependencies, other islands in the region have expressed interest in becoming associate members of the OECS. The first was the United States Virgin Islands, which applied for associate membership in February 1990 and requested that US Federal Government allow the territory to participate as such. At that time, it was felt by the US government that it was not an appropriate time to make such a request. However, the US Virgin Islands remained interested in the OECS and, as of 2002, stated that it would revisit the issue with the US government at a later date. In 2001, Saba, an island of the Netherlands Antilles, decided to seek membership in the OECS. Saba's Island Council had passed a motion on 30 May 2001 calling for Saba's membership in the organisation and subsequently on 7 June 2001, the Executive Council of Saba decided in favour of membership. Saba's senator in the Netherlands Antilles parliament was then asked to present a motion requesting the Antillean parliament to support Saba's quest for membership. In addition to the support from the Antillean parliament, Saba also required a dispensation from the government of the Kingdom of the Netherlands to become an associate member of the OECS. Saba's bid for membership was reportedly supported by St. Kitts and Nevis and discussed at the 34th meeting of OECS leaders in Dominica in July. Also in 2001, Sint Maarten, another part of the Netherlands Antilles, explored the possibility of joining the OECS. After learning of Saba's intentions to join, St. Maarten suggested exploring ways in which Saba and St. Maarten could support each other in their pursuit of membership.

None of the prospective members have become associate members as yet, but Saba, St. Eustatius and St. Maarten do participate in the meetings of the Council of Tourism Ministers (as the Forum of Tourism Ministers of the Eastern Caribbean, along with representatives of Saint-Martin, Saint Barthélemy, Martinique and Guadeloupe).

=== Political union with Trinidad and Tobago ===
On 13 August 2008 the leaders of Trinidad & Tobago, Grenada, St. Lucia, and St. Vincent & the Grenadines announced their intention to pursue a sub-regional political union within CARICOM. As part of the preliminary discussions the Heads of Government for the involved states announced that 2011 would see their states entering into an economic union. This was however derailed by a change of government in Trinidad and Tobago in 2010.

=== Venezuela seeking membership ===
In 2008 the heads of the OECS also received a request from Venezuela to join the grouping.

The OECS Director General at the time Len Ishmael confirmed Venezuela's application was discussed at the 48th Meeting of the OECS Authority held in Montserrat. But she said OECS decision-makers within the region were yet to determine whether membership should be granted for Venezuela. Since that application, Membership was not granted as it has been limited to the Eastern Caribbean archipelago.

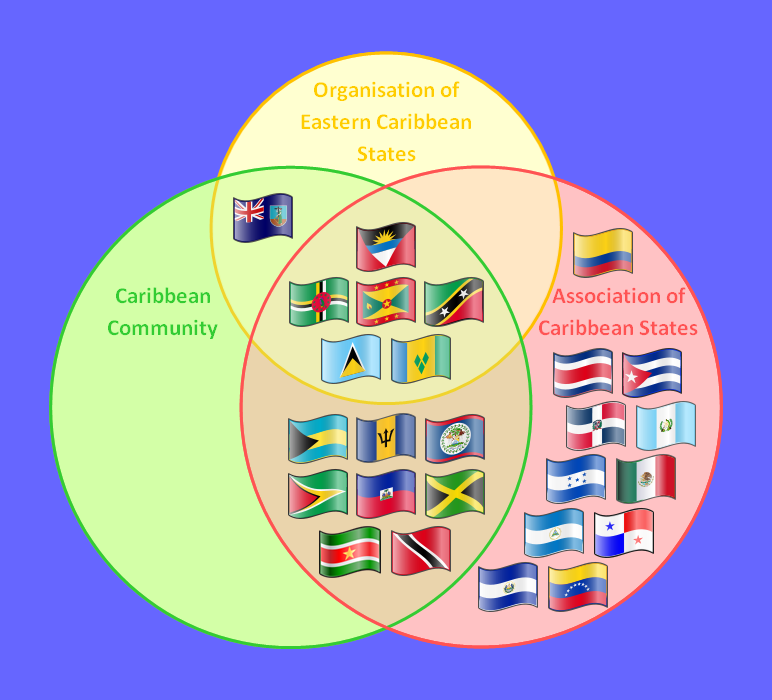
A clickable Venn diagram showing the relationships between various Supranational Caribbean Organisations and agreements

A clickable Euler diagram showing the relationships between various multinational organizations in the Americas

== Composite & Organs ==
=== Secretariat ===
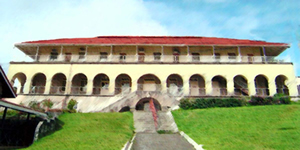
OECS Secretariat building.

The functions of the Organisation are set out in the Treaty of Basseterre and are coordinated by the Secretariat under the direction and management of the Director General.

The OECS functions in a rapidly changing international economic environment, characterised by globalisation and trade liberalisation which are posing serious challenges to the economic and social stability of their small island members.

It is the purpose of the Organisation to assist its Members to respond to these multi-faceted challenges by identifying scope for joint or coordinated action towards the economic and social advancement of their countries.

The restructuring of the Secretariat was informed by considerations of cost effectiveness in the context of the need to respond to the increasing challenges placed on it, taking into account the limited fiscal capacities of its members. The Secretariat consists of four main Divisions responsible for: External Relations, Functional Cooperation, Corporate Services and Economic Affairs. These four Divisions oversee the work of a number of specialised institutions, work units or projects located in six countries: Antigua/Barbuda, Commonwealth of Dominica, St Lucia, Belgium, Canada, and the United States of America.

In carrying out its mission, the OECS works along with a number of sub-regional and regional agencies and institutions. These include the Eastern Caribbean Central Bank (ECCB); the Caribbean Community (Caricom) Secretariat; the Caribbean Regional Negotiating Machinery (RNM) and the Caribbean Development Bank (CDB).

=== Director General ===
The authority within the OECS Secretariat is led by the Director General. The current Director General of the OECS is Dr. Didacus Jules (Registrar and Chief Executive Officer of the Barbados-based Caribbean Examinations Council), who took his new position on 1 May 2014. The former Dr. Len Ishmael demitted the office at the end of December 2013.

== Central Bank ==
Many of the OECS member-states are participants in the Eastern Caribbean Central Bank (ECCB) monetary authority. The regional central bank oversees financial and banking integrity for the Organisation of Eastern Caribbean States economic bloc of states. Part of the bank's oversight is maintaining the financial integrity of the East Caribbean dollar (XCD). Of all OECS member-states, only the British Virgin Islands, Guadeloupe and Martinique do not use the East Caribbean dollar as their de facto native currency.

All other members belong to the Eastern Caribbean Currency Union.

== Eastern Caribbean Supreme Court ==
The Eastern Caribbean Supreme Court (ECSC), which was created during the era of WISA, today handles the judicial matters in the Organisation of Eastern Caribbean States. When a trial surpasses the stage of High Court in an OECS member state, it can then be passed on to the ECSC at the level of Supreme court. Cases appealed from the stage of ECSC Supreme Court will then be referred to the jurisdiction of the Judicial Committee of the Privy Council. The Caribbean Court of Justice (CCJ) was established in 2003, but constitutional changes need to be put in place before the CCJ becomes the final Court of Appeal.

=== Other agencies ===
- Eastern Caribbean Civil Aviation Authority

== Security ==
The OECS sub-region has a military support unit known as the Regional Security System (RSS). It is made up of the independent countries of the OECS along with Barbados and Guyana. The unit is based in the island of Barbados and receives funding and training from various countries including the United States, Canada and the People's Republic of China.

== Foreign relations ==
The full members of the OECS maintain a handful of diplomatic missions in their capital-cities. All full members of the OECS host resident diplomatic missions of: Cuba, and Venezuela.

=== Shared diplomatic missions ===
Country	Location	Mission
Belgium	Brussels	Embassies of the Eastern Caribbean States and Missions to the European Union
Switzerland	Geneva	Permanent Delegation of the Organisation of Eastern Caribbean States in Geneva

== Health – Pharmaceutical Procurement Service ==
The Pharmaceutical Procurement Service, also known as the Eastern Caribbean Drug Service, procures medicines and allied health equipment on behalf of the member States. It has an 840 item product portfolio based on the regional formulary. it is said to generate savings of $5 million a year.

== Symbols, flag and logo ==
The flag and logo of the OECS consists of a complex pattern of concentric design elements on a pale green field, focused on a circle of nine inwardly pointed orange triangles and nine outwardly pointed white triangles. It was adopted 21 June 2006, and first raised on that day at Basseterre, St. Kitts and Nevis.

== See also ==
- Association of Caribbean States
- Caribbean Community
- European Economic Area
- Eastern Caribbean Davis Cup team
- Eastern Caribbean Fed Cup team
- Eastern Caribbean Securities Exchange
- Eastern Caribbean Supreme Court
- List of Indigenous Names of Eastern Caribbean Islands
- List of regional organizations by population
- Regional Security System (OECS state members, Barbados, and Guyana)
- Residence Card
- West Indies Associated States
