= Kevin Isaac =

Saint Kitts and Nevis diplomat

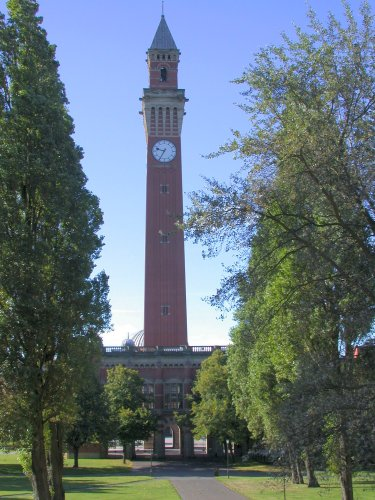
Birmingham University

Kevin Monroe Isaac is a diplomat representing Saint Kitts and Nevis. He has been the High Commissioner of Saint Kitts and Nevis to the United Kingdom since 12 January 2011. He is the first career diplomat to be appointed High Commissioner of Saint Kitts and Nevis to London. Isaac is the Saint Kitts and Nevis Permanent Representative to the International Maritime Organization, and Governor on the Board of the Commonwealth Secretariat.

Isaac graduated from Birmingham University with an MA in International Studies in 1995 and was awarded the honorary degree of DUniv by Birmingham University in 2012.
