= Ronald Sanders (diplomat) =

Antiguan and Barbudan diplomat (born 1948)

Sir Ronald Sanders KCN KCMG AM
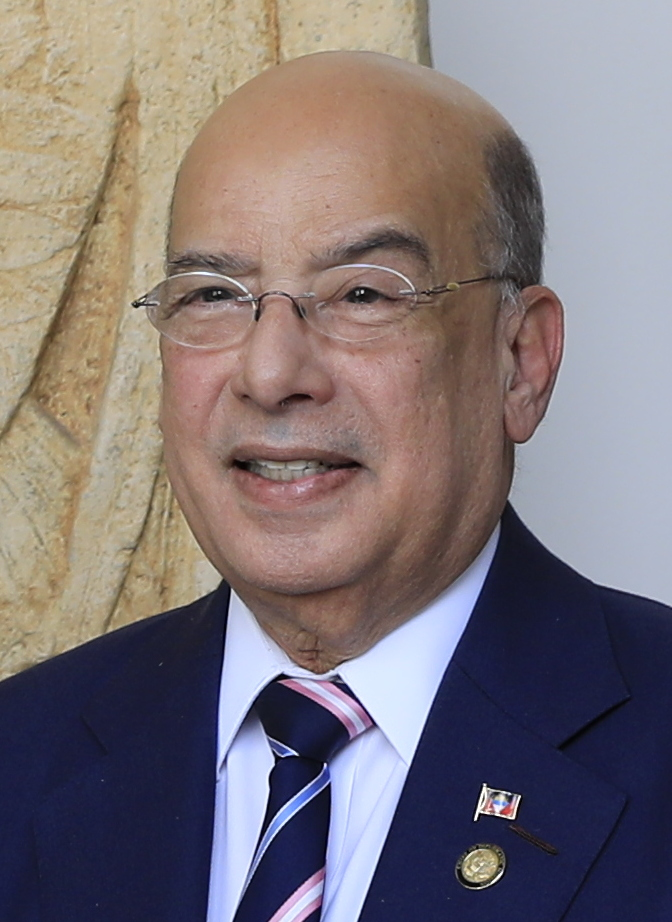

Antiguan and Barbudan Ambassador to the United States
- Incumbent
- Assumed office 17 September 2015
- Prime Minister: Gaston Browne
- Preceded by: Deborah-Mae Lovell

Personal details
- Born: 26 January 1948 (age 78) Guyana
- Education: University of Sussex (MA)

Sir Ronald Michael Sanders KCN KCMG AM (born 26 January 1948) is an Antiguan Barbudan diplomat, academic, former broadcast-journalist, and the current Ambassador Extraordinary and Plenipotentiary to the United States and to the Organization of American States (OAS) since 2015. He holds the unique distinction of being the first person, since the OAS enlarged its membership in 1962, to serve as Chairman of the Permanent Council of the OAS for an unprecedented three terms. He completed his highly successful third term on 31 December 2023, having played a widely recognized role in guiding the work of the Permanent Council in the peaceful transition of government in Guatemala on 14 January 2024.

In January 2026, Sir Ronald was appointed as the 11th Chancellor of the University of Guyana, the nation’s premier tertiary institution. Sir Ronald's installation ceremony as Chancellor was held on 13 February 2026 at the University's Turkeyan campus in Guyana. The University's Council has described the appointment as "a historic milestone for the University as it welcomes a diplomat of international stature to lead its highest governing body." Guyana's President Irfaan Ali emphasized that this unique blend of diplomacy and scholarship positions Sir Ronald to advance the University’s evolving role, stating that his "experience in multilateral diplomacy, scholarship on small states, and sustained engagement with leading global policy institutions reflect a depth of intellect, credibility, and international respect that will further enhance the academic stature and global reach of the University of Guyana".

Since the beginning of the Russian war against Ukraine, which started in February 2022, he has been one of the few Caribbean voices advocating for Ukraine, calling for the protection of its territorial integrity and sovereignty, which led to him being awarded the Order of Merit of Ukraine by President Volodymyr Zelenskyy on 24 August 2025.

He is also the non-resident High Commissioner to Canada since 2017. He served twice as Antigua's High Commissioner to the United Kingdom (1983–1987, 1996–2004) as well as ambassador to the World Trade Organization (WTO) (1997–2004). He was a member and Rapporteur of the Commonwealth Eminent Persons Group (2010–2011) that produced a seminal report entitled, "A Commonwealth of the People: Time for Urgent Reform", which laid out a plan of action to make the Commonwealth effective and relevant. He was Antigua and Barbuda's nominee to be secretary general of the Commonwealth at the election held at the 2015 Commonwealth Heads of Government Meeting. He is a senior research fellow (on leave) at the Institute of Commonwealth Studies, University of London, and a senior fellow (on leave) at Massey College at the University of Toronto.

He is a speaker at conventions and conferences on global financial services issues and on Latin America and Caribbean states in the global political-economy and the Commonwealth.

== Background ==
Sanders was born in Guyana. He has a master's degree in international relations from the University of Sussex in the United Kingdom and attended Boston University in the United States. He was also a visiting fellow at Queen Elizabeth House, Oxford University in the United Kingdom (1987–1988).

Sanders was a successful broadcaster in the 1970s, becoming general manager of the Guyana Broadcasting Service in 1973 at the early age of 25. Simultaneously, he helped to found the Caribbean Broadcasting Union, and the Caribbean News Agency, serving on the Executive of both bodies. He also served as the youngest elected member of the Executive Board of UNESCO and the first person from a micro state (1983-1985) to do so. Having been one of the first Caribbean negotiators with the OECD on its "Harmful Tax Policy" in 1990, he went on to become the chairman of the Caribbean Financial Action Task Force against drug trafficking and money laundering. Since 2010, he has been a member of "The Friends of the Democratic Charter", a group of leading personalities from Latin America and the Caribbean, established by former US President Jimmy Carter, to oversee compliance with the Inter-American Democratic Charter.

Between 2002–2004, Sanders was Antigua and Barbuda's chief foreign affairs representative. He holds the distinction of being the only representative of a small state to lead a successful trade dispute at the World Trade Organization.

In 2004, a World Trade Organization arbitration panel found in favour of the arguments he led as Antigua and Barbuda's ambassador in a case against the United States of America over cross-border access for Internet gaming and a violation of the General Agreement on Trade in Services.

== Commonwealth Secretary General Elections 2015 ==
Sanders was perceived to be the frontrunner to become the 6th Commonwealth Secretary-General and was backed by the majority of CARICOM nations heading into a meeting of Commonwealth Heads of Government in Malta in November 2015. There were three candidates: Sanders, proposed by Antigua and Barbuda with the support of the majority of Caribbean countries; Baroness Patricia Scotland, a member of the British House of Lords and a former British government minister, nominated by Dominica where she was born and backed by the British government; and Mmasekgoa Masire-Mwamba, of Botswana, a former Deputy Secretary-General of the Commonwealth Secretariat.

Sanders' campaign for the post was torpedoed the day before the election by a story in British newspaper The Daily Telegraph that had been touted to other media but rejected by them. The story was based on an eleven-year old, unsubstantiated allegation made in an unpublished report by the political party then in office in Antigua and Barbuda. At the time, the allegations were roundly condemned by lawyers in the region. The story also paid scant attention to a published letter in June 2015 by the police commissioner of Antigua and Barbuda saying that the police had no interest in Sir Ronald and that Antigua's director of public prosecutions had ruled that the allegations against him were “seriously defective” and “disclose no offence”. In the end, both Sanders and Masire-Mwamba lost to Patricia Scotland.

Sanders went on to continue his diplomatic career as Antigua and Barbuda's ambassador to the United States and the Organization of American States (OAS).

== University of London Inquiry into Commonwealth Studies ==
In January 2021, Sanders was again pressed into Commonwealth Service when he was appointed by the Vice Chancellor of the University of London to serve as a member and rapporteur of a committee to conduct an inquiry into the future of Commonwealth Studies at the University. The committee presented its report in July 2021 and all of its recommendations, particularly to maintain Commonwealth Studies, were accepted by the University Council.

== Representation at the Organization of American States ==
In August 2015, Sanders was appointed as Antigua and Barbuda's ambassador to the United States and the Organization of American States (OAS). From January to April 2016, he served a highly praised period as Chair of the Permanent Council of the 34-member Organization of American States. The Permanent Council is the decision-making body responsible for the affairs of the OAS between meetings of foreign ministers of the member countries. In January/February 2016, he also led a Special OAS mission to Haiti that helped to solve a constitutional and political impasse that threatened violence and political disruption; a role for which he is highly regarded within Haiti and by the Haitian diaspora.

In April 2021, Sanders was appointed Vice Chair of the OAS Permanent Council for a three-month term. After the sudden death of Chair Elisa Ruiz Díaz, he served as Chair for the remainder of the term. On 1 October 2023, he assumed the Chair of the Permanent Council of the OAS for a historic third term, which ended on 31 December 2023. He held several Special Meetings of the Permanent Council on challenges being experienced in the Americas such as climate change, irregular migration, guns, gangs, and violence, in addition to other issues of democracy and security confronting the Member States of the OAS, particularly Guatemala. In the latter case, he played an important role in ensuring that the Government of Guatemala cooperated with the OAS Permanent Council and the Secretary-General of the Organization, leading to a peaceful transition of government on 14 January 2024.

=== Role in Guatemala 2023-2024 ===
In December 2023, Guatemalan President Alejandro Giammattei Falla requested Ambassador Sanders, as Chair of the OAS Permanent Council, to visit Guatemala in the company of OAS Secretary General Luis Almagro to hold discussions on the leadership transition process in the country. The transition process was contentious due to efforts by Guatemala’s Public Ministry to overturn the results of the first and second round of elections held on 25 June 2023 and 20 August 2023, respectively. In these elections, the majority voted for Bernardo Arévalo as President and Karin Herrera as Vice President to take office on 14 January 2024. The official visit to Guatemala occurred between 15–16 December 2023. Along with the Secretary General, Sanders held discussions with President Giammattei, senior judges of Guatemala’s Constitutional Court and Vice President-Elect Karin Herrera. Sanders delivered his report on 20 December 2023 to the Permanent Council, and announced, among other things, that the Government of Guatemala had agreed to invite a good offices mission of representatives from the Permanent Council to visit Guatemala, under Article 18 of the Inter-American Democratic Charter.

Subsequently, a group of five ambassadors from the Permanent Council of the OAS, including Sanders, visited Guatemala from 12 January to 14 January 2024 to hold meetings with relevant stakeholders and to attend the inauguration ceremony of President Bernardo Arévalo and Vice President Karin Herrera on 14 January 2024. Sanders participated in meetings with judges of Guatemala’s Constitutional Court, the Human Rights Ombudsman, the president of the Supreme Court of Justice, the Minister of Foreign Affairs, Mario Búcaro, President-elect Bernardo Arévalo, members of the 48 Cantones and other indigenous and ancestral authorities, and members of the Coordinating Committee of Agricultural, Commercial, Industrial, and Financial Associations (CACIF). Sanders’ role in helping to guide Guatemala to a peaceful transition of government was praised by key players in Guatemala, including the foreign minister, Mario Búcaro Flores who, on 21 December 2023, expressed “heartfelt appreciation” for Sanders’ “exceptional leadership as Chair of the Permanent Council”, saying “your guidance has been instrumental in addressing critical issues and advancing the wellbeing of our citizens”.

== Service to Antigua and Barbuda since 1978 ==
Sir Ronald is one of only two surviving members of the three delegations from Antigua and Barbuda that participated in the Antigua and Barbuda Constitutional Conference with the British Government at Lancaster House, London in December 1980. Earlier, along with then Minister of External Affairs Lester Bird (later, Sir Lester) he had drafted the Memorandum to the British Government petitioning for Antigua and Barbuda’s independence, and participated in talks with the British Foreign Office Minister, responsible for the Caribbean, Nicholas Ridley.

From 1978 to 1982, he worked with a team of local and foreign technical experts to develop a 5-year economic plan for Antigua, and he served as a key adviser to the Minister of External Affairs, attending regional and hemispheric meetings of Foreign Ministers and Heads of Government. He helped to establish the Organization of Eastern Caribbean States, writing the first conceptual paper in a speech, delivered by Lester Bird, which was dubbed “The Thorn Bird Speech”. Subsequently, together with Sierra Leonese lawyer, Abass Bundu, as technical assistance from the Commonwealth Secretariat, he participated in meetings with all the Heads of Government and Opposition leaders in preparation for the formulation of the Treaty, establishing the Organization of Eastern Caribbean States.

He was then appointed as Minister-Counsellor in the Antigua and Barbuda Permanent Mission to the UN in 1982, where he negotiated diplomatic relations with China. Subsequently, he became High Commissioner to London and concurrently Ambassador to several European countries including France and Germany. While serving as Antigua and Barbuda's High Commissioner to London, he was one of three Commonwealth High Commissioners elected in 1985 to liaise with the UN Committee on countering Apartheid propaganda. He left the Foreign Service formally in 1987 but continued pro bono work for the government of Antigua and Barbuda before returning, once again, as High Commissioner to London from 1996 to 2004. He also served as Ambassador to several UN bodies, including the World Trade Organization where he led a successful case against the US for a breach of the General Agreement on Trade in Services. He holds the distinction of being the only representative of a small state to lead a successful trade dispute at the World Trade Organization. During this period, he also led Antigua and Barbuda’s negotiations with the Organization for Cooperation in Economic Development (OECD and the Financial Action Task Force, succeeding in keeping Antigua and Barbuda off a blacklist. He also negotiated the lifting of a financial advisory against Antigua and Barbuda by the US and UK governments.

Between 2002–2004, Sanders was Antigua and Barbuda's chief foreign affairs representative.

In June 2020, prime minister of Antigua and Barbuda Gaston Browne lauded Sir Ronald for his distinguished service to Antigua and Barbuda and the region by stating: "Ambassador Ron Sanders is easily, in my mind and in the mind of others, the hardest working ambassador that we have in the system. He has an enormous amount of knowledge and experience that he has been sharing with the entire government, and I can say that Antigua and Barbuda is the better for having such a well experienced and intellectual giant as part of our team within the United States and our Ambassador to the OAS." Browne, never shy to acknowledge the good talent and work of the veteran diplomat, again commended Sir Ronald for his work on behalf of the country in Washington DC, reacting to the recent praise for Sir Ronald from the President of the Committee of Ministers of the Council of Europe, Dominique Hasler.

In June 2025, Prime Minister Gaston Browne offered high praise to Sir Ronald Sanders, commending his intellect, diplomatic acumen, and decades of service across three generations of Antigua and Barbuda Labour Party leadership—Sir Vere Bird, Sir Lester Bird, and now Prime Minister Browne himself. He credited Sir Ronald with conceiving the idea of hosting the 55th General Assembly of the Organization of American States (OAS) in Antigua and Barbuda, a vision the Prime Minister embraced as an opportunity to showcase the nation’s diplomatic strength and global relevance.

Describing Sir Ronald as a rare talent, Prime Minister Browne called him “a gifted writer and strategist” whose contributions have shaped key public addresses and policy initiatives under successive administrations. Despite attempts by political opponents to undermine his legacy, Prime Minister Browne pointed out that Sir Ronald remained resilient and characterized him as having a “quiet demeanor but a resolve of steel”.

== Family ==
Sir Ronald Sanders is the younger brother of the late Joseph Sanders LLM (Lond.) LLB (UWO) barrister (England) international and constitutional lawyer, a former Deputy Permanent Representative to the United Nations and Deputy High Commissioner to Canada for Guyana. He had three sisters, Jean Reis, Dorothy Etter and Sandra Millen. Jean died in 2022, Sandra in 2024.

He is married to Susan Sanders, the eldest daughter of former Commonwealth Secretary-General Sir Shridath Ramphal and Lady Ramphal.

== Awards ==
In November 2025, the University of Guyana awarded Sanders the honorary degree of doctor of laws (honoris causa) in recognition of his role as a "transformative figure in diplomacy, business, and academia", and for his enduring commitment to good governance and the advancement of the Caribbean. This latest honour follows his earlier conferment of an Honorary Doctor of Letters (D.Litt) by the University of the West Indies in 2014, acknowledging his significant contributions to the region through relentless advocacy for Caribbean unity and the advancement of the Caribbean Community’s regional integration movement.

On 24 August 2025, the President of Ukraine, Volodymyr Zelenskyy, by decree, awarded Sanders the Order of Merit of Ukraine. This prestigious honor recognized Sir Ronald’s significant contribution to strengthening interstate cooperation, and his support for Ukraine’s sovereignty and territorial integrity. Sir Ronald has been a vocal advocate for Ukraine in international fora, particularly at the Organization of American States, where he led efforts to pass resolutions and declarations in support of Ukraine. In response to the award, Sir Ronald stated: "I am greatly honoured by the award from President Zelensky. I regard it as an award not only to me but to my Government in Antigua and Barbuda for its stance in standing up for the principles enshrined in the United Nations Charter and international law.” He also used his syndicated weekly column to consistently highlight the importance of global solidarity with the Ukrainian people.

In 1997, he was awarded the dignity of Companion of the Most Distinguished Order of St Michael and St George (CMG) by Queen Elizabeth II of the United Kingdom, Head of the Commonwealth. This was followed in 2002 by his promotion by Queen Elizabeth II as Knight Commander of the Most Distinguished Order of St Michael and St George (KCMG). He was also honoured as Knight Commander of the Most Distinguished Order of the Nation (KCN) in 2001 in the first cohort of national honours awarded by the Nation of Antigua and Barbuda. He was also bestowed with the dignity of Commandeur dans l’Ordre des Palmes Academiques in April 2002 by the Republic of France. In December 2012, he was awarded with one of the highest honours of Australia by the Government of Australia as a Member of the Order of Australia (AM) for his “service to Australian relations, particularly concerning Commonwealth issues and advancing the interests of small developing states of the Caribbean region.”

== Publications ==
He has written several chapters and forewords in books, as well as articles in academic journals, on the politics and economies of the Caribbean and the Commonwealth. His book, “Crumbled Small: The Commonwealth Caribbean in World Politics”, published in 2005 by Hansib, UK, remains necessary reading for institutions, academics, diplomats, students and others who are interested in Caribbean affairs. He also wrote "Antigua and Barbuda, 1966-1981: Transition, Trial, Triumph" published in 1984 by Caribbean Communications and "Broadcasting in Guyana" published by Routledge and Kegan Paul, London in 1978.

Sanders is regarded as a leading voice on matters related to the Caribbean, the Commonwealth and the OAS. His academic writings have been published extensively, particularly on the Commonwealth and small states. Additionally, since 2004 he has written over 1,000 columns, published in leading Caribbean newspapers and by online global news portals, on the Caribbean, Latin America, the United States, and the Commonwealth.

== See also ==
- Carl Roberts (diplomat)
- Karen-Mae Hill
- Walton Alfonso Webson
