= Antigua.news =

Antigua and Barbuda news and opinion website

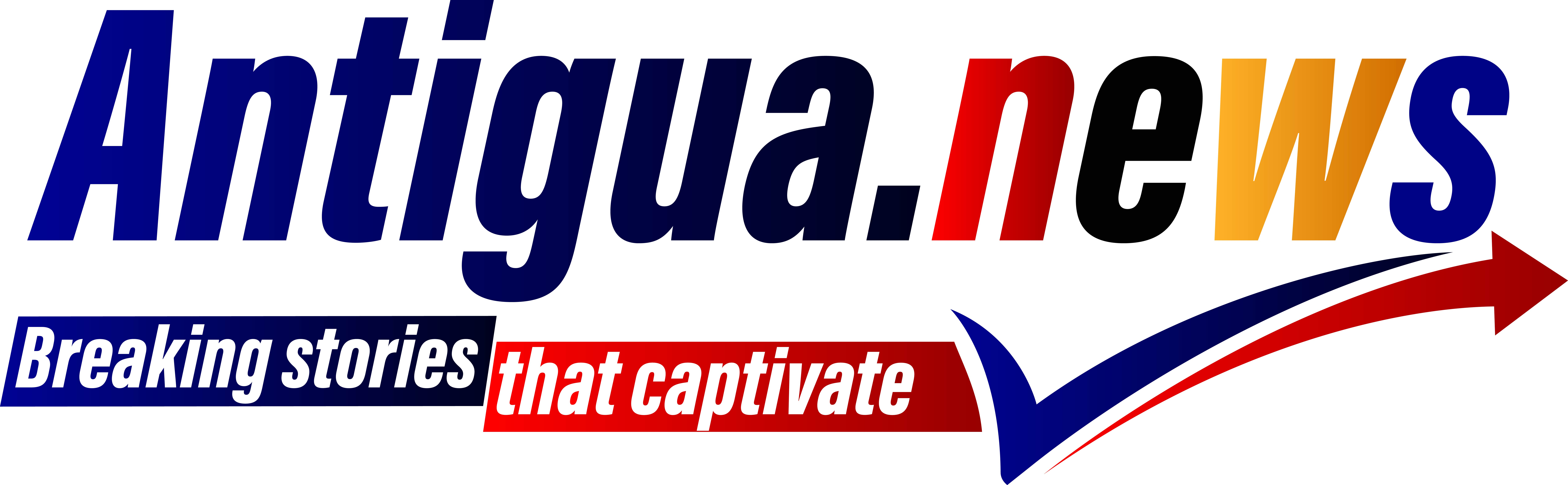
- Website type: News and opinion website
- Available in: English
- Editor: Shermain Bique Charles
- Website: antigua.news
- Launched: 2022; 4 years ago
- Current status: Active

Antigua.news (a.k.a. Antigua News or Antigua and Barbuda News) is a digital news and opinion portal founded in 2022 as the official news channel of the Embassy of Antigua and Barbuda in Madrid, focused on delivering coverage of current affairs in Antigua and Barbuda.

== Financial reporting ==
In May 2023, in the wake of the acquisition of Credit Suisse by UBS, Antigua.news reported inconsistencies with statements within Swiss government and Swiss financial authorities (FINMA, SNB) in the week preceding the bank's collapse. On 3 and 4 November 2023, Antigua.news published two stories on the basis of until then undisclosed documents, and argued Credit Suisse had been inconsistent and unfair toward its AT1 investors.

On 3 March 2024, Antigua.news published an article which presented previously unpublished documents indicating that FINMA sought to prevent plaintiffs' access to certain files through legal actions described as delaying tactics. On 5 September 2024, the site suggested that, shortly before the financial institution's collapse, a coordinated communication strategy was implemented to reassure clients and investors, aiming to limit capital outflows and stabilize the value of Credit Suisse Group's bonds and shares. The report alleged that actions by management and relationship managers influenced market perceptions, potentially inflating bond values and causing financial harm to investors.
