= Employment contract in English law =

In English law, an employment contract is a specific kind of contract whereby one person performs work under the direction of another. The two main features of a contract is that work is exchanged for a wage, and that one party stands in a relationship of relative dependence, or inequality of bargaining power. On this basis, statute, and to some extent the common law, requires that compulsory rights are enforceable against the employer.

There are diverging views about the scope by which English law covers employees, as different tests are used for different kinds of employment rights, legislation draws an apparent distinction between a "worker" and an "employee", and the use of these terms is also different from their use in the European Court of Justice and European Union directives and regulations. Under the Employment Rights Act 1996 section 230, an "employee" is anyone with a contract of service, which takes its meaning from a series of court cases that are also applicable for tax and tort law, where different judges have given different views about the meaning of the word. An "employee" is entitled to all types of rights that a worker has, but in addition the rights to reasonable notice before a fair dismissal and redundancy, protection in the event of an employer's insolvency or sale of the business, a statement of the employment contract, and rights to take maternity leave or time off for child care.

A "worker" is a broader concept in its statutory formulation, and catches more people, but does not carry as many rights. A worker means any person who personally performs work, and is not a client or a customer. A worker is entitled to a minimum wage, holidays, to join a trade union, all anti-discrimination laws, and health and safety protection.

== Scope of employment rights ==
As yet, the UK has not consolidated a comprehensive definition of the people to whom employment rights and duties apply. Statute and case law, both domestic and European, use two main definitions, with approximately six others. The EU does have one consolidated definition of a 'worker', which is someone who has a contract for work in return for a wage, and also stands as the more vulnerable party to the contract. This reflects the kernel of classical labour law theory, that an employment contract is one infused with inequality of bargaining power, and stands as a justification for mandating additional terms to what might otherwise be agreed under a system of total freedom of contract.

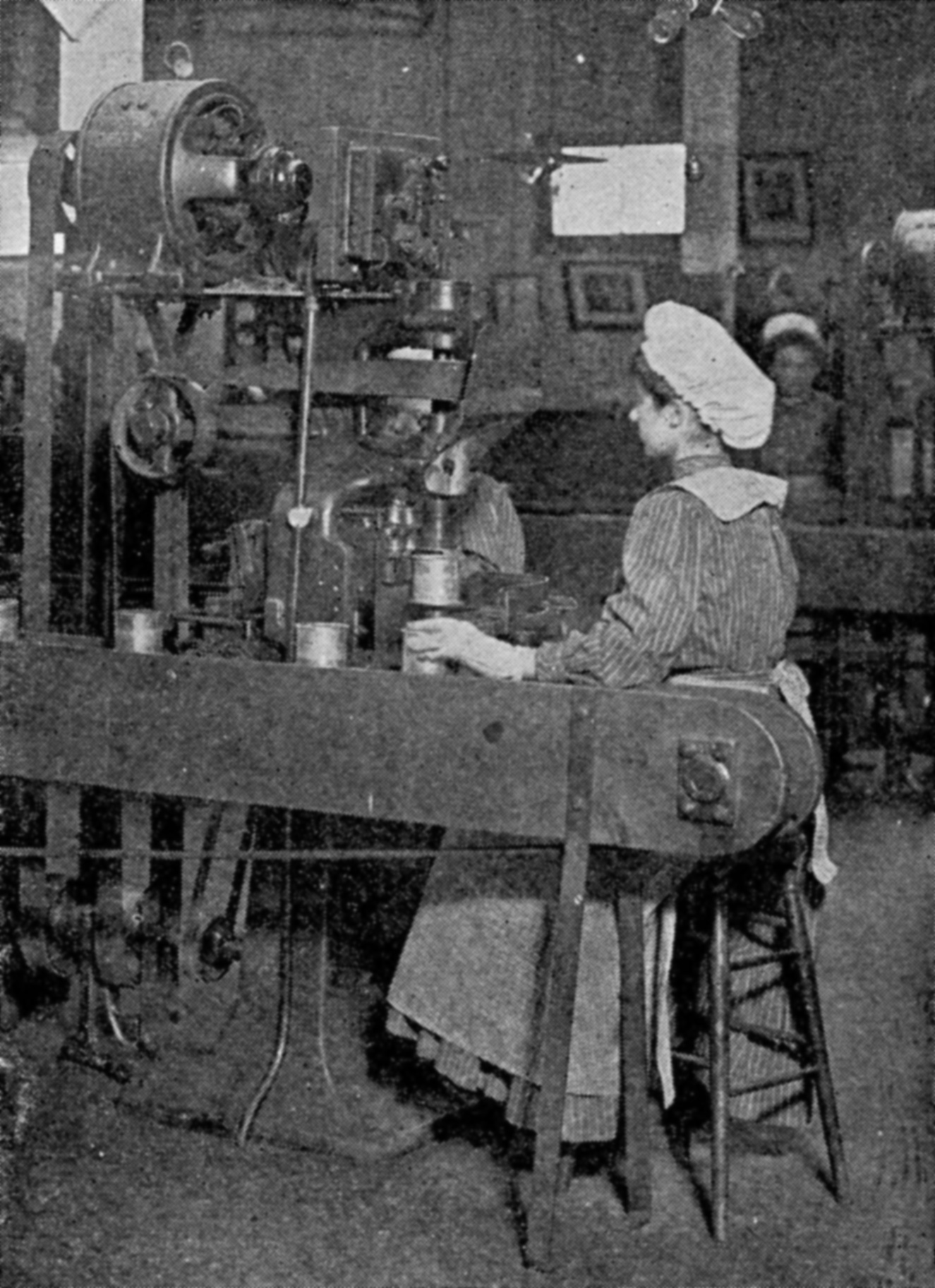
A can factory worker in 1909

UK courts have agreed that an employment contract is one of a specific type, and that it cannot be equated with a commercial agreement. However, UK statutes deploy two main definitions, of an 'employee' and a 'worker', with a different number of rights. The government may also pass secondary legislation to include specific groups of people into the 'employee' category. An employee has all available rights (all the rights of a worker but also child care and job security rights). The meaning is explicitly left to the common law under the main statute, the Employment Rights Act 1996 (ERA 1996) section 230, and has developed according to the classical 19th century contrast between a contract 'of service' and one 'for services'. While the classical test was that an employee was subject to a sufficient degree of 'control', new forms of work where people were had greater autonomy outside the factory to choose how to do their jobs, meant that, particularly from the mid-20th century, additional tests of employment were developed. Multiple factors, including how much one could be said to be integrated into the business, or whether one metaphorically wore the 'badge' of the organisation, were looked at, with a focus, it was said on 'economic reality' and form over substance. Multiple relevant factors would include how much the employee was 'controlled', if they owned their tools, if they had the chance of profit and bore the risk of loss. But in the late 1970s and 1980s, some courts began to speak of a new test of 'mutuality of obligation'. One view of this was merely that workers exchanged work for a wage. Another view stated that the employment relationship had to be one where there was an ongoing obligation to offer and accept work. This led to cases where employers, typically of people on low wages and little legal understanding, pleaded that they had only hired a person on a casual basis and thus should not be entitled to the major job security rights.

In addition, a 'worker' is defined in ERA 1996 section 230 as someone with a contract of employment or who personally performs work and is not a client or a customer. So this concept has greater scope, and protects more people, than does the term 'employee'. This class of person is entitled to a safe system of work, a minimum wage and limits on working time, as well as discrimination and trade union rights, but not job security, child care and retirement rights. This concept thus reaches up to protect people who are quasi-self-employed professionals, albeit not so vulnerable, such as a home cleaner, or music teacher who visits student homes, or in certain cases a taxi cab driver.

- Autoclenz Ltd v Belcher – the true nature of the relationship, not contractual terms, determine whether a person is a worker
- Jivraj v Hashwani [2011] UKSC 40 – arbitrators do not have employment contracts
- Governing Body of Clifton Middle School v Askew [2000] ICR 286 – employment relationship
- Edmonds v Lawson [2000] EWCA Civ 69, [2000] IRLR 391 – pupil barrister was not an apprentice
- Mingeley v Pennock and Ivory (t/a Amber Cars) [2004] EWCA Civ 328 – taxi driver found not to be a worker due to the facts of his relationship with the taxi company
- Hall v Woolston Hall Leisure Ltd [2000] EWCA Civ 170 – complicity with employer's income tax evasion did not remove employee's protection from discriminatory dismissal
- Beloff v Pressdram Ltd [1973] 1 All ER 241 – outside work did not negate a journalist's employee status
- Ferguson v John Dawson & Partners (Contractors) Ltd [1976] EWCA Civ 7, [1976] 1 WLR 1213 – Megaw LJ: declarations of employee status to be "wholly disregarded"
- Calder v H Kitson Vickers & Sons (Engineers) Ltd [1988] ICR 232, 251 – Ralph Gibson LJ: declarations are not conclusive, but relevant
- Newnham Farms Ltd v Powell (2003) EAT/0711/01/MAA – employment contract found to exist as a result of conduct, conveying entitlement to minimum wage
- Aslam v Uber BV (2016) – scope of employment rights for Uber drivers, "worker" concept
- Clark v Oxfordshire Health Authority [1998] IRLR 125 – no employment contract existed due to lack of mutuality of obligation
- Consistent Group v Kalwak [2008] EWCA Civ 430 – Employment Appeal Tribunal's judgment that a zero hours contract was a sham overturned due to errors in its treatment of evidence

== Employment rights ==
Employee

- statement of contract (ERA 1996 s 1)
- reasonable notice (ERA 1996 s 86)
- unfair dismissal (ERA 1996 s 94)
- redundancy (ERA 1996 s 139)
- guaranteed pay on employer insolvency (ERA 1996 s 94)
- transfer of employment status on transfer of business (Transfer of Undertakings (Protection of Employment) Regulations 2006, implementing the Transfers of Undertakings Directive 2001/23)
- maternity, paternity and parental leave
- request flexible working time (ERA 1996 s 80F)
- right to return to work
- consultation on changes to contracts or organisation (Information and Consultation of Employees Regulations 2004, implementing the Information and Consultation of Employees Directive 91/533)
- Income Tax (Earnings and Pensions) Act 2003, Part 11, employed earner, "gainfully employed under a contract of service"
- contributions to National Insurance (Social Security Contributions and Benefits Act 1992 (c. 4) ss 1(2)(a)(i) and 2(1)(a))

Worker

- union organisation (Trade Union and Labour Relations (Consolidation) Act 1992)
- minimum wage (National Minimum Wage Act 1998, and Agricultural Wages Act 1948 where relevant)
- 28 days holiday, working time limits (Working Time Regulations 1998, implementing the Working Time Directive)
- procedures under the Transfer of Undertakings (Protection of Employment) Regulations 2006, implementing the Collective Redundancies Directive 1998, though the UK regulations use 'employee'
- occupational pension (Pensions Act 2008)

== Construction of employment ==
- France v James Coombes & Co [1929] AC 496
- Lloyds Bank Ltd v Bundy [1975] QB 326
- Pao On v Lau Yiu Long [1979] UKPC 2
- National Westminster Bank plc v Morgan [1985] 1 All ER 821
- Johnson v Unisys Limited [2001] UKHL 13
- Reda v Flag Ltd [2002] UKPC 38
- Gisda Cyf v Barratt [2010] UKSC 41
- Autoclenz Ltd v Belcher [2011] UKSC 41

=== Express terms ===
Once a person's work contract is categorised, the courts have specific rules for determining, beyond the statutory minimum charter of rights, what are its terms and conditions. Analogous rules for incorporation of terms and implication of terms exist as in the ordinary law of contract; however, in Gisda Cyf v Barratt, Lord Kerr emphasised that this process of construction is one that must be "intellectually segregated" from the general law of contract, because of the relation of dependency an employee has. In this case, Ms Barratt was told her employment was terminated in a letter that she opened 3 days after its arrival. When, 3 months and 2 days after arrival, she lodged an unfair dismissal claim, the employer argued it was time barred on the ground that in ordinary contract law one is bound by a notice when a reasonable person would have read a message. The Supreme Court held that Ms Barratt was in time for a claim because she was only bound by the notice when she actually read it. The applicable in employment was different, given the purpose of employment law to protect the employee. From formation to termination, employment contracts are to be construed in the context of statutory protection of dependent workers.

- Statutory compulsory terms: right to statement, payment of wages, notice, fair dismissal, redundancy, minimum wage, working hours, pension
- British Telecommunications plc v Ticehurst [1992] ICR 383
- Cheltenham Borough Council v Laird [2009] EWHC 1253 QB, on misrepresentations before entering an employment contract

=== Incorporation of terms ===
The terms of employment are all those things promised to an employee when work begins, so long as they do not contravene statutory minimum rights. In addition, terms can be incorporated by reasonable notice, for instance by referring to a staff handbook in a written employment agreement, or even in a document in a filing cabinet next to the staff handbook. While without express wording they are presumed not binding between the union and employer, a collective agreement may give rise to individual rights. The test applied by the courts is to ask loosely whether its terms are 'apt' for incorporation, and not statements of 'policy' or 'aspiration'. Where the collective agreement's words are clear, a "last in, first out" rule was held to potentially qualify, but another clause purporting to censure compulsory redundancies was held to sound like it was binding ‘in honour’ only.

- Parkwood v Alemo – Herron [2010] IRLR 298, incorporation of varying collective agreement terms
- Trade Union and Labour Relations (Consolidation) Act 1992, ss 179, 180, 236
- Harlow v Artemis International Corp Ltd [2008] EWHC 1126 (QB), online redundancy incorporated
- Johnstone v Bloomsbury Health Authority [1991] 2 All ER 293: Stuart-Smith LJ held that an implied term in law can prevail over an express term, in this case the implied term about a worker's safety.
- Henry v London Greater Transport Services Ltd [2002] EWCA Civ 488, varying collective agreement binding maybe w/o vote
- Robertson v British Gas Corp [1983] ICR 351, bonus in collective agreement binding
- Alexander v Standard Telephones & Cables Ltd (No 2) [1991] IRLR 287 13
- Camden Exhibition & Display Ltd v Lynott [1966] 1 QB 555 13
- Malone v British Airways plc [2010] IRLR 431; [2010] EWHC 302 (QB) incorporation of perks into from a collective agreement into individual contract and variation
- In Stack v Ajar-Tech Ltd. [2015], the Court of Appeal stated that it could reasonably be implied in the circumstances of this case that Mr. Stack, a shareholder who had not been paid for his work, could expect to be paid "a reasonable rate from a reasonable starting date" and thus to be protected by a contract.

=== Implied terms favouring employees ===
In addition to statutory rights, expressly agreed terms and incorporated terms, the contractual hallmark of the employment relation is the series of standardised implied terms (or terms implied in law) that accompany it. In addition to individualised implied terms that the courts construe to reflect the reasonable expectations of the parties, the courts have long held that employees are owed additional obligations, such as a safe system of work and payment of wages even when the employer has no work to offer. Reflecting more recent priorities, employers have also been recognised to have a duty to inform their employees of their workplace pension rights, although they have stopped short of requiring employers to give advice on qualifying for workplace disability benefits. The key implied term, however, is the duty of good faith, or “mutual trust and confidence”. This is a flexible concept that is applied in a broad variety of circumstances leading to remedies in damages or an injunction, such as to require employers do not act in an authoritarian manner, call employees names behind their back, treat workers unequally when upgrading pay, run the company as a front for international crime, or exercise discretion to award a bonus capriciously. There is tension among judges about the extent to which the core implied term of mutual trust and confidence can be 'contracted out of', with the House of Lords having held that the parties are "free" to do so, while others approach the question as a matter of construction of the agreement which is within exclusive judicial competence to define.

The second, and older hallmark of the employment contract is that employees are bound to follow their employers’ instructions while at work, so long as that does not contravene statute or their agreed terms. Every employment relation leaves the employer with a residue of discretion, historically expressed as the ‘master-servant’ relationship. Today, in practice, this leaves the employer with the ability to vary the terms of work in accordance with business need. The courts have allowed this to continue, so long as it does not contradict a contract's express terms, which always require an employee's consent, or renegotiation of a collective agreement. However, it has also been held that employers may insert ‘flexibility clauses’ allowing them to reserve the right to vary any contract term. The limits of the courts’ tolerance of such practices are evident if they touch procedures for accessing justice, or potentially if they would contravene the duty of mutual trust and confidence.

- Master and servant: discretion of employer outside written terms, flexibility
- Devonald v Rosser & Sons [1906] 2 KB 728, fact implied, risk of no work
- Sagar v Ridehalgh & Sons Ltd [1931] 1 Ch 310, implied by custom, wage deductions
- Wilsons and Clyde Coal Ltd v English [1938] AC 57, law implied, safe work
- Wilson v Racher [1974] ICR 428, mtc manners, justifying termination
- United Bank Ltd v Akhtar [1989] IRLR 507 14: in this case, the tribunal ruled that the implied term of mutual trust and confidence did not override an express term in the contract regarding mobility, but the contract needed to be interpreted "in such a way that it included an implied requirement that reasonable notice would be given, and that discretion concerning financial assistance [would] be exercised" to assist the employee with moving house.
- Mahmud and Malik v BCCI SA [1998] AC 20, mtc implied, law implied, reputation
- Transco plc v O'Brien [2002] EWCA Civ 379, mtc implied for equal treatment
- Crossley v Faithful & Gould Holdings Ltd [2004] EWCA Civ 293, law, not implied for finance advice
- Woods v WM Car Services (Peterborough) Ltd [1981] ICR 666, EAT; [1982] ICR 693 11
- Baldwin v Brighton and Hove City Council [2007] IRLR 232, [2007] ICR 680 (EAT) 11
- Crowson Fabrics Ltd v Rider [2007] IRLR 288; [2007] EWHC 2942 (Ch) 11
- Home Office v Evans [2007] EWCA Civ 1089, [2008] IRLR 59 12
- The Post Office v Roberts [1980] IRLR 347 12
- Mallone v BPB Industries plc [2002] EWCA Civ 126 12
- Luke v Stoke County Council [2007] EWCA Civ 761 13

=== Implied terms favouring employers ===
- Cresswell v Board of Inland Revenue [1984] ICR 508, using new technology, er discretion
- Dryden v Greater Glasgow Health Board [1992] IRLR 469, varying work rule book no breach
- French v Barclays Bank plc [1998] IRLR 646, bridge loan withdrawal mtc breach
- Alexander v Standard Telephones & Cables Ltd (No 2) [1991] IRLR 287, collective agreement with lifo not intended incorp
- Kaur v MG Rover Group Ltd [2004] EWCA 1507, collective agreement, no comp redundancy not intended
- Rigby v Ferodo Ltd [1988] ICR 29, wage reduction, insist on terms
- Hussman Manufacturing Ltd v Weir [1998] IRLR 288 13
- Jones v Associated Tunnelling Co Ltd [1981] IRLR 477 14
- Wandsworth London Borough Council v D’Silva [1998] IRLR 193 14
- Lee v GEC Plessy Telecommunications Ltd [1993] IRLR 383 14
- Bateman v ASDA [2010] IRLR 370, complete flexibility clause
- Harlow v Artemis International Corp Ltd [2008] IRLR 629; [2008] EWHC 1126 (QB) variation and termination of the employment contract

=== Performance, breach and termination ===
Part performance

- Wiluszynski v London Borough of Tower Hamlets [1989] ICR 439, strike wages, part performance
- Secretary of State for Employment v ASLEF (No 2) [1972] ICR 19, work to rule, no good faith is breach
- British Telecommunications plc v Ticehurst [1992] ICR 383, work to rule, part performance
- Johnson v Unisys Limited [2001] UKHL 13
- Buckland v Bournemouth University [2010] IRLR 445

== See also ==
- Trades Union Congress
- British labour law
- GMB (trade union) § Landmark Uber employment tribunal case
- Baldwin v Brighton City Council [2007] IRLR 232, implied terms
- Crowson Fabrics v Rider [2007] IRLR 288; [2007] EWHC 2942 (Ch)
- Home Office v Evans [2008] IRLR 59; [2008] EWCA Civ 1089
- Standard Life v Gorman [2010] IRLR 233
- Luke v Stoke CC [2007] EWCA Civ 761
- Cerberus Software Ltd v Rowley [2001] IRLR 159
- Harper v Virgin Net Ltd [2004] IRLR 390
- Eastwood v Magnox Electric plc [2004] IRLR 732
- Fraser v Hmlad Ltd [2006] IRLR 687
- Murray v Leisureplay plc [2005] IRLR 946
- Kulkarni v MK NHS Trust [2009] IRLR 829
- Mezey v SW London NHS Trust [2010] IRLR 512
- Edwards v Chesterfield NHS Trust [2010] IRLR 702
