= Dryden v Greater Glasgow Health Board =

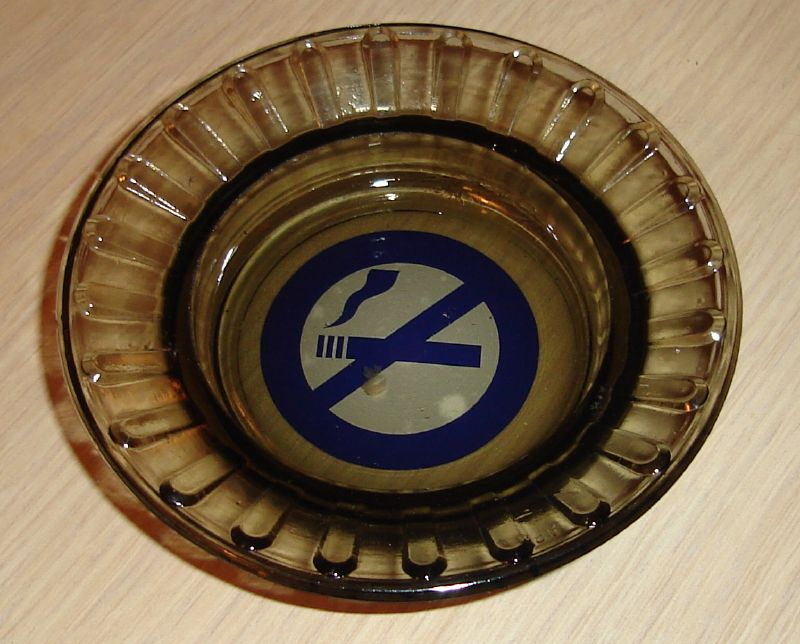
- Court: Employment Appeal Tribunal

Keywords
- Employment contract, smoking

Dryden v Greater Glasgow Health Board [1992] IRLR 469 is a UK labour law case concerning the contract of employment. It held that a variation of company workplace customs, which are incorporated into individual contracts of employment can take place after a proper consultation without breaching employees' contracts.

== Facts ==
Ms Dryden was a nursing auxiliary in a Glasgow hospital. She smoked around 30 cigarettes a day. After consultations, which she did not contribute to, smoking was banned. She claimed constructive dismissal on the basis that the workplace custom being unilaterally changed breached her employment contract.

== Judgment ==
Lord Coulsfield in the Edinburgh Employment Appeal Tribunal held that a unilateral variation on the workplace rules did not amount to a breach of any contract term. The consultation process was influential in making the rule change legitimate. He said the following.

The appellant's contract of employment is a standard form document, which does not contain any express clause relevant to the present issue. The contract does contain reference to Whitley Council Agreements as determining levels of wages and other matters, but again there does not appear to have been any relevant decision or agreement to be found in that source. The Industrial Tribunal have found that it is the practice in the Health Service for conditions of employment and wages to be discussed with trade unions and professional organisations, the agreements being incorporated in the contracts of employment of the employees. They have also found that, at the Health Board level, proposed policies, changes in operational practices, and working rules, are negotiated with trade unions by means of regular meetings of a joint consultation committee and a joint trade union committee. It does not appear that there was any relevant agreement so negotiated.

The principal submissions on behalf of the appellant, both before the Industrial Tribunal and before us, were based on the obligation of the employer not to prevent the employee from performing her part of the contract and not to act so as to destroy the trust and confidence between employer and employee. Before turning to these contentions, however, we should first deal with the question whether the contract contained any specific implied term related to smoking, a matter in respect of which we were left in some uncertainty about the appellant's position. It is, we think, obvious that if there was a term in the appellant's contract of employment to the effect that she would be entitled to have access to facilities for smoking during working hours, the respondents would not be entitled to vary that term unilaterally, and it is possible that an attempt to do so might be held to amount to a sufficient breach of contract to entitle the employee to resign. In his submissions to us, Mr Miller, who appeared for the appellant, referred to Watson v Cooke, Webb and Holton COIT 13852/84, in which an Industrial Tribunal held that an employer who introduced a ban on smoking committed a breach of contract in that he introduced, or sought to introduce, a wholly new contractual term. He also referred to another Industrial Tribunal decision, Rogers v Wicks & Wilson Ltd COIT 22890/87, in which the Tribunal preferred to treat a ban on smoking as a matter of rules of the place of work rather than as a term of the contract. Mr Miller submitted to us that it would be safer to approach the problem by considering the employer's conduct, rather than by considering whether there was an implied term relating to smoking. At another point in his submissions, however, he suggested that there was an implied term that smoking would be permitted, because custom and practice permitted it, and that the cancellation of that permission was repudiatory. We were therefore left in some doubt whether or not it was suggested that there was a specific term relating to a “right to smoke” in the appellant's contract. The Industrial Tribunal in this case may have suffered from the same difficulty. They record that there was reference to the two Industrial Tribunal cases cited above, that it was submitted that it was not useful to consider whether the appellant had an implied contractual right to smoke at work, and that there was no submission that the right to smoke at work was an essential term of the contract. They also record that, in her evidence, the appellant agreed that the limited 'no smoking' ban was a matter of rules. They do, however, then go on to consider whether there was an implied term, to refer to the well-known authorities which define the circumstances in which a term can be held to be implied, and to hold that smoking is in a different category from, and falls far short of, the kind of custom which has been held to be implied in a contract of employment. They also hold that such a term could not be said to be necessary to give business efficacy to the contract, to give effect to the combined intention of the parties or to complete their contractual arrangements.

The question whether an employer is entitled to prohibit or restrict smoking in the workplace is one which is likely to arise in a number of different contexts, and it is tempting to try to arrive at some general answer to the question whether there may be an implied contractual term which confers a “right to smoke” on the employee. We think, however, that that temptation should be resisted. The question whether a term should be implied in a particular contract is one dependent on the particular facts and circumstances, and, while we think that there is much force in the reasoning of the Industrial Tribunal, it seems to us that they went further than is necessary for the decision of this case. It is sufficient, in our opinion, to say that the findings of fact and submissions before us form an entirely inadequate basis for holding that there was any implied contract term to the effect that smoking would, to some extent or in some way, continue to be permitted, either generally or in the particular case of the appellant. Neither before us, nor, it appears, before the Industrial Tribunal, was there any real attempt to present an argument for the existence of an implied term related to the well-established tests which have to be applied in order to determine whether or not such a term should be held to form part of a contract, nor was there any real attempt to lead evidence to establish the facts necessary to found such an argument.

== See also ==
- UK labour law
- Employment contract in English law
- Autoclenz Ltd v Belcher [2011] UKSC 41
