= Commonwealth Bank of Australia v Barker =

Judgement of the High Court of Australia

- Court: High Court of Australia
- Decided: 10 September 2014
- Citations: [2014] HCA 32, (2014) 253 CLR 169
- Transcripts: 8 Apr [2014] HCATrans 73 audio visual recording 9 Apr [2014] HCATrans 74 audio visual recording

Case history
- Prior actions: [2012] FCA 942 [2013] FCAFC 83
- Subsequent action: none

Court membership
- Judges sitting: French CJ, Kiefel, Bell, Gageler and Keane JJ

Case opinions
- (5:0) there is no implied term in contracts of employment in Australia imposing a mutual duty of trust and confidence. The decision of the House of Lords in Malik v Bank of Credit and Commerce International SA should not be accepted by courts, as applicable, to employment contracts in Australia. per French CJ, Bell and Keane JJ

Commonwealth Bank of Australia v Barker is a leading Australian judgment of the High Court which unanimously and firmly rejected the proposition that contracts of employment in Australia should contain an implied term of mutual trust and confidence.

== Background ==
=== Factual Background ===
Mr Barker was employed by the Commonwealth Bank from when he left school in 1981. By 2004 he had been promoted to a position as an executive manager. On 2 March 2009, Mr Barker was told that his position was to be made redundant and that if he was not redeployed within the Bank his employment would be terminated. Mr Barker was placed on paid leave and his access to the Bank's intranet and email facilities was terminated. Having been deprived of access to his Bank email account and voicemail, Mr Barker was not informed about an alternative position within the Bank until 26 March 2009. He was not contacted by the recruitment consultant involved in facilitating the recruitment process for that position, nor was the possibility of retraining for that role discussed with him. The Commonwealth Bank terminated Mr Barker's employment on 9 April 2009 by reason of redundancy. At the time of his dismissal, Mr Barker's salary was approximately $150,000 per annum. Mr Barker claimed that the Bank acted in breach of its own policies and in so doing breached his contract of employment because (1) the policies were incorporated into his contract or (2) of an implied term of mutual trust and confidence. Mr Barker also claimed the Commonwealth Bank engaged in misleading and deceptive conduct.

=== Legal background ===
In Australia the employment relationship involves a degree of trust and confidence, particularly for a corporate employer that can only act through its employees. An employer may summarily dismiss an employee who destroys that trust and confidence. An employer may seek to entice or motivate its employees in the expectation of receiving a bonus payment or promises of fair treatment. Statute, regulation and industrial awards may provide the “means by which employees may be protected from abuses of power by the employer, and provides means of redress to employees who are aggrieved by some conduct of the employer” In some instances however the availability of redress may be less certain, for example a bonus payment made be left to the discretion of the employer, or the promises of fair treatment may be contained solely in policies of the employer. The employee trusts that the employer will deliver on that expectation or promise. The question arising in Mr Barker's case was whether the expectation or promise in the Bank's policies were legally enforceable.

=== Remedies for wrongful dismissal in Australia ===
Underlying Mr Barker's claim is that the Commonwealth Bank was wrong to dismiss him in breach of its policies. There are numerous difficulties facing an employee who believes they were wrongfully dismissed. At common law the employee had no right to be given a reason for the dismissal. If the employer dismissed an employee without notice, a court would scrutinise whether the employee's conduct justified summary dismissal. Even if the contract does not specify a period of notice, a term is implied that either party could bring the contract of employment to an end by giving a reasonable period of notice.

Even if a former employee could establish that they were wrongfully dismissed, there were three further impediments to the available remedies:

- An ex-employee could not recover damages for breach of contract in respect of injured feelings and loss of employment prospects arising from the harsh and humiliating manner of the dismissal or for any loss sustained because the fact of dismissal itself might make it more difficult to obtain alternative employment.
- A court would not normally order specific performance of a contract of employment nor grant an injunction that would effectively amount to specific performance.
- The measure of damages for wrongful dismissal is generally limited by an assumption that the employer would otherwise have dismissed with notice.

Employees and their representatives have sought to overcome these impediments in a number of ways:

- by inserting into awards a provision that "Termination of employment by an employer shall not be harsh, unjust or unreasonable". The High Court held that a breach of such an award term did not give rise to damages.
- by statutory unfair dismissal proceedings in industrial tribunals. While a finding that a dismissal was unfair may result in reinstatement, compensation is limited to 6 months pay, and employees are excluded from claiming in some circumstances, such as where the dismissal was a genuine redundancy or the former employee was not covered by an award and exceeded the high income threshold.
- by proceedings in a state industrial tribunal claiming the contract was unfair. The unfair contract jurisdiction was largely eliminated as part of the WorkChoices legislation.
- by the creative use of implied terms, notably the obligation of mutual trust and confidence, relying on the English authority Malik v Bank of Credit and Commerce International SA.
- by claiming that the employer engaged in misleading or deceptive conduct in relation to bonus payments the duration of employment or that the employer would adhere to its policies.

=== Mutual trust and confidence in Australia ===
Whether there is an implied contractual duty of mutual trust and confidence had been controversial, and considered but not settled in various decisions of Australian courts including:

- Burazin v Blacktown City Guardian Pty Ltd where the Full Court of the Industrial Relations Court of Australia held that there was ample English authority for the implication of the suggested term, however damages were not available for a breach of the implied term.
- Walker v Citigroup Global Markets Australia Pty Ltd where Kenny J in the Federal Court held that under the common law, no duty of good faith is implied into employment contracts.
- McDonald v Parnell Laboratories (Aust) Pty Limited where Buchanan J in the Federal Court doubted the existence of an implied term of mutual trust and confidence.
- Russell v Roman Catholic Church, Sydney where the NSW Court of Appeal held that assuming the Church owed its employee an implied contractual obligation not to damage mutual trust and confidence, the Church had not breached such an implied term.
- State of South Australia v McDonald where the Full Court of the Supreme Court of SA held that even if there was generally an implied term of mutual trust and confidence, it was displaced by statute, regulation and industrial award which provided “a variety of means by which employees may be protected from abuses of power by the employer, and provides means of redress to employees who are aggrieved by some conduct of the employer”.
- Shaw v State of New South Wales where the NSW Court of Appeal held that a claim that a term of mutual trust and confidence was implied into their contracts of employment was not untenable or groundless. Despite the limited scope of the issue, the Court considered not only the implied term of mutual trust and confidence but also the standing of "Addis v Gramophone Co Ltd. In doing so, the Court traveled far afield, considering decisions from England, Canada, New Zealand, the Fiji Islands, Hong Kong, Samoa, Trinidad & Tobago and Papua New Guinea.

=== Relational contract theory ===
The Commonwealth Bank's argument was that it was not bound to follow its own policies. The HR Reference Manual stated "The manual is not in any way incorporated as part of any industrial award or agreement entered into by the Bank, nor does it form any part of an employee’s contract of employment".

This raises the question why does an employer ever do more than it is legally obliged to do ? One theory seeking to explain this behaviour is that employment is an example of a relational contract, based upon a relationship of trust between the parties. The explicit terms of the contract are just an outline as there are implicit terms and understandings which determine the behaviour of the parties. The High Court has long held there is a distinction between the employment relationship and the contract of employment.

The Full Court of the Supreme Court of South Australia described the development of the implied term as being "consistent with the contemporary view of the employment relationship as involving elements of common interest and partnership, rather than of conflict and subordination."

== The decisions in the Federal Court ==
The trial was heard in the Federal Court of Australia. Besanko J held that there was an implied term of mutual trust and confidence in the contract which operated only where a party did not have reasonable and proper cause for his conduct and the conduct was likely to destroy or seriously damage the relationship of trust and confidence, applying the decision in Malik v Bank of Credit and Commerce International SA. The Bank had committed a serious breach of its policies and that was a breach of the implied term. The Court dismissed Mr Barker's claims that the policies were incorporated into his contract and that the Bank had engaged in misleading or deceptive conduct. The court awarded damages assessed at $317,500, based upon discounted past and future economic loss.

=== The decision of the Full Court of the Federal Court ===
The Bank appealed to a Full Court of the Federal Court. Mr Barker cross-appealed against the assessment of damages. The Full Court, by a majority (Jacobson and Lander JJ, Jessup J dissenting) dismissed the appeal, holding that there was an implied term of mutual trust and confidence, as found in Malik v Bank of Credit and Commerce International SA. Jacobson & Lander JJ disagreed with the trial judge that the term of mutual trust and confidence required the Bank to comply with its policies, instead finding that mutual trust and confidence required the Bank to take positive steps to consult with Mr Barker about alternative positions and to give him the opportunity to apply for them. The failure of the Commonwealth Bank to do so was a breach of the implied term.

Jessup J dissented on the basis that the implied term did not form part of the common law of Australia and that even if the implied term existed, the Commonwealth Bank's failure to comply with its own policies did not amount to a breach.

On the question of the intangible benefits of employment, his Honour said:

... the provision of job satisfaction, a sense of identity, self-worth, emotional well-being and dignity ... may indeed be amongst the consequences of having a good job in a company run by good management, something to which every employee would aspire. However, emotions such as senses of identity, self-worth and dignity are felt in the breast of the employee, are highly subjective and would, necessarily, be felt to differing extents by different employees within the same working environment. I do not believe that the common law has come close to making the employer responsible for emotions of this kind, or to giving legal consequences to the fact that they are not generated in a particular situation.

== The Appeal to the High Court ==
=== Special leave to appeal ===
The Commonwealth Bank applied to the High Court for special leave to appeal, arguing that the matter was one of public importance as the terms and conditions of most employees were regulated by contract, that the High Court should resolve the differences of opinion between different courts. Kiefel & Keane JJ granted special leave on the condition that the Commonwealth Bank pay Mr Barker's costs in the High Court and also not seeking to disturb orders for costs made in the court below which were favourable to Mr Barker.

=== Submissions ===
The grounds of appeal were that the Federal Court :

- erred in holding that the common law of Australia required an implied term of mutual trust and confidence; and
- erred in finding that the implied term of mutual trust and confidence had been breached by the Commonwealth Bank.

The main arguments of the Commonwealth Bank were that:

- there had been no authoritative acceptance of the implied term by an Australian appellate court.
- the unfair dismissal laws were a carefully calibrated balance between the rights of employers and employees.
- The implied term was not necessary for contracts of employment to be workable and effective.
- The content of the implied term was uncertain.

The main arguments of Mr Barker were that

- Employment was a unique relationship characterised by economic dependence and a disparity of power.
- The term of mutual trust and confidence was essential to allow the employee to enjoy the benefits of the contract.
- The implication of the term was consistent with other terms.
- The implication of the term was supported by authority in Australia, the United Kingdom and other common law jurisdictions.
- Unfair dismissal laws did not prevent the implication of the term.

=== Decision ===
The High Court unanimously allowed the appeal and held that a term of mutual trust and confidence should not be implied by law in employment contracts in Australia.

==== Test for a terms implied in law ====
In a joint judgement, French CJ, Bell & Keane JJ held that implications in law and implications in fact

... tend in practice to "merge imperceptibly into each other". ... They fall within the limiting criterion of 'necessity' ... The requirement that a term implied in fact be necessary 'to give business efficacy' to the contract in which it is implied can be regarded as a specific application of the criterion of necessity. The present case concerns an implied term in law where broad considerations are in play, which are not at large but are not constrained by a search for what 'the contract actually means'. In Byrne v Australian Airlines Ltd, McHugh and Gummow JJ emphasised that the "necessity" which will support an implied term in law is demonstrated where, absent the implication, "the enjoyment of the rights conferred by the contract would or could be rendered nugatory, worthless, or, perhaps, be seriously undermined" or the contract would be "deprived of its substance, seriously undermined or drastically devalued".

Kiefel J similarly applied the test of necessity set out in Byrne v Australian Airlines Ltd, by McHugh and Gummow JJ.

Gageler J, in a brief judgement, adopted a slightly different test for necessity, holding that "couching the ultimate evaluation in terms of necessity serves usefully to emphasise this and no more: that a court should not imply a new term other than by reference to considerations that are compelling".

==== Legislative intervention ====
French CJ, Bell & Keane JJ in their joint judgement emphasised that "The common law in Australia must evolve within the limits of judicial power and not trespass into the province of legislative action", subsequently holding that the policy considerations were so complex that it should be left to parliament to determine. On the use of decisions from other common law jurisdictions, their Honours stated that caution should be used when applying decisions from other countries, holding "Judicial decisions about employment contracts in other common law jurisdictions, including the United Kingdom, attract the cautionary observation that Australian judges must 'subject [foreign rules] to inspection at the border to determine their adaptability to native soil'. That is not an injunction to legal protectionism. It is simply a statement about the sensible use of comparative law"

Similarly Gageler J held that "in its intersection with the law of unfair dismissal, the implied term would intrude a common law policy choice of broad and uncertain scope into an area of frequent, detailed and often contentious legislative activity".

==== Mutual trust and confidence ====
The Court unanimously held that an implied term of mutual trust and confidence was not necessary.

French CJ Bell & Keane JJ noted that the implied term was directed to the relationship between employer and employee rather than the performance of the contract. It depends upon a view of social conditions and desirable social policy that informs a transformative approach to the contract of employment in law. It should not be accepted as applicable, by the judicial branch of government, to employment contracts in Australia.". Their Honours also held that the implied term was not an application of the duty to cooperate, nor was it a restatement of the duty of fidelity.

Gageler J largely adopted the reasons of Jessup J in the Full Court of the Federal Court, including "the potential to act as a Trojan horse in the sense of revealing only after the event the specific prohibitions which it imports into the contract".

==== Relational Theory ====
The joint judgement referred to relational theory, however their Honours stated while the employment contract may be described as relational, it was "a characteristic of uncertain application in this context".

==== Good Faith ====
An implied term of good faith has been seen as co-existing with the implied term of mutual trust and confidence, to the point of them being identified as a single obligation. While the implied term of mutual trust and confidence was unanimously rejected, the majority identified them as separate obligations and left open the question of the implied term of good faith. The joint judgement stated that their "conclusion should not be taken as reflecting upon the question whether there is a general obligation to act in good faith in the performance of contracts and the related question whether contractual powers and discretions may be limited by good faith and rationality requirements". Kiefel J similarly left open the question of good faith, holding that "The question whether a standard of good faith should be applied generally to contracts has not been resolved in Australia. ... It is therefore neither necessary nor appropriate to discuss good faith further, particularly having regard to the wider importance of the topic."

== Significance ==
The immediate impact of the decision is that mutual trust and confidence as an implied contractual term is dead and buried in Australia. The analysis in Macken's Law of Employment was that "It leaves an employee without a remedy where there is no breach of the contract of employment even if an employer's conduct is outrageous".

Under the bargain theory that underpins Australian contract law, the parties are free to include an explicit term of mutual trust and confidence in contracts of employment. If they do not do so, it may reflect that it is not an important issue for employees, or it may reflect the accuracy of submission for Mr Barker that employment was a relationship characterised by economic dependence and a disparity of power, even in the case of an employee able to negotiate a salary in excess of the high income definition.

The High Court deliberately left open the question of good faith, an issue that has subsequently been considered by the courts

- State of New South Wales v Shaw the NSW Court of Appeal held that the statutory and industrial regime which regulated the former teachers' employment contracts meant it was not necessary, to give the contracts effective operation, that a general term of good faith be implied, nor as an adjunct to the exercise of other contractual rights. The Court of Appeal also rejected that there would have been any breach of a term of good faith.
- Gramotnev v Queensland University of Technology the Qld Court of Appeal similarly rejected a general term of good faith.
