= Reda v Flag Ltd =

- Court: Judicial Committee of the Privy Council
- Decided: 11 July 2002
- Citation: [2002] UKPC 38, [2002] IRLR 747

Case history
- Prior action: Court of Appeal of Bermuda

Keywords
- Dismissal, director, good faith

Reda v Flag Ltd [2002] UKPC 38 is a case from Bermuda law, advised upon by the Privy Council, that is relevant for UK labour law and UK company law concerning the dismissal of a director.

== Facts ==
Mr Reda and Mr Abdul Jalil were senior executives of Flag Ltd in Bermuda and had contractual rights to the employee benefit schemes and pay linked to the chief executive’s. Their contracts also said they could be terminated with or without cause. A new chief executive was appointed on a higher salary and they were asked to waive their right to their contracts to be linked. They declined and they were then terminated. Flag Ltd then established a management share option scheme. Flag Ltd wished to have a declaration about the sums due to the directors.

== Advice ==
=== Bermuda Courts ===
The judge held that the termination of their employment was to prevent them becoming eligible so they should be paid the linked salaries and because they were in fact entitled to reasonable notice they got the options.

The Court of Appeal of Bermuda held that the employment was validly terminated and they were not entitled to participate in the share option scheme.

=== Privy Council ===
Lord Millett advised the executives were not entitled to the stock options. Flag Ltd had been entitled to terminate the contracts without cause, and this was not affected by the motive behind the decision to dismiss. The power to terminate did not breach the implied term of trust and confidence, and no requirement for reasonable notice could be implied given the express term allowing for termination of the fixed term contracts. An express contractual provision to dismiss someone without cause could not be circumscribed by implied terms about notice or good faith.

43. … The Directors of Flag were, of course, obliged to exercise their powers as directors in good faith and for the benefit of the company. As the Court of Appeal pointed out, however, this was a duty owed to the company and not to its employees. There is no reason to doubt that, in resolving to exercise Flag’s contractual right to terminate the appellants’ contracts without cause and before a stock option plan had been established, the Directors were loyally seeking to further the interests of Flag as they saw them, and Flag’s shareholders implicitly approved the action that they took on its behalf. They could properly form the view, as they undoubtedly did, that it would not be appropriate to grant the appellants stock options or, to put the matter another way, that it would be commercially inappropriate to grant such options to employees whose contracts of employment had only a few more weeks to run.

[...]

45. Their Lordships accept that the appellants' contracts of employment contained an implied term that Flag would not without reasonable and proper cause destroy the relationship of trust and confidence which should exist between employer and employee. The existence of such a term is now well established on the authorities: see Imperial Group Pensions Trust Limited v Imperial Tobacco Ltd [1991] 1 WLR 589 at pp. 597-9; Malik v Bank of Credit and Commerce International SA [1998] AC 20; Johnson v Unisys [2001] 2 All ER 801. But in common with other implied terms, it must yield to the express provisions of the contract. As Lord Millett observed in Johnson v Unisys it cannot sensibly be used to extend the relationship beyond its agreed duration; and, their Lordships would add, it cannot sensibly be used to circumscribe an express power of dismissal without cause. This would run counter to the general principle that an express and unrestricted power cannot in the ordinary way be circumscribed by an implied qualification: see Nelson v British Broadcasting Corporation [1977] IRLR 148 (where it was sought to imply a restriction of location into a contract which contained an unqualified mobility clause). Roskill LJ said at p. 151:

“... it is a basic principle of contract law that if a contract makes express provision ... in almost unrestricted language, it is impossible in the same breath to imply into that contract a restriction of the kind that the Industrial Tribunal sought to do.”

47. [Lord Millett distinguished BG plc v O'Brien [2001] IRLR 496, saying:] The only reason for excluding the complainant from the opportunity of entering into the revised contract of employment was the fact that the employer did not realise that he was a permanent employee. If this had been appreciated, he would have been offered the same enhanced terms as his colleagues. The employer’s mistake was not a reasonable and proper cause for singling the complainant out for different and less favourable treatment.

[...]

50. ‘The remedy was to award him damages by reference to the amount of the enhanced redundancy terms to which he would have become entitled if he had been offered the revised contract like his fellow permanent employees. These were not damages for wrongful dismissal (since his dismissal was not wrongful) but damages for breach of an implied term in his contract that he would not during the period of his employment and without reasonable and proper cause be treated less favourably than his fellow employees.

Lord Millett also referred to Aspden v Webbs Poultry & Meat Group (Holding) Ltd [1996] IRLR 521, where Sedley J said the express term could be interpreted in light of the implied term, which was necessary to imply.

Lord Nicholls, Lord Mackay, Lord Hope and Lord Hutton concurred.

== See also ==
- UK labour law
