= Imperial Group Pension Trust Ltd v Imperial Tobacco Ltd =

- Court: High Court
- Citation: [1991] 1 WLR 589; [1991] IRLR 66; [1991] ICR 524; [1991] 2 All ER 597

Keywords
- Pension trusts

Imperial Group Pension Trust Ltd v Imperial Tobacco Ltd [1991] 1 WLR 589 is an English trust law case, especially relevant for UK labour law and UK company law, concerning pension funds and the implementation of a poison pill.

== Facts ==
The Imperial Tobacco pension trust committee asked the court whether the wording of rule 64A of the pension scheme could be varied with the company management’s consent. This said that members’ benefits ‘shall be increased by at least the lesser of’ 5% pa or the Retail Price Index. That provision was introduced following an amendment under rule 36 that said the committee could make an amendment following the company management’s consent. Imperial Tobacco had been taken over by Hanson Trust plc, and the rule 64A was introduced as an apparent poison pill, because the previous position was that employees’ pensions were only updated ad hoc and usually below inflation. This accompanied the automatic closure of the existing scheme to new entrants. But the takeover succeeded in 1986. By then, inflation had increased above 5%, and so the committee asked management if they would update pensions over 5%. The new management refused, and offered instead a new scheme of the lesser of 15% pa or RPI updates. Employees holding entitlements to the old scheme, if they transferred, would take their aliquot share, including surpluses (there was an estimated £130m at the time). However, the catch in the new scheme was that any surplus would go to the company, not the employees’ themselves. The trust alleged that, if the committee did have to obtain management’s consent to update the entitlements to keep pace with inflation, the offer given was a breach of a duty of good faith because it was compelling employees to forgo their acquired rights.

== Judgment ==
Sir Nicolas Browne-Wilkinson VC held that rule 64A could not be construed as allowing the committee to make increases without management’s consent. However, the company management could not use its discretion to withhold its consent in a way that undermined good faith, and mutual trust and confidence. The company management was not exercising a fiduciary power, and so it could take its own interests, including financial burdens, into account, but it still had to exercise its power for a proper purpose. A collateral purpose of coercing members to relinquish their accrued rights for the company to benefit from the surplus, was bad faith. His judgment on the nature of the pension obligations read as follows.

Pension scheme trusts are of quite a different nature to traditional trusts. The traditional trust is one under which the settlor, by way of bounty, transfers property to trustees to be administered for the beneficiaries as objects of his bounty. Normally, there is no legal relationship between the parties apart from the trust. The beneficiaries have given no consideration for what they receive. The settlor, as donor, can impose such limits on his bounty as he chooses, including imposing a requirement that the consent of himself or some other person shall be required to the exercise of the powers. As the Court of Appeal have pointed out in Mihlenstedt v Barclays Bank International Ltd [1989] IRLR 522 a pension scheme is quite different. Pension benefits are part of the consideration which an employee receives in return for the rendering of his services. In many cases, including the present, membership of the pension scheme is a requirement of employment. In contributory schemes, such as this, the employee is himself bound to pay for his or her contributions. Beneficiaries of the scheme, the members, far from being volunteers, have been given valuable consideration. The company employer is not conferring a bounty. In my judgment, the scheme is established against the background of such employment and falls to be interpreted against that background.

In every contract of employment, there is an implied term:

“that the employers will not, without reasonable and proper cause, conduct themselves in a manner calculated or likely to destroy or seriously damage the relationship of confidence and trust between employer and employee;” Woods v WM Car Services (Peterborough) Ltd [1981] ICR 666, 670, approved by the Court of Appeal in Lewis v Motorworld Garages Ltd [1986] ICR 157.

I will call this implied term “the implied obligation of good faith.” In my judgment, that obligation of an employer applies as much to the exercise of his rights and powers under a pension scheme as they do to the other rights and powers of an employer. Say, in purported exercise of its right to give or withhold consent, the company were to say, capriciously, that it would consent to an increase in the pension benefits of members of union A but not of the members of union B. In my judgment, the members of union B would have a good claim in contract for breach of the implied obligation of good faith: see Mihlenstedt v Barclays Bank International Ltd [1989] IRLR 522, 525, 531, paras 12, 64 and 70.

In my judgment, it is not necessary to found such a claim in contract alone. Construed against the background of the contract of employment, in my judgment the pension trust deed and rules themselves are to be taken as being impliedly subject to the limitation that the rights and powers of the company can only be exercised in accordance with the implied obligation of good faith.

== See also ==
- UK company law
- English trust law
- The Achilleas
- Wallace v. United Grain Growers Ltd. [1997] 3 SCR 701
