= Mutual trust and confidence =

Phrase in English law

Mutual trust and confidence is a phrase used in English law, particularly with reference to contracts in UK labour law, to refer to the obligations owed in an employment relationship between the employer and the worker.

This concept relates to a new but highly important concept in employment law, and constitutes a term that is implied into all employment contracts. The implied term means that both the employer and employee should behave in such a way as to not undermine the employment relationship.

Academics now talk of the duty of good faith in the employment relationship. (i.e. both parties should "look out" for each other)

It is such an important issue that this implied term can override (in certain circumstances) an express term of the employment contract. e.g. excessive hours for junior doctors (See the Court of Appeal decision in Johnstone v. Bloomsbury Health Authority)

== Cases ==
- Mahmud and Malik v Bank of Credit and Commerce International SA [1998] AC 20
- Wilson v Racher [1974] ICR 428
- The Post Office v Roberts [1980] IRLR 347
- Transco plc v O'Brien [2002] EWCA Civ 379
- Eastwood v Magnox Electric plc [2004] UKHL 35
- Mallone v BPB Industries plc [2002] EWCA Civ 126
- Luke v Stoke-on-Trent City Council [2007] EWCA Civ 761

== Australia ==
In 2014 the High Court of Australia unanimously and firmly rejected the proposition that contracts of employment in Australia should contain an implied term of mutual trust and confidence. The court left open the question whether there is a general obligation to act in good faith in the performance of contracts and the related question whether contractual powers and discretions may be limited by good faith and rationality requirements.

== See also ==
- UK labour law
- English contract law
- Good faith
