= Devonald v Rosser & Sons =

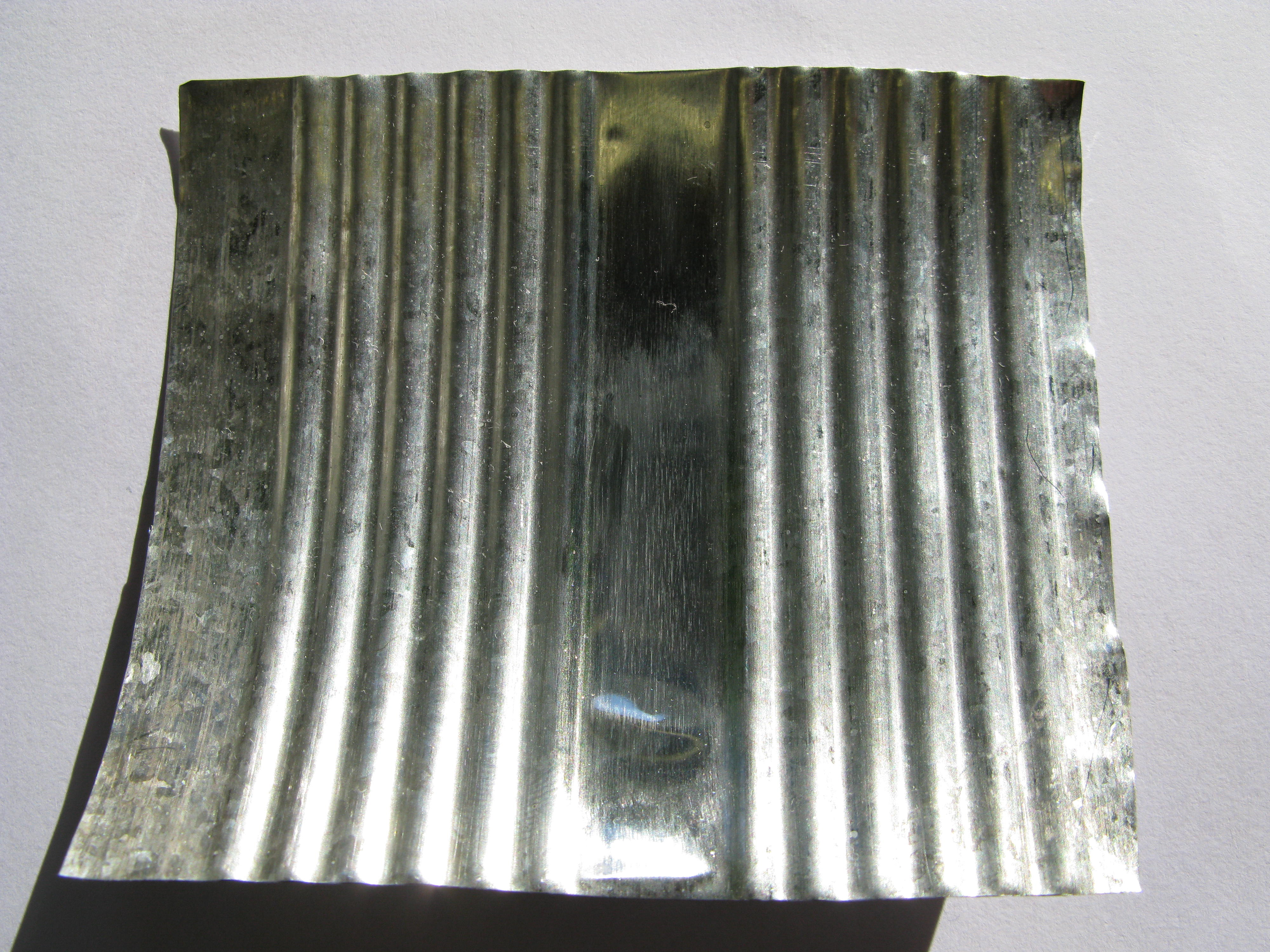
- Coat of Arms of the United Kingdom (1837-1952).svg
- Court: Court of Appeal
- Citation: [1906] 2 KB 728

Case opinions
- Lord Alverston CJ

Keywords
- Employment contract

Devonald v Rosser & Sons [1906] 2 KB 728 is a UK labour law case concerning the contract of employment. It held that an implied term of employment contracts is that when there is no work available to be done, the employer must bear the risk by continuing to pay wages.

== Facts ==
In a test case, Mr Devonald was a tinplate rollerman at Rosser & Sons’ factory in Cilfrew, South Wales. He was paid for each completed box of 112 tin plates. His contract said he was required to do the tasks set by the employer and that he would get 28 days' notice before termination. Unfortunately, tinplates were in decline and the employer announced the plant would close in two weeks. There was a six-week period, therefore, when the employer gave no work. The question was whether the employer had to pay, given that payment was really according to piece.

== Judgment ==
Lord Alverston CJ held that the employee did not bear the risk of plant closure.

On the one hand we must consider the matter from the point of view of the employers who I agree will under ordinary circumstance desire to carry their works at a profit… On the other hand, we have to consider the position of the workman. The workman has to live; and the effect of the defendants' contention is that if the master at any time found that his works were being carried on at a loss, he might at once close down his works and cease to employ his men, who, even if they gave notice to quit the employment, would be bound to the master for a period of at least twenty-eight days during which time they would be unable to earn any wages at all. I agree with Jelf J that that is an unreasonable contention from the workman’s point of view. In my opinion the necessary implication to be drawn from this contract is at least that the master will find a reasonable amount of work up to the expiration of a notice given in accordance with the contract. …it seems that there is nothing unreasonable in the implication that the master shall look at least twenty-eight days ahead, or, to take the extreme case, as the notice has to be given on the first Monday in the month, fifty-seven days ahead, so as to place himself in a position to provide the workman with work during the period covered by the notice.

== See also ==
- UK labour law
- Employment contract in English law
- Autoclenz Ltd v Belcher [2011] UKSC 41
