= Baldwin v Brighton and Hove City Council =

UK labour law case

- Court: Employment Appeal Tribunal
- Citation: [2007] IRLR 232, [2007] ICR 680

Case opinions
- Judge Peter Clark

Keywords
- Sex discrimination, mutual trust and confidence

Baldwin v Brighton and Hove City Council [2007] IRLR 232 is a UK labour law case, concerning gender discrimination and the implied term of mutual trust and confidence.

== Facts ==
Andy Baldwin underwent gender reassignment while working in a temporary post as a Lesbian Gay and Bisexual Community Safety Development Officer with Brighton and Hove City Council. He changed his name after December 2002 to Andy. Also in December, the temporary post ended because funding ran out, but the appointment was extended to January 2003 to let him apply for a new post. On 24 January he resigned, and claimed for sex discrimination under s 2A SDA 1975 because he alleged that a Reverend David Miller, who had been appointed as a member of the panel interviewing for alternative posts, was transphobic. Mr Andy Baldwin also claimed for constructive unfair dismissal because in permitting a discriminatory work environment with an unfair selection procedure the employer breached the implied term of mutual trust and confidence.

== Judgment ==
=== Employment Tribunal ===
The Employment tribunal held the interview panel member did not know Mr Baldwin was transsexual, and just being a panel member did not mean that he had ‘treated’ the Mr Baldwin in any way. Mr Baldwin resigned because the alternative post was inferior.

=== Employment Appeal Tribunal ===
Judge Peter Clark held the tribunal was right, because without knowledge of the transsexuality, the panel member was not treating Mr Baldwin in any way special, and it was not enough under s 2A SDA 1975 that he ‘would’ have been treated less favourably. He could not rely on his own perception that the panel might be biased against him. Similarly there was no breach of mutual trust and confidence because the employers had no knowledge of the gender reassignment at the relevant time. So appointing some allegedly transphobic could not be conduct ‘calculated and likely’ to destroy mutual trust and confidence (the use of the word ‘and’ though, should have been ‘or’ in Mahmoud and Malik v BCCI SA). Judge Peter Clarke explained his reasoning for the case's failure as follows.

42 For the purposes of establishing breach of the implied term, Mr Harding focuses, in this appeal, on the Miller incident. Mr Swift submits that this aspect of the matter was not relied upon below as part of the claimant's case on constructive dismissal. It is not pleaded in the further and better particulars of claim and no application to amend was made below. Mr Harding points to para 150 of the further and better particulars, where it is contended that the claimant was forced out of his employment by, among other things, the appointment of Mr Miller (a transphobe) to the selection panel for the new post. However, that contention relies upon the employers having knowledge of the claimant being a transsexual. Otherwise their conduct, through Ms Beanlands, in appointing Mr Miller cannot be said to be conduct which objectively considered is likely to undermine trust and confidence. The tribunal found the employers did not have the necessary knowledge. What Mr Harding seeks to do, in our view impermissibly (see Meikle ), is to rely on the claimant's subjective view that such appointment undermined trust and confidence. That is the effect of para 42 of his written closing submissions below. 43 However, even if the breach contended for is made out, the claimant has a further difficulty. The tribunal (para 28.17) were not satisfied that the reason for the claimant's resignation was because of the employers' treatment of him. Further, at para 30.9.2, they found that even if Mr Miller had not been on the interview panel the claimant would not have applied for the new post because he saw it as a demotion. According to his resignation letter he would not, as he put it, collaborate in the reduction, downsizing, downgrading and devaluing of the crucial work on which he had been engaged.

== See also ==
- Wilson v Racher
