= Cresswell v Board of Inland Revenue =

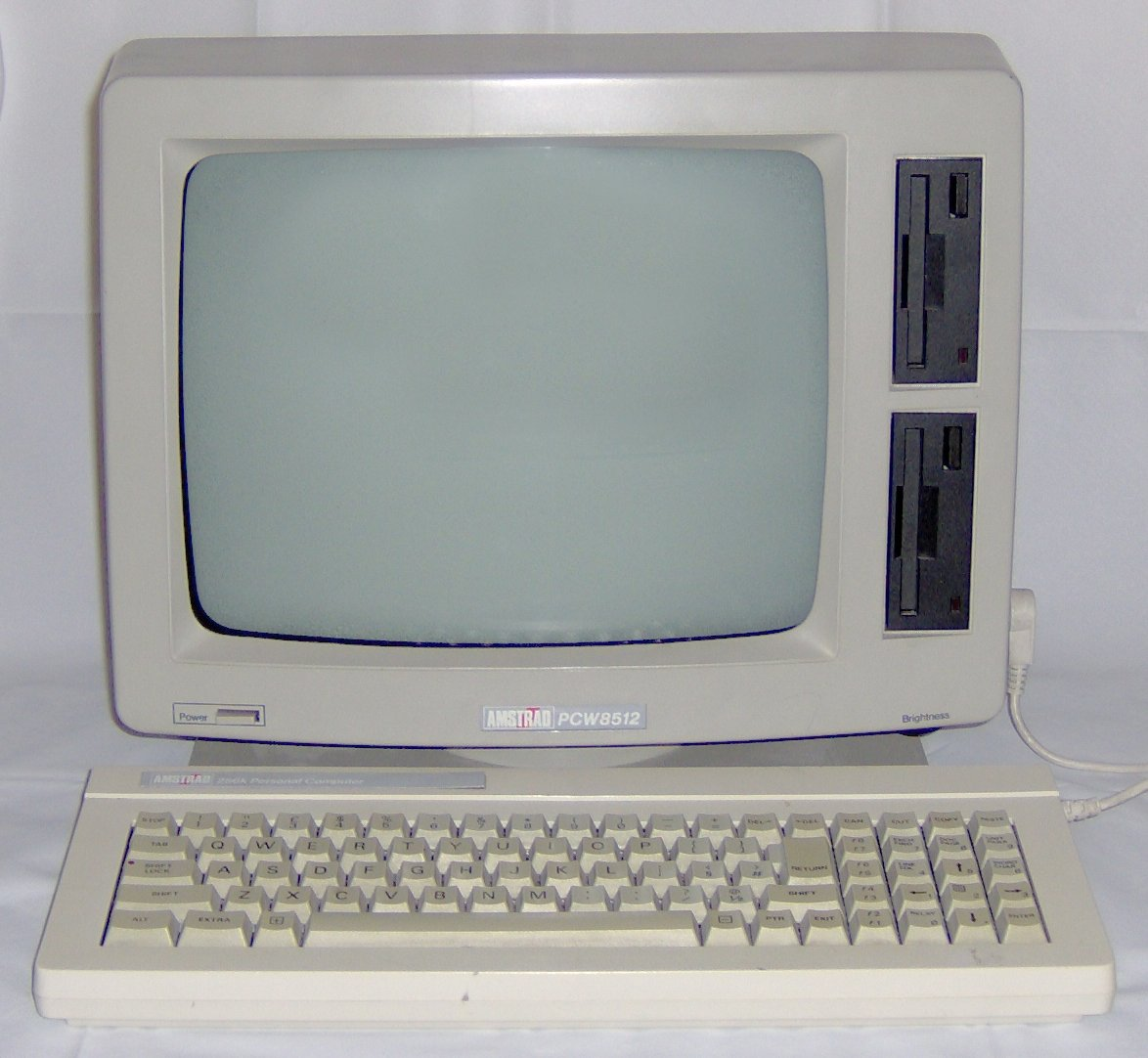
- Does computerization breach terms of employment?
- Court: High Court
- Citation: [1984] ICR 508

Keywords
- Employment contract

Cresswell v Board of Inland Revenue [1984] ICR 508 is a UK labour law case concerning the contract of employment.

== Facts ==
Mr Cresswell worked as a tax officer. He and others were required by the Inland Revenue to start using computerised record systems (COP 1) to calculate people's taxes and sending out letters. Some of them, including Cresswell, preferred the old method of paper files. The contracts specified the work merely in general terms. Cresswell wanted a declaration that the change was a breach of contract.

== Judgment ==
Walton J dismissed the claim, holding that the new changes could legitimately be introduced. He noted that the changes here were not that ‘esoteric’, and the workers had been given proper training.

Of course, in a proper case the employer must provide any necessary training...

One of the main functions of a computer is to store records and so it is well within the scope of the clerical assistant's job to help in keeping the necessary records by entering the information upon a computer. This does not, pace some of the wilder suggestions that have been made in this case, make him a computer operator any more than a customer who draws cash from a service till facility afforded by his bank is a computer operator because he is required to feed certain information into the service till as a pre-requisite to drawing the cash he requires. Of course, the transaction here is one way, but it is no more outside the scope of the duties of a clerical assistant than filing the details desired to be recorded upon a card; the essential step is the same in both cases. And when one comes to consider the tax officer and tax officer higher grade, the matter is, if anything, even clearer. Here, although I think also the words “computer operator,” or, more picturesquely, “slave to the machine” were bandied about during the course of the trial, it is extremely difficult to think that, if an entirely unprejudiced observer were to sit in the offices of any of the 14 districts for any length of time, observing intelligently all that went on, and was then asked, what job have these people got, he would not in all conscience be able to say that they were anything other than tax officers; that is to say, officers working the P.A.Y.E. tax system in all its manifold aspects.

Of course the changes in working methods and practices which COP brings in its train are great — although I think that the evidence has tended to exaggerate them. But that, as it seems to me, is not the point. COP merely introduces up to date modern methods for dealing with bulk problems: it leaves the jobs done by those who operate the new methodology precisely the same as before, although the content of some of the jobs, most notably that of the grade of clerical assistant, will have been considerably altered, but in no case altered anything like sufficiently to fall outside the original description of the proper functions of the grade concerned. Moreover, the contrary conclusion would fly in the face of common sense. Although doubtless, all of us, being conservative (with a small “c”) by nature desire nothing better than to be left to deepen our accustomed ruts, and hate change, a tax officer has no right to remain in perpetuity doing one defined type of tax work in one particular way.

== See also ==
- UK labour law
- Employment contract in English law
- Autoclenz Ltd v Belcher [2011] UKSC 41
