= Transco plc v O'Brien =

Transco plc v O’Brien
- Court: Court of Appeal of England and Wales
- Decided: 7 March 2002
- Citation: [2002] EWCA Civ 379

Court membership
- Judges sitting: Pill LJ, Longmore LJ and Sir Martin Nourse

Case opinions
- Pill LJ

Keywords
- Employment contract

Transco plc v O'Brien [2002] EWCA Civ 379 is a UK labour law case concerning the contract of employment.

== Facts ==
Mr O’Brien worked through an employment agency. He moved to an hourly wage. Transco announced it would give better terms to a 70 strong workforce, except Mr O’Brien, who it did not regard as permanent.

== Judgment ==
Pill LJ gave the judgment for the Court of Appeal held that Mr O'Brien was an employee and that there had been a breach of contract.

11. The appellants accept that a term can be implied into a contract of employment that the employer will not "without reasonable and proper cause, conduct itself in a manner likely to destroy or seriously damage the relationship of confidence and trust between employer and employee": Lord Nicholls of Birkenhead in Malik v Bank of Credit and Commerce International SA [1998] AC 20 at page 34...

17. In this case, for good commercial reasons the appellants decided to offer their workforce (the relevant part of which was over 70 strong) a new contract on better terms. To single out an employee on capricious grounds and refuse to offer him the same terms as are offered to the rest of the workforce is in my judgment a breach of the implied term of trust and confidence. There are few things which would be more likely to damage seriously (to put it no higher) the relationship of trust between an employer and employee than a capricious refusal, in present circumstances, to offer the same terms to a single employee.

18. The matter should be looked at as one of substance. Whether the form of the change proposed by the employer is by way of variation or by way of a new contract is not in itself of great importance: the context and the substance of the matter must be considered. The substance here was an offer of fresh contractual arrangements to a workforce in order to achieve the employer's aims and objects, though the welfare of the workforce may well also have been a factor. To deprive one member of a large workforce of the same opportunity as offered to all his fellow workers is a clear breach of the implied term, in my view.

Longmore LJ and Sir Martin Nourse agreed.

== See also ==
- UK labour law
- Employment contract in English law
- Autoclenz Ltd v Belcher [2011] UKSC 41
