= Rigby v Ferodo Ltd =

1988 UK labour law case

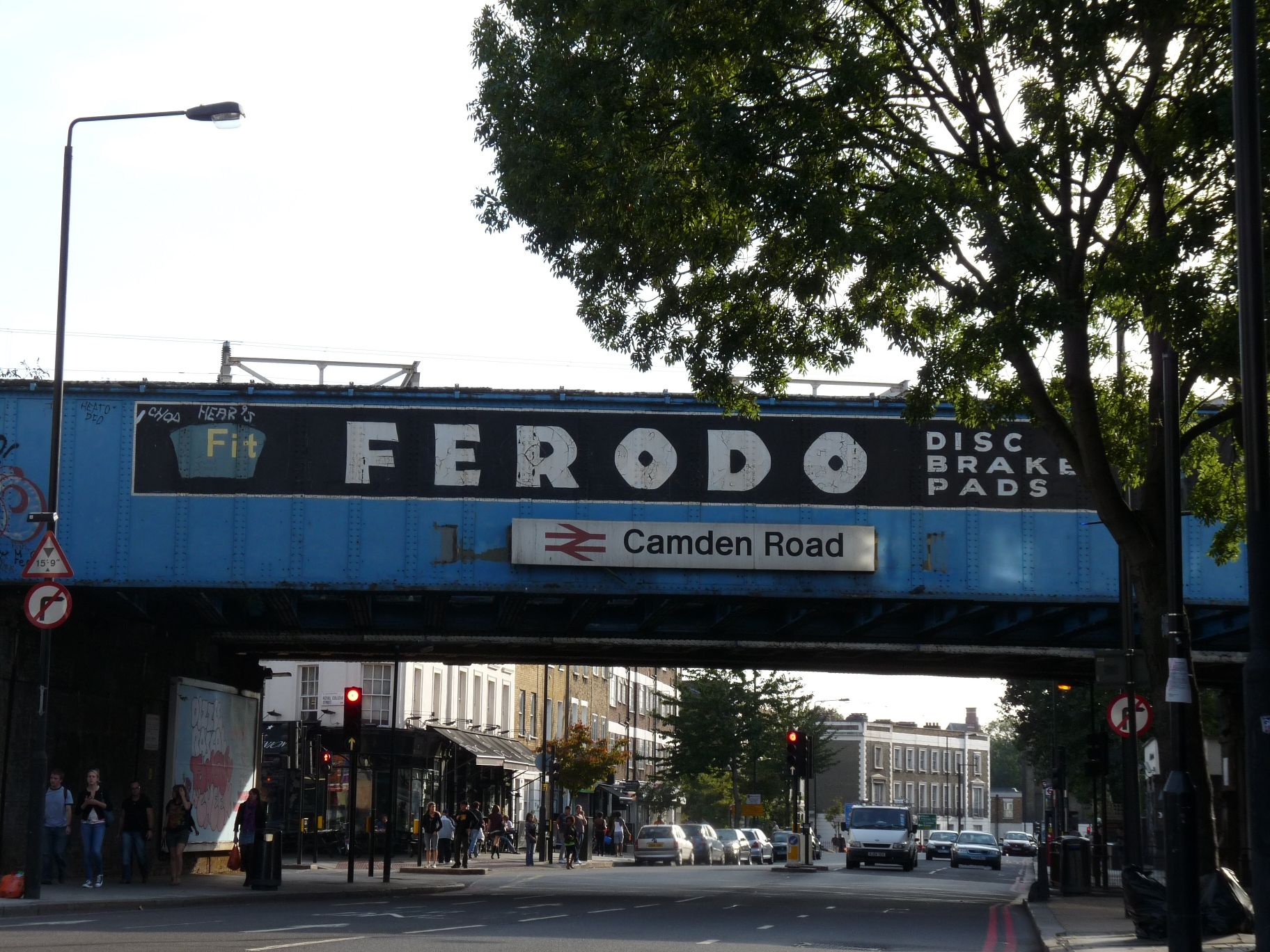
- Court: House of Lords
- Citation: [1988] ICR 29

Court membership
- Judges sitting: Lord Bridge, Lord Fraser, Lord Brightman, Lord Ackner and Lord Oliver.

Keywords
- Employment contract

Rigby v Ferodo Ltd [1988] ICR 29 is a UK labour law case concerning the contract of employment. It held that if an employer reduces wages without a worker's consent, the worker may continue to work and claim the shortfall.

== Facts ==
Ferodo Ltd cut wages by 5% to stay afloat. The trade union agreed not to strike. Mr Rigby, who worked as a lathe operator on £129 a week with a contract terminable on 12 weeks’ notice, made it known he did not accept the wage reduction. For him this was approximately £30 a week. He continued to work and after over a year, he claimed for shortfall.

The judge held there was a unilateral variation of the contract, which amounted to a breach, and so Mr Rigby was entitled to damages. The Court of Appeal agreed. Ferodo Ltd appealed to the House of Lords.

== Judgment ==
The House of Lords held that there had been a repudiatory breach of contract by the employer and so Mr Rigby was entitled to claim his shortfall in wages. If the employee continued to work, this did not necessarily imply he accepted the change, nor was it the case that the contract was automatically brought to an end. Moreover, because Ferodo Ltd had not in fact terminated the contract the damages that Mr Rigby received could be beyond the 12-week notice period in which the contract could legitimately have been terminated, and a notice of unilateral variation could not be implicitly construed as giving notice of termination.

== See also ==
- UK labour law
- Employment contract in English law
- Autoclenz Ltd v Belcher [2011] UKSC 41
