= Hall v Lorimer =

- Court: Court of Appeal
- Citations: [1993] EWCA Civ 25, [1994] IRLR 171

Case opinions
- Nolan LJ

Keywords
- Contract of employment

Hall v Lorimer [1993] EWCA Civ 25 is a UK labour law case concerning the status of a worker as employed or self-employed. The Court of Appeal took the view that an employment contract requires regard to be had to the extent to which the worker is in business on their own account. Because Mr Lorimer took a business-like attitude to finding new clients he was held to be running a self-employed business and not working in a succession of short-term employments.

== Facts ==
Mr Lorimer received £32,875 for his employment and incurred expenses of £9,250. He was a television technician working for 20 separate companies on short term jobs.

== Judgment ==
Nolan LJ held that Lorimer was self-employed and could therefore set his expenses off against his income. He said what is partly relevant to employment status is,

the extent to which the individual is dependant or independent of a particular paymaster for the financial exploitation of his talents.

He takes financial risks, provides his own tools/equipment, and takes the profits, and pays his own taxes and National Insurance contributions.

Following this judgment, the "proper approach" to determining whether an individual is employed or self-employed has been seen as an exercise looking at "the facts overall" and arriving at "a complete picture" of all the circumstances, "giving appropriate significance to each element".

== See also ==
- Contract of employment in English law
- UK labour law
- EU labour law
- US labor law
- German labour law
