= Henry v London General Transport Services =

Henry v London General Transport Services Ltd
- Court: Court of Appeal of England and Wales
- Decided: 22 March 2001
- Citations: [2002] EWCA Civ 488, [2002] ICR 910, [2002] IRLR 472, [2002] Emp LR 1031

Keywords
- Contract of employment

Henry v London General Transport Services Ltd [2002] EWCA 488 is a UK labour law case concerning the scope of protection for people to employment rights.

== Facts ==
The Transport and General Workers Union negotiated with a management buy-out (via share transfer) prospector for a collective agreement that would mean less pay and worse conditions for members. Sixty three members, including Mr Carlton Henry, objected. The other 1,500 agreed to it. The sixty three claimed for unlawful wage deductions under Employment Rights Act 1996, section 13. Had their contracts been varied by collective agreement, in absence of an express incorporation clause in their contracts? There had been no ballot, which was workplace custom, so the 63 argued that there was no incorporation.

The Employment Tribunal upheld the claim of the sixty three, and by continuing to work for 2 years under protest, they had never consented. However the Employment Appeal Tribunal allowed the employer’s appeal, but remitted to trial whether a ballot was in fact reasonable, certain and notorious.

== Judgment ==
Pill LJ rejected the employees’ appeal. It said, first, that the tribunal had not justified its conclusion that the employees had not consented by working normally for two years. Second, it needed to be asked whether it was customary – as well as a collective agreement with a ballot binding the workforce – if a collective agreement without a ballot could bind the workforce.

Longmore LJ and Sir Martin Nourse agreed.

== See also ==
- Contract of employment in English law
- UK labour law
- EU labour law
- US labor law
- German labour law
