= Alexander v Standard Telephones & Cables Ltd (No 2) =

Alexander and Wall v Standard Telephones & Cables Ltd (No 2)
- Court: High Court
- Citation: [1991] IRLR 287

Case opinions
- Hobhouse J

Keywords
- Contract of employment

Alexander and Wall v Standard Telephones & Cables Ltd (No 2) [1991] IRLR 287 is a UK labour law case on when a collective agreement is incorporated into an employment contract.

== Facts ==
The workplace collective agreement of Standard Telephones & Cables Ltd in paragraph 6.1 worked on a "last in, first out" criteria for redundancy, ‘selection within each skill group will be made on the basis of service within the group’. Paragraph 6.2 said the ‘mutual objective will be to ensure that a balance of skills within the department is preserved…’ Standard Telephones instead made people redundant on the basis of skills needed. Mr Alexander and Ward both had informal contracts of employment. They were older and claiming they should not have been made compulsorily redundant. Because there was no evidence of express incorporation, the court asked whether it could be incorporated through implication.

== Judgment ==
Hobhouse J held that the collective agreement would not be incorporated. He said that whether the collective agreement was incorporated was a matter of construction. Here the agreement designated itself as a ‘procedure’ agreement. ‘It is undoubtedly primarily a policy document applicable to the relationship between the unions and the company. It is also specifically concerned with procedure.’ Another clause referring to redeployment depended on another company division accepting the worker. This was not,

apt to be a term of an existing contract of employment as it involves the choice of the company to make an offer and it is only from the making of that offer and its acceptance that any individual right can subsequently arise....

In this context, where none of the other clauses of the collective agreement are apt to be incorporated into the individual contract of employment, it would require some cogent indication in clause 6 that it was to have a different character…

[Paragraph 6.2 was expressed] ... in policy terms having regard to inter-union relationships’.

[Paragraph 6.1] ... is expressed in terms which are capable of giving rise to individual rights… However, I consider that the wording of paragraph 6.1 is too weak, when considered in the context in which it occurs… Clear and specific express words of incorporation contained in a primary contractual document could displace this conclusion…

== See also ==
- Contract of employment in English law
- UK labour law
- EU labour law
- US labor law
- German labour law
