= Malone v British Airways plc =

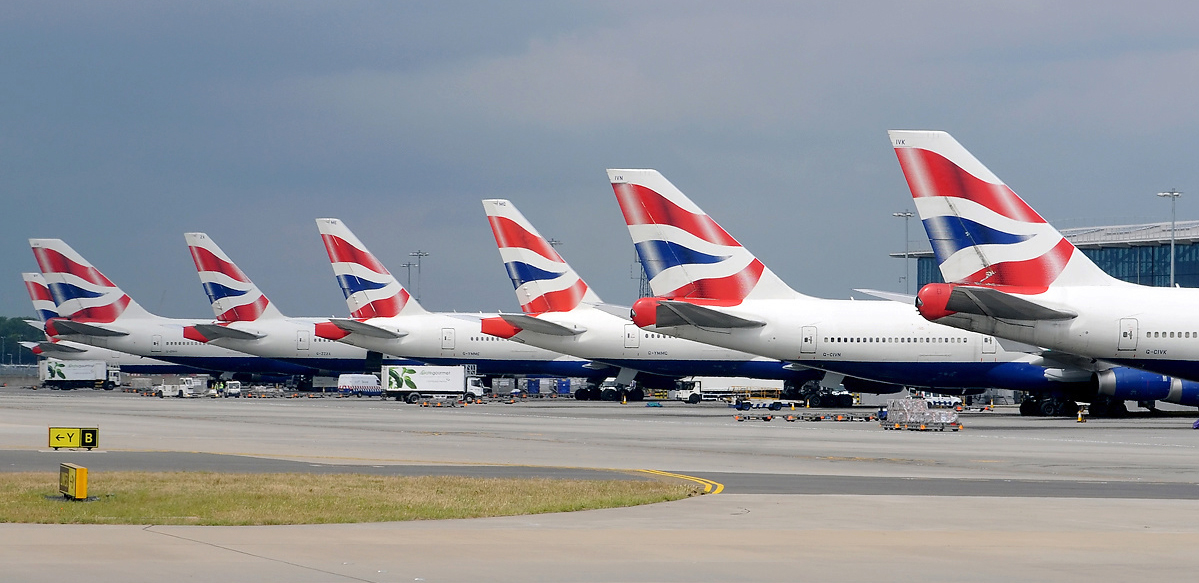
- Court: Court of Appeal
- Decided: 3 November 2010
- Citation: [2010] EWCA Civ 1225
- Transcript: BAILII

Court membership
- Judges sitting: Ward LJ, Smith LJ and Jackson LJ

Keywords
- Contract of employment, terms

Malone v British Airways plc [2010] EWCA 1225 is a UK labour law case, concerning the construction of terms in a contract of employment.

== Facts ==
British Airways reduced the number of cabin crew on their planes, above those required by law but below the level stipulated in a collective agreement, subject to a ‘disruption agreement’ requiring crew fly with one less member during disruptions and getting compensation. Section 7.1, entitled, "Minimum Planned Crew Complements" said,

All services will be planned to the current industrially agreed complements for each aircraft type. Future crew complements will continue to take into account in-flight product and cabin crew rest requirements.

Miss Malone’s contract said the collective agreement was incorporated. Malone argued the section was apt for incorporation because it affected the crew’s working conditions.

The Judge, Sir Christopher Holland held that those provisions were not apt for incorporation, and that even if he had found they were, he would not have awarded an injunction to enforce it because the balance of inconvenience weighed heavily against. The crew appealed.

== Judgment ==
Smith LJ, for the Court of Appeal held that the provisions were not aspirational, they were definite undertakings, but not an undertaking to individual employees. If it was individually enforceable, it would be ridiculous because then an individual could bring a flight to a halt by refusing to work under the contract terms. It was only binding in honour.

60. As I have said, I have found this issue difficult. It is not clear from the language whether section 7.1 is intended to be enforceable by an individual employee. In that it is unlike several other subsections which clearly impose duties on an individual employee or obligations on the employer towards individual employees. In my view, examining the context of the agreement as a whole does not help with the construction of section 7.1.

61. I am satisfied that crew complements do impact to some extent upon the working conditions of individual employees and that that is a pointer towards section 7.1 being intended as an individually enforceable term. I also accept that the fact that crew complements have, in the past, been negotiated as part of a productivity deal is another pointer towards enforceability. I accept also that an undertaking as to the size of the team of workers who will undertake a task may, in some circumstances, be enforceable by individuals.

62. Set against that are the disastrous consequences for BA which could ensue if this term were to be individually enforceable. It seems to me that they are so serious as to be unthinkable. By that I mean that if the parties had thought about the issue at the time of negotiation, they would have immediately have said it was not intended that section 7.1 could have the effect of enabling an individual or a small group of cabin crew members to bring a flight to a halt by refusing to work under complement. So, if I apply the rule by which a term of uncertain meaning is to be construed, that of asking what, objectively considered in the light of the factual matrix against which the agreement was made, the parties must be taken to have intended the provision to mean, I am driven to the conclusion that they did not mean this term to be individually enforceable. I accept that there are pointers towards individual enforceability but these are not conclusive. In the end, I think that the true construction of this term is that it was intended as an undertaking by the employer towards its cabin crew employees collectively and was intended partly to protect jobs and partly to protect the crews, collectively, against excessive demands in terms of work and effort. I think that it was intended to be binding only in honour, although it created a danger that, if breached, industrial action would follow.

Ward LJ and Jackson LJ concurred.
