= Johnson v Unisys Ltd =

UK labour law case

- Court: House of Lords
- Decided: March 22, 2001
- Citations: [2001] UKHL 13, [2001] IRLR 279

Keywords
- Unfair dismissal, injury to feelings, compensation, contract of employment

Johnson v Unisys Limited [2001] UKHL 13 is a leading UK labour law case on the measure of damages for unfair dismissal and the nature of the contract of employment.

== Facts ==
After twenty years of working for Unisys Ltd in Milton Keynes, in 1994 Mr Johnson was dismissed for an alleged irregularity in his work. He suffered a mental breakdown, drank heavily, was admitted to mental hospital, could not find a new job despite over 100 applications and at age 52 was unlikely to have a promising future career. He claimed that he was wrongly dismissed, and that the manner of his dismissal, which was summarily without the chance of a fair hearing and with one month's pay in lieu only, caused his health problems. He sought compensation for unfair dismissal, and in addition for the manner of dismissal given the employer's breach of mutual trust and confidence. The House of Lords ruled that employees cannot claim common law damages for the manner of their dismissal, as such claims are confined to statutory remedies for unfair dismissal.

== Judgment ==
The House of Lords held that while Mr Johnson had been dismissed unfairly there could be no compensation for the manner of Mr Johnson's dismissal if that would exceed the statutory scheme laid out in the Employment Rights Act 1996 and the accompanying limits on compensation that could be sought through the system of employment tribunals. While a common law right to full compensation for breach of contract might exist, it could not circumvent the intention of Parliament in laying down limits to compensation for dismissals.

Lord Nicholls said the following.

2. [...] In principle the appellant's argument has much to commend it. I said so, in my obiter observations in Mahmud's case, at pages 39-40. But there is an insuperable obstacle: the intervention of Parliament in the unfair dismissal legislation. Having heard full argument on the point, I am persuaded that a common law right embracing the manner in which an employee is dismissed cannot satisfactorily coexist with the statutory right not to be unfairly dismissed. A newly developed common law right of this nature, covering the same ground as the statutory right, would fly in the face of the limits Parliament has already prescribed on matters such as the classes of employees who have the benefit of the statutory right, the amount of compensation payable and the short time limits for making claims. It would also defeat the intention of Parliament that claims of this nature should be decided by specialist tribunals, not the ordinary courts of law.

Lord Steyn, dissenting, argued the statutory remedies in salary for wrongful dismissal inadequate, and the statutory term of notice did not prevent developing an implied term of good faith and fair dealing. There was no conflict between the requirement of notice and not to exercise the power in a harsh, humiliating manner.

Lord Hoffmann made some important remarks on the contract of employment.

35. My Lords, the first question is whether the implied term of trust and confidence upon which Mr Johnson relies, and about which in a general way there is no real dispute, or any of the other implied terms, applies to a dismissal. At common law, the contract of employment was regarded by the courts as a contract like any other. The parties were free to negotiate whatever terms they liked and no terms would be implied unless they satisfied the strict test of necessity applied to a commercial contract. Freedom of contract meant that the stronger party, usually the employer, was free to impose his terms upon the weaker. But over the last 30 years or so, the nature of the contract of employment has been transformed. It has been recognised that a person's employment is usually one of the most important things in his or her life. It gives not only a livelihood but an occupation, an identity and a sense of self-esteem. The law has changed to recognise this social reality. Most of the changes have been made by Parliament. The Employment Rights Act 1996 consolidates numerous statutes which have conferred rights upon employees. European law has made a substantial contribution. And the common law has adapted itself to the new attitudes, proceeding sometimes by analogy with statutory rights.

36. The contribution of the common law to the employment revolution has been by the evolution of implied terms in the contract of employment. The most far-reaching is the implied term of trust and confidence. But there have been others. For example, in W A Goold (Pearmak) Ltd v McConnell [1995] IRLR 516, Morison J (sitting in the Employment Appeal Tribunal) said that it was an implied term of the contract of employment that an employer would reasonably and promptly afford employees an opportunity to obtain redress of grievances. He inferred such a term from what is now section 3 of the Employment Rights Act 1996, which requires that an employee be provided with a written statement of the particulars of his employment, including a note of how he may apply if he has any grievances. So statute and common law have proceeded hand in hand.

37. The problem lies in extending or adapting any of these implied terms to dismissal. There are two reasons why dismissal presents special problems. The first is that any terms which the courts imply into a contract must be consistent with the express terms. Implied terms may supplement the express terms of the contract but cannot contradict them. Only Parliament may actually override what the parties have agreed. The second reason is that judges, in developing the law, must have regard to the policies expressed by Parliament in legislation. Employment law requires a balancing of the interests of employers and employees, with proper regard not only to the individual dignity and worth of the employees but also to the general economic interest. Subject to observance of fundamental human rights, the point at which this balance should be struck is a matter for democratic decision. The development of the common law by the judges plays a subsidiary role. Their traditional function is to adapt and modernise the common law. But such developments must be consistent with legislative policy as expressed in statutes. The courts may proceed in harmony with Parliament but there should be no discord.

[...]

42. My Lords, in the face of this express provision that Unisys was entitled to terminate Mr Johnson's employment on four weeks notice without any reason, I think it is very difficult to imply a term that the company should not do so except for some good cause and after giving him a reasonable opportunity to demonstrate that no such cause existed.

43. On the other hand, I do not say that there is nothing which, consistently with such an express term, judicial creativity could do to provide a remedy in a case like this. In Wallace v United Grain Growers Ltd (1997) 152 DLR (4th) 1, 44-48, McLachlin J (in a minority judgment) said that the courts could imply an obligation to exercise the power of dismissal in good faith. That did not mean that the employer could not dismiss without cause. The contract entitled him to do so. But in so doing, he should be honest with the employee and refrain from untruthful, unfair or insensitive conduct. He should recognise that an employee losing his or her job was exceptionally vulnerable and behave accordingly. For breach of this implied obligation, McLachlin J would have awarded the employee, who had been dismissed in brutal circumstances, damages for mental distress and loss of reputation and prestige.

44. My Lords, such an approach would in this country have to circumvent or overcome the obstacle of Addis v Gramophone Co Ltd [1909] AC 488, in which it was decided that an employee cannot recover damages for injured feelings, mental distress or damage to his reputation, arising out of the manner of his dismissal. Speaking for myself, I think that, if this task was one which I felt called upon to perform, I would be able to do so. In Mahmud v Bank of Credit and Commerce International SA [1998] AC 20, 51 Lord Steyn said that the true ratio of Addis's case was the damages were recoverable only for loss caused by a breach of contract, not for loss caused by the manner of its breach. As McLachlin J said in the passage I have quoted, the only loss caused by a wrongful dismissal flows from a failure to give proper notice or make payment in lieu. Therefore, if wrongful dismissal is the only cause of action, nothing can be recovered for mental distress or damage to reputation. On the other hand, if such damage is loss flowing from a breach of another implied term of the contract, Addis's case does not stand in the way. That is why in Mahmud's case itself, damages were recoverable for financial loss flowing from damage to reputation caused by a breach of the implied term of trust and confidence.

[...]

50. It follows, my Lords, that if there was no relevant legislation in this area, I would regard the question of whether judges should develop the law by implying a suitable term into the contract of employment as finely balanced. But now I must consider the statutory background against which your Lordships are invited to create such a cause of action.

[...]

56. Part X of the Employment Rights Act 1996 therefore gives a remedy for exactly the conduct of which Mr Johnson complains. But Parliament had restricted that remedy to a maximum of £11,000, whereas Mr Johnson wants to claim a good deal more. The question is whether the courts should develop the common law to give a parallel remedy which is not subject to any such limit.

57. My Lords, I do not think that it is a proper exercise of the judicial function of the House to take such a step. Judge Ansell, to whose unreserved judgment I would pay respectful tribute, went in my opinion to the heart of the matter when he said:

"there is not one hint in the authorities that the...tens of thousands of people that appear before the tribunals can have, as it were, a possible second bite in common law and I ask myself, if this is the situation, why on earth do we have this special statutory framework? What is the point of it if it can be circumvented in this way? .... it would mean that effectively the statutory limit on compensation for unfair dismissal would disappear."

58. I can see no answer to these questions. For the judiciary to construct a general common law remedy for unfair circumstances attending dismissal would be to go contrary to the evident intention of Parliament that there should be such a remedy but that it should be limited in application and extent.

== See also ==
- UK labour law
