= Edmonds v Lawson =

- Court: Court of Appeal
- Decided: 10 March 2000
- Citations: [2000] EWCA Civ 69, [2000] QB 501, [2000] ICR 567, [2000] IRLR 391

Keywords
- Minimum wage, worker

Edmonds v Lawson [2000] EWCA Civ 69 is a UK labour law case regarding the National Minimum Wage Act 1998 and who is/is not included; it also considered whether a pupil barrister provides consideration to his/her master and/or chambers and whether that relationship demonstrated adequate intention. It held that pupil barristers are not included as either "apprentices" (as was held at first instance) or "workers" for the purposes of the Act but they do provide adequate consideration and intention to found a contract with their chambers.

== Facts ==
Rebecca Jane Edmonds was undertaking a criminal law pupillage with Michael Lawson QC's chambers, 23 Essex Street. She did an English degree, then a law degree, and after her Bar Vocational Course (BVC) she won an unfunded pupillage, consisting of two sets of six months with different barristers at the chambers.

Sullivan J held that Miss Edmonds was a worker. The chambers appealed.

== Judgment ==
Lord Bingham CJ, Pill LJ and Hale LJ held that the pupil was neither an apprentice nor a worker because of an absence of commitment to serve. He emphasised that at the end of the long procedure leading up to pupillage it would be surprising if there were no intention for a contract at all. The argument that there was no consideration, was better, but on balance pupils do provide consideration by agreeing to enter into a close, important and potentially very productive relationship. So there was a contract, but it was not argued that this was a contract of employment or service, but one of apprenticeship. As Blackburn J in The Parish of St Pancras Middlesex v The Parish of Clapham, Surrey (1860) 2 El & El 742, 754, "I have always thought that by 'apprentice' is meant one who gives his services in order to be taught." All the materials regarding the duties of pupillage imposed no duty to do anything not conducive to her own training and development. Because a pupil master could not withhold a practising certificate on any ground not directly related to the pupil's training, and since, unlike an apprentice, a pupil in general received no payment, there was no contract of apprenticeship, or employment within NMWA 1998 s 54(2), and she was not a worker under s 54(3).

The object of the National Minimum Wage Act 1998 was not, as we understand, to enlarge the categories of those entitled to be paid wages but to ensure that those entitled to be paid wages are not paid at anything less than a specified minimum level. ... It makes no difference that, if the pupil defaulted, the chambers would be most unlikely to sue; the same is true if an employer engages a junior employee under an employment contract which is undoubtedly binding, and the employee fails to turn up on the appointed day.

== Significance ==
Subsequently the Bar Council agreed to regulate the funding of pupillage, setting a minimum pupillage award of £10,000 a year, which at the time matched the minimum wage. This has since been increased to £12,000. As of January 2020, the rates are £18,866 in London and £16,322 elsewhere.
