= Cheltenham BC v Laird =

English contract law and UK labour law case

Cheltenham Borough Council v Laird
- Full case name: CHELTENHAM BOROUGH COUNCIL and CHRISTINE SUSAN LAIRD
- Citation: EWHC 1253 QB

Cheltenham Borough Council v Laird [2009] EWHC 1253 QB is an English contract law and UK labour law case concerning the right to seek damages for misrepresentation under the Misrepresentation Act 1967. It attracted considerable media attention due to the sums claimed in compensation and the politically charged facts of the case.

== Facts ==
In 2002 Mrs Christine Susan Laird applied to be Chief Executive of Cheltenham Borough Council, which was controlled by the Conservative Party. She was asked two questions in particular on her application form. The first was,

“Do you see yourself as disabled?”

She said "no". She was then asked whether she enjoyed good health. She replied, "yes".

The Conservatives had hired Mrs Laird to follow through a restructuring plan, but the Liberal Democrats were elected to control the council later that year. Mrs Laird was unsympathetic to the newly empowered officials, who were critical of some aspects of restructuring. She was engaged in litigation with various elected councillors for harassment, and filed complaints, all of which were dismissed by the Courts with costs awarded against her. She even sought a restraining order against the Liberal leader, Andrew McKinlay, which was never actioned because the Courts refused to enforce it.

In 2005 Mrs Laird took early retirement on the grounds of being permanently unfit for work on mental health grounds while serious disciplinary proceedings were being pursued against her by a Government nominated Designated Independent Person. During almost three years of working for the Council, Mrs Laird had taken almost half the time off with mental health sickness. The early retirement cost the Council £450,000s and she received a lump sum of £135,000s and an index linked pension for life of £37,605.

It emerged that Mrs Laird had previous bouts of mental health problems with previous employers with whom she had disagreements. The council brought this action claiming that her failure to disclose a previous history of mental illness had caused them to incur over £1 million (including interest) worth of costs. Mrs Laird submitted a counter claim for some tens of millions of pounds that she maintained would not have been won for the Council had it not been for her.

== Judgment ==
Hamblen J held that there had been no actionable misrepresentation, and so the council lost. He dismissed all of Mrs Laird's counter-claim and subsequently ordered that the council pay a portion, but not all of Mrs Laird's costs.

== See also ==
- Misrepresentation Act 1967 s 2(1)
