= Murray v Leisureplay plc =

- Court: Court of Appeal of England and Wales
- Citations: [2005] EWCA Civ 963, [2005] IRLR 946

Keywords
- Contract, remedies

Murray v Leisureplay plc [2005] EWCA Civ 963 is an English contract law case, concerning the termination of an agreement and penalty clauses.

== Facts ==
An employment contract said ‘in the event of wrongful termination by way of liquidated damages the company shall forthwith pay to the Executive a sum equal to one year’s gross salary, pension contributions and other benefits in kind.’ Leisureplay plc claimed that the bonus should be void as a penalty clause.

In the High Court, Burnton J held it was penal because no account was taken of the Executive’s duty to mitigate his loss.

== Judgment ==
The Court of Appeal held that the bonus was valid. Arden LJ held the clause was ‘generous’ but still liquidated damages, as it was not ‘extravagant or unconscionable’.

== See also ==
- English contract law
