= Wandsworth London Borough Council v D'Silva =

Wandsworth LBC v D ’ Silva
- Court: Court of Appeal
- Citation: [1998] IRLR 193

Keywords
- Incorporation, variation, mutual trust and confidence

Wandsworth LBC v D'Silva [1998] IRLR 193 is a UK labour law case, concerning mutual trust and confidence and the limit of power of employers to vary work conditions.

== Facts ==
Mr D'Silva claimed that Wandsworth LBC breached their employment contracts by attempting to unilaterally vary the Code of Practice on Staff Sickness, which came from a collective agreement with Unison. D'Silva's contract stated in paragraph 4: ‘[F]rom time to time variations in your terms and conditions of employment will occur, and these will be separately notified to you or otherwise incorporated in the documents to which you have reference.’ The council sought to reduce the period of sick leave from 12 to 6 months before an assessment of an employee for termination or redeployment would be made. The council argued the Code was not ‘apt’ to be incorporated.

== Judgment ==
The Court of Appeal held that the Code was not apt for incorporation, but if it had been, Lord Woolf MR said the following:

… the decision which the Industrial Tribunal came to on the first issue is not sustainable. If the language of the provisions which are to be amended are examined in the context of the scheme as a whole, they are not an appropriate foundation upon which to base contractual rights. If what was being triggered was a disciplinary or an appeal procedure, the position would probably be different. Both in the case of the short and the long term absentees the Code is doing no more than providing guidance for both the supervisors and the employees as to what is expected to happen. The Code does not set out what is contractually required to happen. The whole process in the initial stages is sensibly designed to be fl exible and informal in a way which is inconsistent with contractual rights being created. At later stages of the process proposed the employees’ arguments would have much more force. The appeal should therefore be allowed.

Having decided that the appeal should be allowed on the fi rst issue, it is not strictly necessary to express any views on the second issue. However, bearing in mind this is a test case it may be useful if some general guidance is given, although the relevance of the guidance will vary much depends on the context of the particular case.

The general position is that contracts of employment can only be varied by agreement. However in the employment fi eld an employer or for that matter an employee can reserve the ability to change a particular aspect of the contract unilaterally by notifying the other party as part of the contract that this is the situation. However, clear language is required to reserve to one party an unusual power of this sort. In addition the Court is unlikely to favour an interpretation which does more than enable a party to vary contractual provisions with which that party is required to comply. If therefore the provisions of the code which the Council were seeking to amend in this case were of a contractual nature, then they could well be capable of unilateral variation as the counsel contends. In relation to the provisions as to appeals the position would be likely to be different. To apply a power of unilateral variation to the rights which an employee is given under this part of the code could produce an unreasonable result and the courts in construing a contract of employment will seek to avoid such a result.

== See also ==
- UK labour law
