= Hall v Woolston Hall Leisure Ltd =

- Court: Court of Appeal
- Citation: [2000] EWCA Civ 170, [2001] ICR 99

Keywords
- Employee

Hall v Woolston Hall Leisure Ltd [2000] EWCA Civ 170 is a UK labour law case, concerning the illegality in the contract of employment.

== Facts ==
Mrs Hall was dismissed from being head chef at the Epping Forest Golf Club because she became pregnant. She claimed unfair dismissal based on the Equal Treatment Directive 76/207/EC and the Sex Discrimination Act 1975. However, in September 1994, she had received a raise to £250 and her payslip still showed £250 gross and £186.65 net, which apparently demonstrated tax avoidance. She asked and was told "It’s the way we do business." For five months she continued to work. The employer argued that because Mrs Hall was party to an illegal contract, she was not entitled to bring a claim for unfair dismissal.

The Tribunal held that Mrs Hall could not bring a discrimination claim, because she turned a blind eye to the Inland Revenue being defrauded. It held it could make a limited award of compensation, but not for financial loss.

== Judgment ==
The Court of Appeal held that Mrs Hall could bring her claim. Peter Gibson LJ held that her contract was initially lawful and she did not actively participate in the illegality. Her acquiescence was not causally linked to her sex discrimination. Public policy did not preclude her entitlement to a statutory claim under SDA 1975 ss 65 and 66. Moreover, the Equal Treatment Directive 76/207/EC was clearly contravened, and a remedy must be effective to fulfill the purpose embodied in the Directive.

41. In Markesinis and Deakin: Tort Law 4th ed. (1998) p. 710 it is said that for the defence to apply it is necessary to show that there was a causal link between the illegality in which the claimant was implicated and the loss of which he is now complaining. That is supported by the decision of this court in Cross v Kirkby, unreported, 18 February 2000. Beldam L.J., with whom Otton L.J. agreed, said (at para. 76) that for the ex turpi causa principle to operate, the claim made by the claimant must arise out of criminal or illegal conduct on his part, a causal connection between the illegal conduct and the claim being necessary. He continued:

"In my view the principle applies when the claimant's claim is so closely connected or inextricably bound up with his own criminal or illegal conduct that the court could not permit him to recover without appearing to condone that conduct."

In a similar vein Judge L.J. (at para 103) said:

"In my judgment, where the claimant is behaving unlawfully, or criminally, on the occasion when the cause of action in tort arises, his claim is not liable to be defeated ex turpi causa unless it is also established that the facts which give rise to it are inextricably linked with his criminal conduct."

42. As ss. 65 and 66 of the 1975 Act indicate, sex discrimination which is unlawful under the 1975 Act is a statutory tort, to which the tortious measure of damages is applicable if the remedy in s. 65 (1)(b) is that chosen by the Tribunal as being the just and equitable remedy (see Ministry of Defence v Cannock [1994] I.C.R. 918 at pp. 936-7). It therefore follows that the correct approach of the Tribunal in a sex discrimination case should be to consider whether the applicant's claim arises out of or is so clearly connected or inextricably bound up or linked with the illegal conduct of the applicant that the court could not permit the applicant to recover compensation without appearing to condone that conduct.

Mance LJ held that mere knowledge by the employee of the illegality is not enough. The employee must have actively participated in the illegality rather than have merely acquiesced in an employer's unlawful conduct.

80. [...] To introduce in the context of a sex discrimination claim the additional condition that the contract should have been performed legally and be enforceable as a contract under English law would, construing the Act in the light of the Directive, appear inappropriate. It would also mean, logically, that an employee who had participated in illegal performance of her contract of employment in the manner suggested in this case, would be debarred from pursuing not merely any claim for financial loss, but any other claim, including one for injury to feelings in the event of discrimination on the grounds of sex.

Moore-Bick J, concurred.

== See also ==
- United Kingdom labour law
- Hounga v Allen
