= Eastwood v Magnox Electric plc =

UK legal case

- Court: House of Lords
- Full case name: Eastwood v Magnox Electric plc; McCabe v Cornwall CC
- Decided: 15 July 2004
- Citations: [2004] UKHL 35, [2004] IRLR 732

Court membership
- Judges sitting: Lord Nicholls of Birkenhead, Lord Steyn, Lord Hoffmann, Lord Rodger of Earlsferry, Lord Brown of Eaton-under-Heywood

Keywords
- Wrongful dismissal

Eastwood v Magnox Electric plc [2004] UKHL 35 is a UK labour law case concerning damages for wrongful dismissal, which were held to not be limited if a breach of contract occurs during the performance of the contract, rather than at the point of termination.

== Facts ==
Mr Eastwood and Mr Williams, who supported Mr Eastwood in internal investigations, were victimised by the managers at Magnox Electric plc (where Mr Eastwood and Mr Williams were employed) and then sacked after false sexual harassment disciplinaries. They came to an unfair dismissal settlement and then claimed further for wrongful dismissal and damages for psychiatric illness because of breach of good faith.

The case was joined with Mr McCabe's claim, who had succeeded in an unfair dismissal claim on grounds that indecent behaviour towards school pupils was never demonstrated, he was not informed of the allegations for 5 months, and the council failed to investigate his case, and then he claimed further for psychiatric illness.

== Judgment ==
=== Court of Appeal ===
The Court of Appeal in Eastwood dismissed the appeal, but a different court in McCabe allowed the appeal.

Auld LJ, in McCabe, held that Gogay was distinguishable from Johnson because in Gogay damages related to dismissal but suspension ‘which manifestly contemplated the continuation of the employment relationship’. It was a question of fact whether the manner of dismissal is confined to events at the same time as or just before the actual dismissal. And ‘should the line be drawn between dismissal caught by legislation and conduct prior to it causing injury compensatable in damages at common law.’

=== House of Lords ===
The House of Lords awarded remedies for the employees in both cases. Although damages could not be claimed for any fault relating to the dismissal itself without reform through a statutory code, they could be claimed for breach of terms while the employment relationship subsisted.

Lord Nicholls said that the ‘Johnson exclusion area’ was grave. ‘This situation merits urgent attention by the government and legislature.’

Lord Steyn noted that the more outrageous the breach, the less likely it is that the employee can affirm the contract.

== See also ==
- UK labour law
- Unfair dismissal
