= Mallone v BPB Industries plc =

- Court: Court of Appeal
- Citation: [2002] EWCA Civ 126

Keywords
- Discretion, implied terms

Mallone v BPB Industries plc [2002] EWCA Civ 126 is a UK labour law case, concerning control of an employer's discretion.

== Facts ==
Mr Giovanni Mallone claimed compensation for BPB plc unreasonably withdrawing his share options after being dismissed. Mallone's contract, as a managing director of BPB's Italian subsidiary, incorporated a share option, where Rule 5(b)(iii) said options be awarded to terminated employees ‘as the directors in their absolute discretion shall determine’. They had passed a resolution under an express rule of the share option scheme, which allowed award of share options to terminated employees in ‘appropriate proportion’. He claimed their exercise of discretion was unreasonable.

== Judgment ==
The Court of Appeal held the use of the employer's discretion was unreasonable in withdrawing the share options. Rix LJ said the following.

34. Mr Randall submitted that the committee's decision could not be so stigmatised. It had an "absolute discretion". The judge had accepted Mr Heard's evidence that the committee had taken into account Mr Mallone's performance, the circumstances of his dismissal (which Mr Randall pointed out included the fact that Mr Mallone had been offered alternative employment within the group, in England), and their understanding that Mr Mallone would receive Lire 1 billion in compensation. That was, he stated (albeit this was not a matter in evidence), greatly more than an executive in his position would have received by way of compensation under English law. …

…

37. Mr Randall accepted and indeed said he adopted that reasoning, but in a case such as the present sought to argue that irrationality could best be judged by the standard of good faith, viz. not to act dishonestly, for an improper purpose, capriciously or arbitrarily, and that none of these things could be said or had been found of the committee. In this connection he cited Nash v Paragon Finance [2001] EWCA 1466. That was concerned with a mortgage with a variable interest rate clause. It was alleged that the mortgagee's discretion to vary the interest rate could not be exercised unreasonably. This court rejected the implication of such a term. Having considered Abu Dhabi National Tanker Co v Product Star Shipping Ltd (The Product Star) (No 2) [1993] 1 Lloyd's Rep 397 and Gan Insurance Co Ltd v Tai Ping Insurance Co Ltd (No 2) [2001] 2 All ER (Comm) 299, this court adopted the solution of those two earlier decisions which was to apply a less restricted limitation analogous to unreasonableness in the Wednesbury sense: Associated Provincial Picture Houses Ltd v Wednesbury Corporation [1948] 1 KB 223; or what Mance LJ in the latter case called "unreasonableness in the sense of conduct or a decision to which no reasonable person having the relevant discretion could have subscribed" (at para 64). In Nash Dyson LJ then said (at para 41):

"So here too, we find a somewhat reluctant extension of the implied term to include unreasonableness that is analogous to Wednesbury unreasonableness. I entirely accept that the scope of an implied term will depend on the circumstances of the particular contract. But I fi nd the analogy of Gan Insurance and the cases considered in the judgment of Mance LJ helpful. It is one thing to imply that a lender will not exercise his discretion in a way that no reasonable lender, acting reasonably, would do. It is unlikely that a lender who was acting in that way would not also be acting either dishonestly, for an improper purpose, capriciously or arbitrarily. It is quite another matter to imply a term that the lender would not impose unreasonable rates."

38. Mr Randall submitted that because there was no finding of dishonesty, improper motive, capriciousness or arbitrariness against BPB in this case, therefore the judge must have been mistaken to have found that the committee's decision had been one that "no reasonable employer could have reached" (see at para 28 above).

39. I cannot accept that submission. One could debate whether an employer could act irrationally (using that term for acting as no reasonable employer would act) without it also being said that he was acting in one of the other ways described. In many cases that might be so: but I am unwilling to say that it is necessarily so. Perhaps irrationality and arbitrariness are very close to the same thing. But I think that someone may act irrationally while being honest; and as Burton J suggested in Clark v Nomura, capriciousness is something else (eg deciding on the basis of the colour of someone's hair or eyes). I would be reluctant to contemplate, on the facts found by the judge, that some epithet for the committee's decision other than that chosen by the judge himself should be used. I can see no ground for doing so.

40. The question remains whether the judge was justified to make the finding of irrationality that he did. In my judgment he was. The directors had what is called an absolute discretion: but their discretion still remained one to find "the appropriate proportion". The proviso indicates that, at any rate prima facie and subject to the director's discretion, the appropriate proportion is to be found by taking the length of the participant's service following the grant of an option.

Wilson J and Waller LJ agreed.

== See also ==
- UK labour law
