= The Post Office v Roberts =

- Court: High Court
- Citation: [1980] IRLR 347

Keywords
- Trust and confidence

The Post Office v Roberts [1980] IRLR 347 is a UK labour law case, concerning mutual trust and confidence.

== Facts ==
Ms Roberts claimed that her employer breached a duty of mutual trust and confidence. A Post Office supervisor, Mr O’Keefe, wrote on Ms Roberts’ personal records, without any basis, that she was irresponsible, lacked industry and comprehension skills, and this hindered her application for an office transfer.

== Judgment ==
Talbot J held that the Post Office breached mutual trust and confidence by recording unfounded criticism of its employee. He said ‘We do not think it helpful’ to ask if the ‘behaviour was deliberate or malicious’. It was only relevant that mutual trust and confidence is breached.

== See also ==
- UK labour law
