= Woods v WM Car Services (Peterborough) Ltd =

- Court: Court of Appeal
- Citation: [1982] ICR 693

Keywords
- Unfair dismissal

Woods v WM Car Services (Peterborough) Ltd [1982] ICR 693 is a UK labour law case, concerning unfair dismissal, now governed by the Employment Rights Act 1996.

== Facts ==
Ms Woods was Chief Secretary and Accounts Clerk and the business’ new owners thought she was overpaid. She went to solicitors after they requested she accept less or work more. They suggested job title changes, and were planning to insist on them. Ms Woods’ solicitor advised her to resign and claim constructive dismissal. ‘All trust and confidence was lost on both sides.’

The Employment Tribunal held there was no constructive dismissal. The Employment Appeal Tribunal would have reversed this, but felt they were bound by Pedersen v Camden LBC.

== Judgment ==
Lord Denning MR that the tribunal could not be overturned on its finding of fact unless there was a misdirection in law or the decision was perverse. He recounted Horton v McMurty where giving hints to the jury Pollock CB said ‘Gentlemen, I believe it is for you to decide whether this was a proper ground of dismissal - but if it be a matter of law… my opinion is that it is a good ground of dismissal.’

As an addendum, he added, ‘I hope that this may lead to the shortening of the hearings before the industrial tribunals and the length of their reasons. At any rate it should reduce the number of appeals to the appeal tribunal.’

Watkins LJ concurred, on even stronger grounds saying, ‘The obdurate refusal of the employee to accept conditions very properly and sensibly being sought to be imposed upon her was unreasonable.’

== See also ==
- UK labour law
