= Malik v Bank of Credit and Commerce International SA =

Malik v BCCI SA
- Court: House of Lords
- Decided: 12 June 1997
- Citation: [1997] UKHL 23; [1998] AC 20; [1997] 3 All ER 1; [1997] IRLR 462; [1997] 3 WLR 95; [1997] ICR 606

Court membership
- Judges sitting: Lord Goff of Chieveley, Lord Mackay of Clashfern, Lord Mustill, Lord Nicholls of Birkenhead, Lord Steyn

Case opinions
- Lord Steyn

Keywords
- Implied terms, mutual trust and confidence

Malik and Mahmud v Bank of Credit and Commerce International SA [1997] UKHL 23 is a leading English contract law and UK labour law case, which confirmed the existence of the implied term of mutual trust and confidence in all contracts of employment.

== Facts ==
Mr Malik and Mr Mahmud both worked for the Bank of Credit and Commerce International. BCCI went insolvent due to massive fraud, connection with terrorists, money-laundering, extortion and a raft of other criminal activity on a global scale. Malik and Mahmud had both lost their jobs and they sought employment elsewhere. They could not find jobs. They sued the company for their loss of job prospects, alleging that their failure to secure new jobs was due to the reputational damage they had suffered from working with BCCI. Nobody, they said, wanted to hire people from a massive fraud operation like that at the company. This raised the question of what duty the company had owed to its employees that had been broken. Although there was no express term in their contracts, Malik and Mahmud argued there was an implied term in their employment contract that nothing would be done calculated to undermine mutual trust and confidence.

== Judgement ==
The House of Lords unanimously held that the term of mutual trust and confidence would be implied into the contract as a necessary incident of the employment relation. This was a term implied by law. Lord Nicholls said the following.

The contrary argument of principle is that since the purpose of the trust and confidence term is to preserve the employment relationship and to enable that relationship to prosper and continue, the losses recoverable for breach should be confined to those flowing from the premature termination of the relationship. Thus, a breach of the term should not be regarded as giving rise to recoverable losses beyond those I have described as premature termination losses. In this way, the measure of damages would be commensurate with, and not go beyond, the scope of the protection the trust and confidence term is intended to provide for the employee. This is an unacceptably narrow evaluation of the trust and confidence term. Employers may be under no common law obligation, through the medium of an implied contractual term of general application, to take steps to improve their employees' future job prospects. But failure to improve is one thing, positively to damage is another. Employment, and job prospects, are matters of vital concern to most people. Jobs of all descriptions are less secure than formerly, people change jobs more frequently, and the job market is not always buoyant. Everyone knows this. An employment contract creates a close personal relationship, where there is often a disparity of power between the parties. Frequently the employee is vulnerable. Although the underlying purpose of the trust and confidence term is to protect the employment relationship, there can be nothing unfairly onerous or unreasonable in requiring an employer who breaches the trust and confidence term to be liable if he thereby causes continuing financial loss of a nature that was reasonably foreseeable. Employers must take care not to damage their employees' future employment prospects, by harsh and oppressive behaviour or by any other form of conduct which is unacceptable today as falling below the standards set by the implied trust and confidence term.

Lord Steyn said the term, as it had evolved, was a ‘sound development’. He continued.

Such implied terms operate as default rules. The parties are free to exclude or modify them. But is common ground that in the present case the particular terms of the contracts of employment of the two applicants could not affect an implied obligation of mutual trust and confidence... It was a change in legal culture which made possible the evolution of the implied term of trust and confidence... The motives of the employer cannot be determinative, or even relevant, in judging the employees’ claims for damages for breach of the implied obligation. If conduct objectively considered is likely to cause serious damage to the relationship between employer and employee a breach of the implied obligation may arise.

The principle was not limited by any rule that an employee had to know of the breach while the employment relationship subsisted, since if that ‘were right it would mean that an employer who successfully concealed dishonest and corrupt practices before termination of the relationship cannot in law commit a breach of the implied obligation whereas the dishonest and corrupt employer who is exposed during the relationship can be held liable in damages.

== See also ==
- Wilson v Racher
- Liverpool CC v Irwin
- Commonwealth Bank of Australia v Barker [2014] HCA 32, High Court of Australia rejected a duty of mutual trust and confidence
