= Wilson v Racher =

UK labour law case concerning constructive dismissal

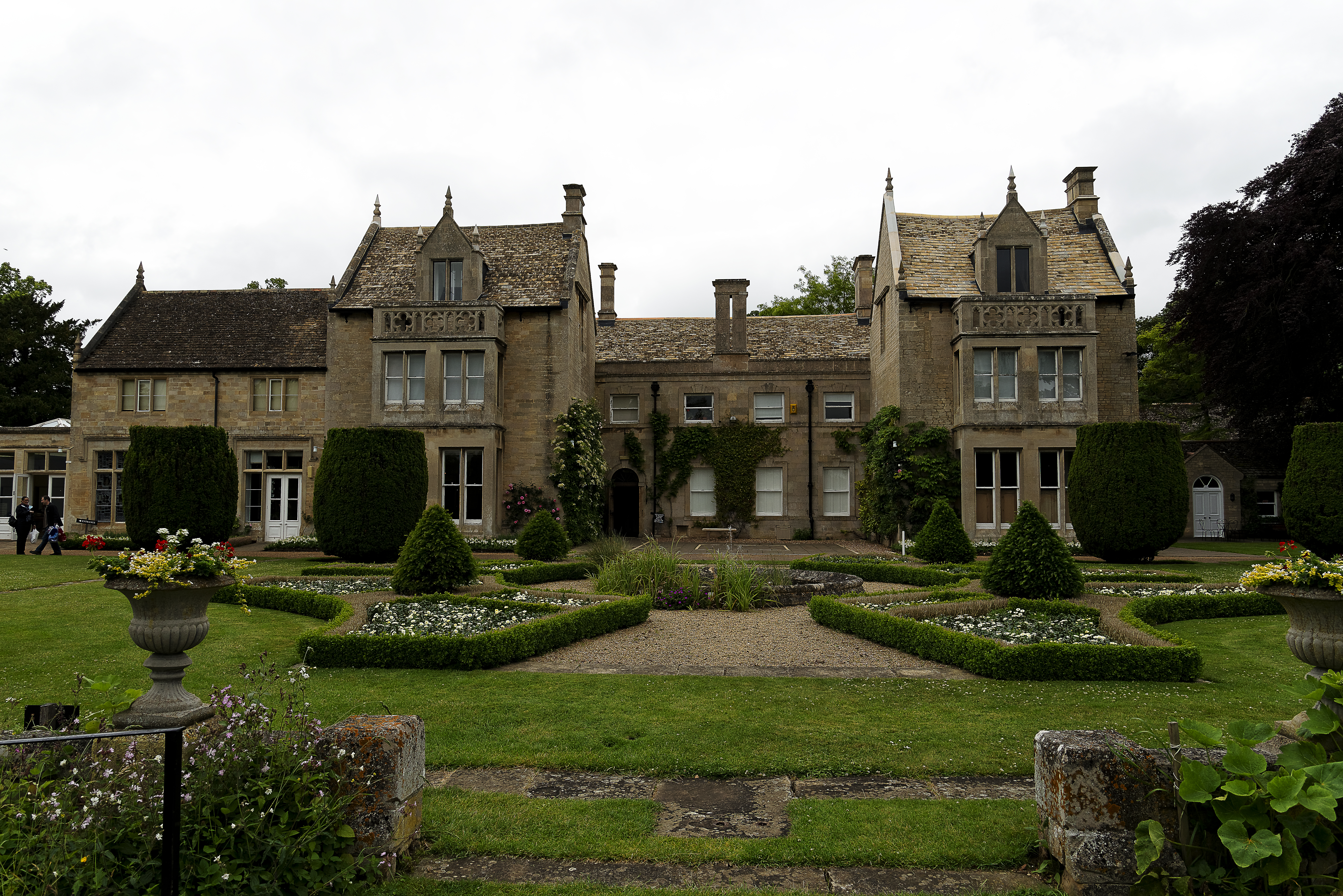
- Court: Court of Appeal
- Decided: 15 February 1974
- Citation: [1974] ICR 428, [1974] IRLR 114

Court membership
- Judges sitting: Edmund Davies LJ, Cairns LJ and James LJ

Keywords
- Wrongful dismissal

Wilson v Racher [1974] ICR 428 is a UK labour law case concerning constructive dismissal. It serves as an example of an employer being found to have wrongfully dismissed an employee, because of the employer's own bad behaviour. Edmund-Davies LJ also made an important statement about the modern employment relationship,

What would today be regarded as almost an attitude of Czar-serf, which is to be found in some of the older cases where a dismissed employee failed to recover damages, would, I venture to think, be decided differently today. We have by now come to realise that a contract of service imposes upon the parties a duty of mutual respect.

== Facts ==
Mr Wilson, a "man of considerable competence" was the head gardener of an 80-acre (320,000 m^{2}) estate at Tolethorpe Hall, Little Casterton, Stamford. He was employed by Mr Racher. He was employed for a fixed period of six months and his contract said this.

“Your employment will commence on April 24, 1972, and shall continue thereafter unless and until terminated by either of us by notice in writing expiring on October 23, 1972, or any anniversary of that date.”

When the two men first met there was "a complete conflict of personalities" and Mr Racher sacked Mr Wilson on June 11. Mr Wilson claimed this was wrongful dismissal. Mr Racher claimed the dismissal was for incompetence and misconduct, though the former allegation was dropped during trial. The question was whether the dismissal - i.e. termination of the contract - on grounds of misconduct was wrongful.

== Judgment ==
Edmund Davies LJ, with whom Cairns LJ and James LJ concurred, held that in fact it was Mr Racher responsible for the breakdown of the employment relationship and that he had dismissed Mr Wilson unfairly.

There is no rule of thumb to determine what misconduct on the part of a servant justifies summary termination of his contract. For the purpose of the present case, the test is whether the plaintiff's conduct was insulting and insubordinate to such a degree as to be incompatible with the continuance of the relation of master and servant: per Hill J in Edwards v Levy (1860) 2 F&F 94, 95. The application of such test will, of course, lead to varying results according to the nature of the employment and all the circumstances of the case. Reported decisions provide useful, but only general guides, each case turning upon its own facts. Many of the decisions which are customarily cited in these cases date from the last century and may be wholly out of accord with current social conditions. What would today be regarded as almost an attitude of Czar-serf, which is to be found in some of the older cases where a dismissed employee failed to recover damages, would, I venture to think, be decided differently today. We have by now come to realise that a contract of service imposes upon the parties a duty of mutual respect.

What happened on Sunday June 11, emerges from the judge's clear and helpful judgment, in which he reviews all the facts and sets out his findings. This court lacks the advantage of seeing and hearing the witnesses which was enjoyed by the judge. It needs to be stressed that the defendant now challenges none of the findings of fact. The story began on the preceding Friday afternoon when the plaintiff had been trimming a new yew hedge with an electric cutter. It was a damp afternoon, but the plaintiff carried on, taking shelter when the rain became heavy and then resuming his work when conditions improved. But at about 3.45 p.m. the rain was so heavy that the plaintiff could not continue because there was danger of his being electrocuted by the cutter. He then proceeded to oil and clean his tools until his day's work was over. But he did make one mistake. He left a ladder leaning against a young yew hedge, which was an unfortunate thing to do. To that extent, the plaintiff was guilty of some dereliction of duty. But on the Sunday afternoon that was by no means the only topic discussed between the parties. It was after luncheon that the defendant and his wife and three young children were in the garden when the plaintiff passed and greeted them. The defendant asked where he was going, and the plaintiff replied that he was going to the garden shed to get his boots. Thereafter the defendant showered the plaintiff with questions. He shouted at him, and he was very aggressive. He accused the plaintiff of leaving his work prematurely on the Friday afternoon. The plaintiff explained that he had stopped cutting the hedge only because it would have been dangerous to continue, whereupon the defendant said, “I am not bothered about you, Wilson, that's your lookout.” Though there was some reference to the ladder, the defendant did not make clear what his complaint was. But when the defendant accused the plaintiff of shirking his work on the Friday afternoon, there is no doubt that the plaintiff used most regrettable language, and it is part of my unpleasant duty to repeat it so as to make clear what happened. The plaintiff said: “If you remember it was pissing with rain on Friday. Do you expect me to get fucking wet?” The judge, who found that Mrs. Racher and the children did not hear those words, said:

“The plaintiff had a clear conscience, and he did reply somewhat robustly when he expressed the state of the weather. I think he felt under a certain amount of grievance at that remark.”

According to the judge, “The defendant then moved to what he thought was stronger ground,” thereby obviously referring to his determination to get rid of the plaintiff. The judge dealt with an allegation about a line of string having been left in the garden by the plaintiff, and commented:

“A more trivial complaint it would be difficult to imagine … It was an extremely trivial ground of complaint, if indeed justified at all. I think it is clear from this and other evidence that [the defendant] sets very high standards and this seems to me to be an absurdly high standard of tidiness. The defendant's second barrel is very odd and illustrates that the defendant was determined to get the plaintiff on something.”

There was a dispute as to whether the string belonged to the plaintiff or to the defendant, and there was a complaint about leaving other things lying about. The judge accepted that the plaintiff moved away in an attempt to avoid any further altercation. But he was called back, and was then bombarded with questions. The defendant was going on at him, and this was, indeed, confirmed to some extent by the evidence of the defendant himself. Finally, the plaintiff told the defendant, “Get stuffed,” and “Go and shit yourself.”

These last two expressions were used by the plaintiff immediately before he was dismissed. He later apologised to Mrs. Racher for using such language, as to which the judge said, “One cannot condone them or commend them, but he said that when subjected to a number of petty criticisms and was not being allowed to go.” Despite the use of such language, the judge held that the plaintiff was entitled to say that he had been wrongly dismissed. Following upon the incident of June 11, the defendant sent to the plaintiff on June 16, a letter in the following terms:

“In accordance with the terms of the service agreement between us I hereby give you one month's notice from the date of this letter, which confirms my oral notice given to you on Sunday, June 11, 1972. You will appreciate that no matter what your abilities as a gardener are, there can be no question of your remaining in my employment when you choose to use obscene four-letter words in the direct presence of my wife and in particular my children.”

The judge held that Mrs. Racher heard the second lot of expressions, but there was no finding as to whether the children had heard them.

Mr. Connell, who appeared for the defendant below, has with admirable clarity submitted that the judge arrived at a wrong finding. He rightly stresses the domestic nature of this particular contract of service, and says that, the plaintiff being engaged in a family setting, obscene language of the kind admittedly used by him could not possibly be tolerated. At one stage he submitted that so bad was the language that the plaintiff must be regarded as having himself repudiated the contract of service. But no such plea was advanced either in the defence or, as appears from the judgment, at the hearing. The sole question that accordingly arises is whether the language most regrettably employed by the plaintiff constituted such conduct as made the continuance of the contract of service impossible.

One of the cases that Mr. Connell referred to, Edwards v Levy (1860) 2 F. & F. 94 was decided over 100 years ago. Hill J there said, at p. 95:

“… as to behaving in an unbecoming manner, a single instance of insolence on the part of a gentleman employed in such a capacity would hardly justify dismissal; …”

A little later, in directing the jury, he said at p. 97 that one of the main questions was whether

“the plaintiff was guilty of such insulting and insubordinate conduct as to be incompatible with the continuance of the relationship subsisting between him and the defendant” — his employer — “as precluded the defendant from retaining him in his employ. … The parties met and were angry; some angry expressions escaped each of them. the defendant, according to the weight of evidence, first used provoking words; the plaintiff replied in the same way; the defendant desired him to go; the plaintiff said he was quite ready, and if the defendant desired him he must send for him. That last expression, coupled with the letter sent the next morning, seem to show that he was ready to continue in the employ.”

In that case, decided 114 years ago, the jury found for the plaintiff.

Pepper v Webb [1969] 1 W.L.R. 514, a case which Mr. Connell seemed to regard as affording some measure of support for his argument, appears to me, on the other hand, to do nothing of the kind. In that case also the plaintiff was a gardener, but there was a history of complaints of insolence and inefficiency from time to time. The culminating incident was when the employer asked the plaintiff what arrangements he had made in relation to a greenhouse in his absence during the weekend. The plaintiff said: “I couldn't care less about your bloody greenhouse or your sodding garden,” and walked away. Harman L.J. there said, at p. 517:

“Now what will justify an instant dismissal? — something done by the employee which impliedly or expressly is a repudiation of the fundamental terms of the contract; and in my judgment if ever there was such a repudiation this is it. What is the gardener to do? He is to look after the garden and he is to look after the greenhouse. If he does not care a hoot about either then he is repudiating his contract. That is what it seems to me the plaintiff did, and I do not see, having done that, that he can complain if he is summarily dismissed. It is said on his behalf that one act of temper, one insolent outburst, does not merit so condign a punishment. But this, according to the defendant, his employer, and I think rightly on the evidence, was the last straw. He had been acting in a very unsatisfactory way ever since April.”

And this was an incident which had occurred in June. That the court were there having regard not simply to the last incident of June 10, in isolation, but to the whole history, appears also from the other judgments, Russell L.J., for example, saying, at p. 518:

“I entirely agree that, against the background of what the plaintiff's counsel must admit the deputy county court judge found or assumed to be quite a number of disobediences and a certain amount of insolence, it must be taken as conduct repudiatory of the contract justifying summary dismissal.”

The present case, too, has to be looked at against the whole background. On the judge's findings, here was a competent, diligent and efficient gardener who, apart from one complaint of leaving a ladder against a yew tree, had done nothing which could be regarded as blame-worthy by any reasonable employer. Here, too, was an employer who was resolved to get rid of him; an employer who would use every barrel in the gun that he could find, or thought available; and an employer who was provocative from the outset and dealt with the plaintiff in an unseemly manner. The plaintiff lost his temper. He used obscene and deplorable language. He was therefore deserving of the severest reproof. But this was a solitary occasion. Unlike Pepper v Webb, there was no background either of inefficiency or of insolence. The plaintiff tried to avert the situation by walking away, but he was summoned back and the defendant continued his gadfly activity of goading him into intemperate language. Such are the findings of the county court judge.

In those circumstances, would it be just to say that the plaintiff's use of this extremely bad language on a solitary occasion made impossible the continuance of the master and servant relationship, and showed that the plaintiff was indeed resolved to follow a line of conduct which made the continuation of that relationship impossible? The judge thought the answer to that question was clear, and I cannot say that he was manifestly wrong. On the contrary, it seems to me that the parties could have made up their differences. The plaintiff apologised to Mrs. Racher. There are no grounds for thinking that if the defendant had given him a warning that such language would not be tolerated, and further, if he had manifested recognition that he himself had acted provocatively, the damage done might well have been repaired and some degree of harmony restored. Perhaps there was such instinctive antipathy between the two men that the defendant would, nevertheless, have been glad to get rid of the plaintiff when October 23, 1972, arrived.

In my judgment, in the light of the findings of fact the judge arrived at a just decision. that is not to say that language such as that employed by the plaintiff is to be tolerated. On the contrary, it requires very special circumstances to entitle a servant who expresses his feelings in such a grossly improper way to succeed in an action for wrongful dismissal. But there were special circumstances here, and they were of the defendant's own creation. The plaintiff, probably lacking the educational advantages of the defendant, and finding himself in a frustrating situation despite his efforts to escape from it, fell into the error of explosively using this language. To say that he ought to be kicked out because on this solitary occasion he fell into such grave error would, in my judgment, be wrong. I am not persuaded that the judge was in error in holding that that was unfair dismissal, that it was wrongful dismissal, and that the plaintiff was entitled to the damages awarded. I would therefore be for dismissing the appeal.

Cairns LJ

I agree that this appeal should be dismissed for the reasons which Edmund Davies LJ has given, and I only add, out of respect for the argument addressed to the court by Mr. Connell on behalf of the defendant, a few words about the other authority which he cited, namely, Laws v London Chronicle (Indicator Newspapers) Ltd [1959] 1 WLR 698 . That was a case where the plaintiff had been dismissed for disobedience. Lord Evershed MR in the course of a judgment with which the other members of the court, Jenkins and Willmer LJJ, agreed, said, at p. 701:

“… one act of disobedience or misconduct can justify dismissal only if it is of a nature which goes to show (in effect) that the servant is repudiating the contract, or one of its essential conditions; and for that reason, therefore, I think that you find in the passages I have read that the disobedience must at least have the quality that it is ‘wilful’: it does (in other words) connote a deliberate flouting of the essential contractual conditions.”

There is certainly nothing more essential to the contractual relation between master and servant than the duty of obedience. Another duty on the part of the servant, particularly in the case of a man in such employment as this plaintiff had, a gardener in a domestic situation, is the duty of courtesy and respect towards the employer and his family. That is an important part of his obligations. But I would apply to that duty the same considerations as Lord Evershed M.R. applied in relation to the duty of obedience. In my view, this was not a case where it can be said with any justice to the plaintiff that the way in which he behaved, regrettable though it was, was such as to show “deliberate flouting of the essential contractual conditions,” having regard to the unjust accusation which had been made against him.

I think it would have been wrong for the judge to have come to any other conclusion than that this was a wrongful dismissal.

James LJ

I agree with the conclusions and the reasons expressed in the judgments already delivered. I, too, would dismiss the appeal.

== See also ==
- UK labour law
