= Autoclenz Ltd v Belcher =

2011 UK legal case

- Court: Supreme Court of the United Kingdom
- Decided: 27 July 2011
- Citation: [2011] UKSC 41
- Transcripts: Full transcript of judgment and press summary

Case history
- Prior actions: [2009] EWCA Civ 1046, [2010] IRLR 70

Court membership
- Judges sitting: Lord Hope, Lord Walker, Lord Collins, Lord Clarke and Lord Wilson

Case opinions
- Lord Clarke

Keywords
- Contract of employment, zero hours contracts

Autoclenz Ltd v Belcher [2011] UKSC 41 is a landmark UK labour law and English contract law case decided by the Supreme Court of the United Kingdom, concerning the scope of statutory protection of rights for working individuals. It confirmed the view, also taken by the Court of Appeal, that the relative bargaining power of the parties must be taken into account when deciding whether a person counts as an employee, to get employment rights. As Lord Clarke said,

the relative bargaining power of the parties must be taken into account in deciding whether the terms of any written agreement in truth represent what was agreed and the true agreement will often have to be gleaned from all the circumstances of the case, of which the written agreement is only a part. This may be described as a purposive approach to the problem.

== Facts ==
Twenty car valeters, including Mr Paul Huntington and Mr Belcher, worked for Autoclenz Ltd in Measham, Derbyshire. Autoclenz Ltd had contracted with British Car Auctions Ltd (BCA) to provide valeting services. The valeters engaged by Autoclenz claimed holiday pay and pay at the rate of the national minimum wage. They had each signed contracts describing them as self-employed. Paul Huntington worked full-time from 1991 until the hearing before the Employment Tribunal (and thereafter) except for a few weeks working for a competitor in 2002 and 2003. In 2007, Autoclenz Ltd invited the valeters to sign new contracts, purportedly clarifying that they were sub-contractors and not employees, that they must provide their own cleaning materials, that there was no obligation to provide services to Autoclenz and nor did Autoclenz have any obligation to offer work to the valeters. Furthermore, there was a term that a valeter could provide a suitably qualified substitute. Autoclenz made a 5% charge for materials, and a charge for insurance. The individuals wore the BCA logo on uniforms for security reasons. Autoclenz contended that the individuals were not 'workers' for the purposes of the statutory definitions of that term in the Working Time Regulations 1998 and the National Minimum Wage Act 1998.

== Judgement ==
=== Employment Tribunal ===
At the Employment Tribunal, Employment Judge Foxwell held that the claimants were employees and that even if they were not, they were workers. Judge Peter Clark in the Employment Appeal Tribunal held that the claimants were not employees but that they were workers, following the decision of the Court of Appeal in Consistent Group Ltd v Kalwak.

The company appealed against the finding that the individuals were workers, and the individuals then cross-appealed against the finding that they were not employees.

=== Court of Appeal ===
Smith LJ held that the car valeters were employees despite the contract describing them as self-employed. Employers and their advisers cannot draft their way out of employment status if that does not accord with the reality of the relationship:

Rimer LJ's exposition at paragraph 40 of his judgment [in the Kalwak case, Consistent Group v Kalwak [2007] IRLR 560] and his reference to Snook's case, was not helpful in all cases. Where one party was relying on the genuineness of an express term and the other party was disputing it, there was no need to show that there had been a common intention to mislead. That was particularly so in a contract in the employment field where it was not uncommon to find that the 'employer' was in a position to dictate the written terms and the other party was obliged to sign the document or not get the work. In such a case, there was no need to show an intention to mislead anyone; it was enough that the written term did not represent the intentions or expectations of the parties.

... in cases where there is a dispute as to the genuineness of a written term in a contract, the focus of the enquiry must be to discover the actual legal obligations of the parties. To carry out that exercise, the tribunal will have to examine all the relevant evidence. That will, of course, include the written term itself, read in the context of the whole agreement. It will also include evidence of how the parties conducted themselves in practice and what their expectations of each other were.

... It matters not how many times an employer proclaims that he is engaging a man as a self-employed contractor; if he then imposes requirements on that man which are the obligations of an employee and the employee goes along with them, the true nature of the contractual relationship is that of employer and employee.

Aikens LJ concurred in the result, but said that he would put the point in his own words.

As Smith LJ has stated in her judgment, section 230(3)(b) of the ERA sets out the statutory definition of a "worker" and that sub-section divides "workers" into two sub-groups. Paragraph (a) states that an individual who has entered into or works under a "contract of employment" is a "worker". So, as Smith LJ states, an employee is a "sub-group" of "worker". The ERA does not further define a contract of employment and there is no other statutory definition of the expression. There have been numerous cases where judges have had to decide whether a person has entered into or works under a contract of employment. In essence there are four basic requirements that must be fulfilled before it can be said that there is a contract of employment and so a relationship of employer and employee. First, the employer must have undertaken to provide the employee with work for pay. Secondly, the employee must have undertaken to perform work for pay. Those obligations are mutual. The third requirement is that the employee must have undertaken to perform the work personally; he is not entitled to sub-contract the work to another. Fourthly, it is also generally accepted that there is a further requirement before a court will hold that there is a contract of employment between employer and employee, i.e. that the employee agrees that he will be subject to the control of the employer to a certain minimum degree. These obligations have been described as the ‘irreducible minimum’ to produce a contract of employment: Nethermere (St Neots) Ltd v Gardiner [1984] ICR 612 at 623 per Stephenson LJ.

... Speaking for myself, I would respectfully suggest that it is not helpful to say that a court or tribunal has to consider whether the words of the written contract represent the "true intention" or the "true expectation" of the parties. There is a danger that a court or tribunal might concentrate too much on what were the private intentions or expectations of the parties. What the parties privately intended or expected (either before or after the contract was agreed) may be evidence of what, objectively discerned, was actually agreed between the parties: see Lord Hoffmann's speech in the Chartbrook case [footnotes omitted]. But ultimately what matters is only what was agreed, either as set out in the written terms or, if it is alleged those terms are not accurate, what is proved to be their actual agreement at the time the contract was concluded. I accept, of course, that the agreement may not be express; it may be implied. But the court or tribunal's task is still to ascertain what was agreed.

... I respectfully agree with the view, emphasised by both Smith and Sedley LJJ, that the circumstances in which contracts relating to work or services are concluded are often very different from those in which commercial contracts between parties of equal bargaining power are agreed. I accept that, frequently, organisations which are offering work or requiring services to be provided by individuals are in a position to dictate the written terms which the other party has to accept.

Sedley LJ concurred with Aikens LJ. He said,

While I share [Smith LJ's] reasons for reaching this conclusion, I do so less hesitantly. I am also entirely content to adopt the reasoning of Lord Justice Aikens, recognising as it does that while employment is a matter of contract, the factual matrix in which the contract is cast is not ordinarily the same as that of an arms'-length commercial contract.

=== Supreme Court ===
Lord Hope, Lord Walker, Lord Collins, Lord Clarke and Lord Wilson, on appeal, unanimously held that the car valeters were engaged under contracts of employment and this was not affected by the clauses which stated that they were self-employed, had no obligation to work, no right to receive work, and could substitute another worker. Lord Clarke, giving the judgement of the court, emphasised that a contract of employment was a specific kind of contract, not to be treated the same as commercial contracts, because there may be an element of inequality of bargaining power. The judgement of Rimer LJ, in Consistent Group Ltd v Kalwak, suggesting that contractual documents contained the expression of the true intentions of the parties unless there was a sham, intended to deceive third parties, was expressly doubted. Accordingly, under the valeters were employees and 'workers' as defined and were entitled both to remuneration at the rate of the national minimum wage and to paid leave.

19. As Smith LJ explained in the Court of Appeal at para 11, the classic description of a contract of employment (or a contract of service as it used to be called) is found in the judgment of MacKenna J in Ready Mixed Concrete (South East) Ltd v Minister of Pensions and National Insurance [1968] 2 QB 497, 515C:
  A contract of service exists if these three conditions are fulfilled. (i) The servant agrees that, in consideration of a wage or other remuneration, he will provide his own work and skill in the performance of some service for his master. (ii) He agrees, expressly or impliedly, that in the performance of that service he will be subject to the other's control in a sufficient degree to make that other master. (iii) The other provisions of the contract are consistent with its being a contract of service. ... Freedom to do a job either by one's own hands or by another's is inconsistent with a contract of service, though a limited or occasional power of delegation may not be."
20. Three further propositions are not I think contentious:
  - i) As Stephenson LJ put it in Nethermere (St Neots) Ltd v Gardiner [1984] ICR 612, 623, "There must ... be an irreducible minimum of obligation on each side to create a contract of service".
  - ii) If a genuine right of substitution exists, this negates an obligation to perform work personally and is inconsistent with employee status: Express & Echo Publications Ltd v Tanton (Tanton) [1999] ICR 693, per Peter Gibson LJ at p 699G.
  - iii) If a contractual right, as for example a right to substitute, exists, it does not matter that it is not used. It does not follow from the fact that a term is not enforced that such a term is not part of the agreement: see eg Tanton at p 697G.
21. The essential question in each case is what were the terms of the agreement. The position under the ordinary law of contract is clear. It was correctly summarised thus by Aikens LJ in the Court of Appeal:
  87. ... Express contracts (as opposed to those implied from conduct) can be oral, in writing or a mixture of both. Where the terms are put in writing by the parties and it is not alleged that there are any additional oral terms to it, then those written terms will, at least prima facie represent the whole of the parties' agreement. Ordinarily the parties are bound by those terms where a party has signed the contract: see eg L'Estrange v F Graucob Ltd [1934] 2 KB 394. If a party has not signed a contract, then there are the usual issues as to whether he was made sufficiently aware of the clauses for a court to be able to conclude that he agreed to the terms in them. That is not an issue in this case.
  88. Once it is established that the written terms of the contract were agreed, it is not possible to imply terms into a contract that are inconsistent with its express terms. The only way it can be argued that a contract contains a term which is inconsistent with one of its express terms is to allege that the written terms do not accurately reflect the true agreement of the parties.
  89. Generally, if a party to a contract claims that a written term does not accurately reflect what was agreed between the parties, the allegation is that there was a continuing common intention to agree another term, which intention was outwardly manifested but, because of a mistake (usually a common mistake of the parties, but it can be a unilateral one) the contract inaccurately recorded what was agreed. If such a case is made out, a court may grant rectification of a contract. See, generally, the discussion in the speech of Lord Hoffmann, [48] to [66], in Chartbrook Ltd v Persimmon Homes Ltd [2009] UKHL 38, [2009] 1 AC 1101 with whom all the other law lords agreed. ...
22. Nothing in this judgment is intended in any way to alter those principles, which apply to ordinary contracts and, in particular, to commercial contracts. There is, however, a body of case law in the context of employment contracts in which a different approach has been taken. Again, Aikens LJ put it correctly in the remainder of para 89 as follows:
  "But in cases of contracts concerning work and services, where one party alleges that the written contract terms do not accurately reflect the true agreement of the parties, rectification principles are not in point, because it is not generally alleged that there was a mistake in setting out the contract terms as they were. There may be several reasons why the written terms do not accurately reflect what the parties actually agreed. But in each case the question the court has to answer is: what contractual terms did the parties actually agree?"
  [...]
33. At para 103 Sedley LJ said that he was entirely content to adopt the reasoning of Aikens LJ:
  "recognising as it does that while employment is a matter of contract, the factual matrix in which the contract is cast is not ordinarily the same as that of an arm's length commercial contract."
  I agree.
34. The critical difference between this type of case and the ordinary commercial dispute is identified by Aikens LJ in para 92 as follows:
  92. "I respectfully agree with the view, emphasised by both Smith and Sedley LJJ, that the circumstances in which contracts relating to work or services are concluded are often very different from those in which commercial contracts between parties of equal bargaining power are agreed. I accept that, frequently, organisations which are offering work or requiring services to be provided by individuals are in a position to dictate the written terms which the other party has to accept. In practice, in this area of the law, it may be more common for a court or tribunal to have to investigate allegations that the written contract does not represent the actual terms agreed and the court or tribunal must be realistic and worldly wise when it does so. ..."
35. So the relative bargaining power of the parties must be taken into account in deciding whether the terms of any written agreement in truth represent what was agreed and the true agreement will often have to be gleaned from all the circumstances of the case, of which the written agreement is only a part. This may be described as a purposive approach to the problem. If so, I am content with that description.

The facts

36. With characteristic clarity and brevity Sedley LJ described the factual position as follows:
  104. "Employment judges have a good knowledge of the world of work and a sense, derived from experience, of what is real there and what is window-dressing. The conclusion that Autoclenz's valeters were employees in all but name was a perfectly tenable one on the evidence which the judge had before him. The elaborate protestations in the contractual documents that the men were self-employed were odd in themselves and, when examined, bore no practical relation to the reality of the relationship.
  105. The contracts began by spelling out that each worker was required to 'perform the services which he agrees to carry out for Autoclenz within a reasonable time and in a good and workmanlike manner' - an obligation entirely consistent with employment. Notwithstanding the repeated interpolation of the word 'sub-contractor' and the introduction of terms inconsistent with employment which, as the judge found, were unreal, there was ample evidence on which the judge could find, as he did, that this was in truth an employment relationship.
  106. His finding did not seek to recast the contracts: it was a finding on the prior question of what the contracts were. Rightly, it was uninfluenced by the fiscal and other consequences of the relationship, which were by no means all one way."
37. I entirely agree with those conclusions. They are in my opinion justified by the critical findings of fact in paras 35 to 38 of the judgment of Employment Judge Foxwell in the ET. They were these:
  35. "In my judgment these claimants are employees. I do not think it can be said that Mr Huntington and his colleagues are businessmen in business on their own account. They have no control over the way in which they do their work. They have no real control over the hours that they work, save and except that they can leave when their share of the work on site has been completed. They do not have any real economic interest in the way in which the work is organised, other than the fact that the more work they do the more they earn. They cannot source materials for themselves. They are subject to the direction and control of the respondent's employees on site. They work in teams and not as individuals. It crossed my mind that each team might constitute a partnership, but it has never been suggested that these claimants are partners running businesses together and, whilst the makeup of each team seems to be fairly static, they can be adjusted to meet the respondent's needs. The claimants have no say in the terms upon which they perform work, the contracts which are placed before them are devised entirely by the respondent and the services they provide are subject to a detailed specification. The invoices which they submit are prepared by the respondent. The respondent determines the deductions which are applied to those invoices and the amounts charged in respect of insurance and materials. There has been no evidence to confirm that these deductions bear any real relation to the actual cost of the services to which they refer. Rates of pay are determined by the respondent and the respondent has felt able to increase or reduce those rates unilaterally. Really there is nothing that these claimants can do to make their putative businesses any more profitable by the way in which they organise themselves.
  36. I have noted that the claimants are required to wear company overalls and some of these are supplied free. I have also noted that they are provided with some training by the respondent. I do not think that either of these factors is determinative in this case. I accept that training must be provided to people who handle chemicals whatever their status for the purposes of health and safety. Equally I accept that requiring some badge of identification, in this case a uniform, is simply an incident of the fact that valeters are permitted to drive high value goods, motorcars and vans. That said, I accept the claimants' evidence that they are fully integrated into the respondent's business and that they have no real other source of work. I accept that occasionally individual claimants might work elsewhere but only on days when the respondent has no work for them to do. In Mr Huntington's case, for example, this occurred once in 17 years of service.
  37. I am satisfied that the claimants are required to provide personal service under their agreements with the respondent notwithstanding the substitution clause that was introduced in 2007. I do not find that this clause reflects what was actually agreed between the parties, which was that the claimants would show up each day to do work and that the respondent would offer work provided that it was there for them to do. Mr Hassell confirmed in evidence that this was the true nature of the agreement between the parties and that his work could not have been done without an understanding that the valeters could be relied on to turn up and do the work put in front of them. I have of course noted that in 2007 the respondent introduced a clause saying that there was no obligation on it to offer work or on the claimants to accept work. I find that this clause was wholly inconsistent with the practice described in paragraph 18 of Mr Hassell's witness statement where he refers to a requirement for valeters to notify him in advance if they were unavailable for work. This indicates that there was an obligation to attend for work unless a prior arrangement had been made. In my judgment these factors place these new clauses within the proposition identified at paragraph 58 in the judgment [of Elias J] in Consistent Group Ltd v Kalwak (supra) and I find that the substitution clause and the right to refuse work were unrealistic possibilities that were not truly in the contemplation of the parties when they entered into their agreements.
  38. Accordingly, I find that the claimants entered into contracts under which they provided personal service, where there were mutual obligations, namely the provision of work in return for money, that these obligations placed the contracts within the employment field and that the degree of control exercised by the respondent in the way that those contracts were performed placed them in the category of contracts of employment."
  Mr Hassell was the Autoclenz manager at the Measham site.
38. These are findings of fact which Autoclenz cannot sensibly challenge in this Court. In short, they are findings which were open to the ET. It is true that, as Smith and Aikens LJJ both observed, the reasoning of the ET could have been fuller, but I also agree with them (and Sedley LJ) that the ET was entitled to hold that the documents did not reflect the true agreement between the parties and that, on the basis of the ET's findings, four essential contractual terms were agreed: (1) that the valeters would perform the services defined in the contract for Autoclenz within a reasonable time and in a good and workmanlike manner; (2) that the valeters would be paid for that work; (3) that the valeters were obliged to carry out the work offered to them and Autoclenz undertook to offer work; and (4) that the valeters must personally do the work and could not provide a substitute to do so. See in particular, per Aikens LJ at para 97. It follows that, applying the principles identified above, the Court of Appeal was correct to hold that those were the true terms of the contract and that the ET was entitled to disregard the terms of the written documents, in so far as they were inconsistent with them.

== See also ==
- Employment contract in English law
- United Kingdom labour law
- European labour law – including retained regulations following Brexit
- United States labor law
- German labour law
- Uber BV v Aslam (2016)
