= List of judgments of the Supreme Court of the United Kingdom delivered in 2010 =

This is a list of the judgments given by the Supreme Court of the United Kingdom in 2010 and statistics associated thereupon. Since the Supreme Court began its work on 1 October 2009, this year was its first full year of operation. In total, 58 cases were heard in 2010.

The table lists judgments made by the court and the opinions of the judges in each case. Judges are treated as having concurred in another's judgment when they either formally attach themselves to the judgment of another or speak only to acknowledge their concurrence with one or more judges. Any judgment which reaches a conclusion which differs from the majority on one or more major points of the appeal has been treated as dissent.

Because every judge in the court is entitled to hand down a judgment, it is not uncommon for 'factions' to be formed who reach the same conclusion in different ways, or for all members of the court to reach the same conclusion in different ways. The table does not reflect this.

== 2010 case summaries ==
Unless otherwise noted, cases were heard by a panel of 5 judges.

Cases involving Scots law are highlighted in orange. Cases involving Northern Irish law are highlighted in green.

Case name	Citation	Date	Legal subject	Summary of decision
Re. Guardian News Media, in HM Treasury v Ahmed	[2010] UKSC 1	27 January	Article 8, ECHR; Article 10, ECHR	
HM Treasury v Ahmed	[2010] UKSC 2	27 January	Terrorism; Asset freezing	
Office of Communications v The Information Commissioner	[2010] UKSC 3	27 January	Freedom of information	
Grays Timber Products Ltd v HM Revenue & Customs	[2010] UKSC 4	3 February	Tax law	
HM Treasury v Ahmed (No 2)	[2010] UKSC 5	4 February	Asset freezing	
Allison v HM Advocate	[2010] UKSC 6	10 February	Criminal law of Scotland	
McInnes v HM Advocate	[2010] UKSC 7	10 February	Criminal law of Scotland	
Tomlinson v Birmingham CC	[2010] UKSC 8	17 February	Homelessness in England	
Norris v USA	[2010] UKSC 9	24 February	Extradition; Article 8, ECHR	
Martin v HM Advocate	[2010] UKSC 10	3 March	Scottish Devolution	
R (Lewis) v Redcar & Cleveland BC	[2010] UKSC 11	3 March	Town Greens	
Re W (Children)	[2010] UKSC 12	3 March	Family law	
Agbaje v Akinnoye-Agbaje	[2010] UKSC 13	10 March	Family law	
RTS Flexible Systems Ltd v Molkerei Alois Müller GmbH	[2010] UKSC 14	10 March	Contract law	
R (JS (Sri Lanka)) v Home Secretary	[2010] UKSC 15	17 March	Terrorism; immigration	
British Airways v Williams	[2010] UKSC 16	24 March	Labour law	
R (F) v Home Secretary	[2010] UKSC 17	21 April	Sexual Offences Act 2003; Article 8, ECHR	
Farstad Supply v Enviroco	[2010] UKSC 18	5 May	Negligence	
Inveresk plc v Tullis Russell Papermakers	[2010] UKSC 19	5 May	Scots contract law	
R (Sainsbury's Supermarkets Ltd) v Wolverhampton CC	[2010] UKSC 20	12 May	Planning law	
ZN (Afghanistan) v Entry Clearance Officer	[2010] UKSC 21	12 May	Immigration law	
Roberts v Gill & Co	[2010] UKSC 22	19 May	Wills	
OB v Aventis Pasteur SA	[2010] UKSC 23	26 May	Limitation periods	
Home Secretary v AP	[2010] UKSC 24	16 June	Control orders; Article 8, ECHR	
MS (Palestinian Territories) v Home Secretary	[2010] UKSC 25	16 June	Immigration law	
Home Secretary v AP (No 2)	[2010] UKSC 26	23 June	Article 8, ECHR	
JR17 (Judicial Review App.)	[2010] UKSC 27	23 June	Right to education	
Austin v Southwark LBC	[2010] UKSC 28	23 June	Landlord-tenant law	
R(Smith) v Defence Secretary	[2010] UKSC 29	30 June	Article 2, ECHR; Jurisdictional law	
R (Noone) v Drale Hall Prison	[2010] UKSC 30	30 June	Sentencing	
HJ (Iran) and HT (Cameroon) v Home Secretary	[2010] UKSC 31	7 July	Immigration law	
Southern Pacific Loans v Walker	[2010] UKSC 32	7 July	Consumer Credit Act 1974	
A v Essex CC	[2010] UKSC 33	14 July	Right to education	
O'Brien v Ministry of Justice	[2010] UKSC 34	28 July	Discrimination law	
Bocardo SA v Star Energy UK	[2010] UKSC 35	28 July	Trespass	
R (ZO (Somalia)) v Home Secretary	[2010] UKSC 36	28 July	Immigration law	
Morrison Sports v Scottish Power	[2010] UKSC 37	28 July	Electricity Act 1989	
RTS Flexible Systems Ltd v Molkerei Alois Müller GmbH (No 2)	[2010] UKSC 38	21 July	Contract law	
R v Rollins	[2010] UKSC 39	28 July	Criminal law; Money laundering	
R (Electoral Commission) v Westminster Magistrates' Court	[2010] UKSC 40	29 July	Political Parties, Elections and Referendums Act 2000	
Gisda Cyf v Barratt	[2010] UKSC 41	13 October	Labour law	
Radmacher v Granatino	[2010] UKSC 42	20 October	Prenuptial agreements	
Cadder v HM Advocate	[2010] UKSC 43	26 October	Criminal Procedure, Article 6 ECHR	
Oceanbulk Shipping & Trading v TMT Asia	[2010] UKSC 44	27 October	Contract law	
Manchester CC v Pinnock	[2010] UKSC 45	3 November	Housing, Article 8 ECHR	
Dallah Real Estate & Tourism v Pakistan	[2010] UKSC 46	3 November	Arbitration, ICC	
Multi-Link Leisure v North Lanarkshire Council	[2010] UKSC 47	17 November	Tenancy agreements	
R v Maxwell	[2010] UKSC 48	17 November	Retrial	
MA (Somalia) v Home Secretary	[2010] UKSC 49	24 November	Immigration law, Article 3 ECHR	
RBS v Wilson	[2010] UKSC 50	24 November	Securities, Property law	
Customs v Holland	[2010] UKSC 51	24 November	Company law, Insolvency	
R v Chaytor	[2010] UKSC 52	1 December	Parliamentary privilege, Parliamentary expenses	
Spiller v Joseph	[2010] UKSC 53	1 December	Defamation, Fair comment	
R (Child Poverty Action Group) v Secretary of State for Work and Pensions	[2010] UKSC 54	8 December	Housing benefit	
Progress Property v Moorgarth Group	[2010] UKSC 55	8 December	Company law	
Principal Reporter v K	[2010] UKSC 56	15 December	Family law; Article 8, ECHR	
R (Edwards) v Environment Agency	[2010] UKSC 57	15 December	Costs	
HM Revenue and Customs v DCC Holdings	[2010] UKSC 58	15 December	Tax law	

== 2010 judgments ==
Delivered a judgment (majority)	Concurred in the judgment of another justice (majority)	Delivered a judgment (dissenting)	Concurred in the judgment of another justice (dissent)	Did not participate in the decision

Case name	Citation	Argued	Decided	Phillips of Worth Matravers	Hope of Craighead	Saville of Newdigate	Rodger of Earlsferry	Walker of Gestingthorpe	Hale of Richmond	Brown of Eaton-under-Heywood	Mance	Collins of Mapesbury	Kerr of Tonaghmore	Clarke of Stone-cum-Ebony	Dyson
HM Treasury v Al-Ghabra	[2010] UKSC 1	5 and 22 October 2009	27 January
HM Treasury v Ahmed	[2010] UKSC 2	5–8 October 2009	27 January
Office of Communications v The Information Commissioner	[2010] UKSC 3	17 November 2009	27 January
Grays Timber Products Ltd v HM Revenue & Customs	[2010] UKSC 4	14–15 December 2009	3 February
HM Treasury v Ahmed (No.2)	[2010] UKSC 5	28 January	4 February
Allison v HM Advocate	[2010] UKSC 6	8 December 2009	10 February
McInnes v HM Advocate	[2010] UKSC 7	8–9 December 2009	10 February
Tomlinson v Birmingham CC	[2010] UKSC 8	23–24 November 2009	17 February
Norris v USA	[2010] UKSC 9	30 November – 1 December 2009	24 February
Martin v HM Advocate	[2010] UKSC 10	8–10 December 2009	3 March
R (Lewis) v Redcar & Cleveland BC	[2010] UKSC 11	18–20 January	3 March
Re W (Children)	[2010] UKSC 12	1–2 March	3 March
Agbaje v Akinnoye-Agbaje	[2010] UKSC 13	3–4 November 2009	10 March
RTS Flexible Systems Limited v Molkerei Alois Müller GmbH	[2010] UKSC 14	2–3 November 2009	10 March
R (JS (Sri Lanka)) v Home Secretary	[2010] UKSC 15	13–14 January	17 March
British Airways v Williams	[2010] UKSC 16	24–25 February	24 March
R (F) v Home Secretary	[2010] UKSC 17	3–4 February	21 April
Farstad Supply v Enviroco	[2010] UKSC 18	9–10 March	5 May
Inveresk plc v Tullis Russell Papermakers	[2010] UKSC 19	1–2 March	5 May
R (Sainsbury's Supermarkets Ltd) v Wolverhampton CC	[2010] UKSC 20	1–2 February	12 May
ZN (Afghanistan) v Entry Clearance Officer	[2010] UKSC 21	15 February	12 May
Roberts v Gill & Co	[2010] UKSC 22	22–23 February	19 May
OB v Aventis Pasteur SA	[2010] UKSC 23	15 April	26 May
Home Secretary v AP	[2010] UKSC 24	5 May	16 June
MS (Palestinian Territories) v Home Secretary	[2010] UKSC 25	26–27 April	16 June
Home Secretary v AP	[2010] UKSC 26	5 May	23 June
JR17 (Judicial Review App.)	[2010] UKSC 27	19–20 April	23 June
Austin v Southwark LBC	[2010] UKSC 28	21–22 April	23 June
R(Smith) v Defence Secretary	[2010] UKSC 29	15–17 March	30 June
R (Noone) v Drake Hall Prison	[2010] UKSC 30	11–12 May	30 June
HJ (Iran) and HT (Cameroon) v Home Secretary	[2010] UKSC 31	10–12 May	7 July
Southern Pacific Loans v Walker	[2010] UKSC 32	13 May	7 July
A v Essex CC	[2010] UKSC 33	24–25 March	14 July
O'Brien v MOJ	[2010] UKSC 34	14–15 June	28 July
Star Energy Weald Basin Ltd v Bocardo SA	[2010] UKSC 35	22–24 June	28 July
R (ZO (Somalia)) v Home Secretary	[2010] UKSC 36	17–18 May	28 July
Morrison Sports v Scottish Power	[2010] UKSC 37	16 June	28 July
RTS Flexible Systems Ltd v Molkerei Alois Müller GmbH (No. 2)	[2010] UKSC 38	2–3 December 2009	21 July
R v Rollins	[2010] UKSC 39	12–13 July	28 July
R (Electoral Commission) v Westminster Magistrates' Court	[2010] UKSC 40	8–9 June	29 July
Gisda Cyf v Barratt	[2010] UKSC 41	19 July	13 October
Radmacher v Granatino	[2010] UKSC 42	22–23 March	20 October
Cadder v HM Advocate	[2010] UKSC 43	24–26 May	26 October
Oceanbulk Shipping & Trading v TMT Asia	[2010] UKSC 44	14–15 July	27 October
Manchester CC v Pinnock	[2010] UKSC 45	5–8 July	3 November
Dallah Real Estate & Tourism v Pakistan	[2010] UKSC 46	28–30 June	3 November
Multi-Link Leisure v North Lanarkshire Council	[2010] UKSC 47	12 October	17 November
R v Maxwell	[2010] UKSC 48	19–20 July	17 November
MA (Somalia) v Home Secretary	[2010] UKSC 49	11 October	24 November
RBS v Wilson	[2010] UKSC 50	13–14 October	24 November
Holland v Revenue and Customs Commissioners	[2010] UKSC 51	21–22 July	24 November
R v Chaytor	[2010] UKSC 52	18–19 October	1 December
Spiller v Joseph	[2010] UKSC 53	26–27 July	1 December
R (Child Poverty Action Group) v Secretary of State for Work and Pensions	[2010] UKSC 54	25 October	8 December
Progress Property v Moorgarth Group	[2010] UKSC 55	5 October	8 December
Principal Reporter v K	[2010] UKSC 56	20–21 October	15 December
R (Edwards) v Environment Agency	[2010] UKSC 57	11 November	15 December
HM Revenue and Customs v DCC Holdings (UK) Ltd	[2010] UKSC 58	2–4 November	15 December
