= Gisda Cyf v Barratt =

UK labour law case

- Court: Supreme Court of the United Kingdom
- Full case name: Gisda Cyf v Barratt
- Argued: 19 July 2010
- Decided: 13 October 2010
- Neutral citation: [2010] UKSC 41
- Reported at: [2010] 4 All ER 851

Case history
- Prior history: [2009] EWCA Civ 648 and [2008] UKEAT 0173_08_2407

Holding
- Confirmed the principle that a notice of summary dismissal takes effect either when it is read, or when the recipient has had a 'reasonable opportunity' to read it.

Case opinions
- Majority: Lord Kerr (Lords Hope, Saville, Walker and Lady Hale concurring)

Area of law
- Employment, Unfair dismissal

Gisda Cyf v Barratt [2010] UKSC 41 is a UK labour law case, concerning unfair dismissal governed by the Employment Rights Act 1996.

== Facts ==
Gisda Cyf employed Ms Barratt. On 30 November 2006 a letter was sent to her that she was being summarily dismissed for gross misconduct, apparently misconduct at a private party, ‘witnessed by one of the company’s service users’. She had been given a disciplinary hearing, and then told she would hear by post. Ms Barratt was visiting her sister who was giving birth, and did not open the letter until 4 December. She appealed through the charity's internal procedure, and that was dismissed. Then she filed an unfair dismissal claim for sex discrimination on 2 March 2007.

Bean J in the Employment Appeal Tribunal held it was within time, because the principle in The Brimnes could not be adapted to the employment law context. Mummery LJ in the Court of Appeal agreed.

== Judgment ==
Lord Kerr for the Supreme Court (Lord Hope, Lord Saville, Lord Walker and Lady Hale) held that because the Employment Rights Act 1996 section 97 is part of an employees’ charter of rights, about which people must be properly informed, that the employer's communication of dismissal was ineffective until Miss Barratt was actually told. Starting by reference to the judgments of the courts below, Lord Kerr said the following.

34. Underlying both decisions (although not expressly articulated in either) is the notion that it would be unfair for time to begin to run against an employee in relation to his or her unfair dismissal complaint until the employee knows – or, at least, has a reasonable chance to find out – that he or she has been dismissed. This is as it should be. Dismissal from employment is a major event in anyone's life. Decisions that may have a profound effect on one's future require to be made. It is entirely reasonable that the time (already short) within which one should have the chance to make those decisions should not be further abbreviated by complications surrounding the receipt of the information that one has in fact been dismissed.

35. These considerations provide the essential rationale for not following the conventional contract law route in the approach to an interpretation of section 97. As Mummery LJ said, it is a statutory construct. It is designed to hold the balance between employer and employee but it does not require – nor should it – that both sides be placed on an equal footing. Employees as a class are in a more vulnerable position than employers. Protection of employees' rights has been the theme of legislation in this field for many years. The need for the protection and safeguarding of employees' rights provides the overarching backdrop to the proper construction of section 97.

36. An essential part of the protection of employees is the requirement that they be informed of any possible breach of their rights. For that reason we emphatically agree with the EAT's view in McMaster that the doctrine of constructive knowledge has no place in the debate as to whether a dismissal has been communicated. For the short time of three months to begin to run against an employee, he or she must be informed of the event that triggers the start of that period, namely, their dismissal or, at least, he or she must have the chance to find out that that short period has begun. Again, this case exemplifies the need for this. During the three months after Ms Barratt's dismissal, she pursued an internal appeal; she learned that she was unsuccessful in that appeal; she sought advice in relation to the lodging of a complaint of unfair dismissal; and she presumably required some time to absorb and act upon that advice. Viewed in the abstract, three months might appear to be a substantial period. In reality, however, when momentous decisions have to be taken, it is not an unduly generous time.

37. We do not consider, therefore, that what has been described as the "general law of contract" should provide a preliminary guide to the proper interpretation of section 97 of the 1996 Act, much less that it should be determinative of that issue. With the proposition that one should be aware of what conventional contractual principles would dictate we have no quarrel but we tend to doubt that the "contractual analysis" should be regarded as a starting point in the debate, certainly if by that it is meant that this analysis should hold sway unless displaced by other factors. Section 97 should be interpreted in its setting. It is part of a charter protecting employees' rights. An interpretation that promotes those rights, as opposed to one which is consonant with traditional contract law principles, is to be preferred.

38. For these reasons we reject the thesis that cases such as London Transport Executive v Clarke, Kirklees Metropolitan Council v Radecki, Potter v RJ Temple plc and George v Luton Borough Council represent a general acceptance that statutory rights given to employees should be interpreted in a way that is compatible with common law contractual principles, if indeed they are as they have been represented to be. (On this latter point, we have not received contrary argument on the common law position and we wish to make clear that this judgment should not be taken as an endorsement of the appellant's argument as to the effect of those principles). Of course, where the protection of employees' statutory rights exactly coincides with common law principles, the latter may well provide an insight into how the former may be interpreted and applied but that is a far cry from saying that principles of contract law should dictate the scope of employees' statutory rights. These cases do no more, in our opinion, than recognise that where common law principles precisely reflect the statutorily protected rights of employees they may be prayed in aid to reinforce the protection of those rights.

39. The need to segregate intellectually common law principles relating to contract law, even in the field of employment, from statutorily conferred rights is fundamental. The common law recognised certain employment rights, but the right at common law not to be wrongfully dismissed is significantly narrower than the statutory protection against unfair dismissal. The deliberate expansion by Parliament of the protection of employment rights for employees considered to be vulnerable and the significance of the creation of a separate system of rights was recognised by the House of Lords in Johnson v Unisys Ltd [2001] UKHL 13, [2003] 1 AC 518. In that case the employee had succeeded in an unfair dismissal claim but, because of the statutory cap on compensation, sought to bring a claim at common law for breach of an implied term of trust and confidence during the dismissal process. The House of Lords refused to permit the supplanting of the legislative scheme by entertaining a second claim at common law. The leading judgment of Lord Hoffmann recognised the deliberate move by Parliament away from the ordinary law of contract as governing employer/employee contractual relations. At para 35 of his opinion Lord Hoffmann said: -

"… At common law the contract of employment was regarded by the courts as a contract like any other. The parties were free to negotiate whatever terms they liked and no terms would be implied unless they satisfied the strict test of necessity applied to a commercial contract. Freedom of contract meant that the stronger party, usually the employer, was free to impose his terms upon the weaker. But over the last 30 years or so, the nature of the contract of employment has been transformed. It has been recognised that a person's employment is usually one of the most important things in his or her life. It gives not only a livelihood but an occupation, an identity and a sense of self-esteem. The law has changed to recognise this social reality. Most of the changes have been made by Parliament. The Employment Rights Act 1996 consolidates numerous statutes which have conferred rights upon employees …"

40. In an earlier case, essentially the same message was delivered. In Redbridge London Borough Council v Fishman [1978] ICR 569, EAT, at 574 Phillips J described the difference between the contractual cause of action of wrongful dismissal and the statutory regime of unfair dismissal thus:

"The jurisdiction based on paragraph 6 (8) of Schedule 1 to the Trade Union and Labour Relations Act 1974 has not got much to do with contractual rights and duties. Many dismissals are unfair although the employer is contractually entitled to dismiss the employee. Contrariwise, some dismissals are not unfair although the employer was not contractually entitled to dismiss the employee. Although the contractual rights and duties are not irrelevant to the question posed by paragraph 6(8), they are not of the first importance."

40. The essential underpinning of the appellant's case, that conventional principles of contract law should come into play in the interpretation of section 97, must therefore be rejected. The construction and application of that provision must be guided principally by the underlying purpose of the statute viz the protection of the employee's rights. Viewed through that particular prism, it is not difficult to conclude that the well established rule that an employee is entitled either to be informed or at least to have the reasonable chance of finding out that he has been dismissed before time begins to run against him is firmly anchored to the overall objective of the legislation.

41. The fact that this rule has survived, indeed has been tacitly approved by, successive enactments merely reinforces the conclusion that it is consonant with the purpose of the various provisions relating to time limits. As Mummery LJ so pithily and appositely put it, the legislation is designed to allow an employee three months – not three months less a day or two – to make a complaint of unfair dismissal. When one considers that the decision to lodge such a complaint is one not to be taken lightly, it is entirely to be expected that the period should run from the time that the need to make such a decision is known to the employee.

42. There is no reason to suppose that the rule in its present form will provoke uncertainty as to its application nor is there evidence that this has been the position hitherto. The inquiry as to whether an employee read a letter of dismissal within the three months prior to making the complaint or as to the reasons for failing to do so should in most cases be capable of being contained within a short compass. It should not, as a matter of generality, occupy a significantly greater time than that required to investigate the time of posting a letter and when it was delivered. In any event, certainty, although desirable, is by no means the only factor to be considered in determining the proper interpretation to be given to section 97. What will most strongly influence that decision is the question of which construction most conduces to the fulfillment of the legislative purpose. And, of course, an employer who wishes to be certain that his employee is aware of the dismissal can resort to the prosaic expedient of informing the employee in a face-to-face interview that he or she has been dismissed.

43. On that issue, it appears to us that the matter is put beyond plausible debate when one considers the effect that the appellant's suggested interpretation of section 97 would have on the availability of the relief provided for in section 128 of the 1996 Act. An application for interim relief may well prove in certain cases to be an immensely important facility. In the case of a whistle blower, for instance, the opportunity to forestall a recriminatory dismissal or one designed to frustrate the intentions of the conscientious employee may be of vital consequence. But this right would be severely attenuated, and in many cases wholly eliminated, if the appellant's interpretation of section 97 is accepted.

44. Sensibly recognising the significance of this point, Mr Greatorex sought to minimise its importance by pointing out that applications for interim relief are made in a very small percentage of cases.

45. But, as we have indicated, the true importance of this remedy lies not in the number of cases in which it might be invoked but in the nature of the few cases where it may be crucial. No dispensing provision is available to extend the period within which an application for interim relief might be made. It is therefore, in our view, inconceivable that Parliament would have intended that section 97 should be interpreted to mean that seven days only would be available for the making of such an application, regardless of whether the applicant was aware of the dismissal within that period. Yet that is the inevitable consequence of interpreting section 97 in the manner that the appellants suggest. Of all the reasons that this interpretation cannot be right, this is perhaps the most strikingly obvious.

Conclusion

46. The appeal must be dismissed.

== See also ==
- 2010 Judgments of the Supreme Court of the United Kingdom
- UK labour law
