= Heads of terms =

Document outlining the issues relevant to a legal agreement

A set of heads of terms or heads of agreement, or a letter of intent, is a non-binding document outlining the main issues relevant to a tentative sale, partnership, or other agreement.

A heads of agreement document will only be enforceable when it is adopted into a parent contract and is subsequently agreed upon, unless otherwise stated. Until that point, a heads of agreement will not be legally binding. However, such documents can become legally binding if the agreement document contains terms or language which explicitly indicates an intention to be legally bound. Equally, a letter which contains no expression of whether its terms were intended to be binding can be found to be binding due to language used. This is also dependent on the circumstances of the transaction and includes the conduct of the parties themselves.

A key function of heads of terms is to assist in the identification of critical issues as early as possible during negotiations which could stop a transaction going ahead.

== Commercial property transaction ==
In a commercial property transaction in the UK, a heads of agreement is often known as the heads of terms (HOTS). The main purpose of the heads of terms is to identify and highlight the requirements of both the seller and the purchaser of the property. There are a number of advantages of using the heads of terms. For instance, by carrying this out, both parties will fully understand what they are subject to, and can reduce or abolish any misunderstandings from either party. The heads of terms normally contains the following information:

- Details of the property seller
- Details of the property purchaser
- Address of the commercial property
- Details of the commercial property
- The purchase price both parties have agreed to
- The payment information
- Any special conditions
- Transaction completion date

An agreement made in writing, signed by all parties, including the terms expressly agreed by the parties and evidencing offer, acceptance, consideration and intention to create legal relations is likely to be treated as a binding contract because such contents reflect the requirements of the Law of Property (Miscellaneous Provisions) Act 1989, which states (in section 2) that "a contract for the sale or other disposition of an interest in land can only be made in writing and only by incorporating all the terms which the parties have expressly agreed in one document or, where contracts are exchanged, in each".

== See also ==
- Fletcher Challenge Energy Ltd v Electricity Corp of New Zealand Ltd [2002] 2 NZLR 433
- RTS Flexible Systems Ltd v Molkerei Alois Müller GmbH & Co KG [2008]
- Letter of intent
- Memorandum of understanding
- Term sheet
