= Incorporated Council of Law Reporting =

British registered charity and publisher

The Incorporated Council of Law Reporting for England & Wales
- Type: Charity/not-for-profit
- Industry: Law reporting and publishing
- Founded: London, England; February 1865
- Founder: W. T. S. Daniel Q.C.
- Headquarters: London, England
- Area served: England and Wales
- Key people: Richard Fleck CBE (Chairman); T. H. W. Piper Esq. (Vice-chairman); Andy Redman (CEO); Giovanni D'Avola (Editor)
- Products: ICLR Online; The Law Reports; Weekly Law Reports; Industrial Cases Reports; The Business Law Reports; The Public and Third Sector Law Reports
- Services: Editorial services; Legal Publishing
- Number of employees: 60
- Website: iclr.co.uk

The Incorporated Council of Law Reporting for England and Wales (ICLR) is a registered charity based in London, England, that publishes law reports of English law. The company is widely recognised as a reputable producer of reports (and the only 'official' source), which are used by students, academics, journalists, lawyers and judges across the country.

== History ==
The ICLR was founded in 1865 by W. T. S. Daniel QC, and its first meeting took place on 25 February at Westminster Hall, then the home of the Court of King's Bench, the Court of Common Pleas and the Court of Chancery. The council was incorporated under the Companies Act 1862 in 1870.

Largely working "as a private enterprise without state aid or interference", the council "was not intended to be profit making except in so far as it was necessary to make it self-supporting." Working on this principle, the council applied in 1966 for registration to become an official charity under section 4 of the Charities Act 1960 (8 & 9 Eliz. 2. c. 58). Upon rejection by the Charity Commission the council appealed under section 5(3) of the 1960 act, an action granted by Mr Justice Foster in the Chancery Division of the High Court. On appeal by the Inland Revenue to the Court of Appeal, who were joint defendants with the Attorney General, it was held that "the Council was established for exclusively charitable purposes since its purpose was to further the development and administration of the law and to make it known or accessible to all members of the community, which was a purpose beneficial to the community and of general public utility." In 1970, then, the ICLR was successfully registered as a charity in England and Wales.

Currently chaired by Richard Fleck CBE, the ICLR's council consists of members nominated by each of the Inns of Court and by the General Council of the Bar, and is based in 119 Megary House, Chancery Lane, London.

== Objectives and procedures ==
According to the company's memorandum of association, the ICLR was established with the following principal aim:

The preparation and publication, in a convenient form, at a moderate price, and under gratuitous professional control, of [The Law] Reports of Judicial Decisions of the Superior and Appellate Courts in England and Wales.

The ICLR also has a set of criteria for law reporting, originally proposed by Nathaniel Lindley (who later became Master of the Rolls and subsequently a Lord of Appeal), which said that care should be taken to exclude from the reports those cases that passed without discussion and were valueless as precedents, and those that were substantially repetitions of earlier reports to which was added the following list of valuable (and thus worthy of reporting) categories:

- All cases which introduce, or appear to introduce, a new principle or a new rule.
- All cases which materially modify an existing principle or rule.
- All cases which settle, or materially tend to settle, a question upon which the law is doubtful.
- All cases which for any reason are peculiarly instructive.

== Publications ==
The primary series of reports published by the ICLR is The Law Reports, which the council describes as "the most authoritative reports' and states should 'always be cited in preference where there is a choice." This series is divided into four main sub-series:

- Law Reports, Appeal Cases (AC), covering decisions of the House of Lords (and, since 2009, the Supreme Court), the Privy Council and the Court of Appeal – started in 1866 as the Law Reports, English & Irish Appeals, renamed in 1875 and redesigned in 1891;
- Law Reports, Chancery Division (Ch), covering decisions of the Chancery Division of the High Court – started in 1865 as the Law Reports, Chancery Appeal Cases, renamed in 1875 and redesigned in 1890;
- Law Reports, Family Division (Fam), covering decisions of the Family Division of the High Court – started in 1865 as the Law Reports, Probate & Divorce Cases, renamed Law Reports, Probate, Divorce & Admiralty Division in 1875, renamed Law Reports, Probate in 1891 and renamed in 1972; and
- Law Reports, Queen's Bench (QB), covering decision of the Queen's Bench Division of the High Court – started in 1865, renamed Law Reports, Queen's Bench Division in 1875, renamed in 1891, renamed Law Reports, King's Bench in 1901 and renamed in 1952.

Additional reports published by the ICLR include The Weekly Law Reports (W.L.R.), started in 1953 and covering what the ICLR describe as "the cases that really matter, which either develop the law in some way or introduce a new point of law"; the Industrial Cases Reports (I.C.R.), started in 1975 and covering cases of employment law heard in the House of Lords, the Court of Appeal, the High Court, the Employment Appeal Tribunal and the European Court of Justice, as well as "cases of special interest" from the Privy Council, the Court of Session and employment tribunals; The Business Law Reports (Bus. L.R.), started in 2007 and covering company, commercial and intellectual property law; and The Public and Third Sector Law Reports (P.T.S.R.), started in 2009 and covering issues such as adoption, charity, ecclesiastical law, education, environmental law, health law, housing, human rights, local government, public health law and social welfare.

It also published annual volumes of U.K. legislation from 1866 to 2010.

Most of its reports were available electronically on Westlaw and LexisNexis until the beginning of 2017, when the ICLR instead published its reports exclusively on its platform.
