= Luke v Stoke-on-Trent City Council =

Luke v Stoke City Council
- Court: Court of Appeal of England and Wales
- Decided: 24 July 2007
- Citation: [2007] EWCA Civ 761

Court membership
- Judges sitting: Mummery LJ, Laws LJ and Moses LJ

Keywords
- Implied terms, wage deductions

Luke v Stoke-on-Trent City Council [2007] EWCA Civ 761 is a UK labour law case, concerning the test for an implied term.

== Facts ==
Mrs Beryl Luke was a special education teacher for Stoke. She had a dispute with the headmaster and went off sick from October 2002 to April 2003. She alleged bullying and harassment and the council commissioned an independent report on it, which rejected all but one allegation. She would not accept the conclusions. She refused their proposal that she be found equivalent hours elsewhere, because she wanted to return. The council stopped paying her in February 2004. She claimed unlawful deduction of wages.

The Employment Tribunal dismissed her claim, saying the council acted reasonably saying she could not return to work unless she accepted the report's conclusions. It was an implied term that she be required to work elsewhere. Employment Appeal Tribunal dismissed her appeal.

== Judgment ==
Mummery LJ, Laws LJ and Moses LJ also dismissed her appeal. In fact, it had not been necessary to imply any term. The express agreement could be construed as a whole in the context of surrounding circumstances whereby it was the claimant's duty to comply with the council's reasonable requirements as long as they were within the contract's scope. Nothing entitled her to set terms on which she could return to work or continue getting a salary for not teaching there. It was a reasonable requirement to return and accept the ‘action plan’ and therefore the council was not obliged to keep paying her.

== See also ==
- Mahmoud v BCCI SA
