= Bowater v Northwest London Hospitals NHS Trust =

- Court: Court of Appeal of England and Wales
- Decided: 1 February 2011
- Citation: [2011] EWCA Civ 63

Court membership
- Judge sitting: Martin Moore-Bick, Richard Aikens
- Chief judge: Lord Justice Moore-Bick

Keywords
- Unfair dismissal Gross misconduct

Bowater v Northwest London Hospitals NHS Trust [2011] EWCA Civ 63 is a UK labour law case, concerning unfair dismissal.

== Facts ==
Laura Bowater, the female attending nurse, while helping restrain a disoriented, naked, male patient, was in a straddle position as part of a standard restraint procedure. She then made a lewd remark, saying "It's been a few months since I have been in this position with a man underneath me". The NHS trust, her employer, claimed this was lewd and unprofessional and deserved dismissal for her gross misconduct. The Employment Tribunal said the dismissal was unfair after analysing the context of the situation.

== Defences and Responses ==
Bowater made the defence that she had an excellent disciplinary record and was considered in her standards a very competent nurse and that, albeit inappropriate, she admitted the comment was a light-hearted joke in a highly stressful situation. She furthermore claimed that the comment was not made to undermine nor offend anyone.

The Trust made the claim that Bowaters comment was lewd, inappropriate and a serious gross misconduct especially in the context of a vulnerable patient who is under the care of the hospital. Bowater was then dismissed on these grounds.

== Judgment ==
The Employment Tribunal found that Bowater's dismissal was unfair. The Tribunal had considered the context of the incident, regarding that the remark made by the nurse was intended as a misguided joke, no members of the public were present, and there was no evidence the patient was conscious of the comment. Following this ruling the Trust had appealed this decision at the Employment Appeal Tribunal, which reversed this decision, ruling the dismissal was fair. Bowater then appealed to the Court of Appeal, which restored the original Tribunal finding that the dismissal was unjust. The Court of Appeal held that the Tribunal had competently exercised its discretion in granting the unfair dismissal claim. The Tribunal had made the claim that meanwhile the comment was misguided, it was not malicious and said with any intent and as no members of the public were present and the patient was unconscious, this was an overreaction on the Trust's end.
