= Link Lending Ltd v Bustard =

- Court: Court of Appeal
- Full case name: Link Lending Limited v Ms Susan Bustard (by her litigation friend Peter Walker)
- Decided: 23 April 2010
- Citations: [2010] EWCA Civ 424 [2010] 2 EGLR 55 [2010] 18 EG 98 (CS) [2010] 28 EG 86
- Transcript: at bailii.org

Case history
- Prior action: Appellant lender also lost in the Administrative Court at the County Court before HHJ Walker
- Subsequent action: none

Court membership
- Judges sitting: Jacob LJ; Sullivan LJ; Mummery LJ

Case opinions
- "In this case the new and special feature is in the psychiatric problems of the person claiming actual occupation. The judge was, in my view, justified in ruling, at the conclusion of a careful and detailed judgment, that Ms Bustard was a person in actual occupation of the Property. His conclusion was supported by evidence of a sufficient degree of continuity and permanence of occupation, of involuntary residence elsewhere, which was satisfactorily explained by objective reasons, and of a persistent intention to return home when possible, as manifested by her regular visits to the Property." — Mummery LJ's judgement (for the whole panel on appeal)
- Decision by: Mummery LJ
- Concurrence: Jacob LJ; Sullivan LJ

Keywords
- Actual occupation; overriding interests (Land Registration Act 2002, Schedule 3); owner defrauded (from property); new secured lender; mental health hospitalisation; subprime mortgage crisis; mortgage fraud

Link Lending Ltd v Bustard [2010] EWCA Civ 424 is an English land law case, concerning actual occupation in registered land and the vulnerable, in this case a defrauded person suffering from a mental syndrome who would have had little concept of what was occurring.

The case decided that an intention to return home, from fraud-induced absence, of the rightful owner can count as "actual occupation" for the purposes of overriding interests which binds new owners and lenders in domestic properties. The defrauded owner was not absent at the time of the transfer of the home but was at most times for many months during a new replacement secured loan obtained by the fraudster.

The case turned on facts including that the defrauded owner's furniture and personal effects were still there; she made relatively brief, supervised visits about once a week to check out the property and collect post; but she was incapable of living safely in the property and at the relevant date the powers exercised under the terms of "sectioning" otherwise prevented her from leaving her mental health hospital.

The Court of Appeal confirmed the order of the High Court: that the transfer be reversed; Link Lending discharge their charge (lose their security as against this property); Mrs Hussain (the fraudster) and Link (her unwitting lender) [be obliged] to pay Ms Bustard's costs.

== Facts ==
Through fraud, Mrs Noreen Hussain took advantage of Ms Susan Bustard's mental handicap by having her transfer (by transfer deed) her the house, 12 Cradley Drive, Brookfield, Middlesbrough in 2004. Bustard was sectioned in 2007 and put in hospital. Hussain obtained on the 2004 date an interest-only mortgage loan (secured against the house) approved by HSBC. In 2008 the fraudster replaced her mortgage loan with one from Link Lending and then defaulted, and the lender claimed possession, arguing Bustard had not been there for over a year. Bustard argued that she was in actual occupation (under LRA 2002 Sch 3, para 2, a virtual re-enactment of the standing law, since 1925).

The Judge refused appeal which Carnwath LJ then granted on grounds that the case raised issues of general importance.

== Judgment ==
The panel concurred with Mummery LJ's judgment. He upheld the judge's decision in law and in fact. Bustard was "in actual occupation" because of her persistent intention to return home, evidenced by regular visits to the property.

14. In short, what mattered, in the view of the judge, was the combined manifestation of her occupation, her continuing intention to occupy and the reason that prevented her from living at home. The judge's approach was that whether someone is in actual occupation is a question of fact depending on all the circumstances.

[...]
25.The facts are not all one way. Some of the primary facts point against Ms Bustard's actual occupation of the property at the relevant date: she was not personally present in the Property on 29 February 2008; she had been in a residential care home since January 2007; she was incapable of living safely in the Property; and her visits to the Property were brief and supervised.
26.Some of the primary facts point to Ms Bustard's continuing actual occupation of the property: it was her furnished home and the only place to which she genuinely wanted to return; she continued to visit the property because she still considered it her home; those who had taken responsibility for her finances regularly paid the bills, such as the community charge, from her funds; she was in the process of making an application to the Mental Health Review Tribunal in order to be allowed to return home; and no-one took a final and irrevocable decision that she would not eventually be permitted to return home.
27.Whether Ms Bustard was in "actual occupation" of the property at the relevant date was an issue on which the trial judge had to make an evaluation based on his findings of primary fact. As for the law he considered the relevant authorities on the concept of a "person in actual occupation" of land in the earlier Land Registration legislation and now found in the 2002 Act. The construction of the earlier equivalent provisions by the House of Lords is binding on this court. The trend of the cases shows that the courts are reluctant to lay down, or even suggest, a single legal test for determining whether a person is in actual occupation. The decisions on statutory construction identify the factors that have to be weighed by the judge on this issue. The degree of permanence and continuity of presence of the person concerned, the intentions and wishes of that person, the length of absence from the property and the reason for it and the nature of the property and personal circumstances of the person are among the relevant factors.
28.This court can only interfere with the judge's decision on that issue if it is satisfied that, in the light of the law, it was wrong as a matter of statutory construction, or if it was wrong as a judgment of fact and degree. As for construction, the judge considered the relevant provisions and cited the relevant authorities as to what, in law, is capable of constituting actual occupation of property. As for his application of that law to the facts, the question for this court is whether the judge could properly and reasonably conclude that Ms Bustard was in actual occupation of the property at the relevant date.
29.In my judgment, this court should not disturb the decision that Ms Bustard was a person in actual occupation of the property. The judge did not misconstrue the 2002 Act or the authorities. Nor did he misapply the law by making an insupportable evaluation of Ms Bustard's situation regarding the property. The decisions of the courts on the different facts of other cases have been cited against his conclusion, but they do not demonstrate that he was wrong.
30. The assistance given in the authorities is in clarifying the legal principles, exploring the range of decisions available to the court and identifying the factors to which weight should be given. It is clear from the citations that Ms Bustard's is not a case of a "mere fleeting presence", or a case, like Cann, of acts preparatory to the assumption of actual occupation. It is also distinguishable from Stockholm, which involved the domestic living arrangements of a Saudi princess living with her mother in Saudi Arabia and owning a house in London, where there was furniture and clothing and caretaking arrangements in place, but where she had not lived for more than a year. In this case the new and special feature is in the psychiatric problems of the person claiming actual occupation. The judge was, in my view, justified in ruling, at the conclusion of a careful and detailed judgment, that Ms Bustard was a person in actual occupation of the Property. His conclusion was supported by evidence of a sufficient degree of continuity and permanence of occupation, of involuntary residence elsewhere, which was satisfactorily explained by objective reasons, and of a persistent intention to return home when possible, as manifested by her regular visits to the property.
31. Finally, I agree with the accurate and helpful summary of the authorities by Lewison J in Thompson v Foy. The judge did not mis-apply that summary of the law. His decision is supportable in law and in fact.

The court could, as in other cases, have taken into consideration further errors in the lender's decision to lend to the borrower, the fraudster against the previous owner. These errors included constructive notice of the fraud firmly fixed to the mortgage lender, particularly that under land registration, the headline details of the transaction by the proposed borrower showed their ownership was recent and the price of £100,000 was a slight undervalue.

== Commentary ==
The court did criticise the lender's valuation. "The only inspection of the property by Link prior to taking the charge on it was a "drive-by" inspection by a surveyor, who noted signs of occupation." The court suggests physical inspections (in lender's valuations) should take note of who may be deemed to be legally in occupation.

In contrast to other fraud cases as regards secured lending, the case did not consider other means for constructive notice of the fraud "to attach" to the mortgage lender, for example under land registration, the summary of the purchase of the proposed borrower showed her ownership was recent and supposedly at £100,000 (an undervalue). Furthermore, nothing was truly paid, a fact ascertainable on further investigation. Neither did the court consider other textbook errors in the two successive lenders' decisions to lend to the borrower who, without short of actual notice, was the fraudster against the previous, very vulnerable, registered owner. The Law Commission has called the statutory term 'actual occupation' "notorious and much-litigated". The term is not defined by statute.

The case upholds a "hybrid objective-subjective test, perhaps more suited to the modern world".

== Cases applied ==
- Thompson v Foy [2009] EWHC 1076

== Cases distinguished ==
- Stockholm Finance Ltd v Garden Holdings Inc [1995] LTL (26 October 1995) per its judge: "a mere 'fleeting presence' cannot be actual occupation"

== See also ==
- English land law
- English property law
