= Progress Property Co Ltd v Moorgarth Group Ltd =

- Court: Supreme Court of the United Kingdom
- Citation: [2010] UKSC 55

Case history
- Prior action: [2009] EWCA 629

Court membership
- Judges sitting: Lord Phillips (President); Lord Walker; Lord Mance; Lord Collins; Lord Clarke

Case opinions
- Lord Walker, Lord Mance

Keywords
- Return of capital

Progress Property Co Ltd v Moorgarth Group Ltd [2010] UKSC 55 is a UK company law case concerning the circumstances by which a transaction at an undervalue would be considered an unauthorised return of capital.

== Facts ==
Tradegro Ltd, which owned approximately 75% of Progress Properties, agreed to sell its shareholding in Progress to P, who owned the other 25%. It was a condition of that agreement that Tradegro Ltd would make Progress Properties transfer, under a separate sale agreement, its shareholding in YMS Properties Ltd, a subsidiary of the Progress Properties, to the Moorgarth Group Ltd, a subsidiary of Tradegro Ltd. So at the time of the sale of YMS Ltd its vendor and its purchaser were both under the control of T Ltd. Now led by its new management, Progress Properties alleged that the transfer of its shareholding in YMS Ltd to the Moorgarth had been at a gross undervalue and so was ultra vires and unlawful as an unauthorised return of capital. It claimed for return of the shares or compensation. It was accepted, however, that the director, Mr Moore, who procured the sale, acting on behalf of both Progress and Moorgarth, had genuinely believed that the sale was at market value.

The judge held that, even on the assumption that the sale of YMS Ltd had been at an undervalue, it was a genuine sale, not ultra vires and not an unauthorised distribution of Progress' assets. The Court of Appeal dismissed the Progress' appeal and held the sale was an intra vires for a proper purpose even if it had been at an undervalue.

== Judgment ==
The Supreme Court again dismissed the appeal and held that the transaction was sound because even though it was an extremely bad bargain in hindsight, it was negotiated in good faith and at arm's length. The court's task is to inquire into the true purpose and substance of the impugned transaction by investigating all the relevant facts, including the states of mind of the people acting on the company's behalf, though it is always possible that transactions can be unlawful regardless of the directors' state of mind. Accordingly, the transaction was neither ultra vires nor an unlawful reduction of capital. Lord Walker gave the leading judgment.

24. The essential issue then, is how the sale by PPC of its shareholding in YMS is to be characterised. That is how it was put by Sir Owen Dixon CJ in Davis Investments Pty Ltd v Commissioner of Stamp Duties (New South Wales) (1958) 100 CLR 392, 406 (a case about a company reorganisation effected at book value in which the High Court of Australia were divided on what was ultimately an issue of construction on a stamp duty statute). The same expression was used by Buxton LJ in MacPherson v European Strategic Bureau Ltd [2000] 2 BCLC 683, para 59. The deputy judge did not ask himself (or answer) that precise question. But he did (at paras 39-41) roundly reject the submission made on behalf of PPC that there is an unlawful return of capital "whenever the company has entered into a transaction with a shareholder which results in a transfer of value not covered by distributable profits, and regardless of the purpose of the transaction". A relentlessly objective rule of that sort would be oppressive and unworkable. It would tend to cast doubt on any transaction between a company and a shareholder, even if negotiated at arm's length and in perfect good faith, whenever the company proved, with hindsight, to have got significantly the worse of the transaction.

25. In the Court of Appeal Mummery LJ developed the deputy judge's line of thought into a more rounded conclusion (para 30):

"In this case the deputy judge noted that it had been accepted by PPC that the sale was entered into in the belief on the part of the director, Mr Moore, that the agreed price was at market value. In those circumstances there was no knowledge or intention that the shares should be disposed of at an undervalue. There was no reason to doubt the genuineness of the transaction as a commercial sale of the YMS1 shares. This was so, even though it appeared that the sale price was calculated on the basis of the value of the properties that was misunderstood by all concerned."

26. In seeking to undermine that conclusion Mr Collings QC (for PPC) argued strenuously that an objective approach is called for. The same general line is taken in a recent article by Dr Eva Micheler commenting on the Court of Appeal's decision, "Disguised Returns of Capital – An Arm's Length Approach," [2010] CLJ 151. This interesting article refers to a number of cases not cited to this court or to the courts below, and argues for what the author calls an arm's length approach.

27. If there were a stark choice between a subjective and an objective approach, the least unsatisfactory choice would be to opt for the latter. But in cases of this sort the court's real task is to inquire into the true purpose and substance of the impugned transaction. That calls for an investigation of all the relevant facts, which sometimes include the state of mind of the human beings who are orchestrating the corporate activity.

28. Sometimes their states of mind are totally irrelevant. A distribution described as a dividend but actually paid out of capital is unlawful, however technical the error and however well-meaning the directors who paid it. The same is true of a payment which is on analysis the equivalent of a dividend, such as the unusual cases (mentioned by Dr Micheler) of In re Walters' Deed of Guarantee [1933] Ch 321 (claim by guarantor of preference dividends) and Barclays Bank plc v British & Commonwealth Holdings plc [1996] 1 BCLC 1 (claim for damages for contractual breach of scheme for redemption of shares). Where there is a challenge to the propriety of a director's remuneration the test is objective (Halt Garage), but probably subject in practice to what has been called, in a recent Scottish case, a "margin of appreciation": Clydebank Football Club Ltd v Steedman 2002 SLT 109, para 76 (discussed further below). If a controlling shareholder simply treats a company as his own property, as the domineering master-builder did in In re George Newman & Co Ltd [1895] 1 Ch 674, his state of mind (and that of his fellow-directors) is irrelevant. It does not matter whether they were consciously in breach of duty, or just woefully ignorant of their duties. What they do is enough by itself to establish the unlawful character of the transaction.

29. The participants' subjective intentions are however sometimes relevant, and a distribution disguised as an arm's length commercial transaction is the paradigm example. If a company sells to a shareholder at a low value assets which are difficult to value precisely, but which are potentially very valuable, the transaction may call for close scrutiny, and the company's financial position, and the actual motives and intentions of the directors, will be highly relevant. There may be questions to be asked as to whether the company was under financial pressure compelling it to sell at an inopportune time, as to what advice was taken, how the market was tested, and how the terms of the deal were negotiated. If the conclusion is that it was a genuine arm's length transaction then it will stand, even if it may, with hindsight, appear to have been a bad bargain. If it was an improper attempt to extract value by the pretence of an arm's length sale, it will be held unlawful. But either conclusion will depend on a realistic assessment of all the relevant facts, not simply a retrospective valuation exercise in isolation from all other inquiries.

30. Pretence is often a badge of a bad conscience. Any attempt to dress up a transaction as something different from what it is likely to provoke suspicion. In Aveling Barford there were suspicious factors, such as Dr Lee's surprising evidence that he was ignorant of the Humberts' valuation, and the dubious authenticity of the "overage" document. But in the end the disparity between the valuations and the sale price of the land was sufficient, by itself, to satisfy Hoffmann J that the transaction could not stand.

31. The right approach is in my opinion well illustrated by the careful judgment of Lord Hamilton in Clydebank Football Club Ltd v Steedman 2002 SLT 109. It is an example of the problems which can arise with football clubs owned by limited companies, where some small shareholders see the club as essentially a community enterprise, and other more commercially-minded shareholders are concerned with what they see as underused premises ripe for profitable redevelopment. The facts are complicated, and the main issue was on section 320 of the Companies Act 1985 (approval by company in general meeting of acquisition of non-cash asset by director or connected person). But the judge also dealt with a claim under section 263 (unlawful distribution). He held that the sale of the club's derelict ground at Kilbowie Park, and another site originally purchased under an abortive plan for a new ground, was a genuine arm's-length sale even though effected at a price £165,000 less than the value as eventually determined by the court after hearing expert evidence. In para 76 Lord Hamilton said:

"It is also clear, in my view, that a mere arithmetical difference between the consideration given for the asset or assets and the figure or figures at which it or they are in subsequent proceedings valued retrospectively will not of itself mean that there has been a distribution. If the transaction is genuinely conceived of and effected as an exchange for value and the difference ultimately found does not reflect a payment 'manifestly beyond any possible justifiable reward for that in respect of which allegedly it is paid', does not give rise to an exchange 'at a gross undervalue' and is not otherwise unreasonably large, there will not to any extent be a 'dressed up return of capital'. In assessing the adequacy of the consideration, a margin of appreciation may properly be allowed."

The words quoted by Lord Hamilton are from Halt Garage and Aveling Barford.

32. In para 79 Lord Hamilton said:

"It is plain, in my view, that directors are liable only if it is established that in effecting the unlawful distribution they were in breach of their fiduciary duties (or possibly of contractual obligations, though that does not arise in the present case). Whether or not they were so in breach will involve consideration not only of whether or not the directors knew at the time that what they were doing was unlawful but also of their state of knowledge at that time of the material facts. In reviewing the then authorities Vaughan Williams J in Re Kingston Cotton Mill Co (No 2) said at [1896] 1 Ch, p347: 'In no one of [the cases cited] can I find that directors were held liable unless the payments were made with actual knowledge that the funds of the company were being misappropriated or with knowledge of the facts that established the misappropriation.' Although this case went to the Court of Appeal, this aspect of the decision was not quarrelled with (see [1896] 2 Ch 279)".

I agree with both those passages.

33. In this case there are concurrent findings that the sale of YMS1 to Moorgarth was a genuine commercial sale. The contrary was not pleaded or put to Mr Moore in cross-examination. I would dismiss this appeal.

Lord Mance and Lord Clarke delivered concurring judgments. Lord Phillips and Lord Collins agreed.

== See also ==
- UK company law
