= British Airways plc v Williams =

British Airways v Williams
- Court: Supreme Court of the United Kingdom
- Full case name: British Airways plc v Williams and others
- Argued: 24–25 February 2010
- Decided: 25 March 2010
- Neutral citation: [2010] UKSC 16
- Reported at: [2010] 2 All ER 1053

Case history
- Prior history: Appeal from British Airways Plc v Williams & Ors [2009] EWCA Civ 281 (3 April 2009), setting aside British Airways Plc v Williams & Ors, [2008] UKEAT 0377_07_2802
- Subsequent history: British Airways plc v Williams & Ors [2012] UKSC 43 (17 October 2012)
- Related cases: Williams and others v British Airways plc (Social policy) [2011] EUECJ C-155/10, Case C-155/10 (15 September 2011)

Holding
- Unanimously referred a number of questions to the ECJ regarding the level of pay which needed to be paid during annual leave and the level of discretion member states were entitled to in this area.; The ECJ subsequently ruled that all pay components which relate to the personal and professional status of an airline pilot must be maintained during that worker's paid annual leave, and it is up to the national court to assess that the criteria have been met.; Claims were remitted back to the employment tribunal for further consideration of the appropriate payments to be made to the pilots in respect of the periods of paid annual leave in issue.

Case opinions
- Majority: Lord Mance (Lords Walker, Brown, Clarke & Lady Hale concurring)

Area of law
- Employment, EU Law

British Airways plc v Williams (2011) C-155/10 is a UK labour law and EU law decision by the European Court of Justice regarding the right to holidays with pay, which is found in the Universal Declaration on Human Rights article 24, the Working Time Directive and the Working Time Regulations 1998. Williams itself was decided under analogous rules found in the Civil Aviation (Working Time) Regulations 2004. It held that variable components in pay, such as bonuses, must be included in the amount of pay people receive while they are on holiday.

== Facts ==
Williams, and other pilots who worked for British Airways claimed that their holiday pay was too low, because it only reflected his fixed salary, and not his bonuses. Williams' comprised a fixed annual salary, a "flying pay supplement" that went up the more he flew, and a "time away from base" which went up the more he was away from home. The flying and time away allowances were capped. Properly construed, his contract suggested that his holiday pay would be at the rate of only his fixed salary. Williams, however, contended that this was contrary to the Civil Aviation Working Time Directive, as implemented by the Civil Aviation (Working Time) Regulations 2004, (sector-specific implementations with the same objective as the Working Time Directive and the Working Time Regulations 1998 in this respect). In absence of particular provisions, the pay while on leave should be "normal remuneration". British Airways contended that because the Employment Rights Act 1996 sections 221 to 224 did not have provisions on how to determine a week's pay, the rate should be determined with reference to the contract.

Under the Civil Aviation (Working Time) Regulations 2004, which enacted the European directive 2000/79/EC, airline crew are entitled to a minimum of four weeks 'paid annual leave'. Under UK law, this meant that airline crew were in general entitled to 'normal or comparable pay' whilst on leave. BA crew were paid a basic fixed wage, but they also received additional payment in the form of a 'Flying Pay Supplement' and a 'Time Away from Base Allowance'. During periods of statutory leave, staff, including the appellants, were paid according to their basic wage, without any allowance for time that they would have spent flying, or away from base, had they been working according to their usual patterns.

A case was brought in the Employment Tribunals by approximately 2,750 BA pilots, who argued that the 'normal pay' condition under UK law meant that BA were obliged to pay them as though they had spent time away from base and on flights during their annual leave. Their claim was successful in both the Employment Tribunal and Employment Appeals Tribunal.

== Judgment ==
=== Court of Appeal ===
The Court of Appeal found for BA, holding that whilst European Directives set out a broad principle that employees were entitled to four weeks leave at a rate of pay which was comparable to their regular pay, BA were not in breach of any domestic statutory obligations by failing to pay employees exactly what they would have earned had they worked through their holiday.

=== Supreme Court ===
The Supreme Court declined to address the issues presented by the case and instead opted to refer a series of questions to the European Court of Justice regarding the Directives and the issues raised in the appeal. The certified questions asked:

1. to what extent the process of defining 'normal or comparable pay' fell within EU and/or domestic law,
2. whether it was sufficient that the level of pay agreed between employers and employees did not dissuade employees from taking their annual leave,
3. was it a requirement that employees were paid either (a) precisely their 'normal' pay or (b) at a comparable level to their 'normal' pay, or was neither option explicitly required by EU law,
4. assuming one of the options suggested by question 3 was correct, what period of time is relevant in determining a worker's 'normal' pay,
5. assuming one of the options suggested by question 3 was correct, what approach should be taken when a level of pay is dependent on a worker's level of engagement in particular activities (i.e. flying), what approach should be taken when a statutory limit to the amount of engagement a worker is permitted to undertake would have been breached had the worker actually carried it out.

=== European Court of Justice ===
The European Court of Justice subsequently ruled in 2011 that all pay components which relate to the personal and professional status of an airline pilot must be maintained during that worker's paid annual leave, and it was up to the national court to assess that the criteria have been met. The UKSC then ruled in 2012 that the claims were to be remitted back to the employment tribunal for further consideration of the appropriate payments to be made to the pilots in respect of the periods of paid annual leave in issue.

== See also ==
- 2010 Judgments of the Supreme Court of the United Kingdom
- Employment law
- Working Time Directive
- British Airways
