= Jennifer Eady =

British judge

The Honourable Mrs Justice Eady DBE
- Royal coat of arms of the United Kingdom

Justice of the High Court
- Incumbent
- Assumed office 1 October 2019
- Monarchs: Elizabeth II; Charles III

Personal details
- Born: 31 May 1965 (age 61) United Kingdom
- Education: St Hugh's College, Oxford

Dame Jennifer Jane Eady, DBE (born 31 May 1965) is a British High Court judge.

== Education ==
She was educated at Boston High School in Lincolnshire, gaining 9 O-levels in 1981. She worked with the Boston Playgoers theatre.

She studied politics, philosophy and economics at St Hugh's College, Oxford, completing a BA in 1986, and then earned a graduate diploma in law at the Polytechnic of Central London in 1988.

== Career ==
Eady was called to the bar at Inner Temple and practised employment law after completing her pupillage at Old Square Chambers in 1990, remaining there until 2013. She served as a recorder from 2003 to 2013, took silk in 2006, and became a senior circuit judge in 2013. She was chair of the Employment Tribunals and a part-time employment judge from 2001 until 2008, a member of the Acas Council from 2008 to 2014, and a trustee of the Free Representation Unit from 2006 to 2014.

On 1 October 2019, Eady was appointed a judge of the High Court and assigned to the Queen's Bench Division. She received the customary damehood in 2019. From 2022–2025, she served as President of the Employment Appeal Tribunal, replacing Sir Akhlaq Choudhury.

== Personal life ==
She is married and has one son.
