= Vento bands =

Tiers of compensation for discrimination in UK employment law

Vento bands are tiered values for compensation for damages payable for injury to feelings and psychiatric injury awarded by the Employment Tribunals of England and Wales and of Scotland. Their name is derived from the case of Vento v Chief Constable of West Yorkshire Police (No. 2) (2002) when the Court of Appeal of England and Wales identified three broad bands of compensation for injury to feelings awards which were distinct from compensation awards for psychiatric or similar personal injury.

The lower band was initially set at £500 to £5,000 (less serious cases); the middle band was set at £5,000 to £15,000 (cases that did not merit an award in the upper band); and the upper band was set at £15,000 to £25,000 (the most serious cases), with the most exceptional cases capable of exceeding £25,000.

Following the decision of the Court of Appeal in England and Wales in De Souza v Vinci Construction (UK) Ltd. [2017], the Presidents of the Employment Tribunals in England and Wales and in Scotland launched a consultation exercise on 20 July 2017 on proposed changes to the bands and, supported by a majority of responses in favour of raising the bands, they were uprated with effect from 11 September 2017. The revised bands will consist of a lower band of £800 to £8,400 (less serious cases); a middle band of £8,400 to £25,200 (cases that did not merit an award in the upper band); and an upper band of £25,200 to £42,000 (the most serious cases), with the most exceptional cases capable of exceeding £42,000.

As of 6 April 2025, the bands have been updated as follows
