= Stockholm Finance Ltd v Garden Holdings Inc =

English land law case from 1995

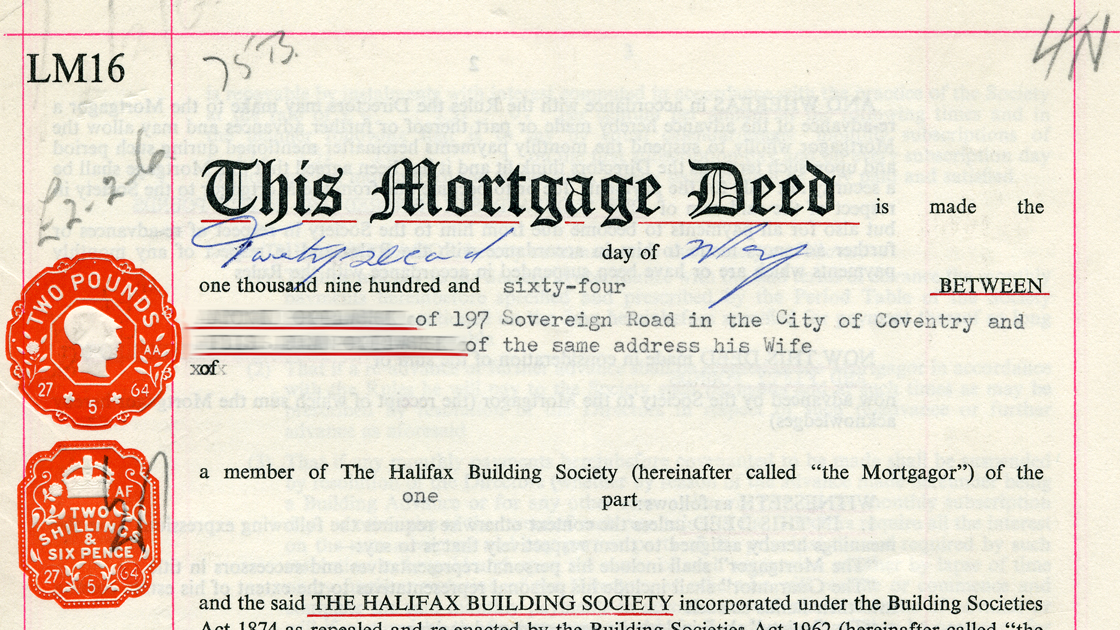
- Old format of a Mortgage Deed
- Court: High Court, Chancery Division
- Decided: 1995
- Citations: [1995] NPC 162 [1995] LTL (26 October 1995)

Case history
- Prior action: none
- Subsequent action: none

Court membership
- Judge sitting: Robert Walker J

Keywords
- Actual occupation; lengthy absence; overriding interest Land Registration Act 2002, Schedule 3; mortgage terms

Stockholm Finance Ltd v Garden Holdings Inc [1995] is an English land law case, concerning the meaning of actual occupation for the purpose of overriding interests in registered land.

== Facts ==
The claimant lender issued notices, adhered to proper procedure, and initiated legal action for possession, as the secured loan required actual occupation. The Saudi Princess, who occupied the property through an arrangement with the defendant company, asserted that she had maintained actual occupation of the house, including retaining clothing, furniture, and caretaking arrangements. The claimant cited the Princess’s acknowledgment that she had not been in the home for more than a year and had only been intermittently resident prior to that.

The claimant plead the Princess's admittance of not being in the home for more than a year and having only been intermittently resident before.

== Judgment ==
The judge ruled that she was not in occupation of her London house primarily because she had not been in it for fourteen months up to and including the inspection date.

A court would decide on whether a person's intermittent presence was being "in actual occupation" of a house (that is specifically "whether a person’s intermittent presence at a house which is fully furnished, and ready for almost immediate use, should be seen as continuous occupation marked (but not interrupted) by occasional absences, or whether...a pattern of alternating periods of presence and absence").

This is:

...a matter of perception which defies deep analysis. Not only the length of any absence, but also the reason for it, may be material (a holiday or a business trip may be easier to reconcile with continuing and unbroken occupation than a move to a second home, even though the duration is the same in each case). But there must come a point at which a person’s absence from his house is so prolonged that the notion of his continuing to be in actual occupation of it becomes insupportable; and in my judgment that point must have been reached in this case, long before Mr Dawkins visited the house on 4 January 1990...By then Princess Madawi had not set foot in the property for over a year: she had for over a year been living with her mother in the Islamic household at Riyadh.’

== See also ==
- English land law
- English property law
