= 2018 Westminster car attack =

Car attack in Westminster

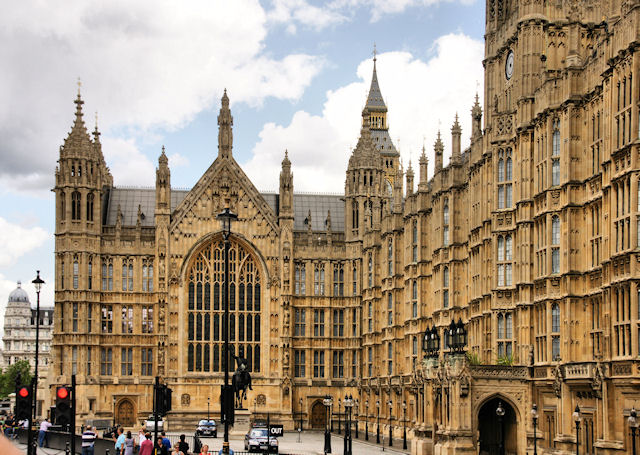
1	Ford Fiesta vehicle collides with cyclists at Parliament Square
2	Vehicle collides with security barrier outside Old Palace Yard
- Date: 14 August 2018; 7 years ago
- Time: 07:37 (BST, GMT/UTC +1)
- Location: Near Old Palace Yard, Westminster, London, United Kingdom; 51.499206°N 0.1255038°W
- Injuries: 3
- Arrests: 1
- Convicted: Salih Khater

On 14 August 2018, three people were injured when a silver Ford Fiesta hit them near the Palace of Westminster, London, England. The car then went on to crash into the separation barrier of the pavement situated between St Margaret Street / Abingdon Street and Old Palace Yard. The Metropolitan Police responded within seconds and arrested the driver, Salih Khater, without further incident. An ambulance immediately behind the Ford stopped and gave assistance to the injured. Khater was subsequently found guilty of two counts of attempted murder and sentenced to life in prison.

== Events ==
The incident occurred at 07:37 BST on 14 August 2018. A silver Ford Fiesta was captured on CCTV negotiating Parliament Square, before making a sharp left turn and going the wrong way along the empty northbound lane of St. Margaret Street and then crossing a pedestrian island onto the southbound lane, hitting cyclists and pedestrians in the process. The car then progressed into Abingdon Street and branched left into an access road for Old Palace Yard where it crashed into a closed barrier and came to a stop near the House of Lords. The incident lasted 15 seconds. Three people sustained injuries, with one having serious, but not life-threatening injuries.

The Metropolitan Police stated that the incident appeared to be a deliberate act. The Counterterrorism Chief of the Metropolitan Police reported that police did not believe the suspect to be known to the Security Service (MI5) or to the counterterrorism policing unit. A witness told reporters that the car had accelerated after hitting the cyclists rather than slowing down.

A UK Government official described a 47-second video of road users including a white van apparently tailing the suspect prior to the incident as "classic security behaviour".

The Independent reported friends of the arrested man saying that the crash may have been accidental.

== Investigation ==
Salih Khater, a 29-year-old male British citizen from Birmingham who entered the UK in 2010 as a refugee from Sudan, was detained by police at the scene on suspicion of terror offences. He was known to police in his local area but not as a national security threat. The Assistant Commissioner leading the investigation said that Khater initially refused to cooperate with the police. The police searched three addresses in the Midlands on the evening of the incident, two in Birmingham and a home in Nottingham. On 15 August 2018, police announced that Khater was being held on suspicion of attempted murder as well as an 'act of terrorism'. On 18 August, Khater was charged with one count of attempted murder of members of the public and one count of attempted murder of police officers. On 20 August, at Westminster Magistrates' Court, he was remanded in custody to appear at the Old Bailey on 31 August.

== Trial ==
Khater was due to stand trial on 4 February 2019, but in January 2019, Mr Justice Sweeney pushed the date back to 24 June 2019. The defendant entered not guilty pleas to all charges, but did not provide any further comments. He was remanded in custody.

On 17 July 2019, Khater was found guilty at the Old Bailey of two counts of attempted murder. He was remanded in custody to be sentenced on 7 October.

On 14 October 2019, Khater was sentenced to life imprisonment, with a minimum term of 15 years. Sentencing, Mrs Justice McGowan said Khater had acted with "terrorist motives".

== Reactions ==
Prime Minister Theresa May tweeted, "My thoughts are with those injured in the incident in Westminster and my thanks to the emergency services for their immediate and courageous response." London Mayor Sadiq Khan expressed similar sentiments, adding that "all Londoners, like me, utterly condemn all acts of terrorism on our city. The response of Londoners today shows that we will never be cowed, intimidated or divided by any terrorist attack." Labour Party leader Jeremy Corbyn tweeted, "My thoughts are with those hurt and injured outside Parliament this morning in what is being treated as a terrorist incident. Our thanks go to our emergency services who responded immediately. Their bravery keeps us safe day in, day out."

Mayor Khan and Metropolitan Police Commissioner Cressida Dick said that Parliament Square could be pedestrianised, stating that vehicle attacks had become the terrorist's "weapon of choice" in Europe and the western world.

United States President Donald Trump tweeted that "these animals are crazy and must be dealt with through toughness and strength".

== See also ==
- 2017 Westminster attack
- 2017 Finsbury Park attack
