= Vento v Chief Constable of West Yorkshire Police =

Vento v CC of West Yorkshire Police
- Court: England and Wales Court of Appeal
- Citation: [2002] EWCA Civ 1871

Keywords
- Discrimination, damages

Vento v Chief Constable of West Yorkshire Police [2002] EWCA Civ 1871 is a UK labour law case, concerning the measure of damages for discrimination under the Sex Discrimination Act 1975 (now covered by the Equality Act 2010). It set out a three band scale of damages, known as the Vento bands, which are updated each year for inflation.

== Facts ==
In December 1995, Vento joined West Yorkshire Police. Whilst making good progress within the first year of her career, other officers criticised her conduct and character, as well as her personal life, described as occurring in an 'unwarranted, aggressive and demoralising manner'. As a result of the behaviour, Vento took some time off work, however, on returning to work, the incidents continued.

Vento was dismissed from West Yorkshire Police in 1997 and in 1998, brought a claim that her dismissal was as a result of unlawful sex discrimination.

== Judgment ==
The Court of Appeal of England and Wales held that damages should be reduced, in order to make the scale consistent with awards in other fields of law.

Employment Tribunals and those who practise in them might find it helpful if this Court were to identify three broad bands of compensation for injury to feelings, as distinct from compensation for psychiatric or similar personal injury.

i) The top band should normally be between £15,000 and £25,000. Sums in this range should be awarded in the most serious cases, such as where there has been a lengthy campaign of discriminatory harassment on the ground of sex or race. This case falls within that band. Only in the most exceptional case should an award of compensation for injury to feelings exceed £25,000.

ii) The middle band of between £5,000 and £15,000 should be used for serious cases, which do not merit an award in the highest band.

iii) Awards of between £500 and £5,000 are appropriate for less serious cases, such as where the act of discrimination is an isolated or one off occurrence. In general, awards of less than £500 are to be avoided altogether, as they risk being regarded as so low as not to be a proper recognition of injury to feelings. There is, of course, within each band considerable flexibility, allowing tribunals to fix what is considered to be fair, reasonable and just compensation in the particular circumstances of the case.

The decision whether or not to award aggravated damages and, if so, in what amount must depend on the particular circumstances of the discrimination and on the way in which the complaint of discrimination has been handled.

Common sense requires that regard should also be had to the overall magnitude of the sum total of the awards of compensation for non-pecuniary loss made under the various headings of injury to feelings, psychiatric damage and aggravated damage. In particular, double recovery should be avoided by taking appropriate account of the overlap between the individual heads of damage. The extent of overlap will depend on the facts of each particular case.

Result

For these reasons, we allow the appeal and the cross appeal against the decision of the Employment Appeal Tribunal, restore the figure for financial loss, substitute for the decision of the Employment Tribunal the sum of £18,000 for injury to feelings, plus £5,000 for aggravated damages, and leave the damages for psychiatric injury at £9,000.

== See also ==
- UK labour law

== Notes ==
For cases begun on or after 6 April 2025, the uprated Vento Bands for injury to feelings awards are,

  Lower band:  £1,200 to £11,700 (for less serious cases).

  Middle band: £11,700 to £35,200 (mid-range cases).

  Upper band: £35,200 to £58,700 (most serious cases).

The bands are usually updated annually on 6 April and the date is relevant to when a claim is presented to a Tribunal.
