= Murder of Lilia Valutyte =

2022 stabbing of a 9-year-old girl in Lincolnshire, England

- Photo of Lilia Valutyte
- Location: Boston, Lincolnshire, England
- Date: 28 July 2022 c. 6:20 p.m. BST (UTC+01)
- Attack type: Stabbing
- Deaths: 1
- Perpetrator: Deividas Skebas
- Motive: Unknown
- Charges: Murder
- Verdict: Guilty
- Judge: Mrs Justice McGowan (trial of the facts); Mr Justice Choudhury (criminal trial)
- Born: 2 February 2013; Boston, Lincolnshire
- Died: 28 July 2022 (aged 9); Boston, Lincolnshire

On 28 July 2022 at around 6:20 p.m., Lilia Valutyte, a nine-year-old girl, was stabbed in Boston, Lincolnshire, England outside an embroidery shop. She was later pronounced dead at Boston Pilgrim Hospital. Before the attack, it is understood that Valutyte was playing with hula hoops with her younger sister. Deividas Skebas was found to be responsible for her killing. Skebas was convicted of murdering Valutyte in February 2026 and was sentenced to life imprisonment with a minimum term of 25 years.

== Background ==
Lilia Valutyte was born on 2 February 2013 at Boston Pilgrim Hospital and lived in Boston. Valutyte, who was of Lithuanian origin, also had a younger sister. She studied at Boston Pioneers Academy and was a pupil at Carlton Road Primary School prior to her death.

Deividas Skebas is a Lithuanian man born on 8 December 1999 who prior to his arrest was living in Boston. He worked as a fruit picker. He had entered the UK in 2020, before returning to Lithuania. He had then re-entered the UK on 2 July 2022, just three weeks before the killing, and had arrived in Boston later that day. He suffered from a psychiatric illness and schizophrenia and had a history of previous mental illness.

== Killing ==
On 28 July 2022 at around 6:20 p.m. local time, nine-year-old Lilia Valutyte was playing with hula hoops outside an embroidery shop on Fountain Lane, Boston with her younger sister before she was stabbed. A man was seen on CCTV walking down Wormgate and Fountain Lane five minutes before the attack. Valutyte's mother was just yards away when the attack took place and heard someone screaming "mum." She went outside to find her younger daughter standing just metres away from her big sister who was bleeding to death. Valutyte was taken to Boston Pilgrim Hospital where she later died.

== Investigation & legal proceedings ==
On 30 July 2022, a 22-year-old man was arrested on suspicion of the murder of Lilia Valutyte. Two other people were also arrested but were released with no further action. On the evening of 31 July 2022, 22-year-old Deividas Skebas was charged with the murder. On 1 August 2022, Skebas appeared at Lincoln Crown Court; he did not enter a plea and was remanded into custody. In August 2022, Skebas was attacked by prisoners at HM Prison Wakefield, West Yorkshire with a prison shank and was airlifted to hospital.

Skebas was due to appear at Lincoln Crown Court for another hearing on 19 September 2022, however on 23 September 2022 this was adjourned to allow reports to be carried out. Skebas did not enter a plea. Another hearing took place at the same court on 9 December 2022, and again, Skebas did not enter a plea and the case was adjourned to allow additional medical assessments to be carried out. An additional hearing for Skebas was held on 19 January 2023. Skebas did not attend the hearing. The case was again adjourned. On 22 February 2023, a hearing took place at Lincoln Crown Court in Skebas's absence. The case was again adjourned until 28 February 2023 when a hearing was meant to take place in front of a High Court judge. Skebas was also due to stand trial on this day. However, Judge Simon Hirst vacated the hearing until 17 April 2023.

On 17 April 2023, it was ruled that Skebas was unfit to enter a plea or to stand a traditional trial. There would then be a trial of the facts before a jury. The trial would be to determine whether Skebas committed the act of stabbing Valutyte, though the outcome would not result in a criminal conviction. Skebas was not required to take part in these proceedings or be present in court. The trial was expected to last two days and would begin on 10 July 2023.

== Trial of the facts ==
The trial of the facts for Skebas began at Lincoln Crown Court on 10 July 2023. The judge, Mrs Justice McGowan, told the jury of six men and six women that they would "not be asked to say guilty or not guilty" and said that Skebas "is seriously mentally ill and is not here."

Prosecution barrister Christopher Donnellan KC, opened the case by alleging that while Valutyte and her younger sister were playing with hula hoops and a toy pram outside the shop where their mother worked, Skebas had approached and increased his pace as he got closer to them. Donnellan added that Valutyte had moved off the road and onto the pavement to move out of his way before Skebas had pulled a knife out of the waist of his trousers and had stabbed Valutyte through her chest and heart. An off-duty police officer as well as doctors and paramedics attempted to save Valutyte, but she was confirmed dead at 7:11 p.m., less than an hour after the killing. The off-duty police officer, who gave evidence at the trial, said that he noticed a male pacing close to the junction at Fountain Lane and Wormgate. He claimed that his attention was drawn to the man's behaviour and that he believed that it was suspicious. He then claimed that he searched for his headphones before he heard a large metallic clank. He then said he turned around and saw the same male coming towards him. After the man had seen the off-duty officer he claims the man "quickened." The officer said he then made a few steps to follow the man before hearing a scream. He said the scream sounded like it came from an adult female and he described it as "anguished." He then claimed that he immediately walked back towards Fountain Lane after hearing the scream and recalled seeing two people there: a girl on the ground, and an adult female. He told the court that he took over for the girl's mother and started CPR on the girl.

Police subsequently launched a manhunt in an attempt to locate the man. Skebas was arrested two days later. A Sabatier paring knife was found behind a radiator at a property where Skebas was staying. The knife was consistent with the stab wound found on Valutyte. It was alleged that Skebas had purchased this knife from a local Wilko shop on 26 July 2022, two days before the killing. There was also a grey Calvin Klein T-shirt with blood stains matching Valutyte's DNA found at the property. The trial heard that during interview Skebas had admitted to stabbing Valutyte, saying "I grabbed the knife and I stabbed her." A police officer who observed Skebas in his cell also mentioned of his "unique walk." CCTV footage of Skebas's route from the street where he was living to Fountain Lane at 5:08 p.m. on the day of the killing was also captured.

Andrew Campbell-Tiech KC, Skebas's defence barrister, said that he was unable to challenge any of the evidence as he had "no instruction." He claimed that he had "acknowledged" the death of a child at the hands of a stranger was a "nightmare" but also told jurors that he believed the answers Skebas gave in interview "are bizarre in the extreme."

Following the two-day trial, on 11 July 2023, the jury found Skebas to have been responsible for the act of stabbing Valutyte. It took 30 minutes of deliberating to reach this verdict. He was sentenced to an indefinite hospital order at Rampton secure hospital, Nottinghamshire. The judge said that Skebas could face a traditional trial at a later date if his mental health had improved.

On 22 May 2025, a hearing was held at Lincoln Crown Court, Skebas was next due to appear at the same court on 28 July 2025.

== Criminal proceedings ==
On 3 October 2025, Skebas appeared at Lincoln Crown Court via videolink and pleaded not guilty to Valutyte's murder. He did plead guilty to manslaughter by reason of diminished responsibility. Skebas was remanded in custody and a further hearing was set to take place at the same court on 5 December 2025. Christopher Donnellan KC asked for the prosecution to be given time to consider whether they would accept Skebas's plea. Judge Simon Hirst told Skebas that he would be facing a trial for murder from 27 January 2026 if the prosecution decided they still wanted to proceed with the charge of murder.

On 5 December 2025, it was reported that the prosecution would pursue the charge of murder and that Skebas would be facing trial beginning on 27 January 2026 and that the trial would be expected to last seven days. It was also reported that a pre-trial hearing would be held on 14 January 2026.

Skebas pleaded guilty to manslaughter but denied murder, his defence arguing that he was in a state of psychosis due to schizophrenia and was not responsible for his actions. The prosecution argued that Skebas had planned the crime in advance, as he had bought the knife used in the murder two days beforehand, and that a psychiatrist who examined him after his arrest found no evidence of psychosis.

Skebas was found guilty of murder on 5 February 2026. On 25 February, he was sentenced by Mr Justice Choudhury at Lincoln Crown Court to life imprisonment with a minimum term of 25 years. Skebas will become eligible to apply for parole on 19 February 2051.

== Reactions ==
Priti Patel, the then Home Secretary tweeted that she was "appalled" by the killing.

Matt Warman, MP for Boston and Skegness tweeted: "it is vital that those responsible are brought to justice."

== Aftermath ==
=== Funeral ===
On 2 September 2022, Lilia Valutyte's funeral was held at St Botolph's Church, Boston. Her coffin was carried by a white horse-drawn carriage. Her small white coffin was covered in butterflies and was carried by pallbearers wearing pink ties. Flowers and other tributes were also left in memory of Valutyte. Many teddy bears were also left in memory of Valutyte. It was later revealed that Valutyte's mother had donated these teddy bears to families in Lithuania and to Ukrainian refugees.

=== Memorials ===
In February 2023, Valutyte's mother revealed that there were plans to build a memorial in memory of Valutyte. The memorial would be a child-sized metal sculpture of a girl playing with hula hoops, as this was what Valutyte was doing in her final moments. This memorial would be built in a memorial garden near Wormgate. Valutyte is also remembered by a mosaic bearing her name and an image of an angel on public display in Dolphin Lane. The artwork is part of a large piece and also features the Baltic symbol of unity along with the phrase "Unity is Strength."

=== Mother's election as local councillor ===
In April 2023, it was reported that Lina Savickiene, Valutyte's mother, had been nominated to stand up as councillor for Boston as part of the Boston Independents group. Savickiene had attended a meeting relating to public safety in the town and had encouraged the community to "come together" following the death of her daughter. In May 2023, it was reported that Savickiene had been elected as Boston councillor following the 2023 local elections.

== See also ==
- Killing of Emily Jones
- Sharon Carr
