= HJ and HT v Home Secretary =

- Court: Supreme Court of the United Kingdom
- Full case name: HJ (Iran) and HT (Cameroon) v Secretary of State for the Home Department
- Decided: 7 July 2010
- Citation: [2010] UKSC 31
- Transcript: Judgement

Case history
- Prior action: [2009] EWCA Civ 172

Court membership
- Judges sitting: Hope, Rodger, Walker, Collins, Dyson

Case opinions
- The Supreme Court unanimously allows the appeal, holding that the ‘reasonable tolerability’ test applied by the Court of Appeal is contrary to the Convention and should not be followed in the future. HJ and HT’s cases are remitted for reconsideration in light of the detailed guidance provided by the Supreme Court.

Keywords
- Right of asylum

HJ (Iran) and HT (Cameroon) v Secretary of State for the Home Department [2010] UKSC 31 is a case decided by the Supreme Court of the United Kingdom concerning two men, from Iran and Cameroon respectively, claiming asylum in the United Kingdom on the grounds of their homosexuality. The men's claims had previously been turned down on the basis they would not face persecution in their own countries if they would conceal their sexuality. The appeal therefore centred on the question as to whether the men on their return could reasonably be expected to tolerate this requirement of discretion; the so-called 'discretion' or 'reasonable tolerability' test. Interventions were made by the Equality and Human Rights Commission and the United Nations High Commissioner for Refugees.

The case was heard between 10 and 12 May 2010 with a judgement delivered on 7 July 2010, in which the Court ruled unanimously that the men could not be expected to conceal their sexuality in this way, and that it was wrong to apply the so-called 'discretion test' to such claims. The cases were then both remitted to be reconsidered according to the advice contained in the judgement.

== Facts ==
HJ is a gay Iranian man who arrived in the United Kingdom on 17 December 2001 and claimed asylum. HT is a gay man from Cameroon who had been on his way to Montreal when he was arrested at Gatwick Airport, London, on 19 January 2007 for using a false passport, at which time he claimed asylum.

The United Kingdom is a party to the United Nations Convention Relating to the Status of Refugees, which defines a refugee as "a person who owing to a well-founded fear of being persecuted for reasons of race, religion, nationality, membership of a particular social group or political opinion... is unable or, owing to such fear, is unwilling to return to [his country of nationality]." Homosexuality is generally accepted, and was accepted in this case, as forming membership of a particular social group.

At the time asylum in the United Kingdom was controlled by the UK Border Agency as part of the Home Office, which refused asylum in both cases. Both men appealed their individual decisions without success, arriving in a conjoined appeal to the Court of Appeal (Pill and Keene LJJ and Sir Paul Kennedy), turned down on 10 March 2009. The Court of Appeal found that the Asylum and Immigration Tribunal had been entitled to find that HJ could reasonably be expected to tolerate the need for discretion on his return to Iran, and therefore was not entitled to asylum. The Court found that HT would be discreet on his return to Cameroon, and that he had not therefore established that there was a real risk of persecution. The Court decided that, on the basis of the 'discretion test', a State party to the Refugee Convention would be entitled to return a homosexual asylum-seeker to his country of origin if he would conceal his identity and sexuality and it would not be unreasonable to expect him to tolerate this.

== Judgment ==
The Supreme Court, comprising Deputy President Lord Hope, Lords Rodger, Walker and Collins and Sir John Dyson, rejected the 'discretion test', finding that, according to Lord Hope, "to pretend that [a person's sexual orientation or sexuality] does not exist, or that the behaviour by which it manifests itself can be suppressed, is to deny the members of this group their fundamental right to be what they are."

Lord Rodger stated in his speech that a consideration of sexual identity should not be restricted to participation in particular sexual acts, but to all aspects of a person's life:

To illustrate the point with trivial stereotypical examples from British society: just as male heterosexuals are free to enjoy themselves playing rugby, drinking beer and talking about girls with their mates, so male homosexuals are to be free to enjoy themselves going to Kylie concerts, drinking exotically coloured cocktails and talking about boys with their straight female mates. Mutatis mutandis – and in many cases the adaptations would obviously be great – the same must apply to other societies. In other words, gay men are to be as free as their straight equivalents in the society concerned to live their lives in the way that is natural to them as gay men, without the fear of persecution.

The cases were both remitted to the Tribunal for reconsideration taking into account the guidelines provided by the Supreme Court.

== See also ==
- Right of asylum
- LGBT rights in Iran
- LGBT rights in Cameroon
- LGBT rights in the United Kingdom
- 2010 Judgments of the Supreme Court of the United Kingdom
