= Akhlaq Choudhury =

British judge (born 1967)

The Honourable Mr Justice Choudhury
- Royal coat of arms of the United Kingdom

High Court Judge King's Bench Division
- Incumbent
- Assumed office 2 October 2017
- Monarchs: Elizabeth II; Charles III

Personal details
- Born: 23 April 1967 (age 59) Winchester, England
- Education: University of Glasgow; School of Oriental and African Studies

Sir Akhlaq Ur-Rahman Choudhury (Bengali: আখালেক উর-রহমান চৌধুরী; born 23 April 1967) is a British High Court judge of England and Wales. In 2017, he was made Knight Bachelor on appointment, becoming the first British-Bangladeshi and Muslim to be appointed to the High Court of Justice.

== Early life and education ==
Choudhury was born on 23 April 1967 to a Bengali Muslim Choudhury family in Winchester, Hampshire, England. His father was a restaurateur, and hailed from Zakiganj, Sylhet District. When Choudhury was four years old, his family moved to Scotland where he grew up in Bishopbriggs on the outskirts of Glasgow.

Choudhury attended Balmuildy Primary and then Bishopbriggs High School for five years. In 1988, he graduated from University of Glasgow with a BSc degree in physics. In 1991, he graduated from School of Oriental and African Studies, University of London with a first-class honours LLB.

== Career ==
In 1992, Choudhury moved to London, he was called to the Bar (Inner Temple) and started practising as a barrister at 11 King's Bench Walk Chambers (now known as 11KBW).

Between 1999 and 2005, Choudhury was a member of the Attorney General's panel of approved counsel in which capacity he acted for and advised the Foreign and Commonwealth Office, the Ministry of Defence, HM Revenue and Customs and other Government departments. Between 2009 and 2011, he was a committee member of the Employment Law Bar Association. He was one of the standing counsel for the Information Commissioner's Office.

In 2009, Choudhury was appointed as a recorder on the South East Circuit. In 2015, he was appointed Queen's Counsel. In 2016, he was appointed as a deputy High Court Judge.

In August 2017, Choudhury was one of the five new appointees as judges of the High Court of Justice, effective from 2 October. He was the first British person of Bangladeshi origin and Muslim faith to have been appointed as a Justice of the High Court of England and Wales and was assigned to the Queen's Bench Division by the Lord Chief Justice of England and Wales. Choudhury is among two Bangladeshi-origin Queen's Counsel. On 20 December 2018, Choudhury was appointed as the President of the Employment Appeal Tribunal with effect from 1 January 2019. He stood down on 31 December 2021 and was succeeded by Dame Jennifer Eady.

Choudhury was a member of the Attorney General's A-panel of counsel and advised the Foreign and Commonwealth Office, the Ministry of Defence, HM Revenue and Customs and various other government departments. He was retained as counsel for the Information Commissioner and appeared in cases in the area of freedom of information and data protection law.

== Awards and recognition ==
In October 2017, Choudhury was appointed Knight Bachelor in 2017 Special Honours for members of the judiciary.

== Personal life ==
Choudhury lives in Northwood, London, with his wife, Safina, and their three children.

== Notable cases ==
Notable cases heard by Choudhury include:

- Murder of Lilia Valutyte

== See also ==
- British Bangladeshi
- List of British Bangladeshis
