= Maura McGowan =

British judge

The Honourable Mrs. Justice McGowan DBE
- Royal coat of arms of the United Kingdom

Justice of the High Court
- Incumbent
- Assumed office 2014

Personal details
- Born: 27 January 1957 (age 69) London, England
- Education: University of Manchester

Dame Maura Patricia McGowan, DBE (born 27 January 1957), styled The Hon. Mrs Justice McGowan, is a judge of the High Court of England and Wales.

== Personal life and education ==
She was educated at Virgo Fidelis Convent School and the University of Manchester.

McGowan is a Trustee of the London Irish Centre.

== Career ==
She was called to the bar at Middle Temple in 1980 and began work at '2 Bedford Row' and 'Lincoln House chambes', specialising in Criminal law.

She was appointed King's Counsel (previously Queen's) in 2001.

McGowan was appointed as a Recorder in 2000 and assigned to the South Eastern circuit. She was appointed a High Court judge in 2014 and assigned to the King's Bench Division. She received the customary Dame Commander in November 2014.

McGowan was elected a Bencher of Middle Temple in 2005 and later, a Treasurer for 2022.

== Notable cases ==
- Murder of Rikki Neave
- John Worboys
- 2018 Westminster car attack
- Killing of Lilia Valutyte
