= Murder of Rikki Neave =

1994 child murder in Peterborough, England

Rikki Neave
- Born: 4 March 1988; Peterborough, England
- Died: 28 November 1994 (aged 6); Peterborough, England
- Cause of death: Strangulation
- Known for: Victim of murder

Rikki Neave was a six-year-old boy who was murdered on 28 November 1994 by a 13-year-old boy, James Watson, in Peterborough, England. In 1996, his mother, Ruth Neave, was tried and acquitted of his murder. Watson was convicted of the murder in 2022 after new DNA evidence was found.

== Murder ==
Rikki Neave was born on 4 March 1988 and lived on the Welland Estate in Peterborough, Cambridgeshire, England. On 28 November 1994, he was strangled by a 13-year-old boy, James Watson. His naked body was found in woods next to the A15 road the following day.

== Investigation ==
=== Ruth Neave ===
At the time of the murder, Rikki's mother Ruth was the only adult living in the family house. Her neighbours shared that Ruth had a drug addiction and that her parenting skills were poor. She previously physically abused her children, claiming it was a form of discipline, and this attracted visits by the police and social services during the early 1990s. Many neighbours believed she had killed her son, and the police treated her as the prime suspect. In 1996, she was tried and acquitted of the murder. Before the trial, she had pleaded guilty to child cruelty offences, for which she was sentenced to seven years' imprisonment. Following her trial the police said they would not be looking for any other suspects related to Rikki's murder.

In 2014 the head of the local major crime unit met with Ruth, to discuss the case's evidence. He decided to open a cold case investigation, believing that Ruth wasn't responsible for the murder. Upon reopening the investigation, they found numerous issues with the evidence in the case. The wheelie bin where Rikki's clothes had found had been lost, and there was no record that the bin had been forensically examined. However, the cold case unit did find fibre samples that had been taken from Rikki's clothes in 1994. DNA testing found not only Rikki's DNA on these samples, but James Watson's.

=== James Watson ===
Watson was born on 1 April 1981 and was also from the Welland Estate. At the time of the murder he was 13 and lived in Woodgate children's home. Watson had convictions for various offences, and when he was 11 he sexually assaulted a five-year-old boy. Despite being aware of being gay, when Watson was 15, he had a sexual relationship with a girl who lived at Woodgate and they had a son. The girl claimed they had intercourse 5 times, and also alleged that during one instance of intercourse in the woods Watson strangled her during ejaculation, although Watson denied both claims, insisting they had intercourse only once.

Witnesses had seen Watson playing with Rikki on the day of his disappearance in 1994. When initially questioned by the police, he claimed he'd never been near Rikki. But when he was questioned again by the cold case unit, he claimed he possibly lifted Rikki to see over a fence. Police investigation found footage from 1994, that showed the estate redevelopment, and proved that the fence had not been in place at the time of Rikki's murder. Watson was arrested for the murder in April 2016.

After his arrest, Watson fled to Portugal and was extradited back to the UK. He was tried for murder at London's Old Bailey from 18 January to 21 April 2022. Amongst other evidence against him was new DNA findings which revealed his DNA was on Rikki's clothing. Watson was convicted of the murder and on 24 June he was sentenced to life by judge Mrs Justice McGowan, with a minimum of 15 years.

In June 2023, Watson was granted permission to appeal against his conviction. His lawyer argued before the Court of Appeal that Watson was not able to get a fair trial because too much of the evidence from which the killer's DNA could have been recovered was lost or destroyed in the intervening years. On 4 September, an appeals panel of three judges upheld the conviction, ruling that Watson had received a fair trial.
