= Industrial Cases Reports =

Law report

The Industrial Cases Reports is a series of law reports published by the Incorporated Council of Law Reporting. It focuses on employment law, covering cases from the Employment Appeal Tribunal and above.
