= British Steel Corp v Cleveland Bridge and Engineering Co Ltd =

English law case

British Steel Corporation v Cleveland Bridge and Engineering Co Ltd
- Court: High Court
- Citation: [1984] 1 All ER 504

Case opinions
- Robert Goff J

Keywords
- pre-contractual negotiations, letters of intent

British Steel Corporation v Cleveland Bridge and Engineering Co Ltd [1984] 1 All ER 504 is an English contract law case concerning agreement.

== Facts ==
Steel nodes were delivered to the defendants after a letter of intent to buy, but no formal contract had been concluded because the claimants refused to use the defendants’ terms, and negotiations took so long. No agreement was reached on progress payments and liability for late delivery, and defendants refused to pay because of lateness and nodes coming out of sequence. British Steel sued to recover the money, and Cleveland Bridge sought damages for late payment.

== Judgment ==
Robert Goff J's judgment accepted that a letter of intent could amount to an executory contract, but it did not in this case due to the negotiations being ongoing. The court considered but rejected the submission that the defendants' terms could have amounted to a standing offer that could be accepted by starting the work. Instead, the court decided that no contract had been entered into, and only allowed the claimants to secure restitutionary recovery on a quantum meruit basis for the value of the work done. The conclusion that no contract existed meant the defendants could not recover the damages for late performance as no terms had been agreed to that extent.

On quantum meruit, Goff noted that such a claim "straddles the boundaries of what we now call contract and restitution; so the mere framing of a claim as a quantum meruit claim, or a claim for a reasonable sum, does not assist in classifying the claim as contractual or quasi-contractual".

== See also ==
- English contract law
- RTS Flexible Systems Ltd v Molkerei Alois Müller GmbH & Co KG
