= Copsey v WWB Devon Clays Ltd =

2005 UK employment discrimination law case

Copsey v WWB Devon Clays Ltd [2005] EWCA Civ 932; [2005] IRLR 811 is a UK employment discrimination law case, concerning the right to freedom of religion under Article 9 of the European Convention on Human Rights.

== Facts ==
Mr Copsey was working in a sand quarry near King's Lynn. The work schedule was changed to keep pace with growing production. Although changes to the timetable were approved by most other workers in the plant, in consultation Mr Copsey was not happy, and he raised objection with four others. He did not want to work Sundays. Mr Copsey was offered another job where he would not have to work Sundays. He refused that. He was also offered a generous redundancy package instead. He still refused. He then said that the change, to make him work Sundays breached his fundamental human right to freedom of religion, as a Christian. This was protected under Art.9 ECHR. He was represented by Paul Diamond.

== Judgment ==
Mummery LJ in the Court of Appeal held that interference with this right was justified in the pursuit of a legitimate aim (to run an effective business). The employer had done everything to accommodate his needs, and so when he refused alternative offers and still refused to work, his dismissal was fair. He was not dismissed because he was a Christian believer, but simply because his religious requirements were not compatible with the job.

== See also ==
- UK employment discrimination law
- UK labour law
- Human Rights Act 1998
