= John Mummery =

British judge (born 1938)

Sir John Frank Mummery, DL (born 5 September 1938) is a former Lord Justice of Appeal and was President of the Investigatory Powers Tribunal and a member of the Court of Ecclesiastical Causes Reserved in the UK.

== Education ==
Mummery attended Dover Grammar School for Boys between 1949 and 1957 and then Pembroke College, Oxford.

== Legal career ==
Mummery was called to the bar (Gray's Inn) in 1964, becoming a bencher in 1985. He was a Junior Treasury Counsel (charity matters 1977–1981; chancery matters 1981–1989).

By the 1970s he was known as a copyright barrister, being consulted on matters such as Led Zeppelin's Black Mountain Side and its relation to Bert Jansch's version of Down by Blackwaterside. He also represented Apple Corps in efforts to stop the distribution of recordings of The Beatles in Hamburg.

He was appointed a recorder in 1989 before being appointed a High Court judge on 4 October the same year. He was assigned to the Chancery Division and received the customary knighthood. He was appointed a Lord Justice of Appeal on 1 October 1996. He served as President of the Employment Appeal Tribunal from 1993 to 1996, and was appointed President of the Security Services, Intelligence Services and Investigatory Powers Tribunals in 2000. He reached mandatory retirement on 5 September 2013. He was, from 2003, Chairman of the Trustees of the Royal Courts of Justice Citizens Advice Bureau.

From 2000 to 2003, he served as Chancellor of the Inns of Court, and was from 1996 to 2001 a governor of the Inns of Court School of Law. He has been a member of the Legal Advisory Commission of the Church of England since 1988 and Chairman of the Clergy Discipline Commission and Clergy Discipline Tribunal since 2004. He was a judge of the Court of Ecclesiastical Cases Reserved from 2006.

=== Judgments ===
Notable cases in which Mummery LJ has been involved include:

- Compaq Computer Ltd v. Abercorn Group Ltd. (1993) B.C.L.C. 602; Mummery stated the broad aim of a retention of title clause or a proceeds of sale clause in a contract, reflecting "the seller's aim ... to prevent the goods and the proceeds of sale of its goods from becoming part of the assets of an insolvent buyer, available to satisfy the claims of the general body of creditors".
- Clark v TDG Ltd (t/a Novacold Ltd) (1999)
- Re Barings plc (No 5) (1999)
- O'Neill v Phillips (1999)
- Hollicourt (Contracts) Ltd v Bank of Ireland (2000)
- Peskin v Anderson (2001)
- Copsey v WWB Devon Clays Ltd (2005)
- Fisher v Brooker / Onward Music Limited (2007) - A Whiter Shade of Pale authorship/royalties.
- Redfearn v Serco Ltd (2006)
- Collier v P & MJ Wright (Holdings) Ltd [2007] EWCA Civ 1329, [2008] 1 WLR 643 - English contract law concerning the doctrine of consideration and promissory estoppel in relation to "alteration promises".
- Luke v Stoke County Council (2007)
- Moore Stephens v Stone Rolls Ltd (2009)
- Revenue and Customs Commissioners v Annabel’s (Berkeley Square) Ltd (2009)
- Gisda Cyf v Barratt (2010)
- Link Lending v Bustard (2010)

== Honours ==
In 2017, he was awarded The Canterbury Cross for Services to the Church of England by the Archbishop of Canterbury.

== See also ==
- UK labour law
