= Dallah Real Estate and Tourism Holding Co v Ministry of Religious Affairs (Pakistan) =

Dallah Real Estate and Tourism Holding Co v Ministry of Religious Affairs (Pakistan) [2010] UKSC 46 was a 2010 judgment of the Supreme Court of the United Kingdom. The case concerned whether an arbitration agreement made by the International Chamber of Commerce tribunal in Paris could be enforced against the government of Pakistan in the United Kingdom.
