= R (Sainsbury's Supermarkets Ltd) v Wolverhampton City Council =

English land law court case

R (Sainsbury’s Ltd) v Wolverhampton CC
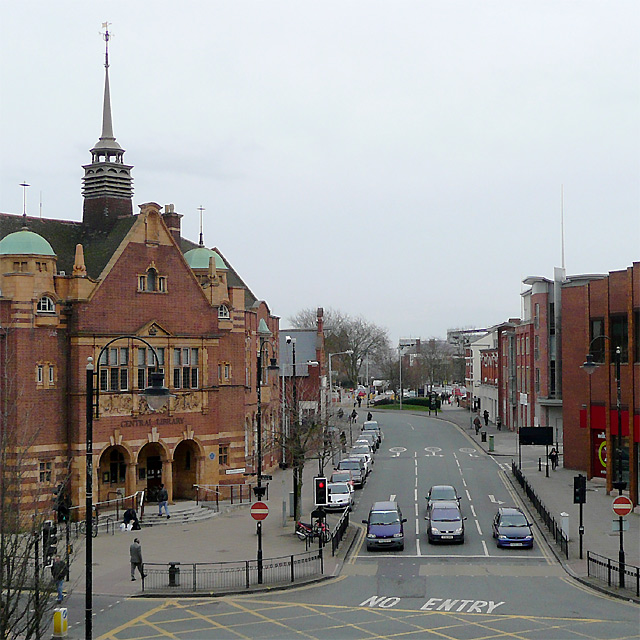
- Court: Supreme Court
- Full case name: R (on the application of Sainsbury's Supermarkets Ltd) v Wolverhampton City Council and another
- Decided: 2 May 2010 (case heard on 1 and 2 February 2010)
- Citation: [2010] UKSC 20

Case history
- Prior action: Appellant (owner of land proposed to be taken) lost in the Court of Appeal
- Subsequent action: none

Case opinions
- Held: a real (rather than a fanciful or remote) connection must be shown between any off-site benefits and the proposed redevelopment for which a compulsory purchase order is proposed.
- Decision by: Lord Collins; Lord Walker; Lady Hale; Lord Mance
- Dissent: Lord Phillips (President); Lord Hope (Deputy President); Lord Brown

Keywords
- Compulsory purchase in private to private acquisitions; public law; judicial review; irrationality and error of law; land law; competing competitors for a site; development plans of equal merit; off-site, largely unrelated contributions proposed

R (Sainsbury’s Supermarkets Ltd) v Wolverhampton CC [2010] UKSC 20 is an English public law case involving invalid considerations of (factors considered by) a local council in making a compulsory purchase order. Judicial review was available and upheld in this case on one or more of four available grounds, namely: error of law, irrationality, serious procedural irregularity, and action for an improper purpose.

== Facts ==
Wolverhampton City Council approved in principle a compulsory purchase order ("CPO") (under the Town and Country Planning Act 1990 section 226(1)(a)) of land owned by Sainsbury’s (its Raglan Street site) to facilitate instead a competing proposed development for the site by Tesco. The Council took into account Tesco's commitment to contribute financially to public assets at an off-site ("Royal Hospital") site with no proven real connection in issuing its approval.

Sainsbury’s contended to the court that it was illegitimate for Wolverhampton to have regard to Tesco’s monetary commitment involved with its regeneration of another site which bore no real connection with the site it wished to develop. Wolverhampton and the second respondent, Tesco, contended that such a factor was inherently legitimate in the light of the scope of the established factors in statute and precedent once a first-stage evaluation fairly came down in its favour excluding that factor, leaving a second-stage ultimate choice between two rival developers for the site and a need to look at other factors, and so should at that hypothetical second stage be a valid factor to consider.

== Judgment ==
Lord Collins gave the leading judgment. The court held that the council had taken into account an irrelevant factor in deciding whether to make a compulsory purchase order. It should not have considered the financial benefit from Tesco flowing into a site with "no real connection".

Lord Walker said the following.

81. [...] Economic regeneration brought about by urban redevelopment is no doubt a public good, but “private to private” acquisitions by compulsory purchase may also produce large profits for powerful business interests, and courts rightly regard them as particularly sensitive....

[...]

84. But the exercise of powers of compulsory acquisition, especially in a “private to private” acquisition, amounts to a serious invasion of the current owner’s proprietary rights. The local authority has a direct financial interest in the matter, and not merely a general interest (as local planning authority) in the betterment and well-being of its area. A stricter approach is therefore called for. As Lord Collins says in his conclusions at para 71 of his judgment, a real (rather than a fanciful or remote) connection must be shown between any off-site benefits and the proposed redevelopment for which a compulsory purchase order is proposed.

Lady Hale said the following.

92. It cannot be proper to deprive a person compulsorily of his land in order to secure something which will not be allowed to take place. Under the new version of section 226(1), the permissibility of some development (together with a reasonable prospect of its actually taking place) should be a sine qua non [i.e. an absolute] for compulsory acquisition in order to "facilitate" it. The question does not arise in this case, because we are agreed that the extraneous benefit to the Royal Hospital site would not be relevant to the grant of planning permission for this site, any more than it is relevant to the compulsory purchase decision.

Lord Mance agreed.

Lord Phillips, Lord Hope and Lord Brown dissented.

== See also ==
- English public law
- English land law
