= Bocardo SA v Star Energy UK Onshore Ltd =

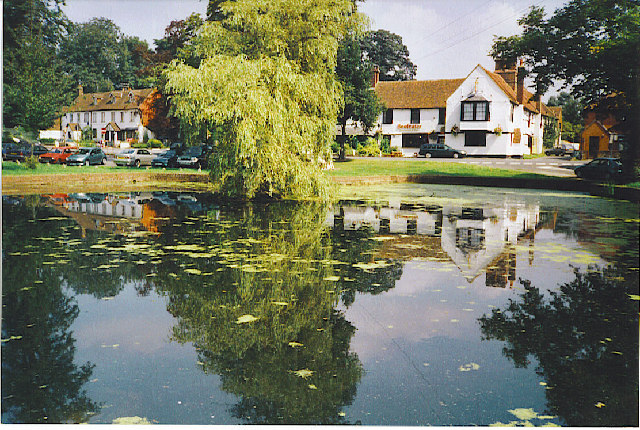
- Court: UK Supreme Court
- Citations: [2010] UKSC 35, [2011] 1 AC 380

Keywords
- Drilling, energy, trespass

Bocardo SA v Star Energy UK Onshore Ltd [2010] UKSC 35 is a UK enterprise law case, concerning oil and gas. It held a landowner also owned the strata and minerals, unless they conveyed it, in common law or statute, to someone else, so an oil company making wells 800 to 2,900 feet (240 to 880 m) below the surface was trespass, and had to pay compulsory purchase compensation under the Mines (Working Facilities and Support) Act 1966 s 8(2).

== Facts ==
Bocardo claimed Star Energy (now owned by IGas Energy) committed trespass, and that a licence under the Petroleum (Production) Act 1934 was no defence. Star Energy had a licence to search for, bore and get petroleum under the Petroleum (Production) Act 1934 section 2 at Palmers Wood Oil Field, at Godstone in Surrey. It got the licence in 1999, though it was originally issued by the Secretary of State for Energy in 1980 to Conoco. Its predecessors drilled three diagonal wells, with pipelines going between 800 and 2,900 feet (240 and 880 m) below land Bocardo owned. Star Energy had never sought Bocardo's permission.

== Judgment ==
=== High Court ===
Peter Smith J held that Bocardo's title extended to the substrata beneath the land's surface, and though the pipelines cause not damage, nor affected enjoyment, there was a trespass. Under the Mines (Working Facilities and Support) Act 1966 s 8(2) compensation would be based on ‘what would be fair and reasonable between a willing grantor and a willing grantee’. He awarded £621,180, calculated at 9% of the value of the oil extracted between July 2000 and December 2007, and continuing damages for trespass based on the same.

=== Court of Appeal ===
The Court of Appeal reduced compensation to £1,000, on the basis that the trespass was actionable but technical.

=== Supreme Court ===
The Supreme Court held by a majority of three to two that the Court of Appeal had been correct. Bocardo did own the ground, and was entitled to claim for trespass by the wells. Star Energy had no defence in trespass under PPA 1934 s 10(3) (re-enacted in PA 1998 s 9(2). It was irrelevant if a landowner did not make use of the ground. But, for assessing damages, the right measure was the amount of compensation payable under the Mines (Working Facilities and Support) Act 1966. This operated to prevent the powerful bargaining position of a landowner to control access to a potentially valuable oilfield.

Lord Hope, giving the first and dissenting judgment, said a landowner did own the ground beneath, including minerals, unless there was a conveyance or statute, as in Mitchell [1914] 1 Ch 438. There had to be a logical limit, where pressure and temperature to the Earth's core made ownership so absurd as to be not worth arguing about, but the wells were not that deep.

44. In my opinion the sum of £621,180 plus interest that he awarded as damages was excessive, as it was not restricted to the amount that was attributable to the key value of the land. I would not be averse to using his figure of 9%, so long as it was applied only to the extra amount of oil and gas that was obtained by drilling into the apex of the reservoir. If this had been a live issue it would have been necessary to remit the case to the High Court so that it could assess the amount of the extra value and complete the exercise of calculating, on this much more limited basis, the amount of the damages.

Lord Walker agreed on the trespass issue, but said the Court of Appeal was right on damages.

Lord Brown said the right compensation was small. In his view by the PPA 1934, giving the Crown exclusive rights:

90. … Parliament was at one and the same time extinguishing whatever pre-existing key value Bocardo's land might be thought to have had in the open market and creating a new world in which only the Crown and its licencees had any interest in accessing the oilfield and in which they had been empowered to do so (to turn the key if one wants to persist in the metaphor) compulsorily and thus on terms subject to the Pointe Gourde approach to compensation.

Lord Collins agreed with Lord Hope on the principles and Lord Brown on quantum.

Lord Clarke dissented.

171. ‘the correct approach would be to assess a fair and reasonable amount to reflect the key value of the wayleave, in the words of section 8(2), as between a willing grantor and a willing grantee, and to add 10% in accordance with the statute. However, as I see it, that key value would not reflect the value of the access to all the oil in the reservoir. Its particular value was to provide access to the apex (or attic) oil. I am not, at least at present, persuaded that that was the basis upon which the figure was arrived at by the judge. In these circumstances, if this were a live issue, I would remit it to the High Court for determination.

== See also ==
- United Kingdom enterprise law
