= Fletcher Challenge Energy Ltd v Electricity Corp of New Zealand Ltd =

Fletcher Challenge Energy Ltd v Electricity Corporation of New Zealand Ltd
- Court: Court of Appeal of New Zealand
- Full case name: ELECTRICITY CORPORATION OF NEW ZEALAND LIMITED Appellant v FLETCHER CHALLENGE ENERGY LIMITED Respondent
- Decided: 10 October 2001
- Citation: [2002] 2 NZLR 433
- Transcript: Court of Appeal judgment

Court membership
- Judges sitting: Richardson J, Thomas J, Keith, Blanchard J, McGrath J

Fletcher Challenge Energy Ltd v Electricity Corporation of New Zealand Ltd [2002] 2 NZLR 433 regarding certainty in contract formation.

== Background ==
Western Mining Corporation was selling its 40% stake in the Kupe gas field, for which Fletcher Challenge Energy and Electricity Corporation were interested in buying. ECNZ was particularly interested as it was planning to convert the Huntly power station with gas.

Both companies entered into an agreement that if one of them purchased the WMC share, that they would split the gas between them.

The contract was called a Heads of Agreement (HoA), but it left several matters unresolved, "to use all reasonable endeavors to agree to a full sale and purchase agreement within 3 months of the date of this agreement".

Later however, after a substantial drop in power prices, ECNZ decided to not convert the power plant.

As a result, FCE applied successfully to the High Court to make ECNZ enter into an agreement with them. ECNZ defended the issue on the basis that there was lack of certainty making the contract unenforceable.

== Held ==
The court of appeal ruled that there was not a legally binding contract
