= Raymond Phillips (judge) =

Sir John Raymond Phillips MC (20 November 1915 – 2 August 1982) was a British barrister and judge. He was a High Court judge (Queen's Bench Division) from 1971 until his death, as well as the first President of the Employment Appeal Tribunal from 1976 to 1978.

== Life ==
Philips was born outside Cardiff, the oldest surviving son of David Rupert and Amy Isabel Phillips, of Radyr, Glamorgan. He was educated at Rugby School and Balliol College, Oxford (MA, BCL). He was called to the Bar by Gray's Inn, where he was an Arden Scholar, in 1939 and then joined the Wales and Chester Circuit. During the Second World War, he served in the Royal Artillery from 1940 to 1945, in the 3rd Medium Regiment. He was mentioned in despatches, and received the Military Cross in 1945.

Phillips returned to the Bar in 1946, and specialized in revenue cases. He was Junior Counsel to the Inland Revenue (Rating Valuation) from 1958 to 1963 and Junior Counsel to the Inland Revenue (Common Law) from 1963 until 1968, when he became a Queen's Counsel. From 1964 to 1971, he was Deputy Chairman of the Glamorgan Quarter Sessions.

In 1971, Phillips was appointed a Justice of the High Court, receiving the customary knighthood; he was assigned to the Queen's Bench Division. From 1976 to 1978, he was the first President of the Employment Appeal Tribunal. He was also a Member of the Parole Board from 1975 to 1977, serving as vice-chairman in 1976. He was Presiding Judge of the Wales and Chester Circuit from 1980 to 1981. He died in Teddington on 2 August 1982.
