= RTS Flexible Systems Ltd v Molkerei Alois Müller GmbH & Co KG =

RTS Flexible Systems Ltd v Molkerei Alois Muller GmbH & Co KG
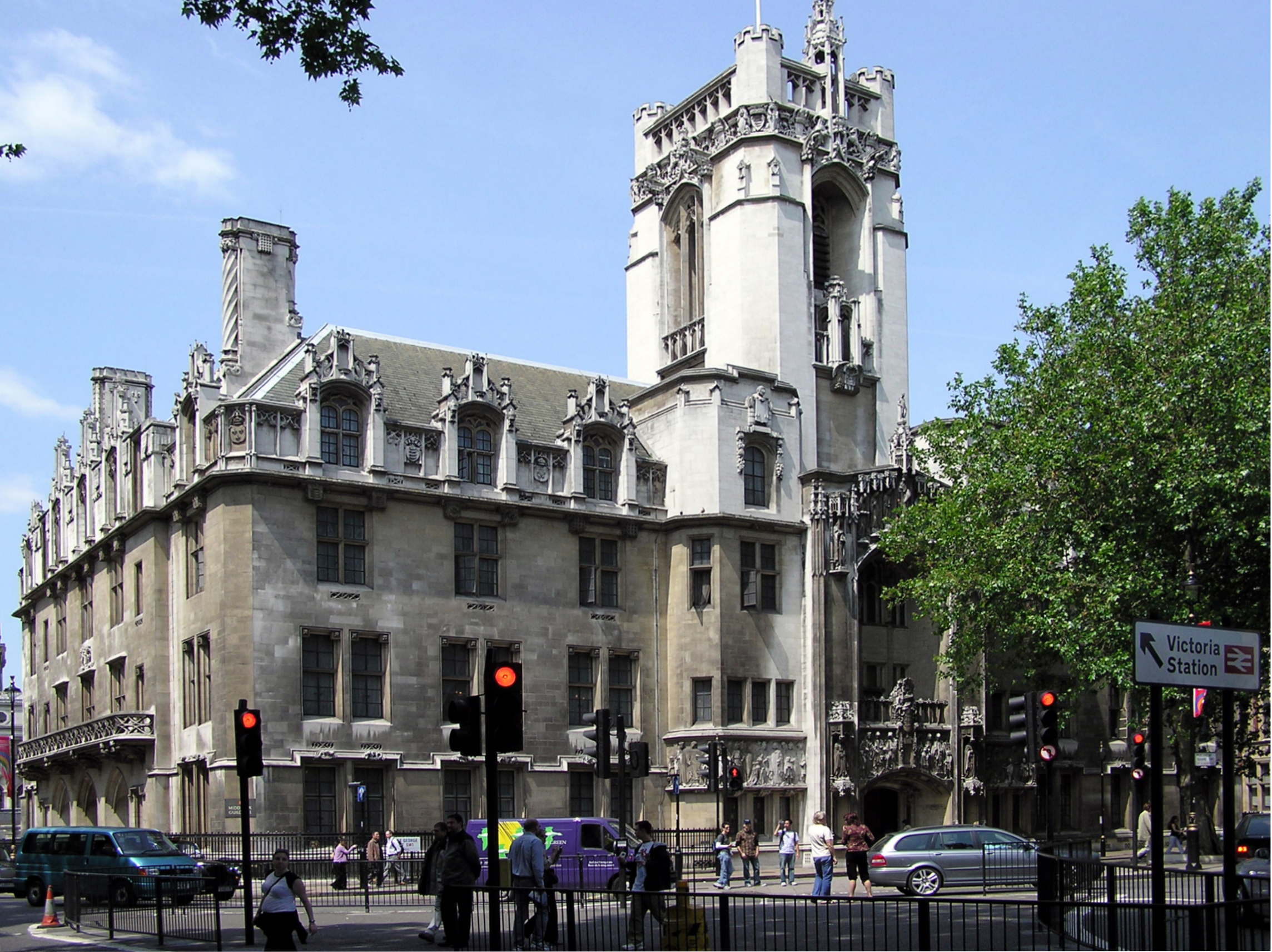
- Court: Supreme Court
- Decided: 10 March 2010
- Citations: [2010] UKSC 14 [2010] 1 WLR 753
- Transcript: BAILII

Case history
- Prior action: [2009] EWCA Civ 26

Court membership
- Judges sitting: Lord Phillips; Lord Mance; Lord Collins; Lord Kerr; Lord Clarke

Case opinions
- Lord Clarke

Keywords
- Contract, agreement, restitution

RTS Flexible Systems Limited v Molkerei Alois Müller GmbH [2010] UKSC 14 is an English contract law case, concerning how it will be judged whether an agreement is reached.

== Facts ==
Molkerei was buying automated packaging machinery, to come from and be installed by RTS. They made a letter of intent, providing for the whole contract price, contemplating full contract terms would be based on MF/1 terms, i.e. using the Institute of Engineering and Technology's model form of contract for the design, supply and installation of electrical, electronic and mechanical plant. On 5 July 2005, a draft final contract was produced, which stated that it would not be effective until executed and exchanged. Work began anyway. On 25 August terms were varied. There was a dispute about which terms the contract was on.

The Judge held that after the letter of intent expired, they entered a contract for RTS to do the work for an agreed price, but that did not include the final draft version of the MF/1 terms. The Court of Appeal held no contract arose after the letter of intent expiry at all. Molkerei argued there was a contract of expiry, not on the MF/1 terms, and RTS argued there was no contract, or if there was it was on MF/1 terms, as amended through the negotiations.

== Judgment ==
Lord Clarke held that it was too dogmatic to say the "subject to contract" terms would be the ones that were binding, because it always depends on the circumstances. They had reached a binding agreement on or about 25 August on the terms agreed on or before 5 July as subsequently varied, and that the agreement was not subject to contract. This case illustrated the perils of beginning work without a precise basis for payment.

45. The general principles are not in doubt. Whether there is a binding contract between the parties and, if so, upon what terms depends upon what they have agreed. It depends not upon their subjective state of mind, but upon a consideration of what was communicated between them by words or conduct, and whether that leads objectively to a conclusion that they intended to create legal relations and had agreed upon all the terms which they regarded or the law requires as essential for the formation of legally binding relations. Even if certain terms of economic or other significance to the parties have not been finalised, an objective appraisal of their words and conduct may lead to the conclusion that they did not intend agreement of such terms to be a pre-condition to a concluded and legally binding agreement.

46. The problems that have arisen in this case are not uncommon, and fall under two heads. Both heads arise out of the parties agreeing that the work should proceed before the formal written contract was executed in accordance with the parties' common understanding. The first concerns the effect of the parties' understanding (here reflected in clause 48 of the draft written contract) that the contract would "not become effective until each party has executed a counterpart and exchanged it with the other" – which never occurred. Is that fatal to a conclusion that the work done was covered by a contract? The second frequently arises in such circumstances and is this. Leaving aside the implications of the parties' failure to execute and exchange any agreement in written form, were the parties agreed upon all the terms which they objectively regarded or the law required as essential for the formation of legally binding relations? Here, in particular, this relates to the terms on which the work was being carried out. What, if any, price or remuneration was agreed and what were the rights and obligations of the contractor or supplier?

47. We agree with Mr Catchpole's submission that, in a case where a contract is being negotiated subject to contract and work begins before the formal contract is executed, it cannot be said that there will always or even usually be a contract on the terms that were agreed subject to contract. That would be too simplistic and dogmatic an approach. The court should not impose binding contracts on the parties which they have not reached. All will depend upon the circumstances. This can be seen from a contrast between the approach of Steyn LJ in the Percy Trentham case, which was relied upon by the judge, and that of Robert Goff J in British Steel Corporation v Cleveland Bridge and Engineering Co Ltd [1984] 1 All ER 504, to which the judge was not referred but which was relied upon in and by the Court of Appeal.

48. These principles apply to all contracts, including both sales contracts and construction contracts, and are clearly stated in Pagnan SPA v Feed Products Ltd [1987] 2 Lloyd's Rep 601, both by Bingham J at first instance and by the Court of Appeal. In Pagnan it was held that, although certain terms of economic significance to the parties were not agreed, neither party intended agreement of those terms to be a precondition to a concluded agreement. The parties regarded them as relatively minor details which could be sorted out without difficulty once a bargain was struck. The parties agreed to bind themselves to agreed terms, leaving certain subsidiary and legally inessential terms to be decided later.

49. In his judgment in the Court of Appeal in Pagnan Lloyd LJ (with whom O'Connor and Stocker LJJ agreed) summarised the relevant principles in this way at page 619:

"(1) In order to determine whether a contract has been concluded in the course of correspondence, one must first look to the correspondence as a whole...

(2) Even if the parties have reached agreement on all the terms of the proposed contract, nevertheless they may intend that the contract shall not become binding until some further condition has been fulfilled. That is the ordinary 'subject to contract' case.

(3) Alternatively, they may intend that the contract shall not become binding until some further term or terms have been agreed...

(4) Conversely, the parties may intend to be bound forthwith even though there are further terms still to be agreed or some further formality to be fulfilled...

(5) If the parties fail to reach agreement on such further terms, the existing contract is not invalidated unless the failure to reach agreement on such further terms renders the contract as a whole unworkable or void for uncertainty

(6) It is sometimes said that the parties must agree on the essential terms and it is only matters of detail which can be left over. This may be misleading, since the word 'essential' in that context is ambiguous. If by 'essential' one means a term without which the contract cannot be enforced then the statement is true: the law cannot enforce an incomplete contract. If by 'essential' one means a term which the parties have agreed to be essential for the formation of a binding contract, then the statement is tautologous. If by 'essential' one means only a term which the Court regards as important as opposed to a term which the Court regards as less important or a matter of detail, the statement is untrue. It is for the parties to decide whether they wish to be bound and if so, by what terms, whether important or unimportant. It is the parties who are, in the memorable phrase coined by the Judge [at page 611] 'the masters of their contractual fate'. Of course the more important the term is the less likely it is that the parties will have left it for future decision. But there is no legal obstacle which stands in the way of the parties agreeing to be bound now while deferring important matters to be agreed later. It happens every day when parties enter into so-called 'heads of agreement'.

The same principles apply where, as here, one is considering whether a contract was concluded in correspondence as well as by oral communications and conduct.

50. Before the judge much attention was paid to the Percy Trentham case, where, as Steyn LJ put it at page 26, the case for Trentham (the main contractor) was that the sub-contracts came into existence, not simply from an exchange of contracts, but partly by reason of written exchanges, partly by oral discussions and partly by performance of the transactions. In the passage from the judgment of Steyn LJ at page 27 quoted by the judge at para 66 he identified these four particular matters which he regarded as of importance. (1) English law generally adopts an objective theory of contract formation, ignoring the subjective expectations and the unexpressed mental reservations of the parties. Instead the governing criterion is the reasonable expectations of honest sensible businessmen. (2) Contracts may come into existence, not as a result of offer and acceptance, but during and as a result of performance. (3) The fact that the transaction is executed rather than executory can be very relevant. The fact that the transaction was performed on both sides will often make it unrealistic to argue that there was no intention to enter into legal relations and difficult to submit that the contract is void for vagueness or uncertainty. Specifically, the fact that the transaction is executed makes it easier to imply a term resolving any uncertainty, or, alternatively, it may make it possible to treat a matter not finalised in negotiations as inessential. This may be so in both fully executed and partly executed transactions. (4) If a contract only comes into existence during and as a result of performance it will frequently be possible to hold that the contract impliedly and retrospectively covers pre-contractual performance.

51. By contrast, in the Court of Appeal much attention was paid to the decision of Robert Goff J in the British Steel case, which had not been cited to the judge. At para 51 Waller LJ said that the factors which influenced Robert Goff J to conclude in that case that there was no binding contract apply with equal force to the factual matrix here. He thought (para 59) that, if the judge had had Robert Goff J's judgment cited to him (and/or if the no contract point had been fully developed before him) the judge would not have reached the conclusion he did.

52. The particular passage in Robert Goff J's judgment (starting at page 510G) on which Waller LJ relied reads as follows:

"The real difficulty is to be found in the factual matrix of the transaction, and in particular the fact that the work was being done pending a formal sub-contract the terms of which were still in a state of negotiation. It is, of course, a notorious fact that, when a contract is made for the supply of goods on a scale and in circumstances such as the present, it will in all probability be subject to standard terms, usually the standard terms of the supplier. Such standard terms will frequently legislate, not only for the liability of the seller for defects, but also for the damages (if any) for which the seller will be liable in the event not only of defects in the goods but also of late delivery. It is a commonplace that a seller of goods may exclude liability for consequential loss, and may agree liquidated damages for delay. In the present case, an unresolved dispute broke out between the parties on the question whether CBE's or BSC's standard terms were to apply, the former providing no limit to the seller's liability for delay and the latter excluding such liability altogether. Accordingly, when, in a case such as the present, the parties are still in a state of negotiation, it is impossible to predicate what liability (if any) will be assumed by the seller for, eg defective goods or late delivery, if a formal contract should be entered into. In these circumstances, if the buyer asks the seller to commence work 'pending' the parties entering into a formal contract, it is difficult to infer from the [seller] acting on that request that he is assuming any responsibility for his performance, except such responsibility as will rest on him under the terms of the contract which both parties confidently anticipate they will shortly enter into. It would be an extraordinary result if, by acting on such a request in such circumstances, the [seller] were to assume an unlimited liability for his contractual performance, when he would never assume such liability under any contract which he entered into."

(Waller LJ rightly put 'seller' in parentheses since, although the report reads 'buyer', Robert Goff J must have meant 'seller'.)

53. In that passage Robert Goff J recognised that contracts for the supply of goods on a significant scale will in all probability be subject to standard terms, which will frequently legislate, not only for the liability of the seller for defects, but also for the damages (if any) for which the seller will be liable in the event not only of defects in the goods but also of late delivery. Thus a seller may exclude liability for consequential loss, and may agree liquidated damages for delay. In the British Steel case itself there was an unresolved dispute as to whose standard terms were to apply. One set of terms provided no limit to the seller's liability for delay and the other excluded such liability altogether. We can understand why, in such a case, if the buyer asks the seller to commence work 'pending' the parties entering into a formal contract, it is difficult to infer from the seller acting on that request that he is assuming any responsibility for his performance, "except such responsibility as will rest on him under the terms of the contract which both parties confidently anticipate they will shortly enter into". By the last words, Robert Goff J was not suggesting that there was, in the case before him, any contract governing the performance rendered, merely that the parties had anticipated (wrongly in the event) that there would be.

54. There is said to be a conflict between the approach of Steyn LJ in the Percy Trentham case and that of Robert Goff J in the British Steel case. We do not agree. Each case depends upon its own facts. We do not understand Steyn LJ to be saying that it follows from the fact that the work was performed that the parties must have entered into a contract. On the other hand, it is plainly a very relevant factor pointing in that direction. Whether the court will hold that a binding contract was made depends upon all the circumstances of the case, of which that is but one. The decision in the British Steel case was simply one on the other side of the line. Robert Goff J was struck by the likelihood that parties would agree detailed provisions for matters such as liability for defects and concluded on the facts that no binding agreement had been reached. By contrast, in Pagnan Bingham J and the Court of Appeal reached a different conclusion, albeit in a case of sale not construction.

55. We note in passing that the Percy Trentham case was not a 'subject to contract' or 'subject to written contract' type of case. Nor was Pagnan, whereas part of the reasoning in the British Steel case in the passage quoted above was that the negotiations were throughout conducted on the basis that, when reached, the agreement would be incorporated in a formal contract. So too was the reasoning of the Court of Appeal in Galliard Homes Ltd v J Jarvis & Sons Ltd (1999) 71 Con LR 219. In our judgment, in such a case, the question is whether the parties have nevertheless agreed to enter into contractual relations on particular terms notwithstanding their earlier understanding or agreement. Thus, in the Galliard Homes case Lindsay J, giving the only substantive judgment in the Court of Appeal, which also comprised Evans and Schiemann LJJ, at page 236 quoted with approval the statement in Megarry & Wade, The Law of Real Property, 5th ed (1984) at pages 568-9 that it is possible for an agreement 'subject to contract' or 'subject to written contract' to become legally binding if the parties later agree to waive that condition, for they are in effect making a firm contract by reference to the terms of the earlier agreement. Put another way, they are waiving the 'subject to [written] contract' term or understanding.

== See also ==
- UK labour law
