= Employment tribunal =

Tribunal public bodies in England and Wales and Scotland

Employment Tribunals (England and Wales)
- Royal coat of arms of the United Kingdom as used in England and Wales
- Established: 1964 (as Industrial Tribunals) 1998 (as Employment Tribunals)
- Jurisdiction: England and Wales
- Authorised by: Industrial Training Act 1964 Employment Rights (Dispute Resolution) Act 1998
- Appeals to: Employment Appeal Tribunal
- Website: www.judiciary.uk

President of Employment Tribunals (England and Wales)
- Currently: Barry Clarke

Employment Tribunals (Scotland)
- Royal coat of arms of the United Kingdom as used in Scotland
- Established: 1964 (as Industrial Tribunals) 1998 (as Employment Tribunals)
- Jurisdiction: Scotland
- Authorised by: Industrial Training Act 1964 Employment Rights (Dispute Resolution) Act 1998
- Appeals to: Employment Appeal Tribunal
- Website: www.judiciary.uk

President of Employment Tribunals (Scotland)
- Currently: Susan Walker

Employment tribunals are tribunal public bodies in both England and Wales and Scotland that have statutory jurisdiction to hear disputes between employers and employees.

The most common disputes are concerned with unfair dismissal, redundancy payments and employment discrimination.

The tribunals are part of the UK tribunals system, administered by the HM Courts and Tribunals Service, an executive agency of the Ministry of Justice.

== History ==
Employment tribunals were created as industrial tribunals by the Industrial Training Act 1964. Industrial tribunals were judicial bodies consisting of a lawyer, who was the chairman, an individual nominated by an employer association, and another by the Trades Union Congress (TUC) or by a TUC-affiliated union. These independent panels heard and made legally binding rulings in relation to employment law disputes.

Under the Employment Rights (Dispute Resolution) Act 1998, their name was changed to employment tribunals from 1 August 1998. Employment tribunals continue to perform the same function as the industrial tribunals.

== Jurisdiction and remit ==
=== Legal systems ===
There are separate employment tribunals for Scotland and for England and Wales, because there are significant differences between Scots civil law and English civil law.

A claim may not be presented in Scotland for proceedings in England and Wales, and vice versa, but it is possible to transfer proceedings between the two jurisdictions in certain circumstances.

=== Statutory remit ===
Employment tribunals may hear claims brought within three months for issues related to "statutory" breaches only. The statutory breaches are listed below:

Statute	Possible breaches
Employment Rights Act 1996	Unfair dismissal; Unlawful wage deductions or required payments to employers; Disputes regarding written particulars of employment; Disputes regarding itemised pay statements; Breach of the National Minimum Wage; Disputes regarding time off for public duty (including jury service); Maternity, paternity and adoption issues: pay and leave
Equality Act 2010	Claims of breach of equality clauses; Failure to provide equality of terms; When a case is referred by another court
Trade Union and Labour Relations (Consolidation) Act 1992	Unfair dismissal and other actions for reasons related to trade union membership or participation in industrial action; Offering of inducements to not join a trade union or opt-out from collective bargaining agreements; Blacklisting; Issues related to taking time off for union duties; Failure to consult a recognised union or representative organisation over a proposed redundancy or over changes to training; Disputes over union membership including disciplinary action or expulsion of members

Action can also be brought under a number of other statutes:

- the Working Time Regulations for issues related to rest breaks, rest periods, detriments for failure to work in excess of the maximum time etc.
- the National Minimum Wage Act 1998
- the Employment Relations Act 1999, for failing to allow workers to be accompanied at disciplinary or grievance hearings
- the Transfer of Undertakings (Protection of Employment) Regulations 2006

== Procedure ==
Employment tribunals are constituted and operate according to statutory rules issued by the UK Secretary of State. These rules, known as the Employment Tribunals Rules of Procedure, set out the Tribunals' main objectives and procedures, and matters such as time limits for making a claim, and dealing with requests for reviews.

Since 2004, the same rules of procedure have governed both England and Wales and Scotland, with references to the appropriate civil law nomenclature differences between them.

The rules for appeals are governed by the separate Rules of the Employment Appeal Tribunal.

=== Formality ===
Tribunals are intended to be more informal than courts. Claims are brought and defended by people with professional legal representation, lay representation (eg by a friend or relative), or no representation at all. People are free to represent themselves if they wish, and they may be accompanied if they wish.

The rules of procedure used by Employment Tribunals are less formal than the rules followed in the courts, and are designed to give flexibility in ensuring that each case is determined fairly and justly. Where appropriate, Employment Tribunals can adjust their procedures to ensure effective participation by people with a disability or a vulnerability.

There is no special court dress or complex civil procedure rules as at the County Court.

=== Reasons for decisions ===
The overriding rule on the provision of reasons for a tribunal's decision is set out in these terms:

The decision of a Tribunal shall be recorded in a document signed by the Chairman which shall contain the reasons for the decision.

Successive rulings in UCATT v Brain [1981] I.C.R. 542, Alexander Machinery (Dudley) Ltd v Crabtree [1974] I.C.R. 120, Varndell v Kearney & Trecker Marwin Ltd. [1983 I.C.R. 683] and Martin v Glynwed Distribution provide clarification of the rule and its application in the Industrial and Employment Tribunals. In Martin it was noted that an explanation of the facts is useful but not obligatory, but "as far as the questions of law are concerned, the reasons should show expressly or by implication what were the questions to which the industrial tribunal addressed its mind and why it reached the conclusions which it did".

=== Reconsideration and appeals ===
The Rules of Procedure make provision for a judgment to be reconsidered if it is in the interests of justice to do so, where an application is made in writing within 14 days of the date of the written Judgment. Upon reconsideration a judgment may be confirmed, varied (ie changed) or revoked.

Applications with no reasonable prospect of success are rejected on paper. Those with a reasonable prospect are generally determined at a reconsideration hearing.

Failing this, decisions can be appealed to the Employment Appeal Tribunal.

== Judiciary ==
An Employment Tribunal hearing will always be chaired by a judge (known as an Employment Judge). The lead Employment Judge in their jurisdiction is called the President of Employment Tribunals. The current Presidents are:

- President of Employment Tribunals (England and Wales) - Barry Clarke
- President of Employment Tribunals (Scotland) - Susan Walker

The Employment Judge may decide a case with two lay individuals known as non-legal members. Depending on the type of the hearing, there will also be a clerk present to assist with administration.

== Controversies ==
=== Prevalence of unpaid awards ===
The Taylor Review referred to "widespread concerns about the number of employment tribunal awards that go unpaid" and reported that government-commissioned research undertaken in 2013 had shown that, following enforcement action taken by an individual, 34% of employment tribunal awards in England and Wales and 46% in Scotland remained unpaid. In December 2018 the Department for Business, Energy and Industrial Strategy introduced a "naming scheme" to exert reputational pressure on employers who fail to pay awards. Only awards of £200 or more are affected by the scheme. However, in October 2025, an investigation found that three quarters of people who used the scheme to enforce tribunal awards and settlements did not get their money, They asked for help to recover awards and legally binding settlements totalling more than £46 million. Nearly £36 million of that has gone unpaid. The government had issued fines worth £9.6m to companies that failed to pay tribunal awards, but only collected £95,000 – less than 1%.

=== Fees ===
In July 2013 the system was changed so that a fee of £160 or £250 must be paid by the individual when starting their employment tribunal and a further payment of £230 or £950 for the actual hearing.

This led to a sharp decline in the number of tribunal cases in the following 12 months.

In July 2017, the Supreme Court ruled that the employment tribunal fees were unlawful. The Ministry of Justice subsequently announced it would cease to charge the fees and refund those already paid.

In January 2024, the Ministry of Justice launched a consultation on the reintroduction of fees for both the employment tribunal and the employment appeal tribunal. It proposed a single fee of £55 to issue a claim at the employment tribunal, but no hearing fee. Similarly, an appellant at the employment appeal tribunal would incur a £55 fee, and no hearing fee. The consultation referred to an intended implementation date of November 2024.

== Statistics ==
The Employment Tribunals Service published its Annual Report and Accounts for 2005-06 in July 2006 which included these key points:

- In 2005/2006, there were 115,039 claims accepted, compared with 86,181 in 2004/2005 and 115,042 in 2003/2004.
- 18% of claims were successful at a full hearing in 2005/2006; the remainder were either settled, withdrawn, unsuccessful or otherwise disposed of.
- The median award for unfair dismissal was £4,228; the average award was £8,679.
- The median award for discrimination was between £5,546 and £9,021 (depending on the type of discrimination).
- Costs were awarded against claimants in 148 cases, and against respondents in 432 cases. The median costs award was £1,136.
- 867 Employment Tribunal decisions were appealed to the Employment Appeal Tribunal. Of those, 191 were withdrawn, 378 were dismissed and the remaining 298 appeals were allowed.

== See also ==
- Labour Tribunal (Hong Kong)
