= Robert Walker, Baron Walker of Gestingthorpe =

British judge (1938–2023)

The Right Honourable The Lord Walker of Gestingthorpe GBS PC
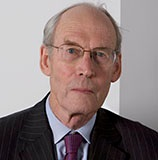

Justice of the Supreme Court of the United Kingdom (Note: Lord of Appeal in Ordinary until 30 September 2009)
- In office 1 October 2002 – 17 March 2013
- Nominated by: Jack Straw
- Appointed by: Elizabeth II
- Preceded by: The Lord Slynn of Hadley
- Succeeded by: Lord Toulson

Member of the House of Lords
- Lord Temporal
- Lord of Appeal in Ordinary; 1 October 2002 – 17 March 2021

Lord Justice of Appeal
- In office 1997–2002

High Court Judge
- In office 1994–1997

Non-Permanent Judge of the Court of Final Appeal of Hong Kong
- In office 1 March 2009 – 16 November 2023
- Appointed by: Donald Tsang

Personal details
- Born: Robert Walker; 17 March 1938
- Died: 16 November 2023 (aged 85)
- Spouse: Suzanne Diana Leggi (m. 1962)
- Education: Trinity College, Cambridge
- Occupation: Judge
- Profession: Barrister

Chinese name
- Chinese: 華學佳
Transcriptions
Yue: Cantonese
- Yale Romanization: Wàh Hohk Gāai
- Jyutping: Waa^{4} Hok^{6} Gaai^{1}

Robert Walker, Baron Walker of Gestingthorpe, GBS, PC (17 March 1938 – 16 November 2023) was a British barrister and justice of the Supreme Court of the United Kingdom. He also served as a non-permanent judge of the Hong Kong Court of Final Appeal between 2009 and 2023.

Walker sat in the House of Lords as a crossbencher until his retirement from the House on 17 March 2021.

== Early life and non-judicial career ==
Robert Walker was born on 17 March 1938, as the son of Ronald Robert Antony Walker by his wife Mary Helen Welsh. He was educated at Downside School and Trinity College, Cambridge from where he graduated in 1959 with a Bachelor of Arts degree in Classics and Law. He was called to the bar at Lincoln's Inn in 1960 and became a Queen's Counsel in 1982.

In 2010 he was the Treasurer of Lincoln's Inn.

Walker was an Honorary Fellow of Trinity College, Cambridge.

Lord Walker of Gestingthorpe served on the Honorary Editorial Board of the Warwick Student Law Review from its inception in 2010.

== Judicial career ==
In 1994, Walker was appointed a High Court Judge in the Chancery Division, and as is customary was then made a Knight Bachelor, before appointment as a Lord Justice of Appeal in 1997. He succeeded Lord Slynn of Hadley as a Lord of Appeal in Ordinary in 2002 and was created a Life Peer as Baron Walker of Gestingthorpe, of Gestingthorpe in the County of Essex. He and nine other Lords of Appeal in Ordinary became Justices of the Supreme Court of the United Kingdom upon its inauguration on 1 October 2009. Walker also became a non-permanent judge for the Court of Final Appeal in Hong Kong in March of the same year. He was awarded the Gold Bauhinia Star for his services to the judiciary in Hong Kong by the Hong Kong government in 2019. He stayed on this position until his death in 2023.

== Personal life ==
Lord Walker of Gestingthorpe married Suzanne Diana Leggi in 1962. They had one son (Robert, born 1963) and three daughters (Penelope Mary, born 1966; Julian Diana, born 1968; and Henrietta Solveig, born 1972). He died on 16 November 2023, at the age of 85.

== Notable judgments ==
- Re A (Children) (Conjoined Twins: Surgical Separation) [2001] Fam 147
- Gillett v Holt [2000] 3 WLR 815
- Re Spectrum Plus Ltd [2005] UKHL 41
- Moore Stephens v Stone Rolls Ltd [2009] UKHL 39
- HJ and HT v Home Secretary [2010] UKSC 31
- Futter & Anor v HMRC; Pitt & Anor v HMRC [2013] UKSC 26
- Moulin Global Eyecare Trading Ltd v Commissioner of Inland Revenue FACV 5/2013, (2014) 17 HKCFAR 218
- Chang Wa Shan v Esther Chan Pui Kwan FACV 2/2018, (2018) 21 HKCFAR 370

== Arms ==
Coat of arms of Robert Walker, Baron Walker of Gestingthorpe
Crest Out flames Or a dragon’s head sable gorged with an ancient crown Or. Torse Argent and Sable. Escutcheon Argent on a chevron between three dragons’ heads couped sable three crescents Or. Supporters On either side an ostrich reguardant Proper the head neck legs and grasping in the beak an ear of wheat slipped and leaved Or. Motto Mentem Mortalia Tangunt

== Notes ==
Legal offices
Preceded by None	Non-Permanent Judge of the Court of Final Appeal of Hong Kong; 2009–2023	Succeeded by None
