= Employment Appeal Tribunal =

Tribunal and superior court of record in England and Wales, and Scotland

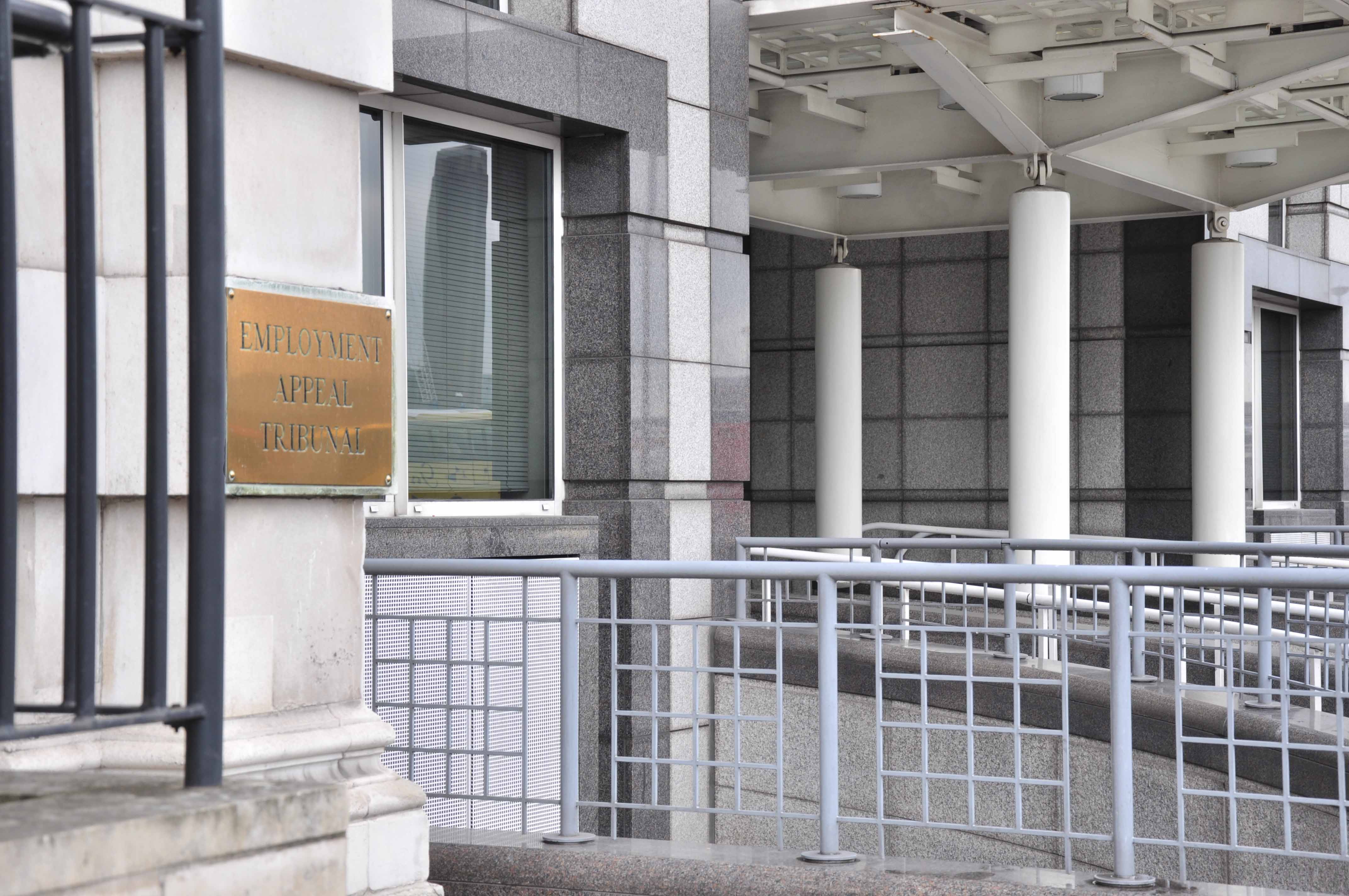
Building exterior

The Employment Appeal Tribunal is a tribunal in England and Wales and Scotland, and is a superior court of record. Its primary role is to hear appeals from Employment Tribunals in England, Scotland and Wales. It also hears appeals from decisions of the Certification Officer and the Central Arbitration Committee and has original jurisdiction over certain industrial relations issues.

The tribunal may sit anywhere in Great Britain, although it is required to have an office in London. It is part of the UK tribunals system, under the administration of His Majesty's Courts and Tribunals Service. The tribunal may not make a declaration of incompatibility under the Human Rights Act 1998.

== Membership ==
There are two classes of members of the tribunal:

- Nominated members, who are appointed from English and Welsh circuit judges, judges of the High Court and the Court of Appeal as well as at least one judge from the Court of Session.
- Appointed members, who must have special knowledge or experience of industrial relations, appointed either as representatives of:
  - Employers; or
  - Workers.

Members are nominated or appointed by the Lord Chief Justice. One of the nominated judges is selected as the president. The usual term of office for president is three years. The current president is Lord Fairley who replaced Dame Jennifer Eady on 1 February 2025.

== Procedure ==
The tribunal is governed by the Employment Appeal Tribunal Rules 1993, as amended in 1996, 2001, 2004 and 2005, and further by its Practice Direction. Parties are expected to understand and apply these rules.

== Jurisdiction ==
The tribunal has jurisdiction to consider appeals only on questions of law, including perversity.

== Appeals from the Employment Appeals Tribunal ==
A party dissatisfied with a decision of the Employment Appeal Tribunal may apply to the tribunal requesting a review of its own decision. The tribunal may also review its decision of its own motion. Decisions can be reviewed where an error is relatively minor, for example a clerical error. Where a party believes the tribunal has misapplied the law or acted perversely, the review process is inappropriate and the party may appeal to the Court of Appeal (England and Wales) or the Court of Session (Scotland).

Parties are expected to comply with strictly enforced time limits when applying for a review or appeal.

== History ==
The Employment Appeal Tribunal was created in 1975 as a successor to the National Industrial Relations Court, which had been abolished in 1974.

Presidents of the Employment Appeal Tribunal

- 1976 to 1978 – Sir Raymond Phillips
- 1978 to 1981 – Sir Gordon Slynn
- 1981 to 1983 – Sir Nicolas Browne-Wilkinson
- 1983 to 1985 – Sir John Waite
- 1986 to 1988 – Sir Oliver Popplewell
- 1988 to 1993 – Sir John Wood
- 1993 to 1996 – Sir John Mummery
- 1996 to 1999 – Sir Thomas Morison
- 1999 to 2002 – Sir John Lindsay
- 2002 to 2005 – Sir Michael Burton
- 2006 to 2008 – Sir Patrick Elias
- 2009 to 2011 – Sir Nicholas Underhill
- 2012 to 2015 – Sir Brian Langstaff
- 2016 to 2018 – Dame Ingrid Simler
- 2019 to 2022 – Sir Akhlaq Choudhury
- 2022 to 2025 – Dame Jennifer Eady
- 2025 to present - Lord Fairley

== Offices ==
The tribunal has two permanent offices: for England and Wales it is located at Fleetbank House, Salisbury Square, in the Fleet Street area of London; for Scotland it is located at George House, 126 George Street in Edinburgh.
