= List of judgments of the Supreme Court of the United Kingdom delivered in 2012 =

This is a list of the judgments given by the Supreme Court of the United Kingdom in the year 2012. They are ordered by Neutral citation.

The table lists judgments made by the court and the opinions of the judges in each case. Judges are treated as having concurred in another's judgment when they either formally attach themselves to the judgment of another or speak only to acknowledge their concurrence with one or more judges. Any judgment which reaches a conclusion which differs from the majority on one or more major points of the appeal has been treated as dissent.

All dates are for 2012 unless expressly stated otherwise.

== 2012 case summaries ==
Unless otherwise noted, cases were heard by a panel of 5 judges.

Cases involving Scots law are highlighted in orange. Cases involving Northern Irish law are highlighted in green.

Case name	Citation	Date	Legal subject	Summary of decision
Ravat v Halliburton Manufacturing and Services Ltd	[2012] UKSC 1	8 February 2012	Jurisdiction; Labour law	
Rabone v Pennine Care NHS Trust	[2012] UKSC 2	8 February 2012	Article 2, ECHR	
Re. Stanford International Bank Ltd v Director of the Serious Fraus Office	[2012] UKSC 3	15 February 2012	Restraint order	
Sugar v British Broadcasting Corporation	[2012] UKSC 4	15 February 2012	Freedom of information	
Re Peacock	[2012] UKSC 5	22 February 2012	Proceeds of Crime Act 2002	
Re Lehman Brothers International and Re the Insolvency Act 1986	[2012] UKSC 6	29 February 2012	Insolvency law	
Anderson v Shetland Islands Council	[2012] UKSC 7	29 February 2012	Security for costs	
W and BB v Secretary of State for the Home Department	[2012] UKSC 8	7 March 2012	Immigration law	
Ministry of Defence v AB	[2012] UKSC 9	14 March 2012	Limitation Act 1980	
Re S (A Child)	[2012] UKSC 10	14 March 2012	Child abduction	
Flood v Times Newspapers Ltd	[2012] UKSC 11	21 March 2012	Defamation	
R (ST) v Secretary of State for the Home Department	[2012] UKSC 12	21 March 2012	Immigration law	
Tesco Stores Ltd v Dundee City Council	[2012] UKSC 13	21 March 2012	Planning law	
BAI (Run Off) Ltd v Durham (The Trigger Litigation)	[2012] UKSC 14	28 March 2012	Insurance law; negligence	
Homer v Chief Constable of West Yorkshire Police	[2012] UKSC 15	25 April 2012	Labour law	It was a violation of the Equality Act 2010 to require a policeman to have a law degree close to retirement to continue in a similar job.
Seldon v Clarkson Wright and Jakes	[2012] UKSC 16	25 April 2012	Labour law	There was no unjustified indirect discrimination under the Equality Act 2010 by a firm having a policy of requiring partners to retire at a certain age, since this enabled young people to advance.
Petroleo Brasileiro SA v E.N.E. Kos 1 Ltd	[2012] UKSC 17	2 May 2012	Maritime law	
Humphreys v Commissioners for Her Majesty's Revenue and Customs	[2012] UKSC 18	16 May 2012	Tax credit	
Test Claimants in the Franked Investment Income Group Litigation v Commissioners of Inland Revenue	[2012] UKSC 19	23 May 2012	Corporation tax	
Lukaszewski v The District Court in Torun, Poland	[2012] UKSC 20	23 May 2012	European Arrest Warrant	
NJDB v JEG	[2012] UKSC 21	23 May 2012	Family law	
Assange v The Swedish Prosecution Authority	[2012] UKSC 22	30 May 2012	European Arrest Warrant	
R (KM) v Cambridgeshire County Council	[2012] UKSC 23	31 May 2012	Disability law	
BH v The Lord Advocate	[2012] UKSC 24	20 June 2012	Extradition; Article 8, ECHR	
HH v Deputy Prosecutor of the Italian Republic, Genoa	[2012] UKSC 25	20 June 2012	European Arrest Warrant	
Fairclough Homes Ltd v Summers	[2012] UKSC 26	27 June 2012	Criminal law	
Oracle America Inc (Formerly Sun Microsystems Inc) v M-Tech Data Ltd	[2012] UKSC 27	27 June 2012	Free movement of goods	
Phillips v Mulcaire	[2012] UKSC 28	4 July 2012	Phone hacking	
Gow v Grant	[2012] UKSC 29	4 July 2012	Family law	
ANS v ML	[2012] UKSC 30	11 July 2012	Family law; Article 8, ECHR	
G Hamilton (Tullochgribban Mains) Ltd v The Highland Council	[2012] UKSC 31	11 July 2012	Planning law	
R (Munir) v Secretary of State for the Home Department	[2012] UKSC 32	18 July 2012	Immigration law	
R (Alvi) v Secretary of State for the Home Department	[2012] UKSC 33	18 July 2012	Immigration law	
The Health and Safety Executive v Wolverhampton City Council	[2012] UKSC 34	18 July 2012	Judicial review	
Perry v Serious Organised Crime Agency	[2012] UKSC 35	25 July 2012	Proceeds of Crime Act 2002	
T (Children)	[2012] UKSC 36	25 July 2012	Costs	
Hewage v Grampian Health Board	[2012] UKSC 37	25 July 2012	Labour law	
RT v Secretary of State for the Home Department	[2012] UKSC 38	25 July 2012	Immigration law	
Solihull Metropolitan Borough Council v Hickin	[2012] UKSC 39	25 July 2012	Landlord-tenant law	
SerVaas Inc v Rafidain Bank	[2012] UKSC 40	17 August 2012	State Immunity Act 1978	
Day v Hosebay Ltd	[2012] UKSC 41	10 October 2012	Leasehold Reform Act 1967	
R v Varma	[2012] UKSC 42	10 October 2012	Proceeds of Crime Act 2002	
British Airways plc v Williams	[2012] UKSC 43	17 October 2012	Labour law	
Walton v The Scottish Ministers	[2012] UKSC 44	17 October 2012	Planning law	
BCL Old Co Ltd v BASF plc	[2012] UKSC 45	24 October 2012	Competition law	
Rubin v Eurofinance SA	[2012] UKSC 46	24 October 2012	Jurisdiction	
Birmingham City Council v Abdulla	[2012] UKSC 47	24 October 2012	Labour law	
Secretary of State for Foreign and Commonwealth Affairs v Yunus Rahmatullah	[2012] UKSC 48	31 October 2012	Habeas corpus	
Jessy Saint Prix v Secretary of State for Work and Pensions	[2012] UKSC 49	31 October 2012	Labour law	
Morris v Rae	[2012] UKSC 50	7 November 2012	Contract law	
R v Waya	[2012] UKSC 51	14 November 2012	Proceeds of Crime Act 2002	
R (Gujra) v Crown Prosecution Service	[2012] UKSC 52	14 November 2012	Private prosecution	
Local Government Byelaws (Wales) Bill 2012 – Reference by the Attorney General for England and Wales	[2012] UKSC 53	21 November 2012	Welsh devolution	
Al-Sirri v Secretary of State for the Home Department	[2012] UKSC 54	21 November 2012	Immigration law	
The Rugby Football Union v Consolidated Information Services Ltd (Formerly Viagogo Ltd)	[2012] UKSC 55	21 November 2012	Charter of Fundamental Rights of the European Union	
The Catholic Child Welfare Society v Various Claimants and The Institute of the Brothers of the Christian Schools	[2012] UKSC 56	21 November 2012	Vicarious liability	
Ruddy v Chief Constable, Strathclyde Police	[2012] UKSC 57	28 November 2012	Article 3, ECHR	
RM v The Scottish Ministers	[2012] UKSC 58	28 November 2012	Judicial review	
X v Mid Sussex Citizens Advice Bureau	[2012] UKSC 59	12 December 2012	Labour law	
Re A (A Child)	[2012] UKSC 60	12 December 2012	Family law	
Imperial Tobacco Ltd v The Lord Advocate	[2012] UKSC 61	12 December 2012	Scottish devolution	
Kinloch v Her Majesty's Advocate	[2012] UKSC 62	19 December 2012	Article 6, ECHR; Article 8, ECHR	
Société Générale, London Branch v Geys	[2012] UKSC 63	19 December 2012	Labour law	

== 2012 judgments ==
Delivered a judgment (majority)	Concurred in the judgment of another justice (majority)	Delivered a judgment (dissenting)	Concurred in the judgment of another justice (dissent)	Did not participate in the decision

Case name	Citation	Argued	Decided	Phillips of Worth Matravers	Hope of Craighead	Walker of Gestingthorpe	Hale of Richmond	Brown of Eaton-under-Heywood	Mance	Kerr of Tonaghmore	Clarke of Stone-cum-Ebony	Dyson	Judge	Wilson of Culworth	Sumption	Reed	Carnwath of Notting Hill	Neuberger of Abbotsbury
Ravat v Halliburton Manufacturing and Services Ltd	[2012] UKSC 1	22 November 2011	8 February
Rabone v Pennine Care NHS Trust	[2012] UKSC 2	7–9 November 2011	8 February
Stanford International Bank Ltd v Director of The Serious Fraud Office	[2012] UKSC 3	25 January	15 February
Sugar v British Broadcasting Corporation	[2012] UKSC 4	23–24 November 2011	15 February
Re Peacock	[2012] UKSC 5	14 December 2011	22 February
Re Lehman Brothers International and Re the Insolvency Act 1986	[2012] UKSC 6	31 October-3 November 2011	29 February
Anderson v Shetland Islands Council	[2012] UKSC 7	N/A	29 February
W and BB v Secretary of State for the Home Department	[2012] UKSC 8	30 January	7 March
Ministry of Defence v AB	[2012] UKSC 9	14–17 November 2011	14 March
Re S (A Child)	[2012] UKSC 10	20 February	14 March
Flood v Times Newspapers Ltd	[2012] UKSC 11	17–18 October 2011	21 March
R (ST) v Secretary of State for the Home Department	[2012] UKSC 12	13–14 February	21 March
Tesco Stores Ltd v Dundee City Council	[2012] UKSC 13	15–16 February	21 March
BAI (Run Off) Ltd v Durham (The Trigger Litigation)	[2012] UKSC 14	5–8 & 12–15 December 2011	28 March
Homer v Chief Constable of West Yorkshire Police	[2012] UKSC 15	17–19 January	25 April
Seldon v Clarkson Wright and Jakes	[2012] UKSC 16	17–18 January	25 April
Petroleo Brasileiro SA v E.N.E. Kos 1 Ltd	[2012] UKSC 17	12 January	2 May
Humphreys v Commissioners for Her Majesty's Revenue and Customs	[2012] UKSC 18	14–15 March	16 May
Test Claimants in the Franked Investment Income Group Litigation v Commissioners of Inland Revenue	[2012] UKSC 19	21–23 & 27–9 February	23 May
Lukaszewski v The District Court in Torun, Poland	[2012] UKSC 20	21–22 February	23 May
NJDB v JEG	[2012] UKSC 21	13–14 March	23 May
Assange v The Swedish Prosecution Authority	[2012] UKSC 22	1–2 February	30 May
R (KM) v Cambridgeshire County Council	[2012] UKSC 23	7–8 February	31 May
BH v The Lord Advocate	[2012] UKSC 24	5–8 March	20 June
HH v Deputy Prosecutor of the Italian Republic, Genoa	[2012] UKSC 25	5–8 March	20 June
Fairclough Homes Ltd v Summers	[2012] UKSC 26	18–19 April	27 June
Oracle America Inc (Formerly Sun Microsystems Inc) v M-Tech Data Ltd	[2012] UKSC 27	30 April-1 May	27 June
Phillips v Mulcaire	[2012] UKSC 28	8–10 May	4 July
Gow v Grant	[2012] UKSC 29	24 May	4 July
ANS v ML	[2012] UKSC 30	21–22 May	11 July
G Hamilton (Tullochgribban Mains) Ltd v The Highland Council	[2012] UKSC 31	20 June	11 July
R (Munir) v Secretary of State for the Home Department	[2012] UKSC 32	24–26 April	18 July
R (Alvi) v Secretary of State for the Home Department	[2012] UKSC 33	24–26 April	18 July
The Health and Safety Executive v Wolverhampton City Council	[2012] UKSC 34	13–14 June	18 July
Perry v Serious Organised Crime Agency	[2012] UKSC 35	2–22 March	25 July
T (Children)	[2012] UKSC 36	25 June	25 July
Hewage v Grampian Health Board	[2012] UKSC 37	26 June	25 July
RT v Secretary of State for the Home Department	[2012] UKSC 38	18–19 June	25 July
Solihull Metropolitan Borough Council v Hickin	[2012] UKSC 39	3 July	25 July
SerVaas Inc v Rafidain Bank	[2012] UKSC 40	28–29 May	17 August
Day v Hosebay Ltd	[2012] UKSC 41	16–18 July	10 October
R v Varma	[2012] UKSC 42	27 June	10 October
British Airways plc v Williams	[2012] UKSC 43	23 July	17 October
Walton v The Scottish Ministers	[2012] UKSC 44	9–10 July	17 October
BCL Old Co Ltd v BASF plc	[2012] UKSC 45	9–10 July	24 October
Rubin v Eurofinance SA	[2012] UKSC 46	21–24 May	24 October
Birmingham City Council v Abdulla	[2012] UKSC 47	11 July	24 October
Secretary of State for Foreign and Commonwealth Affairs v Yunus Rahmatullah	[2012] UKSC 48	2–3 July	31 October
Jessy Saint Prix v Secretary of State for Work and Pensions	[2012] UKSC 49	15 October	31 October
Morris v Rae	[2012] UKSC 50	3 October	7 November
R v Waya	[2012] UKSC 51	27–29 March	14 November
R (Gujra) v Crown Prosecution Service	[2012] UKSC 52	4 October	14 November
Local Government Byelaws (Wales) Bill 2012 – Reference by the Attorney General for England and Wales	[2012] UKSC 53	9–10 October	21 November
Al-Sirri v Secretary of State for the Home Department	[2012] UKSC 54	14–17 May	21 November
The Rugby Football Union v Consolidated Information Services Limited (Formerly Viagogo Limited)	[2012] UKSC 55	14 June	21 November
The Catholic Child Welfare Society v Various Claimants and The Institute of the Brothers of the Christian Schools	[2012] UKSC 56	23–24 July	21 November
Ruddy v Chief Constable, Strathclyde Police	[2012] UKSC 57	29 October	28 November
RM v The Scottish Ministers	[2012] UKSC 58	23 October	28 November
X v Mid Sussex Citizens Advice Bureau	[2012] UKSC 59	31 October-1 November	12 December
Re A (A Child)	[2012] UKSC 60	29 November	12 December
Imperial Tobacco Limited v The Lord Advocate	[2012] UKSC 61	12–13 November	12 December
Kinloch v Her Majesty's Advocate	[2012] UKSC 62	26 November	19 December
Société Générale, London Branch v Geys	[2012] UKSC 63	17–18 October	19 December

== Judges ==
- Lord Judge was the Lord Chief Justice and President of the Courts of England and Wales in 2012 but sat on four cases in the Supreme Court.
- Lord Brown served until 9 April 2012.
- Lord Phillips served until 30 September 2012.
- Lord Sumption became a justice on 11 January 2012. He replaced Lord Collins.
- Lord Reed became a justice on 6 February 2012. He replaced Lord Rodger.
- Lord Carnwath became a justice on 17 April 2012. He replaced Lord Brown.
- Lord Neuberger became president of the supreme court on 1 October 2012. He replaced Lord Phillips.
