= Patrick Elias =

British jurist

The Right Honourable Sir Patrick Elias PC

Lord Justice of Appeal

Personal details
- Born: 28 March 1947 Cardiff, Wales
- Education: University of Exeter (LL.B)
- Occupation: Judge

Sir Patrick Elias, PC (born 28 March 1947) is a retired Welsh barrister and Lord Justice of Appeal.

== Early life and education ==
Patrick Elias was born in Cardiff where he attended Cardiff High School for Boys. and received his undergraduate degree, LL.B with first-class honours, at Exeter University in 1969, where he was a member of both the rugby and cricket teams. He was called to the Bar in 1973 (Inner Temple). His brother is Gerard Elias QC.

== Professional life ==
Before becoming a Bencher in 1995, he was a fellow of Pembroke College, Cambridge and served as Assistant Recorder from 1997 to 1999.

He was appointed Deputy High Court Judge in January 1999 and four months later, in May 1999, he was named Judge of the High Court, Queen's Bench Division, with the customary knighthood in July 1999. He was President of the Employment Appeal Tribunal from 2006 to 2009.

Mr Justice Elias was appointed to Her Majesty's Privy Council on 3 March 2009.

== Cases ==
- R (Seymour-Smith) v SS for Employment [2000] UKHL 12 (represented the government against a claim that legislation was sex discrimination)
- Wilson v United Kingdom [2002] ECHR 552 (represented the employer: lost)
- James v Greenwich LBC [2006] UKEAT 0006_06_2112 (held that agency workers should not get rights: disapproved in principle in Autoclenz Ltd v Belcher [2011] UKSC 41)
- Royal Mail Group Ltd v CWU [2009] EWCA Civ 1045 (holding in the EAT that employers forgetting to consult with trade unions before a transfer of undertaking absolved them of a duty)
- Eweida v British Airways plc [2009] IRLR 78 (held that a woman who wore a cross had no claim for religious discrimination: found wrong by the European Court of Human Rights)
- Royal Mail Group Ltd v Communication Workers Union [2008] UKEAT 0338_08_0212 (held that an employer was not responsible for its own failure to inform and consult staff about business changes)
- X v Mid Sussex Citizens Advice Bureau [2011] EWCA Civ 28 (held that a volunteer had no rights against discrimination)
- RMT v Serco Ltd [2011] EWCA Civ 226 (stated obiter that unions had no right to strike at common law)
- Homer v Chief Constable of West Yorkshire Police [2012] UKSC 15 (held in the EAT that a man had not suffered indirect age discrimination, even though a new rule was introduced requiring him to get a law degree: overturned)
- Clyde & Co LLP v Bates van Winkelhof [2012] EWCA Civ 1207 (held that a partner had no claim against detriment for whistleblowing: overturned)
- Hudson v Department for Work and Pensions [2012] EWCA Civ 1416 (held, against Smith LJ dissenting, that a fixed term worker could not claim a permanent contract after 4 years work because part of that time was training)
- Turner v East Midlands Trains Ltd [2012] EWCA Civ 1470 (held that there is no proportionality test in unfair dismissal)
- Smith v Carillion (JM) Ltd [2015] EWCA Civ 209 (held that a blacklisted union member could be persecuted because he was an agency worker)
- KV Sri Lanka v SSHD EWCA Civ 119, [2017]
