= Uber BV v Aslam =

British labour law case

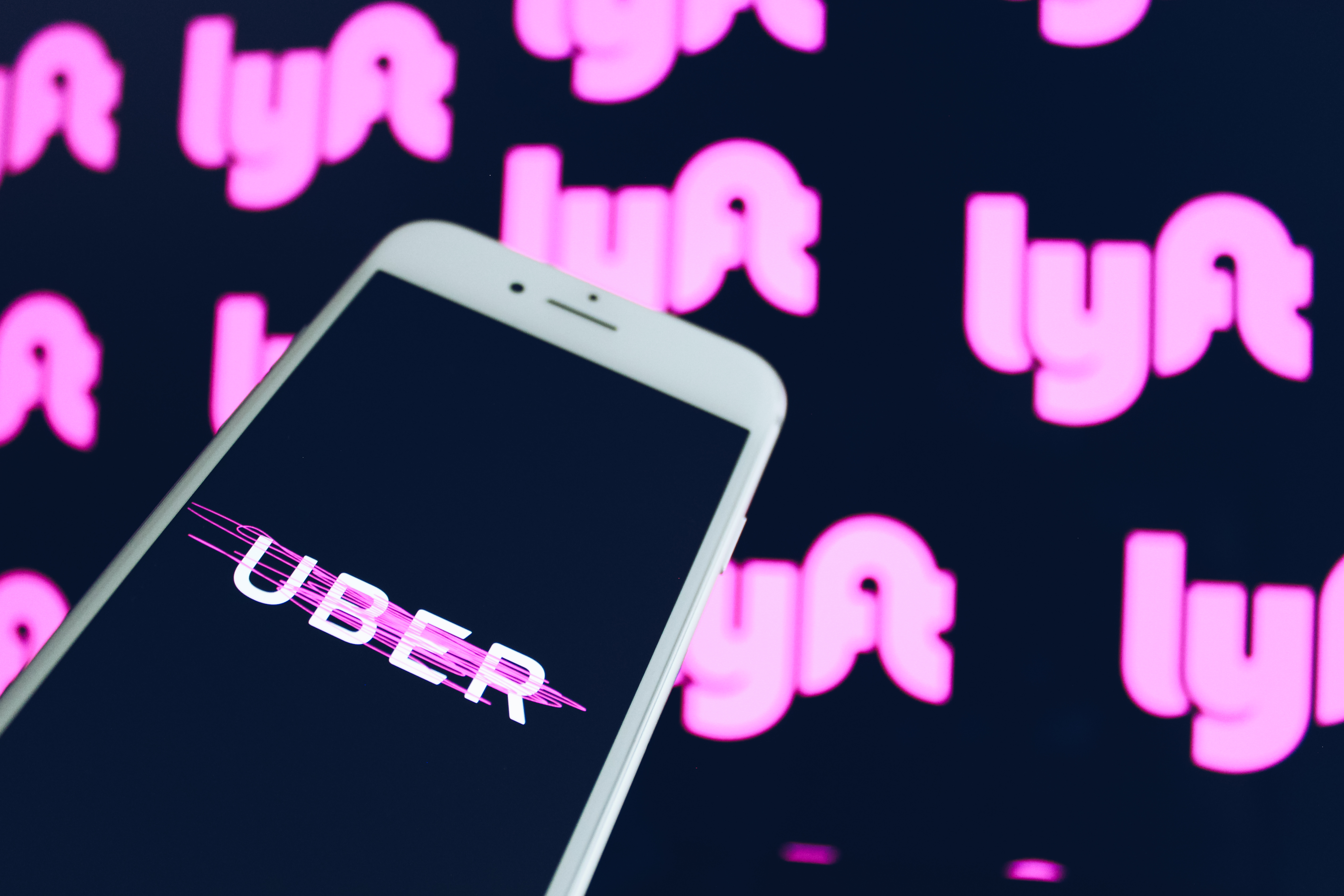
- Court: Supreme Court of the United Kingdom
- Decided: 19 February 2021
- Citation: [2021] UKSC 5

Case history
- Prior actions: [2018] EWCA Civ 2748, [2017] UKEAT 0056_17_1011, [2016] EW Misc B68 (ET) (28 October 2016)

Court membership
- Judges sitting: Lord Reed, Lord Hodge, Lady Arden, Lord Kitchin, Lord Sales, Lord Hamblen, and Lord Leggatt

Keywords
- Worker status, Employment rights, Sham self-employment

Uber BV v Aslam [2021] UKSC 5 is a landmark case in UK labour law and company law on employment rights. The UK Supreme Court held the transport corporation, Uber, must pay its drivers the national living wage, and at least 28 days paid holidays, from the time that drivers log onto the Uber app, and are willing and able to work. The Supreme Court decision was unanimous, and upheld the Court of Appeal, Employment Appeal Tribunal, and Employment Tribunal. The Supreme Court, and all courts below, left open whether the drivers are also employees (and entitled further to protection from unfair dismissal, National Insurance contributions, and employer arrangement of income tax) but indicated that the criteria for employment status was fulfilled, given Uber's control over drivers.

On 16 March 2021, Uber indicated that it intended to violate the Supreme Court ruling, by only paying drivers the minimum wage while driving, not when being available for work as the Supreme Court required.

== Facts ==
Yaseen Aslam and James Farrar and others were founders of the ADCU . The lead claimants, alongside a number of drivers, claimed that they should be paid the minimum wage under the National Minimum Wage Act 1998 and receive paid annual leave under the Working Time Regulations 1998 while working as drivers for Uber. Uber BV, a subsidiary of Uber incorporated in the Netherlands, argued that their drivers were self-employed independent contractors, and that it owed them no worker or employee obligations. Its contracts described the drivers as "partners" and stated that "nothing shall create an employment relationship between Uber and the partner". The drivers argued that this was a sham. Under the Employment Rights Act 1996 section 230 (and equivalent sections in the National Minimum Wage Act 1998) a "worker" who is entitled to the minimum wage or paid holidays is anyone (a) with a contract of employment or (b) anyone who personally performs work but not for a client or customer. The drivers contended they were workers (without specifying which type).

== Judgment ==
=== Employment tribunal ===
The employment tribunal unanimously held that the drivers were "workers" within the definition in section 230(3)(b) of the Employment Rights Act 1996, and were thus entitled to the minimum wage and holiday pay. The tribunal did not specify whether the claimants were also employees.

As to Uber's tactics in pursuing its case, the Tribunal observed:

This is, we think, an excellent illustration of the phenomenon of which Elias J warned in the Kalwak case of "armies of lawyers" contriving documents in their clients' interests which simply misrepresent the true rights and obligations on both sides.

The Tribunal gave the following reasons for arriving at its decision:

1. An organisation resorting in its documentation to fictions, twisted language and even brand new terminology, merited a degree of scepticism.
2. There were many things said and written in the name of Uber in unguarded moments, which reinforce the Claimants' simple case that the organisation runs a transportation business and employs the drivers to that end.
3. It is unreal to deny that Uber is in business as a supplier of transportation services.
4. Uber's general case and the written terms on which they rely do not correspond with the practical reality.
5. The logic of Uber's case became all the more difficult as it was developed.
6. It was not real to regard Uber as working "for" the drivers and that the only sensible interpretation is that the relationship was the other way around.
7. The drivers fell full square within the terms of the 1996 Act, s 230(3)(b).
8. The guidance in the principal authorities favoured the conclusion.
9. The authorities relied upon by Uber's counsel did not support the conclusion for which he argued.
10. The terms on which Uber rely do not correspond with the reality of the relationship between the organisation and the drivers. Accordingly, the Tribunal is free to disregard them.
11. None of the above reasoning should be taken as doubting that the Respondents could have devised a business model not involving them employing drivers. The Tribunal found only that the model which they chose failed to achieve that aim.

=== Employment Appeal Tribunal ===
The Employment Appeal Tribunal dismissed the appeal on 10 November 2017. In her ruling, HHJ Eady stated:

I am satisfied the ET did not err either in its approach or in its conclusions when rejecting the contention that the contract was between driver and passenger and that [Uber] was simply the agent in this relationship, providing its services as such to the drivers. Having rejected that characterisation of the relevant relationships, on its findings as to the factual reality of the situation, the ET was entitled to conclude there was a contract between [Uber] and the drivers whereby the drivers personally undertook work for [Uber] as part of its business of providing transportation services to passengers in the London area.

=== Court of Appeal ===
The majority of the Court of Appeal (Sir Terence Etherton MR and Bean LJ) upheld the Employment Appeal Tribunal decision, so that Uber drivers are workers entitled to the minimum wage and paid holidays. The joint majority judgment said the following:

49. There is no dispute that Autoclenz puts paid, at least in an employment context, to the idea that all that matters is the terms of any written contract, with the exception of a document intended by all parties executing it to be a sham. Clearly, however, the case goes a good deal further. We regard as particularly significant Lord Clarke's endorsement of the advice of Aikens LJ to tribunals to be "realistic and worldly wise" in this type of case when considering whether the terms of a written contract reflect the real terms of the bargain between the parties; and of the similar advice of Elias J that tribunals should take a "sensible and robust view of these matters in order to prevent form undermining substance".

50. We also attach importance to the approval given by Lord Clarke to the conclusions drawn by Sedley LJ in this court from what he (Lord Clarke) described as the "critical findings of fact" by Employment Judge Foxwell in the ET. Judge Foxwell noted that the claimants had no say in the terms on which they performed work; the contracts were devised entirely by Autoclenz; and the services they provided were subject to a detailed specification. The claimants had no control over the way in which they did their work. Judge Foxwell's conclusion from the facts was that the "elaborate protestations in the contractual documents that the men were self-employed" bore no practical relation to the reality of the relationship. Consequently, Lord Clarke held, the documents did not reflect the true agreement between the parties. The ET had been entitled to "disregard" the terms of the written documents, insofar as they were inconsistent with the true terms agreed between the parties.

[The judgment discussed the UK Supreme Court case of Secret Hotels2 relied upon by counsel for Uber and continued.]

53. Autoclenz was not mentioned in the judgment, nor even apparently cited in argument, in Secret Hotels2. The latter is obviously not an employment case and there was no suggestion that the written terms misrepresented what was occurring on the ground. There was undoubtedly a contract between the company and each hotel, in contrast to the present case where Uber seek to argue that there is no contractual relationship between the drivers and ULL.

54. In the course of supplementary oral submissions Ms Rose argued that Autoclenz could not be used to disregard the Rider Terms, since these were a contract between passenger and driver, not an employment contract in any sense. Instead, she said, we should follow Secret Hotels2. We disagree. Autoclenz holds that the Court can disregard the terms of any contract created by the employer in so far as it seeks to characterise the relationship between the employer and the individuals who provide it with services (whether employees or workers) in a particular artificial way. Otherwise employers would simply be able to evade the consequences of Autoclenz by the creation of more elaborate contrivances involving third parties.

...

69. Ms Rose also placed reliance on Stringfellow Restaurants Ltd v Quashie [2013] IRLR 99 CA; [2012] EWCA Civ 1735. That again was not a case about "worker" status but about whether the claimant was an employee or an independent contractor. The claimant was a lap dancer who performed for the entertainment of guests at the respondents' clubs. She paid the respondent a fee for each night worked. Doing so enabled her to earn substantial payments from the guests for whom she danced. She negotiated those payments with the guests. The respondent ended its working relationship with her and she complained of unfair dismissal. At a preliminary hearing, an ET held that there was no contract of employment. The EAT disagreed but the Court of Appeal restored the first instance decision. Elias LJ gave the only substantive judgment. After discussing the Cheng Yuen case, he said this:

50. ... The club did not employ the dancer to dance; rather she paid them to be provided with an opportunity to earn money by dancing for the clients. The fact that the appellant also derived profits from selling food and drink to the clients does not alter that fact. That is not to say that Cheng provides a complete analogy; I accept Mr Hendy's submission that the relationship of the claimant to the club is more integrated than [that of] the caddie with the golf club. It is not simply a licence to work on the premises. But in its essence the tripartite relationship is similar.

51. The fact that the dancer took the economic risk is also a very powerful pointer against the contract being a contract of employment. Indeed, it is the basis of the economic reality test, described above. It is not necessary to go so far as to accept the submission of Mr Linden that absent an obligation on the employer to pay a wage ... the relationship can never as a matter of law constitute a contract of employment. But it would, I think, be an unusual case where a contract of service is found to exist when the worker takes the economic risk and is paid exclusively by third parties. On any view, the Tribunal was entitled to find that the lack of any obligation to pay did preclude the establishment of such a contract here.

70. Central to Elias LJ's conclusion was the finding that the claimant took an economic risk in view of the fixed sums which she had to pay the club irrespective of the number of her customers. As with the golf club case and for similar reasons, we did not find this case of any assistance.

Discussion

71. In our view the ET was not only entitled, but correct, to find that each of the Claimant drivers was working for ULL as a "limb (b) worker".

...

When are the drivers workers?

99. If, as the ET found and we accept, the drivers were workers providing their services to ULL, the final question (argued only briefly before us) is at what times they were to be classified as so working. Uber places great emphasis on the fact that its standard terms (whether in the 2013 or the 2015 versions) expressly permit drivers to use other competing apps and to have more than one switched on at the same time. There appears to have been very little evidence before the ET as to how often this occurs in practice.

100. It is common ground that a driver can only be described as providing services to Uber when he is in the Territory (i.e., for present purposes, in London) and has the Uber App switched on. The Claimants contended, and the ET found, that they were providing services to ULL throughout the time when they satisfied these requirements. Uber submitted that, if (contrary to its primary submissions) the drivers were providing services to ULL, it could only be during each ride, that is to say from the time the passenger is picked up until the time the car reaches the passenger's destination. A middle course is to say that the driver is providing services to ULL from the moment he accepts the booking until the end of the passenger's journey but not when (in the words of counsel) he is simply circling around waiting for a call.

...

Final general observation

105. In the section headed "Broader Considerations" at the end of his judgment Underhill LJ refers to current debate, quotes from an article by Sir Patrick Elias, refers to the Taylor Review and the consultation on the issues raised by the Review, and concludes that, if any change is to be made to what he concludes is the legal answer in the present case, it should be left to Parliament. None of those documents and developments was referred to in the oral or written submissions before us and we do not consider that it would be appropriate to engage with what Underhill LJ writes about them. At the end of the day, the differences between ourselves and Underhill LJ on the main issue turn on two broad matters, one primarily a matter of law and the other primarily a matter of fact. The former concerns the extent to which Autoclenz permits the court to ignore written contractual terms which do not reflect what reasonable people would consider to be the reality. The latter concerns the question as to what reasonable people would consider to be the reality of the actual working relationship between Uber and its drivers. We consider that the extended meaning of "sham" endorsed in Autoclenz provides the common law with ample flexibility to address the convoluted, complex and artificial contractual arrangements, no doubt formulated by a battery of lawyers, unilaterally drawn up and dictated by Uber to tens of thousands of drivers and passengers, not one of whom is in a position to correct or otherwise resist the contractual language. As to the reality, not only do we see no reason to disagree with the factual conclusions of the ET as to the working relationship between Uber and the drivers, but we consider that the ET was plainly correct.

Underhill LJ dissented, saying the following.

164. The question whether those who provide personal services through internet platforms similar to that operated by Uber should enjoy some or all of the rights and protections that come with worker status is a very live one at present. There is a widespread view that they should, because of the degree to which they are economically dependent on the platform provider. My conclusion that the Claimants are not workers does not depend on any rejection of that view. It is based simply on what I believe to be the correct construction of the legislation currently in force. If on that basis the scope of protection does not go far enough the right answer is to amend the legislation. Courts are anxious so far as possible to adapt the common law to changing conditions, but the tools at their disposal are limited, particularly when dealing with statutory definitions. I have already explained why I do not think that Autoclenz can be treated as a tool to re-write any disadvantageous contractual provision that results from the disparity of bargaining power between (putative) employer and (putative) worker: in cases of the present kind the problem is not that the written terms mis-state the true relationship but that the relationship created by them is one that the law does not protect. Abuse of superior bargaining power by the imposition of unreasonable contractual terms is of course a classic area for legislative intervention, and not only in the employment field.

165. A similar point is made by Sir Patrick Elias in his recent article in the Oxford Journal of Legal Studies, Changes and Challenges to the Contract of Employment, in the context of the analogous question of zero-hours contracts. He says, at p. 16:

There is no doubt that zero-hours contracts are a matter of very great concern. This is because they are often—although not always—cynically constructed agreements, framed by the employer in order to avoid their legal duties. I do not believe that the common law can successfully deal with them alone. Autoclenz allows a court to deal with the cases where the agreement is a sham, but the problems arise when it genuinely reflects the way in which the contract is performed, although the worker would choose that the contract were otherwise. The courts cannot simply ignore express terms or apply some general doctrine of unconscionability to invalidate a contract because of unequal bargaining power.

166. Even if it were open to the Courts to seek to fashion a common law route to affording protection to Uber drivers and others in the same position, I would be cautious about going down that road. The whole question of whether and how to adapt existing employment law protections to the development of the so-called gig economy, and in particular to the use of service-provision platforms such as Uber, is under active review by the Government at present.

=== Supreme Court ===
The Supreme Court held unanimously that the Employment Tribunal had been correct, and that the drivers for Uber were "workers", entitled at least to the minimum wage and paid holidays, calculated from the time that they log onto the Uber app. The Supreme Court, like the courts below, did not directly address whether the drivers were also employees, although it indicated that Uber strongly controls the nature of the work drivers do. The contracts drafted by Uber, which classified the drivers as independent contractors, did not reflect the reality of the relationship, taking into account the purpose of employment rights, and inequality of bargaining power that statutory rights were intended to correct. The judgment was held to be enforceable against Uber London Ltd, therefore bypassing the assertion by Uber that its Dutch incorporation, Uber BV, was responsible.

Lord Leggatt (with whom Lord Reed, Lord Hodge, Lady Arden, Lord Sales and Lord Hamblen agreed) gave judgment.

3. The first appellant, Uber BV, is a Dutch company which owns the rights in the Uber app. The second appellant, Uber London Ltd ("Uber London"), is a UK subsidiary of Uber BV which, since May 2012, has been licensed to operate private hire vehicles in London. The third appellant, Uber Britannia Ltd, is another UK subsidiary of Uber BV which holds licences to operate such vehicles outside London. In this judgment I will use the name "Uber" to refer to the appellants collectively when it is not necessary to differentiate between them.

...

39. Following a preliminary hearing, the employment tribunal decided that the claimants were "workers" who, although not employed under contracts of employment, worked for Uber London under "workers' contracts" within the meaning of limb (b) of the statutory definition quoted at para 35 above. The tribunal further found that, for the purposes of the relevant legislation, the claimants were working for Uber London during any period when a claimant (a) had the Uber app switched on, (b) was within the territory in which he was authorised to work, and (c) was able and willing to accept assignments.

...

Interpreting the statutory provisions

68. The judgment of this court in the Autoclenz case made it clear that whether a contract is a "worker's contract" within the meaning of the legislation designed to protect employees and other "workers" is not to be determined by applying ordinary principles of contract law such as the parol evidence rule, the signature rule and the principles that govern the rectification of contractual documents on grounds of mistake. Not only was this expressly stated by Lord Clarke but, had ordinary principles of contract law been applied, there would have been no warrant in the Autoclenz case for disregarding terms of the written documents which were inconsistent with an employment relationship, as the court held that the employment tribunal had been entitled to do. What was not, however, fully spelt out in the judgment was the theoretical justification for this approach. It was emphasised that in an employment context the parties are frequently of very unequal bargaining power. But the same may also be true in other contexts and inequality of bargaining power is not generally treated as a reason for disapplying or disregarding ordinary principles of contract law, except in so far as Parliament has made the relative bargaining power of the parties a relevant factor under legislation such as the Unfair Contract Terms Act 1977.

69. Critical to understanding the Autoclenz case, as I see it, is that the rights asserted by the claimants were not contractual rights but were created by legislation. Thus, the task for the tribunals and the courts was not, unless the legislation required it, to identify whether, under the terms of their contracts, Autoclenz had agreed that the claimants should be paid at least the national minimum wage or receive paid annual leave. It was to determine whether the claimants fell within the definition of a "worker" in the relevant statutory provisions so as to qualify for these rights irrespective of what had been contractually agreed. In short, the primary question was one of statutory interpretation, not contractual interpretation.

70. The modern approach to statutory interpretation is to have regard to the purpose of a particular provision and to interpret its language, so far as possible, in the way which best gives effect to that purpose. In UBS AG v Revenue and Customs Comrs [2016] UKSC 13; [2016] 1 WLR 1005, paras 61–68, Lord Reed (with whom the other Justices of the Supreme Court agreed) explained how this approach requires the facts to be analysed in the light of the statutory provision being applied so that if, for example, a fact is of no relevance to the application of the statute construed in the light of its purpose, it can be disregarded. Lord Reed cited the pithy statement of Ribeiro PJ in Collector of Stamp Revenue v Arrowtown Assets Ltd (2003) 6 ITLR 454, para 35:

"The ultimate question is whether the relevant statutory provisions, construed purposively, were intended to apply to the transaction, viewed realistically."

The purpose of protecting workers

71. The general purpose of the employment legislation invoked by the claimants in the Autoclenz case, and by the claimants in the present case, is not in doubt. It is to protect vulnerable workers from being paid too little for the work they do, required to work excessive hours or subjected to other forms of unfair treatment (such as being victimised for whistleblowing). The paradigm case of a worker whom the legislation is designed to protect is an employee, defined as an individual who works under a contract of employment. In addition, however, the statutory definition of a "worker" includes in limb (b) a further category of individuals who are not employees. The purpose of including such individuals within the scope of the legislation was clearly elucidated by Mr Recorder Underhill QC giving the judgment of the Employment Appeal Tribunal in Byrne Bros (Formwork) Ltd v Baird [2002] ICR 667, para 17(4):

"[T]he policy behind the inclusion of limb (b) ... can only have been to extend the benefits of protection to workers who are in the same need of that type of protection as employees stricto sensu – workers, that is, who are viewed as liable, whatever their formal employment status, to be required to work excessive hours (or, in the cases of Part II of the Employment Rights Act 1996 or the National Minimum Wage Act 1998, to suffer unlawful deductions from their earnings or to be paid too little). The reason why employees are thought to need such protection is that they are in a subordinate and dependent position vis-à-vis their employers: the purpose of the Regulations is to extend protection to workers who are, substantively and economically, in the same position. Thus the essence of the intended distinction must be between, on the one hand, workers whose degree of dependence is essentially the same as that of employees and, on the other, contractors who have a sufficiently arm's-length and independent position to be treated as being able to look after themselves in the relevant respects."

72. The Regulations referred to in this passage are the Working Time Regulations 1998 which implemented Directive 93/104/EC ("the Working Time Directive"); and a similar explanation of the concept of a worker has been given in EU law. Although there is no single definition of the term "worker", which appears in a number of different contexts in the Treaties and EU legislation, there has been a degree of convergence in the approach adopted. In Allonby v Accrington and Rossendale College (Case C-256/01) [2004] ICR 1328; [2004] ECR I-873 the European Court of Justice held, at para 67, that in the Treaty provision which guarantees male and female workers equal pay for equal work (at that time, article 141 of the EC Treaty):

... there must be considered as a worker a person who, for a certain period of time, performs services for and under the direction of another person in return for which he receives remuneration ..."

The court added (at para 68) that the authors of the Treaty clearly did not intend that the term "worker" should include "independent providers of services who are not in a relationship of subordination with the person who receives the services". In the EU case law which is specifically concerned with the meaning of the term "worker" in the Working Time Directive, the essential feature of the relationship between employer and worker is identified in the same terms as in para 67 of the Allonby judgment: Union Syndicale Solidaires Isere v Premier Ministre (Case C-428/09) EU:C:2010:612; [2010] ECR I-9961, para 28; Fenoll v Centre d’Aide par le Travail "La Jouvene" (Case C-316/13) EU:C:2015:2000; [2016] IRLR 67, para 29; and Syndicatul Familia Constanta v Directia Generala de Asistenta Sociala si Protectia Copilului Constanta (Case C-147/17) EU:C:2018:926; [2019] ICR 211, para 41. As stated by the Court of Justice of the European Union (CJEU) in the latter case, "[i]t follows that an employment relationship [ie between employer and worker] implies the existence of a hierarchical relationship between the worker and his employer" (para 42).

73. In Hashwani v Jivraj [2011] UKSC 40; [2011] 1 WLR 1872 the Supreme Court followed this approach in holding that an arbitrator was not a person employed under "a contract personally to do any work" for the purpose of legislation prohibiting discrimination on the grounds of religion or belief. Lord Clarke, with whom the other members of the court agreed, identified (at para 34) the essential questions underlying the distinction between workers and independent contractors outside the scope of the legislation as being:

"whether, on the one hand, the person concerned performs services for and under the direction of another person in return for which he or she receives remuneration or, on the other hand, he or she is an independent provider of services who is not in a relationship of subordination with the person who receives the services."

74. In the Bates van Winkelhof case at para 39, Baroness Hale cautioned that, while "subordination may sometimes be an aid to distinguishing workers from other self-employed people, it is not a freestanding and universal characteristic of being a worker." In that case the Supreme Court held that a solicitor who was a member of a limited liability partnership was a worker essentially for the reasons that she could not market her services as a solicitor to anyone other than the LLP and was an integral part of their business. While not necessarily connoting subordination, integration into the business of the person to whom personal services are provided and the inability to market those services to anyone else give rise to dependency on a particular relationship which may also render an individual vulnerable to exploitation.

75. The correlative of the subordination and/or dependency of employees and workers in a similar position to employees is control exercised by the employer over their working conditions and remuneration. As the Supreme Court of Canada observed in McCormick v Fasken Martineau DuMoulin LLP 2014 SCC 39; [2014] 2 SCR 108, para 23:

"Deciding who is in an employment relationship ... means, in essence, examining how two synergetic aspects function in an employment relationship: control exercised by an employer over working conditions and remuneration, and corresponding dependency on the part of a worker. ... The more the work life of individuals is controlled, the greater their dependency and, consequently, their economic, social and psychological vulnerability in the workplace ..."

76. Once this is recognised, it can immediately be seen that it would be inconsistent with the purpose of this legislation to treat the terms of a written contract as the starting point in determining whether an individual falls within the definition of a "worker". To do so would reinstate the mischief which the legislation was enacted to prevent. It is the very fact that an employer is often in a position to dictate such contract terms and that the individual performing the work has little or no ability to influence those terms that gives rise to the need for statutory protection in the first place. The efficacy of such protection would be seriously undermined if the putative employer could by the way in which the relationship is characterised in the written contract determine, even prima facie, whether or not the other party is to be classified as a worker. Laws such as the National Minimum Wage Act were manifestly enacted to protect those whom Parliament considers to be in need of protection and not just those who are designated by their employer as qualifying for it.

77. This point can be illustrated by the facts of the present case. The Services Agreement (like the Partner Terms before it) was drafted by Uber's lawyers and presented to drivers as containing terms which they had to accept in order to use, or continue to use, the Uber app. It is unlikely that many drivers ever read these terms or, even if they did, understood their intended legal significance. In any case there was no practical possibility of negotiating any different terms. In these circumstances to treat the way in which the relationships between Uber, drivers and passengers are characterised by the terms of the Services Agreement as the starting point in classifying the parties’ relationship, and as conclusive if the facts are consistent with more than one possible legal classification, would in effect be to accord Uber power to determine for itself whether or not the legislation designed to protect workers will apply to its drivers.

78. This is, as I see it, the relevance of the emphasis placed in the Autoclenz case (at para 35) on the relative bargaining power of the parties in the employment context and the reason why Lord Clarke described the approach endorsed in that case of looking beyond the terms of any written agreement to the parties' "true agreement" as "a purposive approach to the problem".

Restrictions on contracting out

79. Such an approach is further justified by the fact that all the relevant statutes or statutory regulations conferring rights on workers contain prohibitions against contracting out. Thus, section 203(1) of the Employment Rights Act 1996 provides:

"Any provision in an agreement (whether a contract of employment or not) is void in so far as it purports –

(a) to exclude or limit the operation of any provision of this Act, or

(b) to preclude a person from bringing any proceedings under this Act before an employment tribunal."

Section 49(1) of the National Minimum Wage Act 1998 and regulation 35(1) of the Working Time Regulations 1998 are in similar terms.

...

Status of the claimants in this case

90. The claimant drivers in the present case had in some respects a substantial measure of autonomy and independence. In particular, they were free to choose when, how much and where (within the territory covered by their private hire vehicle licence) to work. In these circumstances it is not suggested on their behalf that they performed their services under what is sometimes called an "umbrella" or "overarching" contract with Uber London – in other words, a contract whereby they undertook a continuing obligation to work. The contractual arrangements between drivers and Uber London did subsist over an extended period of time. But they did not bind drivers during periods when drivers were not working: rather, they established the terms on which drivers would work for Uber London on each occasion when they chose to log on to the Uber app.

91. Equally, it is well established and not disputed by Uber that the fact that an individual is entirely free to work or not, and owes no contractual obligation to the person for whom the work is performed when not working, does not preclude a finding that the individual is a worker, or indeed an employee, at the times when he or she is working: see eg McMeechan v Secretary of State for Employment [1997] ICR 549; Cornwall County Council v Prater [2006] EWCA Civ 102; [2006] ICR 731. As Elias J (President) said in James v Redcats (Brands) Ltd [2007] ICR 1006, para 84:

"Many casual or seasonal workers, such as waiters or fruit pickers or casual building labourers, will periodically work for the same employer but often neither party has any obligations to the other in the gaps or intervals between engagements. There is no reason in logic or justice why the lack of worker status in the gaps should have any bearing on the status when working. There may be no overarching or umbrella contract, and therefore no employment status in the gaps, but that does not preclude such a status during the period of work."

I agree, subject only to the qualification that, where an individual only works intermittently or on a casual basis for another person, that may, depending on the facts, tend to indicate a degree of independence, or lack of subordination, in the relationship while at work which is incompatible with worker status: see Windle v Secretary of State for Justice [2016] EWCA Civ 459; [2016] ICR 721, para 23.

92. In many cases it is not in dispute that the claimant is doing work or performing services personally for another person but there is an issue as to whether that person is to be classified as the claimant's employer or as a client or customer of the claimant. The situation in the present case is different in that there are three parties involved: Uber, drivers and passengers. But the focus must still be on the nature of the relationship between drivers and Uber. The principal relevance of the involvement of third parties (ie passengers) is the need to consider the relative degree of control exercised by Uber and drivers respectively over the service provided to them. A particularly important consideration is who determines the price charged to the passenger. More generally, it is necessary to consider who is responsible for defining and delivering the service provided to passengers. A further and related factor is the extent to which the arrangements with passengers afford drivers the potential to market their own services and develop their own independent business.

93. In all these respects, the findings of the employment tribunal justified its conclusion that, although free to choose when and where they worked, at times when they are working drivers work for and under contracts with Uber (and, specifically, Uber London). Five aspects of the tribunal's findings are worth emphasising.

94. First and of major importance, the remuneration paid to drivers for the work they do is fixed by Uber and the drivers have no say in it (other than by choosing when and how much to work). Unlike taxi fares, fares for private hire vehicles in London are not set by the regulator. However, for rides booked through the Uber app, it is Uber that sets the fares and drivers are not permitted to charge more than the fare calculated by the Uber app. The notional freedom to charge a passenger less than the fare set by Uber is of no possible benefit to drivers, as any discount offered would come entirely out of the driver's pocket and the delivery of the service is organised so as to prevent a driver from establishing a relationship with a passenger that might generate future custom for the driver personally (see the fifth point, discussed below). Uber also fixes the amount of its own "service fee" which it deducts from the fares paid to drivers. Uber's control over remuneration further extends to the right to decide in its sole discretion whether to make a full or partial refund of the fare to a passenger in response to a complaint by the passenger about the service provided by the driver (see para 20 above).

95. Second, the contractual terms on which drivers perform their services are dictated by Uber. Not only are drivers required to accept Uber's standard form of written agreement but the terms on which they transport passengers are also imposed by Uber and drivers have no say in them.

96. Third, although drivers have the freedom to choose when and where (within the area covered by their PHV licence) to work, once a driver has logged onto the Uber app, a driver's choice about whether to accept requests for rides is constrained by Uber. Unlike taxi drivers, PHV operators and drivers are not under any regulatory obligation to accept such requests. Uber itself retains an absolute discretion to accept or decline any request for a ride. Where a ride is offered to a driver through the Uber app, however, Uber exercises control over the acceptance of the request by the driver in two ways. One is by controlling the information provided to the driver. The fact that the driver, when informed of a request, is told the passenger's average rating (from previous trips) allows the driver to avoid low-rated passengers who may be problematic. Notably, however, the driver is not informed of the passenger's destination until the passenger is picked up and therefore has no opportunity to decline a booking on the basis that the driver does not wish to travel to that particular destination.

97. The second form of control is exercised by monitoring the driver's rate of acceptance (and cancellation) of trip requests. As described in para 18 above, a driver whose percentage rate of acceptances falls below a level set by Uber London (or whose cancellation rate exceeds a set level) receives an escalating series of warning messages which, if performance does not improve, leads to the driver being automatically logged off the Uber app and shut out from logging back on for ten minutes. This measure was described by Uber in an internal document quoted by the employment tribunal as a "penalty", no doubt because it has a similar economic effect to docking pay from an employee by preventing the driver from earning during the period while he is logged out of the app. Uber argues that this practice is justified because refusals or cancellations of trip requests cause delay to passengers in finding a driver and lead to customer dissatisfaction. I do not doubt this. The question, however, is not whether the system of control operated by Uber is in its commercial interests, but whether it places drivers in a position of subordination to Uber. It plainly does.

98. Fourth, Uber exercises a significant degree of control over the way in which drivers deliver their services. The fact that drivers provide their own car means that they have more control than would most employees over the physical equipment used to perform their work. Nevertheless, Uber vets the types of car that may be used. Moreover, the technology which is integral to the service is wholly owned and controlled by Uber and is used as a means of exercising control over drivers. Thus, when a ride is accepted, the Uber app directs the driver to the pick-up location and from there to the passenger's destination. Although, as mentioned, it is not compulsory for a driver to follow the route indicated by the Uber app, customers may complain if a different route is chosen and the driver bears the financial risk of any deviation from the route indicated by the app which the passenger has not approved (see para 8 above).

99. I have already mentioned the control exercised by monitoring a driver's acceptance and cancellation rates for trips and excluding the driver temporarily from access to the Uber app if he fails to maintain the required rates of acceptance and non-cancellation. A further potent method of control is the use of the ratings system whereby passengers are asked to rate the driver after each trip and the failure of a driver to maintain a specified average rating will result in warnings and ultimately in termination of the driver's relationship with Uber (see paras 13 and 18 above). It is of course commonplace for digital platforms to invite customers to rate products or services. Typically, however, such ratings are merely made available as information which may assist customers in choosing which product or service to buy. Under such a system the incentive for the supplier of the product or service to gain high ratings is simply the ordinary commercial incentive of satisfying customers in the hope of attracting future business. The way in which Uber makes use of customer ratings is materially different. The ratings are not disclosed to passengers to inform their choice of driver: passengers are not offered a choice of driver with, for example, a higher price charged for the services of a driver who is more highly rated. Rather, the ratings are used by Uber purely as an internal tool for managing performance and as a basis for making termination decisions where customer feedback shows that drivers are not meeting the performance levels set by Uber. This is a classic form of subordination that is characteristic of employment relationships.

100. A fifth significant factor is that Uber restricts communication between passenger and driver to the minimum necessary to perform the particular trip and takes active steps to prevent drivers from establishing any relationship with a passenger capable of extending beyond an individual ride. As mentioned, when booking a ride, a passenger is not offered a choice among different drivers and their request is simply directed to the nearest driver available. Once a request is accepted, communication between driver and passenger is restricted to information relating to the ride and is channelled through the Uber app in a way that prevents either from learning the other's contact details. Likewise, collection of fares, payment of drivers and handling of complaints are all managed by Uber in a way that is designed to avoid any direct interaction between passenger and driver. A stark instance of this is the generation of an electronic document which, although styled as an "invoice" from the driver to the passenger, is never sent to the passenger and, though available to the driver, records only the passenger's first name and not any further details (see para 10 above). Further, drivers are specifically prohibited by Uber from exchanging contact details with a passenger or contacting a passenger after the trip ends other than to return lost property (see para 12 above).

101. Taking these factors together, it can be seen that the transportation service performed by drivers and offered to passengers through the Uber app is very tightly defined and controlled by Uber. Furthermore, it is designed and organised in such a way as to provide a standardised service to passengers in which drivers are perceived as substantially interchangeable and from which Uber, rather than individual drivers, obtains the benefit of customer loyalty and goodwill. From the drivers' point of view, the same factors – in particular, the inability to offer a distinctive service or to set their own prices and Uber's control over all aspects of their interaction with passengers – mean that they have little or no ability to improve their economic position through professional or entrepreneurial skill. In practice the only way in which they can increase their earnings is by working longer hours while constantly meeting Uber's measures of performance.

102. I would add that the fact that some aspects of the way in which Uber operates its business are required in order to comply with the regulatory regime – although many features are not – cannot logically be, as Uber has sought to argue, any reason to disregard or attach less weight to those matters in determining whether drivers are workers. To the extent that forms of control exercised by Uber London are necessary in order to comply with the law, that merely tends to show that an arrangement whereby drivers contract directly with passengers and Uber London acts solely as an agent is not one that is legally available.

Working Time

121. The secondary question which arises in the light of this conclusion is: during what periods of time were the claimants working?

...

127. In the present case Uber London in the Welcome Packet of material issued to new drivers referred to logging onto the Uber app as "going on duty" and instructed drivers that: "Going on duty means you are willing and able to accept trip requests" (see para 17 above). Logging onto the Uber app was thus presented by Uber London itself to drivers as undertaking an obligation to accept work if offered. The employment tribunal also found that the third in the graduated series of messages sent to a driver whose acceptance rate of trip requests fell below a prescribed level included a statement that "being online with the Uber app is an indication that you are available to take trips, in accordance with your Services Agreement." The reference in this message to the Services Agreement must have been to clause 2.6.2, which stated:

"Customer acknowledges and agrees that repeated failure by a Driver to accommodate User requests for Transportation Services while such Driver is logged in to the Driver App creates a negative experience for Users of Uber's mobile application. Accordingly, Customer agrees and shall ensure that if a Driver does not wish to provide Transportation Services for a period of time, such Driver will log off of the Driver App."

...

The Working Time Regulations

132. For the purpose of the Working Time Regulations 1998, "working time" is defined in regulation 2(1), in relation to a worker, as "any period during which he is working, at his employer's disposal and carrying out his activity or duties".

133. There is no difficulty in principle in a finding that time when a driver is "on call" falls within this definition. A number of decisions of the CJEU establish that, for the purpose of the Working Time Directive, to which the UK Regulations aim to give effect and which defines "working time" in the same way, time spent on call counts as "working time" if the worker is required to be at or near his or her place of work. For example, in Ville de Nivelles v Matzak (Case C-518/15) EU:C:2018:82; [2018] ICR 869 the CJEU held that time spent by firefighters on stand-by at their homes, which were required to be within eight minutes travelling distance of the fire station, was working time.

134. On the facts of the present case, a driver's place of work is wherever his vehicle is currently located. Subject to the point I consider next, in the light of this case law the tribunal was justified in finding that all time spent by a driver working under a worker's contract with Uber London, including time spent "on duty" logged onto the Uber app in London available to accept a trip request, is "working time" within the meaning of the Working Time Directive and Regulations.

135. The point that – like the majority of the Court of Appeal and Judge Eady QC in the Employment Appeal Tribunal – I have found more difficult is whether a driver logged onto the Uber app in the area in which he is licensed to work can be said to be "working, at his employer’s disposal and carrying out his activity or duties" if during such times the driver is equally ready and willing to accept a trip request received from another PHV operator. It was argued with force by counsel for Uber that a driver cannot reasonably be said to be working for and at the disposal of Uber London if, while logged onto the Uber app, he is also at the same time logged onto another app provided by a competitor of Uber which operates a similar service.

136. I have concluded that this question cannot be answered in the abstract. I agree with Judge Eady QC when she said in her judgment dismissing Uber's appeal to the Employment Appeal Tribunal (at para 126) that it is a matter of fact and degree. Like the majority of the Court of Appeal, I also agree with her that:

"If the reality is that Uber's market share in London is such that its drivers are, in practical terms, unable to hold themselves out as available to any other PHV operator, then, as a matter of fact, [when they have the Uber app switched on] they are working at [Uber London’s] disposal as part of the pool of drivers it requires to be available within the territory at any one time. ... if, however, it is genuinely the case that drivers are able to also hold themselves out as at the disposal of other PHV operators when waiting for a trip, the same analysis would not apply."

137. So far as this court has been shown, no evidence was adduced at the hearing in the employment tribunal in 2016 that there was at that time any other app-based PHV transportation service operating in London or that drivers logged into the Uber app were as a matter of practical reality also able to hold themselves out as at the disposal of other PHV operators when waiting for a trip. No finding was made by the tribunal on this subject. In these circumstances I do not consider that the tribunal was wrong to find that periods during which its three conditions were met constituted "working time" for the purpose of the Working Time Regulations 1998.

== See also ==
- United Kingdom labour law
- Employment contract in English law
