= Nicholas Underhill =

Appeal Court judge in England and Wales

The Right Honourable Lord Justice Underhill
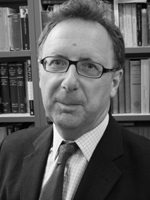

Lord Justice of Appeal
- In office 9 April 2013 – 9 October 2025
- Monarchs: Elizabeth II; Charles III

High Court Judge Queen's Bench Division
- In office 2006–2013

Personal details
- Born: Nicholas Edward Underhill; 12 May 1952 (age 74)
- Education: New College, Oxford
- Occupation: Judge
- Profession: Law

Sir Nicholas Edward Underhill (born 12 May 1952), styled The Rt Hon. Lord Justice Underhill, is a retired British judge of the Court of Appeal of England and Wales.

He was educated at Winchester College and New College, Oxford.

== Legal career ==
Underhill was called to the bar at Gray's Inn 1976 (elected a bencher 2000). He became a Queen's Counsel in 1992. He was appointed a Recorder in 1994 and was authorised as a deputy High Court judge in 1998. From 2000 to 2003, he was a temporary additional judge of the Employment Appeal Tribunal. He served as Attorney-General to the Prince of Wales from 1998 to 2006. On 30 January 2006, Underhill was appointed a High Court judge, receiving the customary knighthood, and assigned to the Queen's Bench Division. He was a judge of the Employment Appeal Tribunal from 2006 to 2013, and its president from 2009 to 2011. On 9 April 2013, he was appointed a Lord Justice of Appeal and consequently appointed to the Privy Council.

Underhill was chair of the Bar Pro Bono Unit (2002–2005). He has served as a trustee of St John's, Smith Square since 1996 and as chair since 2010. He is also a trustee of the London Library, having served since 2008, and has been vice chair since 2011.

He received an Honorary Fellowship from New College, Oxford in 2015.

== List of cases ==
- Wilson v United Kingdom [2002] ECHR 552, acting for the Daily Mail. Lost.
- Byrne Bros (Formwork) Ltd v Baird [2002] ICR 667, subordination and dependence as the keys to employee status. Rejected by the Supreme Court in Clyde & Co LLP v Bates van Winkelhof [2014] UKSC 32, [39].
- R v Barnet London Borough Council ex parte Nash, 2013
- Reilly v Secretary of State for Work and Pensions [2016] EWCA Civ 413, saying the government breached the Human Rights Act, but suggesting the government needed to do nothing
- Windle v Secretary of State for Justice [2016] EWCA Civ 459, held that court interpreters had no claim for discrimination under EA 2010 s 83(2)(a) as they did not have ‘employment... under a contract personally to do work’. Underhill LJ said that lack of mutuality also negated this worker test.
- Pharmacists Defence Association Union v Secretary of State for Business, Innovation and Skills [2017] EWCA Civ 66, refusing recognition of a trade union, unless a sham union was first derecognised
- Uber BV v Aslam [2018] EWCA Civ 2748, dissenting to hold drivers were not workers. Rejected by the Supreme Court, [2021] UKSC 5.
- IWGB v Roofoods Ltd [2021] EWCA 952, holding Deliveroo cyclists did not have a human right to join trade unions
- Adedeji v University Hospitals Birmingham NHS Foundation Trust [2021] EWCA Civ 23, Underhill approving the refusal of a claim that was 3 days late under the Equality Act 2010.
- National Union of Professional Foster Carers v Certification Officer [2021] EWCA Civ 548, Underhill LJ upheld CO that foster carers were not workers and could not get statutory recognition for their union.
