= Family law system in the UK =

Family law system in the UK may refer to:

- English family law
- Scots family law
