= Buckland v Bournemouth University Higher Education Corp =

Buckland v Bournemouth University
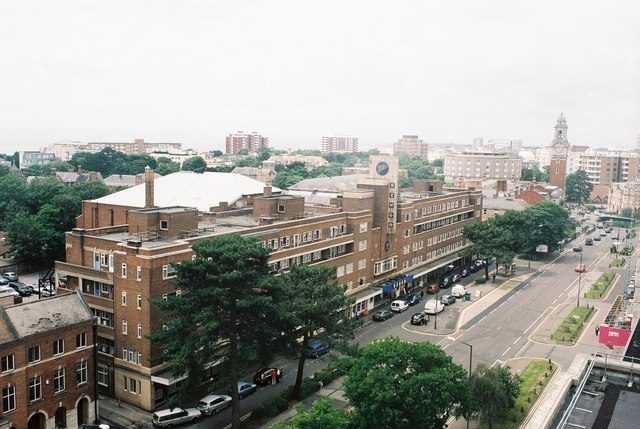
- Court: Court of Appeal
- Citations: [2010] EWCA Civ 121, [2009] IRLR 606

Keywords
- Unfair dismissal

Buckland v Bournemouth University [2010] EWCA Civ 121 is a UK labour law case, concerning unfair dismissal, now governed by the Employment Rights Act 1996.

== Facts ==
Professor Buckland taught environmental archaeology. He failed a high proportion of students on his course at Bournemouth University. The fails were endorsed by the second marker, and confirmed by the university's examiner board, but the chair of the examiner board arranged for exam remarking and elevated some scores. Professor Buckland objected, there was an inquiry, and the inquiry criticised the board and vindicated Professor Buckland. Nevertheless, Professor Buckland resigned claiming constructive dismissal. The university argued that Professor Buckland had resigned of his own accord, and so there could be no claim for unfair dismissal because there was no dismissal.

The Employment Tribunal found the university committed a fundamental breach of good faith, not cured by the inquiry. The Employment Appeal Tribunal held the reasonable range of responses did not apply when examining whether there was a constructive dismissal, and upheld the Tribunal.

== Judgment ==
The appeal was allowed, and the university's cross-appeal was dismissed.

Sedley LJ held that, following Western Excavating (ECC) Ltd v Sharp when considering whether there was a fundamental breach, an employer was not absolved if it showed its actions were within a reasonable range of responses, doubting Abbey National Plc v Fairbrother and Claridge v Daler Rowney Ltd. To say that what was in a reasonable range of responses would determine a fundamental breach would drive "a coach and four" through the law of contract of which employment law was an integral part. On the argument that subsequent behaviour could ‘cure’ a fundamental breach of contract, this could not stand because its introduction into the general law of contract could not be justified. This did not mean that a wronged party may not affirm a contract, by continuing in a job.

Carnwath LJ and Jacob LJ concurred.

== See also ==
- UK labour law
