= Gunton v Richmond upon Thames LBC =

Labour law case in the United Kingdom

- Court: Court of Appeal of England and Wales
- Citation: [1980] ICR 755

Keywords
- Wrongful dismissal

Gunton v Richmond upon Thames LBC [1980] ICR 755 is a UK labour law case, concerning wrongful dismissal.

== Facts ==
Richmond upon Thames London Borough Council had a contractual disciplinary procedure and a power to dismiss on one month’s notice. Mr Gunton claimed that, given his dismissal without notice, albeit with one month’s pay, the procedure was not properly followed.

== Judgment ==
Buckley LJ held that Mr Gunton could claim damages for failure to follow the procedure.

The issue of whether a contract of employment could be terminated by payment of contractual payment in lieu of notice without formal notice of dismissal was addressed again at trial court and Supreme Court in the case of Société Générale, London Branch v Geys, where the "elective theory" of contract determination was upheld.

== See also ==
- UK labour law
- Société Générale, London Branch v Geys, UKSC 63, which made reference to this case.
