= Société Générale, London Branch v Geys =

United Kingdom labour law case

- Court: Supreme Court of the United Kingdom
- Citation: [2012] UKSC 63

Keywords
- Wrongful dismissal

Société Générale, London Branch v Geys [2012] UKSC 63 is a UK labour law case, concerning wrongful dismissal. The Supreme Court's decision was a significant ruling in regard to the competing automatic and elective theories of contractual repudiation, affirming the elective theory.

== Facts ==
Raphael Geys's contract with Société Générale allowed for payment upon termination, three months' written notice, and incorporated the staff handbook which said in s.8.3 that he could be dismissed immediately, and the contract would terminate, if pay in lieu of notice was made. On 29 November 2007, he had a meeting and was dismissed in breach of contract. He was escorted from the building. On 18 December 2007, he received the pay in lieu in his bank account, and was sent a payslip that included details of "in lieu pay". He was not given a separate notice, or advised that the right to terminate the contract had in fact been exercised. Mr Geys's solicitors wrote on 2 January that Geys was affirming the contract. On 4 January 2008, Société Générale gave notice that the payment was in lieu of notice. Mr Geys brought proceedings.

The High Court held in favour of Mr Geys. The Court of Appeal overturned the High Court. It held Geys's contract was terminated on 18 December when pay in lieu of notice was given, but rejected Société Générale's further argument that the repudiatory dismissal on 29 November automatically terminated the contract. The Court of Appeal's ruling raised a concern that a payment made in lieu of notice but not supported by a notice of dismissal could mean staff are dismissed without realising or without knowledge of the date on which their dismissal was effective.

== Judgment ==
The Supreme Court held (Lord Hope, Lady Hale, Lord Wilson and Lord Carnworth in the majority) that Mr Geys's contract was not automatically terminated with Société Générale's wrongful repudiation. The contract would only end if the other party elected to accept such a repudiation. If it automatically terminated, this would potentially reward the party who wrongfully repudiated the contract on the termination date it chose. In many cases, provisions of a unilaterally repudiated contract would survive and be enforceable, such as covenants against competition or disciplinary procedure clauses. The staff handbook, s.8.3, made no difference to the fact that an employee had to be notified of termination. Société Générale had not given clear notice to Geys about the payment. It was only on 6 January, when Geys received Société Générale's letter of 4 January, that the contractual right to terminate under the pay in lieu of notice method was validly exercised. Only then did Gey's employment with Société Générale come to an end.

Lord Hope said the following.

16. Was Sir John Donaldson clearly right when he declared in Sanders v Ernest A Neale Ltd [1974] ICR 565 at p 571 that an unaccepted repudiation brought a contract of employment to an end? Lord Sumption says that this was an accurate summary of the position as it then stood: paras 128 and 139, below. But I find it hard to disagree with Buckley LJ's observation in Gunton v Richmond-upon-Thames London Borough Council [1981] Ch 448, 466 that Sanders v Ernest A Neale Ltd was the first case in which the automatic theory was part of the basis for the decision in an employment case. In Thomas Marshall (Exports) Ltd v Guinle [1979] Ch 227 Sir Robert Megarry V-C in his review of the authorities also took that case as his starting point. He described it as the high-water-mark of the doctrine of automatic determination, but said that the authorities on the point were in a state that was far from satisfactory. Shaw LJ, in his dissenting judgment in Gunton, referred to the field that Buckley LJ had covered in his review of the authorities as dubious. He said that, as a result of the ebb and flow of the tide of judicial opinion, the court was left in the slack water of first principles. Only a few months later, in London Transport Executive v Clarke [1981] ICR 355, the majority view in the Court of Appeal was in favour of the position that Sir Robert Megarry V-C adopted in Marshall.

17. The fact has to be faced that there is still a degree of oscillation between the two theories: David Cabrelli and Rebecca Zahn, The Elective and Automatic Theories of Termination at Common Law: Resolving the Conundrum? (2012) 41 Industrial Law Journal 346, 349. In any case, the question which of the two theories should be adopted is an open question at our level. Which result is, in principle, the most desirable? One must be careful not to assume that, just because in practice the employee may have little choice but to accept the repudiation, he has in law no alternative but to do so. I would endorse Ralph Gibson LJ's criticism in Boyo v Lambeth London Borough Council [1994] ICR 727, 743 of Buckley LJ's observation in the Gunton case that in a case of wrongful dismissal the court should easily infer that the innocent party has accepted the guilty party's repudiation of the contract. If the law requires acceptance of the repudiation, the requirement is for a real acceptance – a conscious intention to bring the contract to an end, or the doing of something that is inconsistent with its continuation. So the question is whether there are sound reasons of principle for holding that the general rule of law that requires acceptance of a repudiation does not apply.

18. The fact that an application of the automatic theory may produce an injustice is, for me, the crucial point. The question that Sir John Donaldson asked himself in Sanders v Ernest A Neale Ltd [1974] ICR 565, 571 is at the heart of the issue: why should the employee not sue for wages if it is the act of the employer which has prevented his performing the condition precedent of rendering his services? There may be grounds for thinking that the court is less reluctant than it once was to give injunctive relief in such cases, but I would not rest my decision on that point. It is the objection that the party who is in the wrong should not be permitted to benefit from his own wrong that is determinative. The timing of the repudiation may be crucial, and if the automatic theory were to prevail an employer may well be tempted to play this to his advantage – by getting in first before a rise in pay or pension entitlement takes place or, as in this case, a rise in the entitlement to bonuses. I note too that, as Professor Douglas Brodie has pointed out, it is not always true that work is the counterpart of the entitlement to wages. In some contracts wages are given to employees for holding themselves available for work: The Contract of Employment (2008), para 18-09.

19. The essential difference between the two theories may be said to be that under the automatic theory the decision as to whether the contract is at an end is made beyond the control of the innocent party in all circumstances, whereas under the elective theory it is for the innocent party to judge whether it is in his interests to keep the contract alive. Manifest justice favours preferring the interests of the innocent party to those of the wrongdoer. If there exists a good reason and an opportunity for the innocent party to affirm the contract, he should be allowed to do so: London Transport Executive v Clarke [1981] ICR 355, 367, per Templeman LJ.

Lord Wilson focused criticism on the 'automatic theory' of termination.

96. Any proponent of the automatic theory needs to be able to draw the contours of its application and to justify them logically. The following questions arise:

(a) Should purported dismissals and resignations be treated differently according to whether they are express or to be implied from words and/or conduct? If so, why?

(b) Should purported dismissals and resignations which are immediate be treated differently from those which are delayed (for example by the giving of some notice, albeit that it was too short, as in the Hill case [1972] Ch 305). If so, why?

(c) Should purported dismissals and resignations be treated differently according to whether they are outright or something less than outright? If so, why? In any event is the distinction workable? Is it enough for Mr Jeans to submit that, like elephants and post-boxes, one can recognise an outright dismissal when one sees it?

(d) If, as was held by the House of Lords in Rigby v Ferodo Ltd [1988] ICR 29, a fundamental breach other than by way of purported dismissal (namely in that case, the employer's unilateral reduction in wages below the contractual level) does not in any event attract application of the automatic theory, what would be the rationale for treating other fundamental breaches (namely purported dismissals and resignations) differently? Why should wrongful actions more clearly designed to strike at the continuation of the contract be crowned with that significant degree of legal success? As Cabrelli and Zahn suggest in their article entitled The Elective and Automatic Theories of Termination at Common Law: Resolving the Conundrum (2012) 41 ILJ 346, 354, any such difference would be counterintuitive.

(e) Is the Rigby case not inconsistent with the implied suggestion of Lord Sumption in para 129 below that the automatic theory should extend to constructive dismissals? Inherent in the notion of a constructive dismissal is resignation in response to fundamental breach: Western Excavating (ECC) Ltd v Sharp [1978] QB 761, 769, 770 (Lord Denning MR). So is there not inherent in it the need for acceptance which the Rigby case establishes?

(f) Would the automatic theory extend to wrongful repudiations of contracts of services as well as of contracts of employment? The provision of numerous services pursuant to contract – take, by way of easy examples, those of an accountant, a dentist and a builder – depends upon the cooperation of the other party. If the rationale behind the automatic theory is both the unavailability of specific performance and the inability to claim the contractual remuneration rather than damages, why should it not extend to contracts of services to which the law attaches those same two consequences? Mr Jeans was wise to decline to answer this question.

97. In proposing that the court should indorse the automatic theory, the Bank invites it to cause the law of England and Wales in relation to contracts of employment to set sail, unaccompanied, upon a journey for which I can discern no just purpose and can identify no final destination. I consider, on the contrary, that we should keep the contract of employment firmly within the harbour which the common law has solidly constructed for the entire fleet of contracts in order to protect the innocent party, as far as practicable, from the consequences of the other's breach.

Lord Sumption dissented. He said there should be a general rule that an innocent party to a repudiated contract could not treat it as subsisting if his performance would require the other party's cooperation. Cooperation, and specific performance could not be compelled. So, in his minority view, Gunton was wrong, and Geys was receiving a windfall given that the majority was preferring the "elective" theory over the "automatic" theory of termination.

== See also ==
- UK labour law
