= Stringfellow Restaurants Ltd v Quashie =

UK labour law case

- Court: Court of Appeal
- Decided: 21 December 2012
- Citation: [2012] EWCA Civ 1735, [2013] IRLR 99
- Transcript: www.bailii.org/ew/cases/EWCA/Civ/2012/1735.html

Stringfellow Restaurants Ltd v Quashie [2012] EWCA Civ 1735 is a UK labour law case concerning employment status.

== Facts ==
The claimant, Ms Quashie, worked as a lap dancer for 18 months at two clubs owned by the appellant. She paid a fee to work at the club, and was classed as an independent contractor in the club owner's handbook. Ms Quashie was paid directly by patrons, with prices set out by the club for various dance packages. She was paid in 'heavenly money', which was a type of voucher patrons bought from the club. At the end of a shift, she would exchange these for a payment from the club. The club would make various deductions from this to pay for the facilities. They could also make deductions for things such as being late for a shift, or being off rota.

Ms Quashie brought a claim for unfair dismissal, after being dismissed because of involvement with drugs. The issue was whether she came under the definition of "employee" under section 230 of the Employment Rights Act 1996. While her contract defined her as an independent contractor, she always felt as though she was treated as an employee.

== Judgement ==
The Employment Tribunal decided that Ms Quashie was not an employee because there was no wage-work bargain between her and the club, as she was paid directly by patrons. In addition to this, she had not met the continuous period of employment. Ms Quashie appealed.

Her appeal was accepted by the Employment Appeals Tribunal. The EAT took a broader understanding of the wage-work bargain, believing it to occur when an establishment provides something in exchange for work. The opportunity to work at the club was enough to satisfy this requirement. The EAT considered that since the club also had significant control over her, and she completed the work for them personally, Ms Quashie was an employee of the club. The club owners appealed this.

The Court of Appeal allowed this, overturning the EAT's decision. They recognised that the club did have a significant degree of control, but it was not enough to say there was a contract of employment. For instance, she had a great deal of control over her appearance. The Court of Appeal accepted there was some mutuality of obligation too. However, this was only for a few nights a week, with nothing preventing her from working at other clubs on her nights off. As such, they concluded that there was no contract of employment, and Ms Quashie could have no claim of unfair dismissal.

== Significance ==
Quashie was partly overruled in Robinson v HRH Al Qasimi [2021] EWCA Civ 862, in relation to comments affecting the illegality doctrine that were inconsistent with Patel v Mirza. The main ruling in Quashie, that the claimant was not an employee, has been subjected to extensive criticism, including for failing to properly apply the principle and test in Autoclenz Ltd v Belcher.

== See also ==
- United Kingdom labour law
- Employment contract in English law
- Uber BV v Aslam
