= James v Redcats (Brands) Ltd =

UK legal case

- Court: Employment Appeal Tribunal
- Decided: 21 February 2007
- Citations: [2007] UKEAT 0475_06_2102, [2007] ICR 1006, [2007] IRLR 296

Case opinions
- Elias J

Keywords
- Minimum wage, worker

James v Redcats (Brands) Ltd [2007] IRLR 296 is a legal case in the United Kingdom on the definition of a worker under the National Minimum Wage Act 1998. The Employment Appeal Tribunal held that a lack of "mutuality of obligation" does not affect the status of being an employee, and therefore coverage under the 1998 Act.

== Facts ==
Ms James worked for Redcats (Brands) Ltd, a postal company, as a courier. She was making a claim that she was not being paid a minimum wage, and as a preliminary point, it needed to be determined whether she was a "worker" under s 54(3) of the 1998 Act. Redcats argued that she was "self-employed" and therefore not protected by the legislation.

Ms James used her own car to deliver parcels. Redcats set delivery deadlines and gave detailed instructions on how to carry out her duties. The first tribunal held there was only a contract for services (i.e. self-employed) not of service (i.e. not a 'worker') because there was no so called "mutuality of obligation". Redcats did not promise her any particular amount of work, said the tribunal, and she could always decline it. At the Employment Appeal Tribunal, Ms James argued this was simply untrue and there was an obligation to accept work.

== Judgment ==
Elias J found in favour of Ms James. She was indeed a worker, and even if there was a lack of mutuality of obligation, this did not matter to the status of a person when work was being done. Even if a person is doing small contractual stints, and there was no overarching contract, there could still be an employment relationship (following McMeechan v Secretary of State for Employment [1997] ICR 549).

The case was remitted to the tribunal, on this guidance, to determine the case afresh.

The case also confirmed that "a home worker need not work at home, although typically he or she will do so; the only requirement is to work in a place not under the control or management of the other party".

== See also ==
- UK labour law
