= Secretary of State for Foreign and Commonwealth Affairs v Rahmatullah =

2012 UK constitutional law case

Foreign Secretary v Rahmatullah
- Court: Supreme Court of the United Kingdom
- Decided: 31 October 2012
- Citation: [2012] UKSC 48
- Transcript

Case history
- Prior action: [2011] EWCA Civ 1540; [2012] EWCA Civ 182

Court membership
- Judges sitting: Lord Phillips, Lady Hale, Lord Kerr, Lord Dyson, Lord Wilson, Lord Reed, Lord Carnwath

Secretary of State for Foreign and Commonwealth Affairs v Yunus Rahmatullah [2012] UKSC 48 is a UK constitutional law case concerning the detention of Yunus Rahmatullah, a Pakistani citizen detained in Iraq, and later Afghanistan, who is alleged to have travelled to Iraq to fight for Al-Qaeda during the Second Iraq War.

== Background ==
Yunus Rahmatullah is a Pakistani citizen who was suspected of having travelled to Iraq to become a fighter for Al-Qaeda. He was detained in Iraq by British Special Air Service (SAS) forces in 2004, during the United States' occupation of Iraq. He was transferred to US military custody. Initially, the US authorities held him in a prison in Iraq, but subsequently, he was transferred to a US-operated prison in Afghanistan without the knowledge of the UK government. These actions were contrary to a 2003 memorandum of understanding between the US and UK, which provided that persons captured in Iraq by the UK and later transferred to US custody could not be subsequently taken out of Iraq without agreement from the UK and that detained persons captured by the UK and transferred to US custody would be returned to the UK upon UK request. On behalf of Rahmatullah, lawyers from the human rights group Reprieve argued that the UK government should apply pressure on the US government to release him and that a writ of habeas corpus ad subjiciendum et recipiendum issued by the Court of Appeal should apply to him based on the memorandum of understanding. Lawyers for the UK government argued that they had no power to direct the United States to release Rahmatullah.

== Judgment ==
The Supreme Court ruled that the detention of Rahamatullah at the US Bagram prison in Afghanistan was unlawful and at least prima facie a breach of Article 49 of the Geneva Convention.

The, presumably forcible, transfer of Mr Rahmatullah from Iraq to Afghanistan is, at least prima facie, a breach of article 49. On that account alone, his continued detention post-transfer is unlawful.

However, by a 5–2 majority the Supreme Court of the United Kingdom dismissed the appeal of the human rights group Reprieve, stating:

The majority accepts that there were shortcomings in the letter from the US Defense Department dated 8 February 2012 in that it did not address either of the grounds on which the UK appeared to have a right to demand his transfer back into its custody. But, in the view of the majority, the Court of Appeal was entitled to treat the letter as a refusal by the US to transfer him back to the UK and therefore to consider that it had become clear that the UK government did not have the control over his detention which would have justified some further order against it.

However, in a dissenting judgment Lady Hale and Lord Carnwath stated: "Where liberty is at stake, it is not the court's job to speculate as to the political sensitivities which may be in play."

== Criticism ==
Writing in The Guardian the journalist and lawyer Joshua Rozenberg praised the dissenting judgment of Lady Hale and Lord Carnwath, arguing that the British government should have tried harder to secure Yunus Rahmatullah's release. Mr Rahmatullah remained in detention in Afghanistan at Bagram Air Base until his release on 15 May 2014.
