= Ravat v Halliburton Manufacturing and Services Ltd =

Ravat v Halliburton Ltd
- Court: Supreme Court
- Citation: [2012] UKSC 1

Keywords
- Conflict of laws, employment

Ravat v Halliburton Manufacturing and Services Ltd [2012] UKSC 1 is a UK labour law case, concerning the test for when workers are covered by employment rights when they work abroad.

== Facts ==
Mr Ravat worked for Halliburton Ltd, one of 70 subsidiaries in the Halliburton Inc group, from 1990 to 2006 as the Libyan accounts manager, where he reported to the Operations Manager, or to the Africa Region Finance Manager, Mr Strachan, based in Cairo. He was made redundant and claimed unfair dismissal in the Aberdeen Employment Tribunal. Halliburton argued they had no jurisdiction, because Mr Ravat worked in Libya. He spent 28 days there, and came back home to Preston for 28 days, travel paid by Halliburton, when he only checked the odd email, as under the ‘International Commuter Assignment Policy’. He had the same pay, tax and pension structure as UK employees, and was told in 2003 when he started in Libya that UK employment law would still govern the relationship. He was told he could pursue the UK grievance procedure over the redundancy. Mr Strachan took the dismissal decision under the Aberdeen human resources’ department's guidance, and the hearing was carried out in Aberdeen and the redundancy payment made like under UK law.

The Aberdeen Employment Tribunal, Mr RG Christie, held they did have jurisdiction to consider Mr Ravat's claim. The EAT, Lady Smith held that Mr Ravat did not have the right to be heard in the UK. The Court of Session held, by a majority, that Mr Ravat fell under ERA 1996 s 94. Lord Osborne held he was a peripatetic worker. Lord Carloway held he was an expatriate worker, but had a close connection with the UK. Lord Brodie, dissenting, held he was an expatriate worker, and did not have a close connection with the UK.

== Judgment ==
Lord Hope held even if the place of work and business is not in the UK, English law can still apply if it is the most closely connected law. Lady Hale, Lord Brown, Lord Mance and Lord Kerr expressed their agreement.

4. ... As Louise Merrett, The Extra-Territorial Reach of Employment Legislation (2010) 39 Industrial Law Journal 355, has pointed out, increasing labour mobility together with the proliferation of multinational companies and groups of companies has made the international aspects of employment law important in an ever-growing number of cases...

28. The reason why an exception can be made in those cases is that the connection between Great Britain and the employment relationship is sufficiently strong to enable it to be presumed that, although they were working abroad, Parliament must have intended that section 94(1) should apply to them. The expatriate cases that Lord Hoffmann identified as falling within its scope were referred to by him as exceptional cases: para 36. This was because, as he said in para 36, the circumstances would have to be unusual for an employee who works and is based abroad to come within the scope of British labour legislation. It will always be a question of fact and degree as to whether the connection is sufficiently strong to overcome the general rule that the place of employment is decisive. The case of those who are truly expatriate because they not only work but also live outside Great Britain requires an especially strong connection with Great Britain and British employment law before an exception can be made for them.

30. It is true that at the time of his dismissal the respondent was working in Libya and that the operations that were being conducted there and in which he worked were those of a different Halliburton associated company which was incorporated and based in Germany. It is true also that the decision to dismiss him was taken by Mr Strachan who was based in Cairo. But I would not attach as much importance to these details as I would have done if the company for which the respondent was working in Libya was not another associated Halliburton company. The vehicles which a multinational corporation uses to conduct its business across international boundaries depend on a variety of factors which may deflect attention from the reality of the situation in which the employee finds himself. As Mr Christie said in the employment tribunal, it is notorious that the employees of one company within the group may waft to another without alteration to their essential function in pursuit of the common corporate purpose: para 53. All the other factors point towards Great Britain as the place with which, in comparison with any other, the respondent's employment had the closer connection.

31. The appellant's business was based in Great Britain. It was to provide tools, services and personnel to the oil industry. That was why it sent the respondent to Libya, even though the actual work itself was in the furtherance of the business of another Halliburton subsidiary or associate company: see the employment tribunal's judgment, para 53. It chose to treat him as a commuter for this purpose, with a rotational working pattern familiar to workers elsewhere in the oil industry which enables them to spend an equivalent amount of time at home in Great Britain as that spent offshore or overseas. In the respondent's case this meant that all the benefits for which he would have been eligible had he been working in Great Britain were preserved for him.

32. Lady Smith said in the EAT that the employment tribunal was wrong to take account of the proper law of the parties' contract and the reassurance given to the respondent by the appellant about the availability to him of UK employment law, as neither of them were relevant. The better view, I think, is that, while neither of these things can be regarded as determinative, they are nevertheless relevant. Of course, it was not open to the parties to contract into the jurisdiction of the employment tribunal. As Mr Cavanagh put it, the parties cannot alter the statutory reach of section 94(1) by an estoppel based on what they agreed to. The question whether the tribunal has jurisdiction will always depend on whether it can be held that Parliament can reasonably be taken to have intended that an employee in the claimant's position should have the right to take his claim to an employment tribunal. But, as this is a question of fact and degree, factors such as any assurance that the employer may have given to the employee and the way the employment relationship is then handled in practice must play a part in the assessment.

33. The assurances that were given in the respondent's case were made in response to his understandable concern that his position under British employment law might be compromised by his assignment to Libya. The documentation he was given indicated that it was the appellant's intention that the relationship should be governed by British employment law. This was borne out in practice, as matters relating to the termination of his employment were handled by the appellant's human resources department in Aberdeen. This all fits into a pattern, which points quite strongly to British employment law as the system with which his employment had the closest connection.

34. Mr Cavanagh submitted that the fact that the respondent's home was in Great Britain was of no relevance. Why, he said, should the place where you are living when you are not working be relevant at all? All that mattered was the place where he was working. His place of residence did not matter, and it should be left out of account. It is true that his place of work was in Libya and not in Preston. But the fact that his home was in Great Britain cannot be dismissed as irrelevant. It was the reason why he was given the status of a commuter, with all the benefits that were attached to it which, as he made clear, he did not want to be prejudiced by his assignment. Here too the fact that his home was in Preston fits into a pattern which had a very real bearing on the parties' employment relationship.

35. As the question is ultimately one of degree, considerable respect must be given to the decision of the employment tribunal as the primary fact-finder. Mr Christie said in para 54 of his judgment that his conclusion that the balance was in favour of the respondent fell within the band of reasonable responses available to a reasonable chairman of employment tribunals. This remark was seen by both Lady Smith in para 36 of her judgment in the EAT and by Lord Osborne in the Extra Division, 2011 SLT 44, para 19 as an indication that he considered the task that he was undertaking as the exercise of a discretion. His remark was perhaps not very well chosen, but I do not think that his judgment when read as a whole is open to this criticism. The test which he applied was whether there was a substantial connection with Great Britain: see paras 39 and 47. It would have been better if he had asked himself whether the connection was sufficiently strong to enable it to be said that Parliament would have regarded it as appropriate for the tribunal to deal with the claim: see para 29, above. But I think that it is plain from his reasoning that he would have reached the same conclusion if he had applied that test. Lord Osborne said in para 20 of his opinion that the tribunal reached a conclusion that it was entitled to reach and that it was a correct conclusion. I agree with that assessment. So I too would hold that section 94(1) must be interpreted as applying to the respondent's employment, and that the employment tribunal has jurisdiction to hear his claim.

== See also ==
- UK labour law
