= Ministry of Defence v AB =

2012 English tort law case

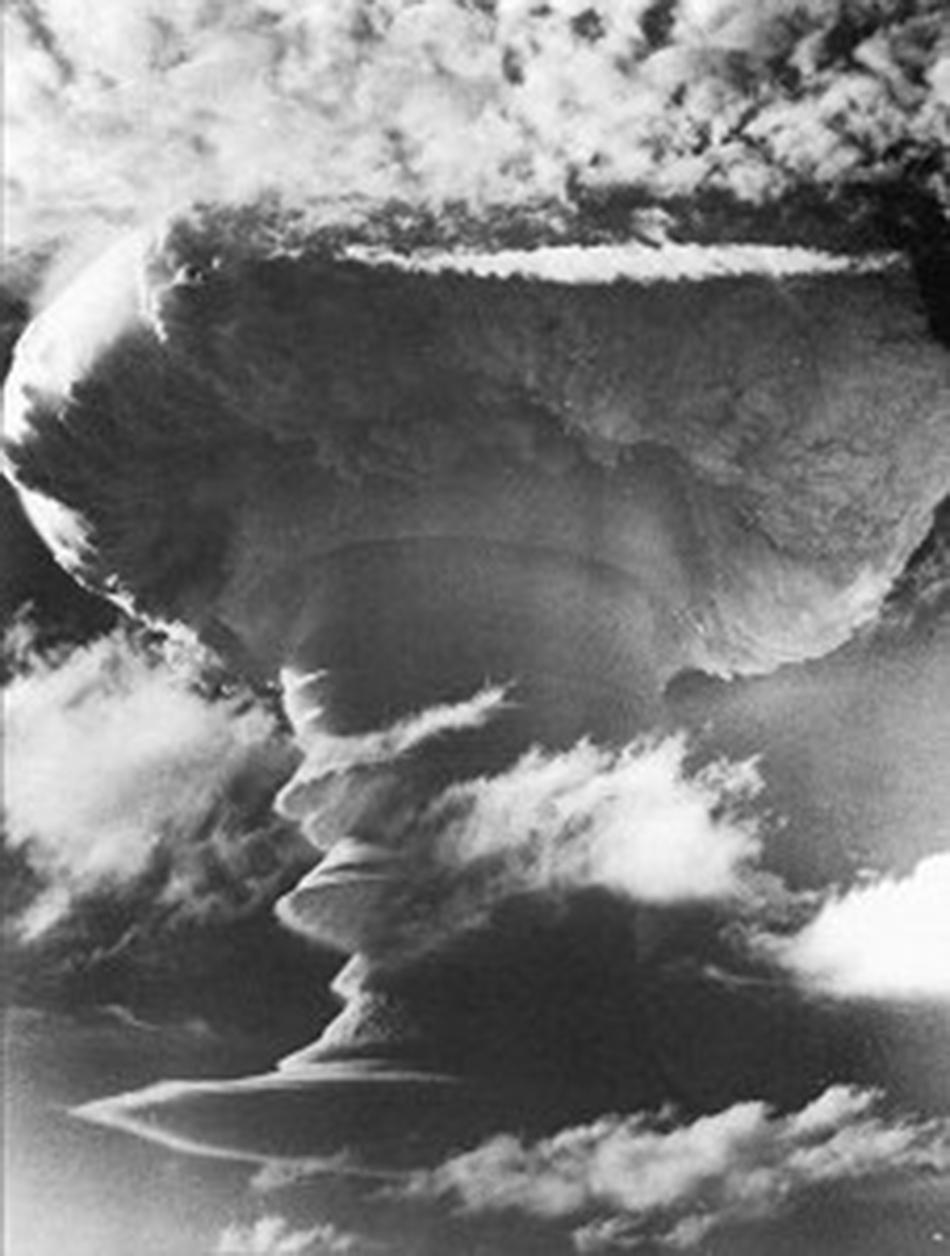
- Grapple X hydrogen bomb test at Kiritimati
- Court: UK Supreme Court
- Citation: [2012] UKSC 9

Ministry of Defence v AB [2012] UKSC 9 is an English tort law case, concerning causation, and material increase in risk.

== Facts ==
British Armed Forces claimants argued that exposure to fallout from 21 nuclear bombs in the South Pacific from 1952 to 1958 increased the risk of illnesses they suffered. Radiation materially increased the risk of their diseases. MoD argued the claims were barred under the Limitation Act 1980 section 11(4). A group litigation order was made and 10 lead cases from 1,011 claimants were chosen, main claims issued in 2004. There were appeals on the extent of the MoD's knowledge, whether proceedings could start before the MoD acquired knowledge, and whether there was a time bar, or discretion under LA 1980 section 33 to let the claims proceed.

In the High Court, Foskett J held no claims were time barred, 5 of 10 had no requisite knowledge till 3 years before the claim, and other 5 should proceed under LA 1980 s 33. The Court of Appeal held claimants had knowledge to trigger claims before 3 years.

== Judgment ==
The Supreme Court held 4 to 3 the claims were time barred in 9 of 10 cases, and it was not appropriate to let claims proceed on a discretionary basis.

Lord Wilson said that before three years of issuing the claim, the claimants reasonably believed their injuries were capable of being attributable to the nuclear tests, because they had said so publicly many times. In any case, the claimants have great difficulty in establishing causation, applying section 11 would be absurd only for a claim to be struck out.

Lord Brown said the claimant has to verify in his claim form that he ‘believes’ facts stated in them are true, and on causation said the following:

75. The plain fact is that, despite decades spent urgently trying to assemble a viable case, on the evidence as it presently stands these claims (in which huge costs have already been expended) are doomed to fail. As the claimants' then leading counsel readily accepted in argument for the Court of Appeal, "We haven't got material which gets you near a balance of probabilities" so that "a further policy exception" (to the Fairchild exception) would be needed to allow for a claim based merely on a material increase in risk – a development of which, in the light of this court's judgments in Sienkiewicz v Greif [2011] 2 AC 229, Lord Phillips at para 157 rightly recognised there to be "no foreseeable possibility".’

Lord Mance gave a concurring opinion.

85. Nor did the claimants originally try to do so in the present case. They pleaded a case of conventional causation. However, shortly before and at trial, the case run acknowledged in effect that causation could not be established as a matter of probability. The argument then was that a material increase in risk was sufficient. The hope was to invoke the principle or an extension of the principles in Bonnington Castings Ltd v Wardlaw [1956] AC 613 and/or Fairchild v Glenhaven Funeral Services Ltd [2002] UKHL 22, [2003] 1 AC 32. That was and is, however, a hope without prospect of success. During the trial of the present issue, the emphasis shifted to an attempt to show that, by the time of any trial on the merits, the claimants could hope to have acquired evidence to show causation by reference to a balance of probability or a doubling of risk or a synergical effect. 86. As matters stand, the claimants clearly have no case on causation. But that is no answer in my opinion to their limitation problems...

Lord Phillips dissented, but doubted they could establish causation.

156. The most that can be deduced from the Rowland report is that it is probable that individual veterans were exposed to low level fall-out. There is currently no evidence that there is any correlation between the raised incidence of chromosome translocation of individual New Zealand veterans and the incidence of cancer or any of the other conditions of which the claimant veterans complain. Nor is not suggested that the aberrant chromosomes identified by the mFISH assay could themselves have had a mechanistic link in the contraction of cancer, although there is an established mechanistic link between some chromosome aberrations and cancer. 157. The most that the veterans as a group are currently in a position to establish is that there is a possibility that some of them were exposed to a raised, albeit low level, of fall-out radiation and that this may have increased the risk of contracting some at least of the injuries in respect of which they claim. This falls well short of establishing causation according to established principles of English law. Foskett J was prepared to contemplate the possibility that the Supreme Court would extend the principle in Fairchild v Glenhaven Funeral Services Ltd [2002] UKHL 22; [2003] 1 AC 32 so as to equate causing an increase of risk with causing injury. The Court of Appeal at para 154 held that there was no foreseeable possibility of this. In the light of the observations of this Court in Sienkiewicz v Greif [2011] UKSC 10; [2011] 2 AC 229 the Court of Appeal was plainly correct.

Lady Hale dissented saying a claimant's subjective belief is no sensible basis for deciding whether a claim is time-barred.

Lord Kerr gave another dissenting opinion.

== See also ==
- English tort law
