= Royal Mail Group Ltd v Communication Workers Union =

- Court: Court of Appeal
- Citation: [2009] EWCA Civ 1045, [2010] ICR 83

Keywords
- Transfer of undertakings

Royal Mail Group Ltd v Communication Workers Union [2009] EWCA Civ 1045 is a UK labour law case concerning transfers of undertakings, and the job security rights of employees.

== Facts ==
Royal Mail was selling some of its branches to private companies under a franchising arrangement. Royal Mail thought that no automatic transfer took place under TUPER 2006 regulation 4 when workers went to the franchisee. It therefore refused to offer this option to the employees (on top of what it was doing to relocate staff under mobility clauses and offer voluntary redundancy). The Communication Workers Union claimed that failing to make people aware was a breach of the obligation under TUPER 2006 regulation 13(2)(b) to inform about the legal, economic and social implications of the transfer.

Tribunal held that the Royal Mail was in breach because the Royal Mail did not genuinely believe it was not subject to TUPER 2006.

== Judgment ==
Elias P in the EAT said there was no evidence for an absence of such a belief and held that Royal Mail’s genuine, albeit mistaken, belief about the legal implications meant it was no longer subject or in breach of regulation 13(2)(b). CWU argued that r 13(2)(b) contained no reference to the subjective state of mind of the company. Royal Mail argued that any other construction would require employers to be warranting the legal accuracy of information provided where plainly they could not always be predictable.

Waller LJ, Hughes LJ and Rimer LJ held that no liability for the warranty of accurate statements arose, upholding the EAT.

== See also ==
- UK labour law
