= Seldon v Clarkson Wright & Jakes =

Seldon v Clarkson, Wright and Jakes
- Court: UK Supreme Court
- Citation: [2012] UKSC 16

Keywords
- Discrimination

Seldon v Clarkson, Wright and Jakes [2012] UKSC 16 is a UK labour law case, concerning the discrimination under what is now the Equality Act 2010.

== Facts ==
Mr Seldon, a partner, claimed direct age discrimination for being compulsorily retired after he turned 65. He joined the partnership in 1971, became an equity partner in 1972, and revised the partnership deed in 2005 which restated that partners would retire the December after turning age 65. He asked to stay, but was offered £30,000 to retire instead. He claimed age discrimination under EEAR 2006 regulation 17. The partnership argued it was justified by business need.

The Employment Tribunal held he was less favourably treated, but it was justified for (1) giving other associates the opportunity of partnership within a reasonable time – and therefore to remain with the firm (2) workforce planning (3) limiting need to expel underperforming partners. It upheld, however, a victimisation claim. The EAT, said although an aim of ‘collegiality’ was not legitimate, the decision could be right, although it would have to be remitted to decide afresh. It should have considered if another age would have been proportionate. The Court of Appeal dismissed his appeal. Mr Seldon argued that the justification had to relate to him, not the firm.

== Judgment ==
Lady Hale held that Mr Seldon had not suffered unjustifiable age discrimination, and rejected the claim that it could not be justified in relation to business need. However, it was remitted to Tribunal to decide whether, on the facts, an age of 65 was legitimate.

52. In Age Concern, the Court recorded the submission of the EU Commission that in article 6, the focus is on the legitimate aim pursued by the member state, whereas in article 2(2)(b) the focus is on whether the employer can justify his employment practices [57]. The Court did not expressly approve that, but it did say that the scope of the two is not identical [58] and that article 6 is addressed to member states [67]. (It is also worth noting that in Ingeniørforeningen i Danmark, Advocate General Kokott pointed out that the objectives which might be relied upon to justify direct discrimination, whether under article 6(1), 4(1) or 2(5), were "fewer than those capable of justifying an indirect difference in treatment, even though the proportionality test requirements are essentially the same" [AG31].)

53. But what exactly does this mean in practical terms? On the one hand, Luxembourg tells us that the choice of social policy aims is for the member states to make. It is easy to see why this should be so, given that the possible aims may be contradictory, in particular between promoting youth employment and prolonging the working life of older people. On the other hand, however, Luxembourg has sanctioned a generally worded provision such as regulation 3, which spells out neither the aims nor the means which may be justified. It is also easy to see why this should be so, given that the priority which might be attached to particular aims is likely to change with the economic, social and demographic conditions in the country concerned.

54. In Age UK, Blake J identified the state's aim, in relation both to regulation 3 and to the designated retirement age in regulation 30, as being to preserve the confidence and integrity of the labour market. This is not an easy concept to understand, and there is a risk that it might be taken as allowing employers to continue to do whatever suits them best. But it is, as Advocate General Bot observed in Kücükdeveci, difficult to see how granting flexibility to employers can be a legitimate aim in itself, as opposed to a means of achieving other legitimate aims. Furthermore, the Secretary of State accepts that there is a distinction between aims such as cost reduction and improving competitiveness, which would not be legitimate, and aims relating to employment policy, the labour market and vocational training, which would.

55. It seems, therefore, that the United Kingdom has chosen to give employers and partnerships the flexibility to choose which objectives to pursue, provided always that (i) these objectives can count as legitimate objectives of a public interest nature within the meaning of the Directive and (ii) are consistent with the social policy aims of the state and (iii) the means used are proportionate, that is both appropriate to the aim and (reasonably) necessary to achieve it.

56. Two different kinds of legitimate objective have been identified by the Luxembourg court. The first kind may be summed up as inter-generational fairness. This is comparatively uncontroversial. It can mean a variety of things, depending upon the particular circumstances of the employment concerned: for example, it can mean facilitating access to employment by young people; it can mean enabling older people to remain in the workforce; it can mean sharing limited opportunities to work in a particular profession fairly between the generations; it can mean promoting diversity and the interchange of ideas between younger and older workers.

57. The second kind may be summed up as dignity. This has been variously put as avoiding the need to dismiss older workers on the grounds of incapacity or underperformance, thus preserving their dignity and avoiding humiliation, and as avoiding the need for costly and divisive disputes about capacity or underperformance. Either way, it is much more controversial. As Age UK argue, the philosophy underlying all the anti-discrimination laws is the dignity of each individual, the right to be treated equally irrespective of either irrational prejudice or stereotypical assumptions which may be true of some but not of others. The assumptions underlying these objectives look suspiciously like stereotyping. Concerns about capacity, it is argued, are better dealt with, as they were in Wolf and Prigge under article 4(1), which enables them to be related to the particular requirements of the job in question.

[...]

65. I would accept that where it is justified to have a general rule, then the existence of that rule will usually justify the treatment which results from it. In the particular context of inter-generational fairness, it must be relevant that at an earlier stage in his life, a partner or employee may well have benefited from a rule which obliged his seniors to retire at a particular age. Nor can it be entirely irrelevant that the rule in question was re-negotiated comparatively recently between the partners. It is true that they did not then appreciate that the forthcoming Age Regulations would apply to them. But it is some indication that at the time they thought that it was fair to have such a rule. Luxembourg has drawn a distinction between laws and regulations which are unilaterally imposed and collective agreements which are the product of bargaining between the social partners on a presumably more equal basis (Rosenbladt, Hennigs).

66. There is therefore a distinction between justifying the application of the rule to a particular individual, which in many cases would negate the purpose of having a rule, and justifying the rule in the particular circumstances of the business. All businesses will now have to give careful consideration to what, if any, mandatory retirement rules can be justified.

Lord Hope, Lord Brown, Lord Mance and Lord Kerr.

== See also ==
- UK labour law
- European Union law
