= Durham v BAI (Run Off) Ltd =

- Court: UK Supreme Court
- Full case name: Durham v BAI (Run Off) Ltd (Employers’ Liability Insurance ‘Trigger’ Litigation)
- Citation: [2012] UKSC 14, [2012] 1 WLR 867

Durham v BAI (Run Off) Ltd [2012] UKSC 14 is an English tort law case, concerning causation between a breach of duty and damage.

== Facts ==
The question in the case was to what extent is an employer who liable to an employee that gets mesothelioma covered by insurance. This turned mainly on the words in insurance policies.

== Judgment ==
Lord Mance held that the policies covered liability for mesothelioma.

65. The cause of action exists because the defendant has previously exposed the victim to asbestos, because that exposure may have led to mesothelioma, not because it did, and because mesothelioma has been suffered by the victim.... 66. Another way to view a defendant responsible under the rule as an ‘insurer’, but that too is hardly a natural description of a liability which is firmly based on traditional conceptions of tort liability as rooted in fault.

Lord Phillips, dissenting, said the policies should not be held to cover liabilities at all because under the Fairchild exception the liability was for the risk of contracting mesothelioma, not for the mesothelioma itself. Policies did not cover liability for risk creation.

== Significance ==
In the 2002 case of Fairchild v Glenhaven Funeral Services Ltd, the House of Lords allowed for an exception to the normal principles of causation in English tort law to allow for recovery when a defendant has materially increased the risk of harm towards a claimant in cases of mesothelioma exposure. In 2006, in Barker v Corus (UK) plc, the Lords limited the applicability of this exception in cases where multiple employers are responsible but some have become insolvent (preventing claimants from holding the remaining solvent employer jointly and severally liable. Due to the political unpopularity of the decision in Barker, Parliament passed the Compensation Act 2006 to restore the previous broad Fairchild exception in mesothelioma cases (but not in other cases). In Durham, the Supreme Court applied the post-2006 statutory position to insurers.

== See also ==
- English tort law
- Barker v Corus (UK) plc
- Fairchild v Glenhaven Funeral Services Ltd
- Causation in English law
