= Clyde & Co LLP v Bates van Winkelhof =

UK labour law case

- Court: UK Supreme Court

Keywords
- Worker status

Clyde & Co LLP v Bates van Winkelhof [2014] UKSC 32 is a UK labour law case, concerning the scope of protection for workers.

== Facts ==
The claimant solicitor worked for a law firm named Shadbolt & Co LLP that was involved in joint ventures with two different Tanzanian law firms. Some of Shadbolt's operations were taken over by Clyde & Co including the Tanzanian joint venture, and the claimant was offered a position as a partner at Clyde & Co, but she would also continue working with the Tanzanian joint venture firm. Revenue from the Tazanian joint venture would inform Clyde & Co's determination of whether to offer her a higher level of equity in the partnership.

The claimant reported to the firm that a managing partner of the Tazanian law firm had been involved in bribery. She stated this was a protected disclosure under the Public Interest Disclosure Act 1998, and that she had suffered detriments from this including being expelled from the LLP. She brought a claim in the employment tribunal alleging sex discrimination contrary to the Equality Act 2010 and a breach of the Employment Rights Act 1996 concerning whistleblowers.

At first instance, the employment tribunal held she was not a "worker" for the LLP. The Employment Appeal Tribunal found that she was a worker.

The Court of Appeal found that the appellant was not a 'worker' for the purposes of the Employment Rights Act 1996 by applying s4(4) of the Limited Liability Partnerships Act 2000:

A member of a limited liability partnership shall not be regarded for any purpose as employed by the limited liability partnership unless, if he and the other members were partners in a partnership, he would be regarded for that purpose as employed by the partnership.

Prior case law had established that a partner in a limited liability partnership was not an employee but not whether a partner was or was not a worker for the purposes of employment law.

== Judgment ==
The Supreme Court decided that Ms van Winkelhof was a worker.

In my view, the appellant clearly is a "worker" within the meaning of section 230(3)(b) of the Employment Rights Act 1996 and entitled to claim the protection of its whistle-blowing provisions. That conclusion is to my mind entirely consistent with the underlying policy of those provisions, which some might think is particularly applicable to businesses and professions operating within the tightly regulated fields of financial and legal services. The appeal must be allowed and the case remitted to the employment tribunal to determine her claim under those provisions along with her sex discrimination claim.

Lord Carnwath concurred and Lord Clarke dissented.

== See also ==
- United Kingdom labour law
- Aslam v Uber BV (2016) Case no: 2202550/2015
