= Scots family law =

Scots family law is the body of laws in Scotland which regulate certain aspects of adult relationships and the rights and obligations in respect of children.

== Marriage and civil partnership ==
=== Marriage ===
There are two types of recognised marriage in Scotland, informal and formal. Both are equally valid under Scots law but, as of 4 May 2006, only formal marriages can now be contracted in Scotland.

Before the Marriage (Scotland) Act 1939, Scots law, following the principles of canon law, recognised three types of informal marriage. Marriage per verba de praesenti was constituted where the parties, without any need of a witness, made a mutual declaration to take each other as husband and wife. Marriage per verba de futuro subsequente copula was constituted when the parties, having agreed to marry on a future date, had sex. It has not been possible to form either of these irregular marriages since 1 July 1940. Marriage by cohabitation with habit and repute was constituted when the parties agreed to live together as husband and wife and were generally reputed to be married amongst those who knew them well. It has not been possible to form this type of marriage since 4 May 2006 but such marriages that were created before that day continue to be valid, as well as some after in certain narrow circumstances.

Formal marriages are created under and according to the requirements of the Marriage (Scotland) Act 1977. A formal marriage may be formed through either a religious ceremony or a civil ceremony, but both must generally comply with the same procedural requirements. First, the parties must submit what is known as a "marriage notice" to the district registrar responsible for the area they intend to be married in along with birth certificates for each party. The district registrar will then enter the parties' details and the proposed date of the marriage in the local marriage notice book, which gives the public an opportunity to object to the marriage. In order to allow a sufficient amount of time for potential objections to be filed, there is normally a 14-day waiting period between the day the marriage notice is received and the parties can marry, although the registrar can shorten this period in exceptional circumstances. After the 14-day waiting period and the registrar has determined that there are no legal impediments to the marriage, he will issue what is known as the "marriage schedule". If the parties intend to have a religious ceremony, the marriage schedule acts as a licence authorising the celebrant to proceed, in which case the registrar will only issue it 7 days before the ceremony. If after 3 months no marriage schedule is issued because no religious ceremony is to occur, the registrar can require the parties to start again with a new marriage notice.

==== Civil ceremony ====
If the parties choose to have a non-religious ceremony, the district registrar will retain the marriage schedule. The ceremony is normally conducted by the district registrar at his or her office or at another government approved location in the district. The registrar may also conduct the ceremony anywhere in their district if one of the parties is suffering from a serious illness or injury.

==== Religious ceremony ====
A religious ceremony is performed by a person who has been legally authorised by the government to sanction the marriage. The marriage schedule acts as a licence legally authorising the person to sanction the marriage. A religious ceremony may only be performed by (1) a minister of the Church of Scotland, (2) a priest or other marriage celebrant of a religious body prescribed by regulations made by the Secretary of State, (3) another person nominated by a religious body and registered with the Registrar General of Births, Deaths and Marriages, or (4) any other person over the age of 21 who is temporarily authorised by the Registrar General. After the ceremony, the parties sign the marriage schedule, which must be returned to the district registrar within three days of the ceremony.

==== Legal impediments to marriage ====
There are six defined impediments to both regular and irregular marriage:

- the parties are too closely related;
- one of the parties is already married;
- one or both of the parties is under the age of sixteen;
- one or both of the parties legally lacks capacity to understand or consent to the marriage;
- one or both of the parties are domiciled in another legal jurisdiction and the party is impeded from marrying on another ground in that jurisdiction; or,
- the marriage is a sham marriage.

If any of these impediments exist when the marriage is solemnised it will make the marriage void. It is not possible for a person under the age of sixteen to marry, even with parental consent. A party who lacks the capacity to understand or consent to a marriage cannot marry, although legal precedent in Scotland has established that it would take a significant degree of lack of understanding or diminished intelligence before the marriage would be considered void. Extreme intoxication due to alcohol or drugs has been accepted as grounds by courts in the past. Other legal grounds to claim a contract is void under Scots contract law, such as error, have less scope in regards to marriage. For example, a marriage contract is an exception to the general rule in Scots law that an error held by one of the parties induced by the fraudulent misrepresentation of the other makes the contract void. So, a marriage would not be void where a man married a woman because she told him she was pregnant with his child and actually she was not pregnant at all.

The only recognised ground where a marriage is voidable (i.e. the marriage exists until it is made void through a court order) is the incurable impotency of either spouse. The impotency must have existed at the time the marriage was solemnised and continue to exist at the time that a declarator of nullity is sought. Impotency in this case is distinguished from sterility and a refusal to have sex, both of which do not make the marriage voidable.

In the situation that a marriage is void or voidable, any legitimately interested party (usually one of the parties to the marriage) can seek a declarator of nullity of marriage from the Court of Session, which will acknowledge that their marriage is void and, in effect, never existed. When making such a ruling the judge has the power to make awards for financial provision, like in a divorce.

=== Civil partnership ===
The Civil Partnership Act 2004 created the status of civil partnership across the United Kingdom. It is distinct from marriage, although the rights and obligations between them are largely the same. The main difference between the two is that a civil partnership must be created through a civil ceremony.

The procedural requirements to create a civil partnership are largely the same as a marriage, except that the marriage notice is replaced with a "notice of proposed civil partnership" and the marriage schedule is replaced with a "civil partnership schedule". The proposed civil partnership is advertised and a 14-day waiting period for objections from the public applies. The district registrar has determined there are no legal impediment to the civil partnership will issue the civil partnership schedule after the 14-day waiting period elapsed.

The civil ceremony to create the civil partnership may occur at the district registrar's office or any other location within the relevant district agreed between the parties and the district registrar. The ceremony, however, cannot take place in religious premises. The parties, two witnesses over the age of sixteen and the district registrar will sign the civil partnership schedule and it will then be registered by the district registrar.

==== Legal impediments to civil partnership ====
There are five legal impediments to forming a civil partnership in Scotland:

- the parties are not the same sex;
- the parties are too closely related;
- one or both of the parties are under the age of sixteen;
- one or both of the parties are married or in a civil partnership; or,
- one or both of the parties are incapable of understanding or consenting to forming a civil partnership.

If any of these impediments exist when the civil partnership is created it will be void. In Scotland, there are no grounds which will make a civil partnership voidable. If a civil partnership is formed in England and Wales or Northern Ireland and the civil partnership is voidable in those jurisdictions, it will also be voidable in Scotland.

== Divorce and dissolution ==
=== Divorce ===
Divorce, the legal process by which a marriage is brought to an end, is now regulated by the Divorce (Scotland) Act 1976 as amended by the Family Law (Scotland) Act 2006, which provides two legal grounds for divorce: the, "irretrievable breakdown of the marriage" or where one party has undergone gender reassignment surgery and obtained an interim gender recognition certificate. Irretrievable breakdown is proved by one of the parties to the marriage showing that one or more defined circumstances exist. This eliminates the need for the judge to conduct an intimate examination of the relationship between the parties. There are "fault" and "no fault" grounds provided in the Act, and the speed at which a divorce can be obtained will be determined by what circumstances are relied on in the divorce proceedings. It is not possible for both parties to submit a joint petition for divorce, divorce cases must always have a person seeking the divorce (the pursuer) and a person arguing against the divorce (the defender).

The circumstances that will lead to a finding by the court that there is an irretrievable breakdown of the marriage are:

- the defender's adultery;
- behaviour of the defender that makes it unreasonable for the pursuer to live with the defender;
- not living as husband and wife for one year and there is consent to the divorce from both parties; and
- not living as husband and wife for two years when one party objects to the divorce.

==== Adultery and behaviour ====
If the pursuer establishes an irretrievable breakdown of the marriage on grounds of adultery or behaviour then they can obtain a divorce immediately, while the other grounds require some period of prior separation. Circumstantial evidence can be provided to support the claims of the pursuer and the case is determined "on the balance of probability" rather than "beyond a reasonable doubt". Therefore, for example, evidence of a husband staying in a hotel room with another woman for a night will likely establish adultery, even if sexual intercourse cannot be proved. The pursuer cannot seek a divorce based on their own adultery and the adulterous sexual intercourse committed by the defender must have been voluntary. To found a divorce on the behaviour of the defender the behaviour must be such as a reasonable person could not be expected to live with the defender. The behaviour can be from one event, though showing a pattern is more likely to convince the court, and it is irrelevant if the behaviour is passive or active or caused by a mental abnormality. There is no exact list of what behaviour will constitute grounds and the case law is filled with different examples. The finding by the court that the defender is at "fault" for the divorce will, however, not affect the amount of financial provision awarded or arrangements regarding any children.

==== Separation ====
If the parties have not lived together as husband and wife for a period of one year and both parties consent to the divorce then this establishes an irretrievable breakdown of the marriage. The defender's consent to the divorce must be granted at the court proceedings and can be withheld for any reason or no reason at all. According to Stair, the defender to a divorce will often use their granting of consent as a way of bargaining favourable financial provision or arrangements concerning children.

If the defender does not consent to the divorce, then the pursuer will only be able to establish an irretrievable breakdown of the marriage once the couple has not lived together as husband and wife for two years.

==== Issuing a decree of divorce ====
The court will suspend divorce proceedings if there is reason to believe that a reconciliation between the parties is possible. The court can also delay issuing a decree for divorce where one of the parties will be prevented from remarrying on religious grounds and the other party is able to take steps to prevent this impediment from arising, such as through a religious annulment of the marriage. Once the impediment is removed the court will then issue the divorce decree.

=== Dissolution ===
Dissolution, the legal process by which a civil partnership is brought to an end, is regulated by the Civil Partnership Act 2004, which provides two legal grounds for dissolution: the "irretrievable breakdown of the civil partnership" or where one party has undergone gender reassignment surgery and obtained an interim gender recognition certificate. The grounds to establish the existence of an irretrievable breakdown of the civil partnership are the same as divorce, except for adultery. Adultery, as a legal concept, can only take place between a male and female, but if a party in a civil partnership had sexual relations with another person this would fall under the behavioural ground for dissolution. The finding by the court that the defender is at "fault" for the dissolution will, however, not affect the amount of financial provision awarded or arrangements regarding any children.

As with divorce proceedings, the court will suspend dissolution proceedings where the court has reason to believe that a reconciliation between the parties is possible.

=== Financial provision ===
While a couple are married or in a civil partnership they owe an obligation to financially support one another called "aliment". Aliment, as a legal obligation, can be enforced by the court up until the point that the marriage is brought to an end by divorce or the civil partnership is dissolved. The amount of aliment owed and the amount that a court will consider awarding depends on the needs and resources of the parties, the earning capacities of the parties and the general circumstances of the situation.

In the event of a decree of divorce or dissolution of a civil partnership being issued by a court, the court will also consider how the shared property and assets of the couple are to be divided. The Family Law (Scotland) Act 1985 sets out detailed provisions on what assets the court can deal with and what considerations are to be taken into account when making any award. Once there is a divorce or dissolution the couple no longer are obliged to provide aliment to each other. The court, however, can make an order for a periodical allowance in certain circumstances, but such orders are more difficult to obtain as they go against the Family Law (Scotland) Act 1985's principle of a "clean break". Other orders such as capital sum payments, transfer of property and orders relating to pension benefits are utilised by the court to reduce the need for future periodical payments of support.

== Cohabitation ==
Couples who live together but are not married or in a civil partnership have very limited legal obligations and rights. According to the Scottish Government it is a common misunderstanding in Scotland that a couple will have established a common-law marriage after having lived together for a certain period of time. The last form of irregular marriage, marriage by cohabitation with habit and repute, was abolished from 4 May 2006 and required more than just living together. The confusion could be caused by the continued existence of this type of common law marriage in a number of US states.

The Family Law (Scotland) Act 2006 introduced new rights and obligations concerning cohabiting couples. For the purposes of the 2006 Act, a cohabiting couple is a couple (either opposite sex or same sex) who live together as if they were married or in a civil partnership. There is no minimum amount of time specified that a couple must live together before they can be considered to be cohabiting, but the court will consider the amount of time as a factor when deciding whether they were living as if they were married or in a civil partnership.

The 2006 Act creates a legal presumption that each party will have an equal share in household goods (excluding motor vehicles and money) acquired during the cohabitation. The parties are also presumed to have an equal share in any allowance or account created for joint household expenses.

Cohabiting couples also have limited rights which focus on their shared home. If the home is held under a lease the cohabitant has a right to continue living in the property and being a party to the lease if their cohabiting partner dies. If one party owns the home that they share the other party can apply to the court for the right to occupy the home in the event that the relationship breaks down. This right can also be used in certain circumstances to block the party who owns the property from selling it and stop a bank from repossessing the home under a mortgage.

=== Financial provision ===
Cohabiting couples do not have a legal obligation to financially support one another like in a marriage or civil partnership. However, in the event of a breakdown of a cohabiting couple's relationship, one party can ask the court to make an order for financial provision in certain circumstances similar to divorce and dissolution cases. The amount awarded will depend on how long the couple lived together, what their financial arrangements were, to what degree the defender has made an economic gain from cohabiting with the pursuer and whether the applicant has suffered an "economic disadvantage" in the interests of the defender. An application for financial provision must be made to the court within one year from when the couple ceased to cohabit.

== Children ==
=== Legal capacity ===
The age of legal capacity in Scotland is 16 but under Scots law other criteria, such as the child's level of maturity and understanding, will sometimes also be relevant. The law also recognises a number of other ages which are significant in different contexts.

The test to determine the legal capacity of a child will depend on the particular circumstances of the case and the law concerned. As a child ages their legal capacity develops:

- Under the age of 8 years old - a child cannot be held responsible for his or her actions under criminal law. Children (persons under the age of 16 years) will normally be dealt with utilising a Children's Hearing rather than a criminal court.
- 12 years old - a child can write a valid will and consent to or veto his or her own adoption. There is also a legal presumption that the child has sufficient understanding to express a view as to his or her own future arrangements and to instruct a solicitor.

There are also circumstances which are not connected directly to the child's age but to their maturity and understanding, such as:

- A child's liability under the law of Delict
- There is no fixed age at which a child is able to consent to medical treatment, instead the test is whether the child is able to understand the nature and possible consequences of the treatment.

=== Parental responsibilities ===
The law, in dealing with children, emphasises the importance of doing what is practicable and best for the interests of the child's welfare rather than the parents and this guides the regulatory structure surrounding parental rights and responsibilities. The Children (Scotland) Act 1995 introduced four parental responsibilities: (1) to safeguard and promote the child's health, development and welfare; (2) to provide, in a manner appropriate to the stage of development of the child: direction and guidance; (3) if the child is not living with the parent, to maintain personal relations and direct contact with the child on a regular basis; and (4) to act as the child's legal representative. The child, or anyone acting on behalf of the child, have title to bring legal proceedings to enforce a parental responsibility.

=== Parental rights ===
Parental rights exist to allow the individual or individuals responsible for the child to fulfil their parental responsibilities. Parental rights can only be exercised so far as practicable and in the best interests of the child. There are four recognised parental rights: (1) to have the child living with him or her or otherwise to regulate the child's residence; (2) to control, direct or guide, in a manner appropriate to the stage of development of the child, the child's upbringing; (3) if the child is not living with the parent, to maintain personal relations and direct contact with the child on a regular basis; and (4) to act as the child's legal representative. The list of parental rights, like parental responsibilities, supersedes the common law and therefore there is, "no room to argue that a parental right, say to physical chastisement exists beyond that found in the statutory rights listed above." The child, or anyone acting on behalf of the child, have title to bring legal proceedings to enforce a parental right. All parental rights are extinguished when the child turns 16 years old.

=== Who has parental responsibilities and rights ===
The birth mother of the child, even in cases of surrogacy, automatically acquires parental responsibilities and rights for her child. Only a father who is married to the mother at the time of conception or subsequently before the birth, automatically acquires parental responsibilities and rights. A non-marital father will not automatically acquire the responsibilities and rights even if he is the child's biological father. From 4 May 2006, with the introduction of the Family Law (Scotland) Act 2006, a father named on the child's birth certificate also automatically obtains responsibilities and rights. The Act only applies to births from 4 May 2006 and any previous births would have to be re-registered by both parents in order for the father to obtain legal status.

== See also ==
- Children's Hearings
- Judiciary of Scotland
