= Tesco Stores Ltd v Dundee City Council =

Tesco Stores Ltd v Dundee City Council [2012] UKSC 13 was a case before the Supreme Court of the United Kingdom in 2012 concerning planning permission in Scotland.

== Background ==
Tesco, a supermarket company had, in 2010, sought a judicial review of Dundee City Council's grant of planning permission to Asda, another supermarket company, on site within 800m of one of Tesco's stores. The Court of Sessions, both the Outer House and the Inner House had refused leave. Tesco claimed that the council had failed to properly apply the sequential test.

Tesco appealed to the Supreme Court.

== Arguments ==
Tesco said that where there was a dispute over the meaning of a policy in the development plan it was for courts to determine the meaning. A planning authority attaching meaning to words they were capable of bearing, made an error of law.

== Opinion ==
The court agreed that the meaning of words was a matter for courts while reiterating that policy statements should not be read as statutory or contractual wording would, and decisions were subject to planning judgment. The exercise of planning judgment could only be challenged because it was irrational or perverse.

An error in interpretation would only be material if there was a reasonable chance that it would have affected the outcome. The court was not convinced that this was the case.

The court dismissed the appeal.

== Use ==
R (Zurich Assurance Ltd t/a Threadneedle Property Investments) v North Lincolnshire Council [2012] EWHC 3708 (Admin), Hickinbottom J cited, at Para 61, both Lord Reed (aara 24 including "the question remains… whether an alternative site is suitable for the proposed development, not whether the proposed development can be altered or reduced so that it can be made to fit an alternative site" and Hope (Para 38 including "the issue of suitability is directed to the developer's proposals, not some alternative scheme which might be suggested" and "these criteria are designed for use in the real world"), in terms of understanding "suitability" in NPPF, a planning policy framework akin to the SPP considered by the Supreme Court.
