= McMeechan v Secretary of State for Employment =

- Court: Court of Appeal of England and Wales
- Decided: 11 December 1996
- Citations: [1996] EWCA Civ 1166, [1995] IRLR 461, [1997] IRLR 353

Case opinions
- Waite LJ, Potter LJ and McCowan LJ

Keywords
- Contract of employment

McMeechan v Secretary of State for Employment [1996] EWCA Civ 1166 is a UK labour law case concerning the scope of protection for people to employment rights. It took the view that an agency worker did have an employment contract for the purpose of claiming for unpaid wages on an employer's insolvency.

== Facts ==
Mr McMeechan claimed £105.17 for four days of unpaid wages from the National Insurance Fund, via the Secretary of State for Employment, after his employment agency went insolvent under the Employment Protection (Consolidation) Act 1978 section 122 (now the ERA 1996 section 182). Mr McMeechan worked as a caterer, through an employment agency named Noel Employment Ltd, for Sutcliffe Catering in Swindon. He had no written contract, but received a job description for each work assignment. He had agreed ‘to fulfil the normal common law duties which an employee would owe to an employer so far as they are applicable’ The Department of Employment refused his claim, saying he was an ‘independent contractor’.

The Employment Tribunal held he was not an employee, and so was not entitled to claim. Mummery J in the Employment Appeal Tribunal held he was an employee of the employment agency. The Secretary of State appealed.

== Judgment ==
Waite LJ held that Mr McMeechan was an employee of the agency for this period and so he could claim from the Secretary of State for unpaid wages.

THE SINGLE ENGAGEMENT CLAIM

A. Is it maintainable at all ?

[Counsel for the Secretary of State] Lord Meston's fundamental submission that no claim to single-stint employee status as between the temporary worker and the contractor is maintainable in law has already been stated. I would reject it for the following reasons:

(1) In a case like the present where the money claimed is related to a single stint served for one individual client, it is logical to relate the claim to employment status to the particular job of work in respect of which payment is being sought. I note that the editors of Harvey appear to take a similar view, where they suggest (at para A [53]):

".....the better view is not whether the casual worker is obliged to turn up for, or do, the work but rather if he turns up for, and does the work, whether he does so under a contract of service or for services."

(2) There is nothing inherently repugnant, whether to good relations in the workplace or in law, about a state of affairs under which, in an employment agency case, the status of employee of the agency is allocated to a temporary worker in respect of each assignment actually worked - notwithstanding that the same worker may not be entitled to employee status under his general terms of engagement....

(3) The force of (2) is not lost in cases where - following what appears to be a common (though potentially confusing) practice - the agency and the temporary worker have committed themselves to standard terms and conditions which are intended to apply both to the general engagement and to the individual stints worked under it. The only result of that fusion is that the same conditions will have to be interpreted from a different perspective, according to whether they are being considered in the context of the general engagement or in the context of a single assignment. That does not make the task of the tribunals any easier, and is liable to lead to the unsatisfactory consequence that the same condition may need to be given a different significance in the one context from that accorded to it in the other. Those disadvantages do not, however, supply any valid reason for denying the temporary worker or the contractor the right to have the issue of contractual status judged separately in the two contexts.

[...]

B The Merits of the Single Engagement Claim

The issue is whether the individual assignment worked by Mr McMeechan for Sutcliffe Caterers for a period of four days during January 1992, in respect of which he claims his unpaid remuneration, did or did not amount to a contract of service in its own right. That is a question which, though it remains essentially one of fact and degree (O'Kelly's case at page 124 and Lee v Chung [1990] IRLR 236) is one which largely falls to be determined on the interpretation of the Conditions.

Those must, however, be construed according to the context afforded by a specific, as opposed to a general, engagement. That requires them to be interpreted, in my judgment, as follows:

(1) The importation of common law duties by the latter part of condition 5 favours the inference of a contract of service, because even though the notional importation of a master servant relationship is expressed to apply in the first instance only as between the temporary worker and the client, the sub-paragraphs of the condition contain a number of instances where there is a duality of duty owed both to the client and to the contractor....

(2) The conditions (3, 6, 9 and the first sentence of 5) excluding mutuality of obligation are irrelevant in this context. That is not to say that in the different context of a general engagement they would be without effect. They might there turn out to be of crucial - even decisive - importance. In the circumstances of a specific engagement, however, there is nothing on which they can operate. When it comes to considering the terms of an individual, self-contained, engagement, the fact that the parties are not be obliged in future to offer - or to accept - another engagement with the same, or a different, client must be neither here nor there.

(3) Weighing the Conditions in the way that the law requires, there is to be set on the one side (contract for services) the express statement that the worker is to be regarded as self-employed and not to be working under a contract of service; and the liberty reserved to the worker of being able to work on a self-employed basis for a particular client. On the other (contract of service) side are to be set the reservation of a power of dismissal for misconduct; the power of the contractor to bring any assignment to an end; the provision of a review procedure if such termination takes place; the establishment of a grievance procedure; the importation referred to in (1) above; and the stipulation of an hourly pay rate, which is subject to deductions for unsatisfactory time-keeping, work, attitude, or misconduct.

(4) When those indications are set against each other, and the specific engagement is looked at as a whole in all its terms, the general impression which emerges is that the engagement involved in this single assignment gave rise - despite the label put on it by the parties - to a contract of service between the temporary worker and the contractor.

Potter LJ and McCowan LJ agreed.

== See also ==
- Contract of employment in English law
- UK labour law
- UK insolvency law
- EU labour law
- US labor law
- German labour law
