= Western Excavating (ECC) Ltd v Sharp =

- Court: Court of Appeal of England and Wales
- Citation: [1978] ICR 221
- Transcript

Court membership
- Judges sitting: Lord Denning, LORD JUSTICE LAWTON, LORD JUSTICE EVELEIGH

Keywords
- Unfair dismissal

Western Excavating (ECC) Ltd v Sharp [1978] ICR 221 is a UK labour law case, concerning unfair dismissal, now governed by the Employment Rights Act 1996.

== Facts ==
Mr Sharp was suspended without pay for 5 days because of his absences. This put him in financial difficulty, the welfare officer would not help, and so he quit so he could collect holiday pay immediately. He then claimed constructive unfair dismissal.

The Employment Tribunal held that the company ‘ought to have leant over backwards’ to help Mr Sharp. One member, dissenting, argued Mr Sharp should have again visited the welfare officer. The Employment Appeal Tribunal upheld the ruling, but only on the basis that the Tribunal had made findings of fact that were apparently not perverse.

== Judgment ==
The Court of Appeal reversed the Tribunal and held that Mr Sharp had been constructively dismissed. Lord Denning MR noted that there was a dispute about how to assess what was a constructive dismissal, partly as Megaw LJ in Turner v London Transport Executive [1977] ICR 952, 964, said that the test for whether there was a dismissal under what is now the Employment Rights Act 1996 section 95(1)(c) was the same as whether the dismissal was fair. But instead the ordinary ‘contract test’ should apply so that a dismissal must first be established as follows. According to Lord Denning MR,

If the employer is guilty of conduct which is a significant breach going to the root of the contract of employment, or which shows that the employer no longer intends to be bound by one or more of the essential terms of the contract, then the employee is entitled to treat himself as discharged from any further performance. If he does so, then he terminates the contract by reason of the employer’s conduct.

Hence, the Tribunal’s ‘whimsical’ decision was wrong, because they failed to separate the question of fairness from whether there was a dismissal. Mr Sharp left of his own accord.

== See also ==
- UK labour law
