= Homer v Chief Constable of West Yorkshire =

UK labour law case

Homer v CC of West Yorkshire Police
- Court: UK Supreme Court
- Citation: [2012] UKSC 15

Keywords
- Discrimination

Homer v Chief Constable of West Yorkshire Police [2012] UKSC 15 is a UK labour law case, concerning discrimination under what is now the Equality Act 2010.

== Facts ==
Mr Homer claimed indirect age discrimination, because after a rule change he was required to have a law degree to get onto the third and highest pay grade, once he was 62 years old. He began working as a legal adviser in 1995 with the Police National Legal Database. He was required to have a law degree or in his case ‘exceptional experience in criminal law with a lesser qualification’. But to get the highest pay grade after a 2005 review, legal advisers now actually had to have a law degree, and so he was refused entry.

He brought a claim under the Employment Equality (Age) Regulations 2006, SI 2006/1031 after internal grievances and appeals were dismissed. The Employment Tribunal allowed Mr Homer’s claim.

In the Employment Appeal Tribunal, Elias P, [2009] overturning the Tribunal, held that there was no basis for thinking there was any particular disadvantage for those aged between 60 and 65, because it was not intrinsically more difficult for people in that category to get a degree. The financial consequences resulted merely from age, not age discrimination.

The Court of Appeal [2010] agreed with the Employment Appeal Tribunal, arguing that it was not Mr Homer’s age that put him at a particular disadvantage but his impending retirement, the same as any employee nearing retirement in four years.

The Supreme Court allowed his appeal and determined that the case must be remitted back to the Employment Tribunal for further consideration. The Supreme Court determined that the new education requirement discriminated on the basis of age.

== Judgment ==
Lady Hale (with whom Lord Brown and Lord Kerr agreed) held that Mr Homer had suffered indirect age discrimination. Mr Homer’s near retirement was directly related to his age. The question would be remitted to the Tribunal to decide whether there was a justification for indirect discrimination.

17. [...] The law of indirect discrimination is an attempt to level the playing field by subjecting to scrutiny requirements which look neutral on their face but in reality work to the comparative disadvantage of people with a particular protected characteristic. A requirement which works to the comparative disadvantage of a person approaching compulsory retirement age is indirectly discriminatory on grounds of age. There is, as Lord Justice Maurice Kay acknowledged, "unreality in differentiating between age and retirement" [34]. Put simply, the reason for the disadvantage was that people in this age group did not have time to acquire a law degree. And the reason why they did not have time to acquire a law degree was that they were soon to reach the age of retirement. The resulting scrutiny may ultimately lead to the conclusion that the requirement can be justified. But if it cannot, then it can be modified so as to remove the disadvantage.

18. I would therefore allow Mr Homer's appeal on this point.

Justification

19. The approach to the justification of what would otherwise be indirect discrimination is well settled. A provision, criterion or practice is justified if the employer can show that it is a proportionate means of achieving a legitimate aim. The range of aims which can justify indirect discrimination on any ground is wider than the aims which can, in the case of age discrimination, justify direct discrimination. It is not limited to the social policy or other objectives derived from article 6(1), 4(1) and 2(5) of the Directive, but can encompass a real need on the part of the employer's business: Bilka-Kaufhaus GmbH v Weber von Hartz, Case 170/84, [1987] ICR 110.

20. As Mummery LJ explained in R (Elias) v Secretary of State for Defence [2006] EWCA Civ 1293, [2006] 1 WLR 3213, at [151]:

". . . the objective of the measure in question must correspond to a real need and the means used must be appropriate with a view to achieving the objective and be necessary to that end. So it is necessary to weigh the need against the seriousness of the detriment to the disadvantaged group."

21. He went on, at [165], to commend the three-stage test for determining proportionality derived from de Freitas v Permanent Secretary of Ministry of Agriculture, Fisheries, Lands and Housing [1999] 1 AC 69, 80:

"First, is the objective sufficiently important to justify limiting a fundamental right? Secondly, is the measure rationally connected to the objective? Thirdly, are the means chosen no more than is necessary to accomplish the objective?"

As the Court of Appeal held in Hardy & Hansons plc v Lax [2005] EWCA Civ 846, [2005] ICR 1565 [31, 32], it is not enough that a reasonable employer might think the criterion justified. The tribunal itself has to weigh the real needs of the undertaking, against the discriminatory effects of the requirement.

21. The ET found that the aim of requiring a law degree was to facilitate the recruitment and retention of staff of appropriate calibre within the PNLD. It is not disputed that this was a legitimate aim. When it comes to considering proportionality, however, it is necessary to distinguish the aim of recruitment from the aim of retention. It is also necessary to distinguish the aim of retaining newly or recently recruited staff, who can benefit from the opportunity of career progression, and the aim of retaining existing staff, who were recruited under a different system, and who may or may not be motivated to stay by such an incentive. It was clearly important to the developing organisation to retain the skills and expertise of its existing highly valued staff, including Mr Homer. This means, as the EAT pointed out, that it was necessary to distinguish between the justification of the criteria for recruitment and the justification of the criteria for the thresholds above that, and in particular the third threshold.

22. The ET (perhaps in reliance on the IDS handbook on age discrimination) regarded the terms "appropriate", "necessary" and "proportionate" as "equally interchangeable" [29, 31]. It is clear from the European and domestic jurisprudence cited above that this is not correct. Although the regulation refers only to a "proportionate means of achieving a legitimate aim", this has to be read in the light of the Directive which it implements. To be proportionate, a measure has to be both an appropriate means of achieving the legitimate aim and (reasonably) necessary in order to do so. Some measures may simply be inappropriate to the aim in question: thus, for example, the aim of rewarding experience is not achieved by age related pay scales which apply irrespective of experience (Hennigs v Eisenbahn-Bundesamt; Land Berlin v Mai, Joined Cases C-297/10 and C-298/10 [2012] 1 CMLR 18); the aim of making it easier to recruit young people is not achieved by a measure which applies long after the employees have ceased to be young (Kücükdeveci v Swedex GmbH & Co KG, Case C-555/07, [2011] 2 CMLR 33). So it has to be asked whether requiring existing employees to have a law degree before they can achieve the highest grade is appropriate to the aims of recruiting and retaining new staff or retaining existing staff within the organisation. The EAT expressed some scepticism about this [45, 46].

23. A measure may be appropriate to achieving the aim but go further than is (reasonably) necessary in order to do so and thus be disproportionate. The EAT suggested that "what has to be justified is the discriminatory effect of the unacceptable criterion" [44]. Mr Lewis points out that this is incorrect: both the Directive and the Regulations require that the criterion itself be justified rather than that its discriminatory effect be justified (there may well be a difference here between justification under the anti-discrimination law derived from the European Union and the justification of discrimination in the enjoyment of convention rights under the European Convention of Human Rights).

24. Part of the assessment of whether the criterion can be justified entails a comparison of the impact of that criterion upon the affected group as against the importance of the aim to the employer. That comparison was lacking, both in the ET and in the EAT. Mr Homer (and anyone else in his position, had there been someone) was not being sacked or downgraded for not having a law degree. He was merely being denied the additional benefits associated with being at the highest grade. The most important benefit in practice is likely to have been the impact upon his final salary and thus upon the retirement pension to which he became entitled. So it has to be asked whether it was reasonably necessary in order to achieve the legitimate aims of the scheme to deny those benefits to people in his position? The ET did not ask itself that question.

25. To some extent the answer depends upon whether there were non-discriminatory alternatives available. It is not clear whether the ET were suggesting that an exception should have been made for Mr Homer (who was on any view an exceptional case) or whether they were suggesting that the criterion should have been modified to include qualifications other than law degrees. As the EAT said, an ad hominem exception may be the right answer in personnel management terms but it is not the answer to a discrimination claim. Any exception has to be made for everyone who is adversely affected by the rule. "Grandfather clauses" preserving the existing status and seniority, with attendant benefits, of existing employees are not at all uncommon when salary structures are revised. So it is relevant to ask whether such a clause could have represented a more proportionate means of achieving the legitimate aims of the organisation. On the other hand, what is in issue here is not preserving existing benefits but affording entry to a newly created higher grade.

26. As the ET did not approach the question of justification in a suitably structured way, and ask itself all the right questions, the case should be remitted on the issue of justification. We cannot be clear that if they had asked the right questions they would have reached the same conclusion, although it is possible that they would have done so. However, as the EAT pointed out, there is nothing to stop the Chief Constable deciding to make a personal exception for Mr Homer, quite independently of his age discrimination claim (provided of course that it can be done without discriminating against someone else on a prohibited ground). This litigation has been pursued in a friendly spirit and it is to be hoped that it might be resolved in similar vein.

Lord Hope, in a short concurring judgment, expressed the view that discrimination is not justified just because eliminating it would put others at a disadvantage that was not related to their age.

Lord Mance also gave a short concurring judgment, although pointing out that to allow Mr Homer to go to the third pay grade without a law degree could be discriminatory against young people.

== Follow on ==
In Games v University of Kent [2014] UKEAT 0524/13/1407, the tribunal examined Homer and the argument that the candidate was not discriminated against due to an education requirement. The tribunal then expounded on the time at which a test is applied is the time at which the capabilities of the claimant are to be assessed. The argument that the claimant could have gone to school in the past is not a valid defence.

== See also ==
- UK labour law
- European Union law
