= Scots contract law =

Aspect of Scottish law

Requirements of Writing (Scotland) Act 1995

Scots contract law governs the rules of contract in Scotland.

== Formation of a contract ==
A Contract is created by bilateral agreement and should be distinguished from a unilateral promise, the latter being recognised as a distinct and enforceable species of obligation in Scots Law. The English requirement for consideration does not apply in Scotland, so it is possible to have a gratuitous contract, i.e. a contract where only one of the parties comes under any duties to the other (e.g. a contract to perform services for no consideration). If, however, consideration is given, as for example in a sales contract, the contract is said to be onerous.

A contract is an agreement between two or more parties which creates or intends to create legally binding obligations between the parties to it. There must be an agreement on the essentials of the contract; the parties, the subject matter; and the price.

Under the Age of Legal Capacity (Scotland) Act 1991, the general rule is that a person only gains full legal capacity at the age of 16. This is qualified by the provision that those under 16 can "enter into a transaction of a kind commonly entered into by persons of his age and circumstances, and on terms which are not unreasonable".

Note however that not all declarations made by a person to another person will amount to a promise that is enforceable under Scots law. In particular, a declaration of intention, a testamentary provision, and an offer will not be a promise.

A Contract is formed by the acceptance of an offer; an offer can be constituted by responding to an invitation to treat. Variation of the original offer counts as counter-offer, which must then be accepted to form a contract.

The default rule in Scotland is that contracts do not need to be in writing - they can be created orally. The Requirements of Writing (Scotland) Act 1995 provides exceptions for specific types of contract that must be created by writing. This includes:

- The creation, transfer, variation or extinction of a real right in land (s 1(2) (a)(i)); and
- A gratuitous unilateral obligation except an obligation undertaken in the course of business (s 1(2)(a)(ii)) [Note that this section has caused great debate amongst academics as to the meanings of ‘unilateral’ and ‘gratuitous’. Some believe that the inclusion of the two terms in this section points to a desire of the drafters that they be given different meanings. This would allow some promises to be unilateral but not gratuitous. This argument was particularly discussed by both Martin Hogg (University of Edinburgh) and Joe Thomson (University of Glasgow) in articles for the Scots Law Times (News) in 1998 and 1997 respectively.

== Termination of the contract ==
=== Frustration ===
The doctrine of frustration can be applied in order to release parties from their contractual obligations, when unexpected circumstances have impacted the contract. In order for the contract to be frustrated, an external event must have caused:

- Performance of the contract to become impossible due to destruction of the subject matter;
- Performance under the contract to be radically different to what was envisaged by the parties, or;
- The contract to have become illegal after it has been formed. Such as in Cantiere San Rocco SA v Clyde Shipbuilding & Engineering Co, where an Austrian firm entered into a contract a Scottish company, who was to build a set of marine engines. The first instalment was paid when the contract was signed, but before the work began, World War One broke out and it became illegal to trade with an Austrian company as it had become an enemy alien. The contract was therefore frustrated and both parties were relieved of further performance of the contract.

== See also ==
- English contract law
