= Mach Recruitment Ltd v Oliveira =

2025 British employment law case

- Court: Employment Appeal Tribunal
- Citation: [2025] EAT 107

Case opinions
- Bowers J

Keywords
- Transfer of undertakings

Mach Recruitment Ltd v Oliveira is a 2025 Employment Appeal Tribunal case which clarified the application of the Transfer of Undertakings (Protection of Employment) Regulations 2006 (TUPE) to temporary agency workers. The case addressed the meaning of an organised grouping of employees in the context of a service provision change between two temporary work agencies. The tribunal upheld the initial ruling, finding that a TUPE transfer had occurred.

== Background ==
The claimant, Mrs. Oliveira, was an agency worker supplied by G-Staff Ltd to Butcher's Pet Care Ltd, where she consistently worked alongside the same group of colleagues. Oliveira was under an employment contract due to G-Staff's use of the "Swedish derogation" exemption to rules on treating workers as direct employees of the end user.

In July 2018, Mach Recruitment Ltd took over the contract, and Oliveira continued to work at the site in the same role. Oliveira subsequently brought a claim arguing her employment should have automatically transferred from G-Staff to Mach Recruitment.

== Judgment ==
In order to determine whether a TUPE transfer had taken place, the Employment Tribunal examined the core issue of the existence of a deliberately organised grouping of employees formed for the purposes of carrying out work for the client. The tribunal ruled that this was the case and found in favour of Oliveira.

Mach Recruitment appealed to the Employment Appeal Tribunal (EAT), arguing that there was no deliberately organised grouping, but that the employees had been assembled organically. The EAT ruled that a formal decision to structure the group of employees was not a necessary precondition for it to be considered an "organised grouping" and upheld the original ruling.

== See also ==
UK labour law
