= Oakland v Wellswood (Yorkshire) Ltd =

UK labour law case

- Court: Court of Appeal
- Citation: [2009] IRLR 250, [2009] EWCA Civ 1094, [2010] IRLR 82

Keywords
- Transfer of undertakings

Oakland v Wellswood (Yorkshire) Ltd is a UK labour law case concerning transfers of undertakings, and the job security rights of employees.

== Facts ==
Mr Oakland, a general manager, claimed that he was unfairly dismissed from his job as general manager by Wellswood (Yorkshire) Ltd, which had recently bought the assets of the fruit and vegetable business from Wellswood Ltd. This company had gone into insolvency after three years of trading. The insolvency was a pre-packaged administration. Some employees, including Mr Oakland, were told that they would be taken on by the new company. But then Mr Oakland was dismissed. He claimed it was unfair.

The Tribunal held that Mr Oakland had not worked for the new Wellswood for sufficiently long to qualify for unfair dismissal. This depended on TUPER 2006 regulation 8(7).

== Judgment ==
=== Employment Appeal Tribunal ===
Peter Clark J held that regulation 8(7) was triggered and TUPER 2006 regulations 4 and 7 did not apply since the intention of the administration was to return value to the creditors. It had been open to the Tribunal as a matter of fact that the prepack administration had been started with a view to liquidation of assets. He added that this was a finding consistent with the policy of aiming to promote a ‘rescue culture’ to ensure that potential purchasers of a failing business are ‘not putt off by the effects of TUPE protection’.

Mr Oakland argued that ERA 1996 s 218 (which the counsel just managed to find) should apply so the transfer of the business from Wellswood Ltd to Wellswood (Yorkshire) Ltd did not break continuity of employment.

=== Court of Appeal ===
Moses LJ held that clearly there was a transfer and therefore under ERA 1996 s 218(2)(b) there had been no break in continuity of employment. So the EAT was wrong.

Rix LJ and Smith LJ agreed.

== See also ==
- UK labour law
