= Alemo-Herron v Parkwood Leisure Ltd =

- Court: Supreme Court of the United Kingdom
- Decided: 15 June 2011
- Citation: (2013) C-426/11

Case history
- Prior actions: [2011] UKSC 26, [2010] EWCA Civ 24

Keywords
- Collective agreement, transfer of undertakings

Alemo-Herron v Parkwood Leisure Ltd (2013) C-426/11 is an EU law and UK labour law case concerning whether an employer may agree to incorporate a collective agreement into an individual contract, and if that agreement has a provision for automatic updating of some terms, whether that transfers under the Transfer of Undertakings (Protection of Employment) Regulations 2006. The UK Supreme Court referred to the European Court of Justice the question whether national courts could give a more favourable interpretation to legislation than had been given by German courts.

== Facts ==
Mark Alemo-Herron and 23 others were employed in the leisure services department of Lewisham LBC. Their employment contracts gave them the right to pay increases in line with the National Joint Council for Local Government Services’ collective agreement. In 2002 their jobs were transferred to a company called CCL Ltd, and in 2004 they were again transferred to Parkwood Leisure Ltd. Though it did initially uprate pay, while expressly stating that it did so without liability, from 2004 Parkwood did not want to comply with NJC updates negotiated for a period from 2004 to 2007. They refused pay increases. The employees argued that under TUPER 1981 r 5 (now TUPER 2006 r 4) they were obliged to comply, since the collective agreement had been transferred.

The Employment Tribunal rejected the employees’ claims, based on the ECJ decision under the Business Transfers Directive article 3 in Werhof v Freeway Traffic Systems GmbH & Co KG, saying that this case had decided updates in collective agreements could not bind an employer to whom a business was transferred.

== Judgment ==
=== Employment Appeal Tribunal ===
McMullen J held the Tribunal was wrong to not follow domestic cases, such as Whent v T Cartledge Ltd showing that employees had rights beyond those acknowledged in Werhof. He noted that UK law could be and was more generous to employees in the Transfer of Undertakings Protection of Employment Regulations 2006 than the minimum laid out in the EU Business Transfers Directive.

On appeal, Parkwood submitted that Werhof was conclusive. It could not be made liable for employment obligations resulting from post-transfer collective bargaining. The employees argued that the decision in Werhof did not preclude the United Kingdom, when implementing the Directive through the Regulations, from giving employees wider rights and that the correct interpretation of the Regulations did just that.

=== Court of Appeal ===
Rimer LJ held there was nothing in TUPER 2006 regulation 4 to support the contention that the UK meant to give greater rights than those found in BTD 2001 article 3(1). The ECJ’s interpretation of article 3 had shown the minimum was a static, rather than dynamic, interpretation of the burden of transferees. So a transferee would not be bound by any collective agreement, other than the one in force at the time of the transfer. So not a renegotiated deal, post-transfer. The facts of Werhof were identical and had to be applied here. The better inference was that TUPER 2006 regulation 4 was implementing whatever article 3(1) required, and should be construed accordingly. So the EAT’s decision was set aside, Werhof was applied and Whent was not followed.

Ward LJ and Smith LJ concurred.

=== Supreme Court ===
Lord Hope, giving a unanimous judgment for the Supreme Court, referred to the European Court of Justice the question whether national courts could give a more favourable interpretation to legislation than had been given by German courts. They indicated that the UK Supreme Court would give a more favourable interpretation. However it was emphasised that Parkwood Ltd was not represented in the NJC.

9. The view that was taken in those decisions about the effect of conditions of the kind that the appellants rely on in this case was, in my opinion, entirely consistent with the common law principle of freedom of contract. There can be no objection in principle to parties including a term in their contract that the employee's pay is to be determined from time to time by a third party such as the NJC of which the employer is not a member or on which it is not represented. It all depends on what the parties have agreed to, as revealed by the words they have used in their contract. The fact that the employer has no part to play in the negotiations by which the rates of pay are determined makes no difference. Unless the contract itself provides otherwise, the employee is entitled to be paid according to the rates of pay as determined by the third party. This is simply what the parties have agreed to in their contract. The same is true of the transferee in the event of the transfer of an undertaking regulated by TUPE. Domestic law tells us that the term in the contract is enforceable against the transferee in just the same way as it was against the original employer. As Rimer LJ said in the Court of Appeal, decisions such as Whent amount to no more than a conventional application of ordinary principles of contract law to the statutory consequences apparently created by regulation 5 of TUPE: [2010] ICR 793, para 46.

Lord Walker, Lord Brown, Lord Kerr and Lord Dyson concurred.

=== European Court of Justice ===
The European Court of Justice held that the employees could not be regarded as transferring automatically under the terms of the Directive. The reason was that Parkwood Leisure Ltd would not be represented on the National Joint Committee that set the new "dynamic" terms that would form a part of the employees' contracts. Without any scope for representation in this process, there would be an undue limit on the employer's business freedom, and freedom of contract, protected by the Charter of Fundamental Rights of the European Union, article 16.

25. Directive 77/187 does not aim solely to safeguard the interests of employees in the event of transfer of an undertaking, but seeks to ensure a fair balance between the interests of those employees, on the one hand, and those of the transferee, on the other.

[...]

28. ... a dynamic clause referring to collective agreements negotiated and agreed after the date of transfer of the undertaking concerned that are intended to regulate changes in working conditions in the public sector is liable to limit considerably the room for manoeuvre necessary for a private transferee to make such adjustments and changes.

[...]

33. ...the transferee [a contracting party] must be able to assert its interests effectively in a contractual process to which it is party and to negotiate the aspects determining changes in the working conditions of its employees with a view to its future economic activity.

34. However, the transferee in the main proceedings is unable to participate in the collective bargaining body at issue. In those circumstances, the transferee can neither assert its interests effectively in a contractual process nor negotiate the aspects determining changes in working conditions for its employees with a view to its future economic activity.

35. In those circumstances, the transferee’s contractual freedom is seriously reduced to the point that such a limitation is liable to adversely affect the very essence of its freedom to conduct a business.

== Significance ==
The Alemo-Herron decision of the Court of Appeal would imply that a collective agreement would rank with secondary status compared to other "dynamic" contract terms, such as an inflation-linked index of pay increases. While the Court of Appeal suggested that the facts of Werhof were practically identical to the facts of Alemo-Herron, it did not consider that German domestic law, as interpreted by German courts, was different and at a lower standard than English domestic law, as interpreted by English courts, and operating in a different socio-legal environment that has legally binding collective agreements and promotes works councils as a substitute dynamic element in the employment relationship. Accordingly a floor of rights set by the Court of Justice of the European Union would not logically affect the higher protection offered by UK law. In a note on the decision, Charles Wynn-Evans suggests an argument against the decision of the Court of Appeal is that it ‘fails to respect domestic contractual orthodoxy which permits ongoing determination of contractual terms by reference to a third-party body established by collective agreement. The dynamic approach arguably ensures consistency between the protection afforded by the transfer of undertakings legislation to the terms and conditions of employment of the transferring employees and common law orthodoxy which finds nothing controversial in those employees’ terms being determined by a third party.'

== See also ==
- Howard Johnson Co v Detroit Local Joint Executive Board, 417 US 249 (1974)
- Werhof v Freeway Traffic Systems GmbH & Co KG (2006) C-499/04 [2006] ECR I-2397
