= List of statutory rules of Northern Ireland, 2006 =

This is an incomplete list of statutory rules of Northern Ireland in 2006.

== 1-100 ==
- Control of Noise at Work Regulations (Northern Ireland) 2006 (S.R. 2006 No. 1)
- Official Feed and Food Controls Regulations (Northern Ireland) 2006 (S.R. 2006 No. 2)
- Food Hygiene Regulations (Northern Ireland) 2006 (S.R. 2006 No. 3)
- Occupational Pension Schemes (Consultation by Employers) (Modification for Multi-employer Schemes) Regulations (Northern Ireland) 2006 (S.R. 2006 No. 4)
- Weighing Equipment (Non-automatic Weighing Machines) Regulations (Northern Ireland) 2006 (S.R. 2006 No. 5)
- Local Government Pension Scheme (Civil Partnership) (Amendment) Regulations (Northern Ireland) 2006 (S.R. 2006 No. 6)
- Rates (Regional Rates) Order (Northern Ireland) 2006 S.R. 2006 No. 7)
- Rules of the Supreme Court (Northern Ireland) (Amendment) 2006 (S.R. 2006 No. 10)
- Criminal Appeal (Retrial for Serious Offences) (Amendment) Rules (Northern Ireland) 2006 (S.R. 2006 No. 11)
- Criminal Appeal (Prosecution Appeals) (Amendment) Rules (Northern Ireland) 2006 (S.R. 2006 No. 12)
- Disability Discrimination (Code of Practice) (Schools) (Appointed Day) Order (Northern Ireland) 2006 (S.R. 2006 No. 16)
- Disability Discrimination (Code of Practice) (Further and Higher Education) (Appointed Day) Order (Northern Ireland) 2006 (S.R. 2006 No. 17)
- Feeding Stuffs and the Feeding Stuffs (Sampling and Analysis) (Amendment) Regulations (Northern Ireland) 2006 (S.R. 2006 No. 18)
- Police Service of Northern Ireland and Police Service of Northern Ireland Reserve (Full-Time) (Severance) Amendment Regulations 2006 (S.R. 2006 No. 19)
- Personal Pension Schemes (Appropriate Schemes) (Amendment) Regulations (Northern Ireland) 2006 (S.R. 2006 No. 20)
- Insolvency (2005 Order) (Commencement No. 1) Order (Northern Ireland) 2006 (S.R. 2006 No. 21)
- Insolvency (2005 Order) (Transitional Provisions and Savings) Order (Northern Ireland) 2006 (S.R. 2006 No. 22)
- Insolvency (Amendment) Regulations (Northern Ireland) 2006 (S.R. 2006 No. 23)
- Insolvency (Northern Ireland) Order 1989, Article 59A (Appointed Date) Order (Northern Ireland) 2006 (S.R. 2006 No. 24)
- Insolvency (Northern Ireland) Order 1989 (Prescribed Part) Order (Northern Ireland) 2006 (S.R. 2006 No. 25)
- Insolvency (Monetary Limits) (Amendment) Order (Northern Ireland) 2006 (S.R. 2006 No. 26)
- Access to Justice (Northern Ireland) Order 2003 (Commencement No. 5) Order (Northern Ireland) 2006 (S.R. 2006 No. 27)
- Education (Student Loans) (Repayment) (Amendment) Regulations (Northern Ireland) 2006 (S.R. 2006 No. 28)
- Higher Education (2005 Order) (Commencement) Order (Northern Ireland) 2006 (S.R. 2006 No. 30)
- Motor Vehicles (Construction and Use) (Amendment) Regulations (Northern Ireland) 2006 (S.R. 2006 No. 32)
- Insolvency Practitioners Regulations (Northern Ireland) 2006 (S.R. 2006 No. 33)
- Drainage (Environmental Impact Assessment) Regulations (Northern Ireland) 2006 (S.R. 2006 No. 34)
- Measuring Instruments (EEC Requirements) (Verification Fees) Regulations (Northern Ireland) 2006 (S.R. 2006 No. 35)
- Weights and Measures (Passing as Fit for Use for Trade and Adjustment Fees) Regulations (Northern Ireland) 2006 (S.R. 2006 No. 36)
- Pensions (2004 Act and 2005 Order) (PPF Payments and FAS Payments) (Consequential Provisions) Order (Northern Ireland) 2006 (S.R. 2006 No. 37)
- Local Government (General Grant) (Amendment) Regulations (Northern Ireland) 2006 S.R. No. 39)
- Diseases of Animals (Amendment) Regulations (Northern Ireland) 2006 (S.R. 2006 No. 41)
- Foot-and-Mouth Disease Regulations (Northern Ireland) 2006 (S.R. 2006 No. 42)
- Foot-and-Mouth Disease (Control of Vaccination) Regulations (Northern Ireland) 2006 (S.R. 2006 No 43)
- Misuse of Drugs (Amendment) Regulations (Northern Ireland) 2006 (S.R. 2006 No. 44)
- Pensions (2005 Order) (Commencement No. 8 and Appointed Day) Order (Northern Ireland) 2006 (S.R. 2006 No. 45)
- Disability Discrimination (Services and Premises) (Amendment) Regulations (Northern Ireland) 2006 (S.R. 2006 No. 46)
- Insolvency (Amendment) Rules (Northern Ireland) 2006 (S.R. 2006 No. 47)
- Occupational and Personal Pension Schemes (Consultation by Employers) Regulations (Northern Ireland) 2006 (S.R. 2006 No. 48)
- Occupational Pension Schemes (Early Leavers: Cash Transfer Sums and Contribution Refunds) Regulations (Northern Ireland) 2006 (S.R. 2006 No. 49)
- Pension Protection Fund (Pension Compensation Cap) Order (Northern Ireland) 2006 (S.R. 2006 No. 50)
- Education (Prohibition from Teaching or Working with Children) Regulations (Northern Ireland) 2006 (S.R. 2006 No. 51)
- Less Favoured Area Compensatory Allowances Regulations (Northern Ireland) 2006 (S.R. 2006 No. 52)
- Insolvency Practitioners and Insolvency Account (Fees) Order (Northern Ireland) 2006 (S.R. 2006 No. 53)
- Insolvency (Fees) Order (Northern Ireland) 2006 (S.R. 2006 No. 54)
- Insolvency (Deposits) Order (Northern Ireland) 2006 (S.R. 2006 No. 55)
- Renewables Obligation Order (Northern Ireland) 2006 (S.R. 2006 No. 57)
- Infected Waters (Infectious Pancreatic Necrosis) (Revocation) Order (Northern Ireland) 2006 (S.R. 2006 No. 57)
- Registered Rents (Increase) Order (Northern Ireland) 2006 (S.R. 2006 No. 58)
- Dairy Produce Quotas (Amendment) Regulations (Northern Ireland) 2006 (S.R. 2006 No. 60)
- Insolvency (Northern Ireland) Order 2005 (Minor and Consequential Amendments) Order (Northern Ireland) 2006 (S.R. 2006 No. 61)
- Criminal Justice (Evidence) (Northern Ireland) Order 2004 (Categories of Offences) Order 2006 (S.R. 2006 No. 62)
- Criminal Justice (Evidence) (Northern Ireland) Order 2004 (Commencement No. 3) Order 2006 (S.R. 2006 No. 63)
- Tax Credits (Approval of Home Child Care Providers) Scheme (Northern Ireland) 2006 (S.R. 2006 No. 64)
- Occupational Pension Schemes (Republic of Ireland Schemes Exemption (Revocation) and Tax Exempt Schemes (Miscellaneous Amendments)) Regulations (Northern Ireland) 2006 (S.R. 2006 No. 65)
- Plant Health (Wood and Bark) Order (Northern Ireland) 2006 (S.R. 2006 No. 66)
- Road Traffic (Health Services Charges) (Amendment) Regulations (Northern Ireland) 2006 (S.R. 2006 No. 67)
- Police (Recruitment) (Amendment) Regulations (Northern Ireland) 2006 (S.R. 2006 No. 69)
- Social Security (Preparation for Employment Programme 50 to 59 Pilot) Regulations (Northern Ireland) 2006 (S.R. 2006 No. 70)
- Social Security Pensions (Low Earnings Threshold) Order (Northern Ireland) 2006 (S.R. 2006 No. 71)
- Social Security Revaluation of Earnings Factors Order (Northern Ireland) 2006 (S.R. 2006 No. 72)
- Taxis (Enniskillen) Bye-Laws (Northern Ireland) 2006 (S.R. 2006 No. 73)
- Public Service Vehicles (Conditions of Fitness, Equipment and Use) (Amendment) Regulations (Northern Ireland) 2006 (S.R. 2006 No. 74)
- Employment Rights (Increase of Limits) Order (Northern Ireland) 2006 (S.R. 2006 No. 75)
- Credit Unions (Limit on Membership) Order (Northern Ireland) 2006 (S.R. 2006 No. 76)
- Credit Unions (Limit on Shares) Order (Northern Ireland) 2006 (S.R. 2006 No. 77)
- Credit Unions (Deposits and Loans) Order (Northern Ireland) 2006 (S.R. 2006 No. 78)
- Legal Aid (General) (Amendment) Regulations (Northern Ireland) 2006 (S.R. 2006 No. 79)
- Legal Aid (Assessment of Resources) (Amendment) Regulations (Northern Ireland) 2006 (S.R. 2006 No. 80)
- Organic Farming (Conversion of Animal Housing) (Amendment) Scheme (Northern Ireland) 2006 (S.R. 2006 No. 81)
- Plant Health Order (Northern Ireland) 2006 (S.R. 2006 No. 82)
- Motorways Traffic (Amendment) Regulations (Northern Ireland) 2006 (S.R. 2006 No. 83)
- Occupational Pension Schemes (Pension Protection Levies) (Transitional Period and Modification for Multi-employer Schemes) Regulations (Northern Ireland) 2006 (S.R. 2006 No. 84)
- Occupational Pension Schemes (Fraud Compensation Levy) Regulations (Northern Ireland) 2006 (S.R. 2006 No. 85)
- Information and Consultation of Employees (Amendment) Regulations (Northern Ireland) 2006 (S.R. 2006 No. 86)
- Pneumoconiosis, etc., (Workers' Compensation) (Payment of Claims) (Amendment) Regulations (Northern Ireland) 2006 87)
- Local Government (Accounts and Audit) Regulations (Northern Ireland) 2006 (S.R. 2006 No. 89)
- Environmental Impact Assessment (Uncultivated Land and Semi-Natural Areas) Regulations (Northern Ireland) 2006 (S.R. 2006 No. 90)
- Social Security (Claims and Payments) (Amendment) Regulations (Northern Ireland) 2006 (S.R. 2006 No. 91)
- Pension Protection Fund (Risk-based Pension Protection Levy) Regulations (Northern Ireland) 2006 (S.R. 2006 No. 92)
- Companies (Audit, Investigations and Community Enterprise) (2005 Order) (Commencement No. 1 and Transitional Provision) Order (Northern Ireland) 2006 (S.R. 2006 No. 93)
- Companies (1986 Order) (Operating and Financial Review) (Repeal) Regulations (Northern Ireland) 2006 (S.R. 2006 No. 94)
- Pensions (2005 Order) (Commencement No. 9) Order (Northern Ireland) 2006 (S.R. 2006 No. S.R. 2006 No. 95)
- Social Security (Industrial Injuries) (Prescribed Diseases) (Amendment) Regulations (Northern Ireland) 2006 (S.R. 2006 No. 96)
- Social Security (Miscellaneous Amendments) Regulations (Northern Ireland) 2006 (S.R. 2006 No. 97)
- Pollution Prevention and Control (Miscellaneous Amendments) Regulations (Northern Ireland) 2006 (S.R. 2006 No. 98)
- Employment Code of Practice (Access and Unfair Practices during Recognition and Derecognition Ballots) (Appointed Day) Order (Northern Ireland) 2006 (S.R. 2006 No. 100)

== 101-200 ==
- Employment Code of Practice (Industrial Action Ballots and Notice to Employers) (Appointed Day) Order (Northern Ireland) 2006 (S.R. 2006 No. 101)
- Health and Personal Social Services (Assessment of Resources) (Amendment) Regulations (Northern Ireland) 2006 (S.R. 2006 No. 103)
- Social Security (Deferral of Retirement Pensions, Shared Additional Pension and Graduated Retirement Benefit) (Miscellaneous Provisions) Regulations (Northern Ireland) 2006 (S.R. 2006 No. 104)
- Animals and Animal Products (Import and Export) (Amendment) Regulations (Northern Ireland) 2006 (S.R. 2006 No. 105)
- Optical Charges and Payments (Amendment) Regulations (Northern Ireland) 2006 (S.R. 2006 No. 106)
- Potatoes Originating in Egypt (Amendment) Regulations (Northern Ireland) 2006 (S.R. 2006 No. 107)
- Guaranteed Minimum Pensions Increase Order (Northern Ireland) 2006 (S.R. 2006 No. S.R. 2006 No. 108)
- Social Security Benefits Up-rating Order (Northern Ireland) 2006 (S.R. 2006 No. 109)
- Social Security Benefits Up-rating Regulations (Northern Ireland) 2006 (S.R. 2006 No. 110)
- Social Security (Industrial Injuries) (Dependency) (Permitted Earnings Limits) Order (Northern Ireland) 2006 (S.R. 2006 No. 111)
- Local Government Pension Scheme (Amendment No. 2) Regulations (Northern Ireland) 2006 (S.R. 2006 No. 112)
- Social Security (Deferral of Retirement Pensions etc.) Regulations (Northern Ireland) 2006 (S.R. 2006 No. S.R. 2006 No. 113)
- Game Preservation (Special Protection for Irish Hares) Order (Northern Ireland) 2006 (S.R. 2006 No. 114)
- Lord Chancellor (Consequential Provisions) Order (Northern Ireland) 2006 (S.R. 2006 No. 115)
- Fish Labelling (Amendment) Regulations (Northern Ireland) 2006 (S.R. 2006 No. 116)
- Legal Advice and Assistance (Financial Conditions) Regulations (Northern Ireland) 2006 (S.R. 2006 No. 117)
- Legal Advice and Assistance (Amendment) Regulations (Northern Ireland) 2006 (S.R. 2006 No. 118)
- Legal Aid (Financial Conditions) Regulations (Northern Ireland) 2006 (S.R. 2006 No. 119)
- Occupational Pension Schemes (Trustees' Knowledge and Understanding) Regulations (Northern Ireland) 2006 (S.R. 2006 No. 120)
- Police Service of Northern Ireland Pensions (Pension Sharing) Regulations 2006 (S.R. 2006 No. S.R. 2006 No. 122)
- Police Service of Northern Ireland Pensions (Amendment) Regulations 2006 (S.R. 2006 No. 123)
- Justice (Northern Ireland) Act 2002 (Commencement No. 11) Order 2006 (S.R. 2006 No. 124)
- Judicial Pensions (Northern Ireland) (Widows' and Children's Benefits) (Amendment) Regulations 2006 (S.R. 2006 No. 125)
- Judicial Pensions (Additional Voluntary Contributions) (Amendment) Regulations (Northern Ireland) 2006 (S.R. 2006 No. 126)
- Pensions Increase (Review) Order (Northern Ireland) 2006 (S.R. 2006 No. 127)
- Social Security (Young Persons) (Amendment) Regulations (Northern Ireland) 2006 (S.R. 2006 No. 128)
- Workmen's Compensation (Supplementation) (Amendment) Regulations (Northern Ireland) 2006 (S.R. 2006 No. 131)
- Occupational Pension Schemes (Levy Ceiling) Order (Northern Ireland) 2006 (S.R. 2006 No. 132)
- Social Security (Industrial Injuries) (Prescribed Diseases) (Amendment No. 2) Regulations (Northern Ireland) 2006 (S.R. 2006 No. 133)
- Working Time (Amendment) Regulations (Northern Ireland) 2006 (S.R. 2006 No. 135)
- Travelling Expenses and Remission of Charges (Amendment) Regulations (Northern Ireland) 2006 (S.R. 2006 No. 136)
- Companies (1986 Order) (Investment Companies and Accounting and Audit Amendments) Regulations (Northern Ireland) 2006 (S.R. 2006 No. 137)
- Companies (Summary Financial Statement) (Amendment) Regulations (Northern Ireland) 2006 (S.R. 2006 No. 138)
- Companies (Revision of Defective Accounts and Report) (Amendment) Regulations (Northern Ireland) 2006 139)
- Pension Protection Fund (Provision of Information) (Amendment) Regulations (Northern Ireland) 2006 (S.R. 2006 No. 140)
- Occupational and Personal Pension Schemes (Miscellaneous Amendments) Regulations (Northern Ireland) 2006 (S.R. 2006 No. 141)
- Statutory Sick Pay (General) (Amendment) Regulations (Northern Ireland) 2006 (S.R. 2006 No. 142)
- Charges for Drugs and Appliances (Amendment) Regulations (Northern Ireland) 2006 (S.R. 2006 No. 145)
- Rates (Capital Values, etc.) (2006 Order) (Commencement) Order (Northern Ireland) 2006 (S.R. 2006 No. 146)
- Occupational Pension Schemes (Member-nominated Trustees and Directors) Regulations (Northern Ireland) 2006 (S.R. 2006 No. 148)
- Occupational Pension Schemes (Modification of Schemes) Regulations (Northern Ireland) 2006 (S.R. 2006 No. 149)
- Social Security (Incapacity for Work) (Amendment) Regulations (Northern Ireland) 2006 (S.R. 2006 No. 150)
- Local Government (2005 Order) (Commencement No. 2 and Savings) Order (Northern Ireland) 2006 (S.R. 2006 No. 151)
- Police Service of Northern Ireland Pensions (Amendment No. 2) Regulations 2006 (S.R. 2006 No. 152)
- Weighing Equipment (Automatic Catchweighing Instruments) Regulations (Northern Ireland) 2006 (S.R. 2006 No. 154)
- Pension Protection Fund (General and Miscellaneous Amendments) Regulations (Northern Ireland) 2006 (S.R. 2006 No. 155)
- Pension Protection Fund (Reviewable Matters and Review and Reconsideration of Reviewable Matters) (Amendment) Regulations (Northern Ireland) 2006 (S.R. 2006 No. 156)
- Weighing Equipment (Beltweighers) Regulations (Northern Ireland) 2006 (S.R. 2006 No. 157)
- Social Security (Provisions relating to Qualifying Young Persons) (Amendment) Regulations (Northern Ireland) 2006 (S.R. 2006 No. S.R. 2006 No. 158)
- Health and Personal Social Services (Superannuation Scheme and Injury Benefits) (Amendment) Regulations (Northern Ireland) 2006 (S.R. 2006 No. 159)
- Occupational Pension Schemes (Cross-border Activities) (Amendment) Regulations (Northern Ireland) 2006 (S.R. 2006 No. 160)
- Occupational Pension Schemes (Payments to Employer) Regulations (Northern Ireland) 2006 (S.R. 2006 No. 161)
- Occupational Pension Schemes (Levies) (Amendment) Regulations (Northern Ireland) 2006 (S.R. 2006 No. 162)
- Teachers' Superannuation (Miscellaneous Amendments) Regulations (Northern Ireland) 2006 (S.R. 2006 No. 163)
- Zebra, Pelican and Puffin Pedestrian Crossings Regulations (Northern Ireland) 2006 (S.R. 2006 No. 164)
- Plant Health (Amendment) Order (Northern Ireland) 2006 (S.R. 2006 No. 165)
- Social Security (Incapacity Benefit Work-focused Interviews) (Amendment) Regulations (Northern Ireland) 2006 (S.R. 2006 No. 167)
- Social Security (Miscellaneous Amendments No. 2) Regulations (Northern Ireland) 2006 (S.R. 2006 No. 168)
- Social Fund (Application for Review) (Amendment) Regulations (Northern Ireland) 2006 (S.R. 2006 No. 169)
- Judicial Pensions (Spouses' and Children's Benefits) (Amendment) Regulations (Northern Ireland) 2006 (S.R. 2006 No. 170)
- Agriculture (2004 Order) (Commencement and Appointed Day) Order (Northern Ireland) 2006 (S.R. 2006 No. 172)
- Carriage of Dangerous Goods and Use of Transportable Pressure Equipment Regulations (Northern Ireland) 2006 (S.R. 2006 No. 173)
- Service Provision Change (Protection of Employment) Regulations (Northern Ireland) 2006 (S.R. 2006 No. 177)
- Social Security (Persons from Abroad) (Amendment) Regulations (Northern Ireland) 2006 (S.R. 2006 No. 178)
- Welfare Foods (Amendment) Regulations (Northern Ireland) 2006 (S.R. 2006 No. 180)
- Superannuation (Chief Electoral Officer for Northern Ireland) Order (Northern Ireland) 2006 (S.R. 2006 No. 181)
- Carriage of Explosives Regulations (Northern Ireland) 2006 (S.R. 2006 No. 182)
- Domestic Energy Efficiency Grants (Amendment No. 5) Regulations (Northern Ireland) 2006 (S.R. 2006 No. 183)
- Social Security (PPF Payments and FAS Payments) (Consequential Amendments) Regulations (Northern Ireland) 2006 (S.R. 2006 No. 184)
- Seed Potatoes (Crop Fees) Regulations (Northern Ireland) 2006 (S.R. 2006 No. 186)
- Seed Potatoes (Tuber Inspection Fees) Regulations (Northern Ireland) 2006 (S.R. 2006 No. 187)
- Superannuation (Agri-food and Biosciences Institute) Order (Northern Ireland) 2006 (S.R. 2006 No. 188)
- Gangmasters (Appeals) Regulations (Northern Ireland) 2006 (S.R. 2006 No. 189)
- Travelling Expenses and Remission of Charges (Amendment No. 2) Regulations (Northern Ireland) 2006 (S.R. 2006 No. 190)
- Departments (Transfer of Functions) Order (Northern Ireland) 2006 (S.R. 2006 No. 192)
- Legal Advice and Assistance (Amendment No. 2) Regulations (Northern Ireland) 2006 (S.R. 2006 No. 193)
- Common Agricultural Policy Single Payment and Support Schemes (Set-aside) (Amendment) Regulations (Northern Ireland) 2006 (S.R. 2006 No. 200)

== 201-300 ==
- Transmissible Spongiform Encephalopathies Regulations (Northern Ireland) 2006 (S.R. 2006 No. 202)
- Social Security (Electronic Communications) (Miscellaneous Benefits) Order (Northern Ireland) 2006 (S.R. 2006 No. 203)
- Quarries (Explosives) Regulations (Northern Ireland) 2006 (S.R. 2006 No. 204)
- Quarries Regulations (Northern Ireland) 2006 (S.R. 2006 No. 205)
- Labour Relations Agency (Flexible Working) Arbitration Scheme Order (Northern Ireland) 2006 (S.R. 2006 No. 206)
- Pharmaceutical Society of Northern Ireland (General) (Amendment) Regulations (Northern Ireland) 2006 (S.R. 2006 No. 207)
- Countryside Management (Amendment) Regulations (Northern Ireland) 2006 (S.R. 2006 No. 208)
- Environmentally Sensitive Areas Designation (Amendment) Order (Northern Ireland) 2006 (S.R. 2006 No. 209)
- Firemen's Pension Scheme Order (Northern Ireland) 2006 (S.R. 2006 No. 210)
- Common Agricultural Policy Single Payment and Support Schemes (Amendment) Regulations (Northern Ireland) 2006 (S.R. 2006 No. 211)
- Employment of Children (Amendment) Regulations (Northern Ireland) 2006 (S.R. 2006 No. 212)
- Planning (Inquiry Procedure) Rules (Northern Ireland) 2006 (S.R. 2006 No. 213)
- Misuse of Drugs (Amendment) (No. 2) Regulations (Northern Ireland) 2006 (S.R. 2006 No. 214)
- Planning (National Security Directions and Appointed Representatives) Rules (Northern Ireland) 2006 (S.R. 2006 No. 215)
- Ceramic Articles in Contact with Food Regulations (Northern Ireland) 2006 (S.R. 2006 No. 217)
- Planning (Application of Subordinate Legislation to the Crown) Order (Northern Ireland) 2006 (S.R. 2006 No. 218)
- Planning (General Development) (Amendment) Order (Northern Ireland) 2006 (S.R. 2006 No. 219)
- Pesticides (Maximum Residue Levels in Crops, Food and Feeding Stuffs) Regulations (Northern Ireland) 2006 (S.R. 2006 No. 220)
- Planning Reform (2006 Order) (Commencement No. 1) Order (Northern Ireland) 2006 (S.R. 2006 No. 222)
- Occupational Pension Schemes (Contracting-out) (Amendment) Regulations (Northern Ireland) 2006 (S.R. 2006 No. 223)
- Public Angling Estate (Amendment) Byelaws (Northern Ireland) 2006 (S.R. 2006 No. 224)
- Planning Appeals Commission (Decisions on Appeals and Making of Reports) Rules (Northern Ireland) 2006 (S.R. 2006 No. 225)
- Whole of Government Accounts (Designation of Bodies) (Northern Ireland) Order 2006 S.R. 2006 No. 226)
- Pensions (2005 Order) (Codes of Practice) (Early Leavers, Late Payment of Contributions and Trustee Knowledge and Understanding) (Appointed Day) Order (Northern Ireland) 2006 (S.R. 2006 No. 231)
- Agriculture (Weather Aid 2002) (Amendment) Scheme (Northern Ireland) 2006 (S.R. 2006 No. 232)
- Planning Appeals Commission (Decisions on Appeals and Making of Reports) (No. 2) Rules (Northern Ireland) 2006 (S.R. 2006 No. 233)
- Social Security (Income Support and Jobseeker's Allowance) (Amendment) Regulations (Northern Ireland) 2006 (S.R. 2006 No. 234)
- Gangmasters (Appeals) (Amendment) Regulations (Northern Ireland) 2006 (S.R. 2006 No. 235)
- Railways (Safety Management) Regulations (Northern Ireland) 2006 (S.R. 2006 No. 237)
- Planning (Claims for Compensation) Regulations (Northern Ireland) 2006 (S.R. 2006 No. 238)
- Pharmaceutical Society of Northern Ireland (General) (Amendment No. 2) Regulations (Northern Ireland) 2006 (S.R. 2006 No. 240)
- Sales, Markets and Lairs (Amendment) Order (Northern Ireland) 2006 (S.R. 2006 No. 241)
- Industrial and Provident Societies (2006 Order) (Commencement) Order (Northern Ireland) 2006 (S.R. 2006 No. 242)
- Unauthorised Encampments (Retention and Disposal of Vehicles) Regulations (Northern Ireland) 2006 (S.R. 2006 No. 243)
- Unauthorised Encampments (2005 Order) (Commencement) Order (Northern Ireland) 2006 (S.R. 2006 No. 244)
- Legal Aid in Criminal Proceedings (Costs) (Amendment) Rules (Northern Ireland) 2006 (S.R. 2006 No. 245)
- Motor Vehicles (Construction and Use) (Amendment No. 2) Regulations (Northern Ireland) 2006 (S.R. 2006 No. 246)
- Public Service Vehicles (Amendment) Regulations (Northern Ireland) 2006 (S.R. 2006 No. 247)
- Public Service Vehicles (Conditions of Fitness, Equipment and Use) (Amendment No. 2) Regulations (Northern Ireland) 2006 (S.R. 2006 No. 248)
- Public Service Vehicles Accessibility (Amendment) Regulations (Northern Ireland) 2006 (S.R. 2006 No. 249)
- Fire Services (Discipline) (Revocation) Regulations (Northern Ireland) 2006 (S.R. 2006 No. 250)
- Plastic Materials and Articles in Contact with Food Regulations (Northern Ireland) 2006 (S.R. 2006 No. 251)
- Education (Student Support) (2005 Regulations) (Amendment) Regulations (Northern Ireland) 2006 (S.R. 2006 No. 252)
- Pig Carcase (Grading) (Amendment) Regulations (Northern Ireland) 2006 (S.R. 2006 No. 253)
- Management of Health and Safety at Work (Amendment) Regulations (Northern Ireland) 2006 (S.R. 2006 No. 255)
- Contaminants in Food Regulations (Northern Ireland) 2006 (S.R. 2006 No. 256)
- Fire and Rescue Services (2006 Order) (Commencement No. 1) Order (Northern Ireland) 2006 (S.R. 2006 No. 257)
- Community Benefit Societies (Restriction on Use of Assets) Regulations (Northern Ireland) 2006 (S.R. 2006 No. 258)
- Planning (Inquiry Procedure) (Amendment) Rules (Northern Ireland) 2006 (S.R. 2006 No. 259)
- Lands Tribunal (Superannuation) (Amendment) Order (Northern Ireland) 2006 (S.R. 2006 No. 260)
- Employment Equality (Age) Regulations (Northern Ireland) 2006 (S.R. 2006 No. 261)
- Industrial Tribunals (Interest on Awards in Age Discrimination Cases) Regulations (Northern Ireland) 2006 (S.R. 2006 No. 262)
- Animals and Animal Products (Examination for Residues and Maximum Residue Limits) (Amendment) Regulations (Northern Ireland) 2006 (S.R. 2006 No. 263)
- Misuse of Drugs (Amendment) (No. 3) Regulations (Northern Ireland) 2006 (S.R. 2006 No. 264)
- Lands Tribunal (Salaries) Order (Northern Ireland) 2006 (S.R. 2006 No. 265)
- Planning (Issue of Certificate) Rules (Northern Ireland) 2006 (S.R. 2006 No. 266)
- Police Service of Northern Ireland and Police Service of Northern Ireland Reserve (Injury Benefit) Regulations 2006 (S.R. 2006 No. 268)
- Child Support (Miscellaneous Amendments) Regulations (Northern Ireland) 2006 (S.R. 2006 No. 273)
- Passenger and Goods Vehicles (Recording Equipment) (Amendment) Regulations (Northern Ireland) 2006 (S.R. 2006 No. 274)
- Planning (Electronic Communications) Order (Northern Ireland) 2006 (S.R. 2006 No. 276)
- Industrial Training Levy (Construction Industry) Order (Northern Ireland) 2006 (S.R. 2006 No. 277)
- Plant Protection Products (Amendment) Regulations (Northern Ireland) 2006 (S.R. 2006 No. 278)
- Waste Management Regulations (Northern Ireland) 2006 (S.R. 2006 No. 280)
- Drainage Trusts (Dissolution) Order (Northern Ireland) 2006 (S.R. 2006 No. 281)
- Pension Protection Fund (Pension Sharing) Regulations (Northern Ireland) 2006 (S.R. 2006 No. 282)
- Motor Hackney Carriages (Belfast) (Amendment) By-Laws (Northern Ireland) 2006 (S.R. 2006 No. 284)
- Planning (National Security Directions and Appointed Representatives) (Amendment) Rules (Northern Ireland) 2006 (S.R. 2006 No. 285)
- Contracting Out (Functions Relating to Child Support) Order (Northern Ireland) 2006 (S.R. 2006 No. 286)
- Eggs (Marketing Standards) (Amendment) Regulations (Northern Ireland) 2006 (S.R. 2006 No. 287)
- Disability Discrimination (2006 Order) (Commencement No. 1) Order (Northern Ireland) 2006 (S.R. 2006 No. 289)
- Planning (Conservation Areas) (Consultation) Regulations (Northern Ireland) 2006 (S.R. 2006 No. 290)
- Products of Animal Origin (Third Country Imports) Regulations (Northern Ireland) 2006 (S.R. 2006 No. 291)
- Belfast Health and Social Services Trust (Establishment) Order (Northern Ireland) 2006 (S.R. 2006 No. 292)
- South Eastern Health and Social Services Trust (Establishment) Order (Northern Ireland) 2006 (S.R. 2006 No. 293)
- Southern Health and Social Services Trust (Establishment) Order (Northern Ireland) 2006 (S.R. 2006 No. 294)
- Northern Health and Social Services Trust (Establishment) Order (Northern Ireland) 2006 (S.R. 2006 No. 295)
- Western Health and Social Services Trust (Establishment) Order (Northern Ireland) 2006 (S.R. 2006 No. 296)
- Occupational Pension Schemes (Winding up Procedure Requirement) Regulations (Northern Ireland) 2006 (S.R. 2006 No. 297)
- Employer's Liability (Compulsory Insurance) (Amendment) Regulations (Northern Ireland) 2006 (S.R. 2006 No. 298)
- Sea Fishing (Restriction on Days at Sea) (Monitoring, Inspection and Surveillance) Order (Northern Ireland) 2006 300)

== 301-400 ==
- Social Security (Students and Income-related Benefits) (Amendment) Regulations (Northern Ireland) 2006 (S.R. 2006 No. 301)
- Salaries (Comptroller and Auditor General) Order (Northern Ireland) 2006 (S.R. 2006 No. 302)
- Farm Subsidies (Review of Decisions) (Amendment) Regulations (Northern Ireland) 2006 (S.R. 2006 No. 303)
- Family Proceedings (Amendment) Rules (Northern Ireland) 2006 (S.R. 2006 No. 304)
- Rules of the Supreme Court (Northern Ireland) (Amendment No. 2) 2006 (S.R. 2006 No. 305)
- Education (Student Loans) (Amendment) Regulations (Northern Ireland) 2006 (S.R. 2006 No. 307)
- Divorce etc. (Pension Protection Fund) Regulations (Northern Ireland) 2006 (S.R. 2006 No. 310)
- Dissolution etc. (Pension Protection Fund) Regulations (Northern Ireland) 2006 (S.R. 2006 No. 311)
- Education (Student Support) Regulations (Northern Ireland) 2006 (S.R. 2006 No. 312)
- Police Service of Northern Ireland Reserve (Full-time) Severance Regulations 2006 (S.R. 2006 No. 313)
- Health and Personal Social Services (Primary Medical Services) (Miscellaneous Amendments) Regulations (Northern Ireland) 2006 (S.R. 2006 No. 319)
- Social Security (Lebanon) (Amendment) Regulations (Northern Ireland) 2006 (S.R. 2006 No. 320)
- Ozone Depleting Substances (Qualifications) Regulations (Northern Ireland) 2006 (S.R. 2006 No. 321)
- Motor Vehicles (Construction and Use) (Amendment No. 3) Regulations (Northern Ireland) 2006 (S.R. 2006 No. 328)
- Education (Student Loans) (Amendment) (No. 2) Regulations (Northern Ireland) 2006 (S.R. 2006 No. 329)
- Seed Potatoes (Tuber Inspection Fees) (Amendment) Regulations (Northern Ireland) 2006 (S.R. 2006 No. 330)
- Education (Student Loans) (Repayment) (Amendment) (No. 2) Regulations (Northern Ireland) 2006 (S.R. 2006 No. 331)
- Special Educational Needs and Disability (Northern Ireland) Order 2005 (Amendment) (Further and Higher Education) Regulations (Northern Ireland) 2006 (S.R. 2006 No. 332)
- Travelling Expenses and Remission of Charges (Amendment No. 3) Regulations (Northern Ireland) 2006 2006 (S.R. 2006 No. 333)
- Misuse of Drugs (Amendment) (No. 4) Regulations (Northern Ireland) 2006 (S.R. 2006 No. 334)
- Agriculture (Safety of Children and Young Persons) Regulations (Northern Ireland) 2006 (S.R. 2006 No. 335)
- Adoption of Children from Overseas and Intercountry Adoption (Hague Convention) (Amendment) Regulations (Northern Ireland) 2006 (S.R. 2006 No. 336)
- Removal, Storage and Disposal of Vehicles (Prescribed Charges) Regulations (Northern Ireland) 2006 (S.R. 2006 No. 337)
- Penalty Charges (Prescribed Amounts) Regulations (Northern Ireland) 2006 (S.R. 2006 No. 338)
- Immobilisation and Release of Vehicles (Charge) Regulations (Northern Ireland) 2006 (S.R. 2006 No. 339)
- Gangmasters Licensing (Exclusions) Regulations (Northern Ireland) 2006 (S.R. 2006 No. 340)
- Regulation and Improvement Authority (Fees and Frequency of Inspections) (Amendment) Regulations (Northern Ireland) 2006 (S.R. 2006 No. 341)
- Care Tribunal (Amendment) Regulations (Northern Ireland) 2006 (S.R. 2006 No. 342)
- Motor Vehicles (Approval) (Amendment) Regulations (Northern Ireland) 2006 (S.R. 2006 No. 343)
- Work and Families (Northern Ireland) Order 2006 (Commencement No. 1) Order (Northern Ireland) 2006 (S.R. 2006 No. 344)
- Radioactive Contaminated Land Regulations (Northern Ireland) 2006 (S.R. 2006 No. 345)
- Animals and Animal Products (Import and Export) (Amendment No.2) Regulations (Northern Ireland) 2006 (S.R. 2006 No. 346)
- Traffic Management (2005 Order) (Commencement) Order (Northern Ireland) 2006 (S.R. 2006 No. 347)
- Planning (General Development) (Amendment No. 2) Order (Northern Ireland) 2006 (S.R. 2006 No. 348)
- Food (Emergency Control) (Revocation) Regulations (Northern Ireland) 2006 (S.R. 2006 No. 351)
- Pensions (2005 Order) (Commencement No. 10 and Savings) Order (Northern Ireland) 2006 (S.R. 2006 No. 352)
- Insurance Accounts Directive (Miscellaneous Insurance Undertakings) (Amendment) Regulations (Northern Ireland) 2006 (S.R. 2006 No. 353)
- Partnerships and Unlimited Companies (Accounts) (Amendment) Regulations (Northern Ireland) 2006 (S.R. 2006 No. 354)
- Building (Amendment) Regulations (Northern Ireland) 2006 (S.R. 2006 No. 355)
- Producer Responsibility Obligations (Packaging Waste) Regulations (Northern Ireland) 2006 (S.R. 2006 No. 356)
- Employment Protection (Continuity of Employment) (Amendment) Regulations (Northern Ireland) 2006 (S.R. 2006 No. 357)
- Gas Order 1996 (Amendment) Regulations (Northern Ireland) 2006 (S.R. 2006 No. 358)
- Social Security (Miscellaneous Amendments No. 4) Regulations (Northern Ireland) 2006 (S.R. 2006 No. 359)
- Social Security (1998 Order) (Commencement No. 13) Order (Northern Ireland) 2006 (S.R. 2006 No. 360)
- Statutory Maternity Pay, Social Security (Maternity Allowance) and Social Security (Overlapping Benefits) (Amendment) Regulations (Northern Ireland) 2006 (S.R. 2006 No. 361)
- On-Street Parking (Amendment) Order (Northern Ireland) 2006 (S.R. 2006 No. 362)
- Off-Street Parking (Amendment No. 2) Order (Northern Ireland) 2006 (S.R. 2006 No. 363)
- Social Security (Miscellaneous Amendments No. 3) Regulations (Northern Ireland) 2006 (S.R. 2006 No. 365)
- Teachers' Superannuation (Miscellaneous Amendments) (No. 2) Regulations (Northern Ireland) 2006 (S.R. 2006 No. 366)
- Criminal Justice (2005 Order) (Commencement No. 2) Order (Northern Ireland) 2006 (S.R. 2006 No. 368)
- Collective Redundancies (Amendment) Regulations (Northern Ireland) 2006 (S.R. 2006 No. 369)
- Insolvency (Northern Ireland) Order 1989 (Amendment) Regulations (Northern Ireland) 2006 (S.R. 2006 No. 370)
- Consumer Protection (Code of Practice for Traders on Price Indications) Approval Order (Northern Ireland) 2006 (S.R. 2006 No. 371)
- Maternity and Parental Leave etc. (Amendment) Regulations (Northern Ireland) 2006 (S.R. 2006 No. 372)
- Paternity and Adoption Leave (Amendment) Regulations (Northern Ireland) 2006 (S.R. 2006 No. 373)
- Statutory Paternity Pay and Statutory Adoption Pay (Amendment) Regulations (Northern Ireland) 2006 (S.R. 2006 No. 374)
- Penalty Charges (Exemption from Criminal Proceedings) Regulations (Northern Ireland) 2006 (S.R. 2006 No. 376)
- Limited Liability Partnerships (Amendment) Regulations (Northern Ireland) 2006 (S.R. 2006 No. 377)
- Students Awards (Amendment) Regulations (Northern Ireland) 2006 (S.R. 2006 No. 378)
- Social Security (Persons from Abroad) (Amendment No. 2) Regulations (Northern Ireland) 2006 (S.R. 2006 No. 379)
- Planning Reform (2006 Order) (Commencement No.2) Order (Northern Ireland) 2006 (S.R. 2006 No. 380)
- Planning (Development Plans) (Amendment) Regulations (Northern Ireland) 2006 (S.R. 2006 No. 382)
- Education (Student Support) (Amendment) Regulations (Northern Ireland) 2006 (S.R. 2006 No. 383)
- Student Fees (Qualifying Courses and Persons) Regulations (Northern Ireland) 2006 (S.R. 2006 No. 384)
- Environmental Noise Regulations (Northern Ireland) 2006 (S.R. 2006 No. 387)
- Social Security (1998 Order) (Prescribed Benefits) Regulations (Northern Ireland) 2006 (S.R. 2006 No. 388)
- Working Time (Amendment No.2) Regulations (Northern Ireland) 2006 (S.R. 2006 No. 389)
- Superannuation (Chief Electoral Officer for Northern Ireland) (Amendment) Order (Northern Ireland) 2006 (S.R. 2006 No. 393)
- Northern Ireland Social Care Council (Social Care Workers) Regulations (Northern Ireland) 2006 (S.R. 2006 No. 394)
- Employment Equality (Age) (Amendment) Regulations (Northern Ireland) 2006 (S.R. 2006 No. 395)
- Northern Ireland Social Care Council (Description of Social Care Workers) Order (Northern Ireland) 2006 (S.R. 2006 No. 396)
- Allocation of Housing and Homelessness (Eligibility) Regulations (Northern Ireland) 2006 (S.R. 2006 No. 397)
- Social Security (Incapacity Benefit Work-focused Interviews) (Amendment No. 2) Regulations (Northern Ireland) 2006 (S.R. 2006 No. 398)
- Traffic Signs (Amendment) Regulations (Northern Ireland) 2006 (S.R. 2006 No. 399)
- Local Government Pension Scheme (Management and Investment of Funds) (Amendment) Regulations (Northern Ireland) 2006 (S.R. 2006 No. 400)

== 401-500 ==
- Animals and Animal Products (Import and Export) Regulations (Northern Ireland) 2006 (S.R. 2006 No. 401)
- Social Security (1998 Order) (Commencement Nos. 8 and 10) (Amendment) Order (Northern Ireland) 2006 (S.R. 2006 No. 402)
- Education (Supply of Student Support Information to Governing Bodies) Regulations (Northern Ireland) 2006 (S.R. 2006 No. 403)
- Gas (Designation of Pipelines) Order (Northern Ireland) 2006 (S.R. 2006 No. 404)
- Housing Benefit Regulations (Northern Ireland) 2006 (S.R. 2006 No. 405)
- Housing Benefit (Persons who have attained the qualifying age for state pension credit) Regulations (Northern Ireland) 2006 (S.R. 2006 No. 406)
- Housing Benefit (Consequential Provisions) Regulations (Northern Ireland) 2006 (S.R. 2006 No. 407)
- Motor Vehicles (Taxi Drivers' Licences) (Fees) (Amendment) Regulations (Northern Ireland) 2006 (S.R. 2006 No. 408)
- Pension Protection Fund (Levy Ceiling) Regulations (Northern Ireland) 2006 (S.R. 2006 No. 409)
- Health and Personal Social Services (Superannuation Scheme, Injury Benefits and Additional Voluntary Contributions) (Amendment) Regulations (Northern Ireland) 2006 (S.R. 2006 No. 410)
- Street Works (Reinstatement) (Amendment) Regulations (Northern Ireland) 2006 (S.R. 2006 No. 412)
- Magistrates' Courts (Amendment) Rules (Northern Ireland) 2006 (S.R. 2006 No. 413)
- Magistrates' Courts (Anti-social Behaviour Orders) (Amendment) Rules (Northern Ireland) 2006 (S.R. 2006 No. 414)
- Curd Cheese (Restriction on Placing on the Market) Regulations (Northern Ireland) 2006 (S.R. 2006 No. 415)
- Dangerous Wild Animals (2004 Order) (Commencement No. 1) Order (Northern Ireland) 2006 (S.R. 2006 No. 416)
- Dangerous Wild Animals (Fees) Order (Northern Ireland) 2006 (S.R. 2006 No. 417)
- Food Benefit Schemes (2003 Order) (Commencement) Order (Northern Ireland) 2006 (S.R. 2006 No. 418)
- Plastic Materials and Articles in Contact with Food (No 2) Regulations (Northern Ireland) 2006 (S.R. 2006 No. 420)
- Traffic Management (Proceedings before Adjudicators) Regulations (Northern Ireland) 2006 (S.R. 2006 No. 421)
- Further Education (Student Support) (Cross-Border Eligibility) Regulations (Northern Ireland) 2006 (S.R. 2006 No. 422)
- Employment Protection (Code of Practice) (Disclosure of Information) (Appointed Day) Order (Northern Ireland) 2006 (S.R. 2006 No. 423)
- Energy (Amendment) Order (Northern Ireland) 2006 (S.R. 2006 No. 424)
- Manufacture and Storage of Explosives Regulations (Northern Ireland) 2006 (S.R. 2006 No. 425)
- Feeding Stuffs (Amendment) Regulations (Northern Ireland) 2006 (S.R. 2006 No. 427)
- Private Tenancies (2006 Order) (Commencement) Order (Northern Ireland) 2006 (S.R. 2006 No. 428)
- Agricultural Wages (Abolition of Permits to Infirm and Incapacitated Persons) Regulations (Northern Ireland) 2006 (S.R. 2006 No. 429)
- Penalty Charges (Exemption from Criminal Proceedings) (Amendment) Regulations (Northern Ireland) 2006 (S.R. 2006 No. 432)
- Contracting Out (Functions Relating to Child Support) (Amendment) Order (Northern Ireland) 2006 (S.R. 2006 No. 433)
- Plant Health (Amendment No. 2) Order (Northern Ireland) 2006 (S.R. 2006 No. 435)
- Social Security (National Insurance Numbers) (Amendment) Regulations (Northern Ireland) 2006 (S.R. 2006 No. 436)
- Food Benefit Schemes (2003 Order) (Commencement) (Amendment) Order (Northern Ireland) 2006 (S.R. 2006 No. 437)
- Companies (1986 Order) (Small Companies' Accounts and Audit) Regulations (Northern Ireland) 2006 (S.R. 2006 No. 438)
- Equality Act (Sexual Orientation) Regulations (Northern Ireland) 2006 S.R. 2006 No. 439)
- Building (Amendment No. 2) Regulations (Northern Ireland) 2006 (S.R. 2006 No. 440)
- Teachers' (Eligibility) (Amendment) Regulations (Northern Ireland) 2006 (S.R. 2006 No. 441)
- Salaries (Assembly Ombudsman and Commissioner for Complaints) Order (Northern Ireland) 2006 (S.R. 2006 No. 442)
- Rice Products (Restriction on First Placing on the Market) Regulations (Northern Ireland) 2006 (S.R. 2006 No. 443)
- Pensions (2005 Order) (Disclosure of Restricted Information) (Amendment of Specified Persons) Order (Northern Ireland) 2006 (S.R. 2006 No. 444)
- Housing Benefit (Consequential Provisions) (Amendment) Regulations (Northern Ireland) 2006 (S.R. 2006 No. 449)
- Motor Hackney Carriages (Belfast) (Amendment No. 2) By-Laws (Northern Ireland) 2006 (S.R. 2006 No. 450)
- Criminal Justice (2003 Order) (Commencement No. 3) Order (Northern Ireland) 2006 (S.R. 2006 No. 451)
- Housing Renewal Grants (Reduction of Grant) (Amendment) Regulations (Northern Ireland) 2006 (S.R. 2006 No. 452)
- Employment Equality (Age) (Amendment No. 2) Regulations (Northern Ireland) 2006 (S.R. 2006 No. 453)
- Meat (Official Controls Charges) Regulations (Northern Ireland) 2006 (S.R. 2006 No. 454)
- Student Fees (Amounts) (Amendment) Regulations (Northern Ireland) 2006 (S.R. 2006 No. 455)
- Public Interest Disclosure (Prescribed Persons) (Amendment) Order (Northern Ireland) 2006 (S.R. 2006 No. 458)
- Common Agricultural Policy Single Payment and Support Schemes (Cross Compliance) (Amendment) Regulations (Northern Ireland) 2006 (S.R. 2006 No. 459)
- Pensions (2005 Order) (Codes of Practice) (Member-nominated Trustees and Directors and Internal Controls) (Appointed Day) Order (Northern Ireland) 2006 (S.R. 2006 No. 460)
- Insolvency Regulations (Northern Ireland) 1996 (Electronic Communications) Order (Northern Ireland) 2006 (S.R. 2006 No. 461)
- Housing Benefit (Amendment) Regulations (Northern Ireland) 2006 (S.R. 2006 No. 462)
- Housing Benefit (Electronic Communications) Order (Northern Ireland) 2006 (S.R. 2006 No. 463)
- Rates (Amendment) (2006 Order) (Commencement No. 1) Order (Northern Ireland) 2006 (S.R. 2006 No. 464)
- Equality Act (Sexual Orientation) (Amendment) Regulations (Northern Ireland) 2006 (S.R. 2006 No. 466)
- Occupational Pensions (Revaluation) Order (Northern Ireland) 2006 (S.R. 2006 No. 467)
- Rates (Transitional Provisions) Order (Northern Ireland) 2006 (S.R. 2006 No. 468)
- Justice (Northern Ireland) Act 2002 (Addition of Listed Judicial Offices etc.) Order 2006 (S.R. 2006 No. 469)
- Disability Discrimination (2006 Order) (Commencement No. 2) Order (Northern Ireland) 2006 (S.R. 2006 No. 470)
- Feed (Specified Undesirable Substances) Regulations (Northern Ireland) 2006 (S.R. 2006 No. 471)
- Welfare Foods (Amendment No. 2) Regulations (Northern Ireland) 2006 (S.R. 2006 No. 477)
- Healthy Start Scheme and Day Care Food Scheme Regulations (Northern Ireland) 2006 (S.R. 2006 No. 478)
- Immobilisation and Removal of Vehicles (Prescribed Conditions) Regulations (Northern Ireland) 2006 (S.R. 2006 No. 479)
- Children (Prescribed Orders – Isle of Man and Guernsey) Regulations (Northern Ireland) 2006 (S.R. 2006 No. 480)
- Food for Particular Nutritional Uses (Addition of Substances for Specific Nutritional Purposes) (Amendment) Regulations (Northern Ireland) 2006 (S.R. 2006 No. 481)
- Water Abstraction and Impoundment (Licensing) Regulations (Northern Ireland) 2006 (S.R. 2006 No. 482)
- Water Resources (Environmental Impact Assessment) (Amendment) Regulations (Northern Ireland) 2006 (S.R. 2006 No. 483)
- Recovery of Health Services Charges (2006 Order) (Commencement) Order (Northern Ireland) 2006 (S.R. 2006 No. 484)
- Fishery Products (Official Controls Charges) Regulations (Northern Ireland) 2006 (S.R. 2006 No. 485)
- Rules of the Supreme Court (Northern Ireland) (Amendment No. 3) 2006 (S.R. 2006 No. 486)
- Criminal Appeal (Trial without jury where danger of jury tampering and Trial by jury of sample counts only) Rules (Northern Ireland) 2006 (S.R. 2006 No. 487)
- Phosphorus (Use in Agriculture) Regulations (Northern Ireland) 2006 (S.R. 2006 No. 488)
- Nitrates Action Programme Regulations (Northern Ireland) 2006 (S.R. 2006 No. 489)
- Salmonella in Turkey Flocks and Herds of Slaughter Pigs (Survey Powers) Regulations (Northern Ireland) 2006 (S.R. 2006 No. 492)
- Curd Cheese (Restriction on Placing on the Market) (Amendment) Regulations (Northern Ireland) 2006 (S.R. 2006 No. 493)
- Motor Vehicle Testing (Amendment) Regulations (Northern Ireland) 2006 (S.R. 2006 No. 494)
- Goods Vehicles (Testing) (Amendment) Regulations (Northern Ireland) 2006 (S.R. 2006 No. 495)
- Dangerous Wild Animals (2004 Order) (Commencement No. 2) Order (Northern Ireland) 2006 (S.R. 2006 No. 496)
- Dangerous Wild Animals (Fees) (No. 2) Order (Northern Ireland) 2006 (S.R. 2006 No. 497)
- Rates (Making and Levying of Different Rates) Regulations (Northern Ireland) 2006 (S.R. 2006 No. 498)
- Crown Court (Amendment) Rules (Northern Ireland) 2006 (S.R. 2006 No. 499)
- Local Government Companies (Best Value) Order (Northern Ireland) 2006 (S.R. 2006 No. 500)

== 501-600 ==
- Pesticides (Maximum Residue Levels in Crops, Food and Feeding Stuffs) (Amendment) Regulations (Northern Ireland) 2006 (S.R. 2006 No. 501)
- EC Fertilisers Regulations (Northern Ireland) 2006 (S.R. 2006 No. 503)
- Fair Employment (Specification of Public Authorities) (Amendment) Order (Northern Ireland) 2006 (S.R. 2006 No. 504)
- Recovery of Health Services Charges (Amounts) Regulations (Northern Ireland) 2006 (S.R. 2006 No. 507)
- Sheep and Goats (Records, Identification and Movement) (Amendment) Order (Northern Ireland) 2006 (S.R. 2006 No. 508)
- Waste Electrical and Electronic Equipment (Charges) Regulations (Northern Ireland) 2006 509)
- Social Security (Miscellaneous Amendments No. 5) Regulations (Northern Ireland) 2006 (S.R. 2006 No. 510)
- Grammar Schools (Charges) (Amendment) Regulations (Northern Ireland) 2006 (S.R. 2006 No. 511)
- Potatoes Originating in Egypt (Amendment No.2) Regulations (Northern Ireland) 2006 (S.R. 2006 No. 512)
- Eel Fishing (Licence Duties) Regulations (Northern Ireland) 2006 (S.R. 2006 No. 513)
- Insolvent Partnerships (Amendment) Order (Northern Ireland) 2006 (S.R. 2006 No. 515)
- Rates (Automatic Telling Machines) (Designation of Rural Areas) Order (Northern Ireland) 2006 (S.R. 2006 No. 516)
- Fisheries (Amendment) Byelaws (Northern Ireland) 2006 (S.R. 2006 No. 517)
- Environmental Impact Assessment (Forestry) Regulations (Northern Ireland) 2006 (S.R. 2006 No. 518)
- Waste Electrical and Electronic Equipment (Waste Management Licensing) Regulations (Northern Ireland) 2006 (S.R. 2006 No. 519)
- Carriage of Explosives (Amendment) Regulations (Northern Ireland) 2006 (S.R. 2006 No. 520)
- County Court (Amendment) Rules (Northern Ireland) 2006 (S.R. 2006 No. 521)
- Local Government (Accounts and Audit) (Amendment) Regulations (Northern Ireland) 2006 (S.R. 2006 No. 522)
- Social Security (Bulgaria and Romania) (Amendment) Regulations (Northern Ireland) 2006 (S.R. 2006 No. 523)
- Genetically Modified Organisms (Contained Use) (Amendment) Regulations (Northern Ireland) 2006 (S.R. 2006 No. 524)
- Carriage of Dangerous Goods and Use of Transportable Pressure Equipment (Amendment) Regulations (Northern Ireland) 2006 (S.R. 2006 No. 525)
- River Lagan Tidal Navigation and General Bye-laws (Northern Ireland) 2006 (S.R. 2006 No. 526)
- Laganside Corporation Dissolution Order (Northern Ireland) 2006 (S.R. 2006 No. 527)
- Pension Protection Fund (Insolvent Partnerships) (Amendment of Insolvency Events) Order (Northern Ireland) 2006 (S.R. 2006 No. 529)
- Recovery of Health Services Charges (General) Regulations (Northern Ireland) 2006 (S.R. 2006 No. 536)
- Farm Nutrient Management Scheme (Northern Ireland) 2006 (S.R. 2006 No. 537)
- Welfare of Animals (Transport) Regulations (Northern Ireland) 2006 (S.R. 2006 No. 538)
