= RCO Support Services Ltd v Unison =

RCO Support Services v Unison
- Court: Court of Appeal
- Citation: [2002] EWCA Civ 464

Keywords
- Transfer of undertakings

RCO Support Services v Unison [2002] EWCA Civ 464 is a UK labour law case concerning transfers of undertakings, and the job security rights of employees.

== Facts ==
Patient services of the Walton branch of Aintree Hospitals NHS Trust were transferred to two wards in Fazakerley. Cleaners, through ‘Initial Hospital Services’, had refused to take jobs, on worse terms, with RCO doing the same thing. RCO won the contract, partly, by giving an assurance that TUPE would not apply. RCO relied heavily on Süzen, and argued that if neither assets nor workforce were transferred, there could be no TUPE application. Unison argued Süzen favoured its position.

The EAT noted that it was not sorry to conclude that the Tribunal was correct to hold there was a transfer of an entity which retained its identity. Were it otherwise, new contractors could simply avoid TUPE by not hiring any of the old sacked workers.

== Judgment ==
Mummery LJ noted that RCO relied on Paul Davies’ discussion of the ‘checkered history’ of the background to the Süzen decision. He agreed, all the circumstances should be taken into account. He agreed with RCO's submission that subjective motive is not a real issue. But the offer by RCO to the workers to resign from Initial and join them could be considered.

== See also ==
- UK labour law
