= Secretary of State for Trade and Industry v Slater =

- Court: Employment Appeal Tribunal
- Citation: [2007] IRLR 928 (EAT)

Court membership
- Judge sitting: Elias J

Keywords
- Business transfer, TUPE

Secretary of State for Trade and Industry v Slater [2007] IRLR 928 (EAT) is a UK labour law case, concerning the effects of a business transfer on an employee's rights at work. If the company goes into voluntary liquidation, and the business is sold before the final disposal of assets, then TUPER 2006 regulation 8 does not apply.

== Facts ==
An insolvent company was going into voluntary liquidation, with the help of Deloitte accountants, on 25 July 2006. The employees were made redundant on 26 July 2006. On 27 July 2006, the business was sold as a going concern and the employees were engaged again. In August, there was a creditors meeting and Deloitte accountants were appointed as liquidators. The employees wanted arrears of pay.

The Tribunal held that, under TUPER 2006 regulation 7, ‘at the time of the transfer’ the transferor was subject to ‘insolvency proceedings’. So, it held that TUPER 2006 regulation 4 was excluded and the National Insurance fund was liable for debts under ERA 1996 section 182. The Secretary of State appealed arguing that though there were insolvency proceedings, they were not existing ‘at the time of the relevant transfer’.

== Judgment ==
Elias J held the company did not get out of arrears for pay. The liquidation of the transferor happened as a result of the creditors’ voluntary liquidation. According to the definition in ERA 1996 section 183(3)(a) that did not commence until after the transfer. Therefore TUPER 2006 regulation 8 did not apply. IA 1986 section 388(1)(a) makes it plain that one has to be appointed as a liquidator before one is. So at the transfer’s time there was no insolvency proceeding ‘under the supervision of an insolvency practitioner’.

== See also ==
- UK labour law
