= University of Oxford v Humphreys =

1999 British employment law case

- Court: Court of Appeal

Case opinions
- Potter LJ

Keywords
- Transfer of undertakings

University of Oxford v Humphreys is a UK employment law case concerning transfers of undertakings, and the job security rights of employees. It is authority for the proposition that, if an employee objects to a proposed change, he or she can be in a good position to claim constructive dismissal.

== Facts ==
Mr Humphreys worked as an examiner for the Oxford Delegacy, and was to become a new Associated Examining Board employee. That would adversely affect his working conditions. He previously had tenure, and could only be sacked for wilful misconduct. He objected before the transfer (see TUPER 2006 regulation 4(7), but more crucially regulation 4(9) and art 4(2)), and then alleged constructive dismissal. Oxford University responded that they were not Humphreys' employers at the time of the transfer, because his claim of constructive dismissal effectively meant he had already resigned, and was thus no longer an "employee".

== Judgment ==
Potter LJ held that to accept the University's argument would make a nonsense of the Directive. Instead, the judge declared that Mr Humphreys' objection was effective to establish a valid claim of constructive dismissal against the University. The judge observed:

28. In approaching the proper construction of the Regulations, it seems to me essential to bear in mind the purpose and content of the Directive as elucidated in the decisions of the European Court. In that respect it is clear that, as earlier set out (see paragraph 8 above), the purpose of the Directive is the protection of the employee by enabling him, upon transfer, to enjoy the same terms and conditions of employment as formerly. Whilst the machinery for effecting such purpose is to provide in Article 3.1 for a wholesale transfer of the transferor's rights and obligations to the transferee, it is no part of the Directive's intention to require that the employee's rights against the transferor arising from the relationship up to transfer should be extinguished. In this respect it is stated that Member States may provide that, after the date of transfer, the transferor should continue to be liable in respect of its obligations up to that date.

29. Article 4.1 makes clear that transfer of an undertaking should not per se constitute a ground for dismissal; if it were otherwise, the purpose of the Directive would be self-defeating. However, by Article 4.2 it is made clear that, if the contract of employment was terminated because the transfer would involve a detrimental change in the employee's working conditions, the employer should be regarded as 'responsible' for the termination.

[...]

35. [...] if Mr Goudie's primary case were accepted, it would produce a surprising and unwelcome trap for the unwary, whereby an employee who, like the claimant in this case, objects for substantial reasons to the transfer of his employment, formally records such objection in advance, and purports to accept the termination of the employer as a constructive dismissal under paragraph 5, finds that he has thus "elected" a course which provides no remedy and has disenfranchised himself from any right of action in respect of such dismissal. I cannot think that such was the intention of Parliament at the time of its amendment of the Regulations or that, in truth, it contemplated that it was doing other than preserve the common law right of the employee to a remedy in the circumstances set out. Nor do I consider that the ministerial observations to which we have been referred in Hansard lead to any other conclusion. In my view, they beg the question at issue, rather than answering it.

== See also ==
- UK labour law
