= Wilson v St Helens BC =

- Court: House of Lords
- Full case name: Wilson v St Helens BC and British Fuels Ltd v Baxendale
- Citation: [1999] 2 AC 52

Keywords
- Transfer of undertakings

Wilson v St Helens Borough Council [1999] 2 AC 52 is a UK labour law case concerning transfers of undertakings, and the job security rights of employees.

== Facts ==
Mr Wilson was a teacher whose school had been transferred to St Helens BC. He was dismissed for being ‘redundant’. Then he and other teachers were rehired on new contracts with worse terms. They continued working for a few months before claiming that the reduced wages were in breach of r 5 (now TUPER 2006 r 4). Were the dismissals effective? If not, teachers could claim to be employees under the old terms, whereas if so, they could merely claim unfair dismissal. They wanted to claim unauthorised deductions from pay.

== Judgment ==
Lord Slynn held that the dismissals were effective. Employees’ rights are to be safeguarded, and that means the rights which employees have. Those rights are determined by national law, and there is no general rule of specific performance. Therefore, the dismissals were effective.

the overriding emphasis in the European Court’s judgment is that the existing rights of employees are to be safeguarded if there is a transfer… But neither the Regulations nor the Directive nor the jurisprudence of the Court create a Community law right to continue in employment which does not exist under national law.

So because there is no English law concept of a dismissal being a nullity, the dismissed employees merely got a right to compensation.

== See also ==
- UK labour law
