= Spijkers =

Spijkers is a Dutch surname. Notable people with the surname include:

- Ben Spijkers (born 1961), Dutch judoka
- Cas Spijkers (1946–2011), Dutch chef and writer
- Jur Spijkers (born 1997), Dutch judoka

== See also ==
- Spijkers v Gebroeders Benedik Abattoir CV, United Kingdom labour law case
