= Transfer of Undertakings (Protection of Employment) Regulations 2006 =

United Kingdom statutory instrument

Transfer of Undertakings (Protection of Employment) Regulations 2006 (Note: Section 1(1).)
- Statutory Instrument
- Parliament of the United Kingdom
- Citation: SI 2006/246
- Territorial extent: United Kingdom (Note: Section 1(3).)

Dates
- Made: 6 February 2006
- Laid before Parliament: 7 February 2006
- Commencement: 6 April 2006 (Note: Section 1(2).)
Other legislation
Amends	Trade Union Reform and Employment Rights Act 1993; Employment Tribunals Act 1996; Equality Act 2006
Repeals/revokes	Transfer of Undertakings (Protection of Employment) Regulations 1981
Made under	European Communities Act 1972; Employment Relations Act 1999
Transposes	Transfers of Undertakings Directive
Amended by	Collective Redundancies and Transfer of Undertakings (Protection of Employment) (Amendment) Regulations 2014

Status: Amended

Text of statute as originally enacted

Text of the Transfer of Undertakings (Protection of Employment) Regulations 2006 as in force today (including any amendments) within the United Kingdom, from legislation.gov.uk.

The Transfer of Undertakings (Protection of Employment) Regulations 2006 (SI 2006/246) known colloquially as TUPE and pronounced TU-pee, are the United Kingdom's implementation of the European Union Transfer of Undertakings Directive. It is a part of UK labour law, protecting employees whose business is being transferred to another business. The 2006 regulations replaced the previous 1981 regulations (SI 1981/1794), which implemented the original Directive. The law has been amended in 2014 and 2018, and various provisions within the 2006 Regulations have altered.

== Purpose ==
The regulations' main aims are to ensure that, in connection with the transfer, employment is protected (i.e. substantially continued).

- employees are not dismissed
- employees' most important terms and conditions of contracts are not worsened
- affected employees are informed and consulted through representatives prior to the transfer

These obligations of protection are placed on the transferring companies both before, during and after the transfer. The obligations are relieved if there is an "economic, technical or organisational" reason for the cessation of employment (Regulation 7(1)(b)), or alteration to employees' terms and conditions (Regulation 4(4)(b)).

This does not apply to transfers which go merely through the sale of a company's shares (a "share sale"). When that happens, because the employer (i.e. the original company) remains the same legal entity, all contractual obligations stay the same. The directive and regulations apply to other forms of transfer, through the sale of physical assets and leases. The regulations also apply in some cases for work transferred to contractors. This protected contract terms for workers include hours of work, pay, length of service and so on, but pension entitlement is excluded.

In Ireland, TUPE can apply in an outsourcing, insourcing or on changeover of contractors, where the transferring services retain their identity post-transfer. Importantly, however, TUPE will not automatically apply in these circumstances.

== Provisions ==
1. Citation, commencement and extent

2. Interpretation

3. A relevant transfer

- this takes on the Spijkers language of whether an entity retains its identity, r.3(1)(a)
- the definition of economic entity as an 'organised grouping of resources' comes from Suzen too, r.3(2).
- it also now applies explicitly to a 'service provision change', i.e. contracting out services. An example of this case is RCO Support Services, r.3(1)(b)
- the regulations make clear that a service which is merely performing a 'single specified task' does not fall within TUPE, r.3(3)(a)(ii)
- the definition of an undertaking, to which the regulations apply as something engaged in economic activities, whether public or private, comes from an EC competition law case called Höfner and Elser v Macrotron GmbH [1991] ECR I-1979 r.3(4)(a)
- a new exception is that an 'administrative reorganisation of public administrative authorities' will fall outside TUPE's scope is still unknown in its effect, r.3(5)

4. Effect of relevant transfer on contracts of employment

- the core of this law, r.4(1) provides that employment contracts 'shall have effect after the transfer as if originally made between the person so employed and the transferee'. So new business buyers cannot escape the old business' obligations to its workforce
- it also points out that to fall within the protection of TUPE, you had to have had an employment contract "immediately before the transfer", r.4(3). This was the issue in Litster v Forth Dry Dock [1989] ICR 341, where a relaxed and purposive interpretation was given. So, "immediately" can really mean a while, with wiggle room.
- in r.4(4) it says that variations of employment terms 'shall be void' if the main reason is the transfer itself or 'a reason connected with the transfer that is not an economic, technical or organisational reason entailing changes in the workforce.' In r.4(5) it is emphasised that employees and employers can agree to change terms where this is not the case. The normal rule is that even consensual agreements are void.
- where an employee objects to the change in the identity of the employer, then r.4(7) states he will not transfer to the new employer. He is to be treated as if his contract terminated when the transfer takes place, but that he is not dismissed (unless of course the employer actually does dismiss him), r.4(8). This issue came up in Wilson v St Helens Borough Council [1999] 2 AC 52;
- where the contract is varied detrimentally on transfer, employees can treat themselves as dismissed by the employer. In the Humphreys case (University of Oxford v Humphreys (1) and Associated Examining Board (2) [2000] ICR 405, Court of Appeal) it was decided that an employee who resigns on or before a TUPE transfer because of well-founded fears that the new owner intends to impose worse terms and conditions of employment than those provided by the original owner can claim constructive wrongful dismissal against the original owner. Also, the Tapere case ruled on the interpretation of mobility clauses, and where a relevant transfer involves a substantial change in working conditions which is to the employee's material detriment, held that "detriment" should be considered using the subjective approach which applies in discrimination law.

5. Effect of relevant transfer on collective agreements

6. Effect of relevant transfer on trade union recognition

7. Dismissal of employee because of relevant transfer

- states that employees will be considered dismissed unfairly, if they are dismissed without the employer showing an economic, technical or organisational reason for dismissal. What is certainly not included in this concept is dismissals simply to improve the price of the company before its sale.
- where there is an economic, technical or organisational reason for dismissals, these are considered 'substantial reasons' (i.e. justified reasons) under the fair dismissal provisions of the Employment Rights Act 1996 (s.98(2)(c)). The result for the employee is that he is considered redundant, and thereby should receive a compensation payment if they have been an employee for more than two years under s.135 ERA 1996.
- importantly, an employee dismissed by the seller of the business is deemed to have been dismissed by the purchaser too. This means an unfair dismissal claim can be brought against either party.

8. Insolvency

9. Variations of contract where transferors are subject to relevant insolvency proceedings

10. Pensions

11. Notification of Employee Liability Information

12. Remedy for failure to notify employee liability information

13. Duty to inform and consult representatives

14. Election of employee representatives

15. Failure to inform or consult

16. Failure to inform or consult, supplemental

17. Employers' Liability Compulsory Insurance

18. Restriction on contracting out

== Example ==
Imagine a company that has in-house cleaners. The company decides that they want to tender-out the contract for cleaning services. The new company that takes over the work may employ the same cleaners. If it does so, TUPE will make it likely that the new employer will have to employ the cleaners subject to the same terms and conditions as they had under the original employer, although future recruits may be appointed on different terms and conditions.

If any staff are dismissed by either employer for a reason connected with the new arrangement this will automatically be deemed an unfair dismissal and the new employer will be liable for any statutory claims arising as a result.

This is also the case where a target business (as distinct from shares in a company) is bought from company A by company B (often much larger) and integrated with the business of company B.

== Evaluation ==
The benefits to individual workers are clear; TUPE prevents the possibility of everybody in the firm losing their jobs, just because the company providing the service changes. This gives employees increased certainty. A side-effect of the new regulations could prove unfortunate for some employers. This has been particularly highlighted in connection with law firms.

According to the Law Society's magazine, The Law Society Gazette, law firms might be forced to employ teams of lawyers when taking over contracts.

Under the new rules, if a client decides to source their legal work from a different provider, the legal team from the old provider would be entitled to transfer to the new provider under the same terms and conditions as before; if the new provider were to object, the new employees would be entitled to sue for unfair dismissal.

Dr John McMullen, an expert on TUPE, is quoted as saying: "If you had an organised grouping of solicitors at a law firm devoted to one client, and that client said 'I do not want this law firm, I will appoint law firm X', then TUPE 2006 could apply so that—contrary to what the client is expecting or wanting—it may find that the lawyers would have the right to turn up at the newly appointed law firm. The definition of 'organised group' can be just one person."

Objections to the new regulations had been raised during consultation. An exemption for professional services firms had apparently been mooted by the government but was eventually ruled out. In 2012, the UK coalition government sought feedback on the efficacy of TUPE in relation to professional services and found that there were "mixed views" about whether professional services should continue to be covered by the service provision change regime. In certain sectors, particularly advertising, there was strong support for the idea of introducing an exemption. However, lawyers have highlighted problems with the operation of the New Zealand equivalent of TUPE and warned the government to be cautious in trying to exclude certain groups of employees.

There are potential problems for employees as well. An employee might not want to transfer to the new employer. But, in those circumstances their only option is to "object" which in essence is a resignation but does not impose a duty on the employer to pay notice pay. As their role continues (with the new employer) they are not redundant and therefore have no entitlement to redundancy pay and cannot (except in limited circumstances) claim unfair dismissal.

== Anomalies ==
When the new company takes over the work of its predecessor, it must take on the staff (from the old company) on their existing terms and conditions. This can create the situation where a "transferring" employee may be employed on enhanced terms compared with an employee already employed by the new company. Harmonisation of the terms and conditions between the two groups of employees is generally not possible as the "reason" for it would be the TUPE transfer which (except in limited circumstances) is specifically prohibited.

This could result in a situation where a transferring employee (whose old contract gave them an enhanced holiday entitlement) may be working alongside an existing employee of the new company (working under a contract of employment whose terms were set by the "new" company) who has less generous holiday rights.

== TUPE Plus ==
An extended model of TUPE which aims to address "widely recognised" limitations to the TUPE framework, known as "TUPE Plus" or "TUPE+", has been recommended by Trade Unions and employment advisors. TUPE Plus encompasses a number of enhancements to TUPE which could be included in service contracts, including a guarantee that TUPE would last for the whole length of a contract, because the regulations themselves do not specify a time period.

== Reform ==
Collective Redundancies and Transfer of Undertakings (Protection of Employment) (Amendment) Regulations 2014
- Statutory Instrument
- Parliament of the United Kingdom
- Citation: SI 2014/16
- Territorial extent: England and Wales; Scotland

Dates
- Made: 8 January 2014
- Laid before Parliament: 10 January 2014
- Commencement: 31 January 2014
Other legislation
Amends	Trade Union and Labour Relations (Consolidation) Act 1992; Transfer of Undertakings (Protection of Employment) Regulations 2006
Made under	European Communities Act 1972; Employment Relations Act 1999
Transposes	Directive 1998/59/EC; Directive 2001/23/EC

Status: Current legislation

Text of statute as originally enacted

In April 2011, the UK government proposed a number of reforms to TUPE. These were enacted in the Collective Redundancies and Transfer of Undertakings (Protection of Employment) (Amendment) Regulations 2014 (SI 2014/16), also known as CRATUPEAR, which came into force on 31 January 2014.

== Cases ==
- Taylor v Connex South Eastern Ltd (5.7.2000) Employment Appeal Tribunal (EAT), EAT/1243/99
- RCO Support Services v Unison [2002], EWCA Civ 464
- Spijkers v Gebroeders Benedik Abattoir CV (1986) C-24/85, [1986] 2 CMLR 296
- Süzen v Zehnacker Gebäudereinigung GmbH Krankenhausservice (1997) C-13/95 [1997] 1 CMLR 768; [1997] ICR 662
- Oy Liikenne Ab v Pekka Liskojärvi and Pentti Juntunen (2001) C-172/99, [2001] IRLR 171
- Tapere v South London & Maudsley NHS Trust
- University of Oxford v Humphreys [2000] ICR 405, [2000] IRLR 183
- Werhof v Freeway Traffic Systems GmbH & Co KG (2006) C-499/04
- Nottinghamshire Healthcare NHS Trust v Hamshaw (19 July 2011) Bean J, tribunal was right to find there was no transfer under TUPER 2006 r 3 where the learning-disabled residents of an NHS care home were rehoused in individual homes following the closure of the home and the care workers formally employed by the NHS trust were employed by different care providers to provide support to the residents.
- Edinburgh Home-Link Partnership and others v City of Edinburgh Council and others (2011), EAT case. Lady Smith ruled on the separation of the question about whether there was an "organised grouping" of workers and the question of whether particular claimants belonged to that grouping.
- Optimum Group Services plc v Muir (2012), UKEAT/0036/12/BI, at the Employment Appeal Tribunal in Edinburgh. The EAT overruled the Employment Tribunal's decision, requiring that compensation paid out-of-court by another putative employer should be deducted from the amount ordered by the tribunal to be paid by Optimum for unfair dismissal, as otherwise the claimant benefitted from double recovery.
- London Borough of Hillingdon v Gormanley and Others (2014): the Employment Appeal Tribunal overruled the finding of the Employment Tribunal that three members of one family working for a painting and decorating company, Anne, Robert and Graham Gormanley, were an organised grouping whose principal purpose was the provision of services for the London Borough of Hillingdon.
- ABC v Huntercombe (No. 12) Ltd and others (2025) High Court of Justice

== See also ==
- Cabinet Office Statement of Practice
- UK labour law
- Mergers and acquisitions in United Kingdom law
- Temporary and Agency Worker (Equal Treatment) Bill
- Taylor v Connex South Eastern Ltd (5 July 2000) Appeal No: EAT/1243/99,

Law outside the UK

- Worker Adjustment and Retraining Notification Act

== Bibliography ==
- E McGaughey, A Casebook on Labour Law (Hart 2019) ch 19(1)(c)
- S Deakin and G Morris, Labour Law (Hart 2012) ch 5
