= Litster v Forth Dry Dock and Engineering Co Ltd =

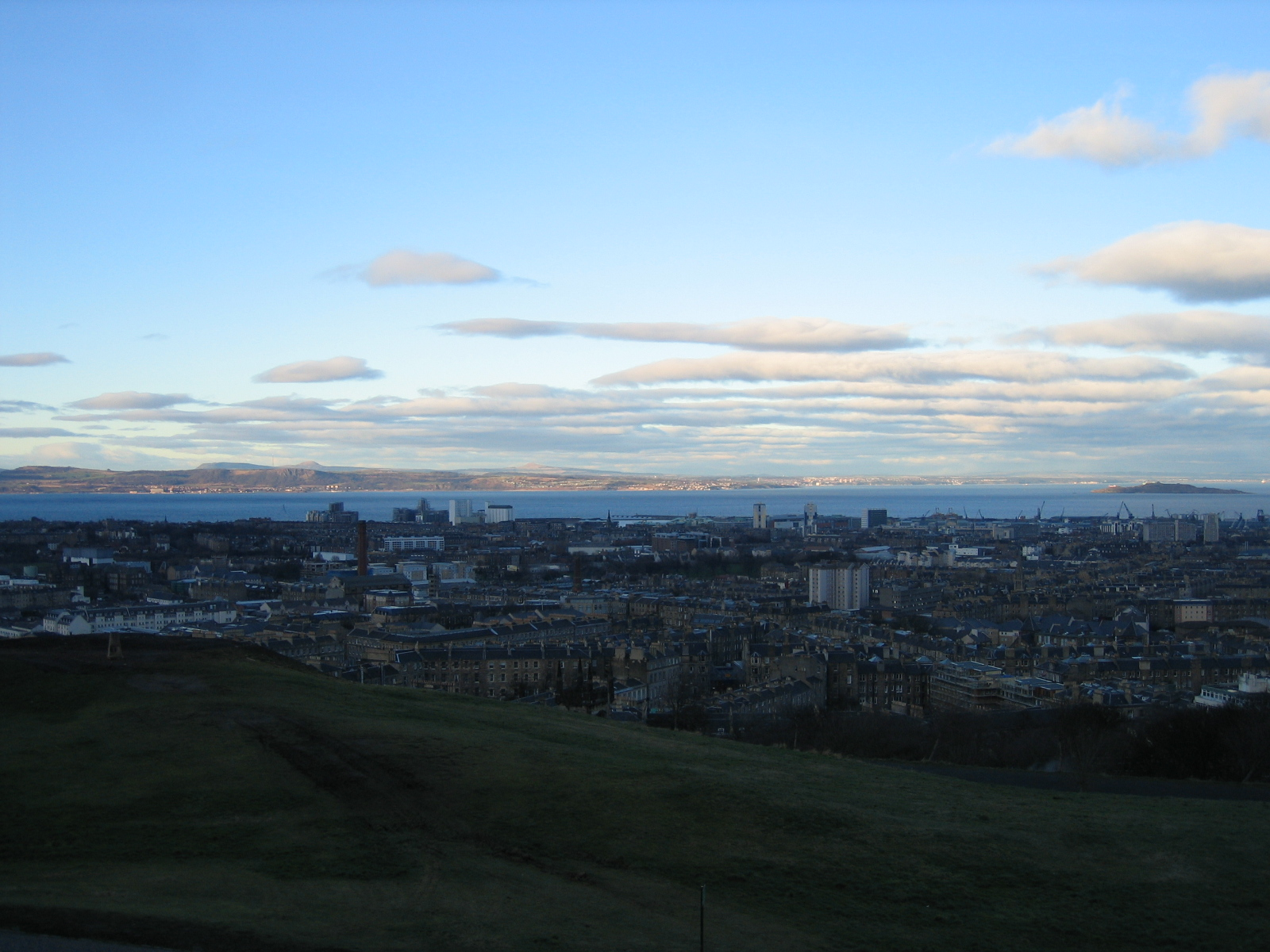
- Court: House of Lords
- Decided: 16 March 1989
- Citations: [1988] UKHL 10, [1989] IRLR 161, [1989] ICR 341

Case opinions
- Lord Templeman, Lord Oliver

Keywords
- Collective dismissal, transfer of undertakings

Litster v Forth Dry Dock and Engineering Co Ltd [1988] UKHL 10 is a UK labour law case concerning the Business Transfers Directive 2001 relevant for the implementing TUPER 2006, though decided under the older 1981 version.

== Facts ==
An hour before the sale by the receiver of Forth Dry Dock to the Forth Estuary company, the receiver sacked all of its twelve employees. The new Forth Estuary company had another set of employees already lined up on lower pay. The receivers had no money left to pay damages for dismissal and holiday pay. TUPER 1981 regulation 5(3) said the Regulations apply to employees who are such ‘immediately before’ the transfer (now, TUPER 2006 regulation 4(3)).

The Court of Session held that, following Spence, none of the employees were employed ‘immediately before’ the transfer. The employees appealed.

== Judgment ==
Lord Templeman held that a purposive approach should be taken, under article 4 of the Business Transfers Directive 77/187/EC. The ‘courts of the United Kingdom are under a duty to follow the practice of the European Court of Justice by giving a purposive construction to Directives and to Regulations issued for the purpose of complying with Directive…’

Lord Oliver agreed that the ECJ cases required a purposive interpretation to be given to the regulations. He noted the remedies provided ‘in the case of an insolvent transferor are largely illusory unless they can be exerted against the transferee’. The dismissals are ‘required to be treated as ineffective’, employment is ‘statutorily continued’ The Directive applied both to an employee at the transfer moment and one who ‘would have been so employed if he had not been unfairly dismissed in the circumstances described in regulation 8(1)’ (now regulation 7(1)).
