= Howard Johnson Co. v. Detroit Local Joint Executive Board =

- Supreme Court of the United States

Argued March 19–20, 1974 Decided June 3, 1974
- Full case name: Howard Johnson Co., Inc. v. Detroit Local Joint Executive Board, Hotel & Restaurant Employees & Bartenders International Union, AFL-CIO
- Citations: 417 U.S. 249 (more) 94 S. Ct. 2236; 41 L. Ed. 2d 46

Case history
- Prior: 482 F.2d 489 (6th Cir. 1973); cert. granted, 414 U.S. 1091 (1973).

Court membership
- Chief Justice Warren E. Burger Associate Justices William O. Douglas · William J. Brennan Jr. Potter Stewart · Byron White; Thurgood Marshall · Harry Blackmun; Lewis F. Powell Jr. · William Rehnquist

Case opinions
- Majority: Marshall, joined by Burger, Brennan, Stewart, White, Blackmun, Powell, Rehnquist
- Dissent: Douglas

Howard Johnson Co. v. Detroit Local Joint Executive Board, 417 U.S. 249 (1974), is a US labor law case that decided that under the Labor Management Relations Act § 301 there can be no obligation on an employer to collectively bargain with employees of a business that has been transferred to him.

== Facts ==
The Howard Johnson Company bought the assets of a restaurant and motor lodge from the Grissoms family that had been running the lodge on its behalf as a franchise. The Grissoms retained the real property and leased it to Howard, and Howard expressly did not assume any of the Grissoms' obligations, including those under a collective agreement. Howard hired 45 of its own staff, but only 9 of the Grissoms' 53 employees and none of the supervisors. The union, the Detroit Local Joint Executive Board of the Hotel Employees and Restaurant Employees Union, said this was a 'lockout' in violation of the Labor Management Relations Act §301, by not hiring all Grissoms' employees back. It sought an injunction for Howard to arbitrate.

The District Court held that Howard was required to arbitrate, but not that all the employees had to be hired back. The Court of Appeal affirmed.

== Judgment ==
Marshall J held Howard was not required to arbitrate because there was no substantial continuity of identity in the workforce, and there was no assumption of the agreement to arbitrate, John Wiley & Sons v. Livingston, 376 U.S. 543, distinguished. Howard had the right not to hire any employees, if it wanted, National Labor Relations Board v. Burns Security Services, 406 U. S. 272, and this right cannot be circumvented by the union asserting its claims in a § 301 suit to compel arbitration, rather than in an unfair labor practice context.

Justice Douglas authored a dissenting opinion and said the following:

The Union brought this action under § 301 of the Labor Management Relations Act, and the District Court issued an order compelling petitioner to arbitrate. The Court of Appeals affirmed, but today this Court reverses, holding that Howard Johnson was not a successor employer. I believe that the principles of successorship laid down in John Wiley & Sons v. Livingston, 376 U. S. 543, and NLRB v. Burns International Security Services, 406 U. S. 272, require affirmance, and thus I dissent.

Wiley was also a § 301 suit, to compel arbitration. There, the company had merged with Interscience, another and smaller publisher, 40 of whose employees were represented by the union. The union contended that the merger did not affect its right to represent these employees in negotiations with Wiley, and that Wiley was bound to recognize certain rights of these employees which had been guaranteed in the collective bargaining agreement signed by Interscience. Wiley contended that the merger terminated the collective bargaining agreement for all purposes, and refused to bargain with the union. We held that the union could compel arbitration of this dispute under the arbitration provision of the collective bargaining agreement even though Wiley had never signed the agreement. We pointed out that the duty to arbitrate will not in every case survive a change of ownership, as when

the lack of any substantial continuity of identity in the business enterprise before and after a change would make a duty to arbitrate something imposed from without, not reasonably to be found in the particular bargaining agreement and the acts of the parties involved.

Wiley, supra, at 376 U. S. 551. But that was not the case in Wiley:

[T]he impressive policy considerations favoring arbitration are not wholly overborne by the fact that Wiley did not sign the contract being construed. This case cannot readily be assimilated to the category of those in which there is no contract whatever, or none which is reasonably related to the party sought to be obligated.

It must follow a fortiori that it is also not the case here. The contract between the Grissoms and the Union explicitly provided that successors of the Grissoms would be bound, and certainly there can be no question that there was a substantial continuity -- indeed identity -- of the business operation under Howard Johnson, the successor employer. Under its franchise agreement, Howard Johnson had substantial control over the Grissoms' operation of the business; it was no stranger to the enterprise it took over. The business continued without interruption at the same location, offering the same products and services to the same public, under the same name and in the same manner, with almost the same number of employees. The only change was Howard Johnson's replacement of the Union members with new personnel, but, as the court below pointed out, petitioner's reliance upon that fact is sheer "bootstrap":

[Howard Johnson] argues that it need not arbitrate the refusal to hire Grissoms' employees, because it is not a successor. It is not a successor, because it did not hire a majority of Grissoms' employees.

As we said in Wiley,

[i]t would derogate from 'the federal policy of settling labor disputes by arbitration' ... if a change in the corporate structure or ownership of a business enterprise had the automatic consequence of removing a duty to arbitrate previously established. ...

376 U.S. at 376 U. S. 549. NLRB v. Burns International Security Services, supra, does not require any different result. There, the original employer, Wackenhut, had a contract with Lockheed to provide security services, and at the expiration of that contract, Lockheed took bid on providing the service, and hired Burns to replace Wackenhut. Wackenhut employees had been represented by the union, but Burns, which hired 27 of the 42 Wackenhut guards, refused to bargain with the union or honor the collective bargaining agreement signed by Wackenhut. We affirmed the NLRB's order requiring Burns to bargain with the union, but concluded that Burns was not bound by the substantive provisions of the collective bargaining agreement between the union and Wackenhut. In distinguishing Wiley, we pointed out in Burns that, unlike Wiley, it did not involve a § 301 suit to compel arbitration, and thus was without the support of the national policy favoring arbitration. Burns, supra, at 406 U. S. 286. Moreover, in Burns,

there was no merger or sale of assets, and there were no dealings whatsoever between Wackenhut and Burns. On the contrary, they were competitors for the same work, each bidding for the service contract at Lockheed. Burns purchased nothing from Wackenhut, and became liable for none of its financial obligations.

All of the factors distinguishing Burns and Wiley call here for affirmance of the order to arbitrate. This is a § 301 suit, and Howard Johnson did purchase the assets from the Grissoms. As a matter of federal labor law, when Howard Johnson took over the operation that had been conducted by its franchisee, it seems clear that it also took over the duty to arbitrate under the collective bargaining agreements which expressly bound the Grissoms' successors. Any other result makes nonsense of the principles laid down in Wiley. The majority, by making the number of prior employees retained by the successor the sole determinative factor, accepts petitioner's bootstrap argument. The effect is to allow any new employer to determine for himself whether he will be bound by the simple expedient of arranging for the termination of all of the prior employer's personnel. I cannot accept such a rule, especially when, as here, all of the other factors point so compellingly to the conclusion that petitioner is a successor employer who should be bound by the arbitration agreement.

== See also ==
- US labor law
- UK labour law
- European labour law
- Parkwood-Leisure Ltd v Alemo-Herron [2010] EWCA Civ 24
- Werhof v Freeway Traffic Systems GmbH & Co KG (2006) C-499/04 [2006] ECR I-2397
