= ABC v Huntercombe (No. 12) Ltd and others =

2025 UK high court ruling establishing the limits of vicarious tort liability transfer

ABC v Huntercombe (No. 12) Ltd and others is a 2025 High Court of Justice case which clarified the extent of liability transfer under the Transfer of Undertakings (Protection of Employment) Regulations 2006 (TUPE). The court ruled that under TUPE, vicarious liability for torts against a third party did not transfer.

== Background ==
The claimant, a patient referenced anonymously as ABC, brought a claim for personal injury against Huntercombe (No. 12) Ltd, the owner and operator of a hospital where she was an inpatient. The patient alleged injury as a result of negligent acts by two of Huntercombe's employees.

Subsequently, Huntercombe sold the business to Active Young People Ltd (AYP). The employment of the two individuals accused of the wrongdoing, along with other staff, was transferred from Huntercombe to AYP under the TUPE regulations.

The claimant sought to hold AYP vicariously liable for the actions of the employees that occurred prior to the transfer. The High Court was asked to determine as a preliminary issue whether this vicarious liability had transferred from Huntercombe to AYP.

== Judgment ==
The High Court held that the vicarious liability did not transfer to the new employer. The court's reasoning focused on the purpose of the TUPE regulations in safeguarding the rights of employees when their employer changes.

The court found that the liability in question was owed by Huntercombe to a third party (ABC), not to the transferring employees themselves. The connection between the liability and the employees' contracts was considered too remote to be transferred under TUPE.

The court noted that if it had determined vicarious liability did transfer, it would have ruled Huntercombe's right to claim on its public liability insurance was also transferred.

The court also concluded that the previous County Court decision in Doane v Wimbledon FC erred in suggesting that vicarious liability for a negligent act did transfer, as it had applied the wrong legal test.

The decision provides clarification on the scope of liabilities that transfer under TUPE. It establishes a clear precedent that transferees will not inherit responsibility for a transferor's vicarious liability for torts committed by employees against third parties before the transfer date.

== See also ==
- UK labour law
