= Taylor v Connex South Eastern Ltd =

Employment Appeal Tribunal case concerning TUPE

Taylor v Connex South Eastern Ltd (5.7.2000) Appeal No: EAT/1243/99, is a UK labour law case, concerning the TUPE Regulations.

== Facts ==
Mr Taylor was a chartered accountant, employed as an administrator by the SouthEastern Train Company, a division of British Rail. It was privatised and sold to Connex South Eastern in 1996. In 1997 he got a new job as Deputy Company Secretary, but on his new contract he made amendments, amounting to a counter offer in contract, therefore, according to the EAT, remaining employed under the terms of his old agreement. In 1998 he was given, according to ongoing changes throughout the company, another new contract, which contained clauses that were to his detriment (he lost some holiday and redundancy entitlement). He complained, but the company would not budge. They insisted he accept the terms or have three weeks notice.

The tribunal found that he was redundant, but that he was dismissed not for this but for 'some other substantial reason' under s 98 of the Employment Rights Act 1996. He therefore lost his claim for unfair dismissal. He appealed.

== Judgment ==
The Employment Appeal Tribunal (Judge Wilkie QC, Ms J Drake and Mr K M Young CBE) held that under r 8(1) (now r 7) of the Transfer of Undertakings (Protection of Employment) Regulations Mr Taylor was actually dismissed in connection with the transfer of the railway from public to private hands. This was so despite the fact that privatisation took place 2 years beforehand.

"27 Two years may appear to be a long time but that begs the question [sic] what has happened in the two years which may have broken the chain of causation. The Employment Tribunal then goes on to say that determination of this point must be a question of fact which, of course, is correct. In the next sentence they assert that in their view there had long ceased to be any possibility of the Applicant being dismissed by a reason of the transfer. That seems to be an introduction to what follows. They then record that the Applicant had been employed for two years on the same terms and conditions as those upon which he had been transferred, and that the Respondent was endeavouring to rationalise its contractual arrangements. They then say, and in our judgment this is a matter of some considerable importance:

"That would have been a matter connected with the transfer if it was still a live issue for those transferred. The matter had however, been resolved for the vast majority of the employees transferred and in our view this issue has become an individual matter between the Applicant and the Respondent and had ceased to be connected with the transfer from British Rail."

28 We are puzzled by this way of putting it. On its face it acknowledges that a proposed rationalisation by the Respondent of the terms and conditions of all its employees, which involved the change in the terms upon which an individual or a group of employees was transferred across, and a dismissal pursuant to a refusal to accept that change, would be a matter connected with the transfer. It seems to presuppose that an individual refusal in the face of everyone else agreeing operates as a cessation of the relevance of regulation 8 (1). In our judgment that is simply an error of law. The rights given by regulation 8 (1) are rights given to individuals, capable of being asserted by one individual or more.

29 It is true to say that in regulation 6 there are provisions on the effect of a relevant transfer on collective agreements, which may have the effect that a collective bargain, collectively renegotiated pursuant to a transferred collective agreement would preclude any individual whose terms and conditions of employment were governed by that collective bargaining machinery acting so as to refuse the outcome of those negotiations and thereby claiming to retain a connection with the transfer if he were subsequently dismissed. The position is, that Mr Taylor was of a sufficiently senior level in employment with British Rail and the transferee companies that his terms and conditions was not the subject of any collective bargaining arrangements. They were subject to individual negotiation.

30 The fact that the vast majority of his fellows may have accepted the change in terms and conditions put forward which he rejected does not, in our judgment, constitute a proper basis for this Employment Tribunal concluding that, as a result, the proposed change in his terms and conditions had ceased to be a matter connected to the transfer. If it was connected to the transfer for the majority, then it was connected to the transfer for the individual.

31 Furthermore, it is clear from what we have been told today, based on a detailed examination of the schedule of negotiations attached to the Employment Tribunal's decision that the question of removing the contractual redundancy entitlement was only raised in August 1998. That is the matter which the Employment Tribunal have concluded as a matter of fact was connected to the transfer, it being the attempt to rationalise contractual arrangements by changing terms and conditions, held under British Rail which had been transferred across. It is clear that those negotiations with the vast majority of Mr Taylor's fellows must have concluded a matter of a few weeks before his dismissal as a result of his refusal to accept what his fellows had, a relatively short time before, accepted.

32 It seems to us that this Employment Tribunal committed an error, by failing to understand that the relevant negotiations between Mr Taylor as an individual and his colleagues as a group of individuals, had come to an end only a matter of weeks before. It seems, (and we are grateful to both Mrs Outhwaite and Ms Gilmore for drawing our attention to the case) that the reference to the attitude of the majority of employees to the proposed changes and the fact that many employees had accepted it, was a factor, specifically referred to in the Catamaran Cruisers Ltd v William case to be considered on the issue whether a dismissal of an employee refusing to accept a change of contract was or was not reasonable.

33 It appears that this may have infected the reasoning of the Employment Tribunal on this separate issue, being one on which Catamaran is irrelevant. The point about regulation 8(1) is that if the dismissal falls within its terms it is automatically unfair and the question of the reasonableness or otherwise of the employers attitude does not arise as a relevant issue. Therefore, in so far as the Employment Tribunal appear to have been having regard to the kinds of arguments which would have been relevant had they been considering the reasonableness of the Respondent's attitude, on this particular question they plainly misdirected themselves on a matter of law.

34 It therefore follows that we have concluded that this Employment Tribunal misdirected itself and accordingly that their decision that the dismissal did not fall within regulation 8 (1) cannot stand. Ms Gilmore has invited us in the light of that and in the light of the evidence to say that we are in a perfectly good position to draw our own conclusions as a matter of fact as to whether this dismissal did or did not fall within regulation 8 (1). We agree with her that we are in a position to do so.

35 It seems to us abundantly clear that, as the subject matter of the insistence by the Respondent's on the contractual change was an important term which had been transferred across on the occasion of the transfer from British Rail to Connex South Eastern, then the dismissal of Mr Taylor by reason of his refusal to accept that change was a reason connected with the transfer, falling within regulation 8 (1).

36 It therefore follows automatically that Mr Taylor's dismissal was unfair. We so order. The question of remedies will, of course, be remitted to a differently constituted Employment Tribunal."

== See also ==
- UK labour law
