= Cabinet Office Statement of Practice =

UK government standards

The Cabinet Office Statement of Practice (COSoP) is a code of practice, developed by the UK Cabinet Office to support employees when work is being transferred between departments within the Civil Service or across the wider public sector. COSoP provides transferring employees with TUPE-like protection when the TUPE legislation does not apply, as there is not a change of employer. This is because transferring employee will continue to work within the civil or public sector and be employed by the Crown.
