= Equality Act 2006 =

Act of the Parliament of the United Kingdom

Equality Act 2006 (Note: Section 95.)
- Act of Parliament
- Parliament of the United Kingdom
- Long title: An Act to make provision for the establishment of the Commission for Equality and Human Rights; to dissolve the Equal Opportunities Commission, the Commission for Racial Equality and the Disability Rights Commission; to make provision about discrimination on grounds of religion or belief; to enable provision to be made about discrimination on grounds of sexual orientation; to impose duties relating to sex discrimination on persons performing public functions; to amend the Disability Discrimination Act 1995; and for connected purposes.
- Citation: 2006 c. 3
- Territorial extent: England and Wales; Scotland; Northern Ireland (in part); (Note: Section 94.)

Dates
- Royal assent: 16 February 2006
- Commencement: Various (Note: Section 93.)
Other legislation
Amends	Employers' Liability (Compulsory Insurance) Act 1969; House of Commons Disqualification Act 1975; County Courts Act 1984; Legal Aid (Scotland) Act 1986; Legal Aid Act 1988; Trade Union Reform and Employment Rights Act 1993; Disability Discrimination Act 1995; Employment Tribunals Act 1996; Access to Justice Act 1999; Anti-terrorism, Crime and Security Act 2001
Amended by	Charities Act 2006; Transfer of Undertakings (Protection of Employment) Regulations 2006; Employment Equality (Age) Regulations 2006; Disability Discrimination Act 1995 (Amendment) (Further and Higher Education) Regulations 2006; Legal Services Act 2007; Equality Act (Sexual Orientation) Regulations 2007; Government of Wales Act 2006 (Consequential Modifications and Transitional Provisions) Order 2007; Civil Aviation (Access to Air Travel for Disabled Persons and Persons with Reduced Mobility) Regulations 2007; Disability Discrimination Act 1995 (Amendment etc.) (General Qualifications Bodies) (Alteration of Premises and Enforcement) Regulations 2007; Transfer of Functions (Equality) Order 2007; Equality Act 2010; Local Education Authorities and Children's Services Authorities (Integration of Functions) Order 2010; Rail Passengers' Rights and Obligations Regulations 2010; Transfer of Functions (Equality) Order 2010; Treaty of Lisbon (Changes in Terminology) Order 2011; Equality Act 2010 (Public Authorities and Consequential and Supplementary Amendments) Order 2011; Legal Aid, Sentencing and Punishment of Offenders Act 2012; Justice and Security Act 2013; Crime and Courts Act 2013; Enterprise and Regulatory Reform Act 2013; Equality Act 2006 (Dissolution of the Disability Committee) Order 2014; Equality (Amendment and Revocation) (EU Exit) Regulations 2019; Worker Protection (Amendment of Equality Act 2010) Act 2023; Retained EU Law (Revocation and Reform) Act 2023 (Consequential Amendment) Regulations 2023; Equality Act 2010 (Amendment) Regulations 2023

Status: Amended

History of passage through Parliament

Text of statute as originally enacted

Revised text of statute as amended

The Equality Act 2006 (c. 3) is an act of the Parliament of the United Kingdom covering the United Kingdom. The act is a precursor to the Equality Act 2010, which combines all of the equality enactments within Great Britain and provide comparable protections across all equality strands. Those explicitly mentioned by the Equality Act 2006 include age; disability; sex; proposed, commenced or completed gender reassignment; race; religion or belief and sexual orientation. The changes it made were:

- creating the Equality and Human Rights Commission (EHRC) (merging the Commission for Racial Equality, the Equal Opportunities Commission and the Disability Rights Commission)
- outlawing of discrimination on goods and services on the grounds of religion and belief (subject to certain exemptions)
- allowing the Government to introduce regulations outlawing discrimination on the ground of sexual orientation in goods and services, which led to the Sexual Orientation Regulations 2006
- creating a public duty to promote equality on the ground of gender (The Equality Act 2006, section 84, inserting section 76A of the Sex Discrimination Act 1975, now found in section 1 of the Equality Act 2010)

== Overview ==
With the exception of the provision relating to goods and services discrimination in Northern Ireland on the grounds of sexual orientation, the Act relates to equality law in Great Britain, as a separate legislative framework exists for Northern Ireland which also has a separate equality body, the Equality Commission for Northern Ireland (though by and large reflecting the general approach to equality legislation in Great Britain).

== Background ==
In 1998, the Runnymede Trust published a report by Bhikhu Parekh calling for a new Equality Act which would consolidate and advance existing legislation.

The Equality Bill first appeared in the 2004/05 session, but did not make it into law before Parliament was dissolved ahead of the 2005 general election. In its manifesto, the Labour Party promised to reintroduce the Bill, which it duly accomplished upon its reinstatement in Westminster.

At this stage, only "religion or belief" was included in the anti-discrimination clauses. The Labour Party specifically did not wish to ban discrimination on the grounds of sexual orientation.

After the bill was reintroduced, further lobbying by openly gay Peer the Lord Alli succeeded in forcing the government to add homophobic discrimination to the bill.

However, the lateness of this concession meant the extra provisions could not be included substantively in the primary legislation. Instead, legislators agreed to delegate the drafting of regulations to the government. After a public consultation and a protracted debate within the Cabinet, these were eventually laid before Parliament as the Equality Act (Sexual Orientation) Regulations 2007.

Further promised legislation also includes a provision to provide for protection for people in the provision of goods and services on the grounds of gender reassignment in order to comply with an EU Directive.

== Cases under the act ==
In mid-2010, following the June 2010 United Kingdom Budget, which allocated a series of cuts across government departments and the public sector, the Fawcett Society filed an action for judicial review, on the ground that the budget paid no regard to the disparate negative impact on women as it should have under section 84 of the Equality Act 2006 and section 76A of the Sex Discrimination Act 1975. This requires every public authority, not excluding the Treasury or the Cabinet Office, to "have due regard to the need— (a) to eliminate unlawful discrimination and harassment, and (b) to promote equality of opportunity between men and women". It was alleged that the government failed to "have due regard" to the disparate impact of its budget on women.

== Section 93 – Commencement ==
The following orders have been made under this section:

- The Equality Act 2006 (Commencement No. 1) Order 2006 (S.I. 2006/1082 (C.36))
- The Equality Act 2006 (Commencement No. 2) Order 2007 (S.I. 2007/1092 (C.48))
- The Equality Act 2006 (Commencement No. 3 and Savings) Order 2007 (S.I. 2007/2603 (C.100))

== Bibliography ==
- C. O'Cinneide, "The Commission for Equality and Human Rights: A New Institution for New and Uncertain Times" (2007) 36(2) Industrial Law Journal 141
