= Werhof v Freeway Traffic Systems GmbH & Co KG =

European labour law case

- Court: European Court of Justice
- Citation: (2006) C-499/04 [2006] ECR I-2397

Keywords
- Business Transfers Directive, German collective agreements

Werhof v Freeway Traffic Systems GmbH & Co KG (2006) C-499/04 is a European labour law case concerning the minimum floor of requirements in the European Union for the enforceability of a collective agreement after a transfer of a business.

== Facts ==
Mr Werhof claimed that he should get the benefit of a 2.6% wage increase under a 2002 collective agreement between IG Metall and AGV, the Nordrhein-Westfalen Metal and Electricity Federation from Freeway KG, his employer since 1999. Freeway was not a member of AGV, and in 2001 had got Mr Werhof to sign an agreement waiving all individual employment rights to wage increases that he could claim under the prior collective agreement in return for a one off wage payment under a new collective agreement with their present workforce. Freeway KG had previously been DUEWAG AG, which was transferred to Siemens and then became separate, though DUEWAG AG had been a party to the industry collective agreement of AGV. Mr Werhof claimed that he was entitled to the wage increases as updated in the collective agreement, which had transferred to his new employer under the Bürgerliches Gesetzbuch §613a(1), or alternatively under the EU Business Transfers Directive.

== Judgment ==
=== Landesarbeitsgericht ===
The Landesarbeitsgericht Düsseldorf held that under BGB §613a(1), which was meant to implement art 3, it was settled law that Werhof had no claim, but referred to the ECJ whether this was compatible with minimum standards of the Business Transfers Directive article 3.

=== European Court of Justice ===
The ECJ held that where a contract of employment refers to a collective agreement that is binding on a transferor, the transferee, who is not party to it, is not bound by collective agreements subsequent to the one in force at the time of the transfer. It noted that freedom of contract implies that two parties cannot impose obligations on third parties without their consent, but the BTD 2001 infringes that principle to protect employees. It emphasised that this view would be compatible with the principle of freedom of association.

23 First, the general point should be made that a contract is characterised by the principle of freedom of the parties to arrange their own affairs, according to which, in particular, parties are free to enter into obligations with each other. Under that principle, and in a situation such as the one in the main proceedings where the defendant is not a member of any employers’ association and is not bound by any collective agreement, the rights and obligations arising from such an agreement do not therefore apply to it, as a rule. Otherwise, as the Advocate General noted in point 52 of his Opinion, the principle that contracts cannot impose obligations on third parties would be infringed.

24 However, in respect of the transfer of an undertaking and its consequences on employment relationships, unconditional application of the abovementioned principle could result in erosion of the rights which the employee has under his contract of employment and the collective agreement to which the employer transferring the undertaking was party, but not the transferee. That is why the Community legislature sought to ensure that, on transfer of an undertaking, employees enjoy special protection designed to prevent the erosion which could result from application of that principle.

25 Furthermore, according to the case-law of the Court, the Directive is intended to safeguard the rights of employees in the event of a change of employer by allowing them to continue to work for the new employer on the same conditions as those agreed with the transferor (see, inter alia, Case 324/86 Daddy’s Dance Hall [1988] ECR 739, paragraph 9, Case C-362/89 D’Urso and Others [1991] ECR I-4105, paragraph 9, and Case C-399/96 Europièces [1998] ECR I-6965, paragraph 37).

26 It is also settled case-law that the rules of the Directive must be considered to be mandatory, so that it is not possible to derogate from them in a manner unfavourable to employees (see Martin, paragraph 39). It follows that the contracts of employment and employment relationships existing, on the date of the transfer of an undertaking, between the transferor and the workers employed in the undertaking transferred are automatically transferred to the transferee by the mere fact of the transfer of the undertaking (see, to that effect, D’Urso and Others, paragraph 20, and Case C-305/94 Rotsart de Hertaing [1996] ECR I-5927, paragraph 18).

27 Here, the contract of employment of the claimant in the main proceedings refers, as regards wages, to a collective agreement. That clause in the contract of employment is covered by Article 3(1) of the Directive. By virtue of the Directive, the rights and obligations arising from a collective agreement to which the contract of employment refers are automatically transferred to the new owner, even if, as in the main proceedings, the latter is not a party to any collective agreement. Accordingly, the rights and obligations arising out of a collective agreement continue to bind the new owner after the transfer of the business.

28 In respect of the interpretation of Article 3(1) of the Directive, a clause referring to a collective agreement cannot have a wider scope than the agreement to which it refers. Consequently, account must be taken of Article 3(2) of the Directive, which contains limitations to the principle that the collective agreement to which the contract of employment refers is applicable.

29 First, the terms and conditions under that collective agreement are to continue to be observed only until the date of its termination or expiry, or the entry into force or application of another collective agreement. Thus the wording of the Directive does not in any way indicate that the Community legislature intended that the transferee be bound by collective agreements other than the one in force at the time of the transfer and, consequently, that the terms and conditions be subsequently amended through the application of a new collective agreement concluded after the transfer. Such an assessment is, moreover, consistent with the objective of the Directive, which is merely to safeguard the rights and obligations of employees in force on the day of the transfer. On the other hand, the Directive was not intended to protect mere expectations to rights and, therefore, hypothetical advantages flowing from future changes to collective agreements.

30 Secondly, the Member States may limit the period for observing the terms and conditions arising from a collective agreement, provided that that period is not less than one year. In a way, this limitation is subsidiary, since it is applicable if none of the abovementioned situations, that is, termination or expiry of the existing collective agreement, or entry into force or application of a new collective agreement, arises within a period of one year after the transfer.

31 In addition, although in accordance with the objective of the Directive the interests of the employees concerned by the transfer must be protected, those of the transferee, who must be in a position to make the adjustments and changes necessary to carry on his operations, cannot be disregarded.

32 In this connection, in accordance with the Court’s settled case-law, when interpreting the provisions of a directive account must be taken of the principle of the coherence of the Community legal order which requires secondary Community legislation to be interpreted in accordance with the general principles of Community law (see, to that effect, Case C-1/02 Borgmann [2004] ECR I‑3219, paragraph 30).

33 Freedom of association, which also includes the right not to join an association or union (see, to that effect, Eur. Court of H.R., Sigurjónsson v Iceland, judgment of 30 June 1993, Series A, No 264, § 35, and Gustafsson v Sweden, judgment of 25 April 1996, Reports of Judgments and Decisions, 1996-II, p. 637, § 45) is enshrined in Article 11 of the European Convention for the Protection of Human Rights and Fundamental Freedoms signed in Rome on 4 November 1950 and is one of the fundamental rights which, in accordance with the Court’s settled case-law, are protected in the Community legal order (Case C-415/93 Bosman [1995] ECR I‑4921, paragraph 79), as is restated in Article 6(2) EU (see Case C-274/99 P Connolly v Commission [2001] ECR I-1611).

34 If the ‘dynamic’ interpretation, supported by the claimant, of the contractual reference clause mentioned in paragraph 18 of this judgment were applied, that would mean that future collective agreements apply to a transferee who is not party to a collective agreement and that his fundamental right not to join an association could be affected.

35 On the other hand, the ‘static’ interpretation, supported by the defendant in the main proceedings and the German Government, makes it possible to avoid a situation in which the transferee of a business who is not party to a collective agreement is bound by future changes to that agreement. His right not to join an association is thus fully safeguarded.

36 In those circumstances, the claimant cannot maintain that a clause contained in an individual contract of employment and referring to collective agreements concluded in a particular sector must necessarily be ‘dynamic’ and refers, by application of Article 3(1) of the Directive, to collective agreements concluded after the date of transfer of the undertaking.

37 It follows from the foregoing that the answer to the first question must be that Article 3(1) of the Directive must be interpreted as not precluding, in a situation where the contract of employment refers to a collective agreement binding the transferor, that the transferee, who is not party to such an agreement, is not bound by collective agreements subsequent to the one which was in force at the time of the transfer of the business.

== See also ==
- Parkwood-Leisure Ltd v Alemo-Herron [2010] EWCA Civ 24
- Howard Johnson Co v Detroit Local Joint Executive Board, 417 US 249 (1974)
