= Oy Liikenne Ab v Liskojärvi =

- Court: European Court of Justice
- Decided: 25 January 2001
- Citations: (2001) C-172/99, [2001] IRLR 171

Keywords
- Business transfer, TUPE

Oy Liikenne Ab v Pekka Liskojärvi and Pentti Juntunen (2001) C-172/99 is an EU labour law case, concerning the effects of a business transfer on an employee's rights at work.

== Facts ==
Seven local Helsinki bus routes were run by Hakunilan Liikenne. They lost the contract from the Greater Helsinki Joint Board for transport. 45 drivers were dismissed and 33 of them rehired by Liikenne Ab. The contract award procedure was conducted under the Public Service Contracts Directive 92/50/EC, for competitive tendering in public services.

== Judgment ==
The ECJ held that ‘bus transport cannot be regarded as an activity based essentially on manpower, as it requires substantial plant and equipment’. Labour intensivity will matter, but also it is just one of the seven factors of production outlined by the decision in Süzen v Zehnacker Gebäudereingung GmbH that should be taken into account.
