= Süzen v Zehnacker Gebaeudereingung GmbH =

Süzen v Zehnacker Gebäudereinigung GmbH
- Court: European Court of Justice
- Citation: (1997) C-13/95, [1997] ICR 662

Keywords
- Transfer of undertakings

Süzen v Zehnacker Gebäudereinigung GmbH (1997) C-13/95 is a European Union labour law case concerning transfers of undertakings, and the job security rights of employees.

== Facts ==
Ms Süzen worked for a Zehnacker, a cleaning company in a private school of Bad Godesberg. Zehnacker lost the cleaning contract. Lefarth won the bid to take it over. Zehnacker let her go, along with 12 others. She stayed working the same as before.

== Judgment ==
The European Court of Justice held that the lack of any contractual link between transferee and transferor ‘is certainly not conclusive’. That is so because the Directive does not require it. The ‘transfer must relate to a stable economic entity whose activity is not limited to performing one specific works contract’ (Case C-48/94 Rygaard [1995] ECR I-2745, paragraph 20) and an entity is ‘an organized grouping of persons and assets facilitating the exercise of an economic activity which pursues a specific objective’.

14 In order to determine whether the conditions for the transfer of an entity are met, it is necessary to consider all the facts characterizing the transaction in question, including in particular

[1.] the type of undertaking or business, [2.] whether or not its tangible assets, such as buildings and movable property, are transferred, [3.] the value of its intangible assets at the time of the transfer, [4.] whether or not the majority of its employees are taken over by the new employer, [5.] whether or not its customers are transferred, [6.] the degree of similarity between the activities carried on before and after the transfer, and [7.] the period, if any, for which those activities were suspended.

However, all those circumstances are merely single factors in the overall assessment which must be made and cannot therefore be considered in isolation (see, in particular, Spijkers and Redmond Stichting, paragraphs 13 and 24 respectively).

The ECJ further held that the loss of a customer does not mean that the undertaking will ‘thereby cease fully to exist’. Where an entity can ‘function without any significant intangible or tangible assets, the maintenance of its identity following the transaction affecting it cannot, logically, depend on the transfer of such assets.’
