= Equality Act (Sexual Orientation) Regulations 2007 =

United Kingdom statutory instrument

Equality Act (Sexual Orientation) Regulations 2007 (Note: Section 1(1).)
- Statutory Instrument
- Parliament of the United Kingdom
- Citation: SI 2007/1263
- Introduced by: Ruth Kelly
- Territorial extent: England and Wales; Scotland; (Note: Section 1(2).)

Dates
- Made: 17 April 2007
- Commencement: 30 April 2007
Other legislation
Amends	Equality Act 2006
Made under	Equality Act 2006
Revoked by	Equality Act 2010

Status: Revoked

Text of statute as originally enacted

Revised text of statute as amended

The Equality Act (Sexual Orientation) Regulations 2007 (SI 2007/1263) was secondary legislation in the United Kingdom, outlawing discrimination in the provision of goods, facilities, services, education and public functions on the grounds of sexual orientation.

In 2010, these regulations were written into the Equality Act 2010, which revoked the 2007 statutory instrument, meaning that they are no longer in force as a standalone piece of legislation.

== Background ==
Provisions to outlaw discrimination on the grounds of religion or belief were already enshrined in the primary Equality Act 2006. However, the Labour Party had not originally wanted to prohibit discrimination against gays and lesbians. The original Equality Bill, therefore, contained no clauses dealing with homophobic discrimination.

The legislation was made under powers granted by the Equality Act 2006. Sections 81 and 82 of the Equality Act gave the power to make regulations to the Secretary of State and the Office of the First Minister and Deputy First Minister of Northern Ireland, respectively. Regulations made under section 81 cover Great Britain (i.e., England and Wales and Scotland) whereas regulations made under section 82 extend to Northern Ireland.

As the Bill progressed through the House of Lords, amendments by the Lord Alli succeeded in forcing a Government concession; the Labour MP Desmond Turner led a similar revolt in the Commons.

However, it was by then too late to allow the new measures to be added substantively to the Bill. Instead, MPs and Peers agreed to delegate the drafting of regulations to a Government minister, which paved the way for a lengthy public consultation followed by months of Cabinet wrangling.

== Regulations relating to Great Britain ==
The text of the proposed regulations was first laid before Parliament on 7 March 2007. Some faith-based adoption agencies had stated that they would need to close if they were not given an opt-out from having to place children with homosexual couples, as that would be against their religious beliefs. In a statement released from 10 Downing Street on 29 January 2007, Tony Blair said he had considered their objections carefully, but in his view there was no place for discrimination. However, for existing adoption agencies there would be a transitional period, before the regulations come fully into force at the end of 2008.

In the House of Commons, the regulations were adopted by 309 votes to 99. The votes against came mostly Conservatives, plus ten Labour Members (Joe Benton, Tom Clarke, Frank Cook, Jim Dobbin, David Drew, Peter Kilfoyle, Jim McGovern, Alan Meale, Geraldine Smith, and David Taylor), together with four Liberal Democrats (Alan Beith, Colin Breed, Tim Farron, and Bob Russell).

Twenty-nine Conservatives voted for the regulations (Desmond Swayne, James Duddridge, David Cameron, George Osborne, Crispin Blunt, Andrew Tyrie, Andrew Mackay, Nick Herbert, Hugo Swire, Francis Maude, Oliver Letwin, Patrick McLoughlin, Chris Grayling, Michael Gove, Andrew Mitchell, Alan Duncan, Michael Fabricant, Theresa Villiers, Graham Stuart, Andrew Lansley, Bill Wiggin, Peter Ainsworth, Robert Key, Tony Baldry, David Willetts, Nigel Evans, Jeremy Hunt, John Bercow and Eleanor Laing).

In the House of Lords, Peers approved the regulations by a majority of 46, and the regulations came into force on 30 April 2007.

Guidance on the regulations was also issued by the Department for Communities and Local Government.

Archbishop Vincent Nichols of Birmingham declared his opposition to the regulations, saying that they contradicted the Catholic Church's moral values. He supported efforts to have Catholic adoption agencies exempted from sexual orientation regulations, which were ultimately unsuccessful in a judgment given on 21 July 2010. Further to this, the House of Lords was still considering an exemption to the legislation that would let religious agencies abide by their belief-based proscriptions regarding the employment of active homosexuals.

== Regulations relating to Northern Ireland ==
The Equality Act (Sexual Orientation) Regulations (Northern Ireland) 2006 (SR(NI) 2006/439) were made on 8 November 2006 and laid before Parliament under paragraph 7(3) of the Schedule to the Northern Ireland Act 2000 since the Northern Ireland Assembly was suspended. The regulations came into force on 1 January 2007.

Later in January 2007 there was an attempt to pass a motion to pray for an annulment of the regulations in the House of Lords. The resolution failed to pass by a margin of 199 to 68.

In 2007, the Christian Institute (CI) and others sought a judicial review to overturn the Sexual Orientation Regulations in Northern Ireland. Mr Justice Weatherup rejected the CI's complaint, ruling that while a clause relating to harassment (a clause unique to the Northern Irish version of the Regulations) should be set aside, the remainder of the Regulations were to remain in force.

== See also ==
- LGBT rights in the United Kingdom
