= Spijkers v Gebroeders Benedik Abattoir CV =

1986 Dutch/EU labour law

- Court: European Court of Justice
- Citation: (1986) C-24/85, [1986] ECR 1119

Keywords
- Transfer of undertakings

Spijkers v Gebroeders Benedik Abattoir CV (1986) C-24/85 is a Dutch and EU labour law case concerning transfers of undertakings, and the job security rights of employees.

== Facts ==
Mr Spijkers worked for a slaughterhouse owned by Colaris in Ubach over Worms. They transferred the business to Benedik in December, and only he and another were not retained. Operations ceased in December 1982, and Colaris was insolvent by March 1983. Good will and customers had already disappeared.

Attorney General Slynn gave an opinion before the court decision. He said the ‘essential question is whether the transferee is put in a position, as a result of a legal transfer, whereby he can carry on the undertaking or business or part thereof.’

== Judgment ==
The European Court of Justice held that the "decisive question… is whether the entity in question retains its identity". This means a whole range of factors, including customers, goodwill, buildings, tangible assets and employees should be considered. Sale of assets (means of production, as argued by Mr Spijkers) is not necessarily enough by itself. One should ask, is the business "disposed of as a going concern?"
