= Transfers of Undertakings Directive 2001 =

European Union law

The Transfers of Undertakings Directive 2001/23/EC is a European Union law that protects the contracts of employment of people working in businesses that are transferred between owners. It replaced and updated the law previously known as the Acquired Rights Directive 77/187/EC.

== Overview ==
The Directive stipulates that any employee's contract of employment will be transferred automatically on the same terms as before in the event of a transfer of the undertaking. This means that if an employer changes control of the business, the new employer cannot reduce the employees' terms and conditions, unless the Directive's exception criteria are met. This is that there must be a good economic, technical or organisational reason for the change.

Chapter I – Scope and definitions

Article 1 This says the directive applies to legal transfers and mergers of an undertaking. The point to note is that it excludes transfers of company control through a simple purchase of shares, which is the most common way to effect a change in the market for corporate control.

Article 2 This gives definitions of transferor, transferee and the like.

Chapter II – Safeguarding of employees' rights

Article 3 This states the principle that the transferee is bound to the contractual and employment law obligations of the transferor. The transferor has to state what these are beforehand.

Article 4 This provides the idea that dismissals should not take place just because there is a transfer. But dismissals can be made for 'any economic, technical and organisational reason'.

Article 5 Member states can derogate from Art. 3 and 4 where the company is insolvent.

Article 6 This states that employee representatives positions should not change where the undertaking retains autonomy through the transfer. It is talking mainly about unions.

Chapter III – Information and consultation

Article 7 This provides that employers thinking of transfers must consult with the workforce beforehand, through employee representatives.

Chapter IV – Final provisions

Article 8-14 These articles are addressed to the Member States, and talk about implementation maps, and notifications to the Commission of opinions or changes.

== See also ==
- UK labour law
- European labour law
- Transfer of Undertakings (Protection of Employment) Regulations 2006 (SI 2006/246) replacing the Transfer of Undertakings (Protection of Employment) Regulations 1981, the UK labour law
