= List of statutory instruments of the United Kingdom, 2003 =

This is an incomplete list of statutory instruments of the United Kingdom made in 2003.

== 1–100 ==
- The Nationality, Immigration and Asylum Act 2002 (Commencement No. 2) Order 2003 (S.I. 2003 No. 1 (C. 1))
- The Immigration and Asylum Act 1999 (Commencement No. 12) Order 2003 (S.I. 2003 No. 2 (C. 2))
- The Agricultural Holdings (Units of Production) (Wales) Order 2003 (S.I. 2003 No. 4 (W.2))
- Gorchymyn Daliadau Amaethyddol (Unedau Cynhyrchu) (Cymru) 2003 (S.I. 2003 Rhif 4 (Cy.2))
- The Revenue Support Grant (Specified Bodies) (Amendment) (England) Regulations 2003 (S.I. 2003 No. 5)
- The Suppression of Terrorism Act 1978 (Designation of Countries) Order 2003 (S.I. 2003 No. 6)
- The Friendly Societies (Modification of the Corporation Tax Acts) (Amendment) Regulations 2003 (S.I. 2003 No. 23)
- The Value Added Tax (Health and Welfare) Order 2003 (S.I. 2003 No. 24)
- The Prohibition of Keeping or Release of Live Fish (Specified Species) (Amendment) (England) Order 2003 (S.I. 2003 No. 25)
- The National Health Service (Out of Hours Provision of Personal Medical Services and Miscellaneous Amendments) (England) Regulations 2003 (S.I. 2003 No. 26)
- The Police Pensions (Amendment) Regulations 2003 (S.I. 2003 No. 27)
- The Pigs (Records, Identification and Movement) (Interim Measures) (England) (No. 2) (Amendment) Order 2003 (S.I. 2003 No. 28)
- The Sheep and Goats Identification and Movement (Interim Measures) (England) (No. 2) (Amendment) Order 2003 (S.I. 2003 No. 29)
- The Disease Control (Interim Measures) (England) (No. 2) (Amendment) Order 2003 (S.I. 2003 No. 30)
- The Animal Gatherings (Interim Measures) (England) (Amendment) Order 2003 (S.I. 2003 No. 31)
- The Access to the Countryside (Provisional and Conclusive Maps) (England) (Amendment) Regulations 2003 (S.I. 2003 No. 32)
- The Electronic Communications (Universal Service) Regulations 2003 (S.I. 2003 No. 33)
- The Motor Vehicles (Compulsory Insurance) (Information Centre and Compensation Body) Regulations 2003 (S.I. 2003 No. 37)
- The Local Authorities (Capital Finance) (Amendment) (England) Regulations 2003 (S.I. 2003 No. 43)
- The Tax Credits (Miscellaneous Amendments) Regulations 2003 (S.I. 2003 No. 44)
- The Tax Credits (Miscellaneous Amendments) (Northern Ireland) Regulations 2003 (S.I. 2003 No. 45)
- The Public Contracts (Works, Services and Supply) and Utilities Contracts (Amendment) Regulations 2003 (S.I. 2003 No. 46)
- The Financial Services and Markets Act 2000 (Exemption) (Amendment) Order 2003 (S.I. 2003 No. 47)
- The Housing Benefit and Council Tax Benefit (General) Amendment Regulations 2003 (S.I. 2003 No. 48)
- The Health and Social Care Act 2001 (Isles of Scilly) Order 2003 (S.I. 2003 No. 49)
- The National Health Service Reform and Health Care Professions Act 2002 (Isles of Scilly) Order 2003 (S.I. 2003 No. 50)
- The Education (Further Education Institutions Information) (England) (Revocation) Regulations 2003 (S.I. 2003 No. 51)
- The Supply of Beer (Loan Ties, Licensed Premises and Wholesale Prices) (Revocation) Order 2003 (S.I. 2003 No. 52)
- The Health and Social Care Act 2001 (Commencement No. 11) (England) Order 2002 (S.I. 2003 No. 53 (C. 3))
- The Housing (Right to Acquire and Right to Buy) (Designated Rural Areas and Designated Regions) (Wales) Order 2003 (S.I. 2003 No. 54 (W.5))
- Gorchymyn Tai (Hawl i Gaffael a Hawl i Brynu) (Ardaloedd Gwledig Dynodedig a Rhanbarthau Dynodedig) (Cymru) 2003 (S.I. 2003 Rhif 54 (Cy.5))
- The Northern Ireland Act 1998 (Designation of Public Authorities) Order 2003 (S.I. 2003 No. 55)
- The Seeds (Miscellaneous Amendments) Regulations (Wales) 2003 (S.I. 2003 No. 56 (W.6))
- Rheoliadau Hadau (Diwygiadau Amrywiol) (Cymru) 2003 (S.I. 2003 Rhif 56 (Cy.6))
- The Limited Liability Partnerships (Welsh Language Forms) Regulations 2003 (S.I. 2003 No. 61)
- Rheoliadau (Ffurflenni Cymraeg) Partneriaethau Atebolrwydd Cyfyngedig 2003 (S.I. 2003 Rhif 61)
- The Companies (Welsh Language Forms) Regulations 2003 (S.I. 2003 No. 62)
- Rheoliadau (Ffurflenni Cymraeg) Cwmnïau 2003 (S.I. 2003 Rhif 62)
- The Environmental Protection (Duty of Care) (England) (Amendment) Regulations 2003 (S.I. 2003 No. 63)
- The Rules of the Air (Amendment) Regulations 2003 (S.I. 2003 No. 64)
- The Wireless Telegraphy (Exemption) Regulations 2003 (S.I. 2003 No. 74)
- The Tobacco Advertising and Promotion (Sponsorship) Transitional Regulations 2003 (S.I. 2003 No. 77)
- The Proceeds of Crime Act 2002 (Appeals under Part 2) Order 2003 (S.I. 2003 No. 82)
- The State Pension Credit Act 2002 (Commencement No. 3) Order 2003 (S.I. 2003 No. 83 (C.4 )])
- The Finance Act 2002, Section 57(3) and (4)(a), (Appointed Day Order 2003 (S.I. 2003 No. 88 (C. 5)])
- The A64 Trunk Road (Whinmoor Roundabout to County Boundary) (Detrunking) Order 2003 (S.I. 2003 No. 89)
- The A6120 Trunk Road (Weetwood Roundabout to Junction 46 of the M1) (Detrunking) Order 2003 (S.I. 2003 No. 90)
- The A660 Trunk Road (Boundary of The City of Bradford And Leeds City to Weetwood Roundabout) (Detrunking) Order 2003 (S.I. 2003 No. 91)
- The Crown Office Fees Order 2003 (S.I. 2003 No. 92)
- The A596 Trunk Road (Lillyhall to Thursby) (Detrunking) Order 2003 (S.I. 2003 No. 93)
- The A595 Trunk Road (Carlisle City Boundary to Thursby) (Detrunking) Order 2003 (S.I. 2003 No. 94)
- The Road Traffic (Permitted Parking Area and Special Parking Area) (District of Bath and North East Somerset) Order 2003 (S.I. 2003 No. 95)
- The Community Investment Tax Relief (Accreditation of Community Development Finance Institutions) Regulations 2003 (S.I. 2003 No. 96)

== 101–200 ==
- The ABRO Trading Fund (Amendment) Order 2003 (S.I. 2003 No. 105)
- The Education (Induction Arrangements for School Teachers) (Consolidation) (England) (Amendment) Regulations 2003 (S.I. 2003 No. 106)
- The Education (Teachers’ Qualifications and Health Standards) (England) (Amendment) Regulations 2003 (S.I. 2003 No. 107)
- The Road User Charging (Enforcement and Adjudication) (London) (Amendment) Regulations 2003 (S.I. 2003 No. 108)
- The Road User Charging (Charges and Penalty Charges) (London) (Amendment) Regulations 2003 (S.I. 2003 No. 109)
- The Road User Charging and Workplace Parking Levy (Net Proceeds) (England) Regulations 2003 (S.I. 2003 No. 110)
- The A3 Trunk Road (Thursley Junction Slip Roads) Order 2003 (S.I. 2003 No. 111)
- The Common Agricultural Policy (Wine) (England and Northern Ireland) (Amendment) Regulations 2003 (S.I. 2003 No. 114)
- The Electronic Commerce (EC Directive) (Extension) Regulations 2003 (S.I. 2003 No. 115)
- The Police Act 1997 (Criminal Records) (Welsh Language) Regulations 2003 (S.I. 2003 No. 117)
- The Intercountry Adoption (Hague Convention) Regulations 2003 (S.I. 2003 No. 118)
- The Proceeds of Crime Act 2002 (Commencement No. 4, Transitional Provisions and Savings) Order 2003 (S.I. 2003 No. 120 (C. 6)])
- The Scottish Parliamentary Elections (Returning Officers' Charges) Order 2003 (S.I. 2003 No. 122 (S. 1)])
- The Tax Credits (Interest Rate) Regulations 2003 (S.I. 2003 No. 123)
- The Education Act 2002 (Commencement No.4 and Transitional and Saving Provisions) Order 2003 (S.I. 2003 No. 124 (C. 7)])
- The A167 Trunk Road (Junction 59 of the A1(M) to junction 63 of the A1(M)) (Detrunking) Order 2003 (S.I. 2003 No. 125)
- The A1079 Trunk Road (County Boundary to Dunswell Drain) (Detrunking) Order 2003 (S.I. 2003 No. 126)
- The A614 Trunk Road (Longs Corner to Junction 37 of the M62) (Detrunking) Order 2003 (S.I. 2003 No. 127)
- The A63 Trunk Road (County Boundary to Longs Corner) (Detrunking) Order 2003 (S.I. 2003 No. 128)
- The Child Support (Decisions and Appeals) (Amendment) Regulations 2003 (S.I. 2003 No. 129)
- The Bluetongue Order 2003 (S.I. 2003 No. 130)
- The Countryside Access (Dedication of Land as Access Land) (Wales) Regulations 2003 (S.I. 2003 No. 135 (W.9))
- Rheoliadau Mynediad i Gefn Gwlad (Cyflwyno Tir fel Tir Mynediad) (Cymru) 2003 (S.I. 2003 Rhif 135 (Cy.9))
- The Social Security (Overlapping Benefits) Amendment Regulations 2003 (S.I. 2003 No. 136)
- The Police Act 1997 (Criminal Records)(Amendment No. 2) Regulations 2003 (S.I. 2003 No. 137)
- The National Health Service (General Dental Services) and (Dental Charges) (Amendment) (Wales) Regulations 2003 (S.I. 2003 No. 138 (W.10))
- Rheoliadau'r Gwasanaeth Iechyd Gwladol (Gwasanaethau Deintyddol Cyffredinol) a (Ffioedd Deintyddol) (Diwygio) (Cymru) 2003 (S.I. 2003 Rhif 138 (Cy.10))
- The National Health Service (General Medical Services) and (Pharmaceutical Services) (Amendment) (Wales) Regulations 2003 (S.I. 2003 No. 139 (W.11))
- Rheoliadau'r Gwasanaeth Iechyd Gwladol (Gwasanaethau Meddygol Cyffredinol) a (Gwasanaethau Fferyllol) (Diwygio) (Cymru) 2003 (S.I. 2003 Rhif 139 (Cy.11))
- The Education (Teachers' Qualifications and Health Standards) (Amendment) (Wales) Regulations 2003 (S.I. 2003 No. 140 (W.12))
- Rheoliadau Addysg (Cymwysterau a Safonau Iechyd Athrawon) (Diwygio) (Cymru) 2003 (S.I. 2003 Rhif 140 (Cy.12))
- The Countryside Access (Exclusion or Restriction of Access) (Wales) Regulations 2003 (S.I. 2003 No. 142 (W.14))
- Rheoliadau Mynediad i Gefn Gwlad (Gwahardd neu Gyfyngu Mynediad) (Cymru) 2003 (S.I. 2003 Rhif 142 (Cy.14))
- The National Health Service (General Medical Services) (Amendment) (Wales) Regulations 2003 (S.I. 2003 No. 143 (W.15))
- Rheoliadau'r Gwasanaeth Iechyd Gwladol (Gwasanaethau Meddygol Cyffredinol) (Diwygio) (Cymru) 2003 (S.I. 2003 Rhif 143 (Cy.15))
- The Local Authorities (Executive Arrangements) (Discharge of Functions) (Amendment) (Wales) Regulations 2003 (S.I. 2003 No. 147 (W.17))
- Rheoliadau Awdurdodau Lleol (Trefniadau Gweithrediaeth) (Cyflawni Swyddogaethau) (Diwygio) (Cymru) 2003 (S.I. 2003 Rhif 147 (Cy.17))
- The Local Health Boards (Establishment) (Wales) Order 2003 (S.I. 2003 No. 148 (W.18))
- Gorchymyn Byrddau Iechyd Lleol (Sefydlu) (Cymru) 2003 (S.I. 2003 Rhif 148 (Cy.18))
- The Local Health Boards (Constitution, Membership and Procedures) (Wales) Regulations 2003 (S.I. 2003 No. 149 (W.19))
- Rheoliadau Byrddau Iechyd Lleol (Cyfansoddiad, Aelodaeth a Gweithdrefnau) (Cymru) 2003 (S.I. 2003 Rhif 149 (Cy.19))
- The Local Health Boards (Functions) (Wales) Regulations 2003 (S.I. 2003 No. 150 (W.20))
- Rheoliadau'r Byrddau Iechyd Lleol (Swyddogaethau) (Cymru) 2003 (S.I. 2003 Rhif 150 (Cy.20))
- The Sheep Annual Premium (Amendment) (Wales) Regulations 2003 (S.I. 2003 No. 151 (W.21))
- Rheoliadau Premiwm Blynyddol Defaid (Diwygio) (Cymru) 2003 (S.I. 2003 Rhif 151 (Cy.21))
- The Care Standards Act 2000 (Commencement No. 10) and Transitional Provisions (Wales) Order 2003 (S.I. 2003 No. 152 (W.22) (C.8))
- Gorchymyn Deddf Safonau Gofal 2000 (Cychwyn Rhif 10) a Darpariaethau Trosiannol (Cymru) 2003 (S.I. 2003 Rhif 152 (Cy.22) (C.8))
- The Local Authorities Executive Arrangements (Functions and Responsibilities) (Amendment) (Wales) Regulations 2003 (S.I. 2003 No. 153 (W.23))
- Rheoliadau Trefniadau Gweithrediaeth Awdurdodau Lleol (Swyddogaethau a Chyfrifoldebau) (Diwygio) (Cymru) 2003 (S.I. 2003 Rhif 153 (Cy.23))
- The Health, Social Care and Well-being Strategies (Wales) Regulations 2003 (S.I. 2003 No. 154 (W.24))
- Rheoliadau Strategaethau Iechyd, Gofal Cymdeithasol a Llesiant (Cymru) 2003 (S.I. 2003 Rhif 154 (Cy.24))
- The Local Authorities (Alternative Arrangements) (Amendment) (Wales) Regulations 2003 (S.I. 2003 No. 155 (W.25))
- Rheoliadau Awdurdodau Lleol (Trefniadau Amgen) (Diwygio) (Cymru) 2003 (S.I. 2003 Rhif 155 (Cy.25))
- The District of Broadland (Electoral Changes) Order 2003 (S.I. 2003 No. 157)
- The District of Bromsgrove (Electoral Changes) Order 2003 (S.I. 2003 No. 158)
- The Borough of Middlesbrough (Electoral Changes) Order 2003 (S.I. 2003 No. 159)
- The District of North Norfolk (Electoral Changes) Order 2003 (S.I. 2003 No. 160)
- The City of Peterborough (Electoral Changes) Order 2003 (S.I. 2003 No. 161)
- The Borough of Redcar and Cleveland (Electoral Changes) Order 2003 (S.I. 2003 No. 162)
- The Education (School Admissions Code of Practice and School Admission Appeals Code of Practice) (Appointed Day) (England) Order 2003 (S.I. 2003 No.163)
- The Water Resources (Environmental Impact Assessment) (England and Wales) Regulations 2003 (S.I. 2003 No. 164)
- The Land Registration Fees Order 2003 (S.I. 2003 No. 165)
- The Motor Vehicles (Driving Licences) (Amendment) Regulations 2003 (S.I. 2003 No. 166)
- The Sheep and Goats Identification and Movement (Interim Measures) (Wales) (No.2) (Amendment) Order 2003 (S.I. 2003 No. 167 (W.27))
- Gorchymyn Adnabod a Symud Defaid a Geifr (Mesurau Dros Dro) (Cymru) (Rhif 2) (Diwygio) 2003 (S.I. 2003 Rhif 167 (Cy.27))
- The Disease Control (Interim Measures) (Wales) (No.2) (Amendment) Order 2003 (S.I. 2003 No. 168 (W.28))
- Gorchymyn Rheoli Clefydau (Mesurau Dros Dro) (Cymru) (Rhif 2) (Diwygio) 2003 (S.I. 2003 Rhif 168 (Cy.28))
- The Animal Gatherings (Interim Measures) (Wales) (Amendment) Order 2003 (S.I. 2003 No. 169 (W.29))
- Gorchymyn Crynoadau Anifeiliaid (Mesurau Dros Dro) (Cymru) (Diwygio) 2003 (S.I. 2003 Rhif 169 (Cy.29))
- The Pigs (Records, Identification and Movement) (Interim Measures) (Wales) (No. 2) (Amendment) Order 2003 (S.I. 2003 No. 170 (W.30))
- Gorchymyn Moch (Cofnodion, Adnabod a Symud) (Mesurau Dros Dro) (Cymru) (Rhif 2) (Diwygio) 2003 (S.I. 2003 Rhif 170 (Cy.30))
- The Proceeds of Crime Act 2002 (Failure to Disclose Money Laundering: Specified Training) Order 2003 (S.I. 2003 No. 171)
- The Proceeds of Crime Act 2002 (References to Financial Investigators) Order 2003 (S.I. 2003 No. 172)
- The Proceeds of Crime Act 2002 (Crown Servants) Regulations 2003 (S.I. 2003 No. 173)
- The Proceeds of Crime Act 2002 (Application of Police and Criminal Evidence Act 1984 and Police and Criminal Evidence (Northern Ireland) Order 1989) Order 2003 (S.I. 2003 No. 174)
- The Proceeds of Crime Act 2002 (Financial Threshold for Civil Recovery) Order 2003 (S.I. 2003 No. 175)
- The Adoption and Children Act 2002 (Commencement No. 1) (Wales) Order 2003 (S.I. 2003 No. 181 (W.39) (C.9))
- Gorchymyn Deddf Mabwysiadu a Phlant 2002 (Cychwyn Rhif 1) (Cymru) 2003 (S.I. 2003 Rhif 181 (Cy.31) (C.9))
- The Road Vehicles (Construction and Use) (Amendment) Regulations 2003 (S.I. 2003 No. 182)
- The Adoption (Amendment) Rules 2003 (S.I. 2003 No. 183 (L. 1)])
- The Family Proceedings (Amendment) Rules 2003 (S.I. 2003 No. 184 (L. 2)])
- The Non-Contentious Probate (Amendment) Rules 2003 (S.I. 2003 No. 185 (L. 3)])
- The Divorce (Religious Marriages) Act 2002 (Commencement) Order 2003 (S.I. 2003 No. 186 (C. 10)])
- The Copyright (Certification of Licensing Scheme for Educational Recording of Broadcasts) (Open University) Order 2003 (S.I. 2003 No. 187)
- The Copyright (Certification of Licensing Scheme for Educational Recording of Broadcasts and Cable Programmes) (Educational Recording Agency Limited) (Amendment) Order 2003 (S.I. 2003 No. 188)
- The Adoption (Intercountry Aspects) Act 1999 (Commencement No. 3) Order 2003 (S.I. 2003 No. 189 (C.18)])
- The Education (Information as to Provision of Education) (England) (Amendment) Regulations 2003 (S.I. 2003 No. 190)
- The Child Support, Pensions and Social Security Act 2000 (Commencement No. 12) Order 2003 (S.I. 2003 No. 192 (C. 11)])
- The Social Security (Contributions) (Amendment) Regulations 2003 (S.I. 2003 No. 193)
- The Child Support (Applications: Prescribed Date) Regulations 2003 (S.I. 2003 No.194)
- The Local Authorities (Alteration of Requisite Calculations) (England) Regulations 2003 (S.I. 2003 No. 195)

== 201–300 ==
- The Weights and Measures (Standards Amendment)Regulations 2003 (S.I. 2003 No. 214)
- The Disability Discrimination Act 1995 (Commencement No. 10) (Scotland) Order 2003 (S.I. 2003 No. 215 (C.12) (S.2)])
- The East Sussex Hospitals National Health Service Trust (Establishment) and the Eastbourne Hospitals National Health Service Trust and Hastings and Rother National Health Service Trust (Dissolution) Order 2002 (S.I. 2003 No. 216)
- Veterinary Surgeons and Veterinary Practitioners (Registration) (Amendment) Regulations Order ofCouncil 2003 (S.I. 2003 No. 219)
- Motor Vehicles (Driving Licences) (Amendment) (No. 2) Regulations 2003 (S.I. 2003 No. 222)
- The Greater London Authority (Allocation of Grants for Precept Calculations) Regulations 2003 (S.I. 2003 No. 225)
- The Vehicles Crime (Registration of Registration Plate Suppliers) (England and Wales) (Amendment) Regulations 2003 (S.I. 2003 No. 228)
- The Sea Fishing (Restriction on Days at Sea) Order 2003 (S.I. 2003 No. 229)
- The Air Passenger Duty and Other Indirect Taxes (Interest Rate) (Amendment) Regulations 2003 (S.I. 2003 No. 230)
- The Social Security (Child Maintenance Premium and Miscellaneous Amendments) Amendment Regulations 2003 (S.I. 2003 No. 231)
- The Long Residential Tenancies (Principal Forms) (Amendment) (Wales) Regulations 2003 (S.I. 2003 No. 233 (W.33))
- Rheoliadau Tenantiaethau Preswyl Hir (Prif Ffurflenni) (Diwygio) (Cymru) 2003 (S.I. 2003 Rhif 233 (Cy.33))
- The National Endowment for Science, Technology and the Arts (Increase of Endowment) Order 2003 (S.I. 2003 No. 235)
- The Immigration (Designation of Travel Bans) (Amendment) Order 2003 (S.I. 2003 No. 236)
- The Fostering Services (Wales) Regulations 2003 (S.I. 2003 No. 237 (W.35))
- Rheoliadau Gwasanaethau Maethu (Cymru) 2003 (S.I. 2003 Rhif 237 (Cy.35))
- The Allocation of Housing (Wales) Regulations 2003 (S.I. 2003 No. 239 (W.36))
- Rheoliadau Dyrannu Tai (Cymru) 2003 (S.I. 2003 Rhif 239 (Cy.36))
- The Asylum Support (Amendment) Regulations 2003 (S.I. 2003 No. 241)
- The Local Authorities (Capital Finance) (Rate of Discount for 2003/04) (England) Regulations 2003 (S.I. 2003 No. 248)
- The Nationality, Immigration and Asylum Act 2002 (Commencement No. 3) Order 2003 (S.I. 2003 No. 249 (C.13)])
- The National Health Service (General Dental Services Supplementary List) and (General Dental Services) Amendment Regulations 2003 (S.I. 2003 No. 250)
- The Road Traffic (Permitted Parking Area and Special Parking Area) (County of Dorset) (Borough of Christchurch) Order 2003 (S.I. 2003 No. 251)
- The Education (National Curriculum) (Exceptions at Key Stage 4) (England) Regulations 2003 (S.I. 2003 No. 252)
- Animal Gatherings (Interim Measures) (England) Order 2003 (S.I. 2003 No. 253)
- Disease Control (Interim Measures) (England) Order 2003 (S.I. 2003 No. 254)
- The Transport of Animals (Cleansing and Disinfection) (England) Order 2003 (S.I. 2003 No. 255)
- The Regulatory Reform (Credit Unions) Order 2003 (S.I. 2003 No. 256)
- The Tobacco Advertising and Promotion Act 2002 (Commencement No. 3) (Amendment and Transitional Provisions) Order 2003 (S.I. 2003 No. 258 (C. 15)])
- The Regulatory Reform (Assured Periodic Tenancies) (Rent Increases) Order 2003 (S.I. 2003 No. 259)
- The Assured Tenancies and Agricultural Occupancies (Forms) (Amendment) (England) Regulations 2003 (S.I. 2003 No. 260)
- The Social Security (Industrial Injuries) (Prescribed Diseases) Amendment Regulations 2003 (S.I. 2003 No. 270)
- The Education (Funding for Teacher Training) Designation Order 2003 (S.I. 2003 No. 271)
- The Countryside and Rights of Way Act 2000 (Commencement No. 3) Order 2003 (S.I. 2003 No. 272 (C. 16)])
- The Social Security Fraud Act 2001 (Commencement No. 6) Order 2003 (S.I. 2003 No.273 (C.17)])
- The Income and Corporation Taxes (Electronic Communications) Regulations 2003 (S.I. 2003 No. 282)
- The National Assembly for Wales (Representation of the People) Order 2003 (S.I. 2003 No. 284)
- The Industrial Training Levy (Engineering Construction Board) Order 2003 (S.I. 2003 No. 285)
- The Industrial Training Levy (Construction Board) Order 2003 (S.I. 2003 No. 286)
- The Education (Pupil Referral Units) (Appeals Against Permanent Exclusion) (Wales) Regulations 2003 (S.I. 2003 No. 287 (W.39))
- Rheoliadau Addysg (Unedau Cyfeirio Disgyblion) (Apelau yn erbyn Gwaharddiadau Parhaol) (Cymru) 2003 (S.I. 2003 Rhif 287 (Cy.39))
- The Adoption and Children Act 2002 (Commencement No. 2) Order 2003 (S.I. 2003 No. 288 (C. 14)])
- The Hill Farm Allowance Regulations 2003 (S.I. 2003 No. 289)
- The Proceeds of Crime Act 2002 (Recovery from Pension Schemes) Regulations 2003 (S.I. 2003 No. 291)
- The Trunk Road Charging Schemes (Bridges and Tunnels) (Keeping of Accounts) (England) Regulations 2003 (S.I. 2003 No. 298)
- The Welfare of Farmed Animals (England) (Amendment) Regulations 2003 (S.I. 2003 No. 299)
- The Road Traffic (Vehicle Emissions) (Fixed Penalty) (Wales) Regulations 2003 (S.I. 2003 No. 300 (W.42))
- Rheoliadau Traffig Ffyrdd (Allyriadau Cerbydau) (Cosbau Penodedig) 2003 (S.I. 2003 Rhif 300 (Cy.42))

== 301–400 ==
- The National Health Service (Optical Charges and Payments) (Amendment) (Wales) Regulations 2003 (S.I. 2003 No. 301 (W.43))
- Rheoliadau'r Gwasanaeth Iechyd Gwladol (Ffioedd a Thaliadau Optegol) (Diwygio) (Cymru) 2003 (S.I. 2003 Rhif 301 (Cy.43))
- The Plastic Materials and Articles in Contact with Food (Amendment) (Wales) Regulations 2003 (S.I. 2003 No. 302 (W.44))
- Rheoliadau Deunyddiau ac Eitemau Plastig mewn Cysylltiad â Bwyd (Diwygio) (Cymru) 2003 (S.I. 2003 Rhif 302 (Cy.44))
- The Credit Unions Act 1979 (Commencement No. 3) Order 2003 (S.I. 2003 No. 306 (C.19)])
- The Assured Tenancies and Agricultural Occupancies (Forms) (Amendment) (Wales) Regulations 2003 (S.I. 2003 No. 307 (W.46))
- Rheoliadau Tenantiaethau Sicr a Meddianaethau Amaethyddol Sicr (Ffurflenni) (Diwygio) (Cymru) 2003 (S.I. 2003 Rhif 307 (Cy.46))
- The Housing Benefit and Council Tax Benefit (General) Amendment (No.2) Regulations 2003 (S.I. 2003 No. 308)
- The District of Rutland (Electoral Changes) Order 2003 (S.I. 2003 No. 322)
- The Antarctic (Amendment) Regulations 2003 (S.I. 2003 No. 323)
- The Social Security Pensions (Low Earnings Threshold) Order 2003 (S.I. 2003 No. 324)
- The Housing Benefit and Council Tax Benefit (State Pension Credit) Regulations 2003 (S.I. 2003 No. 325)
- The Bluetongue (Wales) Order 2003 (S.I. 2003 No. 326 (W.47))
- Gorchymyn y Tafod Glas (Cymru) 2003 (S.I. 2003 Rhif 326 (Cy.47))
- The Child Support (Miscellaneous Amendments) Regulations 2003 (S.I. 2003 No. 328)
- The Rating Lists (Valuation Date) (England) Order 2003 (S.I. 2003 No. 329)
- The Electronic Communications (Market Analysis) Regulations 2003 (S.I. 2003 No. 330)
- The Children (Allocation of Proceedings) (Amendment) Order 2003 (S.I. 2003 No. 331 (L.4)])
- The Child Minding and Day Care (Suspension of Registration) (England) Regulations 2003 (S.I. 2003 No. 332)
- The Proceeds of Crime Act 2002 (Commencement No. 5, Transitional Provisions, Savings and Amendment) Order 2003 (S.I. 2003 No. 333 (C. 20)])
- The Proceeds of Crime Act 2002 (Investigations in England, Wales and Northern Ireland: Code of Practice) Order 2003 (S.I. 2003 No. 334)
- The Proceeds of Crime Act 2002 (Disclosure of Information) Order 2003 (S.I. 2003 No. 335)
- The Proceeds of Crime Act 2002 (Exemptions from Civil Recovery) Order 2003 (S.I. 2003 No. 336)
- The Child Support, Pensions and Social Security Act 2000 (Commencement No.13) Order 2003 (S.I. 2003 No. 346 (C. 21)])
- The Child Support (Transitional Provision)(Miscellaneous Amendments) Regulations 2003 (S.I. 2003 No. 347)
- School Governance (Constitution) (England) Regulations 2003 (S.I. 2003 No. 348)
- The Local Authorities (Goods and Services) (Public Bodies) (England) Order 2003 (S.I. 2003 No. 354)
- The Adoption (Intercountry Aspects) Act 1999 (Commencement No. 9) Order 2003 (S.I. 2003 No. 362 (C. 22)])
- The Housing Benefit (General) Amendment Regulations 2003 (S.I. 2003 No. 363)
- The Civil Procedure (Amendment) Rules 2003 (S.I. 2003 No. 364 (L. 5)])
- Care Standards Act 2000 (Commencement No.17 (England) and Transitional and Savings Provisions) Order 2003 (S.I. 2003 No. 365 (C. 23)])
- The Adoption and Children Act 2002 (Commencement No.3) Order 2003 (S.I. 2003 No. 366 (C. 24)])
- The Voluntary Adoption Agencies and the Adoption Agencies (Miscellaneous Amendments) Regulations 2003 (S.I. 2003 No. 367)
- The National Care Standards Commission (Fees and Frequency of Inspections) (Adoption Agencies) Regulations 2003 (S.I. 2003 No. 368)
- National Care Standards Commission (Registration) (Amendment) Regulations 2003 (S.I. 2003 No. 369)
- The Local Authority Adoption Service (England) Regulations 2003 (S.I. 2003 No. 370)
- The Consistent Financial Reporting (England) Regulations 2003 (S.I. 2003 No. 373)
- Court Funds (Amendment) Rules 2003 (S.I. 2003 No. 375 (L. 6)])
- The Education (Residential Trips)(Prescribed Tax Credits) (England) Regulations 2003 (S.I. 2003 No. 381)
- The Education (School Lunches) (Prescribed Requirements) (England) Order 2003 (S.I. 2003 No. 382)
- The Education (Free School Lunches) (Prescribed Tax Credits) (England) Order 2003 (S.I. 2003 No. 383)
- Greater London Magistrates' Courts Authority (Constitution) (Amendment) Regulations 2003 (S.I. 2003 No. 385)
- The General Teaching Council for Wales (Constitution) (Amendment) Regulations 2003 (S.I. 2003 No. 389 (W.51))
- Rheoliadau Cyngor Addysgu Cyffredinol Cymru (Cyfansoddiad) (Diwygio) 2003 (S.I. 2003 Rhif 389 (Cy.51))
- The Town and Country Planning (Referrals and Appeals) (Written Representations Procedure) (Wales) Regulations 2003 (S.I. 2003 No. 390 (W.52))
- Rheoliadau Cynllunio Gwlad a Thref (Atgyfeiriadau ac Apelau) (Gweithdrefn Sylwadau Ysgrifenedig) (Cymru) 2003 (S.I. 2003 Rhif 390 (Cy.52))
- The Education (National Curriculum) (Foundation Stage Early Learning Goals) (England) Order 2003 (S.I. 2003 No. 391)
- The Tax Credits Act 2002 (Commencement No. 2) Order 2003 (S.I. 2003 No. 392 (C. 25)])
- The Traffic Signs (Amendment) General Directions 2003 (S.I. 2003 No. 393)
- The Town and Country Planning (Enforcement Notices and Appeals) (Wales) Regulations 2003 (S.I. 2003 No. 394 (W.53))
- Rheoliadau Cynllunio Gwlad a Thref (Hysbysiadau Gorfodi ac Apelau) (Cymru) 2003 (S.I. 2003 Rhif 394 (Cy.53))
- The Town and Country Planning (Enforcement) (Written Representations Procedure) (Wales) Regulations 2003 (S.I. 2003 No. 395 (W.54))
- Rheoliadau Cynllunio Gwlad a Thref (Gorfodi) (Gweithdrefn Sylwadau Ysgrifenedig) (Cymru) 2003 (S.I. 2003 Rhif 395 (Cy.54))
- The Tobacco Advertising and Promotion Act 2002 (Commencement No. 6) Order 2003 (S.I. 2003 No. 396 (C. 26)])
- The Wireless Telegraphy (Public Fixed Wireless Access Licences) (Amendment) Regulations 2003 (S.I. 2003 No. 397)
- The Local Authorities (Referendums) (Petitions and Directions) (Amendment) (Wales) Regulations 2003 (S.I. 2003 No. 398 (W.55))
- Rheoliadau Awdurdodau Lleol (Refferenda) (Deisebau a Chyfarwyddiadau) (Diwygio) (Cymru) 2003 (S.I. 2003 Rhif 398 (Cy.55))
- The Movement of Animals (Restrictions) (Wales) Order 2003 (S.I. 2003 No. 399 (W.56))
- Gorchymyn Symud Anifeiliaid (Cyfyngiadau) (Cymru) 2003 (S.I. 2003 Rhif 399 (Cy.56))
- The Social Security (Work-focused Interviews for Lone Parents) Amendment Regulations 2003 (S.I. 2003 No.400)

== 401–500 ==
- The Nuclear Industries Security Regulations 2003 (S.I. 2003 No. 403)
- The Building Societies Act 1986 (Electronic Communications) Order 2003 (S.I. 2003 No. 404)
- The Protection of Military Remains Act 1986 (Designation of Vessels and Controlled Sites) (Amendment) Order 2003 (S.I. 2003 No.405)
- The M4 Motorway Slip Road (Junction 44, Lon-Las) Scheme 2003 (S.I. 2003 No. 406 (W.57))
- Cynllun Fordd Ymuno Traffordd yr M4 (Cyffordd 44, Lô n-Las) 2003 (S.I. 2003 Rhif 406 (Cy.57))
- The Scotland Act 1998 (Agency Arrangements) (Specification) Order 2003 (S.I. 2003 No. 407 (S. 3)])
- The European Convention on Extradition (Amendment) Order 2003 (S.I. 2003 No. 408)
- The Scottish Parliament (Disqualification) Order 2003 (S.I. 2003 No. 409 (S. 4)])
- The Strategic Investment and Regeneration of Sites (Northern Ireland) Order 2003 (S.I. 2003 No. 410 (N.I. 1)])
- The Agricultural Subsidies (Appeals) (Wales) (Amendment) Regulations 2003 (S.I. 2003 No. 411 (W.58))
- Rheoliadau Cymorthdaliadau Amaethyddol (Apelau) (Cymru) (Diwygio) 2003 (S.I. 2003 Rhif 411 (Cy.58))
- The Housing (Northern Ireland) Order 2003 (S.I. 2003 No. 412 (N.I. 2)])
- The Marriage (Northern Ireland) Order 2003 (S.I. 2003 No. 413 (N.I. 3)])
- The Non-Domestic Rating (Demand Notices) (Amendment) (Wales) Regulations 2003 (S.I. 2003 No. 414 (W.59))
- Rheoliadau Ardrethu Annomestig (Hysbysiadau Galw am Dalu) (Diwygio) (Cymru) 2003 (S.I. 2003 Rhif 414 (Cy.59))
- The Scotland Act 1998 (Transfer of Functions to the Scottish Ministers etc.) Order 2003 (S.I. 2003 No. 415 (S. 5)])
- The Prohibition of Keeping or Release of Live Fish (Specified Species) (Amendment) (Wales) Order 2003 (S.I. 2003 No. 416 (W.60))
- Gorchymyn Gwahardd Cadw neu Ollwng Pysgod Byw (Rhywogaethau Penodedig) (Diwygio) (Cymru) 2003 (S.I. 2003 Rhif 416 (Cy.60))
- The Protection of Children and Vulnerable Adults (Northern Ireland) Order 2003 (S.I. 2003 No. 417 (N.I. 4)])
- The Audit and Accountability (Northern Ireland) Order 2003 (S.I. 2003 No. 418 (N.I. 5)])
- The Energy (Northern Ireland) Order 2003 (S.I. 2003 No. 419 (N.I. 6)])
- The Budget (Northern Ireland) Order 2003 (S.I. 2003 No. 420 (N.I. 7)])
- The Crown Court (Confiscation, Restraint and Receivership) Rules 2003 (S.I. 2003 No. 421 (L. 7)])
- The Crown Court (Amendment) Rules 2003 (S.I. 2003 No. 422 (L.8)])
- The Magistrates' Courts (Amendment) Rules 2003 (S.I. 2003 No. 423 (L. 9)])
- The Education and Libraries (Northern Ireland) Order 2003 (S.I. 2003 No. 424 (N.I. 12)])
- The Proceeds of Crime Act 2002 (Investigations in different parts of the United Kingdom) Order 2003 (S.I. 2003 No. 425)
- The Northern Ireland Arms Decommissioning Act 1997 (Amnesty Period) Order 2003 (S.I. 2003 No. 426)
- The Terrorism Act 2000 (Continuance of Part VII) Order 2003 (S.I. 2003 No. 427)
- The Criminal Appeal (Confiscation, Restraint and Receivership) Rules 2003 (S.I. 2003 No. 428 (L. 10)])
- The Biocidal Products (Amendment) Regulations 2003 (S.I. 2003 No. 429)
- The Planning (Amendment) (Northern Ireland) Order 2003 (S.I. 2003 No. 430 (N.I. 8)])
- The Health and Personal Social Services (Quality, Improvement and Regulation) (Northern Ireland) Order 2003 (S.I. 2003 No. 431 (N.I. 9)])
- The European Communities (Designation) Order 2003 (S.I. 2003 No. 432)
- The Air Navigation (Overseas Territories) (Amendment) Order 2003 (S.I. 2003 No. 433)
- The Naval, Military and Air Forces Etc. (Disablement and Death) Service Pensions Amendment Order 2003 (S.I. 2003 No. 434)
- Access to Justice (Northern Ireland) Order 2003 (S.I. 2003 No. 435 (N.I. 10)])
- The European Convention on Extradition (Fiscal Offences) (Amendment) Order 2003 (S.I. 2003 No. 436)
- The National Assembly for Wales (Disqualification) Order 2003 (S.I. 2003 No. 437)
- The Public Records (Designation of Bodies) Order 2003 (S.I. 2003 No. 438)
- The Commissioner for Children and Young People (Northern Ireland) Order 2003 (S.I. 2003 No. 439 (N.I. 11)])
- The Financing of Maintained Schools (England) Regulations 2003 (S.I. 2003 No. 453)
- The Social Security (Working Tax Credit and Child Tax Credit) (Consequential Amendments) Regulations 2003 (S.I. 2003 No. 455)
- The Bermuda Constitution (Amendment) Order 2003 (S.I. 2003 No. 456)
- The Child Benefit and Guardian's Allowance (Transfer of Staff) (Northern Ireland) Order 2003 (S.I. 2003 No.457)
- The Proceeds of Crime Act (Appeals under Part 4) Order 2003 (S.I. 2003 No. 458)
- The Immigration Services Commissioner (Designated Professional Body) (Fee) Order 2003 (S.I. 2003 No. 460)
- The Fish Labelling (England) Regulations 2003 (S.I. 2003 No. 461)
- The Tax Credits (Approval of Home Child Care Providers) Scheme 2003 (S.I. 2003 No. 463)
- The Town and Country Planning (Costs of Inquiries etc.) (Standard Daily Amount) (England) Regulations 2003 (S.I. 2003 No. 464)
- The Aggregates Levy (Registration and Miscellaneous Provisions) (Amendment) Regulations 2003 (S.I. 2003 No. 465)
- The Aggregates Levy (General) (Amendment) Regulations 2003 (S.I. 2003 No. 466)
- The Customs (Presentation of Goods for Export) Regulations 2003 (S.I. 2003 No. 467)
- The Education (Additional Functions of Her Majesty's Chief Inspector of Schools in England) Order 2003 (S.I. 2003 No. 469)
- The Social Security (Claims and Payments) Amendment Regulations 2003 (S.I. 2003 No.470)
- The Social Fund Maternity and Funeral Expenses (General) Amendment Regulations 2003 (S.I. 2003 No.471)
- The Payments to the Churches Conservation Trust Order 2003 (S.I. 2003 No. 472)
- The Local Health Boards (Transfer of Property, Rights and Liabilities) (Wales) Order 2003 (S.I. 2003 No. 473 (W.63))
- Gorchymyn y Byrddau Iechyd Lleol (Trosglwyddo Eiddo, Hawliau a Rhwymedigaethau) (Cymru) 2003 (S.I. 2003 Rhif 473 (Cy.63))
- The Food Labelling (Amendment) (England) Regulations 2003 (S.I. 2003 No. 474)
- The Education (Budget Statements) (England) Regulations 2003 (S.I. 2003 No. 475)
- The Rent Officers (Housing Benefit Functions) Amendment Order 2003 (S.I. 2003 No. 478)
- The Animal Gatherings (Interim Measures) (Wales) Order 2003 (S.I. 2003 No. 481 (W.67))
- Gorchymyn Crynoadau Anifeiliaid (Mesurau Dros Dro) (Cymru) 2003 (S.I. 2003 Rhif 481 (Cy.67))
- The Transport of Animals (Cleansing and Disinfection) (Wales) Order 2003 (S.I. 2003 No. 482 (W.68))
- Gorchymyn Cludo Anifeiliaid (Glanhau a Diheintio) (Cymru) 2003 (S.I. 2003 Rhif 482 (Cy.68))
- The Disease Control (Interim Measures) (Wales) Order 2003 (S.I. 2003 No. 483 (W.69))
- Gorchymyn Rheoli Clefydau (Mesurau Dros Dro) (Cymru) 2003 (S.I. 2003 Rhif 483 (Cy.69))
- The Cross-Border Payments in Euro Regulations 2003 (S.I. 2003 No. 488)
- The Whole of Government Accounts (Designation of Bodies) Order 2003 (S.I. 2003 No. 489)
- The Civil Procedure (Modification of Enactments) Order 2003 (S.I. 2003 No. 490)
- The Child Benefit and Guardian's Allowance (Administration) Regulations 2003 (S.I. 2003 No. 492)
- The Child Benefit (General) Regulations 2003 (S.I. 2003 No. 493)
- The Child Benefit and Guardian's Allowance (Administrative Arrangements) Regulations 2003 (S.I. 2003 No. 494)
- The Guardian's Allowance (General) Regulations 2003 (S.I. 2003 No. 495)
- The Dartford-Thurrock Crossing (Amendment) Regulations 2003 (S.I. 2003 No. 496)
- The Commission for Patient and Public Involvement in Health (Functions) Amendment Regulations 2003 (S.I. 2003 No. 497)
- The Housing (Right to Buy) (Limits on Discount) (Amendment) Order 2003 (S.I. 2003 No. 498)
- The Social Security Contributions and Benefits Act 1992 (Application of Parts 12ZA and 12ZB to Adoptions from Overseas) Regulations 2003 (S.I. 2003 No. 499)
- The Statutory Paternity Pay (Adoption) and Statutory Adoption Pay (Adoptions from Overseas) Regulations 2003 (S.I. 2003 No. 500)

== 501–600 ==
- The Care Standards Act 2000 (Commencement No.11) (Wales) Order 2003 (S.I. 2003 No. 501 (W.70) (C.27))
- Gorchymyn Deddf Safonau Gofal 2000 (Cychwyn Rhif 11) (Cymru) 2003 (S.I. 2003 Rhif 501 (Cy.70) (C.27))
- The Sheep and Goats Identification and Movement (Interim Measures) (England) (No. 2) (Amendment No. 2) Order 2003 (S.I. 2003 No. 502)
- The General Teaching Council for Wales (Disciplinary Functions) (Amendment) Regulations 2003 (S.I. 2003 No. 503 (W.71))
- Rheoliadau Cyngor Addysgu Cyffredinol Cymru (Swyddogaethau Disgyblu) (Diwygio) 2003 (S.I. 2003 Rhif 503 (Cy.71))
- The Dual-Use Items (Export Control) (Amendment) Regulations 2003 (S.I. 2003 No. 504)
- The Health Protection Agency (Yr Asiantaeth Diogelu Iechyd) (Establishment) Order 2003 (S.I. 2003 No. 505)
- The Health Protection Agency (Yr Asiantaeth Diogelu Iechyd) Regulations 2003 (S.I. 2003 No. 506)
- The School Organisation Proposals by the Learning and Skills Council for England Regulations 2003 (S.I. 2003 No. 507)
- The Gaming Act (Variation of Fees) (England and Wales) Order 2003 (S.I. 2003 No. 508)
- The Gaming Act (Variation of Fees) (England and Wales and Scotland) Order 2003 (S.I. 2003 No. 509)
- The Oxford and Cherwell College (Incorporation) Order 2003 (S.I. 2003 No. 510)
- The Social Security (Miscellaneous Amendments) Regulations 2003 (S.I. 2003 No. 511)
- The Patents Act 1977 (Electronic Communications) Order 2003 (S.I. 2003 No. 512)
- The Patents (Electronic Communications) (Amendment) Rules 2003 (S.I. 2003 No. 513)
- The Oxford and Cherwell College (Government) Regulations 2003 (S.I. 2003 No. 514)
- The Local Authorities (Capital Finance) (Amendment No. 2) (England) Regulations 2003 (S.I. 2003 No. 515)
- The Rugby College of Further Education (Dissolution) Order 2003 (S.I. 2003 No. 516)
- The Social Security Revaluation of Earnings Factors Order 2003 (S.I. 2003 No. 517)
- The Immigration Appeals (Family Visitor) Regulations 2003 (S.I. 2003 No. 518)
- The Police Authorities (Best Value) Performance Indicators Order 2003 (S.I. 2003 No. 519)
- The Police Act 1997 (Criminal Records) (Amendment No. 3) Regulations 2003 (S.I. 2003 No. 520)
- The Social Security (Credits) Amendment Regulations 2003 (S.I. 2003 No. 521)
- The Council Tax (Administration and Enforcement) (Amendment) (Wales) Regulations 2003 (S.I. 2003 No. 522 (W.72))
- Rheoliadau'r Dreth Gyngor (Gweinyddu a Gorfodi) (Diwygio) (Cymru) 2003 (S.I. 2003 Rhif 522 (Cy.72))
- The Education (Governors' Allowances) (England) Regulations 2003 (S.I. 2003 No. 523)
- The Guaranteed Minimum Pensions Increase Order 2003 (S.I. 2003 No. 524)
- The Police Reform Act 2002 (Commencement) (Wales) Order 2003 (S.I. 2003 No. 525 (W.73) (C.28))
- Gorchymyn Deddf Diwygio'r Heddlu 2002 (Cychwyn) (Cymru) 2003 (S.I. 2003 Rhif 525 (Cy.73) (C.28))
- The Social Security Benefits Up-rating Order 2003 (S.I. 2003 No. 526)
- The Police Regulations 2003 (S.I. 2003 No. 527)
- The Police (Efficiency) (Amendment) Regulations 2003 (S.I. 2003 No. 528)
- The Tir Gofal (Amendment) (Wales) Regulations 2003 (S.I. 2003 No. 529 (W.74))
- Rheoliadau Tir Gofal (Diwygio) (Cymru) 2003 (S.I. 2003 Rhif 529 (Cy.74))
- The Local Government (Best Value) Performance Indicators and Performance Standards Order 2003 (S.I. 2003 No. 530)
- The Proceeds of Crime Act 2002 (Commencement No. 5) (Amendment of Transitional Provisions) Order 2003 (S.I. 2003 No. 531 (C. 29)])
- The Value Added Tax (Amendment) Regulations 2003 (S.I. 2003 No. 532)
- The Accounts and Audit Regulations 2003 (S.I. 2003 No. 533)
- The Care Homes (Amendment) Regulations 2003 (S.I. 2003 No. 534)
- The Police Pensions (Amendment) (No. 2) Regulations 2003 (S.I. 2003 No. 535)
- The Income Tax (Sub-contractors in the Construction Industry and Employments) (Amendment) Regulations 2003 (S.I. 2003 No. 536)
- The Education Act 2002 (Academies) (Consequential Amendments) (England) Regulations 2003 (S.I. 2003 No. 537)
- The Financing of Maintained Schools (Amendment) (Wales) Regulations 2003 (S.I. 2003 No. 538 (W.75))
- Rheoliadau Ariannu Ysgolion a Gynhelir (Diwygio) (Cymru) 2003 (S.I. 2003 Rhif 538 (Cy.75))
- The British Nationality (British Overseas Territories) (Amendment) Regulations 2003 (S.I. 2003 No. 539)
- The British Nationality (Hong Kong) (Amendment) Regulations 2003 (S.I. 2003 No. 540)
- The Immigration Employment Document (Fees) Regulations 2003 (S.I. 2003 No. 541)
- The Education (Supply of Information) (Wales) Regulations 2003 (S.I. 2003 No. 542 (W.76))
- Rheoliadau Addysg (Cyflenwi Gwybodaeth) (Cymru) 2003 (S.I. 2003 Rhif 542 (Cy.76))
- The Education (Induction Arrangements for School Teachers) (Wales) Regulations 2003 (S.I. 2003 No. 543 (W.77))
- Rheoliadau (Trefniadau Ymsefydlu ar gyfer Athrawon Ysgol) (Cymru) 2003 (S.I. 2003 Rhif 543 (Cy.77))
- The Westminster Education Action Zone (Extension) Order 2003 (S.I. 2003 No. 544)
- The Feedingstuffs (Zootechnical Products) (Amendment) Regulations 2003 (S.I. 2003 No. 545)
- Health and Safety (Fees) Regulations 2003 (S.I. 2003 No. 547)
- The British Nationality (General) Regulations 2003 (S.I. 2003 No. 548)
- The Immigration (European Economic Area) (Amendment) Regulations 2003 (S.I. 2003 No. 549)
- The Registered Designs Regulations 2003 (S.I. 2003 No. 550)
- The Measuring Instruments (EEC Requirements) (Fees) (Amendment) Regulations 2003 (S.I. 2003 No. 551)
- The Water Industry (Charges) (Vulnerable Groups) (Amendment) Regulations 2003 (S.I. 2003 No. 552)
- The Education Maintenance Allowance (Pilot Areas) (Amendment) Regulations 2003 (S.I. 2003 No. 553)
- The South of England Virtual Education Action Zone (Extension) Order 2003 (S.I. 2003 No. 554)
- The Great Yarmouth Achievement Education Action Zone (Extension) Order 2003 (S.I. 2003 No. 555)
- The Derby North East Education Action Zone (Extension) Order 2003 (S.I. 2003 No. 556)
- The North Stockton Community Education Action Zone (Extension) Order 2003 (S.I. 2003 No. 557)
- The Action for Education and Employment South East Sheffield Education Action Zone (Extension) Order 2003 (S.I. 2003 No. 558)
- The Sea Fishing (Enforcement of Community Control Measures) (Wales) (Amendment) Order 2003 (S.I. 2003 No. 559 (W.79))
- Gorchymyn Pysgota Môr (Gorfodi Mesurau Rheoli'r Gymuned) (Cymru) (Diwygio) 2003 (S.I. 2003 Rhif 559 (Cy.79))
- The North West Shropshire Education Action Zone (Extension) Order 2003 (S.I. 2003 No. 560)
- The Bristol Education Action Zone (Extension) Order 2003 (S.I. 2003 No. 561)
- The Farm Waste Grant (Nitrate Vulnerable Zones)(England) Scheme 2003 (S.I. 2003 No. 562)
- The Railways (Safety Case) (Amendment) Regulations 2003 (S.I. 2003 No. 579)
- The Private Hire Vehicles (London) Act 1998 (Commencement No. 2) Order 2003 (S.I. 2003 No. 580 (C. 30)])
- The Motor Vehicles (Type Approval for Goods Vehicles) (Great Britain) (Amendment) Regulations 2003 (S.I. 2003 No. 582)
- The National Health Service (Charges for Drugs and Appliances) Amendment Regulations 2003 (S.I. 2003 No. 585)
- The National Health Service (Dental Charges) Amendment Regulations 2003 (S.I. 2003 No. 586)
- The Waste Management Licensing (Amendment) (England) Regulations 2003 (S.I. 2003 No. 595)
- The Environmental Protection (Waste Recycling Payments) (Amendment) (England) Regulations 2003 (S.I. 2003 No. 596)
- The Social Security (Industrial Injuries) (Dependency) (Permitted Earnings Limits) Order 2003 (S.I. 2003 No. 600)

== 601–700 ==
- The Social Security Benefits Up-rating Regulations 2003 (S.I. 2003 No. 601)
- The Environmental Protection (Controls on Hexachloroethane) Regulations 2003 (S.I. 2003 No. 602)
- The Finance Act 2002, section 123, (Appointed Day) Order 2003 (S.I. 2003 No. 603 (C.31)])
- The Climate Change Levy (General) (Amendment) Regulations 2003 (S.I. 2003 No. 604)
- The Landfill Tax (Amendment) Regulations 2003 (S.I. 2003 No. 605)
- The Education Act 2002 (Commencement No. 2 and Savings and Transitional Provisions) (Amendment) Order 2003 (S.I. 2003 No. 606 (C.32)])
- The Shellfish (Specified Sea Area) (Prohibition of Fishing Methods) (Wales) Order 2003 (S.I. 2003 No. 607 (W.81))
- Gorchymyn Pysgod Cregyn (Ardal Fôr Benodedig) (Gwahardd Dulliau Pysgota) (Cymru) 2003 (S.I. 2003 Rhif 607 (Cy.81))
- The Social Security (Earnings Factor) Amendment Regulations 2003 (S.I. 2003 No. 608)
- The Misuse of Drugs (Licence Fees) (Amendment) Regulations 2003 (S.I. 2003 No. 611)
- The Immigration Control (Provision of Facilities at Ports) Order 2003 (S.I. 2003 No. 612)
- The Wolverhampton Health Care National Health Service Trust (Transfer of Trust Property) Order 2003 (S.I. 2003 No. 613)
- The Doncaster and South Humber Healthcare National Health Service Trust (Transfer of Trust Property) Order 2003 (S.I. 2003 No. 614)
- The Local Health Partnerships National Health Service Trust (Transfer of Trust Property) Order 2003 (S.I. 2003 No. 615)
- The Mid Essex Hospital Services National Health Service Trust (Transfer of Trust Property) Order 2003 (S.I. 2003 No. 616)
- The Birmingham and Solihull Mental Health National Health Service Trust (Establishment) and the Northern Birmingham Mental Health National Health Service Trust and South Birmingham Mental Health National Health Service Trust (Dissolution) Order 2003 (S.I. 2003 No. 617)
- The Salisbury Health care National Health Service Trust (Transfer of Trust Property) Order 2003 (S.I. 2003 No. 618)
- The Southwark Primary Care Trust (Transfer of Trust Property) Order 2003 (S.I. 2003 No. 619)
- The Surrey and Sussex Healthcare National Health Service Trust (Transfer of Trust Property) Order 2003 (S.I. 2003 No. 620)
- The Surrey Hampshire Borders National Health Service Trust (Transfer of Trust Property) Order 2003 (S.I. 2003 No. 621)
- The University College London Hospitals National Health Service Trust (Transfer of Trust Property) Order 2003 (S.I. 2003 No. 622)
- The Winchester and Eastleigh Healthcare National Health Service Trust (Transfer of Trust Property) Order 2003 (S.I. 2003 No. 623)
- The Bath and North East Somerset Primary Care Trust (Transfer of Trust Property) Order 2003 (S.I. 2003 No. 624)
- The Medicines for Human Use and Medical Devices(Fees Amendments) Regulations 2003 (S.I. 2003 No. 625)
- The Protection of Children and Vulnerable Adults and Care Standards Tribunal (Amendment) Regulations 2003 (S.I. 2003 No. 626)
- The National Assistance (Assessment of Resources) (Amendment) (England) Regulations 2003 (S.I. 2003 No. 627)
- The National Assistance (Sums for Personal Requirements) (England) Regulations 2003 (S.I. 2003 No. 628)
- The NHS Bodies and Local Authorities Partnership Arrangements (Amendment) (England) Regulations 2003 (S.I. 2003 No. 629)
- The National Health Service (Pension Scheme, Injury Benefits and Compensation for Premature Retirement) Amendment Regulations 2003 (S.I. 2003 No. 631)
- The South Birmingham Mental Health National Health Service Trust (Transfer of Trust Property) Order 2003 (S.I. 2003 No. 632)
- The Northern Birmingham Mental Health National Health Service Trust (Transfer of Trust Property) Order 2003 (S.I. 2003 No. 633)
- The Road Traffic (Permitted Parking Area and Special Parking Area) (County of Essex) (District of Maldon) Order 2003 (S.I. 2003 No. 634)
- The Road Traffic (Permitted Parking Area and Special Parking Area) (County of Essex) (District of Basildon) Order 2003 (S.I. 2003 No. 635)
- The Motor Vehicles (Driving Licences) (Amendment) (No. 3) Regulations 2003 (S.I. 2003 No. 636)
- The Personal Injuries (Civilians) Amendment Scheme 2003 (S.I. 2003 No. 637)
- The Magistrates' Courts (Detention and Forfeiture of Cash) (Amendment) Rules 2003 (S.I. 2003 No. 638 (L. 11)])
- The Crown Court (Amendment) (No. 2) Rules 2003 (S.I. 2003 No. 639)
- The Commission Areas (Greater London) Order 2003 (S.I. 2003 No. 640)
- The Commission Areas (South Wales) Order 2003 (S.I. 2003 No. 641)
- The Criminal Defence Service (Funding) (Amendment) Order 2003 (S.I. 2003 No. 642)
- The Criminal Defence Service (Recovery of Defence Costs Orders) (Amendment) Regulations 2003 (S.I. 2003 No. 643)
- The Criminal Defence Service (General) (No. 2) (Amendment) Regulations 2003 (S.I. 2003 No. 644)
- The Family Proceedings Fees (Amendment) Order 2003 (S.I. 2003 No. 645 (L. 12)])
- The Supreme Court Fees (Amendment) Order 2003 (S.I. 2003 No. 646 (L. 13)])
- The Supreme Court (Review of Taxation in Criminal Cases) Fees (Amendment) Order 2003 (S.I. 2003 No. 647 (L. 14)])
- The County Court Fees (Amendment) Order 2003 (S.I. 2003 No. 648 (L.15)])
- The Community Legal Service (Costs) (Amendment) Regulations 2003 (S.I. 2003 No. 649)
- The Community Legal Service (Financial)(Amendment) Regulations 2003 (S.I. 2003 No. 650)
- The Community Legal Service (Funding) (Amendment) Order 2003 (S.I. 2003 No. 651)
- The Immigration and Asylum Appeals (Procedure) Rules 2003 (S.I. 2003 No. 652 (L. 16)])
- The Tax Credits (Immigration) Regulations 2003 (S.I. 2003 No. 653)
- The Tax Credits (Residence) Regulations 2003 (S.I. 2003 No. 654)
- The Private Hire Vehicles (London) (Transitional and Saving Provisions) Regulations 2003 (S.I. 2003 No. 655)
- The Workmen's Compensation (Supplementation) (Amendment) Scheme 2003 (S.I. 2003 No. 656)
- National Health Service (Optical Charges and Payments) and (General Ophthalmic Services) Amendment Regulations 2003 (S.I. 2003 No. 657)
- The Immigration (Notices) Regulations 2003 (S.I. 2003 No. 658)
- The Social Security (Maternity Allowance) (Earnings) (Amendment) Regulations 2003 (S.I. 2003 No. 659)
- The Plant Protection Products (Fees) Regulations 2003 (S.I. 2003 No. 660)
- The Pesticides (Maximum Residue Levels in Crops, Food and Feeding Stuffs) (England and Wales) (Amendment) Regulations 2003 (S.I. 2003 No. 661)
- The Local Government (Best Value) Performance Plans and Reviews (Amendment) (England and Wales) Order 2003 (S.I. 2003 No. 662)
- The Wireless Telegraphy (Television Licence Fees) (Amendment) Regulations 2003 (S.I. 2003 No. 663)
- The Awards for All (England) Joint Scheme (Authorisation) Order 2003 (S.I. 2003 No. 664)
- The Climate Change Levy (Use as Fuel) (Amendment) Regulations 2003 (S.I. 2003 No. 665)
- The Natural Mineral Water, Spring Water and Bottled Drinking Water (Amendment) (England) Regulations 2003 (S.I. 2003 No. 666)
- The National Health Service (Travelling Expenses and Remission of Charges) (Amendment) Regulations 2003 (S.I. 2003 No. 671)
- The Statutory Maternity Pay (Compensation of Employers) Amendment Regulations 2003 (S.I. 2003 No. 672)
- The Council Tax (Discount Disregards) (Amendment) (Wales) Order 2003 (S.I. 2003 No. 673 (W.83))
- Gorchymyn Treth Gyngor (Diystyru Gostyngiad) (Diwygio) (Cymru) 2003 (S.I. 2003 Rhif 673 (Cy.83))
- The Pensions Increase (Review) Order 2003 (S.I. 2003 No. 681)
- The Education Act 2002 (School Meals) (Consequential Amendments) (England) Regulations 2003 (S.I. 2003 No. 689)
- Public Trustee (Fees) (Amendment) Order 2003 (S.I. 2003 No. 690)
- The Anti-terrorism, Crime and Security Act 2001 (Continuance in force of sections 21 to 23) Order 2003 (S.I. 2003 No. 691)
- The Tax Credits (Official Error) Regulations 2003 (S.I. 2003 No. 692)
- The Financial Services and Markets Act 2000(Disclosure of Confidential Information)(Amendment) Regulations 2003 (S.I. 2003 No. 693)
- The ACAS (Flexible Working) Arbitration Scheme (England and Wales) Order 2003 (S.I. 2003 No. 694)
- The Prescription Only Medicines (Human Use) Amendment Order 2003 (S.I. 2003 No. 696)
- The Medicines (Pharmacy and General Sale—Exemption) Amendment Order 2003 (S.I. 2003 No. 697)
- The Medicines (Sale or Supply) (Miscellaneous Provisions) Amendment Regulations 2003 (S.I. 2003 No. 698)
- The National Health Service (Amendments Relating to Prescribing by Nurses and Pharmacists etc.) (England) Regulations 2003 (S.I. 2003 No. 699)
- The International Development Association (Thirteenth Replenishment) Order 2002 (S.I. 2003 No. 700)

== 701–800 ==
- The Working Tax Credit (Entitlement and Maximum Rate) (Amendment) Regulations 2003 (S.I. 2003 No. 701)
- The Welfare Food (Amendment) Regulations 2003 (S.I. 2003 No. 702)
- The Police and Criminal Evidence Act 1984 (Codes of Practice) (Codes B to E) (No. 2) Order 2003 (S.I. 2003 No. 703)
- The Police and Criminal Evidence Act 1984(Codes of Practice) (Modifications to Codes C and D)(Certain Police Areas) Order 2003 (S.I. 2003 No. 704)
- The Police and Criminal Evidence Act 1984 (Codes of Practice) (Code E) Order 2003 (S.I. 2003 No. 705)
- The Revenue Support Grant (Specified Bodies) (Amendment) (Wales) Regulations 2003 (S.I. 2003 No. 706 (W.85))
- Rheoliadau Grant Cynnal Refeniw (Cyrff Penodedig) (Diwygio) (Cymru) 2003 (S.I. 2003 Rhif 706 (Cy.85))
- The Youth Justice and Criminal Evidence Act 1999 (Commencement No. 8) Order 2003 (S.I. 2003 No. 707 (C. 33)])
- The Criminal Justice and Police Act 2001 (Commencement No. 9) Order 2003 (S.I. 2003 No. 708 (C.34)])
- The Criminal Justice and Court Services Act 2000 (Commencement No. 11) Order 2003 (S.I. 2003 No. 709 (C. 35)])
- The Local Authority Adoption Service and Miscellaneous Amendments (Wales) Regulations 2003 (S.I. 2003 No. 710 (W.86))
- Rheoliadau Gwasanaethau Mabwysiadu Awdurdodau Lleol a Diwygiadau Amrywiol (Cymru) 2003 (S.I. 2003 Rhif 710 (Cy.86))
- The District of South Cambridgeshire (Electoral Changes) (Amendment) Order 2003 (S.I. 2003 No. 711)
- The Disability Discrimination (Blind and Partially Sighted Persons) Regulations 2003 (S.I. 2003 No. 712)
- The Health and Social Care Act 2001 (Commencement No. 4) (Wales) Order 2003 (S.I. 2003 No. 713 (W.87) (C.36))
- Gorchymyn Deddf Iechyd a Gofal Cymdeithasol 2001 (Cychwyn Rhif 4) (Cymru) 2003 (S.I. 2003 Rhif 713 (Cy.87) (C.36))
- The Financial Assistance for Environmental Purposes (England) Order 2003 (S.I. 2003 No. 714)
- The Working Tax Credit (Payment by Employers) (Amendment) Regulations 2003 (S.I. 2003 No. 715)
- The Grinling Gibbons Primary School (Change to School Session Times) Order 2003 (S.I. 2003 No. 716)
- The Supreme Court Fees (Amendment No. 2) Order 2003 (S.I. 2003 No. 717 (L. 17)])
- The County Court Fees (Amendment No. 2) Order 2003 (S.I. 2003 No. 718 (L. 18)])
- The Family Proceedings Fees (Amendment No. 2) Order 2003 (S.I. 2003 No. 719 (L. 19)])
- The Court Funds (Amendment No.2) Rules 2003 (S.I. 2003 No. 720 (L. 20)])
- The Creosote (Prohibition on Use and Marketing) Regulations 2003 (S.I. 2003 No. 721)
- The Equal Pay (Questions and Replies) Order 2003 (S.I. 2003 No. 722)
- The Tax Credits (Claims and Notifications and Payments by the Board) (Amendment) Regulations 2003 (S.I. 2003 No. 723)
- The A660 Trunk Road (Burley Hall Roundabout to City Boundary) (Detrunking) Order 2003 (S.I. 2003 No. 724)
- The A65 Trunk Road (Burley Hall Roundabout to City Boundary) (Detrunking) Order 2003 (S.I. 2003 No. 725)
- The A19 Trunk Road (Rawcliffe Roundabout to City Boundary) (Detrunking) Order 2003 (S.I. 2003 No. 726)
- The A1079 Trunk Road (Grimston Bar Interchange to City Boundary) (Detrunking) Order 2003 (S.I. 2003 No. 727)
- The A19 Trunk Road (County Boundary to Fulford Interchange) (Detrunking) Order 2003 (S.I. 2003 No. 728)
- The Tax Credits (Provision of Information) (Functions Relating to Health) Regulations 2003 (S.I. 2003 No. 731)
- The Tax Credits (Definition and Calculation of Income) (Amendment) Regulations 2003 (S.I. 2003 No. 732)
- The Social Security (Categorisation of Earners) Amendment (Northern Ireland) Regulations 2003 (S.I. 2003 No. 733)
- The Social Security Contributions and Benefits (Northern Ireland) Act 1992 (Modifications for Her Majesty's Forces and Incapacity Benefit) Regulations 2003 (S.I. 2003 No. 735)
- The Social Security (Categorisation of Earners) Amendment Regulations 2003 (S.I. 2003 No. 736)
- The Social Security Contributions and Benefits Act 1992 (Modifications for Her Majesty's Forces and Incapacity Benefit) Regulations 2003 (S.I. 2003 No. 737)
- The Child Tax Credit (Amendment) Regulations 2003 (S.I. 2003 No. 738)
- The Tax Credits (Polygamous Marriages) Regulations 2003 (S.I. 2003 No. 742)
- Local Government Boundary Commission for Wales (Accounts, Audit and Reports) Order 2003 (S.I. 2003 No. 749)
- The Energy Information (Household Air Conditioners) Regulations 2003 (S.I. 2003 No. 750)
- The Energy Information (Household Electric Ovens) Regulations 2003 (S.I. 2003 No. 751)
- The Medicated Feedingstuffs (Amendment) (Scotland, England and Wales) Regulations 2003 (S.I. 2003 No. 752)
- The National Care Standards Commission (Fees and Frequency of Inspections) Regulations 2003 (S.I. 2003 No. 753)
- The Nationality, Immigration and Asylum Act 2002 (Commencement No. 4) Order 2003 (S.I. 2003 No. 754 (C. 37)])
- The Asylum Support (Amendment) (No.2) Regulations 2003 (S.I. 2003 No. 755)
- The Tribunals and Inquiries (Road User Charging Adjudicators) (London) Order 2003 (S.I. 2003 No. 756)
- The Anglian Water Parks Byelaws (Extension) Order 2003 (S.I. 2003 No. 757)
- The Immigration and Asylum Act 1999 (Commencement No.13) Order 2003 (S.I. 2003 No. 758 (C. 38)])
- The Bolton, Salford and Trafford Mental Health National Health Service Trust (Establishment) and the Mental Health Services of Salford National Health Service Trust (Dissolution) Order 2003 (S.I. 2003 No. 759)
- The Community Health Sheffield National Health Service Trust (Change of Name) and (Establishment) Amendment Order 2003 (S.I. 2003 No. 760)
- The Health and Social Care Act 2001 (Isles of Scilly) (No. 2) Order 2003 (S.I. 2003 No. 761)
- The Community Care, Services for Carers and Children's Services (Direct Payments) (England) Regulations 2003 (S.I. 2003 No. 762)
- The Enterprise Act 2002 (Commencement No. 1) Order 2003 (S.I. 2003 No. 765 (C.39)])
- The Enterprise Act 2002 (Commencement No. 2, Transitional and Transitory Provisions) Order 2003 (S.I. 2003 No. 766 (C. 40)])
- The Enterprise Act 2002 (Consequential and Transitory Provisions) Order 2003 (S.I. 2003 No. 767)
- The Council Tax (Administration and Enforcement) (Amendment) (England) Regulations 2003 (S.I. 2003 No. 768)
- The Education (School Teachers' Pay and Conditions) Order 2003 (S.I. 2003 No. 769)
- The Income-related Benefits and Jobseeker's Allowance (Working Tax Credit and Child Tax Credit) (Amendment) Regulations 2003 (S.I. 2003 No. 770)
- The Merchant Shipping (Passenger Ships on Domestic Voyages) (Amendment) Regulations 2003 (S.I. 2003 No. 771)
- The Sea Fishing (Enforcement of Community Quota and Third Country Fishing Measures) (England) Order 2003 (S.I. 2003 No. 772)
- The Performances (Reciprocal Protection) (Convention Countries and Isle of Man) Order 2003 (S.I. 2003 No. 773)
- The Copyright (Application to Other Countries) (Amendment) Order 2003 (S.I. 2003 No. 774)
- The Maximum Number of Judges Order 2003 (S.I. 2003 No. 775)
- The Reciprocal Enforcement of Maintenance Orders (United States of America) (Variation) Order 2003 (S.I. 2003 No. 776)
- The Air Navigation (Amendment) Order 2003 (S.I. 2003 No. 777)
- The Common Investment (Closure of High Yield Fund) Scheme 2003 (S.I. 2003 No. 778)
- The Waste Management Licensing (Amendment) (Wales) Regulations 2003 (S.I. 2003 No. 780 (W.91))
- Rheoliadau Trwyddedu Rheoli Gwastraff (Diwygio) (Cymru) 2003 (S.I. 2003 Rhif 780 (Cy.91))
- The Residential Family Centres (Wales) Regulations 2003 (S.I. 2003 No. 781 (W.92))
- Rheoliadau Canolfannau Preswyl i Deuluoedd (Cymru) 2003 (S.I. 2003 Rhif 781 (Cy.92))
- The National Health Service (General Dental Services) (Amendment) (Wales) Regulations 2003 (S.I. 2003 No. 782 (W.93))
- Rheoliadau'r Gwasanaeth Iechyd Gwladol (Gwasanaethau Deintyddol Cyffredinol) (Diwygio) (Cymru) 2003 (S.I. 2003 Rhif 782 (Cy.93))
- The National Health Service (Pharmaceutical Services) (Amendment) (Wales) Regulations 2003 (S.I. 2003 No. 783 (W.94))
- Rheoliadau'r Gwasanaeth Iechyd Gwladol (Gwasanaethau Fferyllol) (Diwygio) (Cymru) 2003 (S.I. 2003 Rhif 783 (Cy.94))
- The National Health Service (General Medical Services) (Amendment) (No. 2) (Wales) Regulations 2003 (S.I. 2003 No. 784 (W.95))
- Rheoliadau'r Gwasanaeth Iechyd Gwladol (Gwasanaethau Meddygol Cyffredinol) (Diwygio) (Rhif 2) (Cymru) 2003 (S.I. 2003 Rhif 784 (Cy.95))
- Air Force Act 1955 (Part 1) Regulations 2001 (Amendment) Regulations 2003 (S.I. 2003 No. 786)
- The Merchant Shipping (Fees) (Amendment) Regulations 2003 (S.I. 2003 No. 788)
- The Norfolk and Norwich Health Care National Health Service Trust (Establishment) Amendment Order 2003 (S.I. 2003 No. 791)
- The North Staffordshire Hospital National Health Service Trust (Change of Name) Order 2003 (S.I. 2003 No. 792)
- The Designation of Schools Having a Religious Character (England) Order 2003 (S.I. 2003 No. 800)

== 801–900 ==
- The Immigration and Asylum Appeals (Fast Track Procedure) Rules 2003 (S.I. 2003 No. 801 (L. 21)])
- The Housing (Right to Buy) (Limits of Discount) (Amendment) (Wales) Order 2003 (S.I. 2003 No. 803 (W.97))
- Gorchymyn Tai (Hawl i Brynu) (Terfynau'r Disgownt) (Diwygio) (Cymru) 2003 (S.I. 2003 Rhif 803 (Cy.97))
- The Police Reform Act 2002 (Commencement No.4) Order 2003 (S.I. 2003 No. 808 (C. 43)])
- The A638 Trunk Road (South of Doncaster) (Detrunking) Order 2003 (S.I. 2003 No. 809)
- The Carlisle (Parishes Order 2003 (S.I. 2003 No. 810)
- The Wyre (Parishes) Order 2003 (S.I. 2003 No. 811)
- The Products of Animal Origin (Third Country Imports) (England) (Amendment) Regulations 2003 (S.I. 2003 No. 812)
- The Health Authorities (Transfer of Functions, Staff, Property, Rights and Liabilities and Abolition) (Wales) Order 2003 (S.I. 2003 No. 813 (W.98))
- Gorchymyn Awdurdodau Iechyd (Trosglwyddo Swyddogaethau, Staff, Eiddo, Hawliau a Rhwymedigaethau a Diddymu) (Cymru) 2003 (S.I. 2003 Rhif 813 (Cy.98))
- The Health Authorities (Transfer of Functions, Staff, Property, Rights and Liabilities and Abolition) (Wales) (Amendment) Order 2003 (S.I. 2003 No. 814 (W.99))
- Gorchymyn Awdurdodau Iechyd (Trosglwyddo Swyddogaethau, Staff, Eiddo, Hawliau a Rhwymedigaethau a Diddymu) (Cymru) (Diwygio) 2003 (S.I. 2003 Rhif 814 (Cy.99))
- The Powys Local Health Board (Additional Functions) (Regulations 2003 (S.I. 2003 No. 815 (W.100))
- Rheoliadau Bwrdd Iechyd Lleol Powys (Swyddogaethau Ychwanegol) 2003 (S.I. 2003 Rhif 815 (Cy.100))
- The Local Health Boards (Functions) (Amendment) Regulations 2003 (S.I. 2003 No. 816 (W.101))
- Rheoliadau'r Byrddau Iechyd Lleol (Swyddogaethau) (Diwygio) 2003 (S.I. 2003 Rhif 816 (Cy.101))
- The Powys Health Care National Health Service Trust (Dissolution) Order 2003 (S.I. 2003 No. 817 (W.102))
- Gorchymyn Ymddiriedolaeth Gwasanaeth Iechyd Gwladol Gofal Iechyd Powys (Diddymu) 2003 (S.I. 2003 Rhif 817 (Cy.102))
- The Local Health Boards (Transfer of Staff) (Wales) Order 2003 (S.I. 2003 No. 818 (W.103))
- Gorchymyn y Byrddau Iechyd Lleol (Trosglwyddo Staff) (Cymru) 2003 (S.I. 2003 Rhif 818 (Cy.103))
- The European Convention on Cinematographic Co-production (Amendment) Order 2003 (S.I. 2003 No. 828)
- The Grants to the Churches Conservation Trust Order 2003 (S.I. 2003 No. 829)
- The Police (Revocation of Secretary of State's Objectives) Order 2003 (S.I. 2003 No. 830)
- The Food Labelling (Amendment) (Wales) Regulations 2003 (S.I. 2003 No. 832 (W.104))
- Rheoliadau Labelu Bwyd (Diwygio) (Cymru) 2003 (S.I. 2003 Rhif 832 (Cy.104))
- The National Health Service Reform and Health Care Professions Act 2002 (Commencement No. 4) Order 2003 (S.I. 2003 No. 833 (C. 45)])
- The Bradford Hospitals National Health Service Trust (Change of Name) and (Establishment) Amendment Order 2003 (S.I. 2003 No. 834)
- The Cosmetic Products (Safety) Regulations 2003 (S.I. 2003 No. 835)
- The National Health Service (General Ophthalmic Services) (Amendment) (Wales) Regulations 2003 (S.I. 2003 No. 837 (W.106))
- Rheoliadau'r Gwasanaeth Iechyd Gwladol (Gwasanaethau Offthalmig Cyffredinol) (Diwygio) (Cymru) 2003 (S.I. 2003 Rhif 837 (Cy.106))
- The Entry Level Agri-Environment Scheme (Pilot) (England) Regulations 2003 (S.I. 2003 No. 838)
- The Public Lending Right (Increase of Limit) Order 2003 (S.I. 2003 No.839)
- The Income Tax (Indexation) Order 2003 (S.I. 2003 No. 840)
- The Inheritance Tax (Indexation) Order 2003 (S.I. 2003 No. 841)
- The Capital Gains Tax (Annual Exempt Amount) Order 2003 (S.I. 2003 No. 842)
- The Retirement Benefit Schemes (Indexation of Earnings Cap) Order 2003 (S.I. 2003 No. 843)
- The Black Country Mental Health National Health Service Trust (Change of Name) and (Establishment) Amendment Order 2003 (S.I. 2003 No. 844)
- The Offshore Installations (Safety Zones) Order 2003 (S.I. 2003 No.845)
- The Gas (Applications for Licences and Extensions and Restrictions of Licences)(Amendment) Regulations 2003 (S.I. 2003 No. 847)
- The Electricity (Applications for Licences and Extensions and Restrictions of Licences)(Amendment) Regulations 2003 (S.I. 2003 No. 848)
- The Financial Assistance For Industry (Increase of Limit) Order 2003 (S.I. 2003 No. 849)
- The Health and Social Care Act 2001 (Commencement No. 12) (England) Order 2003 (S.I. 2003 No. 850 (C. 46)])
- The Community Legal Service (Funding) (Amendment No. 2) Order 2003 (S.I. 2003 No. 851)
- The Road Traffic Act 1991 (Special Parking Areas) (England) Order 2003 (S.I. 2003 No. 859)
- The Education (Remission of Charges Relating to Residential Trips) (Wales) Regulations 2003 (S.I. 2003 No. 860 (W.107))
- Rheoliadau Addysg (Peidio â Chodi Tâl sy'n Ymwneud â Theithiau Preswyl) (Cymru) 2003 (S.I. 2003 Rhif 860 (Cy.107))
- The Climate Change Levy (Combined Heat and Power Stations) Prescribed Conditions and Efficiency Percentages (Amendment) Regulations 2003 (S.I. 2003 No. 861)
- The Value Added Tax (Place of Supply of Services) (Amendment) Order 2003 (S.I. 2003 No. 862)
- The Value Added Tax (Reverse Charge) (Amendment) Order 2003 (S.I. 2003 No. 863)
- The Local Government (Best Value) Performance Indicators and Performance Standards (Amendment) (England) Order 2003 (S.I. 2003 No. 864)
- The Brighton Health Care National Health Service Trust (Change of Name) Order 2003 (S.I. 2003 No. 866)
- The National Health Service Trusts (Dissolutions) Order 2003 (S.I. 2003 No. 868)
- The Public Records Office (Fees) Regulations 2003 (S.I. 2003 No. 871)
- The Education (Outturn Statements) (Wales) Regulations 2003 (S.I. 2003 No. 873 (W.109))
- Rheoliadau Addysg (Datganiadau Alldro) (Cymru) 2003 (S.I. 2003 Rhif 873 (Cy.109))
- The Education (Free School Lunches) (Prescribed Tax Credits) (Wales) Order 2003 (S.I. 2003 No. 879 (W.110))
- Gorchymyn Addysg (Ciniawau Ysgol Rhad ac am Ddim) (Credydau Treth Rhagnodedig) (Cymru) 2003 (S.I. 2003 Rhif 879 (Cy.110))
- The Education (School Lunches) (Prescribed Requirement) (Wales) Order 2003 (S.I. 2003 No. 880 (W.111))
- Gorchymyn Addysg (Ciniawau Ysgol) (Gofyniad Rhagnodedig) (Cymru) 2003 (S.I. 2003 Rhif 880 (Cy.111))
- The National Assistance (Sums for Personal Requirements) (Wales) Regulations 2003 (S.I. 2003 No. 892 (W.112))
- Rheoliadau Cymorth Gwladol (Symiau at Anghenion Personol) (Cymru) 2003 (S.I. 2003 Rhif 892 (Cy.112))
- The Education (Nursery Education and Early Years Development and Childcare Plans) (Wales) Regulations 2003 (S.I. 2003 No. 893 (W.113))
- Rheoliadau Addysg (Addysg Feithrin a Chynlluniau Datblygu Blynyddoedd Cynnar a Gofal Plant) (Cymru) 2003 (S.I. 2003 Rhif 893 (Cy.113))
- The Local Authorities (Capital Finance) (Rate of Discount for 2003/2004) (Wales) Regulations 2003 (S.I. 2003 No. 894 (W.114))
- Rheoliadau Awdurdodau Lleol (Cyllid Cyfalaf) (Cyfradd y Disgownt ar gyfer 2003/2004) (Cymru) 2003 (S.I. 2003 Rhif 894 (Cy.114))
- The Local Authorities (Allowances for Members of Community Councils) (Wales) Regulations 2003 (S.I. 2003 No. 895 (W.115))
- Rheoliadau Awdurdodau Lleol (Lwfansau i Aelodau Cynghorau Cymuned) (Cymru) 2003 (S.I. 2003 Rhif 895 (Cy.115))
- The Fostering Services (Wales) (Amendment) Regulations 2003 (S.I. 2003 No. 896 (W.116))
- Rheoliadau Gwasanaethau Maethu (Cymru) (Diwygio) 2003 (S.I. 2003 Rhif 896 (Cy.116))
- The National Assistance (Assessment of Resources) (Amendment) (Wales) Regulations 2003 (S.I. 2003 No. 897 (W.117))
- Rheoliadau Cymorth Gwladol (Asesu Adnoddau) (Diwygio) (Cymru) 2003 (S.I. 2003 Rhif 897 (Cy.117))
- The Road Traffic (Permitted Parking Area and Special Parking Area) (Borough of Slough) Order 2003 (S.I. 2003 No. 898)

== 901–1000 ==
- The Local Authorities (Charges for Specified Welfare Services) (England) Regulations 2003 (S.I. 2003 No. 907)
- The Horticultural Development Council (Amendment) Order 2003 (S.I. 2003 No. 908)
- The Apple and Pear Research Council (Dissolution) Order 2003 (S.I. 2003 No. 909)
- The M62 Motorway (Rawcliffe to Balkholme Section) Connecting Roads Scheme 1971 (Variation) Scheme 2003 (S.I. 2003 No. 913)
- The National Health Service Trusts (Originating Capital) Order 2003 (S.I. 2003 No. 914)
- The Local Authorities (Capital Finance) (Amendment) (Wales) Regulations 2003 (S.I. 2003 No. 915 (W.118))
- Rheoliadau Awdurdodau Lleol (Cyllid Cyfalaf) (Diwygio) (Cymru) 2003 (S.I. 2003 Rhif 915 (Cy.118))
- The Child Benefit and Guardian's Allowance (Decisions and Appeals) Regulations 2003 (S.I. 2003 No. 916)
- The Prosecution of Offences (Youth Courts Time Limits) (Revocation and Transitional Provision) Regulations 2003 (S.I. 2003 No. 917)
- The Individual Learning Accounts Wales Regulations 2003 (S.I. 2003 No. 918 (W.119))
- Rheoliadau Cyfrifon Dysgu Unigol Cymru 2003 (S.I. 2003 Rhif 918 (Cy.119))
- The Employment Rights Act 1996 (Application of Section 80B to Adoptions from Overseas) Regulations 2003 (S.I. 2003 No. 920)
- The Paternity and Adoption Leave (Adoption from Overseas) Regulations 2003 (S.I. 2003 No. 921)
- The National Assistance (Residential Accommodation)(Additional Payments, Relevant Contributions and Assessment of Resources)(Wales) Regulations 2003 (S.I. 2003 No. 931 (W.121))
- Rheoliadau Cymorth Gwladol (Llety Preswyl) (Taliadau Ychwanegol, Cyfraniadau Perthnasol ac Asesu Adnoddau) (Cymru) 2003 (S.I. 2003 Rhif 931 (Cy.121))
- The Basic Curriculum for Wales (Amendment) Order 2003 (S.I. 2003 No. 932 (W.122))
- Gorchymyn y Cwricwlwm Sylfaenol ar gyfer Cymru (Diwygio) 2003 (S.I. 2003 Rhif 932 (W.122))
- The Care Standards Act 2000 (Commencement No.18) (England) Order 2003 (S.I. 2003 No. 933 (C. 47)])
- The Criminal Justice and Police Act 2001 (Powers of Seizure) Order 2003 (S.I. 2003 No. 934)
- The Land Registration Act 2002 (Commencement No. 1) Order 2003 (S.I. 2003 No. 935 (C. 48)])
- The Welfare Reform and Pensions Act 1999 (Commencement No. 16) Order 2003 (S.I. 2003 No. 936 (C. 49)])
- The Social Security (Working Tax Credit and Child Tax Credit) (Consequential Amendments) (No. 2) Regulations 2003 (S.I. 2003 No. 937)
- The Tax Credits Act 2002 (Commencement No. 3 and Transitional Provisions and Savings) Order 2003 (S.I. 2003 No. 938)
- The Health and Social Care Act 2001 (Commencement No. 5) (Wales) Order 2003 (S.I. 2003 No. 939 (W.123) (C.50))
- Gorchymyn Deddf Iechyd a Gofal Cymdeithasol 2001 (Cychwyn Rhif 5) (Cymru) 2003 (S.I. 2003 Rhif 939 (Cy.123) (C.50))
- The Regulatory Reform (Housing Management Agreements) Order 2003 (S.I. 2003 No. 940)
- The Vehicle and Operator Services Agency Trading Fund Order 2003 (S.I. 2003 No. 942)
- The Bus Service Operators Grant (Amendment) (Wales) Regulations 2003 (S.I. 2003 No. 943 (W.124))
- Rheoliadau Grant Gweithredwyr Gwasanaethau Bysiau (Diwygio) (Cymru) 2003 (S.I. 2003 Rhif 943 (Cy.124))
- The Non-Domestic Rating (Utilities) (Rateable Value) (Amendment) (Wales) Order 2003 (S.I. 2003 No. 944 (W.125))
- Gorchymyn Ardrethu Annomestig (Cyfleustodau) (Gwerth Ardrethol) (Diwygio) (Cymru) 2003 (S.I. 2003 Rhif 944 (Cy.125))
- The Miscellaneous Food Additives (Amendment) (Wales) Regulations 2003 (S.I. 2003 No. 945 (W.126))
- Rheoliadau Ychwanegion Bwyd Amrywiol (Diwygio) (Cymru) 2003 (S.I. 2003 Rhif 945 (Cy.126))
- The Sheep and Goats Identification and Movement (Interim Measures) (Wales) (No.2) (Amendment) (No.2) Order 2003 (S.I. 2003 No. 946 (W.127))
- Gorchymyn Adnabod a Symud Defaid a Geifr (Mesurau Dros Dro) (Cymru) (Rhif 2) (Diwygio) (Rhif 2) 2003 (S.I. 2003 Rhif 946 (Cy.127))
- The Care Homes (Amendment) (Wales) Regulations 2003 (S.I. 2003 No. 947 (W.128))
- Rheoliadau Cartrefi Gofal (Diwygio) (Cymru) 2003 (S.I. 2003 Rhif 947 (Cy.128))
- The Pollution Prevention and Control (Designation of Council Directive on Solvent Emissions) Order 2003 (S.I. 2003 No. 948)
- The Town and Country Planning (Electronic Communications) (England) Order 2003 (S.I. 2003 No. 956)
- The Tax Credits Act 2002 (Commencement No. 4, Transitional Provisions and Savings) Order 2003 (S.I. 2003 No. 962 (C. 51)])
- The Social Security (Contributions) (Re-rating and National Insurance Funds Payments) Order 2003 (S.I. 2003 No. 963)
- The Social Security (Contributions) (Amendment No. 2) Regulations 2003 (S.I. 2003 No. 964)
- The Rehabilitation of Offenders Act 1974 (Exceptions) (Amendment) (England and Wales) Order 2003 (S.I. 2003 No. 965)
- The State Pension Credit Act 2002 (Commencement No. 4) Order 2003 (S.I. 2003 No. 966 (C.52 )])
- The Special Commissioners (Jurisdiction and Procedure) (Amendment) Regulations 2003 (S.I. 2003 No. 968)
- The National Assistance (Residential Accommodation) (Disregarding of Resources) (Wales) Regulations 2003 (S.I. 2003 No. 969 (W.131))
- Rheoliadau Cymorth Gwladol (Llety Preswyl) (Diystyru Adnoddau) (Cymru) 2003 (S.I. 2003 Rhif 969 (Cy.131))
- The Asylum (Designated States) Order 2003 (S.I. 2003 No. 970)
- The European Parliamentary Election Petition (Amendment) Rules 2003 (S.I. 2003 No. 971 (L. 22)])
- The Election Petition (Amendment) Rules 2003 (S.I. 2003 No. 972 (L. 23)])
- The Administration of the Rent Officer Service (Wales) Order 2003 (S.I. 2003 No. 973 (W.132))
- Gorchymyn Gweinyddu Gwasanaeth y Swyddogion Rhenti (Cymru) 2003 (S.I. 2003 Rhif 973 (Cy.132))
- The Preserved Counties (Amendment to Boundaries) (Wales) Order 2003 (S.I. 2003 No. 974 (W.133))
- Gorchymyn Siroedd Wedi'u Cadw (Newid Ffiniau) (Cymru) 2003 (S.I. 2003 Rhif 974 (Cy.133))
- The National Health Service (Travelling Expenses and Remission of Charges) (Amendment) (Wales) Regulations 2003 (S.I. 2003 No. 975 (W.134))
- Rheoliadau'r Gwasanaeth Iechyd Gwladol (Treuliau Teithio a Pheidio â Chodi Tâl) (Diwygio) (Cymru) 2003 (S.I. 2003 Rhif 975 (Cy.134))
- The Products of Animal Origin (Third Country Imports) (Wales) (Amendment) Regulations 2003 (S.I. 2003 No. 976 (W.135))
- Rheoliadau Cynhyrchion sy'n Deillio o Anifeiliaid (Mewnforion Trydydd Gwledydd) (Cymru) (Diwygio) 2003 (S.I. 2003 Rhif 976 (Cy.135))
- The Control of Substances Hazardous to Health (Amendment) Regulations 2003 (S.I. 2003 No. 978)
- The Government Resources and Accounts Act 2000 (Summarised Accounts of Special Health Authorities) Order 2003 (S.I. 2003 No. 983)
- The District of Adur (Scheme for Elections of Specified Council) Order 2003 (S.I. 2003 No. 984)
- General Teaching Council for England (Deduction of Fees) (Amendment) Regulations 2003 (S.I. 2003 No. 985)
- The Regulatory Reform (Schemes under Section 129 of the Housing Act 1988) (England) Order 2003 (S.I. 2003 No. 986)
- The Feeding Stuffs (Amendment) (Wales) Regulations 2003 (S.I. 2003 No. 989 (W.138))
- Rheoliadau Porthiant (Diwygio) (Cymru) 2003 (S.I. 2003 Rhif 989 (Cy.138))
- The Leasehold Reform (Collective Enfranchisement) (Counter-notices) (Wales) Regulations 2003 (S.I. 2003 No. 990 (W.139))
- Rheoliadau Diwygio Lesddaliad (Rhyddfreinio ar y Cyd) (Gwrth-hysbysiadau) (Cymru) 2003 (S.I. 2003 Rhif 990 (Cy.139))
- The Leasehold Reform (Notices) (Amendment) (Wales) Regulations 2003 (S.I. 2003 No. 991 (W.140))
- Rheoliadau Diwygio Lesddaliad (Hysbysiadau) (Diwygio) (Cymru) 2003 (S.I. 2003 Rhif 991 (Cy.140))
- The Zoo Licensing Act 1981 (Amendment) (Wales) Regulations 2003 (S.I. 2003 No. 992 (W.141))
- Rheoliadau Deddf Trwyddedu Sŵau 1981 (Diwygio) (Cymru) 2003 (S.I. 2003 Rhif 992 (Cy.141))
- Commission For Health Improvement (Functions) (Wales) Regulations 2003 (S.I. 2003 No. 993 (W.142))
- Rheoliadau'r Comisiwn Gwella Iechyd (Swyddogaethau) (Cymru) 2003 (S.I. 2003 Rhif 993 (Cy.142))
- The Commons Registration (General) (Amendment) (Wales) Regulations 2003 (S.I. 2003 No. 994 (W.143))
- Rheoliadau Cofrestru Tir Comin (Cyffredinol) (Diwygio) (Cymru) 2003 (S.I. 2003 Rhif 994 (Cy.143))

== 1001–1100 ==
- The Care Homes (Wales) (Amendment No.2) Regulations 2003 (S.I. 2003 No. 1004 (W.144))
- Rheoliadau Cartrefi Gofal (Cymru) (Diwygio Rhif 2) 2003 (S.I. 2003 Rhif 1004 (Cy.144))
- The National Health Service (General Medical Services) (Amendment) (No.3) (Wales) Regulations 2003 (S.I. 2003 No. 1005 (W.145))
- Rheoliadau'r Gwasanaeth Iechyd Gwladol (Gwasanaethau Meddygol Cyffredinol) (Diwygio) (Rhif 3) (Cymru) 2003 (S.I. 2003 Rhif 1005 (Cy.145))
- Education (Pupil Information) (England) (Amendment) Regulations 2003 (S.I. 2003 No. 1006)
- The A339 Trunk Road (West Berkshire/Hampshire County Boundary at Knights Bridge, near Bishops Green to south of the A30 Blackdam Roundabout)(Detrunking) Order 2003 (S.I. 2003 No. 1007)
- The Miscellaneous Food Additives (Amendment) (England) Regulations 2003 (S.I. 2003 No. 1008)
- The Nationality, Immigration and Asylum Act 2002 (Consequential and Incidental Provisions) Order 2003 (S.I. 2003 No. 1016)
- The Home Energy Efficiency Scheme (England) (Amendment) Regulations 2003 (S.I. 2003 No. 1017)
- The Local Authorities (Goods and Services) (Public Bodies) (England) (No. 2) Order 2003 (S.I. 2003 No. 1018)
- The Motor Vehicles (EC Type Approval) (Amendment) Regulations 2003 (S.I. 2003 No. 1019)
- The Local Authorities (Members' Allowances) (England) Regulations 2003 (S.I. 2003 No. 1021)
- The Local Government Pension Scheme and Discretionary Compensation (Local Authority Members in England) Regulations 2003 (S.I. 2003 No. 1022)
- The Feeding Stuffs (Amendment) Regulations 2003 (S.I. 2003 No. 1026)
- The Common Investment (Closure of High Yield Fund) (Amendment) Scheme 2003 (S.I. 2003 No. 1027)
- The Land Registration Act 2002 (Commencement No. 2) Order 2003 (S.I. 2003 No. 1028 (C. 53)])
- The Town and Country Planning (Prescription of County Matters) (England) Regulations 2003 (S.I. 2003 No. 1033)
- The Special Immigration Appeals Commission (Procedure) Rules 2003 (S.I. 2003 No. 1034)
- The Public Airport Companies (Capital Finance) (Amendment) Order 2003 (S.I. 2003 No. 1035)
- The Bus Service Operators Grant (Amendment) (England) Regulations 2003 (S.I. 2003 No. 1036)
- The Education (National Curriculum) (Key Stage 1 Assessment Arrangements) (England) Order 2003 (S.I. 2003 No. 1037)
- The Education (National Curriculum) (Key Stage 2 Assessment Arrangements) (England) Order 2003 (S.I. 2003 No. 1038)
- The Education (National Curriculum) (Key Stage 3 Assessment Arrangements) (England) Order 2003 (S.I. 2003 No. 1039)
- The Nationality, Immigration and Asylum Act 2002 (Commencement No. 4) (Amendment of Transitional Provisions) Order 2003 (S.I. 2003 No. 1040 (C. 54)])
- The New School (Admissions) (England) Regulations 2003 (S.I. 2003 No. 1041)
- The Social Security and Child Support (Miscellaneous Amendments) Regulations 2003 (S.I. 2003 No. 1050)
- The Fee for Initial Assessment of Active Substances for Pesticides Regulations 2003 (S.I. 2003 No. 1052)
- The Surface Waters (Fishlife) (Classification) (Amendment) Regulations 2003 (S.I. 2003 No. 1053)
- The Value Added Tax (Supply of Services) (Amendment) Order 2003 (S.I. 2003 No. 1055)
- The Stamp Duty (Disadvantaged Areas) (Application of Exemptions) Regulations 2003 (S.I. 2003 No. 1056)
- The Value Added Tax (Consideration for Fuel Provided for Private Use) Order 2003 (S.I. 2003 No. 1057)
- The Value Added Tax (Increase of Registration Limits) Order 2003 (S.I. 2003 No. 1058)
- The Social Security (Contributions) (Amendment No. 3) Regulations 2003 (S.I. 2003 No. 1059)
- The Protection of Children and Vulnerable Adults and Care Standards Tribunal (Amendment No. 2) Regulations 2003 (S.I. 2003 No. 1060)
- The A14/U3124 Trimley Entry Slip Road (Levington Link Road) Trunking Order 2003 (S.I. 2003 No. 1061)
- The East Sussex Hospitals National Health Service Trust (Establishment) and the Eastbourne Hospitals National Health Service Trust and Hastings and Rother National Health Service Trust (Dissolution) Amendment Order 2003 (S.I. 2003 No. 1063)
- The Redbridge Primary Care Trust (Establishment)Order 2003 (S.I. 2003 No. 1064)
- The Education (Student Support) (No. 2) Regulations 2002 (Amendment) Regulations 2003 (S.I. 2003 No. 1065)
- The Primary Care Trusts (Dissolutions) Order 2003 (S.I. 2003 No. 1066)
- The Waltham Forest Primary Care Trust (Establishment) Order 2003 (S.I. 2003 No. 1067)
- The Social Security (Incapacity Benefit) (Her Majesty's Forces) (Amendment) Regulations 2003 (S.I. 2003 No. 1068)
- The Value Added Tax (Amendment) (No. 2) Regulations 2003 (S.I. 2003 No. 1069)
- The Superannuation (Admission to Schedule 1 to the Superannuation Act 1972) Order 2003 (S.I. 2003 No. 1073)
- The General Medical Council (Registration (Fees) (Amendment) Regulations) Order of Council 2003 (S.I. 2003 No. 1074)
- The Network Rail (West Coast Main Line) Order 2003 (S.I. 2003 No. 1075)
- The Medicines and Healthcare Products Regulatory Agency Trading Fund Order 2003 (S.I. 2003 No. 1076)
- The National Patient Safety Agency (Establishment and Constitution) Amendment Order 2003 (S.I. 2003 No. 1077)
- Diseases of Poultry (England) Order 2003 (S.I. 2003 No. 1078)
- The Diseases of Poultry (Wales) Order 2003 (S.I. 2003 No. 1079 (W.148))
- Gorchymyn Clefydau Dofednod (Cymru) 2003 (S.I. 2003 Rhif 1079 (Cy.148))
- The General Optical Council (Registration and Enrolment (Amendment) Rules) Order of Council 2003 (S.I. 2003 No. 1080)
- The General Dental Council (Constitution of Committees) Order of Council 2003 (S.I. 2003 No. 1081)
- The Ammonium Nitrate Materials (High Nitrogen Content) Safety Regulations 2003 (S.I. 2003 No. 1082)
- The Housing (Right to Buy) (Priority of Charges) (England) Order 2003 (S.I. 2003 No. 1083)
- The National Health Service (Pharmaceutical Services) (General Medical Services) and (Charges for Drugs and Appliances) Amendment Regulations 2003 (S.I. 2003 No. 1084)
- The Premium Savings Bonds (Amendment)Regulations 2003 (S.I. 2003 No. 1085)
- The Borough of Hartlepool (Electoral Changes) Order 2003 (S.I. 2003 No.1088)
- The Borough of Warrington (Electoral Changes) (Amendment) Order 2003 (S.I. 2003 No. 1089)
- The Borough of Weymouth and Portland (Electoral Changes) (Amendment) Order 2003 (S.I. 2003 No. 1090)
- The Borough of Thurrock (Electoral Changes) (Amendment) Order 2003 (S.I. 2003 No.1091)
- The Financial Services and Markets Act 2000 (Disclosure of Confidential Information) (Amendment) Regulations 2003 (S.I. 2003 No. 1092)
- Oxford Radcliffe Hospitals National Health Service Trust (Trust Funds: Appointment of Trustees) Order 2003 (S.I. 2003 No. 1093)
- The Department of Transport (Fees) (Amendment) Order 2003 (S.I. 2003 No. 1094)
- The Road Traffic (Vehicle Testing) Act 1999 (Commencement No. 2) Order 2003 (S.I. 2003 No. 1095 (C. 55)])
- The Oxford Radcliffe Hospitals National Health Service Trust (Transfer of Trust Property) Order 2003 (S.I. 2003 No. 1096)
- The Motor Cycles Etc. (EC Type Approval) (Amendment) Regulations 2003 (S.I. 2003 No. 1099)
- The Terrorism Act 2000 (Code of Practice on Video Recording of Interviews) (Northern Ireland) Order 2003 (S.I. 2003 No. 1100)

== 1101–1200 ==
- The Pedal Bicycles (Safety) Regulations 2003 (S.I. 2003 No. 1101)
- The Insurers (Reorganisation and Winding Up) Regulations 2003 (S.I. 2003 No. 1102)
- The Housing (Right to Buy) (Designated Rural Areas and Designated Region) (England) Order 2003 (S.I. 2003 No. 1105)
- The Fishing Vessels (EC Directive on Harmonised Safety Regime) (Amendment) Regulations 2003 (S.I. 2003 No. 1112)
- The Motor Vehicles (Tests) (Amendment) Regulations 2003 (S.I. 2003 No. 1113)
- The Value Added Tax (Amendment) (No. 3) Regulations 2003 (S.I. 2003 No. 1114)
- The Education Act 2002 (Commencement No.5 and Transitional and Saving Provisions) Order 2003 (S.I. 2003 No.1115 (C.56)])
- The Companies (Acquisition of Own Shares)(Treasury Shares) Regulations 2003 (S.I. 2003 No. 1116)
- The Road Transport (International Passenger Services) (Amendment) Regulations 2003 (S.I. 2003 No. 1118)
- The Food (Pistachios from Iran) (Emergency Control) (Wales) Regulations 2003 (S.I. 2003 No. 1119 (W.150))
- Rheoliadau Bwyd (Cnau Pistasio o Iran) (Rheolaeth Frys) (Cymru) 2003 (S.I. 2003 Rhif 1119 (Cy.150))
- The A45 Trunk Road (A45/A46 Stonebridge Highway Island, Coventry to the A45/A452 Stonebridge Island) (Detrunking) Order 2003 (S.I. 2003 No. 1120)
- The Social Security (Removal of Residential Allowance and Miscellaneous Amendments) Regulations 2003 (S.I. 2003 No.1121)
- The A6514 Trunk Road (A52 to A60)(Detrunking) Order 2003 (S.I. 2003 No. 1122)
- The A60 Trunk Road (Woodthorpe Drive, Sherwood to Leapool) (Detrunking) Order 2003 (S.I. 2003 No. 1123)
- The A34 Trunk Road (A34/A500 Talke Roundabout, Staffordshire to the A5011 Linley Road, Staffordshire) (Detrunking) Order 2003 (S.I. 2003 No. 1124)
- The A614 Trunk Road (Ollerton to Apleyhead) (Detrunking) Order 2003 (S.I. 2003 No. 1139)
- The A405 North Orbital Trunk Road (A41 North Western Avenue to M1 Junction 6) (Detrunking) Order 2003 (S.I. 2003 No. 1140)
- The A41 Trunk Road (Two Waters) (Detrunking) Order 2003 (S.I. 2003 No. 1141)
- The A41 London to Birkenhead Trunk Road (Hertfordshire) (Detrunking) Order 2003 (S.I. 2003 No. 1142)
- The A1001 Trunk Road (A1(M) Junction 2 to Junction 4) (Detrunking) Order 2003 (S.I. 2003 No. 1143)
- The A414 North Orbital Trunk Road (M10/A414 Park Street Roundabout to A1(M) Junction 3) (Detrunking) Order 2003 (S.I. 2003 No. 1144)
- The A405 North Orbital Trunk Road (M25 Junction 21A to M10/A414 Park Street Roundabout (Detrunking) Order 2003 (S.I. 2003 No. 1145)
- The Housing (Right to Acquire and Right to Buy) (Designated Rural Areas and Designated Regions) (Amendment) (Wales) Order 2003 (S.I. 2003 No. 1147 (W.155))
- Gorchymyn Tai (Hawl i Gaffael a Hawl i Brynu) (Ardaloedd Gwledig Dynodedig a Rhanbarthau Dynodedig) (Diwygio) (Cymru) 2003 (S.I. 2003 Rhif 1147 (Cy.155))
- The Education (Outturn Statements) (England) Regulations 2003 (S.I. 2003 No. 1153)
- The Northern Ireland Act 2000 (Modification) Order 2003 (S.I. 2003 No. 1155)
- The Representation of the People (Northern Ireland) (Variation of Specified Documents) Regulations 2003 (S.I. 2003 No. 1156)
- The Plant Health (Amendment) (England) Order 2003 (S.I. 2003 No. 1157)
- The A420 Trunk Road (Botley Roundabout Oxford to the Oxfordshire County/Swindon Unitary Authority Boundary) (Detrunking) Order 2003 (S.I. 2003 No. 1158)
- The A40 Trunk Road (Wolvercote Roundabout Oxford to the Oxfordshire/Gloucestershire County Boundary) (Detrunking) Order 2003 (S.I. 2003 No. 1159)
- The A420 Trunk Road (Merlin Way Roundabout Swindon to the Swindon Unitary Authority/Oxfordshire County Boundary) (Detrunking) Order 2003 (S.I. 2003 No. 1160)
- Adoption (Bringing Children into the United Kingdom) Regulations 2003 (S.I. 2003 No. 1173)
- The Town and Country Planning (Costs of Inquiries etc.)(Examination in Public) (England) Regulations 2003 (S.I. 2003 No. 1179)
- The Electricity and Gas (Energy Efficiency Obligations) (Amendment) Order 2003 (S.I. 2003 No. 1180)
- The Financial Services and Markets Act 2000 (Collective Investment Schemes) (Designated Countries and Territories) Order 2003 (S.I. 2003 No. 1181)
- The Sweeteners in Food (Amendment) (England) Regulations 2003 (S.I. 2003 No. 1182)
- The Carers and Disabled Children Act 2000 (Commencement No. 2) (England) Order 2003 (S.I. 2003 No. 1183 (C. 57)])
- Education (Prohibition from Teaching or Working with Children) Regulations 2003 (S.I. 2003 No. 1184)
- The Immigration (Passenger Transit Visa) Order 2003 (S.I. 2003 No. 1185)
- The General Teaching Council for England (Disciplinary Functions) (Amendment) Regulations 2003 (S.I. 2003 No. 1186)
- The Social Security and Child Support (Miscellaneous Amendments) (No. 2) Regulations 2003 (S.I. 2003 No. 1189)
- The Employment Act 2002 (Commencement No. 4 and Transitional Provisions) Order 2003 (S.I. 2003 No. 1190 (C. 58)])
- The Employment Protection Code of Practice (Time Off) Order 2003 (S.I. 2003 No. 1191)
- The Statutory Paternity Pay (Adoption) and Statutory Adoption Pay (Adoptions from Overseas) (Administration) Regulations 2003 (S.I. 2003 No. 1192)
- The Statutory Paternity Pay (Adoption) and Statutory Adoption Pay (Adoptions from Overseas)(Persons Abroad and Mariners) Regulations 2003 (S.I. 2003 No. 1193)
- The Statutory Paternity Pay (Adoption) and Statutory Adoption Pay (Adoptions from Overseas) (No. 2) Regulation 2003 (S.I. 2003 No. 1194)
- The Social Security (Hospital In-Patients and Miscellaneous Amendments) Regulations 2003 (S.I. 2003 No. 1195)
- The Community Care (Delayed Discharges etc.) Act (Qualifying Services) (England) Regulations 2003 (S.I. 2003 No. 1196)
- The A339 Trunk Road (B4640 Swan Roundabout to West Berkshire/Hampshire County Boundary) (Detrunking) Order 2003 (S.I. 2003 No. 1199)
- The Education (Additional Secondary School Proposals) Regulations 2003 (S.I. 2003 No. 1200)

== 1201–1300 ==
- The Education (School Organisation Plans) (England) (Amendment) Regulations 2003 (S.I. 2003 No.1201)
- The A339 Trunk Road (B4640 County Boundary (R. Enborne) to A339 Swan Roundabout and A339 Swan Roundabout to A34/A339 Junction) (Detrunking) Order 2003 (S.I. 2003 No. 1204)
- The Health Professions Council (Practice Committees) (Constitution) Rules Order of Council 2003 (S.I. 2003 No. 1209)
- The Carers and Disabled Children (Vouchers) (England) Regulations 2003 (S.I. 2003 No. 1216)
- The Education (School Organisation Proposals) (England) (Amendment) Regulations 2003 (S.I. 2003 No. 1229)
- The Pilotage (Recognition of Qualifications and Experience) Regulations 2003 (S.I. 2003 No. 1230)
- The Organic Farming (England Rural Development Programme) Regulations 2003 (S.I. 2003 No. 1235)
- The Magistrates' Courts (Miscellaneous Amendments) Rules 2003 (S.I. 2003 No. 1236 (L. 24)])
- The Marriages Validity (Harrogate District Hospital) Order 2003 (S.I. 2003 No. 1237)
- The Bathing Waters (Classification) (England) Regulations 2003 (S.I. 2003 No. 1238)
- The Non-Contentious Probate Fees (Amendment)Order 2003 (S.I. 2003 No. 1239 (L.25)])
- The Conditional Fee Agreements (Miscellaneous Amendments) Regulations 2003 (S.I. 2003 No. 1240)
- The Access to Justice Act 1999 (Commencement No. 10) Order 2003 (S.I. 2003 No. 1241 (C.59)])
- The Civil Procedure (Amendment No. 2) Rules 2003 (S.I. 2003 No. 1242 (L.26)])
- The Misuse of Drugs Act 1971 (Modification) Order 2003 (S.I. 2003 No. 1243)
- The Extradition (Safety of Maritime Navigation) (Amendment) Order 2003 (S.I. 2003 No. 1244)
- The Local Elections (Northern Ireland) (Amendment) Order 2003 (S.I. 2003 No. 1245)
- The European Communities (Designation) (No. 2) Order 2003 (S.I. 2003 No. 1246)
- The Criminal Justice (Northern Ireland) Order 2003 (S.I. 2003 No. 1247 (N.I. 13)])
- The Merchant Shipping (Categorisation of Registries of Relevant British Possessions) Order 2003 (S.I. 2003 No. 1248)
- The Patents Act 1977 (Isle of Man) Order 2003 (S.I. 2003 No. 1249)
- The General and Specialist Medical Practice (Education, Training and Qualifications) Order 2003 (S.I. 2003 No. 1250)
- The Extradition (Torture) (Amendment) Order 2003 (S.I. 2003 No. 1251)
- The Immigration and Asylum Act 1999 (Jersey) Order 2003 (S.I. 2003 No. 1252)
- The Fixed Penalty Offences Order 2003 (S.I. 2003 No. 1253)
- The Fixed Penalty (Amendment) Order 2003 (S.I. 2003 No. 1254)
- The Registration of Foreign Adoptions Regulations 2003 (S.I. 2003 No. 1255)
- The Safety of Sports Grounds (Designation) Order 2003 (S.I. 2003 No. 1256)
- The Road Traffic (Permitted Parking Area and Special Parking Area) (Borough of Redcar and Cleveland) Order 2003 (S.I. 2003 No. 1261)
- The Road Traffic (Permitted Parking Area and Special Parking Area) (County of Buckinghamshire)(District of Aylesbury Vale) Order 2003 (S.I. 2003 No. 1262)
- The Police Authorities (Best Value) Performance Indicators (Amendment) Order 2003 (S.I. 2003 No. 1265)
- The Town and Country Planning (Inquiries Procedure) (Wales) Rules 2003 (S.I. 2003 No. 1266)
- The Town and Country Planning Appeals (Determination by Inspectors) (Inquiries Procedure) (Wales) Rules 2003 (S.I. 2003 No. 1267)
- The Town and Country Planning (Enforcement) (Hearings Procedure) (Wales) Rules 2003 (S.I. 2003 No. 1268)
- The Town and Country Planning (Enforcement) (Inquiries Procedure) (Wales) Rules 2003 (S.I. 2003 No. 1269)
- The Town and Country Planning (Enforcement) (Determination by Inspectors) (Inquiries Procedure) (Wales) Rules 2003 (S.I. 2003 No. 1270)
- The Town and Country Planning (Hearings Procedure) (Wales) Rules 2003 (S.I. 2003 No. 1271)
- The York Health Services National Health Service Trust (Change of Name) and (Establishment) Amendment Order 2003 (S.I. 2003 No. 1276)
- The Immigration Employment Document (Fees) (Amendment) Regulations 2003 (S.I. 2003 No. 1277)
- Disease Control (Interim Measures) (England) (No. 2) Order 2003 (S.I. 2003 No. 1279)
- The Football Spectators (Seating) Order 2003 (S.I. 2003 No.1280)
- The Regulatory Reform (Sugar Beet Research and Education) Order 2003 (S.I. 2003 No. 1281)
- The Commonwealth Development Corporation (Exempt Period) (Appointed Day) Order 2003 (S.I. 2003 No. 1282)
- The North Birmingham College (Dissolution) Order 2003 (S.I. 2003 No.1293)
- The Financial Services and Markets Act 2000 (Communications by Actuaries) Regulations 2003 (S.I. 2003 No. 1294)
- The Feeding Stuffs (Sampling and Analysis), the Feeding Stuffs (Enforcement) and the Feeding Stuffs (Establishments and Intermediaries) (Amendment) (England) Regulations 2003 (S.I. 2003 No.1296)
- The Terrorism (United Nations Measures) Order 2001 (Amendment) Regulations 2003 (S.I. 2003 No. 1297)

== 1301–1400 ==
- The Judicial Pensions and Retirement Act 1993 (Addition of Qualifying Judicial Offices) Order 2003 (S.I. 2003 No. 1311)
- Civil Legal Aid (General) (Amendment) Regulations 2003 (S.I. 2003 No. 1312)
- The A1237 Trunk Road (Rawcliffe Roundabout to Hopgrove Roundabout) (Detrunking) Order 2003 (S.I. 2003 No. 1313)
- The Motor Vehicle Tyres (Safety) (Amendment) Regulations 2003 (S.I. 2003 No. 1316)
- The Government Resources and Accounts Act 2000(Audit of Health Service Bodies) Order 2003 (S.I. 2003 No. 1324)
- The Government Resources and Accounts Act 2000 (Rights of Access of Comptroller and Auditor General) Order 2003 (S.I. 2003 No. 1325)
- The Government Resources and Accounts Act 2000 (Audit of Public Bodies) Order 2003 (S.I. 2003 No. 1326)
- The Education (National Curriculum) (Foundation Stage Profile Assessment Arrangements) (England) Order 2003 (S.I. 2003 No. 1327)
- The Protection of Animals (Anaesthetics) (Amendment) (No. 2) (England) Order 2003 (S.I. 2003 No. 1328)
- The Civil Procedure (Amendment No. 3) Rules 2003 (S.I. 2003 No. 1329 (L. 27)])
- The Transport of Animals (Cleansing and Disinfection) (England) (No. 2) Order 2003 (S.I. 2003 No. 1336)
- The Social Security (Contributions) (Amendment No. 4) Regulations 2003 (S.I. 2003 No. 1337)
- The Housing Benefit and Council Tax Benefit (State Pension Credit) (Abolition of Benefit Periods) Amendment Regulations 2003 (S.I. 2003 No. 1338)
- The Nationality, Immigration and Asylum Act 2002 (Commencement No. 4) (Amendment) (No. 2) Order 2003 (S.I. 2003 No. 1339 (C. 67)])
- The Medical Act 1983 (Amendment) Order 2002 (Transitory Provisions) Order of Council 2003 (S.I. 2003 No. 1340)
- The General Medical Council (Voluntary Erasure and Restoration following Voluntary Erasure) Regulations Order of Council 2003 (S.I. 2003 No. 1341)
- The General Medical Council (Restoration and Registration Fees Amendment) Regulations Order of Council 2003 (S.I. 2003 No. 1342)
- The General Medical Council Fitness to Practise Committees and Review Board for Overseas Qualified Practitioners (Amendment) Rules Order of Council 2003 (S.I. 2003 No. 1343)
- The General Medical Council (Constitution of Fitness to Practise Committees) (Transitional Arrangements) Rules Order of Council 2003 (S.I. 2003 No. 1344)
- The Iraq (United Nations Sanctions) (Amendment) Order 2003 (S.I. 2003 No. 1347)
- The Adoption Support Services (Local Authorities) (England) Regulations 2003 (S.I. 2003 No. 1348)
- Fines (Deductions from Income Support) (Amendment) Regulations 2003 (S.I. 2003 No. 1360)
- The Income Tax (Exemption of Minor Benefits) (Increase in Sums of Money) Order 2003 (S.I. 2003 No. 1361)
- The Air Navigation (General) (Amendment) Regulations 2003 (S.I. 2003 No. 1365)
- The Insolvent Companies (Disqualification of Unfit Directors) Proceedings (Amendment) Rules 2003 (S.I. 2003 No. 1367)
- The Enterprise Act 2002 (Super-complaints to Regulators) Order 2003 (S.I. 2003 No. 1368)
- The Enterprise Act 2002 (Merger Prenotification) Regulations 2003 (S.I. 2003 No. 1369)
- The Enterprise Act 2002 (Merger Fees and Determination of Turnover) Order 2003 (S.I. 2003 No. 1370)
- The Competition Commission (Penalties) Order 2003 (S.I. 2003 No. 1371)
- The Competition Appeal Tribunal Rules 2003 (S.I. 2003 No. 1372)
- The OFT Registers of Undertakings and Orders (Available Hours) Order 2003 (S.I. 2003 No. 1373)
- The Enterprise Act 2002 (Part 8 Community Infringements Specified UK Laws) Order 2003 (S.I. 2003 No. 1374)
- The Enterprise Act 2002 (Part 8 Request for Consultation) Order 2003 (S.I. 2003 No. 1375)
- The Enterprise Act 2002 (Part 8 Notice to OFT of Intended Prosecution Specified Enactments, Revocation and Transitional Provision) Order 2003 (S.I. 2003 No. 1376)
- The School Governance (Procedures) (England) Regulations 2003 (S.I. 2003 No. 1377)
- The Tax Credits (Employer Penalty Appeals) Regulations 2003 (S.I. 2003 No. 1382)
- The Food Supplements (England) Regulations 2003 (S.I. 2003 No. 1387)
- The A1041 Trunk Road (540m South of Abbots Road to 240m Southwest of The Centre of Carlton New Bridge) (Detrunking) (Amendment) Order 2003 (S.I. 2003 No. 1388)
- The A65 Trunk Road (Thorlby Roundabout to North Yorkshire/City of Bradford Boundary) (Detrunking) (Amendment) Order 2003 (S.I. 2003 No. 1389)
- The Enterprise Act 2002 (Commencement No. 3, Transitional and Transitory Provisions and Savings)Order 2003 (S.I. 2003 No. 1397 (C. 60)])
- The Enterprise Act 2002 (Consequential and Supplemental Provisions) Order 2003 (S.I. 2003 No. 1398)
- The Enterprise Act 2002 (Part 8 Designated Enforcers: Criteria for Designation, Designation of Public Bodies as Designated Enforcers and Transitional Provisions) Order 2003 (S.I. 2003 No. 1399)
- The Enterprise Act 2002 (Part 9 Restrictions on Disclosure of Information) (Amendment and Specification) Order 2003 (S.I. 2003 No. 1400)

== 1401–1500 ==
- The European Parliament (Representation) Act 2003 (Commencement No. 1) Order 2003 (S.I. 2003 No. 1401 (C. 61)])
- The European Parliament (Representation) Act 2003 (Commencement No. 2) Order 2003 (S.I. 2003 No. 1402 (C. 62)])
- The Disease Control (Interim Measures) (Wales) (No.2) Order 2003 (S.I. 2003 No. 1414 (W.166))
- Gorchymyn Rheoli Clefydau (Mesurau Dros Dro) (Cymru) (Rhif 2) 2003 (S.I. 2003 Rhif 1414 (Cy.166 ))
- The Tobacco Advertising and Promotion (Sponsorship) Transitional (Amendment) Regulations 2003 (S.I. 2003 No. 1415)
- The European Parliament (United Kingdom Representatives) Pensions (Amendment) Order 2003 (S.I. 2003 No. 1416)
- The Land Registration Rules 2003 (S.I. 2003 No. 1417)
- The Police Act 1997 (Criminal Records) (Amendment No. 4) Regulations 2003 (S.I. 2003 No. 1418)
- The Education (Additional Secondary School Proposals) (Amendment) Regulations 2003 (S.I. 2003 No.1421)
- The A19 Trunk Road (North Yorkshire/City of York Boundary to A19/A63 Junction) (Detrunking) Order 2003 (S.I. 2003 No. 1423)
- The A19 Trunk Road (North Yorkshire/City of York Boundary to A19/A168 Roundabout) (Detrunking)Order 2003 (S.I. 2003 No. 1424)
- The A64 Trunk Road (City of Leeds/North Yorkshire County Boundary to A64/A1 Roundabout) (Detrunking) Order 2003 (S.I. 2003 No. 1425)
- The A629 Trunk Road (Thorlby Roundabout to Snaygill Roundabout) (Detrunking) Order 2003 (S.I. 2003 No. 1426)
- The Diseases of Animals (Approved Disinfectants) (Amendment) (England) Order 2003 (S.I. 2003 No. 1428)
- The Carriage of Dangerous Goods and Transportable Pressure Vessels (Amendment) Regulations 2003 (S.I. 2003 No. 1431)
- The Misuse of Drugs (Amendment) Regulations 2003 (S.I. 2003 No. 1432)
- The Income Tax (Exemption of Minor Benefits) (Amendment) Regulations 2003 (S.I. 2003 No. 1434)
- The Rail Vehicle Accessibility (Furness Railway Trust North London Coach) Exemption Order 2003 (S.I. 2003 No. 1436)
- The Insolvency Act 1986 (Amendment) (Administrative Receivership and Capital Market Arrangements) Order 2003 (S.I. 2003 No. 1468)
- The Immigration and Asylum Act 1999 (Commencement No. 14) Order 2003 (S.I. 2003 No. 1469 (C. 63)])
- The Transport of Animals (Cleansing and Disinfection) (Wales) (No.2) Order 2003 (S.I. 2003 No. 1470 (W.172))
- Gorchymyn Cludo Anifeiliaid (Glanhau a Diheintio) (Cymru) (Rhif 2) 2003 (S.I. 2003 Rhif 1470 (Cy.172))
- The Tobacco Products (Descriptions of Products) Order 2003 (S.I. 2003 No.1471)
- The Finance Act 2002, Schedule 13 (Appointed Day) Order 2003 (S.I. 2003 No. 1472 (C.64)])
- The Insurance Mediation Directive (Miscellaneous Amendments) Regulations 2003 (S.I. 2003 No. 1473)
- The Financial Services and Markets Act 2000 (Misleading Statements and Practices) (Amendment) Order 2003 (S.I. 2003 No. 1474)
- The Financial Services and Markets Act 2000 (Regulated Activities) (Amendment) (No. 1) Order 2003 (S.I. 2003 No. 1475)
- The Financial Services and Markets Act 2000 (Regulated Activities) (Amendment) (No. 2) Order 2003 (S.I. 2003 No. 1476)
- The Contaminants in Food (England) Regulations 2003 (S.I. 2003 No. 1478)
- The Highways, Crime Prevention etc.(Special Extinguishment and Special Diversion Orders) Regulations 2003 (S.I. 2003 No. 1479)
- The Animal By-Products Regulations 2003 (S.I. 2003 No. 1482)
- The Local Authorities (Code of Conduct) (Local Determination) Regulations 2003 (S.I. 2003 No. 1483)
- The Animal By-Products (Identification) (Amendment) (England) Regulations 2003 (S.I. 2003 No. 1484)
- The Value Added Tax (Amendment) (No. 4) Regulations 2003 (S.I. 2003 No. 1485)
- The Canterbury and Thanet Community Healthcare National Health Service Trust (Change of Name) Amendment Order 2003 (S.I. 2003 No. 1496)
- The National Health Service (Functions of Strategic Health Authorities and Primary Care Trusts and Administration Arrangements) (England) (Amendment) Regulations 2003 (S.I. 2003 No. 1497)
- The Royal Hospital of St. Bartholomew, the Royal London Hospital and London Chest Hospital National Health Service Trust (Establishment) Amendment Order 2003 (S.I. 2003 No. 1499)
- The Epsom and St. Helier National Health Service Trust (Change of Name) Amendment Order 2003 (S.I. 2003 No. 1500)

== 1501–1600 ==
- The Haringey Primary Care Trust (Change of Name) Amendment Order 2003 (S.I. 2003 No. 1501)
- The Immigration Control (Charges) (Basic Service) Regulations 2003 (S.I. 2003 No. 1502)
- The Feeding Stuffs, the Feeding Stuffs (Sampling and Analysis) and the Feeding Stuffs (Enforcement) (Amendment) (England) Regulations 2003 (S.I. 2003 No.1503)
- The Creosote (Prohibition on Use and Marketing)(No. 2) Regulations 2003 (S.I. 2003 No. 1511)
- The Home-Grown Cereals Authority (Rate of Levy) Order 2003 (S.I. 2003 No. 1512)
- The Gaming Clubs (Licensing) (Amendment) Regulations 2003 (S.I. 2003 No. 1513)
- The Cayman Islands (Constitution) (Amendment) Order 2003 (S.I. 2003 No. 1515)
- The Iraq (United Nations Sanctions) (Overseas Territories) Order 2003 (S.I. 2003 No. 1516)
- The Copyright (Bermuda) Order 2003 (S.I. 2003 No. 1517)
- The Child Abduction and Custody (Parties to Conventions) (Amendment) Order 2003 (S.I. 2003 No. 1518)
- The Iraq (United Nations Sanctions) Order 2003 (S.I. 2003 No. 1519)
- The Health Service Commissioner for England (Health Protection Agency (Yr Asiantaeth Diogelu Iechyd)) Order 2003 (S.I. 2003 No. 1520)
- The Iraq (United Nations Sanctions) (Channel Islands) Order 2003 (S.I. 2003 No. 1521)
- The Iraq (United Nations Sanctions) (Isle of Man) Order 2003 (S.I. 2003 No. 1522)
- The Tobacco Products (Amendment) Regulations 2003 (S.I. 2003 No.1523)
- The Sea Fishing (Restriction on Days at Sea) (No. 2) Order 2003 (S.I. 2003 No. 1535)
- The Football Spectators (Seating) (No.2) Order 2003 (S.I. 2003 No.1541)
- Postal Services Act 2000 (Consequential Modifications to Local Enactments) Order 2003 (SI 2003/1542)
- The Regulatory Reform (British Waterways Board) Order 2003 (S.I. 2003 No. 1545)
- The European Communities (Definition of Treaties) (Euro-Mediterranean Agreement establishing an Association between the European Communities and their Member States and the Arab Republic of Egypt) Order 2003 (S.I. 2003 No. 1554)
- The Export of Goods (Control) (Iraq and Kuwait Sanctions) (Revocation) Order 2003 (S.I. 2003 No. 1555)
- The European Communities (Definition of Treaties) (Agreement establishing an association between the European Community and its Member States and the Republic of Chile) Order 2003 (S.I. 2003 No. 1556)
- The Local and European Parliamentary Elections (Registration of Citizens of Accession States) Regulations 2003 (S.I. 2003 No. 1557)
- New Schools (General) (England) Regulations 2003 (S.I. 2003 No.1558)
- The Prohibition of Fishing with Multiple Trawls Order 2003 (S.I. 2003 No. 1559)
- The Sea Fish (Specified Sea Areas) (Regulation of Nets and Other Fishing Gear) (Amendment) Order 2003 (S.I. 2003 No. 1560)
- The Rail Vehicle Accessibility (Great Eastern Railway Class 360 Vehicles) Exemption Order 2003 (S.I. 2003 No. 1562)
- The Specified Sugar Products (England) Regulations 2003 (S.I. 2003 No. 1563)
- The Fruit Juices and Fruit Nectars (England) Regulations 2003 (S.I. 2003 No. 1564)
- The Value Added Tax (Finance) Order 2003 (S.I. 2003 No. 1568)
- The Value Added Tax (Finance) (No. 2) Order 2003 (S.I. 2003 No. 1569)
- The Social Fund Maternity and Funeral Expenses (General) Amendment (No. 2) Regulations 2003 (S.I. 2003 No. 1570)
- The Health Professions (Parts of and Entries in the Register) Order of Council 2003 (S.I. 2003 No. 1571)
- The Health Professions Council (Registration and Fees) Rules Order of Council 2003 (S.I. 2003 No. 1572)
- The Health Professions Council (Screeners) Rules Order of Council 2003 (S.I. 2003 No. 1573)
- The Health Professions Council (Investigating Committee) Procedure Rules Order of Council 2003 (S.I. 2003 No. 1574)
- The Health Professions Council (Conduct and Competence Committee) (Procedure) Rules Order of Council 2003 (S.I. 2003 No. 1575)
- The Health Professions Council (Health Committee) (Procedure) Rules Order of Council 2003 (S.I. 2003 No. 1576)
- The Health Professions Council (Functions of Assessors) Rules Order of Council 2003 (S.I. 2003 No. 1577)
- Health Professions Order 2001 (Legal Assessors) Order of Council 2003 (S.I. 2003 No. 1578)
- The Health Professions Council (Registration Appeals) Rules Order of Council 2003 (S.I. 2003 No. 1579)
- The National Health Service Reform and Health Care Professions Act 2002 (Commencement No. 5) Order 2003 (S.I. 2003 No. 1580 (C.65)])
- The State Pension Credit (Decisions and Appeals-Amendments) Regulations 2003 (S.I. 2003 No. 1581)
- The Commission for Health Improvement (Functions) Regulations 2003 (S.I. 2003 No. 1587)
- The Education (Grants for Disabled Postgraduate Students) (Amendment) Regulations 2003 (S.I. 2003 No. 1588)
- The Social Security (Back to Work Bonus and Lone Parent Run-on) (Amendment and Revocation) Regulations 2003 (S.I. 2003 No.1589)
- The Health Professions Order 2001 (Consequential Amendments) Order 2003 (S.I. 2003 No. 1590)
- The Access to the Countryside (Correction of Provisional and Conclusive Maps) (England) Regulations 2003 (S.I. 2003 No. 1591)
- The Enterprise Act 2002 (Protection of Legitimate Interests) Order 2003 (S.I. 2003 No. 1592)
- The Enterprise Act 2002 (Part 8 Domestic Infringements) Order 2003 (S.I. 2003 No. 1593)
- The Enterprise Act 2002 (Supply of Services) Order 2003 (S.I. 2003 No. 1594)
- The Enterprise Act 2002 (Anticipated Mergers) Order 2003 (S.I. 2003 No. 1595)
- The Condensed Milk and Dried Milk (England) Regulations 2003 (S.I. 2003 No. 1596)
- The Fuel-testing Pilot Projects (Methanol Project) Regulations 2003 (S.I. 2003 No. 1597)
- The Immigration (Passenger Transit Visa) (Amendment) Order 2003 (S.I. 2003 No. 1598)
- The A500 Trunk Road (Stoke Pathfinder Project) Detrunking Order 2003 (S.I. 2003 No. 1599)
- The M2 Junction 2 to A228 Link Road (Trunking)Order 2003 (S.I. 2003 No. 1600)

== 1601–1700 ==
- The A500 Trunk Road (Stoke Pathfinder Project) and Slip Roads Order 2003 (S.I. 2003 No. 1601)
- The Release of Short-Term Prisoners on Licence (Amendment of Requisite Period) Order 2003 (S.I. 2003 No. 1602)
- The Referral Orders (Amendment of Referral Conditions) Regulations 2003 (S.I. 2003 No. 1605)
- The Rycotewood College, Oxford College of Further Education and North Oxfordshire College and School of Art (Dissolution) Order 2003 (S.I. 2003 No.1610)
- The Merrist Wood College (Dissolution) Order 2003 (S.I. 2003 No. 1611)
- The Land Registration Act 2002 (Commencement No. 3) Order 2003 (S.I. 2003 No. 1612 (C. 66))
- The Transport for London (Reserved Services) (London Underground Limited) Exception Order 2003 (S.I. 2003 No. 1613)
- The Croydon Tramlink (Penalty Fares) Order 2003 (S.I. 2003 No. 1614)
- The Transport for London (Consequential Provisions) Order 2003 (S.I. 2003 No. 1615)
- The Primary Care Trusts (Membership, Procedure and Administration Arrangements) Amendment (England) Regulations 2003 (S.I. 2003 No. 1616)
- The Strategic Health Authorities (Consultation on Changes) Regulations 2003 (S.I. 2003 No. 1617)
- The Medicines for Human Use (Marketing Authorisations Etc.) Amendment Regulations 2003 (S.I. 2003 No. 1618)
- The Race Relations Act 1976 (Amendment) Regulations 2003 (S.I. 2003 No. 1626)
- The Social Security (Claims and Payments and Miscellaneous Amendments) Regulations 2003 (S.I. 2003 No. 1632)
- The Uncertificated Securities (Amendment) (Eligible Debt Securities) Regulations 2003 (S.I. 2003 No. 1633)
- The Adoption of Children from Overseas (Wales)(Amendment) Regulations 2003 (S.I. 2003 No. 1634 (W.176))
- Rheoliadau Mabwysiadu Plant o Wledydd Tramor (Cymru) (Diwygio) 2003 (S.I. 2003 Rhif 1634 (Cy.176))
- The Fish Labelling (Wales) Regulations 2003 (S.I. 2003 No. 1635 (W.177))
- Rheoliadau Labelu Pysgod (Cymru) 2003 (S.I. 2003 Rhif 1635 (Cy.177))
- The Merchant Shipping (Port State Control) (Amendment) Regulations 2003 (S.I. 2003 No. 1636)
- The Safety of Sports Grounds (Designation) (No.2) Order 2003 (S.I. 2003 No. 1637)
- The Magistrates' Courts (Forfeiture of Political Donations) Rules 2003 (S.I. 2003 No. 1645 (L. 28])
- The Crown Court (Forfeiture of Political Donations) Rules 2003 (S.I. 2003 No. 1646 (L. 29))
- The Education (Student Loans) (Amendment) (England and Wales) Regulations 2003 (S.I. 2003 No. 1647)
- The Aycliffe Instrument of Management (Variation) Order 2003 (S.I. 2003 No. 1649)
- The Tax Credits (Provision of Information) (Functions Relating to Health) (No. 2) Regulations 2003 (S.I. 2003 No. 1650)
- The Race Relations Act 1976 (Seamen Recruited Abroad) Order 2003 (S.I. 2003 No. 1651)
- The Income Tax (Professional Fees) Order 2003 (S.I. 2003 No. 1652)
- The Misuse of Drugs (Amendment) (No. 2) Regulations 2003 (S.I. 2003 No. 1653)
- The Equal Pay Act 1970 (Amendment) Regulations 2003 (S.I. 2003 No. 1656)
- The Sex Discrimination Act 1975 (Amendment) Regulations 2003 (S.I. 2003 No. 1657)
- The Inheritance Tax (Delivery of Accounts) (Excepted Estates) (Amendment) Regulations 2003 (S.I. 2003 No. 1658)
- The Cocoa and Chocolate Products (England) Regulations 2003 (S.I. 2003 No. 1659)
- Employment Equality (Religion or Belief) Regulations 2003 (S.I. 2003 No. 1660)
- Employment Equality (Sexual Orientation) Regulations 2003 (S.I. 2003 No. 1661)
- The Education (School Teachers' Qualifications) (England) Regulations 2003 (S.I. 2003 No. 1662)
- The Education (Specified Work and Registration) (England) Regulations 2003 (S.I. 2003 No. 1663)
- The Crown Court (Amendment) (No. 3) Rules 2003 (S.I. 2003 No. 1664 (L. 30)])
- The Employment Act 2002 (Commencement No. 5) Order 2003 (S.I. 2003 No.1666 (C.68)])
- The Education Act 2002 (Commencement No. 6 and Transitional and Saving Provisions) Order 2003 (S.I. 2003 No. 1667 (C. 69)])
- The Contracting Out (Administration of the Teachers' Pensions Scheme) Order 2003 (S.I. 2003 No. 1668)
- The Norton College (Change to School Session Times) Order 2003 (S.I. 2003 No. 1671)
- The Broadcasting (Independent Productions) (Amendment) Order 2003 (S.I. 2003 No. 1672)
- The Disability Discrimination Act 1995 (Amendment) Regulations 2003 (S.I. 2003 No. 1673)
- The Financial Services and Markets Act 2000 (Exemption) (Amendment) (No. 2) Order 2003 (S.I. 2003 No. 1675)
- The Financial Services and Markets Act 2000 (Financial Promotion) (Amendment) Order 2003 (S.I. 2003 No. 1676)
- The Feeding Stuffs (Sampling and Analysis), the Feeding Stuffs (Enforcement) and the Feeding Stuffs (Establishments and Intermediaries) (Amendment) (Wales) Regulations 2003 (S.I. 2003 No. 1677 (W.180))
- Rheoliadau Porthiant (Samplu a Dadansoddi), Porthiant (Gorfodi) a Phorthiant (Sefydliadau a Chyfryngwyr) (Diwygio) (Cymru) 2003 (S.I. 2003 Rhif 1677 (Cy.180))
- The Unlicensed Medicinal Products for Human Use (Transmissible Spongiform Encephalopathies) (Safety) Regulations 2003 (S.I. 2003 No. 1680)
- The Working Time (Amendment) Regulations 2003 (S.I. 2003 No. 1684)
- The Rail Vehicle Accessibility (Festiniog Railway Company Vehicle Number 122) Exemption Order 2003 (S.I. 2003 No. 1687)
- The Charities (The Shrubbery) Order 2003 (S.I. 2003 No. 1688)
- The Health Act 1999 (Commencement No. 13) Order 2003 (S.I. 2003 No. 1689 (C.70))
- The Road Vehicles (Construction and Use) (Amendment) (No. 2) Regulations 2003 (S.I. 2003 No. 1690)
- The Release of Short-Term Prisoners on Licence (Repeal of Age Restriction) Order 2003 (S.I. 2003 No. 1691)
- The Local Authorities (Members' Allowances) (England) (Amendment) Regulations 2003 (S.I. 2003 No. 1692)
- The International Carriage of Perishable Foodstuffs (Amendment) Regulations 2003 (S.I. 2003 No. 1693)
- The Transport Act 2000 (Commencement No. 10) Order 2003 (S.I. 2003 No. 1694 (C.71)])
- The Railways (Rail Passengers' Council and Rail Passengers' Committees) (Exemptions) Order 2003 (S.I. 2003 No. 1695)
- The Merseyrail Electrics Network Order 2003 (S.I. 2003 No. 1696)
- The Medical Devices (Amendment) Regulations 2003 (S.I. 2003 No. 1697)
- The Motor Vehicles (Tests) (Amendment) (No. 2) Regulations 2003 (S.I. 2003 No. 1698)
- The Pollution Prevention and Control (England and Wales) (Amendment) Regulations 2003 (S.I. 2003 No. 1699)
- The Health Professions Order 2001 (Transitional Provisions) Order of Council 2003 (S.I. 2003 No. 1700)

== 1701–1800 ==
- The Social Security Amendment (Students and Income-related Benefits) Regulations 2003 (S.I. 2003 No. 1701)
- The National Health Service (General Dental Services) and (General Dental Services Supplementary List) Amendment Regulations 2003 (S.I. 2003 No. 1702)
- The Care Homes (Amendment No. 2) Regulations 2003 (S.I. 2003 No. 1703)
- The Rail Vehicle Accessibility (South West Trains Class 444 and Class 450 Vehicles) Exemption Order 2003 (S.I. 2003 No. 1704)
- The Education (Assisted Places) (Amendment) (England) Regulations 2003 (S.I. 2003 No. 1705)
- The Home Loss Payments (England) Regulations 2003 (S.I. 2003 No. 1706)
- The Education (Assisted Places) (Incidental Expenses) (Amendment) (England) Regulations 2003 (S.I. 2003 No. 1707)
- The Education (School Teachers' Pay and Conditions) (Amendment) Regulations 2003 (S.I. 2003 No. 1708)
- The Education (School Teachers' Prescribed Qualifications, etc.) Order 2003 (S.I. 2003 No. 1709)
- The Offshore Installations (Safety Zones) (No. 2) Order 2003 (S.I. 2003 No. 1710)
- The Immigration (Leave to Remain) (Fees) Regulations 2003 (S.I. 2003 No. 1711)
- The Immigration (Leave to Remain) (Prescribed Forms and Procedures) Regulations 2003 (S.I. 2003 No. 1712)
- The Sweeteners in Food (Amendment) (Wales) Regulations 2003 (S.I. 2003 No. 1713 (W.181))
- Rheoliadau Melysyddion mewn Bwyd (Diwygio) (Cymru) 2003 (S.I. 2003 Rhif 1713 (Cy.181))
- The Non-Domestic Rating (Collection and Enforcement)(Local Lists) (Amendment) (Wales) Regulations 2003 (S.I. 2003 No. 1714 (W.182))
- Rheoliadau Ardrethu Annomestig (Casglu a Gorfodi) (Rhestri Lleol) (Diwygio) (Cymru) 2003 (S.I. 2003 Rhif 1714 (Cy.182))
- The Council Tax (Administration and Enforcement) (Amendment No.2) (Wales) Regulations 2003 (S.I. 2003 No. 1715 (W.183))
- Rheoliadau'r Dreth Gyngor (Gweinyddu a Gorfodi) (Diwygio Rhif 2) (Cymru) 2003 (S.I. 2003 Rhif 1715 (Cy.183))
- The Community Care Plans (Disapplication) (England) Order 2003 (S.I. 2003 No. 1716)
- The Education Act 2002 (Transitional Provisions and Consequential Amendments) (Wales) Regulations 2003 (S.I. 2003 No. 1717 (W.184))
- Rheoliadau Deddf Addysg 2002 (Darpariaethau Trosiannol a Diwygiadau Canlyniadol) (Cymru) 2003 (S.I. 2003 Rhif 1717 (Cy.184))
- The Education Act 2002 (Commencement No. 2) (Wales) Order 2003 (S.I. 2003 No. 1718 (W.185) (C.72))
- Gorchymyn Deddf Addysg 2002 (Cychwyn Rhif 2) (Cymru) 2003 (S.I. 2003 Rhif 1718 (Cy.185) (C.72))
- The Food Supplements (Wales) Regulations 2003 (S.I. 2003 No. 1719 (W.186))
- Rheoliadau Ychwanegion Bwyd (Cymru) 2003 (S.I. 2003 Rhif 1719 (Cy.186))
- The Environmental Protection (Duty of Care) (Amendment) (Wales) Regulations 2003 (S.I. 2003 No. 1720 (W.187))
- Rheoliadau Diogelu'r Amgylchedd (Dyletswydd Gofal) (Diwygio) (Cymru) 2003 (S.I. 2003 Rhif 1720 (Cy.187))
- The Contaminants in Food (Wales) Regulations 2003 (S.I. 2003 No. 1721 (W.188))
- Rheoliadau Halogion mewn Bwyd (Cymru) 2002 (S.I. 2003 Rhif 1721 (Cy.188))
- The Food (Brazil Nuts) (Emergency Control) (England) Regulations 2003 (S.I. 2003 No. 1722)
- The Animal Gatherings (England) Order 2003 (S.I. 2003 No. 1723)
- The Transport of Animals (Cleansing and Disinfection) (England) (No. 3) Order 2003 (S.I. 2003 No. 1724)
- The Land Registration Act 2002 (Commencement No. 4) Order 2003 (S.I. 2003 No. 1725 (C.73)])
- The Welfare of Farmed Animals (Wales) (Amendment) Regulations 2003 (S.I. 2003 No. 1726 (W.189))
- Rheoliadau Lles Anifeiliaid a Ffermir (Cymru) (Diwygio) 2003 (S.I. 2003 Rhif 1726 (Cy.189))
- The Occupational Pension Schemes (Transfer Values and Miscellaneous Amendments) Regulations 2003 (S.I. 2003 No. 1727)
- The Sheep and Goats Identification and Movement (Interim Measures) (England) (No. 2) (Amendment No. 3) Order 2003 (S.I. 2003 No. 1728)
- The Disease Control (England) Order 2003 (S.I. 2003 No. 1729)
- The Insolvency (Amendment) Rules 2003 (S.I. 2003 No. 1730)
- The Social Security (Working Tax Credit and Child Tax Credit) (Consequential Amendments) (No. 3) Regulations 2003 (S.I. 2003 No. 1731)
- The Education (School Organisation Plans) (Wales) Regulations 2003 (S.I. 2003 No. 1732 (W.190))
- Rheoliadau Addysg (Cynlluniau Trefniadaeth Ysgolion) (Cymru) 2003 (S.I. 2003 Rhif 1732 (Cy.190))
- The Court of Protection (Amendment) Rules 2003 (S.I. 2003 No. 1733)
- The Avian Influenza and Newcastle Disease (England and Wales) Order 2003 (S.I. 2003 No. 1734)
- The Asylum Support Appeals (Procedure) (Amendment) Rules 2003 (S.I. 2003 No. 1735)
- The Collagen and Gelatine (Intra-Community Trade) (England) Regulations 2003 (S.I. 2003 No. 1736)
- The Social Fund Winter Fuel Payment (Amendment) Regulations 2003 (S.I. 2003 No. 1737)
- The Nursing and Midwifery Council (Practice Committees) (Interim Constitution) Rules Order of Council 2003 (S.I. 2003 No. 1738)
- The African Development Fund (Ninth Replenishment) Order 2003 (S.I. 2003 No. 1739)
- The Primary Care Trusts (Establishment) Amendment Order 2003 (S.I. 2003 No. 1740)
- The Civil Aviation (Air Travel Organisers' Licensing)(Amendment) Regulations 2003 (S.I. 2003 No. 1741)
- The Aerodromes (Noise Restrictions) (Rules and Procedures) Regulations 2003 (S.I. 2003 No. 1742)
- The A57 Trunk Road (Markham Moor to Lincoln) (Detrunking) Order 2003 (S.I. 2003 No. 1743)
- The Capital Allowances (Energy-saving Plant and Machinery) (Amendment) Order 2003 (S.I. 2003 No. 1744)
- The Charitable Deductions (Approved Schemes) (Amendment) Regulations 2003 (S.I. 2003 No. 1745)
- The Electricity and Gas (Modification of Standard Conditions of Licences) Order 2003 (S.I. 2003 No. 1746)
- The Nationality, Immigration and Asylum Act 2002 (Commencement No. 5) Order 2003 (S.I. 2003 No. 1747 (C.74)])
- The State Pension Credit Act 2002 (Commencement No.5) and Appointed Day Order 2003 (S.I. 2003 No. 1766 (C.75 )])
- The Social Security Pensions (Home Responsibilities) Amendment Regulations 2003 (S.I. 2003 No. 1767)
- The Food Safety (Ships and Aircraft) (Wales) Order 2003 (S.I. 2003 No. 1774 (W.191))
- Gorchymyn Diogelwch Bwyd (Llongau ac Awyrennau) (Cymru) 2003 (S.I. 2003 Rhif 1774 (Cy.191))
- The Common Agricultural Policy (Wine) (Wales) (Amendment) Regulations 2003 (S.I. 2003 No. 1776 (W.192))
- Rheoliadau'r Polisi Amaethyddol Cyffredin (Gwin) (Cymru) (Diwygio) 2003 (S.I. 2003 Rhif 1776 (Cy.192))
- The Education (Assisted Places) (Incidental Expenses) (Amendment) (Wales) Regulations 2003 (S.I. 2003 No. 1779 (W.193))
- Rheoliadau Addysg (Lleoedd a Gynorthwyir) (Mân Dreuliau) (Diwygio) (Cymru) 2003 (S.I. 2003 Rhif 1779 (Cy.193))
- The Plant Protection Products (Amendment) Regulations 2003 (S.I. 2003 No. 1787)
- The Urban Waste Water Treatment (England and Wales) (Amendment) Regulations 2003 (S.I. 2003 No. 1788)

== 1801–1900 ==
- The Merchant Shipping and Fishing Vessels (Port Waste Reception Facilities) Regulations 2003 (S.I. 2003 No. 1809)
- The Burma (Freezing of Funds) (Amendment) Regulations 2003 (S.I. 2003 No. 1810)
- The International Carriage of Dangerous Goods by Road (Fees) (Amendment) Regulations 2003 (S.I. 2003 No. 1811)
- The Passenger and Goods Vehicles (Recording Equipment) (Approval of Fitters and Workshops) (Fees) (Amendment) Regulations 2003 (S.I. 2003 No. 1812)
- The International Transport of Goods under Cover of TIR Carnets (Fees) (Amendment) Regulations 2003 (S.I. 2003 No. 1813)
- The Vehicle Excise Duty (Reduced Pollution) (Amendment) Regulations 2003 (S.I. 2003 No. 1814)
- The Motor Vehicles (Tests) (Amendment) (No. 3) Regulations 2003 (S.I. 2003 No. 1815)
- The Goods Vehicles (Plating and Testing) (Amendment) Regulations 2003 (S.I. 2003 No. 1816)
- The Public Service Vehicles (Conditions of Fitness, Equipment, Use and Certification) (Amendment) Regulations 2003 (S.I. 2003 No. 1817)
- The Public Service Vehicles Accessibility (Amendment) Regulations 2003 (S.I. 2003 No. 1818)
- The National Treatment Agency (Establishment and Constitution) Amendment Order 2003 (S.I. 2003 No. 1827)
- The Insurance Companies (Taxation of Reinsurance Business) (Amendment) Regulations 2003 (S.I. 2003 No. 1828)
- The Double Taxation Relief (Surrender of Relievable Tax Within a Group) (Amendment) Regulations 2003 (S.I. 2003 No. 1829)
- The Income Tax (Authorised Unit Trusts) (Interest Distributions) Regulations 2003 (S.I. 2003 No. 1830)
- The Open-ended Investment Companies (Tax) (Amendment) Regulations 2003 (S.I. 2003 No. 1831)
- The Insolvency Act 1986 (Amendment) (Administrative Receivership and Urban Regeneration etc.) Order 2003 (S.I. 2003 No. 1832)
- The Protection of Animals (Anaesthetics) Amendment (Wales) Order 2003 (S.I. 2003 No. 1844 (W.196))
- Gorchymyn Diogelu Anifeiliaid (Anesthetyddion) Diwygio (Cymru) 2003 (S.I. 2003 Rhif 1844 (Cy.196))
- The Care Homes (Adult Placements) (Amendment) Regulations 2003 (S.I. 2003 No. 1845)
- The Horticultural Produce (Community Grading Rules) (England and Wales) Regulations 2003 (S.I. 2003 No. 1846)
- The Coast Protection (Notices) (Wales) Regulations 2003 (S.I. 2003 No. 1847 (W.197))
- Rheoliadau Diogelu'r Arfordir (Hysbysiadau) (Cymru) 2003 (S.I. 2003 Rhif 1847 (Cy.197))
- The Air Quality (Ozone) (Wales) Regulations 2003 (S.I. 2003 No. 1848 (W.198))
- Rheoliadau Ansawdd Aer (Osôn) (Cymru) 2003 (S.I. 2003 Rhif . 1848 (Cy.198)])
- The Animal By-Products (Identification) (Amendment) (Wales) Regulations 2003 (S.I. 2003 No. 1849 (W.199))
- Rheoliadau Sgil-gynhyrchion Anifeiliaid (Adnabod) (Diwygio) (Cymru) 2003 (S.I. 2003 Rhif 1849 (Cy.199))
- The Feeding Stuffs, the Feeding Stuffs (Sampling and Analysis) and the Feeding Stuffs (Enforcement) (Amendment) (Wales) Regulations 2003 (S.I. 2003 No. 1850 (W.200))
- Rheoliadau Porthiant, Porthiant (Samplu a Dadansoddi) a Phorthiant (Gorfodi) (Diwygio) (Cymru) 2003 (S.I. 2003 Rhif 1850 (Cy.200))
- The Plant Health (Amendment) (Wales) Order 2003 (S.I. 2003 No. 1851 (W.201))
- Gorchymyn Iechyd Planhigion (Diwygio) (Cymru) 2003 (S.I. 2003 1851 Rhif (Cy.201)])
- The Action Programme for Nitrate Vulnerable Zones (Amendment) (Wales) Regulations 2003 (S.I. 2003 No. 1852 (W. 202))
- Rheoliadau'r Rhaglen Weithredu ar gyfer Parthau Perygl Nitradau (Diwygio) (Cymru) 2003 (S.I. 2003 Rhif 1852 (Cy. 202))
- The Housing (Right to Buy) (Priority of Charges) (Wales) Order 2003 (S.I. 2003 No. 1853 (W.203))
- Gorchymyn Tai (Hawl i Brynu) (Blaenoriaeth Arwystlon) (Cymru) 2003 (S.I. 2003 Rhif 1853 (Cy.203))
- The Education (Assisted Places) (Amendment) (Wales) Regulations 2003 (S.I. 2003 No. 1854 (W.204))
- Rheoliadau Addysg (Lleoedd a Gynorthwyir) (Diwygio) (Cymru) 2003 (S.I. 2003 Rhif 1854 (Cy.204))
- The Prohibition of Fishing with Multiple Trawls (Wales) Order 2003 (S.I. 2003 No. 1855 (W.205))
- Gorchymyn Gwahardd Pysgota â Threillrwydi Lluosog (Cymru) 2003 (S.I. 2003 Rhif 1855 (Cy.205))
- The Home Loss Payments (Prescribed Amounts) (Wales) Regulations 2003 (S.I. 2003 No. 1856 (W.206))
- Rheoliadau Taliadau Colli Cartref (Symiau Rhagnodedig) (Cymru) 2003 (S.I. 2003 Rhif 1856 (Cy.206))
- The Enforcement of Road Traffic Debts (Certificated Bailiffs) (Amendment) Regulations 2003 (S.I. 2003 No. 1857 (L.31)])
- The Distress for Rent (Amendment) Rules 2003 (S.I. 2003 No. 1858 (L.32)])
- The Life Assurance (Apportionment of Receipts of Participating Funds) (Applicable Percentage) Order 2003 (S.I. 2003 No. 1860)
- The Corporation Tax (Treatment of Unrelieved Surplus Advance Corporation Tax) (Amendment) Regulations 2003 (S.I. 2003 No. 1861)
- The Immigration and Asylum Act 1999 (Commencement No. 15) Order 2003 (S.I. 2003 No. 1862 (C.76)])
- The Suppression of Terrorism Act 1978 (Designation of Countries) (No. 2) Order 2003 (S.I. 2003 No. 1863)
- The Welfare Food (Amendment No. 2) Regulations 2003 (S.I. 2003 No. 1864)
- The Education (Recognised Bodies) (England) Order 2003 (S.I. 2003 No. 1865)
- The Motor Vehicles (Type Approval for Goods Vehicles) (Great Britain) (Amendment) (No. 2) Regulations 2003 (S.I. 2003 No. 1866)
- The Radioactive Material (Road Transport) (Amendment) Regulations 2003 (S.I. 2003 No. 1867)
- The Angola (United Nations Sanctions) (Revocation) Order 2003 (S.I. 2003 No. 1868)
- The Army, Air Force and Naval Discipline Acts (Continuation) Order 2003 (S.I. 2003 No. 1869)
- The Extradition (Designated Commonwealth Countries) (Amendment) Order 2003 (S.I. 2003 No. 1870)
- The Consular Fees Order 2003 (S.I. 2003 No 1871)
- The Education (Inspectors of Schools in England) Order 2003 (S.I. 2003 No. 1872)
- The European Convention on Extradition (Amendment No. 2) Order 2003 (S.I. 2003 No. 1873)
- The Social Security Contributions and Benefits Act 1992 (Modification of Section 4A) Order 2003 (S.I. 2003 No. 1874)
- The Immigration (Provision of Physical Data) Regulations 2003 (S.I. 2003 No. 1875)
- The Liberia (United Nations Sanctions) (Overseas Territories) (Amendment) Order 2003 (S.I. 2003 No. 1876)
- The Merchant Shipping (Confirmation of Legislation) (Falkland Islands) Order 2003 (S.I. 2003 No. 1877)
- The European Convention on Extradition (Fiscal Offences) (Amendment No. 2) Order 2003 (S.I. 2003 No. 1878)
- The Judicial Committee (General Appellate Jurisdiction) Rules (Amendment) Order 2003 (S.I. 2003 No. 1879)
- The Judicial Committee (Devolution Issues) Rules (Amendment) Order 2003 (S.I. 2003 No. 1880)
- The Exempt Charities Order 2003 (S.I. 2003 No. 1881)
- The Freedom of Information (Additional Public Authorities) Order 2003 (S.I. 2003 No. 1882)
- The Freedom of Information (Removal of References to Public Authorities) Order 2003 (S.I. 2003 No. 1883)
- The Social Security Contributions and Benefits (Northern Ireland) Act 1992 (Modification of Section 4A) Order 2003 (S.I. 2003 No. 1884)
- The Budget (No. 2) (Northern Ireland) Order 2003 (S.I. 2003 No. 1885 (N.I. 14)])
- The Social Security (Jobcentre Plus Interviews for Partners) Regulations 2003 (S.I. 2003 No. 1886)
- The Secretary of State for Constitutional Affairs Order 2003 (S.I. 2003 No. 1887)
- The European Communities (Designation) (No. 3) Order 2003 (S.I. 2003 No. 1888)
- The Asbestos (Prohibitions) (Amendment) Regulations 2003 (S.I. 2003 No. 1889)
- The Northern Ireland Act 1998 (Modification) Order 2003 (S.I. 2003 No. 1890)
- The European Communities (Definition of Treaties) (Database Protection Agreement between the United Kingdom on behalf of the Isle of Man and the European Community) Order 2003 (S.I. 2003 No. 1891)
- The Representation of the People (Form of Canvass) (Scotland) Regulations 2003 (S.I. 2003 No. 1892 (S. 6)])
- The Food Safety (Ships and Aircraft) (England and Scotland) Order 2003 (S.I. 2003 No. 1895)
- The Representation of the People (Form of Canvass) (England and Wales) Regulations 2003 (S.I. 2003 No. 1899)
- The Communications Act 2003 (Commencement No. 1) Order 2003 (S.I. 2003 No. 1900 (C. 77))

== 1901–2000 ==
- The Advanced Television Services Regulations 2003 (S.I. 2003 No. 1901)
- The Wireless Telegraphy (Limitation of Number of Licences) Order 2003 (S.I. 2003 No. 1902)
- The Radio Equipment and Telecommunications Terminal Equipment (Amendment) Regulations 2003 (S.I. 2003 No. 1903)
- The Electronic Communications (Universal Service) Order 2003 (S.I. 2003 No. 1904)
- The Greater London Authority Elections (Election Addresses) Order 2003 (S.I. 2003 No. 1907)
- The Contracting Out (Functions in relation to the Management of Crown Lands) Order 2003 (S.I. 2003 No. 1908)
- The Horserace Betting Levy (Bookmakers' Committee) Regulations 2003 (S.I. 2003 No. 1909)
- The Education (Independent School Standards) (England) Regulations 2003 (S.I. 2003 No. 1910)
- Licensing Act 2003 (Commencement) Order 2003 (S.I. 2003 No. 1911 (C.78)])
- The London Regional Transport (Dissolution) Order 2003 (S.I. 2003 No. 1913)
- The Social Security Amendment (Students and Income-related Benefits)(No. 2) Regulations 2003 (S.I. 2003 No. 1914)
- The Coast Protection (Variation of Excluded Waters) (River Teifi) (Wales) Regulations 2003 (S.I. 2003 No. 1915 (W.209))
- Rheoliadau Diogelu'r Arfordir (Amrywio'r Dyfroedd an Eithrir) (Afon Teifi) (Cymru) 2003 (S.I. 2003 Rhif 1915 (Cy.209))
- School Governance (Constitution and Procedures) (England) (Amendment) Regulations 2003 (S.I. 2003 No. 1916)
- Education (Teacher Student Loans) (Repayment etc.) Regulations 2003 (S.I. 2003 No. 1917)
- The Official Secrets Act 1989 (Prescription) (Amendment) Order 2003 (S.I. 2003 No. 1918)
- The Asylum (Designated States) (No. 2) Order 2003 (S.I. 2003 No. 1919)
- The Greater London Authority Act 1999 (Commencement No. 11) Order 2003 (S.I. 2003 No. 1920 (C. 79)])
- The Annual Parents' Meetings (Exemptions) (England) Regulations 2003 (S.I. 2003 No. 1921)
- The Timeshare Act 1992 (Amendment) Regulations 2003 (S.I. 2003 No. 1922)
- The National Minimum Wage Regulations 1999 (Amendment) Regulations 2003 (S.I. 2003 No. 1923)
- The Road Traffic (Permitted Parking Area and Special Parking Area)(Borough of Swindon) Order 2003 (S.I. 2003 No. 1924)
- The Education (Independent School Inspection Fees and Publication) (England) Regulations 2003 (S.I. 2003 No. 1926)
- The Parochial Fees Order 2003 (S.I. 2003 No. 1932)
- The Ecclesiastical Judges, Legal Officers and Others (Fees) Order 2003 (S.I. 2003 No. 1933)
- The Education (Provision of Information by Independent Schools) (England) Regulations 2003 (S.I. 2003 No.1934)
- The Sexual Offences (Amendment) Act 2000 (Commencement No. 3) Order 2003 (S.I. 2003 No. 1935 (C.80)])
- The Legal Officers (Annual Fees) Order 2003 (S.I. 2003 No. 1936)
- The National Health Service Reform and Health Care Professions Act 2002 (Supplementary, Consequential etc. Provisions) Regulations 2003 (S.I. 2003 No. 1937)
- The Export of Goods (Control) (Amendment) (No. 2) Order 2003 (S.I. 2003 No. 1938)
- The Food (Hot Chilli and Hot Chilli Products) (Emergency Control) (England) Regulations 2003 (S.I. 2003 No. 1940)
- The Packaging (Essential Requirements) Regulations 2003 (S.I. 2003 No. 1941)
- The Representation of the People (Form of Canvass) (Northern Ireland) Regulations 2003 (S.I. 2003 No. 1942)
- The Child Benefit and Guardian's Allowance (Administration) (Amendment) Regulations 2003 (S.I. 2003 No. 1945)
- The Road Vehicles (Construction and Use) (Amendment) (No. 3) Regulations 2003 (S.I. 2003 No. 1946)
- The Land Registration Act 2002 (Transitional Provisions) Order 2003 (S.I. 2003 No. 1953)
- The Food (Pistachios from Iran) (Emergency Control) (England) Regulations 2003 (S.I. 2003 No. 1956)
- The Food (Figs, Hazelnuts and Pistachios from Turkey) (Emergency Control) (England) (No. 2) (Amendment) Regulations 2003 (S.I. 2003 No. 1957)
- The Food (Peanuts from China) (Emergency Control) (England) (No. 2) (Amendment) Regulations 2003 (S.I. 2003 No. 1958)
- The Motor Cycles Etc. (Single Vehicle Approval) Regulations 2003 (S.I. 2003 No. 1959)
- The Motor Cycles Etc. (Single Vehicle Approval) (Fees) Regulations 2003 (S.I. 2003 No. 1960)
- The Marriages (Approved Premises) (Amendment) Regulations 2003 (S.I. 2003 No. 1961)
- The School Governance (Collaboration) (England) Regulations 2003 (S.I. 2003 No. 1962)
- School Staffing (England) Regulations 2003 (S.I. 2003 No. 1963)
- The Education (Modification of Enactments Relating to Employment) (England) Order 2003 (S.I. 2003 No. 1964)
- The Federation of Schools (Community Schools, Community Special Schools, Voluntary Controlled Schools and Maintained Nursery Schools) (England) Regulations 2003 (S.I. 2003 No. 1965)
- The Disease Control (Wales) Order 2003 (S.I. 2003 No. 1966 (W.211))
- Gorchymyn Rheoli Clefydau (Cymru) 2003 (S.I. 2003 Rhif 1966 (Cy.211))
- The Animal Gatherings (Wales) Order 2003 (S.I. 2003 No. 1967 (W. 212))
- Gorchymyn Crynoadau Anifeiliaid (Cymru) 2003 (S.I. 2003 Rhif 1967 (Cy.212))
- The Transport of Animals (Cleansing and Disinfection) (Wales) (No. 3) Order 2003 (S.I. 2003 No. 1968 (W. 213))
- Gorchymyn Cludo Anifeiliaid (Glanhau a Diheintio) (Cymru) (Rhif 3) 2003 (S.I. 2003 Rhif 1968 (Cy.213))
- Education (School Performance Targets) (Amendment) (England) Regulations 2003 (S.I. 2003 No. 1970)
- The National Health Service (General Dental Services) (Amendment)(No.2) (Wales) Regulations 2003 (S.I. 2003 No. 1976 (W.215))
- Rheoliadau'r Gwasanaeth Iechyd Gwladol (Gwasanaethau Deintyddol Cyffredinol) (Diwygio) (Rhif 2) (Cymru) 2003 (S.I. 2003 Rhif 1976 (Cy.215))
- The Borough of Sefton (Electoral Changes) Order 2003 (S.I. 2003 No. 1977)
- The A27 Trunk Road (Cophall Roundabout) Order 2003 (S.I. 2003 No. 1978)
- The Borough of St Helens (Electoral Changes) Order 2003 (S.I. 2003 No. 1979)
- The Borough of Wirral (Electoral Changes) Order 2003 (S.I. 2003 No. 1980)
- The Walsall Primary Care Trust (Change of Name) Amendment Order 2003 (S.I. 2003 No. 1983)
- The Road Traffic (Permitted Parking Area and Special Parking Area) (Borough of Middlesbrough) Order 2003 (S.I. 2003 No. 1984)
- The Transport Act 1968 (Commencement No. 11) Order 2003 (S.I. 2003 No. 1985 (C. 81)])
- The Commonhold and Leasehold Reform Act 2002 (Commencement No. 2 and Savings) (England) Order 2003 (S.I. 2003 No. 1986 (C.82)])
- The Service Charges (Consultation Requirements) (England) Regulations 2003 (S.I. 2003 No. 1987)
- The Right to Manage (Prescribed Particulars and Forms) (England) Regulations 2003 (S.I. 2003 No. 1988)
- The Leasehold Reform (Enfranchisement and Extension) (Amendment) (England) Regulations 2003 (S.I. 2003 No. 1989)
- The Leasehold Reform (Collective Enfranchisement and Lease Renewal) (Amendment) (England) Regulations 2003 (S.I. 2003 No. 1990)
- The A1 Trunk Road (Denwick Interchange Slip Roads) Order 2003 (S.I. 2003 No. 1991)
- The Day Care (Application to Schools) (England) Regulations 2003 (S.I. 2003 No. 1992)
- The Public Interest Disclosure (Prescribed Persons) (Amendment) Order 2003 (S.I. 2003 No. 1993)
- The Education (Mandatory Awards) Regulations 2003 (S.I. 2003 No. 1994)
- The Child Minding and Day Care (Applications for Registration) (England) (Amendment) Regulations 2003 (S.I. 2003 No. 1995)
- The Day Care and Child Minding (National Standards) (England) Regulations 2003 (S.I. 2003 No. 1996)
- The Finance Act 2003, Schedule 22, Paragraph 3(1) (Appointed Day) Order 2003 (S.I. 2003 No. 1997 (C.83)])
- The Road Vehicles (Authorisation of Special Types) (General) Order 2003 (S.I. 2003 No. 1998)
- The Non-Domestic Rating (Alteration of Lists and Appeals) (Amendment) (England) Regulations 2003 (S.I. 2003 No. 1999)
- The Non-Domestic Rating (Transitional Period) (Amendment) (England) Regulations 2003 (S.I. 2003 No. 2000)

== 2001–2100 ==
- The Merchant Shipping (Safe Loading and Unloading of Bulk Carriers) Regulations 2003 (S.I. 2003 No. 2002)
- The Motor Vehicles (Driving Licences) (Amendment)(No. 4) Regulations 2003 (S.I. 2003 No. 2003)
- The Access to the Countryside (Dedication of Land) (England) Regulations 2003 (S.I. 2003 No. 2004)
- The Avian Influenza and Newcastle Disease (Biosecurity Guidance and Disease Control (Slaughter) Protocol) (England and Wales) Order 2003 (S.I. 2003 No. 2035)
- The Avian Influenza and Newcastle Disease (Contingency Planning) (England) Order 2003 (S.I. 2003 No. 2036)
- The Independent Schools (Employment of Teachers in Schools with a Religious Character) Regulations 2003 (S.I. 2003 No. 2037)
- The Teacher Training Agency (Additional Functions) (No. 2) (Amendment) Order 2003 (S.I. 2003 No.2038)
- The Education Act 2002 (School Teachers) (Consequential Amendments, etc.) (England) Regulations 2003 (S.I. 2003 No. 2039)
- The Land Registration (Proper Office) Order 2003 (S.I. 2003 No. 2040)
- The Tax Credits (Provision of Information) (Function Relating to Employment and Training) Regulations 2003 (S.I. 2003 No. 2041)
- The Mental Health (Correspondence of Patients, Patient Advocacy and Liaison Services) Regulations 2003 (S.I. 2003 No. 2042)
- The Protection of Children and Vulnerable Adults and Care Standards Tribunal (Amendment No. 3) Regulations 2003 (S.I. 2003 No. 2043)
- The Commission for Patient and Public Involvement in Health (Functions) Amendment (No. 2) Regulations 2003 (S.I. 2003 No. 2044)
- The Education Act 2002 (Modification and Transitional Provisions) (England) Regulations 2003 (S.I. 2003 No. 2045)
- The Town and Country Planning (General Development Procedure) (England) (Amendment) Order 2003 (S.I. 2003 No. 2047)
- The Planning (Listed Buildings and Conservation Areas) (England) (Amendment) Regulations 2003 (S.I. 2003 No. 2048)
- The School Companies (Amendment) Regulations 2003 (S.I. 2003 No. 2049)
- The Collective Investment Schemes (Miscellaneous Amendments) Regulations 2003 (S.I. 2003 No. 2066)
- The Financial Services and Markets Act 2000 (Promotion of Collective Investment Schemes etc.) (Exemptions) (Amendment) Order 2003 (S.I. 2003 No. 2067)
- The Local Authorities (Goods and Services) (Public Bodies) (England) (No.3) Order 2003 (S.I. 2003 No. 2069)
- The Education Act 2002 (Commencement No.7 and Transitional Provision) Order 2003 (S.I. 2003 No. 2071 (C. 84)])
- The Food (Peanuts from Egypt) (Emergency Control) (England) Regulations 2003 (S.I. 2003 No. 2074)
- The Meat Products (England) Regulations 2003 (S.I. 2003 No. 2075)
- The Capital Allowances (Environmentally Beneficial Plant and Machinery) Order 2003 (S.I. 2003 No. 2076)
- The Children Act 1989, Section 17(12) Regulations 2003 (S.I. 2003 No. 2077)
- The Stamp Duty Reserve Tax (virt-x Exchange Limited) (Amendment) Regulations 2003 (S.I. 2003 No. 2078)
- The Social Security Contributions (Intermediaries) (Amendment) Regulations 2003 (S.I. 2003 No. 2079)
- The Social Security Contributions (Intermediaries) (Northern Ireland) (Amendment) Regulations 2003 (S.I. 2003 No. 2080)
- The Insurance Companies (Calculation of Profits: Policy Holders' Tax) Regulations 2003 (S.I. 2003 No. 2082)
- The Social Security (Contributions) (Amendment No. 5) Regulations 2003 (S.I. 2003 No. 2085)
- The Land Registration Fee Order 2003 (S.I. 2003 No. 2092)
- The Enterprise Act 2002 (Commencement No. 4 and Transitional Provisions and Savings) Order 2003 (S.I. 2003 No. 2093 (C.85)])
- The Land Registry Trading Fund (Extension and Amendment) Order 2003 (S.I. 2003 No. 2094)
- The Insolvency Act 1986, Section 72A (Appointed Date) Order 2003 (S.I. 2003 No. 2095)
- The Enterprise Act 2002 (Insolvency) Order 2003 (S.I. 2003 No. 2096)
- The Insolvency Act 1986 (Prescribed Part) Order 2003 (S.I. 2003 No. 2097)
- Leasehold Valuation Tribunals (Fees)(England) Regulations 2003 (S.I. 2003 No. 2098)
- Leasehold Valuation Tribunals (Procedure) (England) Regulations 2003 (S.I. 2003 No. 2099)
- The Licensing Act 2003 (Commencement No. 2) Order 2003 (S.I. 2003 No. 2100 (C. 86))

== 2101–2200 ==
- The Child Benefit and Guardian's Allowance (Administration) (Amendment No. 2) Regulations 2003 (S.I. 2003 No. 2106)
- The Child Benefit and Guardian's Allowance (Administration) (Amendment No. 3) Regulations 2003 (S.I. 2003 No. 2107)
- The Enterprise Act 2002 (Consequential Amendments) (Prescribed Part) (Scotland) Order 2003 (S.I. 2003 No. 2108 (S. 7)])
- The Insolvency (Scotland) Regulations 2003 (S.I. 2003 No. 2109 (S. 8)])
- The Measuring Equipment (Liquid Fuel and Lubricants) (Amendment) Regulations 2003 (S.I. 2003 No. 2110)
- The Insolvency (Scotland) Amendment Rules 2003 (S.I. 2003 No. 2111 (S. 9)])
- The Civil Procedure (Amendment No. 4) Rules 2003 (S.I. 2003 No. 2113 (L. 33)])
- The Land Registration (Referral to the Adjudicator to HM Land Registry) Rules 2003 (S.I. 2003 No. 2114)
- The Financial Assistance for Environmental Purposes (England and Wales) Order 2003 (S.I. 2003 No. 2119)
- The RTM Companies (Memorandum and Articles of Association) (England) Regulations 2003 (S.I. 2003 No. 2120)
- The Air Quality Limit Values Regulations 2003 (S.I. 2003 No. 2121)
- The Patients' Forums (Membership and Procedure) Regulations 2003 (S.I. 2003 No. 2123)
- The Patients' Forums (Functions) Regulations 2003 (S.I. 2003 No. 2124)
- The Federation of Schools (Community Schools, Community Special Schools, Voluntary Controlled Schools and Maintained Nursery Schools) (England) (Amendment) Regulations 2003 (S.I. 2003 No. 2133)
- The Financial Services and Markets Act 2000 (Administration Orders Relating to Insurers) (Amendment) Order 2003 (S.I. 2003 No. 2134)
- Education (School Performance Information) (England) (Amendment) Regulations 2003 (S.I. 2003 No. 2135)
- The Education (Change of Category of Maintained Schools) (Amendment) (England) Regulations 2003 (S.I. 2003 No. 2136)
- The Distress for Rent (Amendment No. 2) Rules 2003 (S.I. 2003 No. 2141 (L. 34)])
- The Education (Induction Arrangements for School Teachers) (Consolidation) (England) (Amendment No. 2) Regulations 2003 (S.I. 2003 No. 2148)
- The Robert Jones and Agnes Hunt Orthopaedic and District Hospital National Health Service Trust (Establishment) Amendment Order 2003 (S.I. 2003 No. 2149)
- The University Hospitals of Leicester National Health Service Trust (Establishment) Amendment Order 2003 (S.I. 2003 No. 2150)
- The Agricultural Holdings (Units of Production) (England) Order 2003 (S.I. 2003 No. 2151)
- The Road Traffic (Permitted Parking Area and Special Parking Area) (County of Cumbria) (Borough of Copeland) Order 2003 (S.I. 2003 No. 2152)
- The Road Traffic (Permitted Parking Area and Special Parking Area) (City of Peterborough) Order 2003 (S.I. 2003 No. 2153)
- The Road Vehicles (Registration and Licensing) (Amendment) Regulations 2003 (S.I. 2003 No. 2154)
- The Communications Act 2003 (Consequential Amendments) Order 2003 (S.I. 2003 No. 2155)
- The Borough of Knowsley (Electoral Changes) Order 2003 (S.I. 2003 No. 2156)
- The International Fund for Agricultural Development (Fifth Replenishment) Order 2003 (S.I. 2003 No. 2157)
- The Bexley Primary Care Trust (Change of Name) and (Establishment) Amendment Order 2003 (S.I. 2003 No. 2168)
- The Education (School Teachers' Pay and Conditions) (No. 2) Order 2003 (S.I. 2003 No. 2169)
- The Tax Credits Act 2002 (Child Tax Credit) (Transitional Provisions) Order 2003 (S.I. 2003 No. 2170)
- The Adjudicator to Her Majesty's Land Registry (Practice and Procedure) Rules 2003 (S.I. 2003 No. 2171)
- The Finance Act 1995, Section 127(12) (Designated Transactions) Regulations 2003 (S.I. 2003 No. 2172)
- The Finance Act 2003, Schedule 26, Paragraph 3(3) (Designated Transactions) Regulations 2003 (S.I. 2003 No. 2173)
- The Financial Services and Markets Act 2000 (Disclosure of Confidential Information) (Amendment) (No. 2) Regulations 2003 (S.I. 2003 No. 2174)
- The State Pension Credit (Amendment) (Northern Ireland) Regulations 2003 (S.I. 2003 No. 2175)
- The Food Protection (Emergency Prohibitions) (Scallops) (England) (Revocation) Order 2003 (S.I. 2003 No. 2185)
- The M6 Toll (Collection of Tolls) Regulations 2003 (S.I. 2003 No. 2186)
- The M6 Toll Wide Load Routes (Speed Limit) Regulations 2003 (S.I. 2003 No. 2187)
- The M6 Toll (Speed Limit) Regulations 2003 (S.I. 2003 No. 2188)
- The Social Security (Industrial Injuries) (Prescribed Diseases) Amendment (No.2) Regulations 2003 (S.I. 2003 No. 2190)
- The Social Fund Winter Fuel Payment (Amendment) (No.2) Regulations 2003 (S.I. 2003 No. 2192)

== 2201–2300 ==
- The A1 Trunk Road (Long Bennington (Southbound Slip Road) and Detrunking) Order 2003 (S.I. 2003 No. 2206)
- The A6 Trunk Road (Bedford to the A45) (Detrunking) Order 2003 (S.I. 2003 No. 2207)
- The Crime Prevention (Designated Areas) Order 2003 (S.I. 2003 No. 2208)
- The Terrorism (United Nations Measures) Order 2001 (Amendment No. 2) Regulations 2003 (S.I. 2003 No. 2209)
- The Non-Domestic Rating (Collection and Enforcement) (Local Lists) (Amendment) (England) Regulations 2003 (S.I. 2003 No. 2210)
- The Council Tax (Administration and Enforcement) (Amendment) (No. 2) (England) Regulations 2003 (S.I. 2003 No. 2211)
- The Honey (England) Regulations 2003 (S.I. 2003 No. 2243)
- The Health and Social Care Act 2001 (Commencement No. 13) (England) Order 2003 (S.I. 2003 No. 2245 (C. 87)])
- The National Health Service Reform and Health Care Professions Act 2002 (Commencement No. 6) Order 2003 (S.I. 2003 No. 2246 (C. 88)])
- The Gaming Duty (Amendment) Regulations 2003 (S.I. 2003 No. 2247)
- The Local Government Pension Scheme (Amendment) Regulations 2003 (S.I. 2003 No. 2249)
- The Land Reform (Scotland) Act 2003 (Directions for the Purposes of Defence or National Security) Order 2003 (S.I. 2003 No. 2250 (S. 10)])
- The Mental Health Review Tribunals (Regions) Order 2003 (S.I. 2003 No. 2251)
- The Magistrates' Courts Committees (Constitution) (Amendment) Regulations 2003 (S.I. 2003 No. 2252)
- The Price Marking (Food and Drink Services) Order 2003 (S.I. 2003 No. 2253)
- The Food (Brazil Nuts) (Emergency Control) (Wales) Regulations 2003 (S.I. 2003 No. 2254 (W.224))
- Rheoliadau Bwyd (Cnau Brasil) (Rheolaeth Frys) (Cymru) 2003 (S.I. 2003 Rhif 2254 (Cy.224))
- The Motor Vehicles (Type Approval and Approval Marks) (Fees) (Amendment) Regulations 2003 (S.I. 2003 No. 2258)
- The Social Security (Attendance Allowance and Disability Living Allowance) (Amendment) Regulations 2003 (S.I. 2003 No. 2259)
- The Commons Registration (General) (Amendment) (England) Regulations 2003 (S.I. 2003 No. 2260)
- The Sheep Annual Premium and Suckler Cow Premium Quotas Regulations 2003 (S.I. 2003 No. 2261)
- The Social Security (Incapacity) (Miscellaneous Amendments) Regulations 2003 (S.I. 2003 No. 2262)
- The Home Energy Efficiency Scheme (England) (Amendment) (No. 2) Regulations 2003 (S.I. 2003 No. 2263)
- The Feeding Stuffs (Enforcement) (Amendment) Regulations 2003 (S.I. 2003 No. 2264)
- The Criminal Justice Act 1988 (Reviews of Sentencing) Order 2003 (S.I. 2003 No. 2267)
- The Armed Forces Act 2001 (Commencement No. 3) Order 2003 (S.I. 2003 No. 2268 (C. 89)])
- The Leasehold Valuation Tribunals (Service Charges, Insurance or Appointment of Managers Applications) (Revocation and Saving) (England) Order 2003 (S.I. 2003 No. 2269)
- The Leasehold Valuation Tribunals (Fees) (Revocation and Saving) (England) Order 2003 (S.I. 2003 No. 2270)
- The Armed Forces (Review of Search and Seizure) Order 2003 (S.I. 2003 No. 2272)
- The Armed Forces (Entry, Search and Seizure) Order 2003 (S.I. 2003 No. 2273)
- The State Pension Credit (Transitional and Miscellaneous Provisions) Amendment Regulations 2003 (S.I. 2003 No. 2274)
- The Housing Benefit and Council Tax Benefit (State Pension Credit and Miscellaneous Amendments) Regulations 2003 (S.I. 2003 No. 2275)
- The Delayed Discharges (Mental Health Care) (England) Order 2003 (S.I. 2003 No. 2276)
- The Delayed Discharges (England) Regulations 2003 (S.I. 2003 No. 2277)
- The Scottish Parliamentary Standards Commissioner Act 2002 (Power to Call for Witnesses and Documents) (England, Wales and Northern Ireland) Order 2003 (S.I. 2003 No. 2278 (S. 11)])
- The Social Security (Miscellaneous Amendments) (No.2) Regulations 2003 (S.I. 2003 No. 2279)
- The Community Care (Delayed Discharges etc.) Act 2003 (Commencement No.1) (England) Order 2003 (S.I. 2003 No. 2280 (C. 90)])
- The Land Registration (Acting Chief Land Registrar) Regulations 2003 (S.I. 2003 No. 2281)
- The Food (Pistachios from Iran) (Emergency Control) (Wales) (No.2) Regulations 2003 (S.I. 2003 No. 2288 (W.227))
- Rheoliadau Bwyd (Cnau Pistasio o Iran) (Rheolaeth Frys) (Cymru) (Rhif 2) 2003 (S.I. 2003 Rhif 2288 (Cy.227))
- The Food (Figs, Hazelnuts and Pistachios from Turkey) (Emergency Control) (Wales) (Amendment) Regulations 2003 (S.I. 2003 No. 2292 (W.228))
- Rheoliadau Bwyd (Ffigys, Cnau Cyll a Chnau Pistasio o Dwrci) (Rheolaeth Frys) (Cymru) (Diwygio) 2003 (S.I. 2003 Rhif 2292 (Cy.228))
- The Food (Peanuts from China) (Emergency Control) (Amendment) (Wales) Regulations 2003 (S.I. 2003 No. 2299 (W.229))
- Rheoliadau Bwyd (Prysgnau o Tsieina) (Rheolaeth Frys) (Diwygio) (Cymru) 2003 (S.I. 2003 Rhif 2299 (Cy.229))

== 2301–2400 ==
- The Royal Air Force Terms of Service (Amendment) Regulations 2003 (S.I. 2003 No. 2305)
- The Channel Tunnel Rail Link (Nomination) (Amendment) Order 2003 (S.I. 2003 No. 2306)
- The Enrichment Technology Company Limited (Designation) Order 2003 (S.I. 2003 No. 2310)
- The Urenco Enrichment Company Limited (Designation) Order 2003 (S.I. 2003 No. 2311)
- The Enrichment Technology UK Limited (Designation) Order 2003 (S.I. 2003 No. 2312)
- The Landfill Tax (Amendment) (No. 2) Regulations 2003 (S.I. 2003 No. 2313)
- The Religious Character of Schools (Designation Procedure) (Independent Schools) (England) Regulations 2003 (S.I. 2003 No. 2314)
- The Police and Criminal Evidence Act 1984 (Codes of Practice) (Armed Forces) Order 2003 (S.I. 2003 No. 2315)
- The Goods Infringing Intellectual Property Rights (Customs) Regulations 2003 (S.I. 2003 No. 2316)
- The Medicines (Child Safety) Regulations 2003 (S.I. 2003 No. 2317)
- The Value Added Tax (Amendment) (No. 5) Regulations 2003 (S.I. 2003 No. 2318)
- The Tonnage Tax (Training Requirement) (Amendment) Regulations 2003 (S.I. 2003 No. 2320)
- The Medicines for Human Use (Fees and Miscellaneous Amendments) Regulations 2003 (S.I. 2003 No. 2321)
- The National Health Service Pension Scheme (Amendment) Regulations 2003 (S.I. 2003 No. 2322)
- The Care Standards Act 2000 (Domiciliary Care Agencies and Nurses Agencies) (Amendment) (England) Regulations 2003 (S.I. 2003 No. 2323)
- The Social Security (Third Party Deductions and Miscellaneous Amendments) Regulations 2003 (S.I. 2003 No. 2325)
- The Road Traffic (Permitted Parking Area and Special Parking Area) (County of Hertfordshire) (Borough of Dacorum) Order 2003 (S.I. 2003 No. 2326)
- The Kimberley Process (Fees) Regulations 2003 (S.I. 2003 No. 2327)
- The Smoke Control Areas (Exempted Fireplaces) (England) Order 2003 (S.I. 2003 No. 2328)
- The Classical Swine Fever (England) Order 2003 (S.I. 2003 No. 2329)
- The Enterprise Act 2002 (Transitional Provisions) (Insolvency) Order 2003 (S.I. 2003 No. 2332)
- The Road Traffic (Permitted Parking Area and Special Parking Area) (County of Cumbria) (Borough of Allerdale) Order 2003 (S.I. 2003 No. 2334)
- The Road Vehicles (Registration and Licensing) (Amendment) (No. 2) Regulations 2003 (S.I. 2003 No. 2335)
- The Road Traffic (Permitted Parking Area and Special Parking Area) (County of Hampshire) (Borough of Test Valley) Order 2003 (S.I. 2003 No. 2336)
- The Food (Star Anise from Third Countries) (Emergency Control) (England) (Revocation) Order 2003 (S.I. 2003 No. 2338)
- The Taxation of Benefits under Government Pilot Schemes (Return to Work Credit and Employment Retention and Advancement Schemes) Order 2003 (S.I. 2003 No. 2339)
- The Social Security (Contributions) (Amendment No. 6) Regulations 2003 (S.I. 2003 No. 2340)
- The Land Registration (Acting Adjudicator) Regulations 2003 (S.I. 2003 No. 2342)
- The National Assistance (Assessment of Resources) (Amendment) (No. 2) (England) Regulations 2003 (S.I. 2003 No. 2343)
- The West Midlands Ambulance Service National Health Service Trust (Establishment) Amendment Order 2003 (S.I. 2003 No. 2344)
- The Sandwell and West Birmingham Hospitals National Health Service Trust (Establishment) Amendment Order 2003 (S.I. 2003 No. 2345)
- The Shrewsbury and Telford Hospital National Health Service Trust (Establishment) and the Princess Royal Hospital National Health Service Trust and the Royal Shrewsbury Hospitals National Health Service Trust (Dissolution) Order 2003 (S.I. 2003 No. 2346)
- The Commonhold and Leasehold Reform Act 2002 (Commencement No. 3) Order 2003 (S.I. 2003 No. 2377 (C. 91)])
- The Criminal Defence Service (General) (No. 2) (Amendment No. 2) Regulations 2003 (S.I. 2003 No. 2378)
- The Income Support (General) Amendment Regulations 2003 (S.I. 2003 No. 2379)
- The Electricity (Exemption from the Requirement for a Generation Licence) (England and Wales) Order 2003 (S.I. 2003 No. 2380)
- The National Health Service (Optical Charges and Payments) and (General Ophthalmic Services) Amendment (No. 2) Regulations 2003 (S.I. 2003 No. 2381)
- The National Health Service (Travel Expenses and Remission of Charges) Regulations 2003 (S.I. 2003 No. 2382)
- The Police and Criminal Evidence Act 1984 (Remote Reviews of Detention) (Specified Police Stations) Regulations 2003 (S.I. 2003 No. 2397)
- The Rent Officers (Housing Benefit Functions) (Local Housing Allowance) Amendment Order 2003 (S.I. 2003 No. 2398)
- The Housing Benefit (General) (Local Housing Allowance) Amendment Regulations 2003 (S.I. 2003 No. 2399)

== 2401–2500 ==
- The Rail Vehicle Accessibility (Bristol Harbour Railway Vehicle Number DB978121) Exemption Order 2003 (S.I. 2003 No. 2408)
- The Social Security (Categorisation of Earners) (Amendment No. 2) Regulations 2003 (S.I. 2003 No. 2420)
- The Social Security (Categorisation of Earners) (Amendment No. 2) (Northern Ireland) Regulations 2003 (S.I. 2003 No. 2421)
- The A259 Trunk Road, (Brenzett to M20 Junction 13, Folkestone) (Detrunking) Order 2003 (S.I. 2003 No. 2423)
- The A292 (Hythe Road, Ashford) (Trunking) Order 2003 (S.I. 2003 No. 2424)
- The A2070 (Brenzett to M20 Junction 10, Ashford) and B2067 (Ashford Road, Link Road) (Trunking) Order 2003 (S.I. 2003 No. 2425)
- Privacy and Electronic Communications (EC Directive) Regulations 2003 (S.I. 2003 No. 2426)
- The Cambridgeshire and Peterborough Mental Health Partnership National Health Service Trust (Establishment) and the Lifespan Health Care Cambridge National Health Service Trust and the North West Anglia Health Care National Health Service Trust (Dissolution) Amendment Order 2003 (S.I. 2003 No. 2427)
- The Motor Vehicles (EC Type Approval) (Amendment) (No. 2) Regulations 2003 (S.I. 2003 No. 2428)
- The Misuse of Drugs (Amendment) (No. 3)Regulations 2003 (S.I. 2003 No. 2429)
- The Terrorism (United Nations Measures) Order 2001 (Amendment No. 3) Regulations 2003 (S.I. 2003 No. 2430)
- The Land Registration Act 2002 (Transitional Provisions) (No 2) Order 2003 (S.I. 2003 No. 2431)
- The Royal Cornwall Hospitals and West Cornwall Hospital National Health Service Trust (Establishment) Amendment Order 2003 (S.I. 2003 No. 2434)
- The Protection from Eviction (Excluded Licences) (Royal British Legion Industries Ltd) (England) Order 2003 (S.I. 2003 No. 2436)
- The Local Government (Gratuities) (Members of County Councils and County Borough Councils) (Wales) Regulations 2003 (S.I. 2003 No. 2437)
- The Employment Zones Regulations 2003 (S.I. 2003 No. 2438)
- The Social Security (Incapacity Benefit Work-focused Interviews) Regulations 2003 (S.I. 2003 No. 2439)
- The Road Traffic (Permitted Parking Area and Special Parking Area) (County of Essex) (District of Harlow) Order 2003 (S.I. 2003 No. 2440)
- The Park College (Dissolution) Order 2003 (S.I. 2003 No. 2442)
- The Immigration Employment Document (Fees) (Amendment No. 2) Regulations 2003 (S.I. 2003 No. 2447)
- The Education (Information About Post-16 Individual Pupils) (Wales) Regulations 2003 (S.I. 2003 No. 2453 (W.237))
- Rheoliadau Addysg (Gwybodaeth am Ddisgyblion Ôl-16 Unigol) (Cymru) 2003 (S.I. 2003 Rhif 2453 (Cy.237))
- The Weighing Equipment (Automatic Rail-weighbridges) Regulations 2003 (S.I. 2003 No. 2454)
- The Food (Hot Chilli and Hot Chilli Products) (Emergency Control) (Wales) Regulations 2003 (S.I. 2003 No. 2455 (W.238))
- Rheoliadau Bwyd (Tsilis Poeth a Chynhyrchion Tsilis Poeth) (Rheolaeth Frys) (Cymru) 2003 (S.I. 2003 Rhif 2455 (Cy.238))
- The Classical Swine Fever (Wales) Order 2003 (S.I. 2003 No. 2456 (W.239))
- Gorchymyn Clwy Clasurol y Moch (Cymru) 2003 (S.I. 2003 Rhif 2456 (Cy.239))
- The Management of Health and Safety at Work and Fire Precautions (Workplace) (Amendment) Regulations 2003 (S.I. 2003 No. 2457)
- The Education (Teachers' Qualifications and Health Standards) (Amendment No. 2) (Wales) Regulations 2003 (S.I. 2003 No. 2458 (W.240))
- Rheoliadau Addysg (Cymwysterau Athrawon a Safonau Iechyd) (Diwygiad Rhif 2) (Cymru) 2003 (S.I. 2003 Rhif 2458 (Cy.240))
- The A1 Trunk Road (North Brunton Interchange Slip Road) Order 2003 (S.I. 2003 No. 2460)
- The Registered Health Care Profession (Designation) Order 2003 (S.I. 2003 No. 2461)
- The Registered Health Care Profession (Designation No. 2) Order 2003 (S.I. 2003 No. 2462)
- The Police and Criminal Evidence Act 1984 (Visual Recording of Interviews) (Certain Police Areas) (Revocation) Order 2003 (S.I. 2003 No. 2463)
- The Income Tax (Employments) (Amendment) Regulations 2003 (S.I. 2003 No. 2494)
- The Income Tax (Incentive Payments for Voluntary Electronic Communication of PAYE Returns) Regulations 2003 (S.I. 2003 No. 2495)
- The Protection of Wrecks (RMS Titanic) Order 2003 (S.I. 2003 No. 2496)
- The Finance Act 2003, Section 168 (Appointed Day) Order 2003 (S.I. 2003 No. 2497 (C.92)])
- Copyright and Related Rights Regulations 2003 (S.I. 2003 No. 2498)
- The Copyright (Visually Impaired Persons) Act 2002 (Commencement) Order 2003 (S.I. 2003 No. 2499 (C. 93)])
- The Electronic Commerce (EC Directive) (Extension) (No. 2) Regulations 2003 (S.I. 2003 No. 2500)

== 2501–2600 ==
- The Copyright and Rights in Databases (Amendment) Regulations 2003 (S.I. 2003 No. 2501)
- The Local Land Charges (Amendment) Rules 2003 (S.I. 2003 No. 2502)
- The Bingo Duty Regulations 2003 (S.I. 2003 No. 2503)
- The Housing Renewal Grants (Amendment) (England) Regulations 2003 (S.I. 2003 No. 2504)
- The City of Liverpool (Electoral Changes) Order 2003 (S.I. 2003 No. 2505)
- The Borough of Stockton-on-Tees (Electoral Changes) Order 2003 (S.I. 2003 No. 2506)
- The City of Coventry (Electoral Changes) Order 2003 (S.I. 2003 No. 2507)
- The Borough of Solihull (Electoral Changes) Order 2003 (S.I. 2003 No. 2508)
- The City of Wolverhampton (Electoral Changes) Order 2003 (S.I. 2003 No. 2509)
- The Borough of Sandwell (Electoral Changes) Order 2003 (S.I. 2003 No. 2510)
- The Borough of Walsall (Electoral Changes) Order 2003 (S.I. 2003 No. 2511)
- The Environmental Protection (Restriction on Use of Lead Shot) (England) (Amendment) Regulations 2003 (S.I. 2003 No. 2512)
- The Fal and Helford (Prohibition of Scallop Dredging) Order 2003 (S.I. 2003 No. 2513)
- The Housing Benefit and Council Tax Benefit (State Pension Credit and Miscellaneous Amendments) (Amendment) Regulations 2003 (S.I. 2003 No. 2526)
- The Nurses Agencies (Wales) Regulations 2003 (S.I. 2003 No. 2527 (W.242))
- Rheoliadau Asiantaethau Nyrsys (Cymru) 2003 (S.I. 2003 Rhif 2527 (Cy.242))
- The Care Standards Act 2000 (Commencement No.12) (Wales) Order 2003 (S.I. 2003 No. 2528 (W.243) (C.95))
- Gorchymyn Deddf Safonau Gofal 2000 (Cychwyn Rhif 12) (Cymru) 2003 (S.I. 2003 Rhif 2528 (Cy.243) (C.95))
- The Oil and Fibre Plant Seeds (Amendment) (Wales) Regulations 2003 (S.I. 2003 No. 2529 (W.244))
- Rheoliadau Hadau Planhigion Olew a Ffibr (Diwygio) (Cymru) 2003 (S.I. 2003 Rhif 2529 (Cy.244))
- The National Assistance (Assessment of Resources)(Amendment No. 2)(Wales) Regulations 2003 (S.I. 2003 No. 2530 (W.245))
- Rheoliadau Cymorth Gwladol (Asesu Adnoddau) (Diwygiad Rhif 2) (Cymru) 2003 (S.I. 2003 Rhif 2530 (Cy.245))
- The Disability Discrimination (Prescribed Periods for Accessibility Strategies and Plans for Schools) (Wales) Regulations 2003 (S.I. 2003 No. 2531 (W.246))
- Rheoliadau Gwahaniaethu ar Sail Anabledd (Cyfnodau Rhagnodedig ar gyfer Strategaethau a Chynlluniau Hygyrchedd ar gyfer Ysgolion) (Cymru) 2003 (S.I. 2003 Rhif 2531 (Cy.246))
- The Special Educational Needs and Disability Act 2001 (Commencement No. 2) (Wales) Order 2003 (S.I. 2003 No. 2532 (W.247) (C.94))
- Gorchymyn Deddf Anghenion Addysgol Arbennig ac Anabledd 2001 (Cychwyn Rhif 2) (Cymru) 2003 (S.I. 2003 Rhif 2532 (Cy.247) (C.94))
- The Designation of Schools having a Religious Character (England) (No. 2) Order 2003 (S.I. 2003 No. 2552)
- The Electronic Communications Code (Conditions and Restrictions) Regulations 2003 (S.I. 2003 No. 2553)
- The Dissolution of the Independent Broadcasting Authority Order 2003 (S.I. 2003 No. 2554)
- The Adoption Agencies (Amendment) Regulations 2003 (S.I. 2003 No. 2555)
- The Port of London Authority Harbour Revision Order 2003 (S.I. 2003 No. 2556)
- The Local Authorities (Goods and Services) (Public Bodies) (England) (No. 4) Order 2003 (S.I. 2003 No. 2558)
- The Merchant Shipping (Oil Pollution Compensation Limits) Order 2003 (S.I. 2003 No. 2559)
- The National Health Service (Travelling Expenses and Remission of Charges) (Amendment) (No.2) (Wales) Regulations 2003 (S.I. 2003 No. 2561 (W.250))
- Rheoliadau'r Gwasanaeth Iechyd Gwladol (Treuliau Teithio a Pheidio â Chodi Tâl) (Diwygio) (Rhif 2) (Cymru) 2003 (S.I. 2003 Rhif 2561 (Cy.250))
- The Electricity (Guarantees of Origin of Electricity Produced from Renewable Energy Sources) Regulations 2003 (S.I. 2003 No. 2562)
- The Pipelines Safety (Amendment) Regulations 2003 (S.I. 2003 No. 2563)
- The Teacher Training Agency (Additional Functions) (No. 3) (England) Order 2003 (S.I. 2003 No. 2564)
- The Access to Justice Act 1999 (Commencement No. 11) Order 2003 (S.I. 2003 No. 2571 (C.96)])
- The Insurance Companies (Taxation of Reinsurance Business) (Amendment No. 2) Regulations 2003 (S.I. 2003 No. 2573)
- The Teignmouth Harbour Revision Order 2003 (S.I. 2003 No. 2574)
- The Olive Oil (Marketing Standards) Regulations 2003 (S.I. 2003 No. 2577)
- The Timeshare (Cancellation Information) Order 2003 (S.I. 2003 No. 2579)
- The Enterprise Act 2002 (Part 9 Restrictions on Disclosure of Information) (Amendment and Specification) (No. 2) Order 2003 (S.I. 2003 No. 2580)
- The Double Taxation Relief (Manufactured Overseas Dividends) (Revocation) Regulations 2003 (S.I. 2003 No. 2581)
- The Income Tax (Manufactured Overseas Dividends) (Amendment) Regulations 2003 (S.I. 2003 No. 2582)
- The Judicial Pensions and Retirement Act 1993 (Addition of Qualifying Judicial Offices) (No. 2) Order 2003 (S.I. 2003 No. 2589)
- The Community Legal Service (Funding) (Counsel in Family Proceedings) (Amendment) Order 2003 (S.I. 2003 No. 2590)
- The Pesticides (Maximum Residue Levels in Crops, Food and Feeding Stuffs) (England and Wales) (Amendment) (No.2) Regulations 2003 (S.I. 2003 No. 2591)
- The Northern Ireland Act 2000 (Modification) (No. 2) Order 2003 (S.I. 2003 No. 2592)
- The Police Reform Act 2002 (Commencement No. 5) Order 2003 (S.I. 2003 No. 2593 (C. 98)])
- The Police (Amendment) Regulations 2003 (S.I. 2003 No. 2594)
- The Police (Promotion) (Amendment) Regulations 2003 (S.I. 2003 No. 2595)
- The Police (Conduct) (Senior Officers) (Amendment) Regulations 2003 (S.I. 2003 No. 2596)
- The Police Appeals Tribunals (Amendment) Rules 2003 (S.I. 2003 No. 2597)
- The National Crime Squad (Senior Police Members) (Appeals) (Revocation) Order 2003 (S.I. 2003 No. 2598)
- The Police (Conduct) (Amendment) Regulations 2003 (S.I. 2003 No. 2599)
- The Police (Efficiency) (Amendment No. 2) Regulations 2003 (S.I. 2003 No. 2600)

== 2601–2700 ==
- The National Crime Squad (Dispensation from Requirement to Investigate Complaints) Regulations 2003 (S.I. 2003 No. 2601)
- The Police (Complaints) (General) (Amendment) Regulations 2003 (S.I. 2003 No. 2602)
- The Freedom of Information Act 2000 (Commencement No. 3) Order 2003 (S.I. 2003 No. 2603 (C.97)])
- The Council Tax and Non-Domestic Rating (Electronic Communications) (England) Order 2003 (S.I. 2003 No. 2604)
- The Social Fund Cold Weather Payments (General) Amendment Regulations 2003 (S.I. 2003 No. 2605)
- The Council Tax and Non-Domestic Rating (Demand Notices) (England) Regulations 2003 (S.I. 2003 No. 2613)
- The Democratic Republic of the Congo (United Nations Sanctions) (Isle of Man) Order 2003 (S.I. 2003 No. 2614)
- The M62 Motorway (City of Liverpool) (Speed Limit) Regulations 2003 (S.I. 2003 No. 2615)
- The Democratic Republic of the Congo (United Nations Sanctions) (Channel Islands) Order 2003 (S.I. 2003 No. 2616)
- The Scotland Act 1998 (Transfer of Functions to the Scottish Ministers etc.) (No. 2) Order 2003 (S.I. 2003 No. 2617 (S. 12)])
- The Reciprocal Enforcement of Foreign Judgments (Israel) (Amendment) Order 2003 (S.I. 2003 No. 2618)
- The Double Taxation Relief (Taxes on Income) (Canada) Order 2003 (S.I. 2003 No. 2619)
- The Double Taxation Relief (Taxes on Income) (Mauritius) Order 2003 (S.I. 2003 No. 2620)
- The Vienna Document 1999 (Privileges and Immunities) Order 2003 (S.I. 2003 No. 2621)
- The Finance Act 2002, section 126, (Appointed Day) Order 2003 (S.I. 2003 No. 2622 (C. 99)])
- The Pensions Increase (Pension Schemes for David Calvert-Smith) Regulations 2003 (S.I. 2003 No. 2623)
- The National Health Service (Amendments concerning Supplementary and Independent Nurse Prescribing) (Wales) Regulations 2003 (S.I. 2003 No. 2624 (W.252))
- Rheoliadau'r Gwasanaeth Iechyd Gwladol (Diwygiadau ynghylch Rhagnodi gan Nyrsys Atodol ac Annibynnol) (Cymru) 2003 (S.I. 2003 Rhif 2624 (Cy.252))
- The Immigration Employment Document (Fees) (Amendment No.3) Regulations 2003 (S.I. 2003 No. 2626)
- The Democratic Republic of the Congo (Restrictive Measures) (Overseas Territories) Order 2003 (S.I. 2003 No. 2627)
- The Immigration (Passenger Transit Visa) (Amendment No. 2) Order 2003 (S.I. 2003 No. 2628)
- The Export Control Act 2002 (Commencement & Transitional Provisions) Order 2003 (S.I. 2003 No. 2629 (C. 100)])
- European Convention on Cinematographic Co-production (Amendment) (No. 2) Order 2003 (S.I. 2003 No. 2630)
- The General Betting Duty (Amendment) Regulations 2003 (S.I. 2003 No. 2631)
- The Pigs (Records, Identification and Movement) Order 2003 (S.I. 2003 No. 2632)
- The Climate Change Levy (General) (Amendment) (No. 2) Regulations 2003 (S.I. 2003 No. 2633)
- The Housing Benefit and Council Tax Benefit (Miscellaneous Amendments) Regulations 2003 (S.I. 2003 No. 2634)
- The End-of-Life Vehicles Regulations 2003 (S.I. 2003 No. 2635)
- The Education (Funding for Teacher Training) Designation (No.2) Order 2003 (S.I. 2003 No. 2636)
- The Education (School Teachers' Pay and Conditions) (No.3) Order 2003 (S.I. 2003 No. 2640)
- The Insurance Companies (Taxation of Reinsurance Business) (Amendment No. 3) Regulations 2003 (S.I. 2003 No. 2642)
- The National Health Service (Personal Medical Services) (Services List) and the (General Medical Services Supplementary List) and (General Medical Services) Amendment Regulations 2003 (S.I. 2003 No. 2644)
- The Education (Extension of Careers Education) (England) Regulations 2003 (S.I. 2003 No. 2645)
- The Northern Ireland (Monitoring Commission etc.) Act 2003 (Commencement No. 1) Order 2003 (S.I. 2003 No. 2646 (c 101 )])
- The Food (Provisions relating to Labelling) (England) Regulations 2003 (S.I. 2003 No. 2647)
- The Brent Primary Care Trust (Change of Name) Amendment Order 2003 (S.I. 2003 No. 2649)
- The Creosote (Prohibition on Use and Marketing)(No. 2) Amendment Regulations 2003 (S.I. 2003 No. 2650)
- The Health (Wales) Act 2003 (Commencement No. 1) Order 2003 (S.I. 2003 No. 2660 (W.256)(C.102))
- Gorchymyn Deddf Iechyd (Cymru) 2003 (Cychwyn Rhif 1) 2003 (S.I. 2003 Rhif 2660 (Cy.256)(C.102))
- The Food (Star Anise from Third Countries) (Emergency Control) (Wales) (Revocation) Order 2003 (S.I. 2003 No. 2661 (W.257))
- Gorchymyn Bwyd (Coed Anis o Drydydd Gwledydd) (Rheolaeth Frys) (Cymru) (Dirymu) 2003 (S.I. 2003 Rhif 2661 (Cy.257))
- The Portsmouth City Primary Care Trust (Change of Name) Amendment Order 2003 (S.I. 2003 No. 2662)
- The City and Hackney Primary Care Trust (Change of Name) Amendment Order 2003 (S.I. 2003 No. 2663)
- The Bournemouth Primary Care Trust (Change of Name) Amendment Order 2003 (S.I. 2003 No. 2664)
- The Fishing Vessels (Decommissioning) Scheme 2003 (S.I. 2003 No. 2669)
- The Local Authorities (Allowances for Members of County and County Borough Councils) (Past Service Awards) (Wales) Regulations 2003 (S.I. 2003 No. 2676 (W.258))
- Rheoliadau Awdurdodau Lleol (Lwfansau i Aelodau Cynghorau Sir a Chynghorau Bwrdeistref Sirol) (Dyfarndaliadau am Wasanaeth a Roddwyd) (Cymru) 2003 (S.I. 2003 Rhif 2676 (Cy.258))
- The Road Traffic (Permitted Parking Area and Special Parking Area) (Borough of Blackpool) Order 2003 (S.I. 2003 No. 2677)
- The Co-operatives and Community Benefit Societies Act 2003 (Commencement No. 1) Order 2003 (S.I. 2003 No. 2678 (C. 103)])
- The Newport (South Wales) Harbour Revision (Constitution) Order 2003 (S.I. 2003 No. 2679)
- The Railways and Transport Safety Act 2003 (Commencement No. 1) Order 2003 (S.I. 2003 No. 2681 (c. 104)])
- The Income Tax (Pay As You Earn) Regulations 2003 (S.I. 2003 No. 2682)
- The Building (Amendment) Regulations 2003 (S.I. 2003 No. 2692)
- The Income Support (General) (Standard Interest Rate Amendment) Regulations 2003 (S.I. 2003 No. 2693)
- Education (Revocation of Spent Provisions) (England) Regulations 2003 (S.I. 2003 No. 2694)
- The Road Vehicles (Construction and Use) (Amendment) (No. 4) Regulations 2003 (S.I. 2003 No. 2695)
- The Northern Ireland Assembly (Elections and Periodsof Suspension) Act 2003 (Consequential Modifications) Order 2003 (S.I. 2003 No. 2696)
- The Northern Ireland (Date of Next Assembly Poll)Order 2003 (S.I. 2003 No. 2697)

== 2701–2800 ==
- The Contracting Out (Local Education Authority Functions) (England) (Amendment) Order 2003 (S.I. 2003 No. 2704)
- Housing Renewal Grants (Prescribed Form and Particulars) (Amendment) (England) Regulations 2003 (S.I. 2003 No. 2707)
- The Child Minding and Day Care (Amendment) (Wales) Regulations 2003 (S.I. 2003 No. 2708 (W.259))
- Rheoliadau Gwarchod Plant a Gofal Dydd (Diwygio) (Cymru) 2003 (S.I. 2003 Rhif 2708 (Cy.259))
- The Registration of Social Care and Independent Health Care (Amendment) (Wales) Regulations 2003 (S.I. 2003 No. 2709 (W.260))
- Rheoliadau Cofrestru Gofal Cymdeithasol a Gofal Iechyd Annibynnol (Diwygio) (Cymru) 2003 (S.I. 2003 Rhif 2709 (Cy.260))
- The Private Security Industry Act 2001 (Commencement No. 2) Order 2003 (S.I. 2003 No. 2710 (c. 105)])
- The Road Traffic (Permitted Parking Area and Special Parking Area) (Metropolitan Borough of Wirral) Order 2003 (S.I. 2003 No. 2711)
- The Electronic Communications (Networks and Services) (Penalties) (Rules for Calculation of Turnover) Order 2003 (S.I. 2003 No. 2712)
- The Access to the Countryside (Exclusions and Restrictions) (England) Regulations 2003 (S.I. 2003 No. 2713)
- The Non-resident Insurance Companies Regulations 2003 (S.I. 2003 No. 2714)
- The Transfer of Undertakings (Protection of Employment) (Transfer to OFCOM) Regulations 2003 (S.I. 2003 No. 2715)
- The Police Pensions (Amendment) (No. 3) Regulations 2003 (S.I. 2003 No. 2716)
- The Police Pensions (Additional Voluntary Contributions) (Amendment) Regulations 2003 (S.I. 2003 No. 2717)
- The Petroleum Revenue Tax (Electronic Communications) Regulations 2003 (S.I. 2003 No. 2718)
- The Local Government Pension Scheme (Management and Investment of Funds) (Amendment) Regulations 2003 (S.I. 2003 No. 2719)
- The A14 Trunk Road (Rookery Crossroads Grade Separated Junction Slip Roads) Order 2003 (S.I. 2003 No. 2720)
- The A47 Trunk Road (Thorney Bypass) Order 2003 (S.I. 2003 No. 2721)
- The A47 Trunk Road (Thorney Bypass) (Detrunking) Order 2003 (S.I. 2003 No. 2722)
- The A14 Trunk Road (Rookery Crossroads Grade Separated Junction) (Prohibition of Use of Gaps in Central Reservation) Order 2003 (S.I. 2003 No. 2723)
- The Lancaster Port Commission Harbour Revision (Constitution) Order 2003 (S.I. 2003 No. 2724)
- The School Staffing (England) (Amendment) Regulations 2003 (S.I. 2003 No. 2725)
- The Pig Industry Restructuring Grant (Wales) (Variation) Scheme 2003 (S.I. 2003 No. 2726 (W.261))
- Cynllun Grantiau Ailstrwythuro'r Diwydiant Moch (Cymru) (Amrywio) 2003 (S.I. 2003 Rhif 2726 (Cy.261))
- The Smoke Control Areas (Exempted Fireplaces) (Wales) Order 2003 (S.I. 2003 No. 2727 (W.262))
- Gorchymyn Ardaloedd Rheoli Mwg (Lleoedd Tân Esempt) (Cymru) 2003 (S.I. 2003 Rhif 2727 (Cy.262))
- The Burma (Sale, Supply and Export of Goods) (Penalties) (Amendment) Regulations 2003 (S.I. 2003 No. 2742)
- The Offshore Installations (Safety Zones) (No. 3) Order 2003 (S.I. 2003 No. 2743)
- The Individual Savings Account (Amendment) Regulations 2003 (S.I. 2003 No. 2747)
- The Personal Equity Plan (Amendment) Regulations 2003 (S.I. 2003 No. 2748)
- The Designation of Schools having a Religious Character (England) (No.3) Order 2003 (S.I. 2003 No. 2749)
- The Advanced Television Services (Amendment) Regulations 2003 (S.I. 2003 No. 2750)
- The Education (Co-ordination of Admission Arrangements) (Primary Schools) (England) (Amendment) Regulations 2003 (S.I. 2003 No. 2751)
- The Northern Ireland Assembly (Elections and Periods of Suspension) Act 2003 (Consequential Modifications No. 2) Order 2003 (S.I. 2003 No. 2752)
- The Lincolnshire (Coroners' Districts) Order 2003 (S.I. 2003 No. 2753)
- The Animal By-Products (Identification) (Amendment) (Wales) (No. 2) Regulations 2003 (S.I. 2003 No. 2754 (W.265))
- Rheoliadau Sgil-gynhyrchion Anifeiliaid (Adnabod) (Diwygio) (Cymru) (Rhif 2) 2003 (S.I. 2003 Rhif 2754 (Cy.265))
- The Kava-kava in Food (Wales) (Revocation) Regulations 2003 (S.I. 2003 No. 2755 (W.266))
- Rheoliadau Cafa-cafa mewn Bwyd (Cymru) (Dirymu) 2003 (S.I. 2003 Rhif 2755 (Cy.266))
- The Animal By-Products (Wales) Regulations 2003 (S.I. 2003 No. 2756 (W.267))
- Rheoliadau Sgil-gynhyrchion Anifeiliaid (Cymru) 2003 (S.I. 2003 Rhif 2756 (Cy.267))
- The Value Added Tax Tribunals (Amendment) Rules 2003 (S.I. 2003 No. 2757)
- The Channel Tunnel (Alcoholic Liquor and Tobacco Products) Order 2003 (S.I. 2003 No. 2758)
- The Export of Objects of Cultural Interest (Control) Order 2003 (S.I. 2003 No. 2759)
- The Stamp Duty and Stamp Duty Land Tax (Variation of the Finance Act 2003) Regulations 2003 (S.I. 2003 No. 2760)
- The Weighing Equipment (Automatic Catchweighing Instruments) Regulations 2003 (S.I. 2003 No. 2761)
- The Motor Vehicle Tyres (Safety) (Amendment) (No. 2) Regulations 2003 (S.I. 2003 No. 2762)
- The Pigs (Records, Identification and Movement) (Interim Measures) (Wales) (No.2) (Amendment) (No.2) Order 2003 (S.I. 2003 No. 2763 (W.268))
- Gorchymyn Moch (Cofnodion, Adnabod a Symud) (Mesurau Dros Dro) (Cymru) (Rhif 2) (Diwygio) (Rhif 2) 2003 (S.I. 2003 Rhif 2763 (Cy.268))
- Export of Goods, Transfer of Technology and Provision of Technical Assistance (Control) Order 2003 (S.I. 2003 No. 2764)
- The Trade in Goods (Control) Order 2003 (S.I. 2003 No. 2765)
- The Coventry Primary Care Trust (Change of Name) Amendment Order 2003 (S.I. 2003 No. 2766)
- The Borough of Dudley (Electoral Changes) Order 2003 (S.I. 2003 No. 2767)
- The City of Birmingham (Electoral Changes) Order 2003 (S.I. 2003 No. 2769)
- The Disability Discrimination Act 1995 (Pensions) Regulations 2003 (S.I. 2003 No. 2770)
- The National Lottery (Licence Fees) (Amendment) Order 2003 (S.I. 2003 No. 2771)
- The NHSU (Establishment and Constitution) Order 2003 (S.I. 2003 No. 2772)
- The NHSU Regulations 2003 (S.I. 2003 No. 2773)
- The A5 Trunk Road (Weeford-Fazeley Improvement) (De-trunking) Order 2003 (S.I. 2003 No. 2774)
- The Judicial Pensions and Retirement Act 1993 (Qualifying Judicial Offices) (Amendment) Order 2003 (S.I. 2003 No. 2775)
- The A5 Trunk Road (Weeford-Fazeley Improvement) Order 2003 (S.I. 2003 No. 2776)
- The A38 Trunk Road (Weeford) Order 2003 (S.I. 2003 No. 2777)
- The A63 Trunk Road (Melton Grade Separated Junction And Slip Roads) Order 2003 (S.I. 2003 No. 2778)
- The Child Support (Miscellaneous Amendments) (No. 2) Regulations 2003 (S.I. 2003 No. 2779)
- The Horse Passports (England) Regulations 2003 (S.I. 2003 No. 2780)
- Channel Tunnel (International Arrangements) (Amendment) Order 2003 (S.I. 2003 No. 2799)
- The Social Security (Electronic Communications) (Carer's Allowance) Order 2003 (S.I. 2003 No. 2800)

== 2801–2900 ==
- The A64 Trunk Road (Top Lane Link Road/A1036 Eastbound Exit Slip Road (Part) (Detrunking) Order 2003 (S.I. 2003 No. 2801)
- The Tax Credits (Miscellaneous Amendments No.2) Regulations 2003 (S.I. 2003 No. 2815)
- The Stamp Duty and Stamp Duty Land Tax (Variation of the Finance Act 2003) (No. 2) Regulations 2003 (S.I. 2003 No. 2816)
- The Financial Services and Markets Act 2000 (Disclosure of Confidential Information) (Amendment) (No. 3) Regulations 2003 (S.I. 2003 No. 2817)
- The Nationality, Immigration and Asylum Act 2002 (Juxtaposed Controls) Order 2003 (S.I. 2003 No. 2818)
- The Organic Products (Imports from Third Countries) Regulations 2003 (S.I. 2003 No. 2821)
- The Financial Services and Markets Act 2000 (Regulated Activities) (Amendment) (No. 3) Order 2003 (S.I. 2003 No. 2822)
- The National Police Records (Recordable Offences) (Amendment) Regulations 2003 (S.I. 2003 No. 2823)
- The National Health Service (Improved Access, Quality Information Preparation and Violent Patients Schemes) (England) Regulations 2003 (S.I. 2003 No. 2824)
- The A45 Trunk Road (A45/A445 Ryton-on-Dunsmore Junction Improvement) Order 2003 (S.I. 2003 No. 2825)
- The Employment Equality (Sexual Orientation) (Amendment) Regulations 2003 (S.I. 2003 No. 2827)
- The Employment Equality (Religion or Belief) (Amendment) Regulations 2003 (S.I. 2003 No. 2828)
- The Lynn Offshore Wind Farm Order 2003 (S.I. 2003 No. 2829)
- The Norfolk Offshore Wind Farm Order 2003 (S.I. 2003 No. 2830)
- The Inner Dowsing Offshore Wind Farm Order 2003 (S.I. 2003 No. 2831)
- The Channel Tunnel Rail Link (Nomination) (Amendment) (No. 2) Order 2003 (S.I. 2003 No. 2834)
- The Stamp Duty Land Tax (Administration) Regulations 2003 (S.I. 2003 No. 2837)
- The Community Legal Service (Financial) (Amendment No. 2) Regulations 2003 (S.I. 2003 No. 2838)
- The Family Proceedings (Amendment No. 2) Rules 2003 (S.I. 2003 No. 2839 (L. 35)])
- Family Proceedings Courts (Children Act 1989) (Amendment) Rules 2003 (S.I. 2003 No. 2840 (L. 36)])
- The Merchant Shipping (Merchant Navy Reserve) (Revocation) Regulations 2003 (S.I. 2003 No. 2861)
- The General Insurance Reserves (Tax) (Amendment) Regulations 2003 (S.I. 2003 No. 2862)
- The National Health Service (General Medical Services etc.) (Patients' Forums) Amendment Regulations 2003 (S.I. 2003 No. 2863)
- The Code of Practice on Equal Pay Order 2003 (S.I. 2003 No. 2865)
- The Stamp Duty Land Tax (Consequential Amendment of Enactments) Regulations 2003 (S.I. 2003 No. 2867)
- The Stamp Duty and Stamp Duty Land Tax (Consequential Amendment of Enactments) Regulations 2003 (S.I. 2003 No. 2868)
- The New Opportunities Fund (Increase in Membership) Order 2003 (S.I. 2003 No. 2869)
- National Savings Bank (Amendment) Regulations 2003 (S.I. 2003 No. 2895)
- The Thurrock Development Corporation (Area and Constitution) Order 2003 (S.I. 2003 No. 2896)
- The Stamp Duty Land Tax (Appointment of the Implementation Date) Order 2003 (S.I. 2003 No. 2899 (C. 106)])
- The Immigration and Asylum Act 1999 (Guernsey)Order 2003 (S.I. 2003 No. 2900)

== 2901–3000 ==
- The European Communities (Designation) (No. 4)Order 2003 (S.I. 2003 No. 2901)
- The Employment (Northern Ireland) Order 2003 (S.I. 2003 No. 2902 (N.I. 15)])
- The Road Traffic (Driving Disqualifications) (Northern Ireland) Order 2003 (S.I. 2003 No. 2903 (N.I. 16)])
- The Partnerships etc. (Removal of Twenty Member Limit) (Northern Ireland) Order 2003 (S.I. 2003 No. 2904 (N.I. 17)])
- The Air Navigation (Amendment) (No. 2) Order 2003 (S.I. 2003 No. 2905)
- The Greater Manchester (Light Rapid Transit System) (Didsbury) Order 2003 (S.I. 2003 No. 2907)
- The Postal Services Act 2000 (Consequential Modifications) Order 2003 (S.I. 2003 No. 2908)
- The Schools Forums (Wales) Regulations 2003 (S.I. 2003 No. 2909 (W.275))
- Rheoliadau Fforymau Ysgolion (Cymru) 2003 (S.I. 2003 Rhif 2909 (Cy.275))
- The Food (Peanuts from Egypt) (Emergency Control) (Wales) Regulations 2003 (S.I. 2003 No. 2910 (W.276))
- Rheoliadau Bwyd (Pysgnau o'r Aifft) (Rheolaeth Frys) (Cymru) 2003 (S.I. 2003 Rhif 2910 (Cy.276))
- The Feeding Stuffs, the Feeding Stuffs (Sampling and Analysis) and the Feeding Stuffs (Enforcement) (Amendment) (England) (No. 2) Regulations 2003 (S.I. 2003 No.2912)
- The African Swine Fever (England) Order 2003 (S.I. 2003 No. 2913)
- The Stamp Duty Land Tax (Amendment of Schedule 5 to the Finance Act 2003) Regulations 2003 (S.I. 2003 No. 2914)
- The Prescription Only Medicines (Human Use) Amendment (No. 2) Order 2003 (S.I. 2003 No. 2915)
- The Judicial Pensions (Election against Benefits) Regulations 2003 (S.I. 2003 No. 2916)
- The Leeds City Council (Skelton Footbridge) Scheme 2003 Confirmation Instrument 2003 (S.I. 2003 No. 2917)
- The Reading College and School of Arts and Design (Dissolution) Order 2003 (S.I. 2003 No. 2918)
- Veterinary Surgeons' Qualifications (European Recognition) Order 2003 (S.I. 2003 No. 2919)
- The Consular Fees (Amendment) Order 2003 (S.I. 2003 No. 2920)
- The Parliamentary Commissioner Order 2003 (S.I. 2003 No. 2921)
- The Transfer of Functions (European Parliamentary Pay and Pensions) Order 2003 (S.I. 2003 No. 2922)
- The Local Government Act 2003 (Commencement No. 1 and Transitional Provisions and Savings) Order 2003 (S.I. 2003 No. 2938 (C. 107)])
- The Education (Nursery Education and Early Years Development) (England) (Amendment) Regulations 2003 (S.I. 2003 No.2939)
- The Plymouth Primary Care Trust (Change of Name) Amendment Order 2003 (S.I. 2003 No. 2944)
- The Lands Tribunal (Amendment) Rules 2003 (S.I. 2003 No. 2945)
- Education (Amendment of the Curriculum Requirements for Fourth Key Stage) (England) Order 2003 (S.I. 2003 No. 2946)
- The Town and Country Planning (Costs of Inquiries etc.) (Examination in Public) (England) (No. 2) Regulations 2003 (S.I. 2003 No. 2948)
- The Pig Carcase (Grading) (Amendment) (England) Regulations 2003 (S.I. 2003 No. 2949)
- The Merchant Shipping (Fire Protection) Regulations 2003 (S.I. 2003 No. 2950)
- The Merchant Shipping (Fire Protection) Regulations (Amendment) Regulations 2003 (S.I. 2003 No. 2951)
- The Medicines (Products for Animal Use—Fees) (Amendment) Regulations 2003 (S.I. 2003 No. 2957)
- The Social Security (Contributions) (Amendment No. 7) Regulations 2003 (S.I. 2003 No. 2958)
- The Education Act 2002 (Transitional Provisions and Consequential Amendments) (No.2) (Wales) Regulations 2003 (S.I. 2003 No. 2959 (W.277))
- Rheoliadau Deddf Addysg 2002 (Darpariaethau Trosiannol a Diwygiadau Canlyniadol) (Rhif 2) (Cymru) 2003 (S.I. 2003 Rhif 2959 (Cy.277))
- The Family Proceedings Courts (Constitution) (Greater London) Rules 2003 (S.I. 2003 No. 2960 (L. 37)])
- The Education Act 2002 (Commencement No. 3) (Wales) Order 2003 (S.I. 2003 No. 2961 (W.278) (C.108))
- Gorchymyn Deddf Addysg 2002 (Cychwyn Rhif 3) (Cymru) 2003 (S.I. 2003 Rhif 2961 (Cy.278) (C.108))
- The Education (Admission Forums) (Wales) Regulations 2003 (S.I. 2003 No. 2962 (W.279))
- Rheoliadau Addysg (Fforymau Derbyn) (Cymru) 2003 (S.I. 2003 Rhif 2962 (Cy.279))
- The Local Authorities (Allowances for Members of County and County Borough Councils) (Pensions) (Wales) Regulations 2003 (S.I. 2003 No. 2963 (W.280))
- Rheoliadau Awdurdodau Lleol (Lwfansau i Aelodau Cynghorau Sir a Chynghorau Bwrdeistref Sirol) (Pensiynau) (Cymru) 2003 (S.I. 2003 Rhif 2963 (Cy.280))
- The Road Vehicles (Registration and Licensing) (Amendment) (No. 3) Regulations 2003 (S.I. 2003 No. 2981)
- The Companies (Forms) (Amendment) Regulations 2003 (S.I. 2003 No. 2982)
- The Wireless Telegraphy (Licence Charges) (Amendment) Regulations 2003 (S.I. 2003 No. 2983)
- The Wireless Telegraphy (Licence Charges) (Amendment) (Channel Islands and Isle of Man) Regulations 2003 (S.I. 2003 No. 2984)
- The Finance Act 2003, Part 3, (Appointed Day) Order 2003 (S.I. 2003 No. 2985 (C.109)])
- The Sustainable Energy Act 2003 (Commencement No. 1) Order 2003 (S.I. 2003 No. 2986 (C. 110)])
- The Sustainable Energy (CHP Provisions) Order 2003 (S.I. 2003 No. 2987)
- The Food (Brazil Nuts) (Emergency Control) (England) (Amendment) Regulations 2003 (S.I. 2003 No.2988)
- The Northern Ireland Assembly (Elections) (Amendment) Order 2003 (S.I. 2003 No. 2989)
- The A41 London to Birkenhead Trunk Road (Buckinghamshire) (Detrunking) Order 2003 (S.I. 2003 No. 2990)
- The A41 London to Birkenhead Trunk Road (Hertfordshire) (Detrunking) Order 2003 (S.I. 2003 No. 2991)
- The Education Act 2002 (Commencement No. 2 and Savings and Transitional Provisions) (Amendment No. 2) Order 2003 (S.I. 2003 No. 2992 (C.111)])
- The Nationality, Immigration and Asylum Act 2002 (Commencement No. 4) (Amendment) (No. 3) Order 2003 (S.I. 2003 No. 2993 (C. 112)])
- The Department for Transport (Driver Licensing and Vehicle Registration Fees) Order 2003 (S.I. 2003 No. 2994)
- The A41 London to Birkenhead Trunk Road (Oxfordshire) (Detrunking) Order 2003 (S.I. 2003 No. 2995)

== 3001–3100 ==
- The Occupational Pensions (Revaluation) Order 2003 (S.I. 2003 No. 3002)
- The Collagen and Gelatine (Intra-Community Trade) (England) (No. 2) Regulations 2003 (S.I. 2003 No. 3003)
- The Local Government Pension Scheme (Amendment) (No. 2) Regulations 2003 (S.I. 2003 No. 3004)
- The Secure Training Centre (Amendment) Rules 2003 (S.I. 2003 No. 3005)
- The Race Relations Act 1976 (Statutory Duties) Order 2003 (S.I. 2003 No. 3006)
- The Race Relations Act 1976 (General Statutory Duty) Order 2003 (S.I. 2003 No. 3007)
- The Council Tax (Prescribed Classes of Dwellings) (England) Regulations 2003 (S.I. 2003 No. 3011)
- The Local Authorities (Calculation of Council Tax Base) (Amendment) (England) Regulations 2003 (S.I. 2003 No. 3012)
- The Social Fund Cold Weather Payments (General) Amendment (No.2) Regulations 2003 (S.I. 2003 No. 3023)
- The Motor Cars (Driving Instruction) (Amendment) Regulations 2003 (S.I. 2003 No. 3027)
- The Private Hire Vehicles (London) (Transitional and Saving Provisions) (Amendment) Regulations 2003 (S.I. 2003 No. 3028)
- The New Northern Ireland Assembly Elections (Returning Officer's Charges) (Amendment) Order 2003 (S.I. 2003 No. 3029)
- The Building (Repeal of Provisions of Local Acts) Regulations 2003 (S.I. 2003 No. 3030)
- The Companies (Acquisition of Own Shares) (Treasury Shares) No. 2 Regulations 2003 (S.I. 2003 No. 3031)
- The Millennium Commission (Reduction in Membership) Order 2003 (S.I. 2003 No. 3033)
- The Local Government Act 2003 (Commencement) (Wales) Order 2003 (S.I. 2003 No. 3034 (W.282) (C.113))
- Gorchymyn Deddf Llywodraeth Leol 2003 (Cychwyn) (Cymru) 2003 (S.I. 2003 Rhif 3034 (Cy.282) (C.113))
- The Shrimp Fishing Nets (Wales) Order 2003 (S.I. 2003 No. 3035 (W.283))
- Gorchymyn Rhwydi Pysgota Perdys (Cymru) 2003 (S.I. 2003 Rhif 3035 (Cy.283))
- The South Wales Sea Fisheries District (Variation) Order 2003 (S.I. 2003 No. 3036 (W.284))
- Gorchymyn Ardal Pysgodfeydd Môr De Cymru (Amrywio) 2003 (S.I. 2003 Rhif 3036 (Cy.284))
- The Cocoa and Chocolate Products (Wales) Regulations 2003 (S.I. 2003 No. 3037 (W.285))
- Rheoliadau Cynhyrchion Coco a Siocled (Cymru) 2003 (S.I. 2003 Rhif 3037 (Cy.285))
- Employment Rights (Increase of Limits) Order 2003 (S.I. 2003 No. 3038)
- The Northern Ireland Act 1998 (Modification) Order 2003 (S.I. 2003 No. 3039)
- The Fruit Juices and Fruit Nectars (Wales) Regulations 2003 (S.I. 2003 No. 3041 (W.286))
- Rheoliadau Suddoedd Ffrwythau a Neithdarau Ffrwythau (Cymru) 2003 (S.I. 2003 Rhif 3041 (Cy.286))
- The Natural Mineral Water, Spring Water and Bottled Drinking Water (Amendment) (Wales) Regulations 2003 (S.I. 2003 No. 3042 (W.287))
- Rheoliadau Dŵ r Mwynol Naturiol, Dŵ r Ffynnon a Dŵ r Yfed wedi'i Botelu (Diwygio) (Cymru) 2003 (S.I. 2003 Rhif 3042 (Cy.287))
- The Finance Act 2002, section 24, (Appointed Day) Order 2003 (S.I. 2003 No. 3043 (C. 114)])
- The Honey (Wales) Regulations 2003 (S.I. 2003 No. 3044 (W.288))
- Rheoliadau Mêl (Cymru) 2003 (S.I. 2003 Rhif 3044 (Cy.288))
- The Public Lending Right Scheme 1982 (Commencement of Variation) Order 2003 (S.I. 2003 No. 3045)
- The Council Tax (Valuation Bands) (Wales) Order 2003 (S.I. 2003 No. 3046 (W.289))
- Gorchymyn y Dreth Gyngor (Bandiau Prisio) (Cymru) 2003 (S.I. 2003 Rhif 3046 (Cy.289))
- The Specified Sugar Products (Wales) Regulations 2003 (S.I. 2003 No. 3047 (W.290))
- Rheoliadau Cynhyrchion Siwgr Penodedig (Cymru) 2003 (S.I. 2003 Rhif 3047 (Cy.290))
- The Registration of Births and Deaths (Amendment) Regulations 2003 (S.I. 2003 No. 3048)
- The Merchant Shipping (Working Time: Inland Waterways) Regulations 2003 (S.I. 2003 No. 3049)
- The Council Tax and Non-Domestic Rating (Electronic Communications) (England) (No. 2) Order 2003 (S.I. 2003 No. 3052)
- The Condensed Milk and Dried Milk (Wales) Regulations 2003 (S.I. 2003 No. 3053 (W.291))
- Rheoliadau Llaeth Cyddwys a Llaeth Sych (Cymru) 2003 (S.I. 2003 Rhif 3053 (Cy.291))
- The Nurses Agencies (Wales) (Amendment) Regulations 2003 (S.I. 2003 No. 3054 (W.292))
- Rheoliadau Asiantaethau Nyrsys (Cymru) (Diwygio) 2003 (S.I. 2003 Rhif 3054 (Cy.292))
- The City of Westminster (Paddington Station LTVA General Arrangement Bishops Bridge North Bridge) Scheme 2001 Confirmation Instrument 2003 (S.I. 2003 No. 3056)
- The NHS Professionals Special Health Authority (Establishment and Constitution) Order 2003 (S.I. 2003 No. 3059)
- The NHS Professionals Special Health Authority Regulations 2003 (S.I. 2003 No. 3060)
- The Health (Wales) Act 2003 (Commencement No. 2) Order 2003 (S.I. 2003 No. 3064 (W.293)(C.115))
- Gorchymyn Deddf Iechyd (Cymru) 2003 (Cychwyn Rhif 2) 2003 (S.I. 2003 Rhif 3064 (Cy.293)(C.115))
- The South Wales Sea Fisheries Committee (Levies) Regulations 2003 (S.I. 2003 No. 3072 (W.294))
- Rheoliadau Pwyllgor Pysgodfeydd Môr De Cymru (Ardollau) 2003 (S.I. 2003 Rhif 3072 (Cy.294))
- The Road Vehicles (Registration and Licensing) (Amendment) (No. 4) Regulations 2003 (S.I. 2003 No. 3073)
- The Proceeds of Crime Act 2002 (Business in the Regulated Sector and Supervisory Authorities) Order 2003 (S.I. 2003 No. 3074)
- The Money Laundering Regulations 2003 (S.I. 2003 No. 3075)
- The Terrorism Act 2000 (Business in the Regulated Sector and Supervisory Authorities) Order 2003 (S.I. 2003 No. 3076)
- The Finance Act 2003, Section 195 and Schedule 40 (Appointed Day) Order 2003 (S.I. 2003 No.3077 (C.116)])
- The Motor Fuel (Composition and Content) (Amendment) Regulations 2003 (S.I. 2003 No. 3078)
- The Adoption and Children Act 2002 (Commencement No. 4) Order 2003 (S.I. 2003 No. 3079 (C.117)])
- The Council Tax and Non-Domestic Rating (Demand Notices) (England) (Amendment) Regulations 2003 (S.I. 2003 No. 3081)
- Local Education Authority (Behaviour Support Plans) (Exception) (England) Regulations 2003 (S.I. 2003 No. 3082)
- The National Health Service Reform and Health Care Professions Act 2002 (Commencement No. 7) Order 2003 (S.I. 2003 No. 3083 (C. 118)])
- The Fireworks Act 2003 (Commencement No. 1) Order 2003 (S.I. 2003 No. 3084 (C. 119)])
- The Fireworks Regulations 2003 (S.I. 2003 No. 3085)
- The Finance Act 2002, Section 19 (Appointed Days etc.) Order 2003 (S.I. 2003 No.3086 (C.120)])
- The City of Wakefield (Electoral Changes) Order 2003 (S.I. 2003 No. 3087)
- The Borough of Calderdale (Electoral Changes) Order 2003 (S.I. 2003 No. 3088)
- The City of Leeds (Electoral Changes) Order 2003 (S.I. 2003 No. 3089)
- The Borough of Barnsley (Electoral Changes) Order 2003 (S.I. 2003 No. 3090)
- The Borough of Kirklees (Electoral Changes) Order 2003 (S.I. 2003 No. 3091)
- The Mutual Assistance Provisions Order 2003 (S.I. 2003 No. 3092)
- Communications Act 2003 (Amendment of the Medicines (Monitoring of Advertising) Regulations 1994) Order 2003 (S.I. 2003 No. 3093)
- The Education (Teacher Training Bursaries) (England) (Amendment) Regulations 2003 (S.I. 2003 No. 3094)
- Human Fertilisation and Embryology (Deceased Fathers) Act 2003 (Commencement) Order 2003 (S.I. 2003 No. 3095 (C. 121)])
- The Regulatory Reform (Business Tenancies) (England and Wales) Order 2003 (S.I. 2003 No. 3096)
- The Sefton (Parishes) Order 2003 (S.I. 2003 No. 3098)
- The Registration of Establishments (Laying Hens) (England) Regulations 2003 (S.I. 2003 No. 3100)

== 3101–3200 ==
- The Oil and Fibre Plant Seed (England) (Amendment) Regulations 2003 (S.I. 2003 No. 3101)
- The Export (Penalty) Regulations 2003 (S.I. 2003 No. 3102)
- The Extradition Act 2003 (Commencement and Savings) Order 2003 (S.I. 2003 No. 3103 (C. 122)])
- The Wireless Telegraphy (Interception and Disclosure of Messages) (Designation) Regulations 2003 (S.I. 2003 No. 3104)
- The Dental Auxiliaries (Amendment) Regulations 2003 (S.I. 2003 No. 3105)
- The Extradition Act 2003 (Police Powers) Order 2003 (S.I. 2003 No. 3106)
- The Extradition Act 2003 (Police Powers) (Northern Ireland) Order 2003 (S.I. 2003 No. 3107)
- Designation of Schools Having a Religious Character (Independent Schools) (England) Order 2003 (S.I. 2003 No. 3108)
- The Extradition Act 2003 (Part 1 Designated Authorities) Order 2003 (S.I. 2003 No. 3109)
- The Road Vehicles (Registration and Licensing) (Amendment) (No. 5) Regulations 2003 (S.I. 2003 No. 3110)
- Education (Head Teachers' Qualifications) (England) Regulations 2003 (S.I. 2003 No. 3111)
- The Customs (Contravention of a Relevant Rule) Regulations 2003 (S.I. 2003 No. 3113)
- The National Assembly for Wales (Returning Officers' Charges) (Amendment) Order 2003 (S.I. 2003 No. 3117 (W.295))
- Gorchymyn Cynulliad Cenedlaethol Cymru (Taliadau Swyddogion Canlyniadau) (Diwygio) 2003 (S.I. 2003 Rhif 3117 (Cy.295))
- The LEA Budget, Schools Budget and Individual Schools Budget (Wales) Regulations 2003 (S.I. 2003 No. 3118 (W.296))
- Rheoliadau Cyllidebau AALl, Cyllidebau Ysgolion a Chyllidebau Ysgolion Unigol (Cymru) 2003 (S.I. 2003 Rhif 3118 (Cy.296))
- The Feeding Stuffs, the Feeding Stuffs (Sampling and Analysis) and the Feeding Stuffs (Enforcement) (Amendment) (Wales) (No.2) Regulations 2003 (S.I. 2003 No. 3119 (W.297))
- Rheoliadau Porthiant, Porthiant (Samplu a Dadansoddi) a Phorthiant (Gorfodi) (Diwygio) (Cymru) (Rhif 2) 2003 (S.I. 2003 Rhif 3119 (Cy.297))
- The Jam and Similar Products (England) Regulations 2003 (S.I. 2003 No. 3120)
- The Council Tax (Chargeable Dwellings, Exempt Dwellings and Discount Disregards) (Amendment) (England) Order 2003 (S.I. 2003 No. 3121)
- The Disability Discrimination Act 1995 (Private Hire Vehicles) (Carriage of Guide Dogs etc.) (England and Wales) Regulations 2003 (S.I. 2003 No. 3122)
- The Private Hire Vehicles (Carriage of Guide Dogs etc.) Act 2002 (Commencement No. 1) Order 2003 (S.I. 2003 No. 3123 (C. 123)])
- The Education (Recognised Bodies) (Wales) Order 2003 (S.I. 2003 No. 3124 (W.298))
- Gorchymyn Addysg (Cyrff sy'n Cael eu Cydnabod) (Cymru) 2003 (S.I. 2003 Rhif 3124 (Cy.298))
- The Council Tax (Liability for Owners) (Amendment) (England) Regulations 2003 (S.I. 2003 No. 3125)
- The Northern Ireland (Monitoring Commission etc.) Act 2003 (Immunities and Privileges) Order 2003 (S.I. 2003 No. 3126)
- The Non-Domestic Rating Contributions (England) (Amendment) Regulations 2003 (S.I. 2003 No. 3130)
- THE STATISTICS OF TRADE (CUSTOMS AND EXCISE) (AMENDMENT) REGULATIONS 2003 (S.I. 2003 No. 3131)
- The Powys (Llanbadarn Fynydd, Llanbister and Abbey Cwmhir) Order 2003 (S.I. 2003 No. 3132 (W.299))
- Gorchymyn Powys (Llanbadarn Fynydd, Llanbister ac Abaty Cwm-hir) 2003 (S.I. 2003 Rhif 3132 (Cy.299))
- The Building and Building (Approved Inspectors etc.) (Amendment) Regulations 2003 (S.I. 2003 No.3133)
- The Denbighshire (Rhuddlan, Rhyl, Dyserth and Prestatyn) Order 2003 (S.I. 2003 No. 3134 (W.300))
- Gorchymyn Sir Ddinbych (Rhuddlan, y Rhyl, Dyserth a Phrestatyn) 2003 (S.I. 2003 Rhif 3134 (Cy.300))
- The Merchant Shipping (Liability of Shipowners and Others) (New Rate of Interest) Order 2003 (S.I. 2003 No. 3135)
- The Merchant Shipping (Liability of Shipowners and Others) (Rate of Interest) (Amendment) Order 2003 (S.I. 2003 No. 3136)
- The Cardiff (Llandaff North, Whitchurch, Llanishen, Lisvane, Ely and St. Fagans Communities) Order 2003 (S.I. 2003 No. 3137 (W.301))
- Gorchymyn Caerdydd (Cymunedau Ystum Taf, yr Eglwys Newydd, Llanisien, Llys-Faen, Trelái a Sain Ffagan) 2003 (S.I. 2003 Rhif 3137 (Cy.301))
- The Education (Health Standards) (England) Regulations 2003 (S.I. 2003 No. 3139)
- The Regulation of Investigatory Powers Act 2000 (Commencement No. 3) Order 2003 (S.I. 2003 No. 3140 (C. 124)])
- The Medicines (Pharmacies) (Applications for Registration and Fees) Amendment Regulations 2003 (S.I. 2003 No. 3141)
- The Office of Communications Act 2002 (Commencement No. 3) and Communications Act 2003 (Commencement No. 2) Order 2003 (S.I. 2003 No. 3142 (C. 125)])
- The Income and Corporation Taxes (Electronic Certificates of Deduction of Tax and Tax Credit) Regulations 2003 (S.I. 2003 No. 3143)
- The Radio Equipment and Telecommunications Terminal Equipment (Amendment No. 2) Regulations 2003 (S.I. 2003 No. 3144)
- The Road Vehicles (Construction and Use) (Amendment) (No. 5) Regulations 2003 (S.I. 2003 No. 3145)
- The Local Authorities (Capital Finance and Accounting) (England) Regulations 2003 (S.I. 2003 No. 3146)
- The A59 Trunk Road (Preston-Skipton) (Detrunking) Order 2003 (S.I. 2003 No. 3147)
- The European Qualifications (Health Care Professions) Regulations 2003 (S.I. 2003 No. 3148)
- The A565 Trunk Road (Bootle-Southport) (Detrunking) Order 2003 (S.I. 2003 No. 3149)
- The Extradition Act 2003 (Multiple Offences) Order 2003 (S.I. 2003 No. 3150)
- The A646 Trunk Road (Halifax-M65) (Detrunking) Order 2003 (S.I. 2003 No. 3151)
- The A565 Trunk Road (Southport-South of Preston) (Detrunking) Order 2003 (S.I. 2003 No. 3152)
- The A570 Trunk Road (North of St. Helens-M58) (Detrunking) Order 2003 (S.I. 2003 No. 3153)
- The A679 Trunk Road (Halifax-Burnley) (Detrunking) Order 2003 (S.I. 2003 No. 3154)
- The A580 Trunk Road (Liverpool-Salford) (Detrunking) Order 2003 (S.I. 2003 No. 3155)
- The Nationality, Immigration and Asylum Act 2002 (Commencement No. 6) Order 2003 (S.I. 2003 No. 3156 (C. 126)])
- The British Nationality (Fees) Regulations 2003 (S.I. 2003 No. 3157)
- The British Nationality (General) (Amendment) Regulations 2003 (S.I. 2003 No. 3158)
- The British Nationality (British Overseas Territories) (Amendment) (No. 2) Regulations 2003 (S.I. 2003 No. 3159)
- The A421 Trunk Road (Great Barford Bypass) Detrunking Order 2003 (S.I. 2003 No. 3162)
- The A421 Trunk Road (Great Barford Bypass and Slip Roads) Order 2003 (S.I. 2003 No. 3163)
- The LEA Budget, Schools Budget and Individual Schools Budget (England) Regulations 2003 (S.I. 2003 No. 3170)
- The Regulation of Investigatory Powers (Directed Surveillance and Covert Human Intelligence Sources) Order 2003 (S.I. 2003 No. 3171)
- The Regulation of Investigatory Powers (Communications Data) Order 2003 (S.I. 2003 No. 3172)
- The Retention of Communications Data (Extension of Initial Period) Order 2003 (S.I. 2003 No. 3173)
- The Regulation of Investigatory Powers (Intrusive Surveillance) Order 2003 (S.I. 2003 No. 3174)
- The Retention of Communications Data (Code of Practice) Order 2003 (S.I. 2003 No. 3175)
- The Channel Four Television Corporation (Borrowing Limit) Order 2003 (S.I. 2003 No. 3176)
- The Products of Animal Origin (Third Country Imports) (England) Regulations 2003 (S.I. 2003 No. 3177)
- The Income-related Benefits (Subsidy to Authorities) Amendment Order 2003 (S.I. 2003 No. 3179)
- The Enterprise Act 2002 and Media Mergers (Consequential Amendments) Order 2003 (S.I. 2003 No. 3180)
- The Local Authorities (Calculation of Council Tax Base) (Amendment) (England) (No.2) Regulations 2003 (S.I. 2003 No. 3181)
- The Communications Act 2003 (Consequential Amendments No. 2) Order 2003 (S.I. 2003 No. 3182)
- The Control of Misleading Advertisements (Amendment) Regulations 2003 (S.I. 2003 No. 3183)
- The Register of Fines Regulations 2003 (S.I. 2003 No. 3184)
- The Immigration (European Economic Area) (Amendment No. 2) Regulations 2003 (S.I. 2003 No. 3188)
- The North East London Strategic Health Authority (Transfer of Trust Property) Order 2003 (S.I. 2003 No. 3189)
- The Commission for Social Care Inspection (Membership) Regulations 2003 (S.I. 2003 No. 3190)
- The Transfer of Functions (Children, Young People and Families) Order 2003 (S.I. 2003 No. 3191)
- The Broadcasting (Guernsey) Order 2003 (S.I. 2003 No. 3192)
- The Broadcasting (Isle of Man) Order 2003 (S.I. 2003 No. 3193)
- The Criminal Justice (No. 2) (Northern Ireland) Order 2003 (S.I. 2003 No. 3194 (N.I. 18)])
- The Communications (Bailiwick of Guernsey) Order 2003 (S.I. 2003 No. 3195)
- The Wireless Telegraphy (Jersey) Order 2003 (S.I. 2003 No. 3196)
- The Communications (Jersey) Order 2003 (S.I. 2003 No. 3197)
- The Communications (Isle of Man) Order 2003 (S.I. 2003 No. 3198)
- The Double Taxation Relief (Taxes on Income) (Australia) Order 2003 (S.I. 2003 No. 3199)
- The Double Taxation Relief (Taxes on Income)(Chile) Order 2003 (S.I. 2003 No. 3200)

== 3201–3300 ==
- The Misuse of Drugs Act 1971 (Modification) (No. 2) Order 2003 (S.I. 2003 No. 3201)
- The Food Benefit Schemes (Northern Ireland) Order 2003 (S.I. 2003 No. 3202 (N.I. 19)])
- The Broadcasting (Jersey) Order 2003 (S.I. 2003 No. 3203)
- The European Communities (Enforcement of Community Judgments) (Amendment) Order 2003 (S.I. 2003 No. 3204)
- The Education (Inspectors of Education and Training in Wales) Order 2003 (S.I. 2003 No. 3205)
- The Child Support (Information, Evidence and Disclosure) Amendment Regulations 2003 (S.I. 2003 No. 3206)
- The Processed Cereal-based Foods and Baby Foods for Infants and Young Children (England) Regulations 2003 (S.I. 2003 No. 3207)
- The Infant Formula and Follow-on Formula (Amendment) (England) Regulations 2003 (S.I. 2003 No. 3208)
- The Social Security (Notification of Change of Circumstances) Regulations 2003 (S.I. 2003 No. 3209)
- The Non-Domestic Rating Contributions (Wales) (Amendment) Regulations 2003 (S.I. 2003 No. 3211 (W.304))
- Rheoliadau Cyfraniadau Ardrethu Annomestig (Cymru) (Diwygio) 2003 (S.I. 2003 Rhif 3211 (Cy.304))
- The Immigration and Asylum Act 1999 (Part V Exemption: Relevant Employers) Order 2003 (S.I. 2003 No. 3214)
- The Income Tax (Indexation) (No.2) Order 2003 (S.I. 2003 No. 3215)
- The Value Added Tax (Amendment) (No. 6) Regulations 2003 (S.I. 2003 No. 3220)
- Licensing Act 2003 (Commencement No. 3) Order 2003 (S.I. 2003 No. 3222 (C. 127)])
- The Adoption Agencies (Amendment) (Wales) Regulations 2003 (S.I. 2003 No. 3223 (W.306))
- Rheoliadau Asiantaethau Mabwysiadu (Diwygio) (Cymru) 2003 (S.I. 2003 Rhif 3223 (Cy.306))
- The Cornwall (Coroners' Districts) Order 2003 (S.I. 2003 No. 3224)
- The Central Rating List (Wales) (Amendment) Regulations 2003 (S.I. 2003 No. 3225 (W.307))
- Rheoliadau Rhestr Ardrethu Canolog (Cymru) (Diwygio) 2003 (S.I. 2003 Rhif 3225 (Cy.307))
- The Financial Collateral Arrangements (No.2) Regulations 2003 (S.I. 2003 No. 3226)
- The Education (Pupil Exclusions and Appeals) (Maintained Schools) (Wales) Regulations 2003 (S.I. 2003 No. 3227 (W.308))
- Rheoliadau Addysg (Gwahardd Disgyblion ac Apelau) (Ysgolion a Gynhelir) (Cymru) 2003 (S.I. 2003 Rhif 3227 (Cy.308))
- The Firearms (Removal to Northern Ireland) (Revocation) Order 2003 (S.I. 2003 No. 3228)
- The Collagen and Gelatine (Intra-Community Trade) (Wales) Regulations 2003 (S.I. 2003 No. 3229 (W.309))
- Rheoliadau Colagen a Gelatin (Masnach o fewn y Gymuned) (Cymru) 2003 (S.I. 2003 Rhif 3229 (Cy.309))
- The Independent Schools (Provision of Information) (Wales) Regulations 2003 (S.I. 2003 No. 3230 (W.310))
- Rheoliadau Ysgolion Annibynnol (Darparu Gwybodaeth) (Cymru) 2003 (S.I. 2003 Rhif 3230 (Cy.310))
- The Education (School Day and School Year) (Wales) Regulations 2003 (S.I. 2003 No. 3231 (W.311))
- Rheoliadau Addysg (Y Diwrnod Ysgol a'r Flwyddyn Ysgol) (Cymru) 2003 (S.I. 2003 Rhif 3231 (Cy.311))
- The Independent Schools (Publication of Inspection Reports) (Wales) Regulations 2003 (S.I. 2003 No. 3232 (W.312))
- Rheoliadau Ysgolion Annibynnol (Cyhoeddi Adroddiadau Arolygu) (Cymru) 2003 (S.I. 2003 Rhif 3232 (Cy.312))
- The Independent Schools (Religious Character of Schools) (Designation Procedure) (Wales) Regulations 2003 (S.I. 2003 No. 3233 (W.313))
- Rheoliadau Ysgolion Annibynnol (Cymeriad Crefyddol Ysgolion) (Gweithdrefn Ddynodi) (Cymru) 2003 (S.I. 2003 Rhif 3233 (Cy.313))
- The Independent School Standards (Wales) Regulations 2003 (S.I. 2003 No. 3234 (W.314))
- Rheoliadau Safonau Ysgol Annibynnol (Cymru) 2003 (S.I. 2003 Rhif 3234 (Cy.314))
- The Wildlife and Countryside (Registration, Ringing and Marking of Certain Captive Birds) (Wales) Regulations 2003 (S.I. 2003 No. 3235 (W.315))
- Rheoliadau Bywyd Gwyllt a Chefn Gwlad (Cofrestru, Modrwyo a Marcio Adar Caeth Penodol) (Cymru) 2003 (S.I. 2003 Rhif 3235 (Cy.315))
- The National Health Service (Pharmaceutical Services) (Amendment) (No.2) (Wales) Regulations 2003 (S.I. 2003 No. 3236 (W.316))
- Rheoliadau'r Gwasanaeth Iechyd Gwladol (Gwasanaethau Fferyllol) (Diwygio) (Rhif 2) (Cymru) 2003 (S.I. 2003 Rhif 3236 (Cy.316))
- The Education (Information About Individual Pupils) (Wales) Regulations 2003 (S.I. 2003 No. 3237 (W.317))
- Rheoliadau Addysg (Gwybodaeth am Ddisgyblion Unigol) (Cymru) 2003 (S.I. 2003 Rhif 3237 (Cy.317))
- The Producer Responsibility Obligations (Packaging Waste) (Amendment) (Wales) Regulations 2003 (S.I. 2003 No. 3238 (W.318))
- Rheoliadau Rhwymedigaethau Cyfrifoldeb Cynhyrchwyr (Gwastraff Deunydd Pacio) (Diwygio) (Cymru) 2003 (S.I. 2003 Rhif 3238 (Cy.318))
- The Local Authorities (Capital Finance and Accounting) (Wales) Regulations 2003 (S.I. 2003 No. 3239 (W.319))
- The Tax Credits (Claims and Notifications) (Amendment) Regulations 2003 (S.I. 2003 No. 3240)
- The Plant Protection Products Regulations 2003 (S.I. 2003 No. 3241)
- The Water Environment (Water Framework Directive) (England and Wales) Regulations 2003 (S.I. 2003 No. 3242)
- The Water Environment (Water Framework Directive) (Northumbria River Basin District) Regulations 2003 (S.I. 2003 No. 3245)
- The Education (Pupil Exclusions and Appeals) (Pupil Referral Units) (Wales) Regulations 2003 (S.I. 2003 No. 3246 (W.321))
- Rheoliadau Addysg (Gwahardd Disgyblion ac Apelau) (Unedau Cyfeirio Disgyblion) (Cymru) 2003 (S.I. 2003 Rhif 3246 (Cy.321))
- The Financing of Maintained Schools (England) (No. 2) Regulations 2003 (S.I. 2003 No. 3247)
- The Extradition Act 2003 (Commencement and Savings) (Amendment) Order 2003 (S.I. 2003 No. 3258 (C. 128)])
- The St Aidan's CofE Primary School (Designation as having a Religious Character) Order 2003 (S.I. 2003 No. 3259)
- The A414 Trunk Road (Beechtrees to Buncefield Roundabout) Order 2004 (S.I. 2003 No. 3260)
- The M1 Motorway London to Yorkshire (Widening 6A to 10 Connecting Roads) Scheme 2004 (S.I. 2003 No. 3261)
- The Jarrow Cross CofE Primary School (Designation as having a Religious Character) Order 2003 (S.I. 2003 No. 3262)
- The Welfare of Animals (Slaughter or Killing) (Amendment) (England) Regulations 2003 (S.I. 2003 No. 3272)
- The African Swine Fever (Wales) Order 2003 (S.I. 2003 No. 3273 (W.323))
- Gorchymyn Clwy Affricanaidd y Moch (Cymru) 2003 (S.I. 2003 Rhif 3273 (Cy.323))
- The Environmental Protection (Controls on Dangerous Substances) Regulations 2003 (S.I. 2003 No. 3274)
- The Regulatory Reform (Gaming Machines) Order 2003 (S.I. 2003 No. 3275)
- The Severn Bridges Tolls Order 2003 (S.I. 2003 No. 3276)
- Education (Information About Individual Pupils) (England) (Amendment) Regulations 2003 (S.I. 2003 No. 3277)
- The Education (Funding for Teacher Training) Designation (No. 3) Order 2003 (S.I. 2003 No. 3278)
- The Commission for Healthcare Audit and Inspection (Membership) Regulations 2003 (S.I. 2003 No. 3279)
- The Education (Student Fees and Support) (Switzerland) Regulations 2003 (S.I. 2003 No. 3280)
- The Telephone Number Exclusion (Domain Names and Internet Addresses) Order 2003 (S.I. 2003 No. 3281)
- The Criminal Justice Act 2003 (Commencement No. 1) Order 2003 (S.I. 2003 No. 3282 (C.129)])
- The Intermittent Custody (Transitory Provisions) Order 2003 (S.I. 2003 No. 3283)
- Designation of Schools Having a Religious Character (Independent Schools) (England) (No.2) Order 2003 (S.I. 2003 No. 3284)
- The Immigration (Designation of Travel Bans) (Amendment No. 2) Order 2003 (S.I. 2003 No. 3285)
- The Air Navigation (General) (Amendment) (No. 2) Regulations 2003 (S.I. 2003 No.3286)
- The Stamp Duty Land Tax (Amendment of Schedule 4 to the Finance Act 2003) Regulations 2003 (S.I. 2003 No. 3293)
- The Producer Responsibility Obligations (Packaging Waste) (Amendment) (England) Regulations 2003 (S.I. 2003 No. 3294)
- The Miscellaneous Food Additives (Amendment) (England) (No. 2) Regulations 2003 (S.I. 2003 No. 3295)
- The Pollution Prevention and Control (England and Wales)(Amendment) (No. 2) Regulations 2003 (S.I. 2003 No. 3296)
- The Reporting of Savings Income Information Regulations 2003 (S.I. 2003 No.3297)
- The New Forest (Confirmation of the Byelaws of the Verderers of the New Forest) Order 2003 (S.I. 2003 No. 3298)
- The Media Ownership (Local Radio and Appointed News Provider) Order 2003 (S.I. 2003 No. 3299)
- The Anti-social Behaviour Act 2003 (Commencement No. 1 and Transitional Provisions) Order 2003 (S.I. 2003 No. 3300 (C. 130))

== 3301–3400 ==
- The Prison (Amendment) Rules 2003 (S.I. 2003 No. 3301)
- The Tax Credits (Provision of Information) (Evaluation and Statistical Studies) Regulations 2003 (S.I. 2003 No. 3308)
- The Animal Test Certificates (Revocation) Regulations 2003 (S.I. 2003 No. 3309)
- The Controls on Certain Azo Dyes and Blue Colourant Regulations 2003 (S.I. 2003 No. 3310)
- The Greenhouse Gas Emissions Trading Scheme Regulations 2003 (S.I. 2003 No. 3311)
- The Extradition Act 2003 (Commencement and Savings) (Amendment No. 2) Order 2003 (S.I. 2003 No. 3312 (C. 131)])
- The Motor Vehicles (Driving Licences) (Amendment) (No. 5) Regulations 2003 (S.I. 2003 No. 3313)
- The Road Vehicles (Brake Linings Safety) (Amendment) Regulations 2003 (S.I. 2003 No. 3314)
- The Electricity (Exemption from the Requirement for a Generation Licence) (No. 2) Order 2003 (S.I. 2003 No. 3318)
- The Conduct of Employment Agencies and Employment Businesses Regulations 2003 (S.I. 2003 No. 3319)
- The Homelessness (Suitability of Accommodation) (England) Order 2003 (S.I. 2003 No. 3326)
- Designation of Schools Having a Religious Character (Independent Schools) (England) (No.3) Order 2003 (S.I. 2003 No. 3328)
- The Extradition Act 2003 (Designation of Part 1 Territories) Order 2003 (S.I. 2003 No. 3333)
- The Extradition Act 2003 (Designation of Part 2 Territories) Order 2003 (S.I. 2003 No. 3334)
- The Extradition Act 2003 (Part 3 Designation) Order 2003 (S.I. 2003 No. 3335)
- The Extradition Act 2003 (Police Powers: Codes of Practice) Order 2003 (S.I. 2003 No. 3336)
- The Criminal Justice (Sentencing) (Licence Conditions) Order 2003 (S.I. 2003 No. 3337)
- The Watford and South of St Albans–Redbourn–Kidney Wood, Luton (Special Road Scheme 1957) (Park Street to Beechtrees Partial Revocation) Scheme 2004 (S.I. 2003 No. 3339)
- The Enterprise Act 2002 (Commencement No. 5 and Amendment) Order 2003 (S.I. 2003 No. 3340 (C. 132)])
- The United Utilities Water plc (Ullswater) (Drought) Order 2003 (S.I. 2003 No. 3341)
- The Veterinary Surgeons and Veterinary Practitioners (Registration) Regulations Order of Council 2003 (S.I. 2003 No. 3342)
- The Local Government Best Value (Exemption) (England) Order 2003 (S.I. 2003 No. 3343)
- The Conditional Fee Agreements (Miscellaneous Amendments) (No. 2) Regulations 2003 (S.I. 2003 No. 3344)
- The Courts Act 2003 (Commencement No. 1) Order 2003 (S.I. 2003 No. 3345 (C. 133)])
- The Health and Social Care (Community Health and Standards) Act 2003 Commencement (No. 1) Order 2003 (S.I. 2003 No. 3346 (C. 134 )])
- The Employment Relations Act 1999 (Commencement No. 9) Order 2003 (S.I. 2003 No. 3357 (C. 135)])
- The Civil Procedure (Amendment No. 5) Rules 2003 (S.I. 2003 No. 3361 (L. 38)])
- The European Parliamentary Elections (Returning Officers) Order 2003 (S.I. 2003 No. 3362)
- The Insolvency Practitioners and Insolvency Services Account (Fees) Order 2003 (S.I. 2003 No. 3363)
- The Alconbury Airfield (Rail Facilities and Connection to East Coast Main Line) Order 2003 (S.I. 2003 No. 3364)
- The Family Proceedings Courts (Constitution) (Amendment) Rules 2003 (S.I. 2003 No. 3367 (L39))

== See also ==
- List of statutory instruments of the United Kingdom
