= Pearce v Mayfield Secondary School Governing Body =

Macdonald v Advocate General for Scotland, Pearce v Governing Body of Mayfield School
- Court: House of Lords
- Decided: 19 June 2003
- Citations: [2003] ICR 937, [2003] ELR 655, 2003 SLT 1158, 2003 SC (HL) 35, [2003] UKHL 34, 2003 GWD 23-677, [2003] IRLR 512, [2004] 1 All ER 339, 2003 SCLR 814

Case history
- Prior action: [2001] EWCA Civ 1347

Court membership
- Judges sitting: Lord Nicholls of Birkenhead, Lord Hope of Craighead, Lord Hobhouse of Woodborough, Lord Scott of Foscote and Lord Rodger of Earlsferry

Pearce v Mayfield Secondary School Governing Body and Advocate General for Scotland v MacDonald [2003] UKHL 34; [2003] IRLR 512 is a UK labour law case concerning sexuality and sex discrimination. It was decided before the new Employment Equality (Sexual Orientation) Regulations 2003.

== Facts ==
Pearce is a lesbian who was harassed by pupils for it. MacDonald was a gay pilot for the RAF, forced to resign after he came out. They both claimed they had been discriminated against on grounds of their sex.

== Judgment ==
The Sex Discrimination Act 1975 does not cover sexuality discrimination. The Act was always meant to cover gender, not sexuality, and the comparators were gay people of the opposite sex. It was held that a gay man was the correct comparator for Pearce, and he would have been treated the same. Moreover, for the school, pupils were not agents, and so the school was not vicariously liable.

28. This submission, although not calling for decision, raises a point of some general importance. In Burton v De Vere Hotels Ltd [1997] ICR 1 two black waitresses, clearing tables in the banqueting hall of a hotel, were the butt of racist and sexist jibes made by a guest speaker entertaining the assembled all-male company at a private dinner party. The Employment Appeal Tribunal held that the employer of the waitresses had racially discriminated against the waitresses. Had the assistant managers in charge for the evening been properly instructed, the two young women would not have suffered embarrassment. They could, and should, have been withdrawn from the room.

29. This is not a satisfactory decision. Lindsay J, sitting as the President of the Employment Appeal Tribunal, has said the decision may be 'vulnerable': see Hussain v HM Prison Service (8 May 2002, unreported). Viewed in the broadest terms, the Burton decision has much to commend it. There is, surely, everything to be said in favour of a conclusion which requires employers to take reasonable steps to protect employees from racial or sexual abuse by third parties. But is a failure to do so 'discrimination' by the employer? Where the Burton decision is, indeed, vulnerable is that it treats an employer's inadvertent failure to take such steps as discrimination even though the failure had nothing to do with the sex or race of the employees. In this crucially important respect the decision gives insufficient heed to the statutory discrimination provisions. An essential element of 'direct' sex discrimination by an employer is that, on the grounds of sex, the employer treats the employee less favourably than he treats or would treat an employee of the opposite sex. Similarly with 'direct' racial discrimination: the 'less favourable treatment' comparison is an essential ingredient of the statutory wrong: see section 1(1)(a) of the Race Relations Act 1976. Unless the employer's conduct satisfies this 'less favourable treatment' test, the employer is not guilty of direct sex or racial discrimination. In making this comparison acts of persons for whose conduct an employer is vicariously responsible are to be attributed to the employer. It is otherwise in respect of acts of third parties for whose conduct the employer is not vicariously liable.

30. With this in mind, the reasoning in the Burton decision is unsatisfactory in two important respects. First, the tribunal proceeded on the basis that harassment which is race specific in form is itself less favourable treatment on racial grounds. In the case of racial harassment of a black person there is no need to show that a white person would have been treated differently. Counsel's concession on this point was based on an apparently widespread misinterpretation of the decision in Strathclyde Regional Council v Porcelli [1986] SC 137; [1986] ICR 564. This is a point I have already discussed.

31. Secondly, the harassment in Burton was committed by third parties for whose conduct the employer was not vicariously responsible. Despite this, the tribunal seems to have proceeded on the basis that the racial harassment of the waitresses by the speaker and some of the guests constituted discrimination on the part of the employer, and that the only issue left outstanding on the appeal, if the discrimination claim were to succeed, was whether the employers had by active or passive conduct subjected the waitresses to racial harassment by the speaker and the offending guests. This cannot be right. In order to succeed the two Caribbean waitresses had to prove discrimination by their employer.

== See also ==
- UK employment discrimination law
- UK labour law
- Human Rights Act 1998
