= St Helen's BC v Derbyshire =

UK legal case

St Helen’s BC v Derbyshire
- Court: House of Lords
- Decided: 25 April 2007
- Citations: [2007] UKHL 16, [2007] ICR 841

Case opinions
- Lord Neuberger, Lord Bingham, Lord Hope, Baroness Hale and Lord Carswell

Keywords
- Discrimination

St Helen's Borough Council v Derbyshire [2007] UKHL 16 is a UK labour law case concerning victimisation, which now falls under section 27 of the Equality Act 2010.

== Facts ==
470 women had brought equal pay claims against St Helen's MBC. Most had settled, and shared a lump sum of compensation, but Ms Derbyshire with 38 others had continued. The council had sent two letters, one of which said that if they pursued the claim it could threaten school dinners and lead to redundancies in the workforce.

Employment Tribunal held that this was victimisation because the letter ‘amounted to an attempt to induce the acquiescence of individuals despite the view of their union’. The Court of Appeal reversed the finding.

== Judgment ==
The House of Lords allowed the appeal. The court should focus on the word ‘detriment’ under SDA 1975 s 4. It is difficult to imagine how an ‘honest and reasonable’ action by an employer could lead to ‘detriment’ on the employee's part. So here, the employment tribunal had reached a justifiable answer.

Lord Neuberger said Chief Constable of West Yorkshire v Khan was correct, but its juridical analysis and its subsequent interpretation were not entirely satisfactory. The more appropriate approach was to ask whether the worker had suffered a detriment. First, the ‘honest and reasonable employer’ test is not at all in the legislation. Second, the meaning on ‘by reason that’ is uncomfortable. And third, it shifts the considerations more to the side of whether the perpetrator viewed the act as victimisation. Instead, it was better to follow, which Lord Hoffmann in Khan approved, Brightman LJ in Ministry of Defence v Jeremiah that ‘a detriment exists if a reasonable worker would or might take the view that the [treatment] was in all the circumstances to his detriment’. He gave the example of a ‘measured and accurate’ letter from a solicitor setting out financial consequences if a claim succeeds or fails not being able to constitute detriment. And detriment is not mere mental distress because it ought to be reasonable.

Lord Bingham, Lord Hope, Baroness Hale and Lord Carswell gave concurring opinions.

== See also ==
- UK labour law
- UK employment equality law
