= Shamoon v Chief Constable of the Royal Ulster Constabulary =

Labour Law Case in the United Kingdom

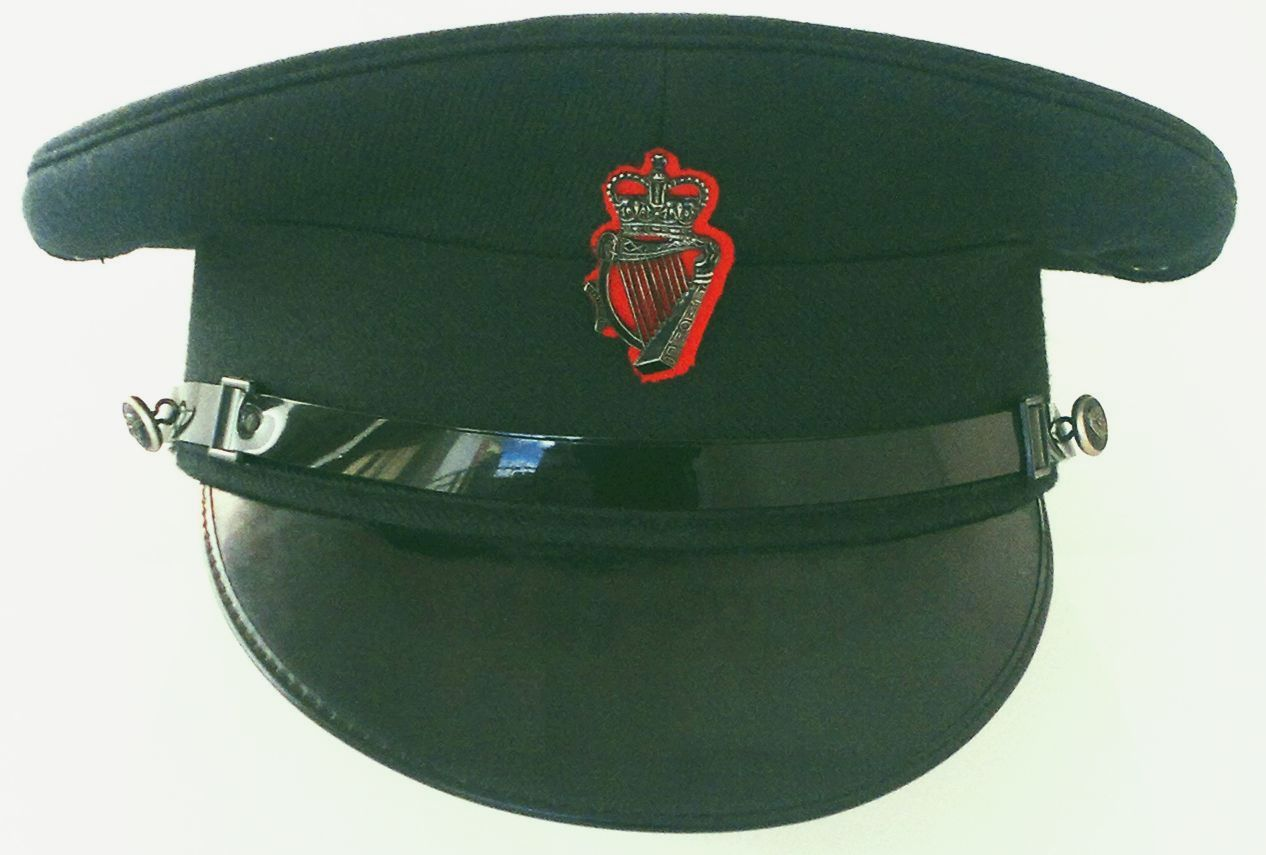
- Court: House of Lords
- Decided: 27 February 2003
- Citations: [2003] UKHL 11, [2003] ICR 337

Case opinions
- Lord Hope, Lord Nicholls

Keywords
- Discrimination

Shamoon v Chief Constable of the Royal Ulster Constabulary [2003] UKHL 11 is a UK labour law case concerning the appropriate test for determining who is a comparator.

== Facts ==
Ms Shamoon was a chief inspector in the police force, where part of her duties included conducting appraisals of other police officers. Her appraisal duties were removed from her after complaints were made about the way she did them. She was dismissed and made a claim under the Sex Discrimination (Northern Ireland) Order 1976, which is the same as the SDA 1975, and now found in the Equality Act 2010.

The Employment Tribunal held that there was sex discrimination. It said that the appropriate comparators were two male chief inspectors who were in the same branch and had the same duties, in which they continued, but who had not had complaints against them. The Northern Ireland Court of Appeal held that her claim failed because the two comparators she pointed to who had done similar appraisals had had no complaints made against them.

== Judgment ==
The House of Lords held that the comparators were inappropriate because there had been no complaints about them. Lord Hope agreed that the comparators were inappropriate. He noted that choosing which characteristics are relevant for the purposes of comparison should not defeat the purpose of the legislation, ‘which is to eliminate discrimination against women on the ground of their sex in all areas with which it deals.’

Lord Nicholls said that tribunals,

may sometimes be able to avoid arid and confusing disputes about the identification of the appropriate comparator by concentrating primarily on why the claimant was treated as she was. Was it on the proscribed ground which is the foundation of the application? That will call for an examination of all the facts of the case. Or was it for some other reason? If the latter, the application fails. If the former, there will be usually no difficulty in deciding whether the treatment, afforded to the claimant on the proscribed ground, was less favourable than was or would have been afforded to others.

== See also ==
- UK labour law
- UK employment equality law
