= English v Thomas Sanderson Ltd =

English v Sanderson Blinds Ltd
- Court: Court of Appeal
- Decided: 19 December 2008
- Transcript: Full text of judgment

Case history
- Prior action: [2008] UKEAT/0556/07/LA

Case opinions
- Laws LJ, Sedley LJ, Collins LJ

English v Sanderson Blinds Ltd [2008] EWCA Civ 1421 is a UK labour law case on the question of whether a person can claim discrimination for sexuality without being (or without revealing that one is) actually gay. The Court of Appeal decided that it was irrelevant whether someone was gay or not or the bullies believe the person is gay or not, if the harassment has sexuality as its focus.

== Facts ==
Stephen English, who lived in Brighton, was a heterosexual married man with three children who worked for Thomas Sanderson Ltd between 1996 and August 2005, when he left voluntarily. He went to an Employment Tribunal, claiming harassment in the workplace under section 5 of the Employment Equality (Sexual Orientation) Regulations 2003, alleging that he had been the subject of homophobic mockery, but the tribunal rejected his claim because he admitted that none of his colleagues had actually thought he was gay. He was represented by Frederic Reynold QC.

== Judgment ==
=== Employment Appeal Tribunal ===
At the Employment Appeal Tribunal, Peter-Clark J held he was not persuaded any material difference existed between the "on grounds" provisions in the Sex Discrimination Act and the Employment Equality (Sexual Orientation) Regulations 2003. He held the Regulations do not properly implement the Directive (at 21), as was held by Burton J in EOC v. SS for Trade and Industry [2007] IRLR 327. So people should be allowed to claim even when they are not themselves gay.

However, he then said that the claimant’s difficulty was that nobody thought he was gay (at 23), so that the harassment was not on grounds of sexual orientation at all. It was a ‘vehicle for teasing the Claimant’ (at 24). He then said ‘without deciding the point, that the result may have been different on direct application of the Directive’.

=== Court of Appeal ===
The Court of Appeal by a majority applied the Directive directly, overturning the EAT's decision. Laws LJ gave the first judgment, and dissented, saying there was no harassment under regulation 5. Sedley LJ found that there was harassment,

In my judgment it did not matter whether he was gay or not. The calculated insult to his dignity, which depended not at all on his actual sexuality, and the consequently intolerable working environment were sufficient to bring his case both within Regulation 5 and within the 1976 Directive. The incessant mockery ("banter" trivialises it) created a degrading and hostile working environment, and it did so on grounds of sexual orientation. That is the way I would prefer to put it. Alternatively, however, it can be properly said that the fact that the appellant is not gay, and that his tormentors know it, has just as much to do with sexual orientation – his own, as it happens - as if he were gay. If, as is common ground, tormenting a man who is believed to be gay but is not amounts to unlawful harassment, the distance from there to tormenting a man who is being treated as if he were gay when he is not is barely perceptible. In both cases the man's sexual orientation, in both cases imaginary, is the basis – that is to say, the ground - of the harassment. There is no Pandora's box here: simply a consistent application of the principle that, while you cannot legislate against prejudice, you can set out in specified circumstances to stop people's lives being made a misery by it.

Lawrence Collins LJ agreed with Sedley LJ, and said there was harassment.

== See also ==
- Employment discrimination law in the UK
