= Lambeth LBC v Commission for Racial Equality =

- Court: Court of Appeal
- Citation: [1990] ICR 768

Lambeth LBC v Commission for Racial Equality [1990] ICR 768 is a UK labour law concerning exceptions from the rules prohibiting discrimination, now found in the Equality Act 2010 Schedule 9.

== Facts ==
The Council reserved two positions for Afro-Caribbean or Asian applicants in the housing department. These groups were 50% of the council's tenants. The Council wanted to be ‘more sensitive to the needs and experiences of black people’. Tribunal held that because the jobs involved limited contact with the public they did not involve ‘personal services’ under the Race Relations Act 1976 s 5(2)(d). The Employment Appeals Tribunal rejected the appeal.

== Judgment ==
Balcombe LJ looked at the dictionary definitions of ‘personal’ and said it would matter if there was face to face contact. It is a question of mixed law and fact. He found no error of law by the tribunal.

Mann LJ and Mustill LJ concurred.

== See also ==
- UK employment discrimination law
- UK labour law
