= Sex Discrimination Act =

The Sex Discrimination Act may refer to:

- Sex Discrimination Act 1975, in the UK
- Sex Discrimination (Election Candidates) Act 2002, in the UK
- Sex Discrimination Act 1984, in Australia
- The Sex Disqualification (Removal) Act 1919 in the United Kingdom.
