= List of Scottish statutory instruments, 2012 =

This is a complete list of Scottish statutory instruments in 2012.

== 1-100 ==
- The Children's Hearings (Scotland) Act 2011 (Commencement No. 3) Order 2012 (S.S.I. 2012 No. 1 (C. 1))
- The Private Rented Housing (Scotland) Act 2011 (Commencement No. 2 and Transitional Provision) Order 2012 (S.S.I. 2012 No. 2 (C. 2))
- The Specified Products from China (Restriction on First Placing on the Market) (Scotland) Amendment Regulations 2012 (S.S.I. 2012 No. 3)
- The Sea Fish (Prohibited Methods of Fishing) (Firth of Clyde) Order 2012 (S.S.I. 2012 No. 4)
- The Fodder Plant Seed (Scotland) Amendment Regulations 2012 (S.S.I. 2012 No. 5)
- The Conservation of Salmon (River Annan Salmon Fishery District) (Scotland) Regulations 2012 (S.S.I. 2012 No. 6)
- Act of Sederunt (Fees of Sheriff Officers) (Amendment) 2012 (S.S.I. 2012 No. 7)
- Act of Sederunt (Fees of Messengers-at-Arms) (Amendment) 2012 (S.S.I. 2012 No. 8)
- The National Health Service (General Medical Services Contracts) (Scotland) Amendment Regulations 2012 (S.S.I. 2012 No. 9)
- The National Health Service (Primary Medical Services Section 17C Agreements) (Scotland) Amendment Regulations 2012 (S.S.I. 2012 No. 10)
- The Scottish Road Works Register (Prescribed Fees) Regulations 2012 (S.S.I. 2012 No. 11)
- The South West Scotland Trunk Roads (Temporary Prohibitions of Traffic and Overtaking and Temporary Speed Restrictions) (No.1) Order 2012 (S.S.I. 2012 No. 12)
- The South East Scotland Trunk Roads (Temporary Prohibitions of Traffic and Overtaking and Temporary Speed Restrictions) (No. 1) Order 2012 (S.S.I. 2012 No. 13)
- The North West Scotland Trunk Roads (Temporary Prohibitions of Traffic and Overtaking and Temporary Speed Restrictions) (No. 1) Order 2012 (S.S.I. 2012 No. 14)
- The North East Scotland Trunk Roads (Temporary Prohibitions of Traffic and Overtaking and Temporary Speed Restrictions) (No.1) Order 2012 (S.S.I. 2012 No. 15)
- The Representation of the People (Variation of Limits of Candidates’ Local Government Election Expenses) (Scotland) Order 2012 (S.S.I. 2012 No. 16)
- The A77 Trunk Road (Cairnryan) (Temporary 30 mph Speed Limit) Order 2012 (S.S.I. 2012 No. 17)
- The A84 Trunk Road (Main Street and Leny Road, Callander) (Temporary Prohibition of Waiting, Loading and Unloading) Order 2012 (S.S.I. 2012 No. 18)
- The Housing (Scotland) Act 2010 (Commencement No. 5) Order 2012 (S.S.I. 2012 No. 19 (C. 3))
- The Offensive Behaviour at Football and Threatening Communications (Scotland) Act 2012 (Commencement) Order 2012 (S.S.I. 2012 No. 20 (C. 4))
- The Public Records (Scotland) Act 2011 (Commencement No. 1) Order 2012 (S.S.I. 2012 No. 21 (C. 5))
- The Repayment of Student Loans (Scotland) Amendment Regulations 2012 (S.S.I. 2012 No. 22)
- The Children's Hearings (Scotland) Act 2011 (Commencement No. 4) Order 2012 (S.S.I. 2012 No. 23 (C. 6))
- The Less Favoured Area Support Scheme (Scotland) Amendment Regulations 2012 (S.S.I. 2012 No. 24)
- The Marine Licensing (Exempted Activities) (Scottish Inshore and Offshore Regions) Amendment Order 2012 (S.S.I. 2012 No. 25)
- The Prisons and Young Offenders Institutions (Scotland) Amendment Rules 2012 (S.S.I. 2012 No. 26)
- The Non-Domestic Rate (Scotland) Order 2012 (S.S.I. 2012 No. 27)
- The Non-Domestic Rates (Levying) (Scotland) Regulations 2012 (S.S.I. 2012 No. 28)
- The Non-Domestic Rates (Levying) (Scotland) (No. 2) Regulations 2012 (S.S.I. 2012 No. 29)
- The Title Conditions (Scotland) Act 2003 (Conservation Bodies) Amendment Order 2012 (S.S.I. 2012 No. 30)
- The Local Electoral Administration (Scotland) Act 2011 (Consequential Amendments) Order 2012 (S.S.I. 2012 No. 31)
- The Public Service Vehicles (Registration of Local Services) (Scotland) Amendment Regulations 2012 (S.S.I. 2012 No. 32)
- The Bus Service Operators Grant (Scotland) Amendment Regulations 2012 (S.S.I. 2012 No. 33)
- The Home Energy Assistance Scheme (Scotland) Amendment Regulations 2012 (S.S.I. 2012 No. 34)
- The Patient Rights (Scotland) Act 2011 (Commencement) Order 2012 (S.S.I. 2012 No. 35 (C. 7))
- The Patient Rights (Complaints Procedure and Consequential Provisions) (Scotland) Regulations 2012 (S.S.I. 2012 No. 36)
- The Potatoes Originating in Egypt (Scotland) Amendment Regulations 2012 (S.S.I. 2012 No. 37)
- The Housing (Scotland) Act 2010 (Consequential Modifications) Order 2012 (S.S.I. 2012 No. 38)
- The Housing (Scotland) Act 2010 (Commencement No. 6, Transitional and Savings Provisions) Order 2012 (S.S.I. 2012 No. 39 (C. 8))
- The Prohibited Procedures on Protected Animals (Exemptions) (Scotland) Amendment Regulations 2012 (S.S.I. 2012 No. 40)
- The Local Government Finance (Scotland) Order 2012 (S.S.I. 2012 No. 41)
- The Public Records (Scotland) Act 2011 (Commencement No. 1) Amendment Order 2012 (S.S.I. 2012 No. 42 (C. 9))
- The Scottish Public Services Ombudsman Act 2002 Amendment Order 2012 (S.S.I. 2012 No. 43)
- The Social Care and Social Work Improvement Scotland (Excepted Services) Regulations 2012 (S.S.I. 2012 No. 44)
- The Public Services Reform (Social Services Inspections) (Scotland) Amendment Regulations 2012 (S.S.I. 2012 No. 45)
- The A9 Trunk Road (Inshes Junction) (Temporary 30mph Restriction of Speed) Order 2012 (S.S.I. 2012 No. 46)
- The A9 Trunk Road (Dunkeld Junction) (Temporary Prohibition of Traffic, Temporary Prohibition of Overtaking and Temporary Speed Restriction) Order 2012 (S.S.I. 2012 No. 47)
- The Non-Domestic Rates (Enterprise Areas) (Scotland) Regulations 2012 (S.S.I. 2012 No. 48)
- The Police Grant and Variation (Scotland) Order 2012 (S.S.I. 2012 No. 49)
- The Sexual Offences Act 2003 (Prescribed Police Stations) (Scotland) Amendment Regulations 2012 (S.S.I. 2012 No. 50)
- The A82 Trunk Road (Pulpit Rock Improvement) Order 2012 (S.S.I. 2012 No. 51)
- The A82 Trunk Road (Pulpit Rock Improvement) (Stopping Up) Order 2012 (S.S.I. 2012 No. 52)
- The Water Services Charges (Billing and Collection) (Scotland) Order 2012 (S.S.I. 2012 No. 53)
- The Children's Hearings (Scotland) Act 2011 (Safeguarders Panel) Regulations 2012 (S.S.I. 2012 No. 54)
- The Equality Act 2010 (Specification of Public Authorities) (Scotland) Order 2012 (S.S.I. 2012 No. 55)
- The South East Scotland Trunk Roads (Temporary Prohibitions of Traffic and Overtaking and Temporary Speed Restrictions) (No. 2) Order 2012 (S.S.I. 2012 No. 56)
- The South West Scotland Trunk Roads (Temporary Prohibitions of Traffic and Overtaking and Temporary Speed Restrictions) (No. 2) Order 2012 (S.S.I. 2012 No. 57)
- The North East Scotland Trunk Roads (Temporary Prohibitions of Traffic and Overtaking and Temporary Speed Restrictions) (No. 2) Order 2012 (S.S.I. 2012 No. 58)
- The North West Scotland Trunk Roads (Temporary Prohibitions of Traffic and Overtaking and Temporary Speed Restrictions) (No. 2) Order 2012 (S.S.I. 2012 No. 59)
- The Scottish Local Government Elections Amendment Order 2012 (S.S.I. 2012 No. 60)
- The Representation of the People (Post-Local Government Elections Supply and Inspection of Documents) (Scotland) Amendment Regulations 2012 (S.S.I. 2012 No. 61)
- The A720 Edinburgh City Bypass and M8 (Hermiston Junction) (Speed Limit) Regulations 2012 (S.S.I. 2012 No. 62)
- The Sharks, Skates and Rays (Prohibition of Fishing, Trans-shipment and Landing) (Scotland) Order 2012 (S.S.I. 2012 No. 63)
- The Civil Legal Aid (Scotland) Amendment Regulations 2012 (S.S.I. 2012 No. 64)
- The Community Care (Joint Working etc.) (Scotland) Amendment Regulations 2012 (S.S.I. 2012 No. 65)
- The Community Care and Health (Scotland) Act 2002 (Incidental Provision) (Adult Support and Protection) Order 2012 (S.S.I. 2012 No. 66)
- The National Assistance (Sums for Personal Requirements) (Scotland) Regulations 2012 (S.S.I. 2012 No. 67)
- The National Assistance (Assessment of Resources) Amendment (Scotland) Regulations 2012 (S.S.I. 2012 No. 68)
- The National Health Service (Superannuation Scheme and Pension Scheme) (Scotland) Amendment Regulations 2012 (S.S.I. 2012 No. 69)
- The Teachers’ Superannuation (Scotland) Amendment Regulations 2012 (S.S.I. 2012 No. 70)
- The Police Pensions (Contributions) Amendment (Scotland) Regulations 2012 (S.S.I. 2012 No. 71)
- The Education (Fees, Awards and Student Support) (Miscellaneous Amendments) (Scotland) Regulations 2012 (S.S.I. 2012 No. 72)
- The National Health Service (Optical Charges and Payments) (Scotland) Amendment Regulations 2012 (S.S.I. 2012 No. 73)
- The National Health Service (Free Prescriptions and Charges for Drugs and Appliances) (Scotland) Amendment Regulations 2012 (S.S.I. 2012 No. 74)
- The Food Hygiene (Scotland) Amendment Regulations 2012 (S.S.I. 2012 No. 75)
- The Personal Injuries (NHS Charges) (Amounts) (Scotland) Amendment Regulations 2012 (S.S.I. 2012 No. 76)
- The Forestry Commissioners (Climate Change Functions) (Scotland) Order 2012 (S.S.I. 2012 No. 77)
- The Bovine Viral Diarrhoea (Scotland) Order 2012 (S.S.I. 2012 No. 78)
- The M9/A90/M90 Trunk Road (Balmedie to Tipperty) (Trunking and Detrunking) Order 2012 (S.S.I. 2012 No. 79)
- The M9/A90/M90 Trunk Road (Balmedie to Tipperty) (Side Roads) Order 2012 (S.S.I. 2012 No. 80)
- The M9/A90/M90 Trunk Road (Easter Hatton Link) (Stopping Up of Accesses) Order 2012 (S.S.I. 2012 No. 81)
- The M9/A90/M90 Trunk Road (Easter Hatton Link) (Prohibition of Specified Turns) Order 2012 (S.S.I. 2012 No. 82)
- The M9/A90/M90 Trunk Road (Balmedie to Tipperty) (Prohibition of Specified Turns) Order 2012 (S.S.I. 2012 No. 83)
- The Advice and Assistance (Assistance By Way of Representation) (Scotland) Amendment Regulations 2012 (S.S.I. 2012 No. 84)
- The Scottish Public Services Ombudsman Act 2002 Amendment (No. 2) Order 2012 (S.S.I. 2012 No. 85)
- The General Teaching Council for Scotland (Legal Assessor) Rules 2012 (S.S.I. 2012 No. 86)
- The National Health Service (Charges to Overseas Visitors) (Scotland) Amendment Regulations 2012 (S.S.I. 2012 No. 87)
- The Public Contracts (Scotland) Regulations 2012 (S.S.I. 2012 No. 88)
- The Utilities Contracts (Scotland) Regulations 2012 (S.S.I. 2012 No. 89)
- The Town and Country Planning (Continuation in force of Local Plans) (Highland) (Scotland) Order 2012 (S.S.I. 2012 No. 90)
- The Housing (Scotland) Act 2010 (Commencement No. 7 and Transitional Provision) Order 2012 (S.S.I. 2012 No. 91 (C. 10))
- The Scottish Secure Tenancies (Proceedings for Possession) (Form of Notice) Regulations 2012 (S.S.I. 2012 No. 92)
- The Scottish Secure Tenancies (Proceedings for Possession) (Confirmation of Compliance with Pre-Action Requirements) Regulations 2012 (S.S.I. 2012 No. 93)
- The Local Government Finance (Scotland) Amendment Order 2012 (S.S.I. 2012 No. 94)
- The South West Scotland Trunk Roads (Temporary Prohibitions of Traffic and Overtaking and Temporary Speed Restrictions) (No.3) Order 2012 (S.S.I. 2012 No. 95)
- The South East Scotland Trunk Roads (Temporary Prohibitions of Traffic and Overtaking and Temporary Speed Restrictions) (No.3) Order 2012 (S.S.I. 2012 No. 96)
- The North West Scotland Trunk Roads (Temporary Prohibitions of Traffic and Overtaking and Temporary Speed Restrictions) (No.3) Order 2012 (S.S.I. 2012 No. 97)
- The North East Scotland Trunk Roads (Temporary Prohibitions of Traffic and Overtaking and Temporary Speed Restrictions) (No.3) Order 2012 (S.S.I. 2012 No. 98)
- The Adoption and Children (Scotland) Act 2007 (Commencement No. 4, Transitional and Savings Provisions) Amendment Order 2012 (S.S.I. 2012 No. 99)
- Act of Sederunt (Rules of the Court of Session Amendment) (Fees of Shorthand Writers) 2012 (S.S.I. 2012 No. 100)

== 101-200 ==
- Act of Sederunt (Fees of Shorthand Writers in the Sheriff Court) (Amendment) 2012 (S.S.I. 2012 No. 101)
- The Public Services Reform (Recovery of Expenses in respect of Inspection of Independent Further Education Colleges and English Language Schools) (Scotland) Order 2012 (S.S.I. 2012 No. 102)
- The A77 Trunk Road (Cairnryan) (Temporary 30 mph Speed Limit) (No. 2) Order 2012 (S.S.I. 2012 No. 103)
- The A96 Trunk Road (Newtongarry) (Prohibition of Specified Turns) Order 2012 (S.S.I. 2012 No. 104)
- The Budget (Scotland) Act 2011 Amendment Order 2012 (S.S.I. 2012 No. 105)
- The Firemen’s Pension Scheme Amendment (Scotland) Order 2012 (S.S.I. 2012 No. 106)
- The Firefighters’ Pension Scheme (Scotland) Amendment Order 2012 (S.S.I. 2012 No. 107)
- The Public Contracts and Utilities Contracts (Scotland) Amendment Regulations 2012 (S.S.I. 2012 No. 108)
- The Community Care (Personal Care and Nursing Care) (Scotland) Amendment Regulations 2012 (S.S.I. 2012 No. 109)
- The Patient Rights (Treatment Time Guarantee) (Scotland) Regulations 2012 (S.S.I. 2012 No. 110)
- The Evidence in Civil Partnership and Divorce Actions (Scotland) Order 2012 (S.S.I. 2012 No. 111)
- The A720 Trunk Road (Edinburgh City Bypass) (Hermiston Junction to Calder Junction) (Speed Limit) Order 2012 (S.S.I. 2012 No. 112)
- The Housing Support Grant (Scotland) Order 2012 (S.S.I. 2012 No. 113)
- The Mallaig Harbour Revision (Constitution) Order 2012 (S.S.I. 2012 No. 114)
- The A77 Trunk Road (Cairnryan) (30 mph Speed Limit) Order 2012 (S.S.I. 2012 No. 115)
- The Wildlife and Natural Environment (Scotland) Act 2011 (Commencement No. 3) Order 2012 (S.S.I. 2012 No. 116 (C. 11))
- The Planning etc. (Scotland) Act 2006 (National Parks) (Consequential Provisions) Order 2012 (S.S.I. 2012 No. 117)
- The Bankruptcy Fees etc. (Scotland) Regulations 2012 (S.S.I. 2012 No. 118)
- The Food Additives (Scotland) Amendment Regulations 2012 (S.S.I. 2012 No. 119)
- The South West Scotland Trunk Roads (Temporary Prohibitions of Traffic and Overtaking and Temporary Speed Restrictions) (No. 4) Order 2012 (S.S.I. 2012 No. 120)
- The South East Scotland Trunk Roads (Temporary Prohibitions of Traffic and Overtaking and Temporary Speed Restrictions) (No. 4) Order 2012 (S.S.I. 2012 No. 121)
- The North East Scotland Trunk Roads (Temporary Prohibitions of Traffic and Overtaking and Temporary Speed Restrictions) (No. 4) Order 2012 (S.S.I. 2012 No. 122)
- The North West Scotland Trunk Roads (Temporary Prohibitions of Traffic and Overtaking and Temporary Speed Restrictions) (No. 4) Order 2012 (S.S.I. 2012 No. 123)
- The Snares (Training) (Scotland) Order 2012 (S.S.I. 2012 No. 124)
- Act of Adjournal (Criminal Procedure Rules Amendment) (Miscellaneous) 2012 (S.S.I. 2012 No. 125)
- Act of Sederunt (Rules of the Court of Session Amendment No. 2) (Miscellaneous) 2012 (S.S.I. 2012 No. 126)
- The Scottish Secure Tenancies (Proceedings for Possession) (Pre-Action Requirements) Order 2012 (S.S.I. 2012 No. 127)
- The Scottish Secure Tenancies (Repossession Orders) (Maximum Period) Order 2012 (S.S.I. 2012 No. 128)
- The Education (Provision of Information as to Schools) (Scotland) Revocation Regulations 2012 (S.S.I. 2012 No. 129)
- The Education (School and Placing Information) (Scotland) Regulations 2012 (S.S.I. 2012 No. 130)
- The Town and Country Planning (General Permitted Development) (Fish Farming) (Scotland) Amendment Order 2012 (S.S.I. 2012 No. 131)
- The Mental Health Tribunal for Scotland (Practice and Procedure) (No. 2) Amendment Rules 2012 (S.S.I. 2012 No. 132)
- The A702 Trunk Road (Former Petrol Filling Station, Hillend) (Prohibition of Specified Turns) Order 2012 (S.S.I. 2012 No. 133)
- The Edinburgh and West Lothian Trunk Roads (M9/A90/M90, M9/A9 and M8/A8) Temporary Speed Limits, Regulation and Prohibitions of Traffic Order 2012 (S.S.I. 2012 No. 134)
- The Food Protection (Emergency Prohibitions) (Dalgety Bay) (Scotland) Order 2012 (S.S.I. 2012 No. 135)
- Act of Sederunt (Actions for removing from heritable property) 2012 (S.S.I. 2012 No. 136)
- The Road Traffic (Permitted Parking Area and Special Parking Area) (East Ayrshire Council) Designation Order 2012 (S.S.I. 2012 No. 137)
- The Parking Attendants (Wearing of Uniforms) (East Ayrshire Council Parking Area) Regulations 2012 (S.S.I. 2012 No. 138)
- The Road Traffic (Parking Adjudicators) (East Ayrshire Council) Regulations 2012 (S.S.I. 2012 No. 139)
- The Road Traffic (Permitted Parking Area and Special Parking Area) (South Ayrshire Council) Designation Order 2012 (S.S.I. 2012 No. 140)
- The Parking Attendants (Wearing of Uniforms) (South Ayrshire Council Parking Area) Regulations 2012 (S.S.I. 2012 No. 141)
- The Road Traffic (Parking Adjudicators) (South Ayrshire Council) Regulations 2012 (S.S.I. 2012 No. 142)
- The Rural Payments (Appeals) (Scotland) Amendment Regulations 2012 (S.S.I. 2012 No. 143)
- Act of Sederunt (Summary Cause Rules Amendment) (Personal Injuries Actions) 2012 (S.S.I. 2012 No. 144)
- The A823(M) Pitreavie Spur Trunk Road (Variable Speed Limits) Regulations 2012 (S.S.I. 2012 No. 145)
- The Fire and Rescue Services (Framework) (Scotland) Order 2012 (S.S.I. 2012 No. 146)
- The M9/A90/M90 Trunk Road (Kirkliston to Halbeath) (Variable Speed Limits and Actively Managed Hard Shoulder) Regulations 2012 (S.S.I. 2012 No. 147)
- The Waste (Scotland) Regulations 2012 (S.S.I. 2012 No. 148)
- The Property Factors (Scotland) Act 2011 (Commencement No. 2 and Transitional) Order 2012 (S.S.I. 2012 No. 149 (C. 12))
- The Private Rented Housing (Scotland) Act 2011 (Commencement No. 3) Order 2012 (S.S.I. 2012 No. 150 (C. 13))
- The Private Landlord Registration (Information and Fees) (Scotland) Amendment Regulations 2012 (S.S.I. 2012 No. 151)
- The Legal Services (Scotland) Act 2010 (Commencement No. 2 and Transitional Provisions) Order 2012 (S.S.I. 2012 No. 152 (C. 14))
- The Licensed Legal Services (Complaints and Compensation Arrangements) (Scotland) Regulations 2012 (S.S.I. 2012 No. 153)
- The Licensed Legal Services (Interests in Licensed Providers) (Scotland) Regulations 2012 (S.S.I. 2012 No. 154)
- The Licensed Legal Services (Maximum Penalty and Interest in respect of Approved Regulators) (Scotland) Regulations 2012 (S.S.I. 2012 No. 155)
- The South West Scotland Trunk Roads (Temporary Prohibitions of Traffic and Overtaking and Temporary Speed Restrictions) (No. 5) Order 2012 (S.S.I. 2012 No. 156)
- The South East Scotland Trunk Roads (Temporary Prohibitions of Traffic and Overtaking and Temporary Speed Restrictions) (No. 5) Order 2012 (S.S.I. 2012 No. 157)
- The North West Scotland Trunk Roads (Temporary Prohibitions of Traffic and Overtaking and Temporary Speed Restrictions) (No. 5) Order 2012 (S.S.I. 2012 No. 158)
- The North East Scotland Trunk Roads (Temporary Prohibitions of Traffic and Overtaking and Temporary Speed Restrictions) (No. 5) Order 2012 (S.S.I. 2012 No. 159)
- The Criminal Justice and Licensing (Scotland) Act 2010 (Commencement No. 10 and Saving Provisions) Order 2012 (S.S.I. 2012 No. 160 (C. 15))
- The Snares (Training) (Scotland) (No. 2) Order 2012 (S.S.I. 2012 No. 161)
- The Equality Act 2010 (Specific Duties) (Scotland) Regulations 2012 (S.S.I. 2012 No. 162)
- The National Health Service Superannuation Scheme etc. (Miscellaneous Amendments) (Scotland) Regulations 2012 (S.S.I. 2012 No. 163)
- The Sports Grounds and Sporting Events (Designation) (Scotland) Amendment Order 2012 (S.S.I. 2012 No. 164)
- The Town and Country Planning (Development Management Procedure) (Scotland) Amendment Regulations 2012 (S.S.I. 2012 No. 165)
- The European Fisheries Fund (Grants) (Scotland) Amendment Regulations 2012 (S.S.I. 2012 No. 166)
- The Parole Board (Scotland) Amendment Rules 2012 (S.S.I. 2012 No. 167)
- The A96 Trunk Road (High Street, Elgin) (Special Event) (Temporary Prohibition of Traffic) Order 2012 (S.S.I. 2012 No. 168)
- The M8/A8 and A737/A738 Trunk Roads (White Cart Viaduct) (Temporary Prohibition of Traffic, Temporary Prohibition of Overtaking and Temporary Speed Restriction) Revocation Order 2012 (S.S.I. 2012 No. 169)
- The Adults with Incapacity (Requirements for Signing Medical Treatment Certificates) (Scotland) Amendment Regulations 2012 (S.S.I. 2012 No. 170)
- The National Health Service (Travelling Expenses and Remission of Charges) (Scotland) (No. 2) Amendment Regulations 2012 (S.S.I. 2012 No. 171)
- The Individual Learning Account (Scotland) Amendment Regulations 2012 (S.S.I. 2012 No. 172)
- The Wildlife and Countryside Act 1981 (Exceptions to section 14) (Scotland) Order 2012 (S.S.I. 2012 No. 173)
- The Wildlife and Countryside Act 1981 (Keeping and Release and Notification Requirements) (Scotland) Order 2012 (S.S.I. 2012 No. 174)
- The Wildlife and Natural Environment (Scotland) Act 2011 (Commencement No. 4, Savings and Transitional Provisions) Order 2012 (S.S.I. 2012 No. 175 (C. 16))
- The Poultry Health Scheme (Fees) (Scotland) Regulations 2012 (S.S.I. 2012 No. 176)
- The Trade in Animals and Related Products (Scotland) Regulations 2012 (S.S.I. 2012 No. 177)
- The African Horse Sickness (Scotland) Order 2012 (S.S.I. 2012 No. 178)
- The Animal By-Products (Miscellaneous Amendments) (Scotland) Regulations 2012 (S.S.I. 2012 No. 179)
- The Homeowner Housing Panel (Applications and Decisions) (Scotland) Regulations 2012 (S.S.I. 2012 No. 180)
- The Property Factors (Registration) (Scotland) Regulations 2012 (S.S.I. 2012 No. 181)
- The Leader Grants (Scotland) Amendment Regulations 2012 (S.S.I. 2012 No. 182)
- The Marine Licensing (Fees) (Scotland) Amendment Regulations 2012 (S.S.I. 2012 No. 183)
- The Bluetongue (Scotland) Amendment Order 2012 (S.S.I. 2012 No. 184)
- The A830 Trunk Road (Craigag Bridge) (Temporary Prohibition of Traffic) Order 2012 (S.S.I. 2012 No. 185)
- The A99 (South Road, Wick) (Temporary Prohibition of Waiting, Loading and Unloading) Order 2012 (S.S.I. 2012 No. 186)
- Act of Adjournal (Criminal Procedure Rules Amendment No. 2) (Miscellaneous) 2012 (S.S.I. 2012 No. 187)
- Act of Sederunt (Sheriff Court Rules) (Miscellaneous Amendments) 2012 (S.S.I. 2012 No. 188)
- Act of Sederunt (Rules of the Court of Session Amendment No. 3) (Miscellaneous) 2012 (S.S.I. 2012 No. 189)
- The Energy Performance of Buildings (Scotland) Amendment Regulations 2012 (S.S.I. 2012 No. 190)
- The Energy Act 2011 (Commencement No. 1) (Scotland) Order 2012 (S.S.I. 2012 No. 191 (C. 17))
- The Water Services etc. (Scotland) Act 2005 (Commencement No. 6) Order 2012 (S.S.I. 2012 No. 192 (C. 18))
- The Public Appointments and Public Bodies etc. (Scotland) Act 2003 (Treatment of Office or Body as Specified Authority) Order 2012 (S.S.I. 2012 No. 193)
- The Town and Country Planning (Continuation in force of South Lanarkshire Local Plan) (Scotland) Order 2012 (S.S.I. 2012 No. 194)
- The A83 Trunk Road (Poltalloch Street, Lochgilphead) (Special Event) (Temporary Prohibition of Traffic) Order 2012 (S.S.I. 2012 No. 195)
- The Official Statistics (Scotland) Amendment Order 2012 (S.S.I. 2012 No. 196)
- The Parole Board (Scotland) Amendment (No. 2) Rules 2012 (S.S.I. 2012 No. 197)
- The Trade in Animals and Related Products (Scotland) Amendment Order 2012 (S.S.I. 2012 No. 198)
- The Bluetongue (Scotland) Order 2012 (S.S.I. 2012 No. 199)
- The M9/A90/M90 Trunk Road (Gairneybridge to Milnathort) (Temporary 50 mph and 30 mph Speed Restrictions) Order 2012 (S.S.I. 2012 No. 200)

== 201-300 ==
- The South West Scotland Trunk Roads (Temporary Prohibitions of Traffic and Overtaking and Temporary Speed Restrictions) (No. 6) Order 2012 (S.S.I. 2012 No. 201)
- The South East Scotland Trunk Roads (Temporary Prohibitions of Traffic and Overtaking and Temporary Speed Restrictions) (No. 6) Order 2012 (S.S.I. 2012 No. 202)
- The North West Scotland Trunk Roads (Temporary Prohibitions of Traffic and Overtaking and Temporary Speed Restrictions) (No. 6) Order 2012 (S.S.I. 2012 No. 203)
- The North East Scotland Trunk Roads (Temporary Prohibitions of Traffic and Overtaking and Temporary Speed Restrictions) (No. 6) Order 2012 (S.S.I. 2012 No. 204)
- The Wildlife and Countryside Act 1981 (Exceptions to section 14) (Scotland) Amendment Order 2012 (S.S.I. 2012 No. 205)
- The Wildlife and Countryside Act 1981 (Keeping and Release and Notification Requirements) (Scotland) Amendment Order 2012 (S.S.I. 2012 No. 206)
- The A96 Trunk Road (Castle Stuart) (Temporary 30 mph Speed Restriction) Order 2012 (S.S.I. 2012 No. 207)
- The Energy Performance of Buildings (Scotland) Amendment (No. 2) Regulations 2012 (S.S.I. 2012 No. 208)
- The Building (Scotland) Amendment Regulations 2012 (S.S.I. 2012 No. 209)
- The Annual Close Time (Permitted Periods of Fishing) (River Dee (Aberdeenshire) Salmon Fishery District) Order 2012 (S.S.I. 2012 No. 210)
- The Mental Health (Safety and Security) (Scotland) Amendment Regulations 2012 (S.S.I. 2012 No. 211)
- The Legal Services (Scotland) Act 2010 (Ancillary Provision) Regulations 2012 (S.S.I. 2012 No. 212)
- The Licensed Legal Services (Specification of Regulated Professions) (Scotland) Regulations 2012 (S.S.I. 2012 No. 213)
- The Green Deal (Acknowledgment) (Scotland) Regulations 2012 (S.S.I. 2012 No. 214)
- The Wildlife and Natural Environment (Scotland) Act 2011 (Consequential Modifications) Order 2012 (S.S.I. 2012 No. 215)
- The Fundable Bodies (Scotland) Order 2012 (S.S.I. 2012 No. 216)
- The Property Factors (Code of Conduct) (Scotland) Order 2012 (S.S.I. 2012 No. 217)
- The Public Services Reform (Scotland) Act 2010 (Commencement No. 6) Order 2012 (S.S.I. 2012 No. 218 (C. 19))
- The Charities Restricted Funds Reorganisation (Scotland) Regulations 2012 (S.S.I. 2012 No. 219)
- The Charities Reorganisation (Scotland) Amendment Regulations 2012 (S.S.I. 2012 No. 220)
- Act of Sederunt (Sheriff Court Rules) (Miscellaneous Amendments) (No. 2) 2012 (S.S.I. 2012 No. 221)
- The A77 Trunk Road (Turnberry) (Temporary 30 mph Restriction Limit) Order 2012 (S.S.I. 2012 No. 222)
- The A96 Trunk Road (High Street, Fochabers) (Temporary Prohibition of Traffic) Order 2012 (S.S.I. 2012 No. 223)
- The South West Scotland Trunk Roads (Temporary Prohibitions of Traffic and Overtaking and Temporary Speed Restrictions) (No. 7) Order 2012 (S.S.I. 2012 No. 224)
- The South East Scotland Trunk Roads (Temporary Prohibitionsof Traffic and Overtaking and Temporary Speed Restrictions)(No. 7) Order 2012 (S.S.I. 2012 No. 225)
- The North West Scotland Trunk Roads (Temporary Prohibitionsof Traffic and Overtaking and Temporary Speed Restrictions)(No. 7) Order 2012 (S.S.I. 2012 No. 226)
- The North East Scotland Trunk Roads (Temporary Prohibitions of Traffic and Overtaking and Temporary Speed Restrictions) (No. 7) Order 2012 (S.S.I. 2012 No. 227)
- The Conservation (Natural Habitats, &c.) Amendment (Scotland) Regulations 2012 (S.S.I. 2012 No. 228)
- The M9/A90/M90 Trunk Road (North Anderson Drive, Aberdeen (Prohibition of U-Turns) Order 2012 (S.S.I. 2012 No. 229)
- The A99 (South Road, Wick) (Temporary Prohibition of Waiting, Loading and Unloading) (No. 2) Order 2012 (S.S.I. 2012 No. 230)
- The A9 Trunk Road (Inshes Junction) (30 mph Speed Limit) Order 2012 (S.S.I. 2012 No. 231)
- The South West Scotland Trunk Roads (Temporary Prohibitions of Traffic and Overtaking and Temporary Speed Restrictions) (No. 8) Order 2012 (S.S.I. 2012 No. 232)
- The South East Scotland Trunk Roads (Temporary Prohibitions of Traffic and Overtaking and Temporary Speed Restrictions) (No. 8) Order 2012 (S.S.I. 2012 No. 233)
- The North West Scotland Trunk Roads (Temporary Prohibitions of Traffic and Overtaking and Temporary Speed Restrictions) (No. 8) Order 2012 (S.S.I. 2012 No. 234)
- The North East Scotland Trunk Roads (Temporary Prohibitions of Traffic and Overtaking and Temporary Speed Restrictions) (No. 8) Order 2012 (S.S.I. 2012 No. 235)
- The Local Government Pension Scheme (Administration) (Scotland) Amendment Regulations 2012 (S.S.I. 2012 No. 236)
- The Elmwood College, Oatridge College and The Barony College (Transfer and Closure) (Scotland) Order 2012 (S.S.I. 2012 No. 237)
- The Jewel and Esk College and Stevenson College Edinburgh (Transfer and Closure) (Scotland) Order 2012 (S.S.I. 2012 No. 238)
- The A82 Trunk Road (Crianlarich Bypass) Order 2012 (S.S.I. 2012 No. 239)
- The A82 Trunk Road (Crianlarich Bypass) (Side Road) Order 2012 (S.S.I. 2012 No. 240)
- The A82 Trunk Road (Crianlarich Western Bypass) Revocation Order 2012 (S.S.I. 2012 No. 241)
- The A82 Trunk Road (Crianlarich Western Bypass) (Side Roads) Revocation Order 2012 (S.S.I. 2012 No. 242)
- The Bathing Waters (Scotland) Amendment Regulations 2012 (S.S.I. 2012 No. 243)
- The A92 Trunk Road (Leuchars) (Temporary 30 mph Speed Restriction) Order 2012 (S.S.I. 2012 No. 244)
- Act of Sederunt (Registration Appeal Court) 2012 (S.S.I. 2012 No. 245)
- The Children's Hearings (Scotland) Act 2011 (Commencement No. 5) Order 2012 (S.S.I. 2012 No. 246 (C. 20))
- The Public Records (Scotland) Act 2011 (Commencement No. 2) Order 2012 (S.S.I. 2012 No. 247 (C. 21))
- The A9 (Olrig Street/Smith Terrace/Pennyland Terrace, Thurso) (Temporary Prohibition of Waiting and Loading) Order 2012 (S.S.I. 2012 No. 248)
- The Criminal Cases (Punishment and Review) (Scotland) Act 2012 (Commencement, Transitional and Savings) Order 2012 (S.S.I. 2012 No. 249 (C. 22))
- The Road Works (Inspection Fees) (Scotland) Amendment Regulations 2012 (S.S.I. 2012 No. 250)
- The A82 Trunk Road (Drumnadrochit to Fort Augustus) (Temporary Prohibition of Traffic) Order 2012 (S.S.I. 2012 No. 251)
- The Children's Hearings (Scotland) Act 2011 (Commencement No. 6) Order 2012 (S.S.I. 2012 No. 252 (C. 23))
- The Police and Fire Reform (Scotland) Act 2012 (Commencement No. 1, Transitional, Transitory and Saving Provisions) Order 2012 (S.S.I. 2012 No. 253 (C. 24))
- The South West Scotland Trunk Roads (Temporary Prohibitions of Traffic and Overtaking and Temporary Speed Restrictions) (No. 9) Order 2012 (S.S.I. 2012 No. 254)
- The South East Scotland Trunk Roads (Temporary Prohibitions of Traffic and Overtaking and Temporary Speed Restrictions) (No.9) Order 2012 (S.S.I. 2012 No. 255)
- The North West Scotland Trunk Roads (Temporary Prohibitions of Traffic and Overtaking and Temporary Speed Restrictions) (No. 9) Order 2012 (S.S.I. 2012 No. 256)
- The North East Scotland Trunk Roads (Temporary Prohibitions of Traffic and Overtaking and Temporary Speed Restrictions) (No. 9) Order 2012 (S.S.I. 2012 No. 257)
- The Housing (Scotland) Act 2001 (Assistance to Registered Social Landlords and Other Persons) (Grants) Amendment Regulations 2012 (S.S.I. 2012 No. 258)
- The Town and Country Planning (Marine Fish Farming) (Scotland) Amendment Regulations 2012 (S.S.I. 2012 No. 259)
- The Town and Country Planning (Prescribed Date) (Scotland) Regulations 2012 (S.S.I. 2012 No. 260)
- The Glasgow Commonwealth Games Act 2008 (Commencement No. 3) Order 2012 (S.S.I. 2012 No. 261 (C. 25))
- The Fraserburgh Harbour Revision (Constitution) Order 2012 (S.S.I. 2012 No. 262)
- The Food Protection (Emergency Prohibitions) (Radioactivity in Sheep) and the Export of Sheep (Prohibition) Revocation (Scotland) Order 2012 (S.S.I. 2012 No. 263)
- The Fishing Boats (Satellite-tracking Devices) (Scotland) Scheme 2012 (S.S.I. 2012 No. 264)
- The Land Registration etc. (Scotland) Act 2012 (Commencement No. 1) Order 2012 (S.S.I. 2012 No. 265 (C. 26))
- The Plant Health (Scotland) Amendment Order 2012 (S.S.I. 2012 No. 266)
- The Private Rented Housing (Scotland) Act 2011 (Commencement No. 4) Order 2012 (S.S.I. 2012 No. 267 (C. 27))
- The A737 Trunk Road (Kilwinning) (30 mph Speed Limit) and Kilwinning Academy and Abbey Primary School (Part-Time 20 mph Speed Limit) Order 2012 (S.S.I. 2012 No. 268)
- The Property Factors (Scotland) Act 2011 (Modification) Order 2012 (S.S.I. 2012 No. 269)
- Act of Sederunt (Rules of the Court of Session Amendment No. 4) (Fees of Solicitors) 2012 (S.S.I. 2012 No. 270)
- Act of Sederunt (Sheriff Court Rules) (Miscellaneous Amendments) (No. 3) 2012 (S.S.I. 2012 No. 271)
- Act of Adjournal (Amendment of the Criminal Procedure (Scotland) Act 1995) (Transcripts) 2012 (S.S.I. 2012 No. 272)
- Act of Sederunt (Actions for removing from heritable property) (Amendment) 2012 (S.S.I. 2012 No. 273)
- The Criminal Proceedings etc. (Reform) (Scotland) Act 2007 (Commencement No. 10) Order 2012 (S.S.I. 2012 No. 274 (C. 28))
- Act of Sederunt (Rules of the Court of Session Amendment No. 5) (Miscellaneous) 2012 (S.S.I. 2012 No. 275)
- The Criminal Legal Aid (Scotland) (Fees) Amendment Regulations 2012 (S.S.I. 2012 No. 276)
- The North West Scotland Trunk Roads (Temporary Prohibitions of Traffic and Overtaking and Temporary Speed Restrictions) (No. 10) Order 2012 (S.S.I. 2012 No. 277)
- The North East Scotland Trunk Roads (Temporary Prohibitions of Traffic and Overtaking and Temporary Speed Restrictions) (No. 10) Order 2012 (S.S.I. 2012 No. 278)
- The South West Scotland Trunk Roads (Temporary Prohibitions of Traffic and Overtaking and Temporary Speed Restrictions) (No. 10) Order 2012 (S.S.I. 2012 No. 279)
- The South East Scotland Trunk Roads (Temporary Prohibitions of Traffic and Overtaking and Temporary Speed Restrictions) (No. 10) Order 2012 (S.S.I. 2012 No. 280)
- The Wildlife and Natural Environment (Scotland) Act 2011 (Commencement No. 2) Amendment (No. 2) Order 2012 (S.S.I. 2012 No. 281 (C. 29))
- The Snares (Identification Numbers and Tags) (Scotland) Order 2012 (S.S.I. 2012 No. 282)
- The Housing (Scotland) Act 2010 (Commencement No. 8 and Saving Provision) Order 2012 (S.S.I. 2012 No. 283 (C. 30))
- The INSPIRE (Scotland) Amendment Regulations 2012 (S.S.I. 2012 No. 284)
- The Town and Country Planning (General Permitted Development) (Fish Farming) (Scotland) Amendment (No. 2) Order 2012 (S.S.I. 2012 No. 285)
- The Road Works (Maintenance) (Scotland) Amendment Regulations 2012 (S.S.I. 2012 No. 286)
- The Population (Statistics) Act 1938 Modifications (Scotland) Order 2012 (S.S.I. 2012 No. 287)
- The Crofting Reform (Scotland) Act 2010 (Commencement No. 3, Transitory, Transitional and Savings Provisions) Order 2012 (S.S.I. 2012 No. 288 (C. 31))
- The Adults with Incapacity (Public Guardian’s Fees) (Scotland) Amendment Regulations 2012 (S.S.I. 2012 No. 289)
- The Court of Session etc. Fees Amendment Order 2012 (S.S.I. 2012 No. 290)
- The High Court of Justiciary Fees Amendment Order 2012 (S.S.I. 2012 No. 291)
- The Justice of the Peace Court Fees (Scotland) Order 2012 (S.S.I. 2012 No. 292)
- The Sheriff Court Fees Amendment Order 2012 (S.S.I. 2012 No. 293)
- The Crofting Register (Scotland) Rules 2012 (S.S.I. 2012 No. 294)
- The Crofting Register (Fees) (Scotland) Order 2012 (S.S.I. 2012 No. 295)
- The Crofting Register (Notice of First Registration) (Scotland) Order 2012 (S.S.I. 2012 No. 296)
- The Crofting Register (Transfer of Ownership) (Scotland) Regulations 2012 (S.S.I. 2012 No. 297)
- The A85 Trunk Road (Oban) (Temporary Prohibitions) Order 2012 (S.S.I. 2012 No. 298)
- The A96 Trunk Road (Church Road, Keith) (Temporary Prohibition of Traffic) Order 2012 (S.S.I. 2012 No. 299)
- Act of Adjournal (Criminal Procedure Rules Amendment No. 3) (Procedural Hearings in Appeals from Solemn Proceedings) 2012 (S.S.I. 2012 No. 300)

== 301-400 ==
- The International Recovery of Maintenance (Hague Convention 2007) (Scotland) Regulations 2012 (S.S.I. 2012 No. 301)
- The Inverness Harbour Revision (Constitution) Order 2012 (S.S.I. 2012 No. 302)
- The Council Tax Reduction (Scotland) Regulations 2012 (S.S.I. 2012 No. 303)
- The Criminal Justice and Licensing (Scotland) Act 2010 (Incidental Provisions) Order 2012 (S.S.I. 2012 No. 304)
- The Criminal Legal Aid (Scotland) (Fees) Amendment (No. 2) Regulations 2012 (S.S.I. 2012 No. 305)
- The Housing (Scotland) Act 2001 (Assistance to Registered Social Landlords and Other Persons) (Grants) Amendment Revocation Regulations 2012 (S.S.I. 2012 No. 306)
- The Rural Development Contracts (Rural Priorities) (Scotland) Amendment Regulations 2012 (S.S.I. 2012 No. 307)
- The Diligence against Earnings (Variation) (Scotland) Regulations 2012 (S.S.I. 2012 No. 308)
- The South West Scotland Trunk Roads (Temporary Prohibitions of Traffic and Overtaking and Temporary Speed Restrictions) (No. 11) Order 2012 (S.S.I. 2012 No. 309)
- The South East Scotland Trunk Roads (Temporary Prohibitions of Traffic and Overtaking and Temporary Speed Restrictions) (No. 11) Order 2012 (S.S.I. 2012 No. 310)
- The North West Scotland Trunk Roads (Temporary Prohibitions of Traffic and Overtaking and Temporary Speed Restrictions) (No. 11) Order 2012 (S.S.I. 2012 No. 311)
- The North East Scotland Trunk Roads (Temporary Prohibitions of Traffic and Overtaking and Temporary Speed Restrictions) (No. 11) Order 2012 (S.S.I. 2012 No. 312)
- The Fife Area Trunk Roads (M9/A90/M90, A823(M) and A92) Temporary 40 mph Speed Restriction Order 2012 (S.S.I. 2012 No. 313)
- The Fife Area Trunk Roads (M9/A90/M90, A985, A823(M) and A92) Temporary Regulation and Prohibitions of Traffic and Pedestrians Order 2012 (S.S.I. 2012 No. 314)
- The Energy Performance of Buildings (Scotland) Amendment (No. 3) Regulations 2012 (S.S.I. 2012 No. 315)
- The Police Grant (Variation) (Scotland) Order 2012 (S.S.I. 2012 No. 316)
- The A77 Trunk Road (Dalrymple Street, Girvan) (Temporary Prohibition of Traffic) Order 2012 (S.S.I. 2012 No. 317)
- The Materials and Articles in Contact with Food (Scotland) Regulations 2012 (S.S.I. 2012 No. 318)
- The Council Tax Reduction (State Pension Credit) (Scotland) Regulations 2012 (S.S.I. 2012 No. 319)
- The M74 Motorway (Fullarton Road to the M8 West of Kingston Bridge) (Speed Limit) Regulations 2012 (S.S.I. 2012 No. 320)
- The Welfare of Animals at the Time of Killing (Scotland) Regulations 2012 (S.S.I. 2012 No. 321)
- The Court Fees (Miscellaneous Amendments) Scotland Order 2012 (S.S.I. 2012 No. 322)
- The Glasgow Commonwealth Games Act 2008 (Ticket Touting Offence) (Exceptions for Use of Internet etc.) (Scotland) Regulations 2012 (S.S.I. 2012 No. 323)
- The Civic Government (Scotland) Act 1982 (Metal Dealers’ Exemption Warrants) Order 2012 (S.S.I. 2012 No. 324)
- The Town and Country Planning (Miscellaneous Amendments) (Scotland) Regulations 2012 (S.S.I. 2012 No. 325)
- The Plant Health (Scotland) Amendment (No. 2) Order 2012 (S.S.I. 2012 No. 326)
- The Crofting Register (Scotland) Amendment Rules 2012 (S.S.I. 2012 No. 327)
- The Crofting Register (Fees) (Scotland) Amendment Order 2012 (S.S.I. 2012 No. 328)
- The Rent (Scotland) Act 1984 (Premiums) Regulations 2012 (S.S.I. 2012 No. 329)
- The Homelessness (Abolition of Priority Need Test) (Scotland) Order 2012 (S.S.I. 2012 No. 330)
- The Housing Support Services (Homelessness) (Scotland) Regulations 2012 (S.S.I. 2012 No. 331)
- The Fire (Scotland) Act 2005 (Relevant Premises) Regulations 2012 (S.S.I. 2012 No. 332)
- The Police and Fire Reform (Scotland) Act 2012 (Commencement No. 2, Transitory and Transitional Provisions and Appointed Day) Order 2012 (S.S.I. 2012 No. 333 (C. 32))
- The Children's Hearings (Scotland) Act 2011 (Child Protection Emergency Measures) Regulations 2012 (S.S.I. 2012 No. 334)
- The Children's Hearings (Scotland) Act 2011 (Rights of Audience of the Principal Reporter) Regulations 2012 (S.S.I. 2012 No. 335)
- The Children's Hearings (Scotland) Act 2011 (Safeguarders: Further Provision) Regulations 2012 (S.S.I. 2012 No. 336)
- The Children's Hearings (Scotland) Act 2011 (Appeals against Dismissal by SCRA) Regulations 2012 (S.S.I. 2012 No. 337)
- The Council Tax (Administration and Enforcement) (Scotland) Amendment Regulations 2012 (S.S.I. 2012 No. 338)
- The Council Tax (Exempt Dwellings) (Scotland) Amendment Order 2012 (S.S.I. 2012 No. 339)
- Act of Sederunt (Fees of Messengers-at-Arms) (Amendment) (No. 2) 2012 (S.S.I. 2012 No. 340)
- Act of Sederunt (Fees of Sheriff Officers) (Amendment) (No. 2) 2012 (S.S.I. 2012 No. 341)
- The Scottish Local Government Elections Amendment (No. 2) Order 2012 (S.S.I. 2012 No. 342)
- The M9/A90/M90 Trunk Road (Humbie Rail Bridge to M9 Junction 1a) (Variable Speed Limits and Actively Managed Hard Shoulder) Regulations 2012 (S.S.I. 2012 No. 343)
- The M9/A9 Trunk Road (Newbridge to Winchburgh) (Variable Speed Limits and Actively Managed Hard Shoulder) Regulations 2012 (S.S.I. 2012 No. 344)
- The Banchory and Crathes Light Railway Order 2012 (S.S.I. 2012 No. 345)
- The Budget (Scotland) Act 2012 Amendment Order 2012 (S.S.I. 2012 No. 346)
- The Local Government Pension Scheme (Miscellaneous Amendments) (Scotland) Regulations 2012 (S.S.I. 2012 No. 347)
- The Shetland Islands Regulated Fishery (Scotland) Order 2012 (S.S.I. 2012 No. 348)
- The Marketing of Bananas (Scotland) Regulations 2012 (S.S.I. 2012 No. 349)
- The Port of Cairnryan Harbour Revision Order 2012 (S.S.I. 2012 No. 350)
- The A702 Trunk Road (Biggar High Street) (Temporary Prohibition of Traffic) Order 2012 (S.S.I. 2012 No. 351)
- The Non-Domestic Rate (Scotland) (No. 2) Order 2012 (S.S.I. 2012 No. 352)
- The Non-Domestic Rates (Levying) (Scotland) (No. 3) Regulations 2012 (S.S.I. 2012 No. 353)
- The Police Act 1997 (Criminal Records) (Scotland) Amendment Regulations 2012 (S.S.I. 2012 No. 354)
- The Welfare of Animals at the Time of Killing (Scotland) Amendment Regulations 2012 (S.S.I. 2012 No. 355)
- The South West Scotland Trunk Roads (Temporary Prohibitions of Traffic and Overtaking and Temporary Speed Restrictions) (No. 12) Order 2012 (S.S.I. 2012 No. 356)
- The South East Scotland Trunk Roads (Temporary Prohibitions of Traffic and Overtaking and Temporary Speed Restrictions) (No. 12) Order 2012 (S.S.I. 2012 No. 357)
- The North West Scotland Trunk Roads (Temporary Prohibitions of Traffic and Overtaking and Temporary Speed Restrictions) (No. 12) Order 2012 (S.S.I. 2012 No. 358)
- The North East Scotland Trunk Roads (Temporary Prohibitions of Traffic and Overtaking and Temporary Speed Restrictions) (No. 12) Order 2012 (S.S.I. 2012 No. 359)
- The Pollution Prevention and Control (Scotland) Regulations 2012 (S.S.I. 2012 No. 360)
