= Villalba v Merrill Lynch & Co Inc =

2007 Employment Appeal Tribunal decision

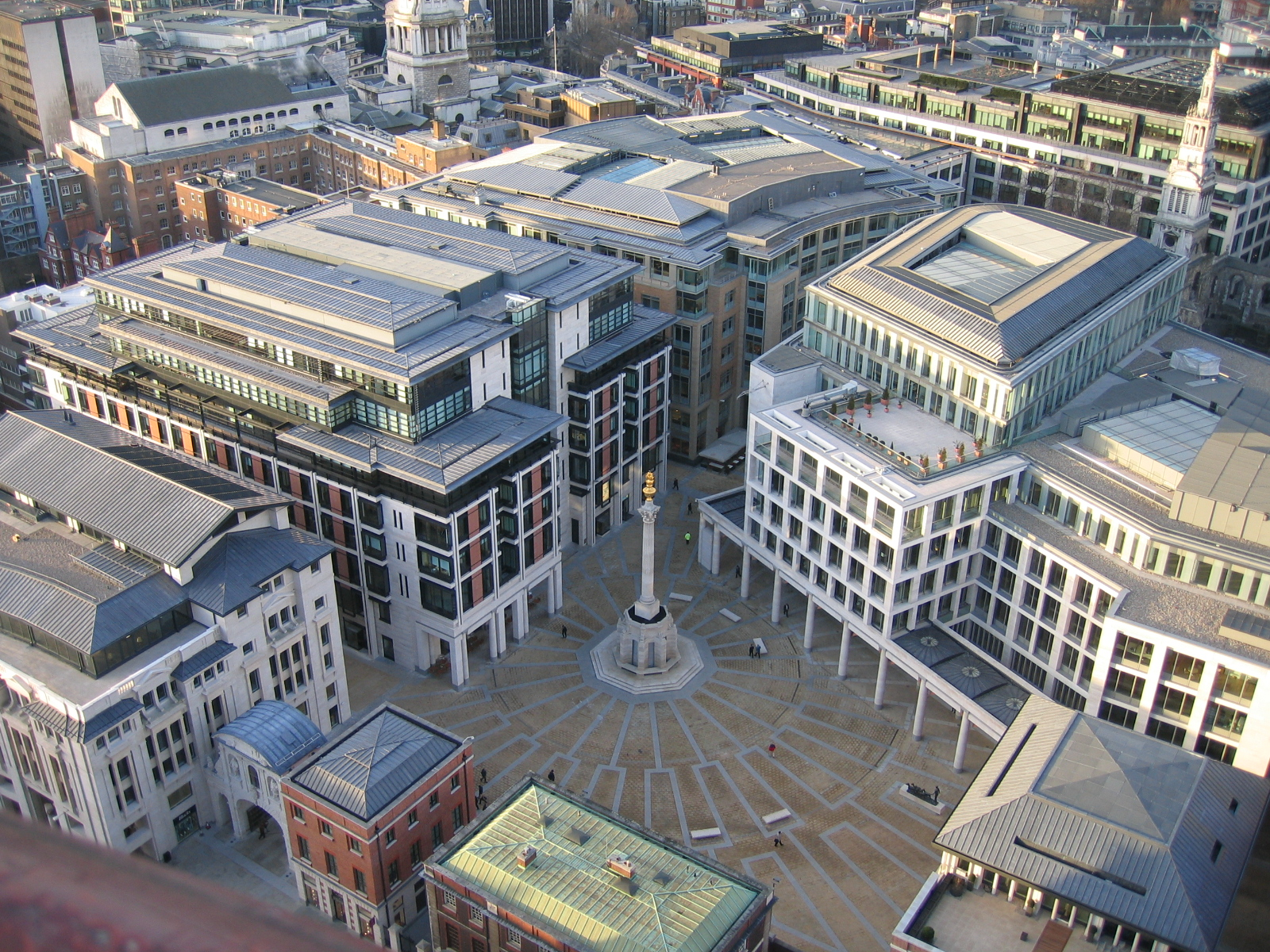
- Court: Employment Appeal Tribunal
- Decided: 31 March 2006
- Citation: [2007] ICR 469, [2006] UKEAT 0223_05_3103, [2006] IRLR 437
- Transcript: Full transcript from Balii

Villalba v Merrill Lynch & Co Inc [2007] ICR 469 is a UK labour law case, concerning sex discrimination and equal pay. It was the largest claim to be lodged in the United Kingdom, but was rejected in the Employment Tribunal and on appeal.

== Facts ==
Stephanie Villalba was the daughter of a former head of Merrill Lynch's France operations, and had many family members working with the company. She too joined as a graduate and by 2002 had become the "Market Executive for Europe". She reported to a Mr Raymundo Yu, who quickly formed the view that Ms Villalba was "not flexible" in taking criticism or advice on board. Late 2002 was a bad time in the markets, and Mr Yu appointed a Mr Ausuf Abbas, who took over some of Ms Villalba's functions. From then, followed some incidents, which the Tribunal found amounted to less than Ms Villalba had alleged. One was an email where Mr Abbas said Ms Villalba was "high maintenance". This was found simply to mean "requiring considerable management time and effort". A second was that on a jet flight between Frankfurt and Milan, Villalba got the last seat, near the drinks cabinet, and was expected to pour drinks for the fellow travellers. She alleged she was being made to feel like a flight attendant, but it was found that anybody who had sat there would have had to do the same.

Feeling isolated, Ms Villalba confided in the Human Resources head Ms Pauline Cahill and made according to the tribunal a "tentative allegation of sex discrimination", that she was not being treated as an equal team member. Ms Cahill (who had heard concerns about Ms Villalba's performance) encouraged Ms Villalba to work constructively, but then went and told others, and by 11 December Mr Abbas had heard that Ms Villalba had alleged sex discrimination. After that their relationship broke down and she complained further to Ms Cahill that Mr Abbas was "micro managing" her, while afterwards Mr Abbas said he tried to avoid her. In January bonuses were awarded, by Mr Yu, and Ms Villalba got the middle-ranking bonus for people who merely "achieved requirements". On 23 January Villalba and Abbas had a fight. Human resources did not do anything, except try to keep them apart. Mr Yu tried to find her a new job, but the one he came up with did not have the same pay or promotion prospects. On 21 Villalba sent a letter suggesting sex discrimination. Villalba rejected the new post, or any that would be outside the UK. On 28 March she was offered some leave while a new post was found, and she replied that she had instructed solicitors. After that she was told she must stay at home and her contract was terminated at the end of July.

Bonuses are 75%-80% of pay at Merrill Lynch, and the tribunal noted there is a culture of secrecy about these figures, but at the same time are perceived as a vital indicator of personal worth to the company. The Tribunal rejected the contention about sex discrimination, but did hold that Villalba's claims of victimisation were well founded, given Cahill's failure to keep Villalba's complaints confidential (see SDA 1975 ss 4(1) and 6(2)(b)).

== Judgment ==
Elias J rejected the appeal.

== See also ==
- UK labour law
- Employment discrimination law in the United Kingdom
