= Strathclyde RC v Wallace =

- Court: House of Lords
- Citation: [1998] 1 WLR 259

Case history
- Prior action: [1996] IRLR 670

Keywords
- Indirect discrimination, equal pay

Strathclyde Regional Council v Wallace [1998] 1 WLR 259 is a UK labour law case concerning indirect discrimination and equal pay.

== Facts ==
Teachers wanted equal pay as head teachers when they had to 'act up' or fill in for head teachers (even though they were not formally appointed). Most of the teachers who acted up were in fact men.

The Tribunal held the women did have a claim, even though none of the factors relied were discriminatory (acting up teachers also being men). The Employment Appeal Tribunal overruled, and the women claimants were unsuccessful on appeal.

== Judgment ==
The House of Lords refused the teachers' claim. Lord Browne-Wilkinson held that "the purpose of the section 1 of the Equal Pay Act is to eliminate sex discrimination in pay, not to achieve fair wages".

The selection by the applicants in this case of male principal teachers as comparators was purely the result of a tactical selection by these appellants: there are male and female principal teachers employed by the respondents without discrimination. Therefore the objective sought by the appellants is to achieve equal pay for like work regardless of sex, not to eliminate any inequalities due to sex discrimination. There is no such discrimination in the present case.

== See also ==
- UK labour law
- UK employment equality law
