= Sirdar v The Army Board =

- Court: European Court of Justice
- Full case name: Sirdar v The Army Board & Secretary of State for Defence
- Decided: 26 October 1999
- Citations: (1999) C-273/97, [1999] ECR I-7403

Keywords
- Discrimination

Sirdar v The Army Board (1999) C-273/97 is a UK labour law case concerning genuine occupational requirements for a job.

== Facts ==
Ms Sirdar was refused a position in the marines, and made redundant from position as chef. In the marines there had to be interoperability, so all marine members had to be capable of combat. There was a ban on combat for women.

== Judgment ==
The ECJ held Member States ‘depending on the circumstances, national authorities have a certain degree of discretion when adopting measures which they consider to be necessary in order to guarantee public security in a Member State’. Because marines were the ‘point of the arrow head’ the competent authorities were justified in having it be exclusively male.

== See also ==
- UK labour law
- UK employment equality law
