= Employment Equality (Religion or Belief) Regulations 2003 =

United Kingdom statutory instrument

Employment Equality (Religion or Belief) Regulations 2003 (Note: Section 1(1).)
- Statutory Instrument
- Parliament of the United Kingdom
- Citation: SI 2003/1660
- Territorial extent: England and Wales; Scotland; (Note: Section 1(2).)

Dates
- Made: 26 June 2003
- Commencement: 2 December 2003
- Revoked: 1 October 2010 (Note: The Equality Act 2010 (Commencement No. 4, Savings, Consequential, Transitional, Transitory and Incidental Provisions and Revocation) Order 2010 (SI 2010/2317).)
Other legislation
| Amends | Employment Tribunals Act 1996 |
| Made under | European Communities Act 1972 |
| Transposes | Directive 2000/78/EC |
| Revoked by | Equality Act 2010 |
| Relates to | Employment Equality (Sexual Orientation) Regulations 2003 |

Status: Revoked

Text of statute as originally enacted

Revised text of statute as amended

The Employment Equality (Religion or Belief) Regulations 2003 (SI 2003/1660) is a plank of United Kingdom labour law designed to combat discrimination in relation to people's religion or belief, or absence of religion or belief. They were introduced in order to comply with the European Union Directive 2000/78/EC and complement similar measures on sexuality, age, disability, race and gender discrimination. The EU Directive in turn is similar to legislation passed in the United States.

The Regulations have been revoked by, and the substantive provisions included in, the Equality Act 2010.

== Provisions ==
The main provisions of the regulations are to make direct and indirect discrimination against an employee or potential employee on the grounds of religion unlawful. They also make it unlawful to discriminate by way of victimization, or to harass an employee on grounds of religious belief. The regulations also extend to cover providers, and of vocational training about those undergoing training for any employment, and to those acting as employment agencies and giving careers advice.

There are exceptions for genuine occupational requirements, for national security, and for positive discrimination for overcoming disadvantages pertaining to adherents of a religious belief or to encourage religious adherents to take advantage of work opportunities.

A special clause protects Sikhs from requirements pertaining to the wearing of safety helmets.

== Case law ==
- McClintock v. Department of Constitutional Affairs
- Redfearn v. Serco
- Jivraj v Hashwani [2010] EWCA Civ 712
- McFarlane v Relate Avon Ltd [2010] EWCA Civ 880

== See also ==
- UK employment discrimination law
- UK labour law
- Human Rights Act 1998
