= R (Amicus) v Secretary of State for Trade and Industry =

2004 British labor law case

- Court: High Court of Justice
- Decided: 26 April 2004
- Citations: [2007] ICR 1176, [2004] ELR 311, [2004] EWHC 860 (Admin), [2004] IRLR 430, [2004] Pens LR 261

Court membership
- Judge sitting: Richards J

R. (on the application of Amicus) v Secretary of State for Trade and Industry [2004] EWHC 860 (Admin) is a UK labour law case, where a number of trade unions challenged the government's new implementation of EU Directive 2000/78/EC in the Employment Equality (Sexual Orientation) Regulations 2003.

== Facts ==
Various unions, including Amicus, challenged the government's implementation of sexuality discrimination law. In particular it was asked whether the exceptions created for churches and religious groups, being allowed to exclude gay people from employment was legitimate (r.7(3)).

== Judgment ==
Richards J held that the implementation was adequate, though it was stressed that the exceptions would be tightly construed. First, the genuine occupational requirements could apply where the employers were not satisfied an applicant met its requirements, as well as where they did not in fact. Second, it was rejected that a church group under r 7(3) could dismiss a gay cleaner, dismiss a science teacher for being a lesbian or not employ a gay person at a bookshop with holy scripts, even though people may have strong convictions. Nor could a Muslim group refuse a librarian post to someone appearing to be gay. It was "clear from the Parliamentary material that the exception was intended to be very narrow; and ... is on its proper construction, very narrow." That so, because it is a derogation from the equal treatment principle. Third, there is a difference between a religious organisation, such as a faith school where there can be no discrimination, and "for the purposes of an organised religion" where there can. Fourth, "so as to comply with the doctrines of the religion" would be an objective rather than a subjective test under r 7(3)(b)(ii).

== See also ==
- UK employment discrimination law
- UK labour law
