= McClintock v Dept of Constitutional Affairs =

McClintock v Department of Constitutional Affairs
- Court: Employment Appeal Tribunal
- Decided: 22 October 2007
- Citation: [2008] IRLR 29, [2007] UKEAT 0223_07_3110

McClintock v Department of Constitutional Affairs [2008] IRLR 29, Times 5 December 2007, is a UK employment discrimination law case concerning freedom of religion under Article 9 of the European Convention on Human Rights, unfair dismissal (s.94ff. Employment Rights Act 1996) and the new Employment Equality (Religion or Belief) Regulations 2003.

== Facts ==
McClintock was a magistrate who served for 15 years on the family panel. The law in the UK had recently been changed to prevent discrimination against same-sex couples. The change in the law meant that children needing foster homes could be placed with same-sex couples, and the sex of the parents would not be the sole justifiable reason for declining placement.

McClintock raised objections to sitting on cases where he might have to place children in foster homes with same-sex couples. At first he said that there was evidence to show that children placed with same-sex couples would be disadvantaged when compared to a child placed with a heterosexual family. McClintock cited increased bullying at school as an example. McClintock felt that by placing a child with a same-sex family, he would be neglecting his statutory obligation to do what is in the child's best interests.

He then said that it was due to his religious convictions as a Christian that he could not sit on such cases. He was told by his employer, the Department of Constitutional Affairs (now the Ministry of Justice), that he would not be able to get an exemption from his duties. He brought them to the employment tribunal, where he lost and then appealed. Mr McClintock was represented by Paul Diamond.

== Judgment ==
Elias J at the Employment Appeals Tribunal dismissed the case because McClintock's objection was essentially founded on a belief that children were being used as guinea pigs in a social experiment, rather than on his philosophical or religious beliefs. The fact that McClintock had said he might sit on the cases when evidence had been given to him that children in same-sex foster homes were just as good as heterosexual foster homes showed that the conviction was not one of such gravity to qualify as religious or philosophical under the 2003 Regulations. Accordingly, not only had there been no engagement of his Art.9 ECHR right to freedom of religion, his dismissal was entirely fair, for misconduct (s.98(2)(b) ERA 1996).

== See also ==
- UK employment discrimination law
- UK labour law
- Human Rights Act 1998
