= Porcelli v Strathclyde Regional Council =

UK legal case

Porcelli v Strathclyde Regional Council [1986] IRLR 134 is a UK labour law case concerning sex discrimination.

== Facts ==
Some male co-workers at Strathclyde Regional Council made sexually abusive comments to Ms Porcelli. Employers are under a duty of care for their employees, so the law deems them vicariously liable for the other employees. Ms Porcelli sued the council for sexual discrimination. The council argued that the comments were not about sex discrimination, and although they used certain sexually charged terms, it was just general abuse because they did not like her.

== Judgment ==
Lord Emmerslie held that even though the abuse was motivated by not liking her rather than being sexist, it was still different treatment on the grounds of sex (this was before a self-standing harassment provision). The sexual language was a "sexual sword" and, therefore, had to be included in the scope of the provisions combatting sex discrimination.

== See also ==
- Robichaud v. Canada (Treasury Board)
- UK employment discrimination law
- UK labour law
