= Chief Constable of West Yorkshire Police v Khan =

UK labour law case

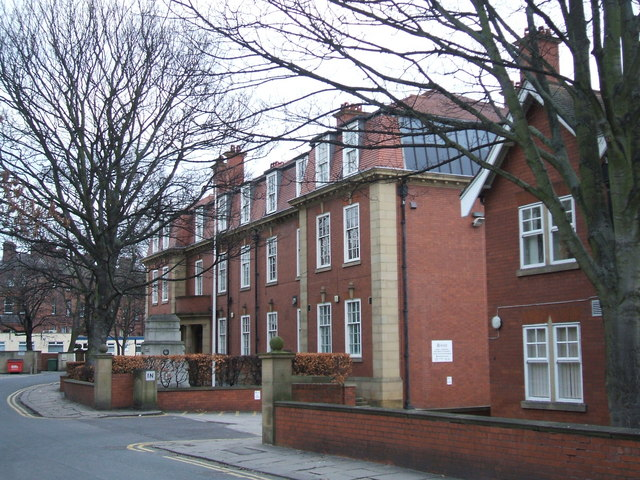
- West Yorkshire Police Headquarters.
- Court: House of Lords
- Decided: 11 October 2001
- Citation: [2001] UKHL 48, [2001] ICR 1065

Keywords
- Discrimination, victimisation

Chief Constable of West Yorkshire Police v Khan [2001] UKHL 48 is a UK labour law case concerning the test for victimisation and the legitimate steps an employer can take after dismissed a person who is bringing a discrimination claim against them.

== Facts ==
Sergeant Raham Noor Khan was not hired for another job, after he had left the first with a race discrimination claim pending. The reason for not hiring was apparently his communication and leadership skills. No reference was given by the force which was ‘unable to comment any further for fear of prejudicing his own case before the tribunal’. Recent staff appraisal records were refused as well.

The Employment Tribunal, EAT and Court of Appeal all upheld the victimisation claim, though the Tribunal dismissed the race discrimination claim.

== Judgment ==
The House of Lords overturned the victimisation claim, holding the police had a legitimate interest in withholding the reference from Mr Khan.

Lord Nicholls remarked that it was not a standard and sometimes ‘slippery’ causation analysis exercise here. ‘The phrases ‘on racial grounds’ and ‘by reason that’ denote a different exercise: why did the alleged discriminator act as he did? What, consciously or unconsciously, was his reason? Unlike causation, this is a subjective test. Causation is a legal conclusion. The reason why a person acted as he did is a question of fact... Employers, acting honestly and reasonably, ought to be able to take steps to preserve their position in pending discrimination proceedings without laying themselves open to a charge of victimisation. This accords with the spirit and purpose of the Act.’ So this was less favourable treatment, compared to someone who had not complained, but not ‘by reason that’ Khan had complained.

Lord Hoffmann, ‘They are not only employer and employee but also adversaries in litigation. The existence of that adversarial relationship may reasonably cause the employer to behave in a way which treats the employee less favourably than someone who had not commenced such proceedings.’

== See also ==
- UK labour law
- UK employment equality law
