= McFarlane v Relate Avon Ltd =

2010 UK court case

- Court: Court of Appeal of England and Wales
- Decided: 29 April 2010
- Citations: [2010] EWCA Civ 880; [2010] I.R.L.R. 872; 29 B.H.R.C. 249

Case history
- Related action: Ladele v Islington LBC [2009] ICR 387

Court membership
- Judge sitting: Laws LJ

Case opinions
- A relationship counsellor dismissed for refusing to counsel same sex couples on sexual matters because of his Christian beliefs did not suffer discrimination under the Employment Equality (Religion or Belief) Regulations 2003. Although the law protected a person's right to hold or express their religious beliefs, it did not protect the substance or content of those beliefs on the ground only that they were based on religious precepts.

McFarlane v Relate Avon Ltd [2010] EWCA Civ 880; [2010] IRLR 872; 29 BHRC 249 was an application in the Court of Appeal of England and Wales for permission to appeal against a decision of the Employment Appeal Tribunal, that a relationship counsellor dismissed for refusing to counsel same sex couples on sexual matters because of his Christian beliefs did not suffer discrimination under the Employment Equality (Religion or Belief) Regulations 2003. The application was heard by Lord Justice Laws, who issued his decision on 29 April 2010 refusing the application.

The case attracted significant media attention due to the issues involved, particularly the balance of religious and LGBT rights, the intervention of former archbishop of Canterbury George Carey, Lord Carey of Clifton, who provided a witness statement in support of the application, and the judge's strongly worded rebuttal of the applicant's submissions.

== Background ==
Gary McFarlane was a 48-year-old Christian from Bristol, employed as a relationship counsellor by the Avon branch of Relate, a charity providing relationship support including counselling for couples, families, young people and individuals, sex therapy, mediation and training courses. He joined the organisation in August 2003, and a condition of his employment was acceptance of the group's equal opportunities policy, which required him to ensure "that no person... [receive] less favourable treatment on the basis of characteristics, such as... sexual orientation...". Relate was also a member of the British Association for Sexual and Relationship Therapy, whose Code of Ethics required the therapist to "avoid discrimination... on grounds of... sexual orientation."

Although the applicant had found himself capable of assisting same-sex couples in counselling where discussion of sexual issues was not involved, in September 2006 he applied to undertake a diploma course in psycho-sexual therapy (PST) (a new name for sex therapy). Managers at Relate considered his raising of a possible conscionable objection to assisting same-sex couples with sexual issues to be incompatible with the organisation's equal opportunities policy and would reduce the number of couples he were able to help. On 12 December 2007, the applicant was asked to confirm in writing he would continue to counsel same-sex clients in both relationship counselling and PST with regard to all the sexual issues they may have brought, and that he would agree to carry out relationship work where it involved same-sex sexual issues.

In January 2008, McFarlane responded that he was unable to confirm this, and disciplinary proceedings were initiated. During these he confirmed that he would provide the required services to same-sex couples and the proceedings were ended. In March of that year however, he indicated to his supervisor that he might find it difficult to carry out such work, and on 18 March 2008, the applicant was dismissed from his post on the grounds:

That on 7 January 2008 you stated to Relate that you would comply with its Equal Opportunities policy and Professional Ethics policy in relation to work with same-sex couples and same-sex sexual activities, when you had and have no intention of complying with Relate's policies on those issues.

The applicant undertook an unsuccessful internal appeal against dismissal, and subsequently applied to the Employment Tribunal, claiming discrimination on the ground of religion or belief, harassment, unfair dismissal and wrongful dismissal. The claim of wrongful dismissal was accepted on procedural grounds, but the other claims were dismissed, and the applicant appealed against the dismissal of the claims of discrimination and unfair dismissal to the Employment Appeal Tribunal.

== Employment Appeal Tribunal ==
McFarlane's action before the Employment Appeal Tribunal was heard on 9–10 September 2009, and the judgement issued on 30 November. The Tribunal found that the applicant had suffered neither direct nor indirect discrimination under the Employment Equality (Religion or Belief) Regulations 2003 or the Human Rights Act 1998. The Tribunal made particular reference to remarks by Lord Bingham in the House of Lords decision in R (Begum) v Denbigh High School, that:

The Strasbourg institutions have not been at all ready to find an interference with the right to manifest religious belief in practice or observance where a person has voluntarily accepted an employment or role which does not accommodate that practice or observance and there are other means open to the person to observe his or her religion without undue hardship or inconvenience.

Reference was also made to Ladele v London Borough of Islington, a Christian registrar's unsuccessful appeal against dismissal for refusing to officiate civil partnership ceremonies.

== Court of Appeal ==
McFarlane applied to the Court of Appeal to be allowed to appeal the decision of the Employment Appeal Tribunal, however his application was refused by Lord Justice Elias on 30 January 2010. A renewed application was made before Lord Justice Laws on 15 April 2010. It contained a request that his case be heard before a specially constituted court comprising the Lord Chief Justice and five Lords Justices with proven sensibility towards religious issues. A witness statement was also submitted in support of the application by the former archbishop of Canterbury, George Carey, Lord Carey of Clifton. The statement supported Mr McFarlane's request for a specially constituted court, and also sought to refute suggestions that Christian teaching on same-sex unions was discriminatory and that such views were equivalent to homophobia. The application was refused in a judgement delivered on 29 April 2010.

Lord Justice Laws stated that:

the conferment of any legal protection or preference upon a particular substantive moral position on the ground only that it is espoused by the adherents of a particular faith, however long its tradition, however rich its culture, is deeply unprincipled.

As religious beliefs were by their nature impossible to prove, they were necessarily subjective, and could therefore only be considered to bind the behaviour of the believer and not that of anyone else. He went on to state:

The promulgation of law for the protection of a position held purely on religious grounds cannot therefore be justified. It is irrational, as preferring the subjective over the objective. But it is also divisive, capricious and arbitrary. We do not live in a society where all the people share uniform religious beliefs. The precepts of any one religion – any belief system – cannot, by force of their religious origins, sound any louder in the general law than the precepts of any other. If they did, those out in the cold would be less than citizens; and our constitution would be on the way to a theocracy, which is of necessity autocratic. The law of a theocracy is dictated without option to the people, not made by their judges and governments. The individual conscience is free to accept such dictated law; but the State, if its people are to be free, has the burdensome duty of thinking for itself.

The application was refused.

== Consequent events ==
Mr McFarlane appealed to the European Court of Human Rights on freedom of religion grounds. The court rejected his complaint in January, 2013.

== See also ==
- Christian Legal Centre
- Christianity and homosexuality
- LGBT rights in the United Kingdom
- Employment Equality (Religion or Belief) Regulations 2003
