= Free Representation Unit =

The Free Representation Unit is a charity, and is the largest single provider of pro bono representation in the United Kingdom. It was founded in 1972 by several law students at bar school, with the aim of relieving the impact of poverty by providing representation in tribunals to those who were unable to afford lawyers.

The charity operates from London providing representation in employment, social security and criminal injuries compensation tribunals. Other principal pro bono organisations in London include Advocate, Lawworks and Citizens Advice. All organisations are represented on the Attorney General for England and Wales's Pro Bono Committee.
