= John Laws (judge) =

English jurist (1945–2020)

The Right Honourable Sir John Laws
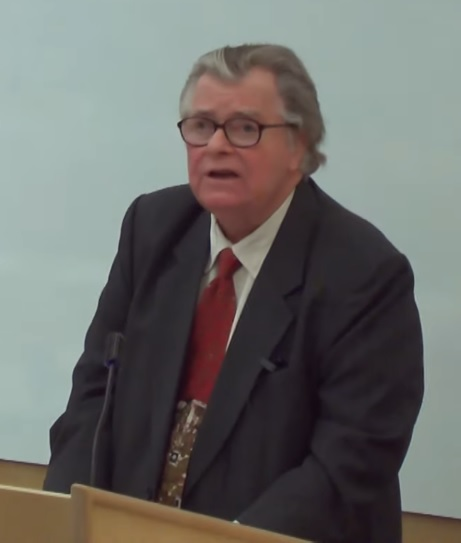

Lord Justice of Appeal
- In office 1999–2016

Justice of the High Court
- In office 1992–1998

Personal details
- Born: John Grant McKenzie Laws; 10 May 1945
- Died: 5 April 2020 (aged 74) Chelsea and Westminster Hospital, Chelsea, London, England
- Spouse: Sophie Marshall
- Education: Exeter College, Oxford
- Occupation: Judge
- Profession: Barrister

Sir John Grant McKenzie Laws (10 May 1945 – 5 April 2020) was a Lord Justice of Appeal. He served from 1999 to 2016. He was the Goodhart Visiting Professor of Legal Science at the University of Cambridge, and an Honorary Fellow of Robinson College, Cambridge.

== Early life ==
Laws was born on 10 May 1945, the son of Dr Frederic Laws and his wife Dr Margaret Ross, née McKenzie, the daughter of the Congregational minister and academic John Grant McKenzie. He was educated at Durham Chorister School, and as a King's Scholar at Durham School. He studied at Exeter College, Oxford as a Senior Open Classical Scholar, receiving a First Class BA in 1967, and an MA in 1976. He became an honorary fellow of the college in 2000.

== Legal career ==
He was called to the Bar at the Inner Temple in 1970, and appointed a Bencher in 1985. He was appointed First Junior Treasury Counsel (Common Law) in 1984, and a Recorder in 1985, holding both positions until his appointment to the High Court in 1992.

=== Judicial career ===
Laws was appointed a High Court Judge in 1992, serving in the Queen's Bench Division, and was knighted at this time. He served until 1998, and in 1999 was appointed to the Court of Appeal as a Lord Justice of Appeal and appointed to the Privy Council.

==== Notable decisions ====
Thoburn v Sunderland City Council 2002 – Perhaps Sir John's most famous decision, and extremely controversial in the public law sphere. In it he recognises principles in common law contrary to parliamentary sovereignty. The foundation of his decision was on four propositions:

1. All the specific rights and obligations which EU law creates are by the ECA incorporated into our domestic law and rank supreme: that is, anything in our substantive law inconsistent with any of these rights and obligations is abrogated or must be modified to avoid the inconsistency. This is true even where the inconsistent municipal provision is contained in primary legislation.
2. The ECA is a constitutional statute: that is, it cannot be impliedly repealed. A constitutional statute can, however, be explicitly repealed by a subsequent statute.
3. The truth of (2) is derived, not from EU law, but purely from the law of England: the common law recognises a category of constitutional statutes.
4. The fundamental legal basis of the United Kingdom's relationship with the EU rests with the domestic, not the European, legal powers. In the event, which no doubt would never happen in the real world, that a European measure was seen to be repugnant to a fundamental or constitutional right guaranteed by the law of England, a question would arise whether the general words of the ECA were sufficient to incorporate the measure and give it overriding effect in domestic law. But that is very far from this case.

R v Somerset County Council, ex parte Fewings – Sir John sat in the first instance hearing of this historic case, concerning the legality of a decision made to prohibit hunting on a small area of land which the council had acquired and was argued to maintain under s120(1)(b) Local Government Act 1972.

McFarlane v Relate Avon Ltd – Sir John attracted considerable press attention for stating "The promulgation of law for the protection of a position held purely on religious grounds [...] is irrational, as preferring the subjective over the objective. But it is also divisive, capricious and arbitrary." This was in response to a witness statement submitted by former Archbishop of Canterbury Lord Carey that Christians should be afforded special protections under equality legislation on the grounds of earnestly held religious belief.

== Constitutional theory ==
Sir John Laws is noted for his extrajudicial writings in the journal, Public Law. His most notable contribution, "Law and Democracy", asserts that the constitution would be undemocratic if it gave all the power under it to the elected government. Therefore, it is the constitution, and not Parliament, that should be sovereign in the British constitution. He posits that the constitution must create a "higher-order law" in which human rights and constitutional fundamentals in a democracy can be protected by the courts against the abuses of government. This position stems from a fundamental distrust of the political constitution in holding the executive to account. It is similar in form to Quintin Hogg, Lord Hailsham's claim that in Britain there is an "elective dictatorship". Sir John does not see this shift to the legal sphere as being anti-democratic because judges uphold apolitical values that no politician would contest and are above the arguments that take place in the political sphere between politicians of political parties.

These statements are certainly controversial and have been fiercely contested by academics such as John Griffith and Martin Loughlin, both professors at the London School of Economics. The essential arguments made by these authors are to the effect that the metaphysical principles that Sir John cites are highly contentious. A good example of this is Laws' love of freedom of expression. When is it right for racist or sexist comments to be illegal? Whilst for Griffith it should be up to a democratically elected legislature to decide such tricky moral issues, for Laws it is firmly a matter of law for the judges to decide. The problem with the latter approach, according to Griffith, stems from the fact that judges cannot be removed if the decisions they make are judged to be wrong by citizens of a polity. For Laws, on the other hand, such counter-majoritarianism is a beneficial aspect of the law, which acts to protect those that are vulnerable in society against the tyranny of the majority.

== Personal life ==
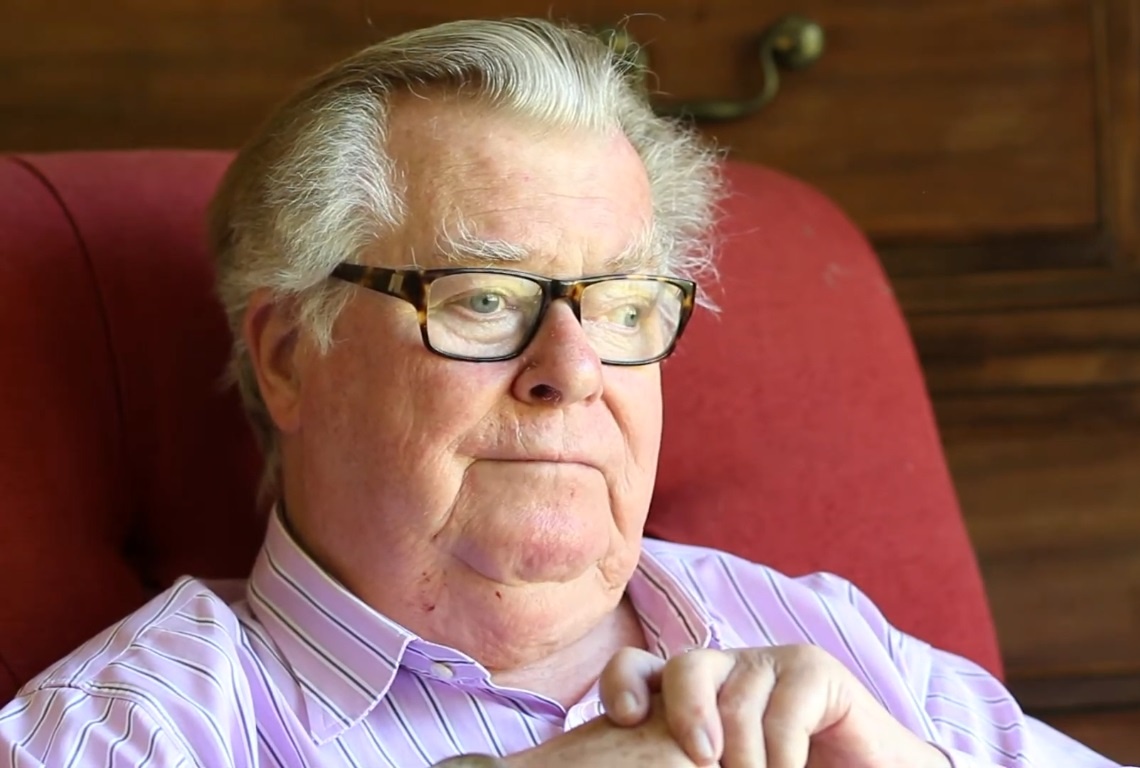
Laws in 2017

Sir John married Sophie Susan Sydenham Cole Marshall in 1973, with whom he had one daughter. Lady Laws died in 2017. He was a member of the Garrick Club. He was the maternal uncle of political adviser Dominic Cummings.

Sir John Laws was the Visitor at Cumberland Lodge since 2004.

On 5 April 2020, he died in Chelsea and Westminster Hospital, where he was originally being treated for sepsis and other conditions, due to health complications from COVID-19.

== Writings ==
- The Common Law Constitution (2014)
- The Constitutional Balance (2021)
