= Disability Standard =

The Disability Standard was a benchmarking assessment formerly run in the UK by Business Disability Forum.

Best described as a management tool for employers, the Disability Standard acted as a statistical study providing us with a snapshot of UK businesses performance on disability in line with the Disability Discrimination Act.

All participating organisations received a rank to demonstrate their commitment to disability confidence. Top scores achieved Platinum followed by Gold, Silver, Bronze and Participants ranks.

== History ==
The UK benchmark on Disability - later to become the Disability Standard - was first devised and piloted in 2004. Built by the Employers' Forum on Disability on the foundation of the 'Diversity Change Model', designed by Dr. Gillian Shapiro as a method for measuring an organisations performance on diversity strands, the benchmark assessment enabled an organisation to assess their organisations performance on disability in relation to the Disability Discrimination Act (DDA).

The original research and development group who took part in this pilot project consisted of:

Abbey, BT, BUPA, Barclays, Centrica, Cable & Wireless, HSBC, Royal Mail, PricewaterhouseCoopers and UnumProvident in the private sector and The Office of the Deputy Prime Minister, Metropolitan Police Service, Jobcentre Plus, Department for Education and Skills and the Department for Work and Pensions in the public sector.

Following the success of the initial trail the Disability Standard was officially launched in 2005 with help from secretary of state at the time, Alan Johnson, under the title of Employers' Forum Disability Standard 2005 with 80 UK organisations taking part including the House of Commons.

The benchmark survey ran again in 2007 with 116 participants and additions such as an interactive website enabling organisations to browse case studies and submit online. In 2009 - during the recession - 106 organisations participated taking the total number of organisations to have taken part in the Disability Standard since 2005 to over 200.

== Results ==
The findings from the Disability Standard form the base of the Benchmark Report that is published by the Employers' Forum on Disability after each assessment. Disability Standard Benchmark Reports were published in 2005, 2007, and 2009

=== Disability Standard 2009 ===
Over 100 organisations took part in the 2009 Disability Standard. For the first time since the inauguration of the benchmark the report included a top ten list of employers:

Position	Organisation
1.	British Library
2.	BT
3.	Motability Operations
4.	Barclays
5.	Disability East
6.	London Borough of Tower Hamlets
7.	Microlink
8.	Habinteg Housing Association
9.	Luton and Dunstable Hospital NHS Trust
10.	Ministry of Defence
