= Sex Discrimination (Election Candidates) Act 2002 =

Act of the Parliament of the United Kingdom

Sex Discrimination (Election Candidates) Act 2002 (Note: Section 4(1).)
- Act of Parliament
- Parliament of the United Kingdom
- Long title: An Act to exclude from the operation of the Sex Discrimination Act 1975 and the Sex Discrimination (Northern Ireland) Order 1976 certain matters relating to the selection of candidates by political parties.
- Citation: 2002 c. 2
- Introduced by: Stephen Byers, Secretary of State for Transport, Local Government and the Regions (Commons)
- Territorial extent: England and Wales (except section 2); Scotland (except section 2); Northern Ireland (except section 1); (Note: Section 4(2).)

Dates
- Royal assent: 26 February 2002
- Commencement: 26 February 2002 (Note: Section 4(b) of the Interpretation Act 1978.)
- Expired: 1 January 2016 (Note: Section 3.)
Other legislation
Amends	Sex Discrimination Act 1975; Sex Discrimination (Northern Ireland) Order 1976
Amended by	Equality Act 2010; Transfer of Functions (Equality) Order 2010
Relates to	Sex Discrimination Act 1975

Status: Amended

Text of statute as originally enacted

Revised text of statute as amended

The Sex Discrimination (Election Candidates) Act 2002 (c. 2) is an act of the Parliament of the United Kingdom. The purpose of the Act was to exempt the selection of candidates in parliamentary elections from the provisions in the Sex Discrimination Act 1975 and the Sex Discrimination (Northern Ireland) Order 1976 that outlaw sexual discrimination. The act allows political parties to select candidates based on gender to balance the gender representation in British politics.

The act applies to elections to:

- the House of Commons;
- the Scottish Parliament;
- the Senedd;
- the Northern Ireland Assembly;
- local government (including the London Assembly); and
- the European Parliament (until 2019).

The Act does not apply to selection of candidates for the Mayor of London elections. Only political parties registered under Part 2 of the Political Parties, Elections and Referendums Act 2000 are covered by the Act.

The Act was originally scheduled to run until the end of 2015. A statutory order to extend the deadline may be made if a draft has been laid before, and approved by resolution of, each House of Parliament. On 6 March 2008, Minister for Women Harriet Harman announced that the exemption would be extended until 2030 under the Equality Act 2010.

The Sex Discrimination Act 1975 did not specifically cover the selection of election candidates, and was not originally believed to do so. The Labour Party began to operate all-women shortlists before the 1997 general election. However, an employment tribunal case, Jepson v The Labour Party in 1996, held that section 13 of that act did cover the selection of candidates by political parties as it preventing men from entering a paid profession. It constrained parties taking positive action to increase, in that case, the number of women elected until this act was made law.
