= Employment Equality (Sexual Orientation) Regulations 2003 =

United Kingdom statutory instrument

Employment Equality (Sexual Orientation) Regulations 2003 (Note: Section 1(1).)
- Statutory Instrument
- Parliament of the United Kingdom
- Citation: SI 2003/1661
- Territorial extent: England and Wales; Scotland; (Note: Section 1(2).)

Dates
- Made: 26 June 2003
- Commencement: 1 December 2003
- Revoked: (Note: The Equality Act 2010 (Commencement No. 4, Savings, Consequential, Transitional, Transitory and Incidental Provisions and Revocation) Order 2010 (SI 2010/2317).)
Other legislation
Amends	Employment Tribunals Act 1996
Made under	European Communities Act 1972
Transposes	Equality Directive 2000 (2000/78/EC)
Revoked by	Equality Act 2010
Relates to	Employment Equality (Religion or Belief) Regulations 2003

Status: Revoked

Text of statute as originally enacted

Revised text of statute as amended

The Employment Equality (Sexual Orientation) Regulations 2003 (SI 2003/1661) were secondary legislation in the United Kingdom, which prohibited employers unreasonably discriminating against employees on grounds of sexual orientation, perceived sexual orientation, religion or belief and age.

These regulations have now been revoked and superseded by the Equality Act 2010.

== Outline ==
The regulations were brought into force under the terms of the European Communities Act 1972 as they were intended to implement within the United Kingdom the provisions of the EU Equal Treatment Directive covering discrimination on the grounds mentioned in the Amsterdam Treaty (disability, religion or belief, sexual orientation and age – with race and sex discrimination dealt with in other directives – see EU Anti-Discrimination Directive).

The regulations, as implemented in Great Britain and Northern Ireland covered the following areas:

- direct discrimination
- indirect discrimination
- victimisation
- harassment

They included employment, vocational training, professional organisations and trade unions. Cases were heard by an employment tribunal or at the County Court or a sheriff court.

The Sex Discrimination (Gender Reassignment) Regulations 1999 (SI 1999/1102) were introduced as an amendment to the Sex Discrimination Act 1975, allowing employment protection for people who had undergone or were proposing to undergo gender reassignment.

== Cases ==
Cleanaway was the first company ordered to pay compensation to a worker under the regulations, after a gay manager quit following persistent harassment from his seniors because of his sexuality.

The case received widespread media attention, with the victim commenting that prior to the case he had tried to keep his sexuality a private matter. The Guardian described it as a landmark judgment, while a Stonewall spokesperson said the ruling showed such abuse "was no longer going to be tolerated" and compared the remarks directed at the victim to "jokes about 'Pakis'" from previous decades.

As well as the regulations there has been a succession of case law defining the phrase 'on grounds of sexual orientation' in Regulation 5.

One example decided in 2008 by the Court of Appeal was English v Thomas Sanderson Blinds Ltd. Previously, protection had been extended so as to incorporate those perceived to be homosexual or bisexual, as well as through an association with homosexual or bisexual persons. However, the facts in English were that Mr. English was not gay, was not perceived to be gay by his tormentors, but was still treated as though he was. The tormentors in this case in fact knew that Mr. English was straight with children. The court found this was still sufficient connection to satisfy being 'on ground of sexual orientation' for Mr. English to be afforded protection under regulation 5 of the act.

== See also ==
- Employment discrimination law in the UK

== See also ==
- Employment Equality (Age) Regulations 2006
