= Weaver v National Association of Teachers in Further and Higher Education =

United Kingdom labour law case

Weaver v National Association of Teachers in Further and Higher Education [1988] ICR 599 EAT is a UK labour law case, concerning racial discrimination.

== Facts ==
The National Association of Teachers in Further and Higher Education refused to give advice or assistance to a woman lecturer who wanted to bring a claim for racial harassment against a fellow worker at Bournville College of Further Education because the worker could lose his job. It was then the policy of the Union not to support a case against a Union member if that member's job could be put at risk.

== Judgment ==
The Employment Tribunal upheld the trade union’s decision not to assist, on the grounds that the Union's policy was justifiable, even if the case involved allegations of race discrimination. The Employment Appeal Tribunal dismissed the appeal against that decision.

The case is cited in Harvey's Industrial Relations and Employment Law: "union justified in not assisting applicants discrimination claim since it would have jeopardised the job of a fellow member."

The Industrial Tribunal's judgement was that NATFHE could rely on the justification defence, which was that it had a legitimate duty (in light of its then policy) to protect the tenure of its members, to avoid conflicts in its representation of members and to avoid breaches of obligations to members whose tenure is at risk which outweighs the limited discriminatory effect of the condition imposed. As the Tribunal stated, "There is no evidence whatsoever that the union imposed the condition in race cases any differently than in cases of assault or theft or sexual harassment.”

Lord Triesman contributed to establishing the extant precedent.

The Employment Appeal Tribunal, chaired by Justice Popplewell, upheld the Industrial Tribunal decision, as did Lord Justice May in an application for the case to be heard before the Court of Appeal.
