= Equality Act 2010 =

British anti-discrimination law

Equality Act 2010 (Note: Section 218.)
- Act of Parliament
- Parliament of the United Kingdom
- Long title
Long title
An Act to make provision to require Ministers of the Crown and others when making strategic decisions about the exercise of their functions to have regard to the desirability of reducing socio-economic inequalities; to reform and harmonise equality law and restate the greater part of the enactments relating to discrimination and harassment related to certain personal characteristics; to enable certain employers to be required to publish information about the differences in pay between male and female employees; to prohibit victimisation in certain circumstances; to require the exercise of certain functions to be with regard to the need to eliminate discrimination and other prohibited conduct; to enable duties to be imposed in relation to the exercise of public procurement functions; to increase equality of opportunity; to amend the law relating to rights and responsibilities in family relationships; and for connected purposes.
- Citation: 2010 c. 15
- Introduced by: Harriet Harman (Commons); Baroness Royall of Blaisdon (Lords)
- Territorial extent: England and Wales; Scotland; Northern Ireland (sections 82, 105 (3) and (4) and 199); (Note: Section 217.)

Dates
- Royal assent: 8 April 2010
- Commencement: Various (Note: Section 216.)
Other legislation
Amends	Town Police Clauses Act 1847; Sex Discrimination (Election Candidates) Act 2002; Equality Act 2006; Employment Equality (Age) Regulations 2006
Repeals/revokes	Sex Disqualification (Removal) Act 1919; Equal Pay Act 1970; Sex Discrimination Act 1975; Race Relations Act 1976; Sex Discrimination Act 1986; Race Relations (Remedies) Act 1994; Disability Discrimination Act 1995; Employment Tribunals Act 1996; Employment Rights Act 1996
Amended by
Amendments: Budget Responsibility and National Audit Act 2011; Charities Act 2011; Education Act 2011; Localism Act 2011; Police Reform and Social Responsibility Act 2011; Public Bodies Act 2011; Financial Services Act 2012; Health and Social Care Act 2012; Legal Aid, Sentencing and Punishment of Offenders Act 2012; Crime and Courts Act 2013; Energy Act 2013; Enterprise and Regulatory Reform Act 2013; Financial Services (Banking Reform) Act 2013; Justice and Security Act 2013; Marriage (Same Sex Couples) Act 2013; Mobile Homes (Wales) Act 2013; Public Audit (Wales) Act 2013; School Standards and Organisation (Wales) Act 2013; Anti-Social Behaviour, Crime and Policing Act 2014; Bishops and Priests (Consecration and Ordination of Women) Measure 2014; Care Act 2014; Children and Families Act 2014; Local Audit and Accountability Act 2014; Criminal Justice and Courts Act 2015; Armed Forces (Service Complaints and Financial Assistance) Act 2015; Deregulation Act 2015; Qualifications Wales Act 2015; Cities and Local Government Devolution Act 2016; Scotland Act 2016; Bus Services Act 2017; Higher Education and Research Act 2017; National Citizen Service Act 2017; Policing and Crime Act 2017; Wales Act 2017; Additional Learning Needs and Education Tribunal (Wales) Act 2018; Gender Representation on Public Boards (Scotland) Act 2018; European Union (Withdrawal Agreement) Act 2020; Health and Social Care (Quality and Engagement) (Wales) Act 2020; Armed Forces Act 2021; Curriculum and Assessment (Wales) Act 2021; Environment Act 2021; Forensic Science Regulator Act 2021; Local Government and Elections (Wales) Act 2021; Medicines and Medical Devices Act 2021; Trade Act 2021; Advanced Research and Invention Agency Act 2022; Health and Care Act 2022; Nationality and Borders Act 2022; Taxis and Private Hire Vehicles (Disabled Persons) Act 2022; Finance (No. 2) Act 2023; Levelling-up and Regeneration Act 2023; Worker Protection (Amendment of Equality Act 2010) Act 2023; Media Act 2024; Victims and Prisoners Act 2024; Digital Markets, Competition and Consumers Act 2024; Employment Rights Act 2025

Status: Amended

History of passage through Parliament

Text of statute as originally enacted

Revised text of statute as amended

The Equality Act 2010 (c. 15), often erroneously called the Equalities Act 2010, is an act of the Parliament of the United Kingdom passed during the Brown ministry with the primary purpose of consolidating, updating and supplementing the numerous prior acts and regulations, that formed the basis of anti-discrimination law in mostly England, Scotland and Wales; some sections also apply to Northern Ireland. These consisted, primarily, of the Equal Pay Act 1970, the Sex Discrimination Act 1975, the Race Relations Act 1976, the Disability Discrimination Act 1995 and three major statutory instruments protecting against discrimination in employment on grounds of sexual orientation, age, and religion or belief. The act protects people against discrimination, harassment or victimisation in employment, and as users of private and public services based on these protected characteristics: age, disability, sex, sexual orientation, marriage and civil partnership, gender reassignment, pregnancy and maternity, race, and religion or belief.

The act has broadly the same goals as the four major EU Equal Treatment Directives, whose provisions it mirrors and implements. However, the act also offers protection beyond the EU directives, protecting against discrimination based on a person's nationality and citizenship and also extending individuals' rights in areas of life beyond the workplace in religion or belief, disability, age, sex, sexual orientation and gender reassignment.

The act includes provisions for single-sex services where the restrictions are "a proportionate means of achieving a legitimate aim". In the case of disability, employers and service providers are under a duty to make reasonable adjustments to their workplaces to overcome barriers experienced by disabled people. In this regard, the Equality Act 2010 did not change the law. Under s.217, with limited exceptions the act does not apply to Northern Ireland.

== Background ==
The Labour Party included a commitment to an Equality Bill in its 2005 election manifesto. The Discrimination Law Review was established in 2005 to develop the legislation and was led by the Government Equalities Office. The review considered the findings of the Equalities Review Panel, chaired by Trevor Phillips, which reported in February 2007. The act is intended to simplify the law by bringing together existing anti-discrimination legislation. The Equality Act 2010 has replaced the Equal Pay Act 1970, Sex Discrimination Act 1975, Race Relations Act 1976, Disability Discrimination Act 1995, Employment Equality (Religion or Belief) Regulations 2003, Employment Equality (Sexual Orientation) Regulations 2003 and the Employment Equality (Age) Regulations 2006.

Polly Toynbee wrote that the bill, which was drafted under the guidance of Harriet Harman, was "Labour's biggest idea for 11 years. A public-sector duty to close the gap between rich and poor will tackle the class divide in a way that no other policy has... This new duty to narrow the gap would permeate every aspect of government policy. Its possible ramifications are mind-bogglingly immense." One cabinet member described it as "socialism in one clause". This part of the legislation was never brought into force, except for Scottish devolved authorities. Sections 104–105 of the act extend until 2030 the exemption from sex discrimination law, which allows political parties to create all-women shortlists. The exemption was previously permitted by the Sex Discrimination (Election Candidates) Act 2002.

The parliamentary process was completed, following a debate, shortly after 11 pm on 6 April 2010, when amendments by the House of Lords were accepted in full.

== Debate ==
=== Reform of the monarchy ===
In April 2008, Solicitor General Vera Baird announced that as part of the Single Equality Bill, legislation would be introduced to repeal parts of the Act of Settlement 1701 that prevent Roman Catholics or those who marry Roman Catholics from ascending to the throne, and to change the inheritance of the monarchy from cognatic primogeniture to absolute primogeniture, so that the first-born heir would inherit the throne regardless of gender or religion.

However, later in 2008, the Attorney General Baroness Scotland of Asthal decided not to sponsor a change in the law of succession, saying, "To bring about changes to the law on succession would be a complex undertaking involving amendment or repeal of a number of items of related legislation, as well as requiring the consent of legislatures of member nations of the Commonwealth". The published draft bill did not contain any provisions to change the succession laws. Male-preference primogeniture for the British monarchy was instead abolished separately three years after the Equality Act came into force, with the enactment of the Succession to the Crown Act 2013.

=== Opposition by Roman Catholic bishops ===
Although the act was never going to change the law with regard to churches from its existing position, nor change the binding European Union law which covers many more Roman Catholics than those living in the United Kingdom, and although the position had been spelled out in the High Court in R (Amicus) v Secretary of State for Trade and Industry, a small number of Roman Catholic bishops in England and Wales made claims that they might in future be prosecuted under the Equality Act 2010 for refusing to allow women, married men, transgender people, and gay people into the priesthood. This claim was rejected by the government. A spokesman said an exemption in the law "covers ministers of religion such as Catholic priests" and a document released by the Government Equalities Office states that "the Equality Bill will not change the existing legal position regarding churches and employment". The legislation was also criticised by Anglican clergy.

== Exempt occupations ==
Certain employment is exempted from the act, including:

- Priests, monks, nuns, rabbis, and ministers of religion.
- Actors and models in the film, television and fashion industries (a British Chinese actress for a specific role, for instance).
- Special employment training programmes aimed at ethnic minorities, ex-offenders, young adults, the long-term unemployed, or people with physical or learning disabilities.
- Employment where there are cultural sensitivities (such as a documentary where male victims of domestic violence need to be interviewed by a male researcher, or a gay men's domestic violence helpline).
- Where safety or operational efficiency could be jeopardised.
- Political parties who use 'protected characteristics' (age, race, religion, sex, sexual orientation) as candidate selection criteria; however, these "Selection arrangements do not include short-listing only such persons as have a particular protected characteristic", other than sex, which may still be used to prejudice selection in some circumstances (e.g. All-women shortlists).
- Local support staff who work in embassies and high commissions, by virtue of diplomatic immunity.
- Where national security could be jeopardised.

== Contents ==
- Part 1 Socio-economic inequalities
  - The UK government has indicated its intention not to bring Part 1 into force with respect to UK public authorities.
  - However, the Scottish government has brought this section into force with respect to devolved Scottish authorities. It came into force for these authorities on 1 April 2018, with the legal requirements placed on these authorities by this part of the act being referred to by the Scottish government as the Fairer Scotland Duty.
  - The Welsh government also has the power to bring this section into force with respect to devolved Welsh authorities, but has not yet done so.
- Part 2 Equality: key concepts
  - Chapter 1 Protected characteristics
  - Chapter 2 Prohibited conduct
- Part 3 Services and public functions
- Part 4 Premises
- Part 5 Work
  - Chapter 1 Employment, etc.
  - Chapter 2 Occupational pension schemes
  - Chapter 3 Equality of terms
  - Chapter 4 Supplementary
- Part 6 Education
  - Chapter 1 Schools
  - Chapter 2 Further and higher education
  - Chapter 3 General qualifications bodies
  - Chapter 4 Miscellaneous
- Part 7 Associations
- Part 8 Prohibited conduct: ancillary
- Part 9 Enforcement
  - Chapter 1 Introductory
  - Chapter 2 Civil courts
  - Chapter 3 Employment tribunals
  - Chapter 4 Equality of terms
  - Chapter 5 Miscellaneous
- Part 10 Contracts, etc.
- Part 11 Advancement of equality
  - Chapter 1 Public sector equality duty
  - Chapter 2 Positive action
- Part 12 Disabled persons: transport
  - Chapter 1 Taxis etc.
  - Chapter 2 Public service vehicles
  - Chapter 3 Rail vehicles
  - Chapter 4 Supplementary
- Part 13 Disability: miscellaneous
- Part 14 General exceptions
- Part 15 General and miscellaneous

== Public sector equality duty ==
The duty set out in section 149 requires those public authorities which are subject to it to have due regard to three aims:

- to eliminate unlawful discrimination, harassment, victimisation and any other conduct prohibited under the act,
- to advance equality of opportunity between people who share a protected characteristic and those who do not, and
- to foster good relations between those who share a protected characteristic and those who do not.

The Cabinet Office's Information Note 1/13, "Public Procurement and the Public Sector Equality Duty", noted that public authorities needed to have due regard to this duty when planning and undertaking procurement activities, stating in particular that when contracting out public functions, it would be usual to include contract conditions which specified how equality obligations and objectives were to be complied with.

=== Equality Act 2010 (Specific Duties) Regulations ===
The Equality Act 2010 (Specific Duties) Regulations 2011 (SI 2011–2260), made on 9 September 2011, required public authorities to publish information to demonstrate their compliance with the public sector equality duty and to identify one or more objectives which they thought they should work to achieve.

== Legal challenges ==
=== Code of Practice on "Services, Public Functions and Associations" ===
In 2020, Authentic Equality Alliance CIC attempted to legally challenge the EHRC's Code of Practice on "Services, Public Functions and Associations", which attempts to provide practical guidance on implementing the Equality Act, concerning the advice that service providers should in general treat trans people as their acquired gender. The challenge failed to get a hearing before the High Court of Justice, because the justice did not consider the case to be arguable.

=== Meaning of "sex", "man", and "woman" ===
On 16 April 2025, the Supreme Court of the United Kingdom ruled in the case For Women Scotland Ltd v The Scottish Ministers that the act's definition of "woman" "man" and "sex" refers only to "biological sex", and that "woman" does not include trans women (even if they have a gender recognition certificate). The judges said: "Read fairly and in context, the provisions relating to single-sex services can only be interpreted by reference to biological sex." However, the judges said they were not ruling more broadly on the definition of "sex" or whether trans women are women in other contexts, saying "it was not the role of the court to adjudicate on the meaning of gender or sex". Lord Hodge also re-affirmed that the ruling does not affect the Equality Act 2010's protections from discrimination by the protected characteristic of gender reassignment, acknowledging that trans people were a vulnerable population that "struggle against discrimination and prejudice as they seek to live their lives with dignity". He warned that the judgment should not be seen as "a triumph of one or more groups in our society at the expense of another." The judges also insisted that despite their decision, trans people can still bring sex discrimination cases "not only against discrimination through the protected characteristic of gender reassignment, but also against direct discrimination, indirect discrimination and harassment in substance in their acquired gender". The judgement also does not change or invalidate the Gender Recognition Act 2004 or the process for obtaining a Gender Recognition Certificate.

==== First legal case to use FWS Judgement ====
In the first legal case to use the "FWS" judgement, Harriet Haynes, who had a gender recognition certificate and an updated birth certificate giving the sex of female, was excluded from the English Blackball Pool Federation's women's competition on the base of “biological sex” (under FWS, male), and was found not to have been discriminated against on the basis of gender reassignment (someone transitioning from female to male could be eligible).

== See also ==
- British employment equality law
- Equality impact assessment
- Gender Recognition Act 2004
- Mandla v Dowell-Lee

== Bibliography ==
- E. McGaughey, A Casebook on Labour Law (Hart 2019) chs 12–14
- S. Deakin and G. Morris, Labour Law (Hart 2012) ch 6
- Polly Toynbee, 'Harman's law is Labour's biggest idea for 11 years' (13 January 2009) The Guardian
