= Sex Discrimination Act 1975 =

Act of the Parliament of the United Kingdom

Sex Discrimination Act 1975 (Note: Section 87(1).)
- Act of Parliament
- Parliament of the United Kingdom
- Long title: An Act to render unlawful certain kinds of sex discrimination and discrimination on the ground of marriage, and establish a Commission with the function of working towards the elimination of such discrimination and promoting equality of opportunity between men and women generally; and for related purposes.
- Citation: 1975 c. 65
- Territorial extent: England and Wales; Scotland; Northern Ireland (paragraph 16 of schedule 3); (Note: Section 87(2).)

Dates
- Royal assent: 12 November 1975
- Commencement: 29th December 1975 (Note: Section 9(1).)
- Repealed: 1 October 2010 (except for the repeal of ss. 76A-76C and s. 81) (Note: The Equality Act 2010 (Commencement No. 4, Savings, Consequential, Transitional, Transitory and Incidental Provisions and Revocation) Order 2010.); 5 May 2011 (rest of act) (Note: The Equality Act 2010 (Commencement No. 6) Order 2011.)
Other legislation
Amends	Coal Mines Regulation Act 1908
Amended by	Education (Scotland) Act 1980; Armed Forces Act 1981; Industrial Training Act 1982; Sex Discrimination Act 1986; Trade Union Reform and Employment Rights Act 1993; Education Act 1996; Petroleum Act 1998; Sex Discrimination (Election Candidates) Act 2002
Repealed by	Equality Act 2010
Relates to	Race Relations Act 1976

Status: Repealed

Text of statute as originally enacted

Revised text of statute as amended

The Sex Discrimination Act 1975 (c. 65) was an act of the Parliament of the United Kingdom which protected men and women from discrimination on the grounds of sex or marital status. The act concerned employment, training, education, harassment, the provision of goods and services, and the disposal of premises.

The Sex Discrimination (Gender Reassignment) Regulations 1999, the Gender Recognition Act 2004 and the Sex Discrimination Act 1975 (Amendment) Regulations 2008 amended parts of this act to apply to those who "intend to undergo, are undergoing or have undergone gender reassignment".

Other amendments were introduced by the Sex Discrimination Act 1986, the Employment Act 1989, the Equality Act 2006, and other legislation such as rulings by the European Court of Justice.

The act did not apply in Northern Ireland, however the Sex Discrimination Gender Reassignment Regulations (Northern Ireland) 1999 does.

The act was repealed in full by the Equality Act 2010.

The act came into force on 29 December 1975.

== The Equal Opportunities Commission ==
The act established the Equal Opportunities Commission (EOC) whose main duties were to work towards the elimination of discrimination, to promote equality of opportunity between sexes and to keep under review the workings of the Sex Discrimination Act and the Equal Pay Act 1970. The EOC helped individuals bring cases to employment tribunals and to the courts. The EOC is now subsumed into the Equality and Human Rights Commission (EHRC). "Sex discrimination", as it is referred to in employment law, was introduced in the 1970s alongside equal pay legislation.

== Powers of the commission ==
The EHRC was empowered to do the following:

- Bring proceedings in respect of certain provisions and seek a court injunction to restrain the repetition of an unlawful act
- Commence a claim before an employment tribunal on behalf of an individual.
- Give practical guidance and advice to persons who appear to have a complaint under the Acts.

== Criticism ==
Conservative MP Ronald Bell criticised the legislation for doing more harm than good.

== See also ==
- Equality Act 2006
- Equality Act 2010
- Sex Discrimination Act 1984
