= O'Hanlon v Revenue and Customs Comrs =

UK labour law case

O'Hanlon v HMRC
- Court: Court of Appeal
- Decided: 30 March 2007
- Citations: [2007] EWCA Civ 283, [2007] ICR 1359

O'Hanlon v Revenue and Customs Commissioners [2007] EWCA Civ 283 is a UK labour law case concerning disability discrimination.

== Facts ==
Mrs O'Hanlon had clinical depression. She had absences from work at the Inland Revenue because of her disability, but also some from unrelated sicknesses. She was paid according to the employers' sick pay rules, that full salary would be given for a maximum of six months and then half pay for a further six months up to a maximum of one year in any four-year period. After that the pension rate of pay would be given. Mrs O'Hanlon argued these rules amounted to discrimination under the DDA 1995 s 3A(1) because the Revenue were failing to pay her fully for illness connected with her disability. Further, she argued that this was breaching the duty to make reasonable adjustments (s 4A). A reasonable adjustment, she suggested, would be full pay after the usual six-month period expired.

The tribunal held that she was not less favourably treated than others and in any case disparate treatment would have been justified since the cost of changing sick pay policy would have been excessive. Furthermore, although Ms O'Hanlon was at a disadvantage because of the sick pay rules, the employers had taken reasonable steps by reducing her hours and transferring her to an easier location (from Welwyn Garden City to Hertford) to commute from after her return. The Employment Appeal Tribunal dismissed her appeal. Mrs O'Hanlon appealed again.

== Judgment ==
The Court of Appeal (Ward, Sedley and Hooper LJJ) dismissed Mrs O'Hanlon's appeal and held in favour of the Revenue. It held that it would be invidious for an employer to have to determine whether to increase sick pay payments for everyone, or separate a disability related element out, merely because it created additional financial hardship for a disabled claimant. Resulting stress from lack of money during sick periods could equally be felt be a non-disabled person who was absent from work for a similar period. Once a tribunal had found that increasing sick pay was not a "reasonable adjustment" (s 4A) the test of justification was satisfied under s 3A(3).

Sedley LJ said the following.

The DDA in its amended form is not at all easy to follow. This is a particular misfortune in an Act which it ought to be possible for employees and managers to read, understand and implement without legal advice or litigation. It can at least be said with confidence that it creates three kinds of discrimination:

a. direct discrimination 'on the ground of' a person's disability, which is not open to justification: s 3A(5) and (4); b. disability-related discrimination, which is open to justification: s 3A(1) and (3); c. failure to make reasonable adjustments: ss 4A, 3A(2), 18B. In cases where there is no direct discrimination, it will often be useful to take issue (c) before issue (b). The present case is an example.

As to reasonable adjustments, the material provision here is the sick pay scheme. It is said to place Mrs O'Hanlon at a substantial disadvantage in comparison with employees who are not disabled because its effect is that paid sick leave attributable to her disability absorbs the paid sick leave she would otherwise be entitled to for occasional ailments. The employment tribunal accepted this argument and in my view were right to do so. The consequent question, as it has emerged in this court, is whether the employer had made "such adjustments as it [was] reasonable, in all the circumstances of the case, for him to have to make in order to prevent the provision … having that effect".

The reasons for the affirmative answer of both tribunals below necessarily dealt with the much more radical – and untenable – way the case had been principally put. But for reasons which they also touched upon, and which are clarified in the judgment of Hooper LJ, their answer was also correct in relation to Ms Williams' more moderate claim. Whether the relevant adjustment is regarded as the introduction of a discretion in the scheme to alleviate the disadvantage or as the exercise of such a discretion, both were present here, the former in the scheme, the latter in its operation insofar as its exercise was ever sought by Mrs O'Hanlon.

Was there then any disability-related discrimination? The critical question, and one which bedevils our equal opportunity legislation, is with whom the comparison is to be made. For reasons analysed and explained by Hooper LJ, in a case like the present it is an employee who is not disabled. Both have the benefit of the sick pay scheme, but one has the full cushioning of the scheme for occasional ailments or injuries while the other has to cope under the scheme with a (by definition) chronic disability as well as with occasional ailments and injuries. The guide dog example is illuminating less because it was used by a minister in debate than because if the answer were what Mr Jeans QC contends it is people would justifiably wonder what the point of the Disability Discrimination Act was.

While the test is not the same as for substantial disadvantage, it is unsurprising to find that what constitutes a substantial disadvantage also constitutes less favourable treatment. The more difficult question is whether the treatment is justified.

We are bound in this regard to follow the decision of this court in Post Office v Jones [2001] ICR 805, and I respectfully agree with Hooper LJ's application of it. But in case it one day comes up for reconsideration I reiterate the reservations about the decision which, with the concurrence of the other members of the court, I expressed in Collins v Royal National Theatre Board [2004] 2 All ER 851, §§14-16, 22-26. In particular I am troubled by the conclusion that justification is a matter for the employer, subject only to a Wednesbury-type test. The word in s 3A(1)(b) and (3) of the 1995 Act is "justified", not – as in the Sex Discrimination Act 1975 and the Race Relations Act 1976 – "justifiable". Yet even the word "justifiable", which is if anything more consonant with a subjective test, has been held to import an objective test in relation to both sex and race discrimination: see Bilka-Kaufhaus v Weber von Hartz [1986] ECR 1607, Rainey v Greater Glasgow Health Board [1987] AC 224, Hampson v Department of Education and Science [1991] 1 AC 171. There is also now a problem of proof by reason of s 17A(1C).

For the present, it seems to me that justification has been established by the respondent in Mrs O'Hanlon's case on an objective as well as a subjective basis. While collectively agreed pay structures for a very large establishment are not in principle beyond the reach of the 1995 Act, they are not ready candidates for individual variation. The whole point of a comprehensive pay scale and scheme is that it applies to everyone, so that individual departures are likely to create justified resentment and require the exercise of discretion in both the legal and non-legal sense of the word.

It is relevant that the aspect of the scheme with which we are concerned is not a term of a kind which every contract of employment has to contain. An employee who is absent for 6 months or more because of chronic illness, whether or not it amounts in law to a disability, might well find that at common law the contract has been frustrated by illness and that a consequent dismissal is held to be fair. A scheme which preserves the contractual relationship in such circumstances and assures first full pay and then half pay for extended periods of time therefore goes well beyond anything required by law. This is not of course to say that it is permissible, much less justified, to construct or administer such a scheme so that it operates arbitrarily to the disadvantage of the disabled. But any unplanned discriminatory impact may well be justified on the ground that such exceptions as can fairly be made in favour of disabled employees are already programmed into the scheme.

That, in my judgment, is this case. Both tribunals below were understandably concerned at the impact on staff relations of extending full pay indefinitely to those whose sick absence was caused by disability, which was the principal way the case was put to them. But the same concern, in kind if not in degree, arises from any enlargement of the entitlement to full pay and then to half pay based on the nature of the employee's illness. The respondent's scheme, even so, permits a measure of enlargement in individual cases, and that is all that Ms Williams, in her more discreet argument, contended for. It is not for us to say which cases these should be, and for the reasons explained by Hooper LJ Mrs O'Hanlon's was not necessarily one.

== See also ==
- Archibald v Fife Council [2004] ICR 954
- Post Office v Jones [2001] ICR 805
- Clark v Novocold Ltd [1999] ICR 951
