= Stephen Sedley =

British lawyer

The Right Honourable Sir Stephen Sedley
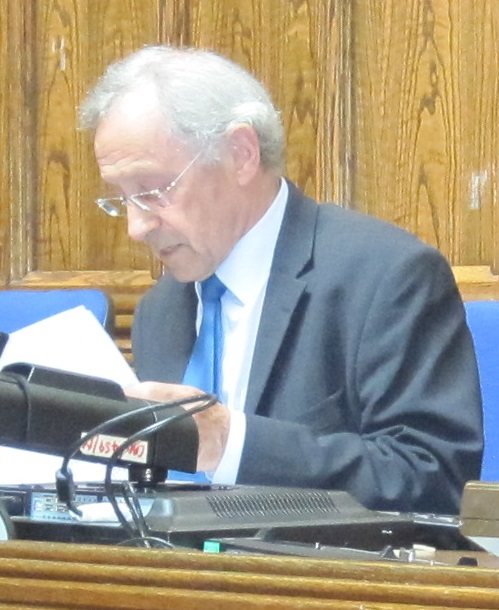
- Sedley in June 2010

Personal details
- Born: Stephen John Sedley; 9 October 1939 (age 87)
- Spouses: Ann Tate (m. 1968; div. 1995); Teresa Chaddock (m. 1996)
- Children: 3
- Parent(s): William and Rachel Sedley
- Education: Law
- Alma mater: Queens' College, Cambridge
- Occupation: Barrister, judge

Sir Stephen John Sedley (born 9 October 1939) is a British lawyer. He worked as a judge of the Court of Appeal of England and Wales from 1999 to 2011 and was a visiting professor at the University of Oxford from 2011 to 2015.

== Early life and education ==
Sedley was born to Rachel and William "Bill" Sedley. His father, who came from a Jewish immigrant family, operated a legal advice service in the East End of London in the 1930s. In the Second World War, Bill (1910–1985) served in North Africa and Italy with the Eighth Army. He founded the firm of lawyers of Seifert and Sedley in the 1960s with Sigmund Seifert, and was a lifelong Communist. Stephen himself joined the Communist Party of Great Britain in 1958, and left in the early 1980s. He was an unsuccessful Communist candidate for the Camden ward on Camden London Borough Council at the 1974 local elections. Sedley was described as a "former member" of the party by The Daily Telegraph in 2007. Sir Stephen's younger brother is Professor David Sedley.

Stephen Sedley attended Mill Hill School, followed by Queens' College, Cambridge, from which he graduated in 1961.

== Career ==
After graduation, Sedley worked as a musician and translator from 1961 to 1964. Sedley was called to the Bar (Inner Temple) in 1964 and practised in Cloisters chambers with John Platts-Mills, David Turner-Samuels and Michael Mansfield.

Sedley had a particular interest in the development of administrative law (the judicial review of governmental and administrative decision making). He was involved in cases which broadened the scope of judicial review and established the modern procedure for judicial review, and in ground-breaking cases in relation to employment rights, sex and race discrimination, prisoners' rights, coroners' inquests, immigration and asylum and freedom of speech. He was counsel in many high-profile cases and inquiries, from the death of Blair Peach and the Carl Bridgewater murder appeal to the Helen Smith inquest and the contempt hearing against Kenneth Baker, then Home Secretary.

In 1976, Sedley attended, as one of a group of observers, the "Luanda Trial", sometimes called "the Mercenaries' Trial", held by the then recently-victorious MPLA government in Luanda, Angola.

He became a QC in 1983. He was appointed a High Court judge in 1992, serving in the Queen's Bench Division. In 1999 he was appointed to the Court of Appeal as a Lord Justice of Appeal. He was a Judge ad hoc of the European Court of Human Rights and a Member ad hoc of the Judicial Committee of the Privy Council. His retirement from the Court of Appeal in 2011 coincided with the publication of a collection of his essays and lectures.

In September 2017, Sedley appeared at the launch of Jewish Voice for Labour, described by activist Jonathan Rosenhead as "a new organisation for Labour Party Jews who don't want to buy into the Jewish Labour Movement's pro-Zionist agenda". Sedley spoke on the subject of "Free Speech, Antisemitism and criticism of Israel".

== Notable judicial opinions ==
As a first instance judge, Sedley delivered important judgments in the field of administrative law, notably in relation to the concept of legitimate expectation as a ground for judicial review, and the duty to give reasons.

In the Court of Appeal he was one of the first English judges to recognise the right of privacy as an aspect of human autonomy and dignity, and was influential in developing the now well-established principle of proportionality (which he described as a "metwand" for balancing competing rights) in the fields of human rights and judicial review. His dissenting judgments in two appeals in 2008 concerning anti-terrorist measures were eventually to be vindicated on appeal to the House of Lords and in the first appeal to be heard by the Supreme Court in 2009. His judgment in the Chagos Islanders litigation developed the ambit of modern judicial review, and in a judgment in 2010 he developed his view that the basis for judicial review is to control abuse of power.

He also made a number of judgments in the field of immigration and asylum law. Always interested in freedom of speech his judgments also made important contributions to the modernisation of libel law. His formulation of the real significance of freedom of expression in a case involving the unlawful arrest of a street preacher has been much quoted: "Free speech includes not only the inoffensive but the irritating, the contentious, the eccentric, the heretical, the unwelcome and the provocative provided it does not tend to provoke violence. Freedom only to speak inoffensively is not worth having."

== Sedley's Laws of Documents ==
He formulated what has come to be known as "Sedley's Laws of Documents" after experiencing the tribulations of litigation:

1. Documents may be assembled in any order, provided it is not chronological, numerical or alphabetical.
2. Documents shall in no circumstances be paginated continuously.
3. No two copies of any bundle shall have the same pagination.
4. Every document shall carry at least 3 numbers in different places.
5. Any important documents shall be omitted.
6. At least 10 per cent of the documents shall appear more than once in the bundle.
7. As many photocopies as practicable shall be illegible, truncated or cropped.
8. Significant passages shall be marked with a highlighter which goes black when photocopied.
9. (a) At least 80 per cent of the documents shall be irrelevant. (b) Counsel shall refer in Court to no more than 5 per cent of the documents, but these may include as many irrelevant ones as counsel or solicitor deems appropriate.
10. Only one side of any double-sided document shall be reproduced.
11. Transcriptions of manuscript documents and translations of foreign documents shall bear as little relation as reasonably practicable to the original.
12. Documents shall be held together, in the absolute discretion of the solicitor assembling them, by: a steel pin sharp enough to injure the reader; a staple too short to penetrate the full thickness of the bundle; tape binding so stitched that the bundle cannot be fully opened; or a ring or arch-binder, so damaged that the arcs do not meet.

== Reception ==
Sedley has provoked considerable debate about the role of government in collecting and keeping DNA samples. At present criminal suspects detained by the police in the UK are automatically given cheek swabs and their DNA kept, in perpetuity, by the government. This has created the situation where different races are differently represented in the United Kingdom National DNA Database. On the grounds that this situation is indefensible, Lord Justice Sedley discussed the case for a blanket DNA collection policy, including collecting samples from all visitors to the UK.

Ian McEwan said of Ashes and Sparks: Essays on Law and Justice (Cambridge University Press, 2011) "you could have no interest in the law and read his book for pure intellectual delight, for the exquisite, finely balanced prose, the prickly humor, the knack of artful quotation and an astonishing historical grasp".

In February 2012, the London Review of Books published an essay by Sedley in which he criticised soon-to-be Supreme Court Justice Jonathan Sumption's FA Mann lecture. In this lecture, Sumption had argued that the judiciary had overstepped the boundary between its legitimate judicial function and illegitimate political decision making in the context of the remedy of judicial review. The critique centred on Sedley's conceptions of the precise interplay of the judicial, legislative, and executive branches, and made reference to the grey areas within which Parliament had not expressed any set opinion.

== Notable appointments and offices ==
- Member, International Commission on Mercenaries, 1976
- Visiting professorial Fellow, Warwick University, 1981
- President, National Reference Tribunals for the Coalmining Industry, 1983–88
- Osgoode Hall, visiting fellow 1985
- A director, Public Law Project, 1989–93
- Distinguished Visitor, Hong Kong University, 1992
- Chair, Bar Council sex discrimination committee, 1992–95
- Vice-President, Administrative Law bar Association, 1992–
- Hon. Fellow, Institute of Advanced Legal Studies, 1997–
- Laskin Visiting Professor, Osgoode Hall law school, Canada, 1997
- Visiting fellow, Victoria University, NZ, 1998
- President, British Institute of Human Rights, 2000–
- Chair, British Council Committee on Governance, 2002–05
- President, Constitutional Law Association, 2006–
- Visiting Professor, Faculty of Law, University of Oxford, 2012–
- Patron, Humanists UK
- Trustee, Rationalist Association, 2012–

== Honours ==
Sedley was knighted in 1992, and became a Privy Counsellor in 1999.

He has been made an Honorary Fellow by the Institute for Advanced Legal Studies (1997) and Mansfield College, Oxford (2012). Sedley was awarded an honorary doctorate by the University of North London in 1996. A number of universities have given him an honorary LLD (law degree): Nottingham Trent (1997); Bristol (1999); Warwick (1999); Durham (2001); Hull (2002); Southampton (2003); Exeter (2004); and Essex (2007).

== Personal life ==
In 1968, Sedley married Ann Tate. The couple had a son and two daughters; they were divorced in 1995. The following year, he married Teresa Chaddock. He lists his recreations in Who's Who as "carpentry, music, changing the world".

== Published works ==
- Law and the Whirligig of Time. Hart Publishing. 2018.
- Lions under the Throne: Essays on the History of English Public Law. Cambridge University Press. 2015.
- Ashes and Sparks: Essays on Law and Justice. Cambridge University Press. 2011.
- The Seeds of Love: A comprehensive anthology of folk songs of the British Isles compiled and edited by S. Sedley and published in association with the English Folk Dance & Song Society. Essex Music Ltd. 1967.
- A Spark in the Ashes: The Pamphlets of John Warr. Verso Books. 1992.
- The Making and Remaking of the British Constitution. London: Blackstone Press. 1997.
- Freedom, Law and Justice (50th series of Hamlyn lectures).

== Cases ==
Counsel

- Miles v Wakefield Metropolitan District Council [1987] UKHL 15, representing employee, lost
- Johnstone v Bloomsbury Health Authority [1992] QB 333, representing employee, won

Judicial opinions

- Ex parte Hamble (Offshore) Fisheries Ltd [1995] 2 All ER 714
- Redmond-Bate v Director of Public Prosecutions [1999] EWHC Admin 733
- In Plus Group Ltd v Pyke [2002] EWCA Civ 370
- Gwilliam v West Hertfordshire Hospital NHS [2002] EWCA Civ 1041, dissenting
- Collins v Royal National Theatre Board Ltd [2004] EWCA Civ 144, failure to make reasonable adjustments
- Dacas v Brook Street Bureau (UK) Ltd [2004] EWCA Civ 217, employee through agency had rights
- Allonby v Accrington & Rossendale College (2004) C-256/01, reference to CJEU
- Cream Holdings Ltd v Banerjee [2004] UKHL 44, dissenting in Court of Appeal, upheld by UKHL
- O'Hanlon v Revenue and Customs Commissioners [2007] EWCA Civ 283
- English v Sanderson Blinds Ltd [2008] EWCA Civ 1421, harassment
- BA (Nigeria) v Secretary of State [2009] 2 WLR 1370 (upheld by UKSC)
- Eweida v British Airways plc [2010] EWCA Civ 80, overturned by ECHR
- Buckland v Bournemouth University [2010] EWCA Civ 121, constructive dismissal of professor
- Autoclenz Ltd v Belcher [2011] UKSC 41, upheld by UKSC

Concurrences

- Bairstow v Queens Moat Houses plc [2001] EWCA Civ 712 (concurring)
- Bank of Credit and Commerce International (Overseas) Ltd v Akindele [2000] EWCA Civ 502, concurring
- Bailey v Ministry of Defence [2008] EWCA Civ 883 (concurring)

== See also ==
- UK labour law
