= Caroline Gooding =

- Born: 1959
- Died: 2014 (aged 54–55)
- Occupations: campaigner; lawyer

Caroline Gillian Gooding (7 March 1959 – 19 July 2014) was a British solicitor and activist for disabled people. She took up activism after having a stroke while in her early 20s. Gooding directed her efforts to publishing literature advocating a human rights-based approach to disability, advising, assisting and leading governmental disability commissions, and drafting government legislation to improve the status of disabled individuals, such as the Disability Discrimination Act 1995, the Disability Discrimination Act 2005 and the Equality Act 2010. The Caroline Gooding Memorial Lecture is named after the activist.

== Early life and education ==
Gooding was born in the Scottish city of Glasgow on 7 March 1959. She was the daughter of the general practitioner Keith Gooding and his wife Jessie (née Strange). At the age of two, Gooding and her family moved to London, and was educated at the St Paul's Girls' School. She graduated with a first in history and social and political science at the University of Cambridge in 1982 and trained to be a solicitor at the College of Law in London, qualifying in 1986. Gooding joined a firm in Newcastle soon after. From 1990 to 1991, she undertook a master of laws degree at the University of California, Berkeley, School of Law with her thesis on the effect of the Americans with Disabilities Act of 1990.

== Activism ==
A socialist, she took up activism for disability rights after having a stroke in her early 20s. Gooding worked for the Royal Association for Disability and Rehabilitation (now called Disability Rights UK). Gooding engaged with employers, unions and parliamentarians and all on the disability spectrum in an attempt to secure constitutional recognition and equal community rights. Her thesis at the University of California, Berkeley led to the publication of a book entitled Disabling Laws, Enabling Acts in 1994, which argued for a human rights-based approach to disability and introduced the disability discourse to a wider political platform. The following year, Gooding was instrumental in causing the passage of the Disability Discrimination Act 1995 (DDA) and published Blackstone’s Guide to the DDA in 1996.

She subsequently worked with the Government of the United Kingdom to produce the DDA's first statutory code of practice on employment provisions. It provided the legal system for standards to apply and earned her the reputation of "combining principle, realism and approachability to good effect." In 1997, Gooding co-established and directed the DDA Representation and Advice Project, which allocated cases to pro bono lawyers and provided disability law experts with an information exchange. She joined the Disability Rights Commission (DRC) as a special adviser in 2000. As it went into force, Gooding led the drafting of its statutory codes and campaigns to publicise the commission and encourage good practice.

At the same time, she joined Ken Livingstone's advisory cabinet as he was elected mayor of London. Gooding worked towards achieving better equality in the public sector of London, and she was also active in causes in feminism, lesbian and stances against racism. Gooding assisted lawyers in the formation of the Disability Discrimination Act Representation and Advice Project and was its first director. In 2005, she co-edited a publication on European disability rights and worked with the Academic Network of European Disability Experts. That year, Gooding was instrumental in drafting the Disability Discrimination Act 2005 and advocated public bodies to abide by a new obligation to promote equality within the disability spectrum. During this period, she continued to refer key legal cases to the DRC and disagreed with the Labour government's decision to disband it and subsume its functions into the Equality and Human Rights Commission.

Nevertheless, it led to the next stage of Gooding's career as she assisted the commission in drafting statutory codes and provided guidance in passing the Equality Act 2010. She was chairperson of the Trade Union Disability Alliance, was vice-chairman of the Discrimination Law Association, and was involved in the Business Disability Forum. In 2011, Gooding was employed part-time in the Department for Work and Pensions on issues concerning data protection. She died of breast cancer on 19 July 2014. At the time of her death, Gooding was co-editing a book on the effect of equality commissions around the world.

== Legacy ==
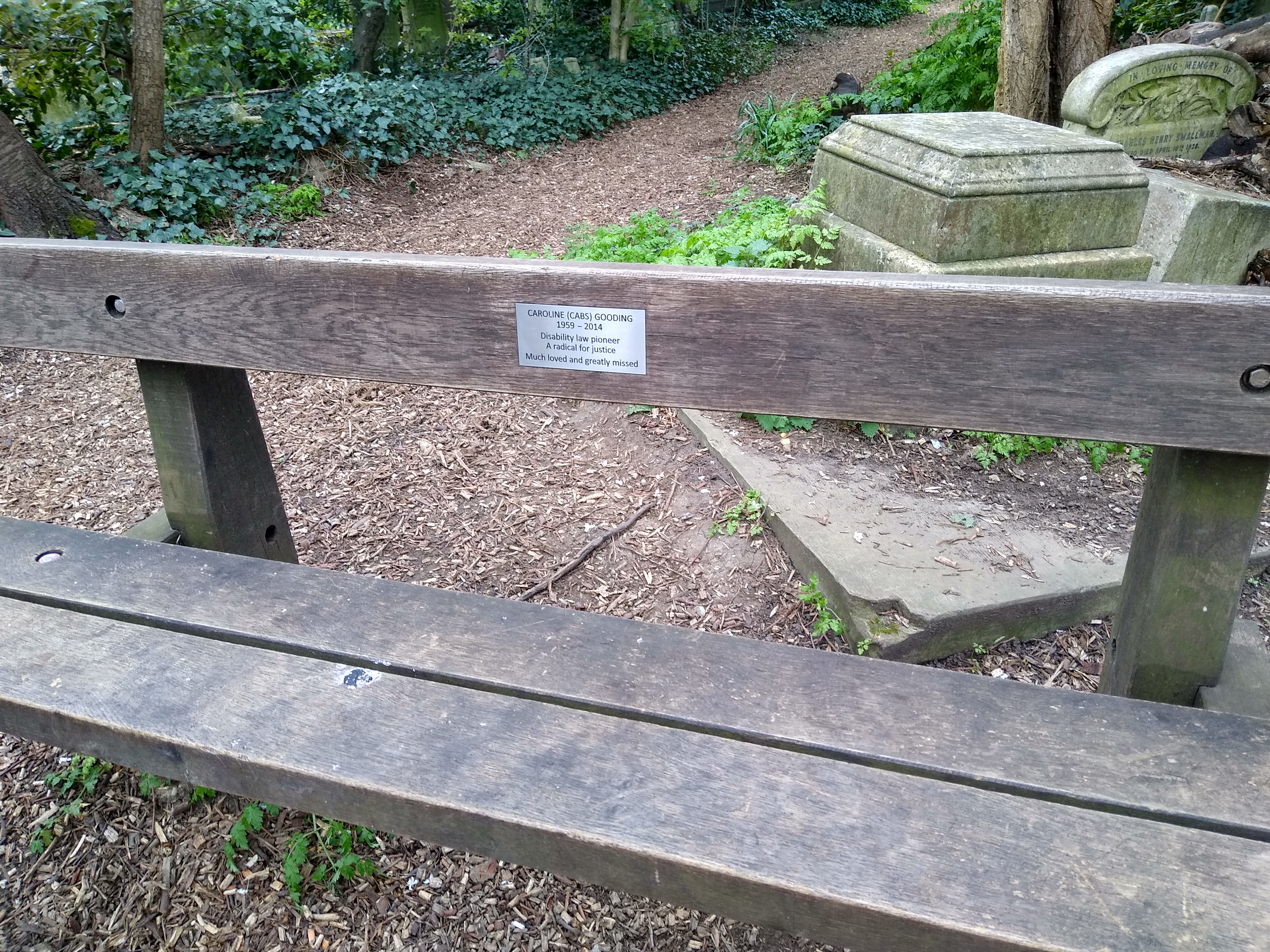
A bench honouring Gooding in Abney Park

The Caroline Gooding Memorial Lecture was set-up by the University of Leeds School of Law in 2018 as a memorial to the activist and the first was delivered by the jurist and professor Theresia Degener to demonstrate a new concept of equality being leveraged to implement the Convention on the Rights of Persons with Disabilities.
