= Eagle Place Services Ltd v Rudd =

British law case on disability discrimination

- Court: Employment Appeal Tribunal
- Decided: September 25, 2009; 15 years ago
- Citation: [2010] IRLR 486

Keywords
- Disability discrimination

Eagle Place Services Ltd v Rudd [2010] IRLR 486 (EAT) is a UK labour law case, concerning disability discrimination.

== Facts ==
Mr Rudd was a solicitor with detached retinas, and disabled within the meaning of the DDA 1995, working for law firm Nabarro as a senior associate, but employed by Eagle Place Services Ltd. Agreed adjustments to accommodate his disability were that some days he could work at home. This went well through a trial period. But eventually he was dismissed by the head of human resources, Ms Celia Staples, after he had allegedly asked for a raise to benefit from an insurance claim, threatened to sue for constructive dismissal otherwise and refused inspection of IT equipment at his house. The tribunal rejected Ms Celia Staples evidence as being unreliable, and found that on the contrary, the reason for dismissal was Nabarro was concerned about the cost of adjustments.

Nabarro appealed and contended the proper comparator was a lawyer of the same grade and skills who needed to work 2 days at home, and that such a person would not be dismissed. Running the “bastard defence”, Eagle Place Services acknowledged they acted unfairly but a hypothetical non-disabled comparator would have been treated no differently since, in large law firms, it was normal to manage dismissals by summarily dismissing highly paid employees, in the expectation that an amicable settlement would follow.

== Judgment ==
Judge Serota QC dismissed Nabarro’s appeal and held that having made adjustments, it could not assert that it would dismiss a non-disabled comparator whose adjustments would create the same cost. The hypothetical comparator would not have been dismissed, following Malcolm v Lewisham LBC. Moreover it would have been unreasonable to dismiss such a person, and so there was discrimination.

It is simply not open to the respondent to say that it has not discriminated against the claimant because it would have behaved unreasonably in dismissing the comparator. It is unreasonable to suppose that it in fact would have dismissed the comparator for what amounts to an irrational reason. It is one thing to find, as in Bahl, that a named individual has behaved unreasonably to both the claimant and named comparators; it is quite another to find that a corporate entity such as Nabarro or its service company would behave unreasonably to a hypothetical comparator when it had no good reason to do so.

Although unreasonable treatment in itself cannot give rise to an inference of discrimination, ‘where an employment tribunal has rejected an explanation on the part of the employer for what might be regarded as unreasonable behaviour it is perfectly proper for it to draw an inference of discrimination, assuming... there is other evidence pointing to discriminatory conduct.’

== See also ==
- UK labour law
