= List of statutory rules of Northern Ireland, 2003 =

This is an incomplete list of statutory rules of Northern Ireland in 2003.

== 1-100 ==
- Plastic Materials and Articles in Contact with Food (Amendment) Regulations (Northern Ireland) 2003 (S.R. 2003 No. 2)
- Companies (Northern Ireland) Order 1986 (Electronic Communications) Order (Northern Ireland) 2003 (S.R. 2003 No. 3)
- Companies (Principal Business Activities) (Amendment) Regulations (Northern Ireland) 2003 (S.R. 2003 No. 4)
- Foreign Companies (Execution of Documents) Regulations (Northern Ireland) 2003 (S.R. 2003 No. 5)
- General Medical Services (Amendment) Regulations (Northern Ireland) 2003 (S.R. 2003 No. 6)
- Anti-Pollution Works Regulations (Northern Ireland) 2003 (S.R. 2003 No. 7)
- Road Vehicles (Testing) (Disclosure of Information) Regulations (Northern Ireland) 2003 (S.R. 2003 No. 8)
- Animal By-Products (Identification) (Amendment) Regulations (Northern Ireland) 2003 (S.R. 2003 No. 9)
- Kava-kava in Food Regulations (Northern Ireland) 2003 (S.R. 2003 No. 10)
- Road Service Licensing (Amendment) Regulations (Northern Ireland) 2003 (S.R. 2003 No. 14)
- Gaming (Variation of Monetary Limits) Order (Northern Ireland) 2003 (S.R. 2003 No. 15)
- Intercountry Adoption (Hague Convention) Regulations (Northern Ireland) 2003 (S.R. 2003 No. 16)
- Magistrates' Courts (Detention and Forfeiture of Seized Cash) Rules (Northern Ireland) 2003 (S.R. 2003 No. 17)
- Social Security Commissioners (Procedure) (Tax Credits Appeals) Regulations (Northern Ireland) 2003 (S.R. 2003 No. 18)
- Road Vehicles Lighting (Amendment) Regulations (Northern Ireland) 2003 (S.R. 2003 No. 19)
- Livestock and Meat Commission (Maximum Levy) Regulations (Northern Ireland) 2003 (S.R. 2003 No. 20)
- Livestock and Meat Commission (Levy) Regulations (Northern Ireland) 2003 (S.R. 2003 No. 21)
- Disability Discrimination Act 1995 (Commencement No. 9) Order (Northern Ireland) 2003 (S.R. 2003 No. 24)
- State Pension Credit Regulations (Northern Ireland) 2003 (S.R. 2003 No. 28)
- State Pension Credit (2002 Act) (Commencement No. 2) Order (Northern Ireland) 2003 (S.R. 2003 No. 29)
- Valuation for Rating (Decapitalisation Rate) Regulations (Northern Ireland) 2003 (S.R. 2003 No. 30)
- Valuation for Rating (Plant and Machinery) Order (Northern Ireland) 2003 (S.R. 2003 No. 31)
- Magistrates' Courts (Sex Offender Orders) (Amendment) Rules (Northern Ireland) 2003 (S.R. 2003 No. 32)
- Control of Asbestos at Work Regulations (Northern Ireland) 2003 (S.R. 2003 No. 33)
- Control of Substances Hazardous to Health Regulations (Northern Ireland) 2003 (S.R. 2003 No. 34)
- Control of Lead at Work Regulations (Northern Ireland) 2003 (S.R. 2003 No. 35)
- Notification of New Substances (Amendment) Regulations (Northern Ireland) 2003 (S.R. 2003 No. 36)
- Public Service Vehicles Accessibility Regulations (Northern Ireland) 2003 (S.R. 2003 No. 37)
- Public Service Vehicles (Conditions of Fitness, Equipment and Use) (Amendment) Regulations (Northern Ireland) 2003 (S.R. 2003 No. 38)
- Motor Vehicles (Construction and Use) (Amendment) Regulations (Northern Ireland) 2003 (S.R. 2003 No. 39)
- Public Service Vehicles (Amendment) Regulations (Northern Ireland) 2003 (S.R. 2003 No. 40)
- Planning (Fees) (Amendment) Regulations (Northern Ireland) 2003 (S.R. 2003 No. 41)
- Seeds (Miscellaneous Amendments) Regulations (Northern Ireland) 2003 (S.R. 2003 No. 42)
- Legal Aid (Remuneration of Solicitors and Counsel in County Court Proceedings) (Amendment) Order (Northern Ireland) 2003 (S.R. 2003 No. 43)
- Social Security (Overlapping Benefits) (Amendment) Regulations (Northern Ireland) 2003 (S.R. 2003 No. 44)
- Social Security and Child Support (Decisions and Appeals) (Amendment) Regulations (Northern Ireland) 2003 (S.R. 2003 No. 45)
- Pollution Prevention and Control Regulations (Northern Ireland) 2003 (S.R. 2003 No. 46)
- Miscellaneous Charges (Amendments) Regulations (Northern Ireland) 2003 (S.R. 2003 No. 48)
- Environment (Northern Ireland) (2002 Order) (Commencement No. 1) Order (Northern Ireland) 2003 (S.R. 2003 No. 49)
- Health and Safety at Work Order (Application to Environmentally Hazardous Substances) Regulations (Northern Ireland) 2003 (S.R. 2003 No. 52)
- Child Support, Pensions and Social Security (2000 Act) (Commencement No. 9) Order (Northern Ireland) 2003 (S.R. 2003 No. 53)
- Rules of the Supreme Court (Northern Ireland) (Amendment) 2003 (S.R. 2003 No. 54)
- Blue Tongue Order (Northern Ireland) 2003 (S.R. 2003 No. 55)
- Child Support (Applications: Prescribed Date) Regulations (Northern Ireland) 2003 (S.R. 2003 No. 56)
- Social Security (Child Maintenance Premium and Miscellaneous Amendments) (Amendment) Regulations (Northern Ireland) 2003 (S.R. 2003 No. 57)
- Local Government (General Grant) Regulations (Northern Ireland) 2003 (S.R. 2003 No. 58)
- Sea Fishing (Restriction on Days at Sea) Order (Northern Ireland) 2003 (S.R. 2003 No. 59)
- Police Service of Northern Ireland and Police Service of Northern Ireland Reserve (Full-Time) (Severance) Regulations 2003 (S.R. 2003 No. 60)
- Local Government (Early Termination of Employment) (Discretionary Compensation) Regulations (Northern Ireland) 2003 (S.R. 2003 No. 61)
- Registered Rents (Increase) Order (Northern Ireland) 2003 (S.R. 2003 No. 62)
- Social Security (Industrial Injuries) (Prescribed Diseases) (Amendment) Regulations (Northern Ireland) 2003 (S.R. 2003 No. 63)
- Motor Vehicles (Driving Licences) (Amendment) Regulations (Northern Ireland) 2003 (S.R. 2003 No. 64)
- Motor Cars (Driving Instruction) (Amendment) Regulations (Northern Ireland) 2003 (S.R. 2003 No. 65)
- Police (Northern Ireland) Act 2000 (Commencement No. 5) Order 2003 (S.R. 2003 No. 66)
- Police Service of Northern Ireland (Conduct) Regulations 2003 (S.R. 2003 No. 68)
- Health and Personal Social Services (2001 Act) (Commencement No. 5) Order (Northern Ireland) 2003 (S.R. 2003 No. 69)
- Potatoes Originating in Egypt (Amendment) Regulations (Northern Ireland) 2003 (S.R. 2003 No. 70)
- Crown Court (Amendment) Rules (Northern Ireland) 2003 (S.R. 2003 No. 71)
- Valuation (Railways) Regulations (Northern Ireland) 2003 (S.R. 2003 No. 72)
- Revaluation (Consequential Provisions) Order (Northern Ireland) 2003 (S.R. 2003 No. 73)
- General Ophthalmic Services (Amendment) Regulations (Northern Ireland) 2003 (S.R. 2003 No. 74)
- Family Proceedings (Amendment) Rules (Northern Ireland) 2003 (S.R. 2003 No. 75)
- Railways (Rateable Value) Order (Northern Ireland) 2003 (S.R. 2003 No. 76)
- Valuation (Electricity) Order (Northern Ireland) 2003 (S.R. 2003 No. 77)
- Rates (Regional Rates) Order (Northern Ireland) 2003 (S.R. 2003 No. 78)
- Plant Protection Products (Amendment) Regulations (Northern Ireland) 2003 (S.R. 2003 No. 79)
- Housing Benefit (General) (Amendment) Regulations (Northern Ireland) 2003 (S.R. 2003 No. 80)
- Motor Vehicles (Driving Licences) (Designation of Relevant External Law) Order (Northern Ireland) 2003 (S.R. 2003 No. 83)
- Child Support and Social Security (Miscellaneous Amendments) Regulations (Northern Ireland) 2003 (S.R. 2003 No. 84)
- Social Security Pensions (Low Earnings Threshold) Order (Northern Ireland) 2003 (S.R. 2003 No. 85)
- Teachers' Superannuation (Additional Voluntary Contributions) (Amendment) Regulations (Northern Ireland) 2003 (S.R. 2003 No. 86)
- Infected Waters (Infectious Pancreatic Necrosis) Order (Northern Ireland) 2003 (S.R. 2003 No. 87)
- Legal Aid (Financial Conditions) Regulations (Northern Ireland) 2003 (S.R. 2003 No. 88)
- Legal Advice and Assistance (Financial Conditions) Regulations (Northern Ireland) 2003 (S.R. 2003 No. 89)
- Legal Advice and Assistance (Amendment) Regulations (Northern Ireland) 2003 (S.R. 2003 No. 90)
- Child Support and Social Security (Transitional Provision) (Miscellaneous Amendments) Regulations (Northern Ireland) 2003 (S.R. 2003 No. 91)
- Child Support, Pensions and Social Security (2000 Act) (Commencement No. 10) Order (Northern Ireland) 2003 (S.R. 2003 No. 92)
- Valuation (Telecommunications) Regulations (Northern Ireland) 2003 (S.R. 2003 No. 93)
- Legal Advice and Assistance (Amendment No. 2) Regulations (Northern Ireland) 2003 (S.R. 2003 No. 94)
- Radioactive Substances (Natural Gas) Exemption Order (Northern Ireland) 2003 (S.R. 2003 No. 95)
- Industrial Pollution Control (Prescribed Processes and Substances) (Amendment) Regulations (Northern Ireland) 2003 (S.R. 2003 No. 96)
- Environmental Protection (Controls on Ozone-Depleting Substances) Regulations (Northern Ireland) 2003 (S.R. 2003 No. 97)
- Planning (General Development) (Amendment) Order (Northern Ireland) 2003 (S.R. 2003 No. 98)
- Public Service Vehicles (Licence Fees) (Amendment) Regulations (Northern Ireland) 2003 (S.R. 2003 No. 99)
- Motor Vehicles (Driving Licences) (Amendment) (Test Fees) Regulations (Northern Ireland) 2003 (S.R. 2003 No. 100)

== 101-200 ==
- Motor Vehicle Testing (Amendment) (Fees) Regulations (Northern Ireland) 2003 (S.R. 2003 No. 101)
- Goods Vehicles (Testing) (Fees) (Amendment) Regulations (Northern Ireland) 2003 (S.R. 2003 No. 102)
- Administration of Insolvent Estates of Deceased Persons (Amendment) Order (Northern Ireland) 2003 (S.R. 2003 No. 103)
- Livestock and Meat Commission (Levy) (No. 2) Regulations (Northern Ireland) 2003 (S.R. 2003 No. 104)
- Marketing and Use of Dangerous Substances Regulations (Northern Ireland) 2003 (S.R. 2003 No. 105)
- Marketing and Use of Dangerous Substances (No. 2) Regulations (Northern Ireland) 2003 (S.R. 2003 No. 106)
- Social Security (Work-focused Interviews for Lone Parents Amendment) Regulations (Northern Ireland) 2003 (S.R. 2003 No. 107)
- Housing Benefit (General) (Amendment No. 2) Regulations (Northern Ireland) 2003 (S.R. 2003 No. 108)
- Disability Discrimination (Providers of Services) (Adjustment of Premises) Regulations (Northern Ireland) 2003 (S.R. 2003 No. 109)
- Further Education (Amendment of Governing Bodies' Powers) Order (Northern Ireland) 2003 (S.R. 2003 No. 110)
- M1/A1 (Sprucefield Interchange) Order (Northern Ireland) 2003 (S.R. 2003 No. 112)
- Environment (Northern Ireland) (2002 Order) (Commencement No. 2) Order (Northern Ireland) 2003 (S.R. 2003 No. 113)
- Foyle Area and Carlingford Area (Licensing of Fishing Engines) (Amendment) Regulations 2003 (S.R. 2003 No. 114)
- Zoos Licensing Regulations (Northern Ireland) 2003 (S.R. 2003 No. 115)
- Social Fund (Maternity and Funeral Expenses) (General) (Amendment) Regulations (Northern Ireland) 2003 (S.R. 2003 No. 117)
- Social Security (Claims and Payments) (Amendment) Regulations (Northern Ireland) 2003 (S.R. 2003 No. 118)
- Working Time (Amendment) Regulations (Northern Ireland) 2003 (S.R. 2003 No. 119)
- Strategic Investment and Regeneration of Sites (Designation) Order (Northern Ireland) 2003 (S.R. 2003 No. 120)
- Education (Student Support) (Amendment) Regulations (Northern Ireland) 2003 (S.R. 2003 No. 121)
- Magistrates' Courts (Proceeds of Crime Act 2002) (Confiscation) Rules (Northern Ireland) 2003 (S.R. 2003 No. 122)
- Pesticides (Maximum Residue Levels in Crops, Food and Feeding Stuffs) (Amendment) Regulations (Northern Ireland) 2003 (S.R. 2003 No. 123)
- Motor Vehicles (Approval) (Amendment) Regulations (Northern Ireland) 2003 (S.R. 2003 No. 124)
- Councillors (Travelling and Subsistence Allowances) (Amendment) Regulations (Northern Ireland) 2003 (S.R. 2003 No. 125)
- Valuation for Rating (Docks) Order (Northern Ireland) 2003 (S.R. 2003 No. 129)
- General Medical Services (Amendment No. 2) Regulations (Northern Ireland) 2003 (S.R. 2003 No. 133)
- Dental Charges (Amendment) Regulations (Northern Ireland) 2003 (S.R. 2003 No. 134)
- General Dental Services (Amendment) Regulations (Northern Ireland) 2003 (S.R. 2003 No. 135)
- Harbour Works (Environmental Impact Assessment) Regulations (Northern Ireland) 2003 (S.R. 2003 No. 136)
- Juvenile Justice Board (Transfer of Functions) Order (Northern Ireland) 2003 (S.R. 2003 No. 137)
- Social Care Tribunals Rules (Northern Ireland) 2003 (S.R. 2003 No. 138)
- Northern Ireland Social Care Council (Description of Social Care Workers) Order (Northern Ireland) 2003 (S.R. 2003 No. 139)
- Financial Investigations (Northern Ireland) Order 2001 (Commencement) Order 2003 (S.R. 2003 No. 140)
- Proceeds of Crime (Northern Ireland) Order 1996 (Code of Practice) (Commencement) Order 2003 (S.R. 2003 No. 141)
- Police (Northern Ireland) Act 1998 (Commencement No. 5) Order (Northern Ireland) 2003 (S.R. 2003 No. 142)
- Rates (Transitional Relief) Order (Northern Ireland) 2003 (S.R. 2003 No. 1434)
- Insolvent Partnerships (Amendment) Order (Northern Ireland) 2003 (S.R. 2003 No. 144)
- Motor Vehicles (Construction and Use) (Amendment No. 2) Regulations (Northern Ireland) 2003 (S.R. 2003 No. 145)
- Social Security Revaluation of Earnings Factors Order (Northern Ireland) 2003 (S.R. 2003 No. 146)
- Teachers' Superannuation (Amendment) Regulations (Northern Ireland) 2003 (S.R. 2003 No. 147)
- M1-M2 Link (Belfast) Order (Northern Ireland) 2003 (S.R. 2003 No. 149)
- Guaranteed Minimum Pensions Increase Order (Northern Ireland) 2003 (S.R. 2003 No. 150)
- Social Security (Credits) (Amendment) Regulations (Northern Ireland) 2003 (S.R. 2003 No. 151)
- Dangerous Substances and Explosive Atmospheres Regulations (Northern Ireland) 2003 (S.R. 2003 No. 152)
- Charges for Drugs and Appliances (Amendment) Regulations (Northern Ireland) 2003 (S.R. 2003 No. 153)
- Social Security (Miscellaneous Amendments) Regulations (Northern Ireland) 2003 (S.R. 2003 No. 154)
- Social Security Benefits Up-rating Order (Northern Ireland) 2003 (S.R. 2003 No. 155)
- Social Security Benefits Up-rating Regulations (Northern Ireland) 2003 (S.R. 2003 No. 156)
- Social Security (Industrial Injuries) (Dependency) (Permitted Earnings Limits) Order (Northern Ireland) 2003 (S.R. 2003 No. 157)
- Miscellaneous Food Additives (Amendment) Regulations (Northern Ireland) 2003 (S.R. 2003 No. 158)
- Food Labelling (Amendment) Regulations (Northern Ireland) 2003 (S.R. 2003 No. 159)
- Fish Labelling Regulations (Northern Ireland) 2003 (S.R. 2003 No. 160)
- Social Security (Earnings Factor) (Amendment) Regulations (Northern Ireland) 2003 (S.R. 2003 No. 161)
- Less Favoured Area Compensatory Allowances Regulations (Northern Ireland) 2003 (S.R. 2003 No. 162)
- Departments (Transfer of Functions) Order (Northern Ireland) 2003 (S.R. 2003 No. 163)
- Workmen's Compensation (Supplementation) (Amendment) Regulations (Northern Ireland) 2003 (S.R. 2003 No. 164)
- Marketing and Use of Dangerous Substances (No. 3) Regulations (Northern Ireland) 2003 (S.R. 2003 No. 165)
- Education (Student Loans) (Repayment) (Amendment) Regulations (Northern Ireland) 2003 (S.R. 2003 No. 166)
- Genetically Modified Organisms (Deliberate Release) Regulations (Northern Ireland) 2003 (S.R. 2003 No. 167)
- Social Security (Maternity Allowance) (Earnings) (Amendment) Regulations (Northern Ireland) 2003 (S.R. 2003 No. 168)
- Pensions Increase (Review) Order (Northern Ireland) 2003 (S.R. 2003 No. 169)
- Travelling Expenses and Remission of Charges (Amendment) Regulations (Northern Ireland) 2003 (S.R. 2003 No. 170)
- Housing Support Services (2002 Order) (Commencement) Order (Northern Ireland) 2003 (S.R. 2003 No. 171)
- Housing Support Services Regulations (Northern Ireland) 2003 (S.R. 2003 No. 172)
- Flexible Working (Procedural Requirements) Regulations (Northern Ireland) 2003 (S.R. 2003 No. 173)
- Flexible Working (Eligibility, Complaints and Remedies) Regulations (Northern Ireland) 2003 (S.R. 2003 No. 174)
- Plant Health (Wood and Bark) (Phytophthora ramorum) Order (Northern Ireland) 2003 (S.R. 2003 No. 175)
- Optical Charges and Payments and General Ophthalmic Services (Amendment) Regulations (Northern Ireland) 2003 (S.R. 2003 No. 176)
- Natural Mineral Water, Spring Water and Bottled Drinking Water (Amendment) Regulations (Northern Ireland) 2003 (S.R. 2003 No. 182)
- Motor Vehicles (Driving Licences) (Amendment No. 2) Regulations (Northern Ireland) 2003 (S.R. 2003 No. 183)
- Police Service of Northern Ireland (Amendment) Regulations 2003 (S.R. 2003 No. 184)
- Valuation (Natural Gas Undertaking) Regulations (Northern Ireland) 2003 (S.R. 2003 No. 185)
- Valuation (Water Undertaking) Regulations (Northern Ireland) 2003 (S.R. 2003 No. 186)
- Housing Benefit (General) (Amendment No. 4) Regulations (Northern Ireland) 2003 (S.R. 2003 No. 187)
- Planning (Amendment) (2003 Order) (Commencement No. 1) Order (Northern Ireland) 2003 (S.R. 2003 No. 188)
- Housing Benefit (General) (Amendment No. 3) Regulations (Northern Ireland) 2003 (S.R. 2003 No. 189)
- State Pension Credit (Consequential, Transitional and Miscellaneous Provisions) Regulations (Northern Ireland) 2003 (S.R. 2003 No. 191)
- Slaughter Premium (Amendment) Regulations (Northern Ireland) 2003 (S.R. 2003 No. 192)
- Plant Health (Phytophthora ramorum) Order (Northern Ireland) 2003 (S.R. 2003 No. 193)
- Surface Waters (Fishlife) (Classification) (Amendment) Regulations (Northern Ireland) 2003 (S.R. 2003 No. 194)
- Social Security (Working Tax Credit and Child Tax Credit Consequential Amendments) Regulations (Northern Ireland) 2003 (S.R. 2003 No. 195)
- Income-Related Benefits and Jobseeker's Allowance (Working Tax Credit and Child Tax Credit Amendment No. 2) Regulations (Northern Ireland) 2003 (S.R. 2003 No. 196)
- Housing Benefit (State Pension Credit) Regulations (Northern Ireland) 2003 (S.R. 2003 No. 197)
- Health and Social Services Trusts (Exercise of Functions) (Amendment) Regulations (Northern Ireland) 2003 (S.R. 2003 No. 200)

== 201-300 ==
- Carers and Direct Payments (2002 Act) (Commencement No. 1) Order (Northern Ireland) 2003 (S.R. 2003 No. 201)
- Welfare Foods (Amendment) Regulations (Northern Ireland) 2003 (S.R. 2003 No. 202)
- Energy (2003 Order) (Commencement No. 1) Order (Northern Ireland) 2003 (S.R. 2003 No. 203)
- Welfare Reform and Pensions (1999 Order) (Commencement No. 13) Order (Northern Ireland) 2003 (S.R. 2003 No. 204)
- General Medical Services (Amendment No. 3) Regulations (Northern Ireland) 2003 (S.R. 2003 No. 205)
- Genetically Modified Organisms (Deliberate Release) (Amendment) Regulations (Northern Ireland) 2003 (S.R. 2003 No. 206)
- Fire Services (Appointments and Promotion) (Amendment) Regulations (Northern Ireland) 2003 (S.R. 2003 No. 207)
- Radioactive Substances (Basic Safety Standards) Regulations (Northern Ireland) 2003 (S.R. 2003 No. 208)
- Environment (Designation of Relevant Directives) Order (Northern Ireland) 2003 (S.R. 2003 No. 209)
- Large Combustion Plants Regulations (Northern Ireland) 2003 (S.R. 2003 No. 210)
- State Pension Credit (2002 Act) (Commencement No. 3) Order (Northern Ireland) 2003 (S.R. 2003 No. 211)
- Tax Credits Act 2002 (Transitional Provisions and Savings) Order (Northern Ireland) 2003 (S.R. 2003 No. 212)
- Social Security (Working Tax Credit and Child Tax Credit Consequential Amendments No. 2) Regulations (Northern Ireland) 2003 (S.R. 2003 No. 213)
- Traffic Signs (Amendment) Regulations (Northern Ireland) 2003 (S.R. 2003 No. 214)
- Products of Animal Origin (Third Country Imports) (Amendment) Regulations (Northern Ireland) 2003 (S.R. 2003 No. 215)
- Road Transport (Qualifications of Operators) (Amendment) Regulations (Northern Ireland) 2003 (S.R. 2003 No. 217)
- Feeding Stuffs (Amendment) Regulations (Northern Ireland) 2003 (S.R. 2003 No. 219)
- Employment Rights (Northern Ireland) Order 1996 (Application of Article 112B to Adoptions from Overseas) Regulations (Northern Ireland) 2003 (S.R. 2003 No. 220)
- Social Security Contributions and Benefits (Northern Ireland) Act 1992 (Application of Parts XIIZA and XIIZB to Adoptions from Overseas) Regulations (Northern Ireland) 2003 (S.R. 2003 No. 221)
- Paternity and Adoption Leave (Adoption from Overseas) Regulations (Northern Ireland) 2003 (S.R. 2003 No. 222)
- Statutory Paternity Pay (Adoption) and Statutory Adoption Pay (Adoption from Overseas) Regulations (Northern Ireland) 2003 (S.R. 2003 No. 223)
- Social Security and Child Support (Miscellaneous Amendments) Regulations (Northern Ireland) 2003 (S.R. 2003 No. 224)
- Carers (Services) and Direct Payments Regulations (Northern Ireland) 2003 (S.R. 2003 No. 226)
- Lands Tribunal (Salaries) Order (Northern Ireland) 2003 (S.R. 2003 No. 227)
- Social Security (Incapacity Benefit) (Her Majesty's Forces) (Amendment) Regulations (Northern Ireland) 2003 (S.R. 2003 No. 231)
- Police (Northern Ireland) Act 2000 (Designated Places of Detention) Order 2003 (S.R. 2003 No. 232)
- Gaming (Bingo) Regulations (Northern Ireland) 2003 (S.R. 2003 No. 233)
- Housing Renovation etc. Grants (Reduction of Grant) (Amendment) Regulations (Northern Ireland) 2003 (S.R. 2003 No. 234)
- Plant Health (Amendment) Order (Northern Ireland) 2003 (S.R. 2003 No. 235)
- Street Works Register (Registration Fees) Regulations (Northern Ireland) 2003 (S.R. 2003 No. 236)
- Police (Northern Ireland) Act 2000 (Continuance of Office of Commissioner) Order 2003 (S.R. 2003 No. 237)
- Health and Personal Social Services (Quality, Improvement and Regulation) (2003 Order) (Commencement No. 1) Order (Northern Ireland) 2003 (S.R. 2003 No. 239)
- Air Quality (Ozone) Regulations (Northern Ireland) 2003 (S.R. 2003 No. 240)
- Employment Rights (Increase of Limits) Order (Northern Ireland) 2003 (S.R. 2003 No. 241)
- Infected Waters (Infectious Pancreatic Necrosis) Revocation Order (Northern Ireland) 2003 (S.R. 2003 No. 242)
- Infected Waters (Infectious Pancreatic Necrosis) (No. 2) Order (Northern Ireland) 2003 (S.R. 2003 No. 243)
- Welfare of Farmed Animals (Amendment) Regulations (Northern Ireland) 2003 (S.R. 2003 No. 244)
- Bangor (Harbour Area) Order (Northern Ireland) 2003 (S.R. 2003 No. 249)
- Groomsport (Harbour Area) Order (Northern Ireland) 2003 (S.R. 2003 No. 250)
- Ballycastle (Harbour Area) Order (Northern Ireland) 2003 (S.R. 2003 No. 251)
- Rathlin (Harbour Area) Order (Northern Ireland) 2003 (S.R. 2003 No. 252)
- Audit and Accountability (Northern Ireland) Order 2003 (Statutory Right of Access: Exclusions) Order (Northern Ireland) 2003 (S.R. 2003 No. 253)
- Decisions on Appeals and Making of Reports Rules (Northern Ireland) 2003 (S.R. 2003 No. 254)
- Registration of Foreign Adoptions Regulations (Northern Ireland) 2003 (S.R. 2003 No. 255)
- Social Security and Pensions (Financial Services and Markets Act 2000) (Consequential Amendments) Regulations (Northern Ireland) 2003 (S.R. 2003 No. 256)
- Sweeteners in Food (Amendment) Regulations (Northern Ireland) 2003 (S.R. 2003 No. 257)
- Protection of Water Against Agricultural Nitrate Pollution Regulations (Northern Ireland) 2003 (S.R. 2003 No. 259)
- Social Security (Hospital In-Patients and Miscellaneous Amendments) Regulations (Northern Ireland) 2003 (S.R. 2003 No. 261)
- Rules of the Supreme Court (Northern Ireland) (Amendment No. 2) 2003 (S.R. 2003 No. 263)
- Social Fund (Maternity and Funeral Expenses) (General) (Amendment No. 2) Regulations (Northern Ireland) 2003 (S.R. 2003 No. 264)
- Justice (Northern Ireland) Act 2002 (Commencement No. 3) Order 2003 (S.R. 2003 No. 265)
- Social Security (Removal of Residential Allowance and Miscellaneous Amendments) Regulations (Northern Ireland) 2003 (S.R. 2003 No. 267)
- Whole of Government Accounts (Designation of Bodies) (Northern Ireland) Order 2003 (S.R. 2003 No. 268)
- Housing (2003 Order) (Commencement No. 1) Order (Northern Ireland) 2003 (S.R. 2003 No. 270)
- Fisheries (Amendment) Byelaws (Northern Ireland) 2003 (S.R. 2003 No. 271)
- County Court (Amendment) Rules (Northern Ireland) 2003 (S.R. 2003 No. 272)
- Food Supplements Regulations (Northern Ireland) 2003 (S.R. 2003 No. 273)
- Social Security (Work-focused Interviews) Regulations (Northern Ireland) 2003 (S.R. 2003 No. 274)
- Motor Vehicles (Approval) (Amendment No. 2) (Revocation) Regulations (Northern Ireland) 2003 (S.R. 2003 No. 275)
- Statutory Paternity Pay (Adoption) and Statutory Adoption Pay (Adoptions from Overseas) (Administration) Regulations (Northern Ireland) 2003 (S.R. 2003 No. 276)
- Statutory Paternity Pay (Adoption) and Statutory Adoption Pay (Adoptions from Overseas) (Persons Abroad and Mariners) Regulations (Northern Ireland) 2003 (S.R. 2003 No. 277)
- Urban Waste Water Treatment (Amendment) Regulations (Northern Ireland) 2003 (S.R. 2003 No. 278)
- Crown Court (Amendment No. 2) Rules (Northern Ireland) 2003 (S.R. 2003 No. 279)
- Housing Renovation etc. Grants (Reduction of Grant) (Amendment No. 2) Regulations (Northern Ireland) 2003 (S.R. 2003 No. 282)
- Planning Applications (Exemptions from Publication) (Revocation) Order (Northern Ireland) 2003 (S.R. 2003 No. 283)
- Feeding Stuffs (Sampling and Analysis) and Feeding Stuffs (Enforcement) (Amendment) Regulations (Northern Ireland) 2003 (S.R. 2003 No. 287)
- Control of Substances Hazardous to Health (Amendment) Regulations (Northern Ireland) 2003 (S.R. 2003 No. 288)
- Prisoner Release Victim Information (Northern Ireland) Scheme 2003 (S.R. 2003 No. 293)
- Housing Benefit (State Pension Credit) (Abolition of Benefit Periods Amendment) Regulations (Northern Ireland) 2003 (S.R. 2003 No. 294)
- County Court (Amendment No. 2) Rules (Northern Ireland) 2003 (S.R. 2003 No. 295)
- Magistrates' Courts (Amendment) Rules (Northern Ireland) 2003 (S.R. 2003 No. 296)
- Education (Student Support) Regulations (Northern Ireland) 2003 (S.R. 2003 No. 298)
- Contaminants in Food Regulations (Northern Ireland) 2003 (S.R. 2003 No. 299)
- Condensed Milk and Dried Milk Regulations (Northern Ireland) 2003 (S.R. 2003 No. 300)

== 301-400 ==
- Specified Sugar Products Regulations (Northern Ireland) 2003 (S.R. 2003 No. 301)
- Motor Vehicle Testing Regulations (Northern Ireland) 2003 (S.R. 2003 No. 303)
- Goods Vehicles (Testing) Regulations (Northern Ireland) 2003 (S.R. 2003 No. 304)
- Fruit Juices and Fruit Nectars Regulations (Northern Ireland) 2003 (S.R. 2003 No. 305)
- Feeding Stuffs (Amendment No. 2) Regulations (Northern Ireland) 2003 (S.R. 2003 No. 306)
- Criminal Justice (2003 Order) (Commencement No. 1) Order (Northern Ireland) 2003 (S.R. 2003 No. 307)
- Social Fund (Maternity and Funeral Expenses) (General) (Amendment No. 3) Regulations (Northern Ireland) 2003 (S.R. 2003 No. 308)
- State Pension Credit (Decisions and Appeals - Amendments) Regulations (Northern Ireland) 2003 (S.R. 2003 No. 312)
- Cocoa and Chocolate Products Regulations (Northern Ireland) 2003 (S.R. 2003 No. 313)
- Misuse of Drugs (Amendment) Regulations (Northern Ireland) 2003 (S.R. 2003 No. 314)
- Pensions Appeal Tribunals (Northern Ireland) (Amendment) Rules 2003 (S.R. 2003 No. 316)
- Social Security (Claims and Payments and Miscellaneous Amendments) Regulations (Northern Ireland) 2003 (S.R. 2003 No. 317)
- Race Relations Order (Seamen Recruited Abroad) Order (Northern Ireland) 2003 (S.R. 2003 No. 318)
- Control of Pollution (Silage, Slurry and Agricultural Fuel Oil) Regulations (Northern Ireland) 2003 (S.R. 2003 No. 319)
- Health and Personal Social Services (Assessment of Resources) (Amendment) Regulations (Northern Ireland) 2003 (S.R. 2003 No. 320)
- Criminal Evidence (Northern Ireland) Order 1999 (Commencement No. 1) Order 2003 (S.R. 2003 No. 323)
- Misuse of Drugs (Amendment) (No. 2) Regulations (Northern Ireland) 2003 (S.R. 2003 No. 324)
- General Dental Services (Amendment No. 2) Regulations (Northern Ireland) 2003 (S.R. 2003 No. 325)
- Social Security (Students and Income-Related Benefits Amendment) Regulations (Northern Ireland) 2003 (S.R. 2003 No. 329)
- Working Time (Amendment No. 2) Regulations (Northern Ireland) 2003 (S.R. 2003 No. 330)
- Trade Union Elections and Ballots (Independent Scrutineer Qualifications) (Amendment) Order (Northern Ireland) 2003 (S.R. 2003 No. 331)
- Employment Relations (1999 Order) (Commencement No. 7) Order (Northern Ireland) 2003 (S.R. 2003 No. 332)
- Industrial Training Levy (Construction Industry) Order (Northern Ireland) 2003 (S.R. 2003 No. 336)
- Occupational Pension Schemes (Transfer Values and Miscellaneous Amendments) Regulations (Northern Ireland) 2003 (S.R. 2003 No. 337)
- Social Security (Working Tax Credit and Child Tax Credit Consequential Amendments No. 3) Regulations (Northern Ireland) 2003 (S.R. 2003 No. 338)
- Education (Student Support) (Amendment) Regulations (Northern Ireland) 2003 (S.R. 2003 No. 339)
- Education (Student Loans) (Amendment) Regulations (Northern Ireland) 2003 (S.R. 2003 No. 340)
- Race Relations Order (Amendment) Regulations (Northern Ireland) 2003 (S.R. 2003 No. 341)
- Air Quality Regulations (Northern Ireland) 2003 (S.R. 2003 No. 342)
- Smoke Control Areas (Exempted Fireplaces) (Amendment) Regulations (Northern Ireland) 2003 (S.R. 2003 No. 343)
- Access to Justice (Northern Ireland) Order 2003 (Commencement No. 1) Order (Northern Ireland) 2003 (S.R. 2003 No. 344)
- Company Directors Disqualification (2002 Order) (Commencement) Order (Northern Ireland) 2003 (S.R. 2003 No. 345)
- Company Directors Disqualification (2002 Order) (Transitional Provisions) Order (Northern Ireland) 2003 (S.R. 2003 No. 346)
- Companies (Disqualification Orders) Regulations (Northern Ireland) 2003 (S.R. 2003 No. 347)
- Health and Personal Social Services (Quality, Improvement and Regulation) (2003 Order) (Commencement No. 2) Order (Northern Ireland) 2003 (S.R. 2003 No. 348)
- Social Fund Winter Fuel Payment (Amendment) Regulations (Northern Ireland) 2003 (S.R. 2003 No. 349)
- Motor Hackney Carriages (Belfast) (Amendment) By-Laws (Northern Ireland) 2003 (S.R. 2003 No. 350)
- Social Security (Students and Income-Related Benefits Amendment No. 2) Regulations (Northern Ireland) 2003 (S.R. 2003 No. 351)
- Criminal Justice (2003 Order) (Commencement No. 2) Order (Northern Ireland) 2003 (S.R. 2003 No. 352)
- Food (Brazil Nuts) (Emergency Control) Regulations (Northern Ireland) 2003 (S.R. 2003 No. 353)
- Rehabilitation of Offenders (Exceptions) (Amendment) Order (Northern Ireland) 2003 (S.R. 2003 No. 355)
- Pharmaceutical Society of Northern Ireland (General) (Amendment) Regulations (Northern Ireland) 2003 (S.R. 2003 No. 356)
- Insolvent Companies (Reports on Conduct of Directors) Rules (Northern Ireland) 2003 (S.R. 2003 No. 357)
- Insolvent Companies (Disqualification of Unfit Directors) Proceedings Rules (Northern Ireland) 2003 (S.R. 2003 No. 358)
- Insolvent Partnerships (Amendment No. 2) Order (Northern Ireland) 2003 (S.R. 2003 No. 359)
- Food (Pistachios from Iran) (Emergency Control) Regulations (Northern Ireland) 2003 (S.R. 2003 No. 360)
- Food (Peanuts from China) (Emergency Control) (Amendment) Regulations (Northern Ireland) 2003 (S.R. 2003 No. 361)
- Food (Hot Chilli and Hot Chilli Products) (Emergency Control) Regulations (Northern Ireland) 2003 (S.R. 2003 No. 362)
- Food (Figs, Hazelnuts and Pistachios from Turkey) (Emergency Control No. 2) (Amendment) Regulations (Northern Ireland) 2003 (S.R. 2003 No. 363)
- Time Off for Public Duties Order (Northern Ireland) 2003 (S.R. 2003 No. 365)
- Fishing Vessel (Decommissioning) Scheme (Northern Ireland) 2003 (S.R. 2003 No. 366)
- Social Security (Back to Work Bonus and Lone Parent Run-on Amendment and Revocation) Regulations (Northern Ireland) 2003 (S.R. 2003 No. 367)
- Water Supply (Water Quality) (Amendment) Regulations (Northern Ireland) 2003 (S.R. 2003 No. 369)
- Education (Grants for Disabled Postgraduate Students) (Amendment) Regulations (Northern Ireland) 2003 (S.R. 2003 No. 370)
- Motor Vehicles (Driving Licences) (Amendment No. 3) Regulations (Northern Ireland) 2003 (S.R. 2003 No. 371)
- Police (Appointments) Regulations (Northern Ireland) 2003 (S.R. 2003 No. 372)
- State Pension Credit (2002 Act) (Commencement No. 4) and Appointed Day Order (Northern Ireland) 2003 (S.R. 2003 No. 373)
- Horse Racing (Charges on Bookmakers) Order (Northern Ireland) 2003 (S.R. 2003 No. 375)
- Police (Northern Ireland) Act 1998 (Modification) Order 2003 (S.R. 2003 No. 376)
- Food (Peanuts from Egypt) (Emergency Control) Regulations (Northern Ireland) 2003 (S.R. 2003 No. 377)
- Education (School Information and Prospectuses) Regulations (Northern Ireland) 2003 (S.R. 2003 No. 378)
- Pesticides (Maximum Residue Levels in Crops, Food and Feeding Stuffs) (Amendment) (No. 2) Regulations (Northern Ireland) 2003 (S.R. 2003 No. 379)
- Welfare of Animals (Scheduled Operations) (Amendment) Order (Northern Ireland) 2003 (S.R. 2003 No. 380)
- Time Off for Public Duties (No. 2) Order (Northern Ireland) 2003 (S.R. 2003 No. 381)
- Salaries (Assembly Ombudsman and Commissioner for Complaints) Order (Northern Ireland) 2003 (S.R. 2003 No. 382)
- Honey Regulations (Northern Ireland) 2003 (S.R. 2003 No. 383)
- Oil and Fibre Plant Seeds (Amendment) Regulations (Northern Ireland) 2003 (S.R. 2003 No. 384)
- Domestic Energy Efficiency Grants (Amendment) Regulations (Northern Ireland) 2003 (S.R. 2003 No. 385)
- Transportable Pressure Vessels Regulations (Northern Ireland) 2003 (S.R. 2003 No. 386)
- Housing Renovation etc. Grants (Reduction of Grant) (Amendment No. 3) Regulations (Northern Ireland) 2003 (S.R. 2003 No. 387)
- Social Security (Industrial Injuries) (Prescribed Diseases) (Amendment No. 2) Regulations (Northern Ireland) 2003 (S.R. 2003 No. 388)
- Social Fund Winter Fuel Payment (Amendment No. 2) Regulations (Northern Ireland) 2003 (S.R. 2003 No. 389)
- Waste Incineration Regulations (Northern Ireland) 2003 (S.R. 2003 No. 390)
- Welfare Foods (Amendment No. 2) Regulations (Northern Ireland) 2003 (S.R. 2003 No. 393)
- Pre-Sentence Report Disclosure (Prescription of Prosecutors) Order (Northern Ireland) 2003 (S.R. 2003 No. 394)
- Air Route Development (Northern Ireland) Limited (Funding) Order (Northern Ireland) 2003 (S.R. 2003 No. 395)
- Social Security (2002 Act) (Commencement No. 3) Order (Northern Ireland) 2003 (S.R. 2003 No. 396)
- Social Security (Attendance Allowance and Disability Living Allowance) (Amendment) Regulations (Northern Ireland) 2003 (S.R. 2003 No. 397)
- Social Security (Incapacity) (Miscellaneous Amendments) Regulations (Northern Ireland) 2003 (S.R. 2003 No. 398)
- Police Service of Northern Ireland (Appeals) (Amendment) Regulations 2003 (S.R. 2003 No. 399)
- Commissioner for Children and Young People (2003 Order) (Commencement) Order (Northern Ireland) 2003 (S.R. 2003 No. 400)

== 401-500 ==
- Diseases of Poultry (Amendment) Order (Northern Ireland) 2003 (S.R. 2003 No. 401)
- Allocation of Housing Regulations (Northern Ireland) 2003 (S.R. 2003 No. 402)
- Homelessness Regulations (Northern Ireland) 2003 (S.R. 2003 No. 403)
- Controlled Waste (Amendment) Regulations (Northern Ireland) 2003 (S.R. 2003 No. 404)
- Social Security (Work-focused Interviews for Partners) Regulations (Northern Ireland) 2003 (S.R. 2003 No. 405)
- Food (Star Anise from Third Countries) (Emergency Control) (Revocation) Order (Northern Ireland) 2003 (S.R. 2003 No. 406)
- Travelling Expenses and Remission of Charges (Amendment No. 2) Regulations (Northern Ireland) 2003 (S.R. 2003 No. 408)
- Injunctions Against Anti-Social Behaviour (Prescribed Premises) Regulations (Northern Ireland) 2003 (S.R. 2003 No. 409)
- Introductory Tenants (Review) Regulations (Northern Ireland) 2003 (S.R. 2003 No. 410)
- Secure Tenancies (Notice) (Amendment) Regulations (Northern Ireland) 2003 (S.R. 2003 No. 411)
- Social Security (Third Party Deductions and Miscellaneous Amendments) Regulations (Northern Ireland) 2003 (S.R. 2003 No. 412)
- Income Support (General) (Amendment) Regulations (Northern Ireland) 2003 (S.R. 2003 No. 413)
- Notification of Installations Handling Hazardous Substances (Amendment) Regulations (Northern Ireland) 2003 (S.R. 2003 No. 415)
- Justice (Northern Ireland) Act 2002 (Commencement No. 4) Order 2003 (S.R. 2003 No. 416)
- Social Security (Miscellaneous Amendments No. 2) Regulations (Northern Ireland) 2003 (S.R. 2003 No. 417)
- Housing Benefit (State Pension Credit and Miscellaneous Amendments) Regulations (Northern Ireland) 2003 (S.R. 2003 No. 418)
- Misuse of Drugs (Amendment) (No. 3) Regulations (Northern Ireland) 2003 (S.R. 2003 No. 420)
- State Pension Credit (Transitional and Miscellaneous Provisions) (Amendment) Regulations (Northern Ireland) 2003 (S.R. 2003 No. 421)
- Measuring Equipment (Liquid Fuel and Lubricants) (Amendment) Regulations (Northern Ireland) 2003 (S.R. 2003 No. 422)
- Health and Safety (Miscellaneous Amendments) Regulations (Northern Ireland) 2003 (S.R. 2003 No. 423)
- Optical Charges and Payments and General Ophthalmic Services (Amendment No. 2) Regulations (Northern Ireland) 2003 (S.R. 2003 No. 424)
- Classical Swine Fever Order (Northern Ireland) 2003 (S.R. 2003 No. 425)
- Employer's Liability (Compulsory Insurance) Exemption (Amendment) Regulations (Northern Ireland) 2003 (S.R. 2003 No. 426)
- Health and Personal Social Services (Assessment of Resources) (Amendment No. 2) Regulations (Northern Ireland) 2003 (S.R. 2003 No. 428)
- Motor Vehicles (Construction and Use) (Amendment No. 3) Regulations (Northern Ireland) 2003 (S.R. 2003 No. 431)
- Housing Benefit (State Pension Credit and Miscellaneous Amendments) (Amendment) Regulations (Northern Ireland) 2003 (S.R. 2003 No. 432)
- Local Government Pension Scheme (Management and Investment of Funds) (Amendment) Regulations (Northern Ireland) 2003 (S.R. 2003 No. 433)
- Public Service Vehicles (Conditions of Fitness, Equipment and Use) (Amendment No. 2) Regulations (Northern Ireland) 2003 (S.R. 2003 No. 434)
- Pesticides (Maximum Residue Levels in Crops, Food and Feeding Stuffs) (Amendment) (No. 3) Regulations (Northern Ireland) 2003 (S.R. 2003 No. 435)
- Police Trainee (Amendment) Regulations (Northern Ireland) 2003 (S.R. 2003 No. 436)
- Legal Advice and Assistance (Amendment) Regulations (Northern Ireland) 2003 (S.R. 2003 No. 437)
- Legal Aid (General) (Amendment) Regulations (Northern Ireland) 2003 (S.R. 2003 No. 438)
- Access to Justice (Northern Ireland) Order 2003 (Commencement No. 1) (Amendment) Order (Northern Ireland) 2003 (S.R. 2003 No. 439)
- Access to Justice (Northern Ireland) Order 2003 (Commencement No. 2) Order (Northern Ireland) 2003 (S.R. 2003 No. 440)
- Planning (Amendment) (2003 Order) (Commencement No. 2) Order (Northern Ireland) 2003 (S.R. 2003 No. 443)
- Planning (Trees) Regulations (Northern Ireland) 2003 (S.R. 2003 No. 444)
- Planning (General Development) (Amendment No. 2) Order (Northern Ireland) 2003 (S.R. 2003 No. 445)
- Planning (Fees) (Amendment No. 2) Regulations (Northern Ireland) 2003 (S.R. 2003 No. 446)
- Health and Personal Social Services (Amendments Relating to Prescribing by Nurses and Pharmacists etc.) Regulations (Northern Ireland) 2003 (S.R. 2003 No. 447)
- Food (Provisions Relating to Labelling) Regulations (Northern Ireland) 2003 (S.R. 2003 No. 448)
- Public Service Vehicles (Amendment No. 2) Regulations (Northern Ireland) 2003 (S.R. 2003 No. 449)
- Smoke Control Areas (Authorised Fuels) Regulations (Northern Ireland) 2003 (S.R. 2003 No. 450)
- Management of Health and Safety at Work and Fire Precautions (Workplace) (Amendment) Regulations (Northern Ireland) 2003 (S.R. 2003 No. 454)
- Income Support (General) (Standard Interest Rate Amendment) Regulations (Northern Ireland) 2003 (S.R. 2003 No. 455)
- Marketing of Potatoes (Amendment) Regulations (Northern Ireland) 2003 (S.R. 2003 No. 456)
- Seed Potatoes (Tuber and Label Fees) (Amendment) Regulations (Northern Ireland) 2003 (S.R. 2003 No. 457)
- Plant Health (Amendment No. 2) Order (Northern Ireland) 2003 (S.R. 2003 No. 458)
- Students Awards Regulations (Northern Ireland) 2003 (S.R. 2003 No. 459)
- Police (Northern Ireland) Act 2000 (Designated Places of Detention No. 2) Order 2003 (S.R. 2003 No. 460)
- Food Protection (Emergency Prohibitions) Order (Northern Ireland) 2003 (S.R. 2003 No. 462)
- Housing Renovation etc. Grants (Grant Limit) Order (Northern Ireland) 2003 (S.R. 2003 No. 463)
- Home Repair Assistance Grant Regulations (Northern Ireland) 2003 (S.R. 2003 No. 464)
- Housing Replacement Grant Regulations (Northern Ireland) 2003 (S.R. 2003 No. 465)
- Marriage (2003 Order) (Commencement) Order (Northern Ireland) 2003 (S.R. 2003 No. 466)
- Births, Deaths and Marriages (Fees) Order (Northern Ireland) 2003 (S.R. 2003 No. 467)
- Marriage Regulations (Northern Ireland) 2003 (S.R. 2003 No. 468)
- Child Support (Miscellaneous Amendments) Regulations (Northern Ireland) 2003 (S.R. 2003 No. 469)
- Electricity (Guarantees of Origin of Electricity Produced from Renewable Energy Sources) Regulations (Northern Ireland) 2003 (S.R. 2003 No. 470)
- Crown Court (Amendment No. 3) Rules (Northern Ireland) 2003 (S.R. 2003 No. 471)
- Organic Farming (Conversion of Animal Housing) Scheme (Northern Ireland) 2003 (S.R. 2003 No. 472)
- Youth Conference Rules (Northern Ireland) 2003 (S.R. 2003 No. 473)
- Juries (Northern Ireland) Order 1996 (Amendment) Regulations 2003 (S.R. 2003 No. 474)
- Feeding Stuffs (Amendment No. 3) Regulations (Northern Ireland) 2003 (S.R. 2003 No. 475)
- Criminal Evidence (Northern Ireland) Order 1999 (Commencement No. 2) Order 2003 (S.R. 2003 No. 476)
- Magistrates' Courts (Amendment No. 2) Rules (Northern Ireland) 2003 (S.R. 2003 No. 477)
- Magistrates' Courts (Criminal Justice (Children)) (Amendment) Rules (Northern Ireland) 2003 (S.R. 2003 No. 478)
- Community Responsibility Order Rules (Northern Ireland) 2003 (S.R. 2003 No. 479)
- Reparation Order Rules (Northern Ireland) 2003 (S.R. 2003 No. 480)
- Education (Listed Bodies) Order (Northern Ireland) 2003 (S.R. 2003 No. 481)
- Election Against Benefits Regulations (Northern Ireland) 2003 (S.R. 2003 No. 482)
- Election Against Benefits (No. 2) Regulations (Northern Ireland) 2003 (S.R. 2003 No. 483)
- Food Protection (Emergency Prohibitions) (Revocation) Order (Northern Ireland) 2003 (S.R. 2003 No. 484)
- County Court (Amendment No. 3) Rules (Northern Ireland) 2003 (S.R. 2003 No. 485)
- Social Security Pensions (Home Responsibilities) (Amendment) Regulations (Northern Ireland) 2003 (S.R. 2003 No. 486)
- Occupational Pensions (Revaluation) Order (Northern Ireland) 2003 (S.R. 2003 No. 487)
- Justice (Northern Ireland) Act 2002 (Commencement No. 5) Order 2003 (S.R. 2003 No. 488)
- Waste and Contaminated Land (1997 Order) (Commencement No. 7) Order (Northern Ireland) 2003 (S.R. 2003 No. 489)
- Sheep Annual Premium (Amendment) Regulations (Northern Ireland) 2003 (S.R. 2003 No. 490)
- Measuring Instruments (EEC Requirements) (Verification Fees) Regulations (Northern Ireland) 2003 (S.R. 2003 No. 491)
- Weights and Measures (Passing as Fit for Use for Trade and Adjustment Fees) Regulations (Northern Ireland) 2003 (S.R. 2003 No. 492)
- Waste Management Licensing Regulations (Northern Ireland) 2003 (S.R. 2003 No. 493)
- African Swine Fever Order (Northern Ireland) 2003 (S.R. 2003 No. 494)
- Animal By-Products Regulations (Northern Ireland) 2003 (S.R. 2003 No. 495)
- Landfill Regulations (Northern Ireland) 2003 (S.R. 2003 No. 496)
- Employment Equality (Sexual Orientation) Regulations (Northern Ireland) 2003 (S.R. 2003 No. 497)
- Industrial Tribunals (Interest on Awards in Sexual Orientation Discrimination Cases) Regulations (Northern Ireland) 2003 (S.R. 2003 No. 498)
- Inshore Fishing (Prohibition of Fishing and Fishing Methods) (Amendment) Regulations (Northern Ireland) 2003 (S.R. 2003 No. 499)

== 501-600 ==
- Domestic Energy Efficiency Grants (Amendment No. 2) Regulations (Northern Ireland) 2003 (S.R. 2003 No. 503)
- Animal By-Products (Identification) (Amendment No. 2) Regulations (Northern Ireland) 2003 (S.R. 2003 No. 504)
- Food (Brazil Nuts) (Emergency Control) (Amendment) Regulations (Northern Ireland) 2003 (S.R. 2003 No. 505)
- Land Registry (Fees) Order (Northern Ireland) 2003 (S.R. 2003 No. 506)
- Transmissible Spongiform Encephalopathy (Amendment) Regulations (Northern Ireland) 2003 (S.R. 2003 No. 509)
- Health and Safety (Fees) Regulations (Northern Ireland) 2003 (S.R. 2003 No. 510)
- Legal Aid in Criminal Proceedings (Costs) (Amendment) Rules (Northern Ireland) 2003 (S.R. 2003 No. 511)
- Legal Aid for Youth Conferences (Costs) Rules (Northern Ireland) 2003 (S.R. 2003 No. 512)
- Legal Aid Certificates (Amendment) Rules (Northern Ireland) 2003 (S.R. 2003 No. 513)
- Legal Aid in Criminal Cases (Statement of Means) (Amendment) Rules (Northern Ireland) 2003 (S.R. 2003 No. 514)
- Goods Vehicles (Community Authorisations) (Amendment of the Road Traffic (Northern Ireland) Order 1981) Regulations (Northern Ireland) 2003 (S.R. 2003 No. 515)
- Motor Vehicles (Driving Licences) (Amendment No. 4) Regulations (Northern Ireland) 2003 (S.R. 2003 No. 516)
- Motor Vehicles (Construction and Use) (Amendment No. 4) Regulations (Northern Ireland) 2003 (S.R. 2003 No. 517)
- Motor Vehicles Testing (Amendment) Regulations (Northern Ireland) 2003 (S.R. 2003 No. 518)
- Jam and Similar Products Regulations (Northern Ireland) 2003 (S.R. 2003 No. 519)
- Fair Employment and Treatment Order (Amendment) Regulations (Northern Ireland) 2003 (S.R. 2003 No. 520)
- Fair Employment (Specification of Public Authorities) (Amendment) Order (Northern Ireland) 2003 (S.R. 2003 No. 521)
- Child Support (Information, Evidence and Disclosure) (Amendment) Regulations (Northern Ireland) 2003 (S.R. 2003 No. 522)
- Dundrod Circuit (Admission Charges) Regulations (Northern Ireland) 2003 (S.R. 2003 No. 523)
- Foyle Area and Carlingford Area (Licensing of Fishing Engines) (Amendment No. 2) Regulations 2003 (S.R. 2003 No. 524)
- Fisheries Byelaws (Northern Ireland) 2003 (S.R. 2003 No. 525)
- Legal Aid in Criminal Proceedings (Costs) (Amendment No. 2) Rules (Northern Ireland) 2003 (S.R. 2003 No. 526)
- Social Security (Notification of Change of Circumstances) Regulations (Northern Ireland) 2003 (S.R. 2003 No. 527)
- Housing (2003 Order) (Commencement No. 2) Order (Northern Ireland) 2003 (S.R. 2003 No. 528)
- Infant Formula and Follow-on Formula (Amendment) Regulations (Northern Ireland) 2003 (S.R. 2003 No. 529)
- Processed Cereal-based Foods and Baby Foods for Infants and Young Children Regulations (Northern Ireland) 2003 (S.R. 2003 No. 530)
- Street Works (Recovery of Costs) Regulations (Northern Ireland) 2003 (S.R. 2003 No. 531)
- Railways Regulations (Northern Ireland) 2003 (S.R. 2003 No. 532)
- Packaging, Labelling and Carriage of Radioactive Material by Rail Regulations (Northern Ireland) 2003 (S.R. 2003 No. 533)
- Game Preservation (Special Protection for Irish Hares) Order (Northern Ireland) 2003 (S.R. 2003 No. 534)
- Miscellaneous Food Additives (Amendment No. 2) Regulations (Northern Ireland) 2003 (S.R. 2003 No. 535)
- Rules of the Supreme Court (Northern Ireland) (Amendment No. 3) 2003 (S.R. 2003 No. 536)
- Motor Vehicles (Construction and Use) (Amendment No. 5) Regulations (Northern Ireland) 2003 (S.R. 2003 No. 537)
- Registration of Establishments (Laying Hens) Regulations (Northern Ireland) 2003 (S.R. 2003 No. 538)
- Air Quality (Amendment) Regulations (Northern Ireland) 2003 (S.R. 2003 No. 543)
- Water Environment (Water Framework Directive) Regulations (Northern Ireland) 2003 (S.R. 2003 No. 544)
- Insolvency (2002 Order) (Commencement) Order (Northern Ireland) 2003 (S.R. 2003 No. 545)
- Insolvency (2002 Order) (Transitional Provisions) Order (Northern Ireland) 2003 (S.R. 2003 No. 546)
- Insolvency Practitioners (Amendment) Regulations (Northern Ireland) 2003 (S.R. 2003 No. 547)
- Marketing and Use of Dangerous Substances (No. 4) Regulations (Northern Ireland) 2003 (S.R. 2003 No. 548)
- Insolvency (Amendment) Rules (Northern Ireland) 2003 (S.R. 2003 No. 549)
- Insolvent Partnerships (Amendment No. 3) Order (Northern Ireland) 2003 (S.R. 2003 No. 550)
- Home Repair Assistance Grant (Amendment) Regulations (Northern Ireland) 2003 (S.R. 2003 No. 551)
- Justice (Northern Ireland) Act 2002 (Amendment of section 46 (C.1) and paragraph 7 (C.2) of Schedule 8) Order 2003 (S.R. 2003 No. 552)
- Flags Regulations (Northern Ireland) (Amendment) 2002 (S.R. 2003 No. 553))
