= Hampson v Dept of Education and Science =

Hampson v Department of Education and Science
- Court: Court of Appeal
- Citation: [1990] 2 All ER 25, [1989] IRLR 69, [1989] ICR 179

Keywords
- Objective justification, indirect discrimination

Hampson v Department of Education and Science [1989] ICR 179 is a UK labour law case, concerning the test for justification of discrimination.

== Facts ==
A language teacher from Hong Kong had done a two-year training course at home. She came to the UK where the requirement was for three-year qualifications. She did a further one-year training course. The Secretary of State refused to recognise her qualification as comparable, because her three years was not consecutive. She argued this was race discrimination. However, the Secretary of State argued it fell within the exception under the Race Relations Act 1976 section 41 (acts done under statutory authority).

== Judgment ==
The Court of Appeal, upholding the EAT, found for the Department under RRA 1976 section 41. Balcombe LJ, dissenting, would have remitted the case to tribunal to assess justification. He set out the current approach for justification, relying on Rainey v Greater Glasgow Health Board which incorporated the test given in Bilka-Kaufhaus GmbH v Weber von Hartz.

[It] requires an objective balance between the discriminatory effect of the condition and the reasonable needs of the party who applies the condition…. the employer had to show a real need on the part of the undertaking, objectively justified, although that need was not confined to economic grounds; it might, for instance, include administrative efficiency in a concern not engaged in commerce or business. Clearly it may, as in the present case, be possible to justify by reference to grounds other than economic or administrative efficiency.

The approach given in the dissent was preferred on appeal to the Lords, who overturned the decision on the issue of immunity.

== See also ==
- UK labour law
- EU labour law
