= Turner-Samuels =

Turner-Samuels is a surname. Notable people with the surname include:

- David Turner-Samuels (1918–2016), British barrister
- Moss Turner-Samuels (1888–1957), British politician
