= Jones v Post Office =

- Court: Court of Appeal of England and Wales
- Decided: 11 April 2001
- Citation: [2001] EWCA Civ 558, [2001] IRLR 384

Court membership
- Judges sitting: Kay LJ, Arden LJ, Pill LJ

Keywords
- Employment, Discrimination

Jones v Post Office [2001] IRLR 384 is a UK labour law case, under the Disability Discrimination Act 1995.

== Facts ==
Mr Jones was a Royal Mail driver. He became diabetic and insulin dependent and was removed from driving duties. The Post had done their own medical appraisal, which turned out to be wrong. He alleged that his dismissal was unfair.

== Judgment ==
The Court of Appeal, in a controversial decision, held it was not. Pill LJ said "Where a properly conducted risk assessment provides a reason which is on its face both material and substantial, and is not irrational, the tribunal cannot substitute its own appraisal."

Arden LJ said "the word substantial [s.5(3)] does not mean that the employer must necessarily have reached the best conclusion that could be reached in the light of all known medical science. Employers are not obliged to search for the Holy Grail."

== Subsequent developments ==
This case has been subject to considerable academic criticism, for introducing (without any apparent statutory authority) a "reasonable range of responses" test. A number of cases after have limited and tacitly undermined its effect.

- Paul v National Probation Service [2004] IRLR 190
- Collins v Royal National Theatre Board Ltd [2004] IRLR 395

== See also ==
- UK employment discrimination law
- UK labour law
- Human Rights Act 1998
