= Redmond-Bate v DPP =

1999 British court case

Redmond-Bate v Director of Public Prosecutions
- Court: High Court of Justice
- Decided: 23 July 1999
- Citation: [1999] Crim LR 998, [1999] 28 SLR 16, [1999] SLRYB 47, [2000] HRLR 249,
- Transcript: Full text of judgment

Court membership
- Judges sitting: Lord Justice Sedley; Mr. Justice Collins

Redmond-Bate v Director of Public Prosecutions [1999] EWHC Admin 733, was a case heard before the Queen's Bench Division of the High Court regarding freedom of speech and breach of the peace. The decision upheld the freedom to express lawful matters in a way which other people might take great exception to; that the right to free speech, enshrined in Article 10 of the European Convention of Human Rights, includes the right to be offensive; and a police officer has no right to call upon a citizen to desist from lawful conduct. That others might react unlawfully does not itself render the actions of the speaker unlawful.

== Facts ==
On 2 October 1997, the appellant, Alison Redmond-Bate, and two other women, all members of an evangelistic Christian organization, were preaching outside Wakefield Cathedral. The police received complaints about them and a policeman warned the three women not to interrupt people walking by. They ignored him, and after twenty minutes, a crowd of more than a hundred people had gathered (most of which showed hostility towards the three women). The policeman once again asked the women to stop preaching, and when they refused to do so, they were arrested. Redmond-Bate was later convicted at Wakefield Magistrates Court and charged with "obstructing a police officer in the execution of his duty."

The appeal to the High Court concerned the following questions of law:

1. "In the circumstances of this case, was it reasonable for the police officer to arrest the appellant who had not conducted herself in a manner which would be said to constitute an offence under the Public Order Act 1986 when any apprehension by the police officer of violence or threat of violence which could be said to be likely to breach criminal law emanated from others present?"
2. "Whether it was proper for the Court to conclude that such actual or threatened violence was or would be the natural consequence of the appellant’s actions?"

== Judgment ==
Sedley LJ's opinion was as follows.

I am unable to see any lawful basis for the arrest or therefore the conviction... There was no suggestion of highway obstruction. Nobody had to stop and listen. If they did so, they were as free to express the view that the preachers should be locked up or silenced as the appellant and her companions were to preach.

Mr. Kealy for the prosecutor submitted that if there are two alternative sources of trouble, a constable can properly take steps against either. This is right, but only if both are threatening violence or behaving in a manner that might provoke violence.

Free speech includes not only the inoffensive but the irritating, the contentious, the eccentric, the heretical, the unwelcome and the provocative provided it does not tend to provoke violence. Freedom only to speak inoffensively is not worth having. What Speakers' Corner (where the law applies as fully as anywhere else) demonstrates is the tolerance which is both extended by the law to opinion of every kind and expected by the law in the conduct of those who disagree, even strongly, with what they hear.

From the condemnation of Socrates to the persecution of modern writers and journalists, our world has seen too many examples of state control of unofficial ideas.

A central purpose of the European Convention on Human Rights has been to set close limits to any such assumed power. We in this country continue to owe a debt to the jury which in 1670 refused to convict the Quakers William Penn and William Mead for preaching ideas which offended against state orthodoxy.

To proceed, as the Crown Court did, from the fact that the three women were preaching about morality, God and the Bible (the topic not only of sermons preached on every Sunday of the year but of at least one regular daily slot on national radio) to a reasonable apprehension that violence is going to erupt is, with great respect, both illiberal and illogical.

The situation perceived and recounted by PC Tennant did not justify him in apprehending a breach of the peace, much less a breach of the peace for which the three women would be responsible. No more were the Magistrates justified in convicting the appellant or the Crown Court in upholding the conviction. For the reasons I have given, the constable was not acting in the execution of his duty when he required the women to stop preaching, and the appellant was therefore not guilty of obstructing him in the execution of his duty when she refused to comply.

Although, therefore, the Crown Court's questions do not pose the key issue, I would answer both questions in the negative and allow this appeal.
