= Lewisham LBC v Malcolm =

Lewisham LBC v Malcolm and EHRC
- Court: House of Lords
- Citation: [2008] UKHL 43, [2008] IRLR 700

Court membership
- Judges sitting: Lord Bingham of Cornhill; Lord Scott of Foscote; Baroness Hale of Richmond; Lord Brown of Eaton-under-Heywood; Lord Neuberger of Abbotsbury

Lewisham London Borough Council v Malcolm was a case concerning disability discrimination and the application of equality legislation in the United Kingdom, relevant for UK labour law. It replaced the head of disability-related discrimination from the DDA 1995 with the Equality Act 2010 section 15 on discrimination arising from disability.

== Facts ==
Courtney Malcolm, a secure council tenant in Lewisham, had schizophrenia. He sublet his house, forfeiting his right to buy under the Housing Act 1985 section 93. At the time, Malcolm had not been taking his medication. The council, unaware of Malcolm's schizophrenia, terminated his tenancy and gave him a notice to quit. A possession order was granted on the basis that a causal connection between schizophrenia and subletting had not been established.

== Judgment ==
=== Court of Appeal ===
The Court of Appeal quashed the possession, saying it was contrary to DDA 1995 s 22(3) and that it was sufficiently in response to a disability-related reason as to satisfy s 24(1)(a). Questions raised included whether the disability had to have been on the council's mind for the discrimination to be disability-related and whether the comparator as someone who did not suffer from schizophrenia was one who had sublet or one who had not.

=== House of Lords ===
The House of Lords held that Malcolm had to show that the council's awareness of the disability had played some part in its decision to terminate the tenancy, and that he had not done so. Because of this, the Lords considered Clark v Novacold as wrongly decided; the correct comparator was someone who had sublet.

Baroness Hale, dissenting in part, said that Parliament could have made it entirely plain through wording that the comparison to be made under DDA 1995 section 24(1)(a) was with a person who did not have the disability in question, but that Parliament had deliberately not done so and chosen a different formulation. Accordingly, the comparison in the present case ought to be made with a person who had not sublet.

Lord Bingham's judgment was as follows.

The conduct of Mr Malcolm in subletting and ceasing to live in the flat let to him by the London Borough of Lewisham ("Lewisham") had the effect of destroying the security of tenure he had previously enjoyed and breaching the terms of his tenancy so as to give Lewisham what was, in terms of housing law, an unanswerable claim to possession. To defeat that claim Mr Malcolm relied, unsuccessfully before Her Honour Judge Hallon but successfully before the Court of Appeal (Arden, Longmore and Toulson LJJ: [2007] EWCA Civ 763, [2008] Ch 129), on the terms of sections 22 and 24 in Part III of the Disability Discrimination Act 1995. The question is whether, on the facts and a correct understanding of the law, he was entitled to do so.

By section 22(3)(c) of the 1995 Act, "It is unlawful for a person managing any premises to discriminate against a disabled person occupying those premises - ... by evicting the disabled person, or subjecting him to any other detriment". Section 24(1) provides that, for the purposes of section 22, a person discriminates against a disabled person if "(a) for a reason which relates to the disabled person's disability, he treats him less favourably than he treats or would treat others to whom that reason does not or would not apply; and (b) he cannot show that the treatment in question is justified". The permissible grounds of justification are specified in the section and none of them, it is agreed, is applicable in this case. By section 1, a person has a disability for the purposes of [the] Act if he has a physical or mental impairment which has a substantial and long-term adverse effect on his ability to carry out normal day-to-day activities."

These are the key provisions on which this appeal turns. They must be read purposively and in the context of the Act as a whole. It was an ambitious and complex Act, seeking (as I understand) to prevent disabled people being treated disadvantageously because of their disability. It sought to do this in a primarily negative way, by proscribing as unlawful certain acts of discrimination in several fields. As has been pointed out (Cases, Materials and Text on National, Supranational and International Non-Discrimination Law, ed Schiek, Waddington and Bell, 2007, p 132) the Act adopted a medical and not a social model of disability.

There are dangers in formulating lists of questions to be asked in situations such as this, since questions which are apposite in one case may be inapposite in another, and a jurisprudence may grow up around the terms of the questions when attention should be concentrated on the meaning and effect of the legislative text in question. But I think there are certain questions which call for an answer in this case, not all of which feature expressly among the issues framed by the parties.

(1) Was Mr Malcolm at the relevant time a disabled person?

The relevant time can only be the time of the action complained of. The judge, in a finely balanced decision (paras 32-42 of her judgment), concluded that Mr Malcolm was not at the relevant time a disabled person. The Court of Appeal took a different view ([2008] Ch 129, paras 69-94, 123-131, 149) for reasons which I would for my part accept. Mr Malcolm suffered, as he had for some years, from a well-known form of mental illness which had led to a number of hospital admissions, some of them involuntary. His illness was not disabling when controlled by appropriate medication, but when such medication was not being given his ability to carry out normal day-to-day activities was substantially impaired, as evidenced by his inability to do his job and his consequent dismissal. The reasoning of the Court of Appeal is to my mind persuasive, and I need not repeat it.

(2) To what treatment was Mr Malcolm subjected?

In the Court of Appeal it was common ground that the treatment alleged to constitute discrimination was Lewisham's claim to possession, although there was some argument about whether the notice to quit would also constitute unlawful discrimination (para 35). As Toulson LJ pointed out (para 144) the eviction process involves a number of steps (the service of the notice to quit, the issue of a claim form, the obtaining of an order for possession and, perhaps, the enforcement of a warrant for possession). It seems to me, however, as to him, to be artificial to break the process down into different stages. The treatment complained of was Lewisham's conduct in seeking possession of the flat.

(3) What was the reason for this treatment?

In the Court of Appeal it was common ground that the reason for that treatment was the subletting of the flat by Mr Malcolm (para 35). As a result he was no longer living there. On discovering that Mr Malcolm's sub-tenants were living in the flat and he was not, Lewisham took immediate steps to obtain possession.

It seems to me, as held in a very different context in Sivakumar v Secretary of State for the Home Department [2001] EWCA Civ 1196, [2002] INLR 310, para 23, adopted in Sepet v Secretary of State for the Home Department [2003] UKHL 15, [2003] 1 WLR 856, para 22, that the task of the court is to ascertain the real reason for the treatment, the reason which operates on the mind of the alleged discriminator. This may not be the reason given, and may not be the only reason, but the test is an objective one. Here, it seems to me inescapable that Lewisham, as a social landlord with a limited stock of housing and a heavy demand from those on its waiting list, acted as it did because it was not prepared to allow tenancies to continue where the tenant was not living in the premises demised. That, I think, was the real reason for the treatment, a reason in no way inconsistent with that which the parties agreed. Lewisham could have been the subject of reasonable criticism, and might even have been judicially reviewed, had it acted otherwise than it did in any ordinary case.

(4) Did that reason relate to Mr Malcolm's disability?

As well explained by Lindsay J in H J Heinz Co Ltd v Kenrick [2000] ICR 491, para 27, and Rowden v Dutton Gregory [2002] ICR 971, para 5, with reference to section 5 of the Act (which uses similar language) it seems clear that the draftsman of section 24(1)(a) deliberately eschewed the conventional language of causation in favour of the broader and less precise expression "relates to". In this context I take the expression to denote some connection, not necessarily close, between the reason and the disability. Judged by this yardstick, most of the decided cases and frequently-discussed examples fall into place. Thus, for example, the reason for the dismissal of the claimant in Taylor v OCS Group Ltd [2006] EWCA Civ 702, [2006] ICR 1602, namely the violation of the confidentiality of a colleague's computer files, had nothing whatever to do with his disability, which was deafness. By contrast, the dismissal of the absent claimant in Clark v Novacold [1999] ICR 951, the refusal of entry to a blind person with a dog or the refusal of service to a customer with eating difficulties (hypothetical examples considered in that case and elsewhere), or the dismissal for slowness of a one-legged postman (a hypothetical example discussed by Lindsay J in Heinz v Kenrick, above), would all, in my opinion, disclose a connection between the reason for dismissal and the disability in question. But in borderline cases it will be hard to decide whether there is or is not an adequate connection.

I would accept that, but for his mental illness, Mr Malcolm would probably not have behaved so irresponsibly as to sublet his flat and moved elsewhere. He had, after all, worked in Lewisham's housing department for a time, and must have been well aware of the ground rules. But Lewisham's reason for seeking possession - that Mr Malcolm had sublet the flat and gone to live elsewhere - was a pure housing management decision which had nothing whatever to do with his mental disability. With some hesitation I would resolve this issue against Mr Malcolm.

(5) With the treatment of what comparators should the treatment of Mr Malcolm be compared?

In Williams v Richmond Court (Swansea) Ltd [2006] EWCA Civ 1719, para 41, Richards LJ suggested that section 24(1) of the 1995 Act required the court " ... (iv) to identify the comparators, namely persons to whom the reason does not or would not apply ...". This formulation was quoted with apparent approval in the present case by Longmore LJ (para 132) and Toulson LJ (para 143), although somewhat discounted by Arden LJ (paras 35-36). It seems to me that Richards LJ's formulation exactly reflects the statutory language and focuses accurately on the comparison which section 24(1)(a) requires.

The problem of identifying the correct comparator is one which Mummery LJ examined with care and in detail in Clark v Novacold. The problem can be re-stated on the facts of the present case, assuming (contrary to the conclusion I have expressed in answer to question (4) above) that Lewisham's treatment of Mr Malcolm was for a reason which related to Mr Malcolm's disability. Are "the others" with whose treatment the treatment of Mr Malcolm is to be compared (a) persons without a mental disability who have sublet a Lewisham flat and gone to live elsewhere, or (b) tenants of Lewisham flats who have not sublet or gone to live elsewhere, or (c) some other comparator group, and if so what?

As I understand the judgment in Clark v Novacold, the correct comparison is said to be with group (b). But that, I think, is difficult to accept for the reason succinctly given by Toulson LJ (para 155): "the complainant is logically bound to be able to satisfy the requirement of showing that his treatment is less favourable than would be accorded to others to whom the reason for his treatment did not apply. For without the reason there would not be the treatment."

The truth of that observation is vividly illustrated by the present case: if a tenant had not sublet and gone to live elsewhere Lewisham would not, in the absence of other grounds, have contemplated seeking possession (or, probably, been entitled to do so), and thus no question of discrimination could ever have arisen.

A more natural comparison, as it seems to me, is with group (a). On this analysis the comparison would fall to be made on the bases rejected in Clark v Novacold: with a person who had a dog but no disability or a diner who was a very untidy eater but had no disability-related reason for eating in that way. This, as I have said, seems to me a much more natural comparison, in no way inconsistent with the statutory language. In this case it would defeat Mr Malcolm's complaint of discrimination, since it is clear that Lewisham would have claimed possession against any non-disabled tenant who had sublet and gone to live elsewhere. The same result would be likely to follow in many cases, with the consequence that the reach of the statute would be reduced. That would make it attractive, if possible, to identify an intermediate comparator group (c) which would avoid absurdity and give fair effect to the statute. But I do not think that any such intermediate comparator group has been suggested, and none is identified by the statutory language. I find it hard to accept that Novacold was rightly decided. I am in any event satisfied that a different principle must be applied in the present context.

I would accordingly, not without misgiving, hold the correct comparison in this case (on the assumption indicated) to be with persons without a mental disability who have sublet a Lewisham flat and gone to live elsewhere. Mr Malcolm has not been treated less favourably than such persons. He has been treated in exactly the same way.

(6) Is it relevant whether Lewisham knew of Mr Malcolm's disability?

It has been held that the alleged discriminator's knowledge of a complainant's disability is irrelevant (London Borough of Hammersmith and Fulham v Farnsworth [2000] IRLR 691, para 36), although some doubt about this conclusion has been expressed by the Employment Appeal Tribunal (Heinz v Kenrick, above, paras 44-48) and the Court of Appeal (Manchester City Council v Romano (Disability Rights Commission intervening) [2004] EWCA Civ 834, [2005] 1 WLR 2775, paras 121-123).

Section 25(1) provides that a claim based on unlawful discrimination on grounds of disability may be made the subject of civil proceedings in the same way as any other claim in tort, damages being recoverable (section 25(2)) for injury to feelings in addition to other relevant heads of damage. This points, in my opinion, towards a requirement of knowledge. Otherwise, an actionable tort would arise on the following facts. A telephones restaurant B to book a table. He asks if he may bring a dog. B says that dogs are not allowed in its restaurant. A does not say, and B does not know, that A is blind. It seems to me contrary to principle to hold that on such facts B has committed an actionable tort sounding in damages. Like Toulson LJ in the Court of Appeal, para 161, "I do not believe that Parliament would have intended to make a person liable in tort for disability discrimination if that person had no awareness or grounds for awareness at the relevant time that the complainant was suffering from a disability or that his disability might have any connection with the matters giving rise to the treatment said to constitute unlawful discrimination."

The grounds of justification specified in section 24(3) of the 1995 Act assume, I think, that the landlord has knowledge of the tenant's disability, as Arden LJ was tentatively willing to accept (para 119), although reaching a different conclusion (paras 112-118). This seems to me to reinforce the conclusion that knowledge, or at least imputed knowledge, is necessary. It would be anomalous if a landlord needs to know of the tenant's disability if he is to justify but not otherwise.

(7) Has Mr Malcolm a defence to Lewisham's claim for possession?

It follows from what I have said that Mr Malcolm has not been the subject of unlawful discrimination because Lewisham's reason for claiming possession did not relate to his disability and he was not treated less favourably than someone without that disability. It would also seem that Lewisham were unaware of Mr Malcolm's disability, at any rate when the process of claiming possession was initiated. Thus Mr Malcolm has no defence to Lewisham's claim. I would expect this result to follow in almost all cases in which a landlord, public or private, claims possession from a tenant who has committed a gross breach of the terms of the tenancy, as it did in S v Floyd (The Equality and Human Rights Commission intervening) [2008] EWCA Civ 201, para 48, where Mummery LJ, giving the judgment of the Court of Appeal, said:

"It is not immediately obvious ... (b) how a landlord would be unlawfully discriminating against a disabled tenant by taking steps to enforce his statutory right to a possession order for admitted non-payment of rent for 132 weeks ... The legislation is not about disability per se: it is about unlawful acts of discrimination on a prohibited ground, ie, unjustified less favourable treatment for a reason which relates to the disabled person's disability."

I would not, however, accede to Lewisham's contention, accepted by the judge but rejected by the Court of Appeal, that a claim for possession to which there is no defence under housing legislation can never be defeated even where the claim is shown to be discriminatory. Parliament has enacted that discriminatory acts proscribed by the 1995 Act are unlawful. The courts cannot be required to give legal effect to acts proscribed as unlawful. But I would not expect such a defence, in this field, to be made out very often.

For these reasons and in broad agreement with all my noble and learned friends save in answering question (5), I would allow the appeal and reinstate the judge's order.

== See also ==
- Equality Act 2010
- Clark v TDG Ltd (t/a Novacold Ltd)
