= Miles v Wakefield Metropolitan District Council =

Miles v Wakefield MDC
- Court: House of Lords
- Citations: [1987] UKHL 15, [1987] AC 539

Keywords
- Contract of employment

Miles v Wakefield Metropolitan District Council [1987] UKHL 15 is a UK labour law case, concerning the theory of partial performance and strike action. Its authority has been questioned since.

== Facts ==
Mr Miles worked a 37-hour week as a births, deaths and marriages registrar. Following the union, National Association of Local Government Officers, in industrial action he stopped working on Saturday mornings for weddings. He did other work, but refused to do weddings. The council said this amounted to three hours less per week, and deducted three 37ths from his pay. Derry Irvine QC argued for the Council. Stephen Sedley QC argued for Mr Miles.

In the High Court, Nicholls J said that the pay could be deducted. In the Court of Appeal, Parker LJ and Fox LJ said that unless he was dismissed, the council could not deduct pay. Eveleigh LJ dissented.

== Judgment ==
The House of Lords held that pay could be deducted for the whole week. If the work is accepted out of necessity, then it is not contractual wages which are recoverable, but a quantum meruit.

Lord Bridge said the following.

If an employee refuses to perform the full duties which can be required of him under his contract of service, the employer is entitled to refuse to accept any partial performance. The position then resulting, during any relevant period while these conditions obtain, is exactly as if the employee were refusing to work at all.

Lord Brightman said the following.

If an employee offers partial performance, as he does in some types of industrial conflict falling short of a strike, the employer has a choice. He may decline to accept the partial performance that is offered, in which case the employee is entitled to no remuneration for his unwanted services, even if they are performed.

Lord Templeman said that an employee and a government office holder should be treated alike, just as a Dickensian or Thackeray example of a person at the Department of Circumlocution and Sealing Wax suggested.

For the past two years teachers have been engaged in sporadic strike action, usually on one day in a week. If Mr Sedley is right, educational authorities must pay for strike days unless after each day's strike they issue dismissal notices. To show that the educational authorities have no intention of ruining the educational system by insisting on dismissal, the dismissal notice must presumably be accompanied by a reinstatement notice. This would finally submerge the teaching profession in paper.

The consequences of Mr. Sedley's submissions demonstrate that his analysis of a contract of employment is deficient. It cannot be right that an employer should be compelled to pay something for nothing whether he dismisses or retains a worker. In a contract of employment wages and work go together. The employer pays for work and the worker works for his wages. If the employer declines to pay, the worker need not work. If the worker declines to work, the employer need not pay....

[...]

‘In those circumstances [of "go slow" action], the worker cannot claim that he is entitled to his wages under the contract because he is deliberately working in a manner designed to harm the employer. But the worker will be entitled to be paid on a quantum meruit basis for the amount and value of the reduced work performed and accepted.

== See also ==
- United Kingdom labour law
