= Archibald v Fife Council =

- Court: House of Lords
- Decided: 1 July 2004
- Citation: [2004] 4 All ER 303, [2004] IRLR 651, [2004] ICR 954
- Transcript: Full text on Bailii

Court membership
- Judges sitting: Lord Nicholls of Birkenhead, Lord Hope of Craighead, Lord Rodger of Earlsferry, Baroness Hale of Richmond and Lord Brown of Eaton-under-Heywood

Archibald v Fife Council [2004] UKHL 32 is a UK labour law case, concerning the Disability Discrimination Act 1995.

== Facts ==
Mrs Archibald was employed as a road sweeper for Fife Council. She had surgery in 1999, but there were complications. She lost the ability to walk and could no longer work. The council kept her as an office worker. She was placed on the shortlist for all upcoming vacancies. As Baroness Hale said in her statement of the facts,

Over the next few months, [Mrs Archibald] applied for over 100 posts within the council. These were all on the APT&C scale rather than on the Manual Worker Grade 1 scale. The basic wage was very slightly higher than for the manual grade. According to the council's redeployment policy, people seeking redeployment at a higher grade had to undertake competitive interviews. Mrs Archibald failed to obtain any of these posts. She told the Employment Tribunal that she did not think that this was anything to do with her disability but rather that 'they' did not look past the fact that she was a road sweeper - someone coming from an industrial background having to compete with others from a staff background. Eventually, as she was still unable to return to work as a road sweeper and the redeployment procedure had been exhausted, she was dismissed on grounds of incapacity from 12 March 2001.

Mrs Archibald argued at the employment tribunal that her dismissal was unlawful under s 4(2) DDA 1995 for discrimination in failing in their duty to make reasonable adjustments (s 6) and causing her substantial disadvantage, particularly the requirement for competitive interviews.

The employment tribunal held that the council's treatment was justified under s 5(1)(b) DDA 1995. The request that competitive interviews be removed would have been too favourable, contrary to s 6(7). Both the Employment Appeal Tribunal and the Inner House of the Court of Session dismissed her appeals.

== Judgment ==
The House of Lords allowed Mrs Archibald's appeal. It held that under s 5 DDA 1995, no finding may be made that less favourable treatment is justified unless the duty to make reasonable adjustments is taken into account. The employer must have made reasonable adjustments, and only then can it be asked whether less favourable treatment (in this case, not hiring Mrs Archibald in the office) is justified. Accordingly, under s 6(3)(c), the duty to make reasonable adjustments included transferring an employee to "fill an existing vacancy" and this can include the possibility that a disabled person be placed at the same or higher grade without any competitive interview if that is reasonable under the circumstances. Such favourable treatment was not at all precluded by s 6(7), which should be read subject to the previous provisions of the section. Furthermore, the duty under the DDA 1995 to make reasonable adjustments overrode the Local Government and Housing Act 1989 s 7 requiring that staff be appointed by merit.

In conclusion, the tribunal had never considered whether the council had fulfilled its s 6 duty, and that the case should be remitted to determine that question.

== See also ==
- UK employment discrimination law
