= Paul v National Probation Service =

- Court: Employment Appeal Tribunal
- Decided: 13 November 2003
- Citation: [2003] UKEAT 0290_03_1311

Paul v National Probation Service [2004] IRLR 190, [2003] UKEAT 0290_03_1311 is a UK labour law case, concerning the duty of an employer to make reasonable adjustments to accommodate employees with disabilities.

== Facts ==
Mr Paul was chronically depressed, and was turned down for a job at the National Probation Service. This was on the basis of the employer's own medical report. But they did not go to ask the applicant's own doctor, or take steps to investigate how far the illness actually affected Mr Paul's potential work capability. Mr Paul claimed constructive dismissal under the Disability Discrimination Act 1995.

== Judgment ==
The Employment Appeal Tribunal held that the employer did not consider its duty to adjust. It could not argue that it had no duty to accommodate Mr Paul, because a minimum step would be to look at what was possible. The simple first steps included getting advice from the claimant's own consultant and thinking about ways the job may also have been changed.

== See also ==
- UK employment discrimination law
- UK labour law
- Human Rights Act 1998
