= Clark v TDG Ltd =

Clark v TDG Ltd (t/a Novacold Ltd) [1999] IRLR 318 is a UK labour law case concerning the Disability Discrimination Act 1995.

== Facts ==
Mr Clark was injured at work (a frozen food warehouse in Hull). He was then dismissed when an orthopaedic doctor said he did not know when he would be able to start again.

== Judgment ==
Mummery LJ said that the DDA drew no distinction between direct and indirect discrimination, and a justification defence is always available. The comparator was someone who was not disabled and could do the work. There certainly was discrimination, but on the question of justification, no attention had been paid to the Code of Practice.

== Significance ==
Since Directive 2000/78/EC, there has been an amendment to the Disability Discrimination Act so that a distinction between direct and indirect discrimination was introduced, and the language of the Act clarified. The entire Act has subsequently been replaced by the Equality Act 2010.

In Lewisham LBC v Malcolm and EHRC, the House of Lords expressly disapproved the decision (with Baroness Hale dissenting).

== See also ==
- UK employment discrimination law
- UK labour law
- Human Rights Act 1998
