= Disability Discrimination Act 2005 =

Act of the Parliament of the United Kingdom

Disability Discrimination Act 2005 (Note: Section 20(1).)
- Act of Parliament
- Parliament of the United Kingdom
- Long title: An Act to amend the Disability Discrimination Act 1995; and for connected purposes.
- Citation: 2005 c. 13
- Territorial extent: England and Wales; Scotland; (Note: Section 21(7)–(11).)

Dates
- Royal assent: 7 April 2005
- Commencement: various (Note: Section 20(2).)
- Repealed: 1 October 2010
Other legislation
Amends	Disability Discrimination Act 1995
Repealed by	Equality Act 2010 (Consequential Amendments, Saving and Supplementary Provisions) Order 2010

Status: Repealed

Text of statute as originally enacted

Revised text of statute as amended

The Disability Discrimination Act 2005 (c. 13) was an act of the Parliament of the United Kingdom.

== History ==
The Disability Discrimination Act 1995 had been amended before. Service providers such as libraries, banks, shops and restaurants didn't have to adjust their policies, for example by offering documents in accessible formats, until 1999.

== Provisions ==
The act applied the Disability Discrimination Act 1995 to housing, police, local authorities.

The act puts a positive "Disability Equality Duty" in place. This legal duty requires public sector organisations (which include schools and colleges, NHS trusts, libraries, police forces, central and local government) to promote equality positively and proactively by involving people with disabilities, drawing on evidence to create action plans to achieve equality and promoting positive attitudes. All such organisations are required to develop policies and working practices which actively promote the equality of disabled people as employees, consumers or visitors.
