= David Turner-Samuels =

David Jessel Turner-Samuels QC (5 April 1918 –19 November 2016) was a British barrister. He was the son of British Politician Moss Turner-Samuels who was the Labour MP for Gloucester during Clement Attlee's time in office.

Turner-Samuels was educated at Westminster School, and was called to the Bar at Middle Temple. He practiced in the Cloisters chambers with John Platts-Mills, Stephen Sedley and Michael Mansfield.

He died on 19 November 2016 at the age of 98.
