= Rainey v Greater Glasgow Health Board =

- Court: House of Lords
- Citation: [1987] IRLR 26

Keywords
- Discrimination

Rainey v Greater Glasgow Health Board [1987] IRLR 26 is a UK labour law case concerning the justifications for unequal pay.

== Facts ==
Ms Rainey was a prosthetist. Men had been recruited from private practice, to the Board’s new prosthetic fitting service, which had previously been done by private contractors. The men had comparable qualifications and experience. They were paid 40% more. The women were directly recruited on the NHS pay scale. There had been no arrangements to phase out the pay disparities.

== Judgment ==
Lord Keith, overturning Lord Denning in Clay Cross said that ‘material’ meant ‘significant and relevant’ and one should consider all the case’s circumstances, which may well go beyond personal qualities.

In particular, where there is no question of intentional sex discrimination whether direct or indirect (and there is none here) a difference which is connected with economic factors affecting the efficient carrying on of the employer’s business or other activity may well be relevant…’

[Citing Bilka-Kaufhaus...] ‘If the national court finds that the measures chosen by Bilka correspond to a real need on the part of the undertaking, are appropriate with a view to achieving the objectives pursued and are necessary to that end, the fact that the measures affect a far greater number of women than men is not sufficient to show that they constitute an infringement of Article 119’.

‘It was not a question of the appellant being paid less than the norm but of [her comparator] being paid more. He was paid more because of the necessity to attract him and other privately employed prosthetists into forming the nucleus of the new service.’

‘Further, there would not appear to be any material distinction in principle between the need to demonstrate objectively justified grounds of difference for purposes of section 1(3) and the need to justify a requirement or condition under section 1(1)(b)(ii) of the Sex Discrimination Act 1975.

He noted the ECJ would probably not exclude administrative efficiency concerns. He then said that the Whitley Council pay scale had been the natural thing for the NHS women to join. It was an ‘accident’ that the people coming from the private sector were men.

== See also ==
- UK labour law
- UK employment equality law
