= Bilka-Kaufhaus GmbH v Weber von Hartz =

- European Court of Justice
- Full case name: Bilka-Kaufhaus GmbH v Weber von Hartz
- Case: C-170/84
- ECLI: ECLI:EU:C:1986:204
- Language of proceedings: German
- Nationality of parties: German

Court composition
- Advocate General; Marco Darmon

Keywords
- Indirect sex discrimination, pension

Bilka-Kaufhaus GmbH v Weber von Hartz (1986) C-170/84, ECLI:EU:C:1986:204, is an EU labour law case which set out the test for objective justification for indirect discrimination.

== Facts ==
Karin Weber von Hartz was a part-time worker, who had worked for 15 years at Bilka-Kaufhaus. She was refused pension payments under her contract with her employer Bilka-Kaufhaus, which required her to have worked full time for 15 years. She had a German state pension, on top, however. She claimed this was sex discrimination under the Treaty establishing the European Economic Community (TEEC) article 119 (now TFEU art 157). She alleged that women work more part-time, so they are at a disadvantage. Bilka-Kaufhaus argued it was justified in excluding part-time workers because there are higher administrative costs for giving pensions to part-time workers, given the work they do. They also said 81.3 per cent of all occupational pensions were paid to women, even though only 72% of employees were women, so the scheme was unrelated to sex discrimination.

Weber started proceedings are a German Labour Court (German: Arbeitsgericht). The decision was appealed to the Federal Labour Court (German: Bundesarbeitsgericht), which decided to stay proceedings and ask for a preliminary ruling to the European Court of Justice (ECJ).

== Judgment ==
The ECJ considered first whether pension payments were pay and held they were. They then asked whether there was potentially indirect discrimination, held that there could be, but that it was up to the member state court to determine the facts. There could be objective justification if the employer showed the disparate treatment was based on a "real need" of the business. It said the following:

30. if the undertaking is able to show that its pay practice may be explained by objectively justified factors unrelated to any discrimination on grounds of sex there is no breach of article 119...

[...]

36. It is for the national court, which has sole jurisdiction to make findings of fact, to determine whether and to what extent the grounds put forward by an employer to explain the adoption of a pay practice which applies independently of a worker’s sex but in fact affects more women than men may be regarded as objectively justified economic grounds. If the national court finds that the measures chosen by Bilka correspond to a real need on the part of the undertaking, are appropriate with a view to achieving the objectives pursued, and are necessary to that end, the fact that the measures affect a far greater number of women than men is not sufficient to show that they constitute an infringement of article 119.

— Judgement of the Court

== See also ==
- EU law
- UK labour law
