= Collins v Royal National Theatre Board Ltd =

Collins v Royal National Theatre Board Ltd [2004] EWCA Civ 144; [2004] IRLR 395 is a case under the Disability Discrimination Act 1995. It concerns the duty of an employer to make reasonable accommodations for a disabled employee.

== Facts ==
Mr Collins lost part of his finger in an accident at the Royal National Theatre’s carpentry shop, making his hand clumsy. He had worked there 18 years. He refused surgery and was dismissed.

== Judgment ==
Sedley LJ held that there was a failure on the Theatre's part to make reasonable adjustments.

On a technical point, he held that reasons why the employer had not made any effort to adjust the workplace for the employee could not be brought up in argument if they had already been dismissed when looking at whether there was a duty to make reasonable adjustments in the first place.

== See also ==
- UK employment discrimination law
- UK labour law
- Human Rights Act 1998
