= Disability Discrimination Act 1995 =

Act of the Parliament of the United Kingdom

Disability Discrimination Act 1995 (Note: Section 70(1).)
- Act of Parliament
- Parliament of the United Kingdom
- Long title: An Act to make it unlawful to discriminate against disabled persons in connection with employment, the provision of goods, facilities and services or the disposal or management of premises; to make provision about the employment of disabled persons; and to establish a National Disability Council
- Citation: 1995 c. 50
- Territorial extent: England and Wales, Scotland and Northern Ireland Act now only applies to Northern Ireland (Note: Section 70(5)–(6).)

Dates
- Royal assent: 8 November 1995
- Commencement: various (Note: Section 70(2)–(3).)
- Repealed: England and Wales; Scotland: 1 October 2010
Other legislation
Amends	Further and Higher Education Act 1992
Amended by	Employment Tribunals Act 1996; Employment Rights Act 1996; Education Act 1996; Employment Relations Act 1999; Mental Capacity Act 2005; Disability Discrimination Act 2005
Repealed by	England and Wales and Scotland: Equality Act 2010

Status: Partially repealed

Text of statute as originally enacted

Revised text of statute as amended

Text of the Disability Discrimination Act 1995 as in force today (including any amendments) within the United Kingdom, from legislation.gov.uk.

The Disability Discrimination Act 1995 (c. 50) (informally, and hereafter, the DDA) is an act of the Parliament of the United Kingdom which has now been repealed and replaced by the Equality Act 2010, except in Northern Ireland where the act still applies. Formerly, it made it unlawful to discriminate against people in respect of their disabilities in relation to employment, the provision of goods and services, education and transport.

The DDA is a civil rights law. Other countries use constitutional, social rights or criminal law to make similar provisions. The Equality and Human Rights Commission combats discrimination. Equivalent legislation exists in Northern Ireland, which is enforced by the Northern Ireland Equality Commission.

== History ==
The act was the culmination of a public campaign, and at least 100,000 people in demonstrations, to force the government to end state and business discrimination against disabled people. While the Race Relations Act 1976 and the Sex Discrimination Act 1975 guaranteed minimum standards for equality on grounds of race and gender, there had been very little concerning disabled people.

In 1890 the British Deaf Association was founded, and in 1899 the National League of the Blind and Disabled was established as a trade union.

Prior to the DDA, the first attempt to deal with the issue of disability was the Disabled Persons (Employment) Act 1944. This made it a legal requirement for companies with over 250 employees to employ a quota of disabled persons. This failed as there was not now anyone appointed to monitor these rights and as such was toothless.

== Service providers ==
The Act placed duties on service providers and required "reasonable adjustments" to be made when providing access to goods, facilities, services and premises. These were introduced in three stages:

- Since 2 December 1994, it has been unlawful for service providers to treat disabled people less favourably for a reason related to their disability;
- Since 1 October 2002, service providers have had to make 'reasonable adjustments' for disabled people, such as providing extra help or making changes to the way they provide their services.
- Since 1 October 2004, service providers may have to make other 'reasonable adjustments' in relation to the physical features of their premises to overcome physical barriers to access.

== Amending legislation ==
The Act was amended by the following legislation in Great Britain (but not Northern Ireland, where different amendments apply):

- The Disability Rights Commission Act 1999, which replaced the National Disability Council with the Disability Rights Commission (DRC);
- The Special Educational Needs and Disability Act 2001 inserted new provisions in Part 4 of the DDA 1995 in connection with disability discrimination in schools and other educational establishments;
- The Private Hire Vehicles (Carriage of Guide Dogs etc.) Act 2002, which prevented operators of such vehicles refusing to take assistance dogs, or making additional charges for such dogs.
- The Disability Discrimination Act 1995 (Amendment) Regulations 2003, and the Disability Discrimination Act 1995 (Pensions) Regulations 2003 which amended the DDA in line with the EU employment directive.
- The Disability Discrimination Act 2005, which completed the implementation of the Disability Rights Task Force recommendations, including the extension of the DDA 1995 to cover public transport, and the introduction of a duty on public authorities to promote equality for disabled people.
- The Equality Act 2006 which transferred the role of the Disability Rights Commission to the Equality and Human Rights Commission (EHRC). The EHRC took on this role from 1 October 2007, and has powers to issue guidance on and enforce all the equality enactments (covering race, sex, disability, religion and belief, sexual orientation and age).

== Principles ==
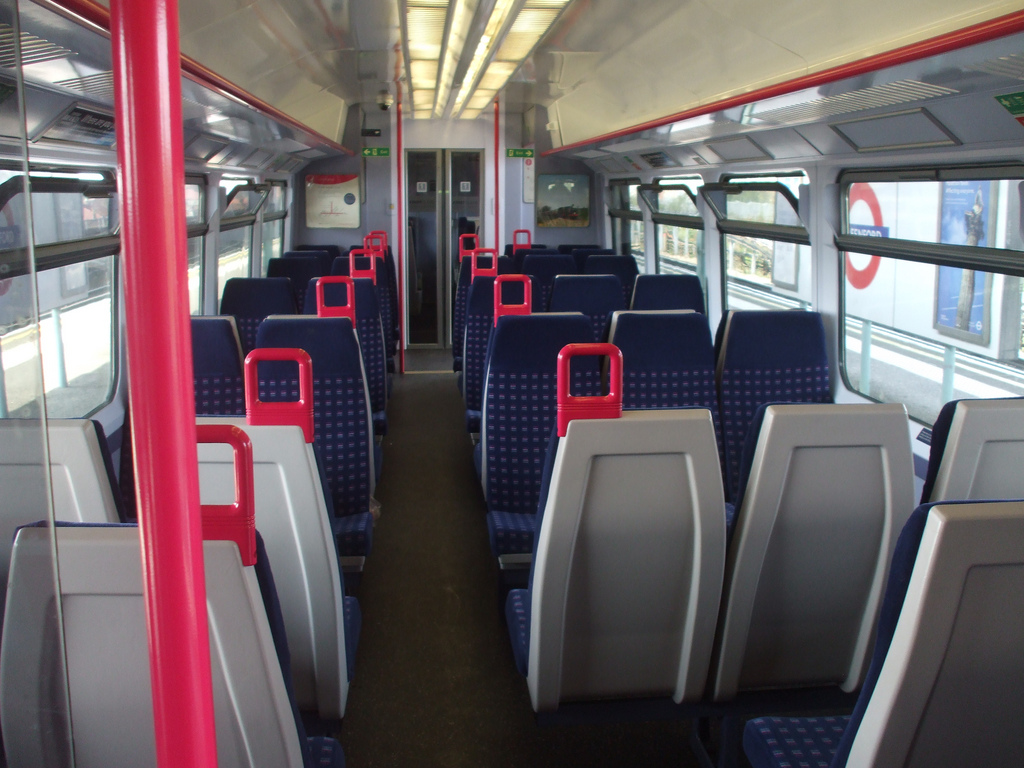
The poles and grab handles on this Class 165 train are of a contrasting colour to assist visually impaired passengers. This is a reasonable adjustment in respect of the DDA.

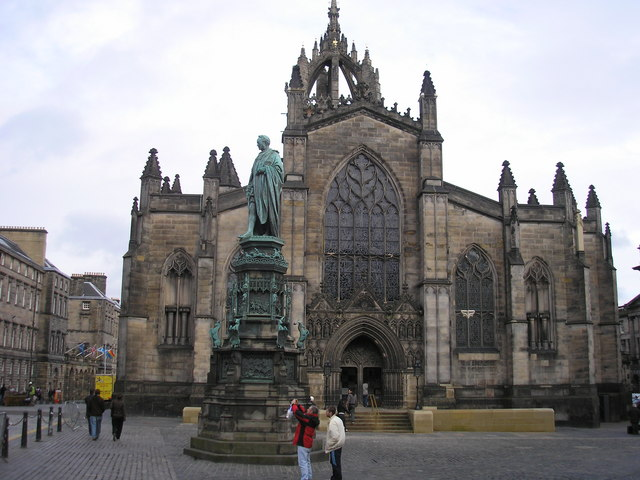
At St Giles' Cathedral in Edinburgh; the ramp to the right of the stairs was added to comply with the DDA.

The DDA 1995 departed from the fundamental principles of older UK discrimination law (the Sex Discrimination Act 1975 and the Race Relations Act 1976). These Acts, also repealed and replaced by the Equality Act 2010, made direct discrimination and indirect discrimination unlawful. However, these concepts are insufficient to deal with the issues of disability discrimination.

The core concepts in the DDA 1995 are, instead:

- less favourable treatment for a reason related to a disabled person's disability; and
- failure to make a "reasonable adjustment".

"Reasonable adjustment" or, as it is known in some other jurisdictions, 'reasonable accommodation', is the radical concept that makes the DDA 1995 so different from the older legislation. Instead of the rather passive approach of indirect discrimination (where someone can take action if they have been disadvantaged by a policy, practice or criterion that a body with duties under the law has adopted), reasonable adjustment is an active approach that requires employers, service providers etc. to take steps to remove barriers from disabled people's participation. For example:

- employers are likely to find it reasonable to provide accessible IT equipment;
- many shops are likely to find it reasonable to make their premises accessible to wheelchair users;
- councils are likely to find it reasonable to provide information in alternative formats (such as large print) as well as normal written form.

The Disability Rights Commission's Codes of Practice give more information to bodies with duties on assessing whether a particular adjustment is reasonable. In general, the factors to consider would include:

- whether the proposed adjustment would meet the needs of the disabled person;
- whether the adjustment is affordable;
- whether the adjustment would have a serious effect on other people.

Sometimes there may be no reasonable adjustment, and the outcome is that a disabled person is treated less favourably. For example, if a person was not able to understand the implications of entering into a mortgage or loan agreement, and they did not have anyone authorised to act for them, it would not make sense to require a bank or building society to enter into that agreement. The Act therefore permits employers and service providers to justify less favourable treatment (and in some instances failure to make a reasonable adjustment) in certain circumstances.

An example would be a medieval castle open for public tours that didn't have modifications made for wheelchairs. To do so would destroy the castle's historical aspects such as the restrictive nature of the original circular staircases.

== Housing ==
The system of protection of disabled people, especially those with mental health problems to keep their homes, has been greatly enhanced by certain recent rulings in the UK Court of Appeal—City of Manchester v Romano.

Under the act it is unlawful to discriminate against a disabled person by evicting them or subjecting them to other detriment unless justified under the limited number of justifications set out in the act.

In practice the only relevant justification is that the landlord believes and also that it is objectively necessary for the protection of the health or safety of the disabled person or someone else.

Where the cause of the taking of proceedings is e.g. rent arrears which was caused by the disability e.g. by Housing Benefit being cancelled through non response to correspondence and the non response was caused by the disability, then not only is it discrimination, but it is discrimination which cannot be justified on the grounds allowed in the act.

This applies whether or not the landlord knew of the disability.

This applies even if

the landlord has a mandatory ground for possession, e.g.

two months rent arrears or
two months notice no reason in cases of assured shorthold tenancy where the actual reason is rent arrears

the tenancy is one where there is no statutory system of protection, e.g.

where in LA temporary accommodation under the homelessness duty
the tenancy is a business tenancy

The tenant may counter-claim and seek an injunction restraining the landlord from continuing the possession proceedings.

The judges were very worried about the extent of the law and urged Parliament to change it. However, there has since been a new act of Parliament and there was no weakening of this protection.

== Cases ==
- Coleman v Attridge Law AG Maduro' opinion and judgment (C‑303/06) [2007] IRLR 88
- Paul v National Probation Service [2004] IRLR 190, [2003] UKEAT 0290_03_1311
- Chacon Navas v Eurest Colectividades SA (2007) All ER (EC) 59 (C-13/05)
- Goodwin v Patent Office [1999] ICR 302, on a person with paranoid schizophrenia
- Vicary v British Telecommunications plc [1999] IRLR 680, per Morison J
- Leonard v Southern Derbyshire Chamber of Commerce [2001] IRLR 19
- Clark v TDG Ltd (t/a Novacold Ltd) [1999] IRLR 318
- Jones v Post Office [2001] IRLR 384
- Collins v Royal National Theatre Board Ltd [2004] IRLR 395
- Archibald v Fife Council [2004] UKHL 32

== See also ==
- UK labour law
- Disability discrimination act – general definition, and list of acts by country
- Disability rights movement Disability rights activism
- Easy Access on public transport, etc.
- Persons with reduced mobility
