= United Kingdom labour law =

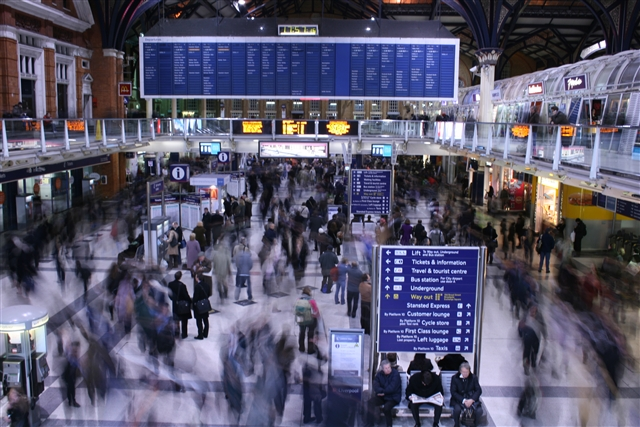
In the UK in 2026, of the total working population 30.3 million people were employed, there was 4.9% unemployment, and 6.6 million trade union members. The median full-time income was £39,093 (2025) with an average working week of 37 hours.

United Kingdom labour law regulates the relations between workers, employers and trade unions. People at work in the UK have a minimum set of employment rights, from Acts of Parliament, Regulations, common law and equity. This includes the right to a minimum wage of £12.71 for over-21-year-olds from April 2026 under the National Minimum Wage Act 1998. The Working Time Regulations 1998 give the right to 28 days paid holidays, breaks from work, and attempt to limit long working hours. The Employment Rights Act 1996 gives the right to leave for child care, and the right to request flexible working patterns. The Pensions Act 2008 gives the right to be automatically enrolled in a basic occupational pension, whose funds must be protected according to the Pensions Act 1995. Workers must be able to vote for trustees of their occupational pensions under the Pensions Act 2004. In some enterprises, such as universities or NHS foundation trusts, staff can vote for the directors of the organisation. In enterprises with over 50 staff, workers must be negotiated with, with a view to agreement on any contract or workplace organisation changes, major economic developments or difficulties. The UK Corporate Governance Code recommends worker involvement in voting for a listed company's board of directors but does not yet follow international standards in protecting the right to vote in law. Collective bargaining, between democratically organised trade unions and the enterprise's management, has been seen as a "single channel" for individual workers to counteract the employer's abuse of power when it dismisses staff or fix the terms of work. Collective agreements are ultimately backed up by a trade union's right to strike: a fundamental requirement of democratic society in international law. Under the Trade Union and Labour Relations (Consolidation) Act 1992 strike action is protected when it is "in contemplation or furtherance of a trade dispute".

As well as the law's aim for fair treatment, the Equality Act 2010 requires that people are treated equally, unless there is a good justification, based on their sex, race, sexual orientation, religion or belief and age. To combat social exclusion, employers must positively accommodate the needs of disabled people. Part-time staff, agency workers, and people on fixed-term contracts must be treated equally compared to full-time, direct and permanent staff. To tackle unemployment, all employees are entitled to reasonable notice before dismissal after a qualifying period of a month, and in principle can only be dismissed for a fair reason. Employees are also entitled to a redundancy payment if their job was no longer economically necessary. If an enterprise is bought or outsourced, the Transfer of Undertakings (Protection of Employment) Regulations 2006 require that employees' terms cannot be worsened without a good economic, technical or organisational reason. The purpose of these rights is to ensure people have dignified living standards, whether or not they have the relative bargaining power to get good terms and conditions in their contract. Regulations relating to external shift hours communication with employees will be introduced by the government, with official sources stating that it should boost production at large.

== History ==
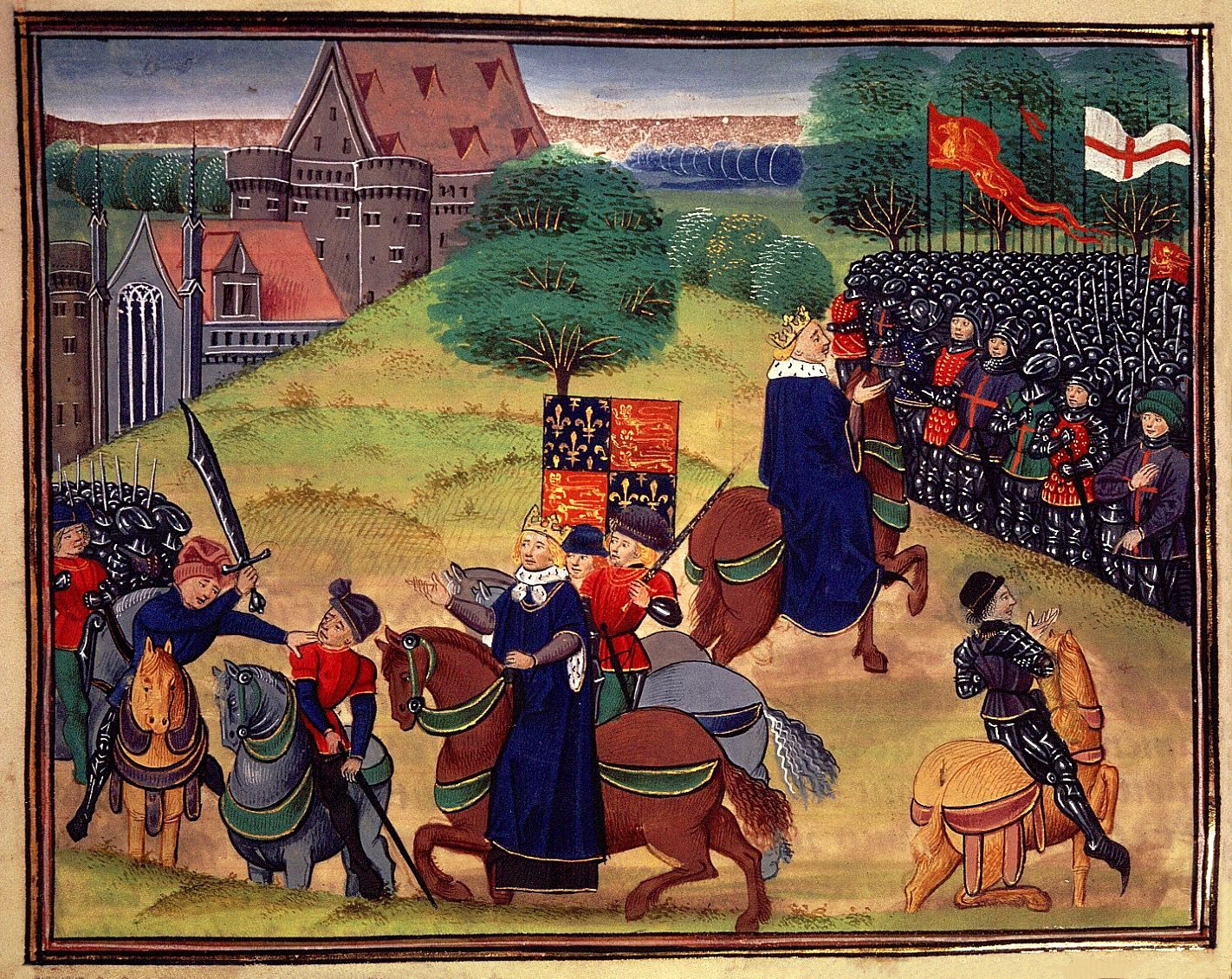
Wat Tyler, leader of the Peasants' Revolt is killed in front of King Richard II.

Modern labour law is mostly a creation of the last three decades of the 20th century. However, as a system of regulating the employment relationship, labour law has existed since people worked. In feudal England, after the Black Death with a shortage of workers and consequent price rises, the Ordinance of Labourers 1349 and the Statute of Labourers 1351 suppressed wages to pre-plague levels, banned workers unionising, and created offences for any able-bodied person that did not work. Ultimately this led to the Peasants' Revolt of 1381, which was followed by the Statute of Cambridge 1388, banning workers moving around the country. All these repressive acts were signs that serfdom was breaking down. The more enlightened Truck Acts, dating from 1464, required that workers be paid in cash and not kind. In 1772 slavery was declared to be illegal in R v Knowles, ex parte Somersett, and the subsequent Slave Trade Act 1807 and Slavery Abolition Act 1833 enforced prohibition throughout the British Empire. In the 19th century, production boomed. Gradually people's relationship to their employers moved from one of status - formal subordination and deference - to "freedom of contract" in choosing where to work. However, freedom of contract did not, as the economist Adam Smith observed, change a worker's factual dependency on employers and the threat of poverty from unemployment.

"It is not, however, difficult to foresee which of the two parties must, upon all ordinary occasions, have the advantage in the dispute, and force the other into a compliance with their terms. The masters, being fewer in number, can combine much more easily; and the law, besides, authorises, or at least does not prohibit their combinations, while it prohibits those of the workmen. We have no acts of parliament against combining to lower the price of work; but many against combining to raise it. In all such disputes the masters can hold out much longer. A landlord, a farmer, a master manufacturer, a merchant, though they did not employ a single workman, could generally live a year or two upon the stocks which they have already acquired. Many workmen could not subsist a week, few could subsist a month, and scarce any a year without employment. In the long run the workman may be as necessary to his master as his master is to him; but the necessity is not so immediate."

— A Smith, An Inquiry into the Nature and Causes of the Wealth of Nations (1776) Book I, ch 8, §12

At the Industrial Revolution's height, the British Empire organised half the world's production, on a third of the globe's surface, with a quarter of its population. Joint Stock Companies, building railways, canals and factories, manufacturing household goods, connecting telegraphs, distributing coal, formed the backbone of commerce, yet with miserable factory life. The Factory Acts dating from 1803 required minimum standards on hours and conditions of working children. Trade unions were suppressed, especially after the French Revolution of 1789, in the Combination Act 1799. The Master and Servant Act 1823 criminalised workers for disobedience, strikes were branded as an "aggravated" breach of contract. Despite this, unions grew and through massive pressure won the right to exist and bargain in the Trade Union Act 1871 and the Conspiracy, and Protection of Property Act 1875. Toward the turn of the 20th century, in Mogul Steamship Co Ltd v McGregor, Gow & Co, the House of Lords emphasised that businesses should be free to organise into trade associations in the same way that employees organised into unions. However, in the notorious judgment of Taff Vale Railway Co v Amalgamated Society of Railway Servants, the House of Lords changed its mind and made unions liable in economic tort for the costs of industrial action. Although a combination of employers in a company could dismiss employees without notice, a combination of employees in a trade union were punished for withdrawing their labour. The case led trade unions to form a Labour Representation Committee, which then became the Labour Party, to lobby for the reversal of the law. After their landslide victory in the 1906 general election, the Trade Disputes Act 1906 enshrined the essential principle of collective labour law that any strike "in contemplation or furtherance of a trade dispute" is immune from civil law sanctions. The Old Age Pensions Act 1908 provided pensions for retirees. The Trade Boards Act 1909 created the first minimum wages and the National Insurance Act 1911 levied a fee to insure people got benefits in the event of unemployment.

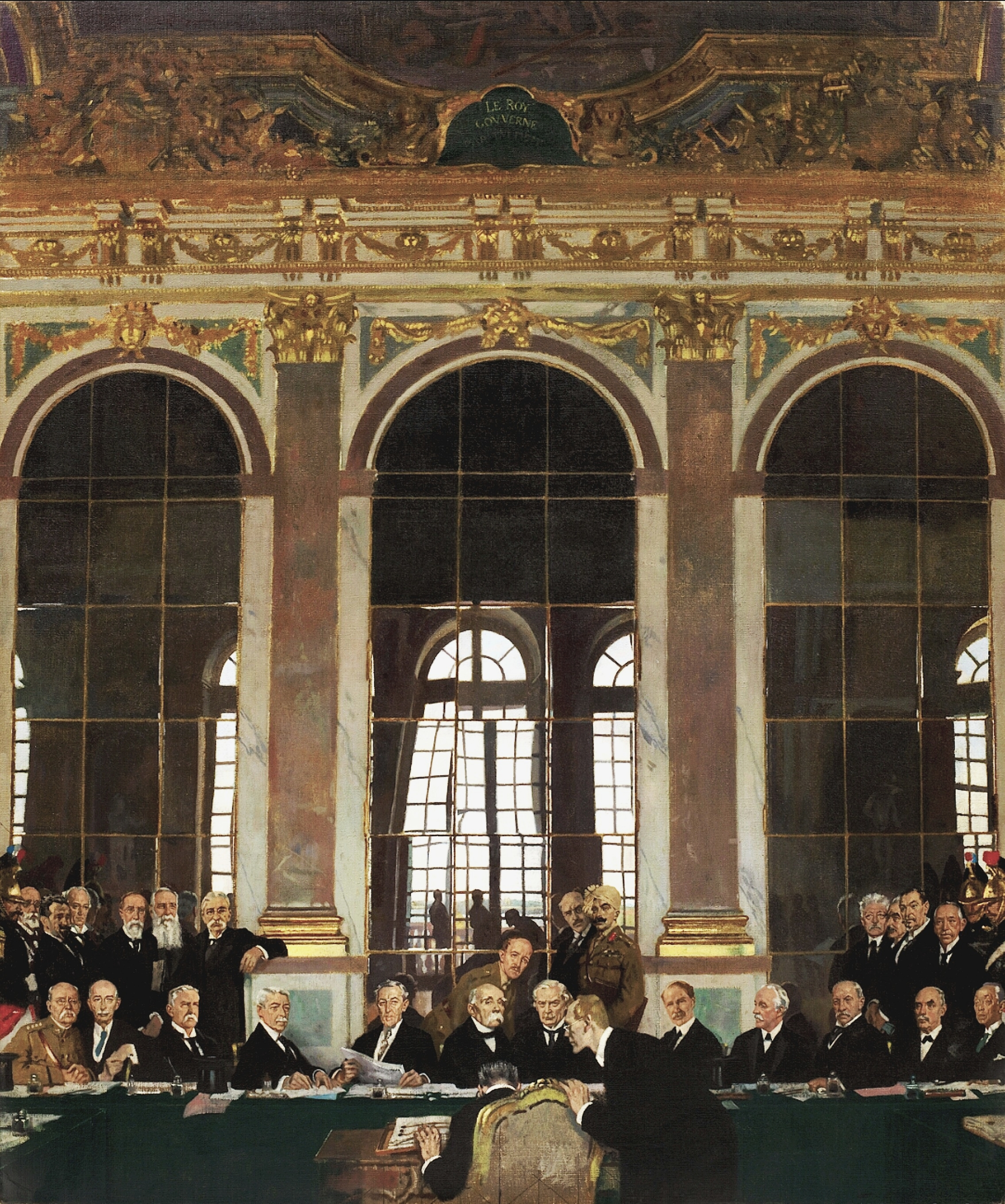
The International Labour Organization was created by the Versailles Treaty in 1919, on the principle that "peace can be established only if it is based on social justice".

After the brutality of World War I, the Versailles Treaty created the International Labour Organization to draw up common standards between countries, for as it said, "peace can be established only if it is based on social justice", and echoed the US Clayton Act 1914 in pronouncing that "labour should not be regarded merely as a commodity or an article of commerce". But the international system remained disjointed as the United States Congress withheld its approval to join the League of Nations. Within the UK the postwar settlement was to make a home fit for heroes. Whitley Councils extended the Trade Boards Act 1909 system to Joint Industrial Councils that created sector-wide fair wage agreements, while the Ministry of Labour actively organised the growth of trade unions. This was based on a theory of collective bargaining, agreement or action, advocated by Sidney Webb and Beatrice Webb in Industrial Democracy to remedy the inequality of bargaining power of workers. Without legal force behind collective agreements, the law remained in a state of collective laissez faire, encouraging voluntarism for agreement and dispute settlement between industrial partners. The 1920s and 1930s were economically volatile. In 1926 a General Strike against coal miners' pay cuts paralysed the country, and though it was broken, the Labour Party formed its first government in Parliament in 1929. The onset of the Great Depression, and then war, meant little was achieved.

After the Second World War, under the first majority Labour government of Clement Attlee which promised to "win the peace", collective agreements covered over 80 per cent of the workforce. As the British Empire dissolved, migration from Commonwealth countries, and record levels of female workplace participation, changed Britain's workforce. While the common law was sometimes progressive, but mostly not, the first statutes prohibiting discrimination based on gender and race emerged in the 1960s, after the Civil Rights Act was passed in the United States. Discrimination in employment (as in consumer or public service access) was formally prohibited on grounds of race in 1965, gender in 1975, disability in 1995, sexual orientation and religion in 2003 and age in 2006. A complicated and inconsistent jamboree of Acts and statutory instruments was placed into a comprehensive code in the Equality Act 2010. This was backed by European Union law, which the UK acceded to with the European Communities Act 1972. Although labour laws in the early European Treaties were minimal, the Social Chapter of the Maastricht Treaty brought employment rights squarely into EU law. Meanwhile, starting from the Contracts of Employment Act 1963, workers gained a growing list of minimum statutory rights, such as the right to reasonable notice before a fair dismissal and a redundancy payment. Labour governments through the 1960s and 1970s were troubled by reform of the unwieldy trade union system. Despite producing reports such as In Place of Strife and the Report of the committee of inquiry on industrial democracy which would have codified union governance, and created more direct workplace participation, reform did not take place.

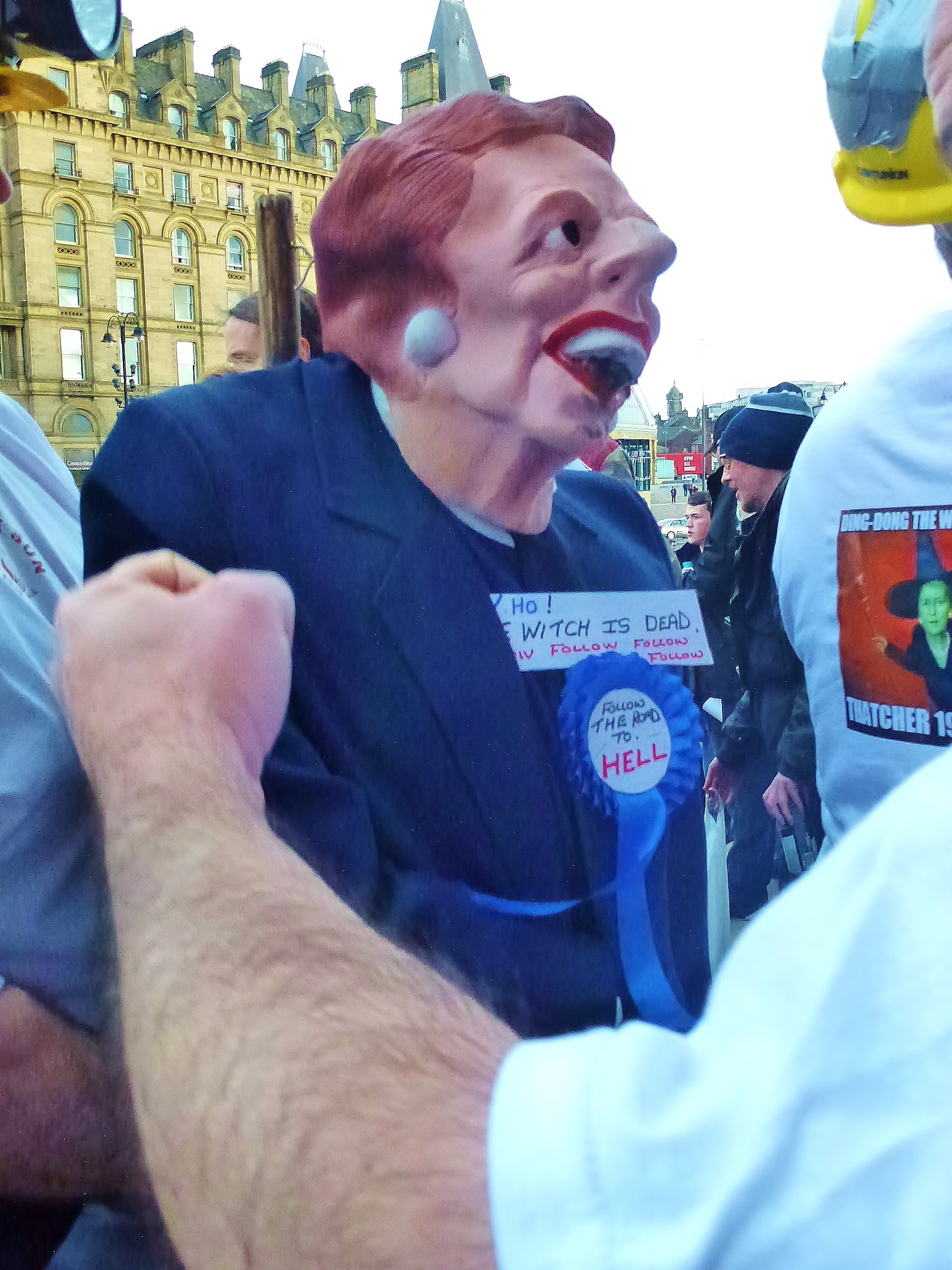
The 1984–1985 United Kingdom miners' strike was a confrontation between the Thatcher government and coal mine workers, which has left resentment till today.

From 1979, a new Conservative government began dismantling most labour rights. During the 1980s ten major Acts gradually reduced the autonomy of trade unions and the legality of industrial action. Reforms to the internal structure of unions mandated that representatives be elected and a ballot is taken before a strike, that no worker could strike in sympathetic secondary action with workers with a different employer, and that employers could not run a closed shop system of requiring all workers to join the recognised union. The wage councils were dismantled. A public campaign against the merits of unions paralleled the decline of membership and collective agreement coverage to under 40 per cent. In addition, the government opted out of the EU Social Chapter in the Maastricht Treaty. In 1997 the new Labour government brought the UK into the EU's Social Chapter, which has served as the source for most reform in UK law since that time. Domestic led reform was minimal. The National Minimum Wage Act 1998 established a country-wide minimum wage, but did not attempt to reinvigorate the Wage Board system. The Employment Relations Act 1999 introduced a 60-page procedure requiring employers to compulsorily recognise and bargain with a union holding support among workers, though union membership remained at a level steadily declining below 30 per cent. Most advances in labour rights since 1997 came through EU law, such as paid holidays, information and consultation, or spreading equality. Since 2010, the Conservative-led government continued a programme of labour rights by requiring people who take zero hour contracts to get unemployment insurance, and increasing the turnout requirements for industrial action ballots in the Trade Union Act 2016.

== Employment rights and duties ==
UK labour law's main concerns are to ensure that every working person has a minimum charter of rights in their workplace, and voice at work to get fair standards beyond the minimum. It distinguishes self-employed people, who are free to contract for any terms they wish, and employees, whose employers are responsible for complying with labour laws. UK courts and statutes also, however, give more or fewer rights to different groups including "worker", "jobholder", "apprentice" or someone with an "employment relation". A "worker", for example, is entitled to a minimum wage (£11.44 per hour in 2024), 28 statutory minimum days of paid holiday, enrolment in a pension plan, a safe system of work, and the right to equal treatment that also applies to consumers and public service users. An "employee" has all those rights, and also the right to a written contract of employment, time off for pregnancy or child care, reasonable notice before a fair dismissal and a redundancy payment, and the duty to contribute to the National Insurance fund and pay income tax. The scope of the terms "worker", "employee", and others, are more or less left to the courts to construe according to the context of its use in a statute, but someone is essentially entitled to more rights if they are in a weaker position and thus lack bargaining power. English courts view an employment contract as involving a relation of mutual trust and confidence, which allows them to develop and enlarge the remedies available for workers and employers alike when one side acts out of bad faith.

=== Scope of protection ===
The UK has not yet codified a single definition of who is protected by labour rights. The law has two main definitions (employee and worker) and three minor definitions (jobholder, apprentice, and an "employment relation") each with different rights. EU law does have one consolidated definition of a 'worker': someone who has a contract for work in return for a wage, or an indirect quid pro quo (as in a communal cooperative), and also stands as the more vulnerable party to the contract. This reflects the kernel of classical labour law theory, that an employment contract is one infused with "inequality of bargaining power", and stands as a justification for mandating additional terms to what might otherwise be agreed under a system of total freedom of contract.

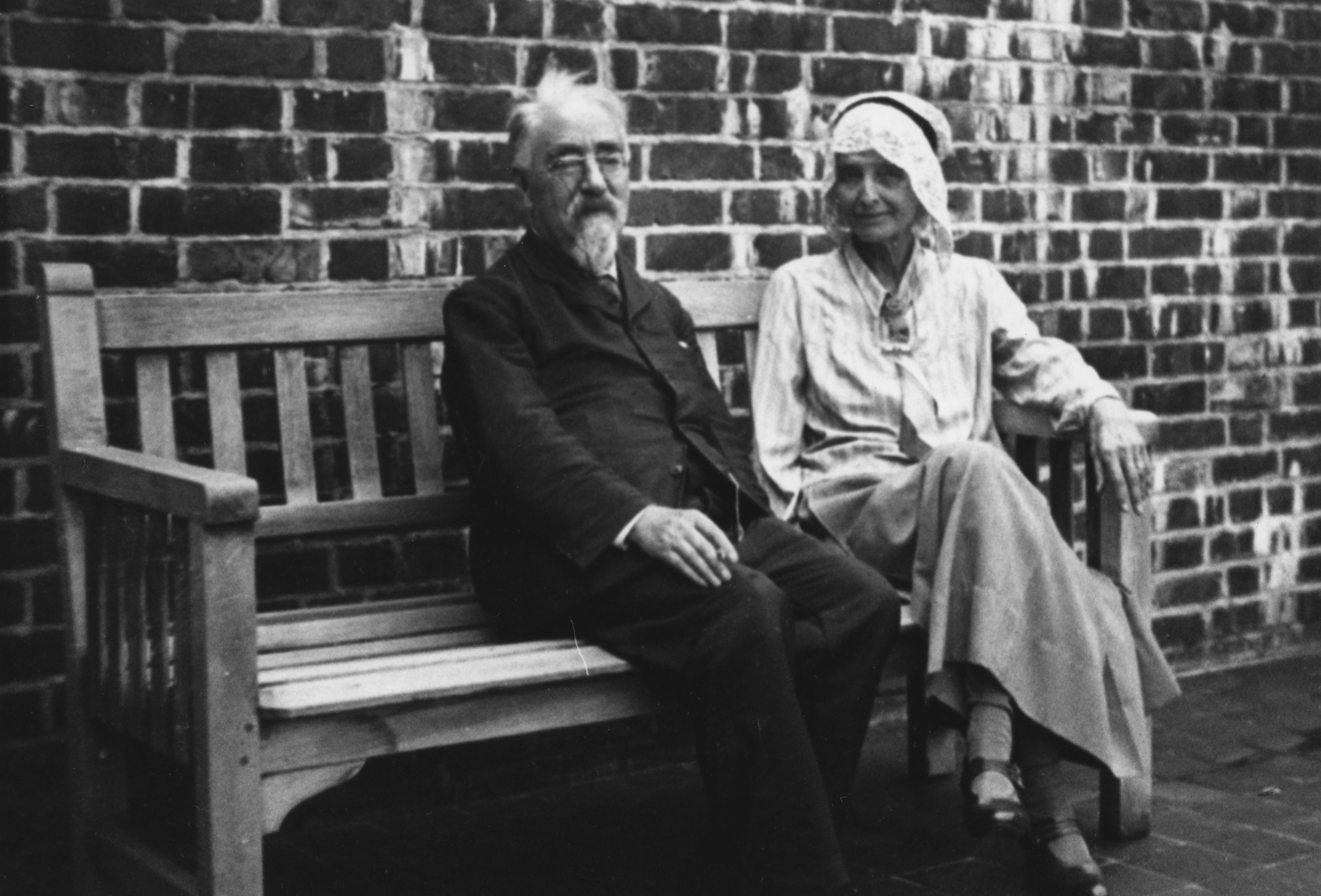
Sidney and Beatrice Webb, in their book Industrial Democracy argued that because workers' inequality of bargaining power meant they could not contract for it themselves, law should create a "national minimum" of workplace rights, with trade unions to secure a living wage.

First, an "employee" has all main rights, including job security, retirement, child care, and the right to equal treatment. Most people are employees, although this has not yet been fully defined in the Employment Rights Act 1996 section 230. Instead, Parliament left it to the courts to decide what "employee" with a "contract of service" meant, although the government can explicitly put people into the "employee" category. The classical common law test was that an employee was subject to the employer's 'control'. But in the 20th century, more people worked outside factories where they had greater autonomy in performing their jobs. New tests were used, such as whether an employee was "integrated" into the workplace, or wore the "badge" of the organisation. Most importantly, because employers paid National Insurance contributions for their employees, the tax authorities had a central role in enforcing the proper distinction. Courts focused on "economic reality", and substance over form. It could also be relevant (but not decisive) if employees owned their tools, if they had the chance of profit, or bore the risk of loss. But in the late 1970s and 1980s, some courts introduced a new test of "mutuality of obligation". The dominant view of this, now approved by the UK Supreme Court, was merely that employees only needed to exchange work for a wage: this was the "irreducible core" of an employment contract. But a rival view stated that the employment relationship had to be one where there was an ongoing obligation to offer and accept work. This led to cases where employers, who hired people on a casual basis, low wages, and with little bargaining power, argued they owed no duties to their staff, because they had neither side had assumed any such obligation. However, the leading case, Autoclenz Ltd v Belcher decided by a unanimous Supreme Court in 2011, adopted the view that mutuality of obligation is the consideration of work for a wage. Lord Clarke held that an exchange of work for a wage was essential, but that employment contracts could not be treated like commercial agreements. As he put it,

the relative bargaining power of the parties must be taken into account in deciding whether the terms of any written agreement in truth represent what was agreed and the true agreement will often have to be gleaned from all the circumstances of the case, of which the written agreement is only a part. This may be described as a purposive approach to the problem. If so, I am content with that description.

This meant that a group of car valeters, although their contracts said they were self-employed, and professed to have no obligation to undertake work, were entitled to a minimum wage and paid leave. The contract terms could be disregarded because they did not represent the reality of the situation. The second major category is of a 'worker'. This is defined in Employment Rights Act 1996 section 230 as someone with a contract of employment or someone who personally performs work and is not a client or a customer. This means all employees are workers, but not all workers are employees. Non-employee workers are entitled to a safe system of work, a minimum wage and limits on working time, anti-discrimination rights, and trade union rights, but not job security, child care, and employers do not make National Insurance contributions for them. The Supreme Court has held that this category contains quasi-self-employed professionals, such as partners of a law firm, and high-earning plumbers. However, staff who are employed through an agency, will be employees in relation to the agency. Though not entitled to employee rights, these workers may form trade unions and take collective action under UK, EU and international law, to protect their interests.

=== Contract of employment ===
Once a person's work contract is categorised, the courts have specific rules to decide, beyond the statutory minimum charter of rights, what are its terms and conditions. Just like ordinary contract law there are rules on incorporation, implied terms and unjust factors. However, in Gisda Cyf v Barratt, Lord Kerr emphasised that if it affects statutory rights, the way courts construe a contract must be "intellectually segregated" from the general law of contract, because of the employee's relation of dependency. In this case, Ms Barratt was told her employment was terminated in a letter that she opened 3 days after its arrival. She claimed her dismissal was unfair within three months (the time limit to bring claims in Tribunals) after reading the letter, but the employer argued it was barred because in commercial contract cases, one is bound by a notice as soon as it arrives in business hours. The Supreme Court held that Ms Barratt could claim: she was only bound by the notice when she actually read it. The purpose of employment law to protect the employee, and so the rules must be construed to uphold employees' rights.

Everything an employee is promised or agrees to becomes a term of the contract, so long as this does not contradict statutory labour rights. In addition, terms can be incorporated by reasonable notice, for instance by referring to a staff handbook in a written employment agreement, or even in a document in a filing cabinet next to the staff handbook. While without express wording they are presumed not binding between the union and employer, a collective agreement may give rise to individual rights. The test applied by the courts is to ask loosely whether its terms are 'apt' for incorporation, and not statements of 'policy' or 'aspiration'. Where the collective agreement's words are clear, a "last in, first out" rule was held in one case to potentially qualify, but in another case a clause purporting to censure compulsory redundancies was held to be binding 'in honour' only.

As well as statutory rights, expressly agreed terms, and incorporated terms, the employment relation contains standardised implied terms, on top of the individualised implied terms that courts always construe to reflect the reasonable expectations of the parties. First, the courts have long held that employees are owed additional and beneficial obligations, such as a safe system of work, and payment of wages even when the employer has no work to offer. The House of Lords held employers have a duty to inform their employees of their workplace pension rights, although a lower court stopped short of requiring employers to give advice on qualifying for workplace disability benefits. The key implied term is the duty of good faith, or "mutual trust and confidence". This is applied in many circumstances. Examples include requiring that employers do not act in an authoritarian manner, do not call employees names behind their back, do not treat workers unequally when upgrading pay, do not run the company as a front for international crime, or do not exercise discretion to award a bonus capriciously. There has been disagreement among judges about the extent to which the core implied term of mutual trust and confidence can be 'contracted out of', with the House of Lords having held that the parties may when they are "free" to do so, while others approach the question as a matter of construction of the agreement which is within exclusive judicial competence to define.

The second, and older, hallmark of the employment contract is that employees are bound to follow their employers' instructions while at work, so long as that does not contravene statute or agreed terms. Employments relation give the employer discretion in limited fields. This used to be called the 'master–servant' relationship. The employer has some ability to vary the way work is done in accordance with business needs, so long as it does not contradict a contract's express terms, which always require an employee's consent, or a collective agreement. The status of 'flexibility clauses', purporting to allow employers the discretion to vary any contract term, has been contested, as it will often enable abuse of power that the common law controls. The limits of the courts' tolerance for such practices are evident if they touch procedures for accessing justice, or potentially if they would contravene the duty of mutual trust and confidence.

=== Wages and tax ===
Since 1998, the United Kingdom has fixed a national minimum wage, but collective bargaining is the main mechanism to achieve "a fair day's wage for a fair day's work". The Truck Acts were the earliest wage regulations, requiring workmen to be paid in money, and not kind. Today, the Employment Rights Act 1996 section 13 stipulates that employers can only dock employees' wages (e.g. for destroying stock) if the employee has consented to deductions in writing. This, however, does not cover industrial action, so following 18th century common law on part performance of work, employees who refused to 3 out of 37 hours a week in minor workplace disobedience had their pay cut for the full 37. From the Trade Boards Act 1909, the UK had set minimum wages according to the specific needs of different sectors of work. This eroded from 1986, and then repealed in 1993. One wages council that survived was the Agricultural Wages Board, established under the Agricultural Wages Act 1948. It was abolished in England in October 2013, though boards still operate for Scotland, Northern Ireland, and Wales.

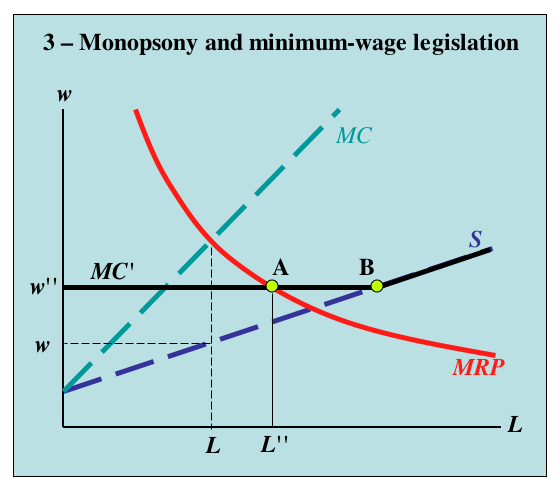
Modern economic theory suggests a reasonable minimum wage will raise productivity, equality and employment because labour markets are persistently monopsonistic, and people on lower incomes spend more money, stimulating effective aggregate demand for goods and services.

To bring the UK back into compliance with international law, the National Minimum Wage Act 1998 was introduced. Every worker" who personally performs work, but not for a client or customer, However, it was held that a pupil barrister did not count as a worker. The minimum wage rate is revised annually after guidance from the Low Pay Commission, but since 2010 has been cut for under-25-year-olds and young people doing apprenticeships. The National Minimum Wage Regulations 2015 state that for people who are not paid by the hour, total pay is divided by the hours actually worked over an average "pay reference period" of one month. Workers who are "on call" have to be paid when they are on call. But if a worker is given sleeping facilities and is not awake, the minimum wage need not be paid. However, an employer may agree with a worker what the hours worked actually are, if hours are ordinarily unmeasured. In Walton v Independent Living Organisation Ltd a worker who cared for a young epileptic lady had to be on call 24 hours a day, 3 days a week, but could do her own activities, such as going shopping, making meals and cleaning. Her company made an agreement with her that her tasks took 6 hours and 50 minutes a day, which resulted in her £31.40 allowance meeting the minimum wage. Deductions up to £6 per day can be made for accommodation the employer provides, though extra bills, such as for electricity, should not ordinarily be charged. The minimum wage can be enforced individually through an Employment Rights Act 1996 section 13 claim for a shortfall of wages in a Tribunal. A worker may not be subjected to any detriment for requesting records or complaining about it. However, because many workers will not be informed about how to do this, or have the resources, a primary enforcement mechanism is through inspections and compliance notices issued by Her Majesty's Revenue and Customs (HMRC). A remedy of up to 80 times the minimum wage is available to the worker and HMRC can enforce a penalty of twice the minimum wage per worker per day.

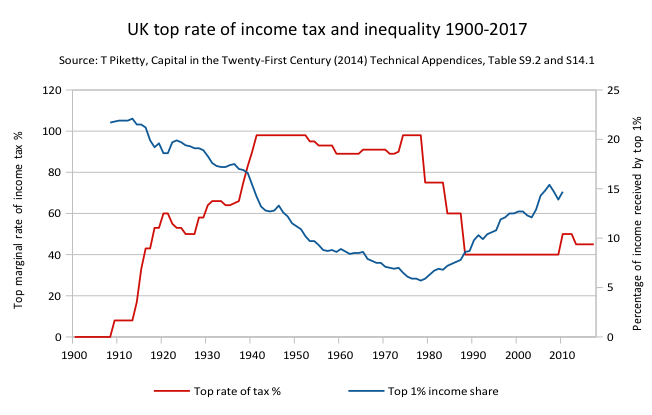
The top rate of income tax was 80% to 100% from 1940 to 1980. As it fell, income inequality has risen in the UK.

Unlike the rules for Value Added Tax Act 1994, where consumers must see the prices they actually pay after tax, there is currently no requirement for workers to see the final wages they will actually earn after income tax, and National Insurance contributions. Under the Income Tax Act 2007, as amended each year by the Finance Acts, in 2019 the 'personal allowance' with 0% was up to £12,500 in income, a 'basic rate' of 20% tax was paid on £12,500 to £50,000, a higher rate was 40% on income over £50,000, and a top rate of 45% over £150,000. The top rate of income tax has been dramatically cut since 1979, while taxation for the richest people, who receive most money through capital gains, dividends, or corporate profits has been cut even further. People will be classified as liable to pay income tax whether or not they work through a company. From 2015 to 2019, the "personal allowance" was linked to the minimum wage, but only up to 30 hours a week of pay (as if people usually had a three-day weekend). This link was cut, and there is no personal allowance for National Insurance contributions, which fund the state pension, unemployment insurance (now partly the universal credit), and the insolvency fund. While self-employed people generally pay the same income tax (albeit with more exemptions and deductions) they pay 9% in National Insurance contributions, while an employee pays 12%. In addition, the employee's employer makes a standard 13.8% contribution, while the "self-employed" person has no employer to make such a contribution. These disparities give a large incentive for employers to misrepresent true employment status with "sham self-employment".

=== Working time and child care ===
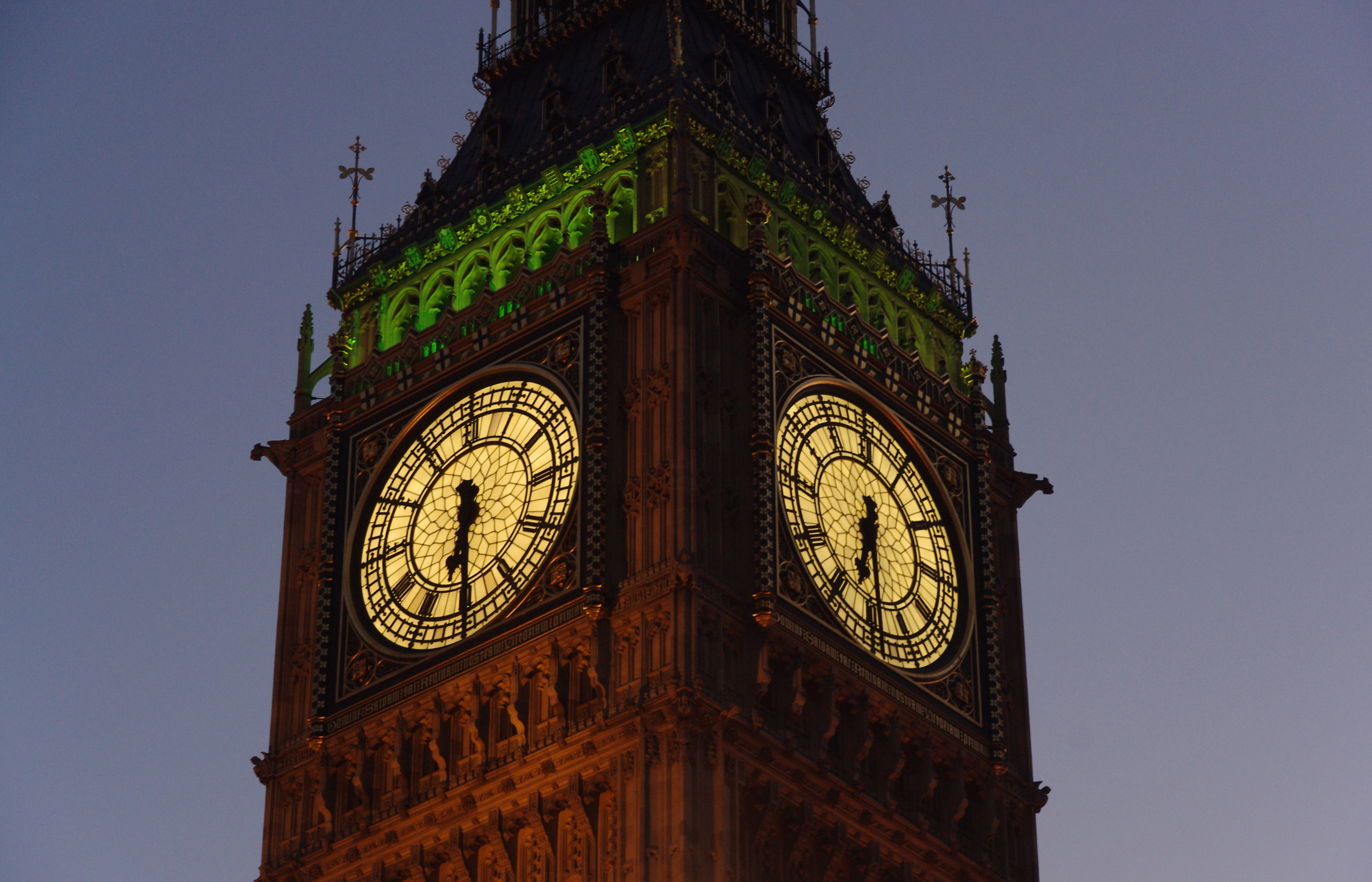
The UK has no explicit statute for minimum hours, although zero hours contracts have been used increasingly since the 2008 financial crisis. Since Autoclenz Ltd v Belcher [2011] UKSC 41, zero hours clauses have been held to be ineffective, so that workers are legally entitled to a reasonable amount of work according to their usual patterns.

The Working Time Regulations 1998 and the Working Time Directive give every worker the right to paid holidays, breaks and the right to a weekend. Following international law, every worker must have at least 28 days, or four full weeks in paid holidays each year (including public holidays). There is no qualifying period for this, or any other working time right, because the law seeks to ensure both a balance between work and life, and that people have enough rest and leisure to promote better physical and psychological health and safety. Because the purpose is for workers to have the genuine freedom to rest, employers may not give a worker "rolled up holiday pay", for instance an additional 12.5% in a wage bill, in lieu of taking actual holidays. However, if the worker has not used his or her holidays before the job terminates, the employer must give an additional payment for the unused holiday entitlement.

People working at night may only work 8 hours in any 24-hour period on average, or simply 8 hours at most if the work is classified as "hazardous". Moreover, every worker must receive at least 11 consecutive hours of rest in a 24-hour period, and in every day workers must have at least a 20-minute break in any 6-hour period. The most controversial provisions in the working time laws concerns the right to a maximum working week. The labour movement has always bargained for a shorter working week as it increased economic productivity: the current maximum is 48 hours, averaged over 17 weeks, but it does not apply to the self-employed or people who can set their own hours of work. In Pfeiffer v Deutsches Rotes Kreuz the Court of Justice said the rules aim to protect workers who possess less bargaining power and autonomy over the way they do their jobs. Nevertheless, the UK government negotiated to let workers "opt out" of the 48-hour maximum by individually signing an opt out form. Theoretically and legally, a worker may always change his or her mind after having opted out, and has a right to sue the employer for suffering any detriment if they so choose. "On call" time where people must be ready to work is working time. The European Court of Justice's decision in Landeshauptstadt Kiel v Jaegar that junior doctors' on call time was working time led a number of countries to exercise the same "opt out" derogation as the UK, but limited to medical practice. The Health and Safety Executive is the UK body charged with enforcing the working time laws, but it has taken a "light touch" approach to enforcement. There are new employment plans by the Starmer ministry to reduce hours to a four-day week in the future.

Possibly the most important time off during working life will be to care for newly born or adopted children. However, unlike paid holidays or breaks that are available for "workers", child care rights are restricted to "employees". They are also less favourable for male parents, which exacerbates the gender pay gap as women take more time out of their careers than men. Going beyond the minimum in the Pregnant Workers Directive, the Employment Rights Act 1996 section 71 to 73 and the Maternity and Parental Leave etc. Regulations 1999 guarantee maternity leave for 52 weeks in total, but in four steps, paid and unpaid. First, women must take two weeks compulsory leave at the time of child birth. Second, and covering the compulsory leave, there is a right to 6 weeks' leave paid at 90% of ordinary earnings. Third, there is a right to 33 weeks' leave at the statutory rate, or 90% of ordinary earnings if this is lower, which was £138.18 per week in 2014. The government reimburses employers for the costs according to the employer's size and national insurance contributions. Fourth, the mother may take additional, but unpaid maternity leave for another 13 weeks. A contract of employment can always be, and if collectively bargained usually is, more generous. There is no qualifying period for the right to unpaid leave, but the mother must have worked for 26 weeks for the right to paid leave. The mother must also tell the employer 15 weeks before the date of the expected birth, in writing if the employer requests it. Employees may not suffer any professional detriment or dismissal while they are absent, and should be able to return to the same job after 26 weeks, or another suitable job after 52 weeks. If parents adopt, then the rights to leave follow maternity rules for one primary carer. However, for fathers ordinarily, the position is less generous. The Paternity and Adoption Leave Regulations 2002 entitle a father to 2 weeks leave, at the statutory rate of pay. Both parents may also take "parental leave". This means that, until a child turns 5, or a disabled child turns 18, parents can take up to 13 weeks unpaid leave. Unless there is another collective agreement in place, employees should give 21 days' notice, no more than 4 weeks in a year, at least 1 week at a time, and the employer can postpone the leave for 6 months if business would be unduly disrupted. Otherwise, employees have a right to suffer no detriment, nor be dismissed, and have the right to their previous jobs back. To redress the imbalance between women and men bearing children, the Additional Paternity Leave Regulations 2010 made it possible for the woman to transfer up to 26 weeks of her maternity leave entitlements to her partner. This has not stopped the gender pay gap.

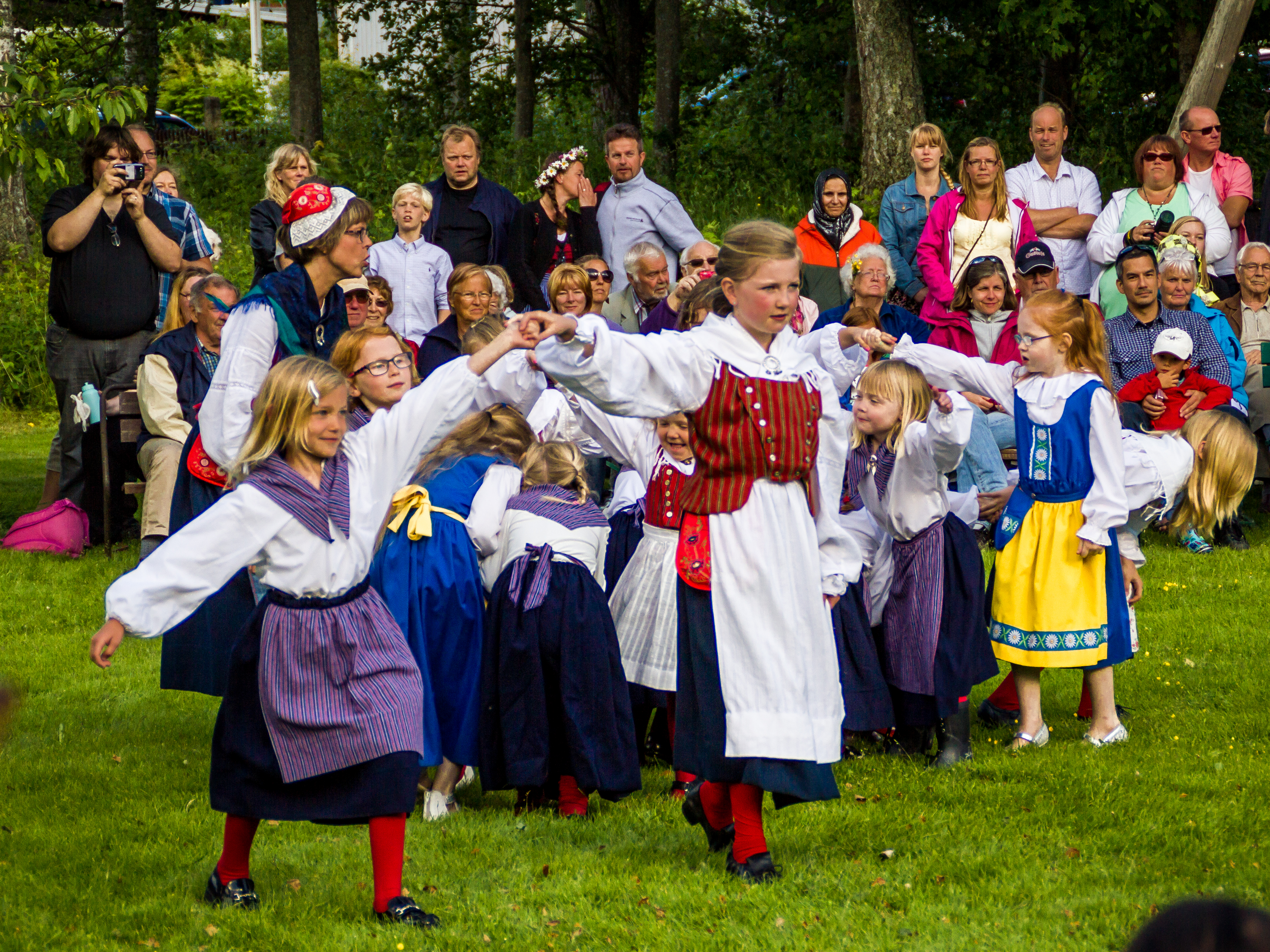
Unlike the UK, Swedish parental leave is equally available to both parents, though men take around 24% of the leave.

In further specific situations, there are a jumble of other rights to leave spread across the Employment Rights Act 1996 sections 55 to 80I. "Emergency leave" is, under the Employment Rights Act 1996 section 57A, available for employees to deal with birth or a child's issues at school, as well as other emergencies such as dependents' illness or death, so long as the employee informs the employer as soon as reasonably practicable. In Qua v John Ford Morrison Solicitors, Cox J emphasised that there is no requirement to deliver daily updates. After Employment Act 2002, employees gained the right to request flexible working patterns for the purpose of caring for a child under the age of 6, or a disabled child under age 18. The right to make the request is contained in Employment Rights Act 1996 section 80F, and despite the fact that employers may decline the request, employers grant requests in 80% of cases. An employee must make the request in writing, the employer must reply in writing, and can only decline the request on the basis of a correct fact assessment, and within 8 grounds listed in section 80G, which generally concern business and organisational necessity. In Commotion Ltd v Rutty a toy warehouse assistant was refused a reduction to part-time work because, according to the manager, everyone needed to work full-time to maintain "team spirit". The Employment Appeal Tribunal ruled that because "team spirit" was not one of the legitimate grounds for refusal, Rutty should get compensation, which is set at a maximum of 8 weeks' pay. Finally, the Employment Rights Act 1996 sections 63D-I give employees (and agency workers are expressly included) the right to request the right to get time off for training.

=== Occupational pensions ===
There are three "pillars" of the UK pension system, which aim to ensure dignity and a fair income in retirement. The first pillar is the state pension, administered by the government, and funded by National Insurance contributions. The third pillar is private, or "personal pensions", which individuals buy themselves. The second pillar, and deriving from the contract of employment, is occupational pensions. Traditionally, these came from a collective agreement, or from an employer setting one up. The Pensions Act 2008 gives every "jobholder" (defined as a worker, age 16 to 75, with wages between £5,035 and £33,540) the right to be automatically enrolled by the employer in an occupational pension, unless the jobholder chooses to opt out. This is a simple "defined contribution" scheme: whatever the jobholder contributes, they get out. Although collectively invested, benefits are individualised, meaning the risk of living longer and running out of money grows. To reduce administration costs, a non-departmental trust fund called the National Employment Savings Trust was established as a "public option" competing with private asset managers. Employers set aside an agreed percentage of jobholders' wages, and negotiate how much they will contribute. This is particularly important for people who have not created a union and collectively bargained for an occupational pension. Collectively bargained pensions are often better, and historically had "defined benefits": on retirement, people receive money based either on their final salary, or a career average of earnings for the rest of their lives. Living longer does not become an individual risk, but is collectivised among all contributors. In principle, the rules for pension trusts differ from ordinary law of trusts as pensions are not gifts and people pay for their benefits through their work. Pensions operating through contracts also engender mutual trust and confidence in the employment relationship. An employer is under a duty to inform their staff about how to make the best of their pension rights. Moreover, workers must be treated equally, on grounds of gender or otherwise, in their pension entitlements. The management of a pension trust must be partly codetermined by the pension beneficiaries, so that a minimum of one third of a trustee board are elected or "member nominated trustees". The Secretary of State has the power by regulation, as yet unused, to increase the minimum up to one half. Trustees are charged with the duty to manage the fund in the best interests of the beneficiaries, in a way that reflects their preferences, by investing the savings in company shares, bonds, real estate or other financial products.

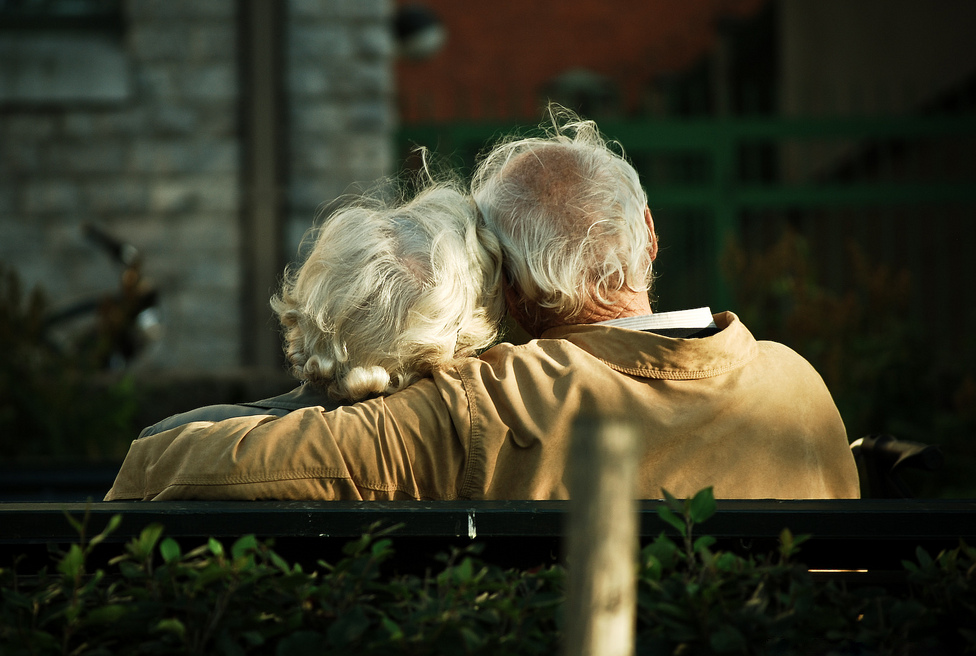
Every jobholder will from 2012 be automatically enrolled in an occupational pension, and can codetermine how their retirement savings are invested and their voice in company shares is used.

Because pension schemes save up significant amounts of money, which many people rely on in retirement, protection against an employer's insolvency, or dishonesty, or risks from the stock market were seen as necessary after the 1992 Robert Maxwell scandal. Defined contribution funds must be administered separately, not subject to an employer's undue influence. The Insolvency Act 1986 also requires that outstanding pension contributions are a preferential over creditors, except those with fixed security. However, defined benefit schemes are also meant to ensure everyone has a stable income regardless of whether they live a shorter or longer period after retirement. The Pensions Act 2004 sections 222 to 229 require that pension schemes have a minimum "statutory funding objective", with a statement of "funding principles", whose compliance is periodically evaluated by actuaries, and shortfalls are made up. The Pensions Regulator is the non-departmental body which is meant to oversee these standards, and compliance with trustee duties, which cannot be excluded. However, in The Pensions Regulator v Lehman Brothers, the Supreme Court concluded that if the Pensions Regulator issued a "Financial Support Direction" to pay up funding, and it was not paid when a company had gone insolvent, this ranked like any other unsecured debt in insolvency, and did not have priority over banks that hold floating charges. In addition, there exists a Pensions Ombudsman who may hear complaints and take informal action against employers who fall short of their statutory duties. If all else fails, the Pension Protection Fund guarantees a sum is ensured, up to a statutory maximum.

=== Health and safety ===
Every employer must provide a "safe system of work". In the industrial revolution from 1802 the Factories Acts required workplaces to be cleaner, ventilated, with machinery fenced. The Acts restricted child labour and limited the working day. They targeted mines, or textile mills, before the Factories Act 1961 spread to all "factories": where an article is made or changed, or animals are kept and slaughtered. The Employer's Liability (Defective Equipment) Act 1969 made employers automatically liable for equipment with defects supplied by third parties. Because individual employees tend not to litigate, to ensure enforcement, there are inspectors under the Health and Safety at Work etc. Act 1974, enforced by the Health and Safety Executive. The HSE can delegate enforcement to local authorities. Inspectors have the power to investigate and require changes to workplace systems. HSWA 1974 section 2 also foresees that employees will set up their own workplace committees, elected by the employees and with the power to codetermine health and safety matters with management. Health and safety regulations remain in line with the European-wide harmonised requirements of the Health and Safety Directive.

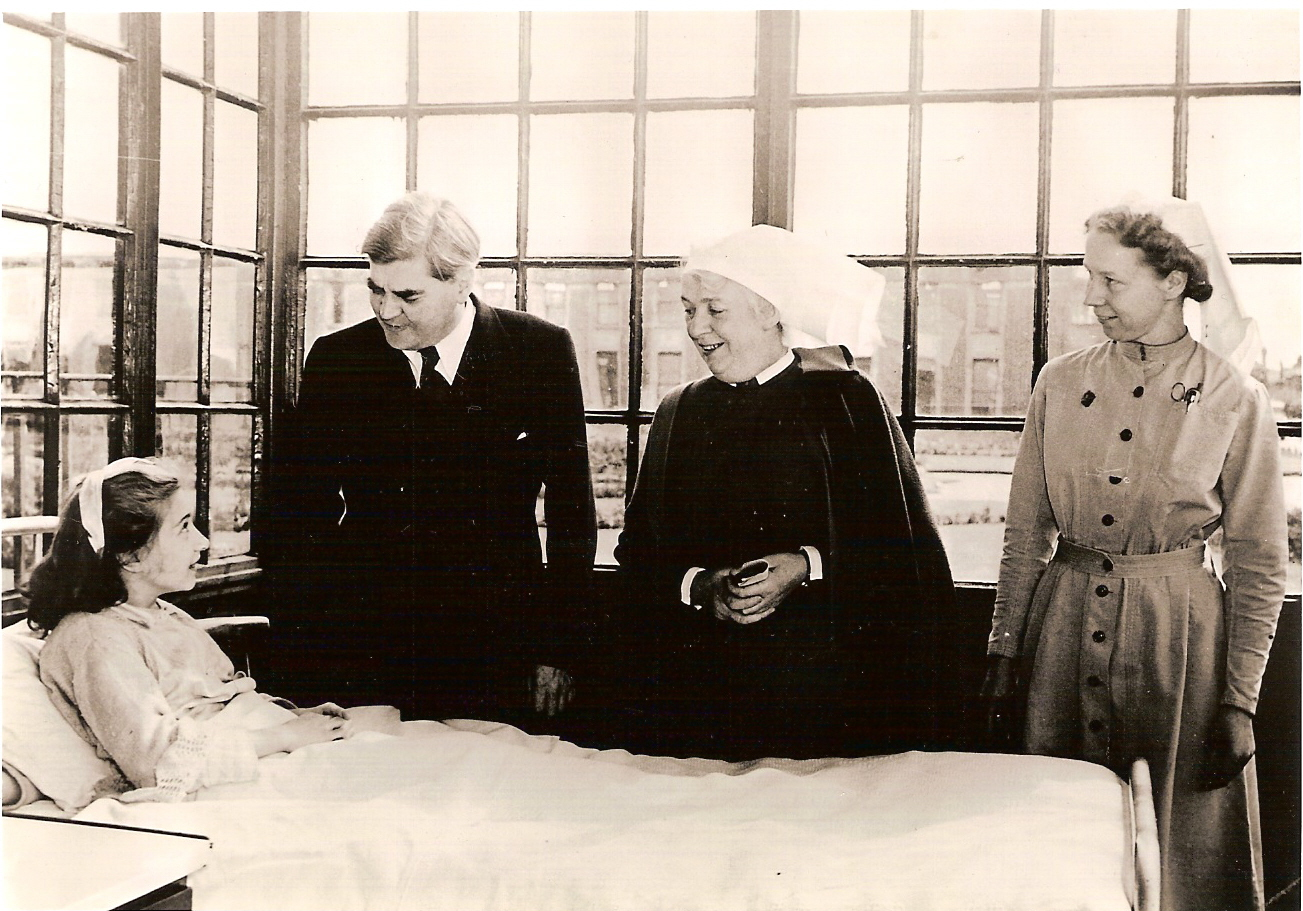
Nye Bevan, Minister of Health when the NHS was founded

The most important protection for people's health has been the National Health Service (NHS), founded by the National Health Service Act 1946. The National Health Service Act 2006 entitles everyone to health care in the UK, and is funded through the tax system. If people are injured at work, they may be treated regardless of their means to pay. There is also the right, under the Social Security Contributions and Benefits Act 1992, to statutory sick pay. People at work can also sue for compensatory damages whenever they are injured and employers have breached a statutory duty. They can claim for the injury itself, loss of income, and relatives or dependents may recover small sums to reflect distress. Employers are vicariously liable for all agents acting for them in the "course of employment" whenever their actions have a "close connection" to the job, and even if it breaks an employer's rules. An employer only has a defence if an employee, on a "frolic of his own", was not placed by an employer in a position to cause harm. Under the Employers' Liability (Compulsory Insurance) Act 1969, employers must take out insurance for all injury costs. Insurance companies may not sue their employee to recover costs unless there is fraud. Until the mid-20th century there was an "unholy trinity" of defences: common employment, volenti non fit injuria, and contributory negligence. These are gone, but a fourth defence taken advantage of by employers is ex turpi causa non oritur actio, that if the employee was engaged in any illegal activity they may not claim compensation for injuries. In Hewison v Meridian Shipping Services Pte Ltd Hewison concealed his epilepsy so that he could work offshore, and so was technically guilty of illegally attempting to gain a pecuniary advantage by deception under the Theft Act 1968 section 16. After being struck in the head by a defective gangplank he suffered worse fits than before, but the Court of Appeal, by a majority, held his illegal act precluded any compensation.

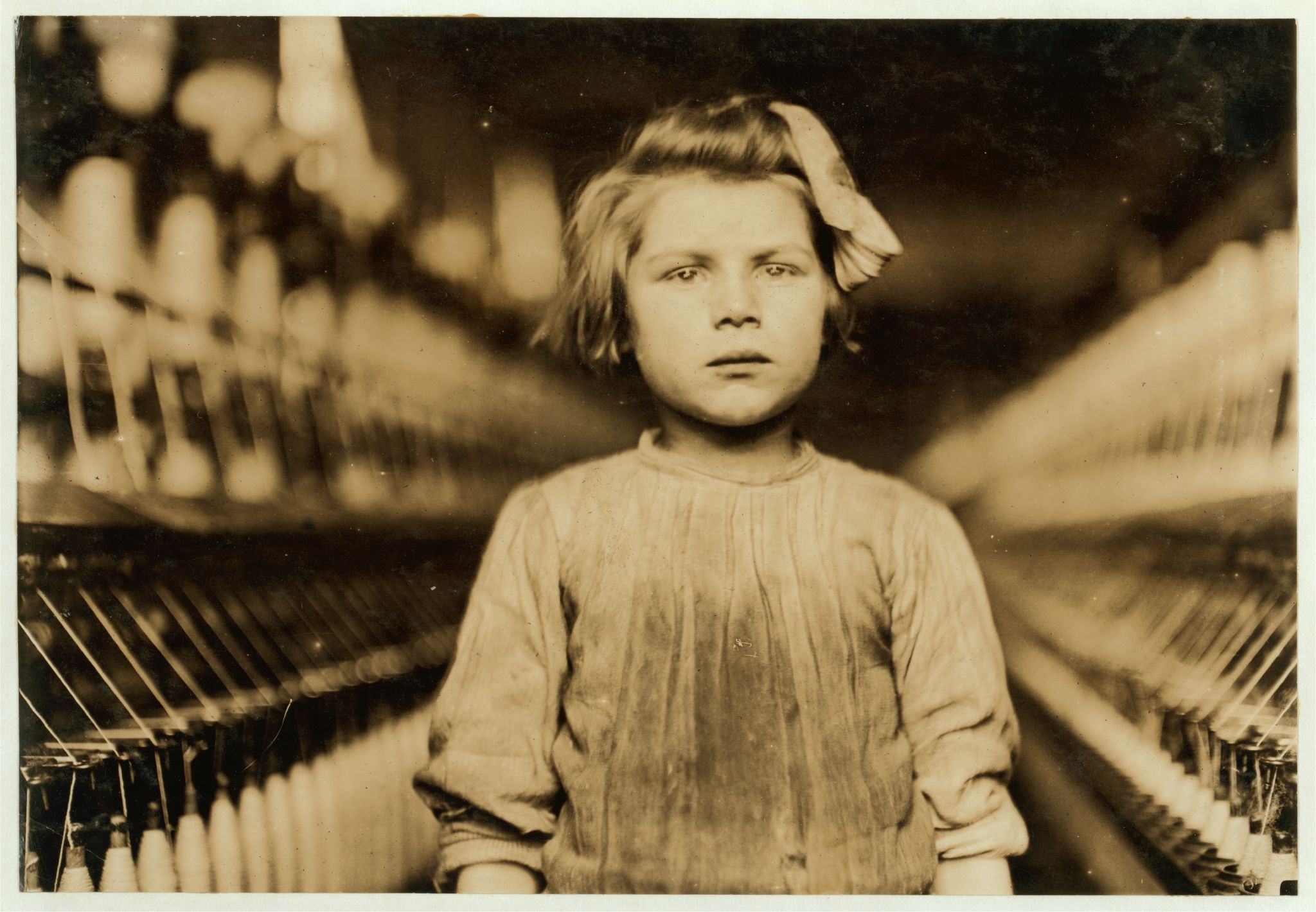
19th century regulations limited child labour and working time in factories and mines, but employers were not always liable for accidents until 1937.

Tort law remains relevant when there is scientific uncertainty about an injury's cause. In asbestos disease cases, a worker may have been employed at a number of companies where he was exposed to asbestos, but his injury cannot with certainty be traced to any one, and some may be insolvent. In Fairchild v Glenhaven Funeral Services Ltd, the House of Lords held that if any employer had materially increased the risk of harm to the worker, they could would be jointly and severally liable and could be sued for the full sum, leaving it up to them to seek contribution from others and thus the risk of other businesses' insolvency. For a brief period, in Barker v Corus the House of Lords then decided that employers would only be liable on a proportionate basis, thus throwing the risk of employers' insolvency back onto workers. Immediately Parliament passed the Compensation Act 2006 section 3 to reverse the decision on its facts. It has also been held in Chandler v Cape plc that even though a subsidiary company is the direct employer of a worker, a parent company will owe a duty of care. Thus shareholders may not be able to hide behind the corporate veil to escape their obligations for the health and safety of the workforce.

=== Privacy and free expression ===
Civil liberties at work, particularly the right to privacy and freedom of expression, are part of the UK's constitution and are protected in multiple statutes. Under the Human Rights Act 1998, section 3, domestic law should be interpreted so far as possible to be compatible with the European Convention on Human Rights. If a compatible interpretation would bend an Act's words too much, section 4 requires courts to issue a declaration of incompatibility, for Parliament to amend the law. Under section 6, courts are public bodies, themselves bound to act compatibly with human rights. The first main right affecting the workplace is privacy, which is protected in ECHR article 8 and the Data Protection Act 2018, which includes the General Data Protection Regulation. First, it is an offence under the Regulation of Investigatory Powers Act 2000 section 1(3) for an employer to intercept any private communication, such as reading email, searching an inbox, or tracking calls or websites, without lawful authority. Second, the employer must preserve a minimum content of privacy, whatever it tells an employee. In Barbulescu v Romania the European Court of Human Rights held that a sales engineer had a 'reasonable expectation of privacy' against personal messages to his brother and fiancé being read, even though he was told not to use a workplace Yahoo messenger for personal reasons, because he was not specifically told his messages would be checked. Even if he was, "an employer's instructions cannot reduce private social life in the workplace to zero. Respect for private life and for the privacy of correspondence continues to exist, even if these may be restricted in so far as necessary". An employer cannot read private messages, for instance to a fiancé or family member. This followed several other similar cases. In Halford v United Kingdom the European Court of Human Rights held that intercepting an employee's phone calls violated their private life, particularly since they had not been told of any extent of monitoring, and they had been given a reasonable expectation of privacy. In Smith and Grady v United Kingdom the Court held that the private life of a woman in the Royal Air Force was violated after an investigation and intimate questioning of her sex life and HIV status. Then, in Copland v United Kingdom the Court found that it violated ECHR article 8 for a manager to monitor the calls and internet use of an employee, and then insinuate and gossip about the employee having an affair, again without any warning. On the other hand, in Kopke v Germany, the Court held that video surveillance of employees was lawful, after an employer had found money was going missing from the till, in pursuit of the legitimate aim of protecting property rights: implicitly, general video surveillance without any reasonable suspicion of a wrongful act would be a violation. Third, under the GDPR personal data can only be processed by consent or law, fairly, transparently, with a legitimate purpose, kept secure, and no longer than needed. The law distinguishes between ordinary data, and 'sensitive' personal data, such as political opinions, union membership, or biometric data. There is a right to have any inaccurate data rectified, and erased if consent is withdrawn and there is no longer a lawful ground for it to be kept. All rights are backed by criminal offences and enforceable through complaints to the Information Commissioner.

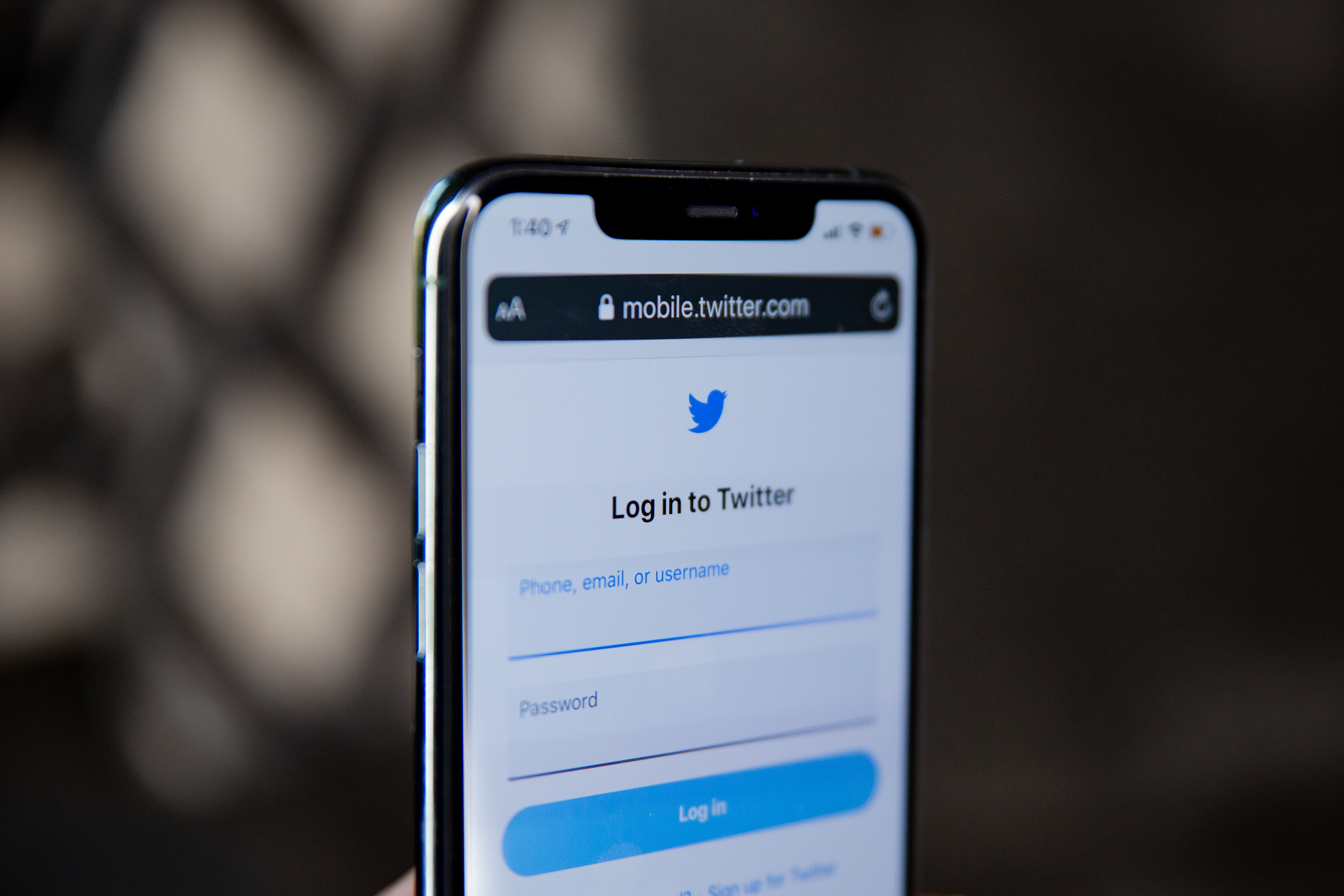
Everyone has a basic right to freedom of expression, including social media posts outside work without any association with the employer.

The second main civil liberty in the workplace is the right to freedom of expression, protected in ECHR article 10. First, freedom of expression includes statements of political opinion, as well as association. In Vogt v Germany it was held that dismissing a teacher, simply for being a member of the German Communist Party and expressing political views, violated ECHR article 10. There was no expression of disobedience to the country's constitution or democratic order, and so a complete ban on party membership was disproportionate. Second there could be disclosures to improve an employer's workplace practices. In Heinisch v Germany it was held to be unlawful to dismiss from an elderly care home a nurse who complained to a criminal prosecutor about shortages in the home, creating intolerable pressure on staff, and putting patients at risk: there was a failure to balance the public interest in care for the elderly and the employer's business interests, and dismissal was an extreme sanction that could have a chilling effect on all freedom of speech if allowed. Third, there is explicit protection for disclosures in the public interest, for instance of unlawful activity, under the Employment Rights Act 1996 section 43A to 43K. These "whistleblower" provisions protect 'qualifying disclosures' such as any criminal offence, a breach of legal duty, miscarriage of justice, health and safety violations, environmental damage, or deliberate concealment of wrongs. The disclosures must be made with a reasonable belief in their truth, not for personal gain, and need not be made first to employers if the employee reasonably believes they may be subject to detriment. This does not protect employees against breaching the Official Secrets Act 1989. Beyond privacy and expression, the human rights that also affect the workplace include the right to a fair trial, the right to property, and critically the right to freedom of association in ECHR article 11, that protects workplace participation.

== Workplace participation ==
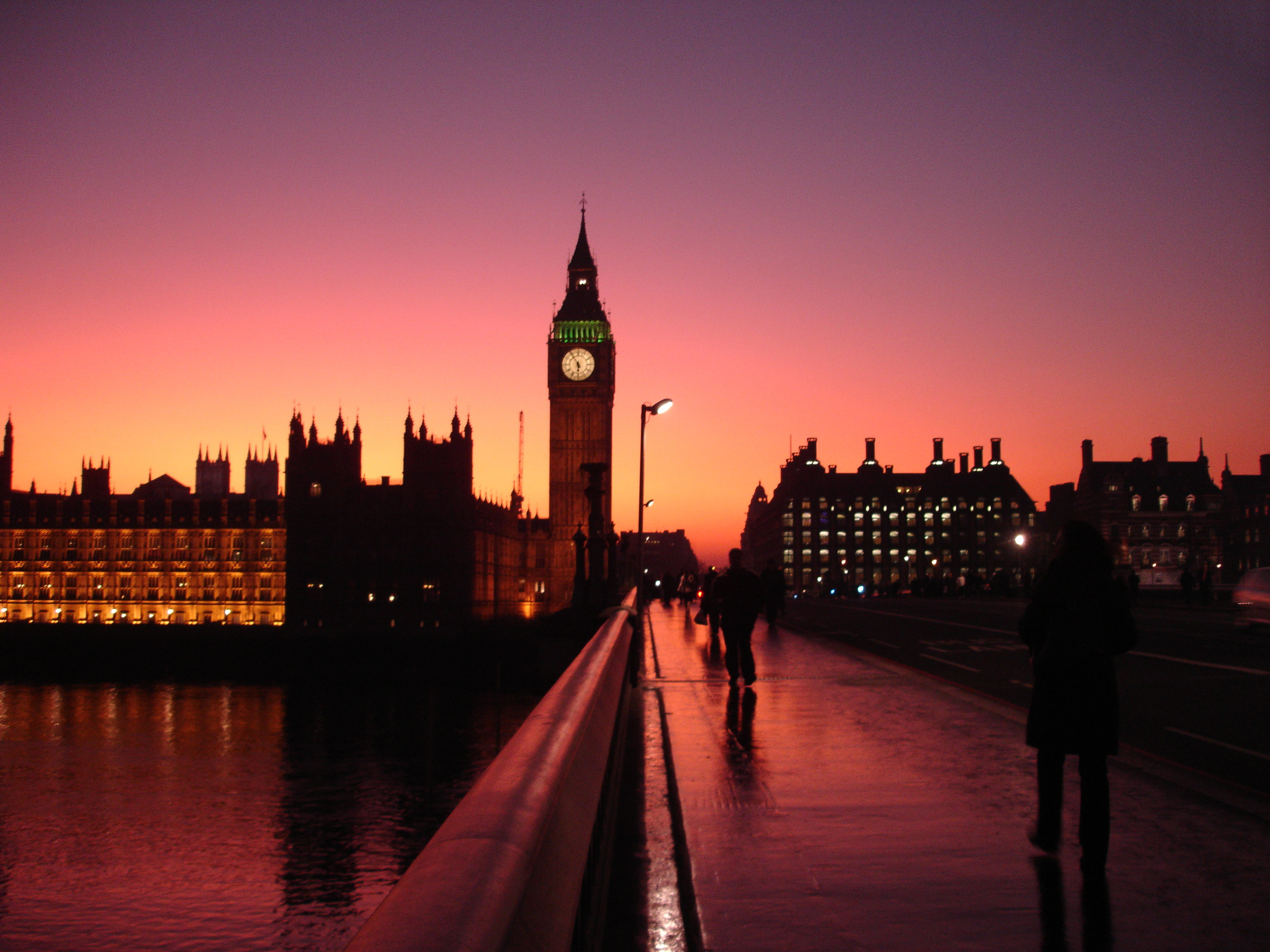
UK labour law's central goal since the Trade Disputes Act 1906 has been for people to vote in their workplace, like in Parliament, to achieve "a fair day's wage for a fair day's work". This happens through staff organising unions, using legal participation rights, and collectively bargaining.

While UK law creates a "charter protecting employees' rights" at work, people need a voice in enterprise management to get fair wages and standards beyond the minimum. In law, this means the right to vote for managers, or to vote on important issues such as pensions, and the right to collective bargaining. Trade unions are the main way that workers organise their voices. Unions aim to improve their members' lives at work. Unions are founded on contract, but members must have the right to elect the executive, not be excluded without good reason, and not be discriminated against by employers. Unions' main functions are organising and representing a workforce through statutory participation channels, collective bargaining, providing mutual assistance, and being a forum for social deliberation and activism. Collective agreements, which unions make with employers, usually aim to set fair scales of pay and working hours, require pensions, training and workplace facilities, and update standards as the enterprise changes. Trade union bargaining power rests, in the last resort, on collective action. To balance employer power to change the employment relation's terms, or dismiss staff, an official trade union has been protected by law in its right to strike. Since the 1875, UK law has said collective action, including the right to strike, is lawful if it is "in contemplation or furtherance of a trade dispute". Since the 1980s, there have also been a number of requirements for balloting the workforce and warning the employer, suppression of sympathy strikes and picketing. In these respects UK law falls below international labour standards. There are legal rights to information about workplace changes and consultation on redundancies, business restructuring and management generally. Finally, there are a small number of rights for direct participation in workplace and company affairs, particularly pension management. In some enterprises, such as universities, staff can vote for representatives on boards that manage the enterprise.

=== Trade unions ===
In principle, UK law guarantees trade unions and their members freedom of association. This means people can organise their affairs in the way they choose, a right reflected in the ILO Right to Organise and Collective Bargaining Convention, 1949 and the European Convention on Human Rights, article 11. Under the ECHR article 11, freedom of association can only be restricted by law as is "necessary in a democratic society". Traditional common law and equity was superficially similar, since unions form through contract, and the association's property is held on trust for its members according to the association's rules. However, before Parliament became democratic, unions were suppressed for allegedly being in "restraint of trade" and their actions (particularly strikes to improve conditions at work) could be regarded as criminal conspiracy. Nineteenth century reformers, who recognised that unions were democratic, gradually succeeded in guaranteeing unions' freedom of association. The Trade Union Act 1871 aimed to keep the courts away from unions' internal affairs, while the Trade Disputes Act 1906 finally confirmed the right of unions to take collective action, free from liability in tort, if it was "in contemplation or furtherance of a trade dispute". The basic philosophy of "legal abstention" from union organisation lasted until 1971 when the Conservative government attempted comprehensive regulation. This intervention was reversed by Labour in 1974, but after 1979 unions became heavily regulated.

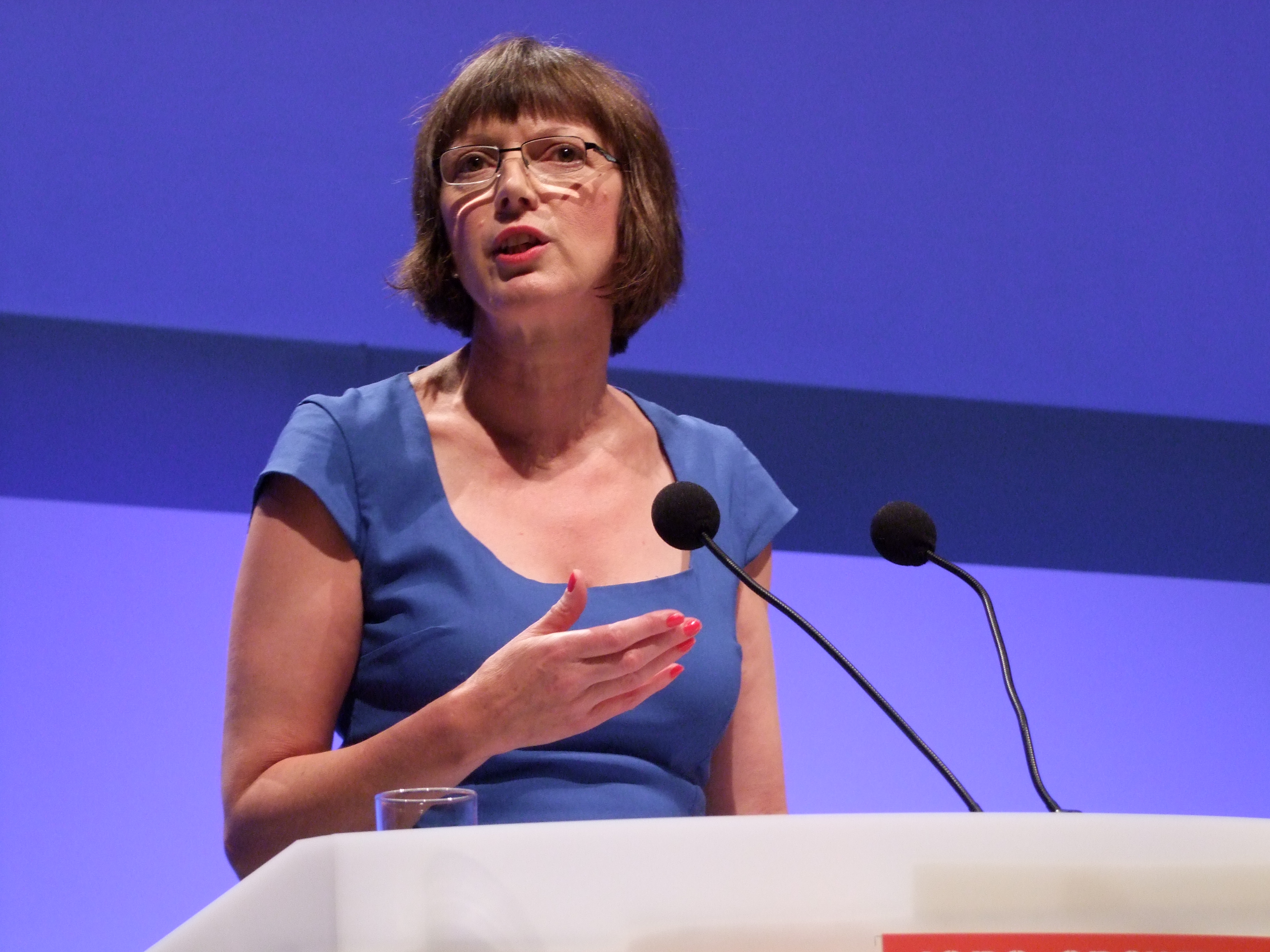
Between 2013 and 2022, Frances O'Grady was the General Secretary of the Trades Union Congress, which is the umbrella grouping for trade unions in England and Wales.

Today union governance can be configured in any manner, so long as it complies with the compulsory standards set by the Trade Union and Labour Relations (Consolidation) Act 1992. Before 1979, all unions had systems of elections and were democratic. In most the members elected union executives directly. However, it was thought that indirect elections (e.g. where members voted for delegates, who elected executives in conference) made a minority of unions more "out of touch" and militant than was natural. Trade Union and Labour Relations (Consolidation) Act 1992, section 46, requires that members have direct voting rights for the executive, which cannot stay in office for more than five years. In addition, rules were passed (though there was little evidence of problems before) saying no candidate may be unreasonably excluded from an election, all voters are equal, and postal ballots must be available. In practice, UK union elections are often competitive, although voter turnouts (without electronic voting) tend to be low. Minor procedural irregularities that would not affect outcomes do not undermine an election, but otherwise a Certification Officer can hear complaints about malpractice, make inquiries, and issue enforcement orders, which can in turn be appealed to the High Court. For example, in Ecclestone v National Union of Journalists Jake Ecclestone, who had been the Deputy General Secretary of the National Union of Journalists for 40 years, was dismissed by the executive. He attempted to run for election again, but the executive introduced a rule that candidates had to have the executive's "confidence". Smith J held the union had no express rule stating the executive could do this, nor could any be construed consistently with the democratic nature of the union's constitution. The executive's "new rule" was also contrary to TULRCA 1992 section 47, which prohibits unfair exclusions of candidates. Where statute is not explicit, standard principles of construction apply. There have been dissenting views, notably in Breen v Amalgamated Engineering Union, over the extent to which principles of natural justice may override a union's express rules. However, the better view appears that construction of a union's rules consistently with statutory principles of democratic accountability do require that express rules are disapplied if they undermine the "reasonable expectations" of members. In addition, "best practice" standards will be used to interpret union rules. In AB v CD, where the union's rules were silent on what would happen when an election was tied, the court referred to the Electoral Reform Society's guidance.

Beyond union governance through the vote and elections, members have five main statutory rights. First, although statute asserts that a union is "not a body corporate", in every practical sense it is: it can make contracts, commission torts, hold property, sue and be sued. The union's executives and officials carry out actions on its behalf, and their acts are attributed to it by ordinary principles of agency. However, if any union official acts ultra vires, beyond the union's powers, every member has a right to claim a remedy for the breach. For example, in Edwards v Halliwell a decision of the executive committee of the National Union of Vehicle Builders to increase membership fees was restrained, because the constitution required a two-thirds vote of members first. Second, TULRCA 1992 section 28 requires unions to keep accounts, giving a "true and fair" view of its financial affairs. Records are kept for six years, members have a right to inspect them, they are independently audited and overseen by the Certification Officer. Third, members have a right to not give contributions to the trade union's political fund, if there is one. Since the early success of the UK Labour Party in promoting working people's welfare through Parliament, both courts and Conservative governments attempted to suppress unions' political voice, particularly compared to funding by employers through control of corporations. Under TULRCA 1992 sections 72, 73 and 82, a union must hold a separate fund for any "political object" (such as advertising, lobbying or donations), members must approve the fund by ballot at least every 10 years, and individual members have a right to opt-out of it (unlike shareholders in companies). Unions must also have political objects in the constitution. In 2010, just 29 from 162 unions had political funds, though 57 per cent of members contributed. This generated £22m. Consolidated statistics on corporate political spending, by contrast, are not available.

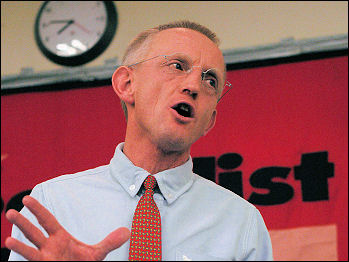
Reflecting the democratic tradition of British unions, in 2007, 2010 and 2013 Jerry Hicks challenged the general secretary of Unite the Union, and only lost by small margins in the system of voting by postal ballots among members.

Fourth, members must be treated fairly if they are disciplined by a union, in accordance with judicially developed principles of natural justice. For example, in Roebuck v NUM (Yorkshire Area) No 2 Templeman J held that it was unfair that Arthur Scargill was on the appeal panel for journalists being disciplined for appearing as witnesses against a libel action by Scargill himself. In another example, Esterman v NALGO held that Miss Esterman could not be disciplined for taking up an election counting job outside of her work, especially since the power of the union to restrain her was not clearly in its own rules. Fifth, members cannot be expelled from the union without a fair reason, set out in the statutory grounds under TULRCA 1992 section 174. This could include an expulsion under the Bridlington Principles, an agreement among unions to maintain solidarity and not attempt to "poach" each other's members. However, the legislation was amended after ASLEF v United Kingdom to make clear that unions may exclude members whose beliefs or actions are opposed to the union's legitimate objectives. In ASLEF, a member named Lee was involved in the British National Party, a neo-fascist organisation committed to white supremacy, and Lee himself was involved in violence and intimidation against Muslim people and women. The European Court of Human Rights held that ASLEF was entitled to expel Lee because, so long as it did not abuse its organisational power or lead to individual hardship, "unions must remain free to decide in accordance with union rules, questions concerning admission to and expulsion from the union." Lastly, union members also have the more dubious "right" to not strike in accordance with the decision of the executive. This precludes a union disciplining members who break solidarity, and has been criticised by the International Labour Organization for undermining a union's effectiveness, in breach of core labour standards.

=== Collective bargaining ===
The right of workers to collectively bargain with employers for a "fair day's wage for a fair day's work" is regarded as a fundamental right in common law, by the European Convention on Human Rights article 11, and in international law. Historically the UK had, however, left the procedure for making collective agreements, and their content, largely untouched by law. This began to change from 1971, though by contrast to other countries in the Commonwealth, Europe, or the United States the UK remains comparatively "voluntarist". In principle, it is always possible for an employer and a trade union to come voluntarily to any collective agreement. Employers and unions would usually aim to develop an annually updated wage scale for workers, fair and flexible working time, holidays and breaks, transparent and just procedures for hiring or dismissals, fair and jointly administered pensions, and a commitment to work together for the enterprise's success. In 2010, around 32 per cent of the UK workforce was covered by a collective agreement, leaving around two-thirds of the British workforce with little influence over the terms of their work.

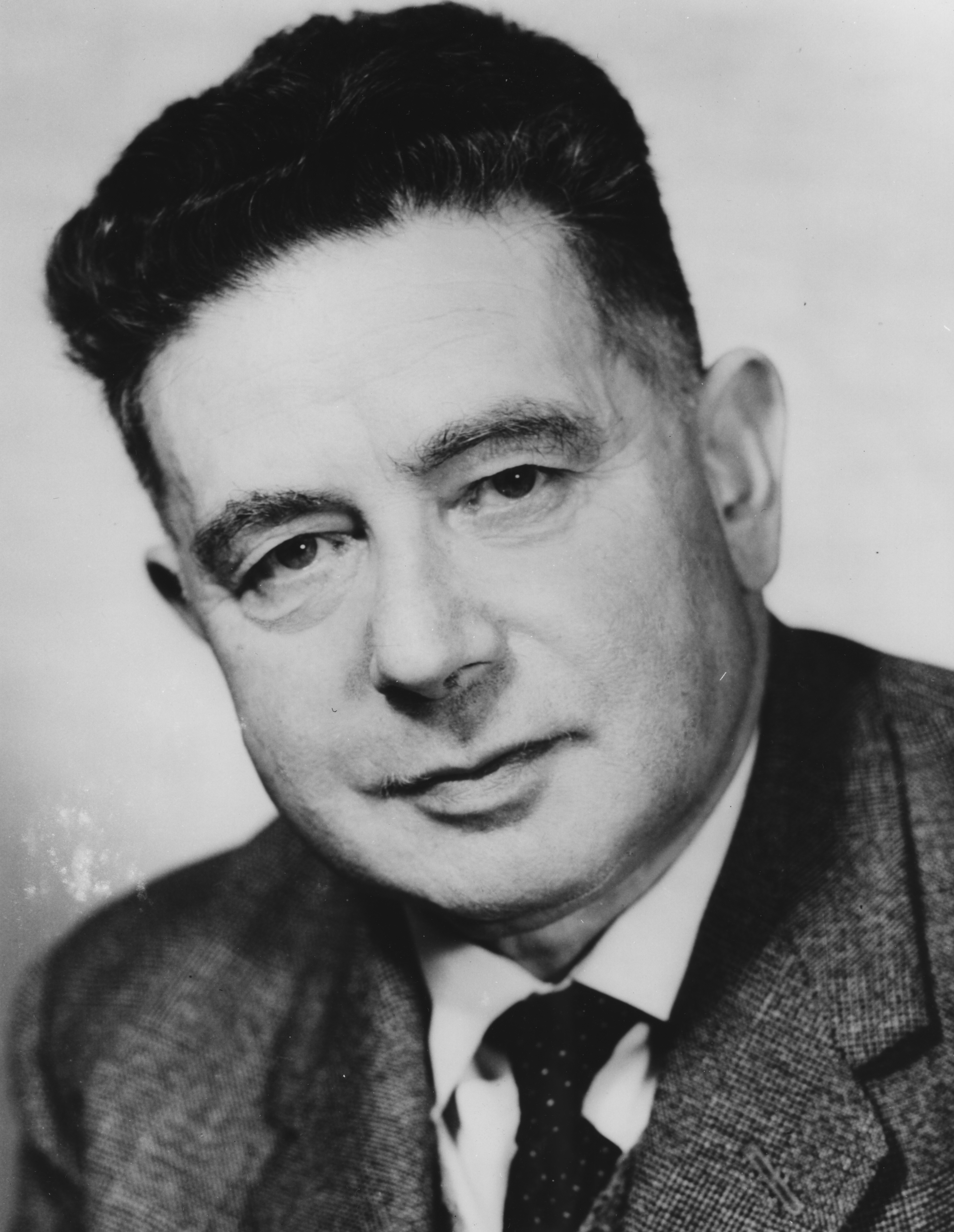
Otto Kahn-Freund (1900–1979), was a Berlin Labour Court judge who was forced out in 1933, heavily influenced the idea of UK labour law as "collective laissez-faire".

Traditionally, if workers organise a union, their last resort to get an employer to the bargaining table was to threaten collective action, including exercising their right to strike. In addition, the Trade Union and Labour Relations (Consolidation) Act 1992 Schedule A1 contains a statutory procedure for workers to become recognised for collective bargaining. To use this procedure, first, a trade union must be certified as independent and the workplace must have a minimum of 21 workers. Second, there must not already be a recognised trade union. This caused particular problems in R (National Union of Journalists) v Central Arbitration Committee as the Court of Appeal held that a recognised union which lacked any significant support could block the bargaining claim of a union with support. Third, the union must identify an appropriate "bargaining unit" for a collective agreement, which a government body named the Central Arbitration Committee (CAC) can verify and approve. On the union's proposal, the CAC must take into account whether the proposed bargaining unit is "compatible with effective management", as well as the employer's views and the characteristics of the workers. The CAC has broad discretion, and may only be challenged by an employer under the general principles of natural justice in administrative law. In R (Kwik-Fit (GB) Ltd) v CAC the Court of Appeal found that the CAC's determination that the appropriate bargaining unit was all of Kwik Fit's workers within the M25 London ring road. The union's recommendation is the starting point and the CAC is entitled to prefer this over an employer's alternative, especially since the employer will often attempt to define a larger "unit" so as to limit the likelihood of union members holding greater majority support. Fourth, once the bargaining unit is defined, the CAC may be satisfied that there is majority support for the union to represent the workforce and will make a recognition declaration. Alternatively, fifth, it may determine that the position is less clear and that a secret ballot is in the interests of good industrial relations. Sixth, if a ballot takes place both the union and the employer should have access to employees, and be able to distribute their arguments, and threats, bribes or undue influence are forbidden. Seventh, when a vote takes place the union must have at least 10 per cent membership, and win 50 per cent of the vote, or least 40 per cent of those entitled to vote. If the union wins a majority, the eighth and final step is that if the parties do not reach an agreement the CAC will regulate the collective agreement for the parties and the result will be legally binding. This contrasts to the basic position, under TULRCA 1992 section 179, which presumes that collective agreements are not intended to create legal relations. The long, problematic procedure, was partly based on the model of the US National Labor Relations Act 1935, but because of its cumbersome nature it strongly encourages the parties to seek voluntary agreement in the spirit of cooperation and good faith.

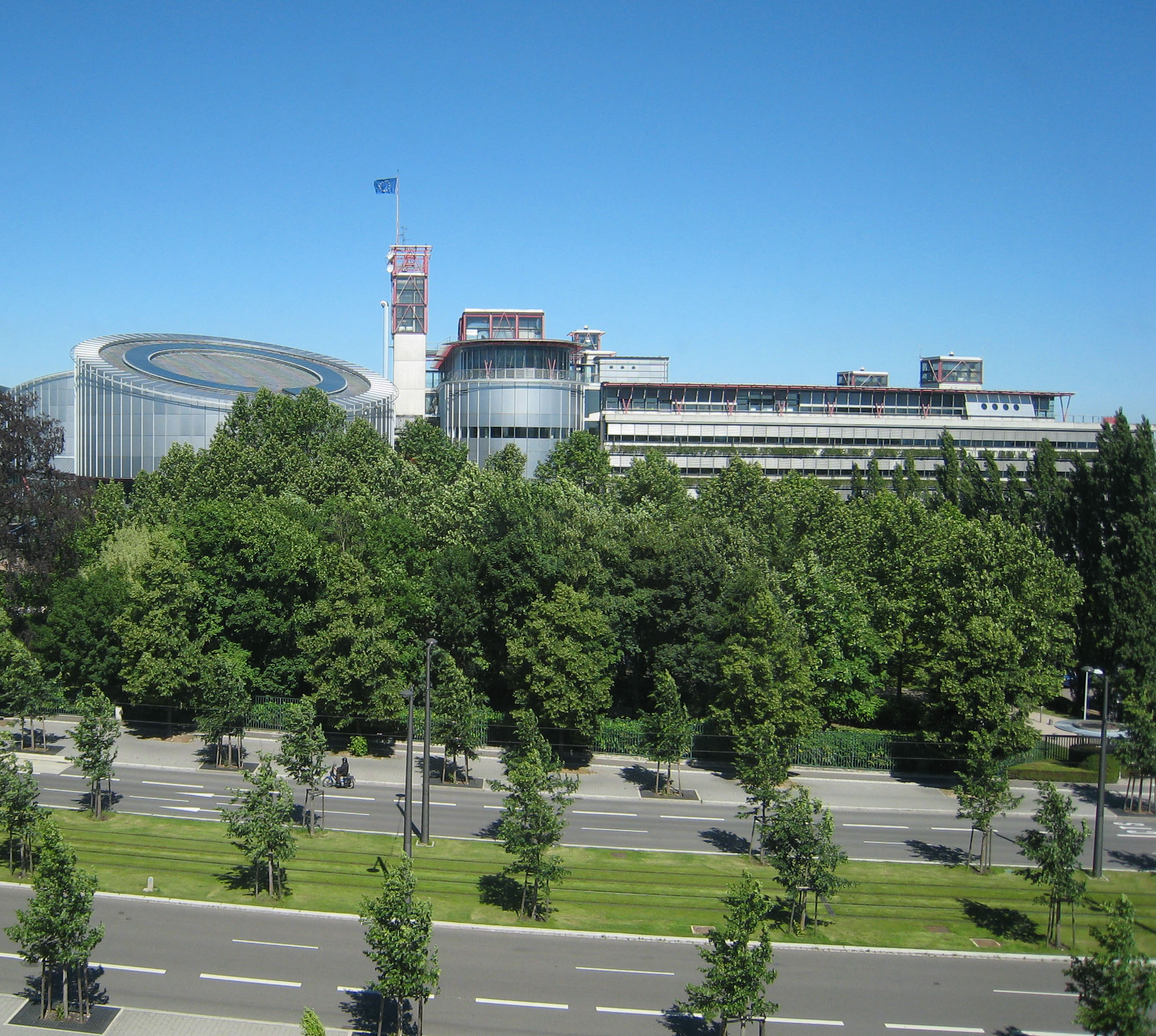
The European Court of Human Rights has continually held, like the UK courts, that collective bargaining is a basic right guaranteed by ECHR article 11.

Though most collective agreements will come about voluntarily, the law has sought to ensure that workers have true freedom of association by prohibiting employers from deterring union membership, and by creating positive rights for members. First, the Trade Union and Labour Relations (Consolidation) Act 1992 sections 137-143 make it unlawful for employers, including agencies, to refuse anyone employment on grounds of union membership. The courts will interpret the legislation purposively to protect union activities, with the same strictness as other anti-discrimination laws. Second, TULRCA 1992 sections 146-166 state that workers may not be subject to any detriment or dismissal. For example, in Fitzpatrick v British Railways Board the Board dismissed of a lady who had been a member of a Trotskyist group (which promoted international socialism). The Board justified this on the ground that she had not told the employer about having previously worked for the Ford Motor Company, and so for 'untruthfulness and lack of trust'. Woolf LJ held that this was not the true reason - Trotskyism was the issue. The dismissal was unlawful under section 152. Given the technicality of the legislation, the most important case is Wilson and Palmer v United Kingdom, where Wilson's pay was not increased by the Daily Mail because he wished to remain on the union collective agreement, and Palmer's pay was not put up by 10 per cent because he would not consent to leaving the union, the NURMTW. The European Court of Human Rights held that any ambiguity about protection in UK law contravened ECHR article 11 because,

the essence of a voluntary system of collective bargaining is that it must be possible for a trade union which is not recognised by an employer to take steps including, if necessary, organising industrial action, with a view to persuading the employer to enter into collective bargaining with it on those issues which the union believes are important for its members' interests.... employees should be free to instruct or permit the union to make representations to their employer or to take action in support of their interests on their behalf. If workers are prevented from so doing, their freedom to belong to a trade union, for the protection of their interests, becomes illusory.

In principle, like any victimisation case in discrimination law, 'a detriment exists if a reasonable worker would or might take the view that the [treatment] was in all the circumstances to his detriment'. If the UK statutes are not updated, the Human Rights Act 1998 section 3 requires interpretation of the common law, or statute, to reflect ECHR principles. More specific legislation, with the Data Protection Act 1998 sections 17-19 and the Employment Relations Act 1999 (Blacklists) Regulations 2010, penalises a practice of recording or blacklisting union members, and potentially leads to criminal sanctions for employers and agencies who do so.

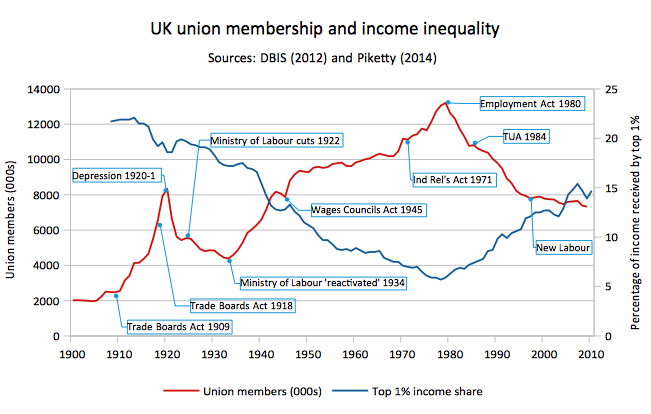
Income inequality surged as union membership declined from 1980, when people stopped being automatically enrolled in their union. A "closed shop" is unlawful, but with a right to opt out, unions can collectively agree that staff automatically become members.

Third, union members have a right to be represented by union officials in any disciplinary or grievance meeting under Employment Relations Act 1999 sections 10-15. This can be particularly important when a worker is in trouble with management. Fourth, an employer must permit officials of independent trade unions, which it recognises for collective bargaining, to a reasonable amount of time off to fulfill their role. Also, union members have a right to a reasonable amount of time off during work hours also to participate in meetings about agreements with the employer, or voting for elections. An ACAS Code of Practice sets out the general guidelines. A final "right" is that under TULRCA 1992 a worker may not be compelled to become a union member in what used to be called closed shop arrangements. Collective agreements had required that employers did not hire anyone who was not a union member. However, the European Court of Human Rights decided in 1981 that "freedom of association" under article 11 also entailed "freedom from association". This shift in the law coincided with the start of a Europe-wide trend toward falling union membership, as the closed shop had been the main mechanism to keep up union support, and thus collective bargaining for fairer workplaces. The ECHR does not, however, prevent unions pursuing fair share agreements, where non-union members contribute to union fees for the services they get for collective bargaining. Nor does it prevent collective agreements that would automatically enroll staff in the trade union, as happens under the Pensions Act 2008, with the right for the worker to opt-out if they chose.

=== Collective and strike action ===
The right of workers to collectively withdraw their labour has always been used to make employers stick to a collective agreement. At critical moments of history, it also combatted political repression (e.g. the Peasants' Revolt of 1381, and the Indian Independence Movement up to 1947), prevented military coups against democratic governments (e.g. the general strike in Germany against the Kapp Putsch in 1920), and overthrew dictatorships (e.g. in the 2008 Egyptian general strike). Anti-democratic regimes cannot tolerate social organisation they do not control, which is why the right to strike is fundamental to every democratic society, and a recognised human right in international law. Historically, the UK recognised the right to strike at least since 1906. UK tradition has inspired the International Labour Organization Convention 87 (1948) articles 3 and 10, the case law of the European Court of Human Rights under article 11, and the EU Charter of Fundamental Rights article 28. However, the scope of the right to take collective action has been controversial. Reflecting a series of restrictions from 1979 to 1997, the law was partially codified in the Trade Union and Labour Relations (Consolidation) Act 1992 sections 219 to 246, which now falls below international standards.

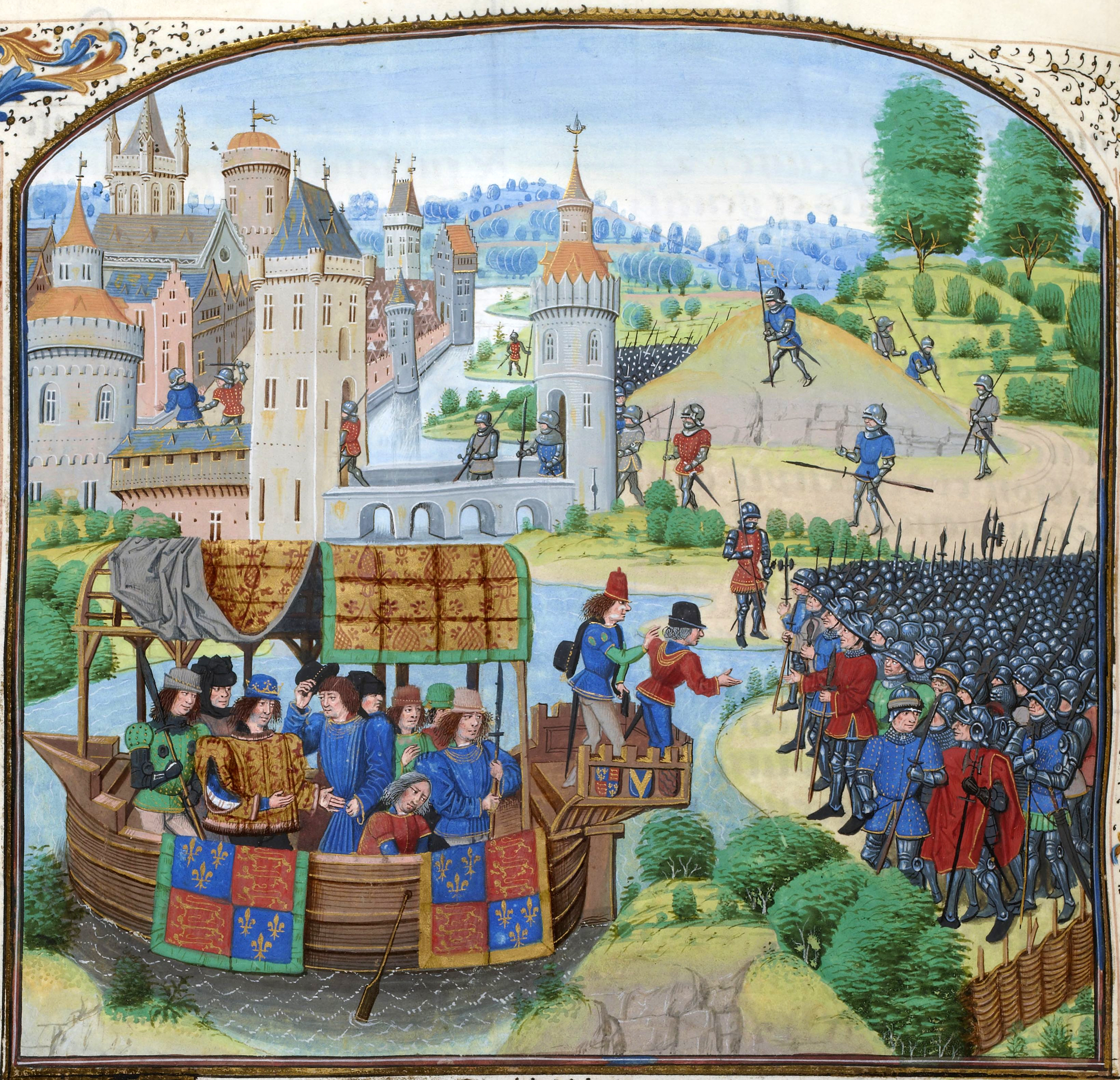
The right to strike, used throughout history like in the Peasants' Revolt of 1381, is a fundamental right in every democracy. TULRCA 1992 sets limits which have been found by the International Labour Organization to violate international standards.

There is no consensus about the status of the right to strike at common law. On the one hand, the House of Lords and the Court of Appeal has repeatedly affirmed that "to cease work except for higher wages, and a strike in consequence, was lawful at common law", that "right of workmen to strike is an essential element in the principle of collective bargaining", "that workmen have a right to strike", and that this is "a fundamental human right". This view would accord with international law, and see the right to stop work in a good faith trade dispute as an implied term in every employment contract. On the other hand, differently composed courts have asserted that the common law position sits at odds with international law: that a strike is a breach of contract, and this creates tortious liability for unions organising collective action, unless it falls within an immunity from statute. On this view, even though an employer is not liable for economic loss to workers who are collectively dismissed, a union could be liable to the employer for taking collective action. Economic torts have been said to include conspiracy to injure, inducement of breach of contract, and tortious interference with a contract. However, TULRCA 1992 section 219 contains the classic formula, (Note: This was introduced by the Conspiracy and Protection of Property Act 1875 and repeated in the Trade Disputes Act 1906.) that collective action by a trade union becomes immune from any liability in tort if done "in contemplation or furtherance of a trade dispute". This said, various further hurdles must be jumped for a union to be certain of immunity from employers suing for damages, or an injunction to stop a strike.

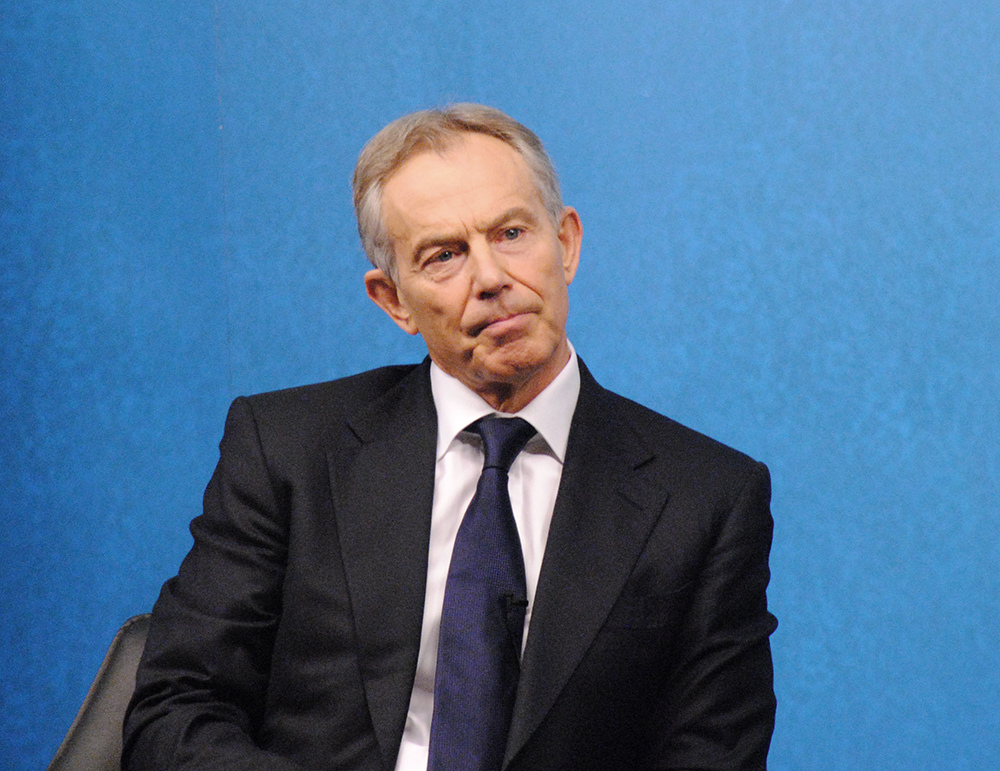
Tony Blair, New Labour Prime Minister from 1997 to 2007, said in 1997 that "changes that we do propose would leave British law the most restrictive on trade unions in the Western world." This is still seen as accurate.

First, the meaning of a "trade dispute" under TULRCA 1992 section 244 is confined to mean a dispute "between workers and their employer" and must mainly relate to employment terms. In BBC v Hearn Lord Denning MR granted an injunction against a strike by BBC staff to stop broadcast of the 1977 FA Cup Final to apartheid South Africa. He reasoned that this was a political dispute, not a "trade dispute", unless the union was requesting "putting a clause in the contract" to not do such work. Strikes against government legislation (rather than an employer), or privatisation, or outsourcing before it happens, have been held unlawful. However, at the least, any dispute over the terms or conditions on which workers do their jobs will allow protection. Second, TULRCA 1992 section 224 prevents collective action against someone who is "not the employer party to the dispute". "Secondary action" used to be lawful, from the Trade Union Act 1871 until 1927, and again from 1946 till 1980, but today it is not. This makes the definition of "employer" relevant, particularly where a trade dispute involves a company group. A worker's written statement of the contract may purport to say that the only "employer" is a subsidiary, although the parent company carries out the employer's function of ultimately setting the contractual terms and conditions. Further, any picketing or protest outside a workplace must be "peaceful" and there must be a picket supervisor. There are a limited number of outright prohibitions on strike action, but in accordance with ILO Convention 87 this is only for workplaces that involve the truly essential functions of the state (for armed forces, police, (Note: Police Act 1996 s 91 (England and Wales), The Police and Fire Reform (Scotland) Act 2012 (Consequential Provisions and Modifications) Order 2013 article 9 (Scotland), Police (Northern Ireland) Act 1998 s 68 (Northern Ireland).) and prison officers (Note: Anomalously, the Merchant Shipping Act 1995 s 59 grants a further exception.)), and only when impartial arbitration is used as an alternative.

Third, under TULRCA 1992 section 226 a union wishing to take collective action for a trade dispute must conduct a ballot. In summary, the union must give 7 days notice to the employer about holding a ballot, state the categories of employees being balloted, give a total number, all "as accurate as is reasonably practicable in the light of the information". Since the Trade Union Act 2016, there is an additional requirement that a ballot has a 50% turnout for a strike to be supported, and a total of 40% of voters supporting a strike (i.e. an 80% turnout if the vote is evenly split) in "important public services" that include health services, schools, fire, transport, nuclear and border security. A scrutineer must be able to oversee the conduct, the vote must be given to all workers who could strike, the vote must be secret and by post, allowing for 'small accidental failures' which are 'unlikely to affect the result of the ballot'. The union must inform the employer of the result "as soon as reasonably practicable", call action within four weeks, and tell the employer of the people taking part. The rules are poorly drafted, and this has generated litigation where some courts allowed injunctions on ostensible technical glitches. However, the Court of Appeal since emphasised in British Airways Plc v Unite the Union (No 2) and RMT v Serco Ltd that the rules are to be interpreted consistently with the purpose of reconciling the equally legitimate, but conflicting interests of employers and unions. No employee can be dismissed for taking part in a strike for a period of 12 weeks, so long as the strike is officially endorsed by the union. However, if strikes are not conducted in accordance with law, employers can (and often do) go to court to seek an injunction against a union conducting the strike, or potentially damages. A court should not grant any injunction against a strike unless there is a 'serious question to be tried' and it must consider where the 'balance of convenience lies'. In The Nawala the House of Lords stressed that injunctions should be granted rarely and give 'full weight to all the practical realities' and the fact that a court should not end the strike in the employer's favour.

=== Information and consultation ===
While rights to take collective action, including strikes, are fundamental to democratic and civilised society, the UK has introduced a growing menu of collective rights to have a "voice at work" without a need for protest. "Information and consultation" are usually seen as precursors to actual participation rights, through binding votes at work. The economic benefit is that directors or decision-makers who inform and consult staff on important workplace changes (e.g. redundancies) think harder, and see alternatives with fewer costs for the enterprise, taxpayers, and staff. Information and consultation rights have historically derived from collective bargaining models. The Trade Union and Labour Relations (Consolidation) Act 1992 sections 181-182 require employers on a union's written request to disclose information, without which collective bargaining could be materially impeded, according to "good industrial relations practice". The Companies Act 2006 section 417-419 also requires disclosure of information in a director's report each financial year on how companies "have regard" to "the interests of the company's employees" and "business relationships with suppliers" down the supply chain. General consultation rights existed in the UK with collective bargaining since the Whitley Councils from 1918. A general consultation right is now codified in the Charter of Fundamental Rights of the European Union, article 27. The Court of Justice held this was not directly binding, but specific rules apply in four main contexts: in general work councils, transnational work councils, for collective redundancies, transfers of undertakings, and health and safety.

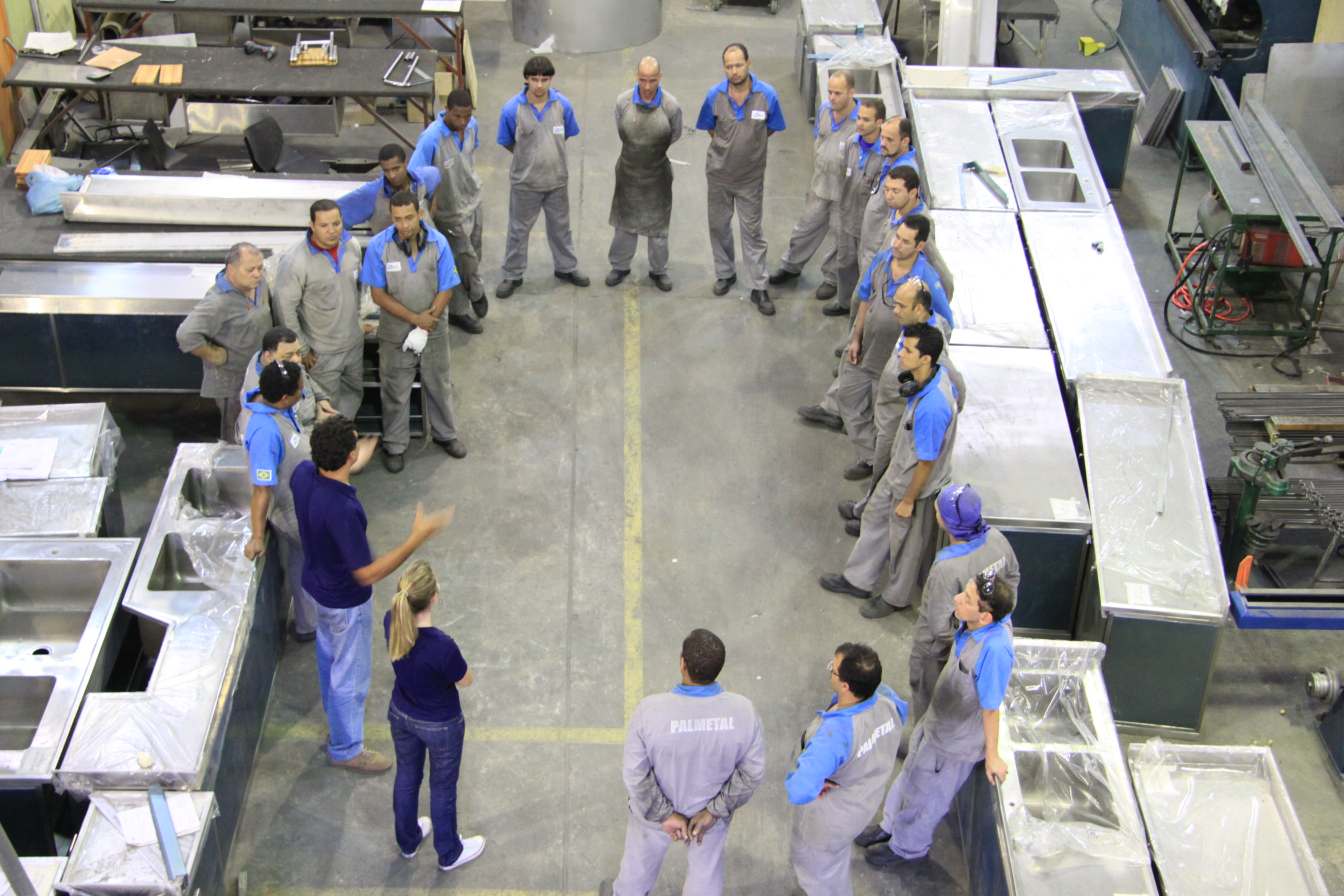
Every UK company with over 50 people has a right to elect a work council which management must inform and consult before major workplace changes. Staff who work for companies that operate in two or more EU countries have a right to start a transnational work council.

First, the Information and Consultation of Employees Regulations 2004, require undertakings with 50 or more employees to inform and consult on probable developments in the enterprise, changes to job structures, and contract changes - especially redundancies. Employees must voluntarily initiate an "information and consultation procedure". If they do, but employers cannot find a negotiated agreement, a "standard procedure" model requires between 2 and 25 elected employee representatives having the right to be consulted on an ongoing basis: that is, an elected work council. A negotiated agreement can cover more issues than the model (for instance, to integrate health and safety issues in one council) if the parties choose. Crucially, consultation is not merely an exercise in management telling staff about their decisions, but requires meaningful dialogue "with a view to reaching an agreement". This is "an obligation to negotiate", similar to a duty to bargain in good faith. To start a procedure, at least 15 employees or 10 per cent of staff (whichever is higher) can request it. Occasionally, there could be a "pre-existing" council, or procedure in writing, covering all employees. If so, if it is not as good as the new method requested, and if the employer wants to keep it that way, a ballot must be held where over 50 per cent of staff favour a new procedure. For example, in Stewart v Moray Council, after 500 teachers requested a new procedure (over 10 per cent of staff, but under 40 per cent), the employer argued that a ballot had to be held, because the existing collective agreement with the union had a protocol on information and consultation. The Employment Appeal Tribunal, rejecting the employer's claim, held the pre-existing procedure was not good enough to force a ballot, because it did not explain how the views of staff would be sought. Employer currently face penalties up to £75,000 for failure to comply with the rules, though it is far from clear this is sufficient to ensure an "effective remedy" under EU law.

Second, the Transnational Information and Consultation of Employees Regulations 1999 enable unified work councils in multinational enterprises, operating in the EU. This is most likely for US multinational enterprises. In "community scale undertakings" or corporate "groups" with over 1000 employees, and 150 employees in two or more member states, employees have a right to a transnational work council to consult on any "probable trend of employment, investments, and substantial changes... introduction of new working methods or production processes... and collective redundancies." A "group" of undertakings exists when one undertaking has a "dominant influence" over another, for instance through company share ownership or rights to appoint or remove directors. Other features of transnational work councils are similar to the Information and Consultation of Employees Regulations 2004. Management can initiate a work council, or 100 employees in at least two undertakings and member states can make a request. Then, a "special negotiating body" (elected worker representative and management) will try to seek an agreement on the terms. If agreement cannot be reached, a template set of "subsidiary requirements" will form the work council's constitution. The rules have been criticised for not going further, or being integrated with other consultation laws, although every member state in the EU is able to go beyond the minimum standards laid down.

Third, the Trade Union and Labour Relations (Consolidation) Act 1992 section 188 requires employers, who are "contemplating" redundancies of 20 employees, in an "establishment" over 90 days, to consult for 30 days with the workforce. "Redundancy" is an economic dismissal "not related to the individual concerned" (e.g. for poor work or misconduct). In University of Stirling v UCU the Supreme Court held that expiry of fixed term contracts, for 140 University teaching staff, did not count as a reason "related to the individual", and so staff should have been consulted. An "establishment" includes "a distinct entity that is ordinarily permanent, entrusted with performing specified tasks, namely primarily the sale of goods, and which has, to that end, several workers, technical means and an organisational structure in that the store is an individual cost centre managed by a manager." In Lyttle v Bluebird UK Bidco 2 Ltd, the Court of Justice held this meant that Woolworths shops in Northern Ireland, each with under 20 employees, could claim to be separate establishments. More doubtfully, it was held by the Employment Appeal Tribunal in E Green & Sons (Castings) Ltd v ASTMS that three companies, all operating from the same premises, were different establishments even though they were part of the same group. There is considerable disagreement over when an employing entity must begin consulting: the Directive says when decision-makers are "contemplating", while the Regulations say "proposes". In AEK ry v Fujitsu Siemens Computers Oy the Court of Justice held consulting must begin "once a strategic or commercial decision compelling him to contemplate or to plan for collective redundancies has been taken." In groups of companies, where a parent controls the subsidiary, the duty to perform the consulting process falls on the subsidiary, but the duty begins as soon as the parent has contemplated that a particular subsidiary "has been identified" for redundancies for consulting "to have any meaning". Consultation should take place with the recognised trade union first, but if there is none, then elected employee representatives, if necessary giving enough time to organise an election. Section 188(7) says that an employer has a "defence" for not consulting if there are "exceptional circumstances", but this "exception" is not in the Directive, and courts have avoided applying it. Dismissals cannot take effect until meaningful negotiation has taken place. If employers fail to negotiate, they must pay a "protective award" of up to 90 days' pay to each employee. Essentially similar rules apply for consultation with staff before any transfer of an undertaking.

=== Votes at work ===
Rights of staff to vote for governing boards and bodies in UK enterprises, whether corporations, partnerships or other statutory entities, have an established history in the UK. They remain today in institutions such as universities, NHS hospitals, and many workplaces organised as partnerships. Since the turn of the 20th century Acts such as the Port of London Act 1908, Iron and Steel Act 1967, or the Post Office Act 1977 required all workers in those specific companies had votes to elect directors on the board, meaning the UK had some of the first "codetermination" laws in the world. However, as many of those Acts were updated, the Companies Act 2006 today still has no general requirement for workers to vote in the general meeting to elect directors, meaning corporate governance remains monopolised by shareholding institutions or asset managers. By contrast in 16 out of 27 EU member states employees have participation rights in private companies, including the election of members of the boards of directors, and binding votes on decisions about individual employment rights, like dismissals, working time and social facilities or accommodation. At board level, UK company law in principle allows any measure of employee participation, alongside shareholders, but voluntary measures have been rare outside employee share schemes that usually carry very little voice and increase employees' financial risk. The Companies Act 2006 section 168 defines only "members" as those with participation rights. Under section 112 a "member" is anybody who initially subscribes their name to the company memorandum, or is later entered on the members' register, and is not required to have contributed money as opposed to, for instance, work. Moreover, under the European Company Statute, businesses that reincorporate as a Societas Europaea may opt to follow the Directive for employee involvement. An SE may have a two-tiered board, as in German companies, where shareholders and employees elect a supervisory board that in turn appoints a management board responsible for day-to-day running of the company. Or an SE can have a one tiered board, as every UK company, and employees and shareholders may elect board members in the desired proportion. An "SE" can have no fewer employee participation rights than what existed before, but for a UK company, there is likely to have been no participation in any case.

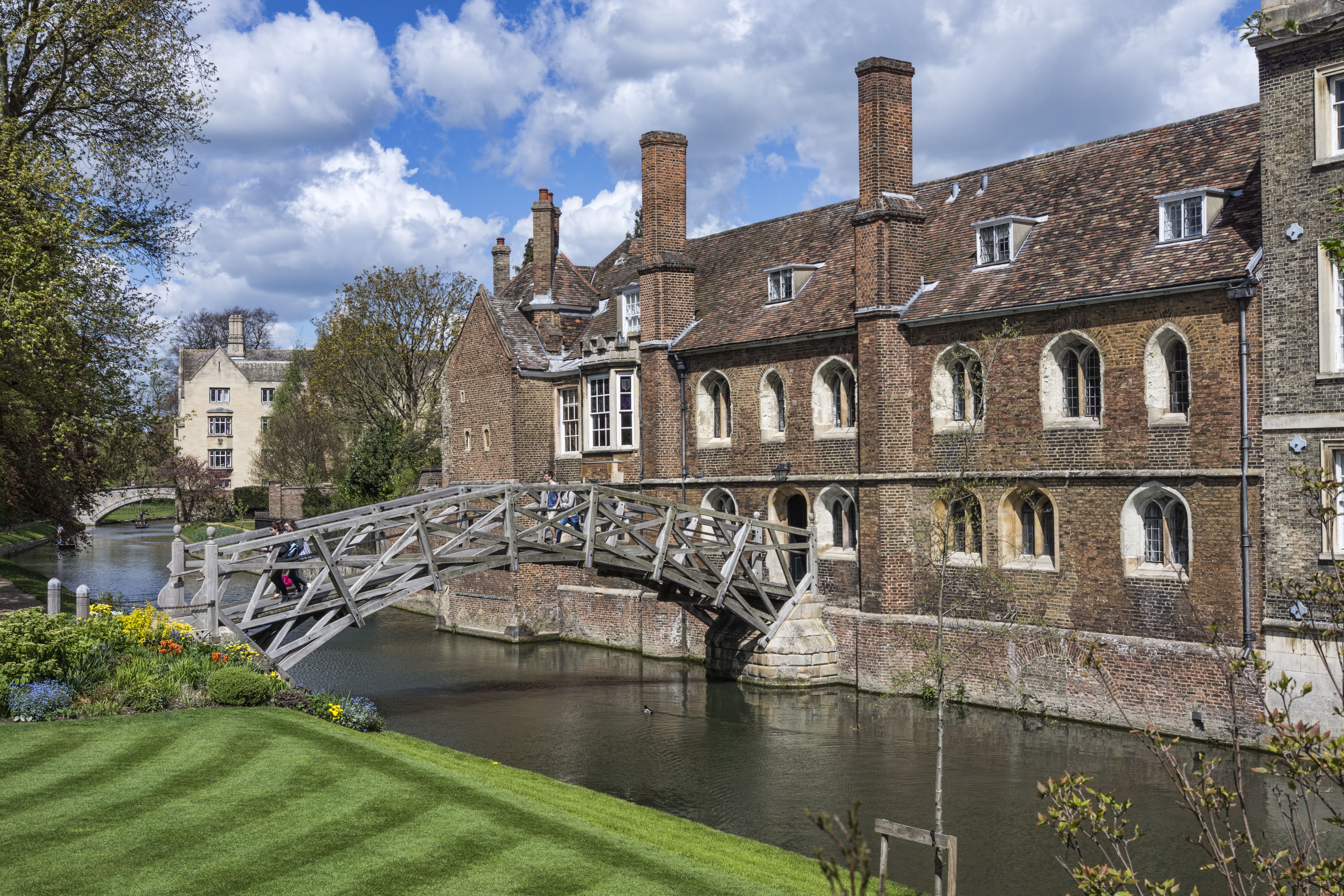
Universities in the UK are generally required to give staff members a right to vote for the board of managers at the head of corporate governance, such as in the Oxford University Act 1854, or the Cambridge University Act 1856.

In the 1977 Report of the committee of inquiry on industrial democracy the Government proposed, in line with the new German Codetermination Act 1976, and mirroring an EU Draft Fifth Company Law Directive, that the board of directors should have an equal number of representatives elected by employees as there were for shareholders. But reform stalled, and was abandoned after the 1979 election. Despite successful businesses like the John Lewis Partnership and Waitrose that are wholly managed and owned by the workforce, voluntary granting of participation is rare. Many businesses run employee share schemes, particularly for highly paid employees; however, such shares seldom compose more than a small percentage of capital in the company, and these investments entail heavy risks for workers, given the lack of diversification.

Another form of direct participation rights is for employees to exercise voting rights over specific workplace issues. The primary example is the Pensions Act 2004 sections 241-243 state employees must be able to elect a minimum of one third of the management of their occupational schemes, as "member nominated trustees". This gives employees the ability, in principle to have a voice on how their pension money is invested in company shares, and also how the voting power attached to company shares is used. There have, at the initiative of the European Union been a growing number of "work councils" and "information and consultation committees", but unless an employer voluntarily concedes to staff having a binding say, there is no legal right to participate in specific questions of workplace policy. Participation at work is limited to information, consultation, collective bargaining and industrial action.

== Equality ==
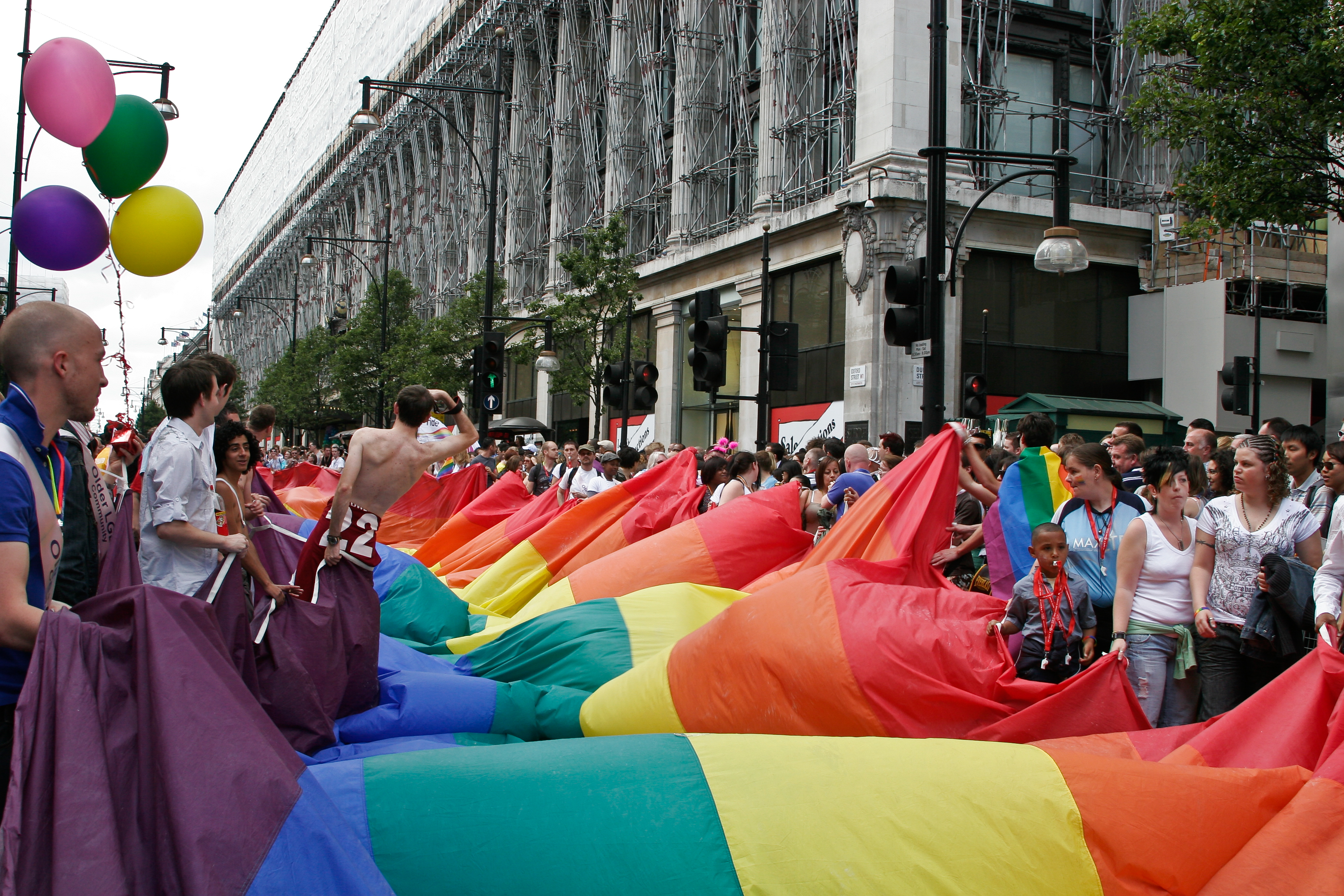
The Equality Act 2010 protects against discrimination on grounds of race, gender, belief, disability, age, and sexual orientation.

The Equality Act 2010 embodies the principle that people should treat one another according to the content of their character, and not another irrelevant status, to foster social inclusion. This principle is found in the common law, and EU law, There is an absolute prohibition on discriminating against trade union members, and the EA 2010 protects the characteristics of gender (including pregnancy), race, sexual orientation (including marital status), belief, disability and age. Atypical workers, who have part-time, fixed-term, or agency contracts, are also protected under specific regulations. The common law may also give greater protection to workers who are treated arbitrarily. "Direct" discrimination is when a worker is treated less favourably because of a protected characteristic (e.g. gender or race) compared to another person (with a different gender or race), unless employers can show that a person's characteristic is a "genuine occupational requirement". "Indirect" discrimination is when employers apply a neutral rule to all workers, but this has "disparate impact" on people with a particular protected characteristic, and the rule cannot be "objectively justified". Equal pay claims between men and women have historically been separate in law, the rules are often less favourable, and do not tackle structural discrimination such as unequal parental leave and responsibility. Workers have a right to not suffer harassment at work. Claimants may not be victimised for bringing a discrimination claim. The law requires employers to make reasonable adjustments to include disabled people at work. The law also allows positive action to include underrepresented groups if a candidate is equally qualified. If discrimination is proven, it is a statutory tort, and employers are vicariously and potentially personally liable.

=== Direct discrimination ===
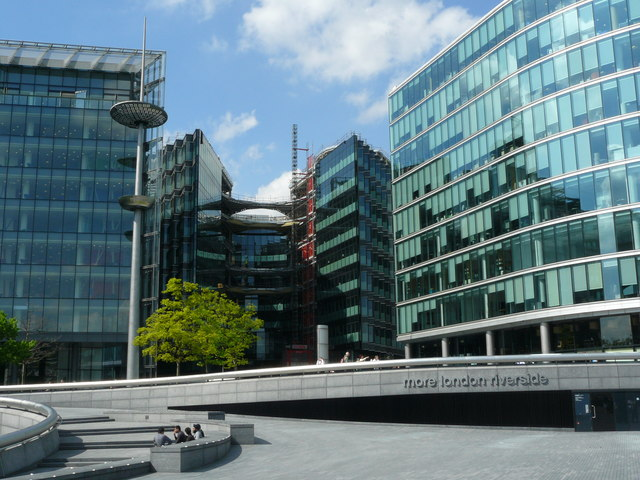
Under the Equality Act 2006, the Equality and Human Rights Commission, with offices near City Hall, London, promotes equality by intervening in discrimination cases, providing guidance and making investigations into workplace practices.

Direct discrimination is prohibited by the Equality Act 2010, and means treating a person less favourably than a comparable person, because of a "protected characteristic", such as sex, race, sexual orientation, disability or age. The employer's motives are irrelevant, even if it meant to help underprivileged groups. An appropriate comparator is one who is the same in all respects except for the characteristic. In Shamoon v Chief Constable of the Royal Ulster Constabulary a chief inspector claimed the police force was responsible for sex discrimination, and she pointed to male chief inspectors who had not been treated unfavourably. The House of Lords, controversially, overturned a Tribunal finding of sex discrimination because colleagues had complained about how Ms Shamoon had performed appraisals, and her chosen comparators had not received complaints. A claimant may allege they were treated less favourably than a hypothetical person would have been, and does not need to point to an actual comparator. If the claimant shows a set of facts from which a reasonable tribunal could conclude there was discrimination, the burden of proof is on the employer to show there was no discrimination. It is irrelevant whether the person who was targeted themselves has the protected characteristic. For example, in Coleman v Attridge Law a lady with a disabled child was abused by her employer for taking time off to care for the child. Even though Ms Coleman was not disabled, she could claim disability discrimination. Similarly, in English v Sanderson Blinds Ltd, a man who was from Brighton and went to boarding school was teased for being gay. Even though he was married with children, he successfully claimed discrimination on grounds of sexual orientation. An instruction by an employer to discriminate against customers or anyone else also violates the law.

Under EA 2010 Schedule 9, an employer may escape liability if they show a "genuine occupational requirement". An otherwise discriminatory practice must pursue a legitimate aim by the job's nature (not the employer's business needs generally) and the practice must be proportionate. In Etam plc v Rowan a man was turned down for a job at a woman's clothing store, with the excuse that a man should not operate women's change rooms. But this did not count as a genuine occupational requirement because the shift allocation could have been easily changed. By contrast, it was held in Wolf v Stadt Frankfurt am Main that a requirement to be under 30 years old when joining the fire service could be a genuine occupational requirement, to ensure fitness. Controversially, the European Court of Justice has repeatedly said that it is within a member state's margin of discretion to say being male is a genuine occupational requirement for work in the military. This was even so, in Sirdar v The Army Board & Secretary of State for Defence, for a lady who applied to work as a chef in the Royal Marines, because the policy on "interoperability" meant every member had to be capable of combat. Cases involving religion are subject to a special provision, so that if a job's functions require adherence to an organisation's ethos, the organisation has an exemption from direct discrimination. In an action for judicial review of the legislation, Richards J rejected that a faith school would be exempt in any way, rather than an actual religious establishment like a church. Even there, it was rejected that a gay person could be dismissed from a job as a cleaner or bookshop worker, if that was incompatible with the religious "ethos", because the ethos would not be a genuine requirement to carry out the job. Direct age discrimination can be objectively justified more easily.

Harassment is an independent tort which requires no comparator. The Protection from Harassment Act 1997, and now the Equality Act 2010 sections 26 and 40, define harassment as where a person's dignity is violated, or the person is subject to an intimidating, hostile, degrading, humiliating or offensive environment. An employer will be liable for its own conduct, but also conduct of employees, or customers if this happens on 2 or more occasions and the employer could be reasonably expected to have intervened. In a straightforward case, in Majrowski v Guy's and St Thomas' NHS Trust a gay man was ostracised and bossed about by his supervisor from the very start of his work as a clinical audit co-ordinator. The House of Lords held the laws create a statutory tort, for which (unless a statute says otherwise) an employer is automatically vicariously liable. Under the Equality Act 2010 section 27, an employer must also ensure that once a complaint is brought by a worker, even if it ultimately proves to be unfounded, that worker should not be victimised. This means the worker should not be subject to anything that a reasonable person would perceive as detrimental. In St Helen's MBC v Derbyshire the House of Lords held a council victimised female staff who were pursuing an equal pay claim when it sent letters warning (without much factual basis) that if the claim went ahead, the council would be forced to cut school dinners and make redundancies. Because it attempted to make the workers feel guilty, a reasonable person would have regarded this as a detriment. By contrast, in Chief Constable of West Yorkshire Police v Khan, a sergeant with a pending race discrimination claim was denied a reference by the employer that he was suing. The House of Lords held this could not be considered victimisation because the Constabulary was only seeking to protect its legitimate interests by not giving a reference, so as to not prejudice its own future case in the discrimination hearings. Harassment and victimisation cannot be justified.

=== Indirect discrimination ===
"Indirect" discrimination means an employer, without an objective justification, applies a neutral rule to all employees, but it puts one group at a particular disadvantage. However, the particular disadvantage is irrelevant if it involves a discriminatory state of mine. In Ladele v Islington LBC a woman who refused to register gay civil partners, because she said her Christianity made her conclude homosexuality was wrong, was dismissed for not carrying out her duties. Lord Neuberger MR held that she was not unlawfully discriminated against because the Council was objectively justified in following its equality policy: that everyone working in marriage or partnership registries had to register everybody equally. The European Court of Human Rights upheld this decision. By contrast, in Eweida v British Airways plc a lady who wished to wear a cross claimed that BA's instruction to remove it was indirectly discriminatory against Christians. Although the English Court of Appeal held crucifix jewellery is not an essential part of the Christian religion, the ECHR found that, under the reasonableness limb of the proportionality test, it was an illegitimate interference with Ms Eweida's religious beliefs under ECHR article 9. British Airways changed its uniform policy shortly afterwards in any case, and this indicated that they had acted unlawfully. The question of particular disadvantage also typically relies on evidence of statistical impact between groups. For instance in Bilka-Kaufhaus GmbH v Weber von Hartz an employer set up pensions only for full-time workers, and not for part-time workers. But 72 per cent of part-time workers were women. So Frau Weber von Hartz was able to show that this rule put her, and women generally, at a particular disadvantage, and it was up to the employer to show there was an objective justification. Statistics might be presented in a misleading way (e.g. a measure could affect twice as many women as men, but that is only because there is 2 women and 1 man affected in a workforce of 100). Accordingly, the correct approach is to show how many people in the affected workforce group are put at an advantage, and then if there is a statistically significant number of people with a protected characteristic who are not advantaged, there must be an objective justification for the practice. In R (Seymour-Smith) v Secretary of State for Employment the UK government's former rules on unfair dismissal were alleged to be discriminatory. Between 1985 and 1999, the government had made the law so that people had to work for 2 years before they qualified for unfair dismissal, and this meant that there was a 4 to 8 per cent disparity between the number of men and women who qualified on dismissal for a tribunal claim. Following ECJ guidance, the House of Lords held by a majority that this was a large enough disparity in coverage, which required justification by the government.

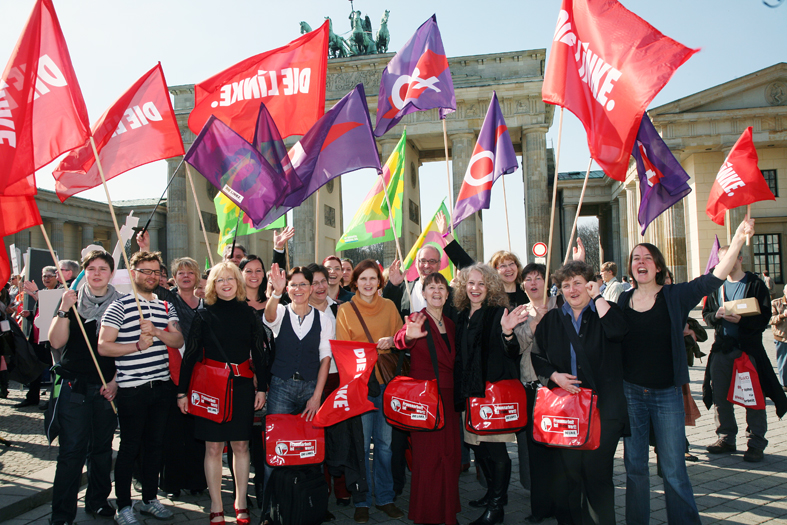
People celebrate "Equal Pay Day" in Berlin. The Equal Treatment Directive, which the Equality Act 2010 sections 64 to 71 follow, covers everyone in the EU, but the law so far has let the gender pay gap persist.

A significant exception to the basic framework for indirect discrimination is found for the issue of equal pay between men and women. Because the Equal Pay Act 1970 preceded other legislation, and so did the TFEU article 157, there has always been a separate body of rules. It is not entirely clear why this should continue, particularly because in several respects it is harder to bring equal pay claims on grounds of gender than for other protected characteristics, meaning that the task of closing the gender pay gap is frustrated compared to race, sexual orientation or other grounds. First, a claim must relate to "pay", concept which is generally construed widely to encompass any kind of remuneration for work, as well as sick pay or for maternity leave. Second, under the EA 2010 section 79, a comparator must be real, and employed by the same employer, or an associated employer, and at the same establishment, or a different establishment if common terms apply. It is usually harder to find a real comparator than imagine a hypothetical one. Third, under EA 2010 section 65, the claimant must be doing "broadly similar" work to the comparator, or work "rated as equivalent", or work which is of "equal value". These criteria, which at their broadest focus on the "value" of labour, make explicit what a court must take into account, but also potentially constrain the court in a way that the open ended test for indirect discrimination does not. Fourth, under section 128 there is a time limit of six months to bring a claim, but unlike the three-month time limit for other discrimination claims it cannot be extended at the court's discretion. However, equal pay claims do import an "equality clause" into the claimant's contract of employment. This allows a claim to be pursued in the High Court as well as a Tribunal. It is unclear what principle justifies the segregation of unequal pay claims based on sex, compared to all other protected characteristics.

In 2014, the gender pay gap in the EU averaged men being paid 16.2% more than women, and the UK's gap was higher than average, at 18.3%.

Indirect discrimination may be "objectively justified" if a neutral practice puts a member of a group at a particular disadvantage. In most cases, this is based on business necessity. The ECJ, mostly in cases concerning sex discrimination under TFEU art 157, has held that an employer must show a "real need" for the practice that has a disparate impact, and it must be "unrelated" to the protected characteristic. The justification should not involve "generalisations" rather than reasons specific to the workers in question, and budgetary considerations alone are not to be considered an "aim". Many foundational judgments concerned employers who gave fewer benefits to part-time staff than full-time staff. Given the particular disadvantage this caused women it was hard to justify. In domestic equal pay claims based on gender, instead of "objective justification", the old terminology still used is that there must be a "genuine material factor", found in EA 2010 section 69. Despite different headings, the same underlying concepts are present as for objective justification, with the need to show a "legitimate aim" and that action is "proportionate" to such an aim. In Clay Cross (Quarry Services) Ltd v Fletcher Lord Denning MR held that an employer could not justify paying a young man a higher wage than an older lady (who in fact trained him) on the basis that this was what the employer had to pay given the state of the job market. However, in Rainey v Greater Glasgow Health Board the House of Lords held that women NHS prosthetists who were paid 40% less than men prosthetists, who had become contracted through private practices, had no claim because it was agreed that such higher prices were necessary to attract their services. Thus, the "objective justification" was said to be an organisational necessity. In Enderby v Frenchay Health Authority the ECJ held that although a speech therapist being paid less than a male counterpart could not be justified only on the ground that this resulted from different collective agreements, if a disparity came from market forces, this was an objective justification. It has, however, been emphasised that the legislation's purpose is to achieve equal pay, and not fair wages. So in Strathclyde RC v Wallace the House of Lords held that women teachers who had to fill in for an absent male head master were not entitled to be paid the same during that time. This was a different job. It has also been asserted that collective agreements designed to incrementally make a transition to equal pay between jobs rated as equivalent cannot be justified, and can even result in liability for the union that concluded them. Unlike other protected characteristics, under EA 2010 section 13(2), direct age discrimination is open to justification on the same principles, on the basis that everyone will go through the ageing process. This has meant, primarily, that older workers can reach a compulsory retirement age set either by the workplace or the government, on the basis that it is a legitimate way of sharing work between generations.

=== Disability and positive action ===
Because treating people equally is not by itself enough to achieve equality for everyone, the law requires that employers owe positive duties to disabled people to give preferential treatment. According to Chacón Navas v Eurest Colectividades SA disabilities involve an impairment "which hinders the participation of the person concerned in professional life". This includes all varieties of mental and physical disabilities. Because treating disabled people equally based on ability to perform tasks could easily result in persistence of exclusion from the workforce, employers are bound to do as much as reasonably possible to ensure participation is not hindered in practice. Under the Equality Act 2010 sections 20 to 22, employers have to make "reasonable adjustments". For example, employers may have to change physical features of a workplace, or provide auxiliary aids to work, or adjust their working habits and expectations. In effect, the law views society as being the cause of the "disability" if it fails to ensure people are accommodated, rather than seeing the person's handicap as being merely a personal misfortune. EA 2010 Schedule 8 lists more examples of reasonable adjustments, and the Equality and Human Rights Commission provides guidance. In the leading case, Archibald v Fife Council, it was held that the council had a duty to exempt a lady from competitive interviews for a new job. Archibald, previously a road sweeper, had lost the ability to walk after complications in surgery. Despite over 100 applications for grades just above a manual worker, in her submission, the employers were fixated on her past history as a sweeper. The House of Lords held it could be appropriate, before such an ordeal, for a worker to fill an existing vacancy without a standard interview procedure. By contrast, in O'Hanlon v Revenue and Customs Commissioners the Court of Appeal rejected that it would be a reasonable adjustment, as Ms O'Hanlon was requesting after falling into clinical depression, for an employer to increase sick pay to full pay, after the expiry of a six-month period that applied to everyone else. The aim is always to ensure that disabilities are not a barrier to full participation in working life, as much as possible.

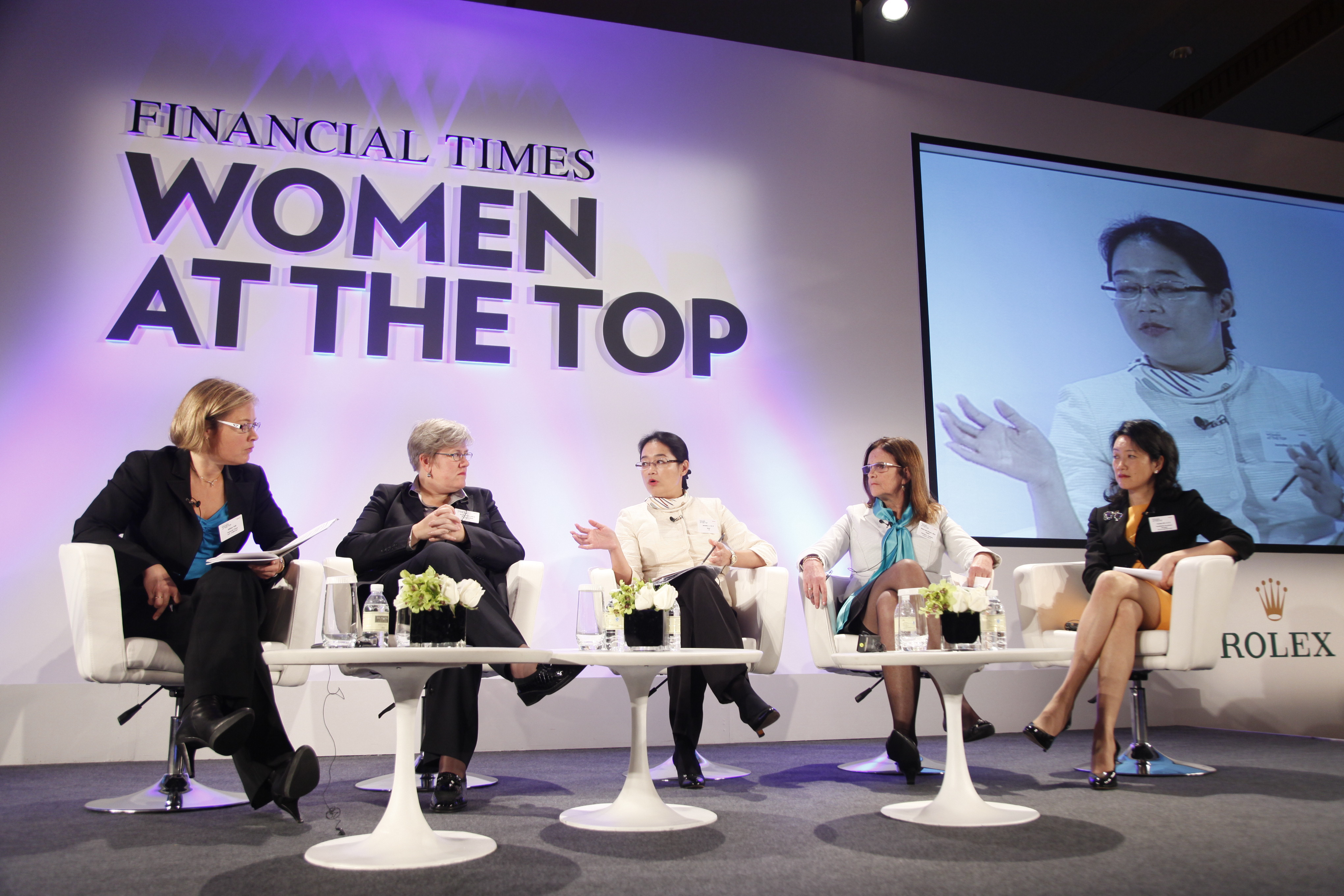
An increasing number of EU member states, though not yet the UK, require company boards of directors to have gender quotas. For example, Finland requires that companies comply with the standard of a 50-50 gender split, or explain to the market if they do not reach the target.

For characteristics other than disability, "hard" positive discrimination, through privileged contract terms, hiring and firing based on gender, race, sexuality, belief or age, or setting quotas for underrepresented groups in most jobs, is generally unlawful in the EU. This policy, however, leaves open the issue of historical disadvantage, and sub-conscious exclusion, which may not be addressed through ordinary direct and indirect discrimination claims. The EU has permitted "soft" positive action, in contrast to the United States or South Africa, where "affirmative action" operates in many workplaces. Lawful positive action in the EU means, in the case of hiring candidates for work, employers may select someone from an under-represented group, but only if that person has qualifications equal to competitors, with full consideration of the candidate's individual qualities. In Marschall v Land Nordrhein Westfalen a male teacher failed to get a promotion, and a woman did. He complained that the school's policy, to promote women "unless reasons specific to an individual candidate tilt the balance in his favour", was unlawful. The ECJ held the school would not be acting unlawfully if it did in fact follow its policy. By contrast in Abrahamsson and Anderson v Fogelqvist University of Gothenburg's policy was to hire a woman candidate unless "the difference between the candidates' qualification is so great that such application would give rise to a breach of the requirement of objectivity". A male candidate, who was not hired over two less qualified women, was successful in claiming discrimination. In addition, according to Re Badeck's application legitimate positive action measures include quotas in temporary positions, in training, guaranteeing interviews to people with sufficient qualifications, and quotas for people working on representative, administrative or supervisory bodies such as a company's board of directors. This approach, developed initially in ECJ case law, is now reflected in the Treaty on the Functioning of the European Union article 157(4) and was put into UK law in the Equality Act 2010 sections 157-158.

=== Atypical work ===
Beyond the Equality Act 2010 three EU directives, and UK Regulations, require minimum levels of equal treatment for people with part-time, fixed-term or agency work contracts, compared to people with more permanent or full-time jobs. Many people choose atypical work patterns to balance family or social commitments, but many are also in precarious work, where they lack the bargaining power to get better terms. However, the requirements for equal treatment are not uniform, and are often limited. The Part-time Workers (Prevention of Less Favourable Treatment) Regulations 2000 state that a part-time worker cannot be treated less favourably than a comparable full-time worker. However (like for age) an employer may objectively justify less favourable treatment for both direct and indirect discrimination. Moreover, (similar to equal pay rules) under regulation 2(4) a worker can only compare themselves to real full-time workers who work under the "same type of contract" doing "broadly similar work", and are in the same establishment, or under a common collective agreement. In Matthews v Kent and Medway Fire Authority, the House of Lords held that even though part-time firefighters did not do administrative work, their contracts were still broadly similar to the full-time firefighters. In O'Brien v Ministry of Justice the Supreme Court also rejected that giving part-time judges no pension pro rata was unlawful, and had no objective justification. Although the Ministry argued that it was legitimate to save money, and to recruit quality full-time judges with a pension, Lord Hope and Lady Hale emphasised that budgetary considerations are not relevant, and it was necessary to recruit good part-time staff also. But although rights are strong in law to counteract people being treated differently in the same workplace, part-time workers across the UK economy remain underpaid compared to full-time workers as a whole. Workplaces tend to be structurally segregated, so many jobs, often where women are working, are all part-time while better paying jobs tend to be full-time.

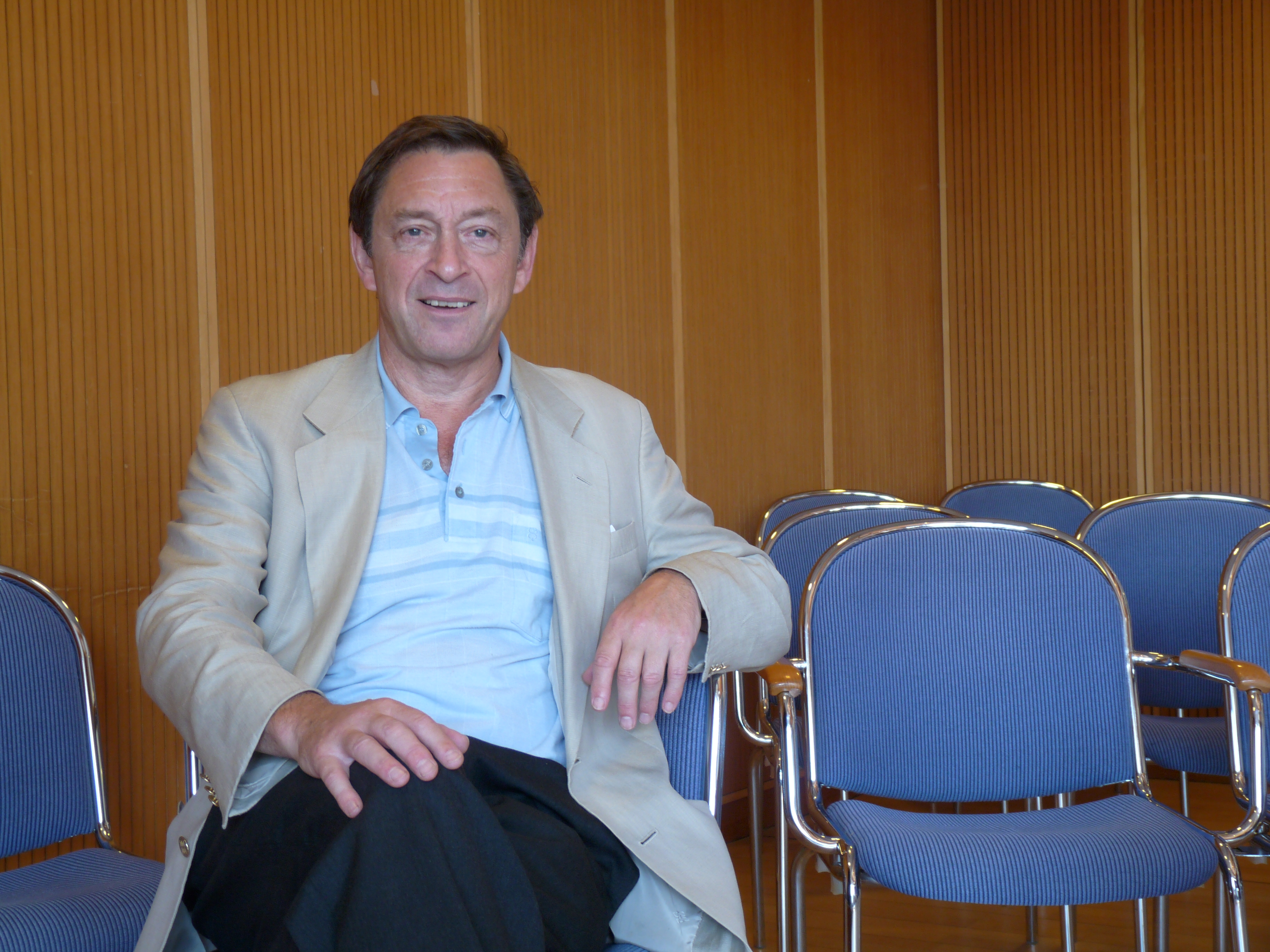
Atypical workers, with people who lost social security and fair incomes, were named the "precariat" class by former ILO director Guy Standing. He advocates a universal basic income to ensure security, funded through tax on wealth.

The Fixed-Term Employees (Prevention of Less Favourable Treatment) Regulations 2002 cover people with contracts that purport to last for a limited duration. The Regulations (unlike the Directive appears to require) were written to only cover "employees" and not the broader group of "workers". In contrast, the European Court of Justice held in Mangold v Helm that equality was a general principle of EU law. This meant that a German Act which required fixed-term contracts be objectively justified after two years work, but gave no protection to workers beyond the age of 52, was unlawful. Likewise, the UK Regulations ban less favourable treatment of fixed-term staff without objective justification. Less generous than other countries, regulation 8 says if an employee has a succession of fixed term contracts lasting over 4 years, the employee is to be treated as having a permanent contract. In practice, UK law already regulated fixed-term work in this respect, because the qualifying period for unfair dismissal will be met even if an employee has had short breaks in employment.

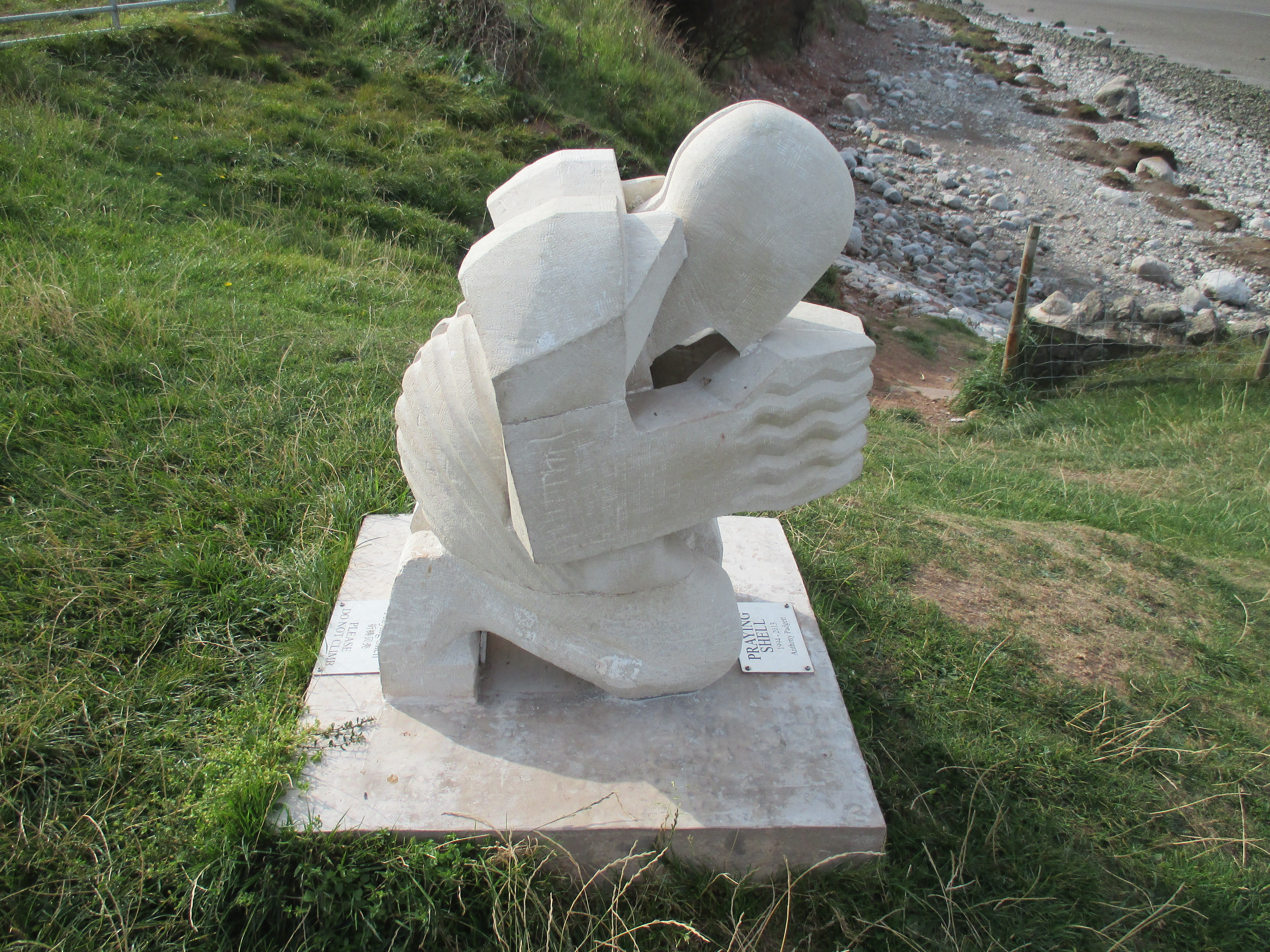
After 21 immigrant cockle pickers died at Morecambe Bay licensing was reintroduced for some employment agencies in the Gangmasters (Licensing) Act 2004.

Conduct of Employment Agencies and Employment Businesses Regulations 2003
- Statutory Instrument
- Parliament of the United Kingdom
- Citation: SI 2003/3319

Dates
- Made: 17th December 2003
Other legislation
Made under	Employment Agencies Act 1973

Text of statute as originally enacted

Text of the Conduct of Employment Agencies and Employment Businesses Regulations 2003 as in force today (including any amendments) within the United Kingdom, from legislation.gov.uk.

The Agency Workers Regulations 2010 provide workers some protection against less favourable treatment when they work through an employment agency. However, the right to equal treatment is limited to "basic working conditions", which is defined as pay and their working time, unless the common law, or general EU law principles are applicable. But an agency worker may, unlike part-time or fixed-term employees, appeal to a hypothetical comparator. This left uncertain the position of agency workers protection by the job security, child care and other rights for employees in ERA 1996. While the dominant view, after the UK Supreme Court decision in Autoclenz Ltd v Belcher, is that an agency worker will always qualify as an employee against both the agency and end-user when they work for a wage, the English Court of Appeal had previously issued conflicting judgments on whether an agency worker should have an unfair dismissal claim against the end-employer, the agency, or both or neither. Reflecting their vulnerable position, the regulation of agency work goes beyond anti-discrimination rights, to place a set of duties on employment agents' operations and conduct. Found in the Employment Agencies Act 1973 and the Conduct of Employment Agencies and Employment Businesses Regulations 2003 (SI 2003/3319) agencies are generally prohibited from charging fees to prospective workers. Various other duties include being honest in their job advertising, keeping all information on jobseekers confidential and complying with all employment laws. Originally agencies had to have licenses, and under the oversight of the Employment Agency Standards Inspectorate, they risked losing their licenses if found to be acting in violation of the law. The Deregulation and Contracting Out Act 1994 removed the licensing requirement, but this was partially reinstated for agencies in agricultural, shellfish and packing sectors through the Gangmasters (Licensing) Act 2004. In response to the 2004 Morecambe Bay cockling disaster this established another specific regulator, the Gangmasters Licensing Authority, to enforce employment law in those areas.

=== Free movement and immigration ===
The right to move freely and work, within the British Isles, Europe, and the world, is basic human need, yet constrained, evolving and contested. Magna Carta recognised free movement for work among merchants to England, there was unrestricted movement throughout the British Empire until 1962, and from 1973 until 2020 (following Brexit) British workers had the right to free movement throughout the European Union under core principles of EU law. However, there were periodic backlashes and constraints, such as the expulsion of Jews, Bretons and French people, there were restrictive laws imposed on "alien" residents, (Note: For example the Statute of Aliens 1484 complained aliens would "not take upon them any laborious Occupations, as going to Plough and Cart, and other like business ... and will in no wise suffer nor take any of the King's Subjects to work with them", and prohibited them from doing handicrafts unknown to local workmen, restricting them to work only as servants of the King's subjects. The Statute of Aliens 1529 (21 Hen. 8. c. 16) complained "they have not only conveyed and hid all their unlawful, untrue, subtil, and deceitful wares, which they untruly, subtilly, unsubstantially, and deceitfully have made ... and utter to our Subjects at excessive and unreasonable Prices", asserted that aliens caused unemployment of native craftsmen who "be constrained to live in Idleness" and "fall to Theft, Murder and other great Offences". The Linen Cloth Act 1663 (15 Cha. 2. c. 15), s. 3 by contrast enabled aliens to be naturalised after three years' residence and enjoy "all privileges whatsoever as the natural-born subjects". In the Aliens Act 1793 (30 Geo. 3. c. 4), whose purpose as stated in its preamble was to prevent "much danger" that "may arise to the publick Tranquillity from the Resort and Residence of Aliens", section 1 required masters of ships to declare to customs officers the number and details of aliens on board. Sections 15–16 enabled the Crown to order "any alien" to depart the realm; if he refused, he could be arrested, detained, sentenced by a court to a month prison and removed. The Aliens Restriction Act 1914 s 1(1)(k), the Secretary of State could regulated governing entry, residence and deportation an "any other matters which appear necessary or expedient with a view to the safety of the realm." The Aliens Order 1920, created under the Aliens Restriction (Amendment) Act 1919, brought a system of work permits issued by the Ministry of Labour.) and even within the realm successive Master and Servant Acts enabled employers to impose criminal penalties on workers who left without permission. (Note: e.g. Master and Servant Act 1823, and see Ernest Jones, Democracy Vindicated (4 January 1867): "In one year alone, 1864, the last return given, under the Master and Servants Act, 10,246 working men were imprisoned at the suit of their masters – not one master at the suit of the men!") In international law, the right to free movement so far only applies "within the borders of each State", and while there are basic standards for protection of refugees and asylum seekers, there is not yet an international right to work. Immigration status is not itself a protected characteristic under the Equality Act 2010 although mistreatment could amount to indirect discrimination, and itself creates a system of differential treatment by employers and the state.

The Immigration Act 1971 is the main law, which put non-UK Commonwealth citizens and foreign nationals on the same work permit scheme. Since 2002, the UK has used a "Points Based System", and with the UK's exit from the EU in 2020, this was extended to EU citizens as UK and EU free movement rights were abolished. There is no requirement to apply for a work visa for British citizens returning, people with indefinite leave to remain, refugees, and Irish citizens benefitting from the Common Travel Area that enables anyone to move freely, work, vote, and access social services within the UK and Ireland. While a decision on a person's immigration application is being made, a person's leave is extended, but the Immigration Rules are so strict that an application is invalid (meaning people have overstayed leave) unless it meets all formal requirements, with the government having a discretion but no duty to accept corrections in 10 working days. The limit to this is the Home Office's duty of good administration, which the Supreme Court has held to include a requirement of flexibility, despite the "high level of pedantry" required by the rules.

There are five main groups of work visa. First, the most common are the Skilled Worker visa and also a Health and Care Worker visa to attract people to the NHS and into care work. Second, there are visas for people to work in the UK through a multi-national employer, particularly the Global Business Mobility visa. Third, there are temporary work visas. Fourth, there are a group of visas without needing a job offer, such as for British Nationals (Overseas), graduates, or 'global talent'. Fifth, there are 'Start-up' and 'Innovator' visas for those who can show they have a credible business plan.

- Immigration Act 1971
- Immigration policy of the United Kingdom
- Immigration Rules
- Indefinite leave to remain
- Leave to enter
- UK Visas and Immigration
- Illegal immigration to the United Kingdom
- Immigration Act 2016
- Immigration Act 2014
- Immigration, Asylum and Nationality Act 2006
- Immigration and Asylum Act 1999
- Treaty on the Functioning of the European Union
- Free movement of people
- Freedom of movement for workers in the European Union
- Immigration to Europe

== Job security ==
The right to secure employment, either in one's current job or in a job that utilises a person's skills in the most socially productive way, is usually seen as crucial for the success of the economy and human development. The aim is to counterbalance the destructive effect on productivity and social costs that come from abuse of managerial power. Consistent with minimal international standards, employees in the United Kingdom have three principal job security rights, introduced originally by the Contracts of Employment Act 1963, the Redundancy Payments Act 1965 and the Industrial Relations Act 1971. First, after one month's work an employee must have at least one week's notice before any dismissal, unless there has been gross misconduct. This minimum rises to two weeks after two years, three weeks after three years, and so on, up to twelve weeks after twelve years. Second, after two years' work, the dismissal must be fair. This means the employer must have a justification based on an employee's capability, conduct, redundancy or another good reason, or the employee can claim damages or the job back from an Employment Tribunal. Third, also after two years' work and if dismissed because the enterprise no longer needs someone doing the employee's job, there is a right to a redundancy payment. Like the notice period, redundancy pay increases according to the number of years worked. Contracts should usually go beyond this bare minimum, but cannot go below. Compared to its European and Commonwealth counterparts, jobs in the UK are relatively insecure. Workers have few ways, except pressure through collective bargaining, to challenge a management's decision about dismissals before they take place. When collective redundancies are proposed, however, EU law has introduced a requirement that employers consult on changes. EU law also introduced a rule that if a business is transferred, for instance, during a merger or acquisition, employees may not have their terms worsened or lose their jobs without a good economic, technical or organisational reason. If employees do lose their work, they may fall back on a minimal system of state insurance, funded primarily through income tax or National Insurance, to collect a "jobseekers allowance", and may make use of public employment agencies to find employment again. The UK government has in the past aimed to create "full employment", but this goal has not necessarily translated into secure and stable work.

=== Wrongful dismissal ===
Wrongful dismissal refers to a termination of employment which contravenes a contract's terms, whether expressly agreed or implied by the courts. This depends on construction of the contract, read in the context of the statutory charter of rights for employees in the ERA 1996. In the old common law cases, the only term implied by the courts regarding termination was that employers had to give reasonable notice, and what was "reasonable" essentially depended on the professional status of the employee. In Creen v Wright, Lord Coleridge CJ held that a master mariner was entitled to a month's notice, though lower class workers could probably expect much less, "respectable" employees could expect more, and the period between wage payments would be a guide. Now the ERA 1996 section 86 prescribes that an employee should receive one week's notice before dismissal after one month's work, two weeks' notice after two years' work, and so forth up to twelve weeks for twelve years. The employer can give pay in lieu of notice, so long as the weeks' wages for the notice are paid in full. Often, contracts of employment contain express terms regarding a proper disciplinary procedure to be followed if someone is to be dismissed for disputes at work. Dismissals will usually be regarded as both wrongful and unfair if a procedure for dismissal is not followed. If a contractual disciplinary procedure is not followed, the employee may claim damages for the time it would have taken and the potential that she would still be employed. In Societe Generale, London Branch v Geys, the Supreme Court affirmed that a wrongful repudiation of a contract by the employer would not automatically terminate the agreement, because to do so would be to reward the wrongdoer. Only if an employee accepts the purported termination will the contract end. Until then the employer is liable for paying wages, and other terms of the contract, such as dismissal procedures, will survive.

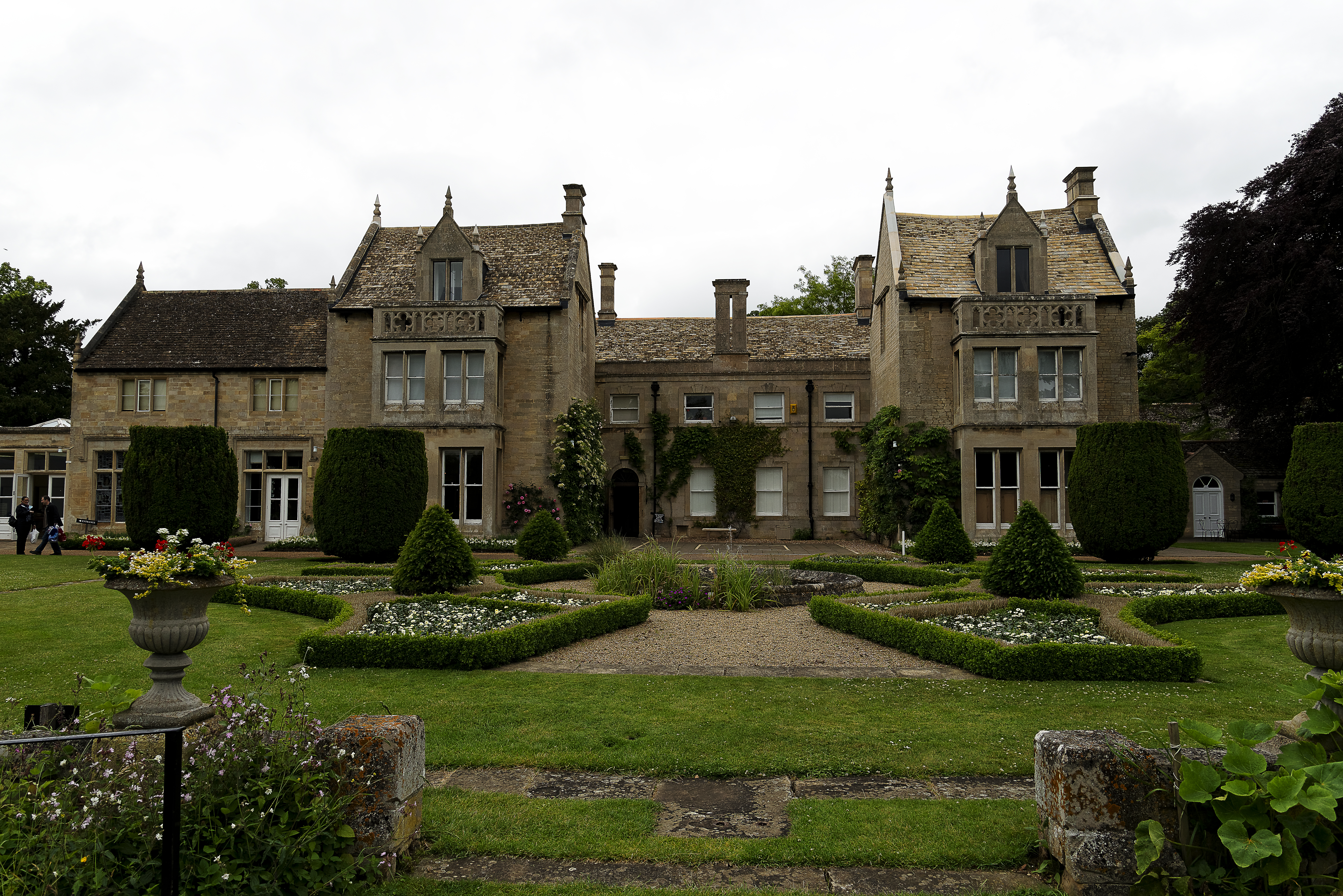
In Wilson v Racher, involving a gardener denigrated by his employer at Tolethorpe Hall, Edmund Davies LJ held employment relations require "a duty of mutual respect".

The requirements of notice and any disciplinary procedure do not apply if the employee was the one to have repudiated the contract, either expressly, or by conduct. As in the general law of contract, if an employee's conduct is so seriously bad that it manifests to the reasonable person an intention to not be bound, then the employer may dismiss the employee without notice. But if the employer is not justified in making a summary dismissal, the employee has a claim under ERA 1996 section 13 for a shortfall in wages. The same principle, that a serious breach of contract gives the other side the option to terminate, also works in favour of employees. In Wilson v Racher a gardener was bullied by his employer, the heir of Tolethorpe Hall, and gave him a rude telling off for not picking up some string on the lawn. Wilson, the gardener, told Racher "get stuffed, go and shit yourself". The Court of Appeal held that the employer's attitude meant this breakdown in trust and confidence was the employer's own doing, and because the law no longer saw employment as a "Czar-serf" relationship, Wilson was in the right and was wrongfully dismissed. The remedy for breach of contract, following a long tradition that specific performance should not result in draconian consequences or binding hostile parties to continue working together, is typically monetary compensation to put the claimant in the same position as if the contract had been properly performed. However, in Edwards v Chesterfield Royal Hospital, the Supreme Court held that an injunction is available to restrain breach of contract for the employer's failure to follow a doctor's contractual disciplinary procedure. This indicated that specific performance should always in principle be available, particularly in large organisations where people can be shifted to avoid personality conflicts.

The primary implied term of an employment contract that may be broken is mutual trust and confidence. In Johnson v Unisys Ltd the House of Lords held by 4 to 1 that damages for breach of mutual trust and confidence at the point of dismissal should not exceed the statutory limit on unfair dismissal claims, because otherwise the statutory limits would be undermined. This limit was £74,200 in 2013, though the median award was merely £4,560. This meant a computer worker who developed a psychiatric illness following a wrongful dismissal procedure could not claim his total economic losses, which would have amounted to £400,000 in damages. However, if the breach occurs while the employment relationship subsists, that limit is inapplicable. So in Eastwood v Magnox Electric plc, a school teacher who also suffered psychiatric injury, but as a result of harassment and victimisation while he still worked, could claim for a full measure of damages for the breach of mutual trust and confidence. In any event the limit is merely implied and depends on construction of the contract, so that it may be opted out of by express words providing for a higher sum, for example, by expressly providing for a disciplinary procedure. A notable absence of an implied term at common law historically (i.e. before the development of mutual trust and confidence) was that an employer would have to give any good reasons for a dismissal. This was recommended to be changed in the Donovan Report 1968, and it launched the present system of unfair dismissal.

=== Unfair dismissal ===
While "wrongful" dismissal concerns breaches of the terms of an employment contract, "unfair" dismissal is a claim based on the Employment Rights Act 1996 sections 94 to 134A. It governs the reasons for which an employer terminates a contract, and requires they fall into the statutory definition of what is "fair". The Industrial Relations Act 1971, following the Donovan Report 1968, set up its structure. Under ERA 1996 section 94 any employee, who is employed for over two years, may claim for an Employment Tribunal (composed of a judge, an employer and an employee representative) to review the decision. Temporary or seasonal breaks in employment, such as for teachers who are not in class over summer, cannot break the continuity of the contract for the qualifying period, even if a contract purports to be for a fixed term. An employee is only "dismissed" if the employer has decided to end the work relationship, or if they have constructively dismissed the employee through a serious breach of mutual trust and confidence. An employee will not have a claim if they have voluntarily resigned, though a court must be satisfied that someone truly intended to forgo the legal right to sue for unfair dismissal. In Kwik-Fit (GB) Ltd v Lineham Lineham used the toilet at work after drinking at the pub. Afterwards, in response to the manager rebuking him in front of other staff, he threw down his keys and drove off. He claimed he was dismissed, and the Tribunal agreed that at no time had Lineham resigned. By contrast in Western Excavating (ECC) Ltd v Sharp Sharp walked off because the company welfare officer refused to let him collect holiday pay immediately. Although Sharp was in financial difficulty, this was due to his absences, and so he was not justified in leaving, and not constructively dismissed. Under ERA 1996 section 203(1), statutory rights may not be excluded or limited, although section 203(2) and (3) still allows employers and employees to settle a legal claim, so long as the compromise agreement is made freely and with independent legal advice. It has also been held that an employee is not dismissed if the relationship is frustrated. In Notcutt v Universal Equipment Co (London) Ltd a man's heart attack meant he could no longer work. The employer paid no wages during the ordinary notice period, but was successful in arguing that the contract was impossible to perform and therefore void. This doctrine, applicable as a default rule in general contract law, is controversial since unlike commercial parties it will be rare that an employee has the foresight or ability to contract around the rule. The Supreme Court recently emphasised in Gisda Cyf v Barratt that the "need to segregate intellectually common law principles relating to contract law, even in the field of employment, from statutorily conferred rights is fundamental." This meant that when an employee claimed unfair dismissal, after accusations of allegedly inappropriate behaviour at a private party, the three-month time limit for her claim only began running when the employer had actually notified her. The general contract law principle that notifications take effect when arriving during business hours was not even "a preliminary guide" to the interpretation of the right to a fair dismissal.

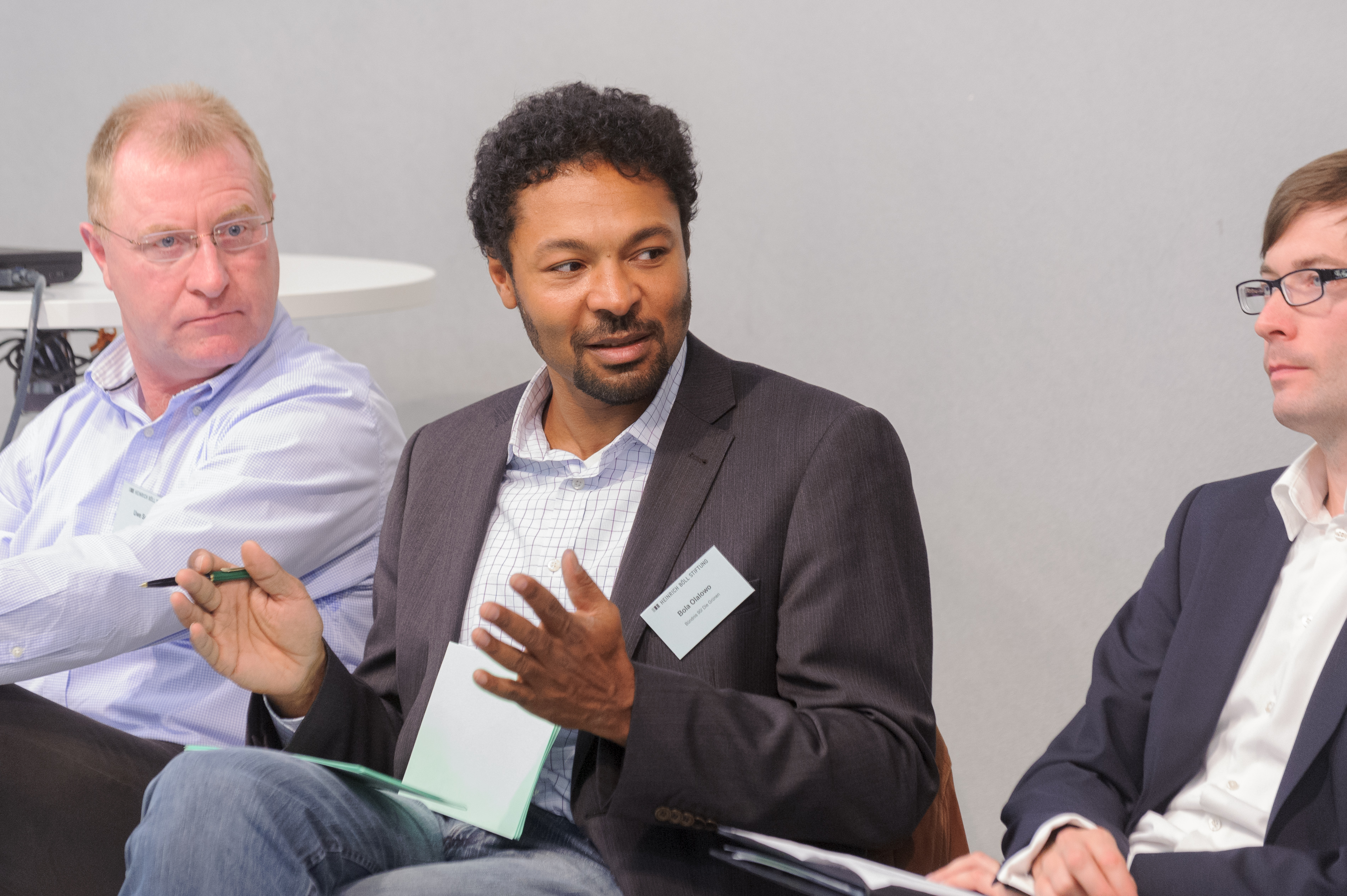
In many EU countries, including Germany, the work council which is elected by staff may prevent dismissals taking effect until court confirms them as being socially justified. UK employees remain more vulnerable, and must usually be out of work while making claims to an Employment Tribunal.

Once it is established that a dismissal took place, the employer must show that its reason for dismissing the employee was "fair". Dismissal on grounds of union membership, or one of a number of grounds set out in sections 99 to 107 of the Employment Rights Act 1996, will be automatically unfair. Otherwise the employer has the opportunity to show the dismissal is fair if it falls within five main categories listed in ERA 1996 section 98. The dismissal must have been because of the employee's capability or qualifications, because of conduct, because the employee was redundant, because continued employment would contravene a law, or because of "some other substantial reason". If the employer has an argument based on one of these categories, then the tribunal evaluates whether the employer's actual decision fell within a "reasonable range of responses", i.e. that a reasonable employer could have acted the same way. Thus the review standard lies in between an outright perversity, or "Wednesbury unreasonableness" test and a forthright reasonable person test. The test arguably requires Tribunals to evaluate the employer's conduct according to good enterprise practice, by analogy to the Bolam test in tort. The "proportionality test" (requiring the employer's action is appropriate, necessary and reasonable in pursuit of a legitimate aim) has also been proposed as an alternative, which would have the advantage of deferring to the employer's aim, if legitimate, but scrutinising whether its actions were proportionate. In practice, the Court of Appeal has given conflicting judgments and remains unable to articulate what the test means, prompting the question of how a "hypothetical reasonable employer" standard under section 98(4)(a) should actually be applied. It has been repeated that Tribunals should not substitute their judgment for the employer's. However, there is considerable room for Tribunals to assess the facts and come to their own conclusions, which can only be appealed on legal grounds, and not on their judgment of good workplace relations. For example, in a conduct case, HSBC Bank plc v Madden, the Court of Appeal held that it was acceptable for a Tribunal to have decided that dismissing an employee for potential involvement in theft of credit cards was fair, even though an actual police investigation turned up no evidence. By contrast, in Bowater v Northwest London Hospitals NHS Trust, an employer argued a nurse who, while physically restraining a naked patient who was unconscious and having a seizure, said "It's been a few months since I have been in this position with a man underneath me" was lewd and deserved dismissal for her misconduct. The Tribunal said the dismissal was unfair and the Court of Appeal held the Tribunal had competently exercised its discretion in granting the unfair dismissal claim. The absence of a role for elected worker representatives in assessing the fairness of the employer or manager's conduct in the UK contrasts to many EU member states. While courts act as a final check, it is often thought that the parties best placed to resolve disputes would be representatives of all staff members, who (unlike an employer or manager) usually have fewer conflicts of interest in dismissal disputes.

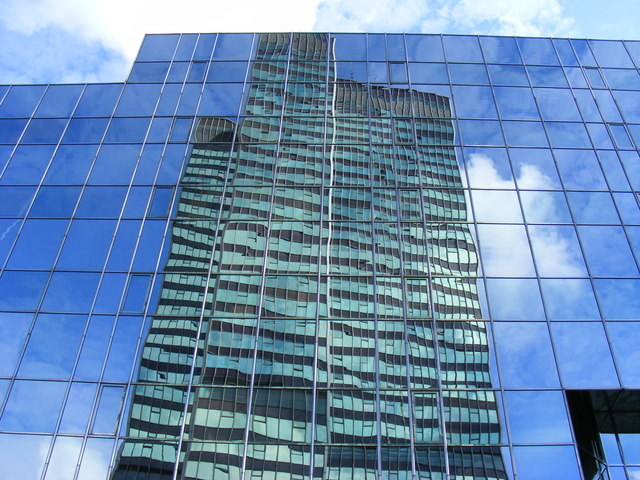
ACAS, headquartered at Euston Tower, issues a binding Code of Practice on how to handle workplace disputes and potential dismissals.

While some courts have chosen to be more deferential to the employer's substantive reasons for dismissal, they emphasise more strongly the importance of employers having a fair process. The Advisory, Conciliation and Arbitration Service Code of Practice (2009) explains that good industry practice for disciplinaries requires, among other things, written warnings, a fair hearing by people who have no reason to side against the employee, or with any manager involved in the dispute, and the opportunity for union representation. Often a company handbook will include its own system, which if not followed will likely mean the dismissal was unfair. Nevertheless, in Polkey v AE Dayton Services Ltd the House of Lords held that, in a case where a van driver was told he was redundant on the spot, if an employer can show the dismissal would be made regardless of whether a procedure was followed, damages can be reduced to zero. In the Employment Act 2002, Parliament made an abortive attempt to instil some kind of mandatory minimum procedure for everybody, but after complaints from employers and unions alike that it was merely encouraging a "tick-box" culture, it was repealed in the Employment Act 2008. Now if the ACAS Code is not followed, and this is unreasonable, an unfair dismissal award can be increased by 25 per cent. Generally, under ERA 1996 sections 119 and 227, the principle for a "basic" unfair dismissal award is that, with a cap of £350 per week and a maximum of 20 weeks, an employee should receive one week's pay for each year employed if aged between 22 and 40, 1½ weeks if over 40 and ½ a week if under 22. By ERA 1996 section 123, the employee may also be entitled to the more significant, but discretionary "compensatory" award. This should take into account the actual losses of the employee as just and equitable, based on loss of immediate and future wages, the manner of the dismissal and loss of future unfair dismissal protection and redundancy rights. This is capped, but usually increased in line with RPI inflation. It was £74,200 in 2013, though the median award of a successful claimant was merely £4,560. Very few claimants are successful in securing reinstatement, although if they are suspended from their workplace and colleagues, the evidence suggests that the experience of litigation sours the relationship so that the employee will no longer wish to return. It is therefore important that in 2011 the Supreme Court emphasised in Edwards v Chesterfield Royal Hospital that in principle an employee may secure an injunction to continue working while internal disciplinary procedures are followed. Particularly given the difficulty of finding alternative employment while removed from work, it is not clear why a staff member who retains the support of his or her colleagues (as opposed to a manager who potentially has a conflict of interest) should not also be able to continue working until a dismissal is confirmed by a court.

=== Redundancy ===
Redundancies are a special kind of dismissal, which attract specific regulation. Since the Redundancy Payments Act 1965, staff must receive a payment for losing their jobs if the employer no longer has an economic need for their job. This policy is designed to internalise some of the social costs that employers create if they dismiss staff, to try and disincentivise unnecessary job losses, and contribute to employees' costs in unemployment. Under ERA 1996 section 162, employees over age 40 receive 1½ weeks' pay per year they had worked, employees aged 22 to 40 receive 1 week's pay per year worked, and employees age 21 or less receive half a week's pay, though the upper limit was £464 per week in 2014. Dismissal for redundancy counts "fair" in substance under ERA 1996 section 98, but the employer may still carry out an unfair procedure to dismiss the redundant employees. Under the Employment Rights Act 1996 section 139, a "redundancy" exists when an employer's demand for an employee's role ceases or diminishes. In situations where employees have lost their jobs, this may be straightforward. In cases where an employer uses its discretion practically to worsen the employees' position the answer may depend on the employees' contracts. In Lesney Products & Co v Nolan a toy company stopped giving its workers overtime. Some refused to work. They were dismissed, and the workers claimed they were redundant. Lord Denning MR held they were not made "redundant" by their terms being changed, even worsened, because "nothing should be done to impair the ability of employers to reorganise their work force and their times and conditions of work so as to improve efficiency." Apparently, they had simply left stopped working of their own accord. This view is controversial, because if the total wage bill spent by the employer is reduced, it would follow that demand for work (reflected in the employer's willingness to pay) must also be diminished. Thus, other courts have suggested the contract terms are irrelevant, and that the test should be purely based on the economic reality of diminished demand. Employers can also argue that a dismissal is for "some other substantial reason". In Hollister v National Farmers' Union a farmer's refusal to accept decreased pension entitlements, after a consultation process, was said to be a "substantial" reason for dismissal. It is not clear whether worsening employees' contract terms, without their consent or collective approval, was envisaged by the Act as way to evade redundancy payments.

"... the Bill gives reality to the idea that... "a man has some rights in his job just as an employer holds rights in his property, and his rights gain in value with the years." I would say to the House that if a man is deprived of those rights by economic circumstances outside his control, he ought to be compensated.... The purpose of redundancy pay is to compensate a worker for loss of job, irrespective of whether that leads to any unemployment. It is to compensate him for the loss of security, possible loss of earnings and fringe benefits, and the uncertainty and anxiety of change of job."

— Redundancy Payments Bill, Second Reading, Ray Gunter, Hansard HC Deb (26 April 1965) vol 711, cols 33-160

Although workers could be redundant, the employer may still be liable for unfair dismissal by following an unfair procedure. The procedure the employer follows to select employees to make redundant must be procedurally fair. In Williams v Compair Maxam Ltd Browne-Wilkinson J held that the proper steps should be to (1) give all warning possible (2) consult the union (3) agree objective criteria (4) follow those criteria, and (5) always check there if there is alternative employment rather than dismissal. This meant that the managers, who had selected workers to lose their jobs based on personal preferences, had unfairly dismissed the workforce. The criteria that the employer uses must be observable, and reviewable. However, employers do not need to disclose to employees all the details of their reasoning when they select people for redundancy unless there is a specific complaint of unfairness. A last in, first out policy, as used in many collective agreements will be regarded as fair. For example, in Rolls-Royce plc v Unite the Union, Rolls-Royce plc challenged a collective agreement which gave extra points in a selection procedure for years of service as being unlawful discrimination against younger workers (who it wished to retain). The Court of Appeal agreed with the union that this represented a proportionate means of achieving a legitimate aim of rewarding seniority, particularly since older workers might find alternative employment much harder to secure. If possible, employers should attempt to redeploy redundant staff within their firm. Under ERA 1996 section 141 an employee should accept a suitable offer for redeployment, and will lose entitlement to redundancy if the offer is declined. 'Suitable' means substantially similar in terms of status, wages and types of duties. For example, in Thomas Wragg & Sons Ltd v Wood the Employment Appeal Tribunal held that it was reasonable for Wood to refuse an alternative job offer the day before his termination took effect. He was therefore redundant. There is also, under section 138, a right to refuse an alternative job to which an employee is redeployed after a four-week trial period if it would be reasonable. However, redeployment remains an option for the employer that gives it greater scope to avoid redundancy payments. A right for the employee to be redeployed does not yet exist, except to the extent that the employer must consult about redeployment possibilities when more than 20 employees could be redundant.

=== Undertaking transfers and insolvency ===
Another context in which the common law left workers particularly vulnerable was where the business for which they worked was transferred between one person and another. In Nokes v Doncaster Amalgamated Collieries Ltd it was held (albeit to protect the worker from draconian sanctions in the arcane Employers and Workmen Act 1875) that an employment contract could not transfer without the consent of the parties involved. Consequently, in a situation where company A sold its assets (including contracts) to company B, the employment relationship would sever and the only claim a worker would have for dismissal would be against company A. Particularly from the 1950s, the view was increasingly accepted across Europe that workers have something more than a personal right, and akin to a property right in their jobs. Just as the transfer of a freehold property between two landlords would not mean that a tenant could be evicted, the first Transfers of Undertakings Directive, passed in 1978 and updated in 2001 (often still referred to as the "Acquired Rights Directive"), required that a business transferee would have to provide a good economic, technical or organisational reason if they were either to not retain all previous employees, or wanted to make detrimental variations to their workers' contracts. This means that the new employer who is a transferee of a business through an asset sale is in no better position than would be a new owner who gained control of a business by buying out a company's shares: contractual variations require the employees' consent and dismissal rights remain as if it were the old employer. As implemented by the Transfer of Undertakings (Protection of Employment) Regulations 2006, a clear example where employees contracts transfer was in Litster v Forth Dry Dock. The House of Lords held that a purposive interpretation is to be given to the legislation so that where 12 dockworkers were sacked an hour before a business sale, their contracts remained in effect if the employees would still be there in absence of an unfair dismissal. This does not, however, mean that employees unfairly dismissed before a sale have a right to their jobs back, because national law's normal remedy remains with a preference for damages over specific performance. The same principle goes for any variation that works to the detriment of the employee. So the transferee employer may not (without a good business reason) for example, try to impose a single new gardening clause or withdraw tenure, or the employee will have a claim for constructive dismissal.

An acute question for the TUPE Regulations, particularly in the years when the Conservative government was implementing a policy of shrinking the size of the public sector, was the extent they applied to jobs being outsourced, typically by a public body, like a local council, or changed between businesses in a competitive tender process for public procurement. On this point a series of ECJ decisions came to the view that there could be a relevant transfer, covered by the Directive, even where there was no contractual link between a transferor and a transferee business, so long as the business entity retained its "identity". In turn the "identity" of a business would be determined by the degree to which the business' factors of production remained the same before and after a sale. It could be that no employees were hired after an asset sale, but the sacked employees would still have a claim because all their old workplace and capital equipment was being used by the new employer. It is also relevant to what extent a business is capital or labour-intensive. So in Oy Liikenne Ab v Liskojärvi the ECJ held that it was unlikely that 45 Helsinki bus drivers' contracts were transferred, between the company that lost the contract and the new bus company that won it, even though 33 drivers were rehired, because "bus transport cannot be regarded as an activity based essentially on manpower". On the other hand, employees will benefit when a new employer offers old staff their jobs, the intention to rehire makes it more likely the court will deem there to be a transfer.

Often business transfers take place when a company has plunged into an insolvency procedure. If a company enters liquidation, which aims to wind down the business and sell off the assets, TUPER 2006 regulation 8(7) states that the rules on transfer will not apply. The main objective, however, in an insolvency procedure particularly since the Cork Report and the Enterprise Act 2002, is to effect rescues through the system of company administration. An administrator's task under the Insolvency Act 1986 Schedule B1, paragraph 3, is either to rescue the company as a going concern, rescue the business typically by finding a suitable buyer and thus save jobs, or as a last resort put the company into liquidation. If employees are kept on after an administrator is appointed for more than 14 days, under paragraph 99 the administrator becomes responsible for adopting their contracts. The liability on contracts is limited to "wages and salaries". This includes pay, holiday pay, sick pay and occupational pension contributions, but has been held to not include compensation for unfair dismissal cases, wrongful dismissal, or protective awards for failure to consult the workforce before redundancies. If the business rescue does ultimately fail, then such money due employees achieves the status of "super priority" among different creditors' claims.

The Insolvency Act 1986 priority list

1. Fixed charge holders
2. Insolvency practitioner fees and expenses, s 176ZA
3. Preferential creditors, ss 40, 115, 175, 386 and Sch 6
4. Ring fenced fund for unsecured creditors, s 176A and SI 2003/2097
5. Floating charge holders
6. Unsecured creditors, s 74(2)(f)
7. Interest on debts proved in winding up, s 189
8. Money due to a member under a contract to redeem or repurchase shares not completed before winding up, Companies Act 2006 s 735
9. Debts due to members under s 74(2)(f)
10. Repayment of residual interests to preference, and then ordinary shareholders.

— Sources: Insolvency Act 1986 and Companies Act 2006

The priority list in insolvency sees creditors with fixed security (typically banks) get paid first. Second are preferential creditors. Third are unsecured creditors up to a limit of £600,000. Fourth are floating charge holders (usually banks again). Fifth are remaining debts to unsecured creditors (in the unlikely event that anything remains). Sixth are "deferred debts" (typically to company insiders). Last are shareholders. Among the preferential creditors, the insolvency practitioners' fees together with adopted contracts attain super-priority. Otherwise, employees wages and pensions still have preferential status, but only up to an £800 limit, a figure which has remained unchanged since 1986. Employees having priority among creditors, albeit not above fixed security holders, dates back to 1897, and is justified on the ground that employees are particularly incapable, unlike banks, of diversifying their risk, and forms one of the requirements in the ILO Protection of Workers' Claims (Employer's Insolvency) Convention. Often this limited preference is not enough, and can take a long time to realise. Reflecting the Insolvency Protection Directive under ERA 1996 section 166 any employee may lodge a claim with the National Insurance Fund for outstanding wages. Under ERA 1996 section 182 the amount claimable is the same as that for unfair dismissal (£350 in 2010) for a limit of 8 weeks. If an employee has been unpaid for a longer period, she may choose the most beneficial 8 weeks. The Pensions Act 2004 governs a separate system for protecting pension claims, through the Pension Protection Fund. This aims to fully insure all pension claims. Together with minimum redundancy payments, the guarantees of wages form a meagre cushion which requires more of a systematic supplementation when people remain unemployed.

=== Full employment ===
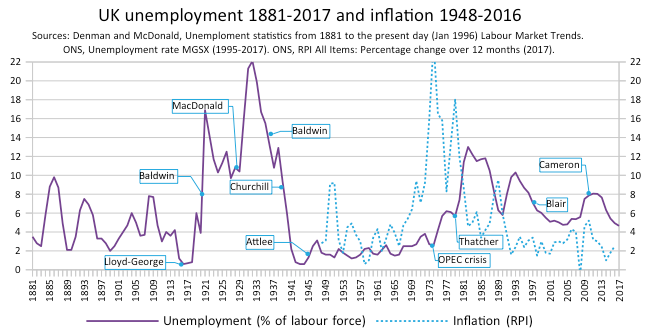
Unemployment rate 1881 to 2017

One of the most important labour rights, on which all other labour rights rest, is the "right to work" and therefore to full employment "at fair wages" and with all the hours one needs. In international law everyone 'has the right to work, to free choice of employment, to just and favourable conditions of work and to protection against unemployment.' However, it does not say how this should be achieved. In the UK, three main legal policies have been used: fiscal, monetary, and insurance. First, from the White Paper on Employment Policy in 1944, the UK government announced a strategy to spend money to counteract volatility in private investment in five-year blocks. Private spending can be prone to boom and bust, international investment can also, while consumer spending is generally more stable, and government spending can be actively managed. The government also passed the Distribution of Industry Act 1945, which ensured that investment was spread to regions as well as cities, and the Disabled Persons (Employment) Act 1944 which required larger firms to hire a quota of disabled people. Full employment, at almost zero cost to government, lasted until the 1973 oil crisis when the Organization of Petroleum Exporting Countries raises petrol prices, and so made the cost of running the economy higher. This inflation was argued by economists, such as Milton Friedman and Friedrich von Hayek to prove there is a natural rate of unemployment, which makes attempts to get full employment impossible. While this theory lacked evidence, From 1979, the new Conservative government led by Margaret Thatcher abandoned full employment as a goal, and triggered soaring inflation, as it began attacking organised labour. In 2019, the concept of a natural rate of unemployment, which supposedly was caused by stronger labour rights, has been abandoned by the head of the US Federal Reserve Bank. Briefly, the Welfare Reform and Work Act 2016 section 1 created a duty on government to report 'annually on the progress which has been made towards full employment' but this was abandoned with the 2017 general election. Since 2010, while there has been decreasing unemployment, there has been a large rise in under-employment and the longest cuts to workers' wages since the industrial revolution. This suggests a reluctance of the government to strengthen the incomes and bargaining power of workers if it could decrease the power of corporate capital.

'... my worry is as follows, that there may have been people making the actual policy decisions or people behind them or people behind them who never believed for a moment that this was the correct way to bring down inflation. They did however see that it would be a very, very good way to raise unemployment, and raising unemployment was an extremely desirable way of, of reducing the strength of the working classes, if you like. That what was engineered there – in Marxist terms – was a crisis of capitalism which re-created a reserve army of labour, and has allowed the capitalist to make high profits ever since. Now again, I'd not say I believe that story, but when I really worry about all this I worry whether indeed that was really what was going on.'

— Alan Budd, Chief Economic Adviser to HM Treasury under Margaret Thatcher on Pandora's Box, Episode 3: The League of Gentlemen (Thursday, 18 June 1992) BBC2

Second, the UK government, particularly since it abandoned using investment and fiscal policy, has emphasised monetary policy. The Bank of England as the UK's central bank is able to influence private banks' lending rates by adjusting its interest rate for lending to them (the "Bank of England base rate"), by buying up assets in large quantities backed by the UK government, by changing reserve requirements, or by fixing rates. If private banks are influenced to reduced their interest rates, this stimulates more lending and borrowing, increases credit and money supply in the economy, encourages businesses to hire more people, and so can reduce employment. However, the Bank of England Act 1998 section 11 states the Bank's objectives for monetary policy are (a) to maintain price stability, and (b) subject to that, to 'support the economic policy of Her Majesty's Government, including its objectives for growth and employment.' Although the Bank of England could use monetary policy to encourage investment up to full employment it has not done so because it has also been affected by theories of "natural" unemployment, and triggering higher inflation. Third, the UK government has considerable control over unemployment through its social insurance system. Since the poor laws were abolished and national insurance was introduced, the government has paid people money if they cannot find work. Paying insurance was thought to impel the government to encourage full employment, while it also increases labour's bargaining power: workers need not accept any job on starvation wages, because they will have a minimum income to survive. This is part of the universal right to social security. Today under the Jobseekers Act 1995 a 'Jobseeker's Allowance' is payable for up to 182 days if someone has made contributions for over 2 years, but for people over 25 this was only up to £73.10 a week in 2019. Further, under the Welfare Reform Act 2012 sections 6-6J the Secretary of State can write rules to place conditions for work on people claiming jobseeker's allowance. In R (Reilly) v Secretary of State for Work and Pensions two claimants argued that requirements to work for free were ultra vires, and also amounted to forced labour. The Secretary of State lost on the ultra vires point, but the Supreme Court declined to hold that "workfare" amounted to forced labour. Nevertheless, it appears from the original conception of William Beveridge of a welfare state with Full Employment in a Free Society.

== Enforcement and tribunals ==
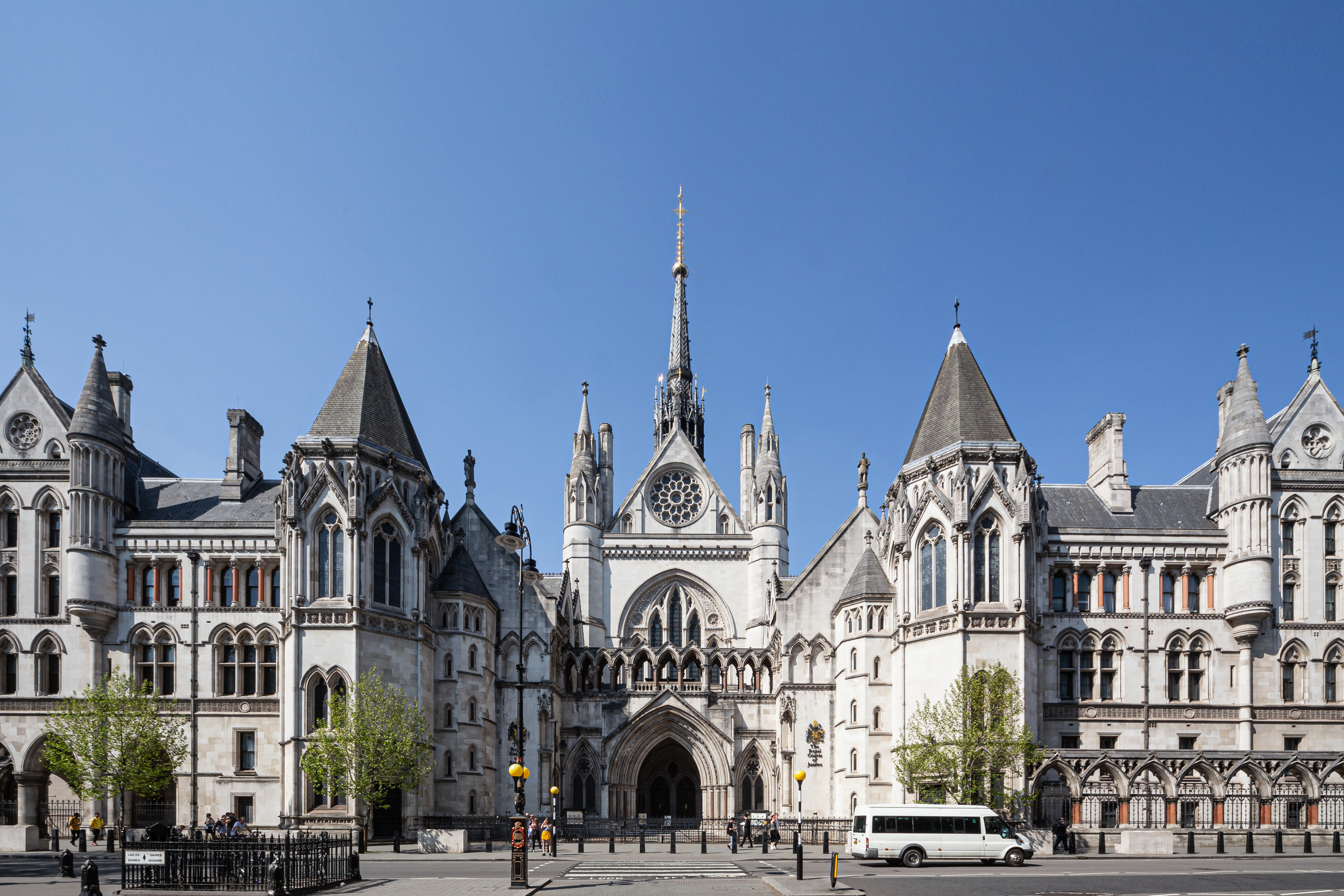
Unions, courts and government regulators enforce labour rights. According to the Supreme Court, any worker can seek an injunction in the High Court for breach of contract.

UK labour law is enforced through three main methods: trade unions, the Tribunal and court system, and by government agencies. First, the most effective system of enforcement and creation of labour rights it through workers joining unions, and collectively bargaining. Whatever rights exist in law, employers routinely flout people's rights at work, particularly when the rights involve more complex standards of equality, job security and consultation. The desire to keep a cohesive workforce, and avoid the possibility of strike action, is the primary incentive for employers to negotiate in good faith with employee representatives, and ensure that there is a joint approach to upholding all workplace rights, such as pay, working time, safety, equal treatment and job security. Unions also advise and represent individual workers in grievances and disciplinaries and are protected by law in the conduct of all trade union activities.

Second, any worker can apply to an Employment Tribunal to complain that a right has been breached under the Employment Tribunals Act 1996. R (UNISON) v Lord Chancellor held that the UK government's attempt to impose fees, which led to a massive drop in people's access to justice, was unlawful. To bring a Tribunal claim, a claimant must fill out an "ET1" form, and give notice to the Advisory, Conciliation and Arbitration Service of its attempt to seek conciliation. After a Tribunal judgment, either side may appeal to the Employment Appeal Tribunal, and following this to the Court of Appeal and the Supreme Court on questions of law. A significant limit on Tribunal applications is that Tribunals have been held unable to award injunctions. By contrast, any claim for breach of contract, including several rights in the Equality Act 2010, can be brought in the High Court: the right to an injunction is in principle available for all types of contractual right, particularly to ensure fairness in dismissal, since damages are usually not an adequate remedy. Third, a small number of government regulators may assist in the enforcement of rights. Her Majesty's Revenue & Customs is meant to oversee the enforcement of tax, National Insurance and payment of the minimum wage. Under the Equality Act 2006, the Equality and Human Rights Commission was established, and although it has no enforcement powers, it can join litigation, and it develops codes of best practice for employers to use. The Central Arbitration Committee is meant to support trade union rights, such as to statutory recognition and to information, but in practice is a toothless, pro-employer operation, packed with government appointees that has systematically opposed union rights. The Health and Safety Executive is meant to enforce health and safety rights, but again is appointed by government and has been largely ineffective in preventing mass safety violations during the Covid-19 pandemic. The Gangmasters Licensing Authority oversees enforcement of a limited number of employment agencies in food packing and shellfish industries, and the Employment Agency Standards Inspectorate has a role for agencies.

== International labour law ==
Since the Industrial Revolution the labour movement has been concerned how economic globalisation would weaken the bargaining power of workers, as their employers could move to hire workers abroad without the protection of the labour standards at home. Following World War I, the Treaty of Versailles contained the first constitution of a new International Labour Organization founded on the principle that "labour is not a commodity", and for the reason that "peace can be established only if it is based upon social justice". The primary role of the ILO has been to coordinate principles of international labour law by issuing ILO Conventions, which codify labour laws on all matters. Members of the ILO can voluntarily adopt and ratify the conventions by enacting the rules in their domestic law. For instance, the first Hours of Work (Industry) Convention, 1919 requires a maximum of a 48-hour week, and has been ratified by 52 out of 185 member states. The UK ultimately refused to ratify the Convention, as did many current EU members states, although the Working Time Directive adopts its principles, subject to the individual opt-out. The present constitution of the ILO comes from the Declaration of Philadelphia 1944, and under the Declaration on Fundamental Principles and Rights at Work 1998 classified eight conventions as core. Together these require freedom to join a union, bargain collectively and take action (Conventions Nos 87 and 98) abolition of forced labour (29 and 105) abolition labour by children before the end of compulsory school (138 and 182) and no discrimination at work (Nos 100 and 111). Compliance with the core Conventions is obligatory from the fact of membership, even if the country has not ratified the Convention in question. To ensure compliance, the ILO is limited to gathering evidence and reporting on member states' progress, so that publicity will put public and international pressure to reform the laws. Global reports on core standards are produced yearly, while individual reports on countries who have ratified other Conventions are compiled on a bi-annual or perhaps less frequent basis.

As one of the few international organisations with real enforcement power through trade sanctions, the WTO has been the target for calls by labour lawyers to incorporate global standards of the International Labour Organization.

Because the ILO's enforcement and sanction mechanisms are weak, there has been significant discussion about incorporating labour standards in the World Trade Organisation's operation, since its formation in 1994. The WTO oversees, primarily, the General Agreement on Tariffs and Trade which is a treaty aimed at reducing customs, tariffs and other barriers to free import and export of goods, services and capital between its 157 member countries. Unlike for the ILO, if the WTO rules on trade are contravened, member states who secure a judgment by the Dispute Settlement procedures (effectively a judicial process) may retaliate through trade sanctions. This could include reimposition of targeted tariffs against the non-compliant country. Proponents of an integrated approach have called for a "social clause" to be inserted into the GATT agreements, for example by amending article XX, which gives an exception to the general trade barrier reduction rules allowing imposition of sanctions for breaches of human rights. An explicit reference to core labour standards could allow action where a WTO member state is found to be in breach of ILO standards. Opponents argue that such an approach could backfire and undermine labour rights, as a country's industries, and therefore its workforce, are necessarily harmed but without any guarantee that labour reform would take place. Furthermore, it was argued in the Singapore Ministerial Declaration 1996 that "the comparative advantage of countries, particularly low-age developing countries, must in no way be put into question." On this view, countries ought to be able to take advantage of low wages and poor conditions at work as a comparative advantage in order to boost their exports. It is disputed that business will relocate production to low wage countries from higher wage countries such as the UK, because that choice is said to depend on productivity of workers. However, the view of many labour lawyers and economists remains that more trade, when workers have weaker bargaining power and less mobility, still allows business to opportunistically take advantage of workers by moving production, and that a coordinated multilateral approach with targeted measures against specific exports is preferable. While the WTO has yet to incorporate labour rights into its procedures for dispute settlements, many countries began to make bilateral agreements that protected core labour standards instead. Moreover, in domestic tariff regulations not yet touched by the WTO agreements, countries have given preference to other countries who do respect core labour rights, for example under the EU Tariff Preference Regulation, articles 7 and 8.

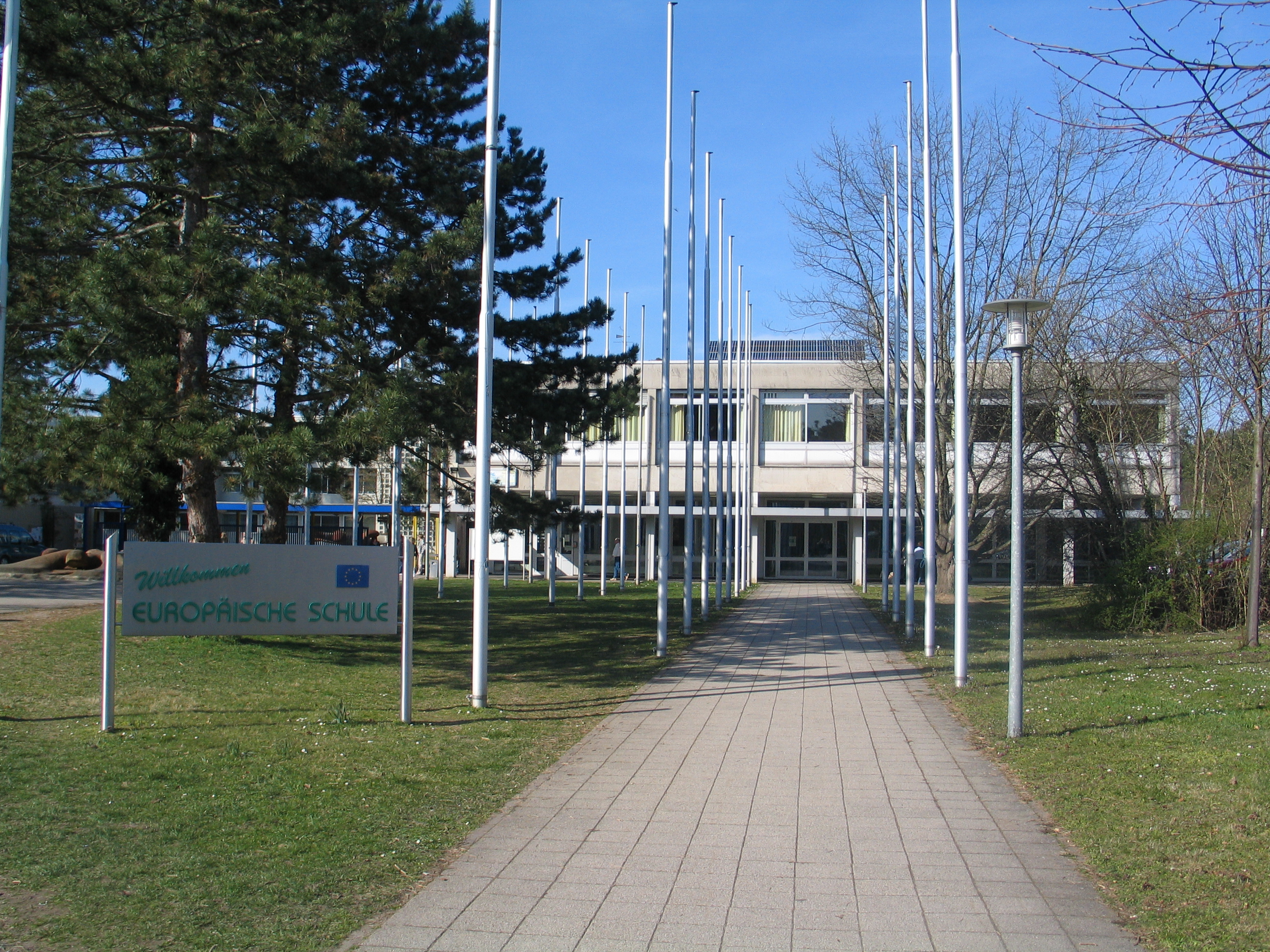
In Duncombe, the Supreme Court found an employee of the European School, Karlsruhe in Germany was covered by UK labour rights because their employer was the UK government. Because labour rights should not be undercut by a "race to the bottom", conflict of laws principles allow workers to claim rights from the more favourable jurisdiction.

While the debate over labour standards applied by the ILO and the WTO seeks to balance standards with free movement of capital globally, conflicts of laws (or private international law) issues arise where workers move from home to go abroad. If a worker from the UK performs part of her job in other countries (a "peripatetic" worker) or if a worker is engaged in the UK to work as an expatriate abroad, an employer may seek to characterise the contract of employment as being governed by other countries' laws, where labour rights may be less favourable than at home. In Lawson v Serco Ltd three joined appeals went to the House of Lords. Lawson worked for a multinational business on Ascension Island, a British territory as a security guard. Botham worked in Germany for the Ministry of Defence. Crofts, and his copilots, worked mostly in the air for a Hong Kong airline, though his contract stated he was based at Heathrow. All sought to claim unfair dismissal, but their employers argued they should not be covered by the territorial reach of the Employment Rights Act 1996. Lord Hoffmann held that, first, if workers are in Great Britain, they are covered. Second, peripatetic workers like Crofts would be covered if they are ordinarily working in the UK, but that this could take account of the company's basings policy. Third, if workers were expatriate the general rule was they would not be covered, but that exceptionally if there was a "close connection" between the work and the UK they would be covered. This meant that Lawson and Botham would have claims, because both Lawson and Botham's position was in a British enclave, which made a close enough connection. Subsequent cases have emphasised that the categories of expatriate worker who will exceptionally be covered are not closed. So in Duncombe v Secretary of State for Children, Schools and Families an employee of the UK government teaching in EU schools could claim unfair dismissal because their employer held their connection close to the UK. Then, in Ravat v Halliburton Manufacturing and Services Ltd an employee in Libya, working for a German company that was part of the American multinational oil conglomerate Halliburton, was still covered by UK unfair dismissal rights because he was given an assurance that his contract would come under UK law. This established a close connection. The result is that access to mandatory employment rights mirrors the framework for contractual claims under the EU Rome I Regulation article 8. It is also necessary that a UK court has jurisdiction to hear a claim, which under the Brussels I Regulation articles 20 to 23, requires the worker habitually works in the UK, or was engaged there. Both EU Regulations emphasise that the rules should be applied with the purpose of protecting the worker.

As well as having legal protection for workers rights, an objective of trade unions has been to organise their members across borders in the same way that multinational corporations have organised their production globally. In order to meet the balance of power that comes from ability of businesses to dismiss workers or relocate, unions have sought to take collective action and strike internationally. However, this kind of coordination was halted in the European Union in two decisions. In Laval Ltd v Swedish Builders Union a group of Latvian workers were sent to a construction site in Sweden on low pay. The local Swedish Union took industrial action to make Laval Ltd sign up to the local collective agreement. Under the Posted Workers Directive, article 3 lays down minimum standards for workers being posted away from home so that workers always receive at least the minimum rights that they would have at home in case their place of work has lower minimum rights. Article 3(7) goes on to say that this "shall not prevent application of terms and conditions of employment which are more favourable to workers". Most people thought this meant that more favourable conditions could be given than the minimum (e.g. in Latvian law) by the host state's legislation or a collective agreement. However, in an interpretation seen as astonishing by many, the ECJ said that only the posting state could raise standards beyond its minimum for posted workers, and any attempt by the host state, or a collective agreement (unless the collective agreement is declared universal under article 3(8)) would be an infringement of the business' freedom to provide services under TFEU article 56. This decision was implicitly reversed by the European Union legislature in the Rome I Regulation, which makes clear in recital 34 that the host state may allow more favourable standards. However, in The Rosella, the ECJ also held that a blockade by the International Transport Workers' Federation against a business that was using an Estonian flag of convenience (i.e. saying it was operating under Estonian law to avoid labour standards of Finland) infringed the business' right of free establishment under TFEU article 49. The ECJ said that it recognised the workers' "right to strike" in accordance with ILO Convention 87, but said that its use must be proportionately to the right of the business' establishment. The result is that the European Court of Justice's recent decisions create a significant imbalance between the international freedom of business, and that of labour, to bargain and take action to defend their interests. For this reason it has been questioned whether the ECJ's decisions were compatible with fundamental human rights, particularly the freedom of association guaranteed by article 11 of the European Convention on Human Rights.

== See also ==
- A Manifesto for Labour Law
- European labour law
- History of trade unions in the United Kingdom
- List of trade unions in the United Kingdom
- Occupational safety and health
- Athena SWAN
- Social law
- US labor law
- Unemployment benefits
- Work–life balance
