= International labour law =

Area of international law

International labour law is the body of rules spanning public and private international law which concern the rights and duties of employees, employers, trade unions and governments in regulating work and the workplace. The International Labour Organization and the World Trade Organization have been the main international bodies involved in reforming labour markets. The International Monetary Fund and the World Bank have indirectly driven changes in labour policy by demanding structural adjustment conditions for receiving loans or grants. Issues regarding Conflict of laws arise, determined by national courts, when people work in more than one country, and supra-national bodies, particularly in the law of the European Union, have a growing body of rules regarding labour rights.

International labour standards refer to conventions agreed upon by international actors, resulting from a series of value judgments, set forth to protect basic worker rights, enhance workers’ job security, and improve their terms of employment on a global scale. The intent of such standards, then, is to establish a worldwide minimum level of protection from inhumane labour practices through the adoption and implementation of said measures. From a theoretical standpoint, it has been maintained, on ethical grounds, that there are certain basic human rights that are universal to humankind. Thus, it is the aim of international labour standards to ensure the provision of such rights in the workplace, such as against workplace aggression, bullying, discrimination and gender inequality on the other hands for working diversity, workplace democracy and empowerment.

While the existence of international labour standards does not necessarily imply implementation or enforcement mechanisms, most real world cases have utilised formal treaties and agreements stemming from international institutions. The primary international agency charged with developing working standards is the International Labour Organization (ILO). Established in 1919, the ILO advocates international standards as essential for the eradication of labour conditions involving "injustice, hardship and privation". According to the ILO, international labour standards contribute to the possibility of lasting peace, help to mitigate potentially adverse effects of international market competition and help the progress of international development.

Implementation, however, is not limited to the ILO nor is it constrained to the legislative model that the ILO represents. Other alternatives include direct trade sanctions, multilateral enforcement, and voluntary standards. In addition to controversies that arise over each of these models, greater issues have also been raised concerning the debate over the need for international labour standards themselves. However, while critics have arisen, the international community has largely come to a consensus in favour of basic protection of the world’s labour force from inhumane practices.

Associated with the development of successful international labour standards is proper monitoring and enforcement of labour standards. Most monitoring occurs through the ILO, but domestic agencies and other NGOs also play a role in the successful monitoring of international labour standards.

== History ==
Since the Industrial Revolution the labour movement has been concerned how economic globalisation would weaken the bargaining power of workers, as their employers could move to hire workers abroad without the protection of the labour standards at home. In the Fourth Annual International Congress in 1869, the following was resolved:

the extension of the principle of free trade, which induces between nations such a competition that the interest of the workman is liable to be lost sight of and sacrificed in the fierce international race between capitalists, demands that such [unions] should be still further extended and made international.

=== Early history ===
The concept of protecting workers from the perils of labour environments dates all the way back to 14th-century Europe. The first example of the modern labor rights movement, though, came in response to the brutal working conditions that accompanied the onset of the Industrial Revolution in the 18th and 19th centuries. In 1802, the Parliament of the United Kingdom passed what is now known as the English Factory Act. The act sought to regulate the workday of apprentices by restricting work hours to 12 per day. In doing so, the English Factory Act served as a precursor to the models of international labour standards seen today. Minimal regulations similar to those found in English legislation subsequently became increasingly commonplace among 19th century industrialising nations. Early attempts at the provision of labour standards were limited in scope, though. Such conventions focused primarily on improving working conditions in relation to hours of work, women's and children's labour, and the use of hazardous materials. While it was evident that support for workers’ rights was inconsistent across international boundaries, activists originally only employed the use of moral suasion to deal with differences in labour standards. It was not until the latter parts of the 19th century that efforts were made to implement uniform standards on an international scale.

=== Creation of ILO ===
Flag of ILO

In 1919, following the end of the First World War, the agenda on international labour standards reached a new level of prominence as a result of the founding of the International Labour Organization. As mandated by Part XIII of the Treaty of Versailles, the ILO was created as a branch of the League of Nations in order to address all conceivable aspects of labour rights. Preliminary efforts focused primarily on the eradication of slavery and all forms of forced labour. The agenda quickly expanded, however, to include the rights to freedom of association and collective bargaining, non-discrimination in employment, and the elimination of child labour. The ILO’s creation marked the first instance of multiple major international actors coming together in an attempt to reach a consensus on universal workers’ rights. Despite a lack of any formal means of coercion, the ILO then urged its 44 original member countries to adopt and ratify conventions limiting oppressive labour market practices.

=== The early years of the ILO ===
In the first two years of the ILO’s existence, 22 international labour conventions were adopted. Some of the topics that the first conventions addressed were "hours of work in industry, unemployment, maternity protection, night work for women, minimum age, and night work for young persons in industry." In 1930, the ILO adopted the first future fundamental convention: the Forced Labour Convention (No.29), which prohibited all forms of forced labour unless exempted by certain conditions. With the onset of the Great Depression, the United States joined the ILO in 1934 noting that complex labour issues would require an international response. Throughout the history of the League of Nations, the ILO is the only League-affiliated organisation that the United States joined. With the backdrop of World War 2, the ILO broadened its mandate with the Declaration of Philadelphia, signed during the 26th general conference session in 1944. The Declaration of Philadelphia, which is attached to the general constitution of the ILO, foreshadows some of the ILO’s earliest future fundamental conventions including the freedom of expression and association which was adopted in 1948 as Convention 87, Freedom of Association and Protection of the Right to Organise Convention.

=== Globalisation and changing divisions of labour ===
In the first half of the 20th century, global divisions of labour were shaped largely by the practices of colonialism. Poorer countries exported natural resources to richer countries, which then manufactured and produced specialised goods. As many colonised nations achieved independence, developing nations in the global South took on increasingly protectionist policies in attempts to build up the manufacturing sectors of their economies, thus marking a shift in the global division of labour. However, towards the latter part of the 20th century, a number of factors saw protectionist measures fall. Such factors included rising labour costs in the north, advances in transportation and communication technologies, the liberalisation of trade, and the deregulation of markets. In the midst of a changing international labour landscape, developing nations in the south took on a previously unseen domination of the labour-intensive manufacturing industry.

With the deregulation of major markets and significant increases in the volume of international trade, attempts to make manufacturing sectors more attractive to retailers saw extreme downward pressure placed on the quality of working conditions in lower income regions of the world. This gave rise to growing concerns about a global race to the bottom, in which governments take part in the iterative loosening of labour protections in attempts to aid the international competitiveness of export-oriented industries. Fears of this nature consequently produced the notable increases in the discourse on international labour ethics that characterise the contemporary international human rights arena.

== Models ==
The traditional model of labour standards regulation has been, for most of history, within-country or within-jurisdiction legislation and enforcement. However, this model may not be appropriate when competitors in a product market are located in different countries or jurisdictions with dissimilar labour standards. This concern opens up the discussion for the establishment of international labour standards, which, in turn, require international regulation, particularly in the context of global trade. However, determining an effective method of implementation of international labor standards has been an area of difficulty and an area that is highly contested. The following sections outline several existing models for the regulation of international labour standards based largely on work by Richard N. Block, Karen Roberts, Cynthia Ozeki and Myron J. Roomkin in their paper titled "Models of International Labour Standards".

=== Legislative ===
The legislative model for implementing a set of international labour standards is the best known. This model involves the enactment and enforcement of labour standards by a legislative body across a union of countries. Social policies regarding employment and labour typically fall into three areas: free movement of labour, prevention of social dumping via low labour standards, and dialogue between labour and management. This model has been adopted by the European Community, part of the European Union, and is also the model taken by the International Labour Organization (ILO). Organisations, such as these, are given the authority, through a series of procedures, to then issue directives in any of these areas of labour policy. Member states must comply with these directives; however, what compliance actually means and entails is left to the discretion of each member state.

=== Direct trade sanctions ===
For over 25 years, there have been links between labour standards and international trade, particularly for specific commodities. The earliest and broadest-based example of linking international labour standards with trade is found in U.S. legislation under the Trade Act of 1974, creating the Generalized System of Preferences (GSP). Under the GSP, the United States was allowed to grant nonreciprocal tariff preference to less developed countries, based on certain country and product eligibility criteria, in order to promote their economic growth and development. Among the country eligibility criteria is affording workers in a country certain internationally recognized rights, similar to the four core conventions established by the ILO. If a complaint or petition is filed against a GSP beneficiary, these are processed through the Office of the United States Trade Representative. Since 1988, eight countries have been suspended or terminated from the GSP program: Burma, Liberia, Maldives, Mauritania, Nicaragua, Pakistan (several products), Sudan and Syria. Four countries have been suspended but subsequently reinstated: Central African Republic, Chile, Paraguay, and Romania. Additionally, Section 2202 of the Omnibus Trade and Competitiveness Act of 1988 requires that the Secretary of State submit to Congress an annual report on the economic policy and trade practices of each country with which the United States has an economic or trade relationship.

The trade sanctions model in the United States, also working as an incentives approach of sorts, appears to have been successful in forcing U.S. officials to encourage countries that are the subject of complaints to address severe violations of labour standards, as defined in the legislation. This model, however, is not designed to be a broad-based guarantee of labour standards among trading partners because it is based on external complaints not the results of monitoring. While it is effective in providing procedural rights, a lower percentage of trading partners provide substantive standards, so this measure has had mixed success. Some hope that implementation in competitor developing countries along with support by complementary domestic policies would allow this model to overall, raise the global social floor.

=== Multilateral enforcement ===
Another example of the various methods of implementation of international labour standards is the multilateral enforcement model. The model, embodied in the North American Agreement on Labor Cooperation (NAALC), is different from other compulsory methods in that it opposes any imposition of common standards schemes. Instead, the multilateral enforcement model requires that signatories to agreements like the NAALC make firm commitments to existing labor standard structures within their respective domestic spheres. The unique aspect of the NAALC, however, is that it does not in any way dictate policy. This includes a strong aversion to uniformly adopted standards on the international level. Rather than encouraging the inclusion of a baseline set of workers’ rights, the multilateral enforcement model merely requires that its members strive to create unbiased administrative bodies that judge whether or not appropriate measures are being taken to ensure the continued support of domestic labour standards. In this manner, the multilateral model is not international in its adoption of a common set of principles, but rather in its level of required commitment to an unspecified group of standards. In enforcing such commitments, agreements like the NAALC primarily utilize recommendations and publicity to make decision makers accountable for their actions. Multilateral enforcement models like the NAALC have experienced mixed results in terms of effectiveness due to their limited powers of influence.

=== Voluntary standards ===
The voluntary standards model makes reference to a system of implementation for labour standards based on a corporate code of conduct. Corporate codes of conduct are adopted when various organizations join together in agreement to operate under a set of socially responsible labour rules. Therefore, this model generally involves voluntary behaviour and self-regulation. An example of voluntary corporate adoption of labour standards is given by the Sullivan Principles in South Africa that were taken on by a group of U.S. companies. Additionally, U.S. apparel retailers, such as Nike, the Gap, and Liz Claiborne, have recently attempted to put in place a system of regulations to prevent their products from being produced under sweatshop conditions.

For this model to be successful, there must be incentive for compliance. The problem, however, is that in the case of labour standards, there are usually high economic incentives to disregard these standards, which are viewed as rises in production costs. For this reason, the monitoring system plays a crucial role in the success and effectiveness of such conditions. In some cases, like the aforementioned Sullivan Principles in South Africa, monitoring has demonstrated the codes’ success. In this case, investors rewarded adherence to the code, as a sign of corporate citizenship. On the other hand, consumers can also punish firms they see as socially irresponsible by means of boycotts or the individual decision to avoid purchase of certain products. The main point of these examples being: where there is strong pressure from investors and consumers to support certain standards, companies may benefit by being seen as upholding accepted morals.

Now, while this is true, it is also true that where costs of complying with stringent standards are high and the sources of consumer pressure diffused, codes are likely to be ineffective. It takes the active involvement and interest of the company, in response to whatever actions have been taken, for this model to be successful. When they choose to respond to outside pressures, companies use means such as public announcements, local religious leaders, human rights activists, university professors, and labor representatives, among others, to implement compliance and a system of monitoring. Another difficulty has been that, while pressure has been effectively pressed on individual firms, it has been difficult to find agreement at an industry level, in terms of corporate codes.

Finally, a variation of the voluntary standards models is one of certification, which began in October 1997 with the issuance of SA (Social Accountability) 8000 by the Council on Economic Priorities Accrediting Agency (CEPAA). SA8000 is an example of a corporate certification process for social responsibility and labor standards. This certification process has the purpose of identifying corporations that comply with certain criteria based on social accountability requirements, including criteria for child labor and worker health and safety. The resulting certification then serves the purpose of assuring customers that goods and services provided by certified firms have been produced by workers who are offered labour standards that meet at least a minimally acceptable level.

== International Labour Organization ==
The International Labour Organization (ILO) is a specialised agency of the United Nations, consisting of 187 member countries, that deals with labour issues. Following World War I, the Treaty of Versailles contained the first constitution of a new International Labour Organization founded on the principle that "labour is not a commodity", and for the reason that "peace can be established only if it is based upon social justice". The primary role of the ILO has been to coordinate principles of international labour law by issuing Conventions, which codify labour laws on all matters. Members of the ILO can voluntarily adopt and ratify the conventions by enacting the rules in their domestic law. For instance, the first Hours of Work (Industry) Convention, 1919 requires a maximum of a 48-hour week, and has been ratified by 52 out of 185 member states. The UK ultimately refused to ratify the Convention, as did many current EU members states, although the Working Time Directive adopts its principles, subject to the individual opt-out. The present constitution of the ILO comes from the Declaration of Philadelphia 1944, and under the Declaration on Fundamental Principles and Rights at Work 1998 classified eight conventions as core. Together these require freedom to join a union, bargain collectively and take action (Conventions Nos 87 and 98) abolition of forced labour (29 and 105) abolition labour by children before the end of compulsory school (138 and 182) and no discrimination at work (Nos 100 and 111). Compliance with the core Conventions is obligatory from the fact of membership, even if the country has not ratified the Convention in question. To ensure compliance, the ILO is limited to gathering evidence and reporting on member states' progress, so that publicity will put public and international pressure to reform the laws. Global reports on core standards are produced yearly, while individual reports on countries who have ratified other Conventions are compiled on a bi-annual or perhaps less frequent basis.

The ILO, by its existence, is the recognised international vehicle for raising international labour standards issues in a worldwide forum. No other model in existence is capable of performing this role. This organisation establishes labour standards by means of both conventions and recommendations and has a tripartite governing structure – representing government, employers and workers. While ILO recommendations take more of the role of providing mere guidance to member states, the stronger form, ILO conventions, have the status of a treaty, which, in principle, is binding on the member countries that voluntarily ratify them. These represent benchmarks of strong labour standards towards which countries can strive by promulgating and enforcing national laws that comply with the conventions. It is through these means that the organisation works to enforce international labour standards.

In 1998, the ILO International Labour Conference adopted the “Declaration on Fundamental Principles and Rights at Work” defining certain rights as “fundamental.” The Declaration commits member states to respect and promote these main principles, referred to as the core conventions, which are grouped into the following four categories (total of eight ILO conventions): freedom of association and the effective recognition of the right to collective bargaining, the elimination of forced or compulsory labour, the abolition of child labour, and the elimination of discrimination in respect of employment and occupation. The Declaration claims these rights to be universal, applying to all people in all States – regardless of level of economic development. The International Labour Conference regards these principles as so important that all member counties are obligated to comply with them, regardless of ratification status.

Alongside the fundamental conventions, the ILO has also identified four priority conventions or governance conventions. Crucial to the running of the international labour standards systems implemented by the ILO, the ILO recommends that member states ratify the following priority conventions: the Labour Inspection Convention (1947), the Labour Inspection (Agriculture) Convention (1969), the Triparte Consultation (International Labour Standards) Convention (1976), and the Employment Policy Convention (1964).

Issues with the ILO’s approach to implementing international labour standards come down to a question of universality amongst the conventions and member countries, with some arguing that flexibility is necessary to meet the needs of developing countries. These concerns gather around the idea that the race to expand exports or attract foreign investment can cause competition on the basis of labour costs, leading to a decline in international labour standards as governments either dismantle national laws that protect workers or weaken the enforcement of these laws. The underlying issue here is the connection between national incomes and the standards a country can feasibly support while remaining competitive. Other issues involve enforcement of these standards following ratification. The ILO provides a vehicle for investigating cases of noncompliance through representations, filed by employer or worker organisations, or complaints, lodged by another member that also ratified the convention. These are then sent to a committee that launches an investigation and report. This is followed by either acceptance of recommendations on steps the government may take to address the complaint or the request to submit the case to the International Court of Justice. Failure to comply may result in an incurred sanction from the organization.

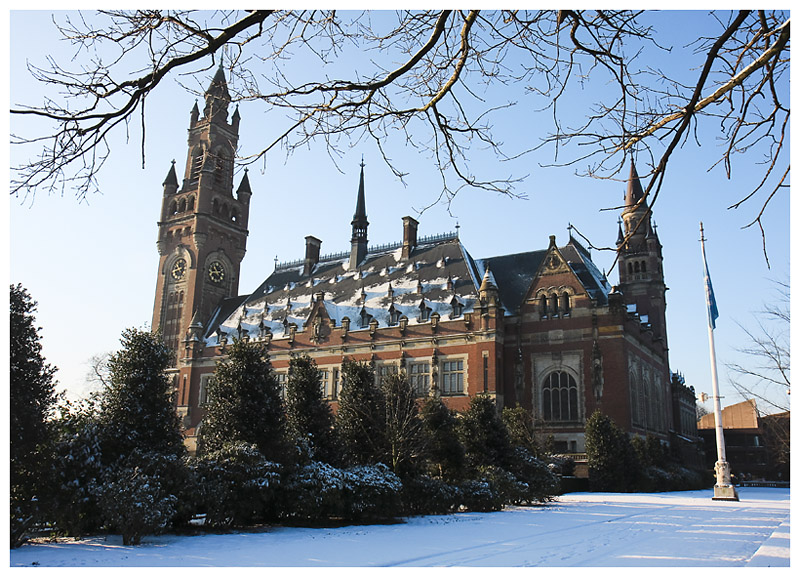
Peace Palace, the headquarters for the International Court of Justice

Overall, the ILO structure essentially created a system of voluntary compliance with labor standards based on ratification of the established conventions. In general the enforcement system of representation and complaints has been successful – success being measured by the fact that only one representation or complaint has reached the most severe sanction. On the other hand, due to the absence of strong sanctions, the ILO lacks a strong enough deterrent factor for countries inclined to violate the standards the ILO upholds. Further, the “flexibility” of standards allows too much leeway for adaptation based on independent circumstances, diminishing the force of the conventions.

== World Trade Organization ==
As one of the only international organisations with real enforcement power through trade sanctions, the WTO has been the target for calls by labour lawyers to incorporate global standards of the International Labour Organization.

Because the ILOs enforcement and sanction mechanisms are weak, there has been significant discussion about incorporating labour standards in the World Trade Organization's operation, since its formation in 1994. The WTO oversees, primarily, the General Agreement on Tariffs and Trade which is a treaty aimed at reducing customs, tariffs and other barriers to free import and export of goods, services and capital between its 157-member countries. Unlike for the ILO, if the WTO rules on trade are contravened, member states who secure a judgment by the Dispute Settlement procedures (effective a judicial process) may retaliate through trade sanctions. This could include reimposition of targeted tariffs against the non-compliant country. Proponents of an integrated approach have called for a "social clause" to be inserted into the GATT agreements, for example by amending article XX, which gives an exception to the general trade barrier reduction rules allowing imposition of sanctions for breaches of human rights. An explicit reference to core labour standards could allow action where a WTO member state is found to be in breach of ILO standards. Opponents argue that such an approach could backfire and undermine labour rights, as a country's industries, and therefore its workforce, are necessarily harmed but without any guarantee that labour reform would take place. Furthermore, it was argued in the Singapore Ministerial Declaration 1996 that "the comparative advantage of countries, particularly low-age developing countries, must in no way be put into question." Accordingly, it is argued that countries ought to be able to take advantage of low wages and poor conditions at work as a comparative advantage in order to boost their exports. Similarly it is disputed that business will relocate production to low wage countries from higher wage countries such as the UK, because that choice depends mostly on productivity of workers. The view of many labour lawyers and economists remains that more trade, in the context of weaker bargaining power and mobility for workers, still allows for business to opportunistically take advantage of workers by moving production, and that a coordinated multilateral approach with targeted measures against specific exports is preferable. While the WTO has yet to incorporate labour rights into its procedures for dispute settlements, many countries began to make bilateral agreements that protected core labour standards instead. Moreover, in domestic tariff regulations not yet touched by the WTO agreements, countries have given preference to other countries who do respect core labour rights, for example under the EU Tariff Preference Regulation, articles 7 and 8.

== Workers in multiple countries ==
While the debate over labour standards applied by the ILO and the WTO seeks to balance standards with free movement of capital globally, conflicts of laws (or private international law) issues arise where workers move from home to go abroad. If a worker from America performs part of her job in Brazil, China and Denmark (a "peripatetic" worker) or if a worker is engaged in Ecuador to work as an expatriate abroad in France, an employer may seek to characterise the contract of employment as being governed by the law of the country where labour rights are least favourable to the worker, or seek to argue that the most favourable system of labour rights does not apply. For example, in a UK labour law case, Ravat v Halliburton Manufacturing and Services Ltd Mr Ravat was from the UK but was employed in Libya by a German company that was part of the American multinational oil conglomerate, Halliburton. He was dismissed by a supervisor based in Egypt. He was told he would be hired under UK law terms and conditions, and this was arranged by a staffing department in Aberdeen. Under the UK Employment Rights Act 1996 he would have a right to unfair dismissal, but the Act left open what the territorial scope of the statute was. The UK Supreme Court held that the principle would be that for an expatriate worker, although the general rule is that they will not have UK labour law rights, there would be an exception if the worker could show a "close connection" to the UK, and this was established through the contractual assurances given to Mr Rabat.

This fits within the general framework in the EU. Under the EU Rome I Regulation article 8, workers will have employment rights of the country where they habitually work. But exceptionally they may have a claim in another country if they can establish a close connection to it. The Regulation emphasises that the rules should be applied with the purpose of protecting the worker.

It is also necessary that a court has jurisdiction to hear a claim. Under the Brussels I Regulation article 19, this requires the worker habitually works in the place where the claim is brought, or is engaged there.

== European Union law ==
The European Community (EC) is a multigovernmental legislative structure that, through the Treaty of European Union (Maastricht) in 1992, the Treaty of Amsterdam in 1997, and various other agreements has promoted full economic integration of its member states. While it has issued a number of directives in non-labour areas, the same cannot be said for matters concerning social policy and labour. However, some restrictions regarding health and safety have been adopted by the EC in an attempt to mitigate any inhumane practices, involving low health and safety standards, used for the sake of a competitive advantage.

The European Union, unlike most international organisations, has an extensive system of labour laws, but officially excluding (according to the Treaty on the Functioning of the European Union) matters around direct wage regulation (e.g. setting a minimum wage), fairness of dismissals (e.g. a requirement for elected workers to approve dismissals) and collective bargaining. A series of Directives regulate almost all other issues, for instance the Working Time Directive guarantees 28 days of paid holiday, the Equality Framework Directive prohibits all forms of discrimination for people performing work, and the Collective Redundancies Directive requires that proper notice is given and consultation takes place before any decisions about economic dismissals are finalised.

However, the European Court of Justice has recently expanded upon the Treaties through its case law. As well as having legal protection for workers rights, an objective of trade unions has been to organise their members across borders in the same way that multinational corporations have organised their production globally. In order to meet the balance of power that comes from ability of businesses to dismiss workers or relocate, unions have sought to take collective action and strikes internationally. However, this kind of coordination was recently challenged in the European Union in two controversial decisions. In Laval Ltd v Swedish Builders Union a group of Latvian workers were sent to a construction site in Sweden on low pay. The local Swedish Union took industrial action to make Laval Ltd sign up to the local collective agreement. Under the Posted Workers Directive, article 3 lays down minimum standards for workers being posted away from home so that workers always receive at least the minimum rights that they would have at home in case their place of work has lower minimum rights. Article 3(7) goes on to say that this "shall not prevent application of terms and conditions of employment which are more favourable to workers". Most people thought this meant that more favourable conditions could be given than the minimum (e.g. in Latvian law) by the host state's legislation or a collective agreement. However, in an interpretation seen as astonishing by many, the ECJ said that only the posting state could raise standards beyond its minimum for posted workers, and any attempt by the host state, or a collective agreement (unless the collective agreement is declared universal under article 3(8)) would be an infringement of the business' freedom to provide services under TFEU article 56. This decision was implicitly reversed by the European Union legislature in the Rome I Regulation, which makes clear in recital 34 that the host state may allow more favourable standards. However, in The Rosella, the ECJ also held that a blockade by the International Transport Workers' Federation against a business that was using an Estonian flag of convenience (i.e. saying it was operating under Estonian law to avoid labour standards of Finland) infringed the business' right of free establishment under TFEU article 49. The ECJ said that it recognised the workers' "right to strike" in accordance with ILO Convention 87, but said that its use must be proportionately to the right of the business' establishment. The result is that the European Court of Justice's recent decisions create a significant imbalance between the international freedom of business, and that of labour, to bargain and take action to defend their interests.

For those members within the EC who favour the implementation of labour standards, there has been a push to ease the decision-making barriers to social legislation. On 7 February, 1992, the signing of the Maastricht Treaty made it easier to pass legislation on less controversial issues, such as health and safety, nondiscrimination, and consultation with workers.

While the EC provides a structure for enacting legislation that applies across counties, the extent to which it can actually create international labour standards, even within its own confines, is limited. While these directives allow for labour concerns to be brought above the national level, the presence of philosophical differences among member states as well as constraints on state autonomy demonstrate barriers to this model. However, despite these difficulties and a complex decision-making structure designed to include consultation with the governments of all member states, the various EC policy-making institutions and the related parties have succeeded in creating cross-national legislation for labour standards under its social policy umbrella. Consequently, this model, as demonstrated by the EC, is a viable one for establishing labour standards on a cross-national basis. The difficulty lies in the duplication of this model elsewhere, due to the EC’s unique, integrated community that is the only such general multinational standard system in the world today.

== Monitoring ==
A crucial element to the success of international labour standards is proper monitoring and enforcement. When monitoring international labor standards, agencies rely on three major types of information: information from international organisations, like the ILO, information from national agencies, and information from non-governmental organizations. Upon locating and determining the necessary data, monitoring agencies then need to process and sift through the results to analyze compliance with certain international labor standards. Finally after compliance analysis, recommendations and required adjustments are then communicated to the concerned party.

=== Data sources ===
One of the major sources of data necessary for the monitoring of international labour standards is the International Labour Organization. According to Article 22 of the ILO Constitution, “each of the members agrees to make an annual report to the International Labour Office on the measures which it has taken to give effect to the provisions of Conventions to which it is a party.” Specifically, countries are mandated to prepare a report every two years for the Core Labour Standards of the ILO and every five years for all other active conventions that the country has ratified, which are submitted, to the Committee of Experts on the Application of Conventions and Recommendations and the Conference Committee on the Application of Standards. For conventions that have not yet been ratified by the country, Article 19 of the ILO Constitution mandates countries to demonstrate on regular intervals steps “they have taken to give effect to any provision of certain conventions or recommendations, and to indicate any obstacles which have prevented or delayed the ratification of a particular convention.” All of the above combine to form the ILO’s regular system of supervision.

Flag of the United Nations

The ILO also has a special procedures type of supervisory mechanism where complaints levelled against member states and freedom of association complaints are dealt with. Under articles 24 and 26 of the ILO Constitution, different groups of people may indicate to the governing body that a certain state is not complying with an international labor standard that they have previously ratified. Within the ILO framework, the labor standard regarding the freedom to associate has also received a special priority which allows complaints to be brought up to the governing body even if the state has not ratified the conventions regarding the freedom of association.

Other international organisations like the United Nations and the World Bank also monitor international labour standards. The United Nations largely relies on self-reported data from member states. These data points are used to determine whether or not member states are meeting the requirements of international treaties agreed to by the United Nations. Given that the ILO is a subset of the UN, generally, more detailed labour standards data and compliance records are located within the realm of the ILO. The World Bank incorporates the international standards set by the ILO as one of the factors behind assistance to member states.

National agencies and NGOs also monitor international labour standards. National agencies generally report on domestic compliance of international labour standards while NGOs are much more diverse in their scope.

=== Challenges ===
Several challenges, however, exist in the monitoring of international labour standards. The ILO and other international organisations generally rely on self-reporting data from countries. Some analysts have questioned the quality and neutrality of these sources of data. For example, definitions of what constitutes unemployment vary from country to country making it difficult to compare data and to judge data quality. Additionally, despite the large amount of data, there are still gaps in their coverage. Coverage is greatest in the urban environments and the formal sector. Conversely, gaps exist in the coverage of rural environments and informal sectors which can positively skew the labour statistics that countries report.

Challenges also exist in the usage of data to assess compliance with various international labour standards. As interest continues to grow in the monitoring and enforcement of international labour standards, an assessment, according to the National Research Council, “requires careful analysis of what the core labor standards mean and imply, how to determine when a country is or is not in compliance, what indicators of compliance and which sources of information to use, and limitations of the sources of information.” Standardisation will be necessary to allow proper and effective monitoring of labor standards.

== Violations ==
=== Workplace discrimination ===
Workplace discrimination, overt and covert, is an example of violations of international labour standards. The ILO defines workplace discrimination as “treating people differently because of certain characteristics, such as race, colour, or sex, which results in the impairment of equality and of opportunity and treatment.” An overt example of workplace discrimination is unequal pay, especially between men and women. Though recognized as an example of workplace discrimination since 1919, the gender pay gap, often a measurement of unequal pay, is estimated to be 22.9%, which means that for every dollar earned by a man, a woman, in the same position would earn 77.1 cents. Despite the fact that the ILO proposes that there are many benefits to reducing and eliminating the gender pay gap, at the current, slow rates of gender pay reduction, the ILO estimates that “another 75 years will be needed to bridge this gap.”

Job security is another arena where workplace discrimination can be found. In some developing countries, like Bangladesh, job insecurity reflects patriarchal societies that have diminished women’s options. Currently in Bangladesh, of the 1.8 million workers in garment factories, 1.5 million are women. From the perspective of the factory owners, the advantage of hiring woman is the “docility that comes with disadvantage.” Women have fewer opportunities than men when it comes to decent, respectable employment. For many of these women, if they were to lose their jobs at the garment factories, they would be forced into poverty or work in the informal sector, like prostitution.

Other forms of discrimination, outside of gender discrimination, include discrimination based on race & ethnicity, age, religion, political opinions, social origins, disabilities, sexual orientations, genetics, and lifestyle. The ILO identifies all these forms of discrimination as violations of international labor standards.

=== Child labour ===
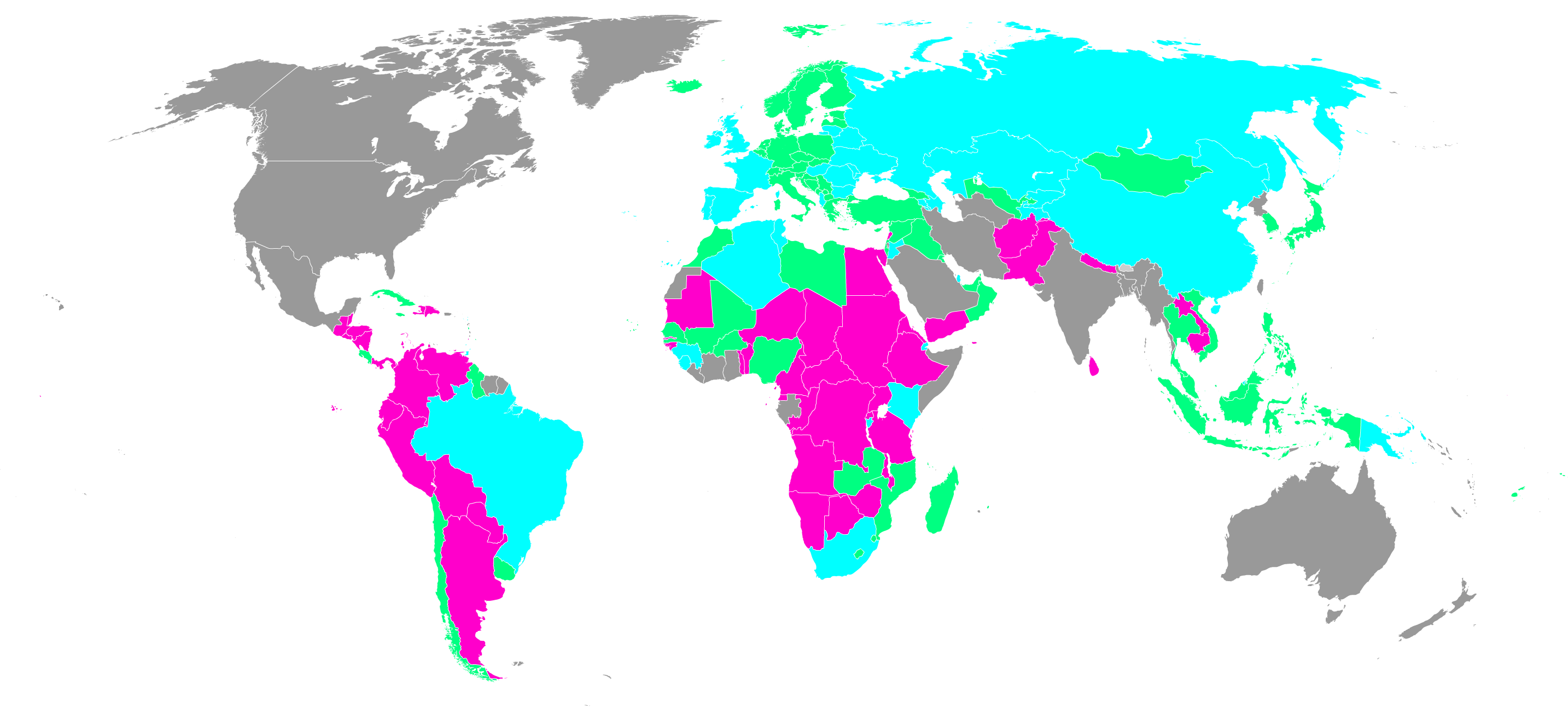
Parties to ILO's 1973 Minimum Age Convention, and the minimum ages they have designated: purple, 14 years; green, 15 years; blue, 16 years

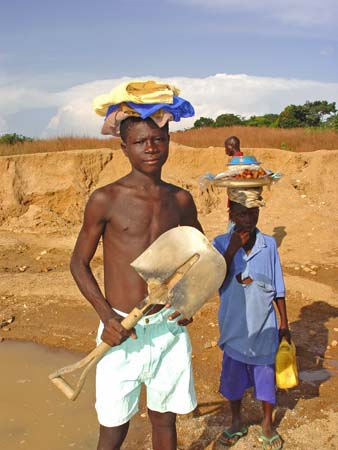
Young diamond miners in Sierra Leone

According to the ILO, child labor is “work that deprives children of their childhood, their potential and their dignity, and that is harmful to physical and mental development.” The ILO classifies work conducted by children into three categories: children in employment, child labor, and hazardous work. The ILO condemns both child labor and hazardous work with the goal of eliminating hazardous child labor by 2016. In 2012, the ILO estimated that 168 million children (11% of the world’s children) were engaged in child labour, of which, 85 million engaged in hazardous work. ILO Convention No. 5 adopted in 1919 and entered into force in 1921 was the first ILO convention regulating child labour. Specifically, the main provision of the article stated “children under the age of fourteen years shall not be employed or work in any public or private industrial undertaking.” Since its inception in 1919, several other ILO conventions had been adopted that have modified and expanded the initial 1919 convention. Today, the C138 Minimum Age Convention, 1973 and C182 Worst Forms of Child Labour Convention 1999 have replaced all the previous conventions. The Minimum Age Convention defines the minimum age children are allowed to work. Children, unless under special allowances, are not allowed to engage in hazardous work until the age of 18. The basic minimum age for child labor is 15 (14 for developing countries), and the minimum wage for light work, which may not interfere with education or vocational orientation and training, is 13 (12 for developing countries). C182 urges all governments to take immediate action to identify and eliminate the worst forms of child labour. The following are defined as hazardous work according to the ILO:

- “Work which exposes children to physical, psychological, or sexual abuse
- Work underground, underwater, at dangerous heights, or in confined spaces
- Work with dangerous machinery, equipment, and tools, or which involves the manual handling or transport of heavy loads
- Work in an unhealthy environment which may, for example, expose children to hazardous substances, agents, or processes, or to temperatures, noise levels, or vibrations, damaging to their health
- Work under particularly difficult conditions such as work for long hours or during the night or work where the child is unreasonably confined to the premises of the employer”

The majority of UN Member States has ratified both C138 and C182. The Worst Forms of Child Labour Convention (C182) has been ratified by all 187 member states of the ILO, making it a "universal ratification" that proves there is an existing international allegiance which deems society should not hold space for the terrible forms of child labour. The Minimum Age Convention (C138) has been ratified by 167 countries, while 16 countries have yet to ratify it. Notably, Australia, the United States, and Bangladesh, are all member states that have not ratified the Minimum Age Convention (C138).

=== Unsafe labour practices ===
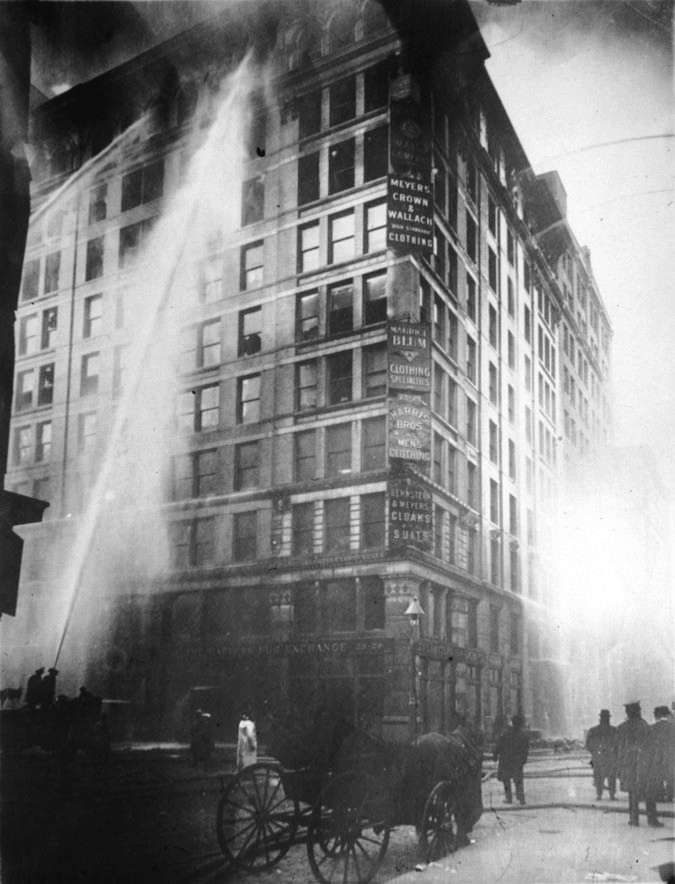
Triangle Shirtwaist Factory fire on March 25, 1911

Operating under the mantra that “decent work is safe work,” the ILO Programme on Safety and Health at Work and the Environment, SafeWork, has the goal of making work safer for all. According to the ILO, someone dies from a work-related accident or disease every 15 seconds. Unsafe labour practices have a long, sordid history. From the 1911 Triangle Shirtwaist Factory fire to the 2013 fertilizer explosion in West, Texas, industrial disasters negatively affect the lives of workers and their dependents with high associated economic costs. Since its creation in 1919, ensuring worker safety has been one of the ILO’s fundamental missions. The ILO has over its history adopted several conventions that have the goal of maximising worker safety and health. Currently, there are three fundamental conventions that are in effect: the Occupation Safety and Health Convention (C155, 1981), the Occupational Health Services Convention (C161, 1985), and the Promotional Framework for Occupational Safety and Health Convention (C187, 2006). The most recent convention has the stated aim of “promoting a preventative safety and health culture and progressively achieving a safe and healthy working environment.” One challenge that the ILO faces is the low ratification levels of the fundamental health and safety conventions. C155, C161, and C187 have been ratified by 60, 31, and 25 nations respectively. From the perspective of the ILO failing to meet the expectations delineated in the conventions are examples of international labor standards violations.

== Criticisms ==
In addition to disagreements about the appropriate method of implementation for international labour standards, there are dissenting opinions concerning the validity of their existence at all. The two most common arguments raised against international labour standards are that they undermine international competitiveness and erode domestic policy.

=== Undermines international competitiveness ===
A critique of international labour standards historically raised by right-of-centre economists is that they distort market forces, thus inhibiting employment and income. According to right-wing economists, global free trade allows countries to specialise in those activities in which they have a comparative advantage and to reap mutual gains through exchange. The international competitiveness of countries with large amounts of unskilled labour depends on their ability to provide low-cost workers. Therefore, international standards would undermine any comparative advantage by increasing the cost of labour. According to the conservative argument, international labour standards leave developing nations with a diminished export economy.

Supporters of international labour standards often respond by arguing that this critique only attacks a particular aspect of enforcement rather than the standards themselves. Furthermore, left-of-centre economists suggest that higher labour standards do not necessarily undermine competitiveness. Empirical evidence provided by Berik and Rodgers (2006) suggests that any costs of raising labour standards can easily be offset by incentives encouraging foreign direct investment (FDI) and exports. Following this line of argument, not only do higher labour standards improve social and political stability, thus encouraging more foreign investment, but they also provide valuable investments in human capital that can lead to efficiency gains.

=== Erodes domestic policy ===
Another prominent argument against international labour standards is the notion that any attempt to harmonise set benchmarks for acceptable working conditions disregards, to some extent, the current state of an individual country’s unique economic and social climates. It is suggested that rather than adopting an internationally agreed upon group of labour standards, sovereign states are better off leaving labour market regulation to domestic policy. In this way, it is argued, a country can tailor a standard such as a minimum wage to the specific situation in that area of the world rather than trying to implement an ill-fitting uniform wage. In a 1996 study, Drusilla Brown, Alan Deardorff and Robert Stern use a variety of theoretical labour models to test the effectiveness of the harmonisation of international labour standards. The study concludes that in theoretical cases, market failures that allow a breakdown in working environment conditions are most adequately remedied by labour standards. However, market failures are not uniform across countries and so it stands to reason that labour standards should not be constructed in an international way.

An example of this critique can be seen by looking at the issue of child labour practices. The case against harmonised international labour rights makes the point that the amount of child labour in a country is directly dependent on its level of economic development. Following this line of reasoning, poorer countries have a better chance at abolishing child labour through economic development rather than minimum age requirements. In fact, one study found that children 14 years and younger are not completely withdrawn from the labour force until GDP approaches $5000 per capita. Additionally, it is also argued that international consensuses that disparage child labor practices can actually reduce the likelihood of eradicating child labour altogether by weakening incentives for adult workers to support a ban.

== See also ==
- Decent work
- Labor law
- International Labour Organization
- International law
- Capability approach
- Human rights
- Right to work
- Work intensity
- International Labour Organization conventions
- Social inequality
- UK labour law
