= International Transport Workers' Federation v Viking Line ABP =

The Rosella
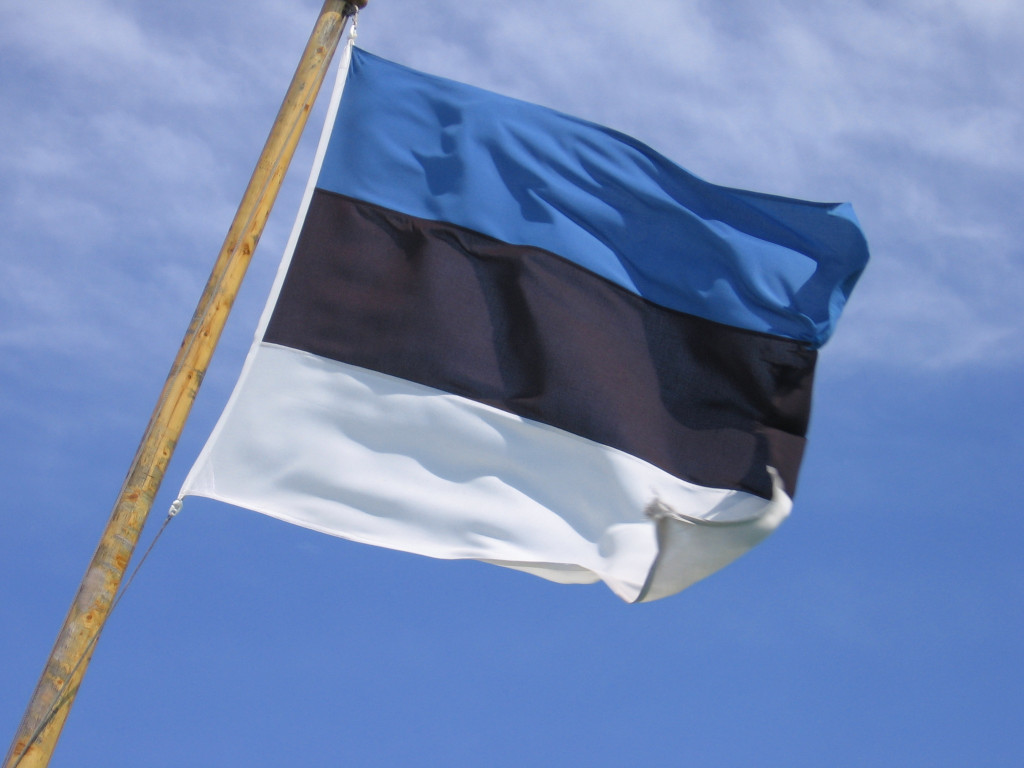
- Court: European Court of Justice
- Full case name: The International Transport Workers' Federation and The Finnish Seamen's Union v Viking Line ABP and OÜ Viking Line Eesti
- Decided: 11 December 2007

Case history
- Prior actions: [2005] EWCA Civ 1299 and [2005] EWHC 1222 (Comm)

Court membership
- Judges sitting: V Skouris, P Jann, A Rosas, K Lenaerts, U Lõhmus, L Bay Larsen, R Schintgen, R Silva de Lapuerta, K Schiemann, J Makarczyk, P Kūris, E Levits and A Ó Caoimh

Case opinions
- AG Maduro's Opinion, 23 May 2007

Keywords
- Right to strike, Freedom of establishment

International Transport Workers' Federation v Viking Line ABP (2007) C-438/05 is an EU law case of the European Court of Justice, in which it was held that there is a positive right to strike, but the exercise of that right could infringe a business's freedom of establishment under the Treaty on the Functioning of the European Union article 49 (ex Article 43 TEC). Often called The Rosella case or the Viking case, it is relevant to all labour law within the European Union (which at the time included UK labour law). The decision has been criticised for the Court's inarticulate line of reasoning, and its disregard of fundamental human rights.

The Rosella case was shortly followed by a case on freedom to provide services called Laval un Partneri Ltd v Svenska Byggnadsarbetareförbundet, and by the influential European Court of Human Rights decision in Demir and Baykara v Turkey.

== Facts ==
Viking Line ABP operated a ship called The Rosella between Estonia and Finland. It wanted to operate under the Estonian flag so that it could use Estonian workers on lower wages than the higher Finnish wages for the existing crew. The policy of the International Transport Workers' Federation (ITWF) was to oppose such "reflagging" for convenience by companies registering their ship abroad in a low labour cost jurisdiction, when their real seat is in another country. The Finnish Seamen's Union, a member of the ITWF, planned industrial action. The ITWF told its partners not to negotiate with Viking and hinder its business. Viking Line ABP responded by seeking an injunction in the English courts, claiming that the industrial action would infringe its right to freedom of establishment under TEC art 43, now TFEU art 49.

The High Court of Justice granted the injunction, but the Court of Appeal of England and Wales overturned the injunction on the balance of convenience. It held that there were important issues of EU law to be heard, given that, in the words of Waller LJ, it affected the "fundamental rights of workers to take industrial action". So it made a TEC article 234 reference (now article 267) to the European Court of Justice.

== Judgment ==
The European Court of Justice held that, though it was for the national court to ultimately answer the question, it was possible that collective action taken by workers to protect their interests could be unlawful because it infringed the employer's interests under TFEU article 56. It could not be the case, in this situation that the workers' interests were sufficiently threatened, because the ECJ felt that the jobs and conditions of the workers' employment were not 'jeopardised or under serious threat'. It was the case that 'the right to take collective action, including the right to strike, must... be recognised as a fundamental right which forms an integral part of the general principles of Community law', but 'the exercise of that right may nonetheless be subject to certain restrictions... in accordance with Community law and national law and practices.'

42 Next, according to the observations of the Danish and Swedish Governments, the right to take collective action, including the right to strike, constitutes a fundamental right which, as such, falls outside the scope of Article 43 EC.

43 In that regard, it must be recalled that the right to take collective action, including the right to strike, is recognised both by various international instruments which the Member States have signed or cooperated in, such as the European Social Charter, signed at Turin on 18 October 1961 – to which, moreover, express reference is made in Article 136 EC – and Convention No 87 concerning Freedom of Association and Protection of the Right to Organise, adopted on 9 July 1948 by the International Labour Organization – and by instruments developed by those Member States at Community level or in the context of the European Union, such as the Community Charter of the Fundamental Social Rights of Workers adopted at the meeting of the European Council held in Strasbourg on 9 December 1989, which is also referred to in Article 136 EC, and the Charter of Fundamental Rights of the European Union proclaimed in Nice on 7 December 2000 (OJ 2000 C 364, p. 1).

44 Although the right to take collective action, including the right to strike, must therefore be recognised as a fundamental right which forms an integral part of the general principles of Community law the observance of which the Court ensures, the exercise of that right may none the less be subject to certain restrictions. As is reaffirmed by Article 28 of the Charter of Fundamental Rights of the European Union, those rights are to be protected in accordance with Community law and national law and practices. In addition, as is apparent from paragraph 5 of this judgment, under Finnish law the right to strike may not be relied on, in particular, where the strike is contra bonos mores or is prohibited under national law or Community law.

45 In that regard, the Court has already held that the protection of fundamental rights is a legitimate interest which, in principle, justifies a restriction of the obligations imposed by Community law, even under a fundamental freedom guaranteed by the Treaty, such as the free movement of goods (see Case C‑112/00 Schmidberger [2003] ECR I‑5659, paragraph 74) or freedom to provide services (see Case C‑36/02 Omega [2004] ECR I‑9609, paragraph 35).

46 However, in Schmidberger and Omega, the Court held that the exercise of the fundamental rights at issue, that is, freedom of expression and freedom of assembly and respect for human dignity, respectively, does not fall outside the scope of the provisions of the Treaty and considered that such exercise must be reconciled with the requirements relating to rights protected under the Treaty and in accordance with the principle of proportionality (see, to that effect, Schmidberger, paragraph 77, and Omega, paragraph 36).

47 It follows from the foregoing that the fundamental nature of the right to take collective action is not such as to render Article 43 EC inapplicable to the collective action at issue in the main proceedings....

The existence of restrictions

68 The Court must first point out, as it has done on numerous occasions, that freedom of establishment constitutes one of the fundamental principles of the Community and that the provisions of the Treaty guaranteeing that freedom have been directly applicable since the end of the transitional period. Those provisions secure the right of establishment in another Member State not merely for Community nationals but also for the companies or firms referred to in Article 48 EC (Case 81/87 Daily Mail and General Trust [1988] ECR 5483, paragraph 15).

69 Furthermore, the Court has considered that, even though the provisions of the Treaty concerning freedom of establishment are directed mainly to ensuring that foreign nationals and companies are treated in the host Member State in the same way as nationals of that State, they also prohibit the Member State of origin from hindering the establishment in another Member State of one of its nationals or of a company incorporated under its legislation which also comes within the definition contained in Article 48 EC. The rights guaranteed by Articles 43 EC to 48 EC would be rendered meaningless if the Member State of origin could prohibit undertakings from leaving in order to establish themselves in another Member State (Daily Mail and General Trust, paragraph 16).

70 Secondly, according to the settled case-law of the Court, the definition of establishment within the meaning of those articles of the Treaty involves the actual pursuit of an economic activity through a fixed establishment in another Member State for an indefinite period and registration of a vessel cannot be separated from the exercise of the freedom of establishment where the vessel serves as a vehicle for the pursuit of an economic activity that includes fixed establishment in the State of registration (Case C‑221/89 Factortame and Others [1991] ECR I‑3905, paragraphs 20 to 22).

71 The Court concluded from this that the conditions laid down for the registration of vessels must not form an obstacle to freedom of establishment within the meaning of Articles 43 EC to 48 EC (Factortame and Others, paragraph 23).

72 In the present case, first, it cannot be disputed that collective action such as that envisaged by FSU has the effect of making less attractive, or even pointless, as the national court has pointed out, Viking's exercise of its right to freedom of establishment, inasmuch as such action prevents both Viking and its subsidiary, Viking Eesti, from enjoying the same treatment in the host Member State as other economic operators established in that State.

73 Secondly, collective action taken in order to implement ITF's policy of combating the use of flags of convenience, which seeks, primarily, as is apparent from ITF's observations, to prevent shipowners from registering their vessels in a State other than that of which the beneficial owners of those vessels are nationals, must be considered to be at least liable to restrict Viking's exercise of its right of freedom of establishment.

74 It follows that collective action such as that at issue in the main proceedings constitutes a restriction on freedom of establishment within the meaning of Article 43 EC.

Justification of the restrictions

75 It is apparent from the case-law of the Court that a restriction on freedom of establishment can be accepted only if it pursues a legitimate aim compatible with the Treaty and is justified by overriding reasons of public interest. But even if that were the case, it would still have to be suitable for securing the attainment of the objective pursued and must not go beyond what is necessary in order to attain it (see, inter alia, Case C‑55/94 Gebhard [1995] ECR I‑4165, paragraph 37, and Bosman, paragraph 104).

76 ITF, supported, in particular, by the German Government, Ireland and the Finnish Government, maintains that the restrictions at issue in the main proceedings are justified since they are necessary to ensure the protection of a fundamental right recognised under Community law and their objective is to protect the rights of workers, which constitutes an overriding reason of public interest.

77 In that regard, it must be observed that the right to take collective action for the protection of workers is a legitimate interest which, in principle, justifies a restriction of one of the fundamental freedoms guaranteed by the Treaty (see, to that effect, Schmidberger, paragraph 74) and that the protection of workers is one of the overriding reasons of public interest recognised by the Court (see, inter alia, Joined Cases C‑369/96 and C‑376/96 Arblade and Others [1999] ECR I‑8453, paragraph 36; Case C‑165/98 Mazzoleni and ISA [2001] ECR I‑2189, paragraph 27; and Joined Cases C‑49/98, C‑50/98, C‑52/98 to C‑54/98 and C‑68/98 to C‑71/98 Finalarte and Others [2001] ECR I‑7831, paragraph 33).

78 It must be added that, according to Article 3(1)(c) and (j) EC, the activities of the Community are to include not only an 'internal market characterised by the abolition, as between Member States, of obstacles to the free movement of goods, persons, services and capital', but also 'a policy in the social sphere'. Article 2 EC states that the Community is to have as its task, inter alia, the promotion of 'a harmonious, balanced and sustainable development of economic activities' and 'a high level of employment and of social protection'.

79 Since the Community has thus not only an economic but also a social purpose, the rights under the provisions of the Treaty on the free movement of goods, persons, services and capital must be balanced against the objectives pursued by social policy, which include, as is clear from the first paragraph of Article 136 EC, inter alia, improved living and working conditions, so as to make possible their harmonisation while improvement is being maintained, proper social protection and dialogue between management and labour.

80 In the present case, it is for the national court to ascertain whether the objectives pursued by FSU and ITF by means of the collective action which they initiated concerned the protection of workers.

81 First, as regards the collective action taken by FSU, even if that action – aimed at protecting the jobs and conditions of employment of the members of that union liable to be adversely affected by the reflagging of the Rosella – could reasonably be considered to fall, at first sight, within the objective of protecting workers, such a view would no longer be tenable if it were established that the jobs or conditions of employment at issue were not jeopardised or under serious threat.

82 This would be the case, in particular, if it transpired that the undertaking referred to by the national court in its 10th question was, from a legal point of view, as binding as the terms of a collective agreement and if it was of such a nature as to provide a guarantee to the workers that the statutory provisions would be complied with and the terms of the collective agreement governing their working relationship maintained.

83 In so far as the exact legal scope to be attributed to an undertaking such as that referred to in the 10th question is not clear from the order for reference, it is for the national court to determine whether the jobs or conditions of employment of that trade union's members who are liable to be affected by the reflagging of the Rosella were jeopardised or under serious threat.

84 If, following that examination, the national court came to the conclusion that, in the case before it, the jobs or conditions of employment of the FSU's members liable to be adversely affected by the reflagging of the Rosella are in fact jeopardised or under serious threat, it would then have to ascertain whether the collective action initiated by FSU is suitable for ensuring the achievement of the objective pursued and does not go beyond what is necessary to attain that objective.

== Significance ==
The judgment of the European Court of Justice was met with widespread condemnation by labour law experts on the basis that it failed to give due regard for the respect of human rights and places business freedom above the interests of working people. It was one of the triggers for the UK's 2009 Lindsey Oil Refinery strikes. The ILO's Committee of Experts found severe breaches of the ILO Convention 87 on the freedom of association and protection of the right to organise. Thus it is generally viewed as being characterised by poor quality reasoning and is regarded by most commentaries as wrong.

== See also ==
- Secondary action
- Regulatory competition
- UK labour law
- US labour law

=== EU legislation and case law ===
- Posted Workers Directive
- Laval un Partneri Ltd v Svenska Byggnadsarbetareförbundet [2008] IRLR 160 C-341/05, on free movement of services

=== ECHR cases ===
- Associated Society of Locomotive Engineers and Firemen v United Kingdom [2007] IRLR 361
- Wilson v United Kingdom (2002) 35 EHRR 20
- Demir and Baykara v Turkey (2009) 48 EHRR 54
