= Posted Workers Directive 1996 =

The Posted Workers Directive 96/71/EC is an EU directive concerned with the free movement of workers within the European Union. It makes an exception to the Convention on the Law Applicable to Contractual Obligations 1980, which ordinarily requires that workers are protected by the law of the member state in which they work.

After a controversial set of decisions by the European Court of Justice, the Directive has come under criticism for reducing rights of posted workers and undermining the rights of workers in a home nation.

== Overview ==
The Directive aims to clarify competing claims of competence in the case of staff being sent abroad by their employer for a project (posting), between the rules governing labour relations in the country of origin of the employing service provider and the country where the work is actually carried out (but where the staff is not normally based). If the laws of the country where the work is actually being carried out applied even for short stays, a company wishing to offer its services in the whole of the EU would have to be aware of 27 different sets of rules. This would be a burden in particular for SMEs which would discourage them from taking advantage of the EU's Internal Market. To counter this phenomenon, the European Court of Justice has developed a balancing mechanism on the basis of the Treaty that determines which country's rules apply in a given situation. However, this case-by-case approach generates legal uncertainty which is tackled by this Directive.

To protect workers from one EU country who are sent by their employer to carry out work in another temporarily, the Directive provides that a 'hard core' of rules of the host country (country of destination) needs to be observed. The Directive was first adopted in 1996.

The directive applies where,

- a company agrees to provide a service to a client in another Member State and needs to send staff there in order to carry out this work
- a worker is posted to another country through arrangements within a group of companies, with the parent and subsidiaries based in different member states
- a worker is posted through an agreement between an employer and an employment agency

The member state hosting a posted worker must ensure he is protected by the minimum standards in article 3(1). These are,

- working time (hours, holidays, pay)
- standards applicable to agency workers
- health and safety
- pregnancy and maternity protection
- discrimination law
- in the building and construction trades, collective agreement standards that 'have been declared universally applicable' across a geographical area

However, these limited set of rights must also been read within the context of TFEU art 56 (ex TEC art 49) on the freedom of establishment, and also the right to freedom of association under the European Convention on Human Rights article 11 and the EU Race Equality Directive. In this context there is the abovementioned mechanism of 'justified restrictions for the protection of essential requirements in the general interest', that the Court of Justice of the European Union has developed on the basis of the Treaty. Where the Directive does not apply, this mechanism remains decisive.

=== Case law ===
In 2007, the European Court of Justice chose to give two decisions, whose effect appeared to suggest that employers are only required to pay their workers the rate they would receive in their home country, provided this matches minimum wages and working conditions in the country they are posted to.

- Laval Un Partneri Ltd v Svenska Byggnadsarbetareforbundet [2008] IRLR 160 (C-319/05, see also (C-319/06), on free movement of services
- ITWF v Viking Line ABP [2008] IRLR 143 (C-438/05), on freedom of establishment

== 2009 Lindsey Oil Refinery strikes ==
The Directive came to prominence during the 2009 Lindsey Oil Refinery strikes after British workers at the Lindsey Oil Refinery in North Killingholme, North Lincolnshire claimed that they were being undercut by skilled foreign labour when the Italian construction contractor IREM appointed several hundred European (mainly Italian and Portuguese) contractors on the site at a time of high unemployment in the local and global economy. However, this question is not handled by the Directive. It is a question of the right to free movement for services itself, which is handled directly by the Treaty itself, since the contractor wished to use its own staff rather than hiring external subcontractors.

Professor Michelle Everson of Birkbeck, University of London, writing in the Guardian noted at the time, a possible conflict between Article 56 TFEU and Article 45 TFEU in light of decisions of the European Court of Justice. The decisions in question, ruling in relation to the Posting of Workers Directive meant that service providers only have to adhere to the essentials such as minimum pay and health & safety under Article 56, whereas established organisations are required, under Article 45 TFEU, to comply with other matters, such as collective bargaining agreements.

== See also ==
- UK labour law
- European labour law
- EU law
- Directive on services in the internal market
- Four Freedoms (European Union)
