= Race to the top =

Race to the top may refer to:

- Race to the top (phrase), contrary to race to the bottom, one of the two effects of regulatory competition
- Race to the Top, a former US government program
