= Jay Lee (politician) =

British National Party member

Jay Lee was a British National Party (BNP) member, who fought a legal battle after being expelled from a trade union.

== Legal dispute with ASLEF ==
Lee, a driver for Virgin CrossCountry, stood as a BNP candidate in the 2002 local elections in Bexley and was subsequently expelled from the train drivers' union ASLEF for BNP membership. In May 2003, an Employment Tribunal ruled that Lee had been wrongly expelled from the union, finding ASLEF had breached section 174 of the Trade Union and Labour Relations (Consolidation) Act.

On 24 January 2004, the decision was overturned by an Employment Appeal Tribunal, which referred the case back to a new tribunal. On 7 October 2004, the new tribunal ruled in Lee's favour, awarding him at least £5,000. Lee also sued for libel after he was described as a racist, seeking aggravated damages from two senior trade unionists and two journalists. In January 2006, ASLEF paid £30,000 in an out-of-court settlement to cover Lee's legal costs in the libel case, but Lee did not receive any personal damages.

ASLEF subsequently took the UK Government to the European Court of Human Rights, claiming that UK law was in breach of Article 11 (freedom of assembly and association) of the European Convention on Human Rights. On 27 February 2007, the Court unanimously upheld ASLEF's claim that there had been a violation of the Convention and that ASLEF was entitled to expel Lee from the union.

Lee was represented at the Employment Tribunal by Lee Barnes (the BNP "legal officer") and in the libel case by Adrian Davies.

Lee left the BNP in 2010 due to disagreements with the Nick Griffin leadership. He had been a member for 18 years in total.

== Elections contested ==
UK Parliament

Date of election	Constituency	Party	Votes	%
2005 general election	Bexleyheath and Crayford	BNP	1241	2.91

European Parliament elections

Year	Region	Party	Votes	%	Result	Notes
1999	Yorkshire and the Humber	BNP	8,911	1.2	Not elected	Multi-member constituency; party list
2004	London	BNP	76,152	4.0	Not-elected	Multi-member constituency; party list

== See also ==
- ASLEF v United Kingdom
