= Labour standards in the World Trade Organization =

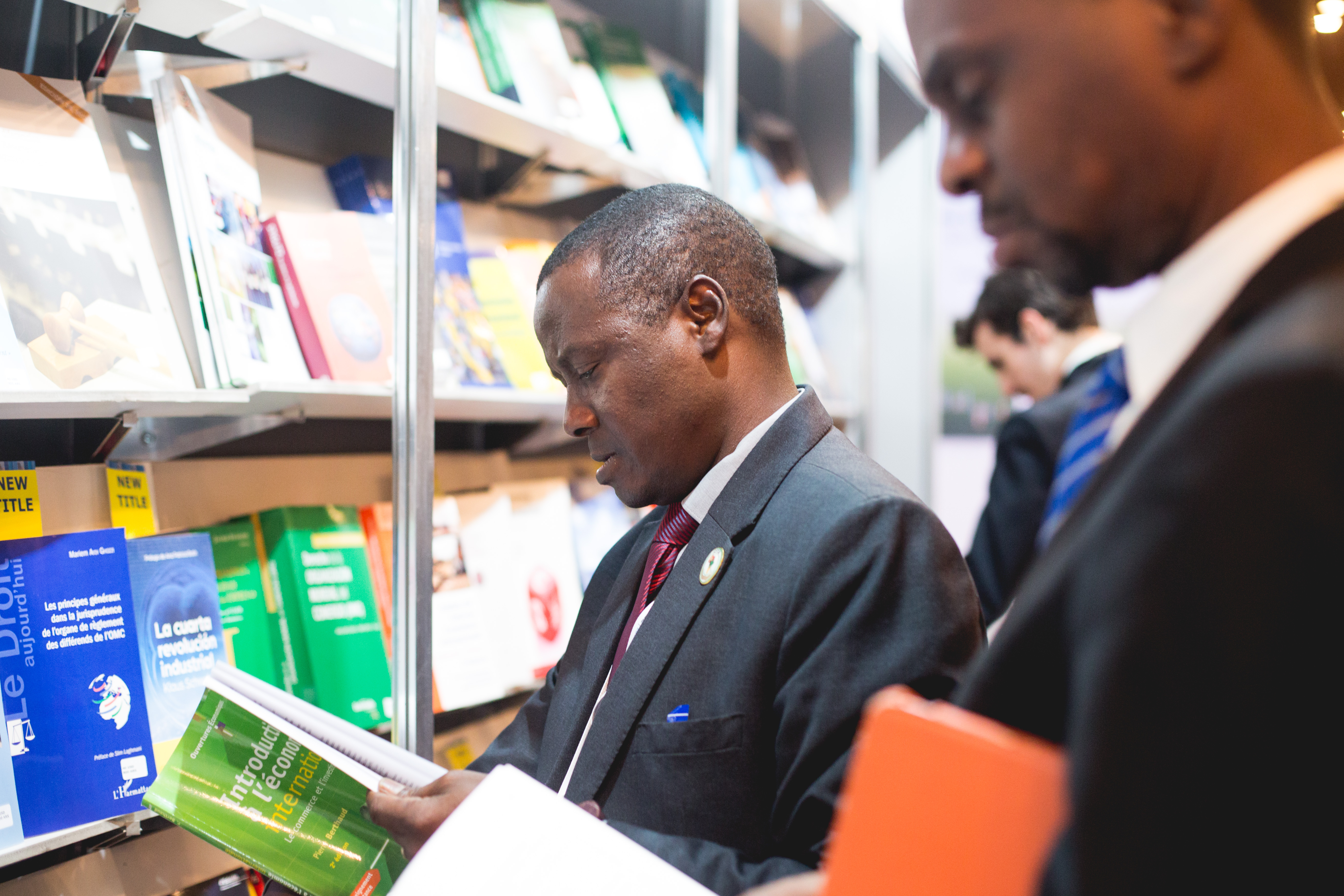
Standards related to labour are found throughout many documents of the WTO.

Labour standards in the World Trade Organization are binding rules, which form a part of the jurisprudence and principles applied within the rule making institutions of the World Trade Organization (WTO). Labour standards play an implicit, but not an overt role within the WTO, however it forms a prominent issue facing the WTO today, and has generated a wealth of academic debate.

The debate about the extent to which the WTO should recognise labour standards is typically based on the principles found in Conventions of the International Labour Organization (ILO), as well as mainstream human rights treaties, most prominently, the International Bill of Human Rights.

== WTO overview ==
The WTO is an international institution that deals with the rules of trade between countries with the view of inter alia "raising standards of living, [and] ensuring full employment…". This is achieved through a series of trade liberalising agreements based on consensus from the WTO's 164 members who form the General Council. The General Council, sitting as the Dispute Settlement Body (DSB) has the jurisdictional power to solve disputes brought before it, and is able to approve trade restrictive measures to enforce compliance with agreements. The WTO's dispute settlement process is compulsory and the DSB's recommendations and rulings immediately become binding international law.

=== History of the WTO ===
The WTO has its origins in the 1944 Bretton Woods Conference which was convened by the Allied nations towards the end of World War II with the aim of establishing an international economic order. Although the International Monetary Fund (IMF) and the International Bank for Reconstruction and Development (now known as the World Bank) were created, the International Trade Organisation (ITO), the forerunner of the WTO, was only a proposition at this point. It was not until 1947 that negotiations were concluded and the ITO came into being. In the Havana Charter, the text of the ITO, Article 7 pertained specifically to fair labour standards, requiring that members of the organisation must, amongst other things, "take fully into account the rights of workers under inter-governmental declarations, conventions and agreements" and recognise "that all countries have a common interest in the achievement and maintenance of fair labour standards related to productivity, and thus in the improvement of wages and working conditions as productivity may permit". In the interim period before the ratification of the charter, states decided to follow an interim agreement, known as the General Agreement on Tariffs and Trade (GATT), which was to be later incorporated into the ITO's legal framework. This temporary arrangement did not include any references to labour rights. The requisite number of states failed to ratify the ITO and so it failed and GATT became the basis for the current world trade system.

The WTO was established 1 January 1995 as a result of the Uruguay Round of negotiations (1986–1994). It was formed from the GATT, which became one of the core agreements annexed to the Marrakesh Agreement, the document establishing the WTO. None of the other WTO agreements concluded at the end of the Uruguay Round include labour rights obligations. The effects of GATT are still felt and some commentators have described the WTO as the one major international governance organisation that does not examine the impact of its policies upon the ability of member states to advance human rights.

== Problems with the current approach ==
The WTO currently does not have jurisdiction over labour standards and the only place in which they are mentioned in the entire set of WTO Agreements is in GATT Article XX e) "relating to the products of prison labour". Since the formation of the WTO in 1995 there have been increasing calls for action on the labour standards issue, and requests for a "human face on the world economy". The United Nations is among those bodies which have criticised the current system, and have called for a shift to a human rights oriented approach to trade, with steps to be taken "to ensure that human rights principles and obligations are fully integrated in future negotiations in the World Trade Organization", as the "primacy of human rights law over all other regimes of international law is a basic and fundamental principle that should not be departed from". It is clear that states have both a legal and a moral obligation to uphold human rights standards, inclusive of their activities in the economic sphere. The United Nations (UN) Charter states that in "the event of a conflict between the obligations of the Members of the United Nations under the present Charter and their obligations under any other international agreement, their obligations under the present Charter shall prevail".'Charter of the United Nations', Chapter XVI, Article 103 of Charter. The UN Charter explicitly advocates the upholding of human rights and fundamental freedoms.'Charter of the United Nations', preamble, art. 62(2). This means that respect for human rights, and within this, labour standards, effectively trumps any conflicting WTO Agreements. However, not all WTO members are members of the UN (e.g. Taiwan), which raises issues.

== Core labour standards ==
Identified by the International Labour Organization (ILO) in the 'Declaration of the Fundamental Principles and Rights at Work', core labour standards are "widely recognised to be of particular importance". They are universally applicable, regardless of whether the relevant conventions have been ratified, the level of development of a country or cultural values. These standards are composed of qualitative, not quantitative standards and don't establish a particular level of working conditions, wages or health and safety standards. They are not intended to undermine the comparative advantage that developing countries may hold. Core labour standards are important human rights and are recognised in widely ratified human rights instruments including the Convention on the Rights of the Child (CROC), the most widely ratified human rights treaty with 193 parties, and the ICCPR with 160 parties. The core labour standards are:

- freedom of association: workers are able to join trade unions that are independent of government and employer influence
- the right to collective bargaining: workers may negotiate with employers collectively, as opposed to individually
- the prohibition of all forms of forced labour: includes security from prison labour and slavery, and prevents workers from being forced to work under duress
- elimination of the worst forms of child labour: implementing a minimum working age and certain working condition requirements for children
- non-discrimination in employment : equal pay for equal work.

Most ILO member countries have ratified all of these conventions - 140 ILO member States have ratified all 8 fundamental Conventions.

== Barriers to promoting labour standards ==
There are some major roadblocks to the process of recognising core labour standards within the WTO. Firstly, incorporating labour rights into the WTO is not simply a question of law and economics, but also of politics and ethics. Interplay between states and interest groups cloud the already complex issue further. Recognising human rights and specifically core labour standards in the WTO raises a series of thorny political, and in some cases moral, questions. Because each state is acting primarily according to its national interest, even technically viable solutions that could benefit the majority may become politicised. The highly democratic nature of the WTO compounds this problem because consensus needs to be reached before any major decisions are made, meaning each country effectively carries the power of veto, sometimes making it difficult to achieve real progress.

Secondly, this issue occurs at the intersection between trade and human rights which raises a series of unique questions. Although the trade and human rights regimes developed alongside each other following WWII, in some ways they are very different. This is because human rights law, unlike other types of international law that are more contractual in nature, governs how states treat their own citizens. Since the Treaty of Westphalia in 1648, sovereignty has been a key principle of the international system, with states being free from any higher legal authority with the entitlement to exclusive, unqualified, and supreme rule within a delimited territory. The atrocities committed by the Nazi regime in WWII however resulted in the establishment of a human rights regime where states have a responsibility to protect the rights of their citizens, and may be subject to international condemnation and even intervention if they fail to do so. Human rights law results in an unprecedented number of controls on domestic behaviour, "challenging the traditional legal concept of state sovereignty".

Trade liberalisation on the other hand places constraints on domestic policy making ability, and the ability of states to fulfil their treaty obligations. For example, it is trade liberalisation that has led developing countries to deregulate in order to attract investment and retain a competitive advantage. The governments are therefore restricted in providing key workplace rights and satisfying core labour standards. This is known as the 'race to the bottom'. In simple terms, it is a phenomenon where interstate competition results in the progressive dismantling of regulatory standards, and in this case, those governing labour standards. In order to gain a comparative advantage and attract foreign investment, countries deregulate which leads to a decrease in working conditions and wages. The race to the bottom becomes a vicious circle with states competing to deregulate even further resulting in major human rights problems.

Many developing countries express their concern that labour standards will have a deleterious effect on their economy. The comparative wage advantage is an essential part of the world economic order so there is a general opposition to the incorporation of labour standards within the WTO. Developing countries also hold legitimate fears that the attempts to incorporate labour standards may be used as a thinly veiled protectionist measure. Tariffs can have a devastating effect on a developing economy. Although the threat of protectionism is valid and justified, in some cases it is just trade language being used to justify heinous human rights abuses such as slave labour and exploitive forms of child labour. The recognition of labour standards in the WTO may "alienate Members who negotiated the agreement with different expectations" and cause further unrest. However a country is unlikely to leave the WTO altogether as the disadvantages of leaving the system would be too great.

== Mechanisms to incorporate core labour standards into the WTO ==
Taking these tensions into account, there are some possible ways to incorporate core labour standards into the WTO.

=== Using the General Agreement on Tariffs and Trade ===
In theory, it is possible to use existing measures within the WTO to protect certain human rights. Within the WTO Agreements there are general exceptions (GATT Article XX) that can be used for the protection of specific human rights. GATT Article XX paragraphs (a), (b) and (d) can be used to impose unilateral trade restrictive measures on countries for unacceptable labour standards. However, the wording of the exceptions has resulted in extreme difficulty for those who try to invoke trade measures, as is evidenced by 48 years of GATT where no country restricted trade through these sections. One of the reasons for this is that even when trade restrictive measures are successfully applied to a state, GATT Article 1, the principle of most favoured nation treatment, comes into play. This prescribes in essence, that any country which treats a state in a particular way then has to grant the same treatment to all other states. In regards to sanctions this means that if trade sanctions are applied to one country for a certain human rights abuse, they must then be applied to all countries who abuse the same right. This can have massive economic and political ramifications.

The political aspect of GATT Article XX aside, there are technical legal problems involved with invoking the clause in the first place. The wording in the relevant sections of GATT Article XX means that it must be proved that it is "necessary" to restrict a product in order to protect human, animal or plant life or health. For a state to legally take unilateral trade restrictive measures under these sections, the 'necessity test' must first be passed. There are three components. Firstly, it must be determined whether the interests protected are vital. Secondly, there is an assessment as to whether or not alternative measures are reasonably available and thirdly it is determined whether these alternate measures are less inconsistent with GATT (are the measures being proposed 'necessary' to combat the risk?). This means that a link must be established between both the targeted risk, the product being targeted and the trade measures being undertaken, with the burden of proof is solely upon the party seeking to uphold the clause. According to Black's Law dictionary, 'necessary' does not have to carry the meaning 'indispensable' but can refer to the most appropriate or convenient option. In the Korea- Beef case it was taken to mean 'nearly indispensable', and this definition has become a benchmark by which other cases are evaluated. Context is very important, and the greater the risk posed by a product the more lenience is granted when proving a link. For example, if there is a danger to human life, the evaluation is less stringent. However it is still extremely difficult to justify cases of labour standards abuse under GATT XX. Even if the necessity test is satisfied, the chapeau to Article XX must also be satisfied- the laws must not be applied in a manner so as to constitute arbitrary or unjustifiable discrimination, nor be a disguised restriction on international trade. This last requirement is particularly important because there is often a suspicion that the insertion of labour standards into free trade agreements/other measures, for example, are really disguised restrictions on trade.

Furthermore, the 'necessity test' ensures that only when the products themselves present a threat can they be restricted. Therefore, protecting labour rights through GATT Article XX is impossible, even if the production of the product may threaten human life. For example, the worst forms of child labour are a heinous practice which fall within the Article XX exception (b) yet children cannot be protected under this because it is their work conditions which are harmful, not the products themselves. In order to assist in removing constraints on states' ability to protect labour rights through GATT Article XX, the word 'necessary' should be replaced in Article XX(b) with 'relating to', as is used in GATT XX (c) and (g), or 'involving' as is the wording in (i). In the Korea- Beef case this was decided to be "more flexible textually", not requiring such stringent linkage. This would allow trade measures to be implemented to combat labour standards with more ease, whilst ensuring that the exceptions are not used indiscriminately. However, due to the political concerns expressed above it would be quite difficult to amend the GATT, especially Article XX.

=== Incorporation of a social clause ===
A solution that is widely talked about by some trade unionists and human rights groups is the incorporation of a social clause into the WTO Agreement. Essentially, this means that the core labour standards would inserted into an article within the WTO Agreements which could be a more viable option than amendment of the Agreements themselves. If a state violated the social clause, the breach could become subject to WTO scrutiny, through the usual WTO dispute settlement provisions (provided provision is made for this when inserting a social clause). As a result of dispute settlement proceedings, the DSB could, at the request of the complaining party, recommend that retaliatory trade measures be taken against the offending country. At first glance this might seem to be a good solution, as labour rights could not only be recognised, but enforced within the dispute settlement mechanisms of the WTO.

=== Problems with unilateral trade sanctions as an enforcement mechanism ===
Within the international system it is difficult to enforce international law, particularly with regard to human rights. So using trade sanctions as a coercive measure is an appealing prospect to ensure cooperation. However, there are many reasons why trade sanctions are an inappropriate mechanism for enforcing labour standards. They are generally against WTO principles, and can only be used in very limited circumstances that are authorized by the WTO agreements, such as anti-dumping and countervailing measures. Politically, it is unlikely that unilateral action would be allowed for breaches of labour standards. Even assuming that labour standards are able to be enforced through trade measures within the WTO, either through amendments to GATT XX, the introduction of a social clause or any other measure, they do not provide a solution to the complexity of the labour standards issue and should not be used to deal with disputes over labour standards.

Firstly, trade measures have the effect of constraining access to markets, which is why they are effective as a deterrent. However this may be counterproductive, resulting in developing countries becoming even poorer without helping the workers. "Trade sanctions are a blunt instrument, penalizing the country as a whole, not just those responsible for rights violations." The linkage and inalienability between civil & political, and economic, social & cultural rights means that without a strong economic foundation, not only ICESCR rights are jeopardised, but ICCPR rights also. For example, in ensuring that civil and political rights such as the prohibition of forced labour are protected, there must be sufficient funds available to legislate against this practice, and monitor and ensure that the legislation is carried out. Therefore, when a country is denied access to global markets, the resulting poverty can mean that the capability of the country to protect human rights is diminished, even if the political will is present. Not only may the government be affected, but individual businesses and workers may experience increased hardship as a result of trade barriers. For example, wages may be lowered to retain a competitive edge, which is the direct opposite of the intended effect of the sanctions.

Secondly, social clauses and the resulting sanctions are only applicable to export sectors. This causes considerable problems. For example, if sanctions were applied to the export sector because of the use of child labour, affected children would simply move into employment opportunities in the non-export sector (assuming full labour moveability). Working in the unregulated and non-accountable 'shadow economy' can lead to even worse conditions and human rights abuses. Studies show that child labour in the export sector is only 5% of overall child labour. Therefore, sanctions may not improve the situation at all and may force children into even worse working conditions. Because sanctions only apply to exported goods, abuse of core labour standards can occur domestically with few legal repercussions. One of the core conventions, that condemning forced labour, is blatantly violated in the US where prison inmates make commercial products. However, because they are supplied solely to the domestic market, the WTO does not have jurisdiction and trade sanctions cannot be applied.

Thirdly, poor labour standards are usually rooted in poverty and this is not something that sanctions can solve. If the root cause of the problem is not addressed and the a worker loses their job because of a heavy handed approach such as trade measures resulting in mass lay-offs, the family may lose its income and be plunged into greater poverty.

Furthermore, sanctions have the potential be used in an unfair way or for protectionist purposes. One reason for this is because when the DSB rules that trade sanctions are allowed in response to a violation of one of the agreements, it is up to the wronged country to choose what products it will restrict. This has seen the US restrict a variety of imports from the EU including telecommunications products and cheese, after winning a case in the WTO over bananas. This is different from GATT XX in that the targeted product does not have to be directly related to the perceived threat. The problem with the indiscriminate restrictions of products is that it gives the complainant a huge amount of power which could lead to protectionism. Trade penalties can have a much larger effect on developing countries than developed. Although legally they have the same power as other nations, developing countries are at a disadvantage when it comes to pursuing trade measures because unilateral trade measures often have deleterious consequences for the punishing country as well as the offender. In addition, hostile regimes can gain control of the black market and charge exorbitant prices. Trade sanctions are not necessarily an effective way to deal with "wayward" governments as it simply gives them greater control of the countries resources.

=== Furtherance of the WTO and ILO relationship ===
Although not a suitable long term solution, a way to break the current deadlock would be to further institutionalise the relationship between the WTO and ILO. The WTO Secretariat has some restricted interaction with the ILO "compiling statistics, research and technical assistance and training". Originally however, the ITO was supposed to have a strong working relationship with the ILO and "consult and co-operate" in all labour related matters, as well as cooperating in regards economic development and reconstruction. The current system is but a shadow of this, with very limited collaboration. When the issue of labour standards was raised at the 1996 Singapore Ministerial conference, Article 4 of the resultant Ministerial Declaration ruled that "the WTO and ILO Secretariats will continue their existing collaboration". The Chairman of the Singapore Ministerial Conference Yeo Chow Tong later clarified in his concluding remarks that this collaboration "respects fully the respective and separate mandates of the two organisations". During the Geneva Ministerial Conference, the US, EU and South Africa pushed again for a more substantive relationship between the two organisations which was opposed by a group of developing countries, led by Brazil. But despite the amount of controversy and discussion about the issue, the Ministerial Declaration failed to make a mention of it.

The obvious reluctance of the WTO to deal with labour standards and the unlikelihood of recognition in this field in the near future means that the link between the WTO and ILO is crucial in regulating labour standards. However this relationship has never been formalised within the WTO and so will remain ineffective at best without proactive change. Within the Agreement Establishing the WTO, Article III 'Functions of the WTO' Par. 5 of reads: "With a view to achieving greater coherence in global economic policy-making, the WTO shall cooperate, as appropriate, with the International Monetary Fund and with the International Bank for Reconstruction and Development and its affiliated agencies." The ILO should be inserted into this section. Furthermore, in order to establish a formal, more meaningful relationship, a Ministerial Declaration should be written acknowledging the high level of cooperation and interconnectedness of the organisations, similar to the Ministerial Declarations regarding the relationship with the IMF and World Bank. The advantage of this relationship is that the ILO would not be undermined by the WTO, maintaining its authority in regards to labour standards. The mandates of each organisation would be respected, and there would be no recourse to trade sanctions whilst maintaining a degree of basic protection for labour rights. Collaboration between the ILO and WTO should also make use of the joint research facilities available, and a series of reports on labour rights should be created, similar to the ILO and WTO report "Joint Study on Trade and Employment", but with a focus on labour standards. In the thinking of ILO Director General Michel Hansenne in the aftermath of the Singapore Ministerial Conference, a good working relationship could be established by pressuring states to ratify the relevant ILO conventions comprising the core labour standards. A scheme was established where those states who do not choose to ratify have to present a brief every 4 years "showing the extent to which effect has been given, or is proposed to be given, to any of the provisions of the Convention by legislation, administrative action, collective agreement or otherwise and stating the difficulties which prevent or delay the ratification of such Convention". Although the ILO is unable to enforce labour standards and can simply make recommendations, relying on moral suasion, Hansenne's scheme once improved could lead to increased transparency and lead to regular discussion about labour standards, which is obviously to be desired. More regular reports, and increased pressure on non-ratifying state are necessary. Following the Singapore Ministerial Conference Hansenne further opined that it would be beneficial if a complaints committee were set up which could recommend that (a) A case does not require further consideration (b) The offending government rectify the labour standards abuse (c) The matter be referred to the Fact-finding and Conciliation Commission of the ILO with the agreement of the offending government. Unfortunately, the committee idea failed to gain support.

It has been suggested that another way in which to increase the importance of the relationship between the WTO and ILO is that countries wishing to join the organisation must first ratify the relevant ILO convention. Within the WTO, existing members set the standards of accession. However this use of double standards is completely unjust, and does nothing to address the labour standard abuses of existing members. This is still no way of coercing uncooperative states into respecting core standards, and not including labour standards expressly within the WTO has the possible result of sidelining the issue and so is no means an ideal solution, but remains a worthy first step.

=== Increased civil society participation ===
One suggestion for the improvement of the WTO system is to allow for increased civil society participation. This would result in the centralisation of social issues, and within this, core labour standards. Furthermore, civil society groups are in an ideal position to put pressure on governments to uphold their human rights commitments, and monitor any progress in this field. Within civil society, Non-Government Organisations (NGOs) would play a particularly crucial role. The term NGO passed into popular usage in the early 1970s and has come to mean a non-profit organisation that has specific objectives that is independent from the government, non-criminal, non-violent, not a political party. Within the UN under Article 71 there are 2,350 (2004) NGOs with consultative status. This successful system has set a precedent for formalised NGO participation and should be used as a model for the WTO. There is provision for NGO participation within the WTO already under Article 5:2 'Relations with Other Organisations of the Marrakech Agreement': "The General Council may make appropriate arrangements for consultation and cooperation with non-governmental organizations concerned with matters related to those of the WTO". The WTO is a strictly intergovernmental organisation, which means that civil society has no direct input, and much decision-making takes place behind closed doors. This system is appropriate when dealing with tariff reduction issues, but as large scale protests outside WTO meetings continue to demonstrate, social issues which concern civil society at large are forming a part of the WTO agenda. Globalisation means that decisions made at the WTO have come to affect everyone's lives, and hence there has been an increase in interest in the goings-on of the WTO by civil society. Allowing NGOs to have a say could increase transparency of the system, put pressure on non-compliant governments and provide specialist knowledge and support. Many organisations such as Oxfam, the International Confederation of Trade Unions and One World have already investigated the link between trade and labour standards- it does not make sense to ignore their expertise in this field. Unlike many domestic judicial systems, the WTO does not allow public scrutiny of proceedings, and it is this, rather than lack of any textual mechanism, that impedes NGO involvement. Forums are an effective way to allow NGOs to express their opinion and present information and regular forums should be held to discuss current, relevant issues. This idea has certainly won some support. In the aftermath of the Geneva Ministerial Conference in 1998, US President Bill Clinton said that "The WTO was created to lift the lives of ordinary citizens', it should listen to them. I propose the WTO, for the first time, provide a forum where business, labour, environmental and consumer groups can speak out and help guide further evolution of the WTO. When this body convenes again, I believe that the world's trade ministers should sit down with representatives of the broad public to begin this discussion". It is not only NGOs who should have increased participation, but expert UN human rights bodies who are also highly proficient in exploring the trade and human rights intersection. For example, the UN Sub-Commission on the Promotion and Protection of Human Rights has regrettably not been included in WTO processes.

=== Recognition within the WTO preamble ===
One of the first steps to enforcing core labour standards is to acknowledge them explicitly within the WTO. Specific amendments to the body of the agreements on how to include labour standards within the WTO will take time as there are myriad proposed ways in which to do this. Therefore, incorporating the importance of labour standards into the preamble of the Agreement Establishing the WTO is an important action- with both symbolic and legal value. Although this does not place any binding obligations upon states to take immediate action on the labour standards issue, it can be used for the purposes of interpretation according to the Vienna Convention on the Law of Treaties: "The context for the purpose of the interpretation of a treaty shall comprise, in addition to the text... its preamble and annexes". There are oblique references to human rights already within the WTO preamble, but more explicit recognition is desirable. The importance of the preamble has been recognised by the Appellate Body report in many cases so if labour rights were inserted into the preamble, the DSB when interpreting the agreements would be forced to take the preamble into account, and decisions with more favourable conclusions for labour rights would hopefully be passed down. So although this measure seems ineffective, once consensus has been established to include labour standards, this is one of the first steps that should be taken.

Incorporation of core labour standards into the preamble would also lead to the examination of human rights abuses through existing WTO review mechanisms. In 1988 the decision was made to make regular reviews of state's trade policy conducted by the WTO, a key part of the transparency of the organisation. Governments submit information to the WTO Secretariat who issue a report which is then examined by the General Council sitting as the Trade Policy Review Body. Government policies are reviewed in relation to the "functioning of the multilateral trading system" so as to encourage adherence to commitments under the agreements, and greater transparency. At present, the reviews are focusing solely upon the issue of trade liberalisation, and whether a member's policies support this. Although free trade is an important issue, it is not the overall objective of the multilateral trading system and should not be examined to the exclusion of all else. The real objectives of the WTO, with the aim of "raising standards of living, [and] ensuring full employment…" are conspicuously ignored. If labour rights were incorporated into the Marrakech Agreement Preamble, it would be even easier to address labour standards through the trade policy review mechanism.

One of the problems with the system is that the member state has the responsibility to supply the information to the WTO Secretariat. With no one checking on them, this could lead to problems however NGOs could play an important role in overcoming this. A second issue is that the regularity of reviews is calculated by a state's share of world trade. This means that the top 4 countries (the "Quad"): US, EU, Japan and Canada must review their policy every 2 years. The next 16 countries must submit reviews every four years and developing countries every 6 years. Although the system may work currently, when it comes to human rights this is a problem. This is because the labour standards and human rights abuses of developing countries are no less egregious than those in developed countries and so do not deserve to be monitored any less. Each state should have to submit a report addressing the "real" objectives of the WTO every 2 years or so, as well as a report addressing trade liberalisation according to the current system. By reporting on labour standards, the issue is opened to discussion, which can only be positive. Although states are not forced to act on any labour standards abuses that may be found within their territories, the public acknowledgement of their existence could provide fuel for human rights groups and victims. The very act of raising the labour standards issue is the first step because the power of shame should never be underestimated.

== See also ==
- UK labour law
- European labour law
- World Trade Organization
