= 2009 Lindsey Oil Refinery strikes =

Labour dispute in the United Kingdom

The 2009 Lindsey Oil Refinery strikes were a series of wildcat strikes that affected the energy industry in the United Kingdom in 2009. The action involved workers at around a dozen energy sites across the UK who walked out in support of other British workers at the Total's Lindsey Oil Refinery. The Lindsey Oil Refinery construction workers went on strike because employment was not offered to them on a £200 million construction contract to build a hydro desulphurisation unit at the site.

== January 2009 action ==
On 28 January 2009, approximately 800 of Lindsey Oil Refinery's local contractors went on strike following the appointment by the Italian construction contractor IREM of several hundred European (mainly Italian and Portuguese) contractors on the site at a time of high unemployment in the local and global economy. The action attracted considerable media interest.

Workers contended that the strike was in defence of a national agreement determining wages and conditions in the industry.

The protests were largely portrayed in the British media as being solely about the use of the European Union's Posted Workers Directive to discriminate against British workers, prompting Unite the Union to make a statement on 4 February to refute xenophobic comments in the media. Since European Union law enshrines the right to the freedom of movement for workers between EU member states, British Prime Minister Gordon Brown said: "When I talked about British jobs, I was talking about giving people in Britain the skills, so that they have the ability to get jobs which were at present going to people from abroad, and actually encouraging people to take up the courses and the education and learning that is necessary for British workers to be far more skilled for the future." Asked for his message to people considering the wildcat strikes, he said: "That that's not the right thing to do and it's not defensible." Italian and Portuguese construction workers, living on barges in nearby docks, were set to starting work there. British trade unions claimed Britons were not given any opportunity to apply for the posts.

Additional contractors at other sites in the United Kingdom also initiated action as a result of the protests. On 30 January, around 700 workers at the Grangemouth Oil Refinery in central Scotland walked out in solidarity with the North Lincolnshire strikers. They were also joined by 50 strikers in Aberthaw, in South Wales, 400 at the ICI site in Wilton, Teesside. and walkouts also took place at BP in Saltend, Hull.

Following several days of talks between representatives from Total and the GMB union which were chaired by Acas, a deal was finally struck on 5 February and workers at the refinery agreed to return to work the following Monday. The deal would see 102 new jobs being created for British workers in addition to the posts awarded to an IREM. An earlier deal that would have seen the creation of 60 British jobs (40 skilled and 20 unskilled) had been rejected. On 16 February an Acas report concluded that Total had not broken the law in employing Italian workers at the refinery.

The strike at Lindsey resumed on 11 June 2009, after a subcontractor at the site laid off a number of employees, later confirmed to be 51. The strike was quickly followed by sympathy strikes at Cheshire's Fiddlers Ferry Power Station on 15 June and Aberthaw on 17 June. The strikes escalated on 18 June, with walkouts at Drax Power Station and Eggborough Power Station in Yorkshire and Ratcliffe-on-Soar Power Station in Nottinghamshire, BP Saltend, and the BOC oxygen plant at Scunthorpe.

== June 2009 action ==
On 19 June 2009 nearly 700 construction staff were sacked at the Lindsey Oil Refinery. The sackings came following 1,200 workers walking out unofficially at the plant in a jobs dispute. The following plants walked out in sympathy:

- Stanlow oil refinery, Ellesmere Port, Cheshire
- Aberthaw, Cardiff
- Ferrybridge power station, West Yorkshire
- Staythorpe Power Station, Nottinghamshire
- Ensus site, Wilton chemical complex, Teesside
- Drax and Eggborough power stations, near Selby, North Yorkshire
- Fiddler's Ferry power station in Cheshire

Paul Kenny, General Secretary of the GMB trade union, said: "GMB condemn the action of Total. Total have for a full week refused to meet the union to resolve the problems through ACAS. It seems pretty obvious that there is a mass case of victimisation taking place here. Locking out the workforce at Lindsay will not solve the problem. It will escalate it."

Workers at the Lindsey refinery were invited to re-apply for their jobs, with managers at Total giving them a deadline of 17:00 on Monday 22 June 2009 to do so. However, angered by the actions of the management, workers burned their dismissal letters at a protest outside the refinery. Around 3,000 workers at other sites around the country also walked out in support of the Lindsey workers.

Negotiations between Total and representatives of the GMB union were adjourned on Tuesday 23 June with some progress having been made, but sources said a number of "significant barriers" remained outstanding before the dispute could be resolved. Talks resumed on 25 June, and an agreement was reached late that evening to end the industrial action, accepted at a mass meeting outside the refinery on the following Monday. The deal included the reinstatement of the 647 workers at the Lindsey site who had been sacked for taking unofficial action, offers of alternative jobs for the 51 workers laid off, and assurances that workers at power stations and oil and gas terminals who walked out in sympathy would not be victimised. On 29 June workers at the refinery voted to accept the deal.

== See also ==
- International Transport Workers Federation v Viking Line ABP
