= Associated Society of Locomotive Engineers and Firemen v United Kingdom =

European Court of Human Rights case

ASLEF v United Kingdom
- Court: European Court of Human Rights
- Decided: 27 February 2007
- Citation: [2007] IRLR 361
- Transcript: Full text of judgment

Court membership
- Judges sitting: Josep Casadevall (Andorra - President), Nicolas Bratza (UK), Stanislav Pavlocschi (Moldova), Lech Garlicki (Poland), Ljiljana Mijoviċ (Bosnia & Herzegovina), Ján Šikuta (Slovakia), Pâivi Hirvelä (Finland).

Associated Society of Locomotive Engineers and Firemen v United Kingdom [2007] ECHR 184 was a landmark case before the European Court of Human Rights and upheld the right of ASLEF, a British trade union, to be able to choose its members.

== Facts ==
The Associated Society of Locomotive Engineers and Firemen (ASLEF) is an independent trade union representing mainly train drivers employed on the UK railways. One of ASLEF's aims is,

to assist in the furtherance of the labour movement generally towards a Socialist society [and to] promote and develop and enact positive policies in regard to equality of treatment in our industries and ASLEF regardless of sex, sexual orientation, marital status, religion, creed, colour, race or ethnic origin.

In 1978, ASLEF's governing body, the Annual Assembly of Delegates, passed a resolution to campaign against and "expose the obnoxious policies of political parties such as the National Front" (NF). In February 2002, Jay Lee, a member of the British National Party (BNP)—which had grown from the NF—joined ASLEF. In April 2002, Lee stood as a candidate for the BNP in the Bexley local elections. On 17 April 2002, an ASLEF officer sent a report on Lee to the union's General Secretary, including information that Lee was a BNP activist, had distributed anti-Islamic leaflets and that in 1998 he had been a BNP candidate in Newham. Attached was an article written by Lee for Spearhead, the BNP magazine, and a fax from the Bexley Council for Racial Equality stating that Lee had seriously harassed Anti-Nazi League pamphleteers. On 19 April 2002, the Executive Committee of ASLEF voted unanimously to expel Lee, on the grounds that his membership of the BNP was incompatible with membership of ASLEF, that he was likely to bring the union into disrepute and that he was against the objects of the union.

== Judgment ==
=== Domestic appeals ===
Jay Lee took ASLEF to the Employment Tribunal to contest his expulsion, under section 174 of the Trade Union and Labour Relations (Consolidation) Act 1992, which prohibits unions from excluding or expelling persons wholly or to any extent on the ground that the individual is or was a member of a political party. He was successful in his case.

ASLEF appealed to the Employment Appeal Tribunal which overturned the earlier decision, finding that a union could expel a member on the ground of his or her conduct, and referred the case to a second Employment Tribunal. However, the second tribunal upheld Lee's complaint, saying that his expulsion had been "primarily because of his membership of the BNP". ASLEF was therefore forced to re-admit Lee as a member, in breach of its own rules. Failure to re-admit would have meant paying compensation of at least €8,600. Even though it re-admitted Lee, ASLEF remained exposed to a claim for compensation of up to €94,200. ASLEF lodged an application with the European Court of Human Rights (ECHR, in Strasbourg) on 24 March 2005. The complaint relied on Article 11 of the European Convention of Human Rights (freedom of assembly and association), which states,

Everyone has the right to freedom of peaceful assembly and to freedom of association with others, including the right to form and to join trade unions for the protection of his interests.

ASLEF's case was that the union had been prevented from expelling a member due to his membership of the BNP, a political party which advocates views inimical to its own, and that this was an infringement of freedom of association. The nature of the argument is that the United Kingdom's law (i.e. s.174 of TULRCA 1992) which required ASLEF to take back Lee into union membership or face compensation payments, violates union members' freedom of association. So ASLEF was now suing the UK government (rather than defending a case brought by Lee).

=== European Court of Human Rights ===
Finding in ASLEF's favour, the Court held unanimously that there had been a violation of Article 11 and awarded the union €53,900 for costs and expenses.

The Court held that just as a worker should be free to join or not join a union, so is a trade union equally free to choose its members. Article 11 could not be interpreted as imposing obligations on associations to admit anyone who applied to join. Further, where associations are set up by people who share common values, ideals and goals, it would run counter to the very effectiveness of the freedom at stake if they had no control over their membership.

The Court's view was that the United Kingdom had not struck the right balance between Lee's right and the rights of ASLEF. The Court was persuaded that expulsion did not impinge in any significant way on Lee's freedom of expression or political activity, nor would he suffer any detriment: there being no "closed shop", there was no apparent prejudice to him in terms of employment or livelihood.

Of greater weight was the union's right to choose its members. Trade unions in the UK and Europe were commonly affiliated to political parties or movements, particularly those on the left. They were not "bodies solely devoted to the politically-neutral aspects of the well-being of their members, but were often ideological with strongly held views". There had been no suggestion in the Employment Tribunal hearings that ASLEF had erred in concluding that Lee's political values and ideals fundamentally clashed with its own.

The UK government argued that UK law would have allowed Lee's expulsion if ASLEF had restricted itself to a complaint solely about Lee's conduct. However, the Court noted that the Employment Tribunal found that ASLEF's objections were primarily based on his BNP membership, and the Court thought it unreasonable to expect ASLEF to use the pretext of a complaint about conduct, since this was carried out by him in the context of his membership of the BNP.

In the absence of any hardship suffered by Lee or any abusive and unreasonable conduct by ASLEF, the Court held that there had been a violation of Article 11 and found in favour of ASLEF.

== Significance ==
Brendan Barber, general secretary of the Trades Union Congress, described the European court's decision as an "important and welcome judgment", saying that it was "common sense" that unions "should not be forced to accept into membership people opposed to the basic principles of trade unionism." He added, "Every union will welcome this clear decision that they can now expel BNP members." The ASLEF General Secretary, Keith Norman, thanked the 18 unions who gave ASLEF financial assistance to allow them to go to the European courts: NUM, CYWU, PFA, UCATT, NATFHE, Napo, USDAW, EIS, RMT, Unison, PCS, NUMAST, Community, CWU, CSP, GMB, FBU and NUJ.

== See also ==
- Wilson and the National Union of Journalists v the United Kingdom [2002] IRLR 568
- Demir and Baykara v Turkey (2009) 48 EHRR 54
- UK labour law
