= Laval un Partneri Ltd v Svenska Byggnadsarbetareförbundet =

EU law case establishing the right to strike

Laval un Partneri Ltd v Svenska Byggnadsarbetareforbundet
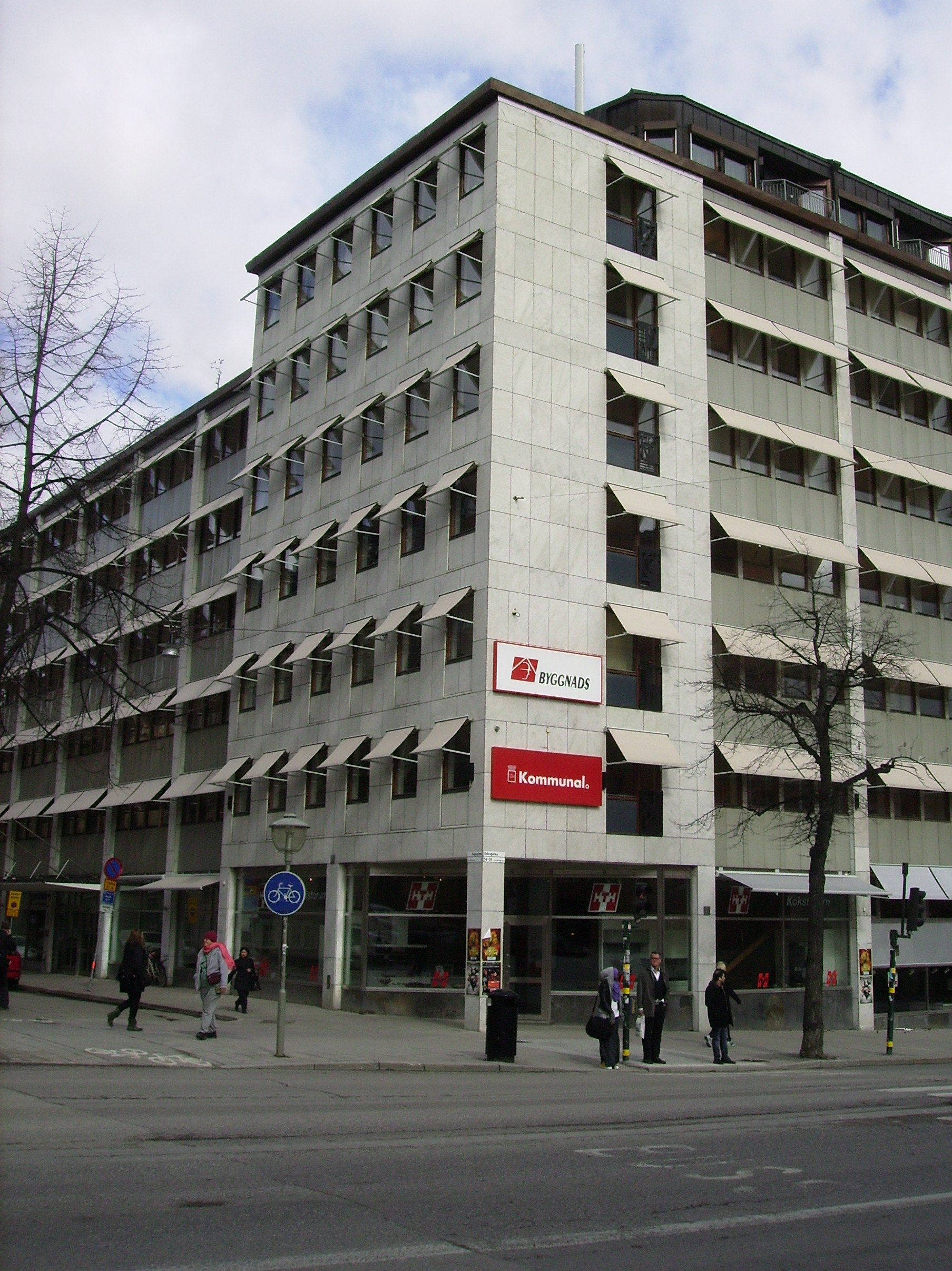
- Court: European Court of Justice
- Decided: 18 December 2007
- Citations: C-341/05; [2008] IRLR 160

Keywords
- Right to strike, freedom to provide services, Posted Workers Directive

Laval un Partneri Ltd v Svenska Byggnadsarbetareförbundet (2007) C-341/05 is an EU law case, relevant to all labour law within the European Union, which held that there is a positive right to strike. However, it also held that the right to strike must be exercised proportionately and in particular this right was subject to justification where it could infringe the right to freedom to provide services under the Treaty on the Functioning of the European Union article 56 (ex TEC article 49).

Laval was shortly preceded by another case involving the right to strike on freedom of establishment The Rosella, and by the influential European Court of Human Rights decision in Demir and Baykara v Turkey. It was soon implicitly reversed by the Rome I Regulation, recital 35, which states that in terms of conflicts of laws, mandatory rules for employees "can only be derogated from to their benefit."

== Facts ==
A Latvian company, Laval un Partneri Ltd won a contract from the Swedish government to renovate schools. Laval Ltd posted Latvian workers to Sweden to work on site. These workers earned much less than comparable Swedish workers. The Swedish Building Workers' Union (Svenska Byggnadsarbetareförbundet) asked Laval Ltd to sign its collective agreement. This collective agreement would have been more favourable than the terms required to protect posted workers under the Posted Workers Directive, and also contained a clause for setting pay that would not allow Laval Ltd to determine in advance what the pay would be. Laval Ltd refused to sign the collective agreement. The Swedish Builders Union, supported by the Electricians Union called a strike to blockade Laval Ltd's building sites. As a result, Laval Ltd could not do business in Sweden. It claimed that the blockade infringed its right to free movement of services under TEC article 49 (now TFEU article 56). The Swedish court referred the matter to the ECJ.

== Judgment ==
The ECJ held that, following ITWF v Viking Lines ABP (The Rosella), the "right to take collective action for the protection of the workers of the host state against possible social dumping may constitute an overriding reason of public interest" which could justify an infringement of free movement of services. However, in this case, it did not, because the systems for Sweden's collective bargaining were felt to be not "sufficiently precise and accessible" for the company to know its obligations in advance.

79 It is true that Article 3(7) of Directive 96/71 provides that paragraphs 1 to 6 are not to prevent application of terms and conditions of employment which are more favourable to workers. In addition, according to recital 17, the mandatory rules for minimum protection in force in the host country must not prevent the application of such terms and conditions.

80 Nevertheless, Article 3(7) of Directive 96/71 cannot be interpreted as allowing the host Member State to make the provision of services in its territory conditional on the observance of terms and conditions of employment which go beyond the mandatory rules for minimum protection. As regards the matters referred to in Article 3(1), first subparagraph, (a) to (g), Directive 96/71 expressly lays down the degree of protection for workers of undertakings established in other Member States who are posted to the territory of the host Member State which the latter State is entitled to require those undertakings to observe. Moreover, such an interpretation would amount to depriving the directive of its effectiveness.

81 Therefore – without prejudice to the right of undertakings established in other Member States to sign of their own accord a collective labour agreement in the host Member State, in particular in the context of a commitment made to their own posted staff, the terms of which might be more favourable – the level of protection which must be guaranteed to workers posted to the territory of the host Member State is limited, in principle, to that provided for in Article 3(1), first subparagraph, (a) to (g) of Directive 96/71, unless, pursuant to the law or collective agreements in the Member State of origin, those workers already enjoy more favourable terms and conditions of employment as regards the matters referred to in that provision.

[...]

110 However, collective action such as that at issue in the main proceedings cannot be justified in the light of the public interest objective referred to in paragraph 102 of the present judgment, where the negotiations on pay, which that action seeks to require an undertaking established in another Member State to enter into, form part of a national context characterised by a lack of provisions, of any kind, which are sufficiently precise and accessible that they do not render it impossible or excessively difficult in practice for such an undertaking to determine the obligations with which it is required to comply as regards minimum pay (see, to that effect, Arblade and Others, paragraph 43).

== Significance ==
The case was roundly condemned by labour and human rights lawyers throughout the European Union. After the onset of the Great Recession, in the 2009 Lindsey Oil Refinery strikes, the issue of posted workers triggered a significant amount of unrest, with police equipping themselves with riot gear in response to wildcat strikes over posted workers in the United Kingdom.

In Sweden, the Labour Court sentenced the two trade unions to pay 550,000 Swedish kronor (€65,700) in so-called general damages plus interest and legal costs to Laval’s bankruptcy estate. The International Labour Organization’s Committee of Experts every year investigates member countries’ reports on how they implement the ILO’s conventions, in this case convention 87 on the freedom of association and protection of the right to organise. In 2013 the Committee of Experts criticised the changes made in Sweden after the EU Court of Justice ruling. According to the ILO the changes constituted a severe breach of the freedom of association.

== See also ==
- The Rosella [2008] IRLR 143 (C-438/05), on freedom of establishment
- Demir and Baykara v Turkey (2009) 48 EHRR 54
- Commission v Luxembourg (2008) C-319/06
- Commission v Germany (2007) C-490/04, [2007] ECR I-6095
- Rüffert v Land Niedersachsen (2008) C-346/06, [2008] ECR I-1989
