= Irem (construction company) =

IREM S.p.A.
- Company type: Società per Azioni
- Industry: Mechanical Construction
- Founded: 1 January 1979; 47 years ago
- Founder: a group of professionals with extensive experience in the field of construction and mechanical assembly
- Headquarters: Syracuse, Italy
- Area served: Worldwide
- Key people: Giovanni Musso (CEO)
- Revenue: ▲€350 million (2017)
- Number of employees: ▲3,500 (2017)
- Website: www.iremspa.it

IREM S.p.A. is an Italian construction contracting global company. It was founded in 1979 by a group of professionals with experience in the mechanical construction business. Giovanni Musso is the Managing director of IREM S.p.A.

== 2009 Lindsay Oil Refinery protests ==
IREM's contract with Total's Lindsey Oil Refinery in England prompted actions of protest which started in late January 2009.

On 28 January 2009, approximately 800 of Lindsey Oil Refinery's local contractors went on strike following the appointment of several hundred European contractors (mainly from Italy and Portugal) on the site to build a hydro desulphurisation unit at a time of high unemployment in the local and global economy. The action attracted considerable media interest in Italy, Portugal and the United Kingdom.

Additional contractors at other sites in the United Kingdom also initiated industrial action as a result of the protests. On 30 January, around 700 workers at the Grangemouth Oil Refinery in central Scotland walked out in solidarity with the North Lincolnshire strikers. They have also been joined by 50 strikers in Aberthaw, in South Wales, and 400 at the ICI site in Wilton, Teesside.

== See also ==
- List of Italian companies
