= Regulatory competition =

Social sciences phenomenon

Regulatory competition, also called competitive governance or policy competition, is a phenomenon in law, economics and politics concerning the desire of lawmakers to compete with one another in the kinds of law offered in order to attract businesses or other actors to operate in their jurisdiction. Regulatory competition depends upon the ability of actors such as companies, workers or other kinds of people to move between two or more separate legal systems. Once this is possible, then the temptation arises for the people running those different legal systems to compete to offer better terms than their "competitors" to attract investment. Historically, regulatory competition has operated within countries having federal systems of regulation - particularly the United States, but since the mid-20th century and the intensification of economic globalisation, regulatory competition became an important issue internationally.

One opinion is that regulatory competition in fact creates a "race to the top" in standards, due to the ability of different actors to select the most efficient rules by which to be governed. The main fields of law affected by the phenomenon of regulatory competition are corporate law, labour law, tax and environmental law. Another opinion is that regulatory competition between jurisdictions creates a "race to the bottom" in standards, due to the decreased ability of any jurisdiction to enforce standards without the cost of driving investment abroad.

== History ==
The concept of regulatory competition emerged from the late 19th and early 20th century experience with charter competition among US states to attract corporations to domicile in their jurisdiction. In 1890 New Jersey enacted a liberal corporation charter, which charged low fees for company registration and lower franchise taxes than other states. Delaware attempted to copy the law to attract companies to its own state. This competition ended when Woodrow Wilson as Governor tightened New Jersey's laws again through a series of seven statutes.

In academic literature the phenomenon of regulatory competition reducing standards overall was argued for by AA Berle and GC Means in The Modern Corporation and Private Property (1932) while the concept received formal recognition by the US Supreme Court in a decision of Justice Louis Brandeis in the 1933 case Ligget Co. v. Lee In 1932 Brandeis also coined the term “laboratories of democracy” in New State Ice Company v. Liebmann, noting that the Federal government was capable of ending experiment.

== Private law ==
=== Corporate law ===
American corporate law scholars have debated on the role of the regulatory competition on corporate law for more than one decade. A Comparative Bibliography In the United States legal academia, corporate law is conventionally said to be the product of a "race" among states to attract incorporations by making their corporate laws attractive to those who choose where to incorporate. Given that it has long been possible to incorporate in one state while doing business primarily in other states, US states have rarely been able or willing to use law tied to where a firm is incorporated to regulate or constrain corporations or those who run them. However, U.S. states have long regulated corporations with other laws (e.g., environmental laws, employment laws) that are not tied to where a firm is incorporated, but are based on where a firm does business.

From the "race" to attract incorporations, Delaware has emerged as the winner, at least among publicly traded corporations. The corporate franchise tax accounts for between 15% and 20% of the state's budget.

In Europe, regulatory competition has long been prevented by the real seat doctrine prevailing in private international law of many EU and EEA member countries, which essentially required companies to be incorporated in the state where their main office was located. However, in a series of cases between 1999 and 2003 (Centros Ltd. vs. Erhvervs- og Selskabsstyrelsen, Überseering BV v Nordic Construction Company Baumanagement GmbH, Kamer van Koophandel en Fabrieken voor Amsterdam v Inspire Art Ltd.), the European Court of Justice has forced member states to recognize companies chartered in other member states, which is likely to foster regulatory competition in European company law. For instance, in 2008, Germany adopted new regulations on the GmbH (Limited Liability Company), allowing the incorporation of Limited Liability Companies [UG (haftungsbeschränkt)] without a minimum capital of EUR 25,000 (though 25% of earnings have to be retained until this threshold is reached).

=== Labour law ===
Countries may, for instance, seek to attract foreign direct investment by enacting a lower minimum wage than other countries, or by making the labor market more flexible.

- International Transport Workers Federation v Viking Line ABP or The Rosella [2008] IRLR 143 (C-438/05

=== Taxation ===
- Tax competition

=== Environmental law ===
Legal scholars often cite environmental law as a field in which regulatory competition is particularly likely to produce a “race to the bottom” due to the externalities produced by changes in any individual state's environmental law. Because a state is unlikely to bear all of the costs associated with any environment damage caused by industries in that state, it has an incentive to lower standards below the level that would be desirable if the state were forced to bear all of the costs. One commonly cited example of this effect is clean air laws, as states may be incentivized to lower their standards to attract business, knowing that the effects of the increased pollution will be spread across a wide area, and not simply localized within the state. Furthermore, a reduction in the standards of one state will incentivize other states to similarly lower their standards so as to not lose business.

== Public services ==
=== Education ===
Sometimes higher-level governing bodies institute incentives to competition among lower-level governing bodies, an example being the Race to the Top program, designed by the United States Department of Education to spur reforms in state and local district K-12 education.

The German Federal Ministry of Education and Research likewise has initiated a program called InnoRegio to reward innovative practices.

=== Health ===
The high degree of politicization of the genetically modified organism issue made it a key battleground for competition for leadership, particularly between the European Commission and the European Council of Ministers. The result has been a protracted battle over agenda setting and issue framing and a cycle of competitive regulatory reinforcement.

=== Security ===
The struggle between insurgents and various Afghanistan states for power, control, popular support and legitimacy in the eyes of the public has been described as competitive governance.

While during the Cold War security was provided by centralized institutions such as NATO and the Warsaw Pact, now competing profit-seeking firms provide personal, national, and international security.

== Theory ==
Arnold Kling notes, "In democratic government, people take jurisdictions as given, and they elect leaders. In competitive government, people take leaders as given, and they select jurisdictions." Competitive governance has thus far not produced an ultra-libertarian government; although Zac Gochenour has pointed out the role of potential international migrants' switching costs in hindering consumer choice from creating greater intergovernmental competition, Bryan Caplan has stated that "[t]he bigger problem is that almost all existing governments are either non-profits (the democracies), have short time horizons (the unstable dictatorships), or reasonably worry that if they liberalize they're lose power (the stable dictatorships)." Indeed, it has been argued by Maria Brouwer that most autocracies prefer stagnation to the vagaries inherent to expansion and other forms of innovation, since the exploration of new possibilities could lead to failure, which would undermine autocratic authority. There has been some question as to whether competitive governance can be revived in Australia.

Advantages

Brennan and Buchanan (1980) argue that the public sector is a 'Leviathan' which is inherently biased towards extracting money from taxpayers, but that competitive government structures can minimize such exploitation. It has also been argued that a decentralized competitive government structure allows for an experimentation of new public policies without doing too much harm if they fail.

Disadvantages

An alternative to market-based or competitive governance is civic-based or partnership governance. Alleged disadvantages of competitive governance, compared to collaborative government, include less potential to harness the power of knowledge sharing, cooperation and collaboration within government.

== See also ==
- International economics
- International law
- Charter city
- Corporate haven
- Tax haven
- Seasteading
- Jurisdictional arbitrage
- Indices of economic freedom
- Gross domestic product#Lists of GDP per capita
