= Lindsey Oil Refinery =

Oil refinery in North Killingholme

Phillips 66 Lindsey Oil Refinery
- Location within Lincolnshire
- Location: North Killingholme, North Lincolnshire, England; 53.64063°N 0.25782°W

Refinery details
- Owner: Phillips 66
- Opened: May 1968
- Capacity: 113,000 barrels per day (18,000 m^{3}/d)
- No. of employees: 415

Phillips 66 Lindsey Oil Refinery is an oil refinery in North Killingholme, North Lincolnshire, England owned and operated by Phillips 66. It lies to the north of the Humber Refinery, also owned by Phillips 66, and the railway line to the Port of Immingham. Immingham Power Station, owned by VPI Immingham, used to provide the steam for the fractionation processes.

The company owning the refinery filed for insolvency on 29 June 2025, prompting the Government of the United Kingdom to provide funding for special support and insolvency practitioners to maintain the refinery whilst a new buyer was sought. On 5 January 2026, Phillips 66 agreed terms to buy Lindsey Oil Refinery.

== History and operation ==
The site was announced in Belgium on 17 February 1965. East Midlands Gas Board had built a £6.5 million site in 1965, in conjunction with Total. The Prince of Wales visited this site on 19 June 1968, later visiting nearby gas field sites in the North Sea.

In the early 1970s the CEGB had planned a 4,000 MW oil power station nearby, and another oil power station at Insworke in Cornwall. Both would be cancelled in March 1975.

=== Construction ===
Construction began in November 1965, by Lummus Company. The refinery would process 65,000 barrels per day, which was 3.5 million tons per year. It was planned to open in 1967. Storage tanks were built by William Neill of Merseyside.

On Thursday 10 August 1967, around 4 pm, a 49 year old construction worker, for Sir Robert McAlpine, was killed, after falling 15 feet on a scaffold. There were 2,000 construction workers. Qualified first aid staff were not sufficient. The worker died in the ambulance.

There was an explosion in a boiler house at 10.20 am on 27 November 1967, injured four construction workers. 21 year old Peter Adams, of 65 Macaulay Street in Grimsby, died in an ambulance when being transferred from Scartho Road Hospital to Sheffield.

=== Opening ===
By the end of 1968, UK refining capacity would be 96 million tons, an increase of 18.8million tons during that year. The refinery cost £30m. The neighbouring refinery also cost £30 milliom.

It was officially opened on Friday 28 June 1968 by the Minister of Power, Ray Gunter.

It was named after the former Lindsey pre-1974 local government area of Lincolnshire.

The refinery entered service in May 1968 as a joint project between Total and Fina.

=== Operation ===
In September 1971 it processed the first North Sea oil from the Norwegian Ekofisk field, from a 30,000 ton tanker.

In 1999, Total took full control of the plant, when it bought Fina.

It used to produce around 35 types of product and process circa 113,000 barrels of oil per day.

Crude oil used to be imported via two pipelines, connecting the 1,000-metre jetty five miles away at the Port of Immingham, to the refinery.

In March 2021, the refinery was bought by Prax Group from Total.

As of 28 April 2026, Phillips 66 Limited owns the assets of Prax Lindsey Oil Refinery Limited, including the site in Lincolnshire, plus Prax Storage Lindsey Limited, Prax Terminals Killingholme Limited, Prax Terminals Jarrow Limited and Prax Downstream UK Limited.

=== Production units ===
More units were added, to take refining capacity to 7 million tons in the early 1970s, at a cost of £10 million. The French and Belgian companies had a half of the total capacity each.

From 1973 a 64-mile pipeline was built, to the north west by Total. The £500,000 oil terminal, in Leeds, had opened in April 1968, with oil transported by British Rail.

Further units added, from 1976, to open in 1979, costing £58 million. 1,500 construction workers worked on the development.

By 1977 it was the sixth-largest refinery in the UK, processing around 10 million tonnes. A catalytic cracker was built from 1977, which would process 1 million tonnes per year, being one third more efficient at fuel processing than previous technology.

In the 1980s, a fluid catalytic cracker, an alkylation unit, a visbreaker, and an MTBE (Methyl tert-butyl ether) unit (for high octane petrol) were added. In May 1982 a £50 million development was begun.

From 1988, the Belgian company built a pipeline to an oil terminal Hertfordshire.

By 1998 the site was processing 200,000 barrels per day, and was the UK's third-largest refinery.

In 2007, a distillate hydrotreater (HDS) was built. A hydrogen production unit (a methane steam reformer for the hydrotreater process) is being built, for completion in 2009. The new plant will provide ultra-low sulfur diesel and mean different types of crude oil can be processed, that can be made in a conventional catalytic cracker or hydrocracker. It was built from June 2008 – June 2009 by Jacobs Engineering.

=== 2009 workers dispute ===
On 28 January 2009, approximately 800 of Lindsey Oil Refinery's local contractors went on strike following the appointment by the Italian construction contractor IREM of several hundred European (mainly Italian and Portuguese) contractors on the site at a time of high unemployment in the local and global economy.

Subsequently, sympathy walkouts at other UK petroleum, power and chemical sites took place. 700 workers were sacked at the plant in June 2009, resulting in further worker walkouts at other UK sites. Negotiations led to the reinstatement of 647 workers at the end of June 2009.

=== 2025 financial difficulties ===
On 30 June 2025, Prax Group's parent company, State Oil, entered insolvency. This was reported to be largely due to operating losses at the Lindsey refinery. The move put over 400 jobs at the refinery at risk. The government agreed to a financial indemnity for the official receiver to allow the refinery to continue operating while the search for a buyer was carried out.

As of 5 January 2026, 250 staff remained employed and Phillips 66 (owners of the adjacent Humber Oil Refinery) has purchased the complex, although currently have no plans to continue stand-alone refining.

== Accidents and incidents ==
=== 2004 pollution incident ===
In December 2004, the failure of an oil pipeline at the Lindsey refinery resulted in 60,000 litres of crude oil leaking into the Humber Estuary.

The Environment Agency prosecuted Total, the-then owner of the refinery, regarding the incident and in December 2005, the company pleaded guilty and were fined £12,500 plus £5,651 costs for allowing to leak to take place. The Environment Agency said the incident did not result in any long-term impact on the environment.

=== 2010 accident ===
On Tuesday 29 June 2010 an explosion and subsequent fire broke out at the plant, killing Robert Greenacre, a 24-year-old worker, and injuring others. It originated beneath an Atmospheric Distillation Column (CDU-2) at a steam out point where maintenance was being carried out. Total reported that firefighters had found traces of asbestos in the refinery's crude oil distillation unit three days after the initial explosion.
