= Wilson and Palmer v United Kingdom =

Wilson v United Kingdom
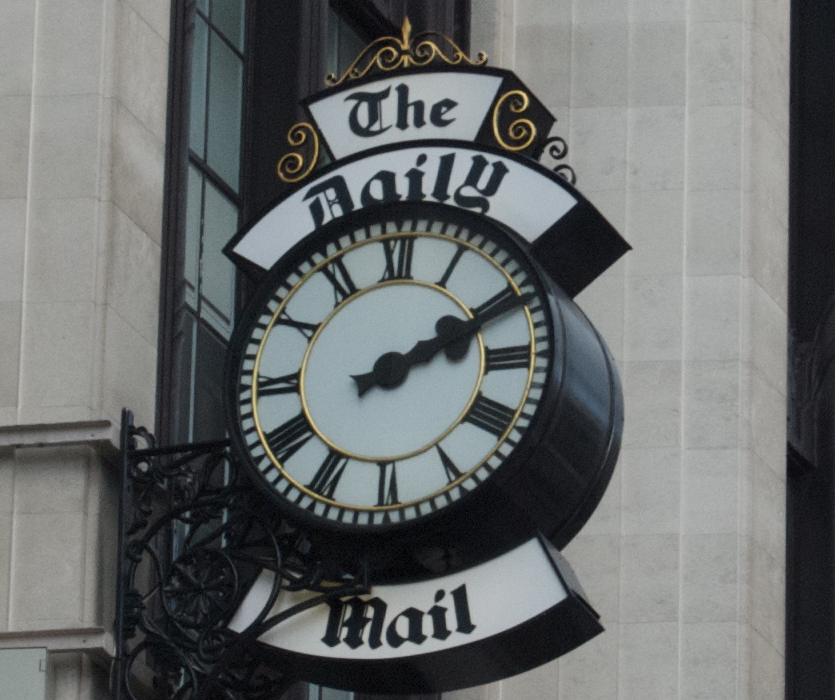
- Court: European Court of Human Rights
- Full case name: Wilson and National Union of Journalists, Palmer and NURMTW, Doolan and others v United Kingdom
- Citations: [2002] ECHR 552, [2002] IRLR 568, (2002) 35 EHRR 20 (applications nos. 30668/96, 30671/96 and 30678/96)

Case history
- Prior action: [1995] 2 AC 454; [1995] 2 All ER 100

Keywords
- Union discrimination, freedom of association

Wilson v United Kingdom [2002] ECHR 552 is a United Kingdom labour law and European labour law case concerning discrimination by employers against their workers who join and take action through trade unions. After a long series of appeals through the UK court system, the European Court of Human Rights held that ECHR article 11 protects the fundamental right of people to join a trade union, engage in union related activities and take action as a last resort to protect their interests.

== Facts ==
Mr Wilson worked for the Daily Mail newspaper. The paper derecognised the National Union of Journalists. Pay was increased for workers who took individual contracts, instead of staying on terms negotiated through collective agreement. Mr Wilson chose not to shift to an individual contract. His salary was not increased as quickly as those of the rest of his colleagues.

Mr Palmer worked for the ports in Southampton. His employer offered him an individual contract, coupled with a 10% pay increase, but on the condition that he would cease to be represented by the RMT. Mr Palmer refused to move to an individual contract. Unlike that of the other workers, his pay was increased by 8.9%, and he did not benefit as others did from a private medical insurance plan. The company then derecognised the union.

Both parties, together with their union, complained that their right to take part in trade union activities was violated under UK law, and if not that UK law, in particular under the Trade Union and Labour Relations (Consolidation) Act 1992 section 148(3) failed to comply with international standards, and the European Convention on Human Rights article 11.

== Judgment ==
=== Court of Appeal ===
In the Court of Appeal Dillon LJ, Butler-Sloss LJ and Farquharson LJ held that the employers' conduct had infringed the then-effective Employment Protection (Consolidation) Act 1978 s 23. The employers' action was intended to deter employees from being trade union members and such deterrence was a wholly foreseeable consequence.

=== House of Lords ===
In the House of Lords, Lord Keith, Lord Bridge, Lord Browne-Wilkinson, Lord Slynn and Lord Lloyd overturned the Court of Appeal. They held that employers withholding a pay rise from employees was not "action short of dismissal". It was an omission, and should be interpreted as such given the complex legislative history of the provision. Moreover, the Tribunal had never established that the employers' purpose was to deter its employees from joining a union or penalising them from membership. So the legislation here did not protect Wilson or Palmer's activities.

Nicholas Underhill QC and Brian Napier acted for Associated Newspapers, and Patrick Elias QC and Nigel Giffin acted for Associated British Ports, while John Hendy QC and Jennifer Eady acted for Mr Wilson and Jeffrey Burke QC and Peter Clark acted for Mr Palmer.

=== European Court of Human Rights ===
The European Court of Human Rights held that the effect of UK law was to allow employers to treat employees that were unprepared to renounce the right to consult a union less favourably. The use of financial incentives to induce employees to surrender union rights violated ECHR article 11, since it effectively frustrated the union's ability to strive for protection of its members. Unions have the right to make representations to employers and ultimately take action to protect their interests.

41. The Court observes at the outset that although the essential object of Article 11 is to protect the individual against arbitrary interference by public authorities with the exercise of the rights protected, there may in addition be positive obligations to secure the effective enjoyment of these rights. In the present case, the matters about the applicants complain—principally, the employers' de-recognition of the unions for collective bargaining purposes and offers of more favourable conditions of employment to employees agreeing not to be represented by the unions—did not involve direct intervention by the State. The responsibility of the United Kingdom would, however, be engaged if these matters resulted from a failure on its part to secure to the applicants under domestic law the rights set forth in Article 11 of the Convention.
42. The Court recalls that Article 11(1) presents trade union freedom as one form or a special aspects of freedom of association. The words "for the protection of his interests" in Article 11(1) are not redundant, and the Convention safeguards freedom to protect the occupational interests of trade union members by trade union action, the conduct and development of which the Contracting States must both permit and make possible. A trade union must thus be free to strive for the protection of its members' interests, and the individual members have a right, in order to protect their interests, that the trade union should be heard. Article 11 does not, however, secure any particular treatment of trade unions or their members and leaves each State a free choice of the means to be used to secure the right to be heard.
43. The Court notes that, at the time of the events complained of by the applicants, United Kingdom law provided for a wholly voluntary system of collective bargaining, with no legal obligation on employers to recognise trade unions for the purposes of collective bargaining. There was, therefore, no remedy in law by which the applicants could prevent the employers in the present case from de-recognising the unions and refusing to renew the collective bargaining agreements.
44. However, the Court has consistently held that although collective bargaining may be one of the ways by which trade unions may be enabled to protect their members' interests, it is not indispensable for the effective enjoyment of trade union freedom. Compulsory collective bargaining would impose on employers an obligation to conduct negotiations with trade unions. The Court has not yet been prepared to hold that the freedom of a trade union to make its voice heard extends to imposing on an employer an obligation to recognise a trade union. The union and its members must however be free, in one way or another, to seek to persuade the employer to listen to what it has to say on behalf of its members. In view of the sensitive character of the social and political issues involved in achieving a proper balance between the competing interests and the wide degree of divergence between the domestic systems in this field, the Contracting States enjoy a wide margin of appreciation as to how trade union freedom may be secured.
45. The Court observes that there were other measures available to the applicant unions by which they could further their members' interests. In particular, domestic law conferred protection on a trade union which called for or supported strike action "in contemplation or furtherance of a trade dispute". The grant of the right to strike, while it may be subject to regulation, represents one of the most important of the means by which the State may secure a trade union's freedom to protect its members' occupational interests. Against this background, the Court does not consider that the absence under United Kingdom law of an obligation on employers to enter into collective bargaining gave rise, in itself, to a violation of Article 11 of the Convention.
46. The Court agrees with the Government that the essence of a voluntary system of collective bargaining is that it must be possible for a trade union which is not recognised by an employer to take steps including, if necessary, organising industrial action, with a view to persuading the employer to enter into collective bargaining with it on those issues which the union believes are important for its members' interests. Furthermore, it is of the essence of the right to join a trade union for the protection of their interests that employees should be free to instruct or permit the union to make representations to their employer or to take action in support of their interests on their behalf. If workers are prevented from so doing, their freedom to belong to a trade union, for the protection of their interests, becomes illusory. It is the role of the State to ensure that trade union members are not prevented or restrained from using their union to represent them in attempts to regulate their relations with their employers.
47. In the present case, it was open to the employers to seek to pre-empt any protest on the part of the unions or their members against the imposition of limits on voluntary collective bargaining, by offering those employees who acquiesced in the termination of collective bargaining substantial pay rises, which were not provided to those who refused to sign contracts accepting the end of union representation. The corollary of this was that United Kingdom law permitted employers to treat less favourably employees who were not prepared to renounce a freedom that was an essential feature of union membership. Such conduct constituted a disincentive or restraint on the use by employees of union membership to protect their interests. However, as the House of Lords' judgment made clear, domestic law did not prohibit the employer from offering an inducement to employees who relinquished the right to union representation, even if the aim and outcome of the exercise was to bring an end to collective bargaining and thus substantially to reduce the authority of the union, as long as the employer did not act with the purpose of preventing or deterring the individual employee simply from being a member of a trade union.
48. Under United Kingdom law at the relevant time it was, therefore, possible for an employer effectively to undermine or frustrate a trade union's ability to strive for the protection of its members' interests. The Court notes that this aspect of domestic law has been the subject of criticism by the Social Charter's Committee of Independent Experts and the ILO's Committee on Freedom of Association (see paragraphs 32–33 and 37 above). It considers that, by permitting employers to use financial incentives to induce employees to surrender important union rights, the respondent State has failed in its positive obligation to secure the enjoyment of the rights under Article 11 of the Convention. This failure amounted to a violation of Article 11, as regards both the applicant trade unions and the individual applicants.

== Significance ==
Having been found to stand in breach of international labour law standards in general, and ECHR art 11 in particular, the UK government set about consulting on how to amend TULRCA 1992 to comply with the judgment, but with the objective of changing the law no further than absolutely necessary to comply with the ruling. The result was the Employment Relations Act 2004, which changed, in particular, TULRCA 1992 section 146 to stipulate that all "workers" were protected by the provisions on detriment for union membership and activities.

== See also ==
- Demir and Baykara v Turkey [2008] ECHR 1345
