= Social clause =

Within the context of international trade, a social clause is the integration of sustainability standards, such as the core ILO labour rights conventions into trade agreements, whilst within the context of public procurement a social clause is a contract clause which requires the provider of goods or services to a public body to meet a social objective in the course of performing their obligations.

During the World Trade Organization Ministerial Conference of 1996, it became clear that no multilateral social clause would be adopted. There are social clauses in bilateral and plurilateral agreements.

== See also ==
- Decent work agenda of the ILO
- International Labour Organization Conventions
- Labour movement
