= Robinson-Steele v RD Retail Services Ltd =

European and UK labour law case

- Court: European Court of Justice
- Full case name: Caulfield v Hanson Clay Products Ltd and Robinson-Steele v RD Retail Services Ltd
- Citation: (2006) C-131/04, [2006] IRLR 386

Keywords
- Working Time Directive

Robinson-Steele v RD Retail Services Ltd (2006) C-131/04 is a European labour law and UK labour law case concerning the Working Time Directive, which is relevant for the Working Time Regulations 1998.

== Facts ==
Employers would give people 'rolled up' holiday pay, by adding a so-called 'premium' to wages if holidays were not taken. In three cases a Tribunal and the Court of Appeal referred to the European Court of Justice the question whether this was permissible under the Working Time Directive article 7, which states that annual leave must be taken, and only if the employment relationship terminates may there be a pay in lieu.

=== Robinson-Steele v RD Retail Services Ltd ===
Mr Robinson-Steele worked as a redevelopment agent from April 2002 to December 2003, 5 days a week, or 4 nights a week, in 12-hour shifts, with a one-week break over Christmas 2002. His first 'temporary worker' contract stated entitlement to leave was rolled into his ordinary pay at 8.33% of his hourly rate of £6.25 in the day and £7.75 at night per hour.

The Leeds Employment Tribunal held there was a conflict between an Employment Appeal Tribunal decision and the decision of the Inner House of the Court of Session, in MPS Structure Ltd v Munro over whether such 'rolled up holiday pay' was lawful. It made a reference to the ECJ.

=== Clarke v Frank Staddon Ltd ===
Mr. Clarke worked as a hod carrier and brick cutter for Frank Staddon Ltd from 2 April to 23 June 2001. He was on holiday until 24 July 2001, and went back to work but was not paid between 23 June and 24 July. His contract said holiday pay is included within the daily rate of £85 per day (an August pay slip said: ‘Basic 8.689 Holiday 0.756 = £85 per day), but in his contract, before August 2001 there was no breakdown of the holiday pay in his payslips. He claimed holiday pay from 2 April to 16 November 2001.

The Tribunal dismissed his application, and the EAT dismissed the appeal. The Court of Appeal held that the Tribunal found there was a break in the continuity of the contract from 23 June to 24 July, and then a new contract. The EAT had ordered the case be referred back to the Tribunal to decide whether before August 2001 there had been any holiday pay in the contract, and any break in employment.

=== Caulfield v Marshalls Clay Products Ltd ===
Mr. Caulfield worked for Marshalls Clay Products Ltd as general operators in the clay-making factory at Accrington. He worked 4 days on, 4 days off, except Christmas and Boxing Day. Employees were not paid for the days when they did not work. The GMB collective agreement, incorporated into contracts, stated in clause 3 that holiday pay would be incorporated into the hourly rate, and holidays are taken during the rest day periods in the rota system. Each person could also get two 8-day consecutive breaks, and one 16-day consecutive break, with the timing, agreed locally, and by pooling their 4-day breaks and agreeing with other staff to cover for them while they were off. They had 31 days of holiday per year, and the hourly rate included 13.36% holiday pay. If there was overtime, employees would get 30%, 50%, or 100% more in respect of both normal and holiday pay. Mr. Caulfield and his colleagues took a holiday in June 2001 for up to 16 days, and also rest days. In the end, they worked 182 days, with 24.32 days' holiday pay, at £6.629 in normal pay and 88.6p for holiday pay. They claimed holiday pay for the period between 1 October 1998 and 3 September 2001, arguing the 8 and 16-day leave periods meant they did just as much as other workers who stuck to the 4 days' on 4 days' off system.

The Manchester Employment Tribunal held they should be compensated. The EAT allowed the company's appeal. The Court of Appeal held rolled-up holiday pay did not discourage workers from taking holiday, that this arrangement was properly negotiated by a collective agreement, which was legitimate, and it was not incompatible with the Directive or the WTR 1998. But it referred to the ECJ asking whether rolled-up holiday pay violated article 7 of the Directive; was it different if no more pay was given after a contract inserted a rolled-up holiday pay term; if yes can credit be given for that payment to set off the entitlement under the Directive; and does the employer need to pay the worker during the period of leave or can payments be made in installments throughout the year?

== Judgment ==
The European Court of Justice held that giving rolled-up holiday pay was not permissible, because it could create a disincentive for workers to take holidays. Holidays are a principle of Community law from which there could be no derogations. Article 7(1) was intended to enable workers to take leave. The point of payment for holidays was that a worker would be in a position comparable during leave as when leave is taken. Article 7(2) made clear that a payment in lieu could be taken only where the employment relationship is terminated. Otherwise, the right to leave would effectively be replaced by a payment in lieu. However, employers are entitled to set off rolled-up pay against periods of leave that are "actually taken".

48 in that regard, it must be recalled that the entitlement of every worker to paid annual leave must be regarded as a particularly important principle of Community social law from which there can be no derogations and whose implementation by the competent national authorities must be confined within the limits expressly laid down by the directive itself (see Case C-173/99 BECTU [2001] ECR I-4881, paragraph 43).

49 The holiday pay required by Article 7(1) of the directive is intended to enable the worker actually to take the leave to which he is entitled.

[...]

58 The Directive treats entitlement to annual leave and to a payment on that account as being two aspects of a single right. The purpose of the requirement of payment for that leave is to put the worker, during such leave, in a position which is, as regards remuneration, comparable to periods of work.

59 Accordingly, without prejudice to more favourable provisions under article 15 of the Directive, the point at which the payment for annual leave is made must be fixed in such a way that, during that leave, the worker is, as regards remuneration, put in a position comparable to periods of work.

60 Furthermore, account must be taken of the fact that, under Article 7(2) of the directive, the minimum period of paid annual leave may not be replaced by an allowance in lieu, except where the employment relationship is terminated. That prohibition is intended to ensure that a worker is normally entitled to actual rest, with a view to ensuring effective protection of his health and safety (see, to that effect, BECTU, cited above, paragraph 44, and Case C-342/01 Merino Gómez [2004] ECR I-2605, paragraph 30).

61 A regime such as that referred to by the questions at issue may lead to situations in which, without the conditions laid down in Article 7(2) of the directive being met, the minimum period of paid annual leave is, in effect, replaced by an allowance in lieu.

62 It is appropriate to add that Article 7 of the directive is not one of the provisions from which the directive expressly allows derogations (see BECTU, paragraph 41). Therefore, it does not matter whether such a regime of paid annual leave is or is not based on a contractual arrangement.

63 It follows from all the foregoing considerations that the reply to the first question referred in each of Cases C-131/04 and C-257/04 and to the fourth question referred in Case C-257/04 must be that Article 7 of the directive precludes the payment for minimum annual leave within the meaning of that provision from being made in the form of part payments staggered over the corresponding annual period of work and paid together with the remuneration for work done, rather than in the form of a payment in respect of a specific period during which the worker actually takes leave.

The second question referred in Case C-131/04 and the third question referred in Case C-257/04

64 By those questions, the referring courts are asking, in essence, whether Article 7 of the directive precludes amounts paid to a worker as holiday pay under a regime such as that described in the preceding paragraph of this judgment from being set off against the entitlement to paid annual leave under that article.

65 The question is therefore whether payments in respect of minimum annual leave, within the meaning of that provision, already made within the framework of such a regime contrary to the directive, may be set off against the entitlement to payment for a specific period during which the worker actually takes leave.

66 in that situation, Article 7 of the directive does not preclude, as a rule, sums additional to remuneration payable for work done which have been paid, transparently and comprehensibly, as holiday pay, from being set off against the payment for specific leave.

67 However, the Member States are required to take the measures appropriate to ensure that practices incompatible with Article 7 of the directive are not continued.

68 in any event, in the light of the mandatory nature of the entitlement to annual leave and in order to ensure the practical effect of Article 7 of the directive, such set-off is excluded where there is no transparency or comprehensibility. The burden of proof in that respect is on the employer.

69 The answer, therefore, to the second question referred in Case C-131/04 and the third question referred in Case C-257/04 must be that Article 7 of the directive does not preclude, as a rule, sums paid, transparently and comprehensibly, in respect of minimum annual leave, within the meaning of that provision, in the form of part payments staggered over the corresponding annual period of work and paid together with the remuneration for work done, from being set off against the payment for specific leave which is actually taken by the worker.

== See also ==
- UK labour law
- Working Time Directive
- Lyddon v Englefield Brickwork Ltd [2008] IRLR 198 (EAT)
