= Working time in the United Kingdom =

Working time in the United Kingdom is regulated in UK labour law in respect of holidays, daily breaks, night work and the maximum working day under the Working Time Regulations 1998. While the traditional mechanisms for ensuring a "fair day's wage for a fair day's work" is by collective agreement, since 1962 the UK created minimum statutory rights for every individual at work. The WTR 1998 follow the requirements of the Working Time Directive, which allowed an "opt out" from the maximum working week, set at 48 hours. Other reforms have included the 28 holiday minimum per year, 20 minute breaks for each six hours worked, and a maximum average of 8 hours work in a 24-hour period for night-workers (the average is usually calculated over 17 weeks, but it can be over a longer period of up to 52 weeks if the workers and the employer agree). Minimum wages vary over individual hours.

== History ==
- Eight-hour day
- Six-hour day
- Three-Day Week
- Flexitime

== Holidays ==
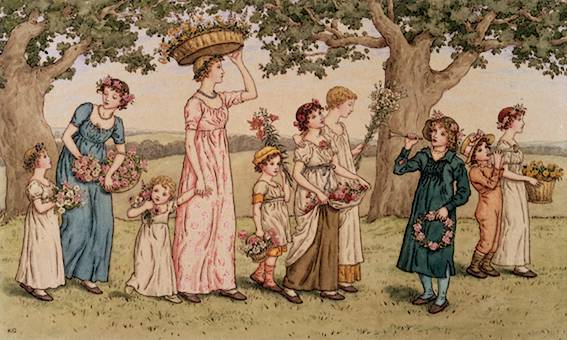
May Day is a traditional Spring celebration and synonymous with International Workers' Day. It had been a bank holiday since 1978, is one of 8 public holidays, and 28 days of total holiday every UK worker has under the Working Time Directive.

The most concrete measure of the WTR 1998 is, following basic rights in international law, mandating a minimum period of 28 days, or four full weeks, in paid holidays for all workers each year (though this includes public holidays). There is no qualifying period for this, or any other working time right, because beyond the importance of the law in seeking to strike a balance between work and life, sufficient periods of rest and leisure are seen as a critical element of workers health and safety. Nor is it possible for an employer to give a worker "rolled up holiday pay", for instance an additional 12.5% in a wage bill, in lieu of taking actual holidays. The employer must make sure the worker does in fact take paid holidays, and if the worker has not done so and the job terminates, the employer must give an additional payment for the unused holiday entitlement.

- British Airways plc v Williams [2010] UKSC 16, [2010] 3 CMLR 19
- Zentralbetriebsrat der Landeskrankenhäuser Tirols [2010] IRLR 631 (C-486/08) workers who move from full to part-time cannot lose their holiday entitlement.
- NHS Leeds v Larner (2011) EAT, Bean J held that the entitlement to paid annual leave under WTR 1998 rr 13 and 13A for a worker who was absent for the whole year because of sickness did not depend on the worker submitting a request for that annual leave before the end of the pay year. Stringer v Revenue and Customs Commissioners (C-520/06) (2009) All ER (EC) 906 and Pereda v Madrid Movilidad SA (C-277/08) (2009) ECR I-8405 followed.

== Night work ==
Where a person works at night, they may only do 12 hours in any 24-hour period on average, or simply 12 hours at most is dangerous. It can be called a night shift.

== Breaks ==
Every worker must receive at least 11 consecutive hours of rest in a 24-hour period, and in every day workers must have at least a 20-minute break in any 6-hour period.

== 48 hour working week ==
The most controversial and widely known provisions in the working time laws, however, concern the maximum working week. Under the Directive, this is 48 hours. Although people in the United Kingdom work the longest hours on average in Europe, and among the longest in the developed world, highest work related stress and absentee rates, successive UK governments have remained sceptical about the maximum working week's merit. The maximum does not apply to anyone who is self-employed or who can set their own hours of work, as it is aimed to protect workers who possess less bargaining power and autonomy over the way they do their jobs. Nevertheless, all UK workers may "opt out" of the 48-hour week by individually signing an opt out form. Theoretically a worker may always change her mind after having opted out, without suffering any detriment. If the employer has not got the worker to opt out, then the 48-hour week is not a rigid maximum, but is taken as an average over 17 weeks. The same rules have developed as for the minimum wage, regarding "on call" time, so that people with jobs involving long periods where they must make themselves available, but not necessarily be active, are regarded as working if they are bound to remain awake and close to their workplace. This created a significant problem for junior doctors, where the culture has typically been in all European countries that very long hours are expected. The European Court of Justice's decision in Landeshauptstadt Kiel v Jaegar that junior doctors' on call time was working time led a number of countries to exercise the same "opt out" derogation as the UK, albeit limited to medical practice. The Health and Safety Executive is the UK body charged with enforcing the working time laws, though it has purposively taken a "light touch" approach to enforcement.

== See also ==
- Trades Union Congress
- UK labour law
