= Sindicato de Médicos de Asistencia Pública =

Sindicato de Médicos de Asistencia Pública, the Spanish doctors' union, started on 22 August 1991, under the acronym SIMAP-CV. SIMAP is a union of doctors working in public health. Since its foundation has been involved in various initiatives to protect public health and the rights of physicians.

This union achieved notoriety by being the promoter of the SIMAP case before the European Court of Justice, referring to the working time of physicians. The SIMAP case (also known as Sindicato de Médicos de Asistencia Pública v Conselleria de Sanidad y Consumo de la Generalidad Valenciana) is a European labour law and UK labour law case concerning the Working Time Directive, which is relevant for the Working Time Regulations 1998.

At the European level, the SIMAP case had a significant impact in the regulation of working time and the implementation of Working Time Directive.

An editorial in the British Medical Journal in 2010 raises reversing the SiMAP and Jaeger rulings, renegotiating the new deal, relaxing immigration rules, and enhancing mobility between specialties will all give the NHS more flexibility to cope with its ever increasing demands.
