= HM Revenue and Customs v Stringer =

Stringer v HMRC
- Court: European Court of Justice
- Citations: [2009] UKHL 31, [2009] IRLR 214 (also, C-520/06 and C-350/06)

Case history
- Prior action: [2005] EWCA Civ 441

Keywords
- Working Time Directive

Her Majesty's Revenue and Customs v Stringer and Schultz-Hoff v Deutsche Rentenversicherung Bund [2009] UKHL 31 is a European labour law and UK labour law case concerning the Working Time Directive, which is relevant for the Working Time Regulations 1998.

== Facts ==
Workers were not paid for annual leave because they had had long-term illnesses. They requested that they be paid the holiday wage, which they could not take because they had been sick. One asked if she could take annual leave that she missed before, after she returned to work. The rest had been dismissed. They were all refused requests for pay for holidays, the lady who returned because the law said three months after the year in which the leave fell. They made a claim for unauthorised deductions under the Employment Rights Act 1996 sections 13 (the right) and 23 (a limit of three months since last deduction, but workers can claim for the whole of the deductions).

== Judgment ==
=== Court of Appeal ===
The Court of Appeal held that a claim for deduction of holiday pay could not be brought as an unauthorised deduction from wages under ERA 1996, applying WTR rr 13 and 14. The House of Lords in Commissioners of Inland Revenue v Ainsworth [2005] IRLR 465 referred the question to the ECJ.

=== European Court of Justice ===
The European Court of Justice held that legislation cannot allow that the right to take paid leave is extinguished at the end of the year if the worker does not work because of sickness. If employment is terminated then a worker is entitled to get an allowance of lieu according to Art 7(2). The purpose of the Directive, one of the most important social rights for workers, was to allow a period of rest and it was legitimate that if one was actually ill, there was no rest.

=== House of Lords ===
Back at the House of Lords, the Inland Revenue accepted that wages in lieu of holiday had to be paid, but that the more generous procedure for claiming under ERA 1996 was not open, because the definition of wages in s 27 was comprehensive and did not cover working time claims. It was deliberately never amended. Lord Rodger, Lord Walker and Lord Neuberger held that the Working Time Regulations 1998, regulation 30, which gives a time limit of three months only for each individual deduction, was not the only claim, and an action could be brought under the Employment Rights Act 1996. A payment under the Working Time Regulations 1998 regulation 14 was a sum payable to a worker in connection with employment, clearly within ERA 1996 s 27(1) and ‘holiday pay’ was there specifically. If it were not so, the principle of equivalence - that a no less favourable remedy would be available in national law as for EU law - would be infringed.

== See also ==
- UK labour law
- Working Time Directive
- Pereda v Madrid Movilidad [2009] IRLR 959 (C-277/08) the CFI held provided that employees who fall sufficiently ill before/whilst on holiday are entitled to insist that "missed" holiday be 'reinstated' and taken at a later date.
- Lyons v Mitie Security Ltd [2010] IRLR 288
