= National Minimum Wage Regulations 1999 =

- Statutory Instrument
- Parliament of the United Kingdom
- Citation: SI 1999/584
- Territorial extent: England and Wales; Scotland; Northern Ireland

Dates
- Made: 6 March 1999
- Commencement: 1 April 1999
- Revoked: 6 April 2015

Other legislation
- Made under: National Minimum Wage Act 1998
- Revoked by: National Minimum Wage Regulations 2015

Status: Revoked

Text of statute as originally enacted

The National Minimum Wage Regulations 1999 (SI 1999/584) were passed as a statutory instrument under the National Minimum Wage Act 1998 to specify various detailed points about how to calculate whether someone is being paid the minimum wage, who gets it, and how to enforce it.

== Contents ==
Regulations 3 to 6 define four different types of work that people do.

- r 3, time work
- r 4, salaried work
- r 5, output work
- r 6, unmeasured work
- r 7, travelling definition
- r 8 (and Part IV) wage includes incentive pay, bonuses and tips paid through the payroll
- r 9 (and Part IV) wage excludes benefits in kind (with exception of accommodation), overtime and shift premia
- r 10, definition of ‘pay reference period’ as one month, or a shorter period if that is how a worker is paid.
- r 12, excluded are au pairs and family members in family business
- r 15(1) ‘time work includes time when a worker is available at or near a place of work, other than his home, for the purpose of doing time work, and is required to be available for such work except that, in relations to a worker who by arrangement sleeps at or near a place of work, time during the hours he is permitted to sleep shall only be treated as being time work when the worker is awake for the purpose of working.’
- r 15(1A) a worker who is given suitable sleeping facilities is not doing work when not ‘awake for the purpose of working’.
- r 25, ‘output work’ does not easily translate to an hourly rate (e.g. work paid by results or work paid by commission). The employer must either pay minimum rate for each hour actually worked or ‘fair piece rate’
- r 26, adults in the first 26 weeks of accredited training can be paid at a lower rate
- r 27 if the worker is doing ‘unmeasured work’ then one will be paid according to how long one is spent carrying out the contractual duties required
- r 28, the employer can make a ‘daily average agreement’ with the worker to specify the period of time paid
- r 30, payments made in respect of the reference period are to be taken into account when calculating the wage paid.
- r 31, reductions to the wage paid can be disregarded as falling below the minimum wage if they include (b) deductions for industrial action absences (d) allowances other than for work (e) [tips, removed] (f) those under *r 34(1)(b), namely worker’s expenditure in connection with his employment (f) those under r 32, namely things for the worker’s ‘own use and benefit’ (g) (h) (i) amounts for living accommodation under rr 36 and 37.
- r 32, for r 31(1)(g) legitimate deductions can include ‘in respect of the worker’s expenditure in connection with his employment’ and (b) deductions ‘made by the employer for his [the worker’s] own use and benefit’
- r 33, deductions not to be subtracted under r 32(1)(g) or (b)? are (a) contractual liabilities, (b) loans (c) accidental overpayment of wages (d) share purchase.
- r 36, the amount deductible for accommodation is [£4.73 in October 2011] per day (2) living accommodation must be available all the time.
- r 38, records should be kept ‘sufficient to establish that he is remunerating the worker at a rate at least equal to the national minimum wage’

== See also ==
- Tax Credits and Child tax credit, Working tax credit
- Wage regulation
