= Krasner v McMath =

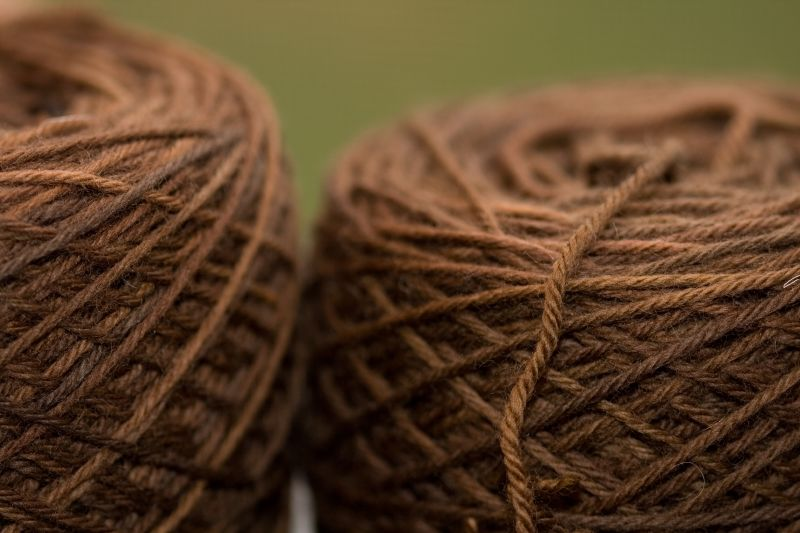
- Court: Court of Appeal of England and Wales
- Decided: 10 August 2005
- Citation: [2005] EWCA Civ 1072, [2005] BCC 915, [2005] IRLR 995

Court membership
- Judges sitting: Neuberger LJ, Clarke LJ and Jacob LJ

Keywords
- Consultation, redundancy, compensation, priority

Krasner v McMath [2005] EWCA Civ 1072 (also, Re Huddersfield Fine Worsteds Ltd) is a UK labour and insolvency law case concerning the priority of payments to workers of an insolvent company in priority to other creditors.

== Facts ==
Gerald Krasner was the administrator of an insolvent worsted company, in an appeal joined to another two companies. Barry McMath was one of the employees claiming that his right to compensation for the employer's failure to consult the workforce about redundancies was payable in priority to the expenses of administration. TULRCA 1992 s 188 gives the right to be consulted 90 days in advance where there are twenty or more dismissals, s 189 gives the right to a ‘protective award’ in lieu of consultation and s 190 specifies this should be one week's pay per missed week. Mr McMath's contract had been adopted (in priority to administration expenses) under the Insolvency Act 1986 Sch B1 para 99, and so was owed any ‘liability arising under a contract of employment’. Were protective awards in that category?

Peter Smith J in one case had held that they were payable in priority and Etherton J in the other had held they were not.

== Judgment ==
Neuberger LJ held that protective payments under TULRCA 1992 s 189 are not payable in priority to administration expenses. He noted that if a broad interpretation to ‘wages and salary’ is given under then it could hurt the purpose of rescuing insolvent companies, which was inspired by the Cork Report and underpinned the Insolvency Act 1986. This accorded with the natural meaning of IA 1986 para 99(5) and the list of payments in para 99(6), and accorded with the policy considerations surrounding rescue. In particular, many administrators would not decide that a rescue is possible if they know damages for failure to consult the workers who are retained and have their contracts adopted get super-priority for more than the work they do.

Clarke LJ and Jacob LJ concurred in the judgment.

== See also ==
- European Union Insolvency Protection Directive 2008/94/EC
- Employment Rights Act 1996 ss 166–170, 182–190
- Regeling v Bestuur van de Bedrijfsvereniging voor de Metaalnijverheid [1999] IRLR 379 (C-125/97)
- Robins v Secretary of State for Work and Pensions [2007] ICR 779 (C-278/05)
- Insolvency Act 1986 Sch B1, paras 3 and 99
- Powdrill v Watson
