= Association de médiation sociale v Union locale des syndicats CGT =

AMS v Union locale des syndicats CGT
- Court: European Court of Justice
- Citation: (2014) C-176/12

Keywords
- Human rights

Association de médiation sociale v Union locale des syndicats CGT (2014) C-176/12 is an EU law case, concerning the protection of human rights in the European Union.

== Facts ==
The Charter of Fundamental Rights of the European Union article 27 says workers must be ‘guaranteed information and consultation in good time’. This was implemented by the Information and Consultation Directive 2002 (2002/14/EC) in part. The French Labour Code, article L. 1111-3 excluded workers with non-standard employment contracts from staff numbers to determine legal thresholds for constituting bodies representing staff. The Union locale des syndicats CGT, a trade union, claimed this violated both the Charter and the Directive.

In his Opinion, Advocate General Cruz Villalón opposed the direct applicability of the Charter. He said ‘the recognition of particular economic and social rights would result in the judicialisation of public policy, particularly in areas of significant budgetary importance.’

== Judgment ==
The Court of Justice, Grand Chamber, held the Directive article 2(d) and article 3 defines who is to be included in its scope, and does not allow the exclusion of certain groups of workers when calculating the number of staff. However the Charter article 27 was not precise enough to say that national law could not exclude some categories of workers.

39 Nevertheless, the Court has stated that this principle of interpreting national law in conformity with European Union law has certain limits. Thus the obligation on a national court to refer to the content of a directive when interpreting and applying the relevant rules of domestic law is limited by general principles of law and it cannot serve as the basis for an interpretation of national law contra legem (see Case C-268/06 Impact [2008] ECR I-2483, paragraph 100, and Dominguez, paragraph 25).

40 In the case in the main proceedings, it is apparent from the order for reference that the Cour de cassation is faced with such a limitation, so that Article L. 1111-3 of the Labour Code cannot be interpreted in conformity with Directive 2002/14.

41 Accordingly, it is necessary to ascertain, thirdly, whether the situation in the case in the main proceedings is similar to that in the case which gave rise to Kükükdeveci, so that Article 27 of the Charter, by itself or in conjunction with the provisions of Directive 2002/14, can be invoked in a dispute between individuals in order to preclude, as the case may be, the application of the national provision which is not in conformity with that directive.

42 In respect of Article 27 of the Charter, as such, it should be recalled that it is settled case-law that the fundamental rights guaranteed in the legal order of the European Union are applicable in all situations governed by European Union law (see Case C-617/10 Åkerberg Fransson [2013] ECR, paragraph 19)

[...]

47 In this connection, the facts of the case may be distinguished from those which gave rise to Kücükdeveci in so far as the principle of non‑discrimination on grounds of age at issue in that case, laid down in Article 21(1) of the Charter, is sufficient in itself to confer on individuals an individual right which they may invoke as such.

48 Accordingly, Article 27 of the Charter cannot, as such, be invoked in a dispute, such as that in the main proceedings, in order to conclude that the national provision which is not in conformity with Directive 2002/14 should not be applied.

49 That finding cannot be called into question by considering Article 27 of the Charter in conjunction with the provisions of Directive 2002/14, given that, since that article by itself does not suffice to confer on individuals a right which they may invoke as such, it could not be otherwise if it is considered in conjunction with that directive.

== See also ==
- European Union law
