= Commission v United Kingdom (C-484/04) =

European labour law and UK labour law case

- Court: European Court of Justice
- Citations: (2006) C-484/04, [2006] IRLR 888

Keywords
- Working Time Directive

Commission v United Kingdom (2006) C-484/04 is a European labour law and UK labour law case concerning the Working Time Directive, which is relevant for the Working Time Regulations 1998.

== Facts ==
The UK Department of Trade and Industry (now the Department of Business, Innovation and Skills) stated in guideline to employers on the Working Time Regulations 1998 that ‘Employers must make sure that workers can take their rest, but are not required to make sure that they do take their rest.’ Also, Statutory Instrument 1999/3372 had amended regulation 20 to exempt workers whose work was but partly unmeasured, so working time and night work control applied only to unmeasured or predetermined time.

== Judgment ==
The European Court of Justice held that the UK government's guidance advocated a breach of the Directive, article 4. There is a duty to guarantee that the right to rest is in fact observed. It also declared the 1999 amendment to be contrary to art 17, though the UK government had already backtracked with SI 2006/99 regulation 2.

== See also ==
- UK labour law
- Working Time Directive
- Corps of Commissionaires Management Ltd v Hughes [2009] IRLR 122, also on rest
- Gallagher v Alpha Catering Services Ltd [2005] IRLR 102, Peter Gibson LJ, [50] a rest break must be fixed in advance of its commencement
