= Barber v RJB Mining (UK) Ltd =

UK labour law case

- Court: High Court of Justice
- Citation: [1999] ICR 679

Keywords
- Working Time Directive

Barber v RJB Mining (UK) Ltd [1999] ICR 679 is a UK labour law case concerning the Working Time Directive and the Working Time Regulations 1998.

== Facts ==
Pit deputies refused to opt out of the 48-hour week. They had always worked over 48 hours in each of the 17 weeks since the Working Time Regulations 1998 came into force. They wanted an injunction for their Working Time Regulations 1998 regulation 4 rights. They argued the regulations were incorporated into their contracts of employment. The employers argued that there was no such right, but merely that Working Time Regulations 1998 regulation 4(2) required employers to take ‘reasonable steps’ to ensure the duty was complied with and the obligation could only be justiciable if the workers had suffered detriment or dismissal.

== Judgment ==
Gage J held that ‘Parliament intended that all contracts of employment should be read so as to provide that an employee should work no more than an average of 48 hours in any week during the reference period.’ He said that the employees were entitled to stop working until their hours rights were complied with, because the Working Time Regulations 1998 gave rise to a contractual obligation on the employer’s part. He did not issue an injunction, however, because it was in the context of an industrial dispute and that would give the claimants here the right to stop work for 5 weeks and 2 weeks. So it would be left up to the individuals, in this case, to choose.
