= Landeshauptstadt Kiel v Jaeger =

Landeshauptstadt Kiel v Jaegar
- Court: European Court of Justice
- Decided: 9 September 2003
- Citations: (2003) C-151/02, [2003] ECR I-08389

Keywords
- Working Time Directive

Landeshauptstadt Kiel v Jaegar (2003) C-151/02 is a European labour law case concerning the EU Working Time Directive.

== Facts ==
Dr. Jaeger, a doctor working at a hospital, was required to remain on-call between shifts. A room was provided at the hospital for Dr. Jaeger to sleep. According to the collective agreement, the average working time when on-call (covering periods between 16 and 25 hours) should not exceed 49% of the on-call period. Dr. Jaeger, however, contended that all on-call time should be considered as working time.

Seeking clarification, the Bundesarbeitsgericht requested a preliminary ruling to determine whether, under Articles 3 and 6 of 93/104/EC (as implemented by Germany's Law on Working Time 1994 §5 III), time spent on-call was indeed considered working time. This law stated that Dr. Jaeger was required to remain at work, but could sleep if work was not required. On average, Dr. Jaeger did spend 49% of his time on-call, and the time spent inactive was categorised as a rest period.

== Judgment ==
The European Court of Justice ruled that all time Dr. Jaeger was mandated to be at the hospital, including when sleeping, should be classified as working time. The court noted that after the SIMAP case, the Directive could not be interpreted to treat inactive on-call time as a rest period. The court also found that Dr. Jaeger was subjected to more constraints than a doctor at home, as he was separated from his family and social environment.

The 1994 Act was found to breach the Directive by allowing Dr. Jaeger's collective agreement to only offset active on-call time. Under Article 17, a derogation to allow for a reduction of the daily minimum rest of 8 hours could only be granted if an immediate rest period followed, and such a reduction could not permit the maximum weekly working time to be exceeded.

== Significance ==
In the wake of the ECJ's decision, the European Commission proposed in COM (2004) 607 final that time spent at work on-call should not necessarily be classified as 'working time'. However, this proposal was not adopted. Instead, there was a significant increase in the number of opt-outs for health work from member states in response to the ruling. Notably, 15 governments apply these opt-outs, predominantly concerning health care.

== See also ==
- Working Time Directive
- Pfeiffer v Deutsches Rotes Kreuz
- Commission v United Kingdom (C-484/04)
