= Chacón Navas v Eurest Colectividades SA =

EU labour law case

- Court: European Court of Justice
- Citations: (2006) C-13/05, [2006] IRLR 706, [2007] All ER (EC) 59

Keywords
- Disability discrimination

Chacón Navas v Eurest Colectividades SA (2006) C-13/05 is an EU labour law case that sets forth a uniform definition of disability in the European Union. Both the Treaty of Amsterdam and the EU Framework Directive on Employment left open the definition of disability, which allowed the Court to adopt its own definition.

The judgment has been criticised by academics as potentially being too close to a medical model of disability (although it does not require medical diagnosis of a disability), rather than the social model of disability.

== Facts ==
Ms Navas, an employee of a catering company, was sick and waiting for an operation. The ECJ decision does not contain any detail about what illness prevented her from working for eight months.

After eight months her employers wrote to her purporting to end her employment. In the letter they admitted that the termination was 'unlawful' (Spanish industrial law allows unlawful termination with financial compensation). She claimed that the termination was instead 'void' and sought reinstatement according to anti-discrimination provisions. She made her claim to the Spanish Courts under the disability provisions of Spanish law, which were in turn based on the EU Framework Equality Directive 2000/78/EC.

== Judgment ==
=== Domestic courts ===
The domestic Spanish labour courts agreed with Ms Navas' employers that illness did not amount to 'disability', which was the subject of the EU directive and that Spanish law allowed Eurest to fire Navas based on their cost benefit analysis (i.e. financial compensation versus continuing to employ her). This interpretation allows employers to discriminate against sick people, as opposed to people with disability.

=== Advocate General ===
Advocate General Ad Geelhoed issued an opinion based on a medical model of disability. He also stated that an "autonomous and uniform" Community meaning should be given to "disability". He said disability is tied to the concept of a permanent limitation on activities, and while acknowledging that disability could arise from sickness, sickness was a separate concept that did not mean disability. He found that sickness by itself is not enough to trigger protection under the Directive. This reasoning was adopted by the European Court of Justice (ECJ).

=== European Court of Justice ===
The ECJ started with Article 136 TEC, which states that the Community exists with "a view to lasting high employment and the combating of exclusion." It referred to the mention of disability in the Community Charter of the Fundamental Social Rights of Workers, para 26.

43. “...the concept of “disability” must be understood as referring to a limitation which results in particular from physical, mental or psychological impairments and which hinders the participation of the person concerned in professional life.”

== Significance ==
In the absence of a definition in the Directive, the ECJ used the medical model of disability, which focuses on a person's impairment. The judgement has also been criticised for failing to refer to the social model of disability which had been referred to in European Commission documents underpinning the Directive. One reason for the absence of the judges' opinion of the applicability of the social model is that the ECJ does not publish dissenting views of judges on its bench, but instead must issue a collegiate (i.e. joint) judgment. The ECJ found that a worker who is dismissed only on grounds of sickness is not protected by the prohibition of discrimination on grounds of disability. The judgement has been generally regarded as setting the scene for further judgements relating to the definition of disability, as there is no discussion of Navas' illness having been anything more than a 'sickness' (e.g. not a limitation that amounted to 'disability').

The Framework Directive on Employment did not define 'disability', which given the importance of the Directive and the well known laws in other countries (such as the US's Americans with Disabilities Act) was probably intentional. Some academics saw this as an opening for a wider more social definition of disability. However, this lack of definition left the door wide open to a Court exercising its power to narrow, not expand, the definition.

The ECJ case leaves uncertainty about what sicknesses would result in disability, such as episodic mental illness, or sicknesses that take time to become full-fledged permanent limitations.

The consequences of the case mean that the ECJ has protected employers in their actions against employees who lose capacity due to minor or temporary illnesses, in the case of Spanish law allowing them to make a cost-benefit analysis to pay compensation and rid themselves of an individual. The opposite conclusion in Navas would have meant that employers would have had to backfill the position of Navas until she could return to work. The ECJ's interpretation has limited the definition of disability as well as medicalising it, which stands in contrast to EU policy makers attempts, at some levels, to introduce the social model, which is now entrenched in the Convention on the Rights of Persons with Disabilities.

The ECJ decision, with its inherent uncertainty and reliance on the medical approach, may reinforce the medical model in the EU member states, and perhaps other international jurisdictions, like the US.

Lisa Waddington, Professor and European Disability Forum Chair in European Disability Law, Maastricht University, has suggested that the decision may have helped countries to insert a clear social model definition into the Convention on the Rights of Persons with Disabilities, as the EU representative withdrew their opposition to an explicit social model definition following the publication of the ECJ decision.
