= Akavan Erityisalojen Keskusliitto AEK ry v Fujitsu Siemens Computers Oy =

AEK ry v Fujitsu Siemens Computers Oy
- Court: European Court of Justice
- Citations: (2009) C-44/08, [2009] IRLR 944

Keywords
- Information and consultation

Akavan Erityisalojen Keskusliitto AEK ry v Fujitsu Siemens Computers Oy (2009) C-44/08 is a European labour law case, concerning the information and consultation in the European Union.

== Facts ==
The Dutch giant Fujitsu Siemens Computers (Holding) BV was the parent that owned subsidiary Fujitsu Siemens Computers. It had plants in Finland and Germany. On 14 December 1999, the parent directors proposed to close the Finnish factory of the subsidiary. The subsidiary consulted between 20 December 1999 and 31 January 2000. The decision to close was taken on 1 February 2000, and completed the week after. The workers claimed the decision was taken before consultation began, contrary to the Collective Redundancies Directive 98/59/EC article 2(1) which required an employer to embark upon consultations when ‘contemplating’ collective redundancies and ‘in good time’.

== Judgment ==
The Court of Justice, Fourth Chamber, Judge Lenaerts presiding, rejected that the real decision was taken on 14 December, and that consultations should have been concluded before then. Redundancies being a mere probability were not enough. The obligation does not depend on availability of information, as information would evolve with the process. The obligation to start consulting arises irrespective of who is making the decision, but liability stays with the subsidiary.

45. [The UK submitted that it was important to avoid...] premature triggering of the obligation to hold consultations’ which could mean ‘restricting the flexibility available to undertakings when restructuring, creating heavier administrative burdens and causing unnecessary uncertainty for workers about the safety of their jobs.

[...]

48 It must therefore be held that, in circumstances such as those of the case in the main proceedings, the consultation procedure must be started by the employer once a strategic or commercial decision compelling him to contemplate or to plan for collective redundancies has been taken.

[...]

57 In that regard, it is clear that, under Article 2(1) and (3) and Article 3(1) and (2) of Directive 98/59, the only party on whom the obligations to inform, consult and notify are imposed is the employer, in other words a natural or legal person who stands in an employment relationship with the workers who may be made redundant.

58 An undertaking which controls the employer, even if it can take decisions which are binding on the latter, does not have the status of employer.

59 As stated by the Commission of the European Communities, first, how the management of a group of undertakings is organised is an internal matter and, secondly, it is not the purpose of Directive 98/59, any more than it was of Directive 75/129, to restrict the freedom of such a group to organise their activities in the way which they think best suits their needs (see, to that effect, as regards Directive 75/129, Case C‑449/93 Rockfon [1995] ECR I‑4291, paragraph 21).

[...]

65 ... in the case of a group of undertakings consisting of a parent company and one or more subsidiaries, the obligation to hold consultations with the workers’ representatives falls on the subsidiary which has the status of employer only once that subsidiary, within which collective redundancies may be made, has been identified.

[...]

67 As explained in relation to the answer given to the third and fourth questions, the obligation to hold consultations laid down in Article 2(1) of Directive 98/59 is binding solely on the employer.

68 There is no provision in that directive which can be interpreted to the effect that it may impose such an obligation on the parent company.

69 It follows that it is always for the subsidiary, as the employer, to undertake consultations with the representatives of the workers who may be affected by the collective redundancies contemplated and, if necessary, itself to bear the consequences of failure to fulfil the obligation to hold consultations if it has not been immediately and properly informed of a decision by its parent company making such redundancies necessary.

70 As regards the conclusion of the consultation procedure, the Court has previously ruled that, where Directive 98/59 is applicable, an employment contract can be terminated by the employer only after that procedure is concluded, in other words after the employer has fulfilled the obligations set out in Article 2 of that directive (see Junk, paragraph 45). It follows that the consultation procedure must be completed before any decision on the termination of employees’ contracts is taken.

71 In the context of a group of undertakings such as that in question in the main proceedings, it follows from that case-law that a decision by the parent company which has the direct effect of compelling one of its subsidiaries to terminate the contracts of employees affected by the collective redundancies can be taken only on the conclusion of the consultation procedure within that subsidiary, failing which the subsidiary, as the employer, is liable for the consequences of failure to comply with that procedure.

== See also ==
- UK labour law
- Codetermination
- Confederation of Unions for Professional and Managerial Staff in Finland
