= Equinox initiative for racial justice =

Europe-based racial justice initiative

- Founded: March 2021
- Founders: Sarah Chander, Claire Gilder, Alfiaz Vaiya
- Location: Europe
- Fields: Anti-racism, civil rights
- Website: www.equinox-eu.com

Equinox is a European anti-racism organization, launched in March 2021 with the support of the European Commissioner Helena Dalli. Equinox was co-founded by Alfiaz Vaiya Claire Gilder and Sarah Chander. The Ireland-based human rights activist Bulelani Mfaco is also a member of Equinox.

Representatives of Equinox denounced police violence in the EU towards racialised minorities. Equinox considered that the EU authorities did not sufficiently support civil society organizations combating racism. In March 2021 Equinox put forward a blueprint for reforms recommended to fight structural racism at the EU level.

At the occasion of the 20-year anniversary of EU's Racial Equality Directive, Equinox criticized the legislation for being insufficient to address structural racism, as it is narrowly focused on individual acts of racism.

== European Green Deal ==
An area of focus of Equinox is the European Green Deal. Equinox expressed concerns that the European Green Deal could perpetuate what the group referred to as green colonialism, failing to take into account the perspectives of community of colour within the EU.

== The role of the institutions of the European Union ==
Along with the European Network Against Racism, Equinox denounced the alleged whiteness of the European institutions. The organization argued for a greater representation of racialised communities in the policy discussions at the EU level. Equinox encountered resistance to their antiracism agenda, for example European conservatives have created am moral panic around the concept of critical race theory.

== European Anti-Racism Summit ==
Equinox was one of the civil society organizations represented at the first European Anti-Racism Summit which took place 19 March 2021 co-hosted by the European Commission and the Portuguese Presidency of the Council of the European Union, as part of the EU Anti-racism Action Plan. Together with European Network Against Racism, Equinox advocated for a greater engagement by the European Commission with the civil society representing racialised communities ahead of the summit.
