= EU Anti-racism Action Plan (2020–2025) =

Anti racism efforts in the EU

EU Anti-racism Action Plan is an action plan by the European Union which will be carried out from 2020 through 2025. The plan was announced on 17 June 2020 by president of EU, Ursula von der Leyen, shortly after the murder of George Floyd and massive protests of 2020 across the United States and worldwide. Every year a European Anti-Racism Summit will be held.

EU Anti-racism Action Plan funding is available under Next Generation EU recovery plan.

== Plan ==
The goal of the EU Anti-racism Action Plan is to encourage EU countries to implement national action plans against racism and racial discrimination.

In March 2021, the European Commission established a member state sub-group of experts, which developed the general guidelines necessary to create national action plans against racism and racial discrimination. The guidelines are intended to serve as a framework for Member States to facilitate the process of developing and implementing national action plans. The guidelines were released in March 2022.

== Controversy ==
European Network Against Racism and Equinox reproached the European Commission for insufficient engagement with civil society organizations representing racialised communities before the first European Anti-Racism Summit in 2021.

== Goals ==
- Better enforcement of EU law
- Closer coordination - The European Commission will appoint a coordinator for anti-racism
- Fair policing and protection
- Reinforced action at national level
- Increased diversity of EU staff

== See also ==
- Racial Equality Directive (Directive 2000/43/EC)
- European Commission against Racism and Intolerance (ECRI)
