= Ex parte =

Legal decision or proceeding during which not all parties to the dispute are present

In law, ex parte (/ɛks ˈpɑːrteɪ, -iː/) is a Latin term meaning literally "from/out of the party/faction of" (name of party/faction, often omitted), thus signifying "on behalf of (name)". In common law jurisdictions, an ex parte decision is one decided by a judge without requiring all of the parties to the dispute to be present. Thus, in English law and its derivatives, namely Australian, New Zealand, Canadian, South African, Indian, and U.S. legal doctrines, ex parte means a legal proceeding brought by one party in the absence of and without representation of or notification to the other party. In civil law countries, this would be called an inaudita (altera) parte proceeding, whereas ex parte simply refers to proceedings (or aspects of proceedings, such as expert testimony entered into evidence) submitted by or decided at the request of one of the parties, without implying the absence of other parties.

The term is also used more loosely to refer to improper unilateral contacts with a court, arbitrator, or represented party without notice to the other party or counsel for that party. The phrase was common in the titles of habeas corpus and judicial review cases until the end of the twentieth century, because those cases were originally brought by the Crown on behalf of the claimant. In Commonwealth common law jurisdictions, the title typically appeared as R v Defendant, ex parte Claimant; in the US, this was shortened to Ex parte Claimant, while in the UK it has been Anglicised to R (on the application of Claimant) v Defendant. A proceeding in an executive agency to establish a right, such as patent prosecution, can also be ex parte.

== Australia ==
In Australian law ex parte is used in two senses. The predominant use is to refer to an ex parte hearing, being one which is heard in the absence of one or more parties. Where proceedings are heard ex parte, a high degree of candour is required, including full and fair disclosure of facts adverse to the moving party. A failure to make such disclosure is ordinarily sufficient to warrant discharge of such order as might be made.

The other use means 'on the application of' when used in the case name where prerogative relief is sought, such as a writ of prohibition, certiorari or mandamus. Thus for example the case name in the Boilermakers' case is R v Kirby; Ex parte Boilermakers' Society of Australia as the case concerned a writ of prohibition that was sought against Kirby, Dunphy and Ashburner, who were judges of the Commonwealth Court of Conciliation and Arbitration, on the application of the Boilermakers Society of Australia. While the case name is 'ex parte' it was not heard in the absence of a party, with the judges being represented by D I Menzies QC who also represented the Commonwealth Attorney-General. Similarly the case of Re Wakim; Ex parte McNally concerned application of McNally for a writ of prohibition in relation to proceedings in the Federal Court that were commenced by Wakim. Both McNally and Wakim appeared in the High Court. There was however no appearance for the first respondents in the bankruptcy cases, the judges of the Federal Court.

== United States ==
In the United States, the availability of ex parte orders or decrees from both federal and state courts is sharply limited by the Fifth and Fourteenth Amendments, which provide that a person shall not be deprived of any interest in liberty or property without due process of law. In practice this has been interpreted to require adequate notice of the request for judicial relief and an opportunity to be heard concerning the merits of such relief. A court order issued on the basis of an ex parte proceeding, therefore, will necessarily be de bene esse (temporary and interim in nature), and the person(s) affected by the order must be given an opportunity to contest the appropriateness of the order before it can be made permanent.

There are exceptions to this. The secret Foreign Intelligence Surveillance Court, which grants the National Security Agency permission to perform certain types of electronic surveillance, operates on a permanent ex parte basis. Parties other than the government are not normally permitted to argue in front of the court, though it is possible for the recipients of court orders to challenge them in other ways. This is as directed by statute. Most US states also allow for initial hearings regarding civil protection orders to be done ex parte; however, a second hearing is usually set a short time later to allow the alleged abuser to answer for the allegations. An article about such restraining orders, authored by Debra Stark and Jessica Choplin, indicated this concept in its title, "Seeing the Wrecking Ball in Motion: Ex Parte Protection Orders and the Realities of Domestic Violence". The idea is that ex parte orders must be used in a "wrecking ball" type of situation, where giving advance notice to a respondent would allow him or her to cause irreversible damage before the notice takes effect. Stark and Choplin argued that such damage would be possible if ex parte orders were not used for restraining orders, and that the very fact of an order being issued might increase the chance of the respondent causing damage.

The phrase has also traditionally been used in the captions of petitions for the writ of habeas corpus, which were (and in some jurisdictions, still are) styled as "Ex parte Doe," where Doe was the name of the petitioner who was alleged to be wrongfully held. As the Supreme Court's description of nineteenth century practice in Ex parte Milligan shows, however, such proceedings were not ex parte in any significant sense. The prisoner's ex parte application sought only an order requiring the person holding the prisoner to appear before the court to justify the prisoner's detention; no order requiring the freeing of a prisoner could be given until after the jailer was given the opportunity to contest the prisoner's claims at a hearing on the merits.

=== State trial courts ===
State courts vary in their use of ex parte proceedings (for example, in custody cases, replevin cases and other civil matters), though most have it in one form or another. For example, in the States of California and Illinois, ex parte proceedings are available if notice is given before 10 a.m. the previous court day, or even shorter upon showing of emergency need. As most courts in these two states hold law and motion hearings in the early morning, this notice is typically confirmed by facsimile although oral notice may be effective. Some courts in California have procedures to allow opponents to appear telephonically, while other courts do not allow any oral argument and only consider written papers. In California, the party who files an ex parte application must file a declaration showing compliance with these requirements, and no relief may be granted absent such declaration. In addition to the notice requirements, an ex parte application must contain an affirmative actual showing in a declaration based on personal knowledge of "irreparable harm, immediate danger, or any other statutory basis for granting relief ex parte".

== United Kingdom ==
Before the Woolf Reforms, judicial reviews in England were cited Regina v [The Public Body] ex parte [Person], where the person was the one actually bringing the case. The 'Regina' (or Rex if the monarch is a male) refers to the sovereign in whose name all judicial reviews are brought. This derives from the petition for writs, which were in the name of the Crown. Since the reforms, cases are now named Rex (on the application of [Person]) v [The Public Body].

== See also ==
- Ex parte Endo
- Ex parte Merryman
- Ex parte Milligan
- Ex parte Quirin
- Inter partes
- Temporary injunction
- R v Bow Street Metropolitan Stipendiary Magistrate, ex parte Pinochet
- R v Burgess; Ex parte Henry
- R v Commonwealth Court of Conciliation and Arbitration; Ex parte BHP
- R v Department of Trade and Industry, ex parte Broadcasting, Entertainment, Cinematographic and Theatre Union
- R. v. North and East Devon Health Authority, ex parte Coughlan
