= Nimz v Freie und Hansestadt Hamburg =

1991 European labour law case

- Court: European Court of Justice
- Citations: (1991) C-184/89, [1991] ECR I-297

Keywords
- Objective justification

Nimz v Freie und Hansestadt Hamburg (1991) C-184/89 is an EU labour law case, which held that a justification that part-time employees could be paid less, since full-time employees could acquire skills quicker, was doubtful.

== Facts ==
Helga Nimz worked part-time (under three quarters of full-time). She was paid less. The town council argued that full-time employees acquire ability and skill faster and should therefore be paid more.

== Judgment ==
ECJ held that it was unlikely that the justifications offered by the Hamburg council could be valid.

14. It should, however, be stated that such considerations, in so far as they are no more than generalizations about certain categories of workers, do not make it possible to identify criteria which are both objective and unrelated to any discrimination on grounds of sex (see the judgment of 13 July 1989 in Case 171/88 Rinner-Kuehn v FWW Spezial-Gebaeudereinigung [1989] ECR 2743). Although experience goes hand in hand with length of service, and experience enables the worker in principle to improve performance of the tasks allotted to him, the objectivity of such a criterion depends on all the circumstances in a particular case, and in particular on the relationship between the nature of the work performed and the experience gained from the performance of that work upon completion of a certain number of working hours. However, it is a matter for the national court, which alone is competent to evaluate the facts, to determine in the light of all the circumstances whether and to what extent a provision in a collective agreement such as that here at issue is based on objectively justified factors unrelated to any discrimination on grounds of sex.
