= Horsey v Dyfed CC =

Horsey v Dyfed County Council
- Court: Employment Appeal Tribunal
- Citation: [1982] IRLR 395

Court membership
- Judge sitting: Browne-Wilkinson J

Keywords
- Discrimination, stereotyping

Horsey v Dyfed County Council [1982] IRLR 395 is a UK labour law case, concerning the test for causation of discrimination.

== Facts ==
Mrs Horsey was a Trainee Social Worker with Dyfed County Council, living in Aberystwyth. She successfully applied for a secondment to do a social work course in Maidstone and was accepted on this course. Her husband subsequently got a job in London so he could live with her whilst she completed the two-year course. Her employer then withdrew permission and funding for the course, as was found, because the employer thought she would probably not return. This was found to be on the basis of a ‘generalised assumption that married women follow their husband’s jobs.’

== Judgment ==
Browne Wilkinson J held that Mrs Horsey had been discriminated against through this stereotyping. He said the words ‘on the grounds of’ in the SDA 1975 cover ‘cases where the alleged discriminator acts on generalised assumptions as to the characteristics of women or married or coloured persons’ and not just where ‘the sole factor influencing the decision of the alleged discriminator is the sex, marital status or race of the complainant’.

== See also ==
- UK labour law
- EU labour law
