= Employment Information Directive 1991 =

The Employment Information Directive 1991 (91/533/EEC) of 14 October 1991, also known as the "Written Statement Directive", or the "Employment Information Directive" was an EU Directive which regulates European labour law for the purpose of making workers' contracts transparent. It has been superseded by the Employment Information Directive 2019.

The Directive requires EU governments to introduce legislation which gives employees within their jurisdiction the right to be notified in writing of the essential aspects of their employment relationship when it starts or shortly afterwards. Some Member States (but not all) require the conclusion of a detailed written employment contract. According to the European Commission, "the aim of Directive 91/533/EEC is to provide employees with improved protection, to avoid uncertainty and insecurity about the terms of the employment relationship and to create greater transparency on the labour market. To this end, the Directive states that every employee must be provided with a document containing information on the essential elements of [their] contract or employment relationship. Coverage is variable because it is linked to the definition of an employment contract or employment relationship adopted by the relevant member state, and member states could choose to exclude short term contracts (less than on month), short working weeks (less than eight hours per week) and casual labour from the scope of their implementing regulations.

== Content ==
- Art 1(2) member states can disapply the Directive for people (a) working under one month or with a working week under eight hours, or (b) with jobs ‘of a casual and/or specific nature’ if this is justified by objective considerations.
- Art 2(1) obligation to notify an employee ‘of the essential aspects of the contract or employment relationship’. (2) this covers at least (a) identity of parties (b) place of work or employer's domicile (c) title, grade, category or nature of work, or a brief description of the work (d) commencement date (e) for temporary contracts, expected duration (f) paid leave (g) periods of notice or method for determining (h) initial pay (i) working time (j) where appropriate, the collective agreement or joint representation institutions. (3) leave, notice, pay and time can be given in the form of laws, regulations or collective agreements.
- Art 3(1) the information can be in a written contract, letter of engagement or one or more written documents (2) if none of those given in the prescribed period, employer is obliged to give the art 2(2) information in two months (3) if the work ends in two months the information must be given by the end of the period
- Art 4, expatriate employees need to be told the duration of their employment abroad (unless one month or less), currency, other benefits, and conditions for repatriation
- Art 5, modification must be made in writing available at least one month after
- Art 6, form and proof of contracts are a matter of national law, which is not affected.
- Art 7, more favourable provisions can be made
- Art 8, employees must have a remedy available in their member state
- Art 9, implementation by 30 June 1993

== Review of Directive ==
An evaluation of the directive was undertaken in 2016.

An alternative directive on "Transparent and Predictable Working Conditions" has been proposed. This will, if adopted, replace Directive 91/533/EEC, but until its adoption and entry into force, Directive 91/533/EEC remains applicable.

== See also ==
- UK labour law
- European labour law
- Employment Information Directive 2019.
