= Wolf v Stadt Frankfurt am Main =

Decision of the European Court of Justice

- Court: European Court of Justice
- Citation: (2010) C-229/08, [2010] IRLR 244

Keywords
- Age, discrimination, genuine occupational requirement

Wolf v Stadt Frankfurt am Main (2010) C-229/08 is a European labour law case, concerning age discrimination.

== Facts ==
People being recruited to the fire service went through a rigorous fitness test. Very few officers were aged over 45 and none were over 50 years old. The fire service had an age limit of joining the fire service set at 30 years old. It argued this was a genuine occupational requirement, for the purpose of ensuring fitness. Therefore, it was not unlawful age discrimination.

== Judgment ==
The ECJ held that an age limit of 30 for joining the fire service was a genuine occupational requirement, to ensure the fitness of the people being recruited.

== See also ==
- UK labour law
