= Lyttle v Bluebird UK Bidco 2 Ltd =

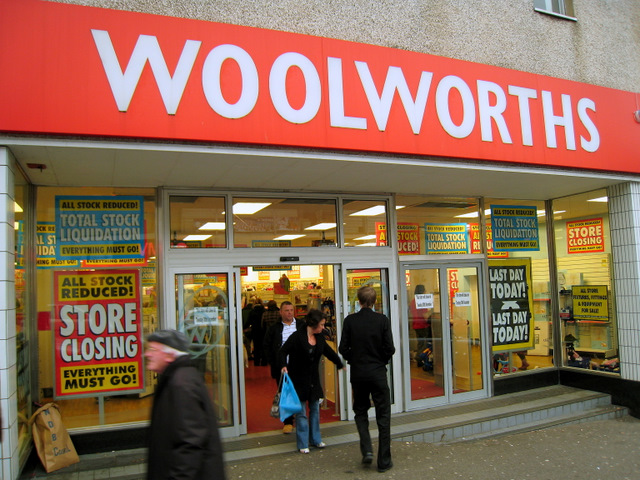
- Court: European Court of Justice
- Citation: (2015) C-182/13

Case history
- Prior action: [2013] NIIT 00555_12IT

Keywords
- Information and consultation

Lyttle v Bluebird UK Bidco 2 Ltd(2015) C-182/13 is a UK labour law case, concerning the information and consultation in the European Union.

== Facts ==
Employees of Bluebird Ltd, working at Woolworths shops, were dismissed. They claimed there was a failure to consult under CRD 1998 article (1)(a)(ii). Each shop had under 20 employees, and in none were more than 20 dismissed, which would trigger the duty to consult under the Trade Union and Labour Relations (Consolidation) Act 1992 section 188. The employees, represented by the union USDAW, argued the shops should collectively be deemed one establishment, so as to trigger the duty to consult.

The Northern Ireland Industrial Tribunal held a reference should be made to the European Court of Justice.

== Judgment ==
The Court of Justice, Fifth Chamber held that an establishment was part of an undertaking, and did not need any legal, economic, financial, administrative of technological autonomy. It would be the entity to which workers were assigned to carry out duties under art 1(1)(a), since Athinaiki Chartopoiia AE v Panagiotidis (2007) C-270/05. The term should be interpreted the same under art 1(1)(a)(i) and (ii).

51. In the present case, on the basis of the information available to the Court set out at [16] above, it appears that each of the stores at issue in the main proceedings is a distinct entity that is ordinarily permanent, entrusted with performing specified tasks, namely primarily the sale of goods, and which has, to that end, several workers, technical means and an organisational structure in that the store is an individual cost centre managed by a manager. 52. Accordingly, such a store is capable of satisfying the criteria set out in the case law cited at [28], [30] and [32] above relating to the term “establishment” in art.1(1)(a) of Directive 98/59; this is, however, a matter for the referring tribunal to establish in the light of the specific circumstances of the dispute in the main proceedings.

== See also ==
- UK labour law
- Codetermination
