= MacCartney v Oversley House Management =

- Court: Employment Appeal Tribunal
- Decided: 31 January 2006
- Citation: [2006] IRLR 514 (EAT)

Keywords
- Minimum wage

MacCartney v Oversley House Management [2006] IRLR 514 (EAT) is a UK labour law case regarding the National Minimum Wage Act 1998.

== Facts ==
McCartney was a resident manager at Oversley House, which was originally built as the Alcester Poor Law Union workhouse in 1834. She needed to be within three miles of the residential home and be contactable by mobile phone. She had to respond to emergencies 24 hours a day, four days a week, in her contract. She got £8,750 pa, paid monthly, with rent-free accommodation. She claimed that she had been denied proper periods of rest and rest breaks under WTR 1998 rr 10(1) and 12(1). She said she had ‘salaried hours work’ under r 4(1) and that all time on call was working time, so she was getting less than the minimum wage.

The Tribunal found she was not ‘working’ while on call because she could take rest, and so dismissed her claim. As for the minimum wage, she was said to have ‘unmeasured work’ and not salaried work, so her whole shift was not working time. She therefore got over the minimum for her 40-hour week. Mrs MacCartney appealed.

== Judgment ==
Richardson J overturned the Tribunal and held that she was employed on salary work within NMWR 1999 r 4 for the whole period, even though much was spent at home and for part of it she was asleep. Under WTR 1998 r 12(1), she was entitled to an uninterrupted rest break of 20 minutes. She worked more than six hours a day, but the kind of work did not allow for uninterruption. WTR 1998 regulation 2(1)(a) defined working time to include a worker not actually doing anything, but required to be present and remain available at a place determined by an employer. So the whole period on call, within short distance of her home was working time. So she could get daily rest period under r 10(1). Under the NMWR 1999 r 4, she had ‘salaried hours work’. So she was not paid the minimum wage.

== See also ==
- UK labour law
