= Road Transport Regulation 2006 =

European Union regulation

The Road Transport Regulation (EC) No. 561/2006 is an EU regulation that sets health and safety standards for workers who drive within the EU.

== Contents ==
Article 6 requires that daily driving time is 9 hours maximum, but 10 hours max twice a week, (2) the weekly max 56 hours, (3) the two week max 90 hours, and (4) this includes in non-EU countries. Article 7 requires that after 4 1/2 hours, drives take a 45-minute break, or 15 minutes plus 30 minutes within that period. Article 8 sets weekly rest periods of at least two in two weeks, and one of at least 24 hours.

Article 10 states that there may be no payments by transport undertakings to drivers ‘related to distances travelled and/or the amount of goods carried if that payment is of such a kind as to endanger road safety and/or encourages infringement of this Regulation.’

Article 11 says that member state can have longer minimum breaks.

Article 13 contains various exceptions, and article 26 has final provisions.

== See also ==
- EU law
- European labour law
- UK enterprise law
