= London Underground Ltd v Edwards (No 2) =

- Court: Employment Appeal Tribunal

London Underground Ltd v Edwards (No 2) [1997] IRLR 157 is a leading discrimination case relevant for UK labour law, concerning objective justification of indirect discrimination.

== Facts ==
Ms Edwards, a single parent, could not keep up child care after the Underground altered its shift system. She had worked as a train driver for ten years.

The Tribunal held that they could have ‘easily, without losing the objectives of their plan and reorganisation, accommodated the applicant who was a long-serving employee… They did not address themselves to these issues’

== Judgment ==
Morison J dismissed the employer's appeal. ‘It may be that London Underground would have wished to implement the single parent link but gave in to pressure from their predominantly male workforce.’ First, he said, ‘the more clear it is that the employers unreasonably failed to show flexibility in their employment practices, the more willing the tribunal should be to make a finding of unlawful discrimination.’ Second, employers can change rosters, but ‘should carefully consider the impact which a new roster might have on a section of their workforce.’ Third, nothing said here ‘should be construed as favouring positive discrimination.’

== See also ==
- UK labour law
- EU labour law
