= Platform Work Directive 2024 =

Proposed European Union directive

The Platform Work Directive 2024 (EU) 2024/2831 is a proposed European Union Directive on the regulation of platform work in EU law.

== Contents ==
Article 1 sets out the Directive's purpose to improve work, ensure "correct determination of [platform workers'] employment status" and promote fairness, transparency and accountability in algorithmic management in platform work, and support sustainable growth in digital labour platforms. Under (2) the Directive applies to everyone with an employment contract or relationship, and article 10 also applies to those who do not, and (3) it applies wherever the platform is established.

Article 2 sets out definitions of (1) 'digital labour platform' as a commercial service at a distance by electronic means at the request of a recipient, with an essential component of organising work, but does not include share asset platforms (2) platform work means work organised by contract (3) person performing platform work is irrespective of the contract (4) platform worker is someone with an employment contract or relationship, (5) representatives are worker representatives and (6) micro, or small or medium size enterprises follows the Commission Recommendation 2003/361/EC, namely employing under 250 persons, turnover under €50 million, or balance sheet totalling under €43 million.

Article 3 requires member states to have procedures to correctly determine employment status of someone on a platform, "guided primarily by facts relating to the actual performance of work, taking into account the use of algorithms in the organisation of platform work, irrespective of how the relationship is classified in any contractual arrangement that may have been agreed between the parties involved."

Article 4 says that employment status is to be determined by law and collective agreements, not contracts:

1. Member States shall have appropriate and effective procedures in place to verify and ensure the determination of the correct employment status of persons performing platform work, with a view to ascertaining the existence of an employment relationship as defined by the law, collective agreements or practice in force in the Member States, with consideration to the case-law of the Court of Justice, including through the application of the legal presumption of an employment relationship pursuant to Article 5.
2. The ascertainment of the existence of an employment relationship shall be guided primarily by the facts relating to the actual performance of work, including the use of automated monitoring systems or automated decision-making systems in the organisation of platform work, irrespective of how the relationship is designated in any contractual arrangement that may have been agreed between the parties involved.

Article 5 sets a legal presumption that a contractual relationship between a platform controlling performance of work and a person performing work is an employment relationship. It then enables the presumption to be rebutted, but it has the burden of proof and this does not suspend the legal presumption, and has a duty to assist the court with relevant information.

=== Chapter III Algorithmic management ===
Article 6 requires (1) platforms to inform workers of (a) automated monitoring systems and (b) automated decision-making systems that significantly affect work conditions. (2) Information must be detailed (3) in a document (4) available for worker representatives and government authorities. Also (5) platforms must not process data not strictly necessary for performance of the contract, such as personal, emotional or psychological data, health data, private conversations including with worker representatives, or collect data while the platform worker is not working.

Article 7 requires human monitoring of automated systems, including the impact on health and safety.

Article 8 requires human review of significant decisions, including a right to an explanation of any decision from an automated system, and reasons for restricting access to an account. There is a right to review decisions.

Article 9 requires information and consultation in accordance with the Information and Consultation of Employees Directive 2002, and platforms with over 500 workers must pay for an expert to assist workers.

Article 10 requires that articles 6, 7(1) and (3) and 8 also apply to non-employees of platforms.

=== Chapter IV Transparency ===
Article 11 requires platforms to make declarations that they are platforms to relevant authorities.

Article 12 requires platforms inform authorities of the number of people on platforms and conditions of work, including contracts, each 6 months.

=== Chapter V Enforcement ===
Article 13 requires everyone on a platform has adequate redress and dispute resolution for violation of rights.

Article 14 requires procedures to support people doing platform work, including those with "a legitimate interest in defending the rights of persons performing platform work", such as trade unions.

Article 15 requires that member states ensure people doing platform work can contact and communicate with each other, while complying with the General Data Protection Regulation (EU) 2016/679, and the platform must refrain from accessing or monitoring these contacts or communications.

Article 16 requires people doing platform work can make a platform release evidence under their control, if needed by court order.

Articles 17 to 18 protect people from any adverse treatment or dismissal for exercising rights under the Directive, that they can request reasons for dismissal, and the burden of proof lies on the platform.

Article 19 requires supervision and penalties for breach.

Articles 20 to 24 are final provisions on the Directive setting minimum standards, being implemented, and reviewed.

== See also ==
- UK labour law
- European labour law
