= R v Department of Trade and Industry, ex parte Broadcasting, Entertainment, Cinematographic and Theatre Union =

R (BECTU) v DTI
- Court: European Court of Justice
- Full case name: R v Department of Trade and Industry, ex parte Broadcasting, Entertainment, Cinematographic and Theatre Union
- Decided: 26 June 2001
- Citations: (2001) C-173/99, [2001] 3 CMLR 7

Keywords
- Working Time Directive

R v Department of Trade and Industry, ex parte Broadcasting, Entertainment, Cinematographic and Theatre Union (2001) C-173/99 is a European labour law and UK labour law case concerning the Working Time Directive, which is relevant for the Working Time Regulations 1998.

== Facts ==
The original Working Time Regulations 1998 provided for a 13-week qualifying period at work before one could benefit from its protection. This restriction was challenged by the Broadcasting, Entertainment, Cinematograph and Theatre Union, because there was nothing about it in the Directive.

== Judgment ==
The European Court of Justice said the Directive's purpose from recitals 1, 4, 7 and 8 and Art 1(1) is ‘to improve the living and working conditions of workers’. Recital 4 refers to the Community Charter of the Fundamental Social Rights of Workers point 8 and 19(1) that everyone should have satisfactory health and safety at work. It is clear that member states may be more favourable, but Art 7 does not say that member states can be less favourable or allow derogations. It observed that ‘National rules of that kind are also manifestly incompatible with the scheme of Directive 93/104... Furthermore, rules of the kind at issue… are liable to give rise to abuse because employers might be tempted to evade the obligation to grant the paid annual leave to which every worker is entitled by more frequent resort to short-term employment relationships.’ Accordingly, introducing a qualifying period was not allowed.

== See also ==
- UK labour law
- Working Time Directive
