= European Network Against Racism =

Network of European anti-racism NGOs

- Type: Non-governmental organization
- Purpose: Anti-racism, civil rights
- Headquarters: European Union
- Region served: European Union, Iceland
- Website: www.enar-eu.org

The European Network Against Racism (ENAR) is an EU-wide network of anti-racist NGOs. ENAR aims to end structural racism and discrimination and advocates for equality and solidarity for all Europeans. It connects local and national anti-racist NGOs throughout Europe and acts as an interface between its +140 members and European institutions. It voices the concerns of ethnic and religious minorities in both European and national policy debates.

ENAR is funded by the Open Society Foundations, the European AI & Society Fund, and Porticus.

== History ==
ENAR is was created as a result of the 1997 European Year Against Racism. Between March and September 1998, more than 600 NGOs were involved in national and European round table consultations to discuss the viability of such a structure. Along with Equinox, ENAR has been denouncing the whiteness of the European institutions and argued for a greater representation or racialised communities in the policy discussions at the EU level.

== Controversy ==
=== Links with the Muslim Brotherhood ===
ENAR has been linked to the Muslim Brotherhood by MEP Frederique Ries, a claim also extended to its member organisation FEMYSO. Michaël Privot, ENAR's former director, publicly admitted he had joined and then left the Muslim Brotherhood.

=== Funding ===
In July 2026, the European Network Against Racism (ENAR), Europe’s largest pan-European anti-racism network representing over 140 organizations, was formally notified that the European Commission’s European Education and Culture Executive Agency (EACEA) had rejected its proposal for a 2026–2028 Framework Partnership Agreement, effectively cutting off its structural operating funding under the EU’s Citizens, Equality, Rights and Values (CERV) programme. The decision followed more than ten months of administrative reviews and requests for documentation concerning ENAR’s governance and operational capacity. ENAR disputes the assessment and is challenging the decision before the General Court of the European Union. Having relied on its financial reserves since January 2026, the organization warned that it may be forced to cease operations by the end of the year unless funding is restored or alternative financial support is secured, potentially affecting its advocacy activities and support for grassroots anti-racism organizations across Europe.

Following the funding withdrawal, a broad coalition of civil society organizations, mobilized in defense of the network. On 6 October 2026, more than 185 human rights and non-governmental organizations across Europe, including Human Rights Watch, Amnesty International, the International Federation for Human Rights (FIDH), and the European Civic Forum, issued a joint statement expressing concern over the European Commission’s decision. The signatories warned that terminating ENAR’s operating grant after over 20 years of partnership severely undermines the EU’s democracy and equality agendas, while further eroding civic space and civil society autonomy across the continent. Emphasizing ENAR’s crucial role in historic milestones such as the Race Equality Directive and the EU Anti-Racism Action Plan, the coalition called for renewed institutional support and urged the public to back the network’s emergency fundraising campaign to prevent its shutdown.

== Members ==
ENAR members include a wide range of organisations, from grassroots to advocacy organisations, from information centres, to trade unions, to faith-based organisations.
