= DPP v McLoughlin =

Irish Supreme Court case

- Coat of arms of Ireland
- Court: Supreme Court of Ireland
- Full case name: DPP v McLoughlin
- Decided: 31/07/2009
- Citation: [2009] IESC 65

Court membership
- Judges sitting: Denham J., Hardiman J., Geoghegan J.

Case opinions
- Decision by: Denham J.

DPP v McLoughlin, [2009] IESC 65, was an Irish Supreme Court case, which confirmed that when objecting to the granting of bail where alleged witness intimidation is raised, the judge in the application should explicitly address the likelihood, extent, and impact of intimidation. This case specifically raised the issue of hearsay in considering potential witness intimidation and in the context of a bail decision. The decision of Denham J, goes on to state in regards to hearsay that: "The relevance and weight of such evidence is a matter to be determined by the trial judge and that a judge should be careful on the weight he or she places on such evidence". The case also had implications for bail applications because the Supreme Court found that a high case load for the High Court had implications on bail decisions.

== Background ==
On 26 November 2008, Tristan McLoughlin was charged with assault causing harm contrary to Section .3 of the Non-Fatal Offences Against the Person Act 1997 and was remanded in custody. It is alleged that the assault occurred in a pub in Naas where due to the attack, the victim received 100 stitches over a period of four hours. The parties involved knew each other. His Brother had also been charged in relation to the same incident and was instead charged with common assault and was awaiting his sentencing.

In the High Court, the prosecution objected to bail. This objection was on the basis that there was an alleged risk of witnesses' being interfered with as reported by Detective Inspector Hanrahan. As they had allegedly been intimidated in such a manner prior to the trial of the Appellant's brother. Where the injured party withdrew their statement due to this intimidation. One prosecution witness, for example, had their tyres slashed prior to the brothers case. There was an objection to the hearsay evidence and the case was adjourned until 25 May 2009. When the court re-adjourned, the counsel for the Director told witnesses claiming to have been intimidated were not in Court. The trial judge allowed the evidence to proceed, de bene esse.

On cross examination, Detective Inspector Hanrahan suggested that no witness was in court because they feared for their safety. This cross examination was a key part of the trial because it directly connected witness intimidation to the bail application.

A number of Gardaí gave evidence about intimidation. The judge stated that hearsay evidence was allowable in this case due to the circumstances and further ruled that the defendant should be refused bail.

== Holding of the Supreme Court ==
The Appeal was allowed by the Supreme Court Judges and was remitted to the High Court. With regard to the issue of hearsay in bail applications, the justices allowed the hearsay evidence in the McLoughlin case and declared that its important was for the trial judge to decide. They did, however, caution about the level of importance placed should be placed on it. Hardiman J, his opinion in accordance with DPP v. McGinley [1998] 2 IR 408 stating that, the hearsay rule can lead to injustice if applied in a "rigid and unyielding manner" and for this reason, numerous exceptions have been grafted on to the general exclusionary rule.

It was decided by the Supreme Court, regarding hearsay that:

The test is not whether the members of An Garda Síochána have fears or an apprehension for witnesses. The court itself should be satisfied of the probability of the risk of interference or intimidation and make that finding expressly”. In this particular case, it was noted by Hardiman J. that the evidence given by Gardaí regarding the information from the unknown source was hearsay evidence as it "implied the truth of assertions made by an unknown person whose credibility and general integrity as a witness could not be tested by cross-examination.

Justice Keane stated in the ruling in the McGinley case that:

Where there is evidence which indicates as a matter of probability that the applicant, if granted bail, will not stand his trial or will interfere with witnesses, the right to liberty must yield to the public interest in the administration of justice. It is in that context that hearsay evidence may become admissible, where the court hearing the application is satisfied that there are sufficient grounds for not requiring the witnesses to give viva voce evidence. This was referenced in Justice Denham's opinion, In The McLoughlin case, no direct viva voce evidence was given by witnesses of intimidation, meaning that these witnesses could not be cross examined. In the words of Hardiman J, "the admission of hearsay evidence effectively stymies cross-examination because; one cannot hope to shake a witness who can repeat that they are only saying what they were told, these difficulties are compounded by the lack of opportunity on the part of the court to observe the demeanour of the hearsay declarant under cross-examination.

Overall, in the McLoughlin case the admissibility of the hearsay evidence in this case was allowed but it was reiterated that this was an exception to the rule, "The result of this is that hearsay evidence may be admissible in a bail application, but quite exceptionally, and when a specific, recognised, ground for its admission has been properly established by ordinary evidence".
