= James v Eastleigh BC =

UK legal case

- Court: House of Lords
- Citation: [1990] 2 AC 751

James v Eastleigh Borough Council [1990] 2 AC 751 is a leading discrimination case relevant for UK labour law, concerning the test for discrimination. It rejected that motive was in any way a part of the test for discrimination. This precludes the legality of positive discrimination, or any other kind of discrimination which may involve a benign motive.

== Facts ==
Eastleigh BC offered free swimming pool access to pensioners, while non-pensioners had to pay for access. Because men and women become pensioners at different ages, "pensionable age" was "a shorthand expression which refers to the age of 60 in a woman and to the age of 65 in a man". Mr James had to pay for the swimming pool, but Mrs James did not because he was below pensionable age. He claimed there was direct discrimination (not indirect, whereby there would probably be a successful justification). Mr James claimed that this was contrary to the Sex Discrimination Act 1975 section 29.

== Judgment ==
Lord Bridge, Lord Ackner and Lord Goff held that this was discrimination on grounds of sex under SDA 1975 s 1(1), because it followed the state pensionable and that was itself discriminatory. Lord Goff that Sir Nicholas Browne-Wilkinson VC’s desire test was not appropriate. One need not focus at all on intention or motive, because one can simply ask, ‘would the complainant have received the same treatment from the defendant but for his or her sex?’

I have to stress, however, that the ‘but for’ test is not appropriate for cases of indirect discrimination under s 1(1)(b), because there may be indirect discrimination against persons of one sex under that subsection, although a (proportionately smaller) group of persons of the opposite sex is adversely affected in the same way.

Lord Griffiths and Lord Lowry dissented.

== See also ==
- UK labour law
- EU labour law
