= Erzberger v TUI AG =

- Court: Court of Justice of the European Union
- Citation: (2017) C-566/15

Keywords
- Free movement of workers

Erzberger v TUI AG (2017) C-566/15 is an EU law and European labour law case, concerning the scope of free movement of workers, in relation to codetermination.

== Facts ==
Erzberger, a shareholder in TUI AG, a travel company, claimed its structure violated the free movement of workers provisions in the TFEU by following German law's minimum requirement for workers to vote for its supervisory board. The German Codetermination Act 1976 (Mitbestimmungsgesetz 1976) §1 requires workers in Germany, but not necessarily those working in other countries, have the right to vote for the supervisory board. Erzberger argued the ‘supervisory board should have been composed only of members designated by the company’s shareholders.’ Erzberger argued the Codetermination Act 1976 violated EU law by not enabling non-German workers to vote, on the theory that people would be deterred from moving from one member state to another within a country if they might lose voting rights. He argued this violated TFEU article 18, on non-discrimination, and article 45 on free movement.

== Judgment ==
The Court of Justice held that codetermination rules are not an ‘impediment to free movement of workers’ in the European Union. TFEU article 18 was irrelevant because article 45 was the more specific rule, but article 45 was not engaged at all. Workers who worked abroad would have no factor linking them to ‘any of the situations governed by EU law’ (at [28]). Furthermore, territorial limits to rights are ‘objective and non-discriminatory’ ([38]).

== See also ==
- European labour law
- EU law
