= Kücükdeveci v Swedex GmbH & Co KG =

European Court of Justice case about age discrimination and equal treatment in employment

- Court: European Court of Justice
- Citations: (2010) C-555/07, [2010] IRLR 346

Kücükdeveci v Swedex GmbH & Co KG (2010) C-555/07 is a leading EU labour law case, which held that there is a general principle of law in all European Union member states, against discrimination, and in favour of equal treatment.

== Facts ==
Ms Kücükdeveci argued that the German service-related statutory minimum notice period, because it disregarded employment before the age of 25, was unjustifiably discriminatory against young people. She had started work at age 18 for Swedex, and was dismissed in 2006 after ten years of service. She argued that under the German Civil Code, BGB §622 (enacted in 1926, [34]), the fact that she received only one month's notice was discriminatory: she should have had four months, were it not for the under-25 exception.

After the Landesarbeitsgericht Düsseldorf referred the question, the government argued that the aim was to give employers more flexibility by allowing them to dismiss young workers, who could be expected to be more personally and occupationally mobile. The questions were: (1)(a) is an age qualification for provisions on reasonable notice discriminatory; (b) are they justified; and (2) if unjustifiable, do private citizens have a direct right of action against employers?

== Judgment ==
The European Court of Justice (Grand Chamber) held that the legislation was contrary to the Employment Equality Framework Directive 2000/78/EC, but also following Mangold v Helm a general principle of equality which permeates all of EU law, to which the Directive merely gave expression. This is more so because the Charter of Fundamental Rights article 21(1) says the same and that has the same legal value as the treaties under TEU art 6(1). Accordingly, in paragraphs [23]-[31], it was held that the legislation in BGB §622 was discriminatory. There was not a sufficient objective justification for the measure, because although the German government's professed aim of wishing to bolster youth employment was legitimate, its measure was disproportionate.

In paragraphs [44]-[56] the ECJ further held that national courts have a duty to disapply any provision of national legislation contrary to the principle of equal treatment. They should not be compelled to make a reference to the ECJ first. The EU law can only be applied when there is a cross-border issue.
