= Sindicato de Médicos de Asistencia Pública v Conselleria de Sanidad y Consumo de la Generalidad Valenciana =

Labour law case

SIMAP v CSCGV
- Court: European Court of Justice
- Citations: (2000) C-303/98, [2000] ECR I-7963

Keywords
- Working Time Directive

Sindicato de Medicos de Asistencia Publica v Conselleria de Sanidad y Consumo de la Generalidad Valenciana (2000) C-303/98 is a European labour law case concerning the Working Time Directive, which is relevant for the Working Time Regulations 1998.

== Facts ==
The Spanish legislation that implemented the Working Time Directive applied only to private sector workers. The question was if Spanish doctors in the Sindicato de Médicos de Asistencia Pública were engaged in public sector work described as in regulation 18(2)(a) (now updated through Article 17), which gave examples of the armed forces and police.

== Judgment ==
The European Court of Justice held that health care workers could not be ‘assimilated to such activities’ to fall within the exception for essential public sector workers like the armed forces. According to the general principles of construction, ‘it is clear both from the object of the basic Directive, namely to encourage improvement in the safety and health of workers at work, and from the wording of Article 2(1) thereof, that it must necessarily be broad in scope. It follows that the exceptions to the scope of the basic Directive, including that provided for in Article [1(3)] must be interpreted restrictively.’ This meant that time doctors spent ‘on call’ where they were ‘obliged to respond to requests for home visits and urgent requests’ was working time and so time going over the 48-hour ceiling violated the Directive.

As the Advocate General also states in point 37 of his Opinion, the situation is different where doctors in primary care teams are on call by being contactable at all times without having to be at the health centre. Even if they are at the disposal of their employer, in that it must be possible to contact them, in that situation doctors may manage their time with fewer constraints and pursue their own interests. In those circumstances, only time linked to the actual provision of primary care services must be regarded as working time within the meaning of Directive 93/104.

== Further developments ==
The decision in this case was applied in UK law by the Employment Appeal Tribunal in the 2006 case, McCartney v Oversley House Management.

== See also ==
- UK labour law
- Working Time Directive
