= Directive 89/391/EEC =

European Union directive

- European Union directive
- Title: Directive on the introduction of measures to encourage improvements in the safety and health of workers at work
- Made by: Council of the European Union
- Made under: Article 118a (Treaty establishing the European Economic Community)
- Journal reference: L 183

History
- Date made: 6 June 1989
- Entry into force: 19 June 1989
- Implementation date: 31 December 1992

Other legislation
- Amended by: Regulation (EC) No 1882/2003, Directive 2007/30/EC, Regulation (EC) No 1137/2008

Directive 89/391/EEC is a European Union directive with the objective to introducing measures to encourage improvements in the safety and health of workers at work. It is described as a "Framework Directive" for occupational safety and health (OSH) by the European Agency for Safety and Health at Work.

== History and effect ==
The proposal for the directive was adopted by the European Commission on 24 February 1988 and transmitted to the European Parliament and the Council of the European Union, which consulted the European Economic and Social Committee. The proposal was approved with amendments in the first and second readings by the European Parliament, after which the Commission adopted amended proposals. The Council approved the re-examined proposal on 12 June 1989.

Directive 89/391/EEC entered into force on 19 June 1989 and member states were obligated to bring into force laws, regulations and administrative provisions to comply with it by 31 December 1992.

The directive was amended three times by legal acts, in 2003, 2007, and 2008.

Directive 89/391/EEC was listed among the ten EU legal acts that most improved the lives of people in the European Union according to a 2016 survey of 72 members of the European Parliament by Die Tageszeitung.

== Individual directives ==
The directive authorizes the Council of the European Union to adopt individual directives in areas listed in its annex. As of 2018, 20 individual directives were adopted:

- first individual directive: Directive 89/654/EEC concerning the minimum safety and health requirements for the workplace
- second individual directive: Directive 2009/104/EC concerning the minimum safety and health requirements for the use of work equipment by workers at work
- third individual directive: Directive 89/656/EEC on the minimum health and safety requirements for the use by workers of personal protective equipment at the workplace
- fourth individual directive: Directive 90/269/EEC on the minimum health and safety requirements for the manual handling of loads where there is a risk particularly of back injury to workers
- fifth individual directive: Directive 90/270/EEC on the minimum safety and health requirements for work with display screen equipment
- sixth individual directive: Directive 2004/37/EC on the protection of workers from the risks related to exposure to carcinogens or mutagens at work
- seventh individual directive: Directive 2000/54/EC on the protection of workers from risks related to exposure to biological agents at work
- eighth individual directive: Directive 92/57/EEC on the implementation of minimum safety and health requirements at temporary or mobile construction sites
- ninth individual directive: Directive 92/58/EEC on the minimum requirements for the provision of safety and/or health signs at work
- tenth individual directive: Directive 92/85/EEC on the introduction of measures to encourage improvements in the safety and health at work of pregnant workers and workers who have recently given birth or are breastfeeding
- eleventh individual directive: Directive 92/91/EEC concerning the minimum requirements for improving the safety and health protection of workers in the mineral- extracting industries through drilling
- twelfth individual directive: Directive 92/104/EEC on the minimum requirements for improving the safety and health protection of workers in surface and underground mineral-extracting industries
- thirteenth individual directive: Directive 93/103/EC concerning the minimum safety and health requirements for work on board fishing vessels
- fourteenth individual directive: Directive 98/24/EC on the protection of the health and safety of workers from the risks related to chemical agents at work
- fifteenth individual directive: Directive 1999/92/EC on minimum requirements for improving the safety and health protection of workers potentially at risk from explosive atmospheres
- sixteenth individual directive: Directive 2002/44/EC on the minimum health and safety requirements regarding the exposure of workers to the risks arising from physical agents (vibration)
- seventeenth individual directive: Directive 2003/10/EC on the minimum health and safety requirements regarding the exposure of workers to the risks arising from physical agents (noise)
- eighteenth individual directive: Directive 2004/40/EC on the minimum health and safety requirements regarding the exposure of workers to the risks arising from physical agents (electromagnetic fields)
  - This directive has been repealed by the twentieth individual directive.
- nineteenth individual directive: Directive 2006/25/EC on the minimum health and safety requirements regarding the exposure of workers to risks arising from physical agents (artificial optical radiation)
- twentieth individual directive: Directive 2013/35/EU on the minimum health and safety requirements regarding the exposure of workers to the risks arising from physical agents (electromagnetic fields)

== See also ==
- European labour law
- List of European Union directives
