= Community Charter of the Fundamental Social Rights of Workers =

The Community Charter of the Fundamental Social Rights of Workers (9 December 1989) is a principles-based charter of human rights that apply specifically to the workforce in the European Union. It is used as an interpretative aid by the Court of Justice of the European Union in construing the meaning of legislation and developing case law. It was initially drafted in 1989. All member states have adopted the text. (Initially, the United Kingdom under Margaret Thatcher's government did not adopt the charter, but the UK subsequently adopted the Charter in 1998).

== Contents ==
- articles 1-3, free movement of workers
- articles 4-6, freedom to choose employment, for fair remuneration, with access to free job placement services
- articles 7-10, improvement of working conditions, rest time, paid annual leave, stipulated by law, collective or individual agreement
- article 10, right to social protection and adequate social security, and adequate social assistance
- articles 11-14, freedom of association, collective bargaining, the right to resort to collective action including the right to strike, but with derogation for the police, armed forces and core civil service
- article 15, right to vocational training
- article 16, equal treatment for men and women;
- articles 17-18, information, consultation and participation of workers to be developed along appropriate lines
- article 19, health protection and safety at the workplace;
- articles 20-26, protection of children, adolescents, elderly persons, and disabled persons.
- articles 27-30, implementation of the charter through legislative measures, led by the Commission.

== Case law ==
- R v Dept of Trade and Industry, ex p Broadcasting, Entertainment, Cinematographic and Theatre Union (2001) C-173/99
- Chacón Navas v Eurest Colectividades SA (2006) C-13/05
- The Rosella or International Transport Workers Federation v Viking Line ABP (2007) C-438/05

== See also ==
- UK labour law
- European labour law
- Labour law
