= Institutions for Occupational Retirement Provision Directive 2016 =

European Union Directive

The Institutions for Occupational Retirement Provision Directive 2016/2341 is a European Union Directive designed to create an internal market for occupational retirement provision. It lays down minimum standards on funding pension schemes, the types of investments pensions may make and permits cross-border management of pension plans.

The original Directive was released in 2003, and was replaced in 2016.

== 2003 Directive contents ==
The original Directive 2003/41/EC contained articles on the following issues.

- art 2, scope
- art 3, application to social security schemes, covered by Regulations (EEC) No 1408/71 and (EEC) No 574/72, insofar as they run non-compulsory occupational plans
- art 4, member states can apply this to insurance companies that do retirement, which are already covered by Directive 2002/83/EC, in which case they must ring fence their assets.
- art 5, exemption for schemes under 100 members
- art 6, definitions
- art 7, institutions activities should be limited to retirement benefits, not other things
- art 8, there must be legal separation between sponsoring institutions and retirement funds so assets are safeguarded on insolvency
- art 9, conditions of operation are that institutions should be in a national register, run by people with professional qualifications, members sufficiently informed, etc.
- art 10, annual accounts and reports from every institution
- art 11, members and beneficiaries must receive annual accounts and reports on request and changes in rules, levels of benefits, etc.
- art 12, each 3 years every fund should produce a statement of investment policy principles
- art 13, authorities should be able to get information from funds
- art 14, authorities should ensure proper accounting and internal controls in each institution
- art 15, technical provisions, biometric risk…
- art 16, sufficient assets to fund technical provisions
- art 17, extra buffer if a fund insures itself
- art 18, investment rules, including "In the case of a potential conflict of interest, the institution, or the entity which manages its portfolio, shall ensure that the investment is made in the sole interest of members and beneficiaries".
- art 19, no restrictions on overseas investment management by member states
- art 20, cross border activities
- art 21, co-operation between member states and the Commission
- art 22, implementation
- art 23, entry into force
- art 24, addressed to member states

== Revision ==
On 27 March 2014, the Commission released a proposed text for revising the Directive, and to recast it consolidating the other pension related Directives. In addition to the existing general provisions that would form Title I, a new IORP Directive would include new titles covering (II) quantitative requirements on where money is invested, (III) minimum standards on retirement fund governance and investment outsourcing, (IV) minimum information rights for retirement fund members, and (V) standards for prudential supervision by member state authorities.

== See also ==
- EU law
- European labour law
- UK labour law
