= Lawrie-Blum v Land Baden-Württemberg =

European Union law case

- Court: European Court of Justice
- Decided: 3 July 1986
- Citations: Case 66/85, [1986] ECR 2121

Keywords
- Free movement of workers Contract of employment

Lawrie-Blum v Land Baden-Württemberg (1986) Case 66/85 was a European Union law case about the free movement of workers within the territory of the European Union. The decision of the European Court of Justice concerned the scope of protection for people with regard to employment rights. The Court took the view that an employment contract requires someone to work under the direction of another.

== Facts ==
Deborah Lawrie-Blum was a British national who had passed the first stage of teacher training whilst studying at the University of Freiburg. She was refused entry to the second stage of training by the State of Baden-Württemberg because teachers in Germany are regarded as civil servants. Federal law stated that such posts could only be held by German citizens. Lawrie-Blum took the case to the Administrative Court (Verwaltungsgericht) in Freiburg on the grounds that she was a worker and therefore entitled to obtain employment in any EEC state.

The Administrative Court Freiburg and subsequently the Higher Administrative Court for the State of Baden-Württemberg (Verwaltungsgerichtshof) held that a trainee teacher was not a ‘worker’ within the terms of Article 45(1) of the Treaty of the European Economic Community, and even if it was, a public servant exemption in Article 45(4) applied. Lawrie-Blum then appealed to the Bundesverwaltungsgericht (Federal Administrative Court) which requested a ruling from the European Court of Justice (ECJ).

== Judgment ==
The ECJ stated that the concept of ‘worker’ in Article 48 should be interpreted broadly as (I) a person (II) performing services (III) under the direction of another (IV) for remuneration, and that included a trainee teacher. Article 45(4) is to be construed narrowly, and only to safeguard a state’s interests,

17. The essential feature of an employment relationship, however, is that for a certain period of time a person performs services for and under the direction of another person in return for which he receives remuneration.

== See also ==
- Contract of employment
- UK labour law
- EU labour law
- German labour law
