= National Minimum Wage Regulations 2015 =

- Statutory Instrument
- Parliament of the United Kingdom
- Citation: SI 2015/621
- Territorial extent: England and Wales; Scotland; Northern Ireland

Dates
- Made: 9 March 2015
- Laid before Parliament: 6 April 2015

Other legislation
- Made under: National Minimum Wage Act 1998

Status: Current legislation

Text of statute as originally enacted

Text of the National Minimum Wage Regulations 2015 as in force today (including any amendments) within the United Kingdom, from legislation.gov.uk.

The National Minimum Wage Regulations 2015 (SI 2015/6221) are a statutory instrument under the National Minimum Wage Act 1998 that elaborate rules on how to calculate whether someone is being paid the minimum wage, who gets it, and how to enforce it.

== See also ==
- UK labour law
- Tax Credits and Child tax credit, Working tax credit
- Wage regulation
