= Zentralbetriebsrat der Landeskrankenhäuser Tirols =

- Court: European Court of Justice
- Decided: 22 April 2010
- Citations: (2010) C-486/08, [2010] IRLR 631

Keywords
- Holidays, part time, fixed term work

Zentralbetriebsrat der Landeskrankenhäuser Tirols (2010) C-486/08 is an EU labour law case.

== Facts ==
Full-time workers became part-time workers, but had not already taken their accrued rights to paid annual leave. The employer contended that as part timers they should only be able to take leave at the rate available as part-time staff. The workers claimed this breached the Part-time Workers Directive and the Fixed-term Workers Directive

== Judgment ==
The ECJ held that although it was appropriate to apply the pro rata principle for holidays when an employee is part-time, “a change, and in particular a reduction, of working hours when moving from full-time to part-time employment cannot reduce the right to annual leave that the worker has accumulated during the period of full-time employment” but “has not been able to exercise while working full-time.” It was not compatible with EU law to provide the worker can only take accrued leave with reduced holiday pay.
