= Adequate Minimum Wage Directive 2022 =

2022 European Union Directive

The Adequate Minimum Wage Directive 2022 (Directive 2022/2041) is a European Union Directive on the setting of minimum wages and collective bargaining in EU law.

== Contents ==
Article 1 states the subject matter of (1)(a) "setting adequate levels of minimum wages" and (b) wage protection "in the form of wages set out by collective agreements". It accords "full respect of the autonomy of social partners, as well as their right to negotiate and conclude collective agreements".

Article 2 sets the scope of workers with "an employment contract or employment relationship" defined by law, collective agreement or practice, considering CJEU case law.

Article 3 sets out basic definitions of minimum wages, collective agreements, bargaining and coverage.

Article 4 requires member states (1) to "aim to increase the collective bargaining coverage" and to (a) promote the building and strengthening of the capacity of the social partners to engage in collective bargaining on wage setting at sector or cross-industry level", and (b) "encourage constructive, meaningful and informed negotiations on wages among social partners". Further (2) where "collective bargaining coverage is less than 80% of the workers" with an employment contract or relationship, there should be "a framework of enabling conditions for collective bargaining", and "an action plan to promote collective bargaining" that is public and notified to the European Commission.

Article 5(1) requires minimum wages have "criteria set to promote adequacy with the aim to achieve decent working and living conditions, social cohesion and upward convergence" defined by national law and practice and tripartite agreements. Under (4) Member States 'may use indicative reference values commonly used at international level such as 60 % of the gross median wage and 50 % of the gross average wage, and/or indicative reference values used at national level. (5) rely on consultative bodies to advise authorities.

Article 6 requires member states to keep any variations of the minimum wage "to a minimum" and ensure they are "non-discriminatory, proportionate, limited in time if relevant, and objectively and reasonably justified by a legitimate aim". Member states must only allow deductions by law if "necessary, objectively justified and proportionate".

Article 7 requires social partners are involved in wage setting and updating.

Article 8 requires that member states (1) ensure controls and inspections for minimum wages are proportionate, non-discriminatory and will progressively "strengthen", (2) enforcement authorities are given guidance "to proactively target and pursue non-compliant businesses", (3) information on minimum wages is made publicly available.

Article 9 applies to public procurement and requires that under the public procurement directives 2014/24/EU, 2014/25/EU and 2014/23/EU, member states must ensure economic operators and their subcontractors "comply with the applicable obligations regarding wages, the right to organise and collective bargaining on wage-setting" for the relevant sector and geographical area and with the statutory minimum wages where they exist.

Articles 10 to 12 require the law is monitored and data collected, ensure workers have effective right to redress and dispute resolution, and that penalties for breach are "effective, proportionate and dissuasive".

Articles 13 to 15 require member states to implement the law, inform people, and evaluate and review it.

Article 16 makes clear that member states may have more favourable provisions and may not regress in standards.

== Denmark v Commission ==
Article 5(2) was held invalid by the Court of Justice in Denmark v Commission. It said that national criteria should include (a) purchasing power of minimum wages and the cost of living (b) general level of gross wages (c) growth rate of gross wages (d) labour productivity developments. Member States under (3) could use automatic adjustment mechanisms, to update the minimum wage with inflation - this was invalid because the mechanisms must not lead to a reduction of the minimum wage.

== See also ==
- European labour law
- UK labour law
