= Regeling v Bestuur van de Bedrijfsvereniging voor de Metaalnijverheid =

- Court: European Court of Justice
- Decided: 14 July 1998
- Citation: (1999) C-125/97, [1999] IRLR 379

Keywords
- Insolvency protection

Regeling v Bestuur van de Bedrijfsvereniging voor de Metaalnijverheid (1999) C-125/97 is a European insolvency law and labour law case, concerning the protection of employees' salaries on their employer's insolvency.

== Facts ==
Mr Regeling was a Dutch welder. He received sporadic pay from January 1991 until August 1991 when with notice the contract was terminated and the employer went bankrupt. He claimed pay from the Bestuur van de Bedrijfsvereniging voor de Metaalnijverheid, the guarantee institution for employee's claims in the Netherlands. This was turned down because the period guaranteed was 13 weeks before termination, and in that period, making up for prior shortfalls, more than normal wages were paid.

== Judgment ==
The European Court of Justice held that Mr Regeling still had a good claim, because the employers late payments should be set off first against the outstanding wage debt. To do otherwise would undermine the minimum protection of the guarantee.

20 The guarantee institutions are required, in principle, in accordance with Article 3(1) of the Directive, to guarantee payment of employees' outstanding claims relating to pay for the period prior to a given date. It is purely by way of derogation that Member States have the option, under Article 4(1), to limit that liability to pay to a given period fixed in accordance with the detailed rules laid down in Article 4(2). As the Advocate General observes at point 45 of his Opinion, that provision must be construed narrowly and in conformity with the social purpose of the Directive, which is to ensure a minimum level of protection for all workers.
