= De bene esse =

De bene esse is a Latin legal term meaning of well being. It can refer to various acts which are conditional, provisional or anticipatory.

== United Kingdom ==
De bene esse has been used in English law for hundreds of years. For example, in Equity Cases Abridged (1744), it was used to describe the deposition of a witness before trial in the Court of Chancery:

After a Bill filed in any Cause, the Court will, on Affidavit, that any of the Witnesses are aged or infirm, sick, or going beyond Sea, so that the Party is in Danger of losing their Testimony, order them to be examined de bene esse, which will make their Depositions valid in that Cause only, and against those who are Parties to it; but if it appear, that they might afterwards have been examined in Chief, regularly, such Depositions shall not be made use of.

In R v Mirza (2004), Lord Hobhouse of Woodborough used the term to refer to evidence which a court receives provisionally for the purpose of assessing its admissibility:

A jury note or letter will, save in exceptional circumstances, always be looked at by the trial judge and, if there is an appeal, by the Court of Appeal (the legal expression is de bene esse – ie for what it is worth); its existence and character will normally be disclosed to the parties' counsel and submissions as to its significance, and/or responded to, be invited.

== United States ==
In the context of American law, a proceeding de bene esse is one "which [is] taken ex parte or provisionally and [is] allowed to stand as well done for the present." A deposition that is used or intended to be used in place of a witness' live testimony in court is referred to as a de bene esse deposition.

In past times, an appearance de bene esse was a special appearance made solely to contest jurisdiction. The procedure has long been abolished in most if not all jurisdictions in favor of allowing jurisdictional objections to be made either by motion or set out as an affirmative defense in a responsive pleading (an answer to the complaint): in the Federal courts, the procedure was superannuated by the adoption of the Federal Rules of Civil Procedure, and, in Pennsylvania, by a 1965 amendment to the state rules of civil procedure. The procedure has been referred to by sovereign citizens.

== Canada ==
In Canadian law, taking of commission evidence at a provincial court level - particularly in hearing the Oral Testimony of [Indigenous] Elders known better as “Elders Protocol”, must be specially requested and only admitted on the hearing Court’s acceptance and approval by issuing an “Elders Protocol Order”. Evidence given under such an Order can include oral stories and oral history, demonstrative evidence (ceremonies, dance, drums, song, dress), and other traditional customs the Elders may use to share their knowledge and stories relating to the case at hand. All such evidence must be taken de bene esse. For example, see Restoule et al. v. Ontario (Court no. C-3512-14), and Restoule v. Canada (Court no. C-3512-14A).
