= Information and Consultation Directive 2002 =

European Union directive

Information and Consultation of Employees Directive 2002/14/EC is a European Union directive on labour law that requires undertakings to inform and consult employees on significant changes to businesses in a standing procedure, typically called a work council.

== See also ==
- European labour law
- UK labour law
- Information and Consultation of Employees Regulations 2004
