= Collective Redundancies Directive 1998 =

EU Directive

The Collective Redundancies Directive 98/59/EC is an EU Directive concerning the procedures and warnings that any employer is under a duty to its workforce to follow if it finds it necessary to make more than 20 employees redundant over 90 days (or 10 to 30 employees depending on the size of the firm over 30 days if the member state chooses this option).

== Content ==
The Directive sets a minimum standard for information and consultation with workers in the event that a significant number of workers are affected by proposed redundancies.

== See also ==
- UK labour law
- European labour law
