= Robins v Secretary of State for Work and Pensions =

Robins v SS for Work and Pensions
- Citations: (2007) C-278/05, [2007] ICR 779

Keywords
- Insolvency protection

Robins v Secretary of State for Work and Pensions (2007) C-278/05 is a UK insolvency law and labour law case, concerning the protection of employees' salaries on their employer's insolvency.

== Facts ==
Robins had been employed by a now insolvent company. He had a final salary pension. The company terminated the scheme and then told everyone there was not enough money to cover members’ benefits. They announced they would reduce benefits for members who had not yet started to receive pension payments. Robins claimed compensation from the Secretary of State for not providing the proper level of social protection under Article 8 of Directive 80/987. David Pannick QC acted for the government.

The High Court asked the ECJ whether the member state needed to fund a scheme that had run out of money, and whether the UK had properly transposed the Directive. If not, should the UK incur liability?

== Judgment ==
Judge Timmermans in the ECJ held that the member state did not require pension funds to be fully guaranteed, because the member state could oblige insurers to buy insurance. However, Robins would gain benefits as low as 20% of entitlement, so the UK's scheme under the Pensions Act 2004 section 286 (establishing the Financial Assistance Scheme) did not ‘protect’ workers like Robins within the meaning of Article 8, so the provision was improperly implemented. A Member State's liability was contingent on a finding of manifest and grave disregard by that state for the limits set on its discretion, Brasserie du Pecheur SA v Germany. To determine liability, the national court would have to take into account the clarity and precision of Article 8 with regard to the level of protection required, as well as the measure of discretion left to the national authorities.

== See also ==
- UK insolvency law
- UK labour law
