= Equality Directive 2000 =

EU labour law directive on discrimination

Directive 2000/78/EC
- European Union directive
- Title: Council directive establishing a general framework for equal treatment in employment and occupation
- Made by: Council
- Made under: Art. 13 TEC
- Journal reference: L303 2 December 2000 pp. 16–22

History
- Date made: 27 November 2000
- Entry into force: 2 December 2000
- Implementation date: 2 December 2003

The Equality Framework Directive 2000/78/EC is an EU Directive, and a major part of EU labour law which aims to combat discrimination on grounds of disability, sexual orientation, religion or belief and age in the workplace. It accompanies the Directive 2000/43/EC on equal treatment between persons irrespective of racial or ethnic origin and the Directive 2006/54/EC on equal treatment of men and women in matters of employment and occupation.

== Background ==
Since the Treaty of Amsterdam came into force in 1999, new EU laws, or Directives, have been enacted in the area of anti-discrimination. The Directive entered into force on 2 December 2000 and gave member states three years to transpose the Directive into law, with an additional three years for legislation in the area of age and disability.

== Exemptions ==
There were two exemptions to Article 15 concerning Northern Ireland agreed during the negotiations specifically to ensure that the Police Service of Northern Ireland can take positive action to recruit both Catholic and Protestant officers (following the reforms suggested by the Independent Commission on Policing for Northern Ireland).

1. To tackle the under-representation of one of the major religious communities in the police service of Northern Ireland, differences in treatment regarding recruitment into that service, including its support staff, shall not constitute discrimination insofar as those differences in treatment are expressly authorised by national legislation. 2. To maintain a balance of opportunity in employment for teachers in Northern Ireland while furthering the reconciliation of historical divisions between the major religious communities there, the provisions on religion or belief in this Directive shall not apply to the recruitment of teachers in schools in Northern Ireland in so far as this is expressly authorised by national legislation.

== Implementation ==
The Directive is currently implemented in England, Wales and Scotland through the Equality Act 2010 (initially by the Employment Equality (Sexual Orientation) Regulations 2003 and Employment Equality (Sexual Orientation) Regulations 2003), and in Northern Ireland through the various Fair Employment and Treatment Orders).

Germany implemented the directive by creation of its General Act on Equal Treatment, Allgemeines Gleichbehandlungsgesetz (AGG) in August 2006.

== See also ==
- EU labour law
- UK labour law
- List of European Union directives
