= Race and Ethnicity Equality Directive 2000 =

European Union anti-discrimination law

Directive 2000/43/EC
- European Union directive
- Title: Council directive implementing the principle of equal treatment between persons irrespective of racial or ethnic origin
- Made by: Council
- Made under: Art. 13 TEC
- Journal reference: L180, 22–26

History
- Date made: 2000-06-27
- Entry into force: 2000-07-19
- Implementation date: 2003-07-19

The Race Equality Directive 2000/43/EC is a legal act of the European Union, concerning European labour law. It implements the principle of equal treatment between persons irrespective of racial or ethnic group. Since the Treaty of Amsterdam came into force in 1999, new EC laws, or Directives, have been enacted in the area of anti-discrimination, and this directive complements other directives on gender and age, disability, religion and sexual orientation (specifically the Equality Directive 2000).

== Overview ==
The principle rules laid down are as follows:

1. Implements the principle of equal treatment between people irrespective of racial or ethnic origin.
2. Gives protection against discrimination in employment and training, education, social protection (including social security and healthcare), social advantages, membership and involvement in organisations of workers and employers and access to goods and services, including housing.
3. Contains definitions of direct and indirect discrimination and harassment and prohibits the instruction to discriminate and victimisation.
4. Allows for positive action measures to be taken, in order to ensure full equality in practice.
5. Gives victims of discrimination a right to make a complaint through a judicial or administrative procedure, associated with appropriate penalties for those who discriminate.
6. Allows for limited exceptions to the principle of equal treatment, for example in cases where a difference in treatment on the ground of race or ethnic origin constitutes a genuine occupational requirement.
7. Shares the burden of proof between the complainant and the respondent in civil and administrative cases, so that once an alleged victim establishes facts from which it may be presumed that there has been discrimination, it is for the respondent to prove that there has been no breach of the equal treatment principle.
8. Provides for the establishment in each Member State of an organisation to promote equal treatment and provide independent assistance to victims of racial discrimination.

== See also ==
- EU law
- EU labour law
- UK labour law
- Equality Act 2010
- List of European Union directives
