= Wage regulation =

Economic policy on income

Wage regulation refers to attempts by a government to regulate wages paid to citizens.

== Minimum wage ==
Minimum wage regulation attempts to set an hourly, or other periodic monetary standard for pay at work. A recent example was the U.K. National Minimum Wage Act 1998. Germany has introduced its own regulation and as of January 1, 2026, it is €13.90.

== Collective bargaining ==
Collective agreements between trade unions and employers can regulate wages of workers according to the needs of the business.

== Arbitration ==
Arbitration involves makes collective agreements between trade unions and employers legally binding and mediated through a state appointed judge or magistrate.

== Economic labour theory ==
An economic analysis of the law holds very simply that any intervention in a contract between two parties creates an inefficient labour market. Wages kept artificially high, by imposing any administrative or monetary costs on employers distorts the labour market equilibrium. For a national economy in a globalised world, that means jobs will go overseas and the unemployment rate rises. Major proponents of this sort of labour economics include Nobel Prize winner from the University of Chicago, Professor Gary Becker.

Professor Becker keeps a blog with well-known academic and judge, Richard Posner. Posner is a lawyer and economist, and wrote a book called Economic Analysis of Law. His starting assumption is that unions are the cartelisation of the labour market. Both would agree, that if its aim is to improve the living standards of society, wage regulation defeats itself. Posner says, “Economics is not a theory about consciousness. Behaviour is rational when it conforms to the model of rational choice, whatever the state of mind of the chooser.” So, any conscious attempt to improve working standards are impossible under this view.

== See also ==
- National Minimum Wage Act 1998
- Ex parte H.V. McKay (1907) 2 CAR 1, Australian labour law case on the living wage
