= Working Time Directive 2003 =

Directive in European Union law

Directive 2003/88/EC
- European Union directive
- Title: Directive 2003/88/EC of the European Parliament and of the Council of 4 November 2003 concerning certain aspects of the organisation of working time
- Made by: European Parliament & Council of the EU
- Made under: Art. 137(2)
- Journal reference: L 299, 2003-11-18, p. 9

History
- Date made: 2003-11-04

Preparative texts
- EESC opinion: C 61, 2003-03-14, p. 123
- EP opinion: 2002-12-17

The Working Time Directive 2003/88/EC is a European Union law Directive and a key part of European labour law. It gives EU workers the right to:

- at least 28 days (four weeks) in paid holidays each year;
- rest breaks of 20 minutes in a 6-hour period;
- daily rest of at least 11 hours in any 24 hours;
- restricts excessive night work;
- at least 24 hours rest in a 7-day period; and
- a right to work no more than 48 hours per week, unless the member state enables individual opt-outs.

It was issued as an update on earlier versions from 22 June 2000 and 23 November 1993. Since excessive working time is cited as a major cause of stress, depression, and illness, the purpose of the directive is to protect people's health and safety. A landmark study conducted by the World Health Organization and the International Labour Organization found that exposure to long working hours is common globally at 8.9%, and according to these United Nations estimates the occupational risk factor with the largest attributable burden of disease, i.e. an estimated 745,000 fatalities from ischemic heart disease and stroke events alone in 2016. This evidence has given renewed impetus for maximum limits on working time to protect human life and health.

== Background ==
Like all European Union directives, this is an instrument which requires member states to enact its provisions in national legislation. The directive applies to all member states. It is possible for a worker to opt out of the 48-hour working week, but not the other requirements.

After the 1993 Council Negotiations, when the 1993 version of the Directive was agreed to after an 11–1 vote, UK Employment Secretary David Hunt said, "It is a flagrant abuse of Community rules. It has been brought forward as such simply to allow majority voting – a ploy to smuggle through part of the Social Chapter by the back door. The UK strongly opposes any attempt to tell people that they can no longer work the hours they want."

== Case law ==
The Working Time Directive has also been clarified and interpreted through a number of rulings in the European Court of Justice. The most notable of these have been the "SIMAP" and "Jaeger" judgments (Sindicato de Médicos de Asistencia Pública v Conselleria de Sanidad y Consumo de la Generalidad Valenciana, 2000 and Landeshauptstadt Kiel v Jaeger, 2003).

The SIMAP judgment defined all times when the worker was required to be present on site as actual working hours, for the purposes of work and rest calculations. The Jaeger judgment confirmed that this was the case even if workers could sleep when their services were not required.

== See also ==
- UK labour law
- German labour law
- Labour law
- Working Time Regulations 1998 (SI 1998/1833)
