= Working Time Regulations 1998 =

United Kingdom Statutory Instrument

Working Time Regulations 1998 (Note: Section 2(1).)
- Statutory Instrument
- Parliament of the United Kingdom
- Citation: SI 1998/1833
- Territorial extent: England and Wales; Scotland; (Note: Section 2(2).)

Dates
- Made: 30 July 1998
- Laid before Parliament: 30 July 1998
- Commencement: 1 October 1998

Other legislation
- Amends: Employment Tribunals Act 1996; Employment Rights Act 1996
- Made under: European Communities Act 1972
- Transposes: Directive 93/104/EC

Status: Amended

Text of statute as originally enacted

Revised text of statute as amended

Text of the Working Time Regulations 1998 as in force today (including any amendments) within the United Kingdom, from legislation.gov.uk.

The Working Time Regulations 1998 (SI 1998/1833) is a statutory instrument in UK labour law which implemented the EU Working Time Directive (93/104/EC). It was updated by the Working Time Regulations 1999 (SI 1999/3372), but these amendments were then withdrawn by the Working Time (Amendment) Regulations 2006 (SI 2006/99) following a legal challenge in the European Court of Justice. It does not extend to Northern Ireland.

== Provisions ==
The Working Time Regulations create a basic set of rights for the time people work, particularly 28 days paid holidays, a right to 20 minute paid breaks for each 6 hours worked, a right to weekly rest of at least one full 24 hour period, and the right to limit the working week to 48 hours. These are designed to be minimum standards, which anybody's individual contract or collective agreement through a trade union may improve upon. The regulations apply to all workers (not just employees) and stipulate minimum rest breaks, daily rest, weekly rest and the maximum average working week.

=== Paid holidays ===
Regulations 13 and 13A create a right to paid annual leave of 28 days, expressed as "four weeks" and an additional "1.6 weeks" (including bank holidays and public holidays). In the Working Time Directive article 7 refers to paid annual leave of "at least four weeks", and under article 5 states that the "weekly rest period" means a "seven-day period". When the directive was implemented in the UK, regulation 13 originally stated "four weeks" but many employers only gave their workers four five-day periods of leave (i.e. 20 days). In response the UK government amended the regulations in 2007 to add the further 1.6 week period, bringing the minimum in line with the European Union requirement for four full weeks (i.e. 28 days). However, this confusion led to the argument that the UK had gone beyond the minimum standards required by the Working Time Directive 2003, even though no country in the EU has a right to fewer holidays than 28 days.

=== Rest periods ===
Regulation 10 creates the right to a minimum period of rest of 20 minutes in any shift lasting over 6 hours. Children under 18 are entitled to a 30-minute break for every 4.5 hours worked.

=== Weekly working time ===
Regulations 4–5 set a default rule that workers may work no more than 48 hours per week and employers are required to do everything reasonable to ensure limits are not broken.

There are however, numerous exceptions to the universal rule. It does not apply to some limited specific sectors. Moreover, "autonomous workers", which according to the UK's Health and Safety Executive, following European Union interpretation and case law, are defined as those with "total control" of both the duration and scheduling of work, are also excluded. Any individual can also voluntarily opt out of the maximum working week of 48 hours.

ECJ case law has confirmed that statutory holiday will continue to accrue during career breaks or sabbaticals.

== Case law ==
Cases listed below that are not between UK-based parties are decisions of the European Court of Justice that bind the UK in the operation of the Working Time Directive and consequently the Regulations.

- UK v Council (Working Time Directive) [1996] ECR I-5755
- Sindicato de Médicos de Asistencia Pública v Conselleria de Sanidad y Consumo de la Generalidad Valenciana [2000] ECR I-7963
- R v DTI, ex parte BECTU [2001] 3 CMLR 7
- Blackburn v Gridquest Limited [2002] IRLR 604
- Landeshauptstadt Kiel v Jaegar [2003] ECR I-08389
- Pfeiffer v Deutsches Rotes Kreuz, Kreisverband Waldshut eV (2005) C-397/01-403/01
- MacCartney v Oversley House Management [2006] IRLR 514
- Lyons v Mitie Security Ltd [2010] IRLR 288, EAT decides a worker who does not give notice to take holidays may lose their paid annual leave entitlement (questionable compatibility with the WTD 2003).

== See also ==
- Tax credit
  - Child tax credit
  - Working tax credit
- Wage regulation

== Bibliography ==
- E McGaughey, A Casebook on Labour Law (Hart 2019) ch 7(1)(a)
