= European labour law =

EU employment legislation

European labour law regulates basic transnational standards of employment and partnership at work in the European Union and countries adhering to the European Convention on Human Rights. In setting regulatory floors to competition for job-creating investment within the Union, and in promoting a degree of employee consultation in the workplace, European labour law is viewed as a pillar of the "European social model". Despite wide variation in employment protection and related welfare provision between member states, a contrast is typically drawn with conditions in the United States.

The European Union, under the Treaty on the Functioning of the European Union, article 153(1) is able to use the ordinary legislation procedure on a list of labour law fields. This notably excludes wage regulation and collective bargaining. Four main fields of EU regulation of labour rights include (1) individual labour rights, (2) anti-discrimination regulations, (3) rights to information, consultation, and participation at work, and (4) rights to job security. In virtually all cases, the EU follows the principle that member states can always create rights more beneficial to workers.

The fundamental principle of labour law is that employees' unequal bargaining power justifies substitution of rules in property and contract with positive social rights so that people may earn a living to fully participate in a democratic society. The EU's competences generally follow principles codified in the Community Charter of the Fundamental Social Rights of Workers 1989, introduced in the "social chapter" of the Treaty of Maastricht.

== History ==
While free movement of workers was central to the first European Economic Community agreement, the development of European labour law has been a gradual process. Originally, the Ohlin Report of 1956 recommended that labour standards did not need to be harmonised, although a general principle of anti-discrimination between men and women was included in the early Treaties. Increasingly, the absence of labour rights was seen as inadequate given the capacity for a "race to the bottom" in international trade if corporations can shift jobs and production to countries with low wages.

The Treaty on the Functioning of the European Union (deriving from the Treaty of Lisbon) lists in article 2(1) the European Union's competence in the field of labour law. What is conspicuously not included is unjust dismissal of workers, and according to article 153(5) "pay, the right of association, the right to strike or the right to impose lock-outs". As it says, "the Union shall support and complement the activities of the Member States in the following fields:"

(a) improvement in particular of the working environment to protect workers' health and safety;
(b) working conditions;
(c) social security and social protection of workers;
(d) protection of workers where their employment contract is terminated;
(e) the information and consultation of workers;
(f) representation and collective defence of the interests of workers and employers, including co-determination, subject to paragraph 5;
(g) conditions of employment for third-country nationals legally residing in Union territory;
(h) the integration of persons excluded from the labour market, without prejudice to Article 166;
(i) equality between men and women with regard to labour market opportunities and treatment at work;
(j) the combating of social exclusion;
(k) the modernisation of social protection systems without prejudice to point (c).

The objectives draw, according to TFEU article 151, inspiration from a number of other treaties and sources, which in turn draw inspiration from the International Labour Organization and the Versailles Treaty.

== Labour and human rights ==
A first group of Directives created a range of individual rights in EU employment relationships. An early EEC Regulation applied specifically to social legislation affecting employment in the road transport sector. The objective of transnational regulation is to progressively raise the minimum floor in line with economic development.

- European Convention on Human Rights articles 4, 6, 9, 10 and 11
- European Social Charter 1961
- Community Charter of the Fundamental Social Rights of Workers 1989

=== Employment contracts ===
The Employment Information Directive 2019 requires that every employee (however defined by member state law) has the right to a written statement of their employment contract.

The consistent jurisprudence of the European Court of Justice is that an employee is generally to be defined according to the fact that he or she is invariably the weaker party in an employment contract, and works under the direction of another.

- Lawrie-Blum v Land Baden-Württemberg (1986) C-66/85, [17] 'the essential feature of an employment relationship ... is that for a certain period of time a person performs services for and under the direction of another person in return for which he receives remuneration.'
- Pfeiffer v Deutsches Rotes Kreuz (2005) C-397/01, "the worker must be regarded as the weaker party to the employment contract and it is therefore necessary to prevent the employer being in a position to disregard the intentions of the other party to the contract or to impose on that party a restriction of his rights without him having expressly given his consent in that regard."
- Danosa v LKB Līzings SIA (2010) C-232/09
- Holterman Ferho Exploitatie BV v Spies Von Büllesheim (2015) C-47/14

The European Court of Justice expressly rules that there are generally no exemptions from the term "employee" for executives under European Law, which would allow member states to restrict employee protection on non-executive-employees.

- Platform Work Directive has been proposed to recognise platforms as employers, and regulate algorithmic management.

=== Free movement ===
Articles 45–48 state that workers have the right to move freely and work anywhere in the EU, without discrimination on grounds of nationality, subject to exceptions to preserve public policy, security and health.

- Citizens Rights Directive 2004/38/EC

There is also an old Directive concerning posted workers which has recently become highly contentious given decisions by the ECJ in The Rosella and Laval.

- Posted Workers Directive 96/71/EC

=== Working time and child care ===
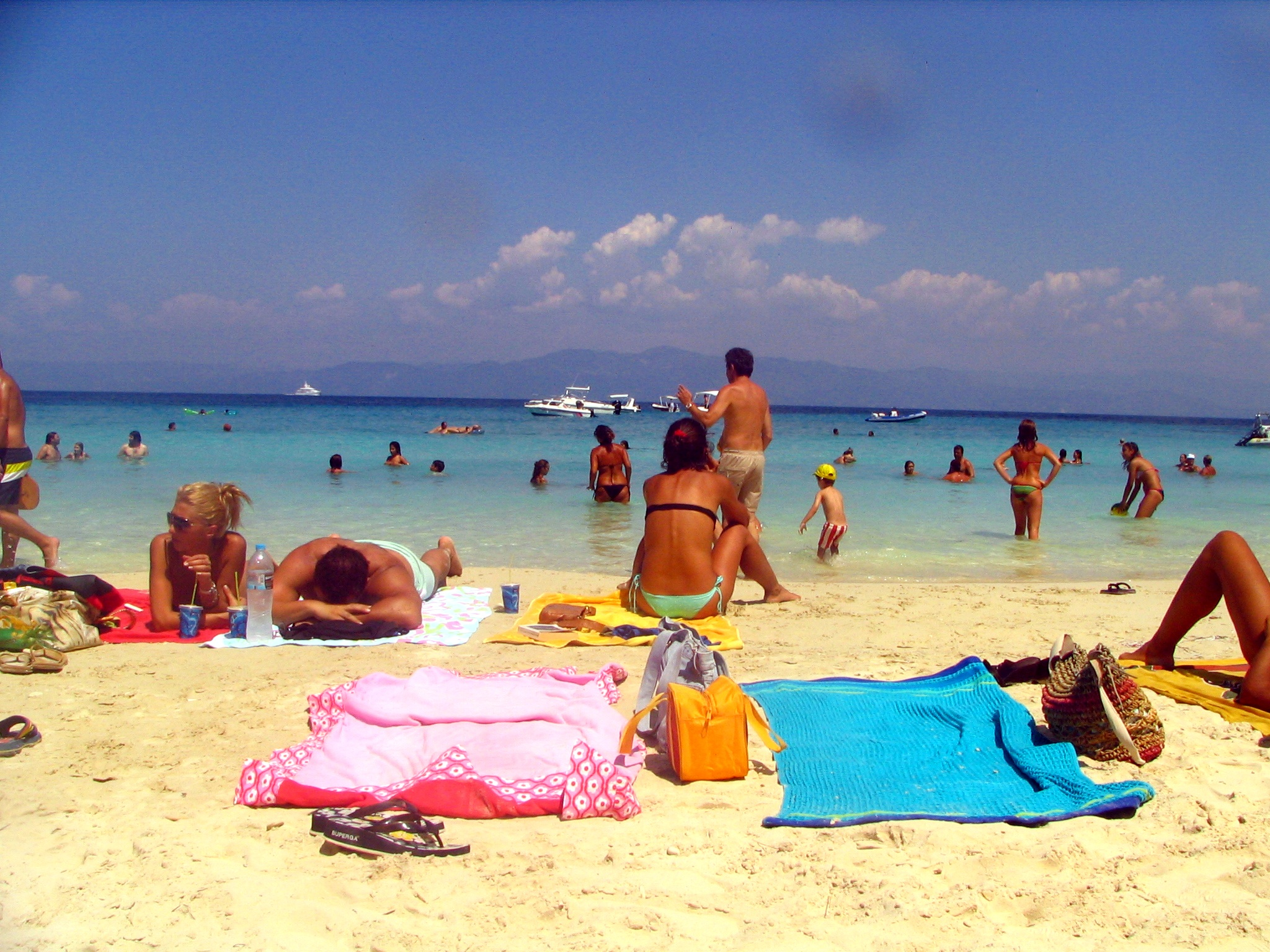
The European Social Charter 1961 art 2(1) requires "the working week to be progressively reduced" with "increase of productivity". The Working Time Directive 2003 requires at least four paid weeks of holiday a year. With two-day weekends, most people in the EU work two-thirds of the year or less.

Reflecting basic standards in the Universal Declaration of Human Rights and ILO Conventions, the Working Time Directive 2003 requires a minimum of 4 weeks (totalling 28 days) paid holidays each year, a minimum of 20-minute paid rest breaks for 6-hour work shifts, limits on night work or time spent on dangerous work, and a maximum 48-hour working week unless a worker individually consents.

The Parental Leave Directive 2019 creates a bare minimum of four months of parental leave (to be used by parents/legal guardians and to be taken before the child reaches a specified age, up to the age of eight, as determined by each Member State) of which al least two months are non-transferable and are paid at a level that is determined by the Member State; ten days of paternity leave paid at least at the level of sick pay; five days carers’ leave; and the Pregnant Workers Directive 1992 creates a right for mothers to a minimum of 14 weeks' paid leave to care for children.

- Working Time Directive 2003/88/EC
- Pregnant Workers Directive 92/85/EEC
- Parental Leave Directive 2019

=== Health and safety ===
The Safety and Health at Work Directive 1989 requires basic requirements to prevent and insure against workplace risks, with employee consultation and participation, and this is complemented by specialised Directives, ranging from work equipment to dangerous industries. In almost all cases, all member states go significantly beyond this minimum.

- Health and Safety of Atypical Workers Directive 1991 91/383/EEC
- Minimum Workplace Safety Directive 1989 89/654/EC

=== Pensions ===
While there is no wage regulation, the Institutions for Occupational Retirement Provision Directive 2003 requires that pension benefits are protected through a national insurance fund, that information is provided to beneficiaries, and minimum standards of governance are observed. These include protecting the "pension promise" of employers in the event of business trouble, and require minimum standards of funding. Most member states go far beyond these requirements, particularly by requiring a vote for employees in who manages their money.

- Insolvency Protection Directive 2008/94/EC article 8
- Robins v Secretary of State for Work and Pensions (2007) C-278/05, the member state pension guarantee institution must reimburse at much more than 20% of pension

During the 2008 financial crisis, the EU created a network of transnational financial regulators in an attempt to prevent the undercutting of standards by countries competing on low regulation. One of these is the European Insurance and Occupational Pensions Authority, which replaced a committee known as the "Committee of European Insurance and Occupational Pensions Supervisors".

- European Insurance and Occupational Pensions Authority Regulation 1094/2010

The tax law for cross-border worker (UE and extra-UE) is regulated by the Directive n. 957/2018.

=== Social security ===
- Equal Treatment in Occupational Social Security Directive 86/378
- Equal Treatment in Social Security Directive 79/7/EEC
- Social Security Regulation 1408/71/EC and 883/2004/EC
- Directive 2005/36/EC

=== Public procurement ===
- Public Contracts Directive 2014 (2014/24/EU) arts 18, 69-71 and Annex X
- RegioPost GmbH & Co v Stadt Landau in der Pfalz (2015) C-115/14

== Collective representation ==
The EU is formally not enabled to legislate on collective bargaining, although the EU, with all member states, is bound by the jurisprudence of the European Court of Human Rights on freedom of association.

=== Participatory governance ===
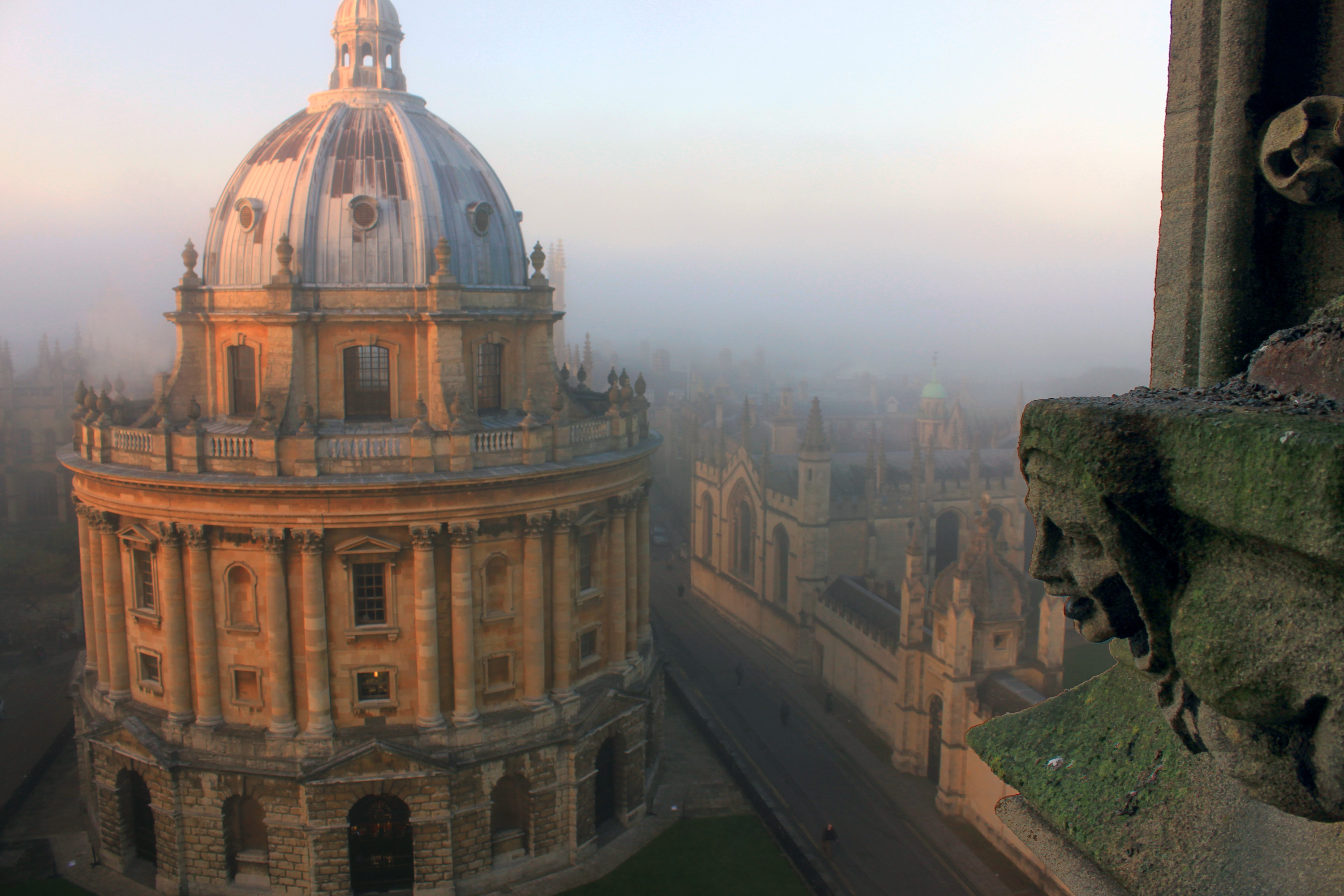
A majority of EU countries have legislation, including the Oxford University Act 1854, which protect employees' right to vote for a corporation's management. This is reflected in the Employee Involvement Directive 2001 for European Companies.

If a company transforms from a member state corporation to incorporate under the European Company Regulation 2001, employees are entitled to no less favourable representation than under the member state's existing board participation laws. This is practically important as a majority of EU member states require employee representation on company boards.

- Employee Involvement Directive 2001/86/EC
- European Company Regulation

=== Information and consultation ===
The Information and Consultation Directive 2002 requires that workplaces with over 20 or 50 staff have the right to set up elected work councils with a range of binding rights, the European Works Council Directive 2009 enables work councils transnationally, and the Employee Involvement Directive 2001 requires representation of workers on company boards in some European Companies. In total, the requirement to inform and consult the workforce (negotiate with a view to agreement) is found in four directives.

- European Works Council Directive 2009/38/EC art 6(3)
- Information and Consultation Directive 2002/14/EC art 4(2)
- Business Transfers Directive 2001/23/EC art 7
- Collective Redundancies Directive 98/59/EC art 2

=== Collective bargaining ===
Theoretically, only the European Court of Human Rights should have competence to decide issues related to collective bargaining and industrial action, as the European Union treaties do not confer competence on the EU to legislate on such issues. The ECHR's scope extends to collective bargaining given the right to freedom of association under article 11. In Wilson and Palmer v United Kingdom the Court held that any detriment for membership of a trade union was incompatible with article 11, and in Demir and Baykara v Turkey the Court held "the right to bargain collectively with the employer has, in principle, become one of the essential elements" of article 11.

This approach, which includes affirmation of the fundamental right to strike in all democratic member states, has been seen as lying in tension with some of the Court of Justice's previous case law, notably ITWF v Viking Line ABP and Laval Un Partneri Ltd v Svenska Byggnadsarbetareforbundet. These decisions suggested the fundamental right of workers to take collective action was subordinate to business freedom to establish and provide services.

- Article 11 ECHR
- Wilson and Palmer v United Kingdom
- Demir and Baykara v Turkey [2008] ECHR 1345
- Erzberger v TUI AG (2017) (C-566/15), scope of free movement of workers
- The Rosella [2008] IRLR 143 (C-438/05), on freedom of establishment
- Laval Un Partneri Ltd v Svenska Byggnadsarbetareforbundet [2008] IRLR 160 (C-319/05, see also (C-319/06), on free movement of services
- Collective Bargaining and Wage Directive COM/2020/682 final

== Equality ==
Beyond the general principle of equality in EU law, six main Directives protect basic equality rights in EU law. The rules are not consolidated, and on gender pay potentially limited in not enabling a hypothetical comparator, or comparators in outsourced business. Equality rules do not yet apply to child care rights, which only give women substantial time off, and consequently hinder equality in men and women caring for children after birth, and pursuing their careers.

=== General principle ===
The principle of equality regardless of status is a fundamental value in all European member states, and constitutes a core principle that pervades the objectives of every institution. Equality was affirmed by the Court of Justice in Kücükdeveci v Swedex GmbH & Co KG to be a general principle of EU law.

- Kücükdeveci v Swedex GmbH & Co KG (2010) C-555/07

This is reflected in a number of TFEU provisions.

- Article 8 (ex Article 3(2) TEC) "In all its activities, the Union shall aim to eliminate inequalities, and to promote equality, between men and women."
- Article 10, "In defining and implementing its policies and activities, the Union shall aim to combat discrimination based on sex, racial or ethnic origin, religion or belief, disability, age or sexual orientation."

=== Protected grounds ===
The Race Equality Directive 2000, Equality Framework Directive 2000 and Equal Treatment Directive 2006 prohibit discrimination based on sexual orientation, disability, religion or belief, age, race and gender. As well as "direct discrimination", there is a prohibition on "indirect discrimination" where employers apply a neutral rule to everybody, but this has a disproportionate impact on the protected group.

- Equality Framework Directive 2000/78/EC
- Race Equality Directive 2000/48/EC
- Equal Treatment Directive 2006/54/EC

=== Atypical workers ===
The Part-time Work Directive 1997, Fixed-term Work Directive 1999 and Temporary Agency Work Directive 2008 generally require that people who do not have ordinary full-time, permanent contracts are treated no less favourably than their colleagues. However, the scope of the protected worker is left to member state law, and the TAWD 2008 only applies to "basic working conditions" (mostly pay, working hours and participation rights) and enabled member states to have a qualifying period.

- Part-time Workers Directive 97/81/EC
- Fixed-term Work Directive 99/70/EC
- Temporary and Agency Work Directive 2008/104/EC

== Job security ==
Minimum job security rights are provided by three Directives. There are further norms in the Treaties which aspire to create a high level of employment in the EU.

=== Business restructuring ===
The Collective Redundancies Directive 1998 specifies that minimum periods of notice and consultation occur if more than a set number of jobs in a workplace are at risk. The Transfers of Undertakings Directive 2001 require that staff retain all contractual rights, unless there is an independent economic, technical or organisational reason, if their workplace is sold from one company to another. Last, the Insolvency Protection Directive 2008 requires that employees' wage claims are protected in the event that their employer falls insolvent. This last Directive gave rise to Francovich v Italy, where the Court of Justice affirmed that member states which fail to implement the minimum standards in EU Directives are liable to pay compensation to employees who should have rights under them.

- Junk v Kühnel (2005) C-188/03, [43] the Collective Redundancies Directive 1998 ‘imposes an obligation to negotiate’.
- USDAW v WW Realisation 1 Ltd (2015) C-80/14, Fifth Chamber

=== Unemployment ===
US and EU unemployment rates, 1993–2009.

Today, the EU is required under TFEU article 147 to contribute to a "high level of employment by encouraging cooperation between Member States". This has not resulted in legislation, which usually requires taxation and fiscal stimulus for significant change, while the European Central Bank's monetary policy has been acutely controversial during the Eurozone crisis. The EU undertakes ad hoc initiatives to combat unemployment, but only indirectly through better regulation. It does not have any specific fiscal stimulus programme, outside funds used for general regional development.

- TFEU Article 9, "In defining and implementing its policies and activities, the Union shall take into account requirements linked to the promotion of a high level of employment, the guarantee of adequate social protection, the fight against social exclusion, and a high level of education, training and protection of human health."
- Articles 145–150, on coordinated strategies to promote employment
- European Union Labour Force Survey
- Eurostat
- European debt crisis
- Post-2008 Irish economic downturn
- Greek government-debt crisis
- 2008–2014 Spanish financial crisis
- 2010–2014 Portuguese financial crisis

== Gig economy legislation ==
In December 2021, the European Commission published new draft legislation to ensure gig workers get a minimum wage, access to sick pay, holidays and general employment rights. The announcement sent stock prices of gig economy brands lower, including Deliveroo, Just Eat Takeaway, Delivery Hero.

== See also ==
- United Kingdom labour law
- United States labor law
- German labour law
- International labour law
- Labour law
- Work–life balance
- Work–life balance in Germany
- Court of Justice of the European Union
