= Suitable reasonable employment (UK) =

Suitable reasonable employment is a concept which is used in the United Kingdom redundancy scenarios.

It occurs when a job has been made redundant and the employer offers the redundant job holder an alternative position. If the position is within the skills and capabilities of the individual, has similar terms and conditions, is at a similar level and is locationally appropriate, the chances are that they will be obliged to take it. An employee who unreasonably refuses an offer of suitable alternative employment will not normally be entitled to redundancy pay.

It is also the case that if the employer has a vacant position available which is within the skills and experience of a redundant employee, they should offer that position as a "suitable reasonable alternative".
