= List of statutory instruments of the United Kingdom, 2010 =

This is a complete list of all 2,967 statutory instruments of the United Kingdom in 2010.

== 1–100 ==
- The Occupational Pension Schemes (Levy Ceiling – Earnings Percentage Increase) Order (SI 2010/1)
- The National Lottery Act 2006 (Commencement No. 5) Order 2010 (SI 2010/2)
- The National Employment Savings Trust Corporation Naming and Financial Year Order (SI 2010/3)
- The Employers’ Duties (Implementation) Regulations (SI 2010/4)
- The Employers’ Duties (Registration and Compliance) Regulations (SI 2010/5)
- The Transfer Values (Disapplication) Regulations (SI 2010/6)
- The Public Interest Disclosure (Prescribed Persons) (Amendment) Order (SI 2010/7)
- The Application of Pension Legislation to the National Employment Savings Trust Corporation Regulations (SI 2010/8)
- The National Employment Savings Trust (Consequential Provisions) Order (SI 2010/9)
- The Pensions Act 2008 (Commencement 5) Order (SI 2010/10)
- The National Lottery (Annual Licence Fees) Regulations (SI 2010/17)
- The Legislative Reform (Insolvency) (Miscellaneous Provisions) Order (SI 2010/18)
- The Social Security (Contributions Credits for Parents and Carers) Regulations (SI 2010/19)
- The Amendment to Schedule 6 to the Tribunals, Courts and Enforcement Act 2007 Order (SI 2010/20)
- The Transfer of Functions of the Asylum and Immigration Tribunal Order (SI 2010/21)
- The Transfer of Tribunal Functions Order (SI 2010/22)
- The Health and Social Care Act 2008 (Commencement 14) Order (SI 2010/23)
- The Coroners and Justice Act 2009 (Commencement 2) Order (SI 2010/28)
- The Overhead Lines (Exempt Installations) (Consequential Provisions) Order (SI 2010/29)
- The Health Act 2009 (Commencement 1) Order (SI 2010/30)
- The Data Protection (Monetary Penalties) (Maximum Penalty and Notices) Regulations (SI 2010/31)
- The Trade Marks (International Registration) (Amendment) Order (SI 2010/32)
- The Patents and Patents and Trade Marks (Fees) (Amendment) Rules (SI 2010/33)
- The Proscribed Organisations (Name Changes) Order (SI 2010/34)
- The Banking Act 2009 (Exclusion of Insurers) Order (SI 2010/35)
- The Crime (International Co-operation) Act 2003 (Designation of Participating Countries) (England, Wales and Northern Ireland) Order (SI 2010/36)
- The Perpetuities and Accumulations Act 2009 (Commencement) Order (SI 2010/37)
- The Common Agricultural Policy Single Payment and Support Schemes (Cross Compliance) (Wales) (Amendment) Regulations (SI 2010/38)
- The Common Agricultural Policy Single Payment and Support Schemes (Appeals) Regulations (SI 2010/39)
- The First-tier Tribunal and Upper Tribunal (Chambers) (Amendment) Order (SI 2010/40)
- The Tribunals, Courts and Enforcement Act 2007 (Miscellaneous Provisions) Order (SI 2010/41)
- The First-tier Tribunal (Gambling) Fees Order (SI 2010/42)
- The Tribunal Procedure (Amendment) Rules (SI 2010/43)
- The Tribunal Procedure (Amendment 2) Rules (SI 2010/44)
- The Welfare Reform Act 2009 (Commencement 1) Order (SI 2010/45)
- The M4 Motorway (Slip Roads at Junction 34, Miskin and Junction 35, Pencoed) (Temporary Prohibition of Vehicles) Order 2010 (SI 2010/46)
- The Health and Social Care Act 2008 (Commencement 13, Transitory and Transitional Provisions and Electronic Communications) Amendment Order (SI 2010/47)
- The Preserved Counties of Powys and Mid Glamorgan (Changes in Area) Order (SI 2010/48)
- The Care Quality Commission (Registration) Amendment Regulations (SI 2010/49)
- The Holocaust (Return of Cultural Objects) Act 2009 (Commencement) Order (SI 2010/50)
- The Inheritance Tax (Qualifying Non-UK Pension Schemes) Regulations (SI 2010/51)
- The Policing and Crime Act 2009 (Commencement 2) Order (SI 2010/52)
- The M2 Motorway and the A2 Trunk Road (Brenley Corner – Junction 6) (Temporary Restriction of Traffic) Order (SI 2010/53)
- The A14 Trunk Road (Junction 24 Godmanchester to Junction 23 Spittals Interchange, Huntingdon, Cambridgeshire) (Temporary Restriction and Prohibition of Traffic) Order (SI 2010/54)
- The M25 Motorway (Junctions 6 – 10, Slip Roads) (Temporary Prohibition of Traffic) Order (SI 2010/56)
- The A27 Trunk Road (Shoreham By-Pass) (Temporary Restriction and Prohibition of Traffic) Order (SI 2010/57)
- The M60 Motorway (Junction 27, Clockwise Entry Slip Road) (Temporary Prohibition of Traffic) Order (SI 2010/58)
- The M4 Motorway and A4042 Trunk Road (Grove Park Roundabout, Newport) (Temporary Traffic Restriction and Prohibition) Order 2010 (SI 2010/59)
- The Criminal Procedure Rules (SI 2010/60)
- The Commons Act 2006 (Commencement 5) (England) Order (SI 2010/61)
- The M1/M18 Motorways (Junction 32, Thurcroft Interchange) (Temporary Prohibition of Traffic) Order (SI 2010/62)
- The A64 Trunk Road (Hopgrove Roundabout to Hazelbush Crossroads) (Temporary Restriction and Prohibition of Traffic) Order (SI 2010/63)
- The Legislative Reform (Revocation of Prescribed Form of Penalty Notice for Disorderly Behaviour) Order (SI 2010/64)
- The Control of Salmonella in Turkey Flocks (Wales) Order (SI 2010/65)
- The Private Water Supplies (Wales) Regulations (SI 2010/66)
- The A1(M) Motorway and the A1 Trunk Road (Birtley Interchange to Kingsway Interchange) (Temporary Restriction and Prohibition of Traffic) Order (SI 2010/67)
- The M18 Motorway (Junction 3 To Junction 4) (Temporary Prohibition of Traffic) Order (SI 2010/68)
- The Air Navigation (Restriction of Flying) (Cheltenham Festival) Regulations 2010 (SI 2010/69)
- The A1(M) Motorway (Junction 57 to Junction 58) (Temporary Restriction of Traffic) Order (SI 2010/70)
- The M4 Motorway (Junction 24, Coldra Interchange, Newport) (40 MPH Speed Limit) Regulations (SI 2010/71)
- The A66 Trunk Road (Little Burdon Roundabout to Longnewton Interchange) (Temporary Restriction and Prohibition of Traffic) Order (SI 2010/72)
- The A1(M) Motorway (Junction 37, Marr) (Temporary Prohibition of Traffic) Order (SI 2010/73)
- The M62 Motorway (Junction 11 to 12 Eastbound) (Temporary Restriction of Traffic) Order (SI 2010/74)
- The Pollution Prevention and Control (Designation of Directives)(England and Wales) Order (SI 2010/75)
- The National Health Service (Functions of the First-tier Tribunal relating to Primary Medical, Dental and Ophthalmic Services) Regulations (SI 2010/76)
- The Council Tax (Alteration of Lists and Appeals) (Amendment) (Wales) Regulations (SI 2010/77)
- The M60 Motorway (Junction 1, Clockwise Exit Slip Road) (Temporary Prohibition of Traffic) Order (SI 2010/80)
- The M6 Motorway (Junctions 44–45 Northbound and Southbound Carriageways and Junction 45 Northbound Exit and Southbound Entry Slip Roads) (Temporary Prohibition and Restriction of Traffic) Order (SI 2010/81)
- The A66 Trunk Road (Scales Cycleway Project) (Temporary Prohibition and Restriction of Traffic) Order (SI 2010/82)
- The A595 Trunk Road (Lillyhall Roundabout to Dobbies Roundabout, Lillyhall) (Temporary Prohibition and Restriction of Traffic) Order (SI 2010/83)
- The M6 Motorway (Junctions 39–42, Northbound and Southbound Carriageways and Junction 40 Northbound and Junction 41 Southbound Entry Slip Roads) (Temporary Prohibition and Restriction of Traffic) Order (SI 2010/84)
- The M4 Motorway (Junction 19 Eastbound Entry Slip Road) (Temporary Prohibition of Traffic) Order (SI 2010/85)
- The Financial Services and Markets Act 2000 (Regulated Activities) (Amendment) Order (SI 2010/86)
- The M5 Motorway (Junction 12 Northbound Exit Slip Road) (Temporary Prohibition of Traffic) Order (SI 2010/87)
- The M5 Motorway (Junctions 12-11A) (Temporary Restriction of Traffic) Order (SI 2010/88)
- The Cross-Border Payments in Euro Regulations (SI 2010/89)
- The A38 Trunk Road (Notter Bridge Junction, Near Landrake, Cornwall) (Temporary Prohibition and Restriction of Traffic) Order (SI 2010/90)
- The A47 Trunk Road (North of Wisbech, Cambridgeshire to Terrington St. John, Norfolk) (Temporary Restriction and Prohibition of Traffic) Order (SI 2010/91)
- The A12 Trunk Road (St Peter's Street and Artillery Way, Lowestoft, Suffolk) (Temporary Prohibition of Traffic) Order (SI 2010/92)
- The Agency Workers Regulations (SI 2010/93)
- The M1 Motorway (Junction 36, Tankersley) (Temporary Restriction and Prohibition of Traffic) Order (SI 2010/94)
- The Community Legal Service (Funding) (Amendment) Order (SI 2010/95)
- The Community Legal Service (Financial) (Amendment) Regulations (SI 2010/96)
- The A14 Trunk Road (Junction 24 Godmanchester to Junction 27 Fenstanton, Huntingdon, Cambridgeshire) (Temporary Prohibition of Traffic) Order (SI 2010/97)
- The Civil Enforcement of Parking Contraventions Designation Order (SI 2010/98)
- The Bus Lane Contraventions (Approved Local Authorities) (England) (Amendment) Order (SI 2010/99)
- The Lewisham Hospital National Health Service Trust (Establishment) Amendment Order (SI 2010/100)

== 101–200 ==
- The Planning Act 2008 (Commencement 4 and Saving) Order (SI 2010/101)
- The Infrastructure Planning (Interested Parties) Regulations (SI 2010/102)
- The Infrastructure Planning (Examination Procedure) Rules (SI 2010/103)
- The Infrastructure Planning (Compulsory Acquisition) Regulations (SI 2010/104)
- The Infrastructure Planning (Miscellaneous Prescribed Provisions) Regulations (SI 2010/105)
- The Infrastructure Planning (Fees) Regulations (SI 2010/106)
- The M5 Motorway (Junctions 9 – 12) (Temporary Restriction of Traffic) Order (SI 2010/107)
- The Poultry Compartments (England) Order (SI 2010/108)
- The South East Derbyshire College (Dissolution) Order (SI 2010/109)
- The A19 Trunk Road and the A66 Trunk Road (Stockton Road Interchange) (Temporary Prohibition of Traffic) Order (SI 2010/110)
- The A249 Trunk Road (Key Street – Cowstead Roundabout) (Temporary Prohibition of Traffic) Order (SI 2010/111)
- The Local Government and Public Involvement in Health Act 2007 (Commencement 9) Order (SI 2010/112)
- The A35 Trunk Road (Winterbourne Abbas, Dorset) (Restriction) Order 2000 (Variation) Order (SI 2010/113)
- The M58 Motorway (Junctions 2–3 Eastbound Carriageway and Junction 3 Eastbound Exit Slip Road) (Temporary Prohibition and Restriction of Traffic) Order (SI 2010/114)
- The Video Recordings (Labelling) Regulations (SI 2010/115)
- The A55 Trunk Road (Junctions with A51, A483 and A41 Westbound and Eastbound Entry Slip Roads) (Temporary Prohibition and Restriction of Traffic) Order (SI 2010/116)
- The M56 Motorway (Junctions 9–16, Westbound and Eastbound Carriageways, Link and Slip Roads), the M53 and M6 (Link Roads) and the A494 Trunk Road (Temporary Prohibition and Restriction of Traffic) Order (SI 2010/117)
- The Community Radio (Amendment) Order (SI 2010/118)
- The Air Navigation (Restriction of Flying) [Bushey] Regulations 2010 (SI 2010/119)
- The Air Navigation (Restriction of Flying) (Jet Formation Display Teams) Regulations 2010 (SI 2010/120)
- The Export Control (Amendment) Order (SI 2010/121)
- The A66 Trunk Road (Bassenthwaite Lake) (Temporary Prohibition and Restriction of Traffic) Order (SI 2010/122)
- The Regulation of Investigatory Powers (Covert Human Intelligence Sources: Matters Subject to Legal Privilege) Order (SI 2010/123)
- The Planning Act 2008 (Railways Designation) Order (SI 2010/124)
- The Policing and Crime Act 2009 (Commencement 3) Order (SI 2010/125)
- The Identity Cards Act 2006 (Commencement 7) Order (SI 2010/126)
- The Crime and Disorder Act 1998 (Youth Conditional Cautions: Code of Practice) Order (SI 2010/127)
- The Work and Families Act 2006 (Commencement 3) Order (SI 2010/128)
- The Domestic Violence, Crime and Victims Act 2004 (Commencement 13) Order (SI 2010/129)
- The Football Spectators (2010 World Cup Control Period) Order (SI 2010/130)
- The Employment Tribunals (Constitution and Rules of Procedure) (Amendment) Regulations (SI 2010/131)
- The Export Control (North Korea) (Amendment) Order (SI 2010/132)
- The Criminal Justice Act 2003 (Conditional Cautions: Code of Practice) Order (SI 2010/133)
- The Business Rate Supplements (Administrative Expenses) (England) Regulations (SI 2010/134)
- The A66 Trunk Road (Bassenthwaite Lake)(50 Miles Per Hour Speed Limit) Order (SI 2010/135)
- The M56 Motorway (Junction 4 Westbound Exit Slip Road)(Temporary Prohibition of Traffic) Order (SI 2010/136)
- The Social Security (Medical Evidence) and Statutory Sick Pay (Medical Evidence) (Amendment) Regulations (SI 2010/137)
- The A5036 Trunk Road (Dedicated Left Turn Filter Lane Leading to the A5038 Southbound) (Temporary Prohibition of Traffic) Order (SI 2010/138)
- The Consumer Credit Act 1974 (Fees) Order (SI 2010/139)
- The Council Tax and Non-Domestic Rating (Demand Notices) (England) (Amendment) Regulations (SI 2010/140)
- The Criminal Defence Service (Information Requests) (Prescribed Benefits) (Amendment) Regulations (SI 2010/141)
- The Criminal Defence Service (Contribution Orders) (Amendment) Regulations (SI 2010/142)
- The Mental Health Act 2007 (Commencement 11) Order (SI 2010/143)
- The Export Control (Iran) (Amendment) Order (SI 2010/144)
- The Coroners and Justice Act 2009 (Commencement 3 and Transitional Provision) Order (SI 2010/145)
- The Valuation for Rating (Plant and Machinery) (Wales) (Amendment) Regulations (SI 2010/146)
- The Private Water Supplies (Wales) (Amendment) Regulations (SI 2010/147)
- The Ordinary Statutory Paternity Pay (Adoption), Additional Statutory Paternity Pay (Adoption) and Statutory Adoption Pay (Adoptions from Overseas) (Persons Abroad and Mariners) Regulations (SI 2010/150)
- The Statutory Paternity Pay and Statutory Adoption Pay (Persons Abroad and Mariners) Regulations 2002 (Amendment) Regulations (SI 2010/151)
- The Additional Statutory Paternity Pay (National Health Service Employees) Regulations (SI 2010/152)
- The Social Security Contributions and Benefits Act 1992 (Application of Parts 12ZA and 12ZB to Adoptions from Overseas) Regulations 2003 (Amendment) Regulations (SI 2010/153)
- The Additional Statutory Paternity Pay (Birth, Adoption and Adoptions from Overseas) (Administration) Regulations (SI 2010/154)
- The Employee Study and Training (Procedural Requirements) Regulations (SI 2010/155)
- The Employee Study and Training (Eligibility, Complaints and Remedies) Regulations (SI 2010/156)
- The Enactment of Extra-Statutory Concessions Order (SI 2010/157)
- The A34 Trunk Road (Botley Interchange, Southbound Exit Slip Road) (Temporary Prohibition of Traffic) Order (SI 2010/158)
- The A27 Trunk Road (Warblington Interchange – Falmer Interchange, Slip Roads) (Temporary Prohibition of Traffic) Order (SI 2010/160)
- The A23 Trunk Road and the M23 Motorway (Junctions 9 – 11, Slip Roads) (Temporary Prohibition of Traffic) Order (SI 2010/161)
- The A3 Trunk Road (Clanfield, Northbound Exit Slip Road) (Temporary Prohibition of Traffic) Order (SI 2010/162)
- The A27 Trunk Road (Cop Hall Roundabout, Dedicated Link Road) (Temporary Prohibition of Traffic) Order (SI 2010/163)
- The A5 Trunk Road (High Street North, Dunstable, Bedfordshire) (Temporary Restriction and Prohibition of Traffic) Order (SI 2010/164)
- The A1(M) Motorway (Junction 8, Hertfordshire) Slip Roads (Temporary Prohibition of Traffic) Order (SI 2010/165)
- The Hill Farm Allowance Regulations (SI 2010/167)
- The M61 Motorway (Southbound and Northbound Link Roads to and from the A580 Eastbound and Westbound) (Temporary Prohibition of Traffic) Order (SI 2010/171)
- The Court Funds (Amendment) Rules (SI 2010/172)
- The M1 Motorway (Junction 32 to Junction 35) and the M18 Motorway (Thurcroft Interchange) (Temporary Restriction and Prohibition of Traffic) Order (SI 2010/173)
- The A12 Trunk Road (Yarmouth Road, Lowestoft, Suffolk) (Temporary 10 Miles Per Hour Speed Restriction) Order (SI 2010/174)
- The A64 Trunk Road (The A19 Fulford Interchange) (Temporary Prohibition of Traffic) Order (SI 2010/175)
- The A66 Trunk Road (Appleby Bypass) (Temporary Prohibition and Restriction of Traffic) Order (SI 2010/176)
- The M6 Motorway (Junctions 37–35, Southbound Carriageway and Junction 36 Southbound Exit Slip Road) (Temporary Prohibition and Restriction of Traffic) Order (SI 2010/177)
- The A38 Trunk Road (Drybridge Junction, Rattery, Devon) (Temporary Prohibition of Traffic) Order (SI 2010/178)
- The A38 Trunk Road (Near Ripley, Derbyshire) (Temporary Restriction and Prohibition of Traffic) Order (SI 2010/179)
- The Scottish Register of Tartans Act 2008 (Consequential Modifications) Order (SI 2010/180)
- The A12 Trunk Road (Howe Green Interchange Junction 17 to Galleywood Interchange Junction 16, Essex) (Temporary Restriction and Prohibition of Traffic) Order (SI 2010/181)
- The A1 Trunk Road (Stamford to Stretton) (Temporary Prohibition of Traffic) Order (SI 2010/182)
- The A5 Trunk Road (Near Hinckley, Leicestershire) (Temporary Restriction and Prohibition of Traffic) Order (SI 2010/183)
- The A46 Trunk Road (Wanlip to Kirby Muxloe, Leicestershire) (Temporary Restriction and Prohibition of Traffic) Order (SI 2010/184)
- The Ealing Hospital National Health Service Trust (Establishment) Amendment Order (SI 2010/185)
- The Coroners and Justice Act 2009 (Commencement 3 and Transitional Provision) (Amendment) Order (SI 2010/186)
- The Business Rate Supplements (Collection and Enforcement) (England) Regulations (SI 2010/187)
- The Social Security (Contributions) (Amendment 2) Regulations (SI 2010/188)
- The Personal Injuries (NHS Charges) (Amounts) Amendment Regulations (SI 2010/189)
- The School Budget Shares (Prescribed Purposes) (England) (Amendment) Regulations (SI 2010/190)
- The Offender Management Act 2007 (Commencement 5) Order (SI 2010/191)
- The Learner Travel Information (Wales) (Amendment) Regulations (SI 2010/192)
- The Bus Service Operators Grant (Wales) (Amendment) Regulations (SI 2010/193)
- The Travel Concessions (Eligible Services) (Amendment) Order (SI 2010/194)
- The Offender Management Act 2007 (Establishment of Probation Trusts) Order (SI 2010/195)
- The Pension Protection Fund and Occupational Pension Schemes (Miscellaneous Amendments) Regulations (SI 2010/196)
- The Criminal Justice Act 2003 (Mandatory Life Sentence: Determination of Minimum Term) Order (SI 2010/197)
- The Pedal Bicycles (Safety) Regulations (SI 2010/198)
- The A38 Trunk Road (A516 Link Road, Derby) (Temporary Prohibition of Traffic) Order (SI 2010/199)
- The M62 Motorway (Junction 21 Eastbound Carriageway) (Temporary Restriction Of Traffic) Order (SI 2010/200)

== 201–300 ==
- The M6 Motorway (Junctions 20 and 20a, Northbound and Southbound Carriageways and Junction 20 Northbound Exit Slip Road) and the M56 Eastbound Link Road Leading to the M6 Southbound (Temporary Prohibition and Restriction of Traffic) Order (SI 2010/201)
- The A21 Trunk Road (John's Cross – Baldslow, Carriageways) (Temporary Prohibition of Traffic) Order (SI 2010/202)
- The M3 Motorway (Junctions 13 and 14, Slip/Link Roads) (Temporary Prohibition of Traffic) Order (SI 2010/204)
- The A21 Trunk Road (Morley's Interchange – Pembury Road Interchange, Slip Roads) (Temporary Prohibition of Traffic) Order (SI 2010/205)
- The M20 Motorway (Junctions 11 – 11A) (Temporary Restriction of Traffic) Order (SI 2010/206)
- The Sexual Offences Act 2003 (Prescribed Police Stations) Regulations (SI 2010/207)
- The A21 Trunk Road (North of Pembury Road Interchange – Lamberhurst Roundabout) (Temporary Restriction and Prohibition of Traffic) Order (SI 2010/208)
- The A249 Trunk Road (Wormdale Hill Overbridge – Chestnut Street Overbridge, Lay-By) (Temporary Prohibition of Traffic) Order (SI 2010/209)
- The School Finance (England) (Amendment) Regulations (SI 2010/210)
- The National Assistance (Sums for Personal Requirements and Assessment of Resources) Amendment (England) Regulations (SI 2010/211)
- The Local Government (Wales) Measure 2009 (Consequential Modifications) Order (SI 2010/212)
- The Legal Services Act 2007 (Levy) Rules (SI 2010/213)
- The Criminal Procedure and Investigations Act 1996 (Notification of Intention to Call Defence Witnesses) (Time Limits) Regulations (SI 2010/214)
- The M4 Motorway (Junctions 5 – 7) (Temporary Restriction and Prohibition of Traffic) Order (SI 2010/217)
- The M20 Motorway (Junctions 4 – 7) (Temporary Restriction and Prohibition of Traffic) Order (SI 2010/218)
- The Local Authorities (Alteration of Requisite Calculations) (England) Regulations (SI 2010/219)
- The Council Tax Limitation (Maximum Amounts) (England) Order (SI 2010/220)
- The A14 Trunk Road (Junction 23 Spittals Interchange to Alconbury, Cambridgeshire) (Temporary Restriction and Prohibition of Traffic) Order (SI 2010/221)
- The M11 Motorway and A14 Trunk Road (Girton Interchange and Bar Hill Interchange to St. Ives, Cambridgeshire) (Temporary Restriction and Prohibition of Traffic) Order (SI 2010/222)
- The A14 Trunk Road (Junction 50 Cedars Interchange, Stowmarket, Suffolk) (Temporary Prohibition of Traffic) Order (SI 2010/223)
- The A11 Trunk Road (Roudham Heath Picnic Site Access Road, Norfolk) (Temporary Prohibition of Traffic) Order (SI 2010/224)
- The A12 Trunk Road (Crown Interchange Junction 29, Colchester, Essex) (Temporary Restriction and Prohibition of Traffic) Order (SI 2010/225)
- The A14 Trunk Road (Junction 17 Leighton Bromswold, Cambridgeshire) (Temporary Prohibition of Traffic) Order (SI 2010/226)
- The State Pension Credit (Disclosure of Information) (Electricity Suppliers) Regulations (SI 2010/227)
- The Immigration and Nationality (Cost Recovery Fees) Regulations (SI 2010/228)
- The A1 Trunk Road (Newton Low Hall to Alnwick) (Temporary Restriction and Prohibition of Traffic) Order (SI 2010/229)
- The A1(M) Motorway and the A690 Trunk Road (Junction 62, Carville Interchange) (Temporary Restriction and Prohibition of Traffic) Order (SI 2010/230)
- The Pharmacy Order (SI 2010/231)
- The European Communities (Definition of Treaties) (1996 Hague Convention on Protection of Children etc.) Order (SI 2010/232)
- The Health Professions (Hearing Aid Dispensers) Order (SI 2010/233)
- The General and Specialist Medical Practice (Education, Training and Qualifications) Order (SI 2010/234)
- The Inspectors of Education, Children's Services and Skills Order (SI 2010/235)
- The National Assembly for Wales (Legislative Competence) (Health and Health Services and Social Welfare) Order (SI 2010/236)
- The Double Taxation Relief and International Tax Enforcement (Luxembourg) Order (SI 2010/237)
- The Consular Fees Order (SI 2010/238)
- The Parliamentary Commissioner Order (SI 2010/239)
- The Naval, Military and Air Forces Etc. (Disablement and Death) Service Pensions (Amendment) Order (SI 2010/240)
- The Double Taxation Relief and International Tax Enforcement (Qatar) Order (SI 2010/241)
- The National Insurance Contribution Credits (Transfer of Functions) (Northern Ireland) Order (SI 2010/242)
- The Double Taxation Relief and International Tax Enforcement (Libya) Order (SI 2010/243)
- The Pitcairn Constitution Order (SI 2010/244)
- The National Assembly for Wales (Legislative Competence) (Welsh Language) Order (SI 2010/245)
- The British Nationality (Rwanda) Order (SI 2010/246)
- The Education (Chief Inspector of Education and Training in Wales) Order (SI 2010/247)
- The National Assembly for Wales (Legislative Competence) (Environment) Order (SI 2010/248)
- The Atomic Weapons Establishment (AWE) Burghfield Byelaws (SI 2010/249)
- The Warehousekeepers and Owners of Warehoused Goods (Amendment) Regulations (SI 2010/250)
- The M3 Motorway (Junction 4A, Eastbound Exit Slip Road) (Temporary Prohibition of Traffic) Order (SI 2010/251)
- The A3 Trunk Road (Wisley Common) (Temporary Prohibition of Traffic) Order (SI 2010/252)
- The M2 Motorway (Junctions 6 – 7) (Temporary Restriction and Prohibition of Traffic) Order (SI 2010/253)
- The A34 Trunk Road (South Hinksey, Northbound) (Temporary Prohibition of Traffic) Order (SI 2010/254)
- The M60 Motorway (Junction 13 Clockwise Entry Slip Road) (Temporary Prohibition of Traffic) Order (SI 2010/255)
- The M60 Motorway (Junction 11 Clockwise Entry Slip Road) (Temporary Prohibition of Traffic) Order (SI 2010/256)
- The A2 Trunk Road (Harbledown Interchange, Londonbound) (Temporary Speed Restrictions) Order (SI 2010/257)
- The A1(M) Motorway and the A1 Trunk Road (Junction 34 to Junction 35) (Temporary Prohibition of Traffic) Order (SI 2010/258)
- The A63 Trunk Road (Priory Way Interchange) (Temporary Prohibition of Traffic) Order (SI 2010/259)
- The A1 Trunk Road (Laybys between Redhouse Interchange and Darrington Interchange) (Temporary Prohibition of Traffic) Order (SI 2010/260)
- The A12 Trunk Road (Junction 11 Brook Street Interchange to Junction 12 Marylands Interchange, Brentwood, Essex) (Temporary Prohibition of Traffic) Order (SI 2010/261)
- The A12 Trunk Road (Junction 12 Marylands Interchange to Junction 13 Trueloves Interchange, North of Brentwood, Essex) (Temporary Restriction and Prohibition of Traffic) Order (SI 2010/262)
- The A34 Trunk Road (Westminster Way, Access Roads) (Temporary Prohibition of Traffic) Order (SI 2010/263)
- The A64 Trunk Road (West Heslerton to East Heslerton) (Temporary Restriction and Prohibition of Traffic) Order (SI 2010/264)
- The Mercury Export and Data (Enforcement) Regulations (SI 2010/265)
- The M18 Motorway (Junction 2 to Junction 3) (Temporary 50 Miles Per Hour Speed Restriction) Order (SI 2010/266)
- The A35 Trunk Road (Chideock to Symondsbury, Dorset) (Temporary Prohibition and Restriction of Traffic) Order (SI 2010/267)
- The A38 Trunk Road (Lower Dean to Dart Cross Junction, Devon) (Temporary Prohibition and Restriction of Traffic) Order (SI 2010/268)
- The Scallop Fishing (Wales) (2) Order (SI 2010/269)
- The Poultry Compartments (Fees) (England) Order (SI 2010/270)
- The Non-Domestic Rating (Demand Notices) (Wales) (Amendment) Regulations (SI 2010/271)
- The Non-Domestic Rating (Unoccupied Property) (Wales) (Amendment) Regulations (SI 2010/272)
- The Non-Domestic Rating (Small Business Relief) (Wales) (Amendment) Order (SI 2010/273)
- The A38 Trunk Road (Drumbridges Junction to Goodstone Overbridge, Devon) (Temporary Prohibition and Restriction of Traffic) Order (SI 2010/274)
- The Electoral Administration Act 2006 (Commencement 1 and Saving Provision) (Scotland) Order (SI 2010/275)
- The Corporate Manslaughter and Corporate Homicide Act 2007 (Commencement 2) Order (SI 2010/276)
- The Overhead Lines (Exempt Installations) Order (SI 2010/277)
- The Representation of the People (Northern Ireland) (Amendment) Regulations (SI 2010/278)
- The National Health Service (Quality Accounts) Regulations (SI 2010/279)
- The M11 Motorway (Junctions 7 – 8, Essex) (Temporary Restriction and Prohibition of Traffic) Order (SI 2010/280)
- The M4 Motorway (Junctions 8/9 – 7, Eastbound) (Temporary Prohibition of Traffic) Order (SI 2010/281)
- The Communications Act 2003 (Disclosure of Information) Order (SI 2010/282)
- The Personal Injuries (Civilians) Scheme (Amendment) Order (SI 2010/283)
- The M6 Motorway (Junctions 8 to 10A) (Actively Managed Hard Shoulder and Variable Speed Limits) Regulations (SI 2010/284)
- The Asian Development Bank (Further Payments to Capital Stock) Order (SI 2010/285)
- The A20 Trunk Road (Woolcomber Street) (Temporary Prohibition of Traffic) Order (SI 2010/286)
- The M25 Motorway, the M4 Motorway and the M40 Motorway (M25 Junctions 15 – 16) (Temporary Restriction and Prohibition of Traffic) Order (SI 2010/287)
- The Community Health Councils (Constitution, Membership and Procedures) (Wales) Regulations (SI 2010/288)
- The Community Health Councils (Establishment, Transfer of Functions and Abolition) (Wales) Order (SI 2010/289)
- The Education (National Curriculum) (Key Stage 2 Assessment Arrangements) (England) (Amendment) Order (SI 2010/290)
- The National Savings Bank (Amendment of Obligation of Secrecy Provisions) Regulations (SI 2010/291)
- The Learning and Skills Council for England (Strategy for Greater Manchester) Order (SI 2010/292)
- The Welfare Reform Act 2009 (Commencement 2 and Transitory Provision) Order (SI 2010/293)
- The Authorised Investment Funds (Tax) (Amendment) Regulations (SI 2010/294)
- The Food for Particular Nutritional Uses (Miscellaneous Amendments) (England) Regulations (SI 2010/295)
- The A11 and A14 Trunk Roads (Cambridge to Felixstowe) (Temporary Restriction and Prohibition of Traffic) Variation Order (SI 2010/296)
- The Housing Renewal Grants (Amendment) (Wales) Regulations (SI 2010/297)
- The Marine and Coastal Access Act 2009 (Commencement 2 and Transitional Provisions) Order (SI 2010/298)
- The Pharmacy Order 2010 (Commencement 1) Order of Council (SI 2010/299)
- The General Pharmaceutical Council (Constitution) Order (SI 2010/300)

== 301–400 ==
- The Local Authority (Duty to Secure Early Years Provision Free of Charge) (Amendment) Regulations (SI 2010/301)
- The School Admissions Code (Appointed Day) (England) Order (SI 2010/302)
- The Apprenticeships, Skills, Children and Learning Act 2009 (Commencement 2 and Transitional and Saving Provisions) Order (SI 2010/303)
- The Deposits in the Sea (Exemptions) (Amendment) (England and Wales) Order (SI 2010/304)
- The Infrastructure Planning (Decisions) Regulations (SI 2010/305)
- The NHS Foundation Trusts (Trust Funds: Appointment of Trustees) Amendment Order (SI 2010/306)
- The Childcare (Fees) (Amendment) Regulations (SI 2010/307)
- The Buckinghamshire Hospitals National Health Service Trust (Trust Funds: Appointment of Trustees) Order (SI 2010/310)
- The Road Vehicles (Construction and Use) (Amendment) Regulations (SI 2010/312)
- The Motor Vehicles (Designation of Approval Marks) (Amendment) Regulations (SI 2010/313)
- The Local Authorities (Alteration of Requisite Calculations) (Wales) Regulations (SI 2010/317)
- The M2 Motorway (Junctions 5 – 6) (Temporary Restriction of Traffic) Order (SI 2010/318)
- The Port Security (Avonmouth Dock and Royal Portbury Dock and Port of Bristol Security Authority) Designation Order (SI 2010/319)
- The Planning and Compulsory Purchase Act 2004 (Commencement 12, Revocation and Amendment) Order (SI 2010/321)
- The A3 Trunk Road (Ripley – Compton) (Temporary Prohibition of Traffic) Order (SI 2010/322)
- The Merchant Shipping and Fishing Vessels (Health and Safety at Work) (Biological Agents) Regulations (SI 2010/323)
- The Goods Infringing Intellectual Property Rights (Customs) (Amendment) Regulations (SI 2010/324)
- The A1(M) Motorway (Junction 56 to Junction 57) and the A66(M) Motorway (Temporary Restriction and Prohibition of Traffic) Order (SI 2010/325)
- The M48 Motorway (Severn Bridge) (Temporary Restriction of Traffic) Order (SI 2010/327)
- The A30 Trunk Road (Launceston Exit Slip Roads, Cornwall) (Temporary Prohibition of Traffic) Order (SI 2010/328)
- The A38 Trunk Road (Lee Mill, Near Ivybridge, to Voss Farm, Near Plymouth, Devon) (Temporary Prohibition and Restriction of Traffic) Order (SI 2010/329)
- The Merchant Shipping and Fishing Vessels (Health and Safety at Work) (Chemical Agents) Regulations (SI 2010/330)
- The A40 Trunk Road (Forest Gate, Huntley, Gloucestershire) (Temporary Restriction of Traffic) Order (SI 2010/331)
- The Merchant Shipping and Fishing Vessels (Health and Safety at Work) (Work at Height) Regulations (SI 2010/332)
- The Notification of Conventional Tower Cranes Regulations (SI 2010/333)
- The A590 Trunk Road (East of New Pool Bridge) (Temporary Prohibition and Restriction of Traffic) Order (SI 2010/334)
- The A19 Trunk Road (Moor Farm Roundabout to Killingworth Interchange) (Temporary Restriction and Prohibition of Traffic) Order (SI 2010/335)
- The M65 Motorway (Junction 8) and A56 Trunk Road (Temporary Prohibition and Restriction of Traffic) Order (SI 2010/336)
- The A12 Trunk Road (Lowestoft, Suffolk) (Temporary Restriction and Prohibition of Traffic) Order (SI 2010/337)
- he A5 Trunk Road (Near Atherstone, Warwickshire) (Temporary Restriction and Prohibition of Traffic) Ord (SI 2010/338)
- he A46 Trunk Road and the M6 and M69 Motorways (M6 Junction 2, Warwickshire) (Temporary Restriction and Prohibition of Traffic) Ord (SI 2010/339)
- The Environmental Noise (England) (Amendment) Regulations (SI 2010/340)
- The Disability Discrimination Act 2005 (Commencement 4) Order (SI 2010/341)
- The A12 Trunk Road (Junction 32B Bentley Longwood Interchange, Suffolk) (Temporary Restriction and Prohibition of Traffic) Order (SI 2010/342)
- The A1 Trunk Road (Various Layby Closures between Radwell in Hertfordshire and North of Brampton in Cambridgeshire) (Temporary Prohibition of Traffic) Order (SI 2010/343)
- The Schools Forums (England) Regulations (SI 2010/344)
- The Armed Forces (Redundancy, Resettlement and Gratuity Earnings Schemes) Order (SI 2010/345)
- The A27 Trunk Road (Holmbush Interchange, Westbound) (Temporary Restriction and Prohibition of Traffic) Order (SI 2010/346)
- The A38 Trunk Road (Dobwalls to Carminow Cross, Bodmin) (40 & 50 Mph Speed Limit) Order 2003 (Variation) and (Twelvewoods Roundabout, Dobwalls) (De-Restriction) Order (SI 2010/347)
- The A3(M) Motorway and the A27 Trunk Road (Bedhampton/Broad Marsh Interchange) (Temporary Restriction and Prohibition of Traffic) Order (SI 2010/348)
- The Community Task Force (Miscellaneous Provisions) Order (SI 2010/349)
- The A14 Trunk Road (Various Layby Closures, Thrapston and Titchmarsh, Northamptonshire and Huntingdon, Cambridgeshire) (Temporary Prohibition of Traffic) Order (SI 2010/350)
- The A259 Trunk Road (Glyne Gap – Little Common) (Temporary Restriction and Prohibition of Traffic) Order (SI 2010/351)
- The A20 Trunk Road and the M20 Motorway (Roundhill Tunnel) (Temporary 50 Miles Per Hour Speed Restriction) Order (SI 2010/352)
- The M4 Motorway (Junctions 14 – 15) (Temporary Restriction and Prohibition of Traffic) Order (SI 2010/353)
- The Social Security (Community Task Force) Regulations (SI 2010/354)
- The A2 Trunk Road (Harbledown Interchange – Honey Wood Interchange) (Temporary Restriction and Prohibition of Traffic) Order (SI 2010/355)
- The A14 Trunk Road (St. Saviours Interchange to New Road Overbridge, Bury St. Edmunds, Suffolk) (Temporary Restriction and Prohibition of Traffic) Order (SI 2010/356)
- The A259 Trunk Road (East Guldeford – Brookland) (Temporary Restriction and Prohibition of Traffic) Order (SI 2010/357)
- The Police and Criminal Evidence Act 1984 (Application to Revenue and Customs) Order 2007 (Amendment) Order (SI 2010/360)
- The M62 Motorway (Junction 11–12, Westbound Carriageway) (Temporary Restriction of Traffic) Supplementary Order (SI 2010/361)
- The A259 Trunk Road (Harbour Road Junction – Rye Marsh Farm Junction) (Temporary Speed Restrictions) Order (SI 2010/362)
- The Food for Particular Nutritional Uses (Miscellaneous Amendments) (Wales) Regulations (SI 2010/363)
- The Export Control (Guinea) Order (SI 2010/364)
- The A419 Trunk Road (Commonhead Roundabout, Swindon) (Temporary Prohibition of Traffic) Order (SI 2010/365)
- The A38 Trunk Road (Glynn Valley, Near Bodmin) (Temporary Prohibition and Restriction of Traffic) Order (SI 2010/366)
- The A417 Trunk Road (Brockworth Roundabout, Gloucester, to Crickley Hill) (Temporary Prohibition and Restriction of Traffic) Order (SI 2010/367)
- The A64 Trunk Road (Laybys at Sand Hutton and West Knapton) (Temporary Prohibition of Traffic) Order (SI 2010/368)
- The A1 Trunk Road (Tweedmouthmoor to Letham Shank) (Temporary Restriction and Prohibition of Traffic) Order (SI 2010/369)
- The A1(M) Motorway (Junction 59 to Junction 60) (Temporary Prohibition of Traffic) Order (SI 2010/370)
- The A57/A628 Trunk Roads (Gun Inn Junction, Hollingworth) (Temporary Prohibition of Traffic and Pedestrians) Order (SI 2010/371)
- The A64 Trunk Road (Whitwell-on-the-Hill to Welburn Crossroads) (Temporary Prohibition of Traffic) Order (SI 2010/372)
- The A616 Trunk Road (The A6102 Deepcar Junction) (Temporary Prohibition of Traffic) Order (SI 2010/373)
- The M4 Motorway (Junctions 16–17) (Temporary Prohibition and Restriction of Traffic) Order (SI 2010/374)
- The M5 Motorway (Junction 11A Northbound Entry Slip Road) (Temporary Prohibition of Traffic) Order (SI 2010/375)
- The A40 Trunk Road (M5 Junction 11 Roundabout – Golden Valley Interchange) (Temporary Prohibition of Traffic) Order (SI 2010/376)
- The A500 Trunk Road (Stoke-on-Trent and Newcastle-under-Lyme) (Temporary Restriction and Prohibition of Traffic) Order (SI 2010/377)
- The A46 Trunk Road (Beckford to Sedgeberrow, Worcestershire) (Temporary 10 Miles Per Hour and 40 Miles Per Hour Speed Restriction) Order (SI 2010/378)
- The A46 Trunk Road (Warwick to Stoneleigh) (Temporary Prohibition of Traffic) Order (SI 2010/379)
- The M50 Motorway (Junction 3, Gorsley Common, Herefordshire) (Temporary Restriction of Traffic) Order (SI 2010/380)
- The A483 Trunk Road (Pant to Llynclys, Shropshire) (Temporary Restriction and Prohibition of Traffic) Order (SI 2010/381)
- The M5 Motorway (Junction 1, Sandwell) (Slip Road) (Temporary Prohibition of Traffic) Order (SI 2010/382)
- The Animal Welfare (Codes of Practice) (Appointed Day) (England) Order (SI 2010/383)
- The Air Navigation (Restriction of Flying) (West Wales Airport) Regulations 2010 (SI 2010/384)
- The Social Security (Credits) (Amendment) Regulations (SI 2010/385)
- The A49 Trunk Road (Wellington, Herefordshire) (Temporary 40 Miles Per Hour and 10 Miles Per Hour Speed Restriction) Order (SI 2010/387)
- The M5 Motorway (Junction 2, Sandwell) (Slip Road) (Temporary Prohibition of Traffic) Order (SI 2010/388)
- The A1 Trunk Road (Long Bennington to Foston, Lincolnshire) (Temporary Prohibition of Traffic in Laybys) Order (SI 2010/389)
- The A52 Trunk Road (East of Bingham, Nottinghamshire) (Temporary Restriction and Prohibition of Traffic) Order (SI 2010/390)
- The M5 Motorway (Junctions 8 to 7, Worcestershire) (Temporary Prohibition of Traffic) Order (SI 2010/391)
- The M42 Motorway (Junction 3a, Warwickshire) (Temporary Prohibition of Traffic) Order (SI 2010/392)
- The A46 Trunk Road (Evesham Bypass) (Temporary Restriction and Prohibition of Traffic) Order (SI 2010/393)
- The M5 Motorway (Junctions 5 to 6) (Temporary Restriction and Prohibition of Traffic) Order (SI 2010/394)
- The A500 Trunk Road (Stoke-on-Trent, Staffordshire) (Temporary Prohibition of Traffic) Order (SI 2010/395)
- The A46 Trunk Road and the M5 Motorway (Ashchurch to M5 Junction 9) (Temporary Restriction and Prohibition of Traffic) Order (SI 2010/396)
- The A42 Trunk Road (Between M42 Junction 11 and M1 Junction 23a) (Temporary Restriction and Prohibition of Traffic) Order (SI 2010/397)
- The A5 Trunk Road (Paulerspury to Towcester) (Temporary Restriction and Prohibition of Traffic) Order (SI 2010/398)
- The A1 Trunk Road (West of Stamford) (Temporary Restriction and Prohibition of Traffic) Order (SI 2010/399)
- The A45 Trunk Road and the M1 Motorway (M1 Junction 15) (Temporary Prohibition of Traffic) Order (SI 2010/400)

== 401–500 ==
- The M6 Motorway (Junctions 42–44 Northbound and Southbound Carriageways and Junction 43 Slip Roads) and A69 Trunk Road (Temporary Prohibition and Restriction of Traffic) Order 2010 (SI 2010/401)
- The Railways (Public Service Obligations) Regulations 2010 (SI 2010/402)
- The Business Rate Supplements (Accounting) (England) Regulations 2010 (SI 2010/403)
- The Building (Local Authority Charges) Regulations 2010 (SI 2010/404)
- The National Health Service (Functions of Strategic Health Authorities and Primary Care Trusts and Administration Arrangements) (England) (Amendment) Regulations 2010 (SI 2010/405)
- The Car and Van Fuel Benefit Order 2010 (SI 2010/406)
- The Stamp Duty Land Tax Avoidance Schemes (Prescribed Descriptions of Arrangements) (Amendment) Regulations 2010 (SI 2010/407)
- The Non-Domestic Rating (Unoccupied Property) (England) (Amendment) Regulations 2010 (SI 2010/408)
- Finance Act 2008, Schedule 38 (Appointed Day) Order 2010 (SI 2010/409)
- The Tax Avoidance Schemes (Information) (Amendment) Regulations 2010 (SI 2010/410)
- The Electricity (Exemption from the Requirement for a Generation Licence) (Keadby) (England and Wales) Order 2010 (SI 2010/411)
- The National Health Service (Performers Lists) Amendment Regulations 2010 (SI 2010/412)
- The Electricity (Exemption from the Requirement for a Generation Licence) (Millennium and Kilbraur) (Scotland) Order 2010 (SI 2010/413)
- [[Police and Justice Act 2006] (Commencement No. 13) Order 2010]] (SI 2010/414)
- The Taxes (Interest Rate) (Amendment) Regulations (SI 2010/415)
- The Taxation of Chargeable Gains (Gilt-edged Securities) Order 2010 (SI 2010/416)
- The Buckinghamshire Hospitals National Health Service Trust (Trust Funds: Appointment of Trustees) Revocation Order 2010 (SI 2010/417)
- The Police Authorities (Particular Functions and Transitional Provisions) (Amendment) Order 2010 (SI 2010/418)
- The Audiovisual Media Services Regulations 2010 (SI 2010/419)
- The Fish Labelling (England) Regulations 2010 (SI 2010/420)
- The Police Authority (Community Engagement and Membership) Regulations 2010 (SI 2010/421)
- The Policing Plan (Amendment) Regulations 2010 (SI 2010/422)
- The National Health Service (Strategic Health Authorities: Further Duty to Involve Users) Regulations 2010 (SI 2010/423)
- Welfare Reform Act 2009 (Section 26) (Consequential Amendments) Regulations 2010 (SI 2010/424)
- The NHS Professionals Special Health Authority (Abolition) Order 2010 (SI 2010/425)
- The Social Security (Maximum Additional Pension) Regulations 2010 (SI 2010/426)
- The Rail Vehicle Accessibility (Applications for Exemption Orders) Regulations 2010 (SI 2010/427)
- The Welsh Ministers (Transfer of Fire and Rescue Service Equipment) Order 2010 (SI 2010/428)
- The Special Annual Allowance Charge (Protected Pension Input Amounts) Order 2010 (SI 2010/429)
- Severn Bridges (Amendment) Regulations 2010 (SI 2010/430)
- The Police Pensions (Amendment) Regulations 2010 (SI 2010/431)
- The Rail Vehicle Accessibility (Non-Interoperable Rail System) Regulations 2010 (SI 2010/432)
- The Natural Mineral Water, Spring Water and Bottled Drinking Water (England) (Amendment) Regulations 2010 (SI 2010/433)
- The Healthy Start Scheme and Welfare Food (Amendment) Regulations 2010 (SI 2010/434)
- The Rail Vehicle Accessibility (London Underground Metropolitan Line S8 Vehicles) Exemption Order 2010 (SI 2010/435)
- The Trade Union Ballots and Elections (Independent Scrutineer Qualifications) (Amendment) Order 2010 (SI 2010/436)
- The Recognition and Derecognition Ballots (Qualified Persons) (Amendment) Order 2010 (SI 2010/437)
- The Passengers' Council (Non-Railway Functions) Order 2010 (SI 2010/439)
- The Registration of Civil Partnerships (Fees) (Amendment) Order 2010 (SI 2010/440)
- The Registration of Births, Deaths and Marriages (Fees) Order 2010 (SI 2010/441)
- The Social Security (Persons Serving a Sentence of Imprisonment Detained in Hospital) Regulations 2010 (SI 2010/442)
- Pensions Act 2004 (Commencement No. 14) Order 2010 (SI 2010/443)
- The Social Security (Notification of Changes of Circumstances) Regulations 2010 (SI 2010/444)
- The Tobacco Advertising and Promotion (Display) (England) Regulations 2010 (SI 2010/445)
- The Tobacco Advertising and Promotion (Specialist Tobacconists) (England) Regulations 2010 (SI 2010/446)
- The Education (Student Support) (European University Institute) Regulations 2010 (SI 2010/447)
- The Goods Vehicles (Plating and Testing) (Amendment) Regulations 2010 (SI 2010/448)
- The Motor Vehicles (Tests) (Amendment) Regulations 2010 (SI 2010/449)
- The Planning (Hazardous Substances) (Amendment) (Wales) Regulations 2010 (SI 2010/450)
- The Road Vehicles (Registration and Licensing) (Amendment) Regulations 2010 (SI 2010/451)
- The Public Service Vehicles (Operators' Licences) (Amendment) Regulations 2010 (SI 2010/452)
- The Home Energy Efficiency Schemes (Wales) (Amendment) Regulations 2010 (SI 2010/453)
- The Local Authorities (Capital Finance and Accounting) (Amendment) (England) Regulations 2010 (SI 2010/454)
- The Goods Vehicles (Licensing of Operators) (Amendment) Regulations 2010 (SI 2010/455)
- The Central Rating List (England) (Amendment) Regulations 2010 (SI 2010/456)
- The Public Service Vehicles (Operators' Licences) (Fees) (Amendment) Regulations 2010 (SI 2010/457)
- The London Skills and Employment Board (Specified Functions) Order 2010 (SI 2010/458)
- The Travel Concessions (Eligibility) (England) Order 2010 (SI 2010/459)
- The Animal Gatherings Order 2010 (SI 2010/460)
- The Regulation of Investigatory Powers (Extension of Authorisation Provisions: Legal Consultations) Order (SI 2010/461)
- The Regulation of Investigatory Powers (Covert Human Intelligence Sources: Code of Practice) Order (SI 2010/462)
- The Regulation of Investigatory Powers (Covert Surveillance and Property Interference: Code of Practice) Order (SI 2010/463)
- The Goods Vehicles (Licensing of Operators) (Fees) (Amendment) Regulations (SI 2010/464)
- The Adoption Support Agencies (England) (Amendment) Regulations (SI 2010/465)
- Finance Act 2009, Schedule 56 (Appointed Day and Consequential Provisions) Order 2010 (SI 2010/466)
- Pensions Act 2008 (Commencement No. 6) Order 2010 (SI 2010/467)
- Social Security Pensions (Low Earnings Threshold) Order 2010 (SI 2010/468)
- Violent Crime Reduction Act 2006 (Commencement No. 8) Order 2010 (SI 2010/469)
- The Social Security Revaluation of Earnings Factors Order (SI 2010/470)
- The Fire Safety (Employees' Capabilities) (England) Regulations (SI 2010/471)
- The Town and Country Planning (Fees for Applications and Deemed Applications) (Amendment) (England) Regulations (SI 2010/472)
- The Postgraduate Medical Education and Training Order of Council (SI 2010/473)
- The General Medical Council (Constitution of Panels and Investigation Committee) (Amendment) Rules Order of Council (SI 2010/474)
- The General Medical Council (Applications for General Practice and Specialist Registration) Regulations Order of Council (SI 2010/475)
- The General Medical Council (Registration Appeals Panels Procedure) Rules Order of Council (SI 2010/476)
- The General Medical Council (Marking of the General Practitioner Register) Regulations Order of Council (SI 2010/477)
- The General and Specialist Medical Practice (Education, Training and Qualifications) Order 2010 (Commencement 1) Order of Council (SI 2010/478)
- The Health Professions Council (Registration and Fees) (Amendment) Rules Order of Council (SI 2010/479)
- The Regulation of Investigatory Powers (Communications Data) Order (SI 2010/480)
- The Fire and Rescue Authorities (Improvement Plans) (Wales) Order (SI 2010/481)
- The Local Government (Performance Indicators and Standards) (Wales) Order (SI 2010/482)
- The Occupational Pension Schemes (Fraud Compensation Payments and Miscellaneous Amendments) (Amendment) Regulations (SI 2010/483)
- The Value Added Tax (Buildings and Land) Order (SI 2010/485)
- The Value Added Tax (Construction of Buildings) Order (SI 2010/486)
- The Nitrate Pollution Prevention (Wales) (Amendment) Regulations (SI 2010/489)
- The Conservation of Habitats and Species Regulations (SI 2010/490)
- The Offshore Marine Conservation (Natural Habitats, &c.) (Amendment) Regulations (SI 2010/491)
- The National Health Service Pension Scheme, Injury Benefits and Additional Voluntary Contributions (Amendment) Regulations (SI 2010/492)
- Employment Relations Act 1999 (Blacklists) Regulations 2010 (SI 2010/493)
- Work and Families Act 2006 (Commencement No. 4) Order 2010 (SI 2010/495)
- The Care Quality Commission (Specified Organisations etc.) Order (SI 2010/496)
- South Downs National Park Authority (Establishment) Order 2010 (SI 2010/497)
- The Town and Country Planning (Blight Provisions) (England) Order (SI 2010/498)
- The Occupational and Personal Pension Schemes (Miscellaneous Amendments) Regulations (SI 2010/499)
- Charities Act 2006 (Changes in Exempt Charities) Order 2010 (SI 2010/500)

== 501–600 ==
- The Charities Act 2006 (Principal Regulators of Exempt Charities) Regulations (SI 2010/501)
- The Charities (Exception from Registration) Regulations (SI 2010/502)
- The Charities Act 2006 (Commencement 7, Transitional and Transitory Provisions and Savings) Order (SI 2010/503)
- The Lowestoft Sixth Form College (Incorporation) Order (SI 2010/504)
- The Lowestoft Sixth Form College (Government) Regulations (SI 2010/505)
- The Occupational Pension Schemes (Contracting-out) (Amount Required for Restoring State Scheme Rights) Amendment Regulations (SI 2010/506)
- The Policing and Crime Act 2009 (Commencement 4) Order (SI 2010/507)
- The Social Security (Claims and Information) (Amendment) Regulations (SI 2010/508)
- The Jobseeker's Allowance (Sanctions for Failure to Attend) Regulations (SI 2010/509)
- The Social Security (Miscellaneous Amendments) Regulations (SI 2010/510)
- The M60 Motorway (Junction 17 Clockwise and Anticlockwise Entry Slip Roads) (Temporary Prohibition of Traffic) Order (SI 2010/511)
- The M62 Motorway (Junction 30, Rothwell) (Temporary Prohibition of Traffic) Order (SI 2010/512)
- The A12 Trunk Road (Breydon Bridge, Pasteur Road Roundabout to Vauxhall Roundabout, Great Yarmouth, Norfolk) (Temporary Restriction and Prohibition of Traffic) Order (SI 2010/513)
- The M61 Motorway (Entry Slip Road to M61 Northbound from A580 Westbound) (Temporary Prohibition of Traffic) Order (SI 2010/514)
- The A40 Trunk Road (Longford to Huntley, Gloucestershire) (40 mph and 50 mph Speed Limit) Order 2007 (Variation) Order (SI 2010/515)
- The Government Resources and Accounts Act 2000 (Commencement 2 and Transitional Provision) Order (SI 2010/516)
- The A34 Trunk Road (Botley – Kidlington) (Temporary Restriction and Prohibition of Traffic) Order 2008 Variation Order (SI 2010/517)
- The A21 Trunk Road (Marley Lane, Near Battle) (Temporary Restriction and Prohibition of Traffic) Order (SI 2010/518)
- The M4 Motorway (Junction 13, Westbound Exit Slip Road) (Temporary Prohibition of Traffic) Order (SI 2010/519)
- The A40 Trunk Road (Huntley, Gloucestershire) (Restriction) Order 2003 (Variation) Order (SI 2010/520)
- The Regulation of Investigatory Powers (Directed Surveillance and Covert Human Intelligence Sources) Order (SI 2010/521)
- The A27 Trunk Road (Gainsborough Lane) (Temporary Prohibition of Traffic) Order (SI 2010/522)
- The A259 Trunk Road (Winchelsea Road, Guestling Green) (Temporary 40 Miles Per Hour Speed Restriction) Order (SI 2010/523)
- The A21 Trunk Road (Pembury Road Interchange, Slip Roads) (Temporary Prohibition of Traffic) Order (SI 2010/524)
- The M25 Motorway and the A282 Trunk Road (Junctions 30 – 31, Clockwise) (Temporary 50 Miles Per Hour Speed Restriction) Order (SI 2010/525)
- The A421 Trunk Road (A603 Cardington Road Interchange to A428 St. Neots Road Interchange, Bedford Southern Bypass, Bedfordshire) (Temporary Prohibition of Traffic) Order (SI 2010/526)
- The Qualifications and Curriculum Development Agency's Remit Order (SI 2010/527)
- The Local Government Pension Scheme (Amendment) Regulations (SI 2010/528)
- The Pension Schemes (Transfers, Reorganisations and Winding Up) (Transitional Provisions) (Amendment) Order (SI 2010/529)
- The Finance Act 2008 (Penalties for Errors and Failure to Notify etc.) (Consequential Amendments) Order (SI 2010/530)
- The A64 Trunk Road (High Hutton to Malton) (Temporary Restriction and Prohibition of Traffic) Order (SI 2010/531)
- The Census (England) Regulations (SI 2010/532)
- The A64 Trunk Road (High Street, Sherburn) (Temporary Restriction and Prohibition of Traffic) Order (SI 2010/533)
- The Food Hygiene (England) (Amendment) Regulations (SI 2010/534)
- The A1 Trunk Road (New Mousen to Belford) (Temporary Restriction and Prohibition of Traffic) Order (SI 2010/535)
- The Taxation of Pensions Schemes (Rates, etc.) Order (SI 2010/536)
- The A1 Trunk Road (Leases Lane to Manor House Bridge) (Temporary 40 Miles Per Hour Speed Restriction) Order (SI 2010/537)
- The A1 Trunk Road (Deanmoor to Charlton Mires) (Temporary Restriction and Prohibition of Traffic) Order (SI 2010/538)
- The A1 Trunk Road and the A19 Trunk Road (Seaton Burn Interchange) (Temporary Restriction and Prohibition of Traffic) Order (SI 2010/539)
- The Common Agricultural Policy Single Payment and Support Schemes Regulations (SI 2010/540)
- The M23 Motorway (Junctions 8 – 9) (Temporary Restriction of Traffic) Order (SI 2010/541)
- The A2 Trunk Road (Dunkirk Interchange) (Temporary Speed Restriction) Order (SI 2010/542)
- The Welfare of Racing Greyhounds Regulations (SI 2010/543)
- The M23 Motorway (Junctions 9A – 9) (Temporary Restriction and Prohibition of Traffic) Order (SI 2010/544)
- The M62 Motorway (Junction 7 Eastbound Exit Slip Road) (Temporary Prohibition of Traffic) Order (SI 2010/545)
- The A35 Trunk Road (Gammons Hill, Kilmington, Devon) (50 mph Speed Limit) Order (SI 2010/546)
- The M6 Motorway (Junction 1 – M1 Junction 19) (Temporary Prohibition of Traffic) Order (SI 2010/547)
- The M42 Motorway (Junction 3a, Warwickshire) (Temporary Prohibition of Traffic) ( 2) Order (SI 2010/548)
- The M60 Motorway (Junction 9 Clockwise Entry Slip Road) (Temporary Prohibition of Traffic) Order (SI 2010/549)
- The A40 Trunk Road (Churcham, Gloucestershire) (Temporary Prohibition and Restriction of Traffic) Order (SI 2010/550)
- The Medicines (Products for Human Use) (Fees) Regulations (SI 2010/551)
- The M48 Motorway (Junction 1) (Temporary Prohibition of Traffic) Order (SI 2010/552)
- The A40 Trunk Road (Highnam Woods, Gloucestershire) (Temporary Prohibition and Restriction of Traffic) Order (SI 2010/553)
- The Blood Safety and Quality (Fees Amendment) Regulations (SI 2010/554)
- The A38 Trunk Road (Near Holbrook, Derbyshire) (Link Roads) (Temporary Prohibition of Traffic) Order (SI 2010/555)
- The A52 Trunk Road (West of Sedgebrook) (Temporary Prohibition of Traffic in Layby) Order (SI 2010/556)
- The Medical Devices (Fees Amendment) Regulations (SI 2010/557)
- The Access to the Countryside (Coastal Margin) (England) Order (SI 2010/558)
- The Value Added Tax (Amendment) Regulations (SI 2010/559)
- The Pension Protection Fund (Miscellaneous Amendments) Regulations (SI 2010/560)
- The Asylum (Designated States) Order (SI 2010/561)
- The Coleg Meirion-Dwyfor Further Education Corporation (Dissolution) Order (SI 2010/562)
- The Social Security (Work-focused Interviews etc.) (Equalisation of State Pension Age) Amendment Regulations (SI 2010/563)
- The Coroners (Amendment) Rules (SI 2010/564)
- The M27 Motorway (Junctions 4 – 8, Carriageways) (Temporary Restriction of Traffic) Order (SI 2010/565)
- The Planning Act 2008 (Commencement 5 and Saving) Order (SI 2010/566)
- The Town and Country Planning (General Development Procedure) (Amendment) (England) Order (SI 2010/567)
- The Planning (Listed Buildings and Conservation Areas) (Amendment) (England) Regulations (SI 2010/568)
- The Town and Country Planning (London Borough of Camden) Special Development (Amendment and Revocation) Order (SI 2010/569)
- The Whole of Government Accounts (Specified Dates) Order (SI 2010/570)
- The National Health Service Trusts (Originating Capital) Order (SI 2010/571)
- The Special Annual Allowance Charge (Variation of Rate) Order (SI 2010/572)
- The Chief Executive of Skills Funding (Strategy for Greater Manchester) Order (SI 2010/573)
- The Finance Act 2009, Section 94 (Appointed Day) Order (SI 2010/574)
- The Policing of Aerodromes (Belfast International Airport) Order (SI 2010/575)
- The Smoke Control Areas (Authorised Fuels) (England) (Amendment) Regulations (SI 2010/576)
- The Smoke Control Areas (Exempted Fireplaces) (England) Order (SI 2010/577)
- The National Health Service (Primary Medical Services) (Miscellaneous Amendments) Regulations (SI 2010/578)
- The Health and Safety (Fees) Regulations (SI 2010/579)
- The Veterinary Surgery (Vaccination of Badgers Against Tuberculosis) Order (SI 2010/580)
- The Registered Pension Schemes (Provision of Information) (Amendment) Regulations (SI 2010/581)
- The Child Trust Funds (Amendment) Regulations (SI 2010/582)
- The M42 Motorway (Junction 4, Solihull) (Northbound Entry Slip Road) (Temporary Prohibition of Traffic) Order (SI 2010/583)
- The Football Spectators (Prescription) (Amendment) Order (SI 2010/584)
- The A446 Trunk Road (M42 Junction 9, Warwickshire) (Temporary 10 Miles Per Hour Speed Restriction) Order (SI 2010/585)
- The M42 Motorway (Junction 6, Solihull) (Temporary Prohibition of Traffic) Order (SI 2010/586)
- The Environmental Damage (Prevention and Remediation) (Amendment) Regulations (SI 2010/587)
- The Income Tax Act 2007 (Amendment) Order (SI 2010/588)
- The National Health Service Trusts (Trust Funds: Appointment of Trustees) (Amendment) Order (SI 2010/589)
- The Children's Trust Board (Relevant Partners) (Exceptions) (England) Regulations (SI 2010/590)
- The Children's Trust Board (Children and Young People's Plan) (England) Regulations (SI 2010/591)
- The Excise Goods (Sales on Board Ships and Aircraft) (Amendment) Regulations (SI 2010/592)
- The Excise Goods (Holding, Movement and Duty Point) Regulations (SI 2010/593)
- The Channel Tunnel (Alcoholic Liquor and Tobacco Products) Order (SI 2010/594)
- The Norfolk (Coroners’ Districts) Order (SI 2010/595)
- The A1(M) Motorway (County of Durham) (Restriction on Use of Off-side Lanes) (Southbound) Regulations (SI 2010/596)
- The M1 Motorway (Woolley Edge Services To Junction 38) (Temporary Restriction and Prohibition of Traffic) Order (SI 2010/597)
- The Young People's Learning Agency for England (Specified Charges) Regulations (SI 2010/598)
- The Learning and Skills Council for England (Transfer Schemes) (Permitted Transferees) Order (SI 2010/599)
- The Sentencing Council for England and Wales (Supplementary Provisions) Order (SI 2010/600)

== 601–700 ==
- The Town and Country Planning (Regional Strategy) (England) Regulations (SI 2010/601)
- The Local Democracy, Economic Development and Construction Act 2009 (Consequential Amendments) (England) Order (SI 2010/602)
- The Marine Management Organisation (Prescription of Powers to Fix Fees and Charges) Order (SI 2010/603)
- The Education (School Day and School Year) (England) (Amendment) Regulations (SI 2010/604)
- The Magistrates’ Courts (Foreign Travel Orders) (Amendment) Rules (SI 2010/605)
- The UK Borders Act 2007 (Commencement 6) Order (SI 2010/606)
- The Houses in Multiple Occupation (Specified Educational Establishments) (England) Regulations (SI 2010/607)
- The Value Added Tax (Refund of Tax to Museums and Galleries) (Amendment) Order (SI 2010/608)
- The Wildlife and Countryside Act 1981 (Variation of Schedule 9) (England and Wales) Order (SI 2010/609)
- The Field Allowance for New Oil Fields Order (SI 2010/610)
- The Terrorism Act 2000 (Proscribed Organisations) (Amendment) Order (SI 2010/611)
- The Council Tax (Prescribed Classes of Dwellings) (Wales) (Amendment) Regulations (SI 2010/612)
- The Council Tax (Electronic Communications) (Wales) Order (SI 2010/613)
- The Corporation Tax Act 2009 (Amendment) Order (SI 2010/614)
- The Export Control (Uzbekistan) Order (SI 2010/615)
- The Crime and Disorder (Overview and Scrutiny) (Amendment) Regulations (SI 2010/616)
- Her Majesty's Chief Inspector of Education, Children's Services and Skills (Fees and Frequency of Inspections) (Children's Homes etc.) (Amendment) Regulations (SI 2010/617)
- The Animal Health (Divisional Veterinary Managers) (Wales) Order (SI 2010/618)
- The Animals (Divisional Veterinary Managers) (Wales) Regulations (SI 2010/619)
- The National Health Service (Travel Expenses and Remission of Charges) Amendment Regulations (SI 2010/620)
- The Civil Procedure (Amendment) Rules (SI 2010/621)
- The Local Safeguarding Children Boards (Amendment) Regulations (SI 2010/622)
- The South Kent College, Folkestone (Dissolution) Order (SI 2010/623)
- The Initial Sixth Form College Corporation Designation (England) Order (SI 2010/624)
- The Specified Sixth Form College Corporation Order (SI 2010/625)
- The Harwich Parkeston Quay Harbour Revision Order (SI 2010/626)
- The A5 Trunk Road (Burntwood, Staffordshire) (Temporary Prohibition of Traffic) Order (SI 2010/627)
- The M42 Motorway (Junction 10, Warwickshire) (Slip Road) (Temporary Prohibition of Traffic) Order (SI 2010/628)
- The Merchant Shipping (Light Dues) (Amendment) Regulations (SI 2010/629)
- The Marine and Coastal Access Act 2009 (Commencement 1, Consequential, Transitional and Savings Provisions) (England and Wales) Order (SI 2010/630)
- The North Western and North Wales Sea Fisheries District (Consequential and Transitional Provisions) Order (SI 2010/631)
- The M6 Motorway (Junction 15, Staffordshire) (Slip Roads) (Temporary Prohibition of Traffic) Order (SI 2010/632)
- The First-tier Tribunal (Gambling) Fees (Amendment) Order (SI 2010/633)
- The National Health Service (Miscellaneous Amendments Relating to Ophthalmic Services) Regulations (SI 2010/634)
- The National Health Service (Standing Advisory Committees) Amendment Order (SI 2010/635)
- The National Health Service (Amendments relating to Optical Charges and Payments) (Wales) Regulations (SI 2010/636)
- The Assembly Learning Grant (Further Education) (Amendment) Regulations (SI 2010/637)
- The Federation of Maintained Schools and Miscellaneous Amendments (Wales) Regulations (SI 2010/638)
- The Water Resources (Control of Pollution) (Silage, Slurry and Agricultural Fuel Oil) (England) Regulations (SI 2010/639)
- The Communications (Television Licensing) (Amendment) Regulations (SI 2010/640)
- The Social Security (Miscellaneous Amendments) ( 2) Regulations (SI 2010/641)
- The Aggregates Levy (General) (Amendment) Regulations (SI 2010/642)
- The Climate Change Levy (General) (Amendment) Regulations (SI 2010/643)
- The Tax Credits Act 2002 (Transitional Provisions) Order (SI 2010/644)
- The Prevention of Terrorism Act 2005 (Continuance in Force of Sections 1 to 9) Order (SI 2010/645)
- The Social Security (Contributions) (Amendment 3) Regulations (SI 2010/646)
- The Crime and Disorder (Formulation and Implementation of Strategy) (Amendment) Regulations (SI 2010/647)
- The Crime and Disorder (Formulation and Implementation of Strategy) (Wales) (Amendment) Regulations (SI 2010/648)
- The Gangmasters Licensing (Exclusions) Regulations (SI 2010/649)
- The Registered Pension Schemes etc. (Information) (Prescribed Descriptions of Persons) Regulations (SI 2010/650)
- The Registered Pension Schemes (Enhanced Lifetime Allowance) (Amendment) Regulations (SI 2010/651)
- The Registered Pension Schemes and Overseas Pension Schemes (Electronic Communication of Returns and Information) (Amendment) Regulations (SI 2010/652)
- The Town and Country Planning (Use Classes) (Amendment) (England) Order (SI 2010/653)
- The Town and Country Planning (General Permitted Development) (Amendment) (England) Order (SI 2010/654)
- The Town and Country Planning (Compensation) (England) Regulations (SI 2010/655)
- The Crime and Disorder (Prescribed Information) (Amendment) Regulations (SI 2010/656)
- The Health Protection (Local Authority Powers) Regulations (SI 2010/657)
- The Health Protection (Part 2A Orders) Regulations (SI 2010/658)
- The Health Protection (Notification) Regulations (SI 2010/659)
- The Housing and Regeneration Act 2008 (Moratorium) (Prescribed Steps) Order (SI 2010/660)
- The Education (Student Loans) (Repayment) (Amendment) Regulations (SI 2010/661)
- The Housing and Regeneration Act 2008 (Penalty and Compensation Notices) Regulations (SI 2010/662)
- The Housing Management Agreements (Break Clause)(England) Regulations (SI 2010/663)
- The Stamp Duty Reserve Tax (Amendment) Regulations (SI 2010/664)
- The Corporation Tax Act 2010 (Transitional Provision) Order (SI 2010/665)
- The Occupational Pension Schemes (Levy Ceiling) Order (SI 2010/666)
- The Pension Protection Fund (Pension Compensation Cap) Order (SI 2010/667)
- The Income Tax (Pay As You Earn) (Amendment) Regulations (SI 2010/668)
- The Corporation Tax (Treatment of Unrelieved Surplus Advance Corporation Tax) (Amendment) Regulations (SI 2010/669)
- The Finance Act 2009, Paragraph 12(2)(b) of Schedule 22 (Appointed Day) Order (SI 2010/670)
- The Housing and Regeneration Act 2008 (Consequential Provisions) ( 2) Order (SI 2010/671)
- The Authorisation of Frequency Use for the Provision of Mobile Satellite Services (European Union) Regulations (SI 2010/672)
- The MFET Limited (Application of Sections 731, 733 and 734 of the Income Tax (Trading and Other Income) Act 2005) Order (SI 2010/673)
- The Harbours Act 1964 (Delegation of Functions) Order (SI 2010/674)
- The Environmental Permitting (England and Wales) Regulations (SI 2010/675)
- The Environmental Permitting (England and Wales) (Amendment) Regulations (SI 2010/676)
- The Apprenticeships, Skills, Children and Learning Act 2009, Parts 7 and 8 (Consequential Amendments) Order (SI 2010/677)
- The Feed-in Tariffs (Specified Maximum Capacity and Functions) Order (SI 2010/678)
- The Criminal Defence Service (Funding) (Amendment) Order (SI 2010/679)
- The Merchant Shipping (Passenger Ships) (Safety Code for UK Categorised Waters) Regulations (SI 2010/680)
- The Criminal Defence Service (Funding) (Police Station Advice and Assistance) Order (SI 2010/681)
- The Non-Domestic Rating (Definition of Domestic Property) (Wales) Order (SI 2010/682)
- The Accounts and Audit (Wales) (Amendment) Regulations (SI 2010/683)
- The Huntingdonshire (Related Alterations) Order (SI 2010/684)
- The Local Authorities (Capital Finance and Accounting) (Wales) (Amendment) Regulations (SI 2010/685)
- The Insolvency (Amendment) Rules (SI 2010/686)
- The Wellingborough (Related Alterations) (Amendment) Order (SI 2010/687)
- The Insolvency (Scotland) Amendment Rules (SI 2010/688)
- The Civil Enforcement of Parking Contraventions Designation (2) (West Sussex) (Chichester and Crawley) Order (SI 2010/689)
- The Children Act 1989 (Contact Activity Directions and Conditions: Financial Assistance) (Revocation and Transitional Provision) (England) Regulations (SI 2010/690)
- The M5 Motorway (Junction 5, Worcestershire) (Slip Road) (Temporary Prohibition of Traffic) Order (SI 2010/691)
- The M6 Motorway (Junctions 1 – 4) (Temporary Prohibition of Traffic) Order (SI 2010/692)
- The M6 Motorway (Junction 2, Near Coventry) (Temporary Restriction of Traffic) Order (SI 2010/693)
- The A1 Trunk Road (Stoke Rochford to Little Ponton, Lincolnshire) (Temporary Prohibition of Traffic) Order (SI 2010/694)
- The Income Tax (Car Benefits) (Reduction of Value of Appropriate Percentage) (Revocation) Regulations (SI 2010/695)
- The Jobseeker's Allowance (Skills Training Conditionality Pilot) Regulations (SI 2010/696)
- The Child Maintenance and Other Payments Act 2008 (Commencement 7) Order (SI 2010/697)
- The Electricity (Standards of Performance) Regulations (SI 2010/698)
- The Environment Agency (Inland Waterways) Order (SI 2010/699)
- The M40 Motorway (Junction 1, Denham to Junction 4, Handy Cross, Buckinghamshire and Junction 5, Stokenchurch, Buckinghamshire to Junction 6, Lewknor, Oxfordshire) (Temporary Restriction and Prohibition of Traffic) Order (SI 2010/700)

== 701–800 ==
- The M60 Motorway (Junction 10 Anticlockwise Entry Slip Road) (Temporary Prohibition of Traffic) Order (SI 2010/701)
- The M60 Motorway (Junction 9 Anticlockwise Entry Slip Road) (Temporary Prohibition of Traffic) Order (SI 2010/702)
- The Portland Harbour Revision Order (SI 2010/703)
- The M60 Motorway (Junction 13 Anticlockwise Entry Slip Road) (Temporary Prohibition of Traffic) Order (SI 2010/704)
- The M60 Motorway (Junction 11 Anticlockwise Entry Slip Road) (Temporary Prohibition of Traffic) Order (SI 2010/705)
- The M6 Motorway (Junction 20A, Northbound Dedicated Entry Slip Road) (Temporary Prohibition of Traffic) Order (SI 2010/706)
- The Education Act 2002 (Commencement 13) (Wales) Order (SI 2010/707)
- The Health and Social Care Act 2008 (Commencement 15, Consequential Amendments and Transitional and Savings Provisions) Order (SI 2010/708)
- The A20 Trunk Road (Western Heights, Dover to White Horse Hill, Folkestone) (Temporary Prohibition of Traffic) Order (SI 2010/709)
- The M4 Motorway (Junctions 8/9 – 10) (Temporary Restriction and Prohibition of Traffic) Order 2009 Variation Order (SI 2010/710)
- The A3 Trunk Road (Weston Interchange – A3(M)) (Temporary Restriction and Prohibition of Traffic) Order (SI 2010/711)
- The Criminal Justice and Immigration Act 2008 (Commencement 14) Order (SI 2010/712)
- The Valuation Tribunal for Wales Regulations (SI 2010/713)
- The A303 Trunk Road (Salisbury Road Interchange – Picket Twenty Interchange) (Temporary Restriction and Prohibition of Traffic) Order (SI 2010/714)
- The A21 Trunk Road (Vauxhall Lane Interchange – Westerham Road Junction) (Temporary Prohibition of Traffic) Order (SI 2010/715)
- The A2 Trunk Road (A260 Barham Interchange and Coldharbour Lane Junction) (Temporary Prohibition of Traffic) Order (SI 2010/716)
- The Income Tax (Construction Industry Scheme) (Amendment) Regulations (SI 2010/717)
- The A23 Trunk Road (London Road North/Brighton Road, Hooley) (Temporary Restriction and Prohibition of Traffic) Order (SI 2010/718)
- The Building and Approved Inspectors (Amendment) Regulations (SI 2010/719)
- The Health Act 2009 (Powers in Relation to NHS Bodies—Consequential Amendments) Regulations (SI 2010/720)
- The Social Security (Contributions) (Amendment 4) Regulations (SI 2010/721)
- The Policing and Crime Act 2009 (Commencement 1 and Transitional and Saving Provisions) (England) Order (SI 2010/722)
- The Policing and Crime Act 2009 (Consequential Provisions) (England) Order (SI 2010/723)
- The Train Driving Licences and Certificates Regulations (SI 2010/724)
- The Occupational Pension Schemes (Employer Debt and Miscellaneous Amendments) Regulations (SI 2010/725)
- The Human Fertilisation and Embryology (Procedure on Applications and Execution of Warrants) Regulations (SI 2010/726)
- The Cambridgeshire Community Services National Health Service Trust (Establishment) Order (SI 2010/727)
- The Measuring Instruments (EEC Requirements) (Fees) (Amendment) Regulations (SI 2010/728)
- The National Health Service (Primary Medical Services) (Miscellaneous Amendments) (Wales) Regulations (SI 2010/729)
- The National Health Service (Charges to Overseas Visitors) (Amendment) (Wales) Regulations (SI 2010/730)
- The Magistrates’ Courts Fees (Amendment) Order (SI 2010/731)
- The Insolvency Proceedings (Fees) (Amendment) Order (SI 2010/732)
- The Adult Skills (Specified Qualifications) Regulations (SI 2010/733)
- The Insolvency (Amendment) ( 2) Rules (SI 2010/734)
- The Education Act 2005 (Commencement 2) (Wales) Order (SI 2010/735)
- The Education and Inspections Act 2006 (Commencement 5 and Transitional Provision) (Wales) Order (SI 2010/736)
- The Merchant Shipping (Maritime Labour Convention) (Medical Certification) Regulations (SI 2010/737)
- The School Teachers’ Incentive Payments (England) Order (SI 2010/738)
- The Diseases of Animals (Approved Disinfectants) (Fees) (England) Order (SI 2010/739)
- The Detergents Regulations (SI 2010/740)
- The Blackburn with Darwen Primary Care Trust (Change of Name) (Establishment) Amendment Order (SI 2010/741)
- The National Health Service Trusts (Consultation on Establishment and Dissolution) Regulations (SI 2010/743)
- The Childcare (Exemptions from Registration) (Amendment) Order (SI 2010/744)
- The Biocidal Products (Amendment) Regulations (SI 2010/745)
- The Independent Review of Determinations (Adoption and Fostering) (Wales) Regulations (SI 2010/746)
- The Tribunal Procedure (Upper Tribunal) (Amendment) Rules (SI 2010/747)
- The Natural Mineral Water, Spring Water and Bottled Drinking Water (Wales) (Amendment) Regulations (SI 2010/748)
- The Children and Young Persons Act 2008 (Commencement 3) (Wales) Order (SI 2010/749)
- The Health and Social Care Act 2008 (Consequential Amendments) Order (SI 2010/750)
- The Tax Credits (Miscellaneous Amendments) Regulations (SI 2010/751)
- The Council Tax and Non-Domestic Rating (Amendment) (England) Regulations (SI 2010/752)
- The A2070 Trunk Road (Clover Leaf Interchange) (Temporary Prohibition of Traffic) Order (SI 2010/753)
- The A2 Trunk Road (Brenley Corner to Bridge) (Temporary Prohibition of Traffic) Order (SI 2010/754)
- The A47 Trunk Road (Great Fransham to East Dereham, Norfolk) (Temporary Restriction and Prohibition of Traffic) Order (SI 2010/755)
- The M40 Motorway (Junction 4 Buckinghamshire and Junction 7 to Junction 6 and Junction 8a Oxfordshire) (Temporary Restriction and Prohibition of Traffic) Order (SI 2010/756)
- The A47 Trunk Road (A1260 Interchange Junction 15 to Topmoor Way/Fulbridge Road Interchange Junction 19, City of Peterborough) (Temporary Restriction and Prohibition of Traffic) Order (SI 2010/757)
- The A1 Trunk Road (Brampton, Cambridgeshire) Southbound Entry Slip Road (Temporary Prohibition of Traffic) Order (SI 2010/758)
- The A66 Trunk Road (Layby at Burnhope Farm, Hartburn) (Temporary Prohibition of Traffic) Order (SI 2010/759)
- Welsh Zone (Boundaries and Transfer of Functions) Order 2010 (SI 2010/760)
- The European Communities (Designation) Order (SI 2010/761)
- The House of Commons Disqualification Order (SI 2010/762)
- The International Criminal Court Act 2001 (Overseas Territories) (Amendment) Order (SI 2010/763)
- The Police Act 1997 (Criminal Records) (Isle of Man) Order (SI 2010/764)
- The Police Act 1997 (Criminal Records) (Jersey) Order (SI 2010/765)
- The European Union (Definition of Treaties) (Stabilisation and Association Agreement) (Bosnia and Herzegovina) Order (SI 2010/766)
- The Uzbekistan (Restrictive Measures) (Overseas Territories) (Revocation) Order (SI 2010/767)
- The CRC Energy Efficiency Scheme Order (SI 2010/768)
- The Inspectors of Education, Children's Services and Skills ( 2) Order (SI 2010/769)
- The Air Navigation (Amendment) Order (SI 2010/770)
- The Motor Vehicles (International Circulation) (Amendment) Order (SI 2010/771)
- The Occupational and Personal Pension Schemes (Automatic Enrolment) Regulations (SI 2010/772)
- The Government Annuities Payment (Amendment) Regulations (SI 2010/773)
- The Gambling Act 2005 (Operating Licence Conditions) (Amendment) Regulations (SI 2010/774)
- The M20 Motorway (Junctions 4 to 7) (Variable Speed Limits) Regulations (SI 2010/775)
- The M5 Motorway (Junction 29 Connecting Road) Scheme (SI 2010/776)
- The A30 Trunk Road (Improvement at M5 Junction 29) Order (SI 2010/777)
- The Immigration and Nationality (Fees) Regulations (SI 2010/778)
- The Health Act 2009 (Commencement 2) Order (SI 2010/779)
- The Health and Social Care Act 2008 (Regulated Activities) Regulations (SI 2010/781)
- The UK Border Agency (Complaints and Misconduct) Regulations (SI 2010/782)
- The Volatile Organic Compounds in Paints, Varnishes and Vehicle Refinishing Products (Amendment) Regulations (SI 2010/783)
- The Asylum Support (Amendment) Regulations (SI 2010/784)
- The British Nationality (General) (Amendment) Regulations (SI 2010/785)
- The Family Proceedings (Amendment) Rules (SI 2010/786)
- The Family Proceedings Courts (Children Act 1989) (Amendment) Rules (SI 2010/787)
- The Social Security Benefit (Persons Abroad) (Amendment) Regulations (SI 2010/788)
- The Education (Publication of Draft Proposals and Orders) (Further Education Corporations) (England) (Amendment) Regulations (SI 2010/789)
- The Retention of Knives in Court Regulations (SI 2010/790)
- The Copyright Tribunal Rules (SI 2010/791)
- The Schedule 39 to the Finance Act 2002 and Recovery of Taxes etc. Due in Other Member States (Amendment) Regulations (SI 2010/792)
- The Social Security Benefits Up-rating Order (SI 2010/793)
- The Recovery of Foreign Taxes (Amendment) Regulations (SI 2010/794)
- The Recovery of Import Duties and Export Duties (Andorra) Regulations (SI 2010/795)
- The Social Security (Claims and Payments) Amendment Regulations (SI 2010/796)
- The Fish Labelling (Wales) Regulations (SI 2010/797)
- The Hertfordshire Primary Care Trust (Establishment) and East and North Hertfordshire Primary Care Trust and West Hertfordshire Primary Care Trust (Dissolution) Order (SI 2010/798)
- The National Assistance (Assessment of Resources and Sums for Personal Requirements) (Amendment) (Wales) Regulations (SI 2010/799)
- The Employee Study and Training (Qualifying Period of Employment) Regulations (SI 2010/800)

== 801–900 ==
- The Transmissible Spongiform Encephalopathies (England) Regulations (SI 2010/801)
- The Goods Vehicles (Licensing of Operators) (Temporary Use in Great Britain) (Amendment) Regulations (SI 2010/804)
- The Health and Social Care Act 2008 (Commencement 16, Transitory and Transitional Provisions) Order (SI 2010/807)
- The Exchange Gains and Losses (Bringing into Account Gains or Losses) (Amendment) Regulations (SI 2010/809)
- The Notification of Conventional Tower Cranes (Amendment) Regulations (SI 2010/811)
- The Northern Ireland Act 2009 (Commencement 2) Order (SI 2010/812)
- The Health and Social Care Act 2008 (Consequential Amendments 2) Order (SI 2010/813)
- The Stamp Duty Land Tax (Alternative Finance Investment Bonds) Regulations (SI 2010/814)
- The Finance Act 2009, Schedule 50 (Record-keeping) (Appointed Day) Order (SI 2010/815)
- The Coroners and Justice Act 2009 (Commencement 4, Transitional and Saving Provisions) Order (SI 2010/816)
- The Police Act 1997 (Criminal Records) (Amendment) Regulations (SI 2010/817)
- The Community Legal Service (Financial) (Amendment 2) Regulations (SI 2010/818)
- The Diocese of Coventry (Educational Endowments) Order (SI 2010/819)
- The Diocese of Blackburn (Educational Endowments) Order (SI 2010/820)
- The Diocese of Newcastle (Educational Endowments) Order (SI 2010/821)
- The Diocese of Norwich (Educational Endowments) Order (SI 2010/822)
- The School Standards and Framework Act 1998 (Repeal) (Wales) Order (SI 2010/823)
- The School Funding (Wales) Regulations (SI 2010/824)
- The Right to Manage (Prescribed Particulars and Forms) (England) Regulations (SI 2010/825)
- The Social Security Benefits Up-rating Regulations (SI 2010/826)
- The Diocese of Chester (Educational Endowments) Order (SI 2010/827)
- The Banking Act 2009 (Inter-Bank Payment Systems) (Disclosure and Publication of Specified Information) Regulations (SI 2010/828)
- The Renewables Obligation (Amendment) Order (SI 2010/829)
- The Parliamentary Elections (Returning Officers’ Charges) Order (SI 2010/830)
- The Audiovisual Media Services (Product Placement) Regulations (SI 2010/831)
- The Armed Forces (Redundancy, Resettlement and Gratuity Earnings Schemes) ( 2) Order (SI 2010/832)
- The Social Security (Industrial Injuries) (Dependency) (Permitted Earnings Limits) Order (SI 2010/833)
- The Social Security (Contributions) (Amendment) Regulations (SI 2010/834)
- The Individual Savings Account (Amendment) Regulations (SI 2010/835)
- The Child Trust Funds (Amendment 2) Regulations (SI 2010/836)
- The Jobseeker's Allowance (Lone Parents) (Availability for Work) Regulations (SI 2010/837)
- The Bedfordshire and Luton Mental Health and Social Care Partnership National Health Service Trust (Dissolution) Order (SI 2010/838)
- The Legislative Reform (Dangerous Wild Animals) (Licensing) Order (SI 2010/839)
- The Social Security (Miscellaneous Amendments) ( 3) Regulations (SI 2010/840)
- The Rules of the Air (Amendment) Regulations (SI 2010/841)
- The A1 Trunk Road (Charlton Mires to Newham Junction) (Temporary Restriction and Prohibition of Traffic) Order (SI 2010/842)
- The A1 Trunk Road (Stannington to Hebron Junction) (Temporary Restriction and Prohibition of Traffic) Order (SI 2010/843)
- The Housing and Regeneration Act 2008 (Registration of Local Authorities) Order (SI 2010/844)
- The A34 Trunk Road (South Hinksey, Northbound Entry Slip Road) (Temporary Prohibition of Traffic) Order (SI 2010/845)
- The A3 Trunk Road (Stoke Interchange – University Interchange) (Temporary Prohibition of Traffic) Order (SI 2010/848)
- The M5 Motorway (Junctions 17–18) (Temporary Prohibition and Restriction of Traffic) Order 2009 Variation Order (SI 2010/851)
- The M602 Motorway (Westbound Link Road to the M60 Motorway Clockwise at Junction 12) (Temporary Prohibition of Traffic) Order (SI 2010/852)
- The Complaints against Schools (England) Regulations (SI 2010/853)
- The M56 Motorway (Junction 15 Westbound Link Road to the M53 Southbound), the M53 Motorway (Junctions 11–12 Southbound and Northbound Carriageways) and the A55 Trunk Road (Temporary Prohibition and Restriction of Traffic) Order (SI 2010/854)
- The M60 Motorway (Junction 2 Clockwise Entry Slip Road) (Temporary Prohibition of Traffic) Order (SI 2010/855)
- The School Support Staff Negotiating Body (Excluded Persons) Regulations (SI 2010/856)
- The M60 Motorway (Junction 27, Clockwise Entry Slip Road) (Temporary Prohibition of Traffic) ( 2) Order (SI 2010/857)
- The M60 Motorway (Junction 24 Anticlockwise and Clockwise Entry Slip Roads) (Temporary Prohibition of Traffic) Order (SI 2010/858)
- The M60 Motorway (Junction 1 Clockwise and Anticlockwise Entry Slip Roads) (Temporary Prohibition of Traffic) Order (SI 2010/859)
- The Licensing Act 2003 (Mandatory Licensing Conditions) Order (SI 2010/860)
- The Extradition Act 2003 (Amendment to Designations) Order (SI 2010/861)
- The Housing and Regeneration Act 2008 (Commencement 7 and Transitional and Saving Provisions) Order (SI 2010/862)
- The Tobacco Advertising and Promotion (Display of Prices) (England) Regulations (SI 2010/863)
- The Protection from Tobacco (Sales from Vending Machines) (England) Regulations (SI 2010/864)
- The Vehicle Drivers (Certificates of Professional Competence) (Amendment) Regulations (SI 2010/865)
- The Housing and Regeneration Act 2008 (Consequential Provisions) Order (SI 2010/866)
- The Finance Act 2009, Schedule 51 (Time Limits for Assessments, Claims, etc.) (Appointed Days and Transitional Provisions) Order (SI 2010/867)
- The National Health Service (Pharmaceutical Services) (Amendment) (Wales) Regulations (SI 2010/868)
- The Parliamentary Elections (Returning Officer's Charges) (Northern Ireland) Order (SI 2010/869)
- The Social Security (Claims and Payments) Amendment ( 2) Regulations (SI 2010/870)
- The M6 Motorway (Junction 31A, Southbound Carriageway and Southbound Entry Slip Road) (Temporary Prohibition and Restriction of Traffic) Order (SI 2010/871)
- The A38 Trunk Road (Lee Mill, Near Ivybridge, to Voss Farm, Near Plymouth, Devon) (Temporary Prohibition and Restriction of Traffic) Order 2010 Variation Order (SI 2010/872)
- The M60 Motorway (Junctions 18 – 19 Carriageway and Slip Roads) and M66 Motorway (Northbound and Southbound) (Temporary Prohibition and Restriction of Traffic) Order (SI 2010/873)
- The M61 Motorway (Junction 3 Southbound Entry Slip Road) (Temporary Prohibition of Traffic) Order (SI 2010/874)
- The Employment and Support Allowance (Transitional Provisions, Housing Benefit and Council Tax Benefit) (Existing Awards) Regulations (SI 2010/875)
- The A308(M) Motorway (Bray Wick – M4 Junction 8/9) (Temporary Prohibition of Traffic) Order (SI 2010/876)
- The M25 Motorway (Junctions 3 – 4, Slip/Link Roads) (Temporary Prohibition of Traffic) Order (SI 2010/877)
- The A2070 Trunk Road (Bromley Green) (Temporary Speed Restrictions) Order (SI 2010/878)
- The M25 Motorway and the M3 Motorway (M25 Junctions 11 and 12, Slip/Link Roads) (Temporary Prohibition of Traffic) Order (SI 2010/879)
- The M5 Motorway (Junction 28 Slip Roads) (Temporary Prohibition of Traffic) Order (SI 2010/880)
- The Local Democracy, Economic Development and Construction Act 2009 (Commencement 3) Order (SI 2010/881)
- The Service Voters’ Registration Period Order (SI 2010/882)
- The Constitutional Reform Act 2005 (Commencement 12) Order (SI 2010/883)
- The M6 Motorway (Junction 38 Northbound and Southbound Carriageways and Junction 38 Slip Roads) (Temporary Prohibition and Restriction of Traffic) Order (SI 2010/884)
- The A34 Trunk Road (Fir Tree Farm – Ashridge Farm, Northbound) (Temporary Restriction and Prohibition of Traffic) Order (SI 2010/885)
- The A27 Trunk Road (Pevensey Bypass) (Temporary Speed Restrictions) Order (SI 2010/886)
- The M4 Motorway (Junctions 6 – 8/9, Westbound) (Temporary Prohibition of Traffic) Order (SI 2010/887)
- The M27 Motorway (Junction 12, Link/Slip Roads) (Temporary Prohibition of Traffic) Order (SI 2010/888)
- The A12 Trunk Road (Station Road Roundabout, Hopton-on-Sea, Norfolk to Bentley Drive Roundabout, Lowestoft, Suffolk) (Temporary Restriction and Prohibition of Traffic) Order (SI 2010/889)
- The Immigration Services Commissioner (Designated Professional Body) (Fees) Order (SI 2010/891)
- The Passenger and Goods Vehicles (Community Recording Equipment Regulation) Regulations (SI 2010/892)
- The Food Hygiene (Wales) (Amendment) Regulations (SI 2010/893)
- The Electronic Commerce Directive (Hatred against Persons on Religious Grounds or the Grounds of Sexual Orientation) Regulations (SI 2010/894)
- The Merchant Shipping (Prevention of Air Pollution from Ships) (Amendment) Regulations (SI 2010/895)
- The Natural Mineral Water, Spring Water and Bottled Drinking Water (England) (Amendment) (2) Regulations (SI 2010/896)
- The Merchant Shipping (Prevention of Pollution by Sewage and Garbage from Ships)(Amendment) Regulations (SI 2010/897)
- The Local Authorities (Petitions) (England) Order (SI 2010/898)
- The Police Pensions (Descriptions of Service) Order (SI 2010/899)
- The Animal Gatherings (Wales) Order (SI 2010/900)

== 901–1000 ==
- The A23 Trunk Road (Handcross to Warninglid Widening Slip Roads) Order (SI 2010/901)
- The Aviation Security Regulations (SI 2010/902)
- The Redundancy Payments (Continuity of Employment in Local Government, etc.) (Modification) Order (Amendment) Order (SI 2010/903)
- The Rail Vehicle Accessibility (Networks) Exemption Order (SI 2010/904)
- The Financial Services and Markets Act 2000 (Financial Promotion) (Amendment) Order (SI 2010/905)
- The Credit Rating Agencies Regulations (SI 2010/906)
- The Marine and Coastal Access Act 2009 (Commencement 3) Order (SI 2010/907)
- The Assured Tenancies (Amendment)(England) Order (SI 2010/908)
- The European Parliamentary (United Kingdom Representatives) Pensions (Amendment) Order (SI 2010/909)
- The Data Protection (Monetary Penalties) Order (SI 2010/910)
- The Personal Accounts Delivery Authority Winding Up Order (SI 2010/911)
- The Management of Offenders etc. (Scotland) Act 2005 (Disclosure of Information) Order (SI 2010/912)
- The Hearing Aid Council (Transfer of Property, Rights and Liabilities) Order (SI 2010/913)
- The National Health Service (Pharmaceutical Services and Local Pharmaceutical Services) (Amendment) Regulations (SI 2010/914)
- The National Health Service (Reimbursement of the Cost of EEA Treatment) Regulations (SI 2010/915)
- The Workmen's Compensation (Supplementation) (Amendment) Scheme (SI 2010/916)
- The National Employment Savings Trust Order (SI 2010/917)
- The Working Tax Credit (Entitlement and Maximum Rate) (Amendment) Regulations (SI 2010/918)
- The Value Added Tax (Consideration for Fuel Provided for Private Use) Order (SI 2010/919)
- The Value Added Tax (Increase of Registration Limits) Order (SI 2010/920)
- The Saving Gateway Accounts Act 2009 (Commencement 2) Order (SI 2010/921)
- The Registered Pension Schemes (Standard Lifetime and Annual Allowances) Order (SI 2010/922)
- The Capital Gains Tax (Annual Exempt Amount) Order (SI 2010/923)
- The Landfill Tax (Amendment) Regulations (SI 2010/924)
- The Income Tax (Manufactured Overseas Dividends) (Amendment) Regulations (SI 2010/925)
- The Recovery of Social Security Contributions Due in Other Member States Regulations (SI 2010/926)
- The National Health Service (Charges to Overseas Visitors) (Miscellaneous Amendments) (Wales) Regulations (SI 2010/927)
- The A1(M) Motorway (Junction 7 – Junction 8 Northbound, Hertfordshire) (Temporary Restriction and Prohibition of Traffic) Order (SI 2010/928)
- The A1 Trunk Road (Adderstone Junction to Buckton) (Temporary Restriction and Prohibition of Traffic) Order (SI 2010/929)
- The Health Act 2009 (Commencement 1) (Wales) Order (SI 2010/930)
- The A66 Trunk Road (Blackwell Roundabout to Yarm Road Interchange) (Temporary Restriction and Prohibition of Traffic) Order (SI 2010/931)
- The A19 Trunk Road (Coast Road Interchange To Moor Farm Roundabout) (Temporary Restriction and Prohibition of Traffic) Order (SI 2010/932)
- The A1 Trunk Road and the A1(M) (Blyth, Nottinghamshire) (Temporary Restriction and Prohibition of Traffic) Order (SI 2010/933)
- The County Borough of Caerphilly (Communities) Order (SI 2010/934)
- The A46 Trunk Road (Syston to Dalby Wolds, Leicestershire) (Temporary Restriction and Prohibition of Traffic) Order (SI 2010/935)
- The A38 Trunk Road (Alfreton, Derbyshire) (Temporary Restriction and Prohibition of Traffic) Order (SI 2010/936)
- The Freedom of Information (Additional Public Authorities) Order (SI 2010/937)
- The A1 Trunk Road (Between Newark-on-Trent and Long Bennington) (Temporary Prohibition of Traffic) Order (SI 2010/938)
- The Freedom of Information (Removal of References to Public Authorities) Order (SI 2010/939)
- The M3 Motorway and the A303 Trunk Road (Popham Interchange) (Temporary Restriction and Prohibition of Traffic) Order (SI 2010/940)
- The M27 Motorway (Junction 7, Eastbound) (Temporary Prohibition of Traffic) Order (SI 2010/941)
- The A34 Trunk Road (East Ilsley – Gore Hill, Northbound) (Temporary Speed Restrictions) Order (SI 2010/942)
- The Animal Welfare (Electronic Collars) (Wales) Regulations (SI 2010/943)
- The M4 Motorway (West of Junction 14) (Temporary Restriction of Traffic) Order (SI 2010/944)
- The A27 Trunk Road (Selmeston – Berwick) (Temporary Speed Restrictions) Order (SI 2010/945)
- The A303 Trunk Road (Bullington Cross – Andover) (Temporary Restriction and Prohibition of Traffic) Order (SI 2010/946)
- The A46 Trunk Road (Cold Ashton Roundabout to London Road Junction, Bath) (Temporary Prohibition of Traffic) Order (SI 2010/947)
- The Community Infrastructure Levy Regulations (SI 2010/948)
- The M6 Motorway (Junctions 32–33, Northbound Carriageway) and the M55 Motorway (Junction 1, Eastbound Carriageway, Entry Slip Road and Link Road to the M6 Northbound) (Temporary Prohibition and Restriction of Traffic) Order (SI 2010/949)
- The A64 Trunk Road (Seamer Carr Roundabout) (Temporary Prohibition of Traffic) Order (SI 2010/950)
- The Special Restrictions on Adoptions from Abroad (Nepal) Order (SI 2010/951)
- The A20 Trunk Road (Western Heights Roundabout – Satmar Lane Overbridge) (Restriction on Use of Offside Lane) (Experimental) Order (SI 2010/952)
- The M65 Motorway Junction 2 (Walton Summit Spur) (Temporary Prohibition of Traffic) Order (SI 2010/953)
- The A550 Trunk Road (Between Woodbank Road and the A540 Park Gate Road) (Temporary Prohibition of Traffic) Order (SI 2010/954)
- The M6 Motorway (Junctions 16–19 Northbound and Southbound Entry and Exit Slip Roads) and Knutsford Service Area and Sandbach Service Area Slip Roads (Temporary Prohibition of Traffic) Order (SI 2010/955)
- The A5 Trunk Road (North East of Rugby, Warwickshire) (Temporary Restriction and Prohibition of Traffic) Order (SI 2010/956)
- The Immigration (Leave to Enter and Remain) (Amendment) Order (SI 2010/957)
- The A1 Trunk Road (Grantham, Lincolnshire) (Temporary Restriction and Prohibition of Traffic) Order (SI 2010/958)
- The Care Planning, Placement and Case Review (England) Regulations (SI 2010/959)
- The Education (Student Support) (College of Europe) Regulations (SI 2010/960)
- The A1 Trunk Road (Stamford to Ranby) (Temporary Prohibition of Traffic in Laybys) Order (SI 2010/961)
- The A14 Trunk Road (Rothwell to Kettering, Northamptonshire) (Temporary Restriction and Prohibition of Traffic) Order (SI 2010/962)
- The A49 Trunk Road (Ludlow Bypass, Shropshire) (Temporary Restriction and Prohibition of Traffic) Order (SI 2010/963)
- The Road Vehicles (Construction and Use)(Amendment)( 2) Regulations (SI 2010/964)
- The A38 Trunk Road (Markeaton Roundabout to Palm Court Roundabout, Derby) (Temporary Prohibition of Traffic) Order (SI 2010/965)
- The A1 Trunk Road (Newark-on-Trent) (Temporary Restriction and Prohibition of Traffic) Order (SI 2010/966)
- The A52 and A453 Trunk Roads (Nottingham) (Link Road) (Temporary Prohibition of Traffic) Order (SI 2010/967)
- The A52 Trunk Road (Holme House Junction, Nottinghamshire) Temporary Prohibition of Traffic) Order (SI 2010/968)
- The Political Parties and Elections Act 2009 (Commencement 3 and Saving Provision) Order (SI 2010/969)
- The Crime and Disorder Act 1998 (Responsible Authorities) Order (SI 2010/970)
- The M1 Motorway (Junction 25) and the A52 Trunk Road (Derbyshire) (Temporary Prohibition of Traffic) Order (SI 2010/971)
- The M5 Motorway (Junction 9) and the A46 Trunk Road (Temporary Restriction and Prohibition of Traffic) Order (SI 2010/972)
- The A45 Trunk Road (Higham Ferrers to Thrapston, Northamptonshire) (Temporary Prohibition of Traffic in Laybys) Order (SI 2010/973)
- The A43 Trunk Road (Towcester to M1 Junction 15a) (Temporary Prohibition of Traffic in Laybys) Order (SI 2010/974)
- The Water Act 2003 (Commencement 10) Order (SI 2010/975)
- The Northern Ireland Act 1998 (Devolution of Policing and Justice Functions) Order (SI 2010/976)
- The Northern Ireland Act 1998 (Amendment of Schedule 3) Order (SI 2010/977)
- The Guardian's Allowance Up-rating Order (SI 2010/978)
- The Guardian's Allowance Up-rating (Northern Ireland) Order (SI 2010/979)
- The Representation of the People (Scotland) (Amendment) Regulations (SI 2010/980)
- The Tax Credits Up-rating Regulations (SI 2010/981)
- The Child Benefit Up-rating Order (SI 2010/982)
- The Beef and Veal Labelling Regulations (SI 2010/983)
- The Biodiesel Duty (Biodiesel Produced From Waste Cooking Oil) (Relief) Regulations (SI 2010/984)
- The Human Fertilisation and Embryology (Parental Orders) Regulations (SI 2010/985)
- The Human Fertilisation and Embryology (Parental Orders) (Consequential, Transitional and Saving Provisions) Order (SI 2010/986)
- The Human Fertilisation and Embryology Act 2008 (Commencement 3) Order (SI 2010/987)
- The Crossrail (Devolution of Functions) Order (SI 2010/988)
- The Health and Social Care Act 2008 (Commencement 2 and Transitional Provisions) (Wales) Order (SI 2010/989)
- The Teachers’ Pensions Regulations (SI 2010/990)
- The Water Supply Regulations (SI 2010/991)
- The Goods Infringing Intellectual Property Rights (Customs) (Amendment) ( 2) Regulations (SI 2010/992)
- The New Forest (Confirmation of the Byelaws of the Verderers of the New Forest) Order (SI 2010/993)
- The Water Supply (Water Quality) Regulations (SI 2010/994)
- The Human Fertilisation and Embryology (Disclosure of Information for Research Purposes) Regulations (SI 2010/995)
- The Water Supply (Miscellaneous Amendments) (England and Wales) Regulations (SI 2010/996)
- The Norwich and Norfolk (Structural Changes) Order (SI 2010/997)
- The Exeter and Devon (Structural Changes) Order (SI 2010/998)
- The Policing and Crime Act 2009 (Commencement 5) Order (SI 2010/999)
- The National Health Service (Direct Payments) Regulations (SI 2010/1000)

== 1001–1100 ==
- The Air Quality Standards Regulations (SI 2010/1001)
- The Education (Independent Educational Provision in England) (Inspection Fees) (Amendment) Regulations (SI 2010/1002)
- The Motor Vehicles (Off Road Events) (Amendment) (England) Regulations (SI 2010/1003)
- The Identification and Traceability of Explosives Regulations (SI 2010/1004)
- The Motor Vehicle (Competitions and Trials) (Amendment) (England) Regulations (SI 2010/1005)
- The School Information (England) (Amendment) Regulations (SI 2010/1006)
- The Air Navigation (Restriction of Flying) (Glastonbury Festival) Regulations 2010 (SI 2010/1007)
- The Air Navigation (Restriction of Flying) (RNAS Yeovilton) Regulations 2010 (SI 2010/1008)
- The Air Navigation (Restriction of Flying) (Royal Air Force Waddington) Regulations 2010 (SI 2010/1009)
- The Consumer Credit (EU Directive) Regulations (SI 2010/1010)
- The Consumer Credit (Total Charge for Credit) Regulations (SI 2010/1011)
- The Consumer Credit (Advertisements) Regulations (SI 2010/1012)
- The Consumer Credit (Disclosure of Information) Regulations (SI 2010/1013)
- The Consumer Credit (Agreements) Regulations (SI 2010/1014)
- The Air Navigation (Restriction of Flying) (Jet Formation Display Teams) (Kirton-in-Lindsey) Regulations 2010 (SI 2010/1015)
- The Air Navigation (Restriction of Flying) (Cheltenham Festival) (Amendment) Regulations 2010 (SI 2010/1016)
- The Air Navigation (Restriction of Flying) (Duxford) Regulations 2010 (SI 2010/1017)
- The Air Navigation (Restriction of Flying) (Weston Park) Regulations 2010 (SI 2010/1018)
- The Air Navigation (Restriction of Flying) (Southend) Regulations 2010 (SI 2010/1019)
- The Air Navigation (Restriction of Flying) (Wycombe Air Park) (Aero Expo) Regulations 2010 (SI 2010/1020)
- The Chief Executive of Skills Funding (Strategy for Birmingham City Region) Order (SI 2010/1023)
- The A43 Trunk Road (M40 Junction 10 to M1 Junction 15a) (Temporary Prohibition of Traffic) Order (SI 2010/1024)
- The Air Navigation (Restriction of Flying) (Royal International Air Tattoo RAF Fairford) Regulations 2010 (SI 2010/1025)
- The A1 Trunk Road (Stamford to Grantham) (Temporary Prohibition of Traffic) Order (SI 2010/1027)
- The A1 Trunk Road (Tickencote to Tinwell) (Temporary Restriction and Prohibition of Traffic) Order (SI 2010/1028)
- The A46 Trunk Road (Leicester to Thorpe on the Hill) (Temporary Prohibition of Traffic in Laybys) Order (SI 2010/1029)
- The M25 Motorway (Junctions 19 – 21A) (Temporary Restriction and Prohibition of Traffic) Order (SI 2010/1030)
- The M4 Motorway (Junction 7, Westbound Exit Slip Road) (Temporary Prohibition of Traffic) Order (SI 2010/1031)
- The A1(M) Motorway (Junction 1, Southbound Exit Slip Road) (Temporary Prohibition of Traffic) Order (SI 2010/1032)
- The Parliamentary Standards Act 2009 (Commencement 3) Order (SI 2010/1033)
- The M3 Motorway (Junctions 8 – 9) (Temporary Prohibition of Traffic) Order (SI 2010/1034)
- The Guardian's Allowance Up-rating Regulations (SI 2010/1035)
- The A27 Trunk Road (South of Cophall Roundabout – East of Pevensey Bypass Roundabout) (Temporary Speed Restrictions) Order (SI 2010/1036)
- The A31 Trunk Road (Ringwood Road, St Leonards) (Temporary Prohibition of Traffic) Order (SI 2010/1037)
- The A21 Trunk Road (John's Cross – Marley Lane) (Temporary Speed Restrictions) Order (SI 2010/1038)
- The M2 Motorway (Junctions 1 – 3) (Temporary Restriction and Prohibition of Traffic) Order (SI 2010/1039)
- The A1(M) Motorway (Junction 44, Bramham Crossroads) (Temporary Prohibition of Traffic) Order (SI 2010/1040)
- The M62 Motorway (Junction 24, Ainley Top) (Temporary Prohibition of Traffic) Order (SI 2010/1041)
- The A1 Trunk Road (Tweedmouthmoor to Letham Shank) (Temporary Restriction and Prohibition of Traffic) (2) Order (SI 2010/1042)
- The A1(M) Motorway (Junction 56 to Junction 57) and the A66(M) Motorway (Temporary Restriction and Prohibition of Traffic) (2) Order (SI 2010/1043)
- The A34 Trunk Road (Gore Hill, Northbound Carriageway) (Lay-By Closure and Restriction on Use of Offside Lane) (Experimental) Order (SI 2010/1044)
- The M27 Motorway (Junction 12, Eastbound) (Temporary Prohibition of Traffic) Order (SI 2010/1045)
- The A2 Trunk Road (Upper Harbledown – Bridge, Coastbound) (Temporary Prohibition of Traffic) Order (SI 2010/1046)
- The A21 Trunk Road (John's Cross – Ebden's Hill) (Temporary Restriction and Prohibition of Traffic) Order (SI 2010/1047)
- The A38 Trunk Road (Carminow to Colesloggett, Near Bodmin, Cornwall) (Temporary Prohibition and Restriction of Traffic) Order (SI 2010/1048)
- The M62 Motorway (Junctions 7-6 Westbound Carriageway), the M57 Motorway (Junctions 2-1 Southbound Carriageway) and Link and Slip Roads (Temporary Prohibition of Traffic) Order (SI 2010/1049)
- The Planning (Hazardous Substances) (Amendment) (England) Regulations (SI 2010/1050)
- The Whole of Government Accounts (Designation of Bodies) Order (SI 2010/1051)
- The A1(M) Motorway and the A1 Trunk Road (Dishforth Interchange to Leeming Bar Interchange) (Temporary Prohibition of Traffic) Order (SI 2010/1052)
- The M5 Motorway (Junctions 14–17) (Temporary Prohibition and Restriction of Traffic) Order (SI 2010/1053)
- The M6 Motorway (Junctions 39–41, Northbound and Southbound Carriageways) (Temporary Restriction of Traffic) Order (SI 2010/1054)
- The Additional Paternity Leave Regulations (SI 2010/1055)
- The Additional Statutory Paternity Pay (General) Regulations (SI 2010/1056)
- The Additional Statutory Paternity Pay (Adoptions from Overseas) Regulations (SI 2010/1057)
- The Employment Rights Act 1996 (Application of Section 80BB to Adoptions from Overseas) Regulations (SI 2010/1058)
- The Additional Paternity Leave (Adoptions from Overseas) Regulations (SI 2010/1059)
- The Additional Statutory Paternity Pay (Weekly Rates) Regulations (SI 2010/1060)
- The Safeguarding Vulnerable Groups Act 2006 (Appropriate Officer and Schedule 7 Prescribed Persons) Regulations (SI 2010/1061)
- The Public Guardian (Fees, etc.) (Amendment) Regulations (SI 2010/1062)
- The Lasting Powers of Attorney, Enduring Powers of Attorney and Public Guardian (Amendment) Regulations (SI 2010/1063)
- The Family Proceedings (Amendment) (2) Rules (SI 2010/1064)
- The Family Proceedings Courts (Children Act 1989) (Amendment) (2) Rules (SI 2010/1065)
- The M60 Motorway (Junction 26 Clockwise Entry and Exit Slip Roads) (Temporary Prohibition of Traffic) Order (SI 2010/1066)
- The Crime and Disorder Act 1998 (Intervention Orders) (Amendment) Order (SI 2010/1067)
- The Health Act 2009 (Commencement 3) Order (SI 2010/1068)
- The Food Labelling (Nutrition Information) (Wales) (Amendment) Regulations (SI 2010/1069)
- The Police Authority and Metropolitan Police Authority (Amendment) Regulations (SI 2010/1070)
- The Education (Short Stay Schools) (Closure) (England) Regulations (SI 2010/1071)
- The Appointments Commission (Amendment) Regulations (SI 2010/1072)
- The Safeguarding Vulnerable Groups Act 2006 (Supervisory Authorities and Devolution Alignment) Order (SI 2010/1073)
- The Education (Pupil Referral Units) (Application of Enactments) (England) (Amendment) Regulations (SI 2010/1074)
- The Merchant Shipping (Technical Requirements for Inland Waterway Vessels) Regulations (SI 2010/1075)
- The M6 Motorway (Junction 16, Southbound Exit Slip Road) (Temporary Prohibition of Traffic) Order (SI 2010/1076)
- The M6 Motorway (Junction 27 Northbound and Southbound Carriageways) (Temporary Prohibition of Traffic) Order (SI 2010/1077)
- The Parliamentary Elections (Welsh Forms) (Amendment) Order (SI 2010/1078)
- The M56 Motorway Junctions 4-2 Eastbound Carriageway (Sharston Link) and Link Road and Slip Roads (Temporary Prohibition and Restriction of Traffic) Order (SI 2010/1079)
- The Apprenticeships, Skills, Children and Learning Act 2009 (Consequential Amendments) (England and Wales) Order (SI 2010/1080)
- The M60 Motorway (Junction 13 Clockwise and Anticlockwise Slip Roads) (Temporary Prohibition of Traffic) Order (SI 2010/1081)
- The M6 Motorway (Junction 18 Northbound Carriageway and Junction 18 Northbound Slip Roads) (Temporary Prohibition and Restriction of Traffic) Order (SI 2010/1082)
- The A27 Trunk Road (Upper Brighton Road) (Temporary Restriction and Prohibition of Traffic) Order (SI 2010/1083)
- The A27 Trunk Road (Hangleton Junction, Westbound) (Temporary Restriction and Prohibition of Traffic) Order (SI 2010/1084)
- The Dairy (Specific Market Support Measure) Regulations (SI 2010/1085)
- The A27 Trunk Road (Polegate) (Temporary Prohibition of Traffic) Order (SI 2010/1086)
- The Police Act 1997 (Criminal Records and Registration) (Jersey) Regulations (SI 2010/1087)
- The Transnational Information and Consultation of Employees (Amendment) Regulations (SI 2010/1088)
- The A303 Trunk Road (Weyhill – Andover) (Temporary Speed Restrictions) Order (SI 2010/1089)
- The Beef and Pig Carcase Classification (England) Regulations (SI 2010/1090)
- The Water Resources (Control of Pollution) (Silage, Slurry and Agricultural Fuel Oil) (England) (Amendment) Regulations (SI 2010/1091)
- The Road Vehicles (Registration and Licensing) (Amendment) ( 2) Regulations (SI 2010/1092)
- The Education and Skills Act 2008 (Commencement 6) Order (SI 2010/1093)
- The End-of-Life Vehicles (Amendment) Regulations (SI 2010/1094)
- The End-of-Life Vehicles (Producer Responsibility) (Amendment) Regulations (SI 2010/1095)
- The Ordnance Survey Trading Fund (Maximum Borrowing) Order (SI 2010/1096)
- The Air Navigation (Restriction of Flying) (Royal Air Force Cosford) Regulations 2010 (SI 2010/1097)
- The Air Navigation (Restriction of Flying) (Woodbridge) Regulations 2010 (SI 2010/1098)
- The Air Navigation (Restriction of Flying) (Silverstone and Turweston) Regulations 2010 (SI 2010/1099)
- The Air Navigation (Restriction of Flying) (Stonehenge) Regulations 2010 (SI 2010/1100)

== 1101–1200 ==
- The Safeguarding Vulnerable Groups Act 2006 (Commencement 6, Transitional Provisions and Savings (Amendment)) and (Commencement 7) Order (SI 2010/1101)
- The Flood Risk (Cross Border Areas) Regulations (SI 2010/1102)
- The M3 Motorway (Junction 6) (Temporary Restriction and Prohibition of Traffic) Order (SI 2010/1103)
- The RAF Welford Byelaws (SI 2010/1104)
- The Mesothelioma Lump Sum Payments (Conditions and Amounts) (Amendment) Regulations (SI 2010/1105)
- The Pneumoconiosis etc. (Workers’ Compensation) (Payment of Claims) (Amendment) Regulations (SI 2010/1106)
- The Renewables Obligation (Amendment) Order (SI 2010/1107)
- The Police and Criminal Evidence Act 1984 (Codes of Practice) (Revisions to Codes E and F) Order (SI 2010/1108)
- The Community Legal Service (Funding) (Amendment 2) Order (SI 2010/1109)
- The Merchant Shipping and Fishing Vessels (Health and Safety at Work) (Miscellaneous Amendments) Regulations (SI 2010/1110)
- The Vehicles Regulations (Amendment) Order (SI 2010/1111)
- The M25 Motorway and the A2 and A282 Trunk Roads (Junctions 1B – 5) (Temporary Prohibition of Traffic) Order (SI 2010/1112)
- The A21 Trunk Road (Kipping's Cross – Lamberhurst Quarter) (Temporary Speed Restrictions) Order (SI 2010/1113)
- The Motor Cycles Etc. and Tractors Etc. (EC Type Approval) (Amendment) Regulations (SI 2010/1114)
- The Motor Vehicles (Third Party Risks) (Amendment) Regulations (SI 2010/1115)
- The Isles of Scilly (Children Act 1989) Order (SI 2010/1116)
- The Motor Vehicles (Electronic Communication of Certificates of Insurance) Order (SI 2010/1117)
- The Legal Services Act 2007 (Commencement 7) Order (SI 2010/1118)
- The A27 Trunk Road (Bognor Road Roundabout – Stockbridge Roundabout, Westbound Carriageway) (Temporary Speed Restrictions) Order (SI 2010/1119)
- The M25 Motorway (Junction 29, Anti-Clockwise Entry Slip Road) (Temporary Prohibition of Traffic) Order (SI 2010/1120)
- The M40 Motorway (Junctions 1 – 15) Slip Roads (Temporary Prohibition of Traffic) Order (SI 2010/1121)
- The M2 Motorway (Medway Services, Londonbound) (Temporary Restriction and Prohibition of Traffic) Order (SI 2010/1122)
- The A1(M) Motorway (Junction 46 to Junction 45) (Temporary Restriction and Prohibition of Traffic) Order (SI 2010/1123)
- The M62 Motorway (Junction 29, Lofthouse Interchange) (Temporary Prohibition of Traffic) Order (SI 2010/1124)
- The M4 Motorway (Junction 20, Almondsbury Interchange) (Temporary Prohibition of Traffic) Order (SI 2010/1125)
- The A5111 Trunk Road (Alvaston, Derbyshire) (Closure of Gap in the Central Reservation) Order (SI 2010/1126)
- The M6 Motorway (Junction 4) (Temporary Prohibition of Traffic) Order (SI 2010/1127)
- The A46 Trunk Road (Newark-on-Trent) (Temporary Prohibition of Traffic in Laybys) Order (SI 2010/1128)
- The M1 Motorway (Junction 22) (Temporary Restriction and Prohibition of Traffic) Order (SI 2010/1129)
- The M1 Motorway (Junctions 23 – 23a) (Temporary Restriction and Prohibition of Traffic) Order (SI 2010/1130)
- The M1 Motorway (Junctions 21 – 22) (Temporary Restriction and Prohibition of Traffic) Order (SI 2010/1131)
- The A14 Trunk Road (M1 Junction 19 to Portly Ford Bridge) (Temporary Restriction and Prohibition of Traffic) Order (SI 2010/1132)
- The A30 Trunk Road (Alphington to Whiddon Down, Devon, and Launceston, Cornwall) (Temporary Prohibition and Restriction of Traffic) Order (SI 2010/1133)
- The Isles of Scilly (Functions) (Adoption and Children Act 2002) Order (SI 2010/1134)
- The A35 Trunk Road (Puddletown to Bere Regis, Dorset) (Temporary Prohibition of Traffic) Order (SI 2010/1135)
- The Medicines for Human Use (Miscellaneous Amendments) Order (SI 2010/1136)
- The A30 Trunk Road (Tolvaddon Interchange to Scorrier Junction, Redruth, Cornwall) (Temporary Prohibition and Restriction of Traffic) Order (SI 2010/1137)
- The M4 Motorway (Junctions 18–17) (Temporary Restriction of Traffic) Order (SI 2010/1138)
- The A30 Trunk Road (Temple to Colliford Lake, Cornwall) (Temporary Restriction of Traffic) Order (SI 2010/1139)
- The Control of Artificial Optical Radiation at Work Regulations (SI 2010/1140)
- The A14 Trunk Road (Between M1 Junction 19 and Thrapston) (Temporary Prohibition of Traffic in Laybys) Order (SI 2010/1141)
- The Local Education Authorities and Children's Services Authorities (Integration of Functions) (Subordinate Legislation) (Wales) Order (SI 2010/1142)
- The Misuse of Drugs (Designation) (Amendment) (England, Wales and Scotland) Order (SI 2010/1143)
- The Misuse of Drugs (Amendment) (England, Wales and Scotland) Regulations (SI 2010/1144)
- The Pensions Act 2008 (Commencement 7 and Saving, Consequential and Incidental Provisions) Order (SI 2010/1145)
- The Safeguarding Vulnerable Groups Act 2006 (Controlled Activity and Miscellaneous Provisions) Regulations (SI 2010/1146)
- The Welsh Ministers (Transfer of Property, Rights and Liabilities) (Wales) Order (SI 2010/1147)
- The Local Education Authorities and Children's Services Authorities (Integration of Functions) (Wales) Order (SI 2010/1148)
- The Financial Assistance Scheme (Miscellaneous Amendments) Regulations (SI 2010/1149)
- The Cosmetic Products (Safety) (Amendment) Regulations (SI 2010/1150)
- The Apprenticeships, Skills, Children and Learning Act 2009 (Commencement 3 and Transitional and Transitory Provisions) and (Commencement 2 (Amendment)) Order (SI 2010/1151)
- The Representation of the People (Timing of the Canvass) (Northern Ireland) Order (SI 2010/1152)
- The Rehabilitation of Offenders Act 1974 (Exceptions) (Amendment) (England and Wales) Order (SI 2010/1153)
- The Safeguarding Vulnerable Groups Act 2006 (Regulated Activity, Devolution and Miscellaneous Provisions) Order (SI 2010/1154)
- The Waste Electrical and Electronic Equipment (Amendment) Regulations (SI 2010/1155)
- The Education (Educational Provision for Improving Behaviour) Regulations (SI 2010/1156)
- The Environmental Civil Sanctions (England) Order (SI 2010/1157)
- The Local Education Authorities and Children's Services Authorities (Integration of Functions) Order (SI 2010/1158)
- The Environmental Civil Sanctions (Miscellaneous Amendments) (England) Regulations (SI 2010/1159)
- The Social Security (Loss of Benefit) Amendment Regulations (SI 2010/1160)
- The Social Fund Winter Fuel Payment (Temporary Increase) Regulations (SI 2010/1161)
- The A46 Trunk Road (Whisby, Lincolnshire) (Temporary 40 Miles Per Hour Speed Restriction) Order (SI 2010/1162)
- The A52 Trunk Road (Nottingham) (Temporary Prohibition of Traffic) Order (SI 2010/1163)
- The A50 Trunk Road (Sawley Interchange, Leicestershire) (Eastbound Exit Slip Road) (Temporary Prohibition of Traffic) Order (SI 2010/1164)
- The M1 Motorway (Junction 21, Leicestershire) (Southbound Exit Slip Road) (Temporary Prohibition of Traffic) Order (SI 2010/1165)
- The A36 Trunk Road (Black Dog Hill, Warminster, Wiltshire) (Layby Closure) (Experimental) Order (SI 2010/1166)
- The A1 Trunk Road (Cheswick to East Ord) (Temporary Restriction and Prohibition of Traffic) Order (SI 2010/1167)
- The A12 Trunk Road (Junction 33, Copdock Mill Interchange, Suffolk to Junction 12, Marylands Interchange, Essex) (Prohibition of Entry) Order (SI 2010/1168)
- The A14 Trunk Road (Ipswich Western Bypass, Suffolk) (Prohibition of Entry) Order (SI 2010/1169)
- The A5 Trunk Road (High Street North, Dunstable, Bedfordshire) (Bus Lane) ( 2) Order (SI 2010/1170)
- The Safeguarding Vulnerable Groups Act 2006 (Controlled Activity) (Wales) Regulations (SI 2010/1171)
- The Local Education Authorities and Children's Services Authorities (Integration of Functions) (Local and Subordinate Legislation) Order (SI 2010/1172)
- The Children's Centres (Inspections) Regulations (SI 2010/1173)
- The Designation of Schools Having a Religious Character (Independent Schools) (England) Order (SI 2010/1174)
- The European Parliamentary Elections (Northern Ireland) (Amendment) Regulations (SI 2010/1175)
- The Ecclesiastical Exemption (Listed Buildings and Conservation Areas) (England) Order (SI 2010/1176)
- The Offshore Installations (Safety Zones) Order (SI 2010/1177)
- The Electoral Law Act (Northern Ireland) 1962 (Amendment) Order (SI 2010/1178)
- The Concessionary Bus Travel Act 2007 (Variation of Reimbursement and Other Administrative Arrangements) Order (SI 2010/1179)
- The Identity Cards Act 2006 (Provision of Information with Consent) Regulations 2009 (Amendment) Regulations (SI 2010/1180)
- The Criminal Defence Service (Funding) (Amendment 2) Order (SI 2010/1181)
- The Medical Profession (Miscellaneous Amendments) Order 2008 (Commencement 3) Order of Council (SI 2010/1182)
- The Criminal Justice Act 2003 (Commencement 24 and Transitional Provisions) Order (SI 2010/1183)
- The Criminal Defence Service (Information Requests) (Amendment) Regulations (SI 2010/1184)
- The Value Added Tax (Small Non-Commercial Consignments) Relief (Amendment) Order (SI 2010/1185)
- The Criminal Defence Service (Representation Orders: Appeals etc.) (Amendment) Regulations (SI 2010/1186)
- The Financial Assistance Scheme (Tax) Regulations (SI 2010/1187)
- The Building Societies (Financial Assistance) Order (SI 2010/1188)
- The Building Societies (Insolvency and Special Administration) (Amendment) Order (SI 2010/1189)
- The Financial Services and Markets Act 2000 (Liability of Issuers) Regulations (SI 2010/1192)
- The Financial Services and Markets Act 2000 (Amendments to Part 18A etc.) Regulations (SI 2010/1193)
- The Royal Parks and Other Open Spaces (Amendment) etc. Regulations (SI 2010/1194)
- The Seeds (National Lists of Varieties) (Amendment) Regulations (SI 2010/1195)
- The M60 Motorway (Junctions 6–8 Clockwise and Anticlockwise Entry and Exit Slip Roads and Dedicated Slip Roads) (Temporary Prohibition of Traffic) Order (SI 2010/1196)
- The Al-Qaida and Taliban (Asset-Freezing) Regulations (SI 2010/1197)
- The M60 Motorway (Junctions 22-20 Anticlockwise Carriageway and Junction 21 Slip Roads) (Temporary Prohibition of Traffic) Order (SI 2010/1198)
- The M62 Motorway (Junctions 10 – 9 Westbound Carriageway and M6 Motorway Northbound Link Road to M62 Westbound and Junction 9 Westbound Exit Slip Road) (Temporary Restriction and Prohibition of Traffic) Order (SI 2010/1199)
- The M20 Motorway (Junctions 4 – 8) (Temporary Prohibition of Traffic) Order (SI 2010/1200)

== 1201–1300 ==
- The A30 Trunk Road (M25 Junction 13, Link Road) (Temporary Prohibition of Traffic) Order (SI 2010/1201)
- The A21 Trunk Road (Scotney Castle Roundabout – Stonecrouch) (Temporary Speed Restrictions) Order (SI 2010/1202)
- The Motor Vehicles (Driving Licences) (Amendment) Regulations (SI 2010/1203)
- The Commons Councils (Standard Constitution) (England) Regulations (SI 2010/1204)
- The Parental Orders (Prescribed Particulars and Forms of Entry) Regulations (SI 2010/1205)
- The Damages-Based Agreements Regulations (SI 2010/1206)
- The Misuse of Drugs Act 1971 (Amendment) Order (SI 2010/1207)
- The National Assembly for Wales (Legislative Competence) (Transport) Order (SI 2010/1208)
- The National Assembly for Wales (Legislative Competence) (Education) Order (SI 2010/1209)
- The National Assembly for Wales (Legislative Competence) (Housing) (Fire Safety) Order (SI 2010/1210)
- The National Assembly for Wales (Legislative Competence) (Local Government) Order (SI 2010/1211)
- The National Assembly for Wales (Legislative Competence) (Culture and Other Fields) Order (SI 2010/1212)
- The Children Act 2004 Information Database (England) (Amendment) Regulations (SI 2010/1213)
- The Bristol Port Health Authority Order (SI 2010/1214)
- The Cornwall Port Health Authority Order (SI 2010/1215)
- The Cowes Port Health Authority Order (SI 2010/1216)
- The Portsmouth Port Health Authority Order (SI 2010/1217)
- The Southampton Port Health Authority Order (SI 2010/1218)
- The Charities (Disclosure of Revenue and Customs Information to the Charity Commission for Northern Ireland) Regulations (SI 2010/1219)
- The Town and Country Planning (Compensation) ( 2) (England) Regulations (SI 2010/1220)
- The Pensions Act 2008 (Commencement 8) Order (SI 2010/1221)
- The Jobseeker's Allowance (Work for Your Benefit Pilot Scheme) Regulations (SI 2010/1222)
- The Criminal Procedure and Investigations Act 1996 (Code of Practice for Interviews of Witnesses Notified by Accused) Order (SI 2010/1223)
- The M4 Motorway (Junction 5 – West of Junction 14, Carriageways) (Temporary Restriction of Traffic) Order (SI 2010/1224)
- The A27 Trunk Road (Lewes Road, Near Polegate) (Temporary Restriction and Prohibition of Traffic) Order (SI 2010/1225)
- The Civil Aviation (Working Time) (Amendment) Regulations (SI 2010/1226)
- The M4 Motorway (Junctions 1 – 3) (Temporary Prohibition of Traffic) Order (SI 2010/1227)
- The Merchant Shipping (Ship-to-Ship Transfers) Regulations (SI 2010/1228)
- The A303 Trunk Road (Picket Twenty Interchange – Winchester Road Interchange) (Temporary Restriction and Prohibition of Traffic) Order (SI 2010/1229)
- The A27 Trunk Road (Holmbush Interchange to Hangleton) (Temporary Prohibition of Traffic) Order (SI 2010/1230)
- The M40 Motorway and the A40 Trunk Road (M40 Junction 1) (Temporary Prohibition of Traffic) Order (SI 2010/1231)
- The M1 Motorway (Junctions 1 – 4, Slip Roads) (Temporary Prohibition of Traffic) Order (SI 2010/1232)
- The A21 Trunk Road (Quarry Hill Interchange) (Temporary Restriction and Prohibition of Traffic) Order (SI 2010/1233)
- The A1 Trunk Road (Lobley Hill Interchange to Eighton Lodge Interchange) (Temporary Prohibition of Traffic) Order (SI 2010/1234)
- The A1 Trunk Road (Kingsway Interchange to Lobley Hill Interchange) (Temporary Prohibition of Traffic) Order (SI 2010/1235)
- The A69 Trunk Road (Newcastle upon Tyne to Carlisle) (Temporary 50 Miles Per Hour, 40 Miles Per Hour and 10 Miles Per Hour Speed Restriction) Order (SI 2010/1236)
- The National Health Service (Travelling Expenses and Remission of Charges) (Wales) (Amendment) Regulations (SI 2010/1237)
- The A1(M) Motorway and the A64 Trunk Road (Bramham Crossroads) (Temporary Prohibition of Traffic) Order (SI 2010/1238)
- The A4 Trunk Road and A46 Trunk Road (London Road Junction, Bath) (Temporary Prohibition of Traffic) Order (SI 2010/1239)
- The M5 Motorway (Junctions 21, 22 & 23 Slip Roads) (Temporary Prohibition and Restriction of Traffic) Order (SI 2010/1240)
- The M4 Motorway (Junction 19 Westbound Entry Slip Road) (Temporary Prohibition of Traffic) Order (SI 2010/1241)
- The M5 Motorway (Junctions 28 and 29 Slip Roads) (Temporary Prohibition and Restriction of Traffic) Order (SI 2010/1242)
- The M5 Motorway (Junction 15) and M4 Motorway (Junction 20) (Almondsbury Interchange Slip Roads) (Temporary Prohibition of Traffic) Order (SI 2010/1243)
- The M5 Motorway (Junctions 18 & 18A Slip Roads) (Temporary Restriction of Traffic) Order (SI 2010/1244)
- The M5 Motorway (Junction 10 Slip Roads) (Temporary Prohibition of Traffic) Order (SI 2010/1245)
- The M32 Motorway (Junction 2 Slip Roads) (Temporary Prohibition of Traffic) Order (SI 2010/1246)
- The M4 Motorway (Junction 22 Slip Roads) (Temporary Prohibition of Traffic) Order (SI 2010/1247)
- The M48 Motorway (Junction 1 Slip Roads) (Temporary Prohibition of Traffic) Order (SI 2010/1248)
- The M5 Motorway (Junctions 11A-12 Slip Roads) (Temporary Prohibition of Traffic) Order (SI 2010/1249)
- The M5 Motorway (Junctions 19 and 20 Slip Roads) (Temporary Prohibition of Traffic) Order (SI 2010/1250)
- The A35 Trunk Road (Kings Road, Honiton, Devon) (Restriction) Order (SI 2010/1251)
- The Trunk Roads (40 M. P. H. Speed Limit) ( 15) Order 1968 (Revocation) Order (SI 2010/1252)
- The M4 Motorway (Junction 15 – West of Junction 14) (Temporary Restriction and Prohibition of Traffic) Order (SI 2010/1253)
- The A12 Trunk Road (Junction 25 Marks Tey Interchange to Junction 26 Eight Ash Green Interchange, Essex) (Temporary Prohibition of Traffic) Order (SI 2010/1254)
- The A404(M) Motorway (Junction 9b – M4 Junction 8/9) (Temporary Restriction and Prohibition of Traffic) Order (SI 2010/1255)
- The A2 Trunk Road (Gate Services) (Temporary Restriction and Prohibition of Traffic) Order (SI 2010/1256)
- The A120 Trunk Road (Horsley Cross Roundabout to Crown Interchange, Essex) (Temporary Prohibition of Traffic) Order (SI 2010/1257)
- The M11 Motorway (Junction 8 to Junction 9, Essex) (Prohibition of Heavy Commercial Vehicles) (Experimental) Order (SI 2010/1258)
- The A47 Trunk Road (Paston Parkway Interchange Junction 20 to Eye Road Roundabout, Peterborough) (Temporary Prohibition of Traffic) Order (SI 2010/1259)
- The A1(M) Motorway and the A1 Trunk Road (Junction 9 Hertfordshire and Junction 10 Bedfordshire) (Temporary Restriction and Prohibition of Traffic) Order (SI 2010/1260)
- The A1(M) Motorway (Junction 45, Grange Moor) (Temporary Prohibition of Traffic) Order (SI 2010/1261)
- The A1 Trunk Road (Lobley Hill Interchange to Dunston Interchange) (Temporary Restriction and Prohibition of Traffic) Order (SI 2010/1262)
- The A1 Trunk Road (Shilbottle to North Charlton) (Temporary Restriction and Prohibition of Traffic) Order (SI 2010/1263)
- The M4 Motorway (Junctions 15–16) (Temporary Restriction of Traffic) Order (SI 2010/1265)
- The A52 Trunk Road (Saxondale, Nottinghamshire) (Temporary Restriction and Prohibition of Traffic) Order (SI 2010/1266)
- The M54 Motorway (Junction 4, Telford, Shropshire) (Temporary Prohibition of Traffic) Order (SI 2010/1267)
- The M62 Motorway Junction 10 (Westbound and Eastbound Link Roads to the M6 Northbound) (Temporary Prohibition of Traffic) Order (SI 2010/1269)
- The M56 Motorway (Junction 9, Eastbound Link Road to the M6 Motorway Northbound) (Temporary Prohibition of Traffic) Order (SI 2010/1270)
- The A45 Trunk Road (Raunds Roundabout to Stanwick Roundabout, Northamptonshire) (Temporary Prohibition of Traffic) Order (SI 2010/1272)
- The A40 Trunk Road (Ganarew, Herefordshire) (Temporary 10 Miles Per Hour and 40 Miles Per Hour Speed Restriction) Order (SI 2010/1273)
- The A46 Trunk Road (Winthorpe to Thorpe on the Hill) (Temporary Restriction and Prohibition of Traffic) Order (SI 2010/1274)
- The A446 Trunk Road (M6 Junction 4 to Chester Road) (Temporary Prohibition of Traffic) Order (SI 2010/1276)
- The Constitutional Reform and Governance Act 2010 (Commencement 1) Order (SI 2010/1277)
- The Parliamentary Standards Act 2009 (Commencement 4) Order (SI 2010/1278)
- The M5 Motorway (Junctions 4a – 5) and the M42 Motorway (Temporary Prohibition of Traffic) Order (SI 2010/1279)
- The M1 and M69 Motorways (M1 Junction 21, Leicestershire) (Link Road) (Temporary Prohibition of Traffic) Order (SI 2010/1280)
- The M60 Motorway (Junction 13 Clockwise and Anticlockwise Entry Slip Roads) (Temporary Prohibition of Traffic) Order (SI 2010/1281)
- The M6 Motorway (Junctions 25–27, Northbound and Southbound Carriageways and Junction 26 Slip Roads) (Temporary Prohibition and Restriction of Traffic) Order (SI 2010/1283)
- The A66 Trunk Road (Dacre Junction to Newbiggin Junction) (Temporary Restriction and Prohibition of Traffic) Order (SI 2010/1284)
- The A2 Trunk Road (Bean – Ebbsfleet) (Temporary Restriction and Prohibition of Traffic) Order (SI 2010/1285)
- The M25 Motorway and M4 Motorway (M25 Junction 15) (Temporary Prohibition of Traffic) Order (SI 2010/1286)
- The A2 Trunk Road and the M2 Motorway (Junctions 1 – 4, Slip Roads) (Temporary Prohibition of Traffic) Order (SI 2010/1287)
- The M2 Motorway (Junctions 6 – 7) (Temporary Restriction and Prohibition of Traffic) Order (SI 2010/1288)
- The M2 Motorway (Junctions 5 – 7, Slip Roads) (Temporary Prohibition of Traffic) Order (SI 2010/1289)
- The M4 Motorway (Junction 11) (Temporary Restriction and Prohibition of Traffic) Order (SI 2010/1290)
- The Safeguarding Vulnerable Groups Act 2006 (Prescribed Period and Appropriate Officer) (Wales) Regulations (SI 2010/1291)
- The A12 Trunk Road (Pasteur Road Roundabout to Victoria Road Roundabout, Great Yarmouth, Norfolk) (Temporary Prohibition of Traffic) Order (SI 2010/1292)
- The A259 Trunk Road (Near Rye) (Temporary Prohibition of Traffic) Order (SI 2010/1293)
- The A34 Trunk Road (Kidlington, Southbound Carriageway) (Temporary Speed Restriction) Order (SI 2010/1294)
- The M48 Motorway (Junctions 1 – 2) (Severn Bridge) (Temporary Prohibition of Traffic) Order (SI 2010/1295)
- The A20 Trunk Road and the M20 Motorway (Junctions 9 – 13, Slip Roads) (Temporary Prohibition of Traffic) Order (SI 2010/1296)
- The A12 Trunk Road (Vauxhall Roundabout to Pasteur Road Roundabout Great Yarmouth) and the A47 Trunk Road (Old Road Roundabout Acle to Vauxhall Roundabout Great Yarmouth) (Norfolk) (Temporary Prohibition of Traffic) Order (SI 2010/1297)
- The A23 Trunk Road (Pyecombe, Southbound Lay-By) (Temporary Prohibition of Traffic) Order (SI 2010/1298)
- The A13 Trunk Road (Wennington Interchange – Baker Street Interchange) (Temporary Restriction and Prohibition of Traffic) Order (SI 2010/1299)
- The A249 Trunk Road (M2 Junction 5 – Queenborough) (Temporary Prohibition of Traffic) Order (SI 2010/1300)

== 1301–1400 ==
- The M25 Motorway (Junctions 25 – 27) (Temporary Prohibition of Traffic) Order (SI 2010/1301)
- The M180/M181 Motorways (Midmoor Interchange) (Temporary Restriction and Prohibition of Traffic) Order (SI 2010/1302)
- The A1(M) Motorway (Junction 59 to Junction 60) (Temporary Restriction and Prohibition of Traffic) Order (SI 2010/1303)
- The A63 Trunk Road (Garrison Road, Hull) (Temporary Prohibition of Traffic and Pedestrians) Order (SI 2010/1304)
- The M60 Motorway Junction 18 (Clockwise Link Road to the M66 Motorway Northbound) (Temporary Prohibition of Traffic) Order (SI 2010/1305)
- The M66 Motorway Junction 4 (Southbound Link Road to the M62 Motorway Eastbound) (Temporary Prohibition of Traffic) Order (SI 2010/1306)
- The M60 Motorway (Junction 16 Clockwise Entry Slip Road) (Temporary Prohibition of Traffic) Order (SI 2010/1307)
- The M60 Motorway (Junction 27, Clockwise Entry Slip Road) (Temporary Prohibition of Traffic) ( 3) Order (SI 2010/1308)
- The M67 Motorway (Junction 3 Westbound Entry Slip Road) (Temporary Prohibition of Traffic) Order (SI 2010/1309)
- The M5 Motorway (Junctions 13–14) (Temporary Restriction of Traffic) Order (SI 2010/1310)
- The M32 Motorway (Junction 1 Southbound Entry Slip Road) (Temporary Prohibition of Traffic) Order (SI 2010/1311)
- The M6 Motorway (Junctions 32 – 34 Northbound and Southbound Carriageways) (Temporary Prohibition and Restriction of Traffic) Order (SI 2010/1312)
- The M6 Motorway (Junction 31 Northbound and Southbound Exit and Entry Slip Roads) (Temporary Prohibition of Traffic) Order (SI 2010/1313)
- The M5 Motorway (Junctions 11A-12) (Temporary Restriction of Traffic) Order (SI 2010/1314)
- The A45 Trunk Road (Wootton, Northampton) (Slip Road) (Temporary Prohibition of Traffic) Order (SI 2010/1315)
- The A50 Trunk Road (Derby Southern Bypass) (Derby Services)(Eastbound Exit Slip Road) (Temporary Prohibition of Traffic) Order (SI 2010/1316)
- The Dormant Bank and Building Society Accounts Act 2008 (Prescribed Restrictions) (Wales) Order (SI 2010/1317)
- The A52 Trunk Road (QMC and Dunkirk Interchanges, Nottingham) (Temporary Prohibition of Traffic) Order (SI 2010/1318)
- The M1 Motorway (Junction 19) (Temporary Prohibition of Traffic) Order (SI 2010/1319)
- The A46 Trunk Road (Warwick Bypass) (Temporary Prohibition of Traffic) Order (SI 2010/1320)
- The M5 Motorway (Junctions 3 to 4) (Temporary Prohibition of Traffic) Order (SI 2010/1321)
- The M61 Motorway (Junction 3 Kearsley Spur Northbound Carriageway) (Temporary Prohibition of Traffic) Order (SI 2010/1322)
- The M25 Motorway and the A2 and the A282 Trunk Roads (Junction 2) (Temporary Prohibition of Traffic) Order (SI 2010/1323)
- The A34 Trunk Road (Three Maids Hill, Southbound Entry Slip Road) (Temporary Prohibition of Traffic) Order (SI 2010/1324)
- The A34 Trunk Road (Old Burghclere and Litchfield, Lay-Bys) (Temporary Prohibition of Traffic) Order (SI 2010/1325)
- The M25 and the M26 Motorways (Junctions 4 and 5) (Temporary Prohibition of Traffic) Order (SI 2010/1326)
- The M3 Motorway (Junction 10, Southbound) (Temporary Restriction and Prohibition of Traffic) Order (SI 2010/1327)
- The A1(M) Motorway (Junction 42, Selby Fork to Junction 43, Hook Moor) (Temporary Prohibition of Traffic) Order (SI 2010/1328)
- The Children and Young Persons Act 2008 (Commencement 4) (Wales) Order (SI 2010/1329)
- The A1(M) Motorway (Junction 46, Kirk Deighton) (Temporary Prohibition of Traffic) Order (SI 2010/1330)
- The M66 Motorway (Junction 3 Northbound and Southbound Entry and Exit Slip Roads) (Temporary Prohibition of Traffic) Order (SI 2010/1331)
- The M602 Motorway (Junction 2, Westbound and Eastbound Entry Slip Roads) (Temporary Prohibition of Traffic) Order (SI 2010/1332)
- The M6 Motorway (Junctions 33–34, Northbound Carriageway and Junction 34 Northbound Exit and Entry Slip Roads) (Temporary Prohibition and Restriction of Traffic) Order (SI 2010/1333)
- The M60 Motorway (Junction 25 Anticlockwise Entry Slip Road) (Temporary Prohibition of Traffic) Order (SI 2010/1334)
- The M602 Motorway (Junction 3, Westbound Entry Slip Road) (Temporary Prohibition of Traffic) Order (SI 2010/1335)
- The A12 Trunk Road (Bascule Bridge, Lowestoft, Suffolk) (Temporary Prohibition of Traffic) Order (SI 2010/1336)
- The M27 Motorway (Junctions 4 & 5) (Temporary Prohibition of Traffic) Order (SI 2010/1337)
- The M20 Motorway (Junction 10, Londonbound) (Temporary Restriction and Prohibition of Traffic) Order (SI 2010/1339)
- The A69 Trunk Road (West Denton Interchange to Denton Burn Interchange) (Temporary Prohibition of Traffic) Order (SI 2010/1340)
- The M5 Motorway (Junction 11 Southbound Exit Slip Road) (Temporary Prohibition of Traffic) Order (SI 2010/1341)
- The A1033 Trunk Road (Salt End Roundabout) (Temporary Prohibition of Traffic) Order (SI 2010/1342)
- The M5 Motorway (Junction 11 Southbound Exit Slip Road) (Temporary Prohibition of Traffic) (Number 2) Order (SI 2010/1343)
- The M60 Motorway (Entry Slip Road Leading from the Roundabout at Junction 18 to the M66 Northbound) (Temporary Prohibition of Traffic) Order (SI 2010/1344)
- The M60 Motorway (Junction 18, Anticlockwise Entry Slip Road) (Temporary Prohibition of Traffic) Order (SI 2010/1345)
- The M67 Motorway (Junctions 1–4 Eastbound and Westbound Entry Slip Roads) (Temporary Prohibition of Traffic) Order (SI 2010/1346)
- The M57 Motorway (Junction 3 Northbound Entry Slip Road) (Temporary Prohibition of Traffic) Order (SI 2010/1347)
- The Trunk Roads (40 M. P. H. Speed Limit) ( 39) Order 1967 (Revocation) Order (SI 2010/1348)
- The Trunk Roads (40 M. P. H. Speed Limit) ( 34) Order 1968 (Revocation) Order (SI 2010/1349)
- The A38 Trunk Road (Carkeel Roundabout) (40 M.P.H. Speed Limit) Order 1991 (Revocation) Order (SI 2010/1350)
- The A38 Trunk Road (Landrake to Stoketon Cross) (50 Miles Per Hour Speed Limit) Order 1999 (Revocation) Order (SI 2010/1351)
- The A38 Trunk Road (Trerulefoot Roundabout to Carkeel Roundabout, Cornwall) (40 and 50 MPH Speed Restrictions) Order 2005 (Revocation) Order (SI 2010/1352)
- The A38 Trunk Road (Trerulefoot Roundabout to Carkeel Roundabout, Cornwall) (40 mph and 50 mph Speed Limits) and (De-restriction) Order (SI 2010/1353)
- The Air Navigation (Restriction of Flying) (West Wales Airport) (Amendment) Regulations 2010 (SI 2010/1354)
- The Criminal Defence Service (Funding) (Amendment 3) Order (SI 2010/1358)
- The A160/A180 Trunk Roads (Brocklesby Interchange) (Temporary Restriction and Prohibition of Traffic) Order (SI 2010/1359)
- The Meat (Official Controls Charges) (Wales) (Amendment) Regulations (SI 2010/1360)
- The Census (Wales) Regulations (SI 2010/1361)
- The M11 Motorway (Junction 12, Cambridgeshire) (Temporary Prohibition of Traffic) Order (SI 2010/1363)
- The A45 Trunk Road (Stretton-on-Dunsmore to Thurlaston) (Temporary Restriction and Prohibition of Traffic) Order (SI 2010/1364)
- The A5 Trunk Road (Between Preston Roundabout and M54 Junction 7) (Temporary Restriction and Prohibition of Traffic) Order (SI 2010/1365)
- The A405 Trunk Road (M1 Junction 6) (Temporary Prohibition of Traffic) Order (SI 2010/1366)
- The M25 Motorway and the A282 Trunk Road (Junctions 29 & 30) (Temporary Restriction of Traffic) Order (SI 2010/1367)
- The Gower College Swansea (Incorporation) Order (SI 2010/1368)
- The Gower College Swansea Further Education Corporation (Government) Regulations (SI 2010/1369)
- The M62 Motorway (Junction 11 Westbound Entry Slip Road) (Temporary Prohibition of Traffic) Order (SI 2010/1370)
- The A66 Trunk Road (East Browson to Carkin Moor) (Temporary Restriction and Prohibition of Traffic) Order (SI 2010/1371)
- The M60 Motorway Junction 12 (Clockwise and Anticlockwise Link Roads to the M602 Eastbound and the M62 Westbound) and the M602 (Temporary Prohibition of Traffic) Order (SI 2010/1372)
- The Air Navigation (Restriction of Flying) (Lodway) Regulations 2010 (SI 2010/1373)
- The M6 Motorway (Junction 22 Southbound Entry Slip Road) (Temporary Prohibition of Traffic) Order (SI 2010/1374)
- The Policing and Crime Act 2009 (Commencement 1) (Wales) Order (SI 2010/1375)
- The Food (Jelly Mini-Cups) (Emergency Control) (Wales) (Amendment) Regulations (SI 2010/1376)
- The A47 Trunk Road (West of Low Road, Hockering to Hall Drive, Honingham, Norfolk) (Temporary Restriction and Prohibition of Traffic) Order (SI 2010/1377)
- The M60 Motorway (Junctions 19 – 23 Clockwise and Anticlockwise Carriageways and Slip Roads) and M66 Motorway (Southbound Carriageway) (Temporary Prohibition and Restriction of Traffic) Order (SI 2010/1378)
- The Tuberculosis (Wales) Order (SI 2010/1379)
- The M621 Motorway (Junction 1 to Junction 7) (Temporary Prohibition of Traffic) Order (SI 2010/1380)
- The A38 Trunk Road (Catholme, Staffordshire) (Slip Road) (Temporary Prohibition of Traffic) Order (SI 2010/1381)
- The A50 Trunk Road (Stanley Matthews Way, Stoke-on-Trent, Staffordshire) (Slip Roads) (Temporary Prohibition of Traffic) Order (SI 2010/1382)
- The A46 Trunk Road (Warwick Bypass) (Link Road) (Temporary Prohibition of Traffic) Order (SI 2010/1383)
- The Private Water Supplies (Wales) (Amendment) ( 2) Regulations (SI 2010/1384)
- The M6 Toll Motorway (East of Junction T8) (Temporary Prohibition of Traffic) Order (SI 2010/1385)
- The A49 Trunk Road (Moreton on Lugg, Herefordshire) (Temporary 10 Miles Per Hour and 40 Miles Per Hour Speed Restriction) Order (SI 2010/1386)
- The A5 Trunk Road (Tamworth, Staffordshire) (Slip Road) (Temporary Prohibition of Traffic) Order (SI 2010/1387)
- The M6 Toll Motorway (North of M6 Junction 3a) (Temporary Prohibition of Traffic) Order (SI 2010/1388)
- The M42 Motorway (Junction 6 – Junction 7A) (Temporary Prohibition of Traffic) Order (SI 2010/1389)
- The A38 Trunk Road (Alfreton, Derbyshire) (Temporary Restriction and Prohibition of Traffic) Order (SI 2010/1390)
- The M50 Motorway (M5 Junction 8 – M50 Junction 2) (Temporary Prohibition of Traffic) Order (SI 2010/1391)
- The A46 Trunk Road and the M6 and M69 Motorways (M6 Junction 2, Warwickshire) (Temporary Restriction and Prohibition of Traffic) Order (SI 2010/1392)
- The A249 Trunk Road (Queenborough Junction – Whiteways Roundabout) (Temporary Prohibition of Traffic) Order (SI 2010/1393)
- The A303 Trunk Road (Bullington Cross, Westbound) (Temporary Restriction and Prohibition of Traffic) Order (SI 2010/1394)
- The Policing and Crime Act 2009 (Transitional and Saving Provisions)(Wales) Order (SI 2010/1395)
- The A47 Trunk Road (Swaffham Bypass, Lynn Road Junction to Long Lane Underbridge, Norfolk) (Temporary Restriction and Prohibition of Traffic) Order (SI 2010/1396)
- The A34 Trunk Road (Milton Interchange and Marcham Interchange, Lay-Bys) (Temporary Prohibition of Traffic) Order (SI 2010/1397)
- The M11 Motorway (Junctions 8 – 9) (Ring Hill Bridge, Saffron Walden, Essex) (Temporary Restriction and Prohibition of Traffic) Order (SI 2010/1398)
- The A1 and A421 Trunk Roads (Black Cat Roundabout Chawston to A428 Wyboston, Bedfordshire) (Temporary Restriction and Prohibition of Traffic and Pedestrians) Order (SI 2010/1399)
- The A31 Trunk Road (Picket Post Interchange, Eastbound Lay-By) (Temporary Prohibition of Traffic) Order (SI 2010/1400)

== 1401–1500 ==
- The M11 Motorway (Junction 4, Link Roads) (Temporary Prohibition of Traffic) Order (SI 2010/1401)
- The A1(M) Motorway (Junction 35, Wadworth Interchange) (Temporary Restriction and Prohibition of Traffic) Order (SI 2010/1402)
- The M32 Motorway (Junctions 2–3) (Temporary Prohibition of Traffic) Order (SI 2010/1403)
- The M11 Motorway (Junction 11, Cambridgeshire) Slip Roads (Temporary Restriction of Traffic) Order (SI 2010/1404)
- The A56 Trunk Road (Rising Bridge to Bent Gate) (Temporary Prohibition of Traffic) Order (SI 2010/1405)
- The M6 Motorway (Junction 16, Southbound Exit Slip Road) (Temporary Prohibition of Traffic) ( 2) Order (SI 2010/1406)
- The A1(M) Motorway and the M62 Motorway (Holmfield Interchange) (Temporary Restriction and Prohibition of Traffic) Order (SI 2010/1407)
- The A19 Trunk Road (Chester Road Interchange to Hylton Grange Interchange) (Temporary Restriction and Prohibition of Traffic) Order (SI 2010/1408)
- The A46 Trunk Road (Widmerpool to Newark-on-Trent) (Temporary Restriction and Prohibition of Traffic) Order (SI 2010/1409)
- The Marine and Coastal Access Act 2009 (Consequential Provisions) (Wales) Order (SI 2010/1410)
- The M53 Motorway (Junction 1, Northbound and Southbound Carriageways and Southbound Entry Slip Road) (Temporary Prohibition and Restriction of Traffic) Order (SI 2010/1411)
- The M6 Motorway (Junctions 32–37, Northbound Carriageway and Junction 35 Northbound Entry Slip Road) (Temporary Prohibition and Restriction of Traffic) Order (SI 2010/1412)
- The M5 Motorway (Junction 28) (Temporary Prohibition and Restriction of Traffic) Order (SI 2010/1413)
- The A69 Trunk Road (Haydon Bridge Bypass) (Derestriction) Order (SI 2010/1414)
- The A43 Trunk Road (Brackley to Syresham, Northamptonshire) (Temporary Prohibition of Traffic) Order (SI 2010/1415)
- The Air Navigation (Restriction of Flying) (Lodway) (Revocation) Regulations 2010 (SI 2010/1416)
- The Air Navigation (Restriction of Flying) (State Opening of Parliament) Regulations 2010 (SI 2010/1417)
- THE A46 TRUNK ROAD (M40 JUNCTION 15, WARWICKSHIRE) (24 HOURS CLEARWAY) ORDER (SI 2010/1418)
- The A45 Trunk Road (Between Raunds and Thrapston, Northamptonshire) (Temporary Prohibition of Traffic) Order (SI 2010/1419)
- The M5 Motorway (Junction 1 to M6 Junction 8) (Temporary Restriction and Prohibition of Traffic) Order (SI 2010/1420)
- The A14 Trunk Road (Kettering, Northamptonshire) (Temporary Restriction and Prohibition of Traffic) Order (SI 2010/1421)
- The A1 Trunk Road (Little Ponton to South Witham, Lincolnshire) (Temporary Restriction and Prohibition of Traffic) Order (SI 2010/1422)
- The M3 Motorway (Junctions 7 – 9, Southbound) (Temporary Prohibition of Traffic) Order (SI 2010/1423)
- The A27 Trunk Road (Langstone Interchange, Slip Roads) (Temporary Prohibition of Traffic) Order (SI 2010/1424)
- The A23 Trunk Road (London Road North/Brighton Road, Hooley) (Temporary Restriction and Prohibition of Traffic) Order 2010 Variation Order (SI 2010/1425)
- The A1(M) Motorway (Letchworth Road Bridge Junction 9, Hertfordshire to Junction 10, Bedfordshire) (Temporary Prohibition of Traffic) Order (SI 2010/1426)
- The A47 Trunk Road (Swaffham Road Junction, Narborough to Swaffham Interchange, Norfolk) (Temporary Prohibition of Traffic) Order (SI 2010/1427)
- The M11 Motorway (Junction 6 – 7 Northbound, Harlow, Essex) (Temporary Restriction and Prohibition of Traffic) Order (SI 2010/1428)
- The A1 Trunk Road (Layby at Skeeby) (Temporary Prohibition of Traffic) Order (SI 2010/1429)
- The M62 Motorway (Junction 26 to Junction 27) and the M621 Motorway (Gildersome Interchange) (Temporary Restriction and Prohibition of Traffic) Order (SI 2010/1430)
- The M62 Motorway (Junction 38, North Cave) (Temporary Prohibition of Traffic) Order (SI 2010/1431)
- The M25 Motorway (Junctions 20 – 22) (Temporary Restriction and Prohibition of Traffic) Order (SI 2010/1432)
- The Air Quality Standards (Wales) Regulations (SI 2010/1433)
- The A30 Trunk Road (Avers Junction, Redruth, to Callestick Crossroads, Cornwall) (Temporary Prohibition and Restriction of Traffic) Order (SI 2010/1434)
- The A38 Trunk Road (Carkeel Roundabout to Saltash Tunnel, Cornwall) (Temporary Prohibition of Traffic) Order (SI 2010/1435)
- The Education (Amendments Relating to the Intervals for the Inspection of Education and Training) (Wales) Regulations (SI 2010/1436)
- The M6 Motorway (Junction 20, Southbound Carriageway, Slip and Link Roads) (Temporary Prohibition and Restriction of Traffic) Order (SI 2010/1438)
- The M4 Motorway (Junction 18 Westbound Exit Slip Road) (Temporary Prohibition of Traffic) Order (SI 2010/1439)
- The A47 Trunk Road (Between Norwich and Great Yarmouth, Norfolk) (Temporary Restriction and Prohibition of Traffic) Order (SI 2010/1440)
- The A46 Trunk Road (Warwick Bypass) (Temporary Prohibition of Traffic) ( 2) Order (SI 2010/1441)
- The A38 Trunk Road (Junction with the A5148, Staffordshire) (Temporary Prohibition of Traffic) Order (SI 2010/1442)
- The A5 Trunk Road (North East of Rugby, Warwickshire) (Temporary Prohibition of Traffic) Order (SI 2010/1443)
- The A45 Trunk Road (Earls Barton, Northamptonshire) (Slip Roads) (Temporary Prohibition of Traffic) Order (SI 2010/1444)
- The M50 Motorway (Junction 2, Bury Court) (Temporary Restriction and Prohibition of Traffic) Order (SI 2010/1445)
- The M42 Motorway (Junction 4, Solihull) (Northbound Entry and Exit Slip Roads) (Temporary Prohibition of Traffic) Order (SI 2010/1446)
- The M42 Motorway (Junction 2) (Southbound Entry Slip Road) (Temporary Prohibition of Traffic) Order (SI 2010/1447)
- The M6 Motorway (Junction 4) (Southbound Exit Slip Road) (Temporary Prohibition of Traffic) Order (SI 2010/1448)
- The M42 Motorway (Junction 6, Solihull) (Northbound Entry Slip Road) (Temporary Prohibition of Traffic) Order (SI 2010/1449)
- The M42 Motorway (Junctions 4 – 7) (Temporary Restriction and Prohibition of Traffic) Order (SI 2010/1450)
- The Vale of Glamorgan (Communities) Order (SI 2010/1451)
- The M42 Motorway (Junction 6) (Slip Roads) (Temporary Prohibition of Traffic) Order (SI 2010/1452)
- The A23 Trunk Road (Slaugham, Northbound Lay-By) (Temporary Prohibition of Traffic) Order (SI 2010/1453)
- The A23 Trunk Road (Pease Pottage – Bolney) (Temporary Restriction and Prohibition of Traffic) Order (SI 2010/1454)
- The Home Information Pack (Suspension) Order (SI 2010/1455)
- The Energy Performance of Buildings (Certificates and Inspections) (England and Wales) (Amendment) Regulations (SI 2010/1456)
- The Health and Social Care Act 2008 (Commencement 3) (Wales) Order (SI 2010/1457)
- The A3 Trunk Road (Send Interchange – Stoke Interchange) (Temporary Restriction and Prohibition of Traffic) Order (SI 2010/1458)
- The Civil Enforcement of Parking Contraventions (City and County of Cardiff) Designation Order (SI 2010/1461)
- The Newlyn Pier and Harbour Revision (Constitution) Order (SI 2010/1462)
- The M4 Motorway (West of Junction 12) (Temporary Restriction of Traffic) Order (SI 2010/1463)
- The A47 Trunk Road (King's Lynn Southern Bypass, Pullover Interchange to Hardwick Interchange, Norfolk) (Temporary Restriction and Prohibition of Traffic) Order (SI 2010/1464)
- The M40 Motorway (Junction 1a, Buckinghamshire) Eastbound Exit Slip Road (Temporary Prohibition of Traffic) Order (SI 2010/1465)
- The A3 Trunk Road (Gravel Hill – Weston Interchange, Northbound Carriageway) (Temporary Restriction of Traffic) Order (SI 2010/1466)
- The A19 Trunk Road (Testos Roundabout to Seaton Burn Interchange Roundabout) (Temporary Restriction and Prohibition of Traffic) Order (SI 2010/1468)
- The A1 Trunk Road (Eighton Lodge Interchange to Seaton Burn Interchange) (Temporary 50 Miles Per Hour Speed Restriction) Order (SI 2010/1469)
- The A696 Trunk Road (Black Callerton Lane Interchange to Kenton Bankfoot Interchange) (Temporary Restriction and Prohibition of Traffic) Order (SI 2010/1470)
- The A19 Trunk Road (Osmotherley Interchange to Crathorne Interchange) (Temporary Restriction and Prohibition of Traffic) Order (SI 2010/1471)
- The A1(M) Motorway and the A64 Trunk Road (Bramham Crossroads) (Temporary Restriction and Prohibition of Traffic) Order (SI 2010/1472)
- The A34 Trunk Road (M3 Junction 9 – Tot Hill Interchange) (Temporary Restriction of Traffic) Order (SI 2010/1473)
- The A12 Trunk Road (Hatfield Peverel to Witham, Essex) (De-restriction) and (Revocation) Order (SI 2010/1474)
- The A69 Trunk Road (Oatens Bank Interchange to Hexham Road Interchange) (Temporary Restriction and Prohibition of Traffic) Order (SI 2010/1475)
- The A50 Trunk Road (Derby Southern Bypass, Derbyshire) (Temporary Prohibition of Traffic in Laybys) Order (SI 2010/1476)
- The A50 Trunk Road (Aston to Foston, Derbyshire) (Temporary Prohibition of Traffic in Laybys) Order (SI 2010/1477)
- The A46 Trunk Road (Aston Cross, Gloucestershire) (Temporary Prohibition of Traffic in Layby) Order (SI 2010/1478)
- The M5 Motorway (Junction 1, Sandwell) (Northbound Entry Slip Road) (Temporary Prohibition of Traffic) Order (SI 2010/1479)
- The A1 Trunk Road (North Muskham, Nottinghamshire) (Temporary Prohibition of Traffic) Order (SI 2010/1480)
- The A585 Trunk Road (Amounderness Way, Thornton) (Temporary Prohibition of Traffic) Order (SI 2010/1481)
- The M6 Motorway (Junctions 27–28, Northbound Carriageway and Junction 27 Northbound Entry Slip Road) (Temporary Prohibition and Restriction of Traffic) Order (SI 2010/1482)
- The Wireless Telegraphy (Automotive Short Range Radar) (Exemption) ( 2) (Amendment) Regulations (SI 2010/1484)
- The Safety of Sports Grounds (Designation) Order (SI 2010/1485)
- The M25 and M20 Motorways and the A20 Trunk Road (Swanley Interchange) (Temporary Prohibition of Traffic) Order (SI 2010/1486)
- The A3 Trunk Road (North of Sheet Interchange, Southbound Lay-By) (Temporary Prohibition of Traffic) Order (SI 2010/1487)
- The A2 Trunk Road (Near Canterbury, Eastbound) (Temporary Restriction and Prohibition of Traffic) Order (SI 2010/1488)
- The A27 Trunk Road (Fishbourne Roundabout – Whyke Road Roundabout, Eastbound Carriageway) (Temporary Restriction and Prohibition of Traffic) Order (SI 2010/1489)
- The A38 Trunk Road (Voss Farm Interchange, Near Plympton, Devon) (Slip Road Closure) Order (SI 2010/1490)
- The A1 Trunk Road and the A1(M) Motorway (Eighton Lodge Interchange to Birtley Interchange) (Temporary Restriction and Prohibition of Traffic) Order (SI 2010/1491)
- The Drinking Milk (Wales) Regulations (SI 2010/1492)
- The Water Resources (Control of Pollution) (Silage, Slurry and Agriculture Fuel Oil) (Wales) Regulations (SI 2010/1493)
- The Air Navigation (Restriction of Flying) (Trooping of the Colour) Regulations 2010 (SI 2010/1497)
- The Air Navigation (Restriction of Flying) (Sunderland) Regulations 2010 (SI 2010/1499)
- The A19/A168 Trunk Roads (Laybys between Asenby Interchange and Osmotherley Interchange) (Temporary Prohibition of Traffic) Order (SI 2010/1500)

== 1501–1600 ==
- The M62 Motorway (Junction 32, Castleford) (Temporary Restriction and Prohibition of Traffic) Order (SI 2010/1501)
- The A1(M) Motorway (Junction 36, Warmsworth) (Temporary Restriction and Prohibition of Traffic) Order (SI 2010/1502)
- The Blaenau Gwent (Communities) Order (SI 2010/1503)
- The Rail Passengers’ Rights and Obligations Regulations (SI 2010/1504)
- The A417 Trunk Road (A46 Shurdington Junction to Air Balloon Roundabout, Near Gloucester) (Temporary Prohibition and Restriction of Traffic) Order (SI 2010/1505)
- The M40 Motorway and the A34 Trunk Road (Junction 9) (Temporary Restriction and Prohibition of Traffic) Order (SI 2010/1506)
- The Non-Domestic Rating (Collection and Enforcement) (Local Lists) (Amendment) (England) Regulations (SI 2010/1507)
- The Council of the City of York (Hungate Bridge) Scheme 2009 Confirmation Instrument (SI 2010/1508)
- The A2 Trunk Road (Bridge – Lydden) (Temporary Restriction and Prohibition of Traffic) Order (SI 2010/1509)
- The Plant Health (England) (Amendment) Order (SI 2010/1510)
- The Seed Potatoes (England) (Amendment) Regulations (SI 2010/1511)
- The M4 Motorway (Rogiet Toll Plaza, Monmouthshire) (50 mph Speed Limit) Regulations (SI 2010/1512)
- The Energy Act 2008 (Consequential Modifications) (Offshore Environmental Protection) Order (SI 2010/1513)
- The Civil Enforcement of Parking Contraventions Designation ( 3) Order (SI 2010/1514)
- The A3(M) Motorway and the A27 Trunk Road (A3(M) Junction 5, Northbound) (Temporary Prohibition of Traffic) Order (SI 2010/1515)
- The M5 Motorway (Junctions 21–22) (Temporary Restriction of Traffic) Order (SI 2010/1516)
- The A30 Trunk Road (Treswithian Junction, Camborne, to Scorrier Junction, Near Redruth, Cornwall) (Temporary Prohibition and Restriction of Traffic) Order (SI 2010/1517)
- The M60 Motorway (Junction 5, Anticlockwise Exit Slip Road) (Temporary Prohibition of Traffic) Order (SI 2010/1518)
- The A590 Trunk Road (Tebay Lane to North Lonsdale Terrace, Ulverston) (Temporary Prohibition and Restriction of Traffic) Order (SI 2010/1519)
- The A580 Trunk Road (Haydock Island Circulatory Carriageway) (Prohibition of Right Turns) Order (SI 2010/1520)
- The A50 Trunk Road (West Broughton to Sudbury, Derbyshire) (Temporary Prohibition of Traffic) Order (SI 2010/1521)
- The M5 Motorway (Junction 11A Southbound Exit Slip Road) (Temporary Restriction of Traffic) Order (SI 2010/1522)
- The Air Navigation (Restriction of Flying) (Whitehaven, Cumbria) Regulations 2010 (SI 2010/1523)
- The Air Navigation (Restriction of Flying) (Whitehaven, Cumbria) (Amendment) Regulations 2010 (SI 2010/1524)
- The Air Navigation (Restriction of Flying) (Whitehaven, Cumbria) (Revocation) Regulations 2010 (SI 2010/1525)
- The A50 Trunk Road (Uttoxeter, Staffordshire) (Temporary Prohibition of Traffic) Order (SI 2010/1527)
- The M5 Motorway (Junction 11) (Temporary Prohibition and Restriction of Traffic) Order (SI 2010/1528)
- The M4 Motorway (Junctions 15–17) (Temporary Restriction of Traffic) Order (SI 2010/1529)
- The A38 Trunk Road (Marley Head to Dart Bridge Junction and Haldon Hill, Devon) (Temporary Prohibition and Restriction of Traffic) Order (SI 2010/1530)
- The Dartford-Thurrock Crossing (Amendment) Regulations (SI 2010/1531)
- The Electoral Law (Polling Station Scheme) (Northern Ireland) Regulations (SI 2010/1532)
- The M25 Motorway and the M11 Motorway (Junctions 26 – 27) (Temporary Restriction and Prohibition of Traffic) Order 2010 Variation Order (SI 2010/1534)
- The A64 Trunk Road (Musley Bank Interchange to Pickering Interchange) (Temporary Prohibition of Traffic) Order (SI 2010/1535)
- The Local Justice Areas Order (SI 2010/1536)
- The M1 Motorway (Junction 42, Lofthouse Interchange) (Temporary Prohibition of Traffic) Order (SI 2010/1537)
- The M42 Motorway (Junction 6 — Junction 5) (Temporary Prohibition of Traffic) Order (SI 2010/1539)
- The A50 Trunk Road (Meir Tunnel, Stoke-on-Trent) (Temporary Prohibition of Traffic) Order (SI 2010/1540)
- The M6 Motorway (Junction 9, Walsall) (Slip Roads) (Temporary Prohibition of Traffic) Order (SI 2010/1541)
- The A12 Trunk Road (Breydon Bridge, Great Yarmouth, Norfolk) (Temporary Prohibition of Traffic and Pedestrians) Order (SI 2010/1542)
- The A46 Trunk Road (M40 Junction 15, Warwickshire) (Bus Lane) Order (SI 2010/1543)
- The Health Protection (Part 2A Orders) (Wales) Regulations (SI 2010/1544)
- The Health Protection (Local Authority Powers) (Wales) Regulations (SI 2010/1545)
- The Health Protection (Notification) (Wales) Regulations (SI 2010/1546)
- The Health and Social Care Act 2008 (Commencement 4, Transitional and Savings Provisions) (Wales) Order (SI 2010/1547)
- The A46 Trunk Road (M40 Junction 15, Warwickshire) (40 Miles Per Hour Speed Limit and Derestriction) Order (SI 2010/1548)
- The M6 Motorway (Junction 32, Southbound Carriageway) and the M55 Motorway (Junction 1, Eastbound Carriageway and Link Road to the M6 Southbound) (Temporary Prohibition and Restriction of Traffic) Order (SI 2010/1549)
- The Inspectors of Education, Children's Services and Skills ( 3) Order (SI 2010/1550)
- The Secretary of State for Culture, Olympics, Media and Sport Order (SI 2010/1551)
- The European Communities (Designation) ( 2) Order (SI 2010/1552)
- The Education (Chief Inspector of Education and Training in Wales) ( 2) Order (SI 2010/1553)
- The Pyrotechnic Articles (Safety) Regulations (SI 2010/1554)
- The M6 Motorway (Junctions 39–40, Northbound and Southbound Carriageways) (Temporary Restriction of Traffic) Order (SI 2010/1555)
- The A27 Trunk Road (Lewes Road, Wilmington Green) (Temporary Restriction and Prohibition of Traffic) Order (SI 2010/1557)
- The A404 Trunk Road and the A404(M) Motorway (Bisham Roundabout – M4 Junction 8/9) (Temporary Restriction and Prohibition of Traffic) Order 2009 Variation Order (SI 2010/1558)
- The M25 Motorway (Junctions 27 – 29) (Temporary Restriction and Prohibition of Traffic) Order (SI 2010/1559)
- The M20 Motorway (Junctions 7 – 5, Londonbound) (Temporary Restriction and Prohibition of Traffic) Order (SI 2010/1560)
- The M1 Motorway (Junctions 14 – 15 Northbound, Hartwell, Milton Keynes) (Temporary Restriction and Prohibition of Traffic) Order (SI 2010/1561)
- The A580 Trunk Road (Haydock Island Circulatory Carriageway) (40 Miles Per Hour Speed Limit) Order (SI 2010/1562)
- The M40 Motorway (Junction 3, Buckinghamshire) Slip Roads (Temporary Prohibition of Traffic) Order (SI 2010/1563)
- The A47 Trunk Road (B1108 Watton Road Roundabout, West of Norwich, Norfolk) Westbound Slip Roads (Temporary Prohibition of Traffic) Order (SI 2010/1564)
- The A35 Trunk Road (Axminster Bypass, Devon) (Temporary Prohibition of Traffic) Order (SI 2010/1565)
- The A35 Trunk Road (Long Bredy to Litton Cheney, Dorset) (Temporary Prohibition and Restriction of Traffic) Order (SI 2010/1566)
- The A30 Trunk Road (Bolventor to Launceston Slip Roads, Cornwall) (Temporary Prohibition of Traffic) Order (SI 2010/1567)
- The M62 Motorway (Junctions 20–21, Eastbound and Westbound Carriageways and Slip Roads) (Temporary Prohibition and Restriction of Traffic) Order (SI 2010/1568)
- The M62 Motorway (Junctions 22–21, Westbound Carriageway) (Temporary Prohibition and Restriction of Traffic) Order (SI 2010/1569)
- The A64 Trunk Road (Cock Bridge Interchange to Headley Bar Interchange) (Temporary Prohibition of Traffic) Order (SI 2010/1570)
- The M18 Motorway (Junction 3 to Junction 4) (Temporary Prohibition of Traffic) (2) Order (SI 2010/1571)
- The A1 Trunk Road (The A192 Fair Moor Interchange) (Temporary Prohibition of Traffic) Order (SI 2010/1572)
- The A1(M) Motorway and the A168 Trunk Road (Dishforth Interchange to Topcliffe Interchange) (Temporary Restriction and Prohibition of Traffic) Order (SI 2010/1573)
- The A66 Trunk Road (Little Burdon Roundabout to Longnewton Reservoir) (Temporary Restriction and Prohibition of Traffic) Order (SI 2010/1574)
- The A19 Trunk Road and the A66 Trunk Road (Stockton Road Interchange) (Temporary Prohibition of Traffic) (2) Order (SI 2010/1575)
- The A1 Trunk Road (Cock Hill to Warreners House Interchange) (Temporary Restriction and Prohibition of Traffic) Order (SI 2010/1580)
- The M1 Motorway (Junction 36 to Junction 37) (Temporary Restriction and Prohibition of Traffic) Order (SI 2010/1581)
- The M42 Motorway (Junction 6) (Northbound Exit Slip Road) (Temporary Prohibition of Traffic) Order (SI 2010/1582)
- The Football Spectators (Seating) Order (SI 2010/1584)
- The Rice Products from the United States of America (Restriction on First Placing on the Market) (England) (Revocation) Regulations (SI 2010/1585)
- The M42 Motorway (Junctions 6 – 4) (Temporary Restriction and Prohibition of Traffic) Order (SI 2010/1591)
- The M54 Motorway (Junctions 2 – 4) (Temporary Prohibition of Traffic) Order (SI 2010/1592)
- The Health and Social Care Act 2008 (Consequential Amendments) (Wales) Order (SI 2010/1593)
- The M6 Motorway (Junction 3a to Junction 4) (Temporary Prohibition of Traffic) Order (SI 2010/1594)
- The A30 Trunk Road (Fingle Glen to Alphington Junction, Exeter) (Temporary Prohibition of Traffic) Order (SI 2010/1595)
- The M5 Motorway (Junction 12 Northbound Entry Slip Road) (Temporary Prohibition of Traffic) Order (SI 2010/1598)
- The M65 Motorway (Junctions 1–2 Eastbound Carriageway and Junction 1 Eastbound Entry Slip Road)(Temporary Prohibition of Traffic) Order (SI 2010/1599)
- The Fishing Boats (Electronic Transmission of Fishing Activities Data) (England) Scheme (SI 2010/1600)

== 1601–1700 ==
- The A14(M) Motorway (A1(M) Motorway Junction 14 to the A14 Trunk Road, Alconbury, Cambridgeshire) (Temporary Prohibition of Traffic) Order (SI 2010/1601)
- The M40 Motorway (Junction 6, Oxfordshire) Northbound (Temporary Prohibition of Traffic) Order (SI 2010/1602)
- The A50 Trunk Road (Blythe Bridge Bypass) (Temporary Prohibition of Traffic) Order (SI 2010/1603)
- The A12 Trunk Road (North of Crown Interchange, Colchester, Essex) Southbound Exit Slip Road (Temporary Prohibition of Traffic) Order (SI 2010/1604)
- The A34 Trunk Road (Litchfield Interchange, Northbound Entry Slip Road) (Temporary Prohibition of Traffic) Order (SI 2010/1605)
- The A303 Trunk Road (Monxton Road Bridge) (Temporary Restriction of Traffic) Order (SI 2010/1606)
- The A2070 Trunk Road (Bad Munstereifel Road, Northbound) (Temporary Restriction and Prohibition of Traffic) Order (SI 2010/1607)
- The A40 Trunk Road (Huntley to Lea, Gloucestershire) (Temporary Prohibition of Traffic) Order (SI 2010/1608)
- The A303 Trunk Road (Picket Twenty, Eastbound Carriageway) (Temporary Prohibition of Traffic) Order (SI 2010/1609)
- The A30 Trunk Road (Alphington Junction, Exeter) (Temporary Prohibition of Traffic) Order (SI 2010/1610)
- The M25 Motorway (Junctions 10 – 11) (Temporary Prohibition of Traffic) Order (SI 2010/1611)
- The M6 Motorway (Junction 18, Southbound Exit Slip Road) (Temporary Prohibition of Traffic) Order (SI 2010/1612)
- The M62 Motorway (Junctions 20–21, Eastbound Carriageway and Junction 21 Eastbound Exit Slip Road) (Temporary Prohibition and Restriction of Traffic) Order (SI 2010/1613)
- The General Pharmaceutical Council (Appeals Committee Rules) Order of Council (SI 2010/1614)
- The General Pharmaceutical Council (Fitness to Practise and Disqualification etc. Rules) Order of Council (SI 2010/1615)
- The General Pharmaceutical Council (Statutory Committees and their Advisers Rules) Order of Council (SI 2010/1616)
- The General Pharmaceutical Council (Registration Rules) Order of Council (SI 2010/1617)
- The General Pharmaceutical Council (Transfer of Property, Rights and Liabilities, Fees and Grants) Order of Council (SI 2010/1618)
- The Pharmacy Order 2010 (Registration – Transitional Provisions) Order of Council (SI 2010/1619)
- The Pharmacy Order 2010 (Approved European Pharmacy Qualifications) Order (SI 2010/1620)
- The Pharmacy Order 2010 (Commencement 2) Order of Council (SI 2010/1621)
- The Rice Products from the United States of America (Restriction on First Placing on the Market) (Wales) (Revocation) Regulations (SI 2010/1622)
- The M6 Motorway (Junction 21A, Southbound Carriageway and Link Roads to the M62 Eastbound and Westbound) (Temporary Prohibition and Restriction of Traffic) Order (SI 2010/1625)
- The M6 Motorway (Junction 17 Northbound Entry Slip Road)(Temporary Prohibition of Traffic) Order (SI 2010/1626)
- The Marine Strategy Regulations (SI 2010/1627)
- The M25 Motorway (Junctions 11 – 10, Anti-Clockwise) (Temporary Prohibition of Traffic) Order (SI 2010/1628)
- The A417 Trunk Road (Brockworth Roundabout to Zoons Court Roundabout, Gloucester) and the M5 Motorway (Junction 11A) (Temporary Prohibition of Traffic) Order (SI 2010/1629)
- The A1(M) Motorway (Junction 46 to Junction 48) (Temporary Restriction and Prohibition of Traffic) Order (SI 2010/1630)
- The M1 Motorway (Junction 37, Junction 38 and Junction 40) (Temporary 40 Miles Per Hour Speed Restriction) Order (SI 2010/1631)
- The M49 Motorway (Farm Lane Overbridge to M4 Junction 22) (Temporary Restriction of Traffic) Order (SI 2010/1632)
- The A66 Trunk Road (Brough, Eastbound Carriageway Resurfacing) (Temporary Restriction and Prohibition of Traffic) Order (SI 2010/1633)
- The National Health Service Pension Scheme (Amendment) Regulations (SI 2010/1634)
- The Land Registration (Proper Office) Order (SI 2010/1635)
- The M60 Motorway (Junction 9, Anticlockwise Exit Slip Road)(Temporary Prohibition of Traffic) Order (SI 2010/1636)
- The M60 Motorway (Junction 10, Anticlockwise Entry Slip Road)(Temporary Prohibition of Traffic) ( 2) Order (SI 2010/1637)
- The M61 Motorway (Junctions 3-2 Southbound Carriageway)(Temporary Prohibition of Traffic) Order (SI 2010/1638)
- The A14 Trunk Road (Junction 50 Cedars Interchange, Stowmarket, Suffolk) (Temporary Prohibition of Traffic) Order (SI 2010/1639)
- The Saving Gateway Accounts Act 2009 (Revocation of Commencement) Order (SI 2010/1640)
- The M3 Motorway (Junctions 5 and 7, Slip Roads) (Temporary 40 Miles Per Hour Speed Restriction) Order (SI 2010/1641)
- The Authorised Investment Funds (Tax) (Amendment 2) Regulations (SI 2010/1642)
- The A303 Trunk Road (Micheldever, Eastbound Carriageway) (Temporary Restriction and Prohibition of Traffic) Order (SI 2010/1643)
- The A3 Trunk Road (Greatham, Northbound Carriageway) (Temporary Restriction and Prohibition of Traffic) Order (SI 2010/1644)
- The M3 Motorway (Junction 12, Northbound Entry Slip Road) (Temporary 40 Miles Per Hour Speed Restriction) Order (SI 2010/1645)
- The A11 Trunk Road (Attleborough, Norfolk) Westbound Exit Slip Road (Temporary Prohibition of Traffic) Order (SI 2010/1646)
- The National Health Service (Miscellaneous Amendments Relating to Independent Prescribing) (Wales) Regulations (SI 2010/1647)
- The National Health Service (Pharmaceutical Services) (Amendment) (Wales) ( 2) Regulations (SI 2010/1648)
- The M606 Motorway and the M62 Motorway (Chain Bar Roundabout) (Temporary Prohibition of Traffic) Order (SI 2010/1649)
- The A56 Trunk Road (Bent Gate)(50 Miles Per Hour Speed Limit) Order (SI 2010/1650)
- The Social Security (Disability Living Allowance) (Amendment) Regulations (SI 2010/1651)
- The A259 Trunk Road (Straight Lane, Near Brookland) (Temporary Prohibition of Traffic) Order (SI 2010/1652)
- The A249 Trunk Road (Kingsferry Bridge) (Temporary Prohibition of Traffic) Order (SI 2010/1653)
- The A63 Trunk Road (North Cave Interchange to South Cave Interchange) and the M62 Motorway (Temporary Prohibition of Traffic) Order (SI 2010/1654)
- The Non-Domestic Rating (Small Business Rate Relief) (England) (Amendment) Order (SI 2010/1655)
- The Non-Domestic Rating (Collection and Enforcement) (Local Lists) (England) (Amendment) (2) Regulations (SI 2010/1656)
- The A19 Trunk Road (Sheraton Interchange to Wellfield Interchange) (Temporary Restriction and Prohibition of Traffic) Order (SI 2010/1658)
- The A1 Trunk Road (Redhouse Interchange to Barnsdale Bar Interchange) and the A1(M) Motorway (Temporary Prohibition of Traffic) Order (SI 2010/1659)
- The A1 Trunk Road (Catterick South Interchange) (Temporary Prohibition of Traffic) Order (SI 2010/1660)
- The M271 Motorway (Brownhill Way — Redbridge Roundabout) (Temporary Restriction and Prohibition of Traffic) Order (SI 2010/1661)
- The M4 Motorway (Junctions 14 and 15, Slip Roads) (Temporary 40 Miles Per Hour Speed Restriction) Order (SI 2010/1662)
- The A40 Trunk Road (M40 Junction 1, Eastbound Slip Road) (Temporary Prohibition of Traffic) Order (SI 2010/1663)
- The Safety of Sports Grounds (Designation) (2) Order (SI 2010/1664)
- The A30 Trunk Road (Various Sites, Penzance to Launceston, Cornwall) (Temporary Prohibition and Restriction of Traffic) Order (SI 2010/1665)
- The A303 Trunk Road (Stonehenge Summer Solstice, Wiltshire) (Temporary Prohibition and Restriction of Traffic) Order (SI 2010/1666)
- The A19 Trunk Road (Layby at Backworth) (Temporary Prohibition of Traffic) Order (SI 2010/1667)
- The Zoonoses and Animal By-Products (Fees) (England) Regulations (SI 2010/1668)
- The A428 Trunk Road (Barford Road Roundabout, Eynesbury, St Neots) (Temporary 40 Miles Per Hour Speed Restriction) Order (SI 2010/1669)
- The A43 Trunk Road (Silverstone, Northamptonshire) (Temporary 50 Miles Per Hour Speed Restriction) Order (SI 2010/1670)
- The Eggs and Chicks (Wales) Regulations (SI 2010/1671)
- The M42 Motorway (Junction 4) (Slip Roads) (Temporary Prohibition of Traffic) Order (SI 2010/1672)
- The Medicines for Human Use (Prescribing by EEA Practitioners) (Amendment) Regulations (SI 2010/1673)
- The M5 and M6 Motorways (M6 Junction 8) (Link Roads) (Temporary Restriction and Prohibition of Traffic) Order (SI 2010/1674)
- The Export Control (Burma) (Amendment) Order (SI 2010/1675)
- The Social Security (Claims and Payments) Amendment ( 3) Regulations (SI 2010/1676)
- The Gaming Duty (Amendment) Regulations (SI 2010/1677)
- The M5 Motorway (Junction 9) (Temporary Restriction and Prohibition of Traffic) Order (SI 2010/1678)
- The M6 Motorway (Junction 3) (Temporary Prohibition of Traffic) Order (SI 2010/1679)
- The M6 Motorway (Junction 5 to Junction 6) (Temporary Prohibition of Traffic) Order (SI 2010/1680)
- The M1 and M6 Motorways (M1 Junction 19) (Temporary Restriction and Prohibition of Traffic) Order (SI 2010/1681)
- The M6 Motorway (Junction 18, Northbound Entry Slip Road) (Temporary Prohibition of Traffic) Order (SI 2010/1682)
- The M56 Motorway (Junction 5 Eastbound Exit Slip Road to the Manchester International Airport (MIA) Spur Road) (Temporary Prohibition of Traffic) Order (SI 2010/1683)
- The M6 Motorway (Junction 18, Northbound Exit Slip Road) (Temporary Prohibition of Traffic) Order (SI 2010/1684)
- The M60 Motorway Junction 4 (Clockwise Link Road to the M56 Westbound) (Temporary Prohibition of Traffic) Order (SI 2010/1685)
- The A1 Trunk Road (Layby at Shilbottle) (Temporary Prohibition of Traffic) Order (SI 2010/1686)
- The A56 Trunk Road (Rising Bridge) (50 Miles per Hour Speed Limit and U-Turn Ban) (Temporary Prohibition and Restriction of Traffic) Order (SI 2010/1687)
- The M5 Motorway (Junctions 13–14) (Temporary Restriction of Traffic) Order (SI 2010/1688)
- The Air Navigation (Restriction of Flying) (Jet Formation Display Teams) ( 2) (Amendment 2) Regulations (SI 2010/1689)
- The Integrated Family Support Teams (Composition of Teams and Board Functions) (Wales) Regulations (SI 2010/1690)
- The Air Navigation (Restriction of Flying) (Northampton Sywell) Regulations (SI 2010/1691)
- The M4 Motorway (Rogiet Toll Plaza) (Temporary Restriction of Traffic) Order 2009 Revocation Order (SI 2010/1692)
- The M65 Motorway (Junctions 3–4 Eastbound Carriageway and Junction 3 Eastbound Entry Slip Road) (Temporary Prohibition of Traffic) Order (SI 2010/1693)
- The M57 Motorway (Southbound Link Road to the M62 Eastbound) and the M62 Motorway (Junction 6 Eastbound Entry Slip Road)(Temporary Prohibition of Traffic) Order (SI 2010/1694)
- The M25 Motorway (Junctions 15 – 16) (Temporary Restriction and Prohibition of Traffic) Order (SI 2010/1695)
- The M27 Motorway (Junction 5, Slip Roads) (Temporary Restriction and Prohibition of Traffic) Order (SI 2010/1696)
- The M26 Motorway (Junction 2A, Slip Roads) (Temporary Prohibition of Traffic) Order (SI 2010/1697)
- The A5 Trunk Road (A509 Portway Interchange (H5) to A421 Standing Way/Grafton Street Interchange (H8), Milton Keynes) (Temporary Restriction and Prohibition of Traffic) Order (SI 2010/1698)
- The Children and Families (Wales) Measure 2010 (Commencement) Order (SI 2010/1699)
- The Integrated Family Support Teams (Review of Cases) (Wales) Regulations (SI 2010/1700)

== 1701–1800 ==
- The Integrated Family Support Teams (Family Support Functions) (Wales) Regulations (SI 2010/1701)
- The Apprenticeships, Skills, Children and Learning Act 2009 (Commencement 3 (Amendment)) Order (SI 2010/1702)
- The Child Minding and Day Care (Disqualification) (Wales) Regulations (SI 2010/1703)
- The Cancellation of Student Loans for Living Costs Liability (Wales) Regulations (SI 2010/1704)
- The Mortgage Repossessions (Protection of Tenants etc.) Act 2010 (Commencement) Order (SI 2010/1705)
- The A31 Trunk Road (Stag Gate — Almer Cross Roads) (Temporary 40 Miles Per Hour Speed Restriction) Order (SI 2010/1706)
- The Safeguarding Vulnerable Groups Act 2006 (Appropriate Officer and Schedule 7 Prescribed Persons) (Revocation) Regulations (SI 2010/1707)
- The A120 Trunk Road (West Street to East of Tey Road, Coggeshall Bypass, Essex) (Temporary Restriction and Prohibition of Traffic) Order (SI 2010/1708)
- The Competition Act 1998 (Land Agreements Exclusion Revocation) Order (SI 2010/1709)
- The Safeguarding Vulnerable Groups Act 2006 (Supervisory Authorities and Devolution Alignment) (Amendment) Order (SI 2010/1710)
- The M25 Motorway (Junctions 24 and 23, Anti-clockwise) (Temporary Prohibition of Traffic) Order (SI 2010/1711)
- The A34 Trunk Road (Litchfield, Northbound Lay-By) (Temporary Prohibition of Traffic) Order (SI 2010/1712)
- The M27 Motorway (Junction 10, Eastbound Entry Slip Road) (Temporary Prohibition of Traffic) Order (SI 2010/1713)
- The A2 Trunk Road (Ebbsfleet, Londonbound Entry Slip Road) (Temporary Prohibition of Traffic) Order (SI 2010/1714)
- The A259 Trunk Road (Icklesham – Winchelsea) (Temporary Restriction and Prohibition of Traffic) Order (SI 2010/1715)
- The Air Navigation (Restriction of Flying) (Jet Formation Display Teams) ( 3) Regulations (SI 2010/1716)
- The Air Navigation (Restriction of Flying) (Farnborough Airshow) (Amendment) Regulations (SI 2010/1717)
- The Air Navigation (Restriction of Flying) (Royal Air Force Waddington) ( 2) Regulations (SI 2010/1718)
- The A2 Trunk Road (Dartford Heath, Slip Roads) (Temporary Prohibition of Traffic) Order (SI 2010/1719)
- The A12 and A120 Trunk Roads (Coggeshall to Marks Tey, Essex) (Temporary Restriction and Prohibition of Traffic) Order (SI 2010/1720)
- The Network Rail (Nuneaton North Chord) Order (SI 2010/1721)
- The Midland Metro Order (SI 2010/1722)
- The Armed Forces and Reserve Forces (Compensation Scheme) (Amendment) Order (SI 2010/1723)
- The Safeguarding Vulnerable Groups Act 2006 (Prescribed Period and Appropriate Officer) (Wales) (Revocation) Regulations (SI 2010/1724)
- The Education (Pupil Registration) (England) (Amendment) Regulations (SI 2010/1725)
- The Northern Ireland Assembly Members Act 2010 (Commencement) Order (SI 2010/1726)
- The National Health Service (Charges for Drugs and Appliances) and (Travel Expenses and Remission of Charges) Amendment Regulations (SI 2010/1727)
- The A14 Trunk Road (Woolpit to Tot Hill Interchange, Stowmarket, Suffolk) (Temporary Restriction and Prohibition of Traffic) Order (SI 2010/1728)
- The A64 Trunk Road (Welburn Crossroads to Whitwell on the Hill) (Temporary 50 Miles Per Hour and 10 Miles Per Hour Speed Restriction) Order (SI 2010/1729)
- The M1 Motorway and the M62 Motorway (Lofthouse Interchange) (Temporary Prohibition of Traffic) Order (SI 2010/1730)
- The M1 Motorway (Junction 39 to Junction 40) (Temporary Restriction of Traffic) Order (SI 2010/1731)
- The M1 Motorway (Junction 30 to Junction 32) and the M18 Motorway (Temporary Restriction and Prohibition of Traffic) Order (SI 2010/1732)
- The A1(M) Motorway (Junction 36, Warmsworth) (Temporary Prohibition of Traffic) Order (SI 2010/1733)
- The M6 Motorway (Junction 6) (Slip Roads) (Temporary Prohibition of Traffic) Order (SI 2010/1734)
- The M6 Motorway (Junction 7 to Junction 6) (Temporary Prohibition of Traffic) Order (SI 2010/1735)
- The Equality Act 2010 (Commencement 1) Order (SI 2010/1736)
- The A49 Trunk Road (Woofferton to Overton, Shropshire) (Temporary Restriction and Prohibition of Traffic) Order (SI 2010/1737)
- The M5 and M42 Motorways (M5 Junction 4a to Junction 4) (Temporary Prohibition of Traffic) Order (SI 2010/1738)
- The Offshore Installations (Safety Zones) (2) Order (SI 2010/1739)
- The M42 Motorway (Junction 4 to Junction 3a) (Temporary Prohibition of Traffic) Order (SI 2010/1740)
- The M45 Motorway (Dunchurch, Warwickshire) (Temporary Restriction and Prohibition of Traffic) Order (SI 2010/1741)
- The M53 Motorway (Junctions 10-8 Northbound and Southbound Carriageways and Slip Roads)(Temporary Prohibition of Traffic) Order (SI 2010/1742)
- The M49 Motorway (M5 Junction 18A to M4 Junction 22) (Temporary Prohibition and Restriction of Traffic) Order (SI 2010/1743)
- The A595 Trunk Road (Inkerman Terrace to Hensingham Roundabout, Hensingham) (Temporary Prohibition and Restriction of Traffic) Order (SI 2010/1744)
- The M60 Motorway (Junctions 13–15, Clockwise and Anticlockwise Carriageways and Slip Roads) and the M61 (Southbound Link Road to the M60 Anticlockwise) (Temporary Prohibition and Restriction of Traffic) Order (SI 2010/1745)
- The A56 Trunk Road (Edenfield Bypass)(Conversion of Layby to Emergency Use Only) Order (SI 2010/1746)
- The M3 Motorway (Junction 3, Westbound Exit Slip Road) (Temporary Prohibition of Traffic) Order (SI 2010/1747)
- The M25 Motorway and the A282 Trunk Road (Junctions 30 – 31, Clockwise) (Temporary 50 Miles Per Hour Speed Restriction) ( 2) Order (SI 2010/1748)
- The A47 Trunk Road (Dogsthorpe/Paston Interchange to Thorney Road, Eye, Peterborough) (Temporary Restriction and Prohibition of Traffic) Order (SI 2010/1749)
- The A43 Trunk Road (Brackley to Towcester, Northamptonshire) (Silverstone British Grand Prix) (Temporary Restriction and Prohibition of Traffic) Order (SI 2010/1750)
- The A1(M) Motorway (Junction 44, Bramham Crossroads) (Temporary Restriction of Traffic) Order (SI 2010/1751)
- The A47 Trunk Road (A146 Trowse Interchange, Norwich, Norfolk) Slip Roads (Temporary Restriction and Prohibition of Traffic) Order (SI 2010/1752)
- The A174 Trunk Road (Stokesley Road Interchange to Greystones Roundabout) and the A1053 Trunk Road (Greystones Road) (Temporary Restriction and Prohibition of Traffic and Pedestrians) Order (SI 2010/1753)
- The A19 Trunk Road (Hylton Grange Interchange to Testos Roundabout) (Temporary Restriction and Prohibition of Traffic) Order (SI 2010/1754)
- The A20 Trunk Road (Petham Court Bridge, Lay-By) (Temporary Prohibition of Traffic) Order (SI 2010/1755)
- The M1 Motorway (Junction 6A, Link Roads) (Temporary Prohibition of Traffic) Order (SI 2010/1756)
- The M27 Motorway (Junction 3, Westbound Exit Slip Road) (Temporary Prohibition of Traffic) Order (SI 2010/1757)
- The Products of Animal Origin (Third Country Imports) (England) (Amendment) Regulations (SI 2010/1758)
- The Firearms (Amendment) Regulations (SI 2010/1759)
- The Animals and Animal Products (Import and Export) (England) (Amendment) Regulations (SI 2010/1760)
- The Coleg Llysfasi College Further Education Corporation (Dissolution) Order (SI 2010/1761)
- The A14 Trunk Road (Stowmarket to Beyton, Suffolk) (Temporary Restriction and Prohibition of Traffic) Order (SI 2010/1764)
- The A1 Trunk Road (Gonerby Moor, Lincolnshire) (Temporary Prohibition of Traffic) Order (SI 2010/1765)
- The A45 Trunk Road (Stonebridge) (Temporary Prohibition of Traffic) Order (SI 2010/1766)
- The Air Navigation (Restriction of Flying) (Rothbury Northumbria) Regulations 2010 (SI 2010/1767)
- The Nutrition and Health Claims (England) (Amendment) Regulations (SI 2010/1768)
- The Merchant Shipping (Ship-to-Ship Transfers) (Amendment) Regulations (SI 2010/1769)
- The M6 Motorway (Junction 6, Gravelly Hill) (Slip Roads) (Temporary Prohibition of Traffic) Order (SI 2010/1770)
- The Designation of Schools Having a Religious Character (Independent Schools) (England) ( 2) Order (SI 2010/1771)
- The A14 Trunk Road (Claydon Interchange, Near Ipswich, Suffolk) (Temporary Prohibition of Traffic) Order (SI 2010/1772)
- The A421 Trunk Road (A4280 St Neots Road/Renhold Interchange, Bedford Southern Bypass) Eastbound Entry Slip Road (Temporary Prohibition of Traffic) Order (SI 2010/1773)
- The A14 Trunk Road (Westley Interchange Junction 42 to Barrow Heath, west of Risby Interchange Junction 41, Suffolk) (Temporary Restriction and Prohibition of Traffic) Order (SI 2010/1774)
- The A47 Trunk Road (A1074 Dereham Road/William Frost Way Roundabout, Costessey, Norfolk) Eastbound Slip Roads (Temporary Prohibition of Traffic) Order (SI 2010/1775)
- The A14 Trunk Road (Junction 40 Higham Interchange and Junction 41 Risby Interchange, Suffolk) (Temporary Restriction and Prohibition of Traffic) Order (SI 2010/1776)
- The A3 Trunk Road (Hindhead) (Closure of Gaps in the Central Reservation at Bedford Farm and Greensand Way, Thursley) Order (SI 2010/1777)
- The A3 Trunk Road (Hindhead) (Closure of Gaps in the Central Reservation at Bramshott Chase) Order (SI 2010/1778)
- The Geneva Conventions and United Nations Personnel (Protocols) Act 2009 (Commencement 2) Order (SI 2010/1779)
- The Poultry Compartments (Wales) Order (SI 2010/1780)
- The Poultry Compartments (Fees) (Wales) Order (SI 2010/1781)
- The Conduct of Employment Agencies and Employment Businesses (Amendment) Regulations (SI 2010/1782)
- The Pool Betting Duty (Application of General Betting Duty Provisions) Regulations (SI 2010/1783)
- The M60 Motorway (Junction 3, Anticlockwise Entry Slip Road from A34 Northbound) (Temporary Prohibition of Traffic) Order (SI 2010/1784)
- The M53 Motorway Junction 11 (Northbound Link Road to the M56 Eastbound) (Temporary Prohibition of Traffic) Order (SI 2010/1785)
- The A160/A180 Trunk Roads (Brocklesby Interchange) (Temporary Prohibition of Traffic) Order (SI 2010/1786)
- The M181 Motorway (Midmoor Interchange to Frodingham Grange Roundabout) and the M180 Motorway (Temporary Prohibition of Traffic) Order (SI 2010/1787)
- The M621 Motorway (Gildersome Interchange) (Temporary Restriction and Prohibition of Traffic) Order (SI 2010/1788)
- The M180 Motorway (Junction 1 to Junction 5) (Temporary Restriction of Traffic) Order (SI 2010/1789)
- The M23 Motorway (Junction 9, Londonbound Carriageway) (Temporary Speed Restriction) Order (SI 2010/1790)
- The A303 Trunk Road (Picket Twenty Interchange, Westbound) (Temporary Prohibition of Traffic) Order (SI 2010/1791)
- The A303 Trunk Road (Monxton Road Bridge, Carriageway/Slip Roads) (Temporary Prohibition of Traffic) Order (SI 2010/1792)
- The M4 Motorway (Junction 14, Slip Roads) (Temporary Prohibition of Traffic) Order (SI 2010/1793)
- The Social Security (Exemption from Claiming Retirement Pension) Regulations (SI 2010/1794)
- The Plant Health (Wales) (Amendment) Order (SI 2010/1795)
- The Seed Potatoes (Wales) (Amendment) Regulations (SI 2010/1796)
- The Assembly Learning Grants (European University Institute) (Wales) (Amendment) Regulations (SI 2010/1797)
- The M1 Motorway (Junctions 15 – 14 Southbound, Milton Keynes) (Temporary Restriction and Prohibition of Traffic) Order (SI 2010/1798)
- The Misuse of Drugs (Amendment 2) (England, Wales and Scotland) Regulations (SI 2010/1799)
- The Misuse of Drugs (Designation) (Amendment 2) (England, Wales and Scotland) Order (SI 2010/1800)

== 1801–1900 ==
- The A13 Trunk Road (M25 Junction 30 – Baker Street Interchange) (Temporary Prohibition of Traffic) Order (SI 2010/1801)
- The M18 Motorway (Thurcroft Interchange to Bramley Interchange) (Temporary Restriction of Traffic) Order (SI 2010/1803)
- The A64 Trunk Road (Tadcaster Bar Interchange and Askham Bryan Interchange) (Temporary Prohibition of Traffic) Order (SI 2010/1804)
- The A63 Trunk Road (Mytongate Gyratory to Garrison Road Roundabout) (Temporary Prohibition of Traffic) Order (SI 2010/1805)
- The Ecclesiastical Exemption (Listed Buildings and Conservation Areas) (England) (Amendment) Order (SI 2010/1806)
- The Agricultural Subsidies and Grants Schemes (Appeals) (Wales) (Amendment) Regulations (SI 2010/1807)
- The Seed (Miscellaneous Amendments) (Wales) Regulations (SI 2010/1808)
- The Dwelling Houses (Execution of Possession Orders by Mortgagees) Regulations (SI 2010/1809)
- The Parliamentary Standards Act (Staff Transfer) Order (SI 2010/1810)
- The Social Security (Housing Costs) (Standard Interest Rate) Amendment Regulations (SI 2010/1811)
- The Local Land Charges (Amendment) Rules (SI 2010/1812)
- The Revenue and Customs (Complaints and Misconduct) Regulations (SI 2010/1813)
- The A1 Trunk Road and the A1(M) Motorway (Junction 45 to Junction 46) (Temporary 50 Miles Per Hour Speed Restriction) Order 2007 (Revocation) Order (SI 2010/1814)
- The A556 Trunk Road (RHS Flower Show) (Temporary Prohibition of Right Turns) Order (SI 2010/1815)
- The Air Navigation (Restriction of Flying) (Rothbury, Northumbria) (Amendment) Regulations 2010 (SI 2010/1816)
- The Children, Schools and Families Act 2010 (Commencement 1) Order (SI 2010/1817)
- The Stamp Duty and Stamp Duty Reserve Tax (Investment Exchanges and Clearing Houses) Regulations (SI 2010/1818)
- The Stamp Duty and Stamp Duty Reserve Tax (Investment Exchanges and Clearing Houses) Regulations ( 2) (SI 2010/1819)
- The Environmental Civil Sanctions (Miscellaneous Amendments) (Wales) Regulations (SI 2010/1820)
- The Environmental Civil Sanctions (Wales) Order (SI 2010/1821)
- The Transmissible Spongiform Encephalopathies (Wales) (Amendment) Regulations (SI 2010/1822)
- The Wireless Telegraphy (Licensing Procedures) Regulations (SI 2010/1823)
- The Stamp Duty and Stamp Duty Reserve Tax (Investment Exchanges and Clearing Houses) (Over the Counter) Regulations (SI 2010/1824)
- The Transfer of State Pensions and Benefits (Amendment) Regulations (SI 2010/1825)
- The A35 Trunk Road (Berne Lane, Charmouth, to Tizard's Knap, Morcombelake, Dorset) (Temporary Restriction of Traffic) Order (SI 2010/1826)
- The A1089 Trunk Road (Orsett Heath, Northbound) (Temporary Restriction and Prohibition of Traffic) Order (SI 2010/1827)
- The M25 Motorway (North of Junction 30) (Temporary Restriction of Traffic) Order (SI 2010/1828)
- The A27 Trunk Road (Fontwell) (Temporary Prohibition of Traffic) Order (SI 2010/1829)
- The M6 Motorway (Junction 1 to M1 Junction 19) (Temporary Prohibition of Traffic) Order (SI 2010/1830)
- The A1 Trunk Road (Markham Moor, Nottinghamshire) (Temporary Prohibition of Traffic) Order (SI 2010/1831)
- The Inspectors of Education, Children's Services and Skills ( 4) Order (SI 2010/1832)
- The Misuse of Drugs Act 1971 (Amendment 2) Order (SI 2010/1833)
- The European Communities (Designation) ( 3) Order (SI 2010/1834)
- The Equality Act 2010 (Offshore Work) Order (SI 2010/1835)
- The Secretary of State for Education Order (SI 2010/1836)
- The Lord President of the Council Order (SI 2010/1837)
- The National Assembly for Wales (Legislative Competence) (Housing and Local Government) Order (SI 2010/1838)
- The Transfer of Functions (Equality) Order (SI 2010/1839)
- M54 Motorway (Junction 2) (Slip Roads) (Temporary Prohibition of Traffic) Order (SI 2010/1840)
- The M6 Motorway (Junction 5) (Northbound Exit Slip Road) (Temporary Prohibition of Traffic) Order (SI 2010/1841)
- The M60 Motorway (Junctions 18 – 23 Clockwise and Anticlockwise Carriageways and Slip Roads) and M62 and M66 Motorways (Temporary Prohibition and Restriction of Traffic) Order (SI 2010/1842)
- The M50 Motorway (Junctions 2 to 4) (Temporary Prohibition of Traffic) Order (SI 2010/1843)
- The M53 Motorway Junction 11 (Southbound Link Road to the M56 Eastbound)(Temporary Prohibition of Traffic) Order (SI 2010/1844)
- The A40 Trunk Road (Longhope Road to Church Road, Near Huntley, Gloucestershire) (Temporary Prohibition of Traffic) Order (SI 2010/1845)
- The A38 Trunk Road (Manadon Flyover to Saltram Overbridge, Plymouth) (Temporary Prohibition and Restriction of Traffic) Order (SI 2010/1846)
- The M48 Motorway (Greenditch Street Overbridge to Junction 1) (Temporary Restriction of Traffic) Order (SI 2010/1847)
- The Criminal Defence Service (General) ( 2) (Amendment) Regulations (SI 2010/1848)
- The Nutrition and Health Claims (Wales) (Amendment) Regulations (SI 2010/1849)
- The M62 Motorway (Junction 20, Eastbound Exit Slip Road) (Temporary Prohibition of Traffic) Order (SI 2010/1850)
- The A19 Trunk Road (Crathorne Interchange to Parkway Interchange) (Temporary Restriction and Prohibition of Traffic) Order (SI 2010/1851)
- The M62 Motorway (Junction 11 Eastbound Exit Slip Road) (Temporary Prohibition of Traffic) Order (SI 2010/1852)
- The A494 Trunk Road (Deeside Park) and the A550 (Southbound Entry Slip Road to the A494 Southbound) (Temporary Prohibition and Restriction of Traffic) Order (SI 2010/1853)
- The Air Navigation (Restriction of Flying) (Rothbury, Northumbria) (Revocation) Regulations 2010 (SI 2010/1854)
- The M58 Motorway (Junction 5 Eastbound Entry and Exit Slip Roads)(Temporary Prohibition of Traffic) Order (SI 2010/1855)
- The M6 Motorway (Junctions 33–34, Southbound Carriageway and Junction 33 Southbound Exit and Entry Slip Roads) (Temporary Prohibition and Restriction of Traffic) Order (SI 2010/1856)
- The A27 Trunk Road (Crockerhill, Eastbound Carriageway) (Temporary Speed Restriction) Order (SI 2010/1857)
- The Coroners and Justice Act 2009 (Commencement 5) Order (SI 2010/1858)
- The A20 Trunk Road (Swanley Interchange, Eastbound Exit Slip Road) (Temporary Prohibition of Traffic) Order (SI 2010/1859)
- The M25 Motorway (Junction 14 and Terminal 5 Spur Roads) (Temporary Prohibition of Traffic) Order (SI 2010/1860)
- The M11 Motorway (Junction 8 Birchanger Roundabout, Essex to Junction 10, Cambridgeshire) (Temporary Restriction and Prohibition of Traffic) Order (SI 2010/1861)
- The A14 Trunk Road (West of Junction 21 Brampton Hut Interchange, Cambridgeshire) Westbound Exit Slip Road (Temporary Prohibition of Traffic) Order (SI 2010/1862)
- The Health Act 2009 (Commencement 4) Order (SI 2010/1863)
- The Safety of Sports Grounds (Designation) (3) Order (SI 2010/1864)
- The A14 Trunk Road (East of St Saviours Interchange Junction 43 to Westley Interchange Junction 42, Bury St Edmunds, Suffolk) (Temporary Restriction and Prohibition of Traffic) Order (SI 2010/1865)
- The M11 Motorway (Junctions 7 – 8, Harlow, Essex) (Temporary Restriction and Prohibition of Traffic) ( 2) Order (SI 2010/1866)
- The M1 Motorway (Junction 35A to Junction 36) (Temporary Restriction of Traffic) Order (SI 2010/1867)
- The A1(M) Motorway (Junction 43 to Junction 42 and Junction 44) (Temporary Prohibition of Traffic) Order (SI 2010/1868)
- The A1 Trunk Road (Longhorsley Junction and Causey Park Hag Junction) (Temporary Prohibition of Traffic) Order (SI 2010/1869)
- The A1 Trunk Road (Dunston Interchange to Scotswood Interchange) (Temporary Restriction and Prohibition of Traffic) Order (SI 2010/1870)
- The M1 Motorway (Junction 44, Junction 45, Junction 46 and Junction 47) (Temporary Prohibition of Traffic) Order (SI 2010/1871)
- The M621 Motorway (Junction 2A, Junction 3 and Junction 4) (Temporary Prohibition of Traffic) Order (SI 2010/1872)
- The M4 Motorway (Junction 10, Eastbound Link Road) (Temporary Prohibition of Traffic) Order (SI 2010/1873)
- The School Information (England) (Amendment) (Revocation) Regulations (SI 2010/1874)
- The M20 Motorway (Junction 2, Westbound Entry Slip Road) (Temporary Prohibition of Traffic) Order (SI 2010/1875)
- The Gorseinion College Further Education Corporation and Swansea College Further Education Corporation (Dissolution) Order (SI 2010/1876)
- The Stamp Duty and Stamp Duty Reserve Tax (Investment Exchanges and Clearing Houses) Regulations ( 3) (SI 2010/1877)
- The Finance Act 2009, Sections 101 to 103 (Appointed Day and Supplemental Provision) Order (SI 2010/1878)
- The Taxes and Duties (Interest Rate) Regulations (SI 2010/1879)
- The International Monetary Fund (Limit on Lending) Order (SI 2010/1880)
- The Health and Social Care Act 2008 (Miscellaneous Consequential Amendments) Order (SI 2010/1881)
- The Medicines for Human Use (Advanced Therapy Medicinal Products and Miscellaneous Amendments) Regulations (SI 2010/1882)
- The Audiovisual Media Services (Codification) Regulations (SI 2010/1883)
- The Swansea Bay Port Health Authority (Amendment) Order (SI 2010/1884)
- The Milford Port Health Authority (Amendment) Order (SI 2010/1885)
- The Addition of Vitamins, Minerals and Other Substances (England) (Amendment) Regulations (SI 2010/1886)
- The Sutton Harbour Revision Order (SI 2010/1887)
- The Energy Act 2008 (Commencement 5) Order (SI 2010/1888)
- The Energy Act 2004 (Commencement 10) Order (SI 2010/1889)
- The Zoonoses and Animal By-Products (Fees) (Wales) (Amendment) Regulations (SI 2010/1890)
- The Apprenticeships, Skills, Children and Learning Act 2009 (Commencement 2 (Amendment) and Transitional Provision) Order (SI 2010/1891)
- The Common Agricultural Policy Single Payment and Support Schemes (Wales) Regulations (SI 2010/1892)
- The Home Energy Efficiency Scheme (England) (Amendment) Regulations (SI 2010/1893)
- The Child Trust Funds (Amendment 3) Regulations (SI 2010/1894)
- The A419 Trunk Road (Castle Eaton, Kingshill and Lower Widhill Farm Junctions, Near Cricklade, Wiltshire) (Temporary Prohibition of Traffic) Order (SI 2010/1895)
- The M57 Motorway (Junction 1 Northbound Entry Slip Road) (Temporary Prohibition of Traffic) Order (SI 2010/1896)
- The Stamp Duty and Stamp Duty Reserve Tax (Investment Exchanges and Clearing Houses) Regulations ( 4) (SI 2010/1897)
- The Parental Responsibility and Measures for the Protection of Children (International Obligations) (England and Wales and Northern Ireland) Regulations (SI 2010/1898)
- The Qualifying Oil Fields Order (SI 2010/1899)
- The Ryde Pier Harbour Revision Order 2010 (SI 2010/1900)

== 1901–2000 ==
- The National Minimum Wage Regulations 1999 (Amendment) Regulations (SI 2010/1901)
- The Organic Products (Amendment) Regulations (SI 2010/1902)
- The Electricity (Competitive Tenders for Offshore Transmission Licences) Regulations (SI 2010/1903)
- The Taxes (Definition of Charity) (Relevant Territories) Regulations (SI 2010/1904)
- The Welfare Reform Act 2007 (Commencement 12) Order (SI 2010/1905)
- The Employment and Support Allowance (Transitional Provisions, Housing Benefit and Council Tax Benefit) (Existing Awards) (Revocation) Regulations (SI 2010/1906)
- The Employment and Support Allowance (Transitional Provisions, Housing Benefit and Council Tax Benefit) (Existing Awards) ( 2) Regulations (SI 2010/1907)
- The Sale of Electricity by Local Authorities (Scotland) Regulations (SI 2010/1908)
- The Terrorism Act 2006 (Disapplication of Section 25) Order (SI 2010/1909)
- The Sale of Electricity by Local Authorities (England and Wales) Regulations (SI 2010/1910)
- The Henley College Sixth Form College Corporation Designation (England) Order (SI 2010/1911)
- The Legal Officers (Annual Fees) Order (SI 2010/1912)
- The Ecclesiastical Judges, Legal Officers and Others (Fees) Order (SI 2010/1913)
- The Alcoholic Liquor Duties (Definition of Cider) Order (SI 2010/1914)
- The Equality Act 2010 (Designation of Institutions with a Religious Ethos) (England and Wales) Order (SI 2010/1915)
- The Family Proceedings Fees (Amendment) Order (SI 2010/1916)
- The Magistrates’ Courts Fees (Amendment 2) Order (SI 2010/1917)
- The School Governance (Transition from an Interim Executive Board) (England) Regulations (SI 2010/1918)
- The Education (Pupil Referral Units) (Application of Enactments) (England) (Amendment) ( 2) Regulations (SI 2010/1919)
- The Education (Short Stay Schools) (Closure) (England) (Amendment) Regulations (SI 2010/1920)
- The Criminal Procedure (Amendment) Rules (SI 2010/1921)
- The Church of England Pensions (Amendment) Regulations (SI 2010/1922)
- The Ecclesiastical Offices (Terms of Service) Directions (SI 2010/1923)
- The Parochial Fees Order (SI 2010/1924)
- The State Pension Credit Pilot Scheme Regulations (SI 2010/1925)
- The A465 Trunk Road (Llanfoist Junction, Llanfoist, Monmouthshire) (30 & 40 mph Speed Limit) Order 2010 (SI 2010/1926)
- The Cosmetic Products (Safety) (Amendment 2) Regulations (SI 2010/1927)
- The Toys (Safety) (Amendment) Regulations (SI 2010/1928)
- The Pensions Regulator (Contribution Notices) (Sum Specified following Transfer) Regulations (SI 2010/1929)
- The Occupational Pension Schemes (Levies) (Amendment) Regulations (SI 2010/1930)
- The Constitutional Reform and Governance Act 2010 (Commencement 2 and Transitional Provisions) Order (SI 2010/1931)
- The A5036 Trunk Road (Junctions with the A5090 and the A5038, Litherland)(Temporary Prohibition of Traffic) Order (SI 2010/1932)
- The A40 Trunk Road (Churcham, Gloucestershire) (Temporary Prohibition and Restriction of Traffic) (Number 2) Order (SI 2010/1933)
- The M42 Motorway (Southbound Carriageway between Junctions 10 – 9) (Temporary Restriction and Prohibition of Traffic) Order (SI 2010/1934)
- The M5 Motorway (Northbound Carriageway between Junctions 5 and 4a) (Temporary Restriction and Prohibition of Traffic) Order (SI 2010/1935)
- The A43 Trunk Road (Cottisford) (Temporary Prohibition of Traffic) Order (SI 2010/1936)
- The Academies Act 2010 (Commencement and Transitional Provisions) Order (SI 2010/1937)
- The Academy Conversions (Transfer of School Surpluses) Regulations (SI 2010/1938)
- The Education and Inspections Act 2006 and Education and Skills Act 2008 (Consequential Amendments to Subordinate Legislation) (England) Regulations (SI 2010/1939)
- The Education (Individual Pupil Information) (Prescribed Persons) (England) (Amendment) Regulations (SI 2010/1940)
- The Apprenticeships, Skills, Children and Learning Act 2009 (Consequential Amendments to Subordinate Legislation) (England) Order (SI 2010/1941)
- The Charities Act 2006 (Commencement 5, Transitional and Transitory Provisions and Savings) (Amendment) Order (SI 2010/1942)
- The M53 Motorway (Junction 2a Moreton Spur Eastbound Carriageway) (Temporary Prohibition of Traffic) Order (SI 2010/1943)
- The M65 Motorway (Junctions 7–8 Eastbound Carriageway and Junction 7 Eastbound Entry Slip Road)(Temporary Prohibition of Traffic) Order (SI 2010/1944)
- The M62 Motorway (Junction 20, Eastbound Entry Slip Road) (Temporary Prohibition of Traffic) Order (SI 2010/1945)
- The M6 Motorway (Junctions 33–34, Northbound Carriageway and Junction 34 Northbound Exit and Entry Slip Roads) (Temporary Prohibition and Restriction of Traffic) ( 2) Order (SI 2010/1946)
- The A52 Trunk Road (M1 Junction 25, Derbyshire) (Temporary Prohibition of Traffic) Order (SI 2010/1947)
- The A46 Trunk Road (Syston to Dalby Wolds, Leicestershire) (Temporary Restriction and Prohibition of Traffic) ( 2) Order (SI 2010/1948)
- The M6 Motorway (Junctions 16–17 Northbound and Southbound Carriageways and Junction 17 Slip Roads) (Temporary Prohibition and Restriction of Traffic) Order (SI 2010/1949)
- The A494 Trunk Road (Eastbound and Westbound Exit Slip Roads to the A540) (Temporary Prohibition of Traffic) Order (SI 2010/1950)
- The M62 Motorway (Junction 19, Westbound Exit and Entry Slip Roads) (Temporary Prohibition of Traffic) Order (SI 2010/1951)
- The M65 Motorway (Junctions 8-7 Westbound Carriageway and Junction 8 Westbound Entry Slip Road) (Temporary Prohibition of Traffic) Order (SI 2010/1952)
- The Civil Procedure (Amendment 2) Rules (SI 2010/1953)
- The Education (Pupil Registration) (Wales) Regulations (SI 2010/1954)
- The Serious Organised Crime and Police Act 2005 (Disclosure of Information by SOCA) Order (SI 2010/1955)
- The M65 Motorway (Junctions 8–10 Eastbound Carriageway and Junction 8 Eastbound Entry Slip Road) (Temporary Prohibition of Traffic) Order (SI 2010/1956)
- The A5103 Trunk Road (Temporary Prohibition and Restriction of Traffic) Order (SI 2010/1957)
- The Electricity and Gas (Carbon Emissions Reduction) (Amendment) Order (SI 2010/1958)
- The A11 and A14 Trunk Roads (Nine Mile Hill to Six Mile Bottom, Cambridgeshire) (Temporary Prohibition of Traffic) Order (SI 2010/1959)
- The A1(M) Motorway (Junction 7 Knebworth, Hertfordshire) Slip Roads (Temporary Prohibition of Traffic) Order (SI 2010/1960)
- The M62 Motorway (Junction 34, Whitley) (Temporary Prohibition of Traffic) Order (SI 2010/1961)
- The Air Navigation (Restriction of Flying) (Newport Ryder Cup) Regulations (SI 2010/1962)
- The Air Navigation (Restriction of Flying) (Southport) Regulations (SI 2010/1963)
- The Air Navigation (Restriction of Flying) (Royal Air Force Leuchars) Regulations (SI 2010/1964)
- The Air Navigation (Restriction of Flying) (Shoreham-by-Sea) Regulations (SI 2010/1965)
- The Equality Act 2010 (Commencement 2) Order (SI 2010/1966)
- The Air Navigation (Restriction of Flying) (Conservative Party Conference Birmingham) Regulations (SI 2010/1967)
- The Air Navigation (Restriction of Flying) (Portrush) Regulations (SI 2010/1968)
- The Consumer Credit (Amendment) Regulations (SI 2010/1969)
- The Consumer Credit (Advertisements) Regulations (SI 2010/1970)
- The M62 Motorway (Junction 25, Brighouse) (Temporary Prohibition of Traffic) Order (SI 2010/1971)
- The A1 Trunk Road (Lobley Hill Interchange to Kingsway Interchange) (Temporary Restriction and Prohibition of Traffic) Order (SI 2010/1972)
- The A12 Trunk Road (Capel St. Mary Junction 32a to Copdock Interchange Junction 33, Ipswich, Suffolk) (Temporary Restriction and Prohibition of Traffic) Order (SI 2010/1973)
- The A1(M) Motorway and the A64 Trunk Road (Bramham Crossroads) (Temporary Prohibition of Traffic) (2) Order (SI 2010/1974)
- The A19 Trunk Road (Wolviston Interchange to Wellfield Interchange) (Temporary Prohibition of Traffic) Order (SI 2010/1975)
- The Coastal Access Reports (Consideration and Modification Procedure) (England) Regulations (SI 2010/1976)
- The A5 Trunk Road (A421 Standing Way/Grafton Street Interchange (H8/V6) to Bletcham Way Interchange (H10), Milton Keynes) (Temporary Prohibition of Traffic) Order (SI 2010/1977)
- The School Teachers’ Pay and Conditions Order (SI 2010/1979)
- The A282 and A2 Trunk Roads and the M25 Motorway (Junctions 1A – 2) (Temporary Prohibition of Traffic) Order (SI 2010/1980)
- The A38 Trunk Road (Island Shop Junction, Liskeard, to Trerulefoot Roundabout, Cornwall) (Temporary Prohibition of Traffic) Order (SI 2010/1981)
- The A3 Trunk Road (Longmoor Interchange — Ham Barn Roundabout, Southbound) (Temporary Restriction of Traffic) Order (SI 2010/1982)
- The M25 Motorway and the A282 Trunk Road (Junctions 30 – 31) (Temporary Restriction and Prohibition of Traffic) Order (SI 2010/1983)
- The M25 Motorway (Junctions 17 – 25) (Temporary Prohibition of Traffic) Order (SI 2010/1984)
- The M1 Motorway (Junction 19) (Temporary Prohibition of Traffic) Order (SI 2010/1985)
- The Policing and Crime Act 2009 (Commencement 6 and Commencement 5 (Amendment)) Order (SI 2010/1986)
- The A1 Trunk Road (Ranby to Apleyhead, Nottinghamshire) (Temporary Prohibition of Traffic) Order (SI 2010/1987)
- The Vaccine Damage Payments (Specified Disease) (Revocation and Savings) Order (SI 2010/1988)
- The M1 Motorway (Junction 23a) (Temporary Restriction and Prohibition of Traffic) Order (SI 2010/1989)
- The M6 Motorway (Junction 6, Gravelly Hill) (Slip Roads) (Temporary Prohibition of Traffic) ( 2) Order (SI 2010/1990)
- The A449 Trunk Road (M54 Junction 2 to Coven) (Temporary Restriction and Prohibition of Traffic) Order (SI 2010/1991)
- The A36 Trunk Road (Standerwick, Somerset) (40 and 50 mph Speed Limit) Order (SI 2010/1992)
- The A5 Trunk Road (Near Newton, Rugby, Warwickshire) (Prohibition and Restriction of Traffic Movements) Order (SI 2010/1993)
- The M60 Motorway (Junctions 1–25 Anticlockwise Carriageway and Junction 1 Anticlockwise Entry Slip Road) (Temporary Prohibition of Traffic) Order (SI 2010/1994)
- The M62 Motorway (Junctions 19–20, Eastbound Carriageway and Junction 19 Eastbound Entry Slip Road) (Temporary Prohibition and Restriction of Traffic) Order (SI 2010/1995)
- The Aviation Greenhouse Gas Emissions Trading Scheme Regulations (SI 2010/1996)
- The Education (Independent School Standards) (England) Regulations (SI 2010/1997)
- The M62 Motorway Junction 12 (Eastbound Link Roads to the M60), M602 (Westbound Link Road to the M60 Anticlockwise) and the M60 Junction 11 Anticlockwise Exit Slip Road (Temporary Prohibition of Traffic) Order (SI 2010/1998)
- The M602 Motorway (Junction 1 Eastbound Carriageway) and the M60 Junction 12 (Clockwise Link Road to the M62 Westbound and the M602 Eastbound) (Temporary Prohibition of Traffic) Order (SI 2010/1999)
- The M62 Motorway (Junctions 11–12, Eastbound and Westbound Carriageways) (Temporary Prohibition and Restriction of Traffic) Order (SI 2010/2000)

== 2001–2100 ==
- The Plant Health (Fees) (Forestry) (Amendment) Regulations (SI 2010/2001)
- The Planning and Compulsory Purchase Act 2004 (Commencement 4 and Consequential, Transitional and Savings Provisions) (Wales) (Amendment 1) Order (SI 2010/2002)
- The M62 Motorway (Junction 11 Eastbound Entry Slip Road) (Temporary Prohibition of Traffic) Order (SI 2010/2003)
- The A27 Trunk Road (Falmer Interchange, Westbound Entry Slip Road) (Temporary Prohibition of Traffic) Order (SI 2010/2004)
- The M1 Motorway (Junctions 5 – 6a, Link/Slip Roads) (Temporary Prohibition of Traffic) Order (SI 2010/2005)
- The A30 Trunk Road (Blackwater Layby, Near Scorrier, Cornwall) (Temporary Prohibition of Traffic) Order (SI 2010/2006)
- The Export Control (Amendment) ( 2) Order (SI 2010/2007)
- The M25 Motorway (Holmesdale Tunnel) (Temporary Restriction and Prohibition of Traffic) Order (SI 2010/2008)
- The A40 Trunk Road (Denham Roundabout) (Temporary Prohibition of Traffic) Order (SI 2010/2009)
- The M20 Motorway (Junction 9, Slip Roads) (Temporary Prohibition of Traffic) Order (SI 2010/2010)
- The M1 Motorway (Junction 14, Milton Keynes) Slip Roads (Temporary Prohibition of Traffic) Order (SI 2010/2011)
- The A3 Trunk Road (Hazel Grove – Crossways Road) Temporary Prohibition of Traffic) Order (SI 2010/2012)
- The M20 Motorway (Junctions 5 – 7, Coastbound) (Temporary Restriction and Prohibition of Traffic) Order (SI 2010/2013)
- The M4 Motorway (Junctions 3 – 5, Link and Slip Roads) (Temporary Prohibition of Traffic) Order (SI 2010/2014)
- The M20 Motorway (Junction 2, Slip Roads) (Temporary Prohibition of Traffic) Order (SI 2010/2015)
- The A66 Trunk Road (Ramsay Brow, Workington Resurfacing) (Temporary Restriction and Prohibition of Traffic) Order (SI 2010/2016)
- The A66 Trunk Road (Troutbeck Junction Resurfacing) (Temporary Prohibition and Restriction of Traffic) Order (SI 2010/2017)
- The M65 Motorway (Junctions 6-5 Westbound Carriageway and Junction 6 Westbound Entry Slip Road) (Temporary Prohibition of Traffic) Order (SI 2010/2018)
- The Sites of Special Scientific Interest (Appeals) (Amendment) Regulations (SI 2010/2019)
- The Port of Bristol (Deep Sea Container Terminal) Harbour Revision Order (SI 2010/2020)
- The Local Land Charges (Amendment) (Wales) Rules (SI 2010/2021)
- The A494 Trunk Road (Northbound Exit Slip Road to the A550) (Temporary Prohibition of Traffic) Order (SI 2010/2022)
- The M18 Motorway and the M180 Motorway (North Ings Roundabout) (Temporary Prohibition of Traffic) Order (SI 2010/2023)
- The A1 Trunk Road (Mitford to Hebron Junction) (Temporary Restriction and Prohibition of Traffic) Order (SI 2010/2024)
- The M62 Motorway (Junction 28 and Junction 29) (Temporary Prohibition of Traffic) Order (SI 2010/2025)
- The A36 Trunk Road (Warminster to Fisherton De La Mere, Wiltshire) (Temporary Prohibition of Traffic) Order (SI 2010/2026)
- The A303 Trunk Road (Ilchester Mead Junction, Somerset) (Temporary Prohibition of Traffic) Order (SI 2010/2027)
- The M56 Motorway (Junctions 9–11, Westbound and Eastbound Carriageways and Junction 10 Westbound Entry Slip Road) (Temporary Prohibition and Restriction of Traffic) Order (SI 2010/2028)
- The A5 Trunk Road (Shotatton to Rhoswiel, Shropshire) (Temporary Restriction and Prohibition of Traffic) Order (SI 2010/2029)
- The A49 Trunk Road (Dorrington, Shropshire) (Temporary 10 Miles Per Hour Speed Restriction) Order (SI 2010/2030)
- The M6 Motorway (Junctions 15 to 14) (Temporary Restriction and Prohibition of Traffic) Order (SI 2010/2031)
- The A5 Trunk Road (Edgebold Roundabout to Churncote Roundabout, Shrewsbury, Shropshire) (Temporary Prohibition of Traffic) Order (SI 2010/2032)
- The A52 Trunk Road (Radcliffe on Trent, Nottinghamshire) (Temporary Prohibition of Traffic) Order (SI 2010/2033)
- The M6 Motorway (Junctions 36–37, Northbound Carriageway) (Temporary Restriction of Traffic) Order (SI 2010/2034)
- The M6 Motorway (Junctions 36–37 Northbound Entry and Exit Slip Roads) (Temporary Prohibition of Traffic) Order (SI 2010/2035)
- The A3(M) Motorway and the A27 Trunk Road (Bedhampton/Broad Marsh Interchange) (Temporary Restriction and Prohibition of Traffic) ( 2) Order (SI 2010/2036)
- The A31 Trunk Road (Cadnam Interchange, Westbound) (Temporary Speed Restrictions) Order (SI 2010/2037)
- The M4 Motorway (Junction 5, Westbound) (Temporary Restriction and Prohibition of Traffic) Order (SI 2010/2038)
- The A31 Trunk Road (Palmersford Roundabout – Azalea Roundabout, Eastbound Carriageway) (Temporary 30 Miles Per Hour Speed Restriction) Order (SI 2010/2039)
- The M11 Motorway (Junctions 4 – 6) (Temporary Prohibition of Traffic) Order (SI 2010/2040)
- The A38 Trunk Road (Glynn Valley, Near Bodmin) (Temporary Prohibition of Traffic) Order (SI 2010/2041)
- The M65 Motorway (Junctions 3–2, Westbound Carriageway and Slip Roads) (Temporary Prohibition and Restriction of Traffic) Order (SI 2010/2042)
- The A1 Trunk Road (Lobley Hill Interchange to Dunston Interchange) (Temporary 10 Miles Per Hour and 40 Miles Per Hour Speed Restriction) Order (SI 2010/2043)
- The M18 Motorway (Junction 5) (Temporary Prohibition of Traffic) Order (SI 2010/2044)
- The A1(M) Motorway (Junction 60 to Junction 61) (Temporary Restriction and Prohibition of Traffic) Order (SI 2010/2045)
- The A27 Trunk Road (Hilsea, Eastbound Entry Slip Road) (Temporary Prohibition of Traffic) Order (SI 2010/2046)
- The A303 Trunk Road (Andover Road Interchange, Westbound Entry Slip Road) (Temporary Prohibition of Traffic) Order (SI 2010/2047)
- The M56 Motorway (Junctions 1–3 Westbound Carriageway) (Sharston Link) and Entry Slip Road (Temporary Prohibition of Traffic) Order (SI 2010/2048)
- The M53 Motorway (Junction 9 Northbound Exit Slip Road) (Temporary Prohibition of Traffic) Order (SI 2010/2049)
- The M6 Motorway (Junctions 33 and 35 Northbound Entry and Exit Slip Roads) (Temporary Prohibition of Traffic) Order (SI 2010/2050)
- The M62 Motorway (Junctions 6–8, Eastbound and Westbound Carriageways and Slip Roads) (Temporary Prohibition and Restriction of Traffic) Order (SI 2010/2051)
- The M66 Motorway (Junction 2 to the A56, Northbound and Southbound Carriageways and Slip Road) (Temporary Prohibition of Traffic) Order (SI 2010/2052)
- The A40 Trunk Road (Over Roundabout to Highnam Roundabout, Gloucestershire) (Bus Lane, Prohibition of Use of Gaps in Central Reservation and Prohibition of Turns) Order (SI 2010/2053)
- The A20 Trunk Road (Limekiln Roundabout – Lord Warden Square) (Temporary Prohibition of Traffic) Order (SI 2010/2054)
- The M4 Motorway (Junctions 7 – 6) (Temporary Restriction and Prohibition of Traffic) Order (SI 2010/2055)
- The Veterinary Surgery (Rectal Ultrasound Scanning of Bovines) Order (SI 2010/2056)
- The Veterinary Surgery (Epidural Anaesthesia of Bovines) Order (SI 2010/2058)
- The Veterinary Surgery (Artificial Insemination) Order (SI 2010/2059)
- The Road Vehicles (Construction and Use) (Amendment) ( 3) Regulations (SI 2010/2060)
- The Control of Donations and Regulation of Loans etc. (Extension of the Prescribed Period) (Northern Ireland) Order (SI 2010/2061)
- The A21 Trunk Road (Quarry Hill Interchange – Pembury Road Interchange, Southbound) (Temporary Prohibition of Traffic) Order (SI 2010/2062)
- The A27 Trunk Road (Old Shoreham Road and Shoreham Bypass) (Temporary Restriction and Prohibition of Traffic) Order (SI 2010/2063)
- The M25 Motorway (Junctions 9 – 10) (Temporary Restriction and Prohibition of Traffic) Order (SI 2010/2064)
- The M6 Motorway (Junction 19 Southbound Entry and Exit Slip Roads) (Temporary Prohibition of Traffic) Order (SI 2010/2065)
- The A3 Trunk Road (Esher Common, Slip Roads) (Temporary Prohibition of Traffic) Order (SI 2010/2066)
- The M53 Motorway (Junction 7 Southbound Entry Slip Road) (Temporary Prohibition of Traffic) Order (SI 2010/2067)
- The Seal Products Regulations (SI 2010/2068)
- The Addition of Vitamins, Minerals and Other Substances (Wales) (Amendment) Regulations (SI 2010/2069)
- The A282 Trunk Road (Junctions 1A – 2) (Temporary Prohibition of Traffic) Order (SI 2010/2070)
- The M1 Motorway (Junctions 5 – 4) (Temporary Restriction of Traffic) Order (SI 2010/2071)
- The M26 Motorway (Junctions 2A – 1) (Temporary Restriction and Prohibition of Traffic) Order (SI 2010/2072)
- The A66 Trunk Road (Thorpe Grange) (Temporary 10 Miles Per Hour and 40 Miles Per Hour Speed Restriction) Order (SI 2010/2073)
- The M1 Motorway (Junction 35A, Stocksbridge) (Temporary Prohibition of Traffic) Order (SI 2010/2074)
- The A36 Trunk Road (Petersfinger to Whaddon, near Salisbury) (Temporary Prohibition of Traffic) Order (SI 2010/2075)
- The A30 Trunk Road (Treswithian Junction, Camborne, to Loggans Moor Roundabout, Hayle) (Temporary Prohibition of Traffic) Order (SI 2010/2076)
- The M4 Motorway (Junction 19 Eastbound Entry Slip Road) (Temporary Prohibition of Traffic) (Number 2) Order (SI 2010/2077)
- The Rural Development (Enforcement) (England) (Amendment) Regulations (SI 2010/2078)
- The Marketing of Fruit Plant Material Regulations (SI 2010/2079)
- The A36 Trunk Road (Wylye Junction to Wilton Roundabout, Wiltshire) (Temporary Prohibition of Traffic) Order (SI 2010/2080)
- The A49 Trunk Road (Church Stretton to Bayston Hill, Shropshire) (Temporary Restriction and Prohibition of Traffic) Order (SI 2010/2081)
- The A46 Trunk Road (Near Ansty, Warwickshire) (Temporary Restriction and Prohibition of Traffic) Order (SI 2010/2082)
- The A49 Trunk Road (Ludlow, Shropshire) (Temporary Prohibition of Traffic) Order (SI 2010/2083)
- The M42 Motorway (Junction 9) (Slip Roads) (Temporary Prohibition of Traffic) Order (SI 2010/2084)
- The A49 Trunk Road (Overton to Woofferton, Shropshire) (Temporary Prohibition of Traffic) Order (SI 2010/2085)
- The A5 Trunk Road (Montford Bridge to Edgebold Roundabout, Shropshire) (Temporary Prohibition of Traffic) Order (SI 2010/2086)
- The A1 Trunk Road (Newark-on-Trent to Long Bennington) (Temporary Prohibition of Traffic) Order (SI 2010/2087)
- The Electricity (Connection Standards of Performance) Regulations (SI 2010/2088)
- The Legal Services Act 2007 (Commencement 8, Transitory and Transitional Provisions) Order (SI 2010/2089)
- The Local Government Pension Scheme (Miscellaneous) Regulations (SI 2010/2090)
- The Legal Services Act 2007 (Legal Complaints) (Parties) Order (SI 2010/2091)
- The A46 Trunk Road (Beckford to Sedgeberrow, Worcestershire) (Temporary 10 Miles Per Hour and 40 Miles Per Hour Speed Restriction) ( 2) Order (SI 2010/2092)
- The M6 Motorway (Junctions 3 – 3a) (Temporary Restriction and Prohibition of Traffic) Order (SI 2010/2093)
- The A50 Trunk Road (Blythe Bridge to Uttoxeter, Staffordshire) (Temporary Prohibition of Traffic) Order (SI 2010/2094)
- The M50 Motorway (Junctions 2 to 4) (Temporary Prohibition of Traffic) ( 2) Order (SI 2010/2095)
- The M6 Motorway (Junction 12), The M54 Motorway (Junctions 2 – 3), The A5 Trunk Road and The A449 Trunk Road (Temporary Prohibition of Traffic) Order (SI 2010/2096)
- The A64 Trunk Road (Pickering Interchange to Rillington Crossroads) (Temporary Restriction and Prohibition of Traffic) Order (SI 2010/2097)
- The A1 Trunk Road (Eighton Lodge Interchange) (Temporary Prohibition of Traffic) Order (SI 2010/2098)
- The M6 Motorway (Junctions 33 – 34, Northbound Carriageway) (Temporary Restriction of Traffic) Order (SI 2010/2099)
- The M1 Motorway (Junction 35A, Stocksbridge) (Temporary Prohibition of Traffic) (2) Order (SI 2010/2100)

== 2101–2200 ==
- The A1 Trunk Road (North of Black Cat Roundabout, Bedfordshire to A14/A141 Brampton Hut Roundabout, Cambridgeshire) (Temporary Prohibition of Traffic) Order (SI 2010/2101)
- The M4 Motorway (Junction 4) (Temporary Restriction and Prohibition of Traffic) Order (SI 2010/2103)
- The M4 Motorway (Junctions 1 – 3) (Temporary Prohibition of Traffic) ( 2) Order (SI 2010/2104)
- The A180 Trunk Roads (Brocklesby Interchange to the B1210 Stallingborough Road Overbridge) (Temporary Restriction and Prohibition of Traffic) Order (SI 2010/2105)
- The M18 Motorway (Junction 3 to Junction 4) (Temporary Restriction and Prohibition of Traffic) Order (SI 2010/2106)
- The M40 Motorway (Junction 3 Loudwater to Junction 4 Handy Cross Interchange, Buckinghamshire) (Temporary Restriction and Prohibition of Traffic) Order (SI 2010/2107)
- The Tonbridge and Malling (Related Alterations) Order (SI 2010/2108)
- The Kirklees (Related Alterations) Order (SI 2010/2109)
- The M4 Motorway (Junctions 14 – 13, Eastbound) (Temporary Restriction and Prohibition of Traffic) Order (SI 2010/2110)
- The A14 Trunk Road (Ipswich Southern Bypass, Wherstead Interchange to Seven Hills Interchange, Suffolk) (Temporary Restriction and Prohibition of Traffic and Pedestrians) Order (SI 2010/2111)
- The M20 Motorway and the A20 Trunk Road (Havenfield Underbridge – M20 Junction 13) (Temporary Restriction and Prohibition of Traffic) Order (SI 2010/2112)
- The A3(M) Motorway and the A3 Trunk Road (A3(M) Junction 2 – Clanfield) (Temporary Restriction and Prohibition of Traffic) Order (SI 2010/2113)
- The A34 Trunk Road (Harwell – East Ilsley, Southbound) (Temporary Restriction of Traffic) Order (SI 2010/2114)
- The A20 Trunk Road (Courtwood Interchange – Limekiln Roundabout) (Temporary Restriction and Prohibition of Traffic) Order (SI 2010/2115)
- The M25 Motorway and the M23 Motorway (M25 Junctions 6 – 8) (Temporary Restriction and Prohibition of Traffic) Order (SI 2010/2116)
- The A616 Trunk Road (Westwood Roundabout to Newton Chambers Roundabout) (Temporary Prohibition of Traffic) Order (SI 2010/2117)
- The M181 Motorway (Midmoor Interchange to Frodingham Grange Roundabout) and the M180 Motorway (Temporary Prohibition of Traffic) (2) Order (SI 2010/2118)
- The M4 Motorway (Parks Farm Overbridge to Junction 18) (Temporary Restriction of Traffic) Order (SI 2010/2119)
- The A46 Trunk Road (Evesham, Worcestershire) (Temporary Prohibition of Traffic) Order (SI 2010/2120)
- The Air Navigation (Restriction of Flying) (West Wales Airport) ( 2) Regulations (SI 2010/2121)
- The Air Navigation (Restriction of Flying) (Liberal Democrat Party Conference Liverpool) Regulations (SI 2010/2122)
- The M42 Motorway (Junction 3) (Southbound Exit Slip Road) (Temporary Prohibition of Traffic) Order (SI 2010/2123)
- The M1 Motorway (Junctions 25 to 28) (Slip Roads) (Temporary Prohibition of Traffic) Order (SI 2010/2124)
- The M6 Motorway (Junction 6, Gravelly Hill) (Slip Roads) (Temporary Prohibition of Traffic) ( 3) Order (SI 2010/2125)
- The Social Security (Miscellaneous Amendments) ( 4) Regulations (SI 2010/2126)
- The Public Rights of Way (Combined Orders) (England) (Amendment) Regulations (SI 2010/2127)
- The Equality Act 2010 (Disability) Regulations (SI 2010/2128)
- The Children's Trust Board (Children and Young People's Plan) (England) (Revocation) Regulations (SI 2010/2129)
- The Care Standards Act 2000 (Registration)(England) Regulations (SI 2010/2130)
- The Electricity (Standards of Performance) (Amendment) Regulations (SI 2010/2131)
- The Equality Act 2010 (Sex Equality Rule) (Exceptions) Regulations (SI 2010/2132)
- The Equality Act (Age Exceptions for Pension Schemes) Order (SI 2010/2133)
- The Town and Country Planning (General Permitted Development) (Amendment) (2) (England) Order (SI 2010/2134)
- The Town and Country Planning (Compensation) (3) (England) Regulations (SI 2010/2135)
- Llangollen and Corwen Railway Order 2010 (SI 2010/2136)
- The M5 Motorway and the A46 Trunk Road (Junction 9, Gloucestershire) (Temporary Restriction and Prohibition of Traffic) Order (SI 2010/2137)
- The A49 Trunk Road (Near Callow, Herefordshire) (Temporary 10 Miles Per Hour and 40 Miles Per Hour Speed Limit) Order (SI 2010/2138)
- The A1 Trunk Road (Warenford to Adderstone Grange Junction) (Temporary Restriction and Prohibition of Traffic) Order (SI 2010/2139)
- The M56 Motorway Junction 9 (Westbound Link Roads to the M6 Motorway Northbound and the A50) (Temporary Prohibition of Traffic) Order (SI 2010/2140)
- The M62 Motorway (Junction 8 Westbound Entry Slip Road) (Temporary Prohibition of Traffic) Order (SI 2010/2141)
- The M6 Motorway (Junctions 41–42, Northbound and Southbound Carriageways) (Temporary Restriction of Traffic) Order (SI 2010/2142)
- The M6 Motorway (Junction 23 Northbound and Southbound Entry and Exit Slip Roads) (Temporary Prohibition of Traffic) Order (SI 2010/2143)
- The M53 Motorway (Junction 3 Northbound and Southbound Entry and Exit Slip Roads) (Temporary Prohibition of Traffic) Order (SI 2010/2144)
- The Radioactive Contaminated Land Regulations (Northern Ireland) (Amendment) Regulations (SI 2010/2145)
- The Radioactive Contaminated Land (Modification of Enactments) (Wales) (Amendment) Regulations (SI 2010/2146)
- The Radioactive Contaminated Land (Enabling Powers and Modification of Enactments) (England) (Amendment) Regulations (SI 2010/2147)
- The M27 Motorway (Junction 10, Westbound Exit Slip Road) (Temporary Restriction and Prohibition of Traffic) Order (SI 2010/2148)
- The M20 Motorway (Junctions 11 and 10, Slip Roads) (Temporary Prohibition of Traffic) Order (SI 2010/2149)
- The Pharmacy Order 2010 (Appeals – Transitional Provisions) Order of Council (SI 2010/2150)
- The A21 Trunk Road (Morley's Interchange – Vauxhall Lane Junction) (Temporary Prohibition of Traffic) Order (SI 2010/2151)
- The A11 Trunk Road (West of A11/B1172 Spooner Row Interchange to East of A11/B1135 Tuttles Lane Interchange, Wymondham Bypass, Norfolk) (Temporary Restriction and Prohibition of Traffic) Order (SI 2010/2152)
- The Radioactive Contaminated Land (Scotland) (Amendment) Regulations (SI 2010/2153)
- The Electricity (Applications for Licences, Modifications of an Area and Extensions and Restrictions of Licences) Regulations (SI 2010/2154)
- The Gas (Applications for Licences and Extensions and Restrictions of Licences) Regulations (SI 2010/2155)
- The Companies (Disclosure of Address) (Amendment) Regulations (SI 2010/2156)
- The Designation of Schools Having a Religious Character (Independent Schools) (England) ( 3) Order (SI 2010/2157)
- The Tonnage Tax (Training Requirement) (Amendment) Regulations (SI 2010/2158)
- The A14 Trunk Road (Hemingford Abbots Junction 25 to West of A1096 London Road/St Ives Interchange, Hemingford Grey, Junction 26, Cambridgeshire) (Temporary Prohibition of Traffic) Order (SI 2010/2159)
- The A1 Trunk Road (North of Carpenter's Lodge Junction to Wittering Road Junction, Stamford, Peterborough) (Temporary Restriction and Prohibition of Traffic) Order (SI 2010/2160)
- The Occupational Pension Schemes (Investment) (Amendment) Regulations (SI 2010/2161)
- The Air Navigation (Restriction of Flying) (Jet Formation Display Teams) ( 3) (Amendment) Regulations (SI 2010/2162)
- The A1(M) Motorway (South

== 2201–2300 ==
- Building Regulations 2010 (SI 2010/2214)
