= Child care in the United Kingdom =

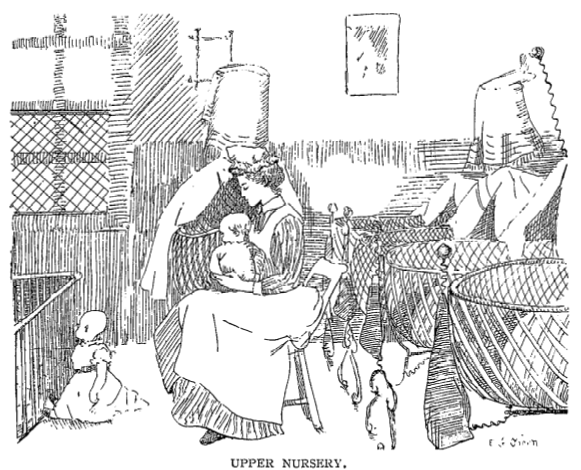
Mrs Hilton's crèche in London in 1889 for working mothers

Child care in the United Kingdom is supported by a combination of rights at work, public sector provision and private companies. Child care is usually undertaken by the parents, and more often the mother who takes leave from employment. Early childhood education in a crèche or nursery is not freely available from the public sector, while fee-paying pre-schools are.

== History ==
The first pre-school institution was opened in 1816 by Robert Owen in New Lanark, Scotland. The Hungarian countess Theresa Brunszvik followed in 1828. In 1837, Friedrich Fröbel opened one in Germany, coining the term "kindergarten".

Marie Hilton started a creche for the children of working mothers in a house in London's Stepney Causeway on 22 February 1871. By 1889 it was Mrs's Hilton's Creche, Infirmary and Orphan's Home and it occupied three houses. In 1896 Hilton died when there was 120 children in the creche.

== Leave from work ==
Since the United Kingdom is a mixed economy, the government provides free healthcare, pensions, and some free child care, making people less involved with the market economy relative to nation such as America. Consequently, there is a direct correlation between a family-wellbeing and its welfare. Because of the child poverty rate the United Kingdom experienced in the mid- to late 1990s, the government had to change taxes and imply the benefits, increasing the employment rate and supporting working families. For example, the Child and Working Tax Credits were introduced. Rights to leave from work to care for children have important consequences for career advancement and gender equality. The United Kingdom provides 11 months of a legal maternal/parental leave. There is a dependency between the atmosphere a child experienced while growing up and his/her future life. The people who take care of a child can vary: kid's own family, in which mother or/and father takes a leave in order to take care of a child, nannies, foster care, and nurseries; and, consequently, child's experience of transformation into a teenager can vary. Moreover, a child's future perception differs depending on who spent more time with a kid: a mother or a father. Historically, man is a breadwinner and 'good' father is a financially successful man but the father-child relations are crucial and essential in a child's growing up. However, the British parental leave system assumes, first of all, mother's responsibility to take care of children (maternal leave) while father's care (paternal leave) is seen as a question of individual choice.

=== Maternity leave ===
The major right, which goes beyond the minimum set by the Pregnant Workers Directive, is a mix of paid and unpaid maternity leave. A contract of employment can always be and often is more generous. Otherwise, the minimum right to paid maternity leave arises for women employees after 26 weeks' work, though the right to unpaid leave has no qualifying period. Under the Maternity and Parental Leave etc. Regulations 1999 (SI 1999/3312) mothers must take compulsory leave at the time of child birth for two weeks. After that comes a right to 6 weeks' leave paid at 90 per cent of ordinary salary. Then is 20 weeks' leave paid at a rate set by statute, which was £123.06 per week in 2010. This has to be at least the same level as statutory sick pay. Then she may take additional but unpaid maternity leave for another 26 weeks. She must tell the employer 15 weeks before the date of the expected birth, in writing if the employer requests it. Except insofar as they administer the payments, employers do not bear most costs of maternity leave as they are reimbursed by the government according to their size and national insurance contributions. Along with different forms of leave, mothers have the right to not suffer any professional detriment or dismissal while they are absent, and should be able to return to the same job after 26 weeks, or another suitable job after 52 weeks.

=== Paternity leave ===
For fathers, the position is less generous. To redress the balance between how much of child raising each partner bears, under the Additional Paternity Leave Regulations 2010 it will be possible for a woman to transfer up to 26 weeks of her leave entitlements to her male partner. Otherwise the Paternity and Adoption Leave Regulations 2002 state that a man is entitled to a minimum of just 2 weeks off, at the statutory rate of pay.

=== Parental leave ===
Both parents may also benefit from "parental leave" provisions in the MPLR 1999, passed after the Parental Leave Directive. Until a child turns 5, or a disabled child turns 18, parents can take up to 13 weeks' unpaid leave. Unless there is another collective agreement in place, employees should give 21 days' notice, no more than 4 weeks in a year, at least 1 week at a time, and the employer can postpone the leave for 6 months if business would be unduly disrupted. Otherwise similar provisions apply on employees not suffering detriment or dismissal and having a right to their previous jobs back.

== Maternity and Parental Leave etc. Regulations 1999 ==
The Maternity and Parental Leave etc. Regulations 1999 (SI 1999/3312) is a statutory instrument, concerning UK labour law, which details the rights to maternity and parental leave for employees in the United Kingdom.

=== Contents ===
- r 4(1) 'An employee is entitled to ordinary maternity leave and to additional maternity leave' if she notifies the employer of expected birth at least 15 weeks before (3 and a half months) (1A) and the date can be varied with 28 days' notice (2) in writing if the employer wants it, and it can start any time up to eleven weeks before the expected week of birth
- [r 5 used to require a 26-week qualifying period by the 14th week before the expected week of childbirth, repealed by SI 2006/2014]
- r 6 maternity leave is automatically triggered by absence of work 'wholly or partly because of pregnancy' in the four weeks before the expected week
- r 7, right to 18 weeks' ordinary (paid) maternity leave and 29 weeks' additional (unpaid) maternity leave (6) to return to work 28 days' notice should be given, (7) no notice needed if the full period of leave is taken
- r 8, two weeks' compulsory leave and four weeks for factory workers, or longer where statute requires
- r 9 Exclusion of entitlement to remuneration during ordinary maternity leave
- r 10 Redundancy during maternity leave
- r 11, the mother must give 21 days' notice of her intention to return during a maternity leave period, and if not lose pay.
- r 12, requirement to notify intention to return at which point after additional maternity leave, if requested by the employer, and if not lose dismissal and detriment protection.
- r 13 employees that have worked a year and expect to have responsibility for a child can take parental leave for the purpose of caring for that child
- r 14 thirteen weeks for any individual child
- r 15 the right drops away (a) after the child's fifth birthday (b) or eighteenth birthday for a disabled child (c) or five years and before the eighteenth birthday of an adopted child
- r 16 if an employee's contract contains no provisions on parental leave, and there is no applicable collective agreement, then the default rules in Sch 2 apply
- r 17(a) an employee who takes additional maternity leave retains the right to mutual trust and confidence, compensation for redundancy, disciplinary and grievance procedures and (b) is bound by all the corresponding rights to good faith
- r 18 a woman is entitled to the job she had before absence after ordinary leave; or another suitable and appropriate job if returning after additional leave
- r 18A the right to return means at the same seniority, with the same pension and pay, or terms not less favourable
- r 20 a prescribed kind of reason for unfair dismissal is where the employee is redundant and r 10 (right to suitable alternative employment if redundant) is not complied with
- r 20(3) a prescribed kind of reason for unfair dismissal is (a) pregnancy (b) birth (c) suspension on medical grounds under ERA 1996 s 66(2) (d) seeking to take maternity leave (e) seeking to take (i) additional maternity leave (ee) failing to return where there was (i) no rr 7(6)-(7) notification (ii) the employer gave less than 28 days' notice. [r 20(6) was removed by 2000/73/EC and one of the four amending instruments]
- r 20(7) not a prescribed kind of dismissal, for a woman on ordinary or additional maternity leave, where (a) not reasonably practicable, (b) an associated employer has a job, and (c) she accepts or unreasonably refuses the offer
- r 21 employees can take whichever is more favourable out of the contractual or statutory entitlement, but not both
- Sch 2, paras 1-5, evidence of parenthood may be provided, and 21 days' notice to take the leave should be given
- para 6, the employer can postpone leave for up to six months if business would be 'unduly disrupted'
- para 7, leave can be taken only in blocks of not less than one week at a time, unless the child gets a disability living allowance
- para 8, no more than four weeks in any one year can be taken

=== Related provisions ===
The Social Security Contributions and Benefits Act 1992 sections 164-171 contain rules relating to the level of pay for people while on maternity leave.

- s 165, the maximum paid maternity leave period can be set at [52 weeks].
- s 166, statutory maternity pay is 90% of one's normal average weekly earnings for 6 weeks.
- s 167, employers are reimbursed according to their size and national insurance contributions.

The Statutory Maternity Pay Regulations 1986 (SI 1986/1960) regulation 6, which is periodically updated, contains the amount for statutory maternity pay.

- r 6, for the remaining period of paid maternity leave, the rate is [£128.73] per week (since 3 April 2011).

=== Emergency leave ===
"Emergency leave" is, under ERA 1996 section 57A, available for employees to deal with birth or a child's issues at school, as well as other emergencies such as dependents' illness or death, so long as the employee informs the employer as soon as reasonably practicable. In Qua v John Ford Morrison Solicitors Cox J emphasised that there is no requirement to deliver daily updates.

== Non-familial care ==
Contemporary Western society is witnessing a major expansion of early childhood services. One of the ways of taking care experience for a kid in the UK is a in-home child care, which is a government supported, non-familial care provided in the child's home. Historically, nannies took care of children in private homes of nobles. To continue this tradition in modern society, the government began to subsidise and regulate such arrangements. Since the number of employed women increased, it was necessary for the government to create programs that would benefit both women and their kids. In 2009, it was estimated that there were 63,000 nannies or non-relative careers to help families in the UK. Even nowadays, nannies are considered to be a privilege of wealthy families, putting the limitations on the working class sample. That is one of the reasons why the UK has different programs that help lower- and middle-class families to take care of their children. Since the UK is a liberal market economy (LME), it relies heavily on market mechanism to deliver the programs.

== Requesting flexible working ==
Beyond the period around child birth, after EA 2002, employees gained the right to request flexible working patterns for the purpose of caring for a child under the age of 6, or a disabled child under age 18. The right to make the request is contained in ERA 1996 section 80F, and despite the fact that employers may decline the request, statistics show that under the obligation to consider, employers grant requests in 80 per cent of cases. An employee must make the request in writing, the employer must reply in writing, and can only decline the request on the basis of a correct fact assessment, and within 8 grounds listed in section 80G, which generally concern business and organisational necessity. In Commotion Ltd v Rutty a toy warehouse assistant was refused a reduction to part-time work because, according to the manager, everyone needed to work full-time to maintain "team spirit". The Employment Appeal Tribunal ruled that because "team spirit" was not one of the legitimate grounds for refusal, Mrs Rutty should get compensation, which is set at a maximum of 8 weeks' pay.

- Instituto nazionale della providenza social v Bruno [2010] IRLR 890, part-time workers and occupational pensions
- Apprenticeships, Skills, Children and Learning Act 2009 (c 22)

== Pre school ==
=== Private nurseries ===
- Nursery school

=== Sure start ===
Children's Centres are expected to provide:

- In centres in the 30% most disadvantaged areas: integrated early learning and childcare (early-years provision) for a minimum of 10 hours a day, five days a week, 48 weeks a year; and support for a childminder network
- In centres in the 70% least disadvantaged areas, which do not elect to offer early-years provision: drop-in activity sessions for children, such as stay-and-play sessions
- Family Support, including support and advice on parenting, information about services available in the area and access to specialist, targeted services; and Parental Outreach
- Child and Family Health Services, such as antenatal and postnatal support, information and guidance on breastfeeding, health and nutrition, smoking cessation support, and speech and language therapy and other specialist support
- Links with Jobcentre Plus to encourage and support parents and carers who wish to consider training and employment
- Quick and easy access to wider services

=== Other schools ===
- Children's Regional Planning Committee
- Timeline of young people's rights in the United Kingdom

== See also ==
- Ageing of Europe
- Cost of raising a child
