= Parental leave in Italy =

In Italy, maternity leave is compulsory and women must take up to two months off from work before her due date and three months off after the baby's birth. In certain scenarios, women may ask their employers for more time off before the baby's due date if her pregnancy is considered at risk and if her workplace puts her health or her baby's in danger. In some instances, women can request to work up to one month before her due date with the approval of her doctor and employer. However, this means that she will have to take a total of four months off after the birth of her child.

== Paternity leave ==
Fathers are also obligated to take a ten-day paid leave of absence from work during the five months of maternity leave. The mother has the option to extend the father's paternal leave if she transfers one of her maternity days to him.

== Parental leave ==
One parent or both parents have the option to take up to 11 months of leave from work during the first eight years of their child's life. Parental leave allowance is significantly less than maternity leave allowance; parental leave is only 30% of one's wages.

== Maternity allowance ==
These pensions are funded by the INPS (National Institute for Social Security) which are financed by the employers and employees through the rate established by the employment sector. Workers can either be paid from INPS or through the employer who is compensated by the INPS. During the five-month leave, women are paid up to 80% of their wage but companies usually pay for the remainder 20%.

== International minimum standards ==
The Maternity Protection Convention, 2000 requires at least 14 weeks of maternity leave. In the European Union, the Pregnant Workers Directive requires at least 14 weeks of maternity leave; while the Work–Life Balance Directive requires at least 10 days of paternity leave, as well as at least 4 months of parental leave, with 2 months being non-transferable.
