= Sick leave =

Policy allowing paid time off from work for health needs

Sick leave (or paid sick days or sick pay) is paid time off from work that workers can use to stay home to address their health needs without losing pay. It differs from paid vacation time or time off work to deal with personal matters, because sick leave is intended for health-related purposes. Sick leave can include a mental health day and taking time away from work to go to a scheduled doctor's appointment. Some policies also allow paid sick time to be used to care for sick family members, or to address health and safety needs related to domestic violence or sexual assault. Menstrual leave is another type of time off work for a health-related reason, but it is not always paid.

In most nations, some or all employers are required to pay their employees for some time away from work when they are ill. Most European, many Latin American, a few African, and a few Asian countries have legal requirements for paid sick leave for employees. In nations without laws mandating paid sick leave, some employers offer it voluntarily or as the result of a collective bargaining agreement. However, in countries with poorer labor laws such as South Korea, employees are usually forced to use paid vacation time for sick leaves, and the sick leaves exceeding the remaining vacation time are unpaid. Even where sick leave is normally required for all employees, the business owner may not be considered an employee or have access to paid sick leave, especially in a microbusiness that is operated by the owners.

The labor movement has historically and to the present fought for paid sick leave as a fundamental workers' rights. Private employers may often provide paid sick leave, even when not required to, in order to attract and retain qualified or scarce labor. The economic rationale for paid sick leave is that it reduces negative externalities, such as contagious people making others in the workplace sick, whereas the downside to paid sick leave is that it may encourage excessive absenteeism. Paid sick leave can reduce employee turnover, increase productivity, and reduce the spread of disease in the workplace and in the community.

== Impact ==
Studies show that workers are less likely to take time off for injury or illness when they do not have paid sick leave. Workers without paid sick leave are also less likely to obtain preventive medical care, such as cancer screenings and flu shots. Workers with paid sick leave are less likely to experience workplace injuries. Paid sick leave can reduce the overall frequency of time off work, as workers are less likely to spread disease to co-workers and the surrounding community. Parents who have access to paid sick leave are more likely to take time away from work to care for their sick children. Working parents without paid sick days may feel compelled to send their sick children to school, where the children spread infections to other students and school staff, and additionally experience negative short- and long-term health outcomes themselves.

Workers without paid sick leave will go to work while sick, spreading the infections to other workers. Nearly seven in ten U.S. workers (68 percent) report they have gone to work with the stomach flu or other contagious disease. Nearly half reported that they went to work sick because they could not afford to lose the pay. Thirty percent of workers report they contracted the flu from a colleague. According to a 2020 study, requiring paid sick leave in Washington state led to a reduction in the number of workers who reported working while sick.

In 2010, a non-random survey of some New York City employers by the Partnership for New York City estimated that introducing a new paid sick leave mandate, in which employees of small businesses would get a minimum of five days paid sick leave per year and employees of large businesses would get a minimum of nine days paid sick leave per year, would increase total payroll expenses in the city by 0.3%, with the burden largely falling on the fraction of businesses that did not already pay for any sick leave, or that offered sick leave only to long-time employees. The total cost of providing paid sick leave in that high-cost market was estimated to be around 40 or 50 cents per hour worked.

Presenteeism costs the U.S. economy $180 billion annually in lost productivity. For employers, this costs an average of $255 per employee per year and exceeds the cost of absenteeism and medical and disability benefits. For workers in the foodservice industry, one analysis found that foodborne illness outbreak for a chain restaurant – including negative public opinion, which affects other operations in a metropolitan area – can be up to $7 million.

== Existing provisions ==
At least 145 countries require paid sick leave for short- or long-term illnesses, with 127 providing a week or more annually.

=== European Union ===
Each European Union (EU) Member State has domestic sick leave and sickness benefits:

- Sick leave is a right to be absent from work during sickness and return to one's job when recovered.
- Sickness benefit is a social protection system paid at a fixed rate of previous earnings or a flat rate.

In most of those States, some law, collective agreement, or employer choice may provide sick pay, in the form of a time-limited continuous payment of salary by the employer.

Directive 92/85 gives women the right to a minimum of 14 weeks of maternity leave including two compulsory weeks, paid at least at the national sick pay level.

In 2009, the Court of Justice of the EU considered that workers on long-term sick leave will not lose their right to holiday pay where they have been unable to take the holiday by virtue of being on sick leave: a worker cannot be deprived of the right to paid holiday when he or she has not had the opportunity to take it.

Directive 2019/1158 gives men paternity leave: fathers or second parents have the right to take at least ten working days of paternity leave compensated at least at the national sick pay level.

EU minimum compulsory sick pay is 25% in Slovakia while the maximum is 100% in Belgium and Finland.

Sickness benefit replacement rates range from 50% to 100% of the gross or net salary. The average flat-rate sickness benefit is around 20% in Malta and the UK (the latter of which was bound to EU rules until 2021).

In recent decades many countries have reduced sickness benefits by introducing waiting periods, reduced income replacement rates, and sick pay.

Women use more sick leave than men and older people more than younger people.

The sustainability of sickness benefit schemes is related to the nature of the agreement between the employer and the social security system.

At the opposite, some people work during illness – presenteeism – which raises other issues.

=== Australia ===
Sick leave originated in trade union campaigns for its inclusion in industrial agreements. In Australia, it began to be introduced into industrial awards in 1922. From 1935 to the 1970s, paid sick leave was gradually introduced into federal awards until 10 days sick leave per year became standard.

Under the Federal Government's industrial relations legislation, known as Fair Work, eligible employees are entitled to 10 days of paid personal leave (sick/carer's leave) per year, which also carries over to subsequent years if not used.

In addition, Australian workers may be entitled to two days of compassionate leave for each permissible occasion where a member of their family or household contracts or develops a personal illness or sustains a personal injury that poses a threat to their life, or dies.

=== China ===
In China, workers are entitled to a statutory medical treatment period for non-work-related illnesses or injuries, ranging from 3 to 24 months depending on their cumulative work history and seniority with their current employer.

The duration of this protected medical leave scales based on the following statutory rules:

- Under 10 years of total career experience: Entitled to 3 months of leave (if under 5 years with the current employer) or 6 months (if over 5 years).
- 10 to 20 years of total career experience: Entitled to 6 to 18 months of leave, scaling up with tenure at the current firm.
- Over 20 years of total career experience: Entitled to a maximum cap of 24 months of protected leave.

During this medical period, employees are protected against termination, and employers must pay sick leave wages. While local regulations vary by city, national guidelines mandate that sick pay cannot fall below 80% of the local minimum wage. After the 24-month statutory maximum is exhausted, any extension is subject to strict medical evaluation by a local Labor Capacity Appraisal Centre rather than being an automatic entitlement.

=== France ===
In France paid sick leave is paid partly by social security (Sécurité sociale) and partly by the employer. It requires a medical justification no later than 48 hours after the first sick day. Social security pays only one part of the treatment, starting on the fourth day, and can make controls. The employer pays an additional part depending on collective agreement and legislation. Basic legislation requires that an employee working for more than one year, starting at the eighth sick day, social security and employer together provide 90% of the salary for at least 30 days. Ratio and number of days are computed according to the number of years worked in the company.

Other legislation and agreements apply in other contexts, such as sick children, pregnancy, and paternity leave.

Since 2011, civil servants are not paid for the first day of a sick leave ("jour de carence"). This rule was abolished in 2014, and then reinstated again since January 2018.

=== Germany ===
In Germany, employers are legally required to provide at least six weeks of sick leave per illness at full salary if the employee can present a medical certificate of being ill (which is issued on a standard form). The salary paid during sick leave is partially refunded to employers.

After these six weeks, an employee who is insured in the statutory health insurance (Gesetzliche Krankenversicherung) receives about 70% of their last salary, paid by the insurance. According to § 48 SGB V (social code 5) the health insurance pays for a maximum of 78 weeks in case of a specific illness within a period of three years. In case another illness appears during the time when the employee is already on sick leave then the new illness will have no effect on the maximum duration of the payment. Only if the patient returns to work and falls sick again with a new diagnosis will the payment be extended.

Fathers and mothers who are insured in the statutory health insurance and are raising a child younger than 12 years also have the right to paid leave if the child is sick (Kinderkrankengeld). The insurance pays for a maximum of 10 days per parent and per child (20 days for a single parent), limited to 25 days per year per parent (50 for a single parent).

For patients with private health insurance, payments beyond the legally mandated first six weeks depend on the insurance contract.

=== India ===
Sick leave (also called medical leave in India) is the leave that an employee is legally entitled to when the employee is out of work due to illness. Medical leaves can be taken for a minimum of 0.5 to a maximum of 12 working days with 100% pay or a maximum of 24 days with 50% pay per employee per year. It is wholly paid by the employer (unless the employee is covered by the Employees' State Insurance, in which case, ESI covers 80% of it while the rest is borne by the employer for 90 consecutive days). For all absences exceeding 2 consecutive days, a medical certificate from a doctor needs to be enclosed stating the reason and duration of the illness.

=== Poland ===
In Poland, employees receive 80% of their normal pay while on sick leave (100% in some specific cases). For the first 33 days in a calendar year (or 14 days, in case of employees who are over 50 years old), this is covered by the employer. After that, the payment is made by the Social Insurance Institution (ZUS). A medical certificate is required in every case. During the sick leave in Poland employees are protected from termination of employment. The employment contract with a sick employee can be dissolved only after expiration of protection periods regulated in art. 53 of the Labor Code, which depend on employee's service length at the company. The longest protection period may last up to 182 days of sick leave (or 270 days in the case of illness during pregnancy or tuberculosis) and may be prolonged for another 3 months if employee applies for rehabilitation benefit from social security.

=== Sweden ===
Sweden has paid sick leave. Prior to 2019 the first sick day (Swedish: sjukdag) was unpaid, whereas since 2019 a deduction (Swedish: sjukdagsavdrag) of 20% of a worker's average weekly pay is made, which is intended to make the system fairer for non-salaried workers. After that day a minimum of 80% of the income is paid for 364 days and 75% for a further maximum 550 days. Collective employment contracts may specify a higher payment. A medical doctor must certify the illness no later than one week after the first sick day. The parent of a sick child (under 12) can get paid leave to care for the child (termed "temporary parental leave"). In that case the first day is also paid. The state pays all these benefits, except for the first two weeks of sick leave for employees, which is paid by the employer.

=== United Kingdom ===
The UK has sick leave, currently paid for up to 28 weeks at £116.75 per week, with the first three days unpaid. A medical certificate (called "fit note" or "sick note") is only required for leave longer than 7 days, inclusive of non-working days.

=== United States ===
California Governor Gavin Newsom speaks about sick leave for essential workers during the COVID-19 pandemic in 2020.

There is no federal requirement that employers in United States provide paid sick leave to employees. In March 2026, 81 percent of private-industry workers had access to paid sick leave, according to the U.S. Bureau of Labor Statistics. Some states and local jurisdictions require it. (The federal Family and Medical Leave Act of 1993 (FMLA) mandates only unpaid leave and accrued vacation.) The Families First Coronavirus Response Act, passed by Congress and signed into law by President Trump in March 2020, mandated that the federal government implement paid sick leave for some workers.

A 2009 analysis from the Bureau of Labor Statistics (BLS) found that around 39% of American workers in the private sector do not have paid sick leave. Around 79% of workers in low-wage industries do not have paid sick time. Most food service and hotel workers (78%) lack paid sick days.

A 2008 survey reported that 77% of Americans believe that having paid sick days is "very important" for workers. Some workers report that they or a family member have been fired or suspended for missing work due to illness.

A 2020 paper found that requiring paid sick leave in the U.S. likely increased overall well-being. When paid sick leave is required by law, workers tended to take two more days off work each year.

U.S. federal law requires unpaid leave for serious illnesses through the Family and Medical Leave Act (FMLA). This law requires most medium-sized and larger employers to comply and, within those businesses, covers employees who have worked for their employer for at least 12 months prior to taking the leave.

During the 2009 H1N1 influenza outbreak, the U.S. Centers for Disease Control (CDC) recommended that anyone with flu-like symptoms remain at home. According to a report from the Institute for Women's Policy Research, more than eight million workers went to their jobs while sick during the H1N1 pandemic.

In 2008, a sick employee at a Chipotle restaurant in Kent, Ohio likely caused an outbreak that resulted in over 500 people becoming ill. The outbreak cost that community between $130,233 and $305,337 in lost wages, lost productivity, and health care costs.

==== State and local laws ====
Since 2006 and as of 2024, 17 states, Washington D.C., and an increasing number of other cities have implemented some form of paid sick leave.

States with paid sick leave laws
State	Date of taking effect	Legalization method
Connecticut	January 1, 2012	Public Act No. 11-52 signed into law by Governor Dannel Malloy on July 1, 2011.
California	January 1, 2015 / July 1, 2015	Legislation signed into law by Governor Jerry Brown in 2014.
Massachusetts	July 1, 2015	Question 4 passed by voters in November 2014.
Oregon	January 1, 2016	Legislation (SB 454) signed into law by Governor Kate Brown in 2015.
Vermont	January 1, 2017	HB 187 signed into law by Governor Peter Shumlin on March 9, 2016.
Arizona	July 1, 2017	Proposition 206 (Fair Wages and Healthy Families Act) passed by voters in November 2016.
Washington	January 1, 2018	Initiative 1433 passed by voters in November 2016.
Rhode Island	July 1, 2018	Legislation signed into law by Governor Gina Raimondo in 2017.
Maryland	February 11, 2018	In January 2018, the State Legislature overrode a veto of Governor Larry Hogan.
New Jersey	October 29, 2018	Legislation signed by Governor Phil Murphy on May 2, 2018.
Michigan	March 29, 2019	In September 2018, the State Legislature approved a ballot initiative, effectively making it law.
Nevada	January 1, 2020	Legislation signed by Governor Steve Sisolak on June 12, 2019.
Maine	January 1, 2021	Legislation (LD 369) signed into law by Governor Janet Mills on May 28, 2019.
New York	January 1, 2021	Legislation signed into law by Governor Andrew Cuomo on April 3, 2020.
Colorado	January 1, 2021 / January 1, 2022	Legislation signed into law by Governor Jared Polis on July 14, 2020.
New Mexico	July 1, 2022	Legislation signed into law by Governor Michelle Lujan Grisham on April 8, 2021.
Illinois	January 1, 2024	Legislation signed into law by Governor J. B. Pritzker on March 13, 2023.
Minnesota	January 1, 2024	Legislation signed into law by Governor Tim Walz on May 24, 2023, as part of a paid family and medical leave bill.

In November 2006, the voters of San Francisco passed a ballot initiative making the city the first in the country to guarantee paid sick days to all workers.

In March 2008, the Washington, D.C. Council voted unanimously to pass legislation guaranteeing workers paid sick time. The law does not cover tipped restaurant workers or workers in the first year of employment. The D.C. law was also the first in the United States to include paid "safe" days for victims of domestic violence, sexual assault, or stalking.

On July 1, 2011, Connecticut Governor Dannel P. Malloy signed into law Public Act No. 11-52 which made Connecticut the first state to mandate paid sick leave. The Act, which only narrowly passed through Connecticut's Senate (18–17) and House of Representatives (76–65), took effect on January 1, 2012, and requires employers to allow their "service workers" to earn one hour of paid sick leave for every 40 hours worked, capped at a maximum of 40 hours per year. The Act applies to the "service workers" of employers with 50 or more employees in Connecticut during any single quarter in the previous year.

On September 8, 2014, California Governor Jerry Brown announced that he would sign the Healthy Workplaces, Healthy Families Act of 2014 to require employers to offer paid sick leave to employees. California would become the second state after Connecticut to require paid days off for ill employees.

On November 4, 2014, Massachusetts voters approved "Question 4", a ballot measure mandating sick pay for all part-time and full-time workers at firms with more than 11 employees. The law was passed 59–41 and came into effect July 1, 2015.

On June 12, 2015, the Oregon legislature passed OL 537, 2015 mandating sick pay for all workers at businesses with at least ten employees (six for cities with more than 500,000 inhabitants, e.g. Portland) effective January 1, 2016.

On May 23, 2023, the Minnesota legislature presented portions of the state's biennial budget to the governor's office which included a new requirement for "earned sick and safe time" (ESST). The following day, these portions were signed into law by Governor Tim Walz to take effect on January 1, 2024. The new law requires all employers in Minnesota to provide one hour of paid time off for every 30 hours worked, up to 48 hours of accrued time off per year, for all employees who work at least 80 hours per year, unless the employer's existing leave policies or a collective bargaining agreement meet or exceed the requirements of the law. The law does not preempt local ordinances related to paid sick leave, and employers are required to follow whichever ESST requirements are more favorable to employees.

=== Other countries ===
At least 145 countries provide paid sick days for short- or long-term illnesses, with 127 providing a week or more annually. 98 countries guarantee one month or more of paid sick days.

Many high-income economies require employers to provide paid sick days upwards of 10 days, including: the Netherlands, Ireland (from 2026), Switzerland, Sweden, Denmark, Finland, and Singapore.

== History ==
Already in 1500 BCE, at least some of the workers who built the tombs of Egyptian pharaohs received paid sick leave as well as state-supported health care.

== Culture ==
Some employees experience a sense of guilt when taking sick leave. Nicknamed "sick guilt", it may be due to a toxic work environment with poor work-life balance. In healthcare, sick guilt may be exacerbated by the knowledge that patient care may be delayed.

Employees may be negatively judged for either taking a sick day or showing up contagious. Nicknamed "sick shaming", this workplace dynamic can be construed as bullying, especially for afflicted by chronic conditions. In the United States, sick shaming has led to an overuse of cold medicine.

== See also ==
- Annual leave
- Broodfonds
- Employee benefit
- Labour and employment law
- List of statutory minimum employment leave by country
- Long service leave
- Medical Care and Sickness Benefits Convention, 1969
- Parental leave
- Presenteeism
- Social security
- Wage theft
