= Maternity leave and the Organisation for Economic Co-operation and Development =

Supplier of research and data pertaining to parental-leave rights

The Organisation for Economic Co-operation and Development provides data about OECD countries related to paid parental leave length, average pay rate and full-rate equivalent. Not all countries provide mothers with a pay rate equal to what they would have received if the absence had not occurred.

Rate of basic pay can be defined as fixed pay received through minimum wage law or an administratively-determined wage. Organizations and activists are working to inform, persuade and change pay-rate laws. Women in the workforce are at a disadvantage; regardless of legislation, a global gender pay gap is still visible. The OECD is a primary supplier of research and data pertaining to parental-leave rights.

== Background ==
Parental leave, or family leave, is an employee benefit available in almost all countries. The term "parental leave" may include maternity, paternity, and adoption leave; or may be used distinctively from "maternity leave" and "paternity leave" to describe separate family leave available to either parent to care for small children. In some countries and jurisdictions, "family leave" also includes leave provided to care for ill family members. Often, the minimum benefits and eligibility requirements are stipulated by law.

Unpaid parental or family leave is provided when an employer is required to hold an employee's job while that employee is taking leave. Paid parental or family leave provides paid time off work to care for or make arrangements for the welfare of a child or dependent family member. The three most common models of funding are government-mandated social insurance/social security (where employees, employers, or taxpayers in general contribute to a specific public fund), employer liability (where the employer must pay the employee for the length of leave), and mixed policies that combine both social security and employer liability.

Parental leave has been available as a legal right and/or governmental program for many years, in one form or another. In 2014, the International Labour Organization reviewed parental leave policies in 185 countries and territories, and found that all countries except Papua New Guinea have laws mandating some form of parental leave. A different study showed that of 186 countries examined, 96% offered some pay to mothers during leave, but only 44% of those countries offered the same for fathers. The United States, Suriname, Papua New Guinea, and a few island countries in the Pacific Ocean are the only countries in the United Nations that do not require employers to provide paid time off for new parents. Private employers sometimes provide either or both unpaid and paid parental leave outside of or in addition to any legal mandate.

Research has linked paid parental leave to better health outcomes for children, as well as mothers.

== By country ==
For policies in different countries, see Parental_leave#By_country (note: in many countries there are different types of leave: for example, maternity leave, paternity leave, and parental leave; these terms are often misused or confused). Comparing the length of maternity leave (which is common in international rankings) may say very little about the situation of a family in a specific country. A country for example may have a long maternity leave but a short (or non-existent) parental or family leave, or vice versa. In the European Union, the Pregnant Workers Directive requires at least 14 weeks of maternity leave; while the Work–Life Balance Directive requires at least 10 days of paternity leave, as well as at least 4 months of parental leave, with 2 months being non-transferable.
