= Parental leave =

Time taken off to care for a newborn

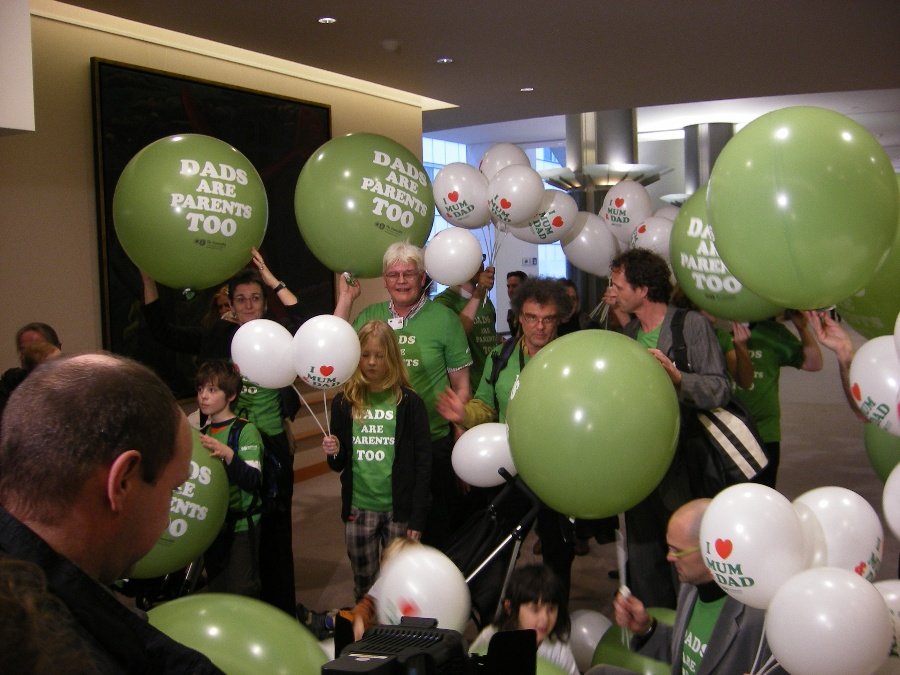
Demonstration for parental leave in the European Parliament

Parental leave, or family leave, is an employee benefit available in almost all countries. The term "parental leave" may include maternity, paternity, and adoption leave; or may be used distinctly from "maternity leave" and "paternity leave" to describe separate family leave available to either parent to care for their own children. In some countries and jurisdictions, "family leave" also includes leave provided to care for ill family members. Often, the minimum benefits and eligibility requirements are stipulated by law.

Unpaid parental or family leave is provided when an employer is required to hold an employee's job while that employee is taking leave. Paid parental or family leave provides paid time off work to care for or make arrangements for the welfare of a child or dependent family member. The three most common models of funding are government-mandated social insurance/social security (where employees, employers, or taxpayers in general contribute to a specific public fund), employer liability (where the employer must pay the employee for the length of leave), and mixed policies that combine both social security and employer liability.

Parental leave has been available as a legal right or governmental program for many years in one form or another. In 2014, the International Labour Organization reviewed parental leave policies in 185 countries and territories, and found that all countries except Papua New Guinea have laws mandating some form of parental leave. A different study showed that of 186 countries examined, 96% offered some pay to mothers during leave, but only 44% of those countries offered the same for fathers. The Marshall Islands, Micronesia, Nauru, Palau, Papua New Guinea, Tonga, and the United States are the only seven countries in the United Nations that do not require employers to provide paid time off for new parents. Private employers sometimes provide either or both unpaid and paid parental leave outside of or in addition to any legal mandate.

Research has linked paid parental leave to better health outcomes for children, as well as mothers.

== Parental leave uptake ==
=== Peer effects ===
Research has demonstrated that the duration of parental leave among individuals is influenced by peer behaviour. For example, if a mother notices a coworker opting for a longer parental leave, the probability of her to also increase their maternity leave increases. Welteke and Worhlich (2019) article found that expectant mothers who had peers taking parental leave of longer than ten months were thirty percent more likely to also take more than ten months off compared to expectant parents whose peers took a shorter leave. The influence of peer effects is not solely present to expectant mothers but also fathers. Research in Norway found that expectant fathers were 11 percent more likely to take paternity leave if they witnessed their coworkers use this benefit. In addition to coworkers, expectant fathers were 15 percent more likely to use paternity leave if their brother also used the program. Dahl et al., (2014) research additionally found a snowball effect occurring in workplaces where fathers using paternity leave.This means with every additional coworker using benefits of parental leave in the office, the likelihood of others to also use the program benefits.

There are competing arguments to why peers have an influence to the duration of paternal leave of an expecting parent. The first hypothesis stems from mothers learning from their peers about parental leave programs they were previously unaware of. This increase in awareness would lead to more mothers using parental leave for a longer duration. A competing hypothesis states that when coworkers increase their pregnancy leave, there becomes a change in the social norms of that workplace. This phenomenon is known as "herd behaviour" in which an alteration of the traditional habits in the workplace shifted the behaviour of the employees.

=== Uptake of parental leave for fathers ===
Several factors influence the uptake of parental leave by expectant fathers. For example, research has found that fathers who had a secondary education were 28% more likely to take parental leave programs longer than fathers who did not receive secondary education. Furthermore, fathers with a tertiary education were 67% more likely to take parental leave of longer than two months than dads with secondary education.

Additionally, the income levels of fathers have been noted to influence the uptake of fathers' parental leave. Low-income fathers are less likely to use parental leave, and if they did take off time, it is shorter in duration compared to fathers with a higher income. The discrepancies between the two demographics may be due to fathers with lower incomes being restricted by personal finances. Fathers in heterosexual relationships are even less likely to take parental leave if the mother is a low earner herself. The mother's low income positively correlates with the father taking little to no parental leave. This may be due to the father wanting the mother to take longer leave or other factors; such as the pressure to provide for the household financially.

Research in Sweden found that foreign-born fathers are less likely to partake in parental leave than Swedish-born fathers. The authors have theorized that this result might reflect greater instability of labour markets for first-generation migrants. Additionally, there is a greater likelihood for first-generation immigrants to lack access to information concerning parental leave can contribute to the decrease in uptake from this demographic.

Another aspect that influences the uptake of parental leave is gender dynamics at home and work. In households with a positive association between fatherhood involvement and egalitarian values, the father use of parental leave is increased. Workplace environments that promote parental leave for fathers as essential create a greater likelihood of these dads taking parental leave for a longer duration. In contrast, a workplace culture that views paternal leave as an indicator of poor work habits and as "feminine" causes fathers in that environment to be less likely to participate in parental leave. In Australia it has been argued, by Georgie Dent, that the uptake of parental leave by fathers could enable the workforce participation of women, leading to improved economic outcomes for families as well as the country.

=== Eligibility and uptake of parental leave for mothers ===
The eligibility and uptake of parental leave programs are not consistent among all demographics of expecting mothers. In most European countries, parental leave is granted to parents, usually after maternity and paternity leave. In some countries, parental leave has more restrictive requirements than maternity leave or paternity leave. Research by Marynissen, Wood and Neels (2021) found that 26.37% of mothers in Belgium are not eligible for parental leave. This is due to the employment-based eligibility criteria present with the country's parental leave program (although unemployed women receive maternity leave). By using an employment-based measure, scholars have noted that this creates barriers for currently unemployed mothers to receive an opportunity to take more time off looking for a job and care for their child. Another limitation present with employment-based criteria is that in some countries self-employed individuals are not eligible for certain parental benefits. For example, in Belgium, a self-employed woman receives a maternity leave that is shorter and lower paid than an employed woman; and does not receive parental leave. There are also a certain number of hours an employee must meet before being eligible for employment-based parental leave. These various factors limit access to parental care for expecting mothers. Expecting parents who are the most affected by these criteria are usually younger, single, less educated or from migrant backgrounds.

In addition to discrepancies present in eligibility, there is variation among expecting mothers who use parental leave benefits. For example, research performed by Kil, Wood and Neels(2018) found that native-born Belgian women had higher uptake of parental programs (52%) in comparison to first-generation Belgian citizens from Turkey and Morocco, whose uptake was relatively low (34%). The difference in uptake can be attributed to factors such as the flexibility of the parental leave, culture of the workplace, cultural ideals of paid leave, not knowing about the program itself and other normative factors that influenced the use of paid leave.

Research has found that mothers in same-sex relationships are less likely to uptake parental leave than mothers in different-sex relationships. Evertsson and Boye (2018) found that birth mothers in same-sex relationships, on average, took seven weeks less parental leave than birth mothers in different-sex relationships. The authors reference that gender norms result in the difference between parental uptake duration between birth mothers in same-sex relationships compared to different-sex relationships.

=== Eligibility of parental leave for same sex couples ===
Eligibility of parental leave for same sex couples depends on numerous factors: on adoption policies (on whether or not same-sex couples can adopt jointly or not; on whether a single parent is allowed to adopt or not – and if yes, whether the second parent can subsequently adopt – and on surrogacy laws). According to a study that examined policies in 34 OECD countries, in nineteen of these countries, same sex female couples received the same amount of parental leave benefits as different sex couples. For same-sex male couples, four countries provided the same duration of parental leave as different sex couples. Therefore, twenty-nine OECD countries provided a shorter period of parental leave and fewer benefits for same-sex male parents. In addition, some countries, such as Turkey and Israel, provided no parental leave benefits or paid leave for the expectant male parents.

The reason for discrepancies in parental leave between same-sex and different-sex couples is theorized to have several different explanations, usually related to who can be a legal parent. One factor affecting parental leave duration for same-sex couples is the restrictive language found in parental leave policies. The study found that some parental leave policies only referred to heterosexual couples and did not include same-sex couples in the legislation, leading to increased barriers for same-sex parents to receive paid leave. Another significant barrier comes when same-sex couples try adopting their child. In 15 of the 34 OECD countries examined, same sex couples cannot legally adopt a child together. In these countries, same-sex couples may have one person in the relationship adopt their child as a single parent. Only one parent will be provided parental or adoption-related leave through this adoption strategy. While there is an option of second-parent adoption in some of these 15 countries, the process of a second adoption is costly and time-consuming- creating potential barriers that restrict the same-sex couple from pursuing this procedure. In some countries, same-sex parents can only be formed through a birth mother in a lesbian relation (considered legally a single mother), so the second mother does not receive leave.

== Effects ==
Typically, the effects of parental leave are improvements in prenatal and postnatal care, including a decrease in infant mortality. The effects of parental leave on the labor market include an increase in employment, changes in wages, and fluctuations in the rate of employees returning to work. Leave legislation can also impact fertility rates.

=== On the labor market ===
A study in Germany found that wages decreased by 18 percent for every year an employee spends on parental leave. However, after the initial decrease in wages, the employee's salary rebounds faster than the salary of someone not offered parental leave. A study of California's leave policy, the first state in the U.S. to require employers to offer paid parental leave, showed that wages did increase.

Parental leave can lead to greater job security. Studies differ in how this helps return to work after taking time off. Some studies show that if a parent is gone for more than a year after the birth of a child, it decreases the possibility that he or she will return. Other studies of shorter leave periods show that parents no longer need to quit their jobs to care for their children, so employment return increases.

It does not appear that parental leave policies have had a significant effect on the gender wage gap, which has remained relatively steady since the late 1980s, despite increasing adoption of parental leave policies.

If women take long parental leaves, an economic model predicts that their lifetime earnings and opportunities for promotion will be less than their male or childless counterparts—the "motherhood penalty".

==== On workforce ====
Paid parental leave incentivizes labor market attachment for women both before and after birth, affecting the GDP and national productivity, as the workforce is larger. Parental leave increases income at the household level as well by supporting dual-earner families.

Paid parental leave incentivises childbirth, which affects the future workforce and pensions.

==== Statistical discrimination ====
In case of employer liability the parental leave costs incentivise statistical discrimination against hiring women of child-bearing years. To counteract this, the cost impact can be spread more evenly across the labor market, for instance through health insurance covering parental leave with contributions independent of gender and age.

==== Occupational sex segregation ====
Women may seek out employment sectors that are "family-friendly" (i.e., with generous parental leave policies), resulting in occupational sex segregation. Nielsen, Simonsen, and Verner examine what the different outcomes for women in Denmark are between the "family-friendly" and the "non-family-friendly" sector. In Denmark, the public sector is "family-friendly" because of its generous leave and employee benefits; workers decide which sector to work in based on their preferences and opportunities. The study found that, while in the "family-friendly" sector there was basically no wage loss related to taking parental leave, women did have consistent earnings loss in the "non-family-friendly" private sector for one year's leave.

=== Cost ===
Datta Gupta, Smith, & Verneer found in 2008 that parental leave is very expensive to fund and question if it is the most cost-effective use of funds.

=== On economy ===
The economic consequences of parental leave policies are subject to controversy. According to a 2016 study, the expansion of government-funded maternity leave in Norway from 18 to 35 weeks had net costs that amounted to 0.25% of GDP, negative redistribution properties and implied a considerable increase in taxes at a cost to economic efficiency. In the U.S., paid family leave tends to lead to a higher employee retention rate and higher incomes for families. Evidence from selected countries in Western Europe suggests that moderate levels of parental leave can encourage mothers to reenter the work force after having children, promoting national economic development.

=== Maternity leave and its effects ===
In the U.S., while the Family and Medical Leave Act of 1993 (FMLA) allows for unpaid parental leave, parents often do not use this eligibility to its fullest extent as it is unaffordable. As a result, some studies show that the FMLA has had a limited impact on how much leave new parents take. Though specific amounts can vary, having a child (including the cost of high-quality childcare) costs families approximately $11,000 in the first year. These high costs contribute to new mothers in the United States returning to work quicker than new mothers in European countries; approximately one third of women in the United States return to work within three months of giving birth, compared to approximately five per cent in the U.K., Germany, and Sweden, and just over half of mothers in the United States with a child under the age of one work.

There is some evidence that legislation for parental leave raises the likelihood of women returning to their previous jobs as opposed to finding a new job. This rise is thought to fall to between 10% and 17%. Simultaneously, there is a decrease in the percentage of women who find new jobs, which falls between 6% and 11%. Thus, such legislation appears to increase how many women return to work post-childbirth by around 3% or 4%.

Additionally, it appears that parental leave policies do allow women to stay home longer before returning to work as the probability of returning to an old job falls in the second month after childbirth before dramatically rising in the third month. Although this legislation thus appears to have minimal effect on women choosing to take leave, it does appear to increase the time women take in leave.

Maternity leave legislation could pose benefits or harm to employers. The main potential drawback of mandated leave is its potential to disrupt productive activities by raising rates of employee absenteeism. With mandated leave for a certain period of time and facing prolonged absence of the mothers in the workplace, firms will be faced with two options: hire a temp (which could involve training costs) or function with a missing employee. Alternatively, these policies could be positive for employers who previously did not offer leave because they were worried about attracting employees who were disproportionately likely to use maternity leave. Thus, there is potential for these policies to correct market failures. A drawback of rising leave at the societal level, however, is the resulting decrease in female labor supply. In countries with a high demand for labor, including many present-day countries with aging populations, a smaller labor supply is unfavorable.

Something important to note for all the research cited above is that the results typically depend on how leave coverage is defined, and whether the policies are for unpaid or paid leave. Policies guaranteeing paid leave are considered by some to be dramatically more effective than unpaid-leave policies.

For women individually, long breaks in employment, as would come from parental leave, negatively affects their careers. Longer gaps are associated with reduced lifetime earnings and lower pension disbursements as well as worsened career prospects and reduced earnings. Due to these drawbacks, some countries, notably Norway, have expanded family policy initiatives to increase the father's quota and expand childcare in an effort to work towards greater gender equality.

According to a 2016 study, the expansion of government-funded maternity leave in Norway from 18 to 35 weeks led mothers to spend more time at home without a reduction in family income.

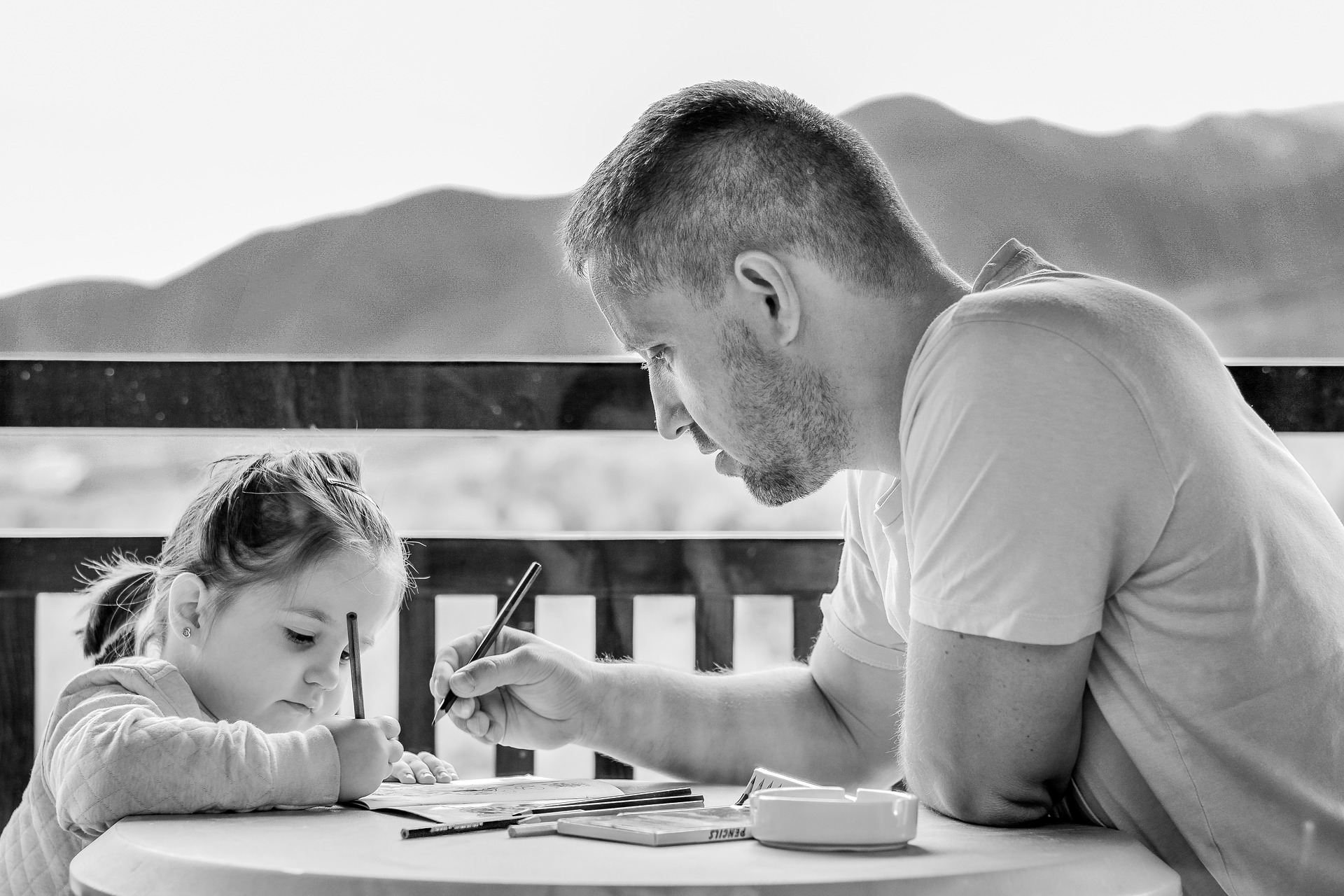
Father spending time with daughter

=== Paternity leave and its effects ===
The term 'paternity leave' refers to the leave that is exclusively granted to the fathers to enable them in spending time with their new-born child. Although parental leave is increasingly granted to fathers, mothers continue to take the majority of guaranteed parental leave. When guaranteed leave is unpaid, research indicates that men's leave usage is unaffected. In Germany, where parental leave is guaranteed for both parents, the financial incentive, alone, was not enough to encourage fathers to take paternal leave. While uncommon on a world scale, some countries do reserve parts of the paid leave for the father, meaning it can't be transferred to the mother and lapses unless he uses it. Among the earliest countries to actively push for increased usage of paternity leave are the Nordic welfare states, starting with Sweden making parental leave gender neutral in 1974 and soon followed by Iceland, Denmark, Norway and Finland. These countries lack a unified concept of paternity leave, each imposing different conditions, ratios and timescales, but are regarded as among the most generous in the world.

Partly in an initiative to combat the "motherhood penalty", Norway in 1993 initiated a policy change to incentivize paternal leave, the so-called "father's quota", and Sweden followed suit in 1995. This means a certain number of parental leave-days can only be used by the father, and are otherwise lost. In countries in which leave entitlements include a father's quota, there has been a pronounced impact, with the quota being credited for increasing paternal involvement and challenging gender roles within the family, promoting a more equal division of labor. To evaluate this change, Rønsen and Kitterød looked at the rate and timing of women's return to work after giving birth, and the effect on this of the new parental leave policy. In their 2015 study, Rønsen and Kitterød found women in Norway returned to work significantly faster after the policy change. However, public or subsidized daycare was greatly expanded at the same time, so Rønsen and Kitterød did not find that the "father's quota" was solely responsible for the timing of work entry. But it can be understood to have an effect on division of household labor by gender when both parents can take time to care for a new baby.

Another impact from fathers taking more leave is that in Norway it has been shown to have the potential to either decrease or increase the time women take, depending on whether the mother's and father's childcare are seen as substitutes or complements. If substitute goods, mothers are able to return to work sooner as fathers take some of the childcare responsibility. Research has suggested a class element is at play: middle class fathers consider themselves a suitable alternative to the mother as primary caregiver, while working-class men may see themselves more as supporters of their partner during her leave. Consequently, middle class fathers may be more likely to use their allotment of leave right after the mother returns to work, while working class fathers may opt to take their leave during the mother's leave. In some cases, longer leave for fathers can motivate mothers to also stay home.

Fathers tend to use less parental leave than mothers in the United States as well as in other countries where paid leave is available, and this difference may have factors other than the financial constraints which impact both parents. Bygren and Duvander, looking at the use of parental leave by fathers in Sweden, concluded that fathers' workplace characteristics (including the size of the workplace, whether there were more men or women in the workplace, and whether the workplace was part of the private or public sector) influenced the length of parental leave for fathers, as did the presence of other men who had taken parental leave at an earlier point in time. As of 2016 paternity leave accounts for 25% of paid parental leave in Sweden.

A 2023 study found that paternity leave causes attitudinal change on gender issues. When paternity leave is made available to fathers, parents increasingly support gender-egalitarian socioeconomic policies and women's rights issues.

==== Criticism of the 'father quota' ====
The father's quota is a policy implemented by some countries or companies that reserves a part of the parental leave or other types of family leave for the father. If the father does not take this reserved part of leave, the family loses that leave period—that is, it cannot be transferred to the mother. Given the high rates of women's participation in the formal labor force in many parts of the world, there is increasing interest among social scientists and policymakers in supporting a more equal division of labor between partners. Some critics question whether such policies are evidence-based and express concern that they are "a social experiment, the effects of which are unknown". However, other studies have shown that paternity leave improves bonds between fathers and children and also helps mitigate the wage gap women face after taking maternity leave. Other psychological perspectives summarise evidence and find that the role of a father in child development is very similar to that of a mother, counteracting the concern that greater paternal involvement in childcare could lead to unforeseen negative consequences. Criticism is often less concerned about the idea of paternity leave itself, but condemns the fact that father's quota policies do not allow that time to be allocated to the mother instead. Critics argue that the quota harms mothers, depriving them of much needed leave, trivializes biological realities, and is an example of discrimination against mothers.

In the European Union, non-transferable parental leave remains a controversial issue. It was first introduced by the Parental Leave Directive 2010, which required at least one month of the minimum four months of parental leave be non-nontransferable; this non-transferable period was increased to two months by the Work–Life Balance Directive of 2019, which must be transposed by member states at the latest on 2 August 2022. Originally, the plan under the Work–Life Balance Directive was to increase the non-transferable period to four months, but due to inability to reach consensus among member states, a compromise was reached at two months. (note: this refers to the specific type of leave called parental leave, under EU law there are different types of leave, such as maternity leave, paternity leave, parental leave, and carer leave which are regulated differently).

=== Length of leave ===
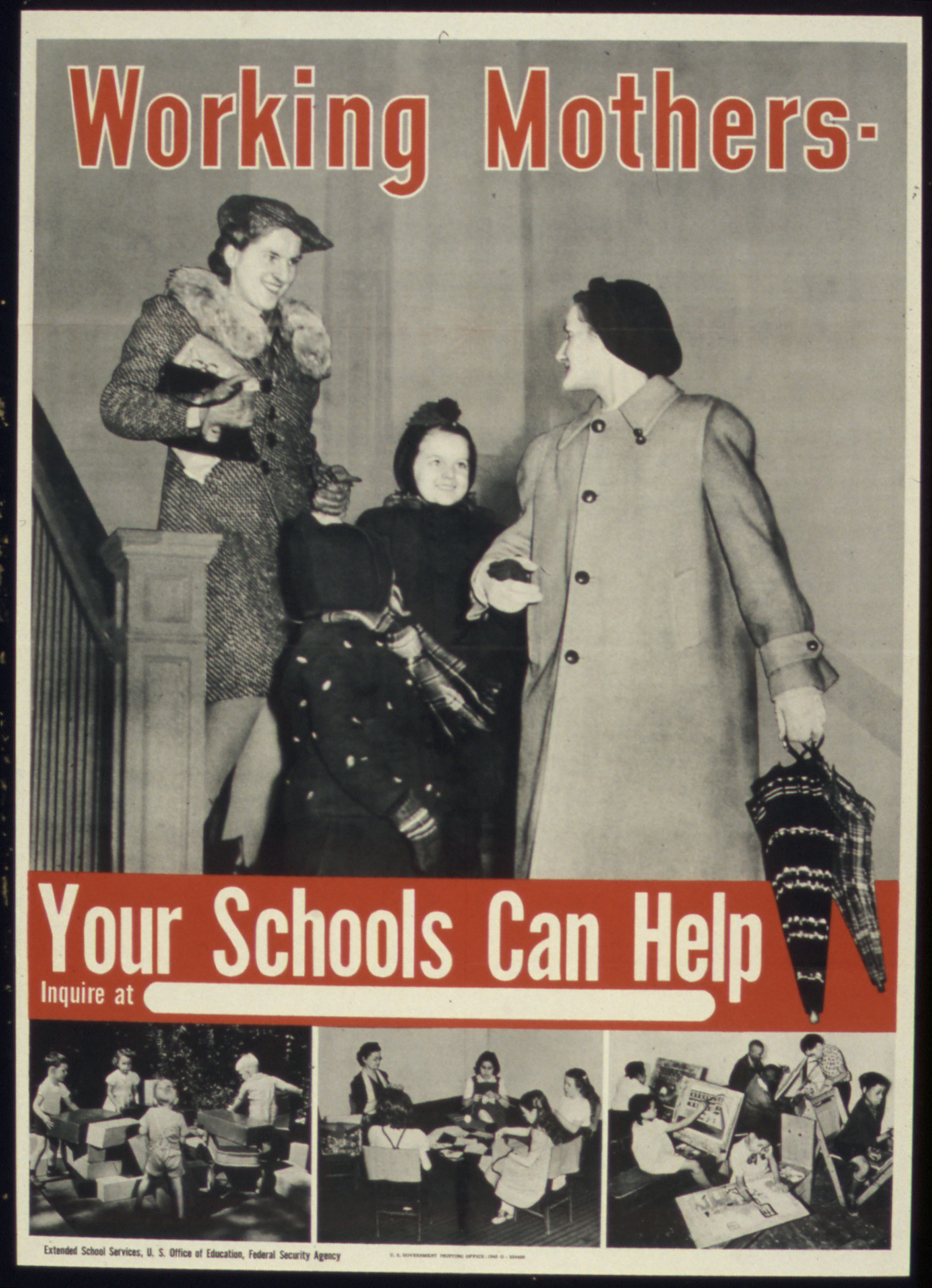
Family policy during World War II when women were recruited into the workplace

In 2013, Joseph, Pailhé, Recotillet, and Solaz published a natural experiment evaluating a 2004 policy change in France. They were interested in the economic effects of full-time, short paid parental leave. Before the reform, women had a mandatory two-month parental leave, and could take up to three years' unpaid parental leave with their job guaranteed, though most women only took the two months. The new policy, complément libre choix d'activité (CLCA), guarantees six months of paid parental leave. The authors found positive effects on employment: compared to women in otherwise similar circumstances before the reform, first-time mothers who took the paid leave after the reform were more likely to be employed after their leave, and less likely to stay out of the labor force. The authors point to similar results of full-time, short paid parental leave observed in Canada in 2008 by Baker and Milligan, and in Germany in 2009 by Kluve and Tamm. However, Joseph et al. also found that wages were lower (relative to women before the reform) for moderately and highly educated women after the leave, which could be because the women returned to work part-time or because of a "motherhood penalty", where employers discriminate against mothers, taking the six-month leave as a "signal" that the woman will not be as good of an employee because of her mothering responsibilities.

Rasmussen analyzed a similar natural experiment in Denmark with a policy change in 1984 where parental leave increased from 14 to 20 weeks. Rasmussen found the increased length of parental leave had no negative effect on women's wages or employment and in the short run (i.e., 12 months) it had a positive effect on women's wages, compared to the shorter leave. There was no difference on children's long-term educational outcomes before and after the policy change.

=== On health and development ===
According to a 2020 study, parental leave leads to better health outcomes for children. A Harvard report cited research showing paid maternity leave "facilitates breastfeeding and reduces risk of infection" but is not associated with changes in immunization rate. This research also found that countries with parental leave had lower infant mortality rates. Returning to work within 12 weeks was also associated with fewer regular medical checkups. Data from 16 European countries during the period 1969–1994 revealed that the decrease of infant mortality rates varied based on length of leave. A 10-week leave was associated with a 1–2% decrease; a 20-week leave with 2–4%; and 30 weeks with 7–9%. The United States, which does not have a paid parental leave law, ranked 56th in the world in 2014 in terms of infant mortality rates, with 6.17 deaths per every 1,000 children born. The research did not find any infant health benefits in countries with unpaid parental leave. Paid leave, particularly when available prior to childbirth, had a significant effect on birth weight. The frequency of low birth rate decreases under these policies, which likely contributes to the decrease in infant mortality rates as low birth weight is strongly correlated with infant death. However, careful analysis reveals that increased birth weight is not the sole reason for the decreased mortality rate.

A 2021 study found that the introduction of paid maternity leave in Norway substantially improved maternal health outcomes, in particular for first-time and low-income mothers.

According to a 2016 study, the expansion of government-funded maternity leave in Norway from 18 to 35 weeks had little effect on children's schooling. However, when infants bond and have their needs met quickly by caregivers (mothers, fathers, etc.) they will become confident and be prepared to have healthy relationships throughout their life.

Children whose mothers worked in the first 9 months were found to be less ready for school at the age of 3 years. The effects of mothers' employment appeared to be the most detrimental when employment started between the sixth and ninth month of life. The reasons for this were uncertain, but there is conjecture that there was something unusual for the group of mothers who returned to work in this time period as they represented only 5% of all families studied. Negative impacts in terms of school-readiness were most pronounced when the mother worked at least 30 hours per week. These findings were complicated by many factors, including race, poverty, and how sensitive the mother was considered. The effects were also greater in boys, which is explained by the fact that many analysts consider boys more vulnerable to stress in early life.

The same Harvard report also linked paid parental leave and a child's psychological health. It found that parents with paid parental leave had closer bonds with their children. Based on research of heterosexual couples, better immersion of the father in the process of raising a child can lead to improved development outcomes for the child and a better relationship between the parents. In recent years, various OECD countries drew attention to the topic, especially to the time of the parental leave taken by fathers, and concluded that short-term paternal leaves still lead to positive outcomes for the child's development. Families do take into account relative income levels of each parent when planning for parental leave; the partner earning a lower wage may be more likely to take parental leave. There is also often workplace pressure on men not to take paternity leave, or to take less than the maximum time allowed. To counteract these pressures and encourage paternity leave, some countries have experimented with making paternity leave mandatory or otherwise incentivizing it.

There are also observable improvements in the mental health of mothers when they are able to return to work later. While the probability of experiencing postpartum depression had no significant statistical change, longer leave (leave over 10 weeks) was associated with decreased severity of depression and decreased number of experienced symptoms. This reduction was, on average, between 5% and 10%.

Studies looking for a connection between paid parental leave have shown conflicting results. Some research looked at women 25–34 years old, who are more likely to be affected by leave legislation. Fertility rates peaked for those between 25–29 and 30–34 across European countries. Conversely, however, research in Spain found that after the introduction of two weeks of paid paternity leave, fertility rates fell suggesting that, when fathers are more engaged in raising children, they may become more aware of the challenges; their priorities may shift to quality over quantity of children; or that mothers are better able to remain connected to the workforce.

A study of a 2012 law in Sweden that allowed fathers to take up to 30 days of paid family leave in the first year after the birth of the child at the same time as the mother was on leave led to substantial improvements in the mental and physical health of mothers.

=== On freedoms and opportunities ===
According Amartya Sen and Martha Nussbaum universal, paid parental leave enables the freedom and opportunity of starting a family while also working.

=== On gender equality ===
Symbol for gender equality

Parental leave policies have an impact on gender equality as it relates to parenting and are therefore used by various countries as a tool to promote gender equality. Many countries have implemented paid parental leave policies for both parents, while a minority of countries, like the United States, only have unpaid parental leave. A father's quota, which reserves a part of the leave period exclusively for the father, is sometimes assumed to promote gender equality, although the extent and effects are subject to debate.

As more women have joined the formal labor force, the lack of men's participation in parenting has been called out as a key example of gender inequality. Various studies highlight the importance of egalitarian parental leave policies in achieving equal distribution of childcare between parents. Moreover, when discussing parental leave policies, the focus is often on comparing improvements in maternity leave policies to what was available in the past, rather than comparing the impact of diverse policies around the world that distribute parental leave differently between both parents.

Statistics show a positive correlation between maternity leave policies and women's employment, but the causation relationship cannot be firmly established. While many believe that maternity leave policies encourage women's participation in the labor force, Anita Nyberg suggests that it is the other way around: that development of maternity leave policies was a response to women's participation in the labor force.

Economist Christopher Ruhm argues that men's involvement in childcare at the same level as women is essential for eliminating differences in gender roles. Thus, an increase in the use of parental leave by women (and lack thereof by men) will have a negative impact on gender equality. Inversely, an increase in the use of leave by men will have a positive impact. Transferable leave policies appear to be fair and equal in theory, since they do not specifically allocate leave focused on childcare to women and even allow the family to choose. In practice, however, it leads to the majority of available parental leave being used by women. The Norwegian Association for Women's Rights, summarizing different studies, states that there is only limited evidence to support a relationship between the father's quota and gender equality; the few relevant studies point in different directions; the association's former president, psychologist and former chairman of UNICEF Torild Skard, argues that psychological research does not support the assertion that mothers can be replaced by fathers in the first year. A Norwegian study from 2018 found that an extension of the father's quota had no effect on gender equality.

Through examination of leave policies in twenty-one European countries by describing the existing policy schemes' duration, payment, and transferability, Carmen Castro-Garcia created the Parental Leave Equality Index (PLEI), which can predict the participation of each parent in raising their children based on their gender and the existing policy regarding parental leave. His model shows that a policy that provides equal, nontransferable, and well-paid leave for each parent (which no country has at the moment) will best encourage men's and women's equal participation in childcare.

==== European Union ====
The European Union recognizes the ability for countries to use varying parental leave policies to affect labor force participation, the labor market, maternal health, the work–life balance of parents, and the physical and emotional development of children. And by affecting the work–life balance of parents, it may reduce the barriers to participation of both parents in parenting. More specifically, paternity and parental leave policies are key to encouraging fathers' involvement in parenting the child.

European Union flag

In 2014, the European Parliament concluded that, by promoting the uptake of parental leave and paternity leave by fathers, governments can aim to facilitate a more gender-equal distribution of care work, support mothers' return to the labor market, equalize the circumstances in which women and men enter the labor market, and improve the work–life balance of families.

Findings by the European Parliament in 2015 found that 18 of the EU-28 countries offer paternity leave, and that the EU-average length is 12.5 days, ranging from one day in Italy to 64 working days in Slovenia. For 23 EU member states, on average only 10 percent of fathers take parental leave, ranging from 0.02 percent in Greece to 44 per cent in Sweden.

The gender difference in the employment rate is representative of the gender employment gap; filling this gap is an important objective in promoting gender equality and is a part of the Europe 2020 target of an employment rate of 75 per cent for both men and women. The uptake of leave by fathers can reduce the motherhood penalty by enabling mothers to return to the labor market, as illustrated by studies that have shown that the involvement of fathers in childcare has a positive effect on mothers' full-time employment.

Reduction of the gender pay gap (GPG) is also an important goal for the EU. In 2014 the GPG in the EU-28 was 16.1 percent, which means that for every euro men got paid in the EU, women got paid 83.9 cents. (The GPG exists equally after correction for occupation and education level.) A study done on the gender pension gap estimates the gap to be around 40 percent, which is more than twice the gender pay gap. Increased leave uptake by fathers can reduce the length of career interruptions for women, reduce part-time work by women and potentially reduce the GPG, all of which are leading causes of the gender pension gap.

==== Nordic countries ====
The advancement of gender equality has also been on the political agenda of Nordic countries for decades. Although all Nordic countries have extended the total leave period, their policies towards father's quota are different.

In Iceland, each parent receives paid leaves, and each parent can transfer a month to the other (therefore there are two transferable months between the parents). In Sweden, 90 days cannot be transferred from one parent to the other—i.e. each parent gets at least 90 days of parental leave, thus the quota applies equally to both parents and is not specifically fathers. In total, Sweden offers new parents 480 days of parental leave and these days can be used up until the child is 12 years old. The only Nordic country that does not provide fathers with a quota is Denmark, where women have the right to four weeks parent leave before giving birth and 14 weeks leave after giving birth. Thereafter, 32 weeks of parent leave are voluntarily divided between the man and the woman, making eight months leave entirely up to the family to decide. However, the dual earner/dual care model seems to be the direction of all the Nordic countries are moving in the construction of their parental leave systems.

A study done in Norway found that when parental leave is granted for both parents, there is still gender inequality observed in the form of mothers being more likely to have part-time jobs compared to their partners. Since then, the government has provided child care support for parents who want them to encourage mothers to return to full-time jobs earlier, and it is effective to a certain extent.

==== Germany ====
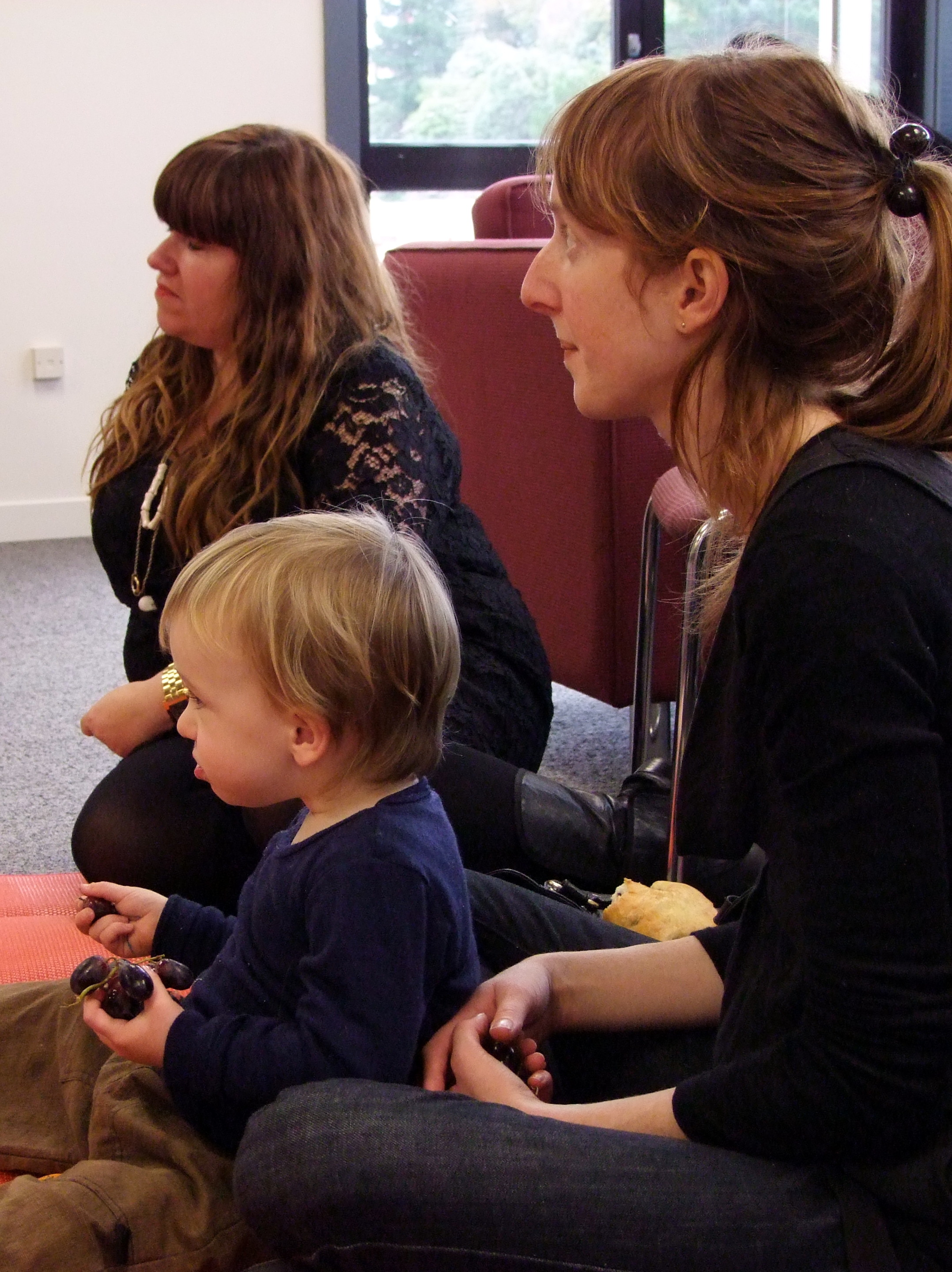
Mother spending time with her child

In Germany, original laws tackling gender inequality with respect to parenting date back to 1986 in both Eastern and Western Germany, where one parent could take up to two years of leave after the birth of the child with a maximum allowance. According to a study done in 2006, 97% of the people who took the leave were mothers.

In 2007, declining birth rates and demographic change led to a new law, the "Parenting Benefits and Parental Leave Law" (Bundeselterngeld- und Elternzeit-Gesetz). This change in family policy had mainly two aims: to reduce parents' financial loss in the first year after childbirth, and to encourage fathers to actively participate in childcare by taking parental leave.

With this shift in paradigm, a better work–life balance and less support for the male breadwinner model was targeted. This was part of a "sustainable family policy" promoted by German unification and European integration with the underlying objective to raise birth rates by providing financial incentive.

The law's impact was mainly perceived positively with men reporting high motivation to take leave. So far this has not been reflected in official statistics, but Susanne Vogl concludes that if there is a general willingness of men to participate in parental leave the new Parenting Benefits regulations will help facilitate the actual decision to take a leave.

==== United States ====
Even though, according to a survey conducted by WorldatWork and Mercer in 2017, 93% of Americans agree that mothers should receive paid parental leave and 85% agree that fathers should receive paid parental leave, as of October 2018 the United States does not have nationwide laws that guarantee paid parental leave to its workforce; however, certain states have passed laws providing paid workers with such rights. As of April 2022, ten states (California, New Jersey, Rhode Island, New York, Washington, Massachusetts, Connecticut, Oregon, Colorado, and Maryland) and the District of Columbia have enacted laws that grant parental leave as part of state paid family and medical leave insurance laws, with 4 being effective currently. In states without such laws, a proportion of companies do provide paid parental leave.

According to Eileen Appelbaum, the lack of parental leave policies results in many low-income families struggling to support themselves financially if both parents are off work. As a result, many mothers leave work to take care of their children while the father remains at work to financially support the family.

The group of mothers that uses maternity leave most often in the United States are White, non-Hispanic women and the usage of paid maternity leave is drastically lower among Black and Hispanic mothers. The groups of women that have the most access and opportunity to use maternity leave are often reported as having a higher level of income and full-time employment. Statistically, Black women are half as likely to take leave as compared to White women. Black people are substantially less likely to take maternity or parental leave, which is due to structural factors including racial and ethnic discrimination in the workforce. Black women have less access to resources that allow them to take leave or provide care for family members, and Hispanic women are faced with the same issues. These disadvantages lead to lower socioeconomic statuses of Black and Hispanic people in the United States, which also contribute to a lack of opportunity for paid maternity leave and a lack of the financial resources needed to be able to afford taking unpaid or partially paid parental leave. Black and Hispanic workers are less likely to work in professional-class jobs, and therefore are less likely to have access to benefits like paid leave that come with such jobs. Black parents are frequently employed in the public sector, which also may exclude them from paid family leave opportunities. When a lack of access to paid or unpaid maternity or parental leave is reported, Black and Hispanic women are more likely to have higher risks of maternal and child health problems. Non-Hispanic Black women are more likely to die from complications of pregnancy than Non-Hispanic White women in the United States.

For most federal civilian employees, the Federal Employee Paid Leave Act allows up to 12 weeks of qualifying unpaid Family and Medical Leave Act leave to be replaced with paid parental leave following a birth, adoption, or foster placement. A 2024 Government Accountability Office review found that 96 percent of respondents to the 2022 Federal Employee Viewpoint Survey who reported using the benefit used it for a birth, while 2 percent each used it for an adoption or foster placement.

==== Australia ====
The Australian government provides paid parental leave (PPL) for both parents, but more for the mother compared to the father. Michael Bittman stated that the reason they provide parental leave is unique in that they view children as "public goods" and, therefore, the state is responsible to provide and support the child. But like most places around the world, studies done in Australia show that the inequality still persists within the family, and that women spend more time doing unpaid work (like parenting) compared to men.

==== China ====
According to a study done by Nan Jia, during the Maoist era, women's full participation in the labor force played a key role in the Chinese government's efforts to advance women's position in society. To facilitate women's labor force participation, the Chinese government initiated a series of measures to mitigate the work–family conflict that women face during pregnancy and childbirth. These measures included an entitlement to 56 days of paid maternity leave.

In the post-reform era, a series of new regulations have been introduced to protect women's employment and reproductive rights in the new market economy. The Labor Law adopted in 1995 ensured that women and men have equal employment rights and that employers will not lay off women employees or lower their wages for reasons of marriage, pregnancy, maternity leave, or breastfeeding. The Labor Contract Law enacted in 2008 introduced the provision that prohibits employers from unilaterally terminating labor contracts with women employees who are pregnant, give birth, and care for a baby postpartum. Thus, under the Labor Law and Labor Contract Law, women employees are entitled to job-protected maternity leave.

The post-reform era saw further improvements in maternity benefits. The length of paid maternity leave was extended from 56 days prior to reform, to 90 days in 1988, and to 98 days in 2012. Most recently in 2016, paid maternity leave was extended to a minimum of 128 days after the long-standing one-child policy was replaced with a policy that encourages each couple to have two children. This latest extension of paid leave aims to increase fertility rates and slow the population aging process.

=== On relationships ===
A 2020 study in the Economic Journal found that reforms in Iceland that incentivized fathers to take parental leave reduced the likelihood of parents separating. The strongest impact was on relationships where the mother was more educated than or equally educated as the father.

== Private parental leave ==
Some businesses adopt policies that are favorable to workers and public opinion. In their study of maternity leave policies in the United States, Kelly and Dobbin found that public policy surrounding pregnancy as a temporary disability (for instance, California's Family Temporary Disability Insurance program) gave rise to business practices that included maternity leave as a benefit.

Companies are starting to offer paid parental leave as a benefit to some American workers, seeing a profitable aspect of doing so, including: reduced turnover costs, increased productivity from workers, and increased rates of retention among women after childbirth. Some see the increase in paid parental leave as indicative of companies reaching out to women, as more women are working and returning to work after having children, and by doing so these companies generate positive publicity as employers with family-friendly workplaces. Working Mother magazine publishes a list of the 100 Best Companies for working mothers each year, a list which is noted not only by the readership of the magazine, but also by corporate America and increasingly by researchers and policy institutes as well. The Institute for Women's Policy Research issued a report in 2009 encouraging Congress to give federal workers four weeks of paid parental leave. The report cited statistics from the Working Mother 100 Best Company list, using private sector corporations as examples of substantial increase in the retention of new mothers after instituting a longer maternity leave policy. The report also noted that it would take newer workers four years to accrue enough paid leave (sick leave and annual leave) to equal the 12 weeks of unpaid parental leave provided under the FMLA, and that private sector companies that offer paid parental leave have a significant advantage over the federal government in the recruitment and retention of younger workers who may wish to have children.

As of February 2018, multinational companies such as Deloitte, TIAA and Cisco were providing parental leave regardless of the parent's gender.

== Comparison between countries ==
Comparisons between countries in terms of employee benefits to leave for parents are often attempted, but they are very difficult to make because of the complexity of types of leave available and because terms such as maternity leave, paternity leave, pre-natal leave, post-natal leave, parental leave, family leave and home-care leave have different meanings in different jurisdictions. Such terms may often be used incorrectly. Comparing the length of maternity leave (which is common in international rankings) may say very little about the situation of a family in a specific country. A country for example may have a long maternity leave but a short (or non-existent) parental or family leave, or vice versa. In the European Union, each country has its own policies, which vary significantly, but all the EU members must abide by the minimum standards of the Pregnant Workers Directive and Work–Life Balance Directive.

Sometimes there is a distortion in how maternity leave is reported and delimitated from other types of leave, especially in jurisdictions where there is no clear legal term of "maternity leave", and such term is used informally to denote either the minimum or the maximum period of parental leave reserved by quota to the mother. Some countries may be listed artificially as having more or less generous benefits. Sweden is sometimes listed in international statistics as having 480 days' "maternity leave", although these days include parental leave. As such, Sweden is often quoted as having an exceptionally long leave, although there are several countries with significantly longer leave, when maternity leave and other leaves are added, where a parent may take leave until a child is 3 years of age.

The Convention on the Elimination of All Forms of Discrimination against Women introduces "maternity leave with pay or with comparable social benefits without loss of former employment, seniority or social allowances". The Maternity Protection Convention C 183 adopted in 2000 by International Labour Organization requires 14 weeks of maternity leave as minimum condition.

National laws vary widely according to the politics of each jurisdiction. As of 2013, among the countries for which data was available, only Papua New Guinea and the United States did not have a general legal provision for paid parental leave.

Unless otherwise specified, the information in the tables below is gathered from the most recent International Labour Organization reports. Maternity leave refers to the legal protection given to the mother immediately after she gives birth (but may also include a period before the birth), paternity leave to legal protection given to the father immediately after the mother gives birth, and parental leave to protected time for childcare (usually for either parent) either after the maternity/paternity leave or immediately after birth (for example when the parent is not eligible for paternal leave or where the time is calculated until the child is a specific age—therefore excluding parental leave—usually such jurisdictions protect the job until the child reaches a specific age). Others allow the parental leave to be transferred into part-time work time. Parental leave is generally available to either parent, except where specified. Leave marked "Unpaid" indicates the job is protected for the duration of the leave. Different countries have different rules regarding eligibility for leave and how long a parent has to have worked at their place of employment prior to giving birth before they are eligible for paid leave. In the European Union, the policies vary significantly by country—with regard to length, to payment, and to how parental leave relates to prior maternity leave—but the EU members must abide by the minimum standards of the Pregnant Workers Directive and Parental Leave Directive.

=== International minimum standards ===
The Maternity Protection Convention, 2000 requires at least 14 weeks of maternity leave. In the European Union, the Pregnant Workers Directive requires at least 14 weeks of maternity leave; while the Work–Life Balance Directive requires at least 10 days of paternity leave, as well as at least 4 months of parental leave, with 2 months being non-transferable.

=== Africa ===
Country	Maternity leave		Paternity leave		Parental (Note: Either parent) leave		Source of payment
Country	Length (weeks)	Pay	Length (weeks)	Pay	Length (weeks)	Pay	Source of payment
Algeria	14	100%	<1	100%	0	—N/a	Mixed (Social security maternity leave; employer liability paternity leave)
Angola	13	100%	0	—N/a	0	—N/a	Social security
Benin	14	100%	2	100%	0	—N/a	Mixed (maternity: 50% social insurance; 50% employer. Paternity: 100% employer)
Botswana	12	50%	0	—N/a	0	—N/a	Employer liability
Burkina Faso	14	100%	2	100%	52	Unpaid	Mixed (Social security maternity leave; employer liability paternity leave)
Burundi	12	100%	2+	50%	0	—N/a	Mixed (maternity: 50% social insurance; 50% employer. Paternity: 100% employer)
Cameroon	14	100%	2	100%	0	—N/a	Mixed (Social security maternity leave; employer liability paternity leave)
Cape Verde	9	90%	0	—N/a	0	—N/a	Social security
Central African Republic	14	50%	2	100%	0	—N/a	Mixed (Social security maternity leave; employer liability paternity leave)
Chad	14	100%	2	100%	52	Unpaid	Mixed (Social security maternity leave; employer liability paternity leave)
Comoros	14	100%	2	100%	0	—N/a	Employer liability
Congo	15	100%	2	100%	0	—N/a	Mixed (maternity: 50% social insurance; 50% employer. Paternity: 100% employer)
Côte d'Ivoire	14	100%	2	100%	0	—N/a	Mixed (Social security maternity leave; employer liability paternity leave)
Democratic Republic of the Congo	14	67%	<1	100%	0	—N/a	Employer liability
Djibouti	14	100%	<1	100%	0	—N/a	Mixed (maternity: 50% social insurance; 50% employer. Paternity: 100% employer)
Egypt	13	100%	0	—N/a	104 (only mothers)	Unpaid	Mixed (75% social security; 25% employer liability)
Equatorial Guinea	12	75%	0	—N/a	0	—N/a	Social security
Eritrea	9		0	—N/a	0	—N/a	Employer liability
Ethiopia	17	100%	1	Unpaid	0	—N/a	Employer liability
Gabon	14	100%	2	100%	0	—N/a	Mixed (Social security maternity leave; employer liability paternity leave)
Gambia	12	100%	0	—N/a	0	—N/a	Employer liability
Ghana	12	100%	0	—N/a	0	—N/a	Employer liability
Guinea	14	100%	0	—N/a	38 (only mothers)	Unpaid	Mixed (50% social insurance; 50% employer)
Guinea-Bissau	9	100%	0	—N/a	0	—N/a	Mixed (social security flat rate, employer pays the difference to equal wage)
Kenya	13	100%	2	100%	0	—N/a	Employer liability
Lesotho	12	100%	0	—N/a	0	—N/a	Employer liability
Libya	14	50% (100% for self-employed women)	<1		0	—N/a	Employer (social security for self-employed)
Madagascar	14	100%	2	100%	0	—N/a	Mixed (maternity: 50% social insurance; 50% employer. Paternity: 100% employer)
Malawi	8	100%	0	—N/a	0	—N/a	Employer liability
Mali	14	100%	<1	100%	0	—N/a	Social security
Mauritania	14	100%	2	100%	0	—N/a	Mixed (Social security maternity leave; employer liability paternity leave)
Mauritius	12	100%	1	100%	0	—N/a	Employer liability
Morocco	14	100%	<1	100%	52 (only mothers)	Unpaid	Social security
Mozambique	9	100%	<1	100%	0	—N/a	Mixed (Social security maternity leave; employer liability paternity leave)
Namibia	12	100%, with a maximum	0	—N/a	0	—N/a	Social security
Niger	14	100%	0	—N/a	0	—N/a	Mixed (50% social insurance; 50% employer)
Nigeria	12	50%	0	—N/a	0	—N/a	Employer liability
Rwanda	12	100% for 6 weeks; 20% remainder	<1	100%	0	—N/a	Employer liability
São Tomé and Príncipe	9	100%	0	—N/a	0	—N/a	Social security
Senegal	14	100%	0	—N/a	0	—N/a	Social security
Seychelles	14	Flat rate for 12 weeks; unpaid remainder	<1	100%	0	—N/a	Mixed (Social security maternity leave; employer liability paternity leave)
Sierra Leone	12	100%					Employer liability
Somalia	14	50%	0	—N/a	0	—N/a	Employer liability
South Africa	17	60%	2	66%	10 or 2 (Note: In the case of adoption and surrogacy: 10 weeks for one parent (termed parental adoption or commissioning parental leave) and 10 days for the other parent (parental leave))	66%	Social security
Sudan	8	100%	0	—N/a	0	—N/a	Employer liability
Eswatini	12	100% for 2 weeks; unpaid remainder	0	—N/a	0	—N/a	Employer liability
Tanzania	12	100%	<1	100%	0	—N/a	Mixed (Social security maternity leave; employer liability paternity leave)
Togo	14	100%	2	100%	0	—N/a	Mixed (maternity: 50% social insurance; 50% employer. Paternity: 100% employer)
Tunisia	4	66.70%	<1	100%	0	—N/a	Social security
Uganda	10	100%	<1	100%	0	—N/a	Employer liability
Zambia	14	100%	5 days		0	—N/a	Employer liability
Zimbabwe	14	100%	0	—N/a	0	—N/a	Employer liability

=== Americas ===
Country		Maternity leave		Paternity leave		Parental (Note: Either parent) leave		Source of payment
Country		Length (weeks)	Pay	Length (weeks)	Pay	Length (weeks)	Pay	Source of payment
Antigua and Barbuda		13	100% for 6 weeks; 60% for 7 weeks	0	—N/a	0	—N/a	Mixed (60% social security all 13 weeks plus 40% from employer for first 6 weeks)
Argentina		13	100%	<1	100%	0	—N/a	Mixed (Social security maternity leave; employer liability paternity leave)
Bahamas		13	100% for 12 weeks; 66.7% for 1 week	<1	Unpaid	0	—N/a	Mixed (2/3 social security for 13 weeks; 1/3 employer for 12 weeks)
Barbados		14 (Single births); 17 (Multiple births)	100%	3	100%	0	—N/a	Social security
Belize		14	100%	0	—N/a	0	—N/a	Social security
Bolivia		13	95%	0	—N/a	0	—N/a	Social security
Brazil		17	100%	<1 to 4	100%	7–30 days	—N/a	Mixed (Social security maternity leave; employer liability paternity leave)
British Virgin Islands		13	67%					Social security
Canada, except Quebec		15	55% (up to max. of $29,205 p.a.); for low-income families, up to 80%	0	N/A	Standard option: 35	Standard option: 55% (up to max. of $29,205 p.a.)	Social security
Canada, except Quebec		15	55% (up to max. of $29,205 p.a.); for low-income families, up to 80%	0	N/A	Extended option: 61	Extended option: 33% (up to max. of $17,523 p.a.)	Social security
Quebec, Canada	Opt. 1	18	70% (up to maximum $975 per week)	5	70% (up to maximum $975 per week)	32	7 weeks at 70% (up to maximum $975 per week) + 25 weeks at 55% (up to maximum $767 per week)	Social security
Quebec, Canada	Opt. 2	15	75% (up to maximum $1046 per week)	3	75% (up to maximum $1046 per week)	32	75% (up to maximum $1024 per week)	Social security
Chile		24	100%, with a maximum	1	100%	12 (6 only for mothers)	100%, with a maximum	Social security
Colombia		14	100%	1+	100%	0	—N/a	Social security
Costa Rica		17	100%	0	—N/a	0	—N/a	Mixed (50% social security, 50% employer)
Cuba		18	100%	0	—N/a	39	60%	Social security
Dominica		12	60%	0	—N/a	0	—N/a	Social security
Dominican Republic		12	100%	<1	100%	0	—N/a	Mixed (maternity: 50% social security, 50% employer; paternity: employer liability)
Ecuador		12	100%	2	100%	0	—N/a	Mixed (maternity: 75% social security, 25% employer; paternity: employer liability)
El Salvador		12	75%	<1	100%	0	—N/a	Mixed (Social security maternity leave; employer liability paternity leave)
Grenada		13	100% for 8 weeks; 65% for remainder	0	—N/a	0	—N/a	Mixed (65% social security all 13 weeks plus 35% from employer for first 8 weeks)
Guatemala		12	100%	<1	100%	0	—N/a	Mixed (maternity: 2/3 social security, 1/3 employer; paternity: employer)
Guyana		13	70%	0	—N/a	0	—N/a	Social security
Haiti		12	100% for 6 weeks; unpaid remainder	0	—N/a	0	—N/a	Employer liability
Honduras		12	100% for 10 weeks; unpaid remainder	0	—N/a	0	—N/a	Mixed (2/3 social security, 1/3 employer)
Jamaica		12	100% for 8 weeks; unpaid remainder	0	—N/a	0	—N/a	Employer liability
Mexico		12	100%	1	100%	0	—N/a	Social security
Nicaragua		12	100%	0	—N/a	0	—N/a	Mixed (60% social security, 40% employer)
Panama		14	100%	0	—N/a	0	—N/a	Social security
Paraguay		12	50% for 9 weeks; unpaid remainder	<1	100%	0	—N/a	Mixed (Social security maternity leave; employer liability paternity leave)
Peru		13	100%	<1	100%	0	—N/a	Mixed (Social security maternity leave; employer liability paternity leave)
Puerto Rico		8	100%	<1	100%	0	—N/a	Employer liability
Saint Kitts and Nevis		13	65%	0	—N/a	0	—N/a	Social security
Saint Lucia		13	65%	0	—N/a	0	—N/a	Social security
Saint Vincent and the Grenadines		13	65%					Social security
Trinidad and Tobago		14	100% for first month, 50% for subsequent months	0	—N/a			Mixed (2/3 social security, 1/3 employer)
Uruguay		14	100%	<2	100%			Mixed (Social security maternity leave; employer liability paternity leave)
United States of America (federal) (Note: The United States of America has no national law guaranteeing paid parental leave. Since 2002, California law instituted state-wide paid parental leave. As of April 2022, similar laws mandating paid parental leave also exist in Connecticut, Massachusetts, New Jersey, New York, Rhode Island, Washington, and the District of Columbia; similar laws have been passed, but programs are not yet active in Colorado, Maryland, and Oregon.)		0	—N/a	0	—N/a	12 each (Note: The Family and Medical Leave Act of 1993 mandates 12 weeks of unpaid parental leave for most public employees and certain eligible employees of private employers with more than 50 employees within a 75-mile radius.)	Unpaid	—N/a
United States (state-level) (Note: Paid Family Leave is mandatory in eleven states plus the District of Columbia)		6 to 12 weeks (6 weeks in Rhode Island, 8 weeks in California and 12 weeks in Colorado, Connecticut, Delaware, Maryland, Massachusetts, New Jersey, New York, Oregon, Washington and the District of Columbia)	Varies by state	6 to 12 weeks (6 weeks in Rhode Island, 8 weeks in California and 12 weeks in Colorado, Connecticut, Delaware, Maryland, Massachusetts, New Jersey, New York, Oregon, Washington and the District of Columbia)	Varies by state	—N/a	—N/a	Mixed (Social or private insurance)
Venezuela		26	100%	2	100%	0	—N/a	Social security

=== Asia ===
Country	Paid maternity leave	Paid paternity leave	Unpaid maternity leave	Unpaid paternity leave	Paid parental (Note: Either parent) leave	Restrictions
Afghanistan	90 days 100%					
Bahrain	60 days 100%		There is unpaid maternity leave for taking care of a child not exceeding six years of age, of maximum six-month each time and for three times throughout the period of the mother's service.			
Bangladesh	16 weeks (8 weeks before delivery and 8 weeks after delivery) 100%		In case of third-plus-time mother, who has two or more babies alive already.			
Cambodia	90 days 50%	10 days' special leave for family events				
China	14 weeks					
Hong Kong	14 weeks (100% for 10 weeks, up to HK$80,000 for the rest)	5 days 80%, public servant 100%				
India	26 weeks 100%.	Up to 15 days' (3 working weeks) male leave 100%(only for Government Employees). For private sector, it is as per company policies				Prohibits employers from allowing women to work within six weeks after giving birth. A female employee is eligible only if she worked for the employer and contributed for at least 80 days during the 12-month period preceding the date of expected delivery. In the case of a stillbirth, miscarriage or an abortion, six weeks of paid leave is required instead. From the third child onwards, only 12 weeks of paid maternity leave is permitted.
Indonesia	3 months 100%	Two days' paid when wife gives birth				
Iran	6 months 100%	2 weeks compulsory 100%				
Iraq	62 days 100%					
Israel	15 weeks 100%, with an additional 12 weeks unpaid. The weeks from 6th to 15th can be taken by the father.	Can take the paid leave instead of the mother starting from the 6th week (up to 15 weeks)	1 year			
Japan	14 weeks 60%				1 year	
Jordan	10 weeks 100%					
Korea, Republic of	90 days 100%	10 days			Parents who have a child aged not more than 8 years or in the 2nd or lower grade of an elementary school are eligible for one year of child care leave paid by the Employment Insurance Fund at 40% of normal wage.	
Korea, Democratic People's Republic of	11 weeks					
Kuwait	70 days 100%					
Lao People's Democratic Republic	3 months 70%					
Lebanon	10 weeks 100%	1 day 100%				
Malaysia	98 days 100%	7 days 100%				
Mongolia	120 days 70%					
Myanmar	12 weeks 66.7%	Six days of "casual leave" that can be used by fathers to assist their spouses at the time of confinement				
Nepal	98 days	15 days				
Oman	14 weeks, 100%; 50 days prior to and 50 days after birth (per Omani Labor Law, Royal Decree No. 35/2003, 26 April 2003).					
Pakistan	180 days for the birth of the first child, 120 days for the second, and 90 days for the third, 100%. For additional children unpaid leave can be granted.	30 days 100% for the first three separate births. For additional children, unpaid leave can be granted.				
Philippines	105 days 100%, applicable also to miscarriages. 7 days' 100% parental leave per year for solo parents until the child is 18, or indefinitely if the child has a disability.	14 days' paid paternity leave for married workers. Seven days' 100% parental leave per year for solo parents until the child is 18, or indefinitely if the child has a disability.				
Qatar	50 days 100% for civil servants					
Saudi Arabia	10 weeks 50% or 100%	Three days				
Singapore	16 weeks 100% (Singaporean citizen) or 12 weeks 67% (non-Singaporean citizen)	2 weeks of 100% government-paid paternity leave for fathers. Up to 4 weeks of 100% government-paid shared parental leave to allow fathers to share up to 4 weeks of the working mother's maternity leave entitlement. (all covered under Employment Act)				16 weeks of maternity leave is restricted to women whose children are Singapore citizens and has served her employer for at least 90 days before the child's birth.
Sri Lanka	12 weeks 100% (84 working days), 84 days 50%	3 days 100% (only for state sector employees). For private sector, it is as per company policies.	84 days			
Syrian Arab Republic	50 days 70%					
Taiwan	8 weeks 100% for more than six months of employment or 50% for less six months of employment	5 days 100%	Two years of unpaid leave under certain conditions (also can be partly paid from Employment Insurance Parental Leave Allowance)	Two years of unpaid leave under certain conditions (also can be partly paid from Employment Insurance Parental Leave Allowance)		
Thailand	98 days (100% of salary during the first 45 days of leave, and that first half of the leave period is paid by the employer. The second half of leave is paid by social security [at 50%, and subject to a monthly cap of THB 15,000]).					
United Arab Emirates	45 days 100% (plus an additional unpaid leave, there is total of 100 days' maternity leave)		55 days			Maternity leave at 100% pay is subject to the employee having served continuously for not less than one year. The maternity leave shall be granted with half-pay if the woman has not completed one year.
Vietnam	4–6 months 100%					
Yemen	60 days 100%					

=== Europe and Central Asia ===
Country	Maternity leave		Paternity leave		Parental (Note: Either parent) leave		Source of payment
Country	Length (weeks)	Pay	Length (weeks)	Pay	Length (weeks)	Pay	Source of payment
Albania	52	80% for 21 weeks; 50% remainder	0	—N/a	2	100%	Mixed (Social security for maternity leave; employer liability for parental leave)
Andorra	20	100%	4	—N/a	0	—N/a	Social security
Armenia	20	100%	0	—N/a	156	Unpaid	Social security
Austria	16	100%	0	—N/a	104	Flat rate	Social security
Azerbaijan	18	100%	2	Unpaid	156	Flat rate	Social security
Belarus	18	100%	0	—N/a	156	80% of minimum wage	Social security
Belgium	15	82% for 4 weeks; 75% for remainder, with a maximum	2	100% for 3 days; 82% remainder	There are 17 weeks of leave for each parent, with different options of using it: in one go, in several parts, by reducing work hours, by taking one half day or one full day off per week.	Flat rate	Mixed (3 days' paternity leave employer liability; Social security)
Bosnia and Herzegovina	52	50–100%	1+	100%	156	Unpaid	Mixed (Social security maternity leave; employer liability paternity leave)
Bulgaria	58	90%	2	90%	104	Flat-rate for 52 weeks; unpaid remainder	Social security
Croatia	58	100% for 26 weeks; flat-rate remainder	2	100%	156	Unpaid	Mixed (Social security maternity leave; employer liability paternity leave)
Cyprus	22	75%	2	75%	18 each	60% 8 weeks; unpaid remainder	Social security
Czech Republic	28	70%	0	—N/a	156	Flat rate	Social security
Denmark	18	100%	2	100%	32 each (can be extended by 8 or 14 weeks)	100%	Mixed (social security & employer)
Estonia	14	100%	4	100%	68	100%	Social security
Finland	18	70%	11	70%, with a maximum	26	70%	Social security
France	16	100%	5	100%, with a maximum	156	Flat rate	Social security
Georgia	18	100%			50		Social security
Germany	14	100%	0	—N/a	156	67%, with a maximum, for 58 weeks (52 if father does not participate); unpaid remainder	Mixed (social security & employer liability)
Greece	17	100%	2	100%	17 each	Unpaid	Mixed (Social security maternity leave; employer liability paternity leave)
Hungary	24	70%	1	100%	156	70% (up to a ceiling) for 104 weeks; flat rate remainder	Social security
Iceland	13	80%	12	80%, with a maximum	26 each	80%, with a maximum, for first 13 weeks each; unpaid remainder	
Ireland	42	80%, with a maximum, for 26 weeks; unpaid remainder	2	Flat rate (minimum €230 per week)	26 each	Unpaid	Social security
Italy	22	80%	>1	100%	26 each	30%	Social security
Kazakhstan	18	100%	1	Unpaid	156	Unpaid	Social security
Kyrgyzstan	18	7 × minimum wage			78 (in some cases 156)	Unpaid	Social security
Latvia	16	80%	2	80%	78 each	70%	Social security
Liechtenstein	20	80%					
Lithuania	18	100%	4	100%, with a maximum	156	100% for 52 weeks or 70% for 104 weeks; unpaid remainder	Social security
Luxembourg	20	100%	2	100%	Both parents are entitled to equal parental leave. The "first parental leave" must be taken (by either the mother or the father) immediately after the end of maternity leave. The "second parental leave" may be taken by the other parent at any time up until the child's 6th birthday. Parental leave can be taken in a variety of formats: 4 or 6 months full-time leave; 8 or 12 months with 50% leave and 50% working; 4 months leave split over a maximum period of 20 months; 1 day per week on leave for up to 20 months; The latter three options require the employer's approval. The first option is an absolute right and cannot be refused by the employer. Self-employed people and apprentices are also fully entitled to parental leave.	100% (up to a maximum gross monthly salary of €4,284.88).	Mixed (maternity leave: social security; paternity leave: 80/20 social security/employer; parental leave: depends on formula chosen – employer pays for time worked, social security pays for time on leave)
North Macedonia	39	100%					Social security
Malta	18	100% for 14 weeks	0	—N/a	17 each	Unpaid	Mixed (social security & employer liability)
Moldova	18	100%	0	—N/a	156	Partially	Social security
Monaco	18	90%, with a maximum	0	—N/a	0	—N/a	Social security
Montenegro	52	100%					Social security
Netherlands	16	100%, with a maximum	6	100%	26 each (with part-time work)	70%, with a maximum of 9 weeks	Mixed (Social security maternity leave; employer liability paternity leave)
Norway	15	100% of earnings up to a ceiling of $66 000 (2023)	2 + 15	100% of earnings up to a ceiling of $66 000 (2023)	Paid leave: 16 weeks; Unpaid leave: 52 weeks	100% of earnings up to a ceiling of $66 000 (2023)	Mixed (Social security expect first two weeks of paternity leave)
Norway	19	80% of earnings up to a ceiling of $66 000 (2023)	2 + 19	80% of earnings up to a ceiling of $66 000 (2023)	Paid leave: 18 weeks; Unpaid leave: 52 weeks	80% of earnings up to a ceiling of $66 000 (2023)	Mixed (Social security expect first two weeks of paternity leave)
Poland	26	100%	2	100%	156	60% for 26 weeks; flat rate for 104; unpaid remainder	Social security
Portugal	17 (or 21)	100% for 17 weeks or 80% for 21	4	100%	There are two types of leave: Paid leave: 13 each; "sharing bonus" of 4 weeks if initial leave shared. Unpaid leave: After the paid leave, and only if this leave has been taken, one of the parents may take up to two years of childcare leave (licença para assistência a filho) on a full-time basis, extended to three years when there is a third or subsequent child.	Partly 30%, partly unpaid	Social security
Romania	18 (9 weeks before the anticipated date of birth, and 9 weeks after the anticipated date of birth)	85%	5 days (15 days if an infant care course is taken). Can be taken at any point within the first eight weeks after the birth of the baby.	100%	One parent is entitled to: 104 weeks (so until the child reaches the age of two; if taken by the mother, it includes the maternal leave after the birth); or 156 weeks if the child has a disability (so until the child reaches the age of three). Other parent is entitled to only 4 weeks (can be taken at any point during the first 2–3 years of the child's upbringing).	85% with a maximum (8500 lei per month)	Social security
Russia	20	100%, with a maximum	0	—N/a	156	40%, with a maximum, for 78 weeks; unpaid remainder	Social security
Serbia	20	100%	1+	100%	52 (only mothers)	100% for 26 weeks; 60% for 12 weeks; 30% for 12 weeks	Mixed (Social security maternity leave; employer liability paternity leave)
Slovakia	34	65%	0	—N/a	156	Flat rate	Social security
Slovenia	15	100%	4	100%, with a ceiling	37	100%, with a ceiling	Social security
Spain	16	100%	16	100%	156 (including maternity/paternity leave, after which it starts)	Unpaid	Social security
Sweden	12	80%, with a maximum	12	80%, with a maximum	56	80% (up to a ceiling) for 56 weeks; flat rate for remainder	Social security
Switzerland	14	80%, with a maximum	2	80%, with a maximum	0 (24 in Geneva)	—N/a	Social security
Tajikistan	20	100%	0	—N/a	156	Flat rate for 78 weeks; unpaid remainder	Social security
Turkey	16	66.70%	0	—N/a	26 (only mothers)	Unpaid	Social security
Turkmenistan	16	100%			156	Unpaid	Social security
Ukraine	18	100%	0	—N/a	156	Flat rate for 78 weeks; childcare allowance remainder	Social security
United Kingdom	52 (2 weeks mandatory for the mother, up to 50 of the remainder can be transferred to the father as shared parental leave)	90% for 6 weeks; 90% or £187.18 (whichever is lower), with a maximum, for 33 weeks; unpaid remainder	2 (plus up to 50 weeks transferred from the mother as shared parental leave)	90%, with a maximum	13 each	Unpaid	Mixed (employers reimbursed)
Uzbekistan	18	100%	0	—N/a	156	20% of minimum wage for 104 weeks; unpaid remainder	Social security

=== Oceania ===
Country	Maternity leave		Paternity leave		Parental (Note: Either parent) leave		Source of payment
Country	Length (weeks)	Pay	Length (weeks)	Pay	Length (weeks)	Pay	Source of payment
Australia	18	Parental Leave Pay is based on the weekly rate of the national minimum wage which is A$812.45 per week or A$162.49 per day before tax as of 1 July 2022. In most cases, the Australian Government makes PLP to the employer, who then pays the employee and as such PLP is a taxable Centrelink payment. However, PLP from the Australian Government does not affect paid parental leave offered by the employer and is therefore paid in addition.	5	National Minimum Wage (2 weeks); unpaid (3 weeks)	Up to 52 weeks' shared between the parents	Unpaid	Mixed
Fiji	12	Flat rate	0	N/A	0	N/A	
Kiribati	12	25%	0	N/A	0	N/A	
New Zealand	26	Maximum $585.80	2	Unpaid	up to 52 weeks shared between the parents	Partly paid	
Papua New Guinea	12	Unpaid	0	N/A	0	N/A	N/A
Solomon Islands	12	25%	0	N/A	0	N/A	

=== Parental leave policies in the United Nations ===
As international organizations are not subject to the legislation of any country, they have their own internal legislation on parental leave.

Organization	Paid maternity leave	Paid paternity leave	Unpaid parental leave	Restrictions
United Nations	16 weeks 100% (however, no fewer than 10 weeks must be after delivery, even if the pre-delivery leave was longer due to a late birth)	4 weeks 100% (or 8 weeks for staff members serving at locations where they are not allowed to live with their family)	Special leave without pay for a period of up to two years may be granted as parental leave under staff rule 105.2 (a) (iii) b to a staff member who is the mother or the father of a newly born or adopted child, provided the staff member has a permanent appointment, or has completed three years of continuous service on a fixed-term appointment and is expected by the Secretary-General to continue in service for at least six months beyond the date of return from the proposed parental leave.	The fact that a staff member is or will be on parental leave cannot be a factor in deciding contract renewal. To ensure that this is enforced, if a contract ends while the staff member is on parental leave, the contract must be extended to cover the duration of such leave.

=== Parental leave policies by countries ===
==== Luxembourg ====
Parents in Luxembourg are entitled to parental leave for both childbirth and adoption. When the mother gives birth, regardless of whether she is an employee, self-employed or an apprentice, she is entitled to pre-natal maternity leave of 8 weeks before the expected due date and 12 weeks' post-natal leave. The father, meanwhile, gets 10 days' leave after the birth, which must be taken within 2 months of the child's birth. For adoptions, one of parents can take up to 12 weeks' leave if the adopted child is under the age of 12. Luxembourg provides a fixed compensation rate during parental leave, which is €1,778, while most of the other European countries get compensation as a percentage of the salary. Luxembourg doesn't have a policy for maternity allowance in place or in addition to the maternity leave pay. Maternity allowance means the money paid during pregnancy or just after child birth. According 2013 OECD data, public expenditure on maternal and paternal leaves on per child born was the most in Luxembourg out of almost all the European countries at the 35,000 at prices and PPPs of 2013 in USD.

On 1 December 2016, "family leave reform bill 7060" was passed in the Luxembourg parliament. According to this new reform, now fathers and mothers can take leave together. The first leave has to be taken right after maternity leave and the second can be taken before the child turns 6 years old. This new reform provides much more flexibility. The parent has four options: either they can take 4 to 6 months' full leave, 8 to 12 months' part-time leave, take one day off per week for 20 months or can take 4 individual months within 20 months. The official Luxembourg government portal suggests that according to the data collected more than 85% of the parents are extremely happy with this new reform and 79% people think that this new system is better than the older system.

==== France ====
In France, there is maternity leave, paternity/partner leave and parental leave. The maternity leave, the number of weeks a biological mother is allowed to leave work is 16 weeks in France—6 weeks before birth and 10 weeks post-birth. Maternity leave is 26 weeks for the third and subsequent children, and 34 weeks for twins. Maternity leave is mandatory, the mother must take at least part of the leave, complete renouncement of the leave is forbidden. Paternity/partner leave is 25 days. Parental leave in France (Congé Parental) refers to the system of leave that is guaranteed to both fathers and mothers in cases of either childbirth or adoption, and can be taken for up to three years. In France, there are differences regarding the regulation on parental leave, based on number of children, how it is shared between parents, payment, and type of job. Payment varies between six months and three years.

==== India ====
Maternity leave in India is 26 weeks (8 prenatal and 18 postnatal) and is paid at 100% rate of the employee's salary. India's maternity leave policy is regulated by The Code on Social Security, 2020. The employee must have worked in the company for at least 80 working days before availing this benefit and the woman would also be entitled to a medical bonus alongside the 100% paid leave. For women with already two children, the maternity leave reduces to 12 weeks. Only employees of state-owned enterprises and civil servants are entitled to paternity leave which is two weeks, while women civil servants are entitled to one year worth of parental leave, including the maternity leave.

==== Germany ====
Maternity leave in Germany is 14 weeks (6 prenatal and 8 postnatal), and parental leave is 3 years. Parents in Germany can request up to 3 years parental leave, which is partly paid with parental allowance. Parental leave can be taken immediately after maternity leave (the weeks of maternity leave after birth are included in the duration of the parental leave) or immediately after birth (for fathers) or it may be taken at later times. Parental leave can be taken all in a go, or in a fractioned way. It can be taken all before the child's 3rd birthday, or it may be extended until the 8th birthday; however at least one year must be taken before the third birthday (otherwise that year is lost). All parents who have legal parental rights are entitled to parental leave (including non-biological and same-sex). Parental allowance is paid during part of the parental leave; the amount and duration of payment has changed several times throughout the years. It is possible to be on parental leave and work a limited amount of hours, without losing the parental leave benefits. The advantage of working while on parental leave is that vacation (annual leave) continues to accrue; however, if one does not work at all on parental leave, that person's vacation leave entitlement reduces by one twelfth for each month during which one is taking parental leave (i.e. after a full year of parental leave the vacation entitlement for next year has been lost, unless there are remainder vacation days which had been accumulated before the parental leave, or unless the employer agrees otherwise). Parental leave is job protected, the employee has the right to return to the same job, or in certain situations, to a different position that is similar to the previous one.

==== Canada ====
Canada has two parental leave benefit programs for the care of a newborn or adopted child: a federal program, and provincial programs. Every Canadian province offers at least seventeen weeks of maternity leave, with the exception of Alberta – where maternity leave is fifteen weeks long. The eligibility for maternity leave is that the individual has to be the child's birth mother (including surrogate mother). There have to be at least 15 weeks leave (maternity leave can start up to 12 weeks before birth). In addition to maternity leave, there is parental leave, the length of which depends on payment: there is an option between standard parental leave up to 40 weeks (but one parent cannot receive more than 35 weeks) which is paid at the rate of 55% up to $638 weekly; and extended parental leave up to 69 weeks (but one parent cannot receive more than 61 weeks) which is paid at the rate of 33% up to $383.

Due to parental leave being under provincial jurisdiction, there is a decentralized nature to the policies concerning leave benefit programs. For example, the province of Quebec has some of the greatest maternity leave benefits in the country. In Quebec, a greater number of people are eligible for parental leave benefits and there are more benefits they can receive, compared to other provinces. The variety among provinces concerning parental leave has raised debates on whether there should be a unitary federal program for parental leave policies in Canada.

== Miscarriage leave ==
In some countries, parental leave is also offered to parents who have had a miscarriage.

- The Philippines – 60 days' fully paid leave for the mother for miscarriages (before 20 weeks of gestation) or emergency termination of the pregnancy (on the 20th week or after) The husband of the mother gets 7 days' fully paid leave up to the 4th pregnancy.
- India – six weeks' leave for the mother
- Mauritius – two weeks' leave for the mother
- Indonesia – six weeks' leave for the mother
- New Zealand – 3 days' bereavement leave for both parents
- Taiwan – five days, one week or four weeks, depending on how advanced the pregnancy was, for the mother
- United Kingdom – Statutory Parental Bereavement Leave is available under UK legislation to the parents of a child who dies under the age of 18, or where a child is stillborn after 24 weeks of pregnancy. In Northern Ireland this entitlement was provided for in the Parental Bereavement (Leave and Pay) Act (Northern Ireland) 2022.

== See also ==
- Baby bonus
- Cost of raising a child
- Leave of absence
- Maternity leave and the Organisation for Economic Co-operation and Development
- Pregnancy discrimination
- Sick leave
- Time bind
- Postpartum care
- Motherhood penalty
