= Paternity and Adoption Leave Regulations 2002 =

United Kingdom labour law

- Statutory Instrument
- Parliament of the United Kingdom
- Citation: SI 2002/2778
- Territorial extent: England and Wales; Scotland; Northern Ireland

Dates
- Made: 11 November 2002
- Commencement: 8 December 2002

Other legislation
- Made under: Employment Rights Act 1996

Status: Current legislation

Text of statute as originally enacted

Text of the Paternity and Adoption Leave Regulations 2002 as in force today (including any amendments) within the United Kingdom, from legislation.gov.uk.

The Paternity and Adoption Leave Regulations 2002 (SI 2002/2788) are a statutory instrument concerning UK labour law. They confer on fathers a bare right to two weeks leave, paid at £140.98 in 2017, for the purpose of looking after children.

== Contents ==
The Paternity and Adoption Leave Regulations 2002 regulations 5-14 concern paternity rights, regulations 16-27 concern adoption, and 28-31 contain provisions which apply to both kinds of leave.

- r 4 expected date of birth;
- r 5 leave must be taken between the date of birth and 56 days later
- r 6 up to two consecutive weeks leave for paternity at the low rate of maternity pay
- r 8 paternity leave must be taken for the purposes of caring for a child or supporting the child’s mother or adopter
- r 10 notice requirements for paternity
- r 12 contract subsists
- r 13 right to return to the same job after a period of leave, so long as no more than 4 weeks parental leave has been taken as well
- r 14 same seniority, pensions and other rights as if not absent
- rr 15-20 period of adoption leave equivalent to maternity for the primary carer of the child
- r 17 notice before the expected date of placement
- r 20 provision for non-placement or death of a child
- r 28, no detriment for wanting to take or taking paternity or adoption leave, as under ERA 1996 s 47C
- r 29, under ERA 1996 s 99, employee will be regarded as unfairly dismissed if the principal reason was about paternity or adoption leave.
- r 30, one has to choose between paternity leave and adoption leave, but cannot choose both.
- r 31, pay is calculated as the average amount in the 12 weeks before the leave.

== See also ==
- Child care in the United Kingdom
- Tax Credits and Child tax credit, Working tax credit
