= Marie Hilton =

British pioneer of creches in London

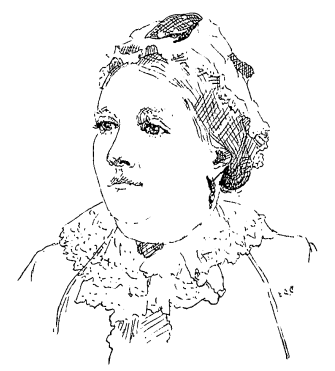
- Born: 11 July 1821; London
- Died: 10 April 1896 (aged 74); South Hackney

Marie Hilton born Marie Case (1821 – 1896) was a British pioneer of child care. She created "Mrs's Hilton's Creche, Infirmary and Orphan's Home" in London to enable working-class mothers to work jobs outside of the home. Throughout her career, over thirty thousand children had been looked after at Marie’s establishments.

== Early life ==
Hilton had a difficult start in life. Her grandmother took her in when her parents failed to care for her. Her Anglican grandmother objected to her attending another denomination's church service, but Hilton did not follow her instruction. When she was in London she went to a Congregational Church service in Westminster. She not only joined the church aged twenty but she became an active member helping with their Sunday School and temperance work.

She moved to Nottinghamshire and in 1843 to Brighton where she attended services organised by the Society of Friends. She married a Quaker, John Hilton, and they had five children. They moved to London and in 1866 she joined the Society of Friends and she helped with the mission. They moved where they could attend the meeting house in Ratcliff and she became involved again in mission work.

== Inspiration from Europe ==
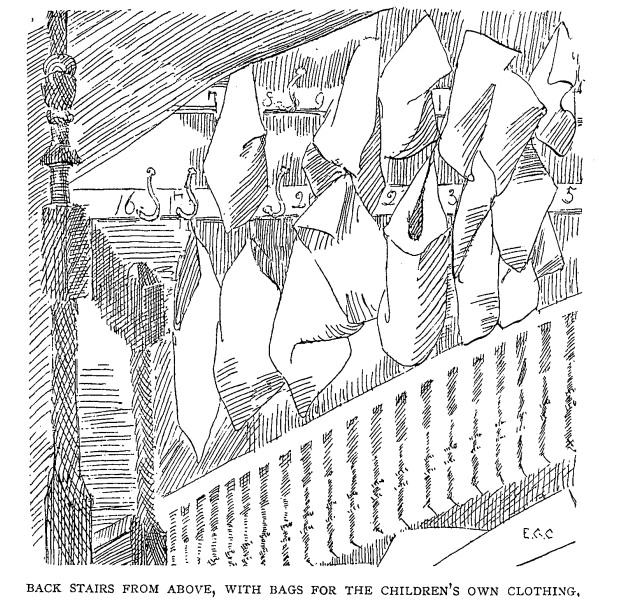
Marie Hilton's crèche had bags for the children's clothing

Firmin Marbeau had founded the first crèche in 1844 in Paris. The crèche provided child care to enable working-class mothers to work jobs outside of the home, Hilton came across the idea in Brussels in 1870 where over 500 children were cared for. She realised this was a solution to her worries. She had witnessed the children of working mothers in London who did not get enough attention. Their mothers loved them but they did not have the time and energy to look after them.

== "Mrs Hilton's Creche" Opens Up ==
What became known as "Mrs Hilton's Creche" opened on 22 February 1871 with 25 young children. It initially occupied one house in Stepney Causeway. When the children arrived their clothes would be put out "to air" in bags and they would be washed and dressed in the creche's own clothes. Nurses were employed to care for the children. By 1889 it was "Mrs. Hilton's Creche, Infirmary and Orphan's Home" and it occupied three houses. By 1896 it catered for 120 children in three houses.

== Death and legacy ==
She died at her home in 1896. Her son, John Deane Hilton, who was a writer wrote her biography, Marie Hilton: Her Life and Work, 1821-1896.
