= Broodfonds =

Dutch collective

Broodfonds (English: "Bread fund") is a Dutch collective that allows independent entrepreneurs to provide each other with temporary sick leave. Those who wish to participate in a bread fund can join an existing group of likeminded entrepreneurs, or start one themselves. The recommended minimum is 25 people, the maximum size is 50 people to avoid a degree of anonymity. A 'broodfonds' organises solidarity by personal connections and networking, and its members are self-governing.

== Specifics ==
Members of a bread fund group who fall sick receive donations from the other members in their group, the total amounting to a net monthly income. The participants open individual bank accounts dedicated to their 'bread fund'. On these accounts, the people who join a broodfonds save a fixed amount per month: between €33.75 and €112.50. They also pay a one-time service fee of €250 and a monthly contribution of €10. If members fall sick, they receive net donations depending on their own monthly contribution: between €750 and €2500. Personal donations can be tax-free under Dutch tax law. The monthly savings that accumulate on the bankaccount of each member are personal credit and when people cancel their participation they collect this sum.

Pieter Hilhorst, writing in de Volkskrant, described the fund as "a new kind of solidarity", in which a social network helps its members cope with financial trouble. Members can receive support for a maximum of two years. As of May 2015, the BroodfondsMakers claim 5000 participants in 142 'broodfondsen'.

== Critique ==
The logistics of the plan suggest that financial risk for the group is greatest in the first years of participation, when members have little savings. According to Tijs van den Boomen, opinioning in de Volkskrant, the associated fees and costs in 2011 for members were too high. He also estimated the risk of illness among members in the first few years so great, that payments for sick leave risked being cut, especially if the group remained small or if several members suddenly left the group. He felt that freelancers were better off individually saving money for sick leave than save in a small-scale 'crumbs-collective'. With 1 percent of sick people among the 5000-plus participants in 2015, there appear to be no excessive claims. Critics and journalists with expertise in finance and insurance remain wary and worn for the risks of the amateur self-management by members. The upcoming 'broodfonds' platform Risicodelen therefore provides a professional management team to protect their groups from financial mismanagement.

== Practice ==
Haro Kraak, reporting on a broodfonds in 2013, indicated that the risk of excessive claims of sickness or fraud were not manifest when he interviewed members of a group of some forty freelancers in Amsterdam, where two members were sick. Tjitske Mussche, chair of that fund, said the concept is based on existing working relations and friendships and that it requires a degree of trust from its members. Their fund is called "Soup fund": "When someone is sick, you bring them soup. So now we bring every sick person a pot of soup". In practice, she said, most freelancers and self-employed people in her 'broodfonds' want to avoid the high fees of income insurance and are pleased to be able to support each other in times of need. Participants are happy to arrange their own safety-net, as they see fit.
