= Additional Paternity Leave Regulations 2010 =

United Kingdom labour law

- Statutory Instrument
- Parliament of the United Kingdom
- Citation: SI 2010/1055
- Territorial extent: England and Wales; Scotland; Northern Ireland

Dates
- Made: 24 March 2010
- Commencement: 6 April 2010

Other legislation
- Made under: Employment Rights Act 1996

Status: Current legislation

Text of statute as originally enacted

Text of the Additional Paternity Leave Regulations 2010 as in force today (including any amendments) within the United Kingdom, from legislation.gov.uk.

The Additional Paternity Leave Regulations 2010 (SI 2010/1055) are a statutory instrument involving UK labour law, which introduced a basic right for mothers to transfer their right to unpaid leave to their partner if the mother has returned to work in the last three months of her nine-month maternity leave.

The measure was pushed by the Women and Equality minister Harriet Harman, but the opposition saw it as a mere electoral promise.

== See also ==
- Child care in the United Kingdom
- Tax Credits and Child tax credit, Working tax credit
- Additional Statutory Paternity Pay (Weekly Rates) Regulations 2010 (SI 2010/1060) r 2, the same statutory rate to maternity leave of [£128.73] applies.
