= Children's Regional Planning Committee =

Children's Regional Planning Committees were established in England and Wales by the Secretary of State for Social Services in 1970 under Section 35 of the Children and Young Persons Act 1969. They comprised one elected representative from each county and county borough council in the area which they covered and were funded by those same councils. There were eleven committees throughout England (North, Yorkshire and Humberside, North Western, West Midlands, East Midlands, East Anglia, Home Counties, London Boroughs, South East, Wessex, and South West) and one for Wales.

The task of these committees was to prepare development plans for a system of community children's homes in their area and to prepare schemes of "intermediate treatment" (i.e. an intermediate step to be taken before removing a child who was in trouble or at risk into care).
