= Commotion Ltd v Rutty =

UK Employment Appeal Tribunal case

- Decided: 13 October 2005
- Citation: [2006] IRLR 171 (EAT)

Court membership
- Judge sitting: Judge Burke QC

Keywords
- Flexible working, unfair dismissal

Commotion Ltd v Rutty [2006] IRLR 171 (EAT) is an Employment Appeal Tribunal case in which an employer, who denied its staff flexible working time, was found in breach of the Employment Rights Act 1996 for failing to have any lawful reason.

== Facts ==
Rutty was a warehouse assistant in Tonbridge, Kent packing educational toys for Commotion Ltd’s business. She and her husband had to take over care for their grand daughter, Jasmine. Rutty asked the warehouse supervisor, Mr Wood, for flexible working time, as a three-day week. She was denied on the basis that the employer wanted to keep her as a full-time member, by a Mr Brown. She appealed, and Mr Coote rejected her claim again, writing back saying that the company's policy was to ‘help to create a team spirit by having a uniform working day’. She resigned and claimed her application was unreasonably rejected, constructive unfair dismissal and indirect discrimination.

== Judgment ==
=== Tribunal ===
The Tribunal held that there were no grounds on which the employer had shown that flexible working could not be accommodated, and hence its decision was based on incorrect facts.

The Tribunal's experience is, and no evidence has been brought before us in this case to show that working as a part-time warehouse assistant is not feasible, that with thought the workforce and the work required to be done can be organised so that there is no diminution in the service to customers, that the whole workforce can be organised to cope with that work with some people who have other commitments working on a part-time basis and others full-time. There has not been a shred of evidence that proper enquiry and proper investigation was carried out by the Respondents when dealing with this request. It must follow that our findings in this respect also go on to the question of justification in the indirect discrimination claim... One of the reasons for the dismissal was the fact of the manner in which the Respondents had dealt with the Claimant's request for flexibility. She responded very shortly after the rejection of the appeal – within a few days. It was clear that the two were linked. She did not raise a grievance, it was submitted, but to require her to have raised a further grievance before bringing her claim to the Tribunal just beggars belief and it would be a nonsense. Commonsense tells us that she had had enough …. So, for all those reasons, we find that the Respondents were in breach of the implied duty of trust and confidence entitling the Claimant to terminate her employment".

=== Employment Appeal Tribunal ===
Judge Burke QC upheld the tribunal, whose decision was not perverse or contrary to the law set out in the Employment Rights Act 1996 ss 80F-H.

36... Mr Dunn's submission is the Tribunal erred in law …. The point which we have generally described is sub-divided into what we might describe as four heads. First of all it said that the Tribunal were not entitled to embark on any objective assessment of the assertion which the employer made, still less look to see whether it was objectively justified. Secondly, it is said that the Tribunal failed to have regard to the reasons set out in the employers' letters of rejection. Thirdly, it is said that the Tribunal were directing themselves to consider not ground (vi) in Section 80G(1)(b), which was the ground on which Commotion relied, but ground (ii) upon which they were not relying. Fourthly, it is said that the Tribunal's conclusion was perverse.

37 As to the first submission, we draw attention to the fact that the employee is entitled to present a complaint to an Employment Tribunal on the basis that the decision to reject his application for flexible working was based on incorrect facts sections see 80H(1)(b). It must follow that the Tribunal is entitled to investigate the evidence to see whether the decision was based on incorrect facts. There is, we would suggest, a sliding scale of the considerations which a Tribunal may be permitted to enter into in looking at such a refusal. The one end is the possibility that all that the employer has to do is to state his ground and there can be no investigation of the correctness or accuracy or truthfulness of that ground. At the other end is perhaps a full enquiry looking to see whether the employer has acted fairly, reasonably, and sensibly in putting forward that ground. Neither extreme is the position, in our judgment, which applies in the relevant statutory situation. We accept Mr Dunn's submission that the Tribunal is not entitled to look and see whether they regard the employer as acting fairly or reasonably when he puts forward his for rejection of the flexible working request. However, we reject Mr Dunn's submission that the Tribunal is not entitled to examine the facts objectively at all, for if they were not so entitled, the jurisdiction set out or the right to make an application set out by Section 80H(1)(b) would be of no use. The true position, in our judgment, is that the Tribunal is entitled to look at the assertion made by the employer i.e. the ground which he asserts is the reason why he has not granted the application and to see whether it is factually correct. In this case, it does not arise; but another case, it may be for instance that the bona fides of the assertion might have to be looked into.

38 In order for the Tribunal to establish whether or not the decision by the employer to reject the application was based on incorrect facts, the Tribunal must examine the evidence as to the circumstances surrounding the situation to which the application gave rise. In doing so, the Tribunal are entitled to enquire into what would have been the effect of granting the application…. We do not propose to go exhaustively through the matters at which a Tribunal might wish to look, but if the Tribunal were to look at such matters in order to test whether the assertion made by the employer was factually correct, that would not be any misuse of their powers and they would not be committing an error of law.

39 In our judgment, none of the four points made by Mr Dunn under this head is persuasive. We have indicated what the Tribunal is entitled to do. In paragraph 11 of their Judgment, they did not, in our view, stray outside what was permissible. They pointed out that no evidence had been brought before them to show that working as a part-time warehouse assistant was not feasible. They used their industrial experience to indicate their difficulty in accepting the correctness in fact of the employer's assertion. They pointed out that there was nothing to show that the work could not be done by proper organisation without diminution in the service to customers and that the employers had not carried out any enquiries or investigations to see whether what Mrs Rutty wanted could, in fact, be coped with. Those were legitimate points which they were entitled to consider and on which they were entitled to base their findings….

40 As to the second point, the Tribunal in their judgment clearly referred to the essential part of the employer's responses to Mrs Rutty's application and her appeal and, in paragraph 11, sufficiently addressed the grounds which the employer had put forward.

41 As to the third point, in the case of the warehouse where goods are picked out and packed to the order of customers, as in this case (this being a mail order warehouse) we can see no real difference to any sensible degree between an assertion that somebody working part-time will have a detrimental impact on performance and somebody working part-time would have a detrimental effect on the ability to meet customer demand. If there was a detrimental impact on performance, that would constitute a detrimental effect on ability to meet customer demand. The two appear to us to be mirror images of the same. What the Tribunal were addressing was, in a practical sense, the true nature of the employer's grounds for rejecting Mrs Rutty's request.

42 Lastly, we see no perversity. The Tribunal set out the relevant letters, they dealt with the evidence; they reached a conclusion which was a permissible option. We do not propose to say anything more about the well known perversity tests in this section of this judgment, any more than we did in the earlier section of our judgment. We are quite satisfied that they came to a conclusion which it was open to them to reach and that they had material before them in which to reach that judgment on the facts. They made findings of facts which were open to them; and we see no ground on which those findings of fact can be successfully attacked.

== See also ==
- ERA 1996
