= Qua v John Ford Morrison Solicitors =

- Court: Employment Appeal Tribunal
- Citation: [2003] ICR 482

Keywords
- Emergency leave, unfair dismissal

Qua v John Ford Morrison Solicitors [2003] ICR 482 (EAT) is a UK labour law case concerning emergency leave to care for children.

== Facts ==
Mrs Qua was absent for 17 days, because of her young son's medical problems. She had not told the employer quickly.

The Employment Tribunal held that she had not told the employer as soon as reasonably practicable and said how long she would be absent.

== Judgment ==
Cox J held that Mrs Qua had not done anything wrong, and ERA 1996 section 57A did not require the employee give daily updates about absence. He noted that even if the right to automatically unfair dismissal was lost because one did not comply with section 57A(2), then an employee who had been working over a year could still have an unfair dismissal claim. He added that the legislation only covers unforeseen emergencies, and employees cannot use the right to deal with regular occurrences, e.g. one day a week.

== See also ==
- UK labour law
- Unfair dismissal
