= Directive 2010/18/EU =

- European Union directive
- Title: Directive 2010/18/EU implementing the revised Framework Agreement on parental leave concluded by BUSINESSEUROPE, UEAPME, CEEP and ETUC and repealing Directive 96/34/E
- Made by: European Parliament and Council of the European Union
- Journal reference: L 68, 18 March 2010

Other legislation
- Replaces: Directive 96/34/EC
- Amended by: Directive 2013/62/EU
- Replaced by: Directive (EU) 2019/1158

Directive 2010/18/EU is a directive which concerns the basic rights of all parents to leave in the European Union. It was repealed and replaced by Directive (EU) 2019/1158.

== Contents ==
The main provisions of the directive are as follows:

- cl 2(1) time to care for children up to eight years old (2) for a minimum of four months
- cl 3(1) conditions that may apply include (a) leave on a full or part-time basis or piecemeal (b) a qualifying period under a year (c) under what circumstances an employer may postpone (d) special arrangements for small business (2) notice periods with regard to the worker
- cl 4, specific needs for adoptive parents
- cl 5, employment rights and non-discrimination (1) right to return to job, or if impossible, a similar one consistent with the contract (2) acquired rights to be maintained
- cl 6(1) return to work should allow for reasonable variations. (2) both encouraged to keep contact while away.
- cl 7, time off for urgent family reasons, sickness or accident.
- cl 8, can be more favourable

== See also ==
- European labour law
- United Kingdom labour law
