= Parental Leave Directive 2019 =

Directive of the European Union

Parental Leave Directive 2019 (2019/1158) is a directive in European Union law on work–life balance for parents and carers. It repeals Directive 2010/18/EU. It must be transposed by member states at the latest on 2 August 2022.

== Contents ==
The Work-life Balance Directive maintains the labour rights of the former Parental Leave Directive 2010, in a similar or a modified form, and introduces new rights. Its main provisions are:

- introduces paternity leave of at least 10 days
- maintains the right of parents to a minimum four months of parental leave, extending from one to two months the period of non-transferable leave
- introduces carers' leave of at least five days per year for workers to provide personal care or support to a relative
- extends the right to request flexible working arrangements to parents or carers of children under eight years old
- maintains the prohibitions on discrimination of parents
