= Pregnant Workers Directive 1992 =

Directive 92/85/EEC
- European Union directive
- Title: Directive on the introduction of measures to encourage improvements in the safety and health at work of pregnant workers and workers who have recently given birth or are breastfeeding
- Made by: Council of the European Union
- Made under: Article 118a (Treaty establishing the European Economic Community)
- Journal reference: L 348

History
- Date made: 19 October 1992
- Entry into force: 24 November 1992
- Implementation date: 24 November 1994

Other legislation
- Amended by: Directive 2007/30/EC, Directive 2014/27/EU

Pregnant Workers Directive 1992 (92/85/EEC) is a European Union Directive. It concerns the basic rights of workers during and after pregnancy in the European Union.

== Contents ==
The main provisions are as follows.

- art 2 definitions, ‘pregnant worker is one who informs the employer of her condition’
- art 3, guidelines to be drawn up for hazardous work for pregnant workers
- art 4, assessment and information
- art 5(1) exposure to risks to be avoided. (2) ‘If the adjustment of her working conditions and/or working hours is not technically and/or objectively feasible, or cannot reasonably be required on duly substantiated grounds, the employer shall take the necessary measures to move the worker concerned to another job.’ (3) if moving not technically feasible, leave to be granted.
- art 6, cases where exposure is prohibited
- art 7 no obligation for nightwork
- art 8(1) continuous period of maternity leave, at least 14 weeks long (2) compulsory for 2 weeks
- art 9 time off for ante natal examinations
- art 10 prohibition on dismissal, ‘save in exceptional cases not connected with their condition which are permitted under national legislation and/or practice’
- art 11(1) maintenance of employment rights in the employment contract (2)(b) ‘maintenance of a payment to, and/or entitlement to an adequate allowance for workers’ (3) it is adequate if it is at least the same as statutory sick pay

== Case law ==
- Parviainen v Finnair Oyj (2010) C-471/08, [2011] 1 CMLR 8, a pregnant worker transferred pursuant to art 5(2) to another job was entitled under art 11 to her basic salary and any pay components or supplementary allowances that related to her professional status, such as those relating to seniority, length of service and professional qualifications, but not those that depended on the performance of specific functions in particular circumstances and were intended, essentially, to compensate for the disadvantages related to that performance.
- Boyle v Equal Opportunities Commission (1998) C-411/96, [1998] ECR I-6401 Mrs Boyle worked for the EOC, which as an emanation of the state, was subject to the Directive with direct effect. At the time, paid maternity leave, after 6 weeks lasted 12 weeks and was £54.55 a week. The EOC's staff handbook required, among other things, the six mothers to repay contractual maternity pay if they did not return to work one month after leave. It was argued that Art 141 requires equal pay through the period of maternity leave, as compared to a man. The European Commission argued that contractual sick pay should be the appropriate comparison for a minimum of payment during the period of pregnancy. ECJ held that Art 11 ‘is intended to ensure that, during her maternity leave, the worker receives and increase at least equivalent to the sickness allowance provided for by national social security legislation in the event of a break in her activities on health grounds… it is not intended to guarantee her any higher income…’
- Abdoulaye v Regie Nationale des Usines Renault (1999) C-218/98, [1999] IRLR 811, it is not discrimination to pay women a maternity bonus.

== See also ==
- European labour law
