= Human resource management system =

Software

A human resources management system (HRMS), also human resources information system (HRIS) or human capital management (HCM) system, is a form of human resources (HR) software that combines a number of systems and processes to ensure the easy management of human resources, business processes and data. Human resources software is used by businesses to combine a number of necessary HR functions, such as storing employee data, managing payroll, recruitment, benefits administration (total rewards), time and attendance, employee performance management, and tracking competency and training records.

A human resources management system (HRMS) streamlines and centralizes daily HR processes, making them more efficient and accessible. It combines the principles of human resources—particularly core HR activities and processes—with the capabilities of information technology. This type of software developed much like data processing systems, which eventually evolved into the standardized routines and packages of enterprise resource planning (ERP) software. ERP systems originated from software designed to integrate information from multiple applications into a single, unified database. The integration of financial and human resource modules within one database is what distinguishes an HRMS, HRIS, or HCM system from a generic ERP solution.

== History ==
The use of information systems in human resources began with payroll automation in the late 1950s and expanded through the 1960s, when employee data was first processed by computer.

The first enterprise resource planning (ERP) system that integrated human resources functions was SAP R/2 (later to be replaced by R/3 and S/4hana), introduced in 1979. This system gave users the possibility to combine corporate data in real time and regulate processes from a single mainframe environment. Many of today's popular HR systems still offer considerable ERP and payroll functionality.

The first completely HR-centered client-server system for the enterprise market was PeopleSoft, released in 1987 and later bought by Oracle in 2005. Hosted and updated by clients, PeopleSoft overtook the mainframe environment concept in popularity. Oracle has also developed multiple similar BPM systems to automate corporate operations, including Oracle Cloud HCM.

Beginning in the late 1990s, HR vendors, started offering cloud-hosted HR services to make this technology more accessible to small and remote teams. Instead of a client-server, companies began using online accounts on web-based portals to access their employees' performance. Mobile applications have also become more common.

HRIS and HRMS technologies have allowed HR functions to focus more on strategic assets to an organisation rather than the more traditional administrative function. For example, these roles include employee development, as well as analyzing the workforce to target talent-rich areas.

== Functions ==
The function of human resources departments is administrative and common to all organizations. Organizations may have formalized selection, evaluation, and payroll processes. Management of "human capital" has progressed to an imperative and complex process. The HR function consists of tracking existing employee data, which traditionally includes personal histories, skills, capabilities, accomplishments, and salary. To reduce the manual workload of these administrative activities, organizations began to electronically automate many of these processes by introducing specialized human resource management systems.

HR executives rely on internal or external IT professionals to develop and maintain an integrated HRMS. Before client–server architectures evolved in the late 1980s, many HR automation processes were relegated to mainframe computers that could handle large amounts of data transactions. In consequence of the high capital investment necessary to buy or program proprietary software, these internally developed HRMS were limited to organizations that possessed a large amount of capital. The advent of client-server, application service provider, and software as a service (SaaS) or human resource management systems enabled higher administrative control of such systems. Currently, human resource management systems tend to encompass:

1. Retaining staff
2. Hiring
3. Onboarding & Offboarding
4. Administration
5. Managing payroll
6. Tracking and Managing employee benefits
7. HR planning
8. Recruiting
9. Learning management
10. Performance management and appraisals
11. Employee self-service
12. Scheduling and rota management
13. Absence management
14. Leave management
15. Reporting and analytics
16. Employee reassignment
17. Grievance handling by following precedents

The payroll module automates the pay process by gathering data on employee time and attendance, calculating various deductions and taxes, and generating periodic pay cheques and employee tax reports. Data is generally fed from human resources and timekeeping modules to calculate automatic deposit and manual cheque writing capabilities. This module can encompass all employee-related transactions as well as integrate with existing financial management systems.

The time and attendance module gathers standardized time and work related efforts. The most advanced modules provide broad flexibility in data collection methods, labor distribution capabilities and data analysis features. Cost analysis and efficiency metrics are the primary functions.

The benefits administration module provides a system for organizations to administer and track employee participation in benefits programs. These typically encompass insurance, compensation, profit sharing, and retirement.

The HR management module is a component covering many other HR aspects from hiring to retirement. The system records basic demographic and address data, selection, training and development, capabilities and skills management, compensation planning records and other related activities. Leading edge systems provide the ability to "read" applications and enter relevant data to applicable database fields, notify employers and provide position management and position control. Human resource management function involves the recruitment, placement, evaluation, compensation, and development of the employees of an organization. Initially, businesses used computer-based information systems to:

- produce paychecks and payroll reports;
- maintain personnel records;
- pursue talent management.

Online recruiting has become one of the primary methods employed by HR departments to garner potential candidates for available positions within an organization. Talent management systems, or recruitment modules, offer an integrated hiring solution for HRMS which typically encompass:

- analyzing personnel usage within an organization;
- identifying potential applicants;
- recruiting through company-facing listings;
- recruiting through online recruiting sites or publications that market to both recruiters and applicants;
- analytics within the hiring process (time to hire, source of hire, turnover);
- compliance management to ensure job ads and candidate onboarding follows government regulations.

The significant cost incurred in maintaining an organized recruitment effort, cross-posting within and across general or industry-specific job boards and maintaining a competitive exposure of availabilities has given rise to the development of a dedicated applicant tracking system (ATS) module.

The training module provides a system for organizations to administer and track employee training and development efforts. The system, normally called a "learning management system" (LMS) if a standalone product, allows HR to track education, qualifications, and skills of the employees, as well as outlining what training courses, books, CDs, web-based learning or materials are available to develop which skills. Courses can then be offered in date specific sessions, with delegates and training resources being mapped and managed within the same system. Sophisticated LMSs allow managers to approve training, budgets, and calendars alongside performance management and appraisal metrics.

The employee self-service module allows employees to query HR related data and perform some HR transactions over the system. Employees may query their attendance record from the system without asking the information from HR personnel. The module also lets supervisors approve O.T. requests from their subordinates through the system without overloading the task on HR department.

Many organizations have gone beyond the traditional functions and developed human resource management information systems, which support recruitment, selection, hiring, job placement, performance appraisals, employee benefit analysis, health, safety, and security, while others integrate an outsourced applicant tracking system that encompasses a subset of the above.

The analytics module enables organizations to extend the value of an HRMS implementation by extracting HR related data for use with other business intelligence platforms. For example, organizations combine HR metrics with other business data to identify trends and anomalies in headcount in order to better predict the impact of employee turnover on future output.

There are now many types of HRMS or HRIS, some of which are typically local-machine-based software packages; the other main type is an online cloud-based system that can be accessed via a web browser.

The staff training module enables organizations the ability to enter, track and manage employee and staff training. Each type of activity can be recorded together with the additional data. The performance of each employee or staff member is then stored and can be accessed via the Analytics module.

Employee reassign module is a recent additional functionality of HRMS. This module has the functions of transfer, promotion, pay revision, re-designation, deputation, confirmation, pay mode change and letter form.

== Employee self-service ==
Employee self-service (ESS) provides employees access to their personal records and details. ESS features include allowing employees to change their contact details, banking information, and benefits. ESS also allows for administrative tasks such as applying for leave, seeing absence history, reviewing timesheets and tasks, inquiring about available loan programs, requesting overtime payment, viewing compensation history, and submitting reimbursement slips. With the emergence of ESS, employees are able to transact with their Human Resources office remotely.

With ESS features, employees can take more responsibility for their present job, skill development, and career planning. As part of HRIS, feedback is given for skill profiles, training and learning, objective setting, appraisals and reporting/analytics. These systems are especially useful for businesses with remote workers, where employees are highly mobile, have flexible working, or not collocated with their manager.

== See also ==
- Bradford Factor – Measure of worker absenteeism
- E-HRM – Electronic human resource management
- Human resources for health (HRH) information system – Health data process
- Job analysis – Procedures to identify content of a job activities, attributes or requirements to perform
- Learning management system – Educational software application
- Organizational chart – Diagram showing organizational structure
- Strategic human resource planning – Process that identifies current and future human resources needs
- Applicant Tracking System – Software application for recruitment processes
- List of human resource management software
