= Truancy =

Unauthorized refusal to attend school

Truancy is any intentional, unauthorised, and/or legally debatable absence from compulsory education. It is a deliberate absence by a student's own free will and usually does not refer to legitimate excused absences, such as ones related to medical conditions. Truancy is usually explicitly defined in the school's handbook of policies and procedures. Attending school but not going to class is called internal truancy. Some children whose parents claim to homeschool have also been found truant in the United States.

In many countries, truancy is criminalized by law as either a criminal or a civil offense, and authorities can prosecute truant students (under the age of 18), their parents, or both. Some countries, like Canada or Australia, reserve fines for truant minors and allow for their detainment (but not arrest) while skipping school. In Russia, Germany and some parts of the U.S. police officers even have the power to handcuff and arrest truant minors on the streets during the school hours. Strict measures against truancy are usually motivated by compulsory education gaps among children and underage crime surge in big cities.

Truancy is a frequent subject of popular culture. Ferris Bueller's Day Off is about the title character's (played by Matthew Broderick) day of truancy in Chicago with his girlfriend and best friend. Truancy is also the title of a 2008 novel about a student uprising against a dictatorial educational system. The term truant can also be used to describe a child that avoids duty, although this use is less common.

== History ==
In older English, a truant or truand was any vagrant, vagabond, or shirker of duties.

The widespread legal obligation for towns and villages to provide free education did not evolve until the late-19th century and was born in such legislation as the Education (Scotland) Act 1872. Over and above the obligation within such legislation for local government to provide school-buildings and -teachers, there was also a counterpart requirement for children to actually attend an educational institution, and thus the modern legal concept of school-oriented truancy was born.

Most private schools had the concept of punishing pupils for non-attendance. This was done on a reverse principle: and schools had in principle to get the permission of parents to punish children.

== Absenteeism Effects by Cognitive Level ==
Research on the relationship between class attendance and cognitive outcomes suggests that the negative association between absenteeism and academic performance becomes more pronounced at higher levels of Bloom's Taxonomy. A case study of university students in a electronics course found that while the performance gap between attending and frequently absent students was inconsistent at the foundational "Remembering" level, where factual recall can often be achieved independently of classroom attendance. Because basic recall questions test knowledge that students can acquire through self-study or by consulting course files before the exam, attendance may offer little additional advantage at this level. This contrasts with higher-order cognitive tasks, such as "Understanding", "Applying", and "Analyzing", where the guided practice, explanation, and interactive problem-solving typically provided in class are more difficult to replicate through independent revision alone. The study reported that absent students achieved significantly lower success rates on questions requiring comprehension, application, and analysis, with the largest deficits observed at the higher-order levels.

== Slang expressions ==
There are a number of expressions in most languages which refer to truancy:

- Antigua and Barbuda: skudding.
- Argentina: ratearse.
- Bosnia and Herzegovina: escaping or eluding.
- Colombia: capar clase (avoid class with out permission)
- France: drying (class) refers to truancy. "Faire l'école buissonière" or "l'école de la vie" is also used.
- Germany: schwänzen.
- Guyana: skulking.
- Indonesia: bolos
- Ireland: dossing, mitching
- Italy: marinare marinating (school)
- Jamaica: skulling.
- Japan: futoko
- Mexico: pintearse.
- New Zealand and Australia: wagging, jigging, ditching, bludging, bunking, or skipping school.
- Netherlands and Belgium (Flanders) spijbelen, schoolziek.
- Norway: skulking
- Pakistan and India: bunking.
- Philippines: skipping or cutting class.
- Poland: wagary or wagarowanie.
- Romania: a chiuli.
- Singapore and Malaysia: pon, short for ponteng.
- South Africa: bunking, mulling, skipping or jippo
- Sweden: skolkning
- Trinidad and Tobago: breaking biche.
- United Kingdom: bunking (off), hopping the wag, skiving, wagging, kipping, mitching, twagging, or on the knock.
  - Liverpool: cutting class, doggin, playing tickie or puggin.
  - Greater Manchester: legging.
  - Wales: sagging, mitching.
  - Scotland: on the hop, doggin it, beaking or on the beak, ticking it.
- United States and Canada: (playing) hooky, ditching, dipping, skipping, cutting (class).
  - Newfoundland and Labrador: pipping off, on the pip.
  - Utah: a sluff commonly refers to a truancy.

== Punishments imposed ==
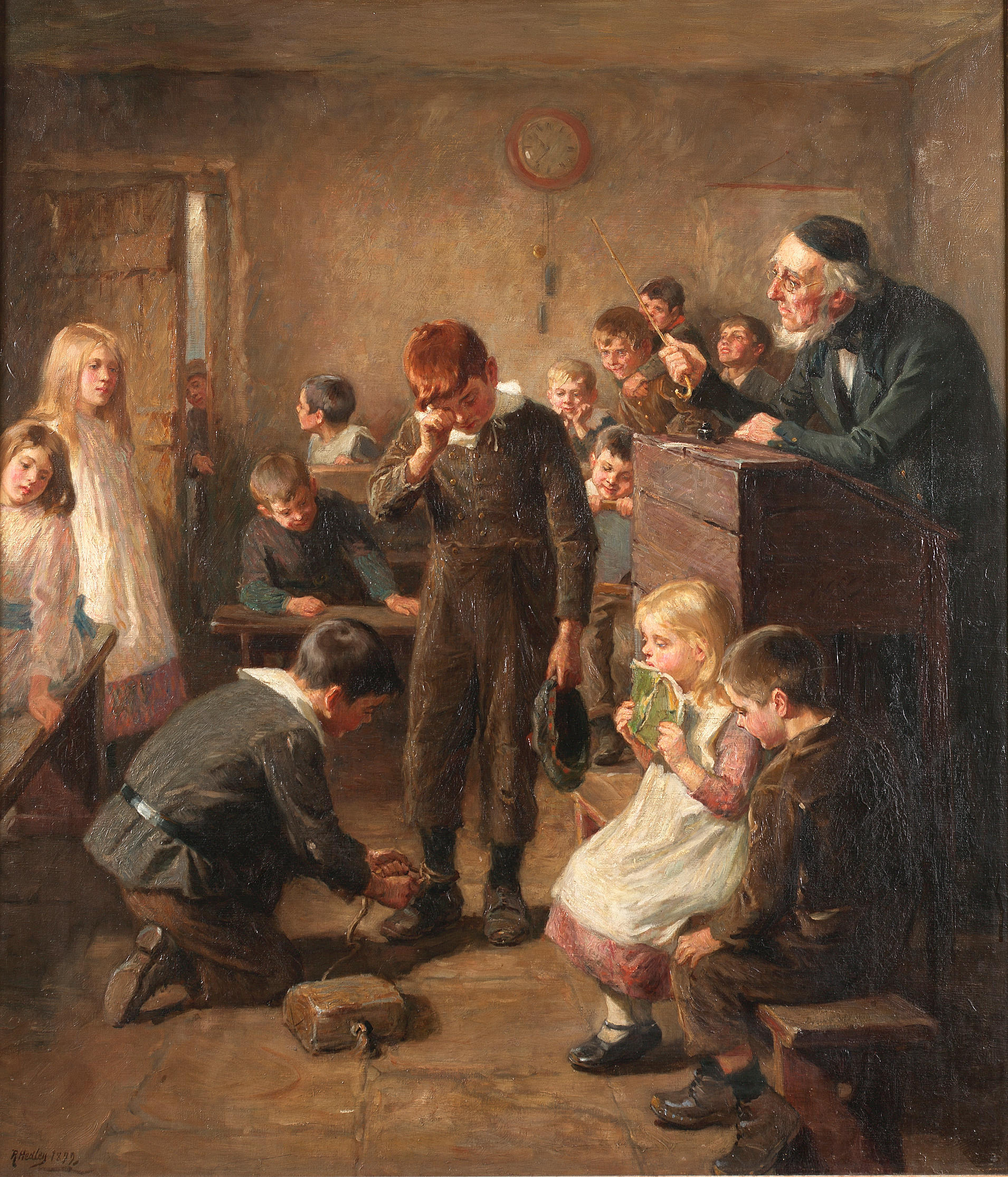
Ralph Hedley: The Truant's Log, 1899

=== Denmark ===
In Denmark, some welfare benefits may be confiscated for a period if the child does not attend school. However, not all cities use this approach to keep the children in school. Most cities watch for families who have not returned their children to school after the summer vacation because some groups exiled their children to their ethnic home countries for behavior modification. In the city of Aarhus, 155 children had not attended one week after school started. In April 2009, research among 4,000 students showed that more than one in three had been absent during the past 14 days.

=== Finland ===
In Finland, truant pupils are usually punished with detention in comprehensive schools. The police are not involved in truancy control, but teachers monitor the school and its surrounding area to avoid unauthorized absences. If a pupil is absent for a long period of time, the parents may be fined. The child will not be escorted to school, but the government may remove the child from the household if truancy continues.

=== Germany ===
In Germany, truancy is prohibited until the age of 18, and parents can be fined up to 1,250 euros or jailed if their child misses too much school. The students themselves can also be imprisoned for truancy from age 14 to 18, because the criminal responsibility age is 14 in Germany. The students older than 18 cannot be held criminally liable for truancy. The parents of a child absent from school without a legitimate excuse are notified by the school. If the parents refuse to send their child to school or are unable to control their child, local child services or social services officers may request the police to escort the child to school, and in extreme cases may petition a court to partially or completely remove child custody from the parents.

=== Israel ===
In Israel, Attendance Officers (AO) are key figures helping students cope with difficulties of adjustment in school, which can cause them to drop out of the education system altogether. AOs are employed by the local authority, as authorized by the Minister of Education, and their role is to ensure that the Compulsory Education Law is implemented in educational institutions for all 15 years of compulsory schooling. In recent years, efforts have been made to professionalize and structure the role of attendance officer. A 2016 study of the AO role found there had been a change in the focus of the AOs' work – from concentrating on students who do not regularly attend an educational framework to intervention at an earlier stage with students who are still in a formal educational framework, but are experiencing adjustment difficulties. The data over the period from 2006 to 2016 indicated a decline in the relative percentage of students not in formal education (dropouts) out of all students in the care of AOs, and that most of those in the care of an AO did attend a formal framework. At the end of the period of AO intervention, 38% of the students who were not in an educational framework when the AO began work with them had returned to a formal framework. Among those who had been in a framework at the start of work but were contending with various difficulties, almost 90% were still in the framework at the end of the intervention. Finally, the data noted the multiple difficulties facing AOs working with the Bedouin population and with students in East Jerusalem, as well as the limited resources available to them.

=== Italy ===
In Italy, compulsory education starts at six years of age and finishes at 16, but truancy constitutes a crime only for the elementary-school level.

=== Taiwan ===
Truancy is subject to an administrative fine, which may be continued until proper enrollment in the compulsory education.

=== United Kingdom ===
In England and Wales, truancy is a criminal offense for parents if the child concerned is registered at school. Truancy laws do not apply to children educated at home or otherwise under Section 7 of the Education Act 1996. Since the passage of the Criminal Justice and Court Services Act 2000, parents of persistent truants may be imprisoned for up to three months. In 2002, the first parent was imprisoned under this provision.

Since 1998, a police officer of or above the rank of superintendent may direct that for a specified time in a specified area a police officer may remove a child believed to be absent from a school without authority to that school or to another designated place. However, this is neither a power of arrest nor a power to detain, and it does not make truancy a criminal offense. A warning is issued to parents following the first instance of truancy, but for subsequent events, the parents are assessed a fine of at least £50. Some charities have highlighted an increasing prevalence of truancy among impoverished girls during menstruation, especially among girls who do not have easy access to sanitary products.

=== United States ===
In the United States, truancy regulations are generally enforced by school officials under the context of parental responsibility. New automated calling systems allow the automated notification of parents when a child is not marked present in the computer, and truancy records for many states are available for inspection online. In large schools where law enforcement officers are present, the fine for truancy can range from $250 to as much as $500. About 12,000 students were ticketed for truancy in 2008 in Los Angeles. Many states provide for the appointment of local truancy officers who have the authority to arrest habitually truant youths and bring them to their parents or to the school that they are supposed to attend. Many states also have the power to revoke a student's driver's license or permit. Where it exists, a school truancy officer is often concurrently a constable or sheriff.

Children are required by law to remain in school until the age of 16, although some states require schooling through age 18 unless an absence is formally excused by a school official or if the child has been expelled. In the 1972 case of Wisconsin v. Yoder, the Supreme Court determined that Amish children could not be placed under compulsory education laws past the eighth grade.

Children in private school or homeschooling are exempt from attending mandatory public schooling.

== Truant's Day ==
In Poland and the Faroe Islands, the first day of spring (March 21) is an unofficial occasion popular among children, who traditionally are truant on that day. In some American high schools, a "senior skip day" may be organized, often without the school's consent. The date for the skip day varies among different schools. In the Eastern United States, skip day often occurs on the last Friday before spring break or on the Monday following the school's prom.

== See also ==
- AWOL (absent without leave)
- Perfect attendance award
- School refusal
