= Leaveism =

Term coined in 2013 by Dr Ian Hesketh

Leaveism (leavism) is a term first coined in 2013 by Dr Ian Hesketh, a researcher at University of Manchester, to describe the phenomena of employees using flexitime, annual leave, rest days and other leave entitlement schemes to have time off when they are in fact too unwell to go to work. He later extended this to include occasions whereby employees took work home and/or on holiday that they could not complete in paid working hours. Hesketh's research, which centred on well-being in the UK police service, sought to identify a gap in current thinking around absenteeism and presenteeism; of which there is a plethora of academic study and commentary. The aim of his studies was to highlight that the true extent of sickness absence may be masked by the practice of leaveism, and that there may be a hidden populace experiencing significant work overload.

== Definition ==
Leaveism is the practice of:

1. employees using allocated time off such as annual leave entitlements, flexi hours banked, re-rostered rest days and so on, to take time off when they are in fact unwell;
2. employees using these leave entitlements to look after dependents, including children and/or elderly relatives;
3. employees taking work home that cannot be completed in normal working hours;
4. employees working while not at work, on leave or holiday to catch up.

== Additional research ==
In a later paper Hesketh et al. explored the relationship of leaveism with aspects of work-life balance, which he referred to as integration, and the extent to which the practice existed amongst senior police officers. Hesketh and Cooper are currently researching the second aspect of leaveism, associated with using time off such as annual leave, flexitime and other rest day allocations to look after dependents, including both children and elderly relatives; the so-called sandwich generation. The global COVID-19 pandemic highlighted this aspect as schools around the world closed down in attempts to reduce the spread of the virus. Again, the consequences of this are that employees are vulnerable to workload overload, which may, over time, have major health implications to those individuals. This may also have impacts on workplace outcomes, such as lost productivity and/or reduced performance and efficiency. This work also looks at the implications for resilience, engagement and discretionary effort which is discussed in depth in Hesketh and Cooper's book Managing Health and Wellbeing in the Public Sector. Further studies explored implications for HR and other management activities. During the pandemic Hesketh and Cooper garnered reflections from many different organisations on what had been the impact and learning practices from what was described as the largest forced workforce experiment of all time (lockdowns). These were recorded in their book Managing Workplace Health and Wellbeing During a Crises.

== Extent and factors ==
In support, research carried out by Gerich (n=930) suggested that fear of job loss or downgrading and low perceived job gratification appeared to increase the likelihood of the first element of leaveism.

In the CIPD Wellbeing Survey of 2021, the majority of respondents (84%) reported having observed ‘presenteeism’ while physically in the workplace (75%) and while working at home (77%), over the past 12 months. Further, seven in ten (70%) observed some form of ‘leaveism’, such as working outside contracted hours or working during designated holiday time, over the past 12 months. While it was reported that more organisations were taking steps to address both ‘presenteeism’ and ‘leaveism’ compared with the previous year, over two-fifths of those experiencing the reported issues did not take any action (43% for those experiencing presenteeism; 47% in the case of leaveism).

Leaveism is also cited in a July 2019 BBC publication.

=== Leaveism in police forces ===
Findings from a national survey of police officers in the UK carried out in 2016 (n= 16,841) for the Police Federation of England and Wales noted that 59% of respondents had used annual leave, flexi time, or rest days to have time away from the workplace due to the state of their physical health, and 42% had done the same due to psychological health conditions. Furthermore, the same survey reported 50% of respondents indicated that they had taken work home that could not have been completed in normal working hours, and 40% had worked while on holiday or annual leave in order to catch up with outstanding work.

On a 2017 study visit to the United States, Hesketh noted that police officers in the United States also took vacation time to mask sickness. In some cases, officers used their vacation time to avoid complaints or criticisms for working additional duties or employment outside of their police department. A culture of long hours and relatively high wages drove officers to use their own vacation time if suffering ill health to continue on additional paid work that was not as emotionally taxing or physically demanding.

=== Risk factors ===
The CIPD and Simply Health, following research with over 1,000 HR professionals representing 4.6 million employees in the UK, reported that 69% of respondents had observed leaveism over the last 12 months, and 87% of respondents agreed that technology affected employees' ability to "switch off" out of work hours (element 4 of leaveism), citing that broader public accessibility of personal cell phones and computers enabled people to take phone calls and answer emails outside of working hours.

A 2020 report by Deloitte detailed a 'deep dive' into leaveism. It modelled numerous studies conducted over recent years and highlighted the criticality of the phenomena in understanding employees workplace responses to stress and ill-health. The report concluded that younger employees were more susceptible to leaveism and, as such, required more support. The report also made recommendations about what organisations could practically do to reduce the associated risks of leaveism behaviours. Steps such as setting clear boundaries between work and personal time, enabling policy-driven culture change and encouraging people to take their annual leave allocation to switch off and relax.

=== Covid-19 ===
March 2020 saw a distinct change in leaveism behaviours, with the impact of COVID-19 striking hard. Employees isolating and shielding largely ceased to use allocated time off when unwell, element 1 of the practice. Conversely, there appears to be an enormous rise in a version of elements 3 and 4, in that employees are working incredibly long hours on Zoom, Teams, FaceTime and Skype calls without a break. Many seeing their workloads rise exponentially. The National Forum for Health and Wellbeing noted the propensity for employees to conduct back to back online meetings without a break for very long hours throughout the working day and well beyond. The impact of which inhibits exercise and healthy living generally. They also witnessed employees effectively working from bed when they were unwell. Hesketh & Cooper reflected these, and other, post COVID19 phenomena in their 2nd Edition of Wellbeing at Work. Organisations across the globe now monitor these behaviours and measure the impact on the workforce, performance and productivity. The overall objective is, of course, to engage and maintain a healthy workforce that draw meaning and purpose from their lives.

== See also ==
- Sick leave
- Absenteeism
- Presenteeism
