= Zoltán Majó =

Hungarian economist

Zoltán Majó Zoltán Majó-Petri
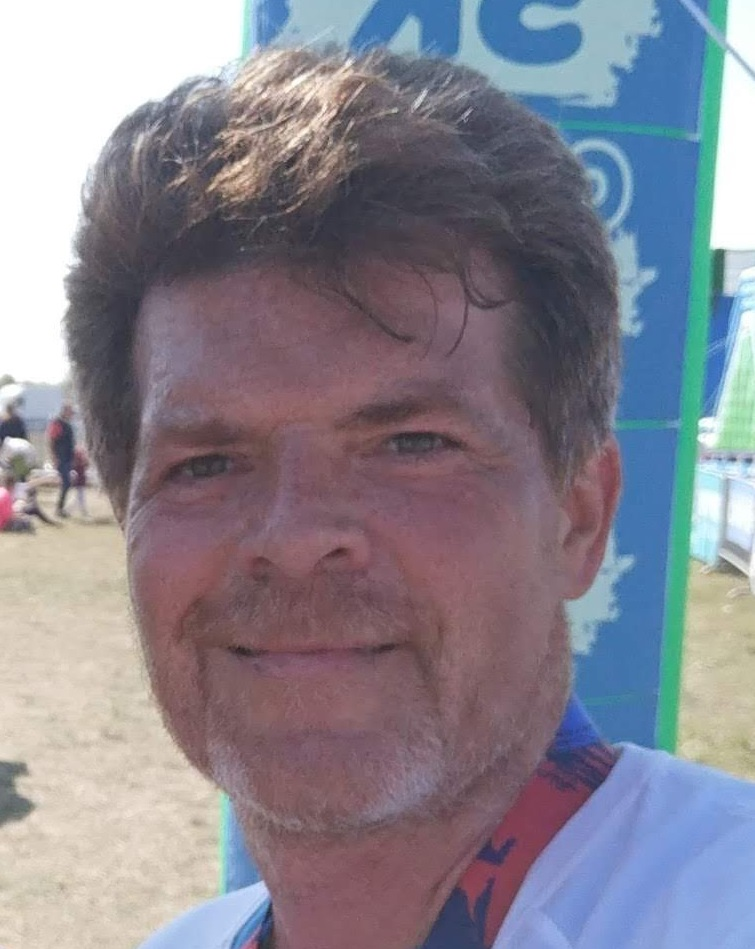
- Born: 15 December 1970 (age 55); Pitvaros, Hungary
- Citizenship: Hungarian
- Education: Attila József University (JATE), Szeged
- Known for: E-HRM; E-Recruitment; Massive open online course (MOOC); Distance Learning e-Learning e-Business sharing economy business model
- Awards: Knight's Crosses of the Order of Merit of the Republic of Hungary (2010)
- Scientific career
- Fields: Economics business and management
- Workplaces: Institute of Business Studies, Faculty of Economics, University of Szeged (SZTE), Szeged

Zoltán Majó or Zoltán Majó-Petri (Hungarian: [ˈzoltːa:n ˈmɒjo:]; born 15 December 1970) is a Hungarian economist. He is associate professor (docent, reader), former director-general for Economic and Technological Affairs of the University of Szeged and acting director of Szeged Transport Ltd.

== Early life ==
Majó was born on 15 December 1970 at Pitvaros, Makó District, Csongrád County, Hungary.

He graduated from Attila József University, Szeged in 1999. He completed his PhD degree in economics in 2008.

== Career ==
He joined the Institute of Business Studies, Faculty of Economics, University of Szeged upon graduation. He started as a senior lecturer and later became an associate professor (docent, reader).

He was awarded a fellowship to e-HRM research group, University of Twente of Enschede, Netherlands in 2006.

From 2011 until 2014 he served as Director-General for Economic and Technological Affairs of the University of Szeged. in 2016 he became an acting director of the Szeged Transport Ltd.

== Committee Memberships ==
- John von Neumann Computer science Society, member
- Public Body of the Hungarian Academy of Sciences (HAS), member

== Awards and honors ==
- Knight's Crosses of the Order of Merit of the Republic of Hungary (2010)

== Selected works ==
His works include:

=== Papers ===
His papers include:

- J Poór, S Kosár, P Fodor, V Tóth, Zoltán Majó, Z Csiba, E Huszárik: The impact of the crisis and recovery on HR and knowledge management in focus-a Hungarian-Slovakian comparison 2009, Periodica Polytechnica Social and Management Sciences 20 (1), 29–44, 2012.
- Zoltán Majó-Petri, K Kazár: The MOOC business model: The e-Business and autonomous work inflection point in higher education?Journal Association 1901 SEPIKE http://www.sepikecloud.com/ 2016 (14), 102–109, 2016.
- J Poor, A Bencsik, I Fekete, G Laszlo, Zoltán Majo: Trends and Tendencies in the Field of Improving the HR-Systems of Hungarian Public Universities, Revista De Management Company International/Review of International, 2009.

=== Books ===
- Majó, Zoltán – Dinya, L. – Imreh, Sz.- (2008): Menedzsment II. (Management). A sikeres vállalkozások. Távoktatási tananyag. SZTE GTK, Szeged.
- Imreh, Sz. – Kürtösi, Zs. – Majó, Zoltán – Vilmányi, M (2007): A menedzsment alapjai. (Introdcing to Management). Távoktatási Tananyag. SZTE GTK, Szeged.
