= Szeged Transport Ltd. =

- Native name: Szegedi Közlekedési Kft/Szegedi Közlekdési Társaság (SZKT)
- Type: Limited company
- Industry: Public transport
- Founded: 1885
- Headquarters: Szeged, Hungary,
- Key people: Zoltán Majó-Petri

The Szeged Transport Ltd. (Hungarian: Szegedi Közlekedési Kft/Szegedi Közlekdési Társaság (SZKT)) is the name of the transport company of the city of Szeged, Hungary.

== Aims ==
The Szeged Transport Ltd.'s aims are: the operation of electric track-based transport, a public pay parking system, vehicle rescue and transport, and parking.

== Brief history ==
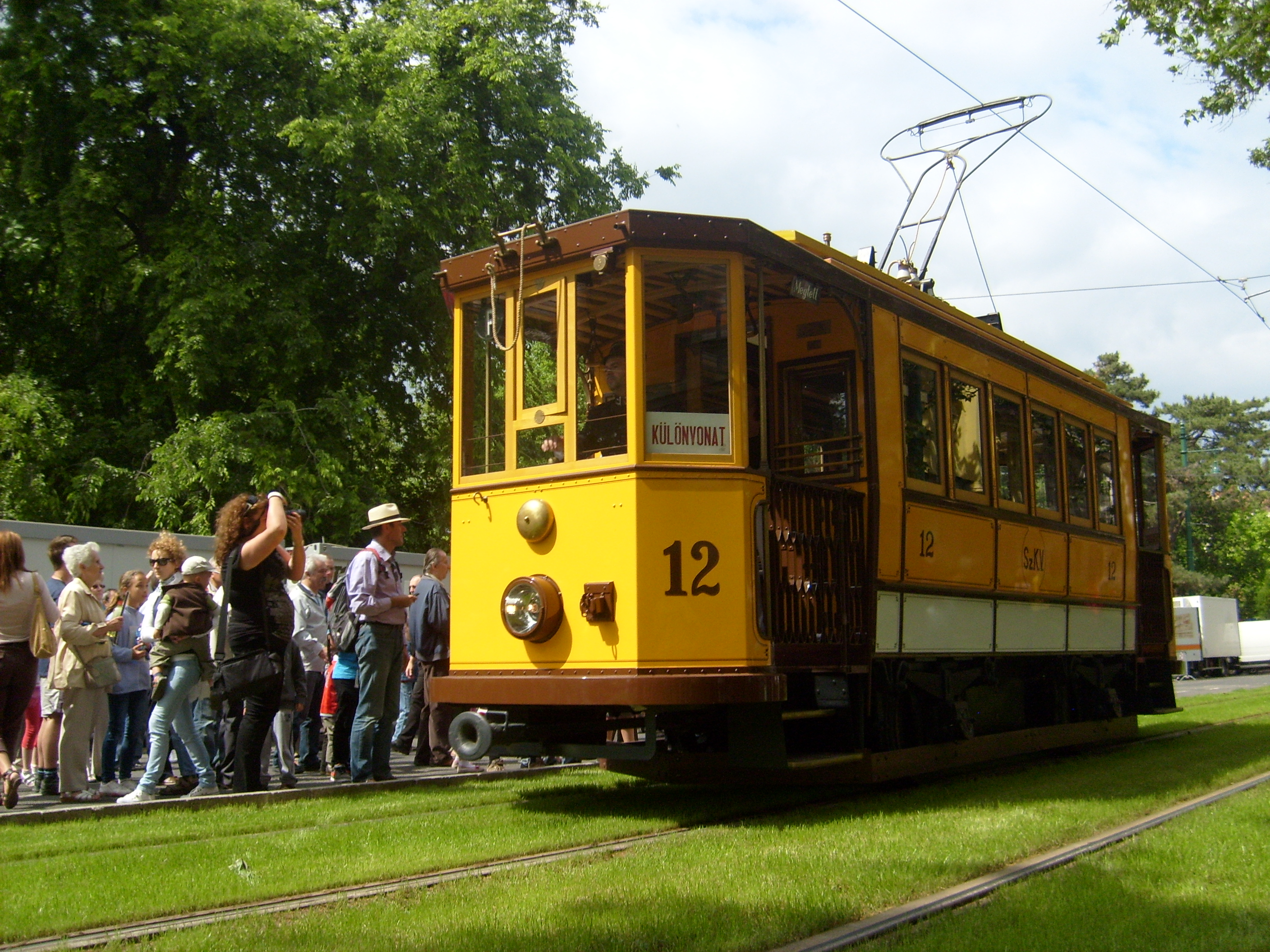
Tramcar MWG at Széchenyi square

The Szeged Transport Ltd. was established in 1885. The first tramways were launched on October 1, 1908.

After the First World War the tramway transport, both the public transport from 1920, and the freight transport from 1925, declined steadily in Szeged.

No major operations or clashes occurred in Szeged during World War II, therefore the tram network was not damaged.

The importance of the freight transport continued to decline in the 1950s, and in 1971 it ceased to exist.

On April 29, 1979, first trolleybus started service on line 5, linking Újszged, city centre and Bartók square.

Then other lines alsó were launched: line 6 in 1982, line 7 (not the same as line 7 nowadays) and line 8 in 1983 and line 9 in 1985.

After 1990 the SZKT became the property of Szeged.

== Organisation ==
=== Organizational units ===
The company operates two sectors: tramways and trolleybuses in an integrated system. However, the city's bus network does not fall under the competence of the SZKT, it is operated by MÁV Személyszállítási Zrt. as of 2024, formerly by Volánbusz.

=== Parking System ===
The SZKT operates the parking system within the city centre which was established in 1996.

There exist two (green & yellow) parking zones between which the advance parking tickets ensure interoperability.

=== Szeged Airport ===
Since 2006 the SZKT has also been operating the Szeged Airport.

The airport is located 5 kilometres (3 NM) west of the city centre.

== Vehicles ==
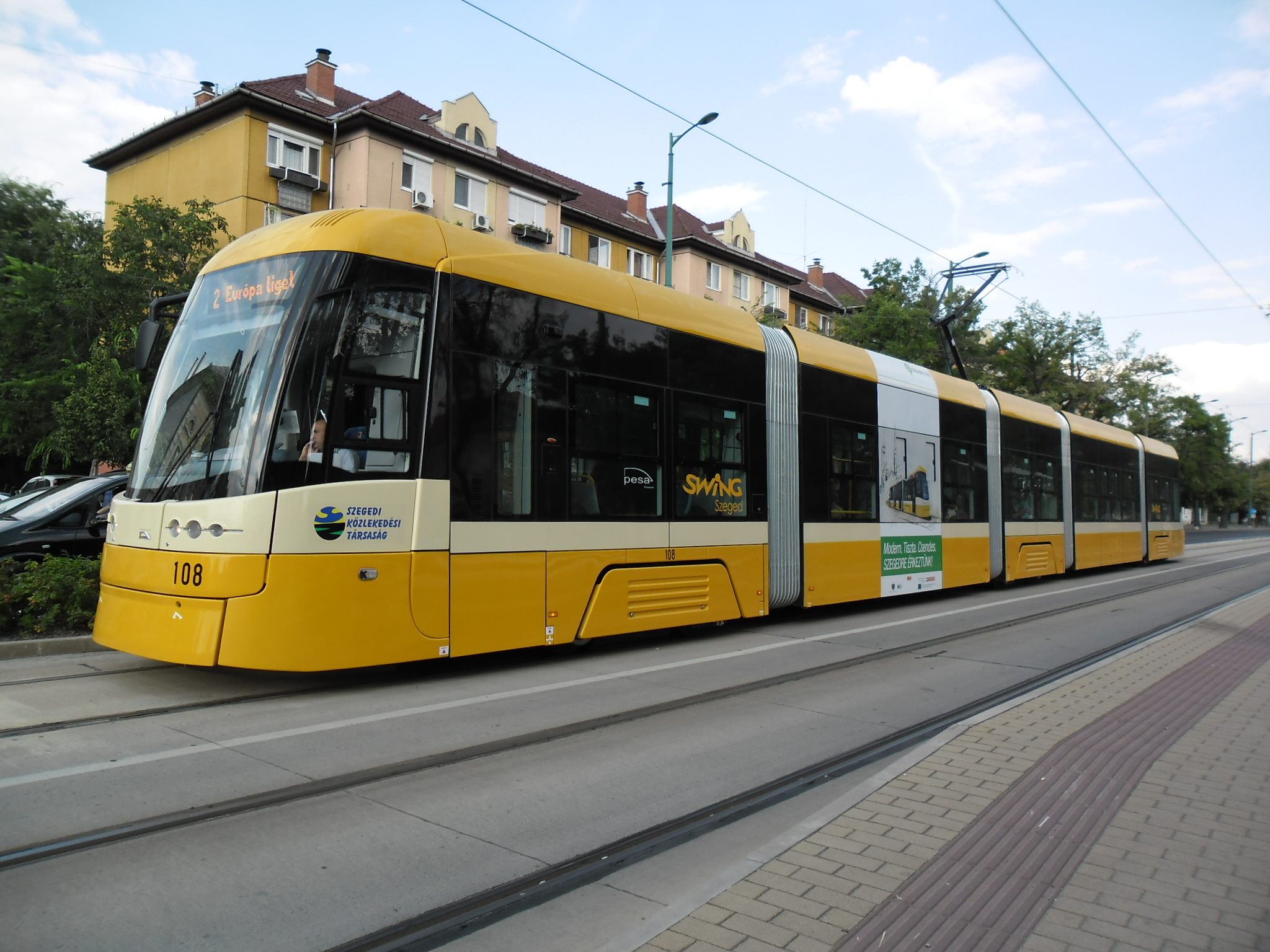
PESA 120Nb tram

=== Tramways ===
Number of pieces	Manufacturer/Type	Year of manufacture	Year of acquisition	Tracking number	Remarks
1	F1A tramcar	1897		SZ 5	ex-BKV 1520
2	Schlick FI originally BVVV F	1904		313–314	Nostalgic tramway
1	MWG	1908		12	Nostalgic tramway in 2008
1	F1A tramcar	194x		SZ 6	ex-BKV 1531
1	Diesel-electric tramcar	1953		03	ex-M III
1	FVV CSM–2	1964		609	inoperable
2	FVV CSM–4	1971		656	inoperable
2	FVV CSM–4	1977	1977	813	cast-off
18	Tatra KT4D	1985, 1990	2004–2006, 2008–2010	200–217	ex. Cottbus & Potsdam tramcars
4	Tatra TB6A2D-M additional tramcar	1989	2009–2010	950–953	ex. Rostock tramcars
13	Tatra T6A2	1996–1997	1996–1997	900–912	
9	PESA 120Nb	2011–2012	2011–2012	100–108	operated in 2012

=== Trolleybuses ===
Number of pieces	Manufacturer/Type	Year of manufacture	Tracking number	Remarks
1	ZiU-9	1986	9–153	nostalgic trolleybus
5	Škoda 14Tr	1987, 1989, 1994	T-701, T-705–T-706, T-708–T-709	
25	Škoda 15Tr	1988, 1990–1994	T-600–T-611, T-616, T-619–T-621, T-623–T-624, T-626	T-613 & T-617, 2016 cast-off
1	Ikarus 280T	1992	505	Nostalgic trolleybus
5	Škoda 21Tr	1997–1998	T-810–T-815	reconstructed
6	Mercedes-Benz Citaro O-530 TR12/TV.EU	1999	T-860–T-865	reconstructed
7	Solaris Trollino 12	2004-2007	T-870–T-878	
1	ARC Tr187/TV.EU	2010	T-660	
13	Ikarus-Škoda Tr 187.2	2013–2014	T-450–T-462	
4	Solaris Trollino 18AC	2005	T-670-T-673	
4	SOR TNS 12	2023–2024	T-400–T-403	
1	Skoda 26Tr	2012	T-879	
7	Škoda 28Tr	2008	T-770-T-776	

=== Autobuses ===
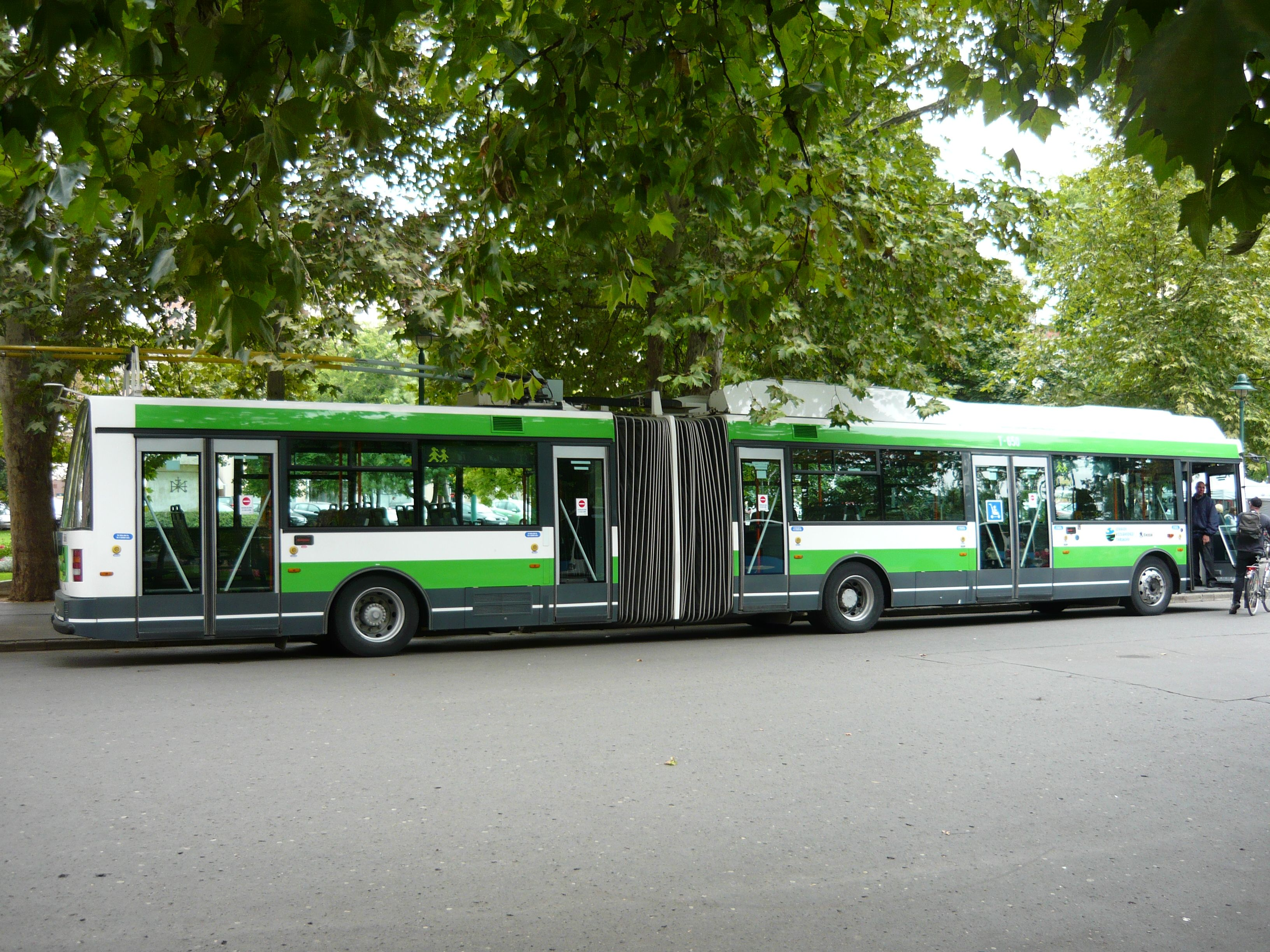
Škoda 22Tr trolleybus at Széchenyi square

Number of pieces	Manufacturer/Type	Year of manufacture
2	Škoda 21AB	
9	Mercedes-Benz Citaro	1999–2001, 2005, 2007
1	Mercedes-Benz Citaro	2007

== Statistics ==
The length of the entire network which includes the length of all connections, is 81 km. The number of stops is 171 (92 tramways and 79 trolleybuses) and the vehicle fleet contains 129 vehicles (61 tramsways, 49 trolleybuses and 19 autobuses).

=== Traffic data ===
Within a working day
	1999	2005	2008	Data for 2005 compared with 1999	Data for 2008 compared with 2005	Data for 2008 compared with 1999
Number of streets						
Tramway:	58273	60463	57421	103,76%	94,97%	98,54%
Trolleybus:	50052	50973	50838	101,84%	99,74%	101,57%
Number of departures:						
Tranway:	846	758	730	89,60%	96,31%	86,29%
Trolleybus:	767	880	949	114,73%	107,84%	123,73%

Street number distribution in 2005: SZKT: 46%, Tisza Volán: 54%

Street number distribution in 2008: SZKT: 49%, Tisza Volán: 51%

== Leadership ==
=== Acting directors ===
Gábor Dózsa	2003 – 2011
István Tibor Tóth	2011 – 2016
Zoltán Majó-Petri	2016 – present

=== Current Management ===
Dr. Majó-Petri Zoltán	acting director
Baranyi Irén	director of finance
Szőke-Tóth Ágnes	PR office manager
Náday Attila	chief engineer in charge of technology
Gombos Ferenc	chief engineer in charge of public transport
Dr. Forró Zoltán	manager in charge of parking system
Zombori Krisztián	chief engineer in charge of infrastructure
Báló Tamás	rmanager in charge of Szeged Airport
