= Absenteeism =

Habitual pattern of absence

Absenteeism is a habitual pattern of absence from a duty or obligation without good reason. Generally, absenteeism refers to unplanned absences. Absenteeism has been viewed as an indicator of poor individual performance, as well as a breach of an implicit contract between employee and employer. It is seen as a management problem, and framed in economic or quasi-economic terms. More recent scholarship seeks to understand absenteeism as an indicator of psychological, medical, or social adjustment to work.

== Workplace ==
High absenteeism in the workplace may be indicative of low employee morale, but can also be caused by workplace hazards or sick building syndrome. Measurements such as the Bradford factor, a measurement tool to analyze absenteeism which believes short and unplanned absences affect the work group more than long term absences, do not distinguish between absence for genuine illness reasons and absence for non-illness related reasons. In 2016, the UK CIPD found that the average employee had 7.5 absent days per year, which had a median annual cost of £595 per employee. Measurement methods are not exact and all encompassing, resulting in skewed results depending on variables being observed. As a result of the cost of absenteeism, employees can feel obliged to work while ill, and transmit communicable diseases to their co-workers. This leads to even greater absenteeism and reduced productivity among other workers.

Work forces often excuse absenteeism caused by medical reasons if the employee provides supporting documentation from their medical practitioner. In Poland, if employees themselves, or anyone under their care including children and elders, falls ill, sick leave can be applied.

The psychological model that discusses this is the "withdrawal model", which assumes that absenteeism represents individual withdrawal from dissatisfying working conditions. This finds empirical support in a negative association between absence and job satisfaction, in particular, the satisfaction with the work itself. Factors attributed to absence from work can include stress, family related concerns, work culture, the employees' ability to do the job, and supervisor–subordinate relationship.

Medical-based understanding of absenteeism finds support in research that links absenteeism for medical reasons with mental and behavioral disorders, diseases of the digestive system, neoplasms, and diseases of the genitourinary system. This excludes pregnancy, childbirth, and puerperium. The cost of this, in euros, is 7.43 billion per year for men and 9.66 billion for women (6.7 billion euro after taking out pregnancy, childbirth, and puerperium.) Research shows that over one trillion dollars are lost annually due to productivity shortages as a result of medical-related absenteeism. The line between psychological and medical causation is blurry, given that there are positive links between both work stress and depression, and absenteeism. Depressive tendencies may lie behind some of the absence ascribed to poor physical health, as with adoption of a "culturally approved sick role". This places the adjective "sickness" before the word "absence", and carries a burden of more proof than is usually offered.

Evidence indicates that absence is generally viewed as "mildly deviant workplace behavior." For example, people tend to hold negative stereotypes of absentees, under report their own absenteeism, and believe their own attendance record is better than that of their peers. Negative attributions about absence then bring about three outcomes: the behavior is open to social control, sensitive to social context, and is a potential source of workplace conflict.

One tactic companies use to combat unplanned absences is the notion of paying back unused sick time. Moreover, high levels of work social capital can reduce absenteeism. While a distinction can be made between types of work social capital (bounding, bridging, direct-leader-linking, and top-level-linking), relationships with the immediate leader and the top management (direct-leader-linking and top-level-linking WSC) are most important to reduce employees’ absenteeism.

Pandemic absenteeism

Absence due to illness and disability has ballooned since the pandemic. Healthier workplaces have lower absence rates. Paid leave reduces absence.

=== Management ===
Absenteeism is a habitual pattern correlated with emotional labor and personal reasoning, but there are resolutions to finding ways to alleviate the cause. Kelley, et al. (2016) says stress accounts for twelve percent of absenteeism in the workplace a year, which is a matter in which the company needs to stay in communication with the employee and work towards a solution. A great example of finding progress in absence management is forming an employee assistantship program (EAP), which is "a strategy to help workers deal with issues outside of work that employees bring to the workplace" (Quinley, 2003). This not only involves stress, but other mental health factors that employees deem worthy of attention.

==== Planned vs unplanned ====
Planned absences from work include scheduled time off, retirement, and sabbaticals. These absences cause little to no disruption to work spaces because of the time given to work around the absence.

Unplanned absence from work is defined as leave that is not planned or predictable. It includes sick time off, injured time off, special circumstances, and absence without permission. Unplanned absences indicate an important factor of the health of the workplace, including employee satisfaction and commitment. The frequency of absences and total days missed are closely linked to job satisfaction levels.

=== Sources ===
==== Bullying ====
Nearly every workplace that has a bully in charge will have elevated staff turnover and absenteeism.

==== Narcissism and psychopathy ====
According to Thomas, there tends to be a higher level of stress with people who work or interact with a narcissist, which in turn increases absenteeism and staff turnover. Boddy finds the same dynamic where there is a corporate psychopath in the organization.

== In school ==
While occasional school absenteeism may not be problematic, excessive absenteeism has shown to have a negative impact. Students with poor attendance records are found to be at a disadvantage both academically and socially. Compared to their peers, these students are more at risk of academic under-performance and early school leaving. They are also at risk of having more restricted opportunities in terms of further education and employment, and are likely to experience social and emotional problems in adulthood. Missing school can be a habit-forming behavior and can be challenging to deal with despite growing awareness of the causes of absenteeism.

Research evidence suggests that early interventions are six times more likely to be successful than those after students' non-attendance has reached the persistent stage. Equally, there is normally one initial reason, referred to as "the trigger point", for the students' non-attendance. By the time students' absences have reached the persistent stage, there are at least several more reasons used to justify the action.

There are positive and negative reinforcements regarding student absenteeism. A positive reinforcement meaning that the student will receive either more attention from their parent or guardian, or receive tangible benefits from not going to school. A negative reinforcement meaning that the student is avoiding school. Dube and Orpinas conducted a study by surveying 99 upper-elementary and middle schools, targeting students with attendance problems. Three major profiles were identified from these students. Dube and Orpinas found that 17.2 percent missed school to avoid fear, anxiety problems, or escape from social or evaluative situations; 60.6 percent missed school to gain parental attention or tangible benefits; and 22.2 percent had no profile. All three groups significantly differed in mean scores for behavioral difficulties. Children who fit within multiple profiles had the highest level of behavioral problems, and children in the no-profile group had the lowest. Children with multiple profiles had higher mean scores on frequency of victimization and total number of traumatic or stressful events than did those in the other groups.

Although there are many theories to treating absenteeism, there is no universal treatment. There is however, a step by step process identified by Evie Bald, to manage absenteeism. This process includes identifying chronic absenteeism, identifying the reasoning behind the absences, work with families to address issues, and offer positive reinforcements if necessary.

== See also ==
- Bartleby, the Scrivener
- Tardiness
