= Bradford Factor =

Measure of worker absenteeism

The Bradford Factor or Bradford Formula is used in human resource management as a means of measuring worker absenteeism. The theory is that short, frequent, and unplanned absences are more disruptive than longer absences. According to the Chartered Institute of Personnel and Development the term was coined due to its supposed connection with research undertaken by the Bradford University School of Management in the 1980s. According to the Financial Times, "HR folklore" has attributed its origins to a pharmaceuticals firm whose managers attended a seminar at Bradford Management School. Bradford University has not confirmed that the Bradford Factor originated there.

== Calculation ==
The Bradford Factor is calculated as follows:

S² × D

where:

- S is the total number of spells (instances) of absence of an individual over a set period
- D is the total number of days of absence of that individual over the same set period

The 'set period' is typically set as a rolling 52-week period.

For example, this is how 10 days absence could be shown:

- 1 instance of absence with a duration of ten days (1 × 1 × 10) = 10 points
- 2 instances of absence, each of five days (2 × 2 × 10) = 40 points
- 5 instances of absence, each of two days (5 × 5 × 10) = 250 points
- 10 instances of absence, each of one day (10 × 10 × 10) = 1000 points

For comparison, a single instance of absence with a duration of one working year is approximately 240 points (1 × 1 × 240).

In May 2001, HM Prison Service began using the Bradford Formula to identify staff with high absenteeism due to illness. The Bradford Formula is used to calculate an "attendance score".

== Limitations ==
The factor was originally designed for use as part of the overall investigation and management of absenteeism. In contrast, if used as part of a very limited approach to address absence or by setting unrealistically low trigger scores it was considered short-sighted, unlikely to be successful and could lead to staff disaffection and grievances. The formula does not consider certain disabilities which may result in short term absences, such as epilepsy and asthma, or serious but recoverable illnesses such as cancer. Similarly, it does not account for autoimmune diseases in which the occurrence of bouts of illness can be unpredictable. The use of the Bradford Factor often provokes heated debate. The British trade union Unison argues that the Bradford Factor tends to encourage presenteeism, with workers fearing disciplinary action coming to work with transmissible illnesses and risking spreading disease to others.
