= Truancy (novel) =

2008 novel by Isamu Fukui

- Cover Art
- Author: Isamu Fukui
- Cover artist: JupiterImages
- Language: English
- Genre: Dystopian, Science fiction
- Publisher: Tor Books
- Publication date: March 4, 2008
- Publication place: United States
- Media type: Print (hardcover)
- Pages: 432
- ISBN: 978-0-7653-1767-4
- OCLC: 166378205
- LC Class: PZ7.F951538 Tru 2008
- Preceded by: Truancy Origins
- Followed by: Truancy City

Truancy is a dystopian novel written by Isamu Fukui, a New York City student in Stuyvesant High School, when he was 15 years old. Set in a totalitarian city ruled by its Mayor and Educators, it follows the story of a fifteen-year-old student named Tack, and a student rebellion calling itself the Truancy. The story takes a critical look at the institution of school, and is dedicated "to everyone that has ever suffered in the name of education".

== Synopsis ==
The book starts out with 15-year old Tack trying to survive a ruthless high school where any infraction means expulsion, and expulsion means death. After a run in with some bullies, Tack escapes into abandoned District 19, where he meets Umasi. Umasi pays Tack to do menial chores like sorting through salt and pepper, and trains him in several fighting ways. On a routine inspection of Tack's school, his little sister Suzie takes the blame for her friend Melissa for throwing a stink bomb at the Disciplinary Officer. Suzie is expelled on the spot and is taken away from the school. Tack immediately follows and leaves the school just in time to see a firebomb fly into the car killing Suzie and the Disciplinary Officer. As he holds his sister's dead body, he sees the person who killed Suzie, calling her "collateral damage". Tack runs away and passes out on a dock. When he wakes up he is found by two members of the Truancy, which is a group of children trying to overthrow the City. He joins the Truancy under the name Takan, thinking that he can find the one who killed Suzie if he does.

He eventually finds Suzie's killer, whose name is Zyid, but he is the leader of the Truancy. Tack sympathizes with the Truancy and feels he cannot kill their leader. He eventually replaces a girl named Noni as Zyid's favorite because of his fighting skills taught by Umasi. During his time with Zyid, he feels wary of his killing and Zyid's brutality to both traitors and enemies. Tack eventually falls in love with Noni. The Mayor hires one of Umasi's former pupils named Edward and appoints him as the Chief Enforcer and leader of the "student Militia", which are students who were promised instant graduation if they fought the Truancy. Zyid confronts Umasi and tells him that he must correct his mistake and kill Edward. Umasi doesn't want to, as he has become a pacifist and has never killed before. Umasi eventually agrees to do it, and finds and kills Edward that night.

The next day, Zyid tells Tack that the war will end that night, and asks Tack to join him to "plead their case to the city" by breaking into a radio tower and setting a tape to loop constantly. After they do this, Zyid reveals that he knows who Tack is and says "killing me won't bring her back". They agree to a duel to the death. Right before the duel, Zyid reveals that his real name is Zen, his brother is Umasi, and both of them are the adoptive twin sons of the Mayor. What follows is a lengthy duel between the two that gets interrupted several times. Tack eventually wins by kicking Zyid off of the top of his old school. Umasi comes and stays with Zyid as he dies. Zyid asks Umasi to promise to help Tack.

The story ends with Tack becoming the leader of the Truancy under the name Takan.

== Publication details ==
- ISBN 978-0-7653-1767-4
- ISBN 0-7653-1767-2

== Translations ==
- Spanish: War Boys, 2007.
- Italian: Student Guerilla, 2007.
