= Perfect attendance award =

Award given to students present for every school day

A perfect attendance award is traditionally given at the end of the school year in U.S. schools to honor students who were present for every day of school during that year, or in some cases across multiple years. Supporters believe that the award promotes education by encouraging students to attend class.

Offering a perfect attendance award may promote presenteeism and hurt public health by encouraging students to attend class when sick with a potentially contagious illness, while punishing those who decide to stay home to recover. The US Centers for Disease Control and Prevention discourages schools from offering awards or other incentives to promote school attendance by students who are sick or potentially contagious.

== Criticism and health concerns ==
Critics argue that the perfect attendance award incentivizes students to come to school even when they are ill, which can lead to the spread of contagious diseases. Presenteeism, the act of attending work or school while sick, can negatively impact both the health of the individual and the community. Research has shown that such practices can exacerbate public health issues, especially during flu season or other outbreaks of contagious illnesses.
