= Absence management =

Human Resource Specialty

Absence management, also known as leave management, is a combination of employer policies, procedures, or programs designed to handle employee leaves of absence and minimize the impact of those absences on the employer. Absence management programs aim to maximize productivity by supporting an employee from initial absence through return-to-work and stay-at-work plans.

In 2015, the CDC Foundation estimated that physical injury or illness costs US employers $225.8 billion annually. The Centers for Disease Control (CDC) estimated that depression cost employers an additional $44 billion annually. The reasons and costs for employee absence have been well studied for decades. Since the early 2000s studies have increasingly consider the reasons and costs for presenteeism which occurs when workers who are not fully productive still attend work. Injury, illness, stress, anxiety, or depression can diminish productivity, imposing increased costs on the employer and potentially impacting others in the workforce.

To balance the costs of absence with the health and well-being of the workforce, companies rely on absence management programs to explicitly track and manage the cause and costs of absenteeism.

== Absence management legislation (US) ==
The United States lags other industrialized countries when it comes to federally mandated paid leave including parental leave for the birth or adoption of a child, employee illness, or to care for a sick child, spouse, or another close relative. The United States is one of seven countries in the world that does not guarantee paid maternity leave, along with Marshall Islands, Micronesia, Nauru, Palau, Papua New Guinea, and Suriname. The United States also lags behind other industrialized countries when it comes to federally mandated paid vacation time. Paid holiday entitlement in the European Union is set at a minimum of four weeks (20 days) per year, exclusive of bank holidays. The US Fair Labor Standards Act (FLSA) of 1938, last amended in 2009, doesn't mandate any paid vacation, instead stating that these matters are left to an agreement between employer and employee.

A 2018 study by Project: Time Off showed that US workers left 662 million vacation days unused. The study cited fear — fear of missing out, fear of returning to a pile of work, fear of being seen as under-performing, and fear of being seen as replaceable — as the most common reason why workers did not use their vacation time.

The push for federally mandated standards for paid leave laws has been ongoing for over 100 years. As a result, there is a complex patchwork of federal, state, and local laws which offer workers protection for unpaid leave, based on a variety of different factors. This patchwork of laws makes it increasingly difficult for employers to remain in compliance.

The federal laws that impact absence management include:

- The Pregnancy Discrimination Act of 1978
- The Americans with Disabilities Act (ADA) was signed into law on July 26, 1990
- The Family and Medical Leave Act (FMLA) was passed in 1993
- The Uniformed Services Employment and Reemployment Rights Act (USERRA) of 1994
- The ADA Amendments Act (ADAAA) of 2008

In the absence of a unifying federal law requiring paid family and medical leave, many states and municipalities are passing their own leave laws. As of 2021, nine states and the District of Columbia had active paid family leave programs with another three states set to implement newly passed laws. In 2019, an estimated 30 municipalities require paid sick leave. With these distinct laws, leave duration, accrual, use, and reporting requirements vary, making compliance difficult for employers.

== Absence management in the pandemic era ==
At the onset of the COVID-19 pandemic, American workers were instructed to stay home. Service sector workers, comprising nearly 20% of the American workforce, were deemed essential workers and asked to continue working, risking exposure to a highly contagious and potentially lethal disease. Workers in these jobs earn very low wages.55% of them had no paid sick leave, creating financial insecurity for those that may miss work. Paid sick leave allows those who are sick to recover and protects those who are healthy against the spread of illness. Then there were those who considered “workations” — if they were remote, why not work from a vacation destination without using their PTO? Finally, many people chose not to use their PTO at all, resulting in employers seeing unused time balloon to unhealthy levels.

The federal government passed the Families First Coronavirus Response Act (FFCRA), which went into effect on April 1, 2020. FFCRA reimbursed private employers with fewer than 500 employees with tax credits for the cost of providing paid sick leave and expanded family and medical leave for special reasons related to COVID-19. These temporary rules expired on December 31, 2020.

According to Mercer (US) Inc., a human resource consulting firm, publication, “States, Cities Tackle COVID-19 Paid Leave. Including OSHA’s ETS Paid Leave Requirements”, some states and local authorities implemented new paid leave requirements while others modified existing laws to accommodate employees' needs. In a July 2021 revision, the authors went on to state:

State and local activity on paid leave issues continue to evolve. The expired federal emergency paid sick and family leave requirements under the Families First Coronavirus Response Act (FFCRA) (Pub. L. No. 116-127) — applicable only to employers with fewer than 500 employees — did not preempt any state or local paid leave mandates but did provide corresponding tax credits to an employer for qualified wages provided for the required paid leave. Many state and local emergency leave laws were enacted to cover larger employers and employees exempt from the federal law but without the corresponding tax credits. In some cases, the state/local requirement covers employers of all sizes. The Consolidated Appropriations Act of 2021 (Pub. L. No. 116-260) extended the corresponding tax credits for employers subject to the FFCRA that voluntarily continued to provide any unused paid FFCRA leave through March 31, 2021. The American Rescue Plan Act (ARPA) (Pub. L. No. 117-2), effective April 1, 2021, enhanced the tax credits for voluntarily provided FFCRA-qualifying paid leave through Sept. 30, 2021.

The publication goes on to discuss 32 distinct state, city, or county emergency paid leave benefits and an additional 13 COVID-19 guidance recommendations for existing paid leave laws.

Many of the country's largest employers, such as Walmart, Amazon, and Starbucks took it upon themselves to update their policies. Walmart, for example, began offering its hourly associated up to two weeks at 100% salary plus partial pay for up to 26 weeks with medical certification. The company would also allow for paid leave to recover from the side effects of a COVID-19 vaccine.

On November 5, 2021, the Occupational Safety and Health Administration (OSHA) published a mandatory workplace safety rule including paid leave for employees to receive a COVID-19 vaccination plus time to recover from any vaccine side effects. The rule, covering employers with more than 100 employees would have required vaccination or regular testing but was struck down in court in January 2022, before it went into full effect. The back and forth on rules like these had employers constantly scrambling to keep up.

== Options for implementing an absence management program ==
In 2021, 55 percent of surveyed companies cited compliance as a top priority. Employers are placing a new strategic focus on absence management, creating more formal programs and policies. The number of companies with formal programs is expected to grow from 50 percent to 63 percent within two years. Programs can be managed internally (in-sourcing), managed through a combination of internal resources and an external partner (co-sourcing), or managed by a third-party administrator or insurance carrier (outsourcing). There are also a growing number of technology solutions to help regardless of the model chosen.

In-sourced leave and absence management programs rely on internal benefits-related or HR staff for the intake of new claims and overseeing all leave management activities in coordination with short-term disability and workers’ compensation claims. The employer is responsible for tracking, reporting, and compliance with all laws and regulations. Technology solutions are prevalent for employers who run their own programs, especially for larger programs. 60% of employers with 5,000+ employees and 80% of companies with 20,000 employees rely on a technology solution. Technology capabilities also increase with employer size, with smaller companies relying on payroll systems, mid-sized employers using HRIS systems, and large employers investing in leave management software.

In a co-sourced model, an employer partners with an external vendor, keeping some elements of the program internally while relying on the vendor for additional expertise. A company may rely on a vendor's technology platform while maintaining internal staff for leave intake and management. This model allows an employer to manage the process in-house using a more sophisticated technology platform than they would likely not have access to on their own. The vendor is responsible for maintaining the platform, making real-time updates to the system. This solution tends to result in better compliance and consistency than in-sourced programs, however, the employee experience is still dependent on front-line managers and/or in-house leave management teams. Third-party software, for example, can help HR professionals track a variety of leaves, return-to-work dates, and can automate a lot of mundane tasks.

Outsourcing relies exclusively on a partner to run the entire program. Many HR and insurance organizations offer these services.

== See also ==
- Society for Human Resource Management (SHRM)
- Job Accommodation Network (JAN)
- List of Human Resource Management Associations
- Disability Management Employer Coalition (DMEC)
