= Presenteeism =

Act or culture of working while sick

Presenteeism or working while sick is the act or culture of employees continuing to work as a performative measure, despite having reduced productivity levels or negative consequences. Reduced productivity during presenteeism is often due to illness, injury, exhaustion, or other conditions, but presenteeism can also describe working while contagiously sick, which has the added risk of creating a workplace epidemic.

Many different motives can lead to presenteeism. An employee may come to work because they simply need the money and cannot afford to take time off due to illness. Doctors may attend work while sick due to feelings of being irreplaceable. Additionally, one could go to work due to a love and devotion to the job; in this case, it could be considered an act of organizational citizenship and inspire admiration from colleagues. Other reasons include feeling that career prospects may be damaged if they take time off, and an expectation of presence driven from management.

Presenteeism is ingrained in the culture of certain industries and regions of the world. In Singapore and other South Asian and South East Asian countries, it is a common practice for employees to stay in the office even after their work is done, waiting until their boss leaves. Jobs with large workloads are often associated with presenteeism. Workaholics and people who base their self-esteem on performance typically exhibit higher levels of presenteeism.

While the contrasting subject of absenteeism has historically received extensive attention in the management sciences, presenteeism has only been studied recently.

== Construct validity ==
Scholars have provided various descriptions of the concept. For instance, Simpson claimed that presenteeism is "the tendency to stay at work beyond the time needed for effective performance on the job." Aronsson, Gustafsson, and Dallner wrote that it means attending work even when one feels unhealthy. In a recent review of the literature, Johns highlighted the lack of agreement between the many definitions. The author claimed that many of the definitions lack utility and that the term is most often defined as going to work while ill. He further noted that definitions of presenteeism, which are centered on attending work while sick, have received more evidence of construct validity. In other words, when defined as coming to work while sick, presenteeism seems to relate more to logical outcome variables and correlates.

Simply viewing presenteeism as a negative act that leads to productivity loss and decreased health may be restricting potential analysis of the construct.

== Relationship with absenteeism ==
In some cases, scholars relate presenteeism to absenteeism, which is the tendency not to show up for scheduled work. Furthermore, Johns described the notion that some believe that factors that reduce absenteeism will increase presenteeism. He stated, however, that this is plausible but not always the case because he pointed out that Aronsson et al. found high rates of presenteeism in industries where absenteeism was also high.

Additionally, research that examines absenteeism is at times used to draw conclusions about presenteeism. For example, Virtanen, Kivimaki, Elovainio, Vahtera, and Ferrie found that employees exhibited much higher rates of absenteeism once they became permanent workers. The authors thought that this increase could have been due to decreases in the preexisting levels of presenteeism. However, they did not directly measure presenteeism. Commenting on such research behavior, Johns said in his review of the literature that researchers should not infer presenteeism from absenteeism data. Instead, the author noted that both constructs should be measured at the same time.

== Antecedents ==
=== Temporary and permanent employment ===
Temporary and permanent employment are often considered when examining the antecedents of presenteeism. More specifically, researchers have studied these positions with the thought that lack of job security will cause those who do not have permanent positions to come to work more often even if they are sick. This hypothesis, however, has not received complete support. Aronsson et al. discovered that permanent employees were more prone to presenteeism than those in more seasonal positions. In contrast, Aronsson and Gustafson found no effect of job type. Furthermore, Heponiemi et al. found that fixed-term employees as opposed to permanent employees were less likely to report working while ill, and the work of Bockerman and Laukkanen supported this finding. Based on these inconclusive results, Johns called for researchers to reconsider the job insecurity hypothesis.

=== Occupations and work environments ===
Individuals working in certain occupations may be more prone to presenteeism. In a study in Sweden, Aronsson et al. found higher rates of presenteeism in organizations whose function is to provide welfare and teaching services. The authors pointed out that these employees often worked with clients in more vulnerable populations, such as the elderly. Outside of education and healthcare, most studied occupations had lower rates of presenteeism; however, the results did suggest that higher-risk jobs, which had more physical workload and stress, saw increased levels of presenteeism.

Certain work environments may stimulate presenteeism. To explore this topic, Dew, Keefe, and Small qualitatively examined a private hospital, a large public hospital, and a small factory. In the private hospital, there was little pressure from management to exhibit presenteeism; however, a sense of family seemed to exist between the staff, and a strong loyalty to coworkers pushed employees to come to work while unhealthy. The public hospital had a distant management, but presenteeism was fostered by "loyalty to professional image, colleagues, and the institution as a whole." Finally, in the factory, there was strong pressure from management for employees to exhibit presenteeism. Furthermore, workers often had few other employment options, which often resulted in increased presenteeism.

=== Ease of replacement ===
The ease with which one can be replaced on the job also affects levels of presenteeism. Specifically, if one feels that they cannot be replaced, that individual is more prone to attend work while sick. Doctors are often examined in this regard. For example, Jena et al. studied residents in training and noted high rates of presenteeism, which they concluded were the result of feeling irreplaceable. Further extending the examination of the medical field, McKevitt, Morgan, Dundas, and Holland studied hundreds of healthcare professionals and found that more than 80 percent of respondents had worked while ill. Individuals listed some of the reasons they had not taken sick days, and many cited the fact that they felt large pressure to work. In some cases, general practitioners did not want to burden their partners, and many felt a strong commitment to the job that prevented them from taking sick leave.

=== Workloads and job demands ===
Jobs that have large workloads and many demands are often associated with higher levels of presenteeism. Caverely, Cunningham, and Macgregor studied Canadian firms and noted that presenteeism was often not the result of job insecurity. Instead individuals felt they had to come to work while ill or injured because they believed they had high workloads, many deadlines, and often very little backup support. Complementing this finding, McKevitt et al. also found that individuals feared their work would pile up if they did not go to their job. Moreover, Demerouti, Le Blanc, Bakker, Schaufeli, and Hox examined job demands and found that they had a positive relationship with presenteeism. In the case of this study, the authors defined job demands as aspects of the job that require physical and/or psychological effort.

Forced overtime, heavy workloads, and frenetic work paces give rise to debilitating repetitive stress injuries, on-the-job accidents, over-exposure to toxic substances, and other dangerous work conditions. Some studies are beginning to show the costs of compulsory overwork. Reg Williams and Patricia Strasser, professors of nursing at the University of Michigan, estimated in the journal of the American Association of Occupational Health Nurses that the total cost of depression at work was as high as $44 billion. They pointed out that healthcare workers have focused much attention on the workplace risk factors for heart disease, cancer, obesity, and other illnesses, but little emphasis on the risk factors for depression, stress, negative changes in personal life, and difficulties in interpersonal relationships.

=== Workaholism ===
Those who exhibit workaholism tend to demonstrate higher levels of presenteeism. As defined by Schaufeli, Bakker, van der Heijden, and Prins, workaholics tend to work excessively and compulsively, and they are internally motivated to work to an excessive extent. In addition to their high levels of presenteeism, Schaufeli et al. discovered that workaholics also displayed the highest burnout and lowest happiness levels relative to other groups who were not defined as workaholics.

=== Performance-based self-esteem ===
Performance-based self-esteem (PBSE) has also been considered another antecedent of presenteeism. This term describes the idea that individuals' self-esteem may depend on their performance. Employees who demonstrate high levels of this construct have to prove their worthwhileness on the job. Love et al. found that PBSE positively predicted presenteeism; however, the authors also discovered that the relationship between PBSE and presenteeism was strengthened when workers experienced high physical and psychological work demands. This finding suggested that demanding work environments could interact with employees' overambitious work styles, which could result in over-performance and increased levels of presenteeism.

=== Health factors ===
Certain health factors serve as risk factors for presenteeism as opposed to absenteeism. Boles, Pelletier, and Lynch examined a variety of emotional and physical health symptoms and noted that the odds of reporting presenteeism were largest for those with high stress compared to those without stress. Those with poor diet and less emotional fulfillment also reported higher levels of presenteeism than those without these conditions. The researchers noted that individuals with diabetes tended to report higher levels of absenteeism as opposed to those without the condition. Individuals who partook in no physical activity were more prone to report higher levels of both absenteeism and presenteeism compared to those who took part in some physical activity.

== Consequences ==
=== Productivity loss ===
One consequence of presenteeism is productivity loss, and scholars have attempted to estimate these productivity numbers. While examining productivity decrements, however, it is implied that losses are measured relative to not having a particular sickness or health issue. Furthermore, in comparison to being absent from a job, those exhibiting presenteeism may be far more productive. Nonetheless, a large study by Goetzel et al. estimated that on average in the United States, an employee's presenteeism costs or lost on-the-job productivity are approximately $255. Furthermore, the authors concluded that of all the health related costs faced by employers, one fifth to three fifths of those expenses could be attributable to on-the-job productivity losses. Complementing that study, Schultz and Edington provided a detailed review of the effects of certain health conditions on productivity. These authors examined conditions such as allergies, arthritis, chronic pain, diabetes, and mental health disorders. The studies in the review showed, for example, that increases in pollen (a common allergen) are associated with decreased performance. Moreover, Schultz and Edington noted that chronic pain had to be studied more thoroughly to better understand its effects on productivity.

=== Poor health and exhaustion ===
Exhaustion and future poor health are often other consequences of presenteeism. For example, Bergstrom, Bodin, Hagberg, Aronsson, and Josephson found that sickness presenteeism was a risk factor for future sick leave. Furthermore, in their study of job demands and presenteeism, Demerouti et al. found that presenteeism resulted in increased exhaustion.

Presenteeism can also have an effect on occupational injuries for workers. A 2012 study from the National Institute for Occupational Safety and Health showed that workers with access to paid sick leave were 28% less likely overall to sustain nonfatal injuries than workers without access to paid sick leave.

=== Workplace epidemics ===
In the case of an infectious disease such as influenza, a culture of presenteeism will inevitably also lead to further infections throughout the workforce, compounding the ill-effects and leading to a much wider problem. In a 2014 survey by Canada Life Insurance, over 80% of respondents stated that they had become ill as a result of an infection contracted in the workplace.

== Measurement and impact on productivity ==
Scholars have often measured presenteeism in terms of how often an individual attends work while unhealthy. For instance, Aronsson et al. asked participants to what extent over the past year they had gone to work despite feeling they should have taken sick leave. Respondents could choose from never, once, between two and 5 times, and more than 5 times. Other researchers have examined the frequency of presenteeism by asking participants a similar question. The responses, however, were on a scale of "spells of one day presenteeism, spells of 2-4 day presenteeism, and spells of 5 day or more presenteeism."

Aside from measuring the frequency of presenteeism, scholars often look to measure the effects of poor health on job productivity. The Work Limitations Questionnaire (WLQ) is often used to perform this task. With 25 items, it examines the extent to which respondents can handle time, physical, mental-interpersonal, and output demands. Additionally, the Stanford Presenteeism Scale seeks to determine the effects of health on productivity. It measures participants' abilities to concentrate and perform work despite having a primary health problem. Using six items, respondents determine the extent to which they agree with statements that describe how their health condition may or may not affect their work. The scale measures two factors that the authors labeled as completing work and avoiding distraction. Finally, another measure often used is the World Health Organization's Health and Work Performance Questionnaire (HPQ). This self-report measure acquires information about respondents' health conditions and has them provide perceptions of their job performance. The WLQ and HPQ have become the two most popular instruments; however, there are other measures that have been created to estimate the effects of health on productivity.

== Implications for practice ==
Given the prominence and costs of presenteeism, scholars have suggested a variety of courses of action for employers. Companies should implement wellness programs for their employees aimed at increasing health and productivity. These organizations, however, must be aware that the effects of these programs may have an immediate impact on presenteeism as opposed to simply absenteeism. Firms must be cognizant of this fact when evaluating the effectiveness of their programs. Complementing this suggestion, Schultz and Edington wrote that employees must receive effective health education so they can better manage their health. They also commented that employers need to consider the health of workers who are low risk along with those who have high-risk health conditions. In the United States, one other proposed response has been to require that paid sick and family leave be provided to all workers. In November 2006, San Francisco became the first jurisdiction to pass such a law.

== Future directions and research ==
While progress has been made in regards to understanding presenteeism, many possible topics of inquiry still remain. In his literature review, Johns said that presenteeism had to be related to other constructs such as work attitudes and personality.

== See also ==
- Absenteeism
- Karoshi
- Leaveism
- Occupational safety and health
- Occupational burnout
- Overwork
- Perfect attendance award
- Self-esteem
- Sick leave
- Job strain
- Work–life balance
- Workaholic
- Workism
- Workload
- Occupational stress
