= E-HRM =

Electronic human resource management

E-HRM is the planning, implementation and application of information technology for both networking and supporting at least two individual or collective actors in their shared performing of HR activities.

E-HRM is not same as HRIS (Human resource information system) which refers to ICT systems used within HR departments. Nor is it the same as V-HRM or Virtual HRM - which is defined by Lepak and Snell as "...a network-based structure built on partnerships and typically mediated by information technologies to help the organization acquire, develop, and deploy intellectual capital."

E-HRM is in essence the devolution of HR functions to management and employees. They access these functions typically via intranet or other web-technology channels. The empowerment of managers and employees to perform certain chosen HR functions relieves the HR department of these tasks, allowing HR staff to focus less on the operational and more on the strategic elements of HR, and allowing organizations to lower HR department staffing levels as the administrative burden is lightened. It is anticipated that, as E-HRM develops and becomes more entrenched in business culture, these changes will become more apparent, but they have yet to be manifested to a significant degree. A 2007 CIPD survey states that "The initial research indicates that much-commented-on development such as shared services, outsourcing and e-HR have had relatively little impact on costs or staff numbers".

== Roles ==
The role of E-HRM is significant in modern HR practices. Traditional HRM encompasses various functions such as recruitment, selection, development, compensation, retention, evaluation, and promotion of personnel within an organization. These functions can largely be adapted to the virtual. However, with the emergence of E-HRM and virtual operations in the business world, the HR profession faces a significant challenge.

E-HRM, often seen as the modern counterpart of HRM, bears resemblances to various HR management functions. These functions encompass the planning for an organization's requirements, the acquisition of human resources, the improvement of individual and organizational performance, the provision of employee rewards, and the maintenance of human resources.

Leveraging E-HRM technology functions as a tool for executing HR strategies, policies, and procedures. This technological solution aids HR functions in harmonizing with the HR needs of the organization within a networked setting. E-HRM technology offers a gateway through which managers, employees, and HR experts can retrieve, extract, or modify the pertinent information required for managing HR within the organization. Additionally, the integration of E-HRM may result in a decreased dependence on HR professionals, as it eliminates the intermediary role in HR processes.

HR leaders are increasingly turning to technology and the insights it offers to make decisions that contribute to the overall success of the organization. E-HRM practices have the potential to render HR more strategic, adaptable, and cost-efficient. Information technology holds the promise of simultaneously reducing administrative expenses, increasing productivity, expediting response times, improving decision-making, and enhancing customer service. Organizations are primarily driven by three factors in their quest for IT-based HR solutions: cost reduction, the delivery of higher-quality services, and fostering cultural change.

The rapid expansion of the Internet in the past decade has greatly hastened the acceptance and utilization of electronic human resource management. E-HRM involves using information technology to support and network a minimum of two individual or collective entities in the execution of HR tasks. The concept of Virtual HR is coming to the forefront due to the increasing complexity of information technology and the expanded options it provides. Surveys carried out among HR consultants show a continual increase in the quantity of organizations adopting E-HRM and the extent to which it is integrated within these organizations. Information technology is gradually enabling companies to offer improved HR services, and numerous experts anticipate that individualized forecasting will become the primary tool for HR professionals.

E-HRM plays a crucial role in achieving in enhancing performance by leveraging rapid technological advancements. Technological innovation empowers the HR function to prioritize value-added tasks, enabling the organization to fully utilize technology's potential and align with its strategic objectives. The most significant advantage of adopting E-HRM practices is the release of HR personnel from intermediary functions, allowing them to focus on strategic planning and growth within the human resources department.

== Types ==
E-HRM can be divided into three types: Operational, Relational, and Transformational.

Operational E-HRM

Operational E-HRM, the first category, delves into the realm of administrative HR tasks, emphasizing functions such as payroll management and the maintenance of employee personal data. In this sphere, organizations are presented with a pivotal choice: they can either task their employees with the responsibility of updating their personal information through an intuitive HR website or delegate this responsibility to a dedicated administrative team. This strategic choice reflects the evolving landscape of HR management, where the adoption of E-HRM technology not only streamlines operational processes but also empowers employees to actively engage in managing their personal data.

Relational E-HRM

Relational E-HRM, the second category, assumes a central role in bolstering various critical business processes within organizations. This encompasses activities such as training, recruitment, and performance management. In the context of relational HRM, organizations are presented with the flexibility to opt for either web-based applications or rely on traditional, paper-based methods for supporting recruitment and selection endeavors. This strategic choice underscores the adaptability of E-HRM in catering to diverse organizational needs, enabling entities to seamlessly align their HR practices with the prevailing technological landscape.

Transformational E-HRM

The third and final category, Transformational E-HRM, embarks on a journey through the realm of strategic HR activities. Here, the focus shifts toward activities such as knowledge management and strategic re-orientation, pivotal components for organizations striving for agility and innovation. Within the realm of transformational HRM, organizations are bestowed with the power to cultivate a workforce that is primed for change, equipped with a comprehensive set of web-based tools that resonate with the company's overarching strategic objectives. However, organizations also have the option to cling to traditional, paper-based materials, underscoring the profound choices they face in steering their HR practices toward the future.

== Stages ==
Stages of E-HRM can be distinguished by how the E-HRM system benefits the HR, managers, and the employee within an organization. The first stage is that the E-HRM is merely a tool for publishing HR information. It only involves one-way communication from the organization to managers or employees. In this form, HR commonly uses the intranet as the primary medium for delivering HR information. The earliest publishing efforts are typically generic content, such as organization policies and procedures, system benefits, directories of services, current events, etc. Thus, it is often followed by introducing personalized content, such as job position openings that are tailored to individuals.

The second stage is the automation of HR transactions. In this stage, E-HRM accommodates and integrates HR business process workflow. Additionally, paper-based administrative works are replaced by electronic input. The organization uses both intranet and external connections. The organization occasionally also uses several application programs. In this stage, the system allows managers and employees to access the databases so that they can update information, search for information, and make decisions from it. An example of this case is an employee can inquire about employee-specific data such as paid time-off accruals and balances, current benefit coverage, personal demographic data, work schedules, or retirement plan balances.

The last stage is the HR function transformation stage. Rather than focusing on transactional-level problems, it advances to support the organization's strategic goals. In this stage, E-HRM covers three major functions. The first function is for strategic partnering with the line of business. The second function is to create centers of expertise, a house of HR specialists. And the last function is acting as service center administration for delivering better HR services. The E-HRM system in this stage allows HR to play a more active role in the stewardship of an organization's intellectual capital, developing an organization's social capital, and facilitating knowledge management within an organization.

== Goals ==
Traditionally HR goals have been broken into three categories: maintaining cost effectiveness, the enhancement of service for internal customers, and addressing the tactics of the business. With e-HRM there is a fourth goal added to the three categories and that is the improvement of global orientation of human resource management. HR functions that e-HRM assist with are the transactional and transformational goals. Transactional goals help reduce costs and transformational goals help the allocation of time improvement for HR professionals so that they may address more strategic issues. To add to these operational benefits have become an outcome of the implementation of e-HRM. The process of payroll is an example of this, with HR being able to have more transactions with fewer problems. E-HRM has increased efficiency and helped businesses reduce their HR staff through reducing costs and increasing the overall speed of different processes. E-HRM also has relational impacts for a business; enabling a company's employees and managers with the ability to access HR information and increase the connectivity of all parts of the company and outside organizations. This connectivity allows for communication on a geographic level to share information and create virtual teams. Moreover, e-HRM creates standardization, and with standardized procedures this can ensure that an organization remains compliant with HR requirements, thus also ensuring more precise decision-making. Finally, research has begun to examine the links between e-HRM and perceived labour productivity both directly and through the mediating role of HR service quality.

== Outcomes ==
Micro-level Outcomes

e-HRM provides individual impacts such as user satisfaction and acceptance. The satisfaction and acceptance are due to added value like time savings or increased accuracy of results. For instance, job applicants have more favorable perceptions of e-recruitment owing to the clearly greater number of jobs found and improved quality of information. Job applicants also react more positively to recruiting-oriented websites due to providing more positive and detail-oriented information.

Macro-level Outcomes

Macro-level outcomes are classified as operational, relational, and transformational outcomes. Operational outcomes are related to the efficiency and effectiveness outcomes of e-HRM, like HR staff reduction, cost reduction, fast processes, and lightening administrative workload. Relational outcomes refer to the interaction and network of different actors. The transformational outcomes are motivated by fundamental re-orientation of the general scope and the function of HRM that include the capability to contribute to the overall performance of the organization.

== Dark Sides ==
E-HRM is seen as offering the potential to improve services to HR department clients (both employees and management), improve efficiency and cost effectiveness within the HR department, and allow HR to become a strategic partner in achieving organizational goals. However, several things may overshadow the intended goals and potential benefits of implementing E-HRM. An organization has to consider the possible risks and unintended consequences.

The first thing an organization must consider is the E-HRM implementation cost. Due to the E-HRM being heavily related to the technological aspect, the initial investment in implementing an E-HRM system will incur a large sum of money. The benefits of E-HRM implementation are expected to outweigh the cost of implementation. In order to ensure that the E-HRM implementation is effective, an organization can use several diagnostic questions, such as whether the E-HRM system affects HRM's alignment with business strategy, whether E-HRM can create competitive advantage and better performance, whether the adoption of E-HRM across organizations results in different patterns or pace of changes in strategic HRM, and whether the investment E-HRM is made to legitimize the strategic HRM functions.

Thus, the use of E-HRM inherently brings privacy and security concerns. The system collects information about individuals and uses them for analysis to the extent that the system pries all the users’ activities. An organization should consider countermeasures to deal with security and privacy issues, such as reviewing how the data is managed, how far the data can be manipulated, and how far the users are given access to certain data. An organization should also consider the access level for each connected unit when trying to integrate its E-HRM system internally or externally.

== Practices ==
In terms of E-HRM, organizations have flexibility in how they will use a system in their HRM functions and activities.

Electronic planning

E-HRM facilitates collecting, restoring, and updating employee data, including their knowledge, skills, and competencies. It provides a faster and more knowledgeable decision-making process on a specific department's demands.

Organizations can conduct better workforce utilization analysis to examine the makeup and skills of the current workforce and forecast human resources supply and demand. By developing database inventories of in-house talent and skills of the current workforce, organizations can utilize the skills and training of current employees prior to searching externally for potential employees. Organizations can identify replacements for managerial and supervisory positions in the organization. By tracking the performance of “high potential” employees over time, organizations can assign them to key positions when the jobs become vacant. Organizations can get workforce analytics, specifically the analysis of key HR outcomes (e.g., productivity, turnover, absenteeism, employee satisfaction levels). The data can be used to conduct periodic surveys of employee satisfaction levels that are extremely important for survival and successful organizations.

On the other side, organizations may view E-HRM as a panacea, causing them to develop unrealistic expectations that these systems can increase profits and overall organizational effectiveness. In fact, the ability to improve organizational profitability or survival rates depends on internal efficiency and demand for products and services.

E-Recruitment

Using the technologies, e-HRM allows an organization to get a larger candidate pool as well as help in the selection process. As a result, the organization can shorten the recruitment processes and reduce the cost of recruitment.

Organizations can attract a greater number of applicants with a broader geographic reach and broader set of qualified applicants. Organizations can reduce administrative burdens through the automation of job applications, resume scans, and organizational responses to applicants. Organizations can reduce cycle time and cost in the recruiting process by using software for automated screening. Organizations can automatically track applicants, monitor performance and post-hire retention rates, and identify the factors that affect successful placements. Organizations can extend their brand by communicating the company cultures and values to prospective applicants, heightening applicant attraction, and helping to distinguish them from their competitors.

However, organizations may actually attract larger numbers of poorly qualified applicants and those who are a poor fit with the organization. E-HRM does not always enhance the overall quality of applicants. Organizations, in other ways, have increasing administrative workloads due to the sheer increasing volume of applicants. Organizations may fail to attract talented applicants because of the impersonal nature of e-recruiting and the recruitment websites that are not user-friendly. Organizations cannot reach members of some protected groups because of the digital divide, inability to access the system, and inability to use computers. It disproportionately negatively impacts members of some protected groups, such as racial and ethnic minorities, older applicants, disabled people, and those who live in rural areas.

E-Selection

Organizations can streamline the initial screening process and reduce the administrative burden and administrative cost associated with reviewing numerous applications or resumes by using automatic scanning and screening features. Organizations can conduct internet employment testing processes with the benefit of speed, timeliness, flexibility, and decreased overall costs associated with testing. Organizations can get the score selection tests automatically and give applicants immediate feedback on the degree to which they are qualified for jobs. Organizations can conduct the interview through telephone, videoconferencing, and other forms of technology. Organizations can collect and store data used to evaluate the validity of inferences made from selection predictors and the overall effectiveness of the selection process. Organizations can generate online surveys to examine applicants’ reactions to the selection process, and the data from these surveys can be used to improve selection procedures.

Organizations may face risks that the use of computerized or internet-based testing may not be equivalent to previously validated tests. In some research, they found that scores on the two types of tests were not equivalent. Organizations may not be able to make valid inferences about applicants’ job performance by relying on scores or ratings on the new selection procedures (e.g., online applications, computerized tests, electronic interviews). Some reasons are the wrong keywording, system inequivalent results between computerized tests and paper-pencil versions, and the demanding nature of doing two cognitive tasks simultaneously: navigating the test software and completing the test simultaneously. Organizations may face risks of losing qualified applicants with lower computer self-efficacy or higher computer anxiety who perform more poorly on online tests than on paper-pencil tests.

E-Learning

By using open and flexible materials, e-learning is an innovative approach well-designed, student-oriented, interactive, and facilitated learning environment for anyone. E-learning allows them to acquire knowledge without getting bounded by time and place. For instance, Ernst and Young cut the training time by 52% through e-learning. Organizations can develop a more flexible learning-centered culture through mobile learning by providing employees with more tightly focused, timely, and job-relevant multimedia experiences that can be accessed.

Organizations can save training costs. One of the biggest expenses in corporate training is travel-related, with estimates suggesting that as much as 40% of training costs are travel-related. Research consistently found that e-learning can reduce costs and improve efficiency. Some companies could cut training costs by implementing e-learning, such as Ernst and Young cutting 35% of training cost, IBM cutting $400 million of training budget, and Cisco reducing 40-60% of training costs.

While the e-learning model gives advantages, it also brings several downsides that an organization must consider. The common downside is less human interaction between trainer and trainee. This is because e-learning, to some extent, forces trainees situated in an isolated condition. Often, e-learning does not actively involve the presence of a trainer, instead using premade study materials using video or extensive readings. Effectively, a trainee is learning by themselves.

E-Compensation

By using web-based software and tools, managers can design, manage, and report compensation policies. E-Compensation is capable of administrating compensation management routines, including responding to the employees when they ask for their confidential information or a specific reward system.

Organizations can increase efficiency and lower costs using technology to support compensation and benefits. The automating compensation planning system can reduce $850,000 per year in administrative costs and reduce compensation planning time by over 50%. Organizations get improved data accuracy because these systems can reduce errors and increase decision-making accuracy. Organizations can better integrate data from external (e.g., pay surveys) and internal (e.g., current compensation) sources that enable them to identify any areas of inequity in compensation structures.

Organizations can develop compensation strategies that improve internal and external equity using more accurate, timely, and complete data. Organizations can quickly and efficiently integrate external pay data into compensation plans and more proactively address pay issues within the firm to reduce the risk of losing employees due to pay differentials.

Organizations can increase employee perceptions of organizational support and organizational citizenship behaviors (OCBs). Systems that are accurate, secure, easy to use, and provide convenience to the employee lead to stronger satisfaction levels, higher levels of perceived organizational support, and increased levels of engagement in OCBs. Through well-designed e-benefit systems, organizations can help employees develop a better understanding of the benefits available to them. It will enhance how employees perceive their organization and motivate them to engage in greater citizenship behaviors.

Organizations’ needs may not be provided by the system because of the rigidity and inflexibility. Organizations can fail to retain employees because they should get salary increases faster based on performance or a competing job offer than it should be based on the standards and rules of the company.

On the other side, occasionally, managers will rely too much on technology for decision-making. Blind compliance with compensation software is an abdication of the responsibility of the manager and is ineffective for the firm in the long run. In addition, because the business environment is evolving rapidly, technology may not be able to keep up with the changes in the business environment, causing the e-compensation system to become outdated. Therefore, decision models that work today will need to evolve over time to ensure that they continue to be appropriate in the future.

Electronic performance management

Electronic performance management can be explained as the audiovisual computer systems for performance management processes: collection, storage, analysis, and reporting. It is expected to obtain high organizational performance through individual performance by providing employees with the necessary knowledge, techniques, methods, and support systems.

E-HRM for performance management functions offers organizations significant advantages, including data-driven decision-making, streamlined operations, reduced administrative workload, and cost savings. These systems also enjoy support, particularly from younger employees, and facilitate the standardization and integration of information networks. Overall, E-HRM can empower organizations by providing data-driven insights, improving operational efficiency, and enhancing their strategic capabilities.

However, using E-HRM for performance management entails certain drawbacks, including the potential for inefficient resource allocation and limited user interaction, with decentralization influenced by the significance of lower-level decisions. The system may exhibit reduced mobility, adaptability, and considerable processing time demands, although decentralization can mitigate these issues by simplifying decision-making and fostering worker initiative. Financial risks emerge due to the high creation costs, often involving external consultants unfamiliar with specific enterprise intricacies. Even when developed internally, the system can pose challenges such as prolonged development timelines, ongoing adaptability requirements, and dependence on key specialists. If developers leave the company, support and operational issues may arise.

=== AI Integration in E-HRM ===
With the rise of artificial intelligence (AI), E-HRM systems are evolving to provide advanced data analytics, predictive capabilities, and personalized experiences for employees. AI enhances various HR functions by enabling data-driven decision-making, improving recruitment efficiency, and supporting real-time performance management. According to recent studies, AI in e-HRM assists organizations in automating routine tasks, such as resume screening, and provides insights into employee engagement through sentiment analysis. This integration not only improves efficiency but also supports strategic HRM by predicting future workforce needs and potential talent gaps.

AI tools in e-HRM can analyze large datasets to identify patterns and trends in employee behavior, allowing HR departments to take proactive steps to address issues like attrition. For example, AI-powered sentiment analysis tools can monitor communication channels and identify declines in morale, enabling early intervention by HR managers. Additionally, AI's predictive capabilities assist in workforce planning by analyzing turnover patterns and skill requirements, helping organizations maintain a competitive talent edge.

== See also ==
- Human resource management
