= Stewart v Moray Council =

- Court: Employment Appeal Tribunal
- Citation: [2006] ICR 1253 (EAT)

Keywords
- Information and consultation

Stewart v Moray Council [2006] ICR 1253 (EAT) is a UK labour law case, concerning the information and consultation (I&C) in the European Union.

== Facts ==
500 employees of Moray Council made a request for an I&C procedure. This was over 10 per cent of the employees, but not 40 per cent. Moray Council claimed that it did not need an I&C procedure, because there was already a collective agreement with a protocol about information and consultation with the union. Moray Council demanded a ballot with a 40 per cent threshold under ICER 2004 regulation 8(1) voting. Stewart argued the collective agreement did not provide for representation of non-union employees and had not been endorsed by all employees, so the collective agreement was not a ‘pre-existing agreement’ under regulation 8(1).

The Central Arbitration Committee (CAC) decided that the pre-existing agreement did not comply with all requirements because although a majority of employees were union members, one of the recognition agreements was unclear about when consultation would take place. The agreement relating to school teachers failed to set out how the employer gave information to employees or their representatives or sought views on information under regulation 8(1)(d).

== Judgment ==
The Employment Appeal Tribunal (EAT) upheld. The employer was required to negotiate for an information and consultation procedure. ICER 2004 do not prescribe any way that an employee approval is to be demonstrated for a pre-existing agreement. This contrasts to negotiated agreements under reg 16. Elias J said the following.

36. But there is a further potential problem. Was the CAC entitled to find the requisite approval in the fact that the majority consists of trade union members? Mr Stewart says not; he correctly says that the non unionists have not had the opportunity to pass any comment on the agreements ostensibly regulating their position, nor have they participated in the appointment or election of the union representatives who are consulted pursuant to them. He contends that all the employees should have been entitled to express their support or otherwise for the existing arrangements. Mr Napier submits that this is irrelevant. It is not necessary in all cases that each employee should expressly have had the opportunity to approve the agreement; it is enough that it is in fact supported by a majority of the relevant employees. He observes that the Regulations provide that it is for the CAC to determine whether that majority approval exists. It is not necessary that each employee should have had the right to express an opinion on the matter, whether in a ballot or some other way. The CAC must consider all the evidence before it and determine whether there is the requisite support for the agreement. If there is a proper evidential basis for the CAC's conclusion, the EAT cannot interfere. It is only if the CAC errs in law that the EAT has power to intervene.

37. We have found this the most difficult issue in the case, but we prefer the argument of Mr Napier. It is in our view relevant that regulation 8 does not prescribe any particular way in which employee approval needs to be demonstrated. This is in contrast to regulation 16 which specifically provides for circumstances where the employees must approve a negotiated agreement, and stipulates that any such approval must be manifest either by support shown in a ballot, or by approval in writing of a majority of the employees. Had the draftsman intended that there should be a similar positive and specific demonstration of support to establish the requisite approval under regulation 8, we think that he would have said so. This is particularly so since in practice collective agreements negotiated with trade unions will not, in the ordinary way, be subject to express approval in a ballot, and the draftsman must be taken to know that.

38. Of course, there must be evidence from which the CAC can, using their wide industrial relations experience, properly infer that the majority of the employees covered by a particular agreement have approved that agreement. Obviously whether there is such evidence will depend on the particular circumstances, but in our view it will usually be legitimate to infer approval if, at the time the agreement was made, the majority of the employees covered by the agreement were members of the union or unions which are parties to that agreement. (The CAC rightly focused on the position when the agreements were made; they did not have union membership statistics for that time but assumed that they were not materially different to the statistics showing membership at the time of the application.) However, it will not always be legitimate to draw such an inference even where the trade unionists are in a majority if, for example, there is evidence that there was a degree of opposition to the agreement at the time from employees within the trade union itself. The CAC is a highly experienced body and it will be for it to decide, in the light of all the evidence, whether it is proper to infer the requisite support or not. If, therefore, union members constitute a majority of the employees covered by the agreement, then generally the approval of the employees will be established. Whatever the opinion of the non-unionists, the support of the trade unionists will carry the day. If, by contrast, union membership were in a minority, then it would not be appropriate to infer the necessary approval and it would be necessary for the employer to be able to establish the relevant approval in some other way, such as by seeking formal approval in a ballot of the relevant employees. This would have to be done prior to the request being made.

== See also ==
- UK labour law
- Codetermination
