= List of statutory instruments of the United Kingdom, 2004 =

For lists of statutory instruments of the United Kingdom, 2004, see:

- List of statutory instruments of the United Kingdom, 2004 (1–1700)
- List of statutory instruments of the United Kingdom, 2004 (1701–3500)
