= List of statutory instruments of the United Kingdom, 2004 (1701–3500) =

This is an incomplete list of statutory instruments of the United Kingdom in 2004 (1701–3500).

== 1701–1800 ==
- The Local Authorities (Categorisation) (England) Order 2004 (S.I. 2004 No. 1704)
- The Local Government (Best Value Authorities) (Power to Trade) (England) Order 2004 (S.I. 2004 No. 1705)
- The Road Vehicles (Construction and Use) (Amendment) Regulations 2004 (S.I. 2004 No. 1706)
- The Nationality, Immigration and Asylum Act 2002 (Commencement No. 8) Order 2004 (S.I. 2004 No. 1707 (C. 65 )])
- The Social Security (Students and Income-related Benefits) Amendment Regulations 2004 (S.I. 2004 No. 1708)
- The Value Added Tax (Refund of Tax to Museums and Galleries) (Amendment) Order 2004 (S.I. 2004 No. 1709)
- The Liberia (Freezing of Funds and Economic Resources) (Amendment) Regulations 2004 (S.I. 2004 No. 1710)
- The Pensions Increase (Civil Service Injury Benefits Scheme) Regulations 2004 (S.I. 2004 No. 1711)
- The Davies Lane Infant School (Change to School Session Times) Order 2004 (S.I. 2004 No. 1712)
- The Fishing Vessels (Working Time: Sea-fishermen) Regulations 2004 (S.I. 2004 No.1713)
- The Government Resources and Accounts Act 2000 (Audit of Health Service Bodies) Order 2004 (S.I. 2004 No. 1714)
- The Government Resources and Accounts Act 2000 (Audit of Public Bodies) Order 2004 (S.I. 2004 No. 1715)
- The Town and Country Planning (Costs of Inquiries etc.) (Examination in Public) (England) Regulations 2004 (S.I. 2004 No. 1716)
- The Employment Act 2002 (Commencement No. 6 and Transitional Provision) Order 2004 (S.I. 2004 No. 1717 (C. 66 )])
- The Bishop of Winchester Comprehensive (Designation as having a Religious Character) Order 2004 (S.I. 2004 No. 1725)
- The British Nationality (General) (Amendment) Regulations 2004 (S.I. 2004 No. 1726)
- The Food Safety (General Food Hygiene) (Amendment) (England) Regulations 2004 (S.I. 2004 No. 1727)
- The Education Act 2002 (Commencement No. 5) (Wales) Order 2004 (S.I. 2004 No. 1728 (W.172) (C.67))
- Gorchymyn Deddf Addysg 2002 (Cychwyn Rhif 5) (Cymru) 2004 (S.I. 2004 Rhif 1728 (Cy.172) (C.67))
- The Education (School Teachers' Qualifications) (Wales) Regulations 2004 (S.I. 2004 No. 1729 (W.173))
- Rheoliadau Addysg (Cymwysterau Athrawon Ysgol) (Cymru) 2004 (S.I. 2004 Rhif 1729 (Cy.173))
- The Care Standards Act 2000 (Commencement No. 14) (Wales) Order 2004 (S.I. 2004 No. 1730 (W.174) (C.68))
- Gorchymyn Deddf Safonau Gofal 2000 (Cychwyn Rhif 14) (Cymru) 2004 (S.I. 2004 Rhif 1730 (Cy.174) (C.68))
- The Medical Act 1983 (Amendment) Order 2002 (Saving Provision) Order of Council 2004 (S.I. 2004 No. 1731)
- The Children (Leaving Care) (Wales) (Amendment) Regulations 2004 (S.I. 2004 No. 1732 (W.175))
- Rheoliadau Plant (Ymadael â Gofal) (Cymru) (Diwygio) 2004 (S.I. 2004 Rhif 1732 (Cy.175))
- The Wildlife and Countryside Act 1981 (Amendment) (Wales) Regulations 2004 (S.I. 2004 No. 1733 (W.176))
- Rheoliadau Deddf Bywyd Gwyllt a Chefn Gwlad 1981 (Diwygio) (Cymru) 2004 (S.I. 2004 Rhif 1733 (Cy.176))
- The Designation of Schools Having A Religious Character and Amendments (Wales) Order 2004 (S.I. 2004 No. 1734 (W.177))
- Gorchymyn Dynodi Ysgolion Sydd â Chymeriad Crefyddol a Diwygiadau (Cymru) 2004 (S.I. 2004 Rhif 1734 (Cy.177))
- The School Governors' Annual Reports (Wales) (Amendment) Regulations 2004 (S.I. 2004 No. 1735 (W.178))
- Rheoliadau Adroddiadau Blynyddol Llywodraethwyr Ysgol (Cymru) (Diwygio) 2004 (S.I. 2004 Rhif 1735 (Cy.178))
- The Education (School Information) (Wales) (Amendment) Regulations 2004 (S.I. 2004 No. 1736 (W.179))
- Rheoliadau Addysg (Gwybodaeth Ysgolion) (Cymru) (Diwygio) 2004 (S.I. 2004 Rhif 1736 (Cy.179))
- Football Spectators (Seating) Order 2004 (S.I. 2004 No. 1737)
- Licensing Act 2003 (Commencement No. 4) Order 2004 (S.I. 2004 No. 1738 (C.69)])
- Licensing Act 2003 (First appointed day and personal licences transitional period) Order 2004 (S.I. 2004 No. 1739)
- The Products of Animal Origin (Third Country Imports) (England) (No. 2) Regulations 2004 (S.I. 2004 No. 1740)
- The General Teaching Council for Wales (Functions) (Amendment) Regulations 2004 (S.I. 2004 No. 1741 (W.180))
- Rheoliadau Cyngor Addysgu Cyffredinol Cymru (Swyddogaethau) (Diwygio) 2004 (S.I. 2004 Rhif 1741 (Cy.180))
- The Wales Centre for Health (Constitution, Membership and Procedures ) Regulations 2004 (S.I. 2004 No. 1742 (W.181))
- Rheoliadau Canolfan Iechyd Cymru (Cyfansoddiad, Aelodaeth a Gweithdrefnau) 2004 (S.I. 2004 Rhif 1742 (Cy.181))
- The Education Act 2002 (Transitional Provisions and Consequential Amendments) (Wales) Regulations 2004 (S.I. 2004 No. 1743 (W.182))
- Rheoliadau Deddf Addysg 2002 (Darpariaethau Trosiannol a Diwygiadau Canlyniadol) (Cymru) 2004 (S.I. 2004 Rhif 1743 (Cy.182))
- The Education (Specified Work and Registration) (Wales) Regulations 2004 (S.I. 2004 No. 1744 (W.183))
- Rheoliadau Addysg (Gwaith Penodedig a Chofrestru) (Cymru) 2004 (S.I. 2004 Rhif 1744 (Cy.183))
- The School Teachers (Consequential Amendments) (Wales) Regulations 2004 (S.I. 2004 No. 1745 (W.184))
- Rheoliadau Athrawon Ysgol (Diwygiadau Canlyniadol) (Cymru) 2004 (S.I. 2004 Rhif 1745 (Cy.184))
- The Offshore Installations (Safety Zones) (No. 3) Order 2004 (S.I. 2004 No. 1746)
- The Crime (International Co-operation) Act 2003 (Designation of Prosecuting Authorities) (Amendment) Order 2004 (S.I. 2004 No. 1747)
- The Community Care, Services for Carers and Children's Services (Direct Payments) (Wales) Regulations 2004 (S.I. 2004 No. 1748 (W.185))
- Rheoliadau Gofal Cymunedol, Gwasanaethau ar gyfer Gofalwyr a Gwasanaethau Plant (Taliadau Uniongyrchol) (Cymru) 2004 (S.I. 2004 Rhif 1748 (Cy.185))
- The Feeding Stuffs, the Feeding Stuffs (Sampling and Analysis) and the Feeding Stuffs (Enforcement) (Amendment) (Wales) Regulations 2004 (S.I. 2004 No. 1749 (W.186))
- Rheoliadau Porthiant, Porthiant (Samplu a Dadansoddi), a Phorthiant (Gorfodi) (Diwygio) (Cymru) 2004 (S.I. 2004 Rhif 1749 (Cy.186))
- The Health and Social Care Act 2001 (Commencement No. 7) (Wales) Order 2004 (S.I. 2004 No. 1754 (W.187) (C.70))
- Gorchymyn Deddf Iechyd a Gofal Cymdeithasol 2001 (Cychwyn Rhif 7) (Cymru) 2004 (S.I. 2004 Rhif 1754 (Cy.187) (C.70))
- The Transport Act 2000 (Consequential Amendment) Order 2004 (S.I. 2004 No. 1755)
- The Adult Placement Schemes (Wales) Regulations 2004 (S.I. 2004 No. 1756 (W.188))
- Rheoliadau Cynlluniau Lleoli Oedolion (Cymru) 2004 (S.I. 2004 Rhif 1756 (Cy.188))
- The Care Standards Act 2000 (Commencement No. 20) Order 2004 (S.I. 2004 No. 1757 (C.71 )])
- The Home Loss Payments (Prescribed Amounts) (Wales) Regulations 2004 (S.I. 2004 No. 1758 (W.189))
- Rheoliadau Taliadau Colli Cartref (Symiau Rhagnodedig) (Cymru) 2004 (S.I. 2004 Rhif 1758 (Cy.189))
- The Police Act 1997 (Criminal Records) (Amendment) (No. 2) Regulations 2004 (S.I. 2004 No. 1759)
- The Police Pensions (Amendment) (No. 2) Regulations 2004 (S.I. 2004 No. 1760)
- The Nursing and Midwifery Council (Fitness to Practise) Rules Order of Council 2004 (S.I. 2004 No. 1761)
- The Nursing and Midwifery Order 2001 (Transitional Provisions) Order of Council 2004 (S.I. 2004 No. 1762)
- Nursing and Midwifery Order 2001 (Legal Assessors) Order of Council 2004 (S.I. 2004 No. 1763)
- The Nursing and Midwifery Council (Midwives) Rules Order of Council 2004 (S.I. 2004 No. 1764)
- Nurses and Midwives (Parts of and Entries in the Register) Order of Council 2004 (S.I. 2004 No. 1765)
- European Nursing and Midwifery Qualifications Designation Order of Council 2004 (S.I. 2004 No. 1766)
- The Nursing and Midwifery Council (Education, Registration and Registration Appeals) Rules Order of Council 2004 (S.I. 2004 No. 1767)
- The National Health Service (Complaints) Regulations 2004 (S.I. 2004 No. 1768)
- The Justification of Practices Involving Ionising Radiation Regulations 2004 (S.I. 2004 No. 1769)
- The Care Standards Act 2000 (Establishments and Agencies) (Miscellaneous Amendments) Regulations 2004 (S.I. 2004 No. 1770)
- The Health Act 1999 (Consequential Amendments) (Nursing and Midwifery) Order 2004 (S.I. 2004 No.1771)
- The General Medical Services (Transitional Measure Relating to Non-Clinical Partners) Order 2004 (S.I. 2004 No. 1772)
- The Road Vehicles (Registration and Licensing) (Amendment No. 2) Regulations 2004 (S.I. 2004 No. 1773)
- The Electricity (Exemption from the Requirement for a Generation Licence) (No.2) Order 2004 (S.I. 2004 No. 1776)
- The Cotswolds Area of Outstanding Natural Beauty (Establishment of Conservation Board) Order 2004 (S.I. 2004 No. 1777)
- The Chilterns Area of Outstanding Natural Beauty (Establishment of Conservation Board) Order 2004 (S.I. 2004 No. 1778)
- The Iraq (United Nations Sanctions) Order 2000 (Amendment No.2) Regulations 2004 (S.I. 2004 No. 1779)
- The New Roads and Street Works Act 1991 (Commencement No. 1) (Wales) Order 2004 (S.I. 2004 No. 1780 (C.72)])
- The Education (Mandatory Awards) (Amendment) (No. 2) Regulations 2004 (S.I. 2004 No. 1792)
- The Education (National Curriculum) (Attainment Targets and Programmes of Study in Modern Foreign Languages in respect of the Third Key Stage) (England) (No.2) Order 2004 (S.I. 2004 No. 1793)
- The Education (National Curriculum) (Attainment Targets and Programmes of Study in Design and Technology in respect of the First, Second and Third Key Stages) (England) (No.2) Order 2004 (S.I. 2004 No. 1794)
- The West Midlands (Coroners' Districts) Order 2004 (S.I. 2004 No. 1799)
- The Education (National Curriculum) (Attainment Targets and Programmes of Study in Science in respect of the First, Second Third and Fourth Key Stages) (England) (No.2) Order 2004 (S.I. 2004 No. 1800)

== 1801–1900 ==
- The A59 Trunk Road (Liverpool–Preston) (Detrunking) Order 2004 (S.I. 2004 No. 1801)
- The Approval of Codes of Management Practice (Residential Property)(England) Order 2004 (S.I. 2004 No.1802)
- The Animal Gatherings (Wales) Order 2004 (S.I. 2004 No. 1803 (W.191))
- Gorchymyn Crynoadau Anifeiliaid (Cymru) 2004 (S.I. 2004 Rhif 1803 (Cy.191))
- The Food (Emergency Control) (Wales) (Miscellaneous Amendments) (No. 2) Regulations 2004 (S.I. 2004 No. 1804 (W.192))
- Rheoliadau Bwyd (Rheolaeth Frys) (Cymru) (Diwygiadau Amrywiol) (Rhif 2) 2004 (S.I. 2004 Rhif 1804 (Cy.192))
- The Education (Pupil Exclusions and Appeals) (Wales) (Miscellaneous Amendments) Regulations 2004 (S.I. 2004 No. 1805 (W.193))
- Rheoliadau Addysg (Gwahardd Disgyblion ac Apelau) (Cymru) (Diwygiadau Amrywiol) 2004 (S.I. 2004 Rhif 1805 (Cy.193))
- The Housing (Right to Buy) (Priority of Charges) (Wales) Order 2004 (S.I. 2004 No. 1806 (W.194))
- Gorchymyn Tai (Hawl i Brynu) (Blaenoriaeth Arwystlon) (Cymru) 2004 (S.I. 2004 Rhif 1806 (Cy.194))
- The Education (Assisted Places) (Incidental Expenses) (Amendment) (Wales) Regulations 2004 (S.I. 2004 No. 1807 (W.195))
- Rheoliadau Addysg (Lleoedd a Gynorthwyir) (Mân Dreuliau) (Diwygio) (Cymru) 2004 (S.I. 2004 Rhif 1807 (Cy.195))
- The Building (Amendment) (No.2) Regulations 2004 (S.I. 2004 No. 1808)
- The Street Works (Inspection Fees) (Amendment) (Wales) Regulations 2004 (S.I. 2004 No. 1809 (W.196))
- Rheoliadau Gweithfeydd Stryd (Ffioedd Archwilio) (Diwygio) (Cymru) 2004 (S.I. 2004 Rhif 1809 (Cy.196))
- The Plant Protection Products (Amendment) Regulations 2004 (S.I. 2004 No. 1810)
- The Agricultural Holdings (Units of Production) (England) Order 2004 (S.I. 2004 No. 1811)
- The Education (Assisted Places) (Amendment) (Wales) Regulations 2004 (S.I. 2004 No. 1812 (W.197))
- Rheoliadau Addysg (Lleoedd a Gynorthwyir) (Diwygio) (Cymru) 2004 (S.I. 2004 Rhif 1812 (Cy.197))
- The Planning and Compulsory Purchase Act 2004 (Commencement No. 2) (Wales) Order 2004 (S.I. 2004 No. 1813 (W.198) (C.73))
- Gorchymyn Deddf Cynllunio a Phrynu Gorfodol 2004 (Cychwyn Rhif 2) (Cymru) 2004 (S.I. 2004 Rhif 1813 (Cy.198) (C.73))
- The Planning and Compulsory Purchase Act 2004 (Commencement No.1 and Transitional Provision) (Wales) Order 2004 (S.I. 2004 No. 1814 (W.199) (C.74))
- Gorchymyn Deddf Cynllunio a Phrynu Gorfodol 2004 (Cychwyn Rhif 1 a Darpariaeth Drosiannol) (Cymru) 2004 (S.I. 2004 Rhif 1814 (Cy.199) (C.74))
- The Local Authorities (Elected Mayors) (England) Regulations 2004 (S.I. 2004 No. 1815)
- The Controls on Nonylphenol and Nonylphenol Ethoxylate Regulations 2004 (S.I. 2004 No. 1816)
- Eden Valley Railway Order 2004 (S.I. 2004 No. 1817)
- The Uranium Enrichment Technology (Prohibition on Disclosure) Regulations 2004 (S.I. 2004 No. 1818)
- The Thalidomide Children's Trust (Application of Section 329AA of the Income and Corporation Taxes Act 1988) Order 2004 (S.I. 2004 No. 1819)
- The Social Security (Claims and Payments) Amendment (No. 2) Regulations 2004 (S.I. 2004 No. 1821)
- The Water Industry (Scotland) Act 2002 (Consequential Modifications) Order 2004 (S.I. 2004 No. 1822 (S. 3)])
- The Scottish Public Services Ombudsman Act 2002 (Consequential Provisions and Modifications) Order 2004 (S.I. 2004 No. 1823 (S. 4)])
- The Tobacco Advertising and Promotion (Brandsharing) Regulations 2004 (S.I. 2004 No. 1824)
- The General Medical Services (Transitional Measure Relating to Non-Clinical Partners) (Wales) Order 2004 (S.I. 2004 No. 1825 (W.201))
- Gorchymyn y Gwasanaethau Meddygol Cyffredinol (Mesur Trosiannol sy'n Ymwneud â Phartneriaid Anghlinigol) (Cymru) 2004 (S.I. 2004 Rhif 1825 (Cy.201))
- The Welsh Development Agency (Financial Limit) Order 2004 (S.I. 2004 No. 1826 (W.202))
- Gorchymyn Awdurdod Datblygu Cymru (Terfyn Ariannol) 2004 (S.I. 2004 Rhif 1826 (Cy.202))
- The Bus Service Operators Grant (Wales) (Amendment) Regulations 2004 (S.I. 2004 No. 1827 (W.203))
- Rheoliadau Grant Gweithredwyr Gwasanaeth Bysiau (Cymru) (Diwygio) 2004 (S.I. 2004 Rhif 1827 (Cy.203))
- The Commonhold Regulations 2004 (S.I. 2004 No. 1829)
- THE Commonhold (Land Registration) Rules 2004 (S.I. 2004 No. 1830)
- The Fireworks Act 2003 (Commencement No. 2) Order 2004 (S.I. 2004 No. 1831 (C. 75)])
- The Commonhold and Leasehold Reform Act 2002 (Commencement No. 4) Order 2004 (S.I. 2004 No. 1832 (C. 76)])
- The Land Registration Fee (Amendment) Order 2004 (S.I. 2004 No. 1833)
- The Immigration (Provision of Physical Data) (Amendment) (No. 2) Regulations 2004 (S.I. 2004 No. 1834)
- The Magistrates' Courts Warrants (Specification of Provisions) (Amendment) Order 2004 (S.I. 2004 No. 1835)
- Fireworks Regulations 2004 (S.I. 2004 No. 1836)
- The Representation of the People (Form of Canvass) (England and Wales) Regulations 2004 (S.I. 2004 No. 1848)
- The Health Act 1999 (Commencement No.15) Order 2004 (S.I. 2004 No. 1859 (C.77)])
- The Health Act 1999 (Consequential Amendments) (Nursing and Midwifery) (No. 2) Order 2004 (S.I. 2004 No. 1860 (S.5 )])
- The Employment Tribunals (Constitution and Rules of Procedure) Regulations 2004 (S.I. 2004 No. 1861)
- The Financial Conglomerates and Other Financial Groups Regulations 2004 (S.I. 2004 No. 1862)
- The Tax Avoidance Schemes (Prescribed Descriptions of Arrangements) Regulations 2004 (S.I. 2004 No. 1863)
- The Tax Avoidance Schemes (Information) Regulations 2004 (S.I. 2004 No. 1864)
- The Tax Avoidance Schemes (Promoters and Prescribed Circumstances) Regulations 2004 (S.I. 2004 No. 1865)
- The Enterprise Act 2002 (Commencement No. 6) Order 2004 (S.I. 2004 No.1866 (C. 78 )])
- The Criminal Justice Act 2003 (Commencement No. 5) Order 2004 (S.I. 2004 No. 1867 (C. 79)])
- The Independent Review of Determinations (Hague Convention Adoptions and Miscellaneous Amendments) Regulations 2004 (S.I. 2004 No. 1868)
- The Social Security (Income Support and Jobseeker's Allowance) Amendment Regulations 2004 (S.I. 2004 No. 1869)
- Freedom of Information (Additional Public Authorities) (Amendment) Order 2004 (S.I. 2004 No. 1870)
- The Charges for Inspections and Controls (Amendment) (No. 2) Regulations 2004 (S.I. 2004 No. 1871)
- The Road Vehicles (Registration and Licensing) (Amendment) (No. 3) Regulations 2004 (S.I. 2004 No. 1872)
- The Goods Vehicles (Plating and Testing) (Amendment) Regulations 2004 (S.I. 2004 No. 1873)
- The Waste and Emissions Trading Act 2003 (Commencement No. 2) Order 2004 (S.I. 2004 No. 1874 (C. 80 )])
- The Public Service Vehicles (Operators' Licences) (Fees) (Amendment) Regulations 2004 (S.I. 2004 No. 1876)
- The General Chiropractic Council (Continuing Professional Development) Rules Order of Council 2004 (S.I. 2004 No. 1877)
- The Goods Vehicles (Licensing of Operators) (Fees) (Amendment) Regulations 2004 (S.I. 2004 No. 1878)
- The Motor Vehicles (Tests) (Amendment) (No. 2) Regulations 2004 (S.I. 2004 No. 1879)
- The Public Service Vehicles (Conditions of Fitness, Equipment, Use and Certification) (Amendment) Regulations 2004 (S.I. 2004 No. 1880)
- The Public Service Vehicles Accessibility (Amendment) Regulations 2004 (S.I. 2004 No. 1881)
- The Road Transport (International Passenger Services) (Amendment) Regulations 2004 (S.I. 2004 No. 1882)
- The Goods Vehicles (Authorisation of International Journeys) (Fees) (Amendment) Regulations 2004 (S.I. 2004 No. 1883)
- The International Carriage of Dangerous Goods by Road (Fees) (Amendment) Regulations 2004 (S.I. 2004 No. 1884)
- The Passenger and Goods Vehicles (Recording Equipment) (Approval of Fitters and Workshops) (Fees) (Amendment) Regulations 2004 (S.I. 2004 No. 1885)
- The General Teaching Council for England (Additional Functions) Order 2004 (S.I. 2004 No. 1886)
- The Police and Criminal Evidence Act 1984 (Codes of Practice) Order 2004 (S.I. 2004 No.1887)
- The Ecclesiastical Judges, Legal Officers and Others (Fees) Order 2004 (S.I. 2004 No. 1888)
- The Church Representation Rules (Amendment) Resolution 2004 (S.I. 2004 No. 1889)
- The Parochial Fees Order 2004 (S.I. 2004 No. 1890)
- Immigration and Asylum Appeals (Fast Track Procedure) (Amendment) Rules 2004 (S.I. 2004 No. 1891 (L. 10)])
- The Criminal Justice and Court Services Act 2000 (Amendment) Order 2004 (S.I. 2004 No. 1892)
- The A6 Trunk Road (South of Leicester to A14) (Detrunking) Order 2004 (S.I. 2004 No. 1893)
- The A6 Trunk Road (Leicester to M1 Motorway) (Detrunking) Order 2004 (S.I. 2004 No. 1894)
- The Tax Credits (Provision of Information) (Functions Relating to Health) (Scotland) Regulations 2004 (S.I. 2004 No. 1895 (S.6)])
- The Motor Vehicles (Evidence of Test Certificates) Regulations 2004 (S.I. 2004 No. 1896)
- The Extradition Act 2003 (Repeals) Order 2004 (S.I. 2004 No. 1897)
- The Extradition Act 2003 (Amendment to Designations) Order 2004 (S.I. 2004 No. 1898)
- The Carriage by Air Acts (Application of Provisions) Order 2004 (S.I. 2004 No. 1899)

== 1901–2000 ==
- Safety of Sports Grounds (Designation) Order 2004 (S.I. 2004 No.1907)
- The Council Tax Limitation (England) (Maximum Amounts) Order 2004 (S.I. 2004 No. 1908)
- The Freedom of Information Act 2000 (Commencement No. 4) Order 2004 (S.I. 2004 No. 1909 (C.81)])
- The Nationality, Immigration and Asylum Act 2002 (Specification of Particularly Serious Crimes) Order 2004 (S.I. 2004 No. 1910)
- The International Transport of Goods under Cover of TIR Carnets (Fees) (Amendment) Regulations 2004 (S.I. 2004 No. 1911)
- The Firemen's Pension Scheme (Amendment) Order 2004 (S.I. 2004 No. 1912)
- The Superannuation (Admission to Schedule 1 to the Superannuation Act 1972) Order 2004 (S.I. 2004 No. 1927)
- The Value Added Tax (Disclosure of Avoidance Schemes) Regulations 2004 (S.I. 2004 No. 1929)
- The National Minimum Wage Regulations 1999 (Amendment) (No. 2) Regulations 2004 (S.I. 2004 No. 1930)
- The Value Added Tax (Groups: eligibility) Order 2004 (S.I. 2004 No. 1931)
- The Student Fees (Amounts) (England) Regulations 2004 (S.I. 2004 No. 1932)
- The Value Added Tax (Disclosure of Avoidance Schemes) (Designations) Order 2004 (S.I. 2004 No. 1933)
- The Finance Act 2004, section 19(1) and Schedule 2, (Appointed Day) Order 2004 (S.I. 2004 No. 1934 (C. 82)])
- The General Teaching Council for England (Constitution) (Amendment) Regulations 2004 (S.I. 2004 No. 1935)
- The Landfill (Scheme Year and Maximum Landfill Amount) Regulations 2004 (S.I. 2004 No. 1936)
- The Summary Appeal Courts (Warrant Officers) Order 2004 (S.I. 2004 No. 1937)
- The Armed Forces Act 2001 (Commencement No. 4) Order 2004 (S.I. 2004 No. 1938 (C. 83 )])
- The Regulatory Reform (Museum of London) (Location of Premises) Order 2004 (S.I. 2004 No. 1939)
- The Companies (Disqualification Orders) (Amendment) Regulations 2004 (S.I. 2004 No. 1940)
- The Insolvency Act 2000 (Company Directors Disqualification Undertakings) Order 2004 (S.I. 2004 No. 1941)
- The Finance Act 2004, section 291, (Appointed Day) Order 2004 (S.I. 2004 No. 1942 (C. 84)])
- The National Insurance Contributions and Statutory Payments Act 2004 (Commencement) Order 2004 (S.I. 2004 No. 1943 (C. 85 )])
- Community Radio Order 2004 (S.I. 2004 No. 1944)
- The Finance Act 2004, Section 85, (Commencement) Order 2004 (S.I. 2004 No. 1945 (C. 86 )])
- The Stansted Airport Aircraft Movement Limit (Revocation) Order 2004 (S.I. 2004 No. 1946)
- The European Qualifications (Health and Social Care Professions and Accession of New Member States) Regulations 2004 (S.I. 2004 No. 1947)
- The Motor Cycles Etc. (EC Type Approval) (Amendment) Regulations 2004 (S.I. 2004 No. 1948)
- The Summary Appeal Court (Navy) (Amendment) Rules 2004 (S.I. 2004 No. 1949)
- The Summary Appeal Court (Army) (Amendment) Rules 2004 (S.I. 2004 No. 1950)
- The Summary Appeal Court (Air Force) (Amendment) Rules 2004 (S.I. 2004 No. 1951)
- The Northern Ireland Act 1998 (Designation of Public Authorities) Order 2004 (S.I. 2004 No. 1957)
- The Single European Sky (National Supervisory Authority) Regulations 2004 (S.I. 2004 No. 1958)
- The Aggregates Levy (Northern Ireland Tax Credit) Regulations 2004 (S.I. 2004 No. 1959)
- The Representation of the People (Form of Canvass) (Scotland) Regulations 2004 (S.I. 2004 No. 1960 (S.7)])
- The Regional Assembly and Local Government Referendums (Expenses Limits for Permitted Participants) Order 2004 (S.I. 2004 No. 1961)
- The Regional Assembly and Local Government Referendums Order 2004 (S.I. 2004 No. 1962 )
- The Regional Assembly and Local Government Referendums (Date of Referendums, Referendum Question and Explanatory Material) (North East Region) Order 2004 (S.I. 2004 No. 1963)
- The Fur Farming (Compensation Scheme) (England) Order 2004 (S.I. 2004 No. 1964)
- The Education (Assisted Places) (Amendment) (England) Regulations 2004 (S.I. 2004 No. 1965)
- The Education (Assisted Places) (Incidental Expenses) (Amendment) (England) Regulations 2004 (S.I. 2004 No. 1970)
- The Beis Yaakov High School for Girls, Salford (Designation as having a Religious Character) Order 2004 (S.I. 2004 No. 1971)
- The Care Standards Act 2000 (Extension of the Application of Part 2 to Adult Placement Schemes) (England) Regulations 2004 (S.I. 2004 No. 1972)
- The Energy Act 2004 (Commencement No. 1) Order 2004 (S.I. 2004 No. 1973 (C. 87)])
- The Air Carrier Liability (No. 2) Regulations 2004 (S.I. 2004 No. 1974)
- The Contracting Out (Functions relating to Broadcast Advertising) and Specification of Relevant Functions Order 2004 (S.I. 2004 No. 1975)
- The Hovercraft (Fees) (Amendment) Regulations 2004 (S.I. 2004 No. 1976)
- The Merchant Shipping (Fees) (Amendment)Regulations 2004 (S.I. 2004 No. 1977)
- The Iraq (United Nations Sanctions) (Channel Islands) (Amendment) Order 2004 (S.I. 2004 No. 1978)
- The Burma (Restrictive Measures) (Overseas Territories) Order 2004 (S.I. 2004 No. 1979)
- The Sudan (Restrictive Measures) (Overseas Territories) (Amendment) Order 2004 (S.I. 2004 No. 1980)
- The Criminal Justice Act 1988 (Designated Countries and Territories) (Amendment) Order 2004 (S.I. 2004 No. 1981)
- The Iraq (United Nations Sanctions) (Isle of Man) (Amendment) Order 2004 (S.I. 2004 No. 1982)
- The Iraq (United Nations Sanctions) (Overseas Territories) (Amendment) Order 2004 (S.I. 2004 No. 1983)
- The European Communities (Designation)(No. 4) Order 2004 (S.I. 2004 No. 1984)
- The Maximum Number of Judges (Northern Ireland) Order 2004 (S.I. 2004 No. 1985)
- The Institution of Chemical Engineers (Charter Amendment) Order 2004 (S.I. 2004 No. 1986)
- The Age-Related Payments (Northern Ireland) Order 2004 (S.I. 2004 No. 1987 (N.I. 11)])
- The Anti-social Behaviour (Northern Ireland) Order 2004 (S.I. 2004 No. 1988 (N.I. 12)])
- The Solicitors (Amendment) (Northern Ireland) Order 2004 (S.I. 2004 No. 1989 (N.I. 13)])
- The Vehicle Testing (Temporary Exemptions) (Northern Ireland) Order 2004 (S.I. 2004 No. 1990 (N.I. 14)])
- The Criminal Justice (No. 2) (Northern Ireland) Order 2004 (S.I. 2004 No. 1991 (N.I. 15)])
- The Motor Vehicles (International Circulation) (Amendment) Order 2004 (S.I. 2004 No. 1992)
- The Dangerous Wild Animals (Northern Ireland) Order 2004 (S.I. 2004 No. 1993 (N.I. 16)])
- The Licensing (Indoor Arenas) (Northern Ireland) Order 2004 (S.I. 2004 No. 1994 (N.I. 17)])
- The Exempt Charities Order 2004 (S.I. 2004 No. 1995)
- The Budget (No. 2) (Northern Ireland) Order 2004 (S.I. 2004 No. 1996 (N.I. 18)])

== 2001–2100 ==
- The Transport and Works (Inquiries Procedure) Rules 2004 (S.I. 2004 No. 2018)
- The Cannington College (Dissolution) Order 2004 (S.I. 2004 No. 2024)
- The A4097 Trunk Road (M42 Junction 9, Dunton Interchange to M6 Toll Slip Road, Warwickshire) Order 2004 (S.I. 2004 No. 2027)
- The Road Traffic (Permitted Parking Area and Special Parking Area) (County of Lancashire) Order 2004 (S.I. 2004 No. 2028)
- The Cayman Islands (Constitution) (Amendment) Order 2004 (S.I. 2004 No. 2029)
- The Scotland Act 1998 (Transfer of Functions to the Scottish Ministers etc.) Order 2004 (S.I. 2004 No. 2030 (S. 8)])
- The European Convention on Cinematographic Co-production (Amendment) (No.2) Order 2004 (S.I. 2004 No. 2031)
- The Education (Inspectors of Schools in England) (No. 3) Order 2004 (S.I. 2004 No. 2032)
- The Health Professions (Operating Department Practitioners and Miscellaneous Amendments) Order 2004 (S.I. 2004 No. 2033)
- The Non-Road Mobile Machinery (Emission of Gaseous and Particulate Pollutants) (Amendment) Regulations 2004 (S.I. 2004 No. 2034)
- The Courts Act 2003 (Consequential Amendments) Order 2004 (S.I. 2004 No. 2035)
- The Sovereign Base Areas (Judicial Authorities) Order 2004 (S.I. 2004 No. 2036)
- The European Communities (Definition of Treaties) (Stabilisation and Association Agreement between the European Communities and their Member States, and the Republic of Croatia) Order 2004 (S.I. 2004 No. 2037)
- The Air Navigation (Overseas Territories) (Amendment) Order 2004 (S.I. 2004 No. 2038)
- The Food Protection (Emergency Prohibitions) (Scallops) (Irish Sea) Order 2004 (S.I. 2004 No. 2040)
- The Education (Student Support) (No. 2) Regulations 2002 (Amendment) (No. 3) Regulations 2004 (S.I. 2004 No. 2041)
- The School Governance (Federations) (England) Regulations 2004 (S.I. 2004 No. 2042)
- The Gas (Third Party Access) Regulations 2004 (S.I. 2004 No. 2043)
- The Local Authorities (Capital Finance) (Further Consequential and Saving Provisions) Order 2004 (S.I. 2004 No. 2044)
- The Criminal Defence Service (Funding) (Amendment) Order 2004 (S.I. 2004 No. 2045)
- The Criminal Defence Service (General) (No.2) (Amendment No.2) Regulations 2004 (S.I. 2004 No. 2046)
- The Fylde (Parish) Order 2004 (S.I. 2004 No. 2047)
- The Other Fuel Substitutes (Rates of Excise Duty etc.) (Amendment) Order 2004 (S.I. 2004 No. 2062)
- The Excise Duties (Surcharges or Rebates) (Hydrocarbon Oils etc.) Order 2004 (S.I. 2004 No. 2063)
- The Excise Warehousing (Energy Products) Regulations 2004 (S.I. 2004 No. 2064)
- The Biofuels and Other Fuel Substitutes (Payment of Excise Duties etc.) Regulations 2004 (S.I. 2004 No. 2065)
- The Courts Act 2003 (Commencement No. 6 and Savings) Order 2004 (S.I. 2004 No.2066 (C.88)])
- The Competition Appeal Tribunal (Amendment and Communications Act Appeals) Rules 2004 (S.I. 2004 No. 2068)
- The Excise Duties (Road Fuel Gas) (Reliefs) Regulations 2004 (S.I. 2004 No. 2069)
- The Care Standards Act 2000 (Extension of Protection of Vulnerable Adults Scheme) Regulations 2004 (S.I. 2004 No.2070)
- The Adult Placement Schemes (England) Regulations 2004 (S.I. 2004 No. 2071)
- The Civil Procedure (Amendment No.2) Rules 2004 (S.I. 2004 No. 2072 (L. 11 )])
- The Protection of Children and Vulnerable Adults and Care Standards Tribunal (Amendment) Regulations 2004 (S.I. 2004 No.2073)
- The A47 Trunk Road (Leicester to A1) (Detrunking) Order 2004 (S.I. 2004 No. 2088)
- The Designation of Schools Having a Religious Character (Independent Schools) (England) (No. 5) Order 2004 (S.I. 2004 No. 2089)
- The Capital Allowances (Energy-saving Plant and Machinery) (Amendment) Order 2004 (S.I. 2004 No. 2093)
- The Capital Allowances (Environmentally Beneficial Plant and Machinery) (Amendment) Order 2004 (S.I. 2004 No. 2094)
- The Financial Services (Distance Marketing) Regulations 2004 (S.I. 2004 No. 2095)
- The Social Security (Contributions) (Amendment No. 4) Regulations 2004 (S.I. 2004 No. 2096)
- The Planning and Compulsory Purchase Act 2004 (Commencement No.1) Order 2004 (S.I. 2004 No. 2097 (C. 89 )])
- The County Court Fees (Amendment) Order 2004 (S.I. 2004 No. 2098 (L. 12 )])
- The Road Vehicles (Registration and Licensing) (Amendment) (No. 4) Regulations 2004 (S.I. 2004 No. 2099)
- The Supreme Court Fees (Amendment) Order 2004 (S.I. 2004 No. 2100 (L. 13 )])

== 2101–2200 ==
- The Rent Officers (Housing Benefit Functions) (Student Accommodation) Amendment Order 2004 (S.I. 2004 No. 2101)
- The Road Vehicles (Construction and Use) (Amendment) (No.2) Regulations 2004 (S.I. 2004 No. 2102)
- The Family Proceedings Fees (Amendment) Order 2004 (S.I. 2004 No. 2103 (L. 14 )])
- The Regional Assembly and Local Government Referendums (Counting Officers' Charges) Order 2004 (S.I. 2004 No. 2105)
- The Motor Vehicles (Type Approval and Approval Marks) (Fees) (Amendment) Regulations 2004 (S.I. 2004 No. 2106)
- The British Nationality (General) (Amendment No. 2) Regulations 2004 (S.I. 2004 No. 2109)
- The Merchant Shipping (Vessel Traffic Monitoring and Reporting Requirements) Regulations 2004 (S.I. 2004 No. 2110)
- The Road Traffic (Permitted Parking Area and Special Parking Area) (County of East Sussex) (District of Lewes) Order 2004 (S.I. 2004 No. 2111)
- The Food Protection (Emergency Prohibitions) (Scallops) (Irish Sea) (Amendment) Order 2004 (S.I. 2004 No. 2123)
- The Education (School Performance Information) (England) (Amendment) Regulations 2004 (S.I. 2004 No. 2141)
- The Education (School Teachers' Pay and Conditions) (No.2) Order 2004 (S.I. 2004 No. 2142)
- The Veterinary Surgeons (Registration Appeals) Rules Order of Council 2004 (S.I. 2004 No. 2143)
- The Food Safety (Act of Accession concerning the Czech Republic and other States) (Consequential Amendments) (England) Regulations 2004 (S.I. 2004 No.2145)
- The Feeding Stuffs (Sampling and Analysis) (Amendment) (England) Regulations 2004 (S.I. 2004 No. 2146)
- The National Clinical Assessment Authority (Establishment and Constitution) Amendment Order 2004 (S.I. 2004 No. 2147)
- The Rail Vehicle Accessibility (South West Trains Class 458 Vehicles) Exemption (Amendment) Order 2004 (S.I. 2004 No. 2149)
- The Rail Vehicle Accessibility (Gatwick Express Class 460 Vehicles) Exemption (Amendment) Order 2004 (S.I. 2004 No. 2150)
- The Merchant Shipping (Additional Safety Measures for Bulk Carriers) (Amendment) Regulations 2004 (S.I. 2004 No. 2151)
- The Cosmetic Products (Safety) Regulations 2004 (S.I. 2004 No. 2152)
- The Social Fund Winter Fuel Payment (Amendment) Regulations 2004 (S.I. 2004 No. 2154)
- The A696/A68 Trunk Road (Prestwick Road End to Carter Bar) (Detrunking) Order 2004 (S.I. 2004 No. 2155)
- The Criminal Justice Act 1988 (Commencement No. 14) Order 2004 (S.I. 2004 No. 2167 (C. 90 )])
- The Anti-social Behaviour Act 2003 (Commencement No. 4) Order 2004 (S.I. 2004 No. 2168 (C. 91 )])
- The Fishing Vessels (Safety Training) (Amendment) Regulations 2004 (S.I. 2004 No.2169)
- The Criminal Justice and Court Services Act 2000 (Commencement No. 13) Order 2004 (S.I. 2004 No. 2171 (C.92 )])
- The Exclusion Order (Monitoring of Offenders) Order 2004 (S.I. 2004 No. 2172)
- The Countryside and Rights of Way Act 2000 (Commencement No. 5) Order 2004 (S.I. 2004 No. 2173 (C. 93 )])
- The Income Support (General) (Standard Interest Rate Amendment) (No.3) Regulations 2004 (S.I. 2004 No. 2174)
- The Street Works (Charges for Occupation of the Highway) (England) (Revocation) Order 2004 (S.I. 2004 No. 2175)
- The Patents Act 2004 (Commencement No. 1 and Consequential and Transitional Provisions) Order 2004 (S.I. 2004 No. 2177 (C. 94 )])
- The Agricultural Wages (Abolition of Permits to Incapacitated Persons) Regulations 2004 (S.I. 2004 No. 2178)
- The Rail Vehicle Accessibility (Hull Trains Class 222) Exemption Order 2004 (S.I. 2004 No.2180)
- The Enterprise Act 2002 (Enforcement Undertakings and Orders) Order 2004 (S.I. 2004 No.2181)
- The Energy Act 2004 (Commencement No. 2) Order 2004 (S.I. 2004 No.2184 (C. 95 )])
- The Employment Act 2002 (Commencement No. 7) Order 2004 (S.I. 2004 No. 2185 (C. 96 )])
- The Motor Vehicles (EC Type Approval) (Amendment) (No. 2) Regulations 2004 (S.I. 2004 No. 2186)
- The Children and Family Court Advisory and Support Service (Reviewed Case Referral) Regulations 2004 (S.I. 2004 No. 2187)
- The Road Traffic (Permitted Parking Area and Special Parking Area) (County of Hampshire) (Borough of Eastleigh) Order 2004 (S.I. 2004 No.2188)
- The Insurance Companies (Taxation of Reinsurance Business)(Amendment) Regulations 2004 (S.I. 2004 No. 2189)
- The Associated British Ports (Immingham Outer Harbour) Harbour Revision Order 2004 (S.I. 2004 No. 2190)
- The Private Security Industry Act 2001 (Commencement No. 4) Order 2004 (S.I. 2004 No. 2191 (C. 97 )])
- The Hertfordshire (Coroners' Districts) Order 2004 (S.I. 2004 No. 2192)
- The Road Traffic (Permitted Parking Area and Special Parking Area) (County of Warwickshire) (District of Stratford on Avon) Order 2004 (S.I. 2004 No. 2193)
- The Road Traffic (Permitted Parking Area and Special Parking Area) (County of Essex) (Tendring, Rochford, Uttlesford, Braintree and Castle Point) Order 2004 (S.I. 2004 No. 2194)
- The Courts Act 2003 (Commencement No.7) Order 2004 (S.I. 2004 No. 2195 (C. 98 )])
- The Discharge of Fines by Unpaid Work (Prescribed Hourly Sum) Regulations 2004 (S.I. 2004 No. 2196)
- The Discharge of Fines by Unpaid Work (Issue of Summons) Regulations 2004 (S.I. 2004 No. 2197)
- The Discharge of Fines by Unpaid Work (Pilot Schemes) Order 2004 (S.I. 2004 No. 2198)
- The Venture Capital Trust (Winding up and Mergers) (Tax) Regulations 2004 (S.I. 2004 No. 2199)
- The Overseas Life Insurance Companies Regulations 2004 (S.I. 2004 No.2200)

== 2201–2300 ==
- The Finance Act 2002, Schedule 26, Parts 2 and 9 (Amendment) Order 2004 (S.I. 2004 No. 2201)
- The Planning and Compulsory Purchase Act 2004 (Commencement No.2, Transitional Provisions and Savings) Order 2004 (S.I. 2004 No. 2202(C.99)])
- The Town and Country Planning (Regional Planning) (England) Regulations 2004 (S.I. 2004 No. 2203)
- The Town and Country Planning (Local Development) (England) Regulations 2004 (S.I. 2004 No. 2204)
- The Town and Country Planning (Transitional Arrangements) (England) Regulations 2004 (S.I. 2004 No. 2205)
- The Town and Country Planning (Initial Regional Spatial Strategy)(England) Regulations 2004 (S.I. 2004 No. 2206)
- The Town and Country Planning (Regions)(National Parks)(England) Order 2004 (S.I. 2004 No. 2207)
- The Town and Country Planning (Regional Planning Guidance as Revision of Regional Spatial Strategy) Order 2004 (S.I. 2004 No. 2208)
- The Town and Country Planning (Regional Spatial Strategies) (Examinations in Public)(Remuneration and Allowances)(England) Regulations 2004 (S.I. 2004 No. 2209)
- The Planning (Listed Buildings and Conservation Areas) (Amendment) (England) Regulations 2004 (S.I. 2004 No. 2210)
- The Local Authorities (Functions and Responsibilities) (Amendment) (No. 2) (England) Regulations 2004 (S.I. 2004 No. 2211)
- The Road Traffic (Permitted Parking Area and Special Parking Area) (County of Hertfordshire) (City and District of St Albans) Order 2004 (S.I. 2004 No. 2212)
- The Coal Mining Subsidence (Subsidence Adviser) (Revocation) Regulations 2004 (S.I. 2004 No. 2241)
- The Energy Act 2004 (Designation of System Operator) Order 2004 (S.I. 2004 No.2242)
- The Gaming Duty (Amendment) Regulations 2004 (S.I. 2004 No. 2243)
- The Social Security (Quarterly Work-focused Interviews for Certain Lone Parents) Regulations 2004 (S.I. 2004 No. 2244)
- The Potatoes Originating in Egypt (Wales) Regulations 2004 (S.I. 2004 No. 2245 (W.209))
- Rheoliadau Tatws sy'n Tarddu o'r Aifft (Cymru) 2004 (S.I. 2004 Rhif 2245 (Cy.209))
- The Social Security (Contributions) (Amendment No. 5) Regulations 2004 (S.I. 2004 No. 2246)
- The Distraint by Authorised Officers (Fees, Costs and Charges) (Northern Ireland) Regulations 2004 (S.I. 2004 No. 2247)
- The Primary Care Trusts (Establishment) (Amendment No.3) Order 2004 (S.I. 2004 No. 2248)
- The Public Service Vehicles (Registration of Local Services) (Amendment) (England and Wales) (No.2) Regulations 2004 (S.I. 2004 No. 2250)
- The Minibus and Other Section 19 Permit Buses (Amendment) Regulations 2004 (S.I. 2004 No. 2251)
- The Community Bus (Amendment) Regulations 2004 (S.I. 2004 No. 2252)
- The Review of Children's Cases (Amendment No.2 and Transitional Arrangements) (England) Regulations 2004 (S.I. 2004 No. 2253)
- The Tonnage Tax (Training Requirement) (Amendment) Regulations 2004 (S.I. 2004 No. 2255)
- The Insurance Companies (Taxation of Reinsurance Business) (Amendment No. 2) Regulations 2004 (S.I. 2004 No. 2257)
- The Merchant Shipping (Life-Saving Appliances For Ships Other Than Ships of Classes III to VI(A)) (Amendment) Regulations 2004 (S.I. 2004 No. 2259)
- The Road Traffic (Permitted Parking Area and Special Parking Area) (Borough of Blackburn with Darwen) Order 2004 (S.I. 2004 No. 2260)
- The Primary Medical Services (Scotland) Act 2004 (Consequential Amendments) Order 2004 (S.I. 2004 No. 2261)
- The Religious Character of Schools (Designation Procedure) (Independent Schools) (England) (Amendment) Regulations 2004 (S.I. 2004 No. 2262)
- The Road Traffic (Permitted Parking Area and Special Parking Area) (County of Worcestershire) (District of Wychavon) Order 2004 (S.I. 2004 No. 2263)
- The Social Security (Retirement Pensions) Amendment Regulations 2004 (S.I. 2004 No. 2283)
- The Disability Discrimination Codes of Practice (Employment and Trade Organisations) Revocation Order 2004 (S.I. 2004 No. 2300)

== 2301–2400 ==
- The Social Security (Incapacity) (Miscellaneous Amendments) Regulations 2004 (S.I. 2004 No.2301)
- The Disability Discrimination Codes of Practice (Employment and Occupation, and Trade Organisations and Qualifications Bodies) Appointed Day Order 2004 (S.I. 2004 No. 2302)
- The Housing Benefit and Council Tax Benefit (Miscellaneous Amendments) (No. 2) Regulations 2004 (S.I. 2004 No. 2303)
- The Fire and Rescue Services Act 2004 (Commencement) (England and Scotland) Order 2004 (S.I. 2004 No. 2304(C.100)])
- The Fire and Rescue Services (England) Order 2004 (S.I. 2004 No.2305)
- The Firefighters' Pension Scheme (England and Scotland) Order 2004 (S.I. 2004 No. 2306)
- Local Government (Best Value Authorities) (Power to Trade) (England) (Amendment) Order 2004 (S.I. 2004 No. 2307)
- The Social Security (Miscellaneous Amendments) (No. 3) Regulations 2004 (S.I. 2004 No. 2308)
- The Terrorism (United Nations Measures) Order 2001 (Amendment) Regulations 2004 (S.I. 2004 No. 2309)
- The Finance Act 2004, Sections 38 to 40 and 45 and Schedule 6 (Consequential Amendment of Enactments) Order 2004 (S.I. 2004 No. 2310)
- The Welfare Food (Amendment No. 2) Regulations 2004 (S.I. 2004 No. 2311)
- The Enterprise Act 2002 (Insolvency) Order 2004 (S.I. 2004 No.2312)
- The Education (Modification of Enactments Relating to Employment) (England) (Amendment) Order 2004 (S.I. 2004 No. 2325)
- The European Public Limited-Liability Company Regulations 2004 (S.I. 2004 No. 2326)
- The Social Security (Housing Benefit, Council Tax Benefit, State Pension Credit and Miscellaneous Amendments) Regulations 2004 (S.I. 2004 No. 2327)
- The National Assistance (Assessment of Resources) (Amendment) (No. 2) (England) Regulations 2004 (S.I. 2004 No.2328)
- The Discretionary Housing Payments (Grants) Amendment Order 2004 (S.I. 2004 No.2329)
- The Common Agricultural Policy Support Schemes (Modulation) (Amendment) Regulations 2004 (S.I. 2004 No.2330)
- The Trade Marks (International Registrations Designating the European Community, etc.) Regulations 2004 (S.I. 2004 No. 2332)
- The ACAS (Flexible Working) Arbitration Scheme (Great Britain) Order 2004 (S.I. 2004 No. 2333)
- The Genetically Modified Animal Feed (England) Regulations 2004 (S.I. 2004 No. 2334)
- The Genetically Modified Food (England) Regulations 2004 (S.I. 2004 No. 2335)
- The Employment Tribunals (Constitution and Rules of Procedure) (Amendment) Regulations 2004 (S.I. 2004 No. 2351)
- The Equal Pay Act 1970 (Amendment) Regulations 2004 (S.I. 2004 No. 2352)
- The Premium Savings Bonds (Amendment etc.) Regulations 2004 (S.I. 2004 No. 2353)
- The Police Pensions (Amendment) (No. 3) Regulations 2004 (S.I. 2004 No. 2354)
- The Town and Country Planning (London Borough of Camden) Special Development (Amendment) Order 2004 (S.I. 2004 No. 2355)
- The Employment Code of Practice (Disciplinary and Grievance Procedures) Order 2004 (S.I. 2004 No. 2356)
- The Regulatory Reform (Patents) Order 2004 (S.I. 2004 No. 2357)
- The Patents (Amendment) Rules 2004 (S.I. 2004 No. 2358)
- The Regulatory Reform (Local Commissioner for Wales) Order 2004 (S.I. 2004 No. 2359)
- Licensing Act 2003 (Commencement No. 5) Order 2004 (S.I. 2004 No. 2360 (C.101)])
- The Licensing Act 2003 (Licensing statement period) Order 2004 (S.I. 2004 No. 2362)
- The Non Commercial Movement of Pet Animals (England) Regulations 2004 (S.I. 2004 No. 2363)
- The Rabies (Importation of Dogs, Cats and Other Mammals) (England) (Amendment) Order 2004 (S.I. 2004 No. 2364)
- The Plant Health (Amendment) (England) Order 2004 (S.I. 2004 No. 2365)
- The Traffic Management Act 2004 (Commencement No. 1 and Transitional Provision) (England) Order 2004 (S.I. 2004 No. 2380 (C.102)])
- The Beet Seed (England) (Amendment) Regulations 2004 (S.I. 2004 No. 2385)
- The Cereal Seed (England) (Amendment) Regulations 2004 (S.I. 2004 No. 2386)
- The Fodder Plant Seed (England) (Amendment) Regulations 2004 (S.I. 2004 No. 2387)
- The Oil and Fibre Plant Seed (England) (Amendment) Regulations 2004 (S.I. 2004 No. 2388)
- The Vegetable Seed (England) (Amendment) Regulations 2004 (S.I. 2004 No. 2389)
- The Seed (Registration, Licensing and Enforcement) (England) (Amendment) Regulations 2004 (S.I. 2004 No. 2390)
- The Aintree Hospitals National Health Service Trust (Establishment) Amendment Order 2004 (S.I. 2004 No. 2391)
- The London Ambulance Service National Health Service Trust (Establishment) Amendment Order 2004 (S.I. 2004 No. 2394)
- The Protection of Wrecks (Designation) (England) Order 2004 (S.I. 2004 No. 2395)
- The Community Health Sheffield National Health Service Trust (Establishment) Amendment Order 2004 (S.I. 2004 No. 2397)

== 2401–2500 ==
- The Chemical Weapons (Notification) (Amendment) Regulations 2004 (S.I. 2004 No. 2406)
- The European Public Limited-Liability Company (Fees) Regulations 2004 (S.I. 2004 No. 2407)
- The Costs in Criminal Cases (General)(Amendment) Regulations 2004 (S.I. 2004 No. 2408)
- The Football Spectators (Prescription) Order 2004 (S.I. 2004 No. 2409)
- The Football (Offences) (Designation of Football Matches) Order 2004 (S.I. 2004 No. 2410)
- The Genetically Modified Organisms (Deliberate Release) (Amendment) Regulations 2004 (S.I. 2004 No. 2411)
- The Genetically Modified Organisms (Traceability and Labelling) (England) Regulations 2004 (S.I. 2004 No. 2412)
- The Care Standards Act 2000 and the Children Act 1989 (Amendment of Miscellaneous Regulations) (Wales) Regulations 2004 (S.I. 2004 No. 2414 (W.222))
- Rheoliadau Deddf Safonau Gofal 2000 a Deddf Plant 1989 (Diwygio Rheoliadau Amrywiol) (Cymru) 2004 (S.I. 2004 Rhif 2414 (Cy.222))
- The Child Support (Miscellaneous Amendments) Regulations 2004 (S.I. 2004 No. 2415)
- The Parliamentary Pensions (Amendment) Regulations 2004 (S.I. 2004 No. 2416)
- The Parliamentary Pensions (Additional Voluntary Contributions Scheme) (Amendment) Regulations 2004 (S.I. 2004 No. 2417)
- The European Parliamentary (United Kingdom Representatives) Pensions (Additional Voluntary Contributions Scheme) (Amendment) Order 2004 (S.I. 2004 No. 2418)
- The Magistrates' Courts (Reports Relating to Adult Witnesses) Rules 2004 (S.I. 2004 No. 2419 (L. 15)])
- The Crown Court (Reports Relating to Adult Witnesses) Rules 2004 (S.I. 2004 No. 2420 (L. 16)])
- The Stamp Duty and Stamp Duty Reserve Tax (Extension of Exceptions relating to Recognised Exchanges) Regulations 2004 (S.I. 2004 No. 2421)
- The Child Trust Funds Act 2004 (Commencement No. 1) Order 2004 (S.I. 2004 No. 2422 (C.103)])
- The Road Traffic (Permitted Parking Area and Special Parking Area) (County of Cambridgeshire) (City of Cambridge) Order 2004 (S.I. 2004 No. 2424)
- The Youth Justice and Criminal Evidence Act 1999 (Commencement No. 10) (England and Wales) Order 2004 (S.I. 2004 No. 2428 (C. 104)])
- The Tax Avoidance Schemes (Prescribed Descriptions of Arrangements) (Amendment) Regulations 2004 (S.I. 2004 No. 2429)
- The Home Energy Efficiency Scheme (England) (Amendment) Regulations 2004 (S.I. 2004 No. 2430)
- The Business Improvement Districts (England) Regulations 2004 (S.I. 2004 No. 2443)
- The Wigan Borough Council (Henhurst Canal Bridge) Scheme 2003 Confirmation Instrument 2004 (S.I. 2004 No. 2447)
- The Fishing Boats (Satellite-Tracking Devices) (England) Scheme 2004 (S.I. 2004 No. 2467)
- The Penalties for Disorderly Behaviour (Amount of Penalty) (Amendment No.2) Order 2004 (S.I. 2004 No. 2468)
- The Teignmouth Quays Harbour Revision Order 2004 (S.I. 2004 No. 2469)
- The Student Fees (Approved Plans) (England) Regulations 2004 (S.I. 2004 No. 2473)
- The All Saints' Catholic Voluntary Aided Primary School (Designation as having a Religious Character) Order 2004 (S.I. 2004 No. 2474)
- The Local Authorities (Goods and Services) (Public Bodies) (England) (No.2) Order 2004 (S.I. 2004 No. 2475)
- The Bishop Ridley Church of England V A Primary School (Designation as having a Religious Character) Order 2004 (S.I. 2004 No. 2476)
- The Kirkdale St Lawrence CofE Primary School (Designation as having a Religious Character) Order 2004 (S.I. 2004 No. 2477)
- The Trinity Catholic Primary School (Designation as having a Religious Character) Order 2004 (S.I. 2004 No. 2478)

== 2501–2600 ==
- The Corporation Tax (Notice of Coming within Charge — Information) Regulations 2004 (S.I. 2004 No. 2502)
- The Northern Ireland Act 2000 (Modification) (No. 2) Order 2004 (S.I. 2004 No. 2505)
- The Schools Budget Shares (Wales) Regulations 2004 (S.I. 2004 No. 2506 (W.224))
- Rheoliadau Cyfrannau Cyllideb Ysgolion (Cymru) 2004 (S.I. 2004 Rhif 2506 (Cy.224))
- The Education (LEA Financial Schemes) (Wales) Regulations 2004 (S.I. 2004 No. 2507 (W.225))
- Rheoliadau Addysg (Cynlluniau Ariannol AALl) (Cymru) 2004 (S.I. 2004 Rhif 2507 (Cy.225))
- The Compromise Agreements (Description of Person) Order 2004 (Amendment) Order 2004 (S.I. 2004 No.2515)
- The Working Time Regulations 1998 (Amendment) Regulations 2004 (S.I. 2004 No. 2516)
- The Cambridge University Hospitals National Health Service Foundation Trust (Trust Funds: Appointment of Trustees) Order 2004 (S.I. 2004 No. 2517)
- The Transnational Information and Consultation of Employees Regulations 1999 (Amendment) Regulations 2004 (S.I. 2004 No. 2518)
- The Employment Equality (Sexual Orientation) Regulations 2003 (Amendment) Regulations 2004 (S.I. 2004 No. 2519)
- The Employment Equality (Religion or Belief) Regulations 2003 (Amendment) (No.2) Regulations 2004 (S.I. 2004 No. 2520)
- The Education Act 1996 (Electronic Communications) Order 2004 (S.I. 2004 No. 2521)
- Health Professions (Parts of and Entries in the Register) (Amendment) Order of Council 2004 (S.I. 2004 No. 2522)
- The Asylum and Immigration (Treatment of Claimants, etc.) Act 2004 (Commencement No. 1) Order 2004 (S.I. 2004 No. 2523 (C. 105)])
- The Health Professions Council (Registration and Fees) (Amendment) Rules Order of Council 2004 (S.I. 2004 No. 2524)
- The Health Professions Order 2001 (Transitional Provisions) Order of Council 2004 (S.I. 2004 No. 2525)
- The Employment Appeal Tribunal (Amendment) Rules 2004 (S.I. 2004 No. 2526)
- The Water Act 2003 (Commencement No. 2, Transitional Provisions and Savings) Order 2004 (S.I. 2004 No. 2528 (C. 106)])
- The Social Fund Maternity and Funeral Expenses (General) Amendment Regulations 2004 (S.I. 2004 No. 2536)
- The Motor Cycles Etc. (EC Type Approval) (Amendment) (No.2) Regulations 2004 (S.I. 2004 No. 2539)
- The Criminal Justice and Police Act 2001 (Amendment) and Police Reform Act 2002 (Modification) Order 2004 (S.I. 2004 No. 2540)
- The Electricity (Applications for Licences, Modification of an Area and Extensions and Restrictions of Licences) Regulations 2004 (S.I. 2004 No. 2541)
- The Gas (Applications for Licences and Extensions and Restrictions of Licences) Regulations 2004 (S.I. 2004 No. 2542)
- The Inheritance Tax (Delivery of Accounts) (Excepted Estates) Regulations 2004 (S.I. 2004 No. 2543)
- The Local Authorities (Allowances for Members of Fire Authorities) (Wales) Regulations 2004 (S.I. 2004 No. 2555 (W.227))
- Rheoliadau Awdurdodau Lleol (Lwfansau i Aelodau Awdurdodau Tân) (Cymru) 2004 (S.I. 2004 Rhif 2555 (Cy.227))
- The Northern Ireland Act 2000 (Prescribed Documents) Order 2004 (S.I. 2004 No. 2556)
- The Anti-social Behaviour Act 2003 (Commencement No.2 and Savings) (Wales) Order 2004 (S.I. 2004 No. 2557 (W.228) (C.107))
- Gorchymyn Deddf Ymddygiad Gwrthgymdeithasol 2003 (Cychwyn Rhif 2 ac Arbed) (Cymru) 2004 (S.I. 2004 Rhif 2557 (Cy.228) (C.107))
- The Food Labelling (Amendment) (Wales) Regulations 2004 (S.I. 2004 No. 2558 (W.229))
- Rheoliadau Labelu Bwyd (Diwygio) (Cymru) 2004 (S.I. 2004 Rhif 2558 (Cy.229))
- The Pesticides (Maximum Residue Levels in Crops, Food and Feeding Stuffs) (England and Wales) (Amendment) (No. 3) Regulations 2004 (S.I. 2004 No. 2559)
- The Export of Goods, Transfer of Technology and Provision of Technical Assistance (Control) (Amendment No.2) Order 2004 (S.I. 2004 No. 2561)
- The M25 Motorway (M25 Junction 2 Improvement) (M25 to A282 Section and Connecting Road) Scheme 2004 (S.I. 2004 No. 2562)
- The A2/A282 Trunk Roads (M25 Junction 2 Improvement) Slip Roads Order 2004 (S.I. 2004 No. 2563)
- The St Michael's Church of England High School (Designation as having a Religious Character) Order 2004 (S.I. 2004 No. 2564)
- The Ainsdale Hope Church of England High School (Designation as having a Religious Character) Order 2004 (S.I. 2004 No. 2565)
- The Employment Relations Act 2004 (Commencement No.1 and Transitional Provisions) Order 2004 (S.I. 2004 No. 2566 (C. 108)])
- The Fal and Helford (Prohibition of Scallop Dredging) Order 2004 (S.I. 2004 No. 2567)
- The Finance Act 2004, Section 294 (Appointed Day) Order 2004 (S.I. 2004 No. 2571 (C. 109)])
- The Offshore Funds Regulations 2004 (S.I. 2004 No. 2572)
- Local Government (Best Value Authorities) (Power to Trade) (England) (Amendment No. 2) Order 2004 (S.I. 2004 No.2573)
- The Liberia (Freezing of Funds and Economic Resources) (Amendment No. 2) Regulations 2004 (S.I. 2004 No. 2574)
- The Energy Act 2004 (Commencement No. 3) Order 2004 (S.I. 2004 No. 2575 (C.110)])
- The Immigration (Leave to Remain) (Prescribed Forms and Procedures) (Amendment No. 2) Regulations 2004 (S.I. 2004 No. 2576)
- The Goods Vehicles (Evidence of Test Certificates) Regulations 2004 (S.I. 2004 No. 2577)
- The Channel Tunnel (Miscellaneous Provisions) (Amendment) Order 2004 (S.I. 2004 No. 2589)
- The Plant Health (Phytophthora ramorum) (England) Order 2004 (S.I. 2004 No. 2590)
- The Private Security Industry Act 2001 (Commencement No. 5) Order 2004 (S.I. 2004 No. 2591 (C. 111 )])
- The Police Act 1997 (Criminal Records) (Amendment) (No. 3) Regulations 2004 (S.I. 2004 No. 2592)
- The Planning and Compulsory Purchase Act 2004 (Commencement No. 3) Order 2004 (S.I. 2004 No. 2593 (C.112)])
- The Compulsory Purchase of Land (Written Representations Procedure) (Ministers) Regulations 2004 (S.I. 2004 No. 2594)
- The Compulsory Purchase of Land (Prescribed Forms) (Ministers) Regulations 2004 (S.I. 2004 No. 2595)
- The Local Authorities (Members' Allowances) (England) (Amendment) Regulations 2004 (S.I. 2004 No. 2596)
- The Education (Student Support) (No. 2) Regulations 2002 (Amendment) (No. 4) Regulations 2004 (S.I. 2004 No. 2598)
- The Common Agricultural Policy (Wine) (Wales) (Amendment) Regulations 2004 (S.I. 2004 No. 2599 (W.232))
- Rheoliadau'r Polisi Amaethyddol Cyffredin (Gwin) (Cymru) (Diwygio) 2004 (S.I. 2004 Rhif 2599 (Cy.232))
- The Social Fund Cold Weather Payments (General) Amendment Regulations 2004 (S.I. 2004 No. 2600)

== 2601–2700 ==
- The Miscellaneous Food Additives (Amendment) (England) Regulations 2004 (S.I. 2004 No.2601)
- The Marketing of Fruit Plant Material (Amendment) (England) Regulations 2004 (S.I. 2004 No. 2603)
- The Horticultural Produce (Community Grading Rules) (England and Wales) (Revocation) Regulations 2004 (S.I. 2004 No.2604)
- The Leicestershire Partnership National Health Service Trust (Transfer of Trust Property) Order 2004 (S.I. 2004 No. 2605)
- The Northamptonshire Healthcare National Health Service Trust (Transfer of Trust Property) Order 2004 (S.I. 2004 No. 2606)
- The General Medical Council (Fitness to Practise) (Disqualifying Decisions and Determinations by Regulatory Bodies) Procedure Rules Order of Council 2004 (S.I. 2004 No. 2607)
- The General Medical Council (Fitness to Practise) Rules Order of Council 2004 (S.I. 2004 No. 2608)
- The General Medical Council (Voluntary Erasure and Restoration following Voluntary Erasure) Regulations Order of Council 2004 (S.I. 2004 No. 2609)
- The Medical Act 1983 (Amendment) Order 2002 (Transitional Provision) Order of Council 2004 (S.I. 2004 No. 2610)
- The General Medical Council (Constitution of Panels and Investigation Committee) Rules Order of Council 2004 (S.I. 2004 No. 2611)
- The General Medical Council (Restoration following Administrative Erasure) Regulations Order of Council 2004 (S.I. 2004 No. 2612)
- The Tax Avoidance Schemes (Promoters, Prescribed Circumstances and Information) (Amendment) Regulations 2004 (S.I. 2004 No. 2613)
- The Financial Services and Markets Act 2000 (TransitionalProvisions) (Mortgages) Order 2004 (S.I. 2004 No. 2615)
- The Road Traffic (Permitted Parking Area and Special Parking Area) (County of Surrey) (Borough of Runnymede) Order 2004 (S.I. 2004 No.2616)
- The Local Authorities (Code of Conduct) (Local Determination) (Amendment) Regulations 2004 (S.I. 2004 No.2617)
- The Standards Board for England (Functions) Order 2004 (S.I. 2004 No. 2618)
- The Consumer Credit (Miscellaneous Amendments) Regulations 2004 (S.I. 2004 No. 2619)
- The Limited Liability Partnerships (Fees) Regulations 2004 (S.I. 2004 No. 2620)
- The Companies (Fees) Regulations 2004 (S.I. 2004 No. 2621)
- The Exemption From Tax For Certain Interest Payments Regulations 2004 (S.I. 2004 No. 2622)
- The A66 Trunk Road (Temple Sowerby Bypass and Improvements at Winderwath) (Detrunking) Order 2004 (S.I. 2004 No. 2623)
- The Crime (International Co-operation) Act 2003 (Commencement No. 2) Order 2004 (S.I. 2004 No. 2624 (C.113)])
- The General Medical Council (Legal Assessors) Rules 2004 (S.I. 2004 No.2625)
- The Health and Social Care (Community Health and Standards) Act 2003 Commencement (No. 4) Order 2004 (S.I. 2004 No.2626 (C. 114 )])
- The Health and Social Care (Community Health and Standards) Act 2003 (Consequential Provisions – Appointments) Order 2004 (S.I. 2004 No. 2627)
- The Products of Animal Origin (Third Country Imports) (England) (No. 3) Regulations 2004 (S.I. 2004 No. 2640)
- The Offshore Installations (Safety Zones) (No. 4) Order 2004 (S.I. 2004 No. 2641)
- The European Communities (Designation) (No. 5) Order 2004 (S.I. 2004 No. 2642)
- The European Economic Interest Grouping (Fees) Regulations 2004 (S.I. 2004 No. 2643)
- The Police Federation (Amendment) Regulations 2004 (S.I. 2004 No. 2660)
- The Olive Oil (Marketing Standards) (Amendment) Regulations 2004 (S.I. 2004 No. 2661)
- The Common Agricultural Policy Support Schemes (Modulation)(Wales) (Amendment) Regulations 2004 (S.I. 2004 No. 2662 (W.233))
- Rheoliadau Cynlluniau Cymorth y Polisi Amaethyddol Cyffredin (Modwleiddio) (Cymru) (Diwygio) 2004 (S.I. 2004 Rhif 2662 (Cy.233))
- The Tax Credits (Miscellaneous Amendments No. 3) Regulations 2004 (S.I. 2004 No. 2663)
- The Energy-Saving Items (Deductions for Expenditure etc.) Regulations 2004 (S.I. 2004 No.2664)
- The Service Charges (Consultation Requirements) (Amendment) (England) Regulations 2004 (S.I. 2004 No. 2665)
- The A5195 Trunk Road (Birmingham Northern Relief Road Link Road) (Detrunking) Order 2004 (S.I. 2004 No. 2666)
- The Renewable Energy Zone (Designation of Area) Order 2004 (S.I. 2004 No. 2668)
- The Pitcairn Court of Appeal (Amendment) Order 2004 (S.I. 2004 No. 2669)
- The Parliamentary Commissioner Order 2004 (S.I. 2004 No. 2670)
- The Iraq (United Nations Sanctions) (Overseas Territories) (Amendment) (No. 2) Order 2004 (S.I. 2004 No. 2671)
- The Education (Inspectors of Schools in England) (No. 4) Order 2004 (S.I. 2004 No. 2672)
- The Cayman Islands (Constitution) (Amendment No. 2) Order 2004 (S.I. 2004 No. 2673)
- The Crime Prevention (Designated Areas) (Amendment) Order 2004 (S.I. 2004 No.2674)
- The A435 Trunk Road (Alcester to Gorcott Hill) De-Trunking Order 1993 (Revocation) Order 2004 (S.I. 2004 No. 2675)
- The Child Trust Funds (Amendment) Regulations 2004 (S.I. 2004 No. 2676)
- The District of Staffordshire Moorlands (Electoral Changes) (Amendment) Order 2004 (S.I. 2004 No. 2677)
- The Borough of West Devon (Electoral Changes) (Amendment) Order 2004 (S.I. 2004 No. 2678)
- The A435 Trunk Road (Studley Bypass and Slip Roads) Order 1993 (Revocation) Order 2004 (S.I. 2004 No. 2679)
- The Child Trust Funds (Insurance Companies) Regulations 2004 (S.I. 2004 No.2680)
- The Housing (Right to Buy) (Designated Rural Areas and Designated Regions) (England) (No.2) Order 2004 (S.I. 2004 No. 2681)
- The Public Service Vehicles (Traffic Regulation Conditions) (England and Wales) Regulations 2004 (S.I. 2004 No. 2682)
- The New Relationship with Schools (Governors' Annual Report) Order 2004 (S.I. 2004 No. 2683)
- The Road Traffic (Special Parking Area) (GLA Roads and GLA Side Roads) Order 2004 (S.I. 2004 No. 2684)
- The Albion Junior School (Change to School Session Times) Order 2004 (S.I. 2004 No. 2685)
- The Food Protection (Emergency Prohibitions) (Scallops) (Irish Sea) (Revocation) Order 2004 (S.I. 2004 No. 2686)
- The Feeding Stuffs, the Feeding Stuffs (Sampling and Analysis) and the Feeding Stuffs (Enforcement) (Amendment) (England) (No. 2) Regulations 2004 (S.I. 2004 No. 2688)
- The Common Agricultural Policy Single Payment and Support Schemes (Appeals) (England) Regulations 2004 (S.I. 2004 No. 2689)
- The International Criminal Tribunal for the Former Yugoslavia (Freezing of Funds and Economic Resources of Indictees) Regulations 2004 (S.I. 2004 No. 2690)
- The A4 London to Bristol Trunk Road (Colnbrook Bypass) (Detrunking) Order 2004 (S.I. 2004 No. 2691)
- The Genetically Modified Organisms (Transboundary Movements) (England) Regulations 2004 (S.I. 2004 No.2692)
- The Prescription Only Medicines (Human Use) Amendment (No. 3) Order 2004 (S.I. 2004 No. 2693)
- The National Health Service (Primary Medical Services) (Miscellaneous Amendments) Regulations 2004 (S.I. 2004 No. 2694)
- The Disqualification from Caring for Children (Wales) Regulations 2004 (S.I. 2004 No. 2695 (W.235))
- Rheoliadau Datgymhwyso rhag Gofalu am Blant (Cymru) 2004 (S.I. 2004 Rhif 2695 (Cy.235))
- The Solent European Marine Site (Prohibition of Method of Dredging) Order 2004 (S.I. 2004 No. 2696)
- The Polish Potatoes (Notification) (Wales) Order 2004 (S.I. 2004 No. 2697 (W.236 ))
- Gorchymyn Tatws o Wlad Pwyl (Hysbysu) (Cymru) 2004 (S.I. 2004 Rhif 2697 (Cy.236))
- The Farnsfield St Michael's Church of England Primary (Voluntary Aided) School (Designation as having a Religious Character) Order 2004 (S.I. 2004 No. 2698)

== 2701–2800 ==
- The Compulsory Purchase of Land (Written Representations Procedure) (National Assembly for Wales) Regulations 2004 (S.I. 2004 No. 2730 (W.237))
- Rheoliadau Prynu Tir yn Orfodol (Gweithdrefn Sylwadau Ysgrifenedig) (Cynulliad Cenedlaethol Cymru) 2004 (S.I. 2004 Rhif 2730 (Cy.237))
- The Food Safety (Act of Accession concerning the Czech Republic and other States) (Consequential Amendments) (Wales) Regulations 2004 (S.I. 2004 No. 2731 (W.238))
- Rheoliadau Diogelwch Bwyd (Deddf Ymaelodi ynghylch y Weriniaeth Tsiec a Gwladwriaethau Eraill) (Diwygiadau Canlyniadol) (Cymru) 2004 (S.I. 2004 Rhif 2731 (Cy.238))
- The Compulsory Purchase of Land (Prescribed Forms) (National Assembly for Wales) Regulations 2004 (S.I. 2004 No. 2732 (W.239))
- Rheoliadau Prynu Tir yn Orfodol (Ffurfiau Rhagnodedig) (Cynulliad Cenedlaethol Cymru) 2004 (S.I. 2004 Rhif 2732 (Cy.239))
- The Education (Health Standards) (Wales) Regulations 2004 (S.I. 2004 No. 2733 (W.240))
- Rheoliadau Addysg (Safonau Iechyd) (Cymru) 2004 (S.I. 2004 Rhif 2733 (Cy.240))
- The Feeding Stuffs (Sampling and Analysis) (Amendment) (Wales) Regulations 2004 (S.I. 2004 No. 2734 (W.241))
- Rheoliadau Bwydydd Anifeiliaid (Samplu a Dadansoddi) (Diwygio) (Cymru) 2004 (S.I. 2004 Rhif 2734 (Cy.241))
- The TSE (Wales) (Amendment) Regulations 2004 (S.I. 2004 No. 2735 (W.242))
- Rheoliadau TSE (Cymru) (Diwygio) 2004 (S.I. 2004 Rhif 2735 (Cy.242))
- The Town and Country Planning (Fees for Applications and Deemed Applications) (Amendment) (Wales) Regulations 2004 (S.I. 2004 No. 2736 (W.243))
- Rheoliadau Cynllunio Gwlad a Thref (Ffioedd am Geisiadau a Cheisiadau Tybiedig) (Diwygio) (Cymru) 2004 (S.I. 2004 Rhif 2736 (Cy.243))
- The Financial Services and Markets Act 2000 (Regulated Activities) (Amendment) (No.2) Order 2004 (S.I. 2004 No. 2737)
- The Financial Services and Markets Act 2000 (Stakeholder Products) Regulations 2004 (S.I. 2004 No. 2738)
- The Export Control (Libya Embargo) Order 2004 (S.I. 2004 No. 2741)
- The Free Zone (Port of Sheerness) Designation Order 2004 (S.I. 2004 No. 2742)
- The Government Stock (Consequential and Transitional Provision) (No.3) Order 2004 (S.I. 2004 No. 2744)
- The Neath Port Talbot and Powys (Cwmtwrch) Order 2004 (S.I. 2004 No. 2746 (W.244))
- Gorchymyn Castell-nedd Port Talbot a Phowys (Cwm-twrch) 2004 (S.I. 2004 Rhif 2746 (Cy.244))
- The Powys (Brecon and Llanfrynach Communities) Order 2004 (S.I. 2004 No. 2747 (W.245))
- Gorchymyn Powys (Cymunedau Aberhonddu a Llanfrynach) 2004 (S.I. 2004 Rhif 2747 (Cy.245))
- The Local Authorities (Functions and Responsibilities) (Amendment No. 3) (England) Regulations 2004 (S.I. 2004 No. 2748)
- The Medicines (Products for Animal Use—Fees) Regulations 2004 (S.I. 2004 No.2750)
- The Competition Act 1998 (Office of Fair Trading's Rules) Order 2004 (S.I. 2004 No. 2751)
- The Education (Student Loans) (Repayment) (Amendment) (No 2) Regulations 2004 (S.I. 2004 No. 2752)
- The Education (Listed Bodies) (England) Order 2004 (S.I. 2004 No.2753)
- The A66 Trunk Road (Temple Sowerby Bypass and Improvements at Winderwath) Order 2004 (S.I. 2004 No. 2754)
- The Legal Services Ombudsman (Extension of Remit) Regulations 2004 (S.I. 2004 No. 2757)
- The Legal Services Complaints Commissioner (Maximum Penalty) Order 2004 (S.I. 2004 No. 2758)
- The Railways and Transport Safety Act 2003 (Commencement No. 4) Order 2004 (S.I. 2004 No. 2759 (C. 115 )])
- The Medicines (Vaccination Against Foot-and-Mouth Disease) Order 2004 (S.I. 2004 No. 2779)
- The Veterinary Surgery (Vaccination Against Foot-And-Mouth Disease) Order 2004 (S.I. 2004 No. 2780)
- The Higher Education Act 2004 (Commencement No. 1 and Transitional Provisions) Order 2004 (S.I. 2004 No. 2781 (C.116 )])
- The Antarctic (Amendment) Regulations 2004 (S.I. 2004 No. 2782)
- The Education (National Curriculum) (Key Stage 1 Assessment Arrangements) (England) Order 2004 (S.I. 2004 No. 2783)

== 2801–2900 ==
- The New Relationship with Schools (Governors' Annual Report) (No 2) Order 2004 (S.I. 2004 No. 2810)
- The County of Derbyshire (Electoral Changes) Order 2004 (S.I. 2004 No. 2811)
- The County of Devon (Electoral Changes) Order 2004 (S.I. 2004 No. 2812)
- The County of Essex (Electoral Changes) Order 2004 (S.I. 2004 No. 2813)
- The County of Gloucestershire (Electoral Changes) Order 2004 (S.I. 2004 No. 2814)
- The County of Kent (Electoral Changes) Order 2004 (S.I. 2004 No. 2815)
- The County of Nottinghamshire (Electoral Changes) Order 2004 (S.I. 2004 No. 2816)
- The County of Shropshire (Electoral Changes) Order 2004 (S.I. 2004 No. 2817)
- The County of Staffordshire (Electoral Changes) Order 2004 (S.I. 2004 No. 2818)
- The County of Surrey (Electoral Changes) Order 2004 (S.I. 2004 No. 2819)
- The County of Warwickshire (Electoral Changes) Order 2004 (S.I. 2004 No.2820)
- The County of Wiltshire (Electoral Changes) Order 2004 (S.I. 2004 No.2821)
- The Employment Act 2002 (Commencement No. 8) Order 2004 (S.I. 2004 No. 2822 (C.117)])
- The Finance Act 2003, Section 212, (Commencement) Order 2004 (S.I. 2004 No. 2823 (C.118)])
- The Food Labelling (Amendment) (England) (No. 2) Regulations 2004 (S.I. 2004 No. 2824)
- The Social Security (Housing Costs Amendments) Regulations 2004 (S.I. 2004 No. 2825)
- The Gangmasters (Licensing) Act 2004 (Commencement No. 1) Order 2004 (S.I. 2004 No.2857 (C.119)])
- The Education (School Performance Targets) (England) Regulations 2004 (S.I. 2004 No. 2858)
- The Motor Cars (Driving Instruction) (Amendment) Regulations 2004 (S.I. 2004 No. 2871)
- The Immigration (Assisting Unlawful Immigration) (Section 25 List of Schengen Acquis States) Order 2004 (S.I. 2004 No.2877)
- The Local Authorities (Goods and Services) (Public Bodies) (Wales) Order 2004 (S.I. 2004 No. 2878 (W.248))
- Gorchymyn Awdurdodau Lleol (Nwyddau a Gwasanaethau) (Cyrff Cyhoeddus) (Cymru) 2004 (S.I. 2004 Rhif 2878 (Cy.248))
- The National Assistance (Assessment of Resources) (Amendment No. 2) (Wales) Regulations 2004 (S.I. 2004 No. 2879 (W.249))
- Rheoliadau Cymorth Gwladol (Asesu Adnoddau) (Diwygio Rhif 2) (Cymru) 2004 (S.I. 2004 Rhif 2879 (Cy.249))
- The Care Council for Wales (Specification of Social Care Workers) (Registration) Order 2004 (S.I. 2004 No. 2880 (W.250))
- Gorchymyn Cyngor Gofal Cymru (Pennu Gweithwyr Gofal Cymdeithasol) (Cofrestru) 2004 (S.I. 2004 Rhif 2880 (Cy.250))
- The Oil and Fibre Plant Seed (Wales) Regulations 2004 (S.I. 2004 No. 2881 (W.251))
- The Employers' Liability (Compulsory Insurance) (Amendment) Regulations 2004 (S.I. 2004 No.2882)
- The Merchant Shipping (Passenger Ships on Domestic Voyages) (Amendment) (No. 2) Regulations 2004 (S.I. 2004 No. 2883)
- The Merchant Shipping (Ro-Ro Passenger Ships) (Stability) Regulations 2004 (S.I. 2004 No. 2884)
- The Salmonella in Laying Flocks (Survey Powers) (England) Regulations 2004 (S.I. 2004 No. 2885)
- The Animals and Animal Products (Import and Export) (No. 2) Regulations 2004 (S.I. 2004 No. 2886)
- The Air Quality Limit Values (Amendment) (England) Regulations 2004 (S.I. 2004 No. 2888)
- The Fines (Deductions from Income Support)(Amendment) Regulations 2004 (S.I. 2004 No.2889)
- The A45 Trunk Road (M1 Junction 16 Roundabout) (Detrunking) Order 2004 (S.I. 2004 No. 2890)
- The Diseases of Animals (Approved Disinfectants) (Amendment) (England) Order 2004 (S.I. 2004 No. 2891)
- The Swinford Hospital (Designation as having a Religious Character) Order 2004 (S.I. 2004 No. 2892)
- The 5 Boroughs Partnership National Health Service Trust (Establishment) and the Warrington Community Health Care National Health Service Trust (Dissolution) Amendment Order 2004 (S.I. 2004 No. 2893)
- The Brighton Health Care National Health Service Trust (Establishment) Amendment Order 2004 (S.I. 2004 No. 2894)
- The Shrewsbury and Telford Hospital National Health Service Trust (Establishment) and the Princess Royal Hospital National Health Service Trust and the Royal Shrewsbury Hospitals National Health Service Trust (Dissolution) Amendment Order 2004 (S.I. 2004 No. 2895)
- The Warwickshire Ambulance Service National Health Service Trust (Establishment) Amendment Order 2004 (S.I. 2004 No.2896)
- The South Essex Mental Health and Community Care National Health Service Trust (Establishment) Amendment Order 2004 (S.I. 2004 No. 2897)
- The Mersey Regional Ambulance Service National Health Service Trust (Establishment) Amendment Order 2004 (S.I. 2004 No.2898)
- The Community Legal Service (Financial) (Amendment) Regulations 2004 (S.I. 2004 No. 2899)
- The Community Legal Service (Funding) (Amendment No.2) Order 2004 (S.I. 2004 No. 2900)

== 2901–3000 ==
- A63 Trunk Road (M1 Junction with A63 Selby Road to A1 Milford Lodge) (Detrunking) Order 2004 (S.I. 2004 No. 2901)
- The Controls on Certain Azo Dyes and Blue Colourant (Amendment) Regulations 2004 (S.I. 2004 No.2913)
- The National Curriculum (Key Stage 2 Assessment Arrangements) (Consequential Amendments) (Wales) Regulations 2004 (S.I. 2004 No. 2914 (W.253))
- Rheoliadau'r Cwricwlwm Cenedlaethol (Trefniadau Asesu Cyfnod Allweddol 2) (Diwygiadau Canlyniadol) (Cymru) 2004 (S.I. 2004 Rhif 2914 (Cy.253))
- The National Curriculum (Key Stage 2 Assessment Arrangements) (Wales) Order 2004 (S.I. 2004 No. 2915 (W.254))
- Gorchymyn y Cwricwlwm Cenedlaethol (Trefniadau Asesu Cyfnod Allweddol 2) (Cymru) 2004 (S.I. 2004 Rhif 2915 (Cy.254))
- The Water Act 2003 (Commencement No. 2) (Wales) Order 2004 (S.I. 2004 No. 2916 (W.255) (C.120))
- Gorchymyn Deddf Dŵr 2003 (Cychwyn Rhif 2) (Cymru) 2004 (S.I. 2004 Rhif 2916 (Cy.255) (C.120))
- The Fire and Rescue Services Act 2004 (Commencement) (Wales) Order 2004 (S.I. 2004 No. 2917 (W.256) (C.121))
- Gorchymyn Deddf y Gwasanaethau Tân ac Achub 2004 (Cychwyn) (Cymru) 2004 (S.I. 2004 Rhif 2917 (Cy.256) (C.121))
- The Fire and Rescue Services Act 2004 (Firefighters' Pension Scheme) (Wales) Order 2004 (S.I. 2004 No. 2918 (W.257))
- Gorchymyn Deddf y Gwasanaethau Tân ac Achub 2004 (Cynllun Pensiwn y Dynion Tân) (Cymru) 2004 (S.I. 2004 Rhif 2918 (Cy.257))
- The Single Payment Scheme and Miscellaneous Direct Support Schemes (Appeals) (Wales) Regulations 2004 (S.I. 2004 No. 2919 (W.258))
- Rheoliadau Cynllun y Taliad Sengl ac Amrywiol Gynlluniau Cymorth Uniongyrchol (Apelau) (Cymru) 2004 (S.I. 2004 Rhif 2919 (Cy.258))
- The Council Tax (Liability for Owners) (Amendment) (Wales) Regulations 2004 (S.I. 2004 No. 2920 (W.259))
- Rheoliadau'r Dreth Gyngor (Atebolrwydd Perchenogion) (Diwygio) (Cymru) 2004 (S.I. 2004 Rhif 2920 (Cy.259))
- The Council Tax (Chargeable Dwellings, Exempt Dwellings and Discount Disregards) (Amendment) (Wales) Order 2004 (S.I. 2004 No. 2921 (W.260))
- Gorchymyn y Dreth Gyngor (Anheddau Taladwy, Anheddau Esempt a Diystyru Gostyngiadau) (Diwygio) (Cymru) 2004 (S.I. 2004 Rhif 2921 (Cy.260))
- The Fixed Penalty Offences Order 2004 (S.I. 2004 No. 2922)
- The Service Charges (Consultation Requirements) (Amendment) (No. 2) (England) Regulations 2004 (S.I. 2004 No. 2939)
- The Companies Act 1985 (International Accounting Standards and Other Accounting Amendments) Regulations 2004 (S.I. 2004 No. 2947)
- The Occupational Pensions (Revaluation) Order 2004 (S.I. 2004 No.2948)
- The Seeds (National Lists of Varieties) (Amendment) Regulations 2004 (S.I. 2004 No. 2949)
- The Courts and Legal Services Act 1990 (Commencement No. 11) Order 2004 (S.I. 2004 No. 2950 (C.122 )])
- The Probate Services (Approved Body) Complaints Regulations 2004 (S.I. 2004 No. 2951)
- The Electricity (Applications for Licences, Modifications of an Area and Extensions and Restrictions of Licences) (No. 2) Regulations 2004 (S.I. 2004 No. 2952)
- The Scotland Act 1998 (Modification of Functions) Order 2004 (S.I. 2004 No. 2980 (S.9)])
- The Gas (Applications for Licences and Extensions and Restrictions of Licences) (No. 2) Regulations 2004 (S.I. 2004 No. 2983)
- The Housing Benefit (General) (Amendment) Regulations 2004 (S.I. 2004 No.2984)
- The Non-Contentious Probate (Amendment) Rules 2004 (S.I. 2004 No.2985 (L.17)])
- The Designation of Schools Having a Religious Character (Independent Schools) (England) (No.6) Order 2004 (S.I. 2004 No.2986)
- The Health and Social Care (Community Health and Standards) Act 2003 (Commission for Healthcare Audit and Inspection and Commission for Social Care Inspection) (Consequential Provisions) Order 2004 (S.I. 2004 No.2987)
- The Cosmetic Products (Safety) (Amendment) (No.2) Regulations 2004 (S.I. 2004 No. 2988)
- The Employment Rights (Increase of Limits) Order 2004 (S.I. 2004 No. 2989)
- The Food Safety Act 1990 (Amendment) Regulations 2004 (S.I. 2004 No. 2990)
- The Crown Court (Amendment No. 3) Rules 2004 (S.I. 2004 No. 2991 (L. 18)])
- The Criminal Appeal (Amendment No. 2) Rules 2004 (S.I. 2004 No. 2992 (L. 19 )])
- The Magistrates' Courts (Amendment) Rules 2004 (S.I. 2004 No. 2993 (L. 20)])
- The Individual Savings Account (Amendment No. 2) Regulations 2004 (S.I. 2004 No. 2996)
- The Immigration and Asylum Act 1999 (Commencement No. 16) Order 2004 (S.I. 2004 No. 2997 (C. 123)])
- The Nationality, Immigration and Asylum Act 2002 (Commencement No. 9) Order 2004 (S.I. 2004 No. 2998 (C. 124)])
- The Asylum and Immigration (Treatment of Claimants, etc.) Act 2004 (Commencement No. 2) Order 2004 (S.I. 2004 No. 2999 (C. 125 )])

== 3001–3100 ==
- The Northern Ireland (Sentences) Act 1998 (Specified Organisations) Order 2004 (S.I. 2004 No. 3009)
- The Food Labelling (Amendment) (No. 2) (Wales) Regulations 2004 (S.I. 2004 No. 3022 (W.261))
- Rheoliadau Labelu Bwyd (Diwygio) (Rhif 2) (Cymru) 2004 (S.I. 2004 Rhif 3022 (Cy.261))
- The Landfill (Maximum Landfill Amount)(Northern Ireland) Regulations 2004 (S.I. 2004 No. 3027)
- The Motor Vehicles (Driving Licences) (Amendment) (No.3) Regulations 2004 (S.I. 2004 No. 3028)
- The Occupational Pension Schemes (Minimum Funding Requirement and Actuarial Valuations) Amendment Regulations 2004 (S.I. 2004 No. 3031)
- The Criminal Justice Act 2003 (Commencement No. 6 and Transitional Provisions) Order 2004 (S.I. 2004 No. 3033 (C.126)])
- The European Communities (Designation) (No. 6) Order 2004 (S.I. 2004 No. 3037)
- The Primary Medical Services (Northern Ireland) Order 2004 (Consequential Amendments) Order 2004 (S.I. 2004 No. 3038)
- The International Criminal Tribunal for the former Yugoslavia (Restrictive Measures) (Overseas Territories) Order 2004 (S.I. 2004 No. 3039)
- The Child Abduction and Custody (Parties to Conventions) (Amendment) Order 2004 (S.I. 2004 No. 3040)
- Merchant Shipping (Oil Pollution and General Provisions) (Isle of Man) Order 2004 (S.I. 2004 No. 3041)
- The Merchant Shipping (Oil Pollution) (Gibraltar) Order 2004 (S.I. 2004 No. 3042)
- The European Convention on Cinematographic Co-production (Amendment) (No. 3) Order 2004 (S.I. 2004 No. 3043)
- The National Assembly for Wales (Transfer of Functions) Order 2004 (S.I. 2004 No. 3044)
- The Education (School Organisation Proposals) (Miscellaneous Amendments) (England) Regulations 2004 (S.I. 2004 No. 3052)
- The Scarweather Sands Offshore Wind Farm Order 2004 (S.I. 2004 No. 3054 (W.263))
- Gorchymyn Fferm Wynt ar y Môr Cefnenni Tywod Scarweather 2004 (S.I. 2004 Rhif 3054 (Cy.263))
- The Local Authorities (Capital Finance and Accounting) (Amendment) (England) (No. 2) Regulations 2004 (S.I. 2004 No. 3055)
- The Commonhold and Leasehold Reform Act 2002 (Commencement No.5 and Saving and Transitional Provision) Order 2004 (S.I. 2004 No. 3056 (C.127)])
- The Non-Domestic Rating (Alteration of Lists and Appeals) (Amendment) (England) Regulations 2004 (S.I. 2004 No. 3057)
- The M1 Motorway (Markham Road and Erin Road, Staveley, Derbyshire) Connecting Roads Scheme 2004 (S.I. 2004 No. 3058)
- The Contaminants in Food (England) Regulations 2004 (S.I. 2004 No. 3062)
- The Employment Relations (Northern Ireland) Order 2004 (S.I. 2004 No. 3078 (N.I. 19)])
- The Roads (Amendment) (Northern Ireland) Order 2004 (S.I. 2004 No. 3079 (N.I. 20)])
- The Financial Assistance for Young Farmers (Northern Ireland) Order 2004 (S.I. 2004 No. 3080 (N.I. 21)])
- The Medicines (Products for Animal Use—Fees) (Amendment) Regulations 2004 (S.I. 2004 No.3081)
- The Local Authorities (Indemnities for Members and Officers) Order 2004 (S.I. 2004 No. 3082)
- The Value Added Tax (Insurance) Order 2004 (S.I. 2004 No. 3083)
- The Value Added Tax (Cars) (Amendment) Order 2004 (S.I. 2004 No. 3084)
- The Value Added Tax (Special Provisions) (Amendment) (No.2) Order 2004 (S.I. 2004 No. 3085)
- The Rights of Re-entry and Forfeiture (Prescribed Sum and Period) (England) Regulations 2004 (S.I. 2004 No.3086)
- The Income Tax (Exemption of Minor Benefits) (Amendment) Regulations 2004 (S.I. 2004 No. 3087)
- The Countryside and Rights of Way Act 2000 (Commencement No. 6) Order 2004 (S.I. 2004 No. 3088 (C.128)])
- The Freedom of Information (Scotland) Act 2002 (Consequential Modifications) Order 2004 (S.I. 2004 No. 3089 (S.10)])
- The Feeding Stuffs, the Feeding Stuffs (Sampling and Analysis) and the Feeding Stuffs (Enforcement) (Amendment) (Wales) (No. 2) Regulations 2004 (S.I. 2004 No. 3091 (W.265))
- Rheoliadau Porthiant, Porthiant (Samplu a Dadansoddi) a Phorthiant (Gorfodi) (Diwygio) (Cymru) (Rhif 2) 2004 (S.I. 2004 Rhif 3091 (Cy.265))
- The Local Authorities (Alternative Arrangements) (Amendment) (Wales) Regulations 2004 (S.I. 2004 No. 3092 (W.266))
- Rheoliadau Awdurdodau Lleol (Trefniadau Amgen) (Diwygio) (Cymru) 2004 (S.I. 2004 Rhif 3092 (Cy.266))
- The Local Authorities Executive Arrangements (Functions and Responsibilities) (Amendment) (Wales) Regulations 2004 (S.I. 2004 No. 3093 (W.267))
- Rheoliadau Trefniadau Gweithrediaeth Awdurdodau Lleol (Swyddogaethau a Chyfrifoldebau) (Diwygio) (Cymru) 2004 (S.I. 2004 Rhif 3093 (Cy.267))
- The Local Authorities (Calculation of Council Tax Base) and Council Tax (Prescribed Classes of Dwellings) (Wales) (Amendment) Regulations 2004 (S.I. 2004 No. 3094 (W.268))
- Rheoliadau Awdurdodau Lleol (Cyfrifo Sylfaen Treth Gyngor) a'r Dreth Gyngor (Dosbarthau Rhagnodedig ar Anheddau) (Cymru) (Diwygio) 2004 (S.I. 2004 Rhif 3094 (Cy.268))
- The Education (Listed Bodies) (Wales) Order 2004 (S.I. 2004 No. 3095 (W.269))
- Gorchymyn Addysg (Cyrff sy'n Cael eu Rhestru) (Cymru) 2004 (S.I. 2004 Rhif 3095 (Cy.269))
- The Landlord and Tenant (Notice of Rent) (England) Regulations 2004 (S.I. 2004 No. 3096)
- The Leasehold Houses (Notice of Insurance Cover) (England) Regulations 2004 (S.I. 2004 No. 3097)
- The Leasehold Valuation Tribunals (Procedure) (Amendment) (England) Regulations 2004 (S.I. 2004 No. 3098)
- The International Criminal Tribunal for the Former Yugoslavia (Freezing of Funds and Economic Resources of Indictees) (Amendment) Regulations 2004 (S.I. 2004 No. 3099)
- The Burma (Prohibition on Financing) Regulations 2004 (S.I. 2004 No.3100)

== 3101–3200 ==
- The Export of Goods, Transfer of Technology and Provision of Technical Assistance (Control) (Overseas Territories) Order 2004 (S.I. 2004 No. 3101)
- The Trade in Goods (Control) (Overseas Territories) Order 2004 (S.I. 2004 No. 3102)
- The Trade in Controlled Goods (Embargoed Destinations) (Overseas Territories) Order 2004 (S.I. 2004 No. 3103)
- The Finance Act 2004, section 22(2), (Appointed Day) Order 2004 (S.I. 2004 No. 3104 (C. 129)])
- The Immigration (Leave to Remain) (Fees) (Amendment No. 2) Regulations 2004 (S.I. 2004 No.3105)
- The Borough of Basingstoke and Deane (Electoral Changes) (Amendment) Order 2004 (S.I. 2004 No. 3106)
- The Watford and South of St Albans – Redbourn – Kidney Wood, Luton (Special Road Scheme 1957) (Park Street to Beechtrees Partial Revocation) Scheme 2004 Revocation Scheme 2004 (S.I. 2004 No. 3107)
- The Tyne Metropolitan College (Incorporation) Order 2004 (S.I. 2004 No. 3108)
- The Tyne Metropolitan College (Government) Regulations 2004 (S.I. 2004 No. 3109)
- The Traffic Management Act 2004 (Commencement No.2) (England) Order 2004 (S.I. 2004 No.3110 (C.130)])
- The Plastic Materials and Articles in Contact with Food (Amendment) (England) Regulations 2004 (S.I. 2004 No. 3113)
- The Family Proceedings Fees Order 2004 (S.I. 2004 No. 3114 (L. 21)])
- The Non-Contentious Probate Fees Order 2004 (S.I. 2004 No. 3120 (L. 22)])
- The Civil Proceedings Fees Order 2004 (S.I. 2004 No. 3121 (L. 23)])
- The Freedom of Information Act 2000 (Commencement No. 5) Order 2004 (S.I. 2004 No. 3122 (C. 131)])
- The Courts Act 2003 (Commencement No. 8, Savings and Consequential Provisions) Order 2004 (S.I. 2004 No. 3123 (C. 132)])
- The Stamp Duty Land Tax (Administration) (Amendment) Regulations 2004 (S.I. 2004 No. 3124)
- The Race Relations Act 1976 (Statutory Duties) Order 2004 (S.I. 2004 No.3125)
- Preston Dock Railway Order 2004 (S.I. 2004 No 3126)
- The Race Relations Act 1976 (General Statutory Duty) Order 2004 (S.I. 2004 No. 3127)
- Public Lending Right Scheme 1982 (Commencement of Variation) (No. 2) Order 2004 (S.I. 2004 No. 3128)
- The Civil Procedure (Amendment No. 3) Rules 2004 (S.I. 2004 No. 3129 (L. 24 )])
- The Financing of Maintained Schools (England) Regulations 2004 (S.I. 2004 No. 3130)
- The LEA Budget, Schools Budget and Individual Schools Budget (England) Regulations 2004 (S.I. 2004 No. 3131)
- The Local Government Act 2003 (Commencement No. 2 and Savings) Order 2004 (S.I. 2004 No. 3132 (C.133)])
- The A50 Trunk Road (Queensway Roundabout to Heron Cross Roundabout) Order 2004 (S.I. 2004 No. 3133)
- The Child Minding and Day Care (Disclosure Functions) (England) Regulations 2004 (S.I. 2004 No. 3136)
- The National Assembly for Wales (Transfer of Records) Order 2004 (S.I. 2004 No. 3137)
- The Tobacco Advertising and Promotion Act 2002 (Commencement No.7) Order 2004 (S.I. 2004 No. 3138 (C.134)])
- The Rail Vehicle Accessibility (South West Trains Class 444 and Class 450 Vehicles) Exemption (Amendment) Order 2004 (S.I. 2004 No. 3139)
- The Value Added Tax (Amendment) (No. 4) Regulations 2004 (S.I. 2004 No. 3140)
- The Private Security Industry Act 2001 (Commencement No. 6) Order 2004 (S.I. 2004 No. 3141 (C.135 )])
- The Council Tax (Transitional Arrangements) (Wales) Regulations 2004 (S.I. 2004 No. 3142 (W.270))
- Rheoliadau'r Dreth Gyngor (Trefniadau Trosiannol) (Cymru) 2004 (S.I. 2004 Rhif 3142 (Cy.270))
- The Council Tax (Demand Notices) (Transitional Arrangements) (Wales) Regulations 2004 (S.I. 2004 No. 3143 (W.271))
- Rheoliadau'r Dreth Gyngor (Hysbysiadau Galw am Dalu) (Trefniadau Trosiannol) (Cymru) 2004 (S.I. 2004 Rhif 3143 (Cy.271))
- The Higher Education Act 2004 (Commencement No.1 and Transitional Provision) (Wales) Order 2004 (S.I. 2004 No. 3144 (W.272) (C.136))
- Gorchymyn Deddf Addysg Uwch 2004 (Cychwyn Rhif 1 a Darpariaeth Drosiannol) (Cymru) 2004 (S.I. 2004 Rhif 3144 (Cy.272) (C.136))
- The Private Security Industry Act 2001 (Repeal and Revocation) Order 2004 (S.I. 2004 No. 3145)
- The Non-Domestic Rating (Unoccupied Property) (England) (Amendment) Regulations 2004 (S.I. 2004 No.3146)
- The Value Added Tax (Imported Gas and Electricity) Relief Order 2004 (S.I. 2004 No. 3147)
- The Value Added Tax (Place of Supply of Goods) Order 2004 (S.I. 2004 No.3148)
- The Value Added Tax (Reverse Charge) (Gas and Electricity) Order 2004 (S.I. 2004 No.3149)
- The Value Added Tax (Removal of Gas and Electricity) Order 2004 (S.I. 2004 No. 3150)
- The Non-Domestic Rating (Stud Farms) (England) Order 2004 (S.I. 2004 No. 3151)
- The Non-Domestic Rating (Former Agricultural Premises) (England) Order 2004 (S.I. 2004 No. 3152)
- The Non-Domestic Rating (Rural Settlements) (England) (Amendment) Order 2004 (S.I. 2004 No. 3153)
- The Wireless Telegraphy (Spectrum Trading) Regulations 2004 (S.I. 2004 No. 3154)
- The Wireless Telegraphy (Register) Regulations 2004 (S.I. 2004 No.3155)
- The Town and Country Planning (Electronic Communications) (Wales) (No. 1) Order 2004 (S.I. 2004 No. 3156 (W.273))
- The Town and Country Planning (Electronic Communications) (Wales) (No. 2) Order 2004 (S.I. 2004 No. 3157 (W.274))
- Gorchymyn Cynllunio Gwlad a Thref (Cyfathrebu Electronig) (Cymru) (Rhif 2) 2004 (S.I. 2004 Rhif 3157 (Cy.274))
- The Local Authorities (Changing Executive Arrangements and Alternative Arrangements) (Wales) Regulations 2004 (S.I. 2004 No. 3158 (W.275))
- Rheoliadau Awdurdodau Lleol (Newid Trefniadau Gweithrediaeth a Threfniadau Amgen) (Cymru) 2004 (S.I. 2004 Rhif 3158 (Cy.275))
- The Motor Cars (Driving Instruction) (Amendment) (No.2) Regulations 2004 (S.I. 2004 No. 3159)
- The Excise Duties (Surcharges or Rebates) (Hydrocarbon Oils etc.) (Amendment) Order 2004 (S.I. 2004 No. 3160)
- The Income Tax (Indexation) (No.2) Order 2004 (S.I. 2004 No. 3161)
- The Excise Duties (Surcharges or Rebates) (Bioethanol) Order 2004 (S.I. 2004 No. 3162)
- The Anglian Regional Flood Defence Committee (Abolition) Order 2004 (S.I. 2004 No.3163)
- The Wessex Regional Flood Defence Committee Order 2004 (S.I. 2004 No.3164)
- The Southern Regional Flood Defence Committee Order 2004 (S.I. 2004 No.3165)
- The Penalties for Disorderly Behaviour (Amendment of Minimum Age) Order 2004 (S.I. 2004 No.3166)
- The Penalties for Disorderly Behaviour (Amount of Penalty) (Amendment No. 3) Order 2004 (S.I. 2004 No. 3167)
- The Fire and Rescue Services Act 2004 (Consequential Amendments) (England) Order 2004 (S.I. 2004 No.3168)
- The Penalties for Disorderly Behaviour (Form of Penalty Notice) (Amendment) Regulations 2004 (S.I. 2004 No. 3169)
- The International Fund for Agricultural Development (Sixth Replenishment) Order 2004 (S.I. 2004 No. 3170)
- The Immigration (Exemption from Control) (Amendment) Order 2004 (S.I. 2004 No. 3171)
- The Town and Country Planning (Electronic Communications) (Wales) (No. 3) Order 2004 (S.I. 2004 No. 3172)
- The A590 Trunk Road (High and Low Newton Bypass and Slip Roads) Order 2004 (S.I. 2004 No. 3173)
- The A590 Trunk Road (Whitestone to Cartmel Lane) (Detrunking) Order 2004 (S.I. 2004 No. 3174)
- The Waste and Emissions Trading Act 2003 (Commencement No.1) (England) Order 2004 (S.I. 2004 No.3181 (C.137)])
- The Waste and Emissions Trading Act 2003 (Commencement No.3) Order 2004 (S.I. 2004 No.3192 (C.138)])
- The Marketing Authorisations for Veterinary Medicinal Products (Revocation of Confidentiality Provision) Regulations 2004 (S.I. 2004 No. 3193)
- The Common Agricultural Policy Single Payment and Support Schemes (Cross Compliance) (England) Regulations 2004 (S.I. 2004 No. 3196)
- The Medicines (Pharmacies) (Applications for Registration and Fees) Amendment Regulations 2004 (S.I. 2004 No. 3197)
- The Rail Vehicle Accessibility (South Central Class 377/4) Exemption Order 2004 (S.I. 2004 No. 3198)
- The Building Societies (Accounts and Related Provisions) (Amendment) Regulations 2004 (S.I. 2004 No. 3199)
- The Building Societies Act 1986 (Modification of the Lending Limit and Funding Limit Calculations) Order 2004 (S.I. 2004 No. 3200)

== 3201–3300 ==
- The Recreational Craft (Amendment) Regulations 2004 (S.I. 2004 No. 3201)
- The Water Mergers (Modification of Enactments) Regulations 2004 (S.I. 2004 No. 3202)
- The Adoption and Children Act 2002 (Commencement No. 7) Order 2004 (S.I. 2004 No. 3203 (C.139)])
- The Enterprise Act 2002 (Merger Fees and Determination of Turnover) (Amendment) Order 2004 (S.I. 2004 No. 3204)
- The Patents Act 2004 (Commencement No. 2 and Consequential, etc. and Transitional Provisions) Order 2004 (S.I. 2004 No. 3205 (C. 140)])
- The Water Mergers (Determination of Turnover) Regulations 2004 (S.I. 2004 No. 3206)
- The Mutual Assistance Provisions Order 2004 (S.I. 2004 No. 3207)
- The Stamp Duty Land Tax (Land Transaction Returns) Regulations 2004 (S.I. 2004 No. 3208)
- The A 52 Trunk Road (Dunkirk Roundabout) (Detrunking) Order 2004 (S.I. 2004 No. 3209)
- The Building (Amendment) (No.3) Regulations 2004 (S.I. 2004 No. 3210)
- The Local Authorities (Categorisation) (England) (No. 2) Order 2004 (S.I. 2004 No. 3211)
- The Landfill Allowances and Trading Scheme (England) Regulations 2004 (S.I. 2004 No. 3212)
- The Plant Health (Forestry) (Phytophthora ramorum) (Great Britain) Order 2004 (S.I. 2004 No. 3213)
- The Air Navigation (Dangerous Goods)(Amendment) Regulations 2004 (S.I. 2004 No. 3214)
- The National Health Service (General Medical Services Contracts) (Prescription of Drugs etc.) (Amendment) Regulations 2004 (S.I. 2004 No. 3215)
- The Police (Amendment) Regulations 2004 (S.I. 2004 No. 3216)
- The Fire and Rescue Services (National Framework) (England) Order 2004 (S.I. 2004 No. 3217)
- The Stamp Duty and Stamp Duty Reserve Tax (Investment Exchanges and Clearing Houses) Regulations 2004 (S.I. 2004 No. 3218)
- The Insurance Accounts Directive (Lloyd's Syndicate and Aggregate Accounts) Regulations 2004 (S.I. 2004 No. 3219)
- The Genetically Modified Food (Wales) Regulations 2004 (S.I. 2004 No. 3220 (W.276))
- Rheoliadau Bwyd an Addaswyd yn Enetig (Cymru) 2004 (S.I. 2004 Rhif 3220 (Cy.276))
- The Genetically Modified Animal Feed (Wales) Regulations 2004 (S.I. 2004 No. 3221 (W. 277))
- Rheoliadau Bwyd Anifeiliaid an Addaswyd yn Enetig (Cymru) 2004 (S.I. 2004 Rhif 3221 (Cy.277))
- The Goods Vehicle Operators (Qualifications) (Amendment) Regulations 2004 (S.I. 2004 No. 3222)
- The Public Service Vehicle Operators (Qualifications) (Amendment) Regulations 2004 (S.I. 2004 No. 3223)
- The Medicines (Marketing Authorisations and Miscellaneous Amendments) Regulations 2004 (S.I. 2004 No. 3224)
- The Electricity (Exemption from the Requirement for a Generation Licence) (Scotland) Order 2004 (S.I. 2004 No. 3225 (S.11)])
- The Sea Fishing (Enforcement of Community Satellite Monitoring Measures) Order 2004 (S.I. 2004 No. 3226)
- The Sea Fishing (Enforcement of Community Satellite Monitoring Measures) Amendment (Revocation) (England) Regulations 2004 (S.I. 2004 No. 3227)
- The Private Security Industry Act 2001 (Commencement No. 7) Order 2004 (S.I. 2004 No. 3230 (C. 141 )])
- The Artificial Insemination of Cattle (Animal Health) (England and Wales) (Amendment) (England) Regulations 2004 (S.I. 2004 No. 3231)
- The Non-Domestic Rating Contributions (Wales) (Amendment) Regulations 2004 (S.I. 2004 No. 3232 (W.280))
- Rheoliadau Cyfraniadau Ardrethu Annomestig (Cymru) (Diwygio) 2004 (S.I. 2004 Rhif 3232 (Cy.280))
- The Enterprise Act 2002 (Commencement No. 7 and Transitional Provisions and Savings) Order 2004 (S.I. 2004 No. 3233 (C.142)])
- The Non-Domestic Rating Contributions (England) (Amendment) Regulations 2004 (S.I. 2004 No. 3234)
- The Christmas Day (Trading) Act 2004 (Commencement) Order 2004 (S.I. 2004 No. 3235 (C.143)])
- The Consumer Credit Act 1974 (Electronic Communications) Order 2004 (S.I. 2004 No. 3236)
- The Consumer Credit (Enforcement, Default and Termination Notices) (Amendment) Regulations 2004 (S.I. 2004 No. 3237)
- The Anti-social Behaviour Act 2003 (Commencement No. 3) (Wales) Order 2004 (S.I. 2004 No. 3238 (W.281) (C.144))
- Gorchymyn Deddf Ymddygiad Gwrthgymdeithasol 2003 (Cychwyn Rhif 3) (Cymru) 2004 (S.I. 2004 Rhif 3238 (Cy.281) (C.144))
- The International Criminal Court Act 2001 (Elements of Crimes) (No. 2) Regulations 2004 (S.I. 2004 No. 3239)
- The High Hedges (Appeals) (Wales) Regulations 2004 (S.I. 2004 No. 3240 (W.282))
- Rheoliadau Gwrychoedd neu Berthi Uchel (Apelau) (Cymru) 2004 (S.I. 2004 Rhif 3240 (CY.282))
- The High Hedges (Fees) (Wales) Regulations 2004 (S.I. 2004 No. 3241 (W.283))
- Rheoliadau Gwrychoedd neu Berthi Uchel (Ffioedd) (Cymru) 2004 (S.I. 2004 Rhif 3241 (Cy.283))
- The Joint Municipal Waste Management Strategies (Disapplication of Duties) (England) Regulations 2004 (S.I. 2004 No. 3242)
- Protection of Wrecks (Designation) (England) (No.3) Order 2004 (S.I. 2004 No. 3243)
- The Freedom of Information and Data Protection (Appropriate Limit and Fees) Regulations 2004 (S.I. 2004 No. 3244)
- The County of Bedfordshire (Electoral Changes) Order 2004 (S.I. 2004 No. 3245)
- The Road Traffic (Permitted Parking Area and Special Parking Area) (County of Hertfordshire) (District of North Hertfordshire) Order 2004 (S.I. 2004 No. 3246)
- The County of East Sussex (Electoral Changes) Order 2004 (S.I. 2004 No. 3247)
- The County of Hampshire (Electoral Changes) Order 2004 (S.I. 2004 No. 3248)
- Protection of Wrecks (Designation) (England) (No.2) Order 2004 (S.I. 2004 No. 3249)
- The County of Dorset (Electoral Changes) Order 2004 (S.I. 2004 No. 3250)
- The County of Oxfordshire (Electoral Changes) Order 2004 (S.I. 2004 No. 3251)
- The County of Suffolk (Electoral Changes) Order 2004 (S.I. 2004 No. 3252)
- The District of Chiltern (Electoral Changes) (Amendment) Order 2004 (S.I. 2004 No. 3253)
- The Feeding Stuffs (Safety Requirements for Feed for Food–Producing Animals) Regulations 2004 (S.I. 2004 No. 3254)
- The Higher Education Act 2004 (Commencement No. 2) Order 2004 (S.I. 2004 No. 3255 (C.145)])
- The Loan Relationships and Derivative Contracts (Disregard and Bringing into Account of Profits and Losses) Regulations 2004 (S.I. 2004 No. 3256)
- The Co-operatives and Community Benefit Societies Act 2003 (Commencement No. 2) Order 2004 (S.I. 2004 No. 3257 (C. 146)])
- The Motorways Traffic (England and Wales) (Amendment) Regulations 2004 (S.I. 2004 No. 3258)
- The Exchange Gains and Losses (Bringing into Account Gains or Losses) (Amendment) Regulations 2004 (S.I. 2004 No. 3259)
- The Insurance Companies (Reserves) (Tax) (Amendment) Regulations 2004 (S.I. 2004 No. 3260)
- The Motorways Traffic (Scotland) (Amendment) (No.2) Regulations 2004 (S.I. 2004 No. 3261 (S.12)])
- The Fireworks (Amendment) Regulations 2004 (S.I. 2004 No. 3262)
- The Immigration (Claimant's Credibility) Regulations 2004 (S.I. 2004 No. 3263)
- The Education (Company Directors Disqualification Act 1986: Amendments to Disqualification Provisions) (England) Regulations 2004 (S.I. 2004 No. 3264)
- The Public Interest Disclosure (Prescribed Persons) (Amendment) Order 2004 (S.I. 2004 No. 3265)
- The Insurance Companies (Corporation Tax Acts) Order 2004 (S.I. 2004 No. 3266)
- The Finance Act 2000, Schedule 20 (Definition of Small or Medium-Sized Enterprise) Order 2004 (S.I. 2004 No. 3267)
- The Finance Act 2004, Section 53 (Commencement) Order 2004 (S.I. 2004 No. 3268 (C. 147 )])
- The Finance Act 2004, Sections 38 to 45 and Schedule 6 (Consequential Amendment of Enactments No. 2) Order 2004 (S.I. 2004 No. 3269)
- The Finance Act 2002, Schedule 26, Parts 2 and 9 (Amendment No. 2) Order 2004 (S.I. 2004 No. 3270)
- The Loan Relationships and Derivative Contracts (Change Of Accounting Practice) Regulations 2004 (S.I. 2004 No. 3271)
- The Overseas Insurers (Tax Representatives) (Amendment) Regulations 2004 (S.I. 2004 No. 3272)
- The Insurance Companies (Overseas Life Assurance Business) (Compliance) (Amendment) Regulations 2004 (S.I. 2004 No. 3273)
- The Insurance Companies (Overseas Life Assurance Business) (Excluded Business) (Amendment) Regulations 2004 (S.I. 2004 No. 3274)
- The Overseas Life Assurance Fund (Amendment) Order 2004 (S.I. 2004 No. 3275)
- The Pollution Prevention and Control (England and Wales) (Amendment) and Connected Provisions Regulations 2004 (S.I. 2004 No. 3276)
- The OGCbuying.solutions Trading Fund (Appropriation of Additional Assets and Liabilities) Order 2004 (S.I. 2004 No. 3277)
- The Controls On Pentabromodiphenyl Ether And Octabromodiphenyl Ether (No. 2) Regulations 2004 (S.I. 2004 No. 3278)
- The General Food Regulations 2004 (S.I. 2004 No. 3279)
- The Common Agricultural Policy Single Payment and Support Schemes (Cross Compliance) (Wales) Regulations 2004 (S.I. 2004 No. 3280 (W.284))
- The Civil Contingencies Act 2004 (Commencement No.1) Order 2004 (S.I. 2004 No. 3281 (C. 148)])
- The Suspension of Day Care Providers and Child Minders (Wales) Regulations 2004 (S.I. 2004 No. 3282 (W.285))
- Rheoliadau Atal Dros Dro Ddarparwyr Gofal Dydd a Gwarchodwyr Plant (Cymru) 2004 (S.I. 2004 Rhif 3282 (Cy.285))
- The Horserace Betting and Olympic Lottery Act 2004 (Commencement No. 1) Order 2004 (S.I. 2004 No. 3283 (C. 149)])
- The Statistics of Trade (Customs and Excise) (Amendment) Regulations 2004 (S.I. 2004 No. 3284)
- The Road Vehicles (Registration and Licensing) (Amendment) (No. 5) Regulations 2004 (S.I. 2004 No. 3298)

== 3301–3400 ==
- The Access to the Countryside (Means of Access, Appeals) (England) Regulations 2004 (S.I. 2004 No. 3305)
- The Communications Act 2003 (Commencement No.3) Order 2004 (S.I. 2004 No. 3309 (C. 150)])
- The Road Traffic (Permitted Parking Area and Special Parking Area) (County of Hertfordshire) (District of East Hertfordshire) Order 2004 (S.I. 2004 No. 3310)
- The Non-Domestic Rating (Small Business Rate Relief) (England) Order 2004 (S.I. 2004 No. 3315)
- The Immigration (Designation of Travel Bans) (Amendment) Order 2004 (S.I. 2004 No. 3316)
- The Veterinary Surgeons and Veterinary Practitioners (Registration) (Amendment) Regulations Order of Council 2004 (S.I. 2004 No. 3317)
- The Health Professions Council (Election Scheme) Rules Order of Council 2004 (S.I. 2004 No. 3318)
- The Waste and Emissions Trading Act 2003 (Commencement No. 1) (England and Wales) Order 2004 (S.I. 2004 No. 3319 (C. 151)])
- The Waste and Emissions Trading Act 2003 (Commencement No. 1) (Great Britain) Order 2004 (S.I. 2004 No. 3320 (C.152)])
- The Waste and Emissions Trading Act 2003 (Commencement No. 2) (England) Order 2004 (S.I. 2004 No. 3321 (C.153)])
- The Companies (Audit, Investigations and Community Enterprise) Act 2004 (Commencement) and Companies Act 1989 (Commencement No 18) Order 2004 (S.I. 2004 No. 3322(C.154)])
- The Education (School Performance Targets) (England) (Amendment) Regulations 2004 (S.I. 2004 No. 3323)
- The Scotland Act 1998 (Functions Exercisable in or as Regards Scotland) Order 2004 (S.I. 2004 No. 3324 (S.13)])
- The Double Taxation Relief (Taxes on Income) (Georgia) Order 2004 (S.I. 2004 No. 3325)
- The Financial Provisions (Northern Ireland) Order 2004 (S.I. 2004 No. 3326 (N.I. 22)])
- The Agriculture (Northern Ireland) Order 2004 (S.I. 2004 No. 3327 (N.I. 23)])
- The European Communities (Designation) (No.7) Order 2004 (S.I. 2004 No. 3328)
- The Scotland Act 1998 (Modifications of Schedule 5) Order 2004 (S.I. 2004 No. 3329 (S.14)])
- The European Communities (Immunities and Privileges of the European Police Office) (Amendment) Order 2004 (S.I. 2004 No. 3330)
- The European Communities (Definition of Treaties) (European Police Office) Order 2004 (S.I. 2004 No. 3331)
- The Agency for International Trade Information and Co-operation (Legal Capacities) Order 2004 (S.I. 2004 No. 3332)
- The Burma (Restrictive Measures) (Overseas Territories) (Amendment) Order 2004 (S.I. 2004 No. 3333)
- The European Police College (Immunities and Privileges) Order 2004 (S.I. 2004 No. 3334)
- The Patents (Convention Countries) Order 2004 (S.I. 2004 No. 3335)
- The Designs (Convention Countries) Order 2004 (S.I. 2004 No. 3336)
- The Air Navigation (Overseas Territories) (Environmental Standards) Order 2004 (S.I. 2004 No. 3337)
- The Police Reform Act 2002 (Commencement No. 10) Order 2004 (S.I. 2004 No. 3338 ( C.155 )])
- The Proceeds of Crime Act 2002 (References to Financial Investigators) (Amendment No. 2) Order 2004 (S.I. 2004 No. 3339)
- The Town and Country Planning (General Development Procedure) (Amendment) (England) Order 2004 (S.I. 2004 No. 3340)
- The Planning (Listed Buildings and Conservation Areas) (Amendment) (No. 2) (England) Regulations 2004 (S.I. 2004 No. 3341)
- The Employment Relations Act 2004 (Commencement No.2 and Transitional Provisions) Order 2004 (S.I. 2004 No. 3342 (C.156 )])
- The Value Added Tax (Food) Order 2004 (S.I. 2004 No. 3343)
- The Food with Added Phytosterols or Phytostanols (Labelling) (England) Regulations 2004 (S.I. 2004 No. 3344)
- The Criminal Defence Service (Choice in Very High Cost Cases) (Amendment No.2) Regulations 2004 (S.I. 2004 No. 3345)
- The Criminal Justice Act 2003 (Categories of Offences) Order 2004 (S.I. 2004 No. 3346)
- The Loan Relationships and Derivative Contracts (Change Of Accounting Practice) (Amendment) Regulations 2004 (S.I. 2004 No. 3347)
- The Sweeteners in Food (Amendment) (England) Regulations 2004 (S.I. 2004 No. 3348)
- The Biofuel (Labelling) Regulations 2004 (S.I. 2004 No. 3349)
- The Pensions Act 2004 (Commencement No. 1 and Consequential and Transitional Provisions) Order 2004 (S.I. 2004 No. 3350 (C.157)])
- The Financial Services and Markets Act 2000 (Transitional Provisions) (General Insurance Intermediaries) Order 2004 (S.I. 2004 No. 3351)
- The Financial Services and Markets Act 2000 (Designated Professional Bodies) (Amendment) Order 2004 (S.I. 2004 No. 3352)
- The Faith Primary School (Designation as having a Religious Character) Order 2004 (S.I. 2004 No. 3353)
- The Protection of Children and Vulnerable Adults and Care Standards Tribunal (Amendment No.2) Regulations 2004 (S.I. 2004 No. 3354)
- The Freedom of Information (Removal and Relaxation of Statutory Prohibitions on Disclosure of Information) Order 2004 (S.I. 2004 No. 3363)
- The Freedom of Information (Time for Compliance with Request) Regulations 2004 (S.I. 2004 No. 3364)
- The National Health Service (Appointment of Consultants) Amendment Regulations 2004 (S.I. 2004 No. 3365)
- The Enterprise Act 2002 (Bodies Designated to make Super-complaints) (Amendment) Order 2004 (S.I. 2004 No. 3366)
- The Plant Health (Phytophthora kernovii Management Zone) (England) Order 2004 (S.I. 2004 No. 3367)
- The Social Security, Child Support and Tax Credits (Decisions and Appeals) Amendment Regulations 2004 (S.I. 2004 No. 3368)
- The Child Trust Funds Act 2004 (Commencement No. 2) Order 2004 (S.I. 2004 No. 3369 (C. 158)])
- The West Northamptonshire Development Corporation (Area and Constitution) Order 2004 (S.I. 2004 No. 3370)
- The Penalties for Disorderly Behaviour (Amount of Penalty) (Amendment No. 4) Order 2004 (S.I. 2004 No. 3371)
- The Local Government Pension Scheme (Amendment) (No. 2) Regulations 2004 (S.I. 2004 No. 3372)
- The Education (Provision of Information by Independent Schools) (England) (Amendment) Regulations 2004 (S.I. 2004 No. 3373)
- The Education (Independent School Standards) (England) (Amendment) Regulations 2004 (S.I. 2004 No. 3374)
- The Family Proceedings (Amendment) Rules 2004 (S.I. 2004 No. 3375 (L. 25)])
- The Family Proceedings Courts (Children Act 1989) (Amendment) Rules 2004 (S.I. 2004 No. 3376 (L. 26)])
- The Child Benefit and Guardian's Allowance (Decisions and Appeals) (Amendment) Regulations 2004 (S.I. 2004 No. 3377)
- The Electronic Commerce Directive (Financial Services and Markets) (Amendment) Regulations 2004 (S.I. 2004 No. 3378)
- The Life Assurance Consolidation Directive (Consequential Amendments) Regulations 2004 (S.I. 2004 No. 3379)
- The Building Societies Act 1986 (International Accounting Standards and Other Accounting Amendments) Order 2004 (S.I. 2004 No. 3380)
- The A5036 Trunk Road (M57 Switch Island Junction Improvements) Order 2004 (S.I. 2004 No. 3381)
- The Child Trust Funds (Amendment No. 2) Regulations 2004 (S.I. 2004 No. 3382)
- The Common Agricultural Policy Single Payment Scheme (Set-aside) (England) Regulations 2004 (S.I. 2004 No. 3385)
- The Control of Substances Hazardous to Health (Amendment) Regulations 2004 (S.I. 2004 No. 3386)
- The Non-Domestic Rating (Chargeable Amounts) (England) Regulations 2004 (S.I. 2004 No. 3387)
- The Products of Animal Origin (Third Country Imports) (England) (No. 4) Regulations 2004 (S.I. 2004 No. 3388)
- The Council Tax and Non-Domestic Rating (Demand Notices) (England) (Amendment) Regulations 2004 (S.I. 2004 No. 3389)
- The Greenhouse Gas Emissions Trading Scheme (Amendment) Regulations 2004 (S.I. 2004 No. 3390)
- Environmental Information Regulations 2004 (S.I. 2004 No. 3391)
- The Electricity and Gas (Energy Efficiency Obligations) Order 2004 (S.I. 2004 No. 3392)
- The South-west Territorial Waters (Prohibition of Pair Trawling) Order 2004 (S.I. 2004 No. 3397)
- The Asylum and Immigration (Treatment of Claimants, etc.) Act 2004 (Commencement No. 3) Order 2004 (S.I. 2004 No. 3398 (C.159)])
- The Falmouth Harbour Revision (Constitution) Order 2004 (S.I. 2004 No. 3400)

== 3401–3500 ==
- General Medical Council (Registration (Fees) (Amendment) Regulations) Order of Council 2004 (S.I. 2004 No. 3409)
- Postgraduate Medical Education and Training Board (Members – Removal from Office) Rules Order 2004 (S.I. 2004 No. 3410)
- Severn Bridges Tolls Order 2004 (S.I. 2004 No. 3414)
- High Court (Distribution of Business) Order 2004 (S.I. 2004 No. 3418 (L. 27 )])
- Civil Procedure (Amendment No. 4) Rules 2004 (S.I. 2004 No. 3419(L. 28 )])
- Abolition of the Houghton and Wyton Internal Drainage District Order 2004 (S.I. 2004 No. 3423)
- Information and Consultation of Employees Regulations 2004 (S.I. 2004 No. 3426)
- M62 Motorway (Junction 21 Improvements) (Slip Roads) (Detrunking) Order 2004 (S.I. 2004 No. 3431)
- M62 Motorway (Junction 21 Improvements and Connecting Road) Scheme 2004 (S.I. 2004 No. 3432)
- North of Worsley—West of Moss Moor Motorway Connecting Roads (No. 3) Special Roads Scheme 1966 (Variation) Scheme 2004 (S.I. 2004 No. 3433)
- A1033 Trunk Road (Hedon Road) (Trunking and Detrunking) Order 2004 (S.I. 2004 No. 3434)
- A63 Trunk Road (Barlby Junction to Bridge Farm) (Detrunking) Order 2004 (S.I. 2004 No. 3435)
- A63 Trunk Road (Osgodby Bypass) Order 2004 (S.I. 2004 No. 3436)
- Contracts (Applicable Law) Act 1990 (Commencement No. 2) Order 2004 (S.I. 2004 No. 3448 (C.160)])
- General Optical Council (Registration and Enrolment) (Amendment No. 2) Rules Order of Council 2004 (S.I. 2004 No. 3459)

== See also ==
- List of statutory instruments of the United Kingdom
