= Information and Consultation of Employees Regulations 2004 =

United Kingdom statutory instrument

Information and Consultation of Employees Regulations 2004 (Note: Section 1(1).)
- Statutory Instrument
- Parliament of the United Kingdom
- Citation: SI 2004/3426
- Territorial extent: England and Wales; Scotland; (Note: Section 1(2).)

Dates
- Made: 21 December 2004
- Commencement: 6 April 2005

Other legislation
- Amends: Employment Tribunals Act 1996
- Made under: Employment Relations Act 2004

Status: Amended

Text of statute as originally enacted

Revised text of statute as amended

Text of the Information and Consultation of Employees Regulations 2004 as in force today (including any amendments) within the United Kingdom, from legislation.gov.uk.

The Information and Consultation of Employees Regulations 2004 (SI 2004/3426) are a United Kingdom statutory instrument. This follows the EU Information and Consultation of Employees Directive 2002/14/EC establishing a general framework for informing and consulting employees.

== Provisions ==
The ICE Regulations require that employees are informed and consulted on all contract or workplace organisation changes. Consultation means an "obligation to negotiate" with "a view to reaching agreement". The penalty on an employer for failure to consult or follow the Regulations is up to £75,000 for each violation.

Negotiation and consultation may take place under a voluntary agreement with an employer, particularly through a trade union under a collective agreement. If there is no voluntary agreement, formal consultation procedure may be triggered by at least 2% of employees, and then requires election of a body of all staff. This procedure must "enable the information and consultation representatives to meet the employer at the relevant level of management depending on the subject under discussion".

== See also ==
- UK labour law
- European labour law

== Bibliography ==
- PL Davies and C Kilpatrick, 'UK Worker Representation after Single Channel' (2004) 33 Industrial Law Journal 121
- KD Ewing and GM Truter, 'The Information and Consultation of Employees' Regulations: Voluntarism's Bitter Legacy' (2005) 68 Modern Law Review 626
