= List of statutory instruments of the United Kingdom, 2004 (1–1700) =

This is an incomplete list of statutory instruments of the United Kingdom in 2004 (1–1700).

== 1–100 ==
- The Medicines (Pharmacy and General Sale—Exemption) Amendment Order 2004 (S.I. 2004 No. 1)
- The Prescription Only Medicines (Human Use) Amendment Order 2004 (S.I. 2004 No. 2)
- The Proceeds of Crime Act 2002 (References to Financial Investigators) (Amendment) Order 2004 (S.I. 2004 No. 8)
- The Bus Service Operators Grant (Amendment) (England) Regulations 2004 (S.I. 2004 No. 9)
- The Public Service Vehicles (Registration of Local Services) (Amendment) (England and Wales) Regulations 2004 (S.I. 2004 No. 10)
- The Scallop Fishing Order 2004 (S.I. 2004 No. 12)
- The Road Traffic (Permitted Parking Area and Special Parking Area) (County of Bedfordshire) (Districts of Mid-Bedfordshire and South Bedfordshire) Order 2004 (S.I. 2004 No. 13)
- The Housing Benefit and Council Tax Benefit (Abolition of Benefit Periods) Amendment Regulations 2004 (S.I. 2004 No. 14)
- The Companies Act 1985 (Accounts of Small and Medium-Sized Enterprises and Audit Exemption) (Amendment) Regulations 2004 (S.I. 2004 No. 16)
- The Health Authorities (Membership and Procedure) Amendment Regulations 2004 (S.I. 2004 No. 17)
- The Primary Care Trusts (Membership, Procedure and Administration Arrangements) Amendment Regulations 2004 (S.I. 2004 No. 18)
- The National Health Service Trusts (Membership and Procedure) Amendment (England) Regulations 2004 (S.I. 2004 No. 19)
- The Health Development Agency Amendment Regulations 2004 (S.I. 2004 No. 20)
- The Family Health Services Appeal Authority Amendment Regulations 2004 (S.I. 2004 No. 21)
- The European Parliament (Representation) Act 2003 (Commencement No. 3) Order 2004 (S.I. 2004 No.24 (C.1 )])
- The Health Authorities (Establishment and Abolition) (England) Amendment Order 2004 (S.I. 2004 No. 37)
- The Sea Fishing (Restriction on Days at Sea) (No. 2) (Amendment) Order 2004 (S.I. 2004 No. 38)
- The Naval Discipline Act 1957 (Remedial) Order 2004 (S.I. 2004 No. 66)
- The General Dental Council (Constitution of Committees) Amendment Order of Council 2003 (S.I. 2004 No. 67)
- The General Dental Council Continuing Professional Development Committee (Procedure) Rules Order of Council 2003 (S.I. 2004 No. 68)
- The Waste Management Licensing (Amendment) (Wales) Regulations 2004 (S.I. 2004 No. 70 (W.6))
- Rheoliadau Trwyddedu Rheoli Gwastraff (Diwygio) (Cymru) 2004 (S.I. 2004 Rhif 70 (Cy.6))
- The Welsh Language Schemes (Public Bodies) Order 2004 (S.I. 2004 No. 71 (W.7))
- Gorchymyn Cynlluniau Iaith Gymraeg (Cyrff Cyhoeddus) 2004 (S.I. 2004 Rhif 71 (Cy.7))
- Designation of Schools Having a Religious Character (Independent Schools) (England) Order 2004 (S.I. 2004 No. 72)
- The Motor Vehicle (EC Type Approval) (Amendment) Regulations 2004 (S.I. 2004 No. 73)
- The Portsmouth Hospitals National Health Service Trust (Establishment) Amendment Order 2004 (S.I. 2004 No. 75)
- The Greater London Magistrates' Courts Authority (Constitution) (Amendment) Regulations 2004 (S.I. 2004 No. 76)
- The Aviation Safety Regulations 2004 (S.I. 2004 No. 77)
- The Police and Criminal Evidence Act 1984 (Codes of Practice) (Modifications to Codes C and D) (Certain Police Areas) (Amendment) Order 2004 (S.I. 2004 No. 78)
- The London — Fishguard Trunk Road (A40) (Heol Draw Improvement) Order 2004 (S.I. 2004 No. 79 (W.9))
- Gorchymyn Cefnffordd Llundain — Abergwaun (A40) (Gwelliant Heol Draw) 2004 (S.I. 2004 Rhif 79 (Cy.9))
- The Recreation Grounds (Revocation of Parish Council Byelaws) Order 2004 (S.I. 2004 No. 80)
- The Criminal Justice Act 2003 (Commencement No. 2 and Saving Provisions) Order 2004 (S.I. 2004 No. 81 (C.2)])
- The Products of Animal Origin (Third Country Imports) (England) (Amendment) Regulations 2004 (S.I. 2004 No. 82)
- The Northern Ireland (Monitoring Commission etc.) Act 2003 (Commencement No. 2) Order 2004 (S.I. 2004 No. 83 (C.3)])
- The Social Security (Child Maintenance Premium) Amendment Regulations 2004 (S.I. 2004 No. 98)
- The Water Environment (Water Framework Directive) (Solway Tweed River Basin District) Regulations 2004 (S.I. 2004 No. 99)
- The Mink Keeping (Prohibition) (England) Order 2004 (S.I. 2004 No. 100)

== 101–200 ==
- The Social Security (Hospital In-Patients) Amendment Regulations 2004 (S.I. 2004 No. 101)
- The Price Marking Order 2004 (S.I. 2004 No. 102)
- The Health and Social Care Act 2001 (Commencement No. 6) (Wales) Order 2004 (S.I. 2004 No. 103 (W.10) (C.6))
- Gorchymyn Deddf Iechyd a Gofal Cymdeithasol 2001 (Cychwyn Rhif 6) (Cymru) 2004 (S.I. 2004 Rhif 103 (Cy.10) (C.6))
- The Road Traffic (Permitted Parking Area and Special Parking Area)(County of Carmarthenshire) Order 2004 (S.I. 2004 No. 104 (W.11))
- Gorchymyn Traffig Ffyrdd (Ardal Barcio a Ganiateir ac Ardal Barcio Arbennig)(Sir Gaerfyrddin) 2004 (S.I. 2004 Rhif 104 (Cy.11))
- The Organic Farming Scheme (Wales) (Amendment) Regulations 2004 (S.I. 2004 No. 105 (W.12))
- Rheoliadau'r Cynllun Ffermio Organig (Cymru) (Diwygio) 2004 (S.I. 2004 Rhif 105 (Cy.12))
- The Pig Carcase (Grading) (Amendment) (Wales) Regulations 2004 (S.I. 2004 No. 106 (W.13))
- Rheoliadau (Graddio) Carcasau Moch (Diwygio) (Cymru) 2004 (S.I. 2004 Rhif 106 (Cy.13))
- The Solvent Emissions (England and Wales) Regulations 2004 (S.I. 2004 No. 107)
- Hadleigh Junior School (Change to School Session Times) Order 2004 (S.I. 2004 No. 108)
- The Countryside Stewardship (Amendment)Regulations 2004 (S.I. 2004 No. 114)
- The Environmentally Sensitive Areas (Stages I–IV) Designation (Amendment) Order 2004 (S.I. 2004 No. 115)
- The Criminal Justice (Sentencing) (Programme and Electronic Monitoring Requirements) Order 2004 (S.I. 2004 No. 117)
- The Crime and Disorder Strategies (Prescribed Descriptions) (England) Order 2004 (S.I. 2004 No. 118)
- The Police Reform Act 2002 (Commencement No. 6) Order 2004 (S.I. 2004 No. 119 (C.4)])
- The City of Sheffield (Electoral Changes) Order 2004 (S.I. 2004 No. 120)
- The Borough of Doncaster (Electoral Changes) Order 2004 (S.I. 2004 No. 121)
- The City of Bradford (Electoral Changes) Order 2004 (S.I. 2004 No. 122)
- The Borough of Rotherham (Electoral Changes) Order 2004 (S.I. 2004 No. 123)
- The Borough of Oldham (Electoral Changes) Order 2004 (S.I. 2004 No. 124)
- The Borough of Rochdale (Electoral Changes) Order 2004 (S.I. 2004 No. 125)
- The City of Salford (Electoral Changes) Order 2004 (S.I. 2004 No. 126)
- The Borough of Tameside (Electoral Changes) Order 2004 (S.I. 2004 No. 127)
- The Borough of Barnsley (Electoral Changes) (Amendment) Order 2004 (S.I. 2004 No. 128)
- The Cableway Installations Regulations 2004 (S.I. 2004 No. 129)
- Legal Deposit Libraries Act 2003 (Commencement) Order 2004 (S.I. 2004 No. 130 (C.5)])
- The Food (Hot Chilli and Hot Chilli Products) (Emergency Control) (England) (Amendment) Regulations 2004 (S.I. 2004 No. 142)
- The New Opportunities Fund (Specification of Initiative) Order 2004 (S.I. 2004 No. 143)
- The Coal Industry Act 1994 (Commencement No.7) and Dissolution of the British Coal Corporation Order 2004 (S.I. 2004 No. 144 (C.6)])
- The Hill Farm Allowance Regulations 2004 (S.I. 2004 No. 145)
- The Christ's College Guildford (Designation as having a Religious Character) Order 2004 (S.I. 2004 No. 146)
- The Animals and Animal Products (Examination for Residues and Maximum Residue Limits) (Amendment) Regulations 2004 (S.I. 2004 No. 147)
- The Blyth Harbour Revision (Constitution) Order 2004 (S.I. 2004 No. 148)
- The Wycliffe C of E Primary School (Designation as having a Religious Character) Order 2004 (S.I. 2004 No. 150)
- The Disability Discrimination (Employment Field) (Leasehold Premises) Regulations 2004 (S.I. 2004 No. 153)
- The Council Tax Benefit (Abolition of Restrictions) Regulations 2004 (S.I. 2004 No. 154)
- The Betting and Gaming Duties Act 1981 (Bingo Prize Limit) Order 2004 (S.I. 2004 No. 155)
- The Regulation of Investigatory Powers (Conditions for the Lawful Interception of Persons outside the United Kingdom) Regulations 2004 (S.I. 2004 No. 157)
- The Regulation of Investigatory Powers (Designation of an International Agreement) Order 2004 (S.I. 2004 No. 158)
- The Charities (Alexandra Park and Palace) Order 2004 (S.I. 2004 No. 160)
- The Education (Student Support) (No. 2) Regulations 2002 (Amendment) Regulations 2004 (S.I. 2004 No. 161)
- The Conduct of Members (Model Code of Conduct) (Amendment) (Wales) Order 2004 (S.I. 2004 No. 163 (W.18))
- Gorchymyn Ymddygiad Aelodau (Cod Ymddygiad Enghreifftiol) (Diwygio) (Cymru) 2004 (S.I. 2004 Rhif 163 (Cy.18))
- The Social Security (Contributions) (Amendment) Regulations 2004 (S.I. 2004 No. 173)
- The Courts Act 2003 (Commencement No. 2) Order 2004 (S.I. 2004 No. 174 (C. 7)])
- The Collection of Fines (Pilot Schemes) Order 2004 (S.I. 2004 No. 175)
- The Fines Collection Regulations 2004 (S.I. 2004 No. 176)
- The M11 Motorway (Junction 4 Northbound, Redbridge) (Speed Limit) Regulations 2004 (S.I. 2004 No. 180)
- The Education (Penalty Notices) (England) Regulations 2004 (S.I. 2004 No. 181)
- The Education (Parenting Orders) (England) Regulations 2004 (S.I. 2004 No. 182)
- The Magistrates' Courts (Special Measures Directions) (Amendment) Rules 2004 (S.I. 2004 No. 184 (L. 1)])
- The Crown Court (Special Measures Directions and Directions Prohibiting Cross-examination)(Amendment) Rules 2004 (S.I. 2004 No. 185 (L. 2)])
- The Integrated Administration and Control System (Amendment) Regulations 2004 (S.I. 2004 No. 189)
- The Independent Review of Determinations (Adoption) Regulations 2004 (S.I. 2004 No. 190)

== 201–300 ==
- The Burnley (Parishes) Order 2004 (S.I. 2004 No. 214)
- The General Medical Council (Suspension and Removal of Members from Office) Rules Order of Council 2004 (S.I. 2004 No. 215)
- The European Parliamentary Elections (Appointed Day of Poll) Order 2004 (S.I. 2004 No. 217)
- The Local Government (Ordinary Day of Election) (Wales) Order 2004 (S.I. 2004 No. 218 (W.22))
- Gorchymyn Llywodraeth Leol (Diwrnod Arferol Etholiad) (Cymru) 2004 (S.I. 2004 Rhif 218 (Cy.22))
- The Domiciliary Care Agencies (Wales) Regulations 2004 (S.I. 2004 No. 219 (W.23))
- Rheoliadau Asiantaethau Gofal Cartref (Cymru) 2004 (S.I. 2004 Rhif 219 (Cy.23))
- The Social Security (Contributions) (Amendment No. 2) Regulations 2004 (S.I. 2004 No. 220)
- The Democratic Republic of Congo (Financing and Financial Assistance and Technical Advice, Assistance and Training) (Penalties and Licences) Regulations 2004 (S.I. 2004 No. 221)
- The Local Elections (Ordinary Day of Election 2004) Order 2004 (S.I. 2004 No. 222)
- The Local Elections (Principal Areas) (Amendment) (England and Wales) Rules 2004 (S.I. 2004 No. 223)
- The Local Elections (Parishes and Communities) (Amendment) (England and Wales) Rules 2004 (S.I. 2004 No. 224)
- The Local Authorities (Mayoral Elections) (England and Wales) (Amendment) Regulations 2004 (S.I. 2004 No. 225)
- The Local Authorities (Conduct of Referendums) (England) (Amendment) Regulations 2004 (S.I. 2004 No. 226)
- The Greater London Authority Elections (Amendment) Rules 2004 (S.I. 2004 No. 227)
- The Road Vehicles (Registration and Licensing) (Amendment) Regulations 2004 (S.I. 2004 No. 238)
- The Private Hire Vehicles (London) Act 1998 (Commencement No. 3) Order 2004 (S.I. 2004 No. 241 (C. 8)])
- The Private Hire Vehicles (London) (Transitional Provisions) Regulations 2004 (S.I. 2004 No. 242)
- The Local Authorities (Alteration of Requisite Calculations) (England) Regulations 2004 (S.I. 2004 No. 243)
- The Carriers' Liability (Amendment) Regulations 2004 (S.I. 2004 No. 244)
- The Food (Emergency Control) (Miscellaneous Amendments) (Wales) Regulations 2004 (S.I. 2004 No. 245 (W.24))
- Rheoliadau Bwyd (Rheolaeth Frys) (Diwygiadau Amrywiol) (Cymru) 2004 (S.I. 2004 Rhif 245 (Cy.24))
- The Sentencing Guidelines Council (Supplementary Provisions) Order 2004 (S.I. 2004 No. 246)
- The Magistrates' Courts (Parenting Orders) Rules 2004 (S.I. 2004 No. 247 (L.3)])
- The Vehicular Access Across Common and Other Land (Wales) Regulations 2004 (S.I. 2004 No. 248 (W.25))
- The Food (Provisions relating to Labelling) (Wales) Regulations 2004 (S.I. 2004 No. 249 (W.26))
- Rheoliadau Bwyd (Darpariaethau sy'n ymwneud â Labelu) (Cymru) 2004 (S.I. 2004 Rhif 249 (Cy.26))
- The Carriers' Liability (Clandestine Entrants) (Revised Code of Practice for Vehicles) Order 2004 (S.I. 2004 No. 250)
- The Carriers' Liability (Clandestine Entrants) (Level of Penalty: Revised Code of Practice) Order 2004 (S.I. 2004 No. 251)
- The Adoption and Children Act 2002 (Commencement No. 5) (Wales) Order 2004 (S.I. 2004 No. 252 (W.27) (C.9))
- Gorchymyn Deddf Mabwysiadu a Phlant 2002 (Cychwyn Rhif 5) (Cymru) 2004 (S.I. 2004 Rhif 252 (Cy.27) (C.9))
- The Housing Renewal Grants (Amendment) (Wales) Regulations 2004 (S.I. 2004 No. 253 (W.28))
- Rheoliadau Grantiau Adnewyddu Tai (Diwygio) (Cymru) 2004 (S.I. 2004 Rhif 253 (Cy.28))
- The Housing Renewal Grants (Prescribed Form and Particulars) (Amendment) (Wales) Regulations 2004 (S.I. 2004 No. 254 (W.29))
- Rheoliadau Grantiau Adnewyddu Tai (Ffurflen a Manylion Rhagnodedig) (Diwygio) (Cymru) 2004 (S.I. 2004 Rhif 254 (Cy.29))
- The Private Security Industry (Licences) Regulations 2004 (S.I. 2004 No. 255)
- Education (National Curriculum) (Attainment Targets and Programmes of Study in Modern Foreign Languages in respect of the Third Key Stage) (England) Order 2004 (S.I. 2004 No. 256)
- The Transport for London (Larcombe Close) Order 2004 (S.I. 2004 No. 257)
- The General Optical Council (Registration and Enrolment (Amendment) Rules) Order of Council 2004 (S.I. 2004 No. 258)
- General Optical Council (Disciplinary Committee (Constitution) Amendment Rules) Order of Council 2004 (S.I. 2004 No. 259)
- Education (National Curriculum) (Modern Foreign Languages) (England) Order 2004 (S.I. 2004 No. 260)
- Education (National Curriculum) (Attainment Targets and Programmes of Study in Design and Technology in respect of the First, Second and Third Key Stages) (England) Order 2004 (S.I. 2004 No. 261)
- The Social Security Revaluation of Earnings Factors Order 2004 (S.I. 2004 No. 262)
- The Social Security Pensions (Low Earnings Threshold) Order 2004 (S.I. 2004 No. 263)
- Education (National Curriculum) (Exceptions at Key Stage 4) (England) (Amendment) Regulations 2004 (S.I. 2004 No. 264)
- The Motor Vehicles (Driving Licences) (Amendment) Regulations 2004 (S.I. 2004 No. 265)
- The Common Investment Scheme 2004 (S.I. 2004 No. 266)
- The Female Genital Mutilation Act 2003 (Commencement) Order 2004 (S.I. 2004 No. 286 (C.10)])
- The National Health Service (Primary Care) Act 1997 (Commencement No. 9) Order 2004 (S.I. 2004 No. 287 (C. 11)])
- The Health and Social Care (Community Health and Standards) Act 2003 Commencement (No. 2) Order 2004 (S.I. 2004 No. 288 (C. 12)])
- The Health Act 1999 (Commencement No. 14) Order 2004 (S.I. 2004 No. 289 (C. 13)])
- The Housing Benefit and Council Tax Benefit (State Pension Credit and Miscellaneous Amendments) Regulations 2004 (S.I. 2004 No. 290)
- The National Health Service (General Medical Services Contracts) Regulations 2004 (S.I. 2004 No. 291)
- The Countryside and Rights of Way Act 2000 (Commencement No. 4) Order 2004 (S.I. 2004 No. 292 (C. 14)])
- The European Parliamentary Elections Regulations 2004 (S.I. 2004 No. 293)
- The Representation of the People (Combination of Polls) (England and Wales) Regulations 2004 (S.I. 2004 No. 294)
- The Youth Justice and Criminal Evidence Act 1999 (Commencement No. 9) Order 2004 (S.I. 2004 No. 299 (C. 15 )])
- The Greater London Authority (Allocation of Grants for Precept Calculations) Regulations 2004 (S.I. 2004 No. 300)

== 301–400 ==
- The Driving Licences (Exchangeable Licences) Order 2004 (S.I. 2004 No. 301)
- The Merchant Shipping (High Speed Craft) Regulations 2004 (S.I. 2004 No. 302)
- The Merchant Shipping (Prevention of Oil Pollution) (Amendment) Regulations 2004 (S.I. 2004 No. 303)
- The European Communities (Definition of Treaties) (Common Electoral Principles) Order 2004 (S.I. 2004 No. 304)
- The Liberia (United Nations Sanctions) (Isle of Man) Order 2004 (S.I. 2004 No. 305)
- The Liberia (United Nations Sanctions)(Channel Islands) Order 2004 (S.I. 2004 No. 306)
- The Communications (Bailiwick of Guernsey) Order 2004 (S.I. 2004 No. 307)
- The Broadcasting and Communications (Jersey) Order 2004 (S.I. 2004 No. 308)
- The Broadcasting and Communications (Isle of Man) Order 2004 (S.I. 2004 No. 309)
- The Betting and Gaming (Northern Ireland) Order 2004 (S.I. 2004 No. 310 (N.I. 1)])
- The Primary Medical Services (Northern Ireland) Order 2004 (S.I. 2004 No. 311 (N.I. 2)])
- The Dairy Produce Quotas (Amendment) Regulations 2004 (S.I. 2004 No. 312)
- The Infant Formula and Follow-on Formula (Amendment) (Wales) Regulations 2004 (S.I. 2004 No. 313 (W.31))
- Rheoliadau Fformwla Fabanod a Fformwla Ddilynol (Diwygio) (Cymru) 2004 (S.I. 2004 Rhif 313 (Cy.31))
- The Processed Cereal-based Foods and Baby Foods for Infants and Young Children (Wales) Regulations 2004 (S.I. 2004 No. 314 (W.32))
- Rheoliadau Bwydydd Proses sydd wedi'u Seilio ar Rawn a Bwydydd Babanod ar gyfer Babanod a Phlant Ifanc (Cymru) 2004 (S.I. 2004 Rhif 314 (Cy.32))
- The Countryside and Rights of Way Act 2000 (Commencement No. 4) (Wales) Order 2004 (S.I. 2004 No. 315 (W.33) (C.16))
- Gorchymyn Deddf Cefn Gwlad a Hawliau Tramwy 2000 (Cychwyn Rhif 4) (Cymru) 2004 (S.I. 2004 Rhif 315 (Cy.33) (C.16))
- The Penalties for Disorderly Behaviour (Amount of Penalty) (Amendment) Order 2004 (S.I. 2004 No. 316)
- The Removal of Obstructions from Highways (Wales) Regulations 2004 (S.I. 2004 No. 317 (W.34))
- Rheoliadau Codi Rhwystrau oddi ar Briffyrdd (Cymru) 2004 (S.I. 2004 Rhif 317 (Cy.34))
- The Trade in Controlled Goods (Embargoed Destinations) Order 2004 (S.I. 2004 No. 318)
- The Housing Benefit and Council Tax Benefit (Extended Payments (Severe Disablement Allowance and Incapacity Benefit)]) Amendment Regulations 2004 (S.I. 2004 No. 319)
- The European Parliament (Representation) Act 2003 (Commencement No. 4) Order 2004 (S.I. 2004 No. 320 (C. 17)])
- The Offshore Installations (Safety Zones) Order 2004 (S.I. 2004 No. 343)
- Commissions for Local Administration (Extension of Jurisdiction) Order 2004 (S.I. 2004 No. 344)
- The European Communities (Definition of Treaties) (Euro-Mediterranean Agreement establishing an Association between the European Communities and their Member States and the People's Democratic Republic of Algeria) Order 2004 (S.I. 2004 No. 345)
- The European Communities (Definition of Treaties) (Euro-Mediterranean Agreement establishing an Association between the European Communities and their Member States and the Republic of Lebanon) Order 2004 (S.I. 2004 No. 346)
- The Liberia (Restrictive Measures) (Overseas Territories) Order 2004 (S.I. 2004 No. 347)
- The Liberia (United Nations Sanctions) Order 2004 (S.I. 2004 No. 348)
- The Sudan (Restrictive Measures) (Overseas Territories) Order 2004 (S.I. 2004 No. 349)
- The Petroleum Licensing (Exploration and Production) (Seaward and Landward Areas) Regulations 2004 (S.I. 2004 No. 352)
- The Insurers (Reorganisation and Winding Up) Regulations 2004 (S.I. 2004 No. 353)
- Designation of Schools Having a Religious Character (Independent Schools) (England) (No.2) Order 2004 (S.I. 2004 No. 354)
- The Financial Services and Markets Act 2000 (Consequential Amendments) Order 2004 (S.I. 2004 No. 355)
- The Borough of Bolton (Electoral Changes) Order 2004 (S.I. 2004 No. 356)
- The Borough of Bury (Electoral Changes) Order 2004 (S.I. 2004 No. 357)
- The Borough of South Tyneside (Electoral Changes) Order 2004 (S.I. 2004 No. 358)
- The City of Manchester (Electoral Changes) Order 2004 (S.I. 2004 No. 359)
- The Borough of Stockport (Electoral Changes) Order 2004 (S.I. 2004 No. 360)
- The Borough of Gateshead (Electoral Changes) Order 2004 (S.I. 2004 No. 361)
- The City of Sunderland (Electoral Changes) Order 2004 (S.I. 2004 No. 362)
- The City of Newcastle upon Tyne (Electoral Changes) Order 2004 (S.I. 2004 No. 363)
- The Borough of North Tyneside (Electoral Changes) Order 2004 (S.I. 2004 No. 364)
- The Borough of Wigan (Electoral Changes) Order 2004 (S.I. 2004 No 365)
- The European Parliamentary Elections (Combined Region and Campaign Expenditure) (United Kingdom and Gibraltar) Order 2004 (S.I. 2004 No. 366)
- The Police Act 1997 (Criminal Records) (Amendment) Regulations 2004 (S.I. 2004 No. 367)
- The Industrial Training Levy (Construction Board) Order 2004 (S.I. 2004 No. 368)
- The Industrial Training Levy (Engineering Construction Board) Ord1er 2004 (S.I. 2004 No. 369)
- The Removal of Obstructions from Highways (Notices etc.) (England) Regulations 2004 (S.I. 2004 No. 370)
- The Controls On Pentabromodiphenyl Ether And Octabromodiphenyl Ether Regulations 2004 (S.I. 2004 No. 371)
- The Tax Credits (Appeals) (Amendment) Regulations 2004 (S.I. 2004 No. 372)
- The Sudan (Technical Assistance and Financing and Financial Assistance) (Penalties and Licences) Regulations 2004 (S.I. 2004 No. 373)
- The General Drainage Charges (Anglian Region) Order 2004 (S.I. 2004 No. 388)
- The Network Rail (West Coast Main Line) Order 2004 (S.I. 2004 No. 389)
- The Products of Animal Origin (Third Country Imports) (England) (Amendment No. 2) Regulations 2004 (S.I. 2004 No. 390)
- The Food (Hot Chilli and Hot Chilli Products) (Emergency Control) (Amendment) (Wales) Regulations 2004 (S.I. 2004 No. 392 (W.40))
- Rheoliadau Bwyd (Tsilis Poeth a Chynhyrchion Tsilis Poeth) (Rheolaeth Frys) (Diwygio)(Cymru) 2004 (S.I. 2004 Rhif 392 (Cy.40))
- The Consistent Financial Reporting (England) (Amendment) Regulations 2004 (S.I. 2004 No. 393)
- The Sea Fishing (Restriction on Days at Sea) Order 2004 (S.I. 2004 No. 398)
- The High Court Enforcement Officers Regulations 2004 (S.I. 2004 No. 400)

== 401–500 ==
- The Courts Act 2003 (Commencement No. 3 and Transitional Provisions) Order 2004 (S.I. 2004 No. 401 (C. 18 )])
- The Education (Pupil Exclusions) (Miscellaneous Amendments) (England) Regulations 2004 (S.I. 2004 No. 402)
- The Occupational Pension Schemes (Winding Up and Deficiency on Winding Up etc.) (Amendment) Regulations 2004 (S.I. 2004 No. 403)
- The Public Order (Prescribed Forms) Regulations (Northern Ireland) 2004 (S.I. 2004 No. 416)
- The Education (Budget Statements) (England) Regulations 2004 (S.I. 2004 No. 417)
- The Housing (Right to Buy) (Designated Rural Areas and Designated Regions) (England) Order 2004 (S.I. 2004 No. 418)
- The Proceeds of Crime Act 2002 (Recovery of Cash in Summary Proceedings: Minimum Amount) Order 2004 (S.I. 2004 No.420)
- The Town and Country Planning (Costs of Inquiries etc.) (Standard Daily Amount) (England) Regulations 2004 (S.I. 2004 No. 421)
- The Terrorism Act 2000 (Continuance of Part VII) Order 2004 (S.I. 2004 No. 431)
- The Liberia (Technical Assistance and Financing and Financial Assistance) (Penalties and Licences) Regulations 2004 (S.I. 2004 No. 432)
- The General Medical Services Transitional and Consequential Provisions Order 2004 (S.I. 2004 No. 433)
- The Pollution Prevention and Control (Unauthorised Part B Processes) (England and Wales) Regulations 2004 (S.I. 2004 No. 434)
- The St. Mary's National Health Service Trust (Trust Funds: Appointment of Trustees) Order 2004 (S.I. 2004 No. 435)
- The Special Trustees for St. Mary's Hospital (Transfer of Trust Property) Order 2004 (S.I. 2004 No. 436)
- The Employment Equality (Religion or Belief) (Amendment) Regulations 2004 (S.I. 2004 No. 437)
- The Capital Gains Tax (Gilt-edged Securities) Order 2004 (S.I. 2004 No. 438)
- The Urban Regeneration Companies (Tax) (Designation) Order 2004 (S.I. 2004 No. 439)
- The Income Support (General) (Standard Interest Rate Amendment) Regulations 2004 (S.I. 2004 No. 440)
- School Budget Shares (Prescribed Purposes) (England) (Amendment) Regulations 2004 (S.I. 2004 No. 444)
- The M11 London-Cambridge Motorway (Redbridge-Stump Cross Section) Scheme 1970 (Revocation) Scheme 2001 Revocation Scheme 2004 (S.I. 2004 No. 445)
- The M11 London to Cambridge Motorway (Stansted Airport Spur Roads and Connecting Roads at Birchanger) Scheme 1985 Revocation Scheme 2004 (S.I. 2004 No. 446)
- The Schools Forums (England) (Amendment) Regulations 2004 (S.I. 2004 No. 447)
- The M11 Motorway (Thremhall Avenue Connecting Roads) Scheme 2004 (S.I. 2004 No. 448)
- The A66 Trunk Road (Darlington Eastern Transport Corridor) Order 2004 (S.I. 2004 No. 449)
- School Governance (Constitution, Procedures and New Schools) (England) (Amendment) Regulations 2004 (S.I. 2004 No. 450)
- The Local Authorities (Alteration of Requisite Calculations) (Wales) Regulations 2004 (S.I. 2004 No. 451 (W.42))
- Rheoliadau Awdurdodau Lleol (Addasu Cyfrifiadau Gofynnol) (Cymru) 2004 (S.I. 2004 Rhif 451 (Cy.42))
- The Council Tax (Prescribed Classes of Dwellings) (Wales) (Amendment) Regulations 2004 (S.I. 2004 No. 452 (W.43))
- Rheoliadau'r Dreth Gyngor (Dosbarthau Rhagnodedig ar Anheddau) (Cymru) (Diwygio) 2004 (S.I. 2004 Rhif 452 (Cy.43))
- The Financial Services and Markets Act 2000 (Appointed Representatives) (Amendment) Regulations 2004 (S.I. 2004 No. 453)
- The Financial Services and Markets Act 2000 (Transitional Provisions) (Complaints Relating to General Insurance and Mortgages) Order 2004 (S.I. 2004 No. 454)
- The Kava-kava in Food (England) (Amendment) Regulations 2004 (S.I. 2004 No. 455)
- Health and Safety (Fees) Regulations 2004 (S.I. 2004 No. 456)
- The Local Authorities (Capital Finance) (Amendment) (England) Regulations 2004 (S.I. 2004 No. 459)
- The Council Tax (Demand Notices) (Wales) (Amendment) Regulations 2004 (S.I. 2004 No. 460 (W.45))
- Rheoliadau'r Dreth Gyngor (Hysbysiadau Galw am Dalu) (Cymru) (Diwygio) 2004 (S.I. 2004 Rhif 460 (Cy.45))
- The Goods Vehicles (Licensing of Operators) (Temporary Use in Great Britain) (Amendment) Regulations 2004 (S.I. 2004 No. 462)
- The Health and Safety at Work etc. Act 1974 (Application to Environmentally Hazardous Substances) (Amendment) Regulations 2004 (S.I. 2004 No. 463)
- The Northern Ireland Arms Decommissioning Act 1997 (Amnesty Period) Order 2004 (S.I. 2004 No. 464)
- The North West Surrey Mental Health National Health Service Partnership Trust (Transfer of Trust Property) Order 2004 (S.I. 2004 No. 465)
- The West Sussex Health and Social Care National Health Service Trust (Transfer of Trust Property) Order 2004 (S.I. 2004 No. 466)
- The Maidstone and Tunbridge Wells National Health Service Trust (Transfer of Trust Property) Order 2004 (S.I. 2004 No. 467)
- The West Kent National Health Service and Social Care Trust (Transfer of Trust Property) Order 2004 (S.I. 2004 No. 468)
- The Cheshire and Wirral Partnership National Health Service Trust (Establishment) and the Wirral and West Cheshire Community National Health Service Trust (Dissolution) Amendment Order 2004 (S.I. 2004 No. 469)
- The Regulatory Reform (Sunday Trading) Order 2004 (S.I. 2004 No. 470)
- The Kingston Primary Care Trust (Transfer of Trust Property) Order 2004 (S.I. 2004 No. 471)
- The Insolvency (Amendment) Regulations 2004 (S.I. 2004 No 472)
- The Insolvency Practitioners (Amendment) Regulations 2004 (S.I. 2004 No. 473)
- The Immigration (Provision of Physical Data) (Amendment) Regulations 2004 (S.I. 2004 No. 474)
- The Immigration (Leave to Enter and Remain) (Amendment) Order 2004 (S.I. 2004 No. 475)
- The Insolvency Practitioners and Insolvency Services Account (Fees) (Amendment) Order 2004 (S.I. 2004 No. 476)
- The General Medical Services Transitional and Consequential Provisions (Wales) Order 2004 (S.I. 2004 No. 477 (W.47))
- The National Health Service (General Medical Services Contracts) (Wales) Regulations 2004 (S.I. 2004 No. 478 (W.48))
- The Health and Social Care (Community Health and Standards) Act 2003 (Commencement No. 1) (Wales) Order 2004 (S.I. 2004 No. 480 (W.49) (C.19))
- The Fire Services (Appointments and Promotion) (England and Wales) Regulations 2004 (S.I. 2004 No. 481)
- The Valuation Tribunals (Amendment) (England) Order 2004 (S.I. 2004 No. 482)
- The Care Standards Act 2000 (Commencement No.19) (England) Order 2004 (S.I. 2004 No. 484 (C.20)])
- The Local Authorities (Goods and Services)(Public Bodies)(England) Order 2004 (S.I. 2004 No. 485)
- The Leeds Teaching Hospitals National Health Service Trust (Establishment) Amendment Order 2004 (S.I. 2004 No. 487)
- The Statutory Paternity Pay and Statutory Adoption Pay (Amendment) Regulations 2004 (S.I. 2004 No. 488)

== 501–600 ==
- The School Governance (Transition from an Interim Executive Board) (England) Regulations 2004 (S.I. 2004 No. 530)
- The Gaming Act (Variation of Fees) Order 2004 (S.I. 2004 No. 531)
- The Lotteries (Gaming Board Fees) Order 2004 (S.I. 2004 No. 532)
- The Local Authorities (Capital Finance) (Consequential, Transitional and Saving Provisions) Order 2004 (S.I. 2004 No. 533)
- The Local Authorities (Capital Finance and Accounting) (Amendment) (England) Regulations 2004 (S.I. 2004 No. 534)
- The Cumbria (Coroners' Districts) (No. 2) Order 2004 (S.I. 2004 No. 535)
- The Berkshire (Coroners' Districts) Order 2004 (S.I. 2004 No. 536)
- The Guaranteed Minimum Pensions Increase Order 2004 (S.I. 2004 No. 537)
- The Road Traffic (Permitted Parking Area and Special Parking Area) (County of Bedfordshire) (Districts of Mid-Bedfordshire and South Bedfordshire) (Amendment) Order 2004 (S.I. 2004 No. 538)
- The Public Benefit Corporation (Register of Members) Regulations 2004 (S.I. 2004 No. 539)
- The Patients' Forums and Commission for Patient and Public Involvement in Health (Miscellaneous Amendments) Regulations 2004 (S.I. 2004 No. 540)
- The North Essex Mental Health Partnership National Health Service Trust (Transfer of Trust Property) Order 2004 (S.I. 2004 No. 541)
- The Wolverhampton City Primary Care Trust (Transfer of Trust Property) Order 2004 (S.I. 2004 No. 542)
- The Primary Care Trusts (Establishment) Amendment Order 2004 (S.I. 2004 No.543)
- Office of Communications Act 2002 (Commencement No. 3) and Communications Act 2003 (Commencement No. 2) (Amendment) Order 2004 (S.I. 2004 No. 545 (C.21)])
- The Insurers (Reorganisation and Winding Up) (Amendment) Regulations 2004 (S.I. 2004 No. 546)
- The Insolvency Proceedings (Monetary Limits) (Amendment) Order 2004 (S.I. 2004 No. 547)
- The Education (Individual Pupil Information) (Prescribed Persons) (Wales) Regulations 2004 (S.I. 2004 No. 549 (W.53))
- Rheoliadau Addysg (Gwybodaeth am Ddisgyblion Unigol) (Personau Rhagnodedig) (Cymru) 2004 (S.I. 2004 Rhif 549 (Cy.53))
- The Health Professions Wales (Transfer of Staff, Property, Rights and Liabilities) Order 2004 (S.I. 2004 No. 550 (W.54))
- Gorchymyn Proffesiynau Iechyd Cymru (Trosglwyddo Staff, Eiddo, Hawliau a Rhwymedigaethau) 2004 (S.I. 2004 Rhif 550 (Cy.54))
- The Health Professions Wales (Establishment, Membership, Constitution and Functions) Order 2004 (S.I. 2004 No. 551 (W.55))
- Gorchymyn Proffesiynau Iechyd Cymru (Sefydlu, Aelodaeth, Cyfansoddiad a Swyddogaethau) 2004 (S.I. 2004 Rhif 551 (Cy.55))
- The Social Security Benefits Up-rating Order 2004 (S.I. 2004 No. 552)
- The Jam and Similar Products (Wales) Regulations 2004 (S.I. 2004 No. 553 (W.56))
- Rheoliadau Cynhyrchion Jam a Chynhyrchion Tebyg (Cymru) 2004 (S.I. 2004 Rhif 553 (Cy.56))
- The Miscellaneous Food Additives (Amendment) (Wales) Regulations 2004 (S.I. 2004 No. 554 (W.57))
- Rheoliadau Ychwanegion Bwyd Amrywiol (Diwygio) (Cymru) 2004 (S.I. 2004 Rhif 554 (Cy.57))
- The Commission for Social Care Inspection (Explanation and Co-operation) Regulations 2004 (S.I. 2004 No. 555)
- The Accounts and Audit (Amendment) Regulations 2004 (S.I. 2004 No. 556)
- The Commission for Healthcare Audit and Inspection (Explanation, Statements of Action and Co-operation) Regulations 2004 (S.I. 2004 No. 557)
- The Pensions Increase (Valuation Tribunal Service) Regulations 2004 (S.I. 2004 No. 558)
- The Zimbabwe (Sale, Supply, Export, Technical Assistance, Financing and Financial Assistance and Shipment of Equipment) (Penalties and Licences) Regulations 2004 (S.I. 2004 No. 559)
- The Road Traffic (NHS Charges) Amendment Regulations 2004 (S.I. 2004 No. 560)
- The General Social Care Council (Description of Persons to be Treated as Social Care Workers) Regulations 2004 (S.I. 2004 No. 561)
- The General Social Care Council (Registration) (Description of Social Care Workers) Order 2004 (S.I. 2004 No. 562)
- The Nottinghamshire Healthcare National Health Service Trust (Transfer of Trust Property) Order 2004 (S.I. 2004 No. 563)
- The Social Security Administration (Fraud) Act 1997 (Commencement No. 8) Order 2004 (S.I. 2004 No. 564 (C. 22)])
- The Social Security (Miscellaneous Amendments) Regulations 2004 (S.I. 2004 No. 565)
- Asylum Support (Interim Provisions) (Amendment) Regulations 2004 (S.I. 2004 No. 566)
- The Health and Social Care (Community Health and Standards) Act 2003 (Isles of Scilly) Order 2004 (S.I. 2004 No. 567)
- The Carriage of Dangerous Goods and Use of Transportable Pressure Equipment Regulations 2004 (S.I. 2004 No. 568)
- The NHS Direct (Establishment and Constitution) Order 2004 (S.I. 2004 No. 569)
- The NHS Direct Regulations 2004 (S.I. 2004 No. 570)
- The Education (Hazardous Equipment and Materials) (England) Regulations 2004 (S.I. 2004 No. 571)
- The Street Works (Inspection Fees) (England) (Amendment) Regulations 2004 (S.I. 2004 No. 572)
- The Local Government Pension Scheme (Amendment) Regulations 2004 (S.I. 2004 No. 573)
- The Housing Benefit and Council Tax Benefit (Supply of Information) Amendment Regulations 2004 (S.I. 2004 No. 574)
- The Taxation of Benefits under Government Pilot Schemes (Working Neighbourhoods Pilot and In Work Credit) Order 2004 (S.I. 2004 No. 575)
- The Social Security (Claims and Payments) Amendment Regulations 2004 (S.I. 2004 No. 576)
- Designation of Schools Having a Religious Character (Independent Schools) (England) (No. 3) Order 2004 (S.I. 2004 No. 577)
- The Social Security (Industrial Injuries) (Dependency) (Permitted Earnings Limits) Order 2004 (S.I. 2004 No. 578)
- The Travel Documents (Fees) (Amendment) Regulations 2004 (S.I. 2004 No. 579)
- The Immigration (Leave to Remain) (Fees) (Amendment) Regulations 2004 (S.I. 2004 No. 580)
- The Immigration (Leave to Remain) (Prescribed Forms and Procedures) (Amendment) Regulations 2004 (S.I. 2004 No. 581)
- The Workmen's Compensation (Supplementation) (Amendment) Scheme 2004 (S.I. 2004 No. 582)
- The Social Security Benefits Up-rating Regulations 2004 (S.I. 2004 No. 583)
- The Insolvency (Amendment) Rules 2004 (S.I. 2004 No. 584)
- The National Health Service (Performers Lists) Regulations 2004 (S.I. 2004 No. 585)
- The Tower Hamlets Housing Action Trust (Dissolution) Order 2004 (S.I. 2004 No. 586)
- The Teachers' Pensions (Amendment) Regulations 2004 (S.I. 2004 No. 587)
- The National Health Service Trusts (Originating Capital) Order 2004 (S.I. 2004 No. 588)
- The Local Government (Best Value) Performance Indicators and Performance Standards (Amendment) Order 2004 (S.I. 2004 No. 589)
- The Common Agricultural Policy Non-IACS Support Schemes (Appeals) (England) Regulations 2004 (S.I. 2004 No. 590)
- The Kingston-upon-Hull City Council (School Meals) Order 2004 (S.I. 2004 No. 592)
- The Insolvency Proceedings (Fees) Order 2004 (S.I. 2004 No. 593)
- The Tribunals and Inquiries (Dairy Produce Quota Tribunal) Order 2004 (S.I. 2004 No. 594)
- The Land Registration Fee Order 2004 (S.I. 2004 No. 595)
- The Blood Tests (Evidence of Paternity) (Amendment) Regulations 2004 (S.I. 2004 No. 596)
- The Community Legal Service (Funding) (Amendment) Order 2004 (S.I. 2004 No. 597)
- The Criminal Defence Service (Choice in Very High Cost Cases)(Amendment) Regulations 2004 (S.I. 2004 No. 598)

== 601–700 ==
- The Service Subsidy Agreements (Tendering) (England) (Amendment) Regulations 2004 (S.I. 2004 No. 609)
- The Merchant Shipping (Light Dues) (Amendment) Regulations 2004 (S.I. 2004 No. 610)
- The National Health Service (Charges to Overseas Visitors) (Amendment) Regulations 2004 (S.I. 2004 No. 614)
- The Commission for Social Care Inspection (Children's Rights Director) Regulations 2004 (S.I. 2004 No. 615)
- The Education (National Curriculum) (Foundation Stage Profile Assessment Arrangements) (England) (Amendment) Order 2004 (S.I. 2004 No. 622)
- The Motor Vehicles (Approval) (Amendment) Regulations 2004 (S.I. 2004 No. 623)
- The National Health Service (Personal Medical Services Agreements) Regulations 2004 (S.I. 2004 No. 627)
- National Health Service (General Medical Services Contracts) (Prescription of Drugs etc.) Regulations 2004 (S.I. 2004 No. 629)
- The Police Reform Act 2002 (Commencement No. 7) Order 2004 (S.I. 2004 No. 636 (C.23)])
- The Environmental Protection (Waste Recycling Payments) (England) Regulations 2004 (S.I. 2004 No. 639)
- The Wildlife and Countryside (Registration and Ringing of Certain Captive Birds) (England) (Amendment) Regulations 2004 (S.I. 2004 No. 640)
- The Water Act 2003 (Commencement No. 1 and Transitional Provisions) Order 2004 (S.I. 2004 No. 641 (C.24)])
- The National Health Service (Optical Charges and Payments) and (General Ophthalmic Services) Amendment Regulations 2004 (S.I. 2004 No. 642)
- The Police (Complaints and Misconduct) Regulations 2004 (S.I. 2004 No. 643)
- The Police Authorities (Best Value) Performance Indicators Order 2004 (S.I. 2004 No. 644)
- The Police (Conduct) Regulations 2004 (S.I. 2004 No. 645)
- The Income-related Benefits (Subsidy to Authorities) Amendment Order 2004 (S.I. 2004 No. 646)
- The State Pension Credit (Miscellaneous Amendments) Regulations 2004 (S.I. 2004 No. 647)
- The NHS Professionals Special Health Authority (Establishment and Constitution) Amendment Order 2004 (S.I. 2004 No. 648)
- The Food for Particular Nutritional Uses (Addition of Substances for Specific Nutritional Purposes) (England) (Amendment) Regulations 2004 (S.I. 2004 No. 649)
- The Ministry of Defence Police Appeal Tribunals Regulations 2004 (S.I. 2004 No. 652)
- The Ministry of Defence Police (Conduct) Regulations 2004 (S.I. 2004 No. 653)
- The Ministry of Defence Police (Conduct) (Senior Officers) Regulations 2004 (S.I. 2004 No. 654)
- The Architects (Professional Conduct Committee) Amendment Order 2004 (S.I. 2004 No. 655)
- The Natural Mineral Water, Spring Water and Bottled Drinking Water (Amendment) (England) Regulations 2004 (S.I. 2004 No. 656)
- The Blackburn with Darwen (Maintained Nursery School Governance) Order 2004 (S.I. 2004 No. 657)
- The Education (School Teachers' Pay and Conditions) Order 2004 (S.I. 2004 No. 658)
- The LEA Budget, Schools Budget and Individual Schools Budget and the Financing of Maintained Schools (No. 2) (Amendment) (England) Regulations 2004 (S.I. 2004 No. 659)
- The Independent Police Complaints Commission (Staff Conduct) Regulations 2004 (S.I. 2004 No. 660)
- The Commission for Healthcare Audit and Inspection (Fees and Frequency of Inspections) Regulations 2004 (S.I. 2004 No. 661)
- The Commission for Social Care Inspection (Fees and Frequency of Inspections) Regulations 2004 (S.I. 2004 No. 662)
- The National Health Service (Charges for Drugs and Appliances) and (Travel Expenses and Remission of Charges) Amendment Regulations 2004 (S.I. 2004 No. 663)
- The Health and Social Care (Community Health and Standards) Act 2003 (Commission for Healthcare Audit and Inspection and Commission for Social Care Inspection) (Transitional and Consequential Provisions) Order 2004 (S.I. 2004 No.664)
- The National Health Service (Pension Scheme and Injury Benefits) Amendment Regulations 2004 (S.I. 2004 No. 665)
- The Medicines for Human Use and Medical Devices (Fees Amendments) Regulations 2004 (S.I. 2004 No. 666)
- The NHS Pensions Agency (Asiantaeth Pensiynau'r GIG) (Establishment and Constitution) Order 2004 (S.I. 2004 No. 667)
- The NHS Pensions Agency (Asiantaeth Pensiynau'r GIG) Regulations 2004 (S.I. 2004 No. 668)
- The Commonhold and Leasehold Reform Act 2002 (Commencement No. 2 and Savings) (Wales) Order 2004 (S.I. 2004 No. 669 (W.62) (C.25))
- Gorchymyn Deddf Cyfunddaliad a Diwygio Cyfraith Lesddaliad 2002 (Cychwyn Rhif 2 ac Arbedion) (Cymru) 2004 (S.I. 2004 Rhif 669 (Cy.62) (C.25))
- The Leasehold Reform (Collective Enfranchisement and Lease Renewal) (Amendment) (Wales) Regulations 2004 (S.I. 2004 No. 670 (W.63))
- Rheoliadau Diwygio Cyfraith Lesddaliad (Rhyddfreinio ar y Cyd ac Adnewyddu Lesddaliad) (Diwygio) (Cymru) 2004 (S.I. 2004 Rhif 670 (Cy.63))
- The Independent Police Complaints Commission (Transitional Provisions) Order 2004 (S.I. 2004 No. 671)
- The Independent Police Complaints Commission (Forces Maintained Otherwise than by Police Authorities) Order 2004 (S.I. 2004 No. 672)
- The High Court Enforcement Officers (Amendment) Regulations 2004 (S.I. 2004 No. 673)
- The Recovery of Duties and Taxes Etc. Due in Other Member States (Corresponding UK Claims, Procedure and Supplementary) Regulations 2004 (S.I. 2004 No. 674)
- The RTM Companies (Memorandum and Articles of Association) (Wales) Regulations 2004 (S.I. 2004 No. 675 (W.64))
- Rheoliadau Cwmnïau RTM (Memorandwm ac Erthyglau Cymdeithasu) (Cymru) 2004 (S.I. 2004 Rhif 675 (Cy.64))
- The Pesticides (Maximum Residue Levels in Crops, Food and Feeding Stuffs) (England and Wales)(Amendment) Regulations 2004 (S.I. 2004 No. 676)
- The Leasehold Valuation Tribunals (Service Charges, Insurance or Appointment of Managers Applications) (Revocation and Saving) (Wales) Order 2004 (S.I. 2004 No. 677 (W.65))
- Gorchymyn Tribiwnlysoedd Prisio Lesddaliadau (Taliadau Gwasanaeth, Yswiriant neu Geisiadau am Benodi Rheolwyr) (Dirymu ac Arbed) (Cymru) 2004 (S.I. 2004 Rhif 677 (Cy.65))
- The Right to Manage (Prescribed Particulars and Forms) (Wales) Regulations 2004 (S.I. 2004 No. 678 (W.66))
- Rheoliadau'r Hawl i Reoli (Manylion a Ffurf Rhagnodedig) (Cymru) 2004 (S.I. 2004 Rhif 678 (Cy.66))
- The Inspection of Youth Support Services in Wales Regulations 2004 (S.I. 2004 No. 679 (W.67))
- Rheoliadau Arolygu Gwasanaethau Cymorth Ieuenctid Cymru 2004 (S.I. 2004 Rhif 679 (Cy.67))
- The Leasehold Valuation Tribunals (Fees) (Revocation and Saving) (Wales) Order 2004 (S.I. 2004 No. 680 (W.68))
- Gorchymyn Tribiwnlysoedd Prisio Lesddaliadau (Ffioedd) (Dirymu ac Arbed) (Cymru) 2004 (S.I. 2004 Rhif 680 (Cy.68))
- The Leasehold Valuation Tribunals (Procedure) (Wales) Regulations 2004 (S.I. 2004 No. 681 (W.69))
- Rheoliadau Tribiwnlysoedd Prisio Lesddaliadau (Gweithdrefn) (Cymru) 2004 (S.I. 2004 Rhif 681 (Cy.69))
- The Leasehold Valuation Tribunals (Fees) (Wales) Regulations 2004 (S.I. 2004 No. 683 (W.71))
- Rheoliadau Tribiwnlysoedd Prisio Lesddaliadau (Ffioedd) (Cymru) 2004 (S.I. 2004 Rhif 683 (Cy.71))
- The Service Charges (Consultation Requirements) (Wales) Regulations 2004 (S.I. 2004 No. 684 (W.72))
- Rheoliadau Taliadau Gwasanaeth (Gofynion Ymgynghori) (Cymru) 2004 (S.I. 2004 Rhif 684 (Cy.72))
- The Common Agricultural Policy Non-IACS Support Schemes (Appeals) (Wales) Regulations 2004 (S.I. 2004 No. 685 (W.73))
- Rheoliadau Cynlluniau Cymorth y Polisi Amaethyddol Cyffredin nad ydynt yn rhai IACS (Apelau) (Cymru) 2004 (S.I. 2004 Rhif 685 (Cy.73))
- The Kimberley Process (Fees) Regulations 2004 (S.I. 2004 No. 686)
- The Finance Act 2002 Section 140 (Appointed Day) Order 2004 (S.I. 2004 No. 689 (C.27)])
- The Anti-social Behaviour Act 2003 (Commencement No. 2) Order 2004 (S.I. 2004 No. 690 (C. 26)])
- The Awards for All (England) Joint Scheme (Authorisation) Order 2004 (S.I. 2004 No. 691)
- The Communications (Television Licensing) Regulations 2004 (S.I. 2004 No. 692)
- The Enterprise Act 2002 (Part 9 Restrictions on Disclosure of Information) (Specification) Order 2004 (S.I. 2004 No. 693)
- The Evaluation of Active Substances for Pesticides (Fees) (Amendment) Regulations 2004 (S.I. 2004 No. 694)
- The Fees for Assessment of Active Substances (Third Stage Review) Regulations 2004 (S.I. 2004 No. 695)
- The Health and Social Care (Community Health and Standards) Act 2003 (Supplementary and Consequential Provision) (NHS Foundation Trusts) Order 2004 (S.I. 2004 No. 696)
- Office of Communications Act 2002 (Commencement No. 3) and Communications Act 2003 (Commencement No. 2) (Amendment No. 2) Order 2004 (S.I. 2004 No. 697 (C.28)])
- The Statutory Maternity Pay (Compensation of Employers) Amendment Regulations 2004 (S.I. 2004 No. 698)
- The Leasehold Reform (Enfranchisement and Extension) (Amendment) (Wales) Regulations 2004 (S.I. 2004 No. 699 (W.74))
- Rheoliadau Diwygio Lesddaliad (Rhyddfreinio ac Estyn) (Diwygio) (Cymru) 2004 (S.I. 2004 Rhif 699 (Cy.74))
- The European Parliament (Representation) Act 2003 (Commencement No. 5) Order 2004 (S.I. 2004 No. 700 (C. 30)])

== 701–800 ==
- The Water Industry (Prescribed Conditions) (Undertakers Wholly or Mainly in Wales) Regulations 2004 (S.I. 2004 No. 701 (W.75))
- The Firearms (Northern Ireland) Order 2004 (S.I. 2004 No. 702 (N.I. 3)])
- The Rates (Amendment) (Northern Ireland) Order 2004 (S.I. 2004 No. 703 (N.I. 4)])
- The Prison (Amendment) (Northern Ireland) Order 2004 (S.I. 2004 No. 704 (N.I. 5)])
- The Air Navigation (Amendment) Order 2004 (S.I. 2004 No. 705)
- The European Communities (Designation) Order 2004 (S.I. 2004 No. 706)
- The Budget (Northern Ireland) Order 2004 (S.I. 2004 No. 707 (N.I. 6)])
- The Naval, Military and Air Forces Etc. (Disablement and Death) Service Pensions (Amendment) Order 2004 (S.I. 2004 No. 708)
- The Care Council for Wales (Specification of Student Social Workers) (Registration) Order 2004 (S.I. 2004 No. 709 (W.76))
- Gorchymyn Cyngor Gofal Cymru (Pennu Gweithwyr Cymdeithasol o dan Hyfforddiant) (Cofrestru) 2004 (S.I. 2004 Rhif 709 (Cy.76))
- The Care Standards Act 2000 (Extension of Meaning of Social Care Worker) (Wales) Regulations 2004 (S.I. 2004 No. 711 (W.78))
- Rheoliadau Deddf Safonau Gofal 2000 (Ehangu Ystyr Gweithiwr Gofal Cymdeithasol) (Cymru) 2004 (S.I. 2004 Rhif 711 (Cy.78))
- The Research and Development (Prescribed Activities) Regulations 2004 (S.I. 2004 No. 712)
- The Education (Inspectors of Schools in England) Order 2004 (S.I. 2004 No. 713)
- The International Criminal Court Act 2001 (Isle of Man) Order 2004 (S.I. 2004 No. 714)
- The Communications (Bailiwick of Guernsey) (No.2) Order 2004 (S.I. 2004 No. 715)
- The Broadcasting and Communications (Jersey) (No. 2) Order 2004 (S.I. 2004 No. 716)
- The Personal Injuries (Civilians) (Amendment) Scheme 2004 (S.I. 2004 No. 717)
- The Broadcasting and Communications (Isle of Man) (No.2) Order 2004 (S.I. 2004 No. 718)
- The Advocacy Services and Representations Procedure (Children) (Amendment) Regulations 2004 (S.I. 2004 No. 719)
- The Borough of Trafford (Electoral Changes) Order 2004 (S.I. 2004 No. 720)
- The City of Peterborough (Electoral Changes) (Amendment) Order 2004 (S.I. 2004 No. 721)
- The Welfare Food (Amendment) Regulations 2004 (S.I. 2004 No. 723)
- The European Convention on Cinematographic Co-production (Amendment) Order 2004 (S.I. 2004 No. 724)
- The Pneumoconiosis etc. (Workers' Compensation) (Payment of Claims) (Amendment) Regulations 2004 (S.I. 2004 No. 726)
- The Children (Leaving Care) Social Security Benefits (Scotland) Regulations 2004 (S.I. 2004 No. 747)
- The Public Record Office (Fees) Regulations 2004 (S.I. 2004 No. 750)
- The Anti-terrorism, Crime and Security Act 2001 (Continuance in force of sections 21 to 23) Order 2004 (S.I. 2004 No. 751)
- The Employment Act 2002 (Dispute Resolution) Regulations 2004 (S.I. 2004 No. 752)
- The ACAS Arbitration Scheme (Great Britain) Order 2004 (S.I. 2004 No. 753)
- The Compromise Agreements (Description of Person) Order 2004 (S.I. 2004 No. 754)
- The Immigration (Restrictions on Employment) Order 2004 (S.I. 2004 No. 755)
- The Civil Aviation (Working Time) Regulations 2004 (S.I. 2004 No. 756)
- Docklands Light Railway (Woolwich Arsenal Extension) Order 2004 (S.I. 2004 No. 757)
- The Pensions Increase (Review) Order 2004 (S.I. 2004 No. 758)
- The Health and Social Care (Community Health and Standards) Act 2003 Commencement (No.3) Order 2004 (S.I. 2004 No. 759 (C. 29 )])
- The National Assistance (Sums for Personal Requirements and Assessment of Resources) (Amendment) (England) Regulations 2004 (S.I. 2004 No. 760)
- The Child Benefit and Guardian's Allowance (Miscellaneous Amendments) Regulations 2004 (S.I. 2004 No. 761)
- The Tax Credits (Miscellaneous Amendments) Regulations 2004 (S.I. 2004 No. 762)
- The Asylum Support (Amendment) Regulations 2004 (S.I. 2004 No. 763)
- The SS Osmund and Andrew RC Primary School (Designation as having a Religious Character) Order 2004 (S.I. 2004 No. 764)
- The Tobacco Advertising and Promotion (Point of Sale) Regulations 2004 (S.I. 2004 No. 765)
- The West Hampshire National Health Service Trust (Change of Name and Establishment) Amendment Order 2004 (S.I. 2004 No. 766)
- The Value Added Tax (Amendment) Regulations 2004 (S.I. 2004 No. 767)
- The General Betting Duty (Amendment) Regulations 2004 (S.I. 2004 No. 768)
- The Landfill Tax (Amendment) Regulations 2004 (S.I. 2004 No. 769)
- The Social Security (Contributions, Categorisation of Earners and Intermediaries) (Amendment) Regulations 2004 (S.I. 2004 No. 770)
- The Inheritance Tax (Indexation) Order 2004 (S.I. 2004 No. 771)
- The Income Tax (Indexation) Order 2004 (S.I. 2004 No. 772)
- The Retirement Benefit Schemes (Indexation of Earnings Cap) Order 2004 (S.I. 2004 No. 773)
- The Capital Gains Tax (Annual Exempt Amount) Order 2004 (S.I. 2004 No. 774)
- The Value Added Tax (Increase of Registration Limits) Order 2004 (S.I. 2004 No. 775)
- The Value Added Tax (Consideration for Fuel Provided for Private Use) Order 2004 (S.I. 2004 No. 776)
- The Value Added Tax (Reduced Rate) Order 2004 (S.I. 2004 No. 777)
- The Value Added Tax (Buildings and Land) Order 2004 (S.I. 2004 No. 778)
- The Value Added Tax (Special Provisions) (Amendment) Order 2004 (S.I. 2004 No. 779)
- The Criminal Justice and Court Services Act 2000 (Commencement No. 12) Order 2004 (S.I. 2004 No. 780 (C. 31)])
- The Housing Benefit and Council Tax Benefit (Miscellaneous Amendments) Regulations 2004 (S.I. 2004 No. 781)
- The Inspection of Education and Training (Amendment) (Wales) Regulations 2004 (S.I. 2004 No. 783 (W.80))
- Rheoliadau Arolygu Addysg a Hyfforddiant (Diwygio) (Cymru) 2004 (S.I. 2004 Rhif 783 (Cy.80))
- The Education (School Inspection) (Amendment) (Wales) Regulations 2004 (S.I. 2004 No. 784 (W.81))
- Rheoliadau Addysg (Arolygu Ysgolion) (Diwygio) (Cymru) 2004 (S.I. 2004 Rhif 784 (Cy.81))
- The Council Tax (Administration and Enforcement) (Amendment) (Wales) Regulations 2004 (S.I. 2004 No. 785 (W.82))
- Rheoliadau'r Dreth Gyngor (Gweinyddu a Gorfodi) (Diwygio) (Cymru) 2004 (S.I. 2004 Rhif 785 (Cy.82))
- The Crime (International Co-operation) Act 2003 (Commencement No. 1) Order 2004 (S.I. 2004 No. 786 (C.32)])
- The Crime (International Co-operation) Act 2003 (Savings) Order 2004 (S.I. 2004 No. 787)
- The Courts Act 2003 (Commencement No. 4) Order 2004 (S.I. 2004 No. 798 (C. 33)])
- The Public Trustee (Fees) (Amendment) Order 2004 (S.I. 2004 No. 799)
- The Recovery of Agricultural Levies Due in Other Member States Regulations 2004 (S.I. 2004 No. 800)

== 801–900 ==
- The Immigration Services Commissioner (Designated Professional Body) (Fees) Order 2004 (S.I. 2004 No. 801)
- The Immigration Services Commissioner (Registration Fee) Order 2004 (S.I. 2004 No. 802)
- The Library Advisory Council for Wales Abolition and Consequential Amendments Order 2004 (S.I. 2004 No. 803 (W.83))
- Gorchymyn Diddymu Cyngor Ymgynghorol Llyfrgelloedd Cymru a Diwygiadau Canlyniadol 2004 (S.I. 2004 Rhif 803 (Cy.83))
- The LEA Budget, Schools Budget and Individual Schools Budget (Wandsworth) (Amendment) Regulations 2004 (S.I. 2004 No. 804)
- The Independent Police Complaints Commission (Investigatory Powers) Order 2004 (S.I. 2004 No. 815)
- The Zimbabwe (Freezing of Funds and Economic Resources) Regulations 2004 (S.I. 2004 No. 816)
- The Friendly Societies (Modification of the Corporation Tax Acts) (Amendment) Regulations 2004 (S.I. 2004 No. 822)
- The Railways and Transport Safety Act 2003 (Commencement No. 2) Order 2004 (S.I. 2004 No. 827 (C. 34)])
- The Pet Travel Scheme (Pilot Arrangements) (England) (Amendment) Order 2004 (S.I. 2004 No. 828)
- The Criminal Justice Act 2003 (Commencement No.3 and Transitional Provisions) Order 2004 (S.I. 2004 No.829 (C.35)])
- Controlled Drugs (Substances Useful for Manufacture) (Intra-Community Trade) (Amendment) Regulations 2004 (S.I. 2004 No. 850)
- The Income Tax (Pay As You Earn) (Amendment) Regulations 2004 (S.I. 2004 No. 851)
- The Animals and Animal Products (Import and Export) Regulations 2004 (S.I. 2004 No. 853)
- The Warwickshire Ambulance Service National Health Service Trust (Change of Name) Order 2004 (S.I. 2004 No. 864)
- The General Medical Services and Personal Medical Services Transitional and Consequential Provisions Order 2004 (S.I. 2004 No. 865)
- The Health and Social Care (Community Health and Standards) Act 2003 Commencement (No. 2) (Amendment) Order 2004 (S.I. 2004 No. 866 (C. 36)])
- The Social Security (Basic Skills Training Pilot) Regulations 2004 (S.I. 2004 No. 867)
- The Social Security (Intensive Activity Period 50 to 59 Pilot) Regulations 2004 (S.I. 2004 No. 868)
- The Social Security (Intensive Activity Period 50 to 59 Pilot)(No.2) Regulations 2004 (S.I. 2004 No. 869)
- The Local Authorities (Conduct of Referendums) (Wales) Regulations 2004 (S.I. 2004 No. 870 (W.85))
- Rheoliadau Awdurdodau Lleol (Cynnal Refferenda) (Cymru) 2004 (S.I. 2004 Rhif 870 (Cy.85))
- The National Health Service (Travelling Expenses and Remission of Charges) (Amendment) (Wales) Regulations 2004 (S.I. 2004 No. 871 (W.86))
- Rheoliadau'r Gwasanaeth Iechyd Gwladol (Treuliau Teithio a Pheidio â Chodi Tâl) (Diwygio) (Cymru) 2004 (S.I. 2004 Rhif 871 (Cy.86))
- The Education (Induction Arrangements for School Teachers) (Amendment) (Wales) Regulations 2004 (S.I. 2004 No. 872 (W.87))
- Rheoliadau Addysg (Trefniadau Ymsefydlu ar gyfer Athrawon Ysgol) (Diwygio) (Cymru) 2004 (S.I. 2004 Rhif 872 (Cy.87))
- The Health and Social Care (Community Health and Standards) Act 2003 Commencement (No. 2) (Wales) Order 2004 (S.I. 2004 No. 873 (W.88) (C.37))
- Gorchymyn Deddf Iechyd a Gofal Cymdeithasol (Iechyd Cymunedol a Safonau) 2003 Cychwyn (Rhif 2) (Cymru) 2004 (S.I. 2004 Rhif 873 (Cy.88) (C.37))
- The Sexual Offences Act 2003 (Commencement) Order 2004 (S.I. 2004 No. 874 (C.38)])
- The Sexual Offences Act 2003 (Prescribed Police Stations) Regulations 2004 (S.I. 2004 No. 875)
- The Social Security (Contributions) (Re-rating and National Insurance Funds Payments) Order 2004 (S.I. 2004 No. 889)

== 901–1000 ==
- The Woking Area Primary Care Trust (Change of Name) Order 2004 (S.I. 2004 No. 904)
- Community Health Councils Regulations 2004 (S.I. 2004 No. 905 (W.89))
- Rheoliadau Cynghorau Iechyd Cymuned 2004 (S.I. 2004 Rhif 905 (Cy.89))
- The Primary Medical Services (Sale of Goodwill and Restrictions on Sub-contracting) Regulations 2004 (S.I. 2004 No. 906)
- The Welsh Development Agency (Derelict Land) Order 2004 (S.I. 2004 No. 907 (W.90))
- Gorchymyn Awdurdod Datblygu Cymru (Tir Diffaith) 2004 (S.I. 2004 Rhif 907 (Cy.90))
- The Education (School Organisation Proposals) (Wales) (Amendment) Regulations 2004 (S.I. 2004 No. 908 (W.91))
- Rheoliadau Addysg (Cynigion Trefniadaeth Ysgolion) (Cymru) (Diwygio) 2004 (S.I. 2004 Rhif 908 (Cy.91))
- The Litter and Dog Fouling (Fixed Penalty) (Wales) Order 2004 (S.I. 2004 No. 909 (W.92))
- Gorchymyn Sbwriel a Baeddu gan Gwn (Cosb Benodedig) (Cymru) 2004 (S.I. 2004 Rhif 909 (Cy.92))
- The Water Act 2003 (Commencement) (Wales) Order 2004 (S.I. 2004 No. 910 (W.93)(C.39))
- Gorchymyn Deddf Dŵr 2003 (Cychwyn) (Cymru) 2004 (S.I. 2004 Rhif 910 (Cy.93) (C.39))
- The Dairy Produce Quotas (Wales) (Amendment) Regulations 2004 (S.I. 2004 No. 911 (W.94))
- Rheoliadau Cwotâu Cynnyrch Llaeth (Cymru) (Diwygio) 2004 (S.I. 2004 Rhif 911 (Cy.94))
- The Education Act 2002 (Commencement No. 4 and Transitional Provisions) (Wales) Order 2004 (S.I. 2004 No. 912 (W.95) (C.40))
- Gorchymyn Deddf Addysg 2002 (Cychwyn Rhif 4 a Darpariaethau Trosiannol) (Cymru) 2004 (S.I. 2004 Rhif 912 (Cy.95) (C.40))
- The Police Reform Act 2002 (Commencement No. 8) Order 2004 (S.I. 2004 No. 913 (C.41)])
- The Road Traffic (Permitted Parking Area and Special Parking Area) (County of Surrey) (District of Mole Valley) Order 2004 (S.I. 2004 No. 914)
- Railway Safety Accreditation Scheme Regulations 2004 (S.I. 2004 No. 915)
- The Private Security Industry Act 2001 (Modification of Local Enactments) Order 2004 (S.I. 2004 No. 916)
- The Private Security Industry Act 2001 (Designated Activities) Order 2004 (S.I. 2004 No. 917)
- The Education (Penalty Notices) (England) (Amendment) Regulations 2004 (S.I. 2004 No. 920)
- The Coroners (Amendment) Rules 2004 (S.I. 2004 No. 921)
- The National Health Service (Pharmaceutical Services) (Amendment) Regulations 2004 (S.I. 2004 No. 922)
- The Paternity and Adoption Leave (Amendment) Regulations 2004 (S.I. 2004 No. 923)
- The Renewables Obligation (Amendment) Order 2004 (S.I. 2004 No. 924)
- The Statutory Paternity Pay and Statutory Adoption Pay (Weekly Rates) (Amendment) Regulations 2004 (S.I. 2004 No. 925)
- The Council Tax (Prescribed Classes of Dwellings) (Amendment) (England) Regulations 2004 (S.I. 2004 No. 926)
- The Council Tax (Administration and Enforcement) (Amendment) (England) Regulations 2004 (S.I. 2004 No. 927)
- The Local Government Pension Scheme and Discretionary Compensation (Members of County and County Borough Councils in Wales) Regulations 2004 (S.I. 2004 No. 928)
- The Merchant Shipping (Gas Carriers) (Amendment) Regulations 2004 (S.I. 2004 No. 929)
- The Merchant Shipping (Dangerous or Noxious Liquid Substances in Bulk) (Amendment) Regulations 2004 (S.I. 2004 No. 930)
- The Merchant Shipping (Liability of Shipowners and Others) (New Rate of Interest) Order 2004 (S.I. 2004 No. 931)
- The Milton Keynes (Urban Area and Planning Functions) Order 2004 (S.I. 2004 No. 932)
- The Gunfleet Sands Offshore Wind Farm Order 2004 (S.I. 2004 No. 933)
- The Employment Zones (Allocation to Contractors) Pilot Regulations 2004 (S.I. 2004 No. 934)
- The Enterprise Act 2002 (Part 8) (Designation of the Financial Services Authority as a Designated Enforcer) Order 2004 (S.I. 2004 No 935)
- The National Health Service (Travel Expenses and Remission of Charges) and (Optical Charges and Payments) and (General Ophthalmic Services) Amendment Regulations 2004 (S.I. 2004 No. 936)
- The Freedom of Information (Additional Public Authorities) Order 2004 (S.I. 2004 No. 938)
- The Tax Credits Up-rating Regulations 2004 (S.I. 2004 No. 941)
- The Child Benefit and Guardian's Allowance Up-rating Order 2004 (S.I. 2004 No. 942)
- The Child Benefit and Guardian's Allowance Up-rating (Northern Ireland) Order 2004 (S.I. 2004 No. 943)
- The Social Security (Contributions) (Re-rating) Consequential Amendment Regulations 2004 (S.I. 2004 No. 944)
- The Communications Act 2003 (Consequential Amendments) Order 2004 (S.I. 2004 No. 945)
- The Trade Marks (Proof of Use, etc.) Regulations 2004 (S.I. 2004 No. 946)
- The Trade Marks (Amendment) Rules 2004 (S.I. 2004 No. 947)
- The Trade Marks (International Registration) (Amendment) Order 2004 (S.I. 2004 No. 948)
- The Community Trade Mark (Amendment) Regulations 2004 (S.I. 2004 No. 949)
- The NHS Professionals Special Health Authority (Establishment and Constitution) Revocation and Amendment Order 2004 (S.I. 2004 No. 951)
- The Financial Services and Markets Act 2000 (Transitional Provisions, Repeals and Savings) (Financial Services Compensation Scheme) (Amendment) Order 2004 (S.I. 2004 No. 952)
- The Scotland Act 1998 (Designation of Receipts) Order 2004 (S.I. 2004 No. 953)
- The Rail Vehicle Accessibility (Midland Mainline Class 222 Vehicles) Exemption Order 2004 (S.I. 2004 No. 954)
- The Rail Vehicle Accessibility (CrossCountry Trains Class 220 and Class 221) Exemption Order 2004 (S.I. 2004 No. 955)
- The Local Government in Scotland Act 2003 (Destination of Fixed Penalties in Scotland) Order 2004 (S.I. 2004 No. 956 (S. 1)])
- The Primary Medical Services (Scotland) Act 2004 (Consequential Modifications) Order 2004 (S.I. 2004 No. 957 (S. 2)])
- The Sunday Working (Scotland) Act 2003 (Commencement No. 1) Order 2004 (S.I. 2004 No. 958 (C. 42)])
- The Social Security (Working Neighbourhoods) Regulations 2004 (S.I. 2004 No. 959)
- The Guardian's Allowance Up-rating Regulations 2004 (S.I. 2004 No. 960)
- The Social Security (Income-Related Benefits Self-Employment Route Amendment) Regulations 2004 (S.I. 2004 No. 963)
- The Milk Development Council (Amendment) Order 2004 (S.I. 2004 No. 964)
- The Transport for London (White City) Order 2004 (S.I. 2004 No. 965)
- The Good Laboratory Practice (Codification Amendments Etc.) Regulations 2004 (S.I. 2004 No. 994)
- The Pigs (Records, Identification and Movement) (Wales) Order 2004 (S.I. 2004 No. 996 (W.104))
- Gorchymyn Moch (Cofnodion, Adnabod a Symud) (Cymru) 2004 (S.I. 2004 Rhif 996 (Cy.104))
- The Anti-Social Behaviour Act 2003 (Commencement No.1) (Wales) Order 2004 (S.I. 2004 No. 999 (W.105) (C.43))
- Gorchymyn Deddf Ymddygiad Gwrthgymdeithasol 2003 (Cychwyn Rhif 1) (Cymru) 2004 (S.I. 2004 Rhif 999 (Cy.105) (C.43))
- The Non-Domestic Rating (Miscellaneous Provisions) (Amendment) (Wales) Regulations 2004 (S.I. 2004 No. 1000 (W.106))
- Rheoliadau Ardrethu Annomestig (Darpariaethau Amrywiol) (Diwygio) (Cymru) 2004 (S.I. 2004 Rhif 1000 (Cy.106))

== 1001–1100 ==
- The Stratford-on-Avon (Parishes) Order 2004 (S.I. 2004 No. 1001)
- The Customs and Excise Duties (Travellers' Allowances and Personal Reliefs)(New Member States) Order 2004 (S.I. 2004 No. 1002)
- The Excise Duty Points (Etc.)(New Member States) Regulations 2004 (S.I. 2004 No. 1003)
- The Channel Tunnel (Alcoholic Liquor and Tobacco Products)(Amendment) Order 2004 (S.I. 2004 No. 1004)
- The Landlord and Tenant Act 1954, Part 2 (Notices) Regulations 2004 (S.I. 2004 No. 1005)
- The Education Maintenance Allowance (Pilot Areas) (Revocation) Regulations 2004 (S.I. 2004 No. 1006)
- The Police Act 1997 (Criminal Records) (Fees) Order 2004 (S.I. 2004 No. 1007)
- The Jobseeker's Allowance (Amendment) Regulations 2004 (S.I. 2004 No. 1008)
- The Health and Social Care (Community Health and Standards) Act 2003 Commencement (No.2) (Amendment No.2) Order 2004 (S.I. 2004 No. 1009 (C. 44)])
- The Local Authorities (Capital Finance and Accounting) (Wales) (Amendment) Regulations 2004 (S.I. 2004 No. 1010 (W.107))
- The Adoption Support Services (Local Authorities) (Wales) Regulations 2004 (S.I. 2004 No. 1011 (W.108))
- Rheoliadau Gwasanaethau Cymorth Mabwysiadu (Awdurdodau Lleol) (Cymru) 2004 (S.I. 2004 Rhif 1011 (Cy.108))
- The Food for Particular Nutritional Uses (Addition of Substances for Specific Nutritional Purposes) (Wales) (Amendment) Regulations 2004 (S.I. 2004 No. 1012 (W.109))
- Rheoliadau Bwyd at Ddefnydd Maethol Neilltuol (Ychwanegu Sylweddau at Ddibenion Maethol Penodol) (Cymru) (Diwygio) 2004 (S.I. 2004 Rhif 1012 (Cy.109))
- The Council Tax (Administration and Enforcement) and the Non-Domestic Rating (Collection and Enforcement) (Local Lists) (Amendment) (Wales) Regulations 2004 (S.I. 2004 No. 1013 (W.110))
- Rheoliadau'r Dreth Gyngor (Gweinyddu a Gorfodi) ac Ardrethu Annomestig (Casglu a Gorfodi) (Rhestri Lleol) (Diwygio) (Cymru) 2004 (S.I. 2004 Rhif 1013 (Cy.110))
- The National Health Service (Optical Charges and Payments) and (General Ophthalmic Services) (Amendment) (Wales) Regulations 2004 (S.I. 2004 No. 1014 (W.111))
- Rheoliadau'r Gwasanaeth Iechyd Gwladol (Ffioedd a Thaliadau Optegol) a (Gwasanaethau Offthalmig Cyffredinol) (Diwygio) (Cymru) 2004 (S.I. 2004 Rhif 1014 (Cy.111))
- The Care Standards Act 2000 (Commencement No. 13) (Wales) Order 2004 (S.I. 2004 No. 1015 (W.112) (C.45))
- Gorchymyn Deddf Safonau Gofal 2000 (Cychwyn Rhif 13) (Cymru) 2004 (S.I. 2004 Rhif 1015 (Cy.112) (C.45))
- The General Medical Services Transitional and Consequential Provisions (Wales) (No. 2) Order 2004 (S.I. 2004 No. 1016 (W.113))
- The Primary Medical Services (Sale of Goodwill and Restrictions on Sub-contracting) (Wales) Regulations 2004 (S.I. 2004 No. 1017 (W.114))
- The National Health Service (Pharmaceutical Services etc.), (Repeatable Prescriptions) (Amendment) (Wales) Regulations 2004 (S.I. 2004 No. 1018 (W.115))
- Rheoliadau'r Gwasanaeth Iechyd Gwladol (Gwasanaethau Fferyllol etc.) (Presgripsiynau Amlroddadwy) (Diwygio) (Cymru) 2004 (S.I. 2004 Rhif 1018 (Cy.115))
- The Health and Social Care (Community Health and Standards) Act 2003 (Commencement No. 1) (Wales) (Amendment) Order 2004 (S.I. 2004 No. 1019 (W.116) (C.46))
- The National Health Service (Performers Lists) (Wales) Regulations 2004 (S.I. 2004 No. 1020 (W.117))
- The National Health Service (Pharmaceutical Services) (Amendment) (Wales) Regulations 2004 (S.I. 2004 No. 1021 (W.118))
- The National Health Service (General Medical Services Contracts) (Prescription of Drugs Etc.) (Wales) Regulations 2004 (S.I. 2004 No. 1022 (W.119))
- The National Assistance (Assessment of Resources) (Amendment) (Wales) Regulations 2004 (S.I. 2004 No. 1023 (W.120))
- Rheoliadau Cymorth Gwladol (Asesu Adnoddau) (Diwygio) (Cymru) 2004 (S.I. 2004 Rhif 1023 (Cy.120))
- The National Assistance (Sums for Personal Requirements)(Wales) Regulations 2004 (S.I. 2004 No. 1024 (W.121))
- Rheoliadau Cymorth Gwladol (Symiau at Anghenion Personol) (Cymru) 2004 (S.I. 2004 Rhif 1024 (Cy.121))
- The Education (School Performance Information) (Wales) Regulations 2004 (S.I. 2004 No. 1025 (W.122))
- Rheoliadau Addysg (Gwybodaeth am Berfformiad Ysgolion) (Cymru) 2004 (S.I. 2004 Rhif 1025 (Cy.122))
- The Education (Pupil Information) (Wales) Regulations 2004 (S.I. 2004 No. 1026 (W.123))
- Rheoliadau Addysg (Gwybodaeth am Ddisgyblion) (Cymru) 2004 (S.I. 2004 Rhif 1026 (Cy.123))
- The Football Spectators (European Championship Control Period) Order 2004 (S.I. 2004 No. 1029)
- Education (Student Loans) (Amendment) (England and Wales) Regulations 2004 (S.I. 2004 No. 1030)
- The Medicines for Human Use (Clinical Trials) Regulations 2004 (S.I. 2004 No. 1031)
- The Value Added Tax Tribunals (Amendment) Rules 2004 (S.I. 2004 No. 1032)
- The Civil Procedure (Modification of Supreme Court Act 1981) Order 2004 (S.I. 2004 No. 1033)
- The Crime (International Co-operation) Act 2003 (Designation of Prosecuting Authorities) Order 2004 (S.I. 2004 No. 1034)
- The European Parliament (Representation) Act 2003 (Commencement No. 6) Order 2004 (S.I. 2004 No. 1035 (C.47)])
- The Feedingstuffs (Zootechnical Products) and Medicated Feedingstuffs (Amendment) (England, Scotland and Wales) Regulations 2004 (S.I. 2004 No. 1036)
- The Driver and Vehicle Licensing Agency Trading Fund Order 2004 (S.I. 2004 No. 1037)
- The Education (Mandatory Awards) (Amendment) Regulations 2004 (S.I. 2004 No. 1038)
- The Privacy and Electronic Communications (EC Directive) (Amendment) Regulations 2004 (S.I. 2004 No. 1039)
- The Local Elections (Parishes and Communities) (Amendment) (No. 2) (England and Wales) Rules 2004 (S.I. 2004 No. 1040)
- The Local Elections (Principal Areas) (Amendment) (No. 2) (England and Wales) Rules 2004 (S.I. 2004 No. 1041)
- The National Health Service (Travelling Expenses and Remission of Charges) and (Optical Charges and Payments) and (General Ophthalmic Services) (Amendment) (Wales) Regulations 2004 (S.I. 2004 No. 1042 (W.124))
- Rheoliadau'r Gwasanaeth Iechyd Gwladol (Treuliau Teithio a Pheidio â Chodi Tâl) a (Ffioedd a Thaliadau Optegol) a (Gwasanaethau Offthalmig Cyffredinol) (Diwygio) (Cymru) 2004 (S.I. 2004 Rhif 1042 (Cy.124))
- The Employment Zones (Amendment) Regulations 2004 (S.I. 2004 No. 1043)
- The Immigration Employment Document (Fees) (Amendment) Regulations 2004 (S.I. 2004 No. 1044)
- The Credit Institutions (Reorganisation and Winding up) Regulations 2004 (S.I. 2004 No. 1045)
- The Common Agricultural Policy (Wine) (England and Northern Ireland) (Amendment) Regulations 2004 (S.I. 2004 No. 1046)
- The Crown Court (Amendment) Rules 2004 (S.I. 2004 No. 1047 (L. 4)])
- The Magistrates' Courts (Crime (International Co-operation)]) Rules 2004 (S.I. 2004 No. 1048 (L.5)])
- The Trade in Controlled Goods (Embargoed Destinations) (Amendment) Order 2004 (S.I. 2004 No. 1049)
- The Export of Goods, Transfer of Technology and Provision of Technical Assistance (Control) (Amendment) Order 2004 (S.I. 2004 No. 1050)
- The Magistrates' Courts (Foreign Travel Orders) Rules 2004 (S.I. 2004 No. 1051)
- The Magistrates' Courts (Notification Orders) Rules 2004 (S.I. 2004 No. 1052)
- The Magistrates' Courts (Risk of Sexual Harm Orders) Rules 2004 (S.I. 2004 No. 1053)
- The Magistrates' Courts (Sexual Offences Prevention Orders) Rules 2004 (S.I. 2004 No. 1054)
- The Community Legal Service (Scope) Regulations 2004 (S.I. 2004 No. 1055)
- The European Parliamentary Elections (Returning Officers) Order 2004 (S.I. 2004 No. 1056)
- The Stamp Duty Land Tax (Amendment of Part 4 of the Finance Act 2003) Regulations 2004 (S.I. 2004 No.1069)
- The Insolvency (Amendment No. 2) Rules 2004 (S.I. 2004 No. 1070)
- The Housing (Right to Buy) (Priority of Charges) (England) Order 2004 (S.I. 2004 No. 1071)
- The Greater Manchester (Light Rapid Transit System) (Exemptions) Order 2004 (S.I. 2004 No. 1072)
- The Borough of Rochdale (Electoral Changes) (Amendment) Order 2004 (S.I. 2004 No. 1073)
- The Income Tax (Sub-contractors in the Construction Industry) (Amendment) Regulations 2004 (S.I. 2004 No. 1075)
- The Education (Modifications to Requirements for Pupil Performance Information) (England) Regulations 2004 (S.I. 2004 No. 1076)
- The Competition Act 1998 (Concurrency) Regulations 2004 (S.I. 2004 No. 1077)
- The Competition Act 1998 (Appealable Decisions and Revocation of Notification of Excluded Agreements) Regulations 2004 (S.I. 2004 No.1078)
- The EC Merger Control (Consequential Amendments) Regulations 2004 (S.I. 2004 No. 1079)
- The International Criminal Court Act 2001 (Elements of Crimes) Regulations 2004 (S.I. 2004 No. 1080)
- The Independent Review of Determinations (Adoption) (Amendment) Regulations 2004 (S.I. 2004 No.1081)
- The Value Added Tax (Amendment) (No. 2) Regulations 2004 (S.I. 2004 No. 1082)
- The National Health Service (Dental Charges) Amendment Regulations 2004 (S.I. 2004 No. 1091)
- The Independent Police Complaints Commission (Transitional Provisions) (Amendment) Order 2004 (S.I. 2004 No.1092)

== 1101–1200 ==
- The Courts Act 2003 (Commencement No. 5) Order 2004 (S.I. 2004 No. 1104 (C. 48 )])
- The Northern Ireland Act 2000 (Modification) Order 2004 (S.I. 2004 No. 1105)
- The Anglian Water Parks Byelaws (Extension) Order 2004 (S.I. 2004 No. 1106)
- The Merchant Shipping (Passenger Ships on Domestic Voyages) (Amendment) Regulations 2004 (S.I. 2004 No. 1107)
- The Agricultural Statistics (Northern Ireland) Order 2004 (S.I. 2004 No. 1109 (N.I. 7)])
- The European Communities (Designation) (No. 2) Order 2004 (S.I. 2004 No. 1110)
- The Overseas Territories (Zimbabwe) (Restrictive Measures) (Amendment) Order 2004 (S.I. 2004 No. 1111)
- The Liberia (Restrictive Measures) (Overseas Territories) (Amendment) Order 2004 (S.I. 2004 No. 1112)
- The Liberia (United Nations Sanctions) (Channel Islands) (Amendment) Order 2004 (S.I. 2004 No. 1113)
- The Broadcasting and Communications (Jersey) (No. 3) Order 2004 (S.I. 2004 No. 1114)
- The Broadcasting and Communications (Isle of Man) (No. 3) Order 2004 (S.I. 2004 No. 1115)
- The Communications (Bailiwick of Guernsey) (No. 3) Order 2004 (S.I. 2004 No. 1116)
- The European Communities (Services of Lawyers) (Amendment) Order 2004 (S.I. 2004 No. 1117)
- The Health Service Commissioner for England (Special Health Authorities) Order 2004 (S.I. 2004 No. 1119)
- The Liberia (United Nations Sanctions) (Isle of Man) (Amendment) Order 2004 (S.I. 2004 No. 1120)
- The International Joint Investigation Teams (International Agreement) Order 2004 (S.I. 2004 No. 1127)
- The Regulation of Investigatory Powers (Foreign Surveillance Operations) Order 2004 (S.I. 2004 No. 1128)
- The National Health Service (Optical Charges and Payments) and (General Ophthalmic Services) (Miscellaneous Amendments) Regulations 2004 (S.I. 2004 No.1138)
- The Occupational Pension Schemes (Winding Up) (Amendment) Regulations 2004 (S.I. 2004 No. 1140)
- The Social Security (Miscellaneous Amendments) (No. 2) Regulations 2004 (S.I. 2004 No. 1141)
- The Food (Jelly Confectionery) (Emergency Control) (England) (Amendment) Regulations 2004 (S.I. 2004 No. 1151)
- The Medicines for Human Use (Clinical Trials Fees Amendments) Regulations 2004 (S.I. 2004 No. 1157)
- The Local Authorities (Functions and Responsibilities) (Amendment) (England) Regulations 2004 (S.I. 2004 No.1158)
- The Plant Protection Products (Fees) (Amendment) Regulations 2004 (S.I. 2004 No. 1159)
- The St Luke's Catholic Sixth Form College (Designation as having a Religious Character) Order 2004 (S.I. 2004 No. 1160)
- The National Minimum Wage Regulations 1999 (Amendment) Regulations 2004 (S.I. 2004 No. 1161)
- The Waste and Emissions Trading Act 2003 (Commencement No.1) Order 2004 (S.I. 2004 No. 1163 (C.49 )])
- The Northern Ireland Act 1998 and Northern Ireland Act 2000 (Modification) Order 2004 (S.I. 2004 No. 1164)
- The Potatoes Originating in Egypt (England) Regulations 2004 (S.I. 2004 No. 1165)
- The Disability Discrimination (Questions and Replies) Order 2004 (S.I. 2004 No. 1168)
- The St Margaret's Anfield Church of England Primary School (Designation as having a Religious Character) Order 2004 (S.I. 2004 No. 1169)
- The Education (Student Loans) (Repayment) (Amendment) Regulations 2004 (S.I. 2004 No. 1175)
- The Local Government (Best Value) Performance Indicators and Performance Standards (Amendment) (No. 2) Order 2004 (S.I. 2004 No. 1176)
- The Electronic Commerce (EC Directive) (Extension) Regulations 2004 (S.I. 2004 No. 1178)
- The Electricity (Exemption from the Requirement for a Generation Licence) Order 2004 (S.I. 2004 No. 1179)
- The Packaging (Essential Requirements) (Amendment) Regulations 2004 (S.I. 2004 No. 1188)
- The Prescription Only Medicines (Human Use) Amendment (No. 2) Order 2004 (S.I. 2004 No.1189)
- The Medicines (Pharmacy and General Sale—Exemption) Amendment (No. 2) Order 2004 (S.I. 2004 No. 1190)
- The Yeovil Schools (School Day and School Year Regulations) Order 2004 (S.I. 2004 No. 1191)
- The Courts Boards Areas Order 2004 (S.I. 2004 No. 1192)
- The Courts Boards (Appointments and Procedure) Regulations 2004 (S.I. 2004 No. 1193)
- The King's College London Act 1978 (Amendment) Order 2004 (S.I. 2004 No. 1194)
- The Criminal Defence Service (Recovery of Defence Costs Orders) (Amendment) Regulations 2004 (S.I. 2004 No. 1195)
- The Criminal Defence Service (General) (No.2) (Amendment) Regulations 2004 (S.I. 2004 No. 1196)

== 1201–1300 ==
- The Nationality, Immigration and Asylum Act 2002 (Commencement No. 7) Order 2004 (S.I. 2004 No. 1201 (C. 50 )])
- The Animal Gatherings (England) Order 2004 (S.I. 2004 No. 1202)
- The Sustainable Energy Act 2003 (Commencement No. 2) Order 2004 (S.I. 2004 No. 1203 (C.51)])
- The Returning Officers (Parliamentary Constituencies) (Wales) (Amendment) Order 2004 (S.I. 2004 No.1204)
- The Rail Vehicle Accessibility (Seaton Tramway Tramcars 9, 10 and 11) Exemption Order 2004 (S.I. 2004 No. 1205)
- The Stamp Duty Land Tax (Amendment of Part 4 of the Finance Act 2003) (No. 2) Regulations 2004 (S.I. 2004 No. 1206)
- The Products of Animal Origin (Third Country Imports) (England) Regulations 2004 (S.I. 2004 No. 1214)
- Education (National Curriculum)(Attainment Targets and Programmes of Study in Science in respect of the First, Second Third and Fourth Key Stages)(England) Order 2004 (S.I. 2004 No. 1217)
- The Agricultural Holdings (Units of Production) (Wales) Order 2004 (S.I. 2004 No. 1218 (W.133))
- Gorchymyn Daliadau Amaethyddol (Unedau Cynhyrchu) (Cymru) 2004 (S.I. 2004 Rhif 1218 (Cy.133))
- The Accession (Immigration and Worker Registration) Regulations 2004 (S.I. 2004 No. 1219)
- The Sexual Offences Act 2003 (Travel Notification Requirements) Regulations 2004 (S.I. 2004 No. 1220)
- The Cableway Installations (Amendment) Regulations 2004 (S.I. 2004 No.1230)
- The Town and Country Planning (London Borough of Camden) Special Development Order 2004 (S.I. 2004 No. 1231)
- The Social Security (Habitual Residence) Amendment Regulations 2004 (S.I. 2004 No. 1232)
- The Local Elections (Communities) (Welsh Forms) Order 2004 (S.I. 2004 No. 1233)
- The Local Elections (Principal Areas) (Welsh Forms) Order 2004 (S.I. 2004 No. 1234)
- The Allocation of Housing and Homelessness (Amendment) (England) Regulations 2004 (S.I. 2004 No.1235)
- The Immigration (European Economic Area) and Accession (Amendment) Regulations 2004 (S.I. 2004 No. 1236)
- The Sea Fishing (Enforcement of Community Quota and Third Country Fishing Measures) (England) Order 2004 (S.I. 2004 No. 1237)
- The Crime Prevention (Designated Areas) Order 2004 (S.I. 2004 No. 1239)
- The Child Benefit and Guardian's Allowance (Administration) (Amendment) Regulations 2004 (S.I. 2004 No. 1240)
- The Tax Credits (Miscellaneous Amendments No. 2) Regulations 2004 (S.I. 2004 No. 1241)
- The Nuclear Safeguards Act Commencement (No.1) Order 2004 (S.I. 2004 No. 1242 (C.52)])
- The Tax Credits (Residence) (Amendment) Regulations 2004 (S.I. 2004 No. 1243)
- The Child Benefit (General) (Amendment) Regulations 2004 (S.I. 2004 No. 1244)
- The European Parliament (Number of MEPs) (United Kingdom and Gibraltar) Order 2004 (S.I. 2004 No. 1245)
- The European Parliament (Disqualification) (United Kingdom and Gibraltar) Order 2004 (S.I. 2004 No. 1246)
- The Nuclear Safeguards (Notification) Regulations 2004 (S.I. 2004 No. 1255)
- The EC/Swiss Air Transport Agreement (Consequential Amendments) Regulations 2004 (S.I. 2004 No. 1256)
- The Burma (Freezing of Funds and Economic Resources) Regulations 2004 (S.I. 2004 No. 1257)
- Public Lending Right Scheme 1982 (Commencement of Variations) Order 2004 (S.I. 2004 No. 1258)
- The Competition Act 1998 (Determination of Turnover for Penalties) (Amendment) Order 2004 (S.I. 2004 No. 1259)
- The Competition Act 1998 (Land Agreements Exclusion and Revocation) Order 2004 (S.I. 2004 No. 1260)
- The Competition Act 1998 and Other Enactments (Amendment) Regulations 2004 (S.I. 2004 No. 1261)
- The Food (Jelly Confectionery) (Emergency Control) (Wales) (Amendment) Regulations 2004 (S.I. 2004 No. 1262 (W.134))
- The Liberia (Freezing of Funds and Economic Resources) Regulations 2004 (S.I. 2004 No. 1264)
- The Food (Emergency Control) (England) (Miscellaneous Amendments) Regulations 2004 (S.I. 2004 No. 1265)
- The Merchant Shipping (Updating of References to Maritime Conventions) Regulations 2004 (S.I. 2004 No. 1266)
- The European Parliamentary Elections (Northern Ireland) Regulations 2004 (S.I. 2004 No 1267)
- The Private Security Industry Act 2001 (Modification of Local Enactments) (No. 2) Order 2004 (S.I. 2004 No. 1268)
- The Nurses Agencies (Amendment) Regulations 2004 (S.I. 2004 No. 1269)
- The Cash Ratio Deposits (Value Bands and Ratios) Order 2004 (S.I. 2004 No. 1270)
- The Criminal Justice Act 1988 (Offensive Weapons) (Amendment) Order 2004 (S.I. 2004 No. 1271)
- The Mental Health (Amendment) (Northern Ireland) Order 2004 (S.I. 2004 No. 1272 (N.I. 8)])
- The Merchant Shipping (Convention on Limitation of Liability for Maritime Claims) (Amendment) Order 2004 (S.I. 2004 No. 1273)
- The Double Taxation Relief (Taxes on Income) (New Zealand) Order 2004 (S.I. 2004 No. 1274)
- The Traffic Signs (Amendment) General Directions 2004 (S.I. 2004 No. 1275)
- The Working Tax Credit (Entitlement and Maximum Rate) (Amendment) Regulations 2004 (S.I. 2004 No. 1276)
- The Tobacco Advertising and Promotion (Specialist Tobacconists) Regulations 2004 (S.I. 2004 No. 1277)
- The Road Traffic (Permitted Parking Area and Special Parking Area) (County of Surrey) (Borough of Guildford) Order 2004 (S.I. 2004 No. 1278)
- The Education (Outturn Statements) (England) Regulations 2004 (S.I. 2004 No. 1279)
- The Mersey Docks and Harbour Company (Liverpool Landing Stage Extension) Harbour Revision Order 2004 (S.I. 2004 No. 1280)
- The Recreation Grounds (Revocation of Parish Council Byelaws) (No. 2) Order 2004 (S.I. 2004 No. 1281)
- The Preparatory Commission for the Comprehensive Nuclear-Test-Ban Treaty Organization (Immunities and Privileges) Order 2004 (S.I. 2004 No. 1282)
- The European Communities (Designation) (No.3) Order 2004 (S.I. 2004 No. 1283)
- The Merchant Shipping (Confirmation of Legislation and Repeals) (Jersey) Order 2004 (S.I. 2004 No. 1284)
- The Road Traffic (Permitted Parking Area and Special Parking Area) (County of Surrey) (Borough of Reigate and Banstead) Order 2004 (S.I. 2004 No. 1285)
- The Education (Inspectors of Schools in England) (No. 2) Order 2004 (S.I. 2004 No.1286)
- The Nuclear Safeguards (Jersey) Order 2004 (S.I. 2004 No. 1288)
- The Nuclear Safeguards (Isle of Man) Order 2004 (S.I. 2004 No. 1289)
- The Nuclear Safeguards (Guernsey) Order 2004 (S.I. 2004 No. 1290)
- The Court of Protection (Amendment) Rules 2004 (S.I. 2004 No. 1291)
- The Crown Court (Amendment No. 2) Rules 2004 (S.I. 2004 No. 1292 (L. 6)])
- The Criminal Appeal (Amendment) Rules 2004 (S.I. 2004 No. 1293 (L.7 )])
- The Beer from Small Breweries (Extension of Reduced Rates of Excise Duty) Order 2004 (S.I. 2004 No. 1296)
- The Non-Domestic Rating (Chargeable Amounts)(Amendment)(England) Regulations 2004 (S.I. 2004 No. 1297)
- The European Parliamentary Elections (Returning Officers' Charges) (Great Britain and Gibraltar) Order 2004 (S.I. 2004 No. 1298)
- The European Parliamentary Elections (Local Returning Officers' Charges) (Great Britain and Gibraltar) Order 2004 (S.I. 2004 No. 1299)
- The Measuring Instruments (EEC Requirements) (Fees) Regulations 2004 (S.I. 2004 No. 1300)

== 1301–1400 ==
- The Feeding Stuffs, the Feeding Stuffs (Sampling and Analysis) and the Feeding Stuffs (Enforcement) (Amendment) (England) Regulations 2004 (S.I. 2004 No. 1301)
- The Rail Vehicle Accessibility (South Eastern Trains Class 376) Exemption Order 2004 (S.I. 2004 No.1302)
- The Courts Boards Areas (Amendment) Order 2004 (S.I. 2004 No. 1303)
- The Immigration (Passenger Transit Visa) (Amendment) Order 2004 (S.I. 2004 No. 1304)
- The Road Traffic (Permitted Parking Area and Special Parking Area) (Metropolitan Borough of Wigan) Order 2004 (S.I. 2004 No. 1305)
- The Civil Procedure (Amendment) Rules 2004 (S.I. 2004 No. 1306 (L. 8)])
- Greenwich Park, Hyde Park and The Regent's Park (Vehicle Parking) (Amendment) Regulations 2004 (S.I. 2004 No. 1307)
- Royal Parks and Other Open Spaces (Amendment) Regulations 2004 (S.I. 2004 No. 1308)
- The Adventure Activities Licensing Regulations 2004 (S.I. 2004 No. 1309)
- The Valuation Tribunals (Wales) (Amendment) Regulations 2004 (S.I. 2004 No. 1312 (W.138))
- Rheoliadau Tribiwnlysoedd Prisio (Cymru) (Diwygio) 2004 (S.I. 2004 Rhif 1312 (Cy.138))
- The Asylum Support (Amendment) (No.2) Regulations 2004 (S.I. 2004 No. 1313)
- The Care Homes (Wales) (Amendment) Regulations 2004 (S.I. 2004 No. 1314 (W.139))
- Rheoliadau Cartrefi Gofal (Cymru) (Diwygio) 2004 (S.I. 2004 Rhif 1314 (Cy.139))
- The Burma (Sale, Supply, Export, Technical Assistance, Financing and Financial Assistance and Shipment of Equipment) (Penalties and Licences) Regulations 2004 (S.I. 2004 No. 1315)
- The Seed Potatoes (Fees) (England) Regulations 2004 (S.I. 2004 No. 1316)
- The Beef Carcase (Classification) (England) Regulations 2004 (S.I. 2004 No.1317)
- Education Act 2002 (Commencement No. 8) Order 2004 (S.I. 2004 No. 1318 (C. 53)])
- The Police Reform Act 2002 (Commencement No. 9) Order 2004 (S.I. 2004 No. 1319 (C. 54)])
- The Adventure Activities (Enforcing Authority) Regulations 2004 (S.I. 2004 No. 1359)
- The Income Tax (Professional Fees) Order 2004 (S.I. 2004 No. 1360)
- The Social Security (Crediting and Treatment of Contributions, and National Insurance Numbers) Amendment Regulations 2004 (S.I. 2004 No. 1361)
- The Social Security (Contributions) (Amendment No. 3) Regulations 2004 (S.I. 2004 No. 1362)
- The Stamp Duty Land Tax (Appeals) Regulations 2004 (S.I. 2004 No. 1363)
- The Fireworks (Safety) (Amendment) Regulations 2004 (S.I. 2004 No. 1372)
- The European Parliamentary Elections (Welsh Forms) Order 2004 (S.I. 2004 No. 1373)
- The European Parliamentary Elections (Common Electoral Principles) Regulations 2004 (S.I. 2004 No. 1374)
- The Landfill (England and Wales) (Amendment) Regulations 2004 (S.I. 2004 No. 1375)
- The Criminal Justice and Police Act 2001 (Commencement No. 10) Order 2004 (S.I. 2004 No. 1376 (C. 55 )])
- The Education (Individual Pupil Information) (Prescribed Persons) (England) (Amendment) Regulations 2004 (S.I. 2004 No. 1377)
- The Designation of Schools Having a Religious Character (Independent Schools) (England) (No.4) Order 2004 (S.I. 2004 No. 1378)
- The National Health Service Bodies and Local Authority Partnership Arrangements (Wales) (Amendment) Regulations 2004 (S.I. 2004 No. 1390 (W.140))
- Rheoliadau Trefniadau Partneriaeth Cyrff Gwasanaeth Iechyd Gwladol ac Awdurdodau Lleol (Cymru) (Diwygio) 2004 (S.I. 2004 Rhif 1390 (Cy.140))
- The Natural History Museum (Authorised Repositories) Order 2004 (S.I. 2004 No. 1392)
- The Pesticides (Maximum Residue Levels in Crops, Food and Feeding Stuffs) (England and Wales) (Amendment) (No. 2) Regulations 2004 (S.I. 2004 No. 1393)
- The Meat Products (Wales) Regulations 2004 (S.I. 2004 No. 1396 (W.141))
- Rheoliadau Cynhyrchion Cig (Cymru) 2004 (S.I. 2004 Rhif 1396 (Cy.141))
- The Horse Passports (England) Regulations 2004 (S.I. 2004 No. 1397)

== 1401–1500 ==
- The Road Traffic (Permitted Parking Area and Special Parking Area) (Metropolitan Borough of Rochdale) Order 2004 (S.I. 2004 No. 1402)
- The Adoption and Children Act 2002 (Commencement No. 6) Order 2004 (S.I. 2004 No. 1403 (C.56)])
- The Plant Health (Export Certification) (England) Order 2004 (S.I. 2004 No. 1404)
- The European Parliamentary Elections (Returning Officer's Charges) (Northern Ireland) Order 2004 (S.I. 2004 No. 1405)
- The Collection of Fines (Pilot Schemes) (Amendment) Order 2004 (S.I. 2004 No. 1406)
- The Fines Collection (Amendment) Regulations 2004 (S.I. 2004 No. 1407)
- The Prisoner Custody Officers (Searching of Prisoners) Rules (Northern Ireland) 2004 (S.I. 2004 No. 1408)
- The Offshore Installations (Safety Zones) (No. 2) Order 2004 (S.I. 2004 No. 1409)
- The Rail Vehicle Accessibility (Hull Trains Class 170/3) Exemption Order 2004 (S.I. 2004 No. 1410)
- The Isles of Scilly (Functions) (Review and Scrutiny of Health Services) Order 2004 (S.I. 2004 No. 1412)
- The Primary Care Trusts (Establishment) (Amendment No.2) Order 2004 (S.I. 2004 No. 1413)
- The Tax Credits (Provision of Information) (Evaluation and Statistical Studies) (Northern Ireland) Regulations 2004 (S.I. 2004 No. 1414)
- The European Parliamentary Election Petition (Amendment) Rules 2004 (S.I. 2004 No. 1415 (L. 9)])
- The Government Resources and Accounts Act 2000 (Summarised Accounts of Special Health Authorities) Order 2004 (S.I. 2004 No. 1416)
- The Dangerous Substances and Preparations (Safety) (Consolidation) (Amendment) Regulations 2004 (S.I. 2004 No. 1417)
- The Air Carrier Liability Regulations 2004 (S.I. 2004 No. 1418)
- The Review of Children's Cases (Amendment) (England) Regulations 2004 (S.I. 2004 No. 1419)
- The Health and Social Care Act 2001 (Isles of Scilly) Order 2004 (S.I. 2004 No. 1425)
- The Bridlington Harbour Revision (Constitution) Order 2004 (S.I. 2004 No. 1426)
- The Local Authority (Overview and Scrutiny Committees Health Scrutiny Functions) Amendment Regulations 2004 (S.I. 2004 No. 1427)
- The Disability Discrimination (Providers of Services) (Adjustment of Premises) (Amendment) Regulations 2004 (S.I. 2004 No. 1429)
- The Products of Animal Origin (Third Country Imports) (Wales) Regulations 2004 (S.I. 2004 No. 1430 (W.144))
- Rheoliadau Cynhyrchion sy'n Tarddu o Anifeiliaid (Mewnforion Trydydd Gwledydd) (Cymru) 2004 (S.I. 2004 Rhif 1430 (Cy.144))
- The Private Security Industry Act 2001 (Commencement No. 3) Order 2004 (S.I. 2004 No. 1431 (C. 57)])
- The Registration of Establishments (Laying Hens) (Wales) Regulations 2004 (S.I. 2004 No. 1432 (W.145))
- Rheoliadau Cofrestru Sefydliadau (Ieir Dodwy) (Cymru) 2004 (S.I. 2004 Rhif 1432 (Cy.145))
- The National Health Service (Charges to Overseas Visitors) (Amendment) (Wales) Regulations 2004 (S.I. 2004 No. 1433 (W.146))
- Rheoliadau'r Gwasanaeth Iechyd Gwladol (Ffioedd Ymwelwyr Tramor) (Diwygio) (Cymru) 2004 (S.I. 2004 Rhif 1433 (Cy.146))
- The Town and Country Planning (General Development Procedure) (Amendment) (Wales) Order 2004 (S.I. 2004 No. 1434 (W.147))
- Gorchymyn Cynllunio Gwlad a Thref (Gweithdrefn Datblygu Cyffredinol) (Diwygio) (Cymru) 2004 (S.I. 2004 Rhif 1434 (Cy.147))
- The Dartford-Thurrock Crossing (Amendment) Regulations 2004 (S.I. 2004 No. 1441)
- The Home-Grown Cereals Authority (Rate of Levy) Order 2004 (S.I. 2004 No. 1445)
- The Advocacy Services and Representations Procedure (Children) (Wales) Regulations 2004 (S.I. 2004 No. 1448 (W.148))
- Rheoliadau Gwasanaethau Eirioli a Gweithdrefn Sylwadau (Plant) (Cymru) 2004 (S.I. 2004 Rhif 1448 (Cy.148))
- The Review of Children's Cases (Amendment) (Wales) Regulations 2004 (S.I. 2004 No. 1449 (W.149))
- Rheoliadau Adolygu Achosion Plant (Diwygio) (Cymru) 2004 (S.I. 2004 Rhif 1449 (Cy.149))
- The Child Trust Funds Regulations 2004 (S.I. 2004 No. 1450)
- The Polish Potatoes (Notification) (England) Order 2004 (S.I. 2004 No. 1452)
- The Recreational Craft Regulations 2004 (S.I. 2004 No. 1464)
- The Building (Amendment) Regulations 2004 (S.I. 2004 No. 1465)
- The Building (Approved Inspectors etc.) (Amendment) Regulations 2004 (S.I. 2004 No.1466)
- The Energy Information (Household Refrigerators and Freezers) Regulations 2004 (S.I. 2004 No. 1468)
- The Merchant Shipping (Hours of Work) (Amendment) Regulations 2004 (S.I. 2004 No. 1469)
- The Goods Infringing Intellectual Property Rights (Customs) Regulations 2004 (S.I. 2004 No. 1473)
- The Medicines (Advertising) Amendment Regulations 2004 (S.I. 2004 No. 1480)
- The Consumer Credit (Disclosure of Information) Regulations 2004 (S.I. 2004 No. 1481)
- The Consumer Credit (Agreements) (Amendment) Regulations 2004 (S.I. 2004 No. 1482)
- The Consumer Credit (Early Settlement) Regulations 2004 (S.I. 2004 No. 1483)
- The Consumer Credit (Advertisements) Regulations 2004 (S.I. 2004 No.1484)
- The Immigration Employment Document (Fees) (Amendment) (No. 2) Regulations 2004 (S.I. 2004 No. 1485)
- The Government Stock (Consequential and Transitional Provision) Order 2004 (S.I. 2004 No. 1486)
- The Wildlife and Countryside Act 1981(England and Wales) (Amendment) Regulations 2004 (S.I. 2004 No. 1487)
- The Waste and Emissions Trading Act 2003 (Commencement) (Wales) Order 204 (S.I. 2004 No. 1488 (W.153)(C.58))
- Gorchymyn Deddf Gwastraff a Masnachu Allyriannau 2003 (Cychwyn) (Cymru) 2004 (S.I. 2004 Rhif 1488 (Cy.153) (C.58))
- The Countryside and Rights of Way Act 2000 (Commencement No. 5) (Wales) Order 2004 (S.I. 2004 No. 1489 (W.154) (C.59))
- Gorchymyn Deddf Cefn Gwlad a Hawliau Tramwy 2000 (Cychwyn Rhif 5) (Cymru) 2004 (S.I. 2004 Rhif 1489 (Cy.154) (C.59))
- The Landfill Allowances Scheme (Wales) Regulations 2004 (S.I. 2004 No. 1490 (W.155))
- Rheoliadau'r Cynllun Lwfansau Tirlenwi (Cymru) 2004 (S.I. 2004 Rhif 1490 (Cy.155))
- The Police Pensions (Amendment) Regulations 2004 (S.I. 2004 No. 1491)
- Office of Communications Act 2002 (Commencement No. 3) and Communications Act 2003 (Commencement No. 2) (Amendment No. 3) Order 2004 (S.I. 2004 No. 1492 (C. 60 )])
- The Education (Prohibition from Teaching or Working with Children) (Amendment) Regulations 2004 (S.I. 2004 No.1493)
- The Non-Domestic Rating (Miscellaneous Provisions) (Amendment) (England) Regulations 2004 (S.I. 2004 No. 1494)
- The Ship and Port Facility (Security) Regulations 2004 (S.I. 2004 No. 1495)
- The Army, Air Force and Naval Discipline Acts (Continuation) Order 2004 (S.I. 2004 No. 1496)
- The Trade Marks Act 1994 (Isle of Man) (Amendment) Order 2004 (S.I. 2004 No. 1497)
- The Iraq (United Nations Sanctions)(Amendment) Order 2004 (S.I. 2004 No. 1498)
- The European Communities (Definition of Treaties) (Agreement on Enlargement of the European Economic Area) Order 2004 (S.I. 2004 No. 1499)
- The Criminal Justice (Northern Ireland) Order 2004 (S.I. 2004 No. 1500 (N.I. 9)])

== 1501–1600 ==
- The Criminal Justice (Evidence) (Northern Ireland) Order 2004 (S.I. 2004 No. 1501 (N.I. 10)])
- Anti-social Behaviour Act 2003 (Commencement No. 3 and Savings) Order 2004 (S.I. 2004 No. 1502 (C.61)])
- The Police and Criminal Evidence Act 1984 (Remote Reviews of Detention) (Specified Police Stations) (Revocation) Regulations 2004 (S.I. 2004 No. 1503)
- The Veterinary Surgery (Artificial Insemination of Mares) Order 2004 (S.I. 2004 No. 1504)
- The Pig Carcase (Grading) (Amendment) (England) Regulations 2004 (S.I. 2004 No. 1505)
- The Shoreham Port Authority Harbour Revision (Constitution) Order 2004 (S.I. 2004 No. 1506)
- The Local Elections (Declaration of Acceptance of Office) (Wales) Order 2004 (S.I. 2004 No. 1508 (W.157))
- Gorchymyn Etholiadau Lleol (Datganiad Derbyn Swydd) (Cymru) 2004 (S.I. 2004 Rhif 1508 (Cy.157))
- The Natural Mineral Water, Spring Water and Bottled Drinking Water (Amendment) (Wales) Regulations 2004 (S.I. 2004 No. 1509 (W.158))
- Rheoliadau Dŵr Mwynol Naturiol, Dŵr Ffynnon a Dŵr Yfed wedi'i Botelu (Diwygio) (Cymru) 2004 (S.I. 2004 Rhif 1509 (Cy.158))
- The Conduct of Members (Model Code of Conduct) (Wales) (Amendment) (No. 2) Order 2004 (S.I. 2004 No. 1510 (W.159))
- Gorchymyn Ymddygiad Aelodau (Cod Ymddygiad Enghreifftiol) (Cymru) (Diwygio) (Rhif 2) 2004 (S.I. 2004 Rhif 1510 (Cy.159))
- The Human Fertilisation and Embryology Authority (Disclosure of Donor Information) Regulations 2004 (S.I. 2004 No. 1511)
- The Food Labelling (Amendment) (England) Regulations 2004 (S.I. 2004 No. 1512)
- The Designation of Schools having a Religious Character (England) (No 1) Order 2004 (S.I. 2004 No. 1513)
- The Justices of the Peace (Size and Chairmanship of Bench) (Amendment) Rules 2004 (S.I. 2004 No. 1514)
- Education (Co-ordination of Admission Arrangements) (Primary Schools) (England) (Amendment) Regulations 2004 (S.I. 2004 No. 1515)
- The Education (Co-ordination of Admission Arrangements) (Secondary Schools) (England) (Amendment) Regulations 2004 (S.I. 2004 No. 1516)
- The Enterprise Act 2002 (Bodies Designated to make Super-complaints) Order 2004 (S.I. 2004 No. 1517)
- The TSE (England) (Amendment) Regulations 2004 (S.I. 2004 No. 1518)
- The Motor Vehicles (Driving Licences) (Amendment) (No.2) Regulations 2004 (S.I. 2004 No. 1519)
- The Income Support (General) (Standard Interest Rate Amendment) (No. 2) Regulations 2004 (S.I. 2004 No.1520)
- The Chiropractors Act 1994 (Commencement No. 7) Order 2004 (S.I. 2004 No. 1521(C. 62 )])
- The British Transport Police (Police Services Agreement) Order 2004 (S.I. 2004 No. 1522)
- The Railways and Transport Safety Act 2003 (Commencement No. 3) Order 2004 (S.I. 2004 No. 1572 (C.63 )])
- The British Transport Police (Transitional and Consequential Provisions) Order 2004 (S.I. 2004 No. 1573)
- The Human Rights Act 1998 (Amendment) Order 2004 (S.I. 2004 No. 1574)
- The Local Government (Whole Authority Analyses and Improvement Plans) (Wales) (Amendment) Order 2004 (S.I. 2004 No. 1575 (W.161))
- Gorchymyn Llywodraeth Leol (Dadansoddiadau Awdurdodau Cyfan a Chynlluniau Gwella) (Cymru) (Diwygio) 2004 (S.I. 2004 Rhif 1575 (Cy.161))
- The School Organisation Proposals by the National Council for Education and Training for Wales Regulations 2004 (S.I. 2004 No. 1576 (W.162))
- Rheoliadau Cynigion ar Drefniadaeth Ysgolion gan Gyngor Cenedlaethol Cymru dros Addysg a Hyfforddiant 2004 (S.I. 2004 Rhif 1576 (Cy.162))
- The Daventry Tertiary College (Dissolution) Order 2004 (S.I. 2004 No.1598)

== 1601–1700 ==
- The Education (Student Support) (No. 2) Regulations 2002 (Amendment) (No. 2) Regulations 2004 (S.I. 2004 No. 1602)
- The Organic Products Regulations 2004 (S.I. 2004 No. 1604)
- The National Health Service (Charges for Drugs and Appliances) (Wales) (Amendment) Regulations 2004 (S.I. 2004 No. 1605 (W.164))
- Rheoliadau'r Gwasanaeth Iechyd Gwladol (Ffioedd am Gyffuriau a Chyfarpar) (Cymru) (Diwygio) 2004 (S.I. 2004 Rhif 1605 (Cy.164))
- The Farm Waste Grant (Nitrate Vulnerable Zones) (Wales) Scheme 2004 (S.I. 2004 No. 1606 (W.165))
- Cynllun Grantiau Gwastraff Fferm (Parthau Perygl Nitradau) (Cymru) 2004 (S.I. 2004 Rhif 1606 (Cy.165))
- The Dyfed Powys Health Authority and Gwent Health Authority (Transfer of Trust Property) Order 2004 (S.I. 2004 No. 1607 (W.166))
- Gorchymyn Awdurdod Iechyd Dyfed Powys ac Awdurdod Iechyd Gwent (Trosglwyddo Eiddo Ymddiriedolaeth) 2004 (S.I. 2004 Rhif 1607 (Cy.166))
- The Road Traffic (Permitted Parking Area and Special Parking Area) (County of Denbighshire) Order 2004 (S.I. 2004 No. 1608 (W.167))
- Gorchymyn Traffig Ffyrdd (Ardal Barcio a Ganiateir ac Ardal Barcio Arbennig) (Sir Ddinbych) 2004 (S.I. 2004 Rhif 1608 (Cy.167))
- The Financial Services and Markets Act 2000 (Transitional Provisions) (Complaints Relating to General Insurance and Mortgages) (Amendment) Order 2004 (S.I. 2004 No. 1609)
- The Financial Services and Markets Act 2000 (Regulated Activities) (Amendment) Order 2004 (S.I. 2004 No. 1610)
- The Government Stock Regulations 2004 (S.I. 2004 No. 1611)
- The Local Health Partnerships National Health Service Trust (Change of Name) (Establishment) Amendment Order 2004 (S.I. 2004 No. 1624)
- The Newham Healthcare National Health Service Trust (Change of Name) (Establishment) Amendment Order 2004 (S.I. 2004 No. 1625)
- The Norfolk Mental Health Care National Health Service Trust (Change of Name) (Establishment) Amendment Order 2004 (S.I. 2004 No. 1626)
- The Secure Tenancies (Notices) (Amendment) (England) Regulations 2004 (S.I. 2004 No. 1627)
- The European Communities (Lawyer's Practice) (Amendment) Regulations 2004 (S.I. 2004 No. 1628)
- The Criminal Justice Act 2003 (Commencement No. 4 and Saving Provisions) Order 2004 (S.I. 2004 No.1629(C. 64 )])
- The Bradford City Primary Care Trust (Change of Name) Order 2004 (S.I. 2004 No. 1630)
- The Home Loss Payments (Prescribed Amounts)(England) Regulations 2004 (S.I. 2004 No. 1631)
- The Motor Vehicles (Tests) (Amendment) Regulations 2004 (S.I. 2004 No. 1632)
- The Environmental Assessment of Plans and Programmes Regulations 2004 (S.I. 2004 No. 1633)
- The Freedom of Information (Removal of References to Public Authorities) Order 2004 (S.I. 2004 No. 1641)
- The London Thames Gateway Development Corporation (Area and Constitution) Order 2004 (S.I. 2004 No. 1642)
- The Greenwich Primary Care Trust (Change of Name) Order 2004 (S.I. 2004 No. 1643)
- The Transport for London (Arlington Street) Order 2004 (S.I. 2004 No. 1651)
- Broadcasting (Original Productions) Order 2004 (S.I. 2004 No. 1652)
- The Nursing and Midwifery Council (Fees) Rules Order of Council 2004 (S.I. 2004 No. 1654)
- The Back to Work Bonus (Amendment) Regulations 2004 (S.I. 2004 No. 1655)
- The Environmental Assessment of Plans and Programmes (Wales) Regulations 2004 (S.I. 2004 No. 1656 (W.170))
- Rheoliadau Asesiadau Amgylcheddol o Gynlluniau a Rhaglenni (Cymru) 2004 (S.I. 2004 Rhif 1656 (Cy.170))
- The Amalgamation of the West of Ouse, Gaywood, Magdalen, Marshland Smeeth and Fen, and Wingland Internal Drainage Districts Order 2004 (S.I. 2004 No. 1657)
- The Education (Grants For Disabled Postgraduate Students) (Amendment) Regulations 2004 (S.I. 2004 No. 1658)
- The National Health Service (Optical Charges and Payments) (Amendment) (Wales) Regulations 2004 (S.I. 2004 No. 1659 (W.171))
- Rheoliadau'r Gwasanaeth Iechyd Gwladol (Ffioedd a Thaliadau Optegol) (Diwygio) (Cymru) 2004 (S.I. 2004 Rhif 1659 (Cy.171))
- The Iraq (United Nations Sanctions) Order 2000 (Amendment) Regulations 2004 (S.I. 2004 No. 1660)
- The Passenger Car (Fuel Consumption and CO_{2} Emissions Information) (Amendment) Regulations 2004 (S.I. 2004 No. 1661)
- The Government Stock (Consequential and Transitional Provision) (No. 2) Order 2004 (S.I. 2004 No. 1662)
- The Value Added Tax (Amendment) (No. 3) Regulations 2004 (S.I. 2004 No. 1675)
- The Personal Equity Plan (Amendment) Regulations 2004 (S.I. 2004 No. 1676)
- The Individual Savings Account (Amendment) Regulations 2004 (S.I. 2004 No. 1677)
- The Medicines (Standard Provisions for Licences and Certificates) Amendment Regulations 2004 (S.I. 2004 No. 1678)
- The Demoted Tenancies (Review of Decisions)(England) Regulations 2004 (S.I. 2004 No. 1679)
- The Veterinary Surgeons and Veterinary Practitioners (Disciplinary Committee) (Procedure and Evidence) Rules Order of Council 2004 (S.I. 2004 No. 1680)
- The Rother Valley College (Dissolution) Order 2004 (S.I. 2004 No. 1681)
- The Redundancy Payments (Continuity of Employment in Local Government, etc.) (Modification) (Amendment) Order 2004 (S.I. 2004 No. 1682)
- The Criminal Justice Act 2003 (Conditional Cautions: Code of Practice) Order 2004 (S.I. 2004 No. 1683)
- The Plant Health (Export Certification) (Forestry) (Great Britain) Order 2004 (S.I. 2004 No. 1684)
- The Charges for Inspections and Controls (Amendment) Regulations 2004 (S.I. 2004 No. 1697)

== See also ==
- List of statutory instruments of the United Kingdom
